= 2025 Rugby League Pacific Championships squads =

Rugby League teams for 2025 tournament

This article lists the official squads for the 2025 Rugby League Pacific Championships which are to be played from 18 October to 9 November 2025.

For an explanation of the acronyms and abbreviations are used in the tables, please see the key to acronyms section at the end of this article.

== Pacific Cup men ==
=== New Zealand ===
The New Zealand Kiwis squad was announced on 7 October 2025. The 21 players selected were all named in the team for the first match.

Jersey numbers in the table reflect team selection for the Final versus Toa Samoa

Statistics in this table are compiled from the website, Rugby League Project.

J#	Player	Age	Position(s)	Tournament					Kiwis Career						Club Competitions		Other Representative Matches
J#	Player	Age	Position(s)	Tournament					Kiwis Career						2025 Club	Mat	Other Representative Matches
J#	Player	Age	Position(s)	M	T	G	F	P	Dbt	M	T	G	F	P	2025 Club	T1	Other Representative Matches
1	Keano Kini	21	Fullback	2	1	0	0	4	2024	5	2	0	0	8	Titans	28	1
2	Jamayne Isaako	29	Wing, Fullback	3	0	16	0	32	2018	14	9	52	1	141	Dolphins	160	1
3	Matthew Timoko	25	Centre	3	2	0	0	8	2023	9	3	0	0	12	Raiders	111	1
4	Charnze Nicoll-Klokstad	30	Centre, Fullback	3	2	0	0	8	2019	17	7	0	0	28	Warriors	136	2
5	Casey McLean	19	Wing, Centre	3	4	0	0	16	2024	4	8	0	0	32	Panthers	30
6	Dylan Brown	25	Five-eighth	3	3	0	0	12	2022	11	5	2	0	24	Eels	142
7	Kieran Foran	35	Halfback, Five-eighth	3	0	0	0	0	2009	35	1	6	0	16	Titans	318	2
8	James Fisher-Harris	29	Prop	3	0	0	0	0	2016	21	2	0	0	8	Warriors	222	5
9	Phoenix Crossland	25	Hooker, Halfback	3	1	0	0	4	2024	6	2	0	0	8	Knights	107
10	Moses Leota	30	Prop	3	0	0	0	0	2022	9	0	0	0	0	Panthers	201
11	Briton Nikora	27	Second-row	3	0	0	0	0	2019	17	5	0	0	20	Sharks	159	5
12	Isaiah Papali'i	27	Second-row	3	2	0	0	8	2018	16	5	1	0	22	Panthers	178	1
13	Joseph Tapine	31	Lock, Prop	3	0	0	0	0	2016	26	3	0	0	12	Raiders	236	5
14	Te Maire Martin	30	Hooker, Five-eighth	2	0	0	0	0	2016	6	3	0	0	12	Warriors	110	1
15	Naufahu Whyte	23	Lock, Prop	3	1	0	0	4	2024	6	2	0	0	8	Roosters	57
16	Erin Clark	28	Hooker	3	1	0	0	4	2024	4	1	0	0	4	Warriors	120	2 1
17	Xavier Willison	23	Prop, Second-row	2	0	0	0	0	2025	2	0	0	0	0	Broncos	51	1 2
18	Scott Sorensen	32	Second-row	0	0	0	0	0	2022	4	0	0	0	0	Panthers	139
19	Zach Dockar-Clay	30	Hooker, Halfback	0	0	0	0	0	—	0	0	0	0	0	Roosters	36	2
20	Josiah Karapani	23	Wing, Centre	0	0	0	0	0	—	0	0	0	0	0	Broncos	23
IJ	Nelson Asofa-Solomona	29	Prop	1	0	0	0	0	2017	17	3	0	0	12	Storm	215
IJ	Sebastian Kris	26	Wing, Centre	0	0	0	0	0	2022	2	4	0	0	16	Raiders	109
IJ	Ronaldo Mulitalo	25	Wing	1	0	0	0	0	2022	10	9	0	0	36	Sharks	136
IJ	Jeremy Marshall-King	29	Hooker	1	0	0	0	0	2022	4	3	0	0	12	Dolphins	151	2

- Te Maire Martin and Zach Dockar-Clay were added to the squad ahead of the Round 3 match against Tonga to replace the injured Ronaldo Mulitalo (knee) and Jeremy Marshall-King (thumb).
- Josiah Karapani was added to the squad ahead of the Final to replace the injured Nelson Asofa-Solomona and Sebastian Kris.
- Five members of the squad had previously played for other nations:
  - Samoa (3): Clark, Isaako, and Papali'i and Mulitalo.
  - Cook Islands (3): Nicoll-Klokstad, Niukore, and Willison.
- Ten squad members have played in All Stars matches.
  - Māori All Stars (10).
  - NRL All Stars team (1): Kieran Foran
- Naufahu Whyte was an unused 18th player replacement in all three New Zealand matches in the 2023 tournament.
- Casey McLean played for New South Wales Under 19s in June 2024.

=== Samoa ===
The Toa Samoa squad was announced on 7 October 2025.

Jersey numbers in the table reflect team selection for the Final versus New Zealand Kiwis

Statistics in this table are compiled from the website, Rugby League Project.

J#	Player	Age	Position(s)	Tournament					Toa Samoa Career						Club Competitions		Other Representative Matches
J#	Player	Age	Position(s)	Tournament					Toa Samoa Career						2025 Club	Mat	Other Representative Matches
J#	Player	Age	Position(s)	M	T	G	F	P	Dbt	M	T	G	F	P	2025 Club	T1	Other Representative Matches
1	Roger Tuivasa-Sheck	32	Fullback	3	0	0	0	0	2024	5	0	0	0	0	Warriors	232	20
2	Brian To'o	27	Wing	3	1	0	0	4	2019	11	6	0	0	24	Panthers	133	15
3	Izack Tago	23	Centre	3	1	0	0	4	2022	7	3	0	0	12	Panthers	99
4	Deine Mariner	22	Centre, Wing	3	1	0	0	4	2024	5	3	0	0	12	Broncos	46
5	Murray Taulagi	26	Wing	3	2	0	0	8	2023	5	3	0	0	12	Cowboys	108	2 6 1
6	Blaize Talagi	20	Five-eighth, Centre	3	0	11	0	22	2024	5	0	11	0	22	Eels	42
7	Jarome Luai	28	Halfback, Five-eighth	3	0	0	0	0	2017	16	3	0	0	12	Wests Tigers	152	12 1
8	Francis Molo	31	Prop	3	0	0	0	0	2022	6	0	0	0	0	Dolphins	154	2 2
15	Benaiah Ioelu	21	Hooker	3	0	0	0	0	2025	3	0	0	0	0	Roosters	12
10	Payne Haas	25	Prop	3	1	0	0	4	2025	3	1	0	0	4	Broncos	142	4 17 1
11	Jaydn Su'a	28	Second-row	2	0	0	0	0	2019	10	1	0	0	4	Dragons	154	6
12	Simi Sasagi	24	Second-row, Centre	3	2	0	0	8	2025	4	2	0	0	8	Raiders	49
13	Junior Paulo	31	Lock, Prop	3	0	0	0	0	2016	20	3	0	0	12	Eels	263	11
14	Chanel Harris-Tavita	26	Five-eighth, Halfback	3	1	0	0	4	2019	10	5	0	0	20	Warriors	95	1
9	Jazz Tevaga	30	Hooker, Lock	3	0	0	0	0	2017	10	1	0	0	4	Sea Eagles	162	3
16	Terrell May	26	Prop	2	0	0	0	0	2023	6	0	0	0	0	Wests Tigers	77
17	Josh Papali'i	33	Prop, Second-row	3	0	0	0	0	2017	13	0	0	0	0	Raiders	329	2 24 3
18	Ata Mariota	23	Prop, Second-row	1	0	0	0	0	2025	1	0	0	0	0	Raiders	67
19	Ativalu Lisati	24	Second-row, Lock	0	0	0	0	0	—	0	0	0	0	0	Storm	15
20	Clayton Faulalo	25	Wing, Centre	0	0	0	0	0	—	0	0	0	0	0	Sea Eagles	12
21	Lyhkan King-Togia	20	Five-eighth, Halfback	0	0	0	0	0	—	0	0	0	0	0	Dragons	21
IJ	Jeremiah Nanai	22	Second-row	2	2	0	0	8	2024	4	3	0	0	12	Cowboys	84	2 11
–	Taylan May	24	Wing, Centre	0	0	0	0	0	2022	5	6	0	0	24	Wests Tigers	37

Notes:

- In the Round 1 match against New Zealand, 18th player Ben Ioelu was activated and used after Jazz Tevaga (24'), Ata Mariota (56') were concussed and their head injury assessment was deemed no return.
  - Ata Mariota had been on the field for about a minute when he incurred a concussion attempting a tackle, his head contacting his opponent's thigh. Play was suspended for several minutes whilst he was treated.
- Clayton Faulalo was added to the squad and named in the team for Samoa's first round match, after initially being omitted.
- Initial selection Taylan May was not named for Samoa's first round match.
- Ativalu Lisati was added to the squad ahead of the Round 2 match.
- Five members of the squad have previously played for other international teams:
  - Cook Islands (1): Molo.
  - New Zealand (1): Tuivasa-Sheck
  - Australia (4): Haas, Nanai, Papali'i, and Taulagi. Haas, Papali'i, and Taulagi hae also played for the Prime Minister's XIII.
- Nine members of the squad have played State of Origin.
  - NSW (4): Haas, Luai, Paulo, and To'o.
  - Queensland (5): Molo, Nanai, Papali'i, Su'a, and Taulagi.
- Three squad members have played in All Stars matches.
  - Māori All Stars (3): Harris-Tavita, Luai, and Tevaga.

=== Tonga ===
The Tonga Mate Ma'a squad was announced on 7 October 2025.

Jersey numbers in the table reflect the Round 3 match versus New Zealand

Statistics in this table are compiled from the website, Rugby League Project.

J#	Player	Age	Position(s)	Tournament					Tonga Mate Ma'a Career						Club Competitions		Other Representative Matches
J#	Player	Age	Position(s)	Tournament					Tonga Mate Ma'a Career						2025 Club	Mat	Other Representative Matches
J#	Player	Age	Position(s)	M	T	G	F	P	Dbt	M	T	G	F	P	2025 Club	T1	Other Representative Matches
1	Lehi Hopoate	20	Fullback, Wing	2	0	0	0	0	2024	5	0	0	0	0	Sea Eagles	36
2	Daniel Tupou	34	Wing	2	1	0	0	4	2013	21	13	0	0	52	Roosters	289	1 2 10 1 2
19	Will Penisini	23	Centre	1	0	0	0	0	2022	8	5	0	0	20	Eels	100
4	Paul Alamoti	21	Centre	1	0	0	0	0	2024	4	0	0	0	0	Panthers	54
5	Sione Katoa	28	Wing	2	0	0	0	0	2022	10	4	0	0	16	Sharks	128
6	Isaiah Iongi	22	Five-eighth, Fullback	2	0	0	0	0	2025	2	0	0	0	0	Eels	22
7	Isaiya Katoa	21	Halfback	2	0	4	0	8	2022	11	2	33	1	75	Dolphins	68
8	Addin Fonua-Blake	29	Prop	2	0	0	0	0	2017	16	1	0	0	4	Sharks	209	1
9	Siliva Havili	32	Hooker	2	0	0	0	0	2013	21	3	0	0	12	Rabbitohs	173	1 2
16	Moeaki Fotuaika	25	Prop	2	0	0	0	0	2022	10	1	0	0	4	Titans	163	11
11	Eliesa Katoa	25	Second-row	2	0	0	0	0	2023	7	2	0	0	8	Storm	118
15	Kulikefu Finefeuiaki	21	Second-row	1	0	0	0	0	2025	1	0	0	0	0	Dolphins	57
13	Jason Taumalolo	32	Lock	1	0	0	0	0	2013	18	4	0	0	16	Cowboys	285	10 2 1
14	Soni Luke	29	Hooker	2	0	0	0	0	2022	10	1	0	0	4	Panthers	26
10	Felise Kaufusi	33	Second-row, Lock	2	0	0	0	0	2015	15	1	0	0	4	Dolphins	223	1 17
12	Siua Wong	22	Second-row	2	0	0	0	0	2023	5	0	0	0	0	Roosters	40	4
17	Demitric Vaimauga	21	Second-row	2	1	0	0	4	2025	2	1	0	0	4	Warriors	31
18	Leka Halasima	20	Second-row	1	0	0	0	0	2025	1	0	0	0	0	Warriors	29
3	Toluta'u Koula	23	Centre	1	1	0	0	4	2022	8	3	0	0	12	Sea Eagles	82
IJ	Robert Toia	21	Centre	1	0	0	0	0	2025	1	0	0	0	0	Roosters	22	3
C	Stefano Utoikamanu	25	Prop	1	0	0	0	0	2025	1	0	0	0	0	Storm	103	3

- Six members of the squad have previously played for other international teams:
  - Fiji (1): Wong.
  - New Zealand (4): Fonua-Blake, Havili, Taumalolo. Taumalolo also played one match for the NRL All Stars
  - Australia (2): Kaufusi and Tupou in 2014. Tupou has played for the Prime Minister's XIII.
- Four members of the squad have played State of Origin.
  - NSW (2): Utoikamanu and Tupou. Tupou also played for NSW City.
  - Queensland (3): Fotuaika, Kaufusi, and Toia.

== Pacific Bowl men ==
=== Cook Islands ===
The Cook Islands Aitu squad was announced on social media on 7 October 2025.

Jersey numbers in the table reflect selections for the Round 2 match versus the PNG Kumuls

J#	Player	Age	Position(s)	Tournament					Cook Islands Career						Club Competitions			Other Representative Matches
J#	Player	Age	Position(s)	Tournament					Cook Islands Career						2025 Club	Matches		Other Representative Matches
J#	Player	Age	Position(s)	M	T	G	F	P	Dbt	M	T	G	F	P	2025 Club	T1	T2	Other Representative Matches
5	Esom Ioka	22	Fullback, Wing	2	1	8	0	20	2023	6	4	9	0	34	Pride	0	52
2	Paul Ulberg	29	Wing	2	0	0	0	0	2019	7	4	0	0	16	Toulouse	0	159
3	Kayal Iro	25	Centre	2	1	0	0	4	2019	10	2	0	0	8	Sharks	38	0
4	Reubenn Rennie	30	Centre	2	2	0	0	8	2016	11	5	0	0	20	Toulouse	0	165
6	Caelys-Paul Putoko	—	Wing, Five-eighth	2	1	0	0	4	2025	2	1	0	0	4	Warriors	0	1
7	Cassius Cowley	—	Five-eighth, Halfback	2	0	0	0	0	2025	2	0	0	0	0	Seagulls	0	2
1	Esan Marsters	29	Halfback, Fullback	2	0	0	0	0	2015	12	2	0	0	8	Red Devils	145	37	6 4
8	Makahesi Makatoa	32	Prop	2	0	0	0	0	2015	11	1	0	0	4	Roosters	61	164
14	Rua Ngatikaura	25	Hooker	2	1	0	0	4	2022	8	2	0	0	8	Rabbitohs	0	48
13	Pride Petterson-Robati	30	Prop, Lock	2	1	0	0	4	2019	9	1	0	0	4	Magpies	0	97
11	Brendan Piakura	23	Second-row	2	0	0	0	0	2022	5	0	0	0	0	Broncos	54	29
12	Reuben Porter	28	Second-row	2	0	0	0	0	2017	10	0	0	0	0	Magpies	8	126	1
9	Mason Teague	22	Lock, Hooker	2	0	0	0	0	2024	4	0	0	0	0	Knights	8	57
18	Delahia Wigmore	—	Centre, Lock	1	1	0	0	4	2024	3	1	0	0	4	Panthers	0	1
20	Justin Makirere	—	Prop	2	1	0	0	4	2023	5	1	0	0	4	Devils	0	21
16	Brody Tamarua	26	Second-row	2	0	0	0	0	2019	3	0	0	0	0	Devils	0	14
17	Rhys Dakin	24	Prop	2	0	0	0	0	2023	5	0	0	0	0	Roosters	0	61
19	Teapo Stoltman	—	Centre	0	0	0	0	0	—	0	0	0	0	0	Magpies	0	0
10	Tepai Moeroa	30	Prop	1	0	0	0	0	2019	7	0	0	0	0	Red Devils	134	32	1 1
–	Davvy Moale	22	Prop	0	0	0	0	0	2022	8	3	0	0	12	Rabbitohs	70	14
–	Brad Takairangi	36	Five-eighth, Centre	0	0	0	0	0	2009	14	1	3	0	10	SW Goannas	202	3	4 2
–	Marata Niukore	29	Second-row	0	0	0	0	0	2017	3	2	0	0	8	Warriors	157	41

Notes:

- KL Iro was named captain for the Round 1 match after 2024 captain Brad Takairangi withdrew due to an injury.
- Takairangi was replaced in the Round 1 team by Caelys-Paul Putoko, who had been added to the squad.
- Rhys Dakin was added to the squad and named in the team for Cook Islands' first round match, after initially being omitted.
- Initial selections Davvy Moale and Marata Niukore were not named for Cook Islands' first round match.
- The shading in the Clubs column of the above table indicates players selected from teams outside the 2025 NRL season
  - First Tier
    - Salford Red Devils (Super League) (1): Marsters
  - Second Tier
    - Northern Pride (Qld Cup) (1): Ioka
    - Norths Devils (Qld Cup) (2): Makirere and Tamarua
    - Souths Logan Magpies (Qld Cup) (1): Porter
    - Toulouse Olympique (RFL Championship) (2): Rennie and Ulberg
    - Western Suburbs Magpies (NSW Cup) (1): Porter
    - New Zealand Warriors (NSW Cup) (1): Caelys-Paul Putoko
    - Wynnum Manly Seagulls (Qld Cup) (1): Cowley
  - Third Tier
    - South West Goannas (Macarthur RL) (1): Takairangi
    - Western Suburbs Red Devils (Illawarra RL) (1): Moeroa
    - Souths Logan Magpies (Brisbane A Grade)) (1): Stoltman
- Two members of the squad have previously played for another national team.
  - New Zealand (3): Marsters and Takairangi
- Four squad members have played for other representative teams:
  - Māori All Stars (3): Marsters, Porter, and Takairangi
  - NRL All Stars team (1): Moeroa
  - Prime Minister's XIII (1): Moeroa

=== Fiji ===
The Fiji Bati squad of 25 players was announced on 3 October 2025. On 9 October, a revised squad of 20 players was announced.

Jersey numbers in the table reflect team selection for the Round 3 match versus PNG Kumuls

Statistics in this table are compiled from the website, Rugby League Project.

J#	Player	Age	Position(s)	Tournament					Fiji Bati Career						Club Competitions			Other Representative Matches
J#	Player	Age	Position(s)	Tournament					Fiji Bati Career						2025 Club	Matches		Other Representative Matches
J#	Player	Age	Position(s)	M	T	G	F	P	Dbt	M	T	G	F	P	2025 Club	T1	T2	Other Representative Matches
1	Jahream Bula	23	Fullback	2	4	0	0	16	2023	5	5	0	0	20	Wests Tigers	57	3
2	Sunia Turuva	23	Wing, Fullback	2	0	0	0	0	2022	10	5	0	0	20	Wests Tigers	76	33
3	Jope Rauqe	—	Centre	1	0	0	0	0	2025	1	0	0	0	0	Bulldogs	0	0
4	Semi Valemei	26	Centre, Wing	2	1	0	0	4	2022	10	5	0	0	20	Cowboys	46	35
5	Ronald Philitoga	24	Wing	1	0	0	0	0	2025	1	0	0	0	0	Seagulls	0	27
6	Kurt Donoghoe	23	Five-eighth, Lock	2	1	0	0	4	2023	7	3	0	0	12	Dolphins	40	24
7	Brandon Wakeham	26	Halfback	2	0	7	0	14	2019	13	1	50	1	105	Sea Eagles	40	75
8	Tui Kamikamica	31	Prop	2	0	0	0	0	2016	24	3	0	0	12	Storm	138	72
9	Penioni Tagituimua	26	Hooker	2	0	0	0	0	2019	16	2	0	0	8	Bulldogs	0	10	1
17	Kylan Mafoa	—	Prop	2	0	0	0	0	2024	3	0	0	0	0	Sea Eagles	0	7
11	Taane Milne	30	Second-row, Centre	2	0	0	0	0	2017	17	4	16	0	48	Giants	109	73
12	Kitione Kautoga	23	Second-row	2	3	0	0	12	2023	6	4	0	0	16	Eels	18	40
13	Caleb Navale	22	Lock, Second-row	2	1	0	0	4	2023	7	2	0	0	8	Sea Eagles	9	29
14	Terrell Kalokalo	22	Fullback, Wing	2	0	0	0	0	2025	2	0	0	0	0	Rabbitohs	0	10
15	Solomone Saukuru	20	Centre	2	2	0	0	8	2025	2	2	0	0	8	Wests Tigers	0	0
16	Ben Nakubuwai	29	Prop, Second-row	1	0	0	0	0	2016	17	5	0	0	20	Devils	62	80
19	Keresi Maya	—	Lock	2	0	0	0	0	2025	2	0	0	0	0	Albatross	0	0
19	Akuila Qoro	—	Second-row	0	0	0	0	0	—	0	0	0	0	0	Bulldogs	0	0
10	Michael Waqa	20	Prop	1	0	0	0	0	2025	1	0	0	0	0	Broncos	0	7
20	Gabriel Tunimakubu	—	Prop	0	0	0	0	0	—	0	0	0	0	0	Silktails	0	0
–	Michael Jennings	37	Centre	1	0	0	0	0	2024	3	3	0	0	12	St Marys Saints	307	6	7 10 18
IJ	Jethro Rinakama	19	Wing	1	0	0	0	0	2025	1	0	0	0	0	Bulldogs	6	14

Notes:

- Mark Nawaqanitawase was bracketed with Ronald Philitoga to mitigate for the possibiliy, which transpired, that he was selected for the 2025 Kangaroo tour of England.
- The squad revision saw the addition of Michael Jennings and Penioni Tagituimua.
- The seven players to drop out of the squad were current NRL players Samuela Fainu and Sione Fainu (both Wests Tigers), Waqa Blake (Bradford Bulls) and state cup players Josese Lanyon (Wests Tigers, 1 NSW Cup match, mostly a Jersey Flegg player in 2025), Newtown Jets pair Jordin Leiu and Meli Nasau, and Joseph Litdamu (Western Clydesdales)
- Gabriel Tunimakubu, captain of the Kaiviti Silktails in the 2025 Jersey Flegg Cup for Under 21 players, was called into the squad to replace the injured Ben Nakubuwai.
- Several players were selected from under 21 feeder teams of NRL clubs:
  - Solomone Saukuru (Wests Tigers, NSW Jersey Flegg Cup)
  - Akuila Qoro (Kaiviti Silktails, NSW Jersey Flegg Cup)
  - Jope Rauqe (Canterbury Bulldogs, NSW Jersey Flegg Cup)
  - Michael Waqa (Brisbane Broncos, NRLQ Series)
- Two players were selected from Queensland Cup teams:
  - Norths Devils: Ben Nakubuwai
  - Wynnum Manly Seagulls: Ronald Philitoga
- One player was selected from Fiji based club:
  - Navy Albatross: Keresi Maya
- One player was selected from the third tier Ron Massey Cup:
  - St Marys Saints: Michael Jennings. In addition to previously playing for Australia (7), Tonga (10) and New South Wales (18),Jennings had represented the NRL All Stars (3), Prime Minister's XIII (4), and NSW City (4).
- Penioni Tagituimua was the only member of the squad to play for the Fiji Prime Minister's XIII in 2019.

=== Papua New Guinea ===
The PNG Kumuls squad was announced with the Round 2 teams.

Jersey numbers in the table reflect team selection for the Round 3 match versus Fiji Bati.

J#	Player	Age	Position(s)	Tournament					PNG Kumuls Career						Club Competitions			Other Representative Matches
J#	Player	Age	Position(s)	Tournament					PNG Kumuls Career						2025 Club	Matches		Other Representative Matches
J#	Player	Age	Position(s)	M	T	G	F	P	Dbt	M	T	G	F	P	2025 Club	T1	T2	Other Representative Matches
1	Morea Morea	24	Fullback	2	2	0	0	8	2024	3	3	0	0	12	Capras	0	32	2
2	Dudley Dotoi	22	Wing	1	1	0	0	4	2025	1	1	0	0	4	Blackhawks	0	36	1
3	Zac Laybutt	23	Centre	2	1	1	0	6	2023	5	3	6	0	24	Cowboys	22	31	1
4	Nene Macdonald	31	Centre, Fullback	2	1	0	0	4	2013	22	15	0	0	60	Red Devils	149	45	2 3
5	Alex Johnston	30	Wing	2	1	0	0	4	2019	12	4	0	0	16	Rabbitohs	243	0	4 1
6	Gairo Voro	—	Five-eighth	2	1	0	0	4	2025	2	1	0	0	4	Hunters	0	20
14	Finley Glare	—	Halfback, Five-eighth	2	0	0	0	0	2025	2	0	0	0	0	Hunters	0	36	1
8	Epel Kapinias	27	Prop	2	0	0	0	0	2022	6	3	0	0	12	Hunters	0	74	2
9	Edwin Ipape	26	Hooker	2	1	0	0	4	2019	11	3	0	0	12	Leopards	69	33
10	Valentine Richard	—	Prop	1	0	0	0	0	2023	7	1	0	0	4	Capras	0	49	1
11	Rhyse Martin	32	Second-row	2	2	14	0	36	2014	21	7	72	0	172	Rhinos	162	83	2
12	Nixon Putt	30	Second-row	2	1	0	0	4	2017	15	5	0	0	20	Capras	7	148	3
13	Jack de Belin	34	Lock, Prop	2	0	0	0	0	2023	8	0	0	0	0	Dragons	252	1	3 2
7	Lachlan Lam	27	Halfback	2	0	0	0	0	2017	15	7	0	0	28	Leopards	115	42	1
15	Robert Mathias	—	Centre	1	1	0	0	4	2024	4	1	0	0	4	Hunters	0	31	1
16	Cooper Bai	18	Lock	2	1	0	0	4	2025	2	1				Titans	1	7
17	Sylvester Namo	25	Second-row	2	0	0	0	0	2022	9	3	0	0	12	Tigers	20	48	2
18	Liam Horne	27	Lock, Hooker	1	0	0	0	0	2022	7	0	0	0	0	Tigers	48	51	1
19	Robert Derby	23	Wing	1	2	0	0	8	2022	8	8	0	0	32	Cowboys	18	42	1
20	Jacob Alick	25	Prop, Second-row	1	0	0	0	0	2022	11	0	0	0	0	Seagulls	19	81	1

Notes:

- The PNGRFL announced their Prime Minister's XIII squad on social media on 7 October, ahead of the match on 12 October 2025. The squad was also posted on the NRL website.
- The Prime Minister's XIII squad had excluded the incumbent joint-captains Lachlan Lam and Rhyse Martin who had Super League commitments.
  - Lam had finished his playing commitments with Leigh Leopards on 3 October.
  - Martin played for the winning team, Hull Kingston Rovers, in the 2025 Super League Grand Final on 11 October 2025.

== Pacific Cup women ==
=== Australia ===
The Australian Jillaroos squad was announced on 6 October 2025. A revised squad, with two changes, was announced on 10 October 2025.

Jersey numbers in the table reflect selections for the Pacific Cup Final versus New Zealand Kiwi Ferns

J#	Player	Age	Position(s)	Tournament					Jillaroos Career						Club Competitions			Other Representative Matches
J#	Player	Age	Position(s)	Tournament					Jillaroos Career						2025 Club	Matches		Other Representative Matches
J#	Player	Age	Position(s)	M	T	G	F	P	Dbt	M	T	G	F	P	2025 Club	T1	T2	Other Representative Matches
1	Tamika Upton	28	Fullback	2	3	0	0	12	2023	8	14	0	0	56	Broncos	50	20	10 2
2	Julia Robinson	27	Wing, Centre	3	4	0	0	16	2018	13	22	0	0	88	Broncos	46	17	10
3	Isabelle Kelly	29	Centre	3	0	0	0	0	2017	20	19	0	0	76	Roosters	55	26	16 1 3
4	Tiana Penitani Gray	29	Centre	3	0	0	0	0	2019	8	4	0	0	16	Sharks	48	29	1 11 4
5	Jakiya Whitfeld	24	Wing, Centre	2	1	0	0	4	2023	7	7	0	0	28	Cowboys	29	12	1
6	Ali Brigginshaw	35	Five-eighth, Lock	3	0	0	0	0	2009	29	7	23	0	74	Broncos	56	23	20 6 1
7	Jesse Southwell	20	Halfback	3	0	15	0	30	2025	3	0	15	0	30	Knights	40	12	5 1
8	Ellie Johnston	25	Prop, Second-row	3	1	0	0	4	2025	3	1	0	0	4	Sharks	48	28	3 5
9	Olivia Higgins	33	Hooker	1	0	0	0	0	2024	5	0	0	0	0	Knights	47	31	3 2
10	Jessika Elliston	28	Prop, Second-row	3	0	0	0	0	2023	5	0	0	0	0	Titans	48	16	10 1
11	Kezie Apps	34	Second-row, Prop	3	1	0	0	4	2014	22	3	0	0	12	Tigers	40	19	17 2 7 2
12	Yasmin Clydsdale	31	Second-row	3	1	0	0	4	2022	13	1	0	0	4	Knights	52	20	11
13	Olivia Kernick	24	Lock, Second-row	3	2	0	0	8	2022	10	4	0	0	16	Roosters	47	25	9 3 2 2
14	Quincy Dodd	25	Hooker	3	1	0	0	4	2024	5	1	0	0	4	Sharks	45	36	5 7 7 4
15	Keilee Joseph	23	Lock, Second-row	3	1	0	0	4	2022	9	2	0	0	8	Broncos	45	26	6 5
16	Jessica Sergis	28	Centre, Wing	3	4	0	0	16	2019	14	17	0	0	68	Roosters	46	17	13 3 1
17	Rima Butler	27	Prop	3	0	0	0	0	2025	3	0	0	0	0	Roosters	33	27	2 2
18	Sarah Togatuki	28	Prop, Lock	1	0	0	0	0	2024	5	0	0	0	0	Tigers	46	30	1 11 4 1
19	Abbi Church	27	Fullback, Centre	1	1	0	0	4	2025	1	1	0	0	4	Eels	37	25	3 1 3
20	Jocelyn Kelleher	25	Halfback, Five-eighth	0	0	0	0	0	—	0	0	0	0	0	Roosters	51	36	3 3
IJ	Keeley Davis	25	Hooker	2	0	0	0	0	2018	9	1	0	0	4	Roosters	56	28	10 5 1
IJ	Makenzie Weale	23	Lock, Prop	0	0	0	0	0	—	0	0	0	0	0	Cowboys	24	28	6 1

Notes:

- Australia also announced a Prime Minister's XIII squad for a match on 12 October 2025.
- Three members of the squad have previously played for other nations:
  - Samoa : Sarah Togatuki (in 2019), Sienna Lofipo (in 2023 and 2024).
  - Tonga : Tiana Penitani (in 2023, having played for Australia in 2019).
- Sienna Lofipo was named to play for Australia in the initial announcement on 6 October, but pledged her allegiance to Samoa and the next, day, 7 October 2025 was named in the Samoan squad. Consequently, Lofipo withdrew from the Jillaroos squad.
- On 10 October, the NRL announced two changes to the squad, with Emma Verran as well as Lofipo withdrawing. They were replaced by Abbi Church and Makenzie Weale.
- Six of the 21 squad members have played for Queensland, thirteen for New South Wales. The two players yet to play Origin, Butler and Whitfeld qualify for New South Wales.
- The number of squad members with other representative credits are:
  - Indigenous All Stars 4 (Dodd, Joseph, Kernick, Upton)
  - Māori All Stars 2 (Butler, Kernick)
  - NRL All Stars: 3 (Apps, Brigginshaw, and Kelly)
  - Prime Minister's XIII: 9
  - NSW City 5 (Butler, Dodd, Penitani, Sergis, Togatuki)
  - NSW Country 5 (Apps, Davis, Johnston, Kelleher, Kelly).

=== New Zealand ===
The Kiwi Ferns squad was announced on 7 October 2025.

Jersey numbers in the table reflect selections for the Final versus Australia Jillaroos

J#	Player	Age	Position(s)	Tournament					Kiwi Ferns Career						Club Competitions			Other Representative Matches
J#	Player	Age	Position(s)	Tournament					Kiwi Ferns Career						2025 Club	Matches		Other Representative Matches
J#	Player	Age	Position(s)	M	T	G	F	P	Dbt	M	T	G	F	P	2025 Club	T1	T2	Other Representative Matches
1	Apii Nicholls	32	Fullback	3	0	0	0	0	2017	19	5	6	0	32	Warriors	38	0	—
2	Tysha Ikenasio	28	Wing, Centre	2	1	0	0	4	2025	2	1	0	0	4	Warriors	8	0	—
3	Mele Hufanga	31	Centre	3	1	0	0	4	2022	13	7	0	0	28	Broncos	33	0	—
4	Abigail Roache	29	Centre, Wing	3	0	0	0	0	2022	11	3	0	0	12	Cowboys	30	0	—
5	Shanice Parker	27	Wing, Centre	3	2	0	0	8	2022	11	3	0	0	12	Knights	46	32	1 1 4 2
14	Tyla King	31	Five-eighth, Halfback	1	0	0	0	0	2024	4	0	4	0	8	Sharks	21	0	1
7	Raecene McGregor	28	Halfback	3	0	0	0	0	2017	18	9	5	0	46	Dragons	48	40	5
8	Angelina Teakaraanga-Katoa	23	Prop	3	0	0	0	0	2023	9	1	0	0	4	Bulldogs	29	18	—
9	Brooke Anderson	29	Hooker, Lock	3	0	0	0	0	2023	9	0	0	0	0	Sharks	37	15	1 2 2
10	Tiana Davison	25	Prop, Second-row	2	0	0	0	0	2023	5	0	0	0	0	Knights	29	12	—
11	Annessa Biddle	22	Second-row, Centre	3	1	0	0	4	2023	8	3	0	0	12	Sharks	26	0	2
12	Otesa Pule	22	Second-row, Centre	3	0	0	0	0	2022	13	1	0	0	4	Roosters	40	22	—
13	Georgia Hale	30	Lock	3	0	0	0	0	2015	23	0	0	0	0	Titans	50	16	—
6	Ashleigh Quinlan	30	Five-eighth	3	1	0	0	4	2023	8	2	0	0	8	Bulldogs	33	24	3 1
15	Shaniece Monschau	23	Second-row, Prop	2	0	0	0	0	2025	2	0	0	0	0	Bulldogs	11	10	—
16	Alexis Tauaneai	20	Prop, Lock	3	1	0	0	4	2024	6	1	0	0	4	Bulldogs	24	5	—
17	Ivana Lauitiiti	19	Prop	3	0	0	0	0	2025	3	0	0	0	0	Warriors	6	0	—
18	Shakira Baker	33	Second-row, Centre	1	0	0	0	0	2025	1	0	0	0	0	Warriors	8	0	—
19	Patricia Maliepo	22	Five-eighth	2	0	3	0	6	2025	2	0	3	0	6	Warriors	9	0	—
20	Trinity Tauaneai	18	Lock, Prop	0	0	0	0	0	—	0	0	0	0	0	Dragons	9		—
C	Leianne Tufuga	23	Wing, Centre	1	0	0	0	0	2023	7	4	0	0	16	Raiders	39	30	1 2
S	Brianna Clark	30	Prop	1	0	0	0	0	2022	9	1	7	0	18	Broncos	37	19	1 1

Notes

- Eight squad members have previously played for Australasian based representative teams:
  - Samoa (1): Tufuga
  - Māori All Stars (6): Anderson, Biddle, King, McGregor, Parker, and Quinlan
  - New South Wales (2): Anderson and Parker
  - NSW City (3): Anderson, Parker and Tufuga
  - NRL All Stars (1): Parker
  - Australian Prime Minister's XIII: Clark
- Players unavailable due to injury include: Madison Bartlett, Jasmine Solia, and Brooke Talataina.
- Mya Hill-Moana missed the 2025 NRLW season due to pregnancy.
- Gayle Broughton was unavailable due to personal reasons.
- The team announcement listed an additional eight players as members of the wider squad: Jasmin Strange (Roosters), Mackenzie Wiki (Raiders), Matekino Gray (Warriors), Moana Courtenay (Bulldogs), Payton Takimoana (Warriors), Tenika Willison (Knights), Trinity Tauaneai (Dragons), and Martha Mataele (Eels). Mataele was selected for Samoa.
- The NZRL announcement noted that Amber Hall was unavailable due to playing for Samoa instead. The Samoa squad announcement did not initially include Hall in their list 21 players. Hall had missed the 2025 NRLW Grand Final due to a calf injury.

=== Samoa ===
The Fetu Samoa squad was announced on 7 October 2025.

Jersey numbers in the table reflect selections for the Round 2 match versus the Australian Jillaroos

J#	Player	Age	Position(s)	Tournament					Fetu Samoa Career						Club Competitions			Other Representative Matches
J#	Player	Age	Position(s)	Tournament					Fetu Samoa Career						2025 Club	Matches		Other Representative Matches
J#	Player	Age	Position(s)	M	T	G	F	P	Dbt	M	T	G	F	P	2025 Club	T1	T2	Other Representative Matches
1	Destiny Mino-Sinapati	20	Fullback, Wing	2	1	0	0	4	2023	3	1	0	0	4	Titans	13	9	—
2	Jessica Patea	18	Wing, Centre	2	0	0	0	0	2024	5	4	0	0	16	Steelers	0	17	—
3	Lindsay Tui	20	Centre, Wing	2	0	0	0	0	2023	6	4	0	0	16	Eels	18	2	—
4	Sarina Masaga	20	Centre, Second-row	2	1	0	0	4	2024	5	3	0	0	12	Titans	11	5	—
5	Mercedez Taulelei-Siala	19	Wing, Centre	1	0	0	0	0	2024	4	1	0	0	4	Knights	1	10	—
6	Taliah Fuimaono	26	Five-eighth	2	0	0	0	0	2022	5	1	0	0	4	Titans	29	40	3 5 5
7	Jetaya Faifua	22	Halfback, Fullback	2	0	0	0	0	2024	5	1	0	0	4	Tigers	29	24	—
8	Annetta Nu'uausala	30	Prop, Lock	2	0	0	0	0	2023	6	3	0	0	12	Broncos	35	11	14
9	Destiny Brill	22	Hooker	2	0	0	0	0	2023	5	0	0	0	0	Broncos	41	26	8 2
10	Eliza Lopamaua	20	Prop, Second-row	2	0	0	0	0	2025	2	0	0	0	0	Roosters	15	7	—
11	Tavarna Papalii	20	Second-row, Lock	2	1	0	0	4	2024	5	1	0	0	4	Roosters	8	6	3
12	Ryvrr-Lee Alo	19	Second-row, Lock	2	0	0	0	0	2024	3	0	0	0	0	Eels	10	8	1
17	Shalom Sauaso	18	Lock, Centre	2	1	0	0	4	2025	2	1	0	0	4	Broncos	10	0	—
14	Ella-Jaye Harrison-Leaunoa	18	Five-eighth	2	0	0	0	0	2024	3	0	0	0	0	Jets	0	11	—
15	Laikha Clarke	24	Prop	2	0	0	0	0	2024	4	0	0	0	0	Titans	29	19	2 1
16	Jaydika Tafua	19	Second-row	1	0	0	0	0	2025	1	0	0	0	0	Sharks	9	10 '	—
13	Pihuka Berryman-Duff	24	Five-eighth	2	0	0	0	0	2023	6	0	0	0	0	Tigers	20	14	—
18	Simone Karpani	28	Prop, Lock	0	0	0	0	0	2024	3	0	0	0	0	Knights	33	13	1
–	Estanoa Faitala-Mariner	20	Centre, Wing	0	0	0	0	0	—	0	0	0	0	0	Titans	5	11	—
–	Monica Tagoai	27	Centre	0	0	0	0	0	—	0	0	0	0	0	Bulldogs	8	0	—
C	Sienna Lofipo	20	Lock, Hooker	1	0	0	0	0	2025	1	0	0	0	0	Titans	24	15	4 4
–	Pauline Piliae-Rasabale	32	Halfback, Fullback	1	0	2	0	4	2023	5	0	15	0	30	Titans	24	18	—
–	Niall Williams-Guthrie	37	Centre	0	0	0	0	0	2023	1	0	0	0	0	Titans	17	4	—

Notes:

- Sienna Lofipo was included in the Australian team announced on 6 October but has elected to play for Samoa.
- The shading in the Clubs column of the above table indicates players selected from teams outside the 2025 NRLW.
  - Ipswich Jets (QRL BMDWP): Ella-Jaye Harrison-Leaunoa
  - Illawarra Steelers (NSW HNWP):Jessica Patea
- Niall Williams-Guthrie was contracted to the Gold Coast Titans for 2025 but due to an injury did not appear in any NRLW matches. Williams-Guthrie did make four appearances for the Tweed Heads Seagulls towards the end of the QRL BMDWP season.
- Monica Tagoai and Jaydika Tafua were added to the squad ahead of the Round 2 match.
- Eighteen members of the squad played in the 2025 NRLW season.
- Three members of the squad have previously played for another nation:
  - Australia (1): Fuimaono
  - Cook Islands (1): Alo
  - New Zealand (1): Nu'uausala
- Six squad members have previously played for Australasian based representative teams:
  - Māori All Stars (2): Brill, Clarke
  - Prime Minister’s XIII (3): Clarke
  - Queensland (3): Brill, Lofipo, Papalii
  - NSW (1): Fuimaono
  - NRL All Stars (1): Karpani
- Evania Isa'ako (nee Pelite) was unavailable after missing the 2025 NRLW season due to her pregnancy.
- Players unavailable due to injury include: Christian Pio (hamstring) and Monalisa Soliola (leg).

== Pacific Bowl women ==
=== Cook Islands ===
The Cook Islands Moana squad was announced on social media on 7 October 2025.

Jersey numbers in the table reflect selections for the Round 2 match versus Tonga

J#	Player	Age	Position(s)	Tournament					Moana Career						Club Competitions			Other Representative Matches
J#	Player	Age	Position(s)	Tournament					Moana Career						2025 Club	Matches		Other Representative Matches
J#	Player	Age	Position(s)	M	T	G	F	P	Dbt	M	T	G	F	P	2025 Club	T1	T2	Other Representative Matches
1	Kiana Takairangi	33	Fullback, Centre	2	0	0	0	0	2017	8	1	0	0	4	Eels	15	55	2 1 3
2	Kiarah Siauane	20	Wing, Centre	2	2	0	0	8	2024	3	2	0	0	8	Magpies	0	16	—
3	Keira Rangi	18	Centre, Second-row	1	0	0	0	0	2025	1	0	0	0	0	Magpies	0	10	—
4	Deleni Paitai	18	Centre	2	1	0	0	4	2025	2	1	0	0	4	Bears	0	11	—
5	Paulina Morris-Ponga	—	Wing, Centre	2	4	0	0	16	2023	3	4	0	0	16	Lions	0	0	—
6	Lydia Turua-Quedley	26	Five-eighth, Halfback	2	0	0	0	0	2017	7	0	0	0	0	Warriors	11	0	—
7	Chantay Kiria-Ratu	21	Halfback, Five-eighth	2	1	8	0	20	2022	4	1	10	0	24	Sharks	24	18	—
8	Lavinia Kitai	21	Prop	2	0	0	0	0	2022	7	0	0	0	0	Warriors	11	24	—
9	Pearl Tuitama	—	Hooker	2	0	0	0	0	2025	2	0	0	0	0	Jets	0	12	—
10	Ashlee Matapo	19	Prop	2	0	0	0	0	2025	2	0	0	0	0	Warriors	8	0	—
11	Anne-Marie Kiria-Ratu	—	Second-row	2	0	0	0	0	2025	2	0	0	0	0	Sharks	9	2	—
19	Kaiyah Atai	24	Second-row, Centre	2	0	0	0	0	2023	4	0	0	0	0	Warriors	11	0	—
13	Jazmon Tupou-Witchman	21	Lock, Prop	2	1	0	0	4	2022	7	1	0	0	4	Rabbitohs	3	39	—
14	Kerehitina Matua	26	Second-row	2	3	0	0	12	2022	7	4	3	0	22	Raiders	20	17	4
15	Porche John	18	Prop	1	0	0	0	0	2025	1	0	0	0	0	Tigers	0	12	—
16	Ngatokotoru Arakua	28	Prop	2	1	0	0	4	2023	3	1	0	0	4	Titans	15	17	9
17	Jodeci Joseph	—	Centre	1	0	0	0	0	2023	3	0	0	0	0	Papakura	0	0	—
18	Memory Paitai	19	Five-eighth, Second-row	1	1	0	0	4	2025	1	1	0	0	4	Bears	0	10	—
12	April Ngatupuna	22	Prop, Lock	1	0	0	0	0	2022	5	1	0	0	4	Magpies	11	28	—
20	Hannah Makira	19	Wing, Centre	1	1	0	0	4	2025	1	1	0	0	4	Bulldogs	0	8	—

Notes

- The shading in the Clubs column of the above table indicates players selected from teams outside the 2025 NRLW.
  - QRL BMD WP
    - Brisbane Tigers (1): Porche John
    - Burleigh Bears (2): Deleni Paitai, Memory Paitai
    - Ipswich Jets (1): Pearl Tuitama
    - Souths Logan Magpies (3): April Ngatupuna, Keira Rangi, Kiarah Siauane
  - NSW HNWP
    - Canterbury Bulldogs (1): Hannah Makira
    - South Sydney Rabbitohs (1): Jazmon Tupou-Witchman
  - Auckland Rugby League
    - Mt Albert Lions (1): Paulina Morris-Ponga
    - Papakura Sea Eagles (1): Jodeci Joseph

=== Papua New Guinea ===
The PNG Orchids squad was announced with the selection of the team for Round 1 on 14 October 2025. This followed the Prime Minister's XII match on 12 October 2025.

Jersey numbers in the table reflect selections for the Round 3 match versus Tonga

J#	Player	Age	Position(s)	Tournament					PNG Orchids Career						Club Competitions			Other Representative Matches
J#	Player	Age	Position(s)	Tournament					PNG Orchids Career						2025 Club	Matches		Other Representative Matches
J#	Player	Age	Position(s)	M	T	G	F	P	Dbt	M	T	G	F	P	2025 Club	T1	T2	Other Representative Matches
1	Fleur Ginn	19	Fullback, Centre	2	0	0	0	0	2025	2	0	0	0	0	Eels	11		1
2	Ruth Gende	20	Wing, Centre	2	0	0	0	0	2025	2	0	0	0	0	Port Moresby Vipers	0		1
3	Tia Molo	—	Centre	2	0	0	0	0	2025	2	0	0	0	0	Dolphins	0	0	—
4	Relna Wuruki-Hosea	20	Centre, Wing	1	0	0	0	0	2025	1	0	0	0	0	Raiders	6		1
5	Naomi Kelly	25	Wing	2	1	0	0	4	2025	2	1	0	0	4	Central Dabaris	0		1
6	India Seeto	19	Five-eighth	2	0	0	0	0	2025	2	0	0	0	0	Tigers	0		1
7	Caitlin Tanner	19	Halfback	2	0	0	0	0	2025	2	0	0	0	0	Cowboys	0		1
8	Elsie Albert	29	Prop	2	0	0	0	0	2019	12	3	0	0	12	Eels	35	15	3 2
9	Emily Veivers	24	Hooker, Second-row	2	1	2	0	8	2022	9	1	8	0	20	—	0	21	1 4
10	Gloria Kaupa	25	Prop, Lock	2	0	0	0	0	2017	14	0	0	0	0	Tigers	0	9	1 4
11	Sareka Mooka	25	Second-row, Lock	2	0	0	0	0	2023	6	0	0	0	0	Cowboys	12	25	1 1 2
16	Marie Biyama	27	Second-row, Centre	2	0	0	0	0	2025	2	0	0	0	0	Clydesdales	0		1
13	Jessikah Reeves	24	Lock, Prop	2	0	0	0	0	2022	10	1	0	0	4	Tigers	8	31	1 4
14	Therese Aiton	36	Hooker	2	0	0	0	0	2019	8	1	0	0	4	Clydesdales	2	27	2 1 3
15	Emmogen Taumafai	22	Prop	2	0	0	0	0	2025	2	0	0	0	0	Falcons	0		1
12	Mya Muller	—	Second-row, Lock	1	0	0	0	0	2025	1	0	0	0	0	Panthers	0	0	—
17	Belinda Gwasamun	28	Centre	2	0	0	0	0	2022	10	5	0	0	20	Mt Hagen Eagles	0	15	1 3
18	Mala Mark	28	Wing, Fullback	0	0	0	0	0	2017	3	0	0	0	0	Central Dabaris	0	6	4
19	Delailah Ahose	32	Halfback, Hooker	0	0	0	0	0	2017	5	0	0	0	0	Goroka Lahanis	0	7	1 2
20	Leila Kerowa	—	Centre, Second-row	1	0	0	0	0	2023	5	1	0	0	4	Central Dabaris	0	5	3
IJ	Essay Banu	23	Prop, Second-row	1	0	0	0	0	2022	9	2	0	0	8	Cowboys	20	23	1 2 4

Notes:

- Tia Molo and Mya Muller were elevated into the national team from the Junior Orchids team that played the Australian Schoolgirls on 12 October 2025. Both had played in Under 19 competitions in Australia in 2025. Tia Molo for the Redcliffe Dolphins in Queensland and Mya Muller for the Penrith Panthers in the NSW Tarsha Gale Cup.
- The Other Reps columns include matches:
  - against the Australian Prime Minister's XIII
  - against Far North Queensland, Brisbane Broncos, and York Valkyrie.
  - for the Australian Prime Minister's XIII: Sareka Mooka.
  - for Queensland: Therese Aiton.
  - for the Indigenous All Stars: Essay Banu and Sareka Mooka.

=== Tonga ===
The Tonga squad was announced on 7 October 2025. The team is coached by Meg Ward.

Jersey numbers in the table reflect the Round 3 match versus the PNG Orchids

J#	Player	Age	Position(s)	Tournament					Mate Ma'a Tonga Career						Club Competitions			Other Representative Matches
J#	Player	Age	Position(s)	Tournament					Mate Ma'a Tonga Career						2024 Club	Matches		Other Representative Matches
J#	Player	Age	Position(s)	M	T	G	F	P	Dbt	M	T	G	F	P	2024 Club	T1	T2	Other Representative Matches
1	Ana Malupo	19	Fullback, Wing	2	0	0	0	0	2025	2	0	0	0	0	Cowboys	3	6	—
2	Moana Courtenay	25	Wing, Centre	2	2	0	0	8	2025	2	2	0	0	8	Bulldogs	10	0	—
3	Fane Finau	19	Centre, Second-row	2	0	0	0	0	2025	2	0	0	0	0	Knights	4	20	—
4	Martha Mataele	26	Centre, Wing	2	3	0	0	12	2025	2	3	0	0	12	Eels	11	0	—
5	Simina Lokotui	19	Wing, Centre	2	2	0	0	8	2025	2	2	0	0	8	Bulldogs	7	3	—
6	Malia Tu'Ifua	—	Five-eighth, Prop	2	1	0	0	4	2025	2	1	0	0	4	—	0	27	—
7	Emmanita Paki	22	Halfback, Centre	2	1	5	0	14	2024	3	1	7	0	18	Warriors	15	23	2
8	Natasha Penitani	25	Prop, Lock	2	0	0	0	0	2022	5	0	0	0	0	Titans	21	23	—
9	Seli Mailangi	28	Hooker	2	1	0	0	4	2022	5	1	0	0	4	Rabbitohs	12	48	—
17	Ruby Fifita	25	Prop	2	1	0	0	4	2025	2	1	0	0	4	Tigers	3	8	—
11	Shannon Muru	27	Second-row	2	1	0	0	4	2022	4	1	0	0	4	Bulldogs	14	28	—
16	Tatiana Finau	21	Second-row	2	0	0	0	0	2025	2	0	0	0	0	Raiders	9	6	—
13	Amelia Huakau	30	Lock, Second-row	2	0	0	0	0	2022	4	0	0	0	0	Tigers	21	32	—
10	Kalosipani Hopoate	21	Prop	2	1	0	0	4	2022	4	1	0	0	4	Bulldogs	34	13	1
15	Jade Fonua	28	Lock	2	1	0	0	4	2023	4	1	0	0	4	Tigers	25	0	—
18	Pauline Suli-Ruka	18	Second-row	2	0	0	0	0	2025	2	0	0	0	0	Bulldogs	5	13	1
20	Paea Uilou	20	Prop	1	0	0	0	0	2024	2	0	0	0	0	Bulldogs	4	7	—
21	Vanessa Foliaki	32	Second-row	0	0	0	0	0	2023	2	0	0	0	0	—	38	15	6 6 1 1 1
–	Manilita Takapautolo	19	Second-row, Prop	0	0	0	0	0	2024	1	1	0	0	4	Sharks	20	2	—
–	Kaylani Tavita	—	Hooker	1	0	0	0	0	2025	1	0	0	0	0	Magpies	0	10	—
S	Aliyah Nasio	19	Second-row, Lock	0	0	0	0	0	—	0	0	0	0	0	Roosters	16	10	1
–	Lavinia Tauhalaliku	26	Wing	0	0	0	0	0	2022	3	1	0	0	4	Warriors	7	7	1

Notes:

- Paea Uilou was added to the squad ahead of the Round 2 match and assistant coach Vanessa Foliaki was named as a reserve.
- The shading in the Clubs column of the above table indicates players selected from teams outside the 2025 NRLW.
  - South Sydney Rabbitohs (HNWP): Mailangi
  - Souths Logan Magpies (BMDWP): Tavita
- Malia Tu'Ifua played in the NSWRL Women's Premiership in 2018, 2019 and 2021.
- Several members of the squad have previously played for other representative teams:
  - New Zealand: Tauhalaliku
  - Māori All Stars: Suli-Ruka
  - Queensland: Paki
  - NSW City: Hopoate and Nasio.
- Players unavailable due to injury include: Tegan Dymock, Filomina Hanisi and Cassey Tohi-Hiku.
- 2024 joint captain Vanessa Foliaki retired from playing and was appointed as assistant coach to Meg Ward.

== Key to acronyms ==
The following acronyms and abbreviations are used in the above tables:

- J# — Jersey Number
- Tournament - Appearance and scoring tallies within the 2024 Championships. Will be blank until matches are played.
  - M — Matches
  - T — Tries
  - G — Goals
  - F — Field Goals (also known as Drop goals)
  - P — Points
- International Career basic statistics appear under the team moniker - e.g. **Kiwi Ferns Career** for the New Zealand women's team.
  - Dbt — Debut Year. Where a player has played for two or more nations. the year displayed reflects the first appearance foe their current team.
- Club Competitions
  - 2025 Club
  - Where a player's 2025 club is outside the Super League, NRL or NRLW it is shaded in the table.
  - Matches - Tally of games played in club competitions
    - T1 — Tier 1 club competitions.
      - For men: Super League and National Rugby League
      - For women: National Rugby League Women's Premiership. This is the tier 1 competition for women in Australia. No players have been selected from the RFL Women's Super League in England.
    - T2 — Tier 2 club competitions.
      - For men: RFL Championship in England and France; and the Queensland Cup and NSW Cup in Australasia.
      - For women: Matches played between 2021 and 2025 in the NSWRL Women's Premiership and or QRL Women's Premiership.
    - Numbers in **bold** indicate that the player has played all his matches at that tier for their current club.
- Other Representative Matches — An icon and number of matches is used.
