= 2025 Rugby League Pacific Championships =

Rugby League event

- Number of teams: 6 (men); 6 (women)
- Host countries: New Zealand; Papua New Guinea; Australia
- Winner: Men's Cup: New Zealand; Men's Bowl: Papua New Guinea; Women's Cup: Australia; Women's Bowl: Cook Islands

The 2025 Rugby League Pacific Championships were the fourth edition of the Rugby League Pacific Championships and the third under their current name (having previously been called the Oceania Cup in 2019). The championships consisted of several international rugby league tournaments being played from October to November 2025 between nations of the Pacific region.

Like previous editions, a Men's Pacific Cup, Men's Pacific Bowl, Women's Pacific Cup, and Women's Pacific Bowl was played.

The draw was announced by the International Rugby League and National Rugby League on 6 August 2025.

== Teams ==
=== Team changes ===
Following the results of the promotion / relegation playoffs in 2024, New Zealand remained in the Men's Pacific Cup, while Samoa were promoted to the Women's Pacific Cup after defeating Papua New Guinea.

2025 saw the return of the Ashes between Australia and England. The series was originally set to be held in Australia, though switched to England due to Australia hosting the 2026 Rugby League World Cup. As a result, Australia did not compete in the Men's Pacific Cup. Samoa took their place after returning to the competition following their 2024 tour of England. Originally, a women's Ashes series was also scheduled, however this never materialised and Australia were confirmed as participants for the Women's Pacific Cup on 22 July.

Furthermore, the Cook Islands, while still participating in the tournament, hosted South Africa for a place in the 2026 Men's World Cup, with the match being played as a curtain raiser to the Cup finals. Conversely, Fiji were unavailable for the Women's Pacific Bowl due to competing in World Cup qualifiers in Canada.

=== Men's teams ===
Competition	Team	World ranking	Coach	Captain	Ref
Pacific Cup	New Zealand	2	(New Zealand) Stacey Jones	James Fisher-Harris	
Pacific Cup	Samoa	5	(Australia) Ben Gardiner	Jarome Luai and Junior Paulo	
Pacific Cup	Tonga	4	(Australia) Kristian Woolf	Addin Fonua-Blake and Jason Taumalolo	
Pacific Bowl	Cook Islands	10	(Australia) Karmichael Hunt	KL Iro (Note: KL Iro was named captain for the Round 1 match after 2024 captain and 2025 selection Brad Takairangi withdrew due to an injury. Takairangi played for South West Goannas in the 2025 Macarthur Rugby League season.)	
Pacific Bowl	Fiji	7	(Fiji) Wise Kativerata	Tui Kamikamica	
Pacific Bowl	Papua New Guinea	6	(Australia) Jason Demetriou	Rhyse Martin	

- Australia (ranked 1st) undertook a tour of England with three tests scheduled for consecutive Saturdays: 25 October, 1 November, and 8 November 2025. Kevin Walters was appointed coach.

=== Women's teams ===
Competition	Team	World ranking	Coach	Captain(s)	Ref
Pacific Cup	Australia	1	(Australia) Jess Skinner	Kezie Apps and Ali Brigginshaw	
Pacific Cup	New Zealand	2	(New Zealand) Ricky Henry	Georgia Hale and Raecene McGregor	
Pacific Cup	Samoa	12	(Australia) Jamie Soward	Annetta-Claudia Nuuausala	
Pacific Bowl	Cook Islands	9	(Australia) Ronald Griffiths	Kiana Takairangi	
Pacific Bowl	Papua New Guinea	5	(Australia) Tahnee Norris	Elsie Albert	
Pacific Bowl	Tonga	15	(Australia) Meg Ward	Natasha Penitani (Note: Vanessa Foliaki, co-captain of Tonga in the 2024 tournament, announced her retirement in July 2025. In mid-August, Foliaki was subsequently appointed assistant coach to Meg Ward.)	

- Fiji (ranked 16th) participated in the World Series in Canada, playing two matches, on 21 and 26 October 2025. The coach is Josaia Dakuitoga. The 2024 captain Talei Holmes was initially named in the extended squad but was not named in the final squad.

== Venues ==
Venues in Papua New Guinea, New Zealand, and Australia have been confirmed.

Host venues
1 PNG Football Stadium, Port Moresby
2 Mount Smart Stadium, Auckland
3 Lang Park, Brisbane
4 Eden Park, Auckland
5 Western Sydney Stadium, Sydney

Six venues across four countries were selected to host the Championships.

- Port Moresby, Papua New Guinea: PNG Football Stadium will host three Pacific Bowl double-headers on consecutive Saturdays, 18 and 25 October, and 1 November 2025.
- Auckland, New Zealand: Mount Smart Stadium will host two matches on Sunday, 19 October 2025, a women's and men's double-header between New Zealand and Samoa.
- Brisbane, Australia: Lang Park will host two matches on Sunday, 26 October 2025, Samoa playing Australia in the women's Cup and Tonga in the men's Cup.
- Auckland, New Zealand: Eden Park will host two matches on Sunday, 2 November 2025, New Zealand playing Australia in the women's Cup and Tonga in the men's Cup.
- Sydney, Australia: Western Sydney Stadium will host three matches on Sunday, 9 November 2025: a men's World Cup qualifier playoff between the Cook Islands and South Africa, the women's Cup final, and the men's Cup final.

== Men's Pacific Cup ==
Pos	Team	Pld	W	D	L	PF	PA	PD	Pts	Qualification
1	New Zealand	2	2	0	0	64	32	+32	4	Advance to final
2	Samoa	2	1	0	1	52	30	+22	2	Advance to final
3	Tonga	2	0	0	2	20	74	−54	0	

Updated to match(es) played on 19 October 2025. Source: NRL

=== Fixtures ===
==== Group stage ====
19 October 2025
18:05 NZDT (UTC+13:00)

New Zealand	24–18	Samoa
Tries: 4 McLean 9', 21'; Timoko 40'; Brown 73'; Goals: 4 Isaako 11', 23', pen 63', 74' (4/5)	1st: 16–12; 2nd: 8–6; Report	Tries: 3 Mariner 26'; Sasagi 32'; Taulagi 69'; Goals: 3 Talagi 28', 34', 71' (3/3)

Mount Smart Stadium, Auckland
Attendance: 21,251
Referee: Peter Gough
Touch judges: Drew Oultram, Wyatt Raymond
Player of the Match: Dylan Brown (New Zealand)

Team details
New Zealand		Position	Samoa
Name	Number	Position	Number	Name
Charnze Nicoll-Klokstad	1	FB	1	Roger Tuivasa-Sheck
Jamayne Isaako	2	WG	2	Brian To'o
Matthew Timoko	3	CE	3	Izack Tago
Casey McLean	4	CE	4	Deine Mariner
Ronaldo Mulitalo	5	WG	5	Murray Taulagi
Dylan Brown	6	FE	6	Blaize Talagi
Kieran Foran	7	HB	7	Jarome Luai (c)
James Fisher-Harris (c)	8	PR	8	Josh Papali'i
Jeremy Marshall-King	9	HK	9	Jazz Tevaga
Moses Leota	10	PF	10	Payne Haas
Briton Nikora	11	SR	11	Jeremiah Nanai
Isaiah Papali'i	12	SR	12	Jaydn Su'A
Joseph Tapine	13	LK	13	Junior Paulo (c)
Phoenix Crossland	14	IN	14	Chanel Harris-Tavita
Naufahu Whyte	15	IN	15	Simi Sasagi
Erin Clark	16	IN	17	Francis Molo
Nelson Asofa-Solomona	17	IN	19	Ata Mariota
Xavier Willison	18	CS	18	Benaiah Ioelu
Stacey Jones		Coach		Ben Gardiner

26 October 2025
15:00 AEST (UTC+10:00)

Tonga	6–34	Samoa
Tries: 1 Koula 78'; Goals: 1 Katoa 78' (1/1)	1st: 0–12; 2nd: 6–22; Report	Tries: 6 Nanai 28', 46'; Tago 8'; Taulagi 61'; Haas 65'; Harris-Tavita 75'; Goals: 5 Talagi pen 18', 29', 63', 66', 77' (5/7)

Lang Park, Brisbane
Attendance: 44,682
Referee: Todd Smith
Player of the Match: Junior Paulo (Samoa)

Team details
Tonga		Position	Samoa
Name	Number	Position	Number	Name
Lehi Hopoate	1	FB	1	Roger Tuivasa-Sheck
Daniel Tupou	2	WG	2	Brian To'o
Toluta'u Koula	3	CE	3	Izack Tago
Robert Toia	4	CE	4	Deine Mariner
Sione Katoa	5	WG	5	Murray Taulagi
Isaiah Iongi	6	FE	6	Blaize Talagi
Isaiya Katoa	7	HB	7	Jarome Luai (c)
Addin Fonua-Blake (c)	8	PR	17	Francis Molo
Siliva Havili	9	HK	15	Benaiah Ioelu
Stefano Utoikamanu	10	PF	10	Payne Haas
Leka Halasima	15	SR	11	Jeremiah Nanai
Eliesa Katoa	12	SR	12	Simi Sasagi
Felise Kaufusi	16	LK	13	Junior Paulo (c)
Siua Wong	11	IN	8	Josh Papali'i
Soni Luke	14	IN	9	Jazz Tevaga
Moeaki Fotuaika	17	IN	14	Chanel Harris-Tavita
Demetric Vaimauga	18	IN	20	Terrell May
Paul Alamoti	19	CS	16	Ativalu Lisati
Kristian Woolf		Coach		Ben Gardiner

2 November 2025
18:05 NZDT (UTC+13:00)

New Zealand	40–14	Tonga
Tries: 7 Brown 23', 64'; Kini 18'; McLean 28'; Timoko 36'; Nicoll-Klokstad 51'; Crossland 70'; Goals: 6 Isaako 19', 25', 29', 37', 43', 66' (6/8); Sin bin: Erin Clark (yellow card) 40' to 50'	1st: 24-2; 2nd: 16-12; Report	Tries: 2 Vaimauga 48'; Tupou 75'; Goals: 3 Katoa 39', 49', 75' (3/3)

Eden Park, Auckland
Attendance: 38,114
Referee: Ashley Klein
Player of the Match: Dylan Brown (New Zealand)

Team details
New Zealand		Position	Tonga
Name	Number	Position	Number	Name
Charnze Nicoll-Klokstad	1	FB	1	Lehi Hopoate
Jamayne Isaako	2	WG	2	Daniel Tupou
Matthew Timoko	3	CE	19	Will Penisini
Casey McLean	4	CE	4	Paul Alamoti
Keano Kini	20	WG	5	Sione Katoa
Dylan Brown	6	FE	6	Isaiah Iongi
Kieran Foran	7	HB	7	Isaiya Katoa
James Fisher-Harris (c)	8	PR	8	Addin Fonua-Blake (c)
Phoenix Crossland	9	HK	9	Siliva Havili
Moses Leota	10	PF	16	Moeaki Fotuaika
Briton Nikora	11	SR	11	Eliesa Katoa
Isaiah Papali'i	12	SR	15	Kulikefu Finefeuiaki
Joseph Tapine	13	LK	13	Jason Taumalolo (c)
Te Maire Martin	14	IN	10	Felise Kaufusi
Naufahu Whyte	15	IN	12	Siua Wong
Erin Clark	16	IN	14	Soni Luke
Xavier Willison	17	IN	17	Demetric Vaimauga
Nelson Asofa-Solomona	18	CS	18	Leka Halasima
Stacey Jones		Coach		Kristian Woolf

==== Men's final ====
9 November 2025
16:05 AEDT (UTC+11:00)

New Zealand	36–14	Samoa
Tries: 6 Papali'i 49', 76'; Whyte 33'; Clark 56'; McLean 67'; Nicoll-Klokstad 78'; Goals: 6 Isaako 34', 50', pen 53', 58', pen 75', 79' (6/8)	1st: 6-14; 2nd: 30-0; Report	Tries: 2 To'o 11'; Sasagi 28'; Goals: 3 Talagi 12', 30', pen 40' (3/3)

Western Sydney Stadium, Sydney
Attendance: 28,084
Referee: Ashley Klein
Video referee: Chris Butler
Touch judges: Drew Oultram, Dave Munro
Player of the Match: Dylan Brown (New Zealand)

Team details
New Zealand		Position	Samoa
Name	Number	Position	Number	Name
Keano Kini	1	FB	1	Roger Tuivasa-Sheck
Jamayne Isaako	2	WG	2	Brian To'o
Matthew Timoko	3	CE	3	Izack Tago
Charnze Nicoll-Klokstad	4	CE	4	Deine Mariner
Casey McLean	5	WG	5	Murray Taulagi
Dylan Brown	6	FE	6	Blaize Talagi
Kieran Foran	7	HB	7	Jarome Luai (c)
James Fisher-Harris (c)	8	PR	8	Francis Molo (c)
Phoenix Crossland	9	HK	9	Jazz Tevaga
Moses Leota	10	PF	10	Payne Haas
Briton Nikora	11	SR	11	Jaydn Su'A
Isaiah Papali'i	12	SR	12	Simi Sasagi
Joseph Tapine	13	LK	13	Junior Paulo (c)
Te Maire Martin	14	IN	14	Chanel Harris-Tavita
Naufahu Whyte	15	IN	15	Benaiah Ioelu
Erin Clark	16	IN	16	Terrell May
Xavier Willison	17	IN	17	Josh Papali'i
Scott Sorensen (not used)	18	CS	18	Ata Mariota (not used)
Stacey Jones		Coach		Ben Gardiner

== Men's Pacific Bowl ==
Pos	Team	Pld	W	D	L	PF	PA	PD	Pts	Qualification
1	Papua New Guinea	2	2	0	0	90	46	+44	4	Winner
2	Fiji	2	1	0	1	62	74	−12	2	
3	Cook Islands	2	0	0	2	52	84	−32	0	

Updated to match(es) played on 18 October 2025. Source: NRL

=== Fixtures ===
The announced schedule for the Men's Pacific Bowl does not include a final or play-off/relegation match.

18 October 2025
15:00 PNGST (UTC+10:00)

Fiji	44–24	Cook Islands
Tries: 8 Bula 5', 8', 12', 37'; Navale 20'; Kautoga 60'; Donoghoe 66'; Saukuru 76'; Goals: 6 Wakeham 6', 10', 14', 21', 62', 67' (6/8)	1st: 28–6; 2nd: 16–18; Report	Tries: 4 Iro 26'; Makirere 54'; Rennie 63'; Petterson-Robati 79'; Goals: 4 Ioka 28', 55', 64', 79' (4/4)

PNG Football Stadium, Port Moresby
Referee: Liam Kennedy

Team details
Fiji		Position	Cook Islands
Name	Number	Position	Number	Name
Jahream Bula	1	FB	6	Caelys-Paul Putoko
Sunia Turuva	2	WG	2	Paul Ulberg
Semi Valemei	3	CE	3	KL Iro (c)
Michael Jennings	4	CE	4	Reubenn Rennie
Jethro Rinakama	5	WG	5	Esom Ioka
Kurt Donoghoe	6	FE	1	Esan Marsters
Brandon Wakeham	7	HB	7	Cassius Cowley
Tui Kamikamica (c)	8	PR	8	Makahesi Makatoa
Penioni Tagituimua	9	HK	9	Mason Teague
Michael Waqa	10	PF	10	Tepai Moeroa
Taane Milne	11	SR	11	Brendan Piakura
Kitione Kautoga	12	SR	12	Reuben Porter
Caleb Navale	13	LK	13	Pride Petterson-Robati
Terrell Kalo Kalo	14	IN	14	Rua Ngatikaura
Solomone Saukuru	15	IN	16	Brody Tamarua
Keresi Maya	16	IN	17	Rhys Dakin
Kylan Mafoa	17	IN	20	Justin Makirere
Ronald Phillitoga	18	CS	18	Delahia Wigmore
Wise Kativerata		Coach		Karmichael Hunt

25 October 2025
15:00 PNGST (UTC+10:00)

Papua New Guinea	40–28	Cook Islands
Tries: 7 Derby 12', 31'; Martin 26'; Johnston 35'; Laybutt 55'; Morea 66'; Voro 79'; Goals: 6 Martin 13', 27', 36', 56', 67' (5/6); Laybutt 80' (1/1); Sin bin: Martin (yellow card) 79' to 80'	1st: 22–12; 2nd: 18–16; Report	Tries: 5 Ngatikaura 4'; Rennie 19'; Putoko 51'; Ioka 60'; Wigmore 73'; Goals: 4 Ioka 6', 20', 62', 74' (4/5)

PNG Football Stadium, Port Moresby
Attendance: 14,864
Referee: Gerard Sutton

Team details
Papua New Guinea		Position	Cook Islands
Name	Number	Position	Number	Name
Morea Morea	1	FB	1	Esan Marsters
Robert Derby	2	WG	2	Paul Ulberg
Zac Laybutt	3	CE	3	KL Iro (c)
Nene MacDonald	4	CE	4	Reubenn Rennie
Alex Johnston	5	WG	5	Esom Ioka
Gairo Voro	6	SO/FE	6	Caelys-Paul Putoko
Lachlan Lam (c)	7	SH/HB	7	Cassius Cowley
Epel Kapinias	8	PR	8	Makahesi Makatoa
Edwin Ipape	9	HK	9	Mason Teague
Jack de Belin	10	PF	10	Tepai Moeroa
Rhyse Martin	11	SR	11	Brendan Piakura
Nixon Putt	12	SR	12	Reuben Porter
Liam Horne	13	LF/LK	13	Pride Petterson-Robati
Finley Glare	14	IN	14	Rua Ngatikaura
Jacob Alick-Wiencke	15	IN	17	Rhys Dakin
Cooper Bai	16	IN	18	Delahia Wigmore
Sylvester Namo	17	IN	20	Justin Makirere
Robert Mathias	18	CS	19	Teapo Stoltman
Jason Demetriou		Coach		Karmichael Hunt

1 November 2025
15:00 PNGST (UTC+10:00)

Papua New Guinea	50–18	Fiji
Tries: 8 Morea 10'; Ipape 10'; MacDonald 16'; Martin 20'; Bai 26'; Putt 50'; Dotoi 61'; Mathias 66'; Goals: 9 Martin 11', 15', 17', 21', 28', 52', 62', 67', pen 79' (9/9)	1st: 30-6; 2nd: 20-12; Report	Tries: 4 Kautoga 36', 46'; Saukuru 58'; Valemei 76'; Goals: 1 Wakeham 37' (1/4)

PNG Football Stadium, Port Moresby
Attendance: 12,046
Referee: Adam Gee

Team details
Papua New Guinea		Position	Fiji
Name	Number	Position	Number	Name
Morea Morea	1	FB	1	Jahream Bula
Dudley Dotoi	2	WG	2	Sunia Turuva
Zac Laybutt	3	CE	3	Jope Rauqe
Nene MacDonald	4	CE	4	Semi Valemei
Alex Johnston	5	WG	5	Ronald Phillitoga
Gairo Voro	6	FE	6	Kurt Donoghoe
Finley Glare	7	HB	7	Brandon Wakeham
Epel Kapinias	8	PR	8	Tui Kamikamica (c)
Edwin Ipape	9	HK	9	Penioni Tagituimua
Valentine Richard	10	PF	17	Kylan Mafoa
Rhyse Martin (c)	11	SR	11	Taane Milne
Nixon Putt	12	SR	12	Kitione Kautoga
Jack de Belin	13	LK	13	Caleb Navale
Lachlan Lam (c)	7	IN	14	Terrell Kalo Kalo
Robert Mathias	15	IN	15	Solomone Saukuru
Cooper Bai	16	IN	16	Ben Nakubuwai
Sylvester Namo	17	IN	19	Keresi Maya
Liam Horne	18	CS	18	Akuila Qoro
Jason Demetriou		Coach		Wise Kativerata

== Women's Pacific Cup ==
Pos	Team	Pld	W	D	L	PF	PA	PD	Pts	Qualification
1	Australia	2	2	0	0	70	4	+66	4	Advance to final
2	New Zealand	2	1	0	1	26	30	−4	2	Advance to final
3	Samoa	2	0	0	2	20	82	−62	0	

Updated to match(es) played on 19 October 2025. Source: NRL

=== Fixtures ===
==== Group stage ====
19 October 2025
15:35 NZDT (UTC+13:00)

New Zealand	22–20	Samoa
Tries: 4 Parker 44'; Quinlan 48'; Tauaneai 50'; Hufanga 64'; Goals: 3 Maliepo 49', 51', 64' (3/4)	1st: 0–20; 2nd: 22–0; Report	Tries: 4 Sauaso 13'; Masaga 21'; Mino-Sinapati 27'; Papali'i 32'; Goals: 2 Piliae-Rasabale 14', 33' (2/4)

Mount Smart Stadium, Auckland
Attendance: 12,571
Referee: Belinda Sharpe
Touch judges: Phil Henderson, Paki Parkinson
Player of the Match: Shalom Sauaso (Samoa)

Team details
New Zealand		Position	Samoa
Name	Number	Position	Number	Name
Apii Nicholls	1	FB	1	Jetaya Faifua
Shanice Parker	2	WG	2	Jessica Patea
Abigail Roache	3	CE	3	Sarina Masaga
Mele Hufanga	4	CE	4	Lindsay Tui
Tysha Ikenasio	5	WG	5	Destiny Mino-Sinapati
Patricia Maliepo	6	FE	6	Taliah Fuimaono
Raecene McGregor (c)	7	HB	7	Pauline Piliae-Rasabale
Angelina Teakaaranga-Katoa	8	PR	8	Annetta Nu'uausala (c)
Brooke Anderson	9	HK	9	Destiny Brill
Brianna Clark	10	PF	10	Eliza Lopamaua
Annessa Biddle	11	SR	11	Ryvrr Lee-Alo
Shakira Baker	12	SR	12	Tavarna Papalii
Georgia Hale (c)	13	LK	13	Sienna Lofipo
Ashleigh Quinlan	14	IN	14	Pihuka Berryman-Duff
Otesa Pule	15	IN	15	Laikha Clarke
Alexis Tauaneai	16	IN	16	Ella-Jaye Harrison-Leaunoa
Ivana Lauitiiti	17	IN	17	Shalom Sauaso
Tiana Davison	18	CS	18	Simone Karpani
Ricky Henry		Coach		Jamie Soward

26 October 2025
13:00 AEST (UTC+10:00)

Australia	60–0	Samoa
Tries: 11; Sergis 6', 8'; Upton 19', 62'; Kernick 22'; Robinson 31', 50'; Dodd 38'; Clydsdale 41'; Whitfeld 60'; Apps 67'; Goals: 8 Southwell 9', 21', 23', 40', 42', 52', 64', 68' (8/11)	1st: 26–0; 2nd: 34–0; Report	Sin bin: Mino-Sinapati (yellow card) 13' to 23'

Lang Park, Brisbane
Attendance: 30,842
Referee: Kasey Badger
Player of the Match: Tamika Upton (Australia)

Team details
Australia		Position	Samoa
Name	Number	Position	Number	Name
Tamika Upton	1	FB	1	Destiny Mino-Sinapati
Julia Robinson	2	WG	2	Jessica Patea
Isabelle Kelly	3	CE	3	Lindsay Tui
Tiana Penitani	4	CE	4	Sarina Masaga
Jessica Sergis	5	WG	5	Mercedez Taulelei-Siala
Ali Brigginshaw (c)	6	FE	6	Taliah Fuimaono
Jesse Southwell	7	HB	7	Jetaya Faifua
Rima Butler	8	PR	8	Annetta Nu'uausala (c)
Keeley Davis	9	HK	9	Destiny Brill
Jessika Elliston	10	PF	10	Eliza Lopamaua
Kezie Apps (c)	11	SR	11	Tavarna Papalii
Yasmin Clydsdale	12	SR	12	Ryvrr-Lee Alo
Olivia Kernick	13	LK	17	Shalom Sauaso
Quincy Dodd	14	IN	13	Pihuka Berryman-Duff
Keilee Joseph	15	IN	14	Ella-Jaye Harrison-Leaunoa
Ellie Johnston	16	IN	15	Laikha Clarke
Jakiya Whitfeld	17	IN	16	Jaydika Tafua
Sarah Togatuki	18	CS	18	Simone Karpani
Jess Skinner		Coach		Jamie Soward

2 November 2025
15:35 NZDT (UTC+13:00)

New Zealand	4–10	Australia
Tries: 1 Biddle 50'; Goals: 0 McGregor (0/1)	1st: 0-6; 2nd: 4-4; Report	Tries: 2 Sergis 31'; Church 42'; Goals: 1 Southwell 32' (1/2)

Eden Park, Auckland
Attendance: 19,154
Referee: Belinda Sharpe
Player of the Match: Abbi Church (Australia)

Team details
New Zealand		Position	Australia
Name	Number	Position	Number	Name
Apii Nicholls	1	FB	19	Abbi Church
Shanice Parker	2	WG	2	Julia Robinson
Abigail Roache	3	CE	3	Isabelle Kelly
Mele Hufanga	4	CE	4	Tiana Penitani
Leianne Tufuga	5	WG	5	Jessica Sergis
Patricia Maliepo	6	FE	6	Ali Brigginshaw (c)
Raecene McGregor (c)	7	HB	7	Jesse Southwell
Angelina Teakaaranga-Katoa	8	PR	8	Ellie Johnston
Brooke Anderson	9	HK	9	Keeley Davis
Tiana Davison	10	PF	10	Jessika Elliston
Annessa Biddle	11	SR	11	Kezie Apps (c)
Otesa Pule	12	SR	12	Yasmin Clydsdale
Georgia Hale (c)	13	LK	13	Olivia Kernick
Ashleigh Quinlan	14	IN	14	Quincy Dodd
Shaniece Monschau	15	IN	15	Keilee Joseph
Alexis Tauaneai	16	IN	16	Rima Butler
Ivana Lauitiiti	17	IN	17	Sarah Togatuki
Tyla King	18	CS	18	Jakiya Whitfeld
Ricky Henry		Coach		Jess Skinner

==== Women's final ====
9 November 2025
13:30 AEDT (UTC+11:00)

Australia	40–8	New Zealand
Tries: 7 Robinson 13', 70'; Kernick 3'; Joseph 25'; Sergis 32'; Upton 49'; Johnston 63'; Goals: 6 Southwell 5', 15', 26', 34', 50', 65' (6/7)	1st: 24–0; 2nd: 16–8; Report	Tries: 2 Parker 41'; Ikenasio 52'; Goals: 0 Nicholls (0/2); Sin bin: Quinlan (yellow card) 25' to 35'; Lauitiiti (yellow card) 60' to 70'

Western Sydney Stadium, Sydney
Attendance: 17,702
Referee: Belinda Sharpe
Video referee: Adam Gee
Touch judges: Phil Henderson, Ziggy Przeklasa-Adamski
Player of the Match: Julia Robinson (Australia)

Team details
Australia		Position	New Zealand
Name	Number	Position	Number	Name
Tamika Upton	1	FB	1	Apii Nicholls
Julia Robinson	2	WG	2	Tysha Ikenasio
Isabelle Kelly	3	CE	3	Abigail Roache
Tiana Penitani	4	CE	4	Mele Hufanga
Jakiya Whitfeld	5	WG	5	Shanice Parker
Ali Brigginshaw (c)	6	FE	6	Ashleigh Quinlan
Jesse Southwell	7	HB	7	Raecene McGregor (c)
Ellie Johnston	8	PR	8	Tiana Davison
Olivia Higgins	9	HK	9	Brooke Anderson
Jessika Elliston	10	PF	10	Angelina Teakaaranga-Katoa
Kezie Apps (c)	11	SR	11	Annessa Biddle
Yasmin Clydsdale	12	SR	12	Otesa Pule
Olivia Kernick	13	LK	13	Georgia Hale (c)
Quincy Dodd	14	IN	14	Tyla King
Keilee Joseph	15	IN	15	Shaniece Monschau
Jessica Sergis	16	IN	16	Alexis Tauaneai
Rima Butler	17	IN	17	Ivana Lauitiiti
Sarah Togatuki (not used)	18	CS	18	Shakira Baker (not used)
Jess Skinner		Coach		Ricky Henry

== Women's Pacific Bowl ==
Pos	Team	Pld	W	D	L	PF	PA	PD	Pts	Qualification
1	Cook Islands	2	2	0	0	76	30	+46	4	Winner
2	Tonga	2	1	0	1	66	48	+18	2	
3	Papua New Guinea	2	0	0	2	14	78	−64	0	

Updated to match(es) played on 18 October 2025. Source: NRL

=== Fixtures ===
The announced schedule for the Women's Pacific Bowl does not include a final or play-off/relegation match.

18 October 2025
13:00 PNGST (UTC+10:00)

Papua New Guinea	6–34	Cook Islands
Tries: 1 Veivers 7'; Goals: 1 Veivers 8' (1/1)	1st: 6–20; 2nd: 0–14; Report	Tries: 7 Morris-Ponga 11', 21', 65'; Kiria-Ratu 13'; Makira 33'; Paitai 42'; Matua 59'; Goals: Kiria-Ratu 12', 15', 60' (3/7)

PNG Football Stadium, Port Moresby
Referee: Todd Smith

Team details
Papua New Guinea		Position	Cook Islands
Name	Number	Position	Number	Name
Fleur Ginn	1	FB	1	Kiana Takairangi (c)
Ruth Gende	20	WG	2	Paulina Morris-Ponga
Tia Molo	3	CE	3	Kiarah Siauane
Marie Biyama	4	CE	4	Deleni Paitai
Naomi Kelly	5	WG	5	Hannah Makira
India Seeto	6	FE	6	Lydia Turua-Quedley
Caitlin Tanner	7	HB	7	Charntay Kiria-Ratu
Elsie Albert (c)	8	PR	8	Lavinia Kitai
Emily Veivers	14	HK	9	Pearl Tuitama
Jessikah Reeves	13	PF	15	Ashlee Matapo
Sareka Mooka	11	SR	11	Anne-Marie Kiria-Ratu
Leila Kerowa	12	SR	19	Kaiyah Atai
Gloria Kaupa	16	LK	13	Jazmon Tupou-Witchman
Therese Aiton	9	IN	10	April Ngatapuna
Emmogen Taumafai	10	IN	14	Kerehitina Matua
Essay Banu	15	IN	16	Ngatokotoru Arakua
Belinda Gwasamun	19	IN	17	Memory Paitai
Mya Muller	17	CS	18	Porche John
Tahnee Norris		Coach		Ron Griffiths

25 October 2025
13:00 PNGST (UTC+10:00)

Cook Islands	42–24	Tonga
Tries: 8 Matua 49', 63'; Siauane 58', 69'; Paitai 19'; Tupou-Witchman 29'; Morris-Ponga 34'; Arakua 35'; Goals: 5 Kiria-Ratu 21', 31', 37', 51', 69' (5/8)	1st: 16–10; 2nd: 26–14; Report	Tries: 5 Paki 6'; Lokotui 9'; Mailangi 39'; Courtenay 42'; Muru 53'; Goals: 2 Paki 8', 40' (2/5)

PNG Football Stadium, Port Moresby
Referee: Ziggy Przeklasa-Adamski

Team details
Cook Islands		Position	Tonga
Name	Number	Position	Number	Name
Kiana Takairangi (c)	1	FB	1	Ana Malupo
Kiarah Siauane	2	WG	2	Moana Courtenay
Keira Rangi	3	CE	3	Fane Finau
Deleni Paitai	4	CE	4	Martha Mataele
Paulina Morris-Ponga	5	WG	5	Simina Lokotui
Lydia Turua-Quedley	6	FE	6	Malia Tuifua
Chantay Kiria-Ratu	7	HB	7	Emmanita Paki
Lavinia Kitai	8	PR	8	Natasha Penitani (c)
Pearl Tuitama	9	HK	9	Seli Mailangi
Ashlee Matapo	10	PF	10	Kalosipani Hopoate
Anne-Marie Kiria-Ratu	11	SR	11	Shannon Muru
Kaiyah Atai	19	SR	12	Manilita Takapautolo
Jazmon Tupou-Witchman	13	LK	13	Amelia Huakau
Kerehitina Matua	14	IN	14	Kaylani Tavita
Porche John	15	IN	15	Jade Fonua
Ngatoktoru Arakua	16	IN	16	Tatiana Finau
Jodeci Joseph	17	IN	17	Ruby Fifita
Memory Paitai	18	CS	18	Pauline Suli-Ruka
Ron Griffiths		Coach		Meg Ward

1 November 2025
13:00 PNGST (UTC+10:00)

Papua New Guinea	6–42	Tonga
Tries: 1 Kelly 16'; Goals: 1 Veivers 18'	1st: 6-18; 2nd: 0-24; Report	Tries: 9 Mataele 32', 61', 69'; Courtenay 2'; Fifita 7'; Hopoate 22'; Tuifua 37'; Fonua 41'; Lokotui 53'; Goals: 3 Paki 8', 39', 43' (3/9)

PNG Football Stadium, Port Moresby

Team details
Papua New Guinea		Position	Tonga
Name	Number	Position	Number	Name
Fleur Ginn	1	FB	1	Ana Malupo
Ruth Gende	2	WG	2	Moana Courtenay
Tia Molo	3	CE	3	Fane Finau
Relna Wuruki-Hosea	4	CE	4	Martha Mataele
Naomi Kelly	5	WG	5	Simina Lokotui
India Seeto	6	FE	6	Malia Tuifua
Caitlin Tanner	7	HB	7	Emmanita Paki
Elsie Albert (c)	8	PR	8	Natasha Penitani (c)
Emily Veivers	9	HK	9	Seli Mailangi
Gloria Kaupa	10	PF	17	Ruby Fifita
Sareka Mooka	11	SR	11	Shannon Muru
Marie Biyama	16	SR	16	Tatiana Finau
Jessikah Reeves	13	LK	13	Amelia Huakau
Mya Muller	12	IN	10	Kalosipani Hopoate
Therese Aiton	14	IN	15	Jade Fonua
Emmogen Taumafai	15	IN	18	Pauline Suli-Ruka
Belinda Gwasamun	17	IN	20	Paea Uilou
Mala Mark	18	CS	21	Vanessa Foliaki
Tahnee Norris		Coach		Meg Ward

== Men's World Cup qualification: Southern Hemisphere playoff ==
9 November 2025
11:25 AEDT (UTC+11:00)

Cook Islands	58–6	South Africa
Tries: 11; Niukore 39', 66'; Cowley 57', 77'; Ulberg 9'; Moale 23'; Marsters 36'; Iro 51'; Piakura 56'; Teague 74'; Ngatikaura 80'; Goals: 7 Marsters 24', 40', 55' (3/6); Ioka 63', 76', 78' (3/4); Iro 80' (1/1)	1st: 20–6; 2nd: 38–0; Report	Tries: 1 De Vlieg 18'; Goals: 1 Beukes 19' (1/1); Sin bin: Perry (yellow card) 30' to 40'

Western Sydney Stadium, Sydney
Attendance: 3,245
Referee: Wyatt Raymond (Australia)

Team details
Cook Islands		Position	South Africa
Name	Number	Position	Number	Name
Esom Ioka	1	FB	1	Luke De Vlieg
Paul Ulberg	2	WG	2	Niel Beukes
KL Iro (c)	3	CE	3	Callum McMenemy
Reubenn Rennie	4	CE	4	Brynn Du Rand
Teapo Stoltman	5	WG	5	Brady McMillan
Cassius Cowley	6	SO	6	Coby Thomas
Esan Marsters	7	SH	7	Kamren Cryer (c)
Makahesi Makatoa	8	PR	8	Shane Mackenzie
Mason Teague	9	HK	9	Kobe Martin
Davvy Moale	10	PF	10	Jason Smith
Brendan Piakura	11	SR	11	Ethan Sweet
Marata Niukore (c)	12	SR	12	Keegan Turner
Pride Petterson-Robati	13	LF	13	Aden Perry
Rua Ngatikaura	14	IN	14	Reilly Canning
Reuben Porter	15	IN	15	Joshua Hill
Justin Makirere	16	IN	16	Ashley Bull
Rhys Dakin	17	IN	17	Marcelle Corneelsen
Amare Milford (not used)	20	CS	18	Kalum Gulliver-Brown (not used)
Karmichael Hunt		Coach		Darryl Fisher

== Broadcasting ==
Region	Broadcaster	Ref.
Australia	Nine Network	
Australia	Fox League	
New Zealand	Sky Sport	
United Kingdom	Sky Sports Mix	
United States	Fox Soccer Plus	
