= Rua Ngatikaura =

Cook Islands international rugby league footballer

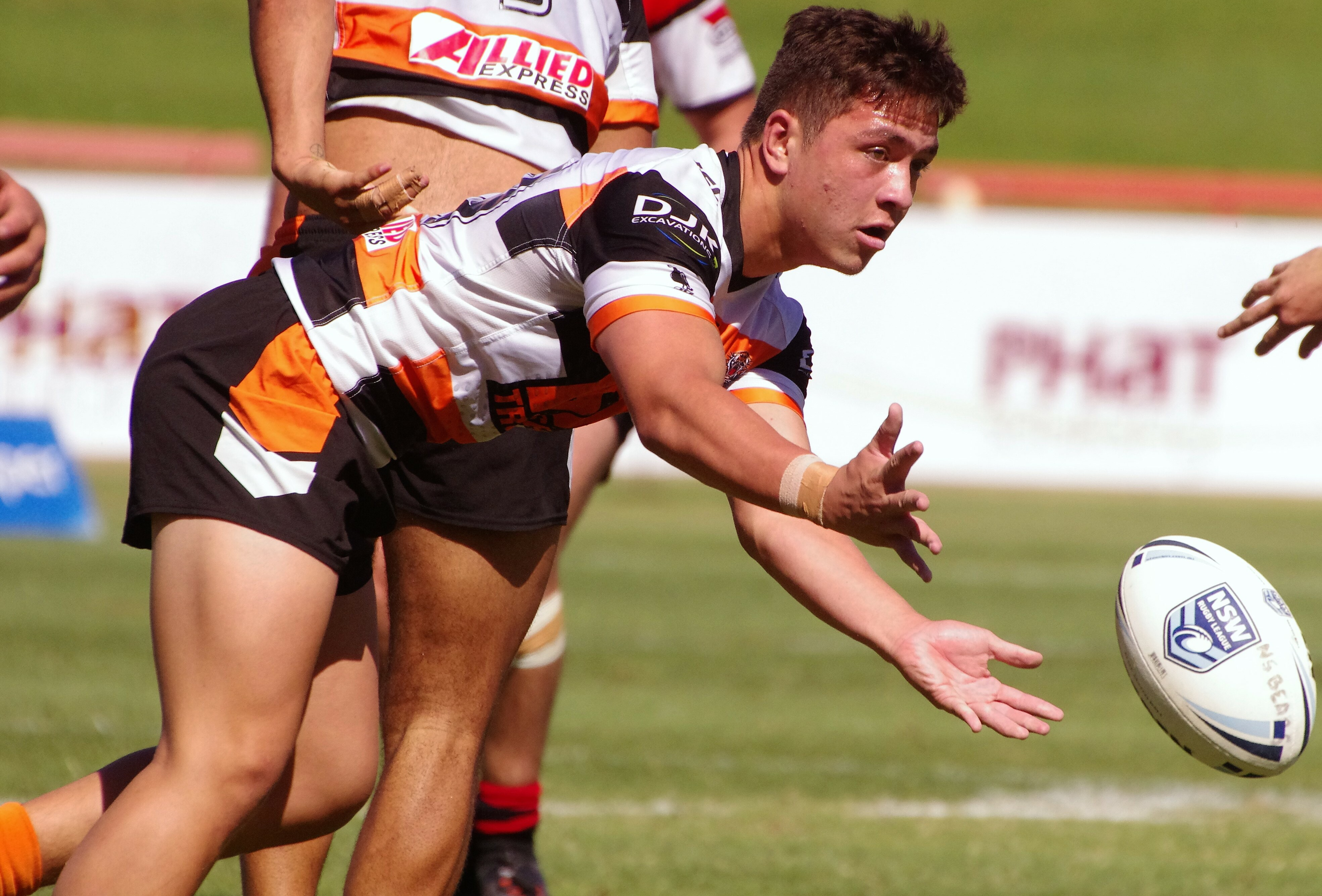

Personal information
- Full name: Ruatapu Ngatikaura
- Born: 27 May 2000 (age 26) Campbelltown, New South Wales, Australia
- Height: 177 cm (5 ft 10 in)
- Weight: 96 kg (15 st 2 lb)

Playing information
- Position: Hooker, Lock
Representative
Years	Team	Pld	T	G	FG	P
2022–	Cook Islands	12	4	0	0	16
- Source: As of 31 October 2026

Ruatapu Ngatikaura (born 27 May 2000) is a Cook Islands international rugby league footballer who plays as a hooker for the North Sydney Bears in the NSW Cup.

== Background ==
Ngatikaura was born in Campbelltown, New South Wales. He is of Cook Islands descent.

== Playing career ==
=== Club career ===
Ngatikaura came through the youth system at the Wests Tigers, playing for the Western Suburbs in the Harold Matthews Cup between 2015 and 2016, before moving onto the S. G. Ball Cup side in 2017. He played for the Wests Tigers in their Jersey Flegg Cup side between 2018 and 2021. He captained the side and was named player of the year in 2021.

He played for the Wests Tigers in Trial matches before the start of the 2022 NRL season.

Ngatikaura was promoted to the Wests Tigers top squad ahead of the 2023 NRL season. At the end of the 2023 NRL season, Ngatikaura was released by the club. In November 2023, he joined NSW Cup side North Sydney ahead of the 2024 NSW Cup season.

=== International career ===
In 2022 Ngatikaura was named in the Cook Islands squad for the 2021 Rugby League World Cup.

He scored a try in the 40-28 defeat to Papua New Guinea on 25 October 2025 in the 2025 Pacific Championships
