= Simi Sasagi =

Samoa international rugby league footballer

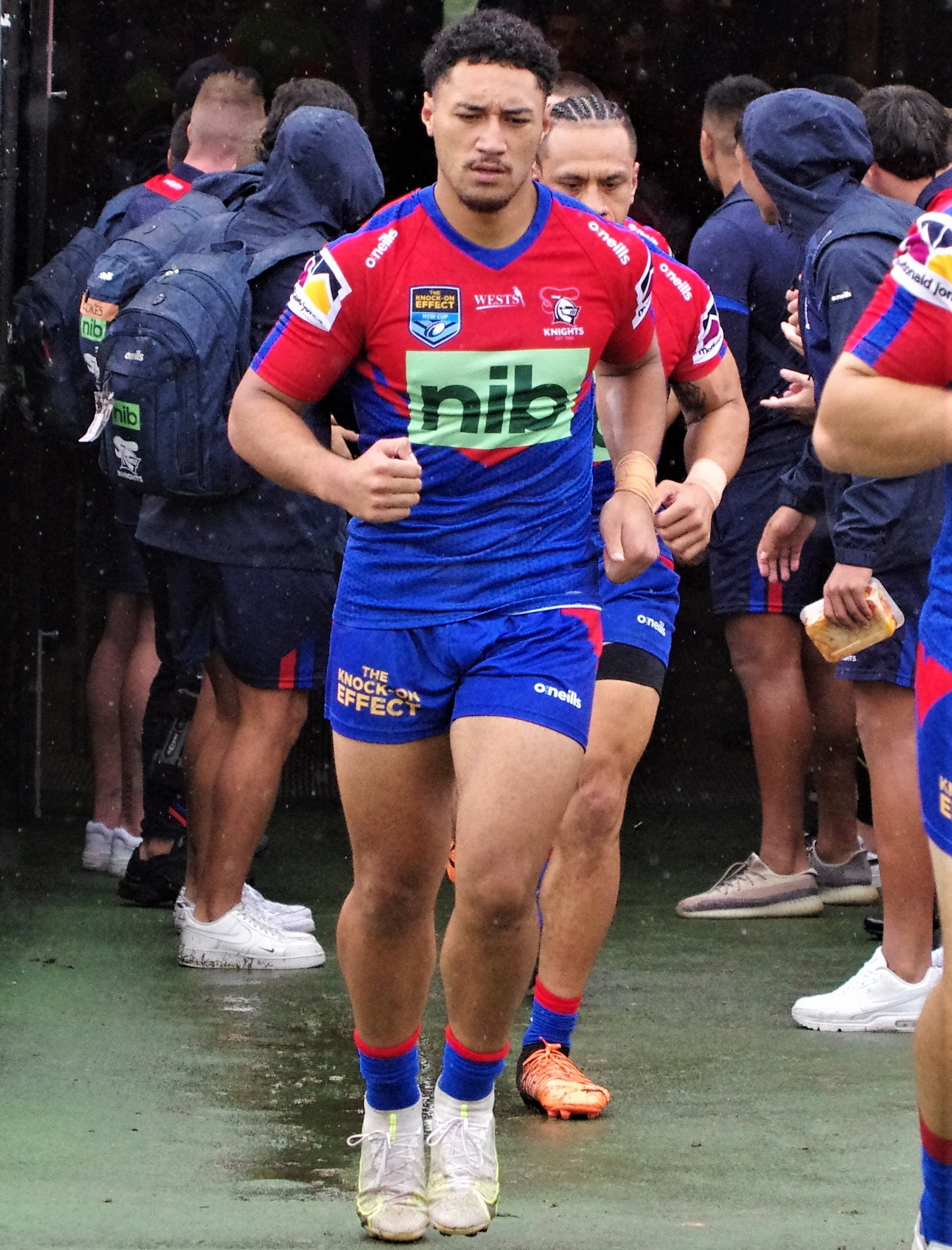

Personal information
- Full name: Nathanael Sasagi
- Born: 24 April 2001 (age 25) Auckland, New Zealand
- Height: 184 cm (6 ft 0 in)
- Weight: 102 kg (16 st 1 lb)

Playing information
- Position: Centre, Second-row
Club
Years	Team	Pld	T	G	FG	P
2021–23	Newcastle Knights	17	0	0	0	0
2024–	Canberra Raiders	48	16	0	0	64
	Total	65	16	0	0	64
Representative
Years	Team	Pld	T	G	FG	P
2024–25	Samoa	4	2	0	0	8
- Source: As of 6 November 2026

Nathanael "Simi" Sasagi (born 24 April 2001) is a Samoa international rugby league footballer who plays as a second-row forward for the Canberra Raiders in the National Rugby League.

He previously played for the Newcastle Knights as a centre.

== Background ==
Sasagi was born in Auckland, New Zealand. He is of Samoan descent.

He played his junior rugby league for the Ellerslie Eagles, before being signed by the Newcastle Knights.

== Playing career ==
=== Early years ===
Sasagi started his career at the Knights playing with their S. G. Ball Cup team in 2018, before re-signing with the club on a contract until the end of 2020, with an option for a further two seasons after that. In 2019 and 2020, he trained with the first-grade squad as a development player, but only played two games for the Knights' Jersey Flegg Cup side in that time after being hampered by injury. He was named in the Junior Kiwis squad in September 2019.

=== 2021 ===
In 2021, Sasagi was promoted to the top 30 squad and spent his time playing with the NSW Cup side. He made his NRL debut for Newcastle against North Queensland in round 11 of the 2021 NRL season, playing in the centres as Newcastle were defeated 20–36.

=== 2022 ===
Sasagi played 14 games for Newcastle in the 2022 NRL season which saw the club missing the finals finishing 14th on the table.

=== 2023 ===
In August, Sasagi signed a two-year contract with the Canberra Raiders starting in 2024, after gaining a release from the remainder of his Newcastle contract.

=== 2024 ===
Sasagi played ten matches for Canberra in the 2024 NRL season as the club finished 9th on the table.

=== 2025 ===
On 13 March, Sasagi signed a one-year extension with Canberra. On 20 August, Canberra announced that Sasagi had penned another extension with the club until the end of 2028. Sasagi played 22 matches for Canberra in the 2025 NRL season as the club claimed the Minor Premiership. He played in both finals matches as Canberra went out in straight sets losing to both Brisbane and Cronulla.

He scored a try for Samoa in the 2025 Pacific Championships 24–18 defeat to New Zealand in Auckland.

=== 2026 ===
Sasagi played 16 games for Canberra in the 2026 NRL season as the club finished 11th on the table and missed the finals.

== Statistics ==
Year	Team	Games	Tries	Pts
2021	Newcastle Knights	3		
2022	Newcastle Knights	14		
2024	Canberra Raiders	10	2	8
2025	Canberra Raiders	22	7	28
2026	Canberra Raiders	14	7	28
	Totals	63	16	64
