= Reuben Porter =

Cook Islands international rugby league footballer

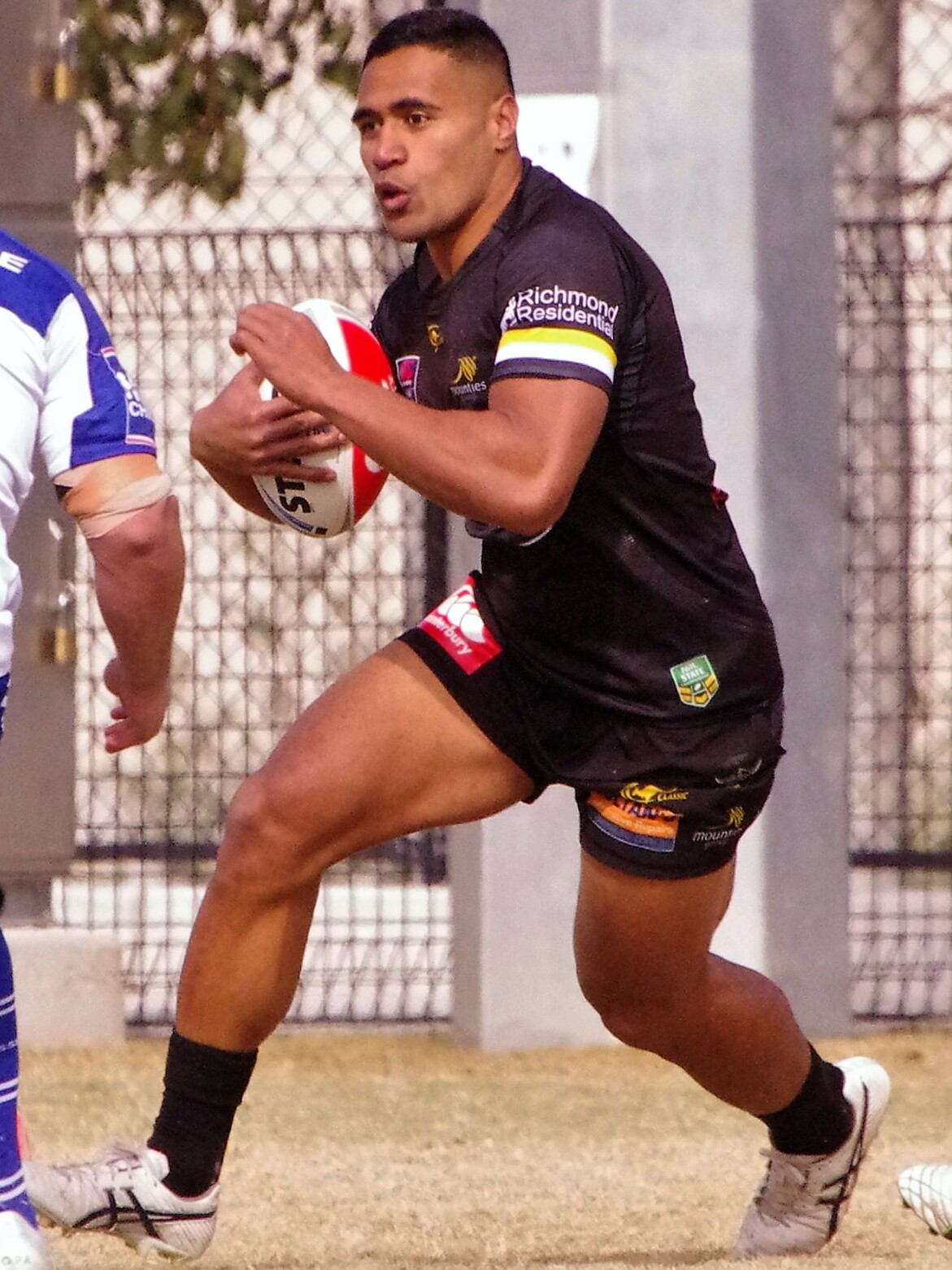

Personal information
- Full name: Reuben Porter
- Born: 26 March 1997 (age 29) Wellington, New Zealand
- Height: 1.89 m (6 ft 2 in)
- Weight: 102 kg (16 st 1 lb)

Playing information
- Position: Second-row, Lock
Club
Years	Team	Pld	T	G	FG	P
2024	Wests Tigers	8	0	0	0	0
Representative
Years	Team	Pld	T	G	FG	P
2017–	Cook Islands	11	0	0	0	0
- Source: As of 18 October 2026

Reuben Porter (born 26 March 1997) is a Cook Islands international rugby league footballer who last played as a second-row forward for the Wests Tigers in the NRL

== Background ==
Porter was born in Wellington, New Zealand. He is of Cook Islands descent.

== Playing career ==
=== Club career ===
Porter was a junior at the Te Atatu Roosters playing throughout the grades up until U17s in 2014. He then moved to Australia and joined the youth system at the Sydney Roosters. He played for the Wyong Roos in 2018. Porter played for the Mount Pritchard Mounties between 2019 and 2020. He joined the Tweed Seagulls ahead of the 2022 Queensland Cup season. In 2023, Porter joined NSW Cup side North Sydney., and played for them in their NSW Cup grand final loss against South Sydney.

On 21 November 2023, it was announced by the Wests Tigers that they had offered Porter a train and trial deal ahead of the 2024 NRL season. In round 14 of the 2024 NRL season, Porter made his first grade debut for the Wests Tigers against St. George Illawarra at WIN Stadium which ended in a 56-14 loss. Porter re-signed with the Tigers until the end of the 2025 season, but played no further first-grade for the club.

=== International career ===
Porter made his international debut for the Cook Islands in May 2017 against Papua New Guinea.

In 2022 he was named in the Cook Islands squad for the 2021 Rugby League World Cup.
