= Reubenn Rennie =

Cook Islands international rugby league footballer

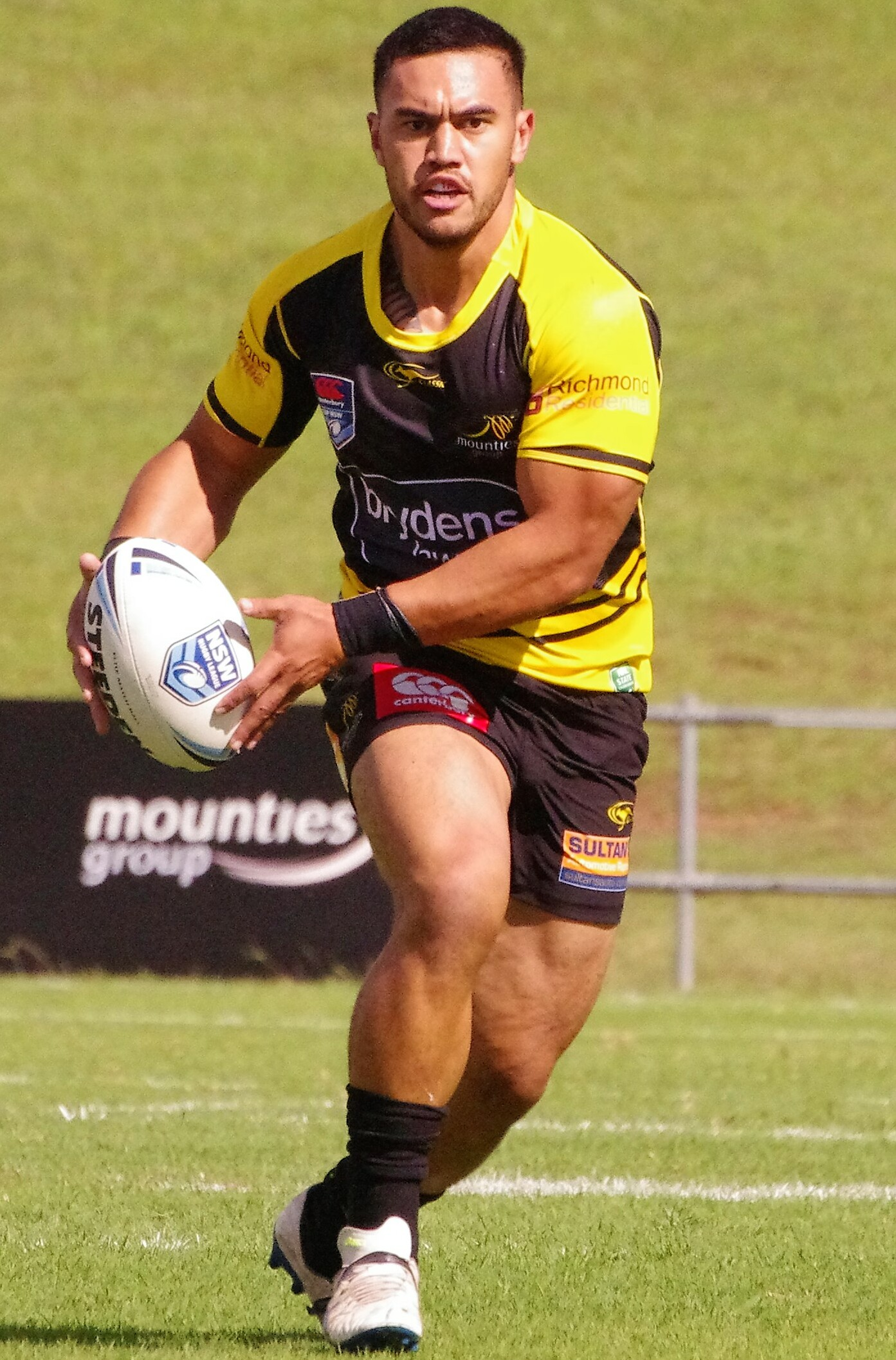

Personal information
- Full name: Reubenn Rennie
- Born: 22 October 1995 (age 31) Auckland, New Zealand
- Height: 5 ft 11 in (1.80 m)
- Weight: 15 st 4 lb (97 kg)

Playing information
- Position: Centre, Second-row
Club
Years	Team	Pld	T	G	FG	P
2023–26	Toulouse Olympique	67	32	0	0	128
Representative
Years	Team	Pld	T	G	FG	P
2016–	Cook Islands	15	5	0	0	20
2018	New Zealand Māori	1	0	0	0	0
- Source: As of 31 October 2026
- Relatives: Vincent Rennie (brother)

Reubenn Rennie (born 22 October 1995) is a Cook Islands international rugby league footballer who last played as a centre for the Toulouse Olympique in the Super League.

== Background ==
Rennie was born in Auckland, New Zealand. He is of Cook Islands descent. His brother Vincent Rennie is a fellow Cook Islands international.

== Playing career ==
=== Club career ===
Rennie played for the Melbourne Storm-Cronulla-Sutherland Sharks joint team in 2014.

Rennie played for the Canterbury-Bankstown Bulldogs in 2015 and 2016.

Rennie played for the Newtown club in 2017 and 2018.

Rennie played for the Mount Pritchard Mounties between 2019 and 2021.

Rennie re-joined the Newtown side ahead of the 2022 NSW Cup season.

On 6 August 2026 it was reported that he had left Toulouse Olympique with immediate effect

=== International career ===
Rennie made his senior international debut for the Cook Islands June 2016 against Lebanon. In 2022 he was named in the Cook Islands squad for the 2021 Rugby League World Cup.

In the second group stage match against Papua New Guinea, Rennie was sent to the sin bin for a dangerous lifting tackle during the Cook Islands 32–16 loss.
