= Makahesi Makatoa =

Cook Islands international rugby league footballer

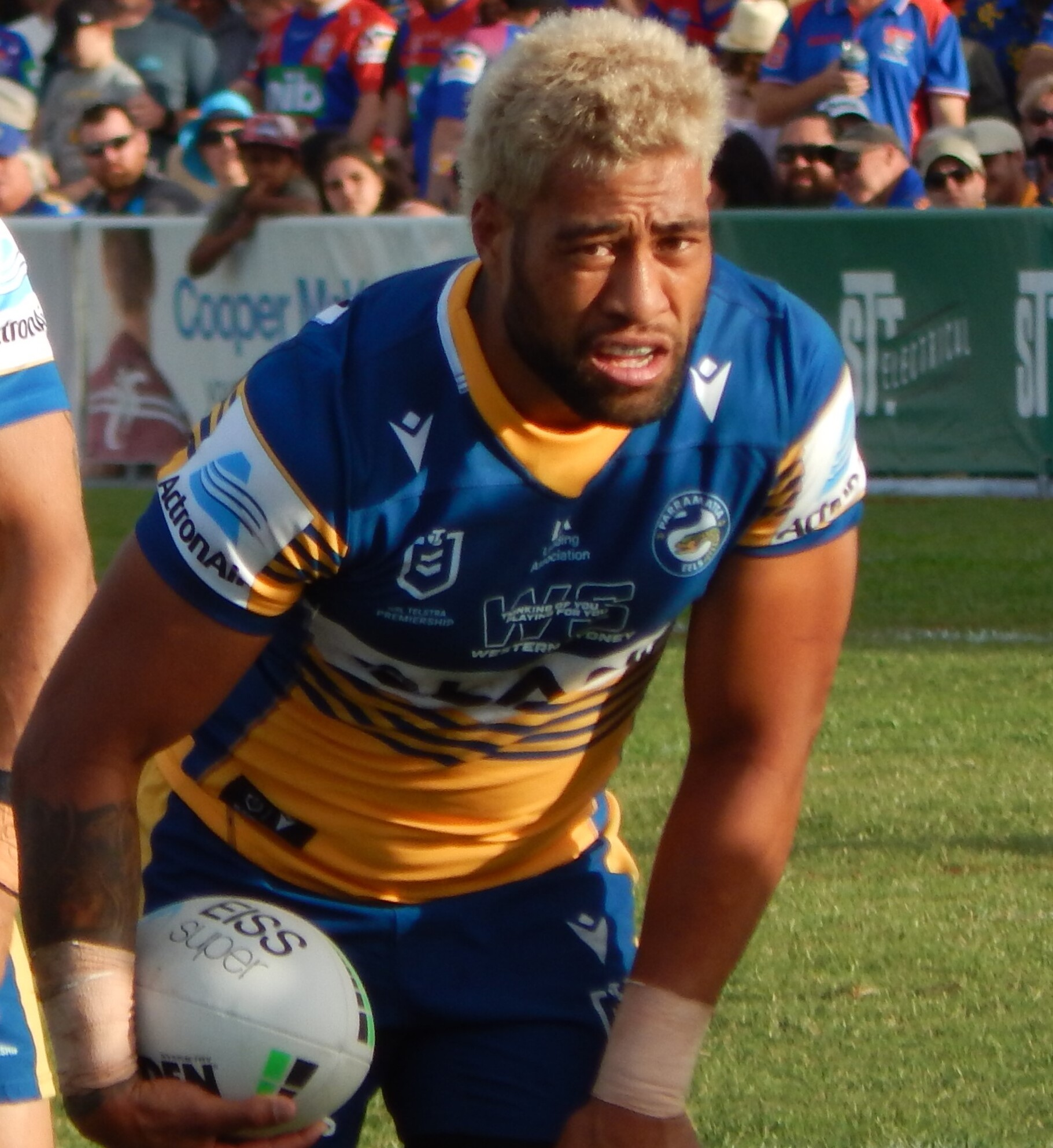

Personal information
- Full name: Makahesi Makatoa
- Born: 30 January 1993 (age 33) New Plymouth, New Zealand
- Height: 186 cm (6 ft 1 in)
- Weight: 104 kg (16 st 5 lb)

Playing information
- Position: Prop, Lock
Club
Years	Team	Pld	T	G	FG	P
2019	Featherstone Rovers	25	4	0	0	16
2021–24	Parramatta Eels	56	1	0	0	4
2025–	Sydney Roosters	5	0	0	0	0
	Total	86	5	0	0	20
Representative
Years	Team	Pld	T	G	FG	P
2015–	Cook Islands	14	1	0	0	4
- Source: As of 6 November 2026

Makahesi Makatoa (born 30 January 1993) is a Cook Islands international rugby league footballer who plays as a prop or lock forward for the Sydney Roosters in the National Rugby League (NRL).

He previously played for Featherstone Rovers in the RFL Championship.

== Background ==
Makatoa was born in New Plymouth, New Zealand, of Niuean and Cook Islander descent. He played junior rugby league for the Marist Dragons in his hometown.

== Playing career ==
=== Early career ===
Makatoa played 5 matches for the Canterbury-Bankstown Bulldogs in the NRL Under-20s in 2013.

Makatoa played for the Mount Pritchard Mounties in the New South Wales Cup in 2017 and 2018.

=== Featherstone Rovers ===
Makatoa signed with Featherstone Rovers in the RFL Championship in 2019, following head coach Ryan Carr from Mounties to the Rovers.

=== Parramatta Eels ===
Makatoa joined the Parramatta Eels' New South Wales Cup squad in 2020, again under coach Carr. In Round 22 2021, Makatoa made his NRL debut for Parramatta against the Manly-Warringah Sea Eagles at Sunshine Coast Stadium, which ended in a 56-10 defeat. In December 2021, he signed a new deal to remain at Parramatta until the end of the 2023 season. Makatoa played 23 games for Parramatta in the 2022 NRL season including two finals matches. Makatoa was left out of Parramatta's preliminary final team which defeated North Queensland to reach the 2022 NRL Grand Final. Makatoa was not included in Parramatta's grand final team which lost 28-12 against Penrith. In round 16 of the 2023 NRL season, Makatoa scored his first try for Parramatta in their 34-4 victory over Manly. Makatoa played a total of 17 matches for Parramatta which were all from the interchange bench in the 2023 NRL season as the club finished 10th and missed the finals. Makatoa made ten appearances for Parramatta in the 2024 NRL season as the club finished 15th on the table. Makatoa spent most of the year playing with the clubs NSW Cup team. On 11 September, it was announced that Makatoa would be departing the Parramatta club after not being offered a new contract.

=== 2025 ===
In the pre-season, Makatoa joined the Sydney Roosters and played in the Roosters pre-season challenge. In round 2 of the 2025 NRL season, he made his official club debut for the Sydney Roosters in their 38-32 upset victory over Penrith.
