= Naufahu Whyte =

NZ international rugby league player

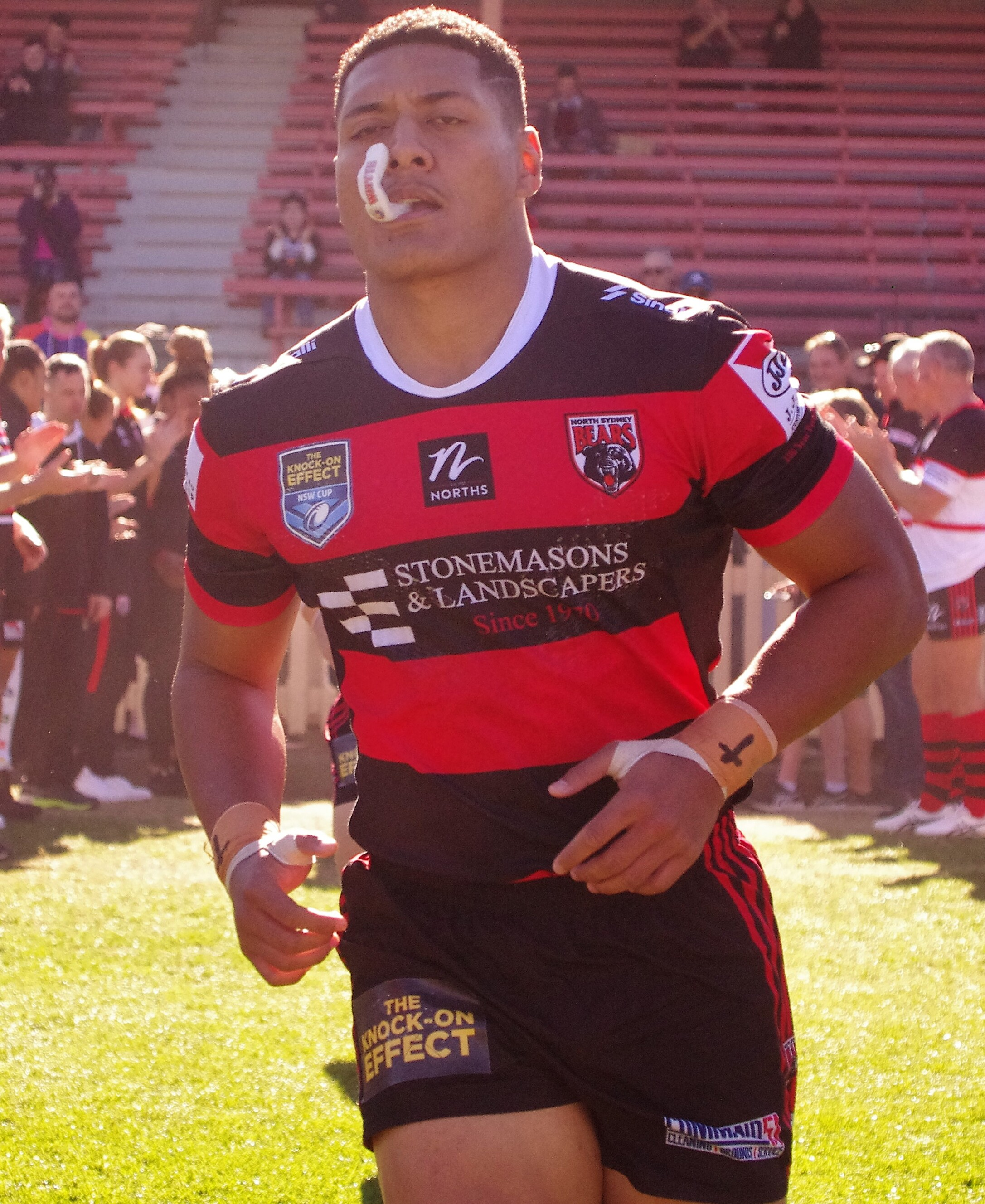

Personal information
- Full name: Naufahu Whyte
- Born: 4 April 2002 (age 24) Auckland, New Zealand
- Height: 192 cm (6 ft 4 in)
- Weight: 106 kg (16 st 10 lb)

Playing information
- Position: Prop, Lock
Club
Years	Team	Pld	T	G	FG	P
2021–	Sydney Roosters	84	4	0	0	16
Representative
Years	Team	Pld	T	G	FG	P
2024–	New Zealand	10	2	0	0	8
- Source: As of 15 November 2026

Naufahu Whyte (born 4 April 2002) is a New Zealand professional rugby league footballer who plays as a prop or lock forward for the Sydney Roosters in the National Rugby League (NRL) and for New Zealand at international level.

== Background ==
Whyte was born in Auckland, New Zealand and is of Samoan and Tongan descent.

== Playing career ==
In round 22 2021, Whyte made his NRL debut for the Sydney Roosters against the Brisbane Broncos at Suncorp Stadium in a 21–20 win. Whyte re-signed with the Roosters club until the end of 2024. Whyte played nine matches for the Sydney Roosters in the 2023 NRL season as the club finished 7th on the table and qualified for the finals.

=== 2024 ===
On 21 May 2024, the Sydney Roosters hit back at claims that Whyte had been taking illegal substances on a live stream along with fellow players Brandon Smith, Zach Dockar-Clay, Terrell May and Spencer Leniu. The club released a statement which read “The Sydney Roosters have been made aware of a small clip from a longer live stream that some on social media have claimed identifies behaviour that breaches NRL rules. “The clip reveals no use of illicit substances or any other breach of NRL rules, however some see fit to make that grossly distorted and clearly damaging claim". Whyte played 23 games for the Sydney Roosters in the 2024 NRL season as they finished third on the table. Whyte played in the clubs preliminary final loss against Melbourne.

=== 2025 ===
On 24 June, the Sydney Roosters announced that Whyte had re-signed with the club for a further three years. He played 23 games for the Sydney Roosters in the 2025 NRL season as the club finished 8th on the table and qualified for the finals.

=== 2026 ===
Whyte played 27 matches for the Sydney Roosters in the 2026 NRL season including the clubs 2026 NRL Grand Final victory over Newcastle.

== Statistics ==
Year	Team	Games	Tries	Pts
2021	Sydney Roosters	3		
2023	Sydney Roosters	8		
2024	Sydney Roosters	23	1	4
2025	Sydney Roosters	23	3	12
2026	Sydney Roosters	27		
2027	Sydney Roosters			
	Totals	84	4	16
