= Pride Petterson-Robati =

Cook Islands international rugby league footballer

Pride Petterson Robati
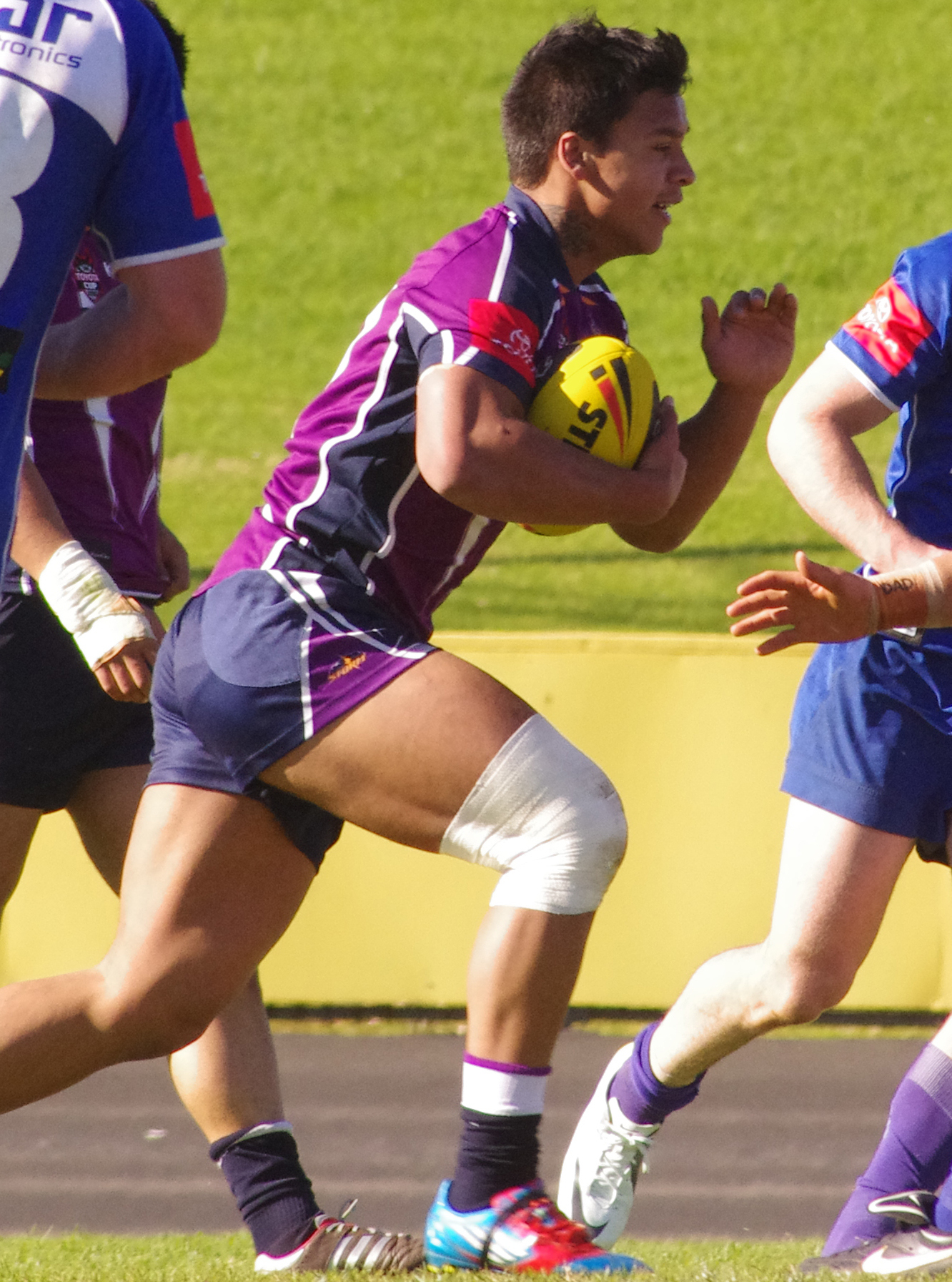

Personal information
- Full name: Pride Petterson-Robati
- Born: 16 June 1995 (age 31) Wellington, New Zealand
- Height: 1.88 m (6 ft 2 in)
- Weight: 102 kg (16 st 1 lb)

Playing information
- Position: Lock
Representative
Years	Team	Pld	T	G	FG	P
2019–	Cook Islands	12	1	0	0	4
- Source: As of 31 October 2026

Pride Petterson-Robati (born 16 June 1995) is a Cook Islands international rugby league footballer who plays as a lock, and was last contracted to the New Zealand Warriors in the National Rugby League (NRL).

== Background ==
Petterson-Robati was born in Lower Hutt, Wellington, New Zealand. He is of Cook Islands descent.

He attended Upper Hutt College.

He played for the Upper Hutt Tigers as a junior.

== Playing career ==
=== Club career ===
Petterson-Robati moved to Australia and progressed through the youth system at the Melbourne Storm, playing for the S. G. Ball Cup through to their under 20s side.

He joined the Newcastle Knights before leaving in 2015.

Petterson-Robati played for the Fortitude Valley Diehards in the Brisbane Rugby League premiership.

He played for the Norths Devils in the Queensland Cup between 2019 and 2020.

Petterson-Robati was promoted to the New Zealand Warriors top squad ahead of the 2021 NRL season.

He played for the Redcliffe Dolphins between 2021 and 2022 in the Queensland Cup.

Petterson-Robati left the Warriors at the conclusion of the 2022 NRL season.

=== International career ===
Petterson-Robati played for the Junior Kiwis in 2014.

In 2019 he made his international début for the Cook Islands against South Africa.

In 2022 Petterson-Robati was named in the Cook Islands squad for the 2021 Rugby League World Cup.
