= Terrell May =

Samoa rugby league footballer (born 1999)

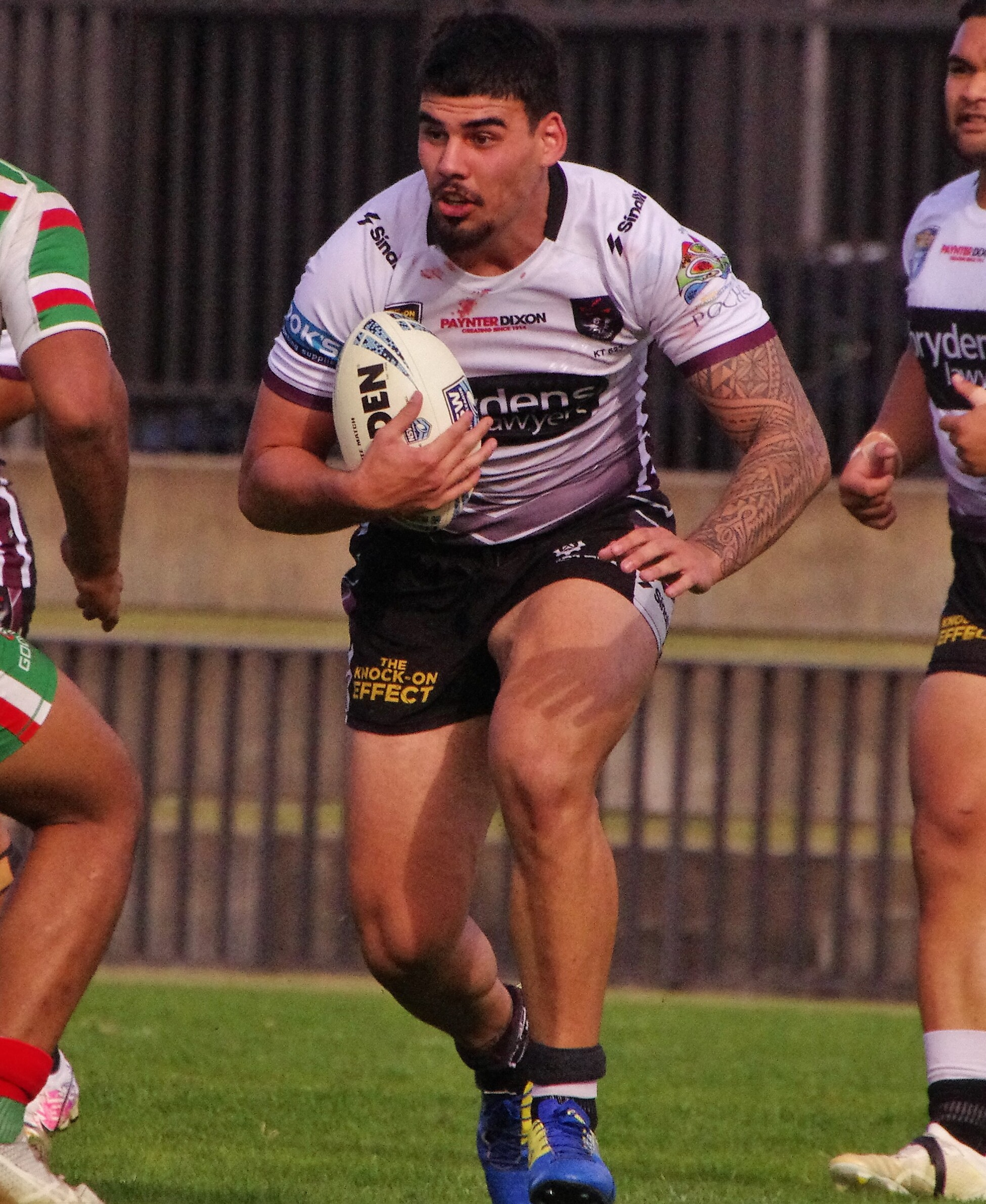

Personal information
- Full name: Terrell Davis May
- Born: 29 April 1999 (age 27) Blacktown, New South Wales, Australia

Playing information
- Height: 183 cm (6 ft 0 in)
- Weight: 108 kg (17 st 0 lb)
- Position: Prop
Club
Years	Team	Pld	T	G	FG	P
2022–24	Sydney Roosters	53	7	0	0	28
2025–	Wests Tigers	47	2	0	0	8
	Total	100	9	0	0	36
Representative
Years	Team	Pld	T	G	FG	P
2023–25	Samoa	6	0	0	0	0
- Relatives: Taylan May (brother); Tyrone May (brother)

Terrell Davis May (born 29 April 1999) is a Samoa international rugby league footballer who plays as a prop forward for the Wests Tigers in the National Rugby League.

== Background ==
May was born in Blacktown, New South Wales and played his junior rugby league for the Minchinbury Jets in the Penrith District Rugby League.

May's brothers Tyrone and Taylan are also professional rugby league players.

He is of Samoan and Australian of European descent. On 18 November 2024, he started his highly successful YouTube channel.

== Career ==
=== 2022 ===
May made his first grade debut for the Roosters against the Panthers in round 11 of the 2022 NRL season, in a 32–12 loss.

=== 2023 ===
May played 17 matches for the Sydney Roosters in the 2023 NRL season as the club finished 7th on the table and qualified for the finals. May played in both of the clubs finals games as they were eliminated in the second week against Melbourne. On 24 September, May played for North Sydney in their 2023 NSW Cup grand final loss against South Sydney.

=== 2024 ===
In round 9 of the 2024 NRL season, May scored two tries in the Sydney Roosters 40–18 victory over Brisbane. On 21 May, the Sydney Roosters hit back at claims that May had been taking illegal substances on a live stream along with fellow players Brandon Smith, Zach Dockar-Clay, Naufahu Whyte and Spencer Leniu. The club released a statement which read “The Sydney Roosters have been made aware of a small clip from a longer live stream that some on social media have claimed identifies behaviour that breaches NRL rules. “The clip reveals no use of illicit substances or any other breach of NRL rules, however some see fit to make that grossly distorted and clearly damaging claim".

May played 27 matches for the Sydney Roosters. He played in all three finals games for the club as they were eliminated at the preliminary final stage against Melbourne. On 31 October, it was reported that the Sydney Roosters had informed May he was free to negotiate with other clubs. May denied the release had anything do with any off field issues, the Sydney Roosters had decided they needed to move in another direction after an end of season review into club culture. On 18 November, it was announced that May had secured a release from the Roosters and had signed a three-year deal with the Wests Tigers.

=== 2025 ===
May made his club debut for the Wests Tigers in round 1 of the 2025 NRL season against Newcastle. On 18 May, May caused controversy after appearing on a Twitch livestream where he confirmed he would not be picked for New South Wales ahead of game one in the 2025 State of Origin series. May said on the livestream "You know that Blues jersey I bought you? Chuck it in the bin". He would then go on to say "Nah, it's not the media. How do you think it got leaked? You think they're not just playing Chinese whispers?". May also jokingly said that he might have to switch allegiances to Queensland in order to be picked which was slammed by former New South Wales head coach Brad Fittler. At the time, May was leading the competition in offloads, in third place of the Dally M leaderboard, and "widely regarded as the second-best prop in the game behind Haas".

One of two players to play in every game for the Tigers, he led the competition in offloads, and was second in runs and tackles, and third in run metres.

=== 2026 ===
On 1 May the Wests Tigers announced that May had re-signed with the club until the end of 2030. May featured in almost every game for the Wests Tigers in the 2026 NRL season as the club finished 15th on the table.

== Statistics ==
Year	Team	Games	Tries	Pts
2022	Sydney Roosters	9		
2023	Sydney Roosters	17	1	4
2024	Sydney Roosters	27	6	24
2025	Wests Tigers	24	1	4
2026	Wests Tigers	23	1	4
	Totals	100	9	36
