= Penioni Tagituimua =

Fiji international rugby league footballer

Peni Tagituimua
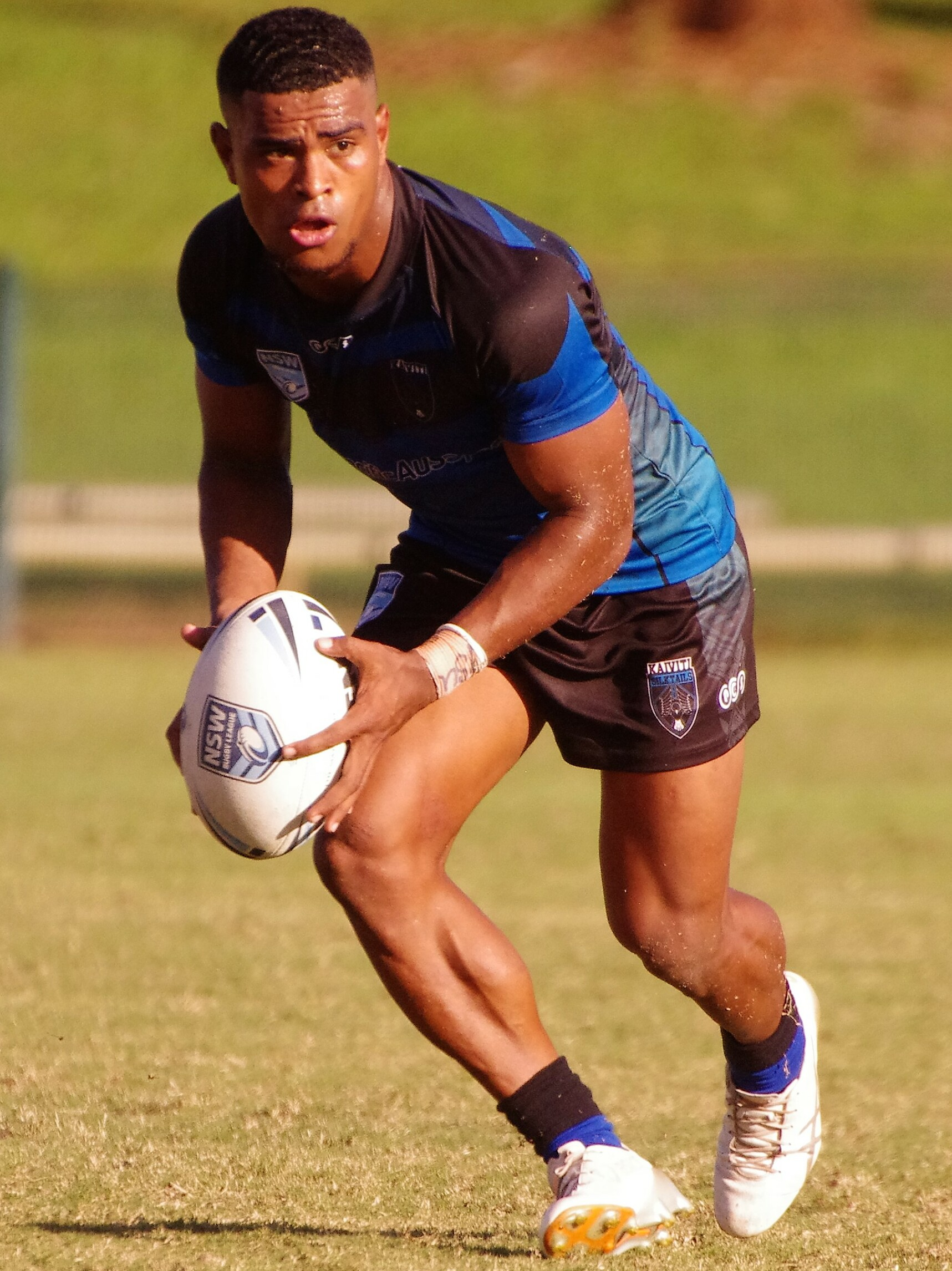

Personal information
- Full name: Penioni Tagituimua
- Born: 20 January 1999 (age 27) Suva, Central Division, Fiji
- Height: 175 cm (5 ft 9 in)
- Weight: 90 kg (14 st 2 lb)

Playing information
- Position: Hooker, Halfback
Club
Years	Team	Pld	T	G	FG	P
2020–	Kaiviti Silktails
Representative
Years	Team	Pld	T	G	FG	P
2019	Fiji Prime Minister's XIII	1	0	0	0	0
2019–	Fiji	9	2	0	0	8
2019	Fiji 9s	3	0	0	0	0
- Source: As of 2 November 2025

Penioni Tagituimua (born 20 January 1999) is a Fijian professional rugby league footballer who plays as a hooker or halfback for the Kaiviti Silktails in the Ron Massey Cup and Fiji at international level.

== Playing career ==
Tagituimua began playing rugby league in 2013 for the Nadera Panthers.

While attending Suva Grammar School in 2015, he was awarded a three-year rugby union scholarship at Ellesmere College.

In 2019, Tagituimua was the only player from the Fijian domestic competition to be included in Fiji's squad for their mid-season match against Lebanon. Initially selected to be the 18th man, a number of injuries and unavailabilities allowed him to make his Test debut off the interchange bench in the 56–14 win. In November, Tagituimua played off the interchange bench in both of Fiji's Oceania Cup matches.

Tagituimua joined the Kaiviti Silktails for their inaugural season in 2020, scoring twice in their first and only match of the COVID-19 affected year.

In 2021, Tagituimua was named the captain of the Kaiviti side.

On 23 May 2021, he made his NSW Cup debut after being called into the North Sydney Bears' team to play Mounties.

In the second group stage match of the 2021 Rugby League World Cup, Tagituimua scored two tries for Fiji in their 60–4 victory over Italy.

== Personal life ==
Tagituimua's father Ilaitia is a pastor and was a spiritual adviser for the Fijian team at the 2008, 2013, and 2017 Rugby League World Cups. Tagituimua's uncle Nemani Matirewa was a Fijian dual-code rugby international who was a pioneer of rugby league in the country.
