= Cooper Bai =

PNG international rugby league player

Personal information
- Born: 5 November 2006 (age 20) Gold Coast, Queensland, Australia
- Height: 192 cm (6 ft 4 in)
- Weight: 104 kg (16 st 5 lb)

Playing information
- Position: Lock
Club
Years	Team	Pld	T	G	FG	P
2025–	Gold Coast Titans	24	2	0	0	8
2028	Melbourne Storm
	Total	24	2	0	0	8
Representative
Years	Team	Pld	T	G	FG	P
2025	PNG Prime Minister's XIII	1	0	0	0	0
2025–	Papua New Guinea	2	1	0	0	4
- Source: As of 4 September 2026
- Education: Marymount College
- Father: Marcus Bai

Cooper Bai (born 5 November 2006) is a Papua New Guinea international rugby league footballer who plays as a lock for the Gold Coast Titans in the National Rugby League.

== Background ==
Bai was born on the Gold Coast, Queensland and is of Papua New Guinean descent. Bai's father, Marcus, is a former Papua New Guinean international who won premierships with Melbourne Storm in 1999 and Leeds Rhinos in 2004.

He played his junior rugby league for the Burleigh Bears and attended Marymount College before being signed by the Gold Coast Titans.

== Playing career ==
=== Early career ===
In 2023, while playing for Burleigh in the Mal Meninga Cup, he represented Queensland City Under-17. In 2024, Bai was 18th man for Queensland Under-19 in their loss to New South Wales.

=== 2025 ===
Bai joined the Titans' NRL squad on a development contract for the 2025 season. On 19 June, he started at lock and scored a try in Queensland Under-19's win over New South Wales. Later that month, he made his Queensland Cup debut for the Tweed Seagulls.

In Round 27 of the 2025 NRL season, he was named to make his NRL debut against the Wests Tigers.

In October 2025 he was named in the Papua New Guinea squad for the Pacific Bowl.

On 12 October 2025 he made his debut for the PNG Prime Minister's XIII in the 28-10 defeat to Australia’s Prime Minister's XIII in Port Moresby

=== 2026 ===
Bai played 21 games for the Gold Coast in the 2026 NRL season as the club finished 16th on the table. On 21 October, the Titans announced that Bai would depart the club at the end of the 2027 season after opting to not renew his contract. On 11 November 2026, Melbourne Storm announced that Bai had signed a three year deal with the club beginning in 2028.
