= Keano Kini =

NZ international rugby league footballer

Personal information
- Born: 14 April 2004 (age 22) Auckland, New Zealand
- Height: 177 cm (5 ft 10 in)
- Weight: 84 kg (13 st 3 lb)

Playing information
- Position: Fullback
Club
Years	Team	Pld	T	G	FG	P
2023–	Gold Coast Titans	52	9	4	0	44
Representative
Years	Team	Pld	T	G	FG	P
2024–	New Zealand	8	5	0	0	20
2025	Māori All Stars	1	0	0	0	0
- Source: As of 16 November 2026

Keano Kini (/kiːni/) (born 14 April 2004) is a New Zealand professional rugby league footballer who plays for the Gold Coast Titans as a fullback or wing in the National Rugby League and for New Zealand at international level.

== Background ==
Kini was born in Auckland, New Zealand and is of Māori, English and Samoan descent. His family relocated to the Gold Coast where Kini attended Palm Beach Currumbin State High School. Kini was a Northcote Tigers junior.

== Playing career ==
In 2020, Kini was signed by the Gold Coast Titans after being spotted playing oz tag football in Auckland. In 2021 and 2022, Kini played for the Titans' Queensland Cup feeder side, the Burleigh Bears. In 2023, despite still being on a development contract, Kini was elevated to the Gold Coast Titans first grade side.

Kini made his first grade debut from the bench in his side's 26–24 victory over the Parramatta Eels at Lang Park in round 10 of the 2023 NRL season. The fullbacks good form also continued for Burleigh where he won the Duncan Hall medal for man of the match in the 2023 Queensland Cup grand final despite playing on the losing side.

Kini scored his first NRL try in his sides Magic Round (NRL) match against the Newcastle Knights in round 11 of the 2024 NRL season. In round 16, Kini scored two tries for the Gold Coast in their 66–6 victory over the New Zealand Warriors. Kini played 16 games for the Gold Coast in the 2024 NRL season and won the Paul Broughton medal as the clubs best player as the Titans finished 14th on the table.

=== 2025 ===
On 26 March 2025, it was announced that Kini would be ruled out for an indefinite period after he suffered a neck injury during the Gold Coast's victory over Newcastle in round 3 of the 2025 NRL season. Kini revealed that he was just four millimeters from being paralysed (his spinal cord was already compressed by 10 millimeters) if he had taken another heavy tackle in the next game, and he had neck surgery in early April 2025 to address this issue. On 30 May, the Gold Coast announced that Kini had re-signed with the NRL club until October 2030 (end of the 2030 season). Kini played six matches for the Gold Coast in the 2025 NRL season as the club narrowly avoided the wooden spoon finishing 16th.

=== 2026 ===
Kini played almost every match for the Gold Coast in the 2026 NRL season as the club finished 16th on the table.

== Statistics ==
Year	Team	Games	Tries	Goals	Pts
2023	Gold Coast Titans	6	0	0	0
2024	Gold Coast Titans	16	6	4	32
2025	Gold Coast Titans	6	0	0	0
2026	Gold Coast Titans	15	3		12
2027	Gold Coast Titans				
	Totals	44	9	4	44

*denotes season competing
