= Ben Ioelu =

Samoa international rugby league footballer

Benaiah Ioelu

Personal information
- Full name: Benaiah Ioelu
- Born: 23 February 2004 (age 22) Auckland, New Zealand
- Height: 180 cm (5 ft 11 in)
- Weight: 91 kg (14 st 5 lb)

Playing information
- Position: Hooker
Club
Years	Team	Pld	T	G	FG	P
2025–	Sydney Roosters	17	0	0	0	0
Representative
Years	Team	Pld	T	G	FG	P
2025–	Samoa	7	2	0	0	8
- Source: As of 8 November 2026

Benaiah Ioelu (born 23 February 2004) is a Samoa international rugby league footballer who plays as a hooker for the Sydney Roosters in the National Rugby League.

== Background ==
Ioelu was born in raised in New Zealand and attended Tangaroa College being a prominent member of the U15's team. He signed for the New Zealand Warriors as a 15 year old in 2019 before moving to the Sydney Roosters in 2020.

== Career ==
In Round 12 2025, Ioelu made his NRL debut for the Roosters against the Cronulla Sharks at Central Coast Stadium. He started at Hooker in a 42-12 win.

Ioelu played 12 games in his rookie season, being named in the Samoa national squad for the 2025 Pacific Championships. Ioelu re-signed with the Roosters til the end of 2028.
