= 2024 Rugby League Pacific Championships =

- Number of teams: 6 (men); 7 (women)
- Host countries: Australia; New Zealand; Fiji; Papua New Guinea
- Winner: Men's Cup: Australia; Men's Bowl: Papua New Guinea; Women's Cup: Australia; Women's Bowl: Samoa

The 2024 Rugby League Pacific Championships were the third edition of the Rugby League Pacific Championships and the second under their current name (having previously been called the Oceania Cup in 2019). The championships consist of several international rugby league tournaments being played from October to November 2024 between nations of the Pacific region.

The competition format were confirmed as Pacific Cup and Pacific Bowl competitions for both genders, with teams being divided in each case between higher-ranked and lower-ranked sides.

The Asia-Pacific qualification tournament for the 2026 Women's Rugby League World Cup were integrated into the 2024 Pacific Championships as the Women's Pacific Bowl competition.

== Background ==
The August 2023 announcement of the Pacific Rugby League Championships, by the NRL and Australian Government, indicated that Fiji and Australia would co-host the tournament in 2024. In May 2024, Fiji National Rugby League chief executive Don Natabe announced that Fiji were expected to host five national teams in a month-long Rugby League festival.

On 19 August 2024, news website Stuff reported that a men's match between New Zealand and Tonga had been scheduled for Mount Smart Stadium, Auckland on Saturday, 2 November 2024. This was again reported three days later by The New Zealand Herald, going further with reporting New Zealand will host Australia on 27 October in Christchurch. The report also suggested that Samoa would not participate, contrary to reports in England suggesting that Samoa had reduced the length of their tour of England from three to two matches in order to play both the tour and the Pacific Championships. On 23 August 2024, the New Zealand Rugby League confirmed the fixtures for their men's and women's teams, including home matches in Christchurch and Auckland and an away match for the Kiwi Ferns in Port Moresby, Papua New Guinea. A report on the NRL website confirmed that Australia's opening matches of the tournament would be a double-header at Suncorp Stadium on the weekend of 18-20 October, with the women playing Papua New Guinea and the men playing Tonga.
An exact date for this double-header was not specified.

The remainder of the fixtures were announced in an NRL media release on 30 August 2024, apart from naming the venue, or venues, within Fiji for the games scheduled in that country. The date of the opening fixtures at Suncorp Stadium, Brisbane was announced to be Friday, 18 October 2024.

The media release of 30 August also announced the introduction of promotion and relegation matches between the third-placed Pacific Cup team and the first-placed Pacific Bowl team in both the men's and women's tournaments. This is a change in format from the 2023 Pacific Championships.

- In the men's Pacific Bowl, the first-placed team (from the three teams competing) will be determined based on the three scheduled fixtures, without a final.
- In the women's Pacific Bowl, the first-placed team (from the four teams competing) will be determined based on three knockout matches, with seedings based on IRL rankings. Two semi-finals will be held over the first two weekends, with a final on the third weekend of the tournament. The winner of the final will qualify for the promotion / relegation play-off to the 2025 Pacific Championship.

The women's Pacific Bowl will also act as the Asia-Pacific qualifying tournament for the 2026 World Cup. The Bowl winners will become the seventh team to qualify for the 2026 World Cup, while the runners up will go forward to the 2025 qualifying tournament to decide the eighth and final team to go to the World Cup.

On 9 September 2024, the National Stadium in Suva was confirmed as the venue for the games that Fiji are to host on 19 and 26 October 2024.

== Teams ==
=== Team changes ===
Women's teams competed formally in the Pacific Championships for the in 2024. The Men's Pacific Cup saw one change, Tonga replacing Samoa, with the latter touring England during the championships as the former did the year prior.

=== Squads ===
Australia were the first nation to announced their playing squads, on 7 October 2024. Playing squads for other nations will be announced closer to the tournament's 18 October 2024 commencement.

=== Men's teams ===
| Competition | Team | World ranking | Coach | Captain | Ref |
|---|---|---|---|---|---|
| Pacific Cup | Australia | 1 | (Australia) Mal Meninga | Isaah Yeo | |
| Pacific Cup | New Zealand | 2 | (New Zealand) Stacey Jones | James Fisher-Harris | |
| Pacific Cup | Tonga | 5 | (Australia) Kristian Woolf | Addin Fonua-Blake and Jason Taumalolo | |
| Pacific Bowl | Cook Islands | 10 | (Australia) Karmichael Hunt | Brad Takairangi | |
| Pacific Bowl | Fiji | 6 | (Fiji) Wise Kativerata | Tui Kamikamica | |
| Pacific Bowl | Papua New Guinea | 7 | (Australia) Jason Demetriou | Rhyse Martin and Lachlan Lam | |

- Samoa (ranked 4th) undertake a tour of England with two tests scheduled for Sunday, 27 October and Saturday, 2 November 2024.

=== Women's teams ===
| Competition | Team | World ranking | Coach | Captain(s) | Ref |
|---|---|---|---|---|---|
| Pacific Cup | Australia | 1 | (Australia) Brad Donald | Kezie Apps and Ali Brigginshaw | |
| Pacific Cup | New Zealand | 2 | (New Zealand) Ricky Henry | Georgia Hale | |
| Pacific Cup | Papua New Guinea | 5 | (Australia) Tahnee Norris | Elsie Albert | |
| Pacific Bowl (Asia-Pacific qualification tournament for the 2026 Women's Rugby League World Cup) | Cook Islands | 6 | (New Zealand) Rusty Matua | Kiana Takairangi | |
| Pacific Bowl (Asia-Pacific qualification tournament for the 2026 Women's Rugby League World Cup) | Fiji | 26 | (Fiji) Josaia Dakuitoga | Talei Holmes | |
| Pacific Bowl (Asia-Pacific qualification tournament for the 2026 Women's Rugby League World Cup) | Samoa | 24 | (Australia) Jamie Soward | Annetta-Claudia Nuuausala | |
| Pacific Bowl (Asia-Pacific qualification tournament for the 2026 Women's Rugby League World Cup) | Tonga | 14 | (Australia) Kelvin Wright | Vanessa Foliaki and Natasha Penitani | |

Note: NRLW Roosters' coach John Strange was appointed Tonga coach in early September 2024 but subsequently stood down.

=== Wheelchair teams ===
| Competition | Team | World ranking | Coach | Captain | Ref |
|---|---|---|---|---|---|
| Wheelchair | Australia | 3 | Brett Clark | Brad Grove | |
| Wheelchair | New Zealand | No Ranking (on debut) | Edie George | Jayson Hooker | |

== Venues ==
Venues in Australia, New Zealand, Papua New Guinea and Fiji have been confirmed.

Host venues
1 Lang Park, Brisbane
2 National Stadium, Suva
3 Rugby League Park, Christchurch
4 Mount Smart Stadium, Auckland
5 PNG Football Stadium, Port Moresby
6 Western Sydney Stadium, Sydney

Six venues across four countries were selected to host the Championships.

- Brisbane, Australia: Lang Park will host two matches on the evening of Friday, 18 October 2024, Australia playing Papua New Guinea in the women's Cup and Tonga in the men's Cup.
- Suva, Fiji: National Stadium will host two-double headers (four games in all) on Saturday, 19 October and Saturday, 26 October 2024.
- Christchurch, New Zealand: Rugby League Park will host two matches on 27 October 2024, a women's and men's double-header between New Zealand and Australia.
- Auckland, New Zealand: Mount Smart Stadium will host two matches on 2 November 2024, the women's Bowl Final and a men's Cup match between New Zealand and Tonga.
- Port Moresby, Papua New Guinea: PNG Football Stadium will host a double-header on Sunday, 3 November 2024.
- Sydney, Australia: Western Sydney Stadium will host a quadruple-header on Sunday, 10 November 2024. The order of matches is: women's playoff, women's Cup final, men's playoff, men's Cup final.

== Men's Pacific Cup ==
=== Standings ===
| Pos | Team | Pld | W | D | L | PF | PA | PD | Pts | Qualification |
|---|---|---|---|---|---|---|---|---|---|---|
| 1 | Australia | 2 | 2 | 0 | 0 | 40 | 10 | +30 | 4 | Advance to final |
| 2 | Tonga | 2 | 1 | 0 | 1 | 25 | 42 | −17 | 2 | Advance to final |
| 3 | New Zealand | 2 | 0 | 0 | 2 | 34 | 47 | −13 | 0 | Consigned to Relegation playoff |

Updated to match(es) played on 2 November 2024. Source: Draw at NRL

NB: Samoa had intended to participate, but opted for a tour of England instead.

=== Fixtures ===
==== Group stage ====
18 October 2024
19:10 AEST (UTC+10:00)

| Australia | 18–0 | Tonga |
|---|---|---|
| Tries: 3 Trbojevic 12'; Tabuai-Fidow 51'; Dearden 78'; Goals: 3 Lomax 3/4 13', 53', pen 58' | 1st: 6–0; 2nd: 12–0; Report | Tries: 0 Goals: 0 |

Lang Park, Brisbane
Attendance: 33,196
Referee: Gerard Sutton (Australia)
Senior review official: Ashley Klein (Australia)
Touch judges: Drew Oultram (Australia), Michael Wise (Australia)
Player of the Match: Hamiso Tabuai-Fidow (Australia)

Team details
| Australia | | Position | Tonga |
| Name | Number | Position | Number | Name |
|---|---|---|---|---|
| Dylan Edwards | 1 | FB | 1 | Lehi Hopoate |
| Xavier Coates | 2 | WG | 2 | Daniel Tupou |
| Hamiso Tabuai-Fidow | 3 | CE | 3 | Moses Suli |
| Tom Trbojevic | 4 | CE | 4 | Paul Alamoti |
| Zac Lomax | 5 | WG | 5 | Sione Katoa |
| Tom Dearden | 6 | SO/FE | 6 | Tuimoala Lolohea |
| Mitchell Moses | 7 | SH/HB | 7 | Isaiya Katoa |
| Patrick Carrigan | 8 | PR | 8 | Addin Fonua-Blake (c) |
| Harry Grant | 9 | HK | 9 | Siliva Havili |
| Lindsay Collins | 10 | PF | 10 | Felise Kaufusi |
| Angus Crichton | 11 | SR | 11 | Haumole Olakau'atu |
| Cameron Murray | 12 | SR | 12 | Eliesa Katoa |
| Isaah Yeo (c) | 13 | LF/LK | 13 | Jason Taumalolo (c) |
| Matt Burton | 14 | IN | 14 | Soni Luke |
| Mitchell Barnett | 15 | IN | 15 | Sitili Tupouniua |
| Reuben Cotter | 16 | IN | 16 | Taniela Paseka |
| Hudson Young | 17 | IN | 17 | Keaon Koloamatangi |
| Ben Hunt | 18 | CS | 18 | Toluta'u Koula |
| Mal Meninga | | Coach | | Kristian Woolf |

27 October 2024
18:05 NZDT (UTC+13:00)

| New Zealand | 10–22 | Australia |
|---|---|---|
| Tries: 2 Isaako 25'; Warbrick 64'; Goals: 1 Isaako 1/2 27' | 1st: 6–12; 2nd: 4–10; Report | Tries: 4 Collins 15'; Lomax 35', 58'; Moses 71'; Goals: 3 Lomax 3/5 15', pen 39', 73' |

Rugby League Park, Christchurch
Attendance: 17,005
Referee: Ashley Klein (Australia)
Senior review official: Gerard Sutton (Australia)
Touch judges: Phil Henderson (Australia), Chris Sutton (Australia)
Player of the Match: Harry Grant (Australia)

Team details
| New Zealand | | Position | Australia |
| Name | Number | Position | Number | Name |
|---|---|---|---|---|
| Keano Kini | 1 | FB | 1 | Dylan Edwards |
| Jamayne Isaako | 2 | WG | 2 | Xavier Coates |
| Matthew Timoko | 3 | CE | 3 | Hamiso Tabuai-Fidow |
| Peta Hiku | 4 | CE | 4 | Tom Trbojevic |
| William Warbrick | 5 | WG | 5 | Zac Lomax |
| Charnze Nicoll-Klokstad | 6 | SO/FE | 6 | Tom Dearden |
| Shaun Johnson | 7 | SH/HB | 7 | Mitchell Moses |
| James Fisher-Harris (c) | 8 | PR | 8 | Patrick Carrigan |
| Phoenix Crossland | 9 | HK | 9 | Harry Grant |
| Naufahu Whyte | 10 | PF | 10 | Lindsay Collins |
| Isaiah Papali'i | 11 | SR | 11 | Angus Crichton |
| Scott Sorensen | 12 | SR | 12 | Cameron Murray |
| Joseph Tapine | 13 | LF/LK | 13 | Isaah Yeo (c) |
| Griffin Neame | 14 | IN | 14 | Matt Burton |
| Kodi Nikorima | 15 | IN | 15 | Mitchell Barnett |
| Marata Niukore | 16 | IN | 16 | Reuben Cotter |
| Jordan Riki | 17 | IN | 17 | Hudson Young |
| Erin Clark | 18 | CS | 18 | Ben Hunt |
| Stacey Jones | | Coach | | Mal Meninga |

2 November 2024
20:05 NZDT (UTC+13:00)

| New Zealand | 24–25 | Tonga |
|---|---|---|
| Tries: 4 Papali'i 35'; Kini 50'; Crossland 58'; Tapine 66'; Goals: 4 Isaako 4/5 36', 51', 59', 67'; Field goals: 0 Johnson 0/1; Isaako 0/1 | 1st: 6–24; 2nd: 18–1; Report | Tries: 4 S. Katoa 2'; Fonua-Blake 22'; Havili 26'; Luke 32'; Goals: 4 I. Katoa 4/5 4', pen 12', 23', 33'; Field goals: 1 I. Katoa 1/1 75' |

Mount Smart Stadium, Auckland
Attendance: 22,363
Referee: Todd Smith (Australia)
Senior review official: Wyatt Raymond (Australia)
Touch judges: Dave Munro (Australia)

Team details
| New Zealand | | Position | Tonga |
| Name | Number | Position | Number | Name |
|---|---|---|---|---|
| Keano Kini | 1 | FB | 1 | Lehi Hopoate |
| Jamayne Isaako | 2 | WG | 2 | Daniel Tupou |
| Matthew Timoko | 3 | CE | 3 | Moses Suli |
| Peta Hiku | 4 | CE | 4 | Paul Alamoti |
| William Warbrick | 5 | WG | 5 | Sione Katoa |
| Charnze Nicoll-Klokstad | 6 | SO/FE | 6 | Tuimoala Lolohea |
| Shaun Johnson | 7 | SH/HB | 7 | Isaiya Katoa |
| James Fisher-Harris (c) | 8 | PR | 8 | Addin Fonua-Blake (c) |
| Phoenix Crossland | 9 | HK | 9 | Siliva Havili |
| Joseph Tapine | 10 | PF | 10 | Felise Kaufusi |
| Isaiah Papali'i | 11 | SR | 11 | Haumole Olakau'atu |
| Scott Sorensen | 12 | SR | 12 | Eliesa Katoa |
| Leo Thompson | 17 | LF/LK | 13 | Jason Taumalolo (c) |
| Naufahu Whyte | 13 | IN | 14 | Soni Luke |
| Kodi Nikorima | 14 | IN | 15 | Sitili Tupouniua |
| Griffin Neame | 15 | IN | 16 | Taniela Paseka |
| Marata Niukore | 16 | IN | 17 | Siua Wong |
| Erin Clark | 18 | CS | 18 | Toluta'u Koula |
| Stacey Jones | | Coach | | Kristian Woolf |

==== Men's final ====
10 November 2024
16:05 AEDT (UTC+11:00)

| Australia | 20–14 | Tonga |
|---|---|---|
| Tries: 4 Tabuai-Fidow 15'; Coates 25'; Trbojevic 35', 42'; Goals: 2 Lomax 2/4 37', 44' | 1st: 14–4; 2nd: 6–10; Report | Tries: 3 S. Katoa 6'; Olakau'atu 57'; E. Katoa 73'; Goals: 1 I. Katoa 1/3 58' |

Western Sydney Stadium, Sydney
Attendance: 28,728
Referee: Ashley Klein (Australia)
Senior review official: Liam Kennedy (Australia)
Touch judges: Drew Oultram (Australia), Michael Wise (Australia)
Player of the Match: Tom Dearden (Australia)

Team details
| Australia | | Position | Tonga |
| Name | Number | Position | Number | Name |
|---|---|---|---|---|
| Dylan Edwards | 1 | FB | 1 | Lehi Hopoate |
| Xavier Coates | 2 | WG | 2 | Daniel Tupou |
| Hamiso Tabuai-Fidow | 3 | CE | 18 | Toluta'u Koula |
| Tom Trbojevic | 4 | CE | 4 | Paul Alamoti |
| Zac Lomax | 5 | WG | 5 | Sione Katoa |
| Tom Dearden | 6 | SO/FE | 6 | Tuimoala Lolohea |
| Mitchell Moses | 7 | SH/HB | 7 | Isaiya Katoa |
| Patrick Carrigan | 8 | PR | 8 | Addin Fonua-Blake (c) |
| Harry Grant | 9 | HK | 9 | Siliva Havili |
| Lindsay Collins | 10 | PF | 10 | Felise Kaufusi |
| Angus Crichton | 11 | SR | 11 | Haumole Olakau'atu |
| Hudson Young | 12 | SR | 12 | Eliesa Katoa |
| Isaah Yeo (c) | 13 | LF/LK | 13 | Jason Taumalolo (c) |
| Matt Burton | 14 | IN | 14 | Soni Luke |
| Mitchell Barnett | 15 | IN | 16 | Taniela Paseka |
| Reuben Cotter | 16 | IN | 17 | Siua Wong |
| Lindsay Smith | 17 | IN | 19 | Keaon Koloamatangi |
| Ben Hunt | 18 | CS | 15 | Sitili Tupouniua |
| Mal Meninga | | Coach | | Kristian Woolf |

== Men's Pacific Bowl ==
=== Standings ===
| Pos | Team | Pld | W | D | L | PF | PA | PD | Pts | Qualification |
|---|---|---|---|---|---|---|---|---|---|---|
| 1 | Papua New Guinea | 2 | 2 | 0 | 0 | 64 | 30 | +34 | 4 | Advance to Promotion playoff |
| 2 | Fiji | 2 | 1 | 0 | 1 | 66 | 28 | +38 | 2 | |
| 3 | Cook Islands | 2 | 0 | 0 | 2 | 26 | 98 | −72 | 0 | |

Updated to match(es) played on 3 November 2024. Source: Draw at NRL

=== Fixtures ===
==== Group stage ====
19 October 2024
20:10 FJT (UTC+12:00)

| Fiji | 10–22 | Papua New Guinea |
|---|---|---|
| Tries: 2 Valemei 47'; Sivo 79'; Goals: 1 Milne 1/2 79' | 1st: 0–16; 2nd: 10–6; Report | Tries: 4 Derby 17'; Rimbu 24'; Namo 36'; Macdonald 51'; Goals: 3 Martin 3/4 26', 38', 53' |

National Stadium, Suva
Attendance: 7,581
Referee: Wyatt Raymond (Australia)
Senior review official: Liam Kennedy (Australia)
Touch judges: Phil Henderson (Australia), Jon Stone (Australia)

Team details
| Fiji | | Position | Papua New Guinea |
| Name | Number | Position | Number | Name |
|---|---|---|---|---|
| Sunia Turuva | 1 | FB | 1 | Nene Macdonald |
| Maika Sivo | 2 | WG | 2 | Elijah Roltinga |
| Michael Jennings | 3 | CE | 3 | Robert Mathias |
| Waqa Blake | 4 | CE | 4 | Rodrick Tai |
| Semi Valemei | 5 | WG | 5 | Robert Derby |
| Kevin Naiqama | 6 | SO/FE | 6 | Kyle Laybutt (c) |
| Kurt Donoghoe | 7 | SH/HB | 7 | Lachlan Lam |
| Tui Kamikamica (c) | 8 | PR | 8 | Valentine Richard |
| Penioni Tagituimua | 9 | HK | 14 | Liam Horne |
| Ben Nakubuwai | 10 | PF | 10 | Jacob Alick-Wiencke |
| Viliame Kikau | 11 | SR | 11 | Rhyse Martin |
| Taane Milne | 15 | SR | 12 | Jeremiah Simbiken |
| Caleb Navale | 13 | LF/LK | 13 | Jack de Belin |
| Kitione Kautoga | 12 | IN | 9 | Judah Rimbu |
| Joe Lovodua | 14 | IN | 15 | Koso Bandi |
| Jordan Miller | 17 | IN | 22 | Ila Alu |
| Nathan Kegg-Smith | 20 | IN | 23 | Sylvester Namo |
| Kylan Mafoa | 16 | CS | 18 | Daniel Russell |
| Wise Kativerata | | Coach | | Jason Demetriou |

26 October 2024
20:10 FJT (UTC+12:00)

| Fiji | 56–6 | Cook Islands |
|---|---|---|
| Tries: 10; Jennings 19', 27', 60'; Valemei 51', 74'; Sivo 69', 71'; Turuva 14'; Kautoga 34'; Nakubuwai 65'; Goals: 8 Milne 7/7 16', 20', 29', 36', 53', 70', 73'; Naiqama 1/2 66'; Valevatu 0/1 | 1st: 24–6; 2nd: 32–0; Report | Tries: 1 Ngatikaura 10'; Goals: 1 S. Marsters 1/1 12' |

National Stadium, Suva
Attendance: 5,943
Referee: Chris Butler (Australia)
Senior review official: Wyatt Raymond (Australia)
Touch judges: Dave Munro (Australia)

Team details
| Fiji | | Position | Cook Islands |
| Name | Number | Position | Number | Name |
|---|---|---|---|---|
| Sunia Turuva | 1 | FB | 1 | Esom Ioka |
| Maika Sivo | 2 | WG | 2 | Steven Marsters |
| Michael Jennings | 3 | CE | 3 | Reubenn Rennie |
| Waqa Blake | 4 | CE | 4 | Delahia Wigmore |
| Semi Valemei | 5 | WG | 5 | Rixson Andrew |
| Kevin Naiqama | 6 | SO/FE | 6 | Brad Takairangi (c) |
| Kurt Donoghoe | 7 | SH/HB | 7 | Esan Marsters |
| Tui Kamikamica (c) | 8 | PR | 8 | Tepai Moeroa |
| James Valevatu | 9 | HK | 9 | Ruatapu Ngatikaura |
| Ben Nakubuwai | 10 | PF | 10 | Davvy Moale |
| Viliame Kikau | 11 | SR | 11 | Zane Tetevano |
| Taane Milne | 12 | SR | 12 | Reuben Porter |
| Caleb Navale | 13 | LF/LK | 13 | Pride Petterson-Robati |
| Penioni Tagituimua | 14 | IN | 14 | Kobe Tararo |
| Kitione Kautoga | 15 | IN | 15 | Mason Teague |
| Kylan Mafoa | 16 | IN | 17 | Justin Makirere |
| Jordan Miller | 17 | IN | 18 | Junior Teroi |
| Ratu Rinakama | 18 | CS | 16 | Rhys Dakin |
| Wise Kativerata | | Coach | | Karmichael Hunt |

3 November 2024
15:00 PNGST (UTC+10:00)

| Papua New Guinea | 42–20 | Cook Islands |
|---|---|---|
| Tries: 8 Roltinga 5', 49'; Macdonald 31', 57'; Lam 35'; Derby 42'; Namo 46'; Morea 79'; Goals: 5 Laybutt 5/8 32', 36', 44', 47', 50' | 1st: 16–14; 2nd: 26–6; Report | Tries: 3 Moale 8'; S. Masters 27'; Ioka 71'; Goals: 4 S. Masters 4/4 10', pen 17', 29', 72' |

PNG Football Stadium, Port Moresby
Attendance: TBA
Referee: Peter Gough (Australia)
Senior review official: Chris Butler (Australia)
Touch judges: Phil Henderson (Australia),

Team details
| Papua New Guinea | | Position | Cook Islands |
| Name | Number | Position | Number | Name |
|---|---|---|---|---|
| Nene Macdonald | 1 | FB | 7 | Esan Marsters |
| Elijah Roltinga | 2 | WG | 1 | Esom Ioka |
| Robert Mathias | 3 | CE | 3 | Reubenn Rennie |
| Rodrick Tai | 4 | CE | 4 | Delahia Wigmore |
| Robert Derby | 5 | WG | 2 | Steven Marsters |
| Kyle Laybutt (c) | 6 | SO/FE | 6 | Brad Takairangi (c) |
| Lachlan Lam | 7 | SH/HB | 15 | Mason Teague |
| Jacob Alick-Wiencke | 10 | PR | 8 | Tepai Moeroa |
| Judah Rimbu | 9 | HK | 9 | Ruatapu Ngatikaura |
| Ila Alu | 17 | PF | 10 | Davvy Moale |
| Daniel Russell | 11 | SR | 12 | Reuben Porter |
| Jeremiah Simbiken | 12 | SR | 13 | Pride Petterson-Robati |
| Jack de Belin | 13 | LF/LK | 11 | Zane Tetevano |
| Valentine Richard | 8 | IN | 14 | Kobe Tararo |
| Liam Horne | 14 | IN | 16 | Rhys Dakin |
| Koso Bandi | 15 | IN | 18 | Junior Teroi |
| Sylvester Namo | 16 | IN | 20 | Makahesi Makatoa |
| Morea Morea | 19 | CS | 17 | Justin Makirere |
| Jason Demetriou | | Coach | | Karmichael Hunt |

==== Men's promotion/relegation playoff ====
10 November 2024
18:20 AEDT (UTC+11:00)

| New Zealand | 54–12 | Papua New Guinea |
|---|---|---|
| Tries: 10; McLean 4', 44', 56', 60'; Isaako 11', 69', 74'; Thompson 37'; Nicoll-Klokstad 40'; Whyte 72'; Goals: 7 Isaako (7/10) 5', 39', 40', 45', 62', 71', 74' | 1st: 22–6; 2nd: 32–6; Report | Tries: 2 Namo 20'; Derby 64'; Goals: 2 Rhyse Martin (2/2) 22', 65' |

Western Sydney Stadium, Sydney
Attendance: TBA
Referee: Gerard Sutton (Australia)
Senior review official: Chris Butler (Australia)
Touch judges: Dave Munro (Australia), Chris Sutton (Australia)

Team details
| New Zealand | | Position | Papua New Guinea |
| Name | Number | Position | Number | Name |
|---|---|---|---|---|
| Keano Kini | 1 | FB | 1 | Nene Macdonald |
| Jamayne Isaako | 2 | WG | 2 | Elijah Roltinga |
| Matthew Timoko | 3 | CE | 3 | Robert Mathias |
| Peta Hiku | 4 | CE | 4 | Rodrick Tai |
| Casey McLean | 20 | WG | 5 | Robert Derby |
| Charnze Nicoll-Klokstad | 6 | SO/FE | 6 | Kyle Laybutt (c) |
| Shaun Johnson | 7 | SH/HB | 7 | Lachlan Lam |
| James Fisher-Harris (c) | 8 | PR | 8 | Valentine Richard |
| Phoenix Crossland | 9 | HK | 9 | Liam Horne |
| Joseph Tapine | 10 | PF | 10 | Jacob Alick-Wiencke |
| Isaiah Papali'i | 11 | SR | 11 | Rhyse Martin |
| Scott Sorensen | 12 | SR | 12 | Jeremiah Simbiken |
| Naufahu Whyte | 13 | LF/LK | 13 | Jack de Belin |
| Kodi Nikorima | 14 | IN | 14 | Judah Rimbu |
| Griffin Neame | 15 | IN | 15 | Koso Bandi |
| Leo Thompson | 17 | IN | 16 | Sylvester Namo |
| Erin Clark | 18 | IN | 17 | Ila Alu |
| Marata Niukore | 16 | CS | 18 | Daniel Russell |
| Stacey Jones | | Coach | | Jason Demetriou |

== Women's Pacific Cup ==
=== Standings ===
| Pos | Team | Pld | W | D | L | PF | PA | PD | Pts | Qualification |
|---|---|---|---|---|---|---|---|---|---|---|
| 1 | Australia | 2 | 2 | 0 | 0 | 98 | 0 | +98 | 4 | Advance to final |
| 2 | New Zealand | 2 | 1 | 0 | 1 | 36 | 14 | +22 | 2 | Advance to final |
| 3 | Papua New Guinea | 2 | 0 | 0 | 2 | 0 | 120 | −120 | 0 | Consigned to Relegation playoff |

Updated to match(es) played on 27 October 2024. Source: Draw at NRL

NB: All three teams have already qualified for the 2026 Women's Rugby League World Cup.

=== Fixtures ===
==== Group stage ====
18 October 2024
17:05 AEST (UTC+10:00)

| Australia | 84–0 | Papua New Guinea |
|---|---|---|
| Tries: 17; Upton 7', 39'; Robinson 15', 18', 27', 36', 52', 62'; Whitfeld 24', 29', 33', 50', 55'; Penitani 43'; Kelly 47', 69'; Sergis 68'; Goals: 8 Aiken 8/16 9', 17', 28', 30', 40', 48', 63', 69'; Taufa 0/1 | 1st: 36–0; 2nd: 48–0; Report | Tries: 0 Goals: 0 |

Lang Park, Brisbane
Attendance: 18,486
Referee: Belinda Sharpe (Australia)
Senior Review Official: Peter Gough (Australia)
Touch judges: Daniel Schwass (Australia), Dave Munro (Australia)

Team details
| Australia | | Position | Papua New Guinea |
| Name | Number | Position | Number | Name |
|---|---|---|---|---|
| Tamika Upton | 1 | FB | 1 | Mala Mark |
| Julia Robinson | 2 | WG | 2 | Freda Waula |
| Isabelle Kelly | 3 | CE | 3 | Belinda Gwasamun |
| Jessica Sergis | 18 | CE | 4 | La-Toniya Norris-Addo |
| Jakiya Whitfeld | 5 | WG | 5 | Lyiannah Allen |
| Tiana Penitani | 4 | SO/FE | 6 | Sera Koroi |
| Tarryn Aiken | 7 | SH/HB | 7 | Delailah Ahose |
| Millie Elliott | 8 | PR | 8 | Essay Banu |
| Quincy Dodd | 9 | HK | 9 | Ua Ravu |
| Shannon Mato | 10 | PF | 10 | Elsie Albert (c) |
| Kezie Apps (c) | 11 | SR | 11 | Sareka Mooka |
| Yasmin Clydsdale | 12 | SR | 12 | Emily Veivers |
| Simaima Taufa | 13 | LF/LK | 13 | Gloria Kaupa |
| Olivia Higgins | 14 | IN | 14 | Roswita Kapo |
| Sarah Togatuki | 15 | IN | 15 | Jessikah Reeves |
| Keilee Joseph | 16 | IN | 16 | Talitha Kunjil |
| Mahalia Murphy | 17 | IN | 17 | Leila Kerowa |
| Abbi Church | 19 | CS | 18 | Lilah Malabag |
| Brad Donald | | Coach | | Tahnee Norris |

27 October 2024
15:35 NZDT (UTC+13:00)

| New Zealand | 0–14 | Australia |
|---|---|---|
| Tries: 0 Goals: 0 | 1st: 0–4; 2nd: 0–10; Report | Tries: 3 Penitani 31'; Upton 50'; Sergis 54'; Goals: 1 Aiken 1/3 51' |

Rugby League Park, Christchurch
Attendance: 10,289
Referee: Liam Kennedy (Australia)
Senior Review Official: Todd Smith (Australia)
Touch judges: Jon Stone (Australia)

Team details
| New Zealand | | Position | Australia |
| Name | Number | Position | Number | Name |
|---|---|---|---|---|
| Apii Nicholls-Pualau | 1 | FB | 1 | Tamika Upton |
| Leianne Tufuga | 2 | WG | 2 | Julia Robinson |
| Mele Hufanga | 3 | CE | 3 | Isabelle Kelly |
| Abigail Roache | 4 | CE | 4 | Tiana Penitani |
| Shanice Parker | 5 | WG | 5 | Jakiya Whitfeld |
| Gayle Broughton | 6 | SO/FE | 6 | Ali Brigginshaw (c) |
| Tyla King | 7 | SH/HB | 7 | Tarryn Aiken |
| Brianna Clark | 8 | PR | 8 | Millie Elliott |
| Brooke Anderson | 9 | HK | 9 | Olivia Higgins |
| Angelina Teakaraanga-Katoa | 10 | PF | 10 | Shannon Mato |
| Annessa Biddle | 11 | SR | 11 | Kezie Apps (c) |
| Najvada George | 15 | SR | 12 | Yasmin Clydsdale |
| Georgia Hale (c) | 13 | LF/LK | 13 | Simaima Taufa |
| Amber Hall | 12 | IN | 15 | Sarah Togatuki |
| Ashleigh Quinlan | 14 | IN | 16 | Keilee Joseph |
| Alexis Tauaneai | 16 | IN | 17 | Mahalia Murphy |
| Tiana Davison | 17 | IN | 18 | Jessica Sergis |
| Otesa Pule | 18 | CS | 20 | Keeley Davis |
| Ricky Henry | | Coach | | Brad Donald |

3 November 2024
12:55 PNGST (UTC+10:00)

| Papua New Guinea | 0–36 | New Zealand |
|---|---|---|
| Tries: 0 Goals: 0 | 1st: 0–16; 2nd: 0–20; Report | Tries: 7 Tufuga 1', 23'; Teakaraanga-Katoa 26'; Wiki 44', 50', 68'; Quinlan 56'; Goals: 4 King 4/7 24', 27', 45', 57' |

PNG Football Stadium, Port Moresby
Referee: Daniel Schwass (Australia)
Senior Review Official: Chris Butler (Australia)
Touch judges: Chris Sutton (Australia)

Team details
| Papua New Guinea | | Position | New Zealand |
| Name | Number | Position | Number | Name |
|---|---|---|---|---|
| Shae Yvonne De La Cruz | 1 | FB | 1 | Shanice Parker |
| Jenny Wesley | 4 | WG | 2 | Mackenzie Wiki |
| Belinda Gwasamun | 3 | CE | 3 | Mele Hufanga |
| Leila Kerowa | 11 | CE | 4 | Abigail Roache |
| Lyiannah Allen | 5 | WG | 5 | Leianne Tufuga |
| Sera Koroi | 6 | SO/FE | 6 | Gayle Broughton |
| Ua Ravu | 7 | SH/HB | 7 | Tyla King |
| Elsie Albert (c) | 8 | PR | 8 | Brianna Clark |
| Therese Aiton | 9 | HK | 9 | Brooke Anderson |
| Essay Banu | 10 | PF | 10 | Alexis Tauaneai |
| Emily Veivers | 12 | SR | 11 | Najvada George |
| Sareka Mooka | 13 | SR | 12 | Amber Hall |
| Gloria Kaupa | 16 | LF/LK | 13 | Georgia Hale (c) |
| Jessikah Reeves | 15 | IN | 14 | Ashleigh Quinlan |
| Yolanda Taute | 17 | IN | 15 | Otesa Pule |
| Lilah Malabag | 18 | IN | 16 | Brooke Talataina |
| Roswita Kapo | 19 | IN | 17 | Angelina Teakaraanga-Katoa |
| Mala Mark | 2 | CS | 18 | Cheyelle Robins-Reti |
| Tahnee Norris | | Coach | | Ricky Henry |

==== Women's final ====
10 November 2024
13:50 AEDT (UTC+11:00)

| Australia | 24–4 | New Zealand |
|---|---|---|
| Tries: 5 Robinson 8'; Kelly 15'; Penitani 31'; Upton 42'; Aiken 46'; Goals: 2 Aiken 2/5 44', 47' | 1st: 12–0; 2nd: 12–4; Report | Tries: 1 Tufuga 68'; Goals: 0 |

Western Sydney Stadium, Sydney
Attendance: 17,503
Referee: Belinda Sharpe (Australia)
Senior Review Official: Peter Gough (Australia)
Touch judges: Phil Henderson (Australia), Jon Stone (Australia)
Player of the Match: Tarryn Aiken (Australia)

Team details
| Australia | | Position | New Zealand |
| Name | Number | Position | Number | Name |
|---|---|---|---|---|
| Tamika Upton | 1 | FB | 1 | Apii Nicholls-Pualau |
| Julia Robinson | 2 | WG | 2 | Leianne Tufuga |
| Isabelle Kelly | 3 | CE | 3 | Mele Hufanga |
| Tiana Penitani | 4 | CE | 4 | Abigail Roache |
| Jakiya Whitfeld | 5 | WG | 5 | Shanice Parker |
| Ali Brigginshaw (c) | 6 | SO/FE | 6 | Gayle Broughton |
| Tarryn Aiken | 7 | SH/HB | 7 | Tyla King |
| Millie Elliott | 8 | PR | 8 | Brianna Clark |
| Olivia Higgins | 9 | HK | 9 | Brooke Anderson |
| Shannon Mato | 10 | PF | 16 | Alexis Tauaneai |
| Kezie Apps (c) | 11 | SR | 11 | Annessa Biddle |
| Yasmin Clydsdale | 12 | SR | 12 | Amber Hall |
| Simaima Taufa | 13 | LF/LK | 13 | Georgia Hale (c) |
| Keeley Davis | 14 | IN | 10 | Angelina Teakaraanga-Katoa |
| Sarah Togatuki | 15 | IN | 14 | Ashleigh Quinlan |
| Keilee Joseph | 16 | IN | 15 | Najvada George |
| Jessica Sergis | 18 | IN | 17 | Otesa Pule |
| Jessika Elliston | 19 | CS | 18 | Tiana Davison |
| Brad Donald | | Coach | | Ricky Henry |

== Women's Pacific Bowl ==
The 2024 Women's Pacific Bowl acted as the Asia-Pacific qualification tournament for the 2026 Women's Rugby League World Cup with all Pacific Cup teams having already qualified. First place team qualified directly for the tournament, whereas the second place qualified for the Inter-confederation playoffs which they will have to win to qualify for the World Cup.

The fixtures were arranged on 30 August based on the IRL Women's World Rankings.

=== Brackets ===
Semi-finals
14 | Tonga | 16
24 | Samoa | 30
6 | Cook Islands | 6
26 | Fiji | 18

Final
Samoa | 16
Fiji | 12

=== Fixtures ===
==== Semi-finals ====
19 October 2024
18:00 FJT (UTC+12:00)

| Tonga | 16–30 | Samoa |
|---|---|---|
| Tries: 3 Hanisi 21'; Takapautolo 34'; Tauhalaliku 41'; Goals: 2 Paki 2/3 23', 42' | 1st: 10–20; 2nd: 6–10; Report | Tries: 5 Masaga 1', 31'; Lofipo 9'; Patea 28', 54'; Tui 65'; Goals: 3 Piliae-Rasabale 3/6 7 pen', 11', 56' |

National Stadium, Suva
Attendance: 3,271
Referee: Todd Smith (Australia)
Senior Review Official: Chris Butler (Australia)
Touch judges: Chris Sutton (Australia)

Team details
| Tonga | | Position | Samoa |
| Name | Number | Position | Number | Name |
|---|---|---|---|---|
| Anaseini Malupo | 1 | FB | 1 | Evania Pelite |
| Maatuleio Fotu-Moala | 2 | WG | 2 | Mercedez Taulelei-Siala |
| Litia Fusi | 3 | CE | 3 | Lindsay Tui |
| Kate Fallon | 4 | CE | 4 | Sarina Masaga |
| Lavinia Tauhalaliku | 5 | WG | 5 | Jessica Patea |
| Emmanita Paki | 6 | SO/FE | 6 | Tavarna Papalii |
| Cassey Tohi-Hiku | 7 | SH/HB | 7 | Pauline Piliae-Rasabale |
| Kalosipani Hopoate | 8 | PR | 8 | Annetta Nu'uausala (c) |
| Jade Fonua | 9 | HK | 9 | Destiny Brill |
| Tegan Dymock | 10 | PF | 10 | Laikha Clarke |
| Manilita Takapautolo | 11 | SR | 11 | Monalisa Soliola |
| Vanessa Foliaki (c) | 12 | SR | 12 | Christian Pio |
| Natasha Penitani | 13 | LF/LK | 13 | Sienna Lofipo |
| Filomina Hanisi | 15 | IN | 14 | Jetaya Faifua |
| Dannii Perese | 16 | IN | 15 | Simone Karpani |
| Paea Uilou | 17 | IN | 17 | Pihuka Berryman-Duff |
| Seli Mailangi | 19 | IN | 18 | Evah McEwen |
| Tatiana Finau | 14 | CS | 16 | Jasmine Fogavini |
| Kelvin Wright | | Coach | | Jamie Soward |

26 October 2024
18:00 FJT (UTC+12:00)

| Fiji | 18–6 | Cook Islands |
|---|---|---|
| Tries: 4 Naikore 21', 39', 60'; Holmes 17'; Goals: 1 Naikore 18'; Naitokatoka 0/1; Lutu 0/1 | 1st: 10–6; 2nd: 8–0; Report | Tries: 1 Matua 9'; Goals: 1 Poko 1/1 10' |

National Stadium, Suva
Attendance: 3,216
Referee: Peter Gough (Australia)
Senior Review Official: Wyatt Raymond (Australia)
Touch judges: Drew Oultram (Australia)

Team details
| Fiji | | Position | Cook Islands |
| Name | Number | Position | Number | Name |
|---|---|---|---|---|
| Cassie Staples | 1 | FB | 1 | Kiana Takairangi (c) |
| Vitalina Naikore | 4 | WG | 2 | Chantelle Holloway-Samuels |
| Sienna Laing | 3 | CE | 3 | Tyler Birch |
| Taina Naividi | 6 | CE | 4 | Kaiyah Atai |
| Abigayle Sekitoga | 19 | WG | 5 | Kiarah Siauane |
| Luisa Yaranamua | 17 | SO/FE | 6 | Charntay Poko |
| Losana Lutu | 7 | SH/HB | 7 | Lydia Turua-Quedley |
| Ilisapeci Bari | 2 | PR | 8 | Crystal Tamarua |
| Sereana Naitokatoka | 9 | HK | 9 | Chelsea Makira |
| Aliti Namoce | 15 | PF | 10 | April Ngatupuna |
| Nanise Vakacavu | 11 | SR | 11 | Jazmon Tupou-Witchman |
| Latisha Smythe | 12 | SR | 12 | Kerehitina Matua |
| Talei Holmes (c) | 18 | LF/LK | 13 | Anneka Stephens |
| Anastasia Shum-Cottrell | 14 | IN | 14 | Jodeci Joseph |
| Mere Kilawekana | 20 | IN | 15 | Lavinia Kitai |
| Ema Rainima | 21 | IN | 18 | Tahleisha Maeva |
| Teaghan Hartigan | 25 | IN | 19 | Ryvrr-Lee Alo |
| Asenaca Diranuve | 10 | CS | 21 | Chazmin Holloway-Samuels |
| Josaia Dakuitoga | | Coach | | Rusty Matua |

==== Final ====
2 November 2024
17:35 NZDT (UTC+13:00)

| Samoa | 16–12 | Fiji |
|---|---|---|
| Tries: 3 Patea 18'; Nu'uausala 56', 67'; Goals: 2 Piliae-Rasabale 2/3 57', 69' | 1st: 4–12; 2nd: 12–0 | Tries: 2 Laing 30'; Sekitoga 35'; Goals: 2 Naikore 2/2 32', 35' |

Mount Smart Stadium, Auckland
Attendance: TBA
Referee: Belinda Sharpe (Australia)
Senior Review Official: Liam Kennedy (Australia)
Touch judges: Drew Oultram (Australia)

Team details
| Samoa | | Position | Fiji |
| Name | Number | Position | Number | Name |
|---|---|---|---|---|
| Evania Pelite | 1 | FB | 1 | Cassie Staples |
| Mercedez Taulelei-Siala | 2 | WG | 4 | Vitalina Naikore |
| Lindsay Tui | 3 | CE | 3 | Sienna Laing |
| Sarina Masaga | 4 | CE | 6 | Taina Naividi |
| Jessica Patea | 5 | WG | 19 | Abigayle Sekitoga |
| Tavarna Papalii | 6 | SO/FE | 17 | Luisa Yaranamua |
| Pauline Piliae-Rasabale | 7 | SH/HB | 5 | Losana Lutu |
| Annetta Nu'uausala (c) | 8 | PR | 2 | Ilisapeci Bari |
| Destiny Brill | 9 | HK | 9 | Sereana Naitokatoka |
| Evah McEwen | 17 | PF | 12 | Latisha Smythe |
| Monalisa Soliola | 11 | SR | 11 | Nanise Vakacavu |
| Christian Pio | 12 | SR | 25 | Teaghan Hartigan |
| Sienna Lofipo | 13 | LF/LK | 18 | Talei Holmes (c) |
| Laikha Clarke | 10 | IN | 8 | Sereana Maragi |
| Jetaya Faifua | 14 | IN | 14 | Anastasia Shum-Cottrell |
| Simone Karpani | 15 | IN | 20 | Mere Kilawekana |
| Pihuka Berryman-Duff | 16 | IN | 21 | Rory Muller |
| Jasmine Fogavini | 16 | CS | 15 | Ema Rainima |
| Jamie Soward | | Coach | | Josaia Dakuitoga |

The winner of the Women's Pacific Bowl Final played the third-placed team from the Women's Pacific Cup to determine promotion and relegation for the next edition of the tournament.

==== Women's promotion/relegation playoff ====
10 November 2024
11:35 AEDT (UTC+11:00)

| Papua New Guinea | 12–34 | Samoa |
|---|---|---|
| Tries: 2 Albert 47', 61'; Goals: 2 Veivers 2/2 48', 62' | 1st: 0–16; 2nd: 12–18; Report | Tries: 6 Taulelei-Siala 5'; Fogavini 18', 44'; Faifua 32'; Tui 40'; Patea 64'; Goals: 5 Piliae-Rasabale 4/5 19', 33', 45', 65' |

Western Sydney Stadium, Sydney
Attendance: TBA
Referee: Karra-Lee Nolan (Australia)
Video Referee: Wyatt Raymond (Australia)

Team details
| Papua New Guinea | | Position | Samoa |
| Name | Number | Position | Number | Name |
|---|---|---|---|---|
| Shae Yvonne De La Cruz | 1 | FB | 14 | Jetaya Faifua |
| Jenny Wesley | 4 | WG | 2 | Mercedez Taulelei-Siala |
| Belinda Gwasamun | 3 | CE | 3 | Lindsay Tui |
| Leila Kerowa | 11 | CE | 4 | Sarina Masaga |
| Lyiannah Allen | 5 | WG | 5 | Jessica Patea |
| Sera Koroi | 6 | SO/FE | 6 | Tavarna Papalii |
| Ua Ravu | 7 | SH/HB | 7 | Pauline Piliae-Rasabale |
| Elsie Albert (c) | 8 | PR | 8 | Annetta Nu'uausala (c) |
| Emily Veivers | 12 | HK | 12 | Sienna Lofipo |
| Essay Banu | 10 | PF | 15 | Simone Karpani |
| Sareka Mooka | 11 | SR | 11 | Monalisa Soliola |
| Jessikah Reeves | 15 | SR | 17 | Evah McEwen |
| Gloria Kaupa | 13 | LF/LK | 12 | Christian Pio |
| Therese Aiton | 9 | IN | 16 | Pihuka Berryman-Duff |
| Delailah Ahose | 14 | IN | 18 | Jasmine Fogavini |
| Yolanda Taute | 16 | IN | 20 | Viena Tinao |
| Mala Mark | 17 | IN | 21 | Ella-Jaye Harisson-Leaunoa |
| Talitha Kunjil | 18 | CS | 23 | Claudia Brown |
| Tahnee Norris | | Coach | | Jamie Soward |

== Wheelchair games ==
Announced on 30 September, Australia and New Zealand contested a two match test series on 1 and 4 November to coincide with the Pacific Championships. Both matches were played in Auckland.

1 November 2024
10:30 AM (NZDT) UTC+13:00

| New Zealand | 4–98 | Australia |
|---|---|---|
| Tries: 1 Jamie Tapp; Goals: 0 | 1st: 0–42; 2nd: 4–56; Report | Tries: 17; Bayley McKenna 5 Daniel Anstey 5 Cory Cannane 3 Zac Schumacher 2 Peter Arbuckle; Brad Grove; Goals: 15; Bayley McKenna 12; Dian Karim 3 |

Eventfinda Stadium, Auckland
Player of the Match: Bayley McKenna (Australia)

4 November 2024

| New Zealand | 8–110 | Australia |
|---|---|---|
| Tries: 2 Ryan Charles; Jamie Tapp; Goals: 0 | 1st: 0–66; 2nd: 8–44; Report | Tries: 21; Daniel Anstey 5 Bayley McKenna 4 Brad Grove 4 Cory Cannane 2 Zac Schumacher 2 Toby Popple 2 Diab Karim 2 Goals: 13; Zac Schumacher 7 Bayley McKenna 4 Daniel Anstey; Toby Popple |

Eventfinda Stadium, Auckland
Player of the Match: Zac Schumacher (Australia)

== Physical disability game ==
On 2 November 2024, New Zealand and Australia PDRL teams played at Mount Smart Stadium in Auckland as a curtain-raiser to the women's Pacific Bowl final and men's Pacific Cup match.

2 November 2024
3:25 PM (NZDT) UTC+13:00

| New Zealand | 20–18 | Australia |
|---|---|---|
| | Report |

Mount Smart Stadium, Auckland

== Other matches ==
A residents match between Fiji and Samoa was played as a curtain raiser to the week two men's and women's Pacific Bowl games.

26 October 2024
15:30 FJT (UTC+12:00)

| Fiji Residents | 22–10 | Samoa Residents |

National Stadium, Suva

== Broadcasting ==
=== Networks ===
| Region | Broadcaster | Ref. |
|---|---|---|
| Australia | Nine Network and Fox League | |
| New Zealand | Sky Sport | |
| United Kingdom | Sky Sports Mix | |

=== Viewing figures ===
Approximately 6.2 million watch the men's tournament across all games showing a 40% increase from 2023; with the final attracting around 1 million television viewers, a 79% increase from 2023. The Pacific Bowl saw an average tournament increase of 35%. The women's tournament saw 1.4 million viewers across all matches with 353k watching the final. The Women's Bowl saw an 18% increase in television viewers.
