= 2023 Rugby League Pacific Championships =

- Number of teams: 6 (men); 7 (women)
- Host countries: Australia; New Zealand; Papua New Guinea
- Winner: Cup: New Zealand; Bowl: Papua New Guinea
- Attendance: 118,986 (14,873 per game day)
- Points scored: 551
- Tries scored: 101
- Top scorer: (New Zealand) Jamayne Isaako (46)
- Top try scorers: (Papua New Guinea) Nene McDonald (4) (New Zealand) Ronaldo Mulitalo (4) (New Zealand) Jamayne Isaako (4)

The 2023 Rugby League Pacific Championships was the second edition of the Rugby League Pacific Championships and the first under its current name (having previously been called the Oceania Cup in 2019). The championship included a collection of international rugby league tournaments to be played from October to November 2023 between nations located in the Pacific region.

The competition was played in three groupings: the Pacific Cup for higher ranking men's teams, the Pacific Bowl for lower ranking men's teams, and a section of women's matches played throughout.

A total of 101 tries were scored in the 13 full international matches at an average of 7.8 tries per game. There were 67 tries in the eight men's games (average 8.4) and 34 tries in five women's matches (average 6.8). A further ten tries were scored in the men's match between New Zealand A and Tonga A. Top try-scorer honours were shared by three men's players: Nene McDonald, Ronaldo Mulitalo and Jamayne Isaako, with four tries each. The top try-scorers from the women's internationals, with three each, were Abigail Roache and Mele Hufanga.

== Background ==
The Pacific Rugby League Championships was announced August 2023, as part of a $7 million investment by the NRL and Australian Government to develop rugby league in the surrounding countries. The tournament serves a continuation of the Oceania Cup which had one edition in 2019 before the COVID-19 pandemic. The inaugural Pacific Championships would be held across Australia, New Zealand, and Papua New Guinea.

== Teams ==
=== Men's teams ===
Competition	Team	World ranking	Coach	Captain	Ref
Pacific Cup	Australia	1	(Australia) Mal Meninga	James Tedesco	
Pacific Cup	New Zealand	2	(Australia) Michael Maguire	James Fisher-Harris	
Pacific Cup	Samoa	3	(Australia) Ben Gardiner	Junior Paulo	
Pacific Bowl	Cook Islands	13	(Australia) Karmichael Hunt	Brad Takairangi	
Pacific Bowl	Fiji	7	(Fiji) Wise Kativerata	Tui Kamikamica	
Pacific Bowl	Papua New Guinea	6	(Australia) Justin Holbrook	Kyle Laybutt	

=== Women's teams ===
Competition	Team	World ranking	Coach	Captain	Ref
Women	Australia	1	(Australia) Brad Donald	Kezie Apps and Ali Brigginshaw	
Women	Cook Islands	6	(New Zealand) Rusty Matua	Ngatokotoru Arakua	
Women	Fiji	19	(Fiji) Josaia Dakuitoga	Josephine Maejiirs	
Women	New Zealand	2	(New Zealand) Ricky Henry	Georgia Hale and Raecene McGregor	
Women	Papua New Guinea	5	(Australia) Ben Jeffries	Sera Koroi and Belinda Gwasamun (replaced the named but injured Elsie Albert)	
Women	Samoa	20	(Australia) Jamie Soward	Niall Williams Guthrie	
Women	Tonga	16	(New Zealand) Kelvin Wright	Tiana Penitani	

== Venues ==
Host venues
1 Eden Park, Auckland
2 Waikato Stadium, Hamilton
3 Melbourne Rectangular Stadium, Melbourne
4 PNG Football Stadium, Port Moresby
5 North Queensland Stadium, Townsville

Five venues across three countries were selected to host the Championships.

- Auckland, New Zealand: Eden Park hosted three matches on 21 October 2023, including the second Pacific Cup match between New Zealand and Samoa, a women's match between New Zealand and Tonga, and a men's match between New Zealand A and Tonga A.
- Hamilton, New Zealand: Waikato Stadium hosted the Pacific Cup final on 4 November 2023.
- Melbourne, Australia: Melbourne Rectangular Stadium hosted a double-header on 28 October 2023, which featured men's and women's matches between Australia and New Zealand.
- Port Moresby, Papua New Guinea: PNG Football Stadium hosted all four Pacific Bowl matches, including the final, over a four-week period, as well as two women's matches.
- Townsville, Australia: North Queensland Stadium hosted a women's match between Australia and New Zealand and the first Pacific Cup match between Australia and Samoa on 14 October 2023.

== Officiating ==
Referees and side-line officials for week one matches were announced on 10 October 2023. Appointments for week two were announced on 17 October 2023, with several changes of role.

Referees
Grant Atkins
Darian Furner
Peter Gough
Liam Kennedy

Ashley Klein
Wyatt Raymond
Todd Smith
Gerard Sutton

Touch Judges
Phil Henderson
David Munro
Drew Oultram
Paki Parkinson

Ziggy Przeklasa-Adamski
Belinda Sharpe
Chris Sutton

Bunker Review Officials
Chris Butler
Adam Gee

== Pacific Cup ==
=== Standings ===
Pos.	Team	Pld.	W	D	L	PF	PA	Diff.	Pts.	Qualification
1	Australia	2	2	0	0	74	30	+44	4	Advance to Pacific Cup Final
2	New Zealand	2	1	0	1	68	36	+32	2	Advance to Pacific Cup Final
3	Samoa	2	0	0	2	12	88	–76	0	

NB: Tonga were intended to participate but had already arranged a tour of England before the tournament was announced.

=== Fixtures ===
14 October 2023
19:10 AEST (UTC+10:00)

Australia	38–12	Samoa
Tries: Haas 4'; Tedesco 9'; Fa'asuamaleaui 12'; Murray 15'; Tabuai-Fidow (2) 39', 54'; Staggs 79' c Goals: Staggs (5/7) 5', 13', 17', 40', 80'	1st: 28–6; 2nd: 10–6; Report	Tries: Taulagi 18'; Leilua 72'; Goals: Crichton (2/2) 20', 74'

North Queensland Stadium, Townsville
Attendance: 18,144
Referee: Grant Atkins (Australia)
Video Referee: Ashley Klein (Australia)
Touch judges: Phil Henderson (Australia), Wyatt Raymond (Australia)

Team details
Australia		Position	Samoa
Name	Number	Position	Number	Name
James Tedesco	1	FB	1	Sualauvi Faalogo
Dylan Edwards	2	WG	2	Murray Taulagi
Hamiso Tabuai-Fidow	3	CE	3	Izack Tago
Kotoni Staggs	4	CE	4	Young Tonumaipea
Selwyn Cobbo	5	WG	5	Brian To'o
Cameron Munster	6	SO/FE	6	Stephen Crichton
Daly Cherry-Evans	7	SH/HB	7	Daejarn Asi
Payne Haas	8	PR	8	Stefano Utoikamanu
Ben Hunt	9	HK	19	Justin Matamua
Tino Fa'asuamaleaui	10	PF	10	Junior Paulo
Cameron Murray	11	SR	11	Luciano Leilua
Liam Martin	12	SR	12	Connelly Lemuelu
Isaah Yeo	13	LF/LK	13	Keenan Palasia
Harry Grant	14	IN	9	Gordon Chan Kum Tong
Lindsay Collins	15	IN	14	Spencer Leniu
Patrick Carrigan	16	IN	15	Terrell May
Reuben Cotter	17	IN	16	Heilum Luki
Nicho Hynes	18	RES	18	Royce Hunt
Mal Meninga		Coach		Ben Gardiner

21 October 2023
18:00 NZDT (UTC+13:00)

New Zealand	50–0	Samoa
Tries: Isaako (2) 13', 24'; Hughes 22'; Asofa-Solomona 44'; Papali'i 48'; Mulitalo (2) 60', 73'; Nikora 63' c Fisher-Harris 76'; Goals: Isaako (7/9) 14', 23', 26', 45', 65', 75', 78'	1st: 18–0; 2nd: 32–0; Report

Eden Park, Auckland
Attendance: 23,269
Referee: Gerard Sutton (Australia)
Touch judges: Dave Munro (Australia), Chris Sutton (Australia)

Team details
New Zealand		Position	Samoa
Name	Number	Position	Number	Name
Charnze Nicoll-Klokstad	1	FB	1	Sualauvi Faalogo
Ronaldo Mulitalo	2	WG	2	Murray Taulagi
Matthew Timoko	3	CE	4	Marion Seve
Joseph Manu	4	CE	21	Tommy Talau
Jamayne Isaako	5	WG	20	Greg Marzhew
Dylan Brown	6	SO/FE	6	Stephen Crichton
Jahrome Hughes	7	SH/HB	7	Daejarn Asi
James Fisher-Harris	8	PR	8	Stefano Utoikamanu
Kieran Foran	14	HK	9	Gordon Chan Kum Tong
Moses Leota	10	PF	10	Junior Paulo
Isaiah Papali'i	11	SR	11	Luciano Leilua
Briton Nikora	12	SR	16	Heilum Luki
Joseph Tapine	13	LF/LK	14	Spencer Leniu
Fa'amanu Brown	9	IN	13	Keenan Palasia
Nelson Asofa-Solomona	15	IN	15	Terrell May
Griffin Neame	16	IN	18	Royce Hunt
Leo Thompson	17	IN	19	Ronald Volkman
Naufahu Whyte	18	RES	17	Justin Matamua
Michael Maguire		Coach		Ben Gardiner

28 October 2023
20:10 AEDT (UTC+11:00)

Australia	36–18	New Zealand
Tries: Holmes 8'; Collins (2) 21', 30'; Edwards 50'; Hunt 77'; Murray 79'; Goals: Holmes (6/7) 9', 22', 31', 51', 65', 78'	1st: 18–12; 2nd: 18–6; Report	Tries: Nikora 17'; Mulitalo 38'; Brown 69'; Goals: Isaako (3/3) 19', 39', 71'

Melbourne Rectangular Stadium, Melbourne
Attendance: 20,584
Referee: Adam Gee (Australia)
Touch judges: Ziggy Przeklasa-Adamski (Australia), Drew Oultram (Australia)

Team details
Australia		Position	New Zealand
Name	Number	Position	Number	Name
James Tedesco	1	FB	1	Charnze Nicoll-Klokstad
Dylan Edwards	2	WG	2	Ronaldo Mulitalo
Hamiso Tabuai-Fidow	3	CE	3	Matthew Timoko
Kotoni Staggs	4	CE	4	Joseph Manu
Valentine Holmes	5	WG	5	Jamayne Isaako
Cameron Munster	6	SO/FE	6	Dylan Brown
Daly Cherry-Evans	7	SH/HB	7	Jahrome Hughes
Jake Trbojevic	8	PR	8	James Fisher-Harris
Ben Hunt	9	HK	9	Kieran Foran
Thomas Flegler	10	PF	10	Moses Leota
Cameron Murray	11	SR	11	Isaiah Papali'i
Reuben Cotter	12	SR	12	Briton Nikora
Isaah Yeo	13	LF/LK	13	Joseph Tapine
Harry Grant	14	IN	14	Fa'amanu Brown
Lindsay Collins	15	IN	15	Nelson Asofa-Solomona
Patrick Carrigan	16	IN	16	Griffin Neame
Nicho Hynes	17	IN	17	Leo Thompson
Liam Martin	18	RES	18	Naufahu Whyte
Mal Meninga		Coach		Michael Maguire

Final

4 November 2023
17:00 NZDT (UTC+13:00)

Australia	0–30	New Zealand
	1st: 0–12; 2nd: 0–18; Report	Tries: Mulitalo 14'; Isaako (2) 34', 47'; Timoko 59'; Neame 70'; Goals: Isaako (4/5) 16', 35', 61', 72'; Field goals: Isaako (1/1) 67'

FMG Stadium Waikato, Hamilton
Attendance: 13,269
Referee: Adam Gee (Australia)
Touch judges: Dave Munro (Australia), Chris Sutton (Australia)

Team details
Australia		Position	New Zealand
Name	Number	Position	Number	Name
James Tedesco	1	FB	1	Charnze Nicoll-Klokstad
Dylan Edwards	2	WG	2	Ronaldo Mulitalo
Hamiso Tabuai-Fidow	3	CE	3	Matthew Timoko
Kotoni Staggs	4	CE	4	Joseph Manu
Valentine Holmes	5	WG	5	Jamayne Isaako
Cameron Munster	6	SO/FE	6	Dylan Brown
Daly Cherry-Evans	7	SH/HB	7	Jahrome Hughes
Payne Haas	8	PR	8	James Fisher-Harris
Ben Hunt	9	HK	9	Kieran Foran
Tino Fa'asuamaleaui	10	PF	10	Moses Leota
Liam Martin	12	SR	11	Isaiah Papali'i
Reuben Cotter	17	SR	12	Briton Nikora
Isaah Yeo	13	LF/LK	13	Joseph Tapine
Harry Grant	14	IN	14	Fa'amanu Brown
Lindsay Collins	15	IN	15	Nelson Asofa-Solomona
Patrick Carrigan	16	IN	16	Griffin Neame
Nicho Hynes	18	IN	17	Leo Thompson
Thomas Flegler	19	RES	18	Naufahu Whyte
Mal Meninga		Coach		Michael Maguire

== Pacific Bowl ==
=== Standings ===
Pos.	Team	Pld.	W	D	L	PF	PA	Diff.	Pts.	Qualification
1	Fiji	2	2	0	0	65	34	+31	4	Advance to Pacific Bowl Final
2	Papua New Guinea	2	1	0	1	62	53	+9	2	Advance to Pacific Bowl Final
3	Cook Islands	2	0	0	2	28	68	–40	0	

=== Fixtures ===
15 October 2023
15:00 PNGST (UTC+10:00)

Papua New Guinea	46–10	Cook Islands
Tries: Z. Laybutt 7', 39'; Derby 12'; Kapinias 15'; Richard 22'; Macdonald 26', 41', 42', 76'; Goals: Z. Laybutt (5/9) 14', 16', 23', 41', 44'	1st: 30–0; 2nd: 16–10; Report	Tries: E. Ioka 48'; S. Marsters 58'; Goals: E. Ioka (1/1) 60'; Takairangi (0/1)

PNG Football Stadium, Port Moresby
Attendance: 7,133
Referee: Peter Gough (Australia)
Video Referee: Chris Butler (Australia)
Touch judges: Ziggy Przeklasa-Adamski (Australia), Drew Oultram (Australia)

Team details
Papua New Guinea		Position	Cook Islands
Name	Number	Position	Number	Name
Alex Johnston	1	FB	1	Esom Ioka
Robert Derby	2	WG	2	Malachi Morgan
Zac Laybutt	3	CE	3	Kayal Iro
Rodrick Tai	4	CE	4	Esan Marsters
Nene Macdonald	5	WG	5	Steven Marsters
Kyle Laybutt	6	SO/FE	6	Brad Takairangi
Lachlan Lam	7	SH/HB	7	Tevin Arona
Epel Kapinias	8	PR	8	Davy Moale
Judah Rimbu	9	HK	9	Rua Ngatikaura
Valentine Richard	10	PF	10	Makahesi Makatoa
Jacob Alick	11	SR	11	Zane Tetevano
Dan Russell	12	SR	12	Reuben Porter
Jack De Belin	13	LF/LK	13	Pride Petterson-Robati
Liam Horne	14	IN	15	Rhys Dakin
Nixon Putt	15	IN	16	Justin Estall-Makirere
Junior Rop	16	IN	17	Kadiyae Ioka
Benji Kot	17	IN	18	Takai Mokohar
Cruise Ten	18	RES	14	William Samuel

22 October 2023
15:00 PNGST (UTC+10:00)

Fiji	22–18	Cook Islands
Tries: Sivo 24'; Bula 55'; Blake 67'; Turuva 74'; Goals: Wakeham (3/4) 56', 68', 75'	1st: 4–6; 2nd: 18–12; Report	Tries: E. Marsters 18'; E. Ioka 46'; Cooper-Tetevano 71'; Goals: S. Marsters (3/3) 19', 47', 72'

PNG Football Stadium, Port Moresby
Attendance: 7,001
Referee: Ashley Klein (Australia)
Touch judges: Liam Kennedy (Australia), Todd Smith (Australia)

Team details
Fiji		Position	Cook Islands
Name	Number	Position	Number	Name
Jahream Bula	1	FB	1	Esom Ioka
Maika Sivo	2	WG	2	Malachi Morgan
Sunia Turuva	3	CE	3	Kayal Iro
Waqa Blake	4	CE	4	Alvin Maungaati
Mikaele Ravalawa	5	WG	5	Steven Marsters
Kurt Donoghoe	6	SO/FE	6	Brad Takairangi
Brandon Wakeham	7	SH/HB	7	Esan Marsters
Tui Kamikamica	8	PR	8	Davvy Moale
Noah Nailagoliva	14	HK	9	Rua Ngatikaura
Gordon Whippy	16	PF	17	Takai Mokohar
Kitione Kautoga	11	SR	11	Zane Tetevano
Taane Milne	13	SR	12	Reuben Porter
Caleb Navale	15	LF/LK	13	Pride Petterson-Robati
Penioni Tagituimua	9	IN	10	William Samuel
Apisalome Saukuru	12	IN	14	Kadiyae Ioka
Watisoni Waqanisaravi	17	IN	15	Rhys Dakin
Sirilo Lovokuro	20	IN	16	Justin Estall-Makirere
Pio Seci	21	RES

29 October 2023
15:00 PNGST (UTC+10:00)

Papua New Guinea	16–43	Fiji
Tries: Johnston 2'; Kot 61'; Kapinias 72'; Goals: Martin (2/3) 62', 73'	1st: 4–19; 2nd: 12–24; Report	Tries: Donoghoe (2) 12', 32'; Kamikamica 17'; Sivo (2) 46', 48'; Navale 55'; Qareqare 65'; Goals: Wakeham (7/8) 13', 18', 33', 48', 57', 66', 69'; Field goals: Wakeham (1/1) 39'

PNG Football Stadium, Port Moresby
Attendance: 14,546
Referee: Ashley Klein (Australia)
Touch judges: Peter Gough (Australia), Phil Henderson (Australia)

Team details
Papua New Guinea		Position	Fiji
Name	Number	Position	Number	Name
Alex Johnston	1	FB	1	Jahream Bula
Robert Derby	2	WG	2	Maika Sivo
Zac Laybutt	3	CE	4	Waqa Blake
Benji Kot	4	CE	5	Mikaele Ravalawa
Nene Macdonald	5	WG	18	Jason Qareqare
Kyle Laybutt	6	SO/FE	6	Kurt Donoghoe
Lachlan Lam	7	SH/HB	7	Brandon Wakeham
Epel Kapinias	8	PR	8	Tui Kamikamica
Edwin Ipape	9	HK	9	Penioni Tagituimua
Valentine Richard	10	PF	10	King Vuniyayawa
Rhyse Martin	11	SR	12	Apisalome Saukuru
Daniel Russell	12	SR	13	Taane Milne
Jack de Belin	13	LF/LK	15	Caleb Navale
Judah Rimbu	14	IN	14	Noah Nailagoliva
Wellington Albert	15	IN	16	Gordon Whippy
Keven Appo	16	IN	19	Mesake Ravonu
Jacob Alick	17	IN	20	Sirilo Lovokuro
Liam Horne	18	RES	21	Pio Seci
Justin Holbrook		Coach		Waisake Kativerata

Final

5 November 2023
15:00 PNGST (UTC+10:00)

Fiji	12–32	Papua New Guinea
Tries: Blake (2) 42', 68'; Goals: Wakeham (2/2) 42', 69'	1st: 0–26; 2nd: 12–6; Report	Tries: Ipape 15'; Derby (2) 23', 28'; Johnston 38'; Kapinias 75'; Goals: Martin (5/5) 16', 25', 29', 39', 77'

PNG Football Stadium, Port Moresby
Attendance: 14,809
Referee: Grant Atkins (Australia)
Touch judges: Liam Kennedy (Australia), Todd Smith (Australia)

Team details
Fiji		Position	Papua New Guinea
Name	Number	Position	Number	Name
Jahream Bula	1	FB	1	Alex Johnston
Maika Sivo	2	WG	2	Robert Derby
Waqa Blake	4	CE	3	Zac Laybutt
Mikaele Ravalawa	5	CE	4	Rodrick Tai
Jason Qareqare	18	WG	5	Nene Macdonald
Kurt Donoghoe	6	SO/FE	6	Kyle Laybutt
Brandon Wakeham	7	SH/HB	7	Lachlan Lam
Tui Kamikamica	8	PR	8	Epel Kapinias
Penioni Tagituimua	9	HK	9	Edwin Ipape
King Vuniyayawa	10	PF	10	Valentine Richard
Apisalome Saukuru	12	SR	11	Rhyse Martin
Taane Milne	13	SR	12	Daniel Russell
Caleb Navale	15	LF/LK	13	Jack de Belin
Kitione Kautoga	11	IN	14	Judah Rimbu
Gordon Whippy	16	IN	15	Liam Horne
Watisoni Waqanisaravi	17	IN	16	Junior Rop
Pio Seci	21	IN	17	Nixon Putt
Sirilo Lovokuro	20	RES	18	Jacob Alick
Waisake Kativerata		Coach		Justin Holbrook

== Women's games ==
A number of women's game were played alongside the men's tournament. The Women's Pacific Championships were inaugurated in 2024.

=== Fixtures ===
14 October 2023
17:00 AEST (UTC+10:00)

Australia	16–10	New Zealand
Tries: Upton (2) 4', 31'; Johnston 25'; Goals: Brigginshaw (2/3) 5', 26'	Report	Tries: Biddle 12'; Hufanga 43'; Goals: McGregor (1/2) 44'

North Queensland Stadium, Townsville
Attendance: 12,067
Referee: Todd Smith (Australia)
Video Referee: Ashley Klein (Australia)
Touch judges: Belinda Sharpe (Australia), Darian Furner (Australia)

Team details
Australia		Position	New Zealand
Name	Number	Position	Number	Name
Tamika Upton	1	FB	1	Apii Nicholls
Jaime Chapman	2	WG	2	Annessa Biddle
Jessica Sergis	3	CE	3	Shanice Parker
Isabelle Kelly	4	CE	4	Mele Hufanga
Julia Robinson	5	WG	5	Leianne Tufuga
Tarryn Aiken	6	SO/FE	6	Ashleigh Quinlan
Ali Brigginshaw	7	SH/HB	7	Raecene McGregor
Shannon Mato	8	PR	8	Mya Hill-Moana
Keeley Davis	9	HK	9	Brooke Anderson
Jessika Elliston	10	PF	10	Angelina Teakaraanga-Katoa
Kezie Apps	11	SR	11	Otesa Pule
Olivia Kernick	12	SR	12	Laishon Albert-Jones
Simaima Taufa	13	LF/LK	13	Georgia Hale
Emma Tonegato	14	IN	14	Tyla Nathan-Wong
Caitlan Johnston	15	IN	15	Najvada George
Kennedy Cherrington	16	IN	16	Jasmine Fogavini
Lauren Brown	18	IN	17	Amelia Pasikala
Shaylee Bent	17	RES	18	Abigail Roache

15 October 2023
12:45 AEST (UTC+10:00)

Samoa	26–12	Fiji
Tries: Tui (2) 10', 42'; Mapusua (2) 21', 68'; Nu'uausala 31'; Goals: Piliae-Rasabale (3/5) 22', 32', 70'	Report	Tries: Naikore 5', 54'; Namoce 57'

PNG Football Stadium, Port Moresby
Referee: Liam Kennedy (Australia)
Video Referee: Chris Butler (Australia)
Touch judges: David Munro (Australia), Chris Sutton (Australia)

Team details
Samoa		Position	Fiji
Name	Number	Position	Number	Name
Destiny Mino-Sinapati	1	FB	1	Cassie Staples
Taylor Mapusua	2	WG	2	Vitalina Naikore
Petesa Lio	3	CE	3	Merewalesi Rokouno
Niall Williams-Guthrie	4	CE	4	Patricia Raikadroka
Lindsay Tui	5	WG	5	Asena Rokomaram
Pauline Piliae-Rasabale	6	SO/FE	6	Sienna Laing
Sienna Lofipo	7	SH/HB	7	Sereana Naitokatoka
Fiona Jahnke	8	PR	8	Aliti Namoce
Destiny Brill	9	HK	9	Teaghan Laing
Janelle Williams	10	PF	10	Anastacia Shum-Cottrell
Malaela Sua	12	SR	11	Talei Holmes
Onjeurlina Hunt	15	SR	12	Emma Rainima
Annetta-Claudia Nu'uasala	13	LF/LK	13	Josephine Maejiirs
Pihuka Berryman-Duff	16	IN	14	Siniva Sa'anga
Tafao Asaua	18	IN	15	Grace Waqa
Tamerah Leati	19	IN	16	Mere Kilawekana
Makayla Eli	21	IN	17	Adi Sokula Waqa
Sauleone Saipele	17	RES	18	Alesi Kilawekana

21 October 2023
15:45 NZDT (UTC+13:00)

New Zealand	28–10	Tonga
Tries: Roache (3) 5', 10', 46'; Pasikala 38'; Hufanga 58'; Goals: McGregor (2/6) 12', 40'	Report	Tries: Penitani (2) 25', 55'; Goals: Hifo (1/2) 27'

Eden Park, Auckland
Attendance: ≈10,000
Referee: Wyatt Raymond (Australia)

Team details
New Zealand		Position	Tonga
Name	Number	Position	Number	Name
Shanice Parker	1	FB	1	Langi Vaeinu
Cheyelle Robins-Reti	2	WG	2	Lavinia Tauhalaliku
Mele Hufanga	3	CE	3	China Polata
Abigail Roache	4	CE	4	Litia Fusi
Leianne Tufuga	5	WG	5	Haylee Hifo
Tyla Nathan-Wong	6	SO/FE	6	Cassey Tohi-Hiku
Raecene McGregor	7	SH/HB	7	Tiana Penitani
Mya Hill-Moana	8	PR	8	Folau Vaki
Brooke Anderson	9	HK	14	Jade Fonua
Angelina Teakaraanga-Katoa	10	PF	10	Tegan Dymock
Otesa Pule	11	SR	11	Amelia Mafi
Annessa Biddle	12	SR	12	Vanessa Foliaki
Georgia Hale	13	LF/LK	13	Dannii Perese
Capri Paekau	14	IN	9	Seli Mailangi
Najvada George	15	IN	15	Natasha Penitani
Amelia Pasikala	16	IN	16	Ilaisaane Taufa
Tiana Davison	17	IN	17	Shannon Muru
Jasmine Fogavini	18	RES	18	Fatafehi Hanisi

22 October 2023
12:45 AEST (UTC+10:00)

Papua New Guinea	28–20	Cook Islands
Tries: Kapo 9'; Banu 18'; Allan (2) 22', 48'; Kerowa 34'; Norris 44'; Goals: Veivers (2/6) 10', 20'	Report	Tries: Makira 14'; Rewi 26'; Takairangi 58'; Holloway-Samuels 63'; Goals: Kiria-Ratu (2/4) 16', 65'

PNG Football Stadium, Port Moresby
Attendance: 7,001
Referee: Belinda Sharpe (Australia)

Team details
Papua New Guinea		Position	Cook Islands
Name	Number	Position	Number	Name
Latoniya Norris	1	FB	1	Kiana Takairangi
Lyiannah Allan	2	WG	2	Alesha Willcox
Belinda Gwasamum	3	CE	3	Kaiyah Atai
Shellie Long	4	CE	4	Chantelle Holloway-Samuels
Freda Waula	5	WG	5	Mahinaarangi Rewi
Sera Koroi	6	SO/FE	6	Chantay Kiria-Ratu
Ua Ravu	7	SH/HB	7	Lydia Turua-Quedley
Gloria Kaupa	10	PR	8	Ngatokotoru Arakua
Roswita Kapo	9	HK	9	Chelsea Makira
Jessikah Reeves	13	PF	10	Crystal Tamarua
Emily Vievers	11	SR	11	Jazmon Tupou-Witchman
Essay Banu	12	SR	14	Kerehitina Matua
Bertshiba Awoi	16	LF/LK	13	Anneka Stephens
Meli Joe	14	IN	12	Ariel Ngatoko
Sareka Mooka	15	IN	15	Paulina Morris-Ponga
Yolanda Taute	17	IN	16	Lavinia Kitai
Leila Kerowa	19	IN	17	Jodeci Joseph
Lancy Ulkambane	18	RES	18	Kiana Sword-Tua

28 October 2023
18:00 AEDT (UTC+11:00)

Australia	6–12	New Zealand
Tries: Chapman 9'; Goals: Brown (1/1) 10'	Report	Tries: Hufanga 34'; Tufuga 62'; Goals: McGregor (2/2) 35', 64'

Melbourne Rectangular Stadium, Melbourne
Attendance: 10,536
Referee: Belinda Sharpe (Australia)

Team details
Australia		Position	New Zealand
Name	Number	Position	Number	Name
Tamika Upton	1	FB	1	Apii Nicholls
Jaime Chapman	2	WG	2	Leianne Tufuga
Jessica Sergis	3	CE	3	Mele Hufanga
Isabelle Kelly	4	CE	4	Abigail Roache
Jakiya Whitfeld	5	WG	5	Shanice Parker
Tarryn Aiken	6	SO/FE	6	Tyla Nathan-Wong
Ali Brigginshaw	7	SH/HB	7	Raecene McGregor
Shannon Mato	8	PR	10	Angelina Teakaraanga-Katoa
Lauren Brown	9	HK	9	Brooke Anderson
Kezie Apps	11	PF	15	Najvada George
Olivia Kernick	12	SR	11	Annessa Biddle
Yasmin Clydsdale	15	SR	12	Otesa Pule
Simaima Taufa	13	LF/LK	13	Georgia Hale
Jessika Elliston	10	IN	8	Mya Hill-Moana
Emma Tonegato	14	IN	14	Ashleigh Quinlan
Kennedy Cherrington	16	IN	16	Jasmine Fogavini
Emma Manzelmann	17	IN	17	Tiana Davison
Shaylee Bent	18	RES	18	Laishon Albert-Jones

== Other matches ==
21 October 2023

New Zealand A	36–26	Tonga A
Tries: Warbrick 2, Howarth, Kini, Roache, Leiataua; Goals: Tuaupiki 6	Report (NZRL)	Tries: Koloamatangi-Kalepo, Finefeuiaki, Foketi, Francis; Goals: Teaupa 3

Eden Park, Auckland

== Attendance ==
The combined attendance for the eight game days was 118,986.

- Australia 38,728 for the two double-headers in Townsville (18,144) and Melbourne (20,584).
- New Zealand 36,769 for the triple-header in Auckland (23,269) and men's Cup final in Hamilton (13,500).
- Papua New Guinea 43,489 for the four game days in Port Moresby. Note that the first two of the four attendance figures (7,133, 7,001, 14,546, and 14,809) are as published on the Rugby League Project website.
- The combined attendance total counts attendees of each double-header match, and triple-header in Auckland, just once.
- Average attendance for the eight game days is 14,873.
