= Fa'amanu Brown =

Samoa international rugby league footballer

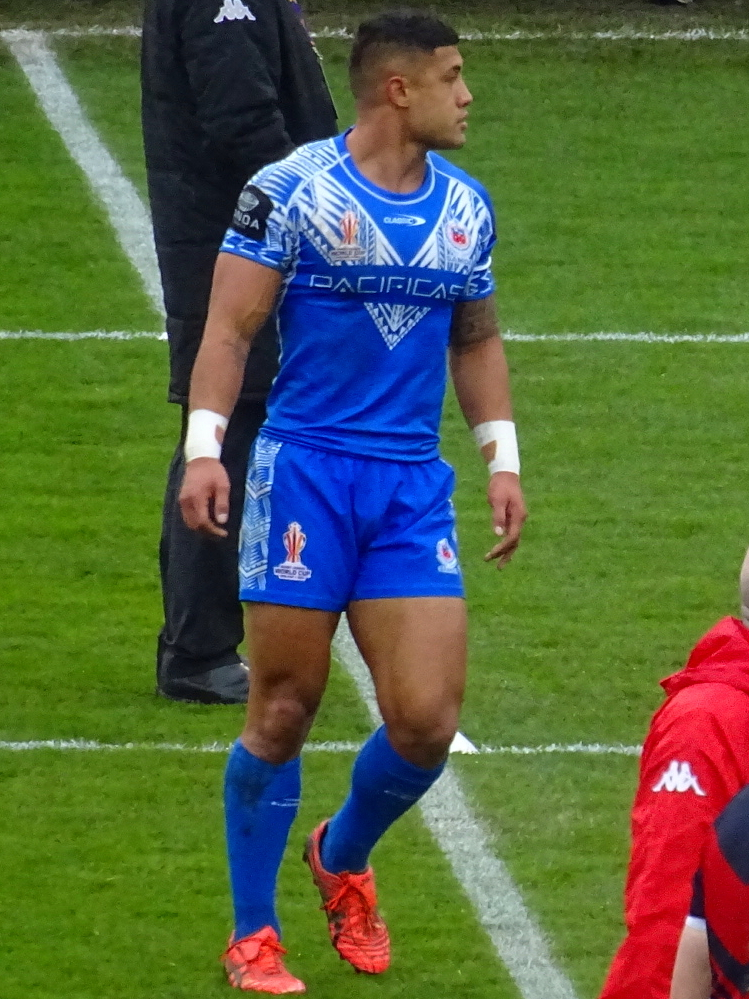

Personal information
- Full name: Fa'amanu Brown
- Born: 24 December 1994 (age 31) Christchurch, New Zealand
- Height: 183 cm (6 ft 0 in)
- Weight: 90 kg (14 st 2 lb)

Playing information
- Position: Halfback, Five-eighth, Hooker
Club
Years	Team	Pld	T	G	FG	P
2014–17	Cronulla Sharks	24	3	0	0	12
2018–19	Canterbury Bulldogs	12	1	0	0	4
2021	Featherstone Rovers	27	17	12	0	92
2022	Wests Tigers	13	6	0	0	24
2023	Canterbury Bulldogs	5	0	0	0	0
2023	Newcastle Knights	2	1	0	0	4
2024	Hull F.C.	8	3	0	0	12
2024	St. George Illawarra	6	0	0	0	0
	Total	97	31	12	0	148
Representative
Years	Team	Pld	T	G	FG	P
2016–22	Samoa	8	1	3	0	10
2023	New Zealand	3	1	0	0	4
- Source: As of 6 July 2024

Fa'amanu Brown (born 24 December 1994) is a former professional rugby league footballer who last played as a hooker for the St. George Illawarra Dragons and has represented Samoa and New Zealand at international level. He played as a halfback, five-eighth and lock earlier in his career.

He previously played for the Cronulla-Sutherland Sharks, Canterbury-Bankstown Bulldogs, Wests Tigers and Newcastle Knights in the NRL, Hull F.C. in the Super League, and Featherstone Rovers in the RFL Championship.

== Background ==
Brown was born in Christchurch, New Zealand. He is of Samoan descent.

Brown played his junior football for the Hornby Panthers before moving to Australia and playing for De La Salle Caringbah. He attended and graduated from Endeavour Sports High School. In 2012, Brown was signed by the Cronulla-Sutherland Sharks and started out in their S. G. Ball Cup team. Brown then played for the Sharks' NYC team from 2012 to 2014. Brown has captained the Sharks' NYC team.

== Playing career ==
=== 2014 ===
On 14 February 2014, Brown was selected for the Cronulla-Sutherland Sharks inaugural 2014 NRL Auckland Nines squad. Brown was selected to play for Samoa against Fiji in the 2014 Pacific Rugby League International test, but withdrew due to injury. On 5 June 2014, Brown re-signed with the Sharks on a 3-year contract, two days before his NRL debut. In Round 13 of the 2014 NRL season, Brown made his debut for the Sharks against the St. George Illawarra Dragons playing at five-eighth in the Sharks 30–0 loss at WIN Stadium. In Round 21 against the Parramatta Eels at Remondis Stadium, Brown scored his first NRL career try in the Sharks 32–12 loss. Brown finished his debut year in the NRL with him playing in 11 matches and scoring a try for the Sharks in the 2014 NRL season. On 9 September 2014, Brown was selected for the New Zealand and Samoa 2014 Four Nations train-on squads, but didn't make the final 24 man squads for both teams.

=== 2015 ===
On 31 January and 1 February, Brown played for the Sharks in the 2015 NRL Auckland Nines. In their Auckland Nines Semi-Final match against the Sydney Roosters, Brown suffered a season ending Anterior cruciate ligament injury, resulting in him not playing in any matches for the Sharks in the 2015 NRL season.

=== 2016 ===
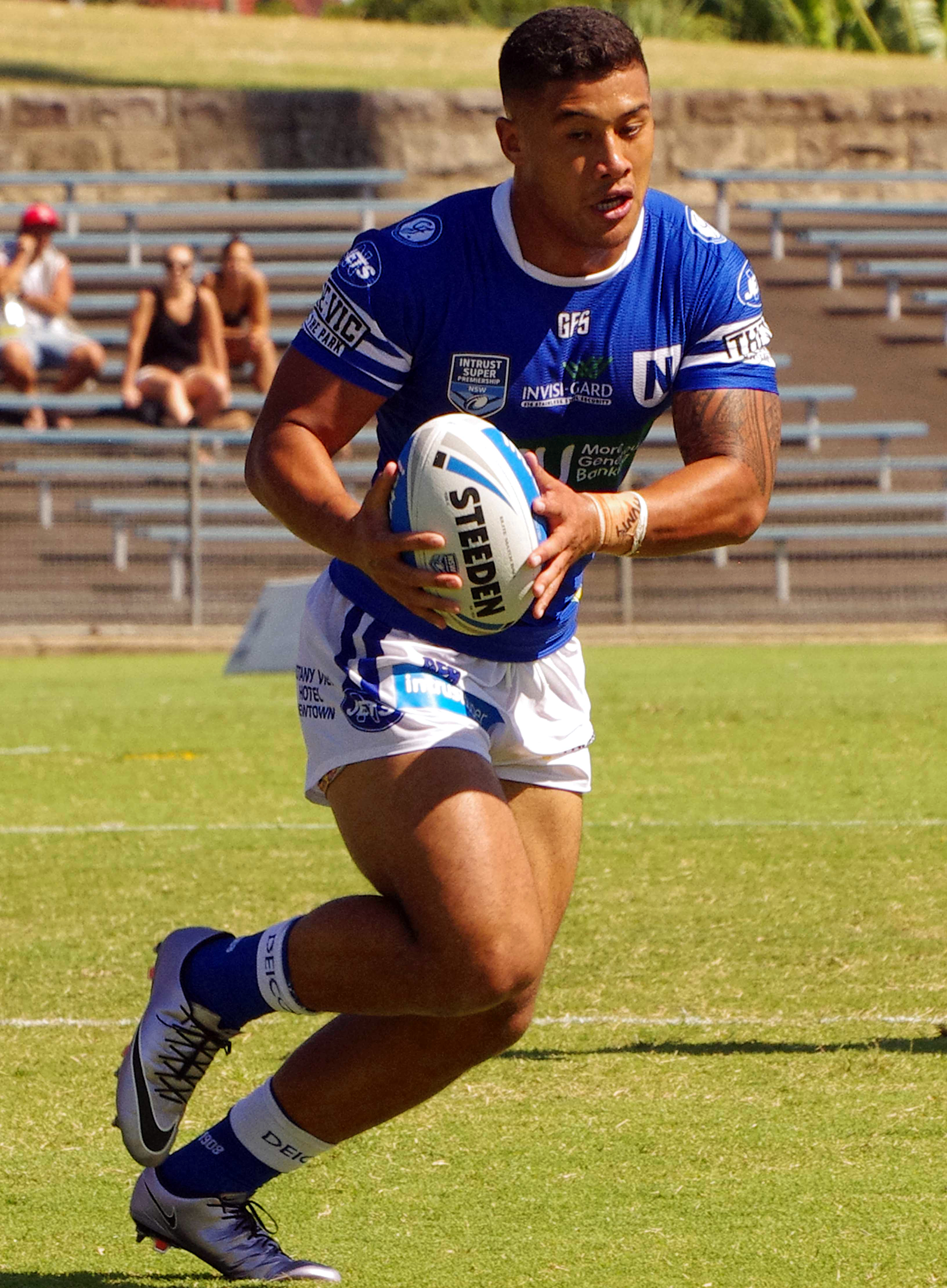
Brown playing for the Newtown Jets in 2016

On 7 May, Brown made his international debut for Samoa against Tonga in the 2016 Polynesian Cup, where he played at five-eighth and kicked 3 goals in a man-of-the-match performance.

Brown spent most of the season with foundation club and feeder side to Cronulla, The Newtown Jets, where he was part of the side that made it to the preliminary final before losing to eventual premiers Illawarra.

=== 2017 ===
On 17 May 2017, Fa'amanu Brown signed a two-year deal with the Canterbury-Bankstown Bulldogs. After waiting almost a year for a chance to be recalled to the side, Brown finally made his NRL return in Cronulla's clash with Canterbury in round 12, with the regular half, James Maloney, unavailable due to State of Origin duties. On 21 July 2017, Brown scored his first try of the season for Cronulla against Souths in a 26–12 victory.

On 28 July 2017, Brown started for Cronulla against the New Zealand Warriors and scored a try, but was later taken from the field after suffering a head collision.

=== 2018 ===
Brown made his debut for Canterbury-Bankstown in Round 3 against the Penrith Panthers.

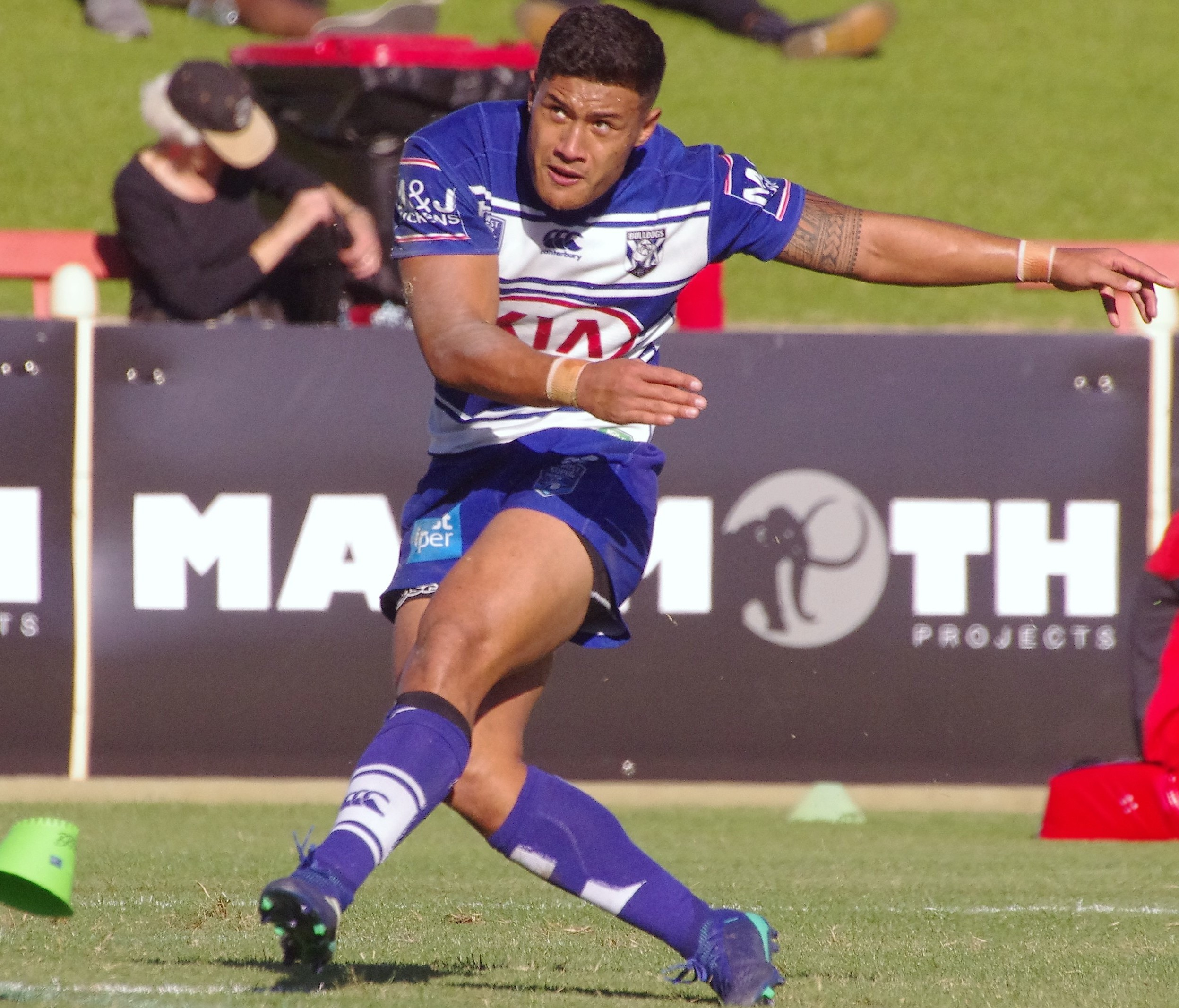
Brown playing for the Canterbury Bulldogs in 2018

Brown made a total of 9 appearances in 2018 as Canterbury spent the entire season down towards the foot of the table. At one stage, the club were running second last on the table before upset wins over the Brisbane Broncos, New Zealand Warriors and St George lifted the club up the table to a 12th place finish.

Brown played in Canterbury's Intrust Super Premiership NSW grand final victory over his former club Newtown at Leichhardt Oval. The following week, Brown played in Canterbury's NRL State Championship side which defeated Redcliffe 42-18 at ANZ Stadium.

=== 2019 ===
Brown only made 3 appearances for Canterbury in the 2019 NRL season. For most of 2019, Brown played for Canterbury's reserve grade team in the Canterbury Cup NSW competition. Brown's last game for the club was the qualifying final against St George which Canterbury lost 24-22 at Campbelltown Stadium.

On September 16, it was revealed that Brown would be released from the club after winning Canterbury Cup player of the year.

=== 2020 ===
On 15 June 2020, it was reported that he had signed for Featherstone Rovers in the RFL Championship.

=== 2021 ===
Brown played for Featherstone in their 2021 Million Pound Game defeat against Toulouse Olympique. On 5 November, Brown signed a contract to join NRL side Wests Tigers for the 2022 season.

=== 2022 ===
On November 5, 2021, it was confirmed Brown had joined the Wests Tigers via his Instagram story. On 20 May, he made his club debut against his former club Canterbury, scoring two tries for Wests in their 36-22 victory at Leichhardt Oval.

Brown played a total of 13 games for the Wests Tigers in the 2022 NRL season as the club claimed the wooden spoon for the first time.

In October Brown was named in the Samoa squad for the 2021 Rugby League World Cup.

=== 2023 ===
In August, Brown joined the Newcastle Knights mid-season on a contract until the end of the 2023 season. Brown made his debut for the Knights in round 26, coming off the interchange bench in Newcastle's 32-6 victory over the Cronulla-Sutherland Sharks, giving them an 8 game winning streak.

On 13 October, it was reported that he had signed for Hull F.C. on a one-year contract for the 2024 season

On 17 Oct 2023 it was reported that he would debut for New Zealand against Samoa in the 2023 Pacific Rugby League Championships

=== 2024 ===
Brown made his club debut for Hull F.C. against arch-rivals Hull Kingston Rovers in round 1 of the 2024 Super League season. Hull F.C. would go on to lose the match 22-0. The following week, Brown was controversially sent off in Hull F.C's loss against Warrington. On the replays that were provided, Brown had accidentally clashed heads with Warrington player Ben Currie but instead of play continuing he was given a red card. On 12 April, Brown departed Hull F.C. with immediate effect. It came the day after Tony Smith was sacked as head coach. Hull F.C. had started the season with only one win from seven games.

On 16 April 2024, it was announced he would joining the St. George Illawarra Dragons on a one-year deal, effective immediately.

On 11 September 2024, it was announced that Brown would depart St. George Illawarra at the end of the season after not being offered a new contract.
