= Lydia Turua-Quedley =

Cook Islands international rugby league footballer

Personal information
- Full name: Lydia Turua-Quedley
- Born: 13 March 1999 (age 27) Auckland, New Zealand
- Height: 163 cm (5 ft 4 in)
- Weight: 66 kg (10 st 6 lb)

Playing information
- Position: Halfback, Hooker
Club
Years	Team	Pld	T	G	FG	P
2025	New Zealand Warriors	11	0	0	0	0
2026–	North Queensland Cowboys	8	0	0	0	0
	Total	19	0	0	0	0
Representative
Years	Team	Pld	T	G	FG	P
2017–24	Cook Islands	5	0	0	0	0
- Source: As of 5 November 2026

Lydia Turua-Quedley (born 13 March 1999) is a New Zealand professional rugby league footballer who currently plays for the North Queensland Cowboys in the NRL Women's Premiership.

== Background ==
Turua-Quedley was born in Auckland and is of Cook Islander descent.

== Playing career ==
=== Early years ===
In 2017, while playing in Victoria for the Altona Roosters, Turua-Quedley represented the Cook Islands at the 2017 Women's Rugby World Cup. In 2018, she played for the Werribee Bears and represented the Combined Affiliated State.

In 2020, she played for the Auckland Storm rugby union team in the Farah Palmer Cup.

In 2023, while playing for the Mt Albert Lions, she represented Cook Islands at the 2023 Rugby League Pacific Championships. In 2024, she moved to the Richmond Roses and again represented the Cook Islands at the 2024 Rugby League Pacific Championships. On 20 December 2024, Turua-Quedley joined the New Zealand Warriors.

=== 2025 ===
In Round 1 of the 2025 NRL Women's season, Turua-Quedley made her NRLW debut for the Warriors in their 30–6 loss to the Sydney Roosters. She played 11 games in her debut season before exiting the club at the end of the season.

=== 2026 ===
Turua-Quedley joined the North Queensland Cowboys for the 2026 season, signing a two-year contract.

In Round 1 of the 2026 NRL Women's season, Turua-Quedley made her debut for the Cowboys in their loss to the Brisbane Broncos.
