= Lavinia Kitai =

Cook Islands international rugby league footballer

Personal information
- Full name: Lavinia Kitai
- Born: 18 August 2004 (age 22) Auckland, New Zealand
- Height: 175 cm (5 ft 9 in)
- Weight: 85 kg (13 st 5 lb; 187 lb)

Playing information
- Position: Prop
Club
Years	Team	Pld	T	G	FG	P
2025	New Zealand Warriors	11	0	0	0	0
2026–	St. George Illawarra Dragons	1	0	0	0	0
	Total	12	0	0	0	0
Representative
Years	Team	Pld	T	G	FG	P
2022–25	Cook Islands	7	0	0	0	0
- Source: As of 31 October 2026

Lavinia Kitai (born 18 August 2004) is a Cook Islands professional rugby league footballer who currently contracted to play for the St. George Illawarra Dragons in the 2026 season of the NRL Women's Premiership. Primarily a Prop, Kitai is a Cook Islands representative.

== Club career ==
=== 2022 to 2024 ===
Recruited from the Parkwood Sharks, Kitai played for the Brisbane Tigers in both the Under 19 (three matches) and open-age QRL Women's Premiership (four matches) in 2022.

Following a transfer to Souths Logan Magpies in 2023, Kitai played four matches for that club in the QRL Women's Premiership.

In 2024, Kitai played seven matches for the Burleigh Bears in the QRL Women's Premiership between March and May, including in a semi-final loss, and then nine matches for the Cronulla Sharks in the NSWRL Women's Premiership between July and September.

=== 2025 ===
Katai was signed by the New Zealand Warriors in December 2024 ahead of their return to the NRLW in the 2025 NRL Women's season. Katai made her NRLW debut in Round 1.

=== 2026 ===
Kitai signed with the St. George Illawarra Dragons on a three-year deal in October 2025.

== Representative ==
=== Pathways ===
In 2021, Kitai was selected to play for the Queensland City Under 17 team in an early October match against a Queensland Country team. In June 2022, Kitai played for the Queensland Rubys Under 19 in the National Championships. Following the tournament, Kitai was selected for and played in the Queensland Under 19 team.

=== International ===
Kita was selected in the Cook Islands squad for the postponed 2021 Women's Rugby League World Cup held in October-November 2022. Her first appearance for the Cook Islands was against the England Knights, in which both teams played extended benches.

Kitai made her senior international debut for the Cook Islands in as a starting edge forward against the Australian Jillaroos in the opening round at LNER Community Stadium in York. The Cook Islands lost 74–0 to the eventual tournament winners. Katai also played in the second round loss to New Zealand and third and final round win over France.

Kitai played in the Cook Islands' single matches in the 2023 and 2024 Pacific Championships. Playing in both matches as the Cook Islands won the Women's Pacific Bowl in the 2025 tournament, Katai made her seventh consecutive appearance for her international team.
