= Haylee Hifo =

Tonga international rugby league footballer (born 2004)

Personal information
- Full name: Haylee Hifo
- Born: 28 September 2002 (age 24) Sydney, New South Wales, Australia
- Height: 169 cm (5 ft 7 in)
- Weight: 68 kg (10 st 10 lb)

Playing information
- Position: Wing
Club
Years	Team	Pld	T	G	FG	P
2026–	Nth Qld Cowboys	2	1	0	0	4
Representative
Years	Team	Pld	T	G	FG	P
2022–23	Tonga	2	1	2	0	8
- Source: As of 1 November 2026

Haylee Hifo (born 28 September 2002) is an Australian professional rugby league footballer who currently plays for the North Queensland Cowboys in the NRL Women's Premiership.

She previously played for the Western Force in the Super W.

== Background ==
Hifo was born in Sydney and is of Tongan descent. She attended The Hills Sports High School and played her junior rugby league for St Christophers.

== Playing career ==
=== Early years ===
In 2019, Hifo played for the St George Dragons in the Tarsha Gale Cup. In 2020 and 2021, she played for the Canterbury-Bankstown Bulldogs in the competition.

In 2022 and 2023, Hifo moved up to the NSWRL Women's Premiership, playing for Mounties RLFC. On 25 June 2022, she made her debut for Tonga in their mid-season Test loss to New Zealand, scoring a try and kicking two goals. In 2023, she represented Tonga at the Pacific Championships, playing in their Round 2 loss to New Zealand.

In 2024, after playing for the Joondalup Giants in the NRL WA, Hifo switched to rugby union, where she played two seasons for the Western Force in the Super W. Following the 2025 Super W season, Hifo made a mid-season return to rugby league, playing for the Mackay Cutters in the QRL Women's Premiership.

=== 2026 ===
On 30 April, Hifo signed a two-year contract with the North Queensland Cowboys.

In Round 2 of the 2026 NRL Women's season, Hifo made her NRLW debut, scoring a try in the Cowboys' loss to the Wests Tigers.
