= Steven Marsters =

Cook Islands international rugby league footballer

Steve Marsters
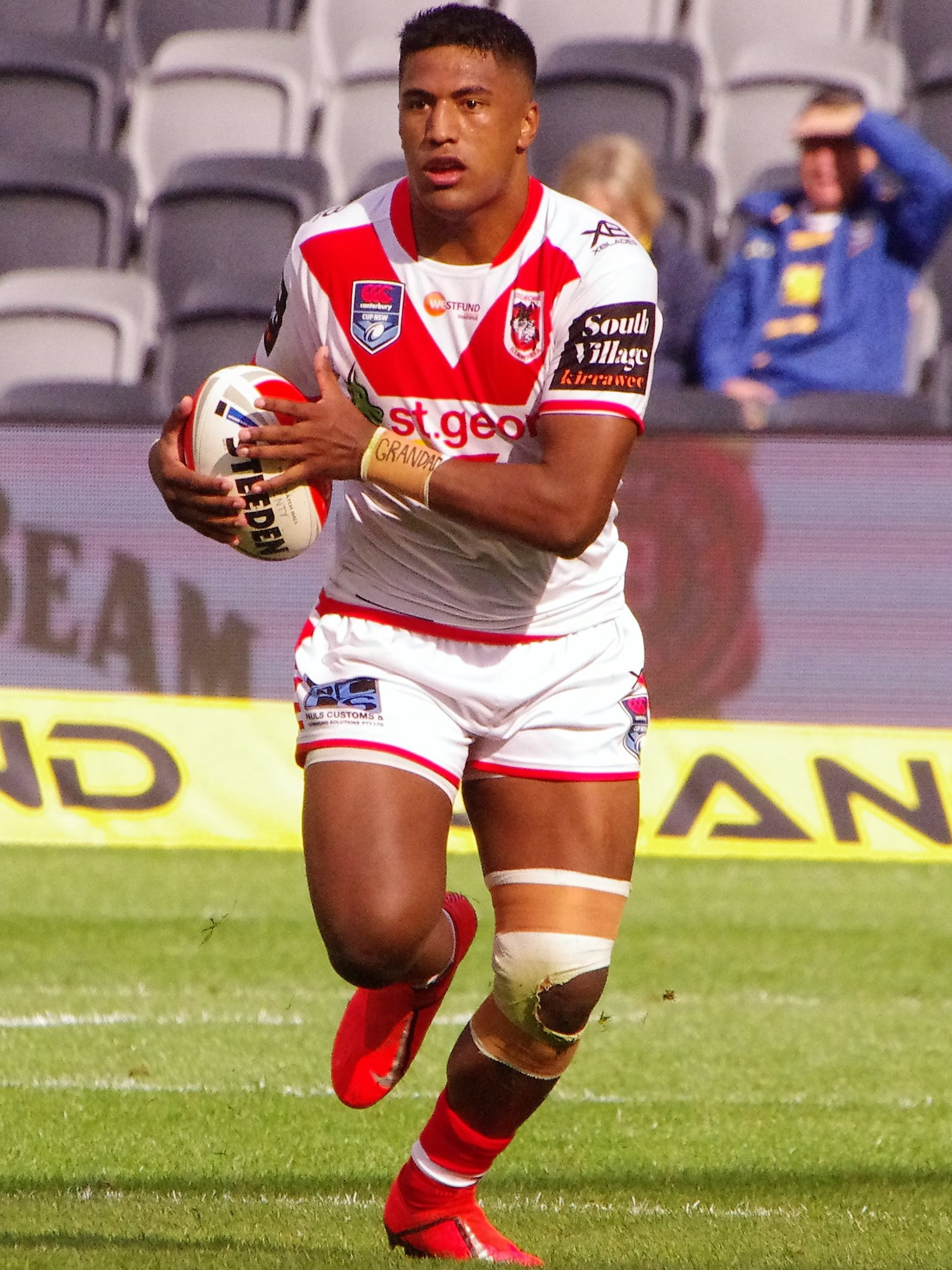

Personal information
- Born: 19 October 1999 (age 25); Auckland, New Zealand
- Height: 183 cm (6 ft 0 in)
- Weight: 99 kg (15 st 8 lb)

Playing information
- Position: Centre, Wing
Club
Years	Team	Pld	T	G	FG	P
2020–21	South Sydney	6	1	0	0	4
Representative
Years	Team	Pld	T	G	FG	P
2019–	Cook Islands	8	4	24	0	64
- Source: As of 7 November 2022
- Relatives: Esan Marsters (cousin)

Steven Marsters (born 19 October 1999) is a Cook Islands international rugby league footballer who plays for the Mudgee Dragons as a centre or winger in the Western Premiership.

== Background ==
Marsters is the younger cousin of current Salford Red Devils and former West Tigers, North Queensland Cowboys, Gold Coast Titans and Huddersfield Giants player, Esan Marsters who has also represented the Cook Islands and New Zealand. He played his junior rugby league with the Thirroul Butchers and Mt Wellington Warriors and has represented the Cook Islands.

== Career ==
=== 2020 ===
Marsters made his first grade debut in round 15 of the 2020 NRL season for South Sydney against Manly-Warringah, scoring a try in a 56–16 victory at ANZ Stadium.

=== 2021 ===
In round 9 of the 2021 NRL season, he made his first start of the year for South Sydney in a 50–0 loss against Melbourne at Stadium Australia.

On 8 October, Marsters was released by the South Sydney club.

=== 2022 ===
In the opening round of the 2021 Rugby League World Cup, Marsters scored a try in the Cook Islands victory over Wales but was taken from the field late in the second half with a knee injury.

=== 2023 ===
In the Cook Islands's first game of the 2023 Rugby League Pacific Championships, Marsters scored a try in the 58th minute but couldn't stop a 36 point loss to the Papua New Guinea national rugby league team.
