= Lindsay Collins =

Australia international rugby league footballer

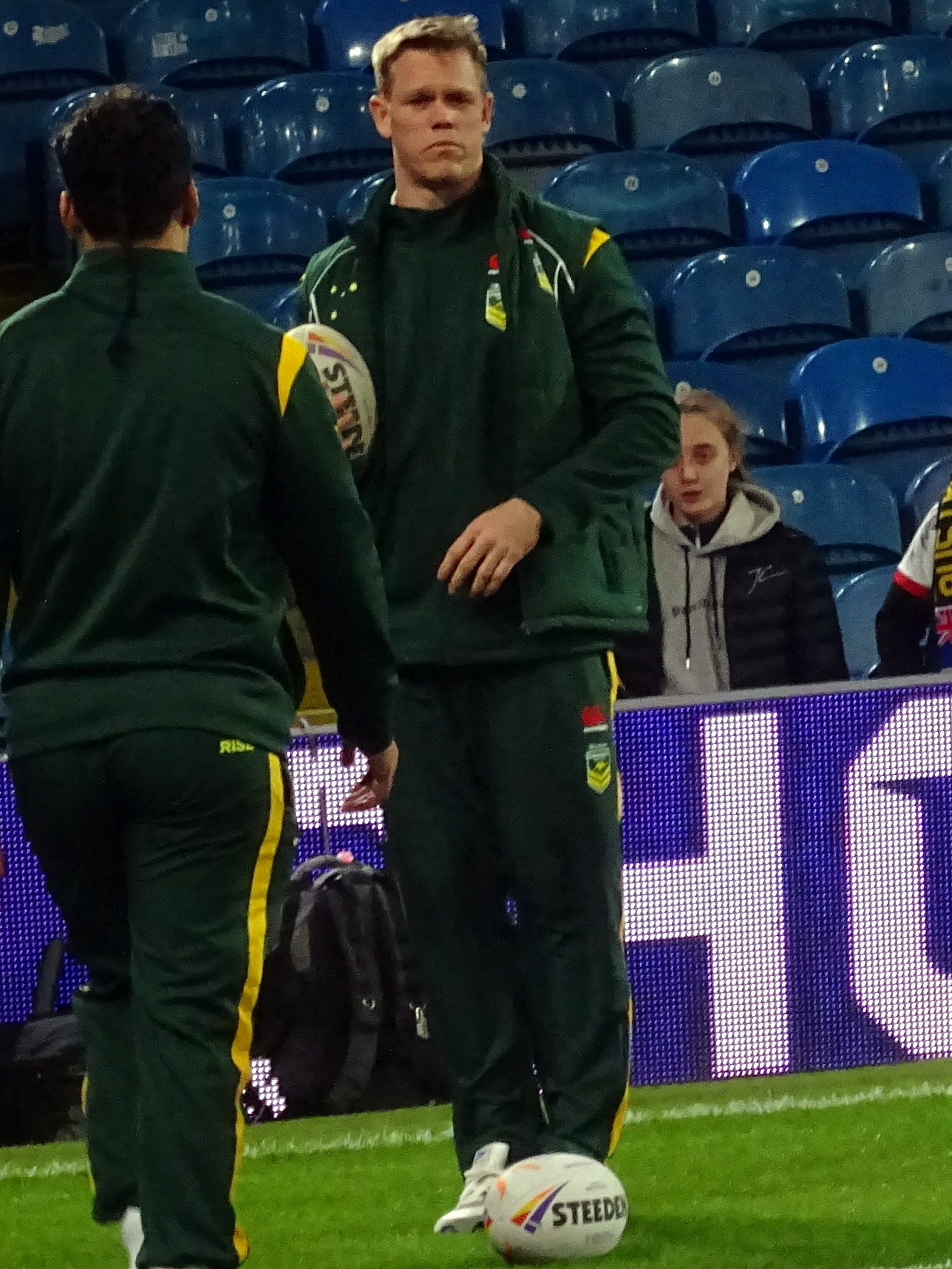

Personal information
- Born: 17 April 1996 (age 30) Brisbane, Queensland, Australia
- Height: 194 cm 6.4 ft
- Weight: 106 kg (16 st 10 lb)

Playing information
- Position: Prop
Club
| Years | Team | Pld | T | G | FG | P |
|---|---|---|---|---|---|---|
| 2017– | Sydney Roosters | 150 | 13 | 0 | 0 | 52 |
Representative
| Years | Team | Pld | T | G | FG | P |
| 2017 | NSW Residents | 1 | 0 | 0 | 0 | 0 |
| 2020–26 | Queensland | 17 | 1 | 0 | 0 | 4 |
| 2022–26 | Australia | 12 | 4 | 0 | 0 | 16 |
- Source: As of 22 November 2026
- Relatives: Lionel Williamson (grandfather)

Lindsay Collins (born 17 April 1996) is an Australian professional rugby league footballer who plays as a prop for the Sydney Roosters in the National Rugby League (NRL), Queensland in State of Origin and Australia at international level.

== Background ==
Collins was born in Brisbane, Queensland, Australia.

He attended Padua College Kedron playing rugby union and played junior rugby league for the Brisbane Brothers, before being signed by the Brisbane Broncos. He has a younger brother and sister

Collins is the grandson of Australian international Lionel Williamson.

== Playing career ==
=== Early career ===
From 2014 to 2016, Collins played for the Brisbane Broncos' NYC team. In July 2015, he played for the Queensland under-20s team against the New South Wales under-20s team.

=== 2017 ===
In 2017, Collins joined the Sydney Roosters. In round 12 of the 2017 NRL season, he made his NRL debut for the Roosters against the Canberra Raiders. On 24 September, Collins played for Wyong in their NSW Cup grand final loss against Penrith.

=== 2018 ===
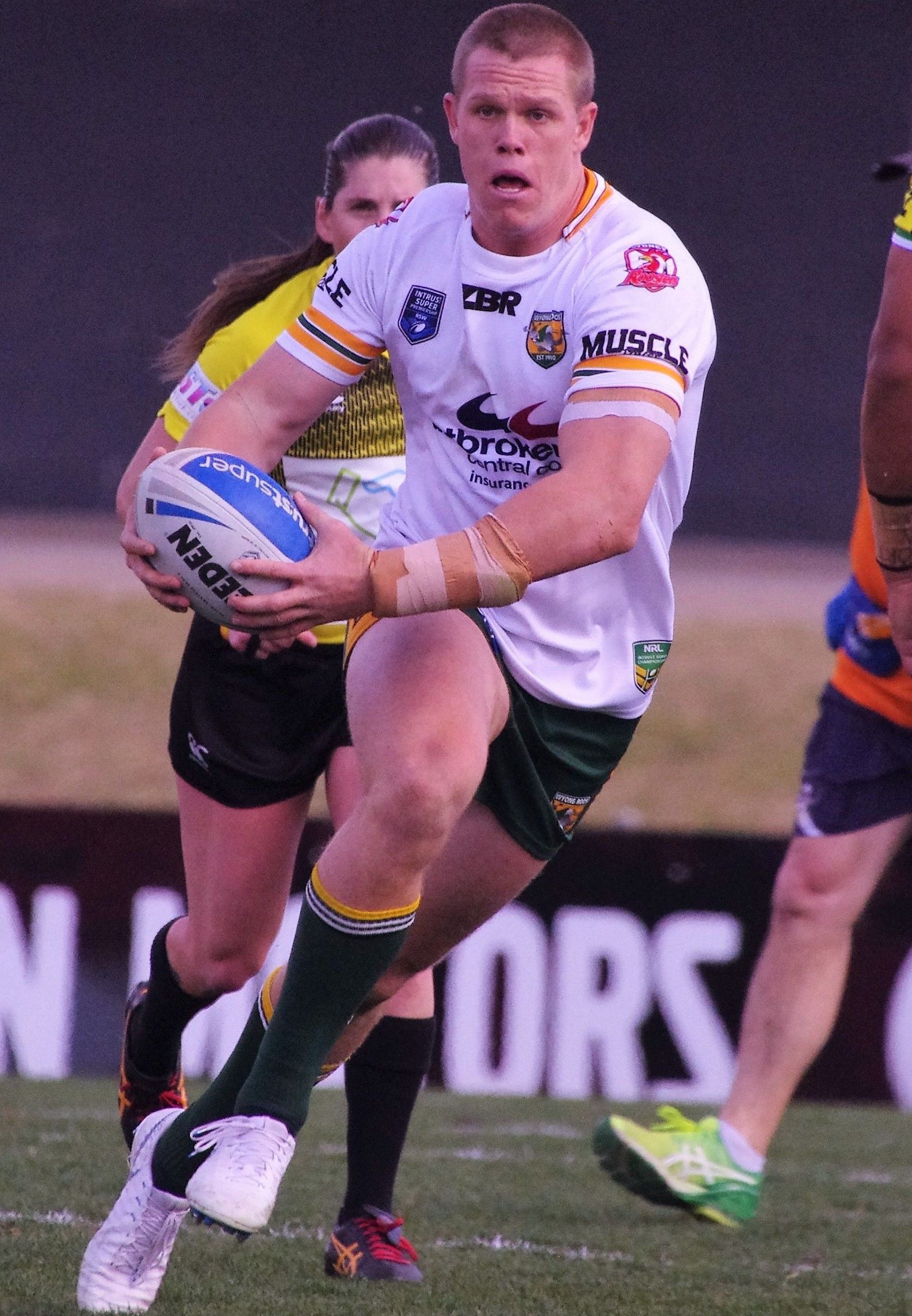
Collins playing for the Wyong Roos in 2018

Collins made 8 appearances for Easts in 2018 including the week one finals victory over Cronulla and the preliminary final victory over Souths but was not included in the victorious grand final side which defeated Melbourne 21-6.

=== 2019 ===
Collins played 14 games for the Sydney Roosters in the 2019 NRL season. He played in the preliminary final victory over Melbourne but was not selected to play in the 2019 NRL Grand Final which the club won over Canberra.

=== 2020 ===
Collins played 19 games for the club in the 2020 NRL season. The club fell short of a third straight premiership losing to Canberra in the elimination final.

Collins's form at the Sydney Roosters was rewarded with an Origin debut for Queensland, where Collins played all 3 games off the bench in a series where Queensland won 2-1.

=== 2021 ===
In round 8 of the 2021 NRL season, Collins was taken from the field in the Sydney Roosters 38-4 victory over Newcastle with a suspected ACL injury.

=== 2022 ===
Collins made 16 appearances for the Sydney Roosters in the 2022 NRL season as the club finished sixth on the table. Collins did not play in the clubs elimination final loss to South Sydney.

In October, he was named in the Australia squad for the 2021 Rugby League World Cup and played three games during the tournament.

=== 2023 ===
On 22 May, Collins was selected by Queensland for all three games of the 2023 State of Origin series, winning man of the match for Queensland's series-deciding game 2 victory.

Collins played 25 matches for the Sydney Roosters in the 2023 NRL season as the club finished 7th on the table and qualified for the finals. Collins played in both of the clubs finals games as they were eliminated in the second week against Melbourne. Collins was named Sydney's player of the year on 20 September, winning the Jack Gibson medal.

Collins was selected in the Australian side for the 2023 Pacific Championships, and scored his first career double in the Kangaroos' win over New Zealand on 28 October.

=== 2024 ===
Collins was named in the front row for Queensland ahead of game one in the 2024 State of Origin series. Collins played 23 games for the Sydney Roosters in the 2024 NRL season as they finished third and qualified for the finals. Collins played in the clubs preliminary final loss against Melbourne.

=== 2025 ===
In May, Collins was selected by Queensland for the 2025 State of Origin series. He played in all three games for Queensland as they upset New South Wales 2-1 to win the series.

Collins played 16 games for the Sydney Roosters in the 2025 NRL season as the club finished 8th on the table and qualified for the finals. Collins played in the clubs elimination final loss against Cronulla.

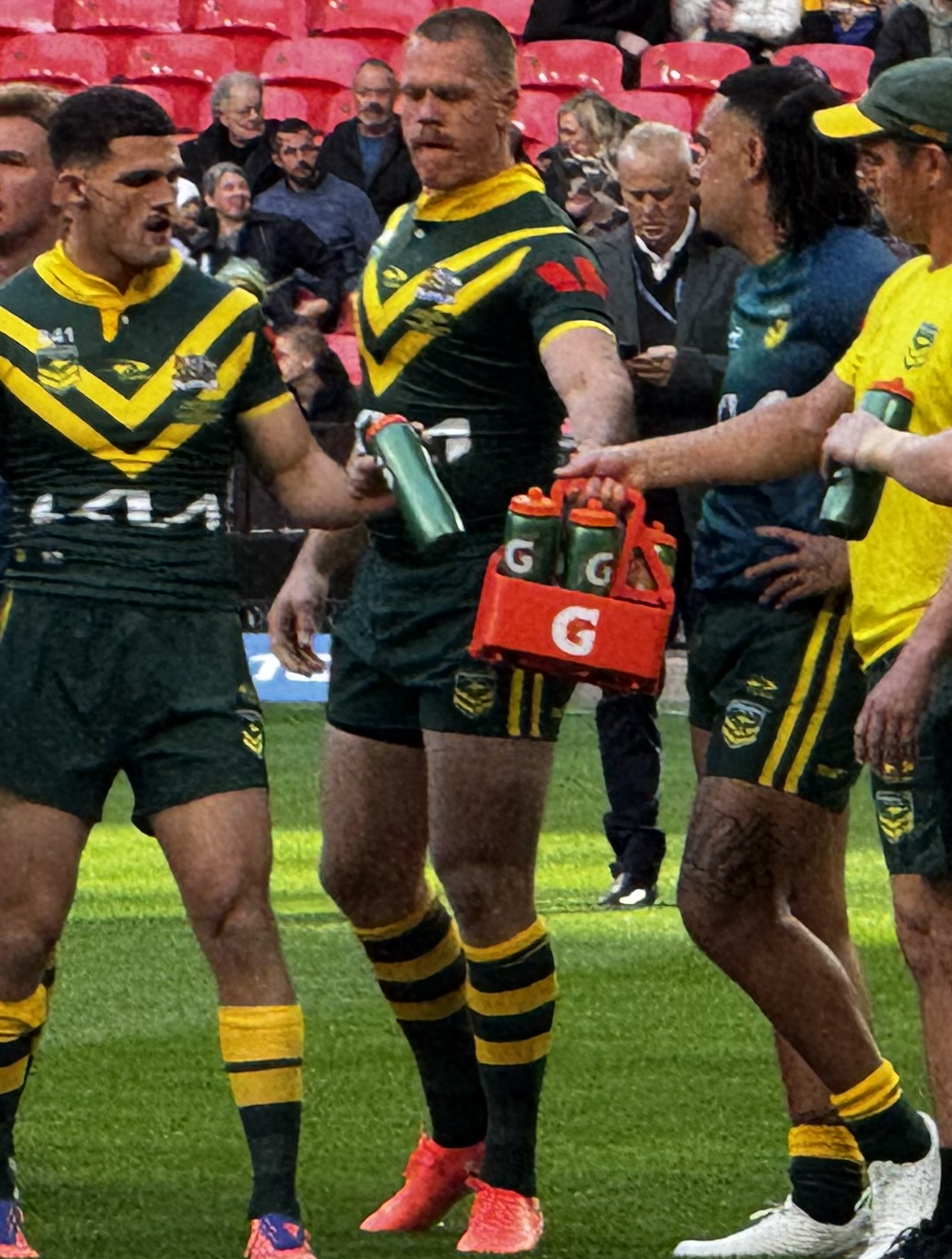
Collins warming up for Australia in 2025

=== 2026 ===
Collins played 21 matches for the Sydney Roosters in the 2026 NRL season including the clubs 2026 NRL Grand Final victory over Newcastle.

== Statistics ==
| Year | Team | Games | Tries | Pts |
|---|---|---|---|---|
| 2017 | Sydney Roosters | 2 | | |
| 2018 | Sydney Roosters | 8 | 1 | 4 |
| 2019 | Sydney Roosters | 14 | | |
| 2020 | Sydney Roosters | 19 | 1 | 4 |
| 2021 | Sydney Roosters | 6 | 1 | 4 |
| 2022 | Sydney Roosters | 16 | | |
| 2023 | Sydney Roosters | 25 | 3 | 12 |
| 2024 | Sydney Roosters | 23 | 1 | 4 |
| 2025 | Sydney Roosters | 16 | 3 | 12 |
| 2026 | Sydney Roosters | 20 | 3 | 12 |
| 2027 | Sydney Roosters | | | |
| | Totals | 150 | 13 | 52 |
