= Sirilo Lovokuro =

Fijian rugby union player

- Born: circa 1965 Taveuni, Fiji
- Died: 26 August 2014 (aged 48–49) Nadroga, Fiji
- Height: 5 ft 9 in (1.75 m)
- Weight: 168 lb (76 kg)
- School: St John's College, Cawaci, Ovalau
- Occupation: Headteacher at Ratu Nemani Memorial School

Rugby union career
- Position(s): Centre, Fly-half
Amateur team(s)
Years	Team	Apps	(Points)
- St John's College, Cawaci
–	St Johns Marist Club Flagstaff, Suva		
Senior career
Years	Team	Apps	(Points)
1986–1990	Suva		
1990–1992	Hino Motors		
International career
Years	Team	Apps	(Points)
1986–1987	Fiji	4	(24)
National sevens team
Years	Team		Comps
1991–1992	Japan		

Sirilo Lovokuro (spelt also as Sirilo Lovokuru; c. 1965 – 26 August 2014) was a Fijian rugby union player. He played as a centre and as fly-half. He was also one of Fiji's first players to turn professional in Japan.

== Career ==
His first international match was against Wales at Suva on 31 May 1986. He was also part of the 1987 Rugby World Cup roster, where he played only the match against New Zealand. After retiring from his player career, he became headteacher of the Ratu Nemani Memorial School. He also played for Japan along with Fijian representative Paulo Nawalu in the 1991 Hong Kong Sevens.

== Death ==
On 26 August 2014, Lovokuro died from a heart attack while preparing his Ratu Nemani Memorial school rugby team in Momi but he had left a mark on parents and landowners in the area.
