= Kurt Donoghoe =

Fiji international rugby league footballer

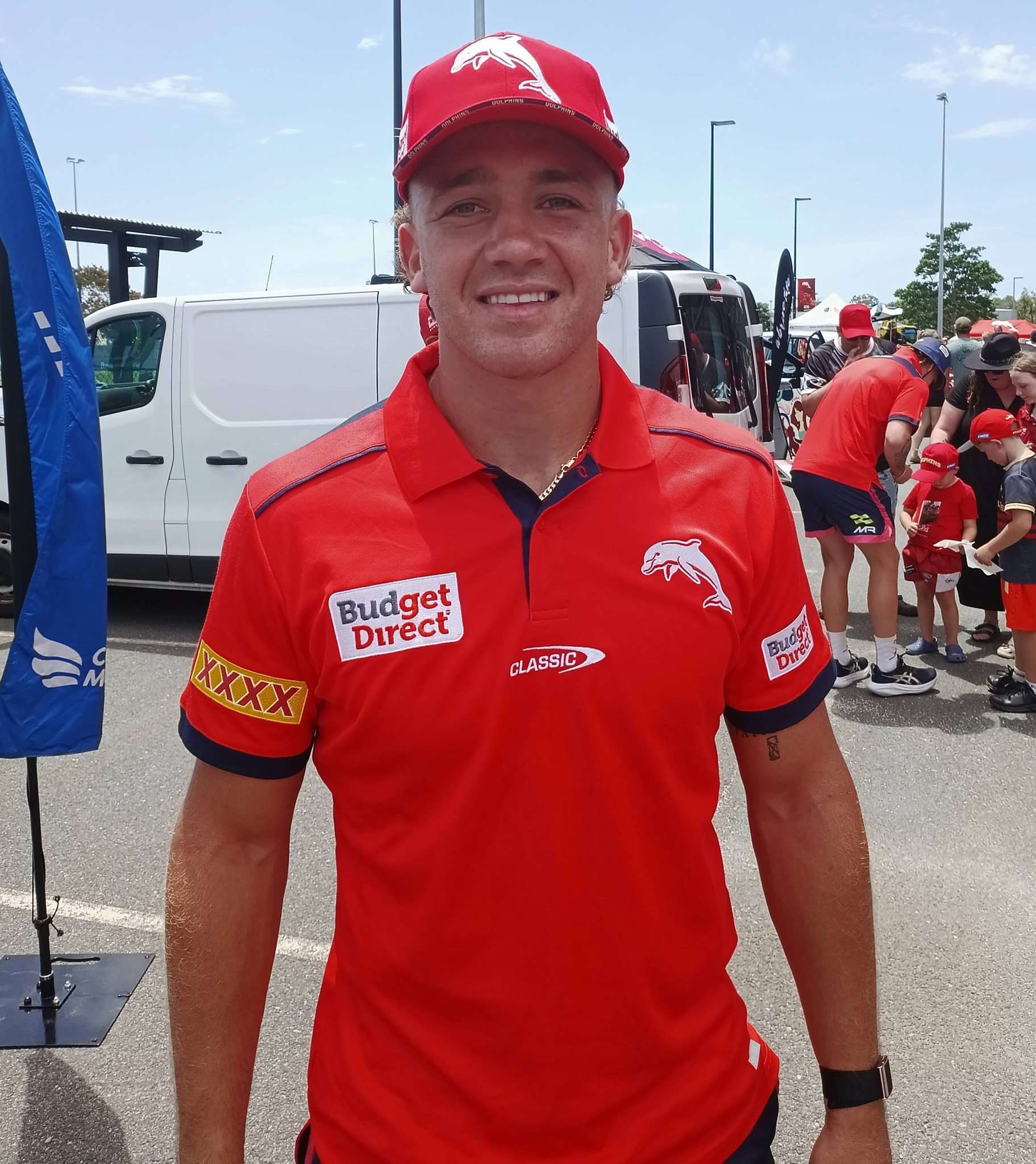

Personal information
- Born: 30 November 2001 (age 24) Newcastle, New South Wales, Australia
- Height: 178 cm (5 ft 10 in)
- Weight: 90 kg (14 st 2 lb)

Playing information
- Position: Hooker, Lock, Five-eighth
Club
Years	Team	Pld	T	G	FG	P
2023–	Dolphins	57	6	0	0	24
Representative
Years	Team	Pld	T	G	FG	P
2023–	Fiji	10	3	0	0	12
- Source: As of 6 November 2026

Kurt Donoghoe (born 30 November 2001) is a Fiji international rugby league footballer who plays as a hooker and five-eighth for the Dolphins in the National Rugby League.

== Background ==
Donoghoe is of Fijian descent and played his junior rugby league for the Central Newcastle Butcher Boys and attended Hunter Sports High School.

== Playing career ==
=== Early career (2018-2022) ===
In 2018, Donoghoe represented Australia Under-18 at the Touch Football World Cup. In 2019, he played for the Newcastle Knights Development Squad in the Laurie Daley Cup. Later that year he played for the Newcastle Knights in the NRL Touch Premiership.

In 2020, Donoghoe played for the Knights in the Jersey Flegg Cup, playing one game before the competition was cancelled. In 2021, he played for the club's New South Wales Cup side. In May 2022, he was named in Fiji's 2022 Rugby League World Cup train-on squad.

In September 2022, he played in the Knights' Jersey Flegg Cup Grand Final loss to the Penrith Panthers.

=== International ===
At the end of the 2023 season, Donoghoe was named in the Fijian squad for the 2023 Pacific Rugby League Championships and scored two tries in their 43–16 win over Papua New Guinea on 29 October.

=== Dolphins (2023) ===
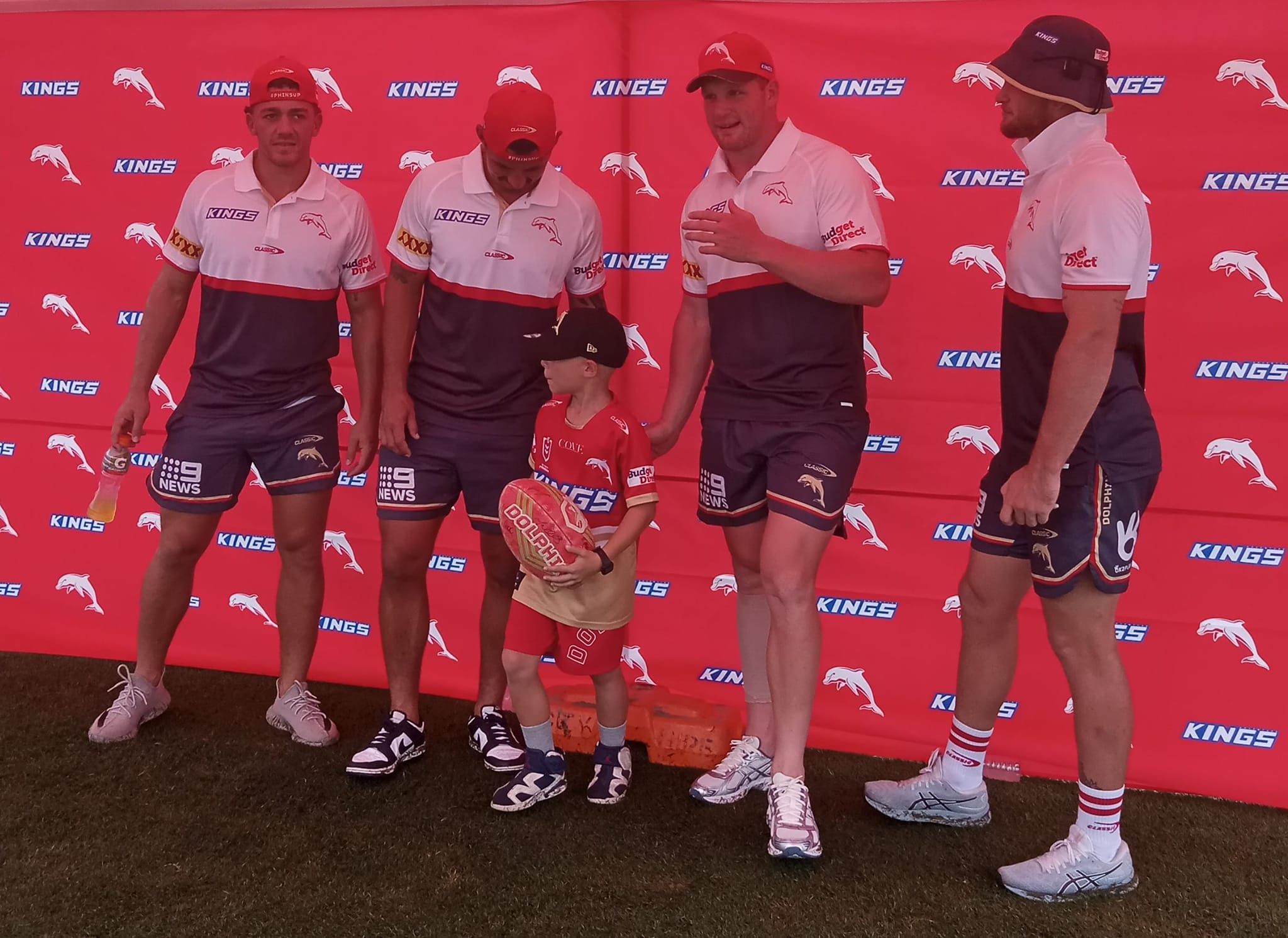
Donoghoe (left) with other Dolphins in 2024

In 2023, Donoghoe signed with the Central Queensland Capras and underwent pre-season training with their NRL affiliate club, the Dolphins. After playing in all three of the Dolphins' NRL trial games, Donoghoe signed a one-year contract with the club, and made his NRL debut in Round 1 of the 2023 NRL season in the Dolphins' inaugural match against the Sydney Roosters. In total, Donoghoe played seven regular season matches for the Dolphins in 2023.

=== 2024 ===
Donoghoe re-signed with the club until the end of 2025. Donoghoe played a total of ten matches for the Dolphins in the 2024 NRL season as the club finished 10th on the table. On 19 December, the Dolphins officially announced that Donoghoe had re-signed with the club on a one-year extension.

=== 2025 ===
Two months after signing his extension Donoghoe extended his contract until the end of 2027. Donoghoe played 22 games for the Dolphins in the 2025 NRL season as the club narrowly missed out on the finals finishing 9th.

=== 2026 ===
On 4 February 2026, the Dolphins announced that Donoghoe had extended his contract with the club until the end of 2028. Donoghoe played 17 games for the club in the 2026 NRL season including their preliminary final loss to eventual premiers the Sydney Roosters.

== Statistics ==
Year	Team	Games	Tries	Pts
2023	Dolphins	8		
2024	Dolphins	10	1	4
2025	Dolphins	22	3	12
2026	Dolphins	17	2	8
2027	Dolphins			
	Totals	57	6	24
