= Elijah Roltinga =

PNG international rugby league footballer

Personal information
- Full name: Elijah Roltinga
- Height: 184 cm (6 ft 0 in)
- Weight: 115 kg (18 st 2 lb)

Playing information
- Position: Wing, Centre
Club
Years	Team	Pld	T	G	FG	P
2024–	PNG Hunters	25	17	0	0	68
Representative
Years	Team	Pld	T	G	FG	P
2024	PNG Prime Minister's XIII	1	0	0	0	0
2024	Papua New Guinea	3	2	0	0	8
- Source: As of 23 July 2025

Elijah Roltinga is a Papua New Guinean professional rugby league footballer who plays as a wing and centre for the PNG Hunters in the QLD Cup and Papua New Guinea at international level.

== Career ==
Roltinga made his international debut for Papua New Guinea in their 22–10 victory over Fiji Bati in the 2024 Pacific Test.
