= Sereana Naitokatoka =

Fiji women's international rugby league player

Personal information
- Born: Sereana Naitokatoka; 2 June 2001 (age 25) Suva, Fiji
- Height: 165 cm (5 ft 5 in)
- Weight: 65 kg (10 st 3 lb)

Playing information
- Position: Five-eighth
Club
Years	Team	Pld	T	G	FG	P
2021–22	Parramatta Eels	4	0	0	0	0
2023–24	Cronulla-Sutherland Sharks	9	2	0	0	8
2024–26	Canberra Raiders	16	1	0	0	4
	Total	29	3	0	0	12
Representative
Years	Team	Pld	T	G	FG	P
2019–26	Fiji	10	0	7	0	14
- Source: RLP As of 11 November 2026

Sereana Naitokatoka (born 2 June 2001) is a Fiji women's international rugby league player. She plays five-eighth for the Canberra Raiders in the NRLW. She previously played for the Parramatta Eels and Cronulla-Sutherland Sharks.

== Career ==
She made her debut in round 1 of the 2022 NRL Women's season for the Eels against the Newcastle Knights.

She made her international debut for the Fiji Bulikula in 2019 against the Papua New Guinea Orchids.
