= Rhys Dakin =

American football player (born 2004)

No. 9 – Michigan State Spartans
- Position: Punter
- Class: Junior

Personal information
- Born: 7 December 2004 (age 21)
- Listed height: 6 ft 4 in (1.93 m)
- Listed weight: 228 lb (103 kg)

Career information
- High school: Mazenod (Mulgrave, Victoria)
- College: Iowa (2024–2025); Michigan State (2026–present)

Awards and highlights
- Second-team All-Big Ten (2024)
- Stats at ESPN

Rhys Dakin (born 7 December 2004) is an Australian gridiron football punter for the Michigan State Spartans. He previously played for the Iowa Hawkeyes (2024-2025).

== Early life ==
Dakin attended Mazenod College in Mulgrave, Victoria, after which he attended ProKick Australia and later committed to play college football for the Iowa Hawkeyes.

== College career ==
=== Iowa ===
Dakin entered the 2024 season as Iowa's starting punter as a true freshman. In week 4 of the 2024 season, he landed three punts inside the 20 yard-line in a victory over Minnesota, and was named the Ray Guy Award Punter of the Week. Dakin finished the 2024 season with 64 punts for an average of 44.1 yards per punt, with 29 being inside the opponents 20-yard line, 16 traveling over 50 yards, with just five being touchbacks, and only 12.5% of his punts being returned. He was named a freshman all-American by FWAA and being named second-team all-Big Ten. Heading into the 2025 season, he is projected to be one of the nation's top punters, being projected as the Ray Guy Award winner by CBS Sports.

=== Michigan State ===
On January 1, 2026, Dakin announced that he would be entering the transfer portal via X. On January 4, 2026, Dakin announced he was transferring to Michigan State University following his special teams coordinator Levar Woods.
