= Valentine Richard =

PNG international rugby league footballer

Personal information
- Full name: Valentine Richard
- Born: 3 March 1997 (age 29)
- Height: 184 cm (6 ft 0 in)
- Weight: 115 kg (18 st 2 lb)

Playing information
- Position: Prop
Club
Years	Team	Pld	T	G	FG	P
2023	PNG Hunters	4	0	0	0	0
2023	Central Queensland Capras	13	0	0	0	0
2024–	PNG Hunters	17	6	0	0	24
	Total	34	6	0	0	24
Representative
Years	Team	Pld	T	G	FG	P
2023–25	PNG Prime Minister's XIII	2	0	0	0	0
2023–	Papua New Guinea	5	1	0	0	4
- Source: As of 30 October 2026

Valentine Richard (born 3 March 1997) is a Papua New Guinean professional rugby league footballer who plays as a prop for the PNG Hunters in the QLD Cup and Papua New Guinea at international level.

== Career ==
Richard made his international debut for Papua New Guinea in their 46–10 victory over Cook Islands in the 2023 Pacific Test scoring a try.

On 12 October 2025 he played for the PNG Prime Minister's XIII in the 28-10 defeat to Australia’s Prime Minister's XIII in Port Moresby
