= Esom Ioka =

Cook Islands rugby league footballer

Personal information
- Born: 13 December 2002 (age 23) Auckland, New Zealand

Playing information
- Position: Wing, Centre, Fullback
Club
Years	Team	Pld	T	G	FG	P
2023–2024	Western Clydesdales
2025–2025	Northern Pride
2026	Brisbane Tigers	21	22
	Total	21	22	0	0	0
Representative
Years	Team	Pld	T	G	FG	P
2023–	Cook Islands	9	7	12	0	52
- Source: As of 28 October 2026

Esom Ioka (born 13 December 2002) is a Cook Islands international rugby league footballer who plays as a wing, centre or fullback.

== Background ==
Ioka was born in Auckland, New Zealand.

== Club career ==
Ioka made his Queensland Cup debut for Western Clydesdales against Brisbane Tigers in a 32–28 loss on 23 April 2023. He spent two seasons at the Clydesdales, before signing for the Northern Pride for the 2025 season.

In the 2025 NRL Pre-season Challenge, Ioka started at centre for the North Queensland Cowboys in their 50–8 loss against the Dolphins.

In 2026, he signed for the Brisbane Tigers, making 21 appearances and scoring 22 tries, the second highest tally of the season.

== International career ==
Ioka made his test debut on 15 October 2023 in the Cook Islands' 46–10 loss against Papua New Guinea, scoring a try and kicking a conversion from fullback.

On 6 October 2026, Ioka was named in the Cook Islands' 2026 World Cup squad. He started their first two matches, scoring a hat-trick in eight minutes against New Zealand in their second match before coming off with an injury.
