= Wise Kativerata =

Fiji international rugby league footballer and coach

Personal information
- Born: 3 January 1977 (age 48) Suva, Fiji

Playing information

Rugby league
- Position: Wing
Club
Years	Team	Pld	T	G	FG	P
2001–02	St. George Illawarra	5	1	0	0	4
2003	South Sydney	9	6	0	0	24
2004	Parramatta Eels	2	0	0	0	0
	Total	16	7	0	0	28
Representative
Years	Team	Pld	T	G	FG	P
2007	Fiji	1	0	0	0	0

Rugby union
Club
Years	Team	Pld	T	G	FG	P
2003–04	NSW Waratahs	6	1	0	0	0
Representative
Years	Team	Pld	T	G	FG	P
	Australia 7s	0	0	0	0	0

Coaching information
Representative
Years	Team	Gms	W	D	L	W%
2022–	Fiji	8	4	0	4	50
- Source: As of 26 October 2024

Wise Kativerata is a Fijian professional rugby league coach who is the head coach of Fiji and a former professional rugby league footballer who played in the 2000s for the Fiji national rugby league team.

He played as a centre for the St. George Illawarra Dragons, Parramatta Eels and the South Sydney Rabbitohs in the NRL. He also played Rugby Union for the NSW Waratahs and Australian Sevens Team

== Playing career ==
Kativerata made his first grade debut for St. George in round 13 of the 2001 NRL season. In 2003, Kativerata joined South Sydney and scored six tries in nine games for the club as they finished last on the table claiming the wooden spoon. In 2004, Kativerata joined Parramatta and made two appearances for the club. His last game in first grade was a 26-18 victory over Brisbane in round 2 of the 2004 NRL season.

== Coaching career ==
In October 2022, Kativerata took over as head coach of the Fiji Bati two days prior to their opening match of the postponed 2021 World Cup after the appointed coach, Joe Rabele, was hospitalised. In February 2023, the Fiji National Rugby League announced that Kativerata had been appointed as the men's national team coach on a permanent basis.
