= Judah Rimbu =

PNG international rugby league footballer

Personal information
- Full name: Judah Rimbu
- Born: 9 October 2001 (age 24) Mendi, Papua New Guinea
- Height: 172 cm (5 ft 8 in)
- Weight: 84 kg (13 st 3 lb)

Playing information
- Position: Hooker, Scrum-half
Club
Years	Team	Pld	T	G	FG	P
2021–24	PNG Hunters	69	21	11	0	106
2025	Castleford Tigers	10	1	0	0	4
2025	PNG Hunters	9	4	0	0	16
2026–	Brisbane Tigers	4	0	0	0	0
	Total	92	26	11	0	126
Representative
Years	Team	Pld	T	G	FG	P
2022–25	PNG Prime Minister's XIII	4	1	0	0	4
2023–	Papua New Guinea	6	1	0	0	4
- Source: As of 25 May 2026

Judah Rimbu (born 9 October 2001) is a Papua New Guinean professional rugby league footballer who plays as a hooker for the Brisbane Tigers in the Queensland Cup, and for Papua New Guinea at international level.

== Career ==
=== Castleford Tigers ===
In September 2024, Rimbu was linked with a move to the Castleford Tigers in the Super League after a prior deal with Hull FC had fallen through. On 1 November, Castleford announced that he would join from 2025 on a two-year contract.

Rimbu made his Tigers debut on 9 February 2025 against Bradford Bulls in the Challenge Cup. He scored the match-winning try against Salford Red Devils in round 4, and was awarded Man of the Match for his performance in defence and attack. He was also named League Express 'gamestar' against Huddersfield in round 9 for a "classy 80-minute display", including making a 20-40 kick.

=== Return to PNG Hunters ===
On 14 June 2025, it was announced that Rimbu would be released from his contract by mutual agreement to pursue other playing opportunities, having made 10 appearances for the Tigers.

=== Brisbane Tigers ===
On 9 November 2025 it was reported that he had signed for Brisbane Tigers in the Queensland Cup

== Representative ==
Rimbu made his international debut for Papua New Guinea in their 46–10 victory over Cook Islands in the 2023 Pacific Test.

On 12 October 2025 he played for the PNG Prime Minister's XIII in the 28-10 defeat to Australia’s Prime Minister's XIII in Port Moresby
