= Time in Papua New Guinea =

Papua New Guinea is divided into two time zones, namely:

- Papua New Guinea Standard Time (UTC+10:00), which covers most of Papua New Guinea except the Autonomous Region of Bougainville.
- Bougainville Standard Time (UTC+11:00), which covers the Autonomous Region of Bougainville.

== IANA time zone database ==
The IANA time zone database gives Papua New Guinea two time zones, Pacific/Bougainville and Pacific/Port_Moresby.

c.c.*	coordinates*	TZ*	Comments	UTC offset	DST
PG	−0613+15534	Pacific/Bougainville	Bougainville	+11:00	+11:00
PG	−0930+14710	Pacific/Port_Moresby	Papua New Guinea (most areas), Chuuk, Yap, Dumont d’Urville	+10:00	+10:00
