= Jacob Alick-Wiencke =

PNG international rugby league footballer

Personal information
- Full name: Jacob Alick-Wiencke
- Born: 3 November 1999 (age 27) Brisbane, Queensland, Australia
- Height: 6 ft 4 in (1.93 m)
- Weight: 16 st 7 lb (105 kg)

Playing information
- Position: Second-row, Lock, Prop
Club
Years	Team	Pld	T	G	FG	P
2023–25	Gold Coast Titans	19	0	0	0	0
2026–	Leigh Leopards	26	8	0	0	32
	Total	45	8	0	0	32
Representative
Years	Team	Pld	T	G	FG	P
2022–	Papua New Guinea	11	0	0	0	0
2025	PNG Prime Minister's XIII	1	0	0	0	0
- Source: As of 2 November 2025

Jacob Alick-Wiencke (born 3 November 1999) is a Papua New Guinea international rugby league footballer who plays as a second-rower or loose forward for the Leigh Leopards in the Super League.

== Early life ==
Alick-Wiencke was born in Brisbane, Australia. His late grandparents were born in Daru, Papua New Guinea.

== Career ==
Alick-Wiencke made his international debut for Papua New Guinea in their 24-14 victory over Fiji in the 2022 Pacific Test. In round 19 of the 2023 NRL season, Alick made his first grade debut for the Gold Coast against the Dolphins. Alick represented PNG at the 2021 World Cup held in 2022. Alick played a total of five matches for the Gold Coast in the 2023 NRL season as the club finished 14th on the table.

In round 12 of the 2024 NRL season, he played his first NRL match of 2024 in the Gold Coast Titans upset win over the Brisbane Broncos 36-34, he had 9 runs for 100m, a try assist, 27 tackles playing at centre. He played six games throughout 2024 as the club finished 14th on the table. On 19 November 2024, the Titans announced that Alick-Wiencke had re-signed with the club for the 2025 season.

=== 2025 ===
Alick-Wiencke was released by Gold Coast at the end of their season.

On 7 October 2025 it was reported that he had signed for Leigh Leopards in the Super League on a 3-year deal

On 12 October 2025 he made his debut for the PNG Prime Minister's XIII in the 28-10 defeat to Australia’s Prime Minister's XIII in Port Moresby
