= International rugby league in 2023 =

A list of men's, women's, and wheelchair senior international rugby league matches played throughout 2023.

A † denotes a match that did not contribute to the IRL World Rankings - i.e. not a senior international match (SIM) as designated by the International Rugby League (IRL). (Note: IRL defines a SIM as "any match in which a player represents a national federation, where such match has been sanctioned and recognised by IRL and the relevant national federations as a match played between senior national teams, which are national teams of a member national federation playing in a match for world rankings points.")

== Season overview ==
Men's international tours
Start date	Touring side	Region	Results [matches]
22 October 2023	Tonga	England	0–3 [3]
28 October 2023	Ukraine	Greece	2–0 [2]
8 November 2023	Kenya	South Africa	0–2 [2]
2 December 2023	France	Kenya	2–0 [2]

Men's international friendlies
Date	Home team	Away team	Winners
27 January 2023	Philippines	North Macedonia	North Macedonia
26 February 2023	Malta	North Macedonia	Malta
29 April 2023	England	France	England
13 May 2023	Greece	Serbia	Serbia
27 May 2023	Italy	Serbia	Serbia
22 July 2023	Philippines	South Africa	South Africa
26 August 2023	Czech Republic	Serbia	Serbia
16 September 2023	Poland	Czech Republic	Czech Republic
16 September 2023	Montenegro	Malta	Malta
23 September 2023	Malta	Bulgaria	Malta
24 September 2023	Serbia	France	France
30 September 2023	Netherlands	Norway	Netherlands
7 October 2023	Netherlands	Albania	Netherlands
7 October 2023	Italy	Malta	Italy
21 October 2023	Malta	Chile	Malta
21 October 2023	North Macedonia	Poland	Poland
21 October 2023	Germany	Netherlands	Netherlands
28 October 2023	Philippines	Malta	Malta
4 November 2023	Norway	Greece	Greece
4 November 2023	Germany	Poland	Germany
2 December 2023	Argentina	Brazil	Argentina
2 December 2023	Jamaica	United States	United States
16 December 2023	Kenya	Uganda	Cancelled

Men's international tournaments
Start date	Tournament	Winners
14 October 2023	Pacific Cup	New Zealand
14 October 2023	Pacific Bowl	Papua New Guinea
Cancelled tournament	Euro A and Euro B	N/A

Women's international tours
Start date	Touring side	Region	Results [matches]
3 November	Ghana	Nigeria	0–2 [2]

Women's international friendlies
Start date	Home team	Away team	Winners
28 January 2023	Greece	Philippines	Philippines
18 March 2023	France	Serbia	France
29 April 2023	England	France	England
3June 2023	Italy	Serbia	Italy
14 October 2023	Australia	New Zealand	Australia
15 October 2023	Samoa	Fiji	Samoa
21 October 2023	New Zealand	Tonga	New Zealand
22 October 2023	Papua New Guinea	Cook Islands	Papua New Guinea
28 October 2023	Australia	New Zealand	New Zealand
28 October 2023	Philippines	Malta	Philippines
29 October 2023	France	Wales	France
4 November 2023	England	Wales	England
11 November 2023	Serbia	Greece	Greece
9 December 2023	Greece	Netherlands	Netherlands
16 December 2023	Kenya	Uganda	Kenya

Women's international tournaments
Start date	Tournament	Winners
23 September 2023	Americas North Championship	Canada

Wheelchair international tours
Start date	Touring side	Region	Results [matches]
No international wheelchair tours in 2023.

Wheelchair international friendlies
Start date	Home team	Away team	Winners
5 November 2023	England	France	France
25 November 2023	France	England	England

Wheelchair international tournaments
Start date	Tournament	Winners
18 June 2023	Celtic Cup	Wales

== Rankings ==
The following were the rankings at the beginning of the season.

IRL Men's World Rankings
Official rankings as of 21 December 2022
Rank	Change	Team	Pts %
1	▲3	Australia	100.00
2	▼1	New Zealand	93.00
3	▲4	Samoa	87.00
4	▼1	England	73.00
5	▼3	Tonga	58.00
6	▼1	Papua New Guinea	47.00
7	▼1	Fiji	45.00
8	▲5	Lebanon	36.00
9	Steady	France	28.00
10	▲6	Wales	23.00
11	▲1	Ireland	23.00
12	▲8	Cook Islands	20.00
13	▲8	Jamaica	17.00
14	▲3	Italy	17.00
15	▼7	Serbia	15.00
16	▼5	Greece	14.00
17	▼2	Scotland	14.00
18	▼4	Netherlands	13.00
19	▼9	Malta	11.00
20	▼1	Turkey	8.00
21	▲4	Germany	6.00
22	▲18	Brazil	6.00
23	▲9	Chile	6.00
24	▲4	Nigeria	6.00
25	▲5	South Africa	6.00
26	▲5	Ghana	6.00
27	▼9	Czech Republic	6.00
28	▼2	Ukraine	5.00
29	▼5	Philippines	4.00
30	▼8	Poland	3.00
31	▲5	Cameroon	3.00
32	New entry	Kenya	3.00
33	▼4	Spain	3.00
34	▲7	Bulgaria	3.00
35	▼12	Norway	2.00
36	▲9	Colombia	2.00
37	▼2	Hungary*	1.00
38	▼11	United States	1.00
39	▲5	Montenegro	1.00
40	▲3	Bosnia and Herzegovina	1.00
41	▼2	Solomon Islands	1.00
42	▼8	Sweden	1.00
43	▼10	Morocco	1.00
44	▼6	Canada	1.00
45	New entry	Japan	1.00
46	▼4	Vanuatu	1.00
47	New entry	El Salvador	0.00
48	▼1	Belgium	1.00
49	▼3	Denmark	0.00
50	▼3	Latvia	0.00
51	New entry	Argentina	0.00
Complete rankings at INTRL.SPORT

IRL Women's World Rankings
Official rankings as of 21 December 2022
Rank	Change	Team	Pts %
1	Steady	Australia	100.00
2	Steady	New Zealand	80.00
3	Steady	England	68.00
4	Steady	Papua New Guinea	33.00
5	Steady	France	30.00
6	▲5	Cook Islands	28.00
7	▼1	Canada	24.00
8	▲6	Ireland	22.00
9	▼2	Wales	20.00
10	▲7	Brazil	17.00
11	▲7	Greece	14.00
12	▼4	Serbia	9.00
13	▼4	Turkey	7.00
14	▼1	Italy	6.00
15	▼5	Tonga	6.00
16	New entry	Malta	4.00
17	▼2	United States	3.00
18	▼6	Fiji	2.00
19	New entry	Philippines	2.00
20	▼4	Samoa	2.00
21	▼2	Lebanon	1.00
22	New entry	Argentina	0.00
Complete rankings at INTRL.SPORT

IRL Wheelchair World Rankings
Official rankings as of 21 December 2022
Rank	Change	Team	Pts %
1	Steady	England	100.00
2	Steady	France	85.00
3	▲1	Wales	61.00
4	▼1	Australia	52.00
5	Steady	Ireland	42.00
6	Steady	Scotland	33.00
7	Steady	Spain	21.00
8	Steady	United States	19.00
8	Steady	Italy	00.00
Complete rankings at INTRL.SPORT

== January ==
=== Philippines men vs North Macedonia in Australia ===
27 January 2023

Philippines	16–28	North Macedonia
Tries: Stephenson, Mackey, Forrest; Goals: Stephenson 2/2	Source	Tries: Srbinovski, Moncaster, Kulevski, Metelkovski, Mitrevski; Goals: Kulevski 3/4, Metelkovski 1/1

Terry Lamb Complex, Sydney

Team details
Philippines		Position	North Macedonia
Name	Number	Position	Number	Name
Isaac Rosario	1	FB	1	Reece Savlouron
Ivan Lynch	2	WG	2	Angelo Avramovski
Blake Mackey	3	CE	3	Jake Boskovski
Isaac Acheampong	4	CE	4	Sean Metelkovski
Johansel Avery	5	WG	5	Jimmy Kostrevski
Ned Stephenson	6	FE/SO	6	Josh Moncaster
Mark Roberts	7	HB/SH	7	Dean Ravcinoski
Dylan Jones	8	PR	8	James Mireski
Gerald Reyes	9	HK	9	Jake Mitrevski
Ryan Jones	10	PF	10	Alexander Srbinovski
Daniel Kucia	11	SR	11	Pleks Stojanovski
Jordan Jones	12	SR	12	Brad Moncaster
Jeromy Cairns	13	LK/LF	13	Dean Kulevski
Jeffrey Vaughan	14	IN	14	Toni Gesovski
Benjamin Jegede	15	IN	15	Jamie Miletic
Brandon Racoma Ngata	16	IN	16	Josh Kostevski
Henry Wicks	17	IN	17	Michael Boskovski
Ian Nelson	18	RES	18	George Todorovski
Nikolas Forrest	19	RES	19	Nick Purdevski
Russell Nelson	20	IN	20	Jake Todeski

=== Greece women vs Philippines in Australia ===
28 January 2023
17:00 AEDT (UTC+11:00)

Greece	0–38	Philippines
	Report	Tries: Lyden (12'), Jamieson (17'), Thomas (23'), Wells (38'), Koch (51'), Webb (60'), Galon (69'), Buchanan (73'); Goals: Jamieson 3/9

Lidcombe Oval, Sydney
Referee: Rami Abu-Mansour (Australia)

Team details
Greece		Position	Philippines
Name	Number	Position	Number	Name
Alexia Foster Papanicolau	1	FB	1	Takiah Buchanan
Antonia Karias	2	WG	2	Stefanie Thomas
Taliah Mafi	3	CE	3	Pia Galon
Angelina Ballas	4	CE	4	Tynia Wells
Ebony Tsoukas	5	WG	5	Linae Williams
Lavinia Taukamo	6	SO/FE	6	Cassandra Koch
Maria Posantzis	7	SH/HB	7	Natalie Webb
Cherish Tseros	8	PR	8	Charlene Vaughan
Jonaya Bent	9	HK	9	Tommy Fletcher
Mikayla Tuliatu	10	PF	10	Alana-Lee Grace
Christine Tsougranis	11	SR	11	Jacky Lyden
Stella Lellis	12	SR	12	Meagan Rickertt
Meleanna Waters	13	LF/LK	13	Janine Jamieson
Jasmin Testa	14	IN	14	Lila Reynolds
Lisa Poulakis	15	IN	15	Leah Ellem
Simone Stephen	16	IN	16	Taneisha Canoy
Stephanie Glumac	17	IN	17	Stefanie Brown-Galbra
Stuart McLennan		Coach		Jake Kamire

== February ==
=== Malta men vs North Macedonia in Australia ===
26 February 2023
15:00 AEDT (UTC+11:00)

Malta	32–16	North Macedonia

Forshaw Park, Sydney

== March ==
=== France women vs Serbia ===
18 March 2023
19:00 CET (UTC+01:00)

France	116–0	Serbia
Tries: Biville (4), Guillerot (3), Ramazeilles (2), Ramos (2), Bianchini (2), Roses (2), Michel (2), Canal, D. Samarra, M. Samarra; Goals: Pommier (18)	Report

Parc des Sports, Avignon
Attendance: 1,100
Referee: Tony Palacios (Spain)

Team details
France		Position	Serbia
Name	Number	Position	Number	Name
Manon Samarra	1	Fullback	1	Tamara Bošnjak
Margot Canal	2	Wing	2	Ljiljana Bajic
Cloe Guillerot	3	Centre	3	Nika Bajic
Laureane Biville	4	Centre	4	Anastasija Karanovic
Perle Ramazeilles	5	Wing	5	Katarina Veljanovsku
Mahault Pommier	6	Stand off	6	Jelena Stojiljkovic
Laurianne Canet	7	Scrum half	7	Marija Maslakovic
Ines Legout	8	Prop forward	8	Teodora Marin
Fanny Ramos	9	Hooker	9	Natasa Kovacevic
Leila Bessahli	10	Prop forward	10	Jovana Fridl
Elisa Akpa	11	Second row	11	Sanja Starcevic
Melanie Bianchini	12	Second row	12	Uma Cengaj
Dorine Samarra	13	Loose forward	13	Teodora Marin
Lise Michel	14	Interchange	14	Anastasija Djordjevic
Sarah Menaa	15	Interchange	15	Marija Simovic
Salomé Ségala	16	Interchange	16	Teodora Micic
Justine Roses	17	Interchange	17	Natasa Vignjevic
Romain Maillot		Coach		Marija Maslakovic

== April ==
=== England vs France double header ===
Women's

29 April 2023
14:00 BST (UTC+01:00)

England	64–0	France
Tries: Stanley, Partington, Renouf, Hardcastle, Burke (4), Hoyle, Dodd (2), Peach; Goals: Stanley (8/12)	Report

Halliwell Jones Stadium, Warrington
Referee: Kristoff Young (Wales)
Touch judges: Aaryn Golding-Belafonte, Dean Bowmer (England)
Player of the Match: Leah Burke (England)

Team details
England		Position	France
Name	Number	Position	Number	Name
Tara-Jane Stanley	1	FB	1	Manon Samarra
Eboni Partington	2	WG	2	Perle Ramazeilles
Tamzin Renouf	3	CE	3	Lauréane Biville
Amy Hardcastle	4	CE	4	Cloé Guillerot
Leah Burke	5	WG	5	Margot Canal
Zoe Harris	6	SO	6	Mahault Pommier
Georgia Roche	7	SH	7	Lauriane Canet
Liv Wood	8	PR	8	Inès Legout
Keara Bennett	9	HK	9	Fanny Ramos
Shona Hoyle	10	PF	10	Nabila Zaghdoudi
Emily Rudge	11	SR	11	Elisa Akpa
Hollie-Mae Dodd	12	SR	12	Tallis Kuresa
Jodie Cunningham	13	LF	13	Dorine Samarra
Sinead Peach	14	IN	14	Lise Michel
Vicky Whitfield	15	IN	15	Sarah Menaa
Grace Field	16	IN	16	Salomé Segala
Vicky Molyneux	17	IN	17	Justine Roses
Tara Jones	18	RES	18	Amael Vilanove
Stuart Barrow		Coach		Roman Maillot

Men's

29 April 2023
16:30 BST (UTC+01:00)

England	64–0	France
Tries: Handley (3), Wardle, Williams (3), Smith, Havard, Walker, Pearce-Paul; Goals: Smith (9/10), Williams (1/1)	Report

Halliwell Jones Stadium, Warrington
Attendance: 8,422
Referee: Liam Moore (England)
Touch judges: Johnny Roberts, Warren Turley (England)
Player of the Match: George Williams (England)

Team details
England		Position	France
Name	Number	Position	Number	Name
Jack Welsby	1	FB	1	Tanguy Zenon
Ash Handley	2	WG	2	Arthur Romano
Toby King	3	CE	3	Samisoni Langi
Jake Wardle	4	CE	4	Mathieu Laguerre
Matty Ashton	5	WG	5	Paul Marcon
George Williams	6	SO	6	Arthur Mourgue
Harry Smith	7	SH	7	César Rougé
Ethan Havard	8	PR	8	Tiaki Chan
Danny Walker	9	HK	9	Anthony Marion
Tom Holroyd	10	PF	10	Florian Vailhen
Kai Pearce-Paul	11	SR	11	Benjamin Jullien
Matty Nicholson	12	SR	12	Mathieu Cozza
Morgan Smithies	13	LF	13	Mickaël Goudemand
Jez Litten	14	IN	14	Ugo Tison
James Harrison	15	IN	15	Justin Sangaré
Ben Currie	16	IN	16	Bastien Scimone
Tyler Dupree	17	IN	17	Louis Jouffret
Josh Thewlis	18	RES	18	Mathieu Jussaume
Shaun Wane		Coach		Laurent Frayssinous

== May ==
=== Greece men vs Serbia ===
13 May 2023
18:00 EEST (UTC+03:00)

Greece	6–40	Serbia
Tries: Dardamanis; Goals: Nake	Report	Tries: Trifunovic (2), Pavlovic (3), Kokanovic (2); Goals: Jasari (6)

Nea Smyrni Stadium, Athens
Attendance: ≈1,000
Referee: Andrew Pilkington (Spain)

Team details
Greece		Position	Serbia
Name	Number	Position	Number	Name
Ioannis Nake	1	FB	1	Dragan Jankovic
Iordanis Triantafyllou	2	WG	2	Milos Zogovic
Alexandros Aliu	3	CE	3	Rajko Trifunovic
Charilaos Xygkas	4	CE	4	Aleksandar Pavlovic
Michail Bosmos	5	WG	5	Dragan Kokanovic
Stephanos Stephanou	6	SO	6	Dzavid Jasari
Aris Dardamanis	7	SH	7	Vojislav Dedic
Stefanos Bastas	8	PR	8	Marko Jankovic
Nikolaos Stefanou	9	HK	9	Vladislav Dedic
Athanasios Lamprou	10	PF	10	Mihajlo Jovic
Leonidas Mingko	11	SR	11	Miodrag Tomic
Theofylaktos Paraskevopoulos	12	SR	12	Stefan Arsic
Aris Koulizakis	13	LF	13	Nikola Djuric
Georgios Paliogiannis	14	IN	14	Denis Cengaj
Panagiotis Karefilis	15	IN	15	Enis Bibic
Konstantinos Papageorgiou	16	IN	16	Strahinja Stojiljkovic
Nikolaos Papanikolaou	17	IN	17	Valentino Milovanovic
Michalis Chatziioannou		Coach		Darren Fisher

=== Italy men vs Serbia ===
27 May 2023
18:00 CEST (UTC+02:00)

Italy	4–52	Serbia
Tries: Toffoletti	Report	Tries: Pavlovic, Jankovic (5), Kokanovic, Tomic, Vladislav Dedic, Vojislav Dedic; Goals: Jasari (6/10)

Rugby Club Pasian di Prato, Udine
Referee: Ciprian Gajulete (Italy)

Team details
Italy		Position	Serbia
Name	Number	Position	Number	Name
Ricardo Crocella	1	FB	1	Dragan Jankovic
Mishel Shmai	2	WG	2	Rajko Trifunovic
Emiliano Buraschi	3	CE	3	Denis Cengaj
Francesco Vallone	4	CE	4	Aleksandar Pavlovic
Lorenzo Sosta	5	WG	5	Dragan Kokanovic
Alessandro Corte	6	SO	6	Dzavid Jasari
Giordano Arena	7	SH	7	Vojislav Dedic
Giovanni Rizzo	8	PR	8	Mihajlo Jovic
Ippolito Occhialini	9	HK	9	Vladislav Dedic
Fabio Galetto	10	PF	10	Enis Bibic
Davide Colla	11	SR	11	Miodrag Tomic
Giona Toffoletti	12	SR	12	Nikola Djuric
Giole Celerino	13	LF	13	Milos Calic
Mauro Quarino	14	IN	14	Stefan Arsic
Tommaso Zuliani	15	IN	15	Strahinja Stojilkovic
Kevin Fadini	16	IN	16	Marko Jakovljevic
Alex Rojatto	17	IN	17	Marko Jankovic
Salvatore Pezzano		Coach		Darren Fisher

== June ==
=== Italy women vs Serbia ===
3 June 2023
15:00 CEST (UTC+02:00)

Italy	34–14	Serbia
Tries: Giacomazzo, Hassnien (2), Forto (2), Pantaleoni (2), Piovano; Goals: Pantaleoni (0/5), Dall' Antonia (1/3)	Report	Tries: Karanovic, Veljanovski, Simic; Goals: Bosnjak (1/3)

Rugby Club Pasian di Prato, Udine
Referee: Ciprian Gajulete (Italy)

Team details
Italy		Position	Serbia
Name	Number	Position	Number	Name
Alessandra Monotti	1	FB	1	Tamara Bosnjak
Rebecca Liliana Pantaleoni	2	WG	2	Katarina Veljanovski
Loide Agosta	3	CE	3	Anastasija Karanovic
Camilla Matilde Giacomazzo	4	CE	4	Nika Bajic
Rwan Hassnien	5	WG	5	Teodora Micic
Cecilia Piva	6	SO	6	Karolina Blizana
Valentina Virgili	7	SH	7	Jelena Stojiljkovic
Giulia Carniato	8	PR	8	Teodora Marin
Martina Dall' Antonia	9	HK	9	Nataša Kovaceviv
Marika Ascione	10	PF	10	Natalija Simic
Silvia Gai	11	SR	11	Sanja Starcevic
Marvin Severgnini	12	SR	12	Jovana Fridl
Virginia Pinarello	13	LF	13	Marija Maslakovic
Enrica Pandolfo	14	IN	14	Marija Simovic
Vanessa Ruggeri	15	IN	15	Natalija Pavlovic
Altea Forto	16	IN	16	Uma Cengaj
Ottavia Piovano	17	IN	17	Ljiljana Baji
Alberto Suin		Coach

=== Celtic Cup ===
18 June 2023
12:00 BST (UTC+01:00)

Scotland	24–58	Ireland
Tries: D. Grant, Young, M. Grant, Lauder; Goals: D. Grant (4/4)	Report	Tries: Johnston (5), McCarthy, Wooloff (3), Calcott (2), Griffith; Goals: Johnston (5/11)

Oriam Performance Centre, Edinburgh
Referees: Rebecca Whiteley (England), David Butler (England)

Team details
Scotland		Position	Ireland
Name	Number	Position	Number	Name
Daniel Grant	1	Starter	1	Peter Johnston
John Willans	2	Starter	2	James McCarthy
Calum Davidson	3	Starter	3	Paddy Forbes
Callum Young	4	Starter	4	Phil Roberts
Cadyn Thomson	5	Starter	5	Rick Rodgers
Michael Grant	6	Interchange	6	Matthew Wooloff
Martin Dougan	7	Interchange	7	Joe Calcott
Graeme Stewart	8	Interchange	8	Toby Burton-Carter
Pete Lauder	9	Interchange	9	Cian Horgan
Neil Johnston	10	Interchange	10	Melanie Griffiths

18 June 2023
14:00 BST (UTC+01:00)

Ireland	30–30	Wales
Tries: Johnston (2), Roberts, Spain, Calcott; Goals: Johnston (5/5)	Report	Tries: Lane (2), Preece, S. Williams, Trigg-Turner (2); Goals: Halsey (2/4), Preece (1/2)

Oriam Performance Centre, Edinburgh
Referees: Ollie Cruickshank (Scotland), Rebecca Whiteley (England)

Team details
Ireland		Position	Wales
Name	Number	Position	Number	Name
Oran Spain	1	Starter	1	Stuart Williams
Phil Roberts	2	Starter	2	Stephen Halsey
Peter Johnston	3	Starter	3	Gary Preece
Joe Calcott	4	Starter	4	Harry Jones
Matthew Wooloff	5	Starter	5	Martin Lane
Toby Burton-Carter	6	Interchange	6	Scott Trigg-Turner
Paddy Forbes	7	Interchange	7	Mason Baker
Cian Horgan	8	Interchange	8	Lucie Roberts
James McCarthy	9	Interchange	9	Mark Williams
Rick Rodgers	10	Interchange	10	Alex Powell

18 June 2023
16:00 BST (UTC+01:00)

Scotland	30–76	Wales
Tries: Willans, M. Grant, D. Grant, Davidson, Dougan; Goals: D. Grant (5/5)	Report	Tries: Halsey (2), S. Williams (2), Preece (3), Jones (2), Lane, Roberts, Sargent, M. Williams; Goals: Halsey (11/12), Baker (1/1)

Oriam Performance Centre, Edinburgh
Referees: David Butler (England), Karli Wilkinson (England)

Team details
Scotland		Position	Wales
Name	Number	Position	Number	Name
Callum Young	1	Starter	1	Stuart Williams
Midge Hartley	2	Starter	2	Stephen Halsey
John Willians	3	Starter	3	Gary Preece
Daniel Grant	4	Starter	4	Harry Jones
Michael Grant	5	Starter	5	Martin Lane
Olivia Foulton	6	Interchange	6	Scott Trigg-Turner
Martin Dougan	7	Interchange	7	Mason Baker
Calum Davidson	8	Interchange	8	Lucie Roberts
Graeme Stewart	9	Interchange	9	Mark Williams
Cadyn Thomson	10	Interchange	10	Lee Sargent

== July ==
=== Philippines men vs South Africa in Australia ===
Felix Florenz Cup

22 July 2023
15:00 AEST (UTC+10:00)

Philippines	14–72	South Africa
Tries: Cairns, Lynch, O'Leary; Goals: Russell (1/3)	Report	Tries: Blake (3), Bull, Perry, Turner, Martin, de Vlieg (2), Canning (2), Gilham; Goals: Cryer (11/11), Canning (1/1)

Tugan RLFC, Gold Coast
Referee: Lachlan Sutton (Australia)

Team details
Philippines		Position	South Africa
Name	Number	Position	Number	Name
Isaac Rosario	1	FB	1	Luke de Vlieg
Ivan Lynch	2	WG	2	Jason Smith
Gerald Ubaldo	3	CE	3	Keegan Turner
Thomas Cartwright	4	CE	4	Bevan De Vries
Richard Mante	5	WG	5	Jason Cutler
Tyrone O'Leary	6	FE	6	Reilly Canning
Marc Russell	7	HB	7	Kam Cryer
Dylan Jones	8	PR	8	Joel Tubbs
Tyrone Tootell	9	HK	9	Harry Blake
Ryan Jones	10	PF	10	Shane Gilham
Russell Nelson	11	SR	11	Halvor Harris
Ian Nelson	12	SR	12	Kobe Martin
AJ Morrison	13	LK	13	Ayden Perry
Gerald Reyes	14	IN	14	Jovan Pienar
Jeromy Cairns	15	IN	15	Kalum Gulliver-Brown
Raffy Dian Zappia	16	IN	16	Jason King
Jordan Jones	17	IN	17	Ashley Bull
Paul Sheedy		Coach		Daryll Fisher

== August ==
=== Czech Republic men vs Serbia ===
26 August 2023
15:00 CEST
(UTC+02:00)

Czech Republic	16–28	Serbia
Tries: Bělohlávek, Adamec, Hudrlík; Goals: Hudrlík (2/3)	Report	Tries: Bibic, Stojilkovic, Stojanovic (2), Cuk; Goals: Markovic (1/2), Jasari (3/3)

Městský Stadion, Krupka
Referee: Misa Vakadranu (Fiji)

Team details
Czech Republic		Position	Serbia
Name	Number	Position	Number	Name
Dominik Fišer	1	FB	1	Dzavid Jasari
Oldřich Chrbolka	2	WG	2	Aleksandar Stojanovic
Roman Richtr	3	CE	3	Marko Cuk
Antonín Berk	4	CE	4	Luka Ilic
Jakub Tichý	5	WG	5	Luka Stosic
David Vaselý	6	SO	6	Marko Jakovljevic
Jakub Hudrlík	7	SH	7	Aleksandar Markovic
Tomáš Adamec	8	PR	8	Stefan Novakovic
Tomáš Zicica	9	HK	9	Mihailo Tomic
Jaroslav Novotný	10	PF	10	Jasmin Bibic
David Bělohlávek	11	SR	11	Igor Vratnian
Matous Zvec	12	SR	12	Strahinja Stojilkovic
Ondřej Preininger	13	LF	13	Enis Bibic
Vít Studecký	14	IN	14	Nenad Zujic
Matěj Soukup	15	IN	15	Velibor Karanovic
Marek Teichman	16	IN	16	Lazar Stamenkovic
Jaroslav Bzoch	17	IN	17	Stefan Milenkovic
Petr Šedina		Coach		Darren Fisher

== September ==
=== Poland men vs Czech Republic ===
16 September 2023
14:30 CEST (UTC+02:00)

Poland	28–36	Czech Republic
Tries: Glinkowski, Kostecki, Tutak, Krzypkowski, Zerbe; Goals: Mitek (4/5)	Report	Tries: Schejbal (2), Bělohlávek (2), Hudrlík, Kasík, Brynda; Goals: Hudrlík (4/7)

Majkowski Wembley, Kalisz
Referee: Misa Vakadranu (Fiji)

Team details
Poland		Position	Czech Republic
Name	Number	Position	Number	Name
Fabian Glinkowski	1	FB	1	Roman Richtr
Łukasz Wawrzyniak	2	WG	2	Adam Mikuláš
Kamil Owoc	3	CE	3	Tomáš Kasík
Jakub Zalewski	4	CE	4	Daniel Rypl
Mateusz Kłosiński	5	WG	5	Matěj Schejbal
Łukasz Łucka	6	SO	6	Jakub Hudrlík
Jakub Mitek	7	SH	7	Josef Brynda
Mateusz Dziąg	8	PR	8	David Bělohlávek
Tomasz Zerbe	9	HK	9	Jakub Czermak
Maciej Myszkowski	10	PF	10	Kamil Havel
Michał Krzypkowski	11	SR	11	Vít Studecký
Patryk Gabryś	12	SR	12	Jakub Jirman
Jonathan Tutak	13	LF	13	Erik Schulz
Dawid Krawczyński	14	IN	14	Marek Henzl
Karol Myszkowski	15	IN	15	Adam Vrbata
Łukasz Kostecki	16	IN	16	Jaroslav Novotný
Mateusz Kowalewski	17	IN	17	David Slivka
Colin Baker		Coach		Tomáš Adamec

=== Montenegro men vs Malta ===
Medieval Shield

16 September 2023
18:00 CEST (UTC+02:00)

Montenegro	10–34	Malta
Tries: Brahimi, Novakovic; Goals: Popovic (1/2)	Report	Tries: J. Azzopardi, K. Dimech, Cassar, Gauci, N. Azzopardi, Camilleri, R. Dimech; Goals: J. Azzopardi (1/5), Gauci (2/2)

Stadion u Parku, Tivat
Referee: Vladan Kikanovic (Serbia)

Team details
Montenegro		Position	Malta
Name	Number	Position	Number	Name
Marko Novakovic	1	FB	1	Mark Camilleri
Marko Fatic	2	WG	2	Jean Scholey
Boban Banjevic	3	CE	3	Kyle Gauci
Burim Brahimi	4	CE	4	Reece Dimech
Milos Dasic	5	WG	5	Aiden Demicoli
Srdjan Popovic	6	SO	6	Jayden Azzopardi
Milos Kucancanin	7	SH	7	Karl Cassar
Igor Adzaip	8	PR	8	Jean-Pierre Zarb
Ilija Ivanovic	9	HK	9	Robin Cutajar
Redzep Baljaj	10	PF	10	Josh Cassar
Elvis Cenaj	11	SR	11	William Watts
Goran Novakovic	12	SR	12	Mark Roberston
Bogdan Raicevic	13	LF	13	Kaine Dimech
Bojan Mizdalo	14	IN	14	Scott Beerman
Andrija Dakic	15	IN	15	Luke Musu
Stevan Radonjic	16	IN	16	Nicky Vella
Aleksandar Mecikucic	17	IN	17	Noah Azzopardi
Ian Giddings		Coach		Anthony Micallef

=== Malta men vs Bulgaria ===
23 September 2023
16:00 CEST (UTC+02:00)

Malta	78–0	Bulgaria
Tries: Dalton (2), Sammut (3), Scholey (2), Dimech, Gauci, Scicluna, Robertson (3); Goals: Sammut (13/13)	Report

Marsa Sports Complex, Marsa
Referee: Tony Palacios (Spain)

Team details
Malta		Position	Bulgaria
Name	Number	Position	Number	Name
Mark Camilleri	1	FB	1	Doycho Slavin
Jean Scholey	2	WG	2	Georgi Parizov
Kyle Gauci	3	CE	3	James Sherwood
Alfie Jewitt	4	CE	4	Kevork Kasparyan
Reece Dimech	5	WG	5	Kiril Atanasov
Karl Cassar	6	SO	6	Martin Hristov
Jarrod Sammut	7	SH	7	Maxim Joakimsman
Justin Davenport	8	PR	8	Mitko Atanasov
Robin Cutajar	9	HK	9	Teodor Manchev
Jean-Pierre Zarb	10	PF	10	Tihomir Simeonov
William Watts	11	SR	11	Tsvetan Rashev
Mark Robertson	12	SR	12	Simeon Tsvetanov
Kaine Dimech	13	LF	13	Stanislav Borisov
Brendan Dalton	14	IN	14	Vladislav Parizov
Peter Debono	15	IN	15	Aleksandar Tomanov
Liam Scicluna	16	IN	16	Veselin Peychev
Karol Spiteri	17	IN	17	Anton Georgiev
Phil Humphrey		Coach

=== Women’s Americas North Championship ===
23 September 2023
15:30 JAM (UTC-05:00)

Jamaica	8–78	United States
Tries: Scarlett; Goals: Smith (2/2)	Report	Tries: Royes (4), Campbell (3), Bailous (2), Blackmore, Bradley, Snyder, Fuerst, Jordan, Black-Keels; Goals: Treco (4/7), Campbell (5/7)

University of West Indies, Kingston
Referee: Kemoy White (Jamaica)
Player of the Match: Brittany Royes (United States)

Team details
Jamaica		Position	USA
Name	Number	Position	Number	Name
Shanice Stewart	1	FB	1	Brittney Royes
Mischica Stewart	2	WG	2	Agnes Fuerst
Shoya Gordon	3	CE	3	Cyndi Campbell
Tajera Nicholson	4	CE	4	Marcaya Bailous
Venisha McLeish	5	WG	5	Mariah Blackmore
Alicia Richards	6	SO	6	Samantha Black-Keels
Shanique Smith	7	SH	7	Courtney Treco
Sherine Johnson	8	PR	8	Paris Hart
Lovel Atkinson	9	HK	9	Nicole Fisch
Zahra Ennis	10	PF	10	Narcisse Jordan
Darcey Price	11	SR	11	Jeanna Beard
Nassandra Miller	12	SR	12	Kadie Sanford
Tihanna Lewinson	13	LF	13	Caitlin Davis
Anneisha McAllister	14	IN	14	Danielle Pola Walko Siua
Daynna Angus	15	IN	15	Shamarica Scott
Debisha Scarlett	16	IN	16	Rachel Bradley
Ameir Kinlock	17	IN	17	Nikki Snyder

25 September 2023
15:30 JAM (UTC-05:00)

United States	4–30	Canada
Tries: Granby	Report	Tries: Scholten, Butler, Pakulis, Woods, Crowl; Goals: Franada (5/5)

University of West Indies, Kingston
Referee: Peter Tapper (Jamaica)
Player of the Match: Megan Pakulis (Canada)

Team details
USA		Position	Canada
Name	Number	Position	Number	Name
Taylor White	1	FB	1	Petra Woods
Agnes Fuerst	2	WG	2	Lauren Mueller
Christine Sargent	3	CE	3	Candace Scholten
Cyndi Campbell	4	CE	4	Matilda Butler
Britney Royes	5	WG	5	Brittany Jones
Robyn Oliveri	6	SO	6	Dani Franada
Courtney Treco	7	SH	7	Natalie Tam
Paris Hart	8	PR	8	Chantelle Crowl
Tiana Granby	9	HK	9	Gabrielle Hindley
Nicki Snyder	10	PF	10	Elizabeth Steele
Sara Esther Anderson	11	SR	11	Maddy Adberg
Kadie Sandford	12	SR	12	Rachel Choboter
Samantha Black-Keels	13	LF	13	Megan Pakulis
Danielle Pola Wazko-Siua	14	IN	14	Savanah Bacchus
Shamarica Scott	15	IN	15	Ada Okomkwo–Dappa
Marcaya Bailous	16	IN	16	Fedelia Angles
Narcisse Jordan	17	IN	17	Sarah Maguire
Adrian Cooney		Coach		Mike Castle

27 September 2023
15:30 JAM (UTC-05:00)

Canada	64–2	Jamaica
Tries: Franada, Sandboe (2), Aberg, Steele, Angles (2), Lewis, Woods (2), Hindley, Maguire; Goals: Frananda (8/12)	Report	Goals: McCalla (1/1)

University of West Indies, Kingston
Referee: Kemoy Whyte (Jamaica)
Player of the Match: Fedelia Angles (Canada)

Team details
Jamaica		Position	Canada
Name	Number	Position	Number	Name
MacKayla McCalla	1	FB	1	Petra Woods
Shanice Stewart	2	WG	2	Erin Gawley
Tajera Nicholson	3	CE	3	Lauren Mueller
Natassia Scarlet	4	CE	4	Maddy Aberg
Mishka Stewart	5	WG	5	Ferris Sandboe
Shanique Smith	6	SO	6	Danielle Franada
Alicia Richards	7	SH	7	Ale Lewis
Debisha Scarlett	8	PR	8	Liz Steele
Lovel Atkinson	9	HK	9	Gabrielle Hindley
Zahra Ennis	10	PF	10	Sarah Maguire
Nassandra Miller	11	SR	11	Chantelle Crowl
Kamoya Forrest	12	SR	12	Rachel Choboter
Tihanna Lewinson	13	LF	13	Megan Pakulis
Janelle Cole	14	IN	14	Natalie Tam
Jamila Fairclough	15	IN	15	Tamisha Toussaint
Darcey Pryce	16	IN	16	Ada Okonkwo-Dappa
Glacia Simpson	17	IN	17	Fedelia Angles
Adrian Cooney		Coach		Mike Castle

=== Serbia men in France ===
24 September 2023
16:00 CEST (UTC+02:00)

Serbia	10–78	France
Tries: Pavlovic, Jasari; Goals: Jasari (1/2)	Report	Tries: Verginol (2), Pedrero (3), Griffier, Laguerre (2), Herrero (2), Rouge, Rey, Laurent, Vailhen; Goals: Herrero (11/14)

FK Obilić Stadium, Belgrade
Referee: Andrew Pilkington (Spain)

Team details
Serbia		Position	France
Name	Number	Position	Number	Name
Dragan Jankovic	1	FB	1	Enzo Griffier
Rajko Trifunovic	2	WG	2	Nittim Pedrero
Denis Cengaj	3	CE	3	Matthieu Laguerre
Aleksandar Pavlovic	4	CE	4	Louis Carre
Marko Cuk	5	WG	5	Corentin Rey
Dzavid Jasari	6	SO	6	Cesar Rouge
Vojislav Dedic	7	SH	7	Clement Herrero
Vlado Kusic	8	PR	8	Bastien Scimone
Vladislav Dedic	9	HK	9	Ugo Tison
Enis Bibic	10	PF	10	Florien Vailhen
Miodrag Tomic	11	SR	11	Corentin Le Cam
Stefan Arsic	12	SR	12	Lucas Vergniol
Nikola Djuric	13	LF	13	Clement Boyer
Vuk Štrbac	14	IN	14	Justin Bouscayrol
Mihajlo Jovic	15	IN	15	Franck Maria
Strahinja Stojilkovic	16	IN	16	Leo Laurent
Marko Jankovic	17	IN	17	Mathias Marty
Darren Fisher		Coach		Maxime Greseque

=== Netherlands men vs Norway ===
30 September 2023
14:00

Netherlands	58–22	Norway
Tries: Longhurst (3'), Van Der Reek (12', 40'), Prins (25'), Johnston (38'), Thomson (41', 80'), Van Bokhoven (61'), Mudde (70'), Turnock (74'), Donnelly (77'); Goals: Mulligan (5/8), Thomson (2/3)	1st: 28–6; 2nd: 30–16; Report	Tries: Mellor-King (27', 57'), Høyland (54'), Olsen (69'); Goals: Mellor-King (3/4)

RC The Bassets, Sassenheim
Attendance: 229
Referee: Moray Gilland (Scotland)

Team details
Netherlands		Position	Norway
Name	Number	Position	Number	Name
Harry Mulligan	1	FB	1	Lucas Zuniga
Maas Van Der Reek	2	WG	2	Martin Høyland
Mike Prins	3	CE	3	Brett Harvey
Lucas Thomson	4	CE	4	Arne Oma Torsen
Hamish Wragg	5	WG	5	Frank Kiriinya
Lars Mudde	6	SO	6	Kristoffer Milligan
Will Johnston	7	SH	7	Jymaal Mellor-King
Tom Turnock	8	PR	8	Mathias Vada Stenseth-Holm
James Adams	9	HK	9	Robin Bjoernstad
Mauricio Gomez Pazos	10	PF	10	Nils Kristian Holte
Tom Van Bokhoven	11	SR	11	Marius Odland Sagelv
Rowan Schuiling	12	SR	12	Alexander John Ponton
Frank Longhurst	13	LF	13	Simon Olsen
Mitch Donnelly	14	IN	14	Andreas Vågen
Shadan Lavia	15	IN	15	Eric Mellor
Kees Kuijpers	16	IN	16	Stephen Mwikaria
Bonne Wilce	17	IN	17	Daniel Horne
Dave Hunter		Coach		Liam Stead

== October ==
=== Netherlands men vs Albania ===
7 October 2023

Netherlands	58–18	Albania
Tries: Donnelly, Prins (3), van Rossum (2), Koolstra, Ngirubiu, Van Bokhoven, Mulligan; Goals: Mulligan (9/10)	Report	Tries: Peposhi (2), Penxho; Goals: Peposhi (3/3)

Zaandijk RC, Amsterdam
Attendance: 234
Referee: Hans Verveer (Netherlands)

Team details
Netherlands		Position	Albania
Name	Number	Position	Number	Name
Harry Mulligan	1	FB	1	Olban Llapaj
Isaac Ngirubiu	2	WG	2	Silvio Cela
Maas Van Der Reek	3	CE	3	Albert Sheu
Mike Prins	4	CE	4	Dajan Shatraj
Daan van Rossum	5	WG	5	Vahid Hoxha
Laury Renac	6	SO	6	Kirstian Kondi
Will Johnston	7	SH	7	Ditmar Halla
Tom Van Bokhoven	8	PR	8	Arnaldo Telo
Mitch Donnelly	9	HK	9	Shaban Penxho
Soren Van Der Linden	10	PF	10	Girsjan Priska
Paul Kuijpers	11	SR	11	Orion Jucja
Lucas Thomson	12	SR	12	Elsajd Cubaj
Frank Longhurst	13	LF	13	Eliot Peposhi
Damon Koolstra	14	IN	14	Eugen Gucaj
Kees Kuijpers	15	IN	15	Neritan Tafili
Bonne Wilce	16	IN	16	Mariglen Nezaj
Shadan Lavia	17	IN
Dave Hunter		Coach		Arbian Peposhi

=== Malta men vs Italy in Australia ===
7 October 2023
15:30 AEDST (UTC+11:00)

Italy	38–12	Malta
Tries: Piccirilli (3), Iaria, Nati (2), Atkinson, Craparotta; Goals: Atkinson (1/3), Sapienza (1/3), Nati (1/2)	Report	Tries: McDermott, Cassel; Goals: Sammut (2/2)

Lidcombe Oval, Sydney
Referee: Gage Miles (Australia)

Team details
Italy		Position	Malta
Name	Number	Position	Number	Name
Daniel Atkinson	1	FB	1	Connor McDermott
Jack Piccirilli	2	WG	2	Logan Sipple
Kyle Pickering	3	CE	3	Zarrin Galea
Mason Iaria	4	CE	4	Jake Zammit
Damian Nati	5	WG	5	Lucas Borg
Joshua Natoli	6	FE/SO	6	Ryley Smith
Todd Sapienza	7	HB/SH	7	Jarrod Sammut
Luke Hodge	8	PR	8	Blake Phillips
Joseph Tramontana	9	HK	9	Jordan Xuereb
Anton Iaria	10	PF	10	Zachary Vella
Alexander Myles	11	SR	11	Tyler Cassel
Rinaldo Palumbo	12	SR	12	Kyle Cassel
Nicolas Lenaz	13	LK/LF	13	Anthony Bucca
Matthew Bonanno	14	IN	14	Carlo Cassar
Dominic Biondi	15	IN	15	Dylan Hodson
Matthew Craparotta	16	IN	16	Tyson Jackson
Bryce Magnone	17	IN	17	Ryan Azzopardi

=== Netherlands men in Serbia ===
14 October 2023
14:00 CEST (UTC+02:00)

Netherlands	40–10	Serbia
Tries: Adams, Prins, Kuijpers, Schuiling, Ngirubiu, Mulligan, Mudde; Goals: Mulligan (1/2), Thomson (5/6)	Report	Tries: Pavlovic, Trifunovic; Goals: Jasari (1/2)

RC Zwolle, Zwolle
Referee: Moray Gilland (Scotland)

Team details
Netherlands		Position	Serbia
Name	Number	Position	Number	Name
Harry Mulligan	1	FB	1	Dzavid Jasari
Isaac Ngirubiu	2	WG	2	Rajko Trifunovic
Rowan Schuiling	3	CE	3	Stefan Arsic
Mike Prins	4	CE	4	Aleksandar Pavlovic
Lars Mudde	5	WG	5	Marko Cuk
Laury Renac	6	SO	6	Nikola Djuric
Damon Koolstra	7	SH	7	Vojislav Dedic
Mauricio Gomez Pazos	8	PR	8	Marko Jankovic
James Adams	9	HK	9	Vuk Štrbac
Tom Turnock	10	PF	10	Milos Calic
Paul Kuijpers	11	SR	11	Miodrag Tomic
Lucas Thomson	12	SR	12	Strahinja Stojilkovic
Tom Van Bokhoven	13	LF	13	Enis Bibic
Mitch Donnelly	14	IN	14	Luka Ilic
Soren Van Der Linden	15	IN	15	Denis Cengaj
Frank Longhurst	16	IN	16	Vladica Nikolic
Bonne Wilce	17	IN	17	Vlado Kusic
Dave Hunter		Coach		Darren Fisher

=== Australia women vs New Zealand ===
14 October 2023
17:00 AEST (UTC+10:00)

Australia	16–10	New Zealand
Tries: Upton (2) 4', 31'; Johnston 25'; Goals: Brigginshaw (2/3) 5', 26'	Report	Tries: Biddle 12'; Hufanga 43'; Goals: McGregor (1/2) 44'

North Queensland Stadium, Townsville
Attendance: 12,067
Referee: Todd Smith (Australia)
Video Referee: Ashley Klein (Australia)
Touch judges: Belinda Sharpe (Australia), Darian Furner (Australia)

Team details
Australia		Position	New Zealand
Name	Number	Position	Number	Name
Tamika Upton	1	FB	1	Apii Nicholls
Jaime Chapman	2	WG	2	Annessa Biddle
Jessica Sergis	3	CE	3	Shanice Parker
Isabelle Kelly	4	CE	4	Mele Hufanga
Julia Robinson	5	WG	5	Leianne Tufuga
Tarryn Aiken	6	SO/FE	6	Ashleigh Quinlan
Ali Brigginshaw	7	SH/HB	7	Raecene McGregor
Shannon Mato	8	PR	8	Mya Hill-Moana
Keeley Davis	9	HK	9	Brooke Anderson
Jessika Elliston	10	PF	10	Angelina Teakaraanga-Katoa
Kezie Apps	11	SR	11	Otesa Pule
Olivia Kernick	12	SR	12	Laishon Albert-Jones
Simaima Taufa	13	LF/LK	13	Georgia Hale
Emma Tonegato	14	IN	14	Tyla Nathan-Wong
Caitlan Johnston	15	IN	15	Najvada George
Kennedy Cherrington	16	IN	16	Jasmine Fogavini
Lauren Brown	18	IN	17	Amelia Pasikala
Shaylee Bent	17	RES	18	Abigail Roache

=== Pacific Cup ===
14 October 2023
19:10 AEST (UTC+10:00)

Australia	38–12	Samoa
Tries: Haas 4'; Tedesco 9'; Fa'asuamaleaui 12'; Murray 15'; Tabuai-Fidow (2) 39', 54'; Staggs 79' c Goals: Staggs (5/7) 5', 13', 17', 40', 80'	1st: 28–6; 2nd: 10–6; Report	Tries: Taulagi 18'; Leilua 72'; Goals: Crichton (2/2) 20', 74'

North Queensland Stadium, Townsville
Attendance: 18,144
Referee: Grant Atkins (Australia)
Video Referee: Ashley Klein (Australia)
Touch judges: Phil Henderson (Australia), Wyatt Raymond (Australia)

Team details
Australia		Position	Samoa
Name	Number	Position	Number	Name
James Tedesco	1	FB	1	Sualauvi Faalogo
Dylan Edwards	2	WG	2	Murray Taulagi
Hamiso Tabuai-Fidow	3	CE	3	Izack Tago
Kotoni Staggs	4	CE	4	Young Tonumaipea
Selwyn Cobbo	5	WG	5	Brian To'o
Cameron Munster	6	SO/FE	6	Stephen Crichton
Daly Cherry-Evans	7	SH/HB	7	Daejarn Asi
Payne Haas	8	PR	8	Stefano Utoikamanu
Ben Hunt	9	HK	19	Justin Matamua
Tino Fa'asuamaleaui	10	PF	10	Junior Paulo
Cameron Murray	11	SR	11	Luciano Leilua
Liam Martin	12	SR	12	Connelly Lemuelu
Isaah Yeo	13	LF/LK	13	Keenan Palasia
Harry Grant	14	IN	9	Gordon Chan Kum Tong
Lindsay Collins	15	IN	14	Spencer Leniu
Patrick Carrigan	16	IN	15	Terrell May
Reuben Cotter	17	IN	16	Heilum Luki
Nicho Hynes	18	RES	18	Royce Hunt
Mal Meninga		Coach		Ben Gardiner

21 October 2023
18:00 NZDT (UTC+13:00)

New Zealand	50–0	Samoa
Tries: Isaako (2) 13', 24'; Hughes 22'; Asofa-Solomona 44'; Papali'i 48'; Mulitalo (2) 60', 73'; Nikora 63' c Fisher-Harris 76'; Goals: Isaako (7/9) 14', 23', 26', 45', 65', 75', 78'	1st: 18–0; 2nd: 32–0; Report

Eden Park, Auckland
Attendance: 23,269
Referee: Gerard Sutton (Australia)
Touch judges: Dave Munro (Australia), Chris Sutton (Australia)

Team details
New Zealand		Position	Samoa
Name	Number	Position	Number	Name
Charnze Nicoll-Klokstad	1	FB	1	Sualauvi Faalogo
Ronaldo Mulitalo	2	WG	2	Murray Taulagi
Matthew Timoko	3	CE	4	Marion Seve
Joseph Manu	4	CE	21	Tommy Talau
Jamayne Isaako	5	WG	20	Greg Marzhew
Dylan Brown	6	SO/FE	6	Stephen Crichton
Jahrome Hughes	7	SH/HB	7	Daejarn Asi
James Fisher-Harris	8	PR	8	Stefano Utoikamanu
Kieran Foran	14	HK	9	Gordon Chan Kum Tong
Moses Leota	10	PF	10	Junior Paulo
Isaiah Papali'i	11	SR	11	Luciano Leilua
Briton Nikora	12	SR	16	Heilum Luki
Joseph Tapine	13	LF/LK	14	Spencer Leniu
Fa'amanu Brown	9	IN	13	Keenan Palasia
Nelson Asofa-Solomona	15	IN	15	Terrell May
Griffin Neame	16	IN	18	Royce Hunt
Leo Thompson	17	IN	19	Ronald Volkman
Naufahu Whyte	18	RES	17	Justin Matamua
Michael Maguire		Coach		Ben Gardiner

28 October 2023
20:10 AEDT (UTC+11:00)

Australia	36–18	New Zealand
Tries: Holmes 8'; Collins (2) 21', 30'; Edwards 50'; Hunt 77'; Murray 79'; Goals: Holmes (6/7) 9', 22', 31', 51', 65', 78'	1st: 18–12; 2nd: 18–6; Report	Tries: Nikora 17'; Mulitalo 38'; Brown 69'; Goals: Isaako (3/3) 19', 39', 71'

Melbourne Rectangular Stadium, Melbourne
Attendance: 20,584
Referee: Adam Gee (Australia)
Touch judges: Ziggy Przeklasa-Adamski (Australia), Drew Oultram (Australia)

Team details
Australia		Position	New Zealand
Name	Number	Position	Number	Name
James Tedesco	1	FB	1	Charnze Nicoll-Klokstad
Dylan Edwards	2	WG	2	Ronaldo Mulitalo
Hamiso Tabuai-Fidow	3	CE	3	Matthew Timoko
Kotoni Staggs	4	CE	4	Joseph Manu
Valentine Holmes	5	WG	5	Jamayne Isaako
Cameron Munster	6	SO/FE	6	Dylan Brown
Daly Cherry-Evans	7	SH/HB	7	Jahrome Hughes
Jake Trbojevic	8	PR	8	James Fisher-Harris
Ben Hunt	9	HK	9	Kieran Foran
Thomas Flegler	10	PF	10	Moses Leota
Cameron Murray	11	SR	11	Isaiah Papali'i
Reuben Cotter	12	SR	12	Briton Nikora
Isaah Yeo	13	LF/LK	13	Joseph Tapine
Harry Grant	14	IN	14	Fa'amanu Brown
Lindsay Collins	15	IN	15	Nelson Asofa-Solomona
Patrick Carrigan	16	IN	16	Griffin Neame
Nicho Hynes	17	IN	17	Leo Thompson
Liam Martin	18	RES	18	Naufahu Whyte
Mal Meninga		Coach		Michael Maguire

Final

4 November 2023
17:00 NZDT (UTC+13:00)

Australia	0–30	New Zealand
	1st: 0–12; 2nd: 0–18; Report	Tries: Mulitalo 14'; Isaako (2) 34', 47'; Timoko 59'; Neame 70'; Goals: Isaako (4/5) 16', 35', 61', 72'; Field goals: Isaako (1/1) 67'

FMG Stadium Waikato, Hamilton
Attendance: 13,269
Referee: Adam Gee (Australia)
Touch judges: Dave Munro (Australia), Chris Sutton (Australia)

Team details
Australia		Position	New Zealand
Name	Number	Position	Number	Name
James Tedesco	1	FB	1	Charnze Nicoll-Klokstad
Dylan Edwards	2	WG	2	Ronaldo Mulitalo
Hamiso Tabuai-Fidow	3	CE	3	Matthew Timoko
Kotoni Staggs	4	CE	4	Joseph Manu
Valentine Holmes	5	WG	5	Jamayne Isaako
Cameron Munster	6	SO/FE	6	Dylan Brown
Daly Cherry-Evans	7	SH/HB	7	Jahrome Hughes
Payne Haas	8	PR	8	James Fisher-Harris
Ben Hunt	9	HK	9	Kieran Foran
Tino Fa'asuamaleaui	10	PF	10	Moses Leota
Liam Martin	12	SR	11	Isaiah Papali'i
Reuben Cotter	17	SR	12	Briton Nikora
Isaah Yeo	13	LF/LK	13	Joseph Tapine
Harry Grant	14	IN	14	Fa'amanu Brown
Lindsay Collins	15	IN	15	Nelson Asofa-Solomona
Patrick Carrigan	16	IN	16	Griffin Neame
Nicho Hynes	18	IN	17	Leo Thompson
Thomas Flegler	19	RES	18	Naufahu Whyte
Mal Meninga		Coach		Michael Maguire

=== Fiji women vs Samoa in Papua New Guinea ===
15 October 2023
12:45 AEST (UTC+10:00)

Samoa	26–12	Fiji
Tries: Tui (2) 10', 42'; Mapusua (2) 21', 68'; Nu'uausala 31'; Goals: Piliae-Rasabale (3/5) 22', 32', 70'	Report	Tries: Naikore 5', 54'; Namoce 57'

PNG Football Stadium, Port Moresby
Referee: Liam Kennedy (Australia)
Video Referee: Chris Butler (Australia)
Touch judges: David Munro (Australia), Chris Sutton (Australia)

Team details
Samoa		Position	Fiji
Name	Number	Position	Number	Name
Destiny Mino-Sinapati	1	FB	1	Cassie Staples
Taylor Mapusua	2	WG	2	Vitalina Naikore
Petesa Lio	3	CE	3	Merewalesi Rokouno
Niall Williams-Guthrie	4	CE	4	Patricia Raikadroka
Lindsay Tui	5	WG	5	Asena Rokomaram
Pauline Piliae-Rasabale	6	SO/FE	6	Sienna Laing
Sienna Lofipo	7	SH/HB	7	Sereana Naitokatoka
Fiona Jahnke	8	PR	8	Aliti Namoce
Destiny Brill	9	HK	9	Teaghan Laing
Janelle Williams	10	PF	10	Anastacia Shum-Cottrell
Malaela Sua	12	SR	11	Talei Holmes
Onjeurlina Hunt	15	SR	12	Emma Rainima
Annetta-Claudia Nu'uasala	13	LF/LK	13	Josephine Maejiirs
Pihuka Berryman-Duff	16	IN	14	Siniva Sa'anga
Tafao Asaua	18	IN	15	Grace Waqa
Tamerah Leati	19	IN	16	Mere Kilawekana
Makayla Eli	21	IN	17	Adi Sokula Waqa
Sauleone Saipele	17	RES	18	Alesi Kilawekana

=== Pacific Bowl ===
15 October 2023
15:00 PNGST (UTC+10:00)

Papua New Guinea	46–10	Cook Islands
Tries: Z. Laybutt 7', 39'; Derby 12'; Kapinias 15'; Richard 22'; Macdonald 26', 41', 42', 76'; Goals: Z. Laybutt (5/9) 14', 16', 23', 41', 44'	1st: 30–0; 2nd: 16–10; Report	Tries: E. Ioka 48'; S. Marsters 58'; Goals: E. Ioka (1/1) 60'; Takairangi (0/1)

PNG Football Stadium, Port Moresby
Attendance: 7,133
Referee: Peter Gough (Australia)
Video Referee: Chris Butler (Australia)
Touch judges: Ziggy Przeklasa-Adamski (Australia), Drew Oultram (Australia)

Team details
Papua New Guinea		Position	Cook Islands
Name	Number	Position	Number	Name
Alex Johnston	1	FB	1	Esom Ioka
Robert Derby	2	WG	2	Malachi Morgan
Zac Laybutt	3	CE	3	Kayal Iro
Rodrick Tai	4	CE	4	Esan Marsters
Nene Macdonald	5	WG	5	Steven Marsters
Kyle Laybutt	6	SO/FE	6	Brad Takairangi
Lachlan Lam	7	SH/HB	7	Tevin Arona
Epel Kapinias	8	PR	8	Davy Moale
Judah Rimbu	9	HK	9	Rua Ngatikaura
Valentine Richard	10	PF	10	Makahesi Makatoa
Jacob Alick	11	SR	11	Zane Tetevano
Dan Russell	12	SR	12	Reuben Porter
Jack De Belin	13	LF/LK	13	Pride Petterson-Robati
Liam Horne	14	IN	15	Rhys Dakin
Nixon Putt	15	IN	16	Justin Estall-Makirere
Junior Rop	16	IN	17	Kadiyae Ioka
Benji Kot	17	IN	18	Takai Mokohar
Cruise Ten	18	RES	14	William Samuel

22 October 2023
15:00 PNGST (UTC+10:00)

Fiji	22–18	Cook Islands
Tries: Sivo 24'; Bula 55'; Blake 67'; Turuva 74'; Goals: Wakeham (3/4) 56', 68', 75'	1st: 4–6; 2nd: 18–12; Report	Tries: E. Marsters 18'; E. Ioka 46'; Cooper-Tetevano 71'; Goals: S. Marsters (3/3) 19', 47', 72'

PNG Football Stadium, Port Moresby
Attendance: 7,001
Referee: Ashley Klein (Australia)
Touch judges: Liam Kennedy (Australia), Todd Smith (Australia)

Team details
Fiji		Position	Cook Islands
Name	Number	Position	Number	Name
Jahream Bula	1	FB	1	Esom Ioka
Maika Sivo	2	WG	2	Malachi Morgan
Sunia Turuva	3	CE	3	Kayal Iro
Waqa Blake	4	CE	4	Alvin Maungaati
Mikaele Ravalawa	5	WG	5	Steven Marsters
Kurt Donoghoe	6	SO/FE	6	Brad Takairangi
Brandon Wakeham	7	SH/HB	7	Esan Marsters
Tui Kamikamica	8	PR	8	Davvy Moale
Noah Nailagoliva	14	HK	9	Rua Ngatikaura
Gordon Whippy	16	PF	17	Takai Mokohar
Kitione Kautoga	11	SR	11	Zane Tetevano
Taane Milne	13	SR	12	Reuben Porter
Caleb Navale	15	LF/LK	13	Pride Petterson-Robati
Penioni Tagituimua	9	IN	10	William Samuel
Apisalome Saukuru	12	IN	14	Kadiyae Ioka
Watisoni Waqanisaravi	17	IN	15	Rhys Dakin
Sirilo Lovokuro	20	IN	16	Justin Estall-Makirere
Pio Seci	21	RES

29 October 2023
15:00 PNGST (UTC+10:00)

Papua New Guinea	16–43	Fiji
Tries: Johnston 2'; Kot 61'; Kapinias 72'; Goals: Martin (2/3) 62', 73'	1st: 4–19; 2nd: 12–24; Report	Tries: Donoghoe (2) 12', 32'; Kamikamica 17'; Sivo (2) 46', 48'; Navale 55'; Qareqare 65'; Goals: Wakeham (7/8) 13', 18', 33', 48', 57', 66', 69'; Field goals: Wakeham (1/1) 39'

PNG Football Stadium, Port Moresby
Attendance: 14,546
Referee: Ashley Klein (Australia)
Touch judges: Peter Gough (Australia), Phil Henderson (Australia)

Team details
Papua New Guinea		Position	Fiji
Name	Number	Position	Number	Name
Alex Johnston	1	FB	1	Jahream Bula
Robert Derby	2	WG	2	Maika Sivo
Zac Laybutt	3	CE	4	Waqa Blake
Benji Kot	4	CE	5	Mikaele Ravalawa
Nene Macdonald	5	WG	18	Jason Qareqare
Kyle Laybutt	6	SO/FE	6	Kurt Donoghoe
Lachlan Lam	7	SH/HB	7	Brandon Wakeham
Epel Kapinias	8	PR	8	Tui Kamikamica
Edwin Ipape	9	HK	9	Penioni Tagituimua
Valentine Richard	10	PF	10	King Vuniyayawa
Rhyse Martin	11	SR	12	Apisalome Saukuru
Daniel Russell	12	SR	13	Taane Milne
Jack de Belin	13	LF/LK	15	Caleb Navale
Judah Rimbu	14	IN	14	Noah Nailagoliva
Wellington Albert	15	IN	16	Gordon Whippy
Keven Appo	16	IN	19	Mesake Ravonu
Jacob Alick	17	IN	20	Sirilo Lovokuro
Liam Horne	18	RES	21	Pio Seci
Justin Holbrook		Coach		Waisake Kativerata

Final

5 November 2023
15:00 PNGST (UTC+10:00)

Fiji	12–32	Papua New Guinea
Tries: Blake (2) 42', 68'; Goals: Wakeham (2/2) 42', 69'	1st: 0–26; 2nd: 12–6; Report	Tries: Ipape 15'; Derby (2) 23', 28'; Johnston 38'; Kapinias 75'; Goals: Martin (5/5) 16', 25', 29', 39', 77'

PNG Football Stadium, Port Moresby
Attendance: 14,809
Referee: Grant Atkins (Australia)
Touch judges: Liam Kennedy (Australia), Todd Smith (Australia)

Team details
Fiji		Position	Papua New Guinea
Name	Number	Position	Number	Name
Jahream Bula	1	FB	1	Alex Johnston
Maika Sivo	2	WG	2	Robert Derby
Waqa Blake	4	CE	3	Zac Laybutt
Mikaele Ravalawa	5	CE	4	Rodrick Tai
Jason Qareqare	18	WG	5	Nene Macdonald
Kurt Donoghoe	6	SO/FE	6	Kyle Laybutt
Brandon Wakeham	7	SH/HB	7	Lachlan Lam
Tui Kamikamica	8	PR	8	Epel Kapinias
Penioni Tagituimua	9	HK	9	Edwin Ipape
King Vuniyayawa	10	PF	10	Valentine Richard
Apisalome Saukuru	12	SR	11	Rhyse Martin
Taane Milne	13	SR	12	Daniel Russell
Caleb Navale	15	LF/LK	13	Jack de Belin
Kitione Kautoga	11	IN	14	Judah Rimbu
Gordon Whippy	16	IN	15	Liam Horne
Watisoni Waqanisaravi	17	IN	16	Junior Rop
Pio Seci	21	IN	17	Nixon Putt
Sirilo Lovokuro	20	RES	18	Jacob Alick
Waisake Kativerata		Coach		Justin Holbrook

=== New Zealand women vs Tonga ===
21 October 2023
15:45 NZDT (UTC+13:00)

New Zealand	28–10	Tonga
Tries: Roache (3) 5', 10', 46'; Pasikala 38'; Hufanga 58'; Goals: McGregor (2/6) 12', 40'	Report	Tries: Penitani (2) 25', 55'; Goals: Hifo (1/2) 27'

Eden Park, Auckland
Attendance: ≈10,000
Referee: Wyatt Raymond (Australia)

Team details
New Zealand		Position	Tonga
Name	Number	Position	Number	Name
Shanice Parker	1	FB	1	Langi Vaeinu
Cheyelle Robins-Reti	2	WG	2	Lavinia Tauhalaliku
Mele Hufanga	3	CE	3	China Polata
Abigail Roache	4	CE	4	Litia Fusi
Leianne Tufuga	5	WG	5	Haylee Hifo
Tyla Nathan-Wong	6	SO/FE	6	Cassey Tohi-Hiku
Raecene McGregor	7	SH/HB	7	Tiana Penitani
Mya Hill-Moana	8	PR	8	Folau Vaki
Brooke Anderson	9	HK	14	Jade Fonua
Angelina Teakaraanga-Katoa	10	PF	10	Tegan Dymock
Otesa Pule	11	SR	11	Amelia Mafi
Annessa Biddle	12	SR	12	Vanessa Foliaki
Georgia Hale	13	LF/LK	13	Dannii Perese
Capri Paekau	14	IN	9	Seli Mailangi
Najvada George	15	IN	15	Natasha Penitani
Amelia Pasikala	16	IN	16	Ilaisaane Taufa
Tiana Davison	17	IN	17	Shannon Muru
Jasmine Fogavini	18	RES	18	Fatafehi Hanisi

=== Malta men vs Chile in Australia ===
21 October 2023
13:00 AEDT (UTC+11:00)

Malta	30–22	Chile
Tries: K Cassel, Galea, Jackson, Borg (2); Goals: T Cassel (2/2), Xuereb (3/3)	1st: 6–10; 2nd: 24–12; Report	Tries: Graham, Fisher, Becerra, Black; Goals: Black (3/3)

Forshaw Park, Sydney
Referee: Matt Galvin (Australia)

Team details
Malta		Position	Chile
Name	Number	Position	Number	Name
Zarrin Galea	1	FB	1	Javier Ramirez Ley
Lucas Borg	2	WG	2	Christian Sandoval
Logan Sipple	3	CE	3	Sebastian De La Paz
Bryson Demanuele	4	CE	4	Zane Artesi
Eli Foote	5	WG	5	Jayden Jorquera
Jordan Xuereb	6	SO/FE	6	Mitch Black
Jayden Azzopardi	7	SH/HB	7	James Horvat
Zachery Vella	8	PR	8	Brandon Tobar
Luke Huth	9	HK	9	Nick Doberer
Kyal Greene	10	PF	10	Diego Becerra
Tyler Cassel	11	SR	11	Harry Croker
Kyle Cassel	12	SR	12	Diego Bravo Graham
Anthony Bucca	13	LF/LK	13	Austin Olivares
Riley Tonna	14	IN	14	Ben Fisher
Carlo Cassar	15	IN	15	Chris Castillo
Tyson Jackson	16	IN	16	Alvaro Avaria Jiminez
Dylan Hodson	17	IN	17	Mauricio Reyes Vega
Aaron McDonald		Coach

=== Poland men vs North Macedonia in Australia ===
21 October 2023
15:00 AEDT (UTC+11:00)

North Macedonia	8–40	Poland
Tries: Foye, Gouganovski	1st: 0–16; 2nd: 8–24; Report	Tries: Siejka, Z Lipowicz, Gromek, Niszczot, Watene-Zelezniak, Stachnik, R Lipowicz; Goals: Siejka (6/7)

Forshaw Park, Sydney
Referee: Blake Williams (Australia)

Team details
North Macedonia		Position	Poland
Name	Number	Position	Number	Name
Elia Georgievski	1	FB	1	Callum Gromek
Angelo Avramovski	2	WG	2	Daniel Stiff
Xanda Georgievski	3	CE	3	Malakai Watene-Zelezniak
Aledin Hrvat	4	CE	4	Ethan Niszczot
Jayden Gouganovski	5	WG	5	Reece Lipowicz
Mitchel Stojanoski	6	SO/FE	6	Matthew Stachnik
James Suleski	7	SH/HB	7	Harrison Siejka
Jayden Foye	8	PR	8	Mitchell Shaw
Jake Mitrevski	9	HK	9	Arek Werstak
James Mirceski	10	PF	10	Norbert Bałaciński
Aleks Stojkovski	11	SR	11	Chippie Korostchuk
Jamie Miletic	12	SR	12	Simon Maslanka
Josh Kosteski	13	LF/LK	13	Zac Lipowicz
Aleks Srbinovski	14	IN	14	Lochlan Srama
Josh Boicheski	15	IN	15	Brayden Tyburski
Justin Miletec	16	IN	16	Tynan Forster
		IN	17	Adam Artsivourtsis

=== Griffin Cup ===
Griffin Cup

21 October 2023
14:00 CET (UTC+01:00)

Germany	18–44	Netherlands
Tries: Kramer (4); Goals: Rau (1/4)	1st: 4–22; 2nd: 14–22; Report	Tries: Donnelly (6), Mulligan, Ngirubiu; Goals: Mulligan (6/8)

Althoffstadion, Hattingen
Attendance: ≈800
Referee: Henry Winnard (England)

Team details
Germany		Position	Holland
Name	Number	Position	Number	Name
Brian Kikawa	1	FB	1	Harry Mulligan
Dorotej-Dado Arnold	2	WG	2	Isaac Ngirubiu
Sebastian Paaßen	3	CE	3	Mike Prins
Felix Rau	4	CE	4	Mitch Donnelly
Fabian Kramer	5	WG	5	Hamish Wragg
Liam Doughton	6	SO	6	Will Johnston
Alex Nyahoe	7	SH	7	Damon Koolstra
Mawuli Amefia	8	PR	8	Mauricio Gomez Pazos
Harry Cartwright	9	HK	9	James Adams
Kilian Martin	10	PF	10	Bonne Wilce
Martin Tormann	11	SR	11	Lucas Thomson
Eoin Bowie	12	SR	12	Tom Van Bokhoven
Jimmy Keinhorst	13	LF	13	Frank Longhurst
Alexej Petry	14	IN	14	Daan van Rossum
Max Alderson	15	IN	15	Tom Turnock
Charlie Tetley	16	IN	16	Soren Van Der Linden
Dany Doukeng	17	IN	17	Shadan Lavia
		Coach		Dave Hunter

=== Papua New Guinea women vs Cook Islands ===
22 October 2023
12:45 AEST (UTC+10:00)

Papua New Guinea	28–20	Cook Islands
Tries: Kapo 9'; Banu 18'; Allan (2) 22', 48'; Kerowa 34'; Norris 44'; Goals: Veivers (2/6) 10', 20'	Report	Tries: Makira 14'; Rewi 26'; Takairangi 58'; Holloway-Samuels 63'; Goals: Kiria-Ratu (2/4) 16', 65'

PNG Football Stadium, Port Moresby
Attendance: 7,001
Referee: Belinda Sharpe (Australia)

Team details
Papua New Guinea		Position	Cook Islands
Name	Number	Position	Number	Name
Latoniya Norris	1	FB	1	Kiana Takairangi
Lyiannah Allan	2	WG	2	Alesha Willcox
Belinda Gwasamum	3	CE	3	Kaiyah Atai
Shellie Long	4	CE	4	Chantelle Holloway-Samuels
Freda Waula	5	WG	5	Mahinaarangi Rewi
Sera Koroi	6	SO/FE	6	Chantay Kiria-Ratu
Ua Ravu	7	SH/HB	7	Lydia Turua-Quedley
Gloria Kaupa	10	PR	8	Ngatokotoru Arakua
Roswita Kapo	9	HK	9	Chelsea Makira
Jessikah Reeves	13	PF	10	Crystal Tamarua
Emily Vievers	11	SR	11	Jazmon Tupou-Witchman
Essay Banu	12	SR	14	Kerehitina Matua
Bertshiba Awoi	16	LF/LK	13	Anneka Stephens
Meli Joe	14	IN	12	Ariel Ngatoko
Sareka Mooka	15	IN	15	Paulina Morris-Ponga
Yolanda Taute	17	IN	16	Lavinia Kitai
Leila Kerowa	19	IN	17	Jodeci Joseph
Lancy Ulkambane	18	RES	18	Kiana Sword-Tua

=== England men vs Tonga ===
22 October 2023
14:30 BST (UTC+01:00)

England	22–18	Tonga
Tries: King, Lewis, Johnstone (2); Goals: Lewis (1/1), Smith (2/3)	1st: 12–12; 2nd: 10–6; Report	Tries: To'a, Frizell, Koula; Goals: Katoa (3/4)

Totally Wicked Stadium, St Helens
Attendance: 12,898
Referee: Liam Moore (England)
Touch judges: Jonnie Roberts (England), Jack Smith (England)
Player of the Match: Mikey Lewis (England)

Team details
England		Position	Tonga
Name	Number	Position	Number	Name
Jack Welsby	1	FB	1	Will Hopoate
Tommy Makinson	2	WG	2	Starford To'a
Harry Newman	3	CE	3	Will Penisini
Toby King	4	CE	4	Moses Suli
Tom Johnstone	5	WG	5	Toluta'u Koula
Mikey Lewis	6	SO/FE	6	Tui Lolohea
Harry Smith	7	SH/HB	7	Isaiya Katoa
Tom Burgess	8	PR	8	Addin Fonua-Blake
Daryl Clark	9	HK	9	Siliva Havili
Mike McMeeken	10	PF	10	Moeaki Fotuaika
John Bateman	11	SR	11	Tyson Frizell
Elliott Whitehead	12	SR	12	Keaon Koloamatangi
Victor Radley	13	LF/LK	13	Felise Kaufusi
Danny Walker	14	IN	14	Dion Teaupa
Morgan Knowles	15	IN	15	Tevita Tatola
Matty Lees	16	IN	16	Haumole Olakau'atu
Chris Hill	17	IN	17	Hame Sele
Liam Farrell	18	RES	18	Eliesa Katoa
Shaun Wane		Coach		Kristian Woolf

28 October 2023
14:30 BST (UTC+01:00)

England	14–4	Tonga
Tries: Ashton (2); Goals: Smith (3/4)	1st: 12–0; 2nd: 2–4; Report	Tries: Koula

Kirklees Stadium, Huddersfield
Attendance: 11,210
Referee: Jack Smith (England)
Touch judges: Chris Kendall (England), Rich Thompson (England)

Team details
England		Position	Tonga
Name	Number	Position	Number	Name
Jack Welsby	1	FB	1	Will Hopoate
Matty Ashton	2	WG	2	Junior Tupou
Harry Newman	3	CE	3	Will Penisini
Toby King	4	CE	4	Moses Suli
Tom Johnstone	5	WG	5	Toluta'u Koula
Mikey Lewis	6	SO/FE	6	Tui Lolohea
Harry Smith	7	SH/HB	7	Isaiya Katoa
Tom Burgess	8	PR	8	Addin Fonua-Blake
Daryl Clark	9	HK	9	Siliva Havili
Matty Lees	10	PF	10	Tevita Tatola
John Bateman	11	SR	11	Tyson Frizell
Elliott Whitehead	12	SR	12	Haumole Olakau'atu
Victor Radley	13	LF/LK	13	Felise Kaufusi
Danny Walker	14	IN	14	Dion Teaupa
Liam Farrell	15	IN	15	Moeaki Fotuaika
Chris Hill	16	IN	16	Keaon Koloamatangi
Mike McMeeken	17	IN	17	Eliesa Katoa
Ben Currie	18	RES	18	Hame Sele
Shaun Wane		Coach		Kristian Woolf

4 November 2023
14:30 GMT (UTC±00:00)

England	26–4	Tonga
Tries: Currie, Ashton, Whitehead, Newman; Goals: Smith (5/5)	1st: 14–0; 2nd: 12–4; Report	Tries: E. Katoa (68')

Headingley Stadium, Leeds
Attendance: 15,477
Referee: Chris Kendall (England)
Touch judges: Liam Rush (England), Warren Turley (England)

Team details
England		Position	Tonga
Name	Number	Position	Number	Name
Jack Welsby	1	FB	1	Will Hopoate
Tom Johnstone	2	WG	2	Will Penisini
Harry Newman	3	CE	3	Konrad Hurrell
Ben Currie	4	CE	4	Moses Suli
Matty Ashton	5	WG	5	Toluta'u Koula
George Williams	6	SO/FE	6	Tuimoala Lolohea
Harry Smith	7	SH/HB	7	Isaiya Katoa
Tom Burgess	8	PR	8	Hame Sele
Daryl Clark	9	HK	9	Siliva Havili
Matty Lees	10	PF	10	Felise Kaufusi
John Bateman	11	SR	11	Tyson Frizell
Elliot Whitehead	12	SR	12	Haumole Olakau’atu
Robbie Mulhern	13	LF/LK	13	Keaon Koloamatangi
Danny Walker	14	IN	14	Latu Fainu
Tyler Dupree	15	IN	15	Moeaki Fotuaika
Chris Hill	16	IN	16	Eliesa Katoa
Mike McMeeken	17	IN	17	Siua Wong
Shaun Wane		Coach		Kristian Woolf

=== Australia women vs New Zealand ===
28 October 2023
18:00 AEDT (UTC+11:00)

Australia	6–12	New Zealand
Tries: Chapman 9'; Goals: Brown (1/1) 10'	Report	Tries: Hufanga 34'; Tufuga 62'; Goals: McGregor (2/2) 35', 64'

Melbourne Rectangular Stadium, Melbourne
Attendance: 10,536
Referee: Belinda Sharpe (Australia)

Team details
Australia		Position	New Zealand
Name	Number	Position	Number	Name
Tamika Upton	1	FB	1	Apii Nicholls
Jaime Chapman	2	WG	2	Leianne Tufuga
Jessica Sergis	3	CE	3	Mele Hufanga
Isabelle Kelly	4	CE	4	Abigail Roache
Jakiya Whitfeld	5	WG	5	Shanice Parker
Tarryn Aiken	6	SO/FE	6	Tyla Nathan-Wong
Ali Brigginshaw	7	SH/HB	7	Raecene McGregor
Shannon Mato	8	PR	10	Angelina Teakaraanga-Katoa
Lauren Brown	9	HK	9	Brooke Anderson
Kezie Apps	11	PF	15	Najvada George
Olivia Kernick	12	SR	11	Annessa Biddle
Yasmin Clydsdale	15	SR	12	Otesa Pule
Simaima Taufa	13	LF/LK	13	Georgia Hale
Jessika Elliston	10	IN	8	Mya Hill-Moana
Emma Tonegato	14	IN	14	Ashleigh Quinlan
Kennedy Cherrington	16	IN	16	Jasmine Fogavini
Emma Manzelmann	17	IN	17	Tiana Davison
Shaylee Bent	18	RES	18	Laishon Albert-Jones

=== Philippines woman vs Malta in Australia ===
28 October 2023
13:30 AEST (UTC+10:00)

Malta	0–42	Philippines
	1st: 0–20; 2nd: 0–22; Report	Tries: Wells, Koch, Condon, Ellem, Rickett; Goals: Condon (3/5), Jamieson (2/3)

New Era Stadium, Sydney
Referee: Alexander Pruscino (Australia)

Team details
Philippines		Position	Malta
Name	Number	Position	Number	Name
Takiah Buchanan	1	FB	1	Sarah Dimech
Jilena Grant	2	WG	2	Bianca Smith
Leah Ellem	3	CE	3	Chloe Saliba
Linae Williams	4	CE	4	Christine Gaudiosi
Tynia Wells	5	WG	5	Emily Vella
Natalie Webb	6	SO	6	Keisha Waite
Cassandra Koch	7	SH	7	Maria Gregory
Charlene Vaughan	8	PR	8	Nicole Gusman
Payge Louise Condon	9	HK	9	Molly Mamo
Meagan Rickett	10	PF	10	Ashlei Grande
Jacky Lyden	11	SR	11	Taylah Vella
Janine Jamieson	12	SR	12	Victoria Coppini
Renee Targett	13	LF	13	Jamsmine Dooley
Alana-Lee Grace	14	IN	14	Amey Galea
Tammy Fletcher	15	IN	15	Kristen Grima
Roslyn Lye	16	IN	16	Chantelle Leishman
Erica Rowell	17	IN	17	Dana Buttigiega
		Coach		Alysha Janssen

=== Philippines men vs Malta in Australia ===
28 October 2023
15:30 AEST (UTC+10:00)

Malta	46–22	Philippines
Tries: Tonna, Smith, Hodson, Borg, Sipple; Goals: Demanuele (7/7)	1st: 30–16; 2nd: 16–6; Report	Tries: Stephenson, Reyes, Jones; Goals: Forrest (3/4)

New Era Stadium, Sydney
Referee: Rami Abu Mansour (Australia)

Team details
Malta		Position	Philippines
Name	Number	Position	Number	Name
Bryson Demanuele	1	FB	1	Isaac Rosario
Lucas Borg	2	WG	2	Isaac Acheampong
Zarrin Galea	3	CE	3	Ned Stephenson
Logan Sipple	4	CE	4	Dennis Gordon
Elie Foote	5	WG	5	Bailey Page
Jayden Smith	6	SO	6	Tyrone O'Leary
Zac Vella	7	SH	7	Nikolas Forrest
Riley Tonna	8	PR	8	Dylan Jones
Kyal Greene	9	HK	9	Tyrone Tootell
Braydon Sherry	10	PF	10	Ian Nelson
Dylan Hodson	11	SR	11	Ricky Kaucia
Anthony Bucca	12	SR	12	Jordan Jones
Jordan Xuereb	13	LF	13	Jeffery Vaughan
Will Exton	14	IN	14	Gerald Reyes
Aaron Weston	15	IN	15	Jeromy Cairns
Tyson Jackson	16	IN	16	Mack Selwood
Luke Sherry	17	IN	17	Benjamin Jegede
Ben Sammut		Coach

=== Greece men vs Ukraine ===
Unity Cup

28 October 2023
16:00 EET (UTC+2:00)

Greece	24–38	Ukraine
Tries: Meads 4', 25', Kartsonakis 48', Koulizakis 75'; Goals: Stratis (4/4)	1st: 12–10; 2nd: 12–28; Report	Tries: Kolisnyk 15', Dulia 20', Shcherbyna 53', Checheta 58', Semerenko 62', Trusov 66', Troian 72'; Goals: Skorbach (5/7)

Gkorytsa Stadium, Athens
Referee: Roman Bykhov (Ukraine)

Team details
Greece		Position	Ukraine
Name	Number	Position	Number	Name
Dimosthenis Kartsonakis	1	FB	1	Danylo Vedler
Sam Stratis	2	WG	2	Taras Kolisnyk
Konstantinos Katsidonis	3	CE	3	Mykhailo Troian
Panos Varypatis	4	CE	4	Liubomyr Beznoshchuk
Stefanos Morellas	5	WG	5	Orest Adamyk
Nikolaos Bosmos	6	SO	6	Oleksandr Skorbach
Jordan Meads	7	SH	7	Dmytro Semerenko
Stefanos Bastas	8	PR	8	Ostap Hryshchenko
Liam Sue-Tin Kentrotis	9	HK	9	Yevhen Checheta
Vasilis Tsikrikas	10	PF	10	Volodymyr Karpenko
Nicholas Flocas	11	SR	11	Volodymyr Mashkin
Nick Tuliatu	12	SR	12	Yevhenii Trusov
Aris Koulizakis	13	LF	13	Oleksandr Shcherbyna
Aris Dardamanis	14	IN	14	Ihor Yurkin
Myles Gal	15	IN	15	Oleksandr Syvokoz
Robert Tuliatu	16	IN	16	Maksym Dulia
Nectarios Tsakalos	17	IN	17	Anatolii Hrankovskyi
		Coach		Artur Martyrosian

29 October 2023
16:00 EET (UTC+2:00)

Greece	12–24	Ukraine
Tries: Eskioglou (26'), Tuliatu (52'); Goals: Stratis (2/2)	1st: 6–14; 2nd: 6–10; Report	Tries: Beznoschuk (12), Karpenko (15'), Skorbach (29', 63'), Dulia (73'); Goals: Skorbach (2/5)

Goudi Municipality Stadium, Athens
Referee: Roman Bykhov (Ukraine)

Team details
Greece		Position	Ukraine
Name	Number	Position	Number	Name
Sam Stratis	1	FB	1	Anatoli Hronkovsky
Georgios Arvamdis	2	WG	2	Vasyl Kravchuk
Stefanos Eskioglou	3	CE	3	Mykhailo Troian
Petros Bafaloukas	4	CE	4	Liubomyr Beznoschuk
Alexandros Aliu	5	WG	5	Orest Adamyk
Vasilios Vaiopoulos	6	SO	6	Oleksandr Skorbach
Jordan Meads	7	SH	7	Dmytro Semerenko
Robert Tuliatu	8	PR	8	Valentyn Korchak
Liam Sue-Tin Kentrotis	9	HK	9	Yevhen Checheta
Nectarios Tsakalos	10	PF	10	Volodymyr Karpenko
Nick Uluwatu	11	SR	11	Ihor Yurkin
Nicholas Flocas	12	SR	12	Yevhenii Trusov
Aris Koulizakis	13	LF	13	Oleksandr Scherbina
Bill Tsikrikias	14	IN	14	Ostap Hryshchenko
Myles Gal	15	IN	15	Oleksandr Syvokoz
Stefanos Bastas	16	IN	16	Vadym Milanko
Ioannis Nake	17	IN	17	Maksym Dulia
		Coach		Artur Martyrosian

=== Italy men vs South Africa in Australia ===
28 October 2023
16:00 AEST (UTC+10:00)

Italy	50–20	South Africa
Tries: Lenaz, Sapienza, Piccirilli, Biondi, Pickering, Colovatti, Iaria; Goals: Atkinson (7/9)	1st: 20–6; 2nd: 30–14; Report	Tries: de Vlieg, Canning, Shears; Goals: Cryer (2/6)

Lidcombe Oval, Sydney
Referee: Billy Greatbatch (Australia)

Team details
Italy		Position	South Africa
Name	Number	Position	Number	Name
Daniel Atkinson	1	FB	1	Luke de Vlieg
Jack Piccirilli	2	WG	2	Herchelle Classen
Kyle Pickering	3	CE	3	Gideon Mzembe
Mason Iaria	4	CE	4	Reilly Canning
Damian Nati	5	WG	5	William Shears
Joshua Natoli	6	SO	6	Coby Thomas
Todd Sapienza	7	SH	7	Kam Cryer
Luke Hodge	8	PR	8	Shane Gilham
Joseph Tramantana	9	HK	9	Harry Blake
Anton Iaria	10	PF	10	Joel Tubbs
Alexander Myles	11	SR	11	Brad Sparrow
Rinaldo Palumbo	12	SR	12	Ashley Bull
Nicolas Lenaz	13	LF	13	Aden Perry
Dominic Biondi	14	IN	14	Jason King
Jack Colovatti	15	IN	15	Jason Smith
Matthew Craparotta	16	IN	16	Kalum Gulliver-Brown
Massimo Mari	17	IN	17	Joshua Hill
Leo Epifania		Coach		Darryl Fisher

=== Czech Republic men vs the Netherlands ===
28 October 2023
14:00 CET (UTC+01:00)

Czech Republic	2–36	Netherlands
Goals: Tichý (1/1)	1st: 2–24; 2nd: 0–12; Report	Tries: Donnelly (20'), Harringa (25'), Prins (32'), Turnock (38'), van der Reek (45'), Mulligan (54'); Goals: Mulligan (6/6)

Harta Rugby Club, Vrchlabí
Referee: Jarda Bzoch (Czech Republic)

Team details
Czech Republic		Position	Netherlands
Name	Number	Position	Number	Name
Oldřich Chrbolka	1	FB	1	Harry Mulligan
Dominik Fišer	2	WG	2	Mike Prins
Tomáš Kasik	3	CE	3	Mitch Donnelly
Roman Richtr	4	CE	4	Maas Van Der Reek
Jakub Tichý	5	WG	5	Dimitri Harringa
Daniel Veselý	6	SO	6	Laury Renac
Tomáš Řičica	7	SH	7	Will Johnston
Jan Hovard	8	PR	8	Mauricio Gomez Pazos
Jan Kubat	9	HK	9	James Adams
Jaroslav Novotný	10	PF	10	Bonne Wilce
Tomáš Adamec	11	SR	11	Kees Kuijpers
Ondrej Preninger	12	SR	12	Paul Kuijpers
David Bělohlávek	13	LF	13	Tom Van Bokhoven
Jakub Hudrlík	14	IN	14	Frank Longhurst
Vít Studecký	15	IN	15	Rowan Schuiling
Tomáš Brejtr	16	IN	16	Tom Turnock
Erik Schulz	17	IN	17	Daan van Rossum
Petr Šedina		Coach		Dave Hunter

=== France women vs Wales ===
29 October 2023
15:00 CET (UTC+01:00)

France	14–4	Wales
Tries: Biville, D Samarra, Ramazeilles; Goals: Pommier (1/3)	1st: 10–0; 2nd: 4–4; Report	Tries: Taylor

Stade Albert Domec, Carcassonne
Referee: Jordi Crespo (France)

Team details
France		Position	Wales
Name	Number	Position	Number	Name
Manon Samarra	1	FB	1	Kathryn Salter
Margot Canal	2	WG	2	Eleri Michael
Cristina Song-Puche	3	CE	3	Lowri Nowkett-Morgan
Lauréane Biville	4	CE	4	Ashlea Prescott
Perle Ramazeilles	5	WG	5	Georgia Taylor
Mahault Pommier	6	SO	6	Carys Marsh
Lauriane Canet	7	SH	7	Rhi Parker
Elisa Akpa	8	PR	8	Sara Jones
Dorinne Samarra	9	HK	9	Amy Price
Salomé Segala	10	PF	10	Katie Carr
Inès Legout	11	SR	11	Bethan Dainton
Stacy Bessiere	12	SR	12	Charlie Mundy
Leila Bessahli	13	LF	13	Molly Reardon
Alice Rieunaud	14	IN	14	Shaunni Davies
Sarah Menaa	15	IN	15	Hannah Jones
Elodie Pacull	16	IN	16	Ffion Jenkins
Justine Roses	17	IN	17	Jasmine Gibbons
Noémie Samuel	18	RES	18	Kim Boaler
Romain Maillot		Coach		Tom Brindle

== November ==
=== Nigeria women vs Ghana ===
3 November 2023
15:00 WAT (UTC+01:00)

Nigeria	40–4	Ghana
Tries: Chinaza (2), Chioma, Vera, Rukayat, Success, Lauretta, Blessing; Goals: Augusta (4/8)	1st: 20–0; 2nd: 20–4; Report	Tries: Tettey

Teslim Balogun Stadium, Lagos
Referee: Marshall Nortey (Ghana)

Team details
Nigeria		Position	Ghana
Name	Number	Position	Number	Name
Blessing Aladegelu	1	FB	1	Fati Bhom
Samson Godfirst	2	WG	2	Shamsiya Tahiru
Bayere Lauretta	3	CE	3	Millicent Njomaba
Innocent Adaeze	4	CE	4	Sheila Tettey
Umude Blessing	5	WG	5	Bernice Padiki
Mene Augusta	6	SO	6	Rosemary Sewornu
Nwankpa Chioma	7	SH	7	Belinda Ayele Khakuvie
Dseni Muinat	8	PR	8	Fauzia Nurudeen Larry
Akinade Rukayat	9	HK	9	Eunice Akiuni
Abbah Chinaza	10	PF	10	Jennifer Moncar
Aribidesi Barakat	11	SR	11	Adiza Mohammed
Akhihiero Vera	12	SR	12	Joyce Mamle
Imoisi Abuoybo	13	LF	13	Marceline Ashie
Jimoh Rukayat	14	IN	14	Angela Yakubu Adjuik
Iyoha Success	15	IN	15	Estelle Haizel
Ashagbesori Kafayat	16	IN	16	Mary Obena
Ykuoma Precious	17	IN	17	Eunice Lakioe
		Coach		Riddick Alibah

5 November 2023
15:00 WAT (UTC+01:00)

Nigeria	14–6	Ghana
Tries: Lauretta, Nwanya, Chinaza; Goals: Augusta (1/3)	1st: 10–6; 2nd: 4–0; Report	Tries: Tettey; Goals: Tettey (1/1)

Teslim Balogun Stadium, Lagos
Referee: Marshall Nortey (Ghana)

Team details
Nigeria		Position	Ghana
Name	Number	Position	Number	Name
Blessing Aladegelu	1	FB	1	Belinda Ayele Khakuvie
Perpetua Nwanya	2	WG	2	Eunice Lakioe
Bayere Lauretta	3	CE	3	Shamsiya Tahiru
Ruth Odey	4	CE	4	Millicent Njomaba
Umude Blessing	5	WG	5	Bernice Padiki
Mene Augusta	6	SO	6	Eunice Akiuni
Nwankpa Chioma	7	SH	7	Rosemary Sewornu
Elizabeth Adie	8	PR	8	Fauzia Nurudeen Larry
Akinade Rukayat	9	HK	9	Gracelove Hammond
Abbah Chinaza	10	PF	10	Estelle Haizel
Aribidesi Barakat	11	SR	11	Sheila Tettey
Akhihiero Vera	12	SR	12	Siki Joyce Mamle
Oseni Muinat	13	LF	13	Marceline Ashie
Jimoh Rukayat	14	IN	14	Jennifer Moncar
Stephanie Obi	15	IN	15	Mary Obena
Ashagbesori Kafayat	16	IN	16	Fati Bhom
Iyoha Success	17	IN	17	Jacqueline Anash
		Coach		Riddick Alibah

This was originally scheduled to be a three-game series with the third match on 9 December at University of Ghana Stadium, Accra. However, this was postponed and played in January as a stand alone international.

=== Germany men vs Poland ===
Oder Cup

4 November 2023
16:00 CET (UTC+01:00)

Germany	54–10	Poland
Tries: Nyahoe, Bowie, Wendt, Ngondi (2), Gabedeva (2), Rau, Kikawa; Goals: Billsborough (9/10)	1st: 30–6; 2nd: 24–4; Report	Tries: Romianowsk (2); Goals: Mitek (1/2)

Stadion Buschallee, Berlin
Referee: Misa Vakadranu (Fiji)

Team details
Germany		Position	Poland
Name	Number	Position	Number	Name
Anderson Odur	1	FB	1	Mateusz Kowalewski
Alex Nyahoe	2	WG	2	Adam Jasinski
Brian Kikawa	3	CE	3	Gab Romianowsk
Felix Rau	4	CE	4	Stef Archer
Fabian Wendt	5	WG	5	Mateusz Wojtas
Max Huss	6	SO	6	Łukasz Łucka
Brad Billsborough	7	SH	7	Jakub Mitek
Harry Miles	8	PR	8	Jonathan Tutak
Eoin Bowie	9	HK	9	Tomasz Zerbe
Kote Gabedeva	10	PF	10	Mateusz Dziąg
Max Alderson	11	SR	11	Michał Krzypkowski
Martin Tormann	12	SR	12	Eryk Wisniewskii
Christophe Ngondi	13	LF	13	Maciej Myszkowski
Harry Cartwright	14	IN	14	Simon Adamski
Dany Doukeng	15	IN	15	Karol Myszkowski
Sebastian Paaßen	16	IN	16	Mateusz Rutkiewicz
Jack Baskerville	17	IN

=== Norway men vs Greece ===
4 November 2023
17:00 CET (UTC+01:00)

Norway	6–36	Greece
Tries: Horne; Goals: Mellor-King (1/1)	1st: 0–20; 2nd: 6–16; Report	Tries: Vrahnos, Aliu, Meads, Stratis, Gal, Varypatis, Bosmos; Goals: Stratis (4/7)

Øster Hus Arena, Sandnes
Referee: Michael Smaill (New Zealand)

Team details
Norway		Position	Greece
Name	Number	Position	Number	Name
Frank Kiriinya	1	FB	1	Sam Stratis
Magnus Lima Soiland	2	WG	2	Dimosthenis Kartsonakis
Magnus Odland Sagelv	3	CE	3	Panos Varypatis
Arne Oma Torsen	4	CE	4	Kostas Katsidonis
Martin Høyland	5	WG	5	Alexandros Aliu
Stephen Mwikaria	6	SO	6	Nikolaos Bosmos
Jymaal Mellor-King	7	SH	7	Jordan Meads
Mathias Vada Stenseth-Holm	8	PR	8	Nick Tuliatu
Kristoffer Milligan	9	HK	9	Liam Sue-Tin Kentrotis
Daniel Horne	10	PF	10	Stefanos Bastas
Simon Olsen	11	SR	11	Adam Vrahnos
Nils Kristian Holte	12	SR	12	Nicholas Flocas
Oliver Falk	13	LF	13	Aris Koulizakis
Eric Mellor	14	IN	14	Ioannis Nake
Martin Solberg	15	IN	15	Myles Gal
Robin Bjoernstad	16	IN	16	Aris Dardamanis
Andreas Vågen	17	IN	17	Nectarios Tsakalos
		Coach		Steve Georgallis

=== England women vs Wales ===
4 November 2023
12:00 GMT (UTC±00:00)

England	60–0	Wales
Tries: Hardcastle (2), Hoyle, Beevers, Stanley (2), Owen, Roche, Renouf, Bennett, Rudge; Goals: Stanley (8/11)	1st: 20–0; 2nd: 40–0; Report

Headingley Stadium, Leeds
Referee: Enzo Peyre (France)

Team details
England		Position	Wales
Name	Number	Position	Number	Name
Tara-Jane Stanley	1	FB	1	Leanne Burnell
Eboni Partington	2	WG	2	Eleri Michael
Tamzin Renouf	3	CE	3	Lowri Nowkett-Morgan
Amy Hardcastle	4	CE	4	Kathryn Salter
Caitlin Beevers	5	WG	5	Georgia Taylor
Tara Jones	6	SO	6	Carys Marsh
Georgia Roche	7	SH	7	Rhi Parker
Shona Hoyle	8	PR	8	Sara Jones
Keara Bennett	9	HK	9	Molly Reardon
Olivia Wood	10	PF	10	Katie Carr
Vicky Molyneux	11	SR	11	Hannah Jones
Emily Rudge	12	SR	12	Charlie Mundy
Jodie Cunningham (c)	13	LF	13	Shaunni Davies (c)
Sinead Peach	14	IN	14	Amy Price
Vicky Whitfield	15	IN	15	Brogan Evans
Zoe Hornby	16	IN	16	Ffion Jenkins
Lacey Owen	17	IN	17	Jasmine Gibbons
Anna Davies	18	RES	18	Kim Boaler
Stuart Barrow		Coach		Tom Brindle

=== England wheelchair vs France ===
Fassolette-Kielty Trophy

5 November 2023
15:15 GMT (UTC±00:00)

England	34–43	France
Tries: Hawkins, Coyd, King (2), Collins, Halliwell; Goals: Coyd (1/1), Collins (4/5)	1st: 12–30; 2nd: 22–13; Report	Tries: Bourson (3), Dore, Alazard, Verdi; Goals: Alazard (8/8), Verdi (1/2)

Leeds Arena, Leeds
Attendance: 2,311
Referee: David Butler (England), Matthew Ball (England)

Team details
England		Position	France
Name	Number	Position	Number	Name
Rob Hawkins	2	Starter	1	Lionel Alazard
Joe Coyd	3	Starter	4	Jeremy Bourson
Seb Bachara	4	Starter	5	Adrien Zittel
Lewis King	5	Starter	7	Damien Doré
Tom Halliwell (c)	7	Starter	10	Florian Guttadoro (c)
Nathan Collins	1	Interchange	2	Arno Vargas
Jack Brown	6	Interchange	6	Julien Penella
Josh Butler	8	Interchange	9	Yann Verdi
Rob Boardman		CS		Guillaume Mautz
Tom Coyd		Coach		Sylvain Crismanovich

=== South Africa men vs Kenya ===
JP Botha African Cup

8 November 2023
16:00 SAST (UTC+02:00)

South Africa	56–12	Kenya
Tries: Matsane (2), Coetzee (3), van Deventer, van Heerden, Delport, Campbell, Corneelson; Goals: Mulder (8/10)	Report	Tries: Masete, Mutua; Goals: Ratemo (2/2)

Hannes Fourie Sportgrounds, Pretoria
Referees: AJ Barnard (South Africa), Rudolph du Plooy (South Africa)

Team details
South Africa		Position	Kenya
Name	Number	Position	Number	Name
Junaide Seedat	1	FB	1	Lawrence Okello
Shaun Matsane	2	WG	2	Ramadhan Masete
Marnus Coetzee	3	CE	3	Brian Matua
James Campbell	4	CE	4	Collins Ochieng
Itumeleng Mpete	5	WG	5	Paul Seda
Jean Coetzer	6	SO	6	Dennish Ndinya
Hendrik Mulder	7	SH	7	Lucky Byron
Altus Delport	8	PR	8	Iddo Kuta
Franco Van Deventer	9	HK	9	Victor Ndungu
Cp Louw	10	PF	10	Raymond Ekutu
Dylan Ventner	11	SR	11	James Maranga
Marcelle Corneelsen	12	SR	12	Patrick Mwakina
Allan Kasselman	13	LF	13	Wycliffe Ratemo
Marcelle Viljoen	14	IN	14	Nick Tom Opiyo
Lukhanyiso Fana	15	IN	15	Kevin Sollo
Justin Van Heerden	16	IN	16	Kelly Omari
Tjaart Pretorious	17	IN	17	Steve Muniatu
Fanie Bredenhann		Coach		John Mbai

11 November 2023
18:00 SAST (UTC+02:00)

South Africa	82–2	Kenya
Tries: Coetzee (2), Venter, Bloem (3), Viljoen, Campbell (3), Coetzer, Seedat (2), Mulder; Goals: Mulder (13/15)	Report	Goals: Ratemo (1/1)

Grizzlies Stadium, Pretoria
Referee: Rudolph du Plooy (South Africa)

Team details
South Africa		Position	Kenya
Name	Number	Position	Number	Name
James Cambell	1	FB	1	Lawrence Okello
Junaide Seedat	2	WG	2	Ramadhan Masete
Duane Bloem	3	CE	3	Brain Mutua
Marnus Coetzee	4	CE	4	Collins Ochieng
Shaun Matsane	5	WG	5	Paul Seda
Jean Coetzer	6	SO	6	Denish Ndinya
Henrick Mulder	7	SH	7	Lucky Byron
CP Louw	8	PR	8	Iddo Kuta
Franco van Deventer	9	HK	9	Victor Ndungu
Altus Delport	10	PF	10	Raymond Ekutu
Dylan Venter	11	SR	11	James Maranga
Marcell Viljoen	12	SR	12	Patrick MWakina
Allan Kasselman	13	LF	13	Wycliff Ratemo
Frikkie Jansen	14	IN	14	Nick Tom Opiyo
Odey Roos	15	IN	15	Solo Mbugua Kevin
Marcelle Corneelsen	16	IN	16	Kelly Omari
Luka Fana	17	IN	17	Steven Muniafu
Fanie Bredenhann		Coach		John Mbai

=== Serbia women vs Greece ===
Balkan Cup

11 November 2023
13:00 CET (UTC+01:00)

Serbia	4–8	Greece
Tries: Stoiljković (30')	Report	Tries: Koutsioumpa (61'), Koutsikou (73')

Pusta Reka Stadium, Bojnik
Attendance: ≈500
Referee: Misa Vakadranu (Fiji)

Team details
Serbia		Position	Greece
Name	Number	Position	Number	Name
Tamara Bošnjak	1	FB	1	Charilaos Xygkas
Ljiljana Bajic	2	WG	2	Paula Grosyk
Teodora Micic	3	CE	3	Dimitra Papoutsi
Nika Bajic,	4	CE	4	Isaia Maragkou
Marija Stosic	5	WG	5	Velissaria Koutsioumpa
Katarina Veljanovski	6	SO	6	Magdelini Stavrianou
Jelena Stoiljković	7	SH	7	Asimina Mastoraki
Teodora Marin	8	PR	8	Anna Limperi
Natasa Kovacevic	9	HK	9	Chrysi Lymperidi
Jovana Fridl	10	PF	10	Myrsini Pappa
Sanja Starcevic	11	SR	11	Georgia-Fotini Koutsimpogeorgou
Anna Liuter	12	SR	12	Christina Makri
Marija Maslakovic	13	LF	13	Ourania Koutsikou
Dragana Žeželj	14	IN	14	Giota Alevra
Natalija Simic	15	IN	15	Katerina Varypati
Marija Simovic	16	IN	16	Maria-Anna Lamprou
Sofija Kovacevic	17	IN	17	Eleftheria Angeli
Slobodan Manak		Coach		Stuart McLennan

=== France wheelchair vs England ===
Fassolette-Kielty Trophy

25 November 2023
15:00 CET (UTC+01:00)

France	18–34	England
Tries: Zittel, Abassi, Guttadoro, Bourson; Goals: Guttadoro (1/2)	Report	Tries: King, Hawkins, Collins (2), Brown; Goals: Hawkins (4/5), Collins (3/3)

Palais des Sports de Marseille, Marseille
Referee: Ollie Cruickshank (Scotland), Djamel Merzouk (France)

Team details
France		Position	England
Name	Number	Position	Number	Name
Lionel Alazard	1	Starter	8	Josh Butler
Jeremy Bourson	4	Starter	7	Tom Halliwell
Adrien Zittel	5	Starter	2	Rob Hawkins
Yann Verdi	9	Starter	5	Lewis King
Florian Guttadoro	10	Starter	10	Wayne Boardman
Nicolas Lemaitre	12	Interchange	1	Nathan Collins
Damien Dore	7	Interchange	3	Joe Coyd
Mostefa Abassi	3	Interchange	6	Jack Brown
Sylvain Crismanovich		Coach		Tom Coyd

== December ==
=== Kenya men vs France ===
2 December 2023
15:00 EAT (UTC+03:00)

Kenya	6–78	France
Tries: Odhiambo; Goals: Abdalla (1/1)	1st: 0–42; 2nd: 6–36; Report	Tries: Hnaloan (3), Pourchi (3), Pons (3), Crunel (3), Grosson, Boyer, Le Cam; Goals: Fabre (9/15)

ASK Showgrounds, Nairobi
Referee: Stephane Vincent (France)

Team details
Kenya		Position	France
Name	Number	Position	Number	Name
Anderson Odur	1	FB	1	Quentin Crunel
Ramadhan Masete	2	WG	2	Baptiste Pourchi
Wycliff Ratemo	3	CE	3	Alan Baby
Denish Ndyina	4	CE	4	Maxime Grosson
Edwin Watulo	5	WG	5	Matthew Pons
Joseph Nun	6	SO	6	Baptiste Fabre
Saidi Abdalla	7	SH	7	Clement Herrero
Sollo Mbugua	8	PR	8	Baptiste Scimone
Kelly Omari	9	HK	9	Yacine Ben Abdesesian
Malcom Busuru	10	PF	10	Clement Boyer
Paul Seda	11	SR	11	Hnagan Hnaloan
Evans Omondi	12	SR	12	Corentin Le Cam
Raymond Ekutu	13	LF	13	Guilerno Aispuro Bichett
ichael Karani	14	IN	14	Mathias Leveille
Victor Ndungu	15	IN	15	Paolo Dall Asta
James Odhiambo	16	IN	16	Felix Aubry
		IN	17	Nolan Lopez-Buttignol
Edward Rombo		Coach		Maxime Grésèque

5 December 2023
16:00 EAT (UTC+03:00)

Kenya	4–108	France
Tries: Ratemo	1st: 4–56; 2nd: 0–52; Report	Tries: Crunel (3), Pedrero (2), Le Cam (3), Herrero (2), Bichett, Baby (4), Asta (2), Abdesesian, Fabre; Goals: Fabre (4/4), Herrero (12/15)

ASK Showgrounds, Nairobi
Referee: Stephane Vincent (France)

Team details
Kenya		Position	France
Name	Number	Position	Number	Name
Anderson Odur	1	FB	1	Quentin Crunel
Ramadhan Masete	2	WG	2	Nittim Pedrero
Wycliff Ratemo	3	CE	3	Maxime Grosson
Frank Awuor,	4	CE	4	Alan Baby
Michael Karani	5	WG	5	Matthew Pons
James Odhiambo	6	SO	6	Baptiste Fabre
Saidi Abdalla	7	SH	7	Clement Herrero
Sollo Mbugua	8	PR	8	Bastien Scimone
Victor Ndungu	9	HK	9	Yacine Ben Abdesesian
Malcom Busuru	10	PF	10	Clement Boyer
Kelly Omari	11	SR	11	Corentin Le Cam
Evans Omondi	12	SR	12	Hnagan Hnaloan
Raymond Ekutu	13	LF	13	Guilerno Aispuro Bichett
Edwin Watulo	14	IN	14	Mathias Marty
Joseph Otieno	15	IN	15	Paolo Dall Asta
Paul Seda	16	IN	16	Wail Skoundri
Joseph Nun	17	IN	17	Nolan Lopez-Buttignol
Edward Rombo		Coach		Maxime Grésèque

=== Argentina men vs Brazil ===
Copa Mercosur

2 December 2023
15:30 ART (UTC-03:00)

Argentina	44–26	Brazil

Club Atlético San Isidro, Buenos Aires

Team details
Argentina		Position	Brazil
Name	Number	Position	Number	Name
Marcelo Vilalba	1	FB	1	Emerson Bertagnoli
Luca Contini	2	WG	2	Felipe Nogueira
Juan Pablo Lopez	3	CE	3	Ricardo Bodra
Rodrigo Molina	4	CE	4	Wagner Adao
Jeremias Pontoriero	5	WG	5	Brendon Simon
Gustavo Cosso	6	SO	6	Alcino Amato
Tiago Castro	7	SH	7	Zachary Grundy
Gaston Barrera	8	PR	8	Caio Ozzioli
Gabriel Stasiewicz	9	HK	9	Liam Piacente
Ullses Silva	10	PF	10	Bruno Gil
German Barragan	11	SR	11	Gabriel Saraiva
Lucas Escobar	12	SR	12	Leandro Caetano
Maximillano Abrego	13	LF	13	Nicholas Sydorowitz
Santiago Villar	14	IN	14	Heron Godoi
Lautaro Cabrera	15	IN	15	Felipe Dittz
Santiago Kolarik	16	IN	16	Vinicius Candido
Brian Cofre	17	IN	17	Thiago Rocha
Pablo Aguilera		Coach		Daniel Chiovetti

=== Jamaica men vs the United States ===
2 December 2023
15:00 EST (UTC-05:00)

Jamaica	26–30	United States
Tries: Williams, Graham, Lynch (2), Walker; Goals: Grant (1/2), Bailey (1/2), Hall (1/1)	Report	Tries: Webb, Kyle Granby (3), Eichner, Bannerot; Goals: McCrory (1/4), Granby (2/2)

University of West Indies, Kingston
Referee: Kemoy Whyte (Jamaica)

Team details
Jamaica		Position	USA
Name	Number	Position	Number	Name
Andrew Simpson	1	FB	1	David Washington
Kamarine Williams	2	WG	2	James Williams
Ryan Grant	3	CE	3	Jason Martin
Tahj-Jay Lynch	4	CE	4	Kyle Granby
Kenneth Walker	5	WG	5	Urban Iyo
Chevaughn Bailey	6	SO	6	Ryan Bannerot
Marvin Thompson	7	SH	7	Peter Lupton
Owen Linton	8	PR	8	Tevita Bryce
Adrian Hall	9	HK	9	Mason McCrory
Omar Jones	10	PF	10	Malcolm Webb
Kevin Thomas	11	SR	11	Wes Piggins
Reinhardo Richards	12	SR	12	Sean Hunt
Daniel Graham	13	LF	13	Joe Eichner
Akeem Murray	14	IN	14	Matt Finnesy
Kile Nembhard	15	IN	15	Ethan Ferrick
Hakeem Richards	16	IN	16	Gunnar Johnson
Oshane Edie	17	IN	17	Bart Longchamp
Roy Calvert		Coach		Sean Rutgerson

=== Greece women vs the Netherlands ===
9 December 2023
14:00 EET (UTC+2:00)

Greece	0–14	Netherlands
	Report	Tries: Kennedy, Berding, Van Beukering; Goals: Nikkels (1/3)

Municipal Stadium Dimitris Nikolaidis, Athens
Referee: Misa Vakadranu (Fiji)

Team details
Greece		Position	Netherlands
Name	Number	Position	Number	Name
Sophia Anagnostopoulou	1	FB	1	Nicole Kennedy
Dimitra Papoutsi	2	WG	2	Danique Nikkels
Rosemary Van De Goor	3	CE	3	Lisa Berding
Isaia Maragkou	4	CE	4	Anniek Nauta
Velissaria Koutsioumpa	5	WG	5	Hannah Van Beukering
Christina Makri	6	SO	6	Hiske Blom
Magdelini Stavrianou	7	SH	7	Rixt Aerts
Sophia Margarita Kitsaneli	8	PR	8	Sele Steenkist
Asimina Mastoraki	9	HK	9	Ver Van Der Zwan
Maria-Anna Lamprou	10	PF	10	Lorraine Voorbach
Georgia-Fotini Koutsimpogeorgou	11	SR	11	Clara Terlouw
Katerina Varypati	12	SR	12	Sylvie Moelee
Styliani Markou	13	LF	13	Linneke Gevers
Giota Alevra	14	IN	14	Stephanie Van Diepen
Anna Limperi	15	IN	15	Lotte Westerlaken
Vasiliki Roumpi	16	IN	16	Kyra Elzinga
Eleftheria Angeli	17	IN	17	Dominique Velema
Stuart McLennan		Coach		Matt Rigby

=== Kenya women vs Uganda ===
16 December 2023
14:00 EAT (UTC+03:00)

Kenya	54–0	Uganda
Tries: Mijere (2'), Abuga (5'), Nabwire (8'), Anyango (10'), Salamba (22'), Oketch (37'), Chitechi (42'), Muigai (58'), Oketch (60'), Abuga (80'); Goals: Chitechi (7/11)	1st: 32–0; 2nd: 22–0; Report

Kisumu Polytechnic, Kisumu
Referee: Brian Odiwuory (Kenya)

Team details
Kenya		Position	Uganda
Name	Number	Position	Number	Name
Christine Oketch	1	FB	1	Nema Sarah Alanyo
Maxine Abuga	2	WG	2	Bonet Irankunda
Alice Muigai	3	CE	3	Isabella Ira
Angel Salamba	4	CE	4	Fazirah Namukwaya
Mary Ngendo	5	WG	5	Sarah Namutebi
Moreen Awuor	6	SO	6	Aisha Nakityo Nabulime
Lovinah Mijere (c)	7	SH	7	Maimuna Namboga
Janet Malwa	8	PR	8	Susan Agenorwot
Milkah Chitechi	9	HK	9	Lucky Melan Nirere (c)
Dorris Kimani	10	PF	10	Rachel Cyizanye
Sophye Nabwire	11	SR	11	Salama Uwamahoro
Clarice Mutambi	12	SR	12	Sarah Kirabo
Dorothy Mulela	13	LF	13	Judith Ntakirutimana
Vivian Anyango	14	IN	14	Emily Muhoza
Lawnisky Munayi	15	IN	15	Halima Kemigisha
Esther Ongiri	16	IN	16	Fortunate Irankunda
Rose Nyaboke	17	IN	17	Cabrine Kirabo
Antonio Lombardo		Coach

Originally planned as a three match series with the first game in Kenya and the other two in Uganda, the two matches in Uganda on 20 and 23 December were cancelled earlier in December, as was a men's match on 16 December between the two countries which would have been a double header with the women's game.
