= Jamaica Rugby League Association =

Sports governing body in Jamaica

- Founded: 1 July 2004
- IRL affiliation: 22 October 2013 (full)
- Americas affiliation: ???? (observer); October 2010 (affiliate); 22 February 2013 (full)
- Responsibility: Jamaica
- Coach: Dean Thomas
- Competitions: Jamaica National League
- Website: jamaicarugbyleague.com

(Jamaica)

The Jamaica Rugby League Association is the governing body for the sport of rugby league football in Jamaica. The Association was formed in 2004.

== See also ==
- Rugby league in Jamaica
- Jamaica national rugby league team
- Jamaica women's national rugby league team
