= Philippines national rugby team =

The Philippines national rugby team may refer to one of the Philippines' national team in rugby sports:

Men

- Philippines national rugby union team (fifteens XV labing lima)
- Philippines national rugby union team (sevens)
- Philippines national rugby league team (league thirteens XIII labing tatlo)

Women

- Philippines women's national rugby league team (league thirteens XIII labing tatlo)
- Philippines women's national rugby union team (fifteens XV labing lima)
- Philippines women's national rugby union team (sevens)
