= Central Luzon Crusaders =

Club information
- Founded: 2013

Current details
- Competition: Philippines National Rugby League Championship

The Central Luzon Crusaders is a Philippine rugby league team based in Indang, Cavite. They play in the Philippines National Rugby League Championship.

== History ==
The Central Luzon Crusaders was established in 2013 as the Indang Rebels. The rugby league team was established by expatriate students from Papua New Guinea attending higher education institutions in the Philippines. For three years the Rebels competed at the annual Papua New Guinea Independence day competition at the Adventist University of the Philippines.

In late 2015, Marc Leabres contacted, four out of the six teams, the Indang Rebels, PerSouth Brothers, Recto Royals, and the United Vikings which were participating at the PNG Independence day tournaments looking for a team to sponsor to be part of the Philippines National Rugby League Championship. Leabres is a Filipino-Australian who works as a "performance analyst" with the Cronulla Sharks of the NRL looking to develop rugby league in the Philippines. Only the Indang Rebels responded to Leabres' offer

The name of the team was changed to "Central Luzon Crusaders" by Leabres as a homage to his family's home region of Central Luzon and the Clark City Crusaders, a Filipino-Australian team he played for at the Zambalez 9's which was organized by the Philippines National Rugby League. Asa Gorden one of the founding Papuan New Guinean students remarked that the "Rebels" name had "nothing special" and was satisfied of the prospect of joining the national rugby league and promoting the sport in the country.

The team will participate at the finals of the 2016 Philippines National Rugby League Championship.
