= Rugby league in Jamaica =

- Country: Jamaica
- Governing body: Jamaica Rugby League Association
- National team: Jamaica
- Registered players: 500+

National competitions
- Jamaica National League

== Domestic competition ==
The Jamaica Rugby League National Club Championship was formed in 2005 and initially consisted of four teams. Throughout the years the numbers have grown. In 2013, there were 20 senior teams featuring in Community, Collegiate and Parish Championships. There are also several High and Primary school programs running throughout Jamaica.

In early 2011, Hurricanes Rugby League was launched with the intention of developing juniors to play at a professional/semi-professional level. Rugby league in Jamaica is growing with universities and high schools taking up the sport.

== Governing body ==
The Jamaica Rugby League Association is the governing body of Jamaican rugby league, they work with the Rugby League European Federation and the Rugby League International Federation and other rugby league governing bodies across The Americas region.

== National teams ==
=== Men's team ===
The men's national team is known as the Reggae Warriors. They play regular internationals against Canada and the USA. The team is made up of both local and English based players. They are presently coached by Romeo Monteith.

Their first international was a 37–22 loss to the United States in November 2009. In 2011, Jamaica took part in qualification for the 2013 World Cup, and in 2015 competed in qualification for the 2017 World Cup, but were unsuccessful on both occasions.

In 2018, Jamaica qualified for the 2021 World Cup by winning the 2018 Americas Rugby League Championship. In October 2022, they made their World Cup début in a 48–2 loss to Ireland.

=== Women's team ===
The women' national team initially played in rugby league nines tournaments, taking part in the Americas 9s in 2019, and then winning the Naples 9s in 2023. In September 2023, they played their first full international, losing 80–8 to the United States.

== See also ==
- Jamaica National League
- Sport in Jamaica
