= PNRL Shield =

- Sport: Rugby league
- Formerly known as: PNRL Estepa Elefante Cup
- Instituted: 2016
- Inaugural season: 2016
- Number of teams: 5
- Country: Philippines
- Holders: Manila Storm (2024)
- Most titles: Manila Storm (3 titles)

The Philippine National Rugby League Champions Shield, also known as the PNRL Shield, is the top level domestic rugby league competition in the Philippines. It is organized by the Pambansang Ragbi Liga Ng Pilipinas (PNRL).

== History ==
The Philippines National Rugby League (PNRL) an organization for rugby league was established in 2011. The group initially started organizing 9-a-side tournaments in the Philippines.

The full 13-a-side competition was then organized in 2016.

The PNLR under its affiliate Philippine Tamaraw Rugby League, Inc. launched a domestic league in the Philippines. The inaugural tournament was named as the Erick Paul Estepa Elefante Cup and was held at the Bicol University, Albay Sports Complex in October 15–16, 2016.

The tournament was not held from 2020 to 2022 due to the COVID-19 pandemic.

The tournament known as the PNRL Estepa Elefante Cup later became known as the PNRL Shield.

== Champions ==
Year	Champions	No. of teams
2016	Manila Storm	4
2017	— (Note: The 2017 season had four registered teams. However the PNRL website lists the winners as "TBA" for 2017. There is no explicit source stating if the season was held and later cancelled or was never held to begin with. The 2019 season was described as the "3rd season")	4
2018	North Luzon Hunters	4
2019	North Luzon Hunters	~~4~~ (Note: The Clark Jets withrew after round 1) 3
2020	Cancelled due to the COVID-19 pandemic	
2021	Cancelled due to the COVID-19 pandemic	
2022	Postponed to 2023	
2023	Manila Storm	4
2024	Manila Storm	4
2025	To be determined	5

== Teams ==
2025 teams

- Gorillas Rugby, established 2023 in Makati.
- Pacific Kumuls (debutants)
- Pampanga Panthers, established 2023.
- Manila Storm
- Braves RFC

Previous teams

- Albay Vulcans (2016), founded by Ric Raymond Bellen. Based in Bicol University
- Batangas Eels (2017)
- Caloocan Bulldogs (2023)
- Cavite Tigers (2018-2019, 2023)
- Clark Brothers (2018)
- Clark Jets (2019)
- Central Luzon Crusaders (2016)
- University of Batangas Toro (2016)
- North Luzon Hunters (2017–2019 (Note: Entered as Hunter A and Hunter B in 2017), 2023)

== See also ==
- Philippines national rugby league team
