= Spanish Rugby League Association =

Governing body of rugby league in Spain

- Asociación Española de Rugby League
- Founded: 2013
- RLEF affiliation: Observer: 2013–2015; Affiliate: 2015–
- Responsibility: Spain
- Headquarters: Valencia
- Key people: Salomé Sansona (President)
- Website: www.rugbyleague.es/

(Spain)
- As of 29 August 2018

The Spanish Rugby League Association (Spanish: Asociación Española de Rugby League, AERL) also known as España Rugby League, is the governing body of rugby league in Spain. The body was officially founded in 2013 and has held affiliate-level membership of the Rugby League European Federation since 2015, making the national team eligible to qualify for the Rugby League World Cup.

== History ==
Rugby league in Spain under Spanish governance began in 2013. The governing body was formed on 28 August 2013 and awarded observer status of the RLEF on 27 December 2013; the announcement coming on 13 January 2014. Affiliate membership was achieved in early 2015.

== National team ==
The national team played its first match on 25 May 2014, defeating Belgium in Brussels. The first captain was Aitor Davila and the first Spanish try at international level was scored by Gonzalo Morro.

=== 2017 World Cup qualifying ===
Spain took part in the very first match of the qualification process for the 2017 Rugby League World Cup, when they travelled to Riga to face Latvia. The Spanish side won the match 32-12 and progressed to the European C competition, which is the next phase of qualification.
