= Pio Seci =

Fiji international rugby league footballer (born 1993)

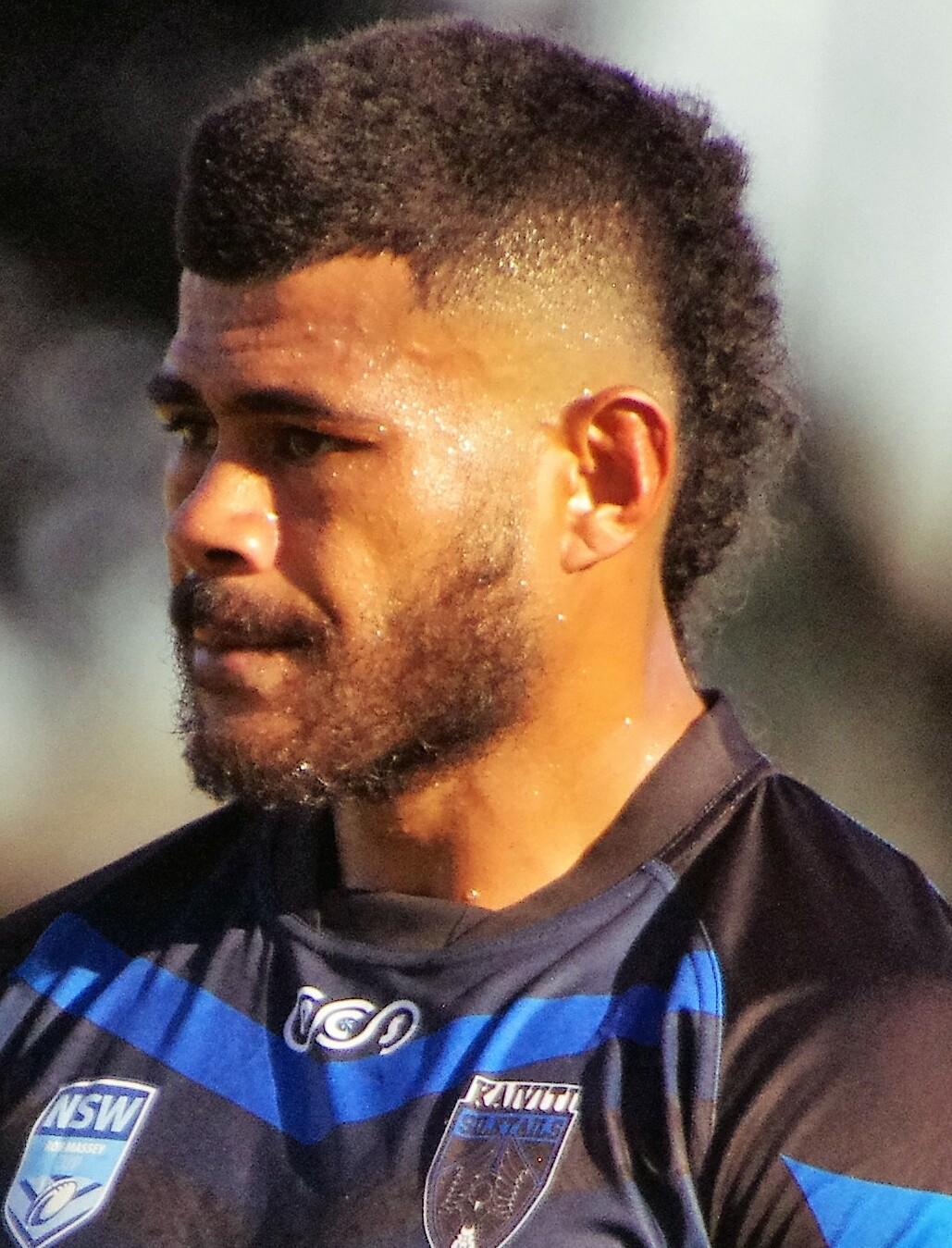

Personal information
- Full name: Pio Maisamoa Seci
- Born: 19 August 1993 (age 32) Suva, Fiji
- Height: 185 cm (6 ft 1 in)
- Weight: 106 kg (16 st 10 lb)

Playing information
- Position: Wing, Centre
Club
Years	Team	Pld	T	G	FG	P
2022	Manly Sea Eagles	1	0	0	0	0
2023–	SO Avignon	13	11	0	0	44
	Total	14	11	0	0	44
Representative
Years	Team	Pld	T	G	FG	P
2016–22	Fiji	5	0	0	0	0
2019	Fiji Prime Minister's XIII	1	0	0	0	0
- Source: As of 9 November 2022
- Relatives: Tui Kamikamica (cousin)

Pio Maisamoa Seci (/pɪoʊ sɛθi/) (born 19 August 1993) is a Fijian professional rugby league footballer who plays as a winger and centre for Fiji at international level.

He previously played for the Manly Warringah Sea Eagles in the National Rugby League

== Background ==
Born in Suva, Fiji, Seci grew up in the nearby suburb of Nabua. He played rugby league for the Nabua Broncos from the age of 12. He attended St Agnes Primary School and Queen Victoria School, before earning a scholarship to Good Counsel College in Innsifail.

== Playing career ==
In 2011, Seci played for the Northern Pride in the Mal Meninga Cup, scoring 2 tries. In 2012, he signed with the Canterbury-Bankstown Bulldogs, joining their NYC side. That year, he played for Bankstown Sports in the local Canterbury under-19 competition, scoring seven tries in five games. In 2013, he made his debut for the Canterbury NYC side, playing two games and scoring one try.

In 2014, Seci joined the Easts Tigers' FOGS Cup side. After one season with the Tigers, he returned to Fiji in 2015 to play for his old club, the Nabua Broncos in the Fiji National Rugby League Competition. On 8 October 2016, Seci made his international debut for Fiji, coming off the interchange in their 20-18 victory over Samoa in Apia. In October 2017, he was named in Fiji's 2017 Rugby League World Cup squad. Seci signed with the Ipswich Jets in the Queensland Cup starting in 2018. In the absence of Penioni Tagituimua, Seci was named captain of the Kaiviti Silktails for their round 11 match against the Hills District Bulls. In round 20 of the 2022 NRL season, Seci made his first grade debut for Manly in their defeat against the Sydney Roosters.

== Personal life ==
Seci is a first cousin of fellow Fijian representative Tui Kamikamica.
