= IRL World Rankings =

IRL World Rankings may refer to:

- IRL Men's World Rankings
- IRL Women's World Rankings
- IRL Wheelchair World Rankings
