= Pambansang Ragbi Liga Ng Pilipinas =

Rugby league in the Philippines

- Founded: 2011 (Note: As the Philippines National Rugby League – Australia Inc. in New South Wales. Incorporated in the Philippines in 2020.)
- Formerly named: Philippines National Rugby League
- IRL affiliation: Observer: 2021–
- Responsibility: Philippines
- Key people: Reynaldo Nery (President)
- Website: pnrl.org

(Philippines)
- As of August 19, 2025

The Pambansang Ragbi Liga Ng Pilipinas (lit. 'Philippines National Rugby League'; abbreviated as PNRL) is the national sports association for rugby league in the Philippines.

== History ==
The Pambansang Ragbi Liga ng Pilipinas (PNRL) was established in 2011 in New South Wales, Australia as the Philippines National Rugby League – Australia Inc. The PNRL sent representation at the 2012 Cabramatta International Nines. It also hosted the Rugby League Asian Cup in the same year where the Philippines won over Thailand. It was the first ever official rugby league match in Asia.

In 2016, they began organizing a domestic full-side rugby league competition in the Philippines starting with four teams called the PNRL Shield.

In October 2020, the PNRL was incorporated as the Pambansang Ragbi Liga ng Pilipinas in the Philippines. The Australian counterpart was voluntarily cancelled in April 2021.

The PNRL became a member of International Rugby League in February 5, 2021. This was followed by the Philippine Olympic Committee recognition of the PNRL as the national sports association for rugby league in the Philippines on May 30, 2022

== National teams ==
- Philippines national rugby league team
- Philippines women's national rugby league team
- Developmental team
- Under-18 youth team

== Competitions ==
- PNRL Shield
- PNRL Rugby League 9s

== See also ==
- Philippine Rugby Football Union
