= Bastien Scimone =

France international rugby league footballer

Personal information
- Full name: Bastien Scimone
- Born: 2 November 1998 (age 27) Pyrénées-Orientales, Occitania, France
- Height: 6 ft 0 in (1.84 m)
- Weight: 15 st 6 lb (98 kg)

Playing information
- Position: Prop
Club
Years	Team	Pld	T	G	FG	P
2018–22	Saint-Estève XIII Catalan	39	5	0	0	20
2022–23	Catalans Dragons	3	0	0	0	0
2023(loan)	→Toulouse Olympique	3	0	0	0	0
2023–24	Saint-Estève XIII Catalan	16	4	0	0	16
2024–25	AS Carcassonne	18	1	0	0	4
2025–	Pia XIII Baroudeur	0	0	0	0	0
	Total	79	10	0	0	40
Representative
Years	Team	Pld	T	G	FG	P
2023–	France	1	0	0	0	0
- Source: As of 16 October 2026

Bastien Scimone (born 2 November 1998) is a French professional rugby league footballer who plays as a prop for Pia XIII Baroudeur in the Super XIII.

In 2022, he made his debut in the Super League for the Catalans Dragons against Wigan Warriors.

== International ==
He made his début on 29 April 2023 in the 64-0 defeat to England at the Halliwell Jones Stadium.
