= Tui Kamikamica =

Fiji international rugby league footballer

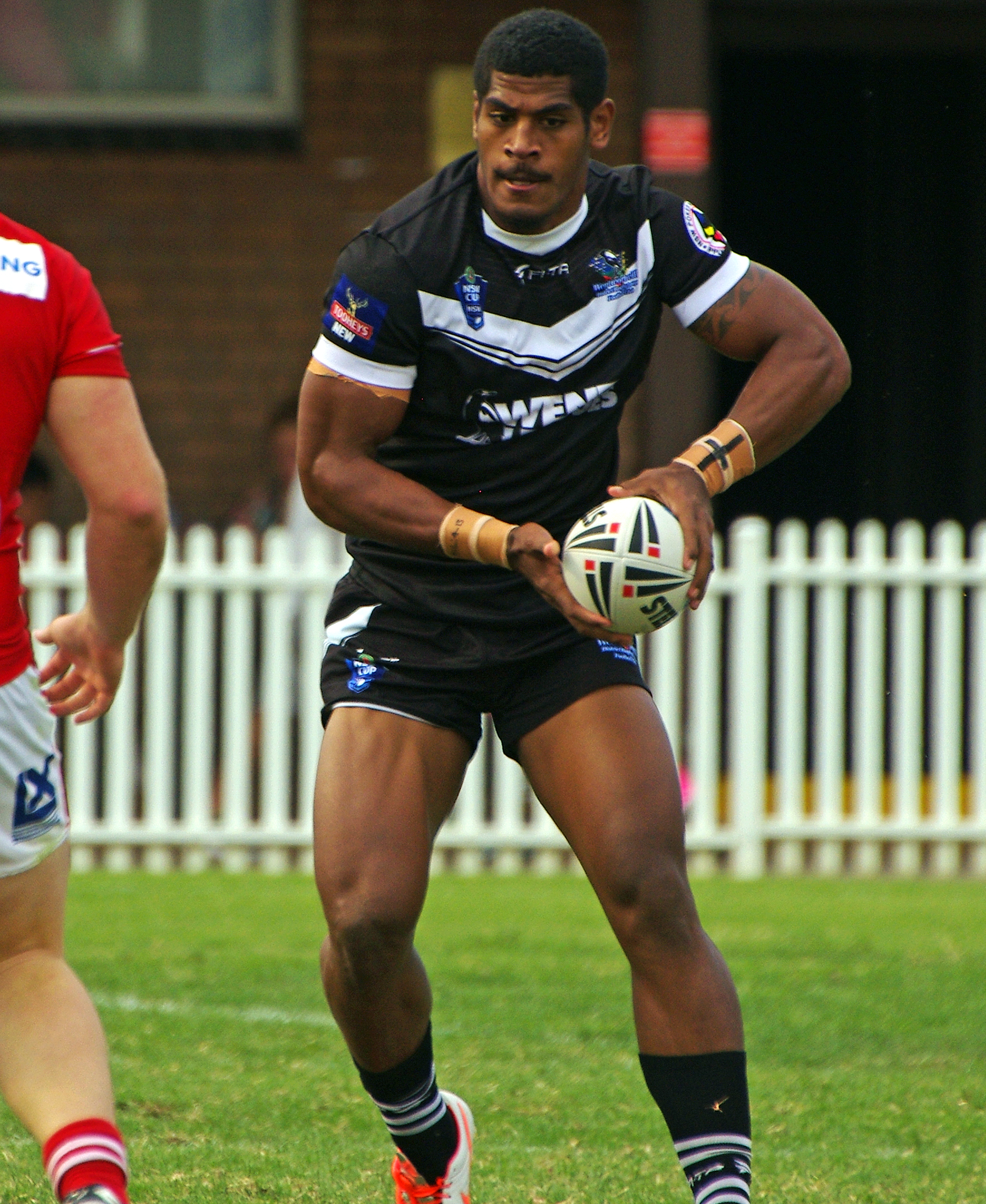

Personal information
- Full name: Erevonu Tuicaumatalevu Kamikamica
- Born: 18 May 1994 (age 32) Somosomo, Fiji
- Height: 195 cm (6 ft 5 in)
- Weight: 110 kg (17 st 5 lb)

Playing information
- Position: Prop, Lock
Club
Years	Team	Pld	T	G	FG	P
2017–26	Melbourne Storm	142	11	0	0	44
Representative
Years	Team	Pld	T	G	FG	P
2016–26	Fiji	22	3	0	0	12
- Source: As of 28 March 2026
- Relatives: Pio Seci (cousin)

Erevonu Tuicaumatalevu "Tui" Kamikamica (born 18 May 1994) is a retired Fijian professional rugby league footballer.

== Early life ==
Kamikamica was born in Taveuni, Fiji. He was raised in the village of Somosomo on the Fijian island of Taveuni, and played rugby union and was educated at Queen Victoria School, Nasinu in his youth.

He was scouted by the Parramatta Eels while playing for the Fijian Schoolboys rugby union team in late 2012.

== Playing career ==
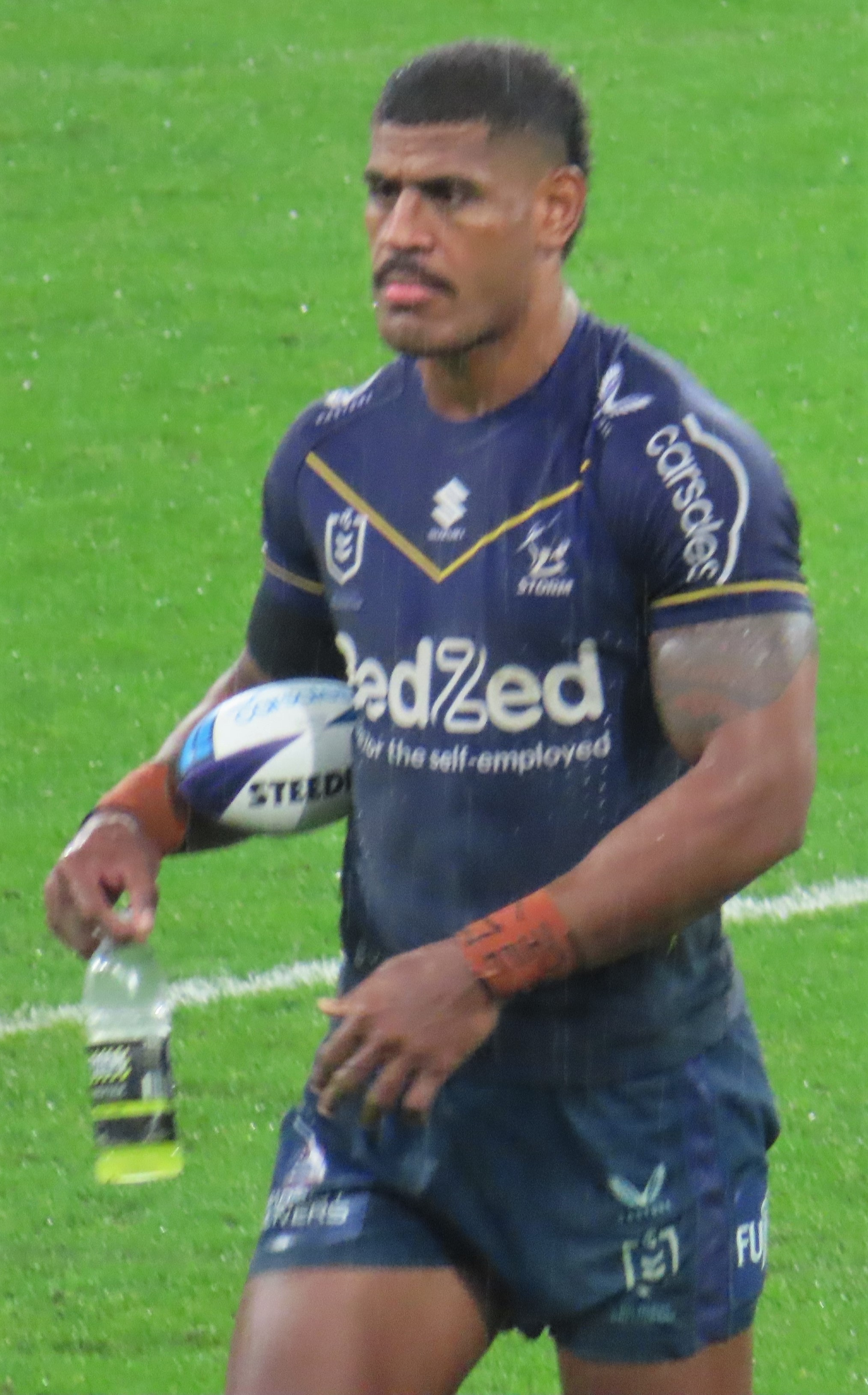
Kamikamica in 2023

Kamikamica moved to Australia to play rugby league for the Eels' NYC team in 2013 and 2014. In 2015, he played for the Wentworthville Magpies, a feeder team to the Eels, in the New South Wales Cup before signing to play rugby union with the Canberra Vikings in the National Rugby Championship later that year.

=== 2016 ===
In 2016, Kamikamica returned to rugby league with the Sunshine Coast Falcons, a feeder team to the Melbourne Storm, in the Queensland Cup. He made his international debut for Fiji in their match against Papua New Guinea on 7 May. On 27 May, Kamikamica earned a full-time contract with the Storm, lasting until the end of 2018. He spent the remainder of the year playing for the Falcons, and was selected to represent Fiji in their match against Samoa on 8 October.

=== 2017 ===
In 2017, Kamikamica made his NRL debut for the Melbourne Storm in their round 5 match against the Penrith. On 6 May, he represented Fiji in their match against Tonga. Kamikamica played two games for Melbourne throughout the season, and didn't play in the 2017 NRL Grand Final, which Melbourne won, spending much of the year with the Sunshine Coast Falcons. On 7 October, Kamikamica was named in Fiji's 24-man squad for the 2017 Rugby League World Cup.

=== 2018 ===
Kamikamica managed only five appearances for Melbourne in the 2018 NRL season. He did not feature in the club's finals series or the 2018 NRL Grand Final where the club lost 21–6 against the Sydney Roosters.

=== 2019 ===
He played 21 games for Melbourne in the 2019 NRL season as the club finished as runaway Minor Premiers and were favourites to take out the premiership. He played in the club's preliminary final loss against the Sydney Roosters.

=== 2020 ===
Kamikamica only made five appearances for Melbourne in the 2020 NRL season. He did not feature in the club's finals campaign or their 2020 NRL Grand Final victory over Penrith.

=== 2021 ===
He played a total of 22 games for Melbourne in the 2021 NRL season as they claimed the Minor Premiership. He played in both finals matches including the preliminary final where Melbourne suffered a shock 10–6 loss against eventual premiers Penrith.

=== 2022 ===
Kamikamica played for Fiji in the 2022 Pacific Test against PNG at Campbelltown Stadium, his first international appearance since 2019. Kamikamica played 16 games for Melbourne in the 2022 NRL season including the clubs elimination finals loss against Canberra.

=== 2023 ===
Kamikamica played 21 games for Melbourne in the 2023 NRL season as the club finished third on the table. Kamikamica played in Melbourne's preliminary final loss against Penrith.

=== 2024 ===
He played a total of 22 matches for Melbourne in the 2024 NRL season as the club were runaway minor premiers. Kamikamica played in Melbourne's 2024 NRL Grand Final loss against Penrith.

=== 2025 ===
He played 24 games for Melbourne in the 2025 NRL season including their 26-22 2025 NRL Grand Final loss against Brisbane. In the second half of the match, Kamikamica dropped the ball over the try line with Melbourne leading the match 22–12. This proved to be a decisive moment in the match as Brisbane scored 14 unanswered points after this to win their 7th premiership.

=== 2026 ===
On 30 January 2026, the Storm announced that Kamikamica signed on for the 2026 season. On 30 March 2026, Kamikamica was ruled out for an indefinite period after suffering a suspected stroke. On 2 April 2026,the Storm announced that Kamikamica had been released from the hospital and would undergo a period of rehabilitation. On 15 April it was reported that Kamikamica had returned to Storm training after being released from hospital. On 29 April, Kamikamica gave an update on his condition saying he required a second surgery to fix a hole in his heart that caused the blood clot and stroke. On 18 August, the Storm announced that Kamikamica was inducted as a life member of the Storm. On 20 August, Kamikamica announced his retirement from the NRL on medical grounds. In November, the Storm announced that Kamikamica would coach the Storm's pathway squad.

== Statistics ==
Year	Team	Game	Tries	Pts
2017	Melbourne Storm	2		
2018	Melbourne Storm	5		
2019	Melbourne Storm	21	2	8
2020	Melbourne Storm	5	1	4
2021	Melbourne Storm	22	3	12
2022	Melbourne Storm	16	2	8
2023	Melbourne Storm	21	1	4
2024	Melbourne Storm	22	1	4
2025	Melbourne Storm	24	1	4
2026	Melbourne Storm	4		
	Totals	142	11	44

== Personal life ==
Kamikamica is a first cousin of fellow Fijian representative Pio Seci.

On 25 November 2021, Kamikamica was stood down by the Melbourne club after being charged with assaulting a woman in Brisbane's Fortitude Valley. He was ordered to appear in court on 10 January 2022. On 27 April 2022, the charges against Kamikamica were dropped and he was cleared to continue playing under the NRL's no fault stand-down policy.

On 30 March 2026, Melbourne Storm announced Kamikamica had been hospitalized following a suspected stroke.

On 20 August 2026, it was announced that Kamikamica had retired from rugby league on medical grounds.
