= Philippines women's national rugby league team =

Philippines
Team information
- Nickname: Sampaguitas
- Governing body: Pambansang Ragbi Liga Ng Pilipinas
- Region: Asia–Pacific
- Head coach: Tammy Fletcher
- Captain: Tammy Fletcher
- IRL ranking: 24 ▼2 (August 20, 2026)

Team results
- First international
- Philippines 0–6 Malta (Sydney, Australia; October 23, 2022)
- Biggest win
- Philippines 42–0 Malta (Sydney, Australia; October 28, 2023)
- Biggest defeat
- Philippines 0–6 Malta (Sydney, Australia; October 23, 2022)

The Philippines women's national rugby league team (nicknamed Sampaguitas) represents the Philippines in women's rugby league. Representing the Philippines in international rugby league competition.

== History ==
The team's first international competition held on October 23, 2022 ended in a 6-0 loss to Malta. Their next game was on January 28, 2023 against Greece which they won 38–0.

== Current squad ==
Squad vs Malta (October 2022);

1. Leticia Haas-Quinlan
2. Stefanie Thomas
3. Pia Galon
4. Lila Reynolds
5. Tynia Wells
6. Natalia Webb
7. Renee Targett
8. Michelle Koch
9. Tammy Fletcher (C)
10. Erica Rowell
11. Jacky Mae-Lyden
12. Cassandra Koch
13. Janine Jamieson
14. Linae Williams
15. Meagan Rickertt
16. Faith Mella-Reynolds
17. Leah Ellem

== Results ==
=== Full internationals ===
Date	Score (Note: Philippines score given first)	Opponent	Tournament	Venue	Video	Report(s)
Oct 23, 2022	0–6	Malta	Test Match	New Era Stadium, Sydney	—	
Jan 28, 2023	38–0	Greece	Test Match	Lidcombe Oval, Sydney	—	
Oct 28, 2023	42–0	Malta	Test Match	New Era Stadium, Sydney		
