= Jamaica National League =

Rugby league competition in Jamaica

- Sport: Rugby league
- Founded: 2005
- No. of teams: 8
- Country: Jamaica

The National Club Championship is a rugby league competition held annually in Jamaica. It started in 2005 as the National Rugby League when four teams entered the competition and has since grown to eight.

== Structure ==
In 2022, the eight teams played each other once in the regular season. This was followed by a play-off series.

== Teams ==
Team	Formed	Suburb	City
Duhaney Park Red Sharks	2005	Duhaney Park	Kingston
JDF Warriors	2005	Kencot	Kingston
Liguanea Dragons		Liguanea	Kingston
Portmore Rugby League		Portmore	
St Bess Sledgehammers			
Thundercats			
West Kingston Hyenas		West Kingston	Kingston
Washington Blvd. Bulls	2013		Kingston

== Finals ==
List of finals
Year	Winning team	Score	Losing team	Ref.
2005	Vauxhall Vultures	32–20	Duhaney Park Red Sharks	
2006	Vauxhall Vultures	28–12	Duhaney Park Red Sharks	
2007	JDF Warriors	–	Duhaney Park Red Sharks	
2008	JDF Warriors	–	Duhaney Park Red Sharks	
2009		–		
2010	Vauxhall Rugby Club	36–14	Duhaney Park Red Sharks	
2011	Duhaney Park Red Sharks	20–18	Vauxhall Rugby Club	
2012	Vauxhall Vultures	30–16	Duhaney Park Red Sharks	
2013	Duhaney Park Red Sharks	28–23	Vauxhall Vultures	
2014	GC Foster College	36–16	Liguanea Dragons	
2015	Duhaney Park Red Sharks	–		
2016	Duhaney Park Red Sharks	50–8	GC Foster College	
2017	Duhaney Park Red Sharks	10–4	GC Foster College	
2018	Duhaney Park Red Sharks	56–12	JDF Warriors	
2019	Duhaney Park Red Sharks	24–16	GC Foster Angels	
2020	Season cancelled			
2021	Season cancelled			
2022	Duhaney Park Red Sharks	40–18	Washington Boulevard Bulls	
2023	Duhaney Park Red Sharks	32–20	Washington Boulevard Bulls	
2024	Duhaney Park Red Sharks	17–16	JDF Warriors	

== See also ==
- Jamaica national rugby league team
