= International rugby league in 2024 =

A list of men's, women's, and wheelchair senior international rugby league matches played throughout 2024.

A † denotes a match that did not contribute to the IRL World Rankings - i.e. not a senior international match (SIM) as designated by the International Rugby League (IRL). (Note: IRL defines a SIM as "any match in which a player represents a national federation, where such match has been sanctioned and recognised by IRL and the relevant national federations as a match played between senior national teams, which are national teams of a member national federation playing in a match for world rankings points.")

== Season overview ==
=== Men ===
Men's international tours
Start date	Touring side	Region	Results [Matches]
13 October	Lebanon	France	Tour cancelled
27 October	Samoa	England	0–2 [2]
4 December	United States	South Africa	2–0 [2]

Men's international friendlies
Date	Home team	Away team	Winners
4 February	North Macedonia	Chile	Chile
17 February	Montenegro	Serbia	Serbia
18 February	North Macedonia	Malta	Malta
24 February	Japan	Thailand	Thailand
1 March	United States	Canada	Match drawn
25 May	Greece	Norway	Greece
29 June	France	England	England
14 September	Netherlands	Scotland	Netherlands
21 September	Netherlands	Ireland	Ireland
21 September	Poland	Germany	Germany
28 September	Italy	Malta	Malta
28 September	Serbia	Netherlands	Netherlands
13 October	Japan	Hong Kong	Japan
15 October	Wales	Jamaica	Wales
18 October	Czech Republic	Ukraine	Ukraine
19 October	Canada	Jamaica	Canada
19 October	Czech Republic	Poland	Czech Republic
26 October	Philippines	Malta	Philippines
27 October	Scotland	Ireland	Ireland
1 December	Philippines	Hong Kong	Hong Kong
7 December	Albania	Greece	Greece

Men's international tournaments
Start date	Tournament	Winners
18 October	2024 Men's Pacific Cup	Australia
19 October	2024 Men's Pacific Bowl	Papua New Guinea
22 October	2026 Men's World Cup: European qualifying	France
29 November	2024 South American Championship	Chile

=== Women ===
Women's international tours
Start date	Touring side	Region	Results [Matches]
15 May	Kenya	Uganda	1–1 [2]

Women's international friendlies
Start date	Home team	Away team	Winners
28 January	Ghana	Nigeria	Nigeria
29 June	France	England	England
2 November	England	Wales	England

Women's international tournaments
Start date	Tournament	Winners
27 April	2026 Women's World Cup: European qualifying	France, Wales
19 September	2026 Women's World Cup: Middle East-Africa qualifying	Nigeria
19 October	2026 Women's World Cup: Asia-Pacific qualifying (2024 Women's Pacific Bowl)	Samoa
20 October	2024 Women's Pacific Cup	Australia
6 November	2026 Women's World Cup: Americas qualifying	Canada

=== Wheelchair ===
Wheelchair international tours
Start date	Touring side	Region	Results [Matches]
2 February	Wales	United States	2–0 [2]
1 November	Australia	New Zealand	2–0 [2]

Wheelchair international friendlies
Start date	Home team	Away team	Winners
26 October 2024	England	France	England
21 November 2024	Spain	England	England
21 November 2023	France	Ireland	France
23 November 2024	France	England	France

Wheelchair international tournaments
Start date	Tournament	Winners
8 June 2024	Celtic Cup	Ireland

== Rankings ==
The following were the rankings at the beginning of the season.

IRL Men's World Rankings
Official rankings as of 21 December 2023
Rank	Change	Team	Pts %
1	Steady	Australia	100.00
2	Steady	New Zealand	91.00
3	▲1	England	74.00
4	▼1	Samoa	70.00
5	Steady	Tonga	54.00
6	Steady	Papua New Guinea	50.00
7	Steady	Fiji	49.00
8	▲1	France	24.00
9	▼1	Lebanon	24.00
10	▲3	Cook Islands	22.00
11	▼1	Serbia	19.00
12	▲6	Netherlands	17.00
13	▲1	Italy	15.00
14	▲5	Malta	15.00
15	▲1	Greece	14.00
16	▼4	Ireland	14.00
17	▼6	Wales	13.00
18	▼3	Jamaica	10.00
19	▼2	Scotland	9.00
20	▲8	Ukraine	7.00
21	▲6	Czech Republic	7.00
22	▼1	Germany	6.00
23	▲10	Philippines	6.00
24	▲5	Poland	6.00
25	▲1	South Africa	5.00
26	▼4	Chile	5.00
27	▲4	Kenya	0.00
28	▲6	Norway	4.00
29	▼6	Nigeria	4.00
30	▼6	Ghana	4.00
31	▼6	Brazil	4.00
32	▼12	Turkey	3.00
33	▲4	United States	3.00
34	▲1	Bulgaria	3.00
35	▼5	Cameroon	2.00
36	▲2	Montenegro	2.00
37	▼5	Spain	2.00
38	▲6	Japan	1.00
39	New entry	Albania	1.00
40	▼4	Colombia	1.00
41	▲6	El Salvador	1.00
42	New entry	North Macedonia	1.00
43	▼1	Morocco	1.00
44	▼3	Sweden	0.00
45	Steady	Bosnia and Herzegovina	0.00
46	▼3	Canada	0.00
47	New entry	Niue	0.00
48	▼9	Solomon Islands	0.00
49	▼1	Belgium	0.00
50	▼10	Hungary	0.00
51	▼5	Vanuatu	0.00
52	▼3	Argentina	0.00
53	▼3	Denmark	0.00
54	▼3	Latvia	0.00
55	New entry	Estonia	0.00
Complete rankings at INTRL.SPORT

IRL Women's World Rankings
Official rankings as of December 2023
Rank	Change	Team	Pts %
1	Steady	Australia	100.00
2	Steady	New Zealand	90.00
3	Steady	England	65.00
4	▲1	Papua New Guinea	34.00
5	▼1	France	32.00
6	Steady	Cook Islands	27.00
7	Steady	Canada	25.00
8	▲1	Wales	22.00
9	▼1	Ireland	16.00
10	▲1	Greece	16.00
11	▼1	Brazil	13.00
12	Steady	Serbia	12.00
13	▲3	Tonga	12.00
14	Steady	Philippines	8.00
15	▼2	Italy	7.00
16	▲2	United States	7.00
17	▼2	Turkey	6.00
18	New entry	Netherlands	4.00
19	▼2	Malta	4.00
20	Steady	Samoa	4.00
21	▼2	Fiji	3.00
22	New entry	Jamaica	2.00
23	New entry	Nigeria	2.00
24	New entry	Kenya	2.00
26	New entry	Ghana	1.00
26	New entry	Uganda	1.00
27	▼6	Lebanon	1.00
28	▼6	Argentina	0.00
Complete rankings at INTRL.SPORT

IRL Wheelchair World Rankings
Official rankings as of December 2023
Rank	Change	Team	Pts %
1	Steady	England	100
2	Steady	France	88
3	Steady	Wales	59
4	Steady	Australia	48
5	Steady	Ireland	42
6	Steady	Scotland	31
7	Steady	Spain	22
8	Steady	United States	19
9	Steady	Italy	0
Complete rankings at INTRL.SPORT

== January ==
=== Wales wheelchair v Army ===
14 January 2024
13:30 GMT (UTC+00:00)

Wales	34–24†	Army
Tries: Trigg-Turner (17, 32), Preece (19), Lane (26, 47), Jones (59); Goals: Higgins 3/5, Preece 2/2	1st: 22–20; 2nd: 12–4; Report	Tries: Stancliffe (3, 54), Simpson (29), Burton-Carter (37), Sampher (40); Goals: Norfolk 0/1, Burton-Carter 2/4

Cwmbran

=== Ghana women v Nigeria ===
28 January 2024
15:00 (UTC+00:00)

Ghana	20–30	Nigeria
Tries: Anafo, Wuaku, Tahiru, Tettey; Goals: Tettey (2/4)	1st: 16–14; 2nd: 4–16; Report	Tries: Aladegelu, Blessing, Rukayat (2), Chinaza, Vera; Goals: Augusta (3/6)

University of Ghana Stadium, Accra
Referee: Olatunbosun Johnson (Nigeria)

Team details
Ghana		Position	Nigeria
Name	Number	Position	Number	Name
Fati Bhom	1	FB	1	Blessing Aladegelu
Cynthia Anafo	2	WG	2	Samson Godfirst
Shamsiya Tahiru	3	CE	3	Bayere Lauretta
Ivy Benyah	4	CE	4	Innocent Adaeze
Millicent Mjomaba	5	WG	5	Umude Blessing
Elizabeth dongo	6	SO	6	Nwankpa Chioma
Jacqueline Anash	7	SH	7	Mene Augusta
Fauzia Nurudeen Larry	8	PR	8	Oseni Muinat
Rosemary Sewornu	9	HK	9	Akinade Rukayat
Gracelove Hammond	10	PF	10	Abbah Chinaza
Sheila Tettey	11	SR	11	Elizabeth Adie
Hilaria Wuaku	12	SR	12	Akhihiero Vera
Marceline Ashie	13	LF	13	Imoisi Abuoybo
Jennifer Moncar	14	IN	14	Jimoh Rukayat
Estelle Haizel	15	IN	15	Iyoha Success
Eunice Lakioe	16	IN	16	Ruth Odey
Belinda Ayele Khakuvie	17	IN	17	Endurance Ukwuoma
Riddick Alibah.		Coach		Samson Okeowo

== February ==
=== United States wheelchair v Wales ===
2 February 2024
19:00 EST (UTC-05:00)

United States	24–78	Wales
Tries: Wolf (2), Johnson (2), Kingsley; Goals: Johnson (1/2), Stewart (1/3)	1st: 14–36; Report	Tries: Trigg-Turner (4), Preece (3), Higgins (3), Boyd-Ward (2), Jones; Goals: Higgins (11/12), Trigg-Turner (1/1), Jones (1/1)

Myrtle Beach Sports Center, Myrtle Beach
Referees: Kim Abel (England), Peter Garlando (USA)

Team details
United States		Position	Wales
Name	Number	Position	Number	Name
Mackenzie Johnson	1	Starter	1	Scott Trigg-Turner
Micah Stewart	2	Starter	2	Andrew Higgins
Chayse Wolf	3	Starter	3	Martin Lane
William Johnstone	4	Starter	4	Gary Preece
Andy Kingsley	5	Starter	5	Jodie Boyd-Ward
Jesse Lind	6	Interchange	6	Harry Jones
Jabrier Lee	7	Interchange	7	Philip Davies
Freddie Smith	8	Interchange	8	Alex Powell
Gabi Cha	9	CS	9	Mason Baker
Geoff Mason		Coach		Alan Caron

3 February 2024
15:00 EST (UTC-05:00)

United States	22–52	Wales
Tries: Lind, Johnson (2), Wolf; Goals: Stewart (2/3), Wolf (1/1)	1st: 0–28; Report	Tries: Boyd-Ward (2), Preece (2), Lane (2), Higgins (3); Goals: Higgins (8/9)

Myrtle Beach Sports Center, Myrtle Beach
Referees: Peter Garlando (USA), Kim Abel (England)

Team details
United States		Position	Wales
Name	Number	Position	Number	Name
Micah Stewart	1	Starter	1	Gary Preece
Mackenzie Johnson	2	Starter	2	Andrew Higgins
Chayse Wolf	3	Starter	3	Martin Lane
Andy Kingsley	4	Starter	4	Jodie Boyd-Ward
Jabrier Lee	5	Starter	5	Scott Trigg-Turner
William Johnstone	6	Interchange	6	Alex Powell
Gabi Cha	7	Interchange	7	Stephen Halsey
Jesse Lind	8	Interchange	8	Philip Davies
Freddie Smith	9	CS	9	Harry Jones
Geoff Mason		Coach		Alan Caron

=== North Macedonia men v Chile in Australia ===
4 February 2024
16:00 AEDT (UTC+11:00)

North Macedonia	22–36	Chile
Tries: Gouganovski (2), Mirceski, Kostevski; Goals: Suleski (3/4)	Report	Tries: Sandoval, Garrido, Doberer, Black (2), Vasquez; Goals: Black (6/7)

Forshaw Park, Sydney
Referee: Luke Saldern (Australia)

Team details
North Macedonia		Position	Chile
Name	Number	Position	Number	Name
Elia Georgievski	1	FB	1	Javier Ramirez Ley
Angelo Avramovski	2	WG	2	Christian Sandoval
Xanda Georgievski	3	CE	3	Sebastian De La Paz
Aledin Hrvat	4	CE	4	Ben Fisher
Jayden Gouganovski	5	WG	5	Jayden Jorquera
Josh Moncaster	6	SO/FE	6	Thomas Garrido
James Suleski	7	SH/HB	7	Christian Lopez
Jayden Foye	8	PR	8	Brandon Tobar
Jake Mitrevski	9	HK	9	Mitch Black
James Mirceski	10	PF	10	Austin Olivares
Dean Kulevski	11	SR	11	Nick Doberer
Jake Boslovski	12	SR	12	Dylan Concha Attard
Jamie Miletic	13	LF/LK	13	Daniel Vasquez
Josh Kosteski	14	IN	14	Jay Jiminez
Jimmy Kostevski	15	IN	15	Chris Castillo
Josh Boicheski	16	IN	16	Zane Artesi
Justin Petrovski	17	IN	17	Patrick Caamano
Aaron Zammit		Coach		Andrew Charles/Rod Millar

=== Montenegro men v Serbia ===
17 February 2024
19:00 CET (UTC+01:00)

Montenegro	34–52	Serbia
Tries: Ivanovic, Cullen (2), Dedic (2), Novakovic; Goals: Popovic (5/6)	Report	Tries: Cecaric (3), Markovic, Stosic, Bibic, Stoiljkovic, Ilic (2); Goals: Stoiljkovic (7/8), Cecaric (1/1)

Stadion u Parku, Tivat
Referee: Nenad Zujic (Serbia)

Team details
Montenegro		Position	Serbia
Name	Number	Position	Number	Name
Marko Novakovic	1	FB	1	Bojan Cecaric
James Cullen	2	WG	2	Aleksa Zivojinovic
Marko Andric	3	CE	3	Luka Ilic
Edouard Hardy	4	CE	4	Aleksandar Markovic
Milos Dasic	5	WG	5	Jovan Loncar
Srdjan Popovic	6	SO	6	Silver Zenuni
Vladislav Dedic	7	SH	7	Luka Stosic
Danilo Kosanovic	8	PR	8	Starhinja Stoiljkovic
Ilija Ivanovic	9	HK	9	Mihailo Tomic
Andrija Dakic	10	PF	10	Stefan Novakovic
Elvis Cemaj	11	SR	11	Luka Trifunovic
Redzep Baljaj	12	SR	12	Enis Bibic
Balsa Zarkovic	13	LF	13	Marko Cuk
Stevan Radonjic	14	IN	14	Mihajlo Markovic
Bojan Mizdalo	15	IN	15	Luka Bojicic
Burim Brahimi	16	IN	16	Filip Nesic
Nermin Kovacevic	17	IN	17	Stevan Ivankovic
Darren Fisher		Coach		Ian Giddings

=== North Macedonia men v Malta in Australia ===
18 February 2024
15:00 AEDT (UTC+11:00)

North Macedonia	18–22	Malta
Tries: Mirceski, Tui Georgievski, Xanda Georgievski; Goals: Suleski (3/3)	Report	Tries: Justin Rodrigues, Galea, Foote, Zac Rodrigues; Goals: Galea (3/4)

Forshaw Park, Sydney
Referee: Billy Greatbatch (Australia)

Team details
North Macedonia		Position	Malta
Name	Number	Position	Number	Name
Elia Georgievski	1	FB	1	Zarrin Galea
Jimmy Kostevski	2	WG	2	Eli Foote
Aledin Hrvat	3	CE	3	Zac Rodrigues
Tui Georgievski	4	CE	4	Logan Sipple
Jayden Gouganovski	5	WG	5	Marcus Muscat
Justin Miletic	6	SO/FE	6	Riley Tonna
James Suleski	7	SH/HB	7	Justin Rodrigues
James Mirceski	8	PR	8	Zac Vella
Jake Mitrevski	9	HK	9	Ryan Azzopardi
Josh Boicheski	10	PF	10	Anthony Bucca
Dean Kulevski	11	SR	11	Braydon Sherry
Xanda Georgievski	12	SR	12	Kade Fabri
Josh Kosteski	13	LF/LK	13	Carlo Cassar
Jamie Miletic	14	IN	14	Lachlan Mifsud
Josh Moncaster	15	IN	15	John Azzopardi
Bradley Moncaster	16	IN	16	Luke Sherry
Michael Boskovski	17	IN	17	Tyson Jackson
Aaron Zammit		Coach		Aaron McDonald

=== Japan men v Thailand in Australia ===
24 February 2024
15:00 AEDT (UTC+11:00)

Japan	0–46	Thailand

Forestville Park, Sydney

Team details
Japan		Position	Thailand
Name	Number	Position	Number	Name
Travis Drury	1	FB	1	Nat Inthajarn Blud
Harry Hooper	2	WG	2	See Nyo Mint
Alistair Carless	3	CE	3	James Utai Cairns
Yuchi Mori	4	CE	4	Brooklyn Bretlen
Sou Miyake	5	WG	5	Eric Han
Tai Hooper	6	FE	6	Matthew Waugh
Reiji Sano	7	HB	7	Moo Doh
Andrew Williams	8	PR	8	Carlin Millar
Rex Kobayashi	9	HK	9	Vissut Domklang
Hiroshi Fukusawa	10	PF	10	Theo Doh
Kazuki Otake	11	SR	11	Rhys Tucker
Kensuke Horikoshi	12	SR	12	Joshua Philalack
Darcy Heaney	13	LK	13	Brandan Sua
Tom Bowes	14	IN	14	George Po
Tomoki Nobeta	15	IN	15	Suriyet Odthon
Shin Hashimoto	16	IN	16	Sha Aung
Ed Craig	17	IN	17	Brenden Bretlen
Takenari Yamaguchi	18	RES	18	Matthew Squires
Willie Lux		Coach		Matt Murray-Robinson

== March ==
=== United States men v Canada ===
1 March 2024
19:00 PT (UTC-07:00)

United States	16–16	Canada
Tries: Burroughs, Martin, Granby; Goals: McCrory (1/3), Granby (1/1)	Report	Tries: Carpenter, Dumas, Mahovic; Goals: Bourne (2/3)

Ed W. Clark High School, Las Vegas
Referee: Cody Kuxman (USA)

Team details
United States		Position	Canada
Name	Number	Position	Number	Name
David Washington	1	FB	1	Dillon Hamilton
James Williams	2	WG	2	Josh Michalik
Ryan Burroughs	3	CE	3	Luke Toroca
Jason Martin	4	CE	4	Lee Keegel
Kyle Granby	5	WG	5	Colton Carpenter
Ryan Bannerot	6	SO	6	Blake Mahovic
Peter Lupton	7	SH	7	Jacob Bourne
Malcolm Webb	8	PR	8	Dave Astley
Mason McCrory	9	HK	9	Ben Stothers
Tevita Bryce	10	PF	10	Charles Curran
Gunnar Johnson	11	SR	11	Jason Chuck
Wes Piggins	12	SR	12	Jason Park
Joe Eichner	13	LF	13	Scyler Dumas
Matt Finnesy	14	IN	14	Kyle Yurkiw
Ethan Ferrick	15	IN	15	Dan Martyn
Fatai Makavaha	16	IN	16	Niko Andrianos
Andre Whaley	17	IN	17	Danny Tupou
Sean Rutgerson		Coach		Aaron Zimmerle

== April ==
=== 2026 Women's World Cup, Europe qualifying ===
==== Preliminary playoff ====
27 April 2024
15:00 CEST (UTC+02:00)

Italy	6–56	Netherlands
Tries: Severgnini; Goals: Antonia (1/1)	1st: 6–20; 2nd: 0–36; Report	Tries: Gevers (3), Geerlings, Van Beukering, Berding, N. Kennedy (3), Blom, Van Diepen; Goals: Berding (4/8), Schouw (0/1), Geerlings (1/1), Van der Zwan (1/1)

Maurizio Quaggia Stadium, Mogliano Veneto
Referee: Nenad Zujic (Serbia)

Team details
Italy		Position	Netherlands
Name	Number	Position	Number	Name
Alessandra Menotti	1	FB	1	Nicole Kennedy
Rwan Hassnien	2	WG	2	Hiermons Monischa
Loide Agosta	3	CE	3	Lisa Berding
Camilla Giacomazzo	4	CE	4	Paige Schouw
Lillian Bremang	5	WG	5	Hannah Van Beukering
Martina Dall' Antonia	6	SO	6	Hiske Blom
Valentina Virgili	7	SH	7	Rixt Aerts
Giulia Iozzi	8	PR	8	Sele Steenkist
Camilla Vio	9	HK	9	Ver Van Der Zwan
Vanessa Bertini	10	PF	10	Lorraine Voorbach
Silvis Gai	11	SR	11	Linneke Gevers
Altea Forto	12	SR	12	Sylvie Moelee
Marvin Severgnini	13	LF	13	Kaylee Geerlings
Alissa Meinero	14	IN	14	Claire Kennedy
Alice Botiaro	15	IN	15	Dominique Velema
Ilenia Bollini	16	IN	16	Dana Burik
Fabiola Tosetii	17	IN	17	Stephanie Van Diepen
Alberto Suin		Coach		Matt Rigby

==== Group stage ====
Group A
Pos	Team	Pld	W	D	L	PF	PA	PD	Pts	Qualification
1	Wales	2	2	0	0	76	16	+60	4	Qualify for 2026 World Cup
2	Ireland	2	1	0	1	26	40	−14	2	Advance to World Series play-off
3	Netherlands	2	0	0	2	18	64	−46	0	

Source: ERL

27 April 2024
14:45 BST (UTC+01:00)

Wales	28–10	Ireland
Tries: Dainton (2), Taylor, Salter, Parker; Goals: Salter (4/5)	1st: 18–4; 2nd: 10–6; Report	Tries: Tutty, Molloy; Goals: Cobain (1/3)

Cardiff University Sports Fields, Cardiff
Attendance: 300
Referee: Sam Jenkinson (England)

Team details
Wales		Position	Ireland
Name	Number	Position	Number	Name
Brittony Price	1	FB	1	Cliodhna O'Sullivan
Georgia Taylor	2	WG	2	Bettie Lambert
Ashlea Prescott	3	CE	3	Molly Young
Kathryn Salter	4	CE	4	Francessca Copley
Lucia Davies	5	WG	5	Grace Tutty
Shaunni Davies	6	SO	6	Holly O'Dwyer
Rhi Parker	7	SH	7	Alex McGuinness
Amy Price	8	PR	8	Mairead Quinn
Jasmine Gibbons	9	HK	9	Niamh Griffin
Sara Jones	10	PF	10	Rachel Morton
Hannah Jones	11	SR	11	Storm Cobain
Charlie Mundy	12	SR	12	Tricia Doyle
Bethan Dainton	13	LF	13	Clodagh Dunne
Agnes Wood	14	IN	14	Megan Preston
Katie Carr	15	IN	15	Caoimhe Molloy
Ffion Jenkins	16	IN	16	lydia Egan
Kim Boaler	17	IN	17	Lisa Callen
Tom Brindle		Coach		Matt Kennerson

19 May 2024
15:00 IST (UTC+01:00)

Ireland	16–12	Netherlands
Tries: Preston, Cobain (2); Goals: Cobain (2/3)	Report	Tries: Van Der Zwan, N. Kennedy, J. Kennedy

Donnybrook Stadium, Dublin
Referee: Fabien Nicaud (France)

Team details
Ireland		Position	Netherlands
Name	Number	Position	Number	Name
Cliodhna O'Sullivan	1	FB	1	Nicole Kennedy
Alice Fitzegerald	2	WG	2	Monischa Hiermons
Francessca Copley	3	CE	3	Claire Kennedy
Mollie Young	4	CE	4	Linneke Gevers
Bettie Lambert	5	WG	5	Hannah Van Beukering
Storm Cobain	6	SO	6	Hiske Blom
Alex McGuinness	7	SH	7	Rixt Aerts
Mairead Quinn	8	PR	8	Sela Steenkist
Megan Preston	9	HK	9	Vera Van Der Zwan
Clodagh Dunne	10	PF	10	Lorraine Voorbach
Lisa Callan	11	SR	11	Jessica Kennedy
Tricia Doyle	12	SR	12	Sylvie Moelee
Caoimhe Molloy	13	LF	13	Lisa Berding
Niamh Griffin	14	IN	14	Paige Schouw
Rachel Morton	15	IN	15	Iris Hansman
Aine Rutley	16	IN	16	Dominique Velema
Stacy Hanley	17	IN	17	Stephanie Van Diepen
		RES	18	Arijanna Van Der Kieft
Matt Jefferson		Coach		Matt Rigby

22 June 2024
16:00 CEST (UTC+02:00)

Netherlands	6–48	Wales
Tries: Moelee; Goals: Geerlings (1/1)	Report	Tries: Burnell (2), Price, Gough-Walters (3), Salter, Wood, H Jones, Dainton; Goals: Salter (2/7), Burnell (2/3)

RC Waterland, Purmerend, Netherlands
Referee: Geoffrey Poumes (France)

Team details
Netherlands		Position	Wales
Name	Number	Position	Number	Name
Nicole Kennedy	1	FB	1	Leanne Burnell
Monischa Hiermons	2	WG	2	Megan Whittaker
Lisa Berding	3	CE	3	Kathryn Salter
Linneke Gevers	4	CE	4	Seren Gough-Walters
Hannah Van Beukering	5	WG	5	Britonny Price
Rixt Aerts	6	SO	6	Rhi Parker
Hiske Blom	7	SH	7	Shaunni Davies
Sela Steenkist	8	PR	8	Amy Price
Ver Van Der Zwan	9	HK	9	Jasmine Gibbons
Lorraine Voorbach	10	PF	10	Sara Jones
Carola Terlouw	11	SR	11	Hannah Jones
Sylvie Moelee	12	SR	12	Georgia Taylor
Kaylee Geerlings	13	LF	13	Bethan Dainton
Dominique Velema	14	IN	14	Agnes Wood
Claire Kennedy	15	IN	15	Katie Carr
Kim Dekker	16	IN	16	Gracie Hobbs
Iris Hansman	17	IN	17	Ffion Jones
Matt Rigby		Coach		Tom Brindle

Group B
Pos	Team	Pld	W	D	L	PF	PA	PD	Pts	Qualification
1	France	2	2	0	0	116	0	+116	4	Qualify for 2026 World Cup
2	Greece	2	1	0	1	32	62	−30	2	Advance to World Series play-off
3	Serbia	2	0	0	2	4	90	−86	0	

Source: ERL

13 April 2024
16:00 CEST (UTC+02:00)

France	58–0	Greece
Tries: Song-Puche, Canal (4), Legout, Vilanove (3), Ramos, Himoudi (2); Goals: Pommier (5/12)	1st: 28–0; 2nd: 30–0; Report

Stade Georges Dartiailh, Marmande
Attendance: 1,112
Referee: James Spencer (Ireland)

Team details
France		Position	Greece
Name	Number	Position	Number	Name
Manon Samarra	1	FB	1	Magdelini Stavrianou
Margot Canal	2	WG	2	Velissaria Koutsioumpa
Cristina Song-Puche	3	CE	3	Dimitra Papoutsi
Amael Vilanove	4	CE	4	Christina Macris
Chahrazad Himoudi	5	WG	5	Sofia Anagnostopoulou
Justine Roses	6	SO	6	Cleopatra Velmachou
Mahault Pommier	7	SH	7	Asimina Mastoraki
Salomé Ségala	8	PR	8	Marianna Chali,
Fanny Ramos	9	HK	9	Chrysi Lymperidi
Leila Bessahli	10	PF	10	Anna Limperi
Ines Legout	11	SR	11	Maria-Eleni Gkirlemi
Stecy Bessiere	12	SR	12	Myrsini Pappa
Dorine Samarra	13	LF	13	Ourania Koutsikou
Helene Leclerc	14	IN	14	Georgia-Fotini Koutsimpogeorgou
Pauline Noe	15	IN	15	Ekaterini Varypati
Nabila Zaghdoudi	16	IN	16	Maria-Anna Lamprou
Tallis Kuresa	17	IN	17	Sofia-Margarita Kitsaneli
Romain Maillot		Coach		Jim Minadakis

18 May 2024
17:00 EEST (UTC+03:00)

Greece	32–4	Serbia
Tries: Papoutsi (2), Lamprou (2), Koutsikou, Koutsimpogeorgou, Koutsioumpa; Goals: Pappa (2/4)	Report	Tries: Simic

Agios Dimitrios Stadium, Athens
Referee: James Jones (Wales)

Team details
Greece		Position	Serbia
Name	Number	Position	Number	Name
Kleopatra Velmachou	1	FB	1	Tamara Bošnjak
Velissaria Koutsioumpa	2	WG	2	Katarina Veljanovski
Dimitra Papoutsi	3	CE	3	Teodora Micic
Christina Macris	4	CE	4	Anastasija Karanovic
Magdelini Stavrianou	5	WG	5	Jelena Stoiljković
Asimina Mastoraki	6	SO	6	Natasa Kovacevic
Sofia-Margarita Kitsaneli	7	SH	7	Lea Milosevic
Maria-Anna Lamprou	8	PR	8	Marija Maslakovic
Chrysi Lymperidi	9	HK	9	Karolina Blizanac
Marie Eleni Gkirlemi	10	PF	10	Anna Liuter
Myrsini Pappa	11	SR	11	Sanja Starcevic
Anna Limperi	12	SR	12	Natalija Simic
Ourania Koutsikou	13	LF	13	Cleopatra Carreno
Sofia Anagnostopoulou	14	IN	14	Jovana Fridl
Marianna Chali	15	IN	15	Uma Cengaj
Georgia-Fotini Koutsimpogeorgou	16	IN	16	Nika Bajic
Sotiria Skouroliakou	17	IN	17	Dunja Stojiljkovic
Jim Minadakis		Coach		Slobodan Manak

22 June 2024
17:00 CEST (UTC+02:00)

Serbia	0–58	France
	Report	Tries: Monsarrat, Song-Puche (3), Kessely (2), Ramazeilles (2), Samarra, Roses; Goals: Diraison (9/10)

Stadium FC Srem Jakovo, Belgrade
Referee: Jarda Bzoch (Czech Republic)

Team details
Serbia		Position	France
Name	Number	Position	Number	Name
Tamara Bosnjak	1	FB	1	Manon Samarra
Teodora Micic	2	WG	2	Chahrazad Himoudi
Sanja Starcevic	3	CE	3	Cristina Song-Puche
Marija Stojsic	4	CE	4	Amael Vilanove
Anastasija Karanovic	5	WG	5	Perle Ramazeilles
Ljiljana Bajic	6	SO	6	Justine Roses
Katarina Veljanovski	7	SH	7	Lisa Diraison
Natalija Simic	8	PR	8	Haoua Kessely
Natasa Kovacevic	9	HK	9	Mahault Pommier
Teodora Marin	10	PF	10	Perrine Monsarrat
Mihaela Markicevic	11	SR	11	Ines Legout
Anna Liuter	12	SR	12	Dorine Samarra
Marija Maslakovic	13	LF	13	Leila Bessahli
Marija Simovic	14	IN	14	Noemie Samuel
Milica Cvijetanovic	15	IN	15	Salome Segala
Nika Bajic	16	IN	16	Pauline Noe
Uma Cengaj	17	IN	17	Tallis Kuresa
Slobodan Manak		Coach		Romain Maillot

==== World Series playoff ====
12 October 2024
15:00 EEST (UTC+03:00)

Greece	6–42	Ireland
Tries: Lamprou; Goals: Pappa (1/1)	Report	Tries: Doyle, Fitzegerald, Molloy, O'Dwyer, Lambert (2), McGuinness, Tutty; Goals: Cobain (5/8)

Gkorytsa Stadium, Athens
Referee: T. Jones (England)

Team details
Greece		Position	Ireland
Name	Number	Position	Number	Name
Cleopatra Velmachou	1	FB	1	Cliodhna O'Sullivan
Magdelini Stavrianou	2	WG	2	Alice Fitzegerald
Dimitra Papoutsi	3	CE	3	Holly O'Dwyer
Chrysi Lymperidi	4	CE	4	Grace Tutty
Sotiria Skouroliakou	5	WG	5	Bethany Lambert
Asimina Mastoraki	6	SO	6	Jade Walker
Sophia Margarita Kitsaneli	7	SH	7	Alex McGuinness
Ourania Koutsikou	8	PR	8	Clodagh Dunne
Effie Skouroliakou	9	HK	9	Polly Roberts
Maria-Eleni Gkirlemi	10	PF	10	Stacy Hanley
Isaia Maragkou	11	SR	11	Storm Cobain
Anais Dragoumis	12	SR	12	Tricia Doyle
Myrsini Pappa	13	LF	13	Iona McCusker
Sophia Anagnostopoulou	14	IN	14	Anna Potterton
Triantafyllia Vasilogianni	15	IN	15	Orlaith McAuliffe
Maria-Anna Lamprou	16	IN	16	Caoimhe Molloy
Aimilia Kozari	17	IN	17	Mairead Quinn
Jim Minadakis		Coach		Matt Kennerson

== May ==
=== Uganda women v Kenya ===
15 May 2024
14:00 EAT (UTC+03:00)

Uganda	16–18	Kenya
Tries: Immaculate, Nakityo, Ira; Goals: Najjuma (2/5)	Report	Tries: Chitechi, Khatenje, Salamba; Goals: Chitechi (3/7)

Elite Stadium, Kampala
Referee: Scott Lubukha (Kenya)

Team details
Uganda		Position	Kenya
Name	Number	Position	Number	Name
Isabella Ira	1	FB	1	Milkah Chitechi
Doreen Kyomuhendo	2	WG	2	Maxine Abuja
Nema Sarah Alanyo	3	CE	3	Vivian Anyango
Kirabo Cabrine	4	CE	4	Lovinah Mijere
Yvonne Najjuma	5	WG	5	Lawnisky Munayi
Aisha Nakityo	6	SO	6	Cynthia Chepkemoi
Peace Mungufimaniibo	7	SH	7	Margaret Wanjiru
Ninissma Immaculate	8	PR	8	Sharon Bosibori
Lucky Melan Nirere	9	HK	9	Susan Wangechi
Suzan Ageno-rwot	10	PF	10	Esther Ongiri
Nantongo Phiona	11	SR	11	Dorothy Mulela
Tegutumwa Zurah	12	SR	12	Sophye Nabwire
Judith Ntakirutimana	13	LF	13	Mercy Khatenje
Sarah Namutebi	14	IN	14	Tracy Khan Osicho
Doreen Kyomuhendo	15	IN	15	Christine Oketch
Bonet Irankunda	16	IN	16	Dorris Kimani
Rachel Chizanye	17	IN	17	Angel Salamba
Fortunate Irankunda		Coach		Antonio Lombardo

15 May 2024
14:00 EAT (UTC+03:00)

Uganda	13–12	Kenya
Tries: Ira (2), Phiona; Drop goals: Alanyo (1)	Report	Tries: Chitechi, Osicho; Goals: Chitechi (2/3); Drop goals: Munayi (1), Chepkemoi (1)

Elite Stadium, Kampala
Referee: Brian Odikluort (Kenya)

Team details
Uganda		Position	Kenya
Name	Number	Position	Number	Name
Isabella Ira	1	FB	1	Lawnisky Munayi
Doreen Kyabuya	2	WG	2	Maxine Abuga
Nema Sarah Alanyo	3	CE	3	Susan Wangechi
Tegutumwa Zurah	4	CE	4	Lovinah Mijere
Doreen Kyomuhendo	5	WG	5	Mary Ngendo
Cabrine Kirabo	6	SO	6	Cynthia Chepkemoi
Joan Uwamahoro	7	SH	7	Margaret Wanjiru
Ninissma Immaculate	8	PR	8	Sharon Bosibori
Lucky Melan Nirere	9	HK	9	Milkah Chitechi
Susan Agenorwot	10	PF	10	Dorris Kimani
Nantongo Phiona	11	SR	11	Dorothy Mulela
Judith Ntakirutimana	12	SR	12	Sophye Nabwire
Bonet Irankunda	13	LF	13	Angel Salamba
Sarah Namutebi	14	IN	14	Vivian Anyango
Rachel Chizanye	15	IN	15	Christine Oketch
Fortunate Irankunda	16	IN	16	Esther Ongiri
Salama Uwamahoro	17	IN	17	Tracy Khan Osicho
Fortunate Irankunda		Coach		Antonio Lombardo

=== Greece men v Norway ===
25 May 2024
17:00 EEST (UTC+03:00)

Greece	34–26	Norway
Tries: Nake, Tuliatu (2), Fragkos, Varypatis, Mavreas; Goals: Vrahnos (3/4), Tsakalos (2/2)	Report	Tries: Olsen, Galic (3), Soiland, Høyland; Goals: Mellor-King (1/6)

Agios Dimitrios Municipal Stadium, Athens
Referee: Stephane Vincent (France)

Team details
Greece		Position	Norway
Name	Number	Position	Number	Name
Ioannis Nake	1	FB	1	Frank Kiriinya
Georgios Chionis	2	WG	2	Denis Galic
Ioannis Fragkos	3	CE	3	Arne Oma Torsen
Panagiotis Varypatis	4	CE	4	Martin Høyland
Alexandros Mikelopulos	5	WG	5	Magnus Lima Soiland
Aris Dardamanis	6	SO	6	Jymaal Mellor-King
Adam Vrahnos	7	SH	7	Stephen Mwikar
Nectarios Tsakalos	8	PR	8	Mathias Vada Stenseth-Holm
Nikolaos Stefanou	9	HK	9	Kristoffer Milligan
Stefanos Bastas	10	PF	10	Nils Holte
Alexandros Aliu	11	SR	11	Simon Olsen
Nikolos Mavreas	12	SR	12	Marius Odland Sagelv
Robert Tuliatu	13	LF	13	Brett Harvey
Athanasios Lamprou	14	IN	14	Eric Mellor
Emmanouil Koufakis	15	IN	15	Kristian Vanthe
Brandon Onyango	16	IN	16	Sveinung Fludal
Petros Bafaloukas	17	IN	17	Oliver Falk
Robert Tuliatu		Coach		Liam Stead

== June ==
=== Celtic Cup (wheelchair) ===
8 June 2024
10:30 IST (UTC+01:00)

Ireland	68–34	Scotland
Tries: Burton-Carter (2), Johnston (4), Calcott (3), Spain, McCarthy, Roberts; Goals: Johnston (8/9), Calcott (2/3)	Report	Tries: Davidson (2), Willans, Grant, Hill (3); Goals: Willans (3/4), Grant (0/2)

Kingfisher Club, University of Galway, Ireland
Referees: Jake Brook (England), David Roig (France)

Team details
Ireland		Position	Scotland
Name	Number	Position	Number	Name
Peter Johnston	1	Starter	1	Daniel Grant
Toby Burton-Carter	2	Starter	2	Michael Grant
Melanie Griffiths	3	Starter	3	Connor Blackmore
Phil Roberts	4	Starter	4	Calum Davidson
Joe Calcott	5	Starter	5	Gregor Anderson
Oran Spain	6	Interchange	6	John Willans
James McCarthy	7	Interchange	7	Graeme Stewart
Maurice Noonan	8	Interchange	8	Dave Hill
Cian Horgan	9	9th player	9	Calum Japes
Phil Roberts		Coach		Mark Roughsedge

8 June 2024
12:30 IST (UTC+01:00)

Scotland	64–52	Wales
Tries: Hill (2), Blackmore (3), Willans (2), Davidson (2), Grant (2); Goals: Grant (10/11)	Report	Tries: Sargent (3), Davies, Powell (2), Trigg-Turner (4); Goals: Trigg-Turner (6/10)

Kingfisher Club, University of Galway, Ireland
Referees: David Butler (England), Steve Hogan (Ireland)

Team details
Scotland		Position	Wales
Name	Number	Position	Number	Name
John Willians	1	Starter	1	Mason Baker
Daniel Grant	2	Starter	2	Alex Powell
Connor Blackmore	3	Starter	3	Philip Davies
Michael Grant	4	Starter	4	Scott Trigg-Turner
Dave Hill	5	Starter	5	Richard Carver
Graeme Stewart	6	Interchange	6	Martin Turner
Calum Davidson	7	Interchange	7	Lee Sargent
Calum Japes	8	Interchange	8	Jess Booth
Gregor Anderson	9	9th player	9	Mark Williams
Mark Roughsedge		Coach		Alan Caron

8 June 2024
14:30 IST (UTC+01:00)

Ireland	68–32	Wales
Tries: Roberts, McCarthy, Calcott (2), Johnston (3), Horgan (2), Spain (3); Goals: Johnston (9/11), Joe Calcott (1/1)	Report	Tries: Williams (2), Davies, Turner (2), Trigg-Turner; Goals: Trigg-Turner (3/4), Turner (1/2)

Kingfisher Club, University of Galway, Ireland
Referees: David Roig (France), David Butler (England)

Team details
Ireland		Position	Wales
Name	Number	Position	Number	Name
Peter Johnston	1	Starter	1	Scott Trigg-Turner
Phil Roberts	2	Starter	2	Alex Powell
Joe Calcott	3	Starter	3	Martin Turner
Cian Horgan	4	Starter	4	Richard Carver
James McCarthy	5	Starter	5	Philip Davies
Melanie Griffiths	6	Interchange	6	Mark Williams
Oran Spain	7	Interchange	7	Mason Baker
Ellie Sheehy	8	Interchange	8	Lee Sargent
Toby Burton-Carter	9	9th player	9	Jess Booth
Phil Roberts		Coach		Alan Caron

=== France v England double header ===
Women's

29 June 2024
15:30 CEST (UTC+02:00)

France	0–42	England
	Report	Tries: Davies (2), Hardcastle, Hetherington, Harris, Travis, Partington, Rudge; Goals: Rowe (5/8)

Stade Ernest-Wallon, Toulouse
Attendance: 1,200
Referee: Geoffrey Poumes (France)

Team details
France		Position	England
Name	Number	Position	Number	Name
Manon Samarra	1	FB	1	Georgie Hetherington
Chahrazad Himoudi	2	WG	2	Eboni Partington
Christina Song Puche	3	CE	3	Caitlin Beevers
Amael Vilanove	4	CE	4	Amy Hardcastle
Perle Ramazeilles	5	WG	5	Anna Davies
Justine Roses	6	SO	6	Zoe Harris
Lisa Diraison	7	SH	7	Isabel Rowe
Elisa Akpa	8	PR	8	Olivia Wood
Mahault Pommier	9	HK	9	Keara Bennett
Salome Segala	10	PF	10	Shona Hoyle
Ines Legout	11	SR	11	Paige Travis
Stecy Bessiere	12	SR	12	Emily Rudge
Leila Bessahli	13	LF	13	Jodie Cunningham
Perrine Monsarrat	14	IN	14	Katie Mottershead
Haoua Kessely	15	IN	15	Vicky Whitfield
Tallis Kuresa	16	IN	16	Zoe Hornby
Pauline Noe	17	IN	17	Bella Sykes
Romain Maillot		Coach		Stuart Barrow

Men's

29 June 2024
18:00 CEST (UTC+02:00)

France	8–40	England
Tries: Yaha; Goals: Morgue (2/2)	Report	Tries: Welsby (2), Handley (2), Johnstone (2), Nicholson, Williams; Goals: Smith (4/8)

Stade Ernest-Wallon, Toulouse
Attendance: 4,907
Referee: Tom Grant (England)

Team details
France		Position	England
Name	Number	Position	Number	Name
Arthur Mourge	1	FB	1	Jack Welsby
Fouah Yaha	2	WG	2	Tom Johnstone
Matthieu Laguerre	3	CE	3	Sam Wood
Enzo Griffier	4	CE	4	Harry Newman
Hakim Miloudi	5	WG	5	Ash Handley
Cesar Rouge	6	SO	6	George Williams
Theo Fages	7	SH	7	Harry Smith
Romain Navarette	8	PR	8	Luke Thompson
Alrix Da Costa	9	HK	9	Brad O'Neill
Julian Bousquet	10	PF	10	Matty Lees
Mickael Goudemand	11	SR	11	Ben Currie
Paul Seguier	12	SR	12	Matty Nicholson
Benjamin Garcia	13	LF	13	Elliot Minchella
Ugo Tison	14	IN	14	Mikey Lewis
Tiaki Chan	15	IN	15	James Harrison
Justin Sangare	16	IN	16	Tyler Dupree
Franck Maria	17	IN	17	Oliver Wilson
Laurent Frayssinous		Coach		Andy Last (Note: England Assistant Coach Andy Last took charge of the game as Head Coach Shaun Wane was recovering from an ankle operation.)

Both matches part of a triple-header with the Championship match between Toulouse Olympique and Featherstone Rovers. The match was criticised for poor attendance, poor production, lack of advertisement before the game, lack of coverage, and being curtain raiser to a second tier club match.

== September ==
=== Netherlands men v Scotland ===
14 September 2024
14:00 CEST (UTC+02:00)

Netherlands	34–26	Scotland
Tries: Koolstra (2), Kuijpers, Donnelly (2), Van Der Reek; Goals: Koolstra (5/6)	report	Tries: Brown, Duncan, Hall, Cairney, Arthur; Goals: Punton (3/5)

RC Bassets, Sassenheim
Referee: Louis Moreau-Réfat (France)

Team details
Netherlands		Position	Scotland
Name	Number	Position	Number	Name
Arie-Tjerk Razoux Schultz	1	FB	1	Stephen Paton
Dimitri Harringa	2	WG	2	Lee Cairney
Hidde Van Der Berg	3	CE	3	Craig Wishart
Maas Van Der Reek	4	CE	4	Cameron Moir
Mike Prins	5	WG	5	Andrew Brown
Maurits Thomson	6	SO	6	Luke Punton
Damon Koolstra	7	SH	7	Rory Hamilton
Kevin Ebing	8	PR	8	Terry Logan
James Adams	9	HK	9	Jordan Duncan
Tom Turnock	10	PF	10	Michael Mair
Kees Kuijpers	11	SR	11	Ben Morris
Mavi Geevers	12	SR	12	Gregor Cowan
Paul Kuijpers	13	LF	13	Niall Hall
Mitch Donnelly	14	IN	14	John McMillan
Tom Van Bokhoven	15	IN	15	Jamie Banks
Bonne Wilce	16	IN	16	Duncan Arthur
Edson Neves	17	IN	17	Peter Burns
Dave Hunter		Coach		Adam Houston

=== 2026 Women's World Cup, Middle East-Africa qualifying ===
19 September 2024
16:00 EAT (UTC+03:00)

Kenya	14–22	Nigeria
Tries: Amazimbi, Negesia (2); Goals: Ochieng (1/3)	report	Tries: Aladegelu, Ukwuoma, Iliya (2); Goals: Aladegelu (3/4)

National Youth Centre Organisation, Nairobi
Referee: Stephane Vincent (France)

Team details
Kenya		Position	Nigeria
Name	Number	Position	Number	Name
Lawnisky Munayi	1	FB	1	Blessing Aladegelu
Moreen Atieno	2	WG	2	Blessing Umude
Lovinah Mijere	3	CE	3	Endurance Ukwuoma
Lewin Amazimbi	4	CE	4	Lauretta Bayere
Merisha Negesia	5	WG	5	Perpetua Nwanya
Diana Omosso	6	SO	6	Rukayat Akinade
Ann Ochieng	7	SH	7	Adaeze Innocent
Mercy Khatenje	8	PR	8	Shukurat Nojimu
Milkah Chitechi	9	HK	9	Rukayat Jimoh
Dorris Kimani	10	PF	10	Chinaza Abbah
Sophye Nabwire	11	SR	11	Muinat Oseni
Kerina Omala	12	SR	12	Abiola Obazuaye
Angel Salamba	13	LF	13	Rachel Iliya
Vivian Anyango	14	IN	14	Becky Okitikpe
Susan Wangechi	15	IN	15	Success Iyoha
Sharon Bosibori	16	IN	16	Elizabeth Adie
Faith Oketch	17	IN	17	Adaolisa Onyedikachi
Antonio Lombardo		Coach		Bolu Fagborun

22 September 2024
16:00 EAT (UTC+03:00)

Kenya	8–0	Nigeria
Tries: Negesia; Goals: Omosso (1/4); Drop goals: Omosso (2)	report

Impala Club Rugby Ground, Nairobi
Referee: Stephane Vincent (France)

Team details
Kenya		Position	Nigeria
Name	Number	Position	Number	Name
Milkah Chitechi	1	FB	1	Blessing Umude
Merisha Negesia	2	WG	2	Becky Okitikpe
Susan Wangechi	3	CE	3	Lauretta Bayere
Lewin Amazimbi	4	CE	4	Success Iyoha
Lawnisky Munayi	5	WG	5	Endurance Ukwuoma
Moreen Atieno	6	SO	6	Blessing Aladegelu
Diana Omosso	7	SH	7	Adaeze Innocent
Angel Salamba	8	PR	8	Shukurat Nojimu
Faith Oketch	9	HK	9	Rukayat Jimoh
Dorris Kimani	10	PF	10	Chinaza Abbah
Kerina Omala	11	SR	11	Oseni Muinat
Dorothy Mulela	12	SR	12	Abiola Obazuaye
Lovinah Mijere	13	LF	13	Rachel Iliya
Vivian Anyango	14	IN	14	Rukayat Akinade
Sharon Bosibori	15	IN	15	Perpetua Nwanna
Sophye Nabwire	16	IN	16	Elizabeth Adie
Hesslah Khisa	17	IN	17	Adaolisa Onyedikachi
Antonio Lombardo		Coach		Bolu Fagborun

Nigeria qualified for the 2025 World Series.

=== Netherlands men v Ireland ===
21 September 2024
14:00 CEST (UTC+02:00)

Netherlands	28–30	Ireland
Tries: Geevers, Van Bokhoven (2), Koolstra (2); Goals: Koolstra (4/5)	report	Tries: O'Callaghan (2), Quinn, Cahill, Ashurst; Goals: Farrar (5/5)

Zaandijk RC, Zaandam
Referee: Pierre Loman Chevalier (France)

Team details
Netherlands		Position	Ireland
Name	Number	Position	Number	Name
Mitch Donnelly	1	FB	1	Oliver Whitford
Sandile Khumalo	2	WG	2	Stephen Cahill
Hidde Van Der Berg	3	CE	3	Ellis Keppel
Maas Van Der Reek	4	CE	4	Jake Parks
Dimitri Harringa	5	WG	5	Liam Coyne
Pieter Kluvers	6	SO	6	James Farrar
Damon Koolstra	7	SH	7	Tom Ashurst
Tom Turnock	8	PR	8	Jamie Gill
James Adams	9	HK	9	Liam O'Callaghan
Kevin Ebing	10	PF	10	Samuel Winney
Mavi Geevers	11	SR	11	Conlan Mawson
Paul Kuijpers	12	SR	12	Adam Quinn
Tom Van Bokhoven	13	LF	13	Ryan Hogg
Luke Van Bokhoven	14	IN	14	Jake Connell
Bonne Wilce	15	IN	15	Patrick Stapleton
Daniel de Ruiter	16	IN	16	Jo McConnell
Kees Kuijpers	17	IN	17	Euan Haynes
Dave Hunter		Coach		Wayne Kerr

=== Germany men v Poland ===
Augustus the Strong trophy

21 September 2024
14:00 CEST (UTC+02:00)

Poland	18–58	Germany
Tries: Wisniewskii, Kowalewski, Kłosiński; Goals: Archer (1/1), Krupa (2/2)	report	Tries: Tormann, Kramer, Miles (4), Kurz (4), Kaehler; Goals: Rau (7/11)

Nowe Skalmierzyce
Referee: Misa Vakadranu (Fiji)

Team details
Poland		Position	Germany
Name	Number	Position	Number	Name
Fabian Glinkowski	1	FB	1	Benedikt Esser
Robert Koza	2	WG	2	Florian Kaehler
Domink Medecki	3	CE	3	Linus Kurz
Kamil Kleszcz	4	CE	4	Felix Rau
Mateusz Scherautz	5	WG	5	Fabian Kramer
Łukasz Łucka	6	SO	6	Alex Nyahoe
Szymon Krupa	7	SH	7	Harry Miles
Mateusz Dziąg	8	PR	8	Jakub Zwankski
Mateusz Kowalewski	9	HK	9	Logan Mokalei
Maciej Myszkowski	10	PF	10	Martin Apostel
Stef Archer	11	SR	11	Aaron Wilmott
Jonathan Tutak	12	SR	12	Martin Tormann
Eryk Wisniewskii	13	LF	13	Liam Doughton
Mateusz Kłosiński	14	IN	14	Fabian Wikander
Kamil Owoc	15	IN	15	Malte Brekwoldt
Mateusz Luckzak	16	IN	16	Korbinian Mayer
Łukasz Kostecki	17	IN	17	Henrik Hanswillemenke
Dean Reacher		Coach		Bob Doughton

=== Italy men v Malta ===
Medieval Shield

28 September 2024
15:00 CEST (UTC+02:00)

Italy	0–42	Malta
	report	Tries: Jewitt (2), Gatt (2), Cassar (2), Gauci, Galea; Goals: Gauci (4/7), Galea (1/1)

A.S.D. Juvenilia, Bagnaria Arsa
Referee: Ciprian Gajulete (Italy)

Team details
Italy		Position	Malta
Name	Number	Position	Number	Name
Samule Bertolini	1	FB	1	Zarrin Galea
Lorenzo Sosta	2	WG	2	Harrison Jewitt
Emiliano Buraschi	3	CE	3	Alfie Jewitt
Omar Lai	4	CE	4	Jon Micaleff
Francesco Vallone	5	WG	5	Kyle Gauci
Simone Boscolo	6	SO	6	Josh Gatt
Alessandro Corte	7	SH	7	Karl Cassar
Liam Signorini	8	PR	8	Jean-Pierre Zarb
Ippolito Occhialini	9	HK	9	Robin Cutajar
Davide Colla	10	PF	10	Josh Cassar
Giona Toffoletti	11	SR	11	Justin Davenport
Francesco Speggiorn	12	SR	12	Zac Vella
Mattia Saoncella	13	LF	13	Kaine Dimech
Marco Forno	14	IN	14	Shaun Chircop
Nicola Gannato	15	IN	15	William Watts
Stefano Godoleshi	16	IN	16	Nicky Maylor
Giacomo Civino	17	IN	17	Dean Zammit
Leo Epifania		Coach		Philip Humphrey

=== Serbia men v Netherlands ===
28 September 2024
16:00 CEST (UTC+02:00)

Serbia	6–52	Netherlands
Tries: S. Stojilkovic; Goals: Jasari (1/1)	report	Tries: Van Bokhoven, Harringa, Geevers, Prins (2), Donnelly, Razoux Schultz, Van Der Berg Ebing; Goals: Harringa (3/3), Thomson (5/6)

FC Masinac, Niš
Referee: Enzo Peyre (France)

Team details
Serbia		Position	Netherlands
Name	Number	Position	Number	Name
Andrej Mora	1	FB	1	Mitch Donnelly
Rajko Trifunovic	2	WG	2	Dimitri Harringa
Aleksandar Pavlovic	3	CE	3	Hidde Van Der Berg
Denis Cengaj	4	CE	4	Maas Van Der Reek
Andrej Marinkovic	5	WG	5	Mike Prins
Dzavid Jasari	6	SO	6	Maurits Thomson
Vojislav Dedic	7	SH	7	Pieter Kluvers
Milos Calic	8	PR	8	Tom Van Bokhoven
Vuk Štrbac	9	HK	9	James Adams
Marko Jankovic	10	PF	10	Kevin Ebing
Stefan Arsic	11	SR	11	Mavi Geevers
Nikola Djuric	12	SR	12	Luke Van Bokhoven
Enis Bib	13	LF	13	Paul Kuijpers
Aleksandar Stojanovic	14	IN	14	Arie-Tjerk Razoux Schultz
Djordje Krnjeta	15	IN	15	Tom Turnock
Strahinja Stojilkovic	16	IN	16	Daniel de Ruiter
Luka Ilic	17	IN	17	Bonne Wilce
Darren Fisher		Coach		Dave Hunter

== October ==
=== France men v Lebanon ===
A two-match tour to France by Lebanon was announced in early September 2024 with two tests to be played in Pamiers and Albi on 13 and 19 October respectively. The test series was cancelled five days later. The French Rugby League Federation initially stated that the series had been cancelled due to the NRL not released any Lebanese players. However the International Rugby League later denied this saying the cancellation was due to three key players in the Lebanon team being injured and organisers being concerned about ticket sales with star players absent.

=== Japan men v Hong Kong ===
13 October 2024
14:30 JST (UTC+09:00)

Japan	24–14	Hong Kong
Tries: Kobayashi, Fukushige, S.Takahashi, Drury, Carless; Goals: Yoshitomi 2	Report	Tries: Wong, Lee, Chiu; Goals: Webster

Hiroo Community Green Park, Hiroo, Hokkaido
Attendance: 400
Referee: Geoff Yorston

Team details
Japan		Position	Hong Kong
Name	Number	Position	Number	Name
Travis Drury	1	FB	1	Tommy Wong
Keita Iwanabe	2	WG	2	Dan Chui
Alistair Carless	3	CE	3	Callum Man
Ryota Okui	4	CE	4	Will Webster
Shun Takahashi	5	WG	5	Nelson Chan
Kohei Yoshitomi	6	FE	6	Au Chi Wai
Rex Kobayashi	7	HB	7	Gus Spence
Chris Takuji Lai	8	PR	8	Matthew Jones
Kazuki Fukushige	9	HK	9	Andrew Welling
Taro Miyao	10	PF	10	Blake Atherton
Kazuki Otake	11	SR	11	Jason Yip
Kei Takahashi	12	SR	12	Tommy Lee
Seiya Kakuta	13	LK	13	Douglas O'Donnell
Hiroshi Fukusawa	14	IN	14	Kenta Brown
Sean Hasegawa	15	IN	15	Toby Lei
Gorka Gerediaga Etxaburu	16	IN	16	Conan Freeman
Lachlan Grieve	17	IN	17	Michael Chiu

=== Wales men v Jamaica ===
15 October 2024
19:30 BST (UTC+01:00)

Wales	22–16	Jamaica
Tries: Williams, Worthington, Clarke, Dudson, Fozard; Goals: Fozard (1/5)	report	Tries: Jones Bishop, Young, Joshua Hudson-Lett; Goals: Rush (1/3), Carter (1/1)

The Gnoll, Neath
Attendance: 1,299
Referee: Marcus Griffiths (England)

Team details
Greece		Position	Ireland
Name	Number	Position	Number	Name
Billy Walkley	1	FB	1	Ben Jones Bishop
Mike Butt	2	WG	2	Alex Young
Luis Roberts	3	CE	3	Darius Carter
Will Evans	4	CE	4	Chris Ball
Rhys Williams	5	WG	5	Mo Agoro
Elliot Kear	6	SO	6	James Woodburn-Hall
Matty Fozard	7	SH	7	Kieran Rush
Gil Dudson	8	PR	8	Delaine Bedward-Gittens
Finley Yates	9	HK	9	Keenan Tomlinson
Ben Evans	10	PF	10	Jordan Andrade
Connor Davies	11	SR	11	Jaden Dayes
Bailey Antrobus	12	SR	12	Aaron Small
Sam Bowring	13	LF	13	Keenan Ramsden
Huw Worthington	14	IN	14	Isaac Coleman
Max Clarke	15	IN	15	Joshua Hudson-Lett
Anthony Walker	16	IN	16	Leo Kerrett-Evans
Ashton Robinson	17	IN	17	Joe Brown
Joe Coope-Franklin	18	RES	18	Jy-Mel Coleman
John Kear		Coach		Rhys Lovegrove

=== 2024 Pacific Championships ===
==== Group stage ====
18 October 2024
19:10 AEST (UTC+10:00)

Australia	18–0	Tonga
Tries: 3 Trbojevic 12'; Tabuai-Fidow 51'; Dearden 78'; Goals: 3 Lomax 3/4 13', 53', pen 58'	1st: 6–0; 2nd: 12–0; Report	Tries: 0 Goals: 0

Lang Park, Brisbane
Attendance: 33,196
Referee: Gerard Sutton (Australia)
Senior review official: Ashley Klein (Australia)
Touch judges: Drew Oultram (Australia), Michael Wise (Australia)
Player of the Match: Hamiso Tabuai-Fidow (Australia)

Team details
Australia		Position	Tonga
Name	Number	Position	Number	Name
Dylan Edwards	1	FB	1	Lehi Hopoate
Xavier Coates	2	WG	2	Daniel Tupou
Hamiso Tabuai-Fidow	3	CE	3	Moses Suli
Tom Trbojevic	4	CE	4	Paul Alamoti
Zac Lomax	5	WG	5	Sione Katoa
Tom Dearden	6	SO/FE	6	Tuimoala Lolohea
Mitchell Moses	7	SH/HB	7	Isaiya Katoa
Patrick Carrigan	8	PR	8	Addin Fonua-Blake (c)
Harry Grant	9	HK	9	Siliva Havili
Lindsay Collins	10	PF	10	Felise Kaufusi
Angus Crichton	11	SR	11	Haumole Olakau'atu
Cameron Murray	12	SR	12	Eliesa Katoa
Isaah Yeo (c)	13	LF/LK	13	Jason Taumalolo (c)
Matt Burton	14	IN	14	Soni Luke
Mitchell Barnett	15	IN	15	Sitili Tupouniua
Reuben Cotter	16	IN	16	Taniela Paseka
Hudson Young	17	IN	17	Keaon Koloamatangi
Ben Hunt	18	RES	18	Toluta'u Koula
Mal Meninga		Coach		Kristian Woolf

27 October 2024
18:05 NZDT (UTC+13:00)

New Zealand	10–22	Australia
Tries: 2 Isaako 25'; Warbrick 64'; Goals: 1 Isaako 1/2 27'	1st: 6–12; 2nd: 4–10; Report	Tries: 4 Collins 15'; Lomax 35', 58'; Moses 71'; Goals: 3 Lomax 3/5 15', pen 39', 73'

Rugby League Park, Christchurch
Attendance: 17,005
Referee: Ashley Klein (Australia)
Senior review official: Gerard Sutton (Australia)
Touch judges: Phil Henderson (Australia), Chris Sutton (Australia)
Player of the Match: Harry Grant (Australia)

Team details
New Zealand		Position	Australia
Name	Number	Position	Number	Name
Keano Kini	1	FB	1	Dylan Edwards
Jamayne Isaako	2	WG	2	Xavier Coates
Matthew Timoko	3	CE	3	Hamiso Tabuai-Fidow
Peta Hiku	4	CE	4	Tom Trbojevic
William Warbrick	5	WG	5	Zac Lomax
Charnze Nicoll-Klokstad	6	SO/FE	6	Tom Dearden
Shaun Johnson	7	SH/HB	7	Mitchell Moses
James Fisher-Harris (c)	8	PR	8	Patrick Carrigan
Phoenix Crossland	9	HK	9	Harry Grant
Naufahu Whyte	10	PF	10	Lindsay Collins
Isaiah Papali'i	11	SR	11	Angus Crichton
Scott Sorensen	12	SR	12	Cameron Murray
Joseph Tapine	13	LF/LK	13	Isaah Yeo (c)
Griffin Neame	14	IN	14	Matt Burton
Kodi Nikorima	15	IN	15	Mitchell Barnett
Marata Niukore	16	IN	16	Reuben Cotter
Jordan Riki	17	IN	17	Hudson Young
Erin Clark	18	RES	18	Ben Hunt
Stacey Jones		Coach		Mal Meninga

2 November 2024
20:05 NZDT (UTC+13:00)

New Zealand	24–25	Tonga
Tries: 4 Papali'i 35'; Kini 50'; Crossland 58'; Tapine 66'; Goals: 4 Isaako 4/5 36', 51', 59', 67'; Field goals: 0 Johnson 0/1; Isaako 0/1	1st: 6–24; 2nd: 18–1; Report	Tries: 4 S. Katoa 2'; Fonua-Blake 22'; Havili 26'; Luke 32'; Goals: 4 I. Katoa 4/5 4', pen 12', 23', 33'; Field goals: 1 I. Katoa 1/1 75'

Mount Smart Stadium, Auckland
Attendance: 22,363
Referee: Todd Smith (Australia)
Senior review official: Wyatt Raymond (Australia)
Touch judges: Dave Munro (Australia)

Team details
New Zealand		Position	Tonga
Name	Number	Position	Number	Name
Keano Kini	1	FB	1	Lehi Hopoate
Jamayne Isaako	2	WG	2	Daniel Tupou
Matthew Timoko	3	CE	3	Moses Suli
Peta Hiku	4	CE	4	Paul Alamoti
William Warbrick	5	WG	5	Sione Katoa
Charnze Nicoll-Klokstad	6	SO/FE	6	Tuimoala Lolohea
Shaun Johnson	7	SH/HB	7	Isaiya Katoa
James Fisher-Harris (c)	8	PR	8	Addin Fonua-Blake (c)
Phoenix Crossland	9	HK	9	Siliva Havili
Joseph Tapine	10	PF	10	Felise Kaufusi
Isaiah Papali'i	11	SR	11	Haumole Olakau'atu
Scott Sorensen	12	SR	12	Eliesa Katoa
Leo Thompson	17	LF/LK	13	Jason Taumalolo (c)
Naufahu Whyte	13	IN	14	Soni Luke
Kodi Nikorima	14	IN	15	Sitili Tupouniua
Griffin Neame	15	IN	16	Taniela Paseka
Marata Niukore	16	IN	17	Siua Wong
Erin Clark	18	RES	18	Toluta'u Koula
Stacey Jones		Coach		Kristian Woolf

==== Men's final ====
10 November 2024
16:05 AEDT (UTC+11:00)

Australia	20–14	Tonga
Tries: 4 Tabuai-Fidow 15'; Coates 25'; Trbojevic 35', 42'; Goals: 2 Lomax 2/4 37', 44'	1st: 14–4; 2nd: 6–10; Report	Tries: 3 S. Katoa 6'; Olakau'atu 57'; E. Katoa 73'; Goals: 1 I. Katoa 1/3 58'

Western Sydney Stadium, Sydney
Attendance: 28,728
Referee: Ashley Klein (Australia)
Senior review official: Liam Kennedy (Australia)
Touch judges: Drew Oultram (Australia), Michael Wise (Australia)
Player of the Match: Tom Dearden (Australia)

Team details
Australia		Position	Tonga
Name	Number	Position	Number	Name
Dylan Edwards	1	FB	1	Lehi Hopoate
Xavier Coates	2	WG	2	Daniel Tupou
Hamiso Tabuai-Fidow	3	CE	18	Toluta'u Koula
Tom Trbojevic	4	CE	4	Paul Alamoti
Zac Lomax	5	WG	5	Sione Katoa
Tom Dearden	6	SO/FE	6	Tuimoala Lolohea
Mitchell Moses	7	SH/HB	7	Isaiya Katoa
Patrick Carrigan	8	PR	8	Addin Fonua-Blake (c)
Harry Grant	9	HK	9	Siliva Havili
Lindsay Collins	10	PF	10	Felise Kaufusi
Angus Crichton	11	SR	11	Haumole Olakau'atu
Hudson Young	12	SR	12	Eliesa Katoa
Isaah Yeo (c)	13	LF/LK	13	Jason Taumalolo (c)
Matt Burton	14	IN	14	Soni Luke
Mitchell Barnett	15	IN	16	Taniela Paseka
Reuben Cotter	16	IN	17	Siua Wong
Lindsay Smith	17	IN	19	Keaon Koloamatangi
Ben Hunt	18	RES	15	Sitili Tupouniua
Mal Meninga		Coach		Kristian Woolf

==== Men's Pacific Bowl ====
19 October 2024
20:10 FJT (UTC+12:00)

Fiji	10–22	Papua New Guinea
Tries: 2 Valemei 47'; Sivo 79'; Goals: 1 Milne 1/2 79'	1st: 0–16; 2nd: 10–6; Report	Tries: 4 Derby 17'; Rimbu 24'; Namo 36'; Macdonald 51'; Goals: 3 Martin 3/4 26', 38', 53'

National Stadium, Suva
Attendance: 7,581
Referee: Wyatt Raymond (Australia)
Senior review official: Liam Kennedy (Australia)
Touch judges: Phil Henderson (Australia), Jon Stone (Australia)

Team details
Fiji		Position	Papua New Guinea
Name	Number	Position	Number	Name
Sunia Turuva	1	FB	1	Nene Macdonald
Maika Sivo	2	WG	2	Elijah Roltinga
Michael Jennings	3	CE	3	Robert Mathias
Waqa Blake	4	CE	4	Rodrick Tai
Semi Valemei	5	WG	5	Robert Derby
Kevin Naiqama	6	SO/FE	6	Kyle Laybutt (c)
Kurt Donoghoe	7	SH/HB	7	Lachlan Lam
Tui Kamikamica (c)	8	PR	8	Valentine Richard
Penioni Tagituimua	9	HK	14	Liam Horne
Ben Nakubuwai	10	PF	10	Jacob Alick-Wiencke
Viliame Kikau	11	SR	11	Rhyse Martin
Taane Milne	15	SR	12	Jeremiah Simbiken
Caleb Navale	13	LF/LK	13	Jack de Belin
Kitione Kautoga	12	IN	9	Judah Rimbu
Joe Lovodua	14	IN	15	Koso Bandi
Jordan Miller	17	IN	22	Ila Alu
Nathan Kegg-Smith	20	IN	23	Sylvester Namo
Kylan Mafoa	16	RES	18	Daniel Russell
Wise Kativerata		Coach		Jason Demetriou

26 October 2024
20:10 FJT (UTC+12:00)

Fiji	56–6	Cook Islands
Tries: 10; Jennings 19', 27', 60'; Valemei 51', 74'; Sivo 69', 71'; Turuva 14'; Kautoga 34'; Nakubuwai 65'; Goals: 8 Milne 7/7 16', 20', 29', 36', 53', 70', 73'; Naiqama 1/2 66'; Valevatu 0/1	1st: 24–6; 2nd: 32–0; Report	Tries: 1 Ngatikaura 10'; Goals: 1 S. Marsters 1/1 12'

National Stadium, Suva
Attendance: 5,943
Referee: Chris Butler (Australia)
Senior review official: Wyatt Raymond (Australia)
Touch judges: Dave Munro (Australia)

Team details
Fiji		Position	Cook Islands
Name	Number	Position	Number	Name
Sunia Turuva	1	FB	1	Esom Ioka
Maika Sivo	2	WG	2	Steven Marsters
Michael Jennings	3	CE	3	Reubenn Rennie
Waqa Blake	4	CE	4	Delahia Wigmore
Semi Valemei	5	WG	5	Rixson Andrew
Kevin Naiqama	6	SO/FE	6	Brad Takairangi (c)
Kurt Donoghoe	7	SH/HB	7	Esan Marsters
Tui Kamikamica (c)	8	PR	8	Tepai Moeroa
James Valevatu	9	HK	9	Ruatapu Ngatikaura
Ben Nakubuwai	10	PF	10	Davvy Moale
Viliame Kikau	11	SR	11	Zane Tetevano
Taane Milne	12	SR	12	Reuben Porter
Caleb Navale	13	LF/LK	13	Pride Petterson-Robati
Penioni Tagituimua	14	IN	14	Kobe Tararo
Kitione Kautoga	15	IN	15	Mason Teague
Kylan Mafoa	16	IN	17	Justin Makirere
Jordan Miller	17	IN	18	Junior Teroi
Ratu Rinakama	18	RES	16	Rhys Dakin
Wise Kativerata		Coach		Karmichael Hunt

3 November 2024
15:00 PNGST (UTC+10:00)

Papua New Guinea	42–20	Cook Islands
Tries: 8 Roltinga 5', 49'; Macdonald 31', 57'; Lam 35'; Derby 42'; Namo 46'; Morea 79'; Goals: 5 Laybutt 5/8 32', 36', 44', 47', 50'	1st: 16–14; 2nd: 26–6; Report	Tries: 3 Moale 8'; S. Masters 27'; Ioka 71'; Goals: 4 S. Masters 4/4 10', pen 17', 29', 72'

PNG Football Stadium, Port Moresby
Attendance: TBA
Referee: Peter Gough (Australia)
Senior review official: Chris Butler (Australia)
Touch judges: Phil Henderson (Australia),

Team details
Papua New Guinea		Position	Cook Islands
Name	Number	Position	Number	Name
Nene Macdonald	1	FB	7	Esan Marsters
Elijah Roltinga	2	WG	1	Esom Ioka
Robert Mathias	3	CE	3	Reubenn Rennie
Rodrick Tai	4	CE	4	Delahia Wigmore
Robert Derby	5	WG	2	Steven Marsters
Kyle Laybutt (c)	6	SO/FE	6	Brad Takairangi (c)
Lachlan Lam	7	SH/HB	15	Mason Teague
Jacob Alick-Wiencke	10	PR	8	Tepai Moeroa
Judah Rimbu	9	HK	9	Ruatapu Ngatikaura
Ila Alu	17	PF	10	Davvy Moale
Daniel Russell	11	SR	12	Reuben Porter
Jeremiah Simbiken	12	SR	13	Pride Petterson-Robati
Jack de Belin	13	LF/LK	11	Zane Tetevano
Valentine Richard	8	IN	14	Kobe Tararo
Liam Horne	14	IN	16	Rhys Dakin
Koso Bandi	15	IN	18	Junior Teroi
Sylvester Namo	16	IN	20	Makahesi Makatoa
Morea Morea	19	RES	17	Justin Makirere
Jason Demetriou		Coach		Karmichael Hunt

==== Men's promotion/relegation playoff ====
10 November 2024
18:20 AEDT (UTC+11:00)

New Zealand	54–12	Papua New Guinea
Tries: 10; McLean 4', 44', 56', 60'; Isaako 11', 69', 74'; Thompson 37'; Nicoll-Klokstad 40'; Whyte 72'; Goals: 7 Isaako (7/10) 5', 39', 40', 45', 62', 71', 74'	1st: 22–6; 2nd: 32–6; Report	Tries: 2 Namo 20'; Derby 64'; Goals: 2 Rhyse Martin (2/2) 22', 65'

Western Sydney Stadium, Sydney
Attendance: TBA
Referee: Gerard Sutton (Australia)
Senior review official: Chris Butler (Australia)
Touch judges: Dave Munro (Australia), Chris Sutton (Australia)

Team details
New Zealand		Position	Papua New Guinea
Name	Number	Position	Number	Name
Keano Kini	1	FB	1	Nene Macdonald
Jamayne Isaako	2	WG	2	Elijah Roltinga
Matthew Timoko	3	CE	3	Robert Mathias
Peta Hiku	4	CE	4	Rodrick Tai
Casey McLean	20	WG	5	Robert Derby
Charnze Nicoll-Klokstad	6	SO/FE	6	Kyle Laybutt (c)
Shaun Johnson	7	SH/HB	7	Lachlan Lam
James Fisher-Harris (c)	8	PR	8	Valentine Richard
Phoenix Crossland	9	HK	9	Liam Horne
Joseph Tapine	10	PF	10	Jacob Alick-Wiencke
Isaiah Papali'i	11	SR	11	Rhyse Martin
Scott Sorensen	12	SR	12	Jeremiah Simbiken
Naufahu Whyte	13	LF/LK	13	Jack de Belin
Kodi Nikorima	14	IN	14	Judah Rimbu
Griffin Neame	15	IN	15	Koso Bandi
Leo Thompson	17	IN	16	Sylvester Namo
Erin Clark	18	IN	17	Ila Alu
Marata Niukore	16	RES	18	Daniel Russell
Stacey Jones		Coach		Jason Demetriou

==== Women's Pacific Cup ====
NB: All matches played to Australia's 70 minute rule for women's rugby league.

==== Group stage ====
18 October 2024
17:05 AEST (UTC+10:00)

Australia	84–0	Papua New Guinea
Tries: 17; Upton 7', 39'; Robinson 15', 18', 27', 36', 52', 62'; Whitfeld 24', 29', 33', 50', 55'; Penitani 43'; Kelly 47', 69'; Sergis 68'; Goals: 8 Aiken 8/16 9', 17', 28', 30', 40', 48', 63', 69'; Taufa 0/1	1st: 36–0; 2nd: 48–0; Report	Tries: 0 Goals: 0

Lang Park, Brisbane
Attendance: 18,486
Referee: Belinda Sharpe (Australia)
Senior Review Official: Peter Gough (Australia)
Touch judges: Daniel Schwass (Australia), Dave Munro (Australia)

Team details
Australia		Position	Papua New Guinea
Name	Number	Position	Number	Name
Tamika Upton	1	FB	1	Mala Mark
Julia Robinson	2	WG	2	Freda Waula
Isabelle Kelly	3	CE	3	Belinda Gwasamun
Jessica Sergis	18	CE	4	La-Toniya Norris-Addo
Jakiya Whitfeld	5	WG	5	Lyiannah Allen
Tiana Penitani	4	SO/FE	6	Sera Koroi
Tarryn Aiken	7	SH/HB	7	Delailah Ahose
Millie Elliott	8	PR	8	Essay Banu
Quincy Dodd	9	HK	9	Ua Ravu
Shannon Mato	10	PF	10	Elsie Albert (c)
Kezie Apps (c)	11	SR	11	Sareka Mooka
Yasmin Clydsdale	12	SR	12	Emily Veivers
Simaima Taufa	13	LF/LK	13	Gloria Kaupa
Olivia Higgins	14	IN	14	Roswita Kapo
Sarah Togatuki	15	IN	15	Jessikah Reeves
Keilee Joseph	16	IN	16	Talitha Kunjil
Mahalia Murphy	17	IN	17	Leila Kerowa
Abbi Church	19	RES	18	Lilah Malabag
Brad Donald		Coach		Tahnee Norris

27 October 2024
15:35 NZDT (UTC+13:00)

New Zealand	0–14	Australia
Tries: 0 Goals: 0	1st: 0–4; 2nd: 0–10; Report	Tries: 3 Penitani 31'; Upton 50'; Sergis 54'; Goals: 1 Aiken 1/3 51'

Rugby League Park, Christchurch
Attendance: 10,289
Referee: Liam Kennedy (Australia)
Senior Review Official: Todd Smith (Australia)
Touch judges: Jon Stone (Australia)

Team details
New Zealand		Position	Australia
Name	Number	Position	Number	Name
Apii Nicholls-Pualau	1	FB	1	Tamika Upton
Leianne Tufuga	2	WG	2	Julia Robinson
Mele Hufanga	3	CE	3	Isabelle Kelly
Abigail Roache	4	CE	4	Tiana Penitani
Shanice Parker	5	WG	5	Jakiya Whitfeld
Gayle Broughton	6	SO/FE	6	Ali Brigginshaw (c)
Tyla King	7	SH/HB	7	Tarryn Aiken
Brianna Clark	8	PR	8	Millie Elliott
Brooke Anderson	9	HK	9	Olivia Higgins
Angelina Teakaraanga-Katoa	10	PF	10	Shannon Mato
Annessa Biddle	11	SR	11	Kezie Apps (c)
Najvada George	15	SR	12	Yasmin Clydsdale
Georgia Hale (c)	13	LF/LK	13	Simaima Taufa
Amber Hall	12	IN	15	Sarah Togatuki
Ashleigh Quinlan	14	IN	16	Keilee Joseph
Alexis Tauaneai	16	IN	17	Mahalia Murphy
Tiana Davison	17	IN	18	Jessica Sergis
Otesa Pule	18	RES	20	Keeley Davis
Ricky Henry		Coach		Brad Donald

3 November 2024
12:55 PNGST (UTC+10:00)

Papua New Guinea	0–36	New Zealand
Tries: 0 Goals: 0	1st: 0–16; 2nd: 0–20; Report	Tries: 7 Tufuga 1', 23'; Teakaraanga-Katoa 26'; Wiki 44', 50', 68'; Quinlan 56'; Goals: 4 King 4/7 24', 27', 45', 57'

PNG Football Stadium, Port Moresby
Referee: Daniel Schwass (Australia)
Senior Review Official: Chris Butler (Australia)
Touch judges: Chris Sutton (Australia)

Team details
Papua New Guinea		Position	New Zealand
Name	Number	Position	Number	Name
Shae Yvonne De La Cruz	1	FB	1	Shanice Parker
Jenny Wesley	4	WG	2	Mackenzie Wiki
Belinda Gwasamun	3	CE	3	Mele Hufanga
Leila Kerowa	11	CE	4	Abigail Roache
Lyiannah Allen	5	WG	5	Leianne Tufuga
Sera Koroi	6	SO/FE	6	Gayle Broughton
Ua Ravu	7	SH/HB	7	Tyla King
Elsie Albert (c)	8	PR	8	Brianna Clark
Therese Aiton	9	HK	9	Brooke Anderson
Essay Banu	10	PF	10	Alexis Tauaneai
Emily Veivers	12	SR	11	Najvada George
Sareka Mooka	13	SR	12	Amber Hall
Gloria Kaupa	16	LF/LK	13	Georgia Hale (c)
Jessikah Reeves	15	IN	14	Ashleigh Quinlan
Yolanda Taute	17	IN	15	Otesa Pule
Lilah Malabag	18	IN	16	Brooke Talataina
Roswita Kapo	19	IN	17	Angelina Teakaraanga-Katoa
Mala Mark	2	RES	18	Cheyelle Robins-Reti
Tahnee Norris		Coach		Ricky Henry

==== Women's final ====
10 November 2024
13:50 AEDT (UTC+11:00)

Australia	24–4	New Zealand
Tries: 5 Robinson 8'; Kelly 15'; Penitani 31'; Upton 42'; Aiken 46'; Goals: 2 Aiken 2/5 44', 47'	1st: 12–0; 2nd: 12–4; Report	Tries: 1 Tufuga 68'; Goals: 0

Western Sydney Stadium, Sydney
Attendance: 17,503
Referee: Belinda Sharpe (Australia)
Senior Review Official: Peter Gough (Australia)
Touch judges: Phil Henderson (Australia), Jon Stone (Australia)
Player of the Match: Tarryn Aiken (Australia)

Team details
Australia		Position	New Zealand
Name	Number	Position	Number	Name
Tamika Upton	1	FB	1	Apii Nicholls-Pualau
Julia Robinson	2	WG	2	Leianne Tufuga
Isabelle Kelly	3	CE	3	Mele Hufanga
Tiana Penitani	4	CE	4	Abigail Roache
Jakiya Whitfeld	5	WG	5	Shanice Parker
Ali Brigginshaw (c)	6	SO/FE	6	Gayle Broughton
Tarryn Aiken	7	SH/HB	7	Tyla King
Millie Elliott	8	PR	8	Brianna Clark
Olivia Higgins	9	HK	9	Brooke Anderson
Shannon Mato	10	PF	16	Alexis Tauaneai
Kezie Apps (c)	11	SR	11	Annessa Biddle
Yasmin Clydsdale	12	SR	12	Amber Hall
Simaima Taufa	13	LF/LK	13	Georgia Hale (c)
Keeley Davis	14	IN	10	Angelina Teakaraanga-Katoa
Sarah Togatuki	15	IN	14	Ashleigh Quinlan
Keilee Joseph	16	IN	15	Najvada George
Jessica Sergis	18	IN	17	Otesa Pule
Jessika Elliston	19	RES	18	Tiana Davison
Brad Donald		Coach		Ricky Henry

==== Women's Pacific Bowl ====
NB: All matches played to Australia's 70 minute rule for women's rugby league.

==== Semi-finals ====
19 October 2024
18:00 FJT (UTC+12:00)

Tonga	16–30	Samoa
Tries: 3 Hanisi 21'; Takapautolo 34'; Tauhalaliku 41'; Goals: 2 Paki 2/3 23', 42'	1st: 10–20; 2nd: 6–10; Report	Tries: 5 Masaga 1', 31'; Lofipo 9'; Patea 28', 54'; Tui 65'; Goals: 3 Piliae-Rasabale 3/6 7 pen', 11', 56'

National Stadium, Suva
Attendance: 3,271
Referee: Todd Smith (Australia)
Senior Review Official: Chris Butler (Australia)
Touch judges: Chris Sutton (Australia)

Team details
Tonga		Position	Samoa
Name	Number	Position	Number	Name
Anaseini Malupo	1	FB	1	Evania Pelite
Maatuleio Fotu-Moala	2	WG	2	Mercedez Taulelei-Siala
Litia Fusi	3	CE	3	Lindsay Tui
Kate Fallon	4	CE	4	Sarina Masaga
Lavinia Tauhalaliku	5	WG	5	Jessica Patea
Emmanita Paki	6	SO/FE	6	Tavarna Papalii
Cassey Tohi-Hiku	7	SH/HB	7	Pauline Piliae-Rasabale
Kalosipani Hopoate	8	PR	8	Annetta Nu'uausala (c)
Jade Fonua	9	HK	9	Destiny Brill
Tegan Dymock	10	PF	10	Laikha Clarke
Manilita Takapautolo	11	SR	11	Monalisa Soliola
Vanessa Foliaki (c)	12	SR	12	Christian Pio
Natasha Penitani	13	LF/LK	13	Sienna Lofipo
Filomina Hanisi	15	IN	14	Jetaya Faifua
Dannii Perese	16	IN	15	Simone Karpani
Paea Uilou	17	IN	17	Pihuka Berryman-Duff
Seli Mailangi	19	IN	18	Evah McEwen
Tatiana Finau	14	RES	16	Jasmine Fogavini
Kelvin Wright		Coach		Jamie Soward

26 October 2024
18:00 FJT (UTC+12:00)

Fiji	18–6	Cook Islands
Tries: 4 Naikore 21', 39', 60'; Holmes 17'; Goals: 1 Naikore 18'; Naitokatoka 0/1; Lutu 0/1	1st: 10–6; 2nd: 8–0; Report	Tries: 1 Matua 9'; Goals: 1 Poko 1/1 10'

National Stadium, Suva
Attendance: 3,216
Referee: Peter Gough (Australia)
Senior Review Official: Wyatt Raymond (Australia)
Touch judges: Drew Oultram (Australia)

Team details
Fiji		Position	Cook Islands
Name	Number	Position	Number	Name
Cassie Staples	1	FB	1	Kiana Takairangi (c)
Vitalina Naikore	4	WG	2	Chantelle Holloway-Samuels
Sienna Laing	3	CE	3	Tyler Birch
Taina Naividi	6	CE	4	Kaiyah Atai
Abigayle Sekitoga	19	WG	5	Kiarah Siauane
Luisa Yaranamua	17	SO/FE	6	Charntay Poko
Losana Lutu	7	SH/HB	7	Lydia Turua-Quedley
Ilisapeci Bari	2	PR	8	Crystal Tamarua
Sereana Naitokatoka	9	HK	9	Chelsea Makira
Aliti Namoce	15	PF	10	April Ngatupuna
Nanise Vakacavu	11	SR	11	Jazmon Tupou-Witchman
Latisha Smythe	12	SR	12	Kerehitina Matua
Talei Holmes (c)	18	LF/LK	13	Anneka Stephens
Anastasia Shum-Cottrell	14	IN	14	Jodeci Joseph
Mere Kilawekana	20	IN	15	Lavinia Kitai
Ema Rainima	21	IN	18	Tahleisha Maeva
Teaghan Hartigan	25	IN	19	Ryvrr-Lee Alo
Asenaca Diranuve	10	RES	21	Chazmin Holloway-Samuels
Josaia Dakuitoga		Coach		Rusty Matua

==== Final ====
2 November 2024
17:35 NZDT (UTC+13:00)

Samoa	16–12	Fiji
Tries: 3 Patea 18'; Nu'uausala 56', 67'; Goals: 2 Piliae-Rasabale 2/3 57', 69'	1st: 4–12; 2nd: 12–0	Tries: 2 Laing 30'; Sekitoga 35'; Goals: 2 Naikore 2/2 32', 35'

Mount Smart Stadium, Auckland
Attendance: TBA
Referee: Belinda Sharpe (Australia)
Senior Review Official: Liam Kennedy (Australia)
Touch judges: Drew Oultram (Australia)

Team details
Samoa		Position	Fiji
Name	Number	Position	Number	Name
Evania Pelite	1	FB	1	Cassie Staples
Mercedez Taulelei-Siala	2	WG	4	Vitalina Naikore
Lindsay Tui	3	CE	3	Sienna Laing
Sarina Masaga	4	CE	6	Taina Naividi
Jessica Patea	5	WG	19	Abigayle Sekitoga
Tavarna Papalii	6	SO/FE	17	Luisa Yaranamua
Pauline Piliae-Rasabale	7	SH/HB	5	Losana Lutu
Annetta Nu'uausala (c)	8	PR	2	Ilisapeci Bari
Destiny Brill	9	HK	9	Sereana Naitokatoka
Evah McEwen	17	PF	12	Latisha Smythe
Monalisa Soliola	11	SR	11	Nanise Vakacavu
Christian Pio	12	SR	25	Teaghan Hartigan
Sienna Lofipo	13	LF/LK	18	Talei Holmes (c)
Laikha Clarke	10	IN	8	Sereana Maragi
Jetaya Faifua	14	IN	14	Anastasia Shum-Cottrell
Simone Karpani	15	IN	20	Mere Kilawekana
Pihuka Berryman-Duff	16	IN	21	Rory Muller
Jasmine Fogavini	16	RES	15	Ema Rainima
Jamie Soward		Coach		Josaia Dakuitoga

=== Czech men v Ukraine ===
18 October 2024
15:45 CEST (UTC+02:00)

Czech Republic	0–84	Ukraine
	Report	Tries: Ngaronoa (2), Polata (4), Vedler (2), Scorbach (2), Syvokoz (2), Trusov (2), Menchinsky (2); Goals: Scorbach (10/16)

City Stadium, Letohrad
Referee: Misa Vakadranu (Fiji)

Team details
Czech Republic		Position	Ukraine
Name	Number	Position	Number	Name
Jakub Tichy	1	FB	1	Yevhhen Davydov
Václav Vágner	2	WG	2	Tigris Polata
Filip-Daniel Kittl	3	CE	3	Vitali Puchov
Marek Tejchman	4	CE	4	Mykhalio Troian
Oldrich Chrbolka	5	WG	5	Danylo Vedler
Daniel Veselý	6	SO	6	Oleksandr Scorbach
Jakub Hudrlik	7	SH	7	Daniel Jannissen
David Bělohlávek	8	PR	8	Tim Knight
Tomáš Řičica	9	HK	9	Dymytro Seremenko
Jaroslav Novotny	10	PF	10	Oleksandr Syvokoz
Martin Hanc	11	SR	11	Jonah Ngaronoa
Krystof Pecold	12	SR	12	Yevhenii Trusov
Tomas Adamec	13	LF	13	Tom Menchinksy
Jan Zámrský	14	IN	14	Volodymyr Karpenko
Vit Studecky	15	IN	15	Yaroslav Davydov
Jakub Czermak	16	IN	16	Yevhen Checheta
Josef Brynda	17	IN	17	Oleksandr Shcherbyna
Ladislav Cintler		Coach		Dan Beardshaw

=== Canada men v Jamaica ===
19 October 2024
14:00 EDT (UTC-04:00)

Canada	28–6	Jamaica
Tries: Michalik, Carpenter (2), Keegel, Mahovic, Ohlmann; Goals: Bourne (1/1), Park (1/5)	Report	Tries: Green; Goals: Green (1/1)

Lamport Stadium, Toronto
Referee: Kemoy White (Jamaica)

Team details
Canada		Position	Jamaica
Name	Number	Position	Number	Name
Colton Carpenter	1	FB	1	Javian Bryan
Josh Michalik	2	WG	2	Jenson Morris
Adam Timler	3	CE	3	Alpachino Mignott
David Froome	4	CE	4	Jimmy Morgan
Lee Keegel	5	WG	5	Orlando Jones
Blake Mahovic	6	SO	6	Kymani Green
Jacob Bourne	7	SH	7	Marvin Thompson
Ethan Ohlmann	8	PR	8	Tyronie Rowe
Ben Stothers	9	HK	9	Aaron Jones Bishop
Charles Curran	10	PF	10	Tremaine Thompson-Griffiths
Jason Chuck	11	SR	11	Leo Kerrett-Evans
Jason Park	12	SR	12	Joshua Hill
Scyler Dumas	13	LF	13	Lamont Bryan
Kyle Yurkiw	14	IN	14	Michael Pearson
Mitch Talbot	15	IN	15	Ricardo Richards
Daniel Martyn	16	IN	16	Ramorio Bartley
Nathan Roberts	17	IN	17	Adrian Thomas
Aaron Zimmerle		Coach		Ray Calvert

=== Czech men v Poland ===
19 October 2024
16:00 CEST (UTC+02:00)

Czech Republic	34–24	Poland
Tries: Schejbal (2), Brynda, Cintler, Radil, Henzl; Goals: Hudrlik (5/6)	Report	Tries: Wisniewskii, Tutak, Medecki, Kleszcz; Goals: Kowalewski (4/4)

City Stadium, Letohrad
Referee: Misa Vakadranu (Fiji)

Team details
Czech Republic		Position	Ukraine
Name	Number	Position	Number	Name
Jakub Hudrlik	1	FB	1	Mateusz Kowalewski
David Slivka	2	WG	2	Jakub Cichosz
Adam Mikulas	3	CE	3	Kamil Kleszcz
Jakub Czermak	4	CE	4	Domink Medecki
Matej Schejbal	5	WG	5	Sergiusz Kalwinek
Ladislav Cintler	6	SO	6	Lukas Lucka
Josef Brynda	7	SH	7	Kamil Owoc
Jan Zámrský	8	PR	8	Mathusz Dziag
Jakub Skorepa	9	HK	9	Tomasz Zerbe
Kamil Havel	10	PF	10	Łukasz Kostecki
Dominik Radil	11	SR	11	Mateusz Luckzak
Marek Henzl	12	SR	12	Jonathan Tutak
Vit Studecky	13	LF	13	Eryk Wisniewskii
Krystof Henzl	14	IN	14	Patryk Gabryś
Karel Lafant	15	IN	15	Mateusz Wojtas
Marek Tejchman	16	IN	16	Konrad Szymanczak
Václav Vágner	17	IN	17	Michal Karkus-Blada
Ladislav Cintler		Coach		Dean Reacher

=== 2026 Men's World Cup, Europe qualifying ===
==== Semi-finals ====
22 October 2024
17:00 CEST (UTC+02:00)

Serbia	0–48	Wales
	1st: 0–30; 2nd: 0–18; Report	Tries: Fozard, Kear, Walker, Evans, Connor Davies, Butt, Worthington, Coope-Franklin; Goals: Fozard (7/7), Kear (1/1)

Stade Albert Domec, Carcassonne
Attendance: 1,257
Referee: Geoffrey Poumes (France)

Team details
Serbia		Position	Wales
Name	Number	Position	Number	Name
Nikola Cotic	1	FB	1	Billy Walkley
Rajko Trifunovic	2	WG	2	Joe Coope-Franklin
Nick O'Meley	3	CE	3	Mike Butt
David Nofoaluma	4	CE	4	Will Evans
Andrej Mora	5	WG	5	Rhys Williams
Jesse Soric	6	SO	6	Elliot Kear
Vojislav Dedic	7	SH	7	Josh Ralph
Jake O'Meley	8	PR	8	Huw Worthington
Sasha Popovic	9	HK	9	Matty Fozard
Milos Calic	10	PF	10	Ben Evans
Stefan Arsic	11	SR	11	Connor Davies
Nikola Djuric	12	SR	12	Max Clarke
Enis Bibic	13	LF	13	Sam Bowring
Dzavid Jasari	14	IN	14	Curtis Davies
Ilija Cotric	15	IN	15	Matt Ross
Djordje Krnjeta	16	IN	16	Anthony Walker
Marko Jankovic	17	IN	17	Ashton Robinson
Aleksandar Pavlovic	18	RES	18	Fin Yates
Darren Fisher		Coach		Mark Moxon

22 October 2024
19:30 CEST (UTC+02:00)

France	74–8	Ukraine
Tries: Vailhe, Budde, Pedrero (3), Vailhen, Pelissier (2), Zenon, Goffin, Jouffret, Aispuro Bichett (2), Martin; Goals: Albert (6/10), Aispuro Bichett (3/4)	1st: 48–0; 2nd: 26–8; Report	Tries: Skorbach, Polata

Stade Albert Domec, Carcassonne
Attendance: 1,257
Referee: Stephane Vincent (France)

Team details
France		Position	Ukraine
Name	Number	Position	Number	Name
Louis Jouffret	1	FB	1	Yevhhen Davydov
Nittim Pedrero	2	WG	2	Tigris Polata
Guilerno Aispuro Bichett	3	CE	3	Mykhailo Troian
Tanguy Zenon	4	CE	4	Jonah Ngaronoa
Clement Martin	5	WG	5	Danylo Vedler
Lucas Albert	6	SO	6	Oleksandr Skorbach
Thomas Lacans	7	SH	7	Daniel Janissen
Clement Boyer	8	PR	8	Oleksandr Syvokoz
Nolan Lopez-Buttignol	9	HK	9	Dmytro Semerenko
Florien Vailhen	10	PF	10	Volodymyr Karpenko
Jayson Goffin	11	SR	11	Yevhenii Trusov
Hnaloan Budden	12	SR	12	Tom Mencinksy
Mickael Goudemand	13	LF	13	Victor Tereszko
Eloi Pelissier	14	IN	14	Yaroslav Davydov
Tiaki Chan	15	IN	15	Vitalii Puchkov
Hugo Salabio	16	IN	16	Yevhen Checheta
Justin Sangare	17	IN	17	Valentyn Korchak
Laurent Frayssinous		Coach		Dan Beardshaw

==== Third place playoff ====
The third-place playoff formed part of the tournament but had no bearing on qualification.

26 October 2024
17:00 CEST (UTC+02:00)

Ukraine	10–50	Serbia
Tries: Vedler, Skorbach; Goals: Jannissen (0/1), Skorbach (1/1)	1st: 0–22; 2nd: 10–28; Report	Tries: Popovic, Pavlovic (2), N. Cotric (2), I. Cotric, Nofoaluma, Jankovic, O'Meley; Goals: Soric (6/7), O'Meley (1/2)

Stade Municipal, Saint-Estève
Referee: Mo Drizza (France)

Team details
Ukraine		Position	Serbia
Name	Number	Position	Number	Name
Yevhhen Davydov	1	FB	1	David Nofoaluma
Tigris Polata	2	WG	2	Rajko Trifunovic
Mykhailo Troian	3	CE	3	Nikola Cotic
Vitali Puchov	4	CE	4	Aleksandar Pavlovic
Danylo Vedler	5	WG	5	Andrej Mora
Oleksandr Skorbach	6	SO	6	Nick O'Meley
Daniel Jannissen	7	SH	7	Jesse Soric
Volodymyr Karpenko	8	PR	8	Jake O'Meley
Dmytro Semerenko	9	HK	9	Sasha Popovic
Oleksandr Syvokoz	10	PF	10	Enis Bibic
Jonah Ngaronoa	11	SR	11	Ilija Cotric
Yevhenii Trusov	12	SR	12	Nikola Djuric
Tom Menchinksy	13	LF	13	Stevan Stevanovic
Valentyn Korchak	14	IN	14	Vuk Štrbac
Yaroslav Davydov	15	IN	15	Milos Calic
Yevhen Checheta	16	IN	16	Marko Jankovic
Oleksandr Shcherbyna	17	IN	17	Jason Muranka
Dan Beardshaw		Coach		Darren Fisher

==== Final ====
26 October 2024
14:30 CEST (UTC+02:00)

Wales	6–48	France
Tries: Williams; Goals: Fozard (1/1)	1st: 6–20; 2nd: 0–28; Report	Tries: Romano, Rouge (2), Franco, Pelissier, Sangare, Fages, Belmas, Chan; Goals: Rouge (6/9)

Stade Municipal, Saint-Estève
Attendance: 2,150
Referee: Aaron Moore (England)

Team details
Wales		Position	France
Name	Number	Position	Number	Name
Billy Walkley	1	FB	1	Cesar Rouge
Joe Coope-Franklin	2	WG	2	Hakim Miloudi
Mike Butt	3	CE	3	Arthur Romano
Will Evans	4	CE	4	Mathieu Laguerre
Rhys Williams	5	WG	5	Romain Franco
Elliot Kear	6	SO	6	Ugo Tison
Josh Ralph	7	SH	7	Theo Fages
Huw Worthington	8	PR	8	Lambert Belmas
Matthew Fozard	9	HK	9	Alrix Da Costa
Ben Evans	10	PF	10	Tiaki Chan
Connor Davies	11	SR	11	Maxime Stefani
Matt Ross	12	SR	12	Mathieu Cozza
Sam Bowring	13	LF	13	Mickael Goudemand
Curtis Davies	14	IN	14	Eloi Pelissier
Anthony Walker	15	IN	15	Justin Sangare
Ashton Robinson	16	IN	16	Clement Boyer
Sam Grice	17	IN	17	Anthony Marion
Mark Moxon		Coach		Laurent Frayssinous

=== England wheelchair v France ===
Fassolette-Kielty Trophy

26 October 2024
14:30 BST (UTC+01:00)

England	66–33	France
Tries: Butler, Hawkins (4), Bechara (2), Coyd, Halliwell, Billington (2); Goals: Collins 11/11	Report	Tries: L Hivernat (2), Doré, Penella, Zittel (2); Goals: L Hivernat 3/3, Alazard 0/1, Penella 1/2; Drop goals: Clausells

Robin Park Arena, Wigan
Attendance: 598
Referees: Ollie Cruickshank (Scotland), Rebecca Whiteley (England)

Team details
England		Position	France
Name	Number	Position	Number	Name
Tom Halliwell	1	Starter	1	Gilles Clausells
Rob Hawkins	2	Starter	2	Adrien Zittel
Nathan Collins	3	Starter	3	Jorge Gelade Panzo
Josh Butler	4	Starter	4	Leo Hivernat
Lewis King	5	Starter	5	Jonathan Hivernat
Joe Coyd	6	Interchange	6	Lionel Alazard
Mason Billington	7	Interchange	7	Julien Penella
Seb Bechara	8	Interchange	8	Damien Doré
Jack Heggie	9	9th player	9	Jérémy Bourson
Tom Coyd		Coach		Cyril Torres

=== Philippines men v Malta in Australia ===
Friendship Trophy

26 October 2024
16:00 AEST (UTC:+10:00)

Philippines	26–24	Malta
Tries: Rosario (2), Avery, Acheampong, Stephenson; Goals: Forrest (3/5)	Report	Tries: Phillips (2), Ua-Paepaerei, Camilleri; Goals: T. Cassel (4/4)

New Era Stadium, Sydney, Australia
Referee: Cameron Turner (Australia)

Team details
Philippines		Position	Malta
Name	Number	Position	Number	Name
Jerome Williams,	1	FB	1	Benjamin Zahra
Isaac Acheampong,	2	WG	2	Cooper Barlow
Johansel Avery,	3	CE	3	Riley Tonna
Ned Stephenson,	4	CE	4	Kyle Cassel
Issac Rosario,	5	WG	5	Marley Cassel
Gerald Ubaldo,	6	SO/FE	6	Jaiden Paepaerei
Nikolas Forrest,	7	SH/HB	7	Aaron Grech
Ian Nelson,	8	PR	8	Luke Moore
Tyrone Tootell,	9	HK	9	Jai Camilleri
Jeromy Cairns,	10	PF	10	Blake Phillips
Russell Nelson,	11	SR	11	Tyler Cassel
Steven Bernstrom,	12	SR	12	Braydon Sherry
James Hannaford,	13	LF/LK	13	Anthony Bucca
Ashley Marshall,	14	IN	14	Adam Zahra
Liam Byrnes,	15	IN	15	Trystin Ua-Paepaerei
Juan Carlos Almonte,	16	IN	16	Tyson Jackson
Jordan Jones	17	IN	17	Will Exton
		RES	18	Nicholas Galea
Paul Sheedy		Coach		Aaron McDonald

=== England men vs Samoa ===
27 October 2024
14:30 GMT (UTC±00:00)

England	34–18	Samoa
Tries: Farnworth 7', Ashton 15', 58', Williams 20', Radley 49', Lewis 71'; Goals: Smith (5/6) 8', 21', 50', 59', 72'	1st: 16–6; 2nd: 18–12; Report (BBC)	Tries: Mariner 33', 53'; Chan Kum Tong 75'; Goals: Pauga (3/3) 34', 54', 76'

Brick Community Stadium, Wigan
Attendance: 15,137
Referee: Liam Moore (England)
Touch judges: Marcus Griffiths (England), Cameron Worsley (England)
Video referee: Jack Smith (England)
Player of the Match: George Williams (England)

Team details
England		Position	Samoa
Name	Number	Position	Number	Name
Jack Welsby	1	FB	1	Roger Tuivasa-Sheck
Dom Young	2	WG	2	Jeral Skelton
Harry Newman	3	CE	3	Izack Tago
Herbie Farnworth	4	CE	4	Junior Pauga
Matty Ashton	5	WG	5	Deine Mariner
George Williams	6	SO/FE	6	Anthony Milford
Harry Smith	7	SH/HB	7	Jarome Luai
Ethan Havard	8	PR	8	Francis Molo
Daryl Clark	9	HK	9	Jazz Tevaga
Matty Lees	10	PF	10	Terrell May
Kai Pearce-Paul	11	SR	11	Shawn Blore
John Bateman	12	SR	12	Jeremiah Nanai
Victor Radley	13	LF/LK	13	John Asiata
Mikey Lewis	14	IN	14	Blaize Talagi
Mike McMeeken	15	IN	15	Luciano Leilua
Morgan Knowles	16	IN	16	Gordon Chan Kum Tong
Tom Burgess	17	IN	17	Lazarus Vaalepu
Ben Currie	18	RES	18	Keenan Palasia
Shaun Wane		Coach		Ben Gardiner

2 November 2024
14:30 GMT (UTC±00:00)

England	34–16	Samoa
Tries: Marshall 17'; Williams 28'; Ashton 31'; Farnworth 37', 54' Welsby 67'; Goals: Smith (5/7) 5' (pen), 18', 40', 56', 68'	1st: 22–6; 2nd: 12–10; Report (BBC)	Tries: Blore 8'; J. Tago 44'; Nanai 73'; Goals: Pauga (2/3) 9', 46'

Headingley, Leeds
Attendance: 16,068
Referee: Chris Kendall (England)
Touch judges: Warren Turley (England), Mark Craven (England)
Video referee: Ben Thaler (England)
Player of the Match: Herbie Farnworth (England)

Team details
England		Position	Samoa
Name	Number	Position	Number	Name
Jack Welsby 67'	1	FB	1	Roger Tuivasa-Sheck
Matty Ashton 31'	2	WG	2	Jeral Skelton
Harry Newman	3	CE	23	Jake Tago 44'
Herbie Farnworth 37', 54'	4	CE	4	Junior Pauga 9', 46' (yellow card) 25' to 35'
Liam Marshall 17'	5	WG	5	Deine Mariner
George Williams 28'	6	SO/FE	6	Blaize Talagi
Harry Smith 5' (pen)', 18', 40', 56', 68'	7	SH/HB	7	Jarome Luai
Ethan Havard (substituted off) 18', (substituted on) 75'	8	PR	8	Francis Molo (substituted off) 27', (substituted on) 68'
Daryl Clark (substituted off) 59'	9	HK	9	Jazz Tevaga (substituted off) 27'
Matty Lees (substituted off) 32', (substituted on) 52'	10	PF	10	Terrell May
John Bateman	11	SR	11	Shawn Blore 8'
Junior Nsemba (substituted off) 65'	12	SR	12	Jeremiah Nanai 73'
Victor Radley (substituted off) 23', (substituted on) 61'	13	LF/LK	13	Luciano Leilua (substituted off) 51', (substituted on) 68'
Mikey Lewis (substituted on) 59'	14	IN	14	Simi Sasagi
Morgan Knowles (substituted on) 23', (substituted off) 75'	15	IN	15	Keenan Palasia (substituted on) 27'
Mike McMeeken (substituted on) 32', (substituted off) 52', (substituted on) 65'	16	IN	16	Gordon Chan Kum Tong (substituted on) 27'
Luke Thompson (substituted on) 18'	17	IN	17	Lazarus Vaalepu (substituted on) 51'
Ben Currie	18	RES	18	Anthony Milford
Shaun Wane		Coach		Ben Gardiner

=== Scotland men v Ireland in England ===
27 October 2024
14:00 GMT (UTC+00:00)

Scotland	6–36	Ireland
Tries: Fletcher; Goals: Farrell (1/1)	Report	Tries: King, McGowan, Keyes (2), Farrar, Rushton; Goals: Dean (6/7)

Gateshead International Stadium, Newcastle-upon-Tyne
Attendance: 463
Referee: Tom Grant (England)

Team details
Scotland		Position	Ireland
Name	Number	Position	Number	Name
Hayden Cumming	1	FB	1	Aidan McGowan
Cameron Cullen	2	WG	2	Lewis Wing
Brett Carter	3	CE	3	Zack McComb
Bayley Liu	4	CE	4	Keanan Brand
Jonny Hutton	5	WG	5	Stephen Cahill
Oscar Thomas	6	SO	6	Riley Dean
Izaac Farrell	7	SH	7	Joe Keyes
Jack Teanby	8	PR	8	Pat Moran
Ross Whitmore	9	HK	9	Liam O'Callaghan
Kieran Moran	10	PF	10	Ronan Michael
Charlie Emslie	11	SR	11	Harry Rushton
Dale Ferguson	12	SR	12	Ryan Hogg
Matty Fletcher	13	LF	13	George King
Peter Burns	14	IN	14	Aaron Lynch
Isaac Reid	15	IN	15	Michael Ward
Ben Morris	16	IN	16	Samuel Winney
Jacob Grierson	17	IN	17	James Farrar
Nathan Graham		Coach		Ged Corcoran

== November ==
=== New Zealand wheelchair v Australia ===
1 November 2024
10:30 NZDT (UTC+13:00)

New Zealand	4–98	Australia
Tries: Tapp	Report	Tries: McKenna (5), Anstey (5), Cannane (3), Schumacher (2), Arbuckle, Grove; Goals: McKenna (12), Karim (3)

Eventfinda Stadium, North shore, Auckland
Referees: Kale Popple (Australia), Steve Hewson (Australia)
Touch judges: Jordan Chand (New Zealand), Alan Caddy (New Zealand)

Team details
New Zealand		Position	Australia
Name	Number	Position	Number	Name
Nikia Fa’atau	1	Starter	1	Peter Arbuckle
Robert Graham	2	Starter	2	Daniel Anstey
Jayson Hooker	3	Starter	3	Cory Cannane
Kauri Murray	4	Starter	4	Brad Grove
Dan Scott	5	Starter	5	Bayley McKenna
Ryan Charles	6	Interchange	6	Toby Popple
Charles Joyce	7	Interchange	7	Zac Schumacher
Jamie Tapp	8	Interchange	8	Dian Karim
Edie George		Coach		Brett Clare

4 November 2024
12:30 NZDT (UTC+13:00)

New Zealand	8–110	Australia
Tries: Charles, Tapp; Goals: Scott (0/2)		Tries: Anstey (5), McKenna (4), Grove (4), Cannane (2), Popple (2), Karim (2), Schumacher (2); Goals: Schumacher (7/8), McKenna (4/6), Anstey (1/1), Popple (1/2), Grove (0/1), Karim (0/1), Arbuckle (0/2)

Eventfinda Stadium, North Shore, Auckland
Referees: Kale Popple (Australia), Steve Hewson (Australia)
Touch judges: Jordan Chand (New Zealand), Alan Caddy (New Zealand)

Team details
New Zealand		Position	Australia
Name	Number	Position	Number	Name
Ryan Charles	1	Starter	1	Peter Arbuckle
Lance Pakura	2	Starter	2	Bayley McKenna
Jamie Tapp	3	Starter	3	Brad Grove
Slade St John	4	Starter	4	Daniel Anstey
Kauri Murray	5	Starter	5	Cory Cannane
Jayson Hooker	6	Interchange	6	Toby Popple
Dan Scott	7	Interchange	7	Zac Schumacher
Yann Roux	8	Interchange	8	Dian Karim
Edie George		Coach		Brett Clare

=== England women v Wales ===
Match played as the first part of a double-header with the second men's match between England and Samoa.

2 November 2024
12:00 GMT (UTC+00:00)

England	82–0	Wales
Tries: Wood, Davies (5), Travis (2), Partington (2), Brown (3), Stott, Mottershead, Dodd; Goals: Rowe (9/16)	Report

Headingley Rugby Stadium, Leeds
Referee: James Vella (Australia)

Team details
England		Position	Wales
Name	Number	Position	Number	Name
Amelia Brown	1	FB	1	Leanne Burnell
Eboni Partington	2	WG	2	Dani McGifford
Erin Stott	3	CE	3	Agnes Wood
Amy Hardcastle	4	CE	4	Ashlea Prescott
Anna Davies	5	WG	5	Lucia Davies
Zoe Harris	6	SO	6	Rhi Parker
Isabel Rowe	7	SH	7	Megan Whittaker
Olivia Wood	8	PR	8	Emily Hughes
Keara Bennett	9	HK	9	Carys Marsh
Shona Hoyle	10	PF	10	Katie Carr
Hollie Dodd	11	SR	11	Hannah Jones
Paige Travis	12	SR	12	Georgia Taylor
Jodie Cunningham	13	LF	13	Bethan Dainton
Katie Mottershead	14	IN	14	Jasmine Gibbons
Vicky Whitfield	15	IN	15	Amy Price
Bella Sykes	16	IN	16	Ffion Jenkins
Izzy Northrop	17	IN	17	Sara Jones
Mary Coleman	18	RES	18	Gracie Hobbs
Stuart Barrow		Coach		Thomas Brindle

=== 2026 Women's World Cup, Americas qualifying ===
The curtain raiser was intended to be a second semi-final featuring Brazil. However, a late withdrawal saw them replaced by the USA Pioneers and the draw redone. As the Pioneers are illegible for the World Cup they were consigned to the third place play-off, with both their games being classed as a friendly and not part of the tournament.

==== Curtain raiser ====
6 November 2024

Canada	80–0†	USA Pioneers
	Report

University of North Florida, Jacksonville, United States

==== Semi-final ====
6 November 2024
19:00 ET (UTC-05:00)

Jamaica	0–44	United States
	Report	Tries: Fisch (2), A’au, Bailous (3), Black, Treco; Goals: Treco (6/8)

University of North Florida, Jacksonville, United States
Referee: Michael Smaill (New Zealand)

Team details
Jamaica		Position	United States
Name	Number	Position	Number	Name
Chevelle Clarke	1	FB	1	Miranda Barnard
Shanice Stewart	2	WG	2	Marcaya Bailous
Gianna Noble-Cunningham	3	CE	3	Christine Sargent
Makeda Lewis	4	CE	4	Cynthia Campbell
Veronica Blair	5	WG	5	Haley Sheldon
Shanique Smith	6	SO	6	Samantha Black
Aniya Smith	7	SH	7	Courtney Treco
Else Royal	8	PR	8	Narcisse Jordan
Alicia Richards	9	HK	9	Nicole Fisch
Darcey Pryce	10	PF	10	Kadie Sandford
Shoya Gordon	11	SR	11	Rachael Bradley
Kaya-Jo Laing	12	SR	12	Jeanna Beard
Tarja Richards	13	LF	13	Esther Anderson
MacKayla McCalla	14	IN	14	Tiara A'au
Kamoya Forrest	15	IN	15	Ashley Mencke
Debisha Scarlett	16	IN	16	Taylor White
Sherine Johnson	17	IN	17	Robyn Oliveri
Andrew Dixon		Coach		Sean Rutgerson

==== Third place play-off ====
9 November 2024

Jamaica	48–12†	USA Pioneers
	Report

University of North Florida, Jacksonville, United States

==== Final ====
9 November 2024
16:00 ET (UTC-05:00)

Canada	40–8	United States
Tries: Crowl (3), Sears, Choboter, Pakulis (2); Goals: Franada (1/2), Sears (3/3), Aberg (2/2)	Report	Tries: Sheldon (2); Goals: Treco (0/2)

University of North Florida, Jacksonville, United States
Referee: Michael Smaill (New Zealand)

Team details
Canada		Position	United States
Name	Number	Position	Number	Name
Lauren Mueller	1	FB	1	Miranda Barnard
Brittany Jones	2	WG	2	Marcya Baylous
Petra Woods	3	CE	3	Cyndi Campbell
Candace Scholten	4	CE	4	Christine Sargent
Andie Girard	5	WG	5	Haley Sheldon
Dani Franada	6	SO	6	Courtney Treco
Ale Lewis	7	SH	7	Samantha Black
Sarah Maguire	8	PR	8	Narcisse Jordan
Caitlin Sears	9	HK	9	Nicole Fisch
Chantelle Crowl	10	PF	10	Kadie Sandford
Gabrielle Hindley	11	SR	11	Rachael Bradley
Maddy Aberg	12	SR	12	Ashley Mencke
Megan Pakulis	13	LF	13	Sara Esther Anderson
Natalie Tam	14	IN	14	Tiara A'au
Rachel Choboter	15	IN	15	Shamarica Scott
Tamisha Toussaint	16	IN	16	Robyn Oliveri
Eleta Mitton	17	IN	17	Taylor White
Mike Castle		Coach		Sean Rutgerson

=== Spain wheelchair v England in France ===
21 November 2024
17:00 CET (UTC+01:00)

Spain	28–58	England
Tries: Heggie (3), Coyd (4), Haynes (2), Owen; Goals: Heggie (8/8), Owen (1/2)	Report	Tries: Lacombe (2), Y. Martin (3); Goals: Seron (2/2), Y. Martin (2/3)

CREPS des Pays de la Loire, Nantes
Attendance: 400
Referees: Djamel Merzouk (France), Ludo Pioginni (France)

Team details
England		Position	Spain
Name	Number	Position	Number	Name
Wayne Boardman	1	Starter	1	Mathieu Monedero
Joe Coyd	2	Starter	2	Anthony Martin
Jack Heggie	3	Starter	3	Joel Lacombe
Adam Rigby	4	Starter	4	Yannick Martin
Chris Haynes	5	Starter	5	Wilfrid Seron
Jason Owen	6	Interchange	6	Pascal Ambrosino
Tristen Norfolk	7	Interchange	7	Eric Perez
Nathan Holmes	8	Interchange
Tom Coyd		Coach		Jean-Marc Gonzalez

=== France wheelchair v Ireland ===
21 November 2024
20:00 CET (UTC+01:00)

France	62–20	Ireland
Tries: Vargas (4), Puly (3), Botte, Panzo, Candela, Dunhalde; Goals: Duhalde (5/5), Candela (4/5)	Report	Tries: Spain, Calcott, Horgan, Burton-Carter; Goals: Burton-Carter (1/3), Johnston (1/1)

CREPS des Pays de la Loire, Nantes
Attendance: 400
Referees: Laurent Bonnet (France), Ollie Cruickshank (Scotland)

Team details
France		Position	Ireland
Name	Number	Position	Number	Name
Pierre Botte	1	Starter	1	Oran Spain
Victor Puly	2	Starter	2	Joe Calcott
Thomas Duhalde	3	Starter	3	Toby Burton-Carter
Guillaume Dubrue	4	Starter	4	Peter Johnston
Jorge Gelade Panzo	5	Starter	5	Melanie Griffiths
Thomas Candela	6	Interchange	6	Cian Horgan
Lisa Lartigue	7	Interchange	7	James McCarthy
Arno Vargas	8	Interchange	8	Matthew Wooloff
Cyril Torres		Coach		Phil Roberts

=== France wheelchair v England ===
Fassolette-Kielty Trophy

23 November 2024
17:00 CET (UTC+01:00)

France	32–28	England
Tries: N. Clausells (4), Hivernat; Goals: N. Clausells (6/6)	Report	Tries: Butler (2), Bechara, Hawkins (2); Goals: Collins (4/5)

Pole Hippique, Saint-Lô
Referees: Ollie Cruickshank (Scotland), Djamel Merzouk (France)

Team details
France		Position	England
Name	Number	Position	Number	Name
Gilles Clausells	1	Starter	1	Tom Halliwell
Florian Gattadoro	2	Starter	2	Rob Hawkins
Jeremy Bourson	3	Starter	3	Nathan Collins
Damien Dore	4	Starter	4	Josh Butler
Leo Hivernat	5	Starter	5	Lewis King
Julien Penella	6	Interchange	6	Jack Brown
Nicolas Clausells	7	Interchange	7	Mason Billington
Jonathan Hivernat	8	Interchange	8	Seb Bechara
Lionel Alazard	9	9th player	9	Joe Coyd
Cyril Torres		Coach		Tom Coyd

=== South American Championship ===
The South American championship was a three-way tournament between Argentina, Brazil and Chile on a round-robin basis. Each team won one and lost match but Chile were declared the tournament winners on points difference.

29 November 2024
11:00 AT (UTC-03:00)

Brazil	22–44	Chile
Tries: Cabral, Mancini, Patez, Vinicius; Goals: Grundy (2/3), Amato (1/1)		Tries: Tobar (3), Doberer (2), Garrido, Pizarro, Polanco; Goals: Black (6/8)

Camioneros Escobar Rugby Club, Buenos Aires
Referee: Emiliano Rodriguez (Argentina)

Team details
Brazil		Position	Chile
Name	Number	Position	Number	Name
Nassor Lukata	1	FB	1	Felipe Aedo Munoz
Emerson Bertagnoli	2	WG	2	Daniel Polanco Perez
Fabio Lopes Jose	3	CE	3	Jaime Santander Toro
Luca Pereira	4	CE	4	Fernando Arancibia
Ivan Mancini	5	WG	5	Juan Ortiz Higuera
Alcino Amato	6	FE	6	Nick Doberer
Zach Grundy	7	HB	7	Thomas Garrido
Matheus Muller	8	PR	8	Luis Pizarro Godoy
Jorge Cabral	9	HK	9	Mitch Black
Bruno Gil	10	PF	10	Javier Carrasco
Gabriel Saraiva	11	SR	11	Dylan Attard
Jonathan Patez	12	SR	12	Austin Olivares
Nicholas Sydorowitz	13	LK	13	Brandon Tobar
Alyfer Vinicius	14	IN	14	Taylor Vargas
Heron Godoi	15	IN	15	Aldo Cerezo
Marcelo Amato	16	IN	16	Mauro Caceres
Daniel Vecchia	17	IN	17	Diego Vargas

30 November 2024
14:00 AT (UTC-03:00)

Argentina	26–28	Brazil
Tries: Balza, Escobar, Silva, Staiewicz; Goals: Molina (3/4)		Tries: Cabral, Lopes Jose, Mancini, Melo, Vinicius; Goals: Grundy (4/5)

Camioneros Escobar Rugby Club, Buenos Aires
Referee: Juan Blumetti (Argentina)

Team details
Argentina		Position	Chile
Name	Number	Position	Number	Name
Santiago Villar	1	FB	1	Emerson Bertagnoli
Mariano Pacheco	2	WG	2	Joao Paulo Cabral
Lucas Balza	3	CE	3	Jorge Cabral
Lucas Escobar	4	CE	4	Lucas Pereira
Santiago Gabarruz	5	WG	5	Ivan Mancini
Rodrigo Molina	6	FE	6	Fabio Lopes Jose
Gustavo Cosso	7	HB	7	Zach Grundy (C)
Camilo Mauro	8	PR	8	Matheus Muller
Gabriel Stasiewicz	9	HK	9	Nassor Lukata
Ulises Silva	10	PF	10	Alyfer Vinicius
Maximiliano Abrego	11	SR	11	Gabriel Saraiva
Daniel Byrne	12	SR	12	Bruno Gil Melo
Leonardo Barrera (C)	13	LK	13	Nicholas Sydorowitz
Nicolas Prieto	14	IN	14	Heron Godoi
German Barragan	15	IN	15	Marcelo Amato
Diego Gonzales	16	IN	16	Daniel Vecchia
Brian Cofre	17	IN	17	Rogerio Simoes
Pablo Leccadito		Coach		Caio Ozzioli

1 December 2024
15:30 AT (UTC-03:00)

Argentina	32–30	Chile
Tries: Gabarruz (2), Mauro (2), Escobar, Silva; Goals: Villar (3/4), Balza (1/2)		Tries: Doberer, Aedo, Black, Garrido; Goals: Black (5/5)

Camioneros Escobar Rugby Club, Buenos Aires
Referee: Juan Blumetti (Argentina)

Team details
Argentina		Position	Chile
Name	Number	Position	Number	Name
Lucas Balza	1	FB	1	Felipe Aedo
Mariano Pacheco	2	WG	2	Daniel Polanco
Daniel Byrne	3	CE	3	Jamie Santander
Lucas Escobar	4	CE	4	Fernando Arancibia
Santiago Gabarruz	5	WG	5	Juan Ortiz
Santiago Villar	6	FE	6	Nick Doberer (C)
Gustavo Cosso	7	HB	7	Thomas Garrido
Camilo Mauro	8	PR	8	Luis Pizarro
Gabriel Stasiewicz	9	HK	9	Mitchell Black
Ulises Silva	10	PF	10	Javier Carrasco
Diego Gonzales	11	SR	11	Dylan Concha Attard
Brian Cofre	12	SR	12	Taylor Salas
Leonardo Barrera (C)	13	LK	13	Brandon Tobar
Nicolas Prieto	14	IN	14	Austin Olivares
German Barragan	15	IN	15	Aldo Cerezo
Agustin Cabezas	16	IN	16	Mauro Caceres
		IN	17	Diego Vargas
Pablo Leccadito		Coach		Andrew Charles

== December ==
=== Philippines men v Hong Kong ===
1 December 2024

Philippines	20–34	Hong Kong

Philsports Complex Ultra, Pasig, Philippines

=== South Africa men v the United States ===
4 December 2024
18:00 SAST (UTC+02:00)

South Africa	18–38	United States
Tries: Makhari, Strauss, Meyer; Goals: Makhari (3/3)	Report	Tries: Vidot, Williams (3), Piggins, McCrory, Lipscomb, Bannerot; Goals: McCrory (3/5), Granby (0/3)

Quins-Bobbies Rugby Club, Pretoria
Referee: Cody Kuxmann (USA)

Team details
South Africa		Position	USA
Name	Number	Position	Number	Name
Junaide Seedat	1	FB	1	David Washington
Brandan Le Sar	2	WG	2	Ethan Ferrick
Heinrich Rademeyer	3	CE	3	Ryan Burroughs
Wynand de Sousa	4	CE	4	Daniel Vidot
Graig Pienaar	5	WG	5	Andre Williams
Jean Coetzer	6	SO	6	Ryan Bannerot
Jason Makhari	7	SH	7	Peter Lupton
CP Louw	8	PR	8	Tevita Bryce
Franco van Deventer	9	HK	9	Mason McCrory
Rourke Lyte-Mason	10	PF	10	Anthony Russo
Simba Janga	11	SR	11	Wes Piggins
C-Jay Strauss	12	SR	12	Joe Eichner
Alan Kasselman	13	LF	13	Anson Jiang
Crisjan Meyer	14	IN	14	Dom Sofe
Dylan Venter	15	IN	15	Derek Lipscomb
Wessel Cronje	16	IN	16	Kyle Granby
Frikkie Jansen	17	IN	17	Max Dacey

7 December 2024
16:00 SAST (UTC+02:00)

South Africa	32–44	United States
Tries: Pienaar (3), Rademyer, Coetzer, Campbell, Venter; Goals: Makhari (1/6), Campbell (1/1)	Report	Tries: Gillard (3), Vidot (2), Bryce (2), Lupton, Bannerot; Goals: McCrory (4/9)

Grizzlies Rugby Club, Pretoria
Referee: Cody Kuxmann (USA)

Team details
South Africa		Position	USA
Name	Number	Position	Number	Name
James Cambell	1	FB	1	David Washington
Shaun Matsane	2	WG	2	Ulice Gillard
Heinrich Rademeyer	3	CE	3	Ryan Burroughs
Jean Coetzer	4	CE	4	Daniel Vidot
Graig Pienaar	5	WG	5	Andre Williams
Junaide Seedat	6	SO	6	Ryan Bannerot
Jason Makhari	7	SH	7	Peter Lupton
C-Jay Strauss	8	PR	8	Tevita Bryce
Franco van Deventer	9	HK	9	Mason McCrory
Frikkie Jansen	10	PF	10	Anson Jiang
Dylan Venter	11	SR	11	Wes Piggins
Simba Janga	12	SR	12	Max Dacey
Allan Kasselman	13	LF	13	Joe Eichner
Crisjan Meyer	14	IN	14	Dominic Sofe
Rourke Lyte-Mason	15	IN	15	Derek Lipscomb
Marcelle Corneelsen	16	IN	16	Kyle Granby
CP Louw	17	IN	17	Gunnar Johnson

=== Albania men v Greece ===
7 December 2024
13:00 CET (UTC+01:00)

Albania	0–86	Greece
	Report	Tries: Nake, Linoxylakis, Chionis (3), Tuliatu, Tsakalos (2), Stefanou, Katsigannis (3), Varypatis, Dardamanis; Goals: Eskioglou (13/15)

Stadium I Vorës, Tirana
Referee: Nenad Zujic (Serbia)

Team details
Albania		Position	Greece
Name	Number	Position	Number	Name
Andi Zeneli	1	FB	1	Ioannis Nake
Andi Tanushi	2	WG	2	Alexandros Linoxylakis
Stilian Sala	3	CE	3	Panagiotis Varypatis
Ergys Murati	4	CE	4	Georgios Chionis
Dajan Shatraj	5	WG	5	Athanasous Katsigannis
Dorjan Dervishi	6	SO	6	Stefanos Eskioglou
Albert Sheu	7	SH	7	Aris Dardamanis
Girsjan Priska	8	PR	8	Evangelos Velisaris
Shaban Penxho	9	HK	9	Nikolaos Stefanou
Rigers Kurti	10	PF	10	Nektarios Tsakalos
Aurel Gjeloshi	11	SR	11	Ioannis Fragkos
Alban Alia	12	SR	12	Aris Koulizakis
Senad Kurtaj	13	LF	13	Robert Tuliatu
Kristi Papa	14	IN	14	Stefanos Bastas
Arnaldo Telo	15	IN	15	Panagiotis Karefilis
Jurgen Xhan	16	IN	16	Nikolaos Mayreas
Fabian Thanasaj	17	IN	17	Evangelos Palogianndis
Arnaldo Telo		Coach		Robert Tuliatu
