= Rugby in Argentina =

Rugby in Argentina may refer to:

- Rugby league in Argentina
- Rugby union in Argentina
