= 2026 Men's Rugby League World Cup qualification – Europe =

- Number of teams: 4
- Host country: France
- Winner: France
- Matches played: 4
- Attendance: 3,407 (852 per match)
- Top scorers: (France) César Rougé (20) (Wales) Matty Fozard
- Top try scorers: (France) Nittim Pedrero (3) (France) Éloi Pélissier

The 2026 Men's Rugby League World Cup European qualification tournament was an international rugby league tournament held in October 2024 to decide the nation that qualifies for the 2025 World Series and in-turn, potentially qualify for the 2026 Men's Rugby League World Cup.

== Background ==
The tournament took place in October 2024 and was open to all full member nations as of 15 March 2024. The winner of the tournament advanced to the World Series in 2025.

On 14 March 2024, Ireland, Italy, and Scotland had their membership downgraded to affiliate members due to non-compliance with the membership policy, and as a result were no longer eligible to participate in the World Cup qualification process.

== Seeding and format ==
Teams played semi-finals and a final. The semi-finals were based on IRL Rank with highest-ranked playing lowest-ranked and second-highest playing second-lowest. The losing semi-finalists contested a third place playoff; this had no bearing on World Cup qualification, but did count for world ranking points.

The four eligible nations to compete in the tournament were confirmed to be participating on 25 July 2024; France, Serbia, Ukraine and Wales.

IRL Men's World Rankings – Europe
Rank	Full	Team	Pts %
8	Yes	France	28
11	Yes	Serbia	19
12	No	Netherlands	17
13	No	Italy	15
14	No	Greece	15
15	No	Malta	14
16	No	Ireland	14
17	Yes	Wales	13
19	No	Scotland	9
20	Yes	Ukraine	7
21	No	Czech Republic	7
22	No	Germany	6
24	No	Poland	6
25	No	Norway	6
32	No	Montenegro	4
34	No	Turkey	3
35	No	North Macedonia	3
36	No	Bulgaria	3
38	No	Spain	2
40	No	Albania	1
45	No	Russia	0
46	No	Sweden	0
47	No	Bosnia and Herzegovina	0
48	No	Hungary	0
53	No	Latvia	0
54	No	Denmark	0
55	No	Belgium	0
56	No	Estonia	0

== Venues ==
The venues selected for the tournament were:

Carcassonne	Saint-Estève
Stade Albert Domec	Stade Municipal
Capacity: 10,000	Capacity: 6,000
2026 Men's Rugby League World Cup qualification – Europe is located in Occitanie

== Squads ==
On 16 October 2024, the squads were announced for the four nations competing in the tournament.

=== France ===
Player	Club
Jayson Goffin	(France) Albi
Nittim Pedrero	(France) Albi
Romain Franco	(England) Bradford Bulls
Lucas Albert	(France) Carcassonne
Vincent Albert	(France) Carcassonne
Clément Boyer	(France) Carcassonne
Nolan Lopez-Buttignol	(France) Carcassonne
Guillermo Aispuro Bichet	(France) Catalans Dragons
Alrix Da Costa	(France) Catalans Dragons
Théo Fages	(France) Catalans Dragons
Matthieu Laguerre	(France) Catalans Dragons
Clement Martin	(France) Catalans Dragons
Arthur Mourgue	(France) Catalans Dragons
Romain Navarrete	(France) Catalans Dragons
Arthur Romano	(France) Catalans Dragons
César Rougé	(France) Catalans Dragons
Thomas Lacans	(England) Featherstone Rovers
Louis Jouffret	(England) Halifax Panthers
Hugo Salabio	(England) Huddersfield Giants
Mickaël Goudemand	(England) Leeds Rhinos
Justin Sangaré	(England) Leeds Rhinos
Ugo Tison	(England) London Broncos
Hakim Miloudi	(France) Pia
Florian Vailhen	(France) Pia
Lambert Belmas	(France) Toulouse Olympique
Benjamin Laguerre	(France) Toulouse Olympique
Anthony Marion	(France) Toulouse Olympique
Éloi Pélissier	(France) Toulouse Olympique
Maxime Stefani	(France) Toulouse Olympique
Mathieu Cozza	(England) Wakefield Trinity
Tiaki Chan	(England) Wigan Warriors

=== Serbia ===
Player	Club
Nicholas O'Meley	(Australia) Burleigh Bears
Nick Cotric	(France) Catalans Dragons
Andrej Mora	(Serbia) Dorcol Tigers
David Nofoaluma	(Australia) Glebe Dirty Reds
Sasha Popovic	(Australia) Glebe Dirty Reds
Jake O’Meley	(Australia) Lakes United Seagulls
Ilija Cotric	(Australia) Mounties
Jesse Soric	New Zealand Warriors Reserves
Aleksandar Pavlovic	(Serbia) Partisan Belgrade
Djordje Krnjeta	(Serbia) Partisan Belgrade
Dzavid Jasari	(Serbia) Partisan Belgrade
Enis Bibic	(Serbia) Partisan Belgrade
Strahinja Stoiljkovic	(Serbia) Partisan Belgrade
Jordan Grant	(Australia) Penrith Panthers
Stefan Arsic	(Serbia) Radnicki Nis
Marko Jankovic	(Serbia) Red Star Belgrade
Milos Calic	(Serbia) Red Star Belgrade
Nikola Djuric	(Serbia) Red Star Belgrade
Rajko Trifunovic	(Serbia) Red Star Belgrade
Vojislav Dedic	(Serbia) Red Star Belgrade
Vuk Strbac	(Serbia) Red Star Belgrade
Joshua Coric	(Australia) St George Illawarra Dragons Reserves

=== Ukraine ===
Player	Club
Tim Knight	(Australia) Caloundra Sharks
Daniel Janissen	(Wales) Cardiff Cobras
Jonah Ngaronoa	(Australia) Glebe Dirty Reds
Yevhen Checheta	(Ukraine) Kharkiv Legion
Yevhen Davydov	(Ukraine) Kharkiv Legion
Anatolii Hrankovskyi	(Ukraine) Kharkiv Legion
Volodymyr Karpenko	(Ukraine) Kharkiv Legion
Vitalii Puchkov	(Ukraine) Kharkiv Legion
Dmytro Semerenko	(Ukraine) Kharkiv Legion
Oleksandr Shcherbyna	(Ukraine) Kharkiv Legion
Oleksandr Skorbach	(Ukraine) Kharkiv Legion
Oleksandr Syvykoz	(Ukraine) Kharkiv Legion
Mykhailo Troian	(Ukraine) Kharkiv Legion
Yevhenii Trusov	(Ukraine) Kharkiv Legion
Volodymyr Voitov	(Ukraine) Kharkiv Legion
Valentyn Korchak	(Ukraine) Lviv Tigers
Ostap Kozak	(Ukraine) Lviv Tigers
Victor Tereszko	(Australia) Queanbeyan Blues
Danylo Vedler	(Ukraine) Rivne Giants
Brock Jurkans	(Australia) Singleton Greyhounds
Tigris Polata	(Australia) Southern Suburbs Magpies
Tom Mencinsky	(Australia) Sydney University RLFC

=== Wales ===
Player	Club
Bailey Antrobus	(England) York Knights
Harry Boots	(England) Cornwall
Sam Bowring	(England) Midlands Hurricanes
Mike Butt	(England) Widnes Vikings
Max Clarke	(England) Barrow Raiders
Joe Coope-Franklin	(England) Salford Red Devils
Connor Davies	(England) Halifax Panthers
Curtis Davies	(England) Dewsbury Rams
Gil Dudson	(England) Warrington Wolves
Will Evans	(England) Whitehaven
Ben Evans	North Wales Crusaders
Jude Ferreira	(England) Hunslet
Matty Fozard	(England) Widnes Vikings
Charlie Glover	(England) Salford Red Devils
Elliot Kear (C)	(England) Batley Bulldogs
Ben Lane	(England) St. Helens
Rhodri Lloyd	(England) Widnes Vikings
Josh Ralph	(Australia) St. George Illawarra Dragons Reserves
Owen Restall	(England) Dewsbury Rams
Luis Roberts	(England) Leeds Rhinos
Ashton Robinson	(England) Leeds Rhinos
Matt Ross	(England) Cornwall
Anthony Walker	(England) Swinton Lions
Billy Walkley	(England) Keighley Cougars
Rhys Williams	(England) Swinton Lions
Huw Worthington	(England) Whitehaven

== Fixtures ==
=== Bracket ===
Semi-finals
8	France	74
20	Ukraine	8
11	Serbia	0
17	Wales	48

Final
France	48
Wales	6
Third-place playoff
Serbia	50
Ukraine	10

=== Semi-finals ===
22 October 2024
17:00 CEST (UTC+02:00)

Serbia	0–48	Wales
	1st: 0–30; 2nd: 0–18; Report	Tries: Fozard, Kear, Walker, Evans, Connor Davies, Butt, Worthington, Coope-Franklin; Goals: Fozard (7/7), Kear (1/1)

Stade Albert Domec, Carcassonne
Attendance: 1,257
Referee: Geoffrey Poumes (France)

Team details
Serbia		Position	Wales
Name	Number	Position	Number	Name
Nikola Cotic	1	FB	1	Billy Walkley
Rajko Trifunovic	2	WG	2	Joe Coope-Franklin
Nick O'Meley	3	CE	3	Mike Butt
David Nofoaluma	4	CE	4	Will Evans
Andrej Mora	5	WG	5	Rhys Williams
Jesse Soric	6	SO	6	Elliot Kear
Vojislav Dedic	7	SH	7	Josh Ralph
Jake O'Meley	8	PR	8	Huw Worthington
Sasha Popovic	9	HK	9	Matty Fozard
Milos Calic	10	PF	10	Ben Evans
Stefan Arsic	11	SR	11	Connor Davies
Nikola Djuric	12	SR	12	Max Clarke
Enis Bibic	13	LF	13	Sam Bowring
Dzavid Jasari	14	IN	14	Curtis Davies
Ilija Cotric	15	IN	15	Matt Ross
Djordje Krnjeta	16	IN	16	Anthony Walker
Marko Jankovic	17	IN	17	Ashton Robinson
Aleksandar Pavlovic	18	RES	18	Fin Yates
Darren Fisher		Coach		Mark Moxon

Wales head coach, John Kear, did not travel to France with the squad, after being admitted to hospital the preceding weekend. In his absence the team was coached by assistant coach, Mark Moxon.

22 October 2024
19:30 CEST (UTC+02:00)

France	74–8	Ukraine
Tries: Vailhe, Budde, Pedrero (3), Vailhen, Pelissier (2), Zenon, Goffin, Jouffret, Aispuro Bichett (2), Martin; Goals: Albert (6/10), Aispuro Bichett (3/4)	1st: 48–0; 2nd: 26–8; Report	Tries: Skorbach, Polata

Stade Albert Domec, Carcassonne
Attendance: 1,257
Referee: Stephane Vincent (France)

Team details
France		Position	Ukraine
Name	Number	Position	Number	Name
Louis Jouffret	1	FB	1	Yevhhen Davydov
Nittim Pedrero	2	WG	2	Tigris Polata
Guilerno Aispuro Bichett	3	CE	3	Mykhailo Troian
Tanguy Zenon	4	CE	4	Jonah Ngaronoa
Clement Martin	5	WG	5	Danylo Vedler
Lucas Albert	6	SO	6	Oleksandr Skorbach
Thomas Lacans	7	SH	7	Daniel Janissen
Clement Boyer	8	PR	8	Oleksandr Syvokoz
Nolan Lopez-Buttignol	9	HK	9	Dmytro Semerenko
Florien Vailhen	10	PF	10	Volodymyr Karpenko
Jayson Goffin	11	SR	11	Yevhenii Trusov
Hnaloan Budden	12	SR	12	Tom Mencinksy
Mickael Goudemand	13	LF	13	Victor Tereszko
Eloi Pelissier	14	IN	14	Yaroslav Davydov
Tiaki Chan	15	IN	15	Vitalii Puchkov
Hugo Salabio	16	IN	16	Yevhen Checheta
Justin Sangare	17	IN	17	Valentyn Korchak
Laurent Frayssinous		Coach		Dan Beardshaw

=== Third-place playoff ===
The third-place playoff formed part of the tournament but had no bearing on qualification.

26 October 2024
17:00 CEST (UTC+02:00)

Ukraine	10–50	Serbia
Tries: Vedler, Skorbach; Goals: Jannissen (0/1), Skorbach (1/1)	1st: 0–22; 2nd: 10–28; Report	Tries: Popovic, Pavlovic (2), N. Cotric (2), I. Cotric, Nofoaluma, Jankovic, O'Meley; Goals: Soric (6/7), O'Meley (1/2)

Stade Municipal, Saint-Estève
Referee: Mo Drizza (France)

Team details
Ukraine		Position	Serbia
Name	Number	Position	Number	Name
Yevhhen Davydov	1	FB	1	David Nofoaluma
Tigris Polata	2	WG	2	Rajko Trifunovic
Mykhailo Troian	3	CE	3	Nikola Cotic
Vitali Puchov	4	CE	4	Aleksandar Pavlovic
Danylo Vedler	5	WG	5	Andrej Mora
Oleksandr Skorbach	6	SO	6	Nick O'Meley
Daniel Jannissen	7	SH	7	Jesse Soric
Volodymyr Karpenko	8	PR	8	Jake O'Meley
Dmytro Semerenko	9	HK	9	Sasha Popovic
Oleksandr Syvokoz	10	PF	10	Enis Bibic
Jonah Ngaronoa	11	SR	11	Ilija Cotric
Yevhenii Trusov	12	SR	12	Nikola Djuric
Tom Menchinksy	13	LF	13	Stevan Stevanovic
Valentyn Korchak	14	IN	14	Vuk Štrbac
Yaroslav Davydov	15	IN	15	Milos Calic
Yevhen Checheta	16	IN	16	Marko Jankovic
Oleksandr Shcherbyna	17	IN	17	Jason Muranka
Dan Beardshaw		Coach		Darren Fisher

=== Final ===
26 October 2024
14:30 CEST (UTC+02:00)

Wales	6–48	France
Tries: Williams; Goals: Fozard (1/1)	1st: 6–20; 2nd: 0–28; Report	Tries: Romano, Rouge (2), Franco, Pelissier, Sangare, Fages, Belmas, Chan; Goals: Rouge (6/9)

Stade Municipal, Saint-Estève
Attendance: 2,150
Referee: Aaron Moore (England)

Team details
Wales		Position	France
Name	Number	Position	Number	Name
Billy Walkley	1	FB	1	Cesar Rouge
Joe Coope-Franklin	2	WG	2	Hakim Miloudi
Mike Butt	3	CE	3	Arthur Romano
Will Evans	4	CE	4	Mathieu Laguerre
Rhys Williams	5	WG	5	Romain Franco
Elliot Kear	6	SO	6	Ugo Tison
Josh Ralph	7	SH	7	Theo Fages
Huw Worthington	8	PR	8	Lambert Belmas
Matthew Fozard	9	HK	9	Alrix Da Costa
Ben Evans	10	PF	10	Tiaki Chan
Connor Davies	11	SR	11	Maxime Stefani
Matt Ross	12	SR	12	Mathieu Cozza
Sam Bowring	13	LF	13	Mickael Goudemand
Curtis Davies	14	IN	14	Eloi Pelissier
Anthony Walker	15	IN	15	Justin Sangare
Ashton Robinson	16	IN	16	Clement Boyer
Sam Grice	17	IN	17	Anthony Marion
Mark Moxon		Coach		Laurent Frayssinous
