= Joseph Coope-Franklin =

Wales international rugby league & union footballer

Joe Coope-Franklin
Personal information
- Full name: Joseph Coope-Franklin
- Born: 19 November 2001 (age 24) Oakdale, Caerphilly, Wales

Playing information

Rugby league
- Position: Centre
Club
Years	Team	Pld	T	G	FG	P
2022–24	Salford Red Devils	2	0	0	0	0
2024–	Rochdale Hornets	2	0	0	0	0
	Total	4	0	0	0	0
Representative
Years	Team	Pld	T	G	FG	P
2024	Wales	2	1	0	0	4

Rugby union
- Position: back row
Club
Years	Team	Pld	T	G	FG	P
2022–23	Preston Grasshoppers R.F.C.		0	0	0	0
- Source: As of 27 October 2024

Joseph Coope-Franklin is a Welsh professional rugby league player who plays as wing and centre for Rochdale Hornets.

== Playing career ==
=== Salford Red Devils ===
In September 2022 Coope-Franklin made his Salford debut in the Super League against the Warrington Wolves.

=== Rochdale Hornets ===
On 16 Nov 2023 it was reported that he had signed for Rochdale Hornets in the RFL League 1

== International ==
On 22 Oct 2024 he made his debut for Wales v Serbia scoring his first international try. On 27 Oct 2024 he made his second appearance Wales v France in the final of the European qualifying tournament
