= Stade Municipal (Saint-Estève) =

Rugby stadium in Saint-Esteve, France

- Interactive map of Stade Municipal
- Full name: Stade Municipal Saint-Estève
- Location: Rue Joliot-Curie, 66240 Saint-Estève, France
- Coordinates: 42.7094°N 2.8431°E
- Capacity: 6,000 (2,000 seated)
- Surface: Grass
- Field size: 102m x 73m

Construction
- Opened: 1965
- Renovated: 1985

Tenants
- AS Saint-Estève (1965–2000); Union Treiziste Catalane (2000–2006); Saint-Estève XIII Mavericks (2000–present); Saint-Estève XIII Catalan (2006–present)

Stade Municipal or Stade Saint-Estève as it is sometimes known, is a rugby stadium in Saint-Estève a suburb of Perpignan. It is the current home of Saint-Estève XIII Catalan who play in the Super XIII in France, as well as National Division 2 side Saint-Estève XIII Mavericks. The stadium has a 6,000 capacity with 2,000 of these seated.

== History ==
Built in 1965 for the use of new rugby league club AS Saint-Estève the stadium then as now has two stands along the side of the pitch with open ends behind the sticks with a perimeter fence and floodlights. In 1985 the ground received a refurbishment which included the building of a fitness room along with new changing rooms. When AS Saint-Estève merged with XIII Catalan the new club Union Treiziste Catalane or as they were also known UTC played some matches at the ground over the next six years. In 2005 in the British rugby league Challenge Cup UTC beat Hull Kingston Rovers 32-18 in front of a crowd of 3,000. From 2014 the stadium became the regular home ground for Saint-Estève XIII Catalan. In 2015 it hosted its first international game when France beat Serbia 68-8.

== Rugby League Internationals ==
Date	Teams	Score	Attendance	Tournament
22 May 2015	France v Serbia	68-8		Friendly
