= Rugby league in Argentina =

Rugby league is a minor team sport that has been played in Argentina since 2005. After a lengthy hiatus, Argentina played a domestic game on 7 November 2015. Argentina hosted the first Latin-American rugby league tournament on 10 November 2016.

== History ==
Argentina first started to play rugby league in 2005 when the Australian Police rugby league team toured Buenos Aires. The Australian Police played two fixtures winning on both occasions, the first 40-4 and the second 60–6 with around 400 spectators watching both games.

In 2006, four teams took part in a Rugby League 9s tournament in Buenos Aires, however the sport then disappeared from the country.

As of 2015, the new Governing Body is Confederacion Argentina de Rugby League.

On 7 November 2015 two domestic teams played as the curtain-raiser of a soccer match in Miramar.

On 10 November 2016, the first Latin-American Rugby League tournament took place in the city of Miramar. Argentina presented 3 teams: Argentina National "Boars", Argentina Provincial "Mustangs" and the Buenos Aires selection "Wild Ducks". These teams played against the Chile selection and the Latin Heat domestic selection. The Argentina National "Boars" won the final against Chile.

In November 2017 the Sudamericano Rugby League Tournament will be in Santiago de Chile, where Argentina will bring their team.

== Governing body ==
The Confederación Argentina de Rugby League was formed in 2015.
