= 2024 Penrith Panthers season =

Sporting team, Penrith Panther 2022 NRL season

- 2024 NRL premiers
- NRL Rank: 2nd (Premiers)
- 2024 record: Wins: 17; losses: 7
- Points scored: For: 580; against: 394

Team information
- CEO: Matt Cameron (PDRLFC); Brian Fletcher (Panthers Group)
- Coach: Ivan Cleary
- Captain: Nathan Cleary & Isaah Yeo
- Stadium: BlueBet Stadium – 22,500; Carrington Park – 13,000 (round 7 only)
- Avg. attendance: 19,497
- High attendance: 21,525

Top scorers
- Tries: Sunia Turuva (17)
- Goals: Nathan Cleary (50)
- Points: Nathan Cleary (118)
← 2023	List of seasons	2025 →

The 2024 Penrith Panthers season was the 58th season in the club's history. They were Coached by Ivan Cleary and co-captained by Nathan Cleary and Isaah Yeo, the Panthers were competing in the National Rugby League's 2024 Telstra Premiership. The Panthers won the 2024 Premiership by defeating the Melbourne Storm in the Final (14–6). This marked their 4th premiership in a row.

== Squad ==
Penrith Panthers 2024 squad
Top 30 squad - 2024 NRL Season			Supplementary list	Coaching staff
Paul Alamoti – CE, WG; Nathan Cleary (c) – HB; Jack Cole – FE; Dylan Edwards (vc) – FB; Matthew Eisenhuth – LK; James Fisher-Harris (vc) – PR; Luke Garner – SR; Mavrik Geyer – SR; Harrison Hassett – SR; Liam Henry – PR, SR	Mitch Kenny – HK; Daine Laurie – FB; Moses Leota – PR; Jarome Luai – FE, HB; Soni Luke – HK; Liam Martin – SR; Jesse McLean – WG; Tyrone Peachey – CE	Preston Riki – PR; Brad Schneider – HB; Lindsay Smith – PR, LK; Scott Sorensen – SR; Izack Tago – CE; Brian To'o – WG; Sunia Turuva – WG; Isaah Yeo (c) – LK	Riley Price – LK; Billy Scott – HK; Luke Sommerton – HK; Extended squad: Casey McLean – CE; Luron Patea – PR; Trent Toelau – HB	Head coach: Ivan Cleary; Assistant coaches: Ben Gardiner; Peter Wallace; Ben Harden (NSW Cup Coach); Jono Rolfe (Jersey Flegg Cup Coach); Legend: (c) Captain(s); (vc) Vice-captain(s); Updated: 13 November 2023; Source(s): Panthers team profiles

=== Player transfers ===
A † denotes that the transfer occurred during the 2024 season.

Gains
Player	Signed from	Until end of	Notes
Paul Alamoti	Canterbury Bankstown Bulldogs	2024	
Asu Kepaoa†	Wests Tigers	2025	
Daine Laurie	Wests Tigers	2024	
Riley Price	North Queensland Cowboys	2025	
Brad Schneider	Hull Kingston Rovers (Super League)	2025	

Losses
Player	Signed to	Until end of	Notes
Stephen Crichton	Canterbury Bankstown Bulldogs	2027	
Jaeman Salmon	Canterbury Bankstown Bulldogs	2025	
Spencer Leniu	Sydney Roosters	2025	
Jack Cogger	Newcastle Knights	2026	
Tom Jenkins	Newcastle Knights	2025	
Zac Hosking	Canberra Raiders	2026	
Kurt Falls	Brisbane Broncos		
Eddie Blacker	Norths Devils (Queensland Cup)		
Chris Smith	Released		
Ativalu Lisati†	Melbourne Storm	2025	
Taylan May†	Released		

== Fixtures ==
=== World Club Challenge ===
Date	Opponent	Venue	Score	Tries	Goals	Attendance
24 February; 20:00 (GMT)	Wigan Warriors	DW Stadium	16 - 12	Cleary, Edwards	Cleary (2/2)	24,091
Legend: Win Loss Draw

=== Regular season ===
==== Results by round ====
Round	1	2	3	4	5	6	7	8	9	10	11	12	13	14	15	16	17	18	19	20	21	22	23	24	25	26	27
Ground	A	H	H	A	A	–	H	A	A	H	N	A	H	H	A	–	H	A	–	H	A	H	A	H	A	H	H
Result	L	W	W	W	L	B	W	W	W	W	L	W	L	W	W	B	L	W	B	W	W	W	W	L	L	W	W
Position	11	10	4	2	8	6	4	3	3	2	3	2	3	3	2	2	2	2	2	2	2	2	2	2	4	2	2
Points	0	2	4	6	6	8	10	12	14	16	16	18	18	20	22	24	24	26	28	30	32	34	36	36	36	38	40

Source: National Rugby League
A = Away; H = Home; N = Neutral; B = Bye; W = Win; D = Draw; L = Loss

==== Matches ====
Date	Round	Opponent	Venue	Score	Tries	Goals	Attendance
Friday, 8 March	1	Melbourne Storm	AAMI Park	8–0			20,169
Friday, 15 March	2	Parramatta Eels	BlueBet Stadium	26–18	Edwards, Leota, Turuva (2), Tago	Cleary (3/5)	21,522
Thursday, 21 March	3	Brisbane Broncos	BlueBet Stadium	34–12	Turuva, Tago (2), Kenny, To'o (2)	Cleary (5/6)	20,089
Thursday, 28 March	4	Sydney Roosters	Allianz Stadium	16–22	Turuva (3), Edwards	Edwards (3/5)	25,898
Saturday, 6 April	5	Manly Warringah Sea Eagles	4 Pines Park	32–18	Schneider, Edwards (2)	Edwards (3/3)	17,381
	6	Bye					
Saturday, 20 April	7	Wests Tigers	Carrington Park	22–6	Turuva (2), Alamoti, Fisher-Harris	Edwards (3/4)	12,000
Saturday, 27 April	8	North Queensland Cowboys	Queensland Country Bank Stadium	20–26	To'o, Edwards, Alamoti, Martin	Cleary (5/5)	20,960
Thursday, 2 May	9	South Sydney Rabbitohs	Accor Stadium	12–42	Turuva, Schneider, Garner (2), Smith, May, Tago	Edwards (7/7)	8,155
Friday, 10 May	10	Canterbury-Bankstown Bulldogs	BlueBet Stadium	16–10	Garner, To'o	Cleary (1/1), Edwards (4/4)	21,525
Sunday, 19 May	11	New Zealand Warriors	Suncorp Stadium	22–20	Edwards, Luai, Yeo, Tago	Edwards (2/5)	40,472*
Saturday, 25 May	12	Cronulla-Sutherland Sharks	PointsBet Stadium	0–42	Fisher-Harris, Luai, Alamoti, Edwards, Cole, Henry, Sorensen	Edwards (7/8)	13,500
Saturday, 1 June	13	St George Illawarra Dragons	BlueBet Stadium	10–22	Alamoti, J. McLean	Alamoti (1/2)	12,025
Sunday, 9 June	14	Manly Warringah Sea Eagles	BlueBet Stadium	32–22	To'o (3), Turuva (2), Henry	Alamoti (4/7)	20,101
Sunday, 16 June	15	Newcastle Knights	McDonald Jones Stadium	18–26	Sorensen, To'o, Luai, Smith, Edwards	Alamoti (3/5)	27,966
	16	Bye					
Sunday, 30 June	17	North Queensland Cowboys	BlueBet Stadium	6–16	Schneider	Alamoti (1/1)	15,777
Friday, 5 July	18	Brisbane Broncos	Suncorp Stadium	6–14	Cole, To'o, Kenny	Edwards (1/3)	42,433
	19	Bye					
Sunday, 21 July	20	Dolphins	BlueBet Stadium	28–26	Turuva, Alamoti, Leota, Laurie	Cleary (5/5) 1 2pt FG	20,955
Sunday, 28 July	21	St George Illawarra Dragons	WIN Stadium	10–46	C. McLean, Martin, Cleary (3), Sorensen, Smith, Toelau	Cleary (7/8)	18,988
Sunday, 4 August	22	Newcastle Knights	BlueBet Stadium	22–14	C. McLean, Tago, Cleary	Cleary (5/5)	20,261
Friday, 9 August	23	Parramatta Eels	CommBank Stadium	34–36	To'o (2), Tago (2), Turuva (2)	Cleary (6/7)	18,852
Thursday, 15 August	24	Melbourne Storm	BlueBet Stadium	22–24	Smith, Tago, Edwards, C. McLean	Cleary (3/5)	20,516
Saturday, 24 August	25	Canberra Raiders	GIO Stadium Canberra	22–18	Sommerton, Laurie, Fisher-Harris	Edwards (3/4)	17,523
Friday, 30 August	26	South Sydney Rabbitohs	BlueBet Stadium	34–12	Fisher-Harris, Garner, Schneider, Turuva, Yeo	Alamoti (5/6)	20,176
Saturday, 7 September	27	Gold Coast Titans	Penrith Park	18–12	To'o, Edwards, Garner	Alamoti (3/4)	21,525
Legend: Win Loss Draw Bye

- Indicates the total attendance for magic round day 3.

== Ladder ==
Pos	Team	Pld	W	D	L	B	PF	PA	PD	Pts	Qualification
1	Melbourne Storm	24	19	0	5	3	692	449	+243	44	Advance to finals series
2	Penrith Panthers (P)	24	17	0	7	3	580	394	+186	40	Advance to finals series
3	Sydney Roosters	24	16	0	8	3	738	463	+275	38	Advance to finals series
4	Cronulla-Sutherland Sharks	24	16	0	8	3	653	431	+222	38	Advance to finals series
5	North Queensland Cowboys	24	15	0	9	3	657	568	+89	36	Advance to finals series
6	Canterbury-Bankstown Bulldogs	24	14	0	10	3	529	433	+96	34	Advance to finals series
7	Manly Warringah Sea Eagles	24	13	1	10	3	634	521	+113	33	Advance to finals series
8	Newcastle Knights	24	12	0	12	3	470	510	−40	30	Advance to finals series
9	Canberra Raiders	24	12	0	12	3	474	601	−127	30	
10	Dolphins	24	11	0	13	3	577	578	−1	28	
11	St. George Illawarra Dragons	24	11	0	13	3	508	634	−126	28	
12	Brisbane Broncos	24	10	0	14	3	537	607	−70	26	
13	New Zealand Warriors	24	9	1	14	3	512	574	−62	25	
14	Gold Coast Titans	24	8	0	16	3	488	656	−168	22	
15	Parramatta Eels	24	7	0	17	3	561	716	−155	20	
16	South Sydney Rabbitohs	24	7	0	17	3	494	682	−188	20	
17	Wests Tigers	24	6	0	18	3	463	750	−287	18	

Source: National Rugby League
(P) Premiers

=== Bracket ===
Qualifying and elimination finals
14 September – Melbourne
1	Melbourne	37
4	Cronulla-Sutherland	10
14 September – Townsville
5	North Queensland	28
8	Newcastle	16
15 September – Sydney
6	Canterbury-Bankstown	22
7	Manly Warringah	24
13 September – Sydney
2	Penrith	30
3	Sydney	10

Semi-finals
20 September – Sydney
Cronulla-Sutherland	26
North Queensland	18
21 September – Sydney
Sydney	40
Manly Warringah	16

Preliminary finals
27 September – Melbourne
Melbourne	48
Sydney	18
28 September – Sydney
Penrith	26
Cronulla-Sutherland	6

Grand final
6 October – Sydney
Melbourne	6
Penrith	14

Date	Round	Opponent	Venue	Score	Tries	Goals	Attendance
Friday, 13 September	Qualifying Final	Sydney Roosters	BlueBet Stadium	30 - 10	To'o, Tago, Luai, Garner (2)	Cleary (5/6)	21,483
Saturday, 28 September	Preliminary Final	Cronulla Sharks	Accor Stadium	26 - 6	Alamoti (2), To'o, Martin	Cleary (4/5), Alamoti (1/1)	33,753
Sunday, 6 October	Grand Final	Melbourne Storm	Accor Stadium	6 - 14	Turuva, Martin, Alamoti	Cleary (1/3)	80,156

== Other teams ==
In addition to competing in the National Rugby League, the Panthers also fielded semi-professional teams in the 2024 Jersey Flegg Cup (for players aged under 21) and the New South Wales Rugby League's The Knock-On Effect NSW Cup (NSW Cup).
