= 2025 Penrith Panthers season =

- NRL Rank: 7th
- 2025 record: Wins: 13; losses: 10
- Points scored: For: 576; against: 469

Team information
- CEO: Brian Fletcher
- Coach: (Australia) Ivan Cleary
- Captain: (Australia) Nathan Cleary (Australia) Isaah Yeo
- Stadium: CommBank Stadium
- Avg. attendance: 19,496
← 2024	List of seasons	2026 →

The 2025 Penrith Panthers season was the 59th season in the club's history. Coached by Ivan Cleary and co-captained by Nathan Cleary and Isaah Yeo, the Panthers competed in the National Rugby League's 2025 Telstra Premiership.

Penrith played at CommBank Stadium in Parramatta for their home fixtures, due to renovations at their usual home ground, Penrith Stadium.

== Squad ==
Penrith Panthers 2026 squad
Top 30 squad - 2026 NRL season			Supplementary list	Coaching staff
Paul Alamoti – WG; Tom Ale – PR; Nathan Cleary (c) – HB; Jack Cogger – HB, FE; Jack Cole – FE; Jaxen Edgar – FB; Dylan Edwards (vc) – FB; Sione Fonua – CE; Luke Garner – SR	Kalani Going – SR; Liam Henry – PR, SR; Tom Jenkins – WG; Mitch Kenny (vc) – HK; Moses Leota – PR; Freddy Lussick – HK; Liam Martin – SR; Casey McLean – CE; Jesse McLean – WG; Isaiah Papali'i – SR	Luron Patea – PR; Billy Scott – HK; Lindsay Smith – PR; Scott Sorensen – SR; Izack Tago – CE; Blaize Talagi – FE; Brian To'o – WG; Isaah Yeo (c) – LK	Billy Phillips – LK	Head coach: Ivan Cleary; Assistant coaches: Peter Wallace; Ben Harden; Jono Rolfe (Pathways Coach); Matt Eisenhuth (NSW Cup Coach); Scott Thompson (Jersey Flegg Cup Coach); Legend: (c) Captain(s); (vc) Vice-captain(s); Updated: 17 April 2026; Source(s): Panthers team profiles

=== Player transfers ===
Gains
Player	Signed from	Until end of	Ref.
Isaiah Papali'i	Wests Tigers	2027	
Blaize Talagi	Parramatta Eels	2027	

Losses
Player	Signed to	Until end of	Ref.
Jarome Luai	Wests Tigers	2029	
Sunia Turuva	Wests Tigers	2027	
James Fisher-Harris	New Zealand Warriors	2028	
Isaiah Iongi	Parramatta Eels	2027	
Tyrone Peachey	Retired		

== World Club Challenge ==
Ahead of the 2024 NRL Grand Final, reports began circulating that the 2025 World Club Challenge would be at risk of being cancelled as teams that could potentially qualify (Penrith Panthers, Warrington Wolves, and Wigan Warriors) would have difficulty arranging travel to either the UK or Australia, then to the United States, with the usual date of the tournament being close to that of the 2025 Rugby League Las Vegas event. Following Penrith's victory in the Grand Final, thus qualification for the tournament, it was revealed that 15 or 16 February would be the latest they would play the tournament, leaving time for travel back to Australia then out to the United States, while also maximising their pre-season, citing player welfare as in issue. However, with this weekend being the opening weekend of the 2025 Super League season, the date was unlikely.

On 9 October 2024, Penrith confirmed to the NRL that they would not play the match before the start of the domestic seasons citing player welfare as the issue stating that their players were delaying their mandated leave to play in the 2024 Rugby League Pacific Championships and 2024 Samoa rugby league tour of England thus not allowing players to have an adequate preseason before the World Club Challenge. The club stated that it was open to working with the NRL for a solution to play the match, but would not as things stand currently.

Following the conclusion of the 2024 Super League Grand Final, Wigan Warriors captain Liam Farrell confirmed the champions' commitment to the 2025 World Club Challenge and stated that the club would be working to ensure the game goes ahead. These words later confirmed by CEO Kris Radlinski.

On 16 October, Radlinski contacted the NRL and Penrith about playing the game during Magic Round (requiring the NRL to schedule one of Penrith's byes for this round), an idea proposed on social media by Penrith's Nathan Cleary two days prior. However this idea never came to fruition with Penrith facing Brisbane in Magic Round.

Date and time	Versus	H/A	Venue	Result	Score	Tries	Goals	Attendance	TV	Report
Not scheduled	Penrith Panthers	H (Note: The match was never officially scheduled however 2025 would have been the NRL Champion's turn to host.)	Western Sydney Stadium (Note: Penrith played the 2025 season at the Western Sydney Stadium with their home ground, Penrith Stadium, undergoing redevelopment.)	Cancelled	N/A					

Wigan remain world champions by virtue of their victory in the competition in 2024, however did not receive a separate title for 2025 in lieu of Penrith's withdrawal.

== Regular season ==
=== Ladder ===
Pos	Team	Pld	W	D	L	B	PF	PA	PD	Pts	Qualification
1	Canberra Raiders	24	19	0	5	3	654	506	+148	44	Advance to finals series
2	Melbourne Storm	24	17	0	7	3	671	459	+212	40	Advance to finals series
3	Canterbury-Bankstown Bulldogs	24	16	0	8	3	534	414	+120	38	Advance to finals series
4	Brisbane Broncos (P)	24	15	0	9	3	680	508	+172	36	Advance to finals series
5	Cronulla-Sutherland Sharks	24	15	0	9	3	599	490	+109	36	Advance to finals series
6	New Zealand Warriors	24	14	0	10	3	517	496	+21	34	Advance to finals series
7	Penrith Panthers	24	13	1	10	3	576	469	+107	33	Advance to finals series
8	Sydney Roosters	24	13	0	11	3	653	521	+132	32	Advance to finals series
9	Dolphins	24	12	0	12	3	721	596	+125	30	
10	Manly Warringah Sea Eagles	24	12	0	12	3	555	534	+21	30	
11	Parramatta Eels	24	10	0	14	3	502	578	−76	26	
12	North Queensland Cowboys	24	9	1	14	3	538	684	−146	25	
13	Wests Tigers	24	9	0	15	3	477	612	−135	24	
14	South Sydney Rabbitohs	24	9	0	15	3	427	608	−181	24	
15	St. George Illawarra Dragons	24	8	0	16	3	498	628	−130	22	
16	Gold Coast Titans	24	6	0	18	3	520	719	−199	18	
17	Newcastle Knights	24	6	0	18	3	338	638	−300	18	

Source: National Rugby League
(P) Premiers

=== Results by round ===
Round	1	2	3	4	5	6	7	8	9	10	11	12	13	14	15	16	17	18	19	20	21	22	23	24	25	26	27
Ground	H	H	A	A	H	A	A	H	H	A	–	H	H	A	–	A	H	–	A	H	H	A	A	H	H	A	A
Result	W	L	L	L	L	L	W	L	W	D	B	L	W	W	B	W	W	B	W	W	W	W	W	L	L	L	W
Position	6	10	12	13	15	16	15	17	15	16	13	17	15	13	9	8	7	6	6	6	5	5	4	5	7	7	7
Points	2	2	2	2	2	2	4	4	6	7	9	9	11	13	15	17	19	21	23	25	27	29	31	31	31	31	33

Source: National Rugby League
A = Away; H = Home; N = Neutral; B = Bye; W = Win; D = Draw; L = Loss

=== Matches ===
The league fixtures were released on 21 November, 2024.

Win Draw Loss Fixtures

Date	Round	Opponent	Venue	Score	Tries	Goals	Attendance
Sunday, 2 March	1	Cronulla Sharks	Allegiant Stadium	28–22	Isaah Yeo, Izack Tago, Daine Laurie (2) Paul Alamoti	Cleary (4/5)	45,209
Friday, 14 March	2	Sydney Roosters	CommBank Stadium	32–38	Paul Alamoti, Brian To’o, Liam Henry, Dylan Edwards, Casey McLean	Cleary (4/5)	12,180
Thursday, 20 March	3	Melbourne Storm	AAMI Park	30–24	Paul Alamoti (2) Casey McLean, Brian To’o (2)	Alamoti (2/5)	17,586
Thursday, 27 March	4	South Sydney Rabbitohs	Accor Stadium	28–18	Liam Martin, Brad Schneider, Jack Cole	Alamoti (3/3)	10,029
Friday, 4 April	5	North Queensland Cowboys	CommBank Stadium	18–22	Casey McLean, Izack Tago, Luke Garner	Cleary (3/3)	10,320
Thursday, 10 April	6	Dolphins	Suncorp Stadium	30–12	Casey McLean, Moses Leota	Cleary (2/2)	19,103
Saturday, 19 April	7	Sydney Roosters	Allianz Stadium	12–40	Paul Alamoti (2) Isaiah Papali'i, Blaize Talagi, Dylan Edwards, Casey McLean	Cleary (6/6), PG: Cleary (1/1), Alamoti (1/1)	20,373
Saturday, 26 April	8	Manly Sea Eagles	CommBank Stadium	10–26	Blaize Talagi, Izack Tago	Cleary (1/2)	14,534
Sunday, 4 May	9	Brisbane Broncos	Suncorp Stadium	32–8	Izack Tago, Luron Patea, Nathan Cleary, Thomas Jenkins (2)	Cleary (5/5)	50,309
Saturday, 10 May	10	North Queensland Cowboys	Queensland Country Bank Stadium	30–30 (g.p.)	Isaiah Papali'i, Luke Garner (2), Thomas Jenkins, Blaize Talagi	Cleary (5/5)	19,324
	11	Bye					
Saturday, 24 May	12	Newcastle Knights	Carrington Park	6–25	Harrison Hassett	Alamoti (1/1)	12,000
Sunday, 1 June	13	Parramatta Eels	CommBank Stadium	18–10	Casey McLean, Thomas Jenkins, Brian To’o	Cleary (3/3)	21,282
Sunday, 8 June	14	Wests Tigers	CommBank Stadium	14–18	Thomas Jenkins (3)	Cleary (2/3), PG: Cleary (1/1)	17,708
	15	Bye					
Saturday, 21 June	16	New Zealand Warriors	Go Media Stadium	18–28	Thomas Jenkins, Scott Sorensen (2), Blaize Talagi, Paul Alamoti	Alamoti	25,012
Thursday, 26 June	17	Canterbury Bankstown Bulldogs	CommBank Stadium	8–6	Nathan Cleary	Edwards (1/1) PG: Edwards (1/2)	16,738
	18	Bye					
Sunday, 13 July	19	Parramatta Eels	CommBank Stadium	32–10	Thomas Jenkins, Luke Garner, Izack Tago, Paul Alamoti, Nathan Cleary, Lindsay Smith	Alamoti (3/6) PG: Alamoti (1/1)	22,792
Friday, 18 July	20	South Sydney Rabbitohs	CommBank Stadium	30–10	Paul Alamoti, Dylan Edwards (2), Casey Mclean (2)	Edwards (5/5)	11,836
Saturday, 26 July	21	Wests Tigers	CommBank Stadium	36–2	Lindsay Smith, Casey Mclean, Dylan Edwards, Liam Martin, Izack Tago, Thomas Jenkins	Cleary (6/6)	16,753
Saturday, 2 August	22	Gold Coast Titans	Cbus Super Stadium	30–26	Thomas Jenkins, Dylan Edwards, Blaize Talagi, (2), Casey Mclean	Cleary (4/4)	18,174
Friday, 8 August	23	Newcastle Knights	McDonald Jones Stadium	48–12	Luke Garner, Lindsay Smith, Liam Henry, Brian To'o, Thomas Jenkins, Casey Mclean (2), Isaiah Papali'i, Izack Tago	Cleary (6/9)	20,197
Thursday, 14 August	24	Melbourne Storm	CommBank Stadium	18–22	Isaiah Papali'i, Nathan Cleary, Scott Sorenson	Cleary (2/3) PG: Cleary (1/1)	12,869
Friday, 22 August	25	Canberra Raiders	Glen Willow Oval	16–20	Casey Mclean (2), Liam Martin	Cleary (2/3)	9,925
Thursday, 28 August	26	Canterbury Bankstown Bulldogs	Accor Stadium	4–28	Paul Alamoti	Alamoti (0/1)	23,597
Saturday, 6 September	27	St. George Illawarra Dragons	WIN Stadium	40–20	Thomas Jenkins, Paul Alamoti (2), Casey Mclean, Nathan Cleary, Isaiah Papali'i, Lindsay Smith	Cleary (6/7)	17,442
Legend: Win Loss Draw Bye

== Other teams ==
In addition to competing in the National Rugby League, the Panthers are also fielding semi-professional teams in the 2025 Jersey Flegg Cup (for players aged under 21) and the NSW Cup.
