= 2023 Penrith Panthers season =

Sporting team, Penrith Panther 2023 NRL season

- 2023 NRL premiers
- NRL Rank: 1st (Premiers)
- 2023 record: Wins: 21; draws: 0; losses: 6
- Points scored: For: 645; against: 312

Team information
- CEO: Matt Cameron (PDRLFC); Brian Fletcher (Panthers Group)
- Coach: Ivan Cleary
- Captain: Nathan Cleary & Isaah Yeo
- Stadium: BlueBet Stadium – 22,500; Carrington Park – 13,000 (Round 9 only)
- Avg. attendance: 19,575
- High attendance: 21,525

Top scorers
- Tries: Brian To'o (21)
- Goals: Nathan Cleary (89)
- Points: Nathan Cleary (216)
← 2022	List of seasons	2024 →

The 2023 Penrith Panthers season was the 57th season in the club's history. With head coach Ivan Cleary and co-captains Nathan Cleary and Isaah Yeo, the Panthers competed in the National Rugby League's 2023 Telstra Premiership and won the minor premiership.

== 20th anniversary ==
In 2023, it was the twentieth anniversary of the Penrith Panthers' 2003 NRL Grand Final win against the Sydney Roosters. This was Penrith's second premiership.

== Jerseys and sponsors ==
The 2023 home, away and alternate jerseys looked similar to the ones shown below

Home

Away

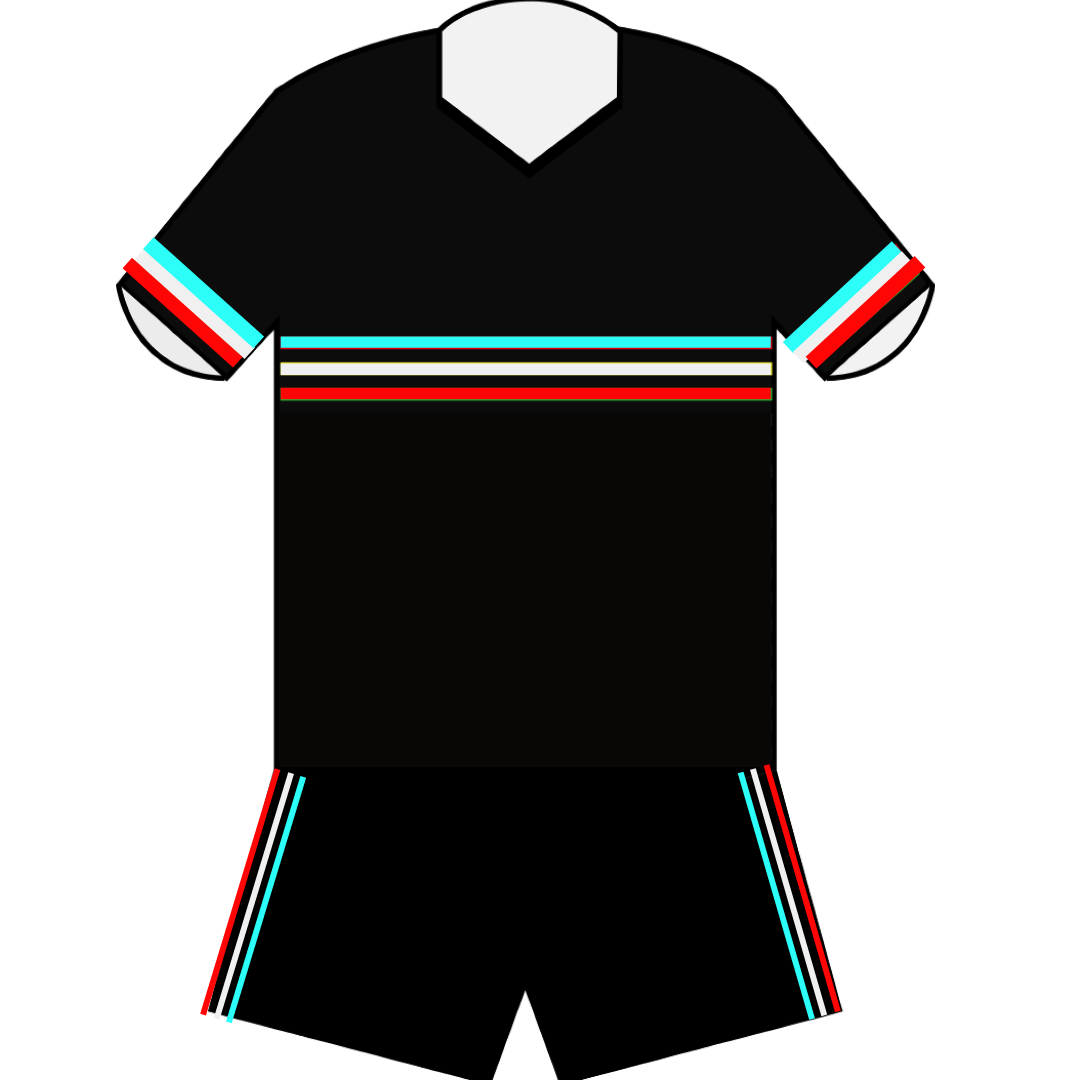
Alternate

=== Sponsors ===
Main sponsor	Kit supplier	Minor sponsors
Jersey
OAK Plus	O'Neills	Bluestone Home Loans
OAK Plus	O'Neills	Hertz
OAK Plus	O'Neills	KFC
OAK Plus	O'Neills	Allam Property Group
Shorts
Turner Freeman Lawyers	O'Neills	KFC
Turner Freeman Lawyers	O'Neills	Instyle Solar
Training Shirt & Shorts
OAK Plus	O'Neills	MKJ Projects
OAK Plus	O'Neills	Hertz
OAK Plus	O'Neills	KFC
OAK Plus	O'Neills	Instyle Solar
OAK Plus	O'Neills	Turner Freeman Lawyers

== Squad ==
No	Nat	Player	1st Position	2nd Position	NRL Games	Previous 1st Grade Club
536	(Australia)	Tyrone Peachey	Lock	Centre	207	Wests Tigers
537	(Australia)	Isaah Yeo (c)	Lock	Second Row	220	None
553	(Australia)	Chris Smith	Second Row	Lock	39	Canterbury-Bankstown Bulldogs
557	(New Zealand)	James Fisher-Harris (vc)	Prop		180	None
560	(Australia)	Nathan Cleary (c)	Halfback		159	None
562	(New Zealand)	Moses Leota	Prop		149	None
564	(Australia)	Dylan Edwards (vc)	Fullback		131	None
579	(Samoa)	Jarome Luai	Five-Eighth		107	None
584	(Australia)	Liam Martin	Second Row		104	None
585	(Samoa)	Brian To'o	Wing		93	None
586	(Australia)	Mitch Kenny	Hooker	Lock	83	None
589	(Samoa)	Stephen Crichton	Centre		100	None
591	(Samoa)	Spencer Leniu	Prop		83	None
598	(Australia)	Matt Eisenhuth	Lock	Prop	116	Wests Tigers
599	(New Zealand)	Scott Sorensen	Second Row	Lock	105	Cronulla-Sutherland Sharks
601	(Australia)	Jaeman Salmon	Second Row	Centre	61	Parramatta Eels
602	(Australia)	Lindsay Smith	Prop	Lock	27	None
603	(Samoa)	Izack Tago	Centre		48	None
604	(Samoa)	Taylan May	Wing		22	None
607	(Tonga)	Soni Luke	Hooker		24	None
609	(Fiji)	Sunia Turuva	Fullback	Wing	29	None
610	(Australia)	Tom Jenkins	Centre	Wing	6	None
612	(Australia)	Jack Cole	Centre		1	None
613	(Australia)	Eddie Blacker	Prop		2	St. George Illawarra Dragons
614	(Australia)	Luke Garner	Second Row	Centre	87	Wests Tigers
616	(Australia)	Jack Cogger	Five-Eighth	Halfback	55	Huddersfield Giants
615	(Australia)	Zac Hosking	Second Row	Lock	25	Brisbane Broncos
Development Players
608	(Australia)	Kurt Falls	Halfback	Five-eighth	3	None
611	(Australia)	Liam Henry	Prop	Lock	1	None
-	(Australia)	Mavrik Geyer	Prop	Second Row	????	????
-	(Australia)	Ativalu Lisati	Second Row	Lock	????	?????

== Fixtures ==
=== Pre-Season Challenge (week 1) ===
Date	Trial	Opponent	Venue	Score	Tries	Goals	Attendance
Saturday, 11 February	1	Parramatta Eels	BlueBet Stadium	22 - 16	Sommerton, Jenkins, McLean, Cohen	Kurt Falls (3/4)	3,525
Legend: Win Loss Draw

=== Pre-Season Challenge (week 2) / World Club Challenge ===
Date	Trial	Opponent	Venue	Score	Tries	Goals	Attendance
Saturday, 18 February	2	St Helens	BlueBet Stadium	12 - 13	Tago, To'o	Nathan Cleary (2/2)	13,873
Legend: Win Loss Draw

=== Regular season ===
Date	Round	Opponent	Venue	Score	Tries	Goals	Attendance
Friday, 3 March	1	Brisbane Broncos	BlueBet Stadium	12 - 13	Crichton, Luke	Cleary (2/2)	17,125
Thursday, 9 March	2	South Sydney Rabbitohs	BlueBet Stadium	16 - 10	Crichton, Tago, To'o	Crichton (1/1), Cleary (1/3)	16,906
	3	Bye					
Thursday, 23 March	4	Parramatta Eels	CommBank Stadium	17 - 16	Edwards, Hosking	Cleary (3/3) 1 2pt FG	16,342
Friday, 31 March	5	Canberra Raiders	GIO Stadium	12 - 53	Turuva (2), Tago (2), Cleary, Hosking, Peachey, Crichton, Salmon	Cleary (8/9) 1 FG	15,334
Saturday, 8 April	6	Manly-Warringah Sea Eagles	BlueBet Stadium	44 - 12	Edwards (4), To'o, Sorensen, Cleary	Cleary (8/8)	20,312
Saturday, 15 April	7	Newcastle Knights	McDonald Jones Stadium	15 - 16	To'o, Salmon	Cleary (3/4) 2 FG	26,084
Thursday, 20 April	8	South Sydney Rabbitohs	Accor Stadium	20 - 18	Crichton (3)	Crichton (3/4)	19,574
Saturday, 29 April	9	Wests Tigers	Carrington Park	8 - 12	Peachey	Crichton (2/2)	11,055
Saturday, 6 May	10	New Zealand Warriors	Suncorp Stadium	6 - 18	Edwards, To'o, Leniu	Cleary (3/4)	50,183*
Friday, 12 May	11	Sydney Roosters	BlueBet Stadium	48 - 4	Sorensen (2), Edwards, Peachey (2), To'o, Turuva, Luai	Cleary (8/8)	20,255
Thursday, 18 May	12	Brisbane Broncos	Suncorp Stadium	4 - 15	Turuva, Cleary	Cleary (3/3) 1 FG	33,343
	13	Bye					
Sunday, 4 June	14	St George Illawarra Dragons	BlueBet Stadium	26 - 18	To'o (2), Turuva, Leota	Cleary (1/1), Crichton (4/5)	16,912
Saturday, 10 June	15	Sydney Roosters	Allianz Stadium	6 - 30	Crichton, Edwards, Yeo, To'o, Tago	Crichton (5/6)	23,610
Friday, 16 June	16	North Queensland Cowboys	Queensland Country Bank Stadium	27 - 23	Tago (2), Salmon, Jenkins	Cogger (3/4) 1 FG	17,277
Saturday, 24 June	17	Newcastle Knights	BlueBet Stadium	20 - 12	Edwards, Peachey (2), Salmon	Cogger (2/4)	18,589
Friday, 30 June	18	Melbourne Storm	Marvel Stadium	16 - 34	Crichton, Tago (2), Martin, Hosking, To'o	Crichton (5/6)	26,829
	19	Bye					
Sunday, 16 July	20	Dolphins	Kayo Satdium	14 - 24	Leota, Tago (2), Jenkins	Cogger (1/4), Edwards (2/2)	10,065
Sunday, 23 July	21	Canterbury-Bankstown Bulldogs	BlueBet Stadium	44 - 18	Peachey (2), Yeo, To'o (2), Crichton, Sorenson, Garner	Cleary (6/8)	21,525
Saturday, 29 July	22	Cronulla Sharks	BlueBet Stadium	28 - 0	Luai, Yeo, To'o, Turuva, Martin	Cleary (4/5)	20,694
Friday, 4 August	23	Melbourne Storm	BlueBet Stadium	26 - 6	To'o (2), Luai, Crichton	Cleary (5/6)	19,953
Thursday, 10 August	24	Manly-Warringah Sea Eagles	4 Pines Park	12 - 24	Crichton (2), Turuva, To'o	Cleary (4/5)	10,102
Saturday, 19 August	25	Gold Coast Titans	Cbus Super Stadium	14 - 40	Edwards (2), Yeo, Peachey, Jenkins, Martin, Crichton	Cleary (6/7)	19,106
Thursday, 24 August	26	Parramatta Eels	BlueBet Stadium	18 - 32	Peachey, Cleary, Martin, Jenkins	Cleary (1/4)	21,525
Saturday, 2 September	27	North Queensland Cowboys	BlueBet Stadium	44 - 12	Crichton, Turuva (2), Martin, To'o (2), Sommerton, Cleary	Cleary (6/8)	21,525
Legend: Win Loss Draw Bye

- Round 10 attendance figure is for the whole of Magic Round day 2

=== Finals ===
Qualifying and elimination finals
9 September – Sydney
1	Penrith	32
4	New Zealand	6
10 September – Newcastle
5	Newcastle	30
8	Canberra	28
9 September – Sydney
6	Cronulla-Sutherland	12
7	Sydney	13
8 September – Brisbane
2	Brisbane	26
3	Melbourne	0

Semi-finals
16 September – Auckland
New Zealand	40
Newcastle	10
15 September – Melbourne
Melbourne	18
Sydney	13

Preliminary finals
22 September – Sydney
Penrith	38
Melbourne	4
23 September – Brisbane
Brisbane	42
New Zealand	12

Grand final
1 October – Sydney
Penrith	26
Brisbane	24

Date	Round	Opponent	Venue	Score	Tries	Goals	Attendance
Saturday, 9 September	Qualifying Final	New Zealand Warriors	BlueBet Stadium	32 - 6	To'o, Martin, Turuva (2), Cleary	Cleary (6/6)	21,525
Friday, 22 September	Preliminary Final	Melbourne Storm	Accor Stadium	38 - 4	To'o (3), Turuva, Cleary, Edwards	Cleary (7/8)	35,578
Sunday, 1 October	Grand Final	Brisbane Broncos	Accor Stadium	26 - 24	Kenny, Leota, Crichton, Cleary	Crichton (1/1), Cleary (4/4)	81,947

== Ladder ==
2023 NRL season
Pos	Team	Pld	W	D	L	B	PF	PA	PD	Pts
1	Penrith Panthers (P)	24	18	0	6	3	645	312	+333	42
2	Brisbane Broncos	24	18	0	6	3	639	425	+214	42
3	Melbourne Storm	24	16	0	8	3	627	459	+168	38
4	New Zealand Warriors	24	16	0	8	3	572	448	+124	38
5	Newcastle Knights	24	14	1	9	3	626	451	+175	35
6	Cronulla-Sutherland Sharks	24	14	0	10	3	619	497	+122	34
7	Sydney Roosters	24	13	0	11	3	472	496	−24	32
8	Canberra Raiders	24	13	0	11	3	486	623	−137	32
9	South Sydney Rabbitohs	24	12	0	12	3	564	505	+59	30
10	Parramatta Eels	24	12	0	12	3	587	574	+13	30
11	North Queensland Cowboys	24	12	0	12	3	546	542	+4	30
12	Manly Warringah Sea Eagles	24	11	1	12	3	545	539	+6	29
13	Dolphins	24	9	0	15	3	520	631	−111	24
14	Gold Coast Titans	24	9	0	15	3	527	653	−126	24
15	Canterbury-Bankstown Bulldogs	24	7	0	17	3	438	769	−331	20
16	St. George Illawarra Dragons	24	5	0	19	3	474	673	−199	16
17	Wests Tigers	24	4	0	20	3	385	675	−290	14

== Player movements ==
=== Gains ===
Nat	Pos	Player	From	Date	Ref
(Australia)	FE/HB	Jack Cogger	Huddersfield Giants (Super League)	24/10/22	
(Australia)	SR/CE	Luke Garner	Wests Tigers	24/6/22	
(Australia)	SR/LK	Zac Hosking	Brisbane Broncos	24/10/22	
(Australia)	LK/CE/FE	Tyrone Peachey	Wests Tigers	21/10/22	

=== Losses ===
Nat	Pos	Player	To	Date	Ref
(Samoa)	WG	Christian Crichton	Released		
(Australia)	LK/SR	J'maine Hopgood	Parramatta Eels	31/5/22	
(Tonga)	CE/WG	Robert Jennings	The Dolphins	10/5/22	
(Tonga)	FE/HB	Isaiya Katoa	The Dolphins	18/2/22	
(Fiji)	SR	Viliame Kikau	Canterbury-Bankstown Bulldogs	19/11/21	
(Fiji)	HK	Api Koroisau	Wests Tigers	3/12/21	
(Australia)	FE/HB	Sean O'Sullivan	Dolphins	30/6/22	
(Samoa)	WG/FB	Charlie Staines	Wests Tigers	21/10/22	
