= 2024 NRL finals series =

Rugby League tournament

- Duration: 13 September – 6 October 2024
- Teams: 8
- Premiers: Penrith Panthers (6th title)
- Minor premiers: Melbourne Storm (6th title)
- Matches played: 9
- Broadcast partners: Nine Network; Fox League

The 2024 National Rugby League finals series was a tournament staged to determine the winner of the 2024 Telstra Premiership season. The series was played over four weekends in September and October, culminating in the 2024 NRL Grand Final on 6 October 2024.

The top eight teams from the 2024 NRL season qualified for the finals series. NRL finals series were continuously played under this format since 2012.

== Qualification ==
Pos	Team	Pld	W	D	L	B	PF	PA	PD	Pts	Qualification
1	Melbourne Storm	24	19	0	5	3	692	449	+243	44	Advance to finals series
2	Penrith Panthers (P)	24	17	0	7	3	580	394	+186	40	Advance to finals series
3	Sydney Roosters	24	16	0	8	3	738	463	+275	38	Advance to finals series
4	Cronulla-Sutherland Sharks	24	16	0	8	3	653	431	+222	38	Advance to finals series
5	North Queensland Cowboys	24	15	0	9	3	657	568	+89	36	Advance to finals series
6	Canterbury-Bankstown Bulldogs	24	14	0	10	3	529	433	+96	34	Advance to finals series
7	Manly Warringah Sea Eagles	24	13	1	10	3	634	521	+113	33	Advance to finals series
8	Newcastle Knights	24	12	0	12	3	470	510	−40	30	Advance to finals series
9	Canberra Raiders	24	12	0	12	3	474	601	−127	30	
10	Dolphins	24	11	0	13	3	577	578	−1	28	
11	St. George Illawarra Dragons	24	11	0	13	3	508	634	−126	28	
12	Brisbane Broncos	24	10	0	14	3	537	607	−70	26	
13	New Zealand Warriors	24	9	1	14	3	512	574	−62	25	
14	Gold Coast Titans	24	8	0	16	3	488	656	−168	22	
15	Parramatta Eels	24	7	0	17	3	561	716	−155	20	
16	South Sydney Rabbitohs	24	7	0	17	3	494	682	−188	20	
17	Wests Tigers	24	6	0	18	3	463	750	−287	18	

Source: National Rugby League
(P) Premiers

== Finals structure ==
The system used for the 2024 NRL finals series is a final eight system. The top four teams in the eight receive the "double chance" when they play in week-one qualifying finals, such that if a top-four team loses in the first week it still remains in the finals, playing a semi-final the next week against the winner of an elimination final. The bottom four of the eight play knock-out games – only the winners survive and move on to the next week. Home ground advantage goes to the team with the higher ladder position in the first two weeks and to the qualifying final winners in the third week.

In the second week, the winners of the qualifying finals receive a bye to the third week. The losers of the qualifying final plays the elimination finals winners in a semi-final. In the third week, the winners of the semi-finals from week two play the winners of the qualifying finals in the first week. The winners of those matches move on to the Grand Final.

== Fixtures ==
=== Bracket ===
Qualifying and elimination finals
14 September – Melbourne
1	Melbourne Storm	37
4	Cronulla-Sutherland	10
14 September – Townsville
5	North Queensland	28
8	Newcastle Knights	16
15 September – Sydney
6	Canterbury-Bankstown	22
7	Manly Warringah	24
13 September – Penrith
2	Penrith Panthers	30
3	Sydney Roosters	10

Semi-finals
20 September – Sydney
Cronulla-Sutherland	26
North Queensland	18
21 September – Sydney
Sydney Roosters	40
Manly Warringah	16

Preliminary finals
27 September – Melbourne
Melbourne Storm	48
Sydney Roosters	18
28 September – Sydney
Penrith Panthers	26
Cronulla-Sutherland	6

Grand final
6 October – Sydney
Melbourne Storm	6
Penrith Panthers	14

=== Matches ===
Home	Score	Away	Match Information
Home	Score	Away	Date and time (Local)	Venue	Referee	Attendance
QUALIFYING & ELIMINATION FINALS
Penrith Panthers	30–10	Sydney Roosters	13 September, 19:50	BlueBet Stadium	Ashley Klein	21,483
Melbourne Storm	37–10	Cronulla-Sutherland Sharks	14 September, 16:05	AAMI Park	Gerard Sutton	26,326
North Queensland Cowboys	28–16	Newcastle Knights	14 September, 19:50	Queensland Country Bank Stadium	Todd Smith	24,861
Canterbury-Bankstown Bulldogs	22–24	Manly Warringah Sea Eagles	15 September, 16:05	Accor Stadium	Grant Atkins	50,714
SEMI FINALS
Cronulla-Sutherland Sharks	26–18	North Queensland Cowboys	20 September, 19:50	Allianz Stadium	Ashley Klein	19,124
Sydney Roosters	40–16	Manly Warringah Sea Eagles	21 September, 19:50	Allianz Stadium	Grant Atkins	40,818
PRELIMINARY FINALS
Melbourne Storm	48–18	Sydney Roosters	27 September, 19:50	AAMI Park	Grant Atkins	29,213
Penrith Panthers	26–6	Cronulla-Sutherland Sharks	28 September, 19:50	Accor Stadium	Ashley Klein	33,753

==== First Week: Qualifying and Elimination Finals ====
Second Qualifying Final

13 September 2024
19:50 AEST (UTC+10)

Penrith Panthers	30 – 10	Sydney Roosters
Tries: 5 Garner 22', 70'; To'o 5'; Tago 10'; Luai 17'; Goals: 5 Cleary 12', 19', 23', 34', 71'	1st: 24 – 0; 2nd: 6 – 10; Scorecard	Tries: 2 Suaalii 42'; Tedesco 46'; Goals: 1 Suaalii 48'

BlueBet Stadium, Sydney
Attendance: 21,483
Referee: Ashley Klein

First Qualifying Final

14 September 2024
16:05 AEST (UTC+10)

Melbourne Storm	37 – 10	Cronulla-Sutherland Sharks
Tries: 6 Grant 51', 71', 77'; Warbrick 24', 62'; Munster 1'; Goals: 6 Meaney 2', 26', 29', 53', 72', 76'; Field goals: 1 Papenhuyzen 79'	1st: 14 – 10; 2nd: 23 – 0 Scorecard	Tries: 2 Katoa 12'; Nikora 39'; Goals: 1 Hynes 40'

AAMI Park, Melbourne
Attendance: 26,326
Referee: Gerard Sutton

First Elimination Final

14 September 2024
19:50 AEST (UTC+10)

North Queensland Cowboys	28 – 16	Newcastle Knights
Tries: 5 Feldt 13'; Taulagi 44'; McLean 51'; Cotter 72'; Dearden 78'; Goals: 4 Holmes 45', 52', 73', 79'	1st: 4 – 12; 2nd: 24 – 4 Scorecard	Tries: 3 Brailey 21'; Sharpe 32'; Lucas 63'; Goals: 2 Ponga 23', 33'

QCB Stadium, Townsville
Attendance: 24,861
Referee: Todd Smith

Second Elimination Final

14 September 2024
16:05 AEST (UTC+10)

Canterbury-Bankstown Bulldogs	22 – 24	Manly Warringah Sea Eagles
Tries: 4 Kiraz 6'; Kikau 18'; Crichton 23'; Skelton 46'; Goals: 3 Matt Burton 20', 25', 47'	1st: 16 – 12; 2nd: 12 – 8 Scorecard	Tries: 4 Talau 14'; Bullemor 36'; Cherry-Evans 55'; Koula 71'; Goals: 4 Garrick 15', 37', 57', 72'

Accor Stadium, Sydney
Attendance: 50,714
Referee: Grant Atkins

==== Second Week: Semi Finals ====
First Semi Final

20 September 2024
19:50 AEST (UTC+10)

Cronulla-Sutherland Sharks	26 – 18	North Queensland Cowboys
Tries: 4 Trindall 13', 31'; McInnes 15'; Mulitalo 38'; Goals: 5 Hynes 14', 16', 32', 39', 65'	1st: 24 – 0; 2nd: 2 – 18; Scorecard	Tries: 3 Holmes 41', 69'; Cotter 54'; Goals: 3 Holmes 43', 55'; Drinkwater 69'

Allianz Stadium, Sydney
Attendance: 19,124
Referee: Ashley Klein

Second Semi Final

21 September 2024
19:50 AEST (UTC+10)

Sydney Roosters	40 – 16	Manly Warringah Sea Eagles
Tries: 6 Tedesco 31', 55'; Radley 11'; Smith 35'; Tupou 41'; Young 76'; Goals: 8 Suaalii 12', 26', 32', 37', 43', 52', 57'; Smith 66'	1st: 20 – 4; 2nd: 20 – 12; Scorecard	Tries: 3 Olakau'atu 38'; Talau 59'; Trbojevic 73'; Goals: 2 Garrick 60', 73'

Allianz Stadium, Sydney
Attendance: 40,818
Referee: Grant Atkins

==== Third Week: Preliminary Finals ====
First Preliminary Final

27 September 2024
19:50 AEST (UTC+10)

Melbourne Storm	48 – 18	Sydney Roosters
Tries: Papenhuyzen 12', 63'; Hughes 25', 38', 52'; Howarth 30'; Munster 74', 79'; Goals: Meaney 14', 27', 39', 54', 64'; Grant 75'; Wishart 80'	1st: 22 – 6; 2nd: 26 – 12; Scorecard	Tries: Tupou 8'; May 46'; Butcher 48'; Goals: Suaalii 3', 47', 50'

AAMI Park, Melbourne
Attendance: 29,213
Referee: Grant Atkins

Second Preliminary Final

28 September 2024
19:50 AEST (UTC+10)

Penrith Panthers	26 – 6	Cronulla-Sutherland Sharks
Tries: Alamoti 22', 65'; To'o 62'; Martin 76'; Goals: Cleary 6', 23', 35', 66'; Alamoti 77'	1st: 10 – 2; 2nd: 16 – 4 Scorecard	Tries: Katoa 59'; Goals: Hynes 17'

Accor Stadium, Sydney
Attendance: 33,753
Referee: Ashley Klein

=== Grand Final ===
2024 NRL Grand Final

Sunday, 6 October
19:30 AEDT (UTC+11)

Melbourne Storm	6–14	Penrith Panthers
Tries: 1 Grant 22'; Goals: 1 Meaney 23' (1/1)	1st: 6–10; 2nd: 0–4; Report	Tries: 3 Turuva 26'; Martin 38'; Alamoti 60'; Goals: 1 Cleary 39' (1/3)

Accor Stadium, Sydney
Attendance: 80,156
Referee: Ashley Klein
Video referee: Grant Atkins
Touch judges: David Munro, Chris Sutton
Clive Churchill Medal: Liam Martin (Penrith)
