= 2023 NRL Grand Final =

NRL Grand Final

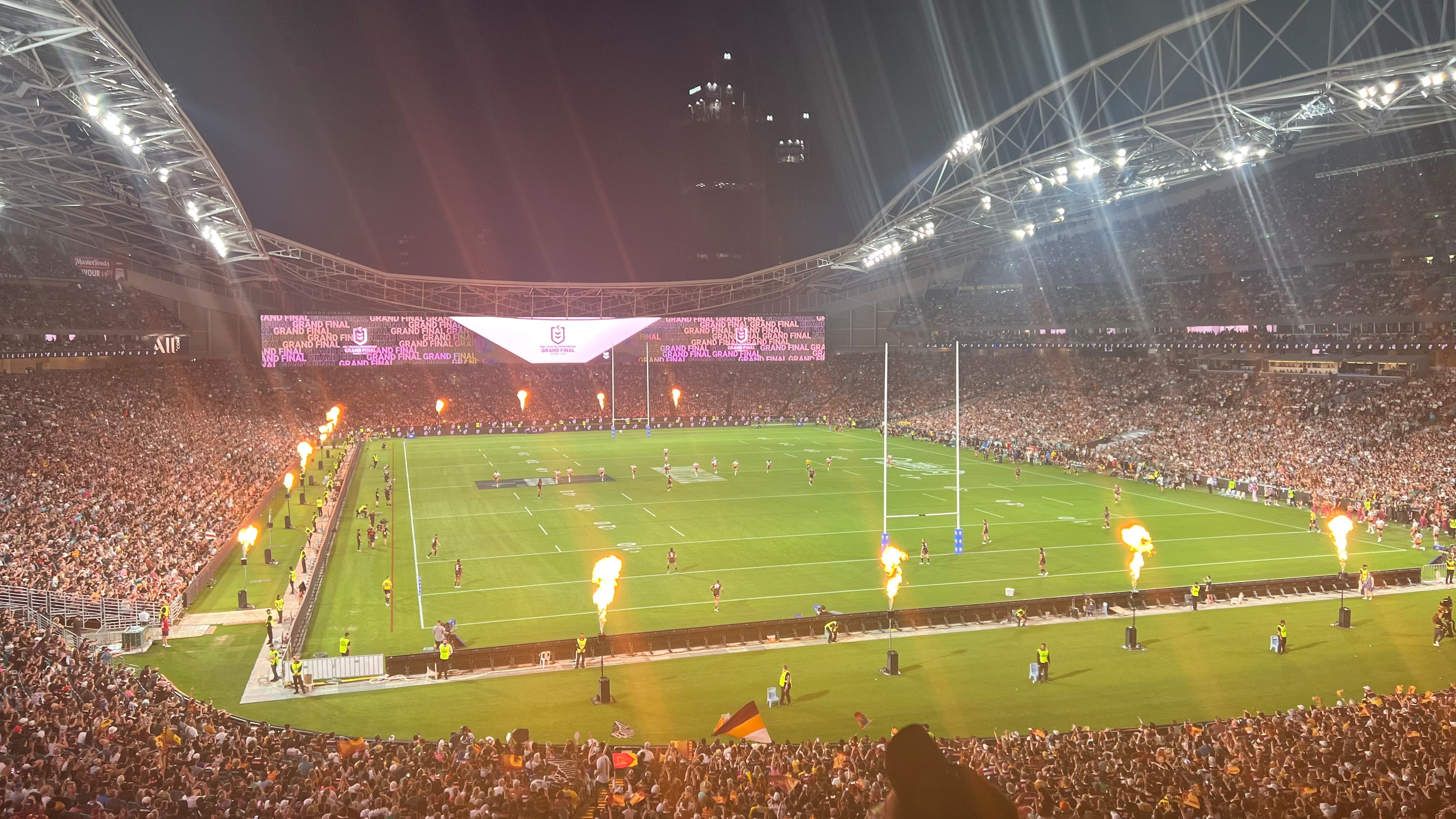
- Accor Stadium during the match

Penrith Panthers	Brisbane Broncos
26	24
	1	2	Total
PEN	8	18	26
BRI	6	18	24
- Date: 1 October 2023
- Stadium: Accor Stadium
- Location: Sydney, New South Wales, Australia
- Clive Churchill Medal: Nathan Cleary (PEN)
- National Anthem: Tim Omaji
- Pre-Match Entertainment: Tina: The Tina Turner Musical, King Stingray
- Referee: Adam Gee
- Attendance: 81,947

Broadcast partners
- Broadcasters: Nine Network
- Commentators: Mathew Thompson; Cameron Smith; Andrew Johns; Brad Fittler; Danika Mason

The 2023 NRL Grand Final was the conclusive and premiership-deciding game of the 2023 National Rugby League season in Australia. It was contested between the Penrith Panthers and the Brisbane Broncos on Sunday the 1st of October at Accor Stadium in Sydney. Penrith, who were the two-time defending premiers and the defending minor premiers, won the match 26–24 to claim their fifth premiership title, and became the first club in forty years to win three consecutive first-grade premierships, following the Parramatta Eels' three-peat from 1981 to 1983. Panthers halfback Nathan Cleary, who scored the winning try for his team, was awarded his second Clive Churchill Medal for being judged as the man of the match. The match gained significant notability for featuring the largest comeback victory in grand final history, with the Panthers overcoming a 24–8 deficit after 56 minutes by scoring 18 unanswered points to ultimately win the match.

The match was preceded by the 2023 NRL State Championship and the 2023 NRL Women's Grand Final. The match was broadcast live throughout Australia by the Nine Network.

== Background ==
This was the first NRL grand final between the Penrith Panthers and the Brisbane Broncos, and the first to feature both a New South Wales and Queensland based side since 2005. Their last clash in a finals series was in 2017, with the Broncos winning 13–6. The Panthers became the first side since the Melbourne Storm in 2009 to reach four consecutive grand finals, and were vying for their fifth premiership title after defeating the Canberra Raiders in 1991, Sydney Roosters in 2003, South Sydney Rabbitohs in 2021 and Parramatta Eels in 2022. It was Ivan Cleary's fifth grand final appearance as a coach, with two prior losses (NZ Warriors v Manly 2011 and Penrith Panthers v Melbourne Storm 2020) and two prior wins coaching Penrith (v Souths 2021/Parramatta 2022) leading into the 2023 decider.

The Broncos were aiming for their seventh premiership victory, their most recent being against the Melbourne Storm in 2006. Their last grand final appearance was a defeat to the North Queensland Cowboys in 2015. The match was Kevin Walters' first grand final appearance as a coach, becoming only the second person, after Wayne Bennett, to coach the Broncos to a grand final.

The grand final was a highly anticipated match-up between the top two teams of the regular season, with both teams finishing the regular season with eighteen wins and six losses, and Panthers claiming the minor premiership with a far superior points differential. Both teams also achieved dominant wins against the third-placed Melbourne Storm and fourth-placed New Zealand Warriors in their preceding qualifying and preliminary finals matches.

== Route to the final ==
=== Penrith Panthers ===
The 2023 Penrith Panthers season was the 57th season in the club's history. Coached by Ivan Cleary and co-captained by Nathan Cleary and Isaah Yeo, the club played their home games at BlueBet Stadium in Penrith.

Penrith Panthers' route to the final
Round	Opposition	Score
QF	New Zealand Warriors (H)	32–6
SF	Bye	N/A
PF	Melbourne Storm (H)	38–4
Key: (H) = Home venue; (A) = Away venue; (N) = Neutral venue

=== Brisbane Broncos ===
The 2023 Brisbane Broncos season was the 36th in the club's history. Coached by Kevin Walters and captained by Adam Reynolds, the club were based at the Clive Berghofer Centre and played their matches at Suncorp Stadium. The season saw a club record membership tally of 40,207.

Brisbane Broncos' route to the final
Round	Opposition	Score
QF	Melbourne Storm (H)	26–0
SF	Bye	N/A
PF	New Zealand Warriors (H)	42–12
Key: (H) = Home venue; (A) = Away venue; (N) = Neutral venue

== Pre-match ==
=== Team selection ===
Dylan Edwards, Stephen Crichton, Brian To'o, Jarome Luai, Nathan Cleary, James Fisher-Harris, Liam Martin, Moses Leota and Isaah Yeo made their fourth-straight grand final appearance for Penrith.

=== Broadcasting ===
The match was broadcast live on the Nine Network in Australia and on Sky Sport in New Zealand. Radio broadcasters included ABC, Triple M, 2GB and SEN.

=== Entertainment ===
Pre-match entertainment was headlined by the cast of Tina: The Tina Turner Musical, performing a compilation of Tina Turner's songs, including "Proud Mary", "Nutbush City Limits", and "Simply The Best", the latter of which is synonymous with rugby league after being the soundtrack to the Winfield Cup advertising campaign from 1989–1995. The Australian national anthem was performed by Tim Omaji.

Co-headlining with the cast of the musical were Indigenous Australian rock band King Stingray, who also provided the soundtrack for Fox League's 2023 Finals advertising campaign.

=== Officiating ===
Adam Gee refereed his first NRL grand final, with touch judges Chris Sutton and David Munro. Ashley Klein was the bunker official.

=== Attendance ===
Grand Final tickets went on sale in early August, with club allocations released following the Preliminary Finals on Monday, September 25. The game was officially sold out a day later. 81,947 people attended.

=== Curtain-raiser matches ===
Curtain-raiser matches on the day were the NRL State Championship between the Brisbane Tigers and the South Sydney Rabbitohs, and NRL Women's Grand Final between the Newcastle Knights and the Gold Coast Titans. Both were shown live on the Nine Network in Australia.

== Match summary ==
2023 NRL Grand Final

Sunday, 1 October
19:30 AEDT (UTC+11)

Penrith Panthers	26 – 24	Brisbane Broncos
Tries: 4 Kenny 17'; Leota 62'; Crichton 67'; Cleary 76'; Goals: 5 Crichton 18' (1/1); Cleary pen 29', 63', 68', 78' (4/4)	1st: 8–6; 2nd: 18–18; Report	Tries: 4 Flegler 38'; Mam 44', 52', 54'; Goals: 4 Reynolds 39', 45', 53', 56' (4/4)

Accor Stadium, Sydney
Attendance: 81,947
Referee: Adam Gee
Video referee: Ashley Klein
Touch judges: Chris Sutton, Dave Munro
Clive Churchill Medal: Nathan Cleary (Penrith)

Penrith Panthers
FB	1	Dylan Edwards
WG	2	Sunia Turuva
CE	3	Izack Tago (substituted off) 72'
CE	4	Stephen Crichton 69'
WG	5	Brian To'o
FE	6	Jarome Luai (substituted off) 52'
HB	7	Nathan Cleary 78'
PR	8	Moses Leota (substituted off) 25', (substituted on) 50', 64', (substituted off) 70', (substituted on) 72', (substituted off) 75'
HK	9	Mitch Kenny 19'
PR	10	James Fisher-Harris (substituted off) 33', (substituted on) 54'
SR	11	Scott Sorensen (substituted off) 59', (substituted on) 72'
SR	12	Liam Martin
LF	13	Isaah Yeo (substituted off) 57', (substituted on) 70'
Interchange:
IN	14	Jack Cogger (substituted on) 52'
IN	15	Lindsay Smith (substituted on) 25', (substituted off) 54', (substituted on) 57', (substituted off) 72', (substituted on) 79'
IN	16	Spencer Leniu (substituted on) 33', (substituted off) 50', (substituted on) 75', (substituted off) 79'
IN	17	Luke Garner (substituted on) 59'
CS	18	Tyrone Peachey
Coach:
Ivan Cleary

Brisbane Broncos
FB	1	Reece Walsh
WG	2	Jesse Arthars
CE	3	Kotoni Staggs
CE	4	Herbie Farnworth
WG	5	Selwyn Cobbo
FE	6	Ezra Mam 45', 53', 56'
HB	7	Adam Reynolds
PR	8	Thomas Flegler (substituted off) 22', (substituted on) 35', 40', (substituted off) 51', (substituted on) 70'
HK	9	Billy Walters (substituted off) 30', (substituted on) 66'
PR	10	Payne Haas (substituted off) 35', (substituted on) 51'
SR	11	Kurt Capewell (substituted off) 76'
SR	12	Jordan Riki (substituted off) 60', (substituted on) 76'
LF	13	Patrick Carrigan (substituted off) 51', (substituted on) 60'
Interchange:
IN	14	Tyson Smoothy (substituted on) 30', (substituted off) 66'
IN	15	Brendan Piakura (substituted on) 60'
IN	16	Kobe Hetherington (substituted on) 51', (substituted off) 70'
IN	17	Keenan Palasia (substituted on) 22', (substituted off) 60'
CS	18	Corey Oates
Coach:
Kevin Walters

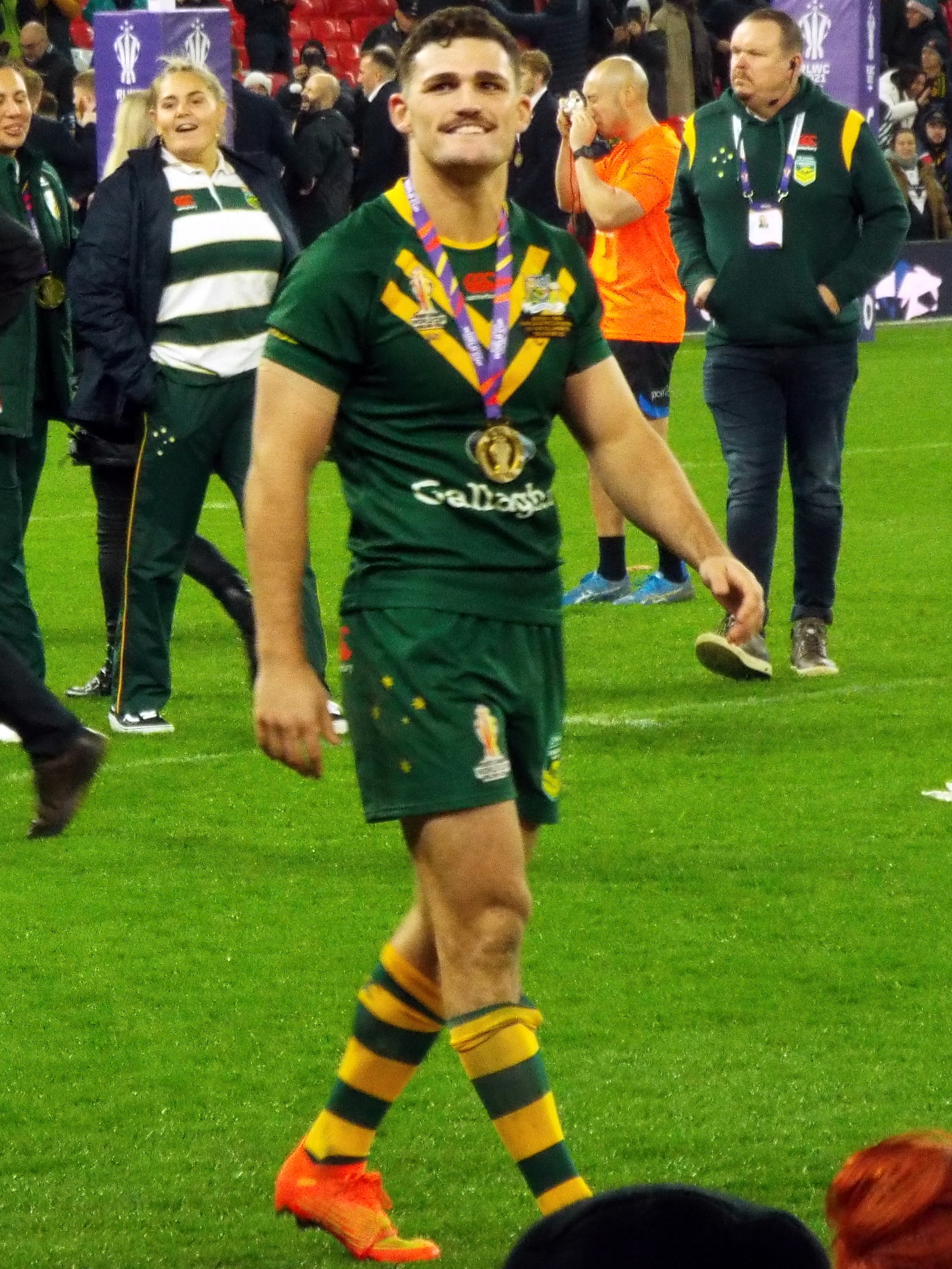
Nathan Cleary (pictured representing Australia) made a try-assist, kicked a 40/20, and scored the match-winning try in the final 23 minutes of the match. He was ultimately awarded a second Clive Churchill Medal for his performance.

Both teams played aggressively in the opening exchanges, dominated by brutal hit-ups and tackles from the forwards. Penrith had the better share of the early possession and field position, courtesy of several handling errors by Brisbane players. However, due to strong Brisbane scramble defence on their own line, Penrith were unable to score any points until the 17th minute when an attempted short kick-off by Adam Reynolds was knocked back by Herbie Farnworth, and with no Broncos player in position to gather the loose ball, it bounced back towards the try line and was picked up by Mitch Kenny to score the opening try of the match unmarked. Brisbane managed to find some field position and momentum, managing to score through Thomas Flegler in the dying seconds of the first half and leaving the score 8–6 at half-time.

The second half started with a 10 minute hat-trick by Broncos five-eighth Ezra Mam, which left the score at 24–8 in favour of the Broncos. With Scott Sorensen (HIA) and star players Jarome Luai (shoulder) and Isaah Yeo (HIA) forced off the field due to injury, and staring at a 16 point deficit with only 20 minutes of the match remaining, the Panthers looked to be in an almost impossible situation. However, in the 62nd minute, Penrith halfback Nathan Cleary forced a clean line-break on the Brisbane 40m line, fending off former teammate Kurt Capewell and passing back inside to Moses Leota in support who scored under the goalposts. With the try converted, the score was left at 24–14 to the Broncos.

On the next set, the Penrith halfback kicked a 40/20 on the 3rd tackle. Whilst unable to directly capitalise, this provided field position for the Panthers. An error by Broncos lock Patrick Carrigan on the half-way line handed Penrith another opportunity in attacking field position. In the 67th minute, Nathan Cleary found a long pass to a rushing Stephen Crichton, catching the ball on the 10m line, placing a strong right-hand fend on the chest of opposing centre Kotoni Staggs and powering his way through another two would-be defenders to roll over the try line. This was his fourth consecutive try in NRL Grand Finals, in his 100th and final game for the Panthers. With Cleary successfully converting from close to the side-line, the deficit had now been reduced to 24-20.

Brisbane continued to play their expansive style of football, with Reece Walsh managing a line-break with 10 minutes to go. However Dylan Edwards, the Panthers fullback made a cover tackle on Walsh, stopping an almost certain try in the last line of defence. With a handover on their own 20m line, the Panthers found their way forwards to the Brisbane 40m line, where centre Stephen Crichton placed a kick over the defence, finding Reece Walsh out of position in defence and chasing his own kick to force Walsh back into the in-goal. On the drop-out, Reynolds' kick went out on the full, and Panthers elected to take the penalty tap. The attacking set following ended with a grubber collected by Selwyn Cobbo, and Brisbane then managing to return the ball up to their own 40m line.

With five minutes remaining, Stephen Crichton forced yet another line drop-out with a precise grubber into the corner, and Sunia Turuva tackling Kotoni Staggs back into the in-goal. This repeat set would prove decisive, where on the fifth play, dummy-half Mitch Kenny passed the ball on the short side to his co-captain Nathan Cleary, who identified a tiring Broncos defence, stepping around four defenders and bursting through a last-ditch tackle from Reece Walsh to score the match-winning try with only two minutes remaining.

After the conversion, the Broncos had one final set to win, in which they had to advance 82m. On the fourth tackle, Reece Walsh seemed to find space but was tackled by Stephen Crichton. Walsh attempted to pass an offload, however the pass was taken by Scott Sorensen, sealing the result for Penrith.

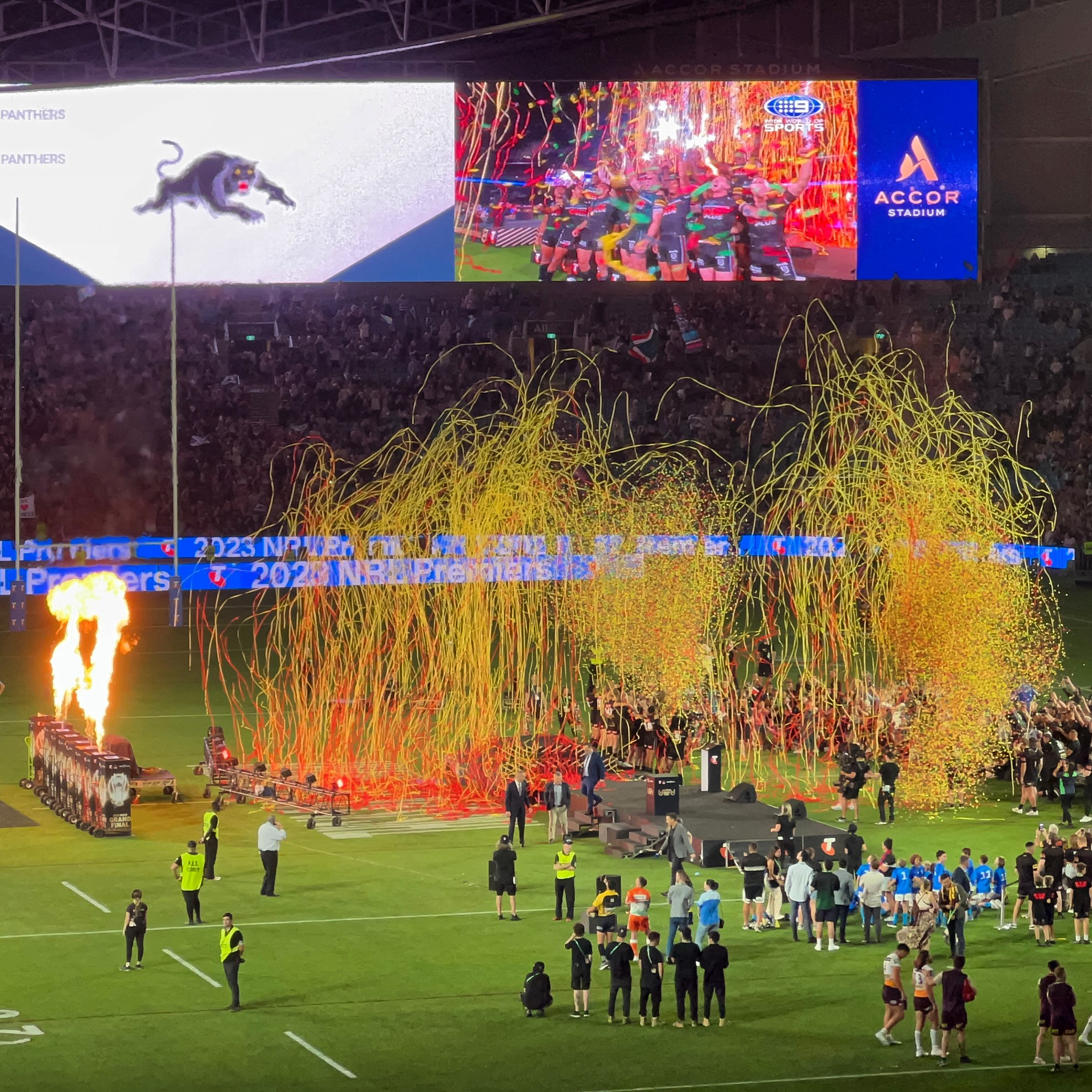
Penrith celebrating their victory

For his match-winning performance, Nathan Cleary was awarded the Clive Churchill Medal, which he had previously won in 2021 also. His second-half efforts have also been described by commentators and fans alike to be the best solo grand final performance in history. It was later revealed that Cleary suffered a knee injury in the tenth minute of play.

=== Statistics ===
The 16-point comeback achieved by the Penrith Panthers is the greatest in grand final history, surpassing a previous record held by Melbourne Storm since 1999 (Melbourne's comeback from 14 points down against St George Illawarra) as the biggest-ever comeback in a grand final. The Panthers overturned a 24–8 deficit into a 26–24 final score in the final 20 minutes of the match.

== Post-match ==
As winners of the match, Penrith Panthers earned the right to play in the World Club Challenge against 2023 Super League Grand Final winners.

The Panthers farewelled triple premiership winners and local juniors Stephen Crichton and Spencer Leniu, who departed for the Canterbury-Bankstown Bulldogs and Sydney Roosters respectively. Bench five-eighth Jack Cogger left for the Newcastle Knights after a single season at Penrith, while utility player Jaeman Salmon also left to join Crichton at the Bulldogs. While he did not feature in the 2023 Grand Final, he did win a premiership in 2022 with Penrith.

== Opening matches ==
Two opening matches were played on the ground prior to the grand final: the NRL State Championship and NRL Women's Grand Final. Both matches were broadcast live throughout Australia by the Nine Network.

=== NRL State Championship ===
2023 NRL State Championship

Sunday, 1 October
13:20pm AEDT (UTC+11)

South Sydney Rabbitohs	42–22	Brisbane Tigers
	1st: 12–6; 2nd: 30–16

Accor Stadium, Sydney
Referee: Wyatt Raymond
Bunker: Chris Butler
Touch judges: Tyson Brough, Cameron Paddy

=== NRL Women's Premiership Grand Final ===
2023 NRL Women's Grand Final

Sunday, 1 October
15:55pm AEDT (UTC+11)

Newcastle Knights	24–18	Gold Coast Titans
	1st: 12–8; 2nd: 12–10

Accor Stadium, Sydney
Attendance: 40,649
Referee: Belinda Sharpe
Bunker: Kasey Badger
Touch judges: Rochelle Tamarua, Mitch Currie
