= 2024 NRL Grand Final =

NRL Grand Final

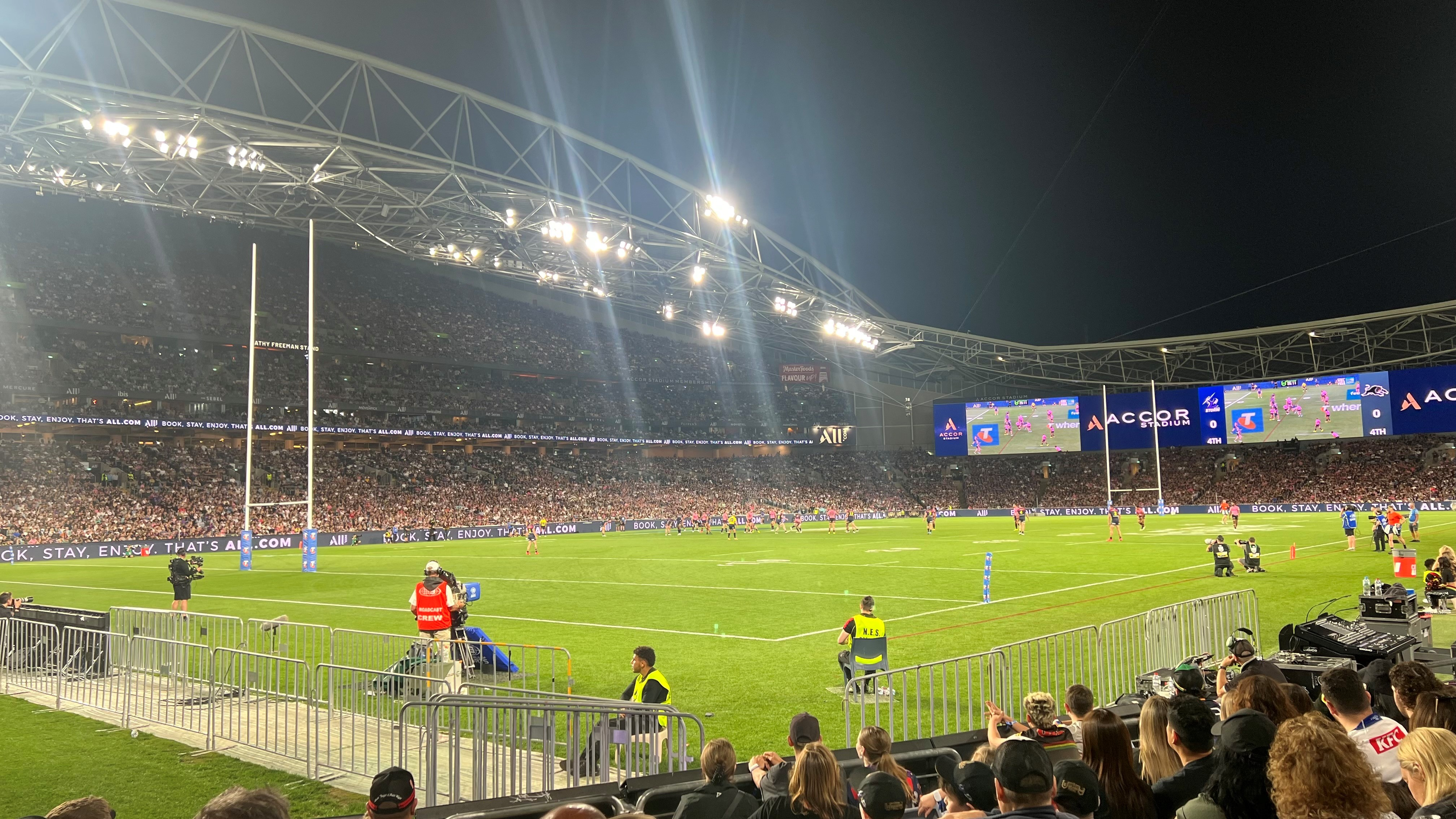
- Accor Stadium during the match

Melbourne Storm	Penrith Panthers
6	14
	1	2	Total
MEL	6	0	6
PEN	10	4	14
- Date: 6 October 2024
- Stadium: Accor Stadium
- Location: Sydney, New South Wales, Australia
- Clive Churchill Medal: Liam Martin
- National Anthem: Dami Im
- Pre-Match Entertainment: The Kid Laroi
- Referee: Ashley Klein
- Attendance: 80,156

Broadcast partners
- Broadcasters: Nine Network
- Commentators: Mathew Thompson; Billy Slater; Andrew Johns; Brad Fittler; Danika Mason

The 2024 NRL Grand Final was the conclusive and premiership-deciding game of the 2024 National Rugby League season in Australia. It was contested between the Melbourne Storm and the Penrith Panthers on Sunday 6 October at Accor Stadium in Sydney. In front of 80,156 spectators, defending premiers Penrith defeated the minor premiers Melbourne 14–6 to extend their premiership streak to four titles in a row, and their sixth overall. The Clive Churchill Medal was awarded to second-row forward Liam Martin for being judged as man of the match.

The match was preceded by the 2024 NRL State Championship and the NRL Women's Premiership Grand Final. The match was broadcast live throughout Australia by the Nine Network. Pre-match entertainment was performed by Australian rapper The Kid Laroi.

== Background ==
Melbourne Storm's route to the final
Round	Opposition	Venue	Score
QF	Cronulla Sharks	AAMI Park (H)	37–10
SF	Advanced to Preliminary Finals		
PF	Sydney Roosters	AAMI Park (H)	48–18
Key: (H) = Home venue; (A) = Away venue; (N) = Neutral venue

Penrith Panthers' route to the final
Round	Opposition	Venue	Score
QF	Sydney Roosters	BlueBet Stadium (H)	30–10
SF	Advanced to Preliminary Finals		
PF	Cronulla Sharks	Accor Stadium (H)	26–6
Key: (H) = Home venue; (A) = Away venue; (N) = Neutral venue

The 2024 NRL season is the 117th season of professional rugby league in Australia and the 27th season run by the National Rugby League. The season consisted of 27 competition rounds, followed by a finals series contested by the top eight teams on the competition ladder.

The 2024 Melbourne Storm season was the 27th season in the club's history. Coached by Craig Bellamy and captained by Harry Grant, the club played their home games at AAMI Park in Melbourne. The Storm finished in first place on the ladder with 44 points and a 19–5 win-loss record, taking out the J. J. Giltinan Shield for winning the competition's minor premiership, while setting a new club record for crowds with an average attendance of 21,067 at each home game. The 2024 Penrith Panthers season was the 58th season in the club's history. Coached by Ivan Cleary and co-captained by Nathan Cleary and Isaah Yeo, the club played their home games at BlueBet Stadium in Penrith. The Panthers finished the regular season in second place on the ladder with 40 points and a 17–7 win–loss record.

It would be the second time the Melbourne Storm and Penrith Panthers had faced each other in a grand final match, after featuring in the 2020 premiership decider, and the first time since 2014 in which the grand finalists had previously played each other in a decider. The 2020 grand final was the Storm's last grand final appearance as well as their most recent premiership victory. The 2020 match would also be the Penrith Panthers' first of now five-straight grand final appearances, which accomplishes a new record in the NRL competition era, and was last achieved by the South Sydney Rabbitohs in 1971.

The two clubs played each other twice in the 2024 season; in round 1 with the Storm beating the Panthers 8–0 at AAMI Park, and round 24 where the Storm won again 24–22 at BlueBet Stadium. Their last finals meeting was a 38–4 win for Penrith at the 2023 preliminary finals.

== Pre-match ==
=== Team selection ===
Dylan Edwards, Brian To'o, Jarome Luai, Nathan Cleary, James Fisher-Harris, Liam Martin, Moses Leota and Isaah Yeo all made their fifth-straight grand final appearance for Penrith.

Penrith second-row forward Scott Sorensen was a late addition into the side, having missed both previous finals games with a hamstring injury. His inclusion resulted in Luke Garner moving to the interchange bench and Matt Eisenhuth being dropped to reserve.

Melbourne Storm forward Nelson Asofa-Solomona was handed a five-match suspension by the NRL Judiciary following the preliminary final, meaning the Storm brought in Lazarus Vaalepu for just his seventh NRL appearance. Vaalepu was the least experienced player to play in a grand final since 1994.

Melbourne made no changes from their team as first named. Four Storm players had previous grand final experience, with Cameron Munster appearing in his fifth decider.

=== Broadcasting ===
The match was broadcast live on the Nine Network in Australia and on Sky Sport in New Zealand. Radio broadcasters included ABC, Triple M, 2GB and SEN.

=== Entertainment ===
Game-day entertainment was headlined by Australian rapper The Kid Laroi.

=== Officiating ===
Ashley Klein was appointed to his third NRL grand final, with touch judges Chris Sutton and David Munro. Grant Atkins was appointed as the bunker official.

=== Attendance ===
The game was attended by 80,156 people.

== Match summary ==
2024 NRL Grand Final

Sunday, 6 October
19:30 AEDT (UTC+11)

Melbourne Storm	6 – 14	Penrith Panthers
Tries: 1 Grant 22'; Goals: 1 Meaney 23' (1/1)	1st: 6–10; 2nd: 0–4; Report	Tries: 3 Turuva 26'; Martin 38'; Alamoti 60'; Goals: 1 Cleary 39' (1/3)

Accor Stadium, Sydney
Attendance: 80,156
Referee: Ashley Klein
Video referee: Grant Atkins
Touch judges: David Munro, Chris Sutton
Clive Churchill Medal: Liam Martin (Penrith)

Melbourne Storm
FB	1	Ryan Papenhuyzen
WG	2	William Warbrick
CE	3	Jack Howarth
CE	4	Nick Meaney
WG	5	Xavier Coates
FE	6	Cameron Munster
HB	7	Jahrome Hughes
PR	8	Tui Kamikamica
HK	9	Harry Grant
PR	10	Josh King
SR	11	Shawn Blore
SR	12	Eliesa Katoa
LF	13	Trent Loiero
Interchange:
IN	14	Tyran Wishart
IN	15	Christian Welch
IN	16	Lazarus Vaalepu
IN	17	Alec MacDonald
CS	18	Grant Anderson
Coach:
Craig Bellamy

Penrith Panthers
FB	1	Dylan Edwards
WG	2	Sunia Turuva
CE	3	Izack Tago
CE	4	Paul Alamoti
WG	5	Brian To'o
FE	6	Jarome Luai
HB	7	Nathan Cleary
PR	8	Moses Leota
HK	9	Mitch Kenny
PR	10	James Fisher-Harris
SR	12	Liam Martin
SR	19	Scott Sorensen
LF	13	Isaah Yeo
Interchange:
IN	11	Luke Garner
IN	14	Brad Schneider
IN	15	Lindsay Smith
IN	16	Liam Henry
CS	17	Matt Eisenhuth
Coach:
Ivan Cleary

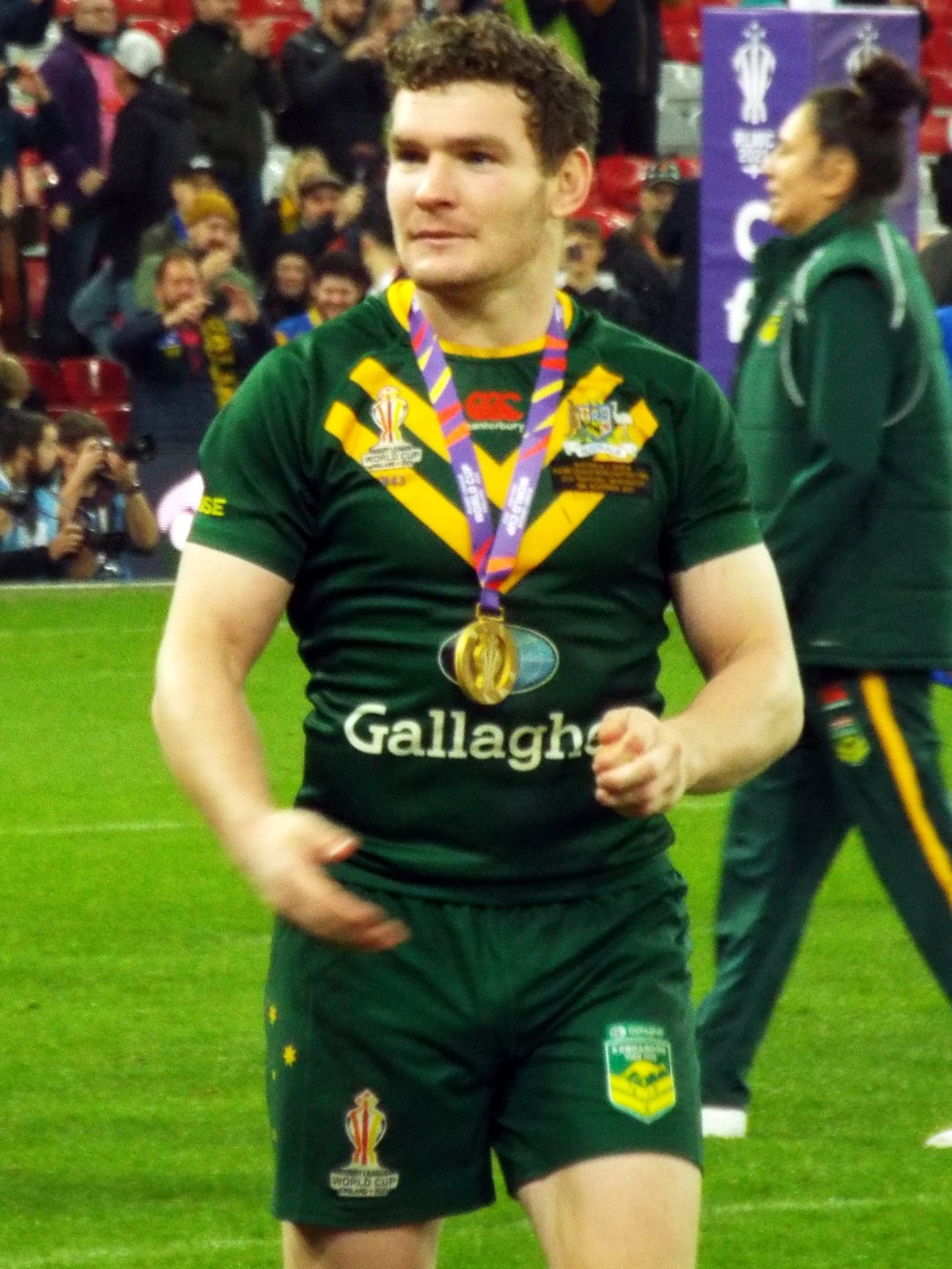
Liam Martin (pictured representing Australia) setting up a try, making 46 tackles, ran for 92 meters and scored a try in the 39th minute of the match. He was ultimately awarded the Clive Churchill Medal for his performance.

== Post-match ==
By extending their premiership-streak to four consecutive titles, the Panthers became the first club since the St. George Dragons of 1959 to accomplish this record. Their sixth premiership win lifts Penrith to equal-seventh on the all-time Premiership tally, alongside the Brisbane Broncos. The Panthers' fifth title in the NRL era moves them ahead of both the Sydney Roosters and Melbourne Storm to become the most successful club of the NRL competition era which began in 1998.

== Opening matches ==
Two opening matches were played on the ground prior to the grand final: the NRL State Championship and NRL Women's Grand Final. Both matches were broadcast live throughout Australia by the Nine Network.

=== NRL State Championship ===
2024 NRL State Championship

Sunday, 6 October
13:20 AEDT (UTC+11)

Newtown Jets	18–20	Norths Devils
Tries: 4 Stonestreet 16', 31', 45'; Puru 23'; Goals: 1 Puru 17' (1/4)	1st: 14–10; 2nd: 4–10; Report	Tries: 4 Simbiken 4'; Lipp 39'; Keeley 55', 74'; Goals: 2 Lipp 6', 56' (2/4)

Accor Stadium, Sydney
Referee: Liam Kennedy
Video referee: Peter Gough
Touch judges: Jarrod Cole, Kieren Irons
Player of the Match: Oryn Keeley (Norths)

=== NRL Women's Premiership Grand Final ===
2024 NRL Women's Grand Final

Sunday, 6 October
15:55 AEDT (UTC+11)

Sydney Roosters	32–28	Cronulla Sharks
Tries: 6 Kernick 15', 66'; Fressard 18'; Parker 21', 26'; Sergis 34'; Goals: 4 Kelleher 16', 35', pen 52', 67' (4/7)	1st: 24–0; 2nd: 8–28; Report	Tries: 5 Penitani 38', 68'; Dodd 43'; Hannaway 48'; Johnston 61'; Goals: 4 Preston 39', 44', 50', 62' (4/5)

Accor Stadium, Sydney
Attendance: 40,623
Referee: Ziggy Przeklasa-Adamski
Video referee: Kasey Badger
Touch judges: Karra-Lee Nolan, Rochelle Tamarua
Karyn Murphy Medal: Tarryn Aiken (Sydney)
