= Luke Sommerton =

Australian rugby league footballer

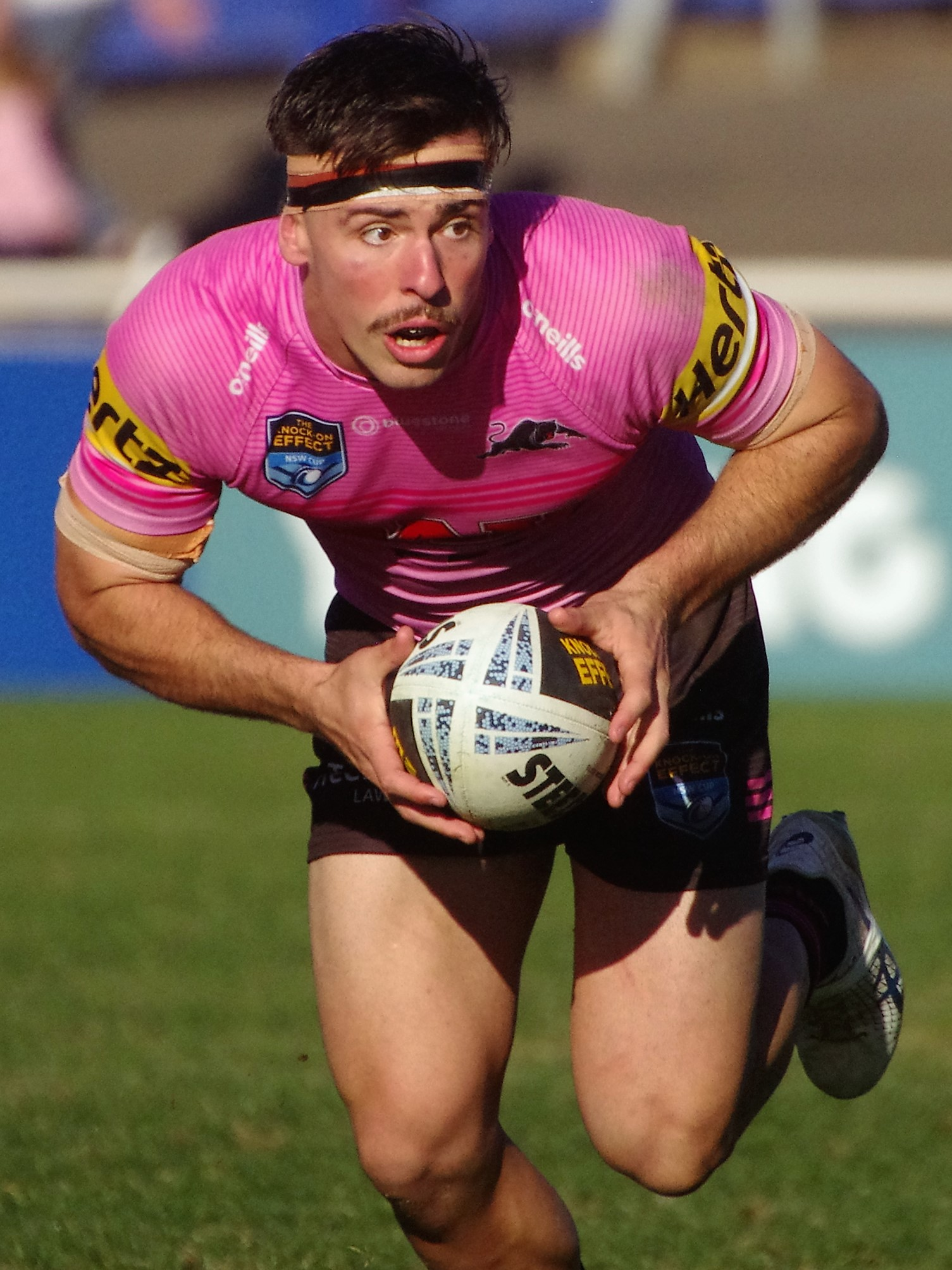

Personal information
- Full name: Luke Sommerton
- Born: 22 February 2000 (age 26) Sydney, New South Wales, Australia
- Height: 181 cm (5 ft 11 in)
- Weight: 92 kg (14 st 7 lb)

Playing information
- Position: Hooker, Loose forward
Club
Years	Team	Pld	T	G	FG	P
2023–25	Penrith Panthers	12	2	0	0	8
2026–	Gold Coast Titans	5	0	0	0	0
	Total	17	2	0	0	8
- Source: As of 4 September 2026

Luke Sommerton (born 22 February 2000) is an Australian rugby league footballer who plays as a hooker for the Gold Coast Titans in the National Rugby League (NRL).

== Playing career ==
Sommerton played junior rugby league for the Hills District Bulls.

=== 2023, 2024 & 2025 ===
Sommerton made his first grade debut in round 24 against the Manly Warringah Sea Eagles of the 2023 NRL season. Sommerton was limited to only three appearances with Penrith in the 2024 NRL season. The following year, he played six games for the club in the 2025 NRL season. On 9 September, it was announced that Sommerton would be departing Penrith at the end of the 2025 NRL season after not being offered a new contract by the club. In late 2025, Sommerton signed a two-year deal to join the Gold Coast starting in 2026.
