= Moses Leota =

New Zealand and Samoa international rugby league footballer

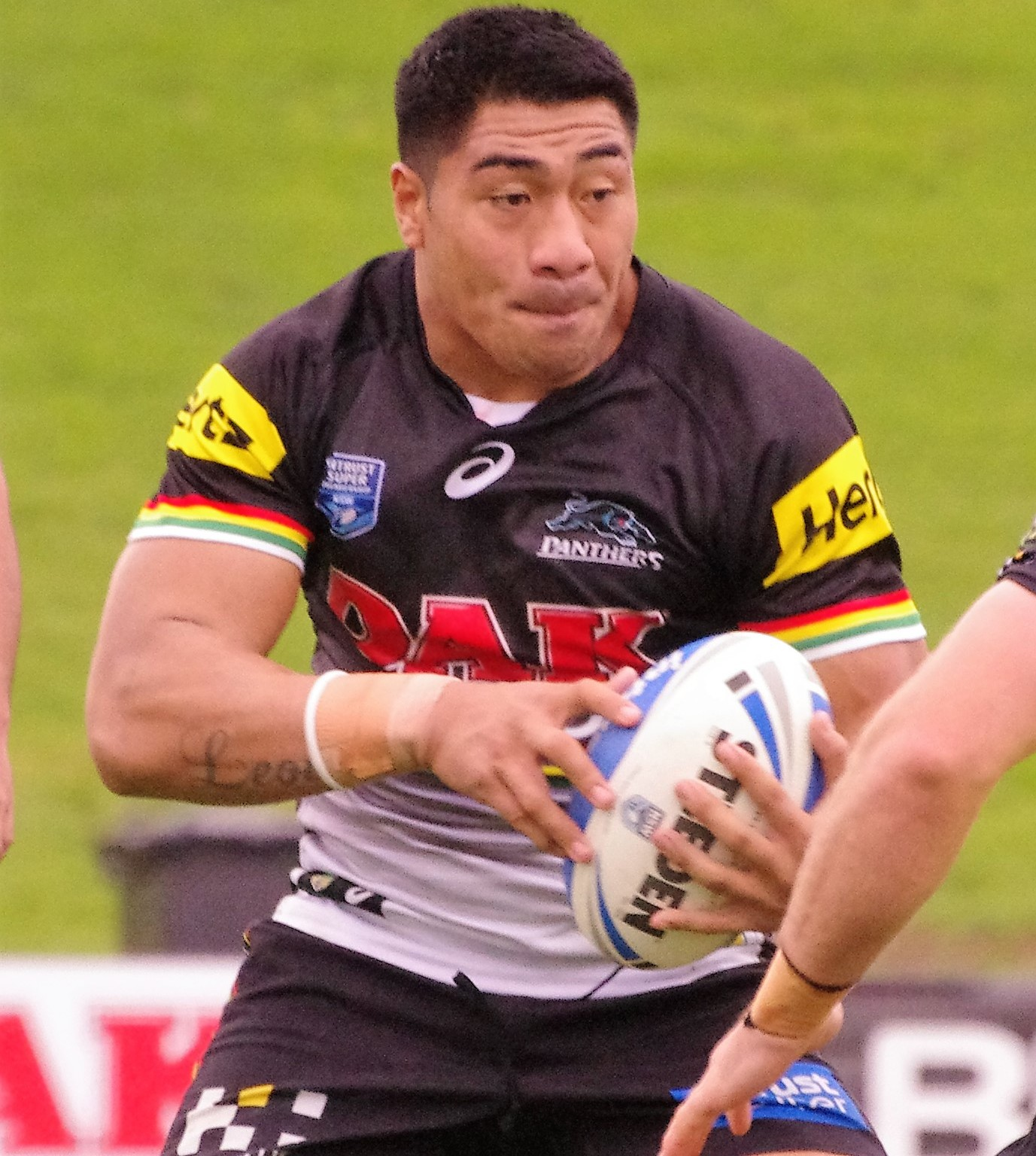

Personal information
- Born: 20 July 1995 (age 31) Auckland, New Zealand
- Height: 182 cm (6 ft 0 in)
- Weight: 107 kg (16 st 12 lb)

Playing information
- Position: Prop
Club
Years	Team	Pld	T	G	FG	P
2016–	Penrith Panthers	227	16	0	0	64
Representative
Years	Team	Pld	T	G	FG	P
2017	NSW Residents	1	1	0	0	4
2019	Samoa 9s	3	2	0	0	10
2019	Samoa	1	0	0	0	0
2022–	New Zealand	13	0	0	0	0
- Source: As of 15 November 2026

Moses Leota (born 20 July 1995) is a professional rugby league footballer who plays as a prop and lock for the Penrith Panthers in the NRL. He has played for both Samoa and New Zealand at international level. He won the 2021, 2022, 2023 and 2024 NRL Grand Finals with the Penrith Panthers.

== Background ==
Leota was born in Auckland, New Zealand raised in Mount Roskill, Moses Leota moved to Sydney at the age of 13. He is of Samoan descent from the village of Tuana’i in Upolu and was also raised in Penrith, New South Wales, Australia.

Before moving to Australia, he played for the Mt Albert Lions, and played rugby union for Roskill Districts. He then moved to Australia and played his junior rugby league for the St Mary's Saints, before being signed by the Penrith Panthers.

== Playing career ==
=== Early career ===
In 2014 and 2015, Leota played for the Penrith Panthers' NYC team.

=== 2016 ===
In 2016, Leota graduated to the Penrith's Intrust Super Premiership NSW team. In round 14 of the 2016 NRL season, he made his NRL debut for Penrith against the Manly-Warringah Sea Eagles. In November, he extended his contract with Penrith from the end of 2017 until the end of 2019.

=== 2017 ===
Leota made 10 appearances for Penrith in the 2017 NRL season as the club finished 7th on the table. Leota played in both finals games for Penrith as the club was eliminated in the second week by Brisbane.

=== 2018 ===
In round 4 of the 2018 NRL season, Moses “sole” Leota scored his first NRL career try against North Queensland 33 - 14 win at 1300SMILES Stadium. Leota made 20 appearances for Penrith in the 2018 NRL season as the club finished 5th and reached the elimination final before being defeated by Cronulla-Sutherland 21-20 at the Sydney Football Stadium.

=== 2019 ===
Leota made a total of 24 appearances for Penrith in the 2019 NRL season as the club finished 10th on the table and missed out on the finals for the first time since 2015. It was a disappointing end to the season for Penrith as they had been tipped by many to reach the finals series and be one of the contenders for the premiership. At one stage of the season, the club sat last on the table before a mid-season revival lifted them off the bottom to finish just outside the finals places.

=== 2020 ===
Leota played every game of the 2020 NRL season as the club claimed the Minor Premiership and reached the 2020 NRL Grand Final. Leota played from the interchange bench in Penrith's 26-20 loss against Melbourne in the grand final.

=== 2021 ===
Leota played a total of 24 games and reached the milestone 100 games for Penrith in the 2021 NRL season including the club's 2021 NRL Grand Final victory over South Sydney which saw them claim their third premiership.

=== 2022 ===
Leota played 18 games for Penrith in the 2022 NRL season including the clubs 2022 NRL Grand Final victory over Parramatta.

=== 2023 ===
On 18 February, Leota played in Penrith's 13-12 upset loss to St Helens RFC in the 2023 World Club Challenge. Leota played 26 games for Penrith in the 2023 NRL season including the club's 26-24 victory over Brisbane in the 2023 NRL Grand Final as Penrith won their third straight premiership. Leota scored a try in the second half of the game, displaying great tenacity and anticipation in backing up to support a line-break from halfback Nathan Cleary.

=== 2024 ===
Leota played a total of 26 matches for Penrith in the 2024 NRL season. On 6 October, Leota played in the 2024 NRL Grand Final for Penrith's fourth consecutive grand final win. Earlier in the year, on 24 February, Leota played in Penrith's 2024 World Club Challenge final loss against Wigan.

=== 2025 ===
Leota played a total of 26 games for Penrith in the 2025 NRL season as the club finished 7th on the table. Leota played in Penrith's narrow preliminary final loss against Brisbane.

=== 2026 ===
Leota played 26 matches for Penrith in the 2026 NRL season as the club claimed the minor premiership. Leota played in the clubs shock preliminary final loss to Newcastle.

== Statistics ==
Year	Team	Games	Tries	Pts
2016	Penrith Panthers	4		
2017	Penrith Panthers	10		
2018	Penrith Panthers	20	2	8
2019	Penrith Panthers	24	3	12
2020	Penrith Panthers	23		
2021	Penrith Panthers	24	3	12
2022	Penrith Panthers	18	1	4
2023	Penrith Panthers	26	3	12
2024	Penrith Panthers	26	1	4
2025	Penrith Panthers	26	1	4
2026	Penrith Panthers	19		
2027	Penrith Panthers			
	Totals	220	15	60
