= Jack Cole (rugby league) =

Australian rugby league footballer

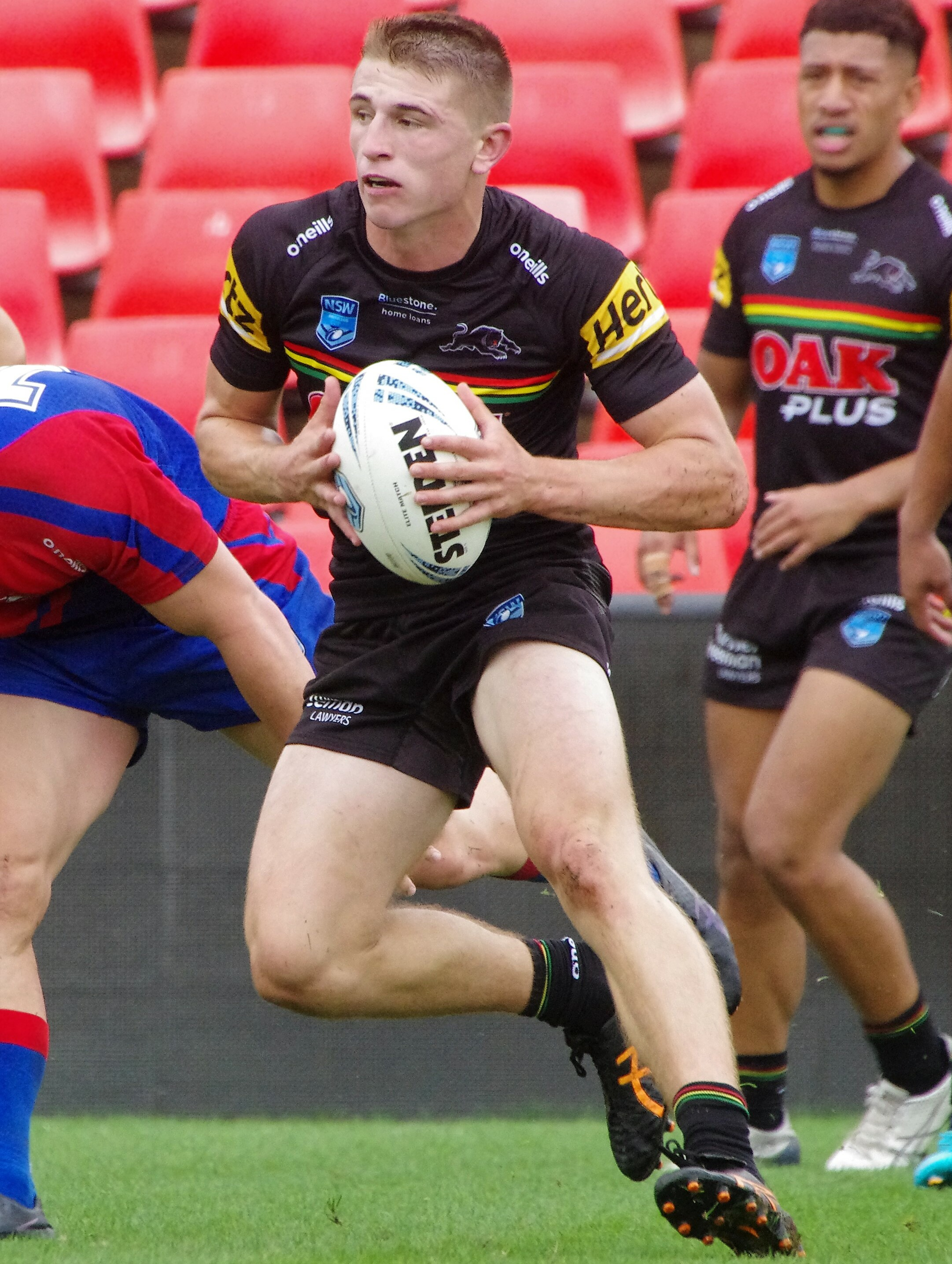

Personal information
- Full name: Jack Cole
- Born: 3 July 2003 (age 23) Orange, New South Wales, Australia
- Height: 187 cm (6 ft 2 in)
- Weight: 89 kg (14 st 0 lb)

Playing information
- Position: Five-eighth
Club
Years	Team	Pld	T	G	FG	P
2022–26	Penrith Panthers	23	3	0	0	12
2027–	Perth Bears	0	0	0	0	0
	Total	23	3	0	0	12
- Source: As of 20 October 2026

Jack Cole (born 3 July 2003) is a professional rugby league footballer who plays as a five-eighth for the Perth Bears in the NRL.

== Early life ==
Cole played his junior rugby league for the Orange CYMS in the Group 10 Rugby League and then graduated through to the Penrith Panthers junior system.

== Playing career ==
=== Penrith Panthers ===
In round 25 of the 2022 NRL season, Cole made his debut for the Penrith side against the North Queensland Cowboys. Cole spent the majority of the season playing for Penrith's NSW Cup team. Cole played for Penrith in their 2022 NSW Cup Grand Final victory scoring a try during the first half. On 2 October, Cole played in Penrith's 44–10 victory over Norths Devils in the NRL State Championship final. On 24 February 2024, Cole played in Penrith's 2024 World Club Challenge final loss against Wigan.

=== Perth Bears ===
Cole joined expansion club Perth Bears in 2027.
