= Lindsay Smith (rugby league) =

Australia international rugby league footballer

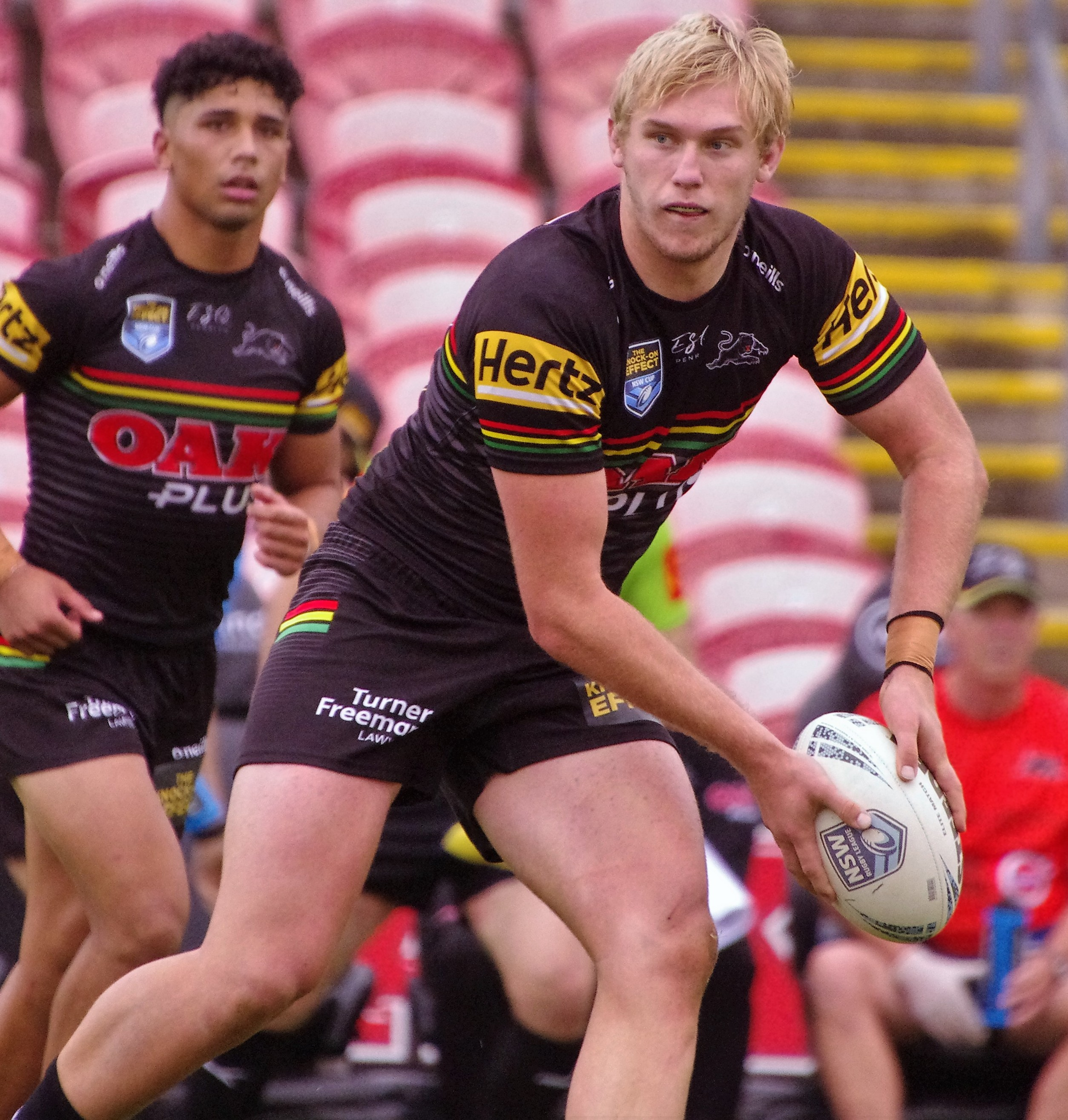

Personal information
- Full name: Lindsay Smith
- Born: 13 January 2000 (age 26) Sydney, New South Wales, Australia
- Height: 194 cm (6 ft 4 1/2 in)
- Weight: 106 kg (16 st 10 lb)

Playing information
- Position: Prop, Lock
Club
Years	Team	Pld	T	G	FG	P
2021–	Penrith Panthers	106	12	0	0	48
Representative
Years	Team	Pld	T	G	FG	P
2024–	Australia	4	0	0	0	0
- Source: As of 22 November 2026

Lindsay Smith (born 13 January 2000) is an Australian professional rugby league footballer who plays as a prop or lock forward for the Penrith Panthers in the National Rugby League and Australia at international level.

He won the 2023 and 2024 NRL Grand Finals with the Penrith Panthers.

== Background ==
Smith played junior rugby league for the St Marys Saints and attended Westfields Sports High School.

== Playing career ==
=== Early career ===
In 2016, Smith represented the New South Wales under-16s team and won the NRL Schoolboy Cup with Westfields Sports High School.

Smith represented the Australian Schoolboys in 2017.

In March 2020, Smith signed a contract upgrade to join Penrith's top 30 squad for the 2021 and 2022 seasons. He joined the top 30 squad effective immediately in August 2020, following the departures of Kaide Ellis and Jed Cartwright from the club.

=== 2021 ===
In round 13 of the 2021 NRL season, Smith made his first grade debut for Penrith against the Wests Tigers at Leichhardt Oval.

=== 2022 ===
Smith managed to only make three appearances for the Penrith first grade side in 2022. Smith spent most of the year playing for the clubs NSW Cup team. On 25 September, he played for Penrith in the clubs NSW Cup Grand Final victory over Canterbury.

=== 2023 ===
On 18 February, Smith played in Penrith's 13-12 upset loss to St Helens RFC in the 2023 World Club Challenge. Smith played 23 games for Penrith in the 2023 NRL season including the clubs 26-24 victory over Brisbane in the 2023 NRL Grand Final as Penrith won their third straight premiership.

=== 2024 ===
On 24 February, Smith played in Penrith's 2024 World Club Challenge final loss against Wigan. Smith played 27 matches with Penrith in the 2024 NRL season. On 6 October, he won the 2024 NRL Grand Final with Penrith, the fourth consecutive premiership victory for the club.

At the end of the 2024 season, Smith played one game for the Australian national rugby league team against Tonga.

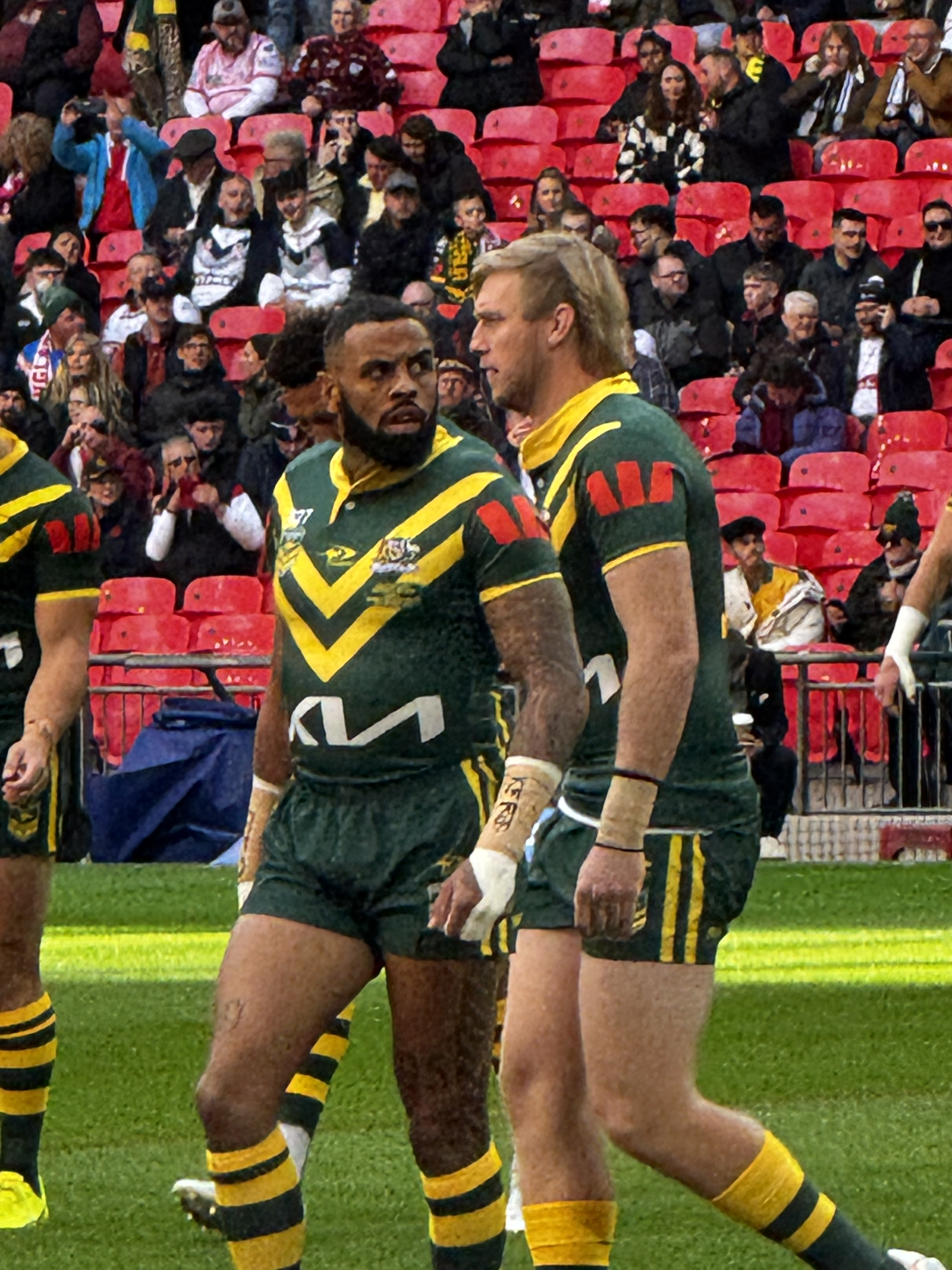
Josh Addo-Carr warming up alongside Smith for Australia in 2025

=== 2025 ===
Smith played 26 games for Penrith in the 2025 NRL season as the club finished 7th on the table. Smith played in Penrith's narrow preliminary final loss against Brisbane.

=== 2026 ===
On 19 February 2026, Penrith announced that Smith had re-signed with the club until the end of 2029. Smith played 26 matches for Penrith in the 2026 NRL season including the clubs upset preliminary final loss to Newcastle.

He was a late introduction to the Australia squad for the 2026 Rugby League World Cup, playing in Game 2 v Fiji on 25 October 2026.

== Statistics ==
Year	Team	Games	Tries	Pts
2021	Penrith Panthers	1		
2022	Penrith Panthers	3		
2023	Penrith Panthers	23		
2024	Penrith Panthers	27	4	16
2025	Penrith Panthers	26	4	16
2026	Penrith Panthers	26	4	16
2027	Penrith Panthers			
	Totals	106	12	48

== Honours ==
Representative

- Rugby League World Cup Champion: 2026
