= Sunia Turuva =

Fiji international rugby league footballer

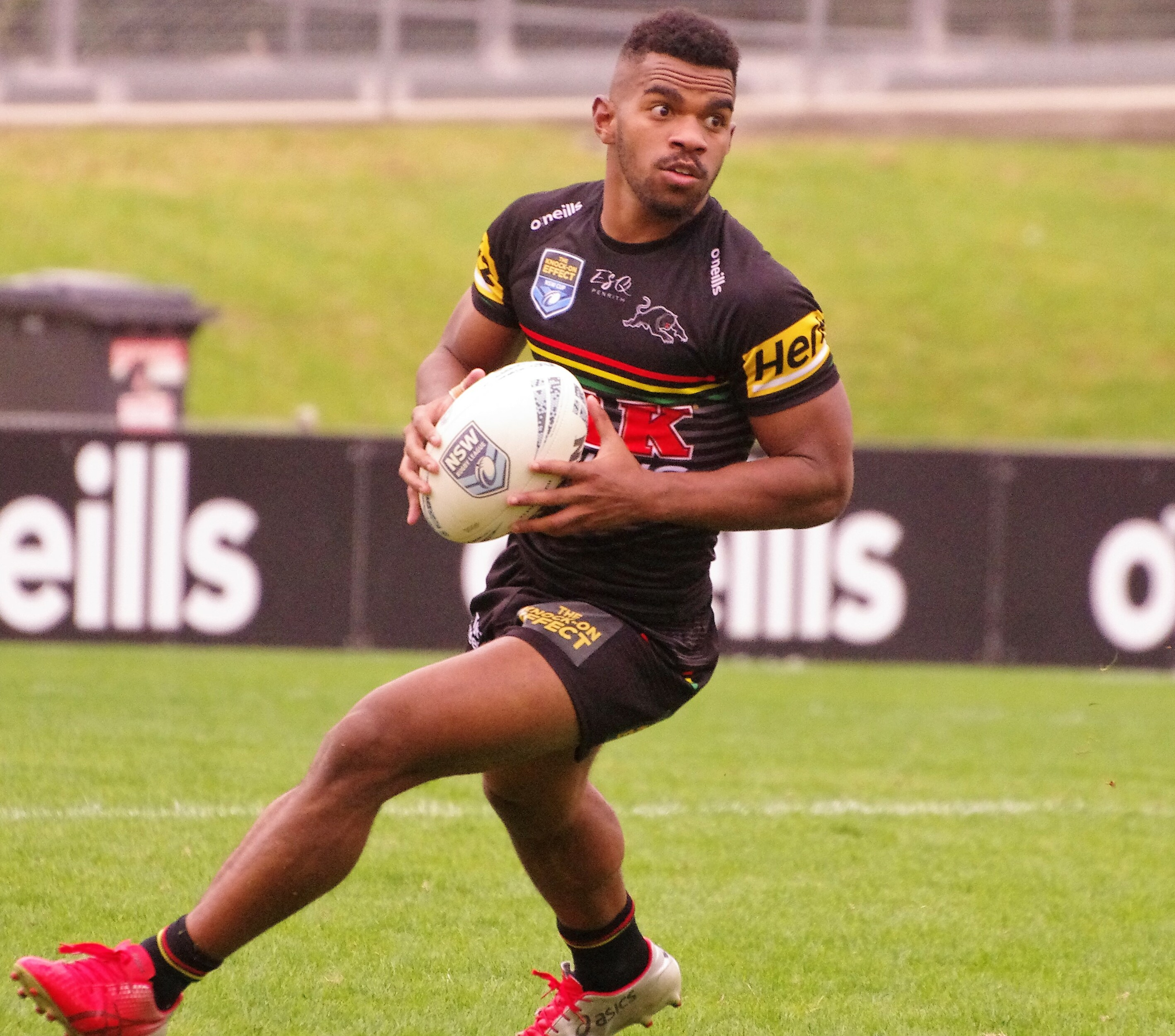

Personal information
- Full name: Sunia Turuva
- Born: 4 September 2002 (age 24) Sydney, New South Wales, Australia
- Height: 181 cm (5 ft 11 in)
- Weight: 88 kg (13 st 12 lb)

Playing information
- Position: Wing, Fullback, Centre
Club
Years	Team	Pld	T	G	FG	P
2022–24	Penrith Panthers	52	30	0	0	120
2025–	Wests Tigers	45	16	0	0	64
	Total	97	46	0	0	184
Representative
Years	Team	Pld	T	G	FG	P
2022–	Fiji	13	5	0	0	20
- Source: As of 6 November 2026
- Education: Patrician Brothers' College, Blacktown
- Relatives: Apisai Koroisau (cousin)

Sunia Turuva (born 4 September 2002) is a Fiji international rugby league footballer who plays as a winger for the Wests Tigers in the National Rugby League.

Turuva previously played for the Penrith Panthers, winning Dally M Rookie of the Year in 2023 and winning the 2023 and 2024 NRL Grand Finals.

== Background ==
Turuva played his junior rugby league for the Berala Bears, before moving to play for St.Marys Saints club in the Penrith district. Turuva played both Harold Matthews Cup (2018), and SG Ball Cup (2020) for the Penrith Panthers before being given a train and trial contract in 2021 . He was educated at Patrician Brothers' College, Blacktown.. He is the cousin of Api Koroisau

== Career ==
=== 2022 ===
Turuva made his international debut for Fiji, scoring two tries and running 252 metres in a 24–12 loss in the 2022 Pacific Test vs Papua New Guinea.

In round 21 of the 2022 NRL season, Turuva made his first grade debut for Penrith against Canberra at GIO Stadium.

Turuva spent the majority of 2022 playing for Penrith's NSW Cup team. Turuva scored two tries for Penrith in their 2022 NSW Cup Grand Final victory over Canterbury.

On 2 October, Turuva scored a try in Penrith's 44–10 victory over Norths Devils in the NRL State Championship final.

In October, he was named in the Fiji squad for the 2021 Rugby League World Cup.

In November, he was named in the 2021 RLWC Team of the Tournament.

=== 2023 ===
On 18 February, Turuva played in Penrith's 13–12 upset loss to St Helens RFC in the 2023 World Club Challenge. In round 5 of the 2023 NRL season, Turuva scored two tries for Penrith in their 53–12 victory over Canberra. In round 27, Turuva scored two tries for Penrith in their 44–12 victory over North Queensland. In the 2023 qualifying final against the New Zealand Warriors, Turuva scored two tries for Penrith in their 32–6 victory. Turuva played 26 games for Penrith in the 2023 NRL season including the clubs 26–24 victory over Brisbane in the 2023 NRL Grand Final as Penrith won their third straight premiership.

=== 2024 ===
On 24 February, Turuva played in Penrith's 2024 World Club Challenge final loss against Wigan. In round 4 of the 2024 NRL season, Turuva scored a hat-trick in Penrith's 22-16 victory over the Sydney Roosters. On Friday 26 April, Turuva signed a three-year deal with the Wests Tigers from the 2025 season onward. In round 14, Turuva scored two tries for Penrith in their 32-22 victory over Manly. In round 23, Turuva scored two tries in Penrith's 36-34 comeback victory against Parramatta. In round 26, he scored two tries for Penrith in their 34-12 victory over South Sydney. Turuva played a total of 23 games for Penrith in the 2024 NRL season including their 14-6 grand final victory over Melbourne. Turuva scored a first half try during the match.

=== 2025 ===
In round 2 of the 2025 NRL season, Turuva scored a hat-trick for the Wests Tigers in their 32-6 victory over Parramatta. One of two players to play in every game for the club, he moved from wing to fullback for 4 weeks to cover injuries. He scored 11 tries, the most for the Wests Tigers.

=== 2026 ===
On 12 May, the Wests Tigers announced that Turuva had re-signed with the club until the end of 2030. Turuva played every match for the Wests Tigers in the 2026 NRL season as the club finished 15th on the table.

== Statistics ==
Year	Team	Games	Tries	Pts
2022	Penrith Panthers	3	1	4
2023	Penrith Panthers	26	12	48
2024	Penrith Panthers	23	17	68
2025	Wests Tigers	24	11	44
2026	Wests Tigers	21	5	20
2027	Wests Tigers			
	Totals	97	46	184

source;

*denotes season competing
