= Liam Martin =

Australia international rugby league footballer

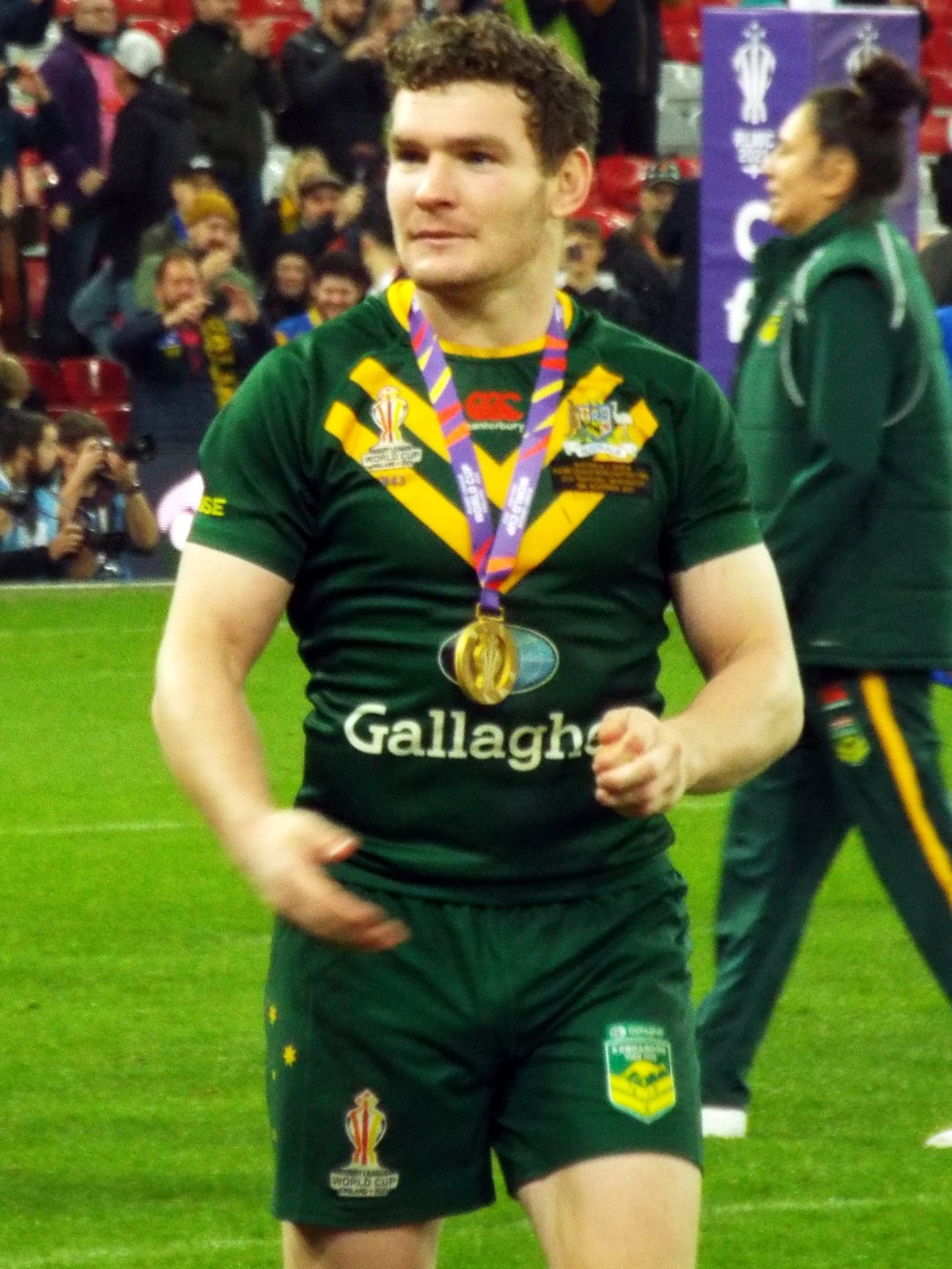

Personal information
- Full name: Liam Martin
- Born: 5 March 1997 (age 29) Temora, New South Wales, Australia
- Height: 183 cm (6 ft 0 in)
- Weight: 103 kg (16 st 3 lb)

Playing information
- Position: Second-row
Club
Years	Team	Pld	T	G	FG	P
2019–	Penrith Panthers	165	38	0	0	152
Representative
Years	Team	Pld	T	G	FG	P
2018	NSW Residents	1	0	0	0	0
2021–26	New South Wales	16	2	0	0	8
2022–	Australia	9	5	0	0	20
- Source: As of 18 November 2026
- Relatives: Trent Barrett (cousin)

Liam Martin (born 5 March 1997) is an Australian professional rugby league footballer who plays as a second-row forward for the Penrith Panthers in the National Rugby League and Australia at international level.

He won the 2021, 2022, 2023 and 2024 NRL Grand Finals with the Penrith club. He has represented the NSW Blues in State of Origin.

Known for his aggressive defense, high work rate, and ability to break tackles, Martin has been considered an integral part of the Panthers' recent success, including their multiple premiership victories.

== Early life ==
Martin was born in Temora, New South Wales, Australia. He was educated at West Wyalong High School. He is a cousin of former NRL footballer Trent Barrett. He played junior rugby league for the Temora Dragons.

== Playing career ==
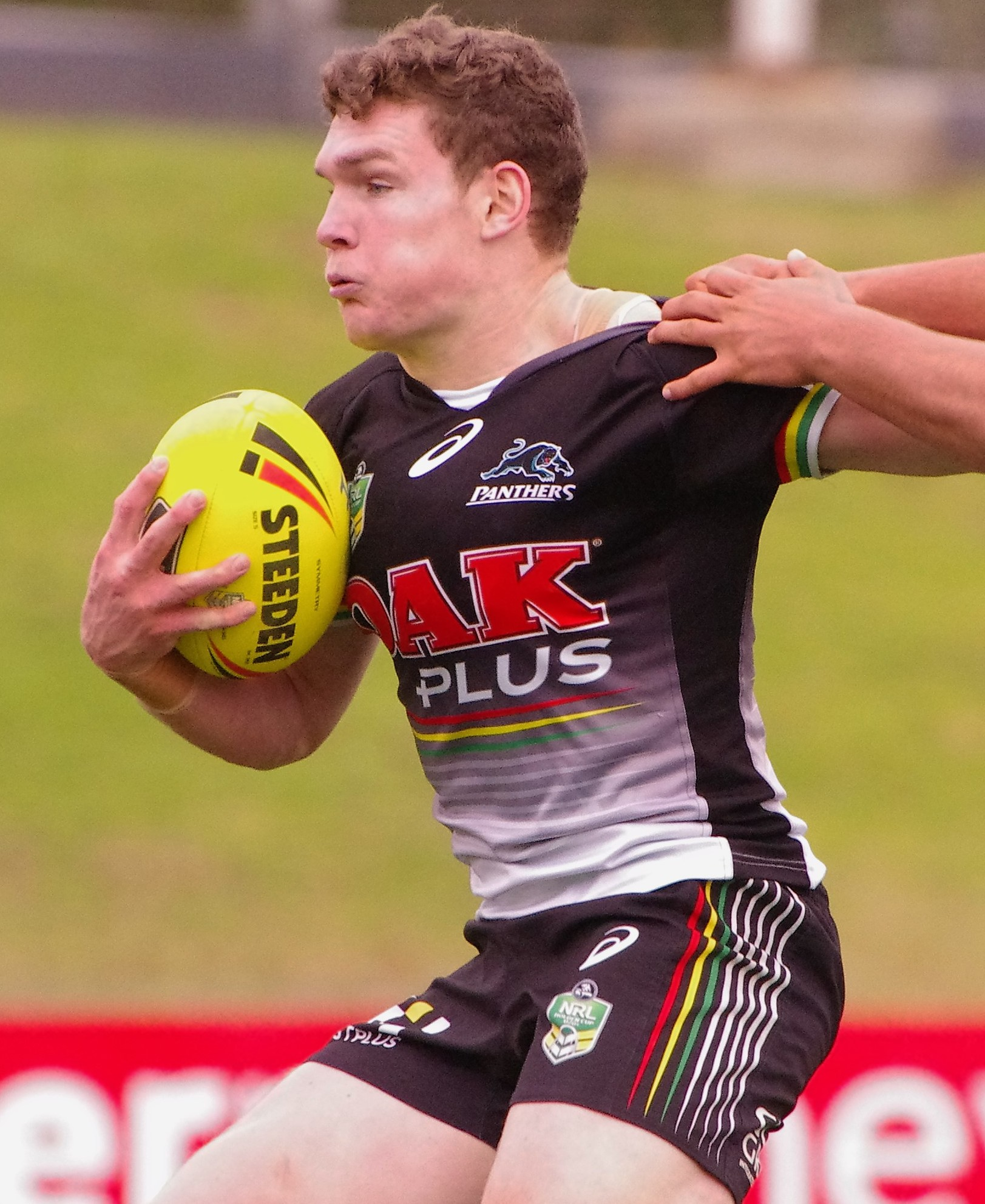
Martin playing for the Penrith Panthers in 2017

=== 2019 ===
In Round 3 of the 2019 NRL season, Martin made his NRL debut for Penrith against the Melbourne Storm. Martin scored his first try in the top grade in Round 10 against the New Zealand Warriors which ended in a 30–10 defeat at Penrith Park. Martin made a total of 16 appearances for Penrith in the 2019 NRL season as the club finished 10th on the table and missed out on the finals for the first time since 2015.

=== 2020 ===
Martin played 21 games for Penrith in the 2020 NRL season as the club won the Minor Premiership and reached the 2020 NRL Grand Final. Martin played in the grand final which Penrith lost 26–20 against Melbourne.

=== 2021 ===
On 30 May 2021, Martin was selected by New South Wales for game one of the 2021 State of Origin series. Martin made his New South Wales debut from the bench in game one of the series as New South Wales defeated Queensland 50–6. Martin played in all three games of the series which New South Wales won 2–1.

Martin played a total of 27 games for Penrith in the 2021 NRL season including the club's 2021 NRL Grand Final victory over South Sydney.

=== 2022 ===
On 29 May 2022, Martin was selected by New South Wales to play in game one of the 2022 State of Origin series.

In round 23 of the 2022 NRL season, Martin scored the winning try which sealed Penrith's second consecutive Minor Premiership in the clubs 26-22 victory over South Sydney.

Martin played 22 games for Penrith in the 2022 NRL season including the clubs 2022 NRL Grand Final victory over Parramatta.

In October he was named in the Australia squad for the 2021 Rugby League World Cup.

Martin played for Australia in their 2021 Rugby League World Cup final victory over Samoa. Martin scored a try during the first half of the game.

In November he was named in the 2021 RLWC Team of the Tournament.

=== 2023 ===
On 22 May, Martin was selected by New South Wales for game one of the 2023 State of Origin series. Martin played 18 games for Penrith in the 2023 NRL season including the clubs 26-24 victory over Brisbane in the 2023 NRL Grand Final as Penrith won their third straight premiership.

=== 2024 ===
On 24 February, Martin played in Penrith's 2024 World Club Challenge final loss against Wigan. On 26 May, Martin was selected by New South Wales ahead of the 2024 State of Origin series. Martin played in all three games as New South Wales won the series 2-1. Martin played a total of 22 games for Penrith in the 2024 NRL season. On 6 October, Martin played in the 2024 NRL Grand Final and won the Clive Churchill Medal as Penrith defeated Melbourne 14-6.

=== 2025 ===
In May, Martin was selected by New South Wales ahead of game one in the 2025 State of Origin series. He played in all three games as New South Wales lost the series 2-1. Martin played 21 games for Penrith in the 2025 NRL season as the club finished 7th on the table. Martin played in Penrith's narrow preliminary final loss against Brisbane.

=== 2026 ===
Martin played 18 games for Penrith in the 2026 NRL season as the club claimed the minor premiership. He played in the clubs shock preliminary final loss to Newcastle.

== Honours ==
Individual

- Clive Churchill Medal: 2024
- Rugby League World Cup Team of the Tournament 2021

Penrith Panthers

- NRL Premierships: 2021, 2022, 2023, 2024
- NRL Minor Premierships: 2020, 2022, 2023

New South Wales

- State of Origin Series: 2021, 2024, 2026

Australia

- World Cup: 2021, 2026

== Statistics ==
Year	Team	Games	Tries	Pts
2019	Penrith Panthers	16	2	8
2020	Penrith Panthers	21	5	20
2021	Penrith Panthers	27	3	12
2022	Penrith Panthers	22	7	28
2023	Penrith Panthers	18	6	24
2024	Penrith Panthers	22	4	16
2025	Penrith Panthers	21	3	12
2026	Penrith Panthers	2		
2027	Penrith Panthers			
	Totals	149	30	120
