= Luke Garner =

Australian rugby league footballer (born 1995)

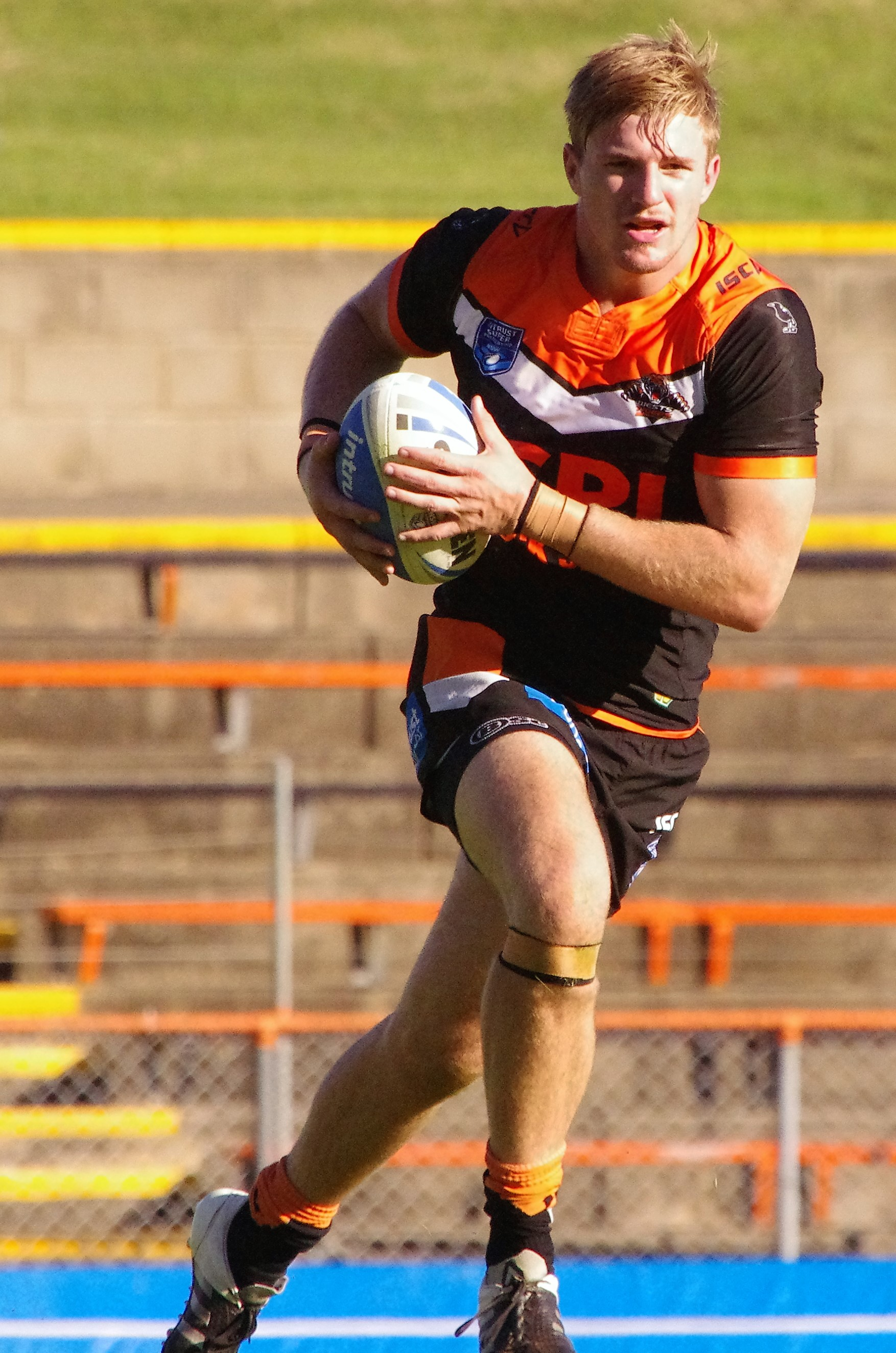

Personal information
- Born: 6 September 1995 (age 31) Gold Coast, Queensland, Australia
- Height: 190 cm (6 ft 3 in)
- Weight: 94 kg (14 st 11 lb)

Playing information
- Position: Second-row, Lock, Centre
Club
Years	Team	Pld	T	G	FG	P
2018–22	Wests Tigers	75	23	0	0	92
2023–	Penrith Panthers	70	16	0	0	64
	Total	145	39	0	0	156
Representative
Years	Team	Pld	T	G	FG	P
2018	NSW Residents	1	1	0	0	4
2022	Prime Minister's XIII	1	0	0	0	0
- Source: As of 27 September 2026

Luke Garner (born 6 September 1995) is an Australian professional rugby league footballer who plays as a second-row forward for the Penrith Panthers in the National Rugby League.

== Background ==
Garner was born in Gold Coast, Queensland, Australia.

He played his junior rugby league for the Bilambil Jets and attended Terranora Primary school and then Palm Beach Currumbin State High School before being signed by the Manly-Warringah Sea Eagles.

== Playing career ==
=== Early career ===
In 2014, Garner played for the Manly-Warringah Holden Cup (Under-20s) team and played in their 2015 Grand Final team. In 2016, he joined the Sydney Roosters playing predominantly for their Intrust Super Premiership feeder club, the Wyong Roos. In 2017, he joined the Western Suburbs Intrust Super Premiership team.

=== 2018 ===
Garner was made captain of Western Suburbs for 2018. On 24 June, Garner represented the NSW Residents team, scoring a try in the 36-20 victory. Days later he was elevated to a full-time contract with the Wests Tigers. He made his NRL debut in their Round 18 win over the St. George Illawarra Dragons. He continued on to make 6 appearances, 4 of them victories, before the end of the season.

=== 2019 ===
In the 2019 NRL season, Garner played 14 games and scored 7 tries as the Wests Tigers finished 9th on the table. On 19 November, he signed a two-year contract extension to stay with the club until the end of the 2022 NRL season. He said, "It's awesome. I debuted here at the club and to be honest I couldn't see myself playing anywhere else. I love the boys. I love Madge, I love the coaches, so very happy to stay. I look back in the off-season and came to the realisation of what happened. I was very happy with how my year went."

=== 2020 ===
In round 10, Garner scored two tries as Wests Tigers defeated Brisbane 48-0 at Leichhardt Oval. He scored another double in round 14 against Canterbury-Bankstown, and finished with 6 tries from 17 games. His 7 line-breaks were the most of any forward at the club.

=== 2021 ===
His two tries in the first 30 minutes in round 11 against the New Zealand Warriors was the third double of his career. It also equalled the club record of 15 tries for a backrower.

On 27 July, it was announced that Garner would be ruled out for an indefinite period after suffering a syndesmosis injury.

Garner played 18 matches for the Wests Tigers in the 2021 NRL season as the club finished 13th and missed the finals.

=== 2022 ===
On 24 June, Garner signed a two-year deal with Penrith starting in the 2023 NRL season. Garner played a total of 20 matches for the Wests Tigers in the 2022 NRL season as the club finished bottom of the table and claimed the Wooden Spoon for the first time.

=== 2023 ===
On 18 February, Garner played in Penrith's 13-12 loss to St Helens RFC in the 2023 World Club Challenge. Garner played 12 games for Penrith in the 2023 NRL season including the club’s 26-24 victory over Brisbane in the 2023 NRL Grand Final as Penrith won their third straight premiership.

=== 2024 ===
On 24 February, Garner played in Penrith's 2024 World Club Challenge final loss against Wigan. In round 9 of the 2024 NRL season, Garner scored two tries for Penrith in a 42-12 victory over South Sydney. In June, Garner re-signed for a further two years at the Penrith Panthers. In the qualifying final, Garner scored two tries for Penrith in their 30-10 victory over the Sydney Roosters. Garner played a total of 17 matches for Penrith in the 2024 NRL season including the clubs 2024 NRL Grand Final victory over Melbourne.

=== 2025 ===
In round 10 of the 2025 NRL season, Garner scored two tries for Penrith in their 30-30 draw with North Queensland. Garner played 23 matches for Penrith in the 2025 NRL season as the club finished 7th on the table. Garner played in Penrith's narrow preliminary final loss against Brisbane.

=== 2026 ===
On 24 March 2026, Penrith announced that Garner had re-signed with the club until the end of 2028. Garner played 18 games for Penrith in the 2026 NRL season as the club claimed the minor premiership. Garner played in the clubs shock preliminary final loss to Newcastle.

== Statistics ==
Year	Team	Games	Tries	Pts
2018	Wests Tigers	6		
2019	Wests Tigers	14	7	28
2020	Wests Tigers	17	6	24
2021	Wests Tigers	18	5	20
2022	Wests Tigers	20	5	20
2023	Penrith Panthers	12	1	4
2024	Penrith Panthers	17	7	28
2025	Penrith Panthers	23	5	20
2026	Penrith Panthers	3		
	Totals	130	36	144
