= 2022 NSW Cup season =

2022 New South Wales Cup
- Teams: 12
- Premiers: Penrith Panthers (4th title)
- Minor premiers: Newtown Jets
- Matches played: 132
- Points scored: 6,226
- Top points scorer: Adam Keighran (161)
- Player of the year: Kayal Iro
- Top try-scorer: Tom Carr (22)

The 2022 season of the Knock on Effect New South Wales Cup was the 115th season of the premier state rugby league competition in New South Wales.

== Season summary ==
The 2022 season of the Knock-On Effect New South Wales Cup commenced on the weekend of 12–13 March 2022. Teams played 24 regular competition rounds, with the top five teams qualifying for the final series in September.

Penrith Panthers won the 2022 NSW Cup Grand Final, defeating Canterbury-Bankstown Bulldogs 29–22 at CommBank Stadium to take their fourth premiership.

== Teams ==
There are 12 teams competing in the 2022 NSW Cup.

Colours	Club	Home ground(s)	Head coach
	Blacktown Workers Sea Eagles	Brookvale Oval; HE Laybutt Field	Nathan Hogan
	Canberra Raiders	GIO Stadium, Raiders Belconnen	Joel Carbone
	Canterbury-Bankstown Bulldogs	Belmore Oval, Stadium Australia	David Tangata-Toa
	Mount Pritchard Mounties	Aubrey Keech Reserve	~~Michael Potter~~ Brock Sheppard
	Newcastle Knights	McDonald Jones Stadium	Mark O'Meley
	Newtown Jets	Henson Park	Greg Matterson
	North Sydney Bears	North Sydney Oval	Jason Taylor
	Parramatta Eels	Kellyville Oval; CommBank Stadium	~~Ryan Carr~~ Jordan Rankin
	Penrith Panthers	BlueBet Stadium	Peter Wallace
	South Sydney Rabbitohs	Ironmark High Performance Centre, Stadium Australia	Dane Dorahy
	St. George Illawarra Dragons	WIN Stadium, Netstrata Jubilee Stadium	Russell Aitken
	Western Suburbs Magpies	Lidcombe Oval	Wayne Lambkin

== Regular season ==
=== Ladder ===
The New South Rugby League website maintains a competition ladder and Fixtures List (draw) for the New South Wales Cup.
The website, League Unlimited, also maintain a Ladder for the NSW Cup.

2022 NSW Cup
Pos	Team	Pld	W	D	L	B	PF	PA	PD	Pts
1	Newtown Jets	22	16	2	4	2	651	397	+254	38
2	Penrith Panthers (P)	22	16	1	5	2	655	352	+313	37
3	North Sydney Bears	22	14	1	7	2	631	447	+184	33
4	Canterbury-Bankstown Bulldogs	22	14	1	7	2	574	398	+176	33
5	Parramatta Eels	22	13	0	9	2	538	388	+150	30
6	Canberra Raiders	22	12	1	9	2	567	513	+54	29
7	South Sydney Rabbitohs	22	11	1	10	2	513	453	+60	27
8	St. George Illawarra Dragons	22	9	2	11	2	529	621	-92	24
9	Mount Pritchard Mounties	22	8	0	14	2	412	648	-236	20
10	Newcastle Knights	22	7	0	15	2	439	571	-132	18
11	Western Suburbs Magpies	22	5	1	16	2	417	722	-305	15
12	Blacktown Workers Sea Eagles	22	2	0	20	2	290	718	-428	8

== Finals series ==
Home	Score	Away	Match Information		
Home	Score	Away	Date and Time	Venue	Referee(s)
QUALIFYING AND ELIMINATION FINAL
Penrith Panthers	22 – 14	North Sydney Bears	Saturday 3 September (3:10 pm)	St Mary's Leagues Stadium	Cameron Paddy
Canterbury-Bankstown Bulldogs	18 – 6	Parramatta Eels	Saturday 3 September (5:15 pm)	St Mary's Leagues Stadium	Darian Furner
SEMI-FINALS
Newtown Jets	18 – 26	Penrith Panthers	Saturday 10 September (1:00 pm)	Netstrata Jubilee Stadium	Darian Furner
North Sydney Bears	10 – 22	Canterbury-Bankstown Bulldogs	Saturday 10 September (5:00 pm)	Netstrata Jubilee Stadium	Cameron Paddy
PRELIMINARY FINAL
Newtown Jets	26 – 28	Canterbury-Bankstown Bulldogs	Saturday 17 September (3:10 pm)	Leichhardt Oval	Darian Furner
GRAND FINAL
Penrith Panthers	29 – 22	Canterbury-Bankstown Bulldogs	Sunday 25 September (3:00 pm)	CommBank Stadium	Darian Furner

Qualifying and elimination finals
2	Penrith	22
3	North Sydney	14
4	Canterbury-Bankstown	18
5	Parramatta	6

Semi-finals
1	Newtown	18
Penrith	28
North Sydney	10
Canterbury-Bankstown	22

Preliminary final
Newtown	26
Canterbury-Bankstown	28

Grand final
Penrith	29
Canterbury-Bankstown	22

== Grand Final ==
2022 The Knock-On Effect NSW Cup Grand Final

Sunday, 25 September
15:00 AEST (UTC+10)

Penrith Panthers	29 – 22	Canterbury-Bankstown Bulldogs
Tries: 5 Turuva 7', 74'; Falls 18'; Cole 36'; Luke 60'; Goals: 4 Falls 19', 38', 61', 75' (4/5); Field goals: 1 O'Sullivan 39'	1st: 17–6; 2nd: 12–14; Report; Stats	Tries: 4 Okunbor 13', 56'; Casey 46'; Topine 66'; Goals: 3 Wakeham 14', 48', 67' (3/4)

CommBank Stadium, Sydney
Attendance: 6,210
Referee: Darian Furner
Touch judges: Liam Nicholls, Nick Beashel
Player of the Match: Soni Luke

Team details

Penrith Panthers
FB	1	Isaiah Iongi
WG	2	Christian Crichton
CE	3	Robert Jennings
CE	4	Jack Cole
WG	5	Sunia Turuva
FE	6	Kurt Falls
HB	7	Sean O'Sullivan
PR	8	Lindsay Smith
HK	9	Soni Luke
PR	10	Matt Eisenhuth
SR	11	Preston Riki
SR	12	Chris Smith
LK	13	J'maine Hopgood (c)
Interchange:
BE	14	John Faiumu
BE	15	Eddie Blacker
BE	16	Liam Henry
BE	17	Alec Susino
Reserve:
RE	18	Luke Sommerton
Coach:
Peter Wallace

Canterbury-Bankstown Bulldogs
FB	1	Creedance Toia
WG	2	Jayden Okunbor
CE	3	Paul Alamoti
CE	4	Declan Casey
WG	5	Isaac Lumelume
FE	6	Khaled Rajab
HB	7	Brandon Wakeham (c)
PR	8	Jayden Tanner
HK	9	Ryan Gray
PR	10	Josh Stuckey
SR	11	Reece Hoffman
SR	12	Jackson Topine
LK	13	Harrison Edwards
Interchange:
BE	14	Bailey Haywood
BE	15	Matt Doorey
BE	16	Kurtis Morrin
BE	17	Phil Makatoa
Reserve:
RE	22	Lipoi Hopoi
Coach:
David Tangata-Toa

== NRL State Championship ==
As premiers of the NSW Cup, the Penrith Panthers faced Queensland Cup premiers Norths Devils in the NRL State Championship match.

Sunday, 2 October
1:35pm (AEDT)

Penrith Panthers
Tries:
J'maine Hopgood 7', 71'

Soni Luke 28'
Eddie Blacker 32'
John Faiumu 45'
Robert Jennings 47'
Luke Sommerton 62'
Sunia Turuva 79'

Goals:
Kurt Falls 9', 29', 34', 63', 72'
(5/7) John Faiumu 80' (1/1)

44 – 10
1st: 18 – 0
2nd: 26 – 10
scorecard

Norths Devils
Tries:

Tony Tumusa 64'
Rashaun Denny 73'

Goals:
Connor Broadhurst 75' (1/2)

Accor Stadium, Sydney
Attendance: 11,115

== Awards ==
- Player of the Year: Kayal Iro ( Newtown Jets)

=== Team of the Year ===
Position	Nat	Winner	Club
Fullback	(Fiji)	Sunia Turuva	Penrith Panthers
Wing	(New Zealand)	Izaac Thompson	South Sydney Rabbitohs
Centre	(Australia)	Tom Jenkins	Penrith Panthers
Centre	(Cook Islands)	Kayal Iro	Newtown Jets
Wing	(Australia)	Tom Carr	North Sydney Bears
Five-eighth	(Australia)	Kade Dykes	Newtown Jets
Halfback	(Australia)	Dean Hawkins	South Sydney Rabbitohs
Prop	(Samoa)	Ata Mariota	Canberra Raiders
Hooker	(Tonga)	Soni Luke	Penrith Panthers
Prop	(Australia)	Lindsay Smith	Penrith Panthers
Second-row	(Australia)	Jack Gosiewski	St. George Illawarra Dragons
Second-row	(New Zealand)	Jackson Topine	Canterbury-Bankstown Bulldogs
Lock	(Australia)	J'maine Hopgood	Penrith Panthers

== See also ==
- 2022 New South Wales Rugby League
