= 2021 Canterbury-Bankstown Bulldogs season =

NRL rugby league season

- NRL Rank: 16th
- 2021 record: Wins: 3; draws: 0; losses: 21
- Points scored: For: 296; against: 628

Team information
- CEO: Aaron Warburton
- Coach: Trent Barrett
- Captain: Josh Jackson
- Stadium: Stadium Australia; Bankwest Stadium; Belmore Sports Ground
- Avg. attendance: 12,812
- High attendance: 23,240

Top scorers
- Tries: Nick Meaney (6)
- Goals: Jake Averillo (26)
- Points: Jake Averillo (68)
← 2020	List of seasons	2022 →

The 2021 Canterbury-Bankstown Bulldogs season was the 87th in the club's history. They were competing in the National Rugby League's 2021 Telstra Premiership, under head coach Trent Barrett who had his first season in charge of the team.

== Fixtures ==
In 2021, The Canterbury-Bankstown Bulldogs, were no friend to winning. The team consisting of Josh Jackson, Nick Meaney, Jake Averillo, and many others only were able to capture 3 wins. These 3 wins consisting of an Anzac round 18-12 upset against The Cronulla-Sutherland Sharks, A 28-6 surprise win against the Saint George Illawarra Dragons at Accor stadium, and a 38-0 farewell win in round 25 to Will Hopoate, a club favourite and Nick Meaney, a superkid. This game seemed to show a light of hope for the young squad.

=== Regular season ===
Round	Home	Score	Away	Match Information
Round	Home	Score	Away	Date and Time	Venue	Crowd
1	Newcastle Knights	32 - 16	Canterbury Bankstown Bulldogs	Fri 12 Mar, 6:00pm AEDT	McDonald Jones Stadium	19,555
2	Canterbury Bankstown Bulldogs	0 - 28	Penrith Panthers	Sat 20 Mar 3:00pm AEDT	Bankwest Stadium	5,062
3	Brisbane Broncos	24 - 0	Canterbury Bankstown Bulldogs	Sat 27 Mar 5:30pm AEDT	Suncorp Stadium	22,509
4	Canterbury Bankstown Bulldogs	0 - 38	South Sydney Rabbitohs	Fri 02 Apr 4:05pm AEDT	Stadium Australia	23,340
5	Canterbury Bankstown Bulldogs	18 - 52	Melbourne Storm	Sat 10 Apr 5:30pm AEST	Stadium Australia	5,104
6	North Queensland Cowboys	30 - 18	Canterbury Bankstown Bulldogs	Sun 18 Apr 4:05pm AEST	Queensland Country Bank Stadium	11,965
7	Cronulla Sutherland Sharks	12 - 18	Canterbury Bankstown Bulldogs	Sat 24 Apr 5:30pm AEST	Netstrata Jubilee Stadium	7,420
8	Canterbury Bankstown Bulldogs	10 - 32	Parramatta Eels	Sat 1 May 5:30pm AEST	Stadium Australia	13,273
9	St George Illawarra Dragons	32 - 12	Canterbury Bankstown Bulldogs	Sun 9 May 4:05pm AEST	Netstrata Jubilee Stadium	7,253
10	Canterbury Bankstown Bulldogs	18 - 20	Canberra Raiders	Sat 15 May 3:00pm AEST	Suncorp Stadium	30,214
11	Gold Coast Titans	30 - 20	Canterbury Bankstown Bulldogs	Sat 22 May 3:00pm AEST	Cbus Super Stadium	11,315
12	Penrith Panthers	30 - 4	Canterbury Bankstown Bulldogs	Sat 29 May 3:00pm AEST	Panthers Stadium	16,110
13		BYE
14	Canterbury Bankstown Bulldogs	28-6	St George Illawarra Dragons	Mon 14 Jun 4:00pm AEST	Stadium Australia	17,382
15	Parramatta Eels	36-10	Canterbury Bankstown Bulldogs	Sun 20 Jun 2:00pm AEST	Bankwest Stadium	17,276
16	Canterbury Bankstown Bulldogs	0-66	Manly-Warringah Sea Eagles	Sat 03 Jul 3:00pm AEST	Stadium Australia	0
17	Canterbury Bankstown Bulldogs	16-22	Sydney Roosters	Sat 10 Jul 7:35pm AEST	Bankwest Stadium	0
18	South Sydney Rabbitohs	32-24	Canterbury Bankstown Bulldogs	Sun 18 Jul 6:15pm AEST	Cbus Super Stadium	2,979
19	Canterbury Bankstown Bulldogs	44-24	Cronulla Sutherland Sharks	Sun 25 Jul 4:05pm AEST	Cbus Super Stadium	4,424
20	Canterbury Bankstown Bulldogs	6-34	Gold Coast Titans	Sun 01 Aug 2:00pm AEST	Suncorp Stadium	0
21	Canterbury Bankstown Bulldogs	16-28	Wests Tigers	Sun 08 Aug 2:00pm AEST	Cbus Super Stadium	0
22	New Zealand Warriors	24-10	Canterbury Bankstown Bulldogs	Sun 15 Aug 2:00pm AEST	Moreton Daily Stadium	3,332
23	Canterbury Bankstown Bulldogs	16-22	Newcastle Knights	Sat 21 Aug 5:30pm AEST	Cbus Super Stadium	2,343
24	Manly-Warringah Sea Eagles	36-18	Canterbury Bankstown Bulldogs	Sun 29 Aug 2:00pm AEST	Moreton Daily Stadium	4,910
25	Wests Tigers	0-38	Canterbury Bankstown Bulldogs	Sun 05 Sep 4:05pm AEST	Moreton Daily Stadium	3,104
Legend: Win Loss Draw Bye

== Ladder ==
2021 NRL season
Pos	Team	Pld	W	D	L	B	PF	PA	PD	Pts
1	Melbourne Storm	24	21	0	3	1	815	316	+499	44
2	Penrith Panthers (P)	24	21	0	3	1	676	286	+390	44
3	South Sydney Rabbitohs	24	20	0	4	1	775	453	+322	42
4	Manly-Warringah Sea Eagles	24	16	0	8	1	744	492	+252	34
5	Sydney Roosters	24	16	0	8	1	630	489	+141	34
6	Parramatta Eels	24	15	0	9	1	566	457	+109	32
7	Newcastle Knights	24	12	0	12	1	428	571	−143	26
8	Gold Coast Titans	24	10	0	14	1	580	583	−3	22
9	Cronulla-Sutherland Sharks	24	10	0	14	1	520	556	−36	22
10	Canberra Raiders	24	10	0	14	1	481	578	−97	22
11	St. George Illawarra Dragons	24	8	0	16	1	474	616	−142	18
12	New Zealand Warriors	24	8	0	16	1	453	624	−171	18
13	Wests Tigers	24	8	0	16	1	500	714	−214	18
14	Brisbane Broncos	24	7	0	17	1	446	695	−249	16
15	North Queensland Cowboys	24	7	0	17	1	460	748	−288	16
16	Canterbury-Bankstown Bulldogs	24	3	0	21	1	340	710	−370	8

== 2021 squad ==
Canterbury Bulldogs 2021 Squad
Top 30 Squad - 2021 Season			Development Players	Coaching Staff
Corey Allan – FB, CE, WG; Renouf Atoni – PR, LK; Jake Averillo (gk) – FE, CE, FB; Bailey Biondi-Odo – FE, HK; Dean Britt – PR, SR; Nick Cotric – CE, WG; Christian Crichton – WG; Matt Doorey – SR; Adam Elliott – SR, LK; Raymond Faitala-Mariner – SR	Kyle Flanagan (gk) – HB; Jack Hetherington – PR; Will Hopoate (vc) – CE, FB; Josh Jackson (c) – LK, SR; Sione Katoa – HK; Tui Katoa – WG; Lachlan Lewis – FE, HB; Jeremy Marshall-King – HK; Nick Meaney (gk) – FB, WG; Dylan Napa – PR	Ofahiki Ogden – PR; Jayden Okunbor – WG; James Roumanos – PR, SR; Ava Seumanufagai – PR; Chris Smith – SR, LK; Joe Stimson – LK, PR; Luke Thompson – PR, LK; Jackson Topine – SR, LK; Corey Waddell – SR, LK; Brandon Wakeham (gk) – HB, FE, HK	Paul Karaitiana – HB; Chris Patolo – SR, LK; Kurt Picken – CE, FB; Aaron Schoupp – CE; Extended squad: Brad Deitz – HK; Watson Heleta – FB, CE, WG; Falakiko Manu – CE	Head coach: Trent Barrett (Head Coach); Assistant Coach/es: David Furner (Assistant); Craig Sandercock (Assistant); David Tangata-Toa (Transition Coach); Other Coach/es: Mick Potter (Mounties Head Coach); Medical Professionals: Dan Ferris (Head of High Performance); Luke Portese (Strength and Conditioning Coach); Luke Inman (Chief Medical Officer); Managers: Fred Ciraldo (Team Manager); Legend: (c) Captain(s); (vc) Vice-captain(s); (gk) Goal-kicker; Updated: 6 August 2021; Source(s): Bulldogs Team Profiles

== Awards ==
=== Canterbury-Bankstown Bulldogs Awards Night ===
Due to the COVID-19 pandemic in New South Wales, the club was unable to hold a formal awards night, but awarded the following awards via social media.

- Dr George Peponis Player of the Year: Josh Jackson
- Coaches Award: Jake Averillo
- Steve Mortimer Rookie of the Year: Bailey Biondi-Odo
- Peter Warren Medal (Community Service): Raymond Faitala-Mariner
- Les Johns Clubperson of the Year: Adrian Low
