= 2022 New South Wales Rugby League season =

The New South Wales Rugby League administered several competitions during the 2022 rugby league season in Australia.

== Knock-On Effect New South Wales Cup ==
The 2022 season of the Knock-On Effect New South Wales Cup commenced on the weekend of 12–13 March 2022. Teams played 24 regular competition rounds, with the top five teams qualifying for the final series in September.

Penrith Panthers won the 2022 NSW Cup grand final, defeating Canterbury-Bankstown Bulldogs 29–22 at CommBank Stadium to take their fourth premiership in this competition.

=== Teams ===
There are 12 teams competing in the 2022 NSW Cup.

Colours	Club	Home ground(s)	Head coach
	Blacktown Workers Sea Eagles	Brookvale Oval; HE Laybutt Field	Nathan Hogan
	Canberra Raiders	GIO Stadium, Raiders Belconnen	Joel Carbone
	Canterbury-Bankstown Bulldogs	Belmore Oval, Stadium Australia	David Tangata-Toa
	Mount Pritchard Mounties	Aubrey Keech Reserve	~~Michael Potter~~ Brock Sheppard
	Newcastle Knights	McDonald Jones Stadium	Mark O'Meley
	Newtown Jets	Henson Park	Greg Matterson
	North Sydney Bears	North Sydney Oval	Jason Taylor
	Parramatta Eels	Kellyville Oval; CommBank Stadium	~~Ryan Carr~~ Jordan Rankin
	Penrith Panthers	BlueBet Stadium	Peter Wallace
	South Sydney Rabbitohs	Ironmark High Performance Centre, Stadium Australia	Dane Dorahy
	St. George Illawarra Dragons	WIN Stadium, Netstrata Jubilee Stadium	Russell Aitken
	Western Suburbs Magpies	Lidcombe Oval	Wayne Lambkin

=== Ladder ===
The New South Rugby League website maintains a competition ladder and Fixtures List (draw) for the New South Wales Cup.
The website, League Unlimited, also maintain a Ladder for the NSW Cup.

2022 NSW Cup
Pos	Team	Pld	W	D	L	B	PF	PA	PD	Pts
1	Newtown Jets	22	16	2	4	2	651	397	+254	38
2	Penrith Panthers (P)	22	16	1	5	2	655	352	+313	37
3	North Sydney Bears	22	14	1	7	2	631	447	+184	33
4	Canterbury-Bankstown Bulldogs	22	14	1	7	2	574	398	+176	33
5	Parramatta Eels	22	13	0	9	2	538	388	+150	30
6	Canberra Raiders	22	12	1	9	2	567	513	+54	29
7	South Sydney Rabbitohs	22	11	1	10	2	513	453	+60	27
8	St. George Illawarra Dragons	22	9	2	11	2	529	621	-92	24
9	Mount Pritchard Mounties	22	8	0	14	2	412	648	-236	20
10	Newcastle Knights	22	7	0	15	2	439	571	-132	18
11	Western Suburbs Magpies	22	5	1	16	2	417	722	-305	15
12	Blacktown Workers Sea Eagles	22	2	0	20	2	290	718	-428	8

=== Finals series ===
Home	Score	Away	Match Information		
Home	Score	Away	Date and Time	Venue	Referee(s)
QUALIFYING AND ELIMINATION FINAL
Penrith Panthers	22 – 14	North Sydney Bears	Saturday 3 September (3:10 pm)	St Mary's Leagues Stadium	Cameron Paddy
Canterbury-Bankstown Bulldogs	18 – 6	Parramatta Eels	Saturday 3 September (5:15 pm)	St Mary's Leagues Stadium	Darian Furner
Semi-finals
Newtown Jets	18 – 26	Penrith Panthers	Saturday 10 September (1:00 pm)	Netstrata Jubilee Stadium	Darian Furner
North Sydney Bears	10 – 22	Canterbury-Bankstown Bulldogs	Saturday 10 September (5:00 pm)	Netstrata Jubilee Stadium	Cameron Paddy
PRELIMINARY FINAL
Newtown Jets	26 – 28	Canterbury-Bankstown Bulldogs	Saturday 17 September (3:10 pm)	Leichhardt Oval	Darian Furner
GRAND FINAL
Penrith Panthers	29 – 22	Canterbury-Bankstown Bulldogs	Sunday 25 September (3:00 pm)	CommBank Stadium	Darian Furner

Qualifying and elimination finals
2	Penrith Panthers	22
3	North Sydney Bears	14
4	Canterbury Bulldogs	18
5	Parramatta Eels	6

Semi-finals
1	Newtown Jets	18
Penrith Panthers	28
North Sydney Bears	10
Canterbury Bulldogs	22

Preliminary final
Newtown Jets	26
Canterbury Bulldogs	28

Grand final
Penrith Panthers	29
Canterbury Bulldogs	22

=== Grand final ===
2022 The Knock-On Effect NSW Cup Grand Final

Sunday, 25 September
15:00 AEST (UTC+10)

Penrith Panthers	29 – 22	Canterbury-Bankstown Bulldogs
Tries: 5 Turuva 7', 74'; Falls 18'; Cole 36'; Luke 60'; Goals: 4 Falls 19', 38', 61', 75' (4/5); Field goals: 1 O'Sullivan 39'	1st: 17–6; 2nd: 12–14; Report; Stats	Tries: 4 Okunbor 13', 56'; Casey 46'; Topine 66'; Goals: 3 Wakeham 14', 48', 67' (3/4)

CommBank Stadium, Sydney
Attendance: 6,210
Referee: Darian Furner
Touch judges: Liam Nicholls, Nick Beashel
Player of the Match: Soni Luke

Team details

Penrith Panthers
FB	1	Isaiah Iongi
WG	2	Christian Crichton
CE	3	Robert Jennings
CE	4	Jack Cole
WG	5	Sunia Turuva
FE	6	Kurt Falls
HB	7	Sean O'Sullivan
PR	8	Lindsay Smith
HK	9	Soni Luke
PR	10	Matt Eisenhuth
SR	11	Preston Riki
SR	12	Chris Smith
LK	13	J'maine Hopgood (c)
Interchange:
BE	14	John Faiumu
BE	15	Eddie Blacker
BE	16	Liam Henry
BE	17	Alec Susino
Reserve:
RE	18	Luke Sommerton
Coach:
Peter Wallace

Canterbury-Bankstown Bulldogs
FB	1	Creedance Toia
WG	2	Jayden Okunbor
CE	3	Paul Alamoti
CE	4	Declan Casey
WG	5	Isaac Lumelume
FE	6	Khaled Rajab
HB	7	Brandon Wakeham (c)
PR	8	Jayden Tanner
HK	9	Ryan Gray
PR	10	Josh Stuckey
SR	11	Reece Hoffman
SR	12	Jackson Topine
LK	13	Harrison Edwards
Interchange:
BE	14	Bailey Haywood
BE	15	Matt Doorey
BE	16	Kurtis Morrin
BE	17	Phil Makatoa
Reserve:
RE	22	Lipoi Hopoi
Coach:
David Tangata-Toa

== President's Cup ==
The winners of the four conferences are scheduled to meet in a two-week knock-out tournament in September 2022.

=== Results ===
Semi-finals
Forbes	6
Maitland	52
Collegians	16
Hills	26

Grand final
Maitland	36
Hills	12

Home	Score	Away	Match Information
Home	Score	Away	Date and Time	Venue	Referee
Semi-finals
Forbes Magpies	6 – 52	Maitland Pickers	Saturday, 17 September, 2:00pm	Pioneer Oval	Jake Sutherland
Collegians Collie Dogs	16 – 26	Hills Bulls	Saturday, 17 September, 3:00pm	Collegians Sports Stadium	Cameron Paddy
Grand final
Maitland Pickers	36 – 12	Hills Bulls	Sunday, 25 September, 11:00am	CommBank Stadium	Cameron Paddy

== Harvey Norman NSW Women's Premiership ==
The 2022 season of the Harvey Norman NSWRL Women's Premiership commenced on 23 April 2022. The competition is scheduled to run for nine rounds, with Round 9 to be played on the weekend of 2–4 July 2022, and a four-team, two-week finals series to follow in July. There were nine clubs in competition.

Pos	Team	Pld	W	D	L	B	PF	PA	PD	Pts
1	North Sydney Bears	8	7	0	1	1	184	64	120	16
2	Mounties	8	5	2	1	1	170	84	86	14
3	Cronulla-Sutherland Sharks	8	5	0	3	1	123	68	55	12
4	Wests Tigers	8	5	0	3	1	140	116	24	12
5	Newcastle Knights	8	4	1	3	1	130	104	26	11
6	Central Coast Roosters	8	3	2	3	1	98	79	19	10
7	St Marys Saints	8	2	1	5	1	80	184	-104	7
8	South Sydney Rabbitohs	8	1	2	5	1	106	178	-72	6
9	Wentworthville Magpies	8	0	0	8	1	74	228	-154	2

Source: The website, League Unlimited, maintained a Women's Premiership ladder.
The New South Wales Rugby League website hosts the Harvey Norman NSW Women's Premiership draw.

Final Series

Semi-finals
1	North Sydney Bears	10
4	Wests Tigers	24
2	Mounties	4
3	Cronulla Sutherland Sharks	22

Grand final
3	Cronulla Sutherland Sharks	20
4	Wests Tigers	21

Semi-finals

Saturday, 9 July 2022
12:15pm (AEST)

Mounties	4 — 22	Cronulla Sutherland Sharks
Tries: 1 Simaima Taufa (32'); Goals: nil	HT: 4 – 10; Reports	Tries: 4 Sam Bremner (12'); Zali Fay (23'); Maddie Studdon (57'); Quincy Dodd (69'); Goals: 3 Maddie Studdon 3 (14', 59', 65' pen)

Netstrata Jubilee Stadium, Carlton, Sydney
Referee: Dillian Wells

Saturday, 9 July 2022
2:00pm (AEST)

North Sydney Bears	10 — 24	Wests Tigers
Tries: 2 Raecene McGregor (9'); Jamilee Bright (56'); Goals: 1 Kirra Dibb 1/2 (56')	HT: 10 – 16; Reports	Tries: 5 Tess Staines 3 (23', 25', 68'); Jessica Sergis (18'); Losana Lutu (43'); Goals: 2 Tayla Preston 2/5 (19', 24')

Netstrata Jubilee Stadium, Carlton, Sydney
Referee: Luke Saldern

Grand final

Saturday, 16 July 2022
2:00pm (AEST)

Cronulla Sutherland Sharks	20 — 21	Wests Tigers
Tries: 4 Tiana Penitani (17'); Talei Holmes (43'); Zali Fay (54'); Sam Bremner (74'); Goals: 2 Maddie Studdon 2/5 (31' pen, 75')	HT: 6 – 10; FT: 14 – 14; ET-HT 20 – 14; ET-HT 20 – 20; Match Stats; Reports	Tries: 4 Keele Browne 2 (21', 79'); Jessica Sergis (35'); Josephine Lenaz 47'; Goals: 2 Emily Curtain 2/4 (35', 80'); Field goals: 1 Emily Curtain (82')

Campbelltown Stadium, Sydney
Referee: Dillian Wells
Player of the Match: Emily Curtain

Top Point Scorers
Player	Team	M	T	G	FG	Points
Tess Staines	Wests Tigers	9	12	0		48
Kirra Dibb	North Sydney Bears	7	2	18		44
Maddie Studdon	Cronulla Sharks	9	2	17	1	43
Matilda Power	Mounties	9	4	8		32
Tayla Preston	Wests Tigers	10	2	11		30
Cortez Te Pou	North Sydney Bears	5	7	0		28
Emily Curtain	Wests Tigers	10	2	9	1	27

Top Try Scorers
Player	Team	M	Tries
Tess Staines	Wests Tigers	9	12
Cortez Te Pou	North Sydney Bears	5	7
Gayle Broughton	Mounties	8	6
Haylee Hifo	Mounties	7	6
Pier Pritchard	North Sydney Bears	7	5
Luisa Yaranamua	North Sydney Bears	7	5
Zali Fay	Cronulla Sharks	7	5
Keele Browne	Wests Tigers	10	5

== Jersey Flegg ==
The 2022 season of the Jersey Flegg Cup for Under 21 males commenced on the weekend of 12–13 March 2022. Twenty-four regular competition rounds ran up to 27–28 August, followed by a final series. The grand final is scheduled for Sunday, 25 September 2022.

The website, League Unlimited, maintained a Jersey Flegg ladder.
The New South Wales Rugby League website hosts the Jersey Flegg Cup draw.

2022 Jersey Flegg Cup
Pos	Team	Pld	W	D	L	B	PF	PA	PD	Pts
1	Sydney Roosters	22	16	0	6	2	694	316	+378	36
2	Newcastle Knights	22	15	0	6	2	485	378	+107	34
3	Penrith Panthers (P)	22	13	0	9	2	600	432	+168	30
4	St. George Illawarra Dragons	22	12	2	8	2	500	412	+88	30
5	Wests Tigers	22	13	0	9	2	486	450	+36	30
6	Cronulla-Sutherland Sharks	22	12	1	9	2	557	500	+57	29
7	Canberra Raiders	22	11	0	11	2	515	606	-91	26
8	Canterbury-Bankstown Bulldogs	22	10	1	10	2	440	469	-21	25
9	Parramatta Eels	22	10	0	12	2	488	476	+12	22
10	Manly Warringah Sea Eagles	22	9	0	13	2	513	636	-123	20
11	Victoria Thunderbolts	22	6	0	16	2	388	736	-348	16
12	South Sydney Rabbitohs	22	3	0	18	2	396	646	-250	10

Final Series

Qualifying final
2	Newcastle Knights	22
3	Penrith Panthers	16
4	St. George Illawarra Dragons	26
5	Wests Tigers	22

Major semi-final
1	Sydney Roosters	22
2	Newcastle Knights	24
Minor semi-final
Penrith Panthers	36
St. George Illawarra Dragons	26

Preliminary final
Sydney Roosters	22
Penrith Panthers	27

Grand final
Newcastle Knights	18
Penrith Panthers	19

2022 Jersey Flegg Cup grand final

Sunday, 25 September
1:00 pm AEST (UTC+10:00)

Newcastle Knights	18 – 19	Penrith Panthers
Tries: 3 Thomas Cant (19') 1 Fletcher Sharpe (40') 1 Kurt Donogue (58') 1 Goals: 3 Thomas Cant (20', 42', 60') 3/3	HT: 6 – 6 FT: 18 – 18; ET: 18 – 19; Report; Stats	Tries: 3; 1 Daeon Amituanuai (9'); 1 Mavrik Geyer (64'); 1 Samuel Lane (68'); Goals: 3 Niwhai Puru (11', 64', 69'); Field goals: 1 Isaiya Katoa (83')

CommBank Stadium
Referee: Keiren Irons
Touch judges: Patrick Mackey, Cameron Mitchell

== Sydney Shield ==
The 2022 season of the Sydney Shield commenced on 19 April 2022. The competition ran for 19 rounds, with Round 19 played on 6 August. A final series followed. The grand final was held on Sunday, 4 September 2022. There were seven teams in competition.

- Hills District Bulls
- Moorebank Rams
- Penrith Brothers
- Ryde-Eastwood Hawks
- St Marys Saints
- Sydney Roosters
- Wentworthville Magpies

The website, League Unlimited, maintained a Sydney Shield ladder.
The website, Play Rugby League hosted the Sydney Shield draw.

Final Series

Qualifying final
2	Hills District Bulls	38
3	Ryde-Eastwood Hawks	8
4	Sydney Roosters	17
5	Penrith Brothers	20

Major semi-final
1	St Marys Saints	26
2	Hills District Bulls	16
Minor semi-final
3	Ryde-Eastwood Hawks	14
5	Penrith Brothers	36

Preliminary final
2	Hills District Bulls	12
5	Penrith Brothers	14

Grand final
1	St Marys Saints	36
5	Penrith Brothers	12

Grand final

Sunday, 4 September 2022
1pm (AEST)

St Marys Saints	36 — 12	Penrith Brothers
Tries: 6 Mason Iaria 2 Kaleb Farr 2 Immanuel Tagaloamatua; Adam Runchel; Goals: 6 Immanuel Tagaloamatua 5 Henry Seumanu 1 (pen)	HT: 24–6; Highlights; Report	Tries: 2 Frank Toomalatai; Lufusi Tapaatoutai; Goals: 2 Jermaine Ma'u 2

Netsrata Jubilee Stadium, Sydney
Referee: Daniel Luttringer
Player of the Match: Immanuel Tagaloamatua

== NSW Men's Country Championships ==
The 2022 Men's Country Championship was won by the Illawarra South Coast Dragons. The Dragons were coached by Wade Forrester and captained by Nathan Ford.
There were ten teams in competition, with the draw split into two groups of five with a cross-over match played in each of the two rounds. The competition ran from 26 February to 3 April 2022.
Ladder

Pos	Team	Pld	W	D	L	B	PF	PA	PD	Pts
1	Northern Rivers Titans	2	2	0	0	0	112	24	88	4
2	Monaro Colts	2	2	0	0	0	104	24	80	4
3	Illawarra South Coast	2	2	0	0	0	56	16	40	4
4	Northern Tigers	2	1	0	1	0	72	52	20	2
5	Riverina Bulls	2	1	0	1	0	32	28	4	2
6	Western Rams	2	1	0	1	0	58	76	-18	2
7	Central Coast Roosters	2	1	0	1	0	26	48	-22	2
8	North Coast Bulldogs	2	0	0	2	0	22	66	-44	0
9	Macarthur Wests Tigers	2	0	0	2	0	24	74	-50	0
10	Newcastle Maitland Region Knights	2	0	0	2	0	30	128	-98	0

Source: Play Rugby League - Men's Country Championship

Final Series

Semi-finals
1	Northern Rivers Titans	40
4	Northern Tigers	14
2	Monaro Colts	4
3	Illawarra South Coast Dragons	18

Grand final
Northern Rivers Titans	16
Illawarra South Coast Dragons	26

Grand final

Sunday, 3 April 2022
5pm (AET)

Northern Rivers Titans	16 — 26	Illawarra South Coast
Tries: 3 Rhys Riches; Robert Shepherd; Kalani Hensby; Goals: 2 Oliver Regan 2	HT: 0–16; Report; Highlights	Tries: 5 Hamish Holland; Callan Thistlethwaite; Jake Brisbane; Jake Kamire; Blair Grant; Goals: 3 Blair Grant 3

St Marys League Stadium, Sydney

== NSW Women's Country Championships ==
The 2022 Women's Country Championship was won by the Central Coast Roosters. The Roosters were captained by Jaz Wolfe.
There were ten teams in competition, with the draw split into two groups of five with a cross-over match played in each of the two rounds. The competition ran from 26 February to 3 April 2022.

Ladder

Pos	Team	Pld	W	D	L	B	PF	PA	PD	Pts
1	Newcastle Maitland Region Knights	2	2	0	0	0	70	14	56	4
2	Central Coast Roosters	2	2	0	0	0	54	0	54	4
3	Illawarra South Coast	2	2	0	0	0	60	8	52	4
4	Macarthur Wests Tigers	2	2	0	0	0	30	18	12	4
5	Monaro Colts	2	1	0	1	0	36	26	10	2
6	Western Rams	2	1	0	1	0	27	44	-17	2
7	Riverina Bulls	2	0	0	2	0	18	30	-12	0
8	Northern Tigers	2	0	0	2	0	20	47	-27	0
9	Northern Rivers Titans	2	0	0	2	0	10	66	-56	0
10	North Coast Bulldogs	2	0	0	2	0	0	72	-72	0

Source: Play Rugby League - Women's Country Championship

Finals series

Semi-finals
1	Newcastle Maitland Knights	32
4	Macarthur Wests Tigers	0
2	Central Coast Roosters	8
3	Illawarra South Coast Dragons	4

Grand final
Newcastle Maitland Knights	6
Central Coast Roosters	14

Grand final

Sunday, 3 April 2022
3pm (AET)

Newcastle Maitland Region Knights	6—14	Central Coast Roosters
Tries: 1 Ebony Ford; Goals: 1 Brooke Carter	HT: 0–12; Report; Highlights	Tries: 2 Ella Buteux; Shannon Rose; Goals: 2 Jessica Gentle 2 Courtney Jago

St Marys League Stadium, Sydney
Player of the Match: Shannon Rose

== SG Ball Cup ==
The 2022 season S. G. Ball Cup for Under 19 males was won by the Penrith Panthers. The Panthers were coached by Scott Thompson and were captained by Mason Teague. Joshua Wong from the Sydney Roosters was named Player of the Series.
There were fifteen teams in competition, which was played over nine rounds. The draw was arranged so that each team received a bye. A full round of matches (Round 5) was washed out, with the seven games scheduled designated as a nil-all draw. A Round 6 match between Balmain Tigers and Sydney Roosters was deemed a draw after an electrical storm curtailed play early in the second half, when the score was 6–12. The competition ran from 5 February to 30 April 2022.

Ladder

Pos	Under 19 Team	Pld	W	D	WO	L	B	PF	PA	PD	Pts
1	Sydney Roosters	7	6	1	1	0	1	196	60	136	16
2	Newcastle Knights	7	6	0	1	1	1	266	88	178	15
3	Balmain Tigers	7	5	1	1	1	1	148	124	24	14
4	Penrith Panthers	7	5	0	1	2	1	228	110	118	13
5	Illawarra Steelers	7	5	0	1	2	1	176	128	48	13
6	Canterbury Bulldogs	7	4	0	1	3	1	166	150	16	11
7	Cronulla-Sutherland Sharks	7	4	0	1	3	1	180	168	12	11
8	Manly Warringhah Sea Eagles	7	4	0	1	3	1	170	162	8	11
9	Canberra Raiders	7	3	0	1	4	1	156	180	-24	9
10	South Sydney Rabbitohs	7	3	0	1	4	1	158	186	-28	9
11	Parramatta Eels	7	2	1	1	4	1	102	134	-32	8
12	Western Suburbs Magpies	7	2	1	1	4	1	144	184	-40	8
13	North Sydney Bears	7	1	0	1	6	1	84	192	-108	5
14	St George Dragons	7	1	0	1	6	1	58	224	-166	5
15	Victoria Thunderbolts	8	0	0	0	8	1	132	274	-142	2

Source: NSWRL Website - SG Ball ladder

Final Series

Elimination finals
3	Balmain Tigers	14
6	Canterbury Bulldogs	16
4	Penrith Panthers	24
5	Illawarra Steelers	6

Semi-finals
1	Sydney Roosters	32
6	Canterbury Bulldogs	12
2	Newcastle Knights	6
4	Penrith Panthers	25

Grand final
1	Sydney Roosters	20
4	Penrith Panthers	22

Grand final

Saturday, 30 April 2022
2.30pm (AET)

Sydney Roosters	20—22	Penrith Panthers
Tries: 4 Xavier Chatfield-Mooka (5'); Benjamin Dufficy (7'); Cassius Tia (13'); Benaiah Ioelu (24'); Goals: 2 Benjamin Dufficy 2 (9', 25')	HT: 20–0; Report; Highlights	Tries: 4 Jesse McLean 2 (47', 66'); Mason Teague (56'); Angelis Hotere-Papalii (58'); Goals: 3 Keagan Russell-Smith 3 (56', 59', 68')

CommBank Stadium, Parramatta
Referee: Ethan Klein
Player of the Match: Isaiya Katoa

== Harold Matthews Cup ==
The 2022 season Harold Matthews Cup for Under 17 males was won by the Western Suburbs Magpies. The Magpies were coached by Robbie Mears and were captained by Kit Laulilii.
There were fifteen teams in competition, which was played over nine rounds. The draw was arranged so that each team received a bye. A full round of matches (Round 5) was washed out, with the seven games scheduled designated as a nil-all draw. The competition ran from 5 February to 30 April 2022.

Ladder

Pos	Under 17 Team	Pld	W	D	WO	L	B	PF	PA	PD	Pts
1	Western Suburbs Magpies	8	7	0	1	0	1	194	86	108	17
2	Sydney Roosters	8	6	0	1	1	1	232	104	128	15
3	Penrith Panthers	8	6	0	1	1	1	182	102	80	15
4	Cronulla-Sutherland Sharks	8	5	0	1	2	1	160	70	90	13
5	Parramatta Eels	8	5	0	1	2	1	162	98	64	13
6	Canberra Raiders	8	4	0	1	3	1	188	124	64	11
7	Balmain Tigers	8	3	0	1	4	1	120	140	-20	9
8	Illawarra Steelers	8	2	1	1	4	1	120	176	-56	8
9	Manly Sea Eagles	8	2	1	1	4	1	106	162	-56	8
10	St George Dragons	8	2	1	1	4	1	102	164	-62	8
11	South Sydney Rabbitohs	8	2	1	1	4	1	86	164	-78	8
12	Newcastle Knights	8	2	0	1	5	1	118	178	-60	7
13	Canterbury Bulldogs	8	2	0	1	5	1	92	162	-70	7
14	North Sydney Bears	8	1	1	1	5	1	92	158	-66	6
15	Central Coast Roosters	8	1	1	0	6	1	116	182	-66	5

Source: NSWRL Website - Harold Matthews Cup ladder

Final Series

Elimination finals
3	Penrith Panthers	18
6	Canberra Raiders	24
4	Cronulla Sharks	28
5	Parramatta Eels	4

Semi-finals
1	Western Suburbs Magpies	20
6	Canberra Raiders	16
2	Sydney Roosters	12
4	Cronulla Sharks	14

Grand final
1	Western Suburbs Magpies	42
4	Cronulla Sharks	16

Grand final

Saturday, 30 April 2022
12.45pm (AET)

Western Suburbs Magpies	42—16	Cronulla-Sutherland Sharks
Tries: 8 Tajh Colquhoun 3 (15', 40', 53'); Kit Laulilii 2 (18', 23'); Kit Laulilii (18'); Lachlan Galvin (47'); Nathaniel Gallagher (50'); Goals: 5 Tajh Colquhoun 5 (20', 25', 49', 52', 55')	HT: 18–6; Reports; Highlights	Tries: 3 Ashton Simmonds 2 (44', 57'); Kurt Montgomery (10'); Goals: 2 Chevy Stewart (12'); Bryce Sait (58')

CommBank Stadium, Parramatta
Referee: Benjamin Seppala
Player of the Match: Jordan Miller

== Tarsha Gale Cup ==
The 2022 season Tarsha Gale Cup for Under 19 females was won by the Indigenous Academy Sydney Roosters. The Roosters were coached by Blake Cavallaro and captained by Tayla Montgomery. Otesa Pule from the Roosters was named Player of the Series.
There were twelve teams in competition, which was played over nine rounds. The draw was arranged so that each team received a bye. A full round of matches (Round 5) was washed out, with the five games scheduled designated as a nil-all draw. Two other matches were postponed due to wet weather and subsequently deemed a nil-all draw when they could not be rescheduled. The competition ran from 5 February to 30 April 2022.

Ladder

Pos	Under 19 Team	Pld	W	D	WO	L	B	PF	PA	PD	Pts
1	Indigenous Academy Sydney Roosters	7	7	0	1	0	1	194	34	160	17
2	Parramatta Eels	7	6	0	1	1	1	194	72	122	15
3	Newcastle Knights	6	5	0	2	1	1	208	56	152	14
4	Wests Tigers	7	5	0	1	2	1	132	106	26	13
5	Illawarra Steelers	7	4	1	1	2	1	146	102	44	12
6	St George Dragons	6	4	0	2	2	1	132	118	14	12
7	Canterbury Bulldogs	7	2	1	1	4	1	98	140	-42	8
8	Penrith Panthers	6	2	0	2	4	1	102	148	-46	8
9	Cronulla-Sutherland Sharks	7	2	0	1	5	1	68	126	-58	7
10	Canberra Raiders	8	2	0	0	6	1	102	218	-116	6
11	North Sydney Bears	7	1	0	1	6	1	78	158	-80	5
12	South Sydney Rabbitohs	7	0	0	1	7	1	38	214	-176	3

Source: NSWRL website - Tarsha Gale Cup ladder

Final Series

Elimination finals
4	Wests Tigers	8
5	Illawarra Steelers	4
3	Newcastle Knights	22
6	St George Dragons	20

Semi-finals
1	Indigenous Academy Roosters	22
4	Wests Tigers	8
2	Parramatta Eels	14
3	Newcastle Knights	16

Grand final
1	Indigenous Academy Roosters	12
3	Newcastle Knights	10

Grand final

Saturday, 30 April 2022
11.00am (AET)

Indigenous Academy Sydney Roosters	12—10	Newcastle Knights
Tries: 2 Zoe Cass (24'); Otesa Pule (39'); Goals: 2 Ally Bullman 2 (26', 41')	HT: 6–0; Reports; Highlights	Tries: 2 Sophie Clancy (31'); Kasey Gaukroger (35'); Goals: 1 Sophie Clancy (33')

CommBank Stadium, Parramatta
Referee: Blake Williams
Player of the Match: Otesa Pule

Top Point Scorers
Player	Team	M	T	G	FG	Points
Alysha Bell	Parramatta Eels	7	2	25		58
Otesa Pule	Indigenous Academy Sydney Roosters	9	13			52
Jesse Southwell	Newcastle Knights	4	3	20		52
Sophie Clancy	Newcastle Knights	7	8	6		44
Salma Nour	Illawarra Steelers	7	10			40
Jada Taylor	Indigenous Academy Sydney Roosters	6	9			36
Mia Middleton	Newcastle Knights	9	9			36
Ally Bullman	Indigenous Academy Sydney Roosters	9	4	10		36
Luisa Yaranamua	St George Dragons	6	5	7		34
Taytana Ifopo	Penrith Panthers	5	4	8		32
Makayla Morris	Canberra Raiders	8	2	11		30
Lily Rogan	Illawarra Steelers	8	3	8		28
Rosemarie Beckett	Parramatta Eels	7	6	1		26
Losana Lutu	Wests Tigers	8	5	3		26
Monalisa Soliola	Canterbury Bulldogs	6	4	5		26
Annabel McDonald	Illawarra Steelers	5	3	7		26

Top Try Scorers
Player	Team	M	Tries
Otesa Pule	Indigenous Academy Sydney Roosters	9	13
Salma Nour	Illawarra Steelers	7	10
Jada Taylor	Indigenous Academy Sydney Roosters	6	9
Mia Middleton	Newcastle Knights	9	9
Sophie Clancy	Newcastle Knights	7	8
Georgia Willey	Canberra Raiders	8	6
Rosemarie Beckett	Parramatta Eels	7	6
Tori Brazier	Newcastle Knights	9	6
Amber Johnstone	Wests Tigers	9	5
Angel Mikaere	St George Dragons	6	5
Jacinta Tui	Parramatta Eels	7	5
Losana Lutu	Wests Tigers	8	5
Luisa Yaranamua	St George Dragons	6	5
Kasey Gaukroger	Newcastle Knights	8	5

== Laurie Daley Cup ==
The 2022 season Laurie Daley Cup was won by the Illawarra South Coast Dragons.The Dragons were coached by Peter Hooper and were captained by Taj Ford. Dragons hooker Kyan Hjaltason was named Player of the Match.
There were ten teams in competition, with the draw split into two groups of five with a cross-over match played in each of the five rounds. The competition ran from 5 February to 3 April 2022.

Ladder

Pos	Under 18 Team	Pld	W	D	L	B	PF	PA	PD	Pts
1	North Coast Bulldogs	5	4	1	0	0	162	112	50	9
2	Central Coast Roosters	5	4	0	1	0	170	64	106	8
3	Illawarra South Coast Dragons	5	4	0	1	0	158	74	84	8
4	Macarthur Wests Tigers	5	4	0	1	0	96	88	8	8
5	Newcastle Maitland Region Knights	5	3	1	1	0	178	76	102	7
6	Western Rams	5	3	0	2	0	120	96	24	6
7	Northern Rivers Titans	5	1	0	4	0	98	182	-84	2
8	Monaro Colts	5	1	0	4	0	60	184	-124	2
9	Riverina Bulls	5	0	0	5	0	76	144	-68	0
10	Northern Tigers	5	0	0	5	0	88	186	-98	0

Source: NSWRL website - Laurie Daley Cup ladder

Finals series

Semi-finals
1	North Coast Bulldogs	34
4	Macarthur Wests Tigers	16
2	Central Coast Roosters	12
3	Illawarra South Coast Dragons	18

Grand final
1	North Coast Bulldogs	20
3	Illawarra South Coast Dragons	40

Grand final

Sunday, # April 2022
12.00pm (AET)

North Coast Bulldogs	20—42	Illawarra South Coast Dragons
Tries: 4 Mhalikai Mercy (26'); Shane Davis-Caldwell (39'); Jack Margetts (42'); Tyrese Dungay (45'); Goals: 2 Shane Davis-Caldwell 2 (41', 47')	HT: 4–18; Reports; Highlights	Tries: 7 Taj Ford 2 (15', 60'); Kane Graham (7'); Wil Patison (34'); Kyle McCarthy (51'); Jack Piccirilli (57'); Zakariya Maarbani (68'); Goals: 5 Taj Ford 5 (9', 17', 34', 58', 64')

St Marys League Stadium, Sydney
Player of the Match: Kyan Hjaltason

== Andrew Johns Cup ==
The 2022 season Andrew Johns Cup was won by the Northern Rivers Titans.The Titans were coached by Shaun Davison and were captained by Zane Harrison.
There were ten teams in competition, with the draw split into two groups of five with a cross-over match played in each of the five rounds. The competition ran from 5 February to 3 April 2022.

Ladder

Pos	Under 16 Team	Pld	W	D	L	B	PF	PA	PD	Pts
1	Illawarra South Coast Dragons	5	4	0	1	0	150	80	70	8
2	Northern Tigers	5	4	0	1	0	116	68	48	8
3	Macarthur Wests Tigers	5	3	0	2	0	130	94	36	6
4	Northern Rivers Titans	5	3	0	2	0	88	88	0	6
5	Central Coast Roosters	5	2	1	2	0	94	74	20	5
6	Monaro Colts	5	2	1	2	0	104	102	2	5
7	North Coast Bulldogs	5	2	1	2	0	92	104	-12	5
8	Riverina Bulls	5	2	0	3	0	84	132	-48	4
9	Newcastle Maitland Region Knights	5	1	1	3	0	82	96	-14	3
10	Western Rams	5	0	0	5	0	70	172	-102	0

Source: NSWRL website - Andrew Johns Cup ladder

Finals series

Semi-finals
1	Illawarra South Coast Dragons	16
4	Northern Rivers Titans	20
2	Northern Tigers	16
3	Macarthur Wests Tigers	22

Grand final
4	Northern Rivers Titans	24
3	Macarthur Wests Tigers	22

Grand final

Sunday, 3 April 2022
10.00am (AET)

Macarthur Wests Tigers	22—24	Northern Rivers Titans
Tries: 4 Sonny Edwards-Moeke (1'); Levi McGuinness (16'); Byronn Laupepa (49'); Riley Oitmann (52'); Goals: 3 Levi McGuinness 2 (50', 53'); Noah McKenzie 3'	HT: 10–14; Reports	Tries: 5 Jackson Bennett (12'); Harry Chadburn (19'); Hudson Towell (27'); Billy Kilduff (45'); Ricco Waititi (59'); Goals: 2 Callum Bowles 2 (29', 59')

St Marys League Stadium, Sydney

== City v Country ==
The NSWRL has organised a series of City versus Country matches for the weekend of 14–15 May 2022. Playing squads were announced on 4 May 2022.NSWRL

Format		Country	Time (AET)	Date	Venue
Under 16s males	36	12	10.30am	Sat 14 May	Brookvale Oval, Brookvale
Under 18s males	42	18	12.10pm	Sat 14 May	Brookvale Oval, Brookvale
Women's Open Age	6	14	2.00pm	Sat 14 May	Brookvale Oval, Brookvale
Wheelchair rugby league	30	26	4.00pm	Sat 14 May	Niagara Park Stadium, Central Coast
Physical disability rugby league	4	10	9.45am	Sun 15 May	Leichhardt Oval
Women's Police	0	14	11.00am	Sun 15 May	Leichhardt Oval
Men's Police	14	24	12.25pm	Sun 15 May	Leichhardt Oval
Men's Open Age	34	36	2.00pm	Sun 15 May	Leichhardt Oval

=== City versus Country Women ===
Saturday, 14 May 2022.
2.00pm (AET)

City	6 — 14	Country
Tries: 1 Andie Robinson; Goals: 1 Maddie Studdon	HT: 6–6; Report	Tries: 2 Vanessa Foliaki; Caitlan Johnston; Goals: 3 Melanie Howard 2 Kirra Dibb 1

Brookvale Oval, Brookvale
Referee: Jake Sutherland
Player of the Match: Caitlan Johnston

=== Open Women's City Team ===
The City squad for the 2022 Open Women's match against Country. The team is coached by Darrin Borthwick.

J#	Player	2022 State Club	Position(s)	City						NRLW										2021 State	Interstate	Tests	All Stars
J#	Player	2022 State Club	Position(s)	Dbt	S	M	T	G	Pts	Dbt	S	M	T	G	Pts	2018	2019	2020	2021	2021 State	Interstate	Tests	All Stars
1	Jaime Chapman	Tweed Heads	Fullback	—	1	1	0	0	0	2020	2	9	3	0	12	—	—	3m	6m 3t	4m 1t	—	—	2m 2t
2	Taina Naividi	Mounties	Wing	2021	2	2	0	0	0	2021	1	5	0	0	0	—	—	—	5m	10m 9t	—	—	—
3	Mareva Swann	Mounties	Centre	—	1	1	0	0	0	—	0	0	0	0	0	—	—	—	—	8m 6t	—	—	—
4	Andie Robinson	Cronulla	Centre	—	1	1	1	0	4	—	0	0	0	0	0	—	—	—	—	9m 4t	—	—	—
5	Leianne Fiaoo	Cronulla	Centre, Wing	—	1	1	0	0	0	2021	1	7	2	0	8	—	—	—	7m 2t	11m 11t	—	1m 1t	—
6	Emily Curtain	Wests Tigers	Five-eighth	—	1	1	0	0	0	2021	1	3	1	0	4	—	—	—	3m 1t	10m 6t 32g	—	—	—
7	Maddie Studdon	Cronulla	Halfback	2018	4	8	2	14	36	2018	4	13	1	15	35	2m	4m 8g	2m	5m 1t 7g	9m 3t 45g	7m 1t 7g	6m 1t 13g	3m 2g
8	Filomina Hanisi	Mounties	Prop	2020	2	2	0	0	0	2020	2	9	0	0	0	—	—	4m	5m	9m	2m 1t	—	—
9	Renee Target	North Sydney	Hooker	2021	2	2	0	0	0	2021	1	6	0	0	0	—	—	—	6m	10m	—	—	—
10	Tommaya Kelly-Sines	Mounties	Prop	2021	2	2	0	0	0	2021	1	4	0	0	0	—	—	—	4m	7m 2t	—	—	2m 1t
11	Shaylee Bent	Wynnum Manly	Second-row	2019	2	4	1	0	4	2019	3	13	2	0	8	—	4m 1t	2m	7m 1t	6m	1m	—	4m
12	Talei Holmes	Cronulla	Second-row	2020	2	2	0	0	0	2020	2	7	0	0	0	—	—	3m	4m	11m 13t	—	1m	—
13	Kennedy Cherrington	Cronulla	Lock	2020	2	2	0	0	0	2020	2	9	0	0	0	—	—	4m	5m	10m 3t	1m	—	2m
14	Shirley Mailangi	South Sydney	interchange, Hooker	2021	2	2	0	0	0	2021	1	5	0	0	0	—	—	—	5m	11m 4t 1g	—	—	—
15	Fatafehi Hanisi	Mounties	interchange, Prop	—	1	1	0	0	0	—	0	0	0	0	0	—	—	—	—	2m	—	—	—
16	Christian Pio	Wests Tigers	interchange, Prop	2021	2	2	0	0	0	2021	1	4	2	0	8	—	—	—	4m 2t	10m 2t	—	—	—
17	Brooke Anderson	Cronulla	interchange	—	1	1	0	0	0	—	0	0	0	0	0	—	—	—	—	—	—	—	—
18	Tayla Preston	Wests Tigers	Five-eighth	—	1	1	0	0	0	—	0	0	0	0	0	—	—	—	—	6m 2t 6g	—	—	—
—	Jocephy Daniels	Mounties	Centre	2021	1	1	2	0	8	2021	1	3	0	0	0	—	—	—	3m	10m 12t	—	—	1m
—	Aliti Namoce Sagano	North Sydney	Second-row, Prop	2019	2	3	0	0	0	2019	2	7	0	0	0	—	3m	—	4m	6m 3t	—	—	—

=== Open Women's Country Team ===
The Country squad for the 2022 Open Women's match against City. The team is coached by Ruan Sims.

J#	Player	2022 State Club	Position(s)	Country						NRLW										2021 State	Interstate	Tests	All Stars
J#	Player	2022 State Club	Position(s)	Dbt	S	M	T	G	Pts	Dbt	S	M	T	G	Pts	2018	2019	2020	2021	2021 State	Interstate	Tests	All Stars
1	Sam Bremner	Cronulla	Fullback	2018	2	4	1	0	4	2018	2	4	1	0	4	1m 1t	—	3m	—	—	—	—	—
2	Teagan Berry	Cronulla	Wing	—	1	1	0	0	0	2020	2	8	5	1	22	—	—	1m 1t 1g	7m 4t	3m 6t	—	—	—
3	Keele Browne	Wests Tigers	Centre	—	1	1	0	0	0	2021	1	3	1	0	4	—	—	—	3m 1t	3m 2t	—	—	—
4	Jayme Fressard	Central Coast	Centre	2020	4	6	1	0	4	2020	2	7	1	0	4	—	—	3m	4m 1t	9m 6t	—	—	—
5	Abbi Church	St Marys	Wing	—	1	1	0	0	0	2021	1	5	2	0	8	—	—	—	5m 2t	8m 3t	—	—	—
6	Bobbi Law	Newcastle Knights	Five-eighth	2019	2	4	3	0	12	2019	3	7	2	0	8	—	1m 1t	1m 1t	5m	—	—	—	2m
7	Jocelyn Kelleher	Central Coast	Halfback	2020	2	2	1	0	4	2020	2	10	1	0	4	—	—	3m	7m 1t	11m 7t 12g	—	—	—
8	Phoebe Desmond	Newcastle Knights	Prop	2021	2	2	0	0	0	2021	1	4	1	0	4	—	—	—	4m 1t	—	—	—	—
9	Olivia Higgins	Newcastle Knights	Hooker	—	1	1	0	0	0	2021	1	7	1	0	4	—	—	—	7m 1t	11m 1t	—	—	—
10	Caitlan Johnston	Newcastle Knights	Prop	2019	2	2	1	0	4	2019	2	4	0	0	0	—	3m	—	1m	10m 5t	—	—	4m
11	Kaitlyn Phillips	Brisbane Broncos	Second-row, Prop	2020	2	4	1	0	4	2020	2	7	1	0	4	—	—	2m	5m 1t	6m 1t	—	—	3m
12	Olivia Kernick	Central Coast	Second-row	—	1	1	0	0	0	2021	1	7	3	0	12	—	—	—	7m 3t	11m 2t	—	—	1m 1m
13	Kirra Dibb	North Sydney	interchange, Lock	2019	2	4	0	7	14	2019	3	11	1	12	28	—	3m 4g	3m 1t 4g	5m 4g	10m 4t 26g	1m 1g	1m	1m 3g
14	Shawden Burton	Central Coast	Hooker	—	1	1	0	0	0	2021	1	2	0	0	0	—	—	—	2m	11m 3t	—	—	—
15	Vanessa Foliaki	St Marys	Prop	2018	3	5	1	0	4	2018	3	11	0	0	0	4m	3m	4m	—	—	6m 1t	6m 4t	1m
16	Tayla Predebon	Newcastle Knights	interchange, Prop	2021	2	2	1	0	4	2021	1	7	0	0	0	—	—	—	7m	11m 7t	—	—	—
17	Melanie Howard	Newcastle Knights	interchange, Halfback	2018	3	6	0	8	16	2018	3	7	2	0	8	3m	2m 1t	2m 1t	—	4m	1m 1g	—	—
—	Rikeya Horne	St Marys	Wing, Centre, Fullback	2018	3	5	2	0	8	2018	4	11	1	0	4	3m 1t	3m	1m	4m	8m 6t	—	—	—

Notes:

- In the above tables J# = Jersey number, Dbt = Debut Year, S = Seasons, M = Matches, T = Tries, G = Goals
- Tallies in the tables include the 2022 match.
- In relation to the extended squad of the NSW Women's State of Origin team that was named in mid-April:
  - City Origin players Shaylee Bent, Jaime Chapman, Filomina Hanisi, Talei Holmes and Renee Target were named.
  - Country Origin players Teagan Berry, Olivia Kernick and Bobbi Law were named.
  - City Origin eligible players Corban Baxter, Quincy Dodd, Tiana Penitani, Jessica Sergis, Simaima Taufa, Sarah Togatuki, and Holli Wheeler are to be rested.
  - Country Origin eligible players Kezie Apps, Millie Boyle, Keeley Davis, Taliah Fuimaono, Isabelle Kelly, Yasmin Meakes, Rachael Pearson, Hannah Southwell, Emma Tonegato are to be rested.
- Taina Naividi was selected as a concussion substitute in the 2021 City-Country match.
- Leianne Fiaoo (Tufuga) played for Samoa in 2020.
- Talei Holmes played for Fiji in 2019.
- Olivia Kernick played for the Indigenous All Stars team in 2021 and for the Māori All Stars team in 2022.

=== City versus Country Men ===
Sunday, 15 May 2022
2.05pm (AET)

City	34 — 36	Country
Tries: 6 Steven Tavita; Clayton Faulolo; Edward Aiono; Eparama Navale; Raymond Lesoa, Eli Roberts; Goals: 6 Brad Keighran 4/5; Keiran Hayman 1/1	HT: 22–14; ReportL	Tries: 7 Dillon Rota 3 Donte Efaraimo; Oliver Regan; Mitchell Andrews; Jake Brisbane; Goals: 4 Blair Grant 4/7

Leichhardt Oval
Referee: Damian Brady
Player of the Match: Jake Brisbane

=== Men's Open Age City Team ===
The City squad for the 2022 Open Age Men's match against Country. The team is coached by Brett Cook.

J#	Position	Player	Ron Massey Cup Club
1	Five-eighth	Clayton Faulalo	Wentworthville Magpies
2	Wing	Eparama Navale	Mounties
3	Centre, Five-eighth	Eli Roberts	Hills District Bulls
4	Centre	Raymond Lesoa	St Marys Saints
5	Wing	Edward Aiono	St Marys Saints
6	Five-eighth, Halfback	Keiran Hayman	Hills District Bulls
7	Halfback	Jesse Marschke	Hills District Bulls
8	Prop	Antonio Pelesasa	St Marys Saints
9	Hooker	Brad Keighran	Hills District Bulls
10	Prop	Niko Apelu	Wentworthville Magpies
11	Second-row	Steven Tavita	Hills District Bulls
12	Second-row	Patrick Hollis	St Marys Saints
13	Lock	Denzal Tonise	Hills District Bulls
14	interchange, Hooker	Jarrod Brackenhofer	St Marys Saints
15	interchange, Second-row	Joe Vaegaau	St Marys Saints
16	interchange, Second-row	Cleveland McGhie	Ryde-Eastwood Hawks
17	interchange, Prop	D'rhys Miller	Western Suburbs Magpies
18	interchange, Lock	Lopeti Mafi	Blacktown Workers Sea Eagles

Note: Eli Levido, Manaia Rudolph, Caleb Uele (all Glebe) and Semisi Kioa (Mounties) were named in the selected squad but are not named in the programme.

=== Men's Open Age Country Team ===
The Country squad for the 2022 Open Age Men's match against City. The team is coached by Terry Campese.

J#	Position	Player	Club	Region
1	Fullback	Oliver Regan	Ballina Seagulls	Northern Rivers Titans
2	Wing	Dillon Rota	Goulburn City Bulldogs	Monaro Colts
3	Centre, Fullback	Mitchell Andrews	Forbes Magpies	Western Rams
4	Centre	Kayne Brennan	Gerringong Lions	Illawarra South Coast Dragons
5	Wing, Fullback	Donte Efaraimo	Albion Park-Oak Flats Eagles	Illawarra South Coast Dragons
6	Five-eighth	Jake Brisbane	Warilla-Lake South Gorillas	Illawarra South Coast Dragons
7	Halfback	Blair Grant	Warilla-Lake South Gorillas	Illawarra South Coast Dragons
8	Prop	Caleb Ziebell	Cudgen Hornets	Northern Rivers Titans
9	Hooker	James Luff	Gundagai Tigers	Riverina Bulls
10	Prop	Zac Saddler	Tuggeranong Bushrangers	Monaro Colts
11	Second-row	Matthew Delbanco	Stingrays of Shellharbour	Illawarra South Coast Dragons
12	Second-row	Ron Leapai	Goulburn City Bulldogs	Monaro Colts
13	Lock	Keiran Rankmore	Stingrays of Shellharbour	Illawarra South Coast Dragons
14	interchange, Five-eighth	Toby McIntosh	Murwillumbah Mustangs	Northern Rivers Titans
15	interchange, Lock	Darby Medlyn	Tuggeranong Bushrangers	Monaro Colts
16	interchange, Lock	Connor Ziebell	Cudgen Hornets	Northern Rivers Titans.
17	interchange, Prop	Zachary Masters	Tumut Blues	Riverina Bulls
18	interchange	Richard Roberts		North Coast Bulldogs
—	Prop	Bradley Prior	Woden Valley Rams	Monaro Colts

== Under 19 State of Origin Women ==
The NSW squad for the 2022 Under 19 Women's match against Queensland. The team is coached by Blake Cavallaro.

J#	Player	Club	Position(s)	NSW U19		NRLW 2021	State		U19 Tarsha Gale
J#	Player	Club	Position(s)	Dbt	M	NRLW 2021	2021	2022	2021	2022
1	Jada Taylor	Sydney Roosters	Fullback	—		—	—	4m 1t	—	6m 9t
2	Petesa Lio	Parramatta	Wing	—		—	—	3m 2t	7m 3t	8m 4t
3	Andie Robinson	Cronulla	Centre	2021	1	—	9m 4t	5m 2t	2m	—
4	Mia Middleton	Newcastle Knights	Centre	—		—	—	—	5m 3t	9m 9t
5	Cassey Tohi-Hiku	St George	Wing	2021	1	—	—	4m	10m 6t	7m 1t
6	Losana Lutu	Wests Tigers	Five-eighth	—		—	—	3m 1t	—	8m 5t 3g
7	Tayla Montgomery	Sydney Roosters	Halfback	2021	1	—	0m	0m	11m 1t	9m 2t
8	Monalisa Soliola	Canterbury	Prop	—		—	—	5m	—	6m 4t 5g
9	Rueben Cherrington	Cronulla	Hooker	2021	1	—	—	2m 1g	7m 7t 3g	1m
10	Ruby-Jean Kennard	Parramatta	Prop	—		—	—	3m	8m 3t	8m 3t
11	Leilani Wilson	Sydney Roosters	Second-row	2021	1	—	—	3m	8m 1t	9m 4t
12	Chantel Tugaga	St George	Second-row	2021	1	1m	—	5m	7m 2t	—
13	Iesha Duckett	Sydney Roosters	Lock	—		—	—	1m	8m 2t	9m
13	Tahleisha Maeva	Parramatta	Second-row	—		—	—	1m	—	7m 2t
14	Anneka Wilson	Sydney Roosters	Five-eighth	—		—	—	2m 1t	8m 2t	9m
15	Tiana Kore	Illawarra	Prop	—		—	—	—	9m 1t	8m 1t
17	Jules Kirkpatrick	Newcastle Knights	Second-row, Lock	—		—	—	—	7m 1t	9m 3t
18	Rosemarie Beckett	Parramatta	Halfback, Centre	—		—	—	3m	11m 5t 9g	7m 6t 1g
19	Chloe Jackson	North Sydney	Second-row, Lock	—		—	—	1m	—	6m 4t
20	Alanna Dummett	Canberra	Fullback, Five-eighth	—		—	—	—	4m 1t	8m 3t
21	Salma Nour	Illawarra	Hooker	—		—	—	4m 1t	9m 5t 1g	7m 10t
22	Milly Lupo	Sydney Roosters	Prop	—		—	—	4m	4m	9m 1t
