= 2022 Canterbury-Bankstown Bulldogs season =

NRL rugby league season

- NRL Rank: 12th
- 2022 record: Wins: 7; draws: 0; losses: 17
- Points scored: For: 383; against: 575

Team information
- CEO: Aaron Warburton
- Head Coach: Trent Barrett (Rounds 1-10); Mick Potter (Round 11 onwards)
- Captain: Josh Jackson
- Stadium: Accor Stadium; Commbank Stadium; Belmore Sports Ground
- Avg. attendance: 15,005
- High attendance: 30,220
- Low attendance: 8,837

Top scorers
- Tries: Josh Addo-Carr (14)
- Goals: Matt Burton (43)
- Points: Matt Burton (106)
← 2021	List of seasons	2023 →

The 2022 Canterbury-Bankstown Bulldogs season was the 88th in the club's history. They competed in the National Rugby League's 2022 Telstra Premiership. Trent Barrett was head coach of the team for the first 10 rounds, before resigning following their 16–6 loss to the Newcastle Knights.

== Fixtures ==
The club started 2022 with two pre-season trial matches against the Newcastle Knights (16–16 draw) and the Cronulla Sutherland Sharks (6–30 loss) in February before kicking off the regular season away to the North Queensland Cowboys in round one. On 13 June, they recorded their most impressive win in recent history beating the Parramatta Eels with Josh Addo-Carr scoring his first hat-trick of tries for the club.

=== Regular season ===
Round	Home	Score	Away	Match Information
Round	Home	Score	Away	Date and Time	Venue	Crowd
1	North Queensland Cowboys	4 – 6	Canterbury-Bankstown Bulldogs	Sun 13 Mar, 6:15pm AEDT	Queensland Country Bank Stadium	12,640
2	Canterbury-Bankstown Bulldogs	10 – 16	Brisbane Broncos	Sun 20 Mar 6:15pm AEDT	Accor Stadium	13,453
3	Manly Warringah Sea Eagles	13 – 12	Canterbury-Bankstown Bulldogs	Sun 27 Mar 6:15pm AEDT	4 Pine Park	13.261
4	Melbourne Storm	44 – 0	Canterbury-Bankstown Bulldogs	Sun 03 Apr 4:05pm AEDT	AAMI Park	13,437
5	Canterbury-Bankstown Bulldogs	12 – 32	Penrith Panthers	Sun 10 Apr 6:15pm AEST	CommBank Stadium	11,157
6	South Sydney Rabbitohs	36 – 16	Canterbury-Bankstown Bulldogs	Fri 15 Apr 4:00pm AEST	Accor Stadium	30,194
7	Brisbane Broncos	34 – 14	Canterbury-Bankstown Bulldogs	Fri 22 Apr 7:55pm AEST	Suncorp Stadium	23,243
8	Canterbury-Bankstown Bulldogs	16 – 12	Sydney Roosters	Sat 30 Apr 5:30pm AEST	Accor Stadium	9,544
9	Canberra Raiders	14 – 4	Canterbury-Bankstown Bulldogs	Fri 6 May 6:00pm AEST	GIO Stadium	12,890
10	Canterbury-Bankstown Bulldogs	6 – 16	Newcastle Knights	Fri 13 May 6:00pm AEST	Suncorp Stadium	30,220*
11	Wests Tigers	36 – 22	Canterbury-Bankstown Bulldogs	Fri 20 May 6:00pm AEST	Leichhardt Oval	15,124
12	Canterbury-Bankstown Bulldogs	24 – 34	St. George Illawarra Dragons	Sun 29 May 2:00pm AEST	Belmore Sports Ground	16,991
13	Penrith Panthers	30 – 18	Canterbury-Bankstown Bulldogs	Fri 03 Jun 7:55pm AEST	BlueBet Stadium	16,906
14	Canterbury-Bankstown Bulldogs	34 – 4	Parramatta Eels	Mon 13 Jun 4:00pm AEST	Accor Stadium	20,184
15	Canterbury-Bankstown Bulldogs	36 – 12	Wests Tigers	Sun 19 Jun 4:05pm AEST	Commbank Stadium	14,806
16	Canterbury-Bankstown Bulldogs	6 – 18	Cronulla Sutherland Sharks	Sat 02 Jul 3:00pm AEST	Commbank Stadium	8,837
17		BYE
18	Canterbury-Bankstown Bulldogs	28 – 36	South Sydney Rabbitohs	Sun 17 Jul 6:15pm AEST	Accor Stadium	19,126
19	Canterbury-Bankstown Bulldogs	36 – 26	Gold Coast Titans	Sun 24 Jul 2:00pm AEST	CommBank Stadium	11,726
20	Newcastle Knights	10 – 24	Canterbury-Bankstown Bulldogs	Sun 31 Jul 2:00pm AEST	McDonald Jones Stadium	19,813
21	Canterbury-Bankstown Bulldogs	14 – 28	North Queensland Cowboys	Sun 07 Aug 2:00pm AEST	Salter Oval	8,521
22	New Zealand Warriors	42 – 18	Canterbury-Bankstown Bulldogs	Fri 12 Aug 8:00pm NZST	Mount Smart Stadium	16,212
23	Parramatta Eels	42 – 6	Canterbury-Bankstown Bulldogs	Sat 20 Aug 3:00pm AEST	CommBank Stadium	26,451
24	Cronulla Sutherland Sharks	16 – 0	Canterbury-Bankstown Bulldogs	Sat 27 Aug 5:30pm AEST	PointsBet Stadium	11,500
25	Canterbury-Bankstown Bulldogs	21 – 20	Manly Warringah Sea Eagles	Fri 02 Sep 6:00pm AEST	Accor Stadium	13,648
Legend: Win Loss Draw Bye | * Magic Round

== Ladder ==
2022 NRL season
Pos	Team	Pld	W	D	L	B	PF	PA	PD	Pts
1	Penrith Panthers (P)	24	20	0	4	1	636	330	+306	42
2	Cronulla-Sutherland Sharks	24	18	0	6	1	573	364	+209	38
3	North Queensland Cowboys	24	17	0	7	1	633	361	+272	36
4	Parramatta Eels	24	16	0	8	1	608	489	+119	34
5	Melbourne Storm	24	15	0	9	1	657	410	+247	32
6	Sydney Roosters	24	15	0	9	1	635	434	+201	32
7	South Sydney Rabbitohs	24	14	0	10	1	604	474	+130	30
8	Canberra Raiders	24	14	0	10	1	524	461	+63	30
9	Brisbane Broncos	24	13	0	11	1	514	550	−36	28
10	St. George Illawarra Dragons	24	12	0	12	1	469	569	−100	26
11	Manly Warringah Sea Eagles	24	9	0	15	1	490	595	−105	20
12	Canterbury-Bankstown Bulldogs	24	7	0	17	1	383	575	−192	16
13	Gold Coast Titans	24	6	0	18	1	455	660	−205	14
14	Newcastle Knights	24	6	0	18	1	372	662	−290	14
15	New Zealand Warriors	24	6	0	18	1	408	700	−292	14
16	Wests Tigers	24	4	0	20	1	352	679	−327	10

== 2022 squad ==
Canterbury Bulldogs 2022 Squad
Top 30 Squad - 2022 Season			Development Players	Coaching Staff
(Australia) Josh Addo-Carr (vc) – WG; (Samoa) Paul Alamoti – CE; (Australia) Corey Allan – CE, FB; (Australia) Jake Averillo – FB, CE, FE, HB; (Papua New Guinea) Bailey Biondi-Odo – HB, HK, FE; (Australia) Braidon Burns – CE, WG; (Australia) Matt Burton – FE; (Republic of Ireland) Joshua Cook – HK; (Australia) Matt Doorey – SR; (Samoa) Raymond Faitala-Mariner – SR	(Australia) Kyle Flanagan – HB; (Australia) Jack Hetherington – SR; (Australia) Reece Hoffman – SR; (Australia) Josh Jackson (c) – LK, SR; (Tonga) Tuipulotu Katoa – WG; (Australia) Max King – PR, LK; (New Zealand) Jeremy Marshall-King – HK; (Nigeria) Jayden Okunbor – WG; (Tonga) Tevita Pangai – SR, LK, PR; (Australia) Chris Patolo – PR, SR	(Scotland) Aaron Schoupp – CE; (New Zealand) Ava Seumanufagai – PR; (Australia) Joe Stimson – SR, LK; (England) Luke Thompson (vc) – PR; (New Zealand) Jackson Topine – SR; (Italy) Paul Vaughan – PR; (Australia) Corey Waddell – SR; (Fiji) Brandon Wakeham – FE, HB, HK	(Australia) Zac Hetherington – SR, HK; (Lebanon) Jacob Kiraz – WG, CE; (Samoa) Cooper Talau – PR; Extended squad: (Australia) Declan Casey – CE, WG, FB; (New Zealand) Zach Dockar-Clay – HK, FE, LK; (Australia) Harrison Edwards – SR, PR; (Fiji) Isaac Lumelume – WG, CE; (Cook Islands) Phillip Makatoa – PR, LK; (Australia) Kurtis Morrin – LK, PR; (Samoa) Jeral Skelton – CE; (Australia) Joshua Stuckey – LK, SR, PR; (Australia) Jayden Tanner – PR; (Greece) Billy Tsikrikas – PR	Manager: Phil Gould (General Manager of Football); Head coach: Mick Potter (Caretaker); Assistant coaches: David Furner; Craig Sandercock; Steve Turner; David Tangata-Toa (Transition Coach); Medical Professionals: Luke Portese (Strength & Conditioning); Luke Inman (Chief Medical Officer); Managers: Fred Ciraldo (Team Manager); Legend: (c) Captain(s); (vc) Vice-captain(s); Updated: 14 August 2022; Source(s): Bulldogs Team Profiles

== Awards ==
=== Canterbury-Bankstown Bulldogs Awards Night ===
Held at Doltone House, Darling Island, Wednesday 7 September.

- Dr George Peponis Player of the Year: Jeremy Marshall-King
- Coaches Award: Max King
- Steve Mortimer Rookie of the Year: Jacob Kiraz
- Member's Player of the Year: Matt Burton
- Peter Warren Award (Community Service): Raymond Faitala-Mariner
- Terry Lamb Player of the Year (New South Wales Cup): Jackson Topine
- Hazem El Masri Player of the Year (Jersey Flegg): Bailey Hayward
- Les Johns Club Person of the Year: Steven Litvensky
