= Harold Matthews Cup =

Junior rugby league competition in New South Wales

- Sport: Rugby league
- Instituted: 1970
- Inaugural season: 1970
- Number of teams: 17
- Country: Australia (16 teams); New Zealand 1 team
- Premiers: Newcastle Knights (6th title) (2026)
- Most titles: Parramatta Eels (20 titles)
- Website: Harold Matthews Cup
- Broadcast partner: NSWRL channel on facebook
- Related competition: Andrew Johns Cup; S. G. Ball Cup

The NSWRL Harold Matthews Cup is a junior rugby league competition played in New South Wales between teams made up of players aged under 16. The competition is administered by the New South Wales Rugby League (NSWRL). The competition is made up of NSW-based clubs and includes both junior representative teams of the elite National Rugby League (NRL) and clubs that do not field teams in the NRL competition.

The competition is named after Harold Matthews, a Balmain Tigers secretary who later was appointed as manager of the Australian Test squad and later went on to become secretary of the NSWRL and ARL.
The competition was run as a knock-out tournament until 1991. From the 1992 onwards, the format has been a number of home-and-away rounds in which all teams compete, followed by a finals series.

== The clubs ==
In 2019, 2020, 2021 and 2022, 15 clubs fielded teams in the NSWRL UNE Harold Matthews Cup.
The New Zealand Warriors joined the competition in 2024, having previously fielded teams in the older age S.G. Ball Cup. The Melbourne Storm re-joined the Harold Matthews Cup in 2024, having previously fielded a team in the 2013 and 2014 seasons.

- Balmain Tigers
- Canberra Raiders
- Canterbury-Bankstown Bulldogs
- Central Coast Roosters
- Cronulla-Sutherland Sharks
- Illawarra Steelers
- Manly-Warringah Sea Eagles
- Melbourne Storm
- Newcastle Knights
- New Zealand Warriors (Auckland Warriors)
- North Sydney Bears
- Parramatta Eels
- Penrith Panthers
- South Sydney Rabbitohs
- St George Dragons
- Sydney Roosters (Eastern Suburbs Roosters)
- Western Suburbs Magpies

Central Coast and Sydney both compete as the Roosters. Typically, Sydney compete in navy blue jerseys with red and white chevrons, whilst the Central Coast compete in white jerseys with red and navy blue chevrons.

In the 1970s and early 1980s the Harold Matthews Cup was played in a carnival format over three to five successive days. Teams from the country groups and regions competed alongside representative teams from the NSWRL clubs of Sydney. The competition later changed to a partial round-robin format.

Former teams in the Harold Matthews Cup include: Gold Coast Titans (2009), South-Western Sydney Academy of Sport (2008–16) and Western Sydney Academy of Sport (2007–17).

After the sixth round on 14 & 15 March, the 2020 competition was suspended and subsequently cancelled due to the COVID-19 pandemic in Australia.

== Harold Matthews Cup Premiers ==
=== Knock-Out Tournament ===
Year	Age	Premiers	Runners up	Report
1970		Parramatta Eels		
1971		Parramatta Eels		
1972		Parramatta Eels		
1973		Cronulla-Sutherland Sharks		
1974		South Sydney Rabbitohs	Parramatta Eels	
1975		Parramatta Eels	Illawarra (CRL)	
1976	U14	Parramatta Eels		
1977	U14	Cronulla-Sutherland Sharks		
1978	U14	Canberra Rugby League (CRL)	Parramatta Eels	
1979	U14	Penrith Panthers		
1980	U14	Group 12 (CRL)	Cronulla-Sutherland Sharks	
1981	U14	Parramatta Eels		
1982	U14	Parramatta Eels		
1983	U14	Group 6 Rugby League (CRL)	Penrith Panthers	
1984	U14	Canberra Raiders	Central Coast	
1985	U14	Penrith Panthers		
1986	U15	Parramatta Eels	Cronulla-Sutherland Sharks	
1987	U15	Illawarra Steelers	Penrith Panthers	
1988	U15	Parramatta Eels	Penrith Panthers	
1989	U15	Penrith Panthers	Parramatta Eels	
1990	U15	Parramatta Eels	Gold Coast Seagulls	
1991	U15	Gold Coast Seagulls	Cronulla-Sutherland Sharks	

=== Regular season and finals ===
From 1992 to 2002 and again since 2004, the Harold Matthews Cup has been run as a regular season — a series of home-and-away matches — followed by a final series. The number of rounds in the regular season is limited, with the limit being less than the number of teams. This means that each team plays some but not all of their opponents in the competition.

Year	Age	Premiers	Score	Runners up	Minor Premiers	Wooden Spoon	Report
1992	U15	Newcastle Knights	16–12	South Sydney Rabbitohs	South Sydney Rabbitohs	Eastern Suburbs Roosters	
1993	U15	Canberra Raiders	14–6	Parramatta Eels	Balmain Tigers	Eastern Suburbs Roosters	
1994	U15	Parramatta Eels	19–18	Penrith Panthers			
1995	U15	Canberra Raiders	20–19	Parramatta Eels			
1996	U15	Illawarra Steelers	36–20	Newcastle Knights	Newcastle Knights	Sydney Roosters	
1997	U16	Parramatta Eels	28–10	North Sydney Bears	Parramatta Eels		
1998	U16	Parramatta Eels	24–10	Illawarra Steelers	Parramatta Eels	St. George Dragons	
1999	U16	Parramatta Eels	44–18	South Sydney Rabbitohs	Parramatta Eels	Balmain Tigers	
2000	U16	Newcastle Knights	32–26	Penrith Panthers	Newcastle Knights	Sydney Roosters	
2001	U16	Cronulla Sharks	32–26	Penrith Panthers	Parramatta Eels	Sydney Roosters	
2002	U16	Penrith Panthers	38–0	Newcastle Knights	Penrith Panthers	Manly Sea Eagles	
2003	U15	Parramatta Eels	28–4	St George Dragons			
2004	U16	Parramatta Eels	18–16	Penrith Panthers	Parramatta Eels	Wests Magpies	
2005	U16	Penrith Panthers	38–10	Illawarra Steelers	Illawarra Steelers	Newcastle Knights	
2006	U16	Penrith Panthers	20–8	Canterbury Bulldogs	Canterbury Bulldogs	North Sydney Bears	
2007	U16	Canterbury Bulldogs	18–14	Penrith Panthers	Canterbury Bulldogs	North Sydney Bears	
2008	U16	Parramatta Eels	30–17	Penrith Panthers	Penrith Panthers	South-West Academy	
2009	U16	Canterbury Bulldogs	34–22	Parramatta Eels	Canterbury Bulldogs	South-West Academy	
2010	U16	Penrith Panthers	22–12	Parramatta Eels	Parramatta Eels	South-West Academy	
2011	U16	Canterbury Bulldogs	13–12	Illawarra Steelers	Illawarra Steelers	North Sydney Bears	
2012	U16	Parramatta Eels	39–32	Newcastle Knights	South Sydney Rabbitohs	Sydney Roosters	
2013	U16	Parramatta Eels	24–16	South Sydney Rabbitohs	South Sydney Rabbitohs	South-West Academy	
2014	U16	Newcastle Knights	34–4	Penrith Panthers	Newcastle Knights	North Sydney Bears	
2015	U16	Cronulla Sharks	30–16	Parramatta Eels	Parramatta Eels	Sydney Roosters	
2016	U16	Parramatta Eels	16–14	Newcastle Knights	Parramatta Eels	South-West Academy	
2017	U16	Newcastle Knights	26–20	Manly Sea Eagles	Newcastle Knights	Wests Magpies	
2018	U16	Manly Sea Eagles	26–18	Parramatta Eels	Penrith Panthers	North Sydney Bears	
2019	U16	Newcastle Knights	28–8	Canterbury Bulldogs	Newcastle Knights	St George Dragons	
2020	U16	Season was suspended due to the COVID-19 pandemic.					
2021	U17	Manly Sea Eagles	24–12	Parramatta Eels	Manly Sea Eagles	Canberra Raiders	
2022	U17	Wests Magpies	42–16	Cronulla Sharks	Wests Magpies	Central Coast Roosters	
2023	U17	Canterbury Bulldogs	32–6	Newcastle Knights	Penrith Panthers	Manly Sea Eagles	
2024	U17	New Zealand Warriors	34–16	Wests Magpies	Canterbury Bulldogs	Balmain Tigers	
2025	U17	New Zealand Warriors	30–16	Newcastle Knights	Illawarra Steelers	Melbourne Storm	
2026	U17	Newcastle Knights	22–0	Sydney Roosters	Newcastle Knights	Central Coast Roosters	

== Premiership Tally ==
No.	Club	Seasons
1	**Parramatta Eels**	**20** (1970, 1971, 1972, 1975, 1976, 1981, 1982, 1986, 1988, 1990, 1994, 1997, 1998, 1999, 2003, 2004, 2008, 2012, 2013, 2016)
2	**Penrith Panthers**	**7** (1979, 1985, 1989, 2002, 2005, 2006, 2010)
3	**Newcastle Knights**	**6** (1992, 2000, 2014, 2017, 2019, 2026)
4	**Canterbury-Bankstown Bulldogs**	**4** (2007, 2009, 2011, 2023)
4	**Cronulla-Sutherland Sharks**	**4** (1973, 1977, 2001, 2015)
6	**Canberra Raiders**	**3** (1984, 1993, 1995)
7	**Illawarra Steelers**	**2** (1987, 1996)
7	**Manly-Warringah Sea Eagles**	**2** (2018, 2021)
7	**New Zealand Warriors**	**2** (2024, 2025)
10	**South Sydney Rabbitohs**	**1** (1974)
10	Canberra Rugby League (CRL)	**1** (1978)
10	Group 12 (Central Coast, CRL)	**1** (1980)
10	Group 6 (CRL)	**1** (1983)
10	Gold Coast Seagulls	**1** (1991)
10	**Western Suburbs Magpies**	**1** (2022)

Bold means that the team is still currently playing in the competition.

== See also ==
- Andrew Johns Cup
- S. G. Ball Cup
- Rugby League Competitions in Australia
