= Andrew Tangata-Toa =

Tongan rugby league footballer

Personal information
- Born: 15 February 1974 (age 51) Gold Coast, Queensland, Australia

Playing information
- Position: Second-row, Lock, Wing
Club
Years	Team	Pld	T	G	FG	P
1993–96	Newcastle Knights	10	0	0	0	0
1997–98	St George Dragons	26	1	0	0	4
1999	Huddersfield Giants	16	2	0	0	8
	Total	52	3	0	0	12
Representative
Years	Team	Pld	T	G	FG	P
1997	Rest of the World	1	0	0	0	0
1998	Tonga	1	2	0	0	8
- Relatives: David Tangata-Toa (brother)

Andrew Tangata-Toa (born 15 February 1974) is a Tongan former professional rugby league footballer who played in the 1990s. Primarily a second-rower, he played for the Newcastle Knights, St George Dragons and Huddersfield Giants.

== Background ==
Born on the Gold Coast, Queensland, Tangata-Toa played junior rugby league for the Burleigh Bears and attended Miami State High School.

== Playing career ==
In 1990, Tangata-Toa represented the Queensland under-17 side, kicking three goals in a 14-all draw with New South Wales.

In Round 19 of the 1993 NSWRL season, Tangata-Toa made his first grade debut for the Newcastle Knights in a 14–16 loss to the Manly Sea Eagles. That season, he represented the New South Wales under-19 side. In 1995, Tangata-Toa was a member of the Tonga squad at the 1995 Rugby League World Cup but did not play a game.

In 1997, after four seasons with the Knights, Tangata-Toa joined the St George Dragons. During the 1997 season, he represented the Rest of the World side in an 8–28 loss to Australia. In his two seasons with the Dragons, Tangata-Toa played 26 games, scoring one try.

In 1999, he moved to the Huddersfield Giants in the Super League, playing 15 games in his lone season at the club.

== Personal life ==
Tangata-Toa's younger brother, David, is a former professional rugby league player and coach.
