= Kayal Iro =

Cook Islands international rugby league footballer

KL Iro
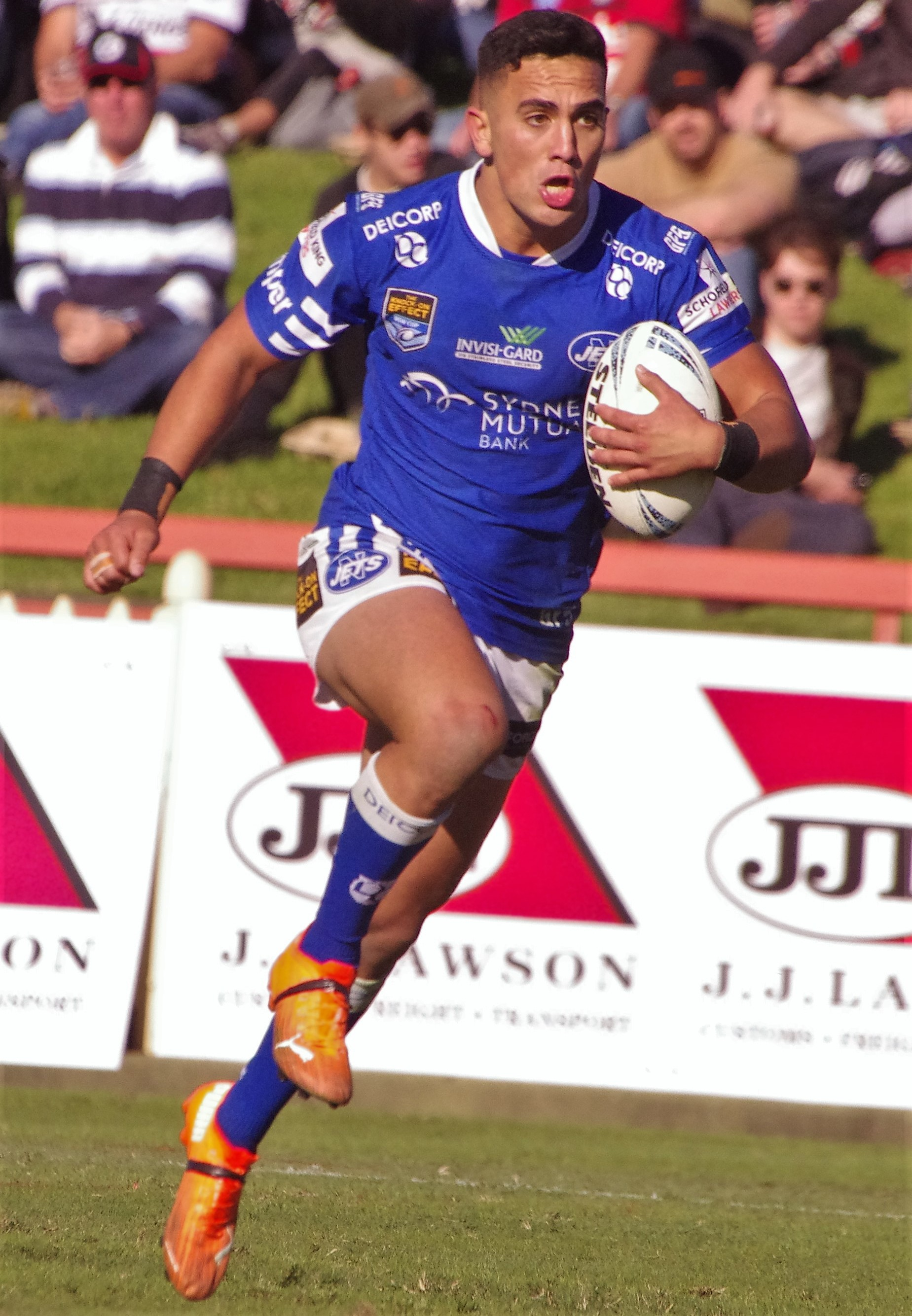

Personal information
- Full name: Kayal Roy Iro
- Born: 20 February 2000 (age 26) Leeds, West Yorkshire, England (Note: The Guardian reported Iro's birthplace as the Cook Islands, quoting his father Kevin. NRL.com stated that Iro was born in England while Kevin was playing for St Helens in the Super League. Rugby League Project lists his birthplace as Leeds, England.)
- Height: 185 cm (6 ft 1 in)
- Weight: 94 kg (14 st 11 lb)

Playing information
- Position: Centre
Club
Years	Team	Pld	T	G	FG	P
2022–	Cronulla Sharks	61	30	0	0	120
Representative
Years	Team	Pld	T	G	FG	P
2019–	Cook Islands	14	3	1	0	14
2019	Cook Islands 9s	2	2	0	0	8
- Source: As of 8 November 2026
- Education: Mount Albert Grammar School
- Father: Kevin Iro
- Relatives: Tony Iro (uncle)

Kayal Roy Iro (born 20 February 2000), also known as KL Iro, (Note: In April 2025, Iro announced his preference to be known as KL Iro, while also clarifying that his legal name wouldn't be changed. He explained that the name Kayal is a phonetic rendering of "KL", which are the initials of his father's given names.) is a Cook Islands international rugby league footballer who plays as a centre and winger for the Cronulla-Sutherland Sharks in the National Rugby League.

== Background ==
Iro is the son of former player Kevin Iro and nephew of coach Tony Iro. He grew up in Rarotonga where he played for the Arorangi Bears, then moved to Auckland at age 14 and attended Mount Albert Grammar School.

== Playing career ==
=== New Zealand Warriors ===
In 2019, Iro played for the New Zealand Warriors under 20s, before moving to the Newcastle Knights.

=== Newcastle Knights ===
On 12 November 2019, Iro signed a one-year under 20s contract with the Newcastle Knights.

=== Cronulla-Sutherland Sharks ===
In round 24 of the 2022 NRL season, Iro made his first grade debut for Cronulla in their 16-0 victory over Canterbury.

Iro won the New South Wales Cup player of the year for the 2022 NSW Cup season while playing for the Newtown Jets, the reserve grade affiliate of the Sharks.

On 25 July 2024, it was announced that Iro had re-signed with the Cronulla club on a two-year extension until the end of the 2026 season. Iro played 23 games for Cronulla in the 2024 NRL season as the club finished 4th on the table and qualified for the finals. Iro played in all three of Cronulla's finals matches including their preliminary final loss against Penrith.

=== 2025 ===
In round 2 of the 2025 NRL season, Iro scored two tries for Cronulla in their 36-12 victory over North Queensland. On 9 September, Cronulla announced that Iro had extended his contract until the end of 2029. Iro played 14 matches for Cronulla in the 2025 NRL season as the club finished 5th on the table.

=== 2026 ===
In round 9 of the 2026 NRL season, Iro scored a hat-trick in Cronulla's 52-10 victory over the Wests Tigers. Iro played 23 matches for Cronulla in the 2026 NRL season as the club finished 5th on the table and qualified for the finals.

== International ==
Iro represented the Cook Islands in the 2019 Rugby League World Cup 9s, scoring two tries in a 30–7 victory against Tonga.

He made his full international début in the 66–6 win over South Africa on 21 June 2019 at fullback.

== Statistics ==
=== NRL ===
*denotes season competing

Season	Team	Matches	T	G	GK %	F/G	Pts
2022	Cronulla-Sutherland	1	0	0	—	0	0
2024	Cronulla-Sutherland	23	6	0	—	0	24
2025	Cronulla-Sutherland	14	12	0	—	0	48
2026	Cronulla-Sutherland	23	12	0	—	0	48
2027	Cronulla-Sutherland						
Career totals		61	30	0	—	0	120

=== International ===
Season	Team	Matches	T	G	GK %	F/G	Pts
2019	Cook Islands	2	0	0	—	0	0
2022	Cook Islands	4	1	0	—	0	4
2023	Cook Islands	2	0	0	—	0	0
2025	Cook Islands	2	1	0	—	0	4
2026	Cook Islands	3	1				4
Career totals		14	3	0	—	0	12
