= Falakiko Manu =

New Zealand rugby league footballer

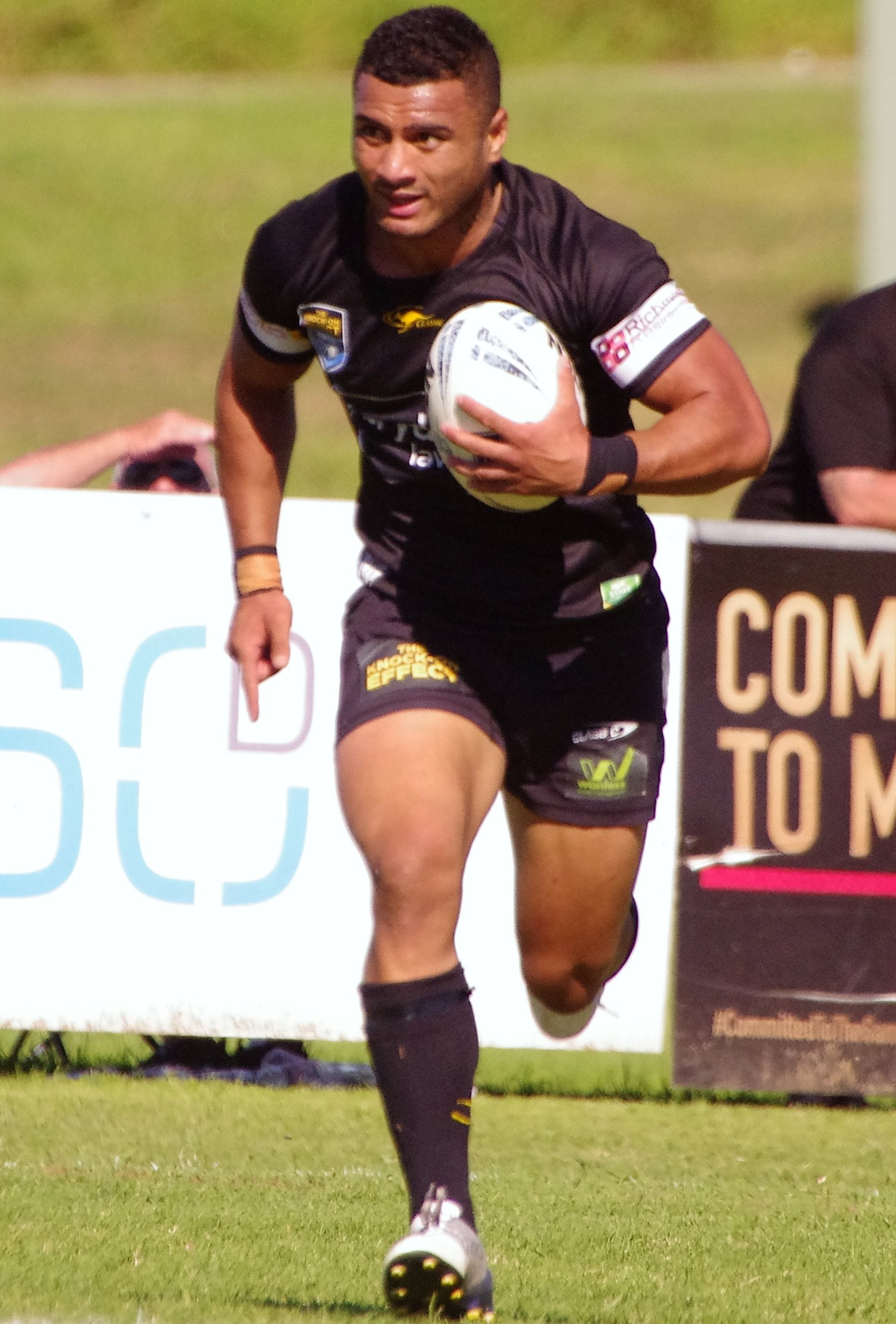

Personal information
- Full name: Falakiko Manu
- Born: 11 May 1997 (age 29) Auckland, New Zealand
- Height: 180 cm (5 ft 11 in)
- Weight: 90 kg (14 st 2 lb)

Playing information
- Position: Centre, Wing
Club
Years	Team	Pld	T	G	FG	P
2021	Canterbury Bulldogs	4	0	0	0	0
- Source: As of 24 October 2024

Falakiko Manu (born 11 May 1997) is a professional rugby league footballer who plays as a centre or winger for the Wynnum Manly Seagulls in the Hostplus Cup.

He previously played for the Canterbury-Bankstown Bulldogs in the NRL.

== Playing career ==
In round 16 of the 2021 NRL season, Manu made his debut for Canterbury-Bankstown against the Manly-Warringah Sea Eagles where Canterbury suffered a 66–0 defeat.

On 31 August 2021, Manu was one of twelve players who were told by Canterbury that they would not be offered a contract for the 2022 season and would be released at season's end. On 1 March 2022, it was announced that Manu had signed for Wynnum-Manly in the Queensland Cup.
