= Chris Patolo =

Australian rugby league footballer (born 2001)

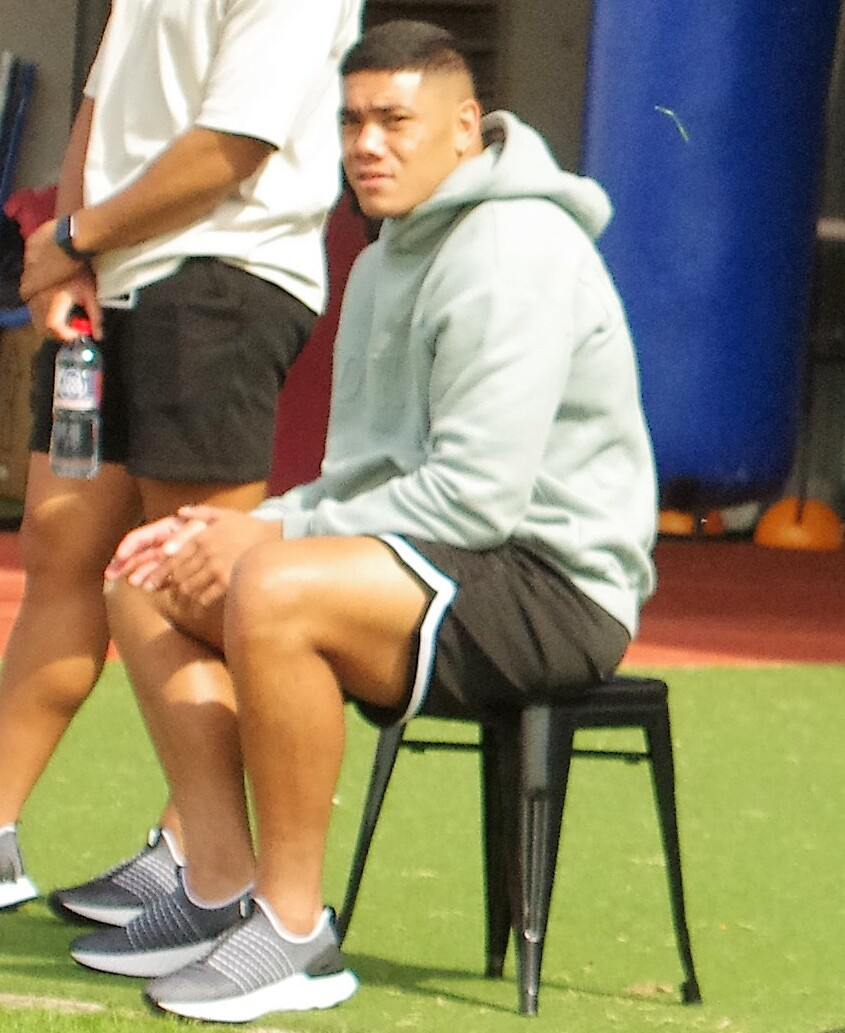

Personal information
- Born: 23 July 2001 (age 25) Sydney, New South Wales, Australia
- Height: 6 ft 1 in (1.86 m)
- Weight: 17 st 0 lb (108 kg)

Playing information
- Position: Prop
Club
Years	Team	Pld	T	G	FG	P
2021–24	Canterbury Bulldogs	27	0	0	0	0
2025	Manly Sea Eagles	0	0	0	0	0
2026–	Huddersfield Giants	21	3	0	0	12
	Total	48	3	0	0	12
- Source: As of 7 February 2026

Chris Patolo (born 23 July 2001) is a professional rugby league footballer nicknamed The Postman who plays as a prop for the Huddersfield Giants in the Super League.

== Background ==
He previously played for the Canterbury-Bankstown Bulldogs & Manly Sea Eagles

A local junior from the Bankstown Sports club, he was a member of Canterbury's Harold Matthews and SG Ball sides before progressing through the club’s High-Performance Youth Program and Jersey Flegg side.

== Playing career ==
=== 2021 ===
In round 16 of the 2021 NRL season, Patolo made his debut for Canterbury-Bankstown against the Manly-Warringah Sea Eagles. Patolo made a total of six appearances for Canterbury in the 2021 NRL season as the club finished last and claimed the Wooden Spoon.

=== 2022 ===
Patolo played a total of 15 matches for Canterbury in the 2022 NRL season as the club finished 12th on the table.

=== 2023 ===
Patolo only played two matches for Canterbury in the 2023 NRL season as the club finished 15th on the table.

=== 2024 ===
Patolo managed just 4 matches for Canterbury in the 2024 NRL season, primarily playing in reserve grade as the club finished 6th on the table.

On 19 October, Patolo would sign a train-and-trial contract with the Manly Sea Eagles.

=== 2025 ===
On 9 October 2025 it was reported that he signed for Huddersfield Giants in the Super League for 2026 on a 2-year contract.

== Statistics ==
Year	Team	Games	Tries	Pts
2021	Canterbury-Bankstown Bulldogs	6		
2022	Canterbury-Bankstown Bulldogs	15		
2023	Canterbury-Bankstown Bulldogs	2		
2024	Canterbury-Bankstown Bulldogs	4		
2025	Manly Warringah Sea Eagles	0	0	0
2026	Huddersfield Giants	0	0	0
	Totals	27		
