= Soni Luke =

Tonga international rugby league footballer

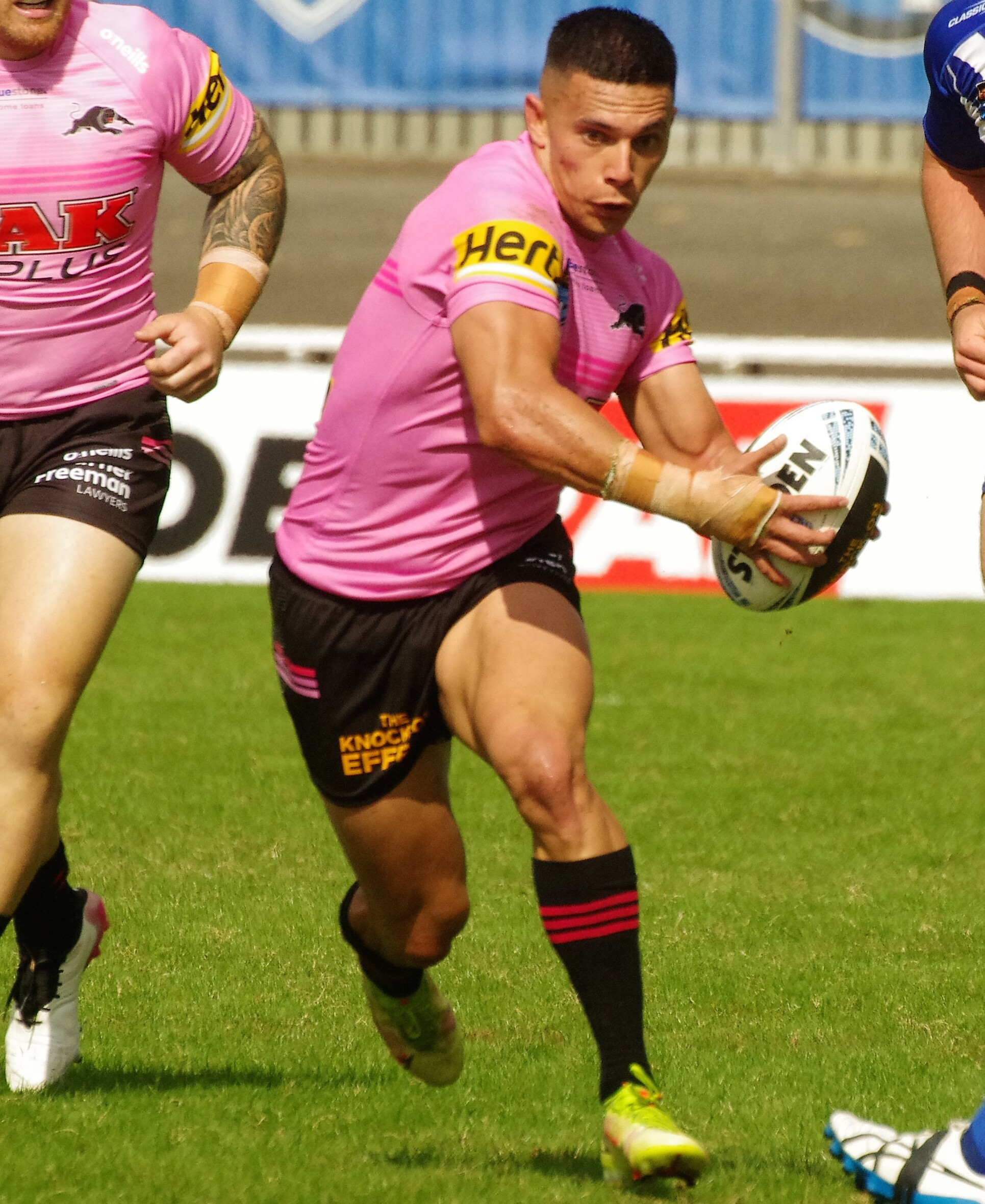

Personal information
- Full name: Soni Luke
- Born: 25 February 1996 (age 30) Penrith, New South Wales, Australia
- Height: 178 cm (5 ft 10 in)
- Weight: 85 kg (13 st 5 lb)

Playing information
- Position: Hooker
Club
Years	Team	Pld	T	G	FG	P
2022–25	Penrith Panthers	26	1	0	0	4
2026–	North Qld Cowboys	19	2	0	0	8
	Total	45	3	0	0	12
Representative
Years	Team	Pld	T	G	FG	P
2022–	Tonga	11	1	0	0	4
- Source: As of 6 November 2026

Soni Luke (born 25 February 1996) is a Tonga international rugby league footballer who plays as a hooker for the North Queensland Cowboys in the NRL.

He previously played for the Penrith Panthers in the National Rugby League.

== Background ==
Luke played his junior rugby league for the St Mary's Saints. He is of Tongan descent.

== Playing career ==
=== Penrith Panthers ===
In round 7 of the 2022 NRL season, Luke made his first grade debut for the Penrith Panthers against the Canberra Raiders at Penrith Stadium. Luke spent the majority of the season playing for Penrith's NSW Cup team. On 25 September 2022, Luke played for Penrith in their NSW Cup Grand Final victory over Canterbury scoring a try in the second half. On 2 October, Luke played in Penrith's 44-10 victory over Norths Devils in the NRL State Championship final. Luke was sent to the sin bin during the second half of the match for a professional foul. Luke played 20 games for Penrith in the 2023 NRL season however he did not feature in the clubs finals campaign or the 2023 NRL Grand Final in which Penrith defeated Brisbane. Luke only made two appearances for Penrith in the 2024 NRL season. On 9 September 2025, it was announced that Luke would be departing Penrith at the end of the 2025 NRL season after not being offered a new contract by the club.

On 17 November 2025, it was reported that Soni Luke had signed a deal with the South Sydney Rabbitohs for the 2026 season.

=== North Queensland Cowboys ===
On 20 January 2026, Luke backflipped on his South Sydney deal to join the North-Queensland Cowboys for the 2026 season. On 19 June 2026, the North Queensland outfit announced that Luke had re-signed with the club for a further year. Luke played 19 matches for North Queensland in the 2026 NRL season as the club finished 8th and qualified for the finals. He played in the clubs elimination final loss to Cronulla.

== Statistics ==
Year	Team	Games	Tries	Pts
2022	Penrith Panthers	4		
2023	Penrith Panthers	20	1	4
2024	Penrith Panthers	1		
2025	Penrith Panthers	1		
2026	North Queensland Cowboys	19	2	8
2027	North Queensland Cowboys			
	Totals	45	3	12
