= J'maine Hopgood =

Australian rugby league footballer

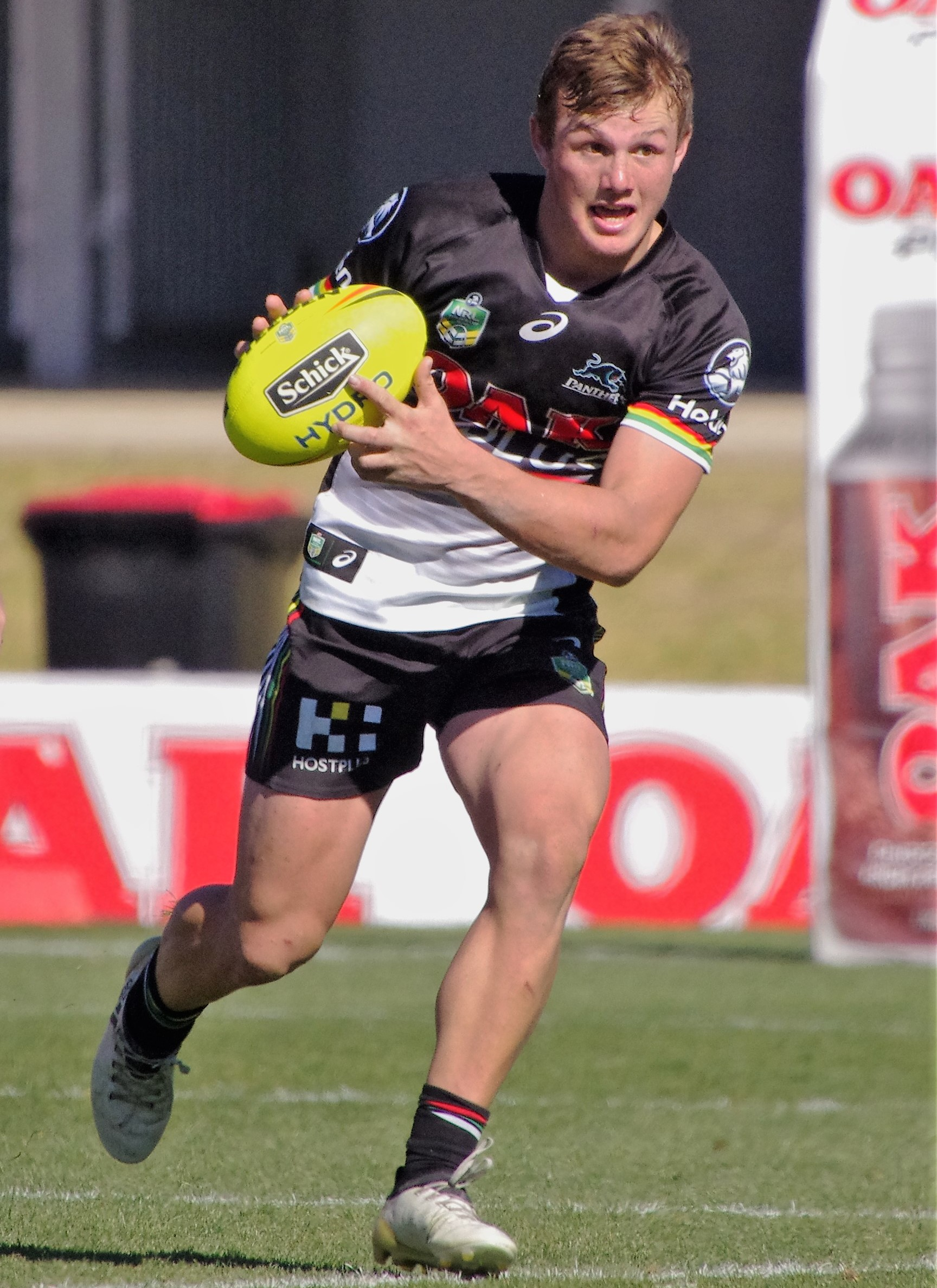

Personal information
- Full name: J'maine Dale Hopgood
- Born: 11 May 1999 (age 27) Hervey Bay, Queensland, Australia
- Height: 185 cm (6 ft 1 in)
- Weight: 102 kg (16 st 1 lb)

Playing information
- Position: Lock, Prop
Club
Years	Team	Pld	T	G	FG	P
2021–22	Penrith Panthers	9	0	0	0	0
2023–	Parramatta Eels	62	7	0	0	28
	Total	71	7	0	0	28
Representative
Years	Team	Pld	T	G	FG	P
2023–24	Indigenous All Stars	2	0	0	0	0
2024	Queensland	1	0	0	0	0
- Source: As of 22 March 2026

J'maine Dale Hopgood (born 11 May 1999) is an Australian professional rugby league footballer who plays as a lock forward for the Parramatta Eels in the National Rugby League.

He previously played for the Penrith Panthers in the NRL.

== Early life ==
Hopgood was born in Hervey Bay, Queensland. He grew up playing for the Hervey Bay Seagulls before moving to Caloundra, Queensland at age 16, where he played for the Caloundra Sharks.

Hopgood's father Dale died of a heart attack on 24 March 2007, aged 39, less than an hour after playing a match for the Seagulls.

== Playing career ==
=== Early career ===
In 2017, Hopgood captained Penrith's S. G. Ball Cup (under-18s) squad during his first season at the club. Later that same year, he played for the Queensland under-18s team.

In 2019, Hopgood played for the Queensland under-20s team.

=== 2021 ===
Hopgood was promoted to Penrith's 30-man NRL squad ahead of the 2021 NRL season.

Hopgood made his first grade debut for Penrith in their round 10 match against the Gold Coast on 16 May 2021, as part of the Magic Round. Hopgood's debut was publicly announced on the Tuesday prior, his 22nd birthday.

=== 2022 ===
On 1 June, Hopgood signed a two-year deal to join Parramatta. It was reported that Hopgood had a verbal agreement to join North Queensland for the 2023 NRL season but decided to join the Parramatta club instead. Hopgood captained Penrith's NSW Cup team to the 2022 premiership defeating Canterbury in the grand final. Hopgood was also named the 2022 NSW Cup player of the year. On 2 October, Hopgood scored two tries and was named man of the match in Penrith's 44–10 victory over Norths Devils in the 2022 NRL State Championship final.

=== 2023 ===
Hopgood represented the Indigenous All Stars in the 2023 All Stars match.

Hopgood made his club debut for Parramatta in round 1 of the 2023 NRL season against Melbourne which saw the club lose 16–12 in golden point extra-time. In round 3 against Manly, Hopgood threw a wild offload in the final five minutes of the match as Parramatta were narrowly behind the scoreboard. The pass was taken by Manly player Haumole Olakau'atu who raced away to score the match winning try. Parramatta would lose the game 34–30. In May, Hopgood re-signed with Parramatta until the end of 2025. In round 11, Hopgood scored his first try for Parramatta in their 26–18 loss against Canberra. Hopgood played a total of 24 matches for Parramatta in the 2023 NRL season as the club finished 10th and missed the finals.

=== 2024 ===
On 27 May, Hopgood was selected by Queensland ahead of the 2024 State of Origin series. He had little involvement in the match, but was on the receiving end of a crunching tackle from former Panthers teammate Liam Martin. On 16 June, Hopgood was not selected by Queensland for game two after failing to recover from a back injury. On 27 June, it was announced that Hopgood would miss the remainder of the 2024 NRL season after requiring back surgery. On 28 August 2024, it was announced that Hopgood had extended his contract with Parramatta until the end of the 2027 season.

=== 2025 ===
On 30 January, Hopgood was named in the Parramatta leadership group after the club announced Mitchell Moses as team captain. Hopgood played every game for Parramatta in the 2025 NRL season as the club finished 11th on the table.

=== 2026 ===
On 23 March, Hopgood was ruled out for the rest of the season after suffering an ACL injury in round 3.

== Statistics ==
Year	Team	Games	Tries	Pts
2021	Penrith Panthers	5		
2022	Penrith Panthers	4		
2023	Parramatta Eels	24	4	16
2024	Parramatta Eels	12	1	4
2025	Parramatta Eels	24	2	8
2026	Parramatta Eels	2		
	Totals	71	7	28
