= Josh Jackson (rugby league) =

Australia international rugby league footballer

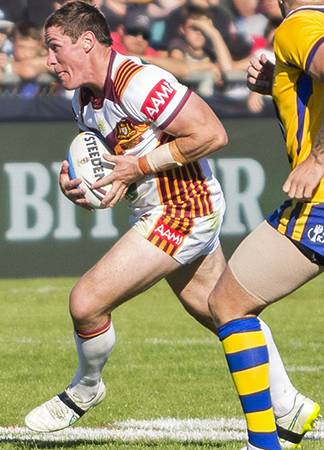

Personal information
- Full name: Joshua Jackson
- Born: 8 January 1991 (age 35) Gulgong, New South Wales, Australia
- Height: 180 cm (5 ft 11 in)
- Weight: 99 kg (15 st 8 lb)

Playing information
- Position: Second-row, Lock
Club
Years	Team	Pld	T	G	FG	P
2012–22	Canterbury Bulldogs	241	24	0	0	96
Representative
Years	Team	Pld	T	G	FG	P
2013–15	NSW Country	3	0	0	0	0
2014	Australia	2	0	0	0	0
2015–17	New South Wales	9	0	0	0	0
2017	Prime Minister's XIII	1	0	0	0	0
- Source: As of 16 December 2023

Josh Jackson (born 8 January 1991) is a former Australian professional rugby league footballer who played as a second-row forward and was the captain of the Canterbury-Bankstown Bulldogs in the NRL.

At representative level he has played for NSW Country, New South Wales in the State of Origin series, and Australia.

== Background ==
Jackson was born in Gulgong in the Central Tablelands region of New South Wales, Australia.

He played his junior football for the Gulgong Bull Terriers and Mudgee Dragons. In 2007 his family moved to Newcastle, New South Wales. In Newcastle, Jackson played for the Valentine-Eleebana Red Devils and Lakes United Seagulls. In 2009, he was signed by the Newcastle Knights. He played for the Knights' S. G. Ball Cup team.

== Professional playing career ==
He played for Canterbury's NYC team in 2010 and 2011, playing over 50 games, before graduating to the Bulldogs' New South Wales Cup reserve-grade team in 2012. In Round 16 of the 2012 NRL season, Jackson made his NRL debut for Canterbury-Bankstown against the Melbourne Storm. Later that year, he'd run on in the 2012 NRL Grand Final for Canterbury as they finished runners-up to Melbourne. Jackson has developed a reputation as an uncompromising, rugged and hard-working second rower. He is a strong defender and competent attacking player on Canterbury's right edge. He has reasonable ball skills that have enabled him to play five-eighth on occasion. In 2013, Jackson was selected for the Country team to play the City in the annual City vs Country Origin match. A season later, he was selected for the Australian Kangaroos for the Four Nations tournament. He made his Test debut in Australia's 44-18 win over Samoa, and was later selected in the final against New Zealand, which Australia lost 22-18. Jackson played 28 games for Canterbury in the 2014 NRL season as the club reached the 2014 NRL Grand Final against South Sydney but were defeated 30-6 at ANZ Stadium. On 3 May 2015, Jackson played for New South Wales Country against New South Wales City in the 2015 City vs Country Origin. In 2016, Josh Jackson received the Brad Fittler Medal as New South Wales' best player in that year's Origin series.

In 2017, Jackson was controversially awarded Man of the Match for his performance in State of Origin II in Sydney despite playing just 49 out of 80 minutes and having a limited role in attack. He was the first player in a losing side to be awarded man of the match in over a decade. In 2018, Jackson was left out of The NSW state of origin squad despite winning the award as NSW's best player in The 2017 series. Jackson played 24 games for Canterbury in the 2019 NRL season as the club finished a disappointing 12th on the table. On 22 December 2019, Jackson signed a three-year contract extension to remain at Canterbury-Bankstown until the end of the 2023 season. Jackson made a total of 17 appearances for Canterbury in the 2021 NRL season as the club finished last and claimed the Wooden Spoon. Jackson played 23 games for Canterbury in the 2022 NRL season which saw the club finish 12th on the table and miss the finals. On 27 October 2022, Jackson announced his retirement from rugby league.

== Post playing ==
After retiring from the NRL, Jackson remained at the Bulldogs and joined the staff as a strength and conditioning coach. In 2023, Jackson was inducted as a life member of the Bulldogs. In 2024, Jackson coached the Bulldogs Jersey Flegg squad.
