= Kurt Falls =

Australian rugby league player

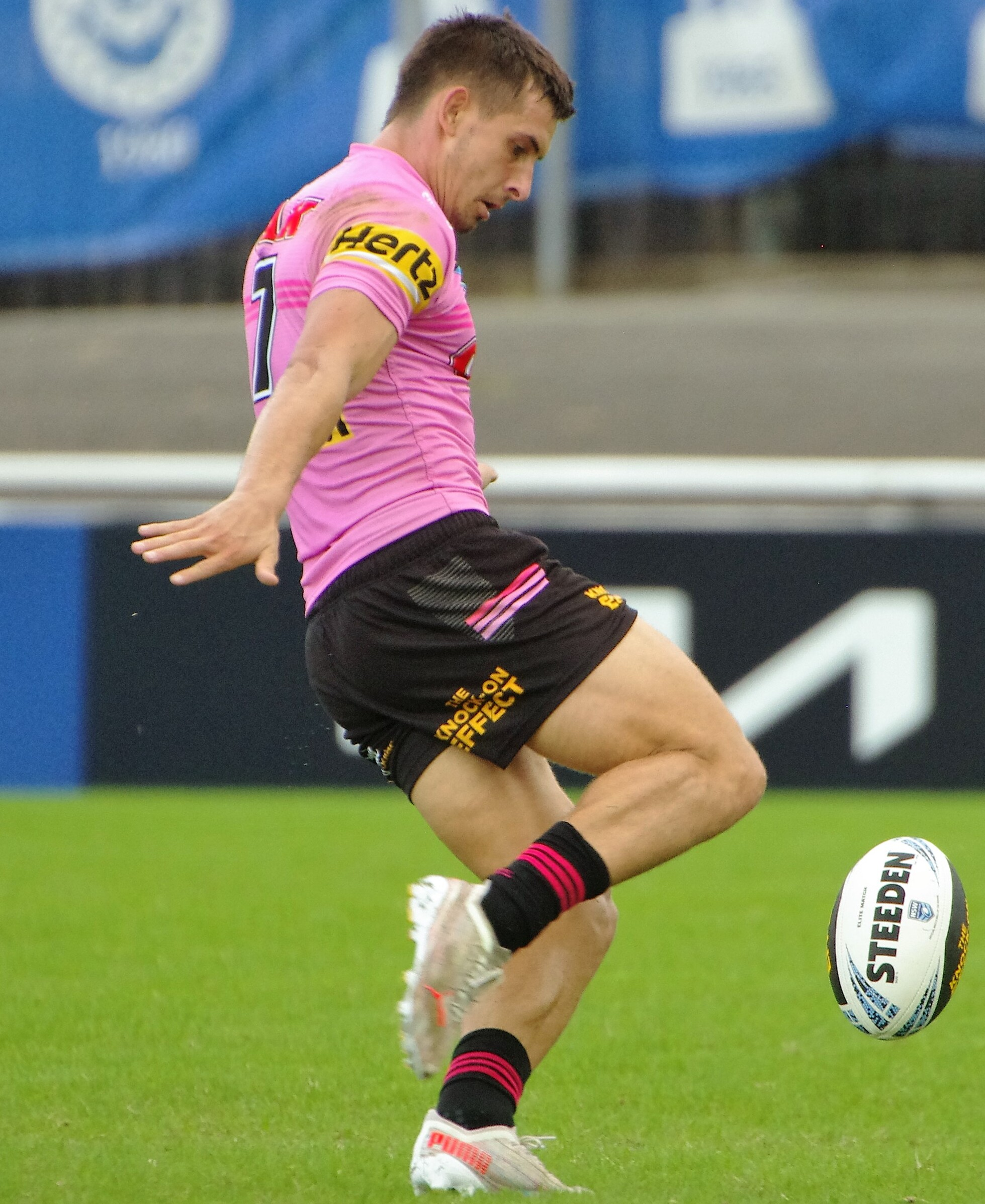

Personal information
- Born: 13 August 1996 (age 30) Penrith, New South Wales, Australia
- Height: 184 cm (6 ft 0 in)
- Weight: 92 kg (14 st 7 lb)

Playing information
- Position: Five-eighth
Club
Years	Team	Pld	T	G	FG	P
2022	Penrith Panthers	3	0	7	0	14
2024	Brisbane Broncos	0	0	0	0	0
	Total	3	0	7	0	14
- Source: As of 25 June 2023

Kurt Falls (born 13 August 1996) is an Australian professional rugby league footballer who plays as a five-eighth or halfback for the Western Suburbs Magpies in the New South Wales Cup. He previously played for the Penrith Panthers and Brisbane Broncos.

== Background ==
Falls graduated from St Dominic's College, Penrith in 2014 and played alongside Nathan Cleary in the Schoolboy Trophy winning team of 2014. He scored the match-winning try in the Grand Final. He played his junior rugby league with Brothers Penrith.

== Playing career ==
Falls joined the Penrith Panthers in 2021. In round 13 of the 2022 NRL season, at almost 26 years of age, Falls made his first grade debut for the Penrith Panthers in his side's 30−18 victory over the Canterbury-Bankstown Bulldogs at Penrith Stadium. Falls kicked five conversions in the match. Falls spent the majority of 2022 playing for Penrith's NSW Cup team. Falls scored a try and kicked four goals in Penrith's 29-22 victory over Canterbury in the 2022 NSW Cup Grand Final. On 2 October 2022, Falls played in Penrith's 44-10 victory over Norths Devils in the NRL State Championship final. Falls was released by Penrith at the end of the 2022 NRL season, however he remained at the club in 2023 on a development contract playing in the NSW Cup.

Falls joined the Brisbane Broncos on a train and trial contract for the 2024 pre-season. In 2025, Falls joined Western Suburbs in the NSW Cup. In 2026, Falls played in Penrith's NSW Cup Grand Final victory over Newtown.
