= Declan Casey =

Australian rugby league footballer

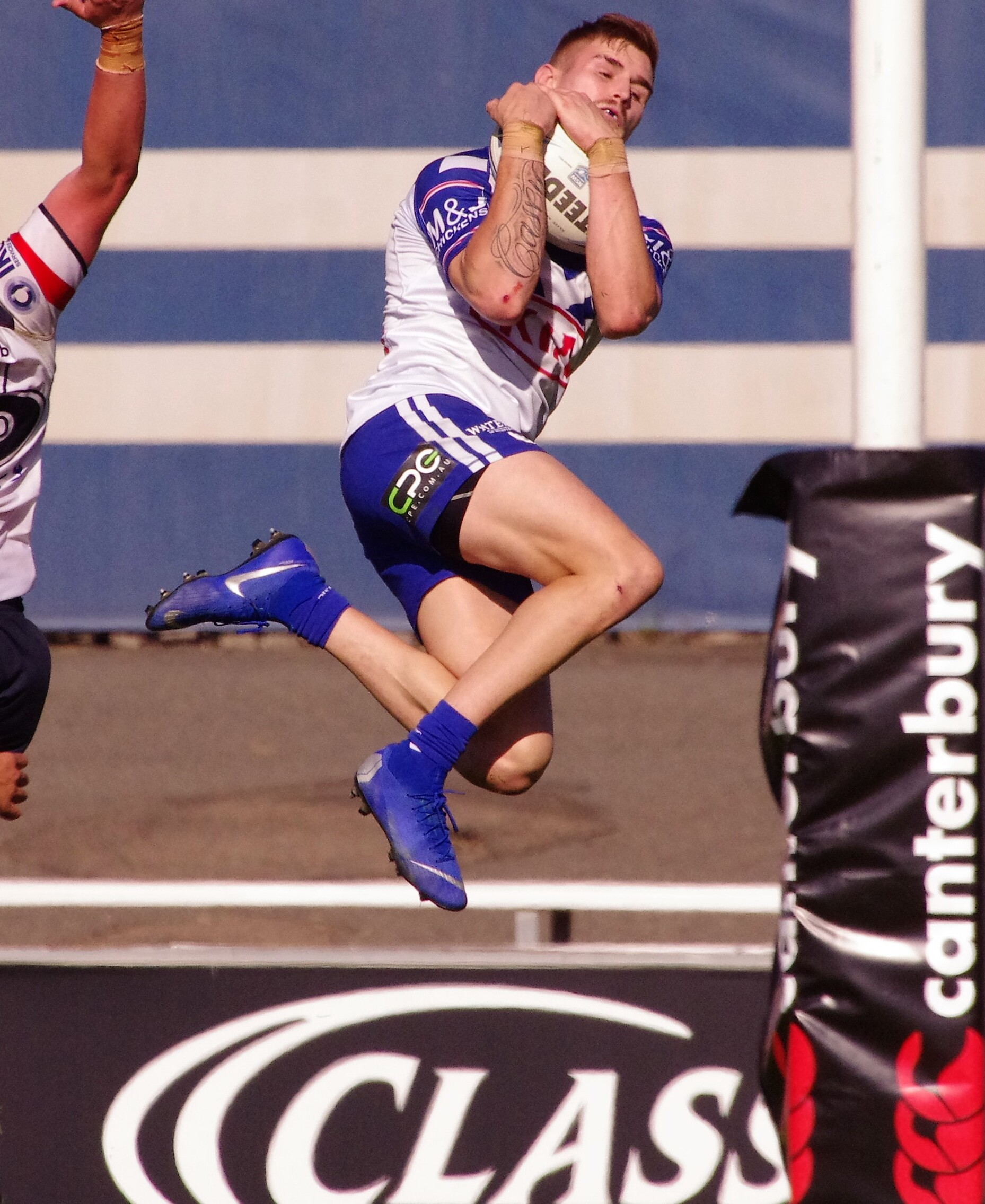

Personal information
- Born: 24 January 2000 (age 25); Sutherland, New South Wales, Australia
- Height: 189 cm (6 ft 2 in)
- Weight: 92 kg (14 st 7 lb)

Playing information
- Position: Centre, Wing, Fullback
Club
| Years | Team | Pld | T | G | FG | P |
|---|---|---|---|---|---|---|
| 2022–23 | Canterbury Bulldogs | 6 | 2 | 0 | 0 | 8 |
| 2024– | Wests Tigers | 1 | 0 | 0 | 0 | 0 |
| | Total | 7 | 2 | 0 | 0 | 8 |
- Source: As of 24 May 2024

Declan Casey (born 24 January 2000) is an Australian professional rugby league footballer who plays for the Wests Tigers in the National Rugby League. He can play wing, centre and fullback.

== Background ==
He is the son of former St George Dragons and North Sydney Bears player Stephen Casey.

== Playing career ==
=== 2022 ===
Casey made his NRL debut in round 16 of the 2022 NRL season against the Cronulla-Sutherland Sharks. Casey’s NRL debut was cut short after a sickening head knock in Canterbury's 18-6 loss to the Cronulla side which saw the 22-year-old taken from the field on a medi cab. Casey was knocked to the ground in the 52nd minute after attempting a tackle on Cronulla prop Andrew Fifita.

Casey played for Canterbury's NSW Cup team in their 29-22 grand final loss to Penrith with Casey scoring a try during the game.

=== 2023 ===
On 27 October, Casey announced on Instagram that he was leaving the Canterbury club after four years. On 21 November, it was announced by the Wests Tigers that they had offered Casey a train and trial deal ahead of the 2024 NRL season.
