= Christian Crichton =

Samoa international rugby league footballer

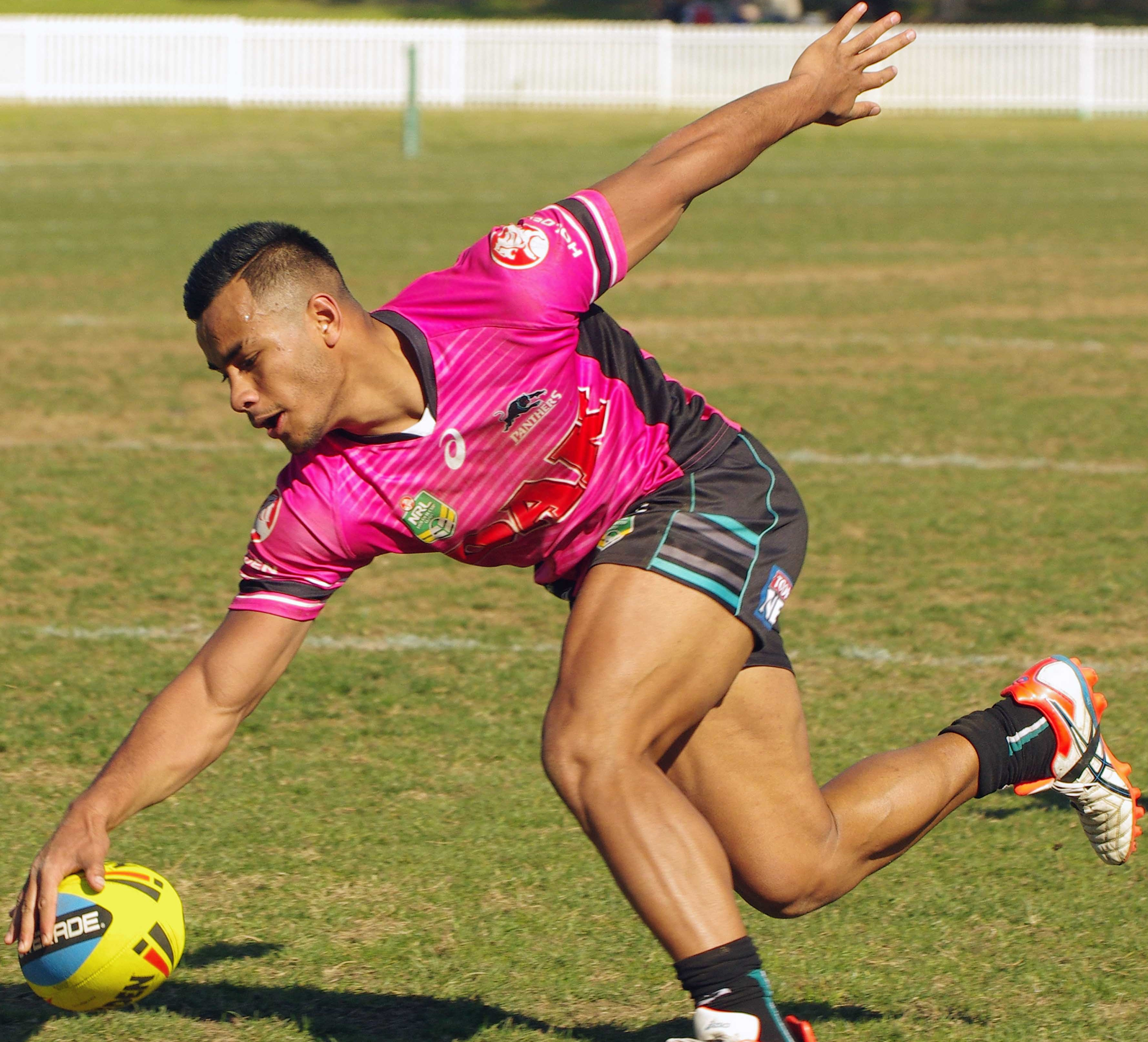

Personal information
- Born: 12 July 1996 (age 30) Apia, Samoa
- Height: 182 cm (6 ft 0 in)
- Weight: 100 kg (15 st 10 lb)

Playing information
- Position: Wing
Club
Years	Team	Pld	T	G	FG	P
2018	Penrith Panthers	20	4	0	0	16
2019–21	Canterbury Bulldogs	13	3	0	0	12
2022	Penrith Panthers	1	0	0	0	0
	Total	34	7	0	0	28
Representative
Years	Team	Pld	T	G	FG	P
2018	Samoa	1	0	0	0	0
- Source: As of 19 March 2021
- Relatives: Stephen Crichton (brother)

Christian Crichton (born 12 July 1996) is a Samoan professional rugby league footballer who plays on the wing for St Mary's Saints in the Ron Massey Cup and for Samoa at international level.

He previously played for the Penrith Panthers and Canterbury-Bankstown Bulldogs in the National Rugby League.

== Background ==
Crichton was born in Apia, Samoa, and moved to Australia during his teenage years. He is the older brother of Canterbury-Bankstown Bulldogs player Stephen Crichton.

He played his junior rugby league for St Marys Saints in Penrith, New South Wales before being signed by the Penrith Panthers.

== Playing career ==
=== Early years ===
From 2014 to 2016, Crichton played for the Penrith Panthers' NYC team, before graduating to their Intrust Super Premiership NSW team in 2017.

=== 2018 ===
Following an injury to Dallin Watene-Zelezniak, Crichton made his NRL debut in round 3 of the 2018 NRL season against the Canterbury-Bankstown Bulldogs. In round 6, Crichton scored his first NRL try in the Panthers' 35–12 victory over the Gold Coast Titans at Penrith Stadium. In May, he signed a 3-year contract with the Canterbury-Bankstown Bulldogs starting in 2019.

=== 2019 ===
Crichton made his debut for Canterbury-Bankstown against the New Zealand Warriors in Round 1 scoring a try in a 40–6 loss. The following week, Canterbury were defeated by arch rivals Parramatta 36–16. As a result, Crichton was demoted to reserve grade by coach Dean Pay for the following week.

On 6 May, Crichton was selected for the Canterbury Cup NSW residents side to play against the Queensland residents representative team.

=== 2020 ===
Crichton was placed on report in the opening round of the 2020 NRL season against arch rivals Parramatta after hitting Maika Sivo with a late high tackle. Canterbury would go on to lose the match 8–2.

=== 2021 ===
Crichton was ruled out of the entire 2021 NRL season after suffering a knee injury in pre-season training.

=== 2022 ===
Crichton only made one appearance for the Penrith first grade side in 2022. Crichton spent the majority of the year playing for the clubs NSW Cup side. Crichton played for Penrith in their 2022 NSW Cup Grand Final victory over Canterbury.

=== 2025 ===
On 13 September, Crichton played in St Mary's Ron Massey Cup Grand Final victory over Wentworthville.
