= David Tangata-Toa =

Australian rugby league footballer & coach

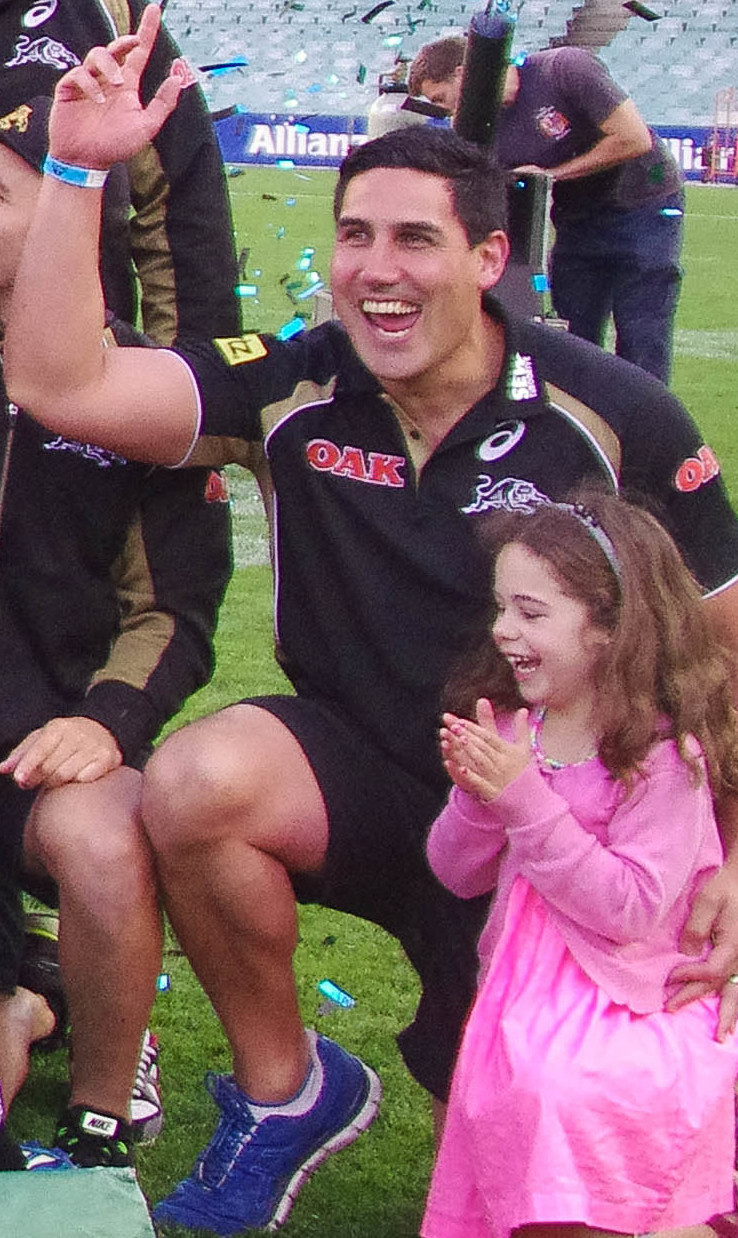

Personal information
- Born: 15 July 1981 (age 45) Gold Coast, Queensland, Australia

Playing information
- Height: 187 cm (6 ft 2 in)
- Weight: 114 kg (17 st 13 lb)
- Position: Prop
Club
Years	Team	Pld	T	G	FG	P
2005–07	Hull Kingston Rovers	77	14	0	0	56
2008–09	Celtic Crusaders	46	9	0	0	32
	Total	123	23	0	0	88
- Relatives: Andrew Tangata-Toa (brother)

David Tangata-Toa (born 15 July 1981) is an Australian professional rugby league coach who is the head coach of the New Zealand Warriors in the New South Wales Cup, and an assistant coach at the Warriors in the NRL. He is former professional rugby league footballer who played as a prop for Hull Kingston Rovers and the Celtic Crusaders in the Super League.

== Background ==
Born on the Gold Coast, Queensland, Tangata-Toa played junior rugby league for the Burleigh Bears and attended Palm Beach Currumbin State High School.

== Playing career ==
A lower grader with the St George Illawarra Dragons and Cronulla Sharks, Tangata-Toa moved to England in 2005, joining Hull Kingston Rovers in the National League One. In 2006, he played in their National League One Grand Final winning side, helping them earn promotion to the Super League. In 2007, he played 17 Super League games for the club, scoring three tries.

In 2008, Tangata-Toa joined the Celtic Crusaders, scoring a try in their National League One Grand Final loss to the Salford City Reds. In 2009, he played 19 Super League games for the Crusaders, scoring four tries.

== Coaching career ==
In 2011, Tangata-Toa became captain-coach of the Windsor Wolves in the Bundaberg Red Cup. In 2012, he moved up to Windsor's NSW Cup side as an assistant coach.

In 2013, Tangata-Toa joined the Penrith Panthers as an assistant coach to their under-20 side. In Round 7, Tangata-Toa replaced Garth Brennan, who moved up to the club's NSW Cup side, as the head coach. Brennan later returned to the role before the finals series began. From 2014 to 2016, he worked as an assistant coach to the Panthers' NSW Cup side. In 2016, he became the assistant coach of the Tongan national team under head coach Kristian Woolf.

In 2017, he once again took charge of Penrith's under-20 side, leading them to the finals.

In 2018, Tangata-Toa became head coach of the Townsville Blackhawks under-20 side, where he led the side to the minor premiership and Grand Final. In 2019, he joined the North Queensland Cowboys as an assistant coach.

On 21 September, Tangata-Toa joined the Canterbury-Bankstown Bulldogs as a transition coach after two years with the Cowboys.

== Personal life ==
Tangata-Toa's older brother, Andrew, is a former professional rugby league player.
