= Eisenhuth =

Eisenhuth is a surname. Notable people with the surname include:

- Laura J. Eisenhuth (1859–1937), American politician
- Matt Eisenhuth (born 1992), Australian professional rugby league footballer
- Tom Eisenhuth (born 1992), Australian professional rugby league footballer

== See also ==
- Eisenhuth Horseless Vehicle Company, a manufacturer of Brass Age automobiles
