= Andrew Hope =

Andrew Hope may refer to:

- Andrew Hope (politician) (1896–1968), American politician in Alaska from the Tlingit tribe
- Andrew Hope III (1949–2008), Tlingit Native rights activist and educator
- Andrew Hope, Earl of Hopetoun (born 1969), heir apparent of Adrian Hope, 4th Marquess of Linlithgow
- Andrew Hope, plaintiff in Hope & Brown v NIB Health Funds

== See also ==
- Andrew Hope Davidson (1895–1967), professor of midwifery
