= 2025 State of Origin series =

Australian rugby league series

- Won by: Queensland (25th title)
- Series margin: 2–1
- Points scored: 110
- Attendance: 189,762 (ave. 63,254 per match)
- Player of the series: Tom Dearden (Wally Lewis Medal)
- Top points scorer(s): Valentine Holmes (20); Brian To'o (20)
- Top try scorer(s): Brian To'o (5)

The 2025 State of Origin series was the 44th annual best-of-three series between the Queensland and New South Wales men’s rugby league teams. Before this series, Queensland had won 24 times, NSW 17 times, with two series drawn. The first game was hosted at Suncorp Stadium on 28 May 2025. It is the first series to be held since Laurie Daley returned to coach New South Wales for a second stint.

== Game I ==
28 May 2025
20:05 AEST

| Queensland | 6–18 | New South Wales |
|---|---|---|
| Tries: 1 Coates 45'; Goals: 1 Holmes 1/2 pen 39' | 1st: 2–14; 2nd: 4–4; Report | Tries: 4 Lomax 24', 35'; To'o 28'; Edwards 72'; Goals: 1 Cleary 1/4 pen 9'; Lomax 0/1; Sin bin: To'o (yellow card) 39' to 49' |

Suncorp Stadium, Brisbane
Attendance: 52,483
Referee: Ashley Klein
Player of the Match: Payne Haas

== Game II ==
18 June 2025
18:05 AWST

| Queensland | 26–24 | New South Wales |
|---|---|---|
| Tries: 4 Tabuai-Fidow 12', 19'; Munster 28'; Capewell 36'; Goals: 5 Holmes 5/5 13', 20', pen 28', 32', 38' | 1st: 26–6; 2nd: 0–18; Report | Tries: 5 To'o 6', 45', 64'; S. Crichton 56'; A. Crichton 71'; Goals: 2 Lomax 2/5 8', 73' |

Optus Stadium, Perth
Attendance: 57,023
Referee: Ashley Klein
Player of the Match: Cameron Munster

== Game III ==
9 July 2025
20:05 AEST

| New South Wales | 12–24 | Queensland |
|---|---|---|
| Tries: 2 S. Crichton 55'; To'o 79'; Goals: 2 Lomax 2/2 56', 79' | 1st: 0–20; 2nd: 12–4; Report | Tries: 4 Coates 17'; Dearden 26', 73'; Grant 36'; Goals: 4 Holmes 4/5 pen 7', 18', 27', 39' |

Accor Stadium, Sydney
Attendance: 80,256
Referee: Ashley Klein
Player of the Match: Tom Dearden

== Teams ==
=== New South Wales Blues ===
| Position | Game 1 | Game 2 | Game 3 |
|---|---|---|---|
| Fullback | Dylan Edwards | | |
| Wing | Brian To'o | | |
| Centre | Stephen Crichton | | |
| Centre | Latrell Mitchell | | |
| Wing | Zac Lomax | | |
| Five-eighth | Mitchell Moses | Jarome Luai | |
| Halfback | Nathan Cleary | | |
| Prop | Mitchell Barnett | Max King | |
| Hooker | Reece Robson | | |
| Prop | Payne Haas | | |
| Second row | Liam Martin | | |
| Second row | Angus Crichton | | |
| Lock | Isaah Yeo (c) | | |
| Interchange | Connor Watson | | |
| Interchange | Spencer Leniu | | |
| Interchange | Hudson Young | | |
| Interchange | Max King | Stefano Utoikamanu | |
| Replacement | Campbell Graham | Matt Burton | Jacob Kiraz |
| Reserve | Stefano Utoikamanu | Jacob Preston | Lindsay Smith |
| Reserve | Haumole Olakau'atu | Lindsay Smith | Bradman Best |
| Coach | Laurie Daley | | |

=== Queensland Maroons ===
| Position | Game 1 | Game 2 | Game 3 |
|---|---|---|---|
| Fullback | Kalyn Ponga | | Hamiso Tabuai-Fidow |
| Wing | Xavier Coates | | |
| Centre | Robert Toia | | |
| Centre | Hamiso Tabuai-Fidow | Valentine Holmes | Gehamat Shibasaki |
| Wing | Valentine Holmes | Hamiso Tabuai-Fidow | Valentine Holmes |
| Five-eighth | Cameron Munster | Cameron Munster (c) | |
| Halfback | Daly Cherry-Evans (c) | Tom Dearden | |
| Prop | Moeaki Fotuaika | | Josh Papali'i |
| Hooker | Harry Grant | | |
| Prop | Tino Fa'asuamaleaui | | |
| Second row | Reuben Cotter | | |
| Second row | Jeremiah Nanai | Kurt Capewell | |
| Lock | Patrick Carrigan | Trent Loiero | |
| Interchange | Tom Dearden | Kurt Mann | |
| Interchange | Lindsay Collins | | |
| Interchange | Beau Fermor | Jeremiah Nanai | Patrick Carrigan |
| Interchange | Trent Loiero | Patrick Carrigan | Jeremiah Nanai |
| Replacement | Kurt Mann | Ezra Mam | Reece Walsh |
| Reserve | Jesse Arthars | Jack Howarth | J'maine Hopgood |
| Reserve | Kulikefu Finefeuiaki | Corey Horsburgh | Josh Kerr |
| Coach | Billy Slater | | |

=== Debutants ===
Game I

- Cap no. 319, Max King
- Cap no. 232, Robert Toia
- Cap no. 233, Beau Fermor
- Cap no. 234, Trent Loiero

Game II

- Cap no. 235, Kurt Mann

Game III

- Cap no. 236, Gehamat Shibasaki

== Men's Under 19 State of Origin ==
19 June 2025
19:45 AEST

| Queensland | 23–22 | New South Wales |
|---|---|---|
| Tries: 4 Bai 9'; Garton 19'; Black 36'; Laine-Sietu 63'; Goals: 3 Black 2/3 10', 21'; Andrews 1/1 65' | 1st: 13–6; 2nd: 10–16; Report | Tries: 4 Halangahu 28'; Stanley-Traill 47'; Hopwood 51'; Allen 53'; Goals: 3 Votano 3/4 30', 49', 53'; Sin bin: Uta (yellow card) 21' to 31' |

Sunshine Coast Stadium, Sunshine Coast, Queensland
Referee: Liam Kennedy
Player of the Match: Javon Andrews

Team details

| FB | 1 | Raymond Puru |
| WG | 2 | Phillip Coates |
| CE | 3 | Prestyn Laine-Sietu |
| CE | 4 | Sam Stephenson |
| WG | 5 | Sunny Kama |
| FE | 6 | Javon Andrews |
| HB | 7 | Coby Black |
| PR | 8 | Oliva Smith |
| HK | 9 | Jai Bowden |
| PR | 10 | Bodhi Sharpley |
| SR | 11 | Zac Garton |
| SR | 12 | Jac Finigan |
| LK | 13 | Cooper Bai |
Interchange:
| IN | 14 | Hayden Watson |
| IN | 15 | Samuel Hyne |
| IN | 16 | Kobi Floro |
| IN | 17 | Kilarney Lavender |
| CS | 18 | Amaziah Murgha (not used) |
Coach: Darius Boyd

| FB | 1 | Connor Votano |
| WG | 2 | Luke Laulilii |
| CE | 3 | Hayden Buchanan |
| CE | 4 | Nikora Williams |
| WG | 5 | Jethro Rinakama |
| FE | 6 | Toby Rodwell |
| HB | 7 | Mitchell Woods |
| PR | 8 | Cody Hopwood |
| HK | 9 | Jaxson Allen |
| PR | 10 | Cooper Clarke |
| SR | 11 | Jacob Halangahu |
| SR | 12 | Jezaiah Funa-Iuta |
| LF | 13 | Jordan Uta |
Interchange:
| IN | 14 | Zane Harrison |
| IN | 15 | Cyrus Stanley-Traill |
| IN | 16 | Hokafonu Lemoto |
| IN | 17 | Kanaan Magele |
| CS | 18 | Heamasi Makasini (not used) |
Coach: Josh Jackson

== Women's State of Origin ==
The 2025 Women's State of Origin was the second time that the competition was played as a three-game series. On 1 May, New South Wales won the opening game 32–12 at Suncorp Stadium, Brisbane. On 15 May, New South Wales claimed the series with a 26–6 win at Allianz Stadium, Sydney. On 27 June, Queensland won the final game 18–14 at McDonald Jones Stadium, Newcastle. The under-19s game, which was played as a double-header with the men's under-19s game, was won 26–10 by New South Wales.

== See also ==
- 2025 Women's State of Origin
- 2025 NRL season
- 2025 NRL Women's season
