= Johnny King =

Australia international rugby league footballer and coach

Personal information
- Full name: Johnny Cecil King
- Born: 2 July 1942 (age 84) Gilgandra, New South Wales, Australia

Playing information
- Position: Wing
Club
Years	Team	Pld	T	G	FG	P
1960–71	St. George	191	143	7	0	443
Representative
Years	Team	Pld	T	G	FG	P
1963–70	New South Wales	10	11	5	0	43
1966–70	City Firsts	5	3	0	0	9
1966–70	Australia	15	8	0	0	24

Coaching information
Club
Years	Team	Gms	W	D	L	W%
1976	South Sydney	22	8	0	14	36
- Source: As of 11 June 2013
- Relatives: Max King (grandson)

Johnny Cecil King (born 2 July 1942) is an Australian former rugby league footballer and coach. He was a winger with the St. George Dragons for the last seven years of their eleven consecutive premiership-winning run from 1956 to 1966. He was a representative in the Australian national team from 1966 to 1970, earning 15 Test caps. He has been named among the nation's finest footballers of the 20th century.

== Early life ==
The formative years of King's early life were spent in Gilgandra, although prior to starting school his family was in Sydney. His father, Cec King, had grown up in Gilgandra, become a motor mechanic there, and commenced playing rugby league for the town's team before he enlisted in 1940 in the AIF. Cec King played rugby league in Sydney while enlisted. He was with the South Sydney Rabbitohs, playing 19 matches in South's reserves and first grade in 1944 and 1945. As a talented runner, Cec was a winger (as his son would later be).

When WWII ended, Johnny was a very young child and Cec and his family remained in Sydney while Cec concentrated in 1946 on athletics training with coach K.I. Smith. Smith owned two taxis and King shared taxi driving shifts with two other runners in Smith's training squad. Cec King competed in several well-known "Gifts" (sprint foot-races with prize money) and won Victoria's 1946 Nyah Gift, competed in the Wagga Gift in January 1947 and won the prestigious Canberra Gift in March 1947. Also in 1947 he played rugby league with Souths again, in Souths Juniors' 'Fernleigh' side.

When Johnny was five years old in 1948, Cec returned to Gilgandra and worked again as a mechanic. Predicting his own future, Johnny went as a footballer to a Gilgandra children's fancy-dress ball and won a prize. From then Johnny grew up in the town except for the part-year his father was rugby league captain/coach 30 miles east at Gulgong in the 1949 season, and the part-year period from mid 1952 when Cec had a foreman position at Gulargambone 30 miles north.

Cec King and his wife set a strong sporting example to their son. An all-round athlete himself, Cec continued playing for the Gilgandra rugby league side up to 1955. He was the club's secretary for a time. He also played each season in the local cricket competition. He regularly played golf. John's mother also played in Gilgandra golf competitions.

Johnny King left school to become an apprentice to the local jeweller, Norman Noonan, who was involved in the Gilgandra Football Club and other sporting clubs. However, Mr Noonan died in 1958 when Johnny was 16. As he could only complete his training by leaving Gilgandra, he moved to Sydney to do so. In Sydney in 1958 he joined the Arncliffe Scots D grade junior rugby league side as a fullback, and the following year played in the St George Dragons' Presidents Cup side. Also in 1959, at his father's instigation, he trialled with his father's old club, the South Sydney Rabbitohs but was turned down by coach Bernie Purcell as being "too small".

== Club career ==
He was graded in 1960 to the St. George Dragons third grade side and towards of the end of the 1960 season played five games on the wing in first grade including the 1960 Grand Final victory over the Eastern Suburbs Roosters in which he scored two tries.

King scored the only try of the 1964 Grand Final at the end of an extraordinary passage of play. The Balmain Tigers were desperately defending their own line five minutes into the second half when they were awarded a relieving penalty. Their kicker, Bob Boland, failed to find touch by inches as the ball fell into the outstretched hands of Saints fullback Graeme Langlands who then raced across field and sent a long cut-out pass to Billy Smith 25 yards out from the tryline. Smith off-loaded to King, who sped the remaining 20 yards down the left wing and scored a diving try.

King played 191 games for the Dragons between 1960 and 1971 scoring 143 tries – a club record at the time. He played in seven of the Dragons' consecutive premiership victories and holds the distinctive record of scoring six tries over six consecutive winning Grand Final appearances from 1960 to 1965.

Johnny King was the NSW Rugby League's leading try-scorer twice in his career: firstly in 1961 (20 tries) and again in 1965 (15 tries).

He retired after one match of the 1971 season following a motor vehicle accident in which he suffered three crushed vertebrae.

== The man and his playing style ==
King was a positional winger with good speed. He formed a left-centre, left-wing partnership with Australian rugby league Immortal Reg Gasnier and scored many of his 143 club tries by positioning himself to finish off after breaks by his inside men.

Between the 1964 and 1965 seasons King showed incredible fortitude to recover from a serious lawnmower accident in which his foot was partially severed to be running and fully fit for round seven of 1965. He would play out the season and end it as the Dragons leading try scorer, despite having missed the first six games. The 1965 season saw King score yet another Grand Final try. and then go on to top form and national selection in 1966.

== Representative career ==
He first played for New South Wales against a touring Great Britain side in 1962 and then again in 1963, 1964 and 1965. He was at that time vying for the national wing position against his great club rivals Ken Irvine, Peter Dimond and Michael Cleary. He later represented New South Wales in 1969 and 1970 and scored nine career tries for the Blues.

He finally made his Australian Test debut in the 1966 domestic Ashes series against Great Britain where he appeared in all three Tests. He was selected on the 1967 Kangaroo tour making six Test appearances and playing in twelve minor tour matches. He was the tour's second highest try scorer with a tally of nine.

He was in the Australian squad for the 1968 World Cup and made two tournament appearances scoring two tries. He made a single Test appearance against New Zealand in 1967 and played his three final Test matches against the touring Great Britain Lions of 1970. He is listed on the Australian Players Register as Kangaroo No. 404.

== Post playing ==
After football King returned to central-western New South Wales and ran a hotel in Wellington where he also coached the town's rugby league team. From then, he made a new career managing hotels and clubs. In 1974, he coached Western Division to a surprise victory over Penrith in the inaugural Amco Cup Final 1974. Returning to Sydney in 1976 he coached South Sydney Rabbitohs for one season. In 1984 John King coached Country Seconds to an upset win over Sydney.

King is the grandfather of the rugby league footballer; Max King.

== Accolades ==
He was awarded Life Membership of the St. George Dragons club in 1992.

In February 2008, King was named in the list of Australia's 100 Greatest Players (1908–2007) which was commissioned by the NRL and ARL to celebrate the code's centenary year in Australia. On 20 July 2022, King was named in the St. George Dragons District Rugby League Clubs team of the century.

== First class matches played ==
Team	Matches	Years	Tries	Points
St. George Dragons	191	1960–1971	143	443
New South Wales	8	1963–1970	9	27
Australia (Tests)	15	1966–1970	6	18
Australia (World Cup)	2	1968	2	6

== Sources ==
- Writer, Larry (1995) Never Before, Never Again, Pan MacMillan, Sydney
- Andrews, Malcolm (2006) "The ABC of RugbY League", Australian Broadcasting Corpn, Sydney
- Whiticker, Alan & Hudson, Glen (2006) The Encyclopedia of Rugby League Players, Gavin Allen Publishing, Sydney
- Heads, Ian (2014) 'The Night the Music Died: How a Bunch of Bushies Forged Rugby League's Last Great Fairytale', Stoke Hill Press, Sydney.
