= 2019 Melbourne Storm season =

- NRL Rank: 1st (Minor Premier)
- Play-off result: Preliminary Final Loss
- 2019 record: Wins: 20; draws: 0; losses: 4
- Points scored: For: 631; against: 300

Team information
- CEO: Dave Donaghy
- Coach: Craig Bellamy
- Captain: Cameron Smith (27 Games)
- Stadium: AAMI Park - 30,050; Suncorp Stadium - 52,500 (1 Game)
- Avg. attendance: 18,230
- High attendance: 41,612 (at Suncorp Stadium)

Top scorers
- Tries: Josh Addo-Carr (14)
- Goals: Cameron Smith (99)
- Points: Cameron Smith (206)
← 2018	List of seasons	2020 →

The 2019 Melbourne Storm season was the 22nd in the club's history, competing in the 2019 NRL season. The team was coached by Craig Bellamy, who coached the club for his 17th consecutive season. Melbourne Storm were captained by Cameron Smith, who had been the sole captain for the team since 2008. On 13 July 2019 Smith became the first NRL player to play 400 NRL games. On 31 August 2019 the Storm defeated the Manly Sea Eagles to win their fourth J. J. Giltinan Shield as the minor premiers.

== Season summary ==
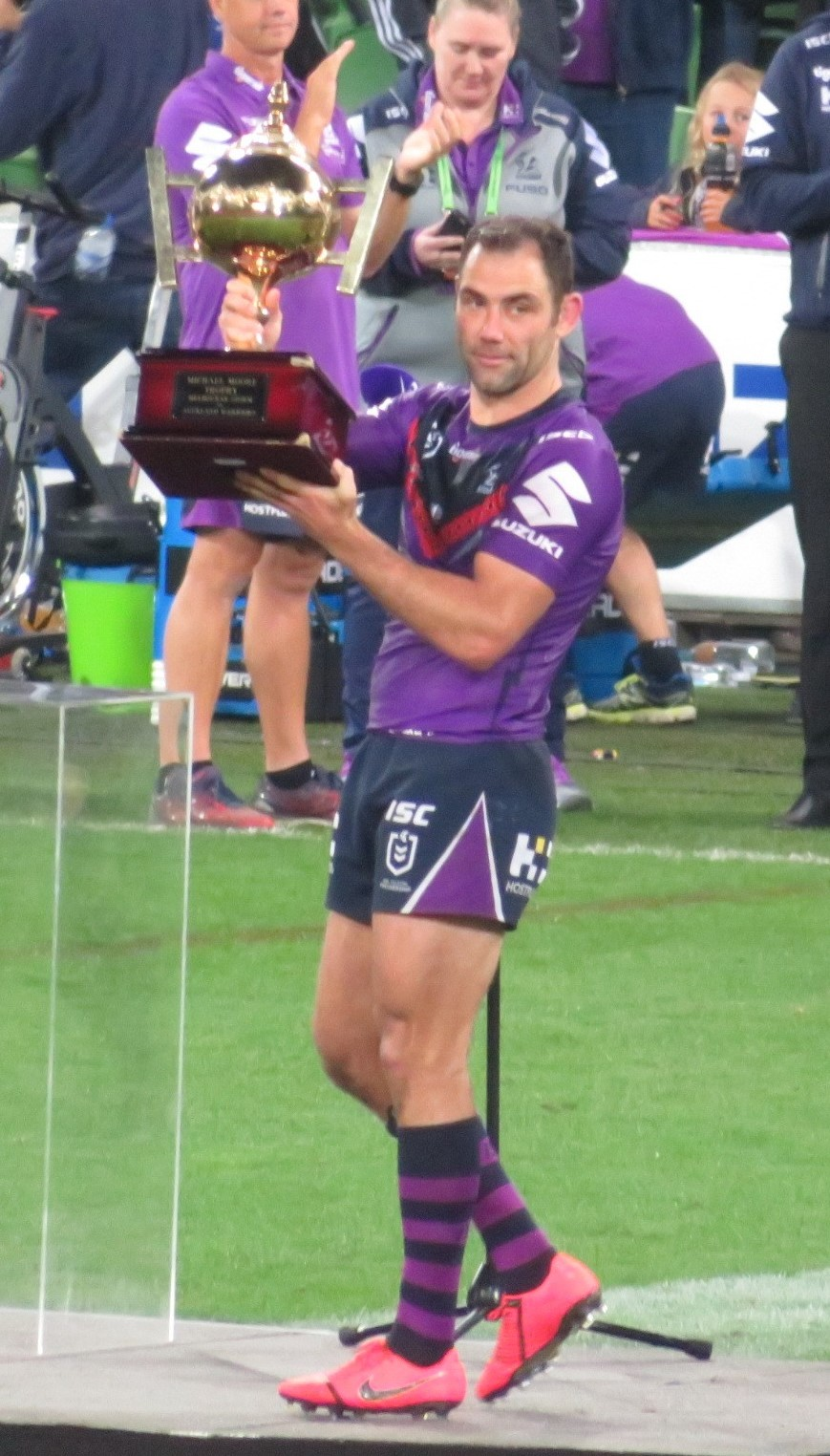
Cameron Smith holding the Michael Moore Trophy

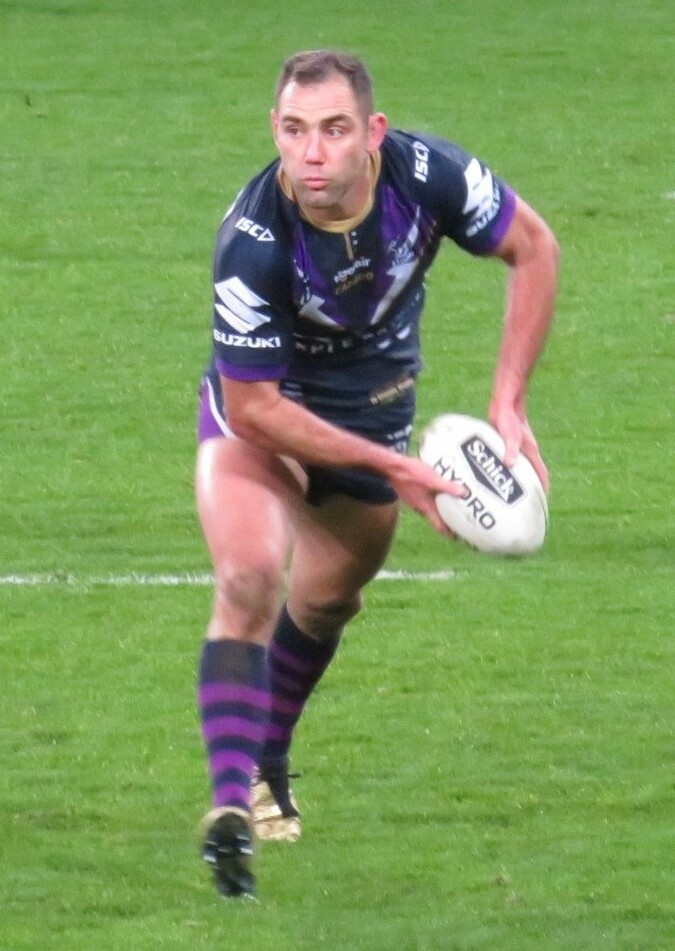
Cameron Smith playing his 400th NRL match

- Pre-season – New recruits took part in Melbourne Storm IDQ camp for pre season training before New Years. Tom Eisenhuth was awarded the IDQ Iron bar with special recognition to both Sandor Earl & Nicho Hynes.
- Round 1 – Prior to the commencement of play, the northern stand of AAMI Park was renamed "The Slater Stand" after Billy Slater. Storm defeated the Broncos 22–12 extending their winning streak in Round 1 to 17 seasons. Tom Eisenhuth makes Storm debut.
- Round 3 – Storm defeat the Panthers 32–2 in Bathurst, Marion Seve scores his first NRL try
- Round 5 – Cameron Smith becomes the game's highest ever points scorer with penalty goal in the 48th minute. Smith finished the game on 2422 points. Sandor Earl made his debut for the Storm and also played his first game following a four year ban from the game.
- Round 9 – The NRL stage their first Magic Round at Brisbane's Suncorp Stadium. The Storm completed one of the biggest wins in the club's history dominating the Parramatta Eels 64-10. Will Chambers played game 200.
- Round 11 – The Storm defeat the Bulldogs away at Belmore Oval Sydney with Cameron Smith playing his 500th first grade game. Cameron Munster also played his 100th Game.
- Round 16 – Missing 7 players due to State of Origin, Storm win 16–14 against St George Illawarra. The game was notable due to the large number of milestones; with Cameron Smith scoring his 2500th career point, Sandor Earl played his 50th NRL game, Craig Bellamy coached his 300th win and both Tino Fa'asuamaleaui and Billy Walters making their playing debuts.
- Round 17 – Cameron Smith becomes the first NRL player to play in 400 NRL games in the Storm's 40-16 win over Cronulla.
- Round 19 – Cameron Smith captains his 300th NRL Game.
- Round 22 – The Storm lose to the Canberra Raiders 22–18 after leading 18–0 shortly before half time. This result meant that it was the Storm's worst collapse in the history of the club.
- Round 24 – Storm defeat the Manly Sea Eagles 36-6 and clinch the J. J. Giltinan Shield as the minor premiers for 2019. Nelson Asofa-Solomaona also played his 100th game.

=== Milestone games ===
Round	Player	Milestone
Round 1	Tom Eisenhuth	Storm debut
Round 2	Marion Seve	NRL debut
Round 4	Ryan Papenhuyzen	NRL debut
Round 5	Sandor Earl	Storm debut
Round 5	Cameron Smith	NRL points scoring record
Round 9	Will Chambers	200th Game
Round 11	Cameron Munster	100th Game
Round 15	Felise Kaufusi	100th Game
Round 16	Tino Faasuamaleaui	NRL debut
Round 16	Billy Walters	NRL debut
Round 16	Cameron Smith	2500th point
Round 16	Sandor Earl	50th Game
Round 16	Craig Bellamy	300th win as coach
Round 17	Cameron Smith	400th Game
Round 20	Cameron Smith	300th Game as Captain
Round 21	Nicho Hynes	NRL debut
Round 21	Joe Stimson	50th Game
Round 22	Max King	Storm debut
Round 24	Nelson Asofa-Solomona	100th Game
Prelim Final	Kenny Bromwich	150th Game

== Fixtures ==
=== Pre-season ===
Date	Round	Opponent	Venue	Result	Mel.	Opp.	Source
23 February	Trial	New Zealand Warriors	GMHBA Stadium, Geelong	Lost	6	12	
2 March	Trial	North Queensland Cowboys	BB Print Stadium, Mackay	Lost	6	14	

=== Regular season ===
Round	1	2	3	4	5	6	7	8	9	10	11	12	13	14	15	16	17	18	19	20	21	22	23	24	25
Ground	H	A	A	H	A	H	H	A	N	H	A	–	A	H	A	A	H	A	H	A	A	H	H	A	H
Result	W	W	W	W	W	L	W	L	W	W	W	B	W	W	W	W	W	W	L	W	W	L	W	W	W
Position	5	4	1	1	1	1	2	4	3	2	2	1	1	1	1	1	1	1	1	1	1	1	1	1	1
Points	2	4	6	8	10	10	12	12	14	16	18	20	22	24	26	28	30	32	32	34	36	36	38	40	42

Source: Rugby League Tables
A = Away; H = Home; N = Neutral; B = Bye; W = Win; D = Draw; L = Loss

=== Matches ===
- (GP) - Golden Point extra time
- (pen) - Penalty try

Date	Round	Opponent	Venue	Result	Mel.	Opp.	Tries	Goals	Field Goals	Report
14 March	1	Brisbane Broncos	AAMI Park, Melbourne	Won	22	12	J Hughes, C Scott, K Bromwich, J Bromwich	C Smith 3/4		
22 March	2	Canberra Raiders	GIO Stadium, Canberra	Won	22	10	S Vunivalu (3), N Asofa-Solomona	C Smith 3/5		
30 March	3	Penrith Panthers	Carrington Park, Bathurst, New South Wales	Won	32	2	C Munster, B Croft, J Addo-Carr, M Seve, J Bromwich	C Smith 6/6, B Croft 0/1		
7 April	4	Canterbury Bulldogs	AAMI Park, Melbourne	Won	18	16	W Chambers (pen), T Kamikamica, C Munster	C Smith 3/3		
12 April	5	North Queensland Cowboys	1300SMILES Stadium, Townsville	Won	18	12	J Addo-Carr (2), W Chambers	C Smith 3/5		
19 April	6	Sydney Roosters	AAMI Park, Melbourne	Lost (GP)	20	21	J Addo-Carr, T Kamikamica, C Scott	B Croft 4/4	B Croft 0/2	
25 April	7	New Zealand Warriors	AAMI Park, Melbourne	Won	13	12	C Munster, J Hughes	C Munster 2/3	B Croft 1/1	
3 May	8	Cronulla Sharks	Shark Park, Sydney	Lost	18	20	J Addo-Carr, J Bromwich, R Papenhuyzen	C Smith 3/4		
11 May	9	Parramatta Eels	Suncorp Stadium, Brisbane	Won	64	10	C Munster (2), J Addo-Carr (2), D Finucane, J Hughes, C Scott, S Vunivalu, B Croft, R Papenhuyzen, K Bromwich	C Smith 9/11, W Chambers 1/1		
16 May	10	Wests Tigers	AAMI Park, Melbourne	Won	24	22	R Papenhuyzen, F Kaufusi, M Seve, W Chambers	C Smith 3/4		
26 May	11	Canterbury Bulldogs	Belmore Sports Ground, Sydney	Won	28	6	J Addo Carr (2), W Chambers, N Asofa-Solomona	C Smith 5/6, R Papenhuyzen 1/1		
	12	Bye								
8 June	13	New Zealand Warriors	Mt Smart Stadium, Auckland	Won	32	10	J Hughes (2), S Vunivalu, J Bromwich, M Seve	C Smith 6/7		
15 June	14	Newcastle Knights	AAMI Park, Melbourne	Won	34	4	J Stimson (2), J Addo-Carr, J Hughes, M Seve, S Vunivalu	C Smith 5/5, R Papenhuyzen 0/1		
28 June	15	Sydney Roosters	Adelaide Oval, Adelaide	Won	14	12	R Papenhuyzen, B Croft	C Smith 3/3		
4 July	16	St George-Illawarra Dragons	WIN Stadium, Wollongong	Won	16	14	J Stimson, J Hughes	C Smith 4/4		
13 July	17	Cronulla Sharks	AAMI Park, Melbourne	Won	40	16	B Smith (2), C Munster, B Croft, J Olam, J Stimson	C Smith 8/9		
21 July	18	Gold Coast Titans	Cbus Super Stadium, Gold Coast	Won	38	18	S Vunivalu (2), J Stimson, S Earl, R Papenhuyzen, C Smith, J Olam	C Smith 5/6, J Stimson 0/1		
27 July	19	Manly Sea Eagles	AAMI Park, Melbourne	Lost (GP)	10	11	W Chambers, B Smith	C Smith 1/2	B Croft 0/2, CMunster 0/1, C Smith 0/1	
2 August	20	Brisbane Broncos	Suncorp Stadium, Brisbane	Won	40	4	K Bromwich (2), J Addo-Carr, C Welch, J Hughes, C Smith, R Papenhuyzen	C Smith 6/9		
11 August	21	South Sydney Rabbitohs	Central Coast Stadium, Gosford	Won	26	16	J Bromwich, J Olam, C Munster, B Croft	C Smith 5/6		
17 August	22	Canberra Raiders	AAMI Park, Melbourne	Lost	18	22	J Olam, J Addo-Carr, S Vunivalu	C Smith 3/3		
25 August	23	Gold Coast Titans	AAMI Park, Melbourne	Won	24	8	K Bromwich, R Papenhuyzen, J Addo-Carr, D Finucane	C Smith 4/5		
31 August	24	Manly Sea Eagles	Lottoland, Sydney	Won	36	6	J Olam (3), J Addo-Carr, N Asofa-Solomona, R Papenhuyzen	C Smith 6/7		
6 September	25	North Queensland Cowboys	AAMI Park, Melbourne	Won	24	16	S Earl, N Asofa-Solomona, W Chambers, M King	C Smith 4/5		

=== Finals ===
Date	Round	Opponent	Venue	Result	Mel.	Opp.	Tries	Goals	Field Goals	Report
14 September	Week 1 - Qualifying Final	Canberra Raiders	AAMI Park, Melbourne	Lost	10	12	S Vunivalu	C Smith 3/4		
21 September	Week 2 - Semi Final	Parramatta Eels	AAMI Park, Melbourne	Won	32	0	J Addo-Carr (2), S Vunivalu, C Munster, J Hughes, R Papenhuyzen, N Asofa-Solomona	C Smith 1/6, R Papenhuyzen 1/1, C Munster 0/1		
28 September	Week 3 - Preliminary Final	Sydney Roosters	Sydney Cricket Ground, Sydney	Lost	6	14	N Asofa-Solomona	C Smith 1/1		

=== Ladder ===
2019 NRL season
Pos	Team	Pld	W	D	L	B	PF	PA	PD	Pts
1	Melbourne Storm	24	20	0	4	1	631	300	+331	42
2	Sydney Roosters	24	17	0	7	1	627	363	+264	36
3	South Sydney Rabbitohs	24	16	0	8	1	521	417	+104	34
4	Canberra Raiders	24	15	0	9	1	524	374	+150	32
5	Parramatta Eels	24	14	0	10	1	533	473	+60	30
6	Manly-Warringah Sea Eagles	24	14	0	10	1	496	446	+50	30
7	Cronulla-Sutherland Sharks	24	12	0	12	1	514	464	+50	26
8	Brisbane Broncos	24	11	1	12	1	432	489	−57	25
9	Wests Tigers	24	11	0	13	1	475	486	−11	24
10	Penrith Panthers	24	11	0	13	1	413	474	−61	24
11	Newcastle Knights	24	10	0	14	1	485	522	−37	22
12	Canterbury-Bankstown Bulldogs	24	10	0	14	1	326	477	−151	22
13	New Zealand Warriors	24	9	1	14	1	433	574	−141	21
14	North Queensland Cowboys	24	9	0	15	1	378	500	−122	20
15	St. George Illawarra Dragons	24	8	0	16	1	427	575	−148	18
16	Gold Coast Titans	24	4	0	20	1	370	651	−281	10

== Coaching staff ==
- Craig Bellamy – Head Coach
- Jason Ryles – Senior Assistant Coach
- Marc Brentnall – Assistant Coach
- Ben Jack – U/20s Head Coach
- Aaron Bellamy – Development Coach
- Ryan Hinchcliffe – Development Coach
- Frank Ponissi – Football Director
- Ryan Hoffman – Football Administration Coordinator
- Nick Maxwell – Leadership Coach
- Craig McRae – Kicking & Catching Coach
- Billy Slater – Specialist Coach (Part time)
- Scott Sipple – Easts Tigers Feeder Club Coach
- Craig Ingebrigtsen – Sunshine Coast Falcons Feeder Club Coach

== 2019 Squad ==
List current as of 24 March 2019

Cap (Note: Players are listed with the cap number as they appear on the Melbourne Storm honour board. Additional squad members do not have a cap number.)	Nat.	Player name	Position	First Storm Game	Previous First Grade RL club (Note: This column denotes the previous rugby league club the player was signed to and played first grade rugby league for. If they are yet to debut then this is stipulated. If they were merely signed to the club but did not play then it is not counted.)
55	(Australia)	Cameron Smith (c)	HK	2002	(Australia) Melbourne Storm
97	(Australia)	Will Chambers	CE	2007	(Australia) Melbourne Storm
119	(New Zealand)	Jesse Bromwich	PR	2010	(Australia) Melbourne Storm
149	(New Zealand)	Kenny Bromwich	PR, SR, LK	2013	(Australia) Melbourne Storm
160	(Australia)	Cameron Munster	FE, FB	2014	(Australia) Melbourne Storm
163	(Australia)	Dale Finucane	PR, SR, LK	2015	(Australia) Canterbury Bulldogs
164	(Tonga)	Felise Kaufusi	PR	2015	(Australia) Melbourne Storm
166	(New Zealand)	Nelson Asofa-Solomona	SR, PR	2015	(Australia) Melbourne Storm
167	(Australia)	Christian Welch	SR, PR	2015	(Australia) Melbourne Storm
170	(Australia)	Curtis Scott	CE, WG	2016	(Australia) Melbourne Storm
171	(Fiji)	Suliasi Vunivalu	WG	2016	(Australia) Melbourne Storm
174	(Australia)	Brodie Croft	HB	2016	(Australia) Melbourne Storm
176	(Australia)	Josh Addo-Carr	WG, FB	2017	(Australia) Wests Tigers
179	(Australia)	Joe Stimson	SR, LK	2017	(Australia) Melbourne Storm
181	(Fiji)	Tui Kamikamica	SR, PR	2017	(Australia) Melbourne Storm
182	(New Zealand)	Brandon Smith	HK	2017	(Australia) Melbourne Storm
184	(New Zealand)	Jahrome Hughes	FE, FB	2017	(Australia) North Queensland Cowboys
187	(Papua New Guinea)	Justin Olam	WG, CE	2018	(Australia) Melbourne Storm
188	(Australia)	Harry Grant	HK	2018	(Australia) Melbourne Storm
189	(Tonga)	Patrick Kaufusi	PR	2018	(Australia) North Queensland Cowboys
190	(Tonga)	Albert Vete	PR	2018	(Australia) New Zealand Warriors
192	(Australia)	Tom Eisenhuth	SR	2019	(Australia) Penrith Panthers
193	(Samoa)	Marion Seve	WG	2019	(Australia) Melbourne Storm
194	(Australia)	Ryan Papenhuyzen	FB	2019	(Australia) Melbourne Storm
195	(New Zealand)	Sandor Earl	WG	2019	(Australia) Canberra Raiders
196	(Australia)	Billy Walters	FE	2019	(Australia) Melbourne Storm
197	(Samoa)	Tino Fa'asuamaleaui	PR	2019	(Australia) Melbourne Storm
198	(Australia)	Nicho Hynes	FB	2019	(Australia) Melbourne Storm
199	(Australia)	Max King	PR	2019	(Australia) Gold Coast Titans
—	(New Zealand)	Kayleb Milne	SR	Yet to debut	(Australia) Melbourne Storm
—	(Australia)	Cooper Johns	FE	Yet to debut	(Australia) Melbourne Storm
—	(Tonga)	Solomone Kata	CE	Yet to debut	(Australia) New Zealand Warriors
—	(Fiji)	Isaac Lumelume	WG	Yet to debut	(Australia) Cronulla Sharks
—	(New Zealand)	Aaron Pene	PR	Yet to debut	(Australia) Melbourne Storm
—	(Australia)	Darryn Schonig	PR	Yet to debut	(Australia) Melbourne Storm

== Player movements ==
Losses

- Cheyse Blair to Castleford Tigers (mid season)
- Scott Drinkwater to North Queensland Cowboys (mid season)
- Louis Geraghty to Gold Coast Titans
- Tim Glasby to Newcastle Knights
- Ryan Hoffman to Retired
- Ryley Jacks to Gold Coast Titans
- Sam Kasiano to Catalans Dragons (mid season)
- Billy Slater to Retired
- Lachlan Timm to Gold Coast Titans
- Sale Finau to Newcastle Knights
- Junior Ratuva to Canterbury Crusaders
- Patrick Kaufusi to St George Illawarra Dragons (mid season)

Gains

- Nicho Hynes from Sunshine Coast Falcons
- Solomone Kata from New Zealand Warriors (mid season)
- Max King from Gold Coast Titans (mid season)
- Isaac Lumelume from Cronulla Sharks (mid season)

== Representative honours ==
This table lists all players who have played a representative match in 2019.

Player	2019 All Stars match	State of Origin 1	2019 Oceania Cup R1 and Internationals	State of Origin 2	State of Origin 3	Rugby League World Cup 9s	2019 Oceania Cup Rds 2 and 3
Josh Addo-Carr	Indigenous All Stars	New South Wales	—N/a	New South Wales	New South Wales	Australia	Australia
Nelson Asofa-Solomona	—N/a	—N/a	New Zealand	—N/a	—N/a	—N/a	—N/a
Jesse Bromwich	Maori All Stars	—N/a	New Zealand	—N/a	—N/a	—N/a	—N/a
Kenny Bromwich	Maori All Stars	—N/a	New Zealand	—N/a	—N/a	—N/a	New Zealand
Will Chambers	Indigenous All Stars	Queensland	—N/a	Queensland	Queensland	—N/a	—N/a
Tino Fa'asuamaleaui	—N/a	—N/a	—N/a	—N/a	—N/a	Samoa	Samoa
Dale Finucane	—N/a	—N/a	—N/a	New South Wales	New South Wales	—N/a	—N/a
Jahrome Hughes	Maori All Stars	—N/a	New Zealand	—N/a	—N/a	—N/a	New Zealand
Tui Kamikamica	—N/a	—N/a	Fiji	—N/a	—N/a	—N/a	Fiji
Felise Kaufusi	—N/a	Queensland	—N/a	Queensland	Queensland	—N/a	—N/a
Isaac Lumelume	—N/a	—N/a	—N/a	—N/a	—N/a	Fiji	Fiji
Cameron Munster	—N/a	Queensland	—N/a	Queensland	Queensland	—N/a	Australia
Justin Olam	—N/a	—N/a	—N/a	—N/a	—N/a	Papua New Guinea	—N/a
Ryan Papenhuyzen	—N/a	—N/a	—N/a	—N/a	—N/a	Australia	—N/a
Marion Seve	—N/a	—N/a	Samoa	—N/a	—N/a	Samoa	Samoa
Brandon Smith	Maori All Stars	—N/a	New Zealand	—N/a	—N/a	—N/a	New Zealand
Suliasi Vunivalu	—N/a	—N/a	Fiji	—N/a	—N/a	Fiji	Fiji
Christian Welch	—N/a	—N/a	—N/a	—N/a	Queensland	—N/a	—N/a

== Statistics ==
This table contains playing statistics for all Melbourne Storm players to have played in the 2019 NRL season.

- Table updated as at end of season
- Statistics sources:

Name	Appearances	Tries	Goals	Field Goals	Points
Josh Addo-Carr	23	16	0	0	64
Nelson Asofa-Solomona	27	6	0	0	24
Jesse Bromwich	27	5	0	0	20
Kenny Bromwich	27	5	0	0	20
Will Chambers	24	6	1	0	26
Brodie Croft	22	5	4	1	29
Sandor Earl	6	2	0	0	8
Tom Eisenhuth	4	0	0	0	0
Tino Fa'asuamaleaui	5	0	0	0	0
Dale Finucane	26	2	0	0	8
Harry Grant	1	0	0	0	0
Jahrome Hughes	24	9	0	0	36
Nicho Hynes	1	0	0	0	0
Tui Kamikamica	21	2	0	0	8
Felise Kaufusi	25	1	0	0	4
Patrick Kaufusi	1	0	0	0	0
Max King	6	1	0	0	4
Cameron Munster	24	8	2	0	36
Justin Olam	14	7	0	0	28
Ryan Papenhuyzen	22	9	2	0	40
Curtis Scott	9	3	0	0	12
Marion Seve	12	4	0	0	16
Brandon Smith	23	3	0	0	12
Cameron Smith	27	2	104	0	216
Joe Stimson	13	5	0	0	20
Suliasi Vunivalu	24	11	0	0	44
Billy Walters	2	0	0	0	0
Christian Welch	16	1	0	0	4
Albert Vete	1	0	0	0	0
29 players used	—	113	113	1	679

=== Scorers ===
Most points in a game: 18 points

- Round 9 – Cameron Smith (9 Goals) vs Parramatta Eels

Most tries in a game: 3

- Round 2 – Suliasi Vunivalu vs Canberra Raiders
- Round 24 – Justin Olam vs Manly Sea Eagles

=== Winning games ===
Highest score in a winning game: 64 points

- Round 9 vs Parramatta Eels

Lowest score in a winning game: 13 points

- Round 7 vs New Zealand Warriors

Greatest winning margin: 54 points

- Round 9 vs Parramatta Eels

Greatest number of Games won consecutively: 9

- Round 9 – Round 18

=== Losing games ===
Highest score in a losing game: 20 points

- Round 6 vs Sydney Roosters

Lowest score in a losing game: 6 points

- Preliminary final vs Sydney Roosters

Greatest losing margin: 8 points

- Preliminary final vs Sydney Roosters

== Jersey ==
On 7 February the Storm announced that the 2019 Jersey will remain the same from 2018 however with updated NRL logos and the new 2019 Melbourne Storm logo. In addition the jersey now features the new Storm sponsor Purple Bricks.

Jersey choice
RD1	RD2	RD3	RD4	RD5	RD6	RD7	RD8	RD9	RD10	RD11	RD12	RD13	RD14	RD15	RD16	RD17	RD18	RD19	RD20	RD21	RD22	RD23	RD24	RD25	QF	SF	PF
Home	Home	Clash	Home	Clash	Home	ANZAC	Clash	Home	Home	Indigenous^{#}	—	Clash	Home	Clash	Home	CAM400^	Clash	Heritage^^	Clash	Clash	WIL^{&}	Home	Clash	Home	Home	Home	Clash

^{#} Designed by Lenny Briggs.
^ Special jersey designed for Cameron Smith's 400th NRL game.
^^ Heritage jersey inspired by the 2009 home jersey; celebrating both the 1999 NRL Grand Final premiership and 2009 NRL Grand Final winning teams.
^{&} Women in League jersey featuring pink thunderbolts motif.

== Awards ==
=== Trophy Cabinet ===
- 2019 J. J. Giltinan Shield
- 2019 Michael Moore Trophy

=== Melbourne Storm Awards Night ===
Held at Crown Palladium, Melbourne on Tuesday 8 October.

- Melbourne Storm Player of the Year: Dale Finucane
- Billy Slater Rookie of the Year: Ryan Papenhuyzen
- Melbourne Storm Members' Player of Year: Cameron Smith
- Melbourne Storm Most Improved: Tui Kamikamica
- Melbourne Storm Best Back: Jahrome Hughes
- Melbourne Storm Best Forward: Cameron Smith
- Cooper Cronk Feeder Club Player of the Year: Harry Grant
- Darren Bell U20s Player of the Year: Trent Toelau
- Greg Brentnall Young Achievers Award:
- Mick Moore Club Person of the Year:
- Life Member Inductee: Will Chambers
- Chairman's Award:
- Best Try: Josh Addo-Carr Semi-Final vs Eels

=== Dally M Awards Night ===
Held at The Star, Sydney on Wednesday 2 October 2019.

- Dally M Coach of the Year: Craig Bellamy
- Dally M Captain of the Year: Cameron Smith
- Dally M Hooker of the Year: Cameron Smith
- Dally M Five-Eight of the Year: Cameron Munster
- Dally M Interchange Player of the Year: Brandon Smith

=== Rugby League Players’ Association Awards Night ===
- RLPA Indigenous Academic Excellence Award: Josh Addo-Carr
- RLPA Five-Eighth of the Year: Cameron Munster
- RLPA Hooker of the Year: Cameron Smith
- RLPA Second Rower of the Year: Kenny Bromwich

=== Additional Awards ===
- I Don't Quit Iron Bar: Tom Eisenhuth
- Spirit of ANZAC Medal: Cameron Smith
- NSWRL True Blue Award: Josh Addo-Carr
- FOGS Peter Jackson Memorial Award: Cameron Munster
