= Bodhi Sharpley =

Australian rugby league footballer

Personal information
- Born: 2006 or 2007

Playing information
- Position: Lock
Club
| Years | Team | Pld | T | G | FG | P |
|---|---|---|---|---|---|---|
| 2026– | Gold Coast Titans | 3 | 1 | 0 | 0 | 4 |
- Source: RLP

Bodhi Sharpley is an Australian rugby league footballer for the Gold Coast Titans in the National Rugby League (NRL).

Sharpley was educated at St Mary's College, Toowoomba.

A middle forward, Sharpley played his junior rugby league for Brothers Toowoomba and the Western Clydesdales. He was a Queensland Country under-17s representative and played as a prop for Queensland under-19s in the 2025 State of Origin.

Sharpley came through the Gold Coast Titans pathways and trained with the first-grade side in the 2025 pre-season, gaining a train-and-trial contract. After building experience with the Tweed Seagulls in the 2026 Queensland Cup, Sharpley got an opportunity to play first-grade late in the NRL season, making three appearances off the bench.
