= Tooheys New =

Australian lager beer

- Manufacturer: Tooheys – Lion Nathan
- Introduced: 1930
- Alcohol by volume: 4.6%
- Style: Lager

Tooheys New is a standard Australian lager.

It can be found on tap at almost any bar in New South Wales and has historically been the state's number 1 beer.

== History ==
It was first brewed in 1931 and was marketed under the name Tooheys New Special. In the 1970s, the beer began being marketed as Tooheys New Special Draught when sold in cans and bottles, later shortened to Tooheys Draught. Tap beer was still sold as Tooheys New, however. In 1998, the company decided to sell the beer under one name across all modes as Tooheys New.

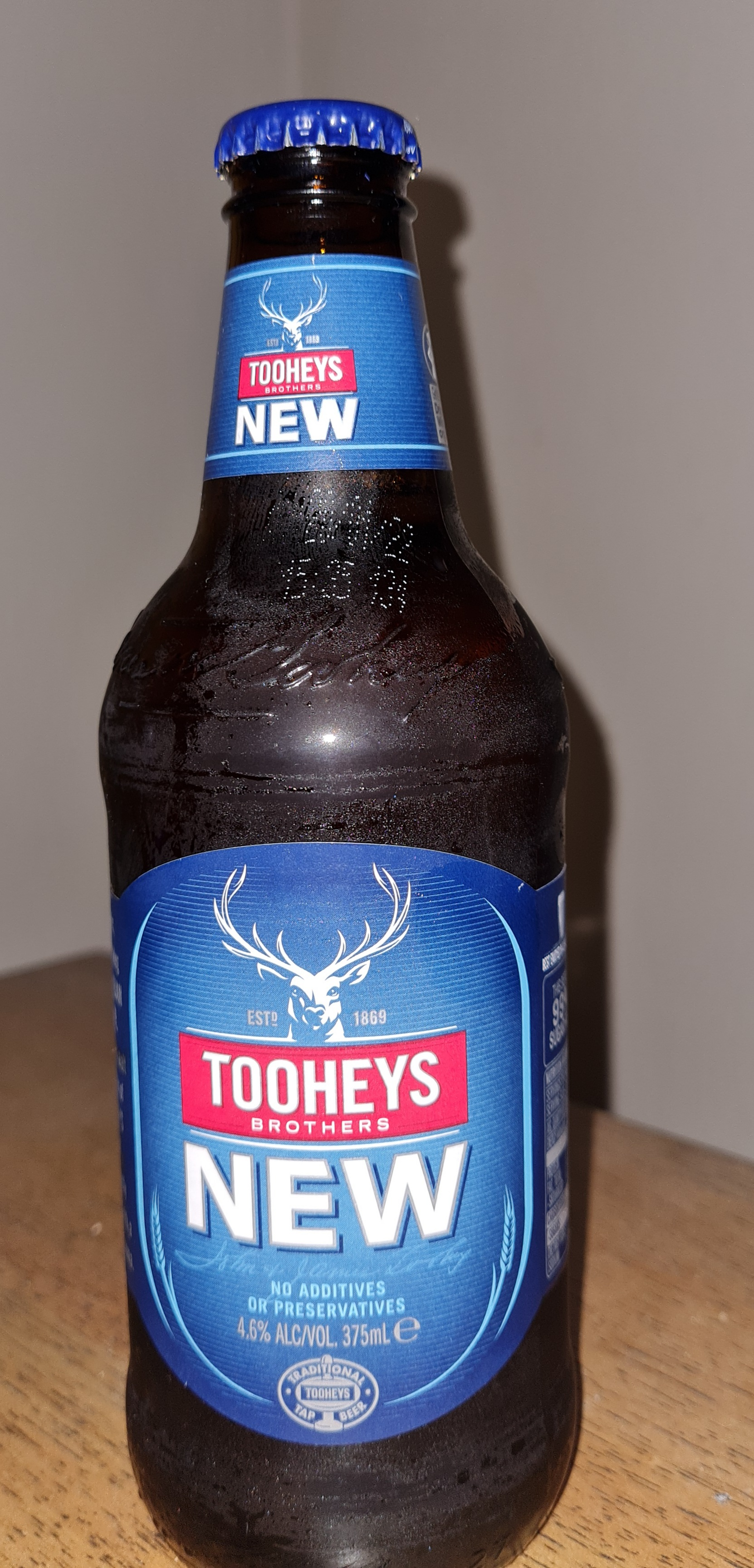
A 375ml bottle of Tooheys New from 2021

In the mid-1970s the beer was successfully promoted with a jingle 'I feel like a Tooheys or two', one of the more successful campaigns in Australian advertising. The jingle's ubiquitous presence registered such that when school children were tested and asked to complete the following: 'I feel like...’ For the vast majority there was only one right answer: 'A Tooheys' The jingle also made an impression on touring rocker David Bowie who sang it during the encore of his final Australian concert in 1978. Around 2008/09, Tooheys New began a marketing campaign, to have only 5 ingredients. Malt, hops, barley, yeast and sugar to break away from previous brew with many additives.

The pre-2023 logo

In 2023, the brand revived its iconic 'I feel like a Tooheys or two' advertising campaign as a part of an update to packaging and branding to create a more modern look whilst maintaining the core elements of the stag and the colours. One advertisement features a matchwinning chargedown in a rugby league game, while the other features a concert.

== Sponsorships ==
As the traditional number one beer in New South Wales, Tooheys New is also a major sponsor of the most popular sport in the state, rugby league. Tooheys New sponsors the New South Wales rugby league team in the annual State of Origin series. The Tooheys New logo appears on the Blues' sleeves. The team was previously known by the sponsored name of the Tooheys Blues. Tooheys New is also the sponsor of many Country Rugby League competitions across the state as well as being available at almost every rugby league venue in the state.

Tooheys New was also the official sponsor of the New South Wales Rugby Union's club competition (the Tooheys New Cup), and was also the official beer of the Wallabies and sponsors the Melbourne Cup. Through 2006, it was also naming sponsor of the Australian section of the Super 14 Rugby Competition, but was replaced by Investec Bank after their sponsorship contract expired. The brand also sponsored VFL clubs St Kilda and Sydney in the 1980s in an effort to nationalise the brand in southern and western states.

== White Stag ==
In September 2008, Tooheys came out with a low-carbohydrate beer product called Tooheys New White Stag. It is a full strength beer with the claim of "only one third of the carbs of standard full strength beers". The name has been re-used from Tooheys Stag lager released in 1930. Toohey's advertising blurb claims that New is equivalent to the old Stag lager.

== See also ==
- Australian pub
- Beer in Australia
- List of breweries in Australia
