= Matt Eisenhuth =

Australian rugby league footballer

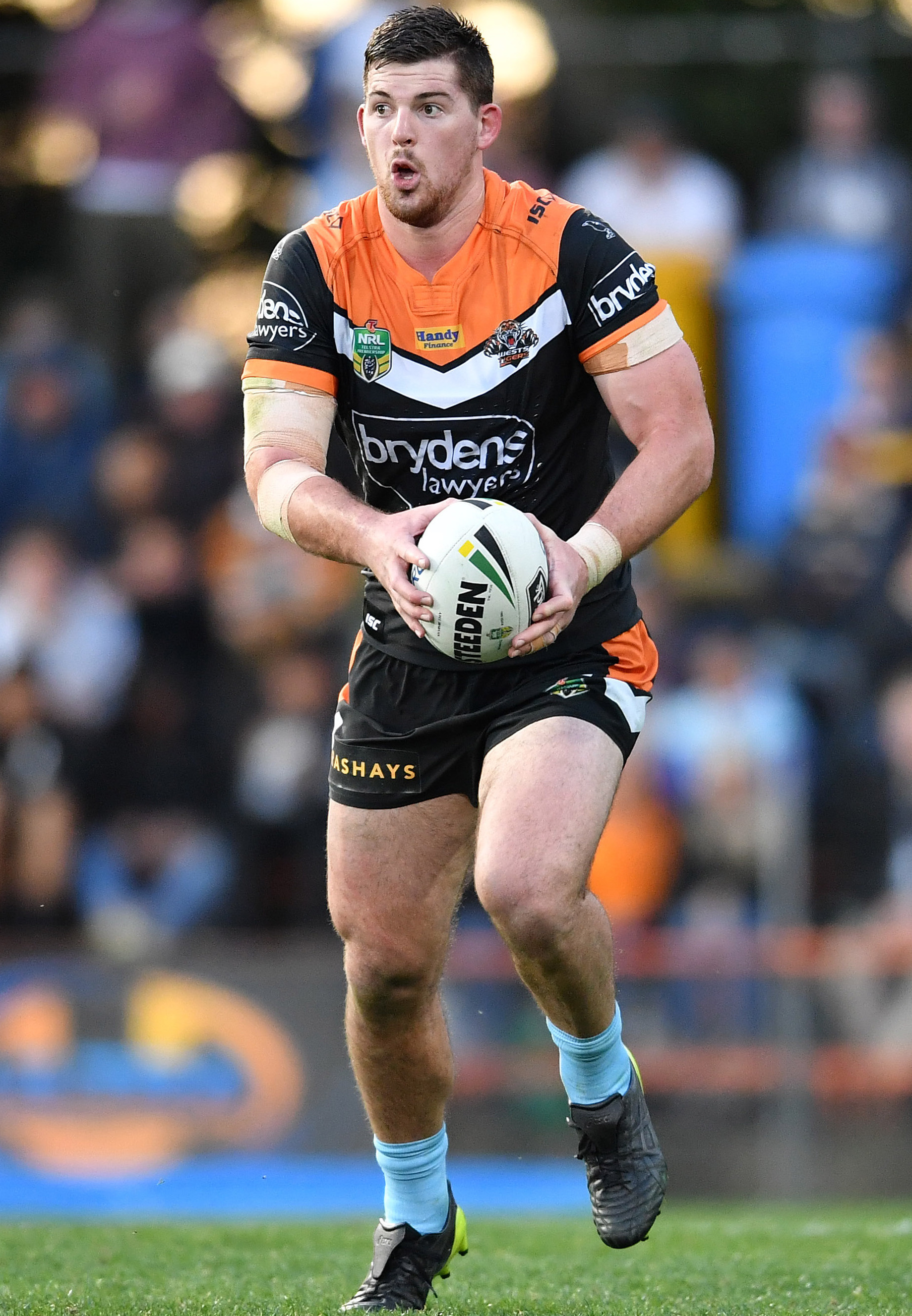

Personal information
- Full name: Matthew Eisenhuth
- Born: 20 August 1992 (age 34) Auburn, New South Wales, Australia
- Height: 197 cm (6 ft 6 in)
- Weight: 113 kg (17 st 11 lb)

Playing information
- Position: Lock, Prop
Club
Years	Team	Pld	T	G	FG	P
2017–20	Wests Tigers	70	4	0	0	16
2021–26	Penrith Panthers	75	1	0	0	4
	Total	145	5	0	0	20
Representative
Years	Team	Pld	T	G	FG	P
2025	Prime Minister's XIII	1	0	0	0	0
- Source: As of 12 October 2025
- Relatives: Tom Eisenhuth (cousin); Paul Gallen (cousin)

Matt Eisenhuth (born 20 August 1992) is an Australian professional rugby league coach who is the head coach of the Penrith Panthers in the New South Wales Cup and a former professional rugby league footballer who played as a lock in the NRL.

He previously played for the Wests Tigers and the Penrith Panthers in the National Rugby League.

== Background ==
Eisenhuth was born in Auburn, New South Wales, Australia.

He played his junior rugby league for the Wentworthville Magpies, before being signed by the Parramatta Eels.

Eisenhuth is the cousin of Australian international and former New South Wales State of Origin captain Paul Gallen, and of current St. George Illawarra Dragons player Tom Eisenhuth.

== Playing career ==
=== Early career ===
From 2010 to 2012, Eisenhuth played for the Parramatta Eels' NYC team. In 2010, he played for the Australian Schoolboys. In 2013, he graduated to the Eels' New South Wales Cup team, Wenworthville Magpies. Midway through 2013, he joined the Penrith Panthers, after being cut by then Eels coach Ricky Stuart.

In 2014, Eisenhuth overcame fears that he might not play football again, after having a tumour found in his knee. He had the tumour cut out, with the hole filled up with bone cement. In 2016, he joined the Wests Tigers.

=== 2017 ===
In round 15, Eisenhuth made his NRL debut for the Tigers against the Cronulla-Sutherland Sharks, and played every remaining game of the season in first grade. After initially playing from the bench, he cemented a position starting at lock for the last 6 games of the year.

In August, Eisenhuth re-signed with the Tigers on a 2-year contract until the end of 2019. He said, "For me, it was a pretty easy decision to extend my time here. This club stood by me and gave me a shot nobody else was and they rewarded me with a debut and constant first-grade, so in my mind, I wasn’t looking to go anywhere else. I think I’ve been improving week in and week out, so I’m very happy to be here for the next couple of years."

=== 2018 ===
In round 4, Eisenhuth scored his first NRL try, against the Parramatta Eels in the Tigers' 30–20 win at ANZ Stadium. Midseason, he signed a further extension to remain at Wests Tigers until the end of 2020, with coach Ivan Cleary calling him, "a key member of our team".

Towards the end of the season, Eisenhuth was a described as a player who embodies, "what it means to be a tireless worker". Leading his club in tackle counts, decoy runs, and second in support plays, he was considered one of the hardest workers in the NRL. He scored 2 tries and played in all 24 of the Wests Tigers games for the season.

=== 2019 ===
Eisenhuth played 21 games for Wests in the 2019 NRL season as the club finished ninth and missed out on the finals.

=== 2020 ===
On 28 September, Eisenhuth was one of eight players who were released by the Wests Tigers. On 30 October, he signed a two-year deal with Penrith, returning to the club where he played reserve grade.

=== 2021 ===
Eisenhuth played 19 games for Penrith in the 2021 NRL season and featured in the club's qualifying final loss to South Sydney. He did not feature in the club's grand final squad in which Penrith defeated South Sydney

=== 2022 ===
Eisenhuth played 16 games for Penrith in the 2022 NRL season. On 25 September, Eisenhuth played in Penrith's NSW Cup Grand Final victory over Canterbury. On 2 October 2022, Eisenhuth played for Penrith in their NRL State Championship victory over Norths Devils.

=== 2023 ===
On 18 February, Eisenhuth played in Penrith's 13–12 upset loss to St Helens RFC in the 2023 World Club Challenge. Eisenhuth played 11 games for Penrith in the 2023 NRL season however he did not feature in the club's finals campaign or the 2023 NRL Grand Final in which Penrith defeated Brisbane.

=== 2024 ===
On 24 February, Eisenhuth played in Penrith's 2024 World Club Challenge final loss against Wigan. Eisenhuth played 20 games for Penrith in the 2024 NRL season. He was named as 18th man in Penrith's 2024 NRL Grand Final victory over Melbourne. Eisenhuth re-signed with the Penrith outfit on a two-year deal.

=== 2025 ===
Eisenhuth played 11 games for Penrith in the 2025 season. On 12 October 2025 he made his debut for the Prime Minister's XIII in the 28-10 win over PNG Prime Minister's XIII in Port Moresby

=== 2026 ===
On 19 March 2026, Eisenhuth announced his immediate retirement from the NRL.

== Statistics ==
Year	Team	Games	Tries	Pts
2017	Wests Tigers	11		
2018	Wests Tigers	24	2	8
2019	Wests Tigers	21	1	4
2020	Wests Tigers	14	1	4
2021	Penrith Panthers	19	1	4
2022	Penrith Panthers	16		
2023	Penrith Panthers	11		
2024	Penrith Panthers	18		
2025	Penrith Panthers	11		
	Totals	145	5	20
