= Max King (rugby league) =

England international rugby league footballer (born 1997)

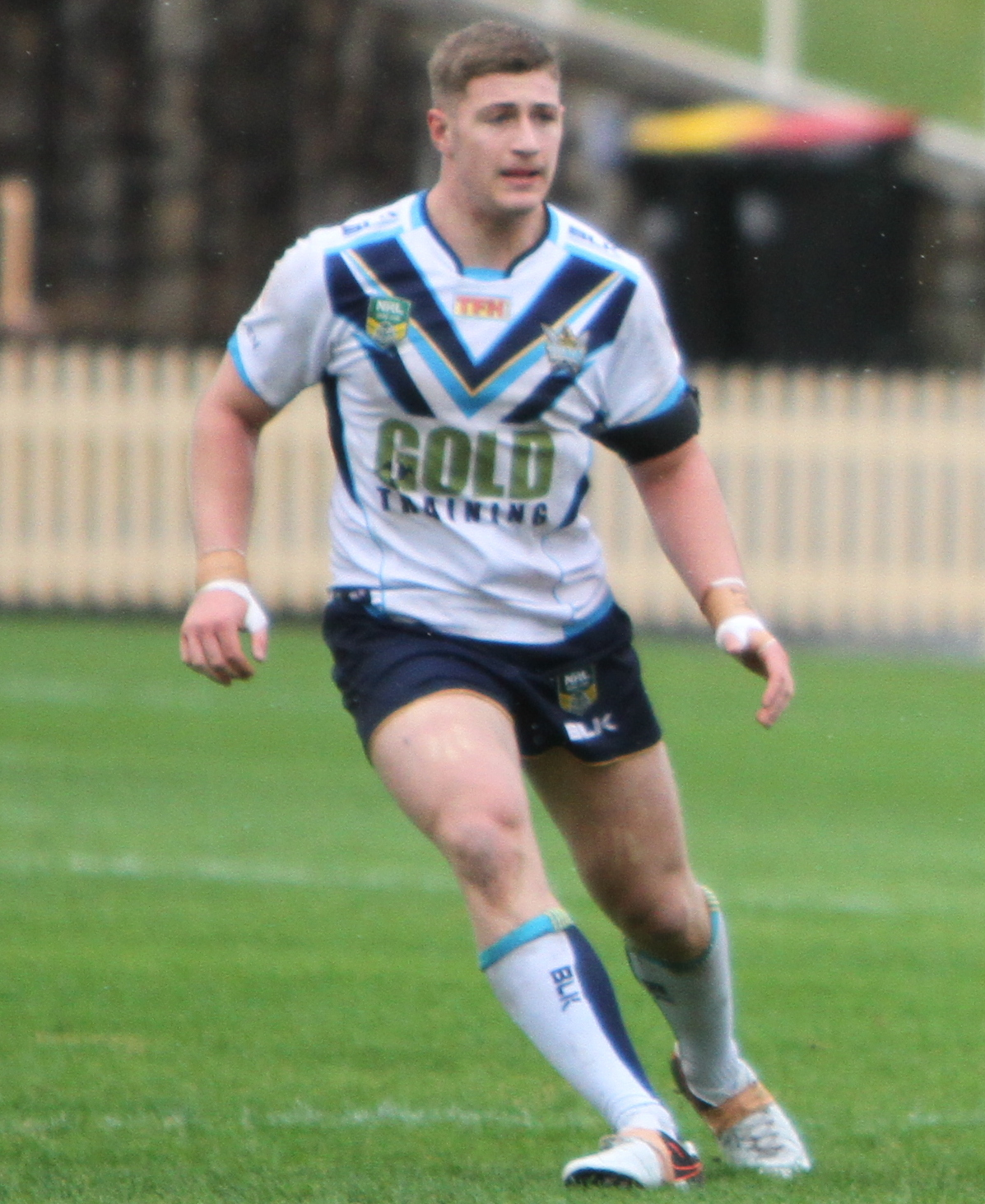

Personal information
- Full name: Maxwell David King
- Born: 4 May 1997 (age 29) Huddersfield, West Yorkshire, England (Note: As of April 2024, King's birthplace is listed as Maitland, New South Wales, Australia on NRL.com. King told the i newspaper in March 2022 that he was born in Huddersfield, England while his father David was playing for the Huddersfield Giants.)
- Height: 188 cm (6 ft 2 in)
- Weight: 105 kg (16 st 7 lb)

Playing information
- Position: Prop, Lock
Club
Years	Team	Pld	T	G	FG	P
2017–19	Gold Coast Titans	38	1	0	0	4
2019–21	Melbourne Storm	12	1	0	0	4
2022–	Canterbury Bulldogs	109	4	0	0	16
	Total	159	6	0	0	24
Representative
Years	Team	Pld	T	G	FG	P
2022	Prime Minister's XIII	1	0	0	0	0
2025	New South Wales	3	0	0	0	0
2026–	England	3	0	0	0	0
- Source: As of 6 November 2026
- Education: All Saints College, Maitland
- Relatives: Johnny King (grandfather)

Maxwell David King (born 4 May 1997) is an English professional rugby league footballer who plays as a prop and lock for the Canterbury-Bankstown Bulldogs in the NRL and England at international level.

He previously played for the Gold Coast Titans and the Melbourne Storm in the NRL.

== Background ==
King was born in Huddersfield, England to an Australian father and an English mother. His father David is a former professional rugby league player who was playing for the Huddersfield Giants at the time of King's birth. His mother is from Dewsbury.

King's great-grandfather, Cec, played for the South Sydney Rabbitohs from 1945 to 1946, his grandfather, Johnny, was a seven-time premiership winner with the St George Dragons and his father, David, played for the Gold Coast Seagulls from 1991 to 1992.

He lived in Huddersfield until aged 7 when he and his family moved to Australia. He lived in Maitland and was educated at All Saints College, Maitland. It was there where he represented NSW Combined Catholic Colleges Rugby League team.

King is a West Maitland Wallaroo junior. He was signed by North Sydney Bears' Harold Matthews Cup side in 2013 and then Newcastle Knights SG Ball Cup side in 2015, before being signed by the Gold Coast Titans.

== Playing career ==
=== Early career ===
In 2016 and 2017, King played for the Gold Coast Titans' NYC team. Max King won the Titans Holden Cup Player Of The Year award in 2016.

=== 2017 ===
In round 3 of the 2017 NRL season, King made his NRL debut for the Gold Coast Titans against the Parramatta Eels. King played a total of 17 games in his debut season as the Titans finished 15th on the table.

=== 2018 ===
In round 9 of the 2018 season, King scored his first NRL try in the Gold Coast's 18–32 loss to the Canberra Raiders at Canberra Stadium. King played 12 games for the Titans as they finished 14th on the table.

=== 2019 ===
Mid-season saw King traded to the Melbourne Storm. In round 23 of the 2019 season, King made his Melbourne Storm debut against his former club at AAMI Park. He had his Melbourne jersey (cap number 199) presented to him by former Melbourne player Jason Ryles. King finished his 2019 season playing 9 games for the Titans and 6 games for the Storm.

=== 2020 ===
In round 20 of the 2020 NRL season, King played his 50th NRL match, during the match King was placed on report for a hip drop tackle on St. George Illawarra forward Blake Lawrie. Due to the intent shown from King the tackle was referred straight to judiciary. King was later suspended for three matches by the judiciary costing himself a chance of playing in the 2020 NRL Grand Final. The tackle was described as being ugly and premeditated. King played 6 games for the Storm as they finished 2nd on the table.

=== 2021 ===
King missed the entire 2021 NRL season following complications from off-season Achilles tendon surgery. On October 1, it was announced he had signed a one-year deal to join the Canterbury-Bankstown Bulldogs for the 2022 NRL season.

=== 2022 ===
After playing off the interchange bench in the opening seven games of the 2022 season, King made his Canterbury run-on debut in their round 8 match against the West Tigers at Leichhardt Oval. Under interim coach Mick Potter he has consolidated himself in the starting 13, both in the back row and at prop. King played a total of 24 matches for Canterbury in the 2022 NRL season as the club finished 12th on the table.

=== 2023 ===
King played a total of 23 games for Canterbury in the 2023 NRL season as the club finished 15th on the table.

=== 2024 ===
In round 3 of the 2024 NRL Season, King played his 100th NRL match against the Titans at Belmore Sports Ground. King played 21 games for Canterbury in the 2024 NRL season as the club qualified for the finals finishing 6th on the table. King played in their elimination finals loss against Manly.

=== 2025 ===
In round 7 of the 2025 NRL season, King broke the competition's longest try-scoring drought of an active player against the South Sydney Rabbitohs on Good Friday, scoring a try in Canterbury's 32-0 win. In May, King was selected by New South Wales ahead of the 2025 State of Origin series. King played in all three games of the 2025 State of Origin series as New South Wales lost 2-1. King was criticised by pundits for his performances in game two and three of the series. King played 23 games for Canterbury in the 2025 NRL season as the club finished fourth and qualified for the finals. Canterbury would be eliminated from the finals in straight sets.

=== 2026 ===
King featured in 20 matches for Canterbury in the 2026 NRL season as the club finished 12th on the table.

He made his England international début in the 2026 Rugby League World Cup 12-30 defeat to Tonga on 17 October 2026

== Personal life ==
King has been described as "deeply religious". He said "My No.1 thing is my bible. I read it every morning, so that is the No.1 thing I pack". King's wife said of his Origin selection, "No one would have predicted he was going to play and be chosen, but God".

== Statistics ==
Year	Team	Games	Tries	Pts
2017	Gold Coast Titans	17		
2018	Gold Coast Titans	12	1	4
2019	Gold Coast Titans	9		
2019	Melbourne Storm	6	1	4
2020	Melbourne Storm	6		
2022	Canterbury-Bankstown Bulldogs	24		
2023	Canterbury-Bankstown Bulldogs	23		
2024	Canterbury-Bankstown Bulldogs	19		
2025	Canterbury-Bankstown Bulldogs	23	2	8
2026	Canterbury-Bankstown Bulldogs	12	1	4
2027	Canterbury-Bankstown Bulldogs			
	Totals	151	5	20
