= Javon Andrews =

Australian rugby league footballer (born 2006)

Personal information
- Born: 24 December 2006 (age 19) Brisbane, Queensland, Australia
- Height: 190 cm (6 ft 3 in)
- Weight: 98 kg (15 st 6 lb)

Playing information
- Position: Five-eighth, Halfback
Club
Years	Team	Pld	T	G	FG	P
2026–	Wests Tigers	1	0	0	0	0
- Source: RLP

Javon Andrews (born 24 December 2006) is an Australian rugby league footballer for the Wests Tigers in the National Rugby League (NRL).

Andrews was born in Brisbane and educated at Marsden State High School.

A five-eighth and halfback, Andrews came through the juniors with Souths Acacia Ridge and Logan Brothers. He suffered a broken neck while playing with Brothers in 2021 when he was tackled into the goalpost, with his head passing through a gap in the padding to make direct contact with a post. His C4 and C5 vertebrae were both fractured and he was nearly left a quadriplegic. He remained out of rugby league for two-and-a-half years, before returning in 2023 and joining the Gold Coast Titans.

Andrews was named "Man of the Match" playing five-eighth for Queensland under-19s in the 2025 State of Origin. He also captained the Gold Coast Titans under-20s in the NRLQ development series that year and featured in the Queensland Cup for the Tweed Seagulls.

Prior to the 2026 season, Andrews signed a three-year deal with the Wests Tigers. He made his first-grade debut against the Canberra Raiders in round 21, having been selected over Adam Doueihi, who had a much publicised falling out with coach Benji Marshall when told he was being moved to lock-forward.
