= Nib Health Funds =

Australian health insurance fund

nib Group
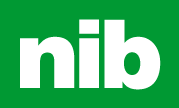
- Type: Public
- Traded as: ASX: NHF; S&P/ASX 200 component
- Industry: Insurance
- Founded: 1952
- Founder: BHP Newcastle Steelworks workers
- Headquarters: Newcastle, NSW, Australia
- Key people: David Gordon (Chairman); Ed Close (CEO and Managing Director)
- Products: Health insurance Travel insurance Life insurance
- Revenue: ▲ A$2.522 billion (2020)
- Net income: ▼A$90.1 million (2020)
- Number of employees: 1,500
- Website: www.nib.com.au

nib Group (nib, formerly Newcastle Industrial Benefits) is an Australian health care fund. It was established in 1952 to provide health insurance for workers at the BHP Newcastle Steelworks, and has since grown into a national and international operation. As of 2017, nib held an 8.3% share of the Australian private health cover market.

== History ==
nib was established in 1952 to provide health insurance for workers at the BHP Newcastle Steelworks.

In 1995, nib was involved in a landmark court case after they rejected family health cover to a homosexual couple. While most health insurers at the time were choosing to recognise same-sex relationships, there had been no official ruling on the matter. The subsequent court case, Hope & Brown vs NIB, found that nib had violated the Anti-Discrimination Act 1977, setting a legal precedent that redefined 'family' to include same-sex couples and their children for the purposes of health insurance. nib appealed the ruling, but their application was dismissed by the Supreme Court of New South Wales.

=== Privatisation ===
In 2007, eligible policyholders and company members voted in favour of demutualisation of the health fund. The Federal Court of Australia approved the demutualisation on 5 November 2007. Later that day, nib became the first private health insurance fund to list on the Australian Securities Exchange (ASX).

=== Diversification and expansion ===
In 2010, nib expanded globally by acquiring IMAN International Pty Ltd, a provider of health cover for temporary migrant workers in Australia, for approximately $25 million. In 2012, it purchased New Zealand health insurer TOWER Medical Insurance, from Tower Insurance, for around NZ$102 million (A$80 million), making nib New Zealand the country's second-largest health insurer, covering about 160,000 people.

In 2013, nib launched Whitecoat Health Service Directory, a free online search and comparison platform often compared to TripAdvisor for healthcare. While popular with consumers, it has faced criticism from doctors and medical groups.

In 2014, nib entered a distribution alliance with Suncorp subsidiary Apia to sell private health insurance under the Apia brand. Later that year, nib partnered with global medical insurer AXA PPP International in launching a global health cover pilot product in New Zealand.

In 2016, nib acquired World Nomads Group, Australia's third-largest travel insurance distributor, for $95 million, rebranding it as nib Travel in 2019. The following year, it also acquired GU Health, a specialist corporate health insurer, for $155.5 million.

In 2019, nib acquired QBE's travel insurance business, QBE Travel, as part of its World Nomads Group expansion. nib also announced a partnership with Tasly, a Chinese pharmaceutical company.

== Sponsorship and ambassadors ==
nib sponsors a number of major sporting organisations in Australia and New Zealand, including the Newcastle Knights, the New South Wales rugby league team, the Auckland Blues, the Richmond Tigers Men's and Women's leagues and the Newcastle Jets W-League.

Former rugby league footballer, Paul Harragon, has been an ambassador for the company since 1991. In 2023, the company announced former sportsperson and media personality Dylan Alcott as an ambassador, as well as appointing him Chief Motivation Officer.
