= Brian To'o =

Samoa international rugby league footballer

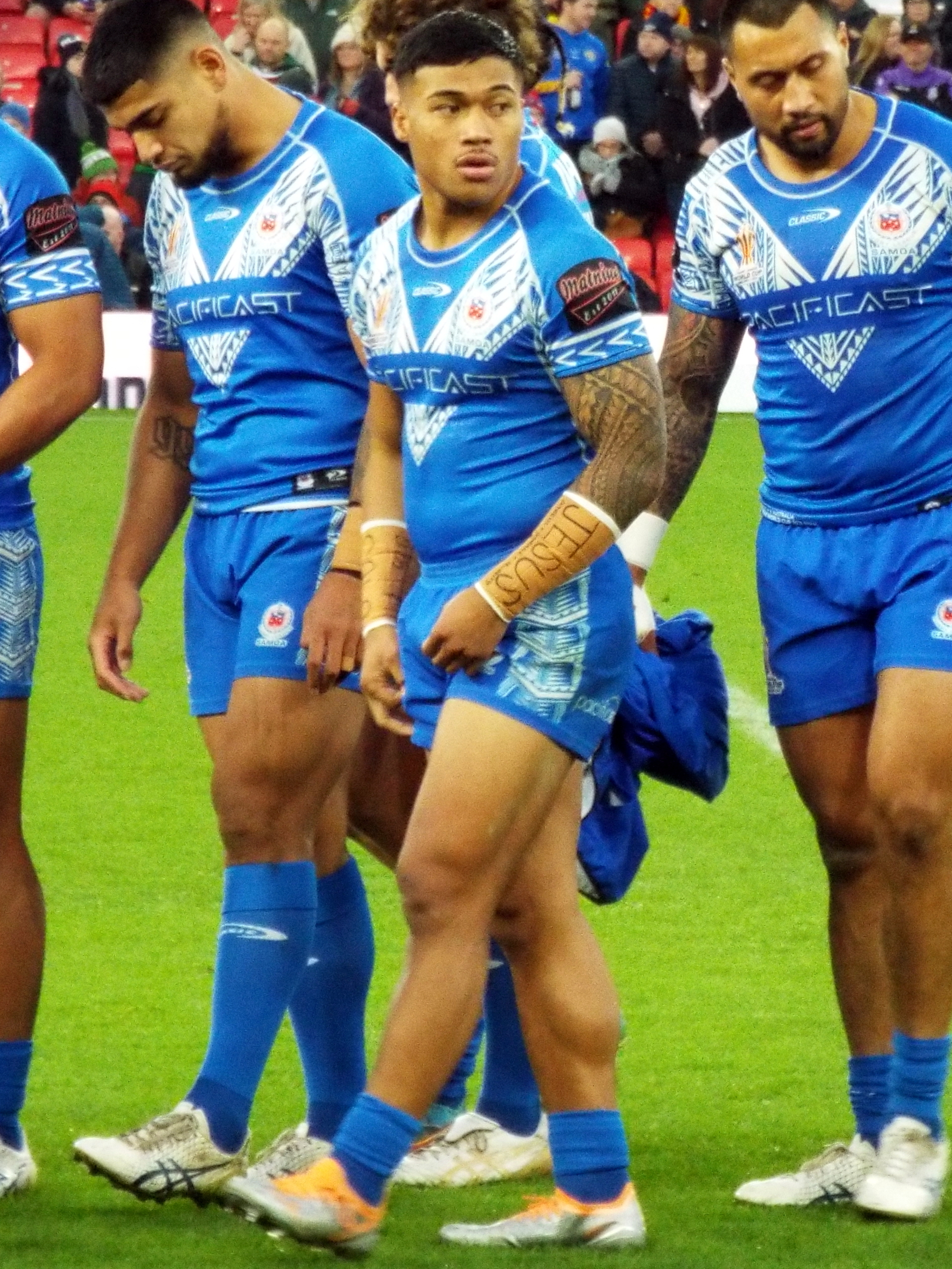

Personal information
- Full name: Brian To'o
- Born: 18 August 1998 (age 28) Westmead, New South Wales, Australia
- Height: 182 cm (6 ft 0 in) (Note: To'o's height is disputed. His height is listed as 182 cm (6 ft 0 in) by the NRL. The Sydney Morning Herald reported in 2019 that To'o is 174 cm (5 ft 9 in) tall.)
- Weight: 97 kg (15 st 4 lb)

Playing information
- Position: Wing
Club
Years	Team	Pld	T	G	FG	P
2019–	Penrith Panthers	157	104	0	0	416
Representative
Years	Team	Pld	T	G	FG	P
2019–	Samoa	15	9	0	0	36
2021–26	New South Wales	17	11	0	0	44
- Source: As of 18 November 2026

Brian To'o (born 18 August 1998) is a Samoa international rugby league footballer who plays as a winger for the Penrith Panthers in the National Rugby League and New South Wales in the State of Origin series.

He won the 2021, 2022, 2023 and 2024 NRL Grand Finals with the Penrith club. He has represented the NSW Blues in State of Origin and Samoa at Test and 9's level. Known for his strength, he is regarded as one of the best wingers in the NRL.

== Background ==
To'o was born in Sydney. Australia. His parents are of Samoan descent. To'o also has Chinese ancestry.

To’o grew up in the Sydney suburb of Whalan and was educated at Madang Avenue Public School and Rooty Hill High School. He played his junior rugby league for St Marys Saints.

== Career ==
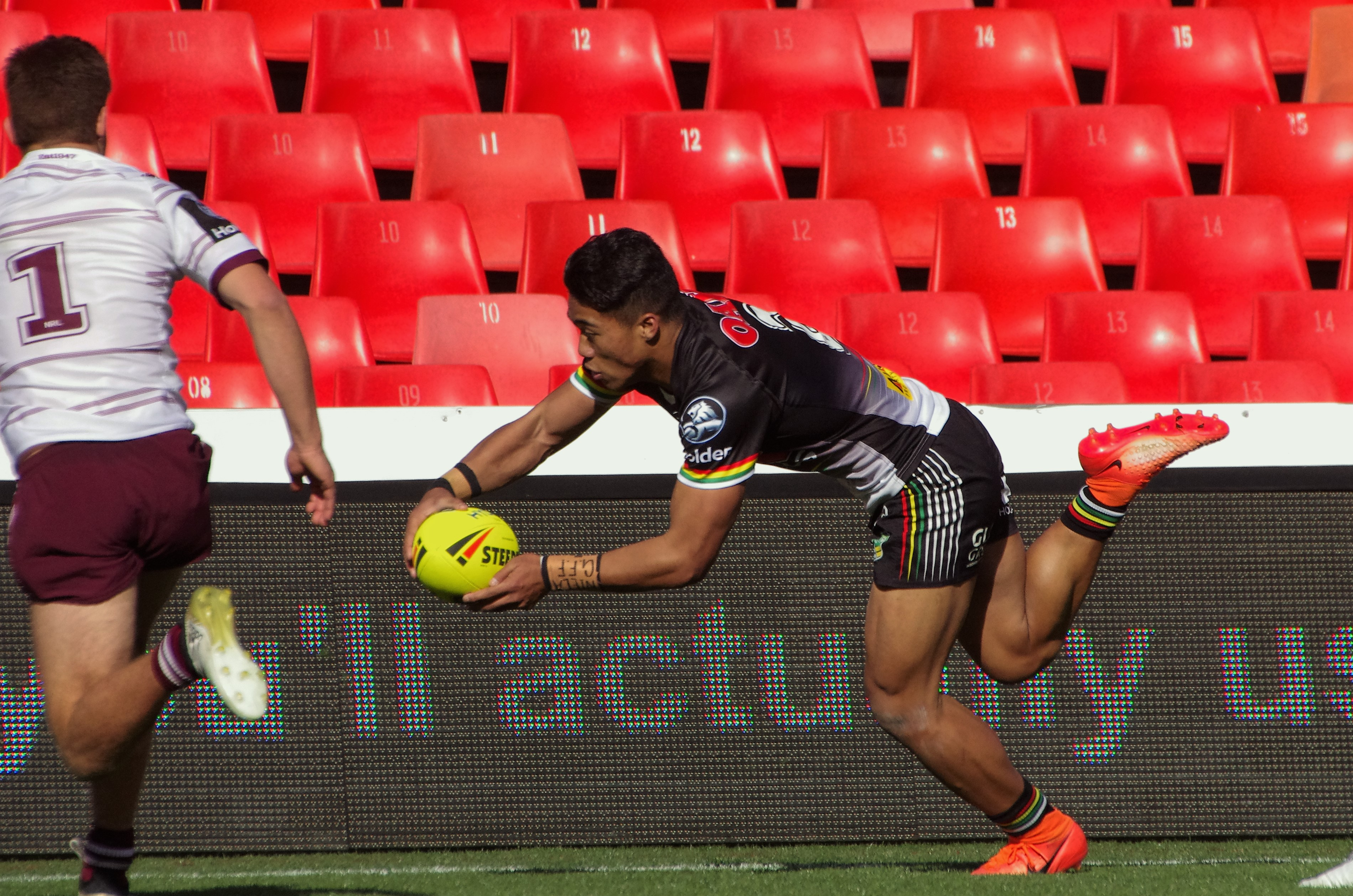
To'o playing for the Panthers in 2017

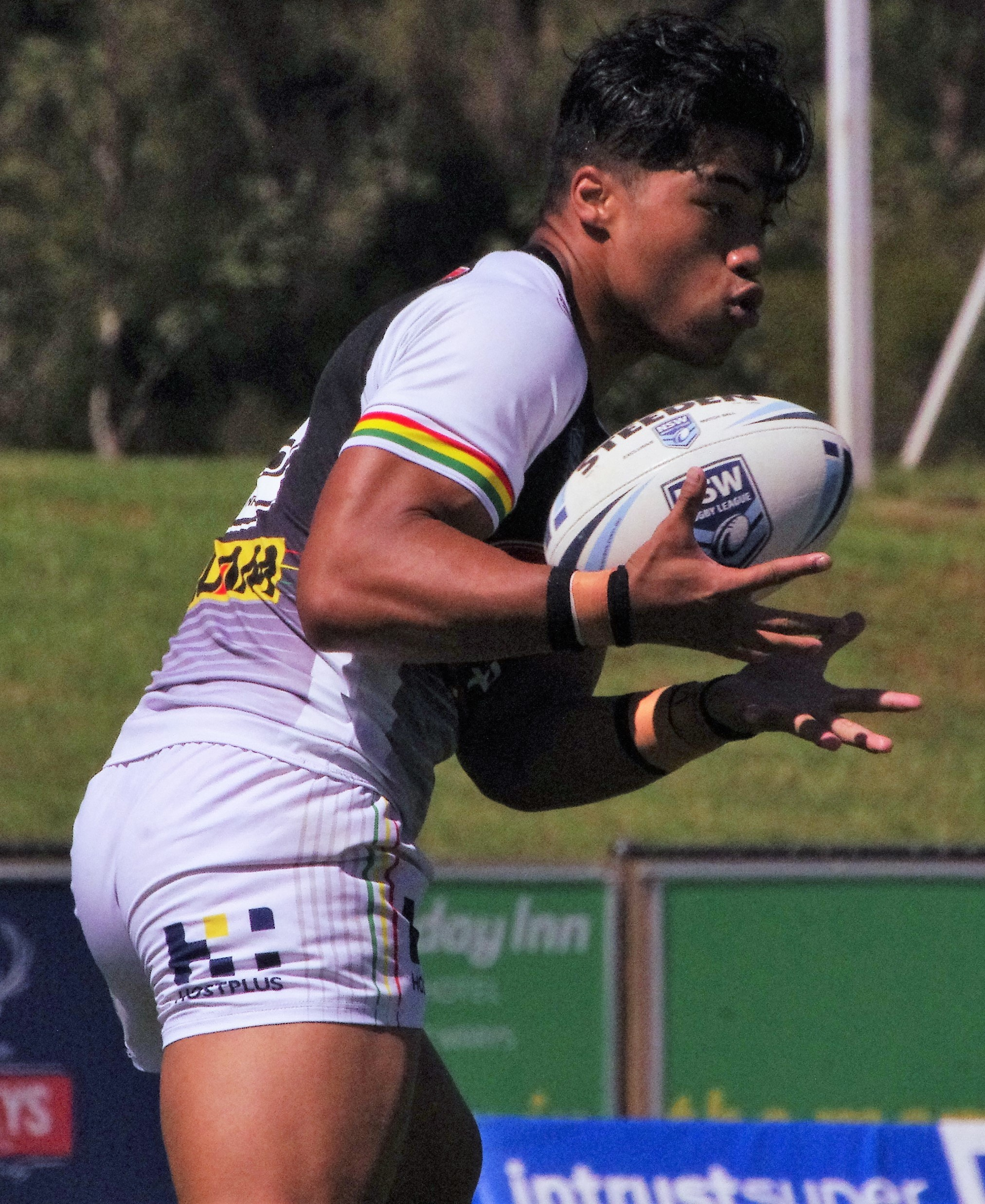
To'o playing for Penrith in 2018

=== 2019 ===
To'o made his NRL debut in round 10 of the 2019 NRL season for Penrith against the New Zealand Warriors.

To'o scored his first try in the top grade in Round 14 of the 2019 NRL season against South Sydney at ANZ Stadium in a 19–18 victory.

To'o made a total of 15 appearances for Penrith in the 2019 NRL season as the club finished tenth on the table and missed out on the finals for the first time since 2015.

=== 2020 ===
In round 8 of the 2020 NRL season, To'o was taken from the field during Penrith's 19–12 victory over Wests Tigers at Bankwest Stadium. It was later revealed To'o would be ruled out for two months with a grade-three syndesmosis injury.

He played a total of 16 games for Penrith in the 2020 NRL season as the club claimed the Minor Premiership and reached the 2020 NRL Grand Final. To'o played in the grand final and scored a second half try in Penrith's 26–20 loss against Melbourne.

=== 2021 ===
On 30 May, he was selected by New South Wales for game one of the 2021 State of Origin series. At the time of his selection, To’o lead the league in both run metres and post-contact metres for players in any position. He scored two tries in the opening game of the series as New South Wales defeated Queensland 50–6.

In round 15, To'o scored two tries for Penrith in a 38–12 victory over the Sydney Roosters.

On 27 July, To'o was ruled out for at least six weeks after suffering a syndesmosis injury in Penrith's victory over Brisbane.

In round 25, To'o scored a hat-trick in Penrith's 40–6 victory over Parramatta. On 27 September, To'o was named Dally M Winger of the year alongside Manly's Reuben Garrick.

To'o played a total of 21 games for Penrith in the 2021 NRL season including the club's 2021 NRL Grand Final victory over South Sydney.

=== 2022 ===
In round 2 of the 2022 NRL season, To'o was taken from the field during Penrith's victory over St. George Illawarra. It was later announced that To'o would miss six to eight matches with a knee injury.

To'o made his return to the Penrith side in round 9 against Parramatta which ended in a 22–20 defeat.

On 29 May, To'o was selected by New South Wales to play in game one of the 2022 State of Origin series.

In the 2022 Qualifying Final, To'o scored two tries in Penrith's 27–8 victory over Parramatta.

To'o played in Penrith's 2022 NRL Grand Final victory over Parramatta scoring two tries as Penrith finished 28–12 winners.

In October he was named in the Samoa squad for the 2021 Rugby League World Cup.

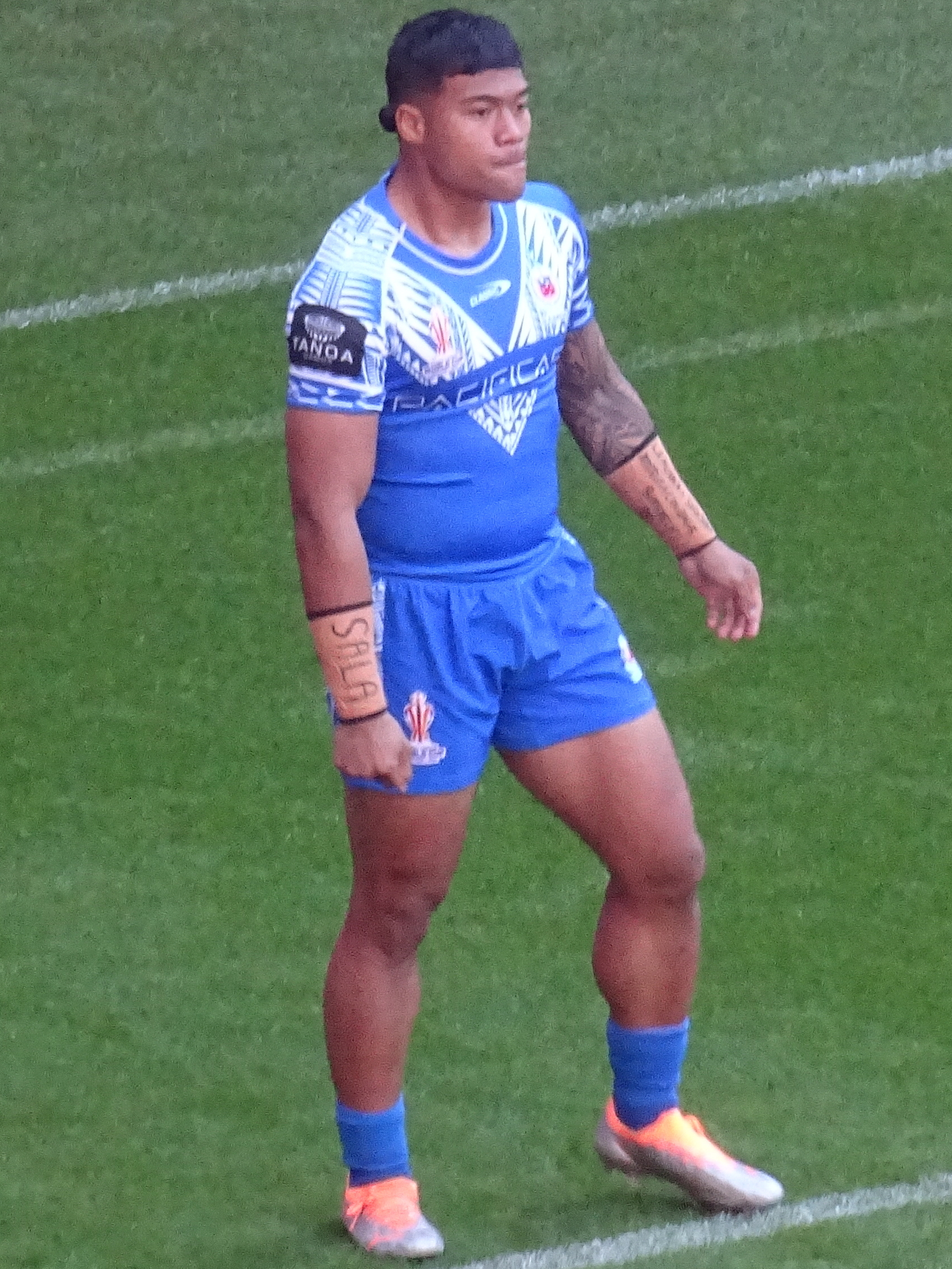
To'o playing for Samoa in 2022

To'o played in every game for Samoa at the 2021 Rugby League World Cup including the final against Australia. To'o scored a second half try as Samoa lost 30–10.

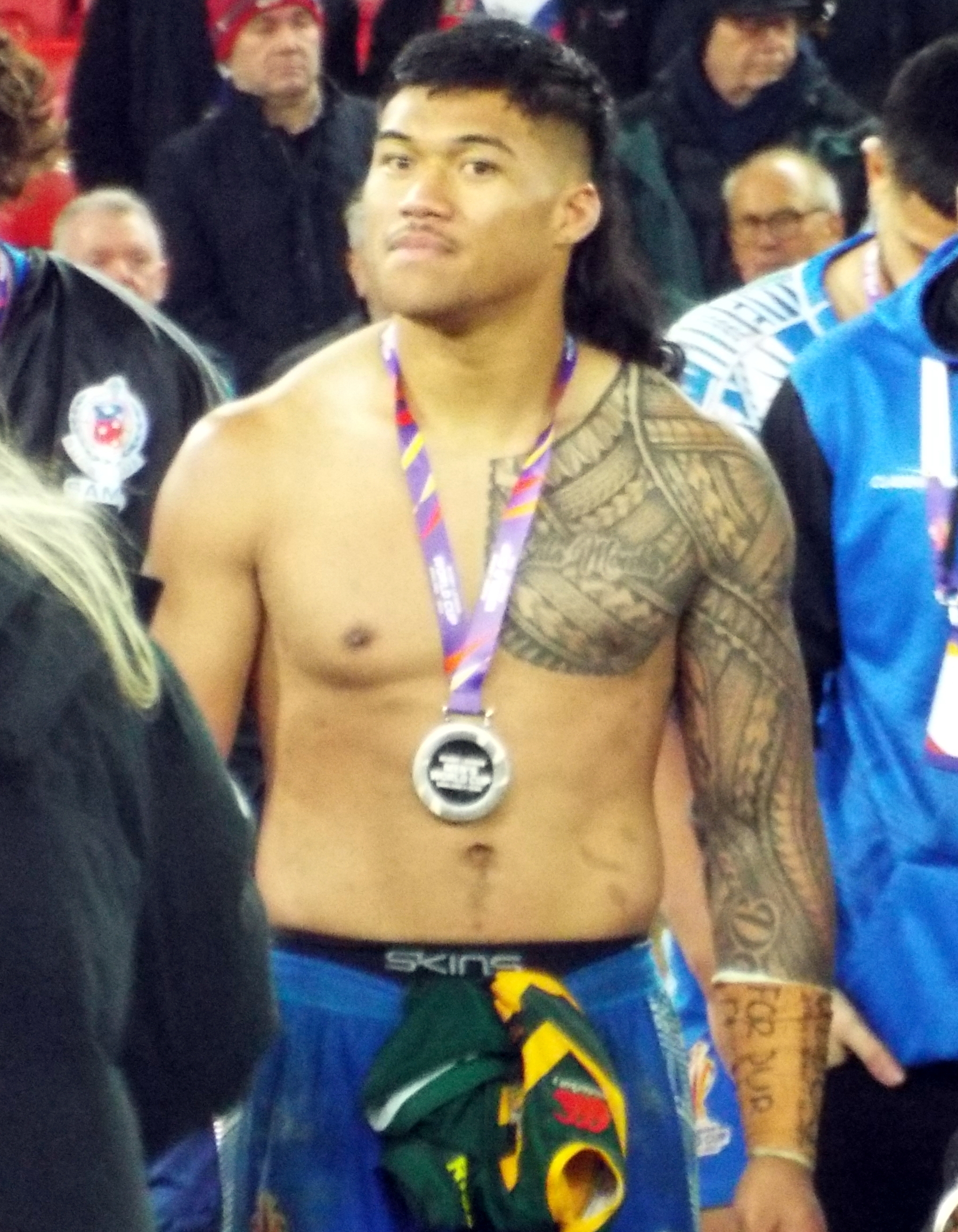
To'o post 2021 RLWC Final

In November he was named in the 2021 RLWC Team of the Tournament.

=== 2023 ===
On 22 May, To'o was selected by New South Wales for game one of the 2023 State of Origin series.

In the 2023 preliminary final, To'o scored a hat-trick in Penrith's dominant 38–4 victory over Melbourne.

To'o made 23 appearances for Penrith in the 2023 NRL season including the clubs 26–24 victory over Brisbane in the 2023 NRL Grand Final as Penrith won their third straight premiership.

=== 2024 ===
On 24 February, To'o played in Penrith's 2024 World Club Challenge final loss against Wigan. Following the match, To'o took a swipe at the referee involved in the game and Wigan player Jake Wardle saying "You can’t change much. The result is made, but he already knows he didn’t get it over the line, I’m sure the ref knows as well. Lying is a sin, as well. I already knew he didn’t get it down and when they awarded it, you’ve just got to move on. It is what it is. I’m happy for them. They can enjoy the win, and they deserve it, I guess". In round 3 of the 2024 NRL season, To'o scored two tries for Penrith in their grand final rematch against Brisbane. Penrith would win the game 34-12. On 26 May, To'o was named for New South Wales ahead of the 2024 State of Origin series. In round 14, To'o scored a hat-trick in Penrith's 32-22 over Manly. In game two of the 2024 State of Origin series, To'o scored two tries for New South Wales in their 38-18 victory over Queensland. In round 23, To'o scored two tries for Penrith in their 36-34 comeback victory over Parramatta. To'o played a total of 24 matches for Penrith in the 2024 NRL season including their 14-6 grand final victory over Melbourne.

=== 2025 ===
In May, To'o was selected for New South Wales for the 2025 State of Origin series. In game two of the series, he scored a hat-trick in New South Wales narrow 26-24 loss against Queensland. To'o was retained for game three where New South Wales would lose 24-12 and the series 2-1. On 23 September, it was revealed that To'o had found himself in trouble with Penrith's hierarchy after making several inappropriate comments about players partners on social media following the clubs awards night. Penrith officials reportedly addressed the matter with To’o after he became the subject of several articles, but no action was taken. To'o played 16 games for Penrith in the 2025 NRL season as the club finished 7th on the table. He played in Penrith's narrow preliminary final loss against Brisbane.

=== 2026 ===
In May, To'o was selected by New South Wales for game one in the 2026 State of Origin series. To'o played for New South Wales in game two of the series in which the blues suffered a heavy defeat to Queensland. Ahead of game three, To'o was controversially not selected by head coach Laurie Daley which sparked outrage on social media. New South Wales would go on to win game three 30-12 and the series 2-1. On 10 August 2026, Penrith announced that To'o would depart the club at the end of the 2027 season to take up a three-year deal with the PNG Chiefs in 2028. In round 25 of the 2026 NRL season, he scored a hat-trick in Penrith's victory over Melbourne.

== Statistics ==
Year	Team	Games	Tries	Pts	Wins	Draws	Losses
2019	Penrith Panthers	15	9	36	9	0	6
2020	Penrith Panthers	16	8	32	13	1	2
2021	Penrith Panthers	21	15	60	20	0	1
2022	Penrith Panthers	18	13	52	15	0	3
2023	Penrith Panthers	23	21	84	18	0	5
2024	Penrith Panthers	24	14	56	19	0	5
2025	Penrith Panthers	16	8	32	0	0	1
2026	Penrith Panthers	10	6	24			
2027	Penrith Panthers						
	Totals	143	94	376	94	1	23

== Honours ==
Individual

- Dally M Winger of The Year: 2021, 2024

Club

- 2020 Minor Premiership Winners
- 2021 NRL Grand Final Winners
- 2022 Minor Premiership Winners
- 2022 NRL Grand Final Winner
- 2023 Minor Premiership Winners
- 2023 NRL Grand Final Winner
- 2024 NRL Grand Final Winner

Representative

- 2021 State of Origin series Winners
- 2024 State of Origin series Winners

== Personal life ==
To’o proposed to Moesha Crichton-Ropati at Suncorp Stadium amid the immediate post-match celebrations by the Penrith team of their grand final victory on 3 October 2021. The couple got married in December 2022 and had their first child, a boy, in late October 2023.
