= Whitecoat Health Service Directory =

Online directory of healthcare professionals

Whitecoat Health Service Directory, commonly referred to as Whitecoat, is an online directory of healthcare professionals. It was launched in Australia in 2013 and New Zealand in 2018. The service allows consumers to rate their experience of a healthcare provider and read other users’ recommendations and reviews. By 2016, Whitecoat was the largest website of its kind in Australia. Whitecoat has drawn significant criticism from professional medical bodies.

== Overview ==
Whitecoat provides contact details and ratings information for more than 210,000 Australian healthcare providers across 120 different provider types, including dentists, optometrists, and physiotherapists. Along with providing publicly available contact details for different healthcare providers, the Whitecoat website carries ratings information regarding availability, listening skills, explanation of treatment and likelihood to recommend as well as comments from customers about their overall service experience. The site has been likened to being the Trip Advisor of the healthcare sector.

== History ==
Whitecoat was launched by NIB Health Funds. In 2016, Bupa and HBF signed a heads of agreement to join nib as investors and participants in expanding the Whitecoat healthcare provider platform, increase its reach to approximately six million Australians. Also in 2016, Whitecoat announced its plans to provide consumers with cost transparency of medical procedures on its website, as a result of 2014-15 NIB claims data that revealed significant fee variations paid to medical specialists, which left consumers with out-of-pocket costs. At the same time, Whitecoat announced it would also allow consumers to book and pay for treatment through the Whitecoat platform and apps.

As of 2018, Whitecoat has 65,000 health care providers listed on its website, including 16,000 Specialists and 11,000 General Practitioners, and had between 4 and 5 million visitors per year and 575,000 moderated reviews from patients. As of 2020, Whitecoat has 450,000 visitors per month, 120 modalities between GP, allied and specialists, 325,000 providers listed, 1.2 million Australian Health Practitioner Regulation Agency moderated reviews.

In 2020, during the COVID-19 pandemic, Whitecoat launched a Telehealth service to connect patients and telehealth providers in both Australia and New Zealand. Later that year Whitecoat launched native mobile apps, Whitecoat Pro for providers to process Medicare, Allied and Scheme payments and claims, and MyWhitecoat for consumers to approve payments and claims and manage their healthcare.

== Criticism ==
Whitecoat's launch was met with significant criticism from medical professionals and bodies. President of the Australian Medical Association (AMA) Steve Hambleton expressed concern the website would give undue criticism to medical professionals who choose to see higher-risk patients, and accordingly have higher rates of adverse outcomes. In 2016, the AMA expressed concerns surgeons would avoid operating on such high-risk patients if the complications rates were published. Australian Dental Association vice president Carmelo Bonanno said the website reviews failed to adequately represent the entire patient's experience with a healthcare provider, describing the service as "a cheap marketing exercise and nothing more.”

In 2018, Whitecoat launched in New Zealand. Association of Salaried Medical Specialists president Ian Powell subsequently expressed fears for the safety of medical professionals, saying "What happens if a doctor initiates child protection proceedings because they are concerned about a child's well-being, and one of the parents involved subsequently rates the doctor poorly or posts negative comments? There are circumstances in which comments posted on the website could post an actual danger to the doctor's safety, for example when doctors perform abortions or carry out other treatment or procedures that some individuals or groups find contentious."
