= Tom Eisenhuth =

Australian rugby league footballer

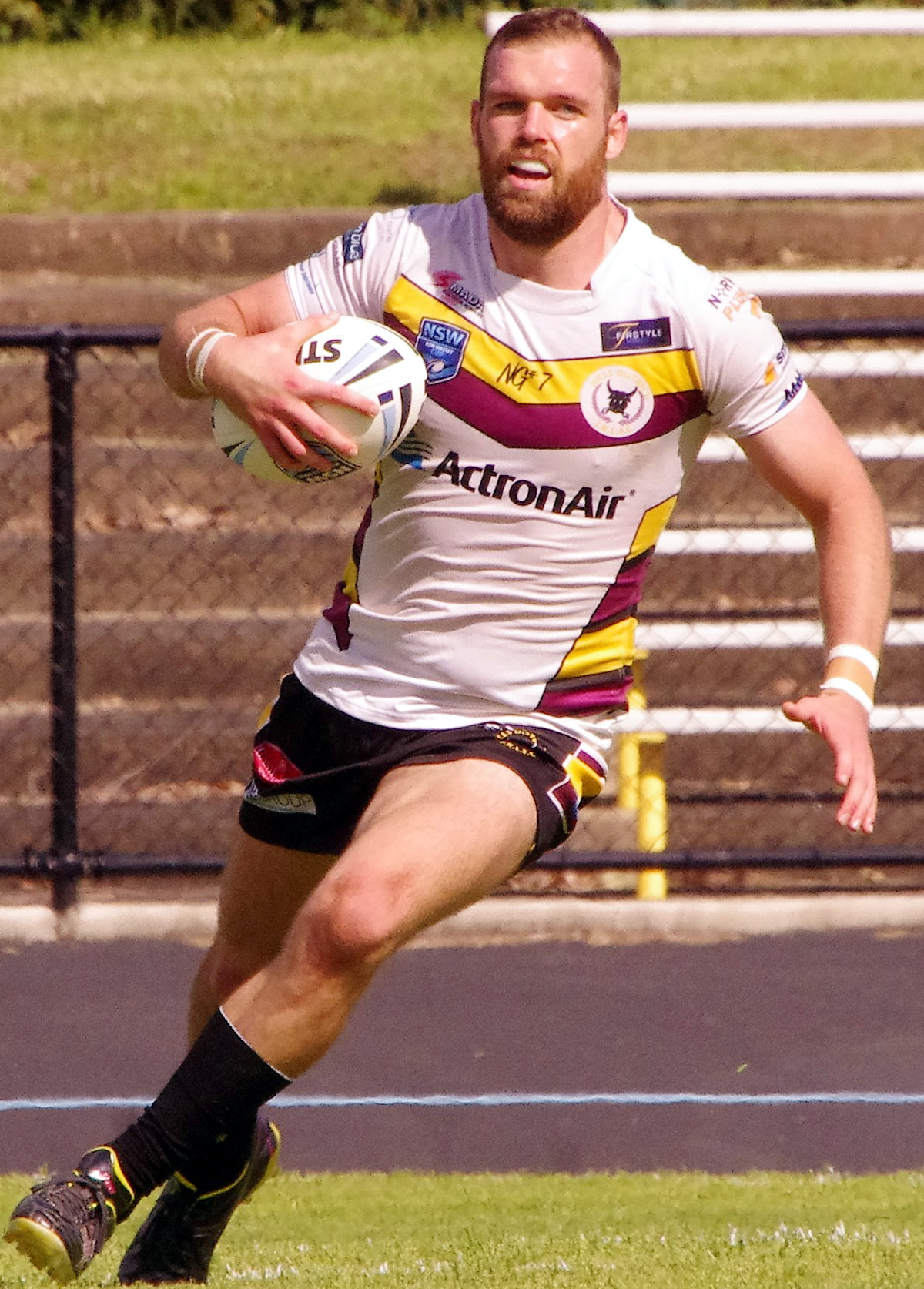

Personal information
- Full name: Thomas Eisenhuth
- Born: 17 July 1992 (age 34) Blue Mountains, New South Wales, Australia

Playing information
- Height: 192 cm (6 ft 4 in)
- Weight: 100 kg (15 st 10 lb)
- Position: Second-row, Lock
Club
Years	Team	Pld	T	G	FG	P
2012	Penrith Panthers	1	0	0	0	0
2019–23	Melbourne Storm	58	5	0	0	20
2024	St. George Illawarra	24	2	0	0	8
	Total	83	7	0	0	28
- Education: St Columba's College, Springwood
- Relatives: Matt Eisenhuth (cousin); Paul Gallen (cousin)

Tom Eisenhuth (born 17 July 1992) is an Australian former professional rugby league footballer who played as a lock and second-row forward for the Melbourne Storm and St George Illawarra Dragons in the National Rugby League (NRL).

He debuted as a centre for the Penrith Panthers in the NRL.

== Early life ==
Eisenhuth was born in the Blue Mountains, New South Wales and was educated at St Columba's College, Springwood.

He played his junior football for the Lower Mountains Eagles before being signed by the Penrith Panthers. He played for the Panthers' NYC team from 2010 to 2012, scoring 8 tries in 47 games.

Eisenhuth is the cousin of fellow NRL player Matt Eisenhuth and retired Cronulla Sharks Captain Paul Gallen.

== Playing career ==
=== Penrith Panthers ===
In round 24 of the 2012 NRL season, Eisenhuth made his NRL debut for the Panthers in their 18–16 win over the New Zealand Warriors at Mt Smart Stadium. Eisenhuth had travelled to Auckland as a member of the Panthers NRL Under-20s squad, but was called the NRL squad on the morning of the match.

In 2013, Eisenhuth moved into Penrith's NSW Cup side, the Windsor Wolves. Between 2014 and 2018, Eisenhuth played 44 matches for Penrith's self-named NSW Cup team, scoring 18 tries. In 2016, Eisenhuth played for the St Marys Saints in their Ron Massey Cup Grand Final loss. On 26 June 2018, Eisenhuth was released from his contract with Penrith effective immediately. He then signed with the Melbourne Storm for the remainder of the 2018 season, joining Storm affiliate club the Sunshine Coast Falcons.

=== Melbourne Storm ===
In round 1 of the 2019 NRL season, Eisenhuth made his Melbourne Storm debut against the Brisbane Broncos at AAMI Park. He had his Melbourne jersey (cap number 192) presented to him by former Melbourne player Ryan Hoffman. It marked Eisenhuth's second NRL appearance, his first in 2,398 days.

Eisenhuth played a total of 17 games for Melbourne in the 2021 NRL season as the club won 19 matches in a row and claimed the Minor Premiership. Eisenhuth did not play in the club's finals series where Melbourne suffered a 10–6 loss against eventual premiers Penrith in the preliminary final.

In 2022, Eisenhuth was named in the NRL and Rugby League Players Association academic team of the year. A qualified schoolteacher, Eisenhuth balanced his rugby league commitments with completing a Masters of Education through the Australian Catholic University.

Eisenhuth would make 18 appearances for the Melbourne outfit in the 2023 NRL season, the most in a single season for his career. Following the end of the season, Melbourne announced that Eisenhuth would be leaving the club.

=== St. George Illawarra ===
Eisenhuth played every game for St. George Illawarra in the 2024 NRL season as the club finished 11th on the table. Eisenhuth re-signed with the club for 2025. Eisenhuth was granted extended leave from St. George Illawarra after suffering a concussion in pre-season and in a match in NSW Cup. On 23 May 2025, it was announced that Eisenhuth had retired from the NRL due to ongoing concussion concerns. Hours later, St. George officially confirmed his retirement and had confirmed that Eisenhuth will stay at the club in an off field role.

== Representative career ==
On 2 October 2012, Eisenhuth was named on the bench in the Junior Kangaroos team to face the Junior Kiwis.
