= Classic Sportswear =

Australian sports clothing manufacturer

- Company type: Privately held
- Industry: Sports clothing manufacturer
- Founded: 1934; 92 years ago
- Headquarters: Sydney, Australia
- Area served: Oceania
- Products: Accessories, apparel, sportswear
- Website: Official website

Classic Sportswear, also simply known as Classic, is an Australian sports clothing manufacturer. The company was founded in Sydney in 1934, making them one of the oldest family owned sports clothing companies in Australia. Classic Sportswear manufactures clothing for Australian rules football, basketball, cricket, rugby league, rugby union and soccer.

The company notably supplies all five New Zealand Super Rugby teams: the Highlanders, Blues, Chiefs, Hurricanes and Crusaders (replacing Adidas).

== See also ==
- List of fitness wear brands
