= Andrew Hope III =

Andrew Hope III (December 23, 1949 – August 7, 2008) was a Tlingit Native rights activist and educator. He was born and died in Sitka, Alaska. He was a co-founder of the Tlingit Clan Conference.

== Published works ==
- Lingit At.oowoo
- Raven's Bones
- Will the Time Ever Come?
