= Toby Rodwell =

Australian rugby league footballer (born 2006)

Personal information
- Born: 27 February 2006 (age 20) Wollongong, New South Wales, Australia
- Height: 181 cm (5 ft 11 in)
- Weight: 84 kg (13 st 3 lb)

Playing information
- Position: Halfback, Five-eighth
Club
Years	Team	Pld	T	G	FG	P
2026–	Sydney Roosters	2	1	2	0	8
- Source: RLP

Toby Rodwell (born 27 February 2006) is an Australian rugby league footballer for the Sydney Roosters in the National Rugby League (NRL).

== Early life ==
Born in Wollongong, Rodwell is a son of former NSW State of Origin player Brett Rodwell and a younger brother of Roosters winger Tom Rodwell. He was educated at Newington College in Sydney.

== Career ==
Rodwell, a Collegians JRLFC product, was signed by the Sydney Roosters aged 15. A former Australian Schoolboys representative, Rodwell won the Roosters' Harry Phipps Rising Star award in 2024 and the following year was a member of their SG Ball Cup premiership-winning team.

In the 2026 NRL season, Rodwell made his first-grade debut off the bench against the Dolphins in round 15 and scored a try, before getting his first start as halfback for their final home and away fixture against South Sydney.
