= Jordan Uta =

New Zealand-born rugby league footballer (born 2006)

Personal information
- Born: 8 January 2006 (age 20)

Playing information
- Position: Second-row
Club
Years	Team	Pld	T	G	FG	P
2026–	Canberra Raiders	1	0	0	0	0
- Source: RLP

Jordan Uta (born 8 January 2006) is a New Zealand-born rugby league footballer for the Canberra Raiders in the National Rugby League (NRL).

Uta moved to Australia as a child in 2015, living initially in Wollongong, where Uta got his start in rugby league with the Dapto Canaries. His family later moved to Sydney and he attended Hills Sports High School. He played his junior rugby league in Sydney for the Wentworthville Magpies.

A back-rower, Uta played for the Parramatta Eels in the Harold Matthews Cup and joined the Canberra Raiders once he finished school. He was a NSW under-19s State of Origin representative player in 2025. In Canberra's round 12 match against the Dolphins in 2026, Uta made his first-grade debut coming on off the bench. He signed a two-year contract extension with Canberra at the end of the season.
