= Hope & Brown v NIB Health Funds =

Legal proceeding

Hope & Brown v NIB Health Funds was a landmark case heard by the NSW Equal Opportunity Tribunal in 1995 redefining the definition of ‘family’ to include homosexual couples and their children, for the purposes of health insurance, finding that the complainants were discriminated against because they were a same-sex couple. The decision was appealed to the NSW Supreme Court in November 1996 and the court upheld the tribunal ruling and dismissed the appeal.

The dispute occurred when Andrew Hope and William (Bill) Brown, who had been living together and had significant assets together, tried to secure family health care cover for their son. NIB refused to provide family health cover. Andrew and William brought the matter to the NSW Equal Opportunity Tribunal on the grounds they were discriminated against under the Anti-Discrimination Act 1977 NSW. The court found that they had been discriminated against; if they had not been a same-sex couple they would have been granted family health cover. NIB appealed the decision to the Supreme Court of New South Wales, Hope and Brown feared they would have to sell their house to cover legal costs. They had paid $15,000 to cover court costs and another $4,000 was raised and contributed by the gay community. The Supreme Court rejected NIB's appeal in November 1995, securing the rights of homosexual families to equal health cover.
