= New South Wales rugby league team =

Representative rugby league team for New South Wales

New South Wales Blues

Team information
- Nickname: Blues; Cockroaches (unofficial)
- Governing body: New South Wales Rugby League
- Head coach: Matt King
- Captain: Isaah Yeo
- Most caps: Brad Fittler (31)
- Top try-scorer: Josh Addo-Carr (11); Jarryd Hayne (11); Michael O’Connor (11); Brian To'o (11)
- Top point-scorer: Nathan Cleary (132)
- Home stadium: Accor Stadium (84,000)

Uniforms
First colours

Team results
- First game
- New South Wales 8–12 New Zealand (Royal Agricultural Society Ground, Sydney; 1907)
- First State of Origin game
- Queensland 20–10 New South Wales (Lang Park, Brisbane; 8 July 1980)
- Biggest win
- New South Wales 69–5 Queensland (Sydney Cricket Ground, Sydney; 4 June 1957)
- Biggest defeat
- Queensland 52–6 New South Wales (Suncorp Stadium; 8 July 2015)

The New South Wales rugby league team has represented the Australian state of New South Wales (NSW) in rugby league football since the sport's beginnings there in 1907. Also known as the Blues due to their sky blue jerseys, the team competes in the annual State of Origin series against Queensland. The team is currently coached by Matt King and captained by Isaah Yeo, and is administered by the New South Wales Rugby League (NSWRL).

Prior to 1980 when the "state of origin" selection criteria was introduced, the New South Wales team, in addition to playing annually against Queensland, played matches against foreign touring sides and occasionally toured overseas themselves. Their home stadium is Accor Stadium in Sydney, the largest stadium in the state, having been constructed for the 2000 Summer Olympics.

The NSW Blues enjoy widespread popularity across NSW and the nearby Australian Capital Territory (ACT). However, the Queensland Maroons remain the more popular side for fans from places outside NSW and Queensland.

== History ==
=== Pre-Origin era (1907–1980) ===
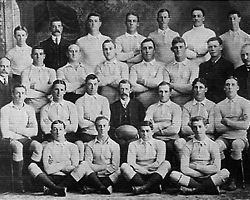
The inaugural 'All Blues' squad of 1907.

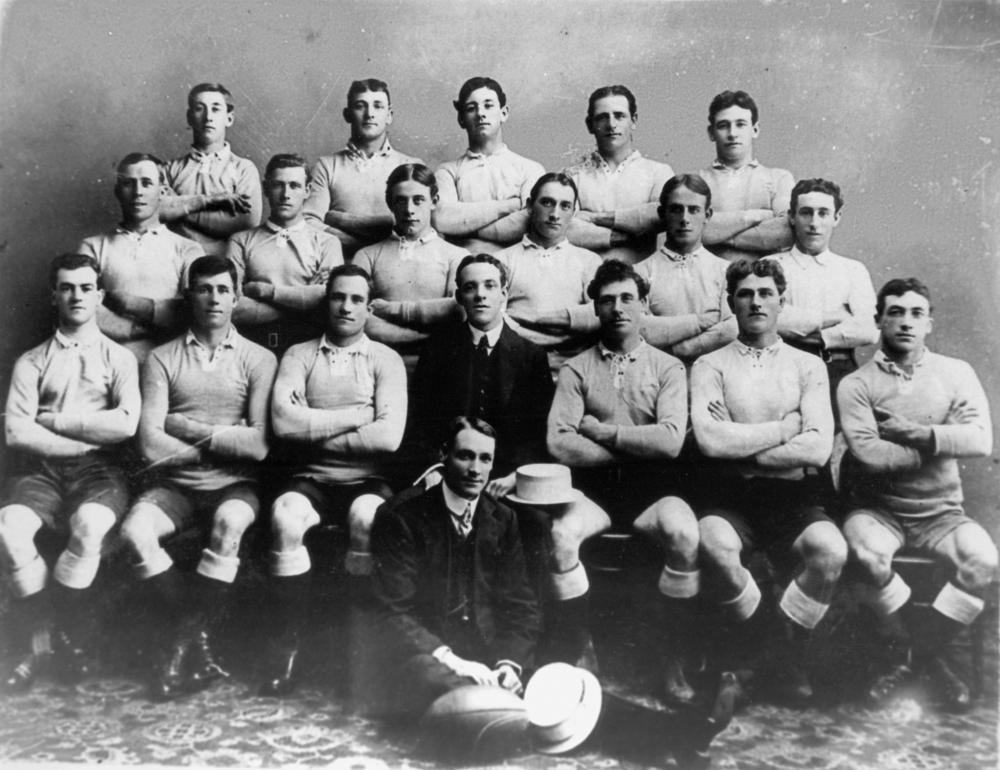
The first New South Wales team to go to Queensland in 1910.

The New South Wales rugby league team pre-dates the Australian national team, playing their inaugural match against a rebel New Zealand rugby team on the 1907–08 New Zealand rugby tour of Australia and Great Britain under existing rugby union rules. That inaugural "All Blues" side, the first football team assembled by the newly formed NSWRFL was:

Backs: Charles Hedley · Johnno Stuntz · Ed Fry · Dally Messenger · Frank Cheadle · Albert Rosenfeld · Lou D'Alpuget

Forwards: Harry Hamill · Arthur Hennessy · Bob Mable · Peter Moir · Sid Pearce · Billy Cann · Robert Graves · Herb Brackenreg

Two further matches were played against New Zealand before their tour took them to the Northern Hemisphere, with Jim Devereaux also featuring for the Blues. The visiting All Golds won all three games. However, on the return leg of their tour, almost a year later, with the New South Wales Rugby Football League premiership established, the Blues won the first two matches they ever played under 13-a-side rules against New Zealand. Later in 1908 the Queensland team, whose first taste of rugby league football was also against the visiting Kiwis, traveled to Sydney for the first series of games between the two states. New South Wales won all three matches, setting a precedent for interstate dominance that would continue throughout most of the 20th century.

In 1910 New South Wales defeated the touring England team in two of their three games. After that they became the first Blues side to travel to Queensland for the annual interstate series.

In 1912 the New South Wales team first toured New Zealand. They also visited New Zealand in 1913. During the 1913 New Zealand rugby league tour of Australia New South Wales played four matches against the Kiwis, winning three of them.

The New South Wales team lost its first game against Queensland in 1922. In 2019 the Blues also toured New Zealand.

During the 1951 French rugby league tour of Australia and New Zealand New South Wales played one match against the successful France national rugby league team, a 14-all draw.

The New South Wales team hosted 2 matches of the 1953 American All Stars tour of Australia and New Zealand at the Sydney Cricket Ground, winning 62–41 and 27–18.

In a 1954 tour match between Great Britain and New South Wales the referee left the field in disgust at the players' persistent fighting after 56 minutes so the match was abandoned.

=== State of Origin era (1980–present) ===
New South Wales' dominance over Queensland came to an end with the introduction of 'state of origin' selection rules in the early 1980s.

During the Super League war, in 1997 New South Wales was represented by two teams: one made up of players from clubs that remained loyal to the Australian Rugby League, which competed in the 1997 State of Origin series; another made up of players from clubs that joined the rebel Super League which competed in the one-off Super League Tri-series.

Ricky Stuart, who had previously coached New South Wales in 2005, was announced as the first full-time Blues coach in November 2010. Following the 2012 series, the Blues' seventh consecutive loss, Stuart resigned the role. Stuart took a role as the Parramatta Eels head coach in 2013, citing family reasons for his move. Although the Blues continued their losing streak during Stuart's tenure, he is credited with restoring passion and pride to the NSW jersey and closing the gap between the two states. He was replaced by former Canberra, NSW and Australia teammate Laurie Daley. Daley's appointment as NSW State of Origin coach was announced in August 2012 and effective from season 2013. Daley got job over candidates including Trent Barrett, Brad Fittler and Daniel Anderson. Daley coached the Blues to a series win in 2014, their first since 2005 and over his coaching rival and long time Canberra & Australian teammate Mal Meninga. Daley ended Meninga's and Queensland's run of eight series wins with victories in Game I and Game II of the 2014 series. In 2015, New South Wales suffered its biggest origin loss losing 52–6 against Queensland in the decider. In 2016, New South Wales lost the series 2–1 but managed to win the third and final dead rubber game. In 2017, New South Wales were widely tipped to win the series as Queensland had a number of key players injured. In Game 1, New South Wales beat Queensland in convincing fashion 28–4 and in Game 2 were leading the maroons 16–6 at halftime before Queensland won the game in the final two minutes to win 18–16. In Game 3, New South Wales lost the series losing 22–6 in Brisbane. In August 2017, Daley was terminated as coach of New South Wales.

In 2018, Brad Fittler was appointed as the new coach and left out established players such as Aaron Woods, Josh Jackson, Blake Ferguson and Josh Dugan. The Blues went on to win the series 2–1. In 2019, the Blues were widely tipped to win the series owing to the retirement from representative football of Queensland Origin greats Cooper Cronk, Billy Slater and Cameron Smith. However, Queensland had an upset win 18–14 over the Blues in Game 1 forcing Fittler to make seven changes to the Blues starting line-up. Though he was roundly criticised for the move, the Blues went on to win the series 2–1, easily defeating Queensland 38–6 in Game 2 in Optus Stadium in Perth Western Australia, the greatest winning margin of a Blues squad since Game 3, 2000. Finally, in a thrilling Game 3 at ANZ Stadium in Sydney, winger Blake Ferguson and fullback James Tedesco combined to score the winning try with just 32 seconds to go in the game to secure the series, off the back of play started from recalled halfback Mitchell Pearce. In the 2020 State of Origin series, New South Wales narrowly lost game 1 against Queensland 18–14 before bouncing back in game 2 winning 34–10. In game 3, New South Wales travelled to Brisbane for the decider, the blues would lose the match at Suncorp Stadium 20–14. The 2021 State of Origin series was one which had been interrupted by the COVID-19 pandemic with all three matches being played in Queensland. New South Wales would win convincingly in game 1 defeating Queensland 50–6 in Townsville before defeating Queensland 26–0 in Brisbane to claim the series. Queensland managed to avoid a series clean sweep by winning game 3 20–18. New South Wales started the 2022 State of Origin series with a narrow 16–10 loss in Sydney before a convincing 44–12 victory over Queensland in Perth during game 2. In game 3, the blues once again needed to play a decider in Brisbane. New South Wales lead the game 12–10 at half-time but conceded two late tries in the second half and lost 22–12.

Ahead of the 2024 State of Origin series, Fittler stood down as head coach and was replaced by Michael Maguire. In game one of the 2024 series, New South Wales lost 38–10 in Sydney. The game was marred by the sending off of Joseph Sua'ali'i in the seventh minute. In game two, New South Wales would win 38–18 at the Melbourne Cricket Ground to set up a decider in Brisbane. In game three, New South Wales would win 14–4 to claim the series and their first win in a decider at Brisbane since 2005.

On 1 October 2024, Michael Maguire stepped down as coach of the team with a search underway for a new coach.

== Colours and badge ==
The primary colour of New South Wales Blues is sky blue, which represents the state colour of New South Wales. The secondary colour is navy blue, with additional contrasting colour of white.

=== Shirt sponsors and manufacturers ===
Period	Kit manufacturer	Major Sponsor	Sleeve Sponsor/s	Minor Sponsor/s	Rear Sponsor/s	Shorts Sponsor/s
1980–1981	Westmont	–	–	–	–	KB Lager ^
1982–1983	Westmont	–	–	–	–	Winfield ^
1984–1986	Classic Sportswear	–	–	–	–	–
1987 USA Exhibition	Classic Sportswear	HFC Finance	–	–	–	–
1987–1988	Classic Sportswear	–	–	–	–	Winfield ^
1989–1990	Classic Sportswear	–	–	–	–	–
1991–1992	Classic Sportswear	~	Tooheys Blue	–	–	–
1993–1996	Classic Sportswear	~	Tooheys Blue	Tooheys^	–	–
1997	Canterbury	~	Tooheys	Coca-Cola^	–	Tooheys
1998–2000	Canterbury	~	Wizard Home Loans	Harvey Norman^	–	Wizard Home Loans
2001–2003	Canterbury	~	Wizard Home Loans	Harvey Norman / Philips / Wizard Home Loans	–	Wizard Home Loans
2004	Canterbury	Wizard Home Loans	–	Harvey Norman / Fujifilm / Wizard Home Loans	Wizard Home Loans	Wizard Home Loans
2005	Canterbury	Wizard Home Loans	PlayStation 2	Harvey Norman / Fujifilm / Wizard Home Loans	Wizard Home Loans	Wizard Home Loans
2006	Canterbury	Wizard Home Loans	PlayStation Portable	Harvey Norman / Fujifilm / Wizard Home Loans	Wizard Home Loans	Wizard Home Loans
2007	Canterbury	Wizard Home Loans	PlayStation	Harvey Norman / Fujifilm / Wizard Home Loans	Wizard Home Loans	Wizard Home Loans
2008	Canterbury	Wizard Home Loans	nib	Harvey Norman / Fujifilm / Wizard Home Loans	Wizard Home Loans	Wizard Home Loans
Game I–II 2009	Classic Sportswear	Wizard Home Loans	nib	Harvey Norman / Fujifilm / Wizard Home Loans	Wizard Home Loans	Wizard Home Loans
Game III 2009–2010	Classic Sportswear	Aussie Home Loans	nib	Harvey Norman / Fujifilm / Aussie Home Loans	Aussie Home Loans	Aussie Home Loans
2011	Classic Sportswear	Victoria Bitter	nib	Harvey Norman / Fujifilm	Victoria Bitter	Victoria Bitter
2012	Classic Sportswear	Victoria Bitter	nib	Harvey Norman / Fujifilm	Victoria Bitter	GIO
2013	Classic Sportswear	Victoria Bitter	nib	–	Victoria Bitter	GIO
2014–2015	Classic Sportswear	Victoria Bitter	nib	Holden^	Victoria Bitter	GIO
2016–2017	Classic Sportswear	Victoria Bitter	nib	Holden^	The Star	GIO
2018	Canterbury	Brydens Lawyers	nib	Holden^ / Kari	The Star	Tooheys New / University of New England
2019	Canterbury	Brydens Lawyers	nib	Kari	The Star	Tooheys New / University of New England
2020	Canterbury	Brydens Lawyers	nib	Tooheys New / Kari	The Star	Tooheys New / University of New England
2021	Puma	Brydens Lawyers	Tooheys New	Tooheys New / The Star / Ampol^	The Star	Maccas / NSWRL TV
2022	Puma	Brydens Lawyers	Tooheys New	Tooheys New / The Star	The Star / Ignite HQ	Maccas / Pain Away
2023	Puma	Westpac	Tooheys New	Tooheys New / The Star	The Star / Ignite HQ	Maccas / Pain Away
2024	Puma	Westpac	Tooheys New	Tooheys New / The Star	The Star / Ignite HQ	Maccas / Pain Away
2025-2029	Adidas					

– Denotes no applicable sponsor for the listed period.

~ Major sponsor logo was featured on the jersey sleeve rather than the front from 1991–2003.

- Since 1991, major sponsors logo has also featured above the NSW Blues logo on the team shorts. These are excluded from the "shorts sponsors" list unless the major sponsor logo also features on the rear/opposite leg to the team logo.
- Since 1991, major sponsors logo has also featured above the NSW Blues logo on the jersey bust. These are excluded from the "minor sponsors" list, aside from both Wizard & Aussie Home Loans, which featured additionally on the collar from 2001–2010.

^ Indicates the sponsor was the naming-rights partner of the State of Origin series at the time, but the logo was displayed independently of the State of Origin logo.

- "Winfield State of Origin" red box logo was added to the shorts in 1989 and featured until the end of the 1992 series, becoming the first naming rights partner to feature as a part of the State of Origin logo on a team kit.
- "Winfield State of Origin" was embroidered in a plain navy font onto the jersey bust in 1991 & 1992, becoming the first naming rights partner to appear on a jersey.
- Tooheys logo appeared on the jersey from 1993 until the conclusion of the 1996 series, no State of Origin logo was included on the jersey.
- Tooheys featured as a part of the State of Origin logo from 1993 until the conclusion of the 1996 series, included on the NSW Blues shorts in each of those years.
- Tooheys featured on the NSW Blues shorts in 1997 above the team logo as their major sponsor, Coca-Cola became naming rights partner of the series and became a part of the State of Origin logo on the shorts.

=== Supporters ===
The official New South Wales rugby league team supporter group is known as "Blatchy's Blues".

== Honours ==
State of Origin (18): 1985, 1986, 1990, 1992, 1993, 1994, 1996, 1997, 2000, 2003, 2004, 2005, 2014, 2018, 2019, 2021, 2024, 2026

Interstate Series (54): 1908, 1910, 1911, 1912, 1913, 1915, 1919, 1920, 1921, 1927, 1929, 1930, 1933, 1934, 1935, 1936, 1937, 1938, 1939, 1941, 1945, 1946, 1947, 1948, 1949, 1950, 1952, 1953, 1954, 1955, 1956, 1957, 1958, 1962, 1963, 1964, 1965, 1966, 1967, 1968, 1969, 1970, 1971, 1972, 197, 1973, 1974, 1975, 1976, 1977, 1978, 1979, 1980, 1981

== Players ==
=== Current squad ===
Pos.	Player	Date of birth (age)	Caps	Pts	Club
Prop	Mitchell Barnett	15 April 1994 (age 32)	3	0	New Zealand Warriors
Halfback	Nathan Cleary	14 November 1997 (age 28)	14	94	Penrith Panthers
Second-row	Angus Crichton	5 February 1996 (age 30)	14	4	Sydney Roosters
Centre	Stephen Crichton	22 September 2000 (age 25)	9	14	Canterbury Bulldogs
Fullback	Dylan Edwards	10 January 1996 (age 30)	2	1	Penrith Panthers
Centre	Campbell Graham	2 June 1999 (age 27)	0	0	South Sydney Rabbitohs
Prop	Payne Haas	12 February 1999 (age 27)	14	0	Brisbane Broncos
Prop	Max King	4 May 1997 (age 29)	0	0	Canterbury Bulldogs
Prop	Spencer Leniu	8 September 2000 (age 25)	3	0	Sydney Roosters
Wing	Zac Lomax	24 September 1999 (age 26)	3	8	Parramatta Eels
Second-row	Liam Martin	5 March 1997 (age 29)	12	8	Penrith Panthers
Centre	Latrell Mitchell	16 June 1997 (age 29)	8	36	South Sydney Rabbitohs
Five-eighth	Mitchell Moses	16 September 1994 (age 31)	5	4	Parramatta Eels
Second-row	Haumole Olakau'atu	1 October 1998 (age 27)	2	0	Manly Sea Eagles
Hooker	Reece Robson	18 June 1998 (age 28)	5	0	North Queensland Cowboys
Wing	Brian To'o	18 August 1998 (age 28)	12	24	Penrith Panthers
Prop	Stefano Utoikamanu	15 May 2000 (age 26)	1	0	Melbourne Storm
Hooker	Connor Watson	31 May 1996 (age 30)	2	0	Sydney Roosters
Lock	Isaah Yeo	6 November 1994 (age 31)	14	0	Penrith Panthers
Second-row	Hudson Young	11 June 1998 (age 28)	3	0	Canberra Raiders

=== Team of the Century (1908–2007) ===
Before Game I of the 2008 State of Origin series, to celebrate the game's centenary that year, New South Wales named their team of the century:

No.

Position
Player

Clive Churchill – FB Ken Irvine – WG Reg Gasnier – CE Graeme Langlands – CE Dally Messenger – WG Bob Fulton – FE Andrew Johns – HB Frank Burge – PR Sandy Pearce – HK

No.

Position
Player

Glenn Lazarus – PR Ron Coote – SR Norm Provan – SR Johnny Raper – LK Wally Prigg – positions Dave Brown – positions Steve Rogers – positions Roy Bull – positions

=== Hall of Fame ===
Ahead of the 2017 State of Origin series, NSW named the inaugural inductees to the NSWRL Hall of Fame, joining automatic inductees Dally Messenger and the seven Immortals who represented NSW.

Player	Year Inducted	Club/s
Clive Churchill	Automatic Selection	South Sydney
Bob Fulton	Automatic Selection	Manly-Warringah; Eastern Suburbs
Reg Gasnier	Automatic Selection	St. George
Johnny Raper	Automatic Selection	Newtown; St. George
Graeme Langlands	Automatic Selection	St. George
Arthur Beetson	Automatic Selection	Balmain; Eastern Suburbs
Andrew Johns	Automatic Selection	Newcastle
Bradley Clyde	2017	Canberra; Canterbury-Bankstown
Ron Coote	2017	South Sydney; Eastern Suburbs
Laurie Daley	2017	Canberra
Brad Fittler	2017	Penrith; Sydney City
Bob McCarthy	2017	South Sydney; Canterbury-Bankstown
Norm Provan	2017	St. George
Keith Holman	2018	Western Suburbs
Ken Irvine	2018	North Sydney; Manly-Warringah
Steve Rogers	2018	Cronulla-Sutherland; St. George
Steve Mortimer	2019	Canterbury-Bankstown
Tommy Raudonikis	2019	Western Suburbs; Newtown
Billy Smith	2021	St. George
Brett Kenny	2021	Parramatta
Glenn Lazarus	2021	Canberra; Brisbane; Melbourne
Ken Kearney	2022	St George
Harry Wells	2022	St George
Ricky Stuart	2022	Canberra
Danny Buderus	2023	Newcastle
Michael Cronin	2023	Parramatta
Frank Burge	2023	Glebe; St George
Dave Brown	2023	Eastern Suburbs
Herbert "Dally" Messenger	2023	Eastern Suburbs
Steve Roach	2024	Balmain
Michael O'Connor	2024	St George; Manly-Warringah
Ben Elias	2025	Balmain
Andrew Ettingshausen	2025	Cronulla-Sutherland
Paul Gallen	2025	Cronulla-Sutherland
Peter Sterling	2026	Parramatta
Boyd Cordner	2026	Sydney

=== Origin Greats ===
As part of the 25-year celebrations in 2005, New South Wales named 25 legends for each year before that.

No.

Position
Player

Tim Brasher – FB Noel Cleal – SR Bradley Clyde – LK Laurie Daley – FE Benny Elias – HK Andrew Ettingshausen – CE Brad Fittler – FE Eric Grothe Sr. – WG Paul Harragon – PR Garry Jack – FB Andrew Johns – HB Brett Kenny – FE

No.

Position
Player

Glenn Lazarus – PR Paul McGregor – CE Steve Mortimer – HB Michael O'Connor – WG Wayne Pearce – LK Ray Price – LK Steve Roach – PR Ian Roberts – PR Paul Sironen – SR Peter Sterling – HB Ricky Stuart – HB Geoff Toovey – HB Rod Wishart – WG

=== Captains ===
Player	Occasions	Game(s) as Captain
Tommy Raudonikis	1	1980
Steve Rogers	1	1981
Max Krilich	5	1982, Games 1 & 3 1983
Ray Price	3	Game 2 1983, Games 1 & 2 1984
Steve Mortimer	3	Game 3 1984, Games 1 & 2 1985
Wayne Pearce	10	Game 3 1985, 1986–1988
Peter Sterling	1	1987 Exhibition Match
Gavin Miller	3	1989
Ben Elias	6	1990, 1991
Laurie Daley	13	1992, 1993, 1994, 1998, Game 3 1999
Brad Fittler	14	1995–1996, Games 1 & 2 1999, 2000, 2001
Geoff Toovey	3	1997
Andrew Johns	6	2002, 2003
Danny Buderus	15	2004–2008
Kurt Gidley	5	2009, Games 1 & 2 2010
Trent Barrett	1	Game 3 2010
Paul Gallen	16	2011, 2012, Games 1 & 2 2013, 2014, Games 2 & 3 2015, 2016
Robbie Farah	2	Game 3 2013, Game 1 2015
Boyd Cordner	10	2017–2019, Game 1 2020
James Tedesco	10	Games 2 & 3 2020, 2021–2023
Jake Trbojevic	3	2024
Isaah Yeo	6	2025–2026

Table last updated: 1 November 2025.

== Coaches ==
New South Wales have had a total of thirteen different coaches at State of Origin level, eight of which have previously played for the Blues. The list also includes the known coaches from the pre-Origin era and only counts games against Queensland. Games against touring teams from New Zealand, Great Britain and France are not included. Ted Glossop, Frank Stanton and Terry Fearnley are the only coaches to have coached NSW in both State of Residence and State of Origin formats.

Coach	Era	Games	Wins	Success %	Series won
Dick Dunn	1961	4	2	50%	–
Harry Bath	1962, 1968–1972	11	10	91%	–
Eddie Burns	1963–1964	2	2	100%	–
Ian Walsh	1965	1	1	100%	–
Paul Quinn	1965	1	1	100%	–
Noel Kelly	1966	3	3	100%	–
Reg Gasnier	1967	2	1	50%	–
Ron Saddler	1967	1	1	100%	–
Graeme Langlands	1973–1976	12	9	75%	–
Ted Glossop	1980–1981, 1983	9	5	55%	0
Frank Stanton	1978–1979, 1982, 1984	11	7	64%	0
Terry Fearnley	1977, 1985	5	4	80%	1
Ron Willey	1986–1987	7	5	71%	1
John Peard	1988	3	0	0%	0
Jack Gibson	1989–1990	6	2	33%	1
Tim Sheens	1991	3	1	33%	0
Phil Gould	1992–1996; 2002–2004	24	14	58%	6
Tommy Raudonikis	1997–1998	6	3	50%	1
Wayne Pearce	1999–2001	9	5	56%	1
Ricky Stuart	2005; 2011–2012	9	4	44%	1
Graham Murray	2006–2007	6	2	33%	0
Craig Bellamy	2008–2010	9	2	22%	0
Laurie Daley	2013–2017, 2025–2026	21	9	43%	2
Brad Fittler	2018–2023	18	9	50%	3
Michael Maguire	2024	3	2	67%	1
Matt King	2027	0	0	–	0

Table last updated: 14 June 2024.

Notes:
- Terry Fearnley coached NSW to two wins from two matches in 1977 under residential selection and two wins from three games in 1985 under origin selection.
- Frank Stanton coached NSW to three wins from three matches under residential selection in 1978 and 1979, six from six in all. Stanton coached NSW under origin selection in 1982 and 1984, with NSW winning one match in each six game series, the first game in 1982 and the third game in 1984.
- Ted Glossop coached NSW to two wins from two matches under residential selection in 1980 and 1981, four from four in all. Glossop coached NSW in the first two one-off Origin games in 1980 and 1981, losing both, and then in the three-match Origin series in 1983. NSW won the second game in 1983 but lost the first and third matches.

== Brad Fittler Medal ==
First awarded in 2005, the Brad Fittler medal is the award for the New South Wales Player of the Series.

Recipients
Year	Player	Position	Club team
2005	Matt King	Wing	Melbourne Storm
2006	Steve Menzies	Second-row	Manly Warringah Sea Eagles
2007	Jarryd Hayne	Wing	Parramatta Eels
2008	Danny Buderus	Hooker	Newcastle Knights
2009	Jarryd Hayne (2)	Wing	Parramatta Eels
2010	Kurt Gidley	Fullback	Newcastle Knights
2011	Paul Gallen	Prop	Cronulla-Sutherland Sharks
2012	Robbie Farah	Hooker	Wests Tigers
2013	Greg Bird	Lock	Gold Coast Titans
2014	Jarryd Hayne (3)	Fullback	Parramatta Eels
2014	Ryan Hoffman	Second-row	Melbourne Storm
2015	Josh Dugan	Fullback	St. George Illawarra Dragons
2016	Josh Jackson	Second-row	Canterbury-Bankstown Bulldogs
2017	David Klemmer	Prop	Canterbury-Bankstown Bulldogs
2018	James Tedesco	Fullback	Sydney Roosters
2019	James Tedesco (2)	Fullback	Sydney Roosters
2020	Nathan Cleary	Halfback	Penrith Panthers
2021	Tom Trbojevic	Centre	Manly Warringah Sea Eagles
2022	James Tedesco (3)	Fullback	Sydney Roosters
2023	Brian To’o	Wing	Penrith Panthers
2024	Angus Crichton	Second-row	Sydney Roosters
2025	Brian To’o (2)	Wing	Penrith Panthers

== Support ==
The NSW Blues are widely supported within New South Wales (NSW) and the nearby Australian Capital Territory (ACT). The Blues also garner support from rugby league fans outside the state in the State of Origin series against the Queensland Maroons, though the Maroons are regarded as the more popular side in other Australian states and territories as well as overseas.

Ahead of Game III of the 2026 State of Origin series, data from the National Rugby League (NRL) found that the Maroons were the most popular team in the series. The data found that among NRL account holders, while NSW was more widely supported overseas in the United Kingdom and the United States, only a minority of fans in Oceania supported the side, ranging from 49.5% in New Zealand (primarily on the North Island), to 49.1% in Western Australia, to 42.1% in Papua New Guinea (PNG), to 41.2% in the Northern Territory, to 38.2% in Victoria, to 35.0% in Tasmania. Following the data release, Blues hooker Reece Robson suggested that the Maroons' greater success (such as the period in which the team won eight consecutive Origin shields) drew neutral fans to the Maroons, citing some of his own friends as examples.

== See also ==
- Rugby league in New South Wales
