= 2022 Penrith Panthers season =

Sporting team, Penrith Panther 2022 NRL season

- 2022 NRL premiers
- NRL Rank: 1st (Premiers)
- 2022 record: Wins: 20; draws: 0; losses: 4
- Points scored: For: 628; against: 292

Team information
- CEO: Matt Cameron (PDRLFC); Brian Fletcher (Panthers Group)
- Coach: Ivan Cleary
- Captain: Nathan Cleary & Isaah Yeo
- Stadium: BlueBet Stadium – 22,500; Carrington Park – 13,000 (round 3 only)
- Avg. attendance: 17,576
- High attendance: 21,348

Top scorers
- Tries: Taylan May (16)
- Goals: Nathan Cleary (71)
- Points: Nathan Cleary (165)
← 2021	List of seasons	2023 →

The 2022 Penrith Panthers season is the 56th season in the club's history. Coached by Ivan Cleary and co-captained by Nathan Cleary and Isaah Yeo, the Panthers competed in the National Rugby League's 2022 Telstra Premiership.

== Squad ==
Penrith Panthers 2022 squad
Top 30 NRL squad - 2022 season			Development players	Coaching staff
Eddie Blacker – PR; Nathan Cleary (c) – HB; Christian Crichton – WG; Stephen Crichton – CE; Dylan Edwards (vc) – FB; Matt Eisenhuth – PR, LK; Kurt Falls – FE, HB; James Fisher-Harris (vc) – PR; J'maine Hopgood – LK; Tom Jenkins – CE, WG	Robert Jennings – CE, WG; Mitch Kenny – HK, LK; Viliame Kikau – SR; Apisai Koroisau – HK; Spencer Leniu – PR; Moses Leota – PR; Jarome Luai – FE; Soni Luke – HK; Liam Martin – SR; Taylan May – WG	Sean O'Sullivan – HB, FE; Jaeman Salmon – SR, FE; Chris Smith – SR, LK; Lindsay Smith – PR, LK; Scott Sorensen – PR, LK, SR; Charlie Staines – WG, FB; Izack Tago – CE; Brian To'o – WG; Sunia Turuva – FB, CE, WG; Isaah Yeo (c) – LK	Mavrik Geyer – SR, PR; Liam Henry – PR, LK; Preston Riki – SR; Extended squad: Jack Cole – FE, CE, HB; Ativalu Lisati – SR, LK	Head coach: Ivan Cleary; Assistant coaches: Andrew Webster; Cameron Ciraldo; Ben Harden (Pathways Coach); Peter Wallace (NSW Cup Coach); Jono Rolfe (Jersey Flegg Cup Coach); Legend: (c) Captain(s); (vc) Vice-captain(s); Updated: 6 September 2022; Source(s): Panthers Team Profiles

=== Player transfers ===
A † denotes that the transfer occurred during the 2022 season.

Gains
Player	Signed from	Until end of	Notes
Christian Crichton	Canterbury Bankstown Bulldogs	2022	
Chris Smith	Canterbury Bankstown Bulldogs	2022	
Sean O'Sullivan	New Zealand Warriors	2022	
Soni Luke		2023	

Losses
Player	Signed to	Until end of	Notes
Tevita Pangai Junior	Canterbury Bankstown Bulldogs	2024	
Matt Burton	Canterbury Bankstown Bulldogs	2024	
Brent Naden	Canterbury Bankstown Bulldogs	2023	
Kurt Capewell	Brisbane Broncos	2024	
Paul Momirovski	Sydney Roosters	2024	
Tyrone May	Catalans Dragons	2022	

== Fixtures ==
=== Pre-season ===
Date	Trial	Opponent	Venue	Score	Tries	Goals
Sunday, 20 February	1	Cronulla Sharks	CommBank Stadium	6 - 30	Falls, Geyer, Puru (2), Cohen, Jennings	Falls (5/6)
Sunday, 20 February	2	Parramatta Eels	BlueBet Stadium	0 - 36		
Legend: Win Loss Draw

=== Regular season ===
Date	Round	Opponent	Venue	Score	Tries	Goals	Attendance
Thursday, 10 March	1	Manly-Warringah Sea Eagles	BlueBet Stadium	28 - 6	Tago, Crichton, Luai, Koroisau, Martin	Crichton (4/6)	16,901
Friday, 18 March	2	St George Illawarra Dragons	Netstrata Jubilee Stadium	16 - 20	Kikau (2), Leniu	Crichton (4/4)	10,057
Saturday, 26 March	3	Newcastle Knights	Carrington Park	38 - 20	May (3), Tago (2), Crichton, Staines	Crichton (5/8)	11,253
Friday, 1 April	4	South Sydney Rabbitohs	BlueBet Stadium	26 - 12	Tago, Crichton, May (2), Martin	Cleary (3/6)	20,521
Sunday, 10 April	5	Canterbury-Bankstown Bulldogs	CommBank Stadium	12 - 32	May, Edwards, Martin, Leniu, Kenny	Cleary (6/6)	11,157
Friday, 15 April	6	Brisbane Broncos	BlueBet Stadium	40 - 12	Luai, Sorenson, Staines, May, Martin, Leniu, Tago	Cleary (6/7)	19,457
Sunday, 24 April	7	Canberra Raiders	BlueBet Stadium	36 - 6	Crichton (3), Yeo, May, Kikau	Cleary (6/7)	20,612
Friday, 29 April	8	Gold Coast Titans	Cbus Super Stadium	4 - 18	Tago, Cleary, Luai	Cleary (3/3)	14,102
Friday, 6 May	9	Parramatta Eels	BlueBet Stadium	20 - 22	Edwards, May (2), Leniu	Cleary (2/4)	21,348
saturday, 14 May	10	Melbourne Storm	Suncorp Stadium	6 - 32	Tago (2), Kikau, Luai, Crichton	Cleary (6/6)	46,454*
Saturday, 21 May	11	Sydney Roosters	Sydney Cricket Ground	12 - 32	Luai (2), Koroisau, Crichton, Fisher-Harris	Cleary (6/6)	14,482
Friday, 27 May	12	North Queensland Cowboys	BlueBet Stadium	22 - 0	Yeo, Edwards, To'o, May	Cleary (2/3), Crichton (1/1)	17,125
Friday, 3 June	13	Canterbury-Bankstown Bulldogs	BlueBet Stadium	30 - 18	Smith, Edwards, May, Kikau, Salmon	Falls (5/6)	16,906
Sunday, 12 June	14	Newcastle Knights	McDonald Jones Stadium	6 - 42	Cleary, Kikau, May, To'o (2), Tago, Crichton	Cleary (7/8)	21,332
Saturday, 18 June	15	New Zealand Warriors	Moreton Daily Stadium	6 - 40	Leota, Edwards, May, To'o (2), Yeo, Martin	Cleary (5/6), Crichton (1/1)	8,127
Friday, 1 July	16	Sydney Roosters	BlueBet Stadium	26 - 18	To'o, Kikau, Tago, Koroisau	Cleary (5/5)	16,725
	17	Bye					
Sunday, 17 July	18	Wests Tigers	CommBank Stadium	16 - 18	Tago, Kikau, Fisher-Harris	Falls (2/2), O'Sullivan (1/1)	11,464
Saturday, 23 July	19	Cronulla Sharks	BlueBet Stadium	20 - 10	Tago, Edwards, Luai	Cleary (4/4)	17,426
Friday, 29 July	20	Parramatta Eels	CommBank Stadium	34 - 10	O'Sullivan, Martin	O'Sullivan (1/2)	26,912
Saturday, 6 August	21	Canberra Raiders	GIO Stadium	6 - 26	Koroisau, Crichton, Edwards, Salmon	Crichton (5/5)	16,912
Thursday, 11 August	22	Melbourne Storm	BlueBet Stadium	0 - 16			15,612
Thursday, 18 August	23	South Sydney Rabbitohs	Accor Stadium	22 - 26	Crichton, Edwards, Leniu, Martin	Crichton (5/6)	15,206
Friday, 26 August	24	New Zealand Warriors	BlueBet Stadium	46 - 12	May (2), To'o (2), O'Sullivan, Crichton, Kikau, Yeo	Crichton (7/8)	17,025
Saturday, 3 September	25	North Queensland Cowboys	Queensland Country Bank Stadium	38 - 8	Jennings, Turuva	Falls (0/2)	23,840
Legend: Win Loss Draw Bye

- Round 10 attendance refers to the total attendance on day 2 of magic round.

=== Finals ===
Qualifying and elimination finals
9 Sept, BlueBet Stadium
1	Panthers	27
4	Eels	8
10 Sept, AAMI Park
5	Storm	20
8	Raiders	28
11 Sept, Allianz Stadium
6	Roosters	14
7	Rabbitohs	30
10 Sept, PointsBet Stadium
2	Sharks	30
3	Cowboys	32

Semi-finals
16 Sept, CommBank Stadium
Eels	40
Raiders	4
17 Sept, Allianz Stadium
Sharks	12
Rabbitohs	38

Preliminary finals
24 Sept, Accor Stadium
Panthers	32
Rabbitohs	12
23 Sept, QLD Country Bank Stadium
Cowboys	20
Eels	24

Grand final
2 Oct, Accor Stadium
Panthers	28
Eels	12

Date	Round	Opponent	Venue	Score	Tries	Goals	Attendance
Friday, 9 September	Qualifying Final	Parramatta Eels	BlueBet Stadium	27 - 8	To'o (2), Edwards, Fisher-Harris	Cleary (5/5) (1 FG)	21,863
Saturday, 24 September	Preliminary Final	South Sydney Rabbitohs	Accor Stadium	32 - 12	Koroisau, To'o, Leniu, Tago, Cleary	Cleary (6/6	50,034
Sunday, 3 October	Grand Final	Parramatta Eels	Accor Stadium	28 - 12	Crichton, To'o (2), Sorensen, Staines	Cleary (4/6)	82,415

== Ladder ==
2022 NRL season
Pos	Team	Pld	W	D	L	B	PF	PA	PD	Pts
1	Penrith Panthers (P)	24	20	0	4	1	636	330	+306	42
2	Cronulla-Sutherland Sharks	24	18	0	6	1	573	364	+209	38
3	North Queensland Cowboys	24	17	0	7	1	633	361	+272	36
4	Parramatta Eels	24	16	0	8	1	608	489	+119	34
5	Melbourne Storm	24	15	0	9	1	657	410	+247	32
6	Sydney Roosters	24	15	0	9	1	635	434	+201	32
7	South Sydney Rabbitohs	24	14	0	10	1	604	474	+130	30
8	Canberra Raiders	24	14	0	10	1	524	461	+63	30
9	Brisbane Broncos	24	13	0	11	1	514	550	−36	28
10	St. George Illawarra Dragons	24	12	0	12	1	469	569	−100	26
11	Manly Warringah Sea Eagles	24	9	0	15	1	490	595	−105	20
12	Canterbury-Bankstown Bulldogs	24	7	0	17	1	383	575	−192	16
13	Gold Coast Titans	24	6	0	18	1	455	660	−205	14
14	Newcastle Knights	24	6	0	18	1	372	662	−290	14
15	New Zealand Warriors	24	6	0	18	1	408	700	−292	14
16	Wests Tigers	24	4	0	20	1	352	679	−327	10

=== Ladder progression ===
- Numbers highlighted in green indicate that the team finished the round inside the top eight.
- Numbers highlighted in blue indicate the team finished first on the ladder in that round.
- Numbers highlighted in red indicate the team finished last place on the ladder in that round.
- Underlined numbers indicate that the team had a bye during that round.

	Team	1	2	3	4	5	6	7	8	9	10	11	12	13	14	15	16	17	18	19	20	21	22	23	24	25
1	Penrith Panthers	2	4	6	8	10	12	14	16	16	18	20	22	24	26	28	30	32	34	36	36	38	38	40	42	42
2	Cronulla-Sutherland Sharks	0	2	4	6	8	8	10	10	12	12	14	14	16	18	20	22	24	26	26	28	30	32	34	36	38
3	North Queensland Cowboys	0	2	4	4	4	6	8	10	12	14	16	16	18	20	22	24	26	26	28	30	32	32	34	34	36
4	Parramatta Eels	2	2	4	6	8	8	10	10	12	12	14	16	18	18	20	20	22	24	24	26	28	28	30	32	34
5	Melbourne Storm	2	4	4	6	8	10	12	14	16	16	16	18	20	22	24	24	24	24	24	26	28	30	32	32	32
6	Sydney Roosters	0	2	2	4	6	8	8	8	10	12	12	14	14	14	14	14	16	18	20	22	24	26	28	30	32
7	South Sydney Rabbitohs	0	0	2	2	4	6	6	8	8	10	10	12	14	16	16	18	20	22	24	24	26	28	28	30	30
8	Canberra Raiders	2	2	4	4	4	4	4	4	6	8	10	10	12	12	14	14	16	18	20	22	22	24	26	28	30
9	Brisbane Broncos	2	4	4	4	4	4	6	8	10	12	14	16	18	20	20	20	22	24	26	26	26	28	28	28	28
10	St. George Illawarra Dragons	2	2	2	2	2	4	6	8	8	8	10	12	14	14	16	18	18	18	20	20	20	20	22	24	26
11	Manly Warringah Sea Eagles	0	0	2	4	6	8	8	8	10	10	10	10	12	14	14	16	18	20	20	20	20	20	20	20	20
12	Canterbury-Bankstown Bulldogs	2	2	2	2	2	2	2	4	4	4	4	4	4	6	8	8	10	10	12	14	14	14	14	14	16
13	Gold Coast Titans	0	2	2	4	4	4	4	4	4	6	6	6	6	6	6	6	8	8	8	8	8	10	10	12	14
14	Newcastle Knights	2	4	4	4	4	4	4	4	4	6	6	8	10	10	10	12	12	12	12	12	14	14	14	14	14
15	New Zealand Warriors	0	0	2	4	6	6	6	8	8	8	8	8	8	8	8	10	12	12	12	12	12	14	14	14	14
16	Wests Tigers	0	0	0	0	0	2	4	4	4	4	6	6	8	8	8	8	8	8	8	10	10	10	10	10	10

== Other teams ==
In addition to competing in the National Rugby League, the Panthers are fielding semi-professional teams in the 2022 Jersey Flegg Cup (for players aged under 21) and the New South Wales Rugby League's The Knock-On Effect NSW Cup (NSW Cup). The 2022 season brought success to the Penrith Panthers seeing them become premiers in SG Ball, Jersey Flegg and NSW Cup.

== Representative honours ==
=== Domestic ===
Pos.	Player	Team	Call-up	Ref.
HB	Nathan Cleary	New South Wales	2022 State of Origin	
FE	Jarome Luai	New South Wales	2022 State of Origin	
LK	Isaah Yeo	New South Wales	2022 State of Origin	
WG	Brian To'o	New South Wales	2022 State of Origin	
SR	Liam Martin	New South Wales	2022 State of Origin	
HK	Apisai Koroisau	New South Wales	2022 State of Origin	
CE	Stephen Crichton	New South Wales	2022 State of Origin	

=== International ===
Pos.	Player	Team	Call-up	Ref.
HB	Nathan Cleary	Australia	2021 Men's Rugby League World Cup	
SR	Liam Martin	Australia	2021 Men's Rugby League World Cup	
LK	Isaah Yeo	Australia	2021 Men's Rugby League World Cup	
PR	James Fisher-Harris	New Zealand	2021 Men's Rugby League World Cup	
PR	Moses Leota	New Zealand	2021 Men's Rugby League World Cup	
PR	Scott Sorensen	New Zealand	2021 Men's Rugby League World Cup	
HK	Soni Luke	Tonga	2021 Men's Rugby League World Cup	
HB	Isaiya Katoa	Tonga	2021 Men's Rugby League World Cup	
WG	Taylan May	Samoa	2021 Men's Rugby League World Cup	
CE	Izack Tago	Samoa	2021 Men's Rugby League World Cup	
PR	Spencer Leniu	Samoa	2021 Men's Rugby League World Cup	
FE	Jarome Luai	Samoa	2021 Men's Rugby League World Cup	
FB	Sunia Turuva	Fiji	2021 Men's Rugby League World Cup	
SR	Viliame Kikau	Fiji	2021 Men's Rugby League World Cup	
HK	Apisai Koroisau	Fiji	2021 Men's Rugby League World Cup	
PR	James Fisher-Harris	Māori All Stars	2022 All Stars match	
PR	James Fisher-Harris	New Zealand	2022 Test vs Tonga	
PR	Moses Leota	New Zealand	2022 Test vs Tonga	
HK	Soni Luke	Tonga	2022 Test vs New Zealand	
FB	Charlie Staines	Samoa	2022 Test vs Cook Islands	
WG	Taylan May	Samoa	2022 Test vs Cook Islands	
CE	Izack Tago	Samoa	2022 Test vs Cook Islands	
PR	Spencer Leniu	Samoa	2022 Test vs Cook Islands	
FB	Sunia Turuva	Fiji	2022 Test vs PNG	
SR	Viliame Kikau	Fiji	2022 Test vs PNG	
