= 2021 Penrith Panthers season =

- 2021 NRL premiers
- NRL Rank: 2nd (Premiers)
- 2021 record: Wins: 21; draws: 0; losses: 3
- Points scored: For: 676; against: 286

Team information
- CEO: Brian Fletcher
- Coach: Ivan Cleary
- Captain: Nathan Cleary & Isaah Yeo
- Stadium: BlueBet Stadium – 22,500; Carrington Park – 13,000 (round 8 only)
- Avg. attendance: 11,649
- High attendance: 20,890

Top scorers
- Tries: Matt Burton (16)
- Goals: Nathan Cleary (88)
- Points: Nathan Cleary (219)
← 2020	List of seasons	2022 →

The 2021 Penrith Panthers season is the 55th season in the club's history. Coached by Ivan Cleary and co-captained by Nathan Cleary and Isaah Yeo, the Panthers are competing in the National Rugby League's 2021 Telstra Premiership. After the Panthers round 2 victory against the Canterbury-Bankstown Bulldogs the Panthers become the first team in NRL history to win the opening two rounds holding the opposition to nil as well as the first team to hold the opposition to nil in three regular season games in a row. Due to COVID-19 restrictions, Bluebet stadium was reduced to a capacity of 14,077 in rounds 1 and 3; after this in round 5 further lifting of restrictions meant that a crowd of 20,890 would be allowed into the stadium. This large crowd, however, was short-lived as Panthers misunderstood the new COVID restrictions, meaning tickets for the hills were oversold. From round 7 onwards the new capacity would be 16,110 until restrictions eased further. After round 12 was completed, the NSW and Queensland state of origin sides were announced for game one, where a record 7 Panthers were selected to represent their state. As a consequence, in round 13 Penrith would have to play without 7 of their stars and 3 debutants for the club. After 27 straight regular season wins and 12 straight to start the season, the win streak was broken, losing 26–6 against rivals the Wests Tigers. Penrith finished second overall at the end of the regular season and went on to play South Sydney in the first week of the finals series. They would go on to lose 10 – 16 but after wins against the Parramatta Eels (8 – 6) and Melbourne Storm (6 – 10) they would set up a rematch against the Rabbitohs. In the grand final Penrith were the eventual Premiers winning 14 – 12, their third title and first since 2003.

== Squad ==
Penrith Panthers 2021 Squad
Top 30 squad – 2021 season			Development Players	Coaching Staff
Eddie Blacker – PR; Matt Burton (gk) – FE, CE, HB; Kurt Capewell – SR, CE; Nathan Cleary (gk) (c) – HB; Stephen Crichton (gk) – CE, FB; Dylan Edwards (vc) – FB; Matt Eisenhuth – PR, LK; James Fisher-Harris (vc) – PR; J'maine Hopgood – LK, PR; Robert Jennings – WG, CE	Mitch Kenny – HK, LK; Viliame Kikau – SR; Apisai Koroisau – HK; Spencer Leniu – PR; Moses Leota – PR; Jarome Luai (gk) – FE, HB; Liam Martin – SR, LK; Taylan May – CE, WG; Tyrone May – FE, LK, CE, HK, FB; Paul Momirovski – CE (gk)	Brent Naden – CE, WG, FB; Tevita Pangai Jnr – SR, PR, LK; Jaeman Salmon – FE, CE; Lindsay Smith – PR; Scott Sorensen – SR, LK; Charlie Staines – WG, FB; Izack Tago – CE, SR; Brian To'o – WG; Isaah Yeo (c) – LK	Kurt Falls – HB; Brendan Hands – HK, HB; Shannon Harris – CE, SR; Sunia Turuva – FB, CE	Head coach: Ivan Cleary; Assistant coaches: Andrew Webster; Cameron Ciraldo; Peter Wallace (ISP NSW coach); Ben Harden (Jersey Flegg coach); Hayden Knowles (head of performance); Legend: (c) Captain(s); (vc) Vice-captain(s); Updated: 22 July 2021; Source(s): Panthers Team Profiles

=== Player transfers ===
A † denotes that the transfer occurred during the 2021 season.

Gains
Player	Signed from	Until end of	Notes
Robert Jennings	Wests Tigers	2021	
Matt Eisenhuth	Wests Tigers	2022	
Jaeman Salmon	Parramatta Eels	2021	
Scott Sorensen	Cronulla-Sutherland Sharks	2021	
Paul Momirovski	Wests Tigers	2022	
Eddie Blacker†	St. George Illawarra Dragons	2021	

Losses
Player	Signed To	Until end of	Notes
James Tamou	Wests Tigers	2022	
Jack Hetherington	Canterbury-Bankstown Bulldogs	2022	
Caleb Aekins	Canberra Raiders	2021	
Zane Tetevano	Leeds Rhinos (Super League)	2023	
Malakai Watene-Zelezniak	Retired	–	
Josh Mansour	South Sydney Rabbitohs	2022	
Daine Laurie	Wests Tigers	2023	
Dean Whare	Catalans Dragons (Super League)	2022	
Billy Burns†	St. George Illawarra Dragons		
Pat Hollis	Released	–	
Brayden McGrady	Released	–	

== Fixtures ==
=== Pre-season ===
Date	Trial	Opponent	Venue	Score	Tries	Goals
Saturday, 27 February	1	Parramatta Eels	Panthers Stadium	16 - 6	Luai, Cleary	Cleary (2/2), Burton (0/1)
Legend: Win Loss Draw

=== Regular season ===
Date	Round	Opponent	Venue	Score	Tries	Goals	Attendance
Saturday, 13 March	1	North Queensland Cowboys	Panthers Stadium	24 – 0	Capewell, Edwards, To'o, Yeo	Cleary (4/5)	14,077
Saturday, 20 March	2	Canterbury-Bankstown Bulldogs	Bankwest Stadium	0 – 28	Kikau (2), May, Momirovski (2)	Cleary (2/3), Crichton (2/2)	5,062
Thursday, 25 March	3	Melbourne Storm	BlueBet Stadium	12 – 10	Staines, Capewell	Crichton (2/3)	14,077
Thursday, 1 April	4	Manly Warringah Sea Eagles	Lottoland	6 – 46	To'o (2), Leota, Kikau (2), Burton, Capewell, Momirovski	Cleary (7/9)	6,076
Friday, 9 April	5	Canberra Raiders	BlueBet Stadium	30 - 10	Staines (2), Burton, Luai, Cleary	Cleary (5/5)	20,890
Thursday, 15 April	6	Brisbane Broncos	Suncorp Stadium	12 - 20	Capewell, Burton, Cleary	Cleary (3/4) 2 Point FG (1/1)	21,224
Thursday, 22 April	7	Newcastle Knights	BlueBet Stadium	24 - 6	Crichton, Burton, Edwards, To'o	Cleary (4/5)	16,110
Saturday, 1 May	8	Manly Warringah Sea Eagles	Carrington Park	28 - 16	Edwards, To'o, Martin, May, Crichton	Cleary (4/5)	5,798
Friday, 7 May	9	Cronulla Sharks	BlueBet Stadium	48 - 0	Fisher-Harris, Staines (3), Crichton, Kikau, Eisenhuth	Cleary (8/8)	16,110
Sunday, 16 May	10	Gold Coast Titans	Suncorp Stadium	48 - 12	Cleary (3), Fisher-Harris, Leota, Staines (2), Martin	Cleary (8/8)	43,537*
Sunday, 23 May	11	South Sydney Rabbitohs	Caltex Park	12 - 56	Cleary (2), Viliame Kikau, Kapewell, Burton (3), To'o, Crichton	Cleary (10/11)	10,824
Saturday, 29 May	12	Canterbury-Bankstown Bulldogs	BlueBet Stadium	30 - 4	Staines (2), Leniu, Momirovski, Burton, Crichton	Cleary (3/6)	16,110
Friday, 4 June	13	Wests Tigers	Leichhardt Oval	26 - 6	Burton	Crichton (1/1)	9,127
Friday, 11 June	14	Cronulla Sharks	Netstrata Jubilee Stadium	19 - 18	Burton (2), Tago	Crichton (3/4)	5,217
Friday, 18 June	15	Sydney Roosters	BlueBet Stadium	38 - 12	Crichton, To'o (2), Yeo, Cleary, Staines	Cleary (5/6)	14,406
Friday, 2 July	16	Parramatta Eels	BlueBet Stadium	13 - 12	May, Koroisau	Crichton (2/2), Burton (1/2) FG	0*
	17	Bye					
Sunday, 18 July	18	New Zealand Warriors	Suncorp Stadium	16 - 30	Kikau (2), To’o, Staines (2), Martin	Crichton (3/6)	24,894
Saturday, 24 July	19	Brisbane Broncos	Suncorp Stadium	18 - 12	To'o, Staines, Crichton	Crichton (1/1), Burton (1/3), Edwards (1/1) 2 Point FG	8,019
Saturday, 31 July	20	Melbourne Storm	Suncorp Stadium	37 - 10	Naden, Sorenson	Burton (1/2)	0
Saturday, 7 August	21	Sydney Roosters	Suncorp Stadium	14 - 20	Burton (2), Momirovski	Burton (2/2)	0
Friday, 13 August	22	St. George Illawarra Dragons	Suncorp Stadium	16 - 34	Naden (2), Edwards (2), Burton, Momirovski	Cleary (5/6)	6,653
Friday, 20 August	23	South Sydney Rabbitohs	Suncorp Stadium	25 - 12	Cleary, Crichton, Naden, Koroisau	Cleary (4/6), (1/1) FG	8,848
Sunday, 29 August	24	Wests Tigers	Moreton Daily Stadium	30 - 16	Leota, Pangai Junior, Luai, Kikau, To'o	Cleary (5/5)	5,351
Friday, 3 September	25	Parramatta Eels	Cbus Super Stadium	6 - 40	To'o (3), Pangai Junior, Burton, Koroisau, Cleary	Cleary (6/7)	8,580
Legend: Win Loss Draw Bye

- TBA = To be announced
- Round 10 attendance refers to the total attendance on day 3 of magic round
- Round 16 was played without crowds due to the June outbreak and lockdown in NSW
- Round 20 and 21 was played without crowds due to lockdown in QLD

=== Bracket ===
Qualifying and elimination finals
10 September – Sunshine Coast
1	Melbourne	40
4	Manly Warringah	12
11 September – Townsville
5	Sydney	25
8	Gold Coast	24
12 September – Rockhampton
6	Parramatta	28
7	Newcastle	20
11 September – Townsville
2	Penrith	10
3	South Sydney	16

Semi-finals
17 September – Mackay
Manly Warringah	42
Sydney	6
18 September – Mackay
Penrith	8
Parramatta	6

Preliminary finals
25 September – Brisbane
Melbourne	6
Penrith	10
24 September – Brisbane
South Sydney	36
Manly Warringah	16

Grand final
3 October – Brisbane
Penrith	14
South Sydney	12

Date	Round	Opponent	Venue	Score	Tries	Goals	Attendance
Saturday, 11 September	Qualifying Final	South Sydney Rabbitohs	Queensland Country Bank Stadium	10 - 16	Crichton	Cleary (3/3)	18,224
Saturday, 18 September	Semi Final	Parramatta	BB Print Stadium	8 - 6	Capewell	Cleary (2/2)	6,011
Saturday, 25 September	Preliminary Final	Melbourne Storm	Suncorp Stadium	10 - 6	Crichton, To'o	Cleary (1/2)	29,011
Sunday, 3 October	Grand Final	South Sydney Rabbitohs	Suncorp Stadium	14 - 12	Burton, Crichton	Cleary (3/3)	39,322

== Ladder ==
Pos	Team	Pld	W	D	L	B	PF	PA	PD	Pts	
1	Melbourne Storm (M)	24	21	0	3	1	815	316	+499	44	Advance to finals series
2	Penrith Panthers (P)	24	21	0	3	1	676	286	+390	44	Advance to finals series
3	South Sydney Rabbitohs	24	20	0	4	1	775	453	+322	42	Advance to finals series
4	Manly-Warringah Sea Eagles	24	16	0	8	1	744	492	+252	34	Advance to finals series
5	Sydney Roosters	24	16	0	8	1	630	489	+141	34	Advance to finals series
6	Parramatta Eels	24	15	0	9	1	566	457	+109	32	Advance to finals series
7	Newcastle Knights	24	12	0	12	1	428	571	−143	26	Advance to finals series
8	Gold Coast Titans	24	10	0	14	1	580	583	−3	22	Advance to finals series
9	Cronulla-Sutherland Sharks	24	10	0	14	1	520	556	−36	22	
10	Canberra Raiders	24	10	0	14	1	481	578	−97	22	
11	St. George Illawarra Dragons	24	8	0	16	1	474	616	−142	18	
12	New Zealand Warriors	24	8	0	16	1	453	624	−171	18	
13	Wests Tigers	24	8	0	16	1	500	714	−214	18	
14	Brisbane Broncos	24	7	0	17	1	446	695	−249	16	
15	North Queensland Cowboys	24	7	0	17	1	460	748	−288	16	
16	Canterbury-Bankstown Bulldogs (W)	24	3	0	21	1	340	710	−370	8	

Updated to match(es) played on 5 September 2021. Source: 2021 NRL Ladder
(M) Minor premiers; (P) Premiers; (W) Wooden spoon

=== Ladder progression ===
- Numbers highlighted in green indicate that the team finished the round inside the top 8.
- Numbers highlighted in blue indicates the team finished first on the ladder in that round.
- Numbers highlighted in red indicates the team finished last place on the ladder in that round.
- Underlined numbers indicate that the team had a bye during that round.

	Team	1	2	3	4	5	6	7	8	9	10	11	12	13	14	15	16	17	18	19	20	21	22	23	24	25
1	Melbourne Storm	2	2	2	4	6	8	10	12	14	16	18	20	22	24	26	28	30	32	34	36	38	40	42	42	44
2	Penrith Panthers (P)	2	4	6	8	10	12	14	16	18	20	22	24	24	24	26	28	30	32	34	34	36	38	40	42	44
3	South Sydney Rabbitohs	0	2	4	6	8	10	12	14	14	16	16	18	20	22	24	26	28	30	32	34	36	38	38	40	42
4	Manly Warringah Sea Eagles	0	0	0	0	2	4	6	6	8	10	12	12	14	16	18	20	20	22	24	26	26	28	30	32	34
5	Sydney Roosters	2	4	4	6	8	8	10	12	12	14	14	16	18	20	20	20	22	24	26	28	28	30	32	32	34
6	Parramatta Eels	2	4	6	8	8	10	12	14	16	18	18	18	20	22	24	24	26	28	28	28	28	28	30	32	32
7	Newcastle Knights	2	4	4	4	4	6	6	6	8	8	8	10	10	10	12	14	16	16	16	18	20	22	24	26	26
8	Gold Coast Titans	0	2	4	4	6	6	6	6	8	8	10	10	10	10	10	12	14	14	16	18	20	20	20	20	22
9	Cronulla-Sutherland Sharks	2	2	2	4	4	4	4	4	4	4	6	8	10	12	14	14	16	16	18	18	18	18	20	22	22
10	Canberra Raiders	2	4	4	6	6	6	6	6	6	8	8	8	10	12	12	12	14	16	18	18	20	20	20	22	22
11	St. George Illawarra Dragons	0	2	4	6	8	8	8	8	10	10	10	10	12	12	14	16	18	18	18	18	18	18	18	18	18
12	New Zealand Warriors	2	2	4	4	4	6	6	8	8	8	10	10	12	12	12	12	12	12	12	14	16	18	18	18	18
13	Wests Tigers	0	0	2	2	2	2	2	4	4	6	6	8	10	10	10	10	12	14	14	14	16	18	18	18	18
14	Brisbane Broncos	0	0	2	2	2	2	2	4	4	4	6	6	6	6	6	8	10	10	10	12	12	12	14	14	16
15	North Queensland Cowboys	0	0	0	0	2	4	6	6	8	8	10	12	14	14	14	14	14	14	14	14	14	14	14	16	16
16	Canterbury-Bankstown Bulldogs	0	0	0	0	0	0	2	2	2	2	2	2	4	6	6	6	6	6	6	6	6	6	6	6	8

== Other teams ==
In addition to competing in the National Rugby League, the Panthers are also fielding semi-professional teams in the 2021 Jersey Flegg Cup (for players aged under 21) and the New South Wales Rugby League's The Knock-On Effect NSW Cup (NSW Cup).

== Representative honours ==
=== Domestic ===
Pos.	Player	Team	Call-up	Ref.
HB	Nathan Cleary	New South Wales	2021 State of Origin	
FE	Jarome Luai	New South Wales	2021 State of Origin	
LK	Isaah Yeo	New South Wales	2021 State of Origin	
WG	Brian To'o	New South Wales	2021 State of Origin	
SR	Liam Martin	New South Wales	2021 State of Origin	
HK	Apisai Koroisau	New South Wales	2021 State of Origin	
SR	Kurt Capewell	Queensland	2021 State of Origin	
