= Jarome Luai =

Samoa international rugby league footballer (born 1997)

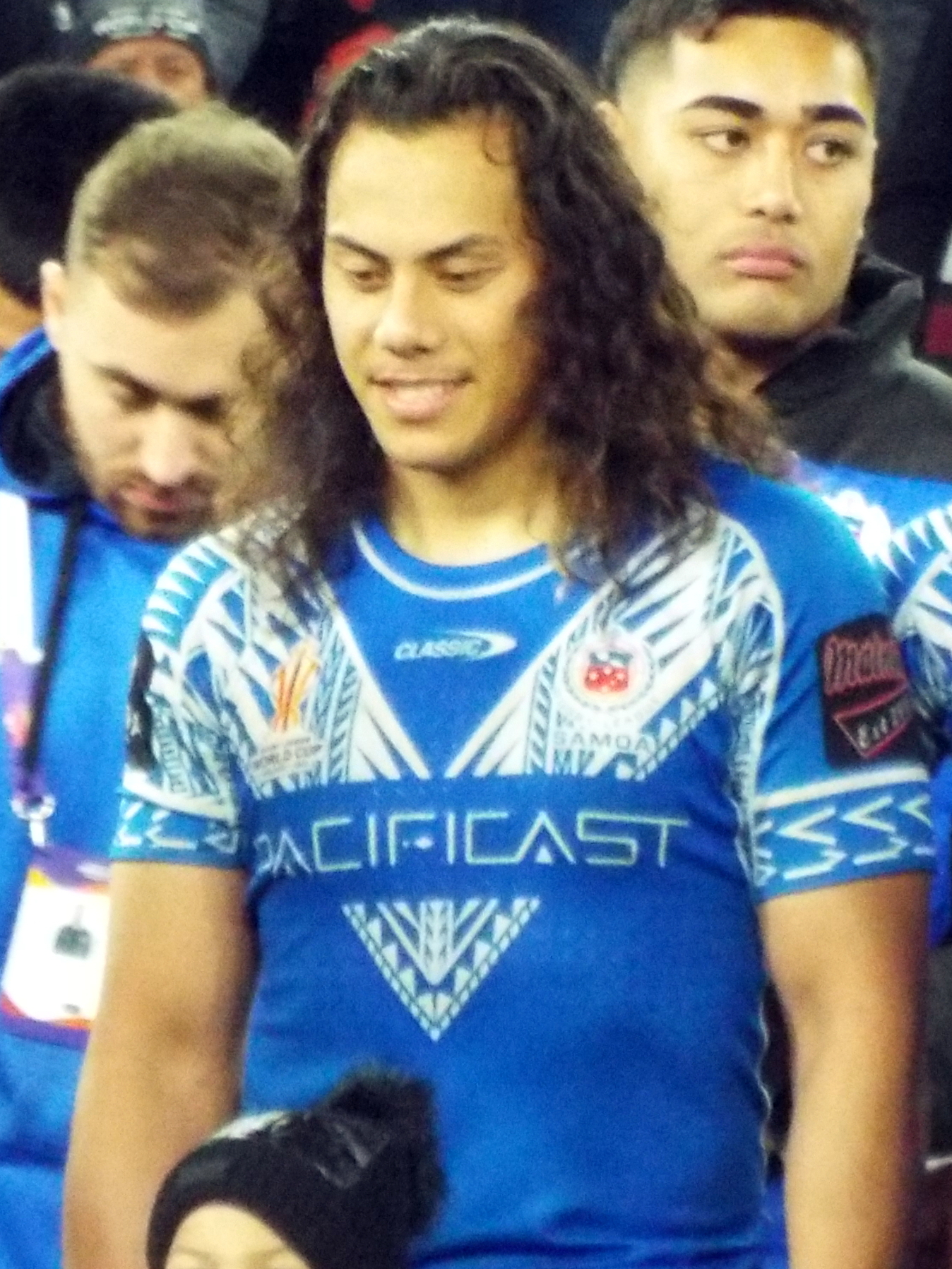

Personal information
- Born: 16 January 1997 (age 29) Sydney, New South Wales, Australia
- Height: 184 cm (6 ft 0 in)
- Weight: 90 kg (14 st 2 lb)

Playing information
- Position: Five-eighth, Halfback
Club
Years	Team	Pld	T	G	FG	P
2018–24	Penrith Panthers	131	25	8	0	116
2025–26	Wests Tigers	41	5	0	0	20
2027	Parramatta Eels	0	0	0	0	0
	Total	172	30	8	0	136
Representative
Years	Team	Pld	T	G	FG	P
2017–	Samoa	20	3	0	0	12
2019	Samoa 9s	4	1	1	0	6
2021	Māori All Stars	1	0	0	0	0
2021–25	New South Wales	12	2	0	0	8
- Source: As of 17 November 2026

Jarome Luai (born 16 January 1997) is a Samoa international rugby league footballer who plays as a five-eighth or halfback for the Parramatta Eels in the NRL (National Rugby League), He will join the PNG Chiefs in 2028.

He previously played for the Penrith Panthers, where he was a four time premiership winning player and the Wests Tigers; he has also represented and captained Samoa at test and 9's level, the NSW Blues in State of Origin and the Māori All Stars in the annual NRL All Stars match. He won the 2021, 2022, 2023 and 2024 NRL Grand Finals with the Penrith Panthers.

== Background ==
Luai was born in Sydney, New South Wales, Australia. His father is part Samoan while his mother is part Māori, he also has English ancestry. Luai's paternal grandparents were from Palauli, Samoa He played his junior rugby league for the St Marys Saints before being signed by the Penrith Panthers. He attended Patrician Brothers College Blacktown and was part of their renowned Rugby League program and culture.

== Playing career ==
=== Early career ===
Luai played games for the Penrith Panthers in the National Youth Competition between 2015 and 2017, scoring 13 tries and kicking 43 goals.

Luai spent part of the 2017 season playing for Penrith in the New South Wales Cup. Luai captained the Junior Kiwis in May 2017, scoring a try in their 46–22 loss to the Junior Kangaroos.

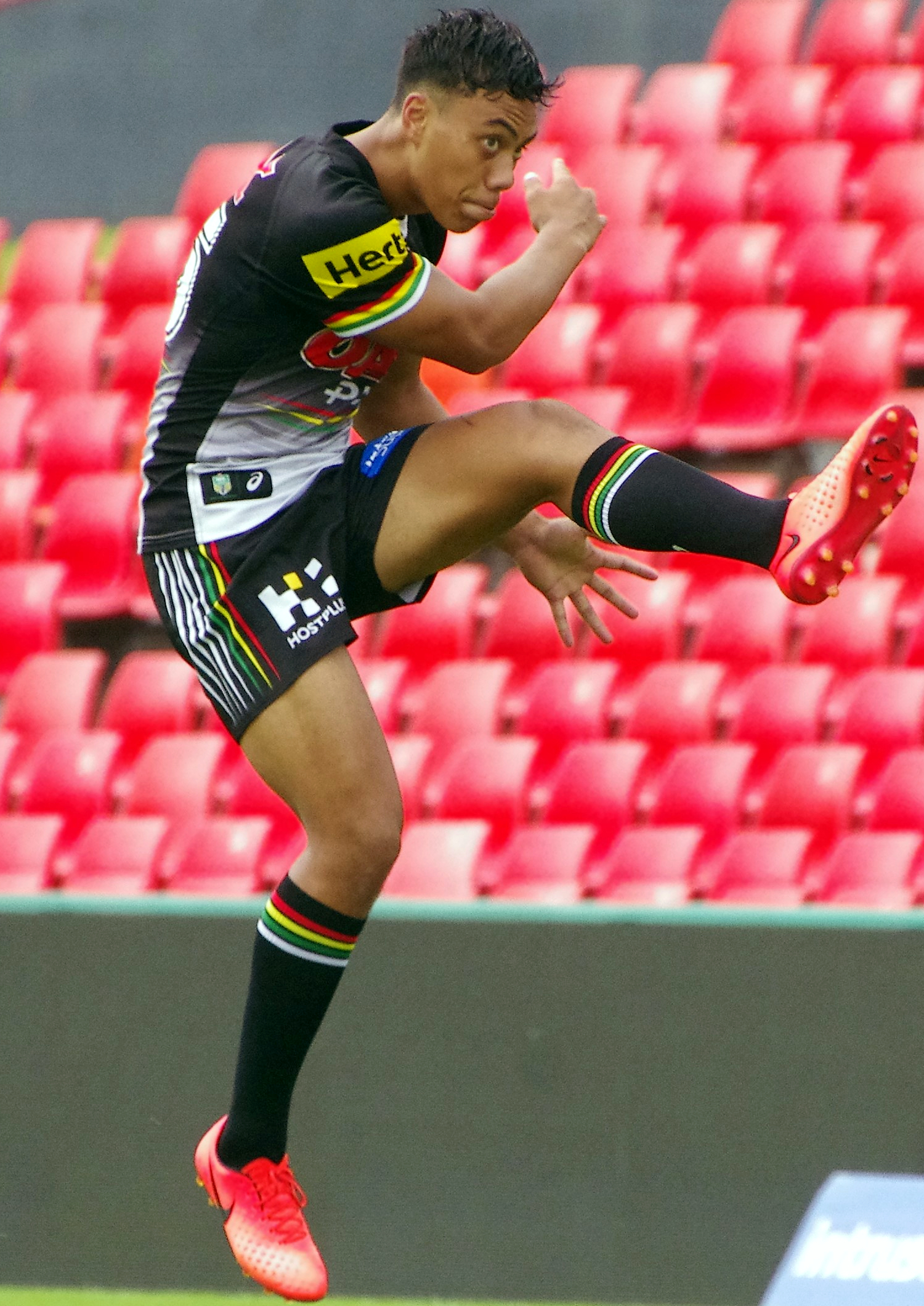
Luai playing for Penrith in 2017

=== 2017 ===
At the 2017 World Cup, Luai was the only member of the Samoan squad without any prior NRL experience. He speculated on his selection, saying "I think you'll find Tyrone May was in the squad originally but due to his injury there was a spot for me." Luai made his Test debut against Tonga on 4 November 2017.

=== 2018 ===
Following an injury to Nathan Cleary, Luai was named to make his NRL debut off the interchange bench in round 4 of the 2018 NRL season. However, he was cut from the line-up on gameday in favour of Wayde Egan, who was also on debut. Luai made his NRL debut in round 10 against the Newcastle Knights, playing for 26 minutes off the interchange bench. In round 17, Luai started at halfback in his second NRL match in the absence of Nathan Cleary and James Maloney due to State of Origin. His performance in the 36–4 win, which included two tries and multiple try assists, was heavily praised by the media.

=== 2019 ===
Luai made 13 appearances for Penrith in the 2019 NRL season as the club finished 10th on the table and missed the finals for the first time in four years. Luai also represented Samoa playing hooker in their 24-6 win over PNG. And played halfback in their 44-18 loss to Fiji.

=== 2020 ===
Luai had a breakout year for Penrith playing 23 games, scoring seven tries and bagging 23 try assists as Penrith claimed the Minor Premiership and reached the grand final against the Melbourne Storm, losing 26–20. Luai's form throughout the season was rewarded with a spot in the New South Wales State of Origin 27 man squad although he did not play in the three game series.

=== 2021 ===
On 30 May, he was selected by New South Wales for game 1 of the 2021 State of Origin series. Luai made his debut for New South Wales in game 1 where they defeated Queensland 50-6. On 27 June, Luai was a part of the NSW side which defeated Queensland 26-0, sealing the series for 2021. However, Luai was ruled out of game three of the series after he suffered a knee injury in Penrith's round 16 win over the Parramatta Eels.

Luai played a total of 25 games for Penrith in the 2021 NRL season including the club's grand final victory over South Sydney.

=== 2022 ===
In round 11 of the 2022 NRL season, Luai scored two tries for Penrith in a 32–12 victory over the Sydney Roosters.

Luai played all three State of Origin games as New South Wales lost the series 2-1. During the series, Luai verbally abused an unconscious Selwyn Cobbo, whist standing over him. The move prompted criticism, especially after Luai refused to apologise.

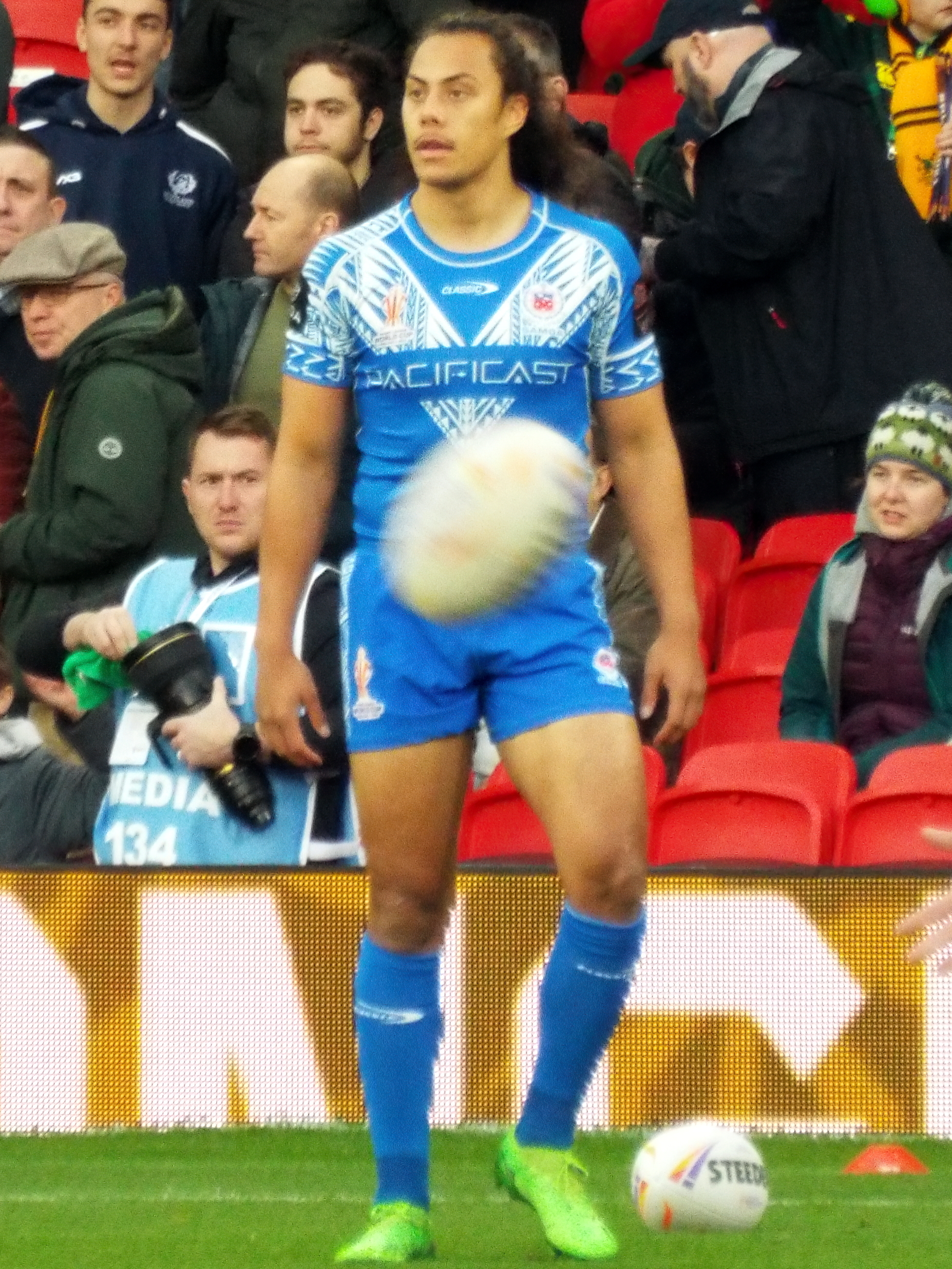
Luai warming up for Samoa in 2022

Luai won the 2022 Premiership with Penrith in a 28–12 win over Parramatta in the Grand Final. Following the grand final victory, Luai once again mocked the Parramatta club through social media posing for a photo with the caption "Daddy loves you". Luai had previously referred to Penrith as Parramatta's "Daddy" four days out from the match.

On 6 October, Luai mocked Parramatta player Ryan Matterson on social media after Matterson had mentioned Luai had gone unpunished in the grand final for allegedly kicking Isaiah Papali'i whilst Matterson was suspended for three games over a crusher tackle on Dylan Edwards. Luai posted the words "Cry 4 U" on Instagram accompanied by three crying emojis, and the chorus to R&B star Kennyon Brown’s song "Cry 4 You". This was followed by an Instagram story posted after the game, which contained a racial slur "nigga". The Panthers' management subsequently stated that the term was used affectionately, which drew further widespread criticism.

In October Luai was named in the Samoa squad for the 2021 Rugby League World Cup.

Luai played every match of the 2021 Rugby League World Cup including the final against Australia in which Samoa were comprehensively beaten 30-10.

In November he was named in the 2021 RLWC Team of the Tournament.

=== 2023 ===
On 18 February, Luai played in Penrith's 13-12 upset loss to St Helens RFC in the 2023 World Club Challenge.

On 22 May, Luai was selected by New South Wales for game one of the 2023 State of Origin series which was ultimately lost to the Queensland side. In game 2, Luai was sent off just before the end of the match for alleged fighting as New South Wales lost the match 32-6, and therefore the series. Following the game, Luai posted a message on his Instagram account which read “All you idiots have work tomorrow morning, We go again". Luai claimed it was in response to receiving death threats on social media following the match.

On 3 July, it was announced that Luai had not been selected by New South Wales for game 3 of the series.

The same month, Andrew Johns said, "I think Jarome is a back-up singer, he’s not a main playmaker. He’s not an organising half."

In round 26, Luai was taken from the field early in the first half after suffering a suspected dislocated shoulder during Penrith's 32-18 shock loss to Parramatta.

Luai played 22 matches for Penrith in the 2023 NRL season including the club's 26-24 victory over Brisbane in the 2023 NRL Grand Final as Penrith won their third straight premiership.

=== 2024 ===
On 3 January, Luai announced he signed a five-year deal with the Wests Tigers, commencing in 2025.

On 26 May, Luai was selected by New South Wales ahead of the 2024 State of Origin series.

Luai played in all three games as New South Wales won the series 2-1.

Luai played a total of 24 matches for Penrith in the 2024 NRL season. On 6 October, he won the 2024 NRL Grand Final with the Penrith club, the fourth consecutive premiership victory for the side. This was also his final appearance with the team prior to his move to the Wests Tigers.

=== 2025 ===
On 22 January. Luai was named alongside Apisai Koroisau as co-captain of the Wests Tigers for the 2025 season. Luai made his club debut for the Wests Tigers in round 1 of the 2025 NRL season against Newcastle which Wests lost 10-8.

In April, a number of senior players including Luai and Apisai Koroisau had asked team boss Shane Richardson about Lachlan Galvin and said that they did not want him in the team. Galvin had issues with being "second fiddle" to the four time premiership winning playmaker and that he had "no faith" in Benji Marshall's coaching. In May, Luai was not selected by New South Wales for game one of the 2025 State of Origin series with head coach Laurie Daley picking Mitchell Moses instead. In game two, Luai was called into the New South Wales team after Moses suffered a calf injury. Luai was retained for game three in the series which New South Wales would lose 24-12 and the series 2-1.

Luai played a total of 21 games for the Wests Tigers in the 2025 NRL season as the club finished 13th on the table.

=== 2026 ===
On 28 April, it was reported that Luai would depart the club at the end of the 2027 season to take up a deal with the newly-formed Papua New Guinea Chiefs.

In round 15 of the 2026 NRL season, Luai scored a hat-trick in the Wests Tigers' 36–28 victory over the Gold Coast. It was the last game at Leichhardt Oval before the ground was due to be re-developed.

On 11 July, Luai announced that he would leave the Wests Tigers upon conclusion of the season. On 14 July, the Parramatta Eels announced that Luai would be joining the team in 2027. The move was seen as a surprising one considering comments Luai had made about the Parramatta club in the past on social media. Luai played 20 games for the Wests Tigers in the 2026 NRL season as the club finished 15th on the table.

== Honours ==
Club

- 2020 Minor Premiership Winners
- 2021 NRL Grand Final Winners
- 2022 Minor Premiership Winners
- 2022 NRL Grand Final Winners
- 2023 Minor Premiership Winners
- 2023 NRL Grand Final Winners
- 2024 NRL Grand Final Winners

Representative

- 2021 State of Origin series Winners
- 2024 State of Origin series Winners

== Statistics ==
Year	Team	Games	Tries	Goals	Pts
2018	Penrith Panthers	4	2	8	24
2019	Penrith Panthers	13			
2020	Penrith Panthers	23	7		28
2021	Penrith Panthers	25	2		8
2022	Penrith Panthers	20	7		28
2023	Penrith Panthers	22	3		12
2024	Penrith Panthers	24	4		16
2025	Wests Tigers	21	1		4
2026	Wests Tigers	14	4		16
2027	Parramatta Eels				
	Totals	166	30	8	136
