= Viliame Kikau =

Fiji international rugby league footballer

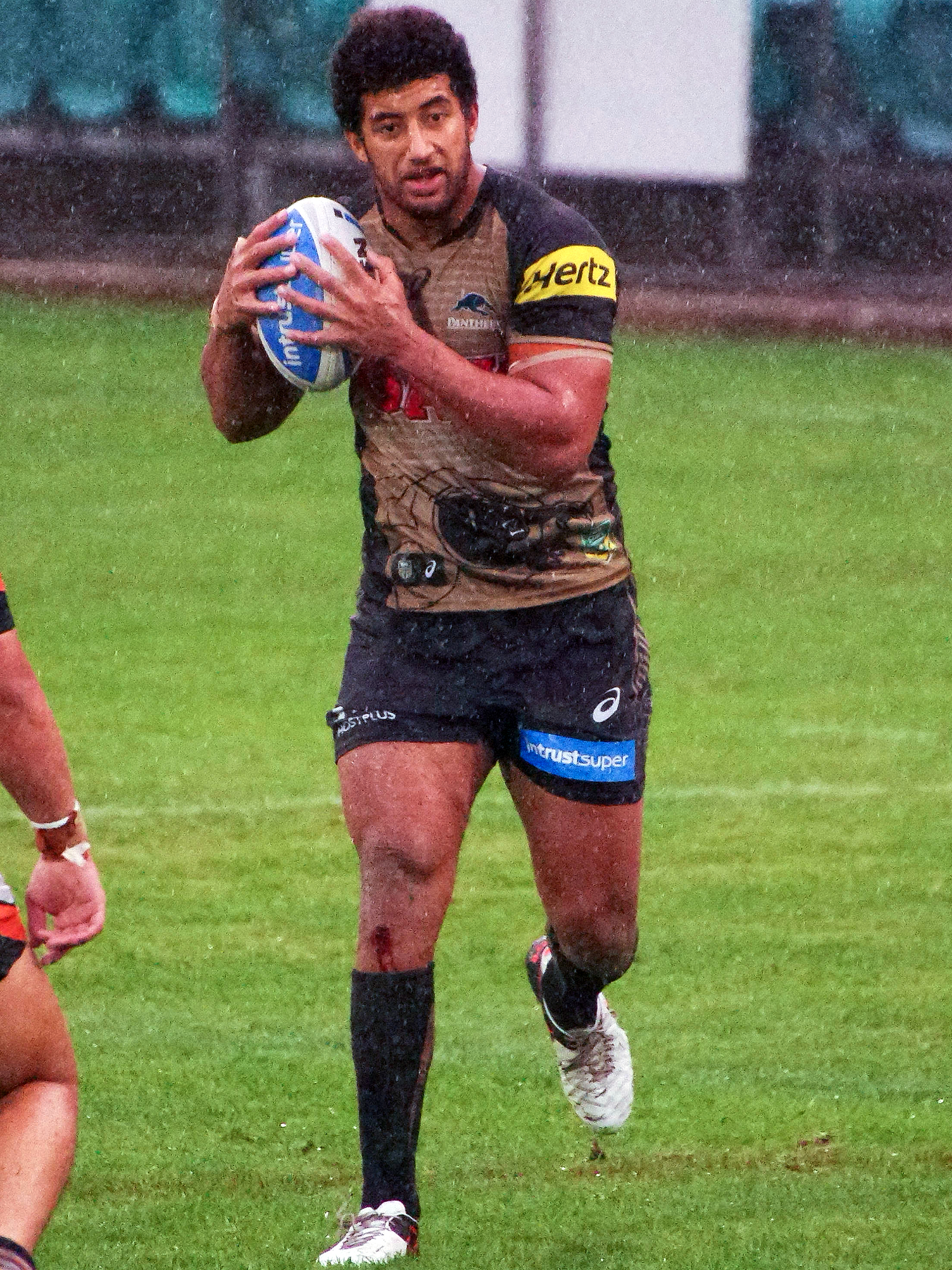

Personal information
- Full name: Viliame Gucake Kikau
- Born: 5 April 1995 (age 31) Nausori, Fiji
- Height: 195 cm (6 ft 5 in)
- Weight: 116 kg (18 st 4 lb)

Playing information
- Position: Second-row
Club
Years	Team	Pld	T	G	FG	P
2017–22	Penrith Panthers	123	38	0	0	152
2023–	Canterbury Bulldogs	69	14	0	0	54
	Total	192	52	0	0	206
Representative
Years	Team	Pld	T	G	FG	P
2015–	Fiji	18	11	0	0	44
2019	Fiji 9s	3	0	0	0	0
- Source: 3 September 2026

Viliame Kikau (born 5 April 1995) is a Fijian professional rugby league footballer who plays as a second-row forward for the Canterbury-Bankstown Bulldogs in the National Rugby League and Fiji at international level.

He previously played for the Penrith Panthers in the NRL, and is a dual NRL premiership winning player of 2021 and 2022.

== Background ==
Kikau was born in Nausori, Fiji, and grew up in the small island of Bau.

Kikau played rugby union in his youth and later earned placements at Queen Victoria School and Marist Brothers High School in Suva, where he played for their rugby union team and represented the Fiji Secondary Schools side against the Australian Schoolboys. In 2013, Kikau who never played rugby league was scouted by North Queensland recruiter Adrian Thomson in a schoolboy match and was one of three Fijian players who spent six weeks in Townsville.

Kikau was the only player to sign with the club and joined their Holden Cup team for the 2014 season. At the time, Kikau was also being scouted by a number of French rugby union clubs

== Early career ==
=== 2014 ===
In 2014, Kikau's first season of rugby league, he played 21 games for North Queensland's Holden Cup team, scoring 11 tries. A centre in his rugby union days, Kikau switched to prop after joining North Queensland.

=== 2015 ===
In 2015, Kikau played in a pre-season trial game with North Queensland's first grade team. He scored a try in the sides 24–12 victory over the Townsville Blackhawks.

On 2 May 2015, Kikau made his international debut for Fiji against Papua New Guinea in the Melanesian Cup match, playing off the interchange bench in the 22–10 win at Robina Stadium. On 10 June 2015, Kikau signed a two-year contract with the Penrith Panthers. On 14 September 2015, Kikau was named at prop in the 2015 NYC Team of the Year, finishing his Holden Cup career with the North Queensland club with 32 tries from 42 matches.

=== 2016 ===
Kikau spent 2016 playing in Penrith's NSW Cup team. On 8 October 2016, he played for Fiji against Samoa, starting at second-row in the 20–18 victory in Apia, Samoa.

== Playing career ==
=== 2017 ===
In Round 2, Kikau made his NRL debut for the Penrith Panthers against the Wests Tigers, playing off the interchange bench and scoring a try in the 36–2 win at Campbelltown Stadium. On 15 April, he re-signed with the Penrith Panthers to the end of the 2019 NRL season.

On 6 May, Kikau played for Fiji against Tonga, starting at second-row and scoring a try in the 26–24 loss at Campbelltown Stadium. Kikau would play most of the year playing in Penrith's NSW cup team where they won the NSW Intrust Super premiership against the Wyong Roos 20–12. A week later on 1 October, Kikau played in the NRL State Championship match against QLD Cup winners the Papua New Guinea Hunters starting at second-row and scoring a try in the 42–18 boilover win. Kikau finished his debut year in the NRL with 9 matches and 1 try for the Panthers in the NRL. On 7 October, he was named in the 24-man squad for Fiji for the 2017 Rugby League World Cup. Kikau had an outstanding tournament for Fiji playing in all of their 5 matches and scoring 3 tries and was rewarded with him being named in the World Cup Team of the Tournament.

=== 2018 ===
After his impressive World Cup campaign, Kikau cemented a permanent place in Penrith's top 17. He made 25 appearances in the 2018 NRL season as the club finished 5th and reached the elimination final against Cronulla-Sutherland before losing 21–20.

=== 2019 ===
In round 23 of the 2019 NRL season, Kikau played his 50th NRL game for Penrith in their 24–10 defeat by the North Queensland Cowboys at 1300Smiles stadium. Kikau made a total of 18 appearances for Penrith in the 2019 NRL season as the club finished 10th on the table and missed out on the finals for the first time since 2015.

=== 2020 ===
Kikau played 19 games for Penrith in the 2020 NRL season as the club won the Minor Premiership. Kikau played in the 2020 NRL Grand Final for Penrith in which they lost 26–20 against Melbourne.

=== 2021 ===
On 27 September, Kikau was named Dally M Second Rower of the year alongside Parramatta's Isaiah Papali'i.

Kikau played a total of 27 games for Penrith in the 2021 NRL season including the club's 2021 NRL Grand Final victory over South Sydney. Kikau scored a second half try in the final but was disallowed on review due to the pass from Nathan Cleary being ruled forward.

Following Penrith's grand final victory, an intoxicated Kikau went on Instagram and mocked South Sydney by singing their club song. Penrith teammate Tyrone May then appeared on the video and said "I don't give a fuck. Fuck every motherfucker, nigger".

In November, an image of Kikau was leaked from a security camera within Canterbury Leagues Club showing Kikau posting in a Canterbury shirt along with head coach Trent Barrett and head of football Phil Gould. Kikau then took to social media and explained the situation saying "Today photos were taken of me wearing another club's colours," Kikau wrote. "Me and my manager were told the photos wouldn't become public until the appropriate time. I am very disappointed that didn't happen and regret the upset it has caused. I want the Panthers fans to know I remain fully committed to our club and the team for the upcoming season. I can't wait to celebrate our premiership with you".

=== 2022 ===
Kikau played 25 games throughout the 2022 NRL season for Penrith including the club's 2022 NRL Grand Final victory over Parramatta. In the second group stage match of the 2021 Rugby League World Cup, Kikau scored two tries for Fiji in their 60–4 victory over Italy.

=== 2023 ===
In round 1 of the 2023 NRL season, Kikau made his club debut for Canterbury in their 31–6 loss against Manly at Brookvale Oval. On 12 April, it was reported that Kikau had suffered a pectoral injury at training and would be ruled out for 8–10 weeks. Kikau played a total of nine games for Canterbury in the 2023 NRL season as the club finished 15th on the table.

=== 2024 ===
Kikau played 23 games for Canterbury in the 2024 NRL season as the club qualified for the finals finishing 6th. This was the first time in eight years that Canterbury had managed this. Kikau played in the club's elimination final loss against Manly.

=== 2025 ===
In round 2 of the 2025 NRL season, Kikau suffered an MCL injury in Canterbury's 40–24 victory over the Gold Coast Titans and was ruled out from playing for at least a month. Kikau played 22 games for Canterbury in the 2025 NRL season as the club finished third and qualified for the finals. Canterbury would be eliminated from the finals in straight sets. On 9 December 2025, the Bulldogs announced that Kikau had extended his contract until the end of 2028.

=== 2026 ===
Kikau played 15 matches for Canterbury in the 2026 NRL season as the club finished 12th on the table.

== Statistics ==
Year	Team	Games	Tries	Pts
2017	Penrith Panthers	9	1	4
2018	Penrith Panthers	25	5	20
2019	Penrith Panthers	18	7	28
2020	Penrith Panthers	19	7	28
2021	Penrith Panthers	27	9	36
2022	Penrith Panthers	25	9	36
2023	Canterbury-Bankstown Bulldogs	9	1	4
2024	Canterbury-Bankstown Bulldogs	23	5	20
2025	Canterbury-Bankstown Bulldogs	22	6	24
2026	Canterbury-Bankstown Bulldogs	4		
	Totals	181	50	200
