= Taylan May =

Samoa rugby league footballer (born 2001)

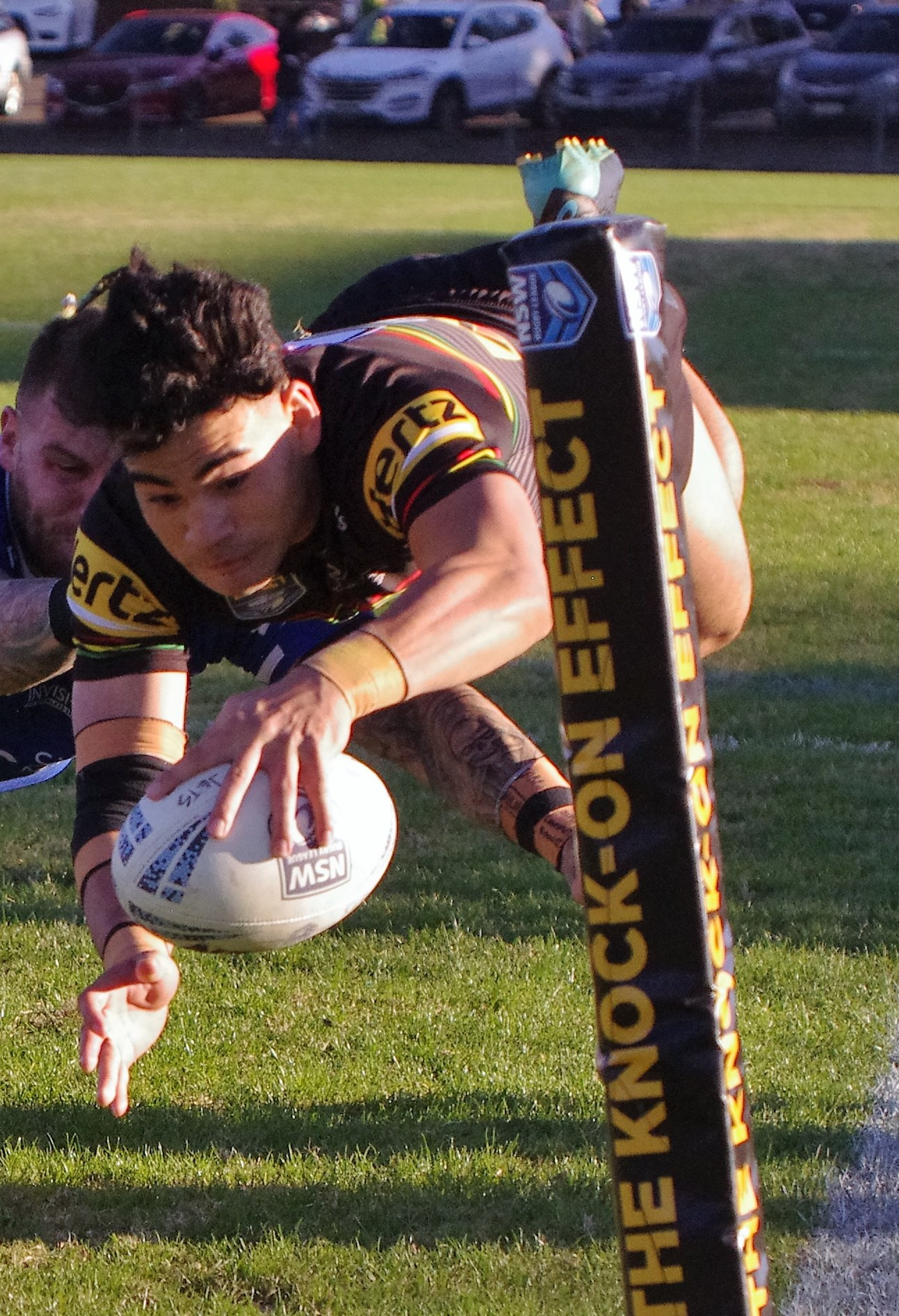

Personal information
- Full name: Taylan May
- Born: 19 August 2001 (age 25) Blacktown, New South Wales, Australia
- Height: 181 cm (5 ft 11 in)
- Weight: 97 kg (15 st 4 lb)

Playing information
- Position: Wing, Centre
Club
Years	Team	Pld	T	G	FG	P
2021–24	Penrith Panthers	30	17	0	0	68
2025–	Wests Tigers	16	10	0	0	40
	Total	46	27	0	0	108
Representative
Years	Team	Pld	T	G	FG	P
2022	Samoa	5	6	0	0	24
- Source: As of 28 June 2026
- Relatives: Terrell May (brother); Tyrone May (brother)

Taylan May (born 19 August 2001) is a Samoa international rugby league footballer. May plays for the Wests Tigers in the National Rugby League.

== Background ==
He played junior rugby league for the Minchinbury Jets.

== Playing career ==
=== 2021 ===
In round 21 of the 2021 NRL season, May made his debut for Penrith against the Sydney Roosters.

=== 2022 ===
In round 3 of the 2022 NRL season, May scored a hat-trick in Penrith's 38–20 victory over Newcastle.

The following round against South Sydney in the Grand Final rematch, he scored two tries in Penrith's 26–16 win. In the 2022 Qualifying Final, May was sent to the sin bin for a dangerous high tackle and later suffered a hamstring injury in Penrith's 27–8 victory over Parramatta. May missed Penrith's 2022 NRL Grand Final victory over Parramatta due to injury.

In October May was named in the Samoa squad for the 2021 Rugby League World Cup. In the third group stage match at the 2021 Rugby League World Cup, May scored four tries for Samoa in their 62–4 victory over France.

=== 2023 ===
On 18 February, May played in Penrith's 13–12 upset loss to St Helens RFC in the 2023 World Club Challenge. On 20 February, it was confirmed that May would miss the entire 2023 NRL season after tearing his ACL during Penrith's World Club Challenge loss.

=== 2024 ===
On 24 February, May played in Penrith's 2024 World Club Challenge final loss against Wigan. On 11 June, May was issued a show cause notice to attend the clubs board to plead his case. On 5 July, May was released from his playing contract with Penrith and would seek opportunities elsewhere.

=== 2025 ===
On 10 June. the Wests Tigers announced that they had signed May on a train and trial deal for the rest of the season. In round 20 of the 2025 NRL season, May made his club debut for the Wests Tigers in their 21–20 victory over the Gold Coast where he scored a try. On 9 September, May had at first rejected an initial three-year deal with the Wests Tigers. Hours later, the Wests Tigers announced that May had re-signed with the club on a two-year deal. May played seven matches for the Wests Tigers in the 2025 NRL season as the club finished 13th on the table.

=== 2026 ===
On 1 May, the Wests Tigers announced that May had re-signed with the club until the end of 2030. May was limited to just nine games for the Wests Tigers in the 2026 NRL season as the club finished 15th on the table.

== Controversies ==
On 6 April 2022, May was charged by the Queensland Police Service with assault occasioning bodily harm. The charge relates to an incident that occurred in November 2021, while May was on leave following the 2021 NRL season.

On 31 August 2022, May was found guilty of assaulting a man which occurred following Penrith's 2021 NRL Grand Final victory. May was ordered to pay a $1000 fine and no criminal conviction was recorded.

On 7 September, May was suspended for two matches by the NRL and fined, however May's suspension was backdated until the start of the 2023 NRL season which meant he was allowed to participate in the 2022 finals series.

On 16 April 2024, it was reported that May had been placed under investigation by the NRL after he filmed himself as the passenger of a vehicle which was driving 96kmh in a 50kmh residential zone. May subsequently deleted his social media over the incident in an attempt to hide the video but it was revealed it had already been leaked to the media.

On 18 May 2024, it was revealed that May had been arrested by police and charged with assault occasioning actual bodily harm (DV), and two counts of stalk/intimidate intend fear physical etc. harm, in a case of domestic violence. It was alleged that the offence had occurred a month prior. The Penrith club released a statement saying “Penrith Panthers are aware of an alleged incident regarding player Taylan May, which has resulted in police charges, “As this is a legal matter, the club will make no further comment at this stage". On 23 May 2024, he was prevented from playing indefinitely by NRL through their no-fault stand down policy.

On 24 August 2024, it was revealed that May had been arrested after breaching the AVO order.

On 10 March 2025, the charges against May had been withdrawn in court.

== Personal life ==
He is the brother of rugby league players Tyrone May and Terrell May. He plays under the name 'Tiny May' for Samoa. He is 1–0 in his professional boxing career, fighting on the undercard of Paul Gallen against Darcy Lussick, beating New Zealand Warriors hooker Freddy Lussick.
