= Mitch Kenny =

Australian rugby league footballer

Personal information
- Full name: Mitchell Kenny
- Born: 15 January 1998 (age 28) Sydney, New South Wales, Australia
- Height: 183 cm (6 ft 0 in)
- Weight: 90 kg (14 st 2 lb)

Playing information
- Position: Hooker
Club
Years	Team	Pld	T	G	FG	P
2019–	Penrith Panthers	138	4	0	0	16
- Source: As of 27 September 2026

Mitchell Kenny (born 15 January 1998) is an Australian professional rugby league footballer who plays as a hooker for the Penrith Panthers in the NRL.

He is a NRL premiership winning player of 2022, 2023 and 2024.

== Early life ==
Born in Sydney, New South Wales, Kenny grew up in the suburb of McGraths Hill and was educated at Arndell Anglican College, Oakville.

Kenny played junior rugby league for Windsor Wolves before being selected for the Penrith Panthers under-17 development squad.

Kenny also played SG Ball with Penrith, winning various matches throughout that year, including the national under-18's championship. He started to move his way up through the ranks of Penrith, playing with the under-20s team for two years and then moving onto their Canterbury Cup NSW squad.

== Career ==
=== 2019 ===
Kenny made his first grade debut in round 11 of the 2019 NRL season for Penrith in their 16–10 victory over the Parramatta Eels at the new Western Sydney Stadium.

=== 2020 ===
Kenny was limited to only six games for Penrith in the 2020 NRL season and missed on playing in the clubs Grand Final loss to the Melbourne Storm.

=== 2021 ===
Kenny played 18 games for Penrith in the 2021 NRL season but missed out on playing in Penrith's 2021 NRL Grand Final victory over South Sydney due to an injury he sustained during the clubs victory over the Parramatta Eels in the semi-final.

=== 2022 ===
Ahead of the 2022 NRL season, Kenny re-signed with the Penrith Panthers until the end of the 2024 season. During round 4 of the 2022 season, he scored his first NRL try in Penrith's 32–12 victory over the Canterbury-Bankstown Bulldogs at Western Sydney Stadium. Kenny played 24 games for Penrith throughout the season including the 2022 NRL Grand Final victory over Parramatta.

=== 2023 ===
On 18 February, Kenny played in Penrith's 13–12 upset loss to St Helens RFC in the 2023 World Club Challenge. In round 4 of the 2023 NRL season, Kenny was sent to the sin bin during golden point extra-time against Parramatta due to a dangerous high tackle on Waqa Blake. Parramatta would kick a field goal from the resulting penalty to win 17–16. Kenny played 23 games for Penrith in the 2023 NRL season including the clubs 26–24 victory over Brisbane in the 2023 NRL Grand Final as Penrith won their third straight premiership. Kenny scored the opening try of the final. On 26 December, Kenny was placed under investigation by the NRL and Penrith for allegedly posting a picture to his instagram account with the caption "couple Boxing Day lines have got me in trouble". Kenny later took the picture down and posted a caption which read "Happy new year guys. Enjoy... and ignore trolls who grabbed my phone,". The NRL later released a statement saying "The NRL is aware of the matter and will be liaising with the club,".

=== 2024 ===
On 8 February, Kenny was handed with a breach notice by the NRL for his Instagram post dating back to December 2023. The NRL released a statement which read “The National Rugby League (NRL) today issued Penrith Panthers player Mitch Kenny with a Breach Notice alleging a breach of the NRL Code of Conduct following an NRL Integrity Unit investigation into a social media post in December, 2023,” the NRL’s statement read. It is alleged Kenny engaged in conduct which has brought the game and his Club into disrepute. Kenny has five business days to respond to the Breach Notice". On 24 February, Kenny played in Penrith's 2024 World Club Challenge final loss against Wigan. Kenny played a total of 24 matches for Penrith in the 2024 NRL season including the clubs 14-6 grand final victory over Melbourne.

=== 2025 ===
Kenny played a total of 22 games for Penrith in the 2025 NRL season as the club finished 7th on the table. Kenny played in Penrith's narrow preliminary final loss against Brisbane.

=== 2026 ===
In round 7 of the 2026 NRL season, Kenny suffered a fractured fibula and syndesmosis injury in the Panthers' narrow win over the Dolphins. He was subsequently ruled out for 8-12 weeks. On 15 July, it was announced by the Penrith Panthers that Kenny had signed a contract extension, keeping him at the club till the end of the 2031 season.

== Statistics ==
Stats correct as of the end of the 2025 season

Year	Team	Games	Tries	Pts
2019	Penrith Panthers	12		
2020	Penrith Panthers	6		
2021	Penrith Panthers	18		
2022	Penrith Panthers	24	1	4
2023	Penrith Panthers	23	1	4
2024	Penrith Panthers	24	2	8
2025	Penrith Panthers	22		
2026	Penrith Panthers	5		
	Totals	134	4	16
