= Spencer Leniu =

Samoan international rugby league footballer

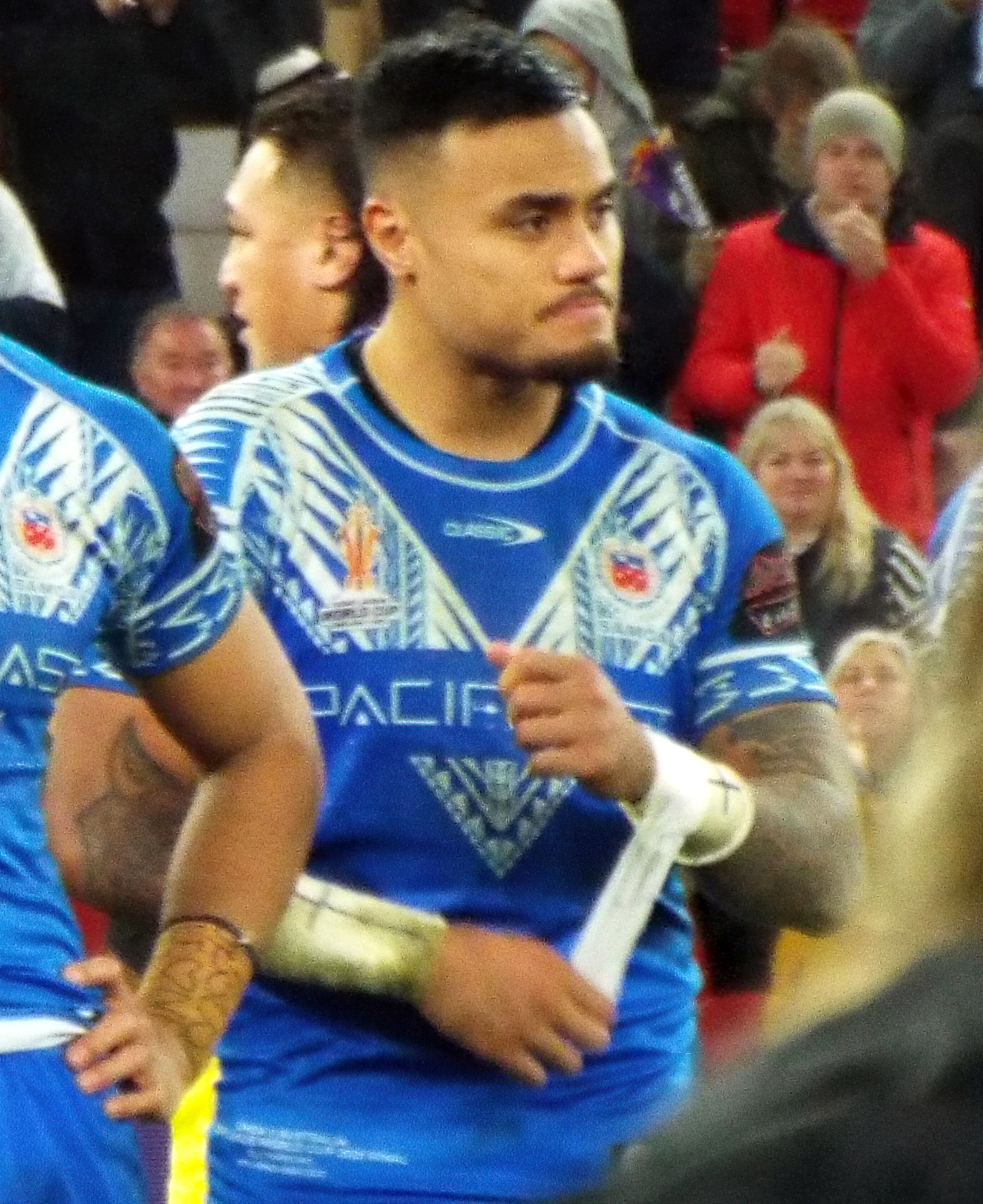

Personal information
- Born: 8 September 2000 (age 26) Auckland, New Zealand
- Height: 183 cm (6 ft 0 in)
- Weight: 110 kg (17 st 5 lb)

Playing information
- Position: Prop
Club
Years	Team	Pld	T	G	FG	P
2019–23	Penrith Panthers	83	8	0	0	32
2024–26	Sydney Roosters	60	2	0	0	8
2027–	Parramatta Eels	0	0	0	0	8
	Total	143	10	0	0	48
Representative
Years	Team	Pld	T	G	FG	P
2022–	Samoa	11	1	0	0	4
2024–25	New South Wales	6	0	0	0	0
- Source: As of 15 November 2026

Spencer Leniu (born 8 September 2000) is a Samoa international rugby league footballer who plays as a prop for the Parramatta Eels in the National Rugby League (NRL).

== Background ==
Of Samoan descent, Leniu was born in Auckland, New Zealand, and grew up in Western Sydney. He played for the Minchinbury Jets in the Penrith District Junior Rugby League.

== Career ==
=== 2019 ===
Leniu made his first grade debut for Penrith against the Cronulla-Sutherland Sharks in round 21 of the 2019 NRL season which ended in a 26–20 victory for Penrith at Panthers Stadium.

=== 2020 ===
Leniu played 12 games for Penrith in the 2020 NRL season but did not feature in the clubs finals campaign or the 2020 NRL Grand Final loss to Melbourne.

=== 2021 ===
Leniu played a total of 19 games for Penrith in the 2021 NRL season including the club's 2021 NRL Grand Final victory over South Sydney.

=== 2022 ===
Leniu played 25 games for Penrith in the 2022 NRL season including the clubs 2022 NRL Grand Final victory over Parramatta.

In October Leniu was named in the Samoa squad for the 2021 Rugby League World Cup.

=== 2023 ===
On 18 February, Leniu played in Penrith's 13–12 upset loss to St Helens RFC in the 2023 World Club Challenge. On February, Leniu announced he will join Sydney Roosters from 2024 onwards. Leniu was selected as 19th man in the NSW Blues State of Origin squad for Game 3. Leniu played 21 games for Penrith in the 2023 NRL season including the clubs 26–24 victory over Brisbane in the 2023 NRL Grand Final as Penrith won their third straight premiership.

=== 2024 ===
In round 1 of the 2024 NRL season, Leniu was placed on report during the Sydney Roosters victory over Brisbane at the Allegiant Stadium in Las Vegas. It was alleged that Leniu had called Brisbane player Ezra Mam a "monkey". The incident was immediately reported to the NRL judiciary. Leniu pleaded guilty to a contrary conduct charge and was suspended for eight games at the sentencing hearing on 11 March. Leniu was asked about the racial vilification aimed at AFL legend Adam Goodes which ended his career, but the Sydney Roosters prop claimed he didn't know who Goodes was.

On 21 May, the Sydney Roosters hit back at claims that Leniu had been taking illegal substances on a live stream along with fellow players Brandon Smith, Zach Dockar-Clay, Naufahu Whyte and Terrell May. The club released a statement which read "The Sydney Roosters have been made aware of a small clip from a longer live stream that some on social media have claimed identifies behaviour that breaches NRL rules. "The clip reveals no use of illicit substances or any other breach of NRL rules, however some see fit to make that grossly distorted and clearly damaging claim".

On 26 May, Leniu was one of the surprise selections by New South Wales ahead of the 2024 State of Origin series. He played in all 3 games of the series off the bench. Leniu played 17 matches for the Sydney Roosters in the 2024 NRL season. He played in all three finals matches for the club as they were defeated in the preliminary final by Melbourne.

=== 2025 ===
Early in the 2025 NRL season, Spencer found himself in hot water again after accusing former NRL player Johnathan Thurston of being a "f*cking cu*t" and "remember no means no". Leniu later denied approaching Thurston and stated that Thurston himself came over to him. Leniu stated that he didn't want to talk with Thurston and he came over to him twice to speak, Leniu further said "Don't be two face. Hate me lad I'm eestwa (sweet) with that. But don't be fake". Leniu escaped sanction due to Thurston or Channel 9 not making a formal complaint. In May, Leniu was selected by New South Wales for the 2025 State of Origin series. He played in all three games as NSW lost the series 2–1. Leniu played 20 games for the Sydney Roosters in the 2025 NRL season as the club finished 8th on the table and qualified for the finals. Leniu played in the clubs elimination final loss against Cronulla.

=== 2026 ===
Leniu played 23 games for the Sydney Roosters in the 2026 NRL season including the clubs 19-18 grand final victory over Newcastle. On 8 October, just days after winning his fourth premiership, Parramatta announced that Leniu had signed a four-year deal with the club starting in 2027.

== Statistics ==
- † Denotes premiership winning year (played in GF)

Year	Team	Games	Tries	Pts
2019	Penrith Panthers	5		
2020	Penrith Panthers	12		
2021 †	Penrith Panthers	20	1	4
2022 †	Penrith Panthers	25	6	24
2023 †	Penrith Panthers	21	1	4
2024	Sydney Roosters	17	1	4
2025	Sydney Roosters	20	1	4
2026 †	Sydney Roosters	22		
2027	Parramatta Eels			
	Totals	143	10	40
