= 2021 NRL Grand Final =

NRL Grand Final

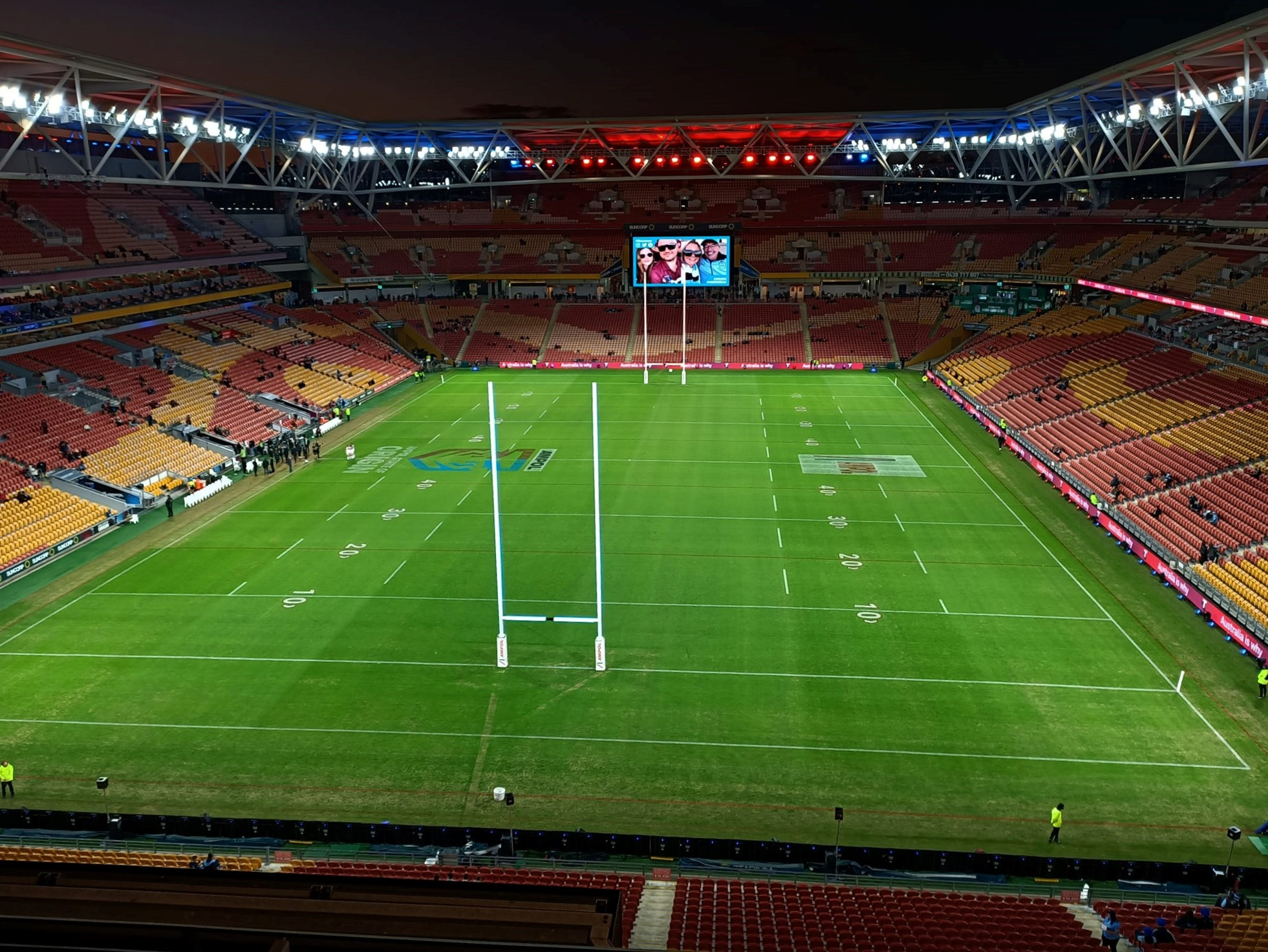
- Suncorp Stadium in Brisbane, which hosted the game due to COVID-19 measures in Sydney

Penrith Panthers	South Sydney Rabbitohs
14	12
	1	2	Total
PEN	8	6	14
SOU	6	6	12
- Date: 3 October 2021
- Stadium: Suncorp Stadium, Brisbane
- Location: Brisbane, Queensland, Australia
- Clive Churchill Medal: Nathan Cleary (PEN)
- National anthem: Kate Miller-Heidke
- Pre-Match Entertainment: Kate Miller-Heidke, Ian Moss, The Stafford Brothers, Timmy Trumpet, William Barton
- Referees: Gerard Sutton, Todd Smith (Touch Judge); David Munro (Touch Judge)
- Attendance: 39,322

Broadcast partners
- Broadcasters: Nine Network (Live) Fox League (Delayed)
- Commentators: Ray Warren; Phil Gould; Andrew Johns; Peter Sterling; Brad Fittler

The 2021 NRL Grand Final was the conclusive and premiership-deciding game of the 2021 National Rugby League season in Australia. It was contested between the Penrith Panthers and the South Sydney Rabbitohs on Sunday 3 October at Suncorp Stadium in Brisbane. Penrith won the match 14–12 to claim their third premiership title, and their first since 2003. Penrith co-captain and halfback Nathan Cleary was awarded the Clive Churchill Medal as the official man of the match.

The event was held in Brisbane for the first time in the competition's history due to an ongoing COVID-19 lockdown in New South Wales which prompted the NRL to relocate it from Stadium Australia in Sydney, where every NRL Grand Final since 1999 had been hosted. Due to COVID-19 restrictions, the match was attended by only 39,322 spectators because the Queensland Government limited Suncorp Stadium to seventy-five percent of its maximum capacity.

The match was preceded by the 2021 Queensland Cup preliminary finals and broadcast live throughout Australia by the Nine Network, with pre-match and half-time entertainment headlined by Kate Miller-Heidke, Ian Moss, The Stafford Brothers, Timmy Trumpet, William Barton and a forty-piece Queensland orchestra.

This was the last game to be commentated by long-time announcer Ray Warren.

== Background ==
This was the first ever NRL Grand Final between the Penrith Panthers and the South Sydney Rabbitohs, and the first time since 2014 that the Grand Final featured two Sydney-based clubs. The Penrith side aimed for a third premiership, after defeating Canberra Raiders in 1991 and Sydney Roosters in 2003. It was also Ivan Cleary's third Grand Final appearance as a coach, after losing with the New Zealand Warriors against Manly Sea Eagles in 2011, and losing with the Penrith side against Melbourne Storm in 2020. Meanwhile, the Rabbitohs were aiming for their 22nd premiership victory; their most recent being against Canterbury-Bankstown Bulldogs in 2014. It was also Wayne Bennett's tenth Grand Final appearance as a coach after winning seven of the previous nine.

After finishing as minor premiers and runners-up in 2020, the Panthers finished the 2021 regular season in second place after 21 wins and three losses.

South Sydney finished third after 30 wins and four losses. During the regular season, the Rabbitohs scored 775 points, the fourth highest of all time in competition history. Despite this, they conceded 50 points in a game twice during the home and away season, to the Panthers and the Melbourne Storm, dampening their premiership aspirations with no side ever winning the premiership after doing so. In the Rabbitohs' 54–12 victory over the Roosters in round 24, fullback Latrell Mitchell was suspended for six matches for reckless high contact on Joseph Manu. Rookie Blake Taaffe replaced him the next week, playing just his fourth NRL match at the time.

During the regular season, the two teams faced each other twice. In round 11, the Panthers defeated the Rabbitohs 56–12 at Apex Oval. In round 23, the Panthers won 25–12 at Suncorp Stadium. However, in a major upset in the first week of the finals Series, South Sydney defeated Penrith 16–10 at Queensland Country Bank Stadium in the Qualifying Final and advanced straight to the Preliminary Finals two weeks later, beating Manly Warringah Sea Eagles 36–16 at Suncorp Stadium to advance to the Grand Final. After losing to Souths, Penrith defeated Parramatta Eels 8–6 in the Semi-Finals one week later at BB Print Stadium. In what was a rematch of the previous year's grand final, Penrith defeated minor premiers Melbourne Storm 10–6 in the Preliminary Final at Suncorp Stadium to advance to the Grand Final.

Prior to the match, Michael McGowan writing for the Guardian Australia explained how South Sydney represents rugby league's blue collar past, and how Penrith better embody it in 2021. Prior to the creation of the NRL in 1998, South Sydney had won 20 premierships, with their first coming in the inaugural 1908 season, and final coming in 1971. Souths had only won one premiership during the NRL-era in the 2014 NRL Grand Final. While prior to this match, Penrith had won a total of two premierships, with their first coming in 1991, and second coming in 2003. This Grand Final marked the start of four consecutive Grand Final victories for Penrith after losing in 2020. The Penrith junior system is also widely regarded to produce the best talent in the modern game, and the team is widely regarded to have the best homegrown talent in the modern game due to the population demographics of their geographical district. This trend of the best rugby league talent being considered to be from heavily blue collar areas reflects the widely held belief that rugby league has working class roots.

== Pre-match ==
=== Broadcasting ===
The match was broadcast live on the Nine Network and delayed on Fox League in Australia and Sky Sport in New Zealand. Radio broadcasters included ABC, Triple M, 2GB, SEN and Koori Radio.

=== Officiating ===
Gerard Sutton was appointed to his seventh NRL Grand Final.

=== Attendance ===
Due to COVID-19 restrictions, the match was attended by only 39,322 spectators because the Queensland Government limited Suncorp Stadium to seventy-five percent of its maximum capacity.

== Teams ==
Penrith Panthers	Position	South Sydney Rabbitohs
Dylan Edwards	Fullback	Blake Taaffe
Stephen Crichton	Wing	Alex Johnston
Paul Momirovski	Centre	Dane Gagai
Matt Burton	Centre	Campbell Graham
Brian To'o	Wing	Jaxson Paulo
Jarome Luai	Five-eighth	Cody Walker
Nathan Cleary (c)	Halfback	Adam Reynolds (c)
Moses Leota	Prop	Mark Nicholls
Apisai Koroisau	Hooker	Damien Cook
James Fisher-Harris	Prop	Tevita Tatola
Liam Martin	2nd Row	Keaon Koloamatangi
Kurt Capewell	2nd Row	Jaydn Su'A
Isaah Yeo (c)	Lock	Cameron Murray
Viliame Kikau	Interchange	Benji Marshall
Tyrone May	Interchange	Jacob Host
Scott Sorensen	Interchange	Tom Burgess
Spencer Leniu	Interchange	Jai Arrow
Ivan Cleary	Coach	Wayne Bennett

Matt Burton, Spencer Leniu, Paul Momirovski and Scott Sorensen were new additions to the Penrith squad that played in the 2020 grand final. For the South Sydney side, Tom Burgess, Alex Johnston and Adam Reynolds were the only remaining players from Souths' last premiership victory in 2014. Panthers hooker Apisai Koroisau was also part of the 2014 Souths premiership-winning squad. Blake Taaffe, who replaced suspended fullback Latrell Mitchell, became the least experienced player in a grand final, playing only his eighth game in the NRL. A few days later at club level, Taaffe won the John Sattler Medal for rookie of the year. After the match, South Sydney interchange Benji Marshall retired from his NRL career with a total of 346 matches played.

=== Officials ===
Position			Stand-By
Referees:	Gerard Sutton (7)		Ashley Klein
Touch Judges:	David Munro (1)	Todd Smith (2)	Phil Henderson
Bunker:	Grant Atkins (1)		Source:

== Match summary ==
2021 NRL Grand Final

Sunday, 3 October
18:35 AEST (UTC+10)

Penrith Panthers	14 – 12	South Sydney Rabbitohs
Tries: 2 Burton 17'; Crichton 67'; Goals: 3 Cleary 19', pen 33', 69' (3/3)	1st: 8–6; 2nd: 6–6	Tries: 2 Walker 21'; Johnston 75'; Goals: 2 Reynolds 23', pen 45' (2/3)

Suncorp Stadium, Brisbane
Attendance: 39,322
Referee: Gerard Sutton
Touch judges: Dave Munro, Todd Smith
Clive Churchill Medal: Nathan Cleary (Penrith)

== Opening Games ==
The NRL announced that the opening games would be the Intrust Super Cup Preliminary Finals.

=== 1st Preliminary Final ===
Sunday, 3 October
12:15pm (AEST)
1.15pm (AEDT)

Wynnum Manly Seagulls	40 – 18	Tweed Seagulls
Tries: Delouise Hoeter (31', 38', 65') 3 Jayden Berrell (28', 78') 2 Francis Kalisolaite-Tualau (35') 1 Kalolo Saitaua (44') 1 Goals: Jack Campagnolo 6/7 (29', 32', 36', 46', 66', 79')	1st: 22 – 6; 2nd: 18 – 12	Tries: 1 (18') Juwan Compain; 1 (42') Liam Hampson; 1 (74') Daniel Ross; Goals: 3/3 Toby Sexton (19', 44', 75')

Suncorp Stadium, Brisbane
Referee: Tyson Brough

=== 2nd Preliminary Final ===
Sunday, 3 October
2:45pm (AEST)
3.45pm (AEDT)

Norths Devils	34 – 16	Burleigh Bears
Tries: Michael Sio (30') 1 Danny Levi (32') 1 Leivaha Pulu (38') 1 Ben Nakubuwai (62') 1 Matthew Milson (76') 1 Goals: Tyrone Roberts 7/7 (8' pen, 31', 34', 40', 64', 69' pen, 78')	1st: 20 – 0; 2nd: 14 – 16	Tries: 1 (45') Shallin Fuller; 1 (72') Sami Sauiluma; 1 (80') Kurtis Rowe; Goals: 2/2 Josh Rogers (47', 73'); 0/1 Luke Page

Suncorp Stadium, Brisbane
Referee: Nick Pelgrave
