= Matt Burton =

Australia international rugby league footballer

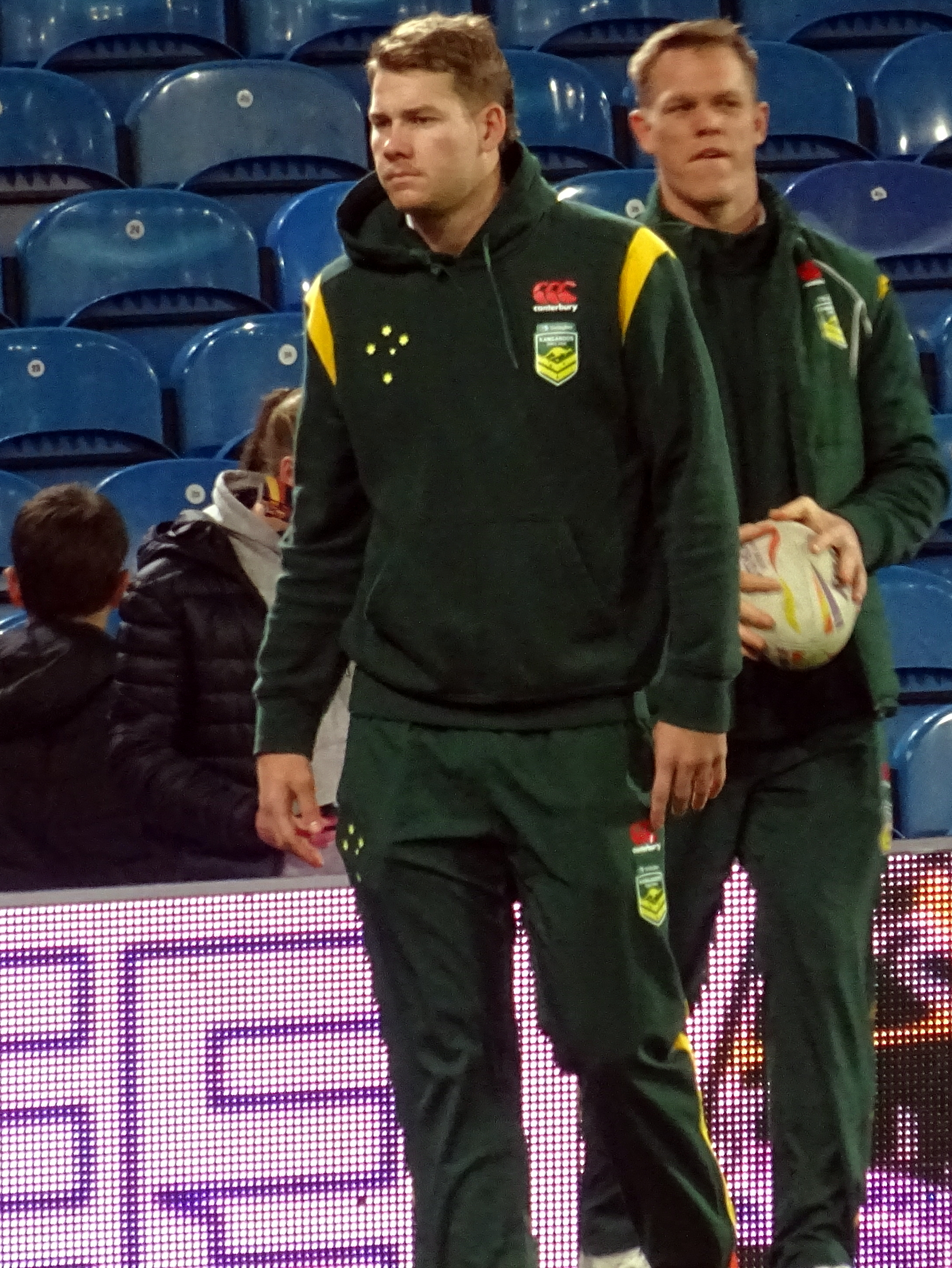

Personal information
- Born: 14 March 2000 (age 26) Dubbo, New South Wales, Australia
- Height: 190 cm (6 ft 3 in)
- Weight: 96 kg (15 st 2 lb)

Playing information
- Position: Five-eighth, Centre, Halfback
Club
Years	Team	Pld	T	G	FG	P
2019–21	Penrith Panthers	32	20	6	1	93
2022–	Canterbury Bulldogs	114	34	237	6	616
	Total	146	54	243	7	709
Representative
Years	Team	Pld	T	G	FG	P
2022–26	New South Wales	3	1	0	0	4
2022	Prime Minister's XIII	1	2	0	0	8
2022–24	Australia	5	1	0	0	4
- Source: As of 3 September 2026

Matt Burton (born 14 March 2000) is an Australian professional rugby league footballer who plays as a five-eighth for the Canterbury-Bankstown Bulldogs in the National Rugby League.

Burton represents Australia at international level and previously played for the Penrith Panthers with whom he won the 2021 NRL Grand Final as a centre, and has represented the NSW Blues in State of Origin.

== Background ==
Burton was born in Dubbo, New South Wales, Australia. Along with rugby league, Burton played rugby union growing up.

He played his junior rugby league for St Johns, Dubbo and Dubbo CYMS in the Group 11 Rugby League before being signed by the Penrith Panthers.

== Playing career ==
=== 2019 ===
Burton made his first grade debut for Penrith against Cronulla in round 21 of the 2019 NRL season which ended in a 26–20 victory for Penrith at Panthers Stadium.

=== 2020 ===
In round 3 of the 2020 NRL season, Burton missed five field goal attempts including one which struck the post as Penrith played out a 14-14 draw with the Newcastle Knights at an empty Campbelltown Sports Ground.

On 25 November 2020, Burton signed a three-year deal with Canterbury commencing in 2022.

=== 2021 ===
In round 11 of the 2021 NRL season, Burton scored a hat-trick in Penrith's 56-12 victory over South Sydney.

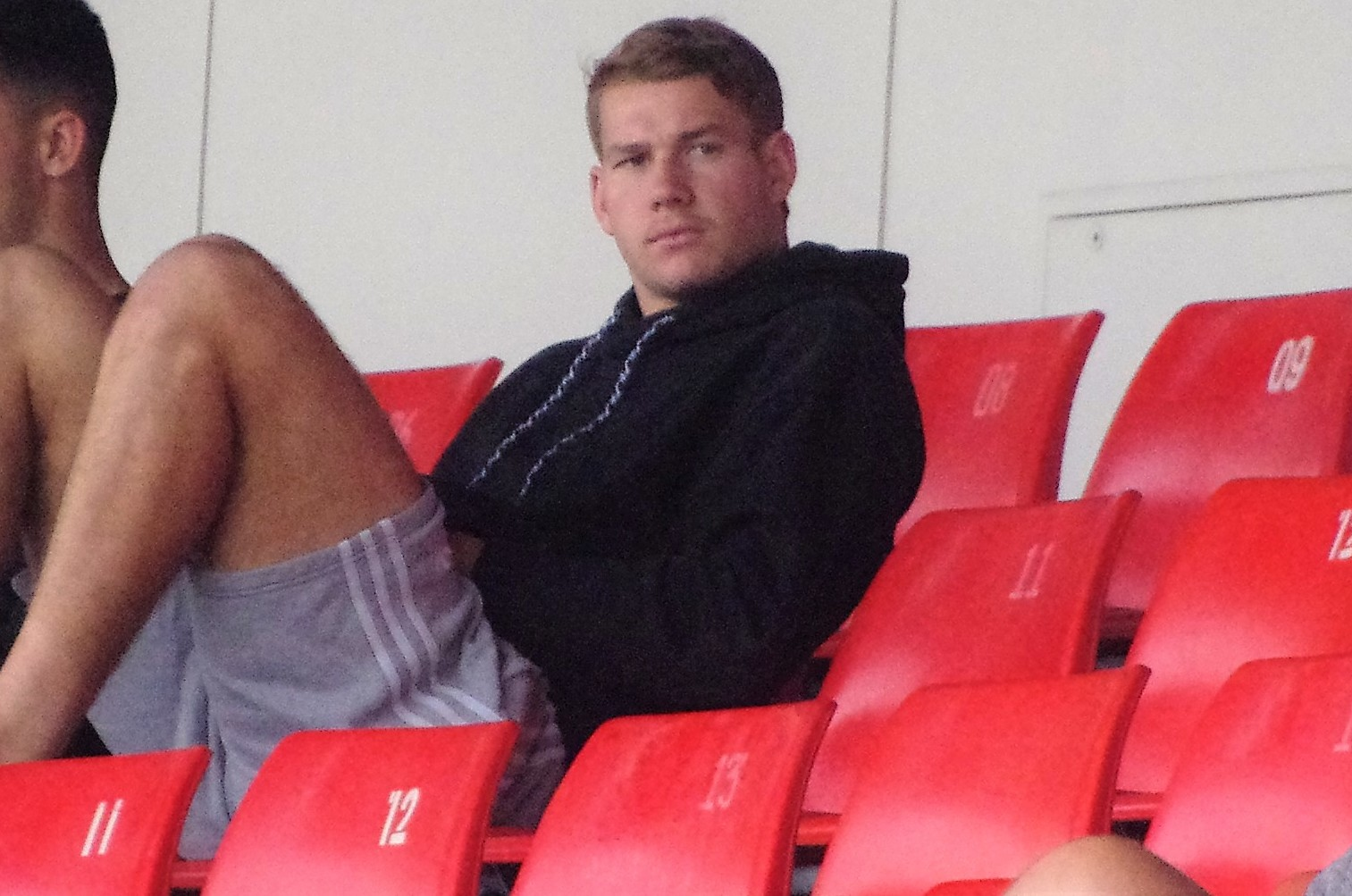
Burton watching a game in 2021

In round 16, he kicked a field goal with one minute remaining as Penrith defeated Parramatta 13-12 in front of an empty BlueBet Stadium.

On 27 September, Burton was named Dally M Centre of the year alongside Melbourne's Justin Olam.

Burton played a total of 26 games for Penrith in the 2021 NRL season including the club's 2021 NRL Grand Final victory over South Sydney. Burton scored the opening try in the final as Penrith held on to win 14-12.

=== 2022 ===
In round 1 of the 2022 NRL season, Burton made his club debut for Canterbury in their 6-4 victory against North Queensland at the Queensland Country Bank Stadium. In Round 8, Burton led Canterbury to a crucial 16-12 win over the Sydney Roosters with an excellent 40/20 which in the ensuing set led to a try for Jayden Okunbor in the corner. Burton also kicked two goals, converting one of Josh Addo-Carr's tries and Okunbor's.

In round 14 of the 2022 NRL season, Burton contributed to a 34-4 upset win over their arch-rivals Parramatta with three try assists - all from kicks, and kicking 5/6 Goals.

On 19 June, Burton was selected by New South Wales for game two of the 2022 State of Origin series. This proved an infamous statement by News Corp journalist Paul Crawley wrong, as he had stated on NRL 360 “So from a Canterbury recruitment perspective and Gus is talking about having all this money that is available in 2024, what rep player or future rep player with half a clue would want to go to the Bulldogs knowing it could be the end of your representative career if you go there?”.

Burton scored a try on debut for New South Wales in their 44-12 victory over Queensland. In game 3 of the series, Burton was sent to the sin bin after trading punches with Queensland's Dane Gagai during New South Wales 22-12 loss.

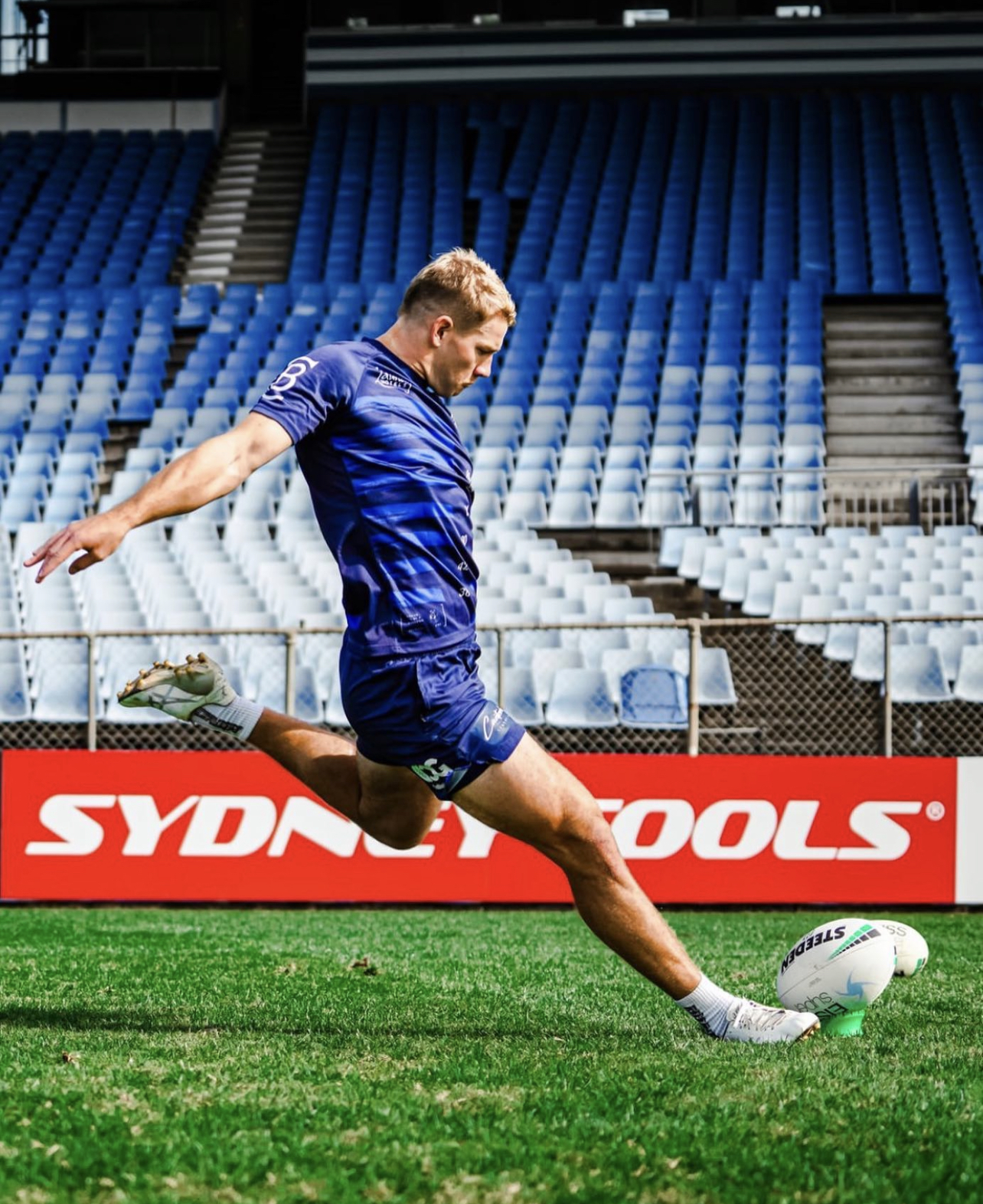
Burton warming up for the Bulldogs in 2022

In Round 19, Burton produced one of the best performances of his rugby league career against the Gold Coast Titans in Parramatta steering Canterbury to a 36-26 win. Burton scored a double and kicked 6 goals. He also had a try assist in the opening ten minutes for teammate Josh Addo-Carr. In the following week against the Newcastle Knights, Burton chip kicked to winger Addo-Carr who passed back inside for Aaron Schoupp in what was considered one of the tries of the season in Canterbury's dominant 24-10 win.

The combination between Burton and Addo-Carr had strengthened significantly after a slow start to the season, with former Brisbane Broncos winger and media personality Denan Kemp on his YouTube podcast Bloke in a Bar stating that the only similar comparison in recent rugby league memory was the connection between former Canterbury player Johnathan Thurston and North Queensland teammate Matt Bowen. Pundits applauded how quickly they built their combination which became a fixture of the new-look Canterbury side under interim coach Mick Potter and essentially revolutionised the club through innovative attacking play, averaging 25.5 points a game. The media praised Burton for helping the Canterbury side re-establish the "entertainers" tag that the club famously developed in the 1980s. Canterbury hoped that Burton would extend his contract beyond 2023 under general manager Phil Gould as they view him as the centre of building the future of the club around.

In round 25, Burton kicked a field goal with one minute remaining to beat Manly 21-20.

Burton was selected to play in the 2022 Prime Minister's XIII team to play against Papua New Guinea, alongside Canterbury teammates Josh Addo-Carr, Max King, and Jake Averillo. The Australian side won the game 64-10, with Burton scoring a try.

Rugby League World Cup

Burton was selected in the 24-man squad for the Australian Kangaroos by Mal Meninga to travel to England to compete in the 2021 Rugby League World Cup. He was accompanied by Canterbury Bulldogs winger Josh Addo-Carr, both representing the Belmore-based club.

Burton made his international debut against Scotland Rugby League Team at Coventry Building Society Arena winning 84-0. Burton scored a try on debut and executed a one-on-one steal. With the game well and truly iced, Addo-Carr and Burton pulled off a "party trick for the ages" with BBC Sport labelling them 'The Kangaroo Globetrotters'. 'But watch the play from Burton, just watch how he keeps the ball in play, Addo-Carr picks it up and it's a brilliant, brilliant finish,' Johnathan Davies added. 'Demonstrated his pace, but he wouldn't have had the opportunity unless for Burton.' 'What a play that is and then to finish it, a kick and a chase, that will be all over social media tomorrow'. The play is considered one of the best tries in Kangaroos history according to Mal Meninga. The Kangaroos went on to win the final against Samoa 30-10 at Old Trafford, with Burton not selected for play.

=== 2023 ===
On 28 January, the Canterbury club announced that Burton and Reed Mahoney would be the gameday on-field captains. Burton said "“I never thought I would have got the opportunity to Captain the side and it's obviously a really big honour. I am really looking forward to it and it's great that I'll have Reed there beside me. It's new to both of us so it's going to be a big challenge, but we're both really looking forward to leading the side". In round 5 of the 2023 NRL season, Burton kicked a field goal in golden point extra-time as Canterbury defeated North Queensland 15-14. Burton played a total of 23 games for the club throughout the season as Canterbury finished 15th on table.

=== 2024 ===
In round 5 of the 2024 NRL season, Burton scored a hat-trick and kicked five goals in Canterbury's 30-26 upset victory over the Sydney Roosters. In round 12, Burton scored two tries for Canterbury and kicked six goals in their 44-12 win over St. George Illawarra. In round 17 and 18, Burton kicked back to back golden point extra-time field goals for Canterbury which earned them victories over Cronulla and the New Zealand Warriors. Burton played a total of 23 games for Canterbury in the 2024 NRL season as the club qualified for finals finishing 6th which was the first time Canterbury had managed to do this in eight seasons. Burton played in the clubs elimination finals loss against Manly.

=== 2025 ===
In round 2 of the 2025 NRL season, Burton suffered an MCL injury in Canterbury's 40-24 victory over the Gold Coast and was ruled out from playing for at least a month. Burton played 21 games for Canterbury in the 2025 NRL season as the club finished third and qualified for the finals. Canterbury would be eliminated from the finals in straight sets.

==== 2026 ====
Burton played 12 games for Canterbury in the 2026 NRL season as the club finished 12th on the table.

== Playing style ==
Burton is known for his bomb kicks, and in an interview with nswrl.com.au in 2022; Burton said" “During junior footy I used to put them up and test all the boys out and we used to have little competitions and stuff like that,”. In the same interview, Burton also revealed that he played soccer growing up. In 2023, Burton appeared in a YouTube video for Fox League in which he talks about how to kick the "Perfect Bomb"

== Statistics ==
Year	Team	Games	Tries	Goals	FGs	Pts
2019	Penrith Panthers	1				
2020	Penrith Panthers	5	3			12
2021	Penrith Panthers	26	17	6	1	81
2022	Canterbury-Bankstown Bulldogs	24	6	50	1	125
2023	Canterbury-Bankstown Bulldogs	23	4	60	2	138
2024	Canterbury-Bankstown Bulldogs	23	9	74	3	187
2025	Canterbury-Bankstown Bulldogs	21	6	30		84
2026	Canterbury-Bankstown Bulldogs	18	6	23		70
	Totals	141	51	243	7	697
