= Dylan Edwards =

Australia international rugby league footballer

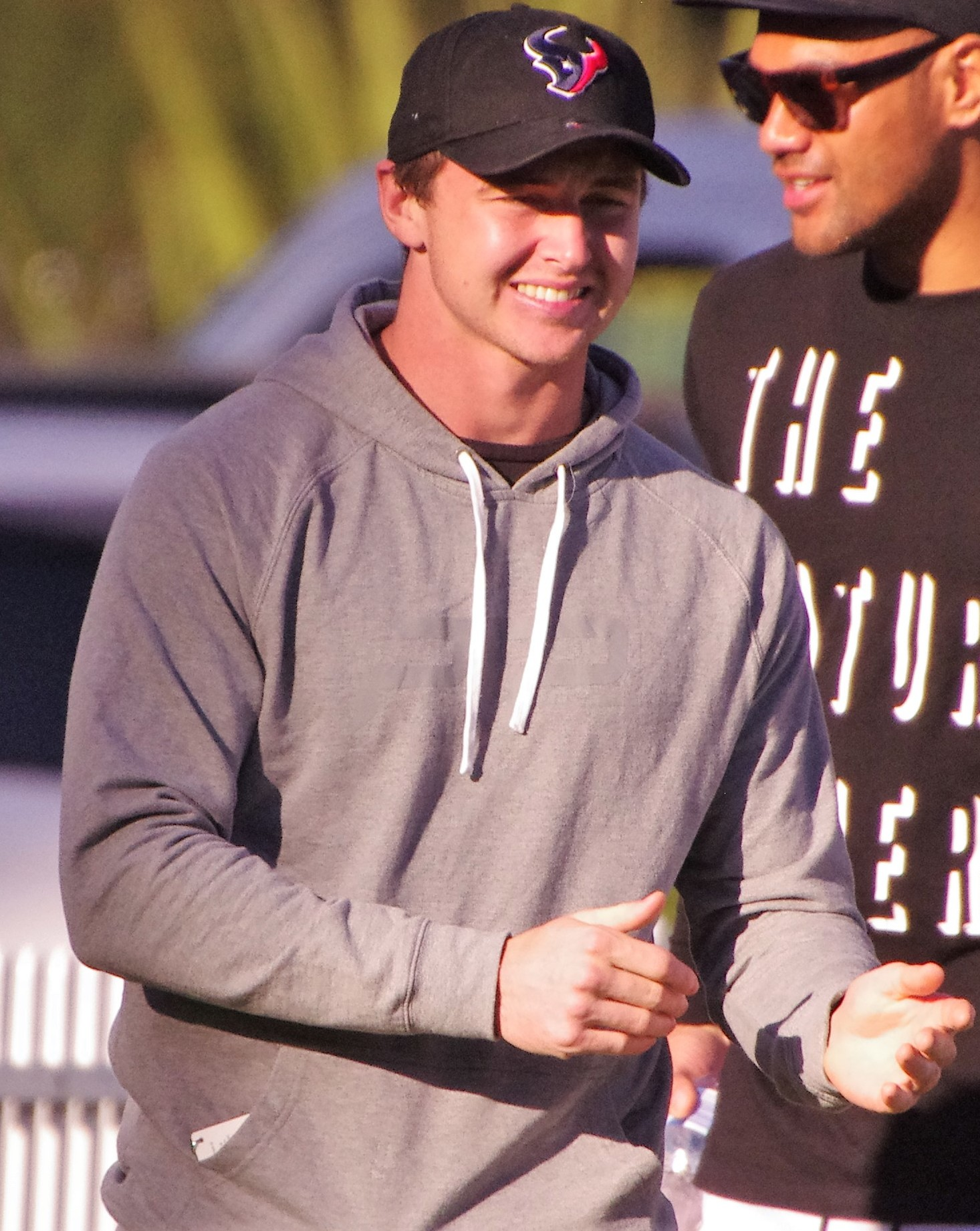

Personal information
- Born: 10 January 1996 (age 30) Albury, New South Wales, Australia
- Height: 183 cm (6 ft 0 in)
- Weight: 94 kg (14 st 11 lb)

Playing information
- Position: Fullback
Club
Years	Team	Pld	T	G	FG	P
2016–	Penrith Panthers	194	70	44	1	370
Representative
Years	Team	Pld	T	G	FG	P
2017	NSW Residents	1	0	0	0	0
2023–24	Australia	6	1	0	0	4
2024–25	New South Wales	5	2	0	0	8
- Source: As of 27 September 2026

Dylan Edwards (born 10 January 1996) is an Australian professional rugby league footballer who plays as a fullback for the Penrith Panthers in the NRL, New South Wales in State of Origin and Australia at international level.

Edwards made his NRL and test debut as a winger. Edwards played fullback in the Panthers 2021, 2022, 2023 and 2024 NRL premierships wins.

== Background ==
Edwards was born in Albury in the Murray region of New South Wales, and moved to Dorrigo in the Northern Tablelands region of New South Wales at a young age. He was educated at Dorrigo High School.

He played his junior rugby league for the Albury Pumas (now Albury Thunder) and the Bellingen Dorrigo Magpies before being signed by the Penrith Panthers in 2012.

== Playing career ==
=== Early career ===
Edwards moved to Penrith, New South Wales to play for Penrith's S. G. Ball Cup team in 2013. In 2015 and 2016, he was a member of Penrith's NYC team. On 4 October 2015, he played for the Penrith club in their 2015 NYC Grand Final win over the Manly Warringah Sea Eagles. Edwards played 44 games, scored 20 tries and kicked 72 goals for 224 points in his U20s career from 2015 to 2016.

=== 2016 ===
On 10 February, he re-signed with the Penrith club on a two-year contract until the end of 2018. On 7 May, he played for the Junior Kangaroos against the Junior Kiwis. As a result of Penrith centre Tyrone Peachey being dropped for disciplinary reasons, Edwards made his NRL debut for the Penrith against the Cronulla-Sutherland Sharks on 10 July. In September, he was named on the interchange bench in the 2016 NYC Team of the Year.

=== 2017 ===
Edwards was named in the Penrith 2017 Auckland Nines squad. He played 14 games for Penrith in the 2017 NRL season and scored two tries for the Penrith club.

=== 2018 ===
In Round 8 of the 2018 NRL season, Edwards suffered a season ending shoulder injury after a tackle in the 13th minute against Canterbury-Bankstown.

=== 2019 ===
Edwards made a total of 20 appearances for Penrith in the 2019 NRL season as the club finished a disappointing 10th on the table and missed out on the finals for the first time since 2015.

=== 2020 ===
On 20 February, it was revealed that Edwards had suffered a syndesmosis tear in his right ankle following a training session. Edwards later had surgery and was ruled out for an indefinite period. He returned in round 6 against the Melbourne Storm.

Edwards played 14 games for Penrith as the club claimed the Minor Premiership and reached the 2020 NRL Grand Final. Edwards played at fullback in the grand final which Penrith lost 26-20 to Melbourne.

=== 2021 ===
In round 19 of the 2021 NRL season, Edwards kicked his first field goal against the Brisbane Broncos which was a two point field goal in Penrith's 18-12 victory.

In round 22, Edwards scored two tries in a 34-16 victory over St. George Illawarra.

Edwards played a total of 21 games for Penrith in the 2021 NRL season including the club's 2021 NRL Grand Final victory over South Sydney.

=== 2022 ===
Edwards played 25 games for Penrith in the 2022 NRL season and scored nine tries. Edwards played in Penrith's 2022 NRL Grand Final victory over Parramatta and was awarded the Clive Churchill Medal as man of the match.

=== 2023 ===
In round 6 of the 2023 NRL season, Edwards scored four tries in Penrith's 44-12 victory over Manly. He re-signed a long term deal to stay in Penrith, as the clubs star fullback In round 25, Edwards scored two tries for Penrith in their 40-14 victory over the Gold Coast. On 30 August, Edwards signed a four-year contract extension with Penrith worth $3.4 million. Edwards played 26 games for Penrith in the 2023 NRL season including the clubs 26-24 victory over Brisbane in the 2023 NRL Grand Final as Penrith won their third straight premiership.

=== 2024 ===
On 24 February, Edwards played in Penrith's 2024 World Club Challenge final loss against Wigan. Edwards scored a try in the first half of the match. In round 5 of the 2024 NRL season, Edwards scored two tries and kicked three goals in Penrith's 32-18 loss against Manly. On 26 May, Edwards was named at fullback for New South Wales for Game 1 of the 2024 State of Origin series replacing incumbent fullback James Tedesco. On 1 June, it was announced that Edwards would miss the state of origin opener after picking up a quad injury at training. On 16 June, Edwards was selected by New South Wales for game two of the series after his return from injury, making his début in Game 2 in Melbourne on 25 June 2024. Edwards played a total of 20 games for Penrith in the 2024 NRL season including their 14-6 grand final victory over Melbourne.

=== 2025 ===
In May, Edwards was selected by New South Wales ahead of game one in the 2025 State of Origin series. Edwards played in all three games as New South Wales lost the series 2-1 despite going in as favourites to claim the shield. Edwards played a total of 20 games for Penrith in the 2025 NRL season as the club finished 7th on the table. He played in Penrith's narrow preliminary final loss against Brisbane.

=== 2026 ===
Edwards played 23 games for Penrith in the 2026 NRL season as the club claimed the minor premiership but suffered a shock defeat to Newcastle in the preliminary final.

== Honours ==
Individual

- Ben Alexander Rookie of The Year: 2017
- John Farragher Award: 2021
- Penrith Panthers Members Player of The Year: 2023
- Penrith Panthers Merv Cartwright Medal: 2022
- Clive Churchill Medal: 2022
- Dally M Fullback of the Year 2026

Club

- NRL Premiership: 2021, 2022, 2023, 2024
- NRL Minor Premiership: 2020, 2022, 2023, 2026

State of Origin

- State of Origin Winner: 2024

== Statistics ==
=== Club ===
†	Denotes seasons in which Edwards won an NRL Premiership

Season	Team	Matches	T	G	GK %	F/G	Pts
2016	Penrith	1	0	0	-	0	0
2017	Penrith	16	2	0	-	0	8
2018	Penrith	8	3	0	-	0	12
2019	Penrith	20	6	0	-	0	24
2020	Penrith	14	5	0	-	0	20
2021†	Penrith	21	5	0	-	1 (Note: Includes 1 two point field goal.)	22
2022†	Penrith	25	9	0	-	0	36
2023†	Penrith	26	12	2	100.00%	0	52
2024†	Penrith	20	10	31	79.41%	0	102
2025	Penrith	20	6	9			42
2026	Penrith	23	12	2	66.67%	0	52
Career totals		181	67	42	80.56%	1	356
