= Tyrone May =

Samoa rugby league footballer (born 1996)

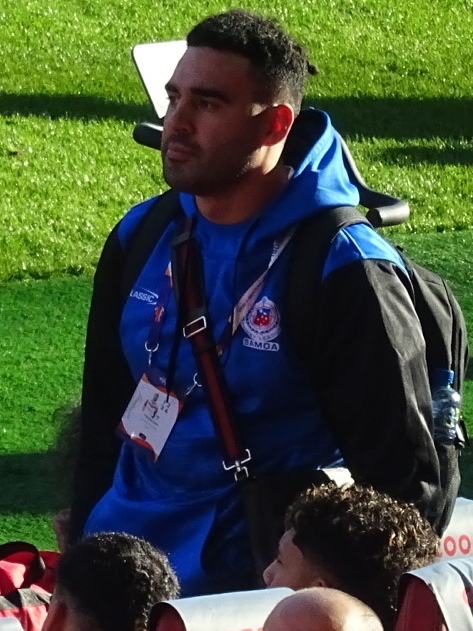

Personal information
- Full name: Tyrone May
- Born: 21 June 1996 (age 30) Blacktown, New South Wales, Australia
- Height: 6 ft 2 in (1.89 m)
- Weight: 15 st 6 lb (98 kg)

Playing information
- Position: Stand-off, Centre, Scrum-half
Club
Years	Team	Pld	T	G	FG	P
2017–21	Penrith Panthers	56	10	0	0	40
2022–23	Catalans Dragons	45	7	2	0	32
2024–	Hull Kingston Rovers	91	23	0	0	92
	Total	192	40	2	0	164
Representative
Years	Team	Pld	T	G	FG	P
2017	NSW Residents	1	0	0	0	0
2018–22	Samoa	2	1	0	0	4
- Source: As of 19 September 2026
- Education: Patrician Brothers' College, Blacktown
- Relatives: Taylan May (brother); Terrell May (brother)

Tyrone May (born 21 June 1996) is a Samoa international rugby league footballer who plays for Hull Kingston Rovers in the Super League. Primarily a stand-off, May has played in a number of other positions during his career, including centre, scrum-half, loose forward and fullback.

May previously played for the Penrith Panthers in the NRL with whom he won the 2021 NRL Grand Final coming off the bench.

== Background ==
May was born in Sydney, Australia, to a Samoan mother and Australian father. He was educated at Patrician Brothers' College, Blacktown.

He played his junior rugby league for the Minchinbury Jets in the Penrith District Rugby League.

May's younger brothers Taylan and Terrell are also professional rugby league players.

== Playing career ==
=== 2017 ===
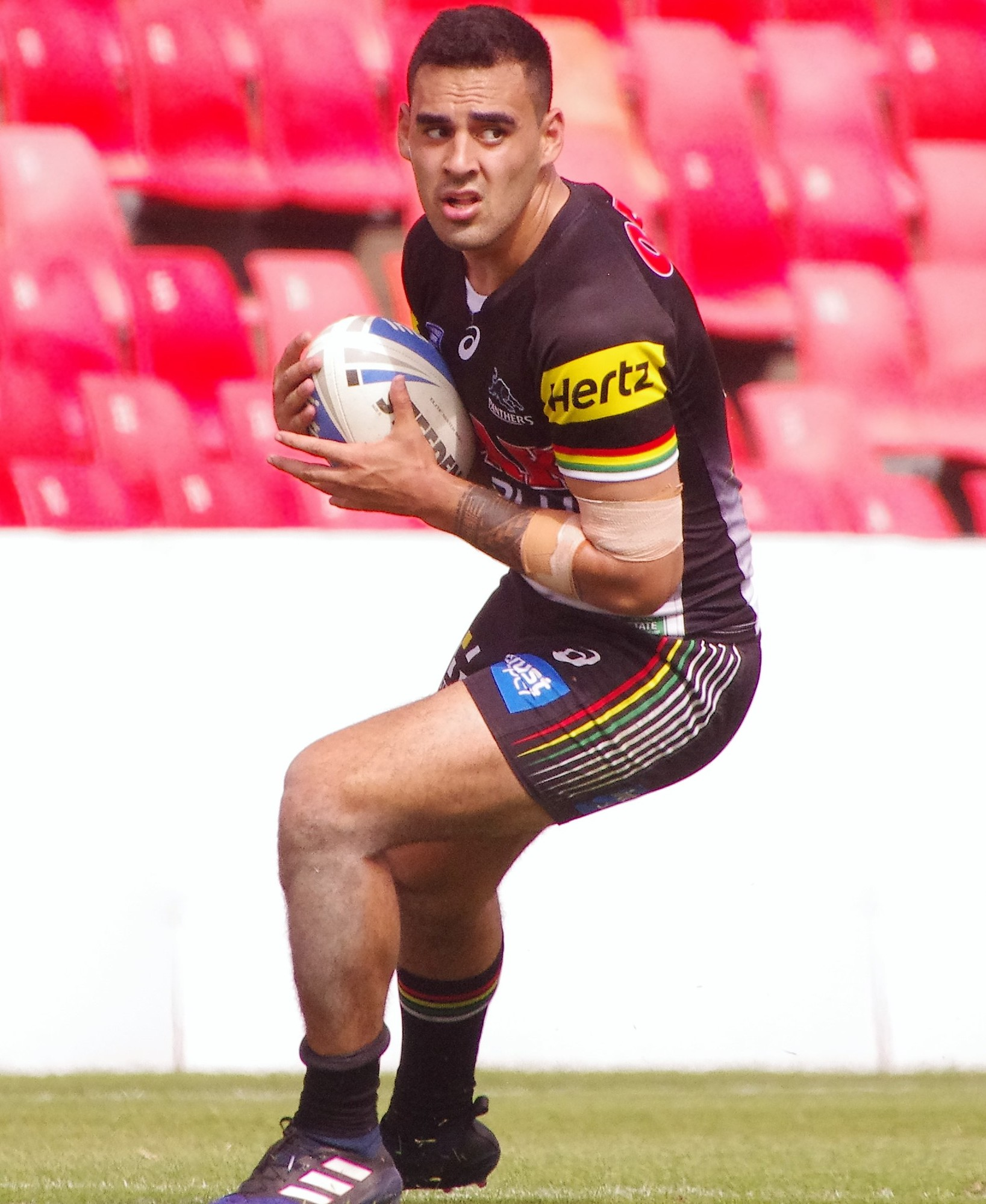
May playing for Penrith in 2017

In round 19, May made his first grade debut in the Panthers 34–22 win over the New Zealand Warriors at Mount Smart Stadium scoring a try on debut.

=== 2018 ===
On 23 June, May made his international debut for Samoa, playing five-eighth in the 22–38 loss to Tonga, scoring a try. On 20 August, May was fined $1100 after he was charged by the NRL for punching an opponent in Penrith's loss to Newcastle.

=== 2019 ===
On 5 March, May was stood down from playing by the NRL after being charged by NSW Police in relation to sex tapes the player filmed dating back to February 2018. May was charged with two counts which were filming and disseminating the footage without consent. May and Penrith Intrust Super Premiership NSW player Liam Coleman who is the son of former South Sydney player Craig Coleman were summoned to Penrith Police Station where May was granted bail and was ordered to appear at Penrith Local Court on 1 May 2019.

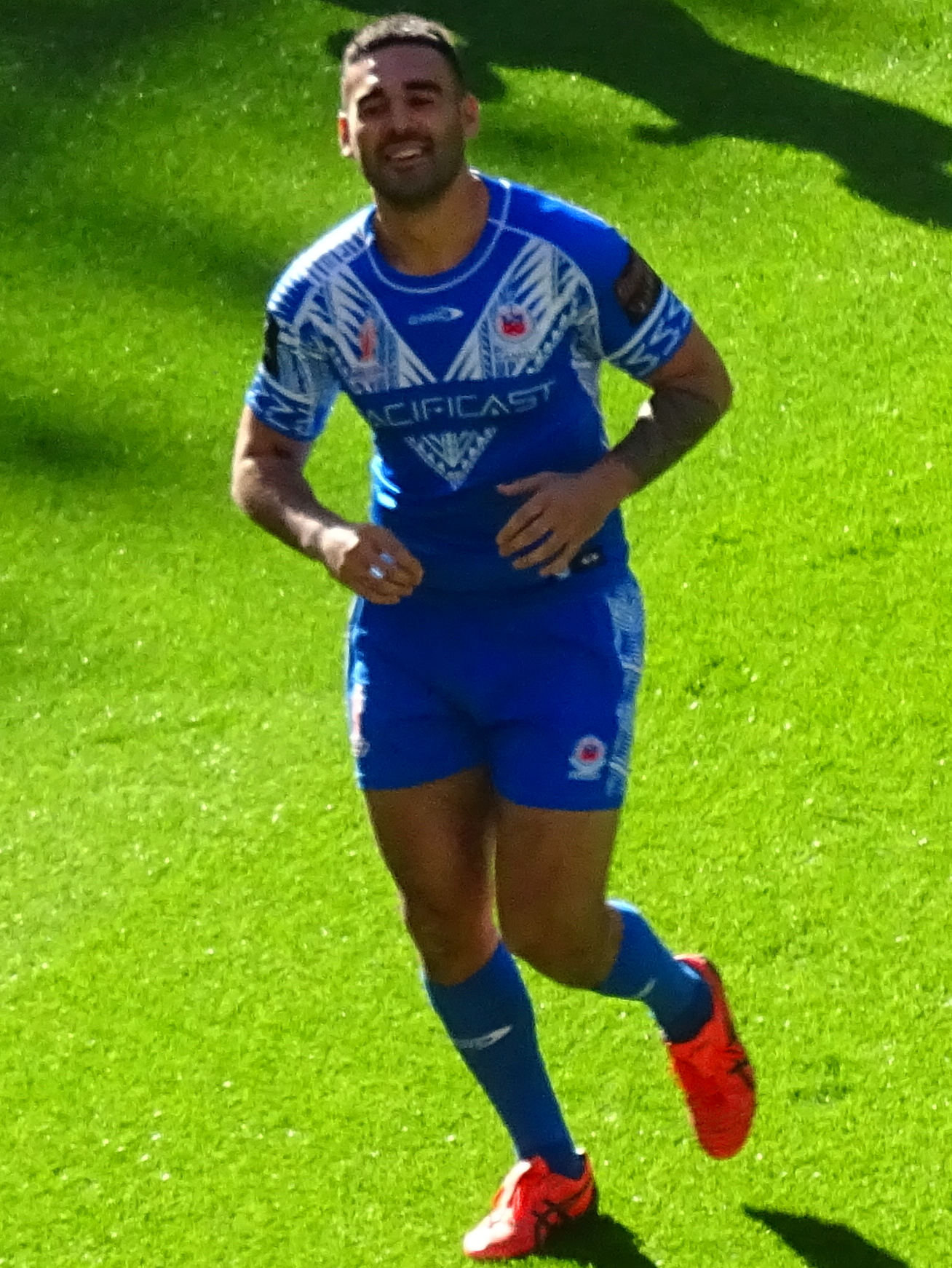
May on international duty with Samoa at the 2021 RLWC

On 16 July, May was hit with fresh charges at Parramatta Local Court by NSW Police bringing the total number of charges to eight. NSW Police laid additional counts of recording and distributing intimate images without consent against May. May faced a possible ban from the sport altogether if he was found guilty.

On 22 November 2019, May pleaded guilty to four charges of intentionally recording an intimate image without consent. He appeared again at court for sentencing on 31 January 2020.

=== 2020 ===
On 31 January, May narrowly avoided jail and was sentenced to 300 hours of community service plus a three-year good behaviour bond over sex tapes filmed without consent. Magistrate Robyn Denes spoke in the court to May saying "This behaviour is not only morally reprehensible, it's criminal, Ultimately, this is an offence which takes what was consensual sexual acts to another level. It does breach trust".

On 8 February, it was announced by the NRL that May would be suspended for the first four matches of the 2020 NRL season and fined 25 percent of his 2019 salary which he earned at Penrith.

May played 16 games for Penrith in the 2020 NRL season as the club won the Minor Premiership. He scored a try for Penrith in their preliminary final victory over South Sydney and was selected ahead of teammate Brent Naden for the 2020 NRL Grand Final. Following Ryan Papenhuyzen's try where he ran past May untouched, Melbourne raced out to a 26–0 lead in the grand final. May was substituted by coach Ivan Cleary and took no further part in the game as Penrith mounted a comeback but ultimately lost 26–20.

=== 2021 ===
May played a total of 21 games for Penrith in the 2021 NRL season including the club's 2021 NRL Grand Final victory over South Sydney.

Following Penrith's grand final victory, May posted a story on both Instagram and Twitter saying "And the dirt that they threw on my name turned to soil and I grew up out it, Time for y'all to figure out what y'all gon' do about it. Love my brothers". After posting the story, several Penrith players also took to social media in support of May's message. May later removed the post from both social media platforms after it caused outrage from the general public, most notably from Fox Sports commentator Andrew Voss who said “Someone has to pull this bloke to one side and say, ‘What the hell? What world do you live in?, “He was an inch away from being sent to jail. And the support of the players. No less than 10 players came out (saying), ‘With you brother’ … and all that. Just keep it in-house, boys. I don't think it did Tyrone any favours at all".

Lawyer and Wests Tigers chairman Lee Hagipantelis, who acted for a woman depicted in a video recorded by May, also reacted to the post. "I do hope that Tyrone doesn't think that a premiership victory somehow vindicates criminal behaviour, One only needs to have a look at the comments made by the magistrate when Tyrone was convicted to see how serious it was. It's something he should quite probably be quite embarrassed and ashamed of and not necessarily espouse or seek to justify, if that's what he was intending to do".

On 19 October, May was stood down by Penrith and issued a breach notice by the NRL alleging he acted contrary to the best interests of the game for posting and being part of social media posts which do not align with the values of the game. The Breach Notice proposed May must complete further education programs as directed by the NRL. May was also issued with a proposed $7,500 fine. On 27 October, May was issued with a show cause notice by the Penrith club due to a serious breach in his playing contract which was in relation to his post on Instagram following the club's victory in the 2021 NRL Grand Final.

On 3 November, May's contract was terminated by the Penrith Panthers board. On 1 December 2021, it was reported that May had signed for Catalans Dragons in the Super League.

=== 2022 ===
In round 1 of the 2022 Super League season, May made his club debut for Catalans Dragons where they lost 28-8 against St Helens R.F.C.

In June, May signed a one-year contract extension to remain at Catalans until the end of the 2023 season.

In October May was named in the Samoa squad for the 2021 Rugby League World Cup.

=== 2023 ===
On 21 August, May signed a two-year deal to join Hull Kingston Rovers starting in 2024. On 14 October, May played in Catalans 2023 Super League Grand Final loss against Wigan.

=== 2024 ===
May played 28 matches for Hull Kingston Rovers in the 2024 Super League season. On 12 October, May played in Hull Kingston Rovers 2024 Super League Grand Final loss against Wigan.

=== 2025 ===
On 7 June, May played in Hull Kingston Rovers 8-6 Challenge Cup final victory over Warrington. It was the clubs first major trophy in 40 years. On 18 September, May played in and scored against Warrington on the last game of the regular season which would see Hull Kingston Rovers lift the League Leaders Shield On 9 October, May played in Hull Kingston Rovers 2025 Super League Grand Final victory over Wigan.

=== 2026 ===
On 19 February, May played in Hull Kingston Rovers World Club Challenge victory against Brisbane.

== Statistics ==
Year	Team	Games	Tries	Goals	Pts
2017	Penrith Panthers	9	5		20
2018	Penrith Panthers	10	1		4
2020	Penrith Panthers	16	1		4
2021	Penrith Panthers	21	3		12
2022	Catalans Dragons	25	4	2	20
2023	Catalans Dragons	20	3		12
2024	Hull Kingston Rovers	31	6		24
2025	Hull Kingston Rovers	30	6		24
2026	Hull Kingston Rovers	10	4		16
	Totals	172	33	2	116
