= 2026 Men's Rugby League World Cup squads =

World Cup staging squads

This article lists the official squads for the 2026 Men's Rugby League World Cup which was played from 15 October to 15 November 2026.

The age listed for each player is as of 15 October 2026, the first day of the tournament.

== Pool A ==
In the initial three rounds, each team in Pool A plays matches against each of the other three teams in Pool A.

=== Australia ===
Head coach: (Australia) Kevin Walters

Australia announced their 23-man squad on 5 October 2026. Thomas Jenkins, Hamish Stewart and Ethan Strange were named as shadow players. Lindsay Collins was originally named but ruled out due to a foot injury. He was replaced by Lindsay Smith. On 17 October 2026, Mitchell Moses was ruled out for the tournament after suffering a calf injury in Australia's opening game against New Zealand, with Strange being called into the squad as his replacement.

Player	Date of birth (age)	Games	Points	Club
Bradman Best	9 August 2001 (aged 25)	0	0	(Australia) Newcastle Knights
Jack Bostock	23 August 2003 (aged 23)	0	0	(Australia) Dolphins
Blayke Brailey	23 September 1998 (aged 28)	0	0	(Australia) Cronulla-Sutherland Sharks
Patrick Carrigan	1 January 1998 (aged 28)	14	0	(Australia) Brisbane Broncos
Reuben Cotter	28 December 1998 (aged 27)	11	0	(Australia) North Queensland Cowboys
Tom Dearden	13 March 2001 (aged 25)	6	4	(Australia) North Queensland Cowboys
Tino Fa'asuamaleaui	16 February 2000 (aged 26)	10	4	(Australia) Gold Coast Titans
David Fifita	25 February 2000 (aged 26)	0	0	(Australia) South Sydney Rabbitohs
Harry Grant	17 February 1998 (aged 28)	14	8	(Australia) Melbourne Storm
Keaon Koloamatangi	23 May 1998 (aged 28)	3	0	(Australia) South Sydney Rabbitohs
Liam Martin	5 March 1997 (aged 29)	5	12	(Australia) Penrith Panthers
Latrell Mitchell	16 June 1997 (aged 29)	9	32	(Australia) South Sydney Rabbitohs
Mitchell Moses	16 September 1994 (aged 32)	3	4	(Australia) Parramatta Eels
Cameron Munster	13 September 1994 (aged 32)	15	20	(Australia) Melbourne Storm
Cameron Murray	16 January 1998 (aged 28)	10	28	(Australia) South Sydney Rabbitohs
Jacob Preston	11 October 2001 (aged 25)	0	0	(Australia) Canterbury-Bankstown Bulldogs
Lindsay Smith	13 January 2000 (aged 26)	2	0	(Australia) Penrith Panthers
Kotoni Staggs	29 October 1998 (aged 27)	6	14	(Australia) Brisbane Broncos
Ethan Strange	16 August 2004 (aged 22)	0	0	(Australia) Canberra Raiders
James Tedesco	8 January 1993 (aged 33)	13	36	(Australia) Sydney Roosters
Tom Trbojevic	2 October 1996 (aged 30)	7	24	(Australia) Manly Warringah Sea Eagles
Sam Walker	16 June 2002 (aged 24)	0	0	(Australia) Sydney Roosters
Reece Walsh	10 July 2002 (aged 24)	3	16	(Australia) Brisbane Broncos
Isaah Yeo (c)	6 November 1994 (aged 31)	13	8	(Australia) Penrith Panthers

=== Cook Islands ===
Head coach: (Australia) Karmichael Hunt

Cook Islands announced their 23-man squad on 6 October 2026. Valentine Holmes features in the squad, having previously won two World Cups (2017 and 2021) with Australia.

Player	Date of birth (age)	Games	Points	Club
Cameron Brown	13 May 2002 (aged 24)	0	0	(Australia) Brisbane Tigers
Rhys Dakin	15 March 2001 (aged 25)	6	0	(Australia) Sydney Roosters
Glassie Glassie		0	0	(Australia) Wests Tigers
Valentine Holmes	24 July 1996 (aged 30)	0	0	(Australia) St. George Illawarra Dragons
Esom Ioka	13 December 2002 (aged 23)	7	40	(Australia) Brisbane Tigers
KL Iro (c)	20 February 2000 (aged 26)	11	14	(Australia) Cronulla-Sutherland Sharks
Chaev Kolone	16 March 2007 (aged 19)	0	0	(Australia) Canberra Raiders
Makahesi Makatoa	30 January 1993 (aged 33)	12	4	(Australia) Sydney Roosters
Esan Marsters	17 August 1996 (aged 30)	13	18	(England) Bradford Bulls
Amare Milford	15 January 2006 (aged 20)	0	0	(Australia) Melbourne Storm
Davvy Moale	23 March 2003 (aged 23)	9	16	(Australia) Melbourne Storm
K-Ci Newton-Whare	9 January 2004 (aged 22)	0	0	(Australia) Melbourne Storm
Rua Ngatikaura	27 May 2000 (aged 26)	9	12	(Australia) North Sydney Bears
Marata Niukore (c)	29 July 1996 (aged 30)	4	16	New Zealand Warriors
Pride Petterson-Robati	16 June 1995 (aged 31)	10	4	(Australia) Souths Logan Magpies
Reuben Porter	26 March 1997 (aged 29)	11	0	(Australia) St. George Illawarra Dragons
Reubenn Rennie	22 October 1995 (aged 30)	12	20	(France) Toulouse Olympique
Brad Takairangi	14 June 1989 (aged 37)	14	10	(Australia) Glebe Dirty Reds
Mason Teague	13 July 2003 (aged 23)	5	4	(Australia) Burleigh Bears
David Tuariki		0	0	(Australia) Melbourne Storm
Paul Ulberg	14 November 1995 (aged 30)	8	20	(France) Toulouse Olympique
Delahia Wigmore	10 May 2004 (aged 22)	3	4	(Australia) Penrith Panthers
Maui Winitana-Patelesio		0	0	New Zealand Warriors

=== Fiji ===
Head coach: (Australia) Mick Potter

Fiji announced their 23-man squad on 5 October 2026. Jimmy Ngutlik, who previously played for Papua New Guinea at the 2021 World Cup, was originally named but withdrawn. He was replaced by Zion Johnson.

Player	Date of birth (age)	Games	Points	Club
Bayleigh Bentley-Hape	8 March 2000 (aged 26)	0	0	(Australia) South Sydney Rabbitohs
Waqa Blake	26 October 1994 (aged 31)	7	12	(England) Bradford Bulls
Kurt Donoghoe	30 November 2001 (aged 24)	7	12	(Australia) Dolphins
Apenisa Driti	8 February 2000 (aged 26)	0	0	(Australia) Northern Pride
Zion Johnson		0	0	(Australia) Sunshine Coast Falcons
Kitione Kautoga	2 September 2002 (aged 24)	6	16	(Australia) Parramatta Eels
Elijah Keung	29 January 2006 (aged 20)	0	0	(Australia) South Sydney Rabbitohs
Apisai Koroisau (c)	7 November 1992 (aged 33)	17	46	(Australia) Wests Tigers
Josese Lanyon		0	0	(Australia) Wests Tigers
Jordan Leiu	10 April 1999 (aged 27)	0	0	(Australia) Norths Devils
Joseph Litidamu		0	0	(Australia) Melbourne Storm
Kylan Mafoa		3	0	(Australia) Manly Warringah Sea Eagles
Taane Milne	19 May 1995 (aged 31)	17	48	(England) Huddersfield Giants
Caleb Navale	8 May 2003 (aged 23)	7	8	(Australia) Manly Warringah Sea Eagles
Ronald Philitoga	27 September 2001 (aged 25)	1	0	(Australia) North Queensland Cowboys
Mitchell Prest	8 July 2003 (aged 23)	0	0	(Australia) Mackay Cutters
Emosi Ravosai		0	0	New Zealand Warriors
Jacob Saifiti	1 May 1996 (aged 30)	7	0	(Australia) Newcastle Knights
Solomone Saukuru	4 November 2004 (aged 21)	2	8	(Australia) Wests Tigers
Sunia Turuva	4 September 2002 (aged 24)	10	20	(Australia) Wests Tigers
Semi Valemei	20 January 1999 (aged 27)	9	20	(England) Castleford Tigers
Brandon Wakeham	11 January 1999 (aged 27)	12	105	(Australia) Manly Warringah Sea Eagles
Jordan Miller	7 February 2005 (aged 21)	2	0	(Australia) Parramatta Eels

=== New Zealand ===
Head coach: (New Zealand) Stacey Jones

New Zealand announced their 23-man squad on 6 October 2026. The squad features Dane Gagai, who won the 2017 World Cup with Australia and played seven Tests for the country.

Player	Date of birth (age)	Games	Points	Club
Erin Clark	6 September 1997 (aged 29)	4	4	New Zealand Warriors
James Fisher-Harris (c)	5 January 1996 (aged 30)	21	8	New Zealand Warriors
Dane Gagai	3 January 1991 (aged 35)	0	0	(Australia) Newcastle Knights
Jahrome Hughes	8 October 1994 (aged 32)	10	24	(Australia) Melbourne Storm
Jamayne Isaako	5 June 1996 (aged 30)	14	141	(Australia) Dolphins
Keano Kini	14 April 2004 (aged 22)	5	8	(Australia) Gold Coast Titans
Jacob Laban	17 April 2004 (aged 22)	0	0	New Zealand Warriors
Moses Leota	20 July 1995 (aged 31)	9	0	(Australia) Penrith Panthers
Jeremy Marshall-King	2 December 1995 (aged 30)	3	8	(Australia) Dolphins
Te Maire Martin	2 October 1995 (aged 31)	6	12	New Zealand Warriors
Casey McLean	24 April 2006 (aged 20)	4	32	(Australia) Penrith Panthers
Ronaldo Mulitalo	17 November 1999 (aged 26)	9	28	(Australia) Cronulla-Sutherland Sharks
Charnze Nicoll-Klokstad	2 August 1995 (aged 31)	16	20	New Zealand Warriors
Briton Nikora	7 December 1997 (aged 28)	16	16	(Australia) Dolphins
Kodi Nikorima	3 April 1994 (aged 32)	18	8	(Australia) Cronulla-Sutherland Sharks
Isaiah Papali'i	20 September 1998 (aged 28)	16	22	(Australia) Penrith Panthers
Kalyn Ponga	30 March 1998 (aged 28)	0	0	(Australia) Newcastle Knights
Scott Sorensen	13 March 1993 (aged 33)	4	0	(Australia) Penrith Panthers
Tanner Stowers-Smith	3 March 2004 (aged 22)	0	0	New Zealand Warriors
Joseph Tapine	4 May 1994 (aged 32)	25	12	(Australia) Canberra Raiders
Leo Thompson	28 May 2000 (aged 26)	5	4	(Australia) Canterbury-Bankstown Bulldogs
Naufahu Whyte	4 April 2002 (aged 24)	6	8	(Australia) Sydney Roosters
Xavier Willison	2 August 2002 (aged 24)	2	0	(Australia) Brisbane Broncos

== Pool B ==
In the initial three rounds, each team in Pool B plays matches against each of the three teams in Pool C.

=== England ===
Head coach: (England) Brian McDermott

England announced their 23-man squad on 5 October 2026. Morgan Smithies was ruled out through injury and replaced by Kallum Watkins.

Player	Date of birth (age)	Games	Points	Club
Matty Ashton	28 July 1998 (aged 28)	5	24	(England) Warrington Wolves
AJ Brimson	9 September 1998 (aged 28)	2	0	(Australia) Gold Coast Titans
Ben Currie	15 July 1994 (aged 32)	10	12	(England) Warrington Wolves
Zach Eckersley	10 November 2003 (aged 22)	0	0	(England) Wigan Warriors
Herbie Farnworth	23 December 1999 (aged 26)	9	24	(Australia) Dolphins
Ethan Havard	26 October 2000 (aged 25)	4	4	(England) Wigan Warriors
Max King	4 May 1997 (aged 29)	0	0	(Australia) Canterbury-Bankstown Bulldogs
Morgan Knowles	5 November 1996 (aged 29)	11	0	(Australia) Dolphins
Mikey Lewis	4 July 2001 (aged 25)	8	10	(England) Hull Kingston Rovers
Jez Litten	10 March 1998 (aged 28)	4	0	(England) Hull Kingston Rovers
Junior Nsemba	24 July 2004 (aged 22)	1	0	(England) Wigan Warriors
Brad O'Neill	22 July 2002 (aged 24)	1	0	(England) Wigan Warriors
Kai Pearce-Paul	19 February 2001 (aged 25)	6	8	(Australia) Wests Tigers
Victor Radley	14 March 1998 (aged 28)	9	8	(Australia) Sydney Roosters
Hugo Savala	8 April 2002 (aged 24)	0	0	(Australia) Sydney Roosters
Harry Smith	25 January 2000 (aged 26)	9	80	(England) Wigan Warriors
Ben Talty	30 January 1999 (aged 27)	0	0	(Australia) Brisbane Broncos
Luke Thompson	27 April 1995 (aged 31)	9	8	(England) Wigan Warriors
Sam Walters	25 December 2000 (aged 25)	0	0	(England) Wigan Warriors
Kallum Watkins	12 March 1991 (aged 35)	31	60	(England) Leeds Rhinos
Jack Welsby	17 March 2001 (aged 25)	13	16	(England) St Helens
George Williams (c)	31 October 1994 (aged 31)	23	46	(England) Warrington Wolves
Dom Young	9 August 2001 (aged 25)	8	36	(Australia) Newcastle Knights

=== Lebanon ===
Head coach: (Australia) Michael Cheika

Lebanon announced their 23-man squad on 7 October 2026.

Player	Date of birth (age)	Games	Points	Club
Mohamed Alameddine		1	4	(Australia) Parramatta Eels
Yehya Ayache		1	0	(Australia) South Sydney Rabbitohs
Jalal Bazzaz	24 August 2000 (aged 26)	5	0	(Australia) Shellharbour Stingrays
Alex Conti	7 June 2006 (aged 20)	0	0	(Australia) Canterbury-Bankstown Bulldogs
Tony Francis	24 December 2002 (aged 23)	0	0	(Australia) Gold Coast Titans
Tupou Francis		0	0	(Australia) Brisbane Broncos
Michael Gabrael	7 January 2005 (aged 21)	0	0	(Australia) Cronulla-Sutherland Sharks
Mikael Ibrahim		1	0	(Australia) Gold Coast Titans
Moustafa Dirani		1	0	(Australia) St Marys Saints
Cameron Kanaan	22 March 2005 (aged 21)	0	0	(Australia) Penrith Panthers
Jacob Kiraz	23 November 2001 (aged 24)	4	4	(Australia) Canterbury-Bankstown Bulldogs
Ibrahim El Labban		1	0	(Australia) Wentworthville Magpies
Abbas Miski	25 July 1995 (aged 31)	13	72	(England) Wigan Warriors
Brad Morkos	27 February 2003 (aged 23)	4	4	(Australia) St. George Illawarra Dragons
Joseph Nohra		0	0	(Australia) Parramatta Eels
Khaled Rajab	26 February 2002 (aged 24)	3	4	(Australia) Newtown Jets
Jaxson Rahme	4 December 2003 (aged 22)	3	0	(Australia) Sydney Roosters
Khalil Rahme	14 October 2000 (aged 26)	5	0	(Australia) Newtown Jets
James Roumanos	10 August 1999 (aged 27)	5	0	(France) Toulouse Olympique
Jason Saab	8 October 2000 (aged 26)	0	0	(Australia) Manly Warringah Sea Eagles
Jordan Samrani	29 January 2002 (aged 24)	0	0	(Australia) Parramatta Eels
Tony Sukkar	25 May 2004 (aged 22)	0	0	(Australia) Wests Tigers
Charbel Tasipale	24 February 2000 (aged 26)	4	8	(Australia) Newtown Jets
Alex Twal	3 April 1996 (aged 30)	4	0	(Australia) Wests Tigers

=== Samoa ===
Head coach: (Australia) Ben Gardiner

Samoa announced their 23-man squad on 6 October 2026. Greg Marzhew was originally named but later ruled out due to injury. He was replaced by Eddie Ieremia-Toeava.

Player	Date of birth (age)	Games	Points	Club
Shawn Blore	1 August 2000 (aged 26)	2	4	(Australia) Melbourne Storm
Stephen Crichton	22 September 2000 (aged 26)	8	77	(Australia) Canterbury-Bankstown Bulldogs
Sua Fa'alogo	19 March 2003 (aged 23)	2	0	(Australia) Melbourne Storm
Clayton Faulalo	26 May 2000 (aged 26)	0	0	(Australia) Manly Warringah Sea Eagles
Chanel Harris-Tavita	3 April 1999 (aged 27)	10	20	New Zealand Warriors
Eddie Ieremia-Toeava	15 December 2004 (aged 21)	0	0	New Zealand Warriors
Benaiah Ioelu	23 February 2004 (aged 22)	3	0	(Australia) Sydney Roosters
Connelly Lemuelu	7 July 1998 (aged 28)	1	0	(Australia) Dolphins
Spencer Leniu	8 September 2000 (aged 26)	7	0	(Australia) Sydney Roosters
Jarome Luai (c)	16 January 1997 (aged 29)	16	12	(Australia) Wests Tigers
Francis Manuleleua	24 May 2004 (aged 22)	0	0	(Australia) Newcastle Knights
Deine Mariner	25 April 2003 (aged 23)	5	12	(Australia) Brisbane Broncos
Ata Mariota	28 December 2001 (aged 24)	1	0	(Australia) Canberra Raiders
Jermaine McEwen	6 April 2005 (aged 21)	0	0	(Australia) Newcastle Knights
Francis Molo	3 September 1994 (aged 32)	6	0	(Australia) Dolphins
Junior Paulo (c)	20 November 1993 (aged 32)	20	12	(Australia) Parramatta Eels
Pasami Saulo	1 August 1998 (aged 28)	0	0	(Australia) Newcastle Knights
Hamiso Tabuai-Fidow	5 September 2001 (aged 25)	1	0	(Australia) Dolphins
Izack Tago	5 April 2002 (aged 24)	7	12	(Australia) Penrith Panthers
Jazz Tevaga	4 September 1995 (aged 31)	10	4	(England) Wakefield Trinity
Brian To'o	18 August 1998 (aged 28)	11	24	(Australia) Penrith Panthers
Enari Tuala	19 October 1998 (aged 27)	0	0	(Australia) Canterbury-Bankstown Bulldogs
Ronald Volkman	4 April 2002 (aged 24)	1	0	(Australia) Parramatta Eels

== Pool C ==
In the initial three rounds, each team in Pool C plays matches against each of the three teams in Pool B.

=== France ===
Head coach: (France) Laurent Frayssinous

France announced their 23-man squad on 1 October 2026. Jowasa Drodrolagi represented Fiji at the 2021 World Cup, switching to France on residency grounds.

Player	Date of birth (age)	Games	Points	Club
Guillermo Aispuro-Bichet	12 July 2005 (aged 21)	4	12	(France) Catalans Dragons
Lambert Belmas	11 August 1997 (aged 29)	7	0	(France) Toulouse Olympique
Amir Bourouh	5 January 2001 (aged 25)	0	0	(England) Hull FC
Julian Bousquet	8 July 1991 (aged 35)	17	8	(France) Catalans Dragons
Tiaki Chan	15 June 2000 (aged 26)	4	4	(France) Toulouse Olympique
Mathieu Cozza	12 April 2000 (aged 26)	2	0	(England) Huddersfield Giants
Alrix Da Costa	2 October 1997 (aged 29)	10	8	(France) Catalans Dragons
Léo Darrelatour	8 September 2000 (aged 26)	1	4	(France) Catalans Dragons
Jordan Dezaria	6 November 1996 (aged 29)	6	4	(England) Hull Kingston Rovers
Joe Drodrolagi	12 April 1995 (aged 31)	0	0	(France) Carcassonne XIII
Théo Fages	23 August 1994 (aged 32)	18	16	(France) Pia XIII Baroudeurs
Benjamin Garcia	5 April 1993 (aged 33)	17	12	(France) Catalans Dragons
Louis Grossemy	13 March 2003 (aged 23)	1	0	(France) Toulouse Olympique
Mathieu Jussaume	17 May 1999 (aged 27)	1	0	(France) Toulouse Olympique
Thomas Lacans	7 December 2000 (aged 25)	1	0	(France) Toulouse Olympique
Benjamin Laguerre	13 September 2001 (aged 25)	0	0	(France) Toulouse Olympique
Arthur Mourgue	2 May 1999 (aged 27)	8	4	(England) Hull Kingston Rovers
Romain Navarette	30 June 1994 (aged 32)	8	4	(France) Catalans Dragons
Arthur Romano	17 August 1997 (aged 29)	10	12	(England) Hull FC
César Rougé	3 October 2002 (aged 24)	7	24	(France) Toulouse Olympique
Latrell Siegwalt	7 May 2001 (aged 25)	0	0	(Australia) South Sydney Rabbitohs
Roméo Tropis	8 May 2005 (aged 21)	1	0	(France) Toulouse Olympique
Fouad Yaha	19 August 1996 (aged 30)	14	16	(France) Albi RL XIII

=== Papua New Guinea ===
Head coach: (Australia) Jason Demetriou

Papua New Guinea announced their 23-man squad on 6 October 2026. Alex Max, Kyle Laybutt and Jacob Taulani were named as shadow players.

Player	Date of birth (age)	Games	Points	Club
Jack de Belin	17 March 1991 (aged 35)	8	0	(Australia) Parramatta Eels
Robert Derby	7 March 2002 (aged 24)	8	32	(Australia) North Queensland Cowboys
Dudley Dotoi	12 September 2003 (aged 23)	1	4	(Australia) Townsville Blackhawks
Josh Feledy	7 September 2004 (aged 22)	0	0	(Australia) Manly Warringah Sea Eagles
Finley Glare	11 October 2003 (aged 23)	2	0	(England) London Broncos
Liam Horne	3 February 1998 (aged 28)	7	0	(England) Leigh Leopards
Edwin Ipape	2 February 1999 (aged 27)	11	12	(England) Leigh Leopards
Zev John	14 June 1998 (aged 28)	1	0	(Australia) Central Queensland Capras
Epel Kapinias	5 January 1998 (aged 28)	6	12	(England) London Broncos
Bailey Biondi-Odo	6 December 2001 (aged 24)	0	0	(Australia) Townsville Blackhawks
Zac Laybutt	16 January 2002 (aged 24)	5	24	(Australia) North Queensland Cowboys
Nene Macdonald	11 May 1994 (aged 32)	21	52	(England) St Helens
Rhyse Martin	1 March 1993 (aged 33)	21	172	(England) Hull Kingston Rovers
Robert Mathias	4 April 2003 (aged 23)	4	4	(England) London Broncos
Morea Morea	3 June 2001 (aged 25)	3	12	(England) London Broncos
Luca Moretti	19 April 2000 (aged 26)	0	0	(Australia) Parramatta Eels
Sylvester Namo	26 August 2000 (aged 26)	9	12	(Papua New Guinea) PNG Hunters
Nixon Putt	3 March 1996 (aged 30)	15	20	(Australia) Central Queensland Capras
Rodrick Tai	21 December 1998 (aged 27)	9	8	(Australia) Central Queensland Capras
Valentine Richard	3 March 1997 (aged 29)	7	4	(Australia) Central Queensland Capras
Gairo Voro	7 June 2003 (aged 23)	2	4	(England) London Broncos
Sanny Wabo	10 April 1999 (aged 27)	0	0	(Papua New Guinea) PNG Hunters
Khaiya Waiembi		0	0	(Australia) Central Queensland Capras

=== Tonga ===
Head coach: (Australia) Kristian Woolf

Tonga announced their 24-man squad on 6 October 2026, with one player to be omitted. On 9 October, Moeaki Fotuaika was cut from the final squad.

Player	Date of birth (age)	Games	Points	Club
Paul Alamoti	22 January 2004 (aged 22)	4	0	(Australia) Penrith Panthers
Junior Amone	10 April 2002 (aged 24)	3	4	(Australia) Wynnum Manly Seagulls
Latu Fainu	28 May 2005 (aged 21)	1	0	(Australia) Wests Tigers
Jojo Fifita	8 January 2003 (aged 23)	0	0	(Australia) Gold Coast Titans
Kulikefu Finefeuiaki	21 December 2003 (aged 22)	1	0	(Australia) Dolphins
Salesi Foketi	11 April 2004 (aged 22)	0	0	(Australia) Sydney Roosters
Addin Fonua-Blake (c)	6 November 1995 (aged 30)	18	4	(Australia) Cronulla-Sutherland Sharks
Tyson Frizell	9 October 1991 (aged 35)	3	4	(Australia) Newcastle Knights
Leka Halasima	21 September 2005 (aged 21)	1	0	New Zealand Warriors
Lehi Hopoate	26 January 2005 (aged 21)	5	0	(Australia) Manly Warringah Sea Eagles
Isaiya Katoa	18 February 2004 (aged 22)	11	75	(Australia) Dolphins
Sione Katoa	21 August 1997 (aged 29)	10	16	(Australia) Cronulla-Sutherland Sharks
Toluta'u Koula	2 September 2002 (aged 24)	8	12	(Australia) Manly Warringah Sea Eagles
Tuimoala Lolohea	23 January 1995 (aged 31)	22	32	(England) Huddersfield Giants
Soni Luke	25 February 1996 (aged 30)	10	4	(Australia) North Queensland Cowboys
Haumole Olakau'atu	1 October 1998 (aged 28)	8	4	(Australia) Manly Warringah Sea Eagles
Taniela Paseka	8 October 1997 (aged 29)	3	0	(Australia) Manly Warringah Sea Eagles
Jason Taumalolo (c)	31 May 1993 (aged 33)	20	16	(Australia) North Queensland Cowboys
Robert Toia	11 August 2004 (aged 22)	1	0	(Australia) Sydney Roosters
Stefano Utoikamanu	15 May 2000 (aged 26)	1	0	(Australia) Melbourne Storm
Demitric Vaimauga	15 March 2004 (aged 22)	2	4	New Zealand Warriors
Dallin Watene-Zelezniak	17 August 1995 (aged 31)	0	0	New Zealand Warriors
Siua Wong	4 April 2003 (aged 23)	5	0	(Australia) Sydney Roosters

== Representation by club ==
=== Player representation by club ===
Players	Clubs
14	New Zealand Warriors
13	(Australia) Sydney Roosters
12	(Australia) Dolphins (Australia) Penrith Panthers
11	(Australia) Manly Warringah Sea Eagles (Australia) Melbourne Storm (France) Toulouse Olympique
10	(Australia) Parramatta Eels (Australia) Wests Tigers
9	(Australia) Newcastle Knights
8	(Australia) South Sydney Rabbitohs (England) Wigan Warriors
7	(Australia) Brisbane Broncos (Australia) Canterbury-Bankstown Bulldogs (Australia) Cronulla-Sutherland Sharks (Australia) North Queensland Cowboys
6	(France) Catalans Dragons (Australia) Gold Coast Titans
5	(Australia) Central Queensland Capras (England) Hull Kingston Rovers (England) London Broncos
4	(Australia) Canberra Raiders
3	(England) Huddersfield Giants (Australia) Newtown Jets (Australia) St. George Illawarra Dragons (England) Warrington Wolves
2	(England) Bradford Bulls (Australia) Brisbane Tigers (England) Hull FC (England) Leigh Leopards (Papua New Guinea) PNG Hunters (England) St Helens (Australia) Townsville Blackhawks
1	(France) Albi RL XIII (Australia) Burleigh Bears (France) Carcassonne XIII (England) Castleford Tigers (Australia) Glebe Dirty Reds (England) Leeds Rhinos (Australia) Mackay Cutters (Australia) North Sydney Bears (Australia) Northern Pride (Australia) Norths Devils (France) Pia XIII Baroudeurs (Australia) Shellharbour Stingrays (Australia) Souths Logan Magpies (Australia) St Marys Saints (Australia) Sunshine Coast Falcons (England) Wakefield Trinity (Australia) Wentworthville Magpies (Australia) Wynnum Manly Seagulls

== See also ==
- 2026 Men's Rugby League World Cup
- 2026 Men's Rugby League World Cup statistics
- 2026 Women's Rugby League World Cup squads
- 2026 Wheelchair Rugby League World Cup squads
