= 2026 Men's Rugby League World Cup Pool A =

Rugby League World Cup results

Pool A of the 2026 Rugby League World Cup was one of the three groups in the 2026 Rugby League World Cup. The group comprised hosts Australia and New Zealand, as well as automatic qualifiers Fiji, and Cook Islands, who qualified through the Southern Hemisphere play-offs.

== Teams ==
Team	Method of qualification	Date of qualification	Total times qualified	Last time qualified	Current consecutive appearances	Previous best performance
New Zealand	2021 World Cup Group C winners	28 October 2022	17	2021	17	Winners (2008)
Australia	2021 World Cup Group B winners	29 October 2022	17	2021	17	Winners (12 times)
Fiji	2021 World Cup Group B runners-up	29 October 2022	7	2021	7	Semi-finals (2008, 2013, 2017)
Cook Islands	Southern Hemisphere play-off winners	9 November 2025	4	2021	2	Group Stage (2000, 2013, 2021)

== Standings ==
Pos	Team	Pld	W	D	L	PF	PA	PD	Pts	Qualification
1	Australia (H)	3	3	0	0	126	50	+76	6	Advance to knockout stage
2	New Zealand (H)	3	2	0	1	182	40	+142	4	Advance to knockout stage
3	Fiji	3	1	0	2	62	126	−64	2	
4	Cook Islands	3	0	0	3	34	188	−154	0	

Source: Source
Rules for classification: Pool stage tiebreakers
(H) Hosts

In the semi-finals:

- The winner of Group A, Australia, advanced to play the runner-up team of Pool B & C, Samoa.
- The runner-up of Group A, New Zealand, advanced to play the winner of Pool B & C, Tonga.

== Matches ==
=== Australia vs New Zealand ===
15 October 2026
20:05 AEDT (UTC+11:00)

Australia	24–22	New Zealand
Tries: 5 Bostock 19', 56', 75'; Trbojevic 30'; Walsh 68'; Goals: 2 Walsh (2/4) 32', 57'; Mitchell (0/1); Sin bin: Staggs (yellow card) 37' to 47'	1st: 10–10; 2nd: 14–12; Report (NRL); Report (IRL)	Tries: 3 McLean 3'; Ponga 46', 59'; Goals: 5 Isaako (5/5) 5', pen 25', pen 38', 48', 61'

Sydney Football Stadium, Sydney
Attendance: 41,255
Referee: Adam Gee (Australia)
Video referee: Chris Butler (Australia)
Touch judges: Matt Noyen (Australia), Tyson Brough (Australia)
Player of the Match: Jack Bostock (Australia)

Team lists:

FB	1	Reece Walsh
WG	2	Jack Bostock
CE	3	Latrell Mitchell
CE	4	Kotoni Staggs
WG	5	Tom Trbojevic
FE	6	Cameron Munster
HB	7	Mitchell Moses
PR	8	Patrick Carrigan
HK	9	Harry Grant
PR	10	Tino Fa'asuamaleaui
SR	11	Jacob Preston
SR	12	Liam Martin
LK	13	Isaah Yeo (c)
Substitutions:
IC	14	Tom Dearden
IC	15	Cameron Murray
IC	16	Reuben Cotter
IC	17	Keaon Koloamatangi
Coach:
(Australia) Kevin Walters

FB	1	Kalyn Ponga
WG	2	Jamayne Isaako
CE	3	Dane Gagai
CE	4	Casey McLean
WG	5	Ronaldo Mulitalo
FE	6	Kodi Nikorima
HB	7	Jahrome Hughes
PR	8	James Fisher-Harris (c)
HK	9	Jeremy Marshall-King
PR	10	Moses Leota
SR	11	Isaiah Papali'i
SR	12	Briton Nikora
LK	13	Joseph Tapine
Substitutions:
IC	15	Leo Thompson
IC	16	Erin Clark
IC	17	Xavier Willison
IC	19	Keano Kini
Coach:
(New Zealand) Stacey Jones

=== Fiji vs Cook Islands ===
18 October 2026
16:05 AEDT (UTC+11:00)

Fiji	40–12	Cook Islands
Tries: 7 Saukuru 5', 69'; Blake 12'; Saifiti 28'; Milne 35'; Navale 37'; Kautoga 47'; Goals: 6 Wakeham (6/7) 7', 13', 30', 36', 48', 71'	1st: 28–0; 2nd: 12–12; Report (NRL); Report (IRL)	Tries: 2 Winitana-Patelesio 59'; Moale 63'; Goals: 2 Winitana-Patelesio (2/2) 60', 64'

Newcastle International Sports Centre, Newcastle
Attendance: 10,604
Referee: Chris Kendall (England)
Video referee: Wyatt Raymond (Australia)
Touch judges: Drew Oultram (Australia), Jon Stone (Australia)
Player of the Match: Brandon Wakeham (Fiji)

Team lists:

FB	1	Bayleigh Bentley-Hape
WG	2	Sunia Turuva
CE	3	Waqa Blake
CE	4	Solomone Saukuru
WG	5	Semi Valemei
FE	6	Kurt Donoghoe
HB	7	Brandon Wakeham
PR	8	Jacob Saifiti
HK	9	Apisai Koroisau (c)
PR	10	Mitchell Prest
SR	11	Taane Milne
SR	12	Kitione Kautoga
LK	13	Caleb Navale
Substitutions:
IC	14	Josese Lanyon
IC	15	Emosi Ravosai
IC	16	Elijah Keung
IC	19	Jordin Leiu
Coach:
(Australia) Mick Potter

FB	1	Esom Ioka
WG	2	Paul Ulberg
CE	3	KL Iro (c)
CE	4	Reubenn Rennie
WG	5	Cameron Brown
FE	6	Maui Winitana-Patelesio
HB	7	Esan Marsters
PR	8	Davvy Moale
HK	9	Mason Teague
PR	10	Makahesi Makatoa
SR	11	Reuben Porter
SR	12	Delahia Wigmore
LK	13	Pride Petterson-Robati
Substitutions:
IC	14	Rua Ngatikaura
IC	15	K-Ci Newton-Whare
IC	17	Brad Takairangi
IC	19	Chaev Kolone
Coach:
(Australia) Karmichael Hunt

=== New Zealand vs Cook Islands ===
25 October 2026
18:05 NZDT (UTC+12:00)

New Zealand	82–16	Cook Islands
Tries: 14; Isaako 1', 23', 73'; Mulitalo 6', 64'; Sorensen 27'; Stowers-Smith 32', 49'; McLean 37', 58'; Kini 42'; Nikorima 51'; Martin 76'; Nicoll-Klokstad 77'; Goals: 13; Isaako (13/14) 3', 8', 24', 28', 34', 39', 44', 50', 53', 58', 75', 76', 78'	1st: 36–16; 2nd: 46–0; Report (NRL); Report (IRL)	Tries: 3 Ioka 10', 14', 18'; Goals: 2 Holmes (2/3) 16', 19'

Te Kaha Stadium, Christchurch
Attendance: 24,868 (Note: Match attendance was posted as 26,800 by several difference sources, but NRL website lists it officially as 24,868)
Referee: Ashley Klein (Australia)
Video referee: Wyatt Raymond
Touch judges: Jon Stone (Australia), Drew Oultram (Australia)
Player of the Match: Casey McLean (New Zealand)

Team lists:

FB	1	Keano Kini
WG	2	Jamayne Isaako
CE	3	Charnze Nicoll-Klokstad
CE	4	Casey McLean
WG	5	Ronaldo Mulitalo
FE	6	Kodi Nikorima
HB	7	Jahrome Hughes
PR	8	James Fisher-Harris (c)
HK	9	Jeremy Marshall-King
PR	10	Joseph Tapine
SR	11	Xavier Willison
SR	12	Scott Sorensen
LK	13	Erin Clark
Substitutions:
IC	14	Te Maire Martin
IC	15	Leo Thompson
IC	16	Tanner Stowers-Smith
IC	17	Jacob Laban
Coach:
(New Zealand) Stacey Jones

FB	1	Valentine Holmes
WG	2	Esom Ioka
CE	3	KL Iro (c)
CE	4	Reubenn Rennie
WG	5	Cameron Brown
FE	6	Maui Winitana-Patelesio
HB	17	Brad Takairangi
PR	8	Davvy Moale
HK	9	Rua Ngatikaura
PR	10	Rhys Dakin
SR	11	Amare Milford
SR	12	Delahia Wigmore
LK	13	Mason Teague
Substitutions:
IC	7	Esan Marsters
IC	14	K-Ci Newton-Whare
IC	15	David Tuariki
IC	16	Makahesi Makatoa
Coach:
(Australia) Karmichael Hunt

=== Australia vs Fiji ===
25 October 2026
19:05 AEST (UTC+10:00)

Australia	36–22	Fiji
Tries: 6 Staggs 7'; Walker 33'; Trbojevic 47', 57', 62'; Preston 76'; Goals: 6 Walker (6/7) 9', 34', pen 54', 58', 63', 78'	1st: 12–10; 2nd: 24–12; Report (NRL); Report (IRL)	Tries: 4 Valemei 17', 43', 69'; Milne 25'; Goals: 3 Wakeham (3/4) 26', 44', 71'

Lang Park, Brisbane
Attendance: 41,108
Referee: Gerard Sutton (Australia)
Video referee: Chris Butler (Australia)
Touch judges: Nick Pelgrave (Australia), Michael Wise (Australia)
Player of the Match: Kurt Donoghoe (Fiji)

Team lists:

FB	1	James Tedesco (c)
WG	2	Jack Bostock
CE	3	Kotoni Staggs
CE	4	Bradman Best
WG	5	Tom Trbojevic
FE	6	Tom Dearden
HB	7	Sam Walker
PR	8	Keaon Koloamatangi
HK	9	Blayke Brailey
PR	10	Lindsay Smith
SR	11	David Fifita
SR	12	Reuben Cotter
LK	13	Cameron Murray
Substitutions:
IC	14	Tino Fa'asuamaleaui
IC	15	Jacob Preston
IC	16	Patrick Carrigan
Coach:
(Australia) Kevin Walters

FB	1	Bayleigh Bentley-Hape
WG	2	Sunia Turuva
CE	3	Waqa Blake
CE	4	Solomone Saukuru
WG	5	Semi Valemei
FE	6	Kurt Donoghoe
HB	7	Brandon Wakeham
PR	8	Jacob Saifiti
HK	9	Apisai Koroisau (c)
PR	10	Mitchell Prest
SR	11	Taane Milne
SR	12	Kitione Kautoga
LK	13	Caleb Navale
Substitutions:
IC	14	Josese Lanyon
IC	15	Emosi Ravosai
IC	17	Ronald Philitoga
IC	18	Jordin Leiu
Coach:
(Fiji) Mick Potter

=== New Zealand vs Fiji ===
31 October 2026
14:45 AEST (UTC+10:00)

New Zealand	78–0	Fiji
Tries: 13; Hughes 1'; Kini 4', 78'; McLean 8', 25', 55', 61'; Gagai 11'; Fisher-Harris 19'; Mulitalo 29'; Willison 32'; Nikora 63'; Clark 72'; Goals: 13; Isaako (13/13) 3', 5', 10', 12', 21', 26', 30', 34', 57', 62', 65', 73', 79'; Sent off: Mulitalo (red card) 51'	1st: 48–0; 2nd: 30–0; Report (NRL); Report (IRL)	Sin bin: Miller (yellow card) 77' to 80'; Sent off: Wakeham (red card) 51'

Robina Stadium, Gold Coast
Attendance: 23,659
Referee: Grant Atkins (Australia)
Video referee: Todd Smith (Australia)
Touch judges: Jarrod Cole (Australia), Kieren Irons (Australia)
Player of the Match: Naufahu Whyte (New Zealand)

Team lists:

FB	1	Keano Kini
WG	2	Jamayne Isaako
CE	3	Dane Gagai
CE	4	Casey McLean
WG	5	Ronaldo Mulitalo
FE	6	Kodi Nikorima
HB	7	Jahrome Hughes
PR	8	James Fisher-Harris (c)
HK	9	Jeremy Marshall-King
PR	10	Moses Leota
SR	11	Isaiah Papali'i
SR	12	Briton Nikora
LK	13	Joseph Tapine
Substitutions:
IC	14	Te Maire Martin
IC	15	Naufahu Whyte
IC	16	Erin Clark
IC	17	Xavier Willison
Coach:
(New Zealand) Stacey Jones

FB	1	Sunia Turuva
WG	2	Ronald Philitoga
CE	3	Waqa Blake
CE	4	Solomone Saukuru
WG	5	Semi Valemei
FE	6	Kurt Donoghoe
HB	7	Brandon Wakeham
PR	8	Jacob Saifiti
HK	9	Apisai Koroisau (c)
PR	10	Emosi Ravosai
SR	11	Taane Milne
SR	12	Kitione Kautoga
LK	13	Caleb Navale
Substitutions:
IC	14	Josese Lanyon
IC	15	Jordan Miller
IC	16	Elijah Keung
IC	17	Joseph Litidamu
IC	19	Apenisa Driti
Coach:
(Australia) Mick Potter

=== Australia vs Cook Islands ===
31 October 2026
19:05 AEST (UTC+10:00)

Australia	66–6	Cook Islands
Tries: 12; Bostock 2', 44', 59'; Trbojevic 17', 47', 57'; Fa'asuamaleaui 20', 54'; Staggs 26'; Walsh 30'; Preston 51'; Grant 77'; Goals: 9 Walsh (3/4) 18', 21', 27'; Munster (5/7) 32', 46', 53', 56', 58'; Strange (1/1) 79'	1st: 28–6; 2nd: 38–0; Report (NRL); Report (IRL)	Tries: 1 Ngatikaura 8'; Goals: 1 Holmes (1/1) 10'

North Queensland Stadium, Townsville
Attendance: 19,172
Referee: Ashley Klein (Australia)
Video referee: Chris Butler (Australia)
Touch judges: Michael Wise (Australia), Nick Pelgrave (Australia)
Player of the Match: Reece Walsh (Australia)

Team lists:

FB	1	Reece Walsh
WG	2	Jack Bostock
CE	3	Kotoni Staggs
CE	4	Bradman Best
WG	5	Tom Trbojevic
FE	6	Cameron Munster
HB	7	Tom Dearden
PR	8	Patrick Carrigan
HK	9	Harry Grant
PR	10	Tino Fa'asuamaleaui
SR	11	Jacob Preston
SR	12	Liam Martin
LK	13	Isaah Yeo
Substitutions:
IC	14	Ethan Strange
IC	15	Keaon Koloamatangi
IC	16	Reuben Cotter
IC	19	Lindsay Smith
Coach:
(Australia) Kevin Walters

FB	1	Valentine Holmes
WG	2	Cameron Brown
CE	3	KL Iro (c)
CE	4	Reubenn Rennie
WG	5	Esan Marsters
FE	6	Maui Winitana-Patelesio
HB	7	Brad Takairangi
PR	8	Davvy Moale
HK	9	Rua Ngatikaura
PR	10	Rhys Dakin
SR	11	Chaev Kolone
SR	12	Delahia Wigmore
LK	13	Mason Teague
Substitutions:
IC	14	David Tuariki
IC	15	Makahesi Makatoa
IC	16	Pride Petterson-Robati
IC	17	Amare Milford
Coach:
(Australia) Karmichael Hunt

== See also ==
- 2026 Men's Rugby League World Cup squads
- 2026 Men's Rugby League World Cup statistics
