= 2026 Men's Rugby League World Cup final =

Rugby league match to determine the winner of the 2026 Men's Rugby League World Cup

Australia	New Zealand
(ARL)	(NZRL)
32	12
	1	2	Total
AUS	24	8	32
NZL	6	6	12
- Date: 15 November 2026
- Stadium: Lang Park
- Location: Brisbane, Australia
- Man of the Match: Jack Bostock
- Referee: Grant Atkins
- Attendance: 52,461

Broadcast partners
- Broadcasters: Seven Network (Australia) Sky Sport (New Zealand)

The 2026 Men's Rugby League World Cup final was the rugby league match to determine the winner of the 2026 Men's Rugby League World Cup, played between Australia and New Zealand on 15 November 2026 at Lang Park in Brisbane, Australia. Australia won 32–12, winning their thirteenth World Cup.

== Background ==
The 2026 Men's Rugby League World Cup was the 17th staging of the World Cup, the IRL's rugby league competition for national teams. The tournament was held in Australia, New Zealand, and Papua New Guinea from 15 October 2026 to 19 November 2026. 10 teams are competing in the tournament, a decrease of six from the previous tournament and the first to feature just 10 teams since the 2008 Rugby League World Cup.

== Venue ==
View of Lang Park at kickoff of the final

Lang Park will host the final for the third time, having previously hosted in 2008, when New Zealand beat Australia 34–20, and 2017, when Australia beat England 6–0. It was confirmed as the host venue on 23 November 2025, alongside all the fixtures for the 2026 tournament. Alongside this match, Lang Park also hosted a pool stage match, where Australia beat Fiji 34–22 in front of 41,108 fans.

The ground comprises a three-tiered rectangular sporting stadium with a capacity of 52,500 people and a rectangular playing field of 136 by 82 metres (446 by 269 ft). On top of regular international fixtures, Lang Park is also the main home ground for the Brisbane Broncos and Dolphins in the National Rugby League, whilst also hosting Magic Round annually in May. Furthermore, it hosts a State of Origin game every year, serving as Queensland's home ground as Queensland rugby league's traditional home.

Aside from rugby league, it also hosts the Brisbane Roar in soccer's A-League Men and Queensland Reds in rugby union's Super Rugby, alongside international fixtures in these sports as well. It hosted matches at the 2003 Rugby World Cup, 2015 AFC Asian Cup, and 2023 FIFA Women's World Cup, and will do so at the 2027 Rugby World Cup alongside events for the 2032 Summer Olympics.

== Route to the final ==
=== Summary ===
Australia		Round	New Zealand	
Opponent	Result	Group stage	Opponent	Result
New Zealand	24–22	Matchday 1	Australia	22–24
Fiji	34–22	Matchday 2	Cook Islands	82–16
Cook Islands	66–6	Matchday 3	Fiji	78–0
Pool stage winners: Pos / Team / Pld / Pts; 1 / Australia (H) / 3 / 6; 2 / New Zealand (H) / 3 / 4; 3 / Fiji / 3 / 2; 4 / Cook Islands / 3 / 0; Source: Source (H) Hosts		Final standings	Pool stage runners-up: Pos / Team / Pld / Pts; 1 / Australia (H) / 3 / 6; 2 / New Zealand (H) / 3 / 4; 3 / Fiji / 3 / 2; 4 / Cook Islands / 3 / 0; Source: Source (H) Hosts	
Opponent	Result	Knockout stage	Opponent	Result
Samoa	44–12	Semi-finals	Tonga	34–10

== Pre-match ==
=== Women's final ===
The match will be played as a double-header with the women's final between New Zealand and Australia for the third time in the tournament's history, and the second time in Australia. Australia won the match 34–6.

== Match ==
=== Details ===
2026 Men's Rugby League World Cup Final

Sunday, 15 November
18:35 AEST (UTC+10:00)

Australia	32–12	New Zealand
Tries: 6 Martin 1', 37'; Bostock 18', 76'; Best 31'; Trbojevic 42'; Goals: 4 Munster 3', pen 23', 32', 39' (4/7)	1st: 24–6; 2nd: 8–6; Report (NRL); Report (IRL)	Tries: 2 McLean 11'; Papali'i 65'; Goals: 2 Isaako 13', 66' (2/2)

Lang Park, Brisbane
Attendance: 52,461
Referee: Grant Atkins (Australia)
Video referee: Wyatt Raymond (Australia)
Touch judges: Matt Noyen (Australia), Tyson Brough (Australia)
Player of the Match: Jack Bostock (Australia)

Australia	New Zealand

Team details
Australia		Position	New Zealand
Name	Number	Position	Number	Name
Reece Walsh	1	Fullback	1	Kalyn Ponga
Jack Bostock	2	Wing	2	Jamayne Isaako
Kotoni Staggs	3	Centre	3	Dane Gagai
Bradman Best	4	Centre	4	Casey McLean
Tom Trbojevic	5	Wing	5	Ronaldo Mulitalo
Cameron Munster	6	Five eighth	6	Kodi Nikorima
Tom Dearden	7	Half back	7	Jahrome Hughes
Tino Fa'asuamaleaui	10	Prop forward	8	James Fisher-Harris (c)
Harry Grant	9	Hooker	9	Jeremy Marshall-King
Keaon Koloamatangi	15	Prop forward	10	Moses Leota
Jacob Preston	11	Second row	11	Isaiah Papali'i
Liam Martin	12	Second row	12	Briton Nikora
Isaah Yeo (c)	13	Lock forward	13	Joseph Tapine
Patrick Carrigan	8	Interchange	15	Naufahu Whyte
Cameron Murray	16	Interchange	16	Erin Clark
Reuben Cotter	17	Interchange	17	Xavier Willison
James Tedesco	22	Interchange	19	Phoenix Crossland
Ethan Strange	14	Reserve	14	Te Maire Martin
Sam Walker	19	Reserve	20	Charnze Nicoll-Klokstad
(Australia) Kevin Walters		Coach		(New Zealand) Stacey Jones

== Broadcasting ==
In Australia, the match was broadcast on Channel 7. In New Zealand, the match was broadcast on Sky Sport.

== See also ==
- 2026 Women's Rugby League World Cup final
- 2026 Wheelchair Rugby League World Cup final
