= 2026 Men's Rugby League World Cup =

- Number of teams: 10
- Host countries: Australia; Papua New Guinea; New Zealand
- Winner: Australia (13th title)
- Runner-up: New Zealand
- Matches played: 18
- Attendance: 422,738 (23,485 per match)
- Points scored: 1048 (58.22 per match)
- Tries scored: 184 (10.22 per match)
- Top scorer: (New Zealand) Jamayne Isaako (88)
- Top try scorer: (New Zealand) Casey McLean (9) (Australia) Jack Bostock (9) (Australia) Tom Trbojevic (9)

The 2026 Men's Rugby League World Cup was the seventeenth staging of the Rugby League World Cup, and was one of three major tournaments which make up the 2026 Rugby League World Cup.

The competition was to be held in October and November 2025, but was moved to 2026 following the withdrawal of France as the host nation. The competition ran in parallel with the women's and wheelchair tournaments.

== Format ==
Due to the rescheduling, the competition featured 10 teams, similar to the 1995 and 2008 editions, reduced from 16. This was done partly to aid in the late rescheduling of the tournament, but also to boost commercial appeal of the tournament after criticism of blowout scorelines in the early stages of the 2021 World Cup.

== Host selection ==
The International Rugby League (IRL) originally decided in 2016 to have the tournaments hosted in the United States and Canada. In December 2019 however, the IRL withdrew the hosting rights due to the promoters, Moore Sports International, being unable to guarantee the staging of the tournaments.

After re-opening the bidding to host the tournaments, the IRL awarded the hosting rights to France. On 15 May 2023, the France 2025 organising committee was forced to withdraw from hosting the tournament, due to financial concerns from the new French government elected in May 2022.

On 3 August 2023 it was confirmed that the tournament would be moved to 2026 and held in the Southern Hemisphere. On 24 July 2024, the IRL announced that Australia would host the 2026 tournament, with a number of games played in Papua New Guinea.

== Teams ==
=== Qualification ===
On 3 August 2023, the date the tournament was announced, the eight quarter-finalists of the 2021 World Cup (who were all previously qualified for the cancelled 2025 World Cup) were confirmed to have qualified for the tournament. The qualification process for the remaining two slots was announced on 7 October 2023, and ran from 2024 to 2025.

| Team | Method of qualification | Date of qualification | Total times qualified | Last time qualified | Current consecutive appearances | Previous best performance |
|---|---|---|---|---|---|---|
| New Zealand | 2021 World Cup Group C winners | 28 October 2022 | 17 | 2021 | 17 | Winners (2008) |
| England | 2021 World Cup Group A winners | 29 October 2022 | 8 (Note: Competed as part of Great Britain in nine previous tournaments, finishing as champions on three occasions (1954, 1960, 1972).) | 2021 | 8 | Runners-up (1975, 1995, 2017) |
| Australia | 2021 World Cup Group B winners | 29 October 2022 | 17 | 2021 | 17 | Winners (12 times) |
| Fiji | 2021 World Cup Group B runners-up | 29 October 2022 | 7 | 2021 | 7 | Semi-finals (2008, 2013, 2017) |
| Lebanon (Note: On 14 March 2024, Lebanon had their membership downgraded from full to affiliate member, however as Lebanon had already qualified for the World Cup, their tournament status is unaffected.) | 2021 World Cup Group C runners-up | 30 October 2022 | 4 | 2021 | 3 | Quarter-finals (2017, 2021) |
| Tonga | 2021 World Cup Group D winners | 30 October 2022 | 7 | 2021 | 7 | Semi-finals (2017) |
| Samoa | 2021 World Cup Group A runners-up | 30 October 2022 | 7 | 2021 | 7 | Runners-up (2021) |
| Papua New Guinea | 2021 World Cup Group D runners-up | 31 October 2022 | 9 | 2021 | 9 | Quarter-finals (2000, 2017, 2021) |
| France | Northern Hemisphere play-off winners | 25 October 2025 | 17 | 2021 | 17 | Runners-up (1954, 1968) |
| Cook Islands | Southern Hemisphere play-off winners | 9 November 2025 | 4 | 2021 | 2 | Group Stage (2000, 2013, 2021) |

=== Draw ===
Australia and New Zealand played in the opening game at the Sydney Football Stadium on 15 October. Samoa and Tonga also faced each other in the group stage to replicate their successful 2025 Pacific Championship match, which was played at the Western Sydney Stadium. The draw was announced on 23 November 2025.

=== Squads ===
In early October 2026, teams announced squads of 23 players to represent their nation at the tournament, with some nations adding shadow players in case of injury.

== Venues ==
| Australia | | | | New Zealand |
| Brisbane | Moore Park (Sydney) | Newcastle | Parramatta (Sydney) | Christchurch |
|---|---|---|---|---|
| Lang Park | Sydney Football Stadium | Newcastle International Sports Centre | Western Sydney Stadium | Te Kaha |
| Capacity: 52,500 | Capacity: 42,500 | Capacity: 33,000 | Capacity: 30,000 | Capacity: 25,000 |
Location of the 2026 Men's Rugby League World Cup venues: Australia; 1 Lang Park, Brisbane; 2 Sydney Football Stadium, Moore Park; 3 Newcastle International Sports Centre, Newcastle; 4 Western Sydney Stadium, Parramatta; 5 Robina Stadium, Robina; 6 Perth Rectangular Stadium, Perth; 7 North Queensland Stadium, Townsville; 8 Wollongong Showground, Wollongong; New Zealand; 9 Te Kaha; Papua New Guinea; 10 PNG Football Stadium
| Australia | | | | Papua New Guinea |
| Gold Coast | Perth | Townsville | Wollongong | Port Moresby |
| Robina Stadium | Perth Rectangular Stadium | North Queensland Stadium | Wollongong Showgrounds | National Stadium |
| Capacity: 27,400 | Capacity: 20,500 | Capacity: 25,455 | Capacity: 23,750 | Capacity: 14,800 |

== Officiating ==
=== Match officials ===
Match officials were announced on the National Rugby League website, along with team lists, on the Tuesday afternoon preceding matches.

| Match Official | Country | Men's tournament appearances | | | |
| Match Official | Country | Referee | Touch judge | Video referee | Total |
|---|---|---|---|---|---|
| Grant Atkins | Australia | 4 | 0 | 1 | 5 |
| Tyson Brough | Australia | 0 | 3 | 0 | 3 |
| Chris Butler | Australia | 0 | 0 | 7 | 7 |
| Jarrod Cole | Australia | 0 | 3 | 0 | 3 |
| Adam Gee | Australia | 4 | 0 | 0 | 4 |
| Kieren Irons | Australia | 0 | 3 | 0 | 3 |
| Chris Kendall | England | 2 | 0 | 0 | 2 |
| Liam Kennedy | Australia | 0 | 0 | 2 | 2 |
| Ashley Klein | Australia | 3 | 0 | 1 | 4 |
| Daniel Luttringer | Australia | 0 | 4 | 0 | 4 |
| Liam Moore | England | 2 | 0 | 0 | 2 |
| Dave Munro | Australia | 0 | 3 | 0 | 3 |
| Matt Noyen | Australia | 0 | 5 | 0 | 5 |
| Drew Oultram | Australia | 0 | 3 | 0 | 3 |
| Nick Pelgrave | Australia | 0 | 2 | 0 | 2 |
| Ziggy Przeklasa-Adamski | Australia | 0 | 4 | 0 | 4 |
| Wyatt Raymond | Australia | 0 | 0 | 4 | 4 |
| Todd Smith | Australia | 0 | 0 | 3 | 3 |
| Jon Stone | Australia | 0 | 3 | 0 | 3 |
| Gerard Sutton | Australia | 3 | 0 | 0 | 3 |
| Michael Wise | Australia | 0 | 3 | 0 | 3 |

== Pool stage ==
In October 2025, it was reported that the tournament would be played with one group of four and two groups of three, with the top two from Group A advancing to the semi-finals, and the top two teams advancing from the combined Groups B and C. Group A teams played each other once each, while each member of Group B played each member of Group C, and vice versa.

| Pool A | Pool B | Pool C |
|---|---|---|
| Australia Cook Islands Fiji New Zealand | England Lebanon Samoa | France Papua New Guinea Tonga |

Tie-breaking criteria for pool play
The ranking of tied teams in the pool stage is determined as follows:
1. Head-to-head result (between the tied teams, where applicable)
2. Points difference (overall or in relevant matchups)
3. Points scored (most points scored in the tournament/group matches)

For clarification, in the case of a tie between three or more Teams at the end of the pool phase, once the highest ranked Team has been determined following the above criteria, to determine the next higher ranked Team the process would repeat, starting at the first criterion.

=== Pool A ===
| Pos | Team | Pld | W | D | L | PF | PA | PD | Pts | Qualification |
|---|---|---|---|---|---|---|---|---|---|---|
| 1 | Australia (H) | 3 | 3 | 0 | 0 | 126 | 50 | +76 | 6 | Advance to knockout stage |
| 2 | New Zealand (H) | 3 | 2 | 0 | 1 | 182 | 40 | +142 | 4 | Advance to knockout stage |
| 3 | Fiji | 3 | 1 | 0 | 2 | 62 | 126 | −64 | 2 | |
| 4 | Cook Islands | 3 | 0 | 0 | 3 | 34 | 188 | −154 | 0 | |

Source: Source
Rules for classification: Pool stage tiebreakers
(H) Hosts

15 October 2026
20:05 AEDT (UTC+11:00)

| Australia | 24–22 | New Zealand |
|---|---|---|
| Tries: 5 Bostock 19', 56', 75'; Trbojevic 30'; Walsh 68'; Goals: 2 Walsh (2/4) 32', 57'; Mitchell (0/1); Sin bin: Staggs (yellow card) 37' to 47' | 1st: 10–10; 2nd: 14–12; Report (NRL); Report (IRL) | Tries: 3 McLean 3'; Ponga 46', 59'; Goals: 5 Isaako (5/5) 5', pen 25', pen 38', 48', 61' |

Sydney Football Stadium, Sydney
Attendance: 41,255
Referee: Adam Gee (Australia)
Video referee: Chris Butler (Australia)
Touch judges: Matt Noyen (Australia), Tyson Brough (Australia)
Player of the Match: Jack Bostock (Australia)

18 October 2026
16:05 AEDT (UTC+11:00)

| Fiji | 40–12 | Cook Islands |
|---|---|---|
| Tries: 7 Saukuru 5', 69'; Blake 12'; Saifiti 28'; Milne 35'; Navale 37'; Kautoga 47'; Goals: 6 Wakeham (6/7) 7', 13', 30', 36', 48', 71' | 1st: 28–0; 2nd: 12–12; Report (NRL); Report (IRL) | Tries: 2 Winitana-Patelesio 59'; Moale 63'; Goals: 2 Winitana-Patelesio (2/2) 60', 64' |

Newcastle International Sports Centre, Newcastle
Attendance: 10,604
Referee: Chris Kendall (England)
Video referee: Wyatt Raymond (Australia)
Touch judges: Drew Oultram (Australia), Jon Stone (Australia)
Player of the Match: Brandon Wakeham (Fiji)

25 October 2026
18:05 NZDT (UTC+12:00)

| New Zealand | 82–16 | Cook Islands |
|---|---|---|
| Tries: 14; Isaako 1', 23', 73'; Mulitalo 6', 64'; Sorensen 27'; Stowers-Smith 32', 49'; McLean 37', 58'; Kini 42'; Nikorima 51'; Martin 76'; Nicoll-Klokstad 77'; Goals: 13; Isaako (13/14) 3', 8', 24', 28', 34', 39', 44', 50', 53', 58', 75', 76', 78' | 1st: 36–16; 2nd: 46–0; Report (NRL); Report (IRL) | Tries: 3 Ioka 10', 14', 18'; Goals: 2 Holmes (2/3) 16', 19' |

Te Kaha Stadium, Christchurch
Attendance: 24,868 (Note: Match attendance was posted as 26,800 by several difference sources, but NRL website lists it officially as 24,868)
Referee: Ashley Klein (Australia)
Video referee: Wyatt Raymond
Touch judges: Jon Stone (Australia), Drew Oultram (Australia)
Player of the Match: Casey McLean (New Zealand)

25 October 2026
19:05 AEST (UTC+10:00)

| Australia | 36–22 | Fiji |
|---|---|---|
| Tries: 6 Staggs 7'; Walker 33'; Trbojevic 47', 57', 62'; Preston 76'; Goals: 6 Walker (6/7) 9', 34', pen 54', 58', 63', 78' | 1st: 12–10; 2nd: 24–12; Report (NRL); Report (IRL) | Tries: 4 Valemei 17', 43', 69'; Milne 25'; Goals: 3 Wakeham (3/4) 26', 44', 71' |

Lang Park, Brisbane
Attendance: 41,108
Referee: Gerard Sutton (Australia)
Video referee: Chris Butler (Australia)
Touch judges: Nick Pelgrave (Australia), Michael Wise (Australia)
Player of the Match: Kurt Donoghoe (Fiji)

31 October 2026
14:45 AEST (UTC+10:00)

| New Zealand | 78–0 | Fiji |
|---|---|---|
| Tries: 13; Hughes 1'; Kini 4', 78'; McLean 8', 25', 55', 61'; Gagai 11'; Fisher-Harris 19'; Mulitalo 29'; Willison 32'; Nikora 63'; Clark 72'; Goals: 13; Isaako (13/13) 3', 5', 10', 12', 21', 26', 30', 34', 57', 62', 65', 73', 79'; Sent off: Mulitalo (red card) 51' | 1st: 48–0; 2nd: 30–0; Report (NRL); Report (IRL) | Sin bin: Miller (yellow card) 77' to 80'; Sent off: Wakeham (red card) 51' |

Robina Stadium, Gold Coast
Attendance: 23,659
Referee: Grant Atkins (Australia)
Video referee: Todd Smith (Australia)
Touch judges: Jarrod Cole (Australia), Kieren Irons (Australia)
Player of the Match: Naufahu Whyte (New Zealand)

31 October 2026
19:05 AEST (UTC+10:00)

| Australia | 66–6 | Cook Islands |
|---|---|---|
| Tries: 12; Bostock 2', 44', 59'; Trbojevic 17', 47', 57'; Fa'asuamaleaui 20', 54'; Staggs 26'; Walsh 30'; Preston 51'; Grant 77'; Goals: 9 Walsh (3/4) 18', 21', 27'; Munster (5/7) 32', 46', 53', 56', 58'; Strange (1/1) 79' | 1st: 28–6; 2nd: 38–0; Report (NRL); Report (IRL) | Tries: 1 Ngatikaura 8'; Goals: 1 Holmes (1/1) 10' |

North Queensland Stadium, Townsville
Attendance: 19,172
Referee: Ashley Klein (Australia)
Video referee: Chris Butler (Australia)
Touch judges: Michael Wise (Australia), Nick Pelgrave (Australia)
Player of the Match: Reece Walsh (Australia)

=== Pools B and C ===
| Pos | Pool | Team | Pld | W | D | L | PF | PA | PD | Pts | Qualification |
|---|---|---|---|---|---|---|---|---|---|---|---|
| 1 | C | Tonga | 3 | 3 | 0 | 0 | 86 | 30 | +56 | 6 | Advance to knockout stage |
| 2 | B | Samoa | 3 | 2 | 0 | 1 | 160 | 30 | +130 | 4 | Advance to knockout stage |
| 3 | B | England | 3 | 2 | 0 | 1 | 128 | 42 | +86 | 4 | |
| 4 | C | Papua New Guinea (H) | 3 | 1 | 0 | 2 | 60 | 116 | −56 | 2 | |
| 5 | B | Lebanon | 3 | 1 | 0 | 2 | 42 | 98 | −56 | 2 | |
| 6 | C | France | 3 | 0 | 0 | 3 | 24 | 184 | −160 | 0 | |

Source: Source
Rules for classification: Pool stage tiebreakers
(H) Hosts

16 October 2026
17:45 AEDT (UTC+11:00)

| Samoa | 78–4 | France |
|---|---|---|
| Tries: 14; Mariner 2'; Ioelu 5', 80'; McEwen 7'; Fa'alogo 13', 36', 63', 67'; Tabuai-Fidow 17'; Crichton 42'; Blore 55'; Harris-Tavita 70'; Tago 74'; Molo 77'; Goals: 11; Crichton (11/15) 4', 6', 8', 19', 38', 44', 57', 71', 76', 78', 80' | 1st: 34–4; 2nd: 44–0; Report (NRL); Report (IRL) | Tries: 1 Aispuro-Bichet 24'; Goals: 0 Mourgue (0/1) |

Western Sydney Stadium, Sydney
Attendance: 13,174
Referee: Ashley Klein (Australia)
Video referee: Chris Butler (Australia)
Touch judges: Kieron Irons (Australia), Daniel Luttringer (Australia)
Player of the Match: Francis Manuleleua (Samoa)

17 October 2026
14:25 PNGST (UTC+11:00)

| Papua New Guinea | 42–18 | Lebanon |
|---|---|---|
| Tries: 7 Voro 7'; Derby 19'; Putt 30'; Glare 42'; Kapinias 47'; Martin 71'; Biondi-Odo 74'; Goals: 7 Martin (7/7) 8', 21', 31', 43', 49', 72', 74' | 1st: 18–12; 2nd: 24–6; Report (NRL); Report (IRL) | Tries: 3 Miski 35', 53'; Sukkar 39'; Goals: 3 Conti (3/3) 37', 40', 55' |

PNG Football Stadium, Port Moresby
Attendance: 11,624
Referee: Grant Atkins (Australia)
Video referee: Liam Kennedy (Australia)
Touch judges: Jarrod Cole (Australia), Jarrod Cole (Australia)
Player of the Match: Gairo Voro (Papua New Guinea)

17 October 2026
17:05 AWST (UTC+08:00)

| England | 12–30 | Tonga |
|---|---|---|
| Tries: 2 Brimson 45'; Young 62'; Goals: 2 Savala (2/2) 47', 63' | 1st: 0–10; 2nd: 12–20; Report (NRL); Report (IRL) | Tries: 4 Utoikamanu 23'; Olakau'atu 52', 70'; Koula 55'; Goals: 8 Katoa (7/8) 24', pen 27', pen 39', 53', 57', pen 60', pen 75' |

Perth Rectangular Stadium, Perth
Attendance: 18,302
Referee: Gerard Sutton (Australia)
Video referee: Ashley Klein (Australia)
Touch judges: Ziggy Przeklasa-Adamski (Australia), Adam Munroe (Australia)
Player of the Match: Isaiya Katoa (Tonga)

23 October 2026
20:05 AEDT (UTC+11:00)

| Tonga | 36–0 | Lebanon |
|---|---|---|
| Tries: 7 Katoa 12', 79'; Alamoti 20'; Koula 36'; Fifita 43', 73'; Halasima 69'; Goals: 4 Alamoti (1/4) 21'; Lolohea (3/3) 70', 74', 79' | 1st: 14–0; 2nd: 22–0; Report (NRL); Report (IRL) |

Western Sydney Stadium, Sydney
Attendance: 25,065
Referee: Liam Moore (England)
Video referee: Grant Atkins (Australia)
Touch judges: Ziggy Przeklasa-Adamski (Australia), Jarrod Cole (Australia)
Player of the Match: Tolutau Koula (Tonga)

24 October 2026
14:25 PNGST (UTC+11:00)

| Papua New Guinea | 6–64 | Samoa |
|---|---|---|
| Tries: 1 Biondi-Odo 18'; Goals: 1 Martin (1/1) 18'; Sin bin: Derby (yellow card) 63' to 73' | 1st: 6–14; 2nd: 0–50; Report (NRL); Report (IRL) | Tries: 13; Fa'alogo 1', 44'; Leniu 30'; Crichton 36'; Manuleleua 47'; Tabuai-Fidow 52', 68'; To'o 58'; Blore 65', 77'; Volkman 66'; Tago 70'; Mariota 79'; Goals: 6 Crichton (1/3) 30'; Harris-Tavita (2/6) 46', 67'; Volkman (3/4) 70', 72', 79' |

PNG Football Stadium, Port Moresby
Attendance: 15,008
Referee: Chris Kendall (England)
Video referee: Liam Kennedy (Australia)
Touch judges: Kieren Irons (Australia), Daniel Luttringer (Australia)
Player of the Match: Francis Manuleleua (Samoa)

24 October 2026
14:35 AWST (UTC+08:00)

| England | 82–0 | France |
|---|---|---|
| Tries: 14; Young 22', 45', 63'; Ashton 24'; Farnworth 26', 34', 39'; Williams 37'; Radley 48'; Litten 58'; Lewis 62', 68'; Welsby 66'; Brimson 77'; Goals: 13; Savala (13/14) 23', 25', 27', 36', 38', 39', 49', 59', 63', 65', 66', 69', 77' | 1st: 36–0; 2nd: 46–0; Report (NRL); Report (IRL) |

Perth Rectangular Stadium, Perth
Attendance: 10,723
Referee: Adam Gee (Australia)
Video referee: Chris Butler (Australia)
Touch judges: Jon Stone (Australia), Matt Noyen (Australia)
Player of the Match: AJ Brimson (England)

30 October 2026
20:05 AEDT (UTC+11:00)

| England | 34–12 | Papua New Guinea |
|---|---|---|
| Tries: 6 Ashton 5'; Brimson 11'; Young 18'; Smith 20'; Knowles 68'; Lewis 79'; Goals: 5 Savala (4/5) 6', 12', 21', pen 39'; Smith (1/2) 68' | 1st: 24–0; 2nd: 10–12; Report (NRL); Report (IRL) | Tries: 2 Dotoi 44'; Voro 50'; Goals: 2 Martin (2/2) 46', 51' |

Wollongong Showground, Wollongong
Attendance: 15,063
Referee: Gerard Sutton (Australia)
Video referee: Todd Smith (Australia)
Touch judges: Dave Munro (Australia), Drew Oultram (Australia)
Player of the Match: Kai Pearce-Paul (England)

1 November 2026
17:50 AEDT (UTC+11:00)

| Lebanon | 24–20 (g.p.) | France |
|---|---|---|
| Tries: 4 Conti 3'; Gabrael 45'; Francis 60'; Miski 84'; Goals: 4 Conti (4/6) 5', pen 24', 47', pen 75'; Sin bin: Twal (yellow card) 76' to 84' | 1st: 8–6; 2nd: 12–14; Golden point: 4–0; Report (NRL); Report (IRL) | Tries: 3 Bourouh 31'; Aispuro-Bichet 52'; Rouge 70'; Goals: 3 Mourgue (3/3) 32', 54', 71'; Field goals: 1 Mourgue 2pt 79'; Sin bin: Bousquet (yellow card) 76' to 84' |

Western Sydney Stadium, Sydney (Note: Match was a double-header with the Tonga v Samoa fixture.)
Attendance: 29,411
Referee: Liam Moore (England)
Video referee: Todd Smith (Australia)
Touch judges: Matt Noyen (Australia), Jon Stone (Australia)
Player of the Match: Alex Conti (Lebanon)

1 November 2026
20:05 AEDT (UTC+11:00)

| Tonga | 20–18 | Samoa |
|---|---|---|
| Tries: 3 Toia 26'; Fifita 45'; Fonua-Blake 72'; Goals: 4 Katoa (4/4) 27', pen 35', 47', 74' | 1st: 8–4; 2nd: 12–14; Report (NRL); Report (IRL) | Tries: 4 To'o 37', 50'; Tabuai-Fidow 62'; Volkman 67'; Goals: 1 Harris-Tavita (0/2); Volkman (1/2) 69' |

Western Sydney Stadium, Sydney (Note: Match was a double-header with the Lebanon v France fixture.)
Attendance: 29,411
Referee: Adam Gee (Australia)
Video referee: Chris Butler (Australia)
Touch judges: Ziggy Przeklasa-Adamski (Australia), Daniel Luttringer (Australia)
Player of the Match: Robert Toia (Tonga)

== Knockout stage ==
Following the conclusion of Round 2, the National Rugby League announced that the Australian men's and women's teams, having qualified for their respective semi-finals, would both play in Sydney on 8 November 2026.

=== Bracket ===
Semi-finals
7 November – Newcastle
New Zealand | 34
Tonga | 10
8 November – Sydney
Australia | 44
Samoa | 12

Final
15 November – Brisbane
Australia | 32
New Zealand | 12

=== Semi-finals ===
7 November 2026
20:05 AEDT (UTC+11:00)

| New Zealand | 34–10 | Tonga |
|---|---|---|
| Tries: 6 Nikora 3'; Gagai 36'; McLean 47'; Hughes 52'; Willison 69'; Nicoll-Klokstad 79'; Goals: 5 Isaako (5/6) 4', 37', 49', 54', 79' | 1st: 12–10; 2nd: 22–0; Report (NRL); Report (IRL) | Tries: 2 Fifita 20', 32'; Goals: 1 Katoa (1/2) 22' |

Newcastle International Sports Centre, Newcastle
Attendance: 29,712
Referee: Grant Atkins (Australia)
Video referee: Wyatt Raymond (Australia)
Touch judges: Daniel Luttringer (Australia), Matt Noyen (Australia)
Player of the Match: Kalyn Ponga (New Zealand)

8 November 2026
20:05 AEDT (UTC+11:00)

| Australia | 44–12 | Samoa |
|---|---|---|
| Tries: 8 Dearden 7'; Preston 13'; Trbojevic 24'; Walsh 31', 46', 65'; Best 36'; Bostock 71'; Goals: 6 Munster (6/8) 8', 15', 38', 48', 67', 73' | 1st: 26–2; 2nd: 18–10; Report (NRL); Report (IRL) | Tries: 2 Crichton 43'; Tago 60'; Goals: 2 Crichton (2/3) pen 4', 44'; Sin bin: Leniu (yellow card) 38' to 48' |

Sydney Football Stadium, Sydney
Attendance: 41,529
Referee: Adam Gee (Australia)
Video referee: Chris Butler (Australia)
Touch judges: Ziggy Przeklasa-Adamski (Australia), Tyson Brough (Australia)
Player of the Match: Reece Walsh (Australia)

=== Final ===
Australia celebrating after winning the final

15 November 2026
18:35 AEST (UTC+10:00)

| Australia | 32–12 | New Zealand |
|---|---|---|
| Tries: 6 Martin 1', 37'; Bostock 18', 76'; Best 31'; Trbojevic 42'; Goals: 4 Munster (4/7) 3', pen 23', 32', 39' | 1st: 24–6; 2nd: 8–6; Report (NRL); Report (IRL) | Tries: 2 McLean 11'; Papali'i 65'; Goals: 2 Isaako (2/2) 13', 66' |

Lang Park, Brisbane
Attendance: 52,461
Referee: Grant Atkins (Australia)
Video referee: Wyatt Raymond (Australia)
Touch judges: Matt Noyen (Australia), Tyson Brough (Australia)
Player of the Match: Jack Bostock (Australia)

== Attendance ==
The total and average attendance for the tournament is impacted by the two men's matches played consecutively at Western Sydney Stadium (CommBank Stadium) on Sunday, 1 November 2026. The official attendance for both Lebanon versus France and Tonga versus Samoa was given as 29,411. Counting that attendance twice, total attendance was 452,149 from 18 matches for an average of 25,119. Alternatively, counting the 29,411 once yields a total attendance of 422,738 from 17 match day events, for an average of 24,867.

== Team of the Tournament ==
Four days after the final, the team of the tournament was announced.

| Player | Age | Position | Team | Club |
|---|---|---|---|---|
| Kalyn Ponga | 28 | Fullback | New Zealand | Newcastle Knights |
| Jack Bostock | 23 | Wing | Australia | Dolphins |
| Robert Toia | 22 | Centre | Tonga | Sydney Roosters |
| Casey McLean | 20 | Centre | New Zealand | Penrith Panthers |
| Jamayne Isaako | 30 | Wing | New Zealand | Dolphins |
| Cameron Munster | 32 | Stand-off, Five-eighth | Australia | Melbourne Storm |
| Isaiya Katoa | 22 | Scrum-half, Halfback | Tonga | Dolphins |
| Tino Fa'asuamaleaui | 26 | Prop | Australia | Gold Coast Titans |
| Harry Grant | 28 | Hooker | Australia | Melbourne Storm |
| Jason Taumalolo | 33 | Prop | Tonga | North Qld Cowboys |
| Liam Martin | 29 | Second-row | Australia | Penrith Panthers |
| Jacob Preston | 25 | Second-row | Australia | Canterbury Bulldogs |
| Francis Manuleleua | 22 | Loose forward, Lock | Samoa | Newcastle Knights |
| Reece Walsh | 24 | interchange, Fullback | Australia | Brisbane Broncos |
| Isaah Yeo | 32 | interchange, Loose forward | Australia | Penrith Panthers |
| Haumole Olakau'atu | 28 | interchange, Second-row | Tonga | Manly Sea Eagles |
| James Fisher-Harris | 30 | interchange, Prop | New Zealand | New Zealand Warriors |
| Gairo Voro | 23 | interchange, Stand-off | Papua New Guinea | London Broncos |
| Kurt Donoghoe | 24 | interchange, Stand-off | Fiji | Dolphins |

Notes:

- Age is at the conclusion of the tournament (15 November 2026).
- Gairo Voro had not played in the 2026 NRL season. He did play for the London Broncos in the 2026 RFL Championship.

== Statistics ==
=== Final standings ===
| Pos | Grp | Team | Pld | W | D | L | PF | PA | PD | Pts | Final result |
|---|---|---|---|---|---|---|---|---|---|---|---|
| 1 | A | Australia (H) | 5 | 5 | 0 | 0 | 202 | 74 | +128 | 10 | Champions |
| 2 | A | New Zealand (H) | 5 | 3 | 0 | 2 | 228 | 82 | +146 | 6 | Runners-up |
| 3 | C | Tonga | 4 | 3 | 0 | 1 | 96 | 64 | +32 | 6 | Eliminated in semi-finals |
| 4 | B | Samoa | 4 | 2 | 0 | 2 | 172 | 74 | +98 | 4 | Eliminated in semi-finals |
| 5 | B | England | 3 | 2 | 0 | 1 | 128 | 42 | +86 | 4 | Eliminated in pool stage |
| 6 | C | Papua New Guinea (H) | 3 | 1 | 0 | 2 | 60 | 116 | −56 | 2 | Eliminated in pool stage |
| 7 | B | Lebanon | 3 | 1 | 0 | 2 | 42 | 98 | −56 | 2 | Eliminated in pool stage |
| 8 | A | Fiji | 3 | 1 | 0 | 2 | 62 | 126 | −64 | 2 | Eliminated in pool stage |
| 9 | A | Cook Islands | 3 | 0 | 0 | 3 | 34 | 188 | −154 | 0 | Eliminated in pool stage |
| 10 | C | France | 3 | 0 | 0 | 3 | 24 | 184 | −160 | 0 | Eliminated in pool stage |

Updated to match(es) played on 16 November 2026. Source: World Cup 2026
(H) Hosts

=== Most tries ===
Qualification: 2 tries

| Rank | Player | Team | Mat | Tries |
|---|---|---|---|---|
| 1 | Casey McLean | New Zealand | 5 | 9 |
| 1 | Tom Trbojevic | Australia | 5 | 9 |
| 1 | Jack Bostock | Australia | 5 | 9 |
| 4 | Sualauvi Fa'alogo | Samoa | 4 | 6 |
| 5 | Dom Young | England | 3 | 5 |
| 5 | Sosefo Fifita | Tonga | 4 | 5 |
| 5 | Reece Walsh | Australia | 4 | 5 |
| 8 | Hamiso Tabuai-Fidow | Samoa | 4 | 4 |
| 9 | Shawn Blore | Samoa | 2 | 3 |
| 9 | Herbie Farnworth | England | 3 | 3 |
| 9 | Esom Ioka | Cook Islands | 2 | 3 |
| 9 | Jamayne Isaako | New Zealand | 5 | 3 |
| 9 | Semi Valemei | Fiji | 3 | 3 |
| 9 | AJ Brimson | England | 3 | 3 |
| 9 | Ronaldo Mulitalo | New Zealand | 4 | 3 |
| 9 | Keano Kini | New Zealand | 3 | 3 |
| 9 | Mikey Lewis | England | 2 | 3 |
| 9 | Abbas Miski | Lebanon | 3 | 3 |
| 9 | Brian To'o | Samoa | 4 | 3 |
| 9 | Jacob Preston | Australia | 5 | 3 |
| 9 | Stephen Crichton | Samoa | 4 | 3 |
| 9 | Izack Tago | Samoa | 4 | 3 |
| 23 | Kalyn Ponga | New Zealand | 3 | 2 |
| 23 | Toluta'u Koula | Tonga | 4 | 2 |
| 23 | Haumole Olakau'atu | Tonga | 4 | 2 |
| 23 | Bailey Biondi-Odo | Papua New Guinea | 3 | 2 |
| 23 | Taane Milne | Fiji | 3 | 2 |
| 23 | Solomone Saukuru | Fiji | 3 | 2 |
| 23 | Ben Ioelu | Samoa | 4 | 2 |
| 23 | Gairo Voro | Papua New Guinea | 3 | 2 |
| 23 | Matty Ashton | England | 2 | 2 |
| 23 | Tanner Stowers-Smith | New Zealand | 1 | 2 |
| 23 | Kotoni Staggs | Australia | 5 | 2 |
| 23 | Tino Fa'asuamaleaui | Australia | 5 | 2 |
| 23 | Guillermo Aispuro-Bichet | France | 3 | 2 |
| 23 | Sione Katoa | Tonga | 1 | 2 |
| 23 | Ronald Volkman | Samoa | 3 | 2 |
| 23 | Briton Nikora | New Zealand | 4 | 2 |
| 23 | Dane Gagai | New Zealand | 4 | 2 |
| 23 | Jahrome Hughes | New Zealand | 5 | 2 |
| 23 | Xavier Willison | New Zealand | 5 | 2 |
| 23 | Charnze Nicoll-Klokstad | New Zealand | 2 | 2 |
| 23 | Bradman Best | Australia | 4 | 2 |
| 23 | Liam Martin | Australia | 4 | 2 |

=== Most points ===
Qualification: 10 points

| Rank | Player | Team | Mat | Tries | Goals | DG | Points |
|---|---|---|---|---|---|---|---|
| 1 | Jamayne Isaako | New Zealand | 5 | 3 | 38 | 0 | 88 |
| 2 | Stephen Crichton | Samoa | 4 | 3 | 14 | 0 | 40 |
| 3 | Hugo Savala | England | 3 | 0 | 19 | 0 | 38 |
| 4 | Casey McLean | New Zealand | 5 | 9 | 0 | 0 | 36 |
| 4 | Tom Trbojevic | Australia | 5 | 9 | 0 | 0 | 36 |
| 4 | Jack Bostock | Australia | 5 | 9 | 0 | 0 | 36 |
| 7 | Reece Walsh | Australia | 4 | 5 | 5 | 0 | 30 |
| 7 | Cameron Munster | Australia | 4 | 0 | 15 | 0 | 30 |
| 9 | Sualauvi Fa'alogo | Samoa | 4 | 6 | 0 | 0 | 24 |
| 9 | Rhyse Martin | Papua New Guinea | 3 | 1 | 10 | 0 | 24 |
| 9 | Isaiya Katoa | Tonga | 3 | 0 | 12 | 0 | 24 |
| 12 | Dom Young | England | 3 | 5 | 0 | 0 | 20 |
| 12 | Sosefo Fifita | Tonga | 4 | 5 | 0 | 0 | 20 |
| 14 | Alex Conti | Lebanon | 3 | 1 | 7 | 0 | 18 |
| 14 | Brandon Wakeham | Fiji | 3 | 0 | 9 | 0 | 18 |
| 16 | Hamiso Tabuai-Fidow | Samoa | 4 | 4 | 0 | 0 | 16 |
| 16 | Sam Walker | Australia | 1 | 1 | 6 | 0 | 16 |
| 16 | Ronald Volkman | Samoa | 3 | 2 | 4 | 0 | 16 |
| 19 | Shawn Blore | Samoa | 2 | 3 | 0 | 0 | 12 |
| 19 | Herbie Farnworth | England | 3 | 3 | 0 | 0 | 12 |
| 19 | Esom Ioka | Cook Islands | 2 | 3 | 0 | 0 | 12 |
| 19 | Semi Valemei | Fiji | 3 | 3 | 0 | 0 | 12 |
| 19 | AJ Brimson | England | 3 | 3 | 0 | 0 | 12 |
| 19 | Mikey Lewis | England | 2 | 3 | 0 | 0 | 12 |
| 19 | Ronaldo Mulitalo | New Zealand | 4 | 3 | 0 | 0 | 12 |
| 19 | Keano Kini | New Zealand | 3 | 3 | 0 | 0 | 12 |
| 19 | Abbas Miski | Lebanon | 3 | 3 | 0 | 0 | 12 |
| 19 | Brian To'o | Samoa | 4 | 3 | 0 | 0 | 12 |
| 19 | Izack Tago | Samoa | 4 | 3 | 0 | 0 | 12 |
| 19 | Jacob Preston | Australia | 5 | 3 | 0 | 0 | 12 |

== Controversy ==
=== Team reduction and qualification eligibility ===
The reduction of teams for the 2026 World Cup from 16 to 10 gained criticism from players and associations of lower ranked nations for whom it would now be much harder to qualify for the competition and claims that this would harm growth of rugby league in these countries. On 22 August 2023, it was reported that a letter signed by 16 member associations was sent to International Rugby League protesting against the reduction of teams and ban on affiliate members.

International Rugby League (IRL) claimed the reduction was to increase the competitiveness of games thus showcasing the sport better. The IRL claimed having lower ranked nations at the 2021 tournament came at a "significant cost" and did not bring "commercial benefits".

A ban on affiliate members was not put in place for the women's and wheelchair world cups.

Ahead of the qualification process, Wales then-head coach John Kear criticised the reduction, stating it sent the wrong message about IRL's commitment to grow the international game and skews qualification in favour of Oceanian teams.

=== England travel schedule ===
England's travel plan to Perth for their opening match took them on a bus from Manchester to London before a set of three flights to Singapore, to Sydney, and then to Perth. A journey which took an excess of 48 hours to complete. Team travel to Australia was booked by the tournament organiser and was done so for the cheapest possible route which had a greater impact on teams travelling a longer distance.

=== Group imbalance ===
With the reduction to 10 teams and the combination of Groups B and C into one table, different levels of jeopardy existed in the tournament, with teams in Group A having an additional safety net en route to the knockouts.

== See also ==
- 2026 Men's Rugby League World Cup squads
- 2026 Men's Rugby League World Cup statistics
- 2026 Women's Rugby League World Cup
- 2026 Wheelchair Rugby League World Cup
