= Cook Islands at the Rugby League World Cup =

Cook Islands have competed in four editions of the Rugby League World Cup. They were eliminated at the group stage on all occasions.

== Tournament results ==
Rugby League World Cup record
Year	Result	Position	Pld	W	D	L	PF	PA
(France) 1954	Did not participate							
(Australia) 1957	Did not participate							
(United Kingdom) 1960	Did not participate							
(Australia) (New Zealand) 1968	Did not participate							
(United Kingdom) 1970	Did not participate							
(France) 1972	Did not participate							
1975	Did not participate							
(Australia) (New Zealand) 1977	Did not participate							
1985–88	Did not participate							
1989–92	Did not participate							
(United Kingdom) 1995	Did not qualify							
(France) (United Kingdom) 2000	Group stage	13th	3	0	1	2	38	144
(Australia) 2008	Did not qualify							
(England) (Wales) 2013	Group stage	9th	3	1	0	2	64	78
(Australia) (New Zealand) (Papua New Guinea) 2017	Did not qualify							
(England) 2021	Group stage	11th	3	1	0	2	44	136
(Australia) (New Zealand) (Papua New Guinea) 2026	Group stage	9th	3	0	0	3	34	188
Total	–	–	12	3	1	9	180	546

== Tournaments ==
Key
Colour	Meaning
	Qualifiers to the next round

=== 2000 ===
Team	Played	Won	Drawn	Lost	For	Against	Diff	Points
New Zealand	3	3	0	0	206	28	+178	6
Wales	3	2	0	1	80	86	−6	4
Lebanon	3	0	1	2	44	110	−66	1
Cook Islands	3	0	1	2	38	144	−106	1

Round	Score	Opposition	Venue
Group Stage	6–38	Wales	Racecourse Ground, Wrexham
Group Stage	10–84	New Zealand	Madejski Stadium, Reading
Group Stage	22–22	Lebanon	Millennium Stadium, Cardiff

=== 2013 ===
Team	Pld	W	D	L	TF	PF	PA	+/−	Pts
United States	3	2	0	1	13	64	58	+6	4
Cook Islands	3	1	0	2	12	64	78	–14	2
Wales	3	0	0	3	11	56	84	–28	0

Round	Score	Opposition	Venue
Group Stage	20–32	United States	Memorial Stadium, Bristol
Group Stage	16–22	Tonga	Leigh Sports Village, Leigh
Group Stage	28–24	Wales	The Gnoll, Neath

=== 2021 ===
Pos	Team	Pld	W	D	L	PF	PA	PD	Pts	Qualification
1	Tonga	3	3	0	0	148	34	+114	6	Advance to knockout stage
2	Papua New Guinea	3	2	0	1	86	40	+46	4	Advance to knockout stage
3	Cook Islands	3	1	0	2	44	136	−92	2	
4	Wales	3	0	0	3	18	86	−68	0	

Source: rlwc2021

Round	Score	Opposition	Venue
Group Stage	18–12	Wales	Leigh Sports Village, Leigh
Group Stage	16–32	Papua New Guinea	Halliwell Jones Stadium, Warrington
Group Stage	10–92	Tonga	Riverside Stadium, Middlesbrough

=== 2026 ===
Pos	Team	Pld	W	D	L	PF	PA	PD	Pts	Qualification
1	Australia (H)	3	3	0	0	126	50	+76	6	Advance to knockout stage
2	New Zealand (H)	3	2	0	1	182	40	+142	4	Advance to knockout stage
3	Fiji	3	1	0	2	62	126	−64	2	
4	Cook Islands	3	0	0	3	34	188	−154	0	

Source: Source
Rules for classification: Pool stage tiebreakers
(H) Hosts

Round	Score	Opposition	Venue
Group Stage	12–40	Fiji	McDonald Jones Stadium, Newcastle
Group Stage	16–82	New Zealand	One NZ Stadium, Christchurch
Group Stage	6–66	Australia	Queensland Country Bank Stadium, Townsville
