= 2026 Men's Rugby League World Cup knockout stage =

The 2026 Rugby League World Cup knockout stage took place after the group stages of the 2026 Men's Rugby League World Cup, and ends with the Final, at Lang Park on the 15th November 2026.

== Qualified teams ==
The top two teams from Pool A and Pools B & C qualified for the knockout stage.

Pool	Winners	Runners-up
A	Australia	New Zealand
B & C	Tonga	Samoa

== Bracket ==
The tournament bracket is shown below, with bold denoting the winners of each match.

Semi-finals
7 November – Newcastle
**New Zealand**	**34**
Tonga	10
8 November – Sydney
**Australia**	**44**
Samoa	12

Final
15 November – Brisbane
**Australia**	**32**
New Zealand	12

== Semi-finals ==
=== New Zealand vs Tonga ===
7 November 2026
20:05 AEDT (UTC+11:00)

New Zealand	34–10	Tonga
Tries: **6** Nikora 3'; Gagai 36'; McLean 47'; Hughes 52'; Willison 69'; Nicoll-Klokstad 79'; Goals: **5** Isaako (5/6) 4', 37', 49', 54', 79'	1st: 12–10; 2nd: 22–0; Report (NRL); Report (IRL)	Tries: **2** Fifita 20', 32'; Goals: **1** Katoa (1/2) 22'

Newcastle International Sports Centre, Newcastle
Attendance: 29,712
Referee: Grant Atkins (Australia)
Video referee: Wyatt Raymond (Australia)
Touch judges: Daniel Luttringer (Australia), Matt Noyen (Australia)
Player of the Match: Kalyn Ponga (New Zealand)

**Tonga**	**New Zealand**

FB	21	Kalyn Ponga
WG	2	Jamayne Isaako
CE	3	Dane Gagai
CE	4	Casey McLean
WG	5	Charnze Nicoll-Klokstad
FE	6	Kodi Nikorima
HB	7	Jahrome Hughes
PR	8	James Fisher Harris (c)
HK	9	Jeremy Marshall-King
PR	10	Moses Leota
SR	11	Isaiah Papali'i
SR	12	Briton Nikora
LK	13	Joseph Tapine
Substitutes:
IC	15	Naufahu Whyte
IC	16	Erin Clark
IC	17	Xavier Willison
IC	22	Phoenix Crossland
RS	1	Keano Kini
RS	14	Te Maire Martin
Coach:
(New Zealand) Stacey Jones

FB	1	Lehi Hopoate
WG	2	Dallin Watene-Zelezniak
CE	3	Tolutau Koula
CE	20	Paul Alamoti
WG	5	Jojo Fifita
FE	6	Tuimoala Lolohea
HB	7	Isaiya Katoa
PR	8	Addin Fonua-Blake
HK	9	Salesi Foketi
PR	10	Jason Taumalolo (c)
SR	11	Haumole Olakau'atu
SR	12	Siua Wong
LK	13	Tyson Frizell
Substitutes:
IC	15	Stefano Utoikamanu
IC	16	Demitric Vaimauga
IC	17	Taniela Paseka
IC	18	Leka Halasima
RS	14	Soni Luke
RS	19	Latu Fainu
Coach:
(Australia) Kristian Woolf

=== Australia vs Samoa ===
8 November 2026
20:05 AEDT (UTC+11:00)

Australia	44–12	Samoa
Tries: **8** Dearden 7'; Preston 13'; Trbojevic 24'; Walsh 31', 46', 65'; Best 36'; Bostock 71'; Goals: **6** Munster (6/8) 8', 15', 38', 48', 67', 73'	1st: 26–2; 2nd: 18–10; Report (NRL); Report (IRL)	Tries: **2** Crichton 43'; Tago 60'; Goals: **2** Crichton (2/3) pen 4', 44'; Sin bin: Leniu (yellow card) 38' to 48'

Sydney Football Stadium, Sydney
Attendance: 41,529
Referee: Adam Gee (Australia)
Video referee: Chris Butler (Australia)
Touch judges: Ziggy Przeklasa-Adamski (Australia), Tyson Brough (Australia)
Player of the Match: Reece Walsh (Australia)

**Australia**	**Samoa**

FB	1	Reece Walsh
WG	2	Jack Bostock
CE	3	Kotoni Staggs
CE	4	Bradman Best
WG	5	Tom Trbojevic
FE	6	Cameron Munster
HB	7	Tom Dearden
PR	10	Tino Fa'asuamaleaui
HK	9	Harry Grant
PR	15	Keaon Koloamatangi
SR	11	Jacob Preston
SR	12	Liam Martin
LK	13	Isaah Yeo (c)
Substitutes:
IC	8	Patrick Carrigan
IC	14	Ethan Strange
IC	16	Cameron Murray
IC	17	Reuben Cotter
RS	18	Latrell Mitchell
RS	19	Sam Walker
Coach:
(Australia) Kevin Walters

FB	1	Hamiso Tabuai-Fidow
WG	2	Brian To'o
CE	3	Izack Tago
CE	4	Stephen Crichton
WG	5	Sualauvi Fa'alogo
FE	6	Ronald Volkman
HB	7	Jarome Luai (c)
PR	8	Francis Molo
HK	14	Jazz Tevaga
PR	10	Junior Paulo
SR	11	Connelly Lemuelu
SR	12	Jermaine McEwen
LK	13	Francis Manuleleua
Substitutes:
IC	9	Benaiah Ioelu
IC	15	Spencer Leniu
IC	17	Ata Mariota
IC	18	Clayton Faulalo
RS	16	Shawn Blore
RS	19	Deine Mariner
Coach:
(Australia) Ben Gardiner

== Final ==
15 November 2026
18:35 AEST (UTC+10:00)

Australia	32–12	New Zealand
Tries: **6** Martin 1', 37'; Bostock 18', 76'; Best 31'; Trbojevic 42'; Goals: **4** Munster (4/7) 3', pen 23', 32', 39'	1st: 24–6; 2nd: 8–6; Report (NRL); Report (IRL)	Tries: **2** McLean 11'; Papali'i 65'; Goals: **2** Isaako (2/2) 13', 66'

Lang Park, Brisbane
Attendance: 52,461
Referee: Grant Atkins (Australia)
Video referee: Wyatt Raymond (Australia)
Touch judges: Matt Noyen (Australia), Tyson Brough (Australia)
Player of the Match: Jack Bostock (Australia)

Team lists:

FB	1	Reece Walsh
WG	2	Jack Bostock
CE	3	Kotoni Staggs
CE	4	Bradman Best
WG	5	Tom Trbojevic
FE	6	Cameron Munster
HB	7	Tom Dearden
PR	8	Patrick Carrigan
HK	9	Harry Grant
PR	10	Tino Fa'asuamaleaui
SR	11	Jacob Preston
SR	12	Liam Martin
LF	13	Isaah Yeo (c)
Interchange:
IN	14	Ethan Strange
IN	15	Keaon Koloamatangi
IN	16	Cameron Murray
IN	17	Reuben Cotter
IN	19	Sam Walker
IN	22	James Tedesco
Coach:
(Australia) Kevin Walters

FB	1	Kalyn Ponga
WG	2	Jamayne Isaako
CE	3	Dane Gagai
CE	4	Casey McLean
WG	5	Ronaldo Mulitalo
FE	6	Kodi Nikorima
HB	7	Jahrome Hughes
PR	8	James Fisher-Harris (c)
HK	9	Jeremy Marshall-King
PR	10	Moses Leota
SR	11	Isaiah Papali'i
SR	12	Briton Nikora
LF	13	Joseph Tapine
Interchange:
IN	14	Te Maire Martin
IN	15	Naufahu Whyte
IN	16	Erin Clark
IN	17	Xavier Willison
IN	18	Keano Kini
IN	19	Phoenix Crossland
Coach:
(New Zealand) Stacey Jones
