= Toluta'u Koula =

Toluta'u Koula may refer to:

- Toluta'u Koula (sprinter)
- Toluta'u Koula (rugby league)
