= Josese Lanyon =

Fiji international rugby league footballer (born 2004)

Personal information
- Full name: Josese Lanyon
- Born: 25 October 2004 (age 22) Savusavu, Fiji

Playing information
- Position: Hooker
Club
Years	Team	Pld	T	G	FG	P
2026–	Wests Tigers	4	0	0	0	0
Representative
Years	Team	Pld	T	G	FG	P
2026–	Fiji	3	0	0	0	0
- Source: As of 31 October 2026

Josese Lanyon (born 25 October 2004) is a Fijian professional rugby league footballer who plays as a hooker for the Wests Tigers in the NRL and Fiji at international level.

== Early years ==
A hooker, Lanyon played junior rugby league for the Chester Hill Hornets before representing the Merrylands Rams in A-Grade Open Men’s rugby league. In 2024, he competed in the Central West Open Men’s Silver competition, finishing as the competition’s leading point-scorer and helping Merrylands reach the grand final, where they lost 42–26 to Guildford at Ringrose Park on 7 September 2024.[4] Lanyon played in the Canterbury-Bankstown Bulldogs’ junior system from 2019 to 2023 before joining the Wests Tigers pathways system.[2] In 2025, he was named the Wests Tigers’ Jersey Flegg Player of the Year.[3]

== Career ==
=== 2026 ===
Lanyon debuted in first-grade debut for the Wests Tigers in the 2026 NRL season. He twice deputised for Api Koroisau as hooker and made a further two appearances off the bench.

In the 2026 post season, Lanyon was named in the Fiji squad to contest the 2026 Men's Rugby League World Cup, making his international début in the 40-12 win over Cook Islands on 18 October 2026.
