= Bayleigh Bentley-Hape =

Fiji international rugby league footballer

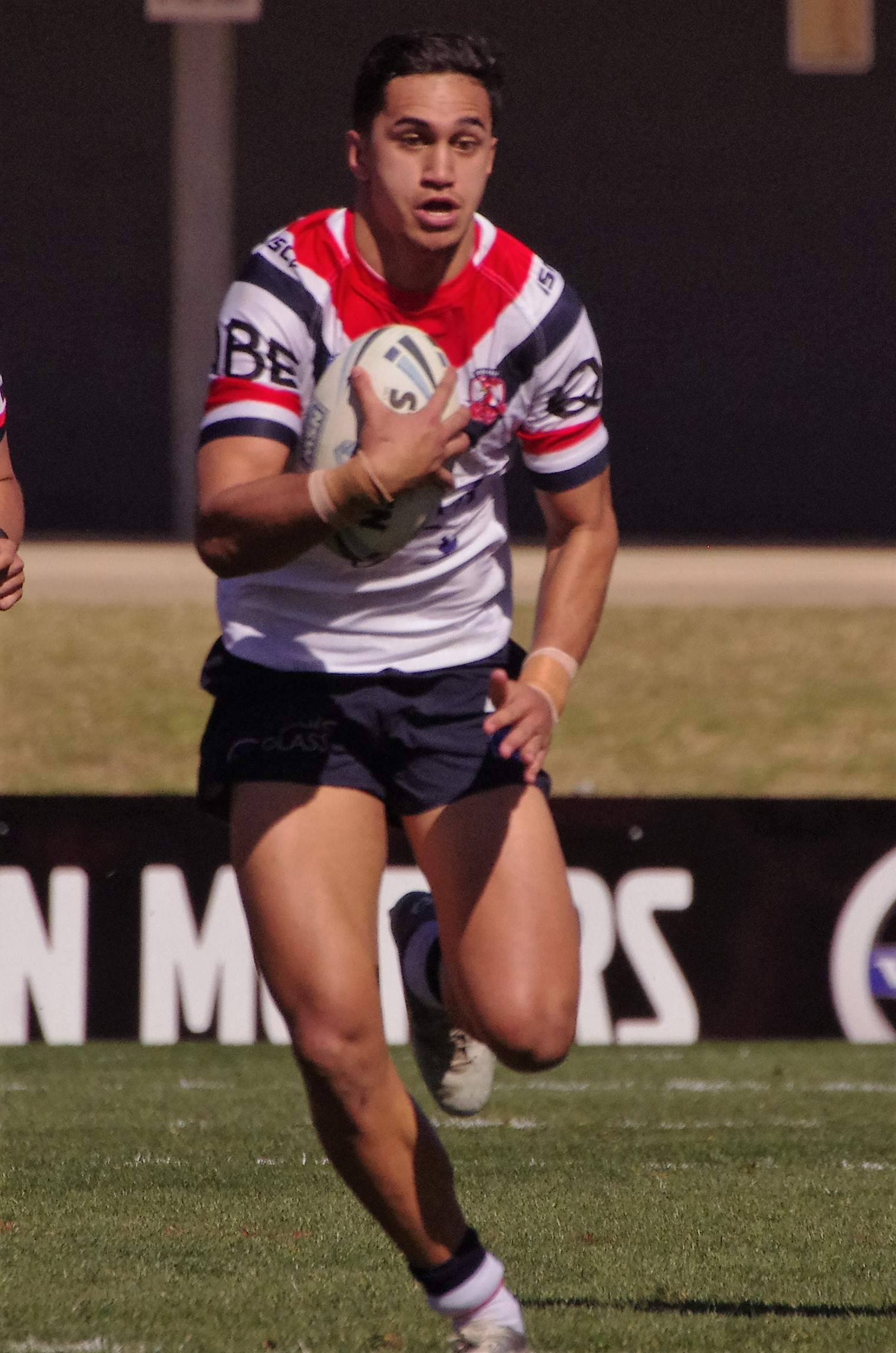

Personal information
- Full name: Bayleigh Bentley-Hape
- Born: 8 March 2000 (age 26) Kawakawa, New Zealand
- Height: 188 cm (6 ft 2 in)
- Weight: 90 kg (14 st 2 lb)

Playing information
- Position: Wing, Centre
Club
Years	Team	Pld	T	G	FG	P
2025–	South Sydney	10	4	5	0	26
Representative
Years	Team	Pld	T	G	FG	P
2026–	Fiji	2	0	0	0	0
- Source: As of 19 November 2026

Bayleigh Bentley-Hape (born 8 March 2000) is a Fiji international rugby league footballer who plays as a winger or centre for the South Sydney Rabbitohs in the National Rugby League.

== Early life ==
Bentley‑Hape was born in Kawakawa, New Zealand and played junior rugby league for the Moerewa Tigers. He was signed by the Sydney Roosters as a youth and progressed through their Harold Matthews, SG Ball, and Jersey Flegg systems between 2016 and 2021. After returning to New Zealand due to COVID-19 disruptions, he joined the Rabbitohs, debuting in the NSW Cup in mid-2023.

== Playing career ==
=== NSW Cup ===
Bentley‑Hape featured in 2 NSW Cup matches in 2023, then became a regular in 2024 with 20 appearances, scoring 5 tries. In early 2025, he played 2 NSW Cup matches, scoring twice and successfully kicking goals.

=== NRL debut and 2025 season ===
Bentley‑Hape made his first grade debut in round 2 of the 2025 NRL season on 15 March, playing on the wing in South Sydney's 25–24 victory over St. George Illawarra. He ran for 91 metres on 13 carries. He has made six appearances for South Sydney in 2025, scoring one try.

=== Representative ===
He made his Fiji international début in the 2026 Rugby League World Cup 40–12 win over Cook Islands on 18 October 2026.
