= Elijah Keung =

Fiji international rugby league footballer

Personal information
- Full name: Elijah Keung
- Born: 29 January 2006 (age 20) Sydney, New South Wales, Australia
- Height: 191 cm (6 ft 3 in)
- Weight: 110 kg (17 st 5 lb)

Playing information
- Position: Prop
Club
Years	Team	Pld	T	G	FG	P
	South Sydney Rabbitohs	0	0	0	0	0
Representative
Years	Team	Pld	T	G	FG	P
2026–	Fiji	2	0	0	0	0
- As of 9 November 2026

Elijah Keung (born 29 January 2006) is a Fiji international rugby league footballer who plays as a prop and is contracted to the South Sydney Rabbitohs in the National Rugby League.

== Career ==
He made his debut for Fiji in their 40–12 win over the Cook Islands in the 2026 Rugby League World Cup.
