= Emosi Ravosai =

Fiji international rugby league footballer

Personal information
- Full name: Emosi Ravosai
- Born: 2005 or 2006
- Height: 192 cm (6 ft 4 in)
- Weight: 106 kg (16 st 10 lb)

Playing information
- Position: Prop
Club
Years	Team	Pld	T	G	FG	P
	New Zealand Warriors	0	0	0	0	0
Representative
Years	Team	Pld	T	G	FG	P
2026–	Fiji	2	0	0	0	0
- As of 1 November 2026

Emosi Ravosai (born 2005 or 2006) is a Fiji international rugby league footballer who plays as a prop and is contracted to the New Zealand Warriors in the National Rugby League.

== Background ==
He played rugby union for Southern Cross Campus in his youth before joining the Warriors system.

== Career ==
He made his debut for Fiji in their 40-12 win over the Cook Islands in the 2026 Rugby League World Cup.
