= Maui Winitana-Patelesio =

Cook Islands international rugby league footballer

Personal information
- Full name: Maui Winitana-Patelesio
- Born: 2006 (age 19–20) Wellington, New Zealand
- Height: 180 cm (5 ft 11 in)
- Weight: 87 kg (13 st 10 lb)

Playing information
- Position: Five-eighth
Club
Years	Team	Pld	T	G	FG	P
	New Zealand Warriors	0	0	0	0	0
Representative
Years	Team	Pld	T	G	FG	P
2026–	Cook Islands	3	1	2	0	8
- As of 9 November 2026

Maui Winitana-Patelesio is a Cook Islands international rugby league footballer who plays as a five-eighth and is contracted to the New Zealand Warriors in the National Rugby League.

== Career ==
He made his debut for the Cook Islands in their 40–12 loss to Fiji in the 2026 Rugby League World Cup, scoring a try and kicking 2 conversions.
