= Jordan Miller (rugby league) =

Fiji international rugby league footballer (born 2005)

Personal information
- Full name: Jordan Miller
- Born: 7 February 2005 (age 21) Liverpool, New South Wales, Australia
- Height: 192 cm (6 ft 4 in)
- Weight: 131 kg (20 st 9 lb)

Playing information
- Position: Prop
Club
Years	Team	Pld	T	G	FG	P
2024	Wests Tigers	2	0	0	0	0
2026–	Parramatta Eels	0	0	0	0	0
	Total	2	0	0	0	0
Representative
Years	Team	Pld	T	G	FG	P
2024–	Fiji	3	0	0	0	0
- Source: As of 31 October 2026

Jordan Miller (born 7 February 2005) is a Fiji international rugby league footballer who plays for the Parramatta Eels in the NRL.

== Background ==
Miller spent his high school years at Patrician Brothers' College, Fairfield. Miller was selected for the Australian Schoolboys and also helped Fairfield Pats claim the Peter Mulholland Schoolboys Cup. He played SG Ball for Western Suburbs in 2023.

== Playing career ==
=== 2024 ===
In Round 15 of the 2024 NRL season, Miller made his first grade debut for the Wests Tigers in their 18-10 win against the Gold Coast Titans.

In late 2024, Miller was sacked from the Wests Tigers after being given two breach notices for showing up to training late. Miller later said that he was talking with the police due to domestic violence matters that didn't pertain to him, he said that the club didn't believe him. While waiting to return to the field he had taken up boxing in the meantime. Miller had hired former Wests chairman Lee Hagipantelis to oversee arbitration.

=== 2025 ===
In August, Miller began playing for the Parramatta Eels in the Jersey Flegg Cup.
