= Francis Manuleleua =

Samoa international rugby league footballer

Personal information
- Born: 24 May 2004 (age 22) Auckland, New Zealand
- Height: 186 cm (6 ft 1 in)
- Weight: 110 kg (17 st 5 lb)

Playing information
- Position: Second-row
Club
Years	Team	Pld	T	G	FG	P
2026–	Newcastle Knights	15	4	0	0	16
Representative
Years	Team	Pld	T	G	FG	P
2026–	Samoa	4	1	0	0	4
- Source: As of 8 November 2026

Francis Manuleleua (born 24 May 2004) is a New Zealand professional rugby league footballer who plays as a second-row forward for the Newcastle Knights in the National Rugby League and Samoa.

== Background ==
Born and raised in Auckland, New Zealand, Manuleleua is of Samoan descent. His elder brother Sam Manuleleua played for the Parramatta Eels and the South Sydney Rabbitohs at under-20s level as well as the Junior Kiwis at representative level.

He played his junior rugby league for the Papatoetoe Panthers, before being signed by the Penrith Panthers.

He worked as a groundsman at Penrith before becoming professional.

== Playing career ==
=== Early years ===
Manuleleua came through the Penrith Panthers pathways squads, playing with their S. G. Ball Cup team in 2023 and Jersey Flegg Cup team in 2024. In September 2024, he signed a 3-year contract with the Newcastle Knights starting in 2025.

=== 2026 ===
In round 3 of the 2026 NRL season, Manuleleua made his NRL debut for Newcastle against the New Zealand Warriors. On 5 August 2026, the Newcastle outfit announced Manuleleua had re-signed with the club for a further two years. He played 15 matches for Newcastle in the 2026 NRL season including their 2026 NRL Grand Final loss to the Sydney Roosters. He made his Samoa international début in the 2026 Rugby League World Cup 78-4 win over France on 16 October 2026.
