= Solomone Saukuru =

Fiji international rugby league footballer

Personal information
- Full name: Solomone Saukuru
- Born: 4 November 2004 (age 21) Sydney, New South Wales, Australia
- Height: 185 cm (6 ft 1 in)
- Weight: 115 kg (18 st 2 lb)

Playing information
- Position: Centre, Wing
Club
Years	Team	Pld	T	G	FG	P
2026–	Wests Tigers	4	4	0	0	16
Representative
Years	Team	Pld	T	G	FG	P
2019	Pasifika under-16	1	0	0	0	0
2025–	Fiji	5	4	0	0	16
- As of 31 October 2026

Solomone 'Sol' Saukuru (born 4 November 2004) is a Fiji international rugby league footballer who plays as a centre for the Wests Tigers in the NRL.

== Club career ==
He played junior rugby at Hurstville United, before joining the West Tigers Pathway system in 2021 and impressed at every level, progressing through Harold Matthews, SG Ball and Jersey Flegg.

He played for the Western Suburbs Magpies in The Knock-On Effect NSW Cup, and was their top try scorer in 2026.

Saukuru made his NRL debut on the 16 August 2026, starting at centre against the St. George Illawarra Dragons, he scored a brace. However it was not enough as the Tigers fell short 22–24.

After 4 games and 4 tries in his first season, West Tigers re-signed Saukuru for 2 more years.

== International career ==
=== Pasifika ===
In June 2019, he was selected to play for Pasifika under-16 against New South Wales under-16. He came of the bench in the 36–6 loss.

=== Fiji ===
He was selected in the Fiji squad for the 2025 Pacific Bowl. His debut came off the bench against the Cook Islands, he scored in the 44–24. He again came off the bench against Papua New Guinea to score again. Fiji finishing 2nd in the tournament.

He was named in the Fiji squad for the 2026 Rugby League World Cup.
