= Kalyn Ponga =

New Zealand international rugby league footballer (born 1998)

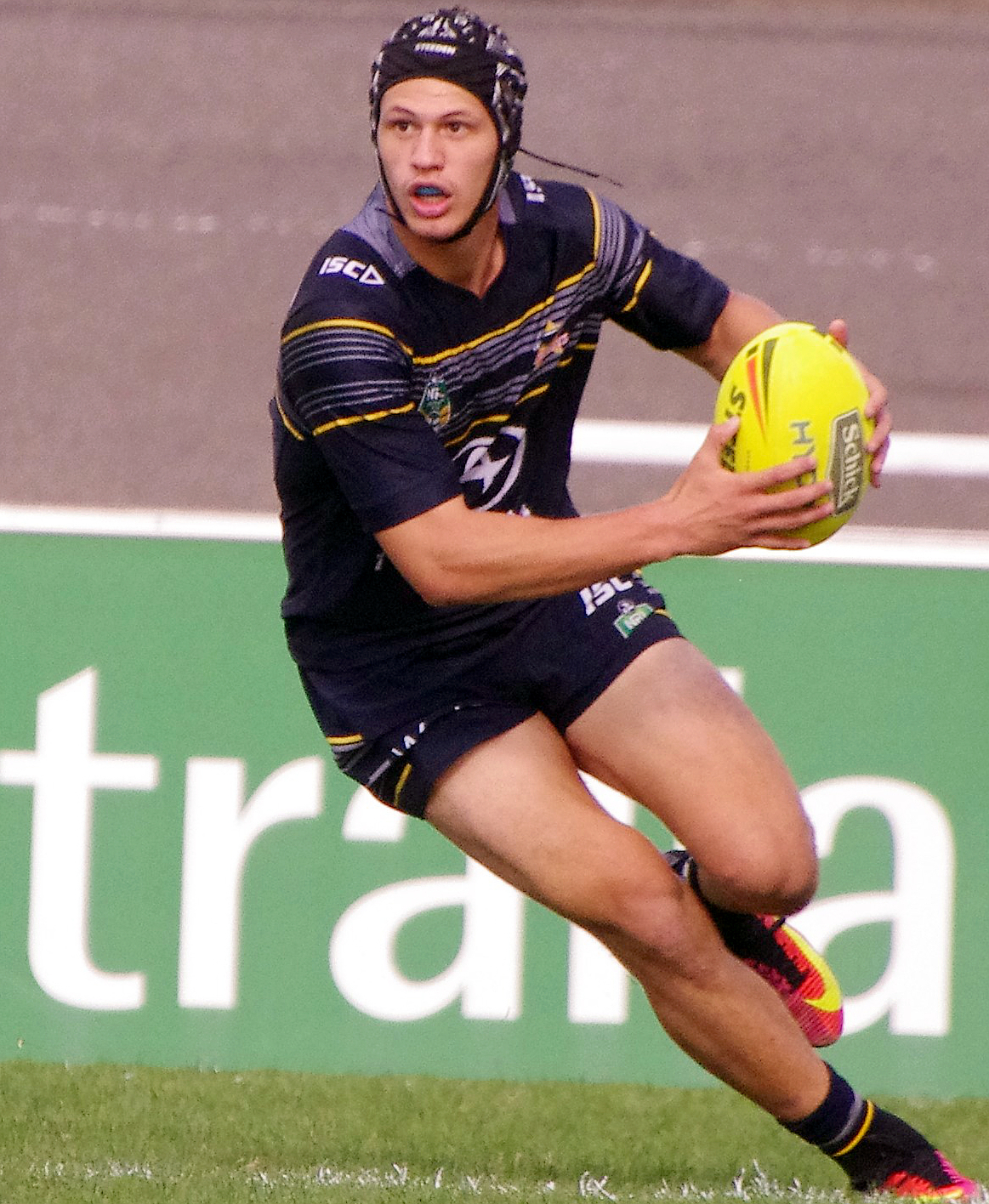

Personal information
- Born: Kalyn Jay Ponga; 30 March 1998 (age 28) Port Hedland, Western Australia
- Height: 184 cm (6 ft 0 in)
- Weight: 92 kg (14 st 7 lb)

Playing information
- Position: Fullback, Five-eighth
Club
Years	Team	Pld	T	G	FG	P
2016–17	North Qld Cowboys	9	3	0	0	12
2018–	Newcastle Knights	158	58	291	0	814
	Total	167	61	291	0	826
Representative
Years	Team	Pld	T	G	FG	P
2018–26	Queensland	13	1	4	0	12
2019–25	Māori All Stars	3	0	4	0	8
2019	Australia 9s	5	1	0	0	5
2026–	New Zealand	3	2	0	0	8
- Source: As of 22 November 2026

Kalyn Jay Ponga (born 30 March 1998) is a professional rugby league footballer who captains and plays as a fullback for the Newcastle Knights in the National Rugby League, Queensland in the State of Origin series and New Zealand at international level. He is the recipient of the 2023 Dally M Medal.

Ponga previously played for the North Queensland Cowboys in the NRL. At international level he has played for the New Zealand Kiwis and Australia 9s as well as the New Zealand Māori. At representative level Ponga has played for Queensland in the State of Origin series. He has also played as a five-eighth and debuted on the wing.

== Background ==
Kalyn Jay Ponga was born in Port Hedland, Western Australia, to parents from New Zealand, and is of Māori descent by way of his father's ancestry. He spent an early portion of his life in Newman, Western Australia, before moving to Mount Isa, Queensland, at the age of two. In 2006, at the age of eight, he relocated with his family to Palmerston North, New Zealand, and spent five years there, where he played a number of sports; including rugby league, touch football, hockey, rugby union, golf and soccer. In 2010, he won New Zealand's under-13 national golf championship.

In 2011, at the age of 13, Ponga and his family returned to Queensland, settling in Mackay. He attended Mackay State High School and was a member of the Rugby League Academy program, as well as playing junior rugby league for Souths Mackay. Also in 2011, he was signed to a scholarship with the Central Queensland NRL bid side. In 2012, he was selected for the Australian Schoolboys under-15 side, becoming just the second 14-year-old to make the side.

In 2013, Ponga, then a scholarship holder with the Brisbane Broncos, moved to Brisbane. He attended Anglican Church Grammar School and competed for their rugby union side in the prestigious GPS competition, while also playing rugby league for the Easts Tigers in the Cyril Connell Cup. That year he made the Australian Schoolboys under-15 side for the second consecutive year. While in Brisbane, Ponga also began playing Australian rules football and was placed in the Brisbane Lions Academy list after being spotted at a representative rugby league match where he was considered an outstanding prospect.

In December 2013, then 15-year-old Ponga signed a four-year contract with the North Queensland Cowboys. He was pursued by six professional clubs from across three different sports, turning down the Broncos, Melbourne Storm, Sydney Roosters, Queensland Reds and Brisbane Lions to sign with the Townsville-based NRL club. The Lions continued to pursue Ponga after he committed to the Cowboys and it was later revealed he was one month away from sensationally converting to Australian rules football and signing a four-year contract with the Lions in the latter half of 2016.

== Playing career ==
=== Early career ===
Ponga played for the North Queensland Cowboys Holden Cup team from 2015 to 2017, playing 44 games, scoring 32 tries and kicking 42 goals for 212 points in his U20s career.

=== 2015 ===
Ponga moved to Townsville where he attended Ignatius Park College, played for the Townsville Stingers in the Mal Meninga Cup. Later on the year Ponga represented Australia in the under 18s touch football at the 2015 Youth Trans Tasman series. In January, he was a member of the QAS Emerging under-18 Origin squad. In August, he made his NYC debut for the Cowboys, coming off the bench in his side's 50–6 victory over the Parramatta Eels in Round 20. It was later revealed that he had missed five months of the season fighting a life-threatening brain infection. He finished the year as the Cowboys' starting fullback, scoring 8 tries in 8 games. In October, he was invited to train with the New Zealand national team in preparation for their tour of Great Britain. In November, he joined the Cowboys' 2016 first grade squad for pre-season training.

=== 2016 ===
In January, Ponga was selected in the QAS under-20s Origin squad. In February, he played in the Cowboys' first-grade side's trial game against the Broncos, scoring a try. In May, Ponga was selected for the Junior Kangaroos and Junior Kiwis but opted not to play. He spent the majority of the season playing for the Cowboys' NYC and was named at fullback in the NYC Team of the Year.

On 16 September, Ponga made his NRL debut on the wing against the Brisbane Broncos in the finals, replacing the injured Antonio Winterstein. Ponga was short from scoring his first NRL try in the 16th minute of the game making a break on the wing getting taken down by Broncos Lock Corey Parker. Since 1987, he is just the sixth player to make his first-grade debut in a finals match. He was contracted to the Cowboys until the end of 2017.

In November, it was reported that Ponga had signed a contract with the Newcastle Knights starting in 2018. On 17 November, when North Queensland returned to pre-season training, head coach Paul Green confirmed the reports and his disappointment saying the contract was in the cooling off period. The deal was officially announced on 28 November as a four-year contract starting in 2018. It was reported that the deal will make him the highest paid teenager in the history of the NRL.

=== 2017 ===
Ponga was named in the Cowboys' squad for the 2017 NRL Auckland Nines tournament in February. At the event, he led the Cowboys to a quarterfinals berth before being eliminated by the Storm. He scored five tries and was named in the team of the tournament alongside teammate Gideon Gela-Mosby. Ponga played his first NRL game at fullback for the Cowboys in Round 3. During the game, he recorded two line break assists, seven tackle breaks and 113 running metres in their 8–30 loss to the Manly Warringah Sea Eagles. He scored his maiden NRL try in the Cowboys' Round 4 victory over the Gold Coast Titans. He was named man of the match in the Cowboys round 8 victory against the Newcastle Knights after scoring two tries.

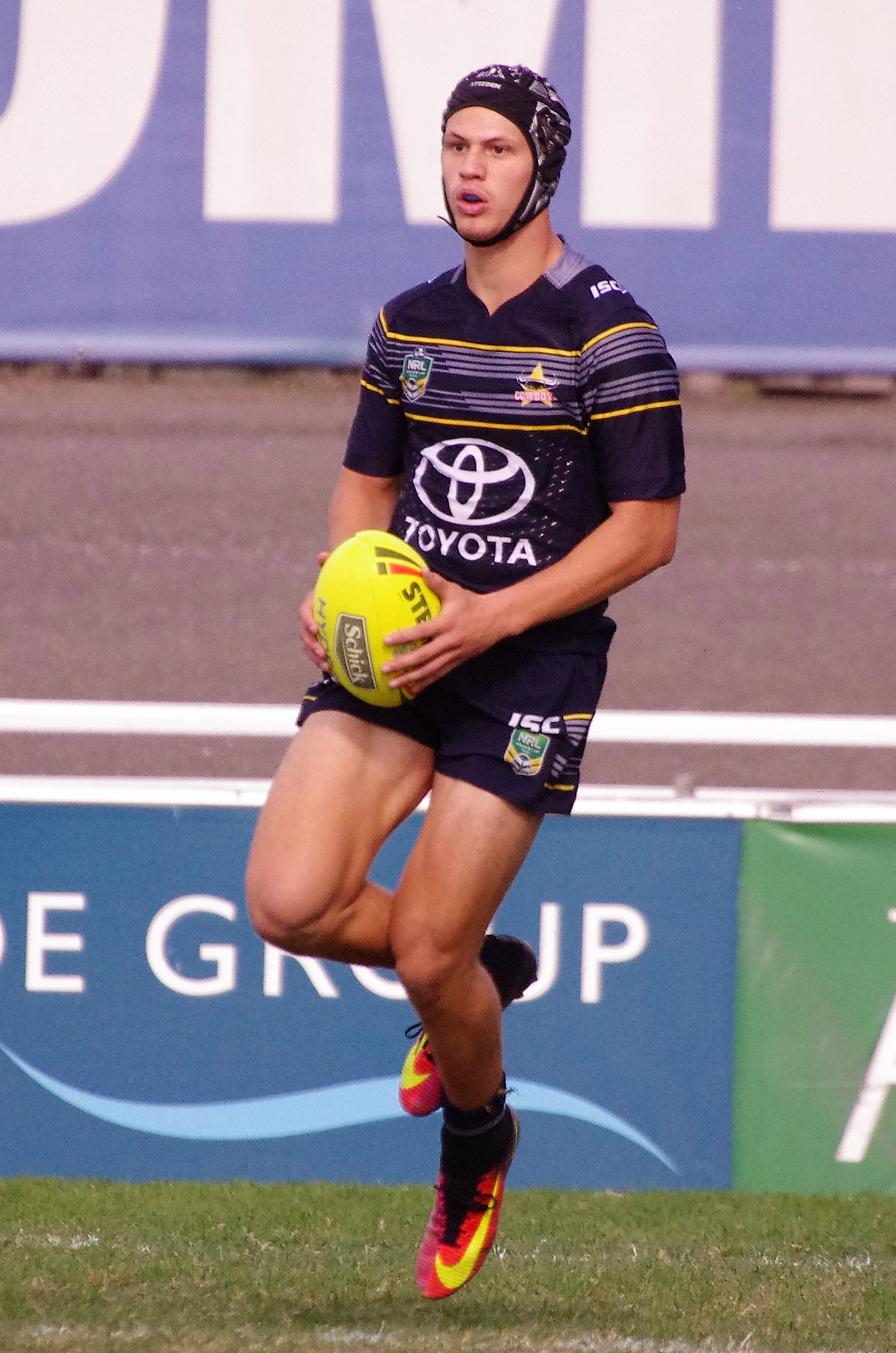
Ponga mid-air for the North Queensland Cowboys in 2017

Ponga returned to the North Queensland first-grade lineup in their round 24 clash against the Cronulla-Sutherland Sharks. During the match, he suffered a shoulder injury. He returned two weeks later in the NYC finals elimination loss to Manly. In September, he was named at fullback in the NYC Team of the Year for the second year in a row, before being announced as one of five finalists for the RLPA Rookie of the Year award.

=== 2018 ===
Ponga was eligible to represent Australia and New Zealand in test football, but confirmed his allegiance to Queensland, and therefore Australia, in January 2018. In round 1 of the 2018 season, he made his debut for the Newcastle Knights in their 19-18 golden point extra-time win over the Manly Warringah Sea Eagles, scoring a try and kicking three goals.

In June, Ponga made his State of Origin debut for Queensland in Game II of the 2018 State of Origin series. He came onto the field from the interchange bench in the 28th minute, playing out of position in the middle of the field. He played 52 minutes, made 29 tackles and made a line break late in the game, coming close to scoring an equalizing try, only to be pulled down by New South Wales fullback James Tedesco before the line in Queensland's 18–14 loss. Former Knights and Australian test halfback Andrew Johns called it 'the best debut in Origin history.'

=== 2019 ===
Ponga was moved to five-eighth to start the 2019 season, however he returned to fullback in round 4.

Ponga attracted controversy late in the season with his response to the media after coach Nathan Brown departed the club, saying "I was at lunch having a nice strawberry thickshake, so I wasn't too sad."

On 7 October 2019, Ponga was named in the Australian side for the 2019 Rugby League World Cup 9s.

=== 2020 ===
In June, Ponga extended his contract with Newcastle until the end of 2024, however the last two years of the deal were options in Ponga's favour.

=== 2021 ===
In round 6 of the 2021 NRL season, Ponga scored two tries in a man of the match performance as Newcastle defeated Cronulla-Sutherland 26–22.

In round 16 against North Queensland, Ponga put in a man of the match performance and scored two tries in Newcastle's 38–0 victory.

In Game three of the 2021 State of Origin series, Ponga returned to the Queensland Origin side after missing out on the last 6 matches due to injury. He played a part in Queensland's 20–18 win to prevent a New South Wales white wash for the series.

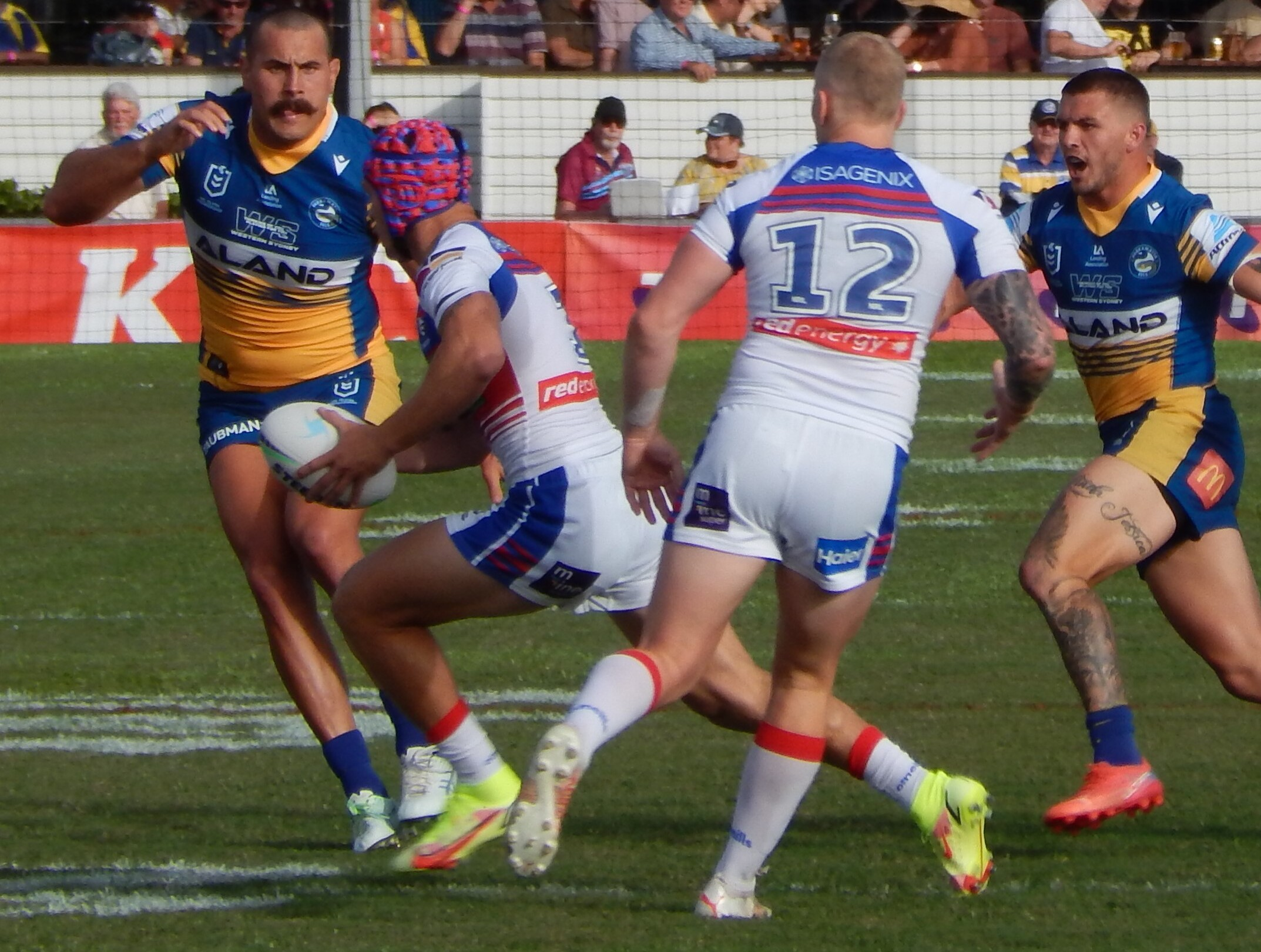
Ponga testing the Parramatta Eels defensive line in 2021

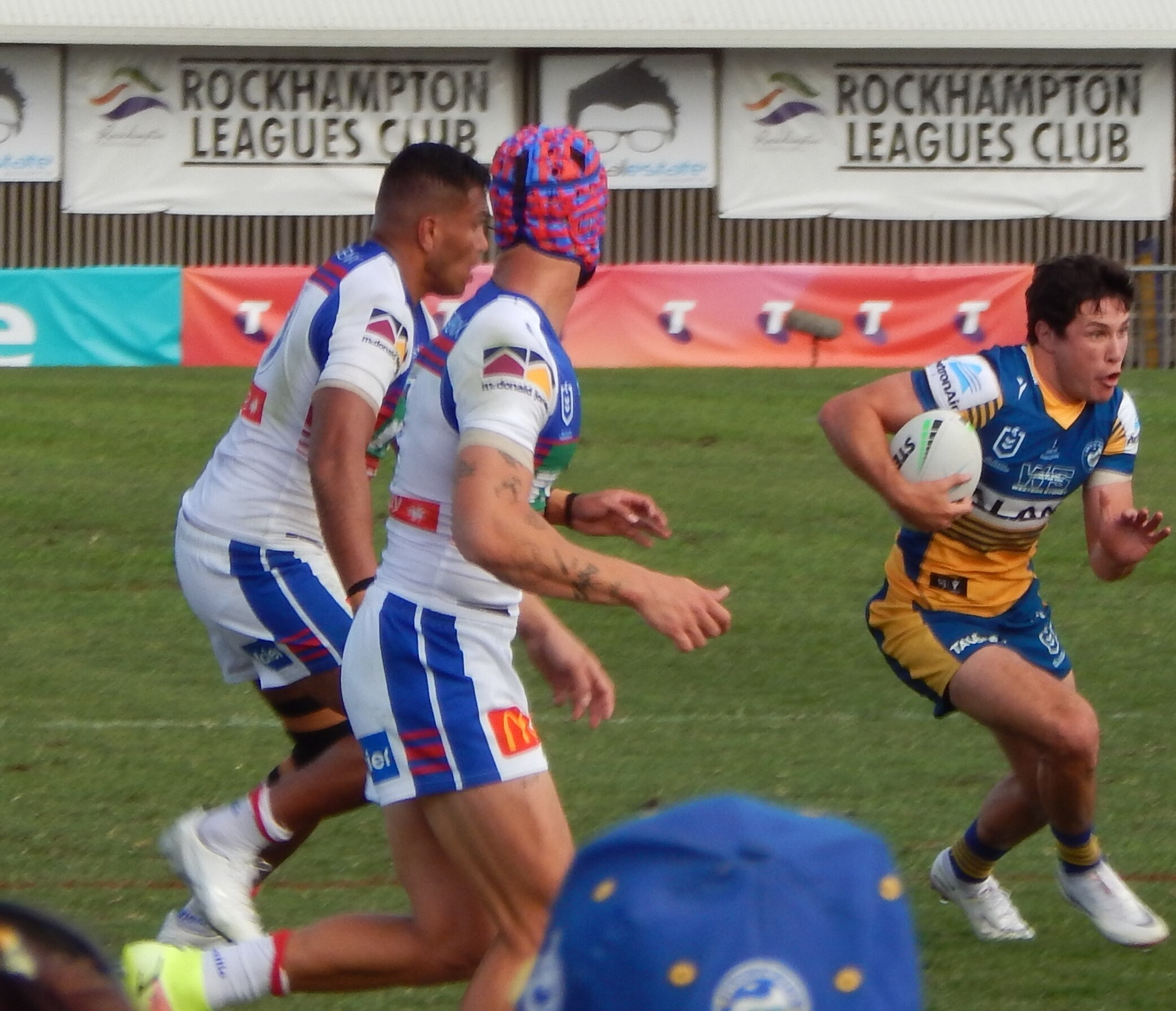
Ponga on defensive duties against Parramatta in 2021

=== 2022 ===
Ponga had until June 2022 to activate the options in his contract for the 2023 and 2024 seasons. In April, he signed a new contract for five years, until the end of 2027, that would replace the existing deal moving into 2023.

On 13 July, Ponga put in a man-of-the-match performance in Game 3, the decider of the 2022 State of Origin series, in a Queensland side missing regular five-eighth Cameron Munster. Ponga collected 299 running metres, 90 of which were kick returns and 75 in post-contact, along with 3 line breaks, 18 tackle breaks and the try that claimed the lead which Queensland would not lose for the remainder of the game. In July, Ponga was ruled out for the remainder of the 2022 NRL season after suffering with concussion. On 15 August, it was revealed that Ponga and teammate Kurt Mann had been ejected from a pub after being found intoxicated in a toilet cubicle by security staff. Ponga and Mann were later drug tested by the NRL under the organisation's drug policy.

=== 2023 ===
In round 2 of the 2023 NRL season, Ponga was taken from the field with a head concussion after just 90 seconds in Newcastle's 14–12 victory over the Wests Tigers. It was Ponga's fourth concussion in ten months. Ponga subsequently travelled to Canada to undergo advanced neurological testing to determine if he would have to retire, but tests showed no signs of brain damage. After a brief absence, he returned in round 8. Despite a slow start, Ponga regained form as the Knights went on to win 9 straight games heading in to the finals, raising them from 14th to 5th on the ladder. The team would defeat the Canberra Raiders in the first week of finals but lost to the New Zealand Warriors the following week, eliminating them from the competition. Ponga won the 2023 Dally M medal, labeling him as player of the year.

=== 2024 ===
In the week following a narrow 24–22 loss to the Sydney Roosters in round 6, it was reported that Ponga was suffering from a hip injury. Ponga was named in the squad to play the Canterbury-Bankstown Bulldogs in round 7 despite carrying a noticeable limp during the warmup. Ponga played through the first half with the limp, however at half time spoke to a trainer regarding a foot injury he had picked up during the half. Ponga played the beginning of the second half before withdrawing, and the side would lose to the Bulldogs 36–12. On 22 April, it was announced that Ponga would be ruled out for an indefinite period as a result of the foot injury. Ponga played 16 games for Newcastle in the 2024 NRL season as the club finished 8th and qualified for the finals. He played in their elimination finals loss against North Queensland.

=== 2025 ===
In May, Ponga was selected by Queensland for game one of the 2025 State of Origin series. In round 14 of the 2025 NRL season, Ponga scored the winning try in golden point extra-time as Newcastle defeated Manly-Warringah 26–22. On 1 July, Ponga was ruled out for an indefinite period after suffering a lisfranc injury in Newcastle's round 17 loss against Canberra. Ponga was limited to only 13 matches with Newcastle in the 2025 NRL season as Newcastle finished with the Wooden Spoon.

=== 2026 ===
In March 2026, Ponga announced that he would switch allegiance from Australia to New Zealand in international rugby league competitions. In round 2 of the 2026 NRL season Ponga suffered a hamstring injury in Newcastle's win over Manly. He was later ruled out for a minimum of six weeks. On 25 April, Newcastle announced that Ponga had re-signed with the club until the end of 2030 with a two year option in the clubs favour. In May, Ponga was selected by Queensland for game one in the 2026 State of Origin series. Ponga was sent off in the match for a shoulder charge during the second half when Queensland were leading 20-6. Queensland would go on to lose the game 22-20.

In September and October 2026, Ponga played a massive part in the Newcastle Knights run to the NRL Grand Final. He scored a length-of-the-field try in the first half of the NRL Grand Final against the Sydney Roosters. Newcastle went on to lose the game 19-18.

He made his New Zealand international début in the 24-22 2026 Rugby League World Cup opening game defeat to Australia; he scored 2 tries and suffered a broken left forearm, requiring surgery. He returned to New Zealand's starting side three weeks later and was a key figure in the side's 34–10 semi-final victory over Tonga.

== Achievements and accolades ==
=== Individual ===
- NYC Team of the Year: 2016, 2017
- 2022 State of Origin series
- 2023 Dally M Medal Medallist
- 2023 Fullback of the Year
- 2026 IRL Golden Boot Award.

== Statistics ==
=== NRL ===
*denotes season competing

Season	Team	Matches	T	G	A	F/G	Pts
2016	North Queensland Cowboys	2	0	0	0	0	0
2017	North Queensland Cowboys	7	3	0	0	0	12
2018	Newcastle Knights	20	6	27	11	0	78
2019	Newcastle Knights	20	11	48	9	0	140
2020	Newcastle Knights	19	10	46	14	0	132
2021	Newcastle Knights	15	8	10	14	0	52
2022	Newcastle Knights	14	4	12	6	0	40
2023	Newcastle Knights	20	9	46	21	0	144
2024	Newcastle Knights	16	3	46	11	0	104
2025	Newcastle Knights	13	1	19	9	0	42
2026	Newcastle Knights	21	6	37	14	0	98
2027	Newcastle Knights						
Career totals		167	61	291	109	0	826
