= Joseph Tapine =

New Zealand and Maori international rugby league player

Joe Tapine

Personal information
- Full name: Joseph Tapine
- Born: 4 May 1994 (age 32) Wellington, New Zealand
- Height: 190 cm (6 ft 3 in)
- Weight: 106 kg (16 st 10 lb)

Playing information
- Position: Prop, Lock, Second-row
Club
Years	Team	Pld	T	G	FG	P
2014–15	Newcastle Knights	20	1	0	0	4
2016–	Canberra Raiders	240	30	0	0	120
	Total	260	31	0	0	124
Representative
Years	Team	Pld	T	G	FG	P
2016–	New Zealand	30	3	0	0	12
2019–24	Māori All Stars	5	2	0	0	8
- Source: As of 17 November 2026

Joseph Tapine (pronounced /tæpineɪ/; TAH-pih-neh) (born 4 May 1994) is a New Zealand professional rugby league footballer who captains and plays as a prop or lock forward for the Canberra Raiders in the National Rugby League and New Zealand and New Zealand Māori at international level.

Tapine previously played for the Newcastle Knights in the NRL. He played in the backrow as a lock or second-row forward earlier in his career.

== Background ==
Tapine was born in Wellington, New Zealand, and is of Māori descent.

Tapine played his junior rugby league for the Harbour City Eagles. He then joined the Wellington Orcas in the New Zealand Rugby League National Competition.

== Playing career ==
=== Early career ===
In 2013, Tapine joined the Newcastle Knights on a 1-year contract before re-signing for a further 3 years during the year. He played for the Knights' NYC team in 2013 and 2014. On 13 October 2013, Tapine played for the Junior Kiwis against the Junior Kangaroos, starting at second-row in the 38-26 loss at WIN Stadium.

=== 2014 ===
In Round 9 of the 2014 NRL season, Tapine made his NRL debut for the Newcastle Knights against the Penrith Panthers, playing off the interchange bench in the 32-10 loss at Hunter Stadium. Tapine finished off his debut year in the NRL with him playing in 7 matches for the Knights. On 2 September 2014, Tapine was named on the interchange bench in the 2014 NYC Team of the Year. On 18 October 2014, Tapine again played for the Junior Kiwis against the Junior Kangaroos, starting at second-row in the 15-14 win at Mt Smart Stadium. On 24 November 2014, Tapine was charged with occasioning grievous bodily harm following an incident in September 2014 which left another man with a broken jaw.

=== 2015 ===
On 23 June 2015, Tapine had assault charges dropped after a magistrate found prosecutors could not prove he was not acting in self-defence. In Round 22 against the Sydney Roosters, Tapine scored his first NRL career try in the 38-22 loss at Hunter Stadium. Tapine improved on his previous season, playing in 13 matches and scoring 1 try in the 2015 NRL season.

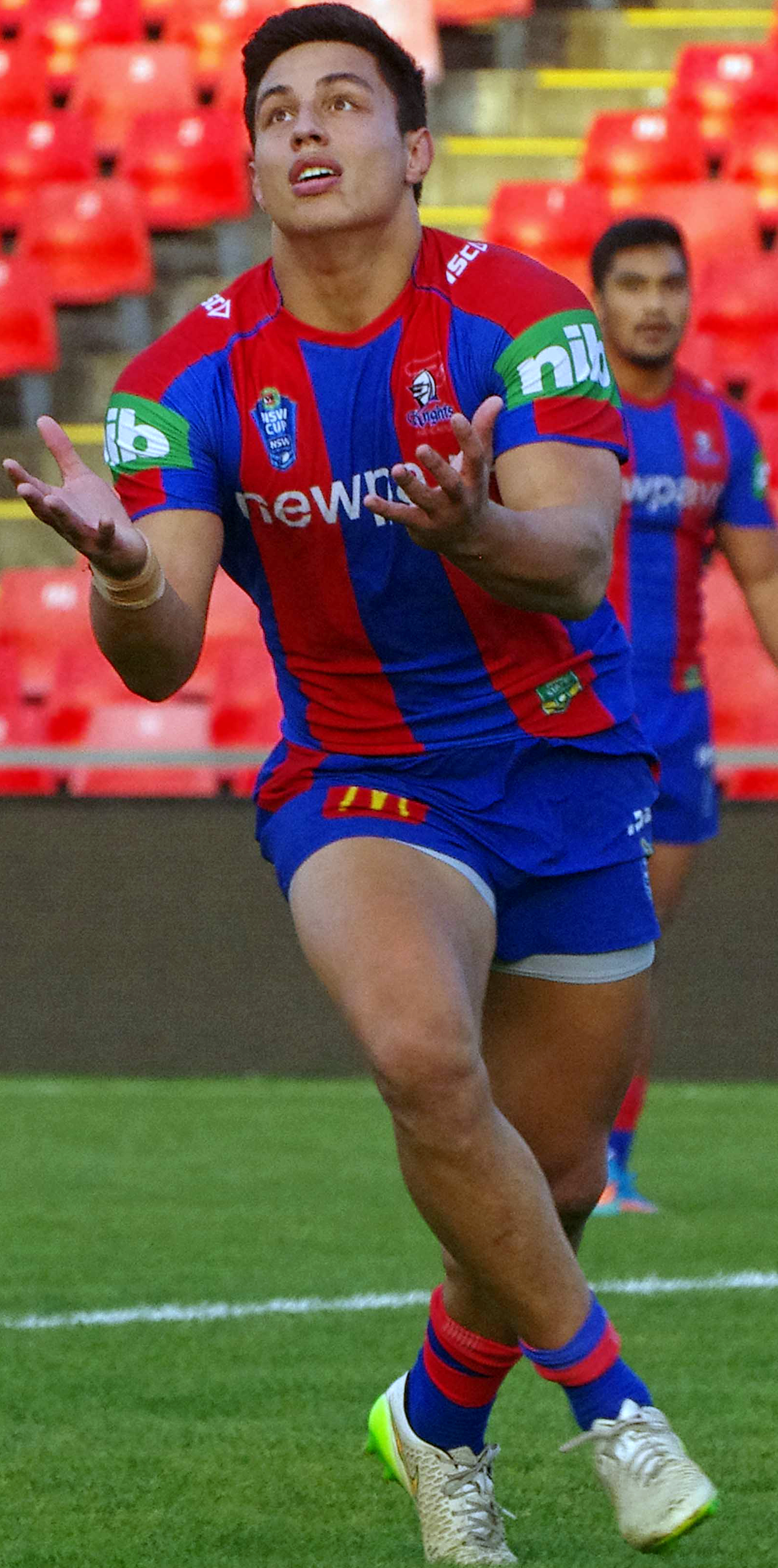
Tapine playing for the Newcastle Knights in the NSW Cup

On 27 September 2015, Tapine played in the Knights' 2015 New South Wales Cup Grand Final against the Wyong Roos in the 20-10 victory at Parramatta Stadium.

=== 2016 ===
On 11 February 2016, Tapine signed a 3-year contract with the Canberra Raiders starting in 2017. After facing spending the year being banished from the Knights first grade squad to waste away in the NSW Cup, however, on 23 February 2017, the Knights agreed to release him from the remainder of his contract, freeing him to join the Raiders immediately. In Round 3, Tapine made his club debut for the Canberra Raiders against the Newcastle Knights, playing off the interchange bench in the 24-24 all draw. In Round 12 against the Canterbury-Bankstown Bulldogs, Tapine scored his first and second club tries for the Raiders in the 32-20 win at Canberra Stadium. Tapine finished the 2016 NRL season with him playing in 25 matches and scoring 4 tries in his first year with the Canberra Raiders. On 4 October 2016, Tapine was selected in the New Zealand Kiwis 24-man squad for the 2016 Four Nations. On 11 November 2016, Tapine made his international debut for the New Zealand Kiwis against Scotland, playing off the interchange bench in the shock 18-18 all draw at Derwent Park. Tapine played in 2 matches in the tournament including playing in the 2016 Four Nations Final match against Australia, off the interchange bench in the 34-8 loss at Anfield.

=== 2017 ===
Tapine finished the 2017 NRL season with him playing in 22 matches and scoring 3 tries for the Raiders. Tapine was named in the New Zealand Kiwis 24-man squad for the 2017 Rugby League World Cup. On 4 November, he scored his first international try for New Zealand against Scotland in the 74-6 smashing win at Christchurch Stadium. Tapine played in all 4 matches and scored 1 try in the Kiwis shock disappointing campaign.

=== 2018 ===
On 24 June 2018, Tapine played for New Zealand against England in the historical test match set in Denver, USA, starting at second-row in the 36-18 loss at Mile High Stadium. Tapine played in 16 matches and scored 6 tries for the Raiders in the 2018 NRL season. After being sidelined at the end of the year due to a broken thumb on 1 October 2018, Tapine was selected in the Kiwis 23-man squad for their tour of England and the test match against Australia. Tapine played in 2 matches of the Baskerville Shield matches against England. On 24 October 2018, Tapine extended his contract with the Raiders for another 4-years, to the end of the 2023 season.

=== 2019 ===
On 15 February, Tapine represented the Maori All Stars against the Indigenous All Stars in the 2019 All Stars match, playing off the interchange bench in the 34-14 loss at AAMI Park.

Tapine made a total of 17 appearances for Canberra as the club reached the grand final for the first time in 25 years. Tapine played at lock in the 2019 NRL Grand Final as Canberra were defeated by the Sydney Roosters at ANZ Stadium.

=== 2020 ===
Tapine played 21 games and scored 4 tries in the 2020 NRL season. He played in all three of Canberra's finals games including the preliminary final loss against Melbourne.

=== 2021 ===
Tapine made a total of 19 appearances for Canberra in the 2021 NRL season. The club would finish the year in 10th place on the table and miss out on the finals.

=== 2022 ===
Tapine played a total of 25 matches for Canberra in the 2022 NRL season as the club finished 8th on the table and qualified for the finals. Tapine played in both finals matches as Canberra were eliminated in the second week by Parramatta.

=== 2023 ===
Tapine played a total of 24 matches for Canberra in the 2023 NRL season as the club finished 8th on the table and qualified for the finals. Tapine played in the clubs elimination finals loss against Newcastle.

=== 2024 ===
Tapine played 24 games for Canberra in the 2024 NRL season as the club finished 9th on the table.

=== 2025 ===
Tapine played 23 games for Canberra in the 2025 NRL season as the club claimed the Minor Premiership. He played in both finals matches as Canberra went out in straight sets losing to both Brisbane and Cronulla.

=== 2026 ===
On 3 April, Tapine quietly re-signed with the Canberra outfit until the end of 2028. Tapine played every game for Canberra in the 2026 NRL season as the club finished 11th on the table and missed the finals.

== Statistics ==
Year	Team	Games	Tries	Pts
2014	Newcastle Knights	7		
2015	Newcastle Knights	13	1	4
2016	Canberra Raiders	25	4	16
2017	Canberra Raiders	22	3	12
2018	Canberra Raiders	16	6	24
2019	Canberra Raiders	17	2	8
2020	Canberra Raiders	21	4	16
2021	Canberra Raiders	19	2	8
2022	Canberra Raiders	25	2	8
2023	Canberra Raiders	24	1	4
2024	Canberra Raiders	24		
2025	Canberra Raiders	23	5	20
2026	Canberra Raiders	22	1	4
2027	Canberra Raiders			
	Totals	259	31	124
