= 2026 Men's Rugby League World Cup Pools B & C =

Rugby League World Cup results

Pools B and C of the 2026 Rugby League World Cup were two of the three pools in the 2026 Rugby League World Cup. Pool B comprised automatic qualifiers England, Lebanon and Samoa. Pool C comprised hosts Papua New Guinea, automatic qualifiers Tonga, and France, who qualified through the Northern Hemisphere play-offs.

Rather than playing the other two teams in their pool, each nation played the three teams from the other pool.

== Standings ==
Pos	Pool	Team	Pld	W	D	L	PF	PA	PD	Pts	Qualification
1	C	Tonga	3	3	0	0	86	30	+56	6	Advance to knockout stage
2	B	Samoa	3	2	0	1	160	30	+130	4	Advance to knockout stage
3	B	England	3	2	0	1	128	42	+86	4	
4	C	Papua New Guinea (H)	3	1	0	2	60	116	−56	2	
5	B	Lebanon	3	1	0	2	42	98	−56	2	
6	C	France	3	0	0	3	24	184	−160	0	

Source: Source
Rules for classification: Pool stage tiebreakers
(H) Hosts

== Matches ==
=== Samoa vs France ===
16 October 2026
17:45 AEDT (UTC+11:00)

Samoa	78–4	France
Tries: 14; Mariner 2'; Ioelu 5', 80'; McEwen 7'; Fa'alogo 13', 36', 63', 67'; Tabuai-Fidow 17'; Crichton 42'; Blore 55'; Harris-Tavita 70'; Tago 74'; Molo 77'; Goals: 11; Crichton (11/15) 4', 6', 8', 19', 38', 44', 57', 71', 76', 78', 80'	1st: 34–4; 2nd: 44–0; Report (NRL); Report (IRL)	Tries: 1 Aispuro-Bichet 24'; Goals: 0 Mourgue (0/1)

Western Sydney Stadium, Sydney
Attendance: 13,174
Referee: Ashley Klein (Australia)
Video referee: Chris Butler (Australia)
Touch judges: Kieron Irons (Australia), Daniel Luttringer (Australia)
Player of the Match: Francis Manuleleua (Samoa)

Team lists:

FB	1	Hamiso Tabuai-Fidow
WG	2	Brian To'o
CE	3	Izack Tago
CE	4	Stephen Crichton
WG	5	Deine Mariner
FE	6	Chanel Harris-Tavita
HB	7	Jarome Luai (c)
PR	8	Francis Molo
HK	9	Benaiah Ioelu
PR	10	Junior Paulo
SR	11	Connelly Lemuelu
SR	12	Jermaine McEwen
LK	13	Francis Manuleleua
Substitutions:
IC	14	Jazz Tevaga
IC	15	Spencer Leniu
IC	16	Shawn Blore
IC	17	Sualauvi Fa'alogo
Coach:
(Australia) Ben Gardiner

FB	1	Arthur Mourgue
WG	2	Benjamin Laguerre
CE	3	Latrell Siegwalt
CE	4	Guillermo Aispuro-Bichet
WG	5	Leo Darrelatour
FE	6	Cesar Rougé
HB	7	Theo Fages
PR	8	Romain Navarrete
HK	9	Benjamin Garcia (c)
PR	10	Lambert Belmas
SR	11	Arthur Romano
SR	12	Mathieu Jussaume
LK	17	Mathieu Cozza
Substitutions:
IC	14	Amir Bourouh
IC	15	Tiaki Chan
IC	16	Jordan Dezaria
IC	19	Louis Grossemy
Coach:
(France) Laurent Frayssinous

=== Papua New Guinea vs Lebanon ===
17 October 2026
14:25 PNGST (UTC+11:00)

Papua New Guinea	42–18	Lebanon
Tries: 7 Voro 7'; Derby 19'; Putt 30'; Glare 42'; Kapinias 47'; Martin 71'; Biondi-Odo 74'; Goals: 7 Martin (7/7) 8', 21', 31', 43', 49', 72', 74'	1st: 18–12; 2nd: 24–6; Report (NRL); Report (IRL)	Tries: 3 Miski 35', 53'; Sukkar 39'; Goals: 3 Conti (3/3) 37', 40', 55'

PNG Football Stadium, Port Moresby
Attendance: 11,624
Referee: Grant Atkins (Australia)
Video referee: Liam Kennedy (Australia)
Touch judges: Jarrod Cole (Australia), Jarrod Cole (Australia)
Player of the Match: Gairo Voro (Papua New Guinea)

Team lists:

FB	1	Morea Morea
WG	2	Robert Derby
CE	3	Zac Laybutt
CE	4	Nene Macdonald
WG	5	Dudley Dotoi
FE	6	Gairo Voro
HB	14	Finley Glare
PR	8	Valentine Richard
HK	9	Edwin Ipape
PR	10	Luca Moretti
SR	11	Rhyse Martin (c)
SR	12	Nixon Putt
LK	15	Liam Horne
Substitutions:
IC	7	Bailey Biondi-Odo
IC	13	Jack de Belin
IC	16	Epel Kapinias
IC	17	Sylvester Namo
Coach:
(Australia) Jason Demetriou

FB	1	Jacob Kiraz
WG	2	Tony Francis
CE	3	Michael Gabrael
CE	4	Jordan Samrani
WG	5	Jason Saab
FE	6	Khaled Rajab
HB	7	Alex Conti
PR	8	Jaxson Rahme
HK	9	Yehya Ayache
PR	10	James Roumanos
SR	11	Tony Sukkar
SR	15	Mikael Ibrahim
LK	13	Alex Twal (c)
Substitutions:
IC	14	Moustafa Dirani
IC	16	Jalal Bazzaz
IC	19	Abbas Miski
IC	20	Tupou Francis
Coach:
(Australia) Michael Cheika

=== England vs Tonga ===
17 October 2026
17:05 AWST (UTC+08:00)

England	12–30	Tonga
Tries: 2 Brimson 45'; Young 62'; Goals: 2 Savala (2/2) 47', 63'	1st: 0–10; 2nd: 12–20; Report (NRL); Report (IRL)	Tries: 4 Utoikamanu 23'; Olakau'atu 52', 70'; Koula 55'; Goals: 8 Katoa (7/8) 24', pen 27', pen 39', 53', 57', pen 60', pen 75'

Perth Rectangular Stadium, Perth
Attendance: 18,302
Referee: Gerard Sutton (Australia)
Video referee: Ashley Klein (Australia)
Touch judges: Ziggy Przeklasa-Adamski (Australia), Adam Munroe (Australia)
Player of the Match: Isaiya Katoa (Tonga)

Team lists:

FB	1	AJ Brimson
WG	2	Dom Young
CE	3	Hugo Savala
CE	4	Herbie Farnworth
WG	5	Zach Eckersley
FE	6	George Williams (c)
HB	7	Harry Smith
PR	8	Max King
HK	9	Brad O'Neill
PR	15	Luke Thompson
SR	11	Junior Nsemba
SR	12	Kai Pearce-Paul
LK	13	Victor Radley
Substitutions:
IC	14	Jez Litten
IC	16	Ethan Havard
IC	17	Sam Walters
IC	20	Ben Currie
Coach:
(England) Brian McDermott

FB	1	Lehi Hopoate
WG	2	Dallin Watene-Zelezniak
CE	3	Toluta'u Koula
CE	4	Robert Toia
WG	5	Jojo Fifita
FE	6	Latu Fainu
HB	7	Isaiya Katoa
PR	8	Addin Fonua-Blake
HK	14	Salesi Foketi
PR	10	Jason Taumalolo (c)
SR	11	Haumole Olakau'atu
SR	12	Siua Wong
LK	13	Tyson Frizell
Substitutions:
IC	15	Stefano Utoikamanu
IC	16	Demitric Vaimauga
IC	17	Leka Halasima
IC	18	Tuimoala Lolohea
Coach:
(Australia) Kristian Woolf

=== Tonga vs Lebanon ===
23 October 2026
20:05 AEDT (UTC+11:00)

Tonga	36–0	Lebanon
Tries: 7 Katoa 12', 79'; Alamoti 20'; Koula 36'; Fifita 43', 73'; Halasima 69'; Goals: 4 Alamoti (1/4) 21'; Lolohea (3/3) 70', 74', 79'	1st: 14–0; 2nd: 22–0; Report (NRL); Report (IRL)

Western Sydney Stadium, Sydney
Attendance: 25,065
Referee: Liam Moore (England)
Video referee: Grant Atkins (Australia)
Touch judges: Ziggy Przeklasa-Adamski (Australia), Jarrod Cole (Australia)
Player of the Match: Tolutau Koula (Tonga)

Team lists:

FB	1	Lehi Hopoate
WG	2	Sione Katoa
CE	3	Toluta'u Koula
CE	4	Paul Alamoti
WG	5	Jojo Fifita
FE	18	Latu Fainu
HB	6	Tuimoala Lolohea
PR	8	Addin Fonua-Blake
HK	9	Salesi Foketi
PR	10	Stefano Utoikamanu
SR	11	Haumole Olakau'atu
SR	12	Kulikefu Finefeuiaki
LK	13	Jason Taumalolo (c)
Substitutions:
IC	14	Soni Luke
IC	15	Taniela Paseka
IC	17	Leka Halasima
IC	22	Siua Wong
Coach:
(Australia) Kristian Woolf

FB	1	Jacob Kiraz
WG	2	Tony Francis
CE	3	Michael Gabrael
CE	4	Jordan Samrani
WG	5	Jason Saab
FE	6	Khaled Rajab
HB	7	Alex Conti
PR	10	James Roumanos
HK	8	Jaxson Rahme
PR	16	Jalal Bazzaz
SR	11	Tony Sukkar
SR	19	Abbas Miski
LK	13	Alex Twal (c)
Substitutions:
IC	9	Moustafa Dirani
IC	12	Mikael Ibrahim
IC	15	Tupou Francis
IC	18	Joseph Nohra
Coach:
(Australia) Michael Cheika

=== Papua New Guinea vs Samoa ===
24 October 2026
14:25 PNGST (UTC+11:00)

Papua New Guinea	6–64	Samoa
Tries: 1 Biondi-Odo 18'; Goals: 1 Martin (1/1) 18'; Sin bin: Derby (yellow card) 63' to 73'	1st: 6–14; 2nd: 0–50; Report (NRL); Report (IRL)	Tries: 13; Fa'alogo 1', 44'; Leniu 30'; Crichton 36'; Manuleleua 47'; Tabuai-Fidow 52', 68'; To'o 58'; Blore 65', 77'; Volkman 66'; Tago 70'; Mariota 79'; Goals: 6 Crichton (1/3) 30'; Harris-Tavita (2/6) 46', 67'; Volkman (3/4) 70', 72', 79'

PNG Football Stadium, Port Moresby
Attendance: 15,008
Referee: Chris Kendall (England)
Video referee: Liam Kennedy (Australia)
Touch judges: Kieren Irons (Australia), Daniel Luttringer (Australia)
Player of the Match: Francis Manuleleua (Samoa)

Team lists:

FB	1	Morea Morea
WG	2	Robert Derby
CE	3	Zac Laybutt
CE	18	Rodrick Tai
WG	5	Dudley Dotoi
FE	6	Gairo Voro
HB	7	Bailey Biondi-Odo
PR	8	Epel Kapinias
HK	9	Edwin Ipape
PR	16	Valentine Richard
SR	11	Rhyse Martin (c)
SR	12	Nixon Putt
LK	13	Jack de Belin
Substitutions:
IC	14	Finley Glare
IC	15	Liam Horne
IC	17	Khaiya Waiembi
IC	22	Zev John
Coach:
(Australia) Jason Demetriou

FB	1	Hamiso Tabuai-Fidow
WG	2	Brian To'o
CE	3	Izack Tago
CE	4	Stephen Crichton
WG	5	Sualauvi Fa'alogo
FE	6	Chanel Harris-Tavita
HB	7	Jarome Luai (c)
PR	8	Francis Molo
HK	9	Benaiah Ioelu
PR	10	Junior Paulo
SR	11	Connelly Lemuelu
SR	12	Jermaine McEwen
LK	13	Francis Manuleleua
Substitutions:
IC	15	Spencer Leniu
IC	16	Shawn Blore
IC	17	Ata Mariota
IC	19	Ronald Volkman
Coach:
(Australia) Ben Gardiner

=== England vs France ===
24 October 2026
14:35 AWST (UTC+08:00)

England	82–0	France
Tries: 14; Young 22', 45', 63'; Ashton 24'; Farnworth 26', 34', 39'; Williams 37'; Radley 48'; Litten 58'; Lewis 62', 68'; Welsby 66'; Brimson 77'; Goals: 13; Savala (13/14) 23', 25', 27', 36', 38', 39', 49', 59', 63', 65', 66', 69', 77'	1st: 36–0; 2nd: 46–0; Report (NRL); Report (IRL)

Perth Rectangular Stadium, Perth
Attendance: 10,723
Referee: Adam Gee (Australia)
Video referee: Chris Butler (Australia)
Touch judges: Jon Stone (Australia), Matt Noyen (Australia)
Player of the Match: AJ Brimson (England)

Team lists:

FB	1	AJ Brimson
WG	2	Dom Young
CE	3	Hugo Savala
CE	4	Herbie Farnworth
WG	19	Matty Ashton
FE	6	George Williams (c)
HB	7	Harry Smith
PR	8	Max King
HK	9	Brad O'Neill
PR	10	Luke Thompson
SR	11	Junior Nsemba
SR	12	Kai Pearce-Paul
LK	13	Victor Radley
Substitutions:
IC	14	Jez Litten
IC	17	Sam Walters
IC	18	Jack Welsby
RE	21	Mikey Lewis
Coach:
(England) Brian McDermott

FB	1	Arthur Mourgue
WG	5	Benjamin Laguerre
CE	3	Latrell Siegwalt
CE	4	Roméo Tropis
WG	19	Fouad Yaha
FE	6	Thomas Lacans
HB	7	Theo Fages
PR	8	Romain Navarrete
HK	9	Amir Bourouh
PR	10	Julian Bousquet
SR	11	Arthur Romano
SR	12	Mathieu Jussaume
LK	13	Benjamin Garcia (c)
Substitutions:
IC	2	Guillermo Aispuro-Bichet
IC	15	Lambert Belmas
IC	16	Mathieu Cozza
IC	17	Louis Grossemy
Coach:
(France) Laurent Frayssinous

=== England vs Papua New Guinea ===
30 October 2026
20:05 AEDT (UTC+11:00)

England	34–12	Papua New Guinea
Tries: 6 Ashton 5'; Brimson 11'; Young 18'; Smith 20'; Knowles 68'; Lewis 79'; Goals: 5 Savala (4/5) 6', 12', 21', pen 39'; Smith (1/2) 68'	1st: 24–0; 2nd: 10–12; Report (NRL); Report (IRL)	Tries: 2 Dotoi 44'; Voro 50'; Goals: 2 Martin (2/2) 46', 51'

Wollongong Showground, Wollongong
Attendance: 15,063
Referee: Gerard Sutton (Australia)
Video referee: Todd Smith (Australia)
Touch judges: Dave Munro (Australia), Drew Oultram (Australia)
Player of the Match: Kai Pearce-Paul (England)

Team lists:

FB	1	AJ Brimson
WG	2	Dominic Young
CE	3	Hugo Savala
CE	4	Herbie Farnworth
WG	5	Matty Ashton
FE	6	George Williams (c)
HB	7	Harry Smith
PR	8	Max King
HK	9	Jez Litten
PR	10	Luke Thompson
SR	11	Junior Nsemba
SR	12	Kai Pearce-Paul
LK	13	Morgan Knowles
Substitutions:
IC	14	Mikey Lewis
IC	15	Sam Walters
IC	16	Ethan Havard
IC	22	Kallum Watkins
Coach:
(England) Brian McDermott

FB	1	Zac Laybutt
WG	2	Robert Derby
CE	3	Josh Feledy
CE	16	Robert Mathias
WG	5	Dudley Dotoi
FE	6	Gairo Voro
HB	7	Bailey Biondi-Odo
PR	8	Epel Kapinias
HK	13	Liam Horne
PR	18	Valentine Richard
SR	11	Rhyse Martin (c)
SR	12	Nixon Putt
LK	10	Luca Moretti
Substitutions:
IC	4	Nene Macdonald
IC	14	Finley Glare
IC	15	Jacob Taulani
IC	17	Sanny Wabo
Coach:
(Australia) Jason Demetriou

=== Lebanon vs France ===
1 November 2026
17:50 AEDT (UTC+11:00)

Lebanon	24–20 (g.p.)	France
Tries: 4 Conti 3'; Gabrael 45'; Francis 60'; Miski 84'; Goals: 4 Conti (4/6) 5', pen 24', 47', pen 75'; Sin bin: Twal (yellow card) 76' to 84'	1st: 8–6; 2nd: 12–14; Golden point: 4–0; Report (NRL); Report (IRL)	Tries: 3 Bourouh 31'; Aispuro-Bichet 52'; Rouge 70'; Goals: 3 Mourgue (3/3) 32', 54', 71'; Field goals: 1 Mourgue 2pt 79'; Sin bin: Bousquet (yellow card) 76' to 84'

Western Sydney Stadium, Sydney (Note: Match was a double-header with the Tonga v Samoa fixture.)
Attendance: 29,411
Referee: Liam Moore (England)
Video referee: Todd Smith (Australia)
Touch judges: Matt Noyen (Australia), Jon Stone (Australia)
Player of the Match: Alex Conti (Lebanon)

Team lists:

FB	1	Jacob Kiraz
WG	2	Tony Francis
CE	3	Michael Gabrael
CE	4	Jordan Samrani
WG	5	Jason Saab
FE	18	Shadi Hammoud
HB	7	Alex Conti
PR	8	Jaxson Rahme
HK	9	Moustafa Dirani
PR	10	James Roumanos
SR	11	Tony Sukkar
SR	12	Abbas Miski
LK	13	Alex Twal (c)
Substitutions:
IC	15	Tupou Francis
IC	16	Jalal Bazzaz
IC	17	Khalil Rahme
IC	19	Mikael Ibrahim
IC	20	Ibrahim El Labban
IC	21	Cameron Kanaan
Coach:
(Australia) Michael Cheika

FB	1	Arthur Mourgue
WG	2	Leo Darrelatour
CE	3	Guillermo Aispuro-Bichet
CE	4	Roméo Tropis
WG	5	Benjamin Laguerre
FE	6	César Rougé
HB	7	Thomas Lacans
PR	8	Romain Navarrete
HK	9	Alrix Da Costa
PR	10	Julian Bousquet
SR	11	Mathieu Cozza
SR	12	Mathieu Jussaume
LK	13	Benjamin Garcia (c)
Substitutions:
IC	14	Amir Bourouh
IC	15	Lambert Belmas
IC	16	Jordan Dezaria
IC	17	Jowasa Drodrolagi
IC	18	Theo Fages
IC	19	Fouad Yaha
Coach:
(France) Laurent Frayssinous

=== Tonga vs Samoa ===
1 November 2026
20:05 AEDT (UTC+11:00)

Tonga	20–18	Samoa
Tries: 3 Toia 26'; Fifita 45'; Fonua-Blake 72'; Goals: 4 Katoa (4/4) 27', pen 35', 47', 74'	1st: 8–4; 2nd: 12–14; Report (NRL); Report (IRL)	Tries: 4 To'o 37', 50'; Tabuai-Fidow 62'; Volkman 67'; Goals: 1 Harris-Tavita (0/2); Volkman (1/2) 69'

Western Sydney Stadium, Sydney (Note: Match was a double-header with the Lebanon v France fixture.)
Attendance: 29,411
Referee: Adam Gee (Australia)
Video referee: Chris Butler (Australia)
Touch judges: Ziggy Przeklasa-Adamski (Australia), Daniel Luttringer (Australia)
Player of the Match: Robert Toia (Tonga)

Team lists:

FB	1	Lehi Hopoate
WG	2	Dallin Watene-Zelezniak
CE	3	Toluta'u Koula
CE	4	Robert Toia
WG	5	Jojo Fifita
FE	6	Tuimoala Lolohea
HB	7	Isaiya Katoa
PR	8	Addin Fonua-Blake
HK	9	Salesi Foketi
PR	10	Jason Taumalolo (c)
SR	11	Haumole Olakau'atu
SR	12	Siua Wong
LK	13	Tyson Frizell
Substitutions:
IC	14	Soni Luke
IC	15	Stefano Utoikamanu
IC	16	Demitric Vaimauga
IC	17	Taniela Paseka
IC	18	Leka Halasima
IC	19	Latu Fainu
IC	21	Kulikefu Finefeuiaki
Coach:
(Australia) Kristian Woolf

FB	1	Hamiso Tabuai-Fidow
WG	2	Brian To'o
CE	3	Izack Tago
CE	4	Stephen Crichton
WG	5	Sualauvi Fa'alogo
FE	6	Chanel Harris-Tavita
HB	7	Jarome Luai
PR	8	Francis Molo
HK	9	Benaiah Ioelu
PR	10	Junior Paulo
SR	11	Connelly Lemuelu
SR	12	Jermaine McEwen
LK	13	Francis Manuleleua
Substitutions:
IC	14	Jazz Tevaga
IC	15	Spencer Leniu
IC	16	Shawn Blore
IC	17	Ata Mariota
IC	18	Clayton Faulalo
IC	19	Ronald Volkman
IC	21	Enari Tuala
Coach:
(Australia) Ben Gardiner

== See also ==
- 2026 Men's Rugby League World Cup squads
- 2026 Men's Rugby League World Cup statistics
