= 2026 Men's Rugby League World Cup qualification =

2026 Rugby League World Cup qualification
- Number of teams: 7 (from 4 confederations)

The 2026 Men's Rugby League World Cup qualification decided the teams to join the quarter-finalists from the previous World Cup at the 2026 Rugby League World Cup.

Qualification began on 22 October 2024 with European qualification tournament.

== Background ==
The allocation of teams for the 2026 World Cup was announced on 7 August 2023. The 2026 edition of the Rugby League World Cup would only feature ten men's teams, down from 16 in 2021. The eight quarter-finalists from the previous World Cup achieved automatic qualification, leaving two spots remaining for the qualification process.

The qualification process for the 9th and 10th places was a two-stage process. The first stage was to establish the representatives from each of the four International Rugby League (IRL) confederations (Americas, Asia-Pacific, Europe, and Middle East-Africa) with those representatives advancing to a second and final round of qualification in 2025.

The process announced in August 2023 would have seen qualifying tournaments in all four confederations but subsequent changes by the IRL have changed this. In October 2023 IRL confirmed that only full members of the IRL can take part in the qualifying competition. This left only Cook Islands (Asia-Pacific), Jamaica (Americas) and South Africa (Middle East-Africa) as the only full-member nations for their respective confederations, and therefore they automatically advanced to the second round of qualification.

That left the European confederation as the only one to stage a confederation tournament to decide their second-round slot allocation.

As originally planned, following the conclusion of the European confederation qualification tournament, the 2025 World Series would take place with winners and runners up qualifying for the finals. In March 2025 the IRL announced that as no viable bids to host the World Series had been received, the World Series would be replaced by two single knockout matches, one for the northern hemisphere and one for the southern hemisphere.

== Qualified teams ==
Team	Method of qualification	Date of qualification	Total times qualified	Last time qualified	Current consecutive appearances	Previous best performance
New Zealand	2021 World Cup Group C winners	28 October 2022	17	2021	17	Winners (2008)
England	2021 World Cup Group A winners	29 October 2022	8 (Note: Competed as part of Great Britain in nine previous tournaments, finishing as champions on three occasions (1954, 1960, 1972).)	2021	8	Runners-up (1975, 1995, 2017)
Australia	2021 World Cup Group B winners	29 October 2022	17	2021	17	Winners (12 times)
Fiji	2021 World Cup Group B runners-up	29 October 2022	7	2021	7	Semi-finals (2008, 2013, 2017)
Lebanon (Note: On 14 March 2024, Lebanon had their membership downgraded from full to affiliate member, however as Lebanon had already qualified for the World Cup, their tournament status is unaffected.)	2021 World Cup Group C runners-up	30 October 2022	4	2021	3	Quarter-finals (2017, 2021)
Tonga	2021 World Cup Group D winners	30 October 2022	7	2021	7	Semi-finals (2017)
Samoa	2021 World Cup Group A runners-up	30 October 2022	7	2021	7	Runners-up (2021)
Papua New Guinea	2021 World Cup Group D runners-up	31 October 2022	9	2021	9	Quarter-finals (2000, 2017, 2021)
France	Northern Hemisphere play-off winners	25 October 2025	17	2021	17	Runners-up (1954, 1968)
Cook Islands	Southern Hemisphere play-off winners	9 November 2025	4	2021	2	Group Stage (2000, 2013, 2021)

== European qualifying ==
The European confederation qualification tournament took place in October 2024 and was open to all full member nations as of 15 March 2024. The winner of the tournament advanced to the World Series in 2025.

Teams played semi-finals and a final. The semi-finals were based on IRL Rank with highest-ranked playing lowest-ranked and second-highest playing second-lowest. The losing semi-finalists contested a third place playoff; this had no bearing on World Cup qualification, but counted for world ranking points.

=== Bracket ===
Semi-finals
8	France	74
20	Ukraine	8
11	Serbia	0
17	Wales	48

Final
8	France	48
17	Wales	6

=== Semi-finals ===
22 October 2024
17:00 CEST (UTC+02:00)

Serbia	0–48	Wales
	1st: 0–30; 2nd: 0–18; Report	Tries: Fozard, Kear, Walker, Evans, Connor Davies, Butt, Worthington, Coope-Franklin; Goals: Fozard (7/7), Kear (1/1)

Stade Albert Domec, Carcassonne
Attendance: 1,257
Referee: Geoffrey Poumes (France)

Team details
Serbia		Position	Wales
Name	Number	Position	Number	Name
Nikola Cotic	1	FB	1	Billy Walkley
Rajko Trifunovic	2	WG	2	Joe Coope-Franklin
Nick O'Meley	3	CE	3	Mike Butt
David Nofoaluma	4	CE	4	Will Evans
Andrej Mora	5	WG	5	Rhys Williams
Jesse Soric	6	SO	6	Elliot Kear
Vojislav Dedic	7	SH	7	Josh Ralph
Jake O'Meley	8	PR	8	Huw Worthington
Sasha Popovic	9	HK	9	Matty Fozard
Milos Calic	10	PF	10	Ben Evans
Stefan Arsic	11	SR	11	Connor Davies
Nikola Djuric	12	SR	12	Max Clarke
Enis Bibic	13	LF	13	Sam Bowring
Dzavid Jasari	14	IN	14	Curtis Davies
Ilija Cotric	15	IN	15	Matt Ross
Djordje Krnjeta	16	IN	16	Anthony Walker
Marko Jankovic	17	IN	17	Ashton Robinson
Aleksandar Pavlovic	18	RES	18	Fin Yates
Darren Fisher		Coach		Mark Moxon

22 October 2024
19:30 CEST (UTC+02:00)

France	74–8	Ukraine
Tries: Vailhe, Budde, Pedrero (3), Vailhen, Pelissier (2), Zenon, Goffin, Jouffret, Aispuro Bichett (2), Martin; Goals: Albert (6/10), Aispuro Bichett (3/4)	1st: 48–0; 2nd: 26–8; Report	Tries: Skorbach, Polata

Stade Albert Domec, Carcassonne
Attendance: 1,257
Referee: Stephane Vincent (France)

Team details
France		Position	Ukraine
Name	Number	Position	Number	Name
Louis Jouffret	1	FB	1	Yevhhen Davydov
Nittim Pedrero	2	WG	2	Tigris Polata
Guilerno Aispuro Bichett	3	CE	3	Mykhailo Troian
Tanguy Zenon	4	CE	4	Jonah Ngaronoa
Clement Martin	5	WG	5	Danylo Vedler
Lucas Albert	6	SO	6	Oleksandr Skorbach
Thomas Lacans	7	SH	7	Daniel Janissen
Clement Boyer	8	PR	8	Oleksandr Syvokoz
Nolan Lopez-Buttignol	9	HK	9	Dmytro Semerenko
Florien Vailhen	10	PF	10	Volodymyr Karpenko
Jayson Goffin	11	SR	11	Yevhenii Trusov
Hnaloan Budden	12	SR	12	Tom Mencinksy
Mickael Goudemand	13	LF	13	Victor Tereszko
Eloi Pelissier	14	IN	14	Yaroslav Davydov
Tiaki Chan	15	IN	15	Vitalii Puchkov
Hugo Salabio	16	IN	16	Yevhen Checheta
Justin Sangare	17	IN	17	Valentyn Korchak
Laurent Frayssinous		Coach		Dan Beardshaw

=== Final ===
26 October 2024
14:30 CEST (UTC+02:00)

Wales	6–48	France
Tries: Williams; Goals: Fozard (1/1)	1st: 6–20; 2nd: 0–28; Report	Tries: Romano, Rouge (2), Franco, Pelissier, Sangare, Fages, Belmas, Chan; Goals: Rouge (6/9)

Stade Municipal, Saint-Estève
Attendance: 2,150
Referee: Aaron Moore (England)

Team details
Wales		Position	France
Name	Number	Position	Number	Name
Billy Walkley	1	FB	1	Cesar Rouge
Joe Coope-Franklin	2	WG	2	Hakim Miloudi
Mike Butt	3	CE	3	Arthur Romano
Will Evans	4	CE	4	Mathieu Laguerre
Rhys Williams	5	WG	5	Romain Franco
Elliot Kear	6	SO	6	Ugo Tison
Josh Ralph	7	SH	7	Theo Fages
Huw Worthington	8	PR	8	Lambert Belmas
Matthew Fozard	9	HK	9	Alrix Da Costa
Ben Evans	10	PF	10	Tiaki Chan
Connor Davies	11	SR	11	Maxime Stefani
Matt Ross	12	SR	12	Mathieu Cozza
Sam Bowring	13	LF	13	Mickael Goudemand
Curtis Davies	14	IN	14	Eloi Pelissier
Anthony Walker	15	IN	15	Justin Sangare
Ashton Robinson	16	IN	16	Clement Boyer
Sam Grice	17	IN	17	Anthony Marion
Mark Moxon		Coach		Laurent Frayssinous

== Inter-confederation play-offs ==
The 2025 World Series was initially intended be the inter-confederation qualification tournament for the 2026 Rugby League World Cup. The winner and the runners-up were to qualify for the World Cup.

In September 2024, South Africa submitted a proposal to host the World Series, in attempt to strengthen their bids to host the 2028 Women's World Cup and 2030 Men's World Cup.

On 18 March 2025, the International Rugby League announced no viable bid to host the World Series had been made and as such two playoff matches would be held in its place. The Northern Hemisphere playoff will see France host Jamaica as a one-off match, and the Southern Hemisphere playoff will see the Cook Islands host South Africa as a curtain raiser to the men's and women's 2025 Pacific Cup final double header.

France had planned a warm up fixture against Australia ahead of their qualifier (which Australia also wanted as a warm up fixture ahead of the 2025 Ashes series). However, this was vetoed by Australia's Rugby League Players Association and was replaced by two joint training sessions in London.

The Cook Islands participated in the 2025 Pacific Bowl ahead of their playoff, whereas South Africa played a warm-up fixture against Niue on 4 November.

=== Matches ===
25 October 2025
15:30 CEST (UTC+02:00)

France	36–0	Jamaica
Tries: 7 Griffier 8', 78'; Yaha 28', 54'; Séguier 15'; Bousquet 46'; Darrélatour 72'; Goals: 4 Mourgue (4/7)	1st: 16–0; 2nd: 20–0; Report

Stadium Municipal d'Albi, Albi
Attendance: 6,200
Referee: Aaron Moore (England)

Team details
France		Position	Jamaica
Name	Number	Position	Number	Name
Arthur Mourgue	1	FB	1	Ben Jones-Bishop
Léo Darrélatour	2	WG	2	Jack Rampton
Arthur Romano	3	CE	3	Jimmy Morgan
Enzo Griffier	4	CE	4	Christopher Ball
Fouad Yaha	5	WG	5	Jamin Williams
César Rougé	6	SO	6	James Woodburn-Hall
Théo Fages	7	SH	7	Kieran Rush
Jordan Dezaria	8	PR	8	Delaine Gittens-Bedward
Alrix Da Costa	9	HK	9	Ashton Golding (c)
Romain Navarette	10	PF	10	Dec Tomlinson
Louis Grossemy	11	SR	11	AJ Wallace
Paul Séguier	12	SR	12	Keenen Tomlinson
Benjamin Garcia (c)	13	LF	13	Keenan Ramsden
Anthony Marion	14	IN	15	Jordan Andrade
Julian Bousquet	15	IN	16	Leo Evans
Justin Sangaré	16	IN	17	Isaac Coleman
Guillermo Aispuro-Bichet	17	IN	19	Harlen Smith
Ugo Tison (not used)	18	RES	18	Joshua Hudson-Lett (not used)
Laurent Frayssinous		Coach		Jy-mel Coleman

9 November 2025
11:25 AEDT (UTC+11:00)

Cook Islands	58–6	South Africa
Tries: 11; Niukore 39', 66'; Cowley 57', 77'; Ulberg 9'; Moale 23'; Marsters 36'; Iro 51'; Piakura 56'; Teague 74'; Ngatikaura 80'; Goals: 7 Marsters 24', 40', 55' (3/6); Ioka 63', 76', 78' (3/4); Iro 80' (1/1)	1st: 20–6; 2nd: 38–0; Report	Tries: 1 De Vlieg 18'; Goals: 1 Beukes 19' (1/1); Sin bin: Perry (yellow card) 30' to 40'

Western Sydney Stadium, Sydney
Attendance: 3,245
Referee: Wyatt Raymond (Australia)

Team details
Cook Islands		Position	South Africa
Name	Number	Position	Number	Name
Esom Ioka	1	FB	1	Luke De Vlieg
Paul Ulberg	2	WG	2	Niel Beukes
KL Iro (c)	3	CE	3	Callum McMenemy
Reubenn Rennie	4	CE	4	Brynn Du Rand
Teapo Stoltman	5	WG	5	Brady McMillan
Cassius Cowley	6	SO	6	Coby Thomas
Esan Marsters	7	SH	7	Kamren Cryer (c)
Makahesi Makatoa	8	PR	8	Shane Mackenzie
Mason Teague	9	HK	9	Kobe Martin
Davvy Moale	10	PF	10	Jason Smith
Brendan Piakura	11	SR	11	Ethan Sweet
Marata Niukore (c)	12	SR	12	Keegan Turner
Pride Petterson-Robati	13	LF	13	Aden Perry
Rua Ngatikaura	14	IN	14	Reilly Canning
Reuben Porter	15	IN	15	Joshua Hill
Justin Makirere	16	IN	16	Ashley Bull
Rhys Dakin	17	IN	17	Marcelle Corneelsen
Amare Milford (not used)	20	RES	18	Kalum Gulliver-Brown (not used)
Karmichael Hunt		Coach		Darryl Fisher
