= 2026 Rugby League World Cup Group B =

The 2026 Rugby League World Cup Group B may refer to:

- 2026 Men's Rugby League World Cup Pools B & C
- 2026 Women's Rugby League World Cup Group B
- 2026 Wheelchair Rugby League World Cup Group B

== See also ==
- 2026 Rugby League World Cup (disambiguation)
