= Charlie Nohra =

Australian rugby league player

Personal information
- Born: Australia

Playing information
- Position: Prop
Representative
| Years | Team | Pld | T | G | FG | P |
|---|---|---|---|---|---|---|
| 1999–2007 | Lebanon | 10 | 4 | 0 | 0 | 16 |

Charlie Nohra is an Australian rugby league player who represented Lebanon in the 2000 World Cup. He played ten games for Lebanon between 1999 and 2007 and played for the Sydney Bulls in the Jim Beam Cup.
