= Mick Aldous =

Australian RL coach and former rugby league footballer

Personal information
- Full name: Michael Aldous
- Born: 26 November 1960 (age 65) Nowra, New South Wales, Australia

Playing information
- Position: Fullback, Centre, Wing
Club
Years	Team	Pld	T	G	FG	P
1984–85	Canberra Raiders	25	9	0	0	36

Coaching information
Representative
Years	Team	Gms	W	D	L	W%
2004	France	7	3	0	4	43
- Source: As of 10 October 2023

Michael Aldous (born 26 November 1960) is a former Canberra Raiders rugby league footballer and representative coach of French national rugby league team.

== Playing career ==
Raised in Nowra, New South Wales Aldous attended St Joseph's College, Hunters Hill in Sydney and played in the school's rugby union First XV in 1977 & 1978 at five-eighth. He represented at GPS level in both those years and in a New South Wales Schoolboy side in 1978. He was also an excellent schoolboy cricketer captaining St Joseph's, GPS and NSW schoolboy representative cricket XIs in 1978/79 before a career in first grade cricket for the Waverley club in Sydney, as a wicketkeeper batsman.

His professional rugby league career was with the Canberra Raiders. He made twenty-five first grade appearances between 1984 and 1985 as a versatile back at centre, wing and fullback.

== Post playing ==
After injury, caused an early retirement Aldous became an Australian Schoolboys coach in rugby league and took a job as a Development Officer with the NSWRL.

In 2004, Aldous moved to France as a coaching consultant to the French Rugby League Federation. In November 2004, he coached France to a competitive 52–30 loss to the Kangaroos and a 24–20 loss to the Kiwis in Carcassonne.

From 2006 to 2017 he worked as Recruitment Coordinator for the Canberra Raiders. Aldous worked as a secondary school teacher of PDHPE, and Design and Technology at the selective high school Sydney Boys High School.
