= Bailey Biondi-Odo =

PNG international rugby league footballer

Bailey Biondi Odo
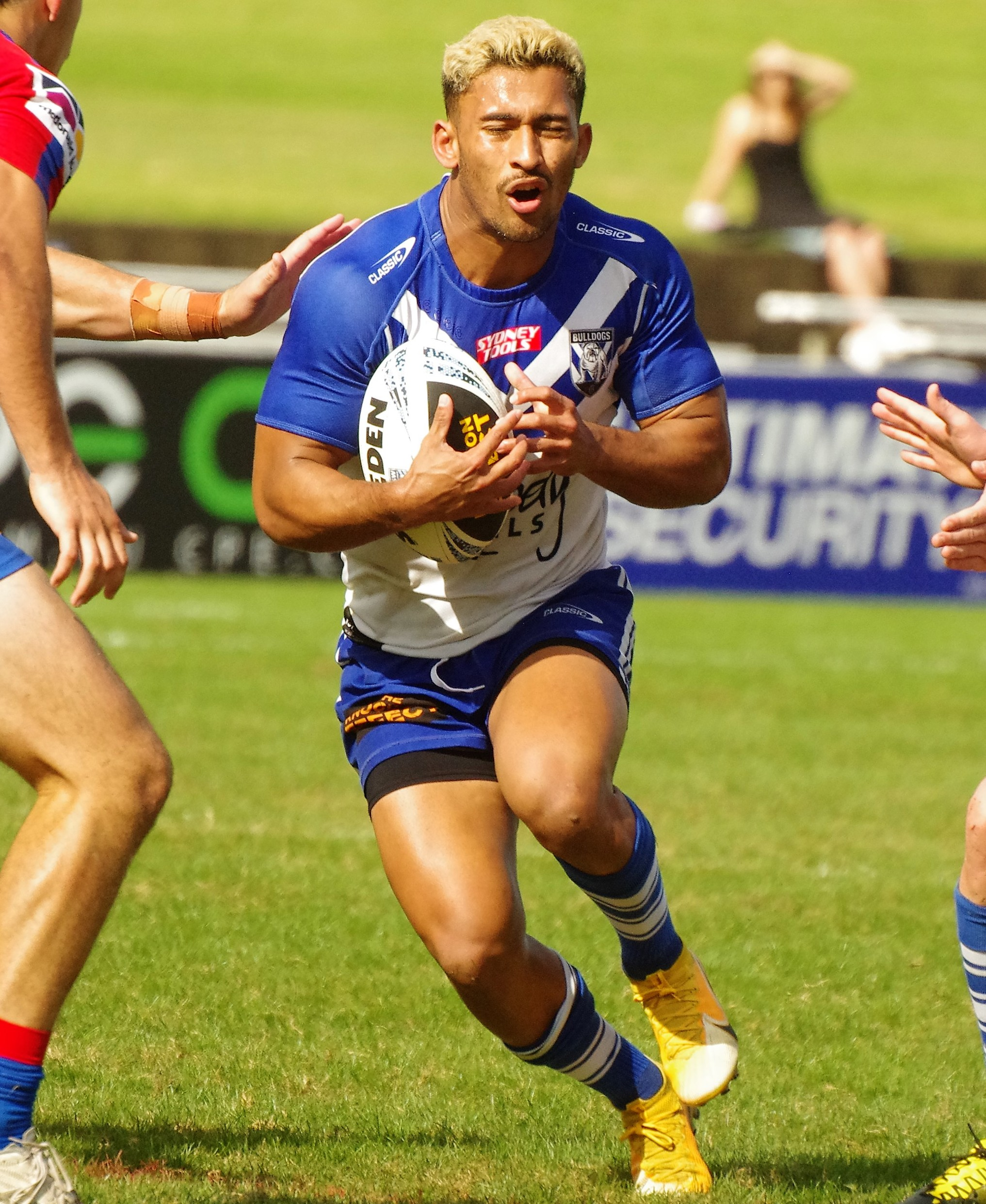

Personal information
- Full name: Bailey Biondi-Odo
- Born: 6 December 2001 (age 24) Mount Isa, Queensland, Australia
- Height: 173 cm (5 ft 8 in)
- Weight: 85 kg (13 st 5 lb)

Playing information
- Position: Halfback, Five-eighth, Hooker
Club
Years	Team	Pld	T	G	FG	P
2021–22	Canterbury Bulldogs	17	2	0	0	8
2027–	New Zealand Warriors	0	0	0	0	0
	Total	17	2	0	0	8
Representative
Years	Team	Pld	T	G	FG	P
2024	Indigenous All Stars	1	0	0	0	0
2026–	Papua New Guinea	3	2	0	0	8
- Source: As of 15 November 2026

Bailey Biondi-Odo (born 6 December 2001) is a Papua New Guinea international rugby league footballer who plays as a halfback for the New Zealand Warriors in the NRL.

He previously played for the Canterbury-Bankstown Bulldogs.

== Playing career ==
A Innisfail Cowboys junior, in Round 16 of the 2021 NRL season, Biondi-Odo made his debut for the Canterbury Bulldogs against the Manly Warringah Sea Eagles which ended in a 66–0 defeat at Western Sydney Stadium.

=== Canterbury Bulldogs ===
In round 18 of the 2021 NRL season, he scored his first try in the NRL during Canterbury's 32–24 loss against the South Sydney Rabbitohs. Biondi-Odo made nine appearances for Canterbury in the 2021 NRL season as the club finished last on the table and collected the Wooden Spoon.

Biondi-Odo made eight appearances for Canterbury in the 2022 NRL season as the club finished 12th on the ladder. During the NSW Cup Elimination Final against the Parramatta Eels, Biondi-Odo was taken off the field with an ACL injury, requiring an ACL reconstruction. Biondi-Odo was dropped from the club's Top 30 for 2023, with Canterbury general manager of football Phil Gould stating he would return to the side in 2024. His place in the Top 30 was taken by Reece Hoffman.

In September 2026, Biondi-Odo signed with the New Zealand Warriors for the 2027 season.

=== Representative ===
He represented the Indigenous All Stars side in the 2024 All Stars match. Between 2024 and 2026, Biondi-Odo played in 43 matches for the Townsville Blackhawks in the Queensland Cup.

He made his Papua New Guinea international début in the 2026 Rugby League World Cup 42-18 win over Lebanon on 17 October 2026, scoring one try.
