= Michael Gabrael =

Lebanon international rugby league footballer

Personal information
- Born: 7 January 2005 (age 21) Sydney, New South Wales, Australia
- Height: 180 cm (5 ft 11 in)
- Weight: 93 kg (14 st 9 lb)

Playing information
- Position: Centre
Club
Years	Team	Pld	T	G	FG	P
2026–	Cronulla Sharks	1	0	0	0	0
Representative
Years	Team	Pld	T	G	FG	P
2026–	Lebanon	3	1	0	0	4
- Source: As of 22 November 2026

Michael Gabrael (born 7 January 2005) is a Lebanese international rugby league footballer who plays as a centre for the Cronulla-Sutherland Sharks in the National Rugby League.

== Background ==
Gabrael was born in Sydney and is of Lebanese descent. He played his junior rugby league for the Wentworthville Magpies and attended Holy Cross College, Ryde before being signed by the Parramatta Eels.

== Playing career ==
=== Early career ===
In 2022, Gabrael played for Parramatta in the Harold Matthews Cup. In 2023, he joined the Canterbury-Bankstown Bulldogs, playing in their SG Ball Cup and Jersey Flegg Cup sides.

On 7 December 2023, Gabrael signed with the Cronulla-Sutherland Sharks on a three-year contract. In 2024, he represented New South Wales under-19 in their win over Queensland. Gabrael spent the 2025 season playing for the Newtown Jets, Cronulla's feeder club, in the New South Wales Cup.

=== 2026 ===
In Round 27 of the 2026 NRL season, Gabrael made his NRL debut in the Cronulla's 24–20 loss to the Melbourne Storm.

On 30 September, he re-signed with Cronulla untiil the end of the 2029 season.

On 17 October, he made his Test debut for Lebanon in their opening game of the World Cup, a 42–18 loss to Papua New Guinea.
