= Mathieu Cozza =

France international rugby league footballer

Personal information
- Full name: Mathieu Cozza
- Born: 12 April 2000 (age 26) France
- Height: 6 ft 1 in (1.86 m)
- Weight: 15 st 8 lb (99 kg)

Playing information
- Position: Prop, Loose forward
Club
Years	Team	Pld	T	G	FG	P
2021–22	Catalans Dragons	10	0	0	0	0
2022(loan)	→ Barrow Raiders	3	0	0	0	0
2023	Featherstone Rovers	22	2	0	0	8
2024–25	Wakefield Trinity	32	4	0	0	16
2026–	Huddersfield Giants	25	0	0	0	0
	Total	92	6	0	0	24
Representative
Years	Team	Pld	T	G	FG	P
2023–	France	5	0	0	0	0
- Source: As of 1 November 2026

Mathieu Cozza (born 12 April 2000) is a French rugby league footballer who plays as a prop or loose forward for the Huddersfield Giants in the Super League.

== Playing career ==
=== Catalans Dragons ===
In 2021 he made his Catalans debut in the Super League against the Salford Red Devils.

=== Barrow Raiders (loan) ===
On 8 June 2022, it was reported that he had joined Barrow on 28-day loan.

=== Featherstone Rovers ===
On 19 October 2022, it was reported that he had signed for Featherstone Rovers.

=== Wakefield Trinity ===
On 26 October 2023, it was reported that he signed for Wakefield Trinity ahead of the 2024 RFL Championship season.

== International ==
He made his début on 29 April 2023 in the 64–0 defeat to England at the Halliwell Jones Stadium.
