= Dudley Dotoi =

Papua New Guinea international rugby league player

Personal information
- Born: 12 September 2003 (age 23) Cairns, Queensland, Australia
- Height: 178 cm (5 ft 10 in)
- Weight: 82 kg (12 st 13 lb)

Playing information
- Position: Wing
Representative
Years	Team	Pld	T	G	FG	P
2024–25	PNG PM's XIII	2	1	0	0	4
2025–	Papua New Guinea	4	2	0	0	8
- Source: As of 16 November 2026

Dudley Dotoi (born 12 September 2003) is a Papua New Guinean international rugby league footballer who plays as a winger for the Townsville Blackhawks in the Queensland Cup.

== Background ==
Dotoi was born in Cairns, Queensland and is of Torres Strait Islander and Papua New Guinean descent.

He played his junior rugby league for the Mareeba Gladiators and Bowen Seagulls and attended Kirwan State High School, where he was selected for the Australian Schoolboys in 2021.

== Playing career ==
In 2021, Dotoi played for the Townsville Blackhawks in the Mal Meninga Cup. In 2022, he signed with the Wests Tigers, playing for the Western Suburbs Magpies in the SG Ball Cup.

In 2023, Dotoi returned to Townsville, playing for the Blackhawks in the Hastings Deering Colts.

In 2024, Dotoi moved up to the Blackhawks' Queensland Cup side. In 2025 and 2026, he finished as the competition's top try scorer and was named in the Team of the Year in both seasons.

On 1 November 2025, Dotoi made his Test debut for Papua New Guinea, starting on the wing and scoring a try in their 50–18 win over Fiji.

On 6 October 2026, he was named in Papua New Guinea's World Cup squad.
