= Louis Grossemy =

France international rugby league footballer

Personal information
- Full name: Louis Grossemy
- Born: 13 March 2003 (age 23) Randwick, New South Wales, Australia
- Height: 6 ft 2 in (1.88 m)
- Weight: 14 st 13 lb (95 kg)

Playing information
- Position: Second-row, Loose forward
Club
Years	Team	Pld	T	G	FG	P
2026–	Toulouse Olympique	7	0	0	0	0
Representative
Years	Team	Pld	T	G	FG	P
2025–	France	3	0	0	0	0
- Source: As of 24 October 2026

Louis Grossemy (born 13 March 2003) is a France international rugby league footballer who plays as a second-row or loose forward for Toulouse Olympique in the Super League.

== Background ==
Grossemy was born in Randwick, New South Wales, Australia.

He is of French heritage via his father.

== Career ==
Grossemy started in the Sydney Roosters Harold Matthews side in 2018 and 2019. He later joined the South Sydney Rabbitohs junior system, playing in their SG Ball team in 2020 and 2021, and their Jersey Flegg side between 2021 and 2024.

In 2023 he won the Knock-On Effect NSW Cup Grand Final with the Rabbitohs. In 2024 he played in the first teams NRL Pre-Season Challenge match against the North Queensland Cowboys. At the end of the year he won the South Sydney Jersey Flegg Player of the Year.

Grossemy moved to the Canterbury-Bankstown Bulldogs ahead of the 2025 season. He featured in 22 New South Wales Cup games in 2025 and 2026.

He joined Toulouse Olympique in July 2026.

Grossemy made his Super League début for TO in July 2026 against St Helens.

He was named in the France squad for the 2026 Rugby League World Cup qualifier with Jamaica in Autumn 2025, making his international debut in that game.

On 1 October 2026 Grossemy was named in the 2026 France World Cup squad.
