= Alex Conti (rugby league) =

Lebanon international rugby league footballer (born 2006)

Personal information
- Born: 7 June 2006 (age 20)

Playing information
- Position: Halfback
Representative
Years	Team	Pld	T	G	FG	P
2026–	Lebanon	3	1	7	0	18
- Source: As of 1 November 2026

Alex Conti (born 7 June 2006) is a Lebanese international rugby league footballer who plays as a halfback for the Canterbury-Bankstown Bulldogs in the National Rugby League.

== Background ==
Conti is of Lebanese and Italian descent.

He played his junior rugby league for Concord Burwood Wolves and attended St Patrick's College, Strathfield before being signed by the Wests Tigers.

== Playing career ==
In 2022 and 2023, Conti played for the Balmain Tigers in the Harold Matthews Cup.

In October 2023, he signed with the Canterbury-Bankstown Bulldogs. In 2024 and 2025, he played for the club's SG Ball Cup and Jersey Flegg Cup sides.

In 2026, Conti spent the season playing for the Bulldogs in the New South Wales Cup, winning the club's NSW Cup Player of the Year award.

On 17 October 2026, Conti made his Test debut for Lebanon in their opening World Cup game against Papua New Guinea. He started at halfback and kicked three goals in a 42–18 loss.
