= Thomas Lacans =

France professional rugby league footballer

Personal information
- Full name: Thomas Lacans
- Born: 7 December 2000 (age 25) Lézignan-Corbières, Aude, France
- Height: 5 ft 7 in (1.71 m)
- Weight: 12 st 8 lb (80 kg)

Playing information
- Position: Stand-off, Scrum-half
Club
Years	Team	Pld	T	G	FG	P
2018–22	FC Lézignan	53	24	0	0	96
2022	Newcastle Thunder	4	1	0	0	4
2023–25	Featherstone Rovers	28	16	15	1	95
2025–	Toulouse Olympique	42	13	0	0	52
	Total	127	54	15	1	247
Representative
Years	Team	Pld	T	G	FG	P
2024–	France	3	0	0	0	0
- Source: As of 1 November 2026

Thomas Lacans (born 7 December 2000) is a French professional rugby league footballer who plays as a stand-off or scrum-half for Toulouse Olympique in the Super League and France at international level.

He has previously played FC Lézignan in the French Super XIII competition, and for the Newcastle Thunder and Featherstone Rovers in the RFL Championship.

== Background ==
Lacans was born in Lézignan-Corbières, Aude, France.

He came through the Catalans Dragons academy.

== Career ==
=== Domestic ===
Lacans played for FC Lézignan in the French Super XIII competition between 2018 and 2022. He won the French Championship in 2021.

He joined the Newcastle Thunder in 2022.

Lacans joined Featherstone Rovers ahead of the 2023 season. He won the RFL Championship Leaders' Shield in 2023, but lost in the semi-finals to the London Broncos, the eventual winners of the competition who were promoted into the Betfred Super League.

He returned to France for family reasons, and joined Toulouse in March 2025.

Lacans won the Championship Grand Final in October 2025, featuring in their narrow victory over the York Knights at the York Community Stadium.

In the summer of 2026 Lacans extended his deal at TO until the end of the 2028 season.

=== International ===
In 2018 Lacans was selected for the French under-19 team to compete in the European Championship in Serbia. The French won the competition, defeating England 26-24 in the final in Belgrade.

He was selected by Laurent Frayssinous for the 2026 World Cup qualifiers and made his debut on October 22 2024 against Ukraine at the Stade Albert Domec in Carcassonne in a 74–8 victory.

On 1 October 2026 Lacans was named in the 2026 France World Cup squad.
