= James Roumanos =

Lebanon international rugby league footballer

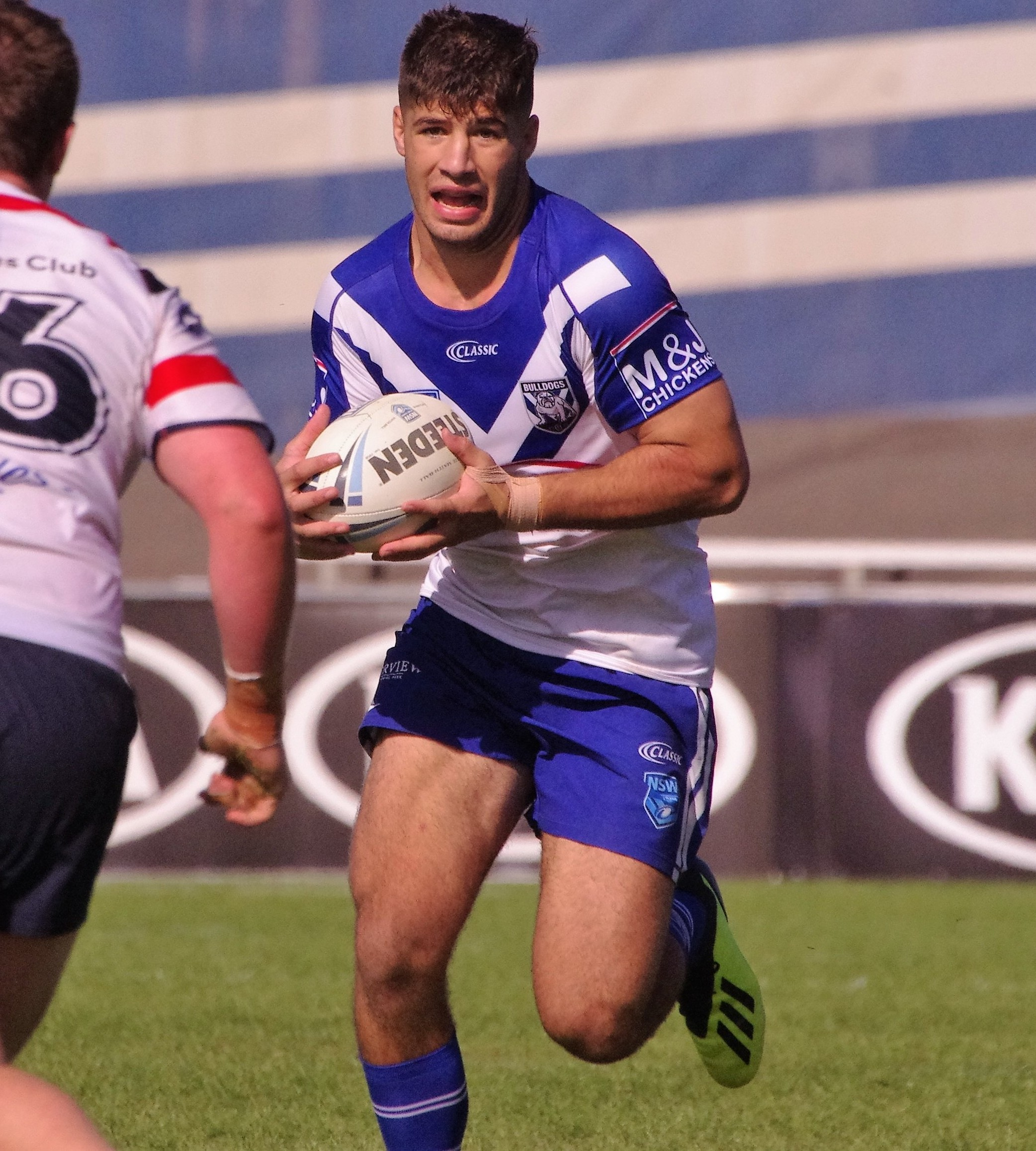

Personal information
- Full name: James Roumanos جيمس رومانوس
- Born: 10 August 1999 (age 27) Greenacre, New South Wales, Australia
- Height: 6 ft 2 in (1.88 m)
- Weight: 16 st 3 lb (103 kg)

Playing information
- Position: Loose forward, Prop, Second-row
Club
Years	Team	Pld	T	G	FG	P
2022	Manly Sea Eagles	1	0	0	0	0
2024–	Toulouse Olympique	71	5	0	0	20
	Total	72	5	0	0	20
Representative
Years	Team	Pld	T	G	FG	P
2019–26	Lebanon	8	0	0	0	0
2019	Lebanon 9s	3	0	0	0	0
- Source: As of 6 November 2026

James Roumanos (Arabic: جيمس رومانوس) (born 10 August 1999) is a Lebanon international rugby league footballer who plays as a loose forward or prop for Toulouse Olympique in the Super League.

He previously played for the Manly Warringah Sea Eagles in the National Rugby League.

== Career ==
=== Canterbury-Bankstown Bulldogs ===
On 31 August 2021, he was one of twelve players who were told by Canterbury that they would not be offered a contract for the 2022 season and would be released at seasons end.

=== Manly-Warringah Sea Eagles ===
In round 25 of the 2022 NRL season, Roumanos made his first grade debut off the bench for the Manly-Warringah Sea Eagles against the Canterbury-Bankstown Bulldogs in a 21-20 loss. He made 3 runs for 39 metres and 8 tackles in 9 minutes.

=== Wests Tigers ===
He signed a contract for Wests Tigers for the 2023 NRL season.

=== Toulouse Olympique ===
On 18 November 2023 it was reported that he had signed for Toulouse Olympique in the RFL Championship on a one-year deal for the 2024 season.

== International ==
Roumanos made his international debut for Lebanon in their 56-14 loss to Fiji in the 2019 Pacific Test.
