= Amir Bourouh =

France international rugby league footballer

Personal information
- Full name: Amir Bourouh
- Born: 5 January 2001 (age 25) Huddersfield, West Yorkshire, England
- Height: 5 ft 7 in (1.70 m)
- Weight: 13 st 12 lb (88 kg)

Playing information
- Position: Hooker
Club
Years	Team	Pld	T	G	FG	P
2019–21	Wigan Warriors	9	0	0	0	0
2021(loan)	→ Halifax Panthers	10	2	0	0	8
2022–24	Salford Red Devils	32	1	0	0	4
2022(loan)	→ London Broncos	1	0	0	0	0
2023(loan)	→ Barrow Raiders	2	1	0	0	4
2023(loan)	→ Swinton Lions	2	1	0	0	4
2024(loan)	→ Barrow Raiders	1	0	0	0	0
2025–26	Hull F.C.	50	5	0	0	20
2027–	Catalans Dragons	0	0	0	0	0
	Total	107	10	0	0	40
Representative
Years	Team	Pld	T	G	FG	P
2026–	France	3	1	0	0	4
- Source: As of 1 November 2026

Amir Bourouh (born 5 January 2001) is a France international rugby league footballer who plays as a hooker for the Catalans Dragons in the Super League.

He previously spent time on loan from Salford at the London Broncos in the RFL Championship.

== Background ==
Bourouh was born in Huddersfield, West Yorkshire, England, but considers neighbouring Halifax as his hometown.

He is of Algerian and French heritage.

== Career ==
=== Wigan Warriors ===
In 2019 he made his Super League début for Wigan against Salford.

=== Halifax ===
On 28 January 2021, it was reported that he had joined Halifax in the RFL Championship for a season-long loan.

=== Salford Red Devils ===
On 19 August 2021, it was reported that he had signed for Salford in the Super League

=== Barrow Raiders (loan) ===
On 21 June 2024 it was reported that he had signed for Barrow Raiders in the RFL Championship on short-term loan.

=== Hull F.C. ===
On 24 June 2024 it was reported that he had signed for Hull F.C. in the Super League on a three-year deal.

=== Catalans Dragons ===
On 15 August 2026 it was reported that he had signed for the Catalans Dragons in the Super League on a two-year deal.

=== International ===
On 1 October 2026 he was named in the 2026 France World Cup squad

He made his France international début in the 78-4 World Cup defeat to Samoa on 16 October 2026.
