= Latrell Siegwalt =

France international rugby league footballer

Personal information
- Born: 7 May 2001 (age 25) Wagga Wagga, New South Wales, Australia
- Height: 182 cm (6 ft 0 in)
- Weight: 86 kg (13 st 8 lb)

Playing information
- Position: Centre
Club
Years	Team	Pld	T	G	FG	P
2026–	South Sydney	8	2	28	0	64
Representative
Years	Team	Pld	T	G	FG	P
2026–	France	2	0	0	0	0
- Source: As of 22 November 2026

Latrell Siegwalt (born 7 May 2001) is a France international rugby league footballer who plays as a centre for the South Sydney Rabbitohs in the National Rugby League.

== Background ==
Siegwalt was born in Wagga Wagga, New South Wales, and is of Indigenous Australian and French descent, through his paternal grandfather.

He played his junior rugby league for the Turvey Park Wanderers and attended Mount Austin High School before being signed by the Canterbury-Bankstown Bulldogs.

== Playing career ==
=== Early career ===
In 2017, Siegwalt represented the NSW Koori under-16 side in their 16–14 win over Queensland Murri. In 2018, he played for the Riverina Bulls in the under-18 Laurie Daley Cup, playing in their Grand Final loss to the Newcastle Knights. In 2019, he played two SG Ball Cup games for the Canterbury-Bankstown Bulldogs.

In 2024, after several seasons playing for Turvey Park, the Southcity Bulls and Gundagai Tigers, Siegwalt joined the Redcliffe Dolphins in the Queensland Cup after impressing at the 2023 Koori Knockout.

In 2025, Siegwalt moved to the Souths Logan Magpies and underwent pre-season training with the Brisbane Broncos.

On 11 September 2025, Siegwalt signed with the South Sydney Rabbitohs on a two-year contract.

=== 2026 ===
In Round 10 of the 2026 NRL season, Siegwalt made his NRL debut for the Rabbitohs, starting at centre and kicking six goals in a 36–12 win over the Cronulla-Sutherland Sharks.

On 1 October, Siegwalt was named in France's World Cup squad. On 16 October, he made his international debut for France in their 78–4 loss to Samoa.
