= Roméo Tropis =

France international rugby league footballer

Romeo Tropis
Personal information
- Full name: Roméo Tropis
- Born: 8 May 2005 (age 21) Toulouse, Occitania, France
- Height: 6 ft 1 in (1.85 m)
- Weight: 14 st 2 lb (90 kg)

Playing information
- Position: Centre
Club
Years	Team	Pld	T	G	FG	P
2025–	Toulouse Olympique	27	14	0	0	56
Representative
Years	Team	Pld	T	G	FG	P
2025–	France	3	0	0	0	0
- Source: As of 2 November 2026

Roméo Tropis (born 8 May 2005) is a French professional rugby league footballer who plays as a centre for Toulouse Olympique in the Super League and France at international level.

== Background ==
Tropis was born in Toulouse, Occitania, France.

He played his junior rugby league with Ayguesvives XIII, in Haute-Garonne before joining the Toulouse Olympique academy.

== Career ==
=== Domestic ===
Tropis made his professional debut in March 2025 against the Bradford Bulls at Stade Ernest-Wallon.

He won the Championship Grand Final in October 2025, featuring in their narrow victory over the York Knights at the York Community Stadium.

=== International ===
Tropis was selected by Maxime Greseque for the French national team and made his debut on February 22 2025 against Morocco at the Parc des Sports in Avignon in a 34–10 victory.

In September 2026, Laurent Frayssinous includes him in an extended squad of forty players preparing for the 2026 World Cup.

On 1 October 2026 he was named in the France squad for the 2026 Rugby League World Cup.
