= Tony Sukkar (rugby league) =

Lebanon international rugby league footballer (born 2004)

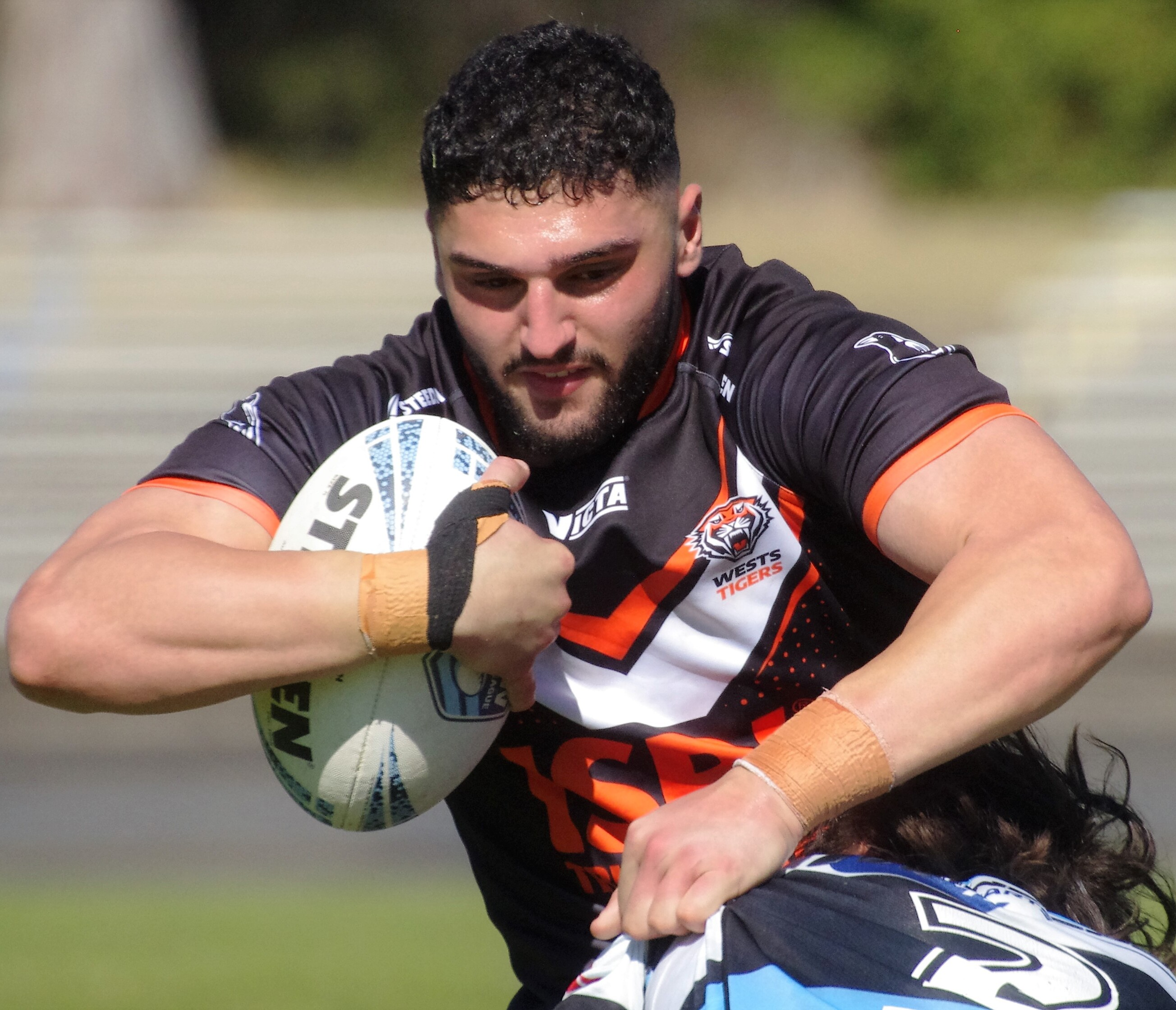

Personal information
- Full name: Tanous Sukkar
- Born: 25 May 2004 (age 22) Randwick, New South Wales, Australia
- Height: 186 cm (6 ft 1 in)
- Weight: 104 kg (16 st 5 lb)

Playing information
- Position: Second-row, Prop
Club
Years	Team	Pld	T	G	FG	P
2024–	Wests Tigers	25	2	0	0	8
Representative
Years	Team	Pld	T	G	FG	P
2026–	Lebanon	3	1	0	0	4
- Source: As of 22 November 2026

Tony Sukkar (born 25 May 2004) is a Lebanon international rugby league footballer who plays as a second-row forward or prop for the Wests Tigers in the NRL.

== Background ==
He is completing a double degree in law and applied finance at Macquarie University.

== Career ==
=== Early career ===
Sukkar began his career playing for the Strathfield Raiders, Concord-Burwood Wolves and Enfield Federals, before being signed by the Wests Tigers to play for their feeder club Balmain in Harold Matthews as a 15 year old.

Sukkar was a Balmain Tigers junior, coming through the Wests Tigers junior system. He was named captain of the Tigers SG Ball squad in 2023.

=== Wests Tigers ===
In round 27 of the 2024 NRL season, Sukkar made his first grade debut for the Wests Tigers against the Parramatta Eels at Campbelltown Stadium in a 60–26 loss. This game was the highly publicised Spoon Bowl match between the two clubs with the loser receiving the Wooden Spoon in 2024.

Sukkar made his second NRL appearances off the bench against the Brisbane Broncos, in a 46–24 loss at Suncorp Stadium. Sukkar re-signed with the Wests Tigers until the end of 2026.

Sukkar was limited to just nine games for the Wests Tigers in the 2026 NRL season as the club finished 15th on the table.

=== Representative ===
He made his Lebanon international début in the 2026 Rugby League World Cup 42-18 defeat to Papua New Guinea on 17 October 2026.
