= Lambert Belmas =

France international rugby league footballer

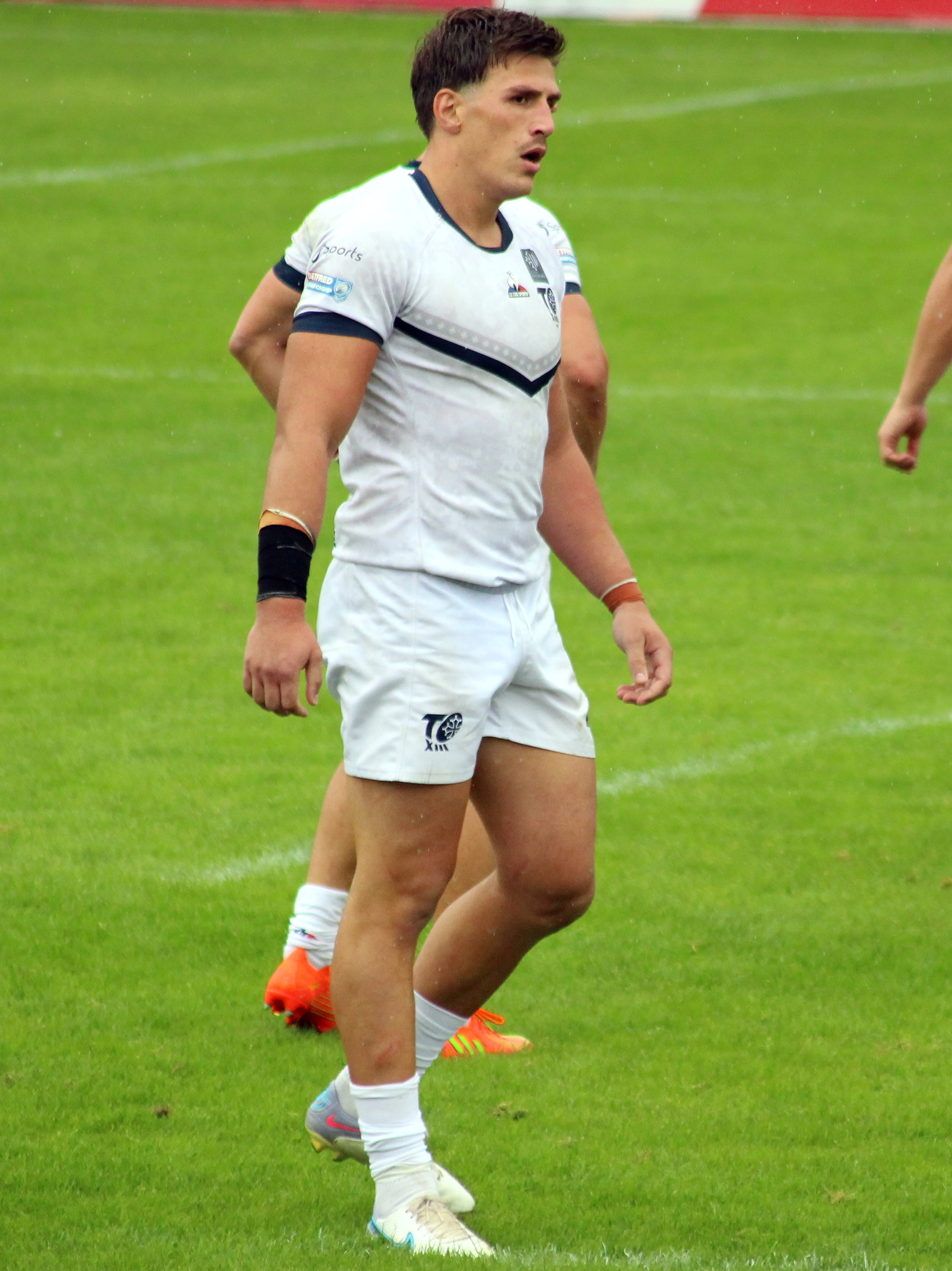

Personal information
- Full name: Lambert Belmas
- Born: 11 August 1997 (age 29) Carcassonne, Languedoc-Roussillon, France
- Height: 6 ft 2 in (1.88 m)
- Weight: 15 st 10 lb (100 kg)

Playing information
- Position: Prop
Club
Years	Team	Pld	T	G	FG	P
2016–17	Saint-Esteve	28	2	0	0	8
2017–21	Catalans Dragons	18	0	0	0	0
2017(loan)	→ Saint-Esteve	0	0	0	0	0
2021	FC Lézignan XIII	0	0	0	0	0
2022–	Toulouse Olympique	12	1	0	0	4
	Total	58	3	0	0	12
Representative
Years	Team	Pld	T	G	FG	P
2018–	France	10	0	0	0	0
2019–	France 9s	2	1	0	0	4
- Source: As of 1 November 2026

Lambert Belmas (born 11 August 1997) is a French professional rugby league footballer who plays as a prop for Toulouse Olympique in the Super League and France at international level.

He previously played for the Catalans Dragons and FC Lézignan XIII. Belmas has spent time on loan at Saint-Esteve in the Elite One Championship.

== Background ==
Belmas was born in Carcassonne, France.

== Career ==
In 2017 he made his Super League début for Catalans against the Huddersfield Giants.

On 20 Jul 2021 it was confirmed that Lambert had left Catalans after the expiration of his contract

In July 2021 Lezignan announced that they had signed Bélmas.

Belmas signed for Toulouse ahead of the 2022 Super League season, but snapped his achilles heel two days later. Toulouse committed to honouring his contract and helping his recovery from what could be a career ending injury. In June 2022 it was announced that Belmas had signed a two-year deal with Toulouse. On 15 October 2023, Belmas played in Toulouse Olympique's upset loss in the Million Pound Game against the London Broncos.

== International career ==
He was selected in the France 9s squad for the 2019 Rugby League World Cup 9s.
