= Salesi Foketi =

Tonga international rugby league footballer (born 2004)

Salesi Mafile’o Foketi
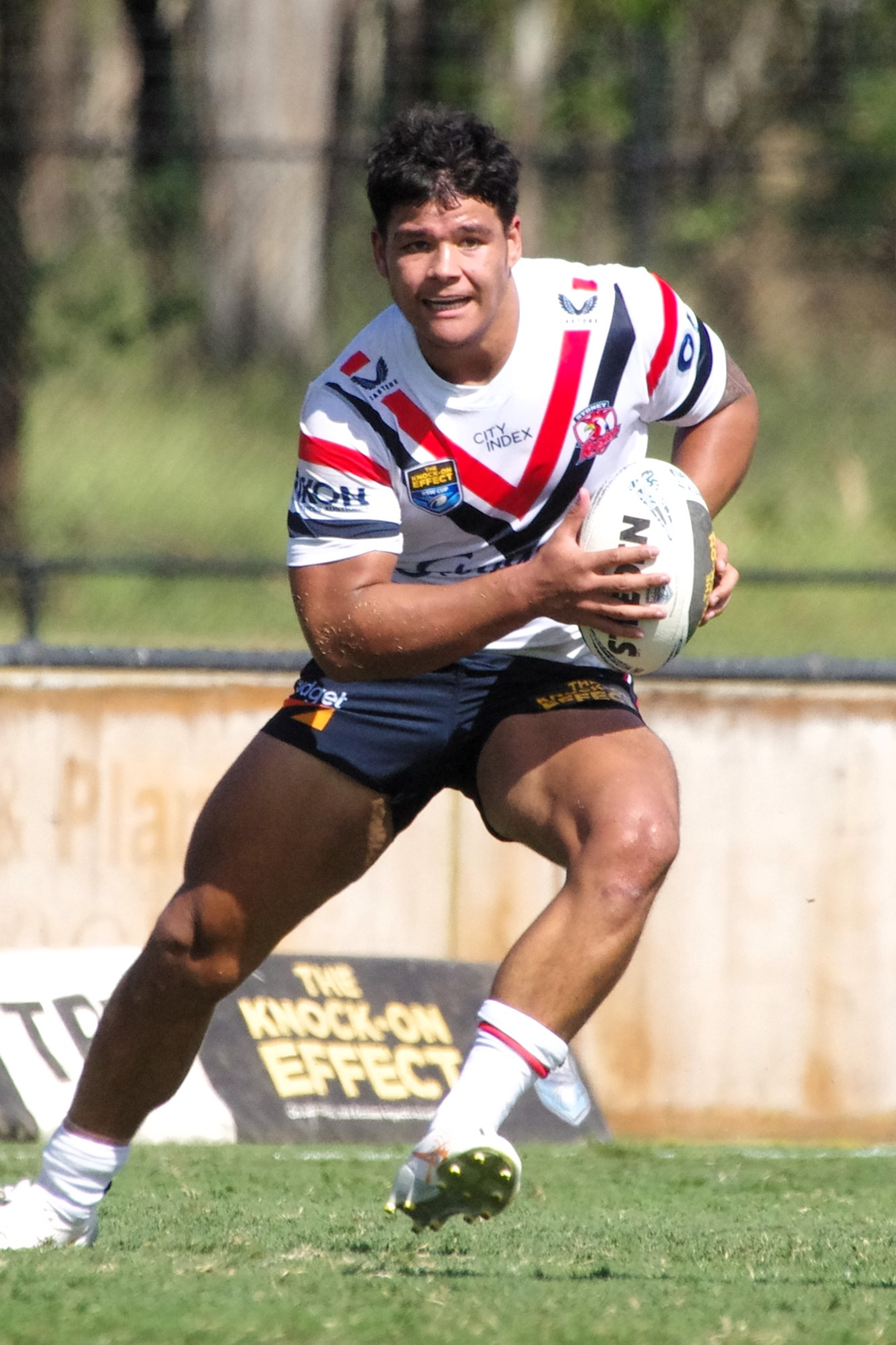

Personal information
- Full name: Salesi Mafile’o Foketi
- Born: 11 April 2004 (age 22) Auckland, New Zealand
- Height: 185 cm (6 ft 1 in)
- Weight: 97 kg (15 st 4 lb)

Playing information
- Position: Second-row, Lock, Prop, Hooker
Club
Years	Team	Pld	T	G	FG	P
2025–	Sydney Roosters	45	4	0	0	16
Representative
Years	Team	Pld	T	G	FG	P
2026–	Tonga	4	0	0	0	0
- Source: As of 20 November 2026

Salesi Mafile’o Foketi (born 11 April 2004) is a Tonga international rugby league footballer who plays as a lock and second-row for the Sydney Roosters in the National Rugby League.

He won the 2026 NRL Grand Final with the Roosters.

== Career ==
Foketi grew up in South Auckland. He attended St Paul's College, Auckland, helping the college to win 2021 Auckland Championship. He signed with the Sydney Roosters as a 17 year old, playing for the club in Harold Matthews, SG Ball and Jersey Flegg competitions.

=== 2025 ===
Foketi made his first grade debut in round 1 of the 2025 NRL season against the Brisbane Broncos off the interchange bench. In March he was sin-binned for a high tackle. Foketi played 19 games for the Sydney Roosters in the 2025 NRL season as the club finished 8th on the table and qualified for the finals.

=== 2026 ===
Foketi played 26 matches for the Sydney Roosters in the 2026 NRL season including the clubs 2026 NRL Grand Final victory over Newcastle.

He made his Tonga international début in the 2026 Rugby League World Cup 12–30 win over England on 17 October 2026.

== Statistics ==
Year	Team	Games	Tries	Pts
2025	Sydney Roosters	19	1	4
2026	Sydney Roosters	25	3	12
2027	Sydney Roosters			
	Totals	45	4	16
