= Alrix Da Costa =

France international rugby league footballer

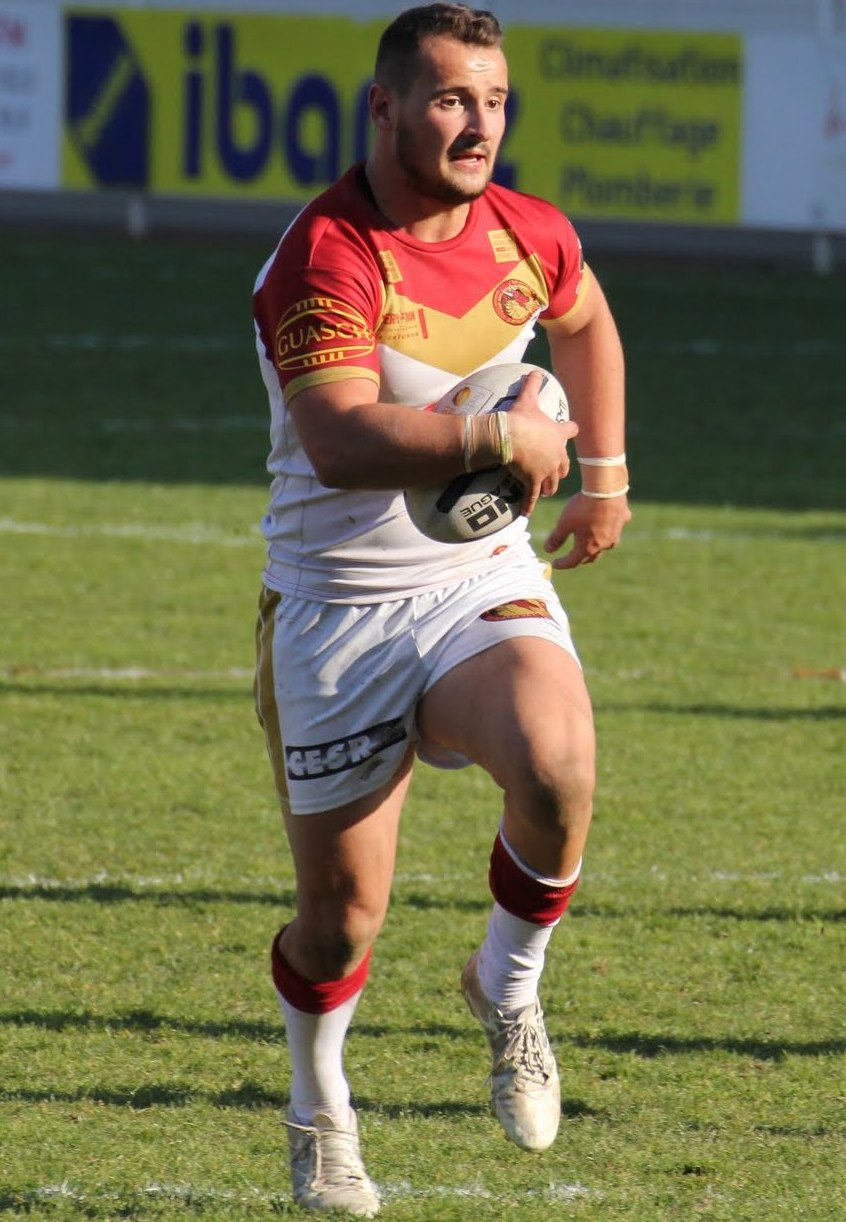

Personal information
- Born: 2 October 1997 (age 29) Foix, Ariège, Occitania, France
- Height: 5 ft 9 in (1.76 m)
- Weight: 13 st 8 lb (86 kg)

Playing information
- Position: Hooker
Club
Years	Team	Pld	T	G	FG	P
2016–26	Catalans Dragons	163	11	0	0	44
2016(loan)	→ Saint-Esteve	10	0	0	0	0
2027–	Hull FC	0	0	0	0	0
	Total	173	11	0	0	44
Representative
Years	Team	Pld	T	G	FG	P
2016–	France	11	2	0	0	8
2019–	France 9s	3	1	0	0	4
- Source: As of 1 November 2026

Alrix Da Costa (born 2 October 1997) is a French professional rugby league footballer who plays as a hooker for Hull FC in the Super League and France at international level.

Da Costa has spent time on loan Saint-Esteve in the Elite One Championship.

== Background ==
Da Costa was born in Foix, France.

== Club career ==
=== Catalans Dragons ===
Da Costa came through the junior ranks at Catalans and represented France at junior level. He made his Super League debut in the victory at St Helens on 14 April 2016. Da Costa missed Catalans 2021 Super League Grand Final loss to St Helens RFC due to injury, however he was an integral member of the team which won the League Leaders Shield that season. Da Costa was limited to only ten matches with Catalans in the 2023 Super League season and missed their 2023 Super League Grand Final loss against Wigan.

=== Hull FC ===
On 20 June 2026, it was reported that Da Costa would be joining Hull FC for the 2027 Super League season.

== International career ==
On 22 October 2016, Da Costa made his international debut for France in their end of year test match against England in Avignon.

He was selected in France 9s squad for the 2019 Rugby League World Cup 9s.
