= Guillermo Aispuro-Bichet =

France rugby league footballer (born 2005)

Personal information
- Full name: Guillermo Aispuro-Bichet
- Born: 12 July 2005 (age 21) France
- Height: 6 ft 1 in (1.86 m)
- Weight: 14 st 2 lb (90 kg)

Playing information
- Position: Fullback, Centre
Club
Years	Team	Pld	T	G	FG	P
2024–	Catalans Dragons	39	8	89	0	210
Representative
Years	Team	Pld	T	G	FG	P
2023–	France	7	5	3	0	26
- Source: As of 1 November 2026

Guillermo Aispuro-Bichet (born 12 July 2005) is a French professional rugby league footballer who plays as a fullback for the Catalans Dragons in the Super League and France at international level.

== Career ==
In 2024, he made his Catalans debut in the Super League against Castleford Tigers.
