= France national rugby league team =

Represents France in international rugby league

France

Team information
- Nicknames: Les Bleus; Les Tricolores; The Chanticleers (for the Anglophone media)
- Governing body: Fédération Française de Rugby à XIII
- Region: Europe
- Head coach: Laurent Frayssinous
- Captain: Benjamin Garcia
- Most caps: Puig Aubert (46)
- Top try-scorer: Raymond Contrastin (25)
- Top point-scorer: Puig Aubert (361)
- IRL ranking: 11th

Uniforms
First colours	Second colours

Team results
- First international
- England 32–21 France (Paris, France; 15 April 1934)
- Biggest win
- Serbia 0–120 France (Beirut, Lebanon; 22 October 2003)
- Biggest defeat
- England 84–4 France (Leigh, England; 24 October 2015)
- World Cup
- Appearances: 16 (first time in 1954)
- Best result: (silver) Runners-up (1954; 1968)

The France national rugby league team represents France in international rugby league matches. They are referred to as les Chanticleers or less commonly as les Tricolores. The team is run under the auspices of the Fédération Française de Rugby à XIII.

The French rugby league team first played in 1934 on a tour of England. They have taken part in all World Cups, 16 in total, with the first being held in 1954 in France. They have never won the title but finished runners-up in both 1954 and 1968. These are often considered the glory years of French rugby league as from the 1950s to the 1970s the team were strong and regularly beat Australia, New Zealand and Great Britain. Since those days, les Chanticleers have not done as well with their nadir occurring at the 1995 World Cup when they failed to win a single match.

In 2006, the Perpignan based team Catalans Dragons entered Super League, and have since produced a number of top-class French players. Recent successes of the French national team include reaching the quarter-finals of the 2000 and 2013 Rugby League World Cups, and participating in the 2009 Rugby League Four Nations. At the most recent World Cup in 2022, France failed to qualify for the quarter-finals after being eliminated at the group stage.

Currently, France are ranked eighth in the world. In Europe alone they are ranked second, ahead of Lebanon, Ireland, Scotland, Wales and Italy, but behind their main rival, England.

== History ==
=== 1930s ===
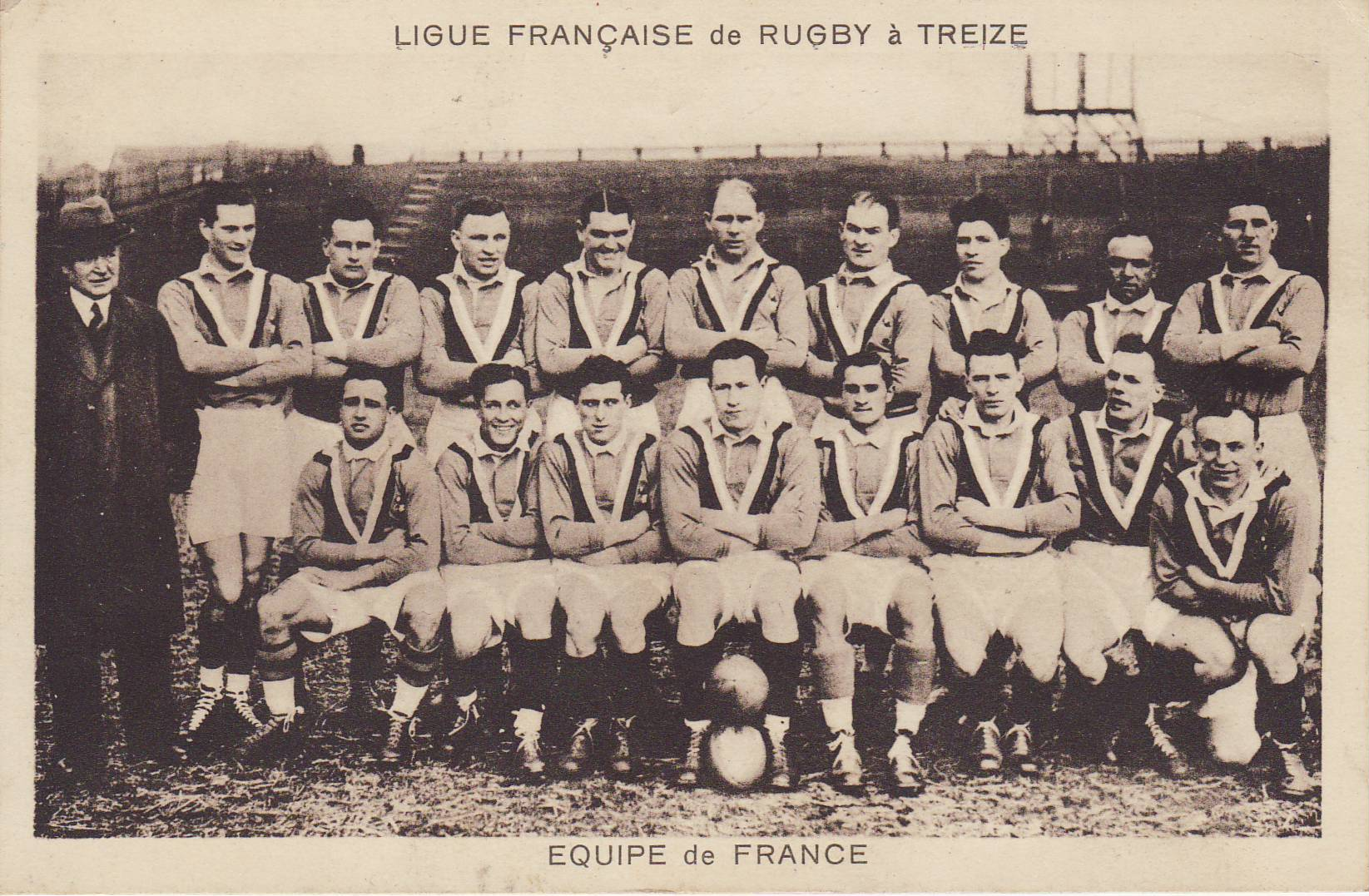
The 1934 squad, captained by Jean Gallia (front row, fourth from left).

On New Year's Eve 1933, England and Australia played in Paris – the first game of rugby league football in France. The match was one-sided, with Australia winning 63-13 in front of a crowd of about 5,000, but the seed was sown. French rugby union players, disgruntled that France had been suspended from the Five Nations Championship, formed the "Ligue Francaise de Rugby à XIII" on 6 April 1934. Jean Galia, a former rugby union international and champion boxer, led France on a six-match tour of England in 1934 and they recorded their first win in Kingston upon Hull. The national team's first game was in Paris on 15 April 1934, losing 21-32 to England in front of a crowd of 20,000. By 1939, the French League had 225 clubs and the national side won the 1938–39 European Rugby League Championship where they became the first French team in any sport to beat England at home.

=== 1940s ===
The game of rugby league suffered in France during the Second World War, after the Vichy government under the right-wing agenda of Marshal Petain, outlawed the sport. Some players and officials of the sport were punished (not reinstated in the French rugby union), whilst the total assets of the rugby league and its clubs were handed over to the union. After the war the game was re-established and the French became one of rugby league's major powers, competing in the Rugby League World Cup and in major international series against Great Britain, Australia and New Zealand despite continuing persecution. The sport was unable to call itself rugby until 1989, being called "jeu à XIII" (the game [played] in 13), which was an expression coined by Jean Gallia). In 1949, they became the first French sporting team to win at Wembley Stadium.

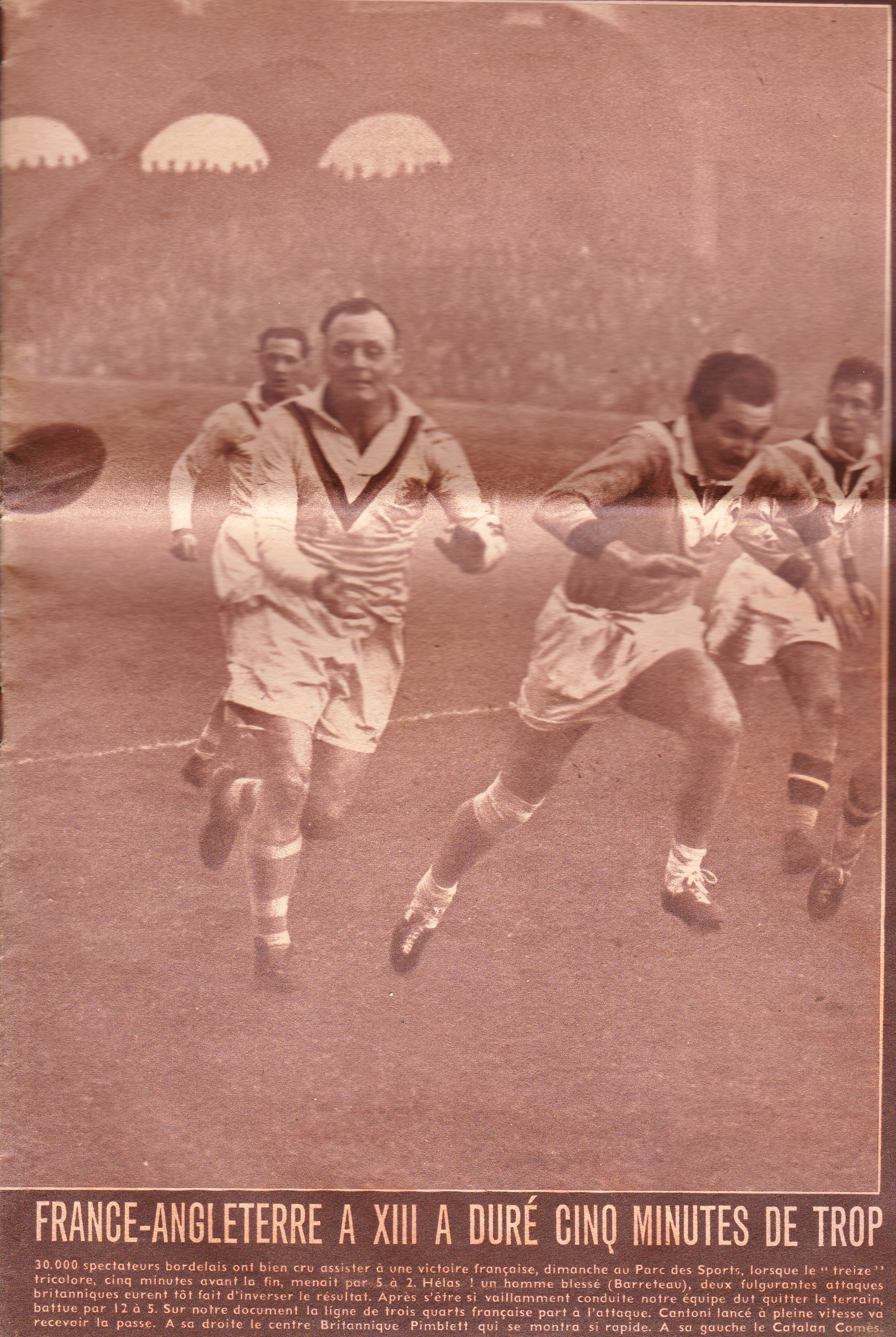
"The match between France and Great Britain lasted excessively for five minutes" Miroir print" n°130 29 November 1948

=== 1950s ===
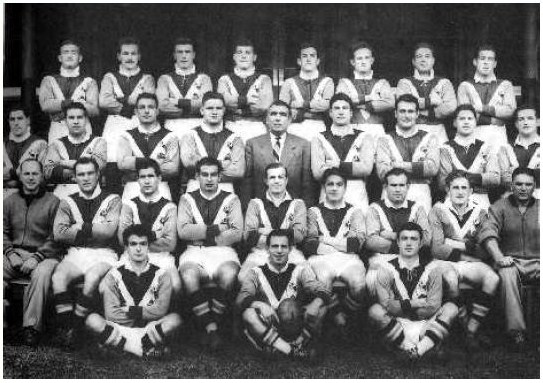
1951 team

In 1951 France embarked on their first ever tour of Australasia, coached by Robert Samatan and led by the legendary chain-smoking fullback, Puig Aubert. Their flamboyant style of unorthodox attacking rugby attracted huge crowds. When the two nations met for the first Test, the match became the first "all ticket" international to be staged at the Sydney Cricket Ground, and attracted a crowd of over 60,000. On Saturday 30 June 1951, Australia secured a hard-fought second Test victory over France in Brisbane by 23 points to 11. The third Test took place at Sydney Cricket Ground three weeks later before a crowd of 67,009. Late tries from Duncan Hall and Brian Davies could not prevent the Kangaroos from suffering an embarrassing 35-14 defeat. France played 28 matches during the three-month tour, winning 21 matches, drawing twice and losing just five times.

In November 1951, France met "Other Nationalities" in an International Championship match at the Boulevard, Hull which became known as the "Battle of the Boulevard". Other Nationalities won 17-14 but the match centred on the behaviour of Edouard Ponsinet, who was involved in most of the violence that happened at the game. The Other Nationalities were down to eleven players at one stage, with Arthur Clues being the most serious casualty, hospitalised with head injuries. Eventually Ponsinet was sent off, ten minutes from time after breaking the nose of Jeff Burke. Despite this defeat France went on to retain the title with home victories over England and Wales.

In the 1954 World Cup, which was the first of either rugby code and was instigated by France, Les Tricolores defeated both Australia and New Zealand, and drew with Great Britain to reach the final. This was the closest they went to getting their hands on the World Cup, going down narrowly, 16-12, to Great Britain in the final in Parc des Princes. France donated the original World Cup trophy, but they have never won it.

France repeated the success of their 1951 tour in 1955, with even bigger attendances greeting the team. Puig Aubert had broken his arm just prior to the touring party leaving and did not tour. Despite this, France played splendidly to win the second test in Brisbane (in a spectacular game 29-28 before 45,000 fans at the Brisbane Cricket Ground) and the third test at the SCG. The 1951 and 1955 French sides that toured Australia are still regarded as two of the strongest sides ever to tour that country.

In the 1957 World Cup, held in Australia, the winner was decided by finishing top of the table with no final being played. France finished last, winning one match against New Zealand. History was made when the returning French and British squads visited South Africa and played a series of exhibition matches in Benoni, Durban and East London, all of which were won by the British.

=== 1960s ===
In the 1960 Rugby League World Cup France failed to win a match, and finished last for the second consecutive time.

On Sunday 8 December 1963, France defeated the Australians in the first Test of a three Test series during the Kangaroo tour of Europe. The match was held in Bordeaux.

France regained strength as the decade went on - defeating Australia quite comprehensively in the 1967-1968 series played in France, winning two games and drawing one.

The French reached the final of the 1968 Rugby League World Cup, the last time they have achieved that feat. They beat both Great Britain and New Zealand to qualify, but lost to Australia in Sydney, and so finished runners-up again.

=== 1970s ===
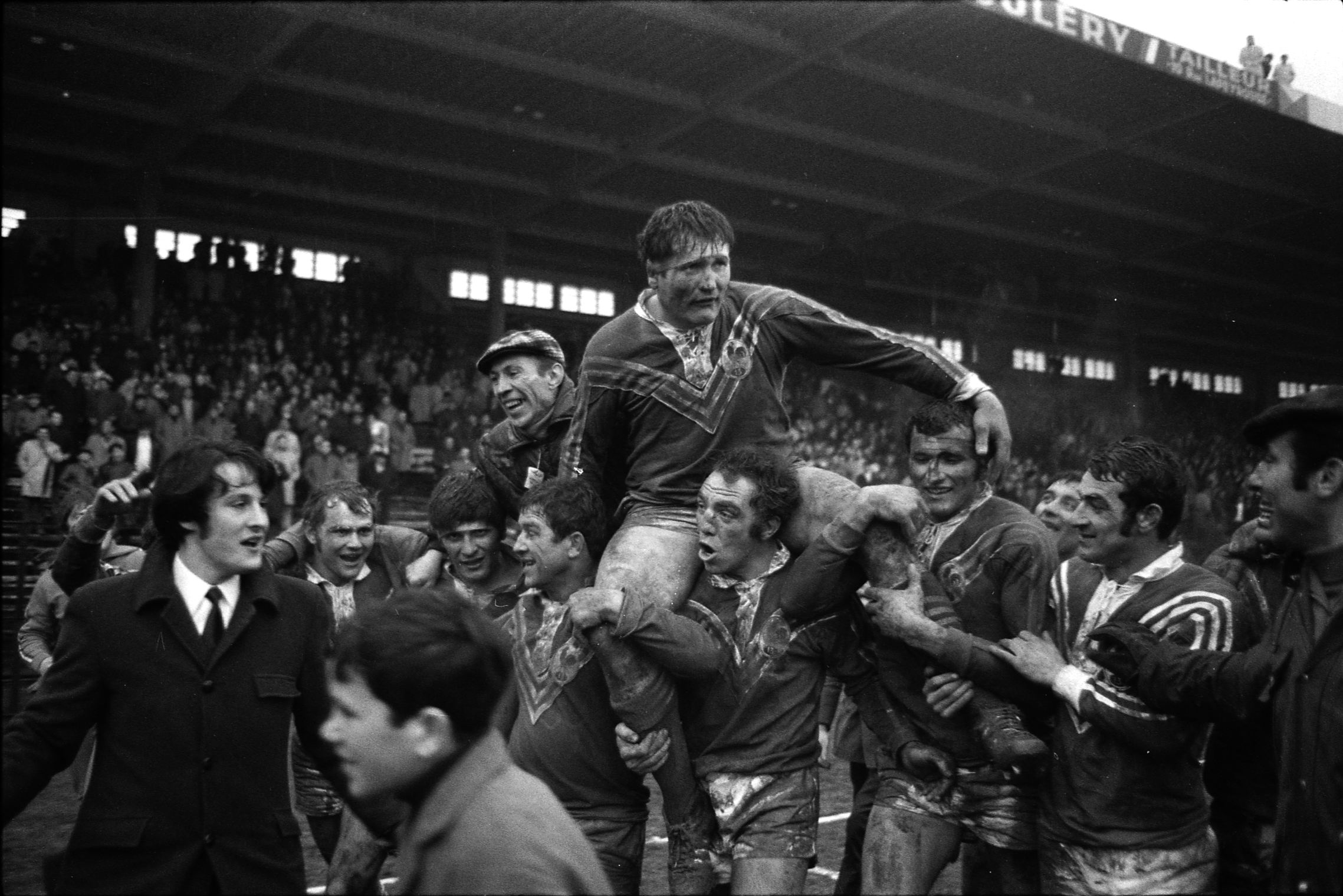
The French captain, Georges Ailleres, carried on his teammates' shoulders after a win against England in 1970.

France managed one victory in the 1970 Rugby League World Cup, a narrow win over Australia, who went on to win the Cup in the final. In 1972 France hosted the sixth World Cup and again only got the one win, in the opening match against New Zealand. The trend of underperformance in the World Cup continued for the French in the expanded 1975 tournament, in which they recorded a lone win over Wales and a draw against New Zealand. Two years later in the 1977 World Cup they did not win a single match. But then on the 1978 Kangaroo tour, France beat Australia 13-10 and 11-10. This was Australia's last defeat in an international series or competition until the 2005 Tri-Nations.

=== 1980s ===
Rugby league in France went through a riotous period at the beginning of the 1980s. The turbulent period was steadied by the influence of French Rugby League guru Jean-François Bouchet, however poor results followed. From 1985 to 1987 the team were beaten by New Zealand in Perpignan, drew with Great Britain in Avignon and were thrashed 52-0 in Carcassonne by Australia. Away from home they suffered a large defeat against Great Britain in Leeds. The team reached a low point when they were forced to forfeit away World Cup games against Australia, New Zealand and Papua New Guinea in the 1985-88 edition because of lack of funds. Their only World Cup win was against Papua New Guinea in front of 3,500 people in Carcassonne.

=== 1990s ===
In 1990, a Great Britain team including Shaun Edwards, Garry Schofield, Martin Offiah and Denis Betts were embarrassed by a 25-18 loss, France's first victory on English soil for 23 years and their last win over Great Britain/England. The team then met Papua New Guinea on Sunday 30 June 1991 in Rabaul, where they were beaten 28-24. On Sunday 7 July 1991, the two sides met again for a World Cup encounter at Danny Leahy Oval, Goroka. The heat and humidity caused France all kinds of problems, but Les Tricolores squeezed home 20-18.

On Sunday 27 October 1991, the first ever Test match involving the Soviet Union took place at the Stade Georges Lyvet, Villeurbanne, near Lyon, France. The Bears were beaten 26-6 by France. The Papua New Guinea national team wound up their 1991 tour of Europe with a World Cup rated Test match against France, which was played on Sunday 24 November at the Stade Albert Domec, Carcassonne. France defeated their visitors 28-14. In the 1995 World Cup France had to play the Samoans three days after taking a physical pounding from the Welsh in Cardiff.

John Kear was briefly in charge of Les Tricolores in 1997.

France took on Italy at the Parc des Sports, Avignon in November 1999. France needed a draw to win the Mediterranean Cup. The Italians, registered a memorable 14-10 victory, which handed the cup to the Lebanon.

=== 2000s ===
France traveled to Pretoria for a match against South Africa on Saturday 3 November 2001. The French were too good for a young and inexperienced South African side. They scored four tries in each half, and won 44-6 after leading 24-0 at half-time.

In 2002, France lost to Lebanon 36–6 in front of 9,713 spectators at Tripoli in the Mediterranean Cup final.

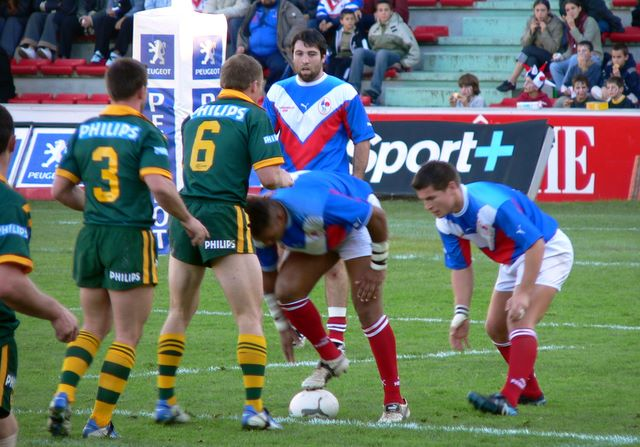
France playing against Australia in Toulouse.

In 2004 the French returned to form with a narrow 20-24 loss to New Zealand and a losing but creditable performance against Australia. In 2005, Les Tricolores played Australia again in Perpignan, suffering a 12-44 defeat. Unlike their last match against Australia, this game was played under normal rules and is considered a regular test match. This was their best performance in an official test match against Australia since 1990.

The French team lining up before their match against New Zealand in the 2009 Four Nations tournament.

Papua New Guinea toured France in the winter of 2007, with France winning both matches. After the tour, a match in Paris was scheduled against New Zealand, who were on their way home from a 3-0 test series defeat by Great Britain. A last minute try secured a 22-14 New Zealand win in front of a decent crowd despite Paris rail strikes. France participated in the 2008 World Cup after being granted automatic qualification. They were drawn in Group B with Scotland and Fiji. Winning only one game and losing two, France finished the tournament in last place.

France participated in the first 2009 Four Nations tournament against England, New Zealand and Australia. The following year, the tournament was held in Australia and New Zealand, with France's place being taken by a Pacific qualifier.

=== 2010s ===
With the Four Nations returning to Europe in 2011, France needed to qualify by winning the 2010 European Cup, but failed to do so, with Wales qualifying instead. In 2011 the English team, rather than playing their annual test against France, instead arranged the inaugural 2011 International Origin match.

France participated in the 2013 Rugby League World Cup and hosted some games. They reached the quarter-finals where they were knocked out by England.

In 2014, France played in the 2014 European Cup. They came second in the tournament on points difference, by only 3 points, finishing behind Scotland therefore failing to qualify for the 2016 Four Nations.

In May 2015, France were set to take on South Africa However, the Africans had to withdraw due to the concerns of national contingencies. Therefore, France announced they'd play Serbia in Saint-Esteve on the 22 May. The French, who were labelled as France 'A' due to not being a full-strength side, went on to hammer the Serbs by 68 points to 8.

In October 2015, France played in the 2015 European Cup. During the tournament in November, after already confirming before the tournament's details were announced, France took on England in Leigh. The match was a warm-up game for England before their end-of-year test-series against New Zealand. The French were hammered by a record 80-point margin.

In August 2016 Richard Agar, who began coaching France at the 2013 World Cup, left the national team. It is believed he left because new Fédération Française de Rugby à XIII president Marc Palanques wants a Frenchman to coach the national team. Aurelien Cologni, who had a temporary spell from 2011-2012, became the new coach.

At the 2017 Rugby League World Cup, France were placed in a strong group, pitted against the likes of England, Lebanon and defending champions Australia. France got off to the worst possible start, suffering a shock loss to Lebanon 29-18 in Canberra. The following two games did not get any better for the French as they were thumped 52-6 by Australia and then suffered another big defeat to their old foes England 36-6 in Perth. They thus failed to move beyond the group stage and were eliminated from the World Cup.

=== 2020s ===
As the winner of the 2018 Rugby League European Championship, France Qualified for the 2021 Rugby League World Cup, their 16th appearance in the competition. In the lead-up to the tournament, France hosted Tonga for a warm-up match, losing 12–48. The match heralded the introduction of the Tas Baitieri Trophy that both teams will contest each time they meet in future matches. It is named after former Australian player Tas Baitieri who became coach of the French national team in the 1980s. France won its opening game in the 2021 Rugby League World Cup 34–12 against Greece. Unfortunately, they lost their next two games (going down to England 18–42 and then eventual finalists Samoa 4–62). As a result, France did not finish in the top two of their group and therefore failed to proceed to the quarter-finals of the tournament.

== Identity ==
=== Jersey ===
Traditionally, France wears a blue jersey usually complemented by a red and white chevron on the chest, white shorts and red socks, with the team being nicknamed Les Tricolores. The uniforms feature the Gallic rooster embroidered on the chest, much like their union counterpart. The use of the rooster as badge influenced Eastern Suburbs RLFC, which had uniforms similar to France, to use the rooster as symbol since 1967, being known as Sydney Roosters. Sometimes, France also wears a white jersey in case a colour clash arises.

=== Kit suppliers and sponsors ===
Period	Manufacturers	Sponsors
1969-1975	Le Coq Sportif	none
1975-1981	Adidas	none
1982-1988	O'Neills	none
1985-86	Nike (Note: (worn only in the 1985 World Cup Tests against Great Britain and New Zealand))	
1989-1990	Halbro	Jiffi Condoms
1990-1991	Valpro	none
1991-1992	MSport	Cassegrain Wines
1993-1994	Power League	Peugeot
1995-1996	Power League	Coverland
1997-1999	Puma	none
2000-2003	Puma	Enterasys Networks
2004	Puma	Sport+
2005-2006	Canterbury	Sport+
2007-2008	Canterbury	none
2009-2010	Rugby Approved	Mutuelles du Rempart
2011-2013	Puma	Mutuelles du Rempart
2014-2016	Erreà	Mutuelles du Rempart
2016	Erreà	Groupe Nicollin
2017	Erreà	Classic Bet
2018–present	Erreà	Mister Marcel

== Coaching history ==
Manager	France career	P	W	D	L	Win %
(France) Jean Galia	1937-1949					
(France) Robert Samatan	1951-1954					
(France) René Duffort (France) Jean Duhau	1954-1960	7	2	1	4	28.6
(France) Jep Lacoste	1968	4	2	0	2	50.0
(France) Puig Aubert	1975					
(France) Antoine Jimenez	1975	1	0	0	1	0.0
(France) Yves Bégou	1977	3	0	0	3	0.0
(France) Roger Garrigue	1978-1981	2	0	0	2	0.0
(France) Michel Maïque	1982-1983	1	0	0	1	0.0
(France) Louis Bonnery	1984	2	0	0	2	0.0
(Australia) Tas Baitieri	1984-1987	2	0	1	1	0.0
(France) Jacques Jorda	1987-1991	5	1	0	4	20.0
(France) Michel Mazaré	199?-1994	2	0	0	2	0.0
(France) Jean-Christophe Vergeynst	1991-1994	3	0	0	3	0.0
(France) Ivan Grésèque	1994-1996	14	1	3	10	7.1
(England) John Kear	1997-1998	5	4	1	0	80.0
(France) Patrick Pedrazzani	1998-1999	5	2	0	3	40.0
(France) Gilles Dumas	1999-2004	24	10	0	14	41.7
(Australia) Mick Aldous	2004-2005	7	3	0	4	42.9
(Australia) John Monie	2005-2009	7	1	0	6	14.3
(England) Bobbie Goulding	2009-2011	11	4	0	7	36.4
(France) Aurelien Cologni	2011-2012	4	2	0	2	50.0
(England) Richard Agar	2013-2015	9	4	0	5	44.4
(France) Renaud Guigue	2015	1	1	0	0	100.0
(France) Aurélien Cologni	2016-2021	9	4	0	5	44.4
(France) Laurent Frayssinous	2021–present	0	0	0	0	—

== Players ==
=== Current squad ===
Squad selected for the 2026 Men's Rugby League World Cup.

J#	Player	Age	Position(s)	Debut	Caps	Tries	Goals	Drop Goals	Points	Club	Club Matches	Other Reps
–	Guillermo Aispuro-Bichet	21	Centre	2023	4	3	3	0	18	Catalans Dragons	39	
–	Lambert Belmas	29	Prop	2018	9	1	0	0	4	Toulouse Olympique	48	
–	Amir Bourouh	25	Hooker	—	0	0	0	0	0	Hull F.C.	88	
–	Julian Bousquet	35	Prop	2011	17	2	0	0	8	Catalans Dragons	293	
–	Tiaki Chan	26	Prop, Second-row	2023	4	1	0	0	4	Toulouse Olympique	70	
–	Mathieu Cozza	26	Prop, Second-row	2023	2	0	0	0	0	Huddersfield Giants	48	
–	Alrix Da Costa	28	Hooker	2016	13	2	0	0	8	Catalans Dragons	149	
–	Leo Darrelatour	26	Wing, Centre	2025	1	1	0	0	4	Catalans Dragons	21	
–	Jordan Dezaria	29	Prop	2019	9	1	0	0	4	Hull Kingston Rovers	99	
–	Jowasa Drodrolagi	31	Second-row	2022	1	0	0	0	0	AS Carcassonne	0	Fiji
–	Théo Fages	32	Scrum-half, Stand-off	2013	18	5	0	0	20	Baroudeurs de Pia XIII	248	
–	Benjamin Garcia	33	Loose forward, Second-row	2013	18	3	0	0	12	Catalans Dragons	258	
–	Louis Grossemy	23	Second-row	2025	1	0	0	0	0	Toulouse Olympique	7	
–	Mathieu Jussaume	27	Centre	2019	2	1	0	0	4	Toulouse Olympique	36	
–	Thomas Lacans	25	Stand-off, Scrum-half	2024	1	0	0	0	0	Toulouse Olympique	21	
–	Benjamin Laguerre	25	Wing, Fullback	—	0	0	0	0	0	Toulouse Olympique	26	
–	Arthur Mourgue	27	Fullback	2019	10	2	20	0	48	Hull Kingston Rovers	130	
–	Romain Navarrete	32	Prop	2016	13	1	0	0	4	Catalans Dragons	195	
–	Arthur Romano	29	Centre, Wing	2019	10	3	0	0	12	Hull F.C.	99	
–	César Rougé	23	Scrum-half, Stand-off	2022	8	4	6	0	28	Toulouse Olympique	65	
–	Latrell Siegwalt	25	Stand-off, Fullback	—	0	0	0	0	0	South Sydney Rabbitohs	8	
–	Roméo Tropis	21	Centre	2025	1	0	0	0	0	Toulouse Olympique	15	
–	Fouad Yaha	30	Wing	2017	10	4	0	0	16	Racing Club Albi XIII	155	

Notes:

- Bold numbers in the club matches column indicate that the player has played all his games for his current club.
- The tally of club matches include those played in the Super League or National Rugby League.
- The shading in the club column indicates the player was selected from a second-tier club. The three clubs - Albi, Carcassonne and Pia, all play in the Super XIII competition held in France.
- Jowasa Drodrolagi previously made one appearance for Fiji. This was in the 2022 World Cup. Drodrolagi also played one game for the Fijian Prime Minister's XIII in 2019.

== Competitive record ==
=== Overall ===
Below are the France international XIII results up until 12 May 2025.

Opponent	Played	Won	Drawn	Lost	% Won	For	Aga	Diff
Australia	61	14	2	45	22.95%	547	1476	–929
(United Kingdom) (Australia) British Empire XIII	2	1	0	1	50%	23	25	–2
Canada	1	1	0	0	100%	72	32	+40
(Australia) (New Zealand) Dominion XIII	2	1	0	1	100%	11	11	0
England	53	7	2	44	13.21%	540	1454	–914
England Knights	7	1	0	6	14.29%	109	208	–99
Fiji	2	0	0	2	0%	18	62	–44
Georgia	1	1	0	0	100%	60	0	+60
Great Britain	75	19	4	52	25.33%	796	1762	–966
Greece	1	1	0	0	100%	34	12	+22
Ireland	9	7	1	1	77.78%	295	172	+123
Italy	1	0	0	1	0%	10	14	–4
Jamaica	1	1	0	0	100%	186	10	+176
Kenya	2	2	0	0	100%	186	10	+176
Lebanon	4	1	0	3	25%	80	115	–35
Morocco	3	3	0	0	100%	186	18	+168
New Zealand	56	16	5	35	28.57%	592	1065	–473
Māori	4	2	0	2	50%	60	52	+8
Other Nationalities	6	2	0	4	33.33%	77	99	–22
Papua New Guinea	14	9	1	4	64.29%	281	249	+32
Rest of the World	1	1	0	0	100%	21	20	+1
Russia	8	8	0	0	100%	371	54	+317
Samoa	5	1	0	4	20%	58	188	–130
Scotland	11	9	0	2	81.82%	326	198	+128
Serbia	4	4	0	0	100%	284	22	+262
South Africa	2	2	0	0	100%	86	23	+63
Tonga	2	1	0	1	50%	38	56	–18
United States	2	1	0	1	50%	49	22	+27
Ukraine	1	1	0	0	100%	74	8	+66
Wales	43	25	0	18	58.14%	713	643	+70
Total	384	142	15	227	36.98%	6,183	8,080	–1,897

=== World Cup ===
World Cup Record
Year	Round	Position	Pld	Win	Draw	Loss
(France) 1954	Second place	2/4	4	2	1	1
(Australia) 1957	Fourth place	4/4	3	1	0	2
(United Kingdom) 1960	Fourth place	4/4	3	0	0	3
(Australia) (New Zealand) 1968	Second place	2/4	4	2	0	2
(United Kingdom) 1970	Third place	3/4	3	1	0	2
(France) 1972	Third place	3/4	3	1	0	2
(Australia) (France) (New Zealand) (United Kingdom) 1975	Fifth place	5/5	8	1	1	6
(Australia) (New Zealand) 1977	Fourth place	4/4	3	0	0	3
1985–88	Fifth place	5/5	5	1	1	3
1989–92	Fourth place	4/5	8	2	0	6
(England) 1995	Group stage	9/10	2	0	0	2
(England) (Ireland) (France) (Scotland) (Wales) 2000	Quarter-finals	5/16	4	2	0	2
(Australia) 2008	Group stage	10/10	2	1	0	1
(England) (Wales) 2013	Quarter-finals	6/14	4	1	0	3
(Australia) (New Zealand) (Papua New Guinea) 2017	Group stage	12/14	3	0	0	3
(England) 2021	Group stage	10/16	3	1	0	2
(Australia) (New Zealand) (Papua New Guinea) 2026	Group stage		3	0	0	3
Total	0 Titles	17/17	65	16	3	46

=== Four Nations ===
Four Nations Record
Year	Round	Position	Pld	Win	Draw	Loss
(England) (France) 2009	Fourth place	4/4	3	0	3	0
(Australia) (New Zealand) 2010	Not Invited					
(England) (Wales) 2011	Did not qualify					
(Australia) (New Zealand) 2014	Not Invited					
(England) 2016	Did not qualify					
Total	0 Titles	1/5	3	0	3	0

=== European Championship ===
European Championship Record
Year	Place	Position	Pld	Win	Draw	Loss
1935	Second place	2/3	2	1	1	0
1935–36	Third place	3/3	2	0	0	2
1936–37	Third place	3/3	2	0	0	2
1938	Third place	3/3	2	0	0	2
1938-39	Champions	1/3	2	2	0	0
1945–46	Second place	2/3	2	1	1	0
1946–47	Third place	2/3	4	1	0	3
1947-48	Second place	2/3	4	2	0	2
1948–49	Champions	2/3	4	3	0	1
1949–50	Fourth place	4/4	3	1	0	2
1950–51	Champions	1/4	3	2	0	1
1951–52	Champions	1/4	3	2	0	1
1952–53	Fourth place	4/4	3	0	0	3
1953–54	Third place	3/4	3	1	0	2
1955–56	Second place	2/3	2	1	0	1
1969–70	Second place	2/3	4	2	1	0
1975	Third place	3/3	2	0	0	2
1977	Champions	1/3	2	2	0	0
1978	Third place	3/3	2	0	0	2
1979	Second place	2/3	2	1	0	1
1980	Second place	2/3	2	1	0	1
1981	Champions	1/3	2	2	0	0
1935	Third place	3/3	2	0	0	2
1996	Third place	3/3	2	0	0	2
2003	Second place	2/6	3	1	2	0
2004	Group stage	3/6	2	1	1	0
2005	Champions	1/6	3	3	0	0
2009	Did not participate					
2010	Second place	2/4	3	2	1	0
2012	Did not participate					
2014	Second place	2/4	3	2	1	0
2015	Second place	2/4	3	2	1	0
2018	Champions	1/4	3	3	0	0
Total	8 Titles	7/9	20	14	6	0

== Honours ==
Major:
World Cup:

- Runners-up (2): 1954, 1968

Regional:
European Championship:

- Winners (8): 1938-39, 1948–49, 1950–51, 1951–52, 1977, 1981, 2005, 2011, 2018
- Runners-up (11): 1935, 1945–46, 1947–48, 1955–56, 1969–70, 1979, 1980, 2003, 2010, 2014, 2015

== Attendance records ==
=== Highest all-time attendances ===
Attendance	Opposing team	Venue	Tournament
67,745	Australia	Sydney Cricket Ground, Sydney	1955 French tour – 1st Test
67,009	Australia	Sydney Cricket Ground, Sydney	1951 French tour – 3rd Test
62,458	Australia	Sydney Cricket Ground, Sydney	1955 French tour – 3rd Test
60,160	Australia	Sydney Cricket Ground, Sydney	1951 French tour – 1st Test
54,290	Australia	Sydney Cricket Ground, Sydney	1968 Rugby League World Cup Final

=== Highest attendances per opponent ===
Attendance	Opposing team	Venue	Tournament
67,745	Australia	Sydney Cricket Ground, Sydney	1955 French tour – 1st Test
50,077	Great Britain	Sydney Cricket Ground, Sydney	1957 Rugby League World Cup
32,000	England	Stade Vélodrome, Marseille	1947–48 European Rugby League Championship
30,431	New Zealand	Stade Vélodrome, Marseille	1965 Kiwis tour – 1st Test
30,000	Wales	Stade Vélodrome, Marseille	1948–49 European Rugby League Championship
20,000	United States	Parc des Princes, Paris	1955 American rugby league tour of France
20,000	England Knights	Stade Vélodrome, Marseille	1956 France vs England A
16,000	Papua New Guinea	Lloyd Robson Oval, Port Moresby	1981 French tour of Australasia
14,552	Ireland	Parc des Sports, Avignon	2010 European Cup
13,174	Samoa	Western Sydney Stadium, Parramatta	2026 Rugby League World Cup
10,313	Scotland	Stade Gilbert Brutus, Perpignan	2011 Autumn series
10,288	Tonga	Stade Albert Domec, Carcassonne	2000 Rugby League World Cup
10,000	Russia	Luzhniki Stadium, Moscow	Russia vs France 2003
9,713	Lebanon	International Olympic Stadium, Tripoli	2002 Mediterranean Cup
9,213	Fiji	Wollongong Showground, Wollongong	2008 Rugby League World Cup
7,969	South Africa	Stade Municipal, Toulouse	2000 Rugby League World Cup
6,500	Jamaica	Stade Gilbert Brutus, Perpignan	2017 France vs Jamaica
4,182	Greece	Doncaster Community Stadium, Doncaster	2021 Rugby League World Cup
1,800	Morocco	Stade Jean-Laffon, Perpignan	1999 Mediterranean Cup
1,257	Ukraine	Stade Albert Domec, Carcassonne	2024 France vs Ukraine
1,000	Italy	Parc des Sports, Avignon	1999 Mediterranean Cup
514	Canada	Stade Saputo, Montreal	Canada vs France 1995
400	Georgia	Vake Stadium, Tbilisi	2005 European Nations Cup

=== Highest attendances per opponent in France ===
Attendance	Opposing team	Venue	Tournament
37,471	Great Britain	Stade Municipal, Toulouse	1954 Rugby League World Cup
32,000	England	Stade Vélodrome, Marseille	1947–48 European Rugby League Championship
30,431	New Zealand	Stade Vélodrome, Marseille	1965 Kiwis Tour – 1st Test
30,000	Wales	Stade Vélodrome, Marseille	1948–49 European Rugby League Championship
23,419	Australia	Stade Municipal, Bordeaux	1952–53 Kangaroo tour – 2nd Test
20,000	United States	Parc des Princes, Paris	1955 American Rugby League Tour of France
20,000	England Knights	Stade Vélodrome, Marseille	1956 France vs England A
14,552	Ireland	Parc des Sports, Avignon	2010 European Cup
11,576	Samoa	Stade Gilbert Brutus, Perpignan	2013 Rugby League World Cup
10,313	Scotland	Stade Gilbert Brutus, Perpignan	2011 Autumn series
10,288	Tonga	Stade Albert Domec, Carcassonne	2000 Rugby League World Cup
7,969	South Africa	Stade Municipal, Toulouse	2000 Rugby League World Cup
7,248	Papua New Guinea	Parc des Sports, Avignon	2007 Papua New Guinea Kumuls tour
6,500	Jamaica	Stade Gilbert Brutus, Perpignan	2017 France vs Jamaica
2,000	Russia	Stade Georges Lyvet, Lyon	1991 France vs Russia
1,800	Morocco	Stade Jean-Laffon, Perpignan	1999 Mediterranean Cup
1,257	Ukraine	Stade Albert Domec, Carcassonne	2024 France vs Ukraine
1,000	Lebanon	Stade des Minimes, Toulouse	1999 Mediterranean Cup
1,000	Italy	Parc des Sports, Avignon	1999 Mediterranean Cup

== IRL Rankings ==
IRL Men's World Rankings
Official rankings as of August 2026
Rank	Change	Team	Pts %
1	Steady	Australia	100
2	Steady	New Zealand	82
3	Steady	Tonga	70
4	Steady	Samoa	56
5	Steady	England	54
6	Steady	Papua New Guinea	47
7	Steady	Fiji	34
8	▲1	Cook Islands	24
9	▲2	Netherlands	23
10	▲2	Ukraine	21
11	▼3	France	21
12	▼2	Serbia	20
13	Steady	Wales	18
14	Steady	Ireland	17
15	Steady	Greece	14
16	Steady	Malta	14
17	▲12	Canada	13
18	▼1	Italy	11
19	▼1	Jamaica	9
20	▲7	Scotland	8
21	▲1	United States	8
22	▼3	Poland	7
23	▼3	Lebanon	7
24	▼1	Germany	7
25	▼1	Czech Republic	6
26	▼5	Norway	6
27	▼2	Chile	5
28	▲2	Philippines	5
29	▼1	South Africa	4
30	Steady	Brazil	3
31	Steady	Morocco	3
32	▲1	Argentina	3
33	▲2	Ghana	2
34	▲2	Kenya	2
35	▼1	Montenegro	2
36	▲1	Nigeria	2
37	▼5	North Macedonia	1
38	Steady	Albania	1
39	Steady	Turkey	1
40	Steady	Bulgaria	1
41	Steady	Cameroon	0
42	Steady	Japan	0
43	Steady	Spain	0
44	Steady	Colombia	0
45	Steady	Russia	0
46	Steady	El Salvador	0
47	Steady	Bosnia and Herzegovina	0
48	Steady	Hong Kong	0
49	Steady	Solomon Islands	0
50	Steady	Vanuatu	0
51	Steady	Hungary	0
52	Steady	Latvia	0
53	Steady	Denmark	0
54	Steady	Belgium	0
55	Steady	Estonia	0
56	Steady	Sweden	0
57	Steady	Niue	0
Complete rankings at www.internationalrugbyleague.com

== See also ==
- Rugby league in France
- Super XIII
- Lord Derby Cup
- European Nations Cup
- Union Treiziste Catalane
- Federation Shield
