= César Rougé =

France international rugby league footballer

Personal information
- Full name: César Rougé
- Born: 3 October 2002 (age 24) Carcassonne, Aude, Occitania, France
- Height: 5 ft 11 in (1.81 m)
- Weight: 13 st 10 lb (87 kg)

Playing information
- Position: Scrum-half, Hooker, Stand-off, Fullback
Club
Years	Team	Pld	T	G	FG	P
2021–25	Catalans Dragons	49	8	4	0	24
2022(loan)	→ Whitehaven	2	0	2	0	4
2023(loan)	→ Hull KR	1	0	0	0	0
2026–	Toulouse Olympique	17	2	19	0	46
	Total	69	10	25	0	74
Representative
Years	Team	Pld	T	G	FG	P
2022–	France	9	4	6	0	28
- Source: As of 1 November 2026

César Rougé (born 3 October 2002) is a French professional rugby league footballer who plays as a scrum-half, hooker or stand-off for Toulouse Olympique in the Super League and France at international level.

== Playing career ==
=== Catalans Dragons ===
In 2021 he made his Catalans debut in the Super League against St Helens.

=== Toulouse Olympique ===
On 17 January 2026 it was reported that he had signed for Toulouse Olympique in the Super League on a one-year deal.

=== International ===
On 1 October 2026 he was named in the 2026 France World Cup squad
