= Leo Darrelatour =

France international rugby league footballer

Léo Darrélatour
Personal information
- Full name: Léo Darrélatour
- Born: 8 September 2000 (age 26) France
- Height: 5 ft 11 in (1.81 m)
- Weight: 12 st 8 lb (80 kg)

Playing information
- Position: Wing
Club
Years	Team	Pld	T	G	FG	P
2025–	Catalans Dragons	22	15	0	0	60
Representative
Years	Team	Pld	T	G	FG	P
2025–	France	3	1	0	0	4
- As of 1 November 2026

Léo Darrélatour (born 8 September 2000) is a French professional rugby league footballer who plays as a winger for the Catalans Dragons in the Super League and France at international level.

== Career ==
=== Catalans Dragons ===
Darrélatour made his debut in round 7 of the 2025 Super League season against the Huddersfield Giants , scoring a try.

=== International ===
He made his debut and scored a try for France in the 36-0 2026 Rugby League World Cup qualifier win over Jamaica on 25 October 2025
