= Lebanon national rugby league team =

Representative side of Lebanon in rugby league football

Lebanon

Team information
- Nickname: The Cedars
- Governing body: Lebanese Rugby League Federation
- Region: Europe
- Head coach: Michael Cheika
- Captain: Alex Twal
- Most caps: Christopher Salem Jamie Clark (19)
- Top try-scorer: Christopher Salem (15)
- Top point-scorer: Hazem El Masri (196)
- Home stadium: International Olympic Stadium; Beirut Municipal Stadium
- IRL ranking: 23rd

Uniforms
First colours	Second colours

Team results
- First international
- Japan 28 – 52 Lebanon (Tokyo, Japan; 1998)
- Biggest win
- Morocco 0 – 104 Lebanon (Carcassonne, France; 1999)
- Biggest defeat
- Russia 80 – 0 Lebanon (Moscow, Russia; 28 September 2008)
- World Cup
- Appearances: 3 (first time in 2000)
- Best result: Quarterfinals (2017)

The Lebanon national rugby league team (Arabic: المنتخب اللبناني للرجبي ليغ, French: Équipe du Liban de rugby à XIII) represents Lebanon in rugby league football. Nicknamed "the Cedars" after the Lebanese cedar tree, the team was formed by Lebanese Australians in 1997 and have been administered by the Lebanese Rugby League Federation since 2002.

The Cedars have competed at three Rugby League World Cups (2000, 2017, 2021) achieving their best result as quarter-finalists at the latter two. The team's World Cup history has been defined by close losses and unfavourable draws. They were eliminated in 2000 following a 24–22 loss to Wales and a 22–22 draw with the Cook Islands, and they were knocked out in 2017 by a 24–22 loss to a much stronger Tongan team. Lebanon's two unsuccessful qualifying attempts for the 2008 and 2013 tournaments were both decided by points difference after drawing with Ireland in 2006 and again in 2007, and Italy in 2011.

The current head coach is Australian Michael Cheika, who was appointed in October 2020.

== History ==
A team consisting of Lebanese Australians represented Lebanon at the 1997 Rugby League World Sevens.

=== 2000 World Cup ===
Lebanon was placed in the Mediterranean Pool for qualification to the 2000 World Cup. In their first game they defeated Italy 36–16, and then defeated Morocco 104–0. In this match, captain Hazem El Masri scored a total of 48 points, the highest number of points ever scored by one player in an international match. To qualify they had to beat the Pacific Rim Pool winners, the USA. They won 62–8 and secured the final place in the World Cup. Following the match the team were warned about their conduct after a car-park fight which resulted in American winger Tony Fabri being taken to hospital.

The Cedars were in a pool with favourites New Zealand, Wales and Cook Islands. The team were well beaten against New Zealand in Gloucester. Head coach John Elias said after the game that his team were simply out of their depth. However Lebanon did much better in the match against Wales. It wasn't until Wales had scored four tries that Lebanon had finally got on the score board with a Michael Coorey try in the 35th minute. In the second half Lebanon performed much better, but two late Hassan Saleh tries left Lebanon losing 24–22. By far the easiest game on paper was the match against the Cook Islands. With just five minutes remaining though, The Cedars found themselves 22–10 down, before Hazem El Masri scored a second try and centre Charles Baynie scored one too in last minute to seal a 22–22 draw for Lebanon. This point was enough to keep them off bottom place in the group, but they had not done enough to earn a place in the quarter-finals.

In 2002, Lebanon beat France 36–6 in front of 16,713 spectators at Tripoli to clinch the Mediterranean Cup for a second time. In 2003 played host to another Mediterranean Cup with Lebanon beating France again in final, albeit this was a much closer match at 26–18 with Wissam El Masri only fully securing the win in the last minute. In the final Mediterranean Cup in 2004, Lebanon made it three victories in a row. Just like last year's cup, they easily beat Morocco and Serbia to face the French in the final again. France trailed 30–8 at half time but in the second half it was a much tighter affair with Toufiq Nicolas and a third Ahmed Al Masri try finally sealing a 42–14 victory for Lebanon despite a late consolation try for France. It is also worth noting that a young Thomas Bosc featured in that match for France. He would then go on to play in the 2007 Challenge Cup Final.

=== 2008 World Cup qualifying ===
Despite wanting to host another Mediterranean Cup in 2005, Lebanon did not play another international until November 2006. With a place in the 2008 World Cup up for grabs, Lebanon were drawn in a group with Russia and Ireland. In Darren Maroon's first match as head coach, Lebanon beat Russia 22–8 in a tight and tense match at the New River Stadium in North London. Ireland however had already thrashed Russia beforehand and so Lebanon needed to beat Ireland in Dublin to go top of the table. Centre Daniel Chiha crossed over the line after 13 minutes, but the conversion was missed. John Koborsi then extended the lead for Lebanon and the team went into half time 0–10 up. However within 6 minutes after half-time, Ireland had scored two tries and they were now in front. A little later Chris Salem then intercepted a ball near his own line and ran the whole length of the pitch to score a spectacular try. This lead didn't last though and in the last minutes of the game Ireland scored a try to end the game 18–18. In 2007 the World Cup qualifying matches continued. In October the team travelled to Moscow and put nine-tries past Russia to win 0–48. Because Ireland had a significantly better points difference then Lebanon, The Cedars needed a win to qualify, a draw or a narrow defeat was simply not good enough. At the end of the Russia match, despite the easy victory, Darren Maroon said that the team must make big improvements if they were to beat the Irish. Due to the volatile situation in Lebanon, The Cedars had to play their "home tie" in Dewsbury, England. A George Ndaira try in the first half meant that Lebanon went into half time on the wrong end of a 12–4 scoreline. Chris Salem immediately scored a try after the interval though and Lebanon were back in the game. In the 63rd minute prop Charlie Nohra was sent off, leaving Lebanon with 12 men and a huge upward struggle. Frank Samia scored a converted try near the end of the match and so Lebanon were ahead for the first time in the match. In the last minute the two points were taken away as a high-tackle gave Ireland a penalty which they scored to end the game 16–16. Lebanon had not done enough to secure a place in the World Cup.

But because they had finished, they went into a repechage match with three other teams, Wales, USA and Samoa. They faced Wales first and won that match in Widnes, England. In took a long time for Lebanon too actually take the lead for the first time in the match, but in the second half Lebanon were much stronger than Wales and eventually posted nine tries, including three by Chris Salem, against Wales' five. This victory also meant that Lebanon had extended their unbeaten streak to 13 matches, and in doing so beating Australia's record of 12 unbeaten matches from 1999 to 2001. Samoa had beaten the US in the other match and so Lebanon and Samoa faced each other in Featherstone, England for the tenth and final place in the 2008 World Cup. Samoa had a lot of the possession during the match and were noticeably physically larger. Samoa went into half time with a 28–8 lead despite a George Ndaira try for Lebanon on the 18th minute and an Adnan Saleh try very near to half-time. Two more tries in the second half were not enough for Lebanon and they lost the match 16–38, scoring four tries but converting none of them.

=== 2013 World Cup Qualifying ===
Lebanon were drawn against Serbia, Italy and Russia in the qualifying group for the 2013 Rugby League World Cup, with the winners of the group progressing to the final tournament. Following comfortable victories over Serbia and Russia, Lebanon set up a winner-takes-all match against Italy in Belgrade on 29 October. The game finished in a draw with the score at 19–19, which meant that Italy qualified for the World Cup ahead of Lebanon based on points difference. This is the second time in a row that Lebanon have failed to qualify for the World Cup despite not losing a game in the qualifiers.

=== Return to the World Cup, player disputes (2015–19) ===
The Middle East-Africa region was allocated one slot for the 2017 Rugby League World Cup. The qualifying tournament was held in October 2015 in Pretoria as a two-match series between Lebanon and South Africa. Travis Robinson scored hat-tricks in both matches as Lebanon qualified comfortably with an aggregate score of 90–28.

The Cedars were coached by Brad Fittler and captained by Robbie Farah at the 2017 World Cup. Ivan Cleary was initially announced as head coach, but resigned after taking the head coach position at the Wests Tigers in April 2017. He was replaced by Fittler. Lebanon competed in Group A, defeating France 29–18 in a close match, losing 29–10 to England, and holding onto for a commendable 34–0 loss to tournament favourites Australia. Notably, Lebanon kept the score to 10–0 until the 50th minute and 22–0 until the 76th minute. In the quarter-final, Lebanon came close to upsetting Tonga, remaining within one try for most of the match, but ultimately lost 24–22. Lebanon's progression to the quarter-finals earned them automatic qualification for the next World Cup in 2021.

Lebanon's planned test match against Papua New Guinea in June 2018 was cancelled following reports of a player boycott. Chris Saab and Michael Hedwan notified the LRLF of the boycott, alleging that the team was underfunded and unsupported by the administration during the World Cup. Fittler, who had since been appointed head coach of the New South Wales State of Origin team, supported the boycott. The LRLF refuted all claims of economic mismanagement and also denied the existence of a squad-wide boycott. The LRLF cited a loss of sponsorship due to negative publicity as the reason for withdrawing from the match. Michael Maguire reportedly walked away from negotiations to coach the team during this period.

Rick Stone was appointed head coach ahead of the Cedars' June 2019 match against Fiji. The lead-up to the game was impacted by continued player unrest, with many members of the playing squad choosing to cover the LRLF's logo at training and during media appearances. Concerns about the state of the domestic competition in Lebanon, which could jeopardise the team's eligibility to compete at the next World Cup, was stated to be the motivating factor. The LRLF claimed that covering their logo constituted a criminal offence under Lebanese law. Although mediation ensured that no players concealed the logo during the match, in which Lebanon were outclassed by Fiji 58–14, misconduct charges for sixteen players were subsequently announced by the LRLF.

Lebanon's participation in the 2019 Rugby League World Cup 9s in October 2019 was allegedly in doubt due to reports that several high-profile players would withdraw from the tournament.

=== 2021 World Cup ===
Lebanon automatically qualified for the 2021 Rugby League World Cup in England having reached the quarter finals of the previous Rugby League World Cup. Michael Cheika was announced as head coach in October 2020.

At the 2021 Rugby League World Cup, the Cedars competed in Group C of the tournament. Two wins against Ireland and Jamaica and one loss against New Zealand booked Lebanon a quarter-final match against Australia. A 48-4 loss to Australia in the quarter-final stopped Lebanon from advancing to the semi-final. However, their run to the quarter-final also ensured the Cedars qualified for the next Rugby League World Cup.

== Current squad ==
Squad named on October 7 2026, to play against Papua New Guinea.

Name	Club
Jacob Kiraz	(Australia) Canterbury-Bankstown Bulldogs
Tony Francis	(Australia) Gold Coast Titans
Michael Gabreal	(Australia) Cronulla-Sutherland Sharks
Jordan Samrani	(Australia) Parramatta Eels
Jason Saab	(Australia) Manly Warringah Sea Eagles
Khaled Rajab	(Australia) Newtown Jets NSW Cup
Alex Conti	(Australia) Canterbury-Bankstown Bulldogs
Jaxson Rahme	(Australia) Wests Tigers
Yehya Ayache	(Australia) South Sydney Rabbitohs NSW Cup
James Roumanos	(France) Toulouse Olympique
Tony Sukkar	(Australia) Wests Tigers
Mikael Ibrahim	(Australia) South Sydney Rabbitohs Jersey Flegg Cup
Alex Twal	(Australia) Wests Tigers
Moustafa Dirani	(Australia) St Mary's Saints NSW Cup
Jalal Bazzaz	(Australia) St Georges Illawarra Dragons NSW Cup
Abbas Miski	(England) Wigan Warriors
Tupou Francis	(Australia) Brisbane Broncos
Khalil Rahme	(Australia) Newtown Jets NSW Cup
Joseph Nohra	(Australia) Paramatta Eels NSW Cup

== Competitive record ==
Lebanon has been participating in International fixtures since 1998 and has played 61 games since then to Round 1 of the 2016 World Cup group stage, at an average of three games per year. Most of Lebanon's games have been played as friendlies or as part of the Mediterranean Cup which has taken place sporadically from 1999, with Lebanon winning all 5 tournaments that have been held. The team remains mostly composed of players of Lebanese ancestry from Australia.

Lebanon have a 62.30% win record, holding impressive records against a number of more experienced teams such as France whom they hold an 80% win record from 5 games and a 75% win record against Italy whom they have played 9 times. Lebanon have played the 'big three' teams of Australia, New Zealand and England five times, losing each time.

Over the 28 years of Lebanon's existence, Lebanon has played 21 different countries, playing Italy the most with 9 matches between the two sides.

The following table underneath shows Lebanon's all-time rugby league results. They have been participating in International fixtures since 1998.

As of 22 October 2026

Country	Played	Won	Drawn	Lost	Win %	For	Against	Pts difference
Australia	2	0	0	2	0%	4	82	–78
Canada	1	0	0	1	0%	18	36	–18
Cook Islands	3	0	1	2	0%	66	80	–14
England	1	0	0	1	0%	10	29	–19
Fiji	4	2	0	2	50%	118	118	0
France†	5	4	0	1	80%	157	94	+63
Ireland	4	2	2	0	50%	106	64	+42
Italy	9	6	1	2	75%	243	115	+128
Jamaica	1	1	0	0	100%	74	12	+62
Japan	1	1	0	0	100%	52	28	+24
Malta	4	4	0	0	100%	124	44	+80
Morocco	6	6	0	0	100%	392	44	+348
New Zealand	2	0	0	2	0%	12	98	–86
Niue	1	1	0	0	100%	32	16	+16
Papua New Guinea	1	0	0	1	0%	18	42	–24
Russia	4	3	0	1	75%	102	88	+14
Samoa	1	0	0	1	0%	16	38	–22
Scotland	1	0	0	1	0%	10	22	–12
Serbia	4	4	0	0	100%	282	24	+258
South Africa	2	2	0	0	100%	90	28	+62
Tonga	2	0	0	2	0%	22	60	–48
United States	1	1	0	0	100%	62	8	+54
Wales	2	1	0	1	50%	72	50	+22
Total	61	38	5	18	62.3%	2.082	1,184	+898

†Includes matches played against the France Espoirs side.

=== World Cup Record ===
World Cup Record						
Year	Round	Position	Pld	Win	Draw	Loss
(France) 1954	did not enter					
(Australia) 1957	did not enter					
(United Kingdom) 1960	did not enter					
(Australia) (New Zealand) 1968	did not enter					
(United Kingdom) 1970	did not enter					
(France) 1972	did not enter					
(Australia) (France) (New Zealand) (United Kingdom) 1975	did not enter					
(Australia) (New Zealand) 1977	did not enter					
1985-88	did not enter					
1989-92	did not enter					
(England) 1995	did not enter					
(England) (France) (Ireland) (Scotland) (Wales) 2000	Group stage	14/16	3	0	1	2
(Australia) 2008	did not qualify					
(England) (Wales) 2013	did not qualify					
(Australia) (New Zealand) (Papua New Guinea) 2017	Quarter-finals	7/14	4	1	0	3
(England) 2021	Quarter-finals		4	2	0	2
(Australia) (Papua New Guinea) (New Zealand) 2026	Group Stage	5/10	3	1	0	2

=== World Cup 9's ===
World Cup 9's Record
Year	Round	Position	Pld	Win	Draw	Loss
(Australia) 2019	Pool stage		3	2	0	1

== IRL Rankings ==
IRL Men's World Rankings
Official rankings as of August 2026
Rank	Change	Team	Pts %
1	Steady	Australia	100
2	Steady	New Zealand	82
3	Steady	Tonga	70
4	Steady	Samoa	56
5	Steady	England	54
6	Steady	Papua New Guinea	47
7	Steady	Fiji	34
8	▲1	Cook Islands	24
9	▲2	Netherlands	23
10	▲2	Ukraine	21
11	▼3	France	21
12	▼2	Serbia	20
13	Steady	Wales	18
14	Steady	Ireland	17
15	Steady	Greece	14
16	Steady	Malta	14
17	▲12	Canada	13
18	▼1	Italy	11
19	▼1	Jamaica	9
20	▲7	Scotland	8
21	▲1	United States	8
22	▼3	Poland	7
23	▼3	Lebanon	7
24	▼1	Germany	7
25	▼1	Czech Republic	6
26	▼5	Norway	6
27	▼2	Chile	5
28	▲2	Philippines	5
29	▼1	South Africa	4
30	Steady	Brazil	3
31	Steady	Morocco	3
32	▲1	Argentina	3
33	▲2	Ghana	2
34	▲2	Kenya	2
35	▼1	Montenegro	2
36	▲1	Nigeria	2
37	▼5	North Macedonia	1
38	Steady	Albania	1
39	Steady	Turkey	1
40	Steady	Bulgaria	1
41	Steady	Cameroon	0
42	Steady	Japan	0
43	Steady	Spain	0
44	Steady	Colombia	0
45	Steady	Russia	0
46	Steady	El Salvador	0
47	Steady	Bosnia and Herzegovina	0
48	Steady	Hong Kong	0
49	Steady	Solomon Islands	0
50	Steady	Vanuatu	0
51	Steady	Hungary	0
52	Steady	Latvia	0
53	Steady	Denmark	0
54	Steady	Belgium	0
55	Steady	Estonia	0
56	Steady	Sweden	0
57	Steady	Niue	0
Complete rankings at www.internationalrugbyleague.com

== See also ==
- Rugby league in Lebanon
- Lebanon national rugby league team match results
