= 2021 Men's Rugby League World Cup =

- Number of teams: 16
- Host country: England
- Winner: Australia (12th title)
- Runner-up: Samoa
- Matches played: 31
- Attendance: 423,689 (13,667 per match)
- Points scored: 1721 (55.52 per match)
- Tries scored: 307 (9.9 per match)
- Top scorer: (Samoa) Stephen Crichton (73)
- Top try scorer: (Australia) Josh Addo-Carr (12 tries)

The 2021 Men's Rugby League World Cup was the 16th Rugby League World Cup, and one of three major tournaments of the 2021 Rugby League World Cup. The tournament was held in England from 15 October 2022 to 19 November 2022. It was originally due to be held between 23 October 2021 and 27 November 2021, but the COVID-19 pandemic and the subsequent withdrawals of Australia and New Zealand caused the tournament to be postponed. 16 teams competed in the tournament, an increase of two from the previous two tournaments and the first to feature 16 teams since the 2000 Rugby League World Cup.

For the first time, the Rugby League World Cup was run alongside the women's and wheelchair tournaments with all participants being paid the same, while all 61 matches in the three tournaments were broadcast live.

Australia beat Samoa 30–10 in the final to win the tournament for the third successive time, extending their record number of World Cup titles to twelve.

== Teams ==
=== Qualification ===
The eight quarter-finalists of the previous tournament in 2017 earned automatic qualification to the 2021 tournament. As such, the allocations were confirmed as 6 teams from Europe (excluding hosts), 6 from Asia-Pacific, 1 from Middle East-Africa, 1 from the Americas, and 1 from an inter-regional play-off. Qualification began on 16 June 2018, and concluded on 16 November 2019.

Team	Method of qualification	Date of qualification	Total times qualified	Last time qualified	Current consecutive appearances	Previous best performance
England	Hosts	27 October 2016	7 (Note: Competed as part of Great Britain in nine previous tournaments, finishing as champions on three occasions (1954, 1960, 1972). The squads largely consisted of English players, but also featured Welsh players in every tournament. Scotland (1954, 1968, 1977, 1989–92) and Ireland (1957) were represented by native-born players in some tournaments.)	2017	7	Runners-up (1975, 1995, 2017)
Fiji	2017 Group D winners	10 November 2017	6	2017	6	Semi-finals (2008, 2013, 2017)
Tonga	2017 Group B winners	11 November 2017	6	2017	6	Semi-finals (2017)
New Zealand	2017 Group B runners-up	11 November 2017	16	2017	16	Winners (2008)
Samoa	2017 Group B third place	11 November 2017	6	2017	6	Quarter-finals (2000, 2013, 2017)
Australia	2017 Group A winners	11 November 2017	16	2017	16	Winners (11 times)
Lebanon	2017 Group A third place	11 November 2017	3	2017	2	Quarter-finals (2017)
Papua New Guinea	2017 Group C winners	12 November 2017	8	2017	8	Quarter-finals (2000, 2017)
France	Europe second round winners	11 November 2018	16	2017	16	Runners-up (1954, 1968)
Wales	Europe second round runners-up	11 November 2018	6	2017	3	Semi-finals (1995, 2000)
Jamaica	Americas Championship winners	17 November 2018	1	–	1	–
Ireland	Europe third round Group A winners	9 November 2019	5	2017	5	Quarter-finals (2000, 2008)
Italy	Europe third round Group A runners-up	9 November 2019	3	2017	3	Group stage (2013, 2017)
Scotland	Europe third round Group B winners	9 November 2019	5	2017	5	Quarter-finals (2013)
Greece	Europe third round Group B runners-up	9 November 2019	1	–	1	–
Cook Islands	Inter-regional repechage winners	16 November 2019	3	2013	1	Group stage (2000, 2013)

=== Draw ===
The draw was originally scheduled to be finalised on 27 November 2019, exactly two years before the date of the tournament final, however, it was postponed until 16 January 2020. The draw was made at Buckingham Palace on 16 January 2020 and was streamed live on Facebook. Teams from pot 1 were drawn by Prince Harry, Duke of Sussex, pot 2 by Katherine Grainger, and pot 3 by Jason Robinson.

Seeded	Pot 1	Pot 2	Pot 3
England (A); Australia (B); New Zealand (C); Tonga (D)	Fiji; Lebanon; Papua New Guinea; Samoa	France; Jamaica; Scotland; Wales	Cook Islands; Greece; Ireland; Italy

The draw resulted in the following teams being drawn into the following groups. Each group had to have at least one team from the Pacific region. As such, Lebanon were not eligible to be drawn into Group A from pot 1.

Group A	Group B	Group C	Group D
England; Samoa; France; Greece	Australia; Fiji; Scotland; Italy	New Zealand; Lebanon; Jamaica; Ireland	Tonga; Papua New Guinea; Wales; Cook Islands

=== Squads ===
From September 2022, teams announced wider squads of up to 38 players, which were reduced to 24 before the beginning of the tournament.

== Venues ==
=== Stadium locations ===
Seventeen venues were used for the men's tournament.

Manchester		London	Newcastle	Leeds
Old Trafford		Emirates Stadium	St James' Park	Elland Road
Capacity: 74,994		Capacity: 60,260	Capacity: 52,405	Capacity: 37,890
Middlesbrough	* Venues in Greater Manchester † Venues in West Yorkshire			Coventry
Riverside Stadium	* Venues in Greater Manchester † Venues in West Yorkshire			Coventry Building Society Arena
Capacity: 34,742	* Venues in Greater Manchester † Venues in West Yorkshire			Capacity: 32,753
Sheffield	* Venues in Greater Manchester † Venues in West Yorkshire			Bolton
Bramall Lane	* Venues in Greater Manchester † Venues in West Yorkshire			University of Bolton Stadium
Capacity: 32,702	* Venues in Greater Manchester † Venues in West Yorkshire			Capacity: 28,723
Hull	* Venues in Greater Manchester † Venues in West Yorkshire			Wigan
MKM Stadium	* Venues in Greater Manchester † Venues in West Yorkshire			DW Stadium
Capacity: 25,400	* Venues in Greater Manchester † Venues in West Yorkshire			Capacity: 25,138
Huddersfield	* Venues in Greater Manchester † Venues in West Yorkshire			Leeds
Kirklees Stadium	* Venues in Greater Manchester † Venues in West Yorkshire			Headingley Rugby Stadium
Capacity: 24,121	* Venues in Greater Manchester † Venues in West Yorkshire			Capacity: 21,062
St Helens	Doncaster	Warrington	Leigh	Newcastle
Totally Wicked Stadium	Eco-Power Stadium	Halliwell Jones Stadium	Leigh Sports Village	Kingston Park
Capacity: 18,000	Capacity: 15,231	Capacity: 15,200	Capacity: 12,000	Capacity: 10,200

=== Team base camp locations ===
13 base camps were used by the 16 national squads to stay and train before and during the World Cup tournament, as follow:

- Australia: Manchester
- Cook Islands: Tees Valley
- England: Manchester
- Fiji: Kingston upon Hull
- France: Bolton
- Greece: Sheffield
- Ireland: Leeds
- Italy: St Helens
- Jamaica: Leeds
- Lebanon: Leigh
- New Zealand: York
- Papua New Guinea: Warrington
- Samoa: Doncaster
- Scotland: Newcastle upon Tyne
- Tonga: St Helens
- Wales: Preston

== Officiating ==
=== Match officials ===
The list of match officials who officiated across both the men's and women's tournaments was published on 5 October 2022.

- Grant Atkins (Australia)
- Kasey Badger (Australia)
- Dean Bowmer (England)
- Ben Casty (France)
- James Child (England)
- Darian Furner (Australia)
- Adam Gee (Australia)
- Tom Grant (England)
- Marcus Griffiths (England)
- Robert Hicks (England)
- Neil Horton (England)
- Chris Kendall (England)
- Ashley Klein (Australia)
- Aaron Moore (England)
- Liam Moore (England)
- Paki Parkinson (New Zealand)
- Geoffrey Poumes (France)
- Wyatt Raymond (Australia)
- Liam Rush (England)
- Belinda Sharpe (Australia)
- (New Zealand) Michael Smaill (England) (Note: Smaill is a New Zealander who is currently based in England.)
- Jack Smith (England)
- Todd Smith (Australia)
- Gerard Sutton (Australia)
- Rochelle Tamarua (New Zealand)
- Ben Thaler (England)
- Warren Turley (England)
- (Australia) James Vella (England) (Note: Vella is an Australian who is currently based in England.)

=== On-field rules and disciplinary measures ===
Matches were played to the International Rugby League (IRL) rules. Certain differences between the way the rules of Australia and Europe were clarified in September 2022. All drop goals were worth one point and all play the ball infringements resulted in a set restart. Introduced from the Australian National Rugby League (NRL) was the "captain's challenge" where under certain circumstances a team captain was able to ask for the referee's decision to be reviewed. Head injury assessments and subsequent treatment followed the European model.

A new match review panel comprising members from both the RFL and NRL was established for the tournament to deal with disciplinary issues.

== Warm-up matches ==
Pre-tournament practice matches took place on 7 and 8 October, the weekend before the first round of group stage matches of the World Cup.

7 October 2022
19:30 BST (UTC+01:00)

England	50–0	Fiji
	Report

AJ Bell Stadium, Salford (Note: Match originally scheduled to be played at Rochdale)
Attendance: 6,849

7 October 2022
19:45 BST (UTC+01:00)

Cumbria	28–12	Jamaica
	Report

Derwent Park, Workington
Attendance: 3,000

8 October 2022
13:30 BST (UTC+01:00)

Scotland	4–28	England Knights
	Report

Myreside Stadium, Edinburgh

8 October 2022
14:00 BST (UTC+01:00)

France	12–48	Tonga
	Report

The Shay, Halifax
Attendance: 876

8 October 2022
15:00 BST (UTC+01:00)

Wales	22–38	Lebanon
	Report

Heywood Road, Sale
Attendance: 509

8 October 2022
15:00 BST (UTC+01:00)

Bradford Bulls	34–34	Greece
	Report

Odsal Stadium, Bradford
Attendance: 950

8 October 2022
18:00 BST (UTC+01:00)

Leeds Rhinos	0–74	New Zealand
	Report

Headingley Stadium, Leeds
Attendance: 9,125

== Group stage ==
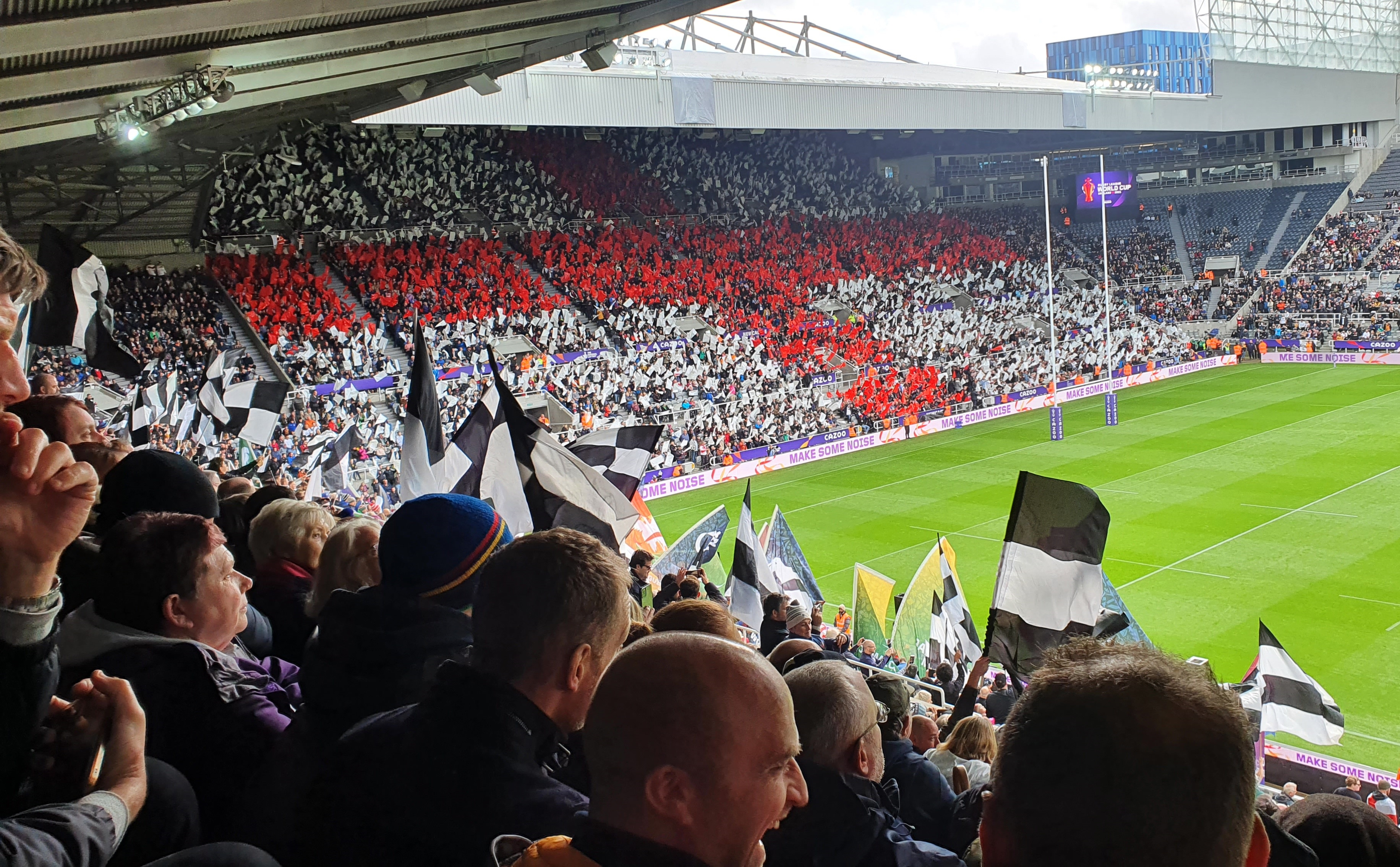
England rugby league fans create an England flag ahead of the opening match at St James' Park

Competing countries were divided into four groups of four teams (groups A to D). Teams in each group played one another in a round-robin, with the top two teams advancing to the knockout stage.

=== Group A ===
Pos	Team	Pld	W	D	L	PF	PA	PD	Pts	Qualification
1	England (H)	3	3	0	0	196	28	+168	6	Advance to knockout stage
2	Samoa	3	2	0	1	140	68	+72	4	Advance to knockout stage
3	France	3	1	0	2	56	116	−60	2	
4	Greece	3	0	0	3	20	200	−180	0	

Source: rlwc2021
(H) Hosts

15 October 2022
14:30 BST (UTC+01:00)

England	60–6	Samoa
Tries: Welsby 22'; Young (2) 25', 30'; Watkins 49'; Farnworth 65'; Whitehead (2) 69', 71'; Makinson 74'; Williams 76'; Burgess 80'; Goals: Makinson (10/12) 6' pen, 23', 26', 49', 63' pen, 66', 69', 71', 74', 79'	Report	Tries: Tago 34'; Goals: Crichton (1/1) 35'

St James' Park, Newcastle
Attendance: 43,199
Referee: Ashley Klein (Australia)
Touch judges: Jack Smith (England), Warren Turley (England)
Player of the Match: Victor Radley (England)

17 October 2022
19:30 BST (UTC+01:00)

France	34–12	Greece
Tries: Dezaria 9'; Gigot 30'; Jullien (2) 34', 74'; Mourgue 47'; Goals: Mourgue (7/7) 10', 24' pen, 30', 36', 49', 67' pen, 76'	Report	Tries: Taukamo 56'; Mougios 79'; Goals: Ilias (2/2) 58', 80'

Eco-Power Stadium, Doncaster
Attendance: 4,182
Referee: Adam Gee (Australia)
Touch judges: Kasey Badger (Australia), James Vella (England)
Player of the Match: Benjamin Garcia (France)

22 October 2022
17:00 BST (UTC+01:00)

England	42–18	France
Tries: Hall (2) 6', 12'; Thompson 24'; Whitehead 45'; Radley 50'; Young (2) 57', 66'; Goals: Sneyd (7/7) 8', 13', 26', 46', 51’, 58', 67'	Report	Tries: Mourgue 29'; Pelissier 33'; Romano 76'; Goals: Mourgue (3/3) 30', 33', 77'

University of Bolton Stadium, Bolton
Attendance: 23,648
Referee: Gerard Sutton (Australia)
Touch judges: Liam Moore (England), Todd Smith (Australia)
Player of the Match: George Williams (England)

23 October 2022
17:00 BST (UTC+01:00)

Samoa	72–4	Greece
Tries: To'o 1'; Paulo 5'; Levi 16', 70'; Harris-Tavita 22', 60'; Hunt 30'; Luai 33'; Lafai (2) 37', 80'; Brown 53'; Crichton 56'; Feagai 64'; Goals: Crichton (10/13) 3', 5', 17', 23', 31', 34', 38', 54', 61', 71'	Report	Tries: Ilias 49'; Goals: Ilias (0/1)

Eco-Power Stadium, Doncaster
Attendance: 4,415
Referee: James Child (England)
Touch judges: Liam Rush (England), Robert Hicks (England)
Player of the Match: Jarome Luai (Samoa)

29 October 2022
14:30 BST (UTC+01:00)

England	94–4	Greece
Tries: Lees 3'; Young (4) 13', 25', 35', 37'; Hall (2) 28', 59'; Burgess (2) 33', 53'; Williams 40'; Makinson 43'; Sneyd 49'; Batchelor 63'; Ackers (2) 67', 75'; Pearce-Paul 73'; McMeeken 77'; Goals: Sneyd (13/17) 4', 27', 34', 36', 39', 40', 43', 50', 55', 60', 68', 76', 77'	Report	Tries: Taukamo 18'; Goals: Ilias (0/1)

Bramall Lane, Sheffield
Attendance: 18,760
Referee: Belinda Sharpe (Australia)
Touch judges: Marcus Griffiths (England), Wyatt Raymond (Australia)
Player of the Match: Marc Sneyd (England)

30 October 2022
17:00 GMT (UTC±00:00)

Samoa	62–4	France
Tries: Lafai (2) 4', 66'; To'o (2) 17', 47'; Ta. May (4) 21', 34', 40', 44'; Milford (2) 62', 74'; Harris-Tavita 69'; Goals: Crichton (9/11) 5', 22', 36', 40', 45', 48', 64', 70', 75'	Report	Tries: Yaha 53'; Goals: Mourgue (0/1)

Halliwell Jones Stadium, Warrington
Attendance: 6,756
Referee: Todd Smith (Australia)
Touch judges: Liam Rush (England), Warren Turley (England)

=== Group B ===
Pos	Team	Pld	W	D	L	PF	PA	PD	Pts	Qualification
1	Australia	3	3	0	0	192	14	+178	6	Advance to knockout stage
2	Fiji	3	2	0	1	98	60	+38	4	Advance to knockout stage
3	Italy	3	1	0	2	38	130	−92	2	
4	Scotland	3	0	0	3	18	142	−124	0	

Source: rlwc2021

15 October 2022
19:30 BST (UTC+01:00)

Australia	42–8	Fiji
Tries: Nanai 16'; Addo-Carr (2) 24', 68'; Crichton 35'; Mitchell 44'; Grant 54'; Tedesco 61'; Goals: Holmes (7/7) 16', 25', 36', 45', 54', 61', 68'	Report	Tries: Valemei 4'; Turuva 76'; Goals: Wakeham (0/2)

Headingley Stadium, Leeds
Attendance: 13,366
Referee: Chris Kendall (England)
Touch judges: Wyatt Raymond (Australia), Darian Furner (Australia)
Player of the Match: Cameron Munster (Australia)

16 October 2022
14:30 BST (UTC+01:00)

Scotland	4–28	Italy
Tries: Walmsley 76'; Goals: Brierley (0/1)	Report	Tries: Polselli 10'; Parata 23'; Maizen (3) 44', 49', 74'; Goals: Campagnolo (4/5) 10', 23' 45', 74'

Kingston Park, Newcastle
Attendance: 6,206
Referee: Todd Smith (Australia)
Touch judges: Paki Parkinson (New Zealand), Marcus Griffiths (England)
Player of the Match: Nathan Brown (Italy)

21 October 2022
19:30 BST (UTC+01:00)

Australia	84–0	Scotland
Tries: Addo-Carr (4) 6', 32', 49', 79'; Wighton (2) 11', 35'; Crichton 15'; Graham (3) 21', 59', 74'; Cleary 28'; Tedesco 41'; Hunt 44'; Burton 66'; Yeo 77'; Goals: Cleary (12/15) 12', 16', 23', 30', 34', 36', 42', 45', 50', 67', 75', 78'	Report

Coventry Building Society Arena, Coventry
Attendance: 10,276
Referee: Grant Atkins (Australia)
Touch judges: Kasey Badger (Australia), Warren Turley (England)
Player of the Match: Josh Addo-Carr (Australia)

22 October 2022
14:30 BST (UTC+01:00)

Fiji	60–4	Italy
Tries: Kikau (2) 9', 23'; Naiqama 12'; Tagituimua (2) 15', 46'; Koroisau 37'; Nakubuwai 51'; Sivo (2) 53', 63'; Sadrugu 79'; Goals: Wakeham (7/7) 10', 13', 17', 25', 38', 47', 51'; Koroisau (2/2) 55', 65'; Raiwalui (1/1) 80'	Report	Tries: Maizen 56'; Goals: Campagnolo (0/1)

Kingston Park, Newcastle
Attendance: 3,675
Referee: Jack Smith (England)
Touch judges: Darian Furner (Australia), James Vella (England)
Player of the Match: Penioni Tagituimua (Fiji)

29 October 2022
17:00 BST (UTC+01:00)

Fiji	30–14	Scotland
Tries: Sadrugu 6'; Kikau 15'; Raiwalui 36'; Sivo 46'; Sims 67'; Goals: Wakeham (5/5) 7', 16', 37', 48', 68'	Report	Tries: Walmsley 21'; Hellewell 40'; Liu 51'; Goals: Schneider (1/3) 63'

Kingston Park, Newcastle
Attendance: 6,736
Referee: Tom Grant (England)
Touch judges: James Child (England), Chris Kendall (England)
Player of the Match: Sunia Turuva (Fiji)

29 October 2022
19:30 BST (UTC+01:00)

Australia	66–6	Italy
Tries: Holmes 7'; Taulagi (2) 14', 40'; Tedesco 19'; Graham (2) 28', 68'; Mitchell 36'; Yeo 46'; Martin 51'; Murray 58'; Nanai 74'; Collins 80'; Goals: Cleary (9/12) 20', 30', 38', 48', 52', 60', 69', 76', 80'	Report	Tries: Palumbo 54'; Goals: Campagnolo (1/1) 55'

Totally Wicked Stadium, St Helens
Attendance: 5,586
Referee: Liam Moore (England)
Touch judges: Michael Smaill (England), Jack Smith (England)
Player of the Match: Jeremiah Nanai (Australia)

=== Group C ===
Pos	Team	Pld	W	D	L	PF	PA	PD	Pts	Qualification
1	New Zealand	3	3	0	0	150	28	+122	6	Advance to knockout stage
2	Lebanon	3	2	0	1	118	60	+58	4	Advance to knockout stage
3	Ireland	3	1	0	2	72	82	−10	2	
4	Jamaica	3	0	0	3	20	190	−170	0	

Source: rlwc2021

16 October 2022
17:00 BST (UTC+01:00)

Jamaica	2–48	Ireland
Goals: Rush 1/1 (39' pen)	Report	Tries: L. Senior (2) 13', 64'; G. King 16'; O'Hagan 19'; Chamberlain 37'; I. Senior 52'; T. King 57'; McDonnell 72'; Bentley 77'; Halton 80'; Goals: Chamberlain (1/5) 20'; Keyes (3/5) 57', 64', 77'

Headingley Stadium, Leeds
Attendance: 6,320
Referee: Ben Casty (France)
Touch judges: Geoffrey Poumes (France), Neil Horton (England)
Player of the Match: Luke Keary (Ireland)

16 October 2022
19:30 BST (UTC+01:00)

New Zealand	34–12	Lebanon
Tries: K. Bromwich 6'; Asofa-Solomona 25'; Hiku 30'; Brown 55'; Manu 57'; Rapana 61'; Goals: Rapana (5/6) 6', 25', 31', 55', 58'	Report	Tries: Mansour 1'; Miski 46'; Goals: Moses (2/2) 1', 47'

Halliwell Jones Stadium, Warrington
Attendance: 5,453
Referee: Grant Atkins (Australia)
Touch judges: Tom Grant (England), Dean Bowmer (England)
Player of the Match: Joseph Manu (New Zealand)

22 October 2022
19:30 BST (UTC+01:00)

New Zealand	68–6	Jamaica
Tries: Watene-Zelezniak (4) 4', 14', 19', 59'; Hiku 9'; Niukore 29'; Kris 37'; Marshall-King (2) 40', 55'; Nicoll-Klokstad 44'; Nikora 53'; Smith (2) 66', 72'; Goals: Foran (6/10) 16', 31', 40', 61', 67', 73'; Watene-Zelezniak (2/3) 45', 54'	Report	Tries: Jones-Bishop 76'; Goals: Rush (1/1) 78'

MKM Stadium, Hull
Attendance: 6,829
Referee: Marcus Griffiths (England)
Touch judges: Belinda Sharpe (Australia), Aaron Moore (England)
Player of the Match: Dallin Watene-Zelezniak (New Zealand)

23 October 2022
14:30 BST (UTC+01:00)

Lebanon	32–14	Ireland
Tries: Robinson 21'; Kiraz 25'; Morkos 31'; El-Zakhem 54'; Miski 58'; Goals: Moses (6/7) 17' pen, 22' 26', 33', 56', 71' pen	Report	Tries: L. Senior (2) 38', 48'; Chamberlain 78'; Goals: Chamberlain (1/3) 50'

Leigh Sports Village, Leigh
Attendance: 6,057
Referee: Adam Gee (Australia)
Touch judges: Tom Grant (England), Warren Turley (Australia)
Player of the Match: Mitchell Moses (Lebanon)

28 October 2022
19:30 BST (UTC+01:00)

New Zealand	48–10	Ireland
Tries: Hughes (2) 15', 60'; Rapana (2) 20', 46'; Hiku (2) 26', 33'; Mulitalo 38'; Fisher-Harris 55'; K. Bromwich 63'; Manu 79'; Goals: Rapana (2/4) 17', 27'; Brown (2/6) 61', 64'	Report	Tries: L. Senior (2) 29', 66'; Goals: Chamberlain (1/3) 12' pen

Headingley Rugby Stadium, Leeds
Attendance: 14,044
Referee: Robert Hicks (England)
Touch judges: James Vella (England), Darian Furner (Australia)
Player of the Match: Jahrome Hughes (New Zealand)

30 October 2022
12:00 GMT (UTC±00:00)

Lebanon	74–12	Jamaica
Tries: Tannous 6'; Miski 9'; El-Zakhem 12'; Robinson 15'; Rajab 23'; Tasipale (2) 27', 55'; Mansour (2) 32', 62'; Doueihi 45'; Maroun 59'; Goals: Moses (7/7) 8', 11', 13', 16', 24', 28', 33'; Doueihi (2/4) 57', 60'	Report	Tries: Agoro 50'; Andrade 66'; Goals: Woodburn-Hall (1/1) 51'; Rush (1/1) 66'

Leigh Sports Village, Leigh
Attendance: 5,006
Referee: Paki Parkinson (New Zealand)
Touch judges: Grant Atkins (Australia), Darian Furner (Australia)
Player of the Match: Adam Doueihi (Lebanon)

=== Group D ===
Pos	Team	Pld	W	D	L	PF	PA	PD	Pts	Qualification
1	Tonga	3	3	0	0	148	34	+114	6	Advance to knockout stage
2	Papua New Guinea	3	2	0	1	86	40	+46	4	Advance to knockout stage
3	Cook Islands	3	1	0	2	44	136	−92	2	
4	Wales	3	0	0	3	18	86	−68	0	

Source: rlwc2021

18 October 2022
19:30 BST (UTC+01:00)

Tonga	24–18	Papua New Guinea
Tries: Penisini 14'; Fotuaika 35'; I. Katoa 37'; Koloamatangi 78'; Goals: I. Katoa (4/5) 16', 36', 39', 79'	Report	Tries: Martin 6'; Lam 41'; Russell 68'; Goals: Martin (3/3) 7', 43', 69'

Totally Wicked Stadium, St Helens
Attendance: 10,409
Referee: Liam Moore (England)
Touch judges: James Child (England), Belinda Sharpe (Australia)
Player of the Match: Edwin Ipape (Papua New Guinea)

19 October 2022
19:30 BST (UTC+01:00)

Wales	12–18	Cook Islands
Tries: Lloyd 13'; Olds 27'; Goals: Fozard (2/2) 15', 29'	Report	Tries: Gelling 22'; Moale 59'; S. Marsters 64'; Goals: S. Marsters (3/4) 24', 40' pen, 61'

Leigh Sports Village, Leigh
Attendance: 6,188
Referee: Robert Hicks (England)
Touch judges: Rochelle Tamarua (New Zealand), Todd Smith (Australia)
Player of the Match: Johnathon Ford (Cook Islands)

24 October 2022
19:30 BST (UTC+01:00)

Tonga	32–6	Wales
Tries: Tupou (3) 21', 51', 71'; Fifita 37'; Koloamatangi 40'; Niu 47'; Goals: Lolohea (3/5) 38', 40', 49'; Talakai (1/1) 72'	Report	Tries: Evans 17'; Goals: Fozard (1/1) 18'

Totally Wicked Stadium, St Helens
Attendance: 7,752
Referee: Kasey Badger (Australia)
Touch judges: Mike Smaill (England), Rochelle Tamarua (New Zealand)
Player of the Match: Daniel Tupou (Tonga)

25 October 2022
19:30 BST (UTC+01:00)

Papua New Guinea	32–16	Cook Islands
Tries: Tai (2) 14', 46'; Laybutt 23'; Martin 41'; Lam 56'; Olam 68'; Goals: Martin (4/6) 24', 42', 57', 69'	Report	Tries: Ulberg 34'; Gelling 60'; Iro 77'; Goals: S. Marsters (2/3) 3' pen, 35'; Takairangi (0/1)

Halliwell Jones Stadium, Warrington
Attendance: 6,273
Referee: Chris Kendall (England)
Touch judges: Wyatt Raymond (Australia), Paki Parkinson (New Zealand)
Player of the Match: Rhyse Martin (Papua New Guinea)

30 October 2022
14:30 GMT (UTC±00:00)

Tonga	92–10	Cook Islands
Tries: Tupou (2) 1', 64'; Taumalolo (2) 13', 20'; Niu (3) 22', 29', 49'; Penisini (4) 26', 32' (pen), 61', 74'; Lolohea (2) 35', 58'; Kaufusi 40'; I. Katoa 44'; Amone 78'; Goals: I. Katoa (14/16) 15', 21', 24', 28', 31', 33', 37', 40', 46', 51', 62', 66', 76', 79'	Report	Tries: S. Marsters 69'; Ti. Arona 80'; Goals: S. Marsters (0/1); Ti. Arona (1/1) 80'

Riverside Stadium, Middlesbrough
Attendance: 8,342
Referee: Ashley Klein (Australia)
Touch judges: Kasey Badger (Australia), Aaron Moore (England)
Player of the Match: Jason Taumalolo (Tonga)

31 October 2022
19:30 GMT (UTC±00:00)

Papua New Guinea	36–0	Wales
Tries: Laybutt 6'; Putt (2) 12', 46'; Ngutlik (2) 18', 76'; Russell 23'; Goals: Martin (6/6) 6', 12', 18', 23', 46', 77'	Report

Eco-Power Stadium, Doncaster
Attendance: 6,968
Referee: Gerard Sutton (Australia)
Touch judges: Belinda Sharpe (Australia), James Child (England)
Player of the Match: Nixon Putt (Papua New Guinea)

== Knockout stage ==
The top 2 teams from each pool advanced to the quarter-finals. All quarter-finalists will automatically qualify for the 2025 Rugby League World Cup.

Quarter-finals
5 November – Wigan
England	46
Papua New Guinea	6
6 November – Warrington
Tonga	18
Samoa	20
4 November – Huddersfield
Australia	48
Lebanon	4
5 November – Hull
New Zealand	24
Fiji	18

Semi-finals
12 November – London
England	26
Samoa (g.p.)	27
11 November – Leeds
Australia	16
New Zealand	14

Final
19 November – Manchester
Samoa	10
Australia	30

=== Quarter-finals ===
4 November 2022
19:30 GMT (UTC±00:00)

Australia	48–4	Lebanon
Tries: Addo-Carr (5) 5', 16', 19', 45', 59'; Mitchell 24'; Murray (2) 30', 33'; Martin 69'; Goals: Cleary (6/9) 17', 31', 34', 46', 60', 70'	Report	Tries: Mansour 52'; Goals: Moses (0/1)

John Smith's Stadium, Huddersfield
Attendance: 8,206
Referee: Chris Kendall (England)
Touch judges: Wyatt Raymond (Australia), Warren Turley (England)
Player of the Match: Josh Addo-Carr (Australia)

5 November 2022
14:30 GMT (UTC±00:00)

England	46–6	Papua New Guinea
Tries: Burgess 6'; Makinson (5) 9', 18', 27', 58', 75'; Young 14'; Williams 21'; Watkins 24'; Goals: Makinson (5/9) 7', 20', 22', 26, 28'	Report	Tries: Ngutlik 70'; Goals: Martin (1/1) 71'

DW Stadium, Wigan
Attendance: 23,179
Referee: Liam Moore (England)
Touch judges: Darian Furner (Australia), Jack Smith (England)
Player of the Match: Tommy Makinson (England)

5 November 2022
19:30 GMT (UTC±00:00)

New Zealand	24–18	Fiji
Tries: Mulitalo 25'; Nikora 48'; Manu 62'; Rapana 78'; Goals: Rapana (4/5) 27', 49', 64', 71' pen	Report	Tries: Sivo 11'; Naiqama (2) 17', 43'; Goals: Wakeham (3/3) 12', 19', 44'

MKM Stadium, Hull
Attendance: 7,080
Referee: Gerard Sutton (Australia)
Touch judges: Belinda Sharpe (Australia), Marcus Griffiths (England)
Player of the Match: Joseph Manu (New Zealand)

6 November 2022
14:30 GMT (UTC±00:00)

Tonga	18–20	Samoa
Tries: Tupou 7'; Taukeiaho 32'; S. Katoa 70'; Goals: I. Katoa (3/4) 33', 49' pen, 71'	Report	Tries: Su'a 4'; Luai 16'; To'o 58'; Goals: Crichton (4/4) 5', 18', 56' pen, 59'

Halliwell Jones Stadium, Warrington
Attendance: 12,674
Referee: Ashley Klein (Australia)
Touch judges: Robert Hicks (England), Kasey Badger (Australia)
Player of the Match: Anthony Milford (Samoa)

=== Semi-finals ===
11 November 2022
19:45 GMT (UTC±00:00)

Australia	16–14	New Zealand
Tries: Addo-Carr 16'; Holmes 30'; Murray 53'; Goals: Cleary (2/3) 18', 55'	Report	Tries: Hughes 11'; Brown 37'; Goals: Rapana (3/3) 13', 26' pen, 39'

Elland Road, Leeds
Attendance: 28,113
Referee: Ashley Klein (Australia)
Touch judges: Warren Turley (England), Wyatt Raymond (Australia)
Player of the Match: Liam Martin (Australia)

12 November 2022
14:30 GMT (UTC±00:00)

England	26–27 (g.p.)	Samoa
Tries: Whitehead 24'; Bateman 44'; Farnworth (2) 63', 77'; Goals: Makinson (5/5) 25', 45', 63', 67' pen, 78'	Report	Tries: Lafai 6'; Sao (2) 30', 56'; Crichton (2) 48', 72'; Goals: Crichton (3/5) 32', 49', 74'; Drop goals: Milford (0/1); Crichton (1/1) 83'; Sin bin: Paulo (yellow card) 12' to 22'

Emirates Stadium, London
Attendance: 40,489
Referee: Gerard Sutton (Australia)
Touch judges: Darian Furner (Australia), Jack Smith (England)
Player of the Match: Jarome Luai (Samoa)

=== Final ===
19 November 2022
16:00 GMT (UTC±00:00)

Australia	30–10	Samoa
Tries: Mitchell (2) 14', 80'; Tedesco (2) 18', 69'; Martin 30'; Murray 53'; Goals: Cleary (3/5) 19', 55', 70'; Addo-Carr (0/1)	Report	Tries: To'o 61'; Crichton 71'; Goals: Crichton (1/2) 63'

Old Trafford, Manchester
Attendance: 67,502
Referee: Ashley Klein (Australia)
Touch judges: Jack Smith (England), Warren Turley (England)
Player of the Match: James Tedesco (Australia)

== Statistics ==
=== Final standings ===
Pos	Grp	Team	Pld	W	D	L	PF	PA	PD	Pts	Final result
1	B	Australia	6	6	0	0	286	42	+244	12	Champions
2	A	Samoa	6	4	0	2	197	142	+55	8	Runners-up
3	A	England (H)	5	4	0	1	268	61	+207	8	Eliminated in semi-finals
4	C	New Zealand	5	4	0	1	188	62	+126	8	Eliminated in semi-finals
5	D	Tonga	4	3	0	1	166	54	+112	6	Eliminated in quarter-finals
6	B	Fiji	4	2	0	2	116	84	+32	4	Eliminated in quarter-finals
7	D	Papua New Guinea	4	2	0	2	92	86	+6	4	Eliminated in quarter-finals
8	C	Lebanon	4	2	0	2	122	108	+14	4	Eliminated in quarter-finals
9	C	Ireland	3	1	0	2	72	82	−10	2	Eliminated in group stage
10	A	France	3	1	0	2	56	116	−60	2	Eliminated in group stage
11	D	Cook Islands	3	1	0	2	44	136	−92	2	Eliminated in group stage
12	B	Italy	3	1	0	2	38	130	−92	2	Eliminated in group stage
13	D	Wales	3	0	0	3	18	86	−68	0	Eliminated in group stage
14	B	Scotland	3	0	0	3	18	142	−124	0	Eliminated in group stage
15	C	Jamaica	3	0	0	3	20	190	−170	0	Eliminated in group stage
16	A	Greece	3	0	0	3	20	200	−180	0	Eliminated in group stage

Updated to match(es) played on 23 November 2022. Source: World Cup 2022
(H) Hosts

=== Top try scorers ===
Rank	Player	Team	Tries
1	Josh Addo-Carr	Australia	12
2	Dom Young	England	9
3	Tommy Makinson	England	7
4	Louis Senior	Ireland	6
4	Josh Mansour	Lebanon	6
4	Daniel Tupou	Tonga	6
7	Campbell Graham	Australia	5
7	Tim Lafai	Samoa	5
7	Will Penisini	Tonga	5
10	Elliott Whitehead	England	4
10	Ryan Hall	England	4
10	Jake Maizen	Italy	4
10	Abbas Miski	Lebanon	4
10	Peta Hiku	New Zealand	4
10	Dallin Watene-Zelezniak	New Zealand	4
10	Taylan May	Samoa	4
10	Tesi Niu	Tonga	4

=== Top goal scorers ===
Rank	Player	Team	Goals
1	Stephen Crichton	Samoa	28
2	Nathan Cleary	Australia	26
3	Isaiya Katoa	Tonga	21
4	Marc Sneyd	England	20
4	Tommy Makinson	England	20
6	Brandon Wakeham	Fiji	15
6	Mitchell Moses	Lebanon	15
8	Jordan Rapana	New Zealand	14
9	Arthur Mourgue	France	10
10	Valentine Holmes	Australia	7

=== Top points scorers ===
Rank	Player	Team	Points
1	Stephen Crichton	Samoa	73
2=	Nathan Cleary	Australia	68
2=	Tommy Makinson	England	68
4	Isaiya Katoa	Tonga	50
5	Josh Addo-Carr	Australia	48
6	Jordan Rapana	New Zealand	40
7	Dom Young	England	36
7	Rhyse Martin	Papua New Guinea	36
9	Mitchell Moses	Lebanon	30
10	Arthur Mourgue	France	28

=== Player discipline ===
==== Yellow cards ====
Rank	Player	Team	Yellow cards
1	Angus Crichton	Australia	1
1	Reubenn Rennie	Cook Islands	1
1	Tom Burgess	England	1
1	Viliame Kikau	Fiji	1
1	Liam Byrne	Ireland	1
1	Robbie Mulhern	Ireland	1
1	Michael Lawrence	Jamaica	1
1	Jalal Bazzaz	Lebanon	1
1	Jaxson Rahme	Lebanon	1
1	Jared Waerea-Hargreaves	New Zealand	1
1	McKenzie Yei	Papua New Guinea	1
1	Anthony Milford	Samoa	1
1	Jaydn Su'a	Samoa	1
1	Junior Paulo	Samoa	1
1	Luke Bain	Scotland	1
1	Dale Ferguson	Scotland	1
1	Kane Linnett	Scotland	1
1	Lachlan Walmsley	Scotland	1

==== Red cards ====
Rank	Player	Team	Red cards
1	Adam Doueihi	Lebanon	1

== Legacy ==
The year's after the tournament, The Guardian cited the 2021 World Cup as the catalyst for the revival of the international game. The newspaper linked the "renewed sense of optimism" for Australia participating in international rugby league to the return of the Ashes in 2025 and the creation of the Rugby League Pacific Championships.

== See also ==
- 2021 Women's Rugby League World Cup
- 2021 Wheelchair Rugby League World Cup
- International rugby league in 2022
- Impact of the COVID-19 pandemic on rugby league
