= 2021 Men's Rugby League World Cup Group C =

Group C of the 2021 Rugby League World Cup is one of the four groups in the 2021 Rugby League World Cup, which will be played in 2022. The group comprises automatic qualifiers New Zealand and Lebanon as well as 2018 Americas Champions Jamaica and Ireland who qualified through the 2019 European play-off tournament.

The pool draw was made on 16 January 2020. The fixtures were announced on 21 July 2020. A revised schedule was issued on 19 November 2021 following the postponement of the tournament from 2021 to 2022.

== Standings ==
Pos	Team	Pld	W	D	L	PF	PA	PD	Pts	Qualification
1	New Zealand	3	3	0	0	150	28	+122	6	Advance to knockout stage
2	Lebanon	3	2	0	1	118	60	+58	4	Advance to knockout stage
3	Ireland	3	1	0	2	72	82	−10	2	
4	Jamaica	3	0	0	3	20	190	−170	0	

Source: rlwc2021

== Matches ==
=== Jamaica vs Ireland ===
16 October 2022
17:00 BST (UTC+01:00)

Jamaica	2–48	Ireland
Goals: Rush 1/1 (39' pen)	Report	Tries: L. Senior (2) 13', 64'; G. King 16'; O'Hagan 19'; Chamberlain 37'; I. Senior 52'; T. King 57'; McDonnell 72'; Bentley 77'; Halton 80'; Goals: Chamberlain (1/5) 20'; Keyes (3/5) 57', 64', 77'

Headingley Stadium, Leeds
Attendance: 6,320
Referee: Ben Casty (France)
Touch judges: Geoffrey Poumes (France), Neil Horton (England)
Player of the Match: Luke Keary (Ireland)

Team details
Jamaica		Position	Ireland
Name	Number	Position	Number	Name
Ben Jones-Bishop	1	Fullback	1	Richie Myler
Mo Agoro	2	Wing	2	Louis Senior
Greg Johnson	3	Centre	3	Ed Chamberlain
Jacob Ogden	4	Centre	4	Toby King
Alex Young	5	Wing	5	Innes Senior
James Woodburn-Hall	6	Stand off/Five eighth	6	Luke Keary
Kieran Rush	7	Scrum half/Half back	7	Joe Keyes
Jordan Andrade	8	Prop forward	8	Liam Byrne
Ashton Golding	9	Hooker	9	Josh Cook
Michael Lawrence	10	Prop forward	10	Jaimin Jolliffe
AJ Wallace	11	Second row	11	James Bentley
Chevaughn Bailey	12	Second row	12	Frankie Halton
Joe Brown	13	Loose forward/Lock forward	13	George King
Aaron Jones-Bishop	14	Interchange	14	Harry Rushton
Bradley Ho	15	Interchange	15	James McDonnell
Keenan Tomlinson	16	Interchange	16	Brendan O'Hagan
Ross Peltier	17	Interchange	17	James Hasson
Rugby League Project

=== New Zealand vs Lebanon ===
16 October 2022
19:30 BST (UTC+01:00)

New Zealand	34–12	Lebanon
Tries: K. Bromwich 6'; Asofa-Solomona 25'; Hiku 30'; Brown 55'; Manu 57'; Rapana 61'; Goals: Rapana (5/6) 6', 25', 31', 55', 58'	Report	Tries: Mansour 1'; Miski 46'; Goals: Moses (2/2) 1', 47'

Halliwell Jones Stadium, Warrington
Attendance: 5,453
Referee: Grant Atkins (Australia)
Touch judges: Tom Grant (England), Dean Bowmer (England)
Player of the Match: Joseph Manu (New Zealand)

Team details
New Zealand		Position	Lebanon
Name	Number	Position	Number	Name
	1	Fullback	1
	2	Wing	2
	3	Centre	3
	4	Centre	4
	5	Wing	5
	6	Stand off/Five eighth	6
	7	Scrum half/Half back	7
	8	Prop forward	8
	9	Hooker	9
	10	Prop forward	10
	11	Second row	11
	12	Second row	12
	13	Loose forward/Lock forward	13
		Interchange
		Interchange
		Interchange
		Interchange
Rugby League Project

=== New Zealand vs Jamaica ===
22 October 2022
19:30 BST (UTC+01:00)

New Zealand	68–6	Jamaica
Tries: Watene-Zelezniak (4) 4', 14', 19', 59'; Hiku 9'; Niukore 29'; Kris 37'; Marshall-King (2) 40', 55'; Nicoll-Klokstad 44'; Nikora 53'; Smith (2) 66', 72'; Goals: Foran (6/10) 16', 31', 40', 61', 67', 73'; Watene-Zelezniak (2/3) 45', 54'	Report	Tries: Jones-Bishop 76'; Goals: Rush (1/1) 78'

MKM Stadium, Hull
Attendance: 6,829
Referee: Marcus Griffiths (England)
Touch judges: Belinda Sharpe (Australia), Aaron Moore (England)
Player of the Match: Dallin Watene-Zelezniak (New Zealand)

Team details
New Zealand		Position	Jamaica
Name	Number	Position	Number	Name
	1	Fullback	1
	2	Wing	2
	3	Centre	3
	4	Centre	4
	5	Wing	5
	6	Stand off	6
	7	Scrum half	7
	8	Prop forward	8
	9	Hooker	9
	10	Prop forward	10
	11	Second row	11
	12	Second row	12
	13	Loose forward	13
		Interchange
		Interchange
		Interchange
		Interchange
Rugby League Project

=== Lebanon vs Ireland ===
23 October 2022
14:30 BST (UTC+01:00)

Lebanon	32–14	Ireland
Tries: Robinson 21'; Kiraz 25'; Morkos 31'; El-Zakhem 54'; Miski 58'; Goals: Moses (6/7) 17' pen, 22' 26', 33', 56', 71' pen	Report	Tries: L. Senior (2) 38', 48'; Chamberlain 78'; Goals: Chamberlain (1/3) 50'

Leigh Sports Village, Leigh
Attendance: 6,057
Referee: Adam Gee (Australia)
Touch judges: Tom Grant (England), Warren Turley (Australia)
Player of the Match: Mitchell Moses (Lebanon)

Team details
Lebanon		Position	Ireland
Name	Number	Position	Number	Name
Jacob Kiraz	1	Fullback	1	Richie Myler
Josh Mansour	2	Wing	3	Ed Chamberlain
Brandon Morkos	4	Centre	4	Toby King
Abbas Miski	5	Centre	5	Innes Senior
Mitchell Moses	7	Wing	6	Luke Keary
Kayne Kalache	8	Stand off/Five eighth	7	Joe Keyes
Elie El-Zakhem	11	Scrum half/Half back	8	Liam Byrne (yellow card) 70'
Charbel Tasipale	12	Prop forward	10	Jaimin Jolliffe
James Roumanos	13	Hooker	11	James Bentley
Andrew Kazzi	15	Prop forward	12	Frankie Halton
Reece Robinson	16	Second row	13	George King
Khaled Rajab	18	Second row	16	Brendan O'Hagan
Khalil Rahme	19	Loose forward/Lock forward	20	Louis Senior
Bilal Maarbani	3	Interchange	9	Josh Cook
Anthony Layoun	14	Interchange	15	Harry Rushton
Jalal Bazzaz (yellow card) 40'	17	Interchange	19	Robbie Mulhern (yellow card) 40'
Jaxson Rahme	20	Interchange	22	James Hasson
Michael Cheika		Coach		Ged Corcoran
Rugby League Project

=== New Zealand vs Ireland ===
28 October 2022
19:30 BST (UTC+01:00)

New Zealand	48–10	Ireland
Tries: Hughes (2) 15', 60'; Rapana (2) 20', 46'; Hiku (2) 26', 33'; Mulitalo 38'; Fisher-Harris 55'; K. Bromwich 63'; Manu 79'; Goals: Rapana (2/4) 17', 27'; Brown (2/6) 61', 64'	Report	Tries: L. Senior (2) 29', 66'; Goals: Chamberlain (1/3) 12' pen

Headingley Rugby Stadium, Leeds
Attendance: 14,044
Referee: Robert Hicks (England)
Touch judges: James Vella (England), Darian Furner (Australia)
Player of the Match: Jahrome Hughes (New Zealand)

Team details
New Zealand		Position	Ireland
Name	Number	Position	Number	Name
Joseph Manu	1	Fullback	1	Richie Myler
Jordan Rapana	5	Wing	20	Louis Senior
Peta Hiku	4	Centre	3	Ed Chamberlain
Briton Nikora	17	Centre	4	Toby King
Ronaldo Mulitalo	2	Wing	5	Innes Senior
Dylan Brown	6	Stand off/Five eighth	6	Luke Keary
Jahrome Hughes	7	Scrum half/Half back	7	Joe Keyes
Jesse Bromwich	8	Prop forward	22	James Hasson
Brandon Smith	9	Hooker	9	Joshua Cook
James Fisher-Harris	10	Prop forward	13	George King
Kenny Bromwich	12	Second row	11	James Bentley
Nelson Asofa-Solomona	16	Second row	12	Frankie Halton
Joseph Tapine	13	Loose forward/Lock forward	21	Ronan Michael
Isaiah Papali'i	11	Interchange	16	Brendan O'Hagan
Kieran Foran	14	Interchange	15	Harry Rushton
Jared Waerea-Hargreaves	18	Interchange	17	Dan Norman
Isaac Liu	20	Interchange	18	Henry O'Kane
Michael Maguire		Coach		Ged Corcoran
Rugby League Project

=== Lebanon vs Jamaica ===
30 October 2022
12:00 GMT (UTC±00:00)

Lebanon	74–12	Jamaica
Tries: Tannous 6'; Miski 9'; El-Zakhem 12'; Robinson 15'; Rajab 23'; Tasipale (2) 27', 55'; Mansour (2) 32', 62'; Doueihi 45'; Maroun 59'; Goals: Moses (7/7) 8', 11', 13', 16', 24', 28', 33'; Doueihi (2/4) 57', 60'	Report	Tries: Agoro 50'; Andrade 66'; Goals: Woodburn-Hall (1/1) 51'; Rush (1/1) 66'

Leigh Sports Village, Leigh
Attendance: 5,006
Referee: Paki Parkinson (New Zealand)
Touch judges: Grant Atkins (Australia), Darian Furner (Australia)
Player of the Match: Adam Doueihi (Lebanon)

Team details
Lebanon		Position	Jamaica
Name	Number	Position	Number	Name
Adam Doueihi	6	Fullback	1	Ben Jones-Bishop
Josh Mansour	2	Wing	2	Mo Agoro
Brad Morkos	4	Centre	5	Alex Young
Reece Robinson	16	Centre	4	Jacob Ogden
Abbas Miski	5	Wing	18	Abevia McDonald
Khaled Rajab	18	Stand off/Five eighth	6	James Woodburn-Hall
Mitchell Moses	7	Scrum half/Half back	7	Kieran Rush
James Roumanos	13	Prop forward	8	Khamisi McCain
Michael Tannous	9	Hooker	9	Jy-mel Coleman
Khalil Rahme	19	Prop forward	10	Michael Lawrence
Elie El-Zakhem	11	Second row	16	Keenen Tomlinson
Charbel Tasipale	12	Second row	12	Joel Farrell
Andrew Kazzi	15	Loose forward/Lock forward	13	Ashton Golding
Anthony Layoun	14	Interchange	3	Joe Brown
Jalal Bazzaz	17	Interchange	11	AJ Wallace
Jaxson Rahme	20	Interchange	22	Chevaughn Bailey
Tony Maroun	22	Interchange	15	Jordan Andrade
Bilal Maarbani	3	Concussion substitute	20	Greg Johnson
Rugby League Project
