= 2021 Men's Rugby League World Cup knockout stage =

The 2021 Rugby League World Cup knockout stage took place after the group stages of the 2021 Men's Rugby League World Cup, and ended with the Final, at Old Trafford. The quarter-finals comprised eight teams; the top two teams from each group; Group A, Group B, Group C and Group D. All quarter-finalists automatically qualified for the 2025 Rugby League World Cup.

== Bracket ==
Quarter-finals
5 November – Wigan
England	46
Papua New Guinea	6
6 November – Warrington
Tonga	18
Samoa	20
4 November – Huddersfield
Australia	48
Lebanon	4
5 November – Hull
New Zealand	24
Fiji	18

Semi-finals
12 November – London
England	26
Samoa (g.p.)	27
11 November – Leeds
Australia	16
New Zealand	14

Final
19 November – Manchester
Samoa	10
Australia	30

== Quarter-finals ==
=== Quarter-final 1: Australia vs Lebanon ===
4 November 2022
19:30 GMT (UTC±00:00)

Australia	48–4	Lebanon
Tries: Addo-Carr (5) 5', 16', 19', 45', 59'; Mitchell 24'; Murray (2) 30', 33'; Martin 69'; Goals: Cleary (6/9) 17', 31', 34', 46', 60', 70'	Report	Tries: Mansour 52'; Goals: Moses (0/1)

John Smith's Stadium, Huddersfield
Attendance: 8,206
Referee: Chris Kendall (England)
Touch judges: Wyatt Raymond (Australia), Warren Turley (England)
Player of the Match: Josh Addo-Carr (Australia)

Team details
Australia		Position	Lebanon
Name	Number	Position	Number	Name
James Tedesco	1	Fullback	1	Jacob Kiraz
Valentine Holmes	4	Wing	2	Josh Mansour
Jack Wighton	10	Centre	4	Brad Morkos
Latrell Mitchell	8	Centre	16	Reece Robinson
Josh Addo-Carr	9	Wing	5	Abbas Miski
Cameron Munster	7	Stand off/Five eighth	6	Adam Doueihi
Nathan Cleary	14	Scrum half/Half back	7	Mitchell Moses
Jake Trbojevic	5	Prop forward	13	James Roumanos
Harry Grant	20	Hooker	14	Anthony Layoun
Tino Fa'asuamaleaui	18	Prop forward	19	Khalil Rahme
Angus Crichton	17	Second row	11	Elie El-Zakhem
Liam Martin	21	Second row	12	Charbel Tasipale
Isaah Yeo	24	Loose forward/Lock forward	15	Andrew Kazzi
Daly Cherry-Evans	2	Interchange	9	Michael Tannous
Patrick Carrigan	13	Interchange	18	Khaled Rajab
Cameron Murray	11	Interchange	17	Jalal Bazzaz
Lindsay Collins	15	Interchange	20	Jaxson Rahme
Mal Meninga		Coach		Michael Cheika
Rugby League Project

=== Quarter-final 2: England vs Papua New Guinea ===
Catherine, Princess of Wales attended this match in her capacity as patron of the Rugby Football League.

5 November 2022
14:30 GMT (UTC±00:00)

England	46–6	Papua New Guinea
Tries: Burgess 6'; Makinson (5) 9', 18', 27', 58', 75'; Young 14'; Williams 21'; Watkins 24'; Goals: Makinson (5/9) 7', 20', 22', 26, 28'	Report	Tries: Ngutlik 70'; Goals: Martin (1/1) 71'

DW Stadium, Wigan
Attendance: 23,179
Referee: Liam Moore (England)
Touch judges: Darian Furner (Australia), Jack Smith (England)
Player of the Match: Tommy Makinson (England)

Team details
England		Position	Papua New Guinea
Name	Number	Position	Number	Name
Sam Tomkins	1	Fullback	1	Alex Johnston
Dom Young	14	Wing	20	Rodrick Tai
Kallum Watkins	3	Centre	3	Nene Macdonald
Herbie Farnworth	4	Centre	4	Justin Olam
Tommy Makinson	2	Wing	19	Jimmy Ngutlik
Jack Welsby	6	Stand off/Five eighth	6	Kyle Laybutt
George Williams	7	Scrum half/Half back	7	Lachlan Lam
Tom Burgess	8	Prop forward	8	Wellington Albert
Michael McIlorum	9	Hooker	9	Edwin Ipape
Chris Hill	18	Prop forward	10	Sylvester Namo
Elliott Whitehead	11	Second row	11	Nixon Putt
John Bateman	12	Second row	12	Rhyse Martin
Victor Radley	13	Loose forward/Lock forward	13	Jacob Alick
Morgan Knowles	15	Interchange	23	Watson Boas
Matty Lees	16	Interchange	15	Dan Russell
Mike Cooper	17	Interchange	16	McKenzie Yei
Mike McMeeken	20	Interchange	22	Jeremiah Simbiken
Shaun Wane		Coach		Stanley Tepend
Rugby League Project

=== Quarter-final 3: New Zealand vs Fiji ===
5 November 2022
19:30 GMT (UTC±00:00)

New Zealand	24–18	Fiji
Tries: Mulitalo 25'; Nikora 48'; Manu 62'; Rapana 78'; Goals: Rapana (4/5) 27', 49', 64', 71' pen	Report	Tries: Sivo 11'; Naiqama (2) 17', 43'; Goals: Wakeham (3/3) 12', 19', 44'

MKM Stadium, Hull
Attendance: 7,080
Referee: Gerard Sutton (Australia)
Touch judges: Belinda Sharpe (Australia), Marcus Griffiths (England)
Player of the Match: Joseph Manu (New Zealand)

Team details
New Zealand		Position	Fiji
Name	Number	Position	Number	Name
Joseph Manu	1	Fullback	1	Sunia Turuva
Jordan Rapana	5	Wing	24	Vuate Karawalevu
Peta Hiku	4	Centre	4	Kevin Naiqama
Charnze Nicoll-Klokstad	21	Centre	19	Semi Valemei
Ronaldo Mulitalo	2	Wing	2	Maika Sivo
Dylan Brown	6	Stand off/Five eighth	9	Apisai Koroisau
Jahrome Hughes	7	Scrum half/Half back	7	Brandon Wakeham
Jesse Bromwich	8	Prop forward	3	Korbin Sims
Brandon Smith	9	Hooker	14	Penioni Tagituimua
James Fisher-Harris	10	Prop forward	13	Tui Kamikamica
Kenneath Bromwich	12	Second row	22	Siua Wong
Nelson Asofa-Solomona	16	Second row	12	Viliame Kikau
Joseph Tapine	13	Loose forward/Lock forward	11	Taniela Sadrugu
Isaiah Papali'i	11	Interchange	20	Henry Raiwalui
Kieran Foran	14	Interchange	16	Lamar Manuel-Liolevave
Briton Nikora	17	Interchange	10	Ben Nakubuwai
Isaac Liu	20	Interchange	17	King Vuniyayawa
Michael Maguire		Coach		Wise Kativerata
Rugby League Project

=== Quarter-final 4: Tonga vs Samoa ===
6 November 2022
14:30 GMT (UTC±00:00)

Tonga	18–20	Samoa
Tries: Tupou 7'; Taukeiaho 32'; S. Katoa 70'; Goals: I. Katoa (3/4) 33', 49' pen, 71'	Report	Tries: Su'a 4'; Luai 16'; To'o 58'; Goals: Crichton (4/4) 5', 18', 56' pen, 59'

Halliwell Jones Stadium, Warrington
Attendance: 12,674
Referee: Ashley Klein (Australia)
Touch judges: Robert Hicks (England), Kasey Badger (Australia)
Player of the Match: Anthony Milford (Samoa)

Team details
Tonga		Position	Samoa
Name	Number	Position	Number	Name
Will Hopoate	1	Fullback	1	Joseph Sua'ali'i
Daniel Tupou	2	Wing	5	Brian To'o
Mosese Suli	19	Centre	4	Stephen Crichton
Will Penisini	4	Centre	25	Tim Lafai
Sione Katoa	5	Wing	2	Taylan May
Isaiya Katoa	24	Stand off/Five eighth	6	Jarome Luai
Tuimoala Lolohea	7	Scrum half/Half back	7	Anthony Milford
Addin Fonua-Blake	8	Prop forward	15	Royce Hunt
Siliva Havili	9	Hooker	9	Danny Levi
Moeaki Fotuaika	17	Prop forward	10	Junior Paulo
Felise Kaufusi	11	Second row	11	Ligi Sao
Keaon Koloamatangi	12	Second row	12	Jaydn Su'a
Jason Taumalolo	13	Loose forward/Lock forward	23	Oregon Kaufusi
Soni Luke	14	Interchange	20	Chanel Harris-Tavita
Siosiua Taukeiaho	10	Interchange	8	Josh Papali'i
David Fifita	18	Interchange	22	Kelma Tuilagi
Ben Murdoch-Masila	21	Interchange	17	Martin Taupau
Kristian Woolf		Coach		Matt Parish
Rugby League Project

== Semi-finals ==
=== Semi-final 1: Australia vs New Zealand ===
11 November 2022
19:45 GMT (UTC±00:00)

Australia	16–14	New Zealand
Tries: Addo-Carr 16'; Holmes 30'; Murray 53'; Goals: Cleary (2/3) 18', 55'	Report	Tries: Hughes 11'; Brown 37'; Goals: Rapana (3/3) 13', 26' pen, 39'

Elland Road, Leeds
Attendance: 28,113
Referee: Ashley Klein (Australia)
Touch judges: Warren Turley (England), Wyatt Raymond (Australia)
Player of the Match: Liam Martin (Australia)

Team details
Australia		Position	New Zealand
Name	Number	Position	Number	Name
James Tedesco (c)	1	Fullback	1	Joseph Manu
Valentine Holmes	4	Wing	2	Ronaldo Mulitalo
Latrell Mitchell	8	Centre	4	Peta Hiku
Jack Wighton	10	Centre	21	Charnze Nicoll-Klokstad
Josh Addo-Carr	9	Wing	5	Jordan Rapana
Cameron Munster	7	Stand off/Five eighth	6	Dylan Brown
Nathan Cleary	14	Scrum half/Half back	7	Jahrome Hughes
Jake Trbojevic	5	Prop forward	8	Jesse Bromwich (c)
Ben Hunt	3	Hooker	9	Brandon Smith
Regan Campbell-Gillard	6	Prop forward	10	James Fisher-Harris
Angus Crichton	17	Second row	11	Isaiah Papali'i
Liam Martin	21	Second row	17	Briton Nikora
Isaah Yeo	24	Loose forward/Lock forward	13	Joseph Tapine
Harry Grant	20	Interchange	14	Kieran Foran
Patrick Carrigan	13	Interchange	15	Moses Leota
Cameron Murray	11	Interchange	16	Nelson Asofa-Solomona
Tino Fa'asuamaleaui	18	Interchange	20	Isaac Liu
Mal Meninga		Coach		Michael Maguire
Rugby League Project

=== Semi-final 2: England vs Samoa ===
Samoa faced England in the semi-final at the Emirates Stadium in London. Tim Lafai scored the first try of the game in the sixth minute to give Samoa a 4–0 lead, and for the first time in the tournament, England conceded first. Five minutes later, Junior Paulo was shown a yellow card, and also put on report, for a dangerous tackle on George Williams. Elliott Whitehead scored England's first try on 25 minutes, with Tommy Makinson successful with the conversion, to give England a 6–4 lead. Five minutes later, Samoa scored again, this time from Ligi Sao to retake the lead 8–4; Stephen Crichton was successful with the conversion to give Samoa a 10–4 lead at half-time.

Five minutes into the second half, England scored again, this time through John Bateman, and Makinson was once again successful with the conversion to make it 10–10. Two tries in seven minutes saw Samoa take a 20–12 lead, with England now needing at least two tries to draw level. Herbie Farnworth broke clear on 65 minutes, to race away and touch down near the posts, giving Makinson an easy conversion. From the kick-off, England were awarded a penalty, after Sam Tomkins was tackled in the air. Samoa used the captain's challenge, and after a quick review, the video referee agreed with the decision to award the penalty, meaning the challenge was unsuccessful. Makinson opted to kick the penalty and was successful, levelling the scores at 20–20 with just over 12 minutes remaining. Stephen Crichton looked to have won it for Samoa with sven minutes to go, as he intercepted a Dom Young pass to touch down under the posts, converting his own try. There was more drama to come, as Farnworth got his second try of the game with two minutes remaining, Makinson once again converting to take the game to extra time.

Samoa attempted to score the golden point with a drop goal early in extra time, but it was charged down by England. Samoa eventually won the match after a forward pass from Sam Tomkins gave them possession 35 metres out. Crichton kicked the winning drop goal to send Samoa to their first World Cup final, making them the first team other than England, Australia or New Zealand to reach the final in 50 years.

The peak TV audience for the match was approximately 2.5 million views, which is the highest for any international rugby league match.

12 November 2022
14:30 GMT (UTC±00:00)

England	26–27 (g.p.)	Samoa
Tries: Whitehead 24'; Bateman 44'; Farnworth (2) 63', 77'; Goals: Makinson (5/5) 25', 45', 63', 67' pen, 78'	Report	Tries: Lafai 6'; Sao (2) 30', 56'; Crichton (2) 48', 72'; Goals: Crichton (3/5) 32', 49', 74'; Drop goals: Milford (0/1); Crichton (1/1) 83'; Sin bin: Paulo (yellow card) 12' to 22'

Emirates Stadium, London
Attendance: 40,489
Referee: Gerard Sutton (Australia)
Touch judges: Darian Furner (Australia), Jack Smith (England)
Player of the Match: Jarome Luai (Samoa)

Team details
England		Position	Samoa
Name	Number	Position	Number	Name
Sam Tomkins	1	Fullback	1	Joseph Suaalii
Dom Young	14	Wing	5	Brian To'o
Kallum Watkins	3	Centre	4	Stephen Crichton
Herbie Farnworth	4	Centre	25	Tim Lafai
Tommy Makinson	2	Wing	2	Taylan May
Jack Welsby	6	Stand off/Five eighth	6	Jarome Luai
George Williams	7	Scrum half/Half back	7	Anthony Milford
Tom Burgess	8	Prop forward	15	Royce Hunt
Michael McIlorum	9	Hooker	21	Fa'amanu Brown
Chris Hill	18	Prop forward	10	Junior Paulo
Elliot Whitehead	11	Second row	11	Ligi Sao
John Bateman	12	Second row	12	Jaydn Su'a
Victor Radley	13	Loose forward/Lock forward	23	Oregon Kaufusi
Mike McMeeken	20	Interchange	20	Chanel Harris-Tavita
Morgan Knowles	15	Interchange	8	Josh Papalii
Luke Thompson	10	Interchange	16	Spencer Leniu
Mike Cooper	17	Interchange	22	Kelma Tuilagi
Shaun Wane		Coach		Matt Parish
Rugby League Project

== Final: Australia vs Samoa ==
19 November 2022
16:00 GMT (UTC±00:00)

Australia	30–10	Samoa
Tries: Mitchell (2) 14', 80'; Tedesco (2) 18', 69'; Martin 30'; Murray 53'; Goals: Cleary (3/5) 19', 55', 70'; Addo-Carr (0/1)	Report	Tries: To'o 61'; Crichton 71'; Goals: Crichton (1/2) 63'

Old Trafford, Manchester
Attendance: 67,502
Referee: Ashley Klein (Australia)
Touch judges: Jack Smith (England), Warren Turley (England)
Player of the Match: James Tedesco (Australia)

Team details
Australia		Position	Samoa
Name	Number	Position	Number	Name
James Tedesco	1	Fullback	1	Joseph Sua'ali'i
Valentine Holmes	4	Wing	2	Taylan May
Jack Wighton	10	Centre	25	Tim Lafai
Latrell Mitchell	8	Centre	4	Stephen Crichton
Josh Addo-Carr	9	Wing	5	Brian To'o
Cameron Munster	7	Stand off/Five eighth	6	Jarome Luai
Nathan Cleary	14	Scrum half/Half back	7	Anthony Milford
Jake Trbojevic	5	Prop forward	10	Junior Paulo
Ben Hunt	3	Hooker	20	Chanel Harris-Tavita
Reagan Campbell-Gillard	6	Prop forward	15	Royce Hunt
Liam Martin	21	Second row	12	Jaydn Su'A
Angus Crichton	17	Second row	11	Ligi Sao
Isaah Yeo	24	Loose forward/Lock forward	13	Oregon Kaufusi
Harry Grant	20	Interchange	22	Kelma Tuilagi
Patrick Carrigan	13	Interchange	8	Josh Papali'i
Cameron Murray	11	Interchange	16	Spencer Leniu
Tino Fa'asuamaleaui	18	Interchange	17	Martin Taupau
Mal Meninga		Coach		Matt Parish
Rugby League Project
