= Alex Young (rugby league) =

Jamaica international rugby league footballer

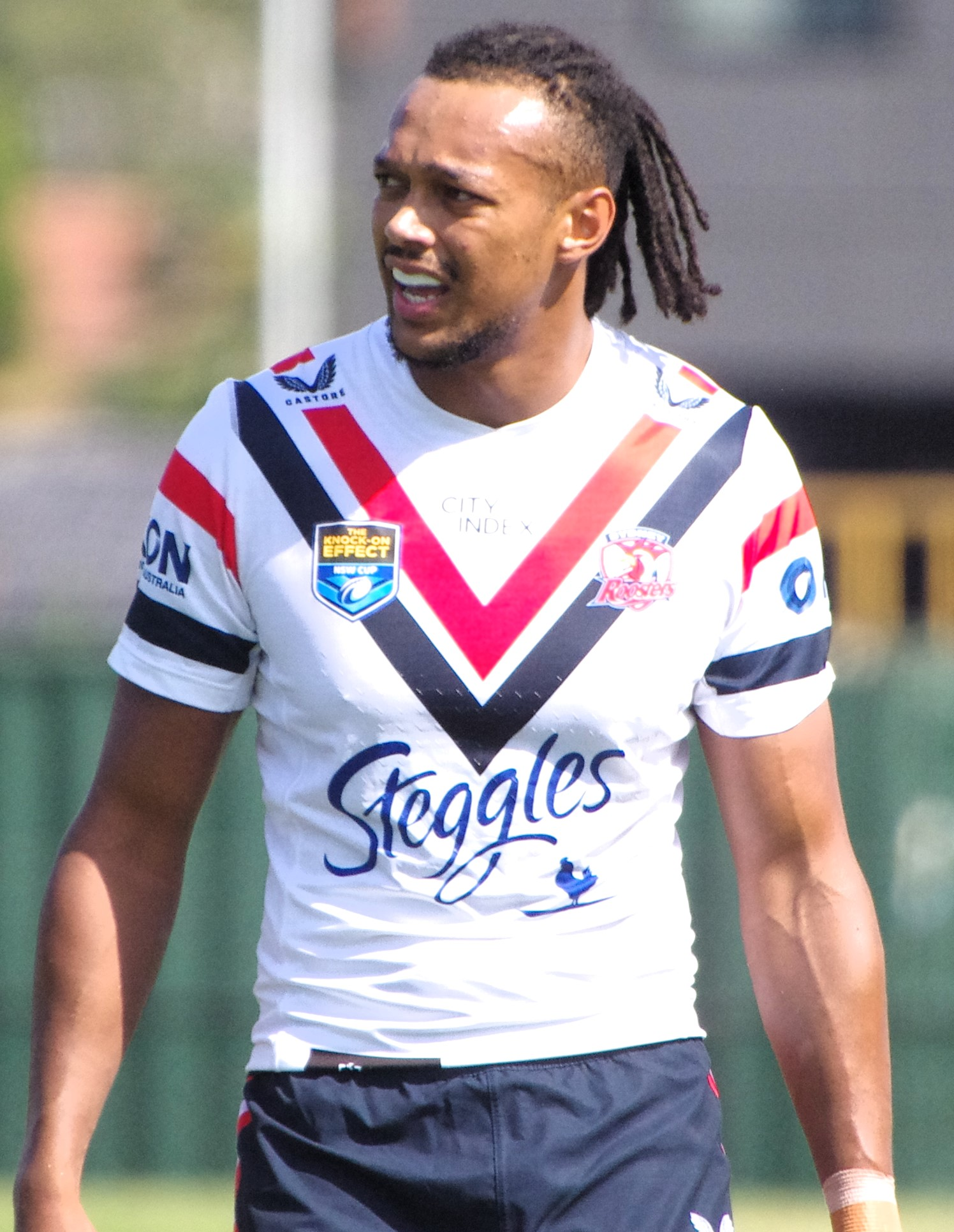

Personal information
- Full name: Alex Young
- Born: 6 April 1999 (age 27) Dewsbury, West Yorkshire, England
- Height: 6 ft 6 in (1.98 m)
- Weight: 100 kg (15 st 10 lb)

Playing information
- Position: Wing, Centre
Club
Years	Team	Pld	T	G	FG	P
2020–22	Workington Town	41	6	0	0	24
2023	Newcastle Thunder	14	5	0	0	20
2023–2024	Sydney Roosters	0	0	0	0	0
	Total	55	11	0	0	44
Representative
Years	Team	Pld	T	G	FG	P
2022–	Jamaica	3	1	0	0	4
- Source: As of 7 February 2023
- Relatives: Dom Young (brother)

Alex Young (born 6 April 1999) is a Jamaica international rugby league footballer who plays as a winger for Cessnock Goannas in Newcastle Rugby League.

== Background ==
Young was born in Dewsbury, West Yorkshire, England. He is of Jamaican descent.

His brother is England international Dom Young.

== Playing career ==
=== Club career ===
Young played in 24 games and scored 1 try for Workington Town in the 2022 RFL Championship. Alex played 3 games for Sydney Roosters in there NSW Cup team, in there round 2 win over Blacktown Workers he attracted 3 defenders providing a crisp offload for Zach Dockar-Clay to score in the corner.

=== International career ===
In 2022 Young was named in the Jamaica squad for the 2021 Rugby League World Cup. He made his debut on the wing in the Group C match against Ireland at Headingley Rugby Stadium in Leeds, West Yorkshire.

=== 2024 ===
Alex played for Jamaica against Wales scoring an 85 metre runaway try, showing his great pace, despite this Jamaica went down 22–16 in a thriller.
