= Papua New Guinea at the Rugby League World Cup =

Papua New Guinea have competed in nine editions of the Rugby League World Cup. Their best finish is the quarter-finals, which they have reached in two tournaments.

== Tournament history ==
World Cup record
Year	Round	Position	GP	W	L	D
1954–1977	Did not participate					
(Australasia) (France) (United Kingdom) 1985–88	Fourth place	4/5	8	2	6	0
(Australasia) (France) (United Kingdom) 1989–92	Fifth place	5/5	8	0	8	0
(United Kingdom) 1995	Group stage	6/10	2	0	1	1
(France) (United Kingdom) 2000	Quarter-finals	6/16	4	3	1	0
(Australia) 2008	Group stage	10/10	3	0	3	0
(England) (Wales) 2013	Group stage	13/14	3	0	3	0
(Australia) (New Zealand) (Papua New Guinea) 2017	Quarter-finals	5/14	4	3	1	0
(England) 2021	Quarter-finals	7/16	4	2	2	0
(Australia) (New Zealand) (Papua New Guinea) 2026	Group stage	6/10	3	1	2	0
Total	0 Titles		39	11	27	1

== Tournaments ==
Key
Colour	Meaning
	Qualifiers to the next round

=== 1985–1988 ===
Team	Played	Won	Drawn	Lost	For	Against	Difference	Points
Australia	8	6	0	2	252	91	+161	12^{1}
New Zealand	8	5	1	2	158	86	+72	11^{1}
Great Britain	8	4	2	2	203	90	+113	10
Papua New Guinea	8	2	0	6	84	325	−241	4^{1}
France	8	1	1	6	35	140	−105	3

^{1} France's 1987 away fixtures against Australia, New Zealand and Papua New Guinea were scratched and each team awarded two points as the French were unable to tour Australasia that year due to financial difficulties.

=== 1989–1992 ===
Key to colours in group tables
Advances to the Final

Team	Played	Won	Drawn	Lost	For	Against	Difference	Points
Australia	8	8	0	0	236	68	+168	16
Great Britain	8	5	0	3	215	79	+136	10
New Zealand	8	5	0	3	203	120	+83	10
France	8	2	0	6	80	247	−167	4
Papua New Guinea	8	0	0	8	84	304	−220	0

=== 1995 ===
Team	Pld	W	D	L	PF	PA	PD	Pts	Qualification
New Zealand	2	2	0	0	47	30	+17	4	Advanced to knockout stage
Tonga	2	0	1	1	52	53	−1	1	
Papua New Guinea	2	0	1	1	34	50	−16	1	

Round	Score	Opposition	Venue
Group Stage	28–28	Tonga	The Boulevard, Hull
Group Stage	6-22	New Zealand	Knowsley Road, St Helens

=== 2000 ===
Team	Played	Won	Drawn	Lost	For	Against	Diff	Points
Papua New Guinea	3	3	0	0	69	42	27	6
France	3	2	0	1	104	37	67	4
Tonga	3	1	0	2	96	76	20	2
South Africa	3	0	0	3	24	138	−114	0

Round	Score	Opposition	Venue
Group Stage	23–20	France	Charlety Stadium, Paris
Group Stage	16–0	South Africa	Stadium de Toulouse, Toulouse
Group Stage	30–22	Tonga	Stadium Municipal d'Albi, Albi
Quarter-Final	8–22	Wales	Auto Quest Stadium, Widnes

=== 2008 ===
Team	Played	Won	Drawn	Lost	For	Against	Diff	Points
Australia	3	3	0	0	128	16	112	6
New Zealand	3	2	0	1	90	60	30	4
England	3	1	0	2	60	110	-50	2
Papua New Guinea	3	0	0	3	34	126	−92	0

Round	Score	Opposition	Venue
Group Stage	22–32	England	Willows Sports Complex, Townsville
Group Stage	6–48	New Zealand	Robina Stadium, Gold Coast
Group Stage	6–46	Australia	Willows Sports Complex, Townsville

=== 2013 ===
Team	Played	Won	Drawn	Lost	For	Against	Diff	Points
New Zealand	3	3	0	0	146	34	112	6
Samoa	3	2	0	1	84	52	32	4
France	3	1	0	2	15	78	-63	2
Papua New Guinea	3	0	0	3	22	103	−81	0

Round	Score	Opposition	Venue
Group Stage	8–9	France	Craven Park, Hull
Group Stage	4–38	Samoa	Craven Park, Hull
Group Stage	10–56	New Zealand	Headingley, Leeds

=== 2017 ===
Team	Pld	W	D	L	PF	PA	PD	Pts	Qualification
Papua New Guinea	3	3	0	0	128	12	+116	6	Advanced to knockout stage
Ireland	3	2	0	1	76	32	+44	4	
Wales	3	0	0	3	18	156	−138	0	

Round	Score	Opposition	Venue
Group Stage	50–6	Wales	National Football Stadium, Port Moresby
Group Stage	14–6	Ireland	National Football Stadium, Port Moresby
Group Stage	64–0	United States	National Football Stadium, Port Moresby
Quarter-Final	6–36	England	Melbourne Rectangular Stadium, Melbourne

=== 2021 ===
Pos	Team	Pld	W	D	L	PF	PA	PD	Pts	Qualification
1	Tonga	3	3	0	0	148	34	+114	6	Advance to knockout stage
2	Papua New Guinea	3	2	0	1	86	40	+46	4	Advance to knockout stage
3	Cook Islands	3	1	0	2	44	136	−92	2	
4	Wales	3	0	0	3	18	86	−68	0	

Source: rlwc2021

Round	Score	Opposition	Venue
Group Stage	18–24	Tonga	Totally Wicked Stadium, St Helens
Group Stage	32–16	Cook Islands	Halliwell Jones Stadium, Warrington
Group Stage	36–0	Wales	Eco-Power Stadium, Doncaster
Quarter-Final	6–46	England	DW Stadium, Wigan

=== 2026 ===
Pos	Pool	Team	Pld	W	D	L	PF	PA	PD	Pts	Qualification
1	C	Tonga	3	3	0	0	86	30	+56	6	Advance to knockout stage
2	B	Samoa	3	2	0	1	160	30	+130	4	Advance to knockout stage
3	B	England	3	2	0	1	128	42	+86	4	
4	C	Papua New Guinea (H)	3	1	0	2	60	116	−56	2	
5	B	Lebanon	3	1	0	2	42	98	−56	2	
6	C	France	3	0	0	3	24	184	−160	0	

Source: Source
Rules for classification: Pool stage tiebreakers
(H) Hosts

Round	Score	Opposition	Venue
Group Stage	42–18	Lebanon	National Football Stadium, Port Moresby
Group Stage	6–64	Samoa	National Football Stadium, Port Moresby
Group Stage	12–34	England	WIN Stadium, Wollongong
