= Kieran Rush =

Jamaica international rugby league footballer

Personal information
- Full name: Kieran James Rush
- Born: 3 September 2002 (age 24) Dewsbury, West Yorkshire, England
- Height: 5 ft 10 in (1.77 m)
- Weight: 13 st 8 lb (86 kg)

Playing information
- Position: Scrum-half, Hooker
Club
Years	Team	Pld	T	G	FG	P
2022–26	Huddersfield Giants	39	1	3	0	10
2022(loan)	→ Swinton Lions	1	0	0	0	0
2022(loan)	→ Rochdale Hornets	11	0	13	0	26
2023(loan)	→ Keighley Cougars	6	1	3	0	10
2024(loan)	→ Dewsbury Rams	4	0	0	0	0
2026(loan)	→ Halifax Panthers	2	0	4	0	8
	Total	63	2	23	0	54
Representative
Years	Team	Pld	T	G	FG	P
2022–	Jamaica	5	0	4	0	6
- Source: As of 27 October 2025

Kieran Rush (born 3 September 2002) is a Jamaica international rugby league footballer who last played as a scrum-half or hooker for the Huddersfield Giants in the Super League.

He has spent time on loan from Huddersfield at Swinton Lions, Rochdale Hornets and Keighley Cougars in League One, and at Dewsbury Rams and Halifax Panthers in the Championship.

He is a product of the Giants Academy system.

== Background ==
Rush was born in Dewsbury, West Yorkshire, England. He is of Jamaican descent.

== Playing career ==
=== Club career ===
Rush was previously contracted to the Huddersfield Giants in the Super League after progressing through the clubs' Academy systems. He made his Super League Debut for the Giants in round 12 of Super League 2023 against the Leigh Leopards.

=== International career ===
In 2022 Rush was named in the Jamaica squad for the 2021 Rugby League World Cup. He made his debut in the halves in the Group C match against Ireland at Headingley Rugby Stadium in Leeds, West Yorkshire. Rush made history when he kicked a penalty goal to register Jamaica's first ever points in a Rugby League world cup.
