= Josh Cook (rugby league) =

Ireland international rugby league footballer

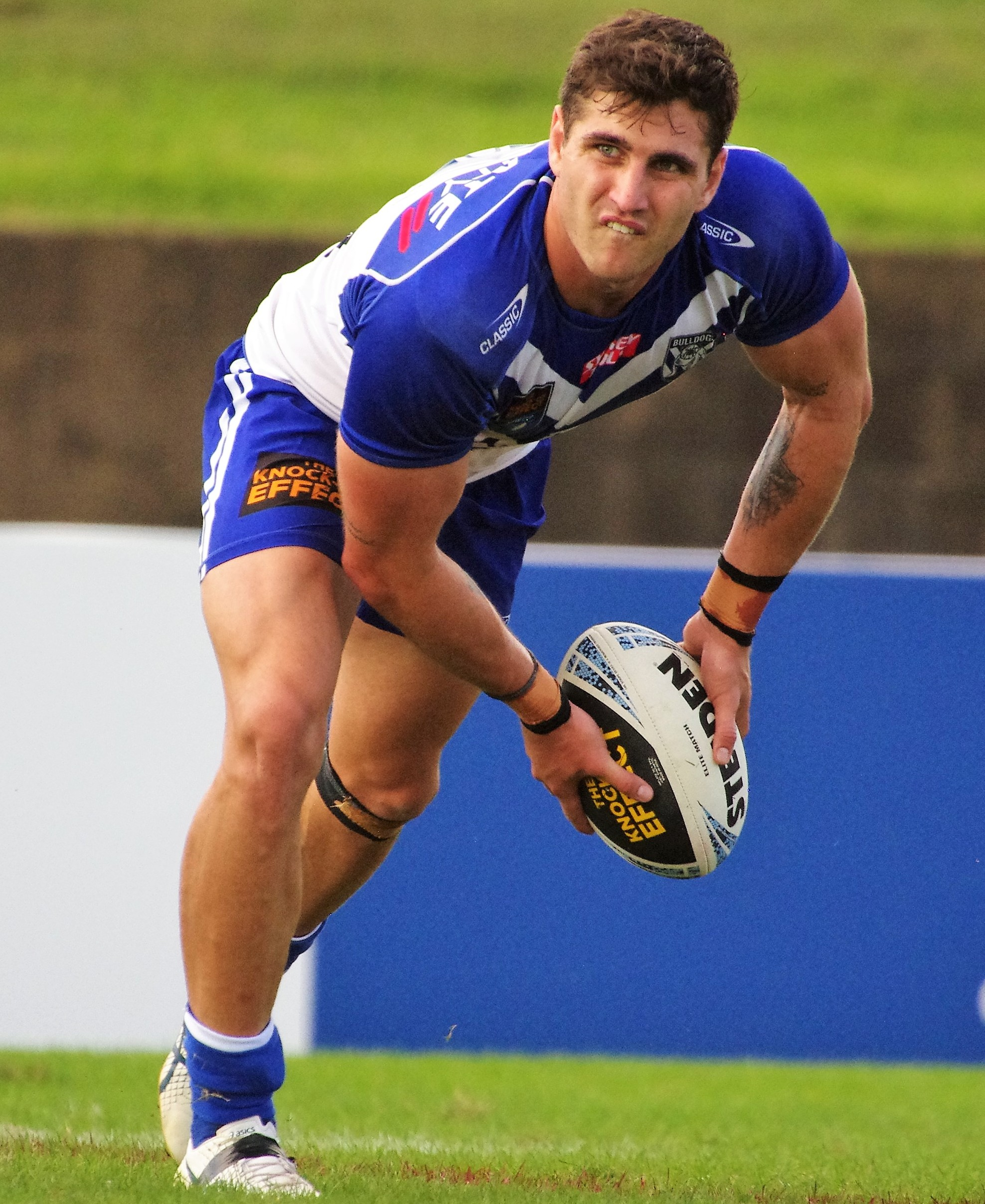

Personal information
- Full name: Joshua Cook
- Born: 28 April 1999 (age 26); Sydney, New South Wales, Australia
- Height: 6 ft 0 in (1.83 m)
- Weight: 13 st 5 lb (85 kg)

Playing information
- Position: Hooker
Representative
Years	Team	Pld	T	G	FG	P
2022–	Ireland	3	0	0	0	0
- As of 30 October 2022

Joshua Cook (born 28 April 1999) is a professional rugby league footballer who plays as a hooker for Ireland.

== Background and playing career ==
From the Sydney suburb of La Perouse, Cook represented New South Wales in the under 16s and the New South Wales Indigenous under 16s teams in 2015.

=== North Sydney Bears ===
In 2018, he played for the North Sydney Bears in the Canterbury Cup, making 2 appearances for the season. Cook then signed with South Sydney, where he would score a try in 5 appearances for the 2019 Canterbury Cup season. In 2020, he only made one appearance for the season (round 1 against the Newtown Jets) before the rest of the season was cancelled due to the COVID-19 pandemic. In 2021, he scored a try against the Penrith Panthers (NSW Cup) in round 1. He played in 8 games until the conclusion of round 15 which marked the time the remainder of the season was cancelled due to the outbreak of Coronavirus in New South Wales.

He did not play a game for the South Sydney club in 2021 and has yet to play an NRL game, due to troubles with a shoulder injury, alongside COVID-19 restrictions.

=== Canterbury–Bankstown Bulldogs ===
In September 2021, following the expiration of his two-year deal with South Sydney, Cook signed a two-year deal with the Canterbury–Bankstown Bulldogs. The second year was a club option. Cook is of Irish descent. Cook is also Indigenous, part of the Bidjigal and Yuin clans.

In October 2022 Cook was released from the Canterbury-Bankstown Bulldogs following a decision by the club to not take up the second year option in the contract, after failing to crack into the Bulldogs NRL team.

=== Ireland ===
He made his international debut on 16 October 2022 against Jamaica.
