= Harry Rushton =

Ireland international rugby league footballer

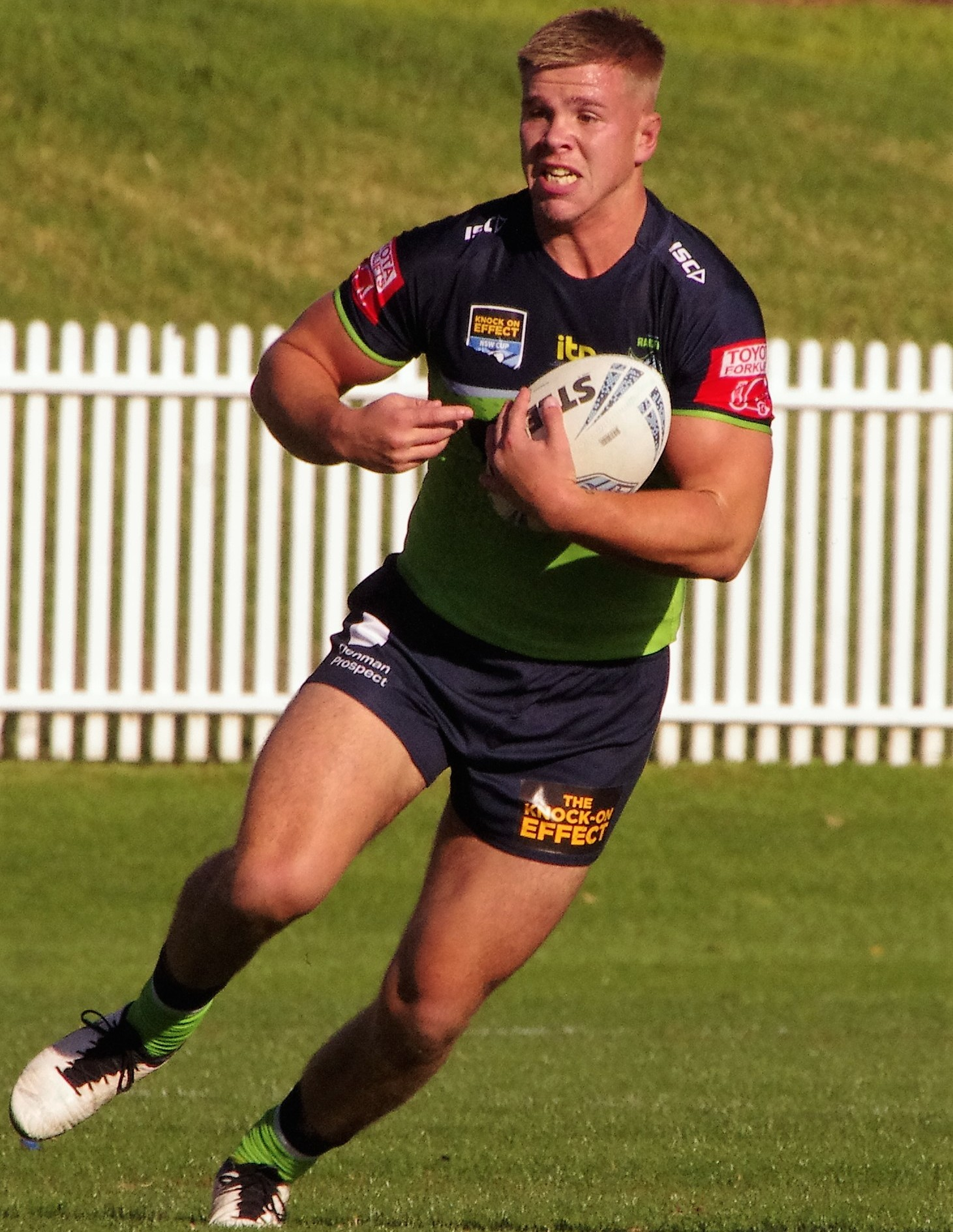

Personal information
- Full name: Harry Rushton
- Born: 13 November 2001 (age 24) Blackpool, Lancashire, England
- Height: 6 ft 3 in (1.90 m)
- Weight: 15 st 13 lb (101 kg)

Playing information
- Position: Second-row, Loose forward, Prop
Club
Years	Team	Pld	T	G	FG	P
2020–21	Wigan Warriors	1	0	0	0	0
2022	Canberra Raiders	3	0	0	0	0
2023–	Huddersfield Giants	76	5	0	0	20
	Total	80	5	0	0	20
Representative
Years	Team	Pld	T	G	FG	P
2022–	Ireland	6	1	0	0	4
- Source: As of 2 November 2025

Harry Rushton (born 13 November 2001) is an Ireland international rugby league footballer who plays as a loose forward, prop or second-row forward for the Huddersfield Giants in the Super League.

He previously played for the Wigan Warriors in the Super League and the Canberra Raiders in the NRL. Rushton will join the Huddersfield Giants ahead of the 2023 Super League season.

== Background ==
Rushton is of Irish descent.

Rushton played his amateur rugby league for the Shevington Sharks.

== Career ==
=== 2020 ===
Rushton made his Super League debut in round 14 of the 2020 Super League season for Wigan against St Helens, losing 42–0 against a much more experienced squad. Rushton started the match playing at Second-row and became Wigan Warriors' player #1107.

=== 2021 ===
Rushton had joined the Canberra Raiders on a three-year deal starting from the 2021 season. He played 10 games in Canberra's NSW Cup team in 2021, playing six games in the second row, three at lock and one at prop - before the season was cancelled due to the COVID pandemic.

=== 2022 ===
In round 7 of the 2022 NRL season, Rushton made his club debut for Canberra in their 36-6 loss against Penrith. On 12 August 2022, it was announced that Rushton would be joining Huddersfield Giants for 2023, after mutually agreeing to his release from Canberra Raiders.

=== 2023 ===
Rushton played 12 games for Huddersfield in the 2023 Super League season as the club finished ninth on the table and missed the playoffs.

=== 2024 ===
Rushton played 22 matches for Huddersfield in the 2024 Super League season, as well as 3 in the challenge cup, which saw the club finish 9th on the table.

=== 2025 ===
Rushton played 20 matches for Huddersfield in the 2025 Super League season as the club finished 10th on the table.
