= Jimmy Ngutlik =

Fiji & PNG international rugby league footballer

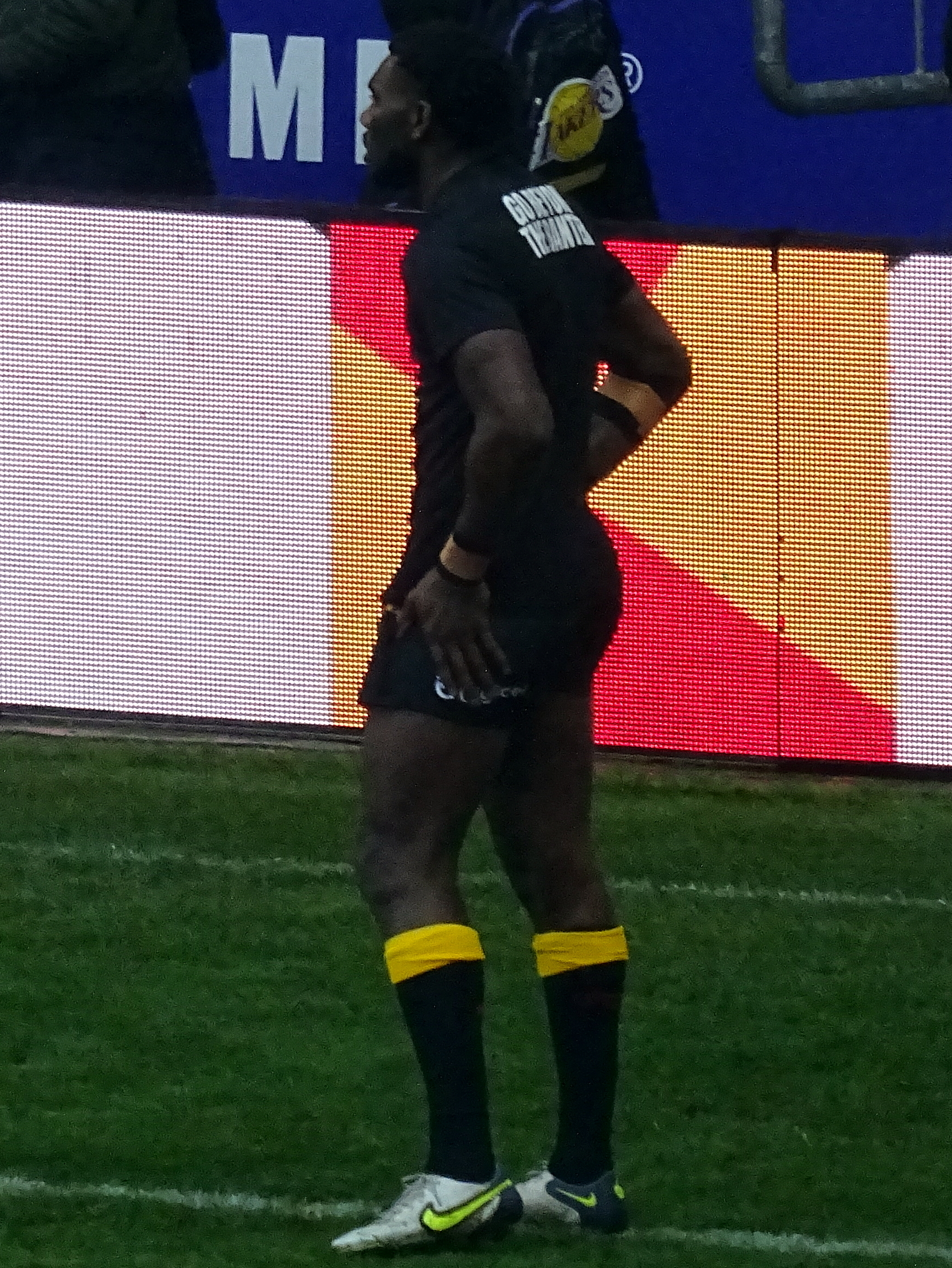

Personal information
- Full name: James Ngutlik
- Born: 20 June 2000 (age 26) Kokopo, East New Britain Province, Papua New Guinea
- Height: 186 cm (6 ft 1 in)
- Weight: 96 kg (15 st 2 lb)

Playing information
- Position: Wing, Centre, Fullback
Club
Years	Team	Pld	T	G	FG	P
2022–24	Western Suburbs	4	1	0	0	4
2025–	Mackay Cutters	28	25	0	0	100
	Total	32	26	0	0	104
Representative
Years	Team	Pld	T	G	FG	P
2022	PNG Prime Minister's XIII	1	1	0	0	4
2022–25	Papua New Guinea	3	3	0	0	12
2026	Fiji	0	0	0	0	0
- Source: As of 10 October 2026

Jimmy Ngutlik (born 20 June 2000) is a Papua New Guinean professional rugby league footballer who plays as a winger and centre for the Mackay Cutters in the Queensland Cup and Papua New Guinea at international level.

== Career ==
Ngutlik made his international debut for Papua New Guinea in their 32-16 win over Cook Islands in the 2021 Rugby League World Cup. In the final group stage game at the 2021 Rugby League World Cup, Ngutlik scored two tries for Papua New Guinea in the 36-0 victory over Wales.
