= McKenzie Yei =

PNG international rugby league footballer

Personal information
- Full name: McKenzie Yei
- Born: 3 June 1997 (age 28) Mount Hagen, Papua New Guinea
- Height: 184 cm (6 ft 0 in)
- Weight: 115 kg (18 st 2 lb)

Playing information
- Position: Prop
Club
Years	Team	Pld	T	G	FG	P
2018–19	PNG Hunters	35	1	0	0	4
2021–22	Central Queensland Capras	0	0	0	0	0
2023–24	Featherstone Rovers	20	5	0	0	20
2024(loan)	→ Hunslet RLFC	1	0	0	0	0
2025–	Oldham RLFC	0	0	0	0	0
2025	→ Dewsbury Rams (loan)	2	0	0	0	0
	Total	58	6	0	0	24
Representative
Years	Team	Pld	T	G	FG	P
2022	PNG Prime Minister's XIII	1	0	0	0	0
2022–	Papua New Guinea	4	1	0	0	4
- Source: As of 25 May 2026

McKenzie Yei is a Papua New Guinean professional rugby league player who plays as a prop Oldham RLFC in the Betfred Championship and Papua New Guinea at international level.

He previously played for the PNG Hunters and the Central Queensland Capras in the QLD Cup.

== Career ==
Yei made his international debut for Papua New Guinea in their 24-14 victory over Fiji in the 2022 Pacific Test. In the second group stage match at the 2021 Rugby League World Cup, Yei was sent to the sin bin for a dangerous high tackle during Papua New Guinea's 32-16 victory over the Cook Islands.

=== Oldham R.L.F.C. ===
On 26 April 2024 it was reported that he had signed for Oldham RLFC in the RFL Championship on a 1-year deal.

=== Dewsbury Rams (loan) ===
On 4 June 2025 it was reported that he had signed for Dewsbury Rams in the RFL League 1 on loan, until the end of the 2025 season
