= Ed Chamberlain =

Ireland international rugby league footballer

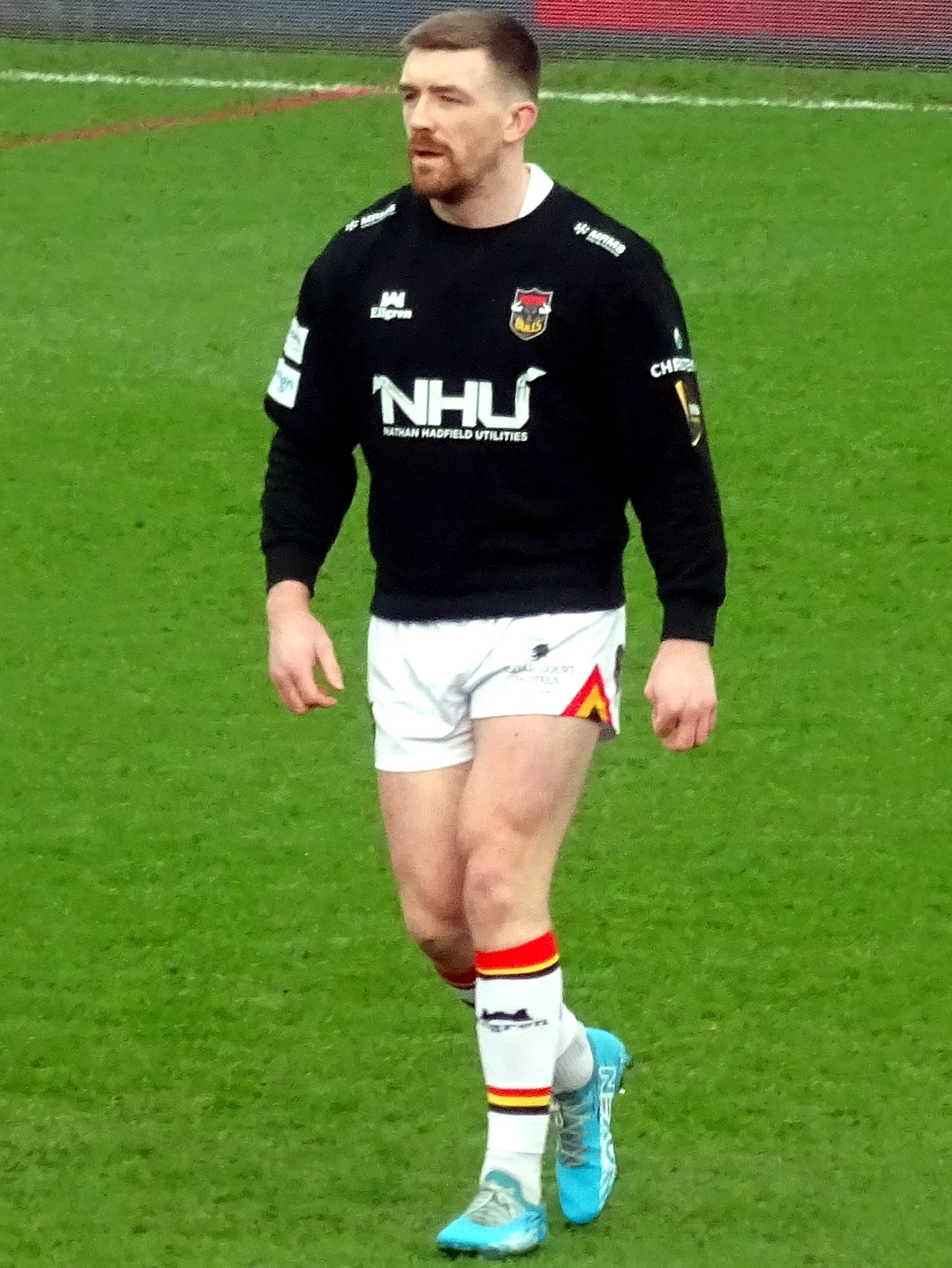

Personal information
- Full name: Edward Chamberlain
- Born: 8 February 1996 (age 30) Warrington, Cheshire, England
- Height: 5 ft 11 in (1.80 m)
- Weight: 12 st 13 lb (82 kg)

Playing information
- Position: Centre, Second-row, Wing, Fullback
Club
Years	Team	Pld	T	G	FG	P
2015–18	Widnes Vikings	22	3	7	0	26
2015(loan)	→ Whitehaven	12	3	30	0	72
2016(loan)	→ Whitehaven	18	5	18	0	56
2017(loan)	→ Workington Town	10	2	0	0	8
2017(loan)	→ Bradford Bulls	5	3	0	0	12
2018(loan)	→ Salford Red Devils	3	0	4	0	8
2018–21	Salford Red Devils	15	6	46	0	116
2020(loan)	→ London Broncos	1	0	0	0	0
2021(loan)	→ London Broncos	6	0	1	0	2
2022–24	Leigh Leopards	30	17	13	0	94
2024(loan)	→ Hull F.C.	8	0	0	0	0
2025–	Hull F.C.	20	1	0	0	4
2026(loan)	→ Bradford Bulls	14	0	0	0	0
	Total	164	40	119	0	398
Representative
Years	Team	Pld	T	G	FG	P
2017–	Ireland	6	2	3	0	14
- Source: As of 14 October 2026

Ed Chamberlain (born 8 February 1996) is an Ireland international rugby league footballer who plays as a second-row forward or centre for Hull FC in the Super League.

He has featured for a number of clubs throughout his career, and played as a winger and fullback earlier in his career.

== Background ==
Chamberlain was born in Warrington, Cheshire, England.

== Career ==
He has previously played for the Widnes Vikings in the Super League, and on loan from Widnes at Whitehaven and the Bradford Bulls in the Championship, Workington Town in League 1 and Salford in the Super League. Chamberlain has also spent time on loan from Salford at London during the 2019 RFL Championship season.

He has been dual-registered with Whitehaven in the Championship.

=== Leigh ===
On 20 October 2021, it was reported that he had signed for Leigh Centurions in the RFL Championship On 28 May 2022, Chamberlain played for Leigh in their 2022 RFL 1895 Cup final victory over Featherstone. On 12 August 2023, Chamberlain played for Leigh in their 17-16 Challenge Cup final victory over Hull Kingston Rovers. It was Leigh's first major trophy in 52 years. Chamberlain played 16 games for Leigh in the 2023 Super League season as the club finished fifth on the table and qualified for the playoffs. Chamberlain played in their elimination playoff loss against Hull Kington Rovers.

=== Hull F.C. (loan) ===
On 23 April 2024 it was reported that he had signed for Hull F.C. in the Super League on loan. On 16 Jul 2024 it was reported that he had rejoined Hull FC on loan for the remainder of the 2024 season.

=== Hull F.C. ===
On 9 July 2024 it was reported that he had signed for Hull F.C. in the Super League on a permanent basis.

=== Bradford Bulls (loan) ===
On 11 November 2025 it was reported that he had signed for Bradford Bulls in the Super League on season-long loan

=== International ===
He was named in the Ireland squad for the 2017 Rugby League World Cup.
