= Frankie Halton =

Ireland international rugby league player (b.1996)

Personal information
- Full name: Frankie William Halton
- Born: 18 June 1996 (age 29) Leigh, England
- Height: 6 ft 2 in (1.88 m)
- Weight: 16 st 3 lb (103 kg)

Playing information
- Position: Second-row, Loose forward
Club
Years	Team	Pld	T	G	FG	P
2019–20	Swinton Lions	29	4	0	0	16
2021	Featherstone Rovers	23	8	0	0	32
2022–23	Hull Kingston Rovers	27	7	0	0	28
2023–	Leigh Leopards	28	1	0	0	4
	Total	107	20	0	0	80
Representative
Years	Team	Pld	T	G	FG	P
2019–	Ireland	5	1	0	0	4
- Source: As of 15 October 2024

Frankie Halton (born 18 June 1996) is an Ireland international rugby league footballer who plays as a second-row forward for the Leigh Leopards in the Super League.

He has previously played at club level for the Swinton Lions and Featherstone Rovers in the Championship.

== Background ==
Born in Manchester, Halton started his rugby league career in the reserve team at the Leigh Centurions. When the reserve team was discontinued, he was loaned out to the North Wales Crusaders, but Halton chose to return to amateur rugby instead, and spent the next few seasons with Leigh Miners Rangers.

== Playing career ==
=== Swinton Lions ===
Halton returned to the professional game in 2019, signing for Swinton Lions.

=== Featherstone Rovers ===
In September 2020, Halton signed a two-year contract with Featherstone Rovers.

He reached the 1895 Cup final with Featherstone, but did not play in the final as he was required to self-isolate due to COVID-19.

His final game for the club was in the Million Pound Game against Toulouse.

=== Hull Kingston Rovers ===
In July 2021, Halton signed a two-year contract with Hull Kingston Rovers beginning at the start of the 2022 season.

In July 2022, Halton extended his contract with the club until the end of the 2025 season. On 17 May 2023, Halton signed a two-and-a-half-year deal to join the newly promoted Leigh side effective immediately.

=== Leigh ===
Halton made his debut for Leigh in a 30–12 win against Warrington, but suffered a torn pectoral injury which ruled him out for an extended period. Halton played 26 games for Leigh in the 2024 Super League season which saw the club finish fifth on the table.
