= Dom Young =

England international rugby league footballer (born 2001)

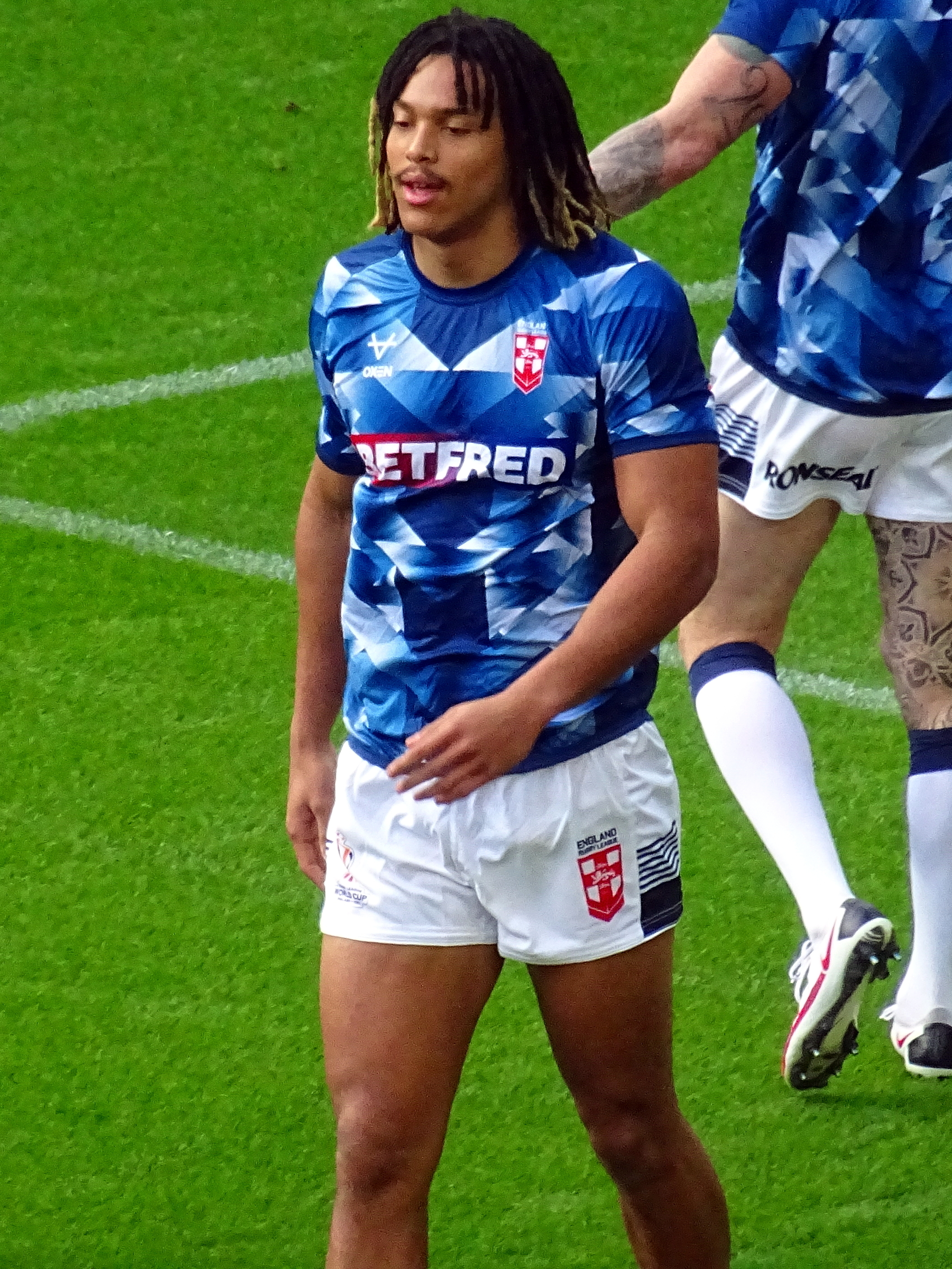

Personal information
- Full name: Dominic Elliot Young
- Born: 9 August 2001 (age 25) Dewsbury, West Yorkshire, England
- Height: 200 cm (6 ft 7 in)
- Weight: 107 kg (16 st 12 lb)

Playing information
- Position: Wing
Club
Years	Team	Pld	T	G	FG	P
2019–20	Huddersfield Giants	2	0	0	0	0
2021–23	Newcastle Knights	51	43	0	0	172
2024–25	Sydney Roosters	31	26	0	0	104
2025–	Newcastle Knights	37	27	0	0	108
	Total	121	96	0	0	384
Representative
Years	Team	Pld	T	G	FG	P
2022–	England	11	14	0	0	56
- Source: As of 15 November 2026
- Relatives: Alex Young (brother)

Dominic Elliot Young (born 9 August 2001) is an English professional rugby league footballer who plays as a winger for the Newcastle Knights in the National Rugby League (NRL) and England at international level.

He previously played for the Huddersfield Giants in the Super League, and the Sydney Roosters in the NRL.

== Background ==
Young was born in Dewsbury, in West Yorkshire, England, and is of Jamaican descent. He is a product of the Huddersfield Giants academy system.

His brother Alex Young plays for the Cessnock Goannas in the Newcastle Rugby League and Jamaica at international level.

== Playing career ==
=== 2019 ===
In round 18 of the Super League XXIV season, Young made his Super League debut for Huddersfield against St. Helens at the age of 17.

=== 2020 ===
On 7 August, it was announced that Young had signed a three-year contract with Australian side, Newcastle Knights in the National Rugby League starting in 2021.

=== 2021 ===
In round 3 of the 2021 season, Young made his NRL debut for the Knights against the Wests Tigers, playing in the centres as a replacement for the injured Bradman Best. Young made a total of six appearances for Newcastle in the 2021 NRL season scoring four tries. He was set to represent Jamaica at the 2021 Rugby League World Cup however the tournament was postponed due to the COVID-19 pandemic.

=== 2022 ===
In round 16 of the 2022 NRL season, Young scored a hat-trick in Newcastle's 38–12 win over the bottom placed Gold Coast side. In round 23, Young scored two tries for Newcastle in a 22–28 loss against Canberra. In round 25, Young scored two tries in a 16–38 loss against Cronulla.

On 15 September, Young made his debut for England at the 2021 Rugby League World Cup against Samoa scoring two tries in a 60–6 victory. In the second group stage match, Young scored a further two tries for England as they defeated France 42–18. In the third group stage match, Young scored four tries for England in their 94–4 victory over Greece.

=== 2023 ===
In February 2023, Young signed a four-year deal to join the Sydney Roosters starting in 2024. In round 5 of the 2023 NRL season, Young scored four tries for Newcastle in their 32–32 draw with Manly. In round 20, Young scored two tries for Newcastle in their 34–18 victory over the bottom placed Wests Tigers.

In round 27, Young scored two tries in the final five minutes of Newcastle's victory over the St. George Illawarra Dragons, breaking the previous club record of 21 tries in a single season, and setting a new record of 23, as the Knights went on to win their 9th game in a row. In the 2023 elimination final, Young scored two tries for Newcastle in their 30-28 extra-time victory over Canberra, pushing his record out to 25 tries.

=== 2024 ===
In round 2 of the 2024 NRL season, Young made his club debut for the Sydney Roosters, scoring a try in their 21–14 loss against Manly. The following week, he scored a try in the clubs 48–6 victory over arch-rivals South Sydney. In round 5, Young was sent off for a high tackle in the clubs 30–26 loss against Canterbury. In round 11, Young scored two tries in a 38–18 win over the New Zealand Warriors. Young played a total of 22 games for the Sydney Roosters in the 2024 NRL season scoring 20 tries. Young played in the clubs preliminary final loss against Melbourne.

=== 2025 ===
Young was dropped from the round 8 game against the St. George Illawarra Dragons due to poor form, particularly in defensive decisions leading to Sydney Roosters conceding a number of tries in the beginning of the season. On 6 May, it was announced by the Sydney Roosters that Young was free to leave the club immediately. On 19 May, Young was recalled from reserve grade for the clubs round 12 match against Cronulla. In a mid-season move, Young would return to the Newcastle club and play in their round 15 loss to the Sydney Roosters. Young made a total of ten appearances for Newcastle in the 2025 NRL season scoring four tries as the club finished with the Wooden Spoon for a fifth time.

=== 2026 ===
On 3 September 2026, the Newcastle outfit announced that Young had re-signed with the club until the end of 2030. Marzhew played 27 matches for Newcastle in the 2026 NRL season including their 2026 NRL Grand Final loss to the Sydney Roosters. Young played 27 matches for Newcastle in the 2026 NRL season including their 2026 NRL Grand Final loss to the Sydney Roosters.

== Statistics ==
Year	Team	Games	Tries	Pts
2019	Huddersfield Giants	1		
2020	Huddersfield Giants	1		
2021	Newcastle Knights	6	4	16
2022	Newcastle Knights	20	14	56
2023	Newcastle Knights	25	25	100
2024	Sydney Roosters	22	20	80
2025	Sydney Roosters	8	6	24
2025	Newcastle Knights	10	4	16
2026	Newcastle Knights	23	20	80
2027	Newcastle Knights			
	Totals	121	96	384
