= Charbel Tasipale =

Lebanon international rugby league footballer

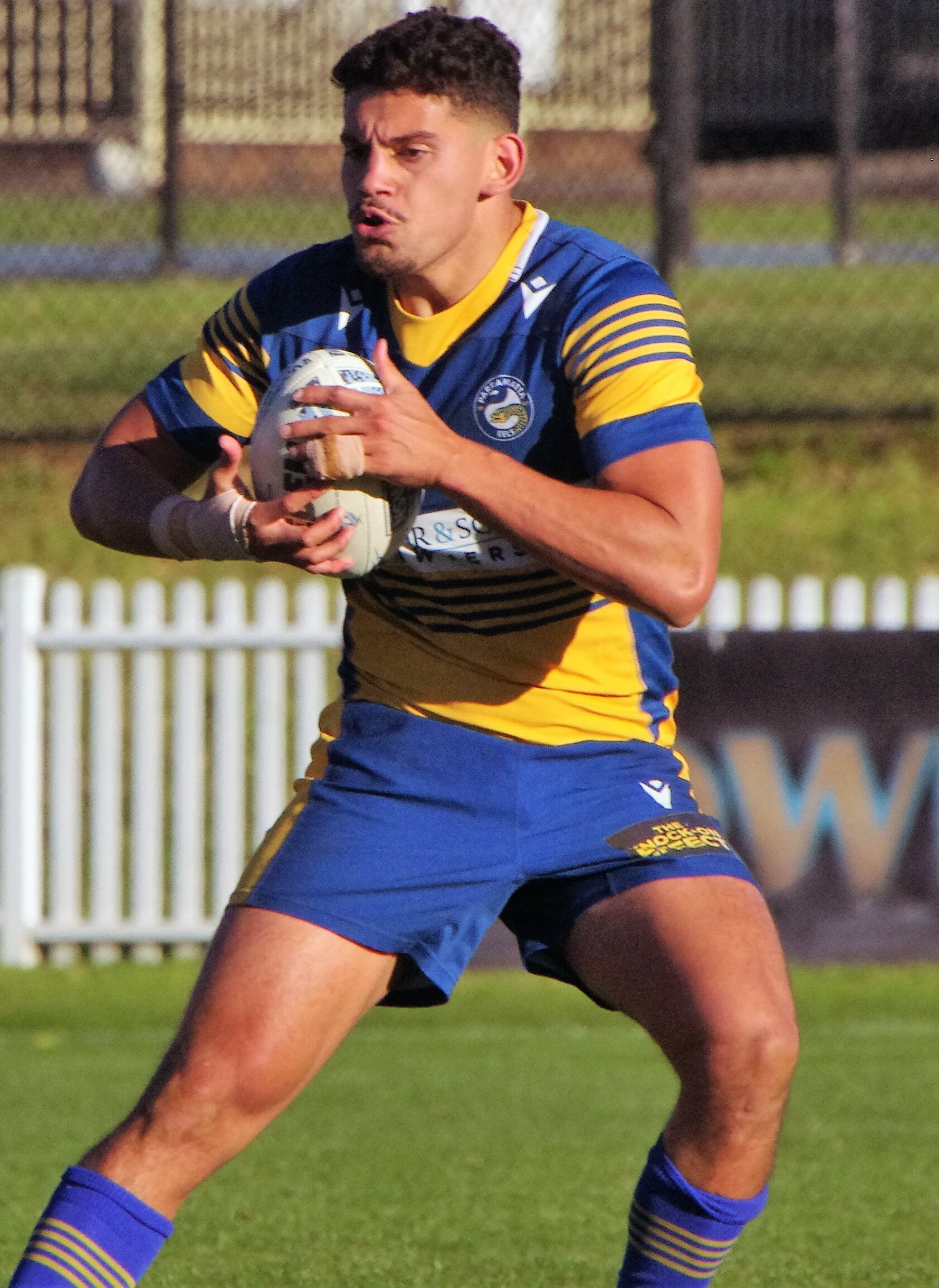

Personal information
- Full name: Charbel Tasipale
- Born: 24 February 2000 (age 26) Australia
- Height: 188 cm (6 ft 2 in)
- Weight: 101 kg (15 st 13 lb)

Playing information
- Position: Second-row, Centre
Club
Years	Team	Pld	T	G	FG	P
2023–24	Castleford Tigers	10	1	0	0	4
Representative
Years	Team	Pld	T	G	FG	P
2022–	Lebanon	4	2	0	0	8
- Source: As of 7 October 2026

Charbel Tasipale (born 24 February 2000) is a Lebanon international rugby league footballer who plays as a second-row forward or centre for the Newtown Jets in the NSW Cup. He was released from his contract with Castleford Tigers in June 2024, after returning home on compassionate grounds.

He has previously played for the Parramatta Eels and the Newtown Jets in the NSW Cup.

== Background ==
Tasipale was born in Australia to a Lebanese mother and a Samoan father from New Zealand.

== Club career ==
=== Parramatta Eels ===
Tasipale came through the youth system at the Parramatta Eels, playing in the Jersey Flegg Cup side in 2020 and 2021. He progressed into the Eels NSW Cup side in 2021, featuring in 9 games and scoring 1 try.

=== Newtown Jets ===
In 2022 he joined the Cronulla-Sutherland Sharks, and featured in 13 games and scoring 4 tries for their feeder team, the Newtown Jets in the 2022 NSW Cup.

=== Castleford Tigers ===
On 26 July 2023, Tasipale joined up with Super League side Castleford Tigers, signing a one-and-a-half-year deal with the option of a further year. He made his Super League debut for the Tigers on 4 August against Huddersfield. He scored his first try for Castleford against Wakefield Trinity in his second game for the club. Tasipale said that joining amidst a relegation battle and coaching changes was overwhelming; "I haven't been in situations like this before in my footy career but all the boys got around each other and we've been in good spirits."

On 24 Jun 24 it was announced that he had parted with Castleford Tigers by mutual consent.

=== Western Suburbs Magpies ===
Tasipale played his first game in the NSW cup for Western Suburbs Magpies on Sunday 14 July 2024. The Magpies beat the Sydney Roosters 44–4.

== International career ==
Tasipale was named in Junior Kiwis squads to face the Australian Schoolboys side.

He played for the Cedars at the 2019 Rugby League World Cup 9s.

In 2022 Tasipale was named in the Lebanon squad for the 2021 Rugby League World Cup. He made his international debut in October 2022 against New Zealand in Warrington. In the third group stage match at the 2021 Rugby League World Cup, Tasipale scored two tries for Lebanon in a 74–12 victory over Jamaica.
