= Khaled Rajab =

Lebanon international rugby league footballer

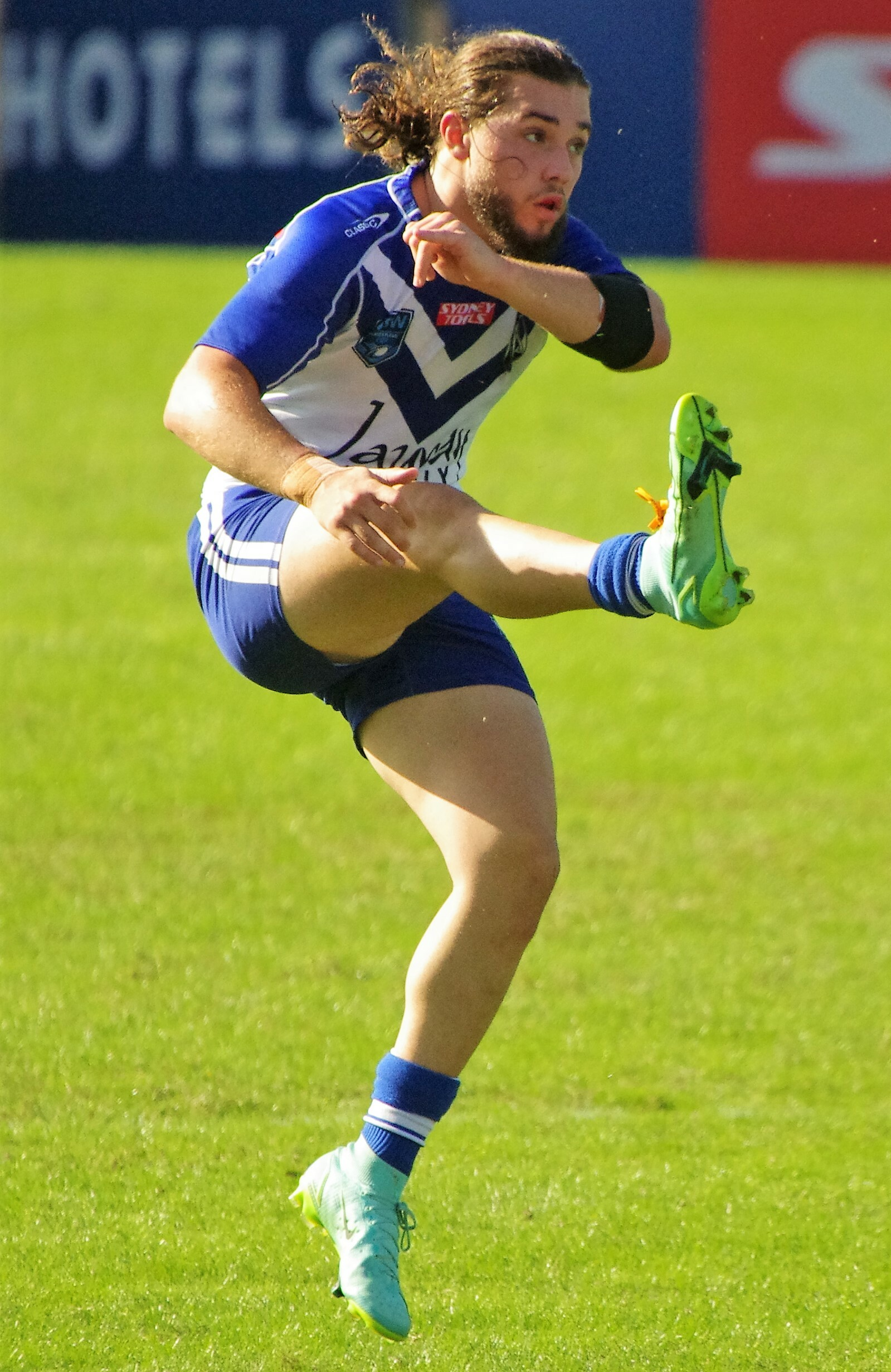

Personal information
- Born: 26 February 2002 (age 24) Bankstown, New South Wales, Australia
- Height: 179 cm (5 ft 10 in)
- Weight: 85 kg (13 st 5 lb)

Playing information
- Position: Five-eighth, Fullback
Club
Years	Team	Pld	T	G	FG	P
2023	Canterbury Bulldogs	4	0	0	0	0
Representative
Years	Team	Pld	T	G	FG	P
2022–	Lebanon	5	1	0	0	4
- Source: As of 24 October 2026

Khaled Rajab (Arabic: خالد رجب; born 26 February 2002) is a Lebanon international rugby league footballer who plays as a five-eighth or fullback for the Newtown Jets in the NSW Cup.

Rajab previously played for the Canterbury-Bankstown Bulldogs where he made his National Rugby League (NRL) debut.

== Background ==
Rajab was born in New South Wales, Australia. He is Muslim and of Lebanese descent. Rajab played his junior football for Bankstown Sports, whom he joined as a four-year-old. Rajab graduated from Al Noori Muslim School in Greenacre in 2019.

== Playing career ==
Rajab played in every Canterbury junior rank, including Harold Matthews Cup, Jersey Flegg, NSW Cup and was the SG Ball player of the year in 2021.

=== 2022 ===
In 2022, Rajab captained the Canterbury-Bankstown Bulldogs Jersey Flegg side. He also played in four games for the Bulldogs in the NSW Cup including the NSW Cup grand final loss against the Penrith Panthers NSW Cup team.

=== International career ===
In 2022, Rajab was named in the Lebanon squad for the 2021 Rugby League World Cup.

Rajab made his international debut against Ireland in a 42–18 victory for Lebanon.

Rajab's impressive form on the international stage attracted considerable attention from Phil Gould and rugby league commentators, with Gould declaring on Twitter "I'm sure he will debut next year, probably at 7". Rajab said in response to the attention: "I heard about that tweet. Some of my mates sent it to me saying, ‘Look what Gus said about you’. I was shocked, I thought, ‘No way’," Rajab told The Daily Telegraph. "As a kid this is what you dream of. "For Gus to even mention I might have a chance to play NRL, I’m grateful. It makes me want to work harder to get that shot."

Rajab was included in the Top 30 for the 2023 season.

=== 2023 ===
Rajab began the NSW Cup season with 11 appearances, six try assists and three tries guiding the Bulldog's reserve grade squad to the top of the ladder.

Rajab was a late inclusion into the Canterbury team that faced the Sydney Roosters in round 15 at Central Coast Stadium, losing 25–24. Rajab came off the bench to replace Karl Oloapu in the last twenty minutes, achieving his National Rugby League first grade debut. Rajab played four games for Canterbury in the 2023 NRL season as the club finished 15th on the table.

=== 2024 ===
After beginning the season in Ron Massey Cup, Rajab signed with the Newtown club and made his debut in NSW Cup round 9 against St. George Illawarra, winning 26-10. On 29 September, Rajab played for Newtown in their 2024 NSW Cup Grand Final victory over North Sydney.
