= Michael Tannous =

Lebanon international rugby league footballer

Mikey Tannous
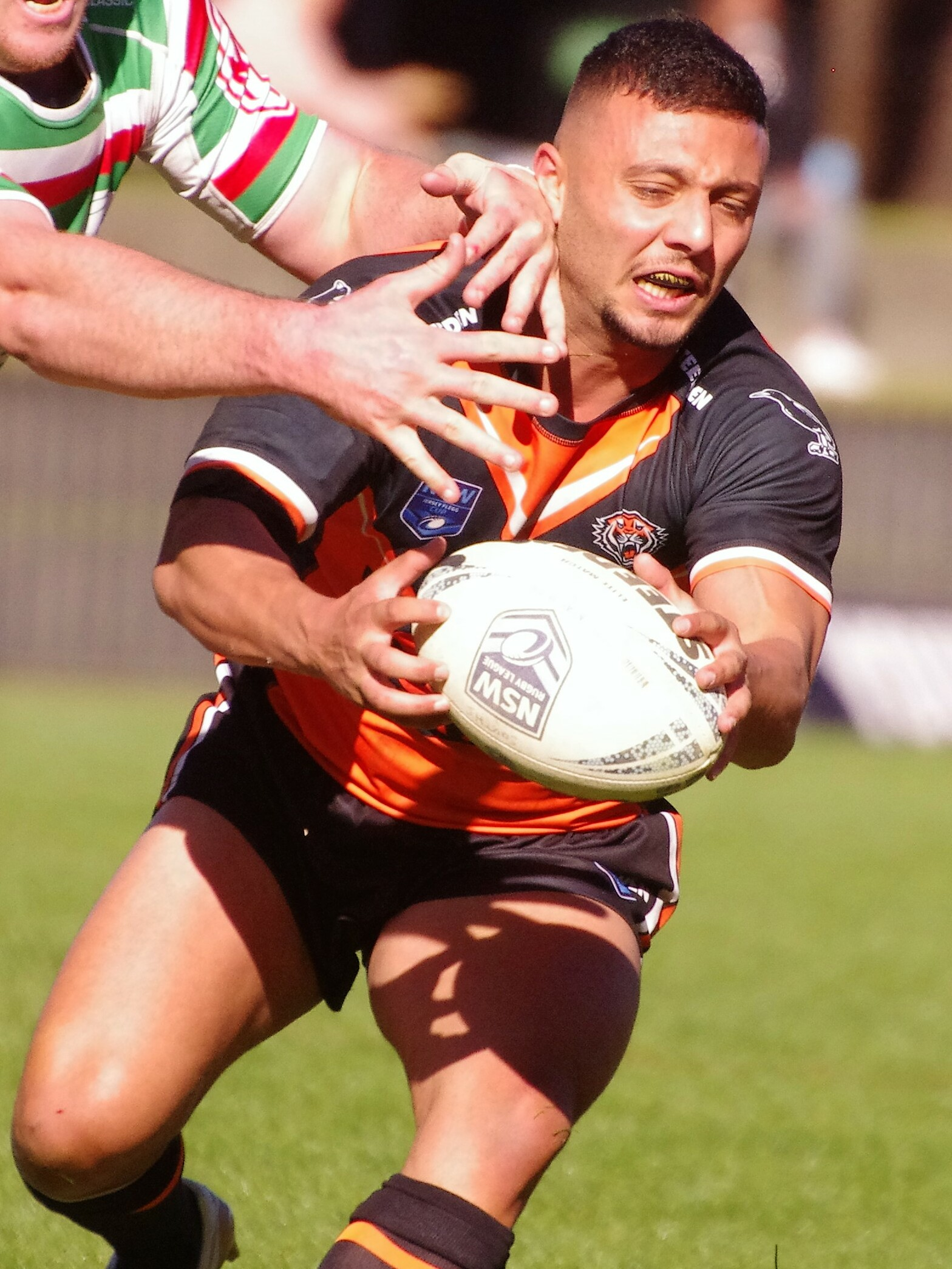

Personal information
- Full name: Michael Tannous
- Born: Australia

Playing information
- Position: Halfback, Five-eighth, Hooker
Club
Years	Team	Pld	T	G	FG	P
2024–	Wests Tigers	0	0	0	0	0
Representative
Years	Team	Pld	T	G	FG	P
2022–	Lebanon	4	1	0	0	4
- Source: As of 4 November 2022

Michael Tannous is a Lebanon international rugby league footballer who plays as a Halfback, Five-eighth and Hooker for the Wests Tigers in the National Rugby League (NRL).

== Background ==
Tannous is of Lebanese descent.

== Playing career ==
=== Club career ===
Tannous was in the West Tigers under-21 squad for the Jersey Flegg Cup in 2022 and 2023.

== International career ==
Tannous made his international debut for Lebanon in a 30-14 win against Malta in June 2022.

At the 2021 Rugby League World Cup, Tannous scored his first try for Lebanon in a warm-up match against Wales on 8 October 2022. Tannous made his World Cup debut on 16 October in a 34-12 loss to New Zealand. On 30 October, Tannous scored the opening try for Lebanon in their 74–12 win over Jamaica.
