= Jaxson Rahme =

Lebanon international rugby league footballer

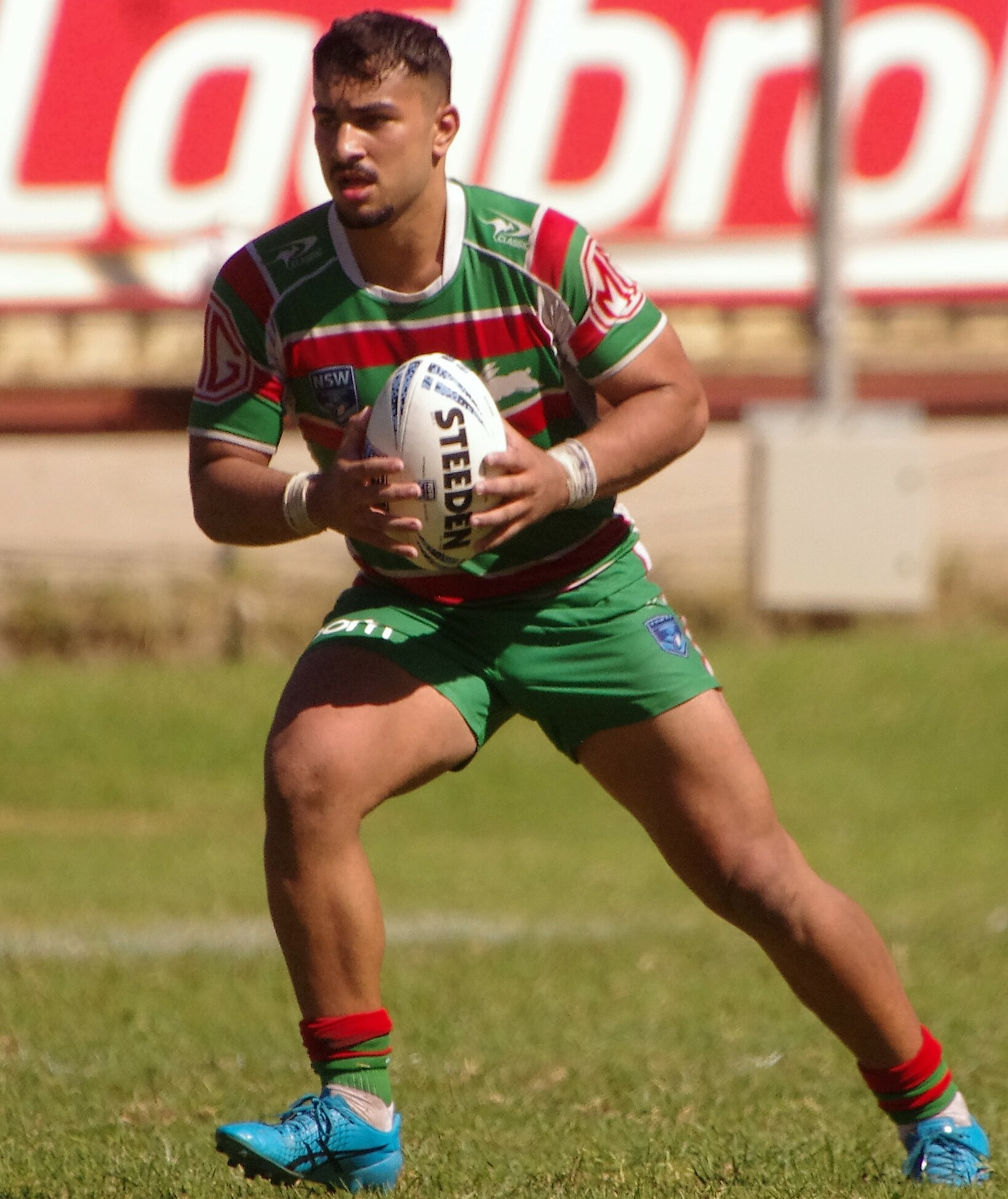

Personal information
- Full name: Jaxson Rahme
- Born: 4 December 2003 (age 22) Sydney, New South Wales, Australia
- Height: 1.85 m (6 ft 1 in)
- Weight: 100 kg (15 st 10 lb)

Playing information
- Position: Prop
Representative
Years	Team	Pld	T	G	FG	P
2022–	Lebanon	6	0	0	0	0
- Source: As of 1 November 2026

Jaxson Rahme (born 4 December 2003) is a Lebanon international rugby league footballer who plays as a second-row forward for the Wests Tigers in the NSW Cup.

== Background ==
Rahme is of Lebanese descent.

He was educated at Holy Cross College, Ryde.

He played for Holy Cross Ryde and the Dundas Shamrocks at junior level.

== Playing career ==
=== Club career ===
Rahme came through the youth system at the Balmain Tigers, playing in the Harold Matthews Cup in 2019 and the S.G. Ball Cup in 2020 and 2021.

In 2022 he moved to the South Sydney Rabbitohs, playing in their S.G. Ball Cup and their Jersey Flegg Cup side in 2022.

In 2024 he moved to the Wests Tigers

=== International career ===
Rahme was called up to the Australian Schoolboys side in 2021.

In 2022 he was named in the Lebanon squad for the 2021 Rugby League World Cup.

Rahme made his international debut in October 2022 against Ireland in Leigh.
