= Jalal Bazzaz =

Lebanon international rugby league footballer

Personal information
- Full name: Jalal Bazzaz
- Born: 24 August 2000 (age 26)
- Height: 180 cm (5 ft 11 in)
- Weight: 94 kg (14 st 11 lb)

Playing information
- Position: Lock
Representative
| Years | Team | Pld | T | G | FG | P |
|---|---|---|---|---|---|---|
| 2019– | Lebanon | 8 | 0 | 0 | 0 | 0 |
- Source: As of 6 November 2026

Jalal Bazzaz is a Lebanon international rugby league footballer who last played as a lock forward for the St George Illawarra Dragons in the NSW Cup.

== Career ==
Bazzaz made his international debut for Lebanon in their 56–14 loss to Fiji in the 2019 Pacific Test.
