= Brad Morkos =

Lebanon international rugby league footballer

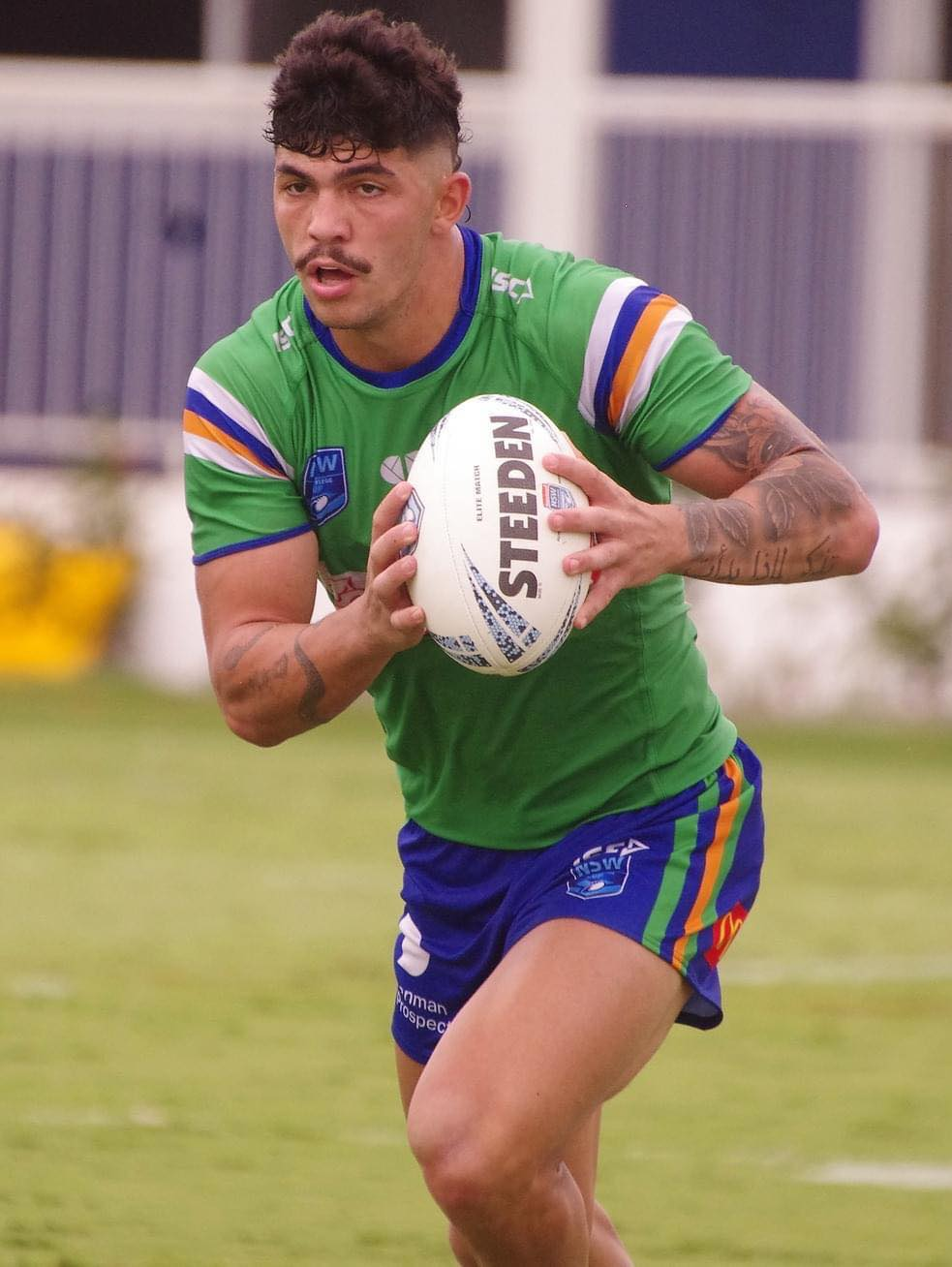

Personal information
- Full name: Brandon Morkos
- Born: 27 February 2003 (age 23)
- Height: 187 cm (6 ft 2 in)
- Weight: 93 kg (14 st 9 lb)

Playing information
- Position: Centre, Fullback
Club
Years	Team	Pld	T	G	FG	P
2027–	Perth Bears	0	0	0	0	0
Representative
Years	Team	Pld	T	G	FG	P
2022–	Lebanon	4	1	0	0	4
- Source: As of 7 October 2026

Brad Morkos (born 27 February 2003) is a Lebanon international rugby league footballer who plays as a centre for the Perth Bears in the NRL.

== Playing career ==
=== Early career ===
Morkos played his junior football for the Illawarra Steelers and was selected for the Australian Schoolboys before being signed by the Canberra Raiders on a three-year NRL deal in 2021.

=== 2022 ===
Morkos played for the NSW U19s in June playing in the centres in a 32-4 win for the NSW U19s.

Morkos made his international debut for Lebanon in their 34-12 loss to New Zealand at the 2021 Rugby League World Cup in October.

== Post NRL ==
In 2023 Morkos walked away from the NRL in order to return home. In 2024, Morkos was playing in Albion Park but had aspirations to join the MMA.
