= List of Fiji national rugby league team results =

The following list is a complete collection of results for the Fiji national rugby league team.

== All-Time Record ==
Up to date as of 23 October 2025

Country	Matches	Won	Drawn	Lost	Win %	For	Aga	Diff
American Samoa	1	1	0	0	100%	16	14	+2
Australia	7	0	0	7	0%	24	378	–354
Australian Aboriginies	1	1	0	0	100%	21	20	+1
Canada	1	1	0	0	100%	26	12	+14
Cook Islands	15	9	1	5	60%	449	251	+198
England	3	0	0	3	0%	22	146	–124
England Knights	1	1	0	0	100%	44	8	+36
France	2	2	0	0	100%	62	18	+44
Great Britain	1	0	0	1	0%	4	72	–68
Ireland	2	2	0	0	100%	62	28	+34
Italy	2	2	0	0	100%	98	14	+84
Lebanon	4	2	0	2	50%	118	118	0
Māori	1	0	0	1	0%	12	32	–20
New Zealand	2	1	0	1	50%	22	26	-4
New Zealand Residents	1	1	0	0	100%	34	16	+18
Niue	2	1	0	1	50%	34	38	–4
Papua New Guinea	16	5	0	11	31.25%	261	375	–114
Rotuma	1	1	0	0	100%	32	12	+20
Russia	1	1	0	0	100%	38	12	+26
Samoa	12	8	0	4	66.67%	274	184	+90
Scotland	2	1	0	1	50%	46	32	+14
South Africa	1	1	0	0	100%	52	6	+46
Tonga	13	5	1	7	38.46%	221	296	–75
United States	1	1	0	0	100%	58	12	+46
Wales	1	1	0	0	100%	72	6	+66
Total	94	48	2	44	51.06%	2,102	2,126	–24

== Results ==
=== 1990s ===
Date	Home	Score	Away	Competition	Location	Attendance
26 August 1992	Brisbane Combined	48–16	Fiji	1992 Bati tour of Queensland	(Australia) Lang Park, Brisbane	2,000
29 August 1992	Toowoomba	28–26	Fiji	1992 Bati tour of Queensland	(Australia) Athletic Oval, Toowoomba	Unknown
2 September 1992	Wide Bay	18–34	Fiji	1992 Bati tour of Queensland	(Australia) Eksdake Park, Maryborough	Unknown
18 October 1992	Western Samoa	32–18	Fiji	1992 Pacific Cup	(New Zealand) Carlaw Park, Auckland	Unknown
22 October 1992	Niue	14–0	Fiji	1992 Pacific Cup	(New Zealand) Carlaw Park, Auckland	Unknown
24 October 1992	Tonga	23–20	Fiji	1992 Pacific Cup	(New Zealand) Carlaw Park, Auckland	Unknown
26 October 1992	Fiji	58–6	Cook Islands	1992 Pacific Cup	(New Zealand) Carlaw Park, Auckland	Unknown
19 June 1993	Papua New Guinea	35–24	Fiji	Friendly	(Papua New Guinea) PNG Football Stadium, Port Moresby	Unknown
9 July 1994	Fiji	20–12	France	1994 France tour	(Fiji) ANZ National Stadium, Suva	5,000
21 October 1994	Western Samoa	16–14	Fiji	1994 Pacific Cup	(Fiji) ANZ National Stadium, Suva	Unknown
25 October 1994	Fiji	19–14	Cook Islands	1994 Pacific Cup	(Fiji) ANZ National Stadium, Suva	Unknown
28 October 1994	Fiji	32–12	Rotuma	1994 Pacific Cup	(Fiji) ANZ National Stadium, Suva	Unknown
2 November 1994	Fiji	16–14	American Samoa	1994 Pacific Cup	(Fiji) ANZ National Stadium, Suva	Unknown
9 November 1994	Fiji	21–20	Australian Aborigines	1994 Pacific Cup	(Fiji) ANZ National Stadium, Suva	Unknown
12 November 1994	Tonga	24–11	Fiji	1994 Pacific Cup	(Fiji) ANZ National Stadium, Suva	Unknown
8 October 1995	Fiji	52–6	South Africa	1995 World Cup	(England) Cougar Park, Keighley	4,845
11 October 1995	England	46–0	Fiji	1995 World Cup	(England) Central Park, Wigan	26,263
14 October 1995	Australia	66–0	Fiji	1995 World Cup	(England) Kirklees Stadium, Huddersfield	7,127
3 July 1996	Fiji	14–8	Cook Islands	Friendly	(New Zealand) Mount Smart Stadium, Auckland	Unknown
6 July 1996	Fiji	34–16	New Zealand Residents	Friendly	(Fiji) Prince Charles Park, Nadi	Unknown
5 October 1996	Fiji	4–72	Great Britain	1996 Lions tour	(Fiji) Prince Charles Park, Nadi	5,000
11 May 1997	Cook Islands	22–14	Fiji	1997 Pacific Cup	(New Zealand) Carlaw Park, Auckland	Unknown
13 May 1997	Māori	32–12	Fiji	1997 Pacific Cup	(New Zealand) Carlaw Park, Auckland	Unknown
15 May 1997	Tonga	14–14	Niue	1997 Pacific Cup	(New Zealand) Carlaw Park, Auckland	Unknown
18 May 1997	Fiji	22–20	Tonga	1997 Pacific Cup	(New Zealand) Carlaw Park, Auckland	Unknown
1 July 1998	Tonga	14–22	Fiji	Friendly	(Tonga) Teufaiva Sport Stadium, Nukuʻalofa	Unknown
18 July 1998	Fiji	14–16	Papua New Guinea	Three match series friendly	(Fiji) Prince Charles Park, Nadi	Unknown
22 July 1998	Papua New Guinea	34–12	Fiji	Three match series friendly	(Papua New Guinea) Danny Leahy Oval, Goroka	Unknown
26 July 1998	Papua New Guinea	10–14	Fiji	Three match series friendly	(Papua New Guinea) PNG Football Stadium, Port Moresby	Unknown
28 July 1999	Fiji	10–6	Samoa	Three match series friendly	(Fiji) ANZ National Stadium, Suva	Unknown
31 July 1999	Fiji	22–26	Samoa	Three match series friendly	(Fiji) ANZ National Stadium, Suva	Unknown
4 August 1999	Fiji	30–4	Samoa	Three match series friendly	(Fiji) ANZ National Stadium, Suva	Unknown

=== 2000s ===
Date	Home	Score	Away	Competition	Location	Attendance
27 May 2000	Tonga	23–20	Fiji	Two match series friendly	(Tonga) Teufaiva Sport Stadium, Nukuʻalofa	Unknown
3 June 2000	Fiji	10–6	Tonga	Two match series friendly	(Fiji) ANZ National Stadium, Suva	Unknown
29 October 2000	Fiji	38–12	Russia	2000 World Cup	(England) Craven Park, Kingston-upon-Hull	2,187
1 November 2000	Australia	66–8	Fiji	2000 World Cup	(England) Gateshead International Stadium, Gateshead	4,197
4 November 2000	England	66–10	Fiji	2000 World Cup	(England) Headingley Rugby Stadium, Leeds	10,052
17 August 2004	Fiji	24–36	Cook Islands	Two match series friendly	(New Caledonia) Stade Rivière Salée, Nouméa	Unknown
27 August 2004	Fiji	14–22	Cook Islands	Two match series friendly	(New Caledonia) Stade Rivière Salée, Nouméa	Unknown
17 October 2004	Fiji	6–56	Tonga	2004 Pacific Cup	(New Zealand) North Harbour Stadium, Auckland	Unknown
21 October 2004	Cook Islands	20–12	Fiji	2004 Pacific Cup	(New Zealand) North Harbour Stadium, Auckland	Unknown
23 October 2004	Fiji	34–24	Niue	2004 Pacific Cup	(New Zealand) North Harbour Stadium, Auckland	Unknown
23 February 2006	Fiji	26–4	Samoa	2006 Pacific Cup	(New Zealand) Mount Smart Stadium, Auckland	2,000
26 February 2006	Fiji	40–16	Cook Islands	2006 Pacific Cup	(New Zealand) Waitemata Stadium, Henderson	2,000
5 March 2006	Tonga	22–4	Fiji	2006 Pacific Cup	(New Zealand) Waitemata Stadium, Henderson	2,000
29 September 2006	Samoa	30–28	Fiji	2008 World Cup Pacific Qualifiers	(Australia) Campbelltown Sports Stadium, Leumeah	3,013
4 October 2006	Fiji	30–28	Tonga	2008 World Cup Pacific Qualifiers	(Australia) Western Weekender Stadium, Sydney	3,813
7 October 2006	Fiji	40–4	Cook Islands	2008 World Cup Pacific Qualifiers	(Australia) Penrith Stadium, Penrith	1,713
25 January 2007	Fiji	50–12	Cook Islands	Friendly	(Australia) Coffs Harbour International Stadium, Coffs Harbour	Unknown
19 October 2007	Tonga	14–12	Fiji	Friendly	(Tonga) Teufaiva Sport Stadium, Nukuʻalofa	Unknown
1 November 2008	Fiji	42–6	France	2008 World Cup	(Australia) Wollongong Showground, Wollongong	9,213
5 November 2008	Scotland	18–16	Fiji	2008 World Cup	(Australia) Central Coast Stadium, Gosford	9,720
10 November 2008	Fiji	30–14	Ireland	2008 World Cup	(Australia) Robina Stadium, Robina	8,224
16 November 2008	Australia	24–18	Fiji	2008 World Cup	(Australia) Sydney Football Stadium, Sydney	15,855
27 June 2009	Fiji	18–16	(United Kingdom) Great Britain Amateurs	Two match series friendly	Unknown	Unknown
1 July 2009	Fiji	30–26	(United Kingdom) Great Britain Amateurs	Two match series friendly	Unknown	Unknown
22 July 2009	Papua New Guinea	54–10	Fiji	Two match series friendly	(Papua New Guinea) PNG Football Stadium, Port Moresby	Unknown
25 July 2009	Papua New Guinea	14–2	Fiji	Two match series friendly	(Papua New Guinea) PNG Football Stadium, Port Moresby	Unknown
24 October 2009	Cook Islands	24–22	Fiji	2009 Pacific Cup	(Papua New Guinea) PNG Football Stadium, Port Moresby	3,269
31 October 2009	Fiji	26–12	Tonga	2009 Pacific Cup	(Papua New Guinea) PNG Football Stadium, Port Moresby	2,000

=== 2010s ===
Date	Home	Score	Away	Competition	Location	Attendance
2 June 2010	Samoa	4–24	Fiji	Friendly	(Samoa) Apia	Unknown
26 October 2011	Papua New Guinea	26–12	Fiji	Friendly	(Papua New Guinea) Mount Hagen	10,000
2 November 2011	Papua New Guinea	0–26	Fiji	Friendly	(Papua New Guinea) PNG Football Stadium, Port Moresby	15,000
19 October 2012	Fiji	4–34	Lebanon	Friendly	(Australia) Sydney	Unknown
19 October 2013	Rochdale Hornets	0–78	Fiji	Friendly	(England) Spotland Stadium, Rochdale	Unknown
28 October 2013	Fiji	32–14	Ireland	2013 World Cup	(England) Spotland Stadium, Rochdale	8,872
2 November 2013	Australia	34–2	Fiji	2013 World Cup	(England) Langtree Park, St Helens	14,137
9 November 2013	England	34–12	Fiji	2013 World Cup	(England) KC Stadium, Kingston-upon-Hull	25,114
17 November 2013	Samoa	4–22	Fiji	2013 World Cup	(England) Halliwell Jones Stadium, Warrington	12,766
23 November 2013	Australia	64–0	Fiji	2013 World Cup	(England) Wembley Stadium, London	67,545
3 May 2014	Fiji	16–32	Samoa	Friendly	(Australia) Sydney	9,063
19 October 2014	Fiji	40–26	Lebanon	Hayne–Mannah Cup	(Australia) Sydney	Unknown
2 May 2015	Papua New Guinea	10–22	Fiji	Friendly	(Australia) Robina Stadium, Robina	Unknown
7 May 2016	Papua New Guinea	24–22	Fiji	Friendly	(Australia) Parramatta Stadium, Parramatta	Unknown
20 August 2016	Canada	12–26	Fiji	Friendly	(United States) Aloha Stadium, Honolulu	Unknown
8 October 2016	Samoa	18–20	Fiji	Friendly	(Samoa) Apia	Unknown
6 May 2017	Tonga	26–24	Fiji	Friendly	(Australia) Campbelltown Sports Stadium, Leumeah	18,271
14 October 2017	Fiji	0–10	Papua New Guinea	Friendly	(Fiji) ANZ National Stadium, Suva	Unknown
14 October 2017	Fiji	0–18	Australia	Friendly	(Fiji) ANZ National Stadium, Suva	Unknown
28 October 2017	Fiji	58–12	United States	2017 World Cup	(Australia) Willows Sports Complex, Townsville	5,103
5 November 2017	Fiji	72–6	Wales	2017 World Cup	(Australia) Willows Sports Complex, Townsville	7,732
10 November 2017	Fiji	38–10	Italy	2017 World Cup	(Australia) Canberra Stadium, Canberra	6,733
18 November 2017	New Zealand	2–4	Fiji	2017 World Cup	(New Zealand) Wellington Regional Stadium, Wellington	12,713
24 November 2017	Australia	54–6	Fiji	2017 World Cup	(Australia) Lang Park, Brisbane	22,073
23 June 2018	Papua New Guinea	26–14	Fiji	Friendly	(Australia) Campbelltown Sports Stadium, Leumeah	17,802
22 June 2019	Fiji	58–14	Lebanon	Friendly	(Australia) Sydney	8,408
29 September 2019	Fiji	16–42	Lebanon	Friendly	(Australia) Sydney	1,200
2 November 2019	Samoa	18–44	Fiji	2019 Oceania Cup	(New Zealand) Eden Park, Auckland	25,257
9 November 2019	Fiji	22–20	Papua New Guinea	2019 Oceania Cup	(New Zealand) Rugby League Park, Christchurch	8,875

=== 2020s ===
Date	Home	Score	Away	Competition	Location	Attendance
25 June 2022	Papua New Guinea	24–14	Fiji	Friendly	(Australia) Campbelltown Sports Stadium, Leumeah	10,720
7 October 2022	England	50–0	Fiji	Friendly	(England) AJ Bell Stadium, Salford	6,849
15 October 2022	Australia	42–8	Fiji	2021 World Cup	(England) Headingley Rugby Stadium, Leeds	13,366
22 October 2022	Fiji	60–4	Italy	2021 World Cup	(England) Kingston Park, Newcastle upon Tyne	3,675
29 October 2022	Fiji	30–14	Scotland	2021 World Cup	(England) Kingston Park, Newcastle upon Tyne	6,736
5 November 2022	New Zealand	24–18	Fiji	2021 World Cup	(England) MKM Stadium, Kingston-upon-Hull	7,080
22 October 2023	Fiji	22–18	Cook Islands	2023 Pacific Bowl	(Papua New Guinea) PNG Football Stadium, Port Moresby	7,133
29 October 2023	Papua New Guinea	16–43	Fiji	2023 Pacific Bowl	(Papua New Guinea) PNG Football Stadium, Port Moresby	14,546
5 November 2023	Fiji	12–32	Papua New Guinea	2023 Pacific Bowl	(Papua New Guinea) PNG Football Stadium, Port Moresby	14,809
19 October 2024	Fiji	10–22	Papua New Guinea	2024 Pacific Bowl	(Fiji) ANZ National Stadium, Suva	7,581
26 October 2024	Fiji	56–6	Cook Islands	2024 Pacific Bowl	(Fiji) ANZ National Stadium, Suva	5,943
18 October 2025	Fiji	44–24	Cook Islands	2025 Pacific Bowl	(Papua New Guinea) PNG Football Stadium, Port Moresby	Unknown
1 November 2025	Papua New Guinea	50–18	Fiji	2025 Pacific Bowl	(Papua New Guinea) PNG Football Stadium, Port Moresby	12,046
18 October 2026	Fiji	40–12	Cook Islands	2026 World Cup	(Australia) Newcastle International Sports Centre, Newcastle	10,604
25 October 2026	Australia	36–22	Fiji	2026 World Cup	(Australia) Lang Park, Brisbane	41,108
31 October 2026	New Zealand	78–0	Fiji	2026 World Cup	(Australia) Robina Stadium, Gold Coast	23,659

== See also ==
- Fiji National Rugby League Competition
- Fiji women's national rugby league team
- Fiji National Rugby League
- Rugby league in Fiji
