= 2026 Men's Rugby League World Cup statistics =

Rugby league competition statistics

This article lists the statistics for the 2026 Men's Rugby League World Cup which was played from 15 October to 15 November 2026. This includes statistical tables for each of the eight participating teams. The team tables are best viewed on a larger screen.

For an explanation of the acronyms and abbreviations are used in the tables, please see the key to acronyms section at the end of this article.

== Final standings ==
Pos	Grp	Team	Pld	W	D	L	PF	PA	PD	Pts	Final result
1	A	Australia (H)	5	5	0	0	202	74	+128	10	Champions
2	A	New Zealand (H)	5	3	0	2	228	82	+146	6	Runners-up
3	C	Tonga	4	3	0	1	96	64	+32	6	Eliminated in semi-finals
4	B	Samoa	4	2	0	2	172	74	+98	4	Eliminated in semi-finals
5	B	England	3	2	0	1	128	42	+86	4	Eliminated in pool stage
6	C	Papua New Guinea (H)	3	1	0	2	60	116	−56	2	Eliminated in pool stage
7	B	Lebanon	3	1	0	2	42	98	−56	2	Eliminated in pool stage
8	A	Fiji	3	1	0	2	62	126	−64	2	Eliminated in pool stage
9	A	Cook Islands	3	0	0	3	34	188	−154	0	Eliminated in pool stage
10	C	France	3	0	0	3	24	184	−160	0	Eliminated in pool stage

Updated to match(es) played on 16 November 2026. Source: World Cup 2026
(H) Hosts

== Tournament statistics ==
As of 17 November 2026, after the eighteenth match, the Final (Australia v New Zealand).

=== Individual ===
==== Tournament tallies ====
===== Tries =====
Qualification: 2 tries

Rank	Player	Team	Mat	Tries
1	Casey McLean	New Zealand	5	9
1	Tom Trbojevic	Australia	5	9
1	Jack Bostock	Australia	5	9
4	Sualauvi Fa'alogo	Samoa	4	6
5	Dom Young	England	3	5
5	Sosefo Fifita	Tonga	4	5
5	Reece Walsh	Australia	4	5
8	Hamiso Tabuai-Fidow	Samoa	4	4
9	Shawn Blore	Samoa	2	3
9	Herbie Farnworth	England	3	3
9	Esom Ioka	Cook Islands	2	3
9	Jamayne Isaako	New Zealand	5	3
9	Semi Valemei	Fiji	3	3
9	AJ Brimson	England	3	3
9	Ronaldo Mulitalo	New Zealand	4	3
9	Keano Kini	New Zealand	3	3
9	Mikey Lewis	England	2	3
9	Abbas Miski	Lebanon	3	3
9	Brian To'o	Samoa	4	3
9	Jacob Preston	Australia	5	3
9	Stephen Crichton	Samoa	4	3
9	Izack Tago	Samoa	4	3
23	Kalyn Ponga	New Zealand	3	2
23	Toluta'u Koula	Tonga	4	2
23	Haumole Olakau'atu	Tonga	4	2
23	Bailey Biondi-Odo	Papua New Guinea	3	2
23	Taane Milne	Fiji	3	2
23	Solomone Saukuru	Fiji	3	2
23	Ben Ioelu	Samoa	4	2
23	Gairo Voro	Papua New Guinea	3	2
23	Matty Ashton	England	2	2
23	Tanner Stowers-Smith	New Zealand	1	2
23	Kotoni Staggs	Australia	5	2
23	Tino Fa'asuamaleaui	Australia	5	2
23	Guillermo Aispuro-Bichet	France	3	2
23	Sione Katoa	Tonga	1	2
23	Ronald Volkman	Samoa	3	2
23	Briton Nikora	New Zealand	4	2
23	Dane Gagai	New Zealand	4	2
23	Jahrome Hughes	New Zealand	5	2
23	Xavier Willison	New Zealand	5	2
23	Charnze Nicoll-Klokstad	New Zealand	2	2
23	Bradman Best	Australia	4	2
23	Liam Martin	Australia	4	2

===== Try assists =====
Qualification: 2 try assists

Rank	Player	Team	Mat	Try assists
1	Kodi Nikorima	New Zealand	5	7
2	Chanel Harris-Tavita	Samoa	3	6
2	Jahrome Hughes	New Zealand	5	6
2	Cameron Munster	Australia	4	6
2	Reece Walsh	Australia	4	6
6	Jarome Luai	Samoa	4	5
6	Kurt Donoghoe	Fiji	3	5
6	George Williams	England	3	5
6	Sualauvi Fa'alogo	Samoa	4	5
6	Tom Dearden	Australia	5	5
11	Brandon Wakeham	Fiji	3	4
11	Tuimoala Lolohea	Tonga	4	4
11	Bradman Best	Australia	4	4
14	Ben Ioelu	Samoa	4	3
14	AJ Brimson	England	3	3
14	Harry Smith	England	3	3
14	Charnze Nicoll-Klokstad	New Zealand	2	3
14	Te Maire Martin	New Zealand	2	3
14	Hugo Savala	England	3	3
14	James Tedesco	Australia	2	3
14	Toluta'u Koula	Tonga	4	3
14	Kalyn Ponga	New Zealand	3	3
14	Hamiso Tabuai-Fidow	Samoa	4	3
24	Isaiya Katoa	Tonga	3	2
24	Edwin Ipape	Papua New Guinea	2	2
24	Isaiah Papali'i	New Zealand	4	2
24	Gairo Voro	Papua New Guinea	3	2
24	Tom Trbojevic	Australia	5	2
24	Alex Conti	Lebanon	3	2
24	Lehi Hopoate	Tonga	4	2
24	Erin Clark	New Zealand	5	2
24	Kotoni Staggs	Australia	5	2
24	Jacob Preston	Australia	5	2
24	Harry Grant	Australia	4	2

===== Points =====
Qualification: 10 points

Rank	Player	Team	Mat	Tries	Goals	DG	Points
1	Jamayne Isaako	New Zealand	5	3	38	0	88
2	Stephen Crichton	Samoa	4	3	14	0	40
3	Hugo Savala	England	3	0	19	0	38
4	Casey McLean	New Zealand	5	9	0	0	36
4	Tom Trbojevic	Australia	5	9	0	0	36
4	Jack Bostock	Australia	5	9	0	0	36
7	Reece Walsh	Australia	4	5	5	0	30
7	Cameron Munster	Australia	4	0	15	0	30
9	Sualauvi Fa'alogo	Samoa	4	6	0	0	24
9	Rhyse Martin	Papua New Guinea	3	1	10	0	24
9	Isaiya Katoa	Tonga	3	0	12	0	24
12	Dom Young	England	3	5	0	0	20
12	Sosefo Fifita	Tonga	4	5	0	0	20
14	Alex Conti	Lebanon	3	1	7	0	18
14	Brandon Wakeham	Fiji	3	0	9	0	18
16	Hamiso Tabuai-Fidow	Samoa	4	4	0	0	16
16	Sam Walker	Australia	1	1	6	0	16
16	Ronald Volkman	Samoa	3	2	4	0	16
19	Shawn Blore	Samoa	2	3	0	0	12
19	Herbie Farnworth	England	3	3	0	0	12
19	Esom Ioka	Cook Islands	2	3	0	0	12
19	Semi Valemei	Fiji	3	3	0	0	12
19	AJ Brimson	England	3	3	0	0	12
19	Mikey Lewis	England	2	3	0	0	12
19	Ronaldo Mulitalo	New Zealand	4	3	0	0	12
19	Keano Kini	New Zealand	3	3	0	0	12
19	Abbas Miski	Lebanon	3	3	0	0	12
19	Brian To'o	Samoa	4	3	0	0	12
19	Izack Tago	Samoa	4	3	0	0	12
19	Jacob Preston	Australia	5	3	0	0	12

===== Goal kicking =====
Qualification: 1 attempt

Rank	Player	Team	Mat	Goals	Attempts	%
1	Jamayne Isaako	New Zealand	5	38	39	97.44%
2	Hugo Savala	England	3	19	21	90.48%
3	Cameron Munster	Australia	4	15	22	68.18%
4	Stephen Crichton	Samoa	4	14	21	66.67%
5	Isaiya Katoa	Tonga	3	12	14	85.71%
6	Rhyse Martin	Papua New Guinea	3	10	10	100.00%
7	Brandon Wakeham	Fiji	3	9	11	81.82%
8	Alex Conti	Lebanon	3	7	9	77.78%
9	Sam Walker	Australia	1	6	7	85.71%
10	Reece Walsh	Australia	4	5	8	62.50%
11	Ronald Volkman	Samoa	3	4	6	66.67%
12	Tuimoala Lolohea	Tonga	4	3	3	100.00%
12	Valentine Holmes	Cook Islands	2	3	4	75.00%
12	Arthur Mourgue	France	3	3	4	75.00%
15	Chanel Harris-Tavita	Samoa	3	2	8	25.00%
16	Ethan Strange	Australia	2	1	1	100.00%
16	Harry Smith	England	3	1	2	50.00%
16	Paul Alamoti	Tonga	2	1	4	25.00%
19	Latrell Mitchell	Australia	1	0	1	00.00%

===== Offloads =====
Qualification: 4 offloads

Rank	Player	Team	Mat	Offloads
1	Max King	England	3	11
1	Herbie Farnworth	England	3	11
1	Isaiah Papali'i	New Zealand	4	11
4	Nixon Putt	Papua New Guinea	3	9
4	Taane Milne	Fiji	3	9
4	Joseph Tapine	New Zealand	5	9
7	Kai Pearce-Paul	England	3	8
7	Alex Twal	Lebanon	3	8
9	Tony Francis	Lebanon	3	7
9	Junior Paulo	Samoa	4	7
9	Bradman Best	Australia	4	7
12	Jordan Samrani	Lebanon	3	6
12	Francis Manuleleua	Samoa	4	6
12	Jacob Kiraz	Lebanon	3	6
12	Stefano Utoikamanu	Tonga	4	6
12	Erin Clark	New Zealand	5	6
12	Francis Molo	Samoa	4	6
12	Cameron Munster	Australia	4	6
19	Hugo Savala	England	3	5
19	Jaxson Rahme	Lebanon	3	5
19	Julian Bousquet	France	2	5
19	Haumole Olakau'atu	Tonga	4	5
19	Casey McLean	New Zealand	5	5
19	Charnze Nicoll-Klokstad	New Zealand	2	5
19	Briton Nikora	New Zealand	4	5
19	Stephen Crichton	Samoa	4	5
19	Connelly Lemuelu	Samoa	4	5
19	Jacob Preston	Australia	5	5
19	Tom Trbojevic	Australia	5	5
30	Waqa Blake	Fiji	3	4
30	Dom Young	England	3	4
30	Sam Walters	England	3	4
30	Makahesi Makatoa	Cook Islands	3	4
30	Moustafa Dirani	Lebanon	3	4
30	Arthur Mourgue	France	3	4
30	Addin Fonua-Blake	Tonga	4	4
30	Lehi Hopoate	Tonga	4	4
30	Salesi Foketi	Tonga	4	4
30	Siua Wong	Tonga	4	4
30	Xavier Willison	New Zealand	5	4
30	Ata Mariota	Samoa	3	4
30	Liam Martin	Australia	4	4

===== Tackles made =====
Qualification: 70 tackles made

Rank	Player	Team	Mat	Tackles
1	Jeremy Marshall-King	New Zealand	5	157
2	Harry Grant	Australia	4	155
3	Mason Teague	Cook Islands	3	148
4	Salesi Foketi	Tonga	4	145
5	Isaiah Papali'i	New Zealand	4	139
6	Haumole Olakau'atu	Tonga	4	137
6	Jacob Preston	Australia	5	137
6	Isaah Yeo	Australia	4	137
9	Erin Clark	New Zealand	5	115
10	Tino Fa'asuamaleaui	Australia	5	113
11	Siua Wong	Tonga	4	112
12	Caleb Navale	Fiji	3	109
12	Alex Twal	Lebanon	3	109
12	Mathieu Jussaume	France	3	109
12	Cameron Murray	Australia	4	109
16	Nixon Putt	Papua New Guinea	3	108
16	Jaxson Rahme	Lebanon	3	108
16	Ben Ioelu	Samoa	4	108
16	James Fisher-Harris	New Zealand	5	108
16	Liam Martin	Australia	4	108
21	Francis Manuleleua	Samoa	4	106
21	Patrick Carrigan	Australia	5	106
23	Jermaine McEwen	Samoa	4	105
23	Joseph Tapine	New Zealand	5	105
25	Xavier Willison	New Zealand	5	104
26	Rhyse Martin	Papua New Guinea	3	99
27	Benjamin Garcia	France	3	96
28	Kai Pearce-Paul	England	3	95
28	Moustafa Dirani	Lebanon	3	95
28	Connelly Lemuelu	Samoa	4	95
28	Reuben Cotter	Australia	5	95
32	Kodi Nikorima	New Zealand	5	94
32	Keaon Koloamatangi	Australia	5	93
33	Briton Nikora	New Zealand	4	91
34	Mathieu Cozza	France	3	90
34	Addin Fonua-Blake	Tonga	4	90
36	Sam Walters	England	3	88
36	Delahia Wigmore	Cook Islands	3	88
38	Liam Horne	Papua New Guinea	3	87
38	Tony Sukkar	Lebanon	3	87
38	Romain Navarrete	France	3	87
41	Jason Taumalolo	Tonga	4	86
42	Amir Bourouh	France	3	85
43	Rua Ngatikaura	Cook Islands	3	84
43	Stefano Utoikamanu	Tonga	4	84
43	Moses Leota	New Zealand	4	84
46	Cameron Munster	Australia	4	83
47	James Roumanos	Lebanon	3	82
48	Abbas Miski	Lebanon	3	80
49	Taane Milne	Fiji	3	79
49	Tom Dearden	Australia	5	79
51	Max King	England	3	78
52	Jacob Saifiti	Fiji	3	75
52	Tupou Francis	Lebanon	3	75
54	Luke Thompson	England	3	74
54	Davvy Moale	Cook Islands	3	74
56	Finley Glare	Papua New Guinea	3	72
57	Brandon Wakeham	Fiji	3	71
58	Francis Molo	Samoa	4	70
58	Junior Paulo	Samoa	4	70

==== Match records ====
===== Try hattricks =====
Qualification: 3 tries in a match

Player	Team	Tries	Times	Date	Round	Opponent	Venue	Ref
Sualauvi Fa'alogo	Samoa	4	13' 36' 63' 67'	16 Oct 2026	1	France	CommBank Stadium	NRL
Casey McLean	New Zealand	4	8' 25' 56' 62'	31 Oct 2026	3	Fiji	Cbus Super Stadium	NRL
Jack Bostock	Australia	3	19' 56' 75'	15 Oct 2026	1	New Zealand	Allianz Stadium	NRL
Herbie Farnworth	England	3	26' 34' 39'	24 Oct 2026	2	France	HBF Park	NRL
Dominic Young	England	3	22' 45' 63'	24 Oct 2026	2	France	HBF Park	NRL
Esom Ioka	Cook Islands	3	10' 14' 18'	25 Oct 2026	2	New Zealand	One NZ Stadium	NRL
Jamayne Isaako	New Zealand	3	1' 23' 73'	25 Oct 2026	2	Cook Islands	One NZ Stadium	NRL
Tom Trbojevic	Australia	3	47' 57' 62'	25 Oct 2026	2	Fiji	Suncorp Stadium	NRL
Semi Valemei	Fiji	3	17' 43' 69'	25 Oct 2026	2	Australia	Suncorp Stadium	NRL
Tom Trbojevic	Australia	3	17' 47' 57'	31 Oct 2026	3	Cook Islands	Queensland Country Bank Stadium	NRL
Jack Bostock	Australia	3	2' 44' 59'	31 Oct 2026	3	Cook Islands	Queensland Country Bank Stadium	NRL
Reece Walsh	Australia	3	31' 46' 65'	8 Nov 2026	SF	Samoa	Allianz Stadium	NRL

===== Goals in a match =====
Qualification: 5 goals in a match

Player	Team	Goals	Times	Missed	Date	Round	Opponent	Venue	Ref
Hugo Savala	England	13	23' 25' 27' 36' 38' 39' 49' 59' 63' 65' 66' 69' 77'	46'	24 Oct 2026	2	France	HBF Park	NRL
Jamayne Isaako	New Zealand	13	3' 8' 24' 28' 34' 39' 44' 50' 53' 58' 75' 76' 78'	66'	25 Oct 2026	2	Cook Islands	One NZ Stadium	NRL
Jamayne Isaako	New Zealand	13	3' 5' 10' 12' 21' 26' 30' 34' 58' 63' 66 74' 79'	—	31 Oct 2026	3	Fiji	Cbus Super Stadium	NRL
Stephen Crichton	Samoa	11	4' 6' 8' 19' 38' 44' 57' 71' 76' 78' 80'	14' 65' 69' 80'	16 Oct 2026	1	France	CommBank Stadium	NRL
Rhyse Martin	Papua New Guinea	7	8' 21' 31' 43' 49' 72' 74'	—	17 Oct 2026	1	Lebanon	Santos Stadium, Port Moresby	NRL
Isaiya Katoa	Tonga	7	24' 27' 39' 53' 57' 60' 75'	72'	17 Oct 2026	1	England	HBF Park, Perth	NRL
Brandon Wakeham	Fiji	6	7' 13' 30' 36' 48' 71'	38'	18 Oct 2026	1	Cook Islands	McDonald Jones Stadium	NRL
Sam Walker	Australia	6	9' 34' 54' 58' 63' 78	49'	25 Oct 2026	2	Fiji	Suncorp Stadium	NRL
Cameron Munster	Australia	6	8' 15' 38' 48' 67' 73'		8 Nov 2026	SF	Samoa	Allianz Stadium	NRL
Jamayne Isaako	New Zealand	5	5' 25' 38' 48' 61'	—	15 Oct 2026	1	Australia	Allianz Stadium	NRL
Cameron Munster	Australia	5	32' 46' 53' 56' 58'	49' 60'	31 Oct 2026	3	Cook Islands	Queensland Country Bank Stadium	NRL

== Injuries ==
The following injuries were incurred after the respective squads assembled and began training.

Player	Team	Type	Occurred			Impact	Replacement	Ref
Player	Team	Type	Where	Left Field	Date	Impact	Replacement	Ref
Morgan Smithies	England	Hamstring	Training	—	12–13 Oct 2026	Out of tournament	Kallum Watkins	
Marata Niukore	Cook Islands	Groin	Training	—	12–13 Oct 2026	Out of tournament	Brody Tamarua	
Kalyn Ponga	New Zealand	Fractured arm	In game	71'	15 Oct 2026	Surgery scheduled, remaining in camp		
Mitchell Moses	Australia	Calf, high-grade muscle tear	In game	41'	15 Oct 2026	Out of tournament	Ethan Strange	
Morgan Knowles	England	Calf	Training	—	15-16 Oct 2026	Missed Rounds 1 & 2	Round 3 return	
Deine Mariner	Samoa	Hamstring	In game	10'	16 Oct 2026	Missed Rounds 2 & 3	Semi-Final return	
Leo Darrelatour	France	Head injury assessment (no return)	In game	6'	16 Oct 2026	Missed Round 2.		
Latu Fainu	Tonga	Pectoral	In game		17 Oct 2026	Named on the bench in Round 2		
Isaiya Katoa	Tonga	Ankle	Aggravated in game	—	17 Oct 2026	Missed Round 2	Round 3 return	
Khaled Rajab	Lebanon	Hamstring	In game	14'	23 Oct 2026	Out of tournament	Shadi Hammoud	
Jack de Belin	Papua New Guinea	Broken ribs	In game	32'	24 Oct 2026	Out of tournament		
Latrell Siegwalt	France	Dislocated shoulder	In game	29'	24 Oct 2026	Out of tournament		
Esom Ioka	Cook Islands		In game	20'	25 Oct 2026	Out of tournament		
Apisai Koroisau	Fiji	Head injury assessment (no return)	In game	7'	31 Oct 2026	Did not finish last game	—	
Semi Valemei	Fiji	Head injury assessment (no return)	In game	34'	31 Oct 2026	Did not finish last game	—	
Ronald Philitoga	Fiji	Head injury assessment (no return)	In game	51'	31 Oct 2026	Did not finish last game	—	
Jacob Laban	New Zealand	Lower leg			25 Oct 2026	Out of tournament	Pheonix Crossland	
Chanel Harris-Tavita	England	Hamstring	In game	53'	1 Nov 2026	Missing Semi-Final		

== Discipline ==
The following players were sent to the sin bin, sent off, or charged by the match review committee.

Player	Team	Date	Rd	Opponent	Minute	Offence	Charge grade	Result	Record	Matches to serve	Misconduct on whom?
Kotoni Staggs	Australia	15 Oct 2026	1	NZL	(yellow card) 37'	Professional foul	—			0	
Latu Fainu	Tonga	23 Oct 2026	2	LEB	58'	High tackle - Careless	1		1st Offence	0	Alex Conti
Robert Derby	Papua New Guinea	24 Oct 2026	2	SAM	(yellow card) 63'	Professional foul	—			0	
Mitchell Prest	Fiji	25 Oct 2026	2	AUS	75'	High tackle - Careless	1	Guilty - Early Plea	2nd Offence	1	Lindsay Smith
Nixon Putt	Papua New Guinea	30 Oct 2026	3	ENG	37'	High tackle - Careless	1	Guilty - Early Plea	1st Offence	0	Ethan Havard
Jordan Miller	Fiji	31 Oct 2026	3	NZL	(yellow card) 77'					0	
Brandon Wakeham	Fiji	31 Oct 2026	3	NZL	(red card) 51'	Striking	2	Guilty - Early Plea	1st Offence	1	Ronaldo Mulitalo
Ronaldo Mulitalo	New Zealand	31 Oct 2026	3	FIJI	(red card) 51'	High tackle - Careless	2	Guilty - Early Plea	1st Offence	1	Ronald Philitoga
Alex Twal	Lebanon	1 Nov 2026	3	FRA	(yellow card) 76'						
Julian Bousquet	France	1 Nov 2026	3	LEB	(yellow card) 76'	Working on the ground					
Junior Paulo	Samoa	1 Nov 2026	3	TON	11'	Shoulder charge	1	Guilty - Early Plea	1st Offence	0	Dallin Watene-Zelezniak
Spencer Leniu	Samoa	8 Nov 2026	SF	AUS	(yellow card) 38'	Dissent					

Notes:

- Phoenix Crossland was ineligible for New Zealand until the semi-final due to his serving a four match ban incurred after being sent off in an NRL Preliminary Final for a hip drop tackle.

== Pool A squad statistics ==
In the initial three rounds, each team in Pool A plays matches against each of the other three teams in Pool A.

=== Australia ===
Head coach: (Australia) Kevin Walters

Australia announced their 23-man squad on 5 October 2026. Isaah Yeo was appointed captain.

Players are listed in positional order in line with team selection for the Final against New Zealand. Career statistics were drawn from the Rugby League Project website. Tournament statistics were drawn from the NRL website.

Player	Age	Position(s)	Tournament					Kangaroos Career						Club Competitions
Player	Age	Position(s)	Tournament					Kangaroos Career						2026 Club	Matches
Player	Age	Position(s)	M	T	G	F	P	Dbt	M	T	G	F	P	2026 Club	T1	T2
Reece Walsh	24	Fullback	4	5	5	0	30	2025	7	9	5	0	46	Brisbane Broncos	111	2
Jack Bostock	23	Wing, Centre	5	9	0	0	36	2026	5	9	0	0	36	Dolphins	55	16
Kotoni Staggs	25	Centre	5	2	0	0	8	2023	11	3	5	0	22	Brisbane Broncos	166	14
Bradman Best	25	Centre	4	2	0	0	8	2026	4	2	0	0	8	Newcastle Knights	122	3
Tom Trbojevic	30	Wing, Fullback	5	9	0	0	36	2017	12	15	0	0	60	Manly Sea Eagles	184	0
Cameron Munster	30	Five-eighth	4	0	15	0	30	2017	19	5	15	0	50	Melbourne Storm	255	7
Tom Dearden	25	Halfback, Five-eighth	5	1	0	0	4	2024	11	2	0	0	8	North Qld Cowboys	140	10
Patrick Carrigan	26	Prop, Lock	5	0	0	0	0	2022	19	0	0	0	0	Brisbane Broncos	148	25
Harry Grant	26	Hooker	4	1	0	0	4	2022	18	3	0	0	12	Melbourne Storm	141	40
Tino Fa'asuamaleaui	24	Prop	5	2	0	0	8	2022	15	3	0	0	12	Gold Coast Titans	132	28
Jacob Preston	25	Second-row	5	3	0	0	12	2026	5	3	0	0	12	Canterbury Bulldogs	80	12
Liam Martin	27	Second-row	4	2	0	0	8	2022	11	5	0	0	20	Penrith Panthers	164	36
Isaah Yeo	32	Lock	4	0	0	0	0	2022	17	2	0	0	8	Penrith Panthers	285	2
Ethan Strange	22	Five-eighth	2	0	1	0	2	2026	2	0	1	0	2	Canberra Raiders	67	16
Keaon Koloamatangi	28	Prop, Second-row	5	0	0	0	0	2025	8	0	0	0	0	South Sydney Rabbitohs	151	30
Cameron Murray	26	Lock, Second-row	4	0	0	0	0	2019	14	7	0	0	28	South Sydney Rabbitohs	182	19
Reuben Cotter	25	Second-row, Prop	5	0	0	0	0	2022	16	0	0	0	0	North Qld Cowboys	122	16
Latrell Mitchell	29	Centre, Fullback	1	0	0	0	0	2018	10	5	6	0	32	South Sydney Rabbitohs	194	2
Sam Walker	24	Halfback	1	1	6	0	16	2026	1	1	6	0	16	Sydney Roosters	108	8
Blayke Brailey	28	Hooker	1	0	0	0	0	2026	1	0	0	0	0	Cronulla Sharks	185	32
Lindsay Smith	26	Prop	1	0	0	0	0	2024	3	0	0	0	0	Penrith Panthers	105	39
James Tedesco	33	Fullback	2	0	0	0	0	2018	15	9	0	0	36	Sydney Roosters	296	0
David Fifita	26	Second-row	1	0	0	0	0	2026	1	0	0	0	0	South Sydney Rabbitohs	296	10
Mitchell Moses	32	Halfback	1	0	0	0	0	2024	4	1	0	0	4	Parramatta Eels	257	0

Notes:

- Lindsay Collins was originally named but ruled out due to a foot injury. He was replaced by Lindsay Smith.
- Other incumbent Australian players also unavailable for selection were Nathan Cleary (left leg fracture, right foot stress fracture) and Dylan Edwards (knee).
- Three shadow players were announced: Thomas Jenkins (Panthers), Hamish Stewart (Dragons), and Ethan Strange (Raiders).
- Five members of the squad have previously played for other nations:
  - Lebanon: Mitchell Moses (2017 and 2022).
  - Tonga: Keaon Koloamatangi (2022 to 2024); Kotoni Staggs (2019 and 2022) and Tonga Invitational (2019)
  - Samoa: Tino Fa'asuamaleaui (2019)
  - Italy: James Tedesco (2013, 2017)
- Nine members of the squad had played for Queensland
- Twelve members had played for New South Wales.
- Eleven members of the squad had previously played for the Australian Prime Minister's XIII team, including David Fifita who captained that team in the 2026 fixture on 3 October.
- Three members of the squad had played for Indigenous All Stars.

=== Cook Islands ===
Head coach: (Australia) Karmichael Hunt

Cook Islands announced their 23-man squad on 6 October 2026. KL Iro and Marata Niukore were named joint captains.

Players are listed in positional order in line with team selection for the Round 3 match against Australia. Career statistics were drawn from the Rugby League Project website. Tournament statistics were drawn from the NRL website.

Player	Age	Position(s)	Tournament					Cook Islands Career						Club Competitions
Player	Age	Position(s)	Tournament					Cook Islands Career						2026 Club	Matches
Player	Age	Position(s)	M	T	G	F	P	Dbt	M	T	G	F	P	2026 Club	T1	T2
Valentine Holmes	31	Fullback	2	0	3	0	6	2026	2	0	3	0	6	St George Illawarra	241	0
Paul Ulberg	30	Wing	1	0	0	0	0	2019	9	5	0	0	20	Toulouse Olympique	22	161
Kayal Iro	26	Centre	3	0	0	0	0	2019	14	3	1	0	14	Cronulla Sharks	61	0
Reubenn Rennie	31	Centre	3	0	0	0	0	2016	15	5	0	0	20	Toulouse Olympique	10	166
Cameron Brown	22	Wing	3	0	0	0	0	2026	3	0	0	0	0	Brisbane Tigers	0	14
Maui Winitana-Patelesio	—	Five-eighth	3	1	2	0	8	2026	3	1	2	0	8	New Zealand Warriors	0	6
Brad Takairangi	37	Halfback	3	0	0	0	0	2009	17	1	3	0	10	Glebe Dirty Reds	202	3
Davvy Moale	23	Prop	3	1	0	0	4	2022	12	5	0	0	20	Melbourne Storm	80	23
Rua Ngatikaura	26	Hooker	3	1	0	0	4	2022	12	4	0	0	16	Glebe Dirty Reds	0	48
Rhys Dakin	25	Prop	2	0	0	0	0	2023	8	0	0	0	0	Sydney Roosters	0	62
Amare Milford	20	Second-row	2	0	0	0	0	2026	2	0	0	0	0	Melbourne Storm	0	1
Delahia Wigmore	—	Second-row	3	0	0	0	0	2024	6	1	0	0	4	Penrith Panthers	0	14
Mason Teague	23	Lock, Hooker	3	0	0	0	0	2024	8	1	0	0	4	Burleigh Bears	8	75
K-Ci Newton-Whare	22	Prop	3	0	0	0	0	2026	3	0	0	0	0	Melbourne Storm	0	23
Makahesi Makatoa	33	Prop	3	0	0	0	0	2015	15	1	0	0	4	Sydney Roosters	61	168
David Tuariki	—	Second-row	2	0	0	0	0	2026	2	0	0	0	0	Melbourne Storm	0	0
Esan Marsters	30	Halfback, Wing	2	0	0	0	0	2015	15	3	3	0	18	Bradford Bulls	154	37
Chaev Kolone	19	Prop	2	0	0	0	0	2026	2	0	0	0	0	Canberra Raiders	0	10
Glassie Glassie	—	Centre	0	0	0	0	0	—	0	0	0	0	0	Wests Tigers	0	0
Brody Tamarua	27	Second-row	0	0	0	0	0	2019	3	0	0	0	0	Norths Devils	0	33
Pride Petterson-Robati	31	Lock, Prop	2	0	0	0	0	2019	12	1	0	0	4	Souths Logan Magpies	0	117
Esom Ioka	23	Fullback, Wing	2	3	0	0	12	2023	9	7	12	0	52	Brisbane Tigers	0	73
Reuben Porter	29	Second-row	1	0	0	0	0	2017	12	0	0	0	0	St George Illawarra	8	130
Marata Niukore	30	Second-row	0	0	0	0	0	2017	4	4	0	0	16	New Zealand Warriors	166	50

Notes:

- Brody Tamarua was initially omitted but was named in the squad to play in the Round 1 match against Fiji.
- Marata Niukore sustained a groin injury at Cook Islands training and was omitted from the Round 1 team.
- Valentine Holmes was recovering from a syndesmosis injury sustained in an NRL match on 6 September 2026, and was also not named.
- Four members of the squad have previously played for other international teams:
  - Australia (1): Valentine Holmes (2016–18 & 2022–23, 21 matches).
  - New Zealand (3): Esan Marsters (2018–19, 6), Marata Niukore (2022–24, 6), and Brad Takairangi (2017, 3)
- Three members of the squad played in the 2026 Super League season: Marsters (9), Rennie (10), and Ulberg (22).
- Four members of the squad played in the 2026 NRL season: Holmes (24 matches), Iro (23), Moale (10), and Niukore (9).
  - Two of the four also played in the second-tier NSW Cup: Moale (9) and Niukore (9).
- For twelve members of the squad, their highest level club football during 2026 was in the second-tier state competitions:
  - NSW (8): Dakin (1), Kolone (10), Makatoa (4), Milford (1), Newton-Whare (22), Porter (4), Wigmore (13), and Winitana-Patelesio (6).
  - QLD (5): Brown (5), Ioka (21), Petterson-Robati (20), Tamarua, and Teague (18).
- Two members of the squad played in the third-tier Ron Massey Cup: Ngatikaura and Takairangi:
- Two members of the squad played in the 2026 (Under 21) Jersey Flegg Cup: Glassie and Tuariki.

=== Fiji ===
Head coach: (Australia) Mick Potter

Fiji announced their 23-man squad on 5 October 2026. Apisai Koroisau was appointed captain.

Players are listed in positional order in line with team selection for the Round 3 match against New Zealand. Career statistics were drawn from the Rugby League Project website. Tournament statistics were drawn from the NRL website.

Player	Age	Position(s)	Tournament					Fiji Career						Club Competitions
Player	Age	Position(s)	Tournament					Fiji Career						2026 Club	Matches
Player	Age	Position(s)	M	T	G	F	P	Dbt	M	T	G	F	P	2026 Club	T1	T2
Sunia Turuva	24	Fullback, Wing	3	0	0	0	0	2022	13	5	0	0	20	Wests Tigers	97	33
Ronald Philitoga	25	Wing	2	0	0	0	0	2025	3	0	0	0	0	Northern Pride	0	46
Waqa Blake	32	Centre	3	1	0	0	4	2019	13	15	0	0	60	Bradford Bulls	207	41
Solomone Saukuru	21	Centre	3	2	0	0	8	2025	5	4	0	0	16	Wests Tigers	4	19
Semi Valemei	27	Wing	3	3	0	0	12	2022	13	8	0	0	32	Castleford Tigers	53	35
Kurt Donoghoe	24	Five-eighth	3	0	0	0	0	2024	6	0	0	0	0	Dolphins	56	24
Brandon Wakeham	27	Halfback	3	0	9	0	18	2019	16	1	59	1	123	Manly Sea Eagles	57	76
Jacob Saifiti	30	Prop	3	1	0	0	4	2015	10	1	0	0	4	Newcastle Knights	192	19
Apisai Koroisau	33	Hooker	3	0	0	0	0	2013	20	1	21	0	46	Wests Tigers	254	5
Emosi Ravosai	—	Prop	3	0	0	0	0	2026	3	0	0	0	0	New Zealand Warriors	0	3
Taane Milne	31	Second-row, Centre	3	2	0	0	8	2017	20	6	16	0	56	Huddersfield Giants	132	73
Kitione Kautoga	24	Second-row	3	1	0	0	4	2022	8	2	0	0	8	Parramatta Eels	37	41
Caleb Navale	23	Lock	3	1	0	0	4	2023	10	3	0	0	12	Manly Sea Eagles	12	30
Josese Lanyon	22	Hooker	3	0	0	0	0	2026	3	0	0	0	0	Wests Tigers	4	17
Elijah Keung	20	Prop	2	0	0	0	0	2026	2	0	0	0	0	South Sydney Rabbitohs	0	1
Jordan Miller	21	Prop	1	0	0	0	0	2024	3	0	0	0	0	Parramatta Eels	2	21
Joseph Litidamu	—	Centre, Wing	1	0	0	0	0	—	1	0	0	0	0	Melbourne Storm	0	24
Jordin Leiu	27	Second-row, Lock	2	0	0	0	0	2026	2	0	0	0	0	Norths Devils	0	103
Apenisa Driti	26	Prop	1	0	0	0	0	2026	1	0	0	0	0	Northern Pride	0	10
Zion Johnson	25	Wing	0	0	0	0	0	—	0	0	0	0	0	Sunshine Coast Falcons	0	42
Bayleigh Bentley-Hape	26	Fullback	2	0	0	0	0	2026	2	0	0	0	0	South Sydney Rabbitohs	10	42
Kylan Mafoa	—	Prop	0	0	0	0	0	2024	3	0	0	0	0	Manly Sea Eagles	0	14
Mitchell Prest	23	Prop	2	0	0	0	0	2026	2	0	0	0	0	Mackay Cutters	0	40

Notes:

- Zion Johnson was brought into the squad to replace initial selection, Jimmy Ngutlik, who had previously played (3 matches) for Papua New Guinea in the 2021 World Cup).
- Three members of the squad played in the 2026 Super League season: Blake (20 matches), Milne (23), and Valemei (7).
- Ten members of the squad played in the 2026 NRL season to varying extent: Bentley-Hape (1), Donoghoe (17), Kautoga (19), Koroisau (19), Lanyon (4), Navale (3), Saifiti (18), Saukuru (4), Turuva (21), and Wakeham (17).
  - Six of the ten also played in the second-tier NSW Cup: Bentley-Hape (17), Kautoga (1), Lanyon (16), Navale (1), Saukuru (19), and Wakeham (1).
- For ten members of the squad, their highest-level club football during 2026 was in the second-tier state competitions:
  - NSW (5): Keung (1), Litidamu (7), Mafoa (7), Miller (2), and Ravosai (3.
  - QLD (5): Driti (10), Johnson (22), Leiu (7), Philitoga (19), and Prest (20).

=== New Zealand ===
Head coach: (New Zealand) Stacey Jones

New Zealand announced their 23-man squad on 6 October 2026. James Fisher-Harris was appointed captain. Joseph Tapine was named as vice-captain.

Players are listed in positional order in line with team selection for the Final against Australia. Career statistics were drawn from the Rugby League Project website. Tournament statistics were drawn from the NRL website.

Player	Age	Position(s)	Tournament					Kiwis Career						Club Competitions
Player	Age	Position(s)	Tournament					Kiwis Career						2026 Club	Matches
Player	Age	Position(s)	M	T	G	F	P	Dbt	M	T	G	F	P	2026 Club	T1	T2
Kalyn Ponga	28	Fullback	3	2	0	0	8	2026	3	2	0	0	8	Newcastle Knights	164	0
Jamayne Isaako	30	Wing, Fullback	5	3	38	0	88	2018	19	12	90	1	229	Dolphins	185	44
Dane Gagai	35	Centre	4	2	0	0	8	2026	4	2	0	0	8	Newcastle Knights	339	0
Casey McLean	20	Centre, Wing	5	9	0	0	36	2024	9	17	0	0	68	Penrith Panthers	49	11
Ronaldo Mulitalo	27	Wing	4	3	0	0	12	2022	14	12	0	0	48	Cronulla Sharks	153	13
Kodi Nikorima	32	Five-eighth, Halfback	5	1	0	0	4	2015	24	4	0	0	16	Dolphins	243	9
Jahrome Hughes	32	Halfback	5	2	0	0	8	2019	16	9	0	0	36	Melbourne Storm	188	62
James Fisher-Harris	30	Prop	5	1	0	0	4	2016	26	3	0	0	12	New Zealand Warriors	245	9
Jeremy Marshall-King	30	Hooker	5	0	0	0	0	2022	9	3	0	0	12	Dolphins	168	40
Moses Leota	31	Prop	4	0	0	0	0	2022	13	0	0	0	0	Penrith Panthers	226	32
Isaiah Papali'i	28	Second-row	4	1	0	0	4	2018	20	6	1	0	26	Penrith Panthers	202	15
Briton Nikora	28	Second-row	4	2	0	0	8	2019	21	7	0	0	28	Cronulla Sharks	180	23
Joseph Tapine	32	Lock, Prop	5	0	0	0	0	2016	31	3	0	0	12	Canberra Raiders	260	16
Te Maire Martin	31	Hooker, Five-eighth	2	1	0	0	4	2016	8	4	0	0	16	New Zealand Warriors	123	31
Naufahu Whyte	24	Lock, Prop	4	0	0	0	0	2024	10	2	0	0	8	Sydney Roosters	82	38
Erin Clark	29	Hooker	5	1	0	0	4	2024	9	2	0	0	8	New Zealand Warriors	146	20
Xavier Willison	24	Prop, Second-row	4	2	0	0	8	2026	6	2	0	0	8	Brisbane Broncos	75	31
Keano Kini	22	Fullback	3	3	0	0	12	2024	8	5	0	0	20	Gold Coast Titans	52	17
Phoenix Crossland	26	Hooker, Halfback	4	1	0	0	4	2024	10	3	0	0	12	Newcastle Knights	131	20
Charnze Nicoll-Klokstad	31	Centre, Fullback	2	2	0	0	8	2019	19	9	0	0	36	New Zealand Warriors	152	65
Scott Sorensen	33	Second-row	1	1	0	0	4	2022	5	1	0	0	4	Penrith Panthers	163	85
Leo Thompson	26	Prop	1	0	0	0	0	2023	6	1	0	0	4	Canterbury Bulldogs	99	13
Tanner Stowers-Smith	22	Prop	1	2	0	0	8	2026	1	2	0	0	8	New Zealand Warriors	34	47
Jacob Laban	22	Second-row	1	0	0	0	0	2026	1	0	0	0	0	New Zealand Warriors	44	35

Notes:

- Six members of the squad had previously played for other nations:
  - Samoa (5): Clark, Isaako, Leota, Mulitalo and Papali'i.
  - Cook Islands (1): Nicoll-Klokstad.
  - Australia (1): Dane Gagai
- Sixteen squad members have played in All Stars matches.
  - Māori All Stars (16).
- Casey McLean played for New South Wales Under 19s in June 2024.

== Pool B squad statistics ==
In the initial three rounds, each team in Pool B plays matches against each of the three teams in Pool C.

=== England ===
Head coach: (England) Brian McDermott

England announced their 23-man squad on 5 October 2026. George Williams was appointed captain.

Players are listed in positional order in line with team selection for the Round 3 match against Papua New Guinea. Career statistics were drawn from the Rugby League Project website. Tournament statistics were drawn from the NRL website.

Player	Age	Position(s)	Tournament					England Career						Club Competitions
Player	Age	Position(s)	Tournament					England Career						2026 Club	Matches
Player	Age	Position(s)	M	T	G	F	P	Dbt	M	T	G	F	P	2026 Club	T1	T2
AJ Brimson	28	Fullback	3	3	0	0	12	2025	5	3	0	0	12	Gold Coast Titans	157	7
Dom Young	25	Wing	3	5	0	0	20	2022	12	15	0	0	60	Newcastle Knights	120	8
Hugo Savala	24	Centre	3	0	17	0	34	2026	3	0	17	0	34	Sydney Roosters	42	25
Herbie Farnworth	26	Centre	3	3	0	0	12	2022	13	9	0	0	36	Dolphins	142	25
Matty Ashton	28	Wing	2	2	0	0	8	2023	7	8	0	0	32	Warrington Wolves	124	24
George Williams	32	Stand-off	3	0	0	0	0	2015	28	13	1	0	54	Warrington Wolves	319	0
Harry Smith	26	Scrum-half	3	1	1	0	6	2022	13	2	39	0	86	Wigan Warriors	168	15
Max King	29	Prop	3	0	0	0	0	2026	3	0	0	0	0	Canterbury Bulldogs	159	9
Jez Litten	28	Hooker	3	1	0	0	4	2023	7	1	0	0	4	Hull Kingston Rovers	180	0
Luke Thompson	31	Prop	3	0	0	0	0	2026	3	0	0	0	0	Wigan Warriors	267	1
Junior Nsemba	22	Second-row	3	0	0	0	0	2024	4	0	0	0	0	Wigan Warriors	86	3
Kai Pearce-Paul	25	Second-row	3	0	0	0	0	2022	10	2	0	0	8	Wests Tigers	115	0
Morgan Knowles	29	Loose forward	1	1	0	0	4	2021	13	2	0	0	8	Dolphins	246	1
Mikey Lewis	25	Hooker	2	3	0	0	12	2023	10	5	1	0	22	Hull Kingston Rovers	137	4
Sam Walters	25	Second-row	3	0	0	0	0	2026	3	0	0	0	0	Wigan Warriors	90	4
Ethan Havard	26	Prop	2	0	0	0	0	2023	6	1	0	0	4	Wigan Warriors	129	0
Kallum Watkins	35	Second-row	1	0	0	0	0	2012	35	16	0	0	64	Leeds Rhinos	365	7
Brad O'Neill	24	Hooker	2	0	0	0	0	2024	3	0	0	0	0	Wigan Warriors	108	12
Zach Eckersley	22	Wing	1	1	0	0	4	2026	1	1	0	0	4	Wigan Warriors	65	15
Victor Radley	28	Loose forward	2	1	0	0	4	2022	12	3	0	0	12	Sydney Roosters	180	0
Ben Currie	32	Loose forward	1	0	0	0	0	2017	12	3	0	0	12	Warrington Wolves	306	2
Jack Welsby	25	Fullback	1	1	0	0	4	2022	16	5	0	0	20	St Helens	167	0
Ben Talty	27	Prop	0	0	0	0	0	—	0	0	0	0	0	Brisbane Broncos	30	94
Morgan Smithies	25	—	0	0	0	0	0	2023	3	0	0	0	0	Canberra Raiders	175	1

Notes:

- Morgan Smithies (Canberra Raiders) was selected in the initial squad but withdrew after incurring a hamstring injury at training. He was replaced by Kallum Watkins.
- Fourteen members of the squad played in the 2026 Super League season: Ashton, Currie, Eckersley, Havard, Lewis, Litten, Nsemba, O'Neill, Smith, Thompson, Walters, Watkins, Welsby, and Williams.
- Nine members of the squad played in the 2026 NRL season: Brimson, Farnworth, King, Knowles, Pearce-Paul, Radley, Savala, Talty, and Young. Injured player Smithies had also played in the 2026 NRL season.
- Two members of the squad previously played for other national teams:
  - Great Britain (1): Thompson (2019, 3 matches)
  - Ireland (1): Currie (2013, 3).

=== Lebanon ===
Head coach: (Australia) Michael Cheika

Lebanon announced their 23-man squad on 7 October 2026. Alex Twal was appointed captain.

Players are listed in positional order in line with team selection for the Round 3 match against France. Career statistics were drawn from the Rugby League Project website. Tournament statistics were drawn from the NRL website.

Player	Age	Position(s)	Tournament					Lebanon Career						Club Competitions
Player	Age	Position(s)	Tournament					Lebanon Career						2026 Club	Matches
Player	Age	Position(s)	M	T	G	F	P	Dbt	M	T	G	F	P	2026 Club	T1	T2
Jacob Kiraz	24	Fullback	3	0	0	0	0	2019	9	4	0	0	16	Canterbury Bulldogs	98	17
Tony Francis	23	Wing	3	1	0	0	4	2026	3	1	0	0	4	Ipswich Jets	10	75
Michael Gabrael	21	Centre	3	1	0	0	4	2026	3	1	0	0	4	Cronulla Sharks	1	33
Jordan Samrani	24	Centre	3	0	0	0	0	2026	3	0	0	0	0	Parramatta Eels	28	31
Jason Saab	26	Wing	3	0	0	0	0	2026	3	0	0	0	0	Manly Sea Eagles	129	11
Shadi Hammoud	—	Five-eighth	1	0	0	0	0	2026	1	0	0	0	0	St George Illawarra	0	2
Alex Conti	20	Halfback	3	1	7	0	18	2026	3	1	7	0	18	Canterbury Bulldogs	0	17
Jaxson Rahme	22	Prop	3	0	0	0	0	2022	7	0	0	0	0	Sydney Roosters	0	81
Tupou Francis	—	Hooker	3	0	0	0	0	2026	3	0	0	0	0	Burleigh Bears	0	11
James Roumanos	27	Prop	3	0	0	0	0	2019	9	0	0	0	0	Toulouse Olympique	24	117
Tony Sukkar	22	Second-row	3	1	0	0	4	2026	3	1	0	0	4	Wests Tigers	25	18
Abbas Miski	31	Second-row	3	1	0	0	4	2014	18	15	11	0	82	Wigan Warriors	76	75
Alex Twal	30	Lock	3	0	0	0	0	2017	7	0	0	0	0	Wests Tigers	181	27
Moustafa Dirani	—	Hooker	3	0	0	0	0	2025	4	0	0	0	0	St Marys Saints	0	0
Mikael Ibrahim	—	Second-row, Prop	3	0	0	0	0	2025	4	0	0	0	0	Gold Coast Titans	0	0
Jalal Bazzaz	26	Second-row	3	0	0	0	0	2019	10	0	0	0	0	Stingrays of Shellharbour	0	0
Khalil Rahme	26	Prop	1	0	0	0	0	2019	8	1	0	0	4		0	5
Ibrahim El Labban	—	—	0	0	0	0	0	2025	1	0	0	0	0	Wentworthville Magpies	0	0
Cameron Kanaan	21	Wing	0	0	0	0	0	—	0	0	0	0	0		0	1
Yehya Ayache	—	Hooker	1	0	0	0	0	2025	2	0	0	0	0	South Sydney Rabbitohs	0	15
Joseph Nohra	—	Halfback	1	0	0	0	0	—	1	0	0	0	0	Parramatta Eels	0	5
Mohamed Alameddine	—	Wing	0	0	0	0	0	2025	1	1	0	0	4	Parramatta Eels	0	12
Khaled Rajab	24	Five-eighth	2	0	0	0	0	2022	6	2	1	0	10	Newtown Jets	4	62
Charbel Tasipale	26	Second-row	0	0	0	0	0	2022	4	2	0	0	8		9	43
Brad Morkos	23	Centre	0	0	0	0	0	2022	5	1	0	0	4	St George Illawarra	0	44

Notes:

- Ibrahim El Labban was originally selected but replaced by Cameron Kanaan.
- Six members of the squad played in the 2026 NRL season: Gabrael (1 match), Kiraz (20), Saab (23), Samrani (15), Twal (16), and Tony Sukkar (9).
  - Three of the six also played in the second-tier NSW Cup: Gabrael (13), Samrani (2), and Sukkar (10).
  - Gabrael made his NRL debut in the 27th and final round of the regular season.
- For eleven members of the squad, their highest club football during 2026 was in the second-tier state competitions:
  - NSW (7): Alameddine (9), Ayache (11), Conti (17), Morkos (4), Nohra (5), Jaxson Rahme (20), and Rajab (8).
  - QLD (2): Tony Francis (21) and Tupou Francis (11).
- Brad Morkos played for Corrimal Cougars in that club’s first Grand Final appearance since 1989 in the Illawarra Rugby League.
- Jalal Bazzaz played for the Stingrays of Shellharbour in the 2026 South Coast Group 7 competition, including in a preliminary final loss.
- Moustafa Dirani played for St Marys Saints in the 2026 Ron Massey Cup competition, including in a grand final win.
- Mikael Ibrahim played for the Gold Coast Titans in the 2026 NRLQ series.

=== Samoa ===
Head coach: (Australia) Ben Gardiner

Samoa announced their 23-man squad on 6 October 2026. Jarome Luai and Junior Paulo were appointed joint captains.

Players are listed in positional order in line with team selection for the Semi-Final match against Australia. Career statistics were drawn from the Rugby League Project website. Tournament statistics were drawn from the NRL website.

Player	Age	Position(s)	Tournament					Toa Samoa Career						Club Competitions
Player	Age	Position(s)	Tournament					Toa Samoa Career						2026 Club	Matches
Player	Age	Position(s)	M	T	G	F	P	Dbt	M	T	G	F	P	2026 Club	T1	T2
Hamiso Tabuai-Fidow	25	Fullback	4	4	0	0	16	2022	5	4	0	0	16	Dolphins	127	0
Brian To'o	28	Wing	4	3	0	0	12	2019	16	10	0	0	40	Penrith Panthers	156	14
Izack Tago	24	Centre	4	3	0	0	12	2022	11	6	0	0	24	Penrith Panthers	114	15
Stephen Crichton	26	Centre	4	3	14	0	40	2022	12	7	44	1	117	Canterbury Bulldogs	162	7
Sualauvi Fa'alogo	23	Wing	4	6	0	0	24	2023	6	6	0	0	24	Melbourne Storm	46	39
Ronald Volkman	24	Five-eighth	3	2	4	0	16	2023	4	2	4	0	16	Parramatta Eels	26	58
Jarome Luai	29	Halfback	4	0	0	0	0	2017	21	3	0	0	12	Wests Tigers	172	39
Francis Molo	32	Prop	4	1	0	0	4	2022	10	1	0	0	4	Dolphins	175	64
Jazz Tevaga	31	Hooker, Lock	3	0	0	0	0	2017	13	1	0	0	4	Wakefield Trinity	186	36
Junior Paulo	32	Prop	4	0	0	0	0	2016	25	3	0	0	12	Parramatta Eels	280	0
Connelly Lemuelu	28	Second-row	4	0	0	0	0	2023	5	0	0	0	0	Dolphins	108	38
Jermaine McEwen	21	Second-row	4	1	0	0	4	2026	4	1	0	0	4	Newcastle Knights	39	13
Francis Manuleleua	22	Lock	4	1	0	0	4	2026	4	1	0	0	4	Newcastle Knights	14	28
Ben Ioelu	22	Hooker	4	2	0	0	8	2025	7	2	0	0	8	Sydney Roosters	17	33
Spencer Leniu	26	Prop	4	1	0	0	4	2022	11	1	0	0	4	Sydney Roosters	143	14
Clayton Faulalo	26	Wing, Centre	1	0	0	0	0	—	1	0	0	0	0	Manly Sea Eagles	25	60
Ata Mariota	24	Prop, Second-row	3	1	0	0	4	2025	4	1	0	0	4	Canberra Raiders	90	28
Shawn Blore	26	Second-row	2	3	0	0	12	2024	4	4	0	0	16	Melbourne Storm	94	21
Deine Mariner	23	Wing	1	1	0	0	4	2024	6	4	0	0	16	Brisbane Broncos	64	28
Pasami Saulo	28	Prop	0	0	0	0	0	—	0	0	0	0	0	Newcastle Knights	74	78
Enari Tuala	28	Centre, Wing	0	0	0	0	0	—	0	0	0	0	0	Canterbury Bulldogs	133	43
Eddie Ieremia-Toeava	21	Second-row	0	0	0	0	0	—	0	0	0	0	0	New Zealand Warriors	18	53
Chanel Harris-Tavita	27	Five-eighth	3	1	2	0	8	2019	13	6	2	0	28	New Zealand Warriors	117	31
Greg Marzhew	29	Wing	0	0	0	0	0	2023	1	0	0	0	0	Newcastle Knights	113	51

Notes:

- A bold number is the NRL Matches column indicates that the player has made all his NRL appearances for his current club.
- One player, Jazz Tevaga, was selected from a Super League club (Wakefield Trinity). All other players appeared in the 2026 NRL season.
- Five members of the squad have previously played for other international teams:
  - Cook Islands (1): Molo.
  - Australia (1): Tabuai-Fidow. Tabuai-Fidow and Tuala have played for the Prime Minister's XIII.
- Six members of the squad have played State of Origin.
  - NSW (4): Leniu , Luai, Paulo, and To'o.
  - Queensland (2): Molo and Tabuai-Fidow.
- Five squad members have played in All Stars matches.
  - Māori All Stars (4): Harris-Tavita, Luai, Saulo, and Tevaga.
  - Indigenous All Stars (1): Tabuai-Fidow.

== Pool C squad statistics ==
In the initial three rounds, each team in Pool C plays matches against each of the three teams in Pool B.

=== France ===
Head coach: (France) Laurent Frayssinous

France announced their 23-man squad on 1 October 2026. Benjamin Garcia was appointed captain.

Players are listed in positional order in line with team selection for the Round 3 match against Lebanon. Career statistics were drawn from the Rugby League Project website. Tournament statistics were drawn from the NRL website.

Player	Age	Position(s)	Tournament					France Career						Club Competitions
Player	Age	Position(s)	Tournament					France Career						2026 Club	Matches
Player	Age	Position(s)	M	T	G	F	P	Dbt	M	T	G	F	P	2026 Club	T1	T2
Arthur Mourgue	27	Fullback	3	0	3	1	8	2019	13	2	23	1	56	Hull Kingston Rovers	130	0
Leo Darrelatour	26	Wing	2	0	0	0	0	2025	3	1	0	0	4	Catalans Dragons	21	0
Guillermo Aispuro-Bichet	21	Centre	3	2	0	0	8	2023	7	5	3	0	26	Catalans Dragons	39	0
Roméo Tropis	21	Centre	2	0	0	0	0	2025	3	0	0	0	0	Toulouse Olympique	15	11
Benjamin Laguerre	25	Wing	3	0	0	0	0	2026	3	0	0	0	0	Toulouse Olympique	26	49
César Rougé	24	Stand-off	2	1	0	0	4	2022	10	5	6	0	32	Toulouse Olympique	65	2
Thomas Lacans	25	Scrum-half, Stand-off	2	0	0	0	0	2024	3	0	0	0	0	Toulouse Olympique	21	44
Romain Navarrete	32	Prop	3	0	0	0	0	2016	16	1	0	0	4	Catalans Dragons	195	15
Alrix Da Costa	29	Hooker	1	0	0	0	0	2016	14	2	0	0	8	Catalans Dragons	149	2
Julian Bousquet	35	Prop	2	0	0	0	0	2011	19	2	0	0	8	Catalans Dragons	293	8
Mathieu Cozza	26	Second-row, Loose forward	3	0	0	0	0	2023	5	0	0	0	0	Huddersfield Giants	48	35
Mathieu Jussaume	27	Second-row	3	0	0	0	0	2019	5	1	0	0	4	Toulouse Olympique	36	103
Benjamin Garcia	33	Hooker, Loose forward	3	0	0	0	0	2013	21	3	0	0	12	Catalans Dragons	258	17
Amir Bourouh	25	Hooker	3	1	0	0	4	2026	3	1	0	0	4	Hull F.C.	88	16
Lambert Belmas	29	Prop	3	0	0	0	0	2018	12	1	0	0	4	Toulouse Olympique	48	65
Jordan Dezaria	29	Prop	2	0	0	0	0	2019	11	1	0	0	4	Hull Kingston Rovers	99	13
Jowasa Drodrolagi	31	Second-row	1	0	0	0	0	2026	1	0	0	0	0	AS Carcassonne	0	0
Théo Fages	32	Scrum-half	2	0	0	0	0	2013	20	5	0	0	20	Baroudeurs de Pia	248	0
Fouad Yaha	30	Wing	1	0	0	0	0	2017	11	4	0	0	16	Racing Club Albi	155	5
Tiaki Chan	26	Prop	1	0	0	0	0	2023	5	1	0	0	4	Toulouse Olympique	70	4
Louis Grossemy	23	Second-row	2	0	0	0	0	2025	3	0	0	0	0	Toulouse Olympique	7	22
Arthur Romano	29	Second-row	2	0	0	0	0	2019	12	3	0	0	12	Hull F.C.	99	6
Latrell Siegwalt	25	Centre	2	0	0	0	0	2026	2	0	0	0	0	South Sydney Rabbitohs	8	50

Notes:

- Jowasa Drodrolagi represented Fiji at the 2021 World Cup, switching to France on residency grounds.
- Nineteen members of the squad played in the 2026 Super League season.
  - Two of the nineteen played for two Super League clubs in 2026.
    - Tiaki Chan played for Catalans in February and March, and Toulouse from April to mid-September.
    - Jordan Dezaria played one match for St Helens in early April and then ten matches for Hull KR between mid-April and the end of July.
  - Louis Grossemy played seven matches in the NSW Cup for Canterbury between March and late June 2026. Grossemy then transferred hemispheres and played seven matches for Toulouse between early July and mid-September 2026.
- Playing for South Sydney in 2026, Latrell Siegwalt appeared in 8 NRL and 11 NSW Cup matches.
- Three members of the squad played in the French domestic Super XIII 2025–2026 season: Drodrolagi, Fages, and Yaha.
  - In early June, Fages kicked a drop goal in golden point to win the Grand Final for his club, Pia, over Carcassonne.

=== Papua New Guinea ===
Head coach: (Australia) Jason Demetriou

Papua New Guinea announced their 23-man squad on 6 October 2026. Rhyse Martin was appointed captain.

Players are listed in positional order in line with team selection for the Round 3 match against England. Career statistics were drawn from the Rugby League Project website. Tournament statistics were drawn from the NRL website.

Player	Age	Position(s)	Tournament					PNG Kumuls Career						Club Competitions
Player	Age	Position(s)	Tournament					PNG Kumuls Career						2026 Club	Matches
Player	Age	Position(s)	M	T	G	F	P	Dbt	M	T	G	F	P	2026 Club	T1	T2
Zac Laybutt	24	Fullback, Centre	3	0	0	0	0	2023	8	3	6	0	24	North Qld Cowboys	42	31
Robert Derby	24	Wing	3	1	0	0	4	2022	11	9	0	0	36	North Qld Cowboys	20	55
Josh Feledy	22	Centre	1	0	0	0	0	2026	1	0	0	0	0	Manly Sea Eagles	15	0
Robert Mathias	25	Centre	1	0	0	0	0	2024	5	1	0	0	4	London Broncos	0	44
Dudley Dotoi	23	Wing	3	1	0	0	4	2025	4	2	0	0	8	Townsville Blackhawks	0	54
Gairo Voro	23	Five-eighth	3	2	0	0	8	2025	5	3	0	0	12	London Broncos	0	45
Bailey Biondi-Odo	24	Halfback	3	2	0	0	8	2026	3	2	0	0	8	Townsville Blackhawks	17	75
Epel Kapinias	28	Prop	3	1	0	0	4	2022	9	4	0	0	16	London Broncos	0	91
Liam Horne	28	Lock, Hooker	3	0	0	0	0	2022	10	0	0	0	0	Leigh Leopards	76	51
Valentine Richard	29	Prop	3	0	0	0	0	2023	10	1	0	0	4	Central Qld Capras	0	71
Rhyse Martin	33	Second-row	3	1	10	0	24	2014	24	8	82	0	196	Hull Kingston Rovers	186	83
Nixon Putt	31	Second-row	3	1	0	0	4	2017	18	6	0	0	24	Central Qld Capras	7	166
Luca Moretti	26	Lock, Prop	2	0	0	0	0	2026	2	0	0	0	0	Parramatta Eels	52	38
Finley Glare	23	Halfback	3	1	0	0	4	2025	5	1	0	0	4	London Broncos	0	55
Jacob Taulani	22	Second-row	1	0	0	0	0	2026	1	0	0	0	0	Newcastle Knights	0	23
Nene Macdonald	32	Centre	2	0	0	0	0	2013	24	15	0	0	60	St Helens	161	45
Sanny Wabo	27	Fullback	1	0	0	0	0	2026	1	0	0	0	0	PNG Hunters	0	64
Alex Max	—	Centre	0	0	0	0	0	—	0	0	0	0	0	London Broncos	0	47
Zev John	28	Second-row, Prop	0	0	0	0	0	2019	1	0	0	0	0	Central Qld Capras	0	88
Morea Morea	25	Fullback	2	0	0	0	0	2024	5	3	0	0	12	London Broncos	0	47
Rodrick Tai	27	Centre, Wing	1	0	0	0	0	2022	10	2	0	0	8	Central Qld Capras	33	56
Edwin Ipape	27	Hooker	2	0	0	0	0	2019	13	3	0	0	12	Leigh Leopards	92	33
Jack de Belin	35	Lock, Prop	2	0	0	0	0	2023	10	0	0	0	0	Parramatta Eels	270	6
Khaiya Waiembi	—	Prop	1	0	0	0	0	2026	1	0	0	0	0	Central Qld Capras	0	45
Sylvester Namo	26	Second-row	1	0	0	0	0	2022	10	3	0	0	12	PNG Hunters	20	56

Notes:

- Alex Max, Kyle Laybutt and Jacob Taulani were named as shadow players.
- Five members of the squad played in the second-tier 2026 RFL Championship: Glare (19 matches), Kapinias (17), Mathias (13), Morea (15), and Voro (25). All five played in the championship winning team, the London Broncos, which was also coached by Jason Demetriou.
- Four members of the squad played in the top-tier 2026 Super League season: Horne (28), Ipape (22), Macdonald (12), and Martin (22).
- Five members of the squad played in the 2026 NRL season: de Belin (18), Derby (2), Feledy (12), Laybutt (20), and Moretti (18).
  - Four of the five also played in the second-tier state competitions: Derby (13) in the Queensland Cup and de Belin (5), Feledy (7), and Moretti (2) in the NSW Cup.
- For nine members of the squad, their highest-level club football during 2026 was in the second-tier state competitions. All nine played in the Queensland Cup: Biondi-Odo (17), Dotoi (18), John (13), Namo (8), Putt (18), Richard (22), Tai (22), Wabo (16), and Waiembi (20).

=== Tonga ===
Head coach: (Australia) Kristian Woolf

Tonga announced their 24-man squad on 6 October 2026, with one player to be omitted. Addin Fonua-Blake and Jason Taumalolo were appointed joint captains.

Players are listed in positional order in line with team selection for the Semi-Final match against New Zealand. Career statistics were drawn from the Rugby League Project website. Tournament statistics were drawn from the NRL website.

Player	Age	Position(s)	Tournament					Tonga Career						Club Competitions
Player	Age	Position(s)	Tournament					Tonga Career						2026 Club	Matches
Player	Age	Position(s)	M	T	G	F	P	Dbt	M	T	G	F	P	2026 Club	T1	T2
Lehi Hopoate	21	Fullback	4	0	0	0	0	2024	9	0	0	0	0	Manly Sea Eagles	59	11
Dallin Watene-Zelezniak	31	Wing	3	0	0	0	0	2026	3	0	0	0	0	New Zealand Warriors	250	1
Toluta'u Koula	24	Centre	4	2	0	0	8	2022	13	6	0	0	24	Manly Sea Eagles	101	6
Paul Alamoti	22	Centre	2	1	1	0	6	2024	6	1	1	0	6	Penrith Panthers	75	33
Sosefo Fifita	23	Wing	4	5	0	0	20	2026	4	5	0	0	20	Gold Coast Titans	78	12
Tui Lolohea	31	Five-eighth, Halfback	4	0	3	0	6	2015	25	5	9	0	38	Huddersfield Giants	252	18
Isaiya Katoa	22	Halfback	3	0	12	0	24	2022	15	2	49	1	107	Dolphins	89	2
Addin Fonua-Blake	31	Prop	4	1	0	0	4	2017	21	2	0	0	8	Cronulla Sharks	232	9
Salesi Foketi	21	Hooker	4	0	0	0	0	2026	4	0	0	0	0	Sydney Roosters	44	18
Jason Taumalolo	33	Prop, Lock	4	0	0	0	0	2013	22	4	0	0	16	North Qld Cowboys	309	1
Haumole Olakau'atu	28	Second-row	4	2	0	0	8	2022	13	4	0	0	16	Manly Sea Eagles	130	17
Siua Wong	23	Second-row	4	0	0	0	0	2023	9	0	0	0	0	Sydney Roosters	66	40
Tyson Frizell	35	Lock	3	0	0	0	0	2023	6	1	0	0	4	Newcastle Knights	305	0
Soni Luke	30	Hooker	1	0	0	0	0	2022	11	1	0	0	4	North Qld Cowboys	45	75
Stefano Utoikamanu	26	Prop	4	1	0	0	4	2025	5	1	0	0	4	Melbourne Storm	127	23
Demitric Vaimauga	22	Second-row	3	0	0	0	0	2025	5	1	0	0	4	New Zealand Warriors	53	0
Taniela Paseka	29	Prop	3	0	0	0	0	2024	6	0	0	0	0	Manly Sea Eagles	143	18
Leka Halasima	21	Second-row	4	1	0	0	4	2025	5	1	0	0	4	New Zealand Warriors	50	0
Latu Fainu	21	Five-eighth	2	0	0	0	0	2023	3	0	0	0	0	Wests Tigers	36	19
Kulikefu Finefeuiaki	22	Second-row	1	0	0	0	0	2025	2	0	0	0	0	Dolphins	80	15
Sione Katoa	29	Wing	1	2	0	0	8	2022	11	6	0	0	24	Cronulla Sharks	148	84
Talatau Amone	24	Five-eighth	0	0	0	0	0	2022	4	2	0	0	8	Wynnum Manly Seagulls	54	13
Robert Toia	22	Centre	2	1	0	0	4	2025	3	1	0	0	4	Sydney Roosters	45	12
Moeaki Fotuaika	26	Prop	0	0	0	0	0	2022	11	1	0	0	4	Gold Coast Titans	187	7

Notes

- Five members of the squad have previously played for other international teams:
  - Fiji (1): Wong.
  - New Zealand (3): Fonua-Blake, Taumalolo, and Watene-Zelezniak. Taumalolo also played one match for the NRL All Stars
  - Australia (1): Frizell. Frizell and Fifita have played for the Prime Minister's XIII.
  - Wales (1): Frizell.
- Two members of the squad played in other representative matches:
  - The Tonga Invitational team in 2019 (2): Lolohea and Taumalolo.
- Nine members of the squad have played State of Origin.
  - NSW (5): Fonua-Blake, Frizell, Koula, Olakau'atu, and Utoikamanu. Frizell also played for NSW Country.
  - Queensland (4): Fifita, Finefeuiaki, Fotuaika, and Toia.

== Key to acronyms ==
The following acronyms and abbreviations are used in the above tables:

- Tournament – Appearance and scoring tallies within the 2026 World Cup. Will be blank until matches are played.
  - M — Matches
  - T — Tries
  - G — Goals
  - F — Field Goals (also known as Drop goals)
  - P — Points
- International Career basic statistics appear under the team moniker – e.g. **Kiwis Career** for the New Zealand men's team.
  - Dbt — Debut Year. Where a player has played for two or more nations. the year displayed reflects the first appearance foe their current team.
- Club Competitions
  - 2026 Club
  - Where a player's 2026 club is outside the Super League or NRL it is shaded in the table.
  - Matches – Tally of games played in club competitions
    - T1 — Tier 1 club competitions. The National Rugby League in Australia / New Zealand and the Super League in England.
    - T2 — Tier 2 club competitions. Matches played between in the NSW Cup, Queensland Cup, and or RFL Championship.
    - Numbers in **bold** indicate that the player has played all his matches at that tier for his current club.
- Other Representative Matches — An icon and number of matches is used.

== See also ==
- 2026 Men's Rugby League World Cup
- 2026 Men's Rugby League World Cup squads
- 2026 Women's Rugby League World Cup statistics
