= International rugby league in 2015 =

This is a list of international rugby league matches played throughout 2015. A † denotes a recognised, but unofficial match that did not contribute to the IRL World Rankings.

== May ==
=== Melanesian Cup ===
2 May 2015

Papua New Guinea	10 – 22	Fiji
Try: Trnka 52'; S Albert 68' c Goal: Damen (0/1); Zeming (1/1) 69'	Video	Try: Bukuya 20' c Koroibete (2) 28' c, 34' c Goodall 76'; Goal: Koroisau (3/3) 22', 29', 35'; Wiliame (0/1)

Cbus Super Stadium, Gold Coast
Referee: (Australia) Matt Cecchin
Player of the Match: Marika Koroibete (Fiji)

FB	1	Josh Damen
WG	2	Nene MacDonald
CE	3	Thompson Teteh
CE	4	Kato Ottio
WG	5	Matt Trnka
FE	6	Israel Eliab (c)
HB	7	Noel Zeming
PR	8	Stanton Albert
HK	9	Ray Thompson
PR	10	Wellington Albert
SR	11	Rhyse Martin
SR	12	Tyson Martin
LL	13	Luke Page
Substitutions:
BE	14	Wartovo Puara
BE	15	Willie Minoga
BE	16	Brandy Peter
BE	17	Adam Korave
Coach:
(Australia) Mal Meninga

FB	1	Kevin Naiqama
WG	2	Marika Koroibete
CE	3	Fabian Goodall
CE	4	Brayden Wiliame
WG	5	Eto Nabuli
FE	6	Daryl Millard
HB	7	Ryan Millard
PR	8	Eloni Vunakece
HK	9	Apisai Koroisau
PR	16	Tikiko Noke
SR	11	Jayson Bukuya (c)
SR	12	Jacob Saifiti
LK	13	Korbin Sims
Substitutions:
BE	10	Daniel Saifiti
BE	14	Tyrone Phillips
BE	15	Viliame Kikau
BE	17	Osea Sadrau
Coach:
(Australia) Rick Stone

=== Polynesian Cup ===
2 May 2015

Samoa	18 – 16	Tonga
Try: McGuire 24' c Vidot 37'; Pritchard 56'; Peyroux 70'; Goal: Simona (1/4) 26'	Video	Try: Tafua (2) 28', 48'; S Manu 52' c Goal: Langi (0/2); Kata (2/2) 53', 65'

Cbus Super Stadium, Gold Coast
Attendance: 12,336
Referee: (Australia) Ben Cummins
Player of the Match: Sam Kasiano (Samoa)

FB	1	Tautau Moga
WG	2	Pat Mata'utia
CE	3	Joseph Leilua
CE	4	Ricky Leutele
WG	5	Daniel Vidot
FE	6	Carlos Tuimavave
HB	7	Tim Simona
PR	8	Sam Kasiano
HK	9	Josh McGuire
PR	10	Sauaso Sue
SR	11	Leeson Ah Mau
SR	12	Frank Pritchard (c)
LK	13	Isaac Liu
Substitutions:
BE	15	Dunamis Lui
BE	16	Sam Lisone
BE	17	Dominique Peyroux
BE	18	Michael Sio
Coach:
(Australia) Matt Parish

FB	1	Tuimoala Lolohea
WG	2	Jorge Taufua
CE	3	Konrad Hurrell
CE	5	Mahe Fonua
WG	14	Sosaia Feki
FE	6	Samisoni Langi
HB	4	Solomone Kata
PR	8	Richard Fa'aoso
HK	9	Pat Politoni
PR	10	Peni Terepo
SR	11	Sika Manu (c)
SR	12	Manu Ma'u
LK	13	Sio Siua Taukeiaho
Substitutions:
BE	7	Joel Luani
BE	15	Ben Murdoch-Masila
BE	16	Felise Kaufusi
BE	17	Albert Vete
Coach:
(Australia) Kristian Woolf

=== ANZAC Test ===
The 2015 Anzac Test was a rugby league test match played between Australia and New Zealand at Suncorp Stadium in Brisbane. It was the 16th Anzac Test played between the two nations under the Super League banner since 1997. Both sides were announced on 26 April. The game was originally scheduled to take place on 1 May, but it was postponed due to weather until May 3.

3 May 2015
4:15pm (AEST)

Australia	12 – 26	New Zealand
Tries: Sam Thaiday (13') 1 Will Chambers (59') 1 Goals: Johnathan Thurston 2/2 (14', 59')		Tries: Manu Vatuvei (20', 28') 2 Shaun Johnson (31') 1 Shaun Kenny-Dowall (40') 1 Goals: Shaun Johnson 5/6 (8' pen, 29', 33', 39' pen, 40')

Suncorp Stadium, Brisbane
Attendance: 32,681
Referee: Gerard Sutton (Australia)
Player of the Match: Manu Vatuvei

== October ==
=== Friendly ===
3 October 2015

Niue	44 – 22	Cook Islands
	Report

Sydney

=== European Championships ===
==== Round 1 ====
16 October 2015

Wales	18–12	Scotland
Tries: Parry, Grant, Walker; Goals: Davies (3/5)	Report	Tries: Ferguson, Thomas; Goals: Brough 2/2

Racecourse Ground, Wrexham

17 October 2015

France	31–14	Ireland
Tries: Robin, Sigismeau, Gigot (2), Fages, Larroyer; Goals: Marginet 3/4; Drop goals: Boudebza	Report	Tries: Dunne, Hargreaves; Goals: Finn 3/3

Stadium Municipal d'Albi, Albi

==== Round 2 ====
23 October 2015

Scotland	22–24	Ireland
Tries: Addy (2), Toal, Ferguson; Goals: Brough 3/4	Report	Tries: Ambler (2), Hargreaves, Grix; Goals: Finn 4/5

Netherdale, Galashiels

*30 October 2015

Wales	14–6	France
Tries: Grant, Burke, Davies; Goals: Davies (1/3)	Report	Tries: Simon; Goals: Barthau 1/1

Cardiff Arms Park, Cardiff

==== Round 3 ====
7 November 2015

France	32–18	Scotland
Tries: Arnaud, Gigot (2), Larroyer, Escare, Robin, Perez; Goals: Marginet 2/7	Report	Tries: Toal, Scott, Hood; Goals: Thomas 3/3

Parc des Sports, Avignon

7 November 2015

Ireland	4–30	Wales
Tries: Mulkeen	Report	Tries: Grant, Reece, Parry, Lloyd, Kear; Goals: Davies 5/6

Carlisle Grounds, Bray

=== 2017 Rugby League World Cup qualification – Asia-Pacific play-off ===
Before the game Tongan coach, Kristian Woolf, noted how players eligible for second-tier nations such as Tonga and Samoa were punished if they pursued an opportunity with an Australian or New Zealand Test or Origin squad. He made the complaint after Tongan internationals Sio Siua Taukeiaho and Tuimoala Lolohea played for the Kiwis in their 2015 New Zealand rugby league tour of England against England. Now, Tonga can't pick these two players until a 2-year period has passed. Woolf said "Some flexibility in those rules would certainly help in terms of helping your tier two nations becoming more competitive with your first-tier nations."

17 October 2015

Tonga	28 – 8	Cook Islands
Try: Tafua 13' c Fonua 34' c Kata (2) 63', 68' c Terepo 74' c Goal: Kata (4/5) 14', 35', 69', 75'	Report	Try: Nicoll-Klokstad 4'; Gelling 23' Goal: Rapana (0/2)

Campbelltown Stadium, Campbelltown
Attendance: 4,813
Referee: (Australia) Gerard Sutton
Player of the Match: Solomone Kata (Tonga)

=== Friendly ===
24 October 2015

England	84 – 4	France
	Report

Leigh Sports Village
Attendance: 8,380

== November ==
=== Test 1 ===
1 November 2015

England	26–12	New Zealand
Try: Hodgson 21' c Ferres (2) 36' c, 59' c O'Loughlin 77' c Goal: Widdop (5/5) 21', 36', 46', 59', 77'		Try: Harris 7'; Moa 17' c Goal: Luke (2/3) 17', 27'

KC Stadium, Kingston-upon-Hull
Attendance: 23,526
Referee: (England) Ben Thaler

FB	1	Zak Hardaker
RW	2	Joe Burgess
RC	3	Kallum Watkins
LC	4	John Bateman
LW	5	Ryan Hall
SO	6	Gareth Widdop
SH	7	George Williams
PR	8	James Graham
HK	9	Josh Hodgson
PR	10	Chris Hill
SR	11	Elliott Whitehead
SR	12	Liam Farrell
LF	13	Sean O'Loughlin (Captain)
Substitutions:
BE	14	James Roby
BE	15	Tom Burgess
BE	16	Michael Cooper
BE	17	Brett Ferres
Coach:
Steve McNamara

FB	1	Roger Tuivasa-Sheck
RW	2	Jason Nightingale
RC	3	Jordan Kahu
LC	4	Dean Whare
LW	5	Shaun Kenny-Dowall
FE	6	Peta Hiku
HB	7	Tuimoala Lolohea
PR	8	Jesse Bromwich
HK	9	Issac Luke (Captain)
PR	10	Sam Moa
SR	11	Kevin Proctor
SR	12	Tohu Harris
LK	13	Adam Blair (Captain)
Substitutions:
BE	14	Kodi Nikorima
BE	15	Martin Taupau
BE	16	Ben Matulino
BE	17	Sio Siua Taukeiaho
Coach:
Stephen Kearney

Alex Glenn and Lewis Brown were named as 18th and 19th man respectively for the Kiwis.

=== Test 2 ===
7 November 2015

England	2–9	New Zealand
Goal: Widdop (1/1) 8'		Try: Kenny-Dowall 43' c Goal: Luke (1/2) 14'; Kahu (1/1) 43'; Drop Goal: Kahu (1/1) 77'

Olympic Park, London
Attendance: 44,393
Referee: (Australia) Gerard Sutton

FB	1	Zak Hardaker
RW	2	Joe Burgess
RC	3	Kallum Watkins
LC	4	John Bateman
LW	5	Ryan Hall
SO	6	Gareth Widdop
SH	7	George Williams
PR	8	James Graham
HK	9	Josh Hodgson
PR	10	Chris Hill
SR	11	Elliott Whitehead
SR	12	Liam Farrell
LF	13	Sean O'Loughlin (Captain)
Substitutions:
BE	14	James Roby
BE	15	Tom Burgess
BE	16	Michael Cooper
BE	17	Brett Ferres
Coach:
Steve McNamara

FB	1	Roger Tuivasa-Sheck
RW	2	Jason Nightingale
RC	3	Jordan Kahu
LC	4	Dean Whare
LW	5	Shaun Kenny-Dowall
FE	6	Peta Hiku
HB	19	Kodi Nikorima
PR	8	Jesse Bromwich
HK	9	Issac Luke (Captain)
PR	10	Sam Moa
SR	11	Kevin Proctor
SR	12	Tohu Harris
LK	13	Adam Blair (Captain)
Substitutions:
BE	14	Lewis Brown
BE	15	Martin Taupau
BE	16	Ben Matulino
BE	17	Alex Glenn
Coach:
Stephen Kearney

Stephen Kearney originally named Tuimoala Lolohea at halfback before selecting Kodi Nikorima to start the match.

=== Test 3 ===
14 November 2015

England	20–14	New Zealand
Try: Whitehead (2) 27' c, 63' c O'Loughlin 72' c Goal: Widdop (4/4) 5', 27', 63', 72'		Try: Nightingale 36' c Tuivasa-Sheck 75'; Kahu 79'; Goal: Luke (1/3) 36'

DW Stadium, Wigan
Attendance: 24,741
Referee: (England) Ben Thaler

FB	1	Zak Hardaker
RW	2	Jermaine McGillvary
RC	3	Kallum Watkins
LC	4	John Bateman
LW	5	Ryan Hall
SO	6	Gareth Widdop
SH	7	Matty Smith
PR	8	James Graham
HK	9	Josh Hodgson
PR	10	Chris Hill
SR	11	Elliott Whitehead
SR	12	Liam Farrell
LF	13	Sean O'Loughlin (Captain)
Substitutions:
BE	14	James Roby
BE	15	Tom Burgess
BE	16	Michael Cooper
BE	17	Brett Ferres
Coach:
Steve McNamara

FB	1	Roger Tuivasa-Sheck
RW	2	Jason Nightingale
RC	3	Jordan Kahu
LC	4	Dean Whare
LW	5	Shaun Kenny-Dowall
FE	6	Peta Hiku
HB	7	Kodi Nikorima
PR	8	Jesse Bromwich
HK	9	Issac Luke (Captain)
PR	10	Sam Moa
SR	11	Kevin Proctor
SR	12	Tohu Harris
LK	13	Adam Blair (Captain)
Substitutions:
BE	14	Lewis Brown
BE	15	Martin Taupau
BE	16	Ben Matulino
BE	17	Alex Glenn
Coach:
Stephen Kearney

With the win, England retained the Baskerville Shield. Isaac Liu and Gerard Beale were 18th and 19th man respectively for New Zealand.
