= Vatubua =

Vatubua is a surname. Notable people with the surname include:

- Jale Vatubua (born 1991), Fijian rugby union player
- Jioji Vatubua, Fijian rugby league and union player
- Waisale Vatubua, Fijian rugby league and union player
