= Rugby in Fiji =

Rugby in Fiji may refer to:

- Rugby league in Fiji
- Rugby union in Fiji
