= Junior Roqica =

Fiji international rugby league footballer

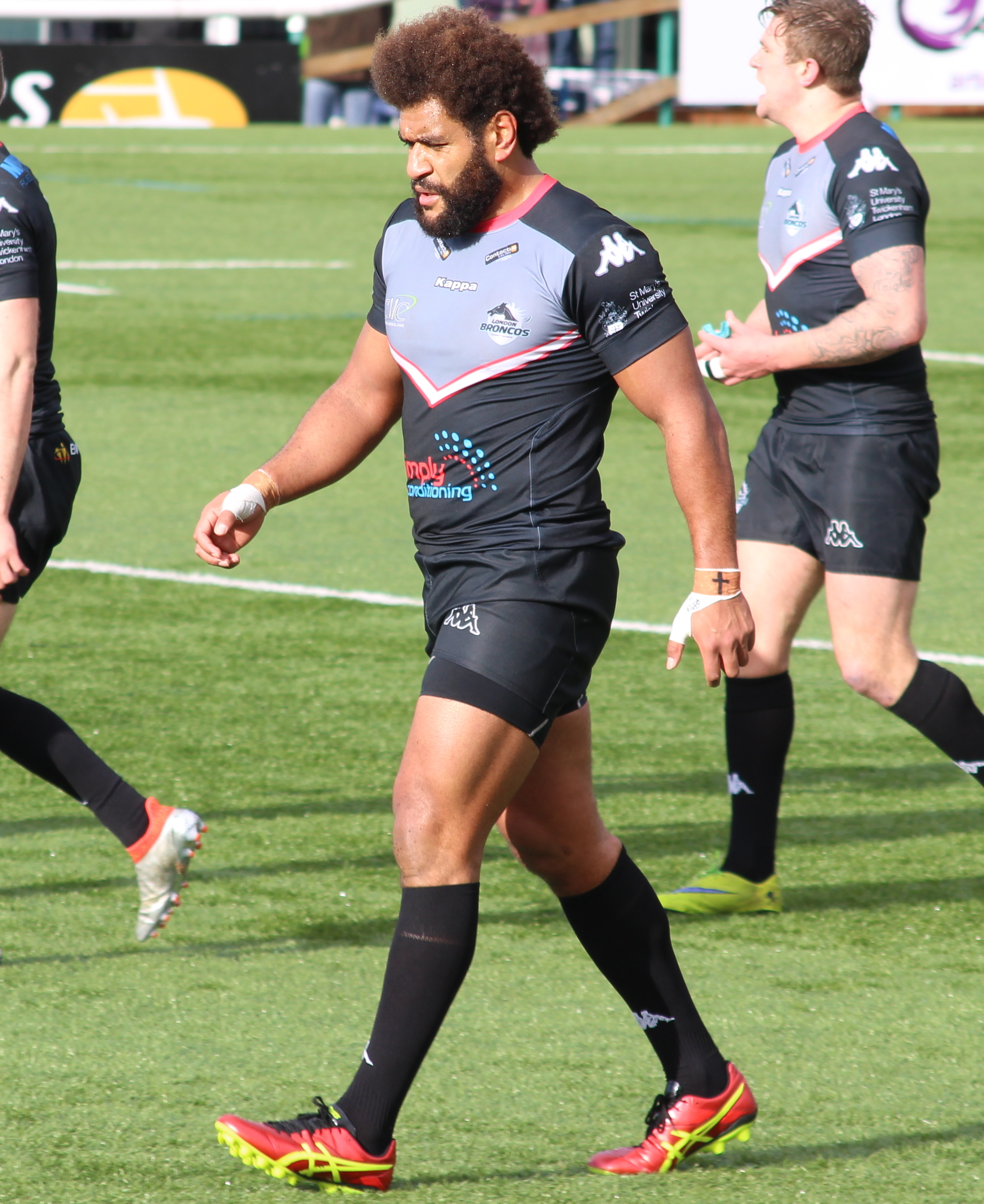

Personal information
- Full name: Vitale Junior Roqica
- Born: 13 February 1991 (age 34); Camperdown, New South Wales, Australia
- Height: 6 ft 3 in (1.91 m)
- Weight: 17 st 5 lb (110 kg)

Playing information
- Position: Prop, Second-row
Club
Years	Team	Pld	T	G	FG	P
2014	Cronulla Sharks	6	0	0	0	0
2017	London Broncos	20	5	0	0	20
	Total	26	5	0	0	20
Representative
Years	Team	Pld	T	G	FG	P
2013–19	Fiji	15	1	1	0	6
2019	Fiji Prime Minister's XIII	1	0	0	0	0
- Source: As of 10 November 2023

Vitale Junior Roqica (born 13 February 1991) is a Fiji international rugby league footballer who plays as a prop or second-row forward.

He played for the Cronulla-Sutherland Sharks in the NRL and the London Broncos in the Championship, and was contracted to the Newcastle Knights in the National Rugby League.

== Early life ==
Roqica was born in Camperdown, New South Wales, Australia and is of Fijian descent. He played his junior football for the Concord Burwood Wolves and Holy Cross Rhinos, while participating in the Balmain Tigers development program before being signed by the Wests Tigers.

== Playing career ==
=== Wests Tigers ===
Roqica played for the Wests Tigers' NYC team from 2008 to 2011.

=== Canterbury-Bankstown Bulldogs ===
In 2012, Roqica joined the Canterbury-Bankstown Bulldogs.

He failed to play a game in the NRL for Canterbury-Bankstown, but featured in their NSW Cup side.

=== Cronulla-Sutherland Sharks ===
In 2013, Roqica joined the Cronulla-Sutherland Sharks.

In Round 11 of the 2014 NRL season, Roqica made his NRL début for Cronulla-Sutherland against the South Sydney Rabbitohs.

Whilst contracted to Cronulla-Sutherland, Roqica spent most of playing time on the field for the Newtown club, playing in the NSW Cup and the rebranded Intrust Super Premiership NSW.

=== London Broncos ===
Roqica joined London ahead of the 2017 Super League season.

== Representative career ==
Roqica played for the New South Wales Catholic Colleges team when he was 17.

In 2009, Roqica played for the Australian schoolboys.

In 2013, Roqica was named in the Fiji squad for the 2013 Rugby League World Cup. He made his international début against Ireland. He scored the decisive try in Fiji's quarter-final victory over Samoa.

In May 2014, Roqica played for Fiji in the 2014 Pacific Test.

On 7 May 2016, Roqica played for Fiji against Papua New Guinea in the 2016 Melanesian Cup.
