= Sabeto Roosters =

The Sabeto Roosters Rugby League Club (SRRLC) is rugby league franchise based in Koroyaca Village, Sabeto in Nadi. The SRRLC has teams competing in all grades of the Fiji National Rugby League Competition annually.

The club has so far won 3 Super Eight Championship titles, 2 Reserve Grade Titles, 1 Under Eighteen Title and 1 U16 Title.

== Founding ==
SRRLC was founded in 1992 at Erenavula House in Sabeto by a group of rugby league players who represented Fiji on the Fiji Bati Australia Tour.

== Establishment ==
SRRLC was later established and became fully a recognised rugby league club in 2008 after successfully registering the club to the Fiji National Rugby League office in Suva. The club is yet to register as a company to pursue is business development goals projected in the Club charter.

== Organisation structure ==
Sabeto Rugby League Club is owned by the Patron (who is the Paramount King of Sabeto District, Fiji) and Managed by the Management Board consisting the Club President, Club Manager & his assistant, Treasurer, Secretary & Administrator. Below the Patron, the President of the Club Chairs the General Meetings on His behalf and presides in those meeting. Each team under the club banner has its own respective Team Managers that manage individual teams during the annual championships.

== Fiji National Rugby League Championship Achievements ==
- 2015 - Top 8 Premier Champion
- 2015 - Premier Nines Champion
- 2015 - Under 16 Champion
- 2014 - Reserved Grade Champion
- 2014 - Under 18 Champion
- 2013 - Top 8 Premier Champion
- 2011 - Under 18 Champion
- 2010 - Top 8 Premier Champion

== Current Management Board ==
- Patron: RATU Tevita Susu Mataitoga
- President: Taniela Naika
- Secretary & Sponsorships: Don Natabe
- Treasurer: Josaia Qoro
- General manager: RATU Viliame Mataitoga
- Board Members:
- Poate Naravu
- Setareki Rika
- RATU Josaia Nabukatavatava
- Emitai Malomalo
- Saimoni Bok
- Apete Bogitini
- Sakiusa Naravu
- Marika Lewaqai
- RATU Kaliova Lumuni

== See also ==
- Fiji National Rugby League Competition
- Fiji women's national rugby league team
- Rugby league in Fiji
- Fiji national rugby league team
