= Tikiko Noke =

Fiji international rugby league footballer

Personal information
- Born: 15 September 1994 (age 32) Fiji
- Height: 168 cm (5 ft 6 in)
- Weight: 101 kg (15 st 13 lb)

Playing information
- Position: Second-row, Prop
Representative
Years	Team	Pld	T	G	FG	P
2013–15	Fiji	1	0	0	0	0
2019	Fiji Prime Minister's XIII	1	0	0	0	0
- Source: As of 16 November 2026

Tikiko Noke is a Fijian rugby league footballer for the Ravoravo Rabbitohs and the Kaiviti Silktails. who represented Fiji at the 2013 World Cup.

== Early years ==
Noke attended Lautoka Central College.

== Playing career ==
From the Lautoka Crushers in the Fiji National Rugby League Competition, Noke was selected as part of the Fijian squad for the 2013 World Cup in Great Britain. He did not play in any matches for Fiji at the tournament but, following the tournament, turned down an offer to join the Rochdale Hornets, instead opting to train with the Newcastle Knights under-20s squad.

Noke was selected for Fiji for the 2015 Melanesian Cup and started at prop in the 22–10 victory over Papua New Guinea. He was one of only three domestic based players in the Fijian team.

In 2016 he played in the Queensland Cup for the Souths Logan Magpies and their feeder club in the Brisbane Rugby League, the Normanby Hounds.
