= Fiji Prime Minister's XIII =

Fijian representative rugby league team

Team information
- Governing body: FNRL
- Head coach: Brandon Costin
- Captain: Ratu Luke Nadurutalo

Uniforms
First colours

Team results
- First international
- Fiji PM's XIII vs (Australia) Australian PM's XIII (ANZ National Stadium, Suva, Fiji; 11 October 2019)

Fiji Prime Minister's XIII, or sometimes informally referred to as the Fiji PM's XIII, is the name of a representative rugby league team, comprising Fijian players from the Fiji National Rugby League. Established in 2019, the team is selected to play an annual fixture against Australian Prime Minister's XIII in Fiji at the end of the rugby league season.

== History ==
From 2005 to the 2018, the Australian Prime Minister's XIII side played an annual fixture against the PNG Prime Minister's XIII in Papua New Guinea. On 12 March 2019, the NRL announced that the Australian PM's XIII side would play the Fiji Prime Minister's XIII for the first time.

The first game between the two will be played at Suva's ANZ National Stadium, with the Fijian side comprising players from the Fiji National Rugby League competition.

== Results ==
=== 2019 ===
11 October 2019
6:30pm

Fiji PM's XIII	10 – 52	(Australia) Australian PM's XIII
Tries: Ropate Tobe (19') 1 Apimeleki Lutu (53') 1 Goals: Timoci Namotokula 1/1 (54'); Maika Tudravu 0/1	1st: 4 – 26; 2nd: 6 – 26	Tries: 3 (22', 29', 50') Clint Gutherson; 2 (2', 43') Kyle Feldt; 1 (6') Payne Haas; 1 (10') Campbell Graham; 1 (65') Paul Momirovski; 1 (69') Reuben Garrick; 1 (74') David Fifita; 1 (80') Cody Walker; Goals: 2/4 Mitchell Moses (7', 23'); 2/3 Paul Momirovski (30', 45'); 0/1 Reuben Garrick; 0/1 Ben Hunt; 0/1 Clint Gutherson; 0/1 Kyle Feldt

ANZ National Stadium, Suva
Referee: Chris Butler (Australia)

Fiji Prime Minister's XIII
2019 squad		Coaching staff
1 Josua Waqavere – FB; 5 Maika Tudravu – WG; 3 Pio Seci – CE; 4 Ratu Luke Nadurutalo (c) – CE; 2 Ropate Tobe – WG; 6 Mosese Qionomacawa – FE; 7 Penioni Tagituimua – HB; 8 Tikiko Noke – PR; 9 Apimeleki Lutu – HK; 10 Inia Toka – PR; 11 Jowasa Drodrolagi – SR; 12 Maika Serulevu – SR; 13 Waisea Nasekai – LK	14 Rupeni Korosaya – PR; 15 Osea Sadrau – PR; 16 Jeff Vatubua – SR; 17 Ratu Seru Cakobau – PR; 18 Timoci Namotokula – PR; 19 D'Rhys Miller – SR; 20 Joseph Ratuvakacereivalu – PR; 21 Junior Roqica – PR	Head coach: Brandon Costin; Legend: (c) Captain(s); (vc) Vice-captain(s); Updated: 8 October 2019; Source(s): APRLC

== Players ==
=== Captains ===
- Ratu Luke Nadurutalo (2019)

== Coaches ==
- Brandon Costin (2019–present)

== See also ==
- Fiji national rugby league team
- PNG Prime Minister's XIII
- Prime Minister's XIII
