= Waisale Vatubua =

Fiji dual-code rugby international footballer

Personal information
- Born: Fiji

Playing information

Rugby union
- Position: Wing
Representative
Years	Team	Pld	T	G	FG	P
1988	Fiji	2	2	0	0	8

Rugby league
- Position: Wing
Representative
Years	Team	Pld	T	G	FG	P
1995–96	Fiji	2	0	0	0	0
1996	Fiji Prime Minister's XIII	1	0	0	0	0

Waisale Vatubua is a Fijian rugby union and rugby league footballer who represented Fiji in rugby league at the 1995 World Cup.

In 1988 he played two rugby union test matches for Fiji (RU).

He also played in the Fiji Presidents XIII team v Great Britain on 2 October 1996 in Nadi
