= Hugo Savala =

England international rugby league footballer (born 2002)

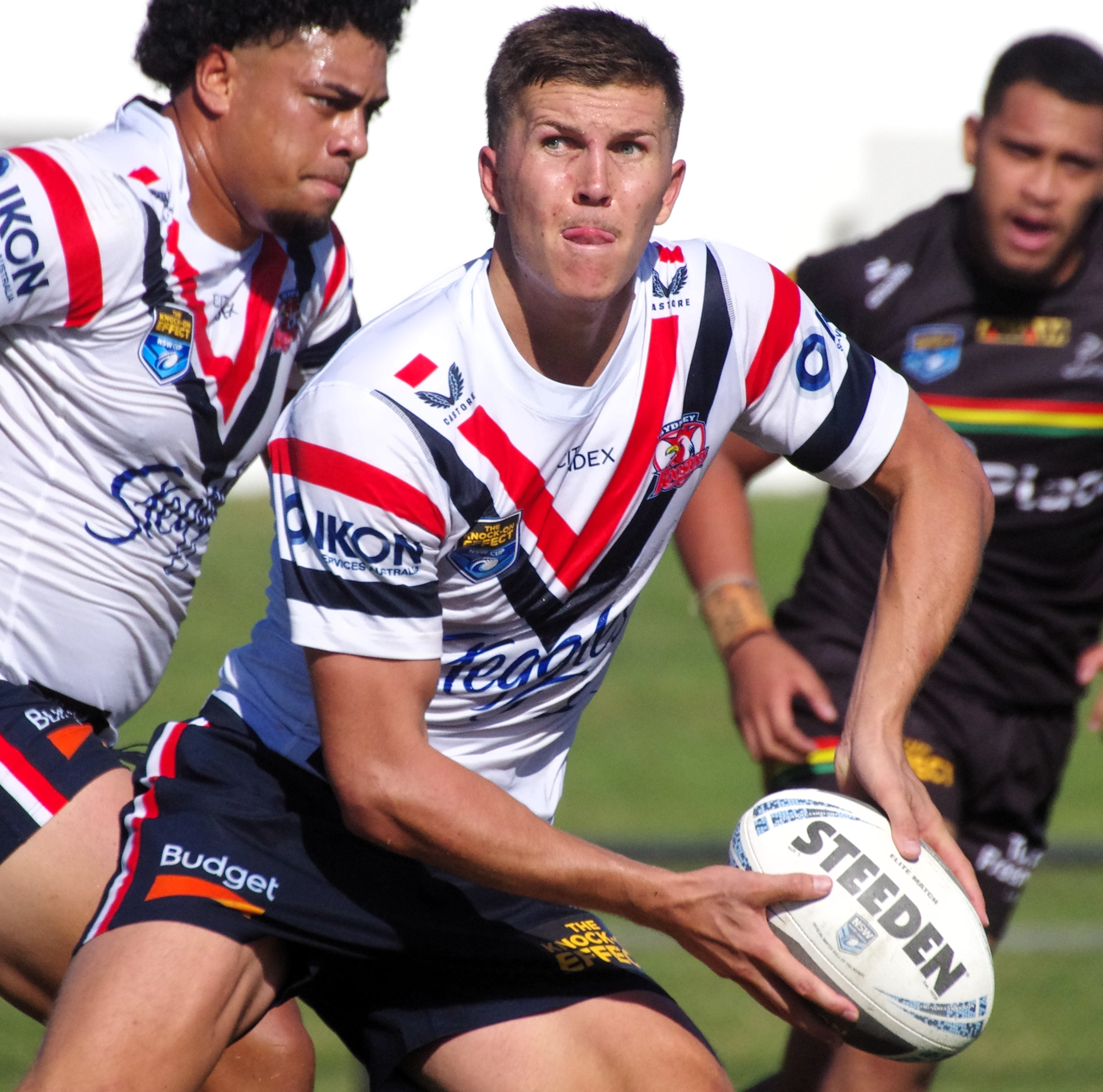

Personal information
- Full name: Hugo Savala
- Born: 8 April 2002 (age 24) Randwick, New South Wales, Australia
- Height: 194 cm (6 ft 4 in)
- Weight: 96 kg (15 st 2 lb)

Playing information
- Position: Centre, Halfback, Five-eighth
Club
Years	Team	Pld	T	G	FG	P
2025–	Sydney Roosters	43	12	22	0	92
Representative
Years	Team	Pld	T	G	FG	P
2026–	England	3	0	19	0	38
- Source: As of 10 November 2026

Hugo Savala (born 8 April 2002) is an England international rugby league footballer who plays as a centre, halfback or five-eighth for the Sydney Roosters in the National Rugby League.

== Early life ==
Savala was born in Randwick, Australia to a Scottish father and an English mother. Savala's maternal grandfather is Portuguese, and one of his paternal great-grandfathers is Polish. Savala's older brother Charlie plays rugby union professionally.

== Early career ==
Savala played his junior football for the Coogee Wombats, before joining the Sydney Roosters system. Savala attended the Scots College, playing for the 1st XV.

== Playing career ==
=== Sydney Roosters ===
In round 2 of the 2025 NRL season, Savala made his NRL debut against the Penrith Panthers at Commbank Stadium coming off the bench in a 38–32 win. In round 6 2025, Savala made his first NRL start at Halfback, replacing incumbent Chad Townsend against the Brisbane Broncos. Savala played 21 matches for the Sydney Roosters in the 2025 NRL season as the club finished 8th on the table and qualified for the finals. He played in the clubs elimination final loss against Cronulla.

On 26 July 2026, the Sydney Roosters announced that Savala re-signed with the club for a further two years. Savala played 22 matches for the Sydney Roosters in the 2026 NRL season. He was 18th man for their 2026 NRL Grand Final victory over Newcastle.

=== Representative ===
He made his England international début in the 2026 Rugby League World Cup 12-30 defeat to Tonga on 17 October 2026, scoring 2 goals.

== Statistics ==
Year	Team	Games	Tries	Goals	Pts
2025	Sydney Roosters	21	4	8	32
2026	Sydney Roosters	22	8	14	60
2027	Sydney Roosters				
	Totals	43	12	22	92
