= Rugby league in Fiji =

- Country: Fiji
- Governing body: Fiji National Rugby League
- National teams: Men's; Women's
- Nickname: Rakavi saumi
- First played: 1992

National competitions
- Fiji National Rugby League Competition

International competitions
- Rugby League World Cup; Four Nations

Rugby league is a popular team sport played in Fiji since 1992.

== History ==
Fiji's 1992 Rugby League
World Sevens squad
Niko Baleiverata
Alifereti Dere
Pio Kubuwai
Nemani Matirewa
Noa Nadruku
Livai Nalagilagi
Acura Niuqila
Jo Rabele
Pauliasi Tabulutu
Etuate Waqa
Manager: Culden Kamea

Joe Levula and Orisi Dawai were the first Fijians to play rugby league after they were recruited to play professionally for the Rochdale Hornets in 1961. Voate Driu and Laitia Ravouvou joined the club the next year, with numerous others following throughout the 1960s and 1970s. These players largely remained in Rochdale after their careers.

In 1992, a number of high-profile Fijian rugby union representatives converted to rugby league and entered the Rugby League World Sevens, for which they received lifetime bans from the Fiji Rugby Union. Under the guidance of Bob Abbott (from the Australian Rugby League), a six-team rugby league competition was established in Fiji later that same year. The competition used match payments to attract players from rugby union, with FJ$40 (AU$38) offered per win and FJ$10 per loss. The sport was supported by Sitiveni Rabuka, who served as President of the Fiji Rugby League (FRL) during that period.

The FRL aligned itself with the News Corp-backed Super League during the Super League war. Suva hosted the inaugural Super League World Nines in February 1996, which reportedly brought $1.3 million into the local economy. Under the Super League, the FRL grew from eight clubs with one team each to twelve clubs with two teams each. Abbott and the Australian Rugby League had meanwhile established a small competition in western Fiji.

2001 was the last year in which payments were offered to rugby league players in Fiji.

The first women's club rugby league match in the country was played on 26 March 2016, between Bemana and the Coastal Roos.

In 2020, the Kaiviti Silktails entered the NSWRL's third tier Ron Massey Cup, with entry to the second tier New South Wales Cup guaranteed for 2021. However, due to the COVID-19 pandemic, the plans were delayed by one year. The team draws its players from Fiji's local competition.

== Domestic Competitions ==
=== Vodafone Cup ===
The Fiji National Rugby League runs the national domestic rugby league competition in Fiji. Known as the Vodafone Cup, the competition features 32 teams across two conferences, each with two zones. The competition was formed in 1998, and has been Fiji's top level rugby league competition ever since.

==== Teams ====
Eastern Conference		Western Conference	
Nasinu Zone	Suva Zone	Koicalevu Zone	Navitilevu Zone
Cunningham Titans	Fiji Navy Albatross	Kainiyahawa Tigers	BA Eagles
Davuilevu Knights	Lami Steelers	Laselese Cowboys	Burenitu Cowboys
Kinoya Sea Eagles	Lovoni Titans	Nadi Eels	Police Sharks White
Kolimakawa Bulldogs	Nabua Broncos	Navatulevu Warriors	Namuaniwaqa Sea Eagles
Makoi Bulldogs	Police Sharks	Ravoravo Rabbitohs	Namoli West Tigers
Mataivalu	Serua Dragons	Sabeto Roosters	Saru Dragons
Nadera Panthers	Suva City Storm	West Coast Storms	Yasawa Saints
Veiyasana Knights	Topline Warriors		
USP Raiders	Vusu Raiders		

The FNRL Vodafone Cup is the top club competition for men's rugby league in Fiji.

It was previously divided into two conferences (East and West). The number of conferences has increased as the competition has grown.

24 teams took part in the 2020 Vodafone Cup. The 2022 season featured 30 teams.

==== Premiers ====
FNRL Men's Vodafone Cup Grand Finals
Year	Champions	Score	Runners-up	Venue	Ref.
1992	Nabua Broncos	?			
1993	Nadera Panthers	?			
1994	Nadera Panthers	?			
1995	Nadera Panthers	?			
1996	Nadera Panthers	?			
1997	Nadera Panthers	?			
1997	Coral Coast Cowboys	?			
1998	Nadera Panthers	?			
1999	Nausori Bulldogs	?			
2000	Lautoka Warriors	?			
2001	Nadera Panthers	?			
2002	QVS Sharks	?			
2003	Nadera Panthers	?			
2004	Nadera Panthers	?			
2005	Nadera Panthers	?			
2006	Nadera Panthers	?			
2007	Nadera Panthers	28–11	Nabua Broncos	HFC Bank Stadium, Suva	
2008	Nadera Panthers	14–12	Nabua Broncos	HFC Bank Stadium, Suva	
2009	?	?			
2010	Sabeto Roosters	15–14	Saru Dragons	HFC Bank Stadium, Suva	
2011	Nadera Panthers	22–18	Namatakula Tigers	HFC Bank Stadium, Suva	
2012	Makoi Bulldogs	12–10	Sabeto Roosters	HFC Bank Stadium, Suva	
2013	Sabeto Roosters	27–18	Saru Dragons	Churchill Park, Lautoka	
2014	Saru Dragons	20–18	Makoi Bulldogs	Churchill Park, Lautoka	
2015	Sabeto Roosters	16–6	Nabua Broncos	HFC Bank Stadium, Suva	
2016	Police Sharks	18–10	Burenitu Cowboys	Prince Charles Park, Nadi	
2017	Sabeto Roosters	12–8	Ravoravo Rabbitohs	Prince Charles Park, Nadi	
2018	Ravoravo Rabbitohs	16–14	Police Sharks	Lawaqa Park, Sigatoka	
2019	Ravoravo Rabbitohs	22–10	Army Bears	Churchill Park, Lautoka	
2020	Police Sharks	18–16*	Coastline Roos	Albert Park, Suva	
2021	Season cancelled due to the COVID-19 pandemic.				
2022	Nadera Panthers	16–10	Saru Dragons	Lawaqa Park, Sigatoka	
2025	Namuaniwaqa Sea Eagles	32-20	Vusu Raiders	HFC Bank Stadium, Suva	

FNRL Women's Vodafone Cup Grand Finals
Year	Champions	Score	Runners-up	Venue	Ref.
2022	Police Sharks	32–16	Lami Steelers	Lawaqa Park, Sigatoka	
2023	USP Raiders	14–12	Police Blues	Albert Park, Suva	

An * indicates that the match was decided in extra time.

=== Inter-Zone Championship ===
The Inter-Zone Championship was created in 2016. The teams were made up of the strongest players from the Vodafone Cup. The men's and U20's competition was first held in 2016, while the women's competition was introduced in 2017.

Each Zone plays each other over 5 weeks before semi finals and a final is played.

Men's Inter-Zone Championship Finals
Year	Champions	Score	Runners-up	Venue	Ref.
2016	Nadi Aviators	38–30	Suva Eagles	Ratu Cakobau Park, Nausori	
2017	Nadi Aviators	20–18	Nasinu Titans	Lawaqa Park, Sigatoka	

Women's Inter-Zone Championship Finals
Year	Champions	Score	Runners-up	Venue	Ref.
2017	Lautoka Crusaders	26–24	Nodroga Knights	Lawaqa Park, Sigatoka	

=== Melanesian Club Championship ===
The Melanesian Club Championship has been contested by the Fijian champions (at either club or zone level) and the winner of Papua New Guinea's Digicel Cup since 2015.

Date	Fiji team	Result	PNG team	Venue	Ref.
10 October 2015	Sabeto Roosters	Lost 2–42	Agmark Gurias	Sir John Guise Stadium, Port Moresby	
18 February 2017	Nadi Aviators	Lost 4–40	Lae Snax Tigers	Lawaqa Park, Sigatoka	
24 February 2018	Nadi Aviators	Lost 22–38	Lae Snax Tigers	PNG Football Stadium, Port Moresby	
29 February 2020	Ravoravo Rabbitohs	Lost 8–32	Lae Snax Tigers	Churchill Park, Lautoka	

== Media coverage ==
As early as 1993, one Winfield Cup match was being broadcast on Fijian television per week.

In 2016, the Fiji Times partnered with the FNRL to become the official newspaper of rugby league in the country.

Beginning in 2018, two NRL matches are broadcast live on free-to-air television each weekend by FBC TV.

== National teams ==
The men's national team, known as the Bati, was formed in 1992 and have competed at 5 Rugby League World Cups (1995, 2000, 2008, 2013, and 2017). They achieved their best result as semi-finalists on three occasions, in 2008, 2013, and 2017.

The women's national team, known as the Bulikula, was reformed in 2018 and played a full international against Papua New Guinea the following year.

== Notable players ==
This is a list of players from the domestic FNRL competition in Fiji who have played in a top-tier professional rugby league competition i.e. the NRL or the Super League.

- Sisa Waqa (Nadera Panthers)
- Pio Seci (Nabua Broncos)
- Tikiko Noke (Lautoka Crushers)
- Vuate Karawalevu (Naitasiri Rugby)
- Ilaitia Tagituimua (Nadera Panthers)
- Viliame Kikau (Marist Brothers)

== See also ==
- Fiji National Rugby League
- Fiji National Rugby League competition
