= Jowasa Drodrolagi =

Fiji and France international rugby league footballer

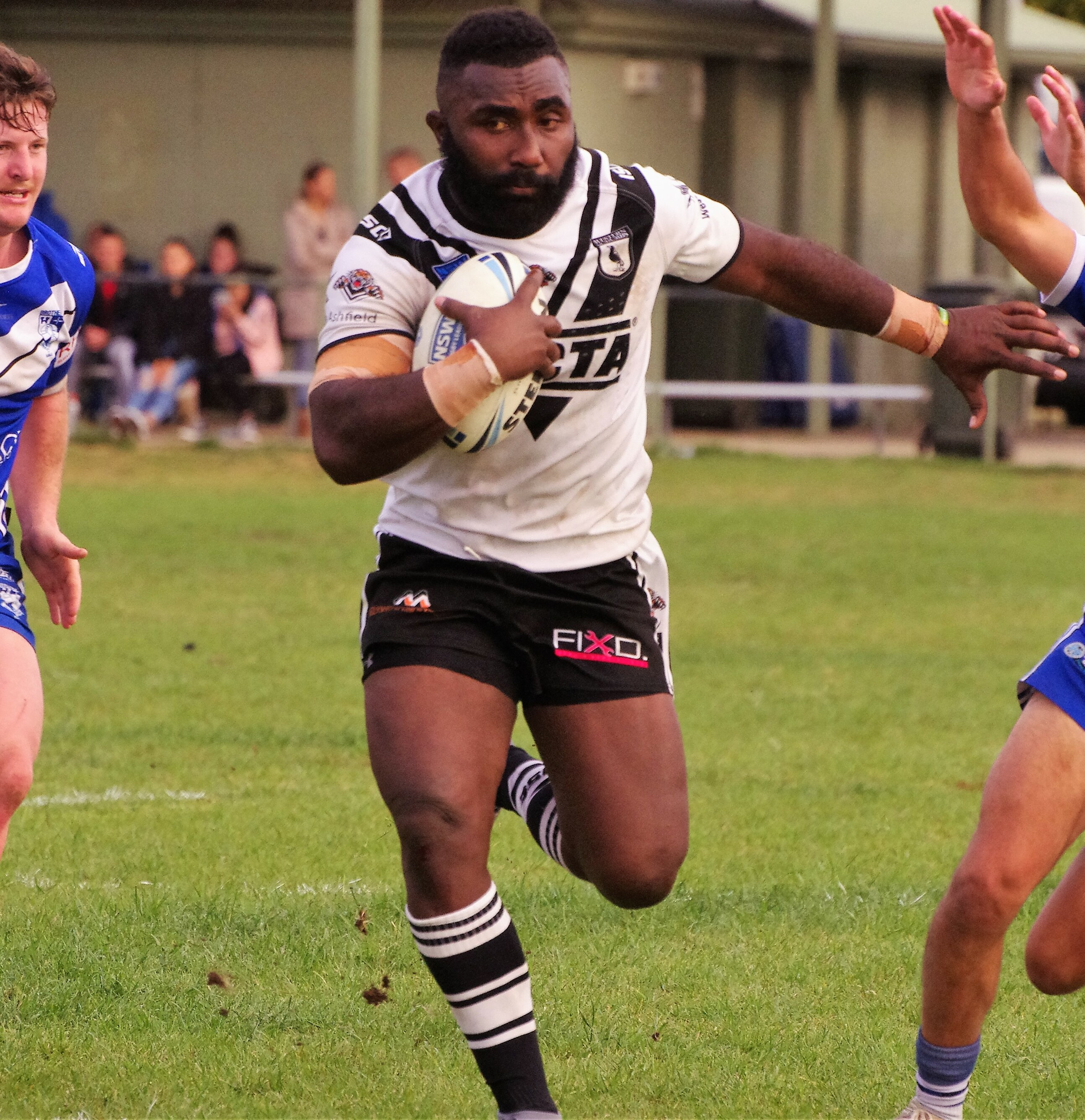

Personal information
- Full name: Ratu Jowasa Tubailagi Drodrolagi
- Born: 12 April 1995 (age 31) Ekubu, Vatulele, Fiji
- Height: 5 ft 11 in (1.80 m)
- Weight: 16 st 5 lb (104 kg)

Playing information
- Position: Loose forward, Prop
Club
Years	Team	Pld	T	G	FG	P
2020–	AS Carcassonne	71	7	0	0	28
Representative
Years	Team	Pld	T	G	FG	P
2019	Fiji Prime Minister's XIII	1	0	0	0	0
2022	Fiji	1	0	0	0	0
2026	France	1	0	0	0	0
- Source: As of 1 November 2026

Jowasa Drodrolagi (born 12 April 1995) is a professional rugby league footballer who plays as a loose forward and prop for AS Carcassonne in the Elite One Championship. He has played for both Fiji and France at international level.

== Background ==
He was born in Ekubu, Vatulele, Fiji.

Drodrolagi played for the Nabua Broncos as a junior.

== Club career ==
He played for the Fiji Residents side whilst still in school.

Drodrolagi also played for the Glebe Dirty Reds in the Ron Massey Cup and the Newtown Jets and the Western Suburbs Magpies in the New South Wales Cup.

He joined the newly created from Kaiviti Silktails in the Ron Massey Cup.

Drodrolagi was contracted to Whitehaven on a short-term contract in 2022.

== International career ==
Drodrolagi was named in Fiji Bati squads as far back as 2016.

In October 2022 Drodrolagi was named in the Fiji squad for the 2021 Rugby League World Cup.

He was named in the match-day squad to play against Australia in Fiji's opening match of the World Cup at Headingley Stadium in Leeds.

On 1 October 2026 he was named in the 2026 France World Cup squad

He made his France international début in the 24-20 defeat to Lebanon on 1 November 2024 in the 2026 Rugby League World Cup.
