= Fabian Goodall =

Fiji international rugby league footballer

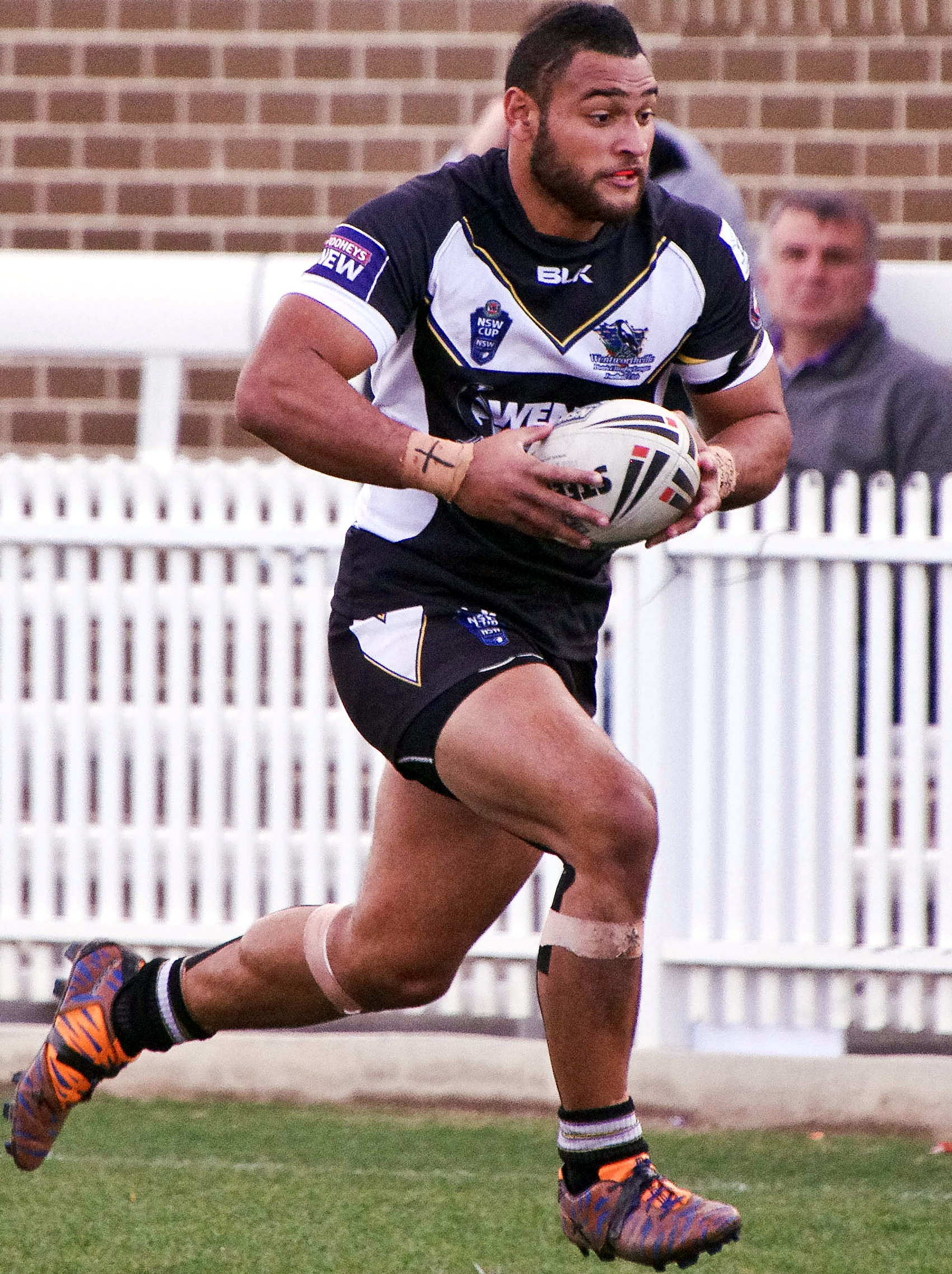

Personal information
- Born: 13 December 1994 (age 31) Sydney, Australia
- Height: 188 cm (6 ft 2 in)
- Weight: 110 kg (17 st 5 lb)

Playing information

Rugby league
- Position: Centre, Wing
Club
Years	Team	Pld	T	G	FG	P
2016	Manly Sea Eagles	0	0	0	0	0
Representative
Years	Team	Pld	T	G	FG	P
2014–16	Fiji	3	2	0	0	8

Rugby union
Club
Years	Team	Pld	T	G	FG	P
2016	Rams	2	0	0	0	0
2022–23	Toronto Arrows	9	4	0	0	0
	Total	11	4	0	0	0
- Source: As of 5 March 2024

Fabian Goodall (born 13 December 1994) is a Fijian professional rugby league and rugby union player. He recently returned from Toronto, Canada after playing in the MLR for the Toronto Arrows. Fabian is currently playing for Western Sydney Two Blues in the Shute Shield Competition, Goodall is a Fiji representative.

== Background ==
Born in Sydney, Goodall is of Fijian descent. Goodall played his junior football for the Wentworthville Magpies. He attended The Hills Sports High School before being signed by the Manly-Warringah Sea Eagles. Goodall played for the Sea Eagles NYC side in 2012 when he was also selected into Laure Daley's "Blues in Waiting" Origin Pathways Squad. In late 2012 Goodall signed with the Parramatta Eels, playing in the Eels NYC team in 2013 and 2014. He was named in the Junior Kiwis train on squad in 2013, failing to make the final team to play the Junior Kangaroos. He moved to the Eels New South Wales Cup team the Wentworthville Magpies in 2015.

== Playing career ==
In October 2014, Goodall made his International début as he was selected to play for Fiji in the 2014 Hayne/Mannah Cup test match against Lebanon at Remondis Stadium.

On 2 May 2015, Goodall played in 2015 Melanesian Cup match against Papua New Guinea, playing at centre and scoring an intercept try in Fiji's 22–10 win at Cbus Super Stadium.

On 7 May 2016, Goodall played for Fiji against Papua New Guinea in the 2016 Melanesian Cup where he played in the second row position in the 24–22 loss at Parramatta Stadium.

== Switch to rugby union ==
In August 2016, Goodall made the switch from league to union after signing with National Rugby Championship (NRC) side, Western Sydney Rams. Goodall was part of the grand final winning team in the Shute Shield in season 2024 playing at inside centre, scoring a try.
