= Fiji National Rugby League =

Governing body for rugby league in Fiji

- Founded: 1992
- IRL affiliation: 1998
- APRL affiliation: 2010 (full; founder)
- Responsibility: Fiji
- Headquarters: Suva
- Key people: Aporosa Lutunauga (Chair); Akuila Masi (Chief Executive)
- Men's coach: Waisake Kativerata
- Women's coach: Josaia Rabele Dakuitoga
- Website: fijibati.com

(Fiji)
- As of 21 April 2021

The Fiji National Rugby League (FNRL) is the governing body for rugby league in Fiji. They are based in the capital Suva.

== History ==
The FNRL was founded in 1992 and have been full members of the Rugby League International Federation since its formation in 1998. They have also been a full member of the Asia-Pacific Rugby League Confederation since its formation in 2010. The original formation in 1992 was organised by two local businessmen Culden Kamea and Tony Ahkoy.The original six team competition was funded by the Sharp Corporation which sponsored their entry into a World Sevens Rugby League Cup in Sydney Australia where they won the Bowl. On return to Fiji a six team competition was formed with ex Rugby Union players once again sponsored by the Japanese Sharp Corporation. In the following year Mike Deniss coached and managed a tour of Queensland country playing 3 matches and finally gaining support from the ARL and World RL through Bob Abbott and Authurson.

== See also ==
- Rugby league in Fiji
- Fiji National Rugby League competition
- Fiji national rugby league team
- Fiji women's national rugby league team
