= Fiji National Rugby League competition =

National domestic rugby competition in Fiji

Fiji National Rugby League Competition
- Sport: Rugby league
- Instituted: 1992
- Inaugural season: 1992
- Number of teams: 16
- Premiers: Nadera Panthers (2022)
- Most titles: Nadera Panthers (15 titles)
- Website: fijibati.com

The Fiji National Rugby League runs the national domestic rugby league competition in Fiji. Known as the Vodafone Cup, the competition features 32 teams across two conferences, each with two zones. The competition was formed in 1998, and has been Fiji's top level rugby league competition ever since.

The Sabeto Roosters are the current Premier Grade champions. The West Fiji Dolphins are reigning champions at Under 16 level.

== Teams ==
| Eastern Conference | | Western Conference | |
| Nasinu Zone | Suva Zone | Koicalevu Zone | Navitilevu Zone |
|---|---|---|---|
| Cunningham Titans | Fiji Navy Albatross | Kainiyahawa Tigers | BA Eagles |
| Davuilevu Knights | Lami Steelers | Laselese Cowboys | Burenitu Cowboys |
| Kinoya Sea Eagles | Lovoni Titans | Nadi Eels | Police Sharks White |
| Kolimakawa Bulldogs | Nabua Broncos | Navatulevu Warriors | Namuaniwaqa Sea Eagles |
| Makoi Bulldogs | Police Sharks | Ravoravo Rabbitohs | Namoli West Tigers |
| Mataivalu | Serua Dragons | Sabeto Roosters | Saru Dragons |
| Nadera Panthers | Suva City Storm | West Coast Storms | Yasawa Saints |
| Veiyasana Knights | Topline Warriors | | |
| USP Raiders | Vusu Raiders | | |

== Premiers ==
FNRL Men's Vodafone Cup Grand Finals
| Year | Champions | Score | Runners-up | Venue | Ref. |
|---|---|---|---|---|---|
| 1992 | Nabua Broncos | ? | | | |
| 1993 | Nadera Panthers | ? | | | |
| 1994 | Nadera Panthers | ? | | | |
| 1995 | Nadera Panthers | ? | | | |
| 1996 | Nadera Panthers | ? | | | |
| 1997 | Nadera Panthers | ? | | | |
| 1997 | Coral Coast Cowboys | ? | | | |
| 1998 | Nadera Panthers | ? | | | |
| 1999 | Nausori Bulldogs | ? | | | |
| 2000 | Lautoka Warriors | ? | | | |
| 2001 | Nadera Panthers | ? | | | |
| 2002 | QVS Sharks | ? | | | |
| 2003 | Nadera Panthers | ? | | | |
| 2004 | Nadera Panthers | ? | | | |
| 2005 | Nadera Panthers | ? | | | |
| 2006 | Nadera Panthers | ? | | | |
| 2007 | Nadera Panthers | 28–11 | Nabua Broncos | HFC Bank Stadium, Suva | |
| 2008 | Nadera Panthers | 14–12 | Nabua Broncos | HFC Bank Stadium, Suva | |
| 2009 | ? | ? | | | |
| 2010 | Sabeto Roosters | 15–14 | Saru Dragons | HFC Bank Stadium, Suva | |
| 2011 | Nadera Panthers | 22–18 | Namatakula Tigers | HFC Bank Stadium, Suva | |
| 2012 | Makoi Bulldogs | 12–10 | Sabeto Roosters | HFC Bank Stadium, Suva | |
| 2013 | Sabeto Roosters | 27–18 | Saru Dragons | Churchill Park, Lautoka | |
| 2014 | Saru Dragons | 20–18 | Makoi Bulldogs | Churchill Park, Lautoka | |
| 2015 | Sabeto Roosters | 16–6 | Nabua Broncos | HFC Bank Stadium, Suva | |
| 2016 | Police Sharks | 18–10 | Burenitu Cowboys | Prince Charles Park, Nadi | |
| 2017 | Sabeto Roosters | 12–8 | Ravoravo Rabbitohs | Prince Charles Park, Nadi | |
| 2018 | Ravoravo Rabbitohs | 16–14 | Police Sharks | Lawaqa Park, Sigatoka | |
| 2019 | Ravoravo Rabbitohs | 22–10 | Army Bears | Churchill Park, Lautoka | |
| 2020 | Police Sharks | 18–16* | Coastline Roos | Albert Park, Suva | |
| 2021 | Season cancelled due to the COVID-19 pandemic. | | | | |
| 2022 | Nadera Panthers | 16–10 | Saru Dragons | Lawaqa Park, Sigatoka | |

== See also ==
- Fiji women's national rugby league team
- Fiji National Rugby League
- Rugby league in Fiji
- Fiji national rugby league team
