= Queensland under-18 rugby league team =

Australian youth rugby league team

Queensland Under-18
Team information
- Nickname: Maroons
- Governing body: Queensland Rugby League
- Head coach: Kurt Richards
- Captain: Josh James
- Top try-scorer: Kirisome Auva'a; Fanitesi Niu; Caleb Timu (2)
- Top point-scorer: Josh James; Josh Fauid (10)
- Home stadium: Suncorp Stadium (52,500)

Uniforms
First colours

Team results
- First game
- New South Wales 34–12 Queensland (Suncorp Stadium, Brisbane; 11 June 2008)
- Biggest win
- Queensland 34–12 New South Wales (Suncorp Stadium, Brisbane; 5 June 2019)
- Biggest defeat
- New South Wales 56–6 Queensland (Suncorp Stadium, Brisbane; 26 June 2013)

The Queensland Under-18 rugby league team, also known as Queensland Under-18s or Queensland U18, represents Queensland in the sport of rugby league at an under-18 age level. Since 2008, the team has played an annual fixture against the New South Wales Under-18 team as a curtain raiser to a State of Origin game. The team features players selected from Queensland's premier under-18 rugby league competition, the Mal Meninga Cup. They are administered by the Queensland Rugby League.

== History ==
Prior to 2008, junior interstate matches were contested at under-17 and under-19 levels. In 2008, with the advent of the National Youth Competition, the age levels switched to an under-16 and under-18 format to keep in line with the NSWRL's existing SG Ball Cup and Harold Matthews Cup competitions and the QRL's Mal Meninga Cup and Cyril Connell Cup competitions, which would begin in 2009.

Queensland suffered defeat in the first four under-18 Origin fixtures, not winning a game until 2012. The 2012 team, which featured future NRL players Anthony Milford, Kodi Nikorima and Lloyd Perrett, held on to defeat New South Wales 24–18 at ANZ Stadium in Sydney. Queensland would suffer two more defeats in 2013 and 2014 before picking up their second win in 2015, defeating New South Wales 22–18 at the Melbourne Cricket Ground. Queensland snapped a three-game losing streak with a victory in 2019.

== Players ==
Players selected for the Queensland under-18 team are usually contracted with a National Rugby League (NRL) side but play in either the Mal Meninga Cup, Hastings Deering Colts, Jersey Flegg Cup or Intrust Super Cup competitions. In 2008, before the Mal Meninga Cup began, players were selected from the under-18 representative carnival in Proserpine. Each pre-season the Queensland Rugby League will select an under-18 squad featuring players in contention for the mid-season fixture. The squad participates in a weekend camp at the Queensland Academy of Sport.

=== 2020 squad ===
The 34-man training squad selected for the 2020 season:

Name	Position	Club
Lachlan Adamson	Hooker	Burleigh Bears
Ediq Ambrosyev	Hooker	Tweed Heads Seagulls
Jake Baigrie	Second-row	CQ Capras
Jake Bourke	Five-eighth	Townsville Blackhawks
Blake Cesari	Centre	Western Mustangs
Abai Chatfield-Mooka	Prop	Townsville Blackhawks
Jayden Clarkson	Prop	Canberra Raiders
Selwyn Cobbo	Centre	Wynnum Manly Seagulls
Caleb Esera	Second-row	Canberra Raiders
Grand Hagai	Wing	Newcastle Knights
Riley Hall	Prop	CQ Capras
Israel Higgins	Centre	Tweed Heads Seagulls
Jack Howarth	Second-row	Easts Tigers
Jayden Hunt	Centre	Norths Devils
Peyton Jenkins	Halfback	CQ Capras
Ezra Mam	Five-eighth	Souths-Logan Magpies
Jeremiah Nanai	Second-row	Townsville Blackhawks
Shaun Packer	Hooker	Western Mustangs
Byron Parnell	Centre	South Sydney Rabbitohs
Brendan Piakura	Second-row	Tweed Heads Seagulls
Braythen Porter	Prop	Norths Devils
John Radel	Prop	Wynnum Manly Seagulls
Tyrone Sa'U	Fullback	Parramatta Eels
Xavier Savage	Centre	Canberra Raiders
Samuel Shannon	Prop	Burleigh Bears
Damon Somerville	Second-row	Burleigh Bears
Brocco Uhrle	Prop	Newcastle Knights
Xavier Va'A	Prop	Western Mustangs
Isaiah Vailalo	Prop	Townsville Blackhawks
Keegan Vandenberg	Centre	Canberra Raiders
Sam Walker	Halfback	Sydney Roosters
Reece Walsh	Fullback	Tweed Heads Seagulls
Ragarive Wavik	Fullback	Townsville Blackhawks
Keanu Wright-Dunrobin	Five-eighth	Western Mustangs

=== Notable players ===
Since 2008, twenty-two former Queensland under-18 players have gone onto represent Queensland at State of Origin level:

- Jai Arrow
- Patrick Carrigan
- Xavier Coates
- Reuben Cotter
- Tom Dearden
- Tino Fa'asuamaleaui
- David Fifita
- Dane Gagai
- Tom Gilbert
- Coen Hess
- Valentine Holmes
- Ben Hunt
- Ethan Lowe
- Andrew McCullough
- Josh McGuire
- Anthony Milford
- Michael Morgan
- Justin O'Neill
- Joe Ofahengaue
- Josh Papalii
- Hamiso Tabuai-Fidow
- Murray Taulagi

== Results ==
=== 2008 ===
Played as a curtain raiser to Game II of the 2008 State of Origin series.

11 June 2008

Queensland U18	12 – 34	New South Wales U18
Tries; Gerard Beale 1 Pat O'Hanlon 1 Goals; Jordan Rankin 2	Report	Tries; Matthew Wright 3 Lachlan Coote 1 Albert Kelly 1 Mitchel Johnson 1 Goals; Lachlan Coote 5

Suncorp Stadium, Brisbane

Queensland under-18
2008 team		Coaching staff
1 Daniel Vidot – FB; 2 Ryan Tongia – WG; 3 Gerard Beale – CE; 4 Jack Cooper – CE; 5 Will Tupou – WG; 6 Lachlan Creighton – FE; 7 Ben Hunt – HB; 8 Josh McGuire – PR; 9 Jake Friend – HK; 10 Andrew Clayton – PR; 11 Pat O'Hanlon – SR; 12 Chris Faust – SR; 13 Andrew McCullough – LK	14 Jordan Rankin – FE; 15 Sam Mataora – PR; 16 Jake Seaton – PR; 17 Kurtis Lingwoodock – SR	Head coach: Gary Greinke; Legend: (c) Captain(s); (vc) Vice-captain(s); Updated: 16 January 2016; Source(s): NYCDB

=== 2009 ===
Played as a curtain raiser to Game II of the 2009 State of Origin series.

24 June 2009

New South Wales U18	24 – 6	Queensland U18
Tries; Josh Portlock 2 Nathan Massey 1 Joseph Roqoko 1 Goals; Chad Townsend 4	Report	Tries; Michael Morgan 1 Goals; Jordan Rankin 1

ANZ Stadium, Sydney
Referee: Robert Brown

Queensland under-18
2009 team		Coaching staff
1 Lachlan Maranta – FB; 2 Dane Gagai – WG; 3 Michael Parker-Walshe – CE; 4 Justin O'Neill – CE; 5 Josh Jerome – WG; 6 Michael Morgan – FE; 7 Jordan Rankin (c) – HB; 8 Luke Page – PR; 9 Kurt Baptiste – HK; 10 Jake Seaton – PR; 11 Chris McLean – SR; 12 Korbin Sims – SR; 13 Pat O'Hanlon – LK	14 Garry Riccardi – SR; 15 Joshua Rose – PR; 16 Leon Taylor – SR; 17 Ethan Lowe – SR	Head coach: Dennis Moore; Legend: (c) Captain(s); (vc) Vice-captain(s); Updated: 16 January 2016; Source(s): NYCDB

=== 2010 ===
Played as a curtain raiser to Game II of the 2010 State of Origin series.

16 June 2010

Queensland U18	18 – 22	New South Wales U18
Tries; Kirisome Auva'a 2 Lachlan Maranta 1 Aaron Whitchurch 1 Goals; Kyle Feldt 1		Tries; Lachlan Burr 1 Nathan Green 1 Alex McKinnon 1 Goals; Jacob Miller 1

Suncorp Stadium, Brisbane
Referee: Peter Gough

Queensland under-18
2010 team		Coaching staff
1 Alex Elisala – FB; 2 Maipele Morseu – WG; 3 Kyle Feldt – CE; 4 Aaron Whitchurch – CE; 5 Lachlan Maranta – WG; 6 Bryce Hegarty – FE; 7 Louis Frisby (c) – HB; 8 Cale Hobday – PR; 9 Jay Lobwein – HK; 10 Korbin Sims – PR; 11 Josh Papalii – SR; 12 Chris Binge – SR; 13 Benn Malley – LK	14 Ben Hampton – HB; 15 Chris Grevsmuhl – LK; 16 Kirisome Auva'a – CE; 17 Daniel Beasley – PR	Head coach: Jon Buchanan; Legend: (c) Captain(s); (vc) Vice-captain(s); Updated: 16 January 2016; Source(s): NYCDB

=== 2011 ===
Played as a curtain raiser to Game II of the 2011 State of Origin series.

15 June 2011

New South Wales U18	16 – 6	Queensland U18
Tries; Sam Coster 1 Michael Lichaa 1 Kyle Lovett 1 Goals; Curtis Sironen 2		Tries; Tautau Moga 1 Goals; Anthony Gadd 1

ANZ Stadium, Sydney

Queensland under-18
2011 team		Coaching staff
1 Zac Santo – FB; 2 Mitch Ardler – WG; 3 Tautau Moga – CE; 4 Rian Diffey – CE; 5 Matthew Berwick – WG; 6 Luke Abdul-Rahman – FE; 7 Kurt Mann – HB; 8 Chris Grevsmuhl – PR; 9 Cameron Cullen – HK; 10 Stephen Coombe (c) – PR; 11 Jack Kelleher – SR; 12 Iain Riccardi – SR; 13 Caleb Binge – LK	14 Daniel Alvaro – PR; 15 Hymel Hunt – CE; 16 Anthony Gadd – SR; 17 Francis Molo – PR	Head coach: Brendan Lam; Legend: (c) Captain(s); (vc) Vice-captain(s); Updated: 16 January 2016; Source(s): LU

=== 2012 ===
Played as a curtain raiser to Game III of the 2012 State of Origin series.

4 July 2012

New South Wales U18	18 – 24	Queensland U18
Tries; Mitchell Moses 1 Tyrone Phillips 1 Jake Trbojevic 1 Goals; Clinton Gutherson 3	Report	Tries; Caleb Timu 2 Luke Bateman 1 Patrick Kaufusi 1 Goals; Anthony Milford 4

ANZ Stadium, Sydney
Referee: Matt Noyen

Queensland under-18
2012 team		Coaching staff
1 Jono Kent – FB; 2 Dwayne Duncan – WG; 3 Connor Broadhurst – CE; 4 Brenko Lee – CE; 5 Soape Palau – WG; 6 Kodi Nikorima – FE; 7 Anthony Milford – HB; 8 Lloyd Perrett – PR; 9 Kierran Moseley – HK; 10 Patrick Kaufusi – PR; 11 Tuiala Togitasi – SR; 12 Caleb Timu – SR; 13 Luke Bateman – LK	14 Dan Clarke – HK; 15 Scott Doyle – SR; 16 Francis Molo – PR; 17 Corey Jensen – SR	Head coach: Kevin Carmichael; Legend: (c) Captain(s); (vc) Vice-captain(s); Updated: 16 January 2016; Source(s): NRL.com

=== 2013 ===
Played as a curtain raiser to Game II of the 2013 State of Origin series.

26 June 2013

Queensland U18	6 – 56	New South Wales U18
Tries; Ellery Tusa 1 Goals; Jayden Nikorima 1	Report	Tries; Dallin Watene-Zelezniak 3 Jackson Hastings 2 Alex Johnston 2 Sione Mata'utia 2 Zach Dockar-Clay 1 Michael Morgan 1 Goals; Jackson Hastings 6

Suncorp Stadium, Brisbane
Referee: Michael Gordon

Queensland under-18
2013 team		Coaching staff
1 Valentine Holmes – FB; 2 Paul Byrnes – WG; 3 Ellery Tusa – CE; 4 Shaun Hudson – CE; 5 Elijah Alick – WG; 6 Jayden Nikorima – FE; 7 Duncan Paia'aua – HB; 8 Luke Bateman (c) – PR; 9 Jayden Berrell – HK; 10 Joe Ofahengaue – PR; 11 Alex Barr – SR; 12 Richard Skelton – SR; 13 Jai Arrow – LK	14 Chris Ostwald – HK; 15 Harry Pondekas – SR; 16 Kieran Quabba – LK; 17 Andrew Niemoeller – SR	Head coach: Anthony Seibold; Legend: (c) Captain(s); (vc) Vice-captain(s); Updated: 16 January 2016; Source(s): QRL.com.au

=== 2014 ===
Played as a curtain raiser to Game II of the 2014 State of Origin series.

18 June 2014

New South Wales U18	24 – 10	Queensland U18
Tries; Matthew Dufty 2 Lachlan Croker 1 Latrell Mitchell 1 Tom Trbojevic 1 Goals; Jackson Hastings 2	Report	Tries; Lindsay Collins 1 Kieran Duffin 1 Goals; Cooper Bambling 1

ANZ Stadium, Sydney
Referee: Liam Nicholls

Queensland under-18
2014 team		Coaching staff
1 Joseph Burchell – FB; 2 Riva Pati – WG; 3 Elijah Alick – CE; 4 Junior Taefu – CE; 5 Gideon Gela-Mosby – WG; 6 Lachlan Lewis – FE; 7 Cooper Bambling (c) – HB; 8 Lindsay Collins – PR; 9 Jake Turpin – HK; 10 George Fai – PR; 11 Regan Grieve (c) – SR; 12 Coen Hess – SR; 13 Kieran Duffin – LK	14 Ross Bella – LK; 15 Sam Lavea – PR; 16 Charlie Galo – SR; 17 Keegan Hipgrave – PR	Head coach: Anthony Seibold; Legend: (c) Captain(s); (vc) Vice-captain(s); Updated: 16 January 2016; Source(s): QRL.com.au

=== 2015 ===
Played as a curtain raiser to Game II of the 2015 State of Origin series.

17 June 2015

New South Wales U18	18 – 22	Queensland U18
Tries; Ryan Papenhuyzen 1 Curtis Scott 1 Reimis Smith 1 Goals; Brock Lamb 3	Report	Tries; Joshua Fauid 1 Tristan Hope 1 Thomas Mikaele 1 Jaydn Su'A 1 Goals; Joshua Fauid 3

MCG, Melbourne
Referee: Jarrod Cole

Queensland under-18
2015 team		Coaching staff
1 Gehamat Shibasaki – FB; 2 Enari Tuala – WG; 3 Keena Yorston – CE; 4 Bacho Salam – CE; 5 Bernard Lewis – WG; 6 Mitchell Dunn – FE; 7 Josh Fauid – HB; 8 Keegan Hipgrave (c) – PR; 9 Reuben Cotter – HK; 10 Kenau Dawson – PR; 11 Jaydn Su'a – SR; 12 Michael Molo – SR; 13 Lachlan Laskey – LK	14 Tristan Hope – HK; 15 Thomas Mikaele – PR; 16 Keenan Palasia – SR; 17 Cameron Torpy – PR	Head coach: Anthony Seibold; Legend: (c) Captain(s); (vc) Vice-captain(s); Updated: 16 January 2016; Source(s): QRL.com.au

=== 2017 ===
Played as a curtain raiser to Game II of the 2017 State of Origin series.

21 June 2017

New South Wales U18	35 – 28	Queensland U18
Tries; Luke Metcalf 3 Sebastian Kris 2 Ethan Parry 1 Goals; Zac Lomax 5 Field Goals; Zac Lomax 1	Report	Tries; Logan Bayliss-Brow 1 Eddie Blacker 1 Ronaldo Mulitalo 1 Treymain Spry 1 Murray Taulagi 1 Goals; Travis Turnbull 4 Field Goals

ANZ Stadium, Sydney
Referee: Darian Furner

Queensland under-18
2017 team		Coaching staff
1 Travis Turnbull – FB; 2 Treymain Spry – WG; 3 Murray Taulagi – CE; 4 Ronaldo Mulitalo – CE; 5 Kea Pere – WG; 6 Cory Paix – FE; 7 Tanah Boyd – HB; 8 Logan Bayliss-Brow – PR; 9 Tyson Smoothy (c) – HK; 10 Eddie Blacker – PR; 11 Brandon Russell – SR; 12 J'maine Hopgood – SR; 13 Reihana Marsh – LK	14 Kyle Paterson – HK; 15 Tino Fa'asuamaleaui – LK; 16 Garrett Smith – PR; 17 Tom Gilbert – SR	Head coach: Josh Hannay; Legend: (c) Captain(s); (vc) Vice-captain(s); Updated: 12 June 2017; Source(s): QRL.com.au

=== 2018 ===
Played as a curtain raiser to Game I of the 2018 State of Origin series.

6 June 2018

New South Wales U18	16 – 10	Queensland U18
Tries: Bronson Xerri 1 Jason Saab 1 Stefano Utoikamanu 1 Goals: Jock Madden 2	1st: 0 – 6; 2nd: 16 – 4	Tries: 1 Tino Fa'asuamaleaui; 1 David Fifita Goals: 1 Tanah Boyd

MCG, Melbourne
Referee: Keiren Irons

Queensland under-18
2018 team		Coaching staff
1 McKenzie Baker – FB; 2 Sebastian Winters-Chang – WG; 3 Jack Paterson – CE; 4 Ioane Seiuli – CE; 5 Xavier Coates – WG; 6 Tanah Boyd – FE; 7 Tom Dearden – HB; 8 Garrett Smith – PR; 9 Cory Paix – HK; 10 Ethan Bullemor – PR; 11 Tino Fa'asuamaleaui – SR; 12 David Fifita (c) – SR; 13 Tom Gilbert – LK	14 Tesi Niu – FB; 15 Geordie Brand – PR; 16 David Butler – PR; 17 Blake Campbell – SR	Head coach: Kurt Richards; Legend: (c) Captain(s); (vc) Vice-captain(s); Updated: 6 June 2018; Source(s): QRL.com.au

=== 2019 ===
Played as a curtain raiser to Game I of the 2019 State of Origin series.

5 June 2019

Queensland U18	34 – 12	New South Wales U18
Tries: Fanitesi Niu 2 Xavier Coates 1 Alofiana Khan-Pereira 1 Jake Simpkin 1 Reece Walsh 1 Goals: Josh James 5	Report	Tries: 1 Sione Fainu; 1 David Hollis Goals: 2 Jayden Sullivan

Suncorp Stadium, Brisbane
Referee: Daniel Schwass

Queensland under-18
2019 team		Coaching staff
1 Hamiso Tabuai-Fidow – FB; 2 Alofiana Khan-Pereira – WG; 3 Reece Hoffman – CE; 4 Tesi Niu – CE; 5 Xavier Coates – WG; 6 Josh James (c) – FE; 7 Sam Walker – HB; 8 Jack Martin – PR; 9 Jake Simpkin – HK; 10 Tristan Powell – PR; 11 Brendan Piakura – SR; 12 Trent Loiero – SR; 13 Juwan Compain – LK	14 Reece Walsh – FB; 15 Jack Howarth – SR; 16 Carsil Vaikai – LK; 17 Harrison Graham – LK	Head coach: Kurt Richards; Legend: (c) Captain(s); (vc) Vice-captain(s); Updated: 26 May 2019; Source(s): QRL.com.au

== See also ==
- Queensland state rugby league team
- Queensland Residents rugby league team
- Queensland under-20 rugby league team
- Queensland under-16 rugby league team
