= Queensland under-20 rugby league team =

Rugby team in Queensland, Australia

Queensland Under-20
Team information
- Nickname: Maroons
- Governing body: Queensland Rugby League
- Head coach: Ben Woolf
- Captain: Cory Paix
- Most caps: Luke Bateman (3)
- Top try-scorer: Bernard Lewis (3)
- Top point-scorer: Jake Clifford (18)
- Home stadium: Suncorp Stadium (52,500)

Uniforms
First colours

Team results
- First game
- New South Wales 18–14 Queensland (Penrith Stadium, Sydney; 21 April 2012)
- Biggest win
- Queensland 30–12 New South Wales (Suncorp Stadium, Brisbane; 11 July 2018)
- Biggest defeat
- New South Wales 36–10 Queensland (ANZ Stadium, Sydney; 10 July 2019)

The Queensland Under-20 rugby league team, also known as Queensland Under-20s or Queensland U20, represents Queensland in the sport of rugby league at an under-20 age level. Since 2012, the team has played an annual fixture against the New South Wales Under-20s team for the Darren Lockyer Shield. The team features players selected from the NRL, Intrust Super Cup, Canterbury Cup NSW, Hastings Deering Colts and Jersey Flegg Cup competitions. They are administered by the Queensland Rugby League.

== History ==
Prior to the advent of the National Youth Competition, junior interstate matches were contested at under-17 and under-19 levels. In 2008, the age levels switched to an under-16 and under-18 format but no under-20 game was held until 2012. In March 2012, the first under-20 Origin match was announced by the National Rugby League. The NRL had been looking into running the match for more than 18 months. In 2007, then-Gold Coast Titans managing director Michael Searle suggested an under-20 Origin series as a curtain raiser to the three senior State of Origin games. Former Queensland representative and Queensland Origin coach Kevin Walters was named as inaugural coach of the Queensland under-20 team.

From 2012 to 2014, the under-20 Origin fixture was held in April, on the Representative Weekend. In 2015, the game was moved to July as a curtain-raiser to State of Origin.

In April 2017, Queensland legend Justin Hodges was named as head coach of the side.

In 2018, they recorded their first win in the fixture, defeating New South Wales 30–12 at Suncorp Stadium. On 16 November 2018, assistant coach and former Queensland representative Scott Prince took over as co-head coach, alongside former Brisbane Broncos women's head coach Paul Dyer, after Hodges was elevated to assistant coach of the senior Queensland side.

== Players ==
Players selected for the Queensland under-20 team are under contract with a National Rugby League (NRL) side and play in either the NRL, Intrust Super Cup, Canterbury Cup NSW, Hastings Deering Colts or Jersey Flegg Cup competitions. Since 2013, the QRL has selected a pre-season under-20 squad featuring players in contention for the mid-season fixture. The squad participates in a weekend camp at the Queensland Academy of Sport.

=== 2020 squad ===
The 24-man training squad selected for the 2020 season:

Name	Position	Current club
Daejarn Asi	Centre	North Queensland Cowboys
Daniel Atkinson	Five-eighth	Melbourne Storm
Michael Bell	Centre	North Queensland Cowboys
Jack Bowyer	Fullback	Melbourne Storm
Tanah Boyd	Halfback	Gold Coast Titans
Geordie Brand	Prop	Sydney Roosters
Ethan Bullemor	Prop	Brisbane Broncos
Xavier Coates	Wing	Brisbane Broncos
Juwan Compain	Second-row	Gold Coast Titans
Ben Condon	Second-row	North Queensland Cowboys
Tom Dearden	Halfback	Brisbane Broncos
Tino Fa'asuamaleaui	Second-row	Melbourne Storm
Tom Gilbert	Lock	North Queensland Cowboys
Alofiana Khan-Pereira	Wing	Gold Coast Titans
Trent Loiero	Second-row	Melbourne Storm
Heilum Luki	Second-row	North Queensland Cowboys
Jack Martin	Prop	Brisbane Broncos
Tesi Niu	Fullback	Brisbane Broncos
Cory Paix	Halfback	Brisbane Broncos
Tristan Powell	Prop	Gold Coast Titans
Riley Price	Lock	North Queensland Cowboys
Ioane Seiuli	Second-row	Gold Coast Titans
Jake Simpkin	Hooker	Wests Tigers
Garrett Smith	Prop	North Queensland Cowboys
Jarrett Subloo	Five-eighth	Canberra Raiders
Hamiso Tabuai-Fidow	Fullback	North Queensland Cowboys
Adrian Trevilyan	Hooker	Canberra Raiders
Sebastian Winters-Chang	Wing	Canterbury-Bankstown Bulldogs

== Results ==
=== 2012 ===
21 April 2012

New South Wales U20	18 – 14	Queensland U20
Tries; Kane Evans 1 Chanel Mata'utia 1 Harry Siejka 1 Goals; Harry Siejka 3	Report	Tries; 2 Edrick Lee; 1 Aaron Whitchurch Goals; 1 Mitchell Frei

Centerbet Stadium, Sydney
Attendance: 5,105
Referee: Dave Munro
Player of the Match: Harry Siejka (NSW)

Queensland under-20
2012 team		Coaching staff
1 Lachlan Maranta – FB; 2 Hymel Hunt – WG; 3 Tautau Moga – CE; 4 Edrick Lee – CE; 5 Aaron Whitchurch – WG; 6 Kurt Mann – FE; 7 Ben Hampton (c) – HB; 8 Mitchell Frei – PR; 9 Alex Elisala – HK; 10 Dylan Napa – PR; 11 Chris Grevsmuhl – SR; 12 Caleb Timu – SR; 13 Benn Malley – LK	14 Brandon Tago – PR; 15 Corey Oates – SR; 16 Travis Peeters – SR; 17 Moses Mbye – FE	Head coach: Kevin Walters; Legend: (c) Captain(s); (vc) Vice-captain(s); Updated: 15 January 2016; Source(s): NRL.com

=== 2013 ===
Played as a curtain raiser to the Samoa-Tonga Pacific Rugby League test match.

20 April 2013

New South Wales U20	36 – 12	Queensland U20
Tries; Mitchell Cornish 2 George Jennings 2 Charly Runciman 2 Michael Lichaa 1 ' Goals; Dylan Walker 4	Report	Tries; 1 Anthony Milford; 1 Brandon Tago Goals; 2 Anthony Milford

Centerbet Stadium, Sydney
Attendance: 10,142
Referee: Grant Atkins, Peter Gough
Player of the Match: Mitchell Cornish (NSW)

Queensland under-20
2013 team		Coaching staff
1 Kurt Mann – FB; 2 Zac Santo – WG; 3 Hymel Hunt – CE; 4 Brenko Lee – CE; 5 Nene Macdonald – WG; 6 Moses Mbye – FE; 7 Anthony Milford (c) – HB; 8 Francis Molo – PR; 9 Kierran Moseley – HK; 10 Patrick Kaufusi – PR; 11 Caleb Timu – SR; 12 Corey Oates – SR; 13 Chris Grevsmuhl – LK	14 Luke Bateman – LK; 15 Lloyd Perrett – PR; 16 Rhyse Martin – SR; 17 Brandon Tago – PR	Head coach: Andrew Dunemann; Legend: (c) Captain(s); (vc) Vice-captain(s); Updated: 15 January 2016; Source(s): NRL.com

=== 2014 ===
Played as a curtain raiser to the Samoa-Fiji Pacific Rugby League test match.

3 May 2014

New South Wales	30 – 8	Queensland
Tries; Jake Mamo 3 Sione Mata'utia 1 Tyrone Phillips 1 Goals; Clinton Gutherson 5	Report	Tries; 1 Luke Bateman; 1 John Folau

Centerbet Stadium, Sydney
Attendance: 9,063
Referee: Chris Sutton
Player of the Match: Jake Mamo (NSW)

Queensland under-20
2014 team		Coaching staff
1 Valentine Holmes – FB; 2 Nene Macdonald – WG; 3 Brenko Lee – CE; 4 Brendan Elliot – CE; 5 John Folau – WG; 6 Anthony Milford (c) – FE; 7 Jaelen Feeney – HB; 8 Lloyd Perrett – PR; 9 Kierran Moseley – HK; 10 Christian Welch – PR; 11 Brett Greinke – SR; 12 Patrick Mago – SR; 13 Luke Bateman – LK	14 Cameron Munster – FE; 15 Francis Molo – PR; 16 Ajuma Adams – SR; 17 Joe Ofahengaue – PR	Head coach: Kevin Walters; Legend: (c) Captain(s); (vc) Vice-captain(s); Updated: 15 January 2016; Source(s): NRL.com

=== 2015 ===
Played as a curtain raiser to Game III of the 2015 State of Origin series.

8 July 2015

Queensland	16 – 32	New South Wales
Tries; Alex Barr 1 Luke Bateman 1 Gideon Gela-Mosby 1 Goals; Ashley Taylor 2	Report	Tries; 4 Brian Kelly; 1 Jackson Hastings; 1 Latrell Mitchell Goals; 3 Jackson Hastings; 1 Addison Demetriou

Suncorp Stadium, Brisbane
Referee: Matt Noyen
Player of the Match: Drew Hutchison (NSW)

Queensland under-20
2015 team		Coaching staff
1 Paul Byrnes – FB; 2 Gideon Gela-Mosby – WG; 3 Jordan Drew – CE; 4 Marion Seve – CE; 5 Conor Carey – WG; 6 Jayden Nikorima – FE; 7 Ashley Taylor – HB; 8 George Fai – PR; 9 Jayden Berrell – HK; 10 Lindsay Collins – PR; 11 Coen Hess – SR; 12 Alex Barr – SR; 13 Jai Arrow (c) – LK	14 Karl Lawton – HK; 15 Luke Bateman – LK; 16 Sam Lavea – PR; 17 Oshae Tuiasau – PR	Head coach: Kurt Wrigley; Legend: (c) Captain(s); (vc) Vice-captain(s); Updated: 15 January 2016; Source(s): QRL.com

=== 2016 ===
Played as a curtain raiser to Game III of the 2016 State of Origin series.

13 July 2016

Queensland	22 – 36	New South Wales
Tries; Bernard Lewis 3 Gideon Gela-Mosby 1 Bacho Salam 1 Goals; Brodie Croft 1	Report	Tries; 1 Jack Cogger; 1 Lachlan Croker; 1 Matthew Dufty; 1 Reuben Garrick; 1 Bayley Sironen; 1 Zac Woolford Goals; 6 Brian Kelly

ANZ Stadium, Sydney
Referee: Peter Gough
Player of the Match: Curtis Scott (NSW)

Queensland under-20
2016 team		Coaching staff
1 Gideon Gela-Mosby – FB; 2 Bernard Lewis – WG; 3 Bacho Salam – CE; 4 Gehamat Shibasaki – CE; 5 Marcus Jensen – WG; 6 Brodie Croft – FE; 7 Cooper Bambling – HB; 8 George Fai – PR; 9 Jake Turpin – HK; 10 Darryn Schonig – PR; 11 Jack Morris – SR; 12 Jaydn Su'A (c) – SR; 13 Lachlan Timm – LK	14 Lachlan Lewis – FE; 15 Josh Kerr – PR; 16 Charlie Galo – SR; 17 Darcy Maroske – PR	Head coach: Kurt Wrigley; Legend: (c) Captain(s); (vc) Vice-captain(s); Updated: 15 July 2016; Source(s): QRL.com.au

=== 2017 ===
Played as a curtain raiser to Game I of the 2017 State of Origin series.

31 May 2017

Queensland	16 – 30	New South Wales
Tries; Brodie Croft 1 Corey Horsburgh 1 Tristan Sailor 1 Goals; Tristan Sailor 2	Report	Tries; 1 Nat Butcher; 1 Jai Field; 1 Reuben Garrick; 1 Blake Lawrie; 1 Jack Murchie Goals; 5 Jai Field

Suncorp Stadium, Brisbane
Referee: Jarrod Cole, Adam Cassidy
Player of the Match: Jack Murchie (NSW)

Queensland under-20
2017 team		Coaching staff
1 Corey Allan – FB; 2 Phillip Sami – WG; 3 Gehamat Shibasaki – CE; 4 Daniel Brownbill – CE; 5 Tristan Sailor – WG; 6 AJ Brimson – FE; 7 Brodie Croft (c) – HB; 16 Corey Horsburgh – PR; 9 Harry Grant – HK; 10 Keenan Palasia – PR; 11 Hiale Roycroft – SR; 12 Mitchell Dunn – SR; 13 Keegan Hipgrave – LK	8 Patrick Carrigan – LK; 14 Gerome Burns – HB; 15 Apiata Noema – SR; 17 Tom Skinner – PR	Head coach: Justin Hodges; Legend: (c) Captain(s); (vc) Vice-captain(s); Updated: 23 May 2017; Source(s): QRL.com.au

=== 2018 ===
Played as a curtain raiser to Game III of the 2018 State of Origin series.

11 July 2018

Queensland	30 – 12	New South Wales
Tries; Jake Clifford 2 Corey Horsburgh 1 Tristan Sailor 1 Kurt Wiltshire 1 Goals; Jake Clifford 5	Report	Tries; 1 Billy Smith; 1 Brian To'o Goals; 2 Kyle Flanagan

Suncorp Stadium, Brisbane
Referee: Ben Watts
Player of the Match: Jake Clifford (Queensland)

Queensland under-20
2018 team		Coaching staff
1 Corey Allan – FB; 2 Murray Taulagi – WG; 3 Gehamat Shibasaki – CE; 4 Kurt Wiltshire – CE; 5 Tristan Sailor – WG; 6 AJ Brimson – FE; 7 Jake Clifford – HB; 8 Thomas Flegler – PR; 9 Harry Grant – HK; 10 Patrick Carrigan (c) – PR; 11 Louis Geraghty – SR; 12 Beau Fermor – SR; 13 Corey Horsburgh – LK	14 Lachlan Lam – FE; 15 Tino Fa'asuamaleaui – SR; 16 Sam Johnstone – PR; 17 Reed Mahoney – HK	Head coach: Justin Hodges; Legend: (c) Captain(s); (vc) Vice-captain(s); Updated: 11 July 2018; Source(s): QRL.com.au

=== 2019 ===
Played as a curtain raiser to Game III of the 2019 State of Origin series.

10 July 2019

New South Wales	36 – 10	Queensland
Tries; Matt Burton 2 Mathew Croker 1 Ethan Parry 1 Ky Rodwell 1 Teig Wilton 1 Goals; Stephen Crichton 6	Report	Tries; 1 Ronaldo Mulitalo; 1 Murray Taulagi Goals; 1 Braydon Trindall

ANZ Stadium, Sydney
Referee: Martin Jones
Player of the Match: Matt Burton (New South Wales)

Queensland under-20
2019 team		Coaching staff
1 Ronaldo Mulitalo – FB; 2 Treymain Spry – WG; 3 Tesi Niu – CE; 4 Murray Taulagi – CE; 5 Elijah Anderson – WG; 6 Braydon Trindall – FE; 7 Cory Paix (c) – HB; 8 Eddie Blacker – PR; 9 Kobe Hetherington – HK; 10 Ethan Bullemor – PR; 11 Tino Fa'asuamaleaui – SR; 12 J'maine Hopgood – SR; 13 Tom Gilbert – LK	14 Tanah Boyd – HB; 15 Ben Condon – LK; 16 Logan Bayliss-Brow – PR; 17 Nathan Barrett – SR	Head coach: Scott Prince & Paul Dyer; Legend: (c) Captain(s); (vc) Vice-captain(s); Updated: 10 July 2019; Source(s): QRL.com.au

== See also ==
- Queensland state rugby league team
- Queensland Residents rugby league team
- Queensland under-18 rugby league team
- Queensland under-16 rugby league team
- Junior Kangaroos
- Australian Schoolboys rugby league team
