= Queensland under-16 rugby league team =

Youth rugby league team representing Queensland, Australia

Queensland Under-16
Team information
- Nickname: Maroons
- Governing body: Queensland Rugby League
- Head coach: Mick Roberts
- Home stadium: Suncorp Stadium (52,500)

Uniforms
First colours

Team results
- First game
- New South Wales 30–16 Queensland (ANZ Stadium, Sydney; 21 May 2008)
- Biggest win
- Queensland 30–10 New South Wales (Etihad Stadium, Melbourne; 3 June 2009)
- Biggest defeat
- New South Wales 30–0 Queensland (ANZ Stadium, Sydney; 5 June 2013)

The Queensland Under-16 rugby league team, also known as Queensland Under-16s or Queensland U16, represents Queensland in the sport of rugby league at an under-16 age level. Since 2008, the team has played an annual fixture against the New South Wales Under-16s team as a curtain raiser to a State of Origin game. The team features players selected from Queensland's premier under-16 rugby league competition, the Cyril Connell Cup. They are administered by the Queensland Rugby League.

== History ==
Prior to 2008, junior interstate matches were contested at under-17 and under-19 levels. In 2008, with the advent of the National Youth Competition, the age levels switched to an under-16 and under-18 format to keep in line with the NSWRL's existing SG Ball Cup and Harold Matthews Cup competitions and the QRL's Mal Meninga Cup and Cyril Connell Cup competitions, which would begin in 2009.

Queensland suffered defeat in the first under-16 Origin fixture in 2008, with a side that featured future NRL players Kyle Feldt, Ben Hampton, Lachlan Maranta and Korbin Sims. They recorded their first win a year later, defeating New South Wales 30–10 in 2009. That team featured future New Zealand international Jason Taumalolo. From 2010 to 2013, Queensland suffered four straight defeats before winning both fixtures against New South Wales in 2014 and 2015.

== Players ==
Players selected for the Queensland under-16 team are usually contracted with a National Rugby League (NRL) side and, until 2017, played in the Cyril Connell Cup. Occasionally players who are contracted to Sydney-based NRL sides, who play in the Harold Matthews Cup, are selected. In 2008, before the Cyril Connell Cup began, players were selected from the under-16 representative carnival in Proserpine. Each pre-season the Queensland Rugby League will select an under-16 squad featuring players in contention for the mid-season fixture. The squad participates in a weekend camp at the Queensland Academy of Sport.

In 2017, the QRL ended the Cyril Connell Cup, replacing it with a three-day statewide carnival in which the Queensland under-16 side would be selected from.

In 2019, no under-16 State of Origin was held, with both states instead holding a City vs Country fixture. On 29 September 2019, Queensland Country under-16 defeated City 44–4, and a Queensland under-16 merit side was named after the game.

== Results ==
=== 2008 ===
Played as a curtain raiser to Game I of the 2008 State of Origin series.

21 May 2008

New South Wales U16	30 – 16	Queensland U16
Tries; Jacob Miller 2 William Hopoate 1 Vaipuna Tia Kilifi 1 Jason Wehbe 1 Goals; Jason Wehbe 3 Harry Siejka 2	Report	Tries; Josh Batilabasi 1 Benn Malley 1 Korbin Sims 1 Goals; Mitchell Frei 2

ANZ Stadium, Sydney

Queensland under-16
2008 team		Coaching staff
1 Lachlan Maranta – FB; 2 Josh Batilabasi – WG; 3 Aaron Whitchurch – CE; 4 Kyle Feldt – CE; 5 Savern Rapana – WG; 6 Jordan Meads – FE; 7 Ben Hampton – HB; 8 Tauryn Laurenson – PR; 9 Jay Lobwein – HK; 10 Jai Ingram – PR; 11 Mitchell Frei – SR; 12 Korbin Sims – SR; 13 Benn Malley – LK	14 Kyle Burkhardt – SR; 15 Kurtis Ritchie – SR; 16 Tennyson Elliott – PR; 17 Leon Curry – SR	Head coach: Jon Buchanan; Legend: (c) Captain(s); (vc) Vice-captain(s); Updated: 16 January 2016; Source(s): NYCDB

=== 2009 ===
Played as a curtain raiser to Game I of the 2009 State of Origin series.

3 June 2009

New South Wales U16	10 – 30	Queensland U16
Tries; Jordan Malaki 1 Ryan Wilson 1 Goals; Sam Short 1	Report	Tries; Mitch Ardler 2 Luke Abdul-Rahman 1 Rian Diffey 1 Andrew Shipway 1 Jordan Tighe 1 Goals; Sam Foster 3

Etihad Stadium, Melbourne
Referee: Nick Morel

Queensland under-16
2009 team		Coaching staff
1 Jordan Tighe – FB; 2 Rian Diffey – WG; 3 BJ Burgess – CE; 4 Jerome Leedy – CE; 5 Mitch Ardler – WG; 6 Luke Abdul-Rahman (c) – FE; 7 Sam Foster – HB; 8 Stephen Coombe – PR; 9 Cameron Cullen – HK; 10 Caleb Binge – PR; 11 Jake Kelly – SR; 12 Jason Taumalolo – SR; 13 Andrew Shipway – LK	14 Chris Grevsmuhl – LK; 15 Shaquille Blair – PR; 16 Jesse Dimaggio – SR; 17 Francis Veukiso – PR	Head coach: Jon Buchanan; Legend: (c) Captain(s); (vc) Vice-captain(s); Updated: 16 January 2016; Source(s): NYCDB

=== 2010 ===
Played as a curtain raiser to Game III of the 2010 State of Origin series.

7 July 2010

New South Wales U16	24 – 14	Queensland U16
Tries; Robbie Kamoto 1 Tyrone Phillips 1 Kelepi Tanginoa 1 Joshua Walker 1 Goals; Clinton Gutherson 4	Report	Tries; Anthony Milford 2 Jordan Dulay 1 Goals; Scott Doyle 1

ANZ Stadium, Sydney
Referee: Jon Stone

Queensland under-16
2010 team		Coaching staff
1 Anthony Milford – FB; 2 Nene Macdonald – WG; 3 Rhett Webster – CE; 4 Jordan Dulay – CE; 5 Brendan Elliot – WG; 6 Mitchell Grimes – FE; 7 Kodi Nikorima – HB; 8 Francis Molo – PR; 9 Dan Clarke – HK; 10 Corey Jensen – PR; 11 Scott Doyle – SR; 12 Jack Rycen – SR; 13 Che Marion-Fa'alafi – LK	14 Corey Oates – SR; 15 Sam Harrold – SR; 16 Brandon Lee – HK; 17 Rhys Tierney – PR	Head coach: Brendan Lam; Legend: (c) Captain(s); (vc) Vice-captain(s); Updated: 16 January 2016; Source(s): NYCDB

=== 2011 ===
Played as a curtain raiser to Game I of the 2011 State of Origin series.

25 May 2011

Queensland U16	16 – 18	New South Wales U16
Tries; Jack Anderson 1 Luke Bateman 1 Ryan Mitchell 1 Goals; Duncan Paia'aua 2	Report	Tries; Bradley Deitz 1 John Fomai 1 Dylan Russell 1 Goals; Brendan Cox 1 Dee Jay Harris 1

Suncorp Stadium, Brisbane

Queensland under-16
2011 team		Coaching staff
1 Paul Byrnes – FB; 2 Ryan Mitchell – WG; 3 Shaun Hudson – CE; 4 Brenko Lee – CE; 5 Eric Blair – WG; 6 Nathan Wilson – FE; 7 Duncan Paia'aua (c) – HB; 8 James Iodice – PR; 9 Jayden Berrell – HK; 10 Sam Gee – PR; 11 Luke Bateman – SR; 12 Harry Pondekas – SR; 13 Jai Arrow – LK	14 Tyson Cleal – SR; 15 Jarrod Earle – PR; 16 Jack Anderson – SR; 17 Temone Power – PR	Head coach: Scott Dunshea; Legend: (c) Captain(s); (vc) Vice-captain(s); Updated: 16 January 2016; Source(s): NYCDB

=== 2012 ===
Played as a curtain raiser to Game I of the 2012 State of Origin series.

23 May 2012

New South Wales U16	30 – 16	Queensland U16
Tries; Travis Edwards 1 Robert Jennings 1 Dillon Khoury 1 Tevita Pangai 1 David Sheridan 1 Alex Twal 1 Goals; Jackson Hastings 3	Report	Tries; Cooper Bambling 1 Simione Fatafehi 1 Sam Smith 1 Goals; Sheldon Bobbert 2

Etihad Stadium, Melbourne
Referee: Mick Laverty

Queensland under-16
2012 team		Coaching staff
1 Jesse Pomare-Anderson – FB; 2 Sheldon Bobbert – WG; 3 Sam Smiths – CE; 4 – CE; 5 Luke Chevi Ellis – WG; 6 Braydon McMahon – FE; 7 Coopers Bambling – HB; 8 George Fai – PR; 9 Jenan Wedderburn-Parrish – HK; 10 Sam Lavea – PR; 11 Regan Grieve – SR; 12 Tarahawaiki Kaumoana – SR; 13 Kieran Duffin – LK	14 Brandon Smith – HK; 15 Sam Swift – LK; 16 Coen Hess – SR; 17 Daymeric Pelo – PR	Head coach: Anthony Seibold; Legend: (c) Captain(s); (vc) Vice-captain(s); Updated: 16 January 2016; Source(s): NYCDB

=== 2013 ===
Played as a curtain raiser to Game I of the 2013 State of Origin series.

5 June 2013

New South Wales U16	30 – 0	Queensland U16
Tries; Jesse Ramien 2 Jack Cogger 1 Gabe Hamlin 1 Latrell Mitchell 1 Reimis Smith 1 Goals; Brock Lamb 3	Report

ANZ Stadium, Sydney
Referee: Ziggy Przeklasa-Adamski

Queensland under-16
2013 team		Coaching staff
1 Connor Cox – FB; 2 Nathan Lafferty – WG; 3 Jaydn Su'A – CE; 4 Izaia Perese – CE; 5 Dylan Parise – WG; 6 Jayden Carroll – FE; 7 Logan Spaander – HB; 8 Keegan Hipgrave – PR; 9 Jack Miers – HK; 10 Lachlan Barr – PR; 11 Keanu Dawson – SR; 12 Lachlan Lanskey – SR; 13 Michael Molo – LK	14 Agassi Stowers – PR; 15 Calvin Pritchard – SR; 16 Nathan Prostamo – SR; 17 Mitchell Dunn – FE	Head coach: Mark Tookey; Legend: (c) Captain(s); (vc) Vice-captain(s); Updated: 16 January 2016; Source(s): QRL.com.au

=== 2014 ===
Played as a curtain raiser to Game I of the 2014 State of Origin series.

28 May 2014

Queensland U16	20 – 18	New South Wales U16
Tries; Daniel Walker 1 Sato Ketia Opo 1 Syd Smith 1 Enari Tuala 1 Goals; Steven Tatipata 2	Report	Tries; Sione Hopoate 1 Cameron Murray 1 Katoni Staggs 1 Goals; Brendan O'Hagan 3

Suncorp Stadium, Queensland

Queensland under-16
2014 team		Coaching staff
1 Gehamat Shibasaki – FB; 2 Michael Carroll – WG; 3 Steven Tatipata – CE; 4 Jason Chapman – CE; 5 Enari Tuala – WG; 6 Sato Ketia Opo – FE; 7 Lachlan Lam – HB; 8 William O'Gradey – PR; 9 Brent Woolf – HK; 10 Ethan Paikea – PR; 11 Syd Smith – SR; 12 Kobe Tararo – SR; 13 Reuben Cotter (c) – LK	14 Vita Sula-Siaosi – HK; 15 Jack Peacock – PR; 16 Mitipere Tuatai – PR; 17 Zane Willshire – FE	Head coach: Kurt Richards; Legend: (c) Captain(s); (vc) Vice-captain(s); Updated: 16 January 2016; Source(s): QRL.com.au

=== 2015 ===
Played as a curtain raiser to Game I of the 2015 State of Origin series.

27 May 2015

New South Wales U16	6 – 10	Queensland U16
Tries; Campbell Graham 1 Goals; Luke Metcalf 1	Report	Tries; Nathan Barrett 1 Travis Turnbull 1 Goals; Travis Turnbull 1

ANZ Stadium, Sydney
Referee: Daniel Olford

Queensland under-16
2015 team		Coaching staff
1 Travis Turnbull – FB; 2 Tom Kenny – WG; 3 Reihana Marsh – CE; 4 Clayton Mack – CE; 5 Thane Kellermeyer – WG; 6 Max Dowd – FE; 7 Dray Ngatuere-Wroe – HB; 8 Thomas Flegler – PR; 9 Tyson Smoothy – HK; 10 Tazmon McRobbie – PR; 11 Darius Farmer – SR; 12 Brandon Russell – SR; 13 Jayden Bishop – LK	14 Braydon Trindall – HB; 15 Lochlyn Sheldon – PR; 16 Ben Thomas – SR; 17 Nathan Barrett – SR	Head coach: Kurt Richards; Legend: (c) Captain(s); (vc) Vice-captain(s); Updated: 16 January 2016; Source(s): QRL.com.au

=== 2016 ===
Played as a curtain raiser to Game I of the 2016 State of Origin series.

1 June 2016

New South Wales U16	12 - 10	Queensland U16
Tries; William Kei 1 Bronson Xerri 1 Goals; Jock Madden 2	Report	Tries; Dejzha Pene 1 Jonathan Siofele 1 Goals; Cory Paix 2

ANZ Stadium, Sydney
Referee: Todd Smith

Queensland under-16
2016 team		Coaching staff
1 McKenzie Baker – FB; 2 Dejzha Pene – WG; 3 Jack Paterson – CE; 4 Ioane Seiuli – CE; 5 Jonathan Siofele – WG; 6 Cory Paix (c) – FE; 7 Tanah Boyd – HB; 8 Garrett Smith – PR; 9 Zac McCormack – HK; 10 Geordie Brand – PR; 11 Ethan Bullemor – SR; 12 Thomas Gilbert – SR; 13 David Fifita (c) – LK	14 Lazeryth Su'A – HK; 15 Hamilton Taia – PR; 16 Tino Fa'asuamaleaui – SR; 17 Blake Campbell – SR	Head coach: Kurt Richards; Legend: (c) Captain(s); (vc) Vice-captain(s); Updated: 27 June 2016; Source(s): QRL.com.au

=== 2017 ===
Played as a curtain raiser to Game III of the 2017 State of Origin series.

12 July 2017

Queensland U16	16 - 22	New South Wales U16
Tries; Alofiana Khan-Pereira 2 Will Evans 1 Goals; Ezra Coulston 2	Report	Tries; Bradman Best 1 Blake Dowel 1 Cooper Jenkins 1 Aaron Schoupp 1 Goals; Aaron Schoupp 3

Suncorp Stadium, Brisbane
Referee: Dan Munroe

Queensland under-16
2017 team		Coaching staff
1 Tesi Niu – FB; 2 Alofiana Khan-Pereira – WG; 3 Will Evans (c) – CE; 4 Ezra Coulston – CE; 5 Ryan Garner – WG; 6 Joshua James – FE; 7 Thomas Dearden – HB; 8 Lance Bagon – PR; 9 Jake Simpkin – HK; 10 Stepharn Holo – PR; 11 Eli Morgan – SR; 12 Tristan Powell – SR; 13 Nelson Grove – LK	14 Zach Brooks – LK; 15 Tahu Kingi – PR; 16 Myphala Ah Chong – PR; 17 Feao Maka – CE	Head coach: Kurt Richards; Legend: (c) Captain(s); (vc) Vice-captain(s); Updated: 25 September 2017; Source(s): QRL.com.au

=== 2018 ===
Played as a curtain raiser to the Round 18 Brisbane Broncos-Warriors game.

15 July 2018

Queensland U16	14 - 28	New South Wales U16
Tries; Tyrone Sa'u 1 Keegan Vandenberg 1 Reece Walsh 1 Goals; Reece Walsh 1		Tries; Thomas Cant 1 Noah Griffiths 1 Viliami Penisini 1 Zion Tauasa 1 Kaeo Weekes 1 Goals; Donovan Boney 4

Suncorp Stadium, Brisbane
Referee: Jordan Morel

Queensland under-16
2018 team		Coaching staff
1 Reece Walsh – FB; 2 Tyrone Sa'u – WG; 3 Keegan Vandenberg – CE; 4 Tate Roberts – CE; 5 Xavier Savage – WG; 6 Matamatagi Ripley – FE; 7 Henri Stocks – HB; 8 Wian Joubert – PR; 9 Lachlan Adamson – HK; 10 Caleb Evans – PR; 11 Israel Higgins – SR; 12 Brocco Uhrle – SR; 13 Brendan Piakura – LK	14 Ediq Ambrosyev – HK; 15 Isaiah Vailalo – PR; 16 Samuel Shannon – LK; 17 Byron Parnell – CE	Head coach: Mick Roberts; Legend: (c) Captain(s); (vc) Vice-captain(s); Updated: 14 July 2018; Source(s): QRL.com.au

=== 2019 ===
Merit side selected after the 2019 Under-16 Queensland City vs Country fixture.

Queensland under-16
2019 merit team	Coaching staff
1 Tuvalli Khan-Pereira – FB; 2 Arthur Miller-Stephen – WG; 3 Ragarive Wavik – CE; 4 Orlando Swain – CE; 5 Kaleb Ngamanu – WG; 6 Keanu Wright-Dunrobin – FE; 7 Harradyn Wilson – HB; 8 Paul Bryan – PR; 9 Shaun Packer – HK; 10 John Radel – PR; 11 Brock Priestley – SR; 12 Jeremiah Nanai – SR; 13 Luke Jack – LK	Legend: (c) Captain(s); (vc) Vice-captain(s); Updated: 4 October 2019; Source(s): QRL.com.au

== See also ==
- Queensland state rugby league team
- Queensland Residents rugby league team
- Queensland under-20 rugby league team
- Queensland under-18 rugby league team
