= Keenan Palasia =

Samoa international rugby league footballer

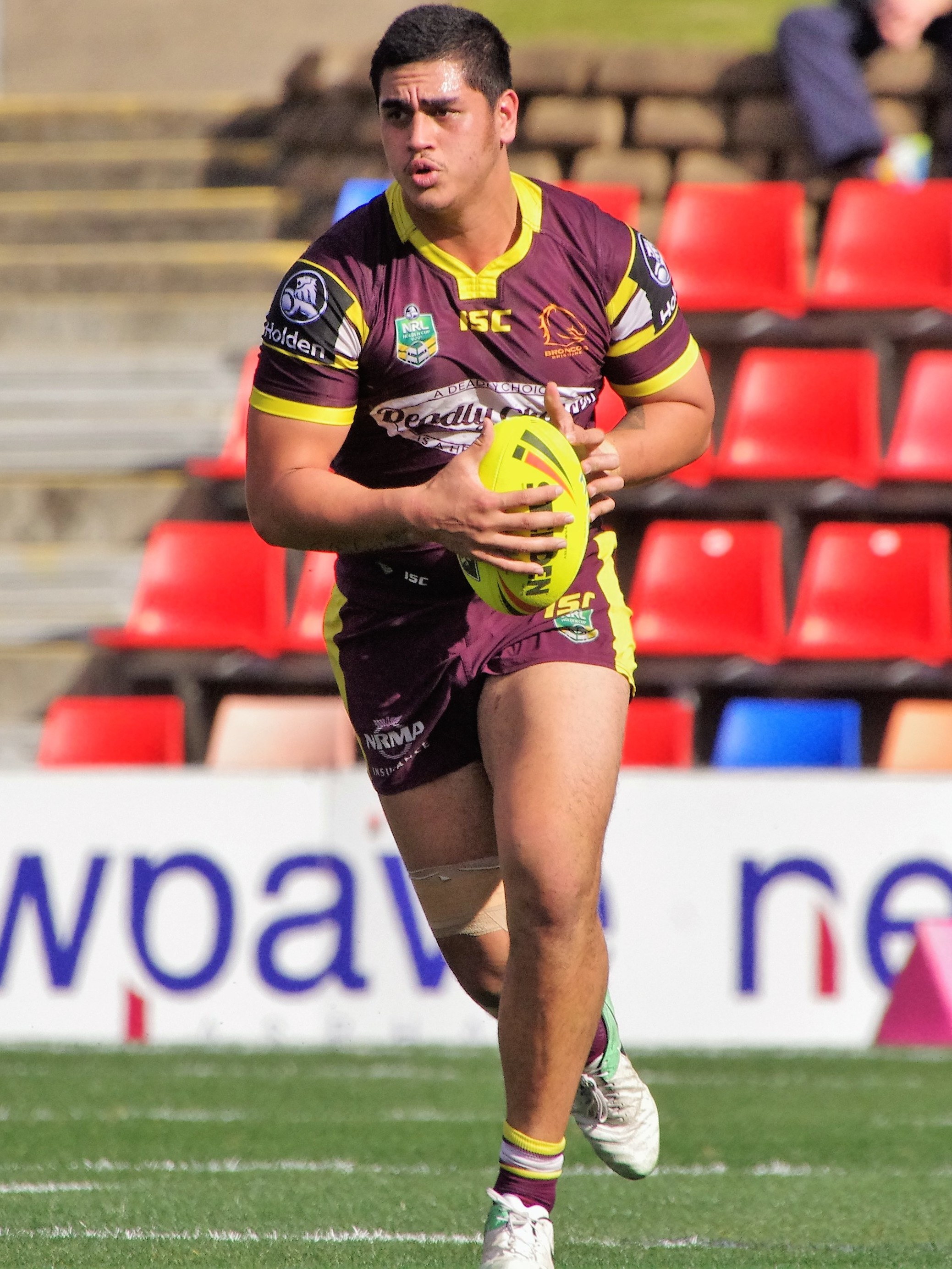

Personal information
- Full name: Keenan Palasia
- Born: 24 January 1997 (age 29) Brisbane, Queensland, Australia
- Height: 6 ft 4 in (1.92 m)
- Weight: 17 st 0 lb (108 kg)

Playing information
- Position: Prop, Loose forward, Second-row
Club
Years	Team	Pld	T	G	FG	P
2019–23	Brisbane Broncos	53	1	0	0	4
2024	Gold Coast Titans	15	3	0	0	12
2025–	Leeds Rhinos	46	2	0	0	8
	Total	114	6	0	0	24
Representative
Years	Team	Pld	T	G	FG	P
2019	Queensland Residents	1	0	0	0	0
2022–23	Samoa	3	0	0	0	0
2023	NZ Māoris	1	0	0	0	0
- Source: As of 1 January 2025

Keenan Palasia (born 24 January 1997) is a Samoa international rugby league and Māori All Stars footballer who plays as a loose forward and prop for the Leeds Rhinos in the Super League.

== Background ==
Palasia was born in the Logan area of Brisbane, Queensland, Australia and raised on the Gold Coast, Queensland, Australia.

Palasia is of Maori & Samoan descent making him eligible to play for QLD, Australia, New Zealand and Samoa. His mother Carly is Māori born in Waitara, Taranaki New Zealand from the Wallace (Warihi) family with ties to iwis Te Ati Awa, Ngati Mutunga and Ngati Maniapoto maternally as well as Te Rarawa paternally through the Matthew’s family originally from Panguru. Palasia’s father is Christchurch born Samoan whose parents originate from villages Malie and Falefa in Samoa.

Palasia is also the eldest nephew of former NRL player and Cronulla Sharks 2016 premiership winning centre, Ricky Leutele (the youngest brother of Keenan's father) who finished his career in the English Superleague for Leigh Leopards. Palasia has a younger brother, Saiah who was born in 2001 on the Gold Coast.

Keenan was born in Logan, Brisbane but he & his family moved to the Gold Coast in 1997 when he was just 2 weeks old & he was raised on the Gold Coast for over 17 years until he graduated from Palm Beach-Currumbin High School in 2014 then moved to Brisbane to commence his 1st preseason with Brisbane Broncos.

He played his 1st rugby league game at age 10 for Parkwood Sharks Junior Rugby League club on the Gold Coast where he was later joined by close friend, primary school class mate & touch football team mate Briton Nikora. Palasia then later played his teenage years for Nerang Roosters Junior Rugby League.

Keenan played schoolboy Rugby League for Palm Beach-Currumbin High School (PBC) from 2010-2014 and was also a part of the 2014 PBC Reds team playing 2nd Row in the GIO Cup Open Schoolboys Qld final winning against Wavell High School alongside Keegan Hipgrave & Jed Cartwright.

== Early career ==
In 2012, Palasia who was in the Gold Coast Titans development system since age 13, played in the under-16s Gold Coast Titans Cyril Connell Cup side as a 15-year-old. In 2012, he represented the Queensland under-15 Schoolboys rugby league team alongside Jaydn Su'A & Keegan Hipgrave in Darwin. Also in 2012, he represented the Qld Samoa under-16 rugby league team as a 15 year old in the annual Qld Pacific Island Cultural Rugby League game winning against Qld Maori alongside George Fai & JJ Collins. In 2013, he captained the under-16 Gold Coast Green rugby league team in the Cyril Connell Cup competition. That same year, he was a part of the Queensland Academy of Sport (QAS) Rugby League team which toured New Zealand and won both games against New Zealand residents playing second row.

Also in 2013, Palasia represented Qld Samoa under-16 Rugby League team in the annual Qld Pacific Island Cultural Rugby League Carnival winning the competition alongside Jaydn Su'A and Phillip Sami. In November 2013, Palasia formally signed with the Brisbane Broncos as a 16 year old. In 2014, he played for Gold Coast White under-18 team as a 17 year old in the Mal Meninga Cup competition. Also in 2014, Palasia represented the Queensland under-18 Open Schoolboys rugby league team as a 17 year old. In 2015, Palasia represented the Queensland 18yrs State of Origin rugby league team, under coach Anthony Seibold, in Melbourne at the State of Origin opener at the MCG winning against NSW alongside Keegan Hipgrave, Jaydn Su'a & Gehamat Shibasaki. In 2017, Keenan represented the Queensland under-20 rugby league team under coach Justin Hodges at Suncorp Stadium alongside Brodie Croft, Phillip Sami & AJ Brimson whilst also working in the NRL office under ex-Kangaroos and QLD Origin player David Shillington for the NRL State of Mind initiative co-ordinating awareness presentations to local junior rugby league clubs. In 2019, Palasia represented the Queensland Residents rugby league team in second row winning against NSW at Dolphin Stadium, Redcliffe alongside fellow ISC Wynnum Manly Seagulls team mates Mitch Cronin, Delouise Hoeter, Richie Kennar & Sam Scarlett.

== Playing career ==
On 7 July 2019, Palasia made his NRL debut for the Broncos against the Cronulla-Sutherland Sharks & childhood friend Briton Nikora. After a journey to the 2019 Intrust Super Cup grand final, Palasia sustained an ACL tear during 2019/2020 preseason and underwent his 3rd knee reconstruction, sidelining him for the entire 2020 season. This was his 5th surgery since age 17 (hand, ankle and 3 knee surgeries). In Round 11 2021, Palasia scored his first NRL try in his first game in two seasons in a 34-16 win over the Sydney Roosters. Historically a second rower with the added footwork of a back and ability to ball play throughout his career due to also playing touch football at representative levels as a youngster, Palasia has shown versatility by recently being moved into the middle in the prop & lock positions which has been a successful transition. On 1 December 2022, Palasia signed a two-year deal to join the Gold Coast starting in 2024.

=== 2023 ===
Palasia played a total of 20 games for Brisbane in the 2023 NRL season. He played off the bench in Brisbane's 26-24 loss against Penrith in the 2023 NRL Grand Final. Palasia also debuted for the Aotearoa Maori Allstars team in February 2024 alongside his close friend and captain Briton Nikora & former Brisbane Broncos team mate Jesse Arthurs as well as fellow Toa Samoa team mate Royce Hunt

=== 2024 ===
Palasia played 15 games for the Gold Coast and scored three tries for the club in the 2024 NRL season as the club finished 14th on the table.

On 7 October 2024 it was reported that he requested a release from the club to sign with Leeds in the Super League on a two-year deal from 2025. On 26 November, the Gold Coast officially confirmed the release of Palasia.

=== 2025 ===
Palasia played 28 games for Leeds in the 2025 Super League season including the clubs heart breaking loss against St Helens in the elimination playoff match.

== Statistics ==
Year	Team	Games	Tries	Pts
2019	Brisbane Broncos	2		
2021	Brisbane Broncos	9	1	4
2022	Brisbane Broncos	22		
2023	Brisbane Broncos	20		
2024	Gold Coast Titans	15	3	12
2025	Leeds Rhinos	28	1	4
2026	Leeds Rhinos	13	1	4
	Totals	109	6	24
