= Mitchell Dunn =

Australian rugby league footballer

Mitch Dunn
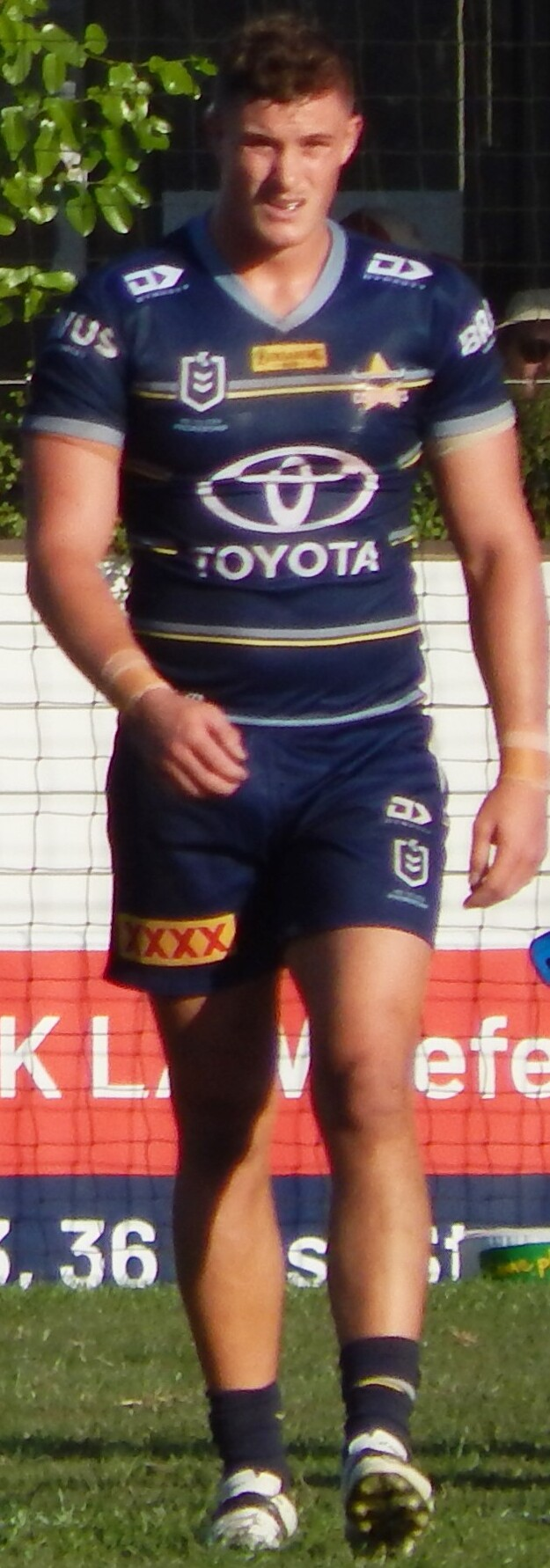

Personal information
- Full name: Mitchell Dunn
- Born: 3 February 1997 (age 29) Gold Coast, Queensland, Australia
- Height: 190 cm (6 ft 3 in)
- Weight: 105 kg (16 st 7 lb)

Playing information
- Position: Second-row, Lock, Five-eighth
Club
Years	Team	Pld	T	G	FG	P
2018–23	North Qld Cowboys	58	3	0	0	12
- Source: As of 20 May 2023

Mitchell Dunn (born 3 February 1997) is an Australian former professional rugby league footballer who currently works as a coach for the North Queensland Cowboys.

Dunn dominated for six seasons in the National Rugby League (NRL) for the North Queensland club, predominately at second-row.

== Background ==
Dunn was born on the Gold Coast, Queensland, Australia and grew up in Mackay, Queensland.

He played his junior rugby league for Mackay Brothers and attended St Patrick's College, before being signed by the North Queensland Cowboys.

== Playing career ==
=== Early years ===
In 2013, Dunn played for the Mackay Cutters' Cyril Connell Cup side and represented Queensland under-16s. In 2014, he moved up to the Cutters' Mal Meninga Cup side before moving to Townsville to join the North Queensland Cowboys under-20s squad in 2015. That season, he played in the Townsville Stingers' Mal Meninga Cup winning side and was selected for Queensland under-18s, before making his debut for the Cowboys' under-20s team. He played mostly as a five-eighth.

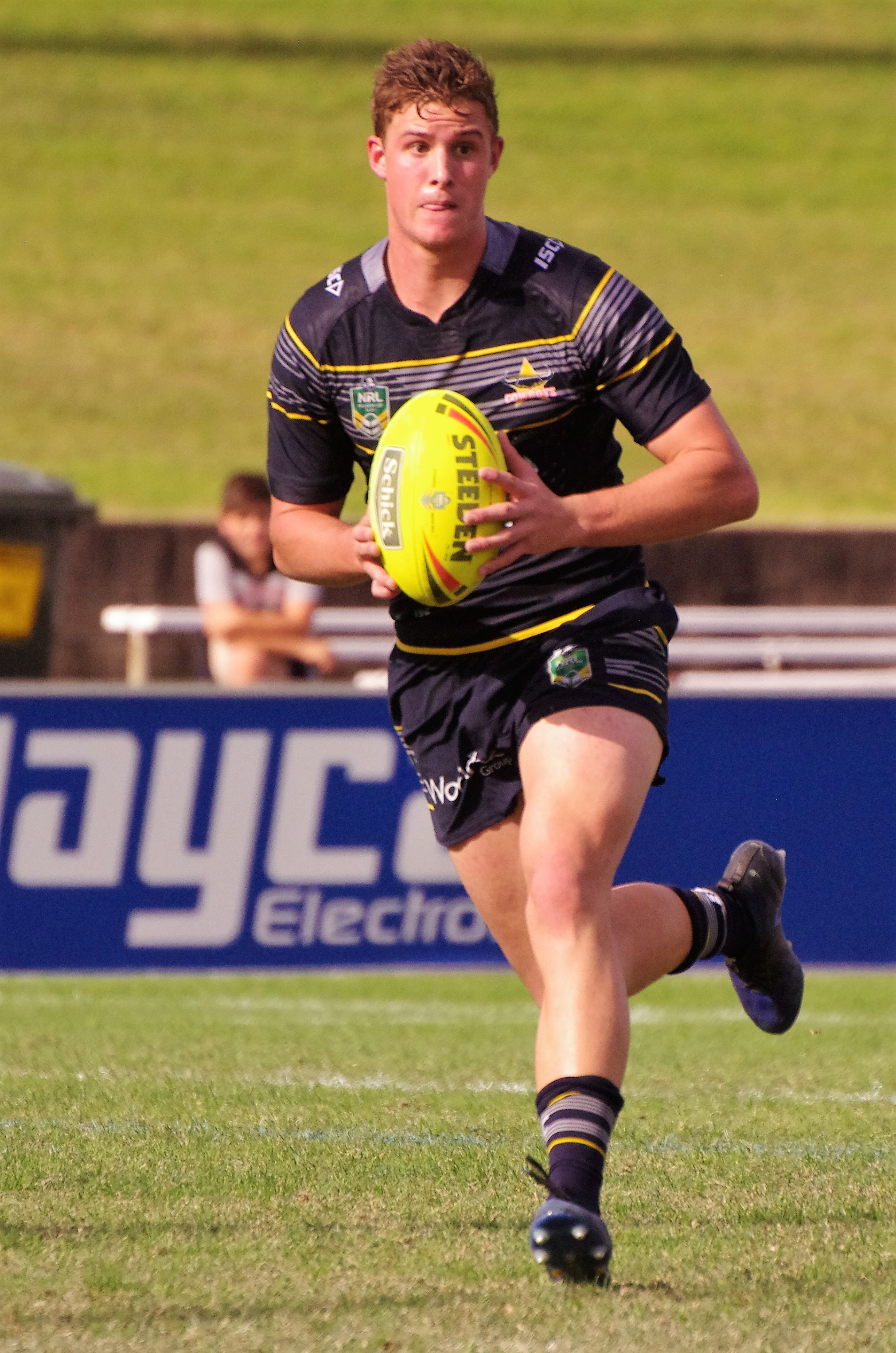
Dunn playing for the Cowboys' NYC team in 2017

In 2017, Dunn captained the North Queensland Cowboys NYC team and represented the Queensland under-20s side. In October 2017, he re-signed with North Queensland on a two-year contract until the end of 2019, joining their NRL squad.

2017 was a successful season as Dunn formed a lethal combination with impressive backrower Ryan Lloyd.

=== 2018 ===
In 2018, Dunn graduated to the North Queensland Cowboys Queensland Cup feeder side, the Mackay Cutters. In Round 13 of the 2018 NRL season, he made his NRL debut, coming off the bench against the Manly-Warringah Sea Eagles.

=== 2019 ===
Dunn played the first four games of the season for the North Queensland side, before being dropped back to the Mackay Cutters. He returned to first grade in Round 9, playing five games, earning his first start at second row in a 22–16 win over the Canberra Raiders. In Round 13, Dunn dislocated his shoulder in North Queensland's 20–22 loss to the Manly-Warringah Sea Eagles, ruling him out for the season.

On 4 September, he signed a one-year contract extension with North Queensland.

=== 2020 ===
In February, Dunn was a member of the North Queensland 2020 NRL Nines winning squad. After starting the season coming off the bench, Dunn established himself as a starting second-rower for the Cowboys. On 31 July, he re-signed with the North Queensland outfit until the end of the 2022 season.

In round 14, he scored his first try in a 30–31 loss to the South Sydney Rabbitohs. He played 17 games in 2020, starting 12 at second-row, and was sin-binned twice, against the Gold Coast Titans in Round 3 and against the Newcastle Knights in Round 15. On 3 October, Dunn won the Cowboys' Coach's Award.

=== 2021–2023 ===
Dunn played 20 games for North Queensland in the 2021 NRL season as the club finished 15th on the table. In the 2022 NRL season, Dunn played only two games for the first grade side before tearing his ACL in round 2. Dunn played eight games for North Queensland in the 2023 NRL season as the club finished 11th on the table. On 20 September, he was announced as one of nine North Queensland players not offered a contract for 2024.

== Coaching career ==
On 8 November 2023, Dunn was announced as North Queensland's Game Development Coach, a role that sees him work with junior rugby league coaches throughout north Queensland, as well as working with the club's academy. In September 2024, following the sacking of assistant coach James Maloney, Dunn began working as the Cowboys' on-field NRL trainer. In 2025, Dunn was reprimanded by the NRL after he sprayed water on the match ball.

== Achievements and accolades ==
=== Individual ===
- North Queensland Cowboys Coach's Award: 2020

=== Team ===
- 2020 NRL Nines: North Queensland Cowboys – Winners

== Statistics ==
=== NRL ===
Statistics are correct to the end of the 2022 season

Season	Team	Matches	T	G	GK %	F/G	Pts
2018	North Queensland	2	0	0	—	0	0
2019	North Queensland	9	0	0	—	0	0
2020	North Queensland	17	1	0	—	0	4
2021	North Queensland	20	2				8
2022	North Queensland	2					
2023	North Queensland	7					
Career totals		57	3	0	—	0	12
