= Treymain Spry =

Australian rugby league footballer

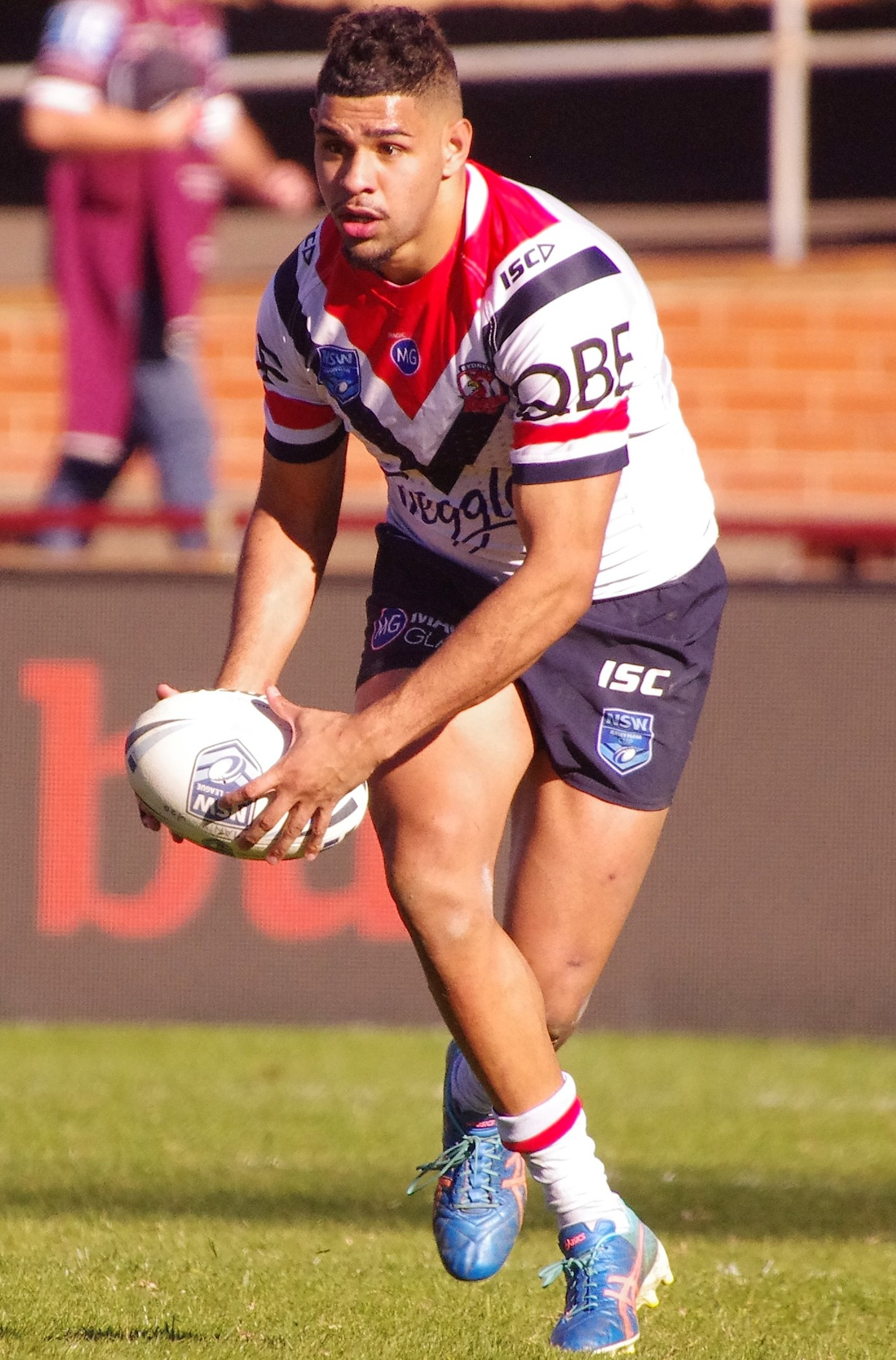

Personal information
- Born: 29 August 1999 (age 25); Ipswich, Queensland, Australia
- Height: 187 cm (6 ft 2 in)
- Weight: 98 kg (15 st 6 lb)

Playing information
- Position: Wing, Centre
Club
Years	Team	Pld	T	G	FG	P
2020	Gold Coast Titans	5	1	0	0	4
- Source: As of 11 October 2020

Treymain Spry (born 29 August 1999) is an Australian professional rugby league footballer who plays as a winger for the Tweed Heads Seagulls in the Queensland Cup.

He previously played for the Gold Coast Titans in the National Rugby League (NRL).

== Background ==
Born in Ipswich, Queensland, Spry, who is of Torres Strait Islander descent, played his junior rugby league for the Goodna Eagles and attended Redbank Plains State High School and Ipswich State High School before being signed by the Sydney Roosters.

== Playing career ==
In 2015, Spry played for the Ipswich Jets Cyril Connell Cup team. In 2016, he moved up to the club's Mal Meninga Cup team, playing two seasons with the side. In 2017, he represented the Queensland under-18 team in their 28–35 loss to New South Wales.

In 2018, Spry joined the Sydney Roosters Jersey Flegg Cup side, scoring 11 tries in 17 games. In 2019, returned to Queensland, signing with the Gold Coast Titans for two years. Despite still being eligible for the under-20s, he spent the entirety of the 2019 season playing for the Tweed Heads Seagulls in the Queensland Cup, scoring nine tries in 20 games. In July 2019, he represented the Queensland under-20 team.

=== 2020 ===
In Round 9 of the 2020 NRL season, Spry made his NRL debut against the New Zealand Warriors.

=== 2023 ===
In 2023 Spry was released from his playing contract by the Titans.

== Assault ==
On March 24, 2022, it was revealed Treymain Spry had been assaulted in Brisbane two weeks prior after being hit by another male. This caused a fractured skull and a brain bleed to Spry. He later recovered at home.
