= Tyson Smoothy =

Australian rugby league footballer

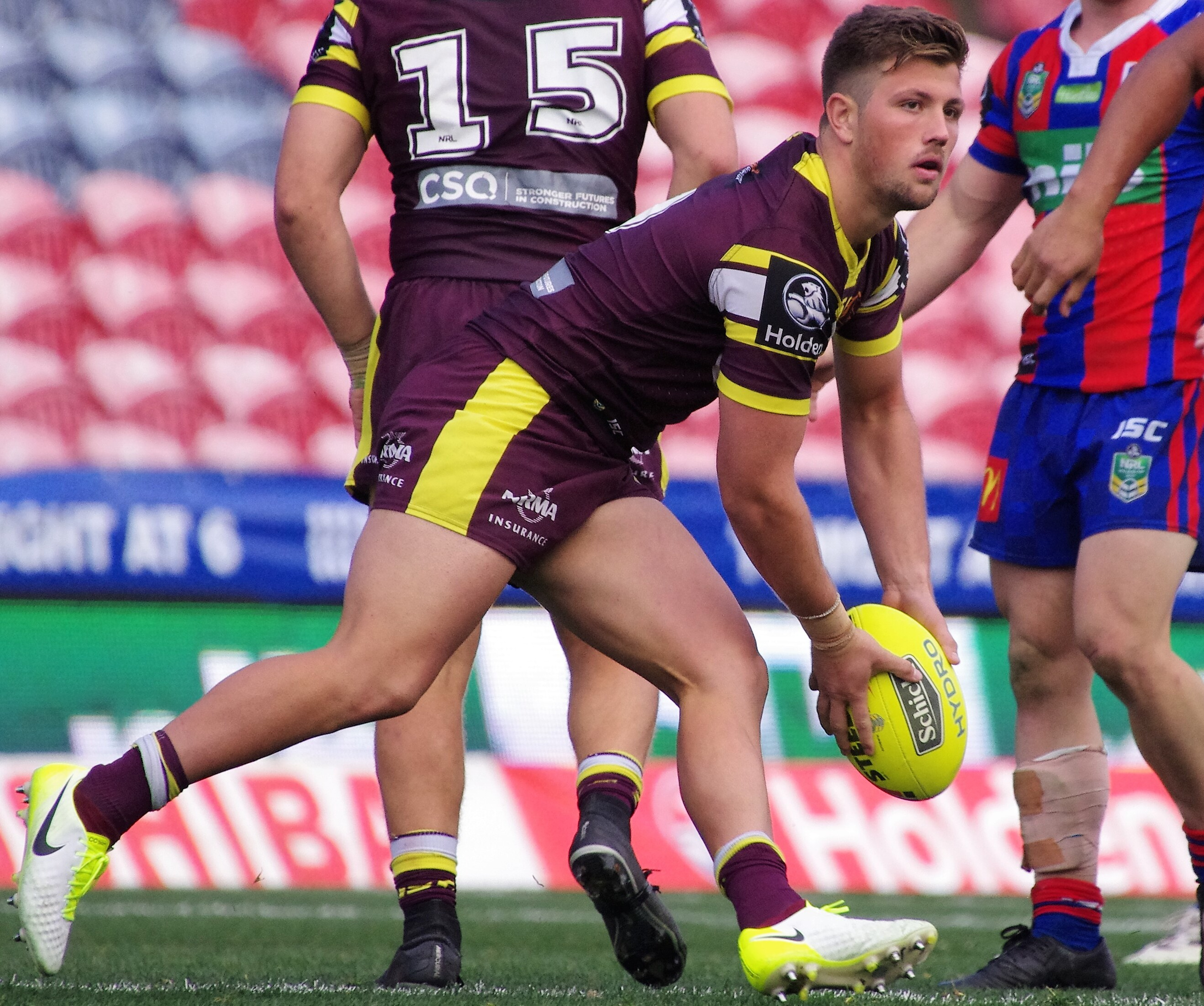

Personal information
- Full name: Tyson Smoothy
- Born: 7 July 1999 (age 27) Toowoomba, Queensland, Australia
- Height: 5 ft 11 in (1.81 m)
- Weight: 15 st 4 lb (97 kg)

Playing information
- Position: Hooker
Club
Years	Team	Pld	T	G	FG	P
2021	Melbourne Storm	4	0	3	0	6
2023–25	Brisbane Broncos	42	2	1	0	10
2026	Wakefield Trinity	31	6	4	0	32
2027–	Perth Bears	0	0	0	0	0
	Total	77	8	8	0	48
- Source: As of 16 November 2026

Tyson Smoothy (born 7 July 1999) is an Australian professional rugby league footballer who plays as a hooker for the Perth Bears in the NRL.

He previously played in the NRL for the Melbourne Storm and the Brisbane Broncos, where he won the 2025 NRL grand final.

== Background ==
Smoothy was born in Toowoomba, Queensland and raised on the Sunshine Coast. He was educated at Mountain Creek State High School and briefly Kawana Waters State College and played his junior rugby league for the Kawana Dolphins before being signed by the Brisbane Broncos.

== Playing career ==
In 2015, Smoothy represented Queensland under-16 in their win over New South Wales. In 2017, he played for the Brisbane Broncos under-20s side and captained Queensland under-18.

In 2018, Smoothy joined the Sunshine Coast Falcons in the Queensland Cup, playing for their under-20 side. In 2019, he was named Man of the Match in their under-20 Grand Final win over the Wynnum Manly Seagulls. In 2020, Smoothy joined the Penrith Panthers, playing for them in the NRL Nines and the New South Wales Cup.

=== 2021 ===
In 2021, Smoothy joined the Melbourne Storm on a train-and-trial deal.

In Round 1 of the 2021 NRL season, he made his NRL debut for the Melbourne club in their 26–18 win against South Sydney. On 6 October, he was released by the Melbourne club, having played only four games in the 2021 NRL season.

=== 2022 ===
Smoothy rejoined Sunshine Coast Falcons on full-time basis before being temporarily recalled by Melbourne Storm in Round 3 of the 2022 NRL season when their four first choice hookers were unavailable. He was named as a reserve, but was not required.

At the end of the 2022 Queensland Cup season, Smoothy was named as hooker in the competition's team of the season.

=== 2023 ===
Smoothy made his club debut for the Brisbane Broncos in his side's 24−20 victory over the Newcastle Knights in round 15 of the 2023 NRL season. He played a total of 13 games for Brisbane in the 2023 NRL season. He played in Brisbane's 26-24 loss against Penrith in the 2023 NRL Grand Final.

=== 2024 ===
Smoothy scored his first NRL try in the Brisbane Broncos in his side's 38-12 victory over the North Queensland Cowboys in round 4 of the 2024 NRL season. He played 18 games for Brisbane in the 2024 NRL season which saw the club miss the finals, finishing 12th on the table.

=== 2025 ===
On 13 February, it was announced that Smoothy would depart the Brisbane club at the end of the season to take up a three-year deal in the Super League with Wakefield Trinity. Smoothy started week three of the 2025 NRL finals series at lock filling in for the suspended Patrick Carrigan in a 16-14 win helping the Brisbane side make the 2025 NRL grand final. On 5 October, Smoothy was part of the 17 man squad that won the 2025 NRL grand final, ending a 19 year premiership drought.

=== 2026 ===
Smoothy made his competitive debut for Wakefield against Swinton Lions in the Challenge Cup, scoring in an 82-6 victory. He was a consistent figure and top performer in Daryl Powell's team, but on 27 July 2026, Wakefield announced that Smoothy would depart the club at the end of the season and join the Perth Bears in the NRL.

Smoothy went on to play a key role in Wakefield securing their highest-ever Super League finish in the 2026 season (4th place), before starring in their successful run through the play-offs, culminating in the club's maiden Super League Grand Final appearance and victory. He became just the second player, after Ben Harris, to win the NRL grand final and Super League Grand Final in consecutive seasons.

Smoothy left Wakefield having scored six tries, while he provided 20 try assists. He was named the club's Player of the Season.

=== Honours ===
Individual

- Queensland Cup Team Of The Year Hooker: 2022

Team

- Queensland Cup Minor-Premiership: 2019
- NRL Grand Finalist: 2023, 2025
- NRL Pre-Season Challenge Winner: 2024, 2025
- NRL Premiership: 2025
- Super League Champions 2026

== Statistics ==
Year	Team	Games	Tries	Goals	Pts
2021	Melbourne Storm	4		3	6
2023	Brisbane Broncos	13			
2024	Brisbane Broncos	18	2		8
2025	Brisbane Broncos	11		1	2
2026	Wakefield Trinity	31	6	4	32
2027	Perth Bears				
	Totals	77	8	8	48
