= Brendan Piakura =

Cook Islands international rugby league player

Personal information
- Born: 16 May 2002 (age 24) Newcastle, New South Wales, Australia
- Height: 189 cm (6 ft 2 in)
- Weight: 102 kg (16 st 1 lb)

Playing information
- Position: Second-row
Club
Years	Team	Pld	T	G	FG	P
2021–	Brisbane Broncos	66	9	0	0	36
Representative
Years	Team	Pld	T	G	FG	P
2022–25	Cook Islands	6	1	0	0	4
- Source: As of 16 July 2026

Brendan Piakura (born 16 May 2002) is a Cook Islands international rugby league footballer who plays as a second-row forward for the Brisbane Broncos in the National Rugby League, with whom he won the 2025 NRL Grand Final.

== Background ==
Piakura was born in Newcastle, New South Wales and raised on the Gold Coast, Queensland. He is of Cook Islands descent.

He played his junior rugby league for the Helensvale Hornets and attended Coombabah State High School and Palm Beach Currumbin State High School before being signed by the Brisbane Broncos.

== Playing career ==
=== Early career ===
In 2018, Piakura represented the Queensland under-16 team.

In 2019, he played for the Tweed Heads Seagulls in the Mal Meninga Cup, starting at second row in their state and national finals wins. In June 2019, he represented the Queensland under-18 team. In September 2019, he represented the Australian Schoolboys in their 36–20 win over the Junior Kiwis.

=== 2021 ===
Piakura began the season playing for the Norths Devils in the Queensland Cup.

On 15 April, he re-signed with the Brisbane club until the end of the 2024 season.

In Round 24 of the 2021 NRL season, Piakura made his NRL debut for Brisbane in a loss to the Cronulla-Sutherland Sharks. He was sin-binned six minutes into his debut for a late tackle on Cronulla halfback Braydon Trindall, and was later suspended for two games.

Piakura, once completing his two match suspension, played for Norths Devils in the Queensland cup finals, playing in wins over Tweed Heads Seagulls and Burleigh Bears. Piakura failed a HIA against Burleigh Bears in the preliminary final five minutes into the game and missed the Grand Final win over Wynnum Manly Seagulls the following week as a result of failing the HIA.

=== 2022 ===
Piakura had an injury disrupted season with a calf injury and concussions forcing Piakura to miss games across the year limiting Piakura to one NRL game for the Brisbane Broncos in Round 25 in a 22–12 loss against St. George Illawarra Dragons. Piakura played in Norths Devils 16–10 victory over the Redcliffe Dolphins in the 2022 Queensland Cup Grand Final, starting in the second-row.

=== 2023 ===
In round 15 of the 2023 NRL season, Piakura scored his first NRL try in a 24–20 win over the Newcastle Knights. He played a total of 13 games for Brisbane in the 2023 NRL season. He played in Brisbane's 26-24 loss against Penrith in the 2023 NRL Grand Final.

=== 2024 ===
Piakura played 18 games for Brisbane in the 2024 NRL season which saw the club miss the finals finishing 12th on the table.

=== 2025 ===
Piakura played 21 matches for Brisbane in the 2025 NRL season including the clubs 2025 NRL Grand Final victory over Melbourne.

=== 2026 ===
Piakura played 12 games for Brisbane in the 2026 NRL season as the club finished 14th on the table.

== Statistics ==
Year	Team	Games	Tries	Pts
2021	Brisbane Broncos	1		
2022	Brisbane Broncos	1		
2023	Brisbane Broncos	13	2	8
2024	Brisbane Broncos	18	3	12
2025	Brisbane Broncos	21	2	8
2026	Brisbane Broncos	12	2	8
	Totals	66	9	36
