= Jaydn Su'A =

Samoa international rugby league footballer

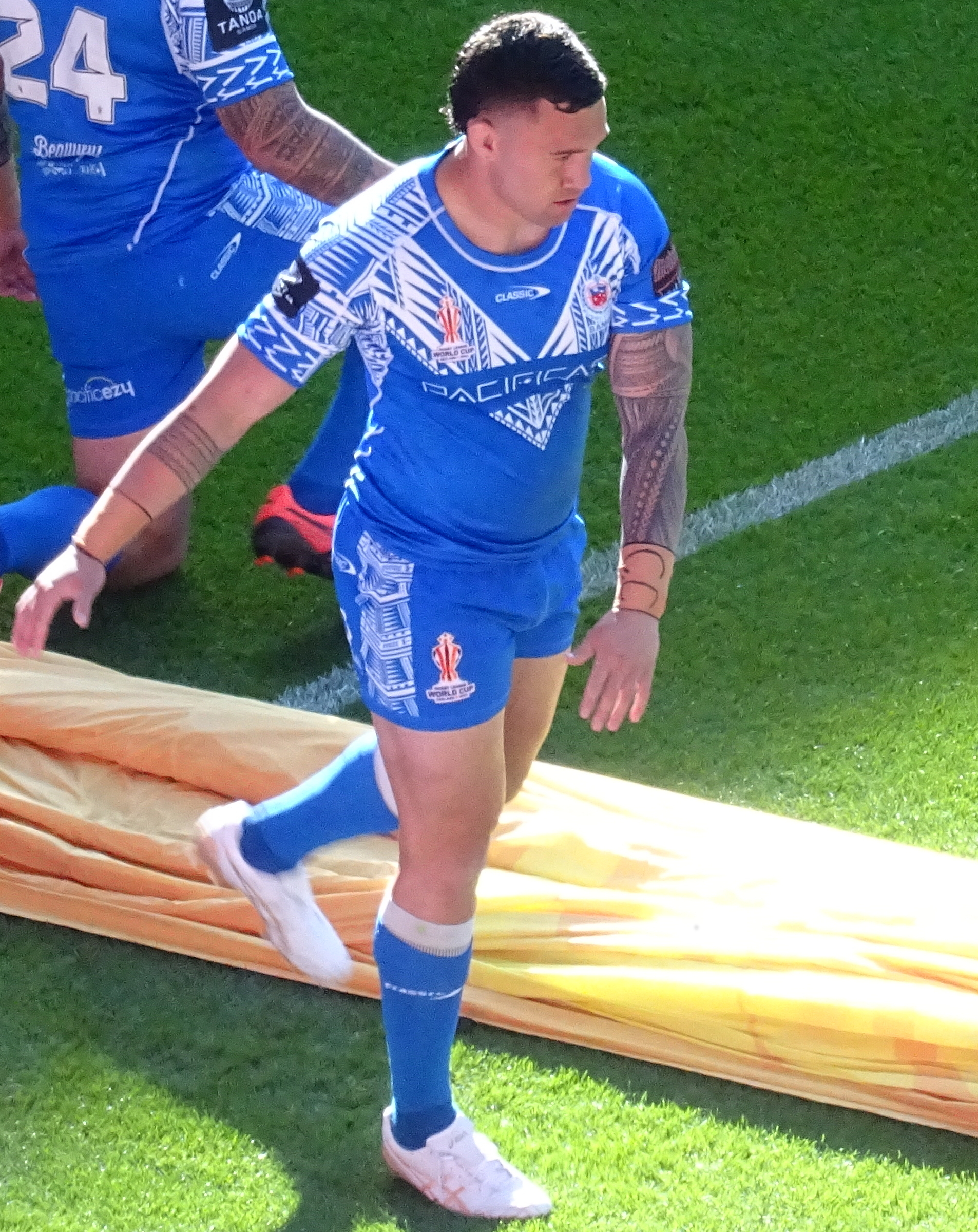

Personal information
- Full name: Jaydn Su'A
- Born: 23 October 1997 (age 29) Christchurch, New Zealand
- Height: 188 cm (6 ft 2 in)
- Weight: 100 kg (15 st 10 lb)

Playing information
- Position: Second-row
Club
Years	Team	Pld	T	G	FG	P
2016–19	Brisbane Broncos	31	1	0	0	4
2019–21	South Sydney	52	7	0	0	28
2022–26	St. George Illawarra	79	23	0	0	92
2027-	Parramatta Eels	0	0	0	0	0
	Total	162	31	0	0	124
Representative
Years	Team	Pld	T	G	FG	P
2019–25	Samoa	10	1	0	0	4
2020–24	Queensland	6	0	0	0	0
- Source: As of 16 November 2026

Jaydn Su'A (born 23 October 1997) is a Samoa international rugby league footballer who plays as a second-row forward for the Parramatta Eels in the National Rugby League (NRL).

He previously played for the Brisbane Broncos and South Sydney Rabbitohs in the NRL, and at representative level for Queensland in the State of Origin series.

== Background ==
Su'A was born in Christchurch, New Zealand. He is of Samoan descent and moved to Australia at the age of two.

He attended Marsden State High School and later Anglican Church Grammar School, where he played for their rugby union team. He played his junior rugby league for the Logan Brothers, before being signed by the Canberra Raiders at the age of 13. After two years on a scholarship with the Raiders, he signed with the Brisbane Broncos.

== Playing career ==
=== Early career ===
In 2012, Su'A played in the Souths Logan Magpies' Cyril Connell Cup and National Title winning sides as a 15-year-old. In 2013, he represented the Queensland under-16 rugby league team. In 2015, he joined the Brisbane Broncos' NYC team. That year, he represented the Queensland under-18 rugby league team, scoring a try and being named Man of the Match.

=== 2016 ===
On 7 May, Su'A represented the Junior Kangaroos and was named Man of the Match in their win over the Junior Kiwis. In Round 12 of the 2016 NRL season, he made his NRL debut for the Broncos against the Wests Tigers. On 13 July, he captained the Queensland under-20 rugby league team. In September, he was named at second-row in the 2016 NYC Team of the Year. In September, he re-signed with the Broncos on a 2-year contract until the end of 2018.

=== 2017 ===
In the 2017 NRL season, Su'A was limited to only 4 first grade appearances for Brisbane and did not feature in the club's finals campaign.

=== 2018 ===
In the 2018 NRL season, Su'A made 15 appearances for Brisbane, but missed out on playing in the club's finals campaign due to injury.

=== 2019 ===
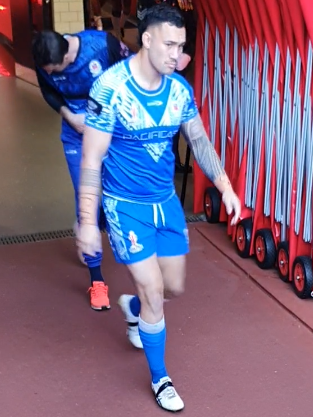
Su'A walking out to warm-up for Samoa at the 2021 RLWC in 2022

At the start of the 2019 NRL season, Su'A made 8 appearances for Brisbane as they lost 8 of their first 13 games which was one of the worst beginnings to a season in the club's history. On 28 June, Su'A signed a two-year contract to join South Sydney in a mid-season switch from Brisbane. Su'A made his debut for South Sydney against Manly-Warringah in Round 17 at ANZ Stadium which ended in a 21–20 victory.

=== 2020 ===
Throughout the 2020 NRL season, Su'A made 21 appearances for South Sydney, establishing himself as one of the competition's most improved players. Su'A was selected in the Queensland rugby league team for the 2020 State of Origin series. He made his debut in Game One, playing a solid 48 minutes off the bench as Queensland upset New South Wales.

=== 2021 ===
In the 2021 NRL Season, Su'A reinforced the previous years success, playing an instrumental role that helped the Rabbitohs achieve a Top 4 finish. In Round 8, Su'a scored his first try of the season in a 34-20 point win over the Canberra Raiders. In Round 19, Su'A scored 2 tries against the New Zealand Warriors in a match that saw the Rabbitohs win 60–22.

On 21 July, Su'A signed a three-year deal with St. George Illawarra.

Su'A played a total of 23 games for South Sydney in the 2021 NRL season, including the club's 2021 NRL Grand Final defeat against Penrith.

=== 2022 ===
In Round 1 of the 2022 NRL season, he made his club debut for St. George Illawarra in their 28–16 victory over the New Zealand Warriors. In Rounds 2 and 3, Su'A was sent to the sin bin in consecutive weeks for dangerous tackles.

Throughout 2022, Su'A played 18 games as St. George Illawarra finished tenth, missing finals for fourth straight season.

In October Su'A was named in the Samoa squad for the 2021 Rugby League World Cup. Su'A played for Samoa in their 2021 Rugby League World Cup final loss to Australia.

=== 2023 ===
Su'A played a total of 13 games for St. George Illawarra in the 2023 NRL season as they finished 16th on the table.

=== 2024 ===
Su’A was named in the second row for Queensland ahead of game one in the 2024 State of Origin series. In round 22 of the 2024 NRL season, Su'A scored two tries for St. George Illawarra in their 18–16 upset victory over Melbourne. He played a total of 22 games for St. George Illawarra in the 2024 NRL season and scored nine tries as the club finished 11th on the table.

=== 2025 ===
Su'A in 2026

In round 9 of the 2025 NRL season, Su'A was involved in one of the biggest bombed tries of the year. St. George Illawarra were trailing the match against the Wests Tigers by ten points when Su'A crossed to score a try right before half-dived across the tryline to score a try. As Su'A went to ground the ball,, it came off his knee and he lost it forwards. Jahream Bula from the Wests Tigers then picked up the ball in his own in-goal area and raced 105 metres to score a try at the other end of the field. St George Illawarra would end up losing the match by six points. Su'A played 18 matches for St. George Illawarra in the 2025 NRL season as the club finished a disappointing 15th on the table.

=== 2026 ===
On 11 April it was reported that Su'A informed team mates he would be departing the club at the end of the season. The St. George Illawarra club confirmed hours later that Su'A would depart at the end of the season. On 17 April, Parramatta announced that they had signed Su'A on a three year deal. In round 7 of the 2026 NRL season, Su'A became the first player to be sent off in two years during the clubs loss to South Sydney. Su'A played only eight matches for St. George Illawarra in the 2026 NRL season as the club finished with the Wooden Spoon.

== Statistics ==
Year	Team	Games	Tries	Pts
2016	Brisbane Broncos	4		
2017	Brisbane Broncos	4		
2018	Brisbane Broncos	15	1	4
2019	Brisbane Broncos	8		
2019	South Sydney Rabbitohs	8		
2020	South Sydney Rabbitohs	21	2	8
2021	South Sydney Rabbitohs	23	5	20
2022	St. George Illawarra Dragons	18	5	20
2023	St. George Illawarra Dragons	13	4	16
2024	St. George Illawarra Dragons	22	9	36
2025	St. George Illawarra Dragons	18	4	16
2026	St. George Illawarra Dragons	8	1	4
	Totals	162	31	120
