= Keegan Hipgrave =

Australian rugby league player

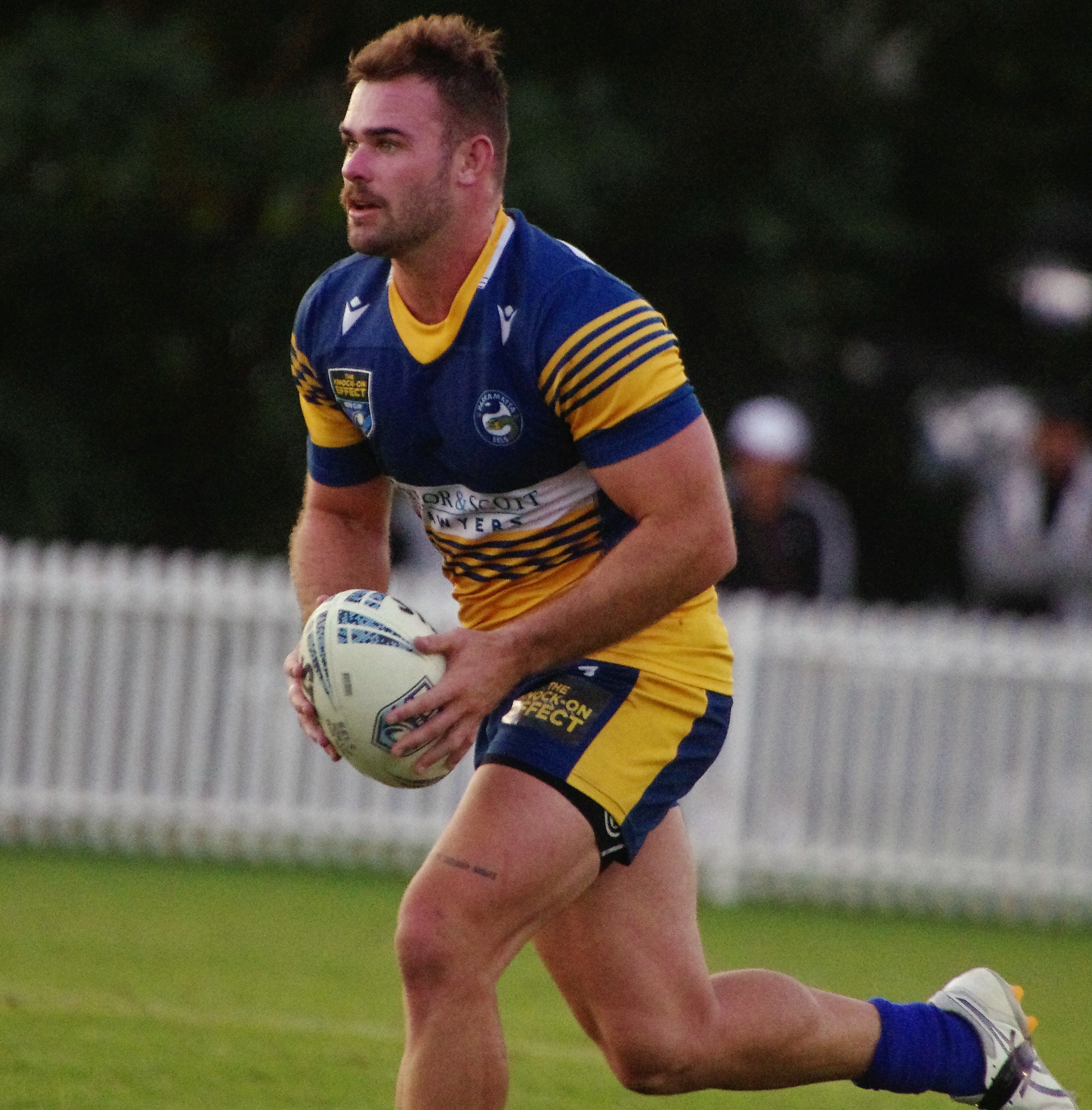

Personal information
- Born: 1 January 1997 (age 29) Gold Coast, Queensland, Australia
- Height: 183 cm (6 ft 0 in)
- Weight: 102 kg (16 st 1 lb)

Playing information
- Position: Second-row
Club
| Years | Team | Pld | T | G | FG | P |
|---|---|---|---|---|---|---|
| 2017–20 | Gold Coast Titans | 40 | 3 | 0 | 0 | 12 |
| 2021 | Parramatta Eels | 9 | 0 | 0 | 0 | 0 |
| | Total | 49 | 3 | 0 | 0 | 12 |
- Source: As of 13 May 2021

Keegan Hipgrave (born 1 January 1997) is an Australian former professional rugby league footballer who last played as a second-row forward for the Parramatta Eels in the NRL. He since retired from rugby league after five years playing first grade.

== Background ==
Hipgrave was born on the Gold Coast, Queensland, Australia on 1 January 1997.

He played his junior rugby league for the Nerang Roosters and attended Palm Beach Currumbin State High School, before being signed by the Brisbane Broncos.

== Playing career ==
=== Early career ===
In 2013, Hipgrave played for Gold Coast Green in the Cyril Connell Cup and represented the Queensland under-16 side. In 2014, he played for Gold Coast White in the Mal Meninga Cup and was selected for the Queensland under-18 and Australian Schoolboys sides. From 2015 to 2017, he played for the Brisbane Broncos' NYC team. In 2015, he captained the Queensland under-18 side.

=== 2017 ===
In May, Hipgrave made a mid-season move to the Gold Coast Titans on a contract until the end of 2018, before playing for the Queensland under-20s team against the New South Wales under-20s team later that month. In round 26 of the 2017 NRL season, he made his NRL debut for the Titans against the Sydney Roosters.

=== 2018 ===
In round 14 against the South Sydney Rabbitohs, Hipgrave was sent to the sin bin twice in the same match for two professional fouls he committed, becoming the first player since 2002 to have been involved in such an incident.

=== 2019 ===
On 5 August, Hipgrave was ruled out for the rest of the 2019 NRL season. Hipgrave made a total of 7 appearances for the year.

=== 2020 ===
Hipgrave returned from injury against the North Queensland Cowboys in round 3, from a series of concussions that nearly stopped his career. In round 4, he scored his first try against the Wests Tigers in a 28–23 win.

On 7 November 2020, Hipgrave signed a two-year deal with the Parramatta Eels.

=== 2021 ===
He made his debut for Parramatta in round 1 of the 2021 NRL season, coming off the interchange bench in the club's 24–16 victory over Brisbane.

Hipgrave announced his immediate retirement from rugby league on 12 November 2021 from medical advice, following a concussion late in the 2021 NRL season.
