= Pat O'Hanlon =

Australian rugby league footballer

Patrick O'Hanlon
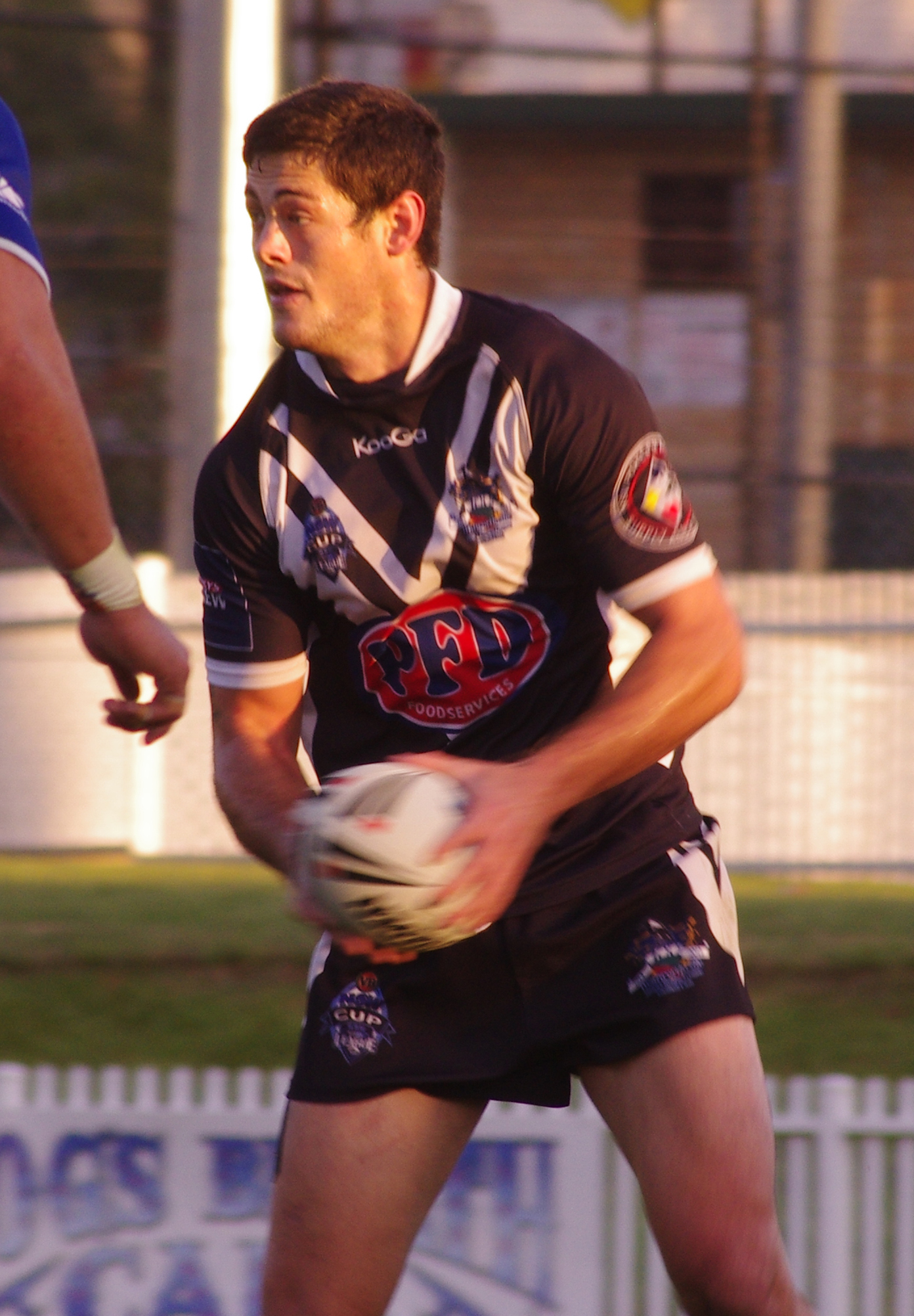

Personal information
- Born: 14 March 1991 (age 35) Bundaberg, Queensland, Australila

Playing information
- Height: 1.95 m (6 ft 5 in)
- Weight: 102 kg (16 st 1 lb)
- Position: Second-row, Centre
Club
Years	Team	Pld	T	G	FG	P
2011–13	Parramatta Eels	20	1	0	0	4
2014–16	Canterbury Bulldogs	12	0	0	0	0
	Total	32	1	0	0	4

Patrick O'Hanlon is an Australian former professional rugby league footballer who played 17 games for Canterbury-Bankstown Bulldogs and 35 games for Parramatta Eels in the National Rugby League.

== National Youth Competition ==
A Mackay Brothers junior, O'Hanlon was signed by Parramatta after being selected for Queensland U/18's & Australian schoolboys. Dominating in 2010 and 2011, O'Hanlon in 2010 was named on the bench to play first grade against the New Zealand Warriors in round 17, but did not play.

== NRL career ==
O'Hanlon made his NRL debut in round 17, 2011 against the Brisbane Broncos, coming off the bench to play centre for the injured Jacob Loko. O'Hanlon played nine games in his debut season for Parramatta as the club narrowly avoided the wooden spoon. Parramatta defeated the Gold Coast in the final round of the regular season at Cbus Super Stadium to avoid the dreaded award.

O'Hanlon scored his first try in round 3, 2012 against the North Queensland Cowboys.

O'Hanlon signed with Canterbury-Bankstown for the 2014 NRL season.

== Injury and retirement ==
In the first week of the 2014 NRL finals series, O'Hanlon suffered a compound left leg fracture. After playing a handful of games in the NSW Cup in 2015, O'Hanlon struggled to gain enough strength to play with confidence. O'Hanlon retired after the 2016 season.
