= Lloyd Perrett =

NZ rugby league footballer

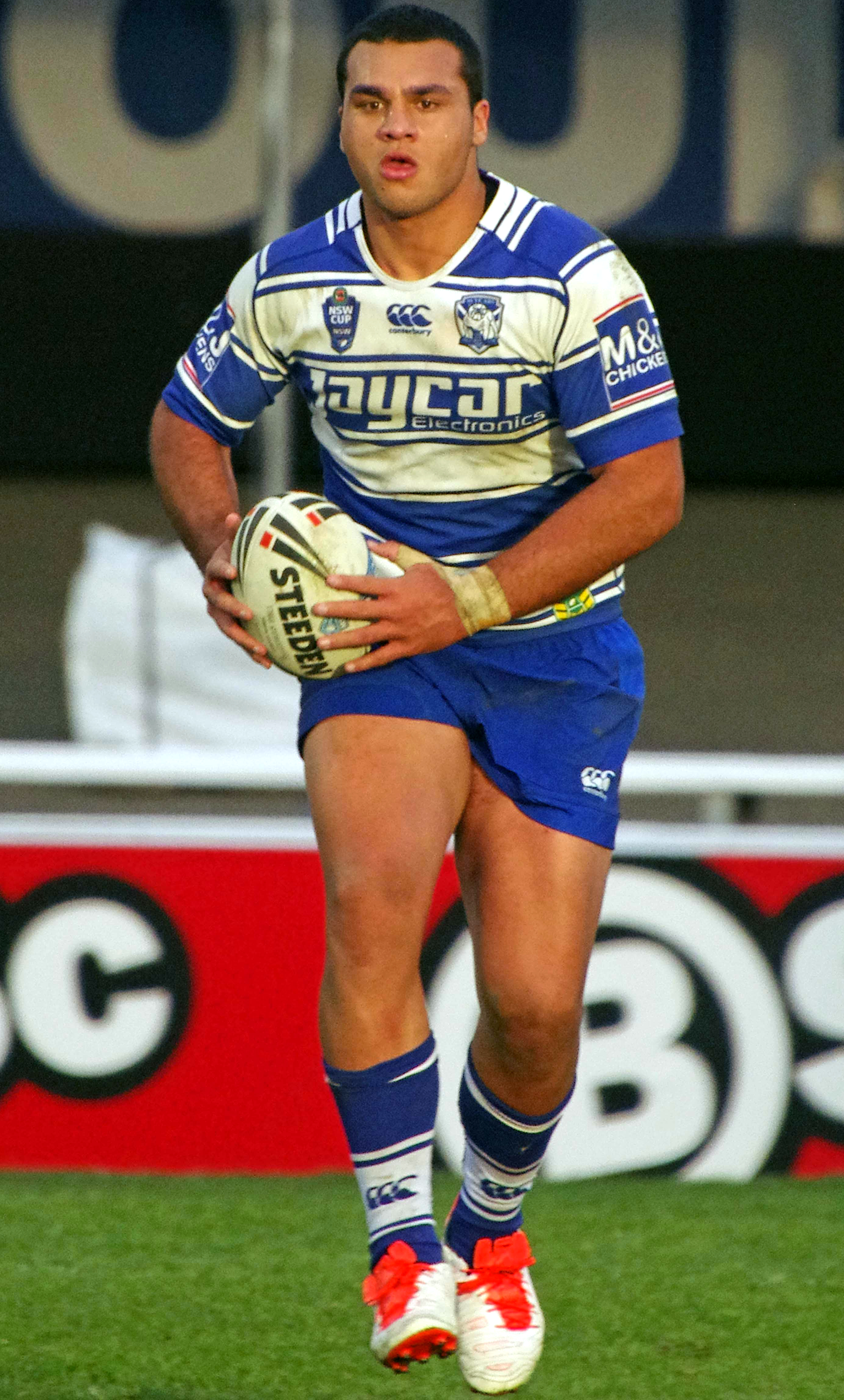

Personal information
- Born: 17 December 1994 (age 31) Hamilton, New Zealand
- Height: 194 cm (6 ft 4 in)
- Weight: 115 kg (18 st 2 lb)

Playing information
- Position: Prop
Club
Years	Team	Pld	T	G	FG	P
2014–17	Canterbury Bulldogs	24	0	0	0	0
2017–19	Manly Sea Eagles	32	2	0	0	8
	Total	56	2	0	0	8
- Source: As of 6 November 2019
- Relatives: Sam Perrett (brother)

Lloyd Perrett (born 17 December 1994) is a professional rugby league footballer who plays as a prop for the Ormeau Shearers DMC side.

He previously played for the Canterbury-Bankstown Bulldogs and the Manly Warringah Sea Eagles in the National Rugby League.

== Background ==
Perrett was born in Hamilton, New Zealand. He is of Māori and Samoan descent moved to the Gold Coast, Queensland at the age of 4. Perrett is the younger brother of former Canterbury-Bankstown Bulldogs player Sam Perrett.

He played his junior rugby league for the Burleigh Bears, before being signed by the Sydney Roosters.

== Playing career ==
=== Early career ===
In June 2012, Perrett joined the Canterbury-Bankstown Bulldogs mid-season effective immediately, following his brother Sam. In 2012 and 2013, he played for the Bulldogs' NYC team.

On 20 April 2013, he played for the Queensland under-20s team against the New South Wales under-20s team.

On 13 October 2013, he played for the Junior Kangaroos against the Junior Kiwis.

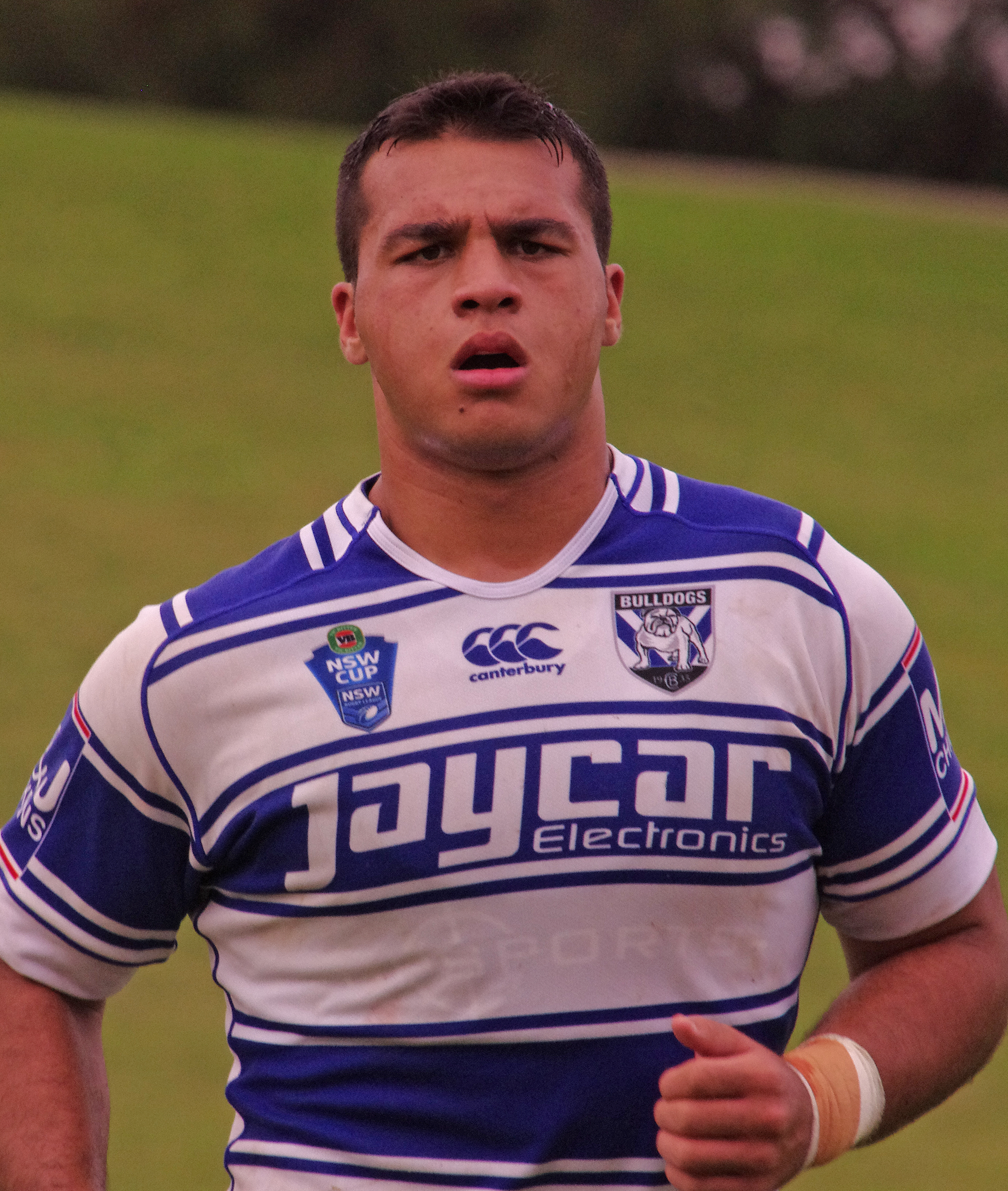
Perrett playing for the Bulldogs in 2014

=== 2014 ===
In 2014, Perrett graduated to Canterbury's New South Wales Cup team.

On 3 May, he again played for the Queensland under-20s team against the New South Wales under-20s team.

In Round 15 of the 2014 NRL season, he made his NRL debut for Canterbury against the Canberra Raiders, playing off the interchange bench in the clubs 22–14 win at Canberra Stadium. In Round 23 against arch-rivals the Parramatta Eels, he suffered a season ending ankle injury in Canterbury's 18–16 win at ANZ Stadium. He finished off his debut year in the NRL, having played in eight matches for the Canterbury club. On 1 December, he re-signed with Canterbury on a four-year contract.

=== 2015 ===
On 31 January and 1 February, Perrett played for Canterbury in the 2015 NRL Auckland Nines. He finished off the 2015 season having played in 14 games for the Canterbury club.

=== 2016 ===
On 12 January, Perrett was selected in the QAS Emerging Maroons squad.

In September, he was named on the interchange bench in the 2016 Intrust Super Premiership NSW Team of the Year.

On 9 December, he signed a three-year contract with the Manly Warringah Sea Eagles starting in 2017, after being released from the final 2 years of his Bulldogs contract.

=== 2017 ===
Perrett was named in the Sea Eagles squad for the 2017 NRL Auckland Nines.

He made his NRL debut for Manly against the Parramatta Eels in round one of the 2017 season.

In round 23 against the Wests Tigers, Perrett scored his first NRL career try in Manly's 26–30 loss at Leichhardt Oval.

=== 2018 ===
Perrett suffered a heat stroke during pre-season testing and was rushed to hospital. Perrett was unable to complete the majority of the 2018 pre-season. He managed to play 13 games in the 2018 season, averaging a light 18 minutes per game.

He was also the only Manly player happy to see the exit of Coach Trent Barrett, as it appeared Perrett was not accustomed to Barrett's coaching style.

=== 2019 ===
Like the previous season, Perrett spent most of his 2019 pre-season on the bench due to lack of fitness with completing Hasler's training regimes. Perrett was off-contract beyond 2019. Unfortunately, Perrett's playing career at Manly appeared slim, as he took part in playing both his trial games alongside reserve grade players.

On 6 May, Perrett was selected for the Canterbury Cup NSW residents side to play against the Queensland residents representative team.

Perrett featured in both of Manly's finals matches after the club finished in 6th place at the end of the regular season. Perrett started both games from the bench as Manly reached the second week of the finals series before they were eliminated by South Sydney 34–26 at ANZ Stadium.

In November 2019, it was announced that Perrett had been released by Manly-Warringah. On 26 November, it was revealed that Perrett was on a train and trial contract with the Brisbane Broncos.

== Statistics ==
Year	Team	Games	Tries	Pts
2014	Canterbury-Bankstown Bulldogs	8		
2015	Canterbury-Bankstown Bulldogs	14		
2016	Canterbury-Bankstown Bulldogs	2		
2017	Manly Warringah Sea Eagles	15	1	4
2018	Manly Warringah Sea Eagles	13	1	4
2019	Manly Warringah Sea Eagles	3		
	Totals	56	2	12

== Post NRL ==
Perrett on May 1, 2024, said he had sought legal advice to sue his former team Manly-Warringah after suffering his heat stroke which ultimately ended his NRL career after he suffered a seizure during a pre-season training session after being denied water during training. Perrett had said he was launching legal action to hold the training staff accountable because of what happened to Keith Titmuss being Perrett's final straw. Perrett said he has been wracked with survivors guilt since and speaks regularly with a therapist, and paperwork with the courts would be actioned in the coming months. On September 18, 2024, it was announced that Perrett had taken steps in moving forward with suing the Manly club and his legal team requested documents of Perrett's time playing for Manly. On 9 February 2026, it was announced that Perrett had moved forward with his legal case as Manly claimed that Perrett arrived to pre-season out of shape and 'forgot his water bottle'.
