= John Radel =

Australian rugby league footballer (born 2003)

Johnny Radel
Personal information
- Full name: John Radel
- Born: 5 March 2003 (age 23) Taroom, Queensland, Australia
- Height: 190 cm (6 ft 3 in)
- Weight: 100 kg (15 st 10 lb)

Playing information
- Position: Prop
Club
Years	Team	Pld	T	G	FG	P
2026–	South Sydney	4	2	0	0	8
- Source: RLP

John Radel (born 5 March 2003) is an Australian rugby league footballer for the South Sydney Rabbitohs in the National Rugby League (NRL).

== Early life ==
Hailing from Taroom, Queensland, Radel picked up rugby league at the age of six and spent his early years with the Wandoan Wildcats, which were the nearest club despite being at least an hours drive away.

Radel boarded at St Peters Lutheran College in Brisbane from the eighth grade, where he competed in schoolboys rugby league, while also playing for the West Brisbane Panthers. In 2019, Radel earned Queensland Schoolboys and Queensland Country under-16s representative honours.

== Career ==
Radel, a prop, began playing for the Wynnum Manly Seagulls upon finishing school and was the club's 2023 "Colts Player of the Year". He moved to the Mackay Cutters in 2024, winning their Queensland Cup "Player of the Year" award his first season. During him time in Mackay, Radel trialled with the North Queensland Cowboys without securing a contract. After another season with the Cutters in 2025, Radel was signed by the Rabbitohs on a two-year deal.

In the 2026 NRL season, Radel made four appearances for the Rabbitohs, scoring a try on debut coming on off the bench against the Brisbane Broncos in round 15.
