= Ethan Bullemor =

Australian rugby league footballer

Personal information
- Full name: Ethan Bullemor
- Born: 21 February 2000 (age 26) Emerald, Queensland, Australia
- Height: 190 cm (6 ft 3 in)
- Weight: 110 kg (17 st 5 lb)

Playing information
- Position: Second-row, Prop
Club
Years	Team	Pld	T	G	FG	P
2020–21	Brisbane Broncos	25	3	0	0	12
2022–	Manly Sea Eagles	98	12	0	0	48
	Total	123	15	0	0	60
Representative
Years	Team	Pld	T	G	FG	P
2024	Prime Minister's XIII	1	0	0	0	0
- Source: As of 26 July 2026

Ethan Bullemor (born 21 February 2000) is an Australian professional rugby league footballer who plays as a prop forward for the Manly Warringah Sea Eagles in the National Rugby League (NRL).

He previously played for the Brisbane Broncos in the NRL.

== Background ==
Bullemor was born in Emerald, Queensland, but was raised in Springsure, Queensland. Bullemor attended St Joseph's College, Nudgee where he achieved an OP 1 and played in the first XV Rugby.

== Playing career ==
Bullemor made his first grade debut in round 2 of the 2020 NRL season for the Brisbane Broncos against South Sydney starting from the bench.

He made a total of 8 appearances for Brisbane in the 2020 NRL season as the club finished last on the table and claimed the wooden spoon.

In round 6 of the 2021 NRL season, Bullemor scored his first top grade try in the 20–12 loss.

In Round 16 of the 2021 NRL season, Bullemor ran for over 100 run metres in a game for the first time in his career as well scoring his 2nd career try in a 26–18 win against Cronulla-Sutherland. In round 1 of the 2022 NRL season, Bullemor made his club debut for Manly in their 28–6 defeat against Penrith scoring a try. Bullemor played a total of 12 games for Manly in the 2022 NRL season as the club finished 11th on the table.

=== 2023 ===
Bullemor played 23 games for Manly in the 2023 NRL season as the club finished 12th on the table and missed the finals.

=== 2024 ===
Bullemor played 23 games for Manly in the 2024 NRL season as they finished 7th on the table and qualified for the finals. Manly would be eliminated in the second week of the finals by the Sydney Roosters. Bullemor was named and played for the PM's XIII squad in Australia's match against PNG.

=== 2025 ===
On 1 August, Manly announced that they had re-signed Bullemor until the end of 2029. Bullemor played 24 games for Manly in the 2025 NRL season as the club finished 10th on the table.

=== 2026 ===
Bullemor played 16 matches for Manly in the 2026 NRL season as the club finished 9th on the table.

== Statistics ==
Year	Team	Games	Tries	Pts
2020	Brisbane Broncos	8		
2021	Brisbane Broncos	17	3	12
2022	Manly Warringah Sea Eagles	12	2	8
2023	Manly Warringah Sea Eagles	23	1	4
2024	Manly Warringah Sea Eagles	23	3	12
2025	Manly Warringah Sea Eagles	24	5	20
2026	Manly Warringah Sea Eagles	16	1	4
	Totals	123	15	60
