= Luke Bateman =

Australian rugby league footballer

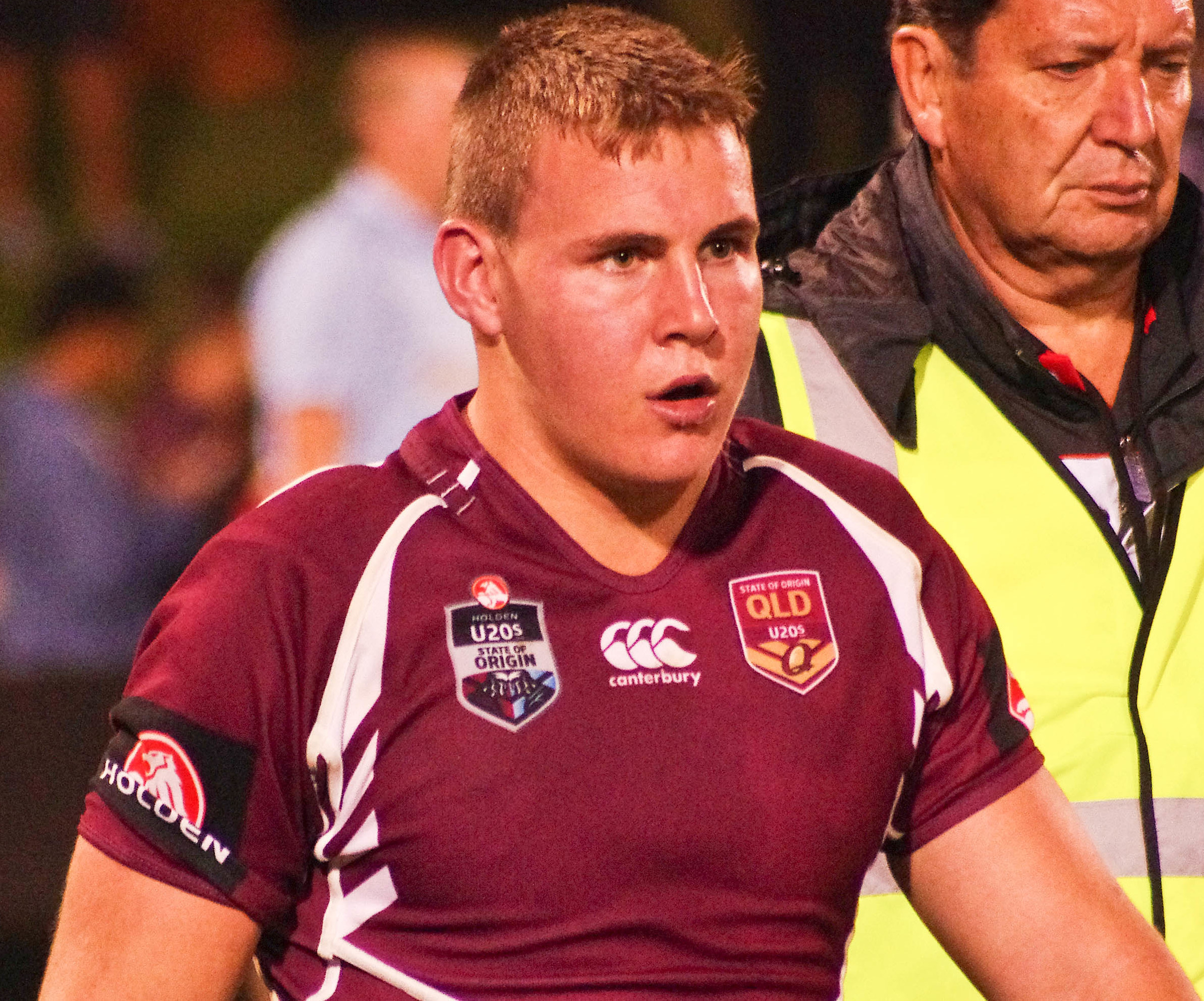

Personal information
- Born: 23 January 1995 (age 31) Toowoomba, Queensland, Australia
- Height: 182 cm (6 ft 0 in)
- Weight: 100 kg (15 st 10 lb)

Playing information
- Position: Lock
Club
Years	Team	Pld	T	G	FG	P
2015–19	Canberra Raiders	71	1	0	0	4
- Source: As of 20 July 2019

Luke Bateman (born 23 January 1995) is an Australian former professional rugby league footballer and influencer.

== Early life and education ==
Luke Bateman was born on 23 January 1995 in Toowoomba, Queensland, Australia.

Bateman played his junior football for the Souths Logan Magpies and Miles Devils, before being signed by the Canberra Raiders.

== Playing career ==
=== Early career ===
From 2013 to 2015, Bateman played for the Canberra Raiders' NYC team, captaining the side in 2014 and 2015. On 20 April 2013, Bateman played for the Queensland under-20s team against the New South Wales under-20s team, playing off the interchange bench in the 36-12 loss at Penrith Stadium. In February 2014, Bateman was selected in the Canberra Raiders 2014 Auckland Nines squad. On 3 May 2014, Bateman again played for the Queensland under-20s team against the New South Wales under-20s team, starting at lock and scoring a try in the 30-8 loss at Penrith Stadium. During the match, Bateman was sledged by halfback Mitchell Moses, calling him a ‘’fucking gay cunt’’ heard by the live TV audience and Moses was later slapped with a 2-match suspension for his derogatory comments. On 26 September 2014, Bateman extended his contract with the Raiders from the end of 2015 to the end of 2016.

=== 2015–2019 ===
In January 2015, Bateman was selected in the Raiders 2015 Auckland Nines squad. In Round 1 of the 2015 NRL season, Bateman made his NRL debut for the Canberra Raiders against the Cronulla-Sutherland Sharks, playing off the interchange bench in the 24-20 win at Shark Park. On 8 July 2015, Bateman played for the Queensland under-20s team against the New South Wales under-20s team for the third year in a row, playing in the starting team and scoring a try in the 32-16 loss at Suncorp Stadium. Bateman finished his debut year in the NRL with him playing in 6 matches for the Raiders in the 2015 NRL season.

Bateman was selected in the 2016 Auckland Nines squad with the Raiders. On 12 August 2016, Bateman extended his contract with the Raiders to the end of the 2018 season. Bateman finished the 2016 NRL season playing in 21 matches for the Raiders.

Bateman was selected in the Raiders 2017 Auckland Nines squad. In Round 21 against the South Sydney Rabbitohs, Bateman scored his first career NRL try in the 32-18 win at ANZ Stadium. Bateman finished the 2017 NRL season playing in 22 matches and scoring 1 try for the Raiders.

On 7 May 2018, Bateman extended his contract with Canberra to the end of the 2019 season. Bateman finished the 2018 NRL season playing in 22 matches.

Bateman suffered a significant knee injury and made no appearances for Canberra in the 2019 NRL season.

== Personal life ==
Bateman says that he has loved reading since childhood, but felt he had to repress this love during his career in professional rugby league, where reading was regarded as a "feminine thing".

After he had a breakdown precipitated by a gambling addiction, he went to live on his family farm. In August 2026, he spoke to a parliamentary inquiry addressing the betting industry in Australia, calling on the government to put limits to gambling advertisements.

== Post-playing career ==
=== Reality television ===
On 9 July 2023, Bateman was announced as one of the stars of season 11 of The Bachelors Australia. The season aired in December 2023.

In 2026, Bateman appeared in the twelfth season of I'm a Celebrity...Get Me Out of Here!. He finished in the top 3, losing out to Concetta Caristo who was crowned Queen of the Jungle on Sunday 22 February 2026.

=== Social media and other activities ===
During Bateman's self-isolation on his farm, he posted about a book on TikTok, which he recorded on his tractor. This post went viral. He became a member of the BookTok community on TikTok, where he frequently posts book reviews, with a particular interest in the fantasy genre. As of May 2026, Bateman had over 441,000 followers on TikTok and 612,000 followers on Instagram.

In May 2025, Bateman signed a two-book deal for a fantasy series with Atria Books, an imprint of Simon & Schuster Australia.
