= Tyrone Phillips =

Fiji international rugby league footballer

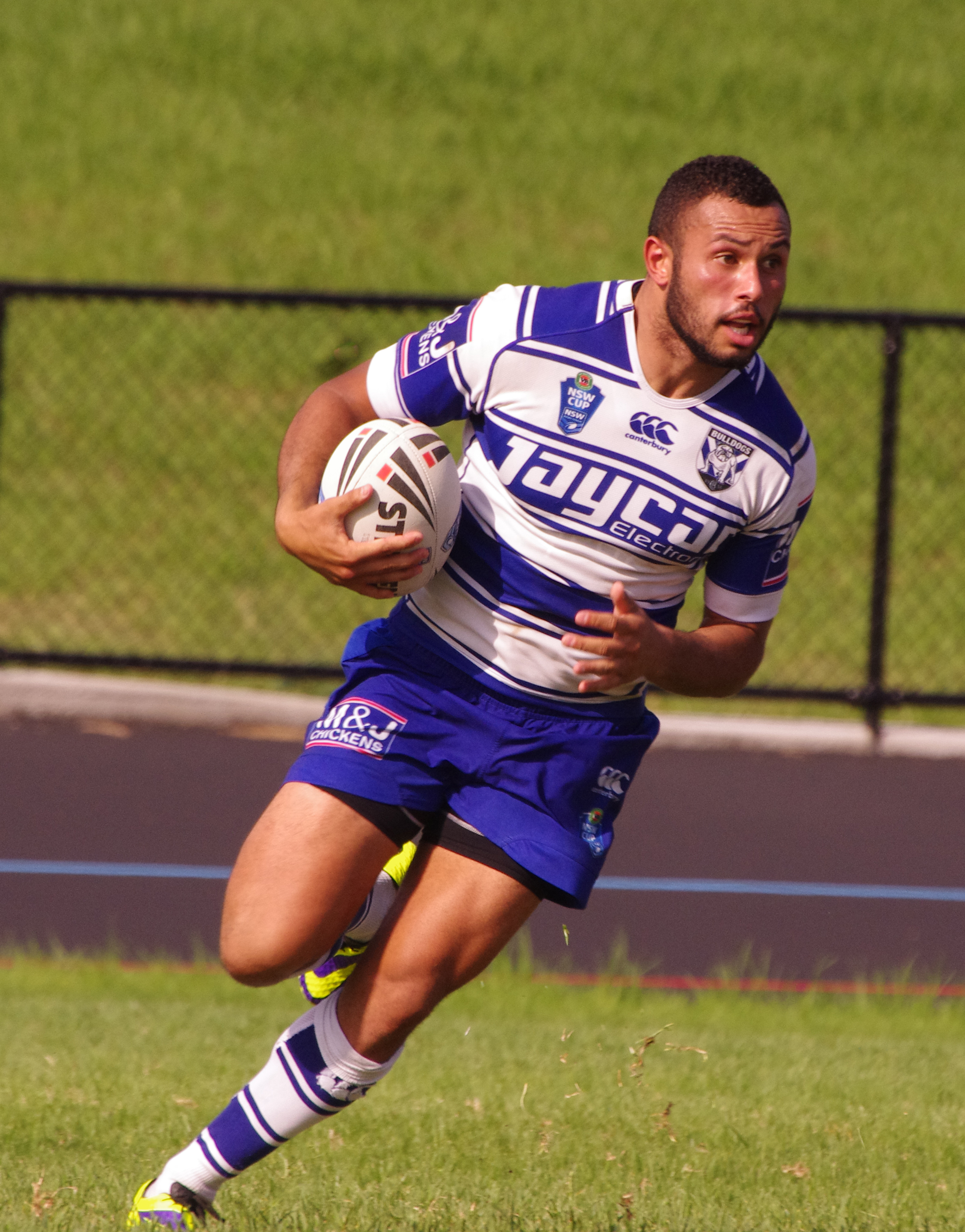

Personal information
- Full name: Tyrone Ranuku Phillips
- Born: 5 January 1994 (age 32) Sydney, New South Wales, Australia
- Height: 184 cm (6 ft 0 in)
- Weight: 93 kg (14 st 9 lb)

Playing information
- Position: Fullback, Centre, Wing
Club
Years	Team	Pld	T	G	FG	P
2015–16	Canterbury Bulldogs	6	4	0	0	16
2018–19	Penrith Panthers	9	4	0	0	16
	Total	15	8	0	0	32
Representative
Years	Team	Pld	T	G	FG	P
2015–18	Fiji	4	2	0	0	8
- Source: As of 26 December 2018

Tyrone Phillips (born 5 January 1994) is a Fiji international rugby league footballer who plays as a fullback, centre and winger

== Background ==
Phillips was born in Sydney, New South Wales, Australia. He is of Fijian and Indigenous Australian descent.

He played his junior rugby league for La Perouse United. He was then signed by the South Sydney Rabbitohs.

== Playing career ==
=== Early career ===
From 2011 to 2013, Phillips played for the South Sydney Rabbitohs' NYC team, scoring 24 tries in 46 matches. In November 2013, he signed a two-year contract with the Canterbury-Bankstown Bulldogs starting in 2014. He played for Canterbury's NYC team in early 2014, before moving on to the Bulldogs' New South Wales Cup team in the same year. On 3 May 2014, he played for the New South Wales under-20s team against the Queensland under-20s team.

=== 2015 ===
On 2 May, Phillips played for Fiji against Papua New Guinea in the 2015 Melanesian Cup, making his international debut off the interchange bench in Fiji's 22-10 win at Cbus Super Stadium. In Round 11 of the 2015 NRL season, he made his NRL debut for the Canterbury club against Canberra. On 27 September, he was named on the wing in the 2015 New South Wales Cup Team of the Year. On 3 November, he re-signed with the Canterbury club on a two-year contract.

=== 2017 ===
On 9 November 2017, Phillips signed a one-year contract with the Penrith Panthers for the 2018 season.

=== 2018 ===
In round 9 of the 2018 NRL season against the North Queensland Cowboys, Phillips made his debut for the Penrith side, starting on the wing and scored two tries in the clubs 20-26 loss at Carrington Park at Bathurst.

=== 2019 ===
In February, Phillips and fellow Penrith player Liam Coleman were named alongside Tyrone May as the people involved in lewd videos filmed showing themselves having sex with an unidentified female. May was stood down by the NRL after the videos became public but Phillips and Coleman were allowed to continue playing.

On 31 March, Phillips was charged with a mid-range drink-driving offence. The matter was then referred to the NRL integrity unit. On 1 April he resigned from the Penrith club.

On 30 June, Phillips was a late inclusion for Canterbury Cup NSW club Newtown in their Round 15 clash against former team, the Canterbury-Bankstown Bulldogs. Phillips scored a try in the match which was won by Canterbury-Bankstown 40-28 at ANZ Stadium.

Phillips played for Newtown in their Canterbury Cup NSW grand final victory over the Wentworthville Magpies at Bankwest Stadium. Phillips was involved in the lead up play for the match winning try which was scored in the 88th minute during extra-time.

=== 2023 ===
In 2023, Phillips played for Glebe in the Ron Massey Cup.
