= George Fai =

Australian rugby league footballer

Personal information
- Born: 18 October 1996 (age 29) Logan City, Queensland, Australia
- Height: 187 cm (6 ft 2 in)
- Weight: 111 kg (17 st 7 lb)

Playing information
- Position: Prop
Club
Years	Team	Pld	T	G	FG	P
2017–18	Brisbane Broncos	3	0	0	0	0
Representative
Years	Team	Pld	T	G	FG	P
2017	Queensland Residents	1	0	0	0	0
- Source: As of 27 April 2026

George Fai (born 18 October 1996) is a retired Australian professional rugby league footballer who played as a prop forward for the Brisbane Broncos in the NRL.

== Background ==
Fai was born in Logan City, Queensland, Australia.

== Career ==
He appeared for the Brisbane Broncos in the defeat by the Warrington Wolves in the 2017 World Club Series.

On 27 May 2017 Rd 12, Fai made his NRL debut for Brisbane against the New Zealand Warriors.

In 2024 Fai won both the Queensland Cup and the NRL State Championship playing for the Norths Devils. On 11 October, Fai had announced his retirement from the sport.
