= Cyril Connell Challenge =

Rugby tournament in Queensland, Australia

- Sport: Rugby league
- Instituted: 2009
- Inaugural season: 2009
- Ceased: 2017
- Number of teams: 16
- Country: Australia
- Most titles: Norths Devils (3 titles)
- Website: www.QRL.com.au
- Related competition: Harold Matthews Cup

The Cyril Connell Challenge is an under-16 competition administered by the Queensland Rugby League in Australia. The competition was named after Cyril Connell Jr., who played 24 games for Queensland and 2 Tests for Australia. The tournament mainly features players from Queensland but from time to time, also teams from Victorian the Northern Territory.

== History ==
First run in 2021, the competition replaced the QRL Junior State Championships, which ran from 2017 to 2020. Originally known as The Cyril Connell Cup the competition, which began in 2009, included the junior representative teams of Queensland Cup clubs. The competition also featured teams from Victoria and the Northern Territory.

In the 2016 season, the Cyril Connell Cup consisted of sixteen clubs: fifteen based within Queensland and one in Victoria. Eleven of the sixteen clubs were junior representative teams for Queensland Cup clubs. From 2011 to 2016, the winners of the Grand Final played the winners of the New South Wales’ under-16 competition, the Harold Matthews Cup, in the National Final.

The 2020 competition was ultimately cancelled in the wake of the COVID pandemic before the tournament re-commenced in a round robin format for the 2021 season.

The Cyril Connell Cup/Challenge was named after Cyril Connell Jr., who played 24 games for Queensland and 2 Tests for Australia between 1952 and 1957.

== Teams ==
In 2021 The Cyril Connell Challenge comprised 15 teams from across the state split into 3 pools. Thirteen of the fifteen clubs were junior representative teams for Queensland Cup clubs. Tweed Heads Seagulls and Redcliffe Dolphins finished equal top of the ladder after going undefeated during their campaigns. Redcliffe would remain undefeated, topping the table in both the 2022 and 2023 editions of the tournament.

=== Clubs ===
Mal Meninga Cup
Club	Seasons	City	Stadium	Premierships (Last)
Central Crows	2011–2016	Bundaberg, Queensland	Across the Waves Sportsground	0
Central Queensland Capras	2009–2016	Rockhampton, Queensland	Browne Park	0
Easts Tigers	2009–2016	Brisbane, Queensland	Suzuki Stadium	0
Gold Coast Blue	2010	Gold Coast, Queensland	Merv Craig Sporting Complex	0
Gold Coast Gold	2011–2012	Gold Coast, Queensland	Pizzey Park	0
Gold Coast Green	2010–2016	Gold Coast, Queensland	Pizzey Park	0
Gold Coast Vikings	2009	Gold Coast, Queensland	Pizzey Park	0
Gold Coast White	2013–2016	Gold Coast, Queensland	Pizzey Park	0
Ipswich Jets	2009–2016	Ipswich, Queensland	North Ipswich Reserve	0
Mackay Cutters	2009–2016	Mackay, Queensland	BB Print Stadium Mackay	0
Northern Pride	2009–2016	Cairns, Queensland	Barlow Park	1 (2014)
Northern Territory Rugby League	2009–2010	Darwin, Northern Territory	Richardson Park	1 (2011)
Norths Devils	2009–2016	Brisbane, Queensland	Bishop Park	3 (2013)
Redcliffe Dolphins	2009–2016	Redcliffe, Queensland	Dolphin Oval	0
Souths Logan Magpies	2009–2016	Brisbane, Queensland	Davies Park	1 (2012)
Sunshine Coast Falcons	2009–2016	Sunshine Coast, Queensland	Sunshine Coast Stadium	0
Toowoomba Clydesdales	2009–2016	Toowoomba, Queensland	Gold Park	0
Townsville Blackhawks	2009–2016	Townsville, Queensland	Jack Manski Oval	2 (2016)
Victoria Rugby League	2015–2016	Melbourne, Victoria	Casey Fields	0
Wests Panthers	2011–2012	Brisbane, Queensland	Purtell Park	0
Wide Bay Bulls	2009	Bundaberg, Queensland	-	0
Wynnum Manly Seagulls	2009–2016	Brisbane, Queensland	BMD Kougari Oval	0
Central Crows played as Central United from 2011 to 2013.; CQ Capras played as Central Comets from 2009 to 2011.; Townsville Blackhawks played as Townsville Stingers from 2009 to 2015.; Western Mustangs played as Toowoomba Clydesdales from 2009 to 2016.

== Grand Final results ==
Season	Grand Finals
Season	Premiers	Score	Runners-up	Venue
2009	Norths Devils	42–30	Townsville Stingers	Bishop Park
2010	Norths Devils	26–24	Gold Coast Blue	Langlands Park
2011	Easts Tigers	28–10	Central Comets	Langlands Park
2012	Souths Logan Magpies	10–6	Townsville Stingers	BMD Kougari Oval
2013	Norths Devils	44–6	Easts Tigers	Langlands Park
2014	Northern Pride	14–12	Townsville Stingers	Barlow Park
2015	Townsville Stingers	31–30	Sunshine Coast Falcons	Tapout Energy Stadium
2016	Townsville Blackhawks	20–18	Souths Logan Magpies	Suzuki Stadium
2023
2024
2025
2026

== See also ==
- Rugby League Competitions in Australia
