= 2027 North Queensland Cowboys season =

Season of rugby league team

Team information
- CEO: Micheal Luck
- Coach: Todd Payten
- Captain: Reuben Cotter Tom Dearden
- Stadium: Queensland Country Bank Stadium
← 2026	2028 →

The 2027 North Queensland Cowboys season will be the 33rd in the club's history. Coached by Todd Payten and captained by Reuben Cotter and Tom Dearden, they will compete in the NRL's 2027 Telstra Premiership.

The club will play their first regular season game against a Western Australian side since 1997 when they play the Perth Bears in Perth in Round 9.

== Season summary ==
=== Squad ===
North Queensland Cowboys 2027 squad
Top 30 squad – 2027 NRL season			Development list	Coaching staff
Braidon Burns – WG; Joe Chan – SR; Tom Chester – CE; Jake Clifford – FE; Reuben Cotter (c) – LK; Tom Dearden (c) – HB; Robert Derby – WG; Coen Hess – PR; Sione Katoa – WG	Ethan King – FB, CE; Mason Kira – LK; Kaiden Lahrs – PR; Zac Laybutt – CE; Soni Luke – HK; Heilum Luki – SR; Reed Mahoney – HK; Thomas Mikaele – PR; Jeremiah Nanai – SR	Griffin Neame – PR; Ronald Philitoga – WG; Jaxon Purdue – FB, CE; Jesse Ramien – CE; Liam Sutton – FE, FE; Jason Taumalolo – PR, LK; James Walsh – CE	Jake Elliott – FE; Xavier Kerrisk – HK; Archie Mesritz – FB; Fanafou Seve – PR; Matthew Watts – PR; Leeroy Weatherall – PR; Extended squad: Braith Dowson – HK; Maddox Goodwin – LK; Taj Lateo – FE; Reweti Ngarimu – SR; Alekisio Siale – PR; Taylan To'a – SR; Tyson Walker – HB; Train and trial: Domenico De Stradis – SR; Mitch Fogarty – HK; Kieran Hayman – FE; Tom McNulty – SR; Eli Morris – FE; Creedence Toia – FB	Head coach: Todd Payten; Assistant coaches: Blake Green; Steve Sheppard; Jordan McLean; Mitchell Dunn; Brett O'Farrell; Legend: (c) Captain(s); (vc) Vice-captain(s); Supplementary list; Extended squad; Train and trial; Updated: 20 November 2026; Source(s): NQ Cowboys

== Squad movement ==
=== Gains ===
Player	Signed from	Until end of	Notes
Joe Chan	Melbourne Storm	2028	
Jake Elliott	Sydney Roosters	2027	
Sione Katoa	Cronulla-Sutherland Sharks	2028	
Jesse Ramien	Cronulla-Sutherland Sharks	2028	
Leeroy Weatherall	St George Illawarra Dragons	2027	

=== Losses ===
Player	Signed to	Until end of	Notes
John Bateman	Bradford Bulls	2028	
Mason Barber	Perth Bears	2029	
Scott Drinkwater	St. George Illawarra Dragons	2029	
Wiremu Greig	Leeds Rhinos	2027	
Zac Herdegen	Perth Bears	2027	
Sam McIntyre	New Zealand Warriors	2028	
Kai O'Donnell	Leigh Leopards	2028	
Jaxson Paulo	Released	–	
Murray Taulagi	RC Vannes	2028	
Viliami Vailea	Kintetsu Liners	2027	

== Ladder ==
Template:NRL2027Ladder

== Fixtures ==
=== Pre-season ===
Date	Round	Opponent	Venue	Score	Tries	Goals	Attendance
Saturday 13 February	Trial 1	Dolphins	Kayo Stadium				
Sunday 21 February	Trial 2	Brisbane Broncos	BB Print Stadium				
Legend: Win Loss Draw Bye

=== Regular season ===
==== Matches ====
Date	Round	Opponent	Venue	Score	Tries	Goals	Attendance
Friday 5 March	Round 1	St George Illawarra Dragons	Jubilee Stadium				
Sunday 14 March	Round 2	Gold Coast Titans	QCB Stadium				
Friday 19 March	Round 3	Brisbane Broncos	Suncorp Stadium				
Saturday 27 March	Round 4	New Zealand Warriors	QCB Stadium				
Sunday 4 April	Round 5	Canberra Raiders	QCB Stadium				
Saturday 10 April	Round 6	Canterbury-Bankstown Bulldogs	Accor Stadium				
Friday 16 April	Round 7	Newcastle Knights	QCB Stadium				
Saturday 24 April	Round 8	Wests Tigers	QCB Stadium				
Sunday 2 May	Round 9	Perth Bears	HBF Park				
Sunday 9 May	Round 10	Parramatta Eels	QCB Stadium				
Saturday 15 May	Round 11	South Sydney Rabbitohs	Suncorp Stadium				
	Round 12	Bye					
Saturday 29 May	Round 13	Penrith Panthers	QCB Stadium				
Sunday 6 June	Round 14	Dolphins	Suncorp Stadium				
	Round 15	Bye					
Saturday 19 June	Round 16	Cronulla-Sutherland Sharks	QCB Stadium				
Friday 25 June	Round 17	Wests Tigers	Campbelltown Stadium				
Saturday 3 July	Round 18	St George Illawarra Dragons	QCB Stadium				
Friday 9 July	Round 19	Melbourne Storm	AAMI Park				
	Round 20	Bye					
Saturday 24 JUly	Round 21	Gold Coast Titans	Cbus Super Stadium				
Saturday 31 July	Round 22	Brisbane Broncos	QCB Stadium				
Saturday 8 August	Round 23	Manly Warringah Sea Eagles	4 Pines Park				
Saturday 14 August	Round 24	Dolphins	QCB Stadium				
Friday 20 August	Round 25	Canberra Raiders	GIO Stadium				
Saturday 28 August	Round 26	Sydney Roosters	QCB Stadium				
Saturday 4 September	Round 27	Newcastle Knights	McDonald Jones Stadium				
Legend: Win Loss Draw Bye

== Representatives ==
The following players played a representative match in 2027.

== Feeder clubs ==
=== Queensland Cup ===
- Mackay Cutters
- Northern Pride
- Townsville Blackhawks
