= 2026 North Queensland Cowboys season =

Season of rugby league team

- NRL Rank: 8th
- Play-off result: Lost Elimination Final (v Cronulla Sharks, 16–26)
- 2026 record: Wins: 13; draws: 0; losses: 11
- Points scored: For: 568; against: 652

Team information
- CEO: Micheal Luck
- Coach: Todd Payten
- Captain: Reuben Cotter Tom Dearden
- Stadium: Queensland Country Bank Stadium
- Avg. attendance: 19,415
- High attendance: 25,461 (vs. Brisbane, Rd 21)

Top scorers
- Tries: Braidon Burns (16)
- Goals: Jake Clifford (53)
- Points: Jake Clifford (144)
← 2025	2027 →

The 2026 North Queensland Cowboys season was the 32nd in the club's history. Coached by Todd Payten and captained by Reuben Cotter and Tom Dearden, they competed in the NRL's 2026 Telstra Premiership.

The club played its first game in the United States in 2026 with their Round 1 fixture against the Newcastle Knights in Las Vegas. They finished 8th, returning to the finals, but were eliminated by the Cronulla-Sutherland Sharks.

== Season summary ==
=== Milestones ===
- Round 1: Reed Mahoney and Matthew Lodge made their debuts for the club.
- Round 2: Soni Luke made his debut for the club.
- Round 6: Scott Drinkwater played his 150th NRL game.
- Round 6: Soni Luke scored his first try for the club.
- Round 7: Scott Drinkwater played his 150th NRL game for the club.
- Round 8: Reed Mahoney scored his first try for the club.
- Round 10: Jason Taumalolo played his 295th NRL game for the club, overtaking Johnathan Thurston as the club's most capped player.
- Round 11: Liam Sutton made his NRL debut.
- Round 11: Wiremu Greig made his debut for the club.
- Round 11: Griffin Neame played his 100th NRL game for the club.
- Round 11: Jake Clifford played his 100th NRL game.
- Round 12: Xavier Kerrisk made his NRL debut.
- Round 12: Liam Sutton scored his first NRL try.
- Round 13: Ethan King made his debut for the club.
- Round 13: Thomas Mikaele played his 100th NRL game.
- Round 14: Coen Hess played his 200th NRL game for the club.
- Round 17: Jason Taumalolo played his 300th NRL game for the club, becoming the first player to do so.
- Round 20: Jeremiah Nanai scored his 50th NRL try.
- Finals Week 1: Braidon Burns played his 100th NRL game.

=== Squad ===
North Queensland Cowboys 2026 squad
Top 30 squad – 2026 NRL season			Supplementary list	Coaching staff
John Bateman – SR; Braidon Burns – WG; Tom Chester – CE; Jake Clifford – FE; Reuben Cotter (c) – LK; Tom Dearden (c) – HB; Robert Derby – WG; Scott Drinkwater – FB; Zac Herdegen – HB, HK; Coen Hess – PR	Ethan King – FB, CE; Mason Kira – SR; Kaiden Lahrs – PR; Zac Laybutt – CE; Soni Luke – HK; Heilum Luki – SR; Reed Mahoney – HK; Sam McIntyre – SR; Thomas Mikaele – PR; Jeremiah Nanai – SR	Griffin Neame – PR; Kai O'Donnell – SR; Jaxson Paulo – WG; Jaxon Purdue – CE; Murray Taulagi – WG; Jason Taumalolo – PR; Viliami Vailea – CE; James Walsh – CE, SR	Mason Barber – FB; Xavier Kerrisk – HK; Ronald Philitoga – WG; Liam Sutton – CE; Matthew Watts – PR; Extended squad: Wiremu Greig – PR; Taj Lateo – FE; Archie Mesritz – FB; Taylan To'a – SR; Tyson Walker – HB	Head coach: Todd Payten; Assistant coaches: Paul Wellens; Blake Green; Brett O'Farrell; Legend: (c) Captain(s); (vc) Vice-captain(s); Supplementary list; Extended squad; Train and trial; Updated: 19 October 2026; Source(s): NQ Cowboys

== Squad movement ==
=== Gains ===
Player	Signed from	Until end of	Notes
Ethan King	Sydney Roosters	2027	
Matthew Lodge	Manly Sea Eagles	2026	
Reed Mahoney	Canterbury Bulldogs	2028	
Ronald Philitoga	Wynnum Manly Seagulls	2026	
Liam Sutton	Wynnum Manly Seagulls	2026	
James Walsh	Dolphins	2028	

=== Losses ===
Player	Signed to	Until end of	Notes
Marly Bitungane	London Broncos	2026	
Tom Duffy	Brisbane Broncos	2026	
Harrison Edwards	Parramatta Eels (mid-season)	2026	
Temple Kalepo	Wynnum Manly Seagulls	2026	
Nic Lenaz	Townsville Blackhawks	2026	
Matthew Lodge	Leeds Rhinos (mid-season)	2026	
Jeremiah Mata'utia	Leeds Rhinos	2026	
Jordan McLean	Retired	–	
Reece Robson	Sydney Roosters	2029	
Jamal Shibasaki	Wynnum Manly Seagulls	2026	
Semi Valemei	Castleford Tigers	2027	

=== Re-signings ===
Player	Until End of	Notes
Braidon Burns	2028	
Tom Chester	2029	
Jake Clifford	2028	
Kaiden Lahrs	2027	
Soni Luke	2026	
Thomas Mikaele	2028	
Jaxon Purdue	2030	

== Ladder ==
Pos	Team	Pld	W	D	L	B	PF	PA	PD	Pts	Qualification
1	Penrith Panthers	24	18	0	6	3	683	347	+336	42	Advance to finals series
2	New Zealand Warriors	24	18	0	6	3	728	418	+310	42	Advance to finals series
3	Dolphins	24	17	0	7	3	662	506	+156	40	Advance to finals series
4	Sydney Roosters (P)	24	16	0	8	3	619	501	+118	38	Advance to finals series
5	Cronulla-Sutherland Sharks	24	14	0	10	3	672	523	+149	34	Advance to finals series
6	South Sydney Rabbitohs	24	14	0	10	3	694	581	+113	34	Advance to finals series
7	Newcastle Knights	24	14	0	10	3	633	591	+42	34	Advance to finals series
8	North Queensland Cowboys	24	13	0	11	3	568	652	−84	32	Advance to finals series
9	Manly Warringah Sea Eagles	24	11	0	13	3	623	524	+99	28	
10	Melbourne Storm	24	11	0	13	3	594	576	+18	28	
11	Canberra Raiders	24	11	0	13	3	581	626	−45	28	
12	Canterbury-Bankstown Bulldogs	24	11	0	13	3	476	536	−60	28	
13	Parramatta Eels	24	9	0	15	3	497	678	−181	24	
14	Brisbane Broncos	24	8	0	16	3	471	677	−206	22	
15	Wests Tigers	24	8	0	16	3	445	699	−254	22	
16	Gold Coast Titans	24	6	0	18	3	477	663	−186	18	
17	St. George Illawarra Dragons	24	5	0	19	3	392	717	−325	16	

Source: National Rugby League
Rules for classification: 1) competition points; 2) points differential; 3) percentage; (Note: Greater percentage of points scored for and against, being determined by points scored for divided by points scored against expressed as a percentage.) 4) tries scored; (Note: Further tiebreakers (in order) include goals scored, field goals kicked; least amount of penalties conceded.)
(P) Premiers

== Fixtures ==
=== Pre-season ===
Date	Round	Opponent	Venue	Score	Tries	Goals	Attendance
Saturday, 7 February	Trial 1	Canterbury-Bankstown Bulldogs	Jubilee Oval	34 – 30	Derby (2), Barber, Laybutt, Luki, O'Donnell	Clifford (4/5), Sutton (1/1)	3,926
Friday, 13 February	Trial 2	Penrith Panthers	BB Print Stadium	66 – 24	O'Donnell (3), Burns (2), Clifford (2), Drinkwater, Luki, Mikaele, Purdue, Taulagi	Drinkwater (6/8), Clifford (2/3), Sutton (1/1)	
Legend: Win Loss Draw Bye

=== Regular season ===
==== Matches ====
Date	Round	Opponent	Venue	Score	Tries	Goals	Attendance
Saturday, February 28	Round 1	Newcastle Knights	Allegiant Stadium	18 – 28	Luki, Taulagi	Clifford (3/3)	45,719
Saturday, 14 March	Round 2	Wests Tigers	Leichhardt Oval	16 – 44	Burns, Chester, Purdue	Clifford (1/3)	17,367
Sunday, 22 March	Round 3	Gold Coast Titans	QCB Stadium	30 – 16	Taulagi (2), Clifford, Drinkwater, Purdue	Clifford (5/6)	16,999
Saturday, 28 March	Round 4	Melbourne Storm	QCB Stadium	28 – 24	Burns (2), Clifford, Luki, McIntyre, Taulagi	Clifford (1/4), Drinkwater (1/2)	20,931
Saturday, 4 April	Round 5	St George Illawarra Dragons	Jubilee Oval	32 – 0	Drinkwater, Purdue (2), Burns, Taulagi, Clifford	Clifford (4/6)	8,491
Friday, 10 April	Round 6	Brisbane Broncos	Suncorp Stadium	35 – 31	Purdue, Laybutt, Luke, Drinkwater, Chester, Luki	Clifford (5/6), Drinkwater (FG)	45,582
Thursday, 16 April	Round 7	Manly Warringah Sea Eagles	QCB Stadium	6 – 38	Hess	Clifford	17,476
Friday, 24 April	Round 8	Cronulla-Sutherland Sharks	QCB Stadium	46 – 34	Drinkwater, Taulagi (3), Mahoney, Burns, Luke, Dearden, Luki	Clifford (5/9)	17,886
Friday, 1 May	Round 9	Canterbury-Bankstown Bulldogs	Accor Stadium	38 – 12	Drinkwater, Burns, Clifford, Cotter	Clifford (4/5)	15,132
Friday, 8 May	Round 10	Parramatta Eels	QCB Stadium	30 – 33	Chester, Clifford, Luki, Mahoney, Purdue	Clifford (5/5)	17,626
Sunday, 16 May	Round 11	Sydney Roosters	Suncorp Stadium	18 – 12	Burns (2), Drinkwater	Clifford (3/3)	49,601
Sunday, 24 May	Round 12	South Sydney Rabbitohs	QCB Stadium	30 – 18	Chester, Laybutt, Luki, Mahoney, Sutton	Clifford (4/5, 2PT FG)	18,888
Sunday, 31 May	Round 13	Canberra Raiders	GIO Stadium	26 – 12	Luki, Sutton	Clifford (2/2)	12,258
Saturday, 6 June	Round 14	Dolphins	QCB Stadium	14 – 40	Chester (2), Taulagi	Clifford (1/3)	21,911
	Round 15	Bye					
Sunday, 21 June	Round 16	New Zealand Warriors	One NZ Stadium	20 – 38	Burns (2), Drinkwater, Nanai	Clifford (2/4)	24,365
Saturday, 27 June	Round 17	Penrith Panthers	QCB Stadium	26 – 12	Nanai (2), Clifford, Nanai	Clifford (5/7)	22,888
	Round 18	Bye					
Sunday, 12 July	Round 19	Manly Warringah Sea Eagles	4 Pines Park	19 – 18	Burns (2), Chester, Cotter	Clifford (1/4), Drinkwater (FG)	16,892
Sunday, 19 July	Round 20	Dolphins	Suncorp Stadium	36 – 16	Dearden, Drinkwater, Nanai	Drinkwater (2/3)	35,213
Saturday, 25 July	Round 21	Brisbane Broncos	QCB Stadium	18 – 10	Clifford, Luki	Drinkwater (5/5)	25,461
Thursday, 30 July	Round 22	Sydney Roosters	QCB Stadium	12 – 82	Burns, Chester	Drinkwater (2/2)	15,835
Thursday, 6 August	Round 23	Gold Coast Titans	Cbus Super Stadium	30 – 8	Luki, Clifford, Purdue, Taumalolo	Drinkwater (5/5)	11,740
Saturday, 15 August	Round 24	Parramatta Eels	CommBank Stadium	30 – 32	Mahoney, Burns, Purdue, Cotter, Tom Chester	Drinkwater (5/5)	12,804
	Round 25	Bye					
Saturday, 29 August	Round 26	Wests Tigers	QCB Stadium	24 – 10	Chester (2), Luki, Purdue	Drinkwater (4/5)	17,888
Saturday, 5 September	Round 27	Canberra Raiders	QCB Stadium	30 – 50	Bateman, Burns, Clifford, Drinkwater, Taumalolo	Drinkwater (5/5)	18,982
Legend: Win Loss Draw Bye

=== Finals ===
Date	Round	Opponent	Venue	Score	Tries	Goals	Attendance
Friday, 20 September	Elimination	Cronulla-Sutherland Sharks	Allianz Stadium	16 – 26	Burns, Laybutt, Purdue	Drinkwater (2/3)	17,429
Legend: Win Loss Draw

== Statistics ==
Name	App	T	G	FG	Pts
John Bateman	7	1	–	–	4
Braidon Burns	21	16	–	–	64
Tom Chester	24	11	–	–	44
Jake Clifford	24	9	53	1	144
Reuben Cotter	22	3	–	–	12
Tom Dearden	14	2	–	–	8
Robert Derby	2	–	–	–	–
Scott Drinkwater	25	10	31	2	104
Harrison Edwards	1	–	–	–	–
Wiremu Greig	3	–	–	–	–
Coen Hess	25	1	–	–	4
Xavier Kerrisk	1	–	–	–	–
Ethan King	5	–	–	–	–
Kaiden Lahrs	2	–	–	–	–
Zac Laybutt	20	3	–	–	12
Matthew Lodge	15	–	–	–	–
Soni Luke	19	2	–	–	8
Heilum Luki	25	11	–	–	44
Reed Mahoney	22	4	–	–	16
Sam McIntyre	16	1	–	–	4
Thomas Mikaele	21	–	–	–	–
Jeremiah Nanai	10	4	–	–	16
Griffin Neame	23	–	–	–	–
Kai O'Donnell	7	–	–	–	–
Jaxon Purdue	25	10	–	–	40
Liam Sutton	4	2	–	–	8
Murray Taulagi	17	11	–	–	44
Jason Taumalolo	24	2	–	–	8
Totals		103	84	3	584

== Representatives ==
The following players played a representative match in 2026.

	All Stars match	State of Origin 1	State of Origin 2	State of Origin 3	Prime Minister's XIII	World Cup
Braidon Burns					Australia	
Tom Chester					Australia	
Reuben Cotter		Queensland	Queensland	Queensland		Australia
Tom Dearden						Australia
Robert Derby						Papua New Guinea
Kaiden Lahrs	Indigenous All Stars					
Zac Laybutt						Papua New Guinea
Soni Luke						Tonga
Jeremiah Nanai				Queensland		
Ronald Philitoga						Fiji
Jaxon Purdue					Australia	
Jason Taumalolo						Tonga

== Honours ==
=== Club ===
- Paul Bowman Medal: Reuben Cotter
- Players' Player: Scott Drinkwater
- Cowboys Way Award: Soni Luke
- Rookie of the Year: Liam Sutton
- JCU Education Award: Xavier Kerrisk
- Affiliate Player of the Year: Ethan King
- Club Person of the Year: Mark Taviani
- Member's Player of the Year: Tom Chester
- Townsville Bulletin Fan Award: Tom Chester

== Feeder clubs ==
=== Queensland Cup ===
- Mackay Cutters – 7th, lost elimination final
- Northern Pride – 10th, missed finals
- Townsville Blackhawks – 5th, lost semi final
