= 2023 North Queensland Cowboys season =

Season of rugby league team

- NRL Rank: 11th
- Play-off result: Missed finals
- 2023 record: Wins: 12; draws: 0; losses: 12
- Points scored: For: 546; against: 542

Team information
- CEO: Jeff Reibel
- Coach: Todd Payten
- Captain: Jason Taumalolo Chad Townsend
- Stadium: Queensland Country Bank Stadium
- Avg. attendance: 19,175
- High attendance: 22,811 (vs. Dolphins Round 6)

Top scorers
- Tries: Kyle Feldt (13)
- Goals: Valentine Holmes (68)
- Points: Valentine Holmes (170)
← 2022	2024 →

The 2023 North Queensland Cowboys season was the 29th in the club's history. Coached by Todd Payten and captained by Jason Taumalolo and Chad Townsend, they competed in the NRL's 2023 Telstra Premiership but did not qualify for the finals.

== Season summary ==
=== Milestones ===
- Round 1: Jamayne Taunoa-Brown played his 50th NRL game.
- Round 3: Tom Chester scored his first NRL try.
- Round 3: Gehamat Shibasaki made his debut for the club.
- Round 5: Riley Price made his NRL debut.
- Round 7: Jack Gosiewski made his debut for the club.
- Round 10: Kulikefu Finefeuiaki made his NRL debut.
- Round 10: Jack Gosiewski scored his first try for the club.
- Round 13: Robert Derby and Zac Laybutt made their NRL debuts.

=== Squad ===
North Queensland Cowboys 2023 squad
Top 30 NRL Squad – 2023 season			Development Players	Coaching Staff
Jake Bourke – FE; Tom Chester – FB; Reuben Cotter – PR, LK; Tom Dearden – FE; Scott Drinkwater – FB; Mitch Dunn – PR; Brendan Elliot – WG; Kyle Feldt – WG; Jack Gosiewski – SR; Jake Granville – LK, PR	Ben Hampton – FE; Coen Hess – SR, PR; Peta Hiku – CE; Valentine Holmes – CE; Luciano Leilua – SR; Heilum Luki – SR; Sam McIntyre – SR, LK; Jordan McLean (vc) – PR; Jeremiah Nanai – SR; Griffin Neame – PR, SR	Riley Price – SR, LK, PR; Reece Robson – HK; Taniela Sadrugu – LK, CE; Gehamat Shibasaki – CE; James Tamou – PR; Murray Taulagi – WG; Jason Taumalolo (c) – LK; Jamayne Taunoa-Brown – PR; Chad Townsend (c) – HB; Semi Valemei – CE, WG	Jodeci Baker-Tiraha – FB; Robert Derby – WG; Tom Duffy – HB; Kulikefu Finefeuiaki – SR; Jai Hansen – HK; Ragarive Wavik – CE; Extended squad: Marly Bitungane – PR; Zac Laybutt – CE, FB, FE; Sylvester Namo – PR	Head coach: Todd Payten; Assistant coaches: Dean Young; Steve Georgallis; Ben Rauter (Development); Paul Bowman (Head of Performance); Ashley Graham (Strength & Conditioning); Mark Henry (Strength & Conditioning); James Moran (Strength & Conditioning); Steve Sartori (Physiotherapist); Legend: (c) Captain(s); (vc) Vice-captain(s); Development players; Extended squad; Updated: 9 May 2023; Source(s): NQ Cowboys

== Squad movement ==
=== Gains ===
Player	Signed from	Until end of	Notes
Jack Gosiewski	St George Illawarra Dragons	2023	
Sam McIntyre	Gold Coast Titans (mid-season)	2024	
James Tamou	Wests Tigers	2023	
Semi Valemei	Canberra Raiders (mid-season)	2025	

=== Losses ===
Player	Signed to	Until end of	Notes
Iosefo Baleiwairiki	Fijian Drua	2023	
Kane Bradley	Brisbane Tigers	2023	
Brendan Frei	Wynnum Manly Seagulls	2023	
Tom Gilbert	Dolphins	2025	
Connelly Lemuelu	Dolphins	2024	
Jordan Lipp	Western Clydesdales (mid-season)	2023	
Morgan McWhirter	North Sydney Bears	2023	
Laitia Moceidreke	Newcastle Knights (mid-season)	2023	
Emry Pere	Burleigh Bears	2023	
Hamiso Tabuai-Fidow	Dolphins	2024	
Tyreece Woods	Newcastle Knights	2023	

=== Re-signings ===
Player	Signed from	Until end of	Notes
Jeremiah Nanai	North Queensland Cowboys	2027	

== Ladder ==
2023 NRL season
Pos	Team	Pld	W	D	L	B	PF	PA	PD	Pts
1	Penrith Panthers (P)	24	18	0	6	3	645	312	+333	42
2	Brisbane Broncos	24	18	0	6	3	639	425	+214	42
3	Melbourne Storm	24	16	0	8	3	627	459	+168	38
4	New Zealand Warriors	24	16	0	8	3	572	448	+124	38
5	Newcastle Knights	24	14	1	9	3	626	451	+175	35
6	Cronulla-Sutherland Sharks	24	14	0	10	3	619	497	+122	34
7	Sydney Roosters	24	13	0	11	3	472	496	−24	32
8	Canberra Raiders	24	13	0	11	3	486	623	−137	32
9	South Sydney Rabbitohs	24	12	0	12	3	564	505	+59	30
10	Parramatta Eels	24	12	0	12	3	587	574	+13	30
11	North Queensland Cowboys	24	12	0	12	3	546	542	+4	30
12	Manly Warringah Sea Eagles	24	11	1	12	3	545	539	+6	29
13	Dolphins	24	9	0	15	3	520	631	−111	24
14	Gold Coast Titans	24	9	0	15	3	527	653	−126	24
15	Canterbury-Bankstown Bulldogs	24	7	0	17	3	438	769	−331	20
16	St. George Illawarra Dragons	24	5	0	19	3	474	673	−199	16
17	Wests Tigers	24	4	0	20	3	385	675	−290	14

== Fixtures ==
=== Pre-season ===
Date	Round	Opponent	Venue	Score	Tries	Goals	Attendance
Saturday, 12 February	Trial 1	Dolphins	Barlow Park	22 – 22	Derby (2), Moceidreke (2)	Duffy (3/4), Laybutt (0/1)	6,922
Saturday, 18 February	Trial 2	Brisbane Broncos	Sunshine Coast Stadium	18 - 22	Holmes, Feldt, Nanai	Holmes (3/3)	
Legend: Win Loss Draw Bye

=== Regular season ===
Round	1	2	3	4	5	6	7	8	9	10	11	12	13	14	15	16	17	18	19	20	21	22	23	24	25	26	27
Ground	H	A	H	H	A	H	A	H	A	N	H	A	A	H	–	H	A	H	–	A	H	A	H	–	H	A	A
Result	W	L	L	W	L	L	L	W	L	W	W	L	L	W	B	W	W	W	B	W	W	L	L	B	L	W	L
Position	8	13	15	13	14	15	16	15	16	14	13	14	16	14	14	13	10	9	9	9	7	8	10	9	9	9	11
Points	2	2	2	4	4	4	4	6	6	8	10	10	10	12	14	16	18	20	22	24	26	26	26	28	28	30	30

Source: National Rugby League
A = Away; H = Home; N = Neutral; B = Bye; W = Win; D = Draw; L = Loss

Date	Round	Opponent	Venue	Score	Tries	Goals	Attendance
Saturday, 4 March	Round 1	Canberra Raiders	QCB Stadium	19 - 18	Taulagi, Drinkwater (2)	Holmes (3/5), Townsend (1 FG)	19,855
Friday, 10 March	Round 2	Brisbane Broncos	Suncorp Stadium	16 - 28	Nanai (2)	Holmes (4/4)	43,162
Saturday, 18 March	Round 3	NZ Warriors	QCB Stadium	12 – 26	Chester, Robson	Holmes (2/2)	17,818
Saturday, 25 March	Round 4	Gold Coast Titans	QCB Stadium	24 – 12	Chester, Holmes, Nanai, Tamou	Holmes (4/4)	16,426
Sunday, 2 April	Round 5	Canterbury Bulldogs	Accor Stadium	14 – 15	Chester, Dearden	Holmes (3/4)	9,626
Friday, 7 April	Round 6	Dolphins	QCB Stadium	22 – 32	Feldt (2), Hess, Holmes	Holmes (3/4)	22,811
Saturday, 15 April	Round 7	NZ Warriors	Mount Smart Stadium	14 – 22	Cotter, Holmes, Taulagi	Holmes (1/3)	23,695
Saturday, 22 April	Round 8	Newcastle Knights	QCB Stadium	18 – 16	Dearden, Feldt, Robson	Holmes (3/3)	17,970
Thursday, 27 April	Round 9	Cronulla Sharks	PointsBet Stadium	6 – 44	Feldt	Holmes (1/1)	8,148
Sunday, 7 May	Round 10	Sydney Roosters	Suncorp Stadium	20 – 6	Cotter, Gosiewski, Townsend	Holmes (4/4)	45,085
Saturday, 13 May	Round 11	St George Illawarra Dragons	QCB Stadium	46 – 26	Feldt (2), Gosiewski, Luki (2), Dearden (2)	Holmes (6/7, 1 2pt FG)	17,852
Saturday, 20 May	Round 12	Wests Tigers	Leichhardt Oval	18 – 66	Cotter, Feldt, Leilua	Holmes (3/3)	12,247
Friday, 26 May	Round 13	Parramatta Eels	CommBank Stadium	16 – 24	Feldt (2), Drinkwater	Townsend (2/3)	14,810
Sunday, 4 June	Round 14	Melbourne Storm	QCB Stadium	45 – 20	Valemei (3), Holmes, Taulagi (2), Nanai, Townsend	Holmes (6/8), Townsend (1 FG)	18,867
	Round 15	Bye					
Friday, 16 June	Round 16	Penrith Panthers	QCB Stadium	27 – 23	Drinkwater (2), Dearden, Finefeuiaki, Feldt	Townsend (3/4, 1 FG)	17,277
Sunday, 25 June	Round 17	South Sydney Rabbitohs	Accor Stadium	31 – 6	Taulagi, Holmes (2), Finefeuiaki, Dearden	Drinkwater (1 FG), Holmes (5/6)	11,262
Saturday, 1 July	Round 18	Wests Tigers	QCB Stadium	74 – 0	Taulagi (3), Drinkwater (2), Holmes (2), Valemei (2), Dearden, Leilua, McLean, Nanai	Holmes (11/13)	30,606
	Round 19	Bye					
Saturday, 15 July	Round 20	Manly Sea Eagles	4 Pines Park	19 – 8	Cotter, Nanai, Drinkwater	Holmes (3/3)	13,240
Saturday, 22 July	Round 21	Parramatta Eels	QCB Stadium	24 - 16	Hiku, Valemei (2), Drinkwater	Holmes (4/5)	20,710
Sunday, 30 July	Round 22	Gold Coast Titans	Cbus Super Stadium	13 – 22	Hess, Valemei	Holmes (2/2), Townsend (1 FG)	16,516
Saturday, 5 August	Round 23	Brisbane Broncos	QCB Stadium	14 – 30	Feldt (2), Luki	Townsend (1/4)	22,659
	Round 24	Bye					
Thursday, 17 August	Round 25	Cronulla Sharks	QCB Stadium	12 – 32	Drinkwater, Valemei	Drinkwater (2/2)	17,318
Friday, 25 August	Round 26	Dolphins	Suncorp Stadium	34 – 10	Laybutt (2), Drinkwater, Feldt, Hiku, Taulagi	Drinkwater (5/6)	33,449
Saturday, 2 September	Round 27	Penrith Panthers	BlueBet Stadium	12 – 44	Laybutt, Neame	Drinkwater (2/2)	21,525
Legend: Win Loss Draw Bye

== Statistics ==
Name	App	T	G	FG	Pts
Tom Chester	7	3	-	-	12
Reuben Cotter	20	4	-	-	16
Tom Dearden	23	7	-	-	28
Robert Derby	1	-	-	-	-
Scott Drinkwater	21	11	9	1	63
Mitchell Dunn	8	–	-	-	-
Brendan Elliot	2	–	-	-	-
Kyle Feldt	18	13	-	-	52
Kulikefu Finefeuiaki	12	2	-	-	8
Jack Gosiewski	7	2	-	-	8
Jake Granville	24	–	-	-	-
Ben Hampton	1	-	-	-	-
Coen Hess	24	2	-	-	8
Peta Hiku	22	2	-	-	8
Valentine Holmes	18	8	68	1	170
Zac Laybutt	4	3	-	-	12
Luciano Leilua	13	2	-	-	8
Heilum Luki	13	3	-	-	12
Sam McIntyre	2	-	-	-	-
Jordan McLean	22	1	-	-	4
Jeremiah Nanai	13	6	-	-	24
Griffin Neame	17	1	-	-	4
Riley Price	2	–	-	-	-
Reece Robson	23	2	-	-	8
Gehamat Shibasaki	2	–	-	-	-
James Tamou	3	1	-	-	4
Murray Taulagi	20	9	-	-	36
Jason Taumalolo	16	–	-	-	-
Jamayne Taunoa-Brown	17	-	-	-	-
Chad Townsend	24	2	6	5	25
Semi Valemei	9	9	-	-	36
Totals		93	87	7	546

== Representatives ==
The following players played a representative match in 2023.

	All Stars match	State of Origin 1	State of Origin 2	State of Origin 3	Prime Minister's XIII
Reuben Cotter		Queensland	Queensland	Queensland	Australia
Robert Derby					Papua New Guinea
Valentine Holmes		Queensland	Queensland	Queensland	
Zac Laybutt					Papua New Guinea
Jeremiah Nanai		Queensland	Queensland	Queensland	
Murray Taulagi		Queensland	Queensland	Queensland	Australia
Reece Robson			New South Wales	New South Wales	Australia
Jamayne Taunoa-Brown	Indigenous All Stars				

== Honours ==
=== Club ===
- Paul Bowman Medal: Scott Drinkwater
- Players' Player: Scott Drinkwater
- The Cowboys Way Award: Jordan McLean
- Rookie of the Year: Kulikefu Finefeuiaki
- JCU Education Award: Reuben Cotter
- Young Guns Cowboys Way Award: Wil Sullivan
- Club Person of the Year: James Tamou
- Fans Choice Player of the Year: Reuben Cotter

== Feeder Clubs ==
=== Queensland Cup ===
While still affiliated with the Cutters and Pride, the Cowboys used the Blackhawks as their sole feeder club for their NRL players in 2023.

- Mackay Cutters – 14th, missed finals
- Northern Pride – 7th, lost elimination final
- Townsville Blackhawks – 12th, missed finals

== Women's team ==
The North Queensland Cowboys Women's team competed in their first season of the NRL Women's Premiership in 2023. They finished 9th, winning two games and losing seven. They were coached by Ben Jeffries and captained by Kirra Dibb and Tallisha Harden.
