= 2022 North Queensland Cowboys season =

Coordinates: 27°27′53″S 153°0′34″E

- NRL Rank: 3rd
- Play-off result: Lost preliminary final
- 2022 record: Wins: 17; draws: 0; losses: 7
- Points scored: For: 685; against: 415

Team information
- CEO: Jeff Reibel
- Coach: Todd Payten
- Captain: Jason Taumalolo Chad Townsend
- Stadium: Queensland Country Bank Stadium
- Avg. attendance: 18,376
- High attendance: 25,372 (vs. Parramatta Eels, prelim final)

Top scorers
- Tries: Jeremiah Nanai; Murray Taulagi (17)
- Goals: Valentine Holmes (100)
- Points: Valentine Holmes (244)
← 2021	2023 →

The 2022 North Queensland Cowboys season was the 28th in the club's history. Coached by Todd Payten and captained by Jason Taumalolo and Chad Townsend, they competed in the NRL's 2022 Telstra Premiership.

The Cowboys returned to the finals after four seasons in the bottom four, finishing one game short of the Grand Final. They finished the regular season in the third position and won 17 games, their equal-highest ever (along with 2015).

== Season summary ==
=== Milestones ===
- Round 1: Peta Hiku, Jamayne Taunoa-Brown and Chad Townsend made their debuts for the club.
- Round 1: Tom Gilbert scored his first NRL try.
- Round 2: Mitchell Dunn played his 50th NRL game for the club.
- Round 3: Reece Robson played his 50th NRL game.
- Round 3: Griffin Neame scored his first NRL try.
- Round 10: Reuben Cotter scored his first NRL try.
- Round 10: Peta Hiku scored his first try for the club.
- Round 11: Tom Dearden played his 50th NRL game.
- Round 13: Brendan Elliot made his debut for the club.
- Round 16: Luciano Leilua made his debut for the club.
- Round 16: Luciano Leilua played his 100th NRL game.
- Round 18: Tom Chester made his NRL debut.
- Round 21: Valentine Holmes played his 50th NRL game for the club.
- Round 21: Luciano Leilua and Chad Townsend scored their first tries for the club.

=== Squad ===
North Queensland Cowboys 2022 squad
Top 30 NRL squad – 2022 season			Development players	Coaching staff
Jake Bourke – FE, HB; Kane Bradley – WG, CE; Ben Condon – PR, SR; Reuben Cotter – LK, PR; Tom Dearden – FE; Scott Drinkwater – FB; Mitch Dunn – LK; Brendan Elliot – WG, FB, CE; Kyle Feldt – WG; Brendan Frei – SR	Tom Gilbert – SR, LK, PR; Jake Granville – HK; Ben Hampton – FE, HB; Coen Hess – PR, LK, SR; Peta Hiku – CE; Valentine Holmes – CE; Luciano Leilua – SR, PR; Connelly Lemuelu – SR, LK; Heilum Luki – SR; Jordan McLean (vc) – PR	Laitia Moceidreke – WG; Jeremiah Nanai – SR; Griffin Neame – PR; Emry Pere – PR; Reece Robson – HK; Hamiso Tabuai-Fidow – FB, CE, WG; Murray Taulagi – WG; Jason Taumalolo (c) – PR, LK; Jamayne Taunoa-Brown – PR; Chad Townsend (c) – HB	Tom Chester – FB; Jordan Lipp – CE, WG; Riley Price – LK, PR; Tyreece Woods – CE, FB; Extended squad: Iosefo Baleiwairiki – WG; Robert Derby – WG; Morgan McWhirter – PR, LK; Taniela Sadrugu – CE, SR; Gehamat Shibasaki – CE, WG	Head coach: Todd Payten; Assistant coaches: Dean Young (Assistant coach); Steve Georgallis (Assistant coach); Ben Rauter (Development coach); Paul Bowman (head of performance); Ashley Graham (Strength & Conditioning coach); Mark Henry (Strength & Conditioning coach); James Moran (Strength & Conditioning coach); Steve Sartori (physiotherapist); Legend: (c) Captain(s); (vc) Vice-captain(s); Development players; Extended squad; Updated: 6 August 2022; Source(s): NQ Cowboys

== Squad movement ==
=== Gains ===
Player	Signed from	Until end of	Notes
Iosefo Baleiwairiki	Fiji Rugby Sevens	2022	
Brendan Elliot	Leigh Centurions	2022	
Brendan Frei	Norths Devils (mid-season)	2022	
Peta Hiku	New Zealand Warriors	2023	
Luciano Leilua	Wests Tigers (mid-season)	2025	
Taniela Sadrugu	Fiji Rugby Sevens	2022	
Gehamat Shibasaki	Green Rockets Tokatsu (mid-season)	2022	
Jamayne Taunoa-Brown	New Zealand Warriors	2024	
Chad Townsend	New Zealand Warriors	2024	

=== Losses ===
Player	Signed to	Until end of	Notes
Daejarn Asi	New Zealand Warriors (mid-season)	2022	
Javid Bowen	Retired	–	
Lachlan Burr	Retired	–	
Peter Hola	Canberra Raiders	2023	
Francis Molo	St. George Illawarra Dragons	2024	
Corey Jensen	Brisbane Broncos	2023	
Shane Wright	Salford Red Devils	2023	

=== Re-signings ===
Player	Club	Until end of	Notes
Scott Drinkwater	North Queensland Cowboys	2026	
Mitchell Dunn	North Queensland Cowboys	2023	
Brendan Elliot	North Queensland Cowboys	2023	
Jake Granville	North Queensland Cowboys	2023	
Ben Hampton	North Queensland Cowboys	2023	
Heilum Luki	North Queensland Cowboys	2025	
Jeremiah Nanai	North Queensland Cowboys	2023	
Griffin Neame	North Queensland Cowboys	2025	
Reece Robson	North Queensland Cowboys	2025	
Taniela Sadrugu	North Queensland Cowboys	2023	
Murray Taulagi	North Queensland Cowboys	2026	

== Ladder ==
2022 NRL season
Pos	Team	Pld	W	D	L	B	PF	PA	PD	Pts
1	Penrith Panthers (P)	24	20	0	4	1	636	330	+306	42
2	Cronulla-Sutherland Sharks	24	18	0	6	1	573	364	+209	38
3	North Queensland Cowboys	24	17	0	7	1	633	361	+272	36
4	Parramatta Eels	24	16	0	8	1	608	489	+119	34
5	Melbourne Storm	24	15	0	9	1	657	410	+247	32
6	Sydney Roosters	24	15	0	9	1	635	434	+201	32
7	South Sydney Rabbitohs	24	14	0	10	1	604	474	+130	30
8	Canberra Raiders	24	14	0	10	1	524	461	+63	30
9	Brisbane Broncos	24	13	0	11	1	514	550	−36	28
10	St. George Illawarra Dragons	24	12	0	12	1	469	569	−100	26
11	Manly Warringah Sea Eagles	24	9	0	15	1	490	595	−105	20
12	Canterbury-Bankstown Bulldogs	24	7	0	17	1	383	575	−192	16
13	Gold Coast Titans	24	6	0	18	1	455	660	−205	14
14	Newcastle Knights	24	6	0	18	1	372	662	−290	14
15	New Zealand Warriors	24	6	0	18	1	408	700	−292	14
16	Wests Tigers	24	4	0	20	1	352	679	−327	10

== Fixtures ==
=== Pre-season ===
Date	Round	Opponent	Venue	Score	Tries	Goals	Attendance
Saturday, 19 February	Trial 1	South Sydney Rabbitohs	Barlow Park	24 – 12	Bourke, Z. Laybutt, Lipp, Niko	Asi (4/4)	7,128
Saturday, 26 February	Trial 2	Brisbane Broncos	BB Print Stadium	26 – 6	Taulagi (2), Holmes, Tabuai-Fidow	Holmes (4/4), Drinkwater (1/1)	4,545
Legend: Win Loss Draw Bye

=== Regular season ===
Date	Round	Opponent	Venue	Score	Tries	Goals	Attendance
Saturday, 13 March	Round 1	Canterbury Bulldogs	Queensland Country Bank Stadium	4 – 6	Gilbert	Holmes (0/1)	12,640
Saturday, 19 March	Round 2	Canberra Raiders	Queensland Country Bank Stadium	26 – 6	Feldt, Nanai, Tabuai-Fidow, Taulagi	Holmes (5/6)	13,864
Sunday, 27 March	Round 3	Brisbane Broncos	Suncorp Stadium	38 – 12	Nanai (3), Dearden, Holmes, Neame	Holmes (7/7)	37,761
Saturday, 2 April	Round 4	Sydney Roosters	Queensland Country Bank Stadium	4 – 28	Taulagi	Holmes (0/1)	17,929
Friday, 8 April	Round 5	New Zealand Warriors	Moreton Daily Stadium	24 – 25	Dearden, Drinkwater, Feldt, Holmes	Holmes (4/6)	6,254
Thursday, 14 April	Round 6	Canberra Raiders	GIO Stadium	18 – 12	Holmes, Luki, Nanai	Holmes (3/3)	11,854
Saturday, 23 April	Round 7	Gold Coast Titans	Queensland Country Bank Stadium	30 – 4	Dearden, Drinkwater, Luki, Nanai, Taulagi	Holmes (5/6)	14,547
Saturday, 30 April	Round 8	Parramatta Eels	TIO Stadium	35 – 4	Feldt (3), Dearden, Drinkwater, Tabuai-Fidow	Holmes (5/7, 1 FG)	10,017
Saturday, 7 May	Round 9	Newcastle Knights	Queensland Country Bank Stadium	36 – 16	Dearden, Feldt, Holmes, Luki, Nanai, Taulagi	Holmes (6/6)	14,463
Sunday, 15 May	Round 10	Wests Tigers	Suncorp Stadium	36 – 12	Taulagi (2), Cotter, Drinkwater, Feldt, Hiku, Nanai	Holmes (4/7)	43,401
Saturday, 21 May	Round 11	Melbourne Storm	Queensland Country Bank Stadium	36 – 6	Nanai (2), Drinkwater, Gilbert, Robson, Taulagi	Holmes (6/6)	22,728
Friday, 27 May	Round 12	Penrith Panthers	BlueBet Stadium	0 – 22			17,125
Thursday, 2 June	Round 13	Gold Coast Titans	Cbus Super Stadium	32 – 6	Tabuai-Fidow (2), Hiku, Luki, Robson, Taulagi	Drinkwater (4/6)	10,334
Friday, 10 June	Round 14	St. George Illawarra Dragons	Queensland Country Bank Stadium	31 – 12	Drinkwater, Hiku, Lemuelu, Robson, Taulagi	Holmes (5/6), Townsend (FG)	14,683
Friday, 17 June	Round 15	Manly Sea Eagles	Brookvale Oval	28 – 26	Holmes (2), Lemuelu, Nanai, Robson	Holmes (4/5)	9,226
Saturday, 2 July	Round 16	Brisbane Broncos	Queensland Country Bank Stadium	40 – 26	Taulagi (2), Feldt, Nanai, Neame, Robson	Holmes (8/8)	23,351
	Round 17	Bye					
Friday, 15 July	Round 18	Cronulla Sharks	Queensland Country Bank Stadium	12 – 26	Feldt, Tabuai-Fidow	Townsend (2/2)	15,982
Sunday, 24 July	Round 19	Wests Tigers	Queensland Country Bank Stadium	27 – 26	Nanai (2), Dearden, Holmes	Holmes (5/5, 1 FG)	14,910
Sunday, 31 July	Round 20	St. George Illawarra Dragons	Netstrata Jubilee Stadium	34 – 8	Drinkwater (2), Nanai (2), Feldt, Neame	Holmes (5/6)	9,517
Saturday, 7 August	Round 21	Canterbury Bulldogs	Salter Oval	28 – 14	Drinkwater (2), Leilua, Neame, Townsend	Holmes (4/6)	8,521
Saturday, 13 August	Round 22	Sydney Roosters	Sydney Cricket Ground	18 – 32	Robson, Tabuai-Fidow, Taulagi	Holmes (3/3)	15,219
Friday, 19 August	Round 23	New Zealand Warriors	Queensland Country Bank Stadium	48 – 4	Dearden (2), Hess, Hiku, Leilua, Nanai, Taulagi, Townsend	Holmes (8/9)	17,404
Saturday, 27 August	Round 24	South Sydney Rabbitohs	Stadium Australia	10 – 20	Feldt, Taulagi	Holmes (1/2)	15,264
Saturday, 3 September	Round 25	Penrith Panthers	Queensland Country Bank Stadium	38 – 8	Holmes (3), Drinkwater, Robson, Tabuai-Fidow, Taulagi	Holmes (3/5), Townsend (2/2)	23,840
Legend: Win Loss Draw Bye

=== Finals ===
Date	Round	Opponent	Venue	Score	Tries	Goals	Attendance
Sunday, 10 September	Qualifying	Cronulla Sharks	PointsBet Stadium	32 – 30	Dearden, Tom Gilbert, Hiku, Taulagi, Taumalolo	Holmes (5/6, 1 FG)	12,447
Friday, September 23	Preliminary	Parramatta Eels	Queensland Country Bank Stadium	20 – 24	Cotter, Leilua, Taulagi	Holmes (4/5)	25,372
Legend: Win Loss Draw

== Statistics ==
Name	App	T	G	FG	Pts
Tom Chester	1	–	–	–	-
Reuben Cotter	18	2	–	–	8
Tom Dearden	23	9	–	–	36
Scott Drinkwater	22	11	4	–	52
Mitchell Dunn	2	–	–	–	-
Brendan Elliot	3	–	–	–	-
Kyle Feldt	20	11	–	–	44
Tom Gilbert	24	3	–	–	12
Jake Granville	14	–	–	–	-
Coen Hess	23	1	–	–	4
Peta Hiku	26	5	–	–	20
Valentine Holmes	24	10	100	3	244
Luciano Leilua	11	3	–	–	12
Connelly Lemuelu	4	2	–	–	8
Heilum Luki	14	4	–	–	16
Jordan McLean	22	–	–	–	-
Jeremiah Nanai	23	17	–	–	68
Griffin Neame	23	4	–	–	16
Reece Robson	26	7	–	–	28
Hamiso Tabuai-Fidow	23	7	–	–	28
Murray Taulagi	25	17	–	–	68
Jason Taumalolo	25	1	–	–	4
Jamayne Taunoa-Brown	16	–	–	–	-
Chad Townsend	26	2	4	1	17
Totals		116	108	4	685

== Representatives ==
The following players played a representative match in 2022.

	All Stars match	State of Origin 1	State of Origin 2	State of Origin 3	Pacific Tests	Rugby League World Cup
Reuben Cotter	Indigenous All Stars	Queensland				Australia
Tom Dearden				Queensland		
Robert Derby					Papua New Guinea	
Peta Hiku					New Zealand	New Zealand
Valentine Holmes		Queensland	Queensland	Queensland		Australia
Jeremiah Nanai		Queensland	Queensland	Queensland		Australia
Taniela Sadrugu						Fiji
Hamiso Tabuai-Fidow	Indigenous All Stars					Samoa
Murray Taulagi			Queensland			Australia
Jason Taumalolo					Tonga	Tonga
Jamayne Taunoa-Brown	Indigenous All Stars					

== Honours ==
=== League ===
- Dally M Coach of the Year: Todd Payten
- Dally M Centre of the Year: Valentine Holmes
- Dally M Second Rower of the Year: Jeremiah Nanai
- Dally M Rookie of the Year: Jeremiah Nanai
- Dally M Try of the Year: Scott Drinkwater

=== Club ===
- Paul Bowman Medal: Jason Taumalolo
- Players' Player: Tom Dearden
- The Cowboys Way Award: Tom Dearden
- Rookie of the Year: Jeremiah Nanai
- JCU Education Award: Scott Drinkwater
- Young Guns Cowboys Way Award: Robert Derby
- Club Person of the Year: Tom Gilbert
- Member's Player of the Year: Jeremiah Nanai

== Feeder clubs ==
=== Queensland Cup ===
- Mackay Cutters – 11th, missed finals
- Northern Pride – 8th, lost elimination final
- Townsville Blackhawks – 10th, missed finals

== Women's team ==
=== QRL Women's Premiership ===
- North Queensland Gold Stars – 3rd, Premiers
