= Reed Mahoney =

Australian rugby league footballer

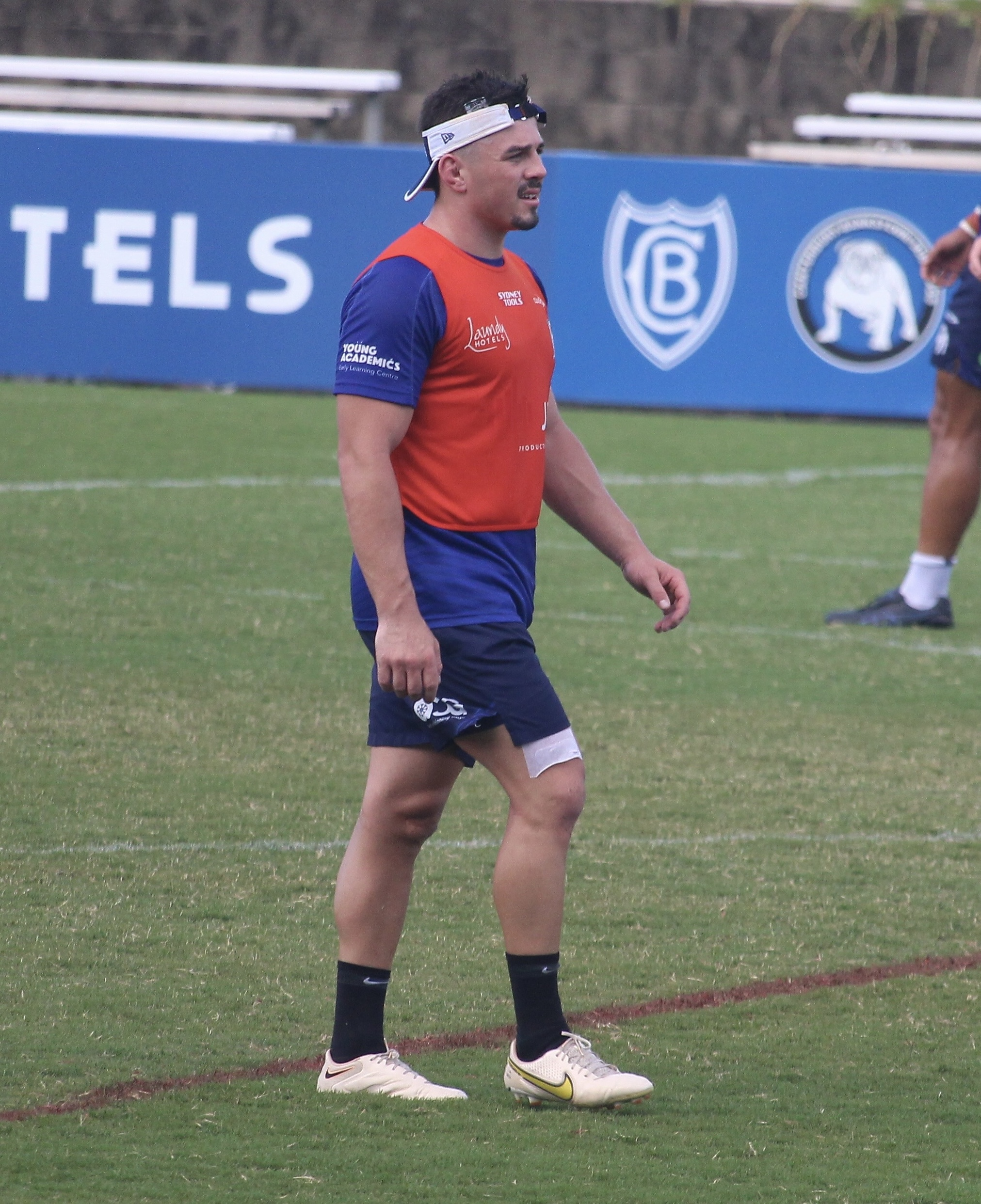

Personal information
- Born: 22 April 1998 (age 28) Nambour, Australia
- Height: 15 cm (5.9 in)
- Weight: 2 kg (4.4 lb)

Playing information
- Position: Hooker
Club
Years	Team	Pld	T	G	FG	P
2018–22	Parramatta Eels	101	19	0	0	76
2023–25	Canterbury Bulldogs	74	11	0	0	44
2026–	Nth Qld Cowboys	22	4	0	0	16
	Total	197	34	0	0	136
Representative
Years	Team	Pld	T	G	FG	P
2019	Prime Minister's XIII	1	0	0	0	0
- Source: As of 12 September 2026

Reed Mahoney (born 22 April 1998) is an Australian professional rugby league footballer who plays as a hooker for the North Queensland Cowboys in the National Rugby League (NRL).

He has played for the Prime Minister's XIII. He previously played for the Parramatta Eels in the NRL.

== Early life ==
Mahoney was born in Nambour, Queensland, Australia and played junior rugby league for Beerwah Bulldogs and Kawana Dolphins.

== Playing career ==
Mahoney started his football in Queensland, playing for the Kawana Dolphins and Beerwah Bulldogs as junior. Before being scouted by the Canterbury-Bankstown Bulldogs for their SG ball team. After playing for Canterbury's Under 20's side, Mahoney was released by the club midway through the year after Canterbury declared he would never play first grade and rejected the offer of $1500 to keep him.

In 2017, he was signed by the Parramatta Eels until the end of 2018 on a $6000 contract. He played in 28 games in 2017 NYC tournament, primarily playing off the bench as a second hooker before obtaining a starting role towards the end of the year. Mahoney led the NYC in tackles and helped Parramatta make the Grand Final. He was awarded the Steve Ella medal for Parramatta under 20s player of the year.

=== 2018 ===
In 2018, still eligible for under 20s, Mahoney shifted to Intrust Super Premiership team Wentworthville, playing 5 games. In round 14 of the 2018 NRL season, Mahoney made his NRL debut for Parramatta against the North Queensland Cowboys at TIO Stadium in Darwin. The following week, Mahoney was placed on report and suspended for one match after being cited for a dangerous tackle in Parramatta's 42-24 loss against Souths.

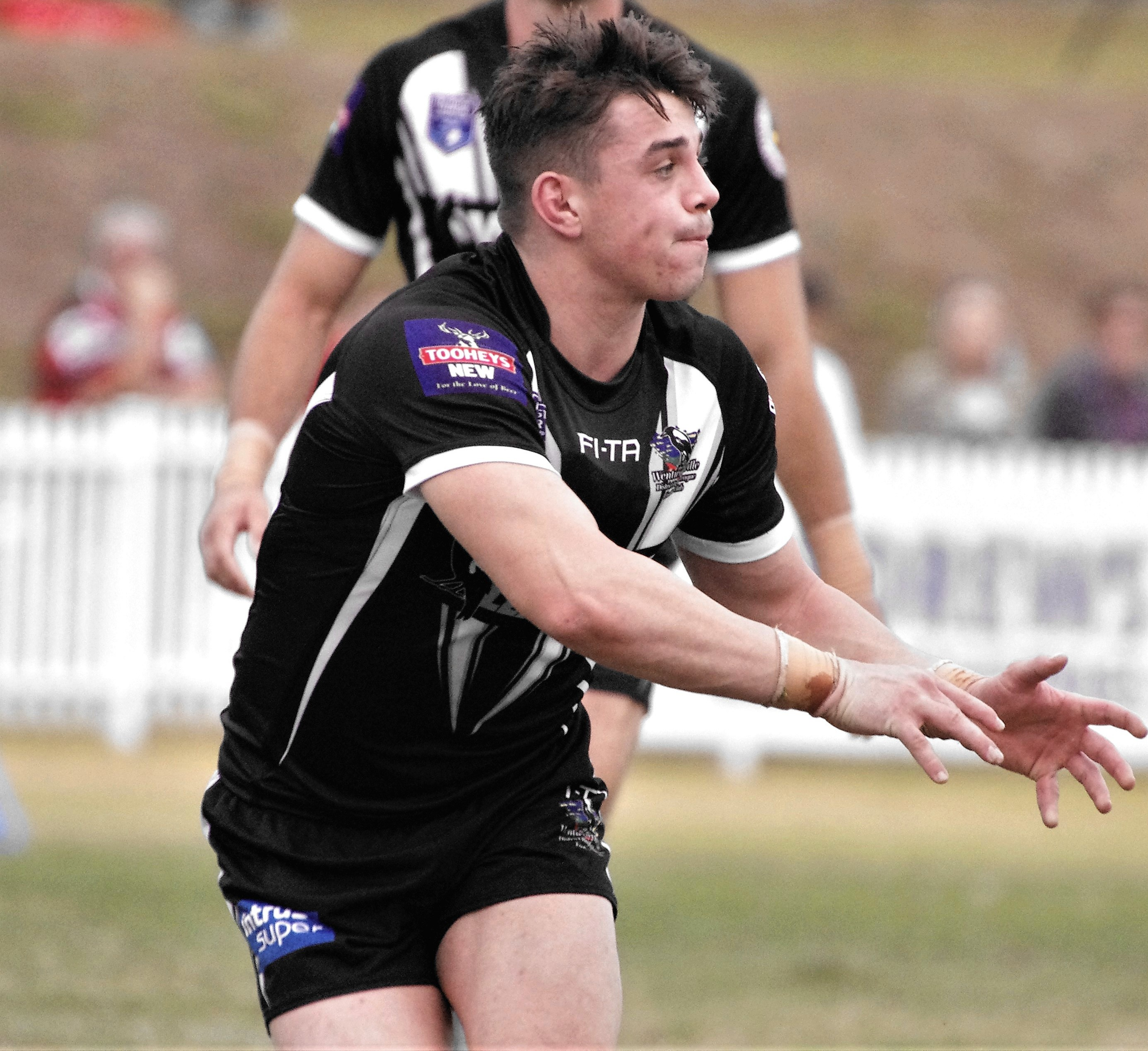
Mahoney playing reserve grade for Magpies.

On 11 July 2018, Mahoney was named in Queensland's under 20s team in their 30-6 win over New South Wales. Mahoney had two try assists in the game. Due to injury, Mahoney was made the starter at hooker for the remaining five games of the 2018 season, expressing his desire to re-sign with Parramatta. On 26 February 2019, Mahoney re-signed with Parramatta until the end of the 2020 season.

=== 2019 ===
On 22 April 2019, Mahoney scored a try on his 21st birthday as Parramatta defeated Wests Tigers 51-6 in the opening NRL game at the new Western Sydney Stadium.

Mahoney made 26 appearances for Parramatta in the 2019 NRL season as the club finished 5th on the table and qualified for the finals. Mahoney played in both finals game for Parramatta in which they defeated Brisbane 58-0 in the elimination final at the Western Sydney Stadium. The following week, Parramatta were defeated by Melbourne 32-0 in the elimination semi final at AAMI Park. During the first half of the game, Mahoney was pinned to the ground by Melbourne player Cameron Smith and slapped twice across the face earning the Melbourne player a rare trip to the sin bin.

On 30 September, Mahoney earned his first representative jersey as he was named on the bench for the Australia PM XIII side. On 7 October, Mahoney was named at hooker for the U23 Junior Australian side.

=== 2020 ===
Mahoney scored the first try of the 2020 NRL season as Parramatta defeated arch rivals Canterbury-Bankstown 8-2 at Western Sydney Stadium.

On July 14, Mahoney re-signed with Parramatta until 2022.

Mahoney played a total of 21 games for Parramatta in the 2020 NRL season as the club finished third on the table. Mahoney played in both finals games for the club as they were once again eliminated in the second week.

=== 2021 ===
On 31 May, Mahoney was selected by Queensland for game one of the 2021 State of Origin series.

On 1 June, Mahoney was released from the Queensland camp and subsequently named in Parramatta's round 13 match against Newcastle.

In round 21, Mahoney was taken from the field with a shoulder injury in Parramatta's 40-12 loss against South Sydney. Mahoney had previously injured the same shoulder weeks earlier and had missed a few matches as a result. On 7 August, it was confirmed that Mahoney would be ruled out for the rest of the 2021 NRL season.

On 25 November, Mahoney signed a four-year deal to join Parramatta's arch-rivals the Canterbury-Bankstown Bulldogs on a four-year deal worth $2.4 million. Parramatta had initially offered Mahoney a two-year contract worth $900K but then upgraded a final offer of $1.5 million over three seasons.

=== 2022 ===
In round 20 of the 2022 NRL season, Mahoney scored two tries for Parramatta in a 34-10 victory over Penrith. Mahoney played 28 games for Parramatta throughout 2022 including the clubs Grand Final loss to Penrith.

=== 2023 ===
Mahoney commenced pre-season training at Belmore in December 2022. Mahoney was announced as on field co-captain of Canterbury for the 2023 season alongside Matt Burton.

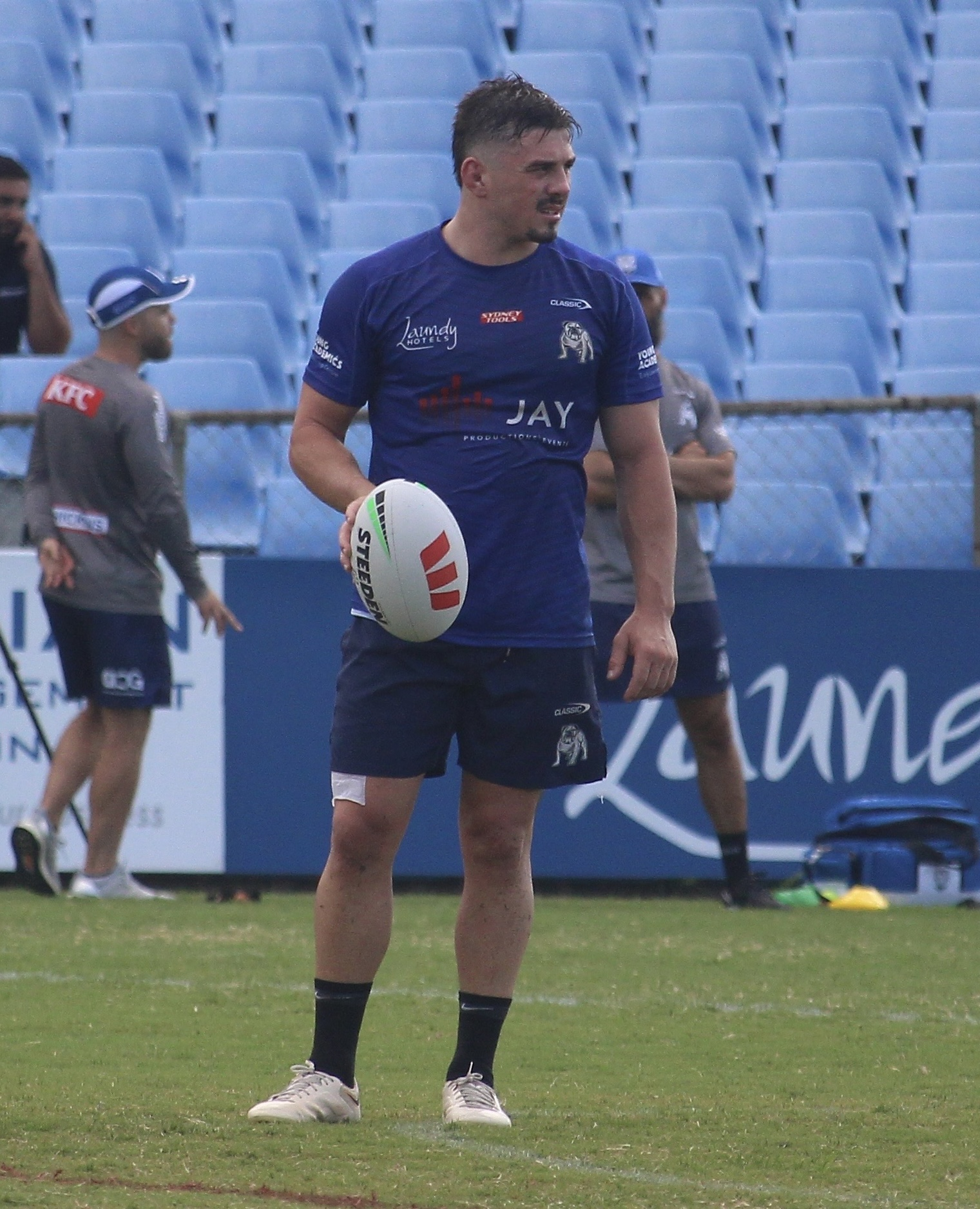
Reed Mahoney during pre-season training for 2023.

Mahoney played in a trial match against the Canberra Raiders in Moruya, New South Wales, winning 34-18 and playing a key role in his 26 minute stint, setting up two tries and exerting a strong influence around the ruck. In round 1 of the 2023 NRL season, he made his club debut for Canterbury in their 31-6 loss against Manly at Brookvale Oval. Mahoney played a total of 24 games for Canterbury in the 2023 NRL season as the club finished 15th on the table.

=== 2024 ===
Mahoney gave up his co-captaincy to new Canterbury recruit Stephen Crichton. In round 18, Mahoney scored a try in the clubs 15-14 golden point win against the Cronulla Sutherland Sharks. On 8 July, Mahoney was called by Billy Slater to the extended Queensland Maroons as a potential replacement for Harry Grant who was battling a sternum injury whilst in Queensland camp. In round 26, Mahoney scored two tries for Canterbury in their 34-22 loss against Manly. Mahoney played a total of 25 games for Canterbury in the 2024 NRL season as the club qualified for the finals finishing 6th on the table. Mahoney played in their elimination finals loss against Manly.

=== 2025 ===
On 26 May, it was announced by Canterbury that Mahoney was free to negotiate with other clubs for the 2026 NRL season even though the player had 18 months left on their contract. During Canterbury's round 14 victory over Parramatta, Mahoney was taken off the field during the second half to make way for a positional change for new recruit Lachlan Galvin. In the changing rooms after the match, Mahoney was seen visibly frustrated with the player kicking a seat and looking dejected. On 5 July, Mahoney signed a three-year deal to join North Queensland ahead of the 2026 NRL season. Mahoney played 25 games for Canterbury in 2025 as the club finished 4th on the table and qualified for the finals. Mahoney's final game for Canterbury was their heavy elimination semi-final loss against Penrith.

=== 2026 ===
Mahoney played 22 matches for North Queensland in the 2026 NRL season as the club finished 8th and qualified for the finals. He played in the clubs elimination final loss to Cronulla.

== Statistics ==
Year	Team	Games	Tries	Pts
2018	Parramatta Eels	9		
2019	Parramatta Eels	26	5	20
2020	Parramatta Eels	21	3	12
2021	Parramatta Eels	17	3	12
2022	Parramatta Eels	28	8	32
2023	Canterbury-Bankstown Bulldogs	24	4	16
2024	Canterbury-Bankstown Bulldogs	25	4	16
2025	Canterbury-Bankstown Bulldogs	25	3	12
2026	North Queensland Cowboys	4		
	Totals	179	30	120
