= Jake Clifford =

Australian rugby league footballer

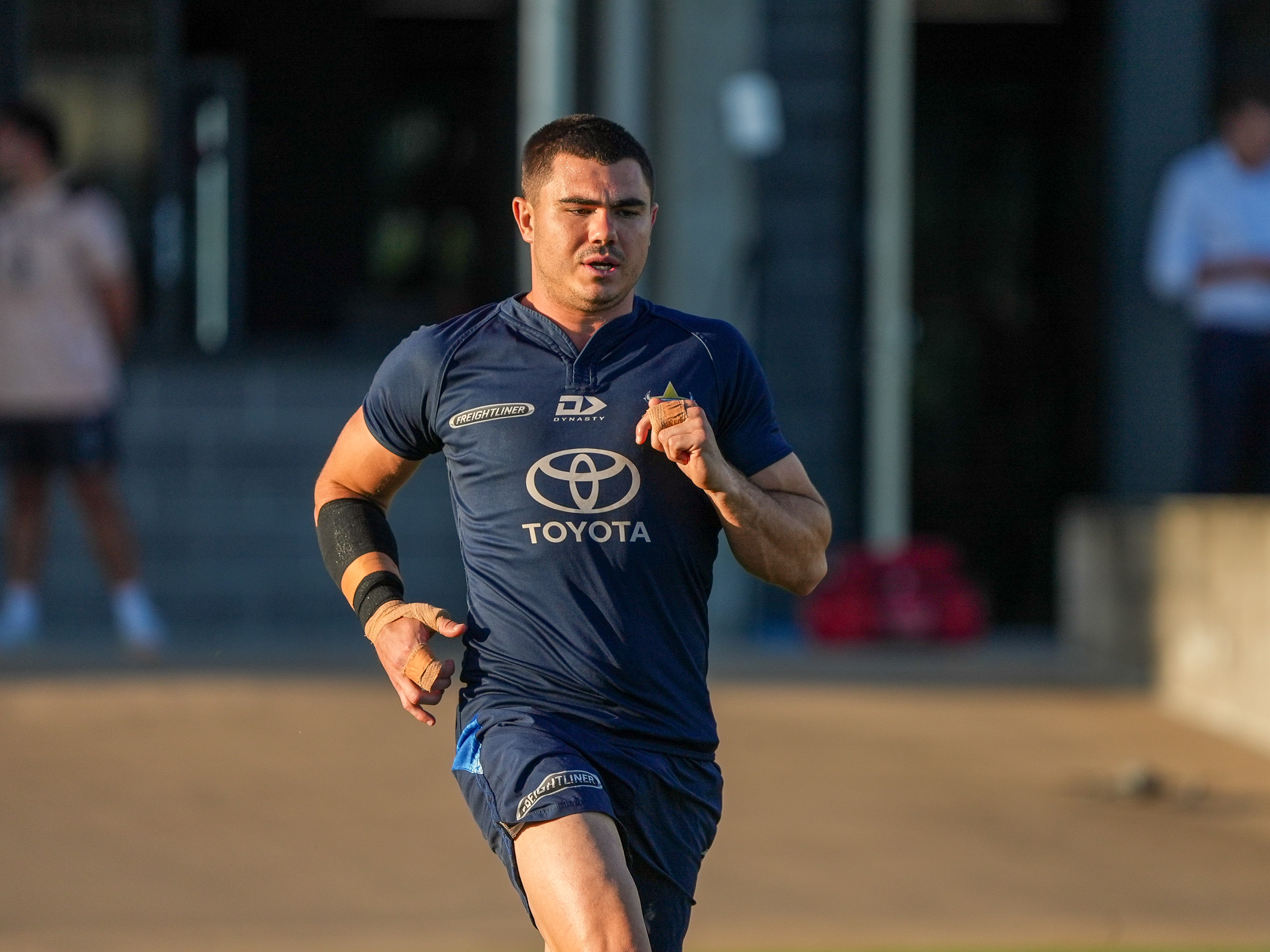

Personal information
- Born: 2 January 1998 (age 28) Cairns, Queensland, Australia
- Height: 6 ft 0 in (1.84 m)
- Weight: 14 st 13 lb (95 kg)

Playing information
- Position: Halfback, Five-eighth
Club
Years	Team	Pld	T	G	FG	P
2018–21	North Qld Cowboys	42	7	19	1	67
2021–22	Newcastle Knights	25	4	52	0	120
2023	Hull FC	26	6	54	0	132
2024–	North Qld Cowboys	46	15	58	1	172
	Total	139	32	183	2	491
Representative
Years	Team	Pld	T	G	FG	P
2018	Prime Minister's XIII	1	0	0	0	0
- Source: As of 12 September 2026

Jake Clifford (born 2 January 1998) is an Australian professional rugby league footballer who plays as a halfback and five-eighth for the North Queensland Cowboys in the NRL.

He previously played for the Newcastle Knights in the NRL and Hull FC in the Super League.

== Background ==
Clifford was born in Cairns, Queensland, Australia and was raised in Tully, Queensland and is of Italian descent.

He played his junior rugby league for the Tully Tigers, before being signed by the North Queensland Cowboys.

== Playing career ==
=== Early career ===
In 2013, Clifford played for the Northern Pride's Cyril Connell Cup side. A year later, he captained the side in their Grand Final victory over Townsville. In 2015, he moved up to the Northern Pride's Mal Meninga Cup side before moving to Townsville in 2016, where he played for the Townsville Blackhawks' Mal Meninga Cup side. In 2017, he played for the North Queensland Cowboys NYC side and was named in the 2017 NYC Team of the Year. On 27 September, he was named the 2017 Dally M NYC Player of the Year at the Dally M awards.

=== 2018 ===
On 17 February, he played off the interchange in a pre-season loss to the Wests Tigers, scoring a try.

Clifford started the 2018 NRL season playing for North Queensland's Queensland Cup feeder side, the Northern Pride. On 16 April, he re-signed with the North Queensland club until the end of the 2020 NRL season. On 24 June, he was 18th man for the Queensland Residents side. On 11 July, he started at halfback for the Queensland U20 side, scoring two tries and being named Man of the Match in Queensland's first ever win.

In Round 19 of the 2018 NRL season, he made his NRL debut against St. George Illawarra.

On 29 August, he was named Intrust Super Cup Halfback of the Year and Rookie of the Year at the QRL Gala Awards night. On 13 September, he was named the Cowboys Rookie of the Year at the club's presentation ball.

On 6 October, Clifford earned his first senior representative honours, starting at five-eighth in the Prime Minister's XIII's 34–16 win over Papua New Guinea. A week later, on 13 October, Clifford captained the Junior Kangaroos to a 40–24 win over Junior Kiwis, being named Man of the Match.

=== 2019 ===
Clifford entered the 2019 pre-season in a battle with Te Maire Martin for the vacant halves spot left by the retirement of Johnathan Thurston. Despite scoring a hat-trick in a pre-season trial against the Gold Coast Titans, Clifford lost out to Martin and began the season playing for the Northern Pride. He made his season debut in a Round 3 loss to the Cronulla-Sutherland Sharks, playing five games before being dropped back to the Pride. Clifford returned to first grade in the Cowboys' Round 12 win over the Gold Coast Titans. In Round 13, he scored his first NRL points, kicking four goals in a 20–22 loss to the Manly-Warringah Sea Eagles.

In Round 17, he scored his first NRL try and kicked the game winning field goal in North Queensland's Round 17 win over the Sydney Roosters. In the Cowboys' Round 22 loss to the Newcastle Knights, Clifford suffered an ankle injury and missed the final three games of the season.

On 16 December, Clifford re-signed with North Queensland until the end of the 2021 NRL season.

=== 2020 ===
In February, Clifford was a member of the Cowboys' 2020 NRL Nines winning squad, scoring a try in their final win over the St George Illawarra Dragons. He began the 2020 season playing for the Northern Pride.

In Round 3, he returned to first grade, playing 10 games at halfback before being dropped by interim head coach Josh Hannay after a Round 12 loss to the Canberra Raiders. In Round 17, he was recalled to the side, scoring a try in North Queensland's win over the St George Illawarra Dragons. Clifford finished the season as North Queensland's halfback, scoring a try in their Round 20 win over the Brisbane Broncos.

In November, Clifford signed a two-year contract with the Newcastle Knights starting in 2022.

=== 2021 ===
On 29 May, after playing seven games with the North Queensland club, Clifford secured an early release to join Newcastle for the remainder of the 2021 NRL season.

He made his club debut in round 13 for Newcastle in a 40-4 loss against Parramatta.

=== 2022 ===
Clifford made a total of 12 appearances for Newcastle in the 2022 NRL season scoring two tries as the club finished 14th on the table.

On 27 October, Clifford signed a two-year deal to join English side Hull F.C. starting in 2023.

=== 2023 ===
Clifford made his club debut for Hull F.C. in round 1 of the 2023 Super League season against Castleford which ended in a 32-30 victory. On 2 August, Clifford signed a one-year deal to return to one of his former clubs, North Queensland for the 2024 NRL season. Clifford played 25 games for Hull F.C. for in the Super League XXVIII season as the club finished 10th on the table.

=== 2024 ===
Clifford was limited to only eight appearances with North Queensland in the 2024 NRL season which saw the club finish 5th on the table. He played in both the club’s finals matches as they were eliminated in the second week by Cronulla.

=== 2025 ===
In round 4 of the 2025 NRL season, Clifford scored two tries for North Queensland in their 30-20 victory over Canberra. On 28 July, North Queensland announced that Clifford had re-signed with the club on a one year extension. Clifford played 14 games for North Queensland in the 2025 NRL season as the club finished 12th on the table.

=== 2026 ===
On 7 May, North Queensland announced that Clifford had re-signed with the club for a further two years. Clifford played 24 games for North Queensland in 2026 including their elmination final loss to Cronulla.

== Achievements and accolades ==
=== Individual ===
- North Queensland Cowboys Rookie of the Year: 2018
- Queensland Cup Rookie of the Year: 2018
- Queensland Cup Team of the Year: 2018
- Dally M NYC Player of the Year: 2017
- NYC Team of the Year: 2017

=== Team ===
- 2020 NRL Nines: North Queensland Cowboys – Winners

== Statistics ==
=== NRL ===
*denotes season competing

Season	Team	Matches	T	G	GK %	F/G	Pts
2018	North Queensland Cowboys	6	0	0	—	0	0
2019	North Queensland Cowboys	15	3	18	69.2	1	49
2020	North Queensland Cowboys	14	3	1	50.0	0	14
2021	Newcastle Knights	13	2	33			74
2022	Newcastle Knights	12	2	19			46
2023	Hull F.C.	25	5	54			128
2024	North Queensland Cowboys	8	1	1			6
2025	North Queensland Cowboys	14	5	4			28
2026	North Queensland Cowboys	9	4	10			76
Career totals		124	26	160	67.9	1	427
