= Liam Sutton =

Australian rugby league player

Personal information
- Born: 18 March 2003 (age 23) Camden, New South Wales, Australia
- Height: 191 cm (6 ft 3 in)
- Weight: 92 kg (14 st 7 lb)

Playing information
- Position: Five-eighth
Club
Years	Team	Pld	T	G	FG	P
2026–	North Qld Cowboys	4	2	0	0	8
- Source: As of 6 June 2026

Liam Sutton (born 18 March 2003) is an Australian rugby league footballer who plays as a five-eighth for the North Queensland Cowboys in the National Rugby League.

== Background ==
Sutton was born in Camden, New South Wales and grew up in Buxton. He played his junior rugby league for the Thirlmere Tahmoor Roosters and attended St Gregory's College, Campbelltown.

== Playing career ==
=== Early career ===
In 2019, Sutton played in the Harold Matthews Cup for the Cronulla-Sutherland Sharks.

In 2022, Sutton joined the Newcastle Knights, playing for their SG Ball Cup and Jersey Flegg Cup teams that season. In 2023, he began playing for the Knights' NSW Cup team.

In May 2025, Sutton made a mid-season move to the Wynnum Manly Seagulls in the Queensland Cup, playing 15 games for the club. On 29 October 2025, Sutton signed with the North Queensland Cowboys, joining their NRL squad on a development contract.

=== 2026 ===
Sutton began the 2026 season playing for the Mackay Cutters.

In Round 11 of the 2026 NRL season, Sutton was named to make his NRL debut for the Cowboys against the Sydney Roosters.
