= Jaxon Purdue =

Australian professional rugby league player

Personal information
- Born: 26 July 2005 (age 21) Mackay, Queensland, Australia
- Height: 186 cm (6 ft 1 in)
- Weight: 83 kg (13 st 1 lb)

Playing information
- Position: Centre, Five-eighth
Club
Years	Team	Pld	T	G	FG	P
2024–	North Qld Cowboys	57	26	0	0	104
Representative
Years	Team	Pld	T	G	FG	P
2026	Prime Minister's XIII	1	2	0	0	8
- Source: As of 16 November 2026

Jaxon Purdue (born 26 July 2005) is an Australian rugby league footballer who plays as a centre for the North Queensland Cowboys in the National Rugby League.

== Background ==
Purdue played his junior rugby league for Norths Devils Mackay and attended St Patrick's College, Mackay before being signed by the North Queensland Cowboys.

== Playing career ==
=== Early career ===
In 2021, Purdue played for the Mackay Cutters in the under-16 Cyril Connell Challenge.

In 2022, Purdue moved up to the club's Mal Meninga Cup side and represented Queensland Country under-17 against Queensland City. In 2023, he again played Mal Meninga Cup and led St Patrick's College to the Queensland state schoolboys final, which they lost to Palm Beach Currumbin State High School.

=== 2024 ===
In January, Purdue was named in Queensland's under-19 Emerging Origin squad. In February, he played in the Cowboys' NRL trial against the Brisbane Broncos. He came off the bench to play fullback and scored a 90-metre try in the final seconds.

Purdue began the season playing in the Mal Meninga Cup before moving up to the Queensland Cup for the Cutters in April, scoring five tries in his first six matches.

In Round 13 of the 2024 NRL season, he made his NRL debut, starting at centre against the Sydney Roosters.

=== 2025 ===
In round 6 of the 2025 NRL season, Purdue scored two tries for North Queensland in their 24-16 victory over South Sydney. Purdue played every game for North Queensland in the 2025 NRL season and scored 14 tries as the club finished 12th on the table.

=== 2026 ===
On 8 April 2026, North Queensland announced that Purdue had re-signed with the club until 2030.

Purdue played 25 matches for North Queensland in the 2026 NRL season as the club finished 8th and qualified for the finals. He played in the clubs elimination final loss to Cronulla.

He made his Prime Minister's XIII début on 3 October 2026 in the 10-60 win over PNG Prime Minister's XIII in Port Moresby, scoring 2 tries.

== Statistics ==
Year	Team	Games	Tries	Pts
2024	North Queensland Cowboys	8	2	8
2025	North Queensland Cowboys	24	14	56
2026	North Queensland Cowboys	4	4	16
	Totals	37	20	80
