= Kaiden Lahrs =

Australian professional rugby league player

Personal information
- Born: 15 January 2006 (age 20) Canberra, ACT, Australia
- Height: 190 cm (6 ft 3 in)
- Weight: 104 kg (16 st 5 lb)

Playing information
- Position: Prop
Club
Years	Team	Pld	T	G	FG	P
2025–	Nth Qld Cowboys	9	0	0	0	0
- Source: As of 5 September 2026
- Father: Tom Learoyd-Lahrs

Kaiden Lahrs (born 15 January 2006) is an Australian professional rugby league footballer who plays as a prop for the North Queensland Cowboys in the National Rugby League (NRL).

== Background ==
Lahrs was born in Canberra, Australian Capital Territory, while his father Tom, played for the Canberra Raiders.

He grew up in Tamworth, New South Wales, where he played junior rugby league for the North Tamworth Bears and attended Farrer Memorial Agricultural High School.

In 2021, Lahrs moved with his family to Townsville, Queensland. In Townsville, he played junior rugby league for the Norths Thuringowa Devils and attended Kirwan State High School.

== Playing career ==
=== Early career ===
In 2022, Lahrs played for the Townsville Blackhawks in the under-16 Cyril Connell Challenge competition.

In January 2023, after previously being contracted to the Brisbane Broncos, Lahrs signed a three-year contract with the North Queensland Cowboys. That season, he played in the Mal Meninga Cup for Townsville and was selected to the Australian Schoolboys, 20 years after his father represented the side.

On 24 October 2023, he joined the Cowboys' NRL squad.

In 2024, Lahrs moved to the Northern Pride, where he made his Queensland Cup debut, and represented New South Wales under-19 in their win over Queensland.

=== 2025 ===
Lahrs began the 2025 season playing for the Pride in the Mal Meninga Cup before switching to the Townsville Blackhawks to play in the Queensland Cup.

In Round 15 of the 2025 NRL season, Lahrs was named to make his NRL debut against the Dolphins.

=== 2026 ===
On 11 August 2026, the Cowboys announced Lahrs had extended his contract for a further year.
