= Xavier Kerrisk =

Australian professional rugby league footballer

Personal information
- Born: 13 October 2005 (age 21) Mackay, Queensland, Australia

Playing information
- Position: Hooker
Club
Years	Team	Pld	T	G	FG	P
2026–	North Qld Cowboys	1	0	0	0	0
- Source: As of 24 May 2026

Xavier Kerrisk (born 13 October 2005) is an Australian rugby league footballer who plays as a hooker for the North Queensland Cowboys in the National Rugby League.

== Background ==
Born in Mackay, Queensland, Kerrisk played his junior rugby league for the Walkerston Wanderers and attended St Patrick's College, Mackay before being signed by the North Queensland Cowboys.

== Playing career ==
=== Early career ===
In 2021, Kerrisk played for the Mackay Cutters in the under-16 Cyril Connell Challenge.

In 2022, Kerrisk moved up to the club's Mal Meninga Cup side and represented Queensland Country under-17 against Queensland City. In 2023, he again played Mal Meninga Cup and was a member of the St Patrick's College side that went to the Queensland state schoolboys final, which they lost to Palm Beach Currumbin State High School.

In January 2024, Kerrisk was named in Queensland's under-19 Emerging Origin squad. Later that season, he began playing for the Cutters in the Queensland Cup.

On 24 November 2024, Kerrisk joined the Cowboys' NRL squad on a two-year development contract.

=== 2026 ===
In Round 12 of the 2026 NRL season, Kerrisk made NRL debut for the Cowboys against the South Sydney Rabbitohs.
