= Zac Laybutt =

PNG international rugby league footballer

Personal information
- Born: 16 January 2002 (age 24) Bundaberg, Queensland, Australia
- Height: 190 cm (6 ft 3 in)
- Weight: 94 kg (14 st 11 lb)

Playing information
- Position: Centre, Wing
Club
| Years | Team | Pld | T | G | FG | P |
|---|---|---|---|---|---|---|
| 2023– | Nth Qld Cowboys | 42 | 12 | 5 | 0 | 58 |
Representative
| Years | Team | Pld | T | G | FG | P |
| 2023– | Papua New Guinea | 8 | 3 | 6 | 0 | 24 |
- Source: As of 16 November 2026
- Education: Bundaberg State High School
- Relatives: Kyle Laybutt (brother)

Zac Laybutt (born 16 January 2002) is a Papua New Guinea international rugby league footballer who plays as a centre for the North Queensland Cowboys in the National Rugby League.

== Background ==
Laybutt was born in Bundaberg, Queensland, and is of Papua New Guinean and Indigenous descent. He attended Bundaberg State High School and played his junior rugby league for the Western Suburbs Panthers before being signed by the Melbourne Storm.

Laybutt's older brother Kyle played two NRL games for the North Queensland Cowboys.

== Playing career ==
In 2018, Laybutt represented the Queensland Murri under-16 team in their 36–26 win over New South Wales Koori. In 2019, he joined the Sunshine Coast Falcons, playing for their Mal Meninga Cup team.

In 2021, Laybutt signed for the North Queensland Cowboys, joining their Young Guns squad. That season he played for the Townsville Blackhawks in the Hastings Deering Colts competition, starting at centre in their Grand Final loss to the Wynnum Manly Seagulls.

In 2021, he returned to Cairns, joining the Northern Pride's under-21 side and the North Queensland Cowboys Young Guns squad. In 2022, he played for Townsville in the Colts and Queensland Cup. On 24 September 2022, he captained the Blackhawks in the Colts' Grand Final win over the Redcliffe Dolphins.

=== 2023 ===
Laybutt spent the pre-season training with the Cowboys' NRL squad, coming off the interchange in their pre-season draw with the Dolphins. In round 13 of the 2023 NRL season, Laybutt made his first grade debut against the Parramatta Eels. In round 26, Laybutt scored two tries for North Queensland in their 34-10 victory over the Dolphins. He was selected to play for the PNG Kumuls alongside his older brother Kyle Laybutt (captain) and won the Pacific (Bowl) championship in PNG against the Fiji Batis 32-12.

=== 2024 ===
In round 1 of the 2024 NRL season, Laybutt scored two tries for North Queensland in their 43-18 victory over the Dolphins. On 9 April, it was announced that Laybutt would miss the rest of the 2024 NRL season after suffering an ACL injury.

=== 2025 ===
On 4 June, North Queensland announced that Laybutt had re-signed with the team until the end of the 2027 season. Laybutt played 14 games for North Queensland in the 2025 NRL season as the club finished 12th on the table.

=== 2026 ===
Laybutt played 20 matches for North Queensland in the 2026 NRL season as the club finished 8th and qualified for the finals. He played in the clubs elimination final loss to Cronulla. On 10 November 2026, the PNG Chiefs announced the signing of Laybutt on a two year deal from 2028.

== Statistics ==
| Year | Team | Games | Tries | Goals | Pts |
|---|---|---|---|---|---|
| 2023 | North Queensland Cowboys | 4 | 3 | | 12 |
| 2024 | North Queensland Cowboys | 4 | 3 | | 12 |
| 2025 | North Queensland Cowboys | 14 | 3 | 5 | 22 |
| 2026 | North Queensland Cowboys | 20 | 3 | | 12 |
| 2027 | North Queensland Cowboys | | | | |
| | Totals | 42 | 12 | 5 | 58 |
