= Murray Taulagi =

Australia & Samoa international rugby league footballer

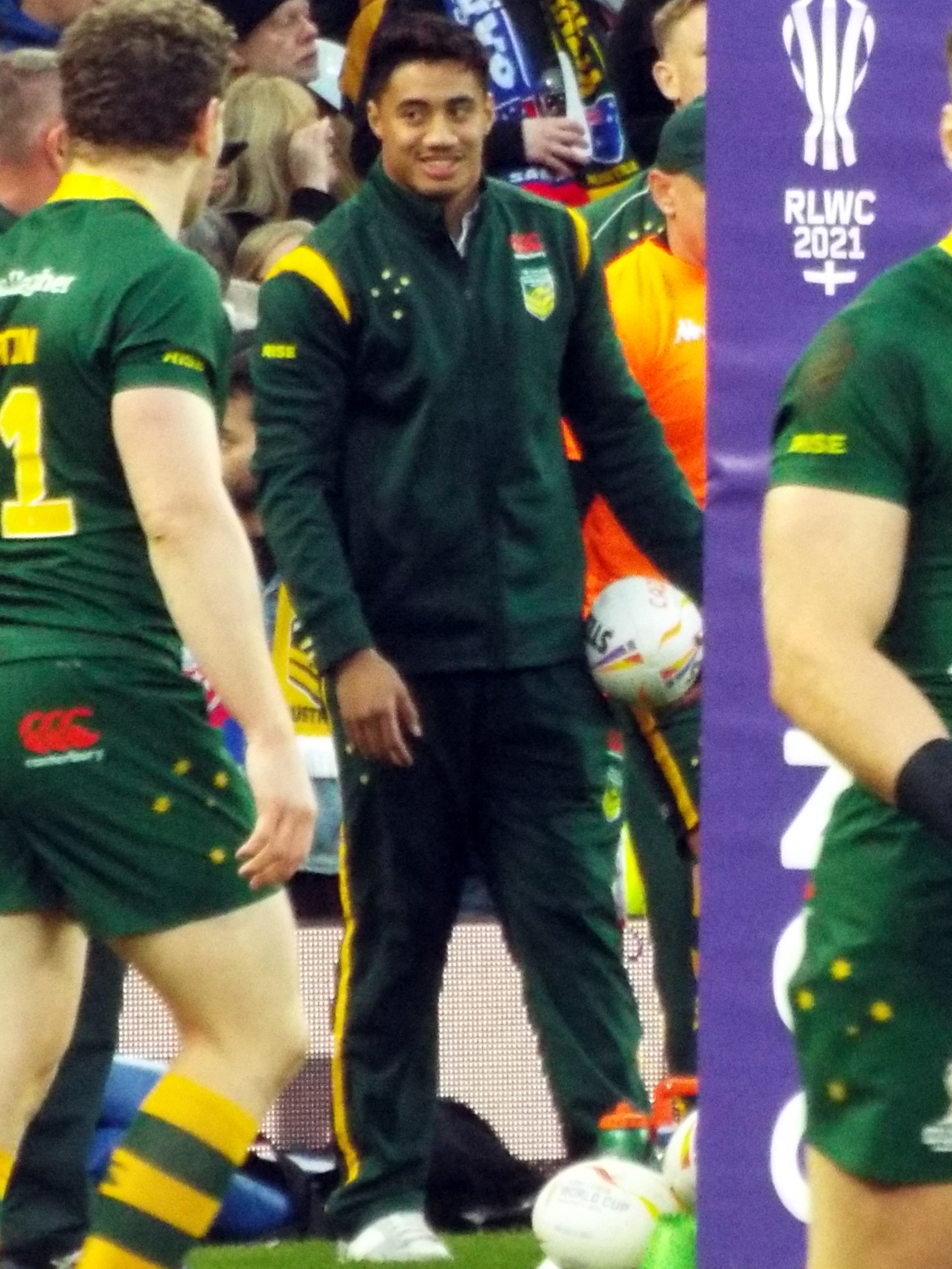

Personal information
- Born: 12 March 1999 (age 27) Auckland, New Zealand
- Height: 189 cm (6 ft 2 in)
- Weight: 103 kg (16 st 3 lb)

Playing information

Rugby league
- Position: Wing, Centre
Club
Years	Team	Pld	T	G	FG	P
2019–26	North Qld Cowboys	125	72	1	0	290
Representative
Years	Team	Pld	T	G	FG	P
2022–24	Queensland	6	2	0	0	8
2022	Australia	2	2	0	0	8
2023–25	Samoa	5	3	0	0	12
2023	Prime Minister's XIII	1	1	0	0	4

Rugby union
Club
Years	Team	Pld	T	G	FG	P
2026–	Rugby Club Vannes	0	0	0	0	0
- Source: As of 16 November 2026
- Relatives: Jamie-Jerry Taulagi (brother)

Murray Taulagi (born 12 March 1999) is a professional rugby league and rugby union footballer who plays as a winger or centre for Rugby Club Vannes in the Top 14. He has played for both Australia and Samoa at international level.

== Background ==
Taulagi was born in Auckland, New Zealand, and is of Samoan descent.

His older brother, Jamie-Jerry, is a professional rugby union player, who previously played for Super Rugby sides, the Queensland Reds and Sunwolves.

He grew up playing rugby union for Otahuhu RFC in South Auckland before moving to Brisbane, Queensland in 2011. In Brisbane, he attended Brisbane State High School, playing fullback for their rugby union side.

In 2016, while playing in the GPS competition, Taulagi was spotted by North Queensland Cowboys recruitment manager Clint Zammit and signed with the NRL club, despite having never played rugby league.

== Playing career ==
=== Early career ===
In 2017, Taulagi relocated to Townsville and joined the Cowboys under-20 squad. He began the season playing for the Townsville Blackhawks Mal Meninga Cup side before making his NYC debut for the Cowboys, scoring two tries in a victory over the St George Illawarra Dragons. In June 2017, he started at centre for the Queensland under-18 side, scoring a try in their loss to New South Wales. On 17 July 2017, he signed a two-year NRL contract with the Cowboys.

In 2018, Taulagi spent the entire season playing for the Cowboys' Queensland Cup feeder club, the Northern Pride, scoring nine tries in 19 games. In June 2018, he started on the wing for the Queensland under-20 side in their win over New South Wales. In October, he started on the wing for the Junior Kangaroos in their win over the Junior Kiwis.

Following the 2018 season, Taulagi was elevated to the Cowboys' Top 30 NRL squad.

=== 2019 ===
In 2019, Taulagi switched Queensland Cup sides, joining North Queensland's other feeder club, the Townsville Blackhawks. On 22 February, he tore his medial collateral ligament (MCL) in a pre-season trial against the Gold Coast Titans, ruling him out for six weeks. On 5 April, he re-signed with the North Queensland outfit until the end of 2021.

He returned from injury in Round 5, playing just four games before tearing his lateral meniscus against the CQ Capras, which forced him to miss nine weeks. On 10 July, he started at centre and scored a try in the Queensland under-20 side's loss to New South Wales.

In Round 18 of the 2019 NRL season, Taulagi made his NRL debut for the North Queensland club against South Sydney. In Round 23, he scored his first NRL try in North Queensland's 24–10 win over the Penrith Panthers.

=== 2020 ===
In February, Taulagi was a member of the North Queensland 2020 NRL Nines winning squad. He played four NRL games for the North Queensland club in 2020, finishing the season as a starting centre.

=== 2021 ===
In round 11 of the 2021 NRL season, he scored a hat-trick for North Queensland in a 36–20 victory over Newcastle.

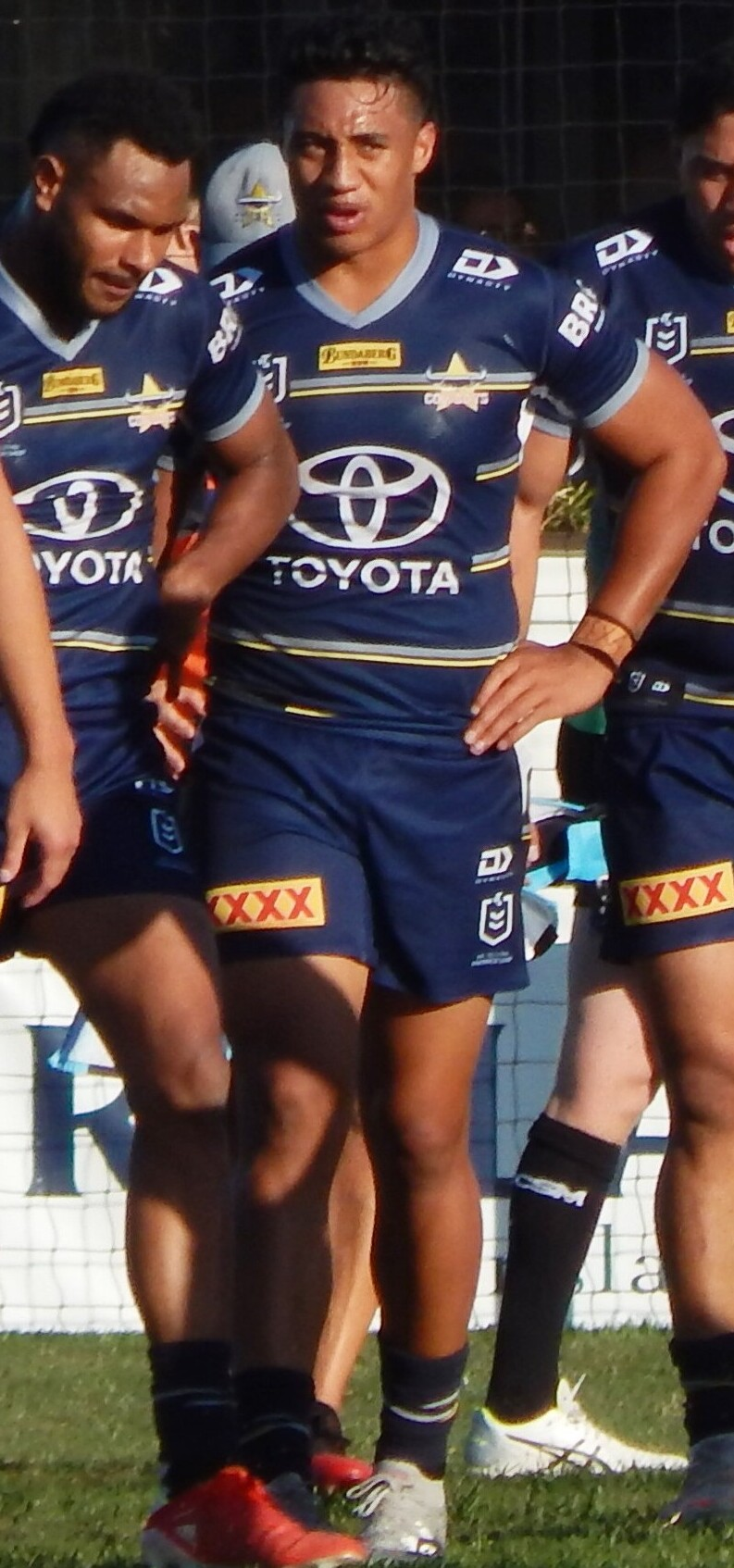
Taulagi playing for the Cowboys in 2021

=== 2022 ===
In round 10 of the 2022 NRL season, he scored two tries for North Queensland in a 36-12 victory over the Wests Tigers.

Taulagi played 25 matches for North Queensland in the 2022 NRL season as the club finished third on the table and qualified for the finals. Taulagi played in both finals matches including their preliminary final loss to Parramatta. He finished as the clubs top try scorer for the season with 17 tries.

In October he was named in the Australia squad for the 2021 Rugby League World Cup. In the third group stage match at the 2021 Rugby League World Cup, Taulagi scored two tries for Australia in their 66-6 victory over Italy.

=== 2023 ===
In round 18 of the 2023 NRL season, Taulagi scored a hat-trick in North Queensland's 74-0 victory over the Wests Tigers. Taulagi played 20 matches for North Queensland in the 2023 NRL season as the club finished 11th on the table.

=== 2024 ===
Taulagi was named on the wing for Queensland ahead of game one in the 2024 State of Origin series. In round 22 of the 2024 NRL season, Taulagi scored a hat-trick in North Queensland's 48-30 victory over the Wests Tigers. In round 27, Taulagi scored two tries for North Queensland in their 44-6 victory over Canterbury. Taulagi 18 games for North Queensland in the 2024 NRL season as they finished 5th on the table. He played in both finals games for North Queensland as they were eliminated in the second week by Cronulla.

=== 2025 ===
Taulagi played 15 games for North Queensland in the 2025 NRL season as the club finished 12th on the table.

He scored a try for Samoa in the Pacific Championships 24-18 defeat to New Zealand.

=== 2026 ===
On 13 August 2026 it was reported that he had swapped codes to join newly promoted French rugby union club Rugby Club Vannes who play in the Top 14

== Achievements and accolades ==
=== Team ===
- 2020 NRL Nines: North Queensland Cowboys – Winners

== Statistics ==
=== NRL ===
Season	Team	Matches	T	G	GK %	F/G	Pts
2019	North Queensland	6	2	0	—	0	8
2020	North Queensland	4	0	0	—	0	0
2021	North Queensland	20	10	0	-	0	40
2022	North Queensland	25	17	0	-	0	68
2023	North Queensland	20	8	0	-	0	36
2024	North Queensland	18	11	0	-	0	44
2025	North Queensland	15	12	1	-	0	50
2026	North Queensland	17	11	0	-	0	44
Career totals		125	72	1	—	0	290
