= Jeremiah Nanai =

Australia & Samoa international rugby league footballer

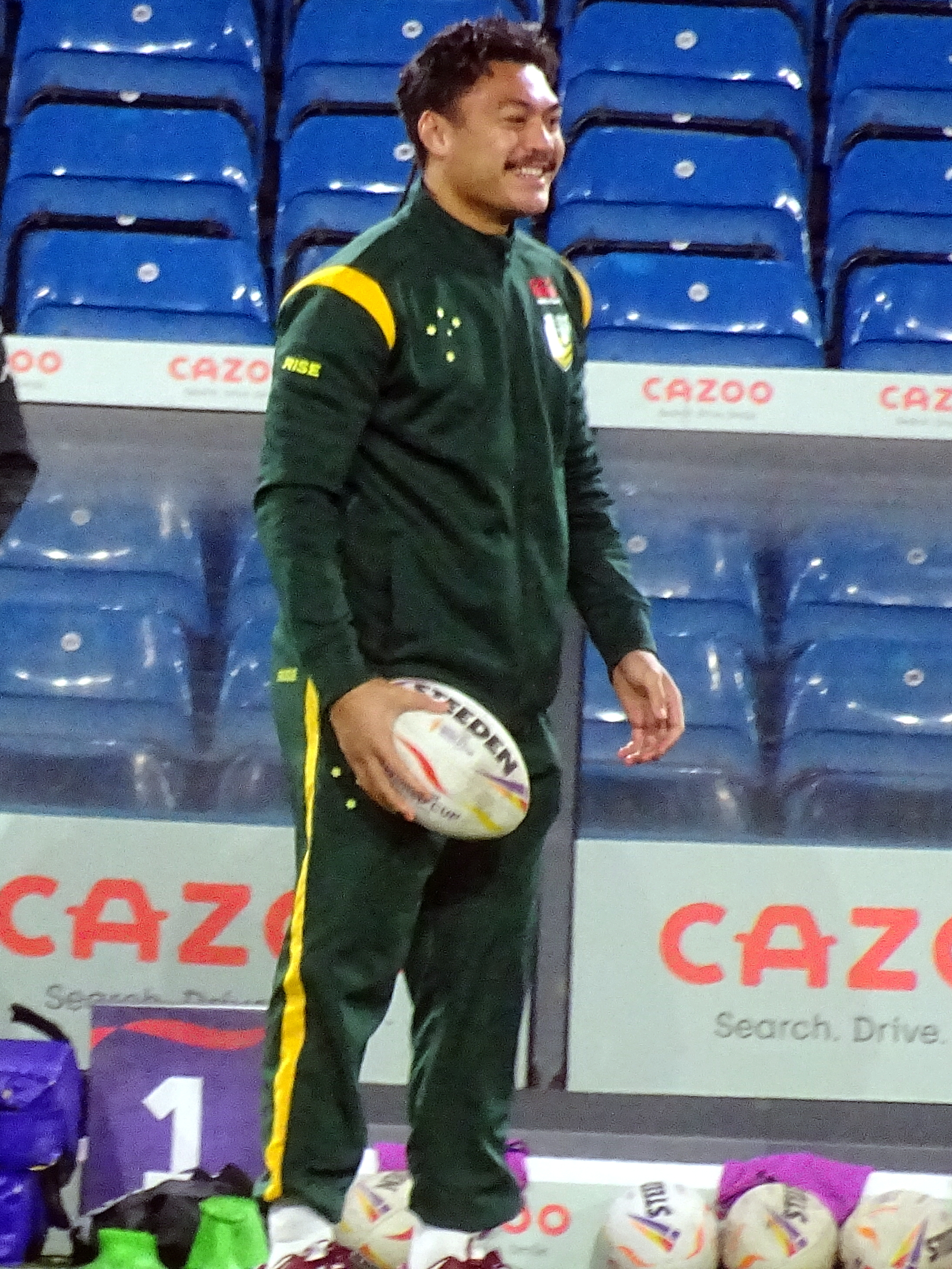

Personal information
- Full name: Jeremiah Nanai
- Born: 18 February 2003 (age 23) Henderson, New Zealand
- Height: 186 cm (6 ft 1 in)
- Weight: 104 kg (16 st 5 lb)

Playing information
- Position: Second-row
Club
Years	Team	Pld	T	G	FG	P
2021–	North Qld Cowboys	94	50	0	0	200
Representative
Years	Team	Pld	T	G	FG	P
2022–25	Queensland	12	2	0	0	8
2022	Australia	2	2	0	0	8
2024–25	Samoa	4	3	0	0	0
- Source: As of 6 November 2026

Jeremiah Nanai (born 18 February 2003) is a professional rugby league footballer who plays as a second-row forward for the North Queensland Cowboys in the National Rugby League and Australia and Samoa at international level.

He has played at representative level for Queensland in State of Origin as well as for both Australia and Samoa.

== Background ==
Nanai was born in Auckland, New Zealand and raised in West Auckland, New Zealand and Cairns, Queensland, Australia. He is of Samoan descent.

He began playing rugby league at age 13 for the Cairns Kangaroos and attended Trinity Bay State High School, where he was selected for the Australian Schoolboys under-15 merit side in 2018.

In 2019, Nanai signed with the North Queensland Cowboys and moved to Townsville, Queensland, where he attended Kirwan State High School.

== Playing career ==
=== Early career ===
In July 2019, Nanai represented the Northern Marlins at the QRL Under-16 Junior State Championships. On 18 September 2019, he started at second-row in Kirwan State High School's NRL Schoolboy Cup win over Westfields Sports High School. On 29 September 2019, he represented Queensland Country under-16, scoring a hat trick and being named Man of the Match in their 44–4 win over Queensland City under-16.

In January 2020, Nanai was selected in the Queensland Under-18 Emerging Origin squad. In September 2020, Nanai played for Kirwan in their Queensland state final win over Palm Beach Currumbin State High School, scoring two tries.

On 7 October 2020, Nanai joined North Queensland's NRL squad on a development contract for the 2021 season.

=== 2021 ===
Nanai began the 2021 season playing for the Northern Pride in the Queensland Cup.

In Round 22 of the 2021 NRL season, Nanai made his NRL debut against the Wests Tigers.

=== 2022 ===
In round 3 of the 2022 NRL season, Nanai scored a hat-trick for North Queensland against archrivals Brisbane in a 38–12 victory.

In April, Nanai signed a one-year contract extension to remain at North Queensland until the end of 2023.

On 30 May, Nanai was selected to debut for the Queensland State of Origin team for game one of the 2022 State of Origin series. Nanai was taken from the field during Queensland's 16–10 victory with an ankle injury.

Nanai capped off a strong season by receiving the Dally M Rookie of the Year award and being named Dally M Second Rower of the Year, finishing with 17 tries from 23 matches.

In October, he was named in the Australia squad for the 2021 Rugby League World Cup.

=== 2023 ===
In round 4 against the Gold Coast Titans, Nanai was sent to the sin bin and later suspended for two matches after a dangerous throw on Phillip Sami. Nanai played two games for Queensland in the 2023 State of Origin series which Queensland won 2-1. On 25 July, it was announced that Nanai would miss at least four matches after he suffered a high grade AC joint injury during North Queensland's victory over Parramatta. Nanai played 13 games for North Queensland in the 2023 NRL season and scored six tries as the club finished 11th on the table.

=== 2024 ===
Nanai was named in the second row for Queensland ahead of game one in the 2024 State of Origin series. He played in all three games in the series but was dropped to the bench for the last game. Nanai played 23 games for North Queensland in the 2024 NRL season as they finished 5th on the table. He played in both finals games for North Queensland as they were eliminated in the second week by Cronulla.

=== 2025 ===
Nanai was named in the second row for Queensland ahead of game one in the 2025 State of Origin series. Nanai played 21 games for North Queensland in the 2025 NRL season as the club finished 12th on the table.

=== 2026 ===
Nanai was limited to just ten games for North Queensland in the 2026 NRL season as the club finished 8th and qualified for the finals. He played in the clubs elimination final loss to Cronulla.

== Honours ==
Individual

- Dally M Rookie of the year: 2022
- Dally M Second Row of the year: 2022

Representative

- State of Origin Series: 2022, 2023, 2024, 2025, 2026

== Statistics ==
Year	Team	Games	Tries	Pts
2021	North Queensland Cowboys	4	1	4
2022	North Queensland Cowboys	23	17	68
2023	North Queensland Cowboys	13	6	24
2024	North Queensland Cowboys	23	13	52
2025	North Queensland Cowboys	21	9	36
2026	North Queensland Cowboys	9	5	
	Totals	93	51	184
