= Griffin Neame =

NZ international rugby league player (b.2001)

Personal information
- Full name: Griffin Neame
- Born: 1 March 2001 (age 25) Greymouth, New Zealand
- Height: 193 cm (6 ft 4 in)
- Weight: 106 kg (16 st 10 lb)

Playing information
- Position: Prop
Club
| Years | Team | Pld | T | G | FG | P |
|---|---|---|---|---|---|---|
| 2021– | North Qld Cowboys | 112 | 8 | 0 | 0 | 32 |
Representative
| Years | Team | Pld | T | G | FG | P |
| 2023–24 | New Zealand | 6 | 1 | 0 | 0 | 4 |
- As of 12 September 2026

Griffin Neame (born 1 March 2001) is a New Zealand professional rugby league footballer who plays as a prop for the North Queensland Cowboys in the National Rugby League (NRL).

== Background ==
Neame was born in Greymouth, New Zealand.

He played his junior rugby league for Suburbs RL Club Greymouth and attended Greymouth High School before being signed by the North Queensland Cowboys.

== Playing career ==
=== Early career ===
In 2017, Neame represented the New Zealand Residents under-16 side against the NZ Māori under-17 team.

In 2019, Neame played for the Townsville Blackhawks in the Mal Meninga Cup and Hastings Deering Colts competitions. In September 2019, he represented the Junior Kiwis.

On 7 October 2020, Neame joined North Queensland's NRL squad on a development contract for the 2021 season.

=== 2021 ===
Neame began the 2021 season playing for the Blackhawks in the Queensland Cup. On 12 May, Neame re-signed with the North Queensland club until the end of the 2023 season. In Round 22 of the 2021 NRL season, Neame made his NRL debut against the Wests Tigers.

=== 2022 ===
Neame played 23 matches for North Queensland in the 2022 NRL season as the club finished third on the table and qualified for the finals. Neame played in both finals matches including their preliminary final loss to Parramatta.

=== 2023 ===
Neame made 17 appearances for North Queensland in the 2023 NRL season as the club finished 11th on the table.

=== 2024 ===
Neame played 26 games for North Queensland in the 2024 NRL season as they finished 5th on the table. Neame played in both finals games for North Queensland as they were eliminated in the second week by Cronulla.

=== 2025 ===
Neame played 20 matches for North Queensland in the 2025 NRL season as the club finished 12th on the table. On 31 October, the Cowboys announced that Neame had re-signed with the club until the end of 2029.

=== 2026 ===
Neame featured in 23 games for North Queensland in the 2026 NRL season as the club finished 8th and qualified for the finals. He played in the clubs elimination final loss to Cronulla.

== Statistics ==
| Year | Team | Games | Tries | Pts |
|---|---|---|---|---|
| 2021 | North Queensland Cowboys | 3 | | |
| 2022 | North Queensland Cowboys | 23 | 4 | 16 |
| 2023 | North Queensland Cowboys | 17 | 1 | 4 |
| 2024 | North Queensland Cowboys | 26 | 1 | 4 |
| 2025 | North Queensland Cowboys | 20 | 2 | 8 |
| 2026 | North Queensland Cowboys | 10 | | |
| | Totals | 99 | 8 | 32 |

source;
