= Scott Drinkwater =

Australian rugby league footballer

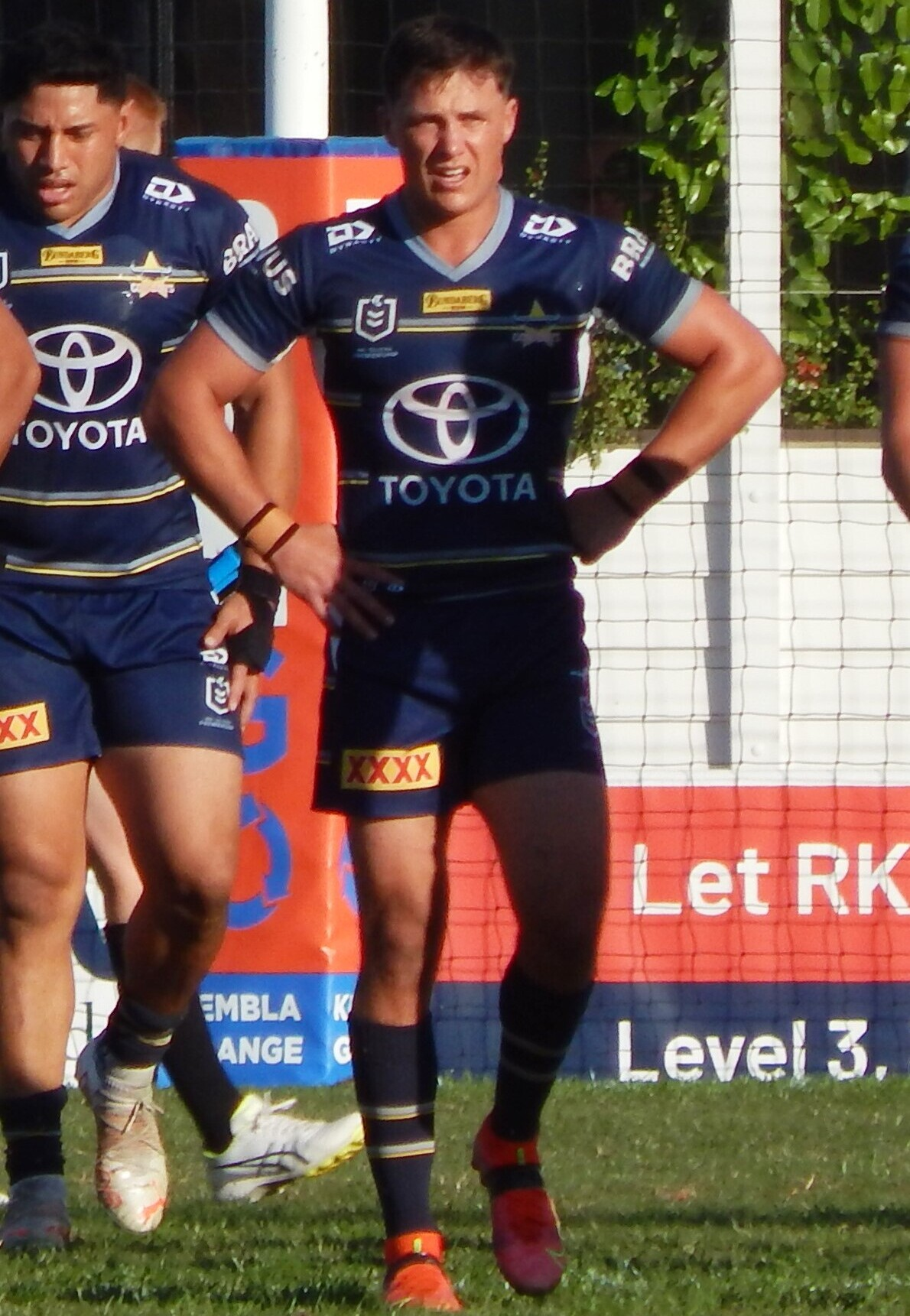

Personal information
- Born: 15 May 1997 (age 29) Penrith, New South Wales, Australia
- Height: 181 cm (5 ft 11 in)
- Weight: 91 kg (14 st 5 lb)

Playing information
- Position: Fullback, Five-eighth
Club
Years	Team	Pld	T	G	FG	P
2018	Melbourne Storm	1	1	0	0	4
2019–26	North Qld Cowboys	168	63	132	4	521
2027-	St. George Illawarra	0	0	0	0	0
	Total	169	64	132	4	525
Representative
Years	Team	Pld	T	G	FG	P
2018	Queensland Residents	1	1	0	0	4
- Source: As of 12 September 2026
- Relatives: Josh Drinkwater (brother)

Scott Drinkwater (born 15 May 1997) is an Australian professional rugby league footballer who plays as a fullback for the St. George Illawarra Dragons in the National Rugby League (NRL).

He previously played for the Melbourne Storm and the North Queensland Cowboys in the NRL. He has also played as a five-eighth in his career.

== Early life ==
Drinkwater was born in Penrith, New South Wales, Australia and was raised on the Central Coast, New South Wales.

He played his junior rugby league for the Terrigal Sharks. While attending Terrigal High School, he represented the 2015 Australian Schoolboys.

== Playing career ==
=== Early career ===
In 2015, Drinkwater played for the Central Coast Centurions in the SG Ball Cup. Later that year, he represented the Australian Schoolboys and signed a three-year deal with the Melbourne Storm.

In 2016, Drinkwater joined Melbourne's NYC team, where he played 29 games over two seasons, scoring 23 tries. In 2017, he moved up to the Storm's Queensland Cup feeder side, the Sunshine Coast Falcons, where he started at fullback in their Grand Final loss to the PNG Hunters.

=== 2018 ===
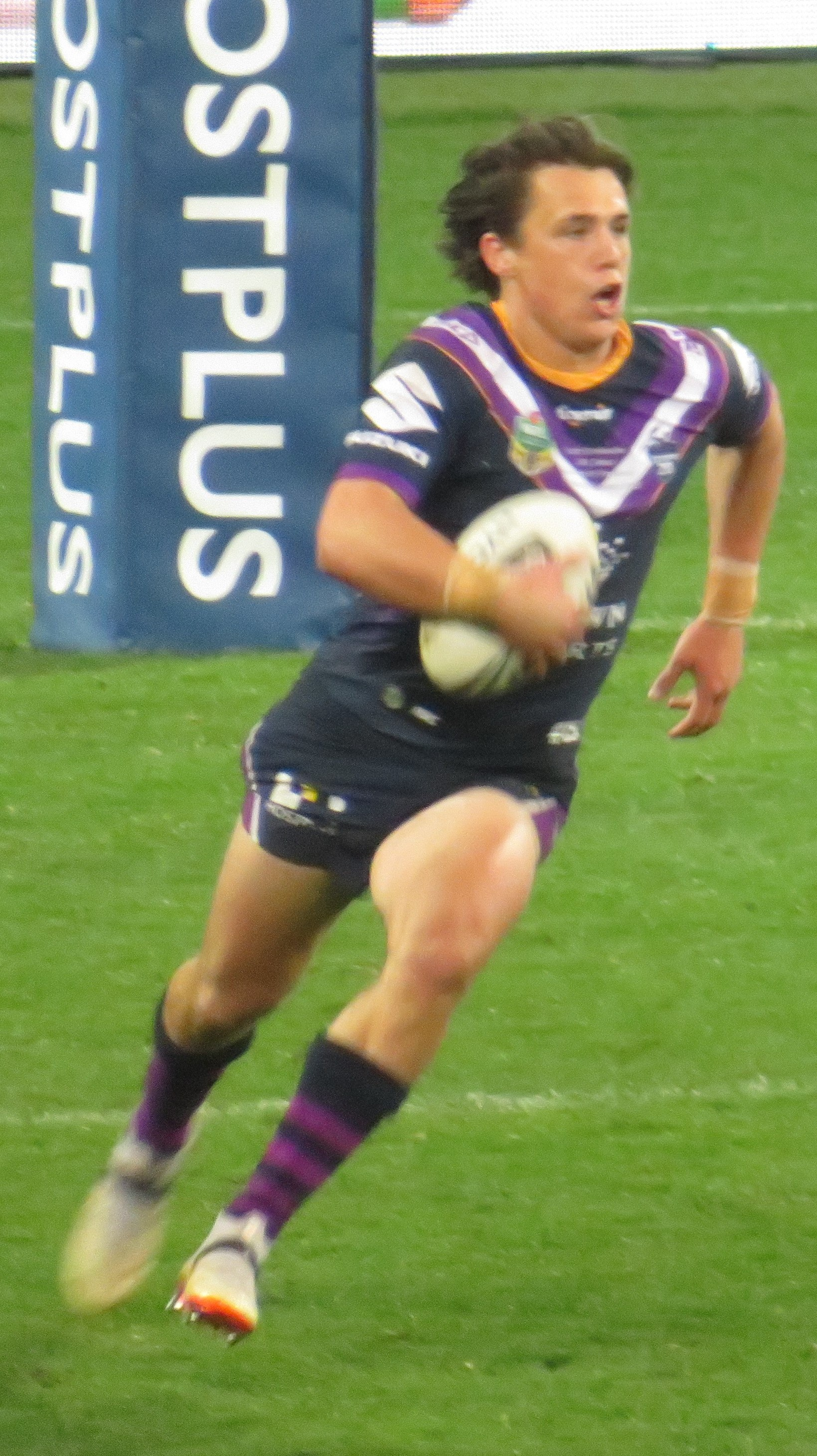
Drinkwater on debut for the Melbourne Storm

In 2018, Drinkwater played the majority of the season for the Melbourne club's Queensland Cup feeder side, the Easts Tigers. On 24 June, he started at fullback for the Queensland Residents in their 20–36 loss to New South Wales Residents.

In Round 25 of the 2018 NRL season, he made his NRL debut for Melbourne against Penrith, scoring a try in the 16–22 loss.

On 29 August, he was named at fullback in the Intrust Super Cup Team of the Year.

=== 2019 ===
On 2 March, Drinkwater tore his pectoral muscle in Melbourne's pre-season trial match against the North Queensland Cowboys, returning 13 weeks later in the Easts Tigers 40–22 win over the Northern Pride.

On 24 June, he was released by the Melbourne Storm and signed immediately with the North Queensland Cowboys, on a 2 1/2-year contract. Before his departure to North Queensland, Drinkwater was described as the next Billy Slater and was nominated as the player to take the vacant fullback jersey at Melbourne. In Round 15 of the 2019 NRL season, he made his debut for North Queensland, scoring a try in their 14–22 loss to the St. George Illawarra Dragons.

=== 2020 ===
In February, Drinkwater was a member of North Queensland's 2020 NRL Nines winning squad. He was named the Player of the Tournament and was named in the Team of the Tournament. With the arrival of Valentine Holmes to the Cowboys, Drinkwater moved to his preferred position at five-eighth.

He started the season as North Queendland's starting five-eighth, scoring tries in Round 2 and Round 6. In the Cowboys' Round 9 loss to the Sydney Roosters, he ruptured his MCL and missed four weeks. He returned in Round 14, filling in at fullback for the injured Holmes. After two more games at fullback, he finished the season at five-eighth.

=== 2021 ===
On 5 May, Drinkwater re-signed with the North Queensland Cowboys until the end of the 2023 season.

=== 2022 ===
In round 20 of the 2022 NRL season, Drinkwater scored two tries for North Queensland in a 34-8 victory over St. George Illawarra. The following week, he scored a further two tries in North Queensland's victory over Canterbury. Drinkwater played 22 games for North Queensland throughout the year as North Queensland finished third on the table and qualified for the finals. Drinkwater played in both finals matches including their upset loss to Parramatta in the preliminary final which denied North Queensland a fairy tale Grand Final appearance.

=== 2023 ===
In round 2 of the 2023 NRL season, Drinkwater was sent to the sin bin during North Queensland's 28-16 loss against arch-rivals Brisbane after hitting Corey Oates with a shoulder charge which broke the players jaw. Drinkwater was later suspended for three matches. In round 16, Drinkwater scored two tries including the winner during golden point extra-time as North Queensland defeated Penrith 27-23. In round 18, Drinkwater scored two tries in North Queensland's 74-0 victory over the Wests Tigers. Drinkwater played 21 games for North Queensland in 2023 and scored 11 tries as the club finished 11th on the table.

=== 2024 ===
In round 5 of the 2024 NRL season, Drinkwater scored two tries in North Queensland's 35-22 victory over strugglers the Gold Coast. In round 22, he scored two tries in North Queensland's 48-30 win over the Wests Tigers. Drinkwater played 26 games for North Queensland in the 2024 NRL season as they finished 5th on the table. He played in both finals games for North Queensland as they were eliminated in the second week by Cronulla.

=== 2025 ===
Drinkwater played every game for North Queensland in the 2025 NRL season as the club finished 12th on the table.

=== 2026 ===
On 25 April 2026, North Queensland announced that Drinkwater would depart the club at the end of the season and take up a three-year deal with the St. George Illawarra Dragons. Drinkwater played 25 games for North Queensland in the 2026 NRL season as the club finished 8th and qualified for the finals. He played in the clubs elimination final loss to Cronulla.

== Achievements and accolades ==
=== Individual ===
- NRL Nines Player of the Tournament: 2020
- Queensland Cup Team of the Year: 2018
- Cooper Cronk Feeder Club Player of the Year: 2018

=== Team ===
- 2020 NRL Nines: North Queensland Cowboys – Winners

== Statistics ==
=== NRL ===
Season	Team	Matches	T	G	GK %	F/G	Pts
2018	Melbourne	1	1	0	—	0	4
2019	North Queensland	10	3	0	—	0	12
2020	North Queensland	16	2	0	—	0	8
2021	North Queensland	24	5	11		0	42
2022	North Queensland	22	11	4			52
2023	North Queensland	21	11	9		1	63
2024	North Queensland	26	10	7		1	56
2025	North Queensland	24	11	70			184
2026	North Queensland	25	10	31		2	104
2027	St. George Illawarra						
Career totals		169	64	132	80.98	4	525

== Personal life ==
Drinkwater's brother, Josh, is also a professional rugby league footballer, who as of 2025 plays for the Oldham in the RFL Championship.
