= Robert Derby =

PNG international rugby league footballer

Personal information
- Born: 7 March 2002 (age 24) Port Moresby, Papua New Guinea
- Height: 193 cm (6 ft 4 in)
- Weight: 99 kg (15 st 8 lb)

Playing information
- Position: Wing, Centre
Club
| Years | Team | Pld | T | G | FG | P |
|---|---|---|---|---|---|---|
| 2023– | Nth Qld Cowboys | 20 | 9 | 0 | 0 | 36 |
Representative
| Years | Team | Pld | T | G | FG | P |
| 2022–25 | PNG Prime Minister's XIII | 3 | 0 | 0 | 0 | 0 |
| 2022– | Papua New Guinea | 11 | 9 | 0 | 0 | 36 |
- Source: As of 6 November 2026

Robert Derby (born 7 March 2002) is a Papua New Guinean professional rugby league footballer who plays as a winger for the North Queensland Cowboys in the NRL and Papua New Guinea at international level.

== Background ==
Derby was born in Port Moresby, Papua New Guinea, and lived in Mendi, Goroka, Mount Hagen and Vietnam before moving to Cairns when he was eight years old. He lived in Mendi at the Works compound Tente and Magani area.

In 2019, he was signed by the Melbourne Storm and moved to the Sunshine Coast to play for feeder club Sunshine Coast Falcons.

== Playing career ==
In 2020, Derby joined the Sunshine Coast Falcons, playing just one Mal Meninga Cup game before the season was cancelled due to COVID-19.

In 2021, he returned to Cairns, joining the Northern Pride's under-21 side and the North Queensland Cowboys Young Guns squad.

In 2022, Derby spent the season playing for the Pride's Queensland Cup side, scoring seven tries in 16 games. On 25 June 2022, he made his international debut for Papua New Guinea in their 24-14 victory over Fiji.

On 16 November 2022, Derby joined the Cowboys' NRL squad for the 2023 season.

=== 2023 ===
Derby began the season playing for the Townsville Blackhawks in the Queensland Cup. In round 13 of the 2023 NRL season, Derby made his first grade debut against the Parramatta Eels.

=== 2025 ===
On 13 February, the North Queensland club announced that Derby had re-signed with the club until the end of 2028. In round 8 of the 2025 NRL season, Derby scored a hat-trick in North Queensland's 50-18 victory over the Gold Coast. Derby played 17 matches for North Queensland in the 2025 NRL season as the club finished 12th on the table.

On 12 October 2025 he played for the PNG Prime Minister's XIII in the 28-10 defeat to Australia’s Prime Minister's XIII in Port Moresby

On 25 October 2025 he scored two tries in the 40-28 win over Cook Islands in the 2025 Pacific Championship.
