= Tom Dearden =

Australia international rugby league footballer

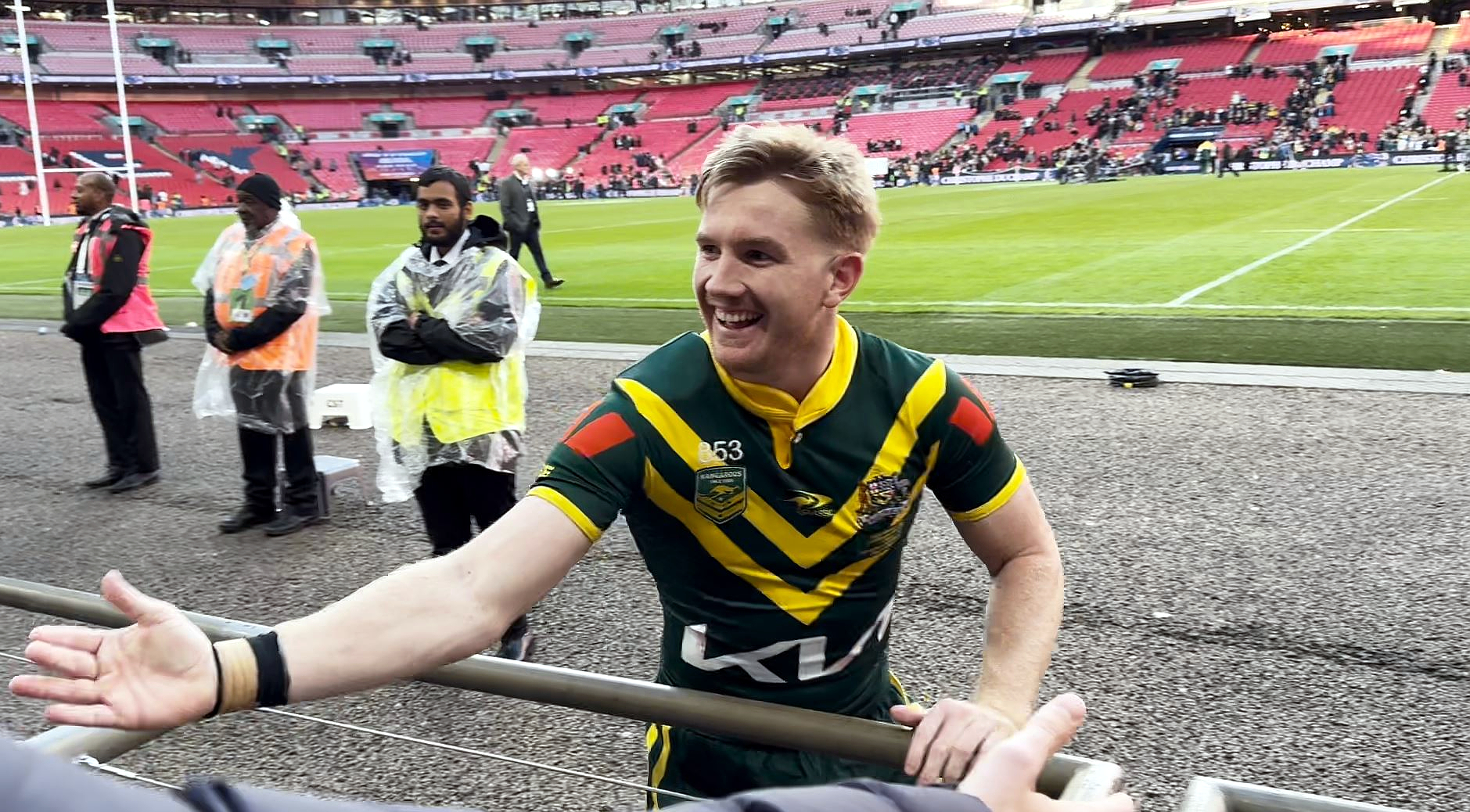

Personal information
- Full name: Thomas Dearden
- Born: 13 March 2001 (age 25) Toowoomba, Queensland, Australia
- Height: 177 cm (5 ft 10 in)
- Weight: 87 kg (13 st 10 lb)

Playing information
- Position: Five-eighth, Halfback
Club
Years	Team	Pld	T	G	FG	P
2019–21	Brisbane Broncos	22	2	0	0	8
2021–	North Qld Cowboys	118	42	0	0	168
	Total	140	44	0	0	176
Representative
Years	Team	Pld	T	G	FG	P
2022–25	Queensland	7	2	0	0	8
2023	Prime Minister's XIII	1	0	0	0	0
2024–	Australia	11	2	0	0	8
- Source: As of 16 November 2026

Thomas Dearden (born 13 March 2001) is an Australian professional rugby league footballer who captains and plays as a five-eighth or halfback for the North Queensland Cowboys in the National Rugby League

He previously played for the Brisbane Broncos. He has played at international level for Australia as a five-eighth. He has played at representative level for Queensland in State of Origin as a five-eighth and in 2025, he won the Wally Lewis Medal, playing as a utility off the bench and halfback, winning man of the match in the series-winning decider. He has also represented the Prime Minister's XIII as a utility.

== Background ==
Dearden was born in Toowoomba, Queensland, Australia. He settled in Mackay and attended Mackay State High School until grade 10. He played junior rugby league for the Brothers Bulldogs Mackay before moving to the Gold Coast, where he played for the Currumbin Eagles and attended Palm Beach Currumbin State High School.

== Career ==
=== Early career ===
In 2016, Dearden played for the Mackay Cutters Cyril Connell Cup side. In 2017, he moved to the Gold Coast to play at the Currumbin Eagles in their undefeated U16 premiership winning side under the guise of ex Melbourne Storm player and now coach Matt Geyer. in the Currumbin U16 side, Dearden played alongside fellow Queensland teammate Xavier Coates and current Catalans Dragons half, Toby Sexton. Dearden represented the Queensland under-16 side.

In 2018, he played for the Tweed Heads Seagulls Mal Meninga Cup side, who made it to the semi-finals of the competition, and later represented the Queensland under-18 team. Later that season, he was a member of Palm Beach Currumbin State High School's ARL Schoolboy Cup winning side, receiving the Peter Sterling Medal for player of the tournament. In November and December 2018, he was a member of the Australian Schoolboys tour of England.

=== 2019 ===
In Round 8 of the 2019 NRL season, Dearden made his NRL debut for the Brisbane Broncos against the South Sydney Rabbitohs.

=== 2020 ===
Dearden made 12 appearances for Brisbane in the 2020 NRL season as the club suffered their worst ever year both on and off the field culminating in the club's first Wooden Spoon.

=== 2021 ===
Dearden began the 2021 season playing for the Souths Logan Magpies in the Queensland Cup, before being recalled into the Brisbane side in Round 3.

On 26 April, he signed a three-year contract with the North Queensland Cowboys, starting in 2022. On 29 May, he secured an immediate release from the Brisbane Broncos to join the North Queensland Cowboys for the remainder of the 2021 NRL season.

Dearden made his North Queensland debut in round 14 against Manly-Warringah in a 50-18 defeat.

In Round 20, Dearden played his first game against his ex club Brisbane Broncos, Dearden scored a try in the 37-18 loss. In round 24, North Queensland defeated St. George Illawarra 38-26. It was Dearden's first win at the club and first win in any NRL match since round 3 when he was at Brisbane, ending 14 losses in a row as a player.

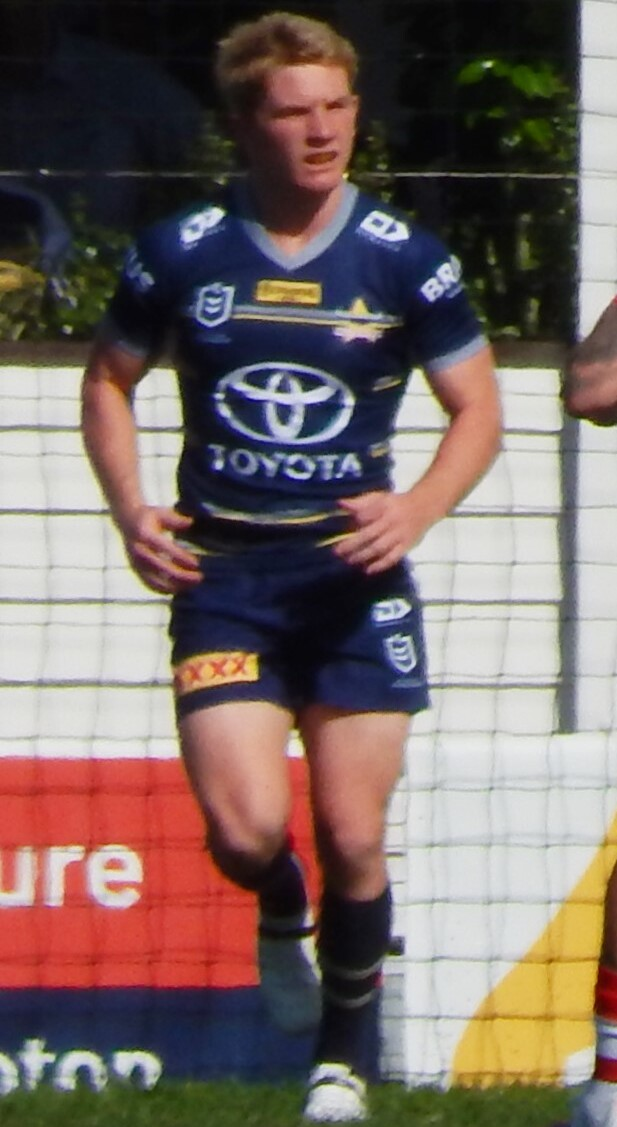
Dearden playing for the Cowboys in 2021

=== 2022 ===
Following a strong start to the season for North Queensland, Dearden was selected in the extended Queensland Maroons squad for Game 1 of State of Origin in Sydney. In Game 2, he was named 18th man before making his debut at Five-Eighth in the decider for Game 3 where Queensland emerged victorious 22-12. Dearden played 23 matches for North Queensland in the 2022 NRL season as the club finished third on the table and qualified for the finals. He played in both finals matches including their preliminary final loss to Parramatta.

=== 2023 ===
In round 11 of the 2023 NRL season, Dearden scored two tries for North Queensland in their 42-22 victory over St. George Illawarra. He was 18th Man for the Queensland Maroons in Game I of the 2023 State of Origin series. Dearden played 23 games for North Queensland in the 2023 NRL season as the club finished 11th on the table. On 19 December, Dearden signed a contract extension to remain at North Queensland until the end of 2029.

=== 2024 ===
In round 11 of the 2024 NRL season, Dearden scored two tries for North Queensland in their 28-22 victory over the bottom placed South Sydney side.

With Cameron Munster injured, Dearden was named as five-eighth for Queensland ahead of game one in the 2024 State of Origin series. Dearden played 24 games for North Queensland in the 2024 NRL season as they finished 5th on the table. Dearden played in both finals games for North Queensland as they were eliminated in the second week by Cronulla. On 2 October, Dearden won the Dally M five-eighth of the year award.

On 18 October, Dearden made his Test debut for Australia, starting at five-eighth and scoring a try in their 18–0 win over Tonga in the Pacific Championships. On 10 November, Dearden was named Player of the Match in Australia's Pacific Championship final win over Tonga.

=== 2025 ===
Dearden was selected to play in the second round of the State of Origin, replacing Queensland captain Daly Cherry-Evans. In the third-round decider, Dearden was named player of the match and won the Wally Lewis Medal. Dearden played 22 games for North Queensland in the 2025 NRL season as the club finished 12th on the table.

=== 2026 ===
Dearden played 14 games for North Queensland in the 2026 NRL season as the club finished 8th and qualified for the finals. He played in the clubs elimination final loss to Cronulla.

== Honours ==
Individual

- Dally M Five-Eighth of the Year: 2024
- Wally Lewis Medal: 2025

Representative

- State of Origin Series: 2022, 2025
- Pacific Championship: 2024
- Ashes: 2025
- Rugby League World Cup: 2026

== Statistics ==
Year	Team	Games	Tries	Pts
2019	Brisbane Broncos	5		
2020	Brisbane Broncos	12	1	4
2021	Brisbane Broncos	5	1	4
2021	North Queensland Cowboys	12	6	24
2022	North Queensland Cowboys	23	9	36
2023	North Queensland Cowboys	23	7	28
2024	North Queensland Cowboys	24	9	36
2025	North Queensland Cowboys	22	9	36
2026	North Queensland Cowboys	10	1	4
2027	North Queensland Cowboys			
	Totals	136	43	172
