= Heilum Luki =

Samoa international rugby league player

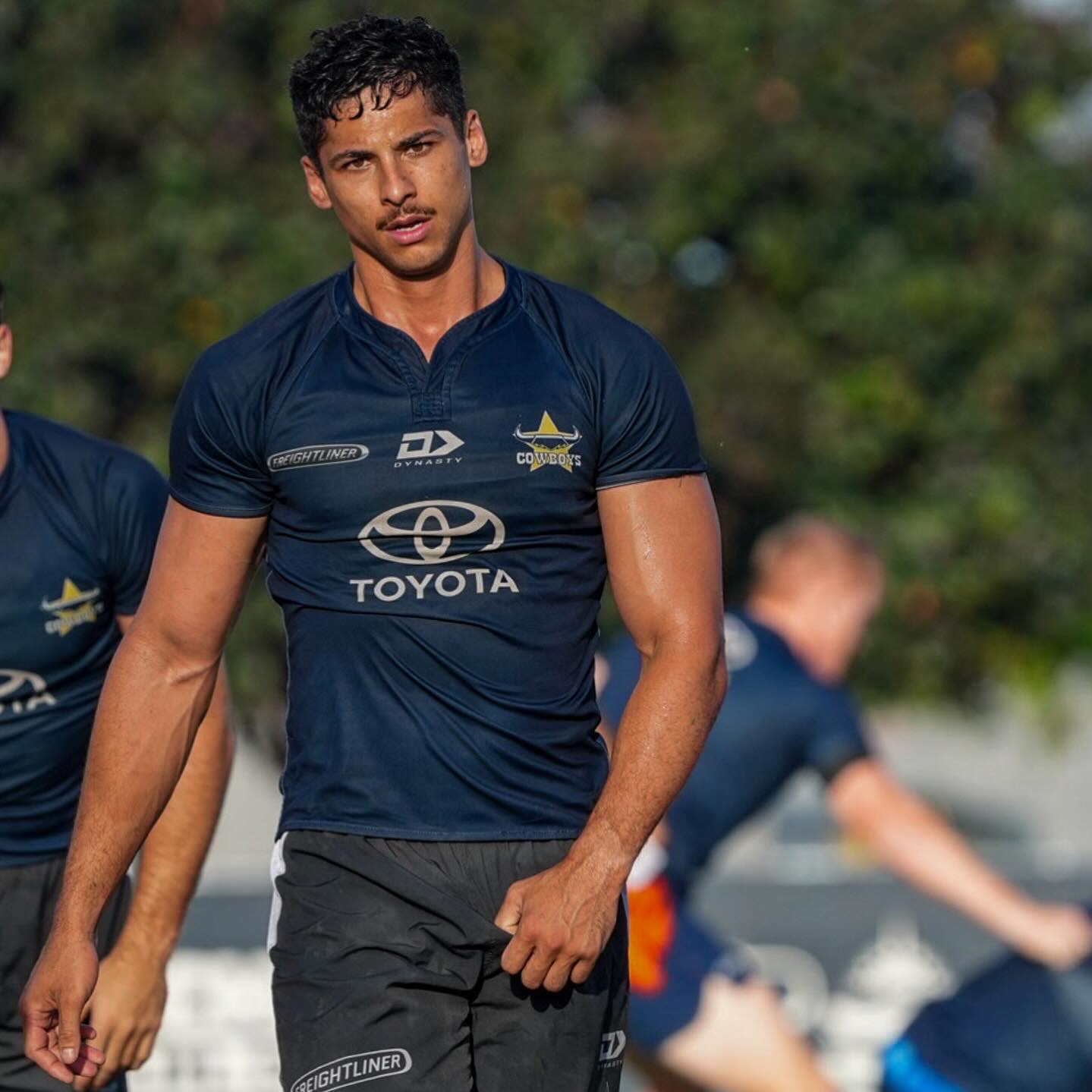

Personal information
- Born: 11 April 2001 (age 25) Cairns, Queensland, Australia
- Height: 195 cm (6 ft 5 in)
- Weight: 103 kg (16 st 3 lb)

Playing information
- Position: Second-row
Club
Years	Team	Pld	T	G	FG	P
2021–	North Queensland Cowboys	82	26	0	0	104
Representative
Years	Team	Pld	T	G	FG	P
2023	Samoa	2	0	0	0	0
- Source: As of 9 November 2026

Heilum Luki (born 11 April 2001) is a Samoa international rugby league footballer who plays as a second-row forward for the North Queensland Cowboys in the NRL.

== Background ==
Born in Cairns, Queensland, Luki is of Niuean and Samoan descent and played his junior rugby league for the Cairns Brothers.

He attended Cairns State High School before being signed by the North Queensland Cowboys.

== Playing career ==
=== Early career ===
In 2017, Luki represented the Niue under-16 team at the Pasifika Youth Cup in New Zealand.

In 2018 and 2019, Luki played for the Northern Pride in the Mal Meninga Cup. In 2019, he moved up to the Pride's Hastings Deering Colts under-20 side. In June 2019, he played for the North Queensland under-18 side in an exhibition game against the Gold Coast under-18s, being named man of the match in North Queensland's 14–6 win.

On 7 October 2020, Luki signed a development contract with the North Queensland club, joining their NRL squad.

=== 2021 ===
Luki began the 2021 NRL season playing for the Pride in the Queensland Cup. In round 11 of the 2021 NRL season, Luki made his NRL debut against Newcastle, scoring a try in North Queensland's 36–20 win.

=== 2022 ===
Luki played 14 matches for North Queensland in the 2022 NRL season as the club finished third on the table and qualified for the finals. Luki was ruled out for the season following North Queensland’s 31-12 victory over the St George Illawarra Dragons after it was revealed he had torn his ACL. Luki did not feature in the finals series which saw North Queensland lose to Parramatta in the preliminary final.

=== 2023 ===
In round 11 of the 2023 NRL season, Luki scored two tries for North Queensland in their 42-22 victory over St. George Illawarra. Luki played 13 games for North Queensland in the 2023 NRL season as the club finished 11th on the table.

=== 2024 ===
In round 20 of the 2024 NRL season, Luki scored two tries for North Queensland in their 20-18 victory over Canterbury. Luki played 19 games for North Queensland in the 2024 NRL season as they finished 5th on the table. Luki played in both finals games for North Queensland as they were eliminated in the second week by Cronulla. On 21 December, Luki tore his ACL during a morning training session with the Cowboys, he was ruled out for the entire 2025 season.

=== 2026 ===
Luki played 25 matches for North Queensland in the 2026 NRL season as the club finished 8th and qualified for the finals. He played in the clubs elimination final loss to Cronulla.

== Statistics ==
Year	Team	Games	Tries	Pts
2021	North Queensland Cowboys	11	3	12
2022	North Queensland Cowboys	14	4	16
2023	North Queensland Cowboys	13	3	12
2024	North Queensland Cowboys	19	5	20
2026	North Queensland Cowboys	9	4	16
2027	North Queensland Cowboys			
	Totals	66	19	76
