= 2025 North Queensland Cowboys season =

Season of rugby league team

- NRL Rank: 12th
- 2025 record: Wins: 9; draws: 1; losses: 14
- Points scored: For: 538; against: 684

Team information
- CEO: Jeff Reibel
- Coach: Todd Payten
- Captain: Reuben Cotter Tom Dearden
- Stadium: Queensland Country Bank Stadium
- Avg. attendance: 18,649
- High attendance: 22,903 (vs. Brisbane, Rd 26)

Top scorers
- Tries: Jaxon Purdue(14)
- Goals: Scott Drinkwater (70)
- Points: Scott Drinkwater (184)
← 2024	2026 →

The 2025 North Queensland Cowboys season was the 31st in the club's history. Coached by Todd Payten and captained by Reuben Cotter and Tom Dearden, they competed in the NRL's 2025 Telstra Premiership.

The club celebrated its 30th anniversary during the season, missing out on the finals for the third time in Payten's five years in charge.

== Season summary ==
=== Milestones ===
- Round 1: Tom Duffy made his NRL debut.
- Round 1: John Bateman and Karl Lawton made their debuts for the club.
- Round 2: Kai O'Donnell made his debut for the club.
- Round 3: Murray Taulagi scored his 50th NRL try.
- Round 4: Robert Derby scored his first NRL try.
- Round 8: Murray Taulagi played his 100th NRL game for the club.
- Round 13: Jaxson Paulo made his debut for the club.
- Round 13: Jaxson Paulo and John Bateman scored their first tries for the club.
- Round 15: Kaiden Lahrs made his NRL debut.
- Round 15: Jordan McLean played his 150 NRL game for the club.
- Round 18: Temple Kalepo made his NRL debut.
- Round 18: Scott Drinkwater scored his 50th NRL try.
- Round 22: Marly Bitungane made his NRL debut.
- Round 23: Nic Lenaz made his NRL debut.
- Round 26: Reuben Cotter played his 100th NRL game for the club.

=== Squad ===
North Queensland Cowboys 2025 squad
Top 30 squad – 2025 NRL season			Development list	Coaching staff
John Bateman – SR; Braidon Burns – WG; Tom Chester – CE; Jake Clifford – HB, FE; Reuben Cotter (c) – LK; Tom Dearden (c) – FE; Robert Derby – WG; Scott Drinkwater – FB; Tom Duffy – HB; Harrison Edwards – HK, PR, LK	Coen Hess – PR, SR; Kaiden Lahrs – PR; Karl Lawton – HK, SR; Zac Laybutt – CE; Heilum Luki – SR; Sam McIntyre – PR; Jordan McLean – PR; Thomas Mikaele – LK, PR; Jeremiah Nanai – SR; Griffin Neame – PR	Kai O'Donnell – SR; Jaxson Paulo – WG, CE; Jaxon Purdue – CE; Reece Robson – HK; Jamal Shibasaki – SR, PR; Murray Taulagi – WG; Jason Taumalolo – PR, LK; Viliami Vailea – CE; Semi Valemei – WG	Marly Bitungane – PR; Zac Herdegen – HB; Mason Kira – LK; Extended squad: Temple Kalepo – HK; Xavier Kerrisk – HK; Nic Lenaz – LK, HK; Jeremiah Matautia – SR; Henry Teutau – PR; Matthew Watts – PR	Head coach: Todd Payten; Assistant coaches: Justin Morgan; Ben Rauter; Steve Sheppard; Brett O'Farrell; Paul Bowman (Head of Performance); Dan Grange (Head of Strength); Ashley Graham (Strength & Conditioning); Steve Sartori (Head Physiotherapist); Mitch Pemberton (Sports Scientist); Legend: (c) Captain(s); (vc) Vice-captain(s); Supplementary list; Extended squad; Train and trial; Updated: 21 May 2026; Source(s): NQ Cowboys

== Squad movement ==
=== Gains ===
Player	Signed from	Until end of	Notes
John Bateman	Wests Tigers	2026	
Zac Herdegen	Redcliffe Dolphins	2025	
Temple Kalepo	Mackay Cutters (mid-season)	2025	
Karl Lawton	Manly Sea Eagles	2026	
Nic Lenaz	Manly Sea Eagles	2025	
Kai O'Donnell	Leigh Leopards	2026	
Jaxson Paulo	Manly Sea Eagles	2026	

=== Losses ===
Player	Signed to	Until end of	Notes
Jodeci Baker-Tiraha	Brisbane Tigers	2025	
Mutua Brown	Canberra Raiders (mid-season)	2026	
Kyle Feldt	St Helens	2026	
Kulikefu Finefeuiaki	Dolphins	2027	
Jake Granville	Retired	–	
Jai Hansen	CQ Capras	2025	
Valentine Holmes	St George Illawarra	2027	
D'Jazirhae Pua'avase	Manly Sea Eagles	2025	
Wil Sullivan	Newcastle Knights (mid-season)	2028	
Jamayne Taunoa-Brown	Retired	–	
Chad Townsend	Sydney Roosters	2025	

=== Re-signings ===
Player	Until End of	Notes
Tom Chester	2026	
Robert Derby	2028	
Zac Laybutt	2027	
Viliami Vailea	2027	

== Ladder ==
Pos	Team	Pld	W	D	L	B	PF	PA	PD	Pts	Qualification
1	Canberra Raiders	24	19	0	5	3	654	506	+148	44	Advance to finals series
2	Melbourne Storm	24	17	0	7	3	671	459	+212	40	Advance to finals series
3	Canterbury-Bankstown Bulldogs	24	16	0	8	3	534	414	+120	38	Advance to finals series
4	Brisbane Broncos (P)	24	15	0	9	3	680	508	+172	36	Advance to finals series
5	Cronulla-Sutherland Sharks	24	15	0	9	3	599	490	+109	36	Advance to finals series
6	New Zealand Warriors	24	14	0	10	3	517	496	+21	34	Advance to finals series
7	Penrith Panthers	24	13	1	10	3	576	469	+107	33	Advance to finals series
8	Sydney Roosters	24	13	0	11	3	653	521	+132	32	Advance to finals series
9	Dolphins	24	12	0	12	3	721	596	+125	30	
10	Manly Warringah Sea Eagles	24	12	0	12	3	555	534	+21	30	
11	Parramatta Eels	24	10	0	14	3	502	578	−76	26	
12	North Queensland Cowboys	24	9	1	14	3	538	684	−146	25	
13	Wests Tigers	24	9	0	15	3	477	612	−135	24	
14	South Sydney Rabbitohs	24	9	0	15	3	427	608	−181	24	
15	St. George Illawarra Dragons	24	8	0	16	3	498	628	−130	22	
16	Gold Coast Titans	24	6	0	18	3	520	719	−199	18	
17	Newcastle Knights	24	6	0	18	3	338	638	−300	18	

Source: National Rugby League
(P) Premiers

== Fixtures ==
=== Pre-season ===
Date	Round	Opponent	Venue	Score	Tries	Goals	Attendance
Friday, 14 February	Trial 1	Dolphins	Barlow Park	8 – 50	Derby, Subloo	Rivett (0/1), Subloo (0/1)	6,936
Sunday, 23 February	Trial 2	Melbourne Storm	Casey Fields	36 – 24	Drinkwater (2), Burns, Dearden, Paulo, Purdue, Vailea	Duffy (3/4), Drinkwater (1/3)	6,000
Legend: Win Loss Draw Bye

=== Regular season ===
==== Matches ====
Date	Round	Opponent	Venue	Score	Tries	Goals	Attendance
Saturday, 8 March	Round 1	Manly Warringah Sea Eagles	4 Pines Park	12 – 42	Drinkwater, Burns	Duffy (1/1), Drinkwater (1/1)	17,335
Saturday, 15 March	Round 2	Cronulla-Sutherland Sharks	QCB Stadium	12 – 36	Purdue, Drinkwater	Drinkwater (2/2)	18,714
Friday, 21 March	Round 3	Brisbane Broncos	Suncorp Stadium	16 – 26	Neame, Taulagi, Purdue	Drinkwater (2/3)	45,317
Saturday, 29 March	Round 4	Canberra Raiders	QCB Stadium	30 – 20	Taulagi, Clifford (2), Derby, Dearden	Drinkwater (4/5)	15,897
Friday, 4 April	Round 5	Penrith Panthers	CommBank Stadium	22 – 18	Taulagi (2), Vailea, Purdue	Drinkwater (3/4)	10,320
Saturday, 12 April	Round 6	South Sydney Rabbitohs	Optus Stadium	24 – 16	Taulagi, McIntyre, Purdue (2)	Drinkwater (2/4, 2 PG)	31,347
	Round 7	Bye					
Saturday, 26 April	Round 8	Gold Coast Titans	QCB Stadium	50 – 18	Clifford, Nanai (2), Derby (3), Purdue, Robson, Taulagi	Drinkwater (6/8), Taulagi (1/1)	20,489
Saturday, 3 May	Round 9	New Zealand Warriors	Suncorp Stadium	26 – 30	Purdue, Dearden, Derby, Taulagi, Nanai	Drinkwater (3/5)	49,512
Saturday, 10 May	Round 10	Penrith Panthers	QCB Stadium	30 – 30	Nanai, Vailea, Clifford, Derby, Dearden	Drinkwater (5/5)	19,324
Saturday, 17 May	Round 11	Manly Warringah Sea Eagles	QCB Stadium	6 – 24	Derby	Drinkwater (1/2)	18,965
	Round 12	Bye					
Saturday, 31 May	Round 13	Wests Tigers	QCB Stadium	32 – 28	Bateman, Dearden, Drinkwater, Nanai, Paulo, Purdue	Drinkwater (4/6), Laybutt (0/1)	17,470
Friday, 6 June	Round 14	Melbourne Storm	AAMI Park	14 – 38	Derby, Drinkwater, Paulo	Drinkwater (1/3)	19,096
Saturday, 14 June	Round 15	Dolphins	QCB Stadium	4 – 58	Taulagi	Drinkwater (0/1)	18,343
Sunday, 22 June	Round 16	Sydney Roosters	Allianz Stadium	8 – 42	Burns, Taulagi	Drinkwater (0/1), Duffy (0/1)	21,143
Sunday, 29 June	Round 17	Gold Coast Titans	Cbus Super Stadium	30 – 24	Drinkwater (2), Laybutt, Nanai, Taulagi	Clifford (3/3), Drinkwater (2/2)	13,882
Saturday, 5 July	Round 18	Melbourne Storm	QCB Stadium	20 – 26	Derby, Drinkwater, Purdue	Drinkwater (3/3), Clifford (1/1)	20,383
Saturday, 12 July	Round 19	Canterbury-Bankstown Bulldogs	QCB Stadium	8 – 12	Laybutt	Drinkwater (2/2)	18,778
Thursday, 17 July	Round 20	Dolphins	Suncorp Stadium	24 – 43	Taulagi (2), Dearden, Drinkwater	Drinkwater (4/4)	23,172
Friday, 25 July	Round 21	St George Illawarra Dragons	QCB Stadium	38 – 32	Dearden (2), Drinkwater, Hess, Laybutt, Nanai, Purdue	Drinkwater (5/8)	16,020
Sunday, 3 August	Round 22	Cronulla-Sutherland Sharks	Sharks Stadium	12 – 32	Burns, Neame	Laybutt (2/2)	6,321
Sunday, 10 August	Round 23	Parramatta Eels	CommBank Stadium	18 – 19	Purdue (2), Burns	Laybutt (3/4)	11,562
Sunday, 17 August	Round 24	Newcastle Knights	QCB Stadium	38 – 4	Drinkwater (2), Burns, Dearden, Nanai, Purdue	Drinkwater (7/7)	16,640
Sunday, 24 August	Round 25	Wests Tigers	Leichhardt Oval	34 – 28	Valemei (2), Burns, Dearden, Nanai, Purdue	Drinkwater (5/6)	16,055
Saturday, 30 August	Round 26	Brisbane Broncos	QCB Stadium	30 – 38	Valemei (2), Burns, Clifford, Robson	Drinkwater (5/5)	22,903
	Round 27	Bye					
Legend: Win Loss Draw Bye

== Statistics ==
Name	App	T	G	FG	Pts
John Bateman	19	1	-	-	4
Marly Bitungane	2	-	-	-	-
Braidon Burns	13	7	-	-	28
Jake Clifford	14	5	4	-	28
Reuben Cotter	18	-	-	-	-
Tom Dearden	22	9	-	-	36
Robert Derby	17	9	-	-	36
Scott Drinkwater	24	11	70	-	184
Tom Duffy	6	-	1	-	2
Harrison Edwards	21	-	-	-	-
Coen Hess	21	1	-	-	4
Temple Kalepo	1	-	-	-	-
Kaiden Lahrs	7	-	-	-	-
Karl Lawton	11	-	-	-	-
Zac Laybutt	14	3	5	-	22
Nic Lenaz	1	-	-	-	-
Sam McIntyre	16	1	-	-	4
Jordan McLean	19	-	-	-	-
Thomas Mikaele	10	-	-	-	-
Jeremiah Nanai	21	9	-	-	36
Griffin Neame	20	2	-	-	8
Kai O'Donnell	18	-	-	-	-
Jaxson Paulo	3	2	-	-	8
Jaxon Purdue	24	14	-	-	56
Reece Robson	21	2	-	-	8
Jamal Shibasaki	1	-	-	-	-
Murray Taulagi	15	12	1	-	50
Jason Taumalolo	10	-	-	-	-
Viliami Vailea	14	2	-	-	8
Semi Valemei	4	4	-	-	16
Totals		94	81	-	538

== Representatives ==
The following players played a representative match in 2025.

	State of Origin 1	State of Origin 2	State of Origin 3	Prime Minister's XIII	Ashes Tour	Pacific Championships	End of Year Tests
Reuben Cotter	Queensland	Queensland	Queensland	–	Australia	–	–
Tom Dearden	Queensland	Queensland	Queensland	–	Australia	–	–
Robert Derby	–	–	–	Papua New Guinea	–	–	–
Harrison Edwards	–	–	–	Australia	–	–	–
Nic Lenaz	–	–	–	–	–	–	Italy
Jeremiah Nanai	Queensland	Queensland	Queensland	–	–	Samoa	–
Reece Robson	New South Wales	New South Wales	New South Wales	–	–	–	–
Jason Taumalolo	–	–	–	–	–	Tonga	–
Murray Taulagi	–	–	–	–	–	Samoa	–
Semi Valemei	–	–	–	–	–	Fiji	–

== Honours ==
=== Club ===
- Paul Bowman Medal: Tom Dearden
- Players' Player: Tom Dearden
- The Cowboys Way Award: Tom Chester & Heilum Luki
- Rookie of the Year: Robert Derby
- JCU Education Award: Tom Duffy
- Affiliate Player of the Year: Marly Bitungane
- Club Person of the Year: Braidon Burns
- Townsville Bulletin Fan Award: Tom Dearden

== Feeder clubs ==
=== Queensland Cup ===
- Mackay Cutters – 12th, missed finals
- Northern Pride – 14th, missed finals
