= 2023 State of Origin series =

Australian rugby league series

- Won by: Queensland (24th title)
- Series margin: 2–1
- Points scored: 116
- Attendance: 176,388 (ave. 58,796 per match)
- Player of the series: Reuben Cotter (Wally Lewis Medal)
- Top points scorer(s): Valentine Holmes (24)
- Top try scorer(s): Hamiso Tabuai-Fidow (4)

The 2023 State of Origin series was the 42nd annual best-of-three series between the Queensland and New South Wales rugby league teams. Before this series, Queensland had won 23 times, NSW 16 times, with two series drawn.

== Venues ==
Game I was held in Adelaide at the Adelaide Oval, game II in Brisbane at the Suncorp Stadium, and game III in Sydney at Accor Stadium.

The series returned to Adelaide for a second time, after the Adelaide Oval hosted the first match of the 2020 State of Origin series.

== Game I ==
Game I was held at Adelaide Oval in Adelaide.

The return of blues centre Latrell Mitchell was pushed back due to Mitchell suffering a calf injury. Stephen Crichton replaced him at starting left centre, and Matt Burton was added into the Game I extended bench.

Wednesday, 31 May
19:35 ACST (UTC+9:30)

Queensland	26–18	New South Wales
Tries: 5 Tabuai-Fidow 7', 73'; Cobbo 10', 56'; Munster 76'; Goals: 3 Holmes 9', 58', 74' (3/5); Sin Bin: Flegler (yellow card) 68' to 78'	1st: 10–6; 2nd: 16–12; Report	Tries: 3 Martin 31'; Koroisau 43'; Crichton 66'; Goals: 3 Cleary 32', 45', 67' (3/3)

Adelaide Oval, Adelaide
Attendance: 48,613
Referee: Ashley Klein
Bunker: Grant Atkins
Touch judges: Phil Henderson, Drew Oultram
Player of the Match: Reuben Cotter

New South Wales entered the game as slight favourites, however any hopes of an easy win were vaporised early when Hamiso Tabuai-Fidow and Selwyn Cobbo crossed for Queensland in the 7th and 10th minutes respectively, giving the Maroons an early 10-0 lead.

Despite enjoying 56% possession and 74% territory in the first half, the Blues could only manage one try as they went into the sheds down 10-6. The try came when maligned five-eighth Jarome Luai threw a perfect pass for club teammate and second rower Liam Martin to burst through a hole and plant the ball down.

It was a dream start to the second half for New South Wales, with Maroons centre Valentine Holmes forcing an offload that was picked up by Blues hooker Api Koroisau, who streaked away to give his side the lead for the first time in the match.

It lasted until the 56th minute, when Cobbo went in for his second try, beating defenders Luai and James Tedesco in the process.

The game was clearly in the balance, and it looked as if the Blues would cruise home when Stephen Crichton's try in the 66th minute was followed by a sin-bin to Maroons forward Tom Flegler in the 68th minute for a dangerous tackle on Tom Trbojevic, meaning New South Wales would play the bulk of the final minutes against 12 men while already possessing a two-point lead.

Add to that, the Maroons would finish the game with both wingers off the field due to injury, with Cobbo going off in the 67th minute and Murray Taulagi in the 72nd. The Blues would also be forced into a late backline change, with Trbojevic off with an HIA in the 68th minute, replaced by Nicho Hynes.

Despite all the adversity, it would be the Maroons who romped home to take the win in the end, with Cameron Munster beating Hynes to set up Tabuai-Fidow for his second try in the 73rd minute. Queensland would seal it a few minutes later, with prop forward Lindsay Collins sensationally leaping over Blues fullback and Roosters team-mate Tedesco to catch the ball and offload to Munster, who scored the try.

Queensland forward Reuben Cotter was named man of the match, playing 80 minutes and finishing with the stats of 10 runs for 84 metres, a tackle break and 48 tackles with only 3 misses.

== Game II ==
Game II was held at Suncorp Stadium in Brisbane.

Wednesday, 21 June
20:05 AEST (UTC+10:00)

Queensland	32–6	New South Wales
Tries: 6 Holmes 8', 42'; Taulagi 33'; Tabuai-Fidow 50'; Coates 64'; Nanai 73'; Goals: 4 Holmes 34', 44', 65', 75' (4/6); Sent Off: Walsh (red card) 79'	1st: 10–0; 2nd: 22–6; Report	Tries: 1 Cook 57'; Goals: 1 Crichton 57' (1/1); Sin Bin: Addo-Carr (yellow card) 79' to 80'; Sent Off: Luai (red card) 79'

Suncorp Stadium, Brisbane
Attendance: 52,433
Referee: Ashley Klein
Bunker: Grant Atkins
Touch judges: Drew Oultram, Dave Munro
Player of the Match: Lindsay Collins

== Game III ==
Game III was held at Accor Stadium in Sydney.

Wednesday, 12 July
20:05 AEST (UTC+10:00)

New South Wales	24–10	Queensland
Tries: 4 To'o 14'; Addo-Carr 20'; Best 23', 64'; Goals: 4 Crichton 18 (pen)', 24', 39 (pen)', 66' (4/6)	1st: 18–10; 2nd: 6–0; Report	Tries: 2 Fifita 11'; Tabuai-Fidow 35'; Goals: 1 Holmes 12' (1/2)

Accor Stadium, Sydney
Attendance: 75,342
Referee: Ashley Klein
Bunker: Grant Atkins
Touch judges: Phil Henderson, Dave Munro
Player of the Match: Cody Walker

== Teams ==
=== New South Wales Blues ===
Position	Game 1	Game 2	Game 3
Fullback	James Tedesco (c)		
Wing	Brian To'o		
Centre	Stephen Crichton		
Centre	Tom Trbojevic		Bradman Best
Wing	Josh Addo-Carr		
Five-eighth	Jarome Luai		Cody Walker
Halfback	Nathan Cleary	Mitchell Moses	
Prop	Tevita Pangai Junior	Junior Paulo	Jake Trbojevic
Hooker	Apisai Koroisau	Reece Robson	Damien Cook
Prop	Payne Haas		Reagan Campbell-Gillard
Second row	Tyson Frizell		Liam Martin
Second row	Hudson Young		Keaon Koloamatangi
Lock	Isaah Yeo		Cameron Murray
Interchange	Junior Paulo	Stefano Utoikamanu	Isaah Yeo
Interchange	Cameron Murray		Jacob Saifiti
Interchange	Liam Martin		Reece Robson
Interchange	Nicho Hynes	Damien Cook	Clinton Gutherson
Replacement	Matt Burton		Scott Drinkwater
Reserve	Stefano Utoikamanu	Keaon Koloamatangi	Spencer Leniu
Coach	Brad Fittler		

=== Queensland Maroons ===
Position	Game 1	Game 2	Game 3
Fullback	Reece Walsh		Alexander Brimson
Wing	Selwyn Cobbo	Xavier Coates	
Centre	Valentine Holmes		
Centre	Hamiso Tabuai-Fidow		
Wing	Murray Taulagi		
Five-eighth	Cameron Munster		
Halfback	Daly Cherry-Evans (c)		
Prop	Tino Fa'asuamaleaui		
Hooker	Ben Hunt		Harry Grant
Prop	Reuben Cotter	Thomas Flegler	Reuben Cotter
Second row	David Fifita		
Second row	Tom Gilbert	Reuben Cotter	Jeremiah Nanai
Lock	Patrick Carrigan		
Interchange	Harry Grant		Ben Hunt
Interchange	Thomas Flegler	Jeremiah Nanai	Corey Horsburgh
Interchange	Lindsay Collins		
Interchange	Jai Arrow	Moeaki Fotuaika	
Replacement	Tom Dearden	Alexander Brimson	Tom Dearden
Reserve	Christian Welch	Corey Horsburgh	J'maine Hopgood
Coach	Billy Slater		

=== Debutants ===
Game I

- Cap no. 304, Tevita Pangai Junior
- Cap no. 305, Hudson Young
- Cap no. 306, Nicholas Hynes
- Cap no. 229, Reece Walsh

Game II

- Cap no. 307, Stefano Utoikamanu
- Cap no. 308, Reece Robson

Game III

- Cap no. 309, Bradman Best
- Cap no. 310, Keaon Koloamatangi
- Cap no. 230, Corey Horsburgh

== Men's Under 19 State of Origin ==
Thursday, 13 July 2023
7.45pm (AEST)

Queensland	14 – 32	New South Wales
Tries: 3 Timothy Sielaff-Burns 20'; Wil Sullivan 22'; Caleb Jackson 36'; Goals: 1 Timothy Sielaff-Burns 23'; Sin Bin: Mitchell Jennings (yellow card) 8' to 18'	HT 10–14; Report	Tries: 6 Strange 1', 40', 64'; Ferguson 13'; Sanders 32'; Tamale 45'; Goals: 4 Ferguson 4 34', 42', 47', 66'

Kayo Stadium, Brisbane
Attendance: 4,764
Referee: Darian Furner
Bunker: Kasey Badger
Touch judges: Dan Munroe, Clayton Wills
Player of the Match: Strange

Team details

FB	1	Mutua Brown
WG	2	Israel Leota
CE	3	Caleb Jackson
CE	4	Mitchell Jennings
WG	5	Timothy Sielaff-Burns
FE	6	Stanley Huen
HB	7	Zack Lamont
PR	8	Ryan Jackson
HK	9	Blake Mozer
PR	10	Ben Te Kura
SR	11	Angus Hinchey
SR	12	Wil Sullivan
LF	13	Damon Marshall
Interchange:
IN	14	Gabriel Satrick
IN	15	Christopher Faagutu
IN	16	Michael Waqa
IN	17	Jamal Shibasaki
CS	19	Kai Simon
Coach: Kurt Richards

FB	1	Chevy Stewart
WG	2	Savelio Tamale
CE	3	Ethan Strange
CE	4	Josh Feledy
WG	5	Ethan Ferguson
FE	6	Latu Fainu
HB	7	Ethan Sanders
PR	8	Jake Clydsdale
HK	9	Billy Scott
PR	10	Samuela Fainu
SR	11	Charlie Guymer
SR	12	Harrison Hassett
LK	13	Myles Martin
Interchange:
IN	14	Joash Papalii
IN	15	Nicholas Tsougranis
IN	16	Sam Tuivaiti
IN	17	Luron Patea
CS	18	Kyle McCarthy
Coach: Andrew Ryan

Touch judges: Cameron Paddy and Nick Pelgrave

== Women's State of Origin ==
The 2023 Women's State of Origin title was contested as a two-game series. Queensland won the first game 18–10 at Commbank Stadium, Sydney, and New South Wales won the second game 18–14 at Queensland Country Bank Stadium, Townsville. With the teams winning a game each Queensland were crowned champions due to a superior points aggregate. The under-19s game was won 20–14 by Queensland at Kayo Stadium, Brisbane.

== Wheelchair State Challenge ==
Saturday, 8 July 2023

Queensland	42 – 26	New South Wales
Tries: 7 A Tannock 3 S Harre 2 J Hill 1 B McKenna 1 Goals: 7 B McKenna 4 J Hill 3	1st: 24 – 4; 2nd: 18 – 22; Report	Tries: 5; 2 B Grove; 1 C O'Brien; 1 C Cannane; 1 D Karim; Goals: 3; 2 B Henman; 1 D Karim

Whitlam Leisure Centre, Liverpool
Player of the Match: Adam Tannock

== See also ==
- 2023 NRL season
