= 2025 Kangaroo tour of England =

Rugby league tour by Australia

2025 Kangaroo tour
- Date: 15 October – 8 November 2025
- Coach(es): Kevin Walters (head coach); Willie Peters (assistant)
- Tour captain(s): Isaah Yeo
- Top point scorer(s): Nathan Cleary (26)
- Top try scorer(s): Reece Walsh (4)
Summary
P	W	D	L
Total
3	3	0	0
Test match
3	3	0	0
Opponent
P	W	D	L
England
3	3	0	0

Tour chronology
- Previous tour: 2020 (cancelled)

The 2025 Kangaroo tour of England was a tour by the Australia national rugby league team, in which the 2025 Ashes Series (branded as the ABK Beer Ashes Series for sponsorship reasons) was contested. The tour followed the conclusions of the domestic seasons in the UK and Australia.

The tour was originally scheduled to be a tour of Australia by England. However, in October 2024, talks began regarding moving the tour to England, thus making Australia the tourists.

The tour marked the first time the men's rugby league Ashes was contested since 2003.

The tour had also planned to stop in France, but this did not occur.

== Background ==
=== New international calendar ===
Following France withdrawing as host and the subsequent cancellation of the 2025 Rugby League World Cup, the International Rugby League saw need to revamp the international calendar. The confirmation of the replacement 2026 Rugby League World Cup came with a selection of new and returning international rugby league competitions and tours between 2025 and 2030, including the return of The Ashes. The tournament return was to begin with England's 2025 tour of Australia, which was also scheduled to see the inaugural women's Ashes, and Australia's 2028 tour of England. The 2025 Ashes was the first since the 2003 Kangaroo tour of Great Britain and France.

Previous Ashes revivals had been planned for 2020 and 2024, but were cancelled due to the COVID-19 pandemic and the aforementioned change to the international calendar as a result of the postponed World Cup.

Ahead of the tournament, The Guardian credited a successful 2021 World Cup as the catalyst for the new international calendar.

=== Great Britain or England ===
Great Britain were Australia's traditional Ashes opponents, having played against each other from 1908 to 2003. The Great Britain side had begun to disband starting with the 1995 Rugby League World Cup in favour of the four home nations playing as individual teams. This process was completed with the 2007 All Golds Tour, the centenary of the first ever international tour.

In 2024, the Rugby Football League (RFL) considered the return of the Great Britain team for the 2025 tour, and possibly all future away tours, with the hope that the return of a traditional sporting brand would help connect more people to the team. However, in September of that year, the governing body confirmed during the new England kit launch that England would continue the 2025 tour as planned. A fan poll was conducted in regards to this subject.

=== Host change ===
On 28 October 2024, the Australian Rugby League Commission announced talks were underway between themselves and Rugby League Commercial (a branch of the Rugby Football League) regarding the games being moved to England, with stadiums in Lancashire, Yorkshire, and London being considered for the venues. BBC Sport attributed the host change to Australia now hosting the 2026 Rugby League World Cup, originally to be hosted by France in 2025.

=== Teams ===
IRL Men's World Rankings
Official rankings as of December 2024
Rank	Change	Team	Pts %
1	Steady	Australia	100
3	Steady	England	84

Upon the announcement of the tour, Australia were the best ranked team in the world with England ranked third.

Australia had played England / Great Britain 162 times previously, winning 88, drawing 7, and losing 67.

The original Ashes ended in 2003 with 20 series wins to Australia and 19 to Great Britain. However 13 of the Australian wins came consecutively in the final 13 series, leaving Great Britain without an Ashes victory since 1970.

== Venues ==
Before confirmation of a change of host, it was known Rugby League Commercial were looking to stage the three tests in Lancashire, London, and Yorkshire. For the Lancashire venue, Wigan Warriors's Brick Community Stadium was reported as one of the favourites along with Everton's Bramley-Moore Dock Stadium. In London, Wembley Stadium and the Tottenham Hotspur Stadium were reporting as being the front runners. Finally, Leeds United's Elland Road and Hull FC's MKM Stadium were reported as the likely venues for the Yorkshire match.

On 3 March 2025, it was reported that Wembley Stadium, Bramley-Moore Dock Stadium and Headingley Rugby Stadium would be the test venues with the RFL being close to confirming the change in host. These venues were confirmed by the RFL on 26 March upon the official announcement of the change of host.

London	Liverpool	Leeds
Wembley Stadium	Hill Dickinson Stadium	Headingley Stadium
Capacity: 90,000	Capacity: 52,769	Capacity: 19,700

=== Headingley criticism ===
Criticism was made by fans in regards to Headingley's inclusion as a host venue, stating that the size of the ground showed lack of ambition from the RFL. The RFL stated that the larger Elland Road, also in Leeds (37,645 capacity), was under consideration; however, unspecified logistical challenges prevented its inclusion. Further the RFL cited reasons for Headingley's inclusion, stating that the game would be a guaranteed sell out thus increasing ticket sales in the first two games, and given that England had played at Headingley in their previous two international series the ground felt like a home stadium to most of the players. The RFL were also keen to reward Leeds Rhinos for the increase in commercial revenue generated for the RFL by their recent stadium redevelopment.

== Ticketing ==
The Rugby Football League gave a two day priority window for anyone who had bought tickets to an England game with in the previous ten years as a way of rewarding loyal supporters. A two-week presale then followed for people who had registered interest in purchasing tickets before remaining tickets were put on general sale. 30,000 people had signed up for the presale in the first 24 hours, this had risen to 50,000 by the start of presale.

Tickets were priced between £30 and £60 depending on category, with an additional £80 category at Wembley.

60,000 were bought within the first 24 hours of presale. All seated tickets for Headingley, in addition to South and East stand terraces, had sold out in less than 80 minutes, leaving only the western standing terrace tickets available. All category one seats at Everton had also sold out within the first day. By day two of presale, Headingley had sold out completely with over 75,000 tickets sold in total. Everton sold out within hours of general sale, with an estimated fewer than 1,500 tickets available after presale. In May, Rugby League Commercial revealed tickets for Wembley had surpassed 30,000, with the 40,000 mark being reach in September. Addition tickets were released for the Bramley-Moore Dock Stadium following Everton successfully passing the test events required for a new stadium and a final capacity being made official for the stadium. These tickets went to supporters on a waiting list who missed out on tickets during the original sale. Total ticket sales were at 110,000 at this point. Wembley ticket sales reached the 50,000 mark in the week before the match.

== Squads ==
Squads for the Ashes were announced on the Mondays following the 2025 NRL Grand Final and the 2025 Super League Grand Final – 6 and 13 October respectfully.

In September, England's Victor Radley ruled himself out from selection. This came after his club Sydney Roosters imposed a 10 game domestic ban after police allegations of supplying drugs. Radley had not been charged at the time.

On the week prior to Australia's squad announcement, fullback and former captain James Tedesco announced he would not participate due to the tournament conflicting with his brother's wedding.

Three months ahead of the tour Australia appointed Kevin Walters as head coach after his predecessor Mal Meninga departed to become head coach of Perth Bears. On the day of the squad announcement, Hull Kingston Rovers head coach Willie Peters was announced as Walter's assistant.

=== Australia ===
Australia's squad was announced on 6 October. Isaah Yeo of Penrith Panthers was named captain by new coach, Kevin Walters. The squad of 24 includes seven uncapped players.

Josh Addo-Carr and Bradman Best were later added to replace Xavier Coates and Zac Lomax who withdrew due to injury.

Player	Club
Josh Addo-Carr	(Australia) Parramatta Eels
Bradman Best*	(Australia) Newcastle Knights
Blayke Brailey*	(Australia) Cronulla-Sutherland Sharks
Patrick Carrigan	(Australia) Brisbane Broncos
Nathan Cleary	(Australia) Penrith Panthers
Lindsay Collins	(Australia) Sydney Roosters
Reuben Cotter	(Australia) North Queensland Cowboys
Angus Crichton	(Australia) Sydney Roosters
Tom Dearden	(Australia) North Queensland Cowboys
Dylan Edwards	(Australia) Penrith Panthers
Tino Fa'asuamaleaui	(Australia) Gold Coast Titans
Harry Grant (vc)	(Australia) Melbourne Storm
Keaon Koloamatangi*	(Australia) South Sydney Rabbitohs
Mitchell Moses	(Australia) Parramatta Eels
Cameron Munster	(Australia) Melbourne Storm
Mark Nawaqanitawase*	(Australia) Sydney Roosters
Jacob Preston*	(Australia) Canterbury-Bankstown Bulldogs
Gehamat Shibasaki*	(Australia) Brisbane Broncos
Lindsay Smith	(Australia) Penrith Panthers
Kotoni Staggs	(Australia) Brisbane Broncos
Ethan Strange*	(Australia) Canberra Raiders
Reece Walsh*	(Australia) Brisbane Broncos
Isaah Yeo (c)	(Australia) Penrith Panthers
Hudson Young	(Australia) Canberra Raiders

* = Previously uncapped

=== England ===
The England squad was announced on 13 October.

Player	Club
John Bateman	(Australia) North Queensland Cowboys
Alexander Brimson*	(Australia) Gold Coast Titans
Joe Burgess	(England) Hull KR
Daryl Clark	(England) St Helens
Herbie Farnworth	(Australia) Dolphins
Ethan Havard	(England) Wigan Warriors
Morgan Knowles	(England) St Helens
Matty Lees	(England) St Helens
Mikey Lewis	(England) Hull KR
Jez Litten	(England) Hull KR
Mike McMeeken	(England) Wakefield Trinity
Harry Newman	(England) Leeds Rhinos
Mikolaj Oledzki	(England) Leeds Rhinos
Tom Johnstone	(England) Wakefield Trinity
Kai Pearce-Paul	(Australia) Newcastle Knights
Harry Smith	(England) Wigan Warriors
Morgan Smithies	(Australia) Canberra Raiders
Owen Trout*	(England) Leigh Leopards
Alex Walmsley	(England) St Helens
Jake Wardle	(England) Wigan Warriors
Kallum Watkins	(England) Leeds Rhinos
Jack Welsby	(England) St Helens
George Williams (c)	(England) Warrington Wolves
Dom Young	(Australia) Newcastle Knights

* = Previously uncapped

== Pre-tour ==
A number of players in the Australia squad were also selected for the Prime Minister's XIII game against their PNG counterpart in Port Moresby. Australia's PM's XIII won the game 28–10.

== Tour matches ==
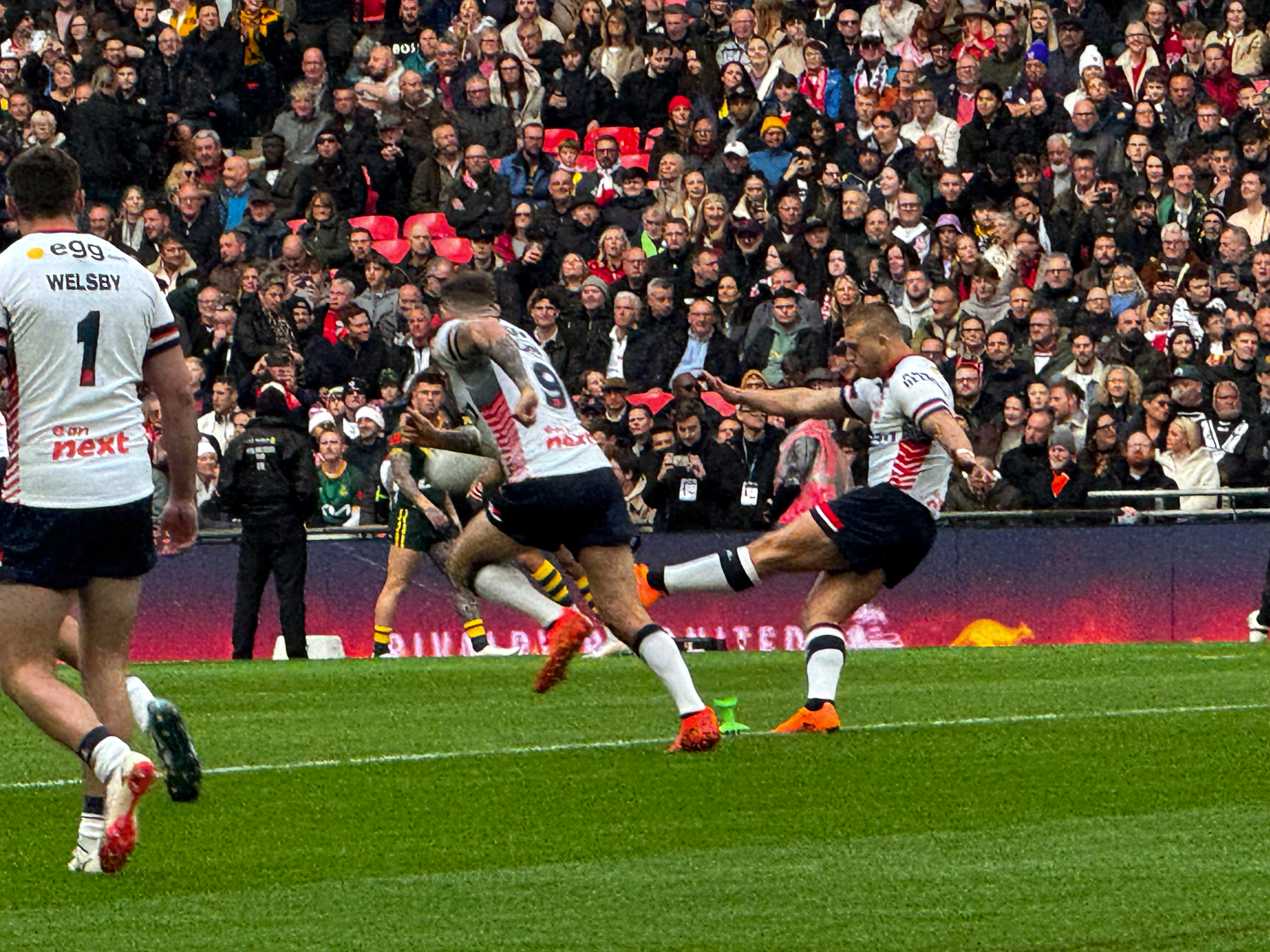
Mikey Lewis kicking off for England at the first test at Wembley Stadium

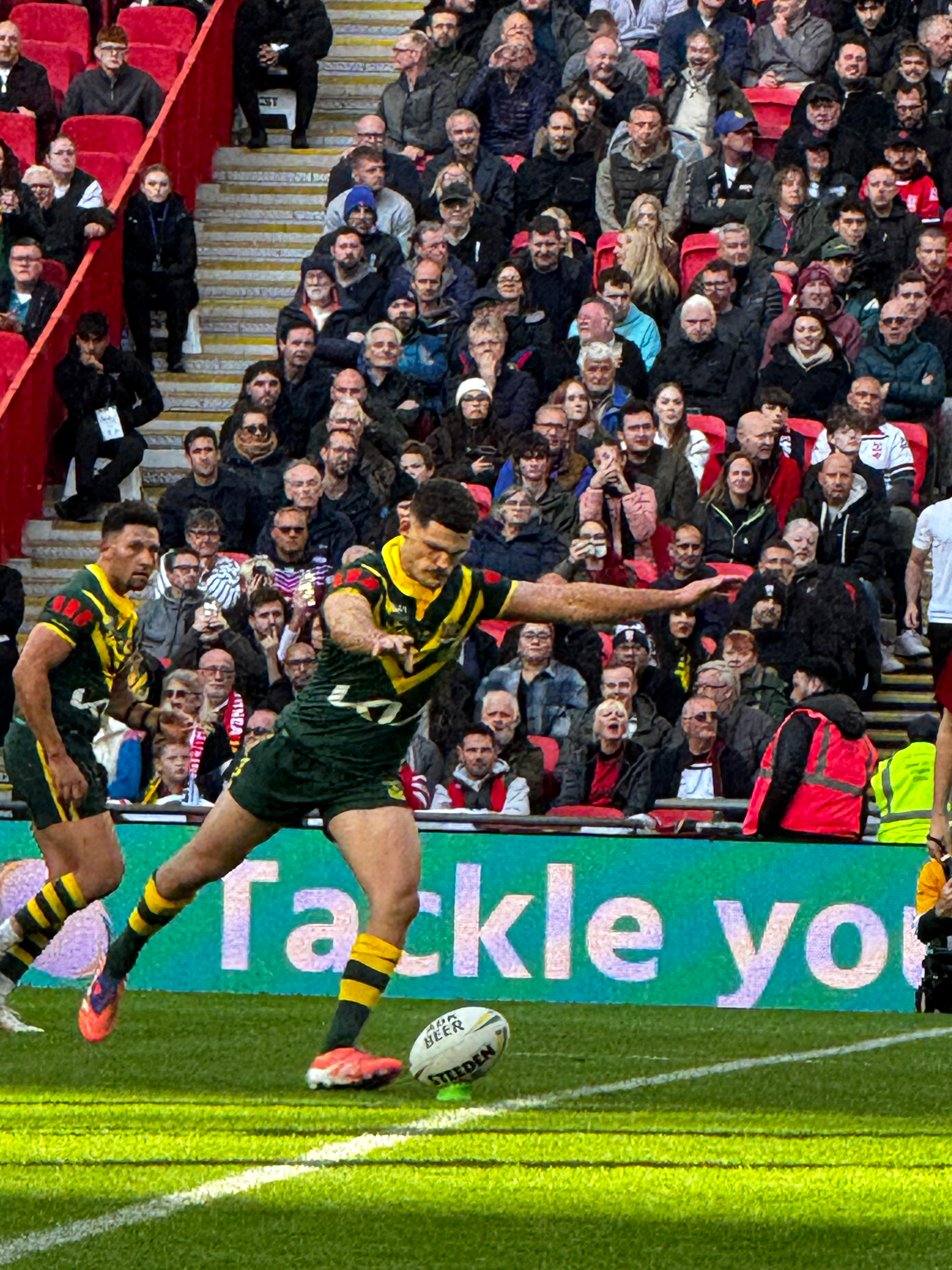
Nathan Cleary of Australia kicking off for the second half

In March 2025, France head coach Laurent Frayssinous revealed in an interview with L'Indépendant that the three fixtures against England had been scheduled for 25 October, 1 November, and 8 November, and that then Australia head coach Mal Meninga had requested a warm up game against France – a request endorsed by the French Rugby League Federation. This game however was vetoed by Australia's Rugby League Players Association and was replaced with two joint training sessions between the French and Australian national teams in London. Fixtures against England were confirmed on 26 March.

Australia arrived in the UK on 15 October and were based at St Marys University in Twickenham ahead of the Wembley test.

Ahead of each fixture, God Save the King was performed by English mezzo-soprano Laura Wright, and Advance Australia Fair was performed by Australian-French mezzo-soprano Rebecca Hart. DJ Tony Perry also performed pre-match entertainment at each test.

=== Officiating ===
Both governing bodies, the RFL and ARLC, appointed a referee from their respective panel of officials. Liam Moore was the RFL's choice and refereed the first test, whereas Grant Atkins was the choice of the ARLC and took charge of the second test. Both referees were assessed on pre-agreed criteria with the best performing official being given the job for the third test. Atkins was appointed as match official for the third and final test.

The two governing bodies also agreed that golden point overtime would only be used in the third match if needed to decide the series and that the first two games could end as draws.

=== First test ===
25 October 2025
14:30 BST (UTC+01:00)

England	6–26	Australia
Tries: 1 Clark 76'; Goals: 1 Lewis 77' (1/1)	1st: 0–8; 2nd: 6–18; Report	Tries: 4 Walsh 22', 72'; Crichton 45', 65'; Goals: 5 Cleary 23', pen 40', 47', 66', 73' (5/5)

Wembley Stadium, London
Attendance: 60,812
Referee: Liam Moore (England)
Video referee: Jack Smith (England)
Touch judges: Mark Craven (England) and Richard Thompson (England)
Player of the Match: Reece Walsh (Australia)

Team details
England		Position	Australia
Name	Number	Position	Number	Name
Jack Welsby	1	FB	1	Reece Walsh
Dominic Young	2	WG	2	Mark Nawaqanitawase
Herbie Farnworth	3	CE	3	Kotoni Staggs
Jake Wardle	4	CE	4	Gehamat Shibasaki
Tom Johnstone	5	WG	5	Josh Addo-Carr
George Williams (c)	6	SO/FE	6	Cameron Munster
Mikey Lewis	7	SH/HB	7	Nathan Cleary
Ethan Havard	8	PR	8	Patrick Carrigan
Daryl Clark	9	HK	9	Harry Grant (vc)
Matty Lees	10	PF	10	Tino Fa'asuamaleaui
John Bateman	11	SR	11	Angus Crichton
Kai Pearce-Paul	12	SR	12	Hudson Young
Morgan Knowles	13	LF/LK	13	Isaah Yeo (c)
Jez Litten	14	IN	14	Tom Dearden
Alex Walmsley	15	IN	15	Lindsay Collins
Owen Trout	16	IN	16	Reuben Cotter
Mike McMeeken	17	IN	17	Keaon Koloamatangi
AJ Brimson (not used)	18	RES	18	Bradman Best (not used)
Shaun Wane		Coach		Kevin Walters
NRL.com

The first test saw a closely contested first half with England responding well following Reece Walsh's opening try. However, Australia's superior quality, evident in the first half, played out in the second; the Kangaroos dominated the game scoring three unanswered tries with a second half brace from Angus Crichton in addition to Walsh getting a second. A late England resurgence in the final five minutes saw a consolation try for the hosts scored by Daryl Clark. Australia captain, Isaah Yeo, failed a head injury assessment early in the first half and was ruled out for the second test. The attendance of 60,812 set the record for the highest attended Ashes game held in the UK. Despite this, the match drew criticism for its "flat" atmosphere, particularly attributed to England's performance, but also with Wembley being far outside England's traditional rugby league territory and the stadium being only two thirds full.

=== Second test ===
1 November 2025
14:30 GMT (UTC±00:00)

England	4–14	Australia
Goals: 2 Smith pen 9', pen 40' (2/2); Sin bin: Young (yellow card) 2' to 12'	1st: 4–4; 2nd: 0–10; Report	Tries: 2 Munster 49'; Young 53'; Goals: 3 Cleary pen 3', pen 25', 54' (3/4); Sin bin: Fa'asuamaleaui (yellow card) 2' to 12'; Walsh (yellow card) 66' to 76'

Hill Dickinson Stadium, Liverpool
Attendance: 52,106
Referee: Grant Atkins (Australia)
Video referee: Jack Smith (England)
Player of the Match: Cameron Munster (Australia)

Team details
England		Position	Australia
Name	Number	Position	Number	Name
AJ Brimson	1	FB	1	Reece Walsh
Dominic Young	2	WG	2	Mark Nawaqanitawase
Herbie Farnworth	3	CE	3	Kotoni Staggs
Jake Wardle	4	CE	4	Gehamat Shibasaki
Tom Johnstone	5	WG	5	Josh Addo-Carr
George Williams (c)	6	SO/FE	6	Cameron Munster
Harry Smith	7	SH/HB	7	Nathan Cleary
Mike McMeeken	8	PR	8	Lindsay Collins
Jez Litten	9	HK	9	Harry Grant (c)
Matty Lees	10	PF	10	Tino Fa'asuamaleaui
Kai Pearce-Paul	11	SR	11	Angus Crichton
Kallum Watkins	12	SR	12	Hudson Young
Morgan Knowles	13	LF/LK	13	Patrick Carrigan
Mikey Lewis	14	IN	14	Tom Dearden
Alex Walmsley	15	IN	15	Lindsay Smith
Morgan Smithies	16	IN	16	Reuben Cotter
Mikolaj Oledzki	17	IN	17	Keaon Koloamatangi
Owen Trout (not used)	18	RES	18	Bradman Best (not used)
Shaun Wane		Coach		Kevin Walters
NRL.com

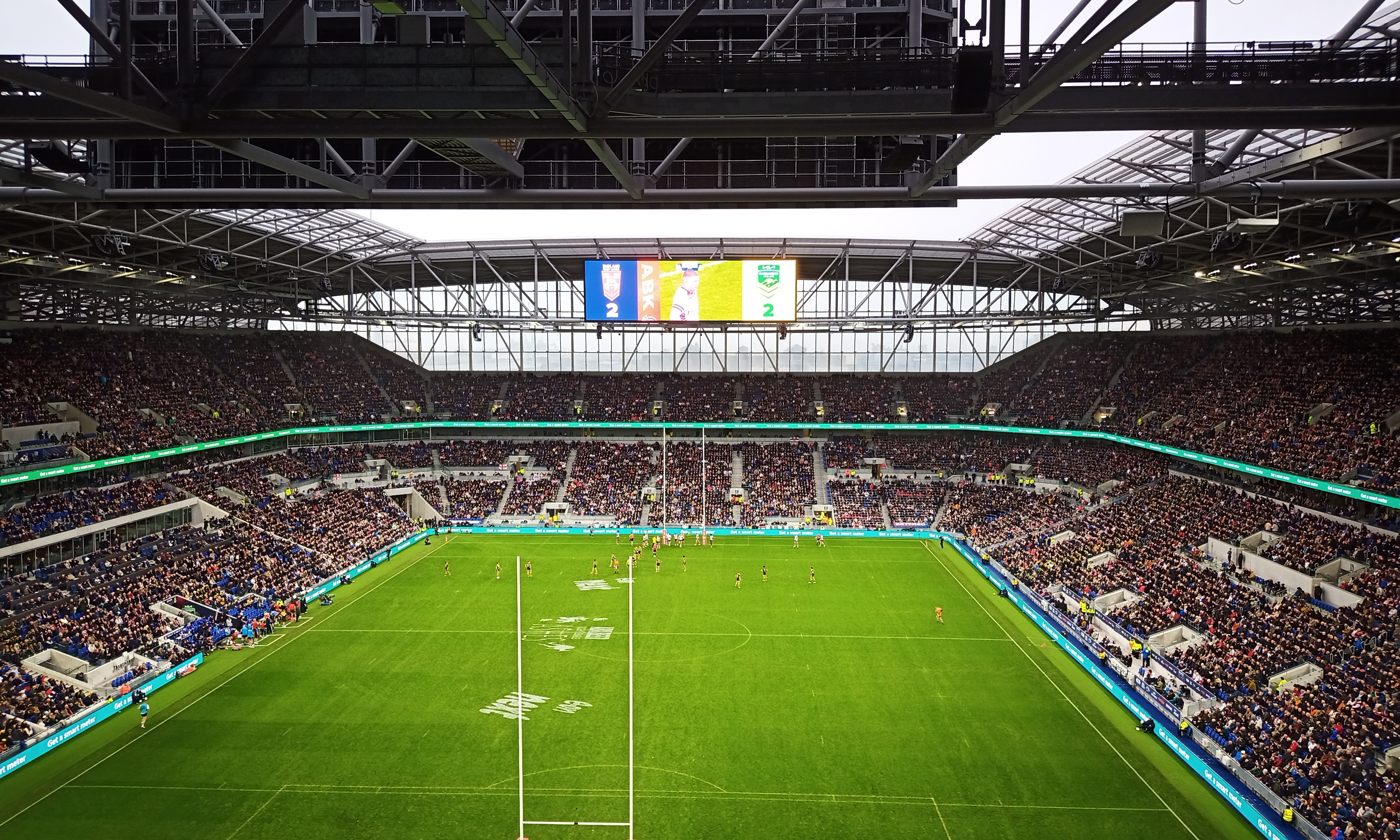
The Hill Dickinson Stadium during the second test

The second test saw an improved first half performance from England, however they were unable to take advantage, despite going over the try line twice only for both to be denied by the video referee. A tryless first half saw two penalties apiece converted by Harry Smith and Nathan Cleary respectively after ill discipline from both sides. The second half, as in the first test, saw Australia take control of the game with two tries in four minutes early in the half, by Cameron Munster and Hudson Young. England could not capitalise on Reece Walsh's sin bin, resulting in Australia winning the game and the Ashes with a final score of 14–4.

=== Third test ===
8 November 2025
14:30 GMT (UTC±00:00)

England	8–30	Australia
Tries: 1 Williams 33'; Goals: 2 Smith 34', pen 40' (2/2)	1st: 8–12; 2nd: 0–18; Report	Tries: 5 Addo-Carr 5'; Young 26'; Grant 62'; Walsh 68', 78'; Goals: 5 Cleary 7', 27', 63', 69', 79' (5/5)

Headingley Rugby Stadium, Leeds
Attendance: 19,500
Referee: Grant Atkins (Australia)
Video referee: Tom Grant (England)
Player of the Match: Harry Grant (Australia)

Team details
England		Position	Australia
Name	Number	Position	Number	Name
AJ Brimson	1	FB	1	Reece Walsh
Joe Burgess	2	WG	2	Mark Nawaqanitawase
Harry Newman	3	CE	3	Kotoni Staggs
Herbie Farnworth	4	CE	4	Gehamat Shibasaki
Tom Johnstone	5	WG	5	Josh Addo-Carr
George Williams (c)	6	SO/FE	6	Cameron Munster
Harry Smith	7	SH/HB	7	Nathan Cleary
Mike McMeeken	8	PR	8	Patrick Carrigan
Jez Litten	9	HK	9	Harry Grant
Matty Lees	10	PF	10	Tino Fa'asuamaleaui
Kai Pearce-Paul	11	SR	11	Angus Crichton
Kallum Watkins	12	SR	12	Hudson Young
Morgan Knowles	13	LF/LK	13	Isaah Yeo (c)
Mikey Lewis	14	IN	14	Tom Dearden
Alex Walmsley	15	IN	15	Lindsay Collins
Morgan Smithies	16	IN	16	Reuben Cotter
Mikolaj Oledzki	17	IN	17	Keaon Koloamatangi
Owen Trout (not used)	18	RES	18	Bradman Best (not used)
Shaun Wane		Coach		Kevin Walters
NRL.com

The third and final test saw a far more even game in terms of quality across the 80 minutes. However England errors led to three of Australia's five tries, most of these tries coming in the final quarter of the game. This all resulted in a 30–8 victory for Australia and a 3–0 Ashes series whitewash.

== Broadcasting ==
Region	Network
United Kingdom	BBC One
Australia	Fox League; Nine Network
New Zealand	Sky Sport
Pacific Islands	Digicel
United States	Fox Sports 1
Estonia; Latvia; Lithuania; Moldova; Ukraine	Sport Media; Group – Channel 1
Rest of World	SuperLeague+

The first test had an average television audience of 818,000 the UK, accounting for 14.2% of viewership.

The second test had an average television audience of 837,000 the UK, accounting for 13.8% of viewership.

The third and final test had an average television audience of 627,000 the UK, accounting for 9.3% of viewership.

== Aftermath ==
Following England's Ashes defeat at the conclusion of the second test, England head coach Shaun Wane stated that England will continue to struggle to beat Australia until the intensity of Super League improves, further stating NRL players experience "test level match" on an almost weekly basis. This point was also echoed by The Guardian and British rugby league website LoveRugbyLeague, with both stating Super League's expansion to 14 teams will not help improve intensity. The Guardian's Gavin Willacy went further on this suggesting that Bradford Bulls, Castleford Tigers, Huddersfield Giants, Toulouse Olympique, and York Knights aren't fit for Super League as they only provide "limited challenges" to top players. Further criticism came as a result of Super League not allowing the national side any on field training sessions during the 2025 season, a point contested by Wane before the tour. The Guardian again, called out the "embarrassing" hypocrisy of the RFL by billing the series as the most important series in year while also denying any training sessions in its build up.

Sky Sports pundit and former international Brian Carney described England's performance as a "disaster" and called England a team "paralysed by fear". He further criticised multiples of Shaun Wane's decisions and how many of them didn't pan out.

Similar media analysis was also widely made in Australia, however Australia head coach Kevin Walters rubbished Australia's media coverage who frequently described the series as "a walk in the park", going as far as to say these journalists and pundits should "come over and walk with them".

BBC Sport describe the revived Ashes as a series Australia want but England need.

The 2025 Ashes was spectated by 132,418 proving to be one of the most popular international rugby league events in recent times in the United Kingdom. The series also ranked third in the most spectated Ashes series held in the UK after 1990 and 1994. The next Ashes series is scheduled for 2028.

Despite the whitewash, NRL Senior Reporter Brad Walter listed England as one of five nations (along with Australia) who were capable of winning the 2026 World Cup, however caveated this by putting Australia and New Zealand as favourites.

Australia's Cameron Munster won the Fulton–Reilly Award as player of the series, gaining the votes of seven of the 11-member voting panel. Also receiving votes were Harry Grant with two, while Angus Crichton and Reece Walsh received one vote each.

Shaun Wane stepped down as England head coach in the January following the series.

== Incidents ==
Ahead of the second test, UK serial prankster Daniel Jarvis gained access to the pitch and lined up with the Australia team before kickoff during the national anthems. He was subsequently detained by Merseyside Police at 2:30pm initially on suspension of "fraud by false representation". The following day he was charged with "disrupting a person engaged in a lawful activity", to which he pleaded not guilty on 3 November with a trial date set for April 2026.

On 21 April 2026, Jarvis pleaded guilty to trespassing and was given a 10-week suspended sentence, and a community order including a rehabilitation activity requirement and 150 hours of unpaid work, in addition to being order to pay £500 in damages and a victim surcharge.

== See also ==
- 2025 England wheelchair rugby league tour of Australia
