= Semi Valemei =

Fiji international rugby league footballer

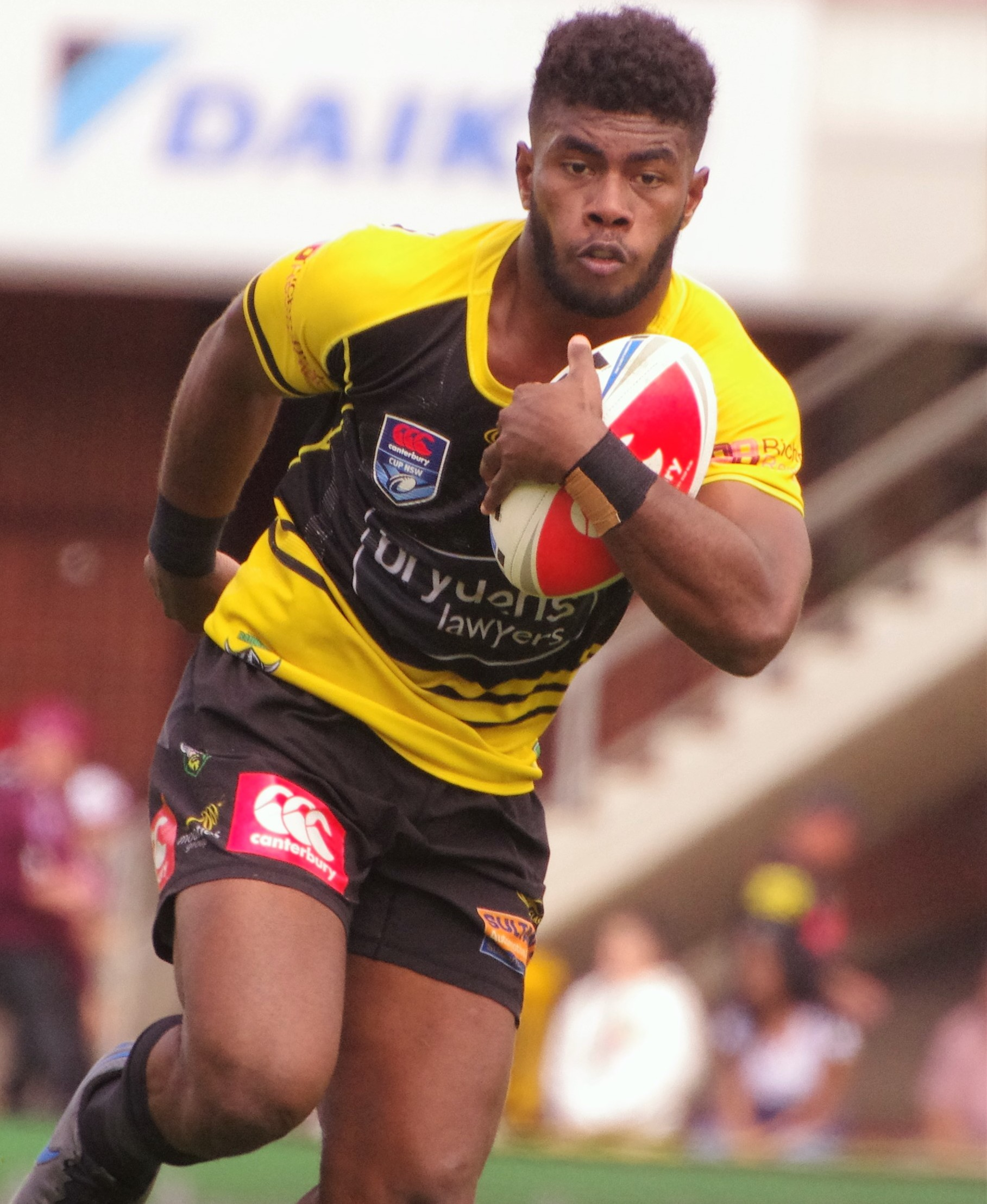

Personal information
- Born: 20 January 1999 (age 27) Labasa, Fiji
- Height: 6 ft 1 in (1.86 m)
- Weight: 16 st 3 lb (103 kg)

Playing information
- Position: Wing, Centre
Club
Years	Team	Pld	T	G	FG	P
2020–22	Canberra Raiders	29	9	0	0	36
2023–25	North Qld Cowboys	17	14	0	0	56
2026–	Castleford Tigers	7	3	0	0	12
	Total	53	26	0	0	104
Representative
Years	Team	Pld	T	G	FG	P
2019	Fiji 9s	2	0	0	0	0
2022–	Fiji	12	8	0	0	32
- Source: As of 6 November 2026

Semi Valemei (born 20 January 1999) is a Fijian professional rugby league footballer who plays as a winger and centre for the Castleford Tigers in the Super League and Fiji at international level.

He has previously played for the Canberra Raiders and North Queensland Cowboys in the National Rugby League.

== Background ==
Born in Labasa, Fiji, Valemei attended Seaqaqa Central College and Natabua High School, where he played rugby union.

In 2017, he was scouted by former NRL player Wise Kativerata and moved to Australia to play rugby league. He moved to the Sunshine Coast, Queensland, playing for the Caloundra Sharks before being signed by the Canberra Raiders.

== Playing career ==
In 2018, Valemei played for the Raiders' Jersey Flegg Cup feeder side, Mounties.

In 2019, he played for Mounties in the New South Wales Cup and for the Raiders in the Jersey Flegg Cup, scoring a hat-trick in their Grand Final loss to the South Sydney Rabbitohs. In October 2019, he represented Fiji at the 2019 Rugby League World Cup 9s.

=== 2020 ===
In round 10 of the 2020 NRL season, Valemei was named to make his NRL debut against the Sydney Roosters.

He played in all three of Canberra's finals matches including the preliminary final defeat to Melbourne Storm. He played a total of ten games in his debut season.

=== 2021 ===
Valemei made eleven appearances for Canberra in the 2021 NRL season which saw the club finish 10th on the table and miss out on the finals.

=== 2023 ===
On 12 May, Valemei was granted a release from his Raiders contract and joined the North Queensland Cowboys on a one-and-a-half-year contract. Valemei scored a hat-trick on his club debut for the Cowboys in their 45–20 win over Melbourne during round 14 at North Queensland Stadium. He played nine matches for North Queensland in the 2023 NRL season and scored nine tries as the club finished 11th on the table.

=== 2024 ===
He played eighteen games for North Queensland in the 2024 NRL season as they finished 5th on the table. He played in both finals games for North Queensland as they were eliminated in the second week by Cronulla. On 21 August, Valemei re-signed with the Cowboys until the end of 2025.

=== 2025 ===
Valemei played just four NRL games in an injury-interrupted 2025 season. He scored four tries, which included a double against the Brisbane Broncos in his final game for North Queensland.

On 3 September, he signed for the Castleford Tigers in the Super League on a two-year contract.

=== 2026 ===
Valemei was assigned Castleford's number 2 shirt for the 2026 season. In January, he suffered a hamstring strain during pre-season training, ruling him out of the opening rounds. He was first included in Castleford's 21-man squad in March. Valemei made his debut in round 5, scoring a try in a heavy defeat against Warrington Wolves. The following week, he suffered a concussion in Castleford's victory against Bradford Bulls, and missed further games in April with a knee issue.

== Statistics ==
Appearances and points in all competitions by year
Club	Season	Tier	App	T	G	DG	Pts
Canberra Raiders	2020	NRL	10	4	0	0	16
Canberra Raiders	2021	NRL	11	2	0	0	8
Canberra Raiders	2022	NRL	8	3	0	0	12
Canberra Raiders	Total		29	9	0	0	36
North Queensland Cowboys	2023	NRL	9	9	0	0	36
North Queensland Cowboys	2024	NRL	4	1	0	0	4
North Queensland Cowboys	2025	NRL	4	4	0	0	16
North Queensland Cowboys	Total		17	14	0	0	56
Castleford Tigers	2026	Super League	7	3	0	0	12
Castleford Tigers	2027	Super League	0	0	0	0	0
Castleford Tigers	Total		7	3	0	0	12
Career total			53	26	0	0	104

As of match played 26 June 2026
