= Gehamat Shibasaki =

Australian rugby league footballer (born 1998)

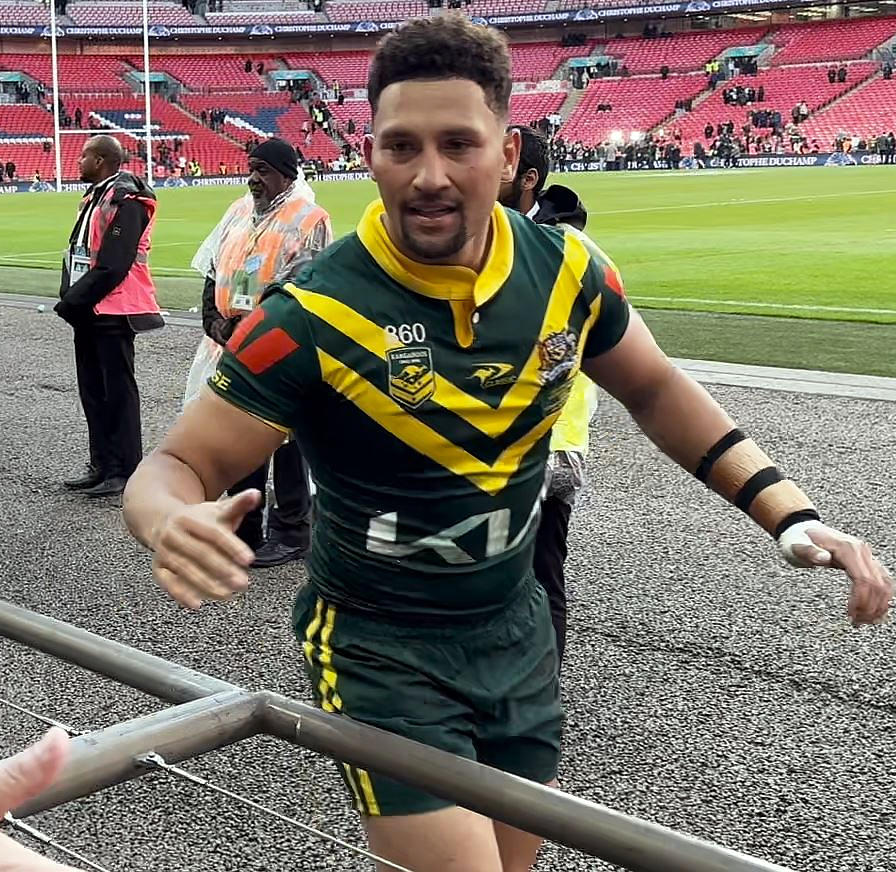

Personal information
- Full name: Gehamat Shibasaki
- Born: 18 February 1998 (age 28) Townsville, Queensland, Australia
- Height: 187 cm (6 ft 2 in)
- Weight: 96 kg (15 st 2 lb)

Playing information

Rugby league
- Position: Centre, Wing
Club
| Years | Team | Pld | T | G | FG | P |
|---|---|---|---|---|---|---|
| 2018–19 | Brisbane Broncos | 13 | 0 | 0 | 0 | 0 |
| 2020–21 | Newcastle Knights | 14 | 6 | 0 | 0 | 24 |
| 2023 | North Qld Cowboys | 2 | 0 | 0 | 0 | 0 |
| 2024 | South Sydney | 1 | 0 | 0 | 0 | 0 |
| 2025–26 | Brisbane Broncos | 41 | 21 | 0 | 0 | 84 |
| 2027– | Perth Bears | 0 | 0 | 0 | 0 | 0 |
| | Total | 71 | 27 | 0 | 0 | 108 |
Representative
| Years | Team | Pld | T | G | FG | P |
| 2018 | Prime Minister's XIII | 1 | 0 | 0 | 0 | 0 |
| 2018 | Queensland Residents | 1 | 0 | 0 | 0 | 0 |
| 2025 | Queensland | 1 | 0 | 0 | 0 | 0 |
| 2025 | Australia | 3 | 0 | 0 | 0 | 0 |

Rugby union
Club
| Years | Team | Pld | T | G | FG | P |
|---|---|---|---|---|---|---|
| 2022 | Green Rockets Tokatsu | 8 | 1 | 0 | 0 | 5 |
- Source: As of 16 November 2026
- Relatives: Enemarki Shibasaki (brother); Jamal Shibasaki (brother)

Gehamat Shibasaki (born 18 February 1998) is an Australian professional rugby league footballer who plays as a centre for the Perth Bears in the National Rugby League.

He previously played for the South Sydney Rabbitohs, North Queensland Cowboys, Newcastle Knights and Brisbane Broncos with whom he won the 2025 NRL Grand Final in the NRL and rugby union for Green Rockets Tokatsu in the Japan Rugby League One rugby union competition.

Shibasaki has also played for Queensland in the State of Origin series, and has represented Australia in the 2025 Kangaroo tour of England.

== Background ==
Shibasaki was born in Townsville, Queensland, Australia, and is of Torres Strait Islander, Japanese and Malay descent. His younger brother Jamal also plays in the NRL for North Queensland Cowboys.

He played his junior rugby league for Townsville Brothers before being signed by the Brisbane Broncos.

== Playing career ==
=== Early career ===
Shibasaki played for the Brisbane Broncos NYC team in 2016–2017.

On 13 July 2016, Shibasaki played for the Queensland under 20's team against New South Wales, playing at centre in the 36–22 loss at ANZ Stadium.

In February 2017, Shibasaki was selected in Brisbane's 2017 NRL Auckland Nines squad.

On 31 May 2017, Shibasaki was selected to play at centre again for Queensland in the Under 20's State of Origin clash in the 30–16 loss at Suncorp Stadium.

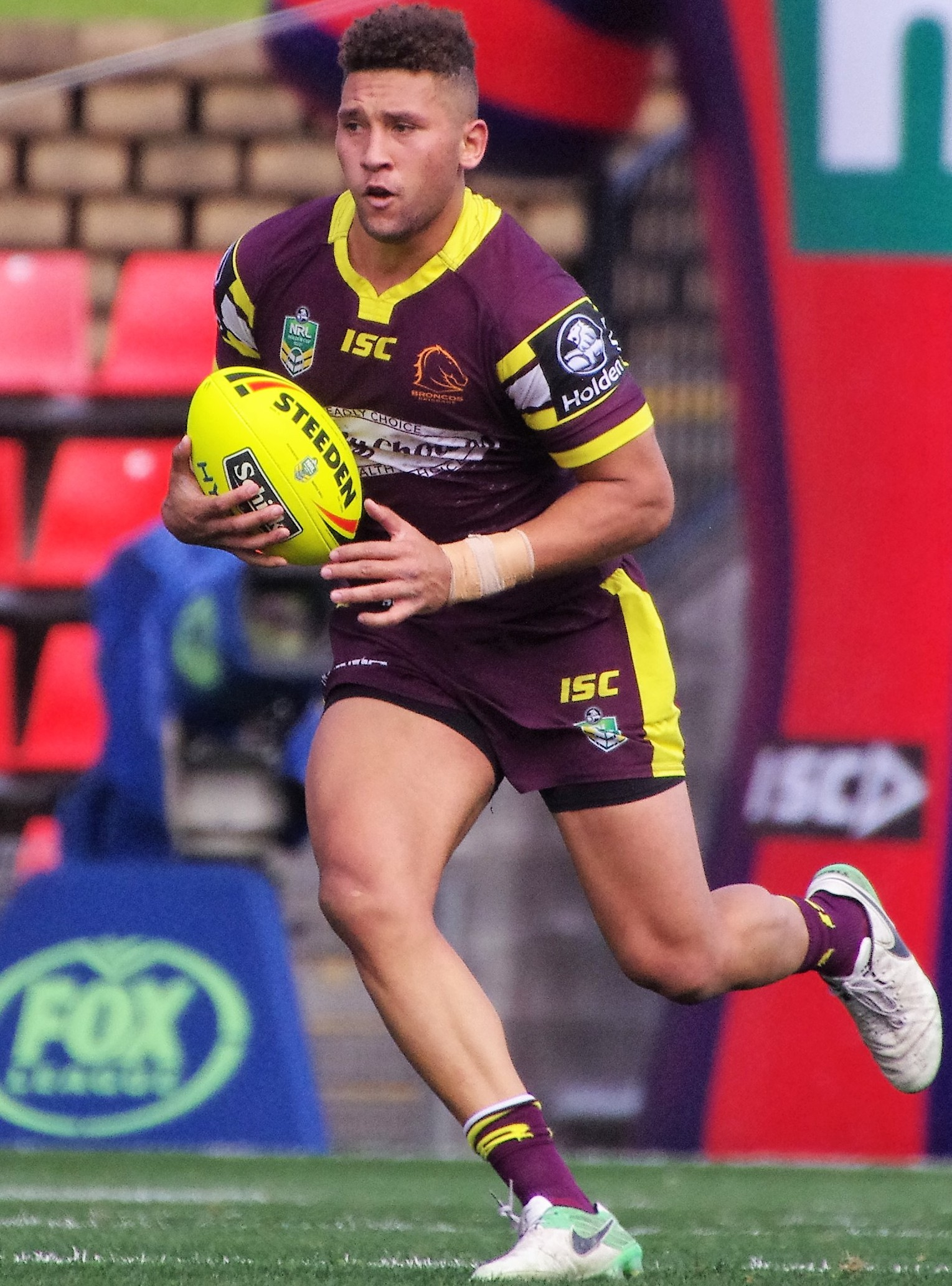
Shibasaki playing for Brisbane in 2017

=== 2018 ===
In 2018, Shibasaki moved from the Under 20s team to the Queensland Cup, playing for the Norths Devils. In round 11 against the Sydney Roosters, Shibasaki was named to make his NRL debut but was only to be replaced later in the week by Kotoni Staggs. On 11 July 2018, Shibasaki was selected for the third year in a row for Queensland Under 20's at centre as they won their first title in a 30–12 victory at Suncorp Stadium. In round 22 of the 2018 NRL season, Shibasaki made his NRL debut for the Brisbane side against the North Queensland Cowboys in his home town in Townsville, playing at centre for the demoted Jordan Kahu in Brisbane's heartbreaking 34–30 loss at 1300SMILES Stadium. A day after making his debut, Shibasaki was rewarded with a contract extension with the Brisbane Broncos to the end of the 2020 NRL season.

=== 2019 ===
Shibasaki made 12 appearances for Brisbane in the 2019 NRL season as the club finished 8th on the table and qualified for the finals. Shibasaki played in the club's elimination final against Parramatta which Brisbane lost 58–0 at the new Western Sydney Stadium. The defeat was the worst in Brisbane's history and also the biggest finals defeat in history. In December, he gained a release from Brisbane to join the Newcastle Knights effective immediately on a three-year contract.

=== 2020 ===
Shibasaki played 11 games for Newcastle in the 2020 NRL season. Shibasaki did not play in Newcastle's finals campaign where they were eliminated in the opening week against South Sydney.

=== 2021 ===
Shibasaki played three games for the Newcastle side in 2021 before being released at the end of the season.

=== 2022 ===
On 17 July, Shibasaki signed with the North Queensland Cowboys on a train and trial contract for the remainder of the 2022 NRL season. On 15 November, he signed a one-year contract with the club for 2023.

=== 2023 ===
In round 3 of the 2023 NRL season, Shibasaki made his club debut for North Queensland in their 26–12 loss against the New Zealand Warriors. On 20 September, it was announced that Shibasaki would be leaving North Queensland after not being offered a new contract. Shibasaki was one of nine players who were released.

=== 2024 ===
In round 10 of the 2024 NRL season, Shibasaki joined the South Sydney Rabbitohs on a week by week playing contract. This was to help fill spots from other players being injured. Shibasaki had been playing for the Townsville Blackhawks in the Queensland Cup which was an affiliated team with South Sydney.

=== 2025 ===
In early 2025, Shibasaki signed a train and trial deal with Brisbane. Shibasaki started at centre in week 2 of the 2025 pre season challenge scoring the opening try for the Brisbane Broncos against the Gold Coast Titans in a 50–16 win. Shibasaki started round 1 at centre for the Brisbane Broncos, scoring the first try his first for the club in a 50–14 win over the Sydney Roosters.

In round 4, he scored two tries for Brisbane in their 20–12 victory over the Dolphins, winning the battle medal for player of the match. In round 14, Shibasaki scored two tries in Brisbane's 44–14 victory over strugglers the Gold Coast. In round 16, Shibasaki scored two tries in Brisbane's 34–28 win over the Cronulla-Sutherland Sharks, including scoring the match winner after coming back from a 28–12 deficit with 27 minutes to go. In Round 17, Shibasaki scored his third consecutive double in a 26–12 victory of the New Zealand Warriors.

In July, Shibasaki made his State of Origin series debut in game 3 of the 2025 State of Origin series for Queensland rugby league team replacing the injured Kalyn Ponga where Queensland won 24–12 winning the 2025 State of Origin series. On 2 September, it was announced by the Brisbane club that Shibasaki had been demoted from the first team due to breaching club standards.

On 5 October, Shibasaki scored the match winning try in the 2025 NRL Grand Final for Brisbane in a 26–22 win over the Melbourne Storm.

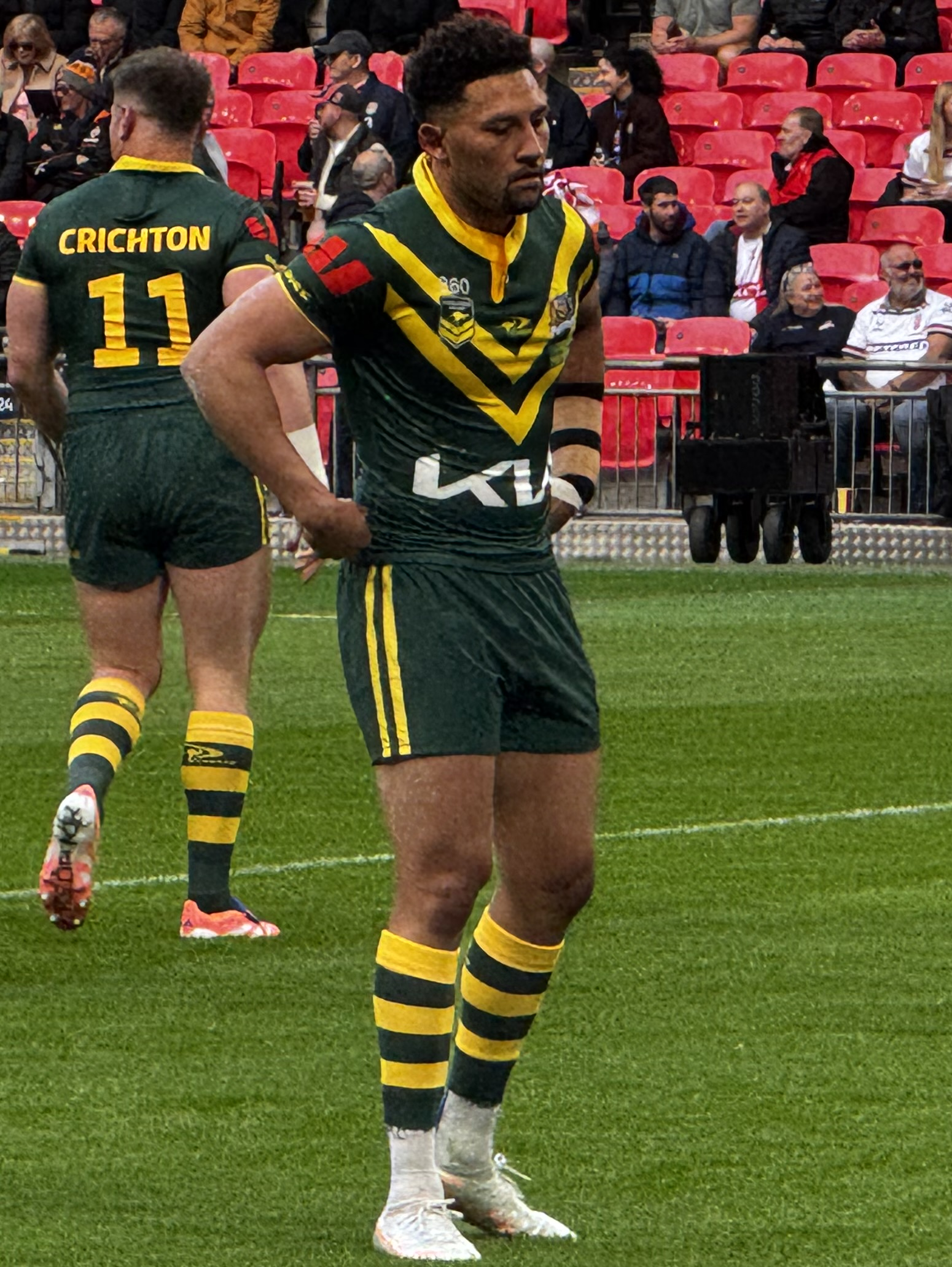
Shibasaki warming up for Australia in 2025

Shortly following the Grand Final, Shibasaki was selected for Australia in the 2025 Kangaroo tour of England.

=== 2026 ===
On 19 February, Shibasaki played in Brisbane's World Club Challenge loss against Hull Kingston Rovers.

On 23 July 2026, it was announced that Shibasaki would depart the Brisbane outfit and he had signed for the Perth Bears. He was unable to replicate his form from 2025 as he made 16 appearances scoring just three tries. Brisbane would fail to defend their premiership slumping to 14th on the table.

== Statistics ==
| Year | Team | Games | Tries | Pts |
|---|---|---|---|---|
| 2018 | Brisbane Broncos | 1 | | |
| 2019 | Brisbane Broncos | 12 | | |
| 2020 | Newcastle Knights | 11 | 5 | 20 |
| 2021 | Newcastle Knights | 3 | 1 | 4 |
| 2023 | North Queensland Cowboys | 2 | | |
| 2024 | South Sydney Rabbitohs | 1 | | |
| 2025 | Brisbane Broncos | 25 | 18 | 72 |
| 2026 | Brisbane Broncos | 16 | 3 | 12 |
| 2027 | Perth Bears | | | |
| | Totals | 71 | 27 | 108 |

== Honours ==
Individual

- Brisbane Broncos u20s Best Back: 2016
- Battle Medal: 2025

Team

- NRL Pre-Season Challenge Winner: 2025
- NRL Grand Finalist: 2025
- NRL Premiership: 2025

Representative

- PM's XIII Test Champion: 2018
- State Of Origin Series Winner: 2025
- Rugby League Ashes Winner: 2025
