= Thomas Flegler =

Australia international rugby league footballer

Tom Flegler
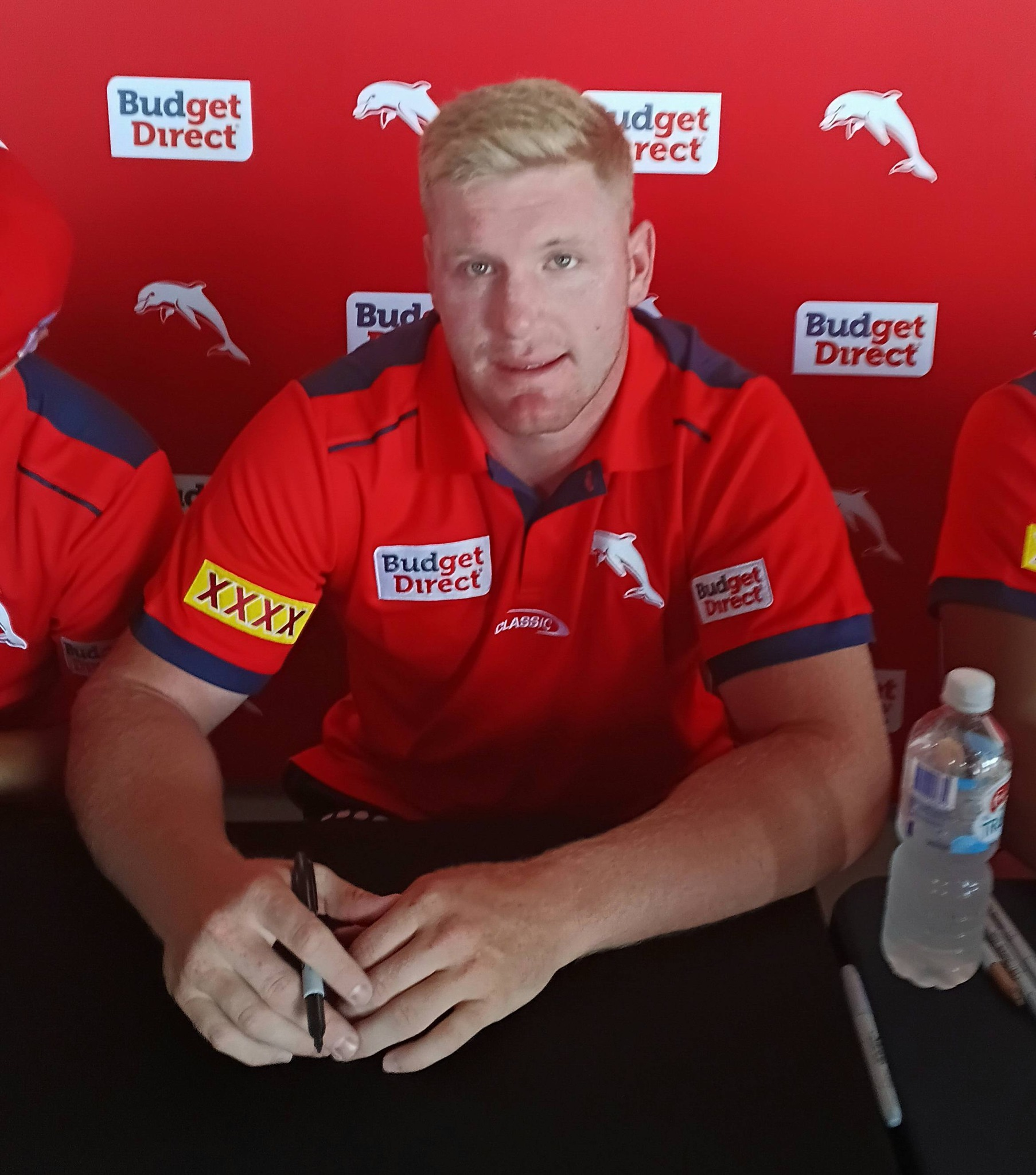

Personal information
- Full name: Thomas Flegler
- Born: 19 August 1999 (age 27) Tully, Queensland, Australia
- Height: 190 cm (6 ft 3 in)
- Weight: 110 kg (17 st 5 lb)

Playing information
- Position: Prop, Lock
Club
Years	Team	Pld	T	G	FG	P
2019–23	Brisbane Broncos	96	5	0	0	20
2024–27	Dolphins	25	3	0	0	12
2028	Nth Qld Cowboys
	Total	121	8	0	0	32
Representative
Years	Team	Pld	T	G	FG	P
2019–22	Prime Minister's XIII	2	0	0	0	0
2021–26	Queensland	6	1	0	0	4
2023	Australia	1	0	0	0	0
- Source: As of 19 November 2026

Thomas Flegler (born 19 August 1999) is an Australian professional rugby league footballer who plays as a prop and lock for the Dolphins in the National Rugby League (NRL). He also represents Australia at the international level.

Flegler previously played for the Brisbane Broncos in the NRL, the Prime Minister's XIII internationally, and Queensland in the State of Origin series.

== Background ==
Flegler was born in Innisfail, Queensland, Australia. He played his junior rugby league for the Tully Tigers, before being signed by the Brisbane Broncos.

== Career ==
In early 2018, Queensland under-20s coach, Justin Hodges drew comparisons of Flegler to former Broncos forward, Shane Webcke.

=== Brisbane Broncos (2019–2023) ===
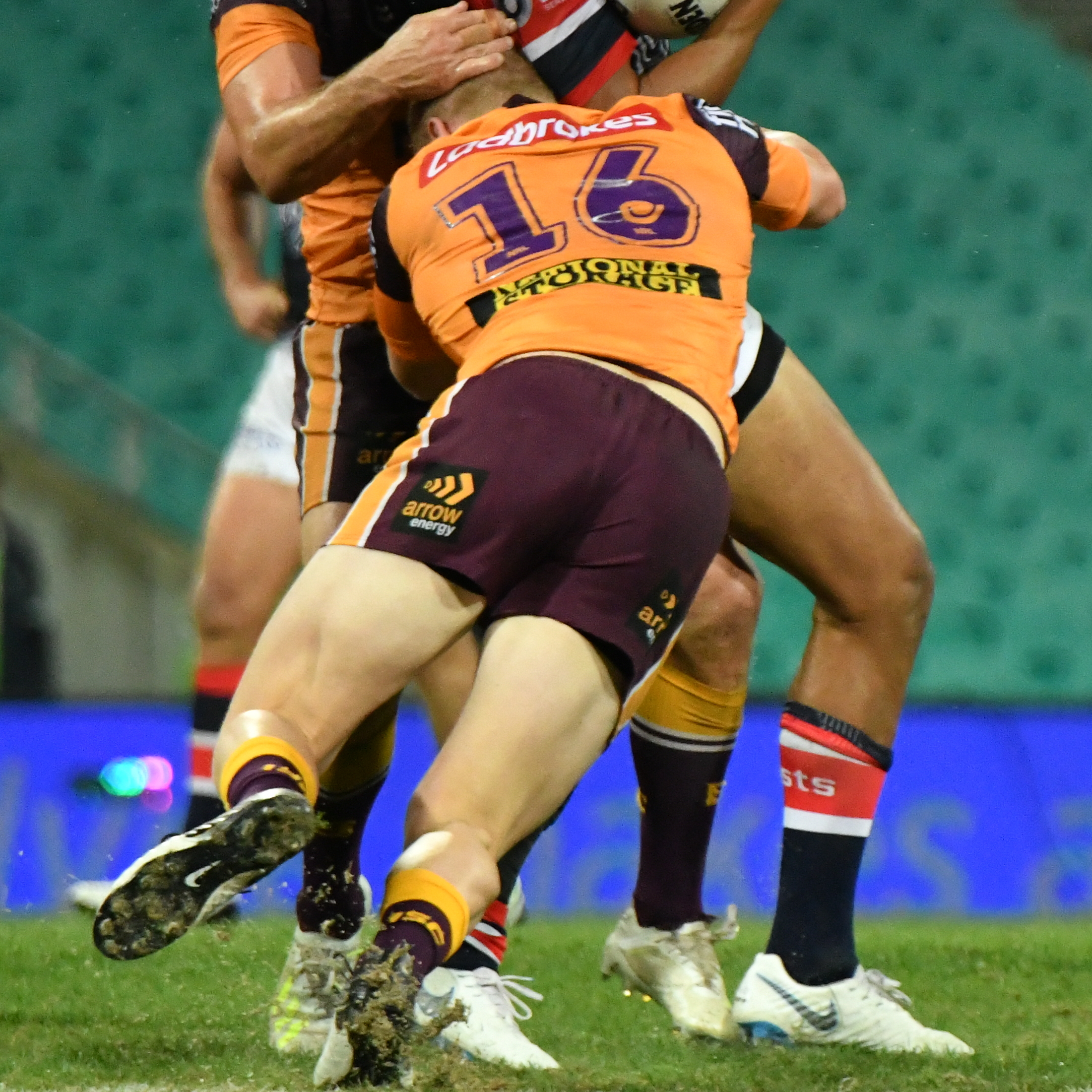
Flegler in 2019

Flegler made his NRL debut for Brisbane in round 1 of the 2019 NRL season against the Melbourne Storm. In Round 2 against the North Queensland Cowboys, he ran for the most running metres, running for 196 metres off twelve runs. On 29 June, he scored his first career try for the Broncos in a 26–12 loss to the Newcastle Knights. On 7 October 2019, Flegler was named at prop for the U23 Junior Australian side. On 21 October, Flegler won the Broncos' Rookie of the Year along with Patrick Carrigan.

Flegler played thirteen games for Brisbane in the 2020 NRL season. In 2021, he made his state of origin debut for Queensland in game 3 of the series due to the suspension of forwards David Fifita and Jai Arrow, where Queensland won 20-18.

In round 19 of the 2021 NRL season, Flegler was sent to the sin bin for a dangerous high tackle on Penrith's Isaah Yeo in Brisbane's 12-18 loss. In round 24, Flegler was sent to the sin bin during Brisbane's loss against Cronulla for a dangerous high tackle. On 31 August, Flegler was suspended by the NRL Judiciary for four matches in relation to the high tackle. In September, Flegler was involved in a fight with teammate Jordan Riki after a night out during Brisbane's Mad Monday celebrations. It was reported that Riki received a cut on his face.

In the 2022 NRL season, Flegler played a total of eighteen games for Brisbane. In round 27 of the 2023 NRL season, he captained the Brisbane Broncos against the Melbourne Storm at Suncorp Stadium and scored the first try of the match.

In May 2023, Flegler was selected to play for Queensland in Game I of the 2023 State of Origin series against New South Wales on 31 May at Adelaide Oval in South Australia. Flegler played a total of twenty-two games for Brisbane in the 2023 NRL season. In Brisbane's 24-26 loss to Penrith in the 2023 NRL Grand Final, he scored Brisbane's opening try of the match in the 39th minute. In October, Flegler was selected to play for Australia in the 2023 Pacific Championships.

=== Dolphins (2024-) ===
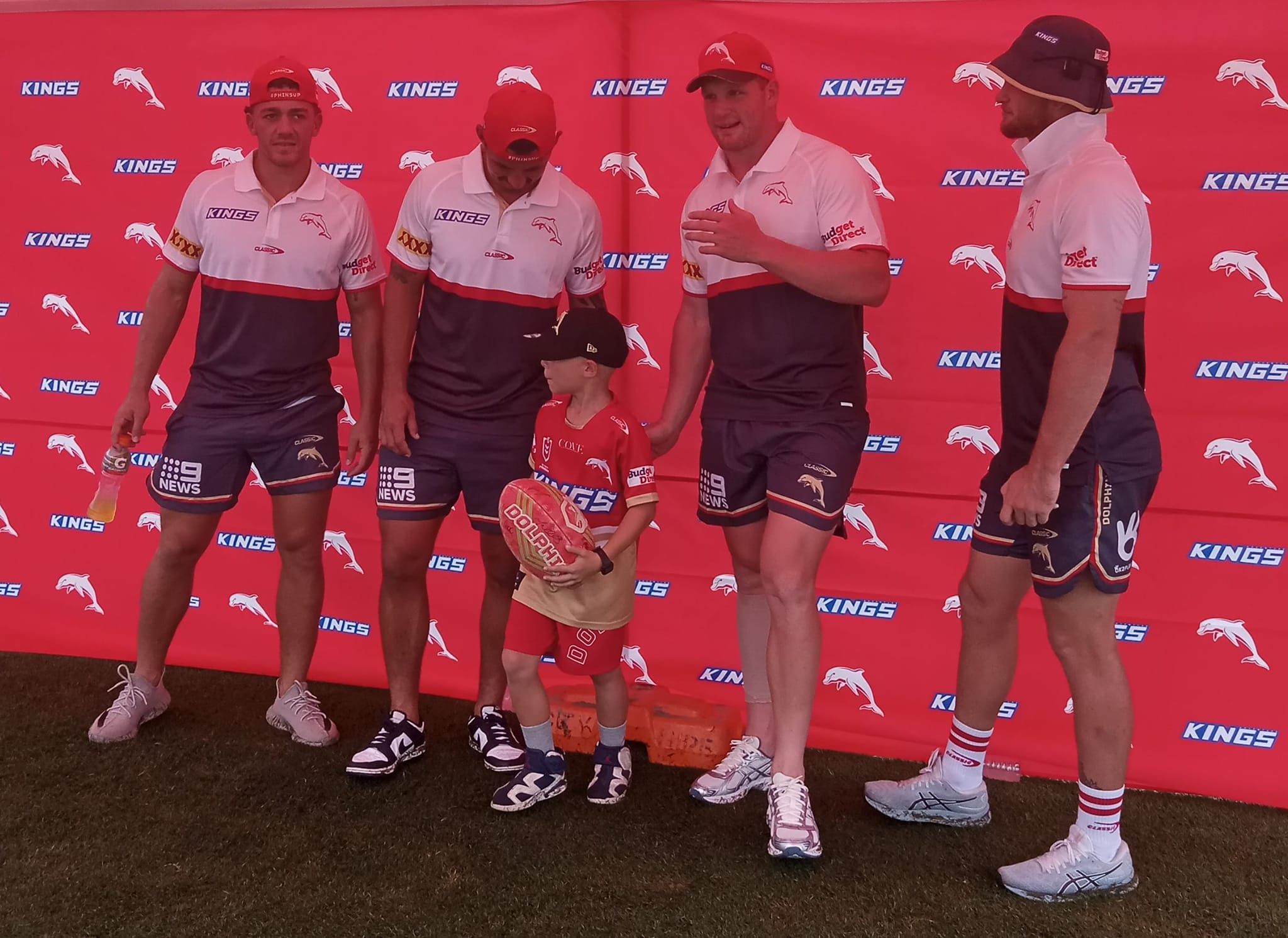
Flegler (second from right) with other Dolphins in 2024

In February 2023, Flegler signed a four-year contract to play for the Dolphins from the 2024 NRL season onwards.

Flegler was ruled out for the rest of the 2024 season after suffering a serious shoulder injury in round 5.

On 6 September, it was announced that Flegler had undergone nerve graft surgery six weeks prior in a bid to fix the issue in his shoulder.

On 8 March 2026, during round one of the NRL season. Flegler made his return to the field after more than 600 days out.

On May 18th, Flegler was selected as one of the starting front rowers for Queensland in Game One of the 2026 State of Origin series. He would score a try in this game under the same set of posts where he scored his grand final try three years before. He would retain his starting prop spot for the rest of the series as Queensland lost 2-1. Flegler played 21 matches for the club in the 2026 NRL season including their preliminary final loss to eventual premiers the Sydney Roosters. On 19 November 2026, the Cowboys announced that they had signed Flegler on a three year deal from 2028.

== Statistics ==
Year	Team	Games	Tries	Pts
2019	Brisbane Broncos	23	1	4
2020	Brisbane Broncos	13		
2021	Brisbane Broncos	20	1	4
2022	Brisbane Broncos	18		
2023	Brisbane Broncos	22	3	12
2024	Dolphins	4	1	4
2026	Dolphins	21		
2027	Dolphins			
	Totals	121	6	24
