= L'Indépendant (Pyrénées-Orientales) =

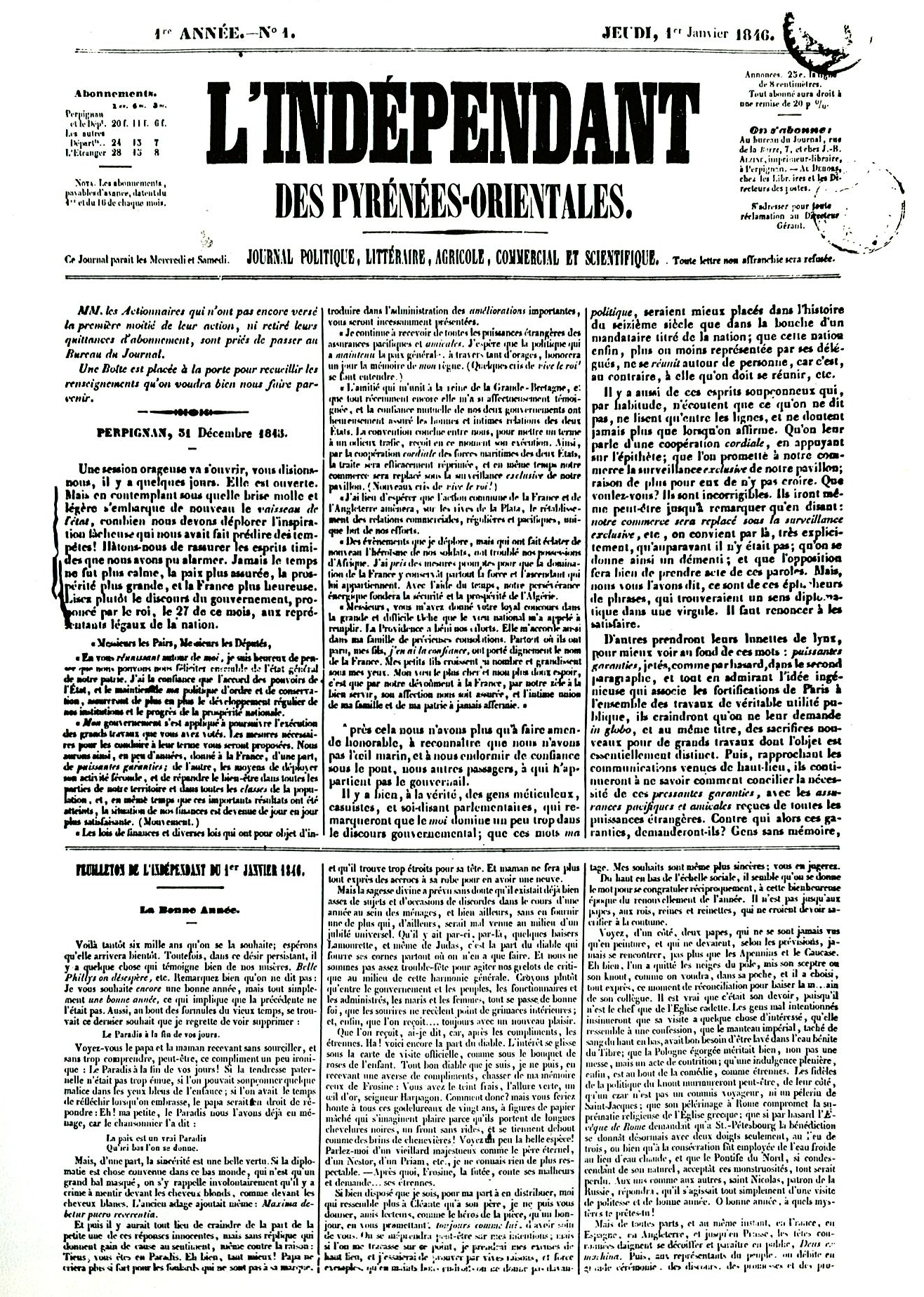
- First issue of L'Indépendant, dated 1 January 1846.
- Type: Daily
- Founded: 1 January 1846
- Language: French
- Headquarters: Perpignan
- City: Perpignan
- Country: France
- Circulation: 40,762 (as of 2020)
- ISSN: 0220-0058
- Website: www.lindependant.fr

L'Indépendant (French pronunciation: [lɛ̃depɑ̃dɑ̃]) is a regional newspaper from the South of France. It is published daily from its headquarters in Perpignan, and is mainly distributed in the Aude and Pyrénées-Orientales departments. It is owned by the Groupe Sud Ouest media group.

In 2020, the total circulation of L'Indépendant was 40,762 copies.

Year	Circulation
2015	48,224
2016	46,338
2017	44,520
2018	42,197
2019	40,505
2020	40,762
