= Temple Kalepo =

New Zealand professional rugby league player

Personal information
- Full name: Temple-Olympia Koloamatangi-Kalepo
- Born: 15 May 2001 (age 24); Auckland, New Zealand
- Height: 178 cm (5 ft 10 in)
- Weight: 86 kg (13 st 8 lb)

Playing information
- Position: Hooker
Club
Years	Team	Pld	T	G	FG	P
2025–	Nth Qld Cowboys	1	0	0	0	0
- Source: As of 10 August 2025

Temple-Olympia Koloamatangi-Kalepo (born 15 May 2001) is a New Zealand professional rugby league footballer who plays as a hooker for the North Queensland Cowboys in the National Rugby League (NRL).

== Background ==
Kalepo was born in Auckland, New Zealand, and is of Tongan descent.

He played his junior rugby league for the Ellerslie Eagles and attended Kings College, Auckland before being signed by the New Zealand Warriors.

== Playing career ==
=== Early career ===
In 2018, Kalepo played for the Warriors' under-20 Jersey Flegg Cup side and represented the New Zealand under-18s against Samoa under-18s.

In 2019, he again played for the Warriors' Jersey Flegg side and represented the Junior Kiwis, coming off the bench in their loss to the Australian Schoolboys rugby league team. In July 2019, he made his New South Wales Cup debut for the Warriors in a 34–8 win over the Newtown Jets.

In February 2020, he played for the Warriors at the NRL Nines in Perth.

In 2021, Kalepo underwent pre-season with the Warriors' NRL squad and played for the Redcliffe Dolphins under-21 side as part of the Warriors' partnership with the club.

After missing the 2022 season due to a serious hamstring injury, Kalepo spent the 2023 and 2024 seasons with the Newcastle Knights, playing for their NSW Cup side. In October 2023, he represented Tonga A in their loss to New Zealand A.

In 2024, when not playing NSW Cup, he played for the Kurri Kurri Bulldogs in the Newcastle Rugby League.

=== 2025 ===
Kalepo joined the Mackay Cutters for the 2025 season and underwent pre-season training with the North Queensland Cowboys on a train and trial contract.

In Round 18 of the 2025 NRL season, Kalepo made his NRL debut for the Cowboys against the Melbourne Storm.
