= Harrison Hassett =

Australian rugby league footballer

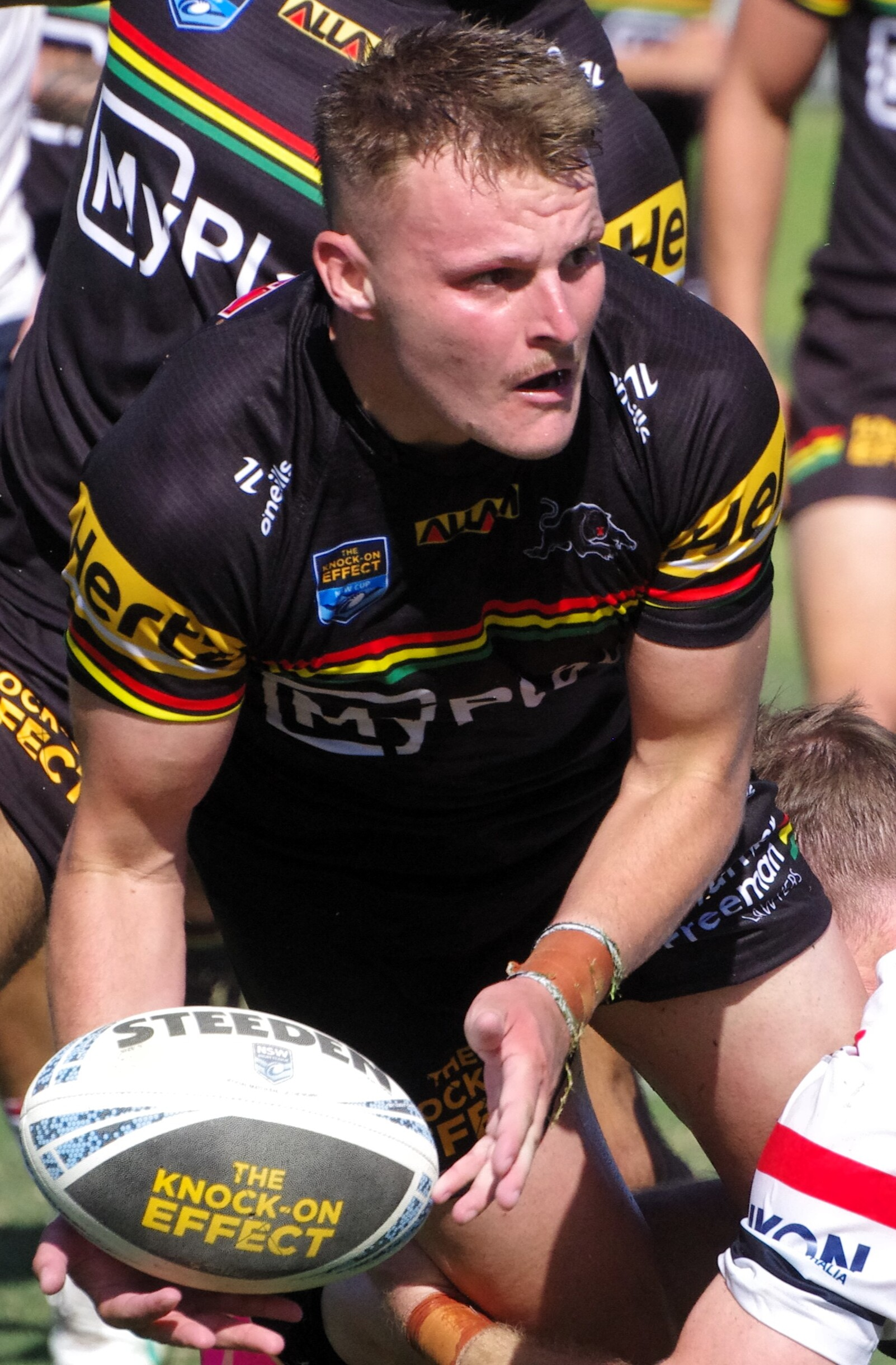

Personal information
- Full name: Harrison Hassett
- Born: 26 May 2004 (age 22)

Playing information
- Position: Second-row
Club
Years	Team	Pld	T	G	FG	P
2025	Penrith Panthers	1	1	0	0	4
2026–	Cronulla Sharks	0	0	0	0	0
	Total	1	1	0	0	4
- Source: As of 14 November 2026

Harrison Hassett is an Australian rugby league footballer who plays in the second-row for the Cronulla Sharks in the National Rugby League (NRL).

== Playing career ==
=== 2025 ===
Hassett made his first grade debut in round 12 against the Newcastle Knights off the bench. On 9 September, it was announced that Hassett would be departing Penrith at the end of the 2025 NRL season after not being offered a new contract by the club.

=== 2026 ===
On 26 September, he played for Newtown in their NSW Cup Grand Final loss against Penrith.
