= Billy Scott (rugby league) =

Australian rugby league footballer (born 2004)

Personal information
- Born: 3 September 2004 (age 22)

Playing information
- Position: Hooker
Club
Years	Team	Pld	T	G	FG	P
2026–	Penrith Panthers	9	0	0	0	0
- Source: RLP

Billy Scott (born 3 September 2004) is an Australian rugby league footballer for the Penrith Panthers in the National Rugby League (NRL).

== Early life ==
Scott was a Windsor Wolves junior and played schoolboy rugby league with Hills Sports High School.

== Career ==
A hooker, Scott featured in every junior age division with the Panthers and represented the 2023 New South Wales under-19s State of Origin side. He was promoted to the Panthers' Top 30 for the 2026 NRL season. With reserve hookers Soni Luke and Luke Sommerton having left the club, Scott was expected to break into first-grade and got his opportunity in the second half of the season when he made nine appearances off the bench, which included their qualifying final win over the Sydney Roosters.
