= Keaon Koloamatangi =

Tonga & Australia international rugby league footballer

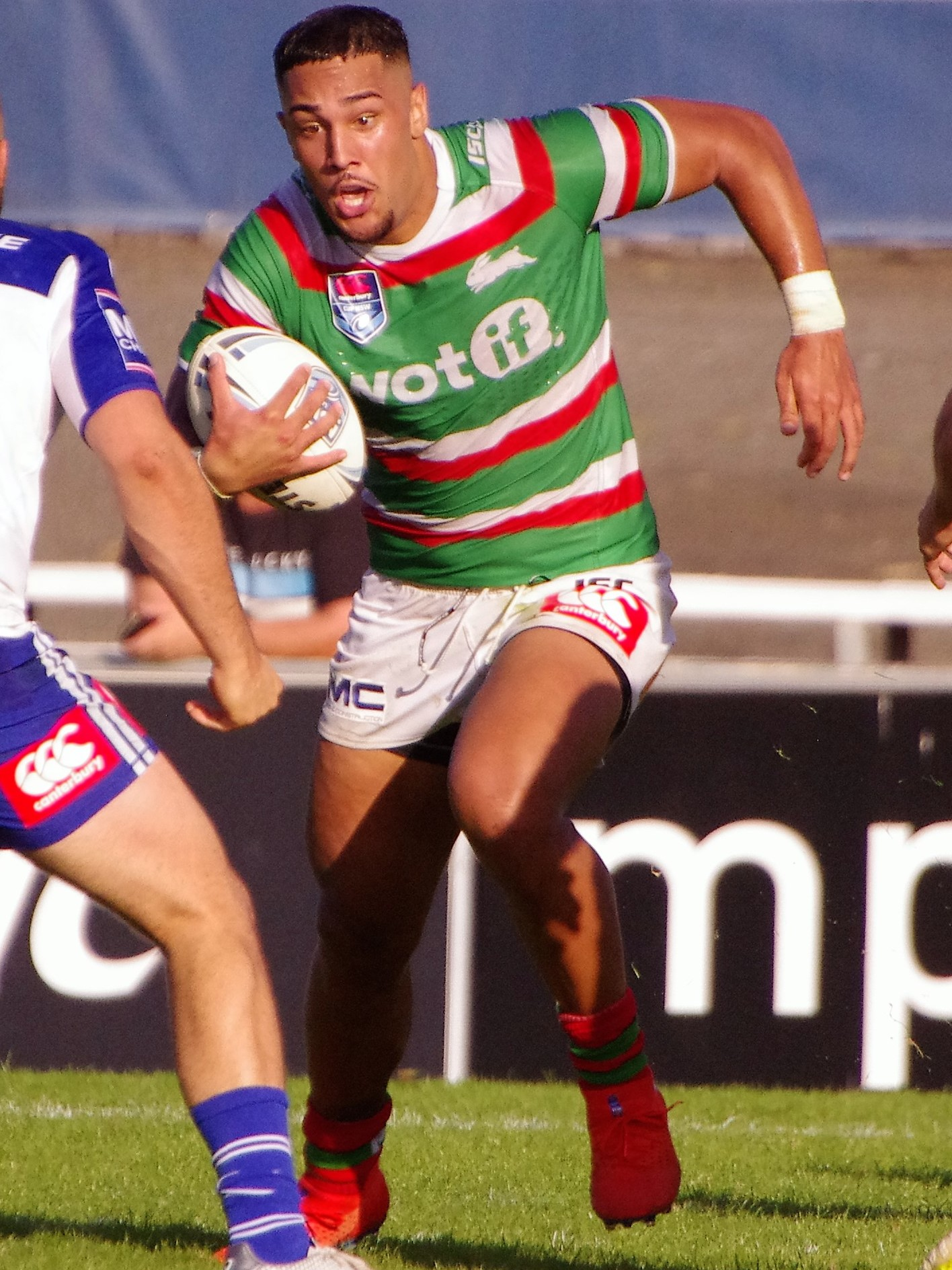

Personal information
- Full name: Keaon Koloamatangi
- Born: 23 May 1998 (age 28) Sydney, New South Wales, Australia
- Height: 191 cm (6 ft 3 in)
- Weight: 110 kg (17 st 5 lb)

Playing information
- Position: Second-row, Prop, Lock
Club
Years	Team	Pld	T	G	FG	P
2020–26	South Sydney	151	26	0	0	104
2027–	St. George Illawarra	0	0	0	0	0
	Total	151	26	0	0	104
Representative
Years	Team	Pld	T	G	FG	P
2019	NSW Residents	1	1	0	0	4
2022–24	Tonga	10	2	0	0	8
2023	New South Wales	1	0	0	0	0
2025	Prime Minister's XIII	1	0	0	0	0
2025–	Australia	8	0	0	0	0
- Source: As of 16 November 2026

Keaon Koloamatangi (born 23 May 1998), also known as Keta, is a professional rugby league footballer who plays as a second-row forward for the St. George Illawarra Dragons in the NRL. He has played for both Tonga and Australia at international level, winning the 2026 Rugby League World Cup with the latter.

== Early life ==
Koloamatangi grew up in Burwood, New South Wales idolising Sonny Bill Williams and Willie Mason but has been a South Sydney junior since he was a kid thanks to his dad Izzy. Keaon was a Mascot Jets junior and once said "Dad wanted me to play for Mascot because they always won! Instead of putting me in the Canterbury comp he wanted me in the Souths comp because he knew a lot of people, a lot of great players came from there." Keaon attended Ashfield Boys High School, he was an outstanding junior sportsman representing the school in a wide variety of sports including rugby union and still holds several school swimming records. Koloamatangi is of Tongan descent.

== Playing career ==
=== 2020 ===
Koloamatangi made first grade debut in round 4 of the 2020 NRL season for South Sydney (first grade player number 1157) against the Melbourne Storm.

He made a total of 14 appearances in his first season as the club reached another preliminary final but were defeated by Penrith at ANZ Stadium.

=== 2021 ===
In round 10 of the 2021 NRL season, Koloamatangi scored his first NRL try in South's 32-22 victory over the Cronulla-Sutherland Sharks at Suncorp Stadium. Midway through the season, Koloamatangi was selected as 20th man in the NSW Blues squad for the first game of the 2021 State of Origin series. He played a total of 23 games for South Sydney in the 2021 NRL season including the club's 2021 NRL Grand Final defeat against Penrith.

=== 2022 ===
He played 27 games for South Sydney in the 2022 NRL season including all three of the clubs finals matches as they reached the preliminary final for a fifth straight season. Souths would lose in the preliminary final to eventual premiers Penrith 32-12.

In October he was named in the Tonga squad for the 2021 Rugby League World Cup. In the opening match of Tonga's 2021 Rugby League World Cup campaign, Koloamatangi scored the winning try in Tonga's 24-18 victory over Papua New Guinea.

In November he was named in the 2021 RLWC Team of the Tournament.

=== 2023 ===
In round 7 of the 2023 NRL season, Koloamatangi was taken from the field during South Sydney's 36-14 victory over the Dolphins side with a leg injury and later ruled out for an indefinite period. On 3 July, he was selected for New South Wales for game 3 of the 2023 State of Origin series. Koloamatangi made his debut for New South Wales in game 3 which saw his team win 24-10 over Queensland. He played a total of 18 games for Souths in the 2023 NRL season as the club finished 9th on the table and missed the finals.

=== 2024 ===
In round 12 of the 2024 NRL season, he scored two tries for South Sydney in their upset 42-26 victory over Parramatta. It also broke South Sydney's eight game losing streak although the club would still remain bottom of the table. He played a total of 24 games for the club in the 2024 season as the club finished 16th on the table.

=== 2025 ===
In round 4 of the 2025 NRL season, he scored two tries for South Sydney in their upset 28-18 victory over Penrith. On 22 July, he was ruled out for the rest of the 2025 NRL season with a high-grade syndesmosis injury.

On 26 December 2025, it was reported that Koloamatangi had signed a long term deal with the St. George Illawarra Dragons from 2027. On 6 January 2026, St. George Illawarra officially announced the signing of Koloamatangi from 2027 until the end of the 2031 NRL season.

=== 2026 ===
He played 25 matches for South Sydney in the 2026 NRL season as the club finished 6th on the table and qualified for the finals. His last game for South Sydney was their elimination final loss to Newcastle.

== Statistics ==
Year	Team	Games	Tries	Pts
2020	South Sydney Rabbitohs	14		
2021	South Sydney Rabbitohs	23	3	12
2022	South Sydney Rabbitohs	27	7	28
2023	South Sydney Rabbitohs	18	5	20
2024	South Sydney Rabbitohs	24	5	20
2025	South Sydney Rabbitohs	20	4	16
2026	South Sydney Rabbitohs	18	1	4
2027	St. George Illawarra Dragons			
	Totals	144	25	100

== Honours ==
Representative

- Rugby League World Cup Champion: 2026
