= AJ Brimson =

England international rugby league footballer

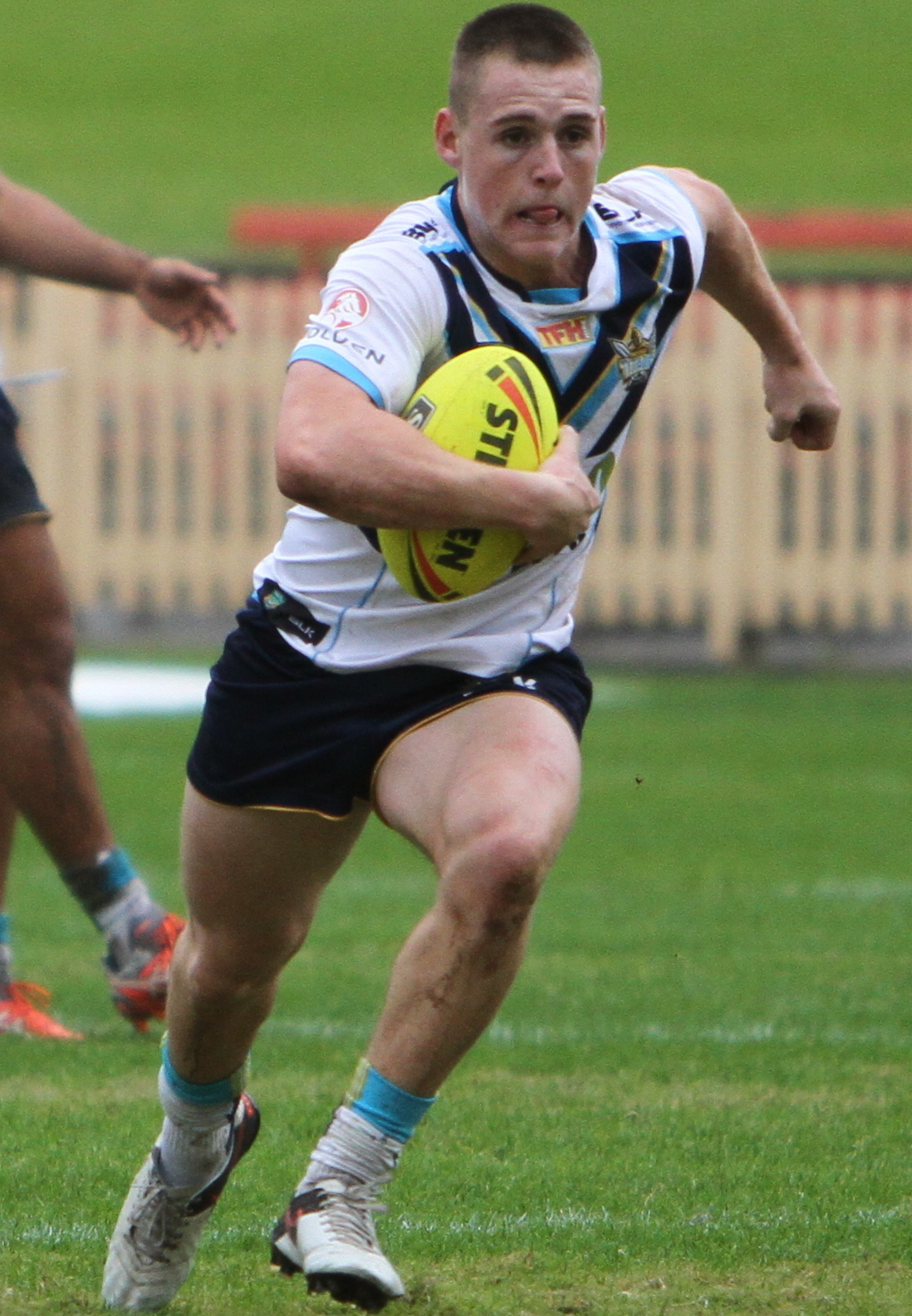

Personal information
- Full name: Alexander James Brimson
- Born: 9 September 1998 (age 28) Brisbane, Queensland, Australia
- Height: 181 cm (5 ft 11 in)
- Weight: 89 kg (14 st 0 lb)

Playing information
- Position: Fullback, Five-eighth, Centre
Club
Years	Team	Pld	T	G	FG	P
2018–	Gold Coast Titans	157	61	0	0	244
Representative
Years	Team	Pld	T	G	FG	P
2019	Australia 9s	5	2	0	0	9
2020–23	Queensland	4	1	0	0	4
2025–	England	5	3	0	0	12
- Source: As of 15 November 2026

Alexander James Brimson (born 9 September 1998) is an England international rugby league footballer who plays as a fullback, five-eighth and centre for the Gold Coast Titans in the National Rugby League (NRL).

Brimson made his NRL debut for the Titans in 2018. He has also played for Queensland in the State of Origin series and represented Australia at the 2019 Rugby League World Cup 9s. In 2025 he was granted permission to play for England, qualifying through his mother, and was subsequently called up to the England squad for the 2025 Ashes.

== Background ==
Brimson was born in Brisbane, Queensland, Australia and attended high school on the Gold Coast at Keebra Park State High School before signing with the Gold Coast Titans.

Brimson was the only one of his siblings to be born in Australia, with his brothers born in Chertsey, Surrey where his mother is also from. His maternal extended family still resides in South East England. His father, a native Australian, introduced Brimson to rugby league during his youth. His father died when Brimson was 12.

He played his junior rugby league at Centenary Panthers and Runaway Bay Seagulls. Brimson played predominantly touch football growing up making many representative teams. Brimson did not make a Rugby League representative side until under 16's.

He was an apprentice carpenter before he played his NRL debut in 2018.

== Club career ==
=== 2018 ===
Brimson made his NRL debut for the Gold Coast at five-eighth in round 10 of the 2018 NRL season against the Melbourne Storm. In round 11 of the 2018 NRL season against the Newcastle Knights, Brimson scored his first NRL try in the Gold Coast's 33–26 win at Robina Stadium. Brimson made a total of 15 appearances for the Gold Coast in 2018 as the club finished 14th on the table.

=== 2019 ===
Brimson made a total of 21 appearances and scored 4 tries for the Gold Coast in the 2019 NRL season as the club endured a horror year on and off the field. During the halfway mark of the season, head coach Garth Brennan was sacked by the club after a string of poor results. The Gold Coast managed to win only 4 games for the entire season and finished last claiming the Wooden Spoon.

=== 2020 ===
Brimson had an injury plagued 2020, where he had suffered a stress fracture in his back during pre-season, which then developed into a full blown broken back, putting him out for half of the season. He played nine games scoring seven tries in 2020, leading the Gold Coast to five straight wins to end the season, where his form granted him a spot in the Queensland Origin team.

On 4 November 2020, Brimson made his State of Origin debut at the Adelaide Oval, scoring a try in Queensland's 18–14 win in game 1 of the series. Despite being able to play out the game, Brimson suffered a foot injury in game 1, making him unavailable for the remainder of the series.

=== 2021 ===
On 17 August, Brimson was ruled out for an indefinite period after suffering a hairline fracture to his jaw in the Gold Coast's round 22 loss against South Sydney.

=== 2022 ===
In round 24 of the 2022 NRL season, Brimson scored two tries for the Gold Coast in their 36–26 victory against Newcastle. The win ensured that the Gold Coast would avoid the wooden spoon. Brimson played a total of 22 matches throughout the year as the club finished 13th on the table.

=== 2023 ===
On 2 May, it was announced that Brimson would be ruled out for at least six weeks with a hamstring injury that he suffered during the Gold Coast's victory over Manly. Brimson played a total of 14 games for the Gold Coast in the 2023 NRL season as the club finished 14th on the table.

=== 2024 ===
In round 9 of the 2024 NRL season, Brimson scored two tries as the Gold Coast defeated the New Zealand Warriors 27–24. It was the Gold Coast's first win of the season having lost their opening six matches. On 23 May, Brimson announced his re-signing with the Gold Coast Titans until the end of the 2030 season. Brimson played 13 games for the Gold Coast throughout the 2024 season as the club finished 14th on the table.

Following the 2024 season on 6 November 2024, the Titans referred an Instagram post made by Brimson to the NRL's Integrity Unit, after it appeared to show bets made on the NRL. The post made the night before and deleted shortly after had shown a winning bet on the Melbourne Cup, and also featured two other bets that had been partially obscured, although a Rugby ball was partially visible. Brimson's manager Jim Banaghan stated that it was a prank gone wrong, and that it was Brimson's mothers account and screenshot, as the winning horse had a similar name to his mother. NRL players are prohibited from betting on the NRL. On 14 November it was announced that Brimson was cleared of any wrongdoing and had no case to answer.

=== 2025 ===
In round 4 of the 2025 NRL season, Brimson scored two tries for the Gold Coast in their 30–12 victory over the Sydney Roosters.

Brimson played a total of 23 matches for the Gold Coast in the 2025 NRL season and scored 12 tries as the club narrowly avoided the wooden spoon on for and against finishing 16th.

=== 2026 ===
Brimson played 21 games for the Gold Coast in the 2026 NRL season as the club finished 16th on the table.

== International career ==
=== Australia ===
On 7 October 2019, Brimson earned his first representative jersey as he was named for the Australian side in the 2019 Rugby League World Cup 9s. A tournament Australia won, with Brimson scoring two tries across the tournament.

=== England ===
On 7 May 2025, an International Rugby League tribunal approved AJ Brimson to switch his eligibility from Australia to England, due to his mother having been born in England. The tribunal gave an exception to the rule preventing players from switching between tier one nations on the basis that Brimson's only caps for Australia were in the de facto defunct Rugby League World Cup 9s tournament, and ruled than any other players eligible for a second nation but locked into a first as a result of the 9s World Cup were also eligible to switch if they chose.

On 13 October 2025, Brimson was called up to the England squad to face Australia in the 2025 Ashes, making his debut in the second Test of the series.

== Statistics ==
Year	Team	Games	Tries	Points
2018	Gold Coast Titans	15	7	28
2019	Gold Coast Titans	21	4	16
2020	Gold Coast Titans	9	7	28
2021	Gold Coast Titans	18	7	28
2022	Gold Coast Titans	22	9	36
2023	Gold Coast Titans	14	4	16
2024	Gold Coast Titans	13	5	20
2025	Gold Coast Titans	21	12	48
2026	Gold Coast Titans	20	4	16
2027	Gold Coast Titans			
	Totals	155	59	236

== Honours ==
=== Individual ===
- Gold Coast Titans U20s Player Of The Year: 2017
- Gold Coast Titans Rookie Of The Year: 2018
- Gold Coast Titans Members MVP: 2020, 2022
- Corporal Cameron Baird VC MG trophy: 2021
- Gold Coast Titans Coach's Award: 2022
- Gold Coast Titans Player Of The Year: 2025

=== Representative ===
- Rugby League 9s World Cup Champion: 2019
- State Of Origin Series Winner: 2020, 2023
