= Aktienbrauerei Kaufbeuren =

German brewery

- Interactive map of Aktienbrauerei Kaufbeuren
- Location: Kaufbeuren, Bavaria, Germany Hohe Buchleute 3
- Coordinates: 47°52′38″N 10°37′3″E
- Opened: 1308
- Key people: Jonathan Kendrick, Alexey Dozhdalev, Gottfried Csauth
- Annual production volume: 100,000 hectolitres (85,000 US bbl)
- Website: aktienbrauerei.de

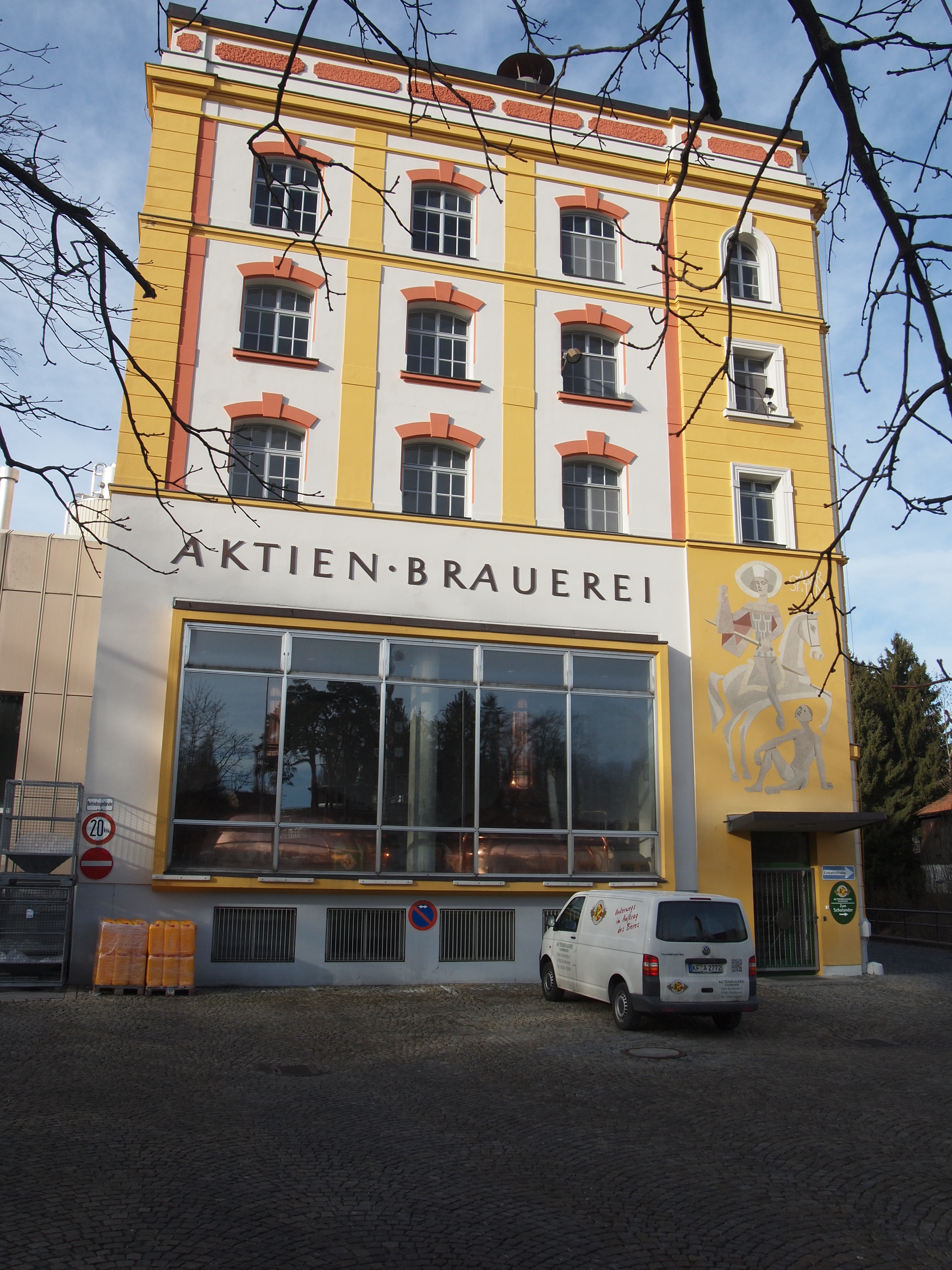
Aktienbrauerei building in Kaufbeuren

Aktienbrauerei Kaufbeuren is a brewery in the town of Kaufbeuren, Germany. It is the oldest brewery in Swabia, mentioned in official records from the year 1308. It is a joint stock company with shares traded on the Munich stock exchange.

== History ==
A document from 1308 records that Heinrich der Twinger – a Kaufbeuren citizen – bequeathed all his property to the town's Holy Ghost Hospice including his brewhouse. This formed the basis of what became the Aktien brewery in Kaufbeuren. The name changed over the centuries as it bought up other producers, with its current name dating back to 1920. Aktienbrauerei means literally "share brewery", meaning that it is owned by its shareholders.

The Kaufbeuren Brewers Guild was formed in 1325 making a declaration that all beers produced in the town could only use barley, hops, and pure water. All other ingredients were banned. This pre-dated the Bavarian Reinheitsgebot (Purity Order) of 1516 by almost 200 years. In the 17th century the brewery became one of the first in Bavaria to offer wheat ales, a speciality previously reserved for Bavarian royalty. Today’s brewery buildings with deep cellars were built in 1807. Aktien Brewery won several international beer competitions from the late 1800s on. It continues to use locally grown Hallertau hops and grains from the same farms they have been using for over 700 years.

In 1997, it bought out the Rosen-Brauerei, its last remaining competitor in Kaufbeuren. The start of the 2000s saw changes of trading names and of ownership of the majority of the company's shares. In 2004/2005 it reported an operating loss of around 600,000 Euros.

In 2013, US billionaire John Paul DeJoria took a 55% stake in the company, acquiring the remaining 45% in September 2017. The brewery forms part of DeJoria's ROKit group of companies through which it is marketed internationally under the name ABK Beer, appearing on Williams Formula One racing cars in 2019.

== See also ==
- List of oldest companies
