= Nic Lenaz =

Italy international rugby league player

Personal information
- Full name: Nicholas Lenaz
- Born: 3 March 2003 (age 23) Sydney, New South Wales, Australia

Playing information
- Position: Hooker, Lock
Club
Years	Team	Pld	T	G	FG	P
2025	Nth Qld Cowboys	1	0	0	0	0
2026	Manly Sea Eagles	4	0	0	0	0
	Total	5	0	0	0	0
Representative
Years	Team	Pld	T	G	FG	P
2023	Italy	5	2	0	0	8
- Source: As of 23 October 2026

Nicholas Lenaz is an Australian rugby league footballer who plays for the Manly Warringah Sea Eagles.

== Background ==
Lenaz is of Italian descent, with his grandparents from Milan and Trieste.

He played his junior rugby league for the Hills District Bulls and attended Castle Hill High School. His older sister, Josie, previously played for the Wests Tigers in the NRLW.

== Playing career ==
=== Early career ===
In 2019, Lenaz played for the Penrith Panthers in the Harold Matthews Cup. In 2021, Lenaz joined the Parramatta Eels, spending two seasons playing for their SG Ball Cup side.

In 2022, he moved up to the Eels' Jersey Flegg Cup side and, in 2023, was named their Jersey Flegg Player of the Year. That season, he played two NSW Cup for the Eels.

On 7 October 2023, Lenaz made his Test debut for Italy in their 38–12 win over Malta. On 28 October 2023, he scored his first try for Italy in a 50–20 win over South Africa.

In 2024, Lenaz joined the Manly Sea Eagles, where he captained their Jersey Flegg side and won the club's Best & Fairest award at the end of the season.

=== 2025 ===
In 2025, Lenaz joined the North Queensland Cowboys on a pre-season train and trial deal before eventually earning a full-time contract for the rest of the season.

In Round 23 of the 2025 NRL season, after spending the majority of the season with the Northern Pride in the Queensland Cup, Lenaz was named to make his NRL debut against the Parramatta Eels.

On 3 September, he was announced as one of seven players departing the Cowboys at the end of the 2025 season.

In October he was named in the Italy squad to face Lebanon in Sydney.

He is currently signed with the Manly Warringah Sea Eagles on a mid-season transfer/supplementary contract for the 2026 season. He operates within the club's broader NRL and NSW Cup squad.
