= Jamal Shibasaki =

Australian professional rugby league player

Personal information
- Born: 7 June 2005 (age 21) Townsville, Queensland, Australia
- Height: 186 cm (6 ft 1 in)
- Weight: 105 kg (16 st 7 lb)

Playing information
- Position: Second-row, Prop
Club
| Years | Team | Pld | T | G | FG | P |
|---|---|---|---|---|---|---|
| 2024–25 | North Qld Cowboys | 2 | 0 | 0 | 0 | 0 |
- Source: As of 3 August 2025
- Education: Ignatius Park College
- Relatives: Enemarki Shibasaki (brother); Gehamat Shibasaki (brother)

Jamal Shibasaki (born 7 June 2005) is an Australian rugby league footballer who last played as a second-rower for the North Queensland Cowboys in the National Rugby League (NRL).

== Background ==
Born in Townsville, Queensland, Shibasaki is of Torres Strait Islander and Japanese descent. He is the younger brother of Brisbane Broncos player Gehamat Shibasaki.

He played his junior rugby league for Townsville Brothers and attended Ignatius Park College before being signed by the Brisbane Broncos.

== Playing career ==
=== Early career ===
In 2021, Shibasaki played for the Townsville Blackhawks in the under-16 Cyril Connell Challenge competition, scoring four tries in four games. In 2022, he moved up to their under-18 Mal Meninga Cup side, starting at second-row in their Grand Final loss to the Souths Logan Magpies. In September 2022, Shibasaki signed with the North Queensland Cowboys.

In 2023, he began the year captaining the Blackhawks' Mal Meninga Cup side, being named the competition's Player of the Year at the end of the season.

In May 2023, Shibasaki, aged just 17 years and 339 days, made his Queensland Cup debut for the Blackhawks in their 54–4 win over the PNG Hunters. In July 2023, he represented Queensland under-19, coming off the bench in their loss to New South Wales. On 17 September 2023, he started at second-row in Townsville's under-21 Colts Grand Final win over the Brisbane Tigers.

=== 2024 ===
Shibasaki joined the Cowboys' NRL squad ahead of the 2024 season. He began the season playing for the Mackay Cutters in the Queensland Cup.

In Round 13 of the 2024 NRL season, he made his NRL debut off the bench against the Sydney Roosters.

=== 2025 ===
Shibasaki played just one NRL game in 2025 before the club announced he would be departing at the end of the season.
