= 2024 North Queensland Cowboys season =

Season of rugby league team

- NRL Rank: 5th
- Play-off result: SF
- 2024 record: Wins: 15; losses: 9
- Points scored: For: 657; against: 568

Team information
- CEO: Jeff Reibel
- Coach: Todd Payten
- Captain: Reuben Cotter Tom Dearden
- Stadium: Queensland Country Bank Stadium
- Avg. attendance: 19,701
- High attendance: 24,861 (vs. Newcastle, Finals Week 1)

Top scorers
- Tries: Kyle Feldt (23)
- Goals: Valentine Holmes (99)
- Points: Valentine Holmes (254)
← 2023	2025 →

The 2024 North Queensland Cowboys season was the 30th in the club's history. Coached by Todd Payten and captained by Reuben Cotter and Tom Dearden, they competed in the NRL's 2024 Telstra Premiership. Cotter and Dearden captained the club for the first time, replacing Jason Taumalolo and Chad Townsend.

== Season summary ==
=== Milestones ===
- Round 4: Reece Robson played his 100th NRL game.
- Round 5: Jake Granville played his 200th NRL game for the club.
- Round 5: Kyle Feldt scored his 131st try, becoming the club's all-time leading tryscorer.
- Round 6: Scott Drinkwater played his 100th NRL game.
- Round 7: Scott Drinkwater played his 100th NRL game for the club.
- Round 7: Griffin Neame played his 50th NRL game for the club.
- Round 8: Tom Mikaele made his debut for the club.
- Round 8: Kyle Feldt played his 200th NRL game for the club.
- Round 8: Chad Townsend played his 250th NRL game.
- Round 9: Viliami Vailea made his debut for the club.
- Round 10: Harrison Edwards made his debut for the club.
- Round 10: Jeremiah Nanai played his 50th NRL game for the club.
- Round 11: Braidon Burns made his debut and scored his first try for the club.
- Round 11: Viliami Vailea scored his first try for the club.
- Round 11: Sam McIntyre played his 50th NRL game.
- Round 13: Jaxon Purdue and Jamal Shibasaki made their NRL debuts.
- Round 15: Reece Robson played his 100th NRL game for the club.
- Round 15: Valentine Holmes scored his 100th NRL try.
- Round 17: Jaxon Purdue scored his first NRL try.
- Round 20: Heilum Luki played his 50th NRL game for the club.
- Round 24: Tom Dearden played his 100th NRL game.
- Round 26: Valentine Holmes played his 200th NRL game.
- Round 27: Kyle Feldt scored his 150th NRL try.

=== Squad ===
North Queensland Cowboys 2024 squad
Top 30 squad – 2024 NRL season			Supplementary list	Coaching staff
Braidon Burns – WG; Tom Chester – CE; Jake Clifford – HB; Reuben Cotter (c) – LK; Tom Dearden (c) – FE; Rob Derby – WG; Scott Drinkwater – FB; Tom Duffy – HB; Harrison Edwards – LK; Kyle Feldt – WG	Kulikefu Finefeuiaki – SR; Jake Granville – LK; Coen Hess – PR; Valentine Holmes – CE; Zac Laybutt – CE; Heilum Luki – SR; Sam McIntyre – LK; Jordan McLean – PR; Tom Mikaele – PR; Jeremiah Nanai – SR	Griffin Neame – PR; D'Jazirhae Pua'avase – SR; Reece Robson – HK; Murray Taulagi – WG; Jason Taumalolo – PR; Jamayne Taunoa-Brown – LK; Chad Townsend – HB; Viliami Vailea – CE; Semi Valemei – WG	Jodeci Baker-Tiraha – CE; Emarly Bitungane – PR; Jai Hansen – HK; Kaiden Lahrs – PR; Jamal Shibasaki – SR; Extended squad: Jaxon Purdue – HB; Wil Sullivan – SR	Head coach: Todd Payten; Assistant coaches: Justin Morgan; James Maloney; Ben Rauter; Paul Bowman (Head of Performance); Ashley Graham (Strength & Conditioning); Mark Henry (Strength & Conditioning); James Moran (Strength & Conditioning); Steve Sartori (Physiotherapist); Legend: (c) Captain(s); (vc) Vice-captain(s); Development players; Extended squad; Updated: 8 May 2024; Source(s): NQ Cowboys

== Squad movement ==
=== Gains ===
Player	Signed from	Until end of	Notes
Braidon Burns	South Sydney Rabbitohs (mid-season)	2025	
Jake Clifford	Hull F.C.	2024	
Harrison Edwards	Canterbury Bulldogs (mid-season)	2026	
Tom Mikaele	Warrington Wolves	2024	
Viliami Vailea	New Zealand Warriors	2025	

=== Losses ===
Player	Signed to	Until end of	Notes
Jake Bourke	Townsville Blackhawks	2024	
Mitch Dunn	Retired	–	
Brendan Elliot	Retired	–	
Jack Gosiewski	Brisbane Broncos (mid-season)	2025	
Ben Hampton	Retired	–	
Peta Hiku	Hull Kingston Rovers	2026	
Luciano Leilua	St George Illawarra Dragons	2026	
Sylvester Namo	Castleford Tigers	2025	
Riley Price	Penrith Panthers	2025	
Taniela Sadrugu	CA Brive	2024	
Gehamat Shibasaki	Townsville Blackhawks	2024	
James Tamou	Townsville Blackhawks	2024	
Ragarive Wavik	Canterbury Bulldogs	2024	

=== Re-signings ===
Player	Until End of	Notes
Coen Hess	2027	
Heilum Luki	2029	
Sam McIntyre	2026	
Tom Mikaele	2027	

== Ladder ==
Pos	Team	Pld	W	D	L	B	PF	PA	PD	Pts	Qualification
1	Melbourne Storm	24	19	0	5	3	692	449	+243	44	Advance to finals series
2	Penrith Panthers (P)	24	17	0	7	3	580	394	+186	40	Advance to finals series
3	Sydney Roosters	24	16	0	8	3	738	463	+275	38	Advance to finals series
4	Cronulla-Sutherland Sharks	24	16	0	8	3	653	431	+222	38	Advance to finals series
5	North Queensland Cowboys	24	15	0	9	3	657	568	+89	36	Advance to finals series
6	Canterbury-Bankstown Bulldogs	24	14	0	10	3	529	433	+96	34	Advance to finals series
7	Manly Warringah Sea Eagles	24	13	1	10	3	634	521	+113	33	Advance to finals series
8	Newcastle Knights	24	12	0	12	3	470	510	−40	30	Advance to finals series
9	Canberra Raiders	24	12	0	12	3	474	601	−127	30	
10	Dolphins	24	11	0	13	3	577	578	−1	28	
11	St. George Illawarra Dragons	24	11	0	13	3	508	634	−126	28	
12	Brisbane Broncos	24	10	0	14	3	537	607	−70	26	
13	New Zealand Warriors	24	9	1	14	3	512	574	−62	25	
14	Gold Coast Titans	24	8	0	16	3	488	656	−168	22	
15	Parramatta Eels	24	7	0	17	3	561	716	−155	20	
16	South Sydney Rabbitohs	24	7	0	17	3	494	682	−188	20	
17	Wests Tigers	24	6	0	18	3	463	750	−287	18	

Source: National Rugby League
(P) Premiers

== Fixtures ==
=== Pre-season ===
Date	Round	Opponent	Venue	Score	Tries	Goals	Attendance
Saturday, 18 February	Trial 1	Brisbane Broncos	BB Print Stadium	20–46	Finefeuiaki, Mullany, Purdue, Valemei	Mullany (1/1), Purdue (1/1), Duffy (0/2)	5,332
Sunday, 25 February	Trial 2	Canberra Raiders	Seiffert Oval	36–26	Feldt (3), Mikaele (2), Laybutt, Taulagi	Holmes (2/4), Drinkwater (1/2), Laybutt (1/1)	6,048
Legend: Win Loss Draw Bye

=== Regular season ===
==== Results by round ====
Round	1	2	3	4	5	6	7	8	9	10	11	12	13	14	15	16	17	18	19	20	21	22	23	24	25	26	27
Ground	A	H	A	A	H	A	A	H	H	A	N	H	A	H	A	–	A	H	–	H	H	A	H	H	–	H	A
Result	W	W	W	L	W	L	L	L	L	L	W	W	W	L	W	B	W	L	B	W	W	W	L	W	B	W	W
Position	1	2	1	3	2	4	8	9	10	12	12	11	10	12	10	8	7	8	8	8	6	6	7	7	6	6	5
Points	2	4	6	6	8	8	8	8	8	8	10	12	14	14	16	18	20	20	22	24	26	28	28	30	32	34	36

Source: National Rugby League
A = Away; H = Home; N = Neutral; B = Bye; W = Win; D = Draw; L = Loss

==== Matches ====
Date	Round	Opponent	Venue	Score	Tries	Goals	Attendance
Sunday, 10 March	Round 1	Dolphins	Suncorp Stadium	43–18	Laybutt (2), Dearden, Feldt, Luki, Nanai, Taulagi	Holmes (7/7), Townsend (1 FG)	32,477
Saturday, 16 March	Round 2	Newcastle Knights	QCB Stadium	21–20 (g.p.)	Dearden, Feldt, Nanai, Townsend	Holmes (3/5), Townsend (1 FG)	18,986
Saturday, 23 March	Round 3	St. George Illawarra Dragons	Netstrata Jubilee Stadium	46–24	Taulagi, McIntyre, Neame, Drinkwater, Finefeuiaki, Dearden, Holmes, Townsend	Holmes (7/8)	9,252
Friday, 29 March	Round 4	Brisbane Broncos	Suncorp Stadium	12–38	Holmes, Drinkwater	Holmes (2/2)	45,793
Sunday, 7 April	Round 5	Gold Coast Titans	QCB Stadium	35–22	Laybutt, Taulagi, Drinkwater (2), Robson, Feldt	Holmes (5/6), Townsend (1 FG)	18,870
Saturday, 13 April	Round 6	Parramatta Eels	CommBank Stadium	20–27	Nanai, Chester, Holmes, Drinkwater	Holmes (2/4)	14,443
Sunday, 21 April	Round 7	Cronulla-Sutherland Sharks	PointsBet Stadium	6–42	Holmes	Holmes (1/1)	12,415
Saturday, 27 April	Round 8	Penrith Panthers	QCB Stadium	20–26	Valemei, Holmes, Finefeuiaki, Nanai	Holmes (2/4)	20,960
Saturday, 4 May	Round 9	Dolphins	QCB Stadium	26–28	Feldt, Cotter, Nanai (2), McIntyre	Holmes (3/5)	20,967
Sunday, 12 May	Round 10	Gold Coast Titans	Cbus Super Stadium	18–20	Nanai (2), Feldt	Holmes (3/3)	12,125
Saturday, 18 May	Round 11	South Sydney Rabbitohs	Suncorp Stadium	28–22	Burns (2), Dearden (2), Vailea	Holmes (4/6)	50,708
Friday, 24 May	Round 12	Wests Tigers	QCB Stadium	42–28	Feldt (2), Holmes (2), Nanai (2), McIntyre	Holmes (7/8)	15,947
Sunday, 2 June	Round 13	Sydney Roosters	Allianz Stadium	18–16	Burns, Drinkwater, Finefeuiaki	Drinkwater (3/5)	13,811
Saturday, 8 June	Round 14	New Zealand Warriors	QCB Stadium	12–42	Drinkwater, Burns	Holmes (2/2)	19,623
Friday, 14 June	Round 15	Canberra Raiders	GIO Stadium	34–16	Feldt (2), Luki, Nanai, Holmes, Robson	Holmes (5/6)	9,671
	Round 16	Bye					
Sunday, 30 June	Round 17	Penrith Panthers	BlueBet Stadium	16–6	Feldt, Burns, Purdue	Holmes (2/3)	15,777
Saturday, 6 July	Round 18	Manly Warringah Sea Eagles	QCB Stadium	20–21 (g.p.)	Townsend, Cotter, Feldt	Holmes (3/3), Drinkwater (1 2pt FG)	18,787
	Round 19	Bye					
Sunday, 21 July	Round 20	Canterbury-Bankstown Bulldogs	QCB Stadium	20–18	Luki (2), Purdue	Holmes (4/4)	16,376
Saturday, 27 July	Round 21	Cronulla-Sutherland Sharks	QCB Stadium	30–22	Feldt (3), Nanai, Taulagi	Holmes (5/6)	17,907
Thursday, 1 August	Round 22	Wests Tigers	Leichhardt Oval	48–30	Taulagi (3), Drinkwater (2), Dearden, Feldt, Holmes	Holmes (7/8), Drinkwater (1/1)	7,231
Saturday, 10 August	Round 23	Brisbane Broncos	QCB Stadium	18–42	Dearden, Feldt, Vailea	Holmes (3/3)	24,230
Saturday, 17 August	Round 24	Canberra Raiders	QCB Stadium	42–4	Holmes (3), Feldt (2), Clifford, Dearden	Holmes (7/7)	17,920
	Round 25	Bye					
Thursday, 29 August	Round 26	Melbourne Storm	QCB Stadium	38–30	Feldt (2), Taulagi, Holmes, Robson, Nanai	Holmes (7/7)	20,787
Saturday, 7 September	Round 27	Canterbury-Bankstown Bulldogs	Accor Stadium	44–6	Feldt (2), Taulagi (2), Drinkwater, Holmes, Luki	Holmes (8/8)	32,437
Legend: Win Loss Draw Bye

=== Finals ===
Date	Round	Opponent	Venue	Score	Tries	Goals	Attendance
Sunday, 14 September	Elimination	Newcastle Knights	QCB Stadium	28–16	Cotter, Dearden, Feldt, McLean, Taulagi	Holmes (4/5)	24,861
Friday, 20 September	Semi	Cronulla-Sutherland Sharks	Allianz Stadium	18–26	Holmes (2), Cotter	Valentine Holmes (2/2), Drinkwater (1/1)	19,124
Legend: Win Loss Draw

== Statistics ==
Name	App	T	G	FG	Pts
Braidon Burns	4	5	-	-	20
Tom Chester	5	1	-	-	4
Jake Clifford	7	1	1	-	6
Reuben Cotter	22	3	-	-	12
Tom Dearden	23	9	-	-	36
Scott Drinkwater	25	10	6	1	54
Harrison Edwards	14	-	-	-	-
Kyle Feldt	24	23	-	-	92
Kulikefu Finefeuiaki	24	3	-	-	12
Jack Gosiewski	5	-	-	-	-
Jake Granville	12	-	-	-	-
Valentine Holmes	23	14	99	-	254
Zac Laybutt	4	3	-	-	12
Heilum Luki	18	5	-	-	20
Sam McIntyre	25	3	-	-	12
Jordan McLean	21	1	-	-	4
Tom Mikaele	12	-	-	-	-
Jeremiah Nanai	22	13	-	-	52
Griffin Neame	25	1	-	-	4
Jaxon Purdue	9	2	-	-	8
Reece Robson	22	3	-	-	12
Jamal Shibasaki	1	-	-	-	-
Murray Taulagi	17	11	-	-	44
Jason Taumalolo	22	-	-	-	-
Chad Townsend	20	3	-	3	15
Viliami Vailea	17	2	-	-	8
Semi Valemei	4	1	-	-	4
Totals		117	106	4	685

== Representatives ==
The following players played a representative match in 2024.

	State of Origin 1	State of Origin 2	State of Origin 3	Prime Minister's XIII	Pacific Championships	Samoa tour of England
Reuben Cotter	Queensland	Queensland	Queensland		Australia	
Tom Dearden	Queensland	Queensland	Queensland		Australia	
Robert Derby					Papua New Guinea	
Valentine Holmes	Queensland	Queensland	Queensland			
Sam McIntyre				Australia		
Jeremiah Nanai	Queensland	Queensland	Queensland			Samoa
Griffin Neame					New Zealand	
Reece Robson	New South Wales	New South Wales	New South Wales			
Murray Taulagi	Queensland	Queensland	Queensland			
Jason Taumalolo					Tonga	
Semi Valemei					Fiji	

== Awards ==
- Player of the Year (Paul Bowman Medal) - Tom Dearden
- Players' Player - Tom Dearden
- Cowboys Way award - Jake Granville
- Townsville Bulletin Fan Award - Tom Dearden
- Rookie of the Year - Jaxon Purdue
- Affiliate Club Player of the Year - Tom Duffy (Northern Pride)
- Young Guns Cowboys Way award - Henry Teutau
- Club Person of the Year - Coen Hess

== Feeder clubs ==
=== Queensland Cup ===
- Mackay Cutters – 12th, missed finals
- Northern Pride – 1st, lost preliminary final

== Women's team ==
The North Queensland Cowboys Women's team competed in their second season of the NRL Women's Premiership in 2024. They finished 6th, three places higher than the previous season. They were coached by Ricky Henry and captained by Kirra Dibb and Tallisha Harden.
