= List of North Queensland Cowboys records =

This is a list of North Queensland Cowboys records since they entered the Australian Rugby League in 1995. These stats are correct as of the conclusion of the 2026 season.

== Individual records ==
=== Player of the year (Paul Bowman Medal) ===
Year	Player
2026	Reuben Cotter
2025	Tom Dearden (2)
2024	Tom Dearden
2023	Scott Drinkwater
2022	Jason Taumalolo (6)
2021	Coen Hess
2020	Jason Taumalolo (5)
2019	Jason Taumalolo (4)
2018	Jason Taumalolo (3)
2017	Jason Taumalolo (2)
2016	Jason Taumalolo
2015	Johnathan Thurston (4)
2014	Johnathan Thurston (3)
2013	Matt Scott (2)
2012	Johnathan Thurston (2)
2011	Ashley Graham
2010	Matt Scott
2009	Luke O'Donnell (2)
2008	Aaron Payne (2)
2007	Matt Bowen
2006	Aaron Payne
2005	Johnathan Thurston
2004	Luke O'Donnell
2003	Paul Rauhihi
2002	Matt Sing
2001	Glenn Morrison
2000	Paul Bowman (2) & Julian O'Neill
1999	Paul Bowman
1998	John Lomax
1997	Owen Cunningham
1996	Steve Edmed
1995	Wayne Sing

=== Most first grade games ===
Games	Player	Years
309	Jason Taumalolo	2010–present
294	Johnathan Thurston	2005−2018
270	Matthew Bowen	2001−2013
268	Matthew Scott	2004−2019
247	Gavin Cooper	2006, 2011−2020
246	Scott Bolton	2007−2019
219	Aaron Payne	2002−2012
217	Kyle Feldt	2013−2024
211	Coen Hess	2015–present
207	Jake Granville	2015−2024
203	Paul Bowman	1995−2007

=== Most points for the club ===
Points	Player	Tries	Goals	1 point field goals	2 point field goals
2,182	Johnathan Thurston	80	923	16	0
882	Josh Hannay	49	343	0	0
871	Valentine Holmes	42	347	5	2
692	Kyle Feldt	151	44	0	0
597	Matthew Bowen	130	36	5	0
521	Scott Drinkwater	63	132	3	1
386	Ashley Graham	84	25	0	0
340	Ty Williams	85	0	0	0
312	Antonio Winterstein	78	0	0	0
300	Julian O'Neill	14	122	0	0

=== Most tries for the club ===
Tries	Player
151	Kyle Feldt
130	Matthew Bowen
85	Ty Williams
84	Ashley Graham
80	Johnathan Thurston
78	Antonio Winterstein
73	Matt Sing
72	Gavin Cooper
72	Murray Taulagi
63	Scott Drinkwater
62	Paul Bowman

=== Most tries in a match ===
Tries	Player	Match details
4	Ray Mercy	v Balmain, Malanda Stadium – Rd 2, 1998. North Queensland won 26-2.

=== Most points in a match ===
Points	Player	Match details
30 (2 tries, 11 goals)	Valentine Holmes	v Wests Tigers, Queensland Country Bank Stadium – Rd 18, 2023. North Queensland won 74-0.
26 (3 tries, 7 goals)	Valentine Holmes	v Canberra, Queensland Country Bank Stadium – Rd 24, 2024. North Queensland won 42-4.
24 (2 tries, 8 goals)	Johnathan Thurston	v Melbourne, Dairy Farmers Stadium – Rd 3, 2008. North Queensland won 40-8.
24 (3 tries, 6 goals)	Johnathan Thurston	v Brisbane, Suncorp Stadium – Rd 1, 2006. North Queensland won 36-4.
24 (1 try, 10 goals)	Josh Hannay	v South Sydney, Dairy Farmers Stadium – Rd 23, 2003. North Queensland won 60-8.

=== Most goals in a match ===
Goals	Player	Match details
11	Valentine Holmes	v Wests Tigers, Queensland Country Bank Stadium – Rd 18, 2023. North Queensland won 74-0.
10	Josh Hannay	v South Sydney, Dairy Farmers Stadium – Rd 23, 2003. North Queensland won 60-8.
9	Julian O'Neill	v St George Illawarra, Dairy Farmers Stadium – Rd 13, 2000. North Queensland won 50-4.
9	Julian O'Neill	v Northern Eagles, Dairy Farmers Stadium – Rd 8, 2000. North Queensland won 50-10.
8	Johnathan Thurston	v Parramatta, 1300SMILES Stadium – Rd 24, 2018. North Queensland won 44-6.
8	Johnathan Thurston	v Wests Tigers, 1300SMILES Stadium – Rd 22, 2014. North Queensland won 64-6.
8	Johnathan Thurston	v Warriors, Dairy Farmers Stadium – Rd 23, 2012. North Queensland won 52-12.

=== Most tries in a season ===
Tries	Player	Season details
23	Kyle Feldt	25 games, 2024
22	Matthew Bowen	27 games, 2007
21	Matt Sing	20 games, 2003
21	Matthew Bowen	25 games, 2005
21	Ashley Graham	24 games, 2012

=== Most points in a season ===
Points	Player	Season details
266 (16 tries, 101 goals)	Valentine Holmes	24 games, 2024
244 (10 tries, 100 goals, 4 field goals)	Valentine Holmes	27 games, 2022
234 (11 tries, 93 goals, 4 field goals)	Johnathan Thurston	24 games, 2014
230 (10 tries, 95 goals)	Josh Hannay	23 games, 2003
228 (8 tries, 98 goals)	Josh Hannay	27 games, 2004

=== Youngest players to debut ===
Age	Player	Year	Round
17 years and 82 days	Jason Taumalolo	2010	Round 9
17 years and 344 days	Denny Lambert	1998	Round 24
18 years and 36 days	Scott Prince	1998	Round 4
18 years and 61 days	Ashley Alberts	2002	Round 4
18 years and 77 days	Josh Hannay	1998	Round 3
18 years and 134 days	Michael Morgan	2010	Round 24
18 years and 136 days	Jimmy Ahmat	1997	Round 2
18 years and 146 days	Aaron Ketchell	1995	Round 20
18 years and 154 days	Scott Donald	1998	Round 19
18 years and 170 days	Kalyn Ponga	2016	Finals Week 2

=== Oldest players ===
Age	Player	Year	Round
35 years and 185 days	Jason Smith	2007	Finals Week 2
35 years and 176 days	Jake Granville	2024	Round 22
35 years and 129 days	Johnathan Thurston	2018	Round 25
35 years and 36 days	Gavin Cooper	2020	Round 4
34 years and 104 days	Glenn Hall	2015	Round 17
34 years and 103 days	James Tamou	2023	Round 4
34 years and 17 days	Matthew Scott	2019	Round 22
33 years and 172 days	John Lomax	1999	Round 21
33 years and 104 days	Jason Taumalolo	2026	Finals Week 1
33 years and 23 days	Ian Roberts	1998	Round 24
32 years and 360 days	Steve Walters	1998	Round 24

== Team ==
=== Biggest wins ===
Margin	Opponent	Score	Venue	Date
74	Wests Tigers	74–0	Queensland Country Bank Stadium	Round 18 – 1 July 2023
58	Wests Tigers	64–6	1300SMILES Stadium	Round 22 – 9 August 2014
52	South Sydney Rabbitohs	60–8	Dairy Farmers Stadium	Round 24 – 23 August 2003
46	St George Illawarra Dragons	50–4	Dairy Farmers Stadium	Round 13 – 29 April 2000
42	Cronulla Sharks	56–14	Dairy Farmers Stadium	Round 13 – 4 June 2005
42	Parramatta Eels	46–4	1300SMILES Stadium	Round 20 – 27 July 2015

=== Biggest losses ===
Margin	Opponent	Score	Venue	Date
70	Sydney Roosters	12–82	Queensland Country Bank Stadium	Rd 22 – 30 July 2026
62	Parramatta Eels	0–62	Bankwest Stadium	Rd 21 – 29 July 2001
62	North Sydney Bears	0–62	North Sydney Oval	Rd 24 – 23 August 1998
62	Sydney Bulldogs	4–66	Belmore Sports Ground	Rd 22 – 27 August 1995
56	Canberra Raiders	10–66	Bruce Stadium	Rd 4 – 14 April 1996

=== Golden Point results ===
Played	Won	Drawn	Lost
29	15	2	12

Opponent	Result	Score	Date	Venue
Penrith Panthers	Loss	24–28	7 June 2003	Dairy Farmers Stadium
South Sydney Rabbitohs	Draw	20–20	15 May 2004	Bluetongue Stadium
New Zealand Warriors	Win	26–28	20 June 2004	Ericsson Stadium
Newcastle Knights	Win	24–28	25 July 2004	EnergyAustralia Stadium
Canberra Raiders	Loss	14–15	27 May 2006	Dairy Farmers Stadium
Penrith Panthers	Win	30–26	13 August 2007	CUA Stadium
Penrith Panthers	Loss	18–19	31 May 2008	Dairy Farmers Stadium
Cronulla Sharks	Loss	19–20	26 June 2010	Dairy Farmers Stadium
Newcastle Knights	Win	28–24	24 July 2010	Dairy Farmers Stadium
South Sydney Rabbitohs	Loss	26–24	19 August 2011	ANZ Stadium
Cronulla-Sutherland Sharks	Win	20–19	1 September 2014	1300SMILES Stadium
Melbourne Storm	Win	18–17	30 March 2015	1300SMILES Stadium
Brisbane Broncos	Win	16–17	4 October 2015	ANZ Stadium
Brisbane Broncos	Loss	21–20	25 March 2016	Suncorp Stadium
Canberra Raiders	Win	20–16	4 March 2017	1300SMILES Stadium
Brisbane Broncos	Win	20–21	10 March 2017	Suncorp Stadium
Melbourne Storm	Loss	23–22	17 June 2017	AAMI Park
Wests Tigers	Loss	26–27	15 June 2019	1300SMILES Stadium
St. George Illawarra Dragons	Win	23–22	6 September 2020	Queensland Country Bank Stadium
New Zealand Warriors	Loss	25–24	8 April 2022	Moreton Daily Stadium
Cronulla-Sutherland Sharks	Win	30–32	10 September 2022	PointsBet Stadium
Canterbury-Bankstown Bulldogs	Loss	15–14	2 April 2023	Accor Stadium
Penrith Panthers	Win	27–23	16 June 2023	Queensland Country Bank Stadium
Newcastle Knights	Win	21–20	16 March 2024	Queensland Country Bank Stadium
Manly Warringah Sea Eagles	Loss	20–21	6 July 2024	Queensland Country Bank Stadium
Penrith Panthers	Draw	30–30	10 May 2025	Queensland Country Bank Stadium
Parramatta Eels	Loss	30–33	8 May 2026	Queensland Country Bank Stadium
Manly Warringah Sea Eagles	Win	19–18	12 July 2026	4 Pines Park

== All time premiership record ==
=== Regular season ===
Games	Won	Drawn	Lost	Win percentage	Points for	Points against	Points differential
789	342	7	439	43.3%	16,465	18,424	-1,959

== Streaks ==
=== Most consecutive wins ===
- 11 – March 30, 2015 to June 27, 2015
- 7 – August 8, 2007 to September 16, 2007
- 6 – March 12, 2006 to April 16, 2006
- 6 – August 27, 2006 to April 7, 2007
- 6 – June 4, 2023 to July 22, 2023

=== Most consecutive losses ===
- 13 – April 26, 2008 to August 2, 2008
- 10 – July 25, 1998 to April 10, 1999
- 10 – June 11, 2021 to August 21, 2021

== Comebacks ==
=== Biggest comeback ===
- Trailed Penrith Panthers 26-0 at half time to win 36-28 at Penrith Park, Round 12, 1998 (biggest comeback in league history).

== Crowds ==
=== Top home attendances ===
Willows Sports Complex (1995–2019)

Crowd	Details
30,302	Round 8, 1999 v Brisbane Broncos
30,250	Round 22, 1998 v Brisbane Broncos
30,122	Round 6, 1997 v Brisbane Broncos
27,643	Round 6, 2000 v Brisbane Broncos
27,096	Round 16, 1996 v South Sydney Rabbitohs

Queensland Country Bank Stadium (2020–)

Crowd	Details
25,461	Round 21, 2026 v Brisbane Broncos
25,372	Preliminary Final, 2022 v Parramatta Eels
24,861	Elimination Final, 2024 v Newcastle Knights
24,230	Round 23, 2024 v Brisbane Broncos
23,840	Round 25, 2022 v Penrith Panthers

== See also ==
- List of North Queensland Cowboys players
- List of North Queensland Cowboys honours
- List of North Queensland Cowboys representatives
