= List of North Queensland Cowboys representatives =

The following list includes players from the North Queensland Cowboys that have represented state and national sides while at the club and the years that they achieved their honours. Representatives are included if they were contracted to the Cowboys at the time of their representation. This includes the Cowboys under-20 team or contracted players who were playing for the Mackay Cutters, Northern Pride, Townsville Blackhawks or North Queensland Young Guns, as they are/were feeder clubs.

== International ==
=== Australia ===
- (Australia) Steve Walters (1997, Super League)
- (Australia) Matt Sing (2003–05)
- (Australia) Matthew Bowen (2004)
- (Australia) Luke O'Donnell (2005–06)
- (Australia) Johnathan Thurston (2006–09, 2011–17)
- (Australia) Carl Webb (2008)
- (Australia) Matthew Scott (2010–16)
- (Australia) Willie Tonga (2010–11)
- (Australia) James Tamou (2012–16)
- (Australia) Brent Tate (2013)
- (Australia) Michael Morgan (2016–17)
- (Australia) Justin O'Neill (2016)
- (Australia) Jordan McLean (2018)
- (Australia) Reuben Cotter (2022–25)
- (Australia) Valentine Holmes (2022–23)
- (Australia) Jeremiah Nanai (2022)
- (Australia) Murray Taulagi (2022)
- (Australia) Tom Dearden (2024-25)

=== Australia (W) ===
- (Australia) Emma Manzelmann (2023)
- (Australia) Jakiya Whitfeld (2024)

=== Cook Islands (W) ===
- (Cook Islands) Jazmon Tupou-Witchman (2024)

=== England ===
- (England) John Bateman (2025)

=== Fiji ===
- (Fiji) Noa Nadruku (1998–99)
- (Fiji) Ashton Sims (2013)
- (Fiji) Tariq Sims (2013)
- (Fiji) Viliame Kikau (2015)
- (Fiji) Taniela Sadrugu (2022)
- (Fiji) Semi Valemei (2024-25)

=== Fiji (W) ===
- (Fiji) Vitalina Naikore (2023–24)

=== France ===
- (France) Clint Greenshields (2013)

=== Greece ===
- (Greece) George Gatis (2005)

=== Ireland ===
- (Republic of Ireland) Rory Kostjasyn (2013)

=== Italy ===
- (Italy) Paul Pensini (1999)
- (Italy) Paul Dezolt (2003)
- (Italy) Daniel Sorbello (2004)
- (Italy) Joel Riethmuller (2011, 2013)
- (Italy) Nic Lenaz (2025)

=== New Zealand ===
- (New Zealand) John Lomax (1997–98)
- (New Zealand) Tyran Smith (1997)
- (New Zealand) Brian Jellick (1999–00)
- (New Zealand) Paul Rauhihi (2003–05)
- (New Zealand) David Faiumu (2005–07)
- (New Zealand) Kalifa Faifai Loa (2011)
- (New Zealand) Jason Taumalolo (2014, 2016–17)
- (New Zealand) Te Maire Martin (2017–18)
- (New Zealand) Peta Hiku (2022)
- (New Zealand) Griffin Neame (2023–24)

=== Papua New Guinea ===
- (Papua New Guinea) Bruce Mamando (2000)
- (Papua New Guinea) Tyson Martin (2009)
- (Papua New Guinea) Ray Thompson (2013, 2015)
- (Papua New Guinea) Kurt Baptiste (2019)
- (Papua New Guinea) Daniel Russell (2019)
- (Papua New Guinea) Robert Derby (2022–25)
- (Papua New Guinea) Zac Laybutt (2023, 2025)

=== Papua New Guinea (W) ===
- (Papua New Guinea) Essay Banu (2023–24)
- (Papua New Guinea) Sera Koroi (2023)
- (Papua New Guinea) Shellie Long (2023)
- (Papua New Guinea) Sareka Mooka (2023–24)
- (Papua New Guinea) Jessikah Reeves (2023)

=== Samoa ===
- (Samoa) Robert Piva (1995)
- (Samoa) Malo Solomona (2006)
- (Samoa) Alex Elisala (2013)
- (Samoa) Kalifa Faifai Loa (2013)
- (Samoa) Antonio Winterstein (2013–14, 2016)
- (Samoa) Tautau Moga (2014–15)
- (Samoa) John Asiata (2016–17)
- (Samoa) Hamiso Tabuai-Fidow (2022)
- (Samoa) Luciano Leilua (2023)
- (Samoa) Murray Taulagi (2023, 2025)
- (Samoa) Heilum Luki (2023)
- (Samoa) Jeremiah Nanai (2024-25)

=== Samoa (W) ===
- (Samoa) Jetaya Faifua (2024)

=== Scotland ===
- (Scotland) Geoff Bell (2000)
- (Scotland) Kane Linnett (2013, 2016)
- (Scotland) Lachlan Coote (2016)

=== Tonga ===
- (Tonga) Jason Taumalolo (2013, 2017–19, 2022, 2024-25)
- (Tonga) Patrick Kaufusi (2016–17)
- (Tonga) John Asiata (2019)

=== Tonga (W) ===
- (Tonga) China Polata (2023)
- (Tonga) Ana Malupo (2024)

=== Wales ===
- (Wales) Jonathan Davies (1995)
- (Wales) Kevin Ellis (1995)

== International 9s ==
=== Australia ===
- (Australia) Kyle Feldt (2019)

=== Lebanon ===
- (Lebanon) Jacob Kiraz (2019)

=== Papua New Guinea ===
- (Papua New Guinea) Daniel Russell (2019)

=== Tonga ===
- (Tonga) John Asiata (2019)
- (Tonga) Jason Taumalolo (2019)

== State of Origin ==
=== Queensland ===
- (Queensland) Owen Cunningham (1997, Super League)
- (Queensland) Steve Walters (1997, Super League)
- (Queensland) Paul Green (1999–00)
- (Queensland) Paul Bowman (2000–01, 2003–05)
- (Queensland) Julian O'Neill (2000)
- (Queensland) John Buttigieg (2001–02)
- (Queensland) John Doyle (2001–02)
- (Queensland) Nathan Fien (2001)
- (Queensland) Matthew Bowen (2003–07)
- (Queensland) Matt Sing (2003–05)
- (Queensland) Josh Hannay (2003, 2006)
- (Queensland) Travis Norton (2004)
- (Queensland) Johnathan Thurston (2005–17)
- (Queensland) Carl Webb (2005–08)
- (Queensland) Ty Williams (2005)
- (Queensland) Jacob Lillyman (2006–08)
- (Queensland) Matthew Scott (2006, 2009–16)
- (Queensland) Willie Tonga (2009–11)
- (Queensland) Brent Tate (2012–13)
- (Queensland) Michael Morgan (2015–19)
- (Queensland) Justin O'Neill (2016–17)
- (Queensland) Gavin Cooper (2016–18)
- (Queensland) Coen Hess (2017–18, 2020)
- (Queensland) Josh McGuire (2019)
- (Queensland) Valentine Holmes (2020–24)
- (Queensland) Kyle Feldt (2021)
- (Queensland) Francis Molo (2021)
- (Queensland) Hamiso Tabuai-Fidow (2021)
- (Queensland) Reuben Cotter (2022–24)
- (Queensland) Jeremiah Nanai (2022–24)
- (Queensland) Murray Taulagi (2022–24)
- (Queensland) Tom Dearden (2022, 2024)
- (Queensland) Tom Gilbert (2022)

=== Queensland (W) ===
- (Queensland) Emma Manzelmann (2023–24)
- (Queensland) China Polata (2023)
- (Queensland) Shaniah Power (2023)
- (Queensland) Makenzie Weale (2024)

=== New South Wales ===
- (New South Wales) Ian Roberts (1997, Super League)
- (New South Wales) Tim Brasher (2000)
- (New South Wales) Luke O'Donnell (2006, 2009–10)
- (New South Wales) James Tamou (2012–16)
- (New South Wales) Reece Robson (2023–24)

== All Stars Game ==
=== Indigenous All Stars ===
- Johnathan Thurston (2010–13, 2015, 2017)
- Carl Webb (2010)
- Ty Williams (2010)
- Matthew Bowen (2011–2012)
- Cory Paterson (2012)
- Ray Thompson (2015)
- Reuben Cotter (2021)
- Hamiso Tabuai-Fidow (2022)
- Jamayne Taunoa-Brown (2022–23)

=== Indigenous All Stars (W) ===
- Essay Banu (2023)
- Bree Chester (2023)
- Kirra Dibb (2023–24)
- Tallisha Harden (2024)
- Mia Middleton (2023)
- Sareka Mooka (2023)
- Shaniah Power (2023)
- Tahlulah Tillett (2023)
- Jasmine Peters (2024)

=== Maori All Stars ===
- (Māori people) Daejarn Asi (2021)
- (Māori people) Wiremu Greig (2021)
- (Māori people) Esan Marsters (2020–2021)
- (Māori people) Emry Pere (2021)

=== Maori All Stars (W) ===
- (Māori people) Tiana Raftstrand-Smith (2024)

=== NRL/World All Stars ===
- (Australia) Luke O'Donnell (2010)
- (Australia) Matthew Scott (2011)
- (Australia) Aaron Payne (2012)
- (Australia) James Tamou (2013)
- (Australia) Jason Taumalolo (2015)
- (Australia) Antonio Winterstein (2015)
- (Australia) Matthew Wright (2016)
- (Australia) Gavin Cooper (2017)

== City vs Country Origin ==
=== NSW Country ===
- (New South Wales) Glenn Morrison (2001, 2003–04)
- (New South Wales) Mitchell Sargent (2006)
- (New South Wales) Ray Cashmere (2008)
- (New South Wales) Ben Harris (2008)
- (New South Wales) Willie Mason (2010)
- (New South Wales) Tariq Sims (2012–14)
- (New South Wales) Rory Kostjasyn (2016)
- (New South Wales) Kane Linnett (2016)

=== NSW City ===
- (New South Wales) Luke O'Donnell (2005, 2009–10)

== Other honours ==
=== Prime Minister's XIII ===
- (Australia) Matthew Bowen (2005, 2011)
- (Australia) Johnathan Thurston (2006, 2009)
- (Australia) Luke O'Donnell (2006, 2008–09)
- (Australia) Shane Tronc (2006)
- (Australia) Carl Webb (2008)
- (Australia) Matthew Scott (2009)
- (Australia) Gavin Cooper (2013)
- (Australia) Michael Morgan (2014)
- (Australia) Jake Clifford (2018)
- (Australia) Jordan McLean (2018)
- (Australia) Enari Tuala (2018)
- (Australia) Kyle Feldt (2019)
- (Australia) Reuben Cotter (2023)
- (Australia) Tom Dearden (2023)
- (Australia) Reece Robson (2023)
- (Australia) Murray Taulagi (2023)
- (Australia) Sam McIntyre (2024)
- (Australia) Harrison Edwards (2025)

=== Prime Minister's XIII (W) ===
- (Australia) Tallisha Harden (2023)
- (Australia) Emma Manzelmann (2023–24)
- (Australia) China Polata (2023)
- (Australia) Tiana Raftstrand-Smith (2023)
- (Australia) Krystal Blackwell (2024)
- (Australia) Bree Chester (2024)
- (Australia) Kirra Dibb (2024)
- (Australia) Lily Peacock (2024)

=== PNG Prime Minister's XIII ===
- (Papua New Guinea) Tyson Martin (2009)
- (Papua New Guinea) James Segeyaro (2011)
- (Papua New Guinea) Ray Thompson (2011)
- (Papua New Guinea) Kyle Laybutt (2018)
- (Papua New Guinea) Robert Derby (2023, 2025)
- (Papua New Guinea) Zac Laybutt (2023)

=== PNG Prime Minister's XIII (W) ===
- (Papua New Guinea) Essay Banu (2023–24)
- (Papua New Guinea) Sera Koroi (2023)
- (Papua New Guinea) Shellie Long (2023)
- (Papua New Guinea) Sareka Mooka (2024)
- (Papua New Guinea) Jessikah Reeves (2023)

=== Indigenous Dreamtime Team ===
- Carl Webb (2008)
- Ty Williams (2008)

=== Aborigines ===
- John Buttigieg (1999)
- John Doyle (1999)

=== New Zealand Māori ===
- (Māori people) James Tamou (2010)
- (Māori people) Arana Taumata (2010)

=== Queensland Residents ===
- (Queensland) Jason Barsley (2005–06)
- (Queensland) Scott Bolton (2006, 2008)
- (Queensland) Mark Dalle Cort (2006)
- (Queensland) Shane Muspratt (2006–07)
- (Queensland) Dayne Weston (2009)
- (Queensland) Clint Amos (2010)
- (Queensland) Donald Malone (2010)
- (Queensland) Joel Riethmuller (2011)
- (Queensland) Sam Hoare (2013)
- (Queensland) Curtis Rona (2013)
- (Queensland) Javid Bowen (2014–15)
- (Queensland) Kyle Feldt (2015)
- (Queensland) Patrick Kaufusi (2015)
- (Queensland) Hezron Murgha (2015)
- (Queensland) Ben Spina (2015)
- (Queensland) Jahrome Hughes (2016)
- (Queensland) Corey Jensen (2017)
- (Queensland) Kyle Laybutt (2017)
- (Queensland) Tom Gilbert (2019)

== Junior Representatives ==
=== Junior Kangaroos ===
- (Australia) Kyle Feldt (2011)
- (Australia) Mosese Pangai (2011)
- (Australia) Chris Grevsmuhl (2012)
- (Australia) Coen Hess (2015–16)
- (Australia) Enari Tuala (2017–18)
- (Australia) Jake Clifford (2018)
- (Australia) Murray Taulagi (2018)

=== Junior Kiwis ===
- (New Zealand) Jason Taumalolo (2010–12)
- (New Zealand) Michael Parker-Walshe (2011)
- (New Zealand) Wayne Ulugia (2011)
- (New Zealand) Braden Uele (2015)
- (New Zealand) Brandon Smith (2016)
- (New Zealand) Peter Hola (2018)
- (New Zealand) Sean Mullany (2018)
- (New Zealand) Emry Pere (2018)
- (New Zealand) Griffin Neame (2019)

=== Queensland U20 Origin ===
- (Queensland) Alex Elisala (2012)
- (Queensland) Chris Grevsmuhl (2012–13)
- (Queensland) Patrick Kaufusi (2013)
- (Queensland) Zac Santo (2013)
- (Queensland) Coen Hess (2015)
- (Queensland) Conor Carey (2015)
- (Queensland) Gideon Gela-Mosby (2015–16)
- (Queensland) Cooper Bambling (2016)
- (Queensland) Marcus Jensen (2016)
- (Queensland) Bacho Salam (2016)
- (Queensland) Darryn Schonig (2016)
- (Queensland) Mitchell Dunn (2017)
- (Queensland) Corey Horsburgh (2017)
- (Queensland) Hiale Slade-Roycroft (2017)
- (Queensland) Jake Clifford (2018)
- (Queensland) Murray Taulagi (2018-19)
- (Queensland) Kurt Wiltshire (2018)
- (Queensland) Elijah Anderson (2019)
- (Queensland) Nathan Barrett (2019)
- (Queensland) Logan Bayliss-Brow (2019)
- (Queensland) Ben Condon (2019)
- (Queensland) Tom Gilbert (2019)

=== Queensland U19 Origin ===
- (Queensland) Tom Duffy (2022)
- (Queensland) Kulikefu Finefeuiaki (2022)
- (Queensland) Luke Jack (2022)
- (Queensland) Jacob Mene (2022)
- (Queensland) Mutua Brown (2023–24)
- (Queensland) Zack Lamont (2023)
- (Queensland) Jamal Shibasaki (2023–24)
- (Queensland) Wil Sullivan (2023)
- (Queensland) Mason Kira (2024)
- (Queensland) Jaxon Purdue (2024)

=== New South Wales U19 Origin ===
- (New South Wales) Kaiden Lahrs (2024)

== Representative Coaching Staff ==
=== International ===
Greece

- (Australia) Steve Georgallis (Head Coach – 2022)

Papua New Guinea Women

- (Australia) Ben Jeffries (Head Coach – 2022)

Tonga

- (Australia) Murray Hurst (Head Coach – 1998–00)
- (Australia) Dean Young (Assistant Coach – 2022)

United States

- (Australia) Terry Matterson (Head Coach – 2013)

=== State Of Origin ===
Queensland

- (Queensland) Neil Henry (Assistant Coach – 2006, 2009)

New South Wales

- (New South Wales) Graham Murray (Head Coach – 2006–07)

=== All Stars Game ===
Indigenous All Stars

- (Australia) Neil Henry (Head Coach – 2010)

=== City-Country Origin ===
NSW Country

- (New South Wales) Graham Murray (Head Coach – 2002)

NSW City

- (New South Wales) Graham Murray (Coach – 2003–05)
