= Viliami Vailea =

Tongan rugby league footballer (born 2002)

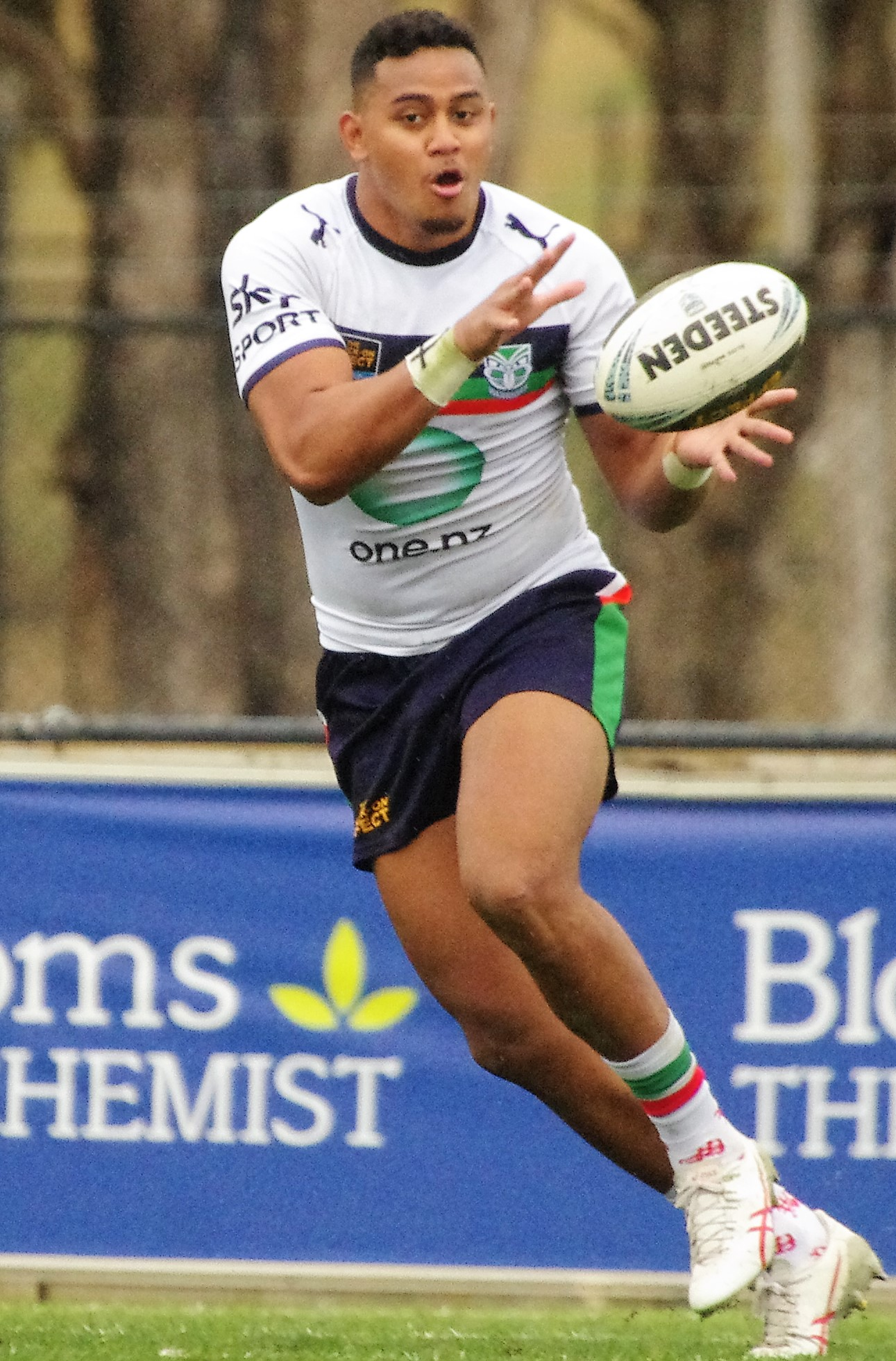

Personal information
- Full name: Viliami Vailea
- Born: 17 November 2002 (age 23) Vaini, Tonga
- Height: 185 cm (6 ft 1 in)
- Weight: 98 kg (15 st 6 lb)

Playing information

Rugby league
- Position: Centre
Club
Years	Team	Pld	T	G	FG	P
2021–23	New Zealand Warriors	17	8	0	0	32
2024–26	Nth Qld Cowboys	32	4	0	0	16
	Total	49	12	0	0	48

Rugby union
- Position: Centre, Wing
Club
Years	Team	Pld	T	G	FG	P
2026–	Kintetsu Liners
- Source: As of 28 September 2026

Viliami Vailea (born 17 November 2002) is a Tongan professional rugby league footballer who previously played as a centre for the North Queensland Cowboys in the National Rugby League (NRL). He is currently signed with Hanazono Kintetsu Liners.

== Background ==
Before turning to rugby league, Vailea was a prominent rugby union player at Aorere College.

== Playing career ==
=== 2021 ===
In round 20 of the 2021 NRL season, Vailea made his debut for the Warriors against the Wests Tigers at Suncorp Stadium in a 18–16 win.

=== 2022 ===
He made a total of ten appearances for the New Zealand Warriors in the 2022 NRL season as they finished 15th on the table.

=== 2023 ===
Vailea signed a two-year contract with the North Queensland Cowboys.

=== 2024 ===
In round 9 of the 2024 NRL season, Vailea made his debut for the North Queensland Cowboys against the Dolphins (NRL) at Queensland Country Bank Stadium in a 26-28 loss.

He scored his first North Queensland Cowboys try in round 11 of the 2024 NRL season in round 11 in a 22-28 win against the South Sydney Rabbitohs during Magic Round at Suncorp Stadium.

=== 2025 ===
On 4 June, the Cowboys announced that Vailea and Zac Laybutt had re-signed with the club until the end of 2027.

== Statistics ==
Year	Team	Games	Tries	Pts
2021	New Zealand Warriors	2		
2022	New Zealand Warriors	10	7	28
2023	New Zealand Warriors	5	1	4
2024	North Queensland Cowboys	18	2	8
2025	North Queensland Cowboys	14	2	8
2026	North Queensland Cowboys			
	Totals	49	12	48
