= 2024 NRL season =

Australian rugby league season

2024 National Rugby League
- Duration: 2 March (Note: Local time in Las Vegas.) – 6 October 2024
- Teams: 17
- Premiers: Penrith Panthers (6th title)
- Minor premiers: Melbourne Storm (6th title)
- Matches played: 213
- Points scored: 9,964
- Average attendance: 20,611
- Attendance: 4,266,464
- Top points scorer: Valentine Holmes (266)
- Wooden spoon: Wests Tigers (3rd spoon)
- Dally M Medal: Jahrome Hughes
- Top try-scorer: Alofiana Khan-Pereira (24)

The 2024 NRL season was the 117th season of professional rugby league in Australia and the 27th season run by the National Rugby League (NRL). The season consisted of 27 competition rounds, followed by a finals series contested by the top eight teams on the competition ladder. The Melbourne Storm were the minor premiers, and the Penrith Panthers took their fourth premiership in a row, and sixth overall.

The season recorded the highest aggregate and average regular season crowds in first-grade rugby league history.

== Teams ==
The lineup of teams in the league remained unchanged after the admission of the Dolphins into the competition in the previous season, with seventeen participating in the regular season: ten from New South Wales, four from Queensland and one from each of Victoria, the Australian Capital Territory and New Zealand.

Club	Season	Home ground(s)	Head coach	Captain(s)
Brisbane Broncos	37th season	Suncorp Stadium	Kevin Walters	Adam Reynolds
Canberra Raiders	43rd season	GIO Stadium	Ricky Stuart	Elliott Whitehead
Canterbury-Bankstown Bulldogs	90th season	Accor Stadium and Belmore Sports Ground	Cameron Ciraldo	Stephen Crichton
Cronulla-Sutherland Sharks	58th season	PointsBet Stadium	Craig Fitzgibbon	~~Dale Finucane~~ and Cameron McInnes
Dolphins	2nd season	Kayo Stadium and Suncorp Stadium	Wayne Bennett	Jesse Bromwich
Gold Coast Titans	18th season	Cbus Super Stadium	Des Hasler	Tino Fa'asuamaleaui → Kieran Foran (Note: Fa'asuamaleaui suffered a season-ending injury in Round 3, Foran thus filled in as captain for the rest of the season)
Manly Warringah Sea Eagles	75th season	4 Pines Park	Anthony Seibold	Daly Cherry-Evans
Melbourne Storm	27th season	AAMI Park	Craig Bellamy	Harry Grant
Newcastle Knights	37th season	McDonald Jones Stadium	Adam O'Brien	Jayden Brailey and Kalyn Ponga
New Zealand Warriors	30th season	Go Media Stadium	Andrew Webster	Tohu Harris
North Queensland Cowboys	30th season	Queensland Country Bank Stadium	Todd Payten	Reuben Cotter and Tom Dearden
Parramatta Eels	78th season	CommBank Stadium	~~Brad Arthur~~ → Trent Barrett (interim)	Clinton Gutherson and Junior Paulo
Penrith Panthers	58th season	BlueBet Stadium	Ivan Cleary	Nathan Cleary and Isaah Yeo
South Sydney Rabbitohs	115th season	Accor Stadium	~~Jason Demetriou~~ → Ben Hornby (interim)	Cameron Murray
St. George Illawarra Dragons	26th season	Netstrata Jubilee Stadium and WIN Stadium	Shane Flanagan	Ben Hunt
Sydney Roosters	117th season	Allianz Stadium	Trent Robinson	James Tedesco
Wests Tigers	25th season	Leichhardt Oval and Campbelltown Sports Stadium	Benji Marshall	Apisai Koroisau

== Pre-season ==
=== Trials ===
Italics indicates a non-NRL club

Date	Time	Home	Score	Away	Stadium	Attendance	Report
10 February 2024	16:00 AEST (UTC+10:00)	Wynnum Manly Seagulls	16–26	Brisbane Broncos	Kougari Oval, Brisbane	5,000	Report
10 February 2024	18:10 AEST (UTC+10:00)	Central Queensland Capras	6–58	Dolphins	Browne Park, Rockhampton		Report
11 February 2024	16:00 AEST (UTC+10:00)	Manly Warringah Sea Eagles	68–6	South Sydney Rabbitohs	Central Coast Stadium, Gosford		Report

=== All Stars match ===
16 February 2024
19:10 AEST (UTC+10:00)

Indigenous All Stars	22–14	(Māori people) Māori All Stars
	Report

Queensland Country Bank Stadium, Townsville
Attendance: 15,369
Referee: Todd Smith

=== Pre-season Challenge ===
The 16-game Pre-season Challenge was played from 15 February to 25 February 2024, the winners being the Brisbane Broncos.

== Regular season ==
For the first time, the NRL season began with a split-round, commencing with a double-header at Allegiant Stadium in Las Vegas, United States, with the Manly Warringah Sea Eagles taking on the South Sydney Rabbitohs followed by the Sydney Roosters facing the Brisbane Broncos on 2 March 2024. Subsequently, the Sea Eagles became the first side in NRL history to play in three separate countries in one season when they played the New Zealand Warriors in Auckland in Round 6, having already played in the United States and Australia.

=== Results ===
Team	1	2	3	4	5	6	7	8	9	10	11	12	13	14	15	16	17	18	19	20	21	22	23	24	25	26	27	F1	F2	F3	GF
Brisbane Broncos	SYD −10	**SOU** **+10**	PEN −22	**NQL** **+26**	MEL −2	**DOL** **+14**	**CAN** **+24**	WTI +24	**SYD** **−22**	PAR +16	MAN +1	**GCT** **−2**	X	**CRO** **−10**	SOU −10	X	NZL −16	**PEN** **−8**	**SGI** **−4**	NEW +16	**CBY** **−25**	GCT −28	NQL +24	X	**PAR** **+6**	DOL −34	**MEL** **−38**				
Canberra Raiders	NEW +16	**WTI** **+20**	NZL −8	CRO −14	**PAR** **+33**	**GCT** **+1***	BRI −24	**CRO** **−40**	MAN +2	X	**CBY** **+4**	**SYD** **−28**	DOL +1*	X	**NQL** **−18**	WTI −24	MEL −10	**NEW** **−4**	X	**NZL** **+2**	**SOU** **+20**	CBY −4	**MAN** **−22**	NQL −38	**PEN** **+4**	SYD +2	SGI +2				
Canterbury-Bankstown Bulldogs	PAR −18	CRO −19	**GCT** **+32**	SOU −4	**SYD** **+4**	MEL −2	**NEW** **+24**	X	**WTI** **+8**	PEN −6	CAN −4	**SGI** **+32**	NEW +30	**PAR** **+4**	X	SYD −18	**CRO** **+1***	**NZL** **+1***	X	NQL −2	BRI +25	**CAN** **+4**	SGI +18	**DOL** **+20**	NZL +16	**MAN** **−12**	**NQL** **−38**	**MAN** **−2**			
Cronulla-Sutherland Sharks	NZL +4	**CBY** **+19**	WTI −26	**CAN** **+14**	X	SOU +12	**NQL** **+36**	CAN +40	**SGI** **+10**	MEL +7	**SYD** **+8**	**PEN** **−42**	PAR −12	BRI +10	**DOL** **−2**	X	CBY −1*	**GCT** **−4**	**WTI** **+52**	X	NQL −8	**SOU** **+14**	GCT +44	**NEW** **+1***	SGI +28	**NZL** **−2**	MAN +20	MEL −27	**NQL** **+8**	PEN −20	
Dolphins	**NQL** **−25**	**SGI** **+38**	X	GCT +16	**WTI** **+10**	BRI −14	PAR +28	**NEW** **−4**	NQL +2	**MAN** **+6**	WTI +12	NZL −4	**CAN** **−1***	X	CRO +2	**MEL** **−6**	SGI −20	X	**SOU** **+8**	PEN −2	**GCT** **−7**	**SYD** **−6**	**NZL** **+2***	CBY −20	MEL −42	**BRI** **+34**	NEW −8				
Gold Coast Titans	**SGI** **−24**	X	CBY −32	**DOL** **−16**	NQL −13	CAN −1*	**MAN** **−4**	NZL +3	**MEL** **−2**	**NQL** **+2**	**NEW** **−4**	BRI +2	X	**SOU** **−34**	WTI −8	**NZL** **+60**	X	CRO +4	**PAR** **+8**	MAN −30	DOL +7	**BRI** **+28**	**CRO** **−44**	SGI −16	**SYD** **−26**	NEW −22	PEN −6				
Manly Warringah Sea Eagles	**SOU** **+12**	**SYD** **+7**	PAR −4	SGI −8	**PEN** **+14**	NZL; 0*	GCT +4	**PAR** **+14**	**CAN** **−2**	DOL −6	**BRI** **−1**	**MEL** **+6**	X	PEN −10	**SGI** **+16**	SOU −14	X	NQL +1*	**NEW** **+38**	**GCT** **+30**	SYD −4	X	CAN +22	**NZL** **+14**	WTI −8	CBY +12	**CRO** **−20**	CBY +2	SYD −24		
Melbourne Storm	**PEN** **+8**	**NZL** **+4**	NEW −2	X	**BRI** **+2**	**CBY** **+2**	SYD +6	**SOU** **+34**	GCT +2	**CRO** **−7**	**PAR** **+32**	MAN −6	X	**NEW** **+8**	NZL +14	DOL +6	**CAN** **+10**	WTI +12	X	**SYD** **+16**	PAR +18	**SGI** **−2**	SOU +12	PEN +2	**DOL** **+42**	NQL −8	BRI +38	**CRO** **+27**	X	**SYD** **+30**	**PEN** **−8**
Newcastle Knights	**CAN** **−16**	NQL −1*	**MEL** **+2**	NZL −8	**SGI** **+20**	**SYD** **−2**	CBY −24	DOL +4	**NZL** **+6**	WTI +6	GCT +4	X	**CBY** **−30**	MEL −8	**PEN** **−8**	X	**PAR** **+8**	CAN +4	MAN −38	**BRI** **−16**	X	PEN −8	**WTI** **+16**	CRO −1*	SOU +20	**GCT** **+22**	**DOL** **+8**	NQL −12			
New Zealand Warriors	**CRO** **−4**	MEL −4	**CAN** **+8**	**NEW** **+8**	SOU +30	**MAN**; **0***	SGI −12	**GCT** **−3**	NEW −6	SYD −20	**PEN** **+2**	**DOL** **+4**	X	NQL +30	**MEL** **−14**	GCT −60	**BRI** **+16**	CBY −1*	X	CAN −2	**WTI** **+12**	**PAR** **−10**	DOL −2*	MAN −14	**CBY** **−16**	CRO +2	X				
North Queensland Cowboys	DOL +25	**NEW** **+1***	SGI +22	BRI −26	**GCT** **+13**	PAR −7	CRO −36	**PEN** **−6**	**DOL** **−2**	GCT −2	SOU +6	**WTI** **+14**	SYD +2	**NZL** **−30**	CAN +18	X	PEN +10	**MAN** **−1***	X	**CBY** **+2**	**CRO** **+8**	WTI +18	**BRI** **−24**	**CAN** **+38**	X	**MEL** **+8**	CBY +38	**NEW** **+12**	CRO −8		
Parramatta Eels	**CBY** **+18**	PEN −8	**MAN** **+4**	**WTI** **−1**	CAN −33	**NQL** **+7**	**DOL** **−28**	MAN −14	X	**BRI** **−16**	MEL −32	SOU −16	**CRO** **+12**	CBY −4	**SYD** **−10**	X	NEW −8	**SOU** **−16**	GCT −8	X	**MEL** **−18**	NZL +10	**PEN** **−2**	SYD −24	BRI −6	**SGI** **+4**	WTI +34				
Penrith Panthers	MEL −8	**PAR** **+8**	**BRI** **+22**	SYD +6	MAN −14	X	**WTI** **+16**	NQL +6	SOU +30	**CBY** **+6**	NZL −2	CRO +42	**SGI** **−12**	**MAN** **+10**	NEW +8	X	**NQL** **−10**	BRI +8	X	**DOL** **+2**	SGI +36	**NEW** **+8**	PAR +2	**MEL** **−2**	CAN −4	**SOU** **+22**	**GCT** **+6**	**SYD** **+20**	X	**CRO** **+20**	MEL +8
South Sydney Rabbitohs	MAN −12	BRI −10	SYD −42	**CBY** **+4**	**NZL** **−30**	**CRO** **−12**	X	MEL −34	**PEN** **−30**	SGI −14	**NQL** **−6**	**PAR** **+16**	X	GCT +34	**BRI** **+10**	**MAN** **+14**	X	PAR +16	DOL −8	**WTI** **+14**	CAN −20	CRO −14	**MEL** **−12**	WTI −2	**NEW** **−20**	PEN −22	**SYD** **−8**				
St. George Illawarra Dragons	GCT +24	DOL −38	**NQL** **−22**	**MAN** **+8**	NEW −20	WTI +12	**NZL** **+18**	**SYD** **−42**	CRO −10	**SOU** **+14**	X	CBY −32	PEN +12	**WTI** **+42**	MAN −16	X	**DOL** **+20**	SYD −30	BRI +4	X	**PEN** **−36**	MEL +2	**CBY** **−18**	**GCT** **+16**	**CRO** **−28**	PAR −4	**CAN** **−2**				
Sydney Roosters	**BRI** **+10**	MAN −7	**SOU** **+42**	**PEN** **−6**	CBY −4	NEW +2	**MEL** **−6**	SGI +42	BRI +22	**NZL** **+20**	CRO −8	CAN +28	**NQL** **−2**	X	PAR +10	**CBY** **+18**	**WTI** **+34**	**SGI** **+30**	X	MEL −16	**MAN** **+4**	DOL +6	X	**PAR** **+24**	GCT +26	**CAN** **−2**	SOU +8	PEN −20	**MAN** **+24**	MEL −30	
Wests Tigers	X	CAN −20	**CRO** **+26**	PAR +1	DOL −10	**SGI** **−12**	PEN −16	**BRI** **−24**	CBY −8	**NEW** **−6**	**DOL** **−12**	NQL −14	X	SGI −42	**GCT** **+8**	**CAN** **+24**	SYD −34	**MEL** **−12**	CRO −52	SOU −14	NZL −12	**NQL** **−18**	NEW −16	**SOU** **+2**	**MAN** **+8**	X	**PAR** **−34**				
Team	1	2	3	4	5	6	7	8	9	10	11	12	13	14	15	16	17	18	19	20	21	22	23	24	25	26	27	F1	F2	F3	GF

Bold – Home game
X – Bye
* – Golden point game
Opponent for round listed above margin

== Ladder ==
Pos	Team	Pld	W	D	L	B	PF	PA	PD	Pts	Qualification
1	Melbourne Storm	24	19	0	5	3	692	449	+243	44	Advance to finals series
2	Penrith Panthers (P)	24	17	0	7	3	580	394	+186	40	Advance to finals series
3	Sydney Roosters	24	16	0	8	3	738	463	+275	38	Advance to finals series
4	Cronulla-Sutherland Sharks	24	16	0	8	3	653	431	+222	38	Advance to finals series
5	North Queensland Cowboys	24	15	0	9	3	657	568	+89	36	Advance to finals series
6	Canterbury-Bankstown Bulldogs	24	14	0	10	3	529	433	+96	34	Advance to finals series
7	Manly Warringah Sea Eagles	24	13	1	10	3	634	521	+113	33	Advance to finals series
8	Newcastle Knights	24	12	0	12	3	470	510	−40	30	Advance to finals series
9	Canberra Raiders	24	12	0	12	3	474	601	−127	30	
10	Dolphins	24	11	0	13	3	577	578	−1	28	
11	St. George Illawarra Dragons	24	11	0	13	3	508	634	−126	28	
12	Brisbane Broncos	24	10	0	14	3	537	607	−70	26	
13	New Zealand Warriors	24	9	1	14	3	512	574	−62	25	
14	Gold Coast Titans	24	8	0	16	3	488	656	−168	22	
15	Parramatta Eels	24	7	0	17	3	561	716	−155	20	
16	South Sydney Rabbitohs	24	7	0	17	3	494	682	−188	20	
17	Wests Tigers	24	6	0	18	3	463	750	−287	18	

Source: National Rugby League
(P) Premiers

=== Ladder progression ===
- Numbers highlighted in green indicate that the team finished the round inside the top eight.
- Numbers highlighted in blue indicate that the team finished first on the ladder in that round.
- Numbers highlighted in red indicate that the team finished last place on the ladder in that round.
- Underlined numbers indicate that the team had a bye during that round.

	Team	1	2	3	4	5	6	7	8	9	10	11	12	13	14	15	16	17	18	19	20	21	22	23	24	25	26	27
1	Melbourne Storm	2	4	4	6	8	10	12	14	16	16	18	18	20	22	24	26	28	30	32	34	36	36	38	40	42	42	44
2	Penrith Panthers	0	2	4	6	6	8	10	12	14	16	16	18	18	20	22	24	24	26	28	30	32	34	36	36	36	38	40
3	Sydney Roosters	2	2	4	4	4	6	6	8	10	12	12	14	14	16	18	20	22	24	26	26	28	30	32	34	36	36	38
4	Cronulla-Sutherland Sharks	2	4	4	6	8	10	12	14	16	18	20	20	20	22	22	24	24	24	26	28	28	30	32	34	36	36	38
5	North Queensland Cowboys	2	4	6	6	8	8	8	8	8	8	10	12	14	14	16	18	20	20	22	24	26	28	28	30	32	34	36
6	Canterbury-Bankstown Bulldogs	0	0	2	2	4	4	6	8	10	10	10	12	14	16	18	18	20	22	24	24	26	28	30	32	34	34	34
7	Manly Warringah Sea Eagles	2	4	4	4	6	7	9	11	11	11	11	13	15	15	17	17	19	21	23	25	25	27	29	31	31	33	33
8	Newcastle Knights	0	0	2	2	4	4	4	6	8	10	12	14	14	14	14	16	18	20	20	20	22	22	24	24	26	28	30
9	Canberra Raiders	2	4	4	4	6	8	8	8	10	12	14	14	16	18	18	18	18	18	20	22	24	24	24	24	26	28	30
10	Dolphins	0	2	4	6	8	8	10	10	12	14	16	16	16	18	20	20	20	22	24	24	24	24	26	26	26	28	28
11	St. George Illawarra Dragons	2	2	2	4	4	6	8	8	8	10	12	12	14	16	16	18	20	20	22	24	24	26	26	28	28	28	28
12	Brisbane Broncos	0	2	2	4	4	6	8	10	10	12	14	14	16	16	16	18	18	18	18	20	20	20	22	24	26	26	26
13	New Zealand Warriors	0	0	2	4	6	7	7	7	7	7	9	11	13	15	15	15	17	17	19	19	21	21	21	21	21	23	25
14	Gold Coast Titans	0	2	2	2	2	2	2	4	4	6	6	8	10	10	10	12	14	16	18	18	20	22	22	22	22	22	22
15	Parramatta Eels	2	2	4	4	4	6	6	6	8	8	8	8	10	10	10	12	12	12	12	14	14	16	16	16	16	18	20
16	South Sydney Rabbitohs	0	0	0	2	2	2	4	4	4	4	4	6	8	10	12	14	16	18	18	20	20	20	20	20	20	20	20
17	Wests Tigers	2	2	4	6	6	6	6	6	6	6	6	6	8	8	10	12	12	12	12	12	12	12	12	14	16	18	18

== Finals series ==
Home	Score	Away	Match Information
Home	Score	Away	Date and time (Local)	Venue	Referee	Attendance
Qualifying and elimination finals
Penrith Panthers	30–10	Sydney Roosters	13 September, 19:50	BlueBet Stadium	Ashley Klein	21,483
Melbourne Storm	37–10	Cronulla-Sutherland Sharks	14 September, 16:05	AAMI Park	Gerard Sutton	26,326
North Queensland Cowboys	28–16	Newcastle Knights	14 September, 19:50	Queensland Country Bank Stadium	Todd Smith	24,861
Canterbury-Bankstown Bulldogs	22–24	Manly Warringah Sea Eagles	15 September, 16:05	Accor Stadium	Grant Atkins	50,714
Semi-finals
Cronulla-Sutherland Sharks	26–18	North Queensland Cowboys	20 September, 19:50	Allianz Stadium	Ashley Klein	19,124
Sydney Roosters	40–16	Manly Warringah Sea Eagles	21 September, 19:50	Allianz Stadium	Grant Atkins	40,818
Preliminary finals
Melbourne Storm	48–18	Sydney Roosters	27 September, 19:50	AAMI Park	Grant Atkins	29,213
Penrith Panthers	26–6	Cronulla-Sutherland Sharks	28 September, 19:50	Accor Stadium	Ashley Klein	33,753

=== Bracket ===
Qualifying and elimination finals
14 September – Melbourne
1	Melbourne	37
4	Cronulla-Sutherland	10
14 September – Townsville
5	North Queensland	28
8	Newcastle	16
15 September – Sydney
6	Canterbury-Bankstown	22
7	Manly Warringah	24
13 September – Sydney
2	Penrith	30
3	Sydney	10

Semi-finals
20 September – Sydney
Cronulla-Sutherland	26
North Queensland	18
21 September – Sydney
Sydney	40
Manly Warringah	16

Preliminary finals
27 September – Melbourne
Melbourne	48
Sydney	18
28 September – Sydney
Penrith	26
Cronulla-Sutherland	6

Grand final
6 October – Sydney
Melbourne	6
Penrith	14

== Grand final ==
2024 NRL Grand Final

Sunday, 6 October
19:30 AEDT (UTC+11)

Melbourne Storm	6 – 14	Penrith Panthers
Tries: 1 Grant 22'; Goals: 1 Meaney 23' (1/1)	1st: 6–10; 2nd: 0–4; Report	Tries: 3 Turuva 26'; Martin 38'; Alamoti 60'; Goals: 1 Cleary 39' (1/3)

Accor Stadium, Sydney
Attendance: 80,156
Referee: Ashley Klein
Video referee: Grant Atkins
Touch judges: David Munro, Chris Sutton
Clive Churchill Medal: Liam Martin (Penrith)

== Player statistics and records ==
- In Round 5, Daly Cherry-Evans surpassed Cliff Lyons as the most capped Manly Warringah Sea Eagles player of all time.
- In Week 3 of the Finals, Isaah Yeo surpassed Steve Carter as the most capped Penrith Panthers player of all time.

The following statistics are as of the conclusion of Round 27.

Top 5 point scorers

Points	Player	Club	Tries	Goals	Field goals
246	Valentine Holmes	North Queensland Cowboys	14	95	0
223	Jamayne Isaako	Dolphins	12	87	1
206	Nick Meaney	Melbourne Storm	5	93	0
204	Sam Walker	Sydney Roosters	7	88	0
190	Reuben Garrick	Manly Warringah Sea Eagles	10	75	0

Top 5 try scorers

Tries	Player	Club
24	Alofiana Khan-Pereira	Gold Coast Titans
22	Kyle Feldt	North Queensland Cowboys
19	Dom Young	Sydney Roosters
19	Daniel Tupou	Sydney Roosters
18	Tommy Talau	Manly Warringah Sea Eagles

Top 5 goal kickers

Goals	Player	Club
95	Valentine Holmes	North Queensland Cowboys
93	Nick Meaney	Melbourne Storm
88	Sam Walker	Sydney Roosters
87	Jamayne Isaako	Dolphins
75	Reuben Garrick	Manly Warringah Sea Eagles

Top 5 tacklers

Tackles	Player	Club
1,178	Reed Mahoney	Canterbury-Bankstown Bulldogs
959	Jacob Liddle	St. George Illawarra Dragons
937	Blayke Brailey	Cronulla-Sutherland Sharks
909	Morgan Smithies	Canberra Raiders
908	Tom Eisenhuth	St. George Illawarra Dragons

== Attendances ==
=== Club figures ===
Team	Games	Total	Average	Highest
Brisbane Broncos	12	478,470	39,873	46,224
Canberra Raiders	11*	153,542	13,958	18,049
Canterbury-Bankstown Bulldogs	12	250,181	20,848	45,496
Cronulla-Sutherland Sharks	11*	125,789	11,435	13,500
Dolphins	12	259,510	21,626	50,049
Gold Coast Titans	11*	178,649	16,241	25,278
Manly Warringah Sea Eagles	11*	205,474	18,679	40,746
Melbourne Storm	11*	218,338	19,849	26,106
New Zealand Warriors	11*	254,830	23,166	24,495
Newcastle Knights	12	271,623	22,635	29,433
North Queensland Cowboys	12	231,370	19,281	24,230
Parramatta Eels	12	218,298	18,192	29,171
Penrith Panthers	12	226,472	18,873	21,525
South Sydney Rabbitohs	11*	161,396	14,672	35,275
St. George Illawarra Dragons	12	180,430	15,036	40,727
Sydney Roosters	12	280,365	23,364	40,746
Wests Tigers	11*	136,635	12,421	17,351

* = Magic Round home game not counted

=== Top regular season crowds ===
Rank	Home team	Away team	Crowd	Venue	City	Round
1	Dolphins	Brisbane Broncos	50,049	Suncorp Stadium	Brisbane	26
2	Brisbane Broncos	Dolphins	46,224	Suncorp Stadium	Brisbane	6
3	Brisbane Broncos	North Queensland Cowboys	45,793	Suncorp Stadium	Brisbane	4
4	Canterbury-Bankstown Bulldogs	Parramatta Eels	45,496	Accor Stadium	Sydney	14
5	Brisbane Broncos	Penrith Panthers	42,433	Suncorp Stadium	Brisbane	18
6	Brisbane Broncos	Gold Coast Titans	42,221	Suncorp Stadium	Brisbane	12
7	Brisbane Broncos	Canterbury-Bankstown Bulldogs	42,213	Suncorp Stadium	Brisbane	21
8	Brisbane Broncos	Cronulla-Sutherland Sharks	41,004	Suncorp Stadium	Brisbane	14
9	Manly Warringah Sea Eagles	South Sydney Rabbitohs	40,746	Allegiant Stadium	Paradise	1
9	Sydney Roosters	Brisbane Broncos	40,746	Allegiant Stadium	Paradise	1
10	St. George Illawarra Dragons	Sydney Roosters	40,727	Allianz Stadium	Sydney	8
11	Brisbane Broncos	Sydney Roosters	40,190	Suncorp Stadium	Brisbane	9
12	Sydney Roosters	South Sydney Rabbitohs	37,594	Allianz Stadium	Sydney	3
13	Brisbane Broncos	Canberra Raiders	37,286	Suncorp Stadium	Brisbane	7
14	Brisbane Broncos	Parramatta Eels	36,289	Suncorp Stadium	Brisbane	25
15	Brisbane Broncos	South Sydney Rabbitohs	35,507	Suncorp Stadium	Brisbane	2
16	Canterbury-Bankstown Bulldogs	Manly Warringah Sea Eagles	35,502	Accor Stadium	Sydney	26
17	South Sydney Rabbitohs	Canterbury-Bankstown Bulldogs	35,275	Accor Stadium	Sydney	4
18	Brisbane Broncos	Melbourne Storm	35,086	Suncorp Stadium	Brisbane	27
19	Brisbane Broncos	St. George Illawarra Dragons	34,224	Suncorp Stadium	Brisbane	19
20	Dolphins	North Queensland Cowboys	32,477	Suncorp Stadium	Brisbane	1
21	Canterbury-Bankstown Bulldogs	North Queensland Cowboys	32,437	Accor Stadium	Sydney	27
22	Newcastle Knights	Dolphins	29,433	McDonald Jones Stadium	Newcastle	27
23	Parramatta Eels	Canterbury-Bankstown Bulldogs	29,171	CommBank Stadium	Sydney	1
24	Parramatta Eels	Wests Tigers	28,608	CommBank Stadium	Sydney	4
25	Dolphins	New Zealand Warriors	28,056	Suncorp Stadium	Brisbane	23

=== Magic Round (Round 11) ===
Home team	Away team	Date	Time	Venue	Match Figure	Day Total
Canberra Raiders	Canterbury-Bankstown Bulldogs	Friday, 17 May	6:00 pm	Suncorp Stadium	50,971	50,971
Manly Warringah Sea Eagles	Brisbane Broncos	Friday, 17 May	8:05 pm	Suncorp Stadium	50,971	50,971
Gold Coast Titans	Newcastle Knights	Saturday, 18 May	3:00 pm	Suncorp Stadium	38,154	50,708
Cronulla-Sutherland Sharks	Sydney Roosters	Saturday, 18 May	5:30 pm	Suncorp Stadium	48,934	50,708
South Sydney Rabbitohs	North Queensland Cowboys	Saturday, 18 May	7:45 pm	Suncorp Stadium	50,708	50,708
New Zealand Warriors	Penrith Panthers	Sunday, 19 May	1:50 pm	Suncorp Stadium	40,472	47,517
Melbourne Storm	Parramatta Eels	Sunday, 19 May	4:05 pm	Suncorp Stadium	47,517	47,517
Wests Tigers	Dolphins	Sunday, 19 May	6:25 pm	Suncorp Stadium	47,517	47,517
Bye: St. George Illawarra Dragons

=== Finals ===
Rank	Home team	Away team	Crowd	Venue	City
1	Melbourne Storm	Penrith Panthers	80,156	Accor Stadium	Sydney
2	Canterbury-Bankstown Bulldogs	Manly Warringah Sea Eagles	50,714	Accor Stadium	Sydney
3	Sydney Roosters	Manly Warringah Sea Eagles	40,818	Allianz Stadium	Sydney
4	Penrith Panthers	Cronulla-Sutherland Sharks	33,753	Accor Stadium	Sydney
5	Melbourne Storm	Sydney Roosters	29,213	AAMI Park	Melbourne
6	Melbourne Storm	Cronulla-Sutherland Sharks	26,326	AAMI Park	Melbourne
7	North Queensland Cowboys	Newcastle Knights	24,861	Queensland Country Bank Stadium	Townsville
8	Penrith Panthers	Sydney Roosters	21,483	BlueBet Stadium	Sydney
9	Cronulla-Sutherland Sharks	North Queensland Cowboys	19,124	Allianz Stadium	Sydney

== Match officials ==
- Includes Finals matches

Referee	Games
Grant Atkins	28
Gerard Sutton	27
Todd Smith	25
Ashley Klein	25
Adam Gee	24
Peter Gough	20
Chris Butler	19
Liam Kennedy	14
Wyatt Raymond	12
Belinda Sharpe	8
Ziggy Przeklasa-Adamski	6
Kasey Badger	3
Chris Sutton	2

== 2024 transfers ==
Player	2023 Club	2024 Club
Kurt Capewell	Brisbane Broncos	New Zealand Warriors
Herbie Farnworth	Brisbane Broncos	Dolphins
Thomas Flegler	Brisbane Broncos	Dolphins
Keenan Palasia	Brisbane Broncos	Gold Coast Titans
Jarrod Croker	Canberra Raiders	Retirement
Matt Frawley	Canberra Raiders	Leeds Rhinos (Super League)
Jack Wighton	Canberra Raiders	South Sydney Rabbitohs
Paul Alamoti	Canterbury-Bankstown Bulldogs	Penrith Panthers
Jake Averillo	Canterbury-Bankstown Bulldogs	Dolphins
Braidon Burns	Canterbury-Bankstown Bulldogs	South Sydney Rabbitohs (NSW Cup)
Raymond Faitala-Mariner	Canterbury-Bankstown Bulldogs	St. George Illawarra Dragons
Kyle Flanagan	Canterbury-Bankstown Bulldogs	St. George Illawarra Dragons
Jayden Okunbor	Canterbury-Bankstown Bulldogs	Hull F.C. (Super League)
Tevita Pangai Junior	Canterbury-Bankstown Bulldogs	Souths Logan Magpies (Hostplus Cup)
Josh Reynolds	Canterbury-Bankstown Bulldogs	Retirement
Luke Thompson	Canterbury-Bankstown Bulldogs	Wigan Warriors (Super League)
Corey Waddell	Canterbury-Bankstown Bulldogs	Manly Warringah Sea Eagles
Wade Graham	Cronulla-Sutherland Sharks	Retirement
Matt Moylan	Cronulla-Sutherland Sharks	Leigh Leopards (Super League)
Connor Tracey	Cronulla-Sutherland Sharks	Canterbury-Bankstown Bulldogs
Herman Ese'ese	Dolphins	Hull F.C. (Super League)
Poasa Faamausili	Dolphins	Canterbury-Bankstown Bulldogs
Brenko Lee	Dolphins	Brisbane Tigers (Hostplus Cup)
Kruise Leeming	Gold Coast Titans	Wigan Warriors (Super League)
Morgan Harper	Manly Warringah Sea Eagles	Parramatta Eels
Sean Keppie	Manly Warringah Sea Eagles	South Sydney Rabbitohs
Kelma Tuilagi	Manly Warringah Sea Eagles	Parramatta Eels
Christian Tuipulotu	Manly Warringah Sea Eagles	St. George Illawarra Dragons
Tom Eisenhuth	Melbourne Storm	St. George Illawarra Dragons
George Jennings	Melbourne Storm	Western Suburbs (Illawarra Rugby League)
Justin Olam	Melbourne Storm	Wests Tigers
Tariq Sims	Melbourne Storm	Catalans Dragons (Super League)
Fa'amanu Brown	Newcastle Knights	Hull F.C. (Super League)
Adam Clune	Newcastle Knights	Huddersfield Giants (Super League)
Lachlan Fitzgibbon	Newcastle Knights	Warrington Wolves (Super League)
Hymel Hunt	Newcastle Knights	Ryde-Eastwood Hawks (Ron Massey Cup)
Kurt Mann	Newcastle Knights	Canterbury-Bankstown Bulldogs
Dominic Young	Newcastle Knights	Sydney Roosters
Joshua Curran	New Zealand Warriors	Canterbury-Bankstown Bulldogs
Bayley Sironen	New Zealand Warriors	Catalans Dragons (Super League)
Viliami Vailea	New Zealand Warriors	North Queensland Cowboys
Brayden Wiliame	New Zealand Warriors	Retirement
Mitchell Dunn	North Queensland Cowboys	Retirement
Brendan Elliot	North Queensland Cowboys	Retirement
Ben Hampton	North Queensland Cowboys	Retirement
Peta Hiku	North Queensland Cowboys	Hull Kingston Rovers (Super League)
Luciano Leilua	North Queensland Cowboys	St. George Illawarra Dragons
Gehamat Shibasaki	North Queensland Cowboys	South Sydney Rabbitohs
James Tamou	North Queensland Cowboys	Townsville Blackhawks (Hostplus Cup)
Waqa Blake	Parramatta Eels	St. Helens (Super League)
Andrew Davey	Parramatta Eels	Retirement
Josh Hodgson	Parramatta Eels	Retirement
Jack Murchie	Parramatta Eels	Huddersfield Giants (Super League)
Jack Cogger	Penrith Panthers	Newcastle Knights
Stephen Crichton	Penrith Panthers	Canterbury-Bankstown Bulldogs
Zac Hosking	Penrith Panthers	Canberra Raiders
Spencer Leniu	Penrith Panthers	Sydney Roosters
Jaeman Salmon	Penrith Panthers	Canterbury-Bankstown Bulldogs
Jed Cartwright	South Sydney Rabbitohs	Newcastle Knights
Hame Sele	South Sydney Rabbitohs	St. George Illawarra Dragons
Daniel Suluka-Fifita	South Sydney Rabbitohs	Canterbury-Bankstown Bulldogs
Blake Taaffe	South Sydney Rabbitohs	Canterbury-Bankstown Bulldogs
Talatau Amone	St. George Illawarra Dragons	Suspension
Billy Burns	St. George Illawarra Dragons	Cronulla-Sutherland Sharks
Tyrell Fuimaono	St. George Illawarra Dragons	Retirement
Tautau Moga	St. George Illawarra Dragons	Retirement
Zane Musgrove	St. George Illawarra Dragons	Warrington Wolves (Super League)
Jayden Sullivan	St. George Illawarra Dragons	Wests Tigers
Corey Allan	Sydney Roosters	St. George Illawarra Dragons
Fletcher Baker	Sydney Roosters	Brisbane Broncos
Nathan Brown	Sydney Roosters	Manly Warringah Sea Eagles
Drew Hutchison	Sydney Roosters	Canterbury-Bankstown Bulldogs
Paul Momirovski	Sydney Roosters	Leeds Rhinos (Super League)
Jaxson Paulo	Sydney Roosters	Manly Warringah Sea Eagles
Jake Turpin	Sydney Roosters	Canterbury-Bankstown Bulldogs
Shawn Blore	Wests Tigers	Melbourne Storm
Luke Brooks	Wests Tigers	Manly Warringah Sea Eagles
Daine Laurie	Wests Tigers	Penrith Panthers
David Nofoaluma	Wests Tigers	Salford Red Devils (Super League)
Will Smith	Wests Tigers	Western Suburbs (Newcastle Rugby League)
Tommy Talau	Wests Tigers	Manly Warringah Sea Eagles
Brandon Wakeham	Wests Tigers	Blacktown Workers Sea Eagles (NSW Cup)
Will Pryce	Huddersfield Giants (Super League)	Newcastle Knights
Jake Clifford	Hull F.C. (Super League)	North Queensland Cowboys
Brad Schneider	Hull Kingston Rovers (Super League)	Penrith Panthers
Aidan Sezer	Leeds Rhinos (Super League)	Wests Tigers
Zane Tetevano	Leeds Rhinos (Super League)	Canterbury-Bankstown Bulldogs
Thomas Mikaele	Warrington Wolves (Super League)	North Queensland Cowboys
Kai Pearce-Paul	Wigan Warriors (Super League)	Newcastle Knights
Morgan Smithies	Wigan Warriors (Super League)	Canberra Raiders
Roger Tuivasa-Sheck	Blues (Super Rugby)	New Zealand Warriors
Solomon Alaimalo	Canterbury (National Provincial Championship)	Wests Tigers
Chanel Harris-Tavita	Hiatus	New Zealand Warriors
Michael Jennings	Suspension	Sydney Roosters
Bronson Xerri	Suspension	Canterbury-Bankstown Bulldogs

=== Mid-season transfers ===
Player	Original Club	New Club	Date of transfer
Fa'amanu Brown	Hull F.C. (Super League)	St. George Illawarra Dragons	16 April
Jack Gosiewski	North Queensland Cowboys	Brisbane Broncos	29 April
Braidon Burns	South Sydney Rabbitohs (NSW Cup)	North Queensland Cowboys	6 May
Aaron Schoupp	Gold Coast Titans	Manly Warringah Sea Eagles	20 May
Jake Simpkin	Wests Tigers	Manly Warringah Sea Eagles	3 June
Tevita Pangai Junior	Souths Logan Magpies (Hostplus Cup)	Dolphins	7 June
Asu Kepaoa	Wests Tigers	Penrith Panthers	12 June
Aaron Pene	Melbourne Storm	Leigh Leopards (Super League)	14 June
Mark Nawaqanitawase	New South Wales Waratahs (Super Rugby)	Sydney Roosters	2 July
Carter Gordon	Melbourne Rebels (Super Rugby)	Gold Coast Titans	3 July
Jarrod Wallace	Dolphins	Catalans Dragons (Super League)	26 July
Reimis Smith	Melbourne Storm	Catalans Dragons (Super League)	1 August

=== Loan moves ===
Player	Home club	→ Loan club	Dates	Pld	Ref
John Bateman	Wests Tigers	Warrington Wolves (Super League)	26 July – 12 October (Round 21 – end of season)	10	

=== Coaches ===
Coach	2023 Club	2024 Club
Tim Sheens	Wests Tigers	N/A
Shane Flanagan	N/A	St. George Illawarra Dragons
Des Hasler	N/A	Manly Warringah Sea Eagles
