= Sareka Mooka =

PNG international rugby league footballer (born 1999)

Personal information
- Full name: Sareka Mooka
- Born: 10 December 1999 (age 26) Cairns, Queensland, Australia
- Height: 166 cm (5 ft 5 in)
- Weight: 84 kg (13 st 3 lb)

Playing information
- Position: Prop
Club
Years	Team	Pld	T	G	FG	P
2023–24	Nth Qld Cowboys	12	1	0	0	4
Representative
Years	Team	Pld	T	G	FG	P
2022	Prime Minister's XIII	1	0	0	0	0
2023	Indigenous All Stars	1	0	0	0	0
2023–24	Papua New Guinea	4	0	0	0	0
2024–26	PNG PM's XIII	2	0	0	0	0
- Source: As of 3 October 2026

Sareka Mooka (born 10 December 1999) is an Australian professional rugby league footballer.

A prop or second-row, she is a Prime Minister's XIII and Indigenous All Stars representative and played for the North Queensland Cowboys in the NRL Women's Premiership.

== Background ==
Mooka was born in Cairns, Queensland and is of Torres Strait Islander descent. She played her junior rugby league for the Upper Ross Rams and attended Kirwan State High School.

== Playing career ==
=== Early years ===
In 2022, Mooka played for the North Queensland Gold Stars in the QRL Women's Premiership, starting at second-row in their Grand Final win over the Central Queensland Capras. On 25 September 2022, she represented the Prime Minister's XIII in their win over Papua New Guinea.

=== 2023 ===
In February, Mooka represented the Indigenous All Stars in their loss to the Māori All Stars. In March, she played for the Mackay Cutters in the QRL Women's Premiership.

On 5 May, she signed a two-year contract with the North Queensland Cowboys.

In Round 1 of the 2023 NRL Women's season, she made her NRLW debut, starting at prop in a 16–6 loss to the Gold Coast Titans. In Round 2, she scored her first try in a 31–20 win over the Newcastle Knights.

=== 2024 ===
On 25 May, Mooka came off the bench and scored a try in the Cutters' QRLW Grand Final win over the Norths Devils.

In Round 2 of the 2024 NRL Women's season, she made her first appearance of the season for the Cowboys, coming off the bench in a 38–34 win over the St George Illawarra Dragons.

=== 2026 ===
She came off the bench to play for PNG Prime Minister's XIII on 3 October 2026 in the 6-66 defeat to Prime Minister's XIII in Port Moresby.
