= Thomas Mikaele =

New Zealand rugby league footballer

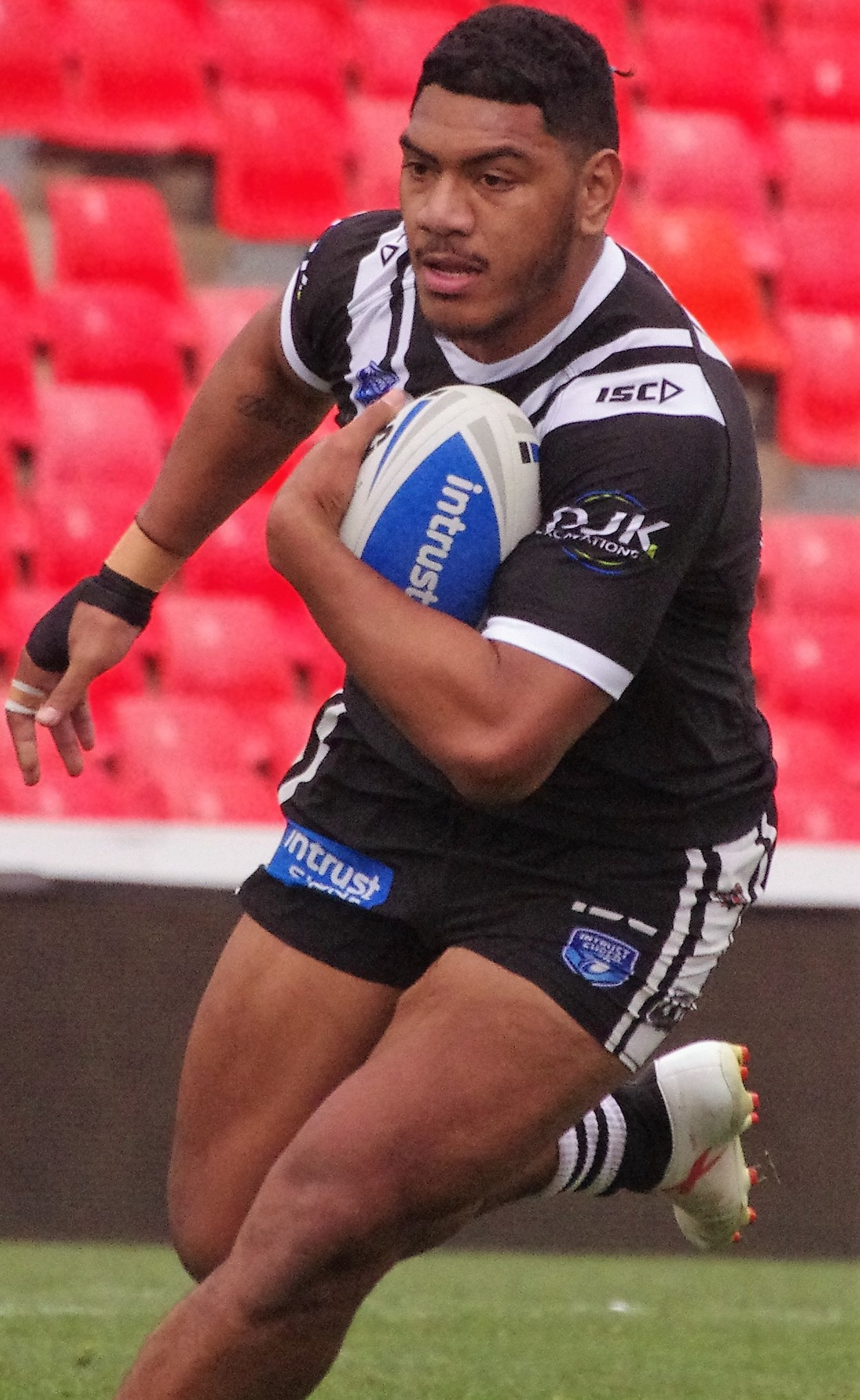

Personal information
- Born: 11 January 1998 (age 28) Auckland, New Zealand
- Height: 192 cm (6 ft 4 in)
- Weight: 115 kg (18 st 2 lb)

Playing information
- Position: Prop
Club
Years	Team	Pld	T	G	FG	P
2019–22	Wests Tigers	66	0	0	0	0
2022–23	Warrington Wolves	18	4	0	0	16
2023	Gold Coast Titans	1	0	0	0	0
2023	Warrington Wolves	6	0	0	0	0
2024–	Nth Qld Cowboys	43	0	0	0	0
	Total	134	4	0	0	16
- Source: As of 5 September 2026

Thomas Mikaele (born 11 January 1998) is a professional rugby league footballer who plays as a prop for the North Queensland Cowboys in the National Rugby League (NRL).

He previously played for the Wests Tigers, Gold Coast Titans and Warrington Wolves.

== Background ==
Mikaele was born in Auckland, New Zealand, and is of Samoan descent.

He grew up in Ipswich, Queensland and played his junior rugby league for the Goodna Eagles. From 2015 to 2016, while attending Keebra Park State High School, he was selected twice for the Australian Schoolboys.

== Playing career ==
In 2014, Mikaele played for the Ipswich Jets in the Cyril Connell Cup, before moving up to their Mal Meninga Cup team in 2015. In 2015, he was selected in the Queensland under-18 team, scoring a try in their 22–18 win over New South Wales. In 2016, he again represented the Queensland under-18 team, starting at prop in a loss to New South Wales.

In 2017, Mikaele joined the Wests Tigers, playing for their NRL Under-20s and Jersey Flegg Cup sides.

=== 2019 ===
In Round 1 of the 2019 NRL season, Mikaele made his NRL debut against the Manly-Warringah Sea Eagles at Leichhardt Oval. He made 23 appearances over the course of the season, only missing one game in first grade, and re-signed with the Tigers until the end of the 2021 season. Starting the season from the bench, he finished playing in the starting team at prop. He was one of the competition's leaders in attracting defenders, with 4 needed for 65% of his attacking runs.

At season's end, Mikaele was diagnosed with keratoconus. He said, "I couldn't see about 15 metres in front of me so a ball coming to me was hard to catch at times or something happening further up the field. I didn't realise I had eye problems beyond just needing glasses. I started having a lot of handling errors from last year and then over the off-season. I noticed at training I couldn't see as far even with my contacts in."

=== 2020 ===
Mikaele played 18 games for Wests in the 2020 NRL season. The club missed the finals by finishing 11th on the table.

=== 2021 ===
Mikaele played a total of 19 games for the Wests Tigers in the 2021 NRL season as the club finished a disappointing 13th and missed the finals.

=== 2022 ===
On 23 May, he was granted an immediate release from his Wests Tigers contract to join English side Warrington on a two-and-a-half-year deal.

=== 2023 ===
On 31 March, Mikaele was granted an immediate release from his Warrington contract on compassionate grounds. Mikaele then signed a contract to join the Gold Coast. Mikaele left Warrington despite the club sitting on top of the Super League table. While with the Titans, Mikaele played just one game, spending the majority of his time with the Burleigh Bears in the Queensland Cup.

On 2 August, Warrington re-signed Mikaele for the remainder of the season, three days after coach Daryl Powell left the club by mutual consent following a run of eight losses in nine games.

On 7 December, he joined the North Queensland Cowboys on a one-year development contract.

=== 2024 ===
On 27 February, after two tries in a trial against Canberra, Mikaele was promoted to the Cowboys' Top 30 squad. Mikaele played 12 games for North Queensland in the 2024 NRL season as they finished 5th on the table and qualified for the finals.

=== 2026 ===
On 16 March, North Queensland announced that they had re-signed Mikaele until the end of 2028. He played 21 matches for North Queensland in the 2026 NRL season as the club finished 8th and qualified for the finals. He played in the clubs elimination final loss to Cronulla.

== Statistics ==
Year	Team	Games	Tries	Pts
2019	Wests Tigers	23		
2020	Wests Tigers	18		
2021	Wests Tigers	19		
2022	Wests Tigers	6		
2022	Warrington Wolves	11	1	4
2023	Warrington Wolves	13	3	12
2023	Gold Coast Titans	1		
2024	North Queensland Cowboys	12		
2025	North Queensland Cowboys	10		
2026	North Queensland Cowboys	3		
	Totals	117	4	16
