= Sean Mullany =

New Zealand professional rugby league player

Personal information
- Born: 27 August 1999 (age 27) Auckland, New Zealand
- Height: 180 cm (5 ft 11 in)
- Weight: 91 kg (14 st 5 lb)

Playing information
- Position: Hooker
Club
Years	Team	Pld	T	G	FG	P
2025–	Gold Coast Titans	3	0	0	0	0
- Source: As of 21 October 2026

Sean Mullany (born 27 August 1999) is a New Zealand rugby league footballer who plays as a hooker for the Gold Coast Titans in the National Rugby League.

== Background ==
Born in Auckland, Mullany played his junior rugby league for the Glenora Bears. He attended Avondale College before being signed by the North Queensland Cowboys in 2016. While living in Townsville he attended Ignatius Park College.

== Playing career ==
=== Early career ===
In 2017, while a member of the Cowboys Under-20s squad, Mullany played for the Townsville Blackhawks in the Mal Meninga Cup. In 2018, he played for Townsville's Hastings Deering Colts side, starting at hooker in their Grand Final loss to the Norths Devils.

In 2019, Mullany returned to New Zealand, joining the New Zealand Warriors where he played for their Jersey Flegg Cup and NSW Cup sides.

From 2021 to 2024, he played for the Mackay Cutters in the Queensland Cup, captaining the side in 2023 and 2024. In 2024, he underwent pre-season training with the Cowboys, scoring a try in their trial loss to the Brisbane Broncos.

=== 2025 ===
Mullany joined the Gold Coast Titans for the 2025 preseason on a train and trial contract, eventually earning a full-time development contract. He started the season playing for the Tweed Seagulls.

In Round 5 of the 2025 NRL season, Mullany made his NRL for the Titans in a 36–10 loss to the Dolphins.
