= Valentine Holmes =

Australia & Cook Islands international rugby league footballer

Val Holmes
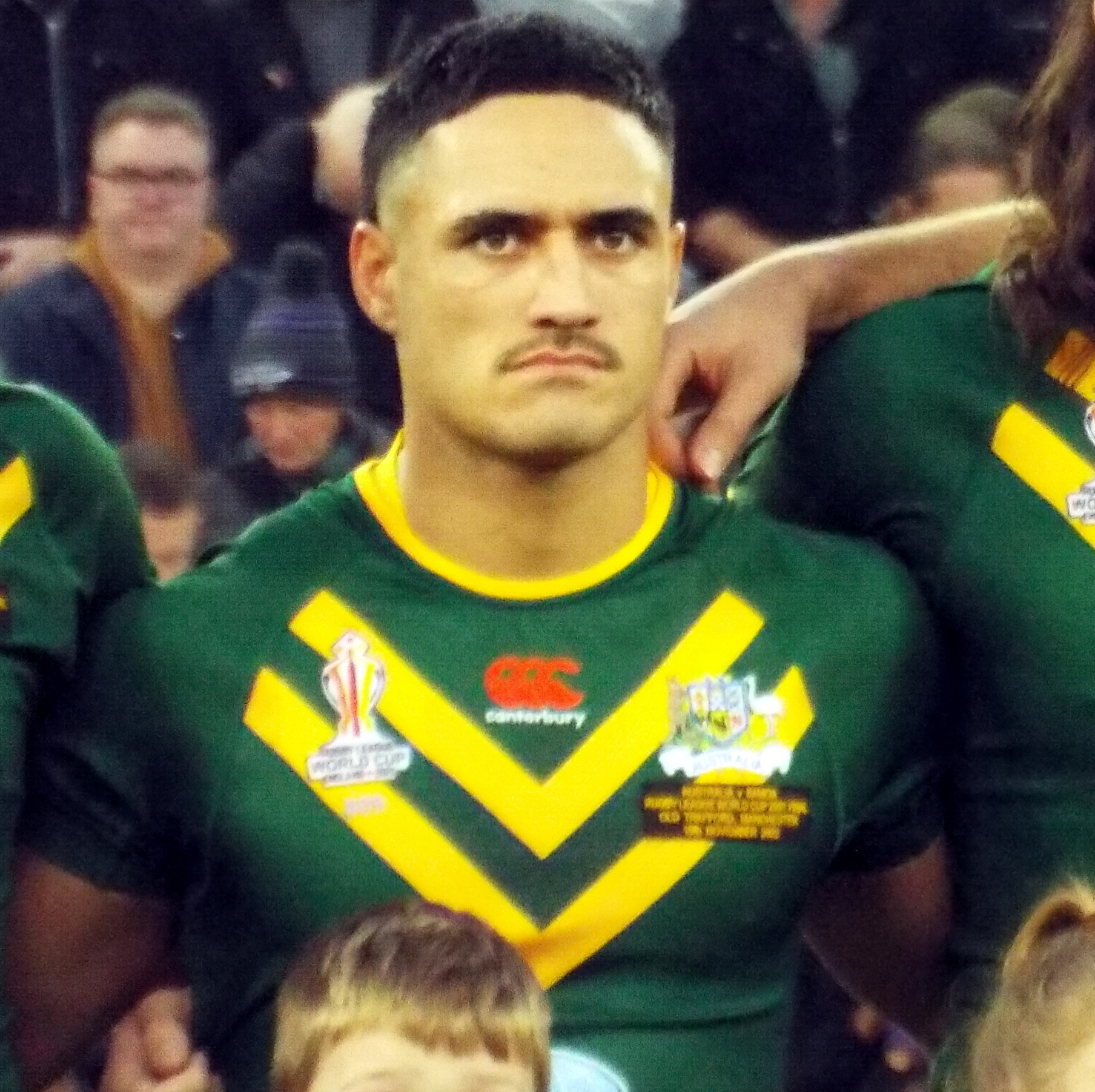

Personal information
- Full name: Valentine Holmes
- Born: 24 July 1995 (age 31) Townsville, Queensland, Australia
- Height: 181 cm (5 ft 11 in)
- Weight: 94 kg (14 st 11 lb)

Playing information
- Position: Centre, Wing, Fullback
Club
Years	Team	Pld	T	G	FG	P
2014–18	Cronulla Sharks	105	66	51	3	369
2020–24	North Qld Cowboys	98	42	347	7	871
2025–	St. George Illawarra	38	16	99	0	262
	Total	241	124	497	10	1502
Representative
Years	Team	Pld	T	G	FG	P
2016–23	Australia	21	20	22	0	124
2017–25	Queensland	22	13	51	0	154
2026–	Cook Islands	2	0	3	0	6
- Source: As of 22 November 2026
- Football career

Profile
- Position: Running back / return specialist

Career information
- High school: Ignatius Park College, Kirwan State High School (Townsville, Australia)

Career history
- New York Jets (2019)
- Stats at Pro Football Reference

Valentine John Holmes (born 24 July 1995) is a professional rugby league footballer who plays as a centre or winger for the St. George Illawarra Dragons in the National Rugby League and Queensland Maroons in State of Origin. He has played for both Australia and the Cook Islands at international level.

Holmes previously played for the Cronulla-Sutherland Sharks in the NRL, with whom he won the 2016 NRL Grand Final as a winger. Holmes previously played for the North Queensland Cowboys, where he would transition into a centre from fullback. Holmes has played for Australia at international level as a winger, fullback and centre. Holmes was a winger for the Australian teams that won the 2016 Four Nations, the 2017 Rugby League World Cup and the 2022 Rugby League World Cup. Holmes has played in 4 State of Origin series wins for Queensland. In 2019, spent several months on the practice squad for the New York Jets of the National Football League (NFL) as a part of the league's International Player Pathway Program.

== Background ==
Holmes was born in Townsville, Queensland to a Cook Islands mother and a New Zealand father.

He has three older brothers and an older sister.

He played his junior rugby league in Townsville for the Western Lions, before being signed by National Rugby League club, the Cronulla-Sutherland Sharks, in 2012 at the age of 17.

== Rugby league career ==
=== Early career ===
Holmes moved to Sydney in 2013 to play for the Cronulla-Sutherland SG Ball Cup team. Later that year, he made his debut for the Sharks NYC team, scoring 17 tries in 10 games and played representative rugby league for the Queensland Under 18s team. In September 2013, Holmes, whose father is from New Zealand, was named in the 2013 Junior Kiwis train-on squad. In December 2013, Holmes was named in the 2014 Queensland Academy of Sport Under 20s Emerging Origin squad. Holmes played 33 games, scored 24 tries and kicked 53 goals for 202 points in his U20s career from 2013 to 2015.

=== 2014 ===
In February, Holmes was selected in the Cronulla Auckland Nines squad. He played for the Queensland Under 20s team at fullback in the 30–8 loss to the Under 20s New South Wales team at Penrith Stadium. In Round 21, Holmes made his NRL debut for Cronulla-Sutherland against the Parramatta Eels on the wing in the 32–12 loss at Remondis Stadium filling in for Sosaia Feki who succumbed to an injury before the match. On 6 August, he extended his contract with the Cronulla club from the end of 2015, to the end of 2017. In Round 23 against the Melbourne Storm at AAMI Park, Holmes scored his first NRL try in the 6–48 loss. Holmes finished his debut year in the NRL with him playing in 6 matches and scoring 3 tries. Holmes was named at wing in the 2014 NYC Team of the Year.

On 8 September, Holmes was named in the 2014 Junior Kangaroos train-on squad. A day later he was named in the New Zealand Kiwis train-on squad for the 2014 Four Nations. On 12 September, he pledged his allegiance to Australia. On 18 October, Holmes played on the wing for the Junior Kangaroos against the Junior Kiwis at Mt Smart Stadium, scoring two tries in the 14–15 loss.

=== 2015 ===
Holmes played for Cronulla-Sutherland in the 2015 NRL Auckland Nines. On 2 May, he again played on the wing for the Junior Kangaroos against the Junior Kiwis, scoring a try and kicking 1 goal in the 22-20 win. In Round 10 against the Gold Coast Titans, he kicked a field goal to win the match for Cronulla in their 23-22 golden-point extra-time victory at Cbus Super Stadium. In Round 19 against the Canberra Raiders, he repeated his efforts, kicking another field goal in extra-time to win the match 21-20. He finished off the season as Cronulla's highest try-scorer with 16 tries, as well as kicking 11 goals and 3 field goals in 25 matches.

=== 2016 ===
Holmes was selected in the QAS Emerging Maroons squad, but on 31 January, while in the Emerging Maroons camp, he broke curfew and was fined for public nuisance and obstructing Queensland Police. The QRL announced he would be excluded from its representative programs for the next 12 months. He was then stood down from the Sharks' 2016 NRL Auckland Nines squad after previously being named. In Round 10 against the Newcastle Knights, he scored 4 tries in Cronulla-Sutherland's 62-0 win. Holmes was part of the squad which won the 2016 NRL Grand Final, 14-12 against the Melbourne Storm. Holmes finished the season playing 23 games and scoring 19 tries, once again Cronulla's highest try scorer.

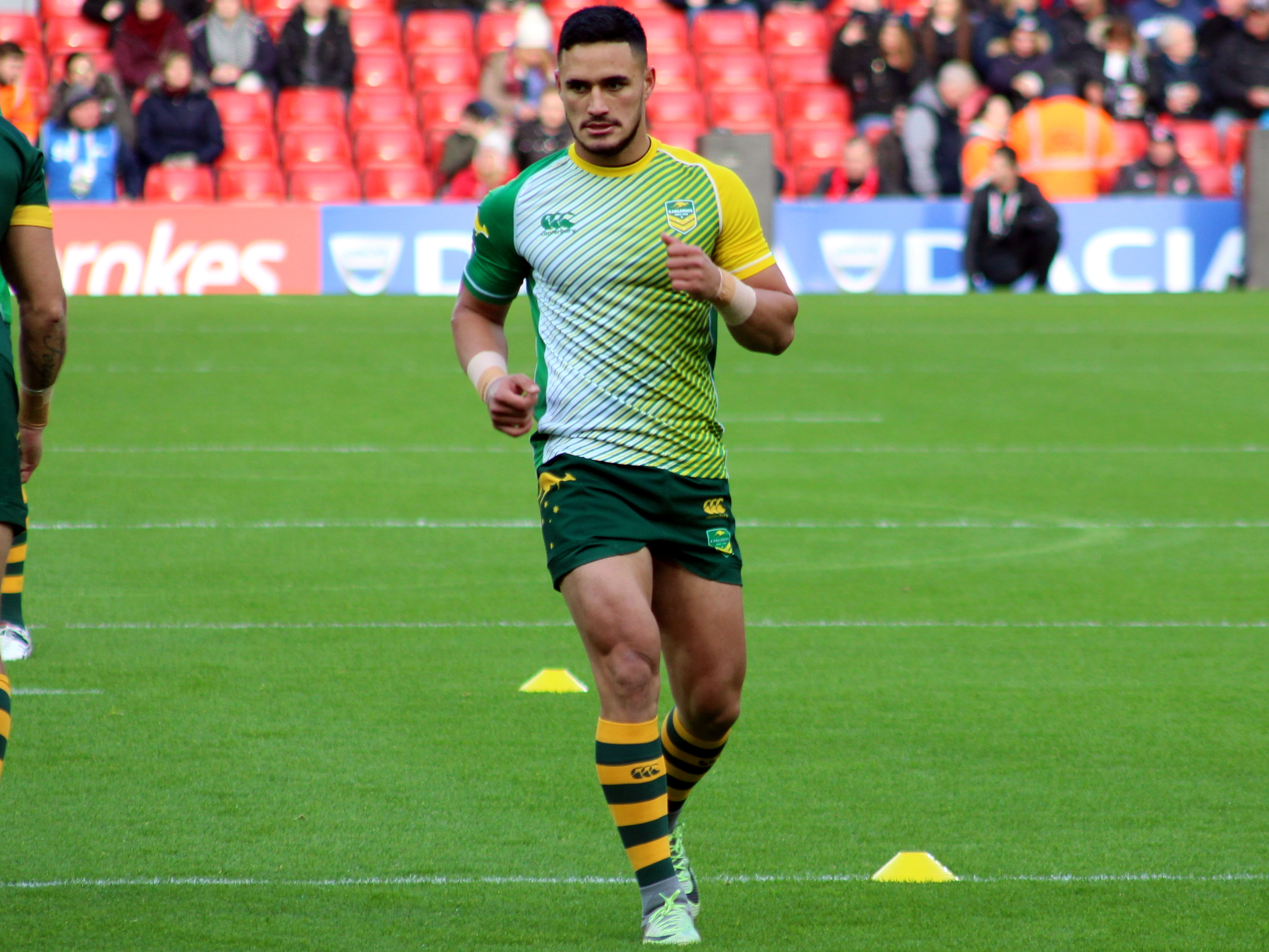
Holmes warming up for the Kangaroos at Anfield in 2016

Holmes was later selected for the Australian test side to face New Zealand on 15 November. Holmes scored a try on debut for the Australians in his side's 26-6 win.

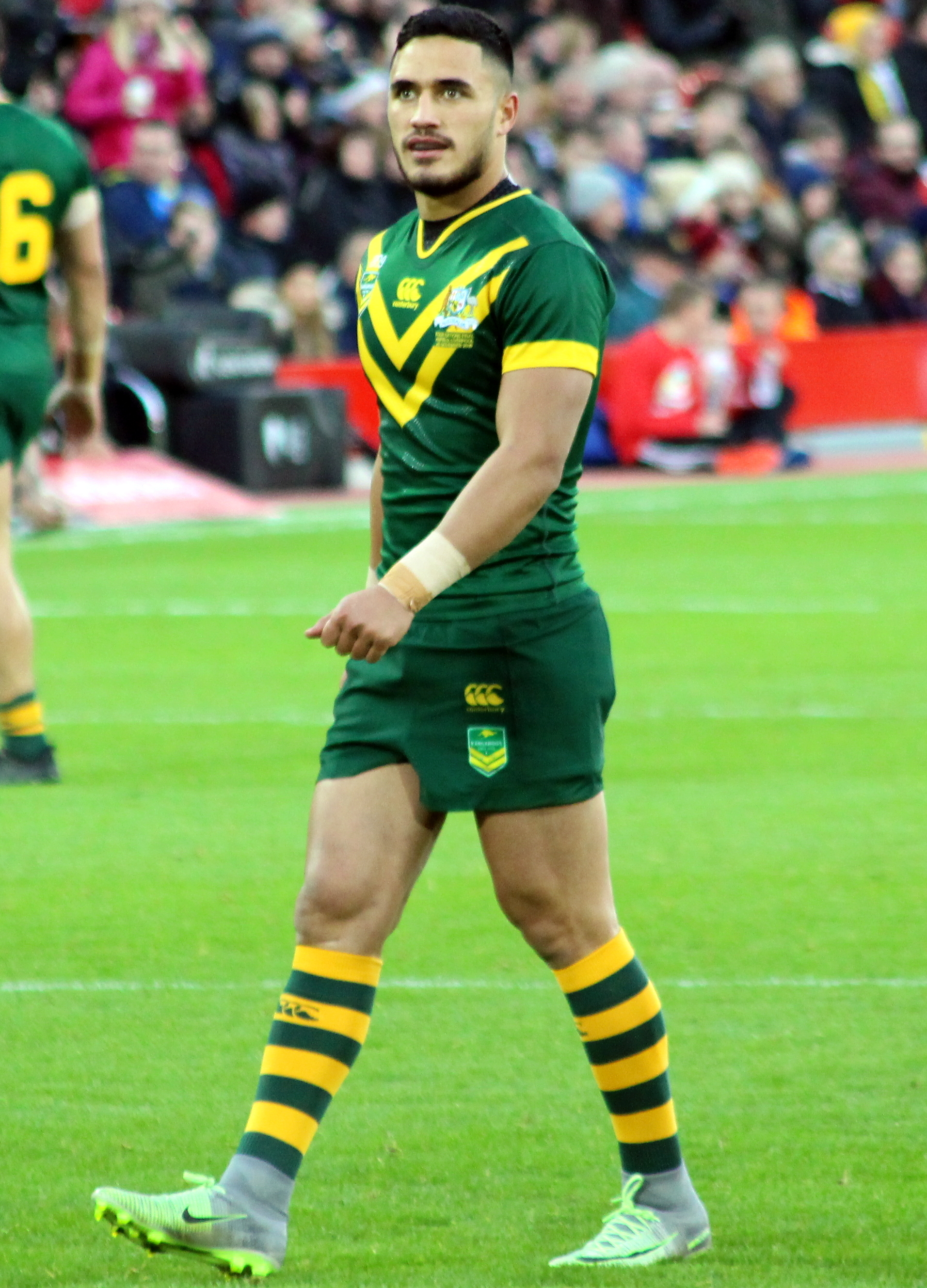
Holmes playing for the Kangaroos in the Four Nations Final in 2016

=== 2017 ===
Holmes was selected to play for Australia in the 2017 ANZAC Test. Later that season, he was selected to make his State of Origin debut for Queensland in Game II, scoring a try. He was then selected in Game III, where he scored three tries.

After being named in Australia's 2017 Rugby League World Cup squad, Holmes set a Test and World Cup record by scoring five tries in the quarter-final against Samoa in Darwin. Only a week later, he broke his own record by scoring six tries in the semi-final against Fiji at Suncorp Stadium. He set another record by scoring a total of twelve tries throughout the World Cup.

=== 2018 ===
In round 12 of the 2018 NRL season against the Newcastle Knights, Holmes scored a hat trick of tries in Cronulla's 48-10 win at Hunter Stadium. At the season's conclusion, Holmes was the second highest try-scorer and lead the season in highest amount of line-breaks. At the end of the season, Holmes won the Monty Porter Medal for Player of the Year and the Tommy Bishop Player's Player Award.

In November 2018, Holmes was released from his contract with the Cronulla-Sutherland Sharks in the National Rugby League to chase his dream to one day play in the National Football League. Two years earlier, Holmes and North Queensland Cowboys forward Jason Taumalolo attended NFL trials in Los Angeles, with fifteen NFL teams expressing interest in both.

=== 2020 ===
On 24 November 2019, Holmes returned to rugby league, signing a six-year deal with the North Queensland Cowboys, beginning in 2020.

In Round 1 of the 2020 NRL season, he made his debut for North Queensland in their 21–28 loss to the Brisbane Broncos. He scored the team's first try in the game, becoming the first Cowboys player to score a try at Queensland Country Bank Stadium. In Round 5, Holmes injured his ankle in a loss to the New Zealand Warriors, which ruled him out for two weeks.

In his second game back from injury, a 16–42 loss to the Sydney Roosters, Holmes reinjured his ankle and missed seven weeks. He returned from injury in Round 16, against his former club, the Cronulla-Sutherland Sharks. In Round 17, Holmes kicked the winning field goal in golden point to defeat the St. George Illawarra Dragons 23–22 and snap North Queensland's nine-game losing streak.

In the final game of the season, a 32–16 win over Brisbane, Holmes was charged by the match review committee for a shoulder charge and was suspended for one game. On 7 October 2020, he was named in the Queensland squad for the 2020 State of Origin series. After missing Game 1 through suspension, Holmes started at fullback in Queensland's 10–34 Game 2 loss to New South Wales. In Game 3, Holmes started on the wing for Queensland, scoring a try and kicking four goals, in their series-deciding win.

=== 2021 ===
In round 9 of the 2021 NRL season, Holmes kicked the winning field goal for North Queensland as they defeated arch-rivals Brisbane 19-18. In round 12, Holmes kicked another winning field goal as North Queensland defeated the New Zealand Warriors 29-28.

On 30 May, Holmes was named in the Queensland squad for the 2021 State of Origin Series. He was named on the wing before an injury to Kalyn Ponga forced him into the fullback role for the 50-6 loss to New South Wales.

=== 2022 ===
In June, Holmes was selected for game one of the 2022 State of Origin series by Queensland. In round 15 of the 2022 NRL season, he scored two tries in North Queensland's come from behind win over Manly. In round 19, Holmes kicked a penalty goal after the siren to win the match for North Queensland against the Wests Tigers by 27–26.

In round 25, Holmes scored a hat-trick in North Queensland's 38-8 victory over a second string Penrith outfit. In the 2022 Qualifying Final, Holmes kicked a two-point drop goal in extra-time as North Queensland defeated Cronulla-Sutherland 32-30.

Holmes would play a total of 24 matches for North Queensland throughout 2022 including the clubs shock preliminary final loss to Parramatta at the Queensland Country Bank Stadium. Holmes finished as the competitions top point scorer with 244 points.

In October he was named in the Australia squad for the 2021 Rugby League World Cup.

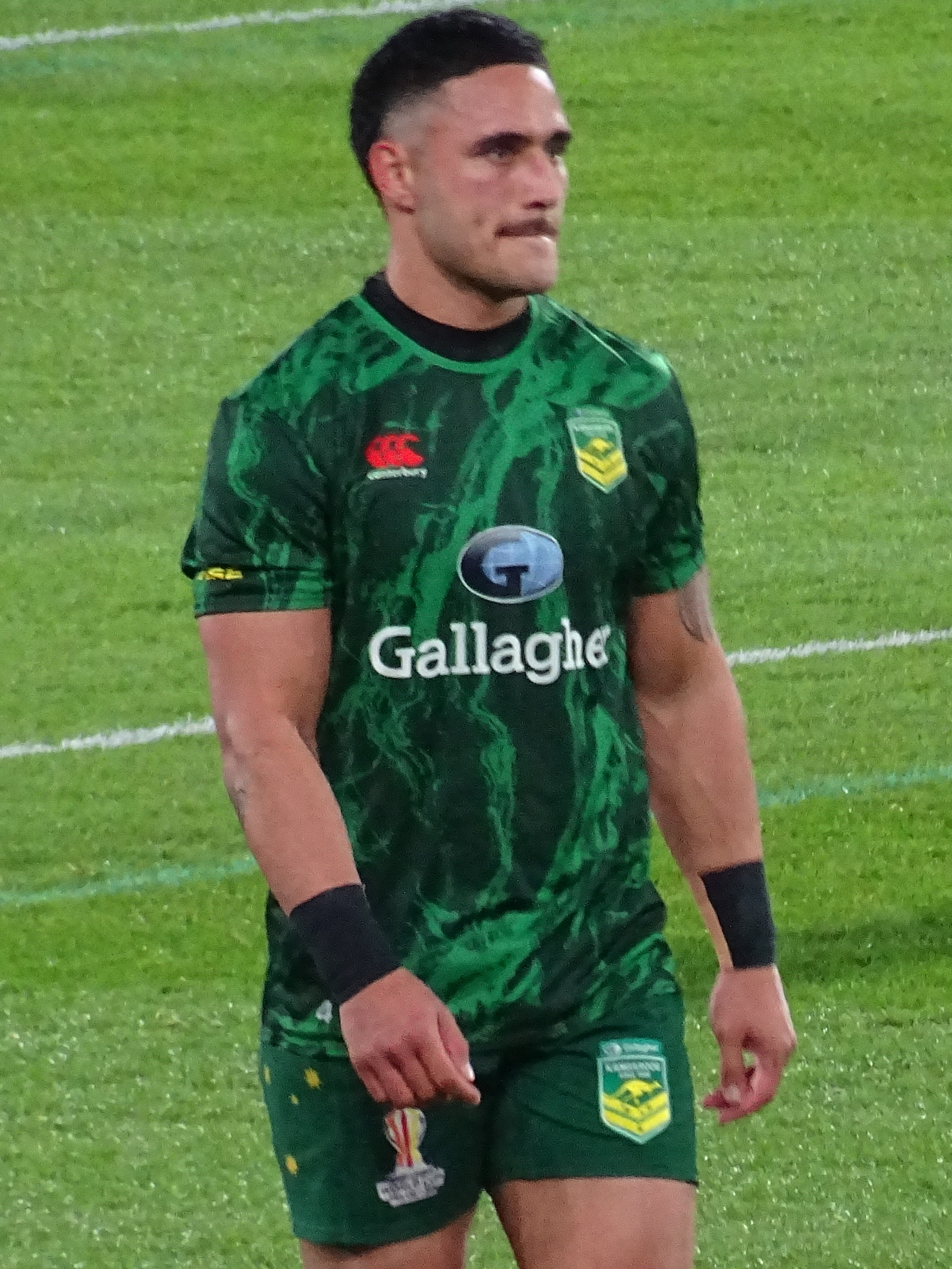
Holmes warming up for the Kangaroos in 2022

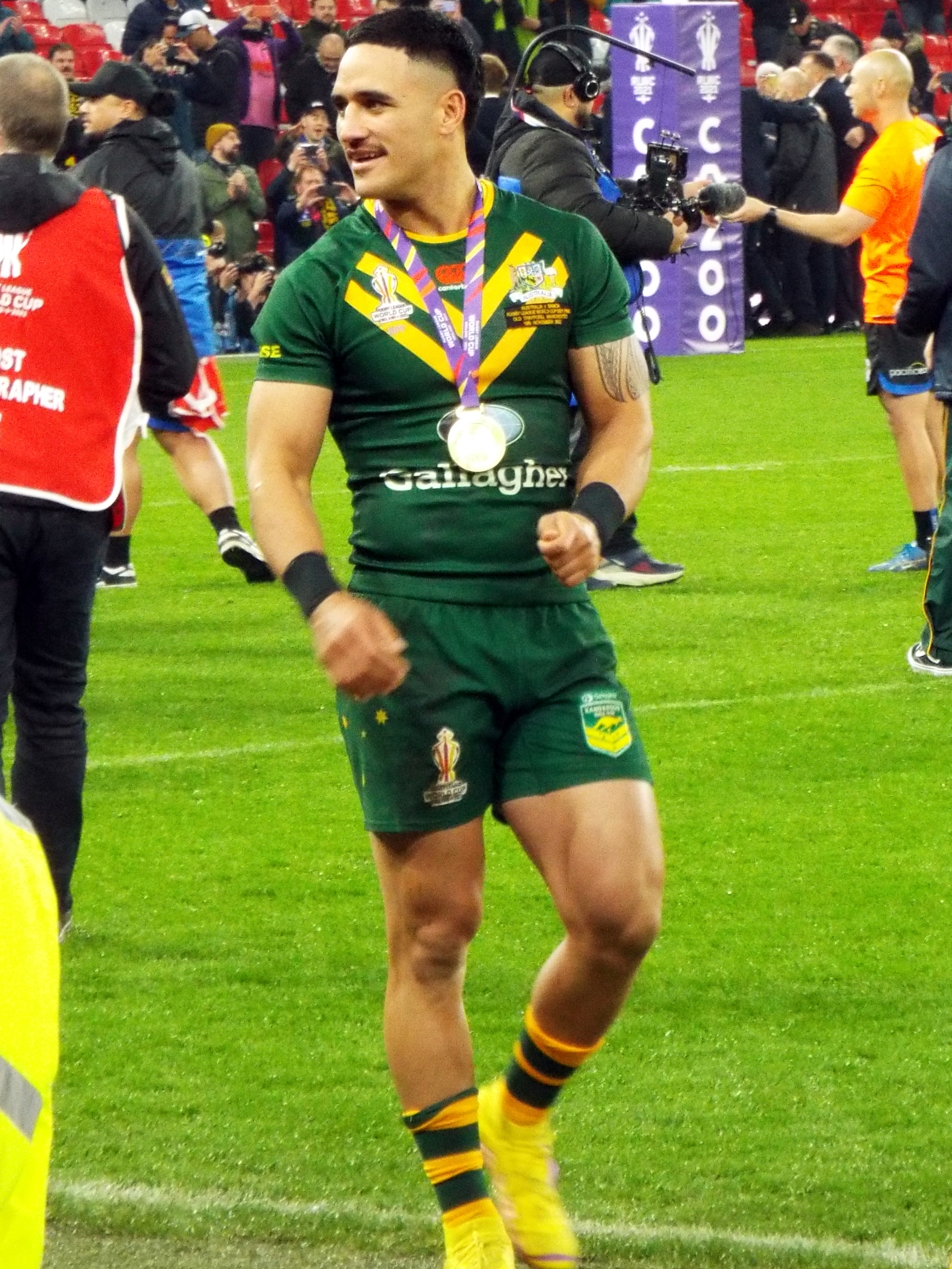
Holmes after winning the 2021 RLWC in 2022

=== 2023 ===
In May, Holmes was selected by Queensland for the 2023 State of Origin series. In round 17 of the 2023 NRL season, Holmes scored two tries and kicked five goals as North Queensland upset South Sydney 31-6. In round 18, Holmes scored the most points by a North Queensland player in a game when he scored two tries and kicked eleven goals totalling 30 points in the clubs 74-0 victory over the Wests Tigers. Holmes played 18 games for North Queensland in the 2023 NRL season as the club finished 11th on the table. He finished as the clubs top point scorer with 170 points.

On 10 September 2023, Holmes became the subject of investigations by the NRL Integrity Unit and the North Queensland Cowboys after posting a photo to his Instagram showing himself with a white bag in his mouth. On 13 September, Holmes was issued a breach notice by the NRL for allegedly bringing the game and his club into disrepute.

=== 2024 ===
In round 12 of the 2024 NRL season, Holmes scored two tries and kicked six goals for North Queensland in their 42-28 victory over strugglers the Wests Tigers.

On 15 August, Holmes signed a three-year deal with the St. George Illawarra Dragons starting in the 2025 NRL season. In round 24, Holmes scored a hat-trick and kicked seven goals as North Queensland defeated Canberra 42-4.

=== 2025 ===
In round 1 of the 2025 NRL season, Holmes made his club debut for St. George Illawarra in their 28-20 loss against Canterbury. Holmes was ruled out for the rest of the season after suffering a shoulder injury in Round 19.

=== 2026 ===
Holmes played 22 matches for St. George Illawarra in the 2026 NRL season as the club finished with the Wooden Spoon. It was the clubs first wooden spoon and the first any St. George affiliated side had received since 1938.

He made his Cook Islands international début in the 2026 Rugby League World Cup 82-16 defeat to New Zealand on 25 October 2026, scoring 2 goals.

== Achievements and accolades ==
=== Individual ===
- Cronulla-Sutherland Sharks Monty Porter Medal: 2018
- Cronulla-Sutherland Sharks Players' Player Award: 2018
- Cronulla-Sutherland Sharks Members' Player of the Year: 2018
- Cronulla-Sutherland Sharks Team of the Half Century: 2017
- 2017 Rugby League World Cup Team of the Tournament: 2017
- NYC Team of the Year: 2014

=== Team ===
- 2016 NRL Grand Final: Cronulla-Sutherland Sharks – Winners
- 2017 Rugby League World Cup: Australia – Winners
- 2021 Rugby League World Cup: Australia – Winners

== Statistics ==
=== NRL ===
Statistics correct to Round 24 of the 2026 season

†	Denotes seasons in which Holmes won an NRL Premiership

Season	Team	Matches	T	G	GK %	F/G	Pts
2014	Cronulla-Sutherland	6	3	0	–	0	12
2015	Cronulla-Sutherland	25	16	11	84.62%	3	89
2016†	Cronulla-Sutherland	26	19	2	28.57%	0	80
2017	Cronulla-Sutherland	22	6	10	83.33%	0	44
2018	Cronulla-Sutherland	26	22	28	75.68%	0	144
2020	North Queensland	12	4	24	70.59%	1	65
2021	North Queensland	20	4	54	73.97%	2	126
2022	North Queensland	23	10	96	82.05%	3 (Note: Includes 1 two point field goal.)	236
2023	North Queensland	18	8	68	82.93%	1 (Note: Includes 1 two point field goal.)	170
2024	North Queensland	24	16	101	84.87%	0	266
2025	St. George Illawarra Dragons	14	6	45			114
2026	St. George Illawarra Dragons	22	10	53			146
Career totals		240	124	497	76.38%	10	1502

=== International ===
†	Denotes years in which Holmes won a World Cup Title

Season	Team	Matches	T	G	GK %	F/G	Pts
2016	Australia	4	2	0	—	0	8
2017†	Australia	7	12	0	—	0	48
2018	Australia	2	3	9	81.82%	0	30
2022†	Australia	6	2	7	100%	0	22
Career totals		19	19	16	90.91%	0	108

=== State of Origin ===
†	Denotes seasons in which Holmes won a State of Origin Series

Season	Team	Matches	T	G	GK %	F/G	Pts
2017†	Queensland	2	4	0	—	0	16
2018	Queensland	3	4	6	66.67%	0	28
2020†	Queensland	2	1	5	83.33%	0	14
2021	Queensland	3	0	3	100.00%	0	6
2022†	Queensland	3	2	7	77.78%	0	22
2023†	Queensland	3	2	8	61.54%	0	24
2024	Queensland	3	0	12	100.00%	0	24
2025†	Queensland	3	0	10	83.33%	0	20
Career totals		22	13	51	79.69%	0	150

== American football career ==
In April 2019, Holmes was signed by the New York Jets as part of the NFL's International Player Pathway program. He made appearances in the New York Jets preseason against the New York Giants on 9 August, carrying 3 times for 6 yards and receiving 3 times for 30 yards. Against the Atlanta Falcons on 15 August, he carried 3 times for 3 yards. He did not play in the third game against the New Orleans Saints. In the fourth game against the Philadelphia Eagles he made 5 receptions for 55 yards. He was waived by the Jets during final roster cuts, but was added to the Jets' practice squad on 1 September 2019, as an exempt international player. He was released on 22 November 2019.
