= 2025 Parramatta Eels season =

79th season of Parramatta Eels

- NRL Rank: 11th
- 2025 record: Wins: 10; losses: 14
- Points scored: For: 502; against: 578

Team information
- CEO: Jim Sarantinos
- Coach: (Australia) Jason Ryles
- Captain: (Australia) Mitchell Moses
- Stadium: CommBank Stadium
- Avg. attendance: 15,904
- Agg. attendance: 190,851
- High attendance: 24,059 (v. Canterbury-Bankstown Bulldogs, Round 3, 23 March)

Top scorers
- Tries: (Australia) Josh Addo-Carr (8)
- Goals: (Australia) Zac Lomax (24)
- Points: (Australia) Zac Lomax (57)
← 2024	List of seasons	2026 →

The 2025 Parramatta Eels season was the 79th season in the club's history and the 28th in the National Rugby League. Coached by new head coach Jason Ryles, and captained by Mitchell Moses for his first season, the team competed in the 2025 NRL Telstra Premiership during the regular season and participated in the Pre-season Challenge in February.

On 18 November 2024, it was announced that the club's 12-year long partnership with the Northern Territory Government would conclude this season, ending the decade of a single home game in Darwin with a 12–50 defeat to the Canberra Raiders in round 6.

== Summary ==
=== Pre-season ===
Parramatta took on the Newcastle Knights in Newcastle for their first match of the Pre-season Challenge. The Eels then had an away game versus the Wests Tigers at Leichhardt Oval in week 3.

=== Regular season ===
==== March ====
The Eels started off the season with a trip to AAMI Park against the Melbourne Storm, who had won the past 22 round 1 games in a row. Isaiah Iongi, Zac Lomax, Ronald Volkman, Jack Williams, Ryley Smith and Sam Tuivaiti all made their debuts, where Volkman replaced Mitchell Moses who sustained his foot injury. The Eels had a poor start to the game and were dominated by the Storm, conceding 8 tries by half-time and found themselves trailing 46–6. In the second half, Parramatta grabbed a couple of tries thanks to Will Penisini and Iongi, ended the game with a loss of 56–18 and were ranked bottom of the table.

In the second game, the Eels faced the Wests Tigers at home, under the 37 degrees heat at kick-off. Jordan Samrani and Kitione Kautoga both made their debuts following their transfers from the Bulldogs. Both teams had chances but could not find a way through in the first 25 minutes, then Parramatta conceded three tries afterwards up until half-time. Three more tries were scored by the Tigers in the second half, where winger Sunia Turuva scored his second and third tries to complete a hat-trick. The Eels could not find a way through until the 79th minute, when winger Sean Russell scored a try to avoid blanking on points, ending with a score of 6–32.

Parramatta then hosted local rivals Canterbury-Bankstown Bulldogs at CommBank Stadium. Dean Hawkins replaced Volkman at halfback on his club debut, whereas winger Josh Addo-Carr scored a try on debut against his former club. The Eels conceded three tries and scored one in the first half through Penisini, and an early try by Addo-Carr in the second half had the Eels regain momentum. Parramatta built up pressure and came close to scoring, but errors had stopped them from a second-half comeback. The Eels then conceded a late penalty inside their half, Stephen Crichton converted it and ended the match 8–16.

The Eels were up against the Manly Warringah Sea Eagles at 4 Pines Park in their final game in March. Joe Ofahengaue played his milestone 200th NRL game, scoring a try in the second half. Both team had chances in the first half, but the Sea Eagles came out on top and had a 12–0 lead. The second half saw Manly extending their lead to 14 points, but Ofahengaue's try would bring the Eels back temporarily. That was until Manly scored two tries and sealing the win, but Shaun Lane grabbed a consolation try in the last minute, adding to the final score of 26–12, which would see the Eels end the month at bottom of the table.

==== April ====
Parramatta started April with a home game against the St. George Illawarra Dragons in the Multicultural Round. Lomax converted an early penalty to give the Eels a 2-point lead, which was cancelled out by a try from the returning Gutherson to his old ground. Dylan Walker made his debut off the bench, then the Eels found an equaliser from winger Addo-Carr, but Gutherson later provided an assist and scored his second try for the Dragons. After being down at 8–20, Parramatta scored two consecutive tries from Iongi and Kautoga to level the score. Late penalties converted from both sides would end the game 22–22 at normal time, as Lomax stepped up to score a field goal in golden point following an error from the Dragons, to seal Parramatta's first win of the season.

The Eels then battled the Canberra Raiders in their final home game in the heat of Darwin, Northern Territory. Raiders' early lead was equalled to by a Dylan Brown try, followed by three more tries by Canberra leading up to half-time. The Eels came out into the second half with Addo-Carr scoring, but Canberra converted a penalty goal to regain a 14-point lead. Canberra turned up their pace and scored another 24 points in 20 minutes to finish at 12–50, the Eels would end their journey up north with yet another big defeat.

An away game against the Wests Tigers in Parramatta were up next in the yearly Easter Monday match, where Mitchell Moses returns to his familiar halfback position back from foot injury. Sean Russell opened the scoring with a penalty goal, followed by an Addo-Carr try from a Moses 40–20 kick. The Tigers hit back with two consecutive tries in 5 minutes, but the Eels responded with Iongi scoring in the corner to tie up the first half 10–10. Parramatta came out of the second half scoring three tries in 6 minutes, which includes Tuivaiti's first try in a first grade match. Turuva of the Tigers and the Eels' Luca Moretti were sin-binned in the 53rd minute for throwing Ryley Smith onto the ground and for striking respectively, Iongi was also binned for professional foul five minutes afterwards. With a one-man advantage, Tigers scored two tries in 6 minutes to put the score at 22–26. The game then ended 22–38 after Parramatta scoring two more converted tries, the Eels came out victors for the second time in the season, and were ranked joint bottom on the ladder.

A bye in the ANZAC round of round 8 took the Eels up to 16th place with 6 competition points.

==== May ====
The Blue and Gold army travelled to Brisbane to play the Cronulla-Sutherland Sharks in this season's Magic Round. The Sharks strike first through Kayal Iro, the Eels hit back with an Addo-Carr try. Cronulla went on to score another try to lead 6 points at half-time, followed by 2 further tries in 7 minutes. The Eels hit back with Addo-Carr scoring his second and Dylan Brown adding to the tally 2 minutes afterwards, making good use of the one-man advantage from a Sharks sin-bin. Cronulla sealed the game with the second try of winger Samuel Stonestreet and a late penalty goal, finishing the contest 28–18 and putting the Eels back to 17th.

Parramatta welcomed the Dolphins at home in the Women in League Round. Dolphins opened the scoring first, but Bailey Simonsson scoring his first try of the season alongside a Russell penalty goal would equal the score 6–6 at half-time. A 6-point lead early in the second half was established by a converted try scored by Matt Doorey, but the Dolphins turned the tie around by scoring a quick-fire double in 4 minutes, despite Dylan Brown scoring a 4-pointer in the 72nd minute, Parramatta lost 16–20 and conversion accuracy proved to be the difference.

The Eels took a trip up north to Newcastle next in round 11.

In round 12, an origin-struck Parramatta side hosted the Manly Warringah Sea Eagles.

==== June ====
To start off June, the Eels played their rivals Penrith Panthers in the Western Sydney Derby in Parramatta. Next up was the Canterbury-Bankstown Bulldogs in the annual King's Birthday match. Round 15 was the second bye week, the Eels remained in 16th on the ladder with 12 competition points. Parramatta then hosted last-place Gold Coast Titans at CommBank Stadium. The Eels ended the June fixtures with an away game in Wollongong facing the St. George Illawarra Dragons during the Beanie for Brain Cancer Round.

==== July ====
The final bye of the season saw Parramatta remain in 15th on the ladder. The second Western Sydney Derby against arch-rivals Penrith Panthers were up next. Six days later, the Eels travelled down to the capital to play the top-ranked Canberra Raiders. The Blue and Gold army then travelled to Suncorp Stadium to face the Brisbane Broncos. July ended for Parramatta with a game hosting the Melbourne Storm.

==== August ====
In the first week of Indigenous round, the Eels welcomed the North Queensland Cowboys at CommBank Stadium. Second week of Indigenous round features an away fixture against the South Sydney Rabbitohs at Moore Park. During round 25 of the Telstra footy country round, Parramatta hosted the Sydney Roosters in the annual Jack Gibson Cup.

Round 26 saw the Eels travel to New Zealand to face the New Zealand Warriors at Auckland.

==== September ====
The final game of the season was a home game against the Newcastle Knights.

=== Post-season ===
On 9 September 2025, Jack Williams won the Ken Thornett Medal.

Mitchell Moses and Jack Williams were called up to feature in the Australian Prime Minister's XIII match against Papua New Guinea Prime Minister's XIII in Port Moresby.

Mitchell Moses and Josh Addo-Carr were selected in Australia's travelling squad for the Ashes Series in England. Zac Lomax was initially called-up, but withdrew due to injury. Dylan Brown (New Zealand), Junior Paulo (Samoa), Isaiah Iongi, Will Penisini (both Tonga) and Kitione Kautoga (Fiji) all received call-ups for their respective nations for the Pacific Championships.

== Squad information ==
=== Playing squad ===
The NRL playing squad of the Parramatta Eels as of 9 March 2025.

Cap	Player	Nationality	Position(s)	Date of birth (age)	Signed	Signed from	Contract until
Top 30 squad
749	Junior Paulo	(Samoa)	Prop	20 November 1993 (aged 31)	2019	Canberra Raiders	2026
788	Mitchell Moses (c)	(Australia)	Halfback, Five-eighth	16 September 1994 (aged 30)	2017	Wests Tigers	2028
800	Dylan Brown	(New Zealand)	Five-eighth	21 June 2000 (aged 24)	2019	Youth	2031
801	Shaun Lane	(Australia)	Second-row, Prop	29 November 1994 (aged 30)	2019	Manly Warringah Sea Eagles	2026
805	Ryan Matterson	(Australia)	Second-row, Lock, Five-eighth	13 October 1994 (aged 30)	2020	Wests Tigers	2026
809	Haze Dunster	(New Zealand)	Wing	1 March 1999 (aged 26)	2020	Youth	2025
813	Bryce Cartwright	(Australia)	Second-row, Lock, Five-eighth	15 November 1994 (aged 30)	2021	Gold Coast Titans	2025
814	Wiremu Greig	(New Zealand)	Prop	12 November 1999 (aged 25)	2021	North Queensland Cowboys	2025
816	Joey Lussick	(Australia)	Hooker	28 December 1995 (aged 29)	2023	St Helens	2025
817	Sean Russell	(Australia)	Wing, Centre, Fullback	27 May 2002 (aged 22)	2021	Youth	2025
819	Will Penisini	(Tonga)	Centre	31 July 2002 (aged 22)	2021	Youth	2026
825	Bailey Simonsson	(New Zealand)	Wing, Centre, Fullback	18 February 1998 (aged 27)	2022	Canberra Raiders	2024
829	Matt Doorey	(Australia)	Second-row	27 June 2000 (aged 24)	2023	Canterbury-Bankstown Bulldogs	2025
830	J'maine Hopgood	(Australia)	Lock	11 May 1999 (aged 25)	2023	Penrith Panthers	2025
834	Brendan Hands	(Australia)	Hooker	2 December 1999 (aged 25)	2023	Youth	2025
835	Joe Ofahengaue	(Tonga)	Lock, Prop	15 September 1995 (aged 29)	2023	Wests Tigers	2025
836	Luca Moretti	(Italy)	Lock, Prop	19 April 2000 (aged 24)	2023	Youth	2025
843	Kelma Tuilagi	(Samoa)	Second-row	16 February 1999 (aged 26)	2024	Manly Warringah Sea Eagles	2025
851	Isaiah Iongi	(Australia)	Fullback	24 June 2003 (aged 21)	2025	Penrith Panthers	2027
852	Zac Lomax	(Australia)	Centre, Wing	24 September 1999 (aged 25)	2024	Youth	2024
854	Jack Williams	(Australia)	Lock, Second-row, Prop	9 September 1996 (aged 28)	2025	Cronulla-Sutherland Sharks	2027
856	Sam Tuivaiti	(Australia)	Prop	17 February 2005 (aged 20)	2024	Youth	2025
857	Jordan Samrani	(Australia)	Centre, Wing	23 January 2002 (aged 23)	2025	Canterbury-Bankstown Bulldogs	2026
858	Kitione Kautoga	(Fiji)	Prop, Second-row	2 September 2002 (aged 22)	2025	Canterbury-Bankstown Bulldogs	2025
859	Dean Hawkins	(Australia)	Halfback, Five-eighth	10 March 1999 (aged 25)	2025	South Sydney Rabbitohs	2026
860	Josh Addo-Carr	(Australia)	Wing	28 July 1995 (aged 29)	2025	Canterbury-Bankstown Bulldogs	2026
861	Dylan Walker	(Australia)	Lock, Five-eighth, Centre	27 September 1994 (aged 30)	2025	New Zealand Warriors	2026
862	Uinitoni Mataele	(Australia)	Second-row	12 December 2002 (aged 22)	2023	Youth	2025
863	Joash Papalii	(Australia)	Five-eighth, Centre	29 June 2004 (aged 20)	2025	Canterbury-Bankstown Bulldogs	2026
Development list
838	Arthur Miller-Stephen	(Australia)	Wing, Fullback	N/A	2022	Youth	2025
847	Jake Tago	(Samoa)	Wing, Centre	10 February 1999 (aged 26)	2024	North Sydney Bears	2025
850	Dan Keir	(Australia)	Lock, Second-row	12 March 1998 (aged 26)	2021	Canberra Raiders	2025
848	Charlie Guymer	(Australia)	Second-row	12 November 2004 (aged 20)	2024	Youth	2025
853	Ronald Volkman	(Australia)	Five-eighth, Halfback	4 July 2004 (aged 20)	2025	New Zealand Warriors	2026
855	Ryley Smith	(Australia)	Hooker	21 February 2003 (aged 22)	2025	Youth	2025
–	Saxon Pryke	(Australia)	Lock	N/A	2025	Youth	2025

=== Coaching staff ===
The coaching staff of the Parramatta Eels for the 2025 NRL season as of 9 March 2025.

Position	Name
NRL head coach	Jason Ryles
General manager of Football	Mark O’Neill
Assistant coaches	Nathan Brown; Sam Moa; Scott Wisemantel
NSW Cup head coach	Nathan Cayless
Jersey Flegg Cup head coach	Craig Brennan

== Squad changes ==
=== Transfers in ===
Date	Pos.	Player	From	Window	Ref.
16 April 2024	WG	(Australia) Zac Lomax	St. George Illawarra Dragons	Pre-season	
22 August 2024	FB	(Tonga) Isaiah Iongi	Penrith Panthers	Pre-season	
27 September 2024	HB	(Australia) Dean Hawkins	South Sydney Rabbitohs	Pre-season	
3 October 2024	LK	(Australia) Jack Williams	Cronulla-Sutherland Sharks	Pre-season	
23 October 2024	FB	(Australia) Joash Papalii	Canterbury-Bankstown Bulldogs	Pre-season	
23 October 2024	CE	(Australia) Jordan Samrani	Canterbury-Bankstown Bulldogs	Pre-season	
18 November 2024	WG	(Australia) Josh Addo-Carr	Canterbury-Bankstown Bulldogs	Pre-season	
5 December 2024	FE	(Australia) Ronald Volkman	New Zealand Warriors	Pre-season	
13 December 2024	SR	(Fiji) Kitione Kautoga	Canterbury-Bankstown Bulldogs	Pre-season	
26 March 2025	LK	(Australia) Dylan Walker	New Zealand Warriors	Mid-season	
30 June 2025	HK	(Australia) Tallyn Da Silva	Wests Tigers	Mid-season	

=== Transfers out ===
Date	Pos.	Player	To	Window	Ref.
20 June 2024	FE	(Australia) Ethan Sanders	Canberra Raiders	Pre-season	
12 August 2024	CE	(Samoa) Blaize Talagi	Penrith Panthers	Pre-season	
21 August 2024	HK	(Australia) Matt Arthur	Newcastle Knights	Pre-season	
21 August 2024	CE	(Australia) Zac Cini	Castleford Tigers	Pre-season	
30 August 2024	FE	(Samoa) Daejarn Asi	Castleford Tigers	Pre-season	
11 September 2024	PR	(New Zealand) Ofahiki Ogden	North Sydney Bears	Pre-season	
11 September 2024	PR	(Cook Islands) Makahesi Makatoa	Sydney Roosters	Pre-season	
11 September 2024	CE	(New Zealand) Morgan Harper	New Zealand Warriors	Pre-season	
11 September 2024	WG	(Fiji) Isaac Lumelume	Northern Pride	Pre-season	
11 September 2024	WG	(New Zealand) Lorenzo Mulitalo	Burleigh Bears	Pre-season	
4 October 2024	PR	(Australia) Reagan Campbell-Gillard	Gold Coast Titans	Pre-season	
26 October 2024	WG	(Fiji) Maika Sivo	Leeds Rhinos	Pre-season	
8 November 2024	FB	(Australia) Clinton Gutherson	St. George Illawarra Dragons	Pre-season	
17 April 2025	LK	(Tonga) Joe Ofahengaue	Leigh Leopards	Mid-season	
17 June 2025	SR	(Australia) Bryce Cartwright	St Marys Saints	Mid-season	
22 July 2025	SR	(Australia) Ryan Matterson	Warrington Wolves (loan)	Mid-season	
30 July 2025	HK	(Australia) Brendan Hands	Toulouse Olympique (loan)	Mid-season	
14 August 2025	SR	(Australia) Shaun Lane	Retirement	Mid-season	

== Pre-season ==
Parramatta played the Newcastle Knights in Newcastle and the Wests Tigers in Leichhardt as their pre-season fixtures. Both matches were part of the third edition of the NRL Pre-season Challenge.

Win Draw Loss Fixtures

Round 1: 14 February 2025	Newcastle Knights	18–44	Parramatta Eels	Newcastle
18:00 AEDT	Tries: Marzhew 22'; Aoake 46'; McCarthy 49'; McEwen 58'; Goals: Pryce 0/1; Votano 1/3 59'	Report	Tries: Brown 2'; Tago 26'; Tuilagi 29'; Papalii 38'; Samrani 61'; Miller-Stephen 64', 77'; Loizou 72'; Goals: Volkman 3/4 4', 31', 39'; Lynn 3/4 63', 65', 78'	Stadium: McDonald Jones Stadium; Attendance: 5,964; Referee: Belinda Sharpe

Round 2: 21 February 2025	Wests Tigers	30–18	Parramatta Eels	Leichhardt
20:00 AEDT	Tries: Naden 26'; Bird 29'; Skelton 39'; Hope 56'; Faataape 75'; Goals: Doueihi 5/5 27', 30', 39', 58', 76'	Report	Tries: Iongi 13'; Russell 35'; Williams 48'; Goals: Lomax 2/2 15', 36'; Volkman 1/1 49'	Stadium: Leichhardt Oval; Referee: Ashley Klein

== Regular season ==
=== Ladder ===
Pos	Team	Pld	W	D	L	B	PF	PA	PD	Pts	Qualification
1	Canberra Raiders	24	19	0	5	3	654	506	+148	44	Advance to finals series
2	Melbourne Storm	24	17	0	7	3	671	459	+212	40	Advance to finals series
3	Canterbury-Bankstown Bulldogs	24	16	0	8	3	534	414	+120	38	Advance to finals series
4	Brisbane Broncos (P)	24	15	0	9	3	680	508	+172	36	Advance to finals series
5	Cronulla-Sutherland Sharks	24	15	0	9	3	599	490	+109	36	Advance to finals series
6	New Zealand Warriors	24	14	0	10	3	517	496	+21	34	Advance to finals series
7	Penrith Panthers	24	13	1	10	3	576	469	+107	33	Advance to finals series
8	Sydney Roosters	24	13	0	11	3	653	521	+132	32	Advance to finals series
9	Dolphins	24	12	0	12	3	721	596	+125	30	
10	Manly Warringah Sea Eagles	24	12	0	12	3	555	534	+21	30	
11	Parramatta Eels	24	10	0	14	3	502	578	−76	26	
12	North Queensland Cowboys	24	9	1	14	3	538	684	−146	25	
13	Wests Tigers	24	9	0	15	3	477	612	−135	24	
14	South Sydney Rabbitohs	24	9	0	15	3	427	608	−181	24	
15	St. George Illawarra Dragons	24	8	0	16	3	498	628	−130	22	
16	Gold Coast Titans	24	6	0	18	3	520	719	−199	18	
17	Newcastle Knights	24	6	0	18	3	338	638	−300	18	

Source: National Rugby League
(P) Premiers

=== Results by round ===
Round	1	2	3	4	5	6	7	8	9	10	11	12	13	14	15	16	17	18	19	20	21	22	23	24	25	26	27
Ground	A	H	H	A	H	H	A	–	N	H	A	H	A	A	–	H	A	–	H	A	A	H	H	A	H	A	H
Result	L	L	L	L	W	L	W	B	L	L	W	W	L	L	B	W	L	B	L	L	W	L	W	L	W	W	W
Position	17	17	17	17	17	17	17	16	17	17	16	15	16	16	16	15	15	15	15	16	14	15	13	14	14	12	11
Points	0	0	0	0	2	2	4	6	6	6	8	10	10	10	12	14	14	16	16	16	18	18	20	20	22	24	26

Source: National Rugby League
A = Away; H = Home; N = Neutral; B = Bye; W = Win; D = Draw; L = Loss

=== Matches ===
The league fixtures were released on 21 November 2024.

Win Draw Loss Bye Fixtures

Round 1: 9 March 2025	Melbourne Storm	56–18	Parramatta Eels	Melbourne
16:05 AEDT	Tries: Papenhuyzen 5', 39'; King 11'; Coates 21', 26'; Katoa 23'; Grant 30'; Meaney 34'; Warbrick 55'; Hughes 57'; Goals: Meaney 8/10 6', 12', 25', 27', 31', 35', 40', 59'	Report	Tries: Tago 37'; Penisini 68'; Iongi 76'; Goals: Lomax 3/3 38', 70', 78'	Stadium: AAMI Park; Attendance: 23,369; Referee: Wyatt Raymond

Round 2: 16 March 2025	Parramatta Eels	6–32	Wests Tigers	Parramatta
16:05 AEDT	Tries: Russell 79'; Goals: Lomax 1/1 80'	Report	Tries: Turuva 26', 67', 72'; To'a 35'; Galvin 39'; Skelton 42'; Goals: Doueihi 4/6 36', 39', 44', 68'	Stadium: CommBank Stadium; Attendance: 18,362; Referee: Grant Atkins

Round 3: 23 March 2025	Parramatta Eels	8–16	Canterbury-Bankstown Bulldogs	Parramatta
16:05 AEDT	Tries: Penisini 18'; Addo-Carr 46'; Goals: Lomax 0/2	Report	Tries: Suluka-Fifita 4'; Xerri 25'; Wilson 33'; Goals: Crichton 2/4 6', 80 pen'	Stadium: CommBank Stadium; Attendance: 24,059; Referee: Wyatt Raymond

Round 4: 30 March 2025	Manly Warringah Sea Eagles	26–12	Parramatta Eels	Brookvale
16:05 AEDT	Tries: Saab 8'; Hopoate 16'; Waddell 62'; Koula 67'; Goals: Garrick 5/6 9', 20 pen', 48 pen', 63', 68'	Report	Tries: Ofahengaue 55'; Lane 79'; Goals: Lomax 2/2 56', 80'	Stadium: 4 Pines Park; Attendance: 17,286; Referee: Todd Smith

Round 5: 5 April 2025	Parramatta Eels	23–22 (g.p.)	St. George Illawarra Dragons	Parramatta
15:00 AEDT	Tries: Addo-Carr 24'; Iongi 56'; Kautoga 62'; Goals: Lomax 5/5 6 pen', 26', 58', 63', 74 pen' Field goals: Lomax 83'	Report	Tries: Gutherson 16', 45'; Tuipulotu 34'; Goals: Holmes 5/5 18', 22 pen', 36', 46', 68 pen'	Stadium: CommBank Stadium; Attendance: 19,302; Referee: Gerard Sutton

Round 6: 12 April 2025	Parramatta Eels	12–50	Canberra Raiders	Darwin
19:05 ACST	Tries: Brown 13'; Addo-Carr 49'; Goals: Russell 2/2 14', 51'	Report	Tries: Tapine 6'; Strange 19'; Young 23', 57'; Timoko 38'; Savage 64'; Nicholson 74'; Kris 77'; Goals: Fogarty 7/7 7', 20', 24', 39', 54 pen', 58', 66'; Weekes 2/2 76', 77'	Stadium: TIO Stadium; Attendance: 9,559; Referee: Wyatt Raymond

Round 7: 21 April 2025	Wests Tigers	22–38	Parramatta Eels	Parramatta
16:00 AEST	Tries: May 22'; Bula 27'; Seyfarth 61'; Laulilii 67'; Goals: Doueihi 3/4 23', 63', 68'; Sin bin: Turuva (yellow card) 53' to 63'	Report	Tries: Addo-Carr 14', 77'; Iongi 32', 47'; Tuilagi 41'; Tuivaiti 44'; Simonsson 74'; Goals: Russell 3/6 3 pen', 43', 45'; Moses 1/1 76'; Smith 1/1 78'; Sin bin: Moretti (yellow card) 53' to 63'; Iongi (yellow card) 58' to 68'	Stadium: CommBank Stadium; Attendance: 26,145; Referee: Liam Kennedy

Round 8 (Bye for Parramatta Eels)

Round 9 (Magic Round): 2 May 2025	Cronulla-Sutherland Sharks	28–18	Parramatta Eels	Brisbane
18:00 AEST	Tries: Iro 9'; Nikora 37'; Stonestreet 49', 71'; McInnes 56'; Goals: Hynes 4/6 11', 39', 58', 79 pen' Sin bin: Colquhoun (yellow card) 52' to 62'	Report	Tries: Addo-Carr 33', 60'; Brown 62'; Goals: Russell 3/3 35', 61', 63'	Stadium: Suncorp Stadium; Attendance: 44,613; Referee: Peter Gough

Round 10: 8 May 2025	Parramatta Eels	16–20	Dolphins	Parramatta
19:50 AEST	Tries: Simonsson 27'; Doorey 42'; Brown 72'; Goals: Russell 2/4 40 pen', 43'	Report	Tries: Bostock 11'; Lemuelu 60'; Farnworth 64'; Goals: Isaako 4/4 13', 61', 65', 70 pen'	Stadium: CommBank Stadium; Attendance: 11,214; Referee: Wyatt Raymond

Round 11: 16 May 2025	Newcastle Knights	6–28	Parramatta Eels	Newcastle
18:00 AEST	Tries: Schiller 74'; Goals: Ponga 1/1 75'; Sin bin: Pearce-Paul (yellow card) 61' to 71'	Report	Tries: Moses 10'; Lomax 14', 55'; Brown 63'; Samrani 66'; Goals: Lomax 4/6 11', 56', 62 pen', 65'	Stadium: McDonald Jones Stadium; Attendance: 20,125; Referee: Todd Smith

Round 12: 23 May 2025	Parramatta Eels	30–10	Manly Warringah Sea Eagles	Parramatta
20:00 AEST	Tries: Samrani 22'; Papalii 24'; Williams 36'; Iongi 46'; Hopgood 60'; Goals: Russell 5/6 26', 37', 47', 61', 64 pen'	Report	Tries: Hopoate 8', 28'; Goals: Garrick 1/2 29'	Stadium: CommBank Stadium; Attendance: 13,425; Referee: Liam Kennedy

Round 13: 1 June 2025	Penrith Panthers	18–10	Parramatta Eels	Parramatta
16:05 AEST	Tries: C. McLean 17'; Jenkins 57'; To'o 73'; Goals: Cleary 3/3 19', 59', 74'	Report	Tries: Russell 3'; Addo-Carr 45'; Goals: Lomax 1/2 46'	Stadium: CommBank Stadium; Attendance: 21,282; Referee: Peter Gough

Round 14: 9 June 2025	Canterbury-Bankstown Bulldogs	30–12	Parramatta Eels	Sydney Olympic Park
16:00 AEST	Tries: Burton 7'; Montoya 19'; Kikau 60'; Hayes 68'; Galvin 73'; Goals: Crichton 5/6 8', 21', 50 pen', 69', 74'; Sin bin: Kikau (yellow card) 35' to 45'	Report	Tries: Moses 11'; Walker 35'; Goals: Lomax 2/2 12', 36'	Stadium: Accor Stadium; Attendance: 59,878; Referee: Gerard Sutton

Round 15 (Bye for Parramatta Eels)

Round 16: 22 June 2025	Parramatta Eels	36–20	Gold Coast Titans	Parramatta
18:15 AEST	Tries: Russell 11'; Lussick 15'; Guymer 20'; Hawkins 48'; Penisini 66', 70'; Goals: Lomax 6/6 13', 17', 22', 49', 67', 71'; Sin bin: Penisini (yellow card) 78' to 80'	Report	Tries: Jolliffe 3'; Randall 28'; Khan-Pereira 34', 62'; Goals: Campbell 1/1 4'; Fermor 1/3 29'	Stadium: CommBank Stadium; Attendance: 8,074; Referee: Gerard Sutton

Round 17: 28 June 2025	St. George Illawarra Dragons	34–20	Parramatta Eels	Wollongong
17:30 AEST	Tries: Lawson 1', 13'; Allan 26'; Flanagan 29'; Holmes 33', 75'; Goals: Holmes 3/5 14', 30', 35'; Flanagan 2/2 76', 79 pen'	Report	Tries: Addo-Carr 22'; Lomax 45'; Hawkins 54'; Tuilagi 56'; Goals: Lomax 2/4 55', 58'	Stadium: WIN Stadium; Attendance: 18,191; Referee: Liam Kennedy

Round 18 (Bye for Parramatta Eels)

Round 19: 13 July 2025	Parramatta Eels	10–32	Penrith Panthers	Parramatta
16:05 AEST	Tries: Kautoga 14'; Lomax 33'; Goals: Lomax 1/2 16'	Report	Tries: Jenkins 21'; Garner 40'; Tago 54'; Alamoti 62'; Cleary 71'; Smith 78'; Goals: Alamoti 4/7 29 pen', 40', 55', 78'	Stadium: CommBank Stadium; Attendance: 22,792; Referee: Peter Gough

Round 20: 19 July 2025	Canberra Raiders	40–16	Parramatta Eels	Canberra
15:00 AEST	Tries: Stuart 3', 52'; Hosking 6'; Sasagi 59'; Pattie 72', 77'; Strange 79'; Goals: Fogarty 6/8 5', 7', 60', 74', 78', 80'	Report	Tries: Guymer 13'; Lomax 28'; Russell 37'; Goals: Lomax 2/3 14', 39'	Stadium: GIO Stadium; Attendance: 20,751; Referee: Ashley Klein

Round 21: 25 July 2025	Brisbane Broncos	20–22	Parramatta Eels	Brisbane
20:00 AEST	Tries: Reynolds 23'; Hetherington 32'; Walters 58'; Goals: Reynolds 3/3 16 pen', 33', 59'; Walsh 1/1 25'	Report	Tries: Russell 20'; Lomax 36', 43'; Addo-Carr 63'; Goals: Lomax 3/5 10 pen', 22', 44'	Stadium: Suncorp Stadium; Attendance: 39,057; Referee: Todd Smith

Round 22: 31 July 2025	Parramatta Eels	10–16	Melbourne Storm	Parramatta
19:50 AEST	Tries: Addo-Carr 24'; Guymer 44'; Goals: Lomax 1/3 54 pen'	Report	Tries: Katoa 16'; Kamikamica 33'; Coates 69'; Goals: Papenhuyzen 1/4 35'; Meaney 1/1 70'	Stadium: CommBank Stadium; Attendance: 9,402; Referee: Gerard Sutton

Round 23: 10 August 2025	Parramatta Eels	19–18	North Queensland Cowboys	Parramatta
16:05 AEST	Tries: Addo-Carr 27', 32'; Penisini 43'; Goals: Lomax 3/4 5 pen', 33', 44'; Field goals: Moses 74'	Report	Tries: Purdue 13', 53'; Burns 51'; Goals: Laybutt 3/4 15', 18 pen', 55'	Stadium: CommBank Stadium; Attendance: 11,562; Referee: Liam Kennedy

Round 24: 16 August 2025	South Sydney Rabbitohs	20–16	Parramatta Eels	Moore Park
19:35 AEST	Tries: Munro 14'; Mamouzelos 35'; Duncan 53', 65'; Goals: Bentley-Hape 0/1; Humphreys 1/1 36'; Ward 1/2 66'	Report	Tries: Iongi 24'; Lomax 30', 71'; Goals: Lomax 2/3 5 pen', 26'; Moses 0/1	Stadium: Allianz Stadium; Attendance: 21,395; Referee: Gerard Sutton

Round 25: 23 August 2025	Parramatta Eels	30–10	Sydney Roosters	Parramatta
19:35 AEST	Tries: Hopgood 9'; Addo-Carr 15', 28'; Moses 51'; Samrani 64', 76'; Goals: Lomax 2/4 11', 52'; Moses 1/2 65'	Report	Tries: Tedesco 23'; Toia 59'; Goals: Savala 1/2 60'	Stadium: CommBank Stadium; Attendance: 19,741; Referee: Wyatt Raymond

Round 26: 29 August 2025	New Zealand Warriors	22–26	Parramatta Eels	Auckland
20:00 NZST	Tries: Pompey 19'; Tuivasa-Sheck 55'; Halasima 60', 70'; Goals: Boyd 3/4 57', 62', 71'	Report	Tries: Addo-Carr 3'; Williams 15'; Iongi 49', 63'; Goals: Lomax 5/5 5', 16', 43 pen', 50', 65'	Stadium: Go Media Stadium; Attendance: 25,012; Referee: Peter Gough

Round 27: 7 September 2025	Parramatta Eels	66–10	Newcastle Knights	Parramatta
16:05 AEST	Tries: Brown 1'; Moses 4', 16', 35'; Smith 20'; Doorey 32'; Addo-Carr 43', 46', 72'; Paulo 48'; Da Silva 75'; Penisini 78'; Goals: Lomax 8/10 3', 18', 21', 34', 36', 47', 50', 73'; Brown 1/2 79'	Report	Tries: McEwen 27'; Marzhew 55'; Goals: Cogger 0/1; Gagai 1/1 57'	Stadium: CommBank Stadium; Attendance: 23,359; Referee: Wyatt Raymond

== Player statistics ==
As of match played 22 June 2025

Players with no appearances are not included on the list.

Player	Apps	T	C	PG	FG	Total
(Australia) Josh Addo-Carr	13	9	0	0	0	36
(New Zealand) Dylan Brown	14	4	0	0	0	16
(Australia) Matt Doorey	8	1	0	0	0	4
(Australia) Charlie Guymer	7	1	0	0	0	4
(Australia) Brendan Hands	2	0	0	0	0	0
(Australia) Dean Hawkins	7	2	0	0	0	8
(Australia) J'maine Hopgood	15	1	0	0	0	4
(Australia) Isaiah Iongi	15	5	0	0	0	20
(Fiji) Kitione Kautoga	14	1	0	0	0	4
(Australia) Dan Keir	1	0	0	0	0	0
(Australia) Shaun Lane	5	1	0	0	0	4
(Australia) Zac Lomax	10	3	23	3	1	65
(Australia) Joey Lussick	4	1	0	0	0	4
(Australia) Toni Mataele	1	0	0	0	0	0
(Australia) Ryan Matterson	3	0	0	0	0	0
(Italy) Luca Moretti	8	0	0	0	0	0
(Australia) Mitchell Moses	6	2	1	0	0	10
(Tonga) Joe Ofahengaue	6	1	0	0	0	4
(Australia) Joash Papalii	5	1	0	0	0	4
(Samoa) Junior Paulo	15	0	0	0	0	0
(Tonga) Will Penisini	13	4	0	0	0	16
(Australia) Sean Russell	14	3	12	3	0	42
(Australia) Jordan Samrani	9	2	0	0	0	8
(New Zealand) Bailey Simonsson	4	2	0	0	0	8
(Australia) Ryley Smith	14	0	1	0	0	2
(Samoa) Jake Tago	1	1	0	0	0	4
(Samoa) Kelma Tuilagi	7	1	0	0	0	4
(New Zealand) Sam Tuivaiti	7	1	0	0	0	4
(Australia) Ronald Volkman	2	0	0	0	0	0
(Australia) Dylan Walker	11	1	0	0	0	4
(Australia) Jack Williams	12	1	0	0	0	4

== Awards ==
The Ken Thornett Medal will be held at the end of the season to recognise the best-performed players of the season for the club. Reagan Campbell-Gillard is the reigning Ken Thornett medalist.

Award	Recipient
Ken Thornett Medal (NRL Player of the Year)	Jack Williams
Nathan Hindmarsh NRL Players' Player Award	Mitchell Moses
Jack Gibson NRL Coaches' Award	Junior Paulo
Eric Grothe NRL Rookie of the Year Award	Isaiah Iongi
Blue & Gold Army NRL Award	Isaiah Iongi
Ray Price NRL Community Award	Jack Williams
Bob O'Reilly NSW Cup Player of the Year	Jordan Samrani
NSW Cup Players' Player	Apa Twidle
Geoff Gerard NSW Cup Coaches' Award	Saxon Pryke
Steve Ella Jersey Flegg Player of the Year	Matthew Hunter
Jersey Flegg Players' Player	Josh Lynn
Brett Kenny Jersey Flegg Coaches' Award	Domenico De Stradis
Michael Cronin Club Person of the Year	Ashley Evans
