= 2026 Parramatta Eels season =

80th season of Parramatta Eels

- NRL Rank: DNQ

Team information
- CEO: Jim Sarantinos
- Coach: (Australia) Jason Ryles
- Captain: (Australia) Mitchell Moses
- Stadium: CommBank Stadium
← 2025	List of seasons	2027 →

The 2026 Parramatta Eels season is the 80th season in the club's history and the 29th in the National Rugby League. Coached by Jason Ryles and captained by Mitchell Moses for their second season, the club competes in the 2026 NRL Telstra Premiership during the regular season and won the 2026 NRL Pre-season Challenge in February. They did not qualify for the regular season finals. Membership tally for 2026 was 33,658.

== Squad changes ==
=== Transfers in ===
Date	Pos.	Player	From	Window	Ref.
25 June 2025	LK	(Papua New Guinea) Jack de Belin	St. George Illawarra Dragons	Pre-season	
29 October 2025	HB	(Australia) Jonah Pezet	Melbourne Storm	Pre-season	
5 January 2026	CE	(Australia) Brian Kelly	Gold Coast Titans	Pre-season	
6 May 2026	LK	(Australia) Harrison Edwards	North Queensland Cowboys	Mid-season	

=== Transfers out ===
Date	Pos.	Player	To	Window	Ref.
14 March 2025	FE	(New Zealand) Dylan Brown	Newcastle Knights	Pre-season	
31 July 2025	FE	(Australia) Matthew Hunter	Newcastle Knights	Pre-season	
7 September 2025	HK	(Australia) Joey Lussick	Retired	Pre-season	
7 September 2025	PR	(New Zealand) Wiremu Greig	Townsville Blackhawks	Pre-season	
7 September 2025	LK	(Australia) Dan Keir	South Sydney Rabbitohs	Pre-season	
7 September 2025	WG	(New Zealand) Haze Dunster	Released	Pre-season	
22 October 2025	HK	(Australia) Brendan Hands	Toulouse Olympique	Pre-season	
23 October 2025	HB	(Australia) Dean Hawkins	London Broncos	Pre-season	
16 November 2025	WG	(Australia) Zac Lomax	Released	Pre-season	

== Pre-season ==
The Parramatta Eels won the 2026 NRL Pre-season Challenge.

Win Draw Loss

Round 1: 15 February 2026	Cronulla-Sutherland Sharks	6–40	Parramatta Eels	Marrickville
18:00 AEDT		Report		Stadium: Henson Park; Attendance: 8,972

Round 2: 21 February 2026	Sydney Roosters	22–28	Parramatta Eels	Gosford
18:00 AEDT		Report		Stadium: Central Coast Stadium; Attendance: 10,006; Referee: Wyatt Raymond

== Regular season ==
=== Ladder ===
Pos	Team	Pld	W	D	L	B	PF	PA	PD	Pts	Qualification
1	Penrith Panthers	24	18	0	6	3	683	347	+336	42	Advance to finals series
2	New Zealand Warriors	24	18	0	6	3	728	418	+310	42	Advance to finals series
3	Dolphins	24	17	0	7	3	662	506	+156	40	Advance to finals series
4	Sydney Roosters (P)	24	16	0	8	3	619	501	+118	38	Advance to finals series
5	Cronulla-Sutherland Sharks	24	14	0	10	3	672	523	+149	34	Advance to finals series
6	South Sydney Rabbitohs	24	14	0	10	3	694	581	+113	34	Advance to finals series
7	Newcastle Knights	24	14	0	10	3	633	591	+42	34	Advance to finals series
8	North Queensland Cowboys	24	13	0	11	3	568	652	−84	32	Advance to finals series
9	Manly Warringah Sea Eagles	24	11	0	13	3	623	524	+99	28	
10	Melbourne Storm	24	11	0	13	3	594	576	+18	28	
11	Canberra Raiders	24	11	0	13	3	581	626	−45	28	
12	Canterbury-Bankstown Bulldogs	24	11	0	13	3	476	536	−60	28	
13	Parramatta Eels	24	9	0	15	3	497	678	−181	24	
14	Brisbane Broncos	24	8	0	16	3	471	677	−206	22	
15	Wests Tigers	24	8	0	16	3	445	699	−254	22	
16	Gold Coast Titans	24	6	0	18	3	477	663	−186	18	
17	St. George Illawarra Dragons	24	5	0	19	3	392	717	−325	16	

Source: National Rugby League
Rules for classification: 1) competition points; 2) points differential; 3) percentage; (Note: Greater percentage of points scored for and against, being determined by points scored for divided by points scored against expressed as a percentage.) 4) tries scored; (Note: Further tiebreakers (in order) include goals scored, field goals kicked; least amount of penalties conceded.)
(P) Premiers

=== Results by round ===
Round	1	2	3	4	5	6	7	8	9	10	11	12	13	14	15	16	17	18	19	20	21	22	23	24	25	26	27
Ground	A	A	H	A	H	H	H	A	H	A	N	–	A	A	H	–	H	H	A	–	H	A	A	H	A	H	A
Result	L	W	W	L	L	L	W	L	L	W	L	B	L	L	W	B	L	W	L	B	L	W	L	W	L	W	L
Position	17	12	9	13	14	16	14	15	15	14	15	14	13	16	15	14	15	14	15	15	15	13	13	13	13	13	13
Points	0	2	4	4	4	4	6	6	6	8	8	10	10	10	12	14	14	16	16	18	18	20	20	22	22	24	24

Source: National Rugby League
A = Away; H = Home; N = Neutral; B = Bye; W = Win; D = Draw; L = Loss

=== Matches ===
The league fixtures were released on 14 November 2025.

Win Draw Loss Bye Fixtures

Round 1: 5 March 2026	Melbourne Storm	52–4	Parramatta Eels	Melbourne
20:00 AEDT	Tries: Warbrick 10'; Grant 14', 50'; Howarth 26'; Chan 46'; Leo 55'; Fa'alogo 63', 76'; Lisati 66'; Goals: Meaney 8/9 11', 16', 27', 47', 52', 57', 64', 77'	Report	Tries: Russell 4'; Goals: Moses 0/1; Sin bin: Hopgood (yellow card) 0' to 10'; Simonsson (yellow card) 65' to 75'	Stadium: Melbourne Rectangular Stadium; Attendance: 18,264; Referee: Todd Smith

Round 2: 12 March 2026	Brisbane Broncos	32–40	Parramatta Eels	Brisbane
19:00 AEST	Tries: Walsh 4', 60'; Staggs 10', 45'; Haas 25'; Goals: Reynolds 6/6 5', 11', pen 22', 26', 47', 62'	Report	Tries: Tuilagi 17', 33'; Smith 30'; Iongi 35', 42'; Russell 67'; Pezet 78'; Goals: Moses 6/8 18', 31', 37', pen 54', 68', 80'	Stadium: Lang Park; Attendance: 39,015; Referee: Wyatt Raymond

Round 3: 22 March 2026	Parramatta Eels	30–20	St. George Illawarra Dragons	Parramatta
16:05 AEDT	Tries: Pezet 10'; Da Silva 34', 44'; Kautoga 38'; Addo-Carr 72'; Goals: Moses 5/5 10', 35', 39', 46', 74'; Sin bin: Guymer (yellow card) 55' to 65'	Report	Tries: Leilua 12'; Su'a 23'; Suli 56'; Goals: Holmes 4/4 pen 3', 13', 25', 57'; Sin bin: R. Couchman (yellow card) 27' to 37'	Stadium: Western Sydney Stadium; Attendance: 25,573; Referee: Ashley Klein

Round 4: 28 March 2026	Penrith Panthers	48–20	Parramatta Eels	Parramatta
17:30 AEDT		Report		Stadium: Western Sydney Stadium; Attendance: 22,813

Round 5: 6 April 2026	Parramatta Eels	20–22	Wests Tigers	Parramatta
16:05 AEST		Report		Stadium: Western Sydney Stadium; Attendance: 29,397

Round 6: 12 April 2026	Parramatta Eels	10–52	Gold Coast Titans	Parramatta
14:00 AEST		Report		Stadium: Western Sydney Stadium; Attendance: 14,382

Round 7: 19 April 2026	Parramatta Eels	38–20	Canterbury-Bankstown Bulldogs	Parramatta
16:05 AEST	Tries: Addo-Carr 13'; Volkman 28'; Papali'i 34'; Walker 57'; Da Silva 70'; Penisini 75'; Goals: Volkman 1/1 15'; Moses 6/6 29', 35', 58', pen 69', 72', 76'	Report	Tries: Kiraz 10'; Galvin 50'; Sua 72'; Xerri 77'; Goals: Burton 2/4 52', 73'	Stadium: Western Sydney Stadium; Attendance: 25,938; Referee: Liam Kennedy

Round 8: 26 April 2026	Manly Warringah Sea Eagles	33–18	Parramatta Eels	Brookvale
16:05 AEST		Report		Stadium: Brookvale Oval; Attendance: 17,389

Round 9: 2 May 2026	Parramatta Eels	14–36	New Zealand Warriors	Parramatta
17:30 AEST		Report		Stadium: Western Sydney Stadium; Attendance: 16,656

Round 10: 8 May 2026	North Queensland Cowboys	30–33	Parramatta Eels	Townsville
20:00 AEST		Report		Stadium: North Queensland Stadium; Attendance: 17,626

Round 11: 16 May 2026	Parramatta Eels	8–34	Melbourne Storm	Brisbane
19:45 AEST		Report		Stadium: Lang Park; Attendance: 48,692

Round 12 (Bye for Parramatta Eels)

Round 13: 30 May 2026	Newcastle Knights	28–22	Parramatta Eels	Newcastle
15:00 AEST		Report		Stadium: Newcastle International Sports Centre; Attendance: 23,001

Round 14: 8 June 2026	Canterbury-Bankstown Bulldogs	14–12	Parramatta Eels	Sydney Olympic Park
16:00 AEST	Tries: Tupouniua 47'; Crichton 50'; Goals: Crichton 3/3 48', 51', pen 76'	Report	Tries: Da Silva 59'; Papalii 61'; Goals: Da Silva 2/2 60', 63'	Stadium: Stadium Australia; Attendance: 37,638; Referee: Todd Smith

Round 15: 13 June 2026	Parramatta Eels	15–12	Canberra Raiders	Parramatta
19:30 AEST		Report		Stadium: Western Sydney Stadium; Attendance: 16,657

Round 16 (Bye for Parramatta Eels)

Round 17: 25 June 2026	Parramatta Eels	12–32	South Sydney Rabbitohs	Parramatta
19:50 AEST		Report		Stadium: Western Sydney Stadium; Attendance: 14,365

Round 18: 5 July 2026	Parramatta Eels	23–12	Manly Warringah Sea Eagles	Parramatta
14:00 AEST		Report		Stadium: Western Sydney Stadium; Attendance: 18,778

Round 19: 11 July 2026	Sydney Roosters	28–12	Parramatta Eels	Moore Park
19:30 AEST		Report		Stadium: Sydney Football Stadium; Attendance: 23,222

Round 20 (Bye for Parramatta Eels)

Round 21: 23 July 2026	Parramatta Eels	18–24	Penrith Panthers	Parramatta
19:50 AEST		Report		Stadium: Western Sydney Stadium; Attendance: 15,562

Round 22: 2 August 2026	Wests Tigers	13–16	Parramatta Eels	Parramatta
16:05 AEST	Tries: Pole 47'; Doueihi 58'; Goals: Doueihi 2/2 48', 60'; Field goals: Doueihi 71'	Report	Tries: Samrani 21'; Da Silva 31'; Iongi 75'; Goals: Moses 2/3 22', 32'	Stadium: Western Sydney Stadium; Attendance: 13,125; Referee: Liam Kennedy

Round 23: 8 August 2026	South Sydney Rabbitohs	28–24	Parramatta Eels	Moore Park
19:30 AEST		Report		Stadium: Sydney Football Stadium; Attendance: 19,077

Round 24: 15 August 2026	Parramatta Eels	32–30	North Queensland Cowboys	Parramatta
17:30 AEST	Tries: Twidle 13'; Volkman 18'; Da Silva 21', 54'; Addo-Carr 42'; Samrani 62'; Goals: Moses 4/7 15', 54', 63', pen 74'	Report	Tries: Mahoney 10'; Burns 29'; Purdue 48'; Cotter 51'; Chester 57'; Goals: Drinkwater 5/5 11', 31', 49', 52', 58'; Sin bin: Luki (yellow card) 20' to 30'	Stadium: Western Sydney Stadium; Attendance: 12,804; Referee: Todd Smith

Round 25: 21 August 2026	Dolphins	34–16	Parramatta Eels	Brisbane
20:00 AEST		Report		Stadium: Suncorp Stadium

Round 26: 30 August 2026	Parramatta Eels	38–18	Cronulla-Sutherland Sharks	Parramatta
16:05 AEST	Tries: Twidle 1'; Penisini 5'; Moses 29'; Volkman 34'; Da Silva 75', 79'; Goals: Moses 6/6 2', 6', pen 14', 31', 36', 76'; Russell 1/1 80'	Report	Tries: Katoa 23', 62'; Brailey 56'; Goals: Hynes 3/4 25', pen 39', 57'	Stadium: Western Sydney Stadium; Attendance: 18,074; Referee: Ashley Klein

Round 27: 6 September 2026	St. George Illawarra Dragons	24–22	Parramatta Eels	Wollongong
14:00 AEST		Report		Stadium: Wollongong Showground

== Post-season ==
On 8 September, Jack Williams and Brian Kelly were joint-awarded the Ken Thornett Medal.

Tallyn Da Silva was called up to feature in the Australian Prime Minister's XIII match against Papua New Guinea Prime Minister's XIII in Port Moresby on 3 October.

Mitchell Moses (Australia), Kitione Kautoga, Jordan Miller (both Fiji), Mohamed Alameddine, Jordan Samrani (both Lebanon), Jack de Belin, Luca Moretti (both Papua New Guinea), Junior Paulo and Ronald Volkman (both Samoa) were all called up for the 2026 Rugby League World Cup.
