= King's Birthday match (NRL) =

Annuial rugby league match in Australia

- Location: Stadium Australia, Sydney
- Teams: Canterbury-Bankstown Bulldogs; Parramatta Eels (2022–present); St. George Illawarra Dragons (2015–2021)
- First meeting: 8 June 2015; Canterbury 29 def. St. George Illawarra 16
- Latest meeting: 9 June 2025; Canterbury 30 def. Parramatta 12
- Next meeting: 8 June 2026
- Broadcasters: Fox League

Statistics
- Most wins: Canterbury-Bankstown Bulldogs; 8 wins
- Largest victory: Canterbury-Bankstown Bulldogs; 30 points (13 June 2022)

The King's Birthday match (from 2015 to 2022, the Queen's Birthday match) is an annual rugby league match held on the King's Birthday Holiday in Australia between the Canterbury-Bankstown Bulldogs and the St. George Illawarra Dragons or Parramatta Eels. It is traditionally played at Stadium Australia. The Canterbury-Bankstown Bulldogs won the first three clashes, but St. George Illawarra won the following two. The Canterbury-Bankstown Bulldogs however won the two following encounters.

The game was the first of two on the holiday when it started, but due to the scrapping of Monday night football it is now the centrepiece event on the King's Birthday Holiday. The match traditionally kicks off at 4pm. The game is the centrepiece of the long weekend's big lineup each year.

In 2020, due to the COVID-19 pandemic, the match was moved to Bankwest Stadium and played behind closed doors.

== Head to head ==
=== Canterbury-Bankstown v St George Illawarra (2015–2021) ===
Team	Played	Games won	Draws	Games lost	Points For	Points Against	Point Difference
Canterbury-Bankstown Bulldogs	7	5	0	2	157	96	+61
St. George Illawarra Dragons	7	2	0	5	96	157	-61

=== Canterbury-Bankstown v Parramatta (since 2022) ===
Team	Played	Games won	Draws	Games lost	Points For	Points Against	Point Difference
Canterbury-Bankstown Bulldogs	3	2	0	1	68	56	+12
Parramatta Eels	3	1	0	2	56	68	–12

== Results summary ==
Year	Home	Score	Away	Venue	Attendance
2015	Canterbury-Bankstown	29 – 16	St. George Illawarra	Stadium Australia	27,291
2016	St. George Illawarra	16 – 34	Canterbury-Bankstown	Stadium Australia	20,153
2017	Canterbury-Bankstown	16 – 2	St. George Illawarra	Stadium Australia	24,083
2018	Canterbury-Bankstown	16 – 18	St. George Illawarra	Stadium Australia	21,376
2019	Canterbury-Bankstown	12 – 36	St. George Illawarra	Stadium Australia	16,003
2020	Canterbury-Bankstown	22 – 2	St. George Illawarra	Western Sydney Stadium	N/A
2021	Canterbury-Bankstown	28 – 6	St. George Illawarra	Stadium Australia	17,382
2022	Canterbury-Bankstown	34 – 4	Parramatta	Stadium Australia	20,184
2023	Canterbury-Bankstown	12 – 34	Parramatta	Stadium Australia	33,866
2024	Canterbury-Bankstown	22 – 18	Parramatta	Stadium Australia	45,496
2025	Canterbury-Bankstown	30 – 12	Parramatta	Stadium Australia	59,878
2026	Canterbury-Bankstown	14 – 12	Parramatta	Stadium Australia	37,638

== Year-by-year results ==
=== 2015 ===
8 June 2015 Round 13	Canterbury	29 – 16	St George Illawarra	Sydney
4:00 PM	Tries: Curtis Rona '7, Josh Morris '20, Tim Lafai '62, Tim Browne '66, Sam Kasiano '76 Goals: Trent Hodkinson '22, '77, Moses Mbye '63, '68.	Report	Tries: Gareth Widdop '32, '46, Peter Mata'utia '57. Goals: Gareth Widdop '34, '47	Stadium: ANZ Stadium; Attendance: 27,291

=== 2016 ===
13 June 2016 Round 14	Canterbury	34 – 16	St George Illawarra	Sydney
4:00 PM	Tries: Sam Perrett '15, Michael Lichaa '29, Moses Mbye '31, Curtis Rona '57, Will Hopoate '60, Josh Reynolds '70. Goals: Kerrod Holland '29, 32', '60, '70	Report	Tries: Kurt Mann '10, '48, Tyson Frizell '37. Goals: Gareth Widdop '11, '38	Stadium: ANZ Stadium; Attendance: 20,153

=== 2017 ===
12 June 2017 Round 14	Canterbury	16 – 2	St George Illawarra	Sydney
4:00 PM	Tries: Josh Morris '54, Michael Lichaa '69, Marcelo Montoya '74 Goals: Moses Mbye '55, '71	Report	Tries: Goals: Gareth Widdop '21	Stadium: ANZ Stadium; Attendance: 24,083

=== 2018 ===
11 June 2018 Round 14	Canterbury	16 – 18	St George Illawarra	Sydney
4:00 PM	Tries: Adam Elliott '17, Will Hopoate '44, Brett Morris 47' Goals: Moses Mbye '18, '48	Report	Tries: Euan Aitken '2, Tariq Sims '8, Nene Macdonald '34 Goals: Gareth Widdop '34, '56, '66	Stadium: ANZ Stadium; Attendance: 21,376

=== 2019 ===
10 June 2019 Round 13	Canterbury	12 – 36	St George Illawarra	Sydney
4:05 PM	Tries: Raymond Faitala-Mariner '2, Kieran Foran '69 Goals: Nick Meaney '3, '70	Report	Tries: Mikaele Ravalawa '9, '72, Corey Norman '13, Jonus Pearson '26, Ben Hunt '53, Zac Lomax '60 Goals: Zac Lomax '10, '15, '28, '55, '61, '74	Stadium: ANZ Stadium; Attendance: 16,003

=== 2020 ===
8 June 2020 Round 4	Canterbury	22 – 2	St George Illawarra	Sydney
4:05 PM	Tries: Adam Elliott 19', Nick Meaney 50', Reimis Smith 70' Goals: Nick Meaney 20', 26', 32', 51', 71'	Report	Tries: Goals: Zac Lomax 3'	Stadium: Bankwest Stadium; Attendance: 0

=== 2021 ===
14 June 2021 Round 14	Canterbury	28 – 6	St. George Illawarra	Sydney
4:00 PM	Tries: Jake Averillo 28', 41', Jeremy Marshall-King 51'. Adam Elliott 68' Goals: Jake Averillo 9', 29', 43', 53', 62', 77'	Report	Tries: Brayden Wiliame 20' Goals: Corey Norman 22'	Stadium: Stadium Australia; Attendance: 17,382

=== 2022 ===
Round 14: 13 June 2022
16:00 AEST (UTC+10:00)

Canterbury-Bankstown Bulldogs	34–4	Parramatta Eels
Tries: Addo-Carr 6', 47', 52'; Averillo 14', 72'; Kiraz 26'; Goals: Burton 16', 28', 48', 54', 73'	Report	Tries: Penisini 67'

Accor Stadium, Sydney
Attendance: 20,184
Referee: Ashley Klein

=== 2023 ===
Round 15: 12 June 2023
16:00 AEST (UTC+10:00)

Canterbury-Bankstown Bulldogs	12–34	Parramatta Eels
Tries: Burton 15'; Perham 58'; Goals: Burton 2/2 16', 59'	Report	Tries: Gutherson 4', 22', 24'; Simonsson 30'; Penisini 50'; Sivo 64'; Goals: Moses 5/6 6', 23', 25', 31', 65'

Accor Stadium, Sydney
Attendance: 33,866
Referee: Liam Kennedy

=== 2024 ===
Round 14: 10 June 2024
16:00 AEST

Canterbury-Bankstown Bulldogs	22–18	Parramatta Eels
Tries: Crichton 12', 67'; Wilson 17', 74'; Goals: Burton 3/4 19', 67', 75'; Sin bin: Mann (yellow card) 55' to 65'	Report	Tries: Talagi 6'; Penisini 33'; Tuilagi 44'; Goals: Moses 3/3 7', 34', 46'

Accor Stadium
Attendance: 45,496
Referee: Peter Gough

=== 2025 ===
Round 14: 9 June 2025
16:05 AEST

Canterbury-Bankstown Bulldogs	30–12	Parramatta Eels
Tries: Burton 7'; Montoya 19'; Kikau 60'; Hayes 68'; Galvin 73'; Goals: Crichton 5/6 8', 21', 50', 69', 74'	Report	Tries: Moses 11'; Walker 35'; Goals: Lomax 2/2 12', 36'

Accor Stadium
Attendance: 59,878
Referee: Gerard Sutton

=== 2026 ===
Round 14: 8 June 2026
16:05 AEST

Canterbury-Bankstown Bulldogs	14–12	Parramatta Eels
Tries: Tupouniua 47'; Crichton 50'; Goals: Crichton 3/3 48', 51', 76'	Report	Tries: Da Silva 59'; Papali'i 61'; Goals: Da Silva 2/2 60', 63'

Accor Stadium
Attendance: 37,638
Referee: Todd Smith

== See also ==
- Rivalries in the National Rugby League
- King's Birthday match (AFL)
- i4Give Foundation
