= Dylan Brown =

New Zealand international rugby league footballer

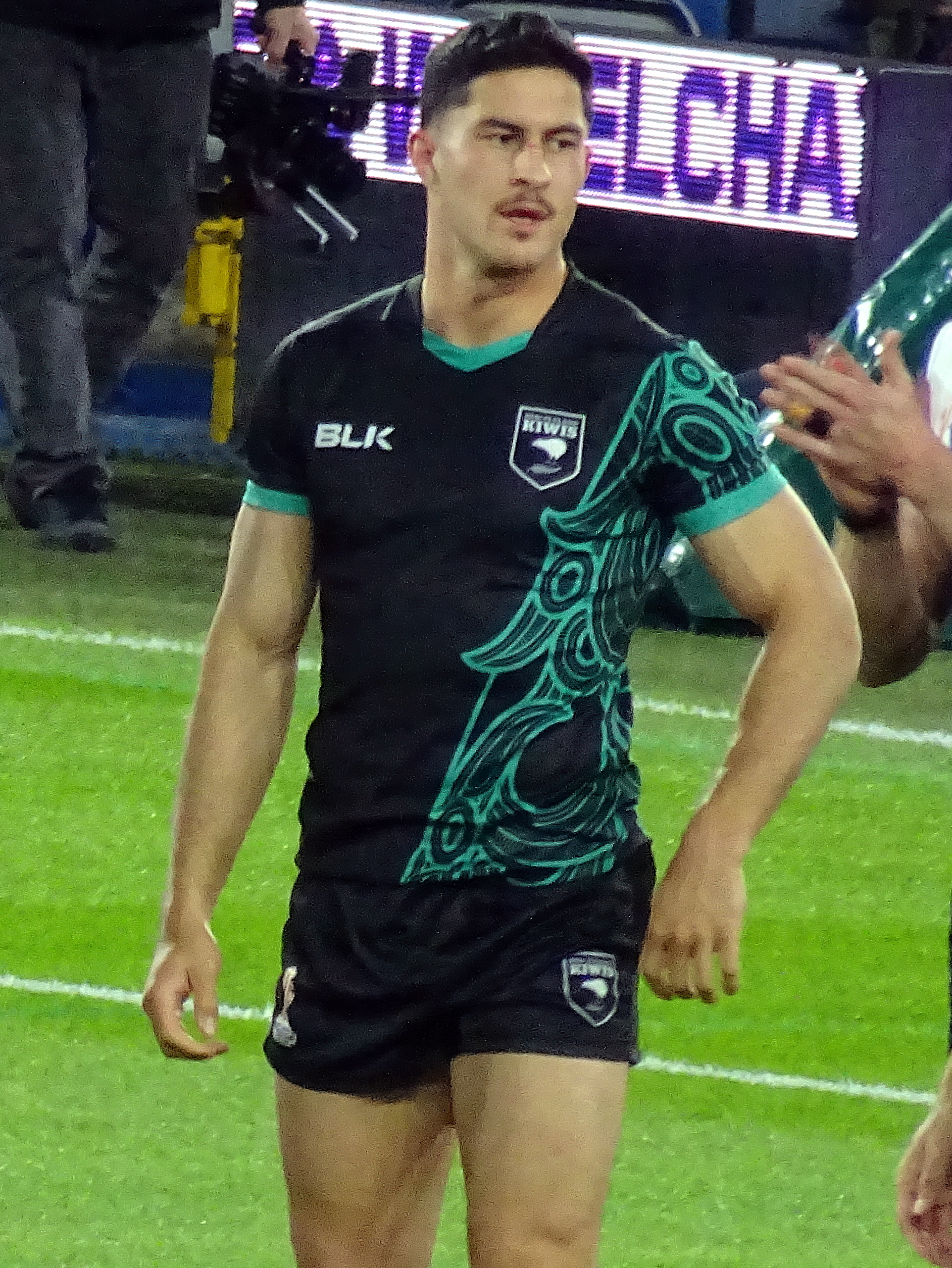

Personal information
- Born: 21 June 2000 (age 26) Auckland, New Zealand
- Height: 183 cm (6 ft 0 in)
- Weight: 89 kg (14 st 0 lb)

Playing information
- Position: Five-eighth, Halfback
Club
Years	Team	Pld	T	G	FG	P
2019–25	Parramatta Eels	142	36	1	0	146
2026–	Newcastle Knights	15	2	0	1	9
	Total	157	38	1	1	155
Representative
Years	Team	Pld	T	G	FG	P
2022–25	New Zealand	11	5	2	0	24
- Source: As of 19 November 2026

Dylan Brown (born 21 June 2000) is a New Zealand professional rugby league footballer who plays as a five-eighth for the Newcastle Knights in the National Rugby League and New Zealand at international level.

== Background ==
Brown was born in Auckland and grew up in Whangarei, New Zealand and is of Samoan and Niuean heritage.

He played his junior rugby league for the Hikurangi Stags.

Aged 15, Brown moved to Sydney, Australia to pursue an NRL career with the Parramatta Eels. He attended and graduated from The Hills Sports High School.

== Early career ==
Brown played for Parramatta's Harold Matthews Cup and S.G ball squad. In 2017 he led the S.G. Ball Squad to the grand final where they were victorious 30–22 over the Cronulla-Sutherland Sharks.

Later on in the year he went on to debut for the Eels in the under 20s Holden cup team in the middle of the 2017 season, at the age of 17. In 2017, Brown led the Holden Cup squad to the NYC Grand Final, losing to the Manly-Warringah Sea Eagles.

Brown was then selected in the Australian Schoolboys later in the year at five-eighth, but withdrew from injury.

== Playing career ==
=== 2018 ===
In 2018, Brown started the year with a Jersey Flegg Cup and training on and off with first grade.

Towards the end of the year he debuted for the Wentworthville Magpies in the NSW Cup, playing five games.

This led him to being promoted to Parramatta's first grade squad for the 2019 NRL season, re-signing with the club until the end of the 2020 NRL season.

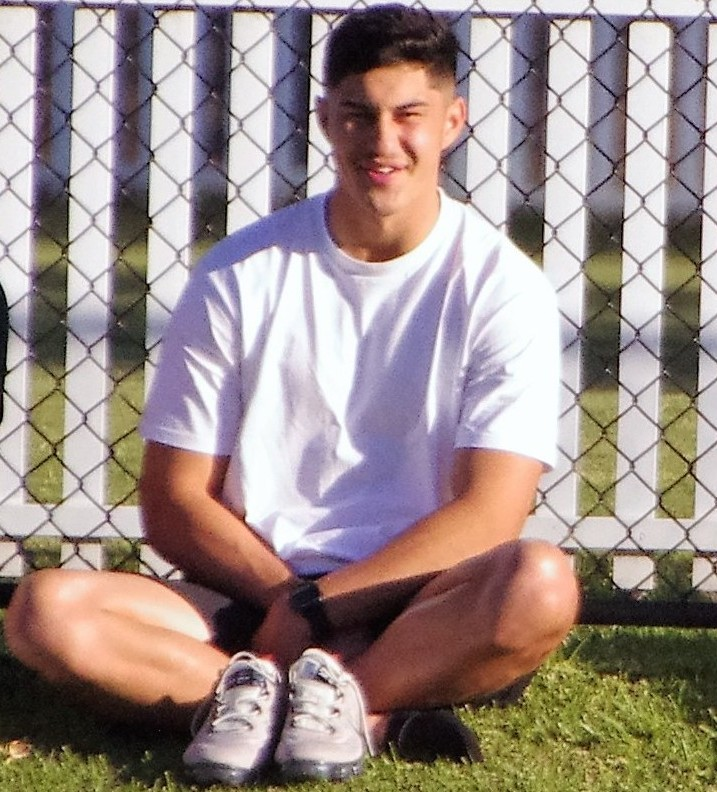
Brown in 2019

=== 2019 ===
In February, the New Zealand Warriors reportedly offered Brown a six-year contract worth $3 million, however Brown turned down the offer to stay with Parramatta.

On 17 March 2019 Brown made his NRL debut in round 1 against the Penrith Panthers in a 20–12 win.

On 24 March 2019 Brown scored his first NRL try in round 2 against the Canterbury-Bankstown Bulldogs in a 36–16 win.

On 2 April 2019, Brown was ruled out indefinitely after sustaining bone bruising on his back. It was reported that Brown had been suffering with the injury for an extended period and would sit out opposed training sessions to protect himself in order to play in matches.

In Round 15 against Canberra Raiders, Brown made his long-awaited return from injury as Parramatta came from 16–0 down to win 22–16 at TIO Stadium in Darwin.

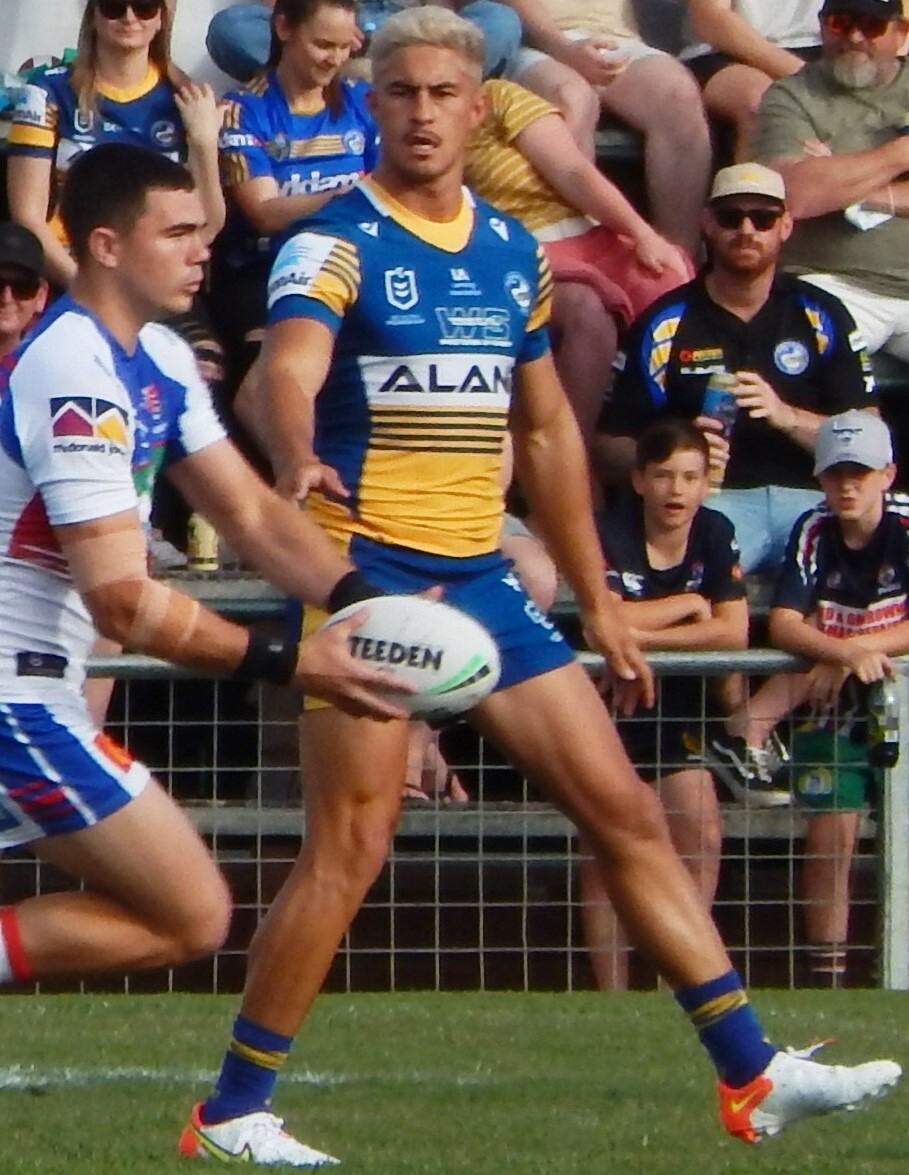
Brown playing for the Eels in 2021

At the end of the 2019 regular season, Parramatta finished fifth on the table and qualified for the finals. In the elimination final against Brisbane, Brown scored two tries as Parramatta won the match 58–0 at the new Western Sydney Stadium. The victory was the biggest finals win in history, eclipsing Newtown's 55–7 win over St George in 1944. The match was also Parramatta's biggest win over Brisbane and, at the time, Brisbane's worst ever loss since entering the competition in 1988.

On 3 December 2019, Brown signed a three-year extension, until 2023, with Parramatta worth $2 million.

=== 2020 ===
In round 16 of the 2020 NRL season, Brown was taken from the field with an ankle injury during Parramatta's 38–0 loss to South Sydney Rabbitohs. It was later revealed that Brown would require surgery on his ankle and would be ruled out indefinitely.

=== 2021 ===
In round 9 of the 2021 NRL season, Brown was placed on report after diving over the top of Sydney Roosters player Drew Hutchison as he was in the act of scoring a try. Hutchison was rushed to hospital during the game with suspected broken ribs and a punctured lung. Brown was later suspended for three weeks over the incident.

Brown made a total of 21 appearances and scored four tries in Parramatta's 2021 NRL season including the club's two finals matches against Newcastle and Penrith.

=== 2022 ===
In round 12 of the 2022 NRL season, Brown scored two tries including the winner in a 28–20 victory over Canberra. He made his international debut for New Zealand against Tonga in June. In round 23, Brown scored two tries for Parramatta in a 42–6 victory over arch-rivals Canterbury. Brown played every game for Parramatta throughout 2022 including the clubs 2022 NRL Grand Final loss to Penrith. In October Brown was named in the New Zealand squad for the 2021 Rugby League World Cup. On 19 December, Brown re-signed with Parramatta until the end of 2025, with options to extend until 2031.

=== 2023 ===
After serving a seven-match suspension which was handed to Brown by the NRL in relation to his sexual touching case, Brown was named to make his return in Parramatta's round 23 match against St. George Illawarra. Brown played a total of 17 matches for Parramatta in the 2023 NRL season as the club finished 10th on the table.

=== 2024 ===
In round 1 of the 2024 NRL season, Brown played his 100th first grade game in Parramatta's 26–8 victory over arch-rivals Canterbury. Brown played a total of 24 games for Parramatta in the 2024 NRL season scoring five tries. The club would finish 15th on the table after a difficult campaign.

=== 2025 ===
Just a week into the start of the new NRL season, it was announced that Brown had signed with the Newcastle Knights on a 10-year deal, rumoured to be worth $13 million, starting in 2026. In round 19 of the 2025 NRL season, Brown was selected at hooker by Parramatta head coach Jason Ryles ahead of their match against Penrith. Midway through the match, Brown was benched and did not return to the field as Parramatta lost 32–10. In the post match press conference Ryles said to the media “It's just our future’s now, so we want to get on with it, And I had a really good conversation with Dylan and he was all on board for it and he's been really receptive of it and obviously the way he played sort of reflected that too and then Joash Papali'i had an opportunity at No.6". Ahead of the clubs round 20 match against Canberra, Brown was demoted from the team and was placed as 18th man. After spending a month in exile from the first team, Brown was recalled to the Parramatta side to play at centre against North Queensland in round 23 which Parramatta won 19–18. In round 27, Brown played his final game for Parramatta which ironically came against his future club Newcastle. Parramatta would win the match 66–10 with Brown scoring a try. The loss for Newcastle meant they finished with the wooden spoon.

He scored a try for New Zealand in the Pacific Championships 24–18 win over Samoa on 18 October 2025.

=== 2026 ===
In round 1 of the 2026 NRL season, Brown made his club debut for Newcastle in their victory over North Queensland. The following week, Brown suffered a MCL injury in Newcastle's win over Manly and was ruled out for a month. Brown played a total of 15 games for the club in 2026 as they made the grand final but lost the Sydney Roosters 19–18. Brown did not feature in the clubs finals campgain or grand final.

== Statistics ==
Year	Team	Games	Tries	Pts
2019	Parramatta Eels	15	5	20
2020	Parramatta Eels	18	4	16
2021	Parramatta Eels	21	4	16
2022	Parramatta Eels	28	11	44
2023	Parramatta Eels	17	3	12
2024	Parramatta Eels	24	5	20
2025	Parramatta Eels	18	4	16
2026	Newcastle Knights	15	2	9
	Totals	157	38	155

== Controversies ==
In June 2023, Brown was charged with sexually touching a woman without consent at a pub in Sydney's eastern suburbs. A statement was later released by the Parramatta club following the allegation.

On 7 June 2023, Brown was stood down by the NRL from playing through their no-fault policy.

On 28 June 2023, Brown pleaded guilty to two counts of sexual touching. He was convicted of touching a woman's breasts without her consent and sentenced to an 18-month Community Corrections Order. On 3 July 2023, Brown was handed a breach notice by the NRL which included him being banned for seven games and fined $40,000, with half suspended.
