= Saxon Pryke =

Australian rugby league footballer

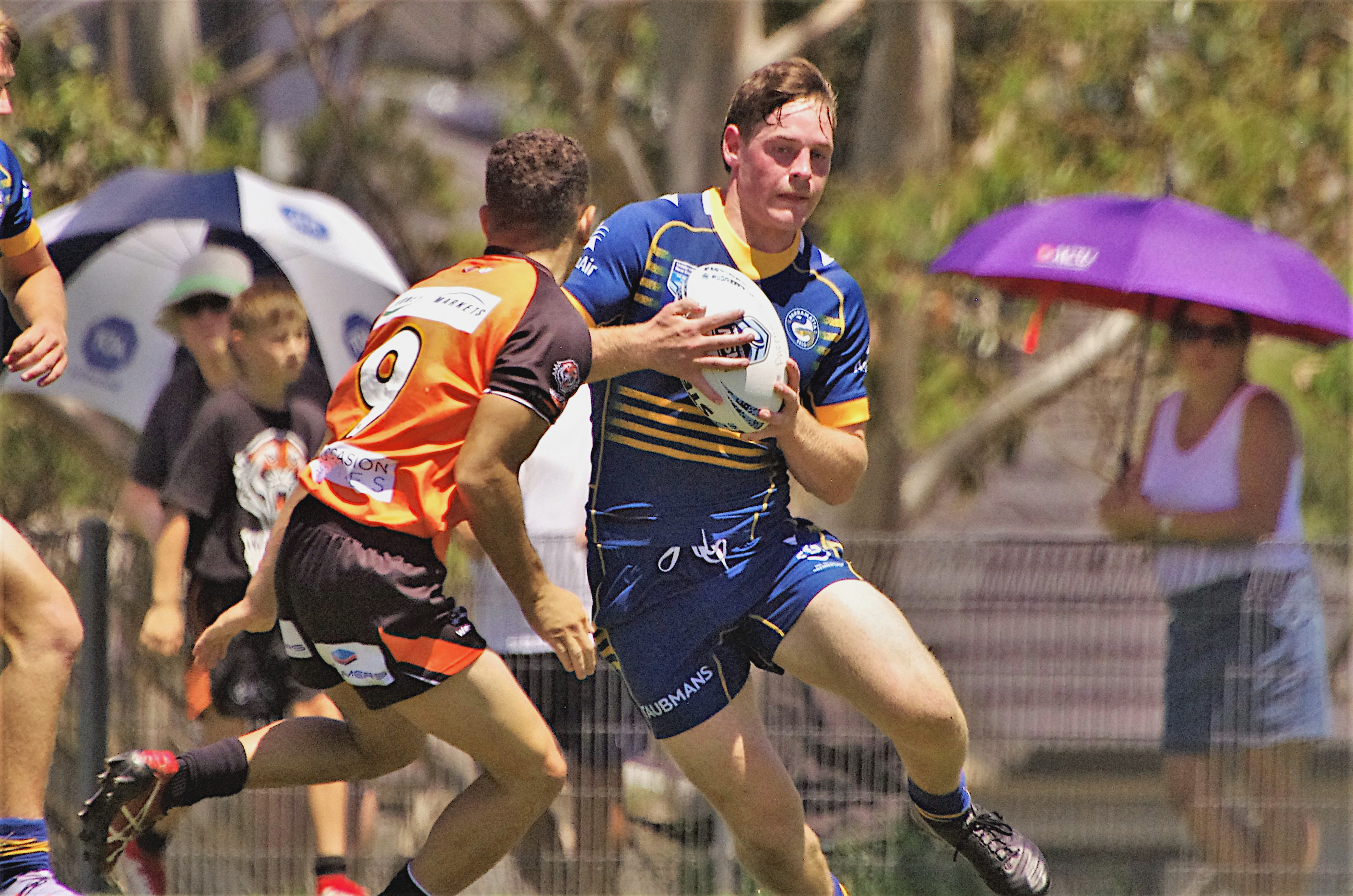

Personal information
- Full name: Saxon Pryke
- Born: 29 January 2004 (age 22) Windsor, New South Wales, Australia
- Height: 183 cm (6 ft 0 in)
- Weight: 100 kg (15 st 10 lb)

Playing information
- Position: Prop, Lock
Club
Years	Team	Pld	T	G	FG	P
2026–	Parramatta Eels	10	0	0	0	0
- Source: As of 10 November 2026

Saxon Pryke (born 29 January 2004) is an Australian professional rugby league footballer who plays as a prop and lock forward for the Parramatta Eels in the National Rugby League and NSW Cup.

== Playing career ==
=== Parramatta Eels ===
Pryke played his junior rugby league for Rouse Hill before making his way through the Parramatta lower grades. In round 7 of the 2026 NRL season, Pryke was named to make his first grade debut due to the clubs high injury toll. Pryke played off the interchange bench as Parramatta upset arch-rivals Canterbury 38-20.
