= Matt Doorey =

Australian rugby league footballer

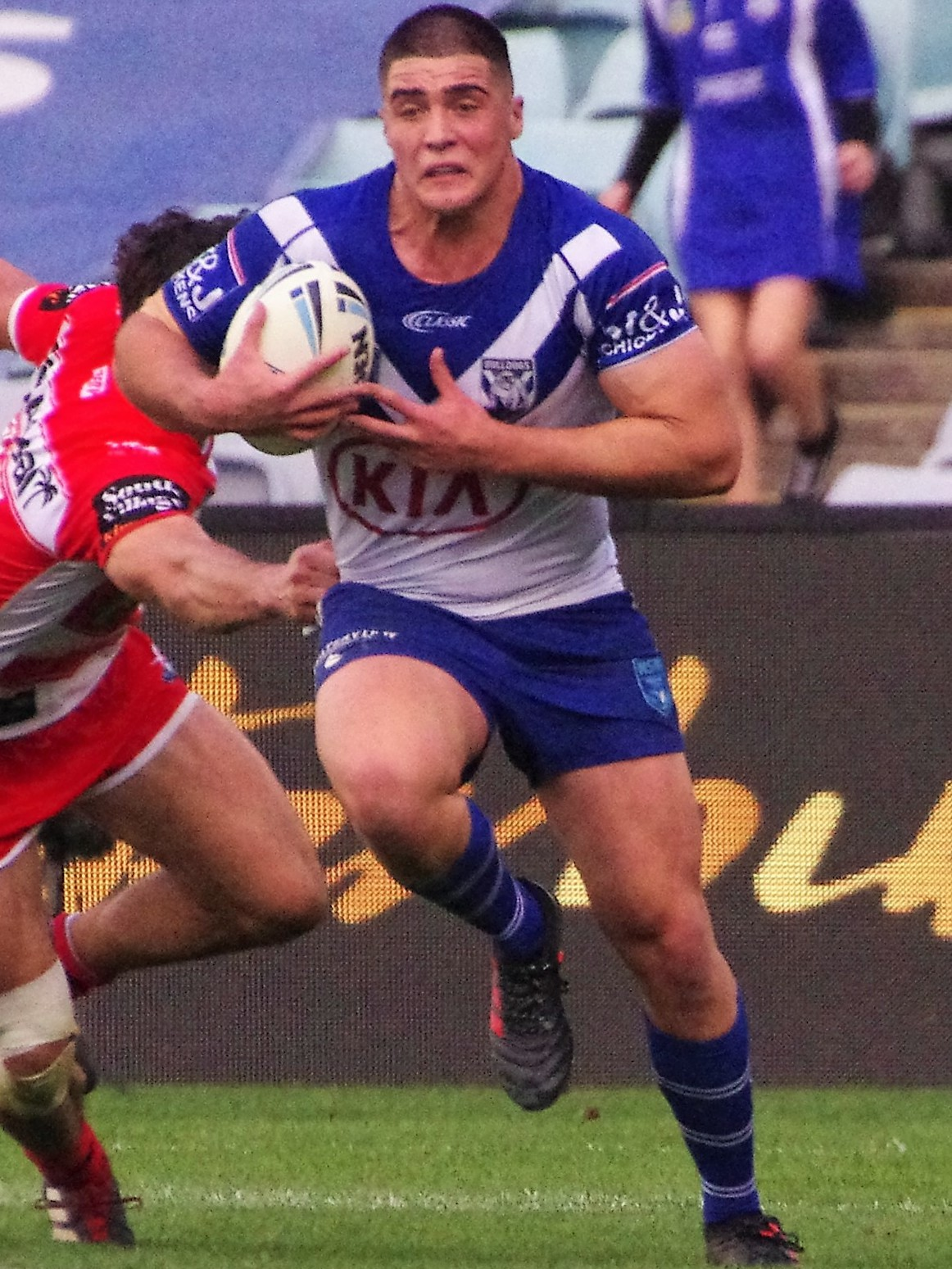

Personal information
- Full name: Matthew Doorey
- Born: 27 June 2000 (age 26) Sydney, New South Wales, Australia
- Height: 185 cm (6 ft 1 in)
- Weight: 101 kg (15 st 13 lb)

Playing information
- Position: Second-row, Lock
Club
Years	Team	Pld	T	G	FG	P
2020–22	Canterbury Bulldogs	18	3	0	0	12
2023–	Parramatta Eels	36	3	0	0	12
	Total	54	6	0	0	24
- Source: As of 28 March 2026

Matthew Doorey (born 27 June 2000) is an Australian professional rugby league footballer who plays as a second-row forward for the Parramatta Eels in the National Rugby League. He previously played for the Canterbury-Bankstown Bulldogs.

== Career ==
=== 2020 ===
Doorey made his first grade debut in round 14 of the 2020 NRL season for Canterbury-Bankstown against the Wests Tigers, scoring a try on debut in a 29–28 loss at Bankwest Stadium.

=== 2021 ===
Doorey made a total of 13 appearances for Canterbury in the 2021 NRL season as the club finished last and claimed the wooden spoon.

=== 2022 ===
Doorey made no appearances for Canterbury in the 2022 NRL season. On 25 September, Doorey played for Canterbury's NSW Cup team in their grand final loss to Penrith. On 11 November, Doorey signed a two-year deal to join Canterbury's arch-rivals Parramatta starting in 2023.

=== 2023 ===
Doorey made his club debut for Parramatta in round 1 of the 2023 NRL season against Melbourne. Parramatta would lose 16-12 in golden point extra-time. In round 3 against Manly, Doorey scored his first try for the club in Parramatta's 34-30 loss at Brookvale Oval. Doorey played a total of eleven matches for Parramatta in the 2023 NRL season as the club finished 10th on the table.

=== 2024 ===
Doorey started the 2024 season for Parramatta's reserve grade team, in good form. On 4 April, it was announced that Doorey would miss at least five weeks with a facial fracture, he returned in Round 7. Doorey was limited to only four matches with Parramatta in the 2024 NRL season as the club finished 15th on the table.

=== 2025 ===
Doorey played 17 matches for Parramatta in the 2025 NRL season as the club finished 11th on the table. On 30 October, Parramatta announced that Doorey had re-signed with the club for a further two years.

=== 2026 ===
In round 4 of the 2026 NRL season, Doorey was taken from the field during Parramatta's loss against Penrith in the Western Sydney Derby. It was later revealed he had suffered an ACL injury and would miss the rest of the season.

== Statistics ==
Year	Team	Games	Tries	Pts
2020	Canterbury-Bankstown Bulldogs	5	2	8
2021	Canterbury-Bankstown Bulldogs	13	1	4
2023	Parramatta Eels	11	1	4
2024	Parramatta Eels	4		
2025	Parramatta Eels	17	2	8
2026	Parramatta Eels	4		
	Totals	54	6	24
