= Sam Tuivaiti =

New Zealand rugby league footballer

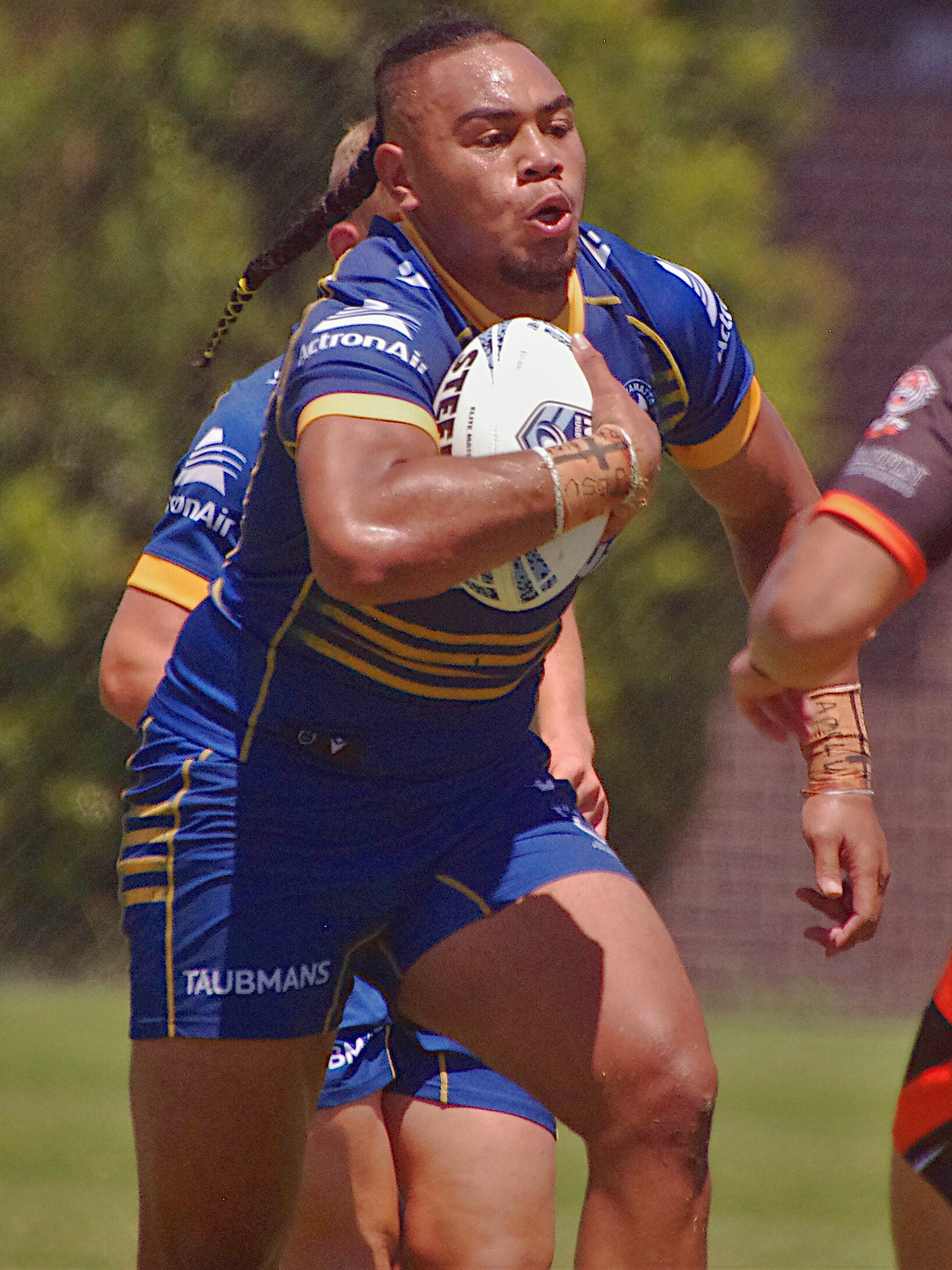

Personal information
- Full name: Sam Tuivaiti
- Born: 17 February 2005 (age 21) New Zealand
- Height: 193 cm (6 ft 4 in)
- Weight: 116 kg (18 st 4 lb)

Playing information
- Position: Prop
Club
Years	Team	Pld	T	G	FG	P
2025–	Parramatta Eels	25	1	0	0	4
- Source: As of 8 August 2026

Sam Tuivaiti (born 17 February 2005) is a New Zealand professional rugby league footballer who plays as a prop forward for the Parramatta Eels in the National Rugby League and NSW Cup.

== Playing career ==
Tuivaiti played his junior rugby league for the Canley Vale Kookaburras. He was then spotted by Parramatta and played in their SG Ball and Under 21's teams. In 2022, he represented the Australian schoolboys and played for the junior New South Wales team. In round 1 of the 2025 NRL season, Tuivaiti made his first grade debut for Parramatta in their 56-18 loss against Melbourne at AAMI Park. In round 9, he suffered a syndesmosis injury during Parramatta's loss to Cronulla and was ruled out for an unspecified period. Tuivaiti made his return to the Parramatta side in their round 19 loss against Penrith.

On 5 August 2025, it was announced that Tuivaiti would miss the rest of the 2025 NRL season after suffering a grade two medial ligament injury.

Tuivaiti played 14 matches for Parramatta in the 2026 NRL season. Following the clubs round 23 loss against South Sydney, it was announced he had suffered a season ending injury.

On 23 October 2026, the Eels announced that Tuivaiti had re-signed with the club until the end of 2030.

== Statistics ==
Year	Team	Games	Tries	Pts
2025	Parramatta Eels	11	1	4
2026	Parramatta Eels	14		
	Totals	25	1	4
