= Ronald Volkman =

Samoa international rugby league footballer

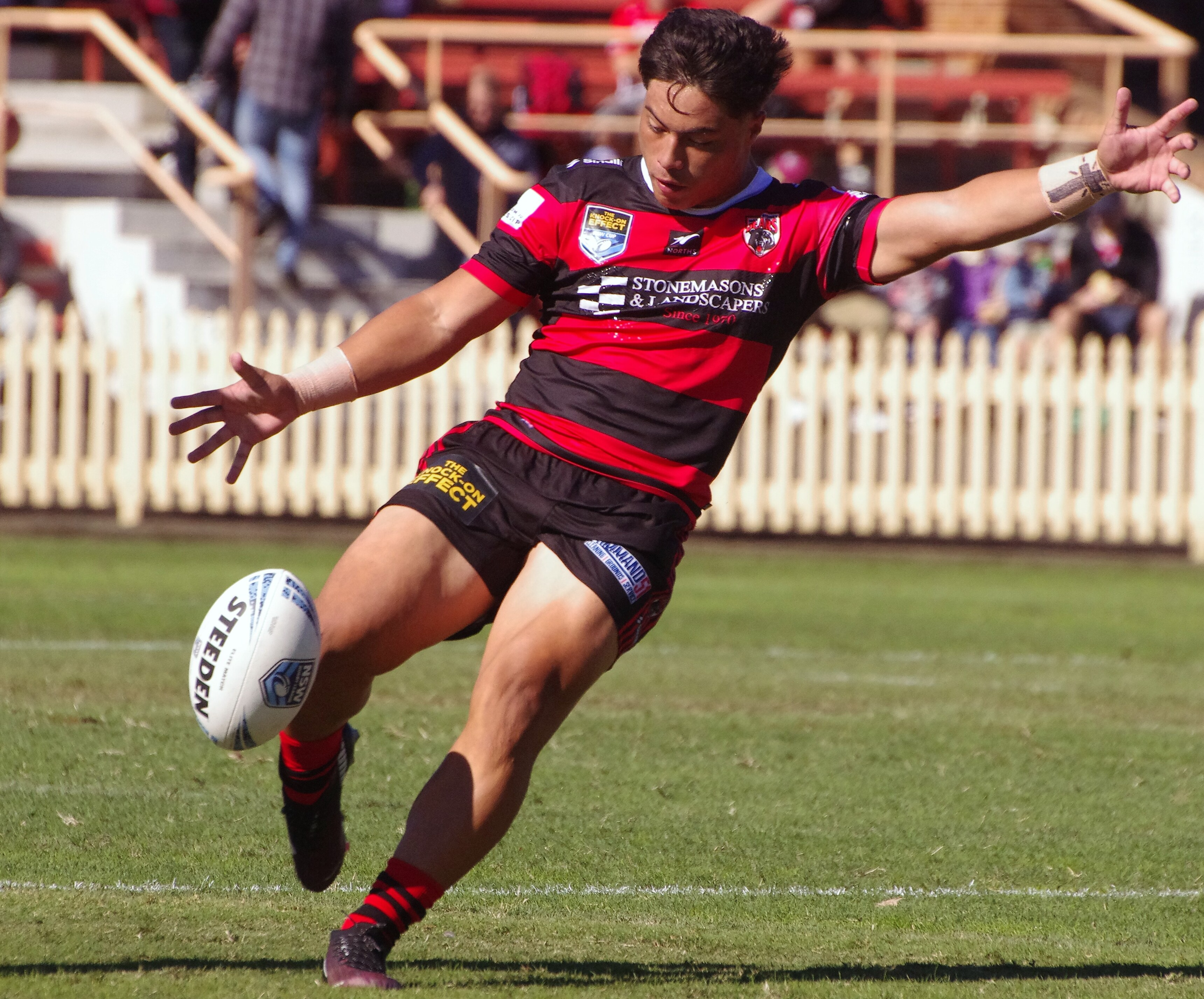

Personal information
- Full name: Ronald Volkman
- Born: 4 July 2002 (age 24) Sydney, New South Wales, Australia
- Height: 179 cm (5 ft 10 in)
- Weight: 91 kg (14 st 5 lb)

Playing information
- Position: Five-eighth, Halfback
Club
Years	Team	Pld	T	G	FG	P
2022–23	New Zealand Warriors	5	1	0	0	4
2025–	Parramatta Eels	21	8	3	1	39
	Total	26	9	3	1	43
Representative
Years	Team	Pld	T	G	FG	P
2023–	Samoa	4	2	4	0	16
- Source: As of 17 November 2026

Ronald Volkman (born 4 July 2002) is a Samoa international rugby league footballer who plays as a five-eighth for the Parramatta Eels in the National Rugby League (NRL).

== Background ==
Volkman was born in Sydney, Australia. He went to Waverley College where he played rugby union. He is of Samoan and German descent.

== Playing career ==
Volkman is a Cabramatta Rugby Leagues junior, and signed with the Sydney Roosters in 2021. Volkman also played in the NSW Cup for the North Sydney Bears. In May 2022, he was released mid season by the Roosters and signed with the New Zealand Warriors on a three-year deal. Volkman made his first grade debut in round 15 of the 2022 NRL season in his side's 40–6 loss to the Penrith Panthers at Dolphin Stadium. In December 2023, Volkman was granted a release from his contract with the Warriors.

=== 2024 ===
On 4 January 2024, Volkman signed a one-year deal to join St. George Illawarra, but failed a routine medical exam due to a shoulder injury that required surgery before the contract could be registered with the NRL. It was later announced that the Warriors would pay for Volkman's surgery and rehab. On 24 September 2024, it was announced that the Dragons had been issued a breach notice over the saga and were fined $40,000. On 5 December, the Eels announced that Volkman had signed a deal to join the team after he had passed a medical on his shoulder.

=== 2025 ===
Volkman made his club debut for Parramatta in round 1 of the 2025 NRL season against Melbourne which saw the side lose 56-18. Following two lacklustre performances at halfback to start the year, Volkman was demoted to the NSW Cup by head coach Jason Ryles ahead of Parramatta's round 3 match against Canterbury.

On 21 May, Parramatta announced that Volkman signed a one-year extension.

=== 2026 ===
On 2 September 2026, Parramatta announced Volkman had re-signed for a further two years. Volkman played 19 matches for Parramatta in the 2026 NRL season and was considered by many critics to be one of the team’s best performers despite the club finishing 13th on the table.

== Statistics ==
Year	Team	Games	Tries	Goals	FG	Pts
2022	New Zealand Warriors	2				
2023	New Zealand Warriors	3	1			4
2025	Parramatta Eels	2				
2026	Parramatta Eels	19	8	3	1	39
2027	Parramatta Eels					
	Totals	26	9	3	1	43
