= Jack Gibson Cup =

- Sport: Rugby league
- Inaugural season: 2008
- Number of teams: 2
- Country: Australia (National Rugby League)
- Cup holders: Parramatta Eels (2025)
- Most titles: Sydney Roosters (10 titles)

The Jack Gibson Cup is a rugby league match contested annually in the National Rugby League between the Parramatta Eels and the Sydney Roosters. The Jack Gibson Cup was introduced in 2008 to commemorate Jack Gibson after his death in the same year. In the inaugural season it was reported that the winner would be determined by the aggregate scores between the teams over their regular season matches. In the 2014 season, this led to a dispute between the teams after Parramatta won the second match 14–12 and received the trophy despite the aggregate score being 68–18 in favour of Sydney.

== Results ==
Season	Winner	Score	Venue	Attendance	Ref.
2008	Parramatta Eels	28–24	Sydney Football Stadium	12,468	
2009	Sydney Roosters	24–6	Sydney Football Stadium	11,231	
2010	Sydney Roosters	48–12	Parramatta Stadium	19,824	
2011	Sydney Roosters	13–12	Parramatta Stadium	12,097	
2012	Parramatta Eels	36–22	Parramatta Stadium	12,193	
2013	Sydney Roosters	38–24	Parramatta Stadium	12,135	
2014	Parramatta Eels	14–12	Parramatta Stadium	15,312	
2015	Sydney Roosters	28–18	Sydney Football Stadium	11,255	
2016	Parramatta Eels	22–18	Parramatta Stadium	8,464	
2017	Sydney Roosters	48–10	Sydney Football Stadium	10,467	
2018	Sydney Roosters	44–10	Stadium Australia	10,467	
2019	Sydney Roosters	32–18	Stadium Australia	13,367	
2022	Parramatta Eels	26–16	Western Sydney Stadium	21,757	
2023	Sydney Roosters	12–34	Western Sydney Stadium	20,076	
2024	Sydney Roosters	38–14	Sydney Football Stadium	20,724	
2025	Parramatta Eels	30–10	Western Sydney Stadium	19,741	

== Chad Robinson medal ==
The man of the match is awarded the Chad Robinson medal, named after the former Parramatta and Sydney player who died in 2016. It was first awarded in 2018.

Season	Recipient
2018	Latrell Mitchell
2019	James Tedesco
2022	Junior Paulo
2023	Lindsay Collins
2024	James Tedesco
2025	Mitchell Moses
2026	Daniel Tupou

== See also ==
- Parramatta Eels
- Sydney Roosters
