= Isaiah Iongi =

Tonga international rugby league footballer

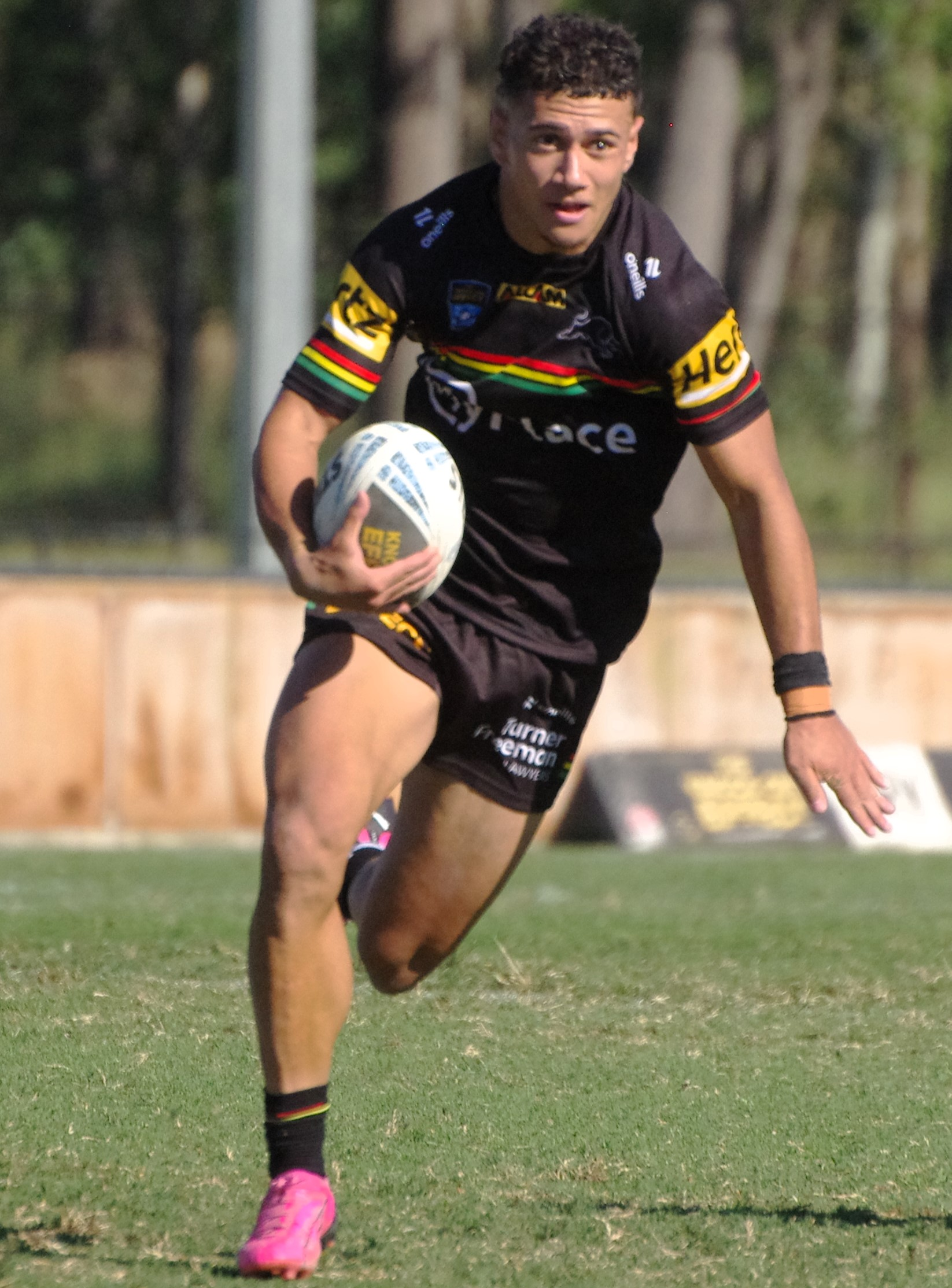

Personal information
- Full name: Isaiah Iongi
- Born: 24 June 2003 (age 23) Herston, Queensland, Australia
- Height: 180 cm (5 ft 11 in)
- Weight: 86 kg (13 st 8 lb)

Playing information
- Position: Fullback
Club
Years	Team	Pld	T	G	FG	P
2024	Penrith Panthers	1	0	0	0	0
2025–	Parramatta Eels	34	13	0	0	52
	Total	35	13	0	0	52
Representative
Years	Team	Pld	T	G	FG	P
2025	Tonga	2	0	0	0	0
- Source: As of 6 November 2026

Isaiah Iongi (born 24 June 2003) is an Tonga international rugby league footballer who plays as a fullback for the Parramatta Eels in the National Rugby League.

== Background ==
Iongi is of Tongan and Cypriot descent. His junior club was Aspley Devils in Brisbane. In 2023, he represented Tonga A team, playing five-eighth. Iongi came through the Penrith Panthers pathway system. In 2022, Iongi made his debut in NSW Cup for Penrith. In 2022, Iongi was selected at Fullback for Queensland under 19's team. In 2023, he was named NSW Cup Fullback of the year

== Playing career ==
In Round 22 2024, Iongi made his NRL debut for Penrith against the Newcastle Knights in a 22–14 win at BlueBet Stadium. Iongi was released from the final year of his deal at Penrith to sign with the Parramatta Eels until the end of 2027. Iongi made his club debut for Parramatta in round 1 of the 2025 NRL season against Melbourne which saw the side lose 56-18. In round 7 of the 2025 NRL season, Iongi scored two tries and was also sin binned during Parramatta's 38-22 victory. On 22 July 2025, it was announced that Iongi would miss at least four weeks after he suffered a broken hand in the clubs round 20 loss against Canberra. Iongi played 21 games for Parramatta in the 2025 NRL season as the club finished 11th on the table.

On 10 December 2025, the Eels announced that Iongi inked a long term extension until the end of 2030.

In round 4 of the 2026 NRL season, Iongi was taken from the field during Parramatta's loss against Penrith in the Western Sydney Derby. It was later revealed he had suffered a syndesmosis injury and would be ruled out for a minimum of eight weeks. Iongi returned to the Parramatta team for their round 13 match against Newcastle. Iongi was limited to 13 matches for Parramatta in the 2026 NRL season as the club finished 13th on the table.

== Controversy ==
On 24 February 2026, images emerged online of Iongi smoking a substance. In the first image, Iongi appears to be holding a pre-rolled paper in one hand while there is an unknown substance in what looks to be a blue herb grinder on the table. In another image published, Iongi appears to be in a bathtub about to light a rolled cigarette. The Parramatta club released a statement which read "The club is aware of social media images circulating that involve one of its players, the club has notified the NRL Integrity Unit and will not be making any further comment at this stage.
