= Kitione Kautoga =

Fiji international rugby league footballer

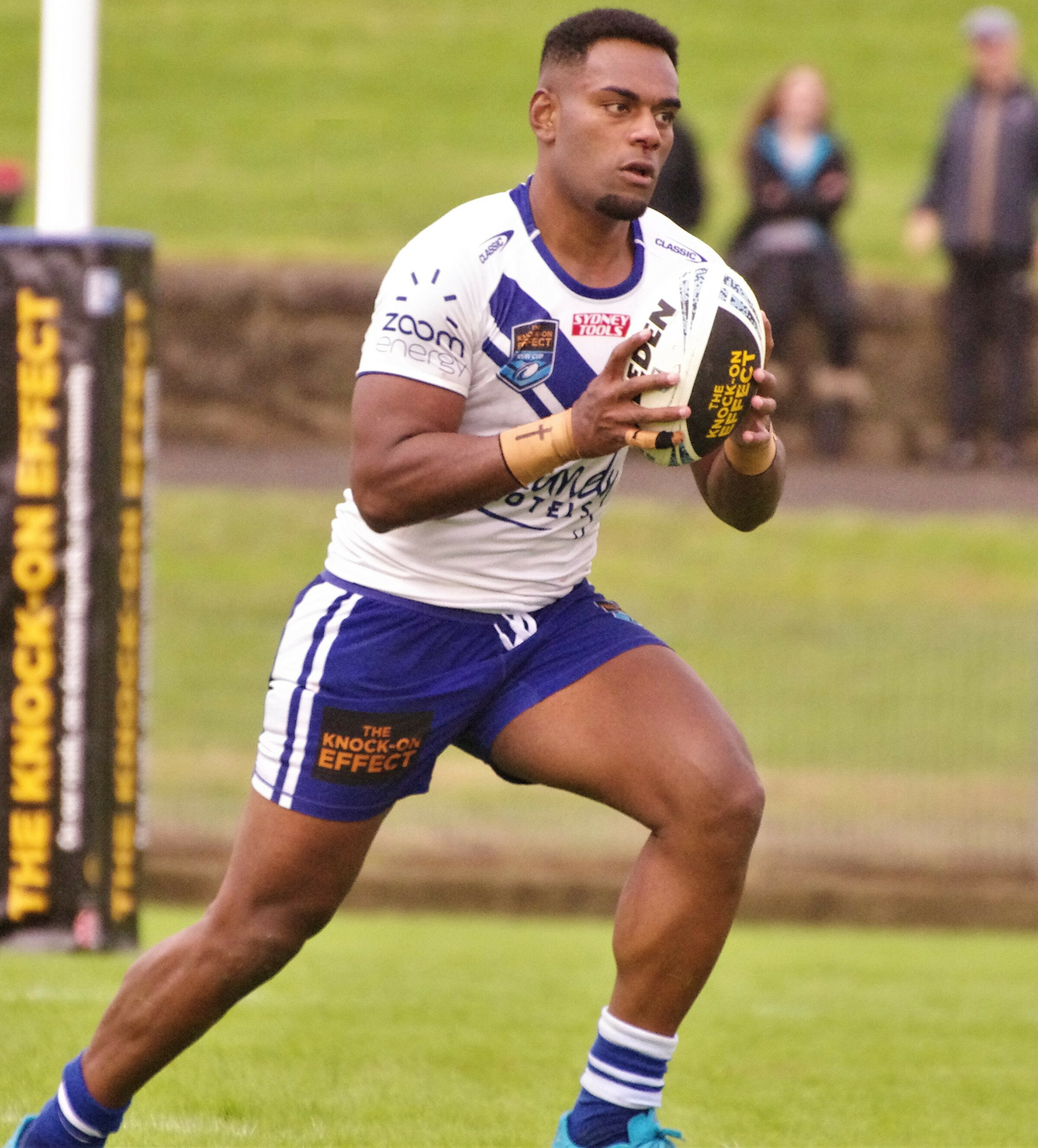

Personal information
- Full name: Kitione Kautoga
- Born: 2 September 2002 (age 24) Fiji
- Height: 185 cm (6 ft 1 in)
- Weight: 104 kg (16 st 5 lb)

Playing information
- Position: Second-row
Club
Years	Team	Pld	T	G	FG	P
2022	Wests Tigers	1	0	0	0	0
2024	Canterbury Bulldogs	2	0	0	0	0
2025–	Parramatta Eels	34	4	0	0	16
	Total	37	4	0	0	16
Representative
Years	Team	Pld	T	G	FG	P
2023–	Fiji	9	5	0	0	20
- Source: As of 6 November 2026

Kitione Kautoga (born 2 September 2002) is a Fijian professional rugby league footballer who plays as a second-row forward for the Parramatta Eels in the National Rugby League and Fiji at international level.

He previously played for the Wests Tigers and Canterbury-Bankstown Bulldogs.

== Playing career ==
He made his debut in round 24 of the 2022 NRL season for the Tigers, debuting from the bench against the St. George Illawarra Dragons. In 2024, he joined Canterbury. Kautoga made his club debut for Canterbury in round 5 of the 2024 NRL season against the Sydney Roosters. Kautoga played one further game for the club in the following round against Melbourne. On 13 December 2024, he signed a contract to join Canterbury's arch-rivals Parramatta ahead of the 2025 NRL season.

=== 2025 ===
Kautoga made his club debut for Parramatta in round 2 of the 2025 NRL season against the Wests Tigers which ended in a 32–6 loss. On 27 June, the Eels announced that Kautoga was elevated into the teams Top 30 squad and had re-signed with the team until the end of 2027. On 15 July, it was announced that Kautoga would miss the rest of the 2025 NRL season after suffering a syndesmosis injury during the clubs round 19 loss against Penrith.

=== 2026 ===
In round 6 of the 2026 NRL season, Kautoga was taken from the field during Parramatta's embarrassing 52–10 loss against the Gold Coast. It was later revealed that he had suffered an MCL injury and would miss six weeks. Kautoga played 19 games for Parramatta in the 2026 NRL season as the club finished 13th on the table.

== See also ==
- Rugby league in Fiji
