= Jordan Samrani =

Lebanon international rugby league footballer

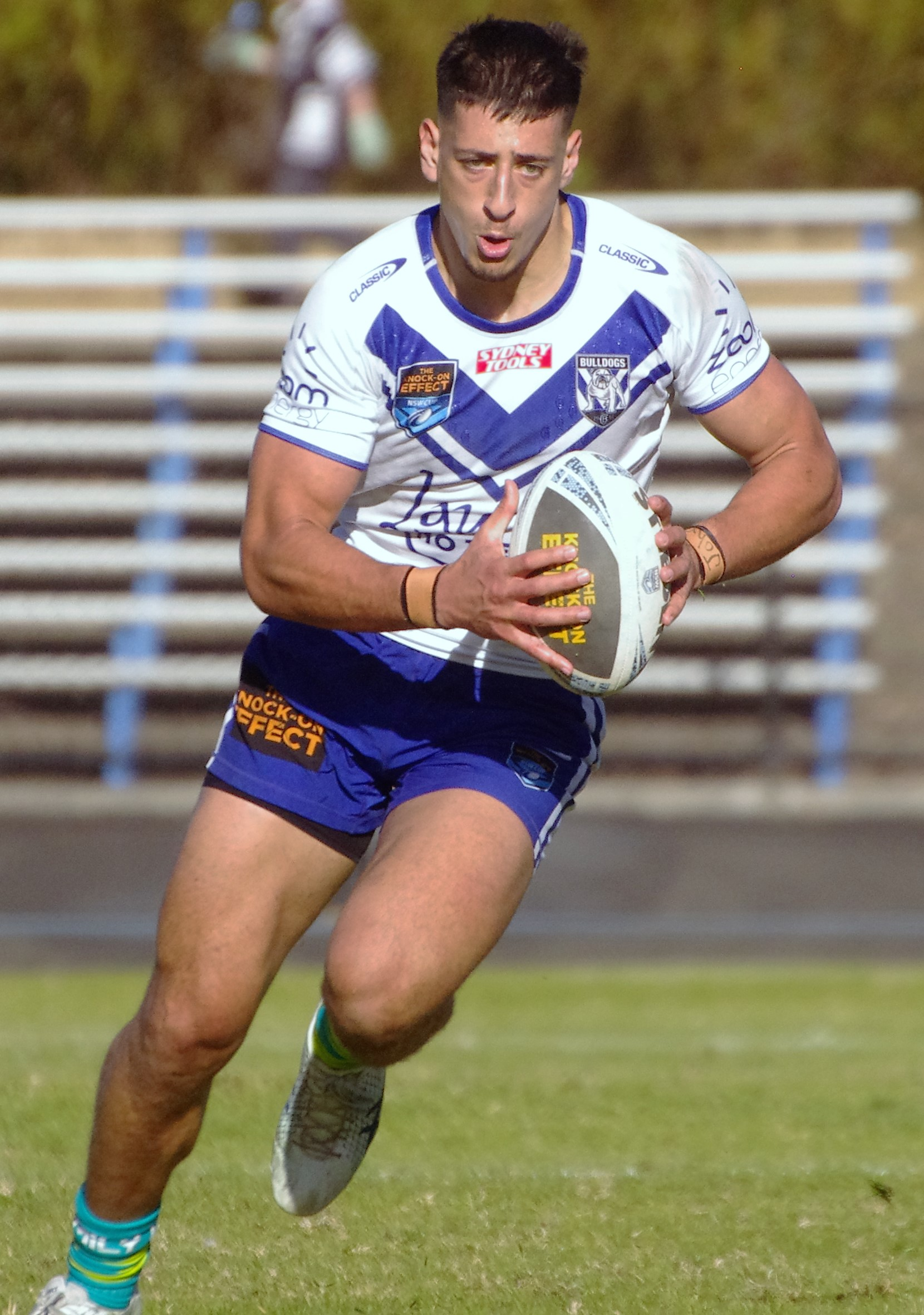

Personal information
- Full name: Jordan Samrani
- Born: 29 January 2002 (age 24) Kogarah, New South Wales, Australia
- Height: 191 cm (6 ft 3 in)
- Weight: 104 kg (16 st 5 lb)

Playing information
- Position: Centre, Wing, Second-row
Club
Years	Team	Pld	T	G	FG	P
2025–	Parramatta Eels	28	12	0	0	48
Representative
Years	Team	Pld	T	G	FG	P
2026–	Lebanon	3	0	0	0	0
- Source: As of 20 November 2026

Jordan Samrani (born 29 January 2002) is a Lebanon international rugby league footballer who plays as a centre and a winger for the Parramatta Eels in the National Rugby League and NSW Cup.

== Early career ==
Samrani played SG Ball and Harold Matthews Cup with Cronulla. In 2019, Samrani was selected for the New South Wales Rugby League Future Blues squad.

== Playing career ==
=== 2025 ===
In 2023, Samrani joined Canterbury. He played two seasons for the club in the NSW Cup. In round 2 of the 2025 NRL season, Samrani made his first grade debut for Parramatta against the Wests Tigers which ended in a 32-6 loss. Samrani played 13 games for Parramatta in the 2025 NRL season as the club finished 11th on the table.

=== 2026 ===
Samrani played 15 matches for Parramatta in the 2026 NRL season as the club finished 13th on the table.

He made his Lebanon international début in the 2026 Rugby League World Cup 42-18 defeat to Papua New Guinea on 17 October 2026.

== Statistics ==
Year	Team	Games	Tries	Pts
2025	Parramatta Eels	13	4	16
2026	Parramatta Eels	15	8	32
2027	Parramatta Eels			
	Totals	28	12	48
