= Charlie Guymer =

Australian rugby league player

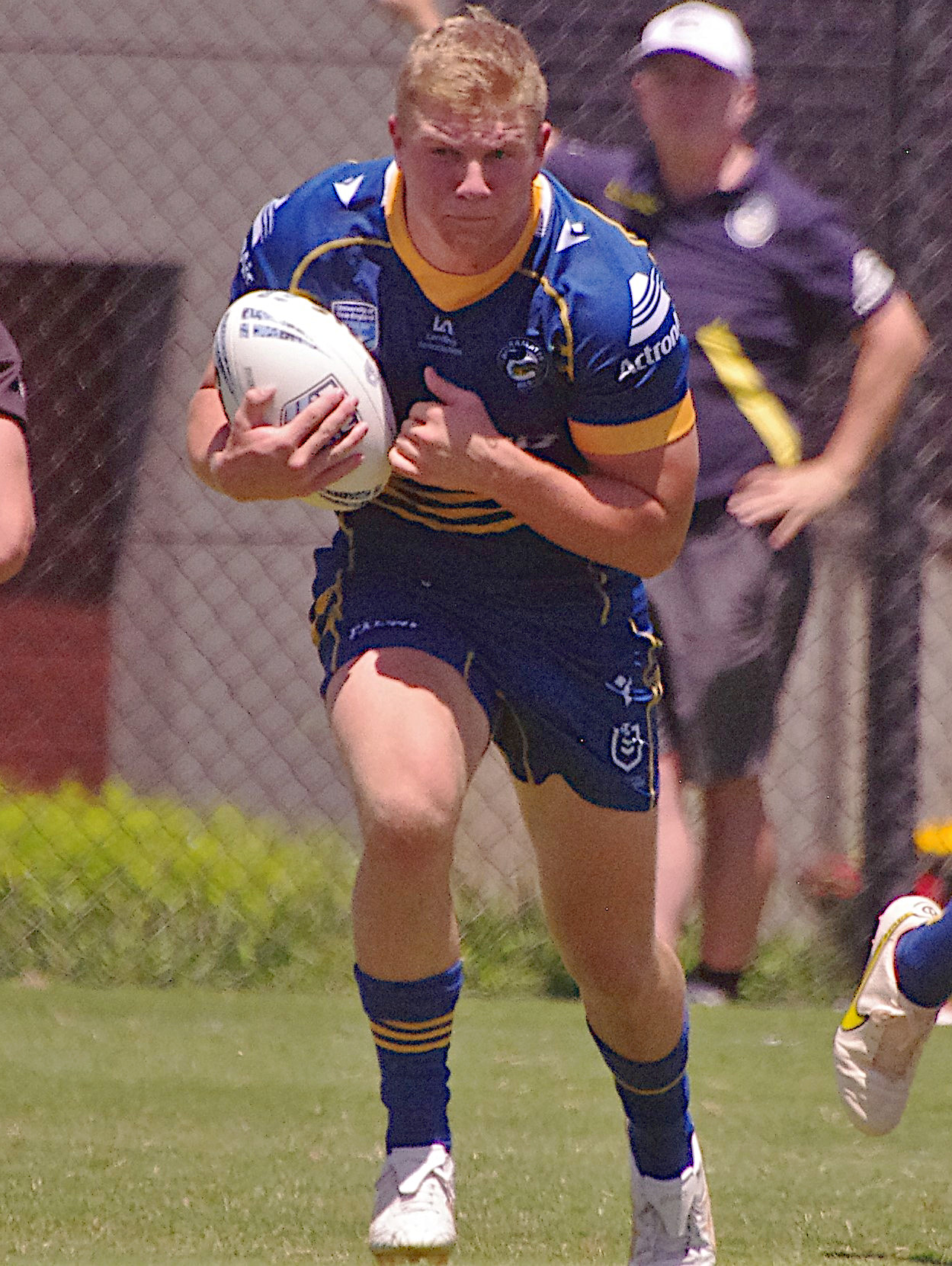

Personal information
- Full name: Charlie Guymer
- Born: 22 November 2004 (age 21) Temora, New South Wales, Australia
- Height: 182 cm (6 ft 0 in)
- Weight: 98 kg (15 st 6 lb)

Playing information
- Position: Second-row, Lock
Club
Years	Team	Pld	T	G	FG	P
2024–	Parramatta Eels	26	3	0	0	12
- Source: As of 15 November 2026

Charlie Guymer (born 12 November 2004) is an Australian professional rugby league footballer who plays as a second-row and a lock forward for the Parramatta Eels in the National Rugby League and NSW Cup.

== Background ==
Guymer grew up in Temora, New South Wales. He played for the Temora Dragons before attending St. Gregory's College, Campbelltown. Guymer was scouted by Parramatta playing Harold Matthews as a Centre. Guymer moved in the back-row in 2023, he was named captain of the Eels SG Ball team, scoring a try in the 2023 GF.

== Playing career ==
In 2023, Guymer debuted for Parramatta's NSW Cup team playing three games. Guymer was selected to represent NSW under 19's Origin team in 2023. In 2024, Guymer became a consistent member in the NSW cup team. In round 18 of the 2024 NRL season, Guymer made his NRL debut for Parramatta against the South Sydney Rabbitohs at Commbank Stadium in a 32-16 loss. On 23 July 2024, it was announced that Guymer would miss the rest of the season with a syndesmosis injury. Guymer played 16 matches for Parramatta in the 2025 NRL season as the club finished 11th on the table.

=== 2026 ===
On 3 April, Parramatta announced that Guymer had re-signed with the club until the end of 2028. Guymer was limited to just eight games for Parramatta in the 2026 NRL season as the club finished 13th on the table.

== Statistics ==
Year	Team	Games	Tries	Pts
2024	Parramatta Eels	2		
2025	Parramatta Eels	16	3	12
2026	Parramatta Eels	2		
2027	Parramatta Eels			
	Totals	20	3	12
