= Ryley Smith =

Australian rugby league footballer

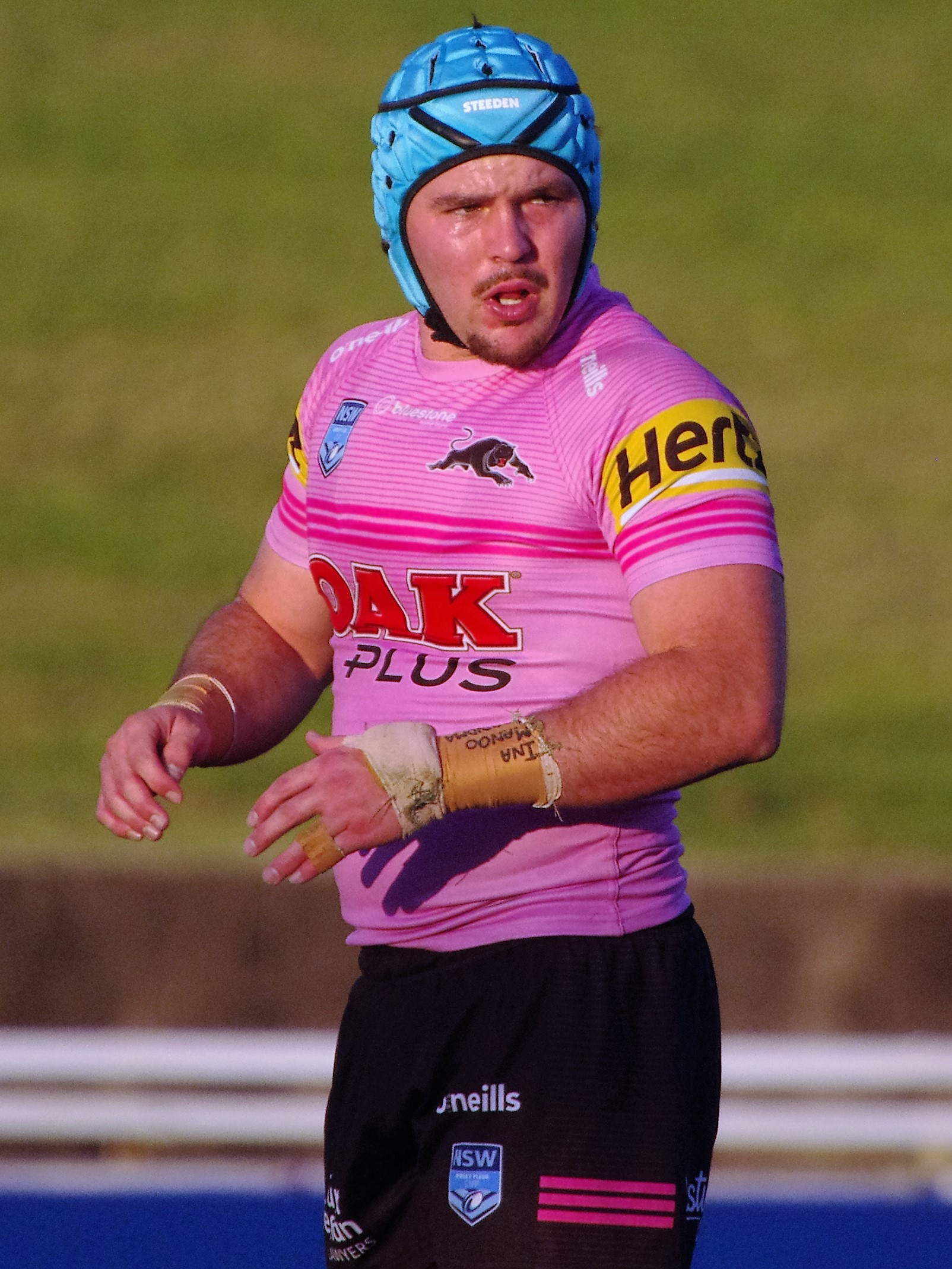

Personal information
- Full name: Ryley Smith
- Born: 21 February 2003 (age 23) Penrith, Australia
- Height: 175 cm (5 ft 9 in)
- Weight: 85 kg (13 st 5 lb)

Playing information
- Position: Hooker
Club
Years	Team	Pld	T	G	FG	P
2025–	Parramatta Eels	32	3	1	0	14
Representative
Years	Team	Pld	T	G	FG	P
2023	Malta	2	1	0	0	4
- Source: As of 8 August 2026

Ryley Smith (born 21 February 2003) is a Malta international rugby league footballer who plays as a hooker for the Parramatta Eels in the National Rugby League.

== Background ==
Smith was selected for the Australian Schoolboys teams in both rugby league and cricket. Being the first player since the 1980's to be selected in two Schoolboys teams for different sports. Smith played for the Penrith Panthers Harold Matts and SG Ball squads before signing with Parramatta in 2024. He is of Maltese descent

== Playing career ==
In round 1 of the 2025 NRL season, Smith made his NRL debut against the Melbourne Storm coming off the bench in a 56–18 loss at AAMI Park. On 1 March 2025, Smith re-signed with Parramatta until the end of 2026. On 1 July 2025, the Parramatta outfit announced that Smith had been upgraded into the clubs Top 30 for the 2026 season and signed on for a further year. Smith played 22 games for Parramatta in the 2025 NRL season as the club finished 11th on the table. In round 9 of the 2026 NRL season, Smith was taken from the field during the clubs loss against the New Zealand Warriors. It was later revealed that Smith had suffered a sternum injury and would be ruled out for an indefinite period.

== Statistics ==
Year	Team	Games	Tries	Goals	Pts
2025	Parramatta Eels	22	1	1	6
2026	Parramatta Eels	10	2		8
	Totals	32	3	1	14
