= Joash Papali'i =

Australian rugby league footballer

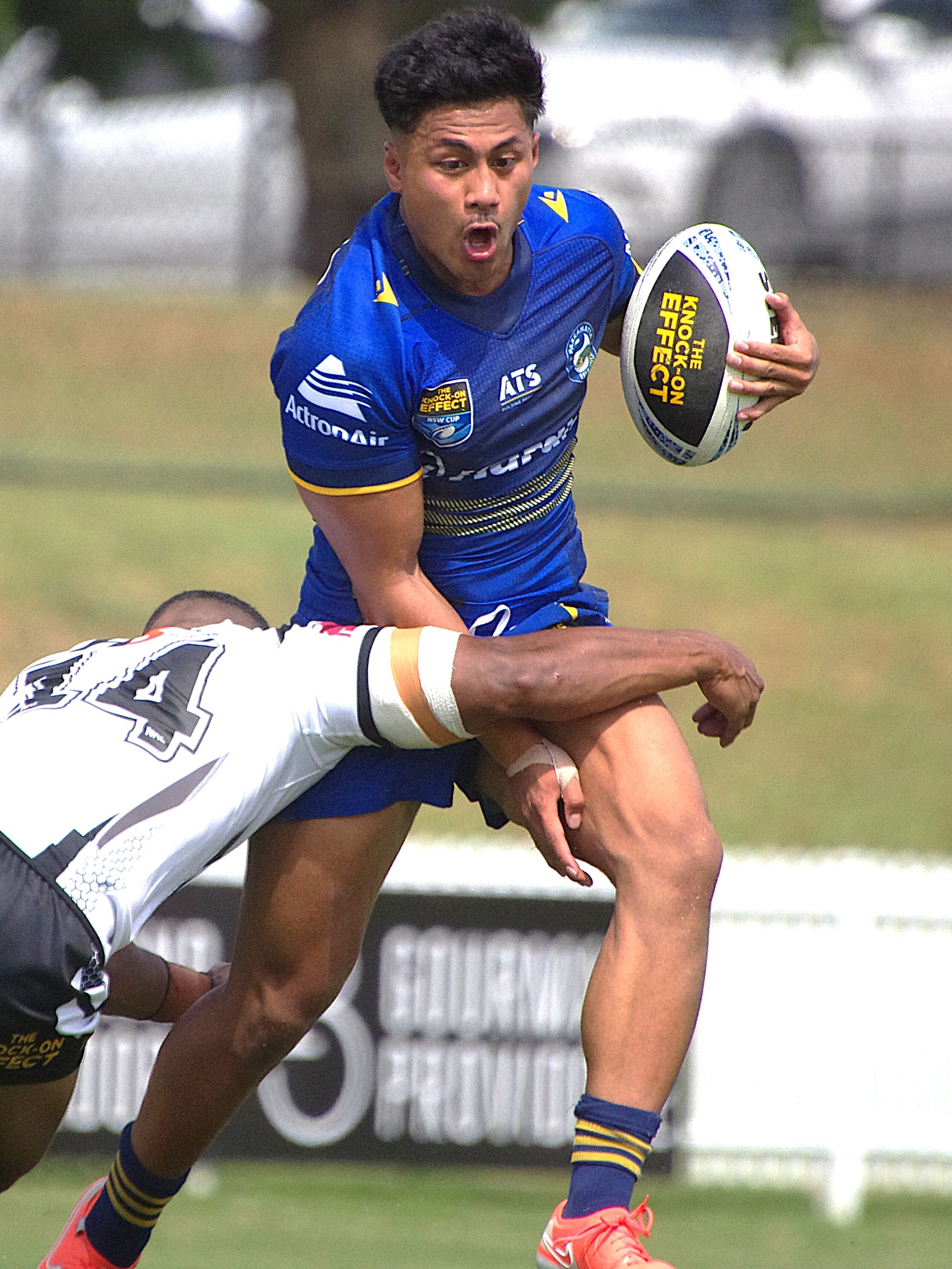

Personal information
- Full name: Joash Papali'i
- Born: 29 June 2004 (age 22) Campsie, New South Wales, Australia
- Height: 175 cm (5 ft 9 in)
- Weight: 84 kg (13 st 3 lb)

Playing information
- Position: Fullback, Five-eighth
Club
Years	Team	Pld	T	G	FG	P
2025–26	Parramatta Eels	26	6	3	0	30
- Source: As of 12 JUly 2026

Joash Papali'i (born 29 June 2004) is an Australian professional rugby league footballer who plays as a fullback for the Parramatta Eels in the National Rugby League and NSW Cup.

== Background ==
Papali'i attended Holy Spirit, Lakemba and was a Saint John's Eagles junior before signing a three-year deal to join Canterbury's pathway system. He is of Hawaiian and Samoan descent.

== Career ==
Papali'i played for the Canterbury-Bankstown Bulldogs in Harold Matthews and SG Ball competitions. In 2022, Papali'i won SG Ball player of the year In 2023, Papali'i graduated to Jersey Flegg, being selected on the bench for the NSW U19's Origin team. Papali'i played for Canterbury's NSW Cup team from 2023 to 2024.

Papali'i was released from the final year of his deal with Canterbury to sign a two-year deal with the Parramatta Eels until the end of 2026.

In Round 12 2025, Papali'i made his NRL debut for Parramatta against the Manly-Warringah Sea Eagles, coming off the bench and scoring a try in a 30–10 win at Commbank Stadium. Due to Will Penisini suffering a category 1 HIA, Papali'i came in to play Wing. On 11 July, the Eels announced that Papali'i had re-signed with the club until the end of 2027. Papali'i played 13 games for Parramatta in the 2025 NRL season as the club finished 11th on the table. He played 13 matches for Parramatta in the 2026 NRL season as the club finished 13th on the table.
