= Will Penisini =

Tonga rugby league footballer (born 2002)

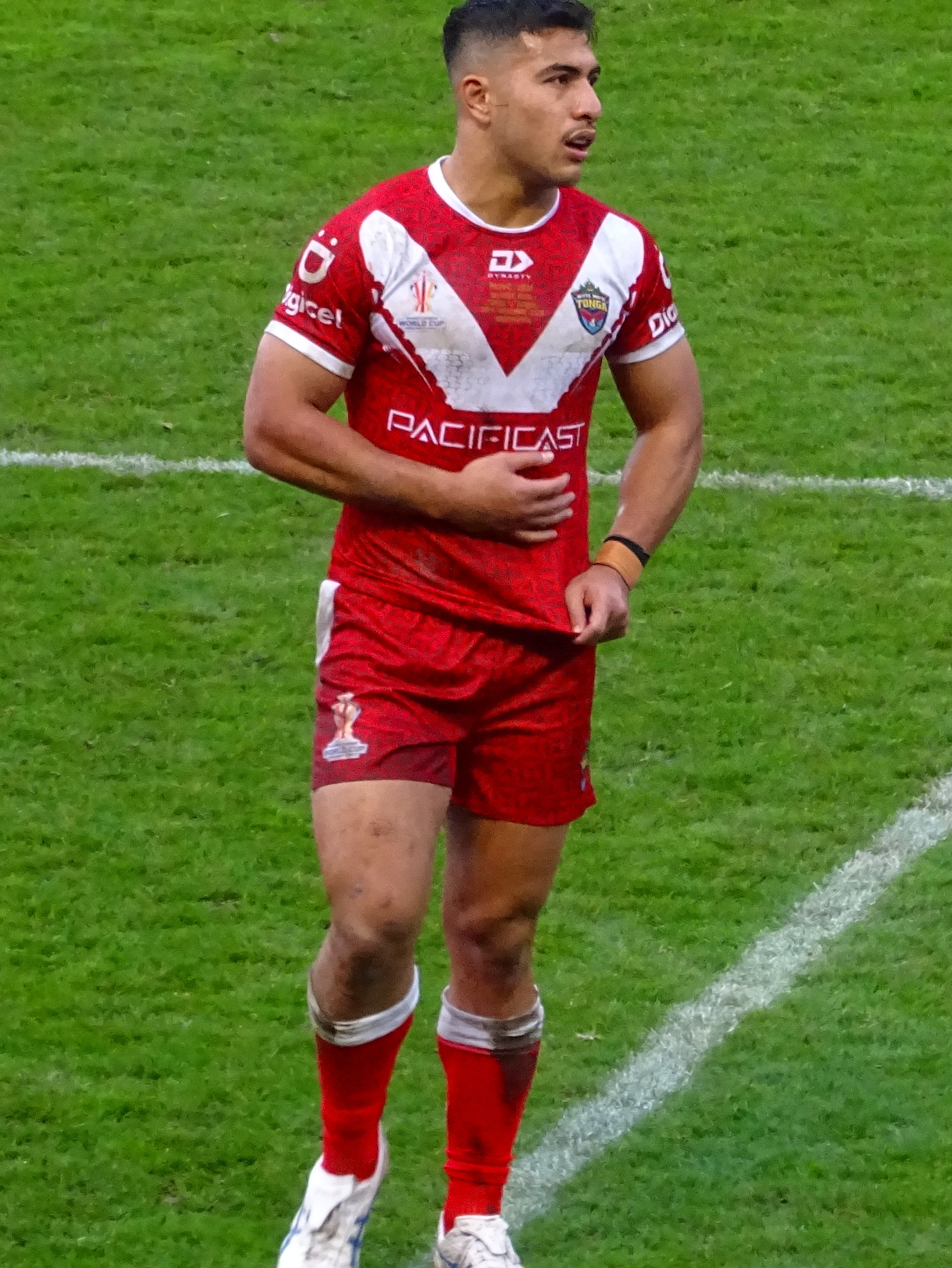

Personal information
- Full name: Viliami Penisini
- Born: 31 July 2002 (age 24) Blacktown, New South Wales, Australia
- Height: 183 cm (6 ft 0 in)
- Weight: 101 kg (15 st 13 lb)

Playing information
- Position: Centre
Club
Years	Team	Pld	T	G	FG	P
2021–	Parramatta Eels	112	40	0	0	160
Representative
Years	Team	Pld	T	G	FG	P
2022–25	Tonga	8	5	0	0	20
- Source: As of 6 September 2026

Viliami Penisini (born 31 July 2002) is a Tonga international rugby league footballer who plays as a centre for the Parramatta Eels in the National Rugby League.

== Background ==
Penisini was born in Blacktown, New South Wales, Australia. He is of Tongan heritage.

He played his junior football for the Rouse Hill Rhinos.

Penisini attended Quakers Hill East Public School from Kindergarten to Year 6, winning many sporting accolades and becoming a popular figure among his peers and teachers for his sporting prowess, particularly in rugby league and union. He first attended Patrician Brothers' College, Blacktown and then transferred at the end of year 7 to The King's School, Parramatta. While at King's, he was a member of the premiership winning First XV rugby union team in 2018 and captain of the undefeated First XV rugby union team in 2020.

In 2016, at the age of 14, Penisini joined Parramatta Eels' junior development squad.

== Playing career ==
=== 2019 & 2020 ===
Penisini played for Parramatta's SG Ball and Jersey Flegg teams in 2019 and 2020. Representing the NSW under 16s and 18s teams in 2018 and 2019, breaking his ankle in the under 18s game. Due to COVID-19, Penisini played for King's XV rugby union team.

=== 2021 ===
Penisini started 2021 training with Parramatta's first grade team, on March 4, 2021, Penisini was upgraded to the club's 30 man squad signing with Parramatta until the end of 2022. Penisini later re-signed with Parramatta for a further season until 2023. In round 19 2021, Penisini made his NRL debut for Parramatta against the Canberra Raiders in a 12–10 loss at Cbus Super Stadium on the Gold Coast. In round 23, he scored his first try in the NRL during a 32–16 victory over North Queensland side.

Penisini played in both of Parramatta's finals matches in the 2021 NRL season against Newcastle and Penrith.

=== 2022 ===
In round 11 of the 2022 NRL season, Penisini scored the winning try for Parramatta in their 22–20 victory over Manly.

Penisini played for Parramatta in their 2022 NRL Grand Final loss against Penrith.

In the third group game at the 2021 Rugby League World Cup, Penisini scored four tries in Tonga's 92-10 victory over the Cook Islands at the Riverside Stadium.

=== 2023 ===
On 31 January, Penisini signed a two-year contract extension to remain at Parramatta until the end of the 2025 season. In round 1 of the 2023 NRL season, he scored the first try of the year in Parramatta's golden point extra-time loss to Melbourne.

In round 17, Penisini scored two tries for Parramatta in their 48-20 victory over the Dolphins. Penisini played a total of 24 matches for Parramatta in the 2023 NRL season as the club finished 10th and missed the finals.

=== 2024 ===
Penisini played 23 games for Parramatta in the 2024 NRL season and scored ten tries as the club finished 15th on the table.

=== 2025 ===
On 21 May, the Parramatta club announced that Penisini had re-signed with the club until the end of 2026. In round 16 of the 2025 NRL season, Penisini scored two tries for Parramatta in their 36-20 victory over the Gold Coast. On 2 September, Penisini announced that he had re-signed with Parramatta until the end of 2028. Penisini played 20 games for Parramatta in the 2025 NRL season as the club finished 11th on the table.

=== 2026 ===
Penisini was limited to just twelve games for Parramatta in the 2026 NRL season as the club finished 13th on the table.

== Statistics ==
Year	Team	Games	Tries	Pts
2021	Parramatta Eels	5	2	8
2022	Parramatta Eels	28	10	40
2023	Parramatta Eels	24	8	32
2024	Parramatta Eels	23	10	40
2025	Parramatta Eels	20	6	24
2026	Parramatta Eels			
	Totals	100	36	144
