= Jason Ryles =

Australia international rugby league footballer and coach

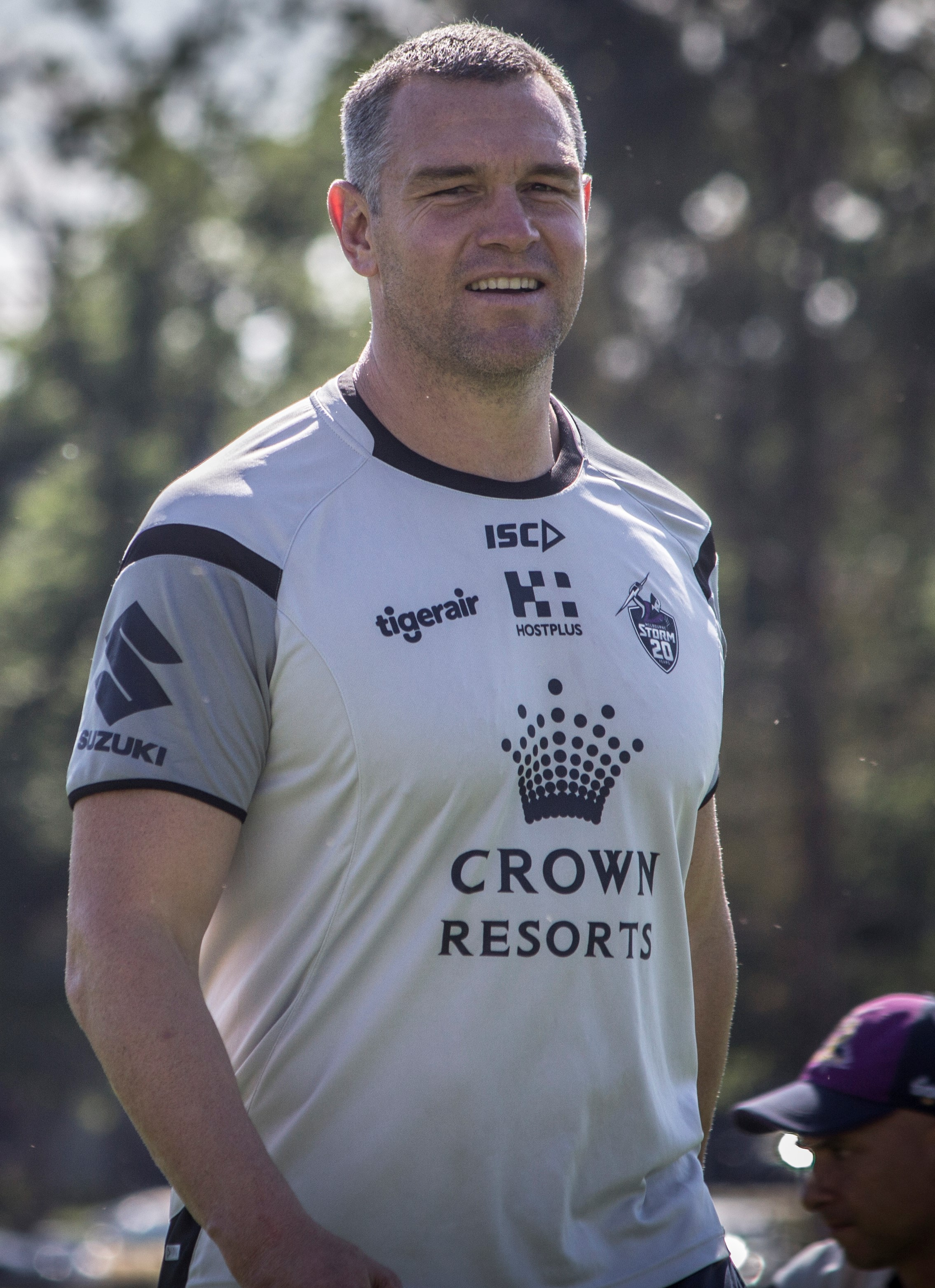

Personal information
- Full name: Jason Micheal Ryles
- Born: 17 January 1979 (age 47) Wollongong, New South Wales, Australia
- Height: 194 cm (6 ft 4 in)
- Weight: 116 kg (18 st 4 lb)

Playing information
- Position: Prop
Club
Years	Team	Pld	T	G	FG	P
2000–08	St. George Illawarra	156	13	0	0	52
2009	Catalans Dragons	22	2	0	0	8
2010–11	Sydney Roosters	46	2	0	0	8
2012–13	Melbourne Storm	46	1	0	0	4
	Total	270	18	0	0	72
Representative
Years	Team	Pld	T	G	FG	P
2001–05	Australia	15	1	0	0	4
2002–05	New South Wales	8	0	0	0	0

Coaching information
Club
Years	Team	Gms	W	D	L	W%
2022	Sydney Roosters	1	1	0	0	100
2025–	Parramatta Eels	48	19	0	29	40
	Total	49	20	0	29	41
- Source: As of 6 September 2026

Jason Jack Ryles (born 17 January 1979) is an Australian professional rugby league coach who is the head coach of the Parramatta Eels in the National Rugby League and former rugby league footballer.

He played mostly at prop for the St. George Illawarra Dragons, Sydney Roosters, and Melbourne Storm in the NRL, Catalans Dragons in the Super League, and for New South Wales and Australia at representative level.

He has also coached rugby union as an assistant with both England and Australia.

== Playing career ==
In 2000, Ryles made his National Rugby League debut, playing for the St. George Illawarra Dragons. At the end of the 2001 NRL season, he went on the 2001 Kangaroo tour. In June, 2008, St. George Illawarra announced Ryles had signed with French Super League club, Catalans Dragons for two years commencing in 2009.

Ryles returned to the NRL in 2010 with the Sydney Roosters and was part of the team that made the Grand Final that season. However, after a disappointing 2011 season for the Sydney Roosters, his contract was terminated one year before its expiry. He subsequently signed with the Melbourne Storm for the 2012 season. Melbourne, who were the minor premiers in 2011, cited Ryles' experience as a major factor in his signing. He played in the Melbourne Storm's 2013 World Club Challenge win over Leeds.

=== Representative career ===
Ryles had played fifteen Tests for Australia and represented the New South Wales Blues on eight occasions.

=== Playing highlights ===
- Junior Clubs: Berkeley & Wests Illawarra
- First Grade Debut: Round 15, St. George Illawarra v Parramatta, Parramatta Stadium, 14 May 2000

== Coaching career ==
Ryles began his coaching career in 2012 with NSW State of Origin under 20s side as their assistant coach, which also carried over to 2013. Both years were successful in defeating Queensland's under 20s team.

After his retirement as a player in the National Rugby League, Ryles accepted a head coaching role for Western Suburbs Red Devils and was their head coach for the 2014 and 2015 seasons, with his assistant being Mark Riddell. They were eliminated by the Helensburgh Tigers in back-to-back seasons under Ryles, in 2014 in the semi-final and in 2015 they would go on to make the Grand Final, losing 16-10 to the Minor Premiers in what would be Helensburgh's first mens title since 1993.

At the end of 2015, Ryles was approached by the Melbourne Storm to join their staffing team as assistant coach where he held this position until autumn 2020. While at Melbourne from 2016–2020, Ryles has also periodically assisted in coaching England's national rugby union team.

In 2016 and 2017, Ryles was appointed assistant coach for the Junior Kangaroos.

In autumn 2020, Ryles joined England as skills coach on a full-time basis. However he missed the 2021 Six Nations Championship due to travel restrictions relating to the COVID-19 pandemic. He left the role in May 2021.

In 2022, he joined the Sydney Roosters as an assistant coach. In 2023, he joined the coaching staff of the Australia national rugby union team for the 2023 Rugby World Cup. In 2024, he returned to the Melbourne Storm and was appointed the Coaching Coordinator there. On 8 July 2024, the Parramatta Eels announced he was appointed as the head coach on a four-year deal starting in 2025. Ryles tenure as Parramatta's new head coach got off to a disastrous start with the side losing 56-18 against Melbourne in round 1 of the 2025 NRL season. After suffering four losses in a row to start the season, Ryles earned his first win as Parramatta head coach in round 5 against St. George Illawarra. Ryles would eventually guide Parramatta to an 11th placed finish in his first year as the clubs new head coach recording ten wins. In round 1 of the 2026 NRL season under Ryles, Parramatta lost 52-4 against Melbourne. Parramatta became the first team since the competition began in 1908 to concede 50 points in back to back seasons in round 1. In round 6 of the 2026 NRL season, Parramatta were beaten by the Gold Coast 52-10. It was Parramatta's biggest loss at home for 31 years. In his second full year as Parramatta head coach, Ryles guided the club to a disappointing 13th place on the table. Parramatta had the worst injury toll of any NRL team in 2026.

== Statistics ==
=== Playing stats ===
Year	Team	Games	Tries	Pts
2000	St. George Illawarra Dragons	7		
2001	St. George Illawarra Dragons	27	3	12
2002	St. George Illawarra Dragons	20	4	16
2003	St. George Illawarra Dragons	9	2	8
2004	St. George Illawarra Dragons	14		
2005	St. George Illawarra Dragons	21	2	8
2006	St. George Illawarra Dragons	18		
2007	St. George Illawarra Dragons	17	1	4
2008	St. George Illawarra Dragons	23	1	4
2009	Catalans	22	2	8
2010	Sydney Roosters	26		
2011	Sydney Roosters	20	2	8
2012	Melbourne Storm	22	1	4
2013	Melbourne Storm	24		
	Totals	271	18	72
