= 2025 Wests Tigers season =

26th season of Wests Tigers

- NRL Rank: 13th
- Play-off result: Did not qualify
- 2025 record: Wins: 9; losses: 15
- Points scored: For: 477; against: 612

Team information
- CEO: Shane Richardson
- Coach: (New Zealand) Benji Marshall
- Captain: (Fiji) Apisai Koroisau
- Stadium: Leichhardt Oval; Campbelltown Sports Stadium
- Avg. attendance: 18,131
← 2024	List of seasons	2026 →

The 2025 Wests Tigers season was the 26th season in the club's history and in the National Rugby League. Coached by head coach Benji Marshall and co-captained by Apisai Koroisau and Jarome Luai, the team competed in the 2025 NRL Telstra Premiership during the regular season and participated in the Pre-season Challenge in February.

== Squad information ==
Wests Tigers 2025 squad
Top 30 squad - 2025 NRL season			Supplementary list	Coaching staff
Jack Bird – SR, CE; Jahream Bula – FB; Adam Doueihi – CE, HB; Solomona Faataape – CE; Latu Fainu – HB; Samuela Fainu – SR; Sione Fainu – PR; Josh Feledy – CE; Royce Hunt – PR; Apisai Koroisau (c) – HK	Kit Laulilii – LK, PR; Luke Laulilii – WG; Jarome Luai (c) – HB, FE; Justin Matamua – LK; Heath Mason – FB; Terrell May – PR; Brent Naden – CE; Fonua Pole – PR; Solomone Saukuru – CE; Alex Seyfarth – SR	Jeral Skelton – WG; Charlie Staines – WG; Tony Sukkar – SR, PR; Starford To'a – CE; Brandon Tumeth – SR; Sunia Turuva – WG; Alex Twal – LK	Will Craig – WG, CE; Tristan Hope – HK; Alex Lobb – WG; Reuben Porter – SR, PR; Train and trial: Elie El-Zakhem – SR; Charlie Murray – LK; Izaac Tu'itupou – WG	Head coach: Benji Marshall; Assistant coaches: Brett Hodgson; Chris Heighington; John Morris; Aaron Payne (NSW Cup Coach); Leon Latulipe (Jersey Flegg Cup Coach); Legend: (c) Captain(s); (vc) Vice-captain(s); Updated: 6 September 2025; Source(s): Wests Tigers

== Squad changes ==
=== Transfers in ===
Date	Pos.	Player	From	Window	Ref.

Signings
Player	Previous club	Contract ends	Ref
Jack Bird	St George Illawarra Dragons	2026	
Jarome Luai	Penrith Panthers	2029	
Jeral Skelton	Canterbury-Bankstown Bulldogs	2026	
Sunia Turuva	Penrith Panthers	2027	
Royce Hunt	Cronulla-Sutherland Sharks	2027	

=== Transfers out ===
Date	Pos.	Player	To	Window	Ref.

Losses
Player	Club	Ref
Aidan Sezer	Hull F.C.	
Isaiah Papali'i	Penrith Panthers	
Junior Tupou	Dolphins	
Stefano Utoikamanu	Melbourne Storm	
John Bateman	North Queensland Cowboys	
Justin Olam	Retired	

== Pre-season ==
Wests Tigers played the Canterbury-Bankstown Bulldogs in Kogarah and the Parramatta Eels in Leichhardt as their pre-season fixtures. Both matches were part of the third edition of the NRL Pre-season Challenge.

Win Draw Loss Fixtures

Round 1: 16 February 2025	Canterbury-Bankstown Bulldogs	20–14	Wests Tigers	Kogarah
17:30 AEDT	Tries: Todd 23'; R. Rinakama 38', 56'; Sua 64'; Goals: Taaffe 1/2 24'; Tia 1/2 66'	Report	Tries: Mason 32'; Faataape 42', 45'; Goals: Lobb 1/3 33'	Stadium: Nestrata Jubilee Stadium; Referee: Chris Butler

Round 2: 21 February 2025	Wests Tigers	30–18	Parramatta Eels	Leichhardt
20:00 AEDT	Tries: Naden 26'; Bird 29'; Skelton 39'; Hope 56'; Faataape 75'; Goals: Doueihi 5/5 27', 30', 39', 58', 76'	Report	Tries: Iongi 13'; Russell 35'; Williams 48'; Goals: Lomax 2/2 15', 36'; Volkman 1/1 49'	Stadium: Leichhardt Oval; Referee: Ashley Klein

== Regular season ==
=== Ladder ===
Pos	Team	Pld	W	D	L	B	PF	PA	PD	Pts	Qualification
1	Canberra Raiders	24	19	0	5	3	654	506	+148	44	Advance to finals series
2	Melbourne Storm	24	17	0	7	3	671	459	+212	40	Advance to finals series
3	Canterbury-Bankstown Bulldogs	24	16	0	8	3	534	414	+120	38	Advance to finals series
4	Brisbane Broncos (P)	24	15	0	9	3	680	508	+172	36	Advance to finals series
5	Cronulla-Sutherland Sharks	24	15	0	9	3	599	490	+109	36	Advance to finals series
6	New Zealand Warriors	24	14	0	10	3	517	496	+21	34	Advance to finals series
7	Penrith Panthers	24	13	1	10	3	576	469	+107	33	Advance to finals series
8	Sydney Roosters	24	13	0	11	3	653	521	+132	32	Advance to finals series
9	Dolphins	24	12	0	12	3	721	596	+125	30	
10	Manly Warringah Sea Eagles	24	12	0	12	3	555	534	+21	30	
11	Parramatta Eels	24	10	0	14	3	502	578	−76	26	
12	North Queensland Cowboys	24	9	1	14	3	538	684	−146	25	
13	Wests Tigers	24	9	0	15	3	477	612	−135	24	
14	South Sydney Rabbitohs	24	9	0	15	3	427	608	−181	24	
15	St. George Illawarra Dragons	24	8	0	16	3	498	628	−130	22	
16	Gold Coast Titans	24	6	0	18	3	520	719	−199	18	
17	Newcastle Knights	24	6	0	18	3	338	638	−300	18	

Source: National Rugby League
(P) Premiers

=== Results by round ===
Round	1
Ground	
Result	
Position	
Points	

Source: National Rugby League
A = Away; H = Home; N = Neutral; B = Bye; W = Win; D = Draw; L = Loss

=== Matches ===
The league fixtures were released on 21 November 2024.

Win Draw Loss Bye Fixtures

Round 1: 7 March 2025	Wests Tigers	8–10	Newcastle Knights	Campbelltown
18:00 AEDT	Tries: Skelton 6'; Goals: Doueihi 2/2 7', 28 pen'	Report	Tries: Sharpe 51'; Marzhew 66'; Goals: Ponga 1/2 52'	Stadium: Campbelltown Sports Stadium; Attendance: 13,160; Referee: Liam Kennedy

Round 2: 16 March 2025	Parramatta Eels	6–32	Wests Tigers	Parramatta
16:05 AEDT	Tries: Russell 79'; Goals: Lomax 1/1 80'	Report	Tries: Turuva 26', 67', 72'; To'a 35'; Galvin 39'; Skelton 42'; Goals: Doueihi 4/6 36', 39', 44', 68'	Stadium: CommBank Stadium; Attendance: 18,362; Referee: Grant Atkins

Round 3: 22 March 2025	Dolphins	18–30	Wests Tigers	Redcliffe
16:30 AEST	Tries: Bostock 4'; Farnworth 17'; Nikorima 22'; Goals: Isaako 3/4 5', 19', 30 pen'	Report	Tries: Turuva 8', 63'; Da Silva 35'; Seyfarth 68'; Koroisau 75'; Goals: Doueihi 5/5 9', 37', 64', 70', 76'	Stadium: Kayo Stadium; Attendance: 10,023; Referee: Peter Gough

Round 4: 30 March 2025	Wests Tigers	24–26	New Zealand Warriors	Campbelltown
18:15 AEDT	Tries: Pole 11'; To'a 38'; Faataape 49'; L. Fainu 52'; Goals: Koroisau 3/3 12', 51', 53'; Da Silva 1/1 39'	Report	Tries: Pompey 4'; Niukore 33'; Metcalf 41'; Halasima 69'; Goals: Metcalf 5/5 6', 34', 43', 71', 72 pen'	Stadium: Campbelltown Sports Stadium; Attendance: 12,020; Referee: Wyatt Raymond

Round 5: 5 April 2025	Brisbane Broncos	46–24	Wests Tigers	Brisbane
18:30 AEST	Tries: Arthars 4', 57'; Willison 37', 41'; Reynolds 44'; Walters 60'; Shibasaki 70'; Goals: Reynolds 4/4 6', 38', 42', 45'; Walsh 4/4 59', 61', 71', 79 pen' Field goals: Reynolds 39'; Sin bin: Piakura (yellow card) 19' to 29'	Report	Tries: L. Laulilii 14'; Turuva 26'; To'a 31', 75'; Si. Fainu 50'; Goals: Koroisau 2/3 52', 76'; Da Silva 0/1; Doueihi 0/1; Sin bin: To'a (yellow card) 79' to 80'	Stadium: Suncorp Stadium; Attendance: 41,012; Referee: Liam Kennedy

Round 6: 13 April 2025	Newcastle Knights	4–20	Wests Tigers	Newcastle
16:05 AEST	Tries: Sharpe 79'; Goals: Ponga 0/1; Sin bin: Gagai (yellow card) 52' to 62'	Report	Tries: Turuva 18'; To'a 27'; Bula 32'; Doueihi 58'; Goals: Doueihi 2/5 34', 53 pen' Sin bin: To'a (yellow card) 52' to 62'	Stadium: McDonald Jones Stadium; Attendance: 25,960; Referee: Gerard Sutton

Round 7: 21 April 2025	Wests Tigers	22–38	Parramatta Eels	Parramatta
16:00 AEST	Tries: May 22'; Bula 27'; Seyfarth 61'; Laulilii 67'; Goals: Doueihi 3/4 23', 63', 68'; Sin bin: Turuva (yellow card) 53' to 63'	Report	Tries: Addo-Carr 14', 77'; Iongi 32', 47'; Tuilagi 41'; Tuivaiti 44'; Simonsson 74'; Goals: Russell 3/6 3 pen', 43', 45'; Moses 1/1 76'; Smith 1/1 78'; Sin bin: Moretti (yellow card) 53' to 63'; Iongi (yellow card) 58' to 68'	Stadium: CommBank Stadium; Attendance: 26,145; Referee: Liam Kennedy

Round 12 (Bye for Wests Tigers)

Round 14: 8 June 2025	Wests Tigers	14–18	Penrith Panthers	Parramatta
16:05 AEST	Tries: To'a 18'; Turuva 26'; Skelton 69'; Goals: Doueihi 1/3 20'	Report	Tries: Jenkins 14', 39', 63'; Goals: Cleary 3/4 15', 54 pen', 64'	Stadium: CommBank Stadium; Attendance: 17,708; Referee: Ziggy Przeklasa-Adamski

Round 15 (Bye for Wests Tigers)

Round 19: 13 July 2025	New Zealand Warriors	34–14	Wests Tigers	Auckland
16:00 NZST	Tries: Berry 7'; Harris-Tavita 18', 72'; Watene-Zelezniak 32'; Tuivasa-Sheck 49'; Halasima 79'; Goals: Boyd 5/6 9', 19', 50', 74', 80'	Report	Tries: Skelton 1'; Doueihi 27', 56'; Goals: Doueihi 1/3 57'	Stadium: Go Media Stadium; Attendance: 24,112; Referee: Gerard Sutton

Round 22: 3 August 2025	Wests Tigers	28–14	Canterbury-Bankstown Bulldogs	Parramatta
14:00 AEST	Tries: Skelton 13', 29'; Bula 18'; Doueihi 32'; Sa. Fainu 70'; Goals: Doueihi 4/6 14', 34', 64 pen', 71'; Sin bin: Seyfarth (yellow card) 59' to 69'	Report	Tries: Preston 36'; Kiraz 51'; Curran 78'; Goals: Crichton 1/3 78'	Stadium: CommBank Stadium; Attendance: 17,423; Referee: Wyatt Raymond

Round 23 (Bye for Wests Tigers)

== Player statistics ==
As of pre-season

Players with no appearances are not included on the list.

Player	Apps	T	C	PG	FG	Total
