= 2024 Wests Tigers season =

Australian rugby league club season

- NRL Rank: 17th (Wooden spooners)
- Play-off result: DNQ
- 2024 record: Wins: 6; losses: 18
- Points scored: For: 463; against: 750

Team information
- CEO: Shane Richardson
- Coach: (New Zealand) Benji Marshall
- Captain: (Fiji) Apisai Koroisau
- Stadium: Leichhardt Oval (Capacity: 20,000); Campbelltown Sports Stadium (Capacity: 17,500)
- Avg. attendance: 12,653
- High attendance: 17,351 (vs. Brisbane in round 8)

Top scorers
- Tries: Jahream Bula (10)
- Goals: Apisai Koroisau (43)
- Points: Apisai Koroisau (112)
← 2023	List of seasons	2025 →

The 2024 Wests Tigers season is the 25th season in the club's history and they compete in the National Rugby League.

The captain Apisai Koroisau retains his captaincy for his 2nd consecutive season, while Head Coach Benji Marshall has his 1st season at his position.

The West Tigers became wooden spooners for the third year in succession, which was also their third time in club history.

== Squad information ==
Wests Tigers 2024 squad
Top 30 squad - 2024 NRL season			Supplementary list	Coaching staff
Solomon Alaimalo – WG; John Bateman – SR, LK; Jahream Bula – FB; Tallyn Da Silva – HK; Adam Doueihi – CE, HB; Latu Fainu – HB; Samuela Fainu – SR; Sione Fainu – PR; Josh Feledy – CE; Lachlan Galvin – FE	David Klemmer – PR; Apisai Koroisau (c) – HK, HB; Luke Laulili'i – WG, FB; Justin Matamua – LK; Jordan Miller – PR; Brent Naden – CE, WG, FB, HB; Justin Olam – CE; Isaiah Papali'i – SR, LK; Fonua Pole – LK, PR, SR; Alex Seyfarth – SR, LK	Aidan Sezer – HB, FE; Charlie Staines – WG, CE, FB; Jayden Sullivan – HB, FE; Starford To'a – CE, FB; Brandon Tumeth – SR; Junior Tupou – WG; Stefano Utoikamanu – PR; Alex Twal – LK, PR	Solomona Faataape – CE, WG; Chris Faagutu – LK; Kit Laulili'i – LK, PR; Alex Lobb – WG; Solomone Saukuru – CE; Tony Sukkar – SR, PR; Extended squad: Declan Casey – CE, FE; Heath Mason – FB, HB, WG; Reuben Porter – SR, PR	Head coach: Benji Marshall; Assistant coaches: Robbie Farah; Chris Heighington; John Morris; Aaron Payne (NSW Cup Coach); Leon Latulipe (Jersey Flegg Cup Coach); Legend: (c) Captain(s); (vc) Vice-captain(s); Updated: 6 September 2024; Source(s): Wests Tigers

== Squad changes ==
=== Transfers in ===
Ryan Fleming (Australian Rugby)

== Pre-season ==
The Tigers played the New Zealand Warriors in Christchurch and the St. George Illawarra Dragons in Mudgee as their pre-season fixtures. Both matches were part of the second edition of the NRL Pre-season Challenge.

Win Draw Loss

Round 1: 18 February 2024	New Zealand Warriors	16–18	Wests Tigers	Christchurch
16:00 NZDT	Tries: Laban 13'; Roache 62'; Tu 65'; Goals: Metcalf 1/1 14'; Farr 1/2 63'; Sent off: Maiu'u (red card) 19'	[Report; Details Report]	Tries: Seyfarth 8'; Sezer 16'; Latoa-Vaihu 57'; Goals: Koroisau 2/2 9', 17'; Lobb 1/2 59'; Sin bin: Sa. Fainu (yellow card) 40' to 50'	Stadium: Apollo Projects Stadium; Attendance: 13,670; Referee: Chris Sutton

Round 2: 24 February 2024	St. George Illawarra Dragons	34–18	Wests Tigers	Mudgee
20:05 AEDT		[Report Report]		Stadium: Glen Willow Oval; Attendance: 4,962; Referee: Kasey Badger

== Regular season ==
=== League table ===
Pos	Team	Pld	W	D	L	B	PF	PA	PD	Pts	Qualification
1	Melbourne Storm	24	19	0	5	3	692	449	+243	44	Advance to finals series
2	Penrith Panthers (P)	24	17	0	7	3	580	394	+186	40	Advance to finals series
3	Sydney Roosters	24	16	0	8	3	738	463	+275	38	Advance to finals series
4	Cronulla-Sutherland Sharks	24	16	0	8	3	653	431	+222	38	Advance to finals series
5	North Queensland Cowboys	24	15	0	9	3	657	568	+89	36	Advance to finals series
6	Canterbury-Bankstown Bulldogs	24	14	0	10	3	529	433	+96	34	Advance to finals series
7	Manly Warringah Sea Eagles	24	13	1	10	3	634	521	+113	33	Advance to finals series
8	Newcastle Knights	24	12	0	12	3	470	510	−40	30	Advance to finals series
9	Canberra Raiders	24	12	0	12	3	474	601	−127	30	
10	Dolphins	24	11	0	13	3	577	578	−1	28	
11	St. George Illawarra Dragons	24	11	0	13	3	508	634	−126	28	
12	Brisbane Broncos	24	10	0	14	3	537	607	−70	26	
13	New Zealand Warriors	24	9	1	14	3	512	574	−62	25	
14	Gold Coast Titans	24	8	0	16	3	488	656	−168	22	
15	Parramatta Eels	24	7	0	17	3	561	716	−155	20	
16	South Sydney Rabbitohs	24	7	0	17	3	494	682	−188	20	
17	Wests Tigers	24	6	0	18	3	463	750	−287	18	

Source: National Rugby League
(P) Premiers

=== Results by round ===
Round	1	2	3	4	5	6	7	8	9	10	11	12	13	14	15	16	17	18	19	20	21	22	23	24	25	26	27
Ground	–	A	H	A	A	H	A	H	A	H	N	A	–	A	H	H	A	H	A	A	A	H	A	H	H	–	H
Result	B	L	W	W	L	L	L	L	L	L	L	L	B	L	W	W	L	L	L	L	L	L	L	W	W	B	L
Position	9	12	9	6	9	12	13	15	15	15	15	16	16	17	16	16	17	17	17	17	17	17	17	17	17	17	17
Points	2	2	4	6	6	6	6	6	6	6	6	6	8	8	10	12	12	12	12	12	12	12	12	14	16	18	18

Source: National Rugby League
A = Away; H = Home; N = Neutral; B = Bye; W = Win; D = Draw; L = Loss

=== Matches ===
The league fixtures were announced on 13 November 2023.

Win Draw Loss Fixtures

Round 1 (Bye for Wests Tigers)

Round 2: 16 March 2024	Canberra Raiders	32–12	Wests Tigers	Canberra
15:00 AEDT	Tries: Levi 7'; Strange 11'; Rapana 30'; Savage 37'; Hosking 60'; Goals: Fogarty 6/7 6 pen', 8', 13', 32', 57 pen', 61'	Report	Tries: Sa. Fainu 24'; Koroisau 27'; Goals: Koroisau 2/2 25', 28'; Sin bin: Utoikamanu (yellow card) 77' to 80'	Stadium: GIO Stadium; Attendance: 16,968; Referee: Peter Gough

Round 3: 23 March 2024	Wests Tigers	32–6	Cronulla-Sutherland Sharks	Leichhardt
19:35 AEDT	Tries: Papali'i 20'; Seyfarth 34'; Olam 38'; Bula 51', 69'; Goals: Koroisau 4/4 22', 35', 45 pen', 53'; Sezer 2/2 39', 71'	Report	Tries: Hazelton 13'; Goals: Hynes 1/1 14'	Stadium: Leichhardt Oval; Attendance: 15,990; Referee: Chris Butler

Round 4: 1 April 2024	Parramatta Eels	16–17	Wests Tigers	Parramatta
16:00 AEDT	Tries: Sivo 15'; Gutherson 44'; Goals: Russell 0/1; Gutherson 4/5 39 pen', 46', 49 pen', 74 pen'	Report	Tries: Olam 3', 63'; Bula 68'; Goals: Koroisau 2/3 5', 69'; Field goals: Sezer 79'; Sin bin: Galvin (yellow card) 48' to 58'	Stadium: CommBank Stadium; Attendance: 28,608; Referee: Liam Kennedy

Round 5: 6 April 2024	Dolphins	26–16	Wests Tigers	Brisbane
18:35 AEST	Tries: Katoa 4'; Tabuai-Fidow 25'; Nikorima 61'; K. Bromwich 65'; Goals: Isaako 5/6 10 pen', 24 pen', 27', 62', 66'	Report	Tries: Faataape 42', 54'; Seyfarth 72'; Goals: Sezer 2/3 43', 74'	Stadium: Suncorp Stadium; Attendance: 22,051; Referee: Gerard Sutton

Round 6: 14 April 2024	Wests Tigers	12–24	St. George Illawarra Dragons	Campbelltown
16:05 AEST	Tries: Utoikamanu 14'; Kepaoa 70'; Goals: Koroisau 2/3 23 pen', 71'	Report	Tries: Lomax 1'; Bird 25'; Flanagan 36'; Su'a 62'; Goals: Lomax 4/5 27', 38', 59 pen', 63'	Stadium: Campbelltown Sports Stadium; Attendance: 17,141; Referee: Grant Atkins

Round 7: 20 April 2024	Penrith Panthers	22–6	Wests Tigers	Bathurst
15:00 AEST	Tries: Turuva 15', 26'; Alamoti 63'; Fisher-Harris 71'; Goals: Edwards 3/4 17', 64', 72'	Report	Tries: Tupou 8'; Goals: Koroisau 1/1 10'	Stadium: Carrington Park; Attendance: 12,000; Referee: Wyatt Raymond

Round 8: 27 April 2024	Wests Tigers	10–34	Brisbane Broncos	Campbelltown
17:30 AEST	Tries: Staines 69', 73'; Goals: Sezer 1/2 74'; Sin bin: Sa. Fainu (yellow card) 16' to 26'	Report	Tries: Mariner 5'; Madden 17', 43'; Walsh 39', 54'; Haas 64'; Goals: Reynolds 5/6 18', 39', 44', 56', 66'	Stadium: Campbelltown Sports Stadium; Attendance: 17,351; Referee: Grant Atkins

Round 9: 4 May 2024	Canterbury-Bankstown Bulldogs	22–14	Wests Tigers	Sydney Olympic Park
15:00 AEST	Tries: Mann 22'; Curran 44'; Xerri 56'; Goals: Burton 5/5 24', 45', 49 pen', 53 pen', 57'	Report	Tries: Staines 15'; Pole 26'; Goals: Sezer 3/3 13 pen', 16', 28'; Sin bin: Klemmer (yellow card) 73' to 80'; Seyfarth (yellow card) 73' to 80'	Stadium: Accor Stadium; Attendance: 17,068; Referee: Kasey Badger

Round 10: 11 May 2024	Wests Tigers	14–20	Newcastle Knights	Tamworth
15:00 AEST	Tries: Papali'i 15', 52'; Naden 78'; Goals: Sullivan 1/3 16'; Sin bin: Bula (yellow card) 25' to 35'	Report	Tries: Marzhew 27'; Tuala 39'; Armstrong 43'; Best 63'; Goals: Gagai 2/5 44', 65'; Sin bin: Saifiti (yellow card) 73' to 80'	Stadium: Scully Park; Attendance: 10,107; Referee: Ziggy Przeklasa-Adamski

Round 11: 19 May 2024	Wests Tigers	12–24	Dolphins	Brisbane
18:25 AEST	Tries: Olam 35'; Koroisau 53'; Goals: Koroisau 2/2 36', 55'; Sin bin: Naden (yellow card) 39' to 49'; Olam (yellow card) 46' to 56'	Report	Tries: Bostock 12'; Nicholls 27'; Tabuai-Fidow 48', 69'; Goals: Isaako 4/4 13', 28', 50', 70'	Stadium: Suncorp Stadium; Attendance: 47,517; Referee: Chris Butler

Round 12: 24 May 2024	North Queensland Cowboys	42–28	Wests Tigers	Townsville
18:00 AEST	Tries: Feldt 4', 14'; Nanai 6', 72'; McIntyre 52'; Holmes 57', 79'; Goals: Holmes 7/8 5', 8', 12 pen', 16', 53', 59', 74'; Sin bin: Holmes (yellow card) 36' to 46'	Report	Tries: Alaimalo 25'; Bula 27'; Sa. Fainu 41'; Utoikamanu 75'; Twal 77'; Goals: Koroisau 2/3 29', 43'; Sullivan 2/2 75', 77'	Stadium: Queensland Country Bank Stadium; Attendance: 15,957; Referee: Belinda Sharpe

Round 13 (Bye for Wests Tigers)

Round 14: 7 June 2024	St. George Illawarra Dragons	56–14	Wests Tigers	Wollongong
20:00 AEST	Tries: Flanagan 22'; Lomax 27', 75', 79'; Mat Feagai 45', 66'; Leilua 52', 60'; Hunt 57'; Goals: Lomax 10/10 24', 29', 47', 49 pen', 54', 58', 61', 68', 77', 79'	Report	Tries: Lobb 4'; Sullivan 12'; Seyfarth 39'; Goals: Koroisau 1/3 13'; Sin bin: Sullivan (yellow card) 49' to 59'	Stadium: WIN Stadium; Attendance: 9,969; Referee: Chris Butler

Round 15: 15 June 2024	Wests Tigers	18–10	Gold Coast Titans	Leichhardt
15:00 AEST	Tries: Olam 11', 59'; Pole 76'; Goals: Koroisau 3/3 12', 61', 77'	Report	Tries: S. Fifita 5'; Campbell 19'; Goals: Campbell 1/2 6'	Stadium: Leichhardt Oval; Attendance: 8,147; Referee: Ashley Klein

Round 16: 23 June 2024	Wests Tigers	48–24	Canberra Raiders	Campbelltown
16:05 AEST	Tries: Galvin 3', 40'; L. Laulilii 10'; Si. Fainu 34'; Bula 43'; Utoikamanu 52'; Koroisau 57'; Doueihi 73'; Goals: Koroisau 8/8 4', 12', 35', 42', 44', 54', 59', 74'; Sin bin: Seyfarth (yellow card) 62' to 72'	Report	Tries: Levi 47'; Cotric 62'; Weekes 64'; Strange 68'; Goals: Rapana 4/5 39 pen', 48', 65', 68'	Stadium: Campbelltown Sports Stadium; Attendance: 10,106; Referee: Todd Smith

Round 17: 30 June 2024	Sydney Roosters	40–6	Wests Tigers	Moore Park
18:15 AEST	Tries: Young 14', 16'; May 20'; Keary 31'; Tupou 48', 68'; Tedesco 64'; Radley 66'; Goals: Walker 4/8 15', 21', 50', 65'	Report	Tries: Pole 79'; Goals: Koroisau 1/1 80'; Sin bin: Koroisau (yellow card) 55' to 65'; Doueihi (yellow card) 63' to 73'	Stadium: Allianz Stadium; Attendance: 14,711; Referee: Ziggy Przeklasa-Adamski

Round 18: 6 July 2024	Wests Tigers	28–40	Melbourne Storm	Leichhardt
17:30 AEST	Tries: Staines 11', 70'; Pole 18'; Galvin 59'; Bula 79'; Goals: Koroisau 4/5 12', 19', 60', 79'; Sin bin: Faataape (yellow card) 45' to 55'	Report	Tries: Katoa 14'; Papenhuyzen 27'; Warbrick 30'; Anderson 46'; Fa'alogo 54', 73'; Wishart 68'; Goals: Wishart 6/8 16', 31', 48', 56', 70', 77 pen'	Stadium: Leichhardt Oval; Attendance: 10,311; Referee: Peter Gough

Round 19: 12 July 2024	Cronulla-Sutherland Sharks	58–6	Wests Tigers	Cronulla
20:00 AEST	Tries: Iro 2'; Mulitalo 13', 47', 58'; Katoa 24', 37'; Hamlin-Uele 54'; Nikora 62'; Ramien 76'; Trindall 78'; Goals: Trindall 9/10 3', 15', 25', 38', 55', 60', 63', 76', 79'	Report	Tries: Faataape 9'; Goals: Koroisau 1/1 10'; Sin bin: Koroisau (yellow card) 17' to 27'	Stadium: PointsBet Stadium; Attendance: 10,912; Referee: Adam Gee

Round 20: 20 July 2024	South Sydney Rabbitohs	42–28	Wests Tigers	Gosford
15:00 AEST	Tries: Moale 6'; Walker 9', 59'; Johnston 26', 35'; Mamouzelos 63'; Gray 72'; Goals: Cook 7/8 11', 27', 36', 43 pen', 61', 65', 73'	Report	Tries: Galvin 15'; Da Silva 18'; Bula 40'; Staines 47'; Si. Fainu 54'; Goals: Sezer 4/5 16', 19', 40', 56'; Sin bin: Sezer (yellow card) 68' to 78'	Stadium: Industree Group Stadium; Attendance: 16,284; Referee: Wyatt Raymond

Round 21: 26 July 2024	New Zealand Warriors	28–16	Wests Tigers	Auckland
20:00 NZST	Tries: Capewell 9'; Kosi 33'; Leiataua 37'; Fonua-Blake 69'; Watene-Zelezniak 74'; Goals: Harris-Tavita 4/6 38', 61 pen', 71', 76'	Report	Tries: Papali'i 51'; Staines 55'; Koroisau 79'; Goals: Koroisau 2/3 53', 80'	Stadium: Go Media Stadium; Attendance: 23,976; Referee: Peter Gough

Round 22: 1 August 2024	Wests Tigers	30–48	North Queensland Cowboys	Leichhardt
19:50 AEST	Tries: Sa. Fainu 3', 75'; Bula 36', 42'; Alaimalo 59'; Faataape 62'; Goals: Koroisau 3/6 37', 60', 75'; Sent off: Olam (red card) 49'	Report	Tries: Dearden 18'; Taulagi 22', 31', 50'; Drinkwater 53', 70'; Holmes 56'; Feldt 78'; Goals: Holmes 7/8 19', 23', 32', 47 pen', 51', 54', 57'; Drinkwater 1/1 79'	Stadium: Leichhardt Oval; Attendance: 7,231; Referee: Chris Butler

Round 23: 11 August 2024	Newcastle Knights	34–18	Wests Tigers	Newcastle
16:05 NZST	Tries: Frizell 12'; Sharpe 20', 30', 39', 55'; Mapapalangi 44'; Goals: Ponga 5/6 13', 21', 39', 45', 57'	Report	Tries: Doueihi 16'; Faataape 26'; Bula 47'; Goals: Sezer 3/3 17', 28', 48'	Stadium: McDonald Jones Stadium; Attendance: 22,183; Referee: Belinda Sharpe

Round 24: 17 August 2024	Wests Tigers	18–16	South Sydney Rabbitohs	Campbelltown
19:35 AEST	Tries: Staines 9'; L. Laulilii 18'; Doueihi 31'; Goals: Sezer 3/4 11', 32', 49 pen'	Report	Tries: Gray 14'; Koloamatangi 57'; Cook 77'; Goals: Myers 2/3 58', 78'; Sin bin: Kennar (yellow card) 31' to 41'	Stadium: Campbelltown Sports Stadium; Attendance: 11,420; Referee: Belinda Sharpe

Round 25: 22 August 2024	Wests Tigers	34–26	Manly Warringah Sea Eagles	Leichhardt
19:50 AEST	Tries: Koroisau 25'; Mason 29'; Seyfarth 46'; L. Fainu 52'; Faataape 57'; Sa. Fainu 79'; Goals: Sezer 2/2 27', 30'; Koroisau 3/4 48', 53', 58'	Report	Tries: Saab 6'; Hopoate 10'; T. Trbojevic 22', 61', 69'; Goals: Garrick 3/5 7', 23', 62'; Sin bin: Bullemor (yellow card) 36' to 46'; Olakau'atu (yellow card) 46' to 56'; Waddell (yellow card) 65' to 75'	Stadium: Leichhardt Oval; Attendance: 11,520; Referee: Peter Gough

Round 26 (Bye for Wests Tigers)

Round 27: 6 September 2024	Wests Tigers	26–60	Parramatta Eels	Campbelltown
18:00 AEST	Tries: Feledy 11'; Tupou 14'; L. Fainu 48'; Papali'i 67'; Staines 79'; Goals: Koroisau 2/3 15', 60'; Mason 1/1 70'; L. Fainu 0/1; Sin bin: Koroisau (yellow card) 51' to 61'	Report	Tries: Sivo 6', 55'; Asi 20'; Hands 29'; Penisini 35', 40'; Cartwright 52'; Gutherson 61', 64'; Campbell-Gillard 69'; Lussick 73'; Goals: Asi 6/9 8', 31', 37', 54', 63', 66'; Gutherson 1/1 70'; Campbell-Gillard 1/1 75'	Stadium: Campbelltown Sports Stadium; Attendance: 17,311; Referee: Peter Gough

== Player statistics ==
As of 13 April 2024
