= Kit Laulilii =

Australian rugby league footballer (born 2005)

Personal information
- Full name: Kit Laulili'i
- Born: 25 February 2005 (age 21) Sydney, New South Wales, Australia
- Height: 178 cm (5 ft 10 in)
- Weight: 107 kg (16 st 12 lb)

Playing information
- Position: Prop, Lock
Club
Years	Team	Pld	T	G	FG	P
2023–26	Wests Tigers	3	0	0	0	0
2027–	Perth Bears
	Total	3	0	0	0	0
- Source: RLP

Kit Laulilii (born 25 February 2005) is an Australian rugby league footballer who plays as a prop or lock for the Perth Bears in the NRL.

He previously played for the Wests Tigers in the National Rugby League.

== Early life ==
Born and raised in Sydney, Laulilii is the elder brother of rugby league player Luke Laulilii and is of Samoan descent. He played junior rugby league for the Liverpool Catholic Club Raiders and East Campbelltown, as well as at schoolboys level with Westfields Sports High School.

== Career ==
Laulilii, a middle forward, is a product of the Wests Tigers junior sides and was captain of their Harold Matthews Cup team in 2022 which went unbeaten through the season. In the final round of the 2023 NRL season, Laulilii made his first-grade debut at the age of 18, utilised off the bench against Manly-Warringah. He appeared in a further two NRL matches over the next three seasons, before being secured by the Perth Bears on a two-year deal, alongside brother Luke, for the club's entry to the competition in 2027.
