= Tumeth =

Tumeth is the Anglicized form of a Scottish Gaelic surname, originating in Renfrewshire. Notable people with the surname include:

- Brandon Tumeth (born 2003), Australian rugby player
- Tori Tumeth (born 2001), Australian soccer player
