= Wests Tigers =

Australian rugby league football club

Club information
- Full name: Wests Tigers Rugby League Football Club Pty Ltd
- Nickname(s): The Tigers, Wests
- Short name: WST
- Colours: Black; White; Orange
- Founded: 27 July 1999 (joint-venture of the Balmain Tigers and Western Suburbs Magpies)
- Website: www.weststigers.com.au

Current details
- Grounds: Campbelltown Stadium (18,000); Leichhardt Oval (20,000)
- CEO: Shaun Mielekamp
- Chairman: Barry O'Farrell
- Coach: Benji Marshall (NRL); Craig Sandercock (NRLW)
- Captain: Apisai Koroisau & Jarome Luai (NRL); Kezie Apps (NRLW)
- Competition: National Rugby League
- 2026 season: 15th
- Current season

Uniforms
Home colours	Away colours

Records
- Premierships: 1 (2005)
- Runners-up: 0
- Minor premierships: 0
- Wooden spoons: 3 (2022, 2023, 2024)
- Most capped: 277 – Robbie Farah
- Highest try scorer: 100 – David Nofoaluma
- Highest points scorer: 1181 – Benji Marshall

The Wests Tigers are an Australian rugby league football team, based in the Inner West of Sydney and South Western Sydney. The Tigers have competed in the National Rugby League (NRL) since being formed at the end of the 1999 NRL season as a joint-venture club between the Balmain Tigers and the Western Suburbs Magpies.

The Wests Tigers started playing in the 2000 NRL season and won their sole premiership in 2005. The club also won the final edition of the World Sevens in 2004. The club has only qualified for three finals series since their inception (2005, 2010 and 2011).

The Wests Tigers play home games at two grounds: Leichhardt Oval (the home ground of Balmain) and Campbelltown Stadium (the home ground of Western Suburbs). They are currently coached by Benji Marshall.

The CEO is currently Shaun Mielekamp.

== History ==
Chart of yearly table positions for Wests Tigers in First Grade NRL

=== Background ===
In Australia, the game of rugby league began in 1908; the New South Wales Rugby League premiership (NSWRL) had nine teams from the Sydney area. Two of those teams were clubs based in Balmain and the Western Suburbs who happened to meet each other in round 1 of 1908. Balmain won, 24 to 0. The Balmain club, who later adopted a Tiger as their emblem, in their tenure in the NSWRL won eleven premierships in twenty grand finals and was one of the forces in the NSWRL competition. However their last premiership success was in 1969 and in the 1990s with many new clubs being established, there was pressure on clubs to perform to survive in the first grade competition in Australia. The name Wests Tigers is derived from the nickname of the Western Suburbs Magpies and the mascot, a tiger, was the mascot of Balmain.

The Western Suburbs club won four premierships in twelve grand finals over the tenure of the NSWRL competition. The Western Suburbs Magpies, like the Balmain Tigers, had a dismal 1990s winning rate, and again there was pressure on the foundation clubs to perform. The NSWRL competition was replaced by the Australian Rugby League competition (ARL) in 1995 due to the expansion of rugby league within Australia.

With a media-driven rival competition being set up, the pressure was for clubs to survive and preserve their short-term future. Both the Magpies and the Tigers signed with the ARL, whereas eight clubs of the 1995 ARL competition signed with the rival Super League competition for 1997. In 1998, the ARL and Super League were unified into a National Rugby League (NRL) competition. As part of the deal with the ARL and Super League, the NRL competition reduced to fourteen teams in 2000 from the twenty two that had competed across both the ARL and Super League competitions in 1997. With the addition of the Melbourne Storm in 1998, this meant that nine teams would be forced out before the 2000 season.

=== Foundation ===
With the NRL offering guaranteed entrance into the 2000 competition and A$6 million funding for clubs that merged, many clubs that were struggling to compete negotiated to merge. Balmain had garnered interest to merge with the Parramatta Eels and Gold Coast Chargers while Western Suburbs had talked with the Canterbury-Bankstown Bulldogs and Penrith Panthers. Both Balmain and Western Suburbs felt that those offers were seen more as takeovers of their clubs rather than mergers. By June 1999, both clubs' boards had unanimously voted to form a joint-venture partnership with each other to make a competitive entity.

One hundred shares were issued to Balmain Tigers Rugby League Football Club and 100 shares were issued to Western Suburbs Rugby League Football Group Pty Limited as a 50/50-owned joint venture. Due to Western Suburbs's record-breaking dismal season in 1999, they supplied just six of the twenty-five players to the new joint venture. A board of directors was appointed with five sourced from Balmain, five sourced from Western Suburbs, with a rotating chairman serving a one-year appointment. The inaugural chairman of the joint venture was John Chalk, who was previously involved with Balmain Tigers, and Steve Noyce was appointed CEO.

== Playing seasons ==
=== Coach Wayne Pearce 2000 ===
Balmain coach Wayne Pearce was the initial coach of the Wests Tigers and new recruit Jarrod McCracken was named captain. Before the first round, the Tigers were denied a place in the double header at Stadium Australia. The debut match for the team was therefore held at Campbelltown, against eventual premiers the Brisbane Broncos, where after leading 18–6 the team snatched a 24-all draw after falling behind late in the game. John Skandalis scored the Tigers' first ever try.

The Tigers surprised many by maintaining a high place on the ladder for most of the year (often in second place). Losses to the Penrith Panthers (after leading 31–8) and in the snow against the Canberra Raiders combined with injuries to key players saw the Tigers slide out of the top eight. The loss of captain Jarrod McCracken from a spear tackle against Melbourne was a crucial blow.

A highlight of their first season is that Wests' Joel Caine claimed the 2000 NRL season's top point-scorer spot.

=== Coach Terry Lamb 2001–2002 ===
2001 was a tough season for the joint venture club, including off-field incidents. After Wayne Pearce announced he would no longer coach the team, Terry Lamb was appointed to the position. This was a controversial selection because of animosity from Balmain supporters due to an incident involving Ellery Hanley in the 1988 Grand Final (see Terry Lamb entry for more information).

Early in the season, key players Craig Field and Kevin McGuinness tested positive to prohibited drugs and both received a one-year suspension. Field was the team's halfback and playmaker while McGuinness was a leading try scorer for the club.

Later in the season another big name player was suspended: John Hopoate earned worldwide notoriety when he was charged with inserting his finger into the anus (pushing the players' shorts) of opposition players. Hopoate quit the club and received a long suspension. Lamb was criticised for seeming to condone the activity.

During the season the club announced Terry Lamb would not have his contract renewed. The team struggled near the foot of the ladder and only a large victory over Souths moved them clear of the wooden spoon position.

The coaching job for 2003 was offered to (and rejected by) both Craig Bellamy and Ian Millward before Tim Sheens was selected. The selection was by no means seen as a positive move by the media as Sheens' most recent coaching stint had seen him sacked by the North Queensland Cowboys.

=== Coach Tim Sheens 2003–2012 ===
The 2003 season was notable for the emergence of new young players through the team as the club moved away from the era of big names and big money signings and focused on developing junior talent. Most notably Benji Marshall, then a schoolboy prodigy with no senior league experience, made his debut against the Newcastle Knights.

The Tigers improved greatly in 2004 with provided help by signings of players such as Brett Hodgson and Pat Richards who began to blend well with the younger players emerging as talents. The Tigers narrowly missed the playoffs after losing their final three games when a single victory would have guaranteed finals football for the first time.

==== Premiership success ====
2005 was arguably the Wests Tigers' best season as of their foundation, as they not only made it to the finals for the first time, but also reached the top four in the round robin part of the competition, setting crowd attendance records at three different grounds: Campbelltown Stadium (20,527), Telstra Stadium (29,542) and Leichhardt Oval (22,877).

After a slow start, bookmakers rated the Tigers a 150–1 chance to win the premiership. However the club emerged from the bottom half of the table to win a club-record eight in a row before finishing fourth. The team developed a reputation as a flamboyant attacking team who played at a rapid pace to compensate a lack of forward size.

The Tigers played their first ever final as a joint venture club at Telstra Stadium against North Queensland Cowboys. Backed by a passionate crowd the team won 50–6. They then beat the Brisbane Broncos 34–6 and premiership favourites St. George Illawarra Dragons 20–12 to book a spot against North Queensland.

Based on their winning form (they had won 11 of their last 13) and their big win over the Cowboys in the opening finals game, the Wests Tigers were rated favourites to win the 2005 grand final. After a slow start, Bryce Gibbs and Pat Richards scored tries to give the Tigers a 12–6 lead. The Richards try was ranked the second best try of all time in the NRL's Centenary of Rugby League 100 Hot Tries survey. The try was started by five-eighth Benji Marshall, who received the ball from Brett Hodgson (after receiving a down field kick) 98 metres from the opposition tryline. He beat Cowboys five-eighth Johnathan Thurston and Matt Sing. Marshall then ran 60 metres, only to be caught by Cowboys fullback Matt Bowen. He made a flick pass to Pat Richards behind his back, who then fended off Rod Jensen to score.

In the second half the Tigers gained control with tries to Anthony Laffranchi and Daniel Fitzhenry. After withstanding a Cowboys fightback, a Todd Payten try on full-time sealed a 30–16 win. Captain Scott Prince was awarded the Clive Churchill Medal for 2005.

The premiership victory meant that the club joined an exclusive group that won premierships in their first finals appearance, which had not been achieved in almost 100 years. The group also includes Souths in 1908 and Newtown in 1910.

At the end of the 2005 season, Wests also signed Malaysian car manufacturer Proton as its major new sponsor on a contract estimated to be worth more than $1 million.

==== Post grand final failure ====
Following the premiership win several key players left the club. From the grand final team, Mark O'Neill, and Pat Richards signed with English clubs (Leeds Rhinos and Wigan Warriors respectively). New signings included Jamaal Lolesi (Bulldogs), Keith Galloway (Cronulla Sharks) and Ryan O'Hara (Canberra Raiders).

As defending premiers, the Wests Tigers began the season by travelling to England to play English Super League champions the Bradford Bulls. Missing many of their star players, the Tigers tried hard but were eventually beaten 10–30. After a come from behind win over competition heavyweights St George Illawarra, the team struggled with injuries to key players. Most notably Benji Marshall and Brett Hodgson missed large portions of the season. The team suffered a number of narrow losses late in games and also two golden point (extra time) matches in controversial circumstances.

The Wests Tigers narrowly missed the finals and the chance to defend their title. One highlight of the season was the debut of several players including Chris Lawrence and the emergence of up and coming players such as Dean Collis. Brett Hodgson played for the New South Wales team in the interstate State of Origin series in all three games. Another highlight was an upset win over eventual premiers the Brisbane Broncos at Suncorp Stadium where a second-string Tigers team missing Hodgson, Marshall, Whatuira and Gibbs beat the more experienced Broncos 20–6.

Joining the club for the 2007 season was John Morris (ex Parramatta Eels) to replace Scott Prince who signed with the Gold Coast Titans. Other players to leave at the end of the 2006 season were John Skandalis, Anthony Laffranchi and Shane Elford — all members of the 2005 grand final team.

The Wests Tigers had a bad start to the season losing their opening four games by narrow margins. They then had a six-game winning streak to move into the top four. The Tigers' five-eighth Benji Marshall and full-back Brett Hodgson missed the majority of the season with injuries.

The Wests Tigers ended their attempt at a finals berth and finished the season on a loss to the Newcastle Knights, 26–24, at the then-Telstra Stadium.

The following two seasons ended in the same fashion with the Tigers missing out on the finals narrowly in 2008 and 2009 finishing 10th and 9th.

In February 2008, the Wests Tigers announced the extension of Benji Marshall's contract by one year, to the end of 2009. They also announced the signing of Gareth Ellis, the Leeds Rhinos second-rower and international representative, to a three-year deal commencing in 2009.

On an administrative level, in April 2008, CEO Steve Noyce announced he was standing down from his role and was eventually replaced by Scott Longmuir at the end of the 2008 season.

==== Continued off-field troubles ====
Following the appointment of Scott Longmuir as CEO, there were rumours that Scott and then coach Sheens did not see eye to eye. Longmuir was aligned with then chair of the board Kevin Hammond (from the Wests side of the JV) in wanting Sheens to focus on the football, and for the office of the CEO to run the club as a business. At the time the financial backing from the three leagues clubs was very minimal, and Longmuir attempted to modernise the management of the club. However, with a majority of the board backing Sheens, Longmuir was eventually removed from his role in April 2009.

On 14 April 2009, Tim Camiler (CEO Balmain Leagues Club) and Andy Timbs (General Manager Wests Ashfield Leagues Club) were appointed temporary joint CEO's of the football club

In June 2009, Stephen Humphreys was announced as the new CEO, beginning his role in July. Humphreys was a lifelong Balmain Tigers fan, with the appointment brokered by ex-Balmain player, Benny Elias. His first major decision was to ensure continuity on the pitch, maintaining Tim Sheens as Head Coach of the football club.

==== Return to finals football ====
In February 2010, the Wests Tigers announced the signing of former Rugby Union star Lote Tuqiri for three years, and the signing of Benji Marshall for a further five.

In 2010 the club finished third in the minor premiership competition, narrowly missing out on a grand final spot after losing to eventual premiers St. George Illawarra Dragons in the preliminary final by one point.

At the end of 2010, it was announced that Meriton had signed a 2-year agreement to become major shirt and club sponsor for the 2011 and 2012 season. This placed the large M logo on the Wests Tigers redesigned shirts for 2 years

2011 was another successful season with the Tigers finishing fourth and making the semi-finals yet again, where they were defeated by a late try to the New Zealand Warriors in a loss.

==== Form slump ====
Despite being backed as premiership favourites at the start of the season, the Tigers failed to qualify for the finals in the 2012 season finishing 10th. On 25 September 2012, in a press conference CEO Stephen Humphreys and Chairman Dave Trodden announced that Tim Sheens would not be the head coach in 2013 in a restructuring of the club. This came a week after the loss of long-term players Beau Ryan and Chris Heighington to the Cronulla-Sutherland Sharks for the 2013 season, and a poor 2012 season on the field. Heighington had one year on his contract left while a handshake deal with Ryan had been made back in February.

=== Coach Mick Potter 2013–2014 ===
At the end of the 2012 season, Mick Potter was given the head coaching job on a two-year deal to help rebuild the club.

Success was far from achieved with the Tigers missing out on the finals in the 2013 and 2014 seasons finishing 15th and 13th respectively.

In further upheaval at the club, CEO Stephen Humphreys stepped down from his role in May 2013, with continued boardroom issues cited as a major factor.

In June 2013 Wests Campbelltown sold their shares in the joint venture to Wests Ashfield Leagues, and pulled out of the joint venture. This sale left Balmain Leagues Club and Wests Ashfield Leagues club with 100 shares each in the joint venture

On 26 July, the club announced Grant Meyer had been appointed as CEO

During this period Benji Marshall announced his decision to leave the club at the end of 2013, and signed a deal to play rugby union in New Zealand

The 2014 season was another poor season for the Wests Tigers and there was growing unrest from the club and fans about the results under Mick Potter.

Subsequently, following a mid year and end review by Meyer, Mick Potter did not have his coaching contract renewed, with the club issuing a press release confirming his release in September 2014. Potter finished his tenure at the club with a record of 17 wins and 31 losses.

==== Off-field restructure – 2014 ====
In September 2014, with the ongoing financial troubles at Balmain Leagues Club (who by this stage had defaulted on payments to the Wests Tigers) a new shareholder agreement was put into place with the supervision of the NRL. A new seven-person board was nominated with two from Balmain Tigers, two from Wests Leagues and three independents. A new NRL deed was issued along with a new Wests Tigers constitution being drawn up. Mike Bailey continued as chairman of the board of Wests Tigers.

The proposed 7-person board was never ratified, and a reduced board of five was approved by the NRL.

As at 5 September 2014, Wests Tigers Board of Directors consisted of the following:

Marina Go – Chairperson (Independent NRL Appointment), Tony Andreacchio - (Wests Ashfield Leagues Board Member), Simon Cook - (Wests Ashfield Leagues CEO), Lucio Bartololeo - (Independent NRL Appointment), Rosemary Sinclair - (Independent NRL Appointment)

Balmain Leagues Club had no appointed directors due to the club moving into funding default, and were termed "unfinancial shareholders". Balmain were in debt to the NRL to a sum of nearly AU$5 million, which was due to be repaid on 16 March 2016. At the time, it was announced that should Balmain Leagues Club fail to repay the loan, the shares would be considered "in default" and would be placed for sale. The agreement was made that Wests Ashfield Leagues Club would be offered first call to buy all the shares, pay off the NRL debts and become sole owner. If Wests Ashfield declined, the shares could be offered for general sale.

One of the first tasks for the board was to appoint a new club coach. The club moved to appoint Jason Taylor (who had played for Western Suburbs between 1990 and 1993) on 29 September 2014 for the oncoming 2015 season, following guidance of CEO Meyer, and supported by Chair Go. Phil Moss also joined the club as general manager of football operations at the same time.

=== Coach Jason Taylor 2015–2017 ===
Jason Taylor began the new season with Robbie Farah as captain. The first game of the season started off vs the Gold Coast Titans. A far from convincing performance gave the Tigers a one-point field goal victory coming from the boot of Pat Richards. The season ended with Wests Tigers 15th on the ladder sharing 20 points with the Knights, with Tigers goal difference preventing the wooden spoon.

Off the pitch politics continued through the year with ownership issues still dominating headlines for the football club, with the NRL maintaining its financial interest in the club given the poor state of affairs at Balmain Leagues Club. Adding to the troubles at the club, CEO Grant Meyer tendered his resignation on 15 June 2015

The club also made headlines with rumours and stories that the club coach and captain were in difference of opinion about how the team should be playing. In August 2015 the club made a statement on their website announcing that Farah had been given permission to speak with other football clubs for the 2016 season.

The new club CEO was announced on 4 September 2015 with Justin Pascoe, previously at Penrith Panthers, appointed to the role.

September 2015 also saw the announcement of a three-year sponsorship agreement with Brydens Lawyers. The three-year multimillion-dollar deal was the largest in the club's history and saw Brydens logo on the front and sleeve of the Wests Tigers jerseys.

The 2016 season started off with Aaron Woods replacing Robbie Farah as club captain, and the club made a promising start to the season with home wins against New Zealand Warriors and Manly Warringah Sea Eagles. A string of losses including a 60 points to 6 loss against the Canberra Raiders left the club struggling at the lower end of the table. Off field, the drama surrounding Robbie Farah continued with speculation that he would leave the club by the end of the season.

After a string of mixed results, including two wins against rivals South Sydney, but a poor loss to Newcastle left Wests Tigers 9th on the ladder, a point away from the top 8 at the end of the full season.

The end of the season also saw the Robbie Farah saga concluded, with Farah penning a two-year deal with South Sydney Rabbitohs. Robbie left the club having played 247 games and scoring 61 tries.

In April 2017, the "Big Four" story began from the media after there were reports Mitchell Moses, James Tedesco, Aaron Woods and Luke Brooks had all been looking to leave the club over issues with the salary cap and uncertainty with the playing roster heading into 2018. The four players were also reportedly not willing to continue playing with the club if Jason Taylor remained as head coach. Brooks would later sign a two-year contract extension whilst Moses, Woods and Tedesco would all depart the club with Moses being granted a mid-season release to Parramatta. Early in the 2017 season, after a pair of heavy defeats to the Penrith Panthers and Canberra Raiders, Taylor was dismissed from his position as head coach.

Assistant Coach Andrew Webster was appointed as caretaker manager whilst the CEO and board recruited a new full-time replacement.

==== Off-field restructure and new ownership – 2016 ====
2016 also had its watershed moment with the ownership of the football club finally resolved. On 5 May 2016 the club released a statement announcing the restructure of the football club

In an $8.5 million deal, Wests Ashfield Leagues Club assumed majority ownership of the football franchise. As the press statement read "The ownership structure sees Wests move to 75% ownership with Balmain retaining 25% and the Board expanded to nine directors". Wests Ashfield Leagues Club (and by relationship Wests Magpies) has settled all debts owed to the NRL by the Wests Tigers Football club. Balmain Tigers Leagues Club in a separate financial agreement had an outstanding loan and debt to NRL. Wests Ashfield Leagues Club were guarantors of that loan. Note that the loan was not secured against the Wests Tigers Football Club.

The new board had five members appointed from Wests Ashfield, two from Balmain along with two independents.

=== Coach Ivan Cleary 2017–2018 ===
After a week of rumours in the press on 3 April 2017, it was announced that Ivan Cleary had accepted the role of coach through to the end of the 2020 season with immediate effect, at a press conference held at Wests Ashfield Leagues Club.

During a press conference with Coach Cleary late on in April, a single near throwaway comment was made by Ivan about how he approached his first meeting with the players. He said to the press "I told the players you are either on the bus, or you are off it". This one line became a marketing slogan used through his tenure as coach and the "On The Bus" slogan became used by fans and media alike.

2017 turned out to be a poor one for Wests Tigers on the field with The NRL team finishing in 14th spot, The Under 20s Holden Cup team finishing 2nd to last and The NSW Cup team finishing with the wooden spoon.

In the 2018 NRL season, Wests started off the year with impressive wins over the Sydney Roosters and Melbourne before a mid season slump saw the club only winning 3 out of 10 games between Round 10 and Round 20. Wests would end up finishing in 9th position on the table missing the finals. Their final game of the year was a 51–10 loss against the South Sydney Rabbitohs.

Towards the end of the season, rumours and news swirled around the press and media about Ivan Cleary leaving the Wests Tigers to return to Penrith Panthers.

On 28 October 2018, Wests released coach Ivan Cleary from the final two years of his contract. Cleary also sent a departing text message to the tigers playing group saying "G'day boys I hope this finds you well and enjoying your time off, I was writing to you in the hope of beating the press.. to let you know that I will no longer be your coach at Wests Tigers. This is an extremely uncomfortable situation for me as I have genuine fondness for the club, and I have loved coaching you all.. I understand that this situation has caused some pain for people that I care about, along with putting the club in an awkward situation... I do not feel good about this. I would have preferred to do this in person but time and circumstances have made that impossible. I hope we meet again soon and I wish you all the very best in the future. You have my number and I am always open for a chat if you wish. Iv".

=== Coach Michael Maguire 2019–2022 ===
With the signs that Cleary was leaving the club, a search was underway for his replacement. The same day the club announced Cleary's departure Michael Maguire was announced as coach through to the end of 2021. One of Michael Maguires early decisions at the club following the Christmas break was to remove the "co-captain" arrangement and appoint Moses Mbye as the club's sole and only captain.

Under the guidance of Maguire, Wests Tigers football club has changed the team's slogan. "On the Bus" was replaced with "This is Our Jungle" for the 2019 season.

==== Salary cap breaches ====
On 19 December 2018 the NRL Integrity Unit under the guidance of the NRL CEO Todd Greenberg announced the Wests Tigers had been found to have fraudulently and intentionally breached the NRL Salary Cap. Greenburg announced that when playmaker Robbie Farah was released to the South Sydney Rabbitohs in 2016, CEO Justin Pascoe had offered to employ Farah back at the club on his retirement from football in return for Robbie agreeing to leave without incident. Despite Farah never accepting this position, and despite this story being broadcast in the media at the time, the NRL Integrity Unit decided that this offer was a sufficient incentive for Robbie to leave, it should have been formally lodged with the NRL. This was constituted a serious breach of the salary cap. The football club was fined $750,000, include the alleged salary offered to Robbie of $639,000 to the 2019 salary cap and CEO Pascoe was advised it was the intention of the NRL to de-register the experienced sports administrator from ever managing a club in the NRL.

The football club appealed this decision, and on 1 March 2019 the NRL backtracked on the position from December 2018 and halved the fine to $350,000, allowed the club to split the $639,000 of the cap breach over seasons 2019 and 2020 and CEO Justin Pascoe would be stood down for 6 months only (backdated to the original date of 19 December 2018).

In the interim, Wests Ashfield CEO, Simon Cook, assumed the role of interim CEO at the football club, and temporarily stood down from his position on the football club board. Head of Football Kelly Egan left the club prior to Pascoe's return as did chairman Marino Go and Chief Operating Officer Ryan Webb.

Justin Pascoe was re-instated back to his role as CEO on 26 June 2019

==== Change of chair of the board ====
On 12 March 2019 the club announced to the media and press that former New South Wales premier Barry O'Farrell had been appointed as chair of the board of directors, replacing Marina Go, who had come to the end of her tenure.

==== Season 2019 ====
The 2019 NRL season began with the knowledge that the club would take occupancy in the newly constructed Western Sydney Stadium in Parramatta. Four home games were allocated to this exciting new venue. The opening game of the season was played in wet conditions at Leichhardt Oval in front of 13,000 fans, with the team victors 20–6 against a poor Manly Warringah Sea Eagles team. A second round win against the free running New Zealand Warriors a week later in front of nearly 10,000 fans in Campbelltown again in wet conditions was a good start to the season. In round 6 against the Parramatta Eels, Wests played in the first NRL game at the new Western Sydney Stadium which ended in the club losing 51–6.

Wests Tigers took another "home" game on the road in 2019, with a match hosted in Scully Park in Tamworth. Nearly 10,000 fans turned out to watch Wests run out 30–14 victors over lower placed Gold Coast Titans.

The first home game of the season at the newly named BankWest stadium was held on Friday 7 June against the Canberra Raiders. The 0–28 result in front of 12,000 supporters lent some fans to make the comment "This is not our jungle".

Wests Tigers playmaker, Benji Marshall, played his 300th game in the NRL on 14 July at BankWest stadium in front of more than 25,000 fans. Wests lost the game 30–18 against the Parramatta Eels.

In round 25 against Cronulla-Sutherland, Wests went into the game knowing that whoever won the match would be guaranteed a finals spot as both teams came into the last game of the year on equal points. Wests would end up losing the match 25–8 at a packed Leichhardt Oval which was also retiring Robbie Farah's final game. The loss also meant that this was the sixth time that Wests had finished ninth since the joint venture started in 2000.

==== Change of chair of the board ====
On 13 November 2019 the club announced Lee Hagipantelis had been appointed chair of the board of the football club. Whilst Mr O'Farrell had only been with the club for a short while, he resigned his post to take up the position of ambassador to India for Australia.

Lee Hagipantelis is the Principal of Wests Tigers shirt sponsor, Brydens Lawyers.

==== Season 2020 ====
The new season was kicked off with an away game against St. George Illawarra at WIN Stadium in Wollongong. Wests Tigers ran out 24–14 victors against the Red V. The season was interrupted with the global pandemic COVID-19 following the opening round, with all games being placed on hiatus.

When the shortened NRL season recommenced, all games were played initially behind closed doors. Wests played six matches with no fans able to visit the stadia to watch the games. Fans were re-admitted in limited numbers in round 8 with Wests Tigers losing to Penrith in front of 5000 fans at Bankwest Stadium.

2020 saw the club fall to 11th position, with only seven wins and thirteen losses. The club also set a new, unwanted, record being the first side to concede 24 points or more in a game for ten consecutive matches.

On 18 August Chris Lawrence announced he would be retiring from the Wests Tigers and from Rugby League as a player. Lawrence retired having played 253 games for the club, and having scored 84 tries

On 1 September the club announced that Benji Marshall would not be playing on into 2021. This announcement was seen by many fans as deplorable and a petition soon garnered almost 10,000 signatures by fans, with Benji later claiming that he heard about this news via the press, not from the club. Marshall left the club having played 257 games over two stints at the club scoring 84 tries.

==== Player swap 2020 ====
The 2020 NRL season at Wests Tigers was also memorable for the first of its kind "player swap". Melbourne hooker Harry Grant and Wests Tigers centre, Paul Momirovski swapped club's for the 2020 season. The deal, brokered by Melbourne coach Craig Bellamy and Wests coach Michael Maguire, was the first of its kind within the NRL modern era game. The two players swapped playing clubs for the remainder of the 2020 NRL season.

==== Share ownership change ====
On 2 October 2020 the Amalgamation of Wests Ashfield Leagues Club and Balmain Tigers Leagues Club was cemented. As per the Deed of Amalgamation, this changed the ownership structure of the club to effectively be 90% Wests Ashfield, 10% Balmain Tigers.

==== Season 2021 ====
The 2021 NRL season opened with fresh hope for Wests Tigers fans. With a number of new signings at the club including Jimmy "The Jet" Roberts, and Daine Laurie in as fullback, the club moved Adam Doueihi to Number 6 to partner Luke Brooks in the halves, with Jacob Liddle coming in as hooker.

The first five rounds however were not a great success, with the club picking up only two points with a win over Newcastle. In round 4 of the 2021 NRL season against Parramatta at Stadium Australia, the match recorded the highest attendance at a Rugby League game so far in 2021 with an official attendance of 29,056.

In round 5 of the competition, there was a lot of emotion at Leichhardt Oval, with the club paying tribute following the death of Western Suburbs legend, Tommy Raudonikis. The #7 jersey was retired for the game in memoriam, with Luke Brooks running out in #22. The game itself was more known for the team being booed off by fans at half time, trailing the un-fancied North Queensland Cowboys 28–6. The game ended up 34–30 to North Queensland with Wests Tigers rallying in the second half.

April 2021 also saw a minor change to the board of directors of the football club, with Mick Liubinskas being replaced by Julie Romero. Like Mick, Julie was a nominee by Wests Ashfield Leagues Club, a director of that leagues club and a Wests Ashfield Debenture holder.

In round nine of the 2021 NRL season, the club played at Campbelltown Sports Ground and they wore specially designed jerseys as part of a celebration into the life of Tommy Raudonikis OAM. The match ball was delivered onto the pitch by Tommy's partner, Trish. Wests Tigers lost the game against the Gold Coast 36–28.

In June 2021, it was announced that Premiership winning coach, Tim Sheens, would be returning to the club in the capacity of Head of Football Performance focussing on pathways, development and talent identification.

The Wests Tigers finished the 2021 NRL season in 13th place after an awful season which saw them only win three times in the last eleven games. In the final round of the season, Wests were defeated 38–0 by Wooden Spooners Canterbury-Bankstown. After this point, there were talks that head coach Michael Maguire was to be terminated from his position but on 21 September it was announced he would be kept on as head coach for the 2022 season.

On 15 October 2021, the club announced that general manager of football, Adam Hartigan, had left the club.

==== Season 2022 ====
The 2022 NRL season began with key playmakers Adam Doueihi and Daine Laurie sidelined through injury, but with new signing Jackson Hastings moving into the number 7 position, with Luke Brooks shifting to 6. After 12 rounds heading into the bye round for the State of Origin series, Wests Tigers had only achieved three wins for the season so far. After much rumour in the press, on 7 June the football club announced the termination of head coach, Michael Maguire. Brett Kimmorley was then handed the role as interim head coach until the end of the season whilst the football club searched for a full-time replacement. In round 23, the club was defeated 72–6 by the Sydney Roosters which made it the second worst loss in Tigers history, the worst was 68–0 against the Penrith Panthers.

In round 24, Wests Tigers lost 24–22 against St. George Illawarra, the result meant that the club would finish bottom of the table and claim their first Wooden Spoon in club history. The Wests Tigers lost their last game of the season 56–10 at Leichhardt Oval against the Canberra Raiders. The score was 42–0 at halftime.

=== Coach Tim Sheens 2023 ===
Before the end of season 2022, the club announced that ex-head coach Tim Sheens was returning to the role of Head Coach of the beleaguered club. This was to be Tim Sheens second stint as head coach of the football club. It was announced he would start his new role at the commencement of the 2023 preseason.

==== Coaching appointments ====
The club was announced that Benji Marshall and Robbie Farah would be appointed to the coaching team for the following two seasons (2023 and 2024) and for Benji Marshall to take the reins of the club for season 2025 as head coach in his own right, with Tim Sheens to move back to his role as director of football.

==== Season 2023 ====
The club started the 2023 NRL season as they did the year previously losing their opening five matches. They became the first club since Newtown in 1968 and 1969 to lose their first five matches in two consecutive seasons. On 4 April 2023, the club came under criticism from fans and the media after they released a commemorative ANZAC jersey with a stock image of American soldiers on the front and back. The club then released a statement which read "As a club Wests Tigers is deeply sorry if the use of this image has in any way offended anyone, This was never our intention, and we are taking steps to rectify this". In round 9, the Wests Tigers won their first match in 273 days as they upset back to back premiers Penrith 12–8.

Round 12 saw the Wests Tigers biggest win of the season, and signs of a recovery of the club, with a score of 66–18 against the North Queensland Cowboys, with a 100% conversion of all eleven tries.

The week following this match, the club announced that Joe Ofahengaue was leaving the club in a mid-season move to the Parramatta Eels.

In round 18, the club suffered the third biggest loss in Australian rugby league history losing 74–0 against North Queensland. It was also the biggest loss by any team of the NRL era. It came after just two months prior where the Wests Tigers defeated North Queensland 66–18.

On 16 August 2023, the Wests Tigers released a statement detailing how Tim Sheens had requested to stand down as head coach at the end of the season, with Benji Marshall to take over head coaching duties from 2024 rather than 2025 as originally planned. Wests Tigers chairman Lee Hagipantelis claimed in an interview with Fox Sports that the decision to fast-track Marshall to the head coaching role had been considered for some time due to him exceeding expectations in his role as Sheens' assistant coach.

During a game at Commbank Stadium, unhappy fans started to show their anger with the management of the club by unfurling a banner at the home game against the Dolphins aimed at the CEO Justin Pascoe. Further banners were unfurled by fans at the away game against the Manly Warringah Sea Eagles at Brookvale Oval.

In round 26 of the 2023 NRL season, Wests Tigers finished with the Wooden Spoon for a second consecutive season after they lost 32–8 against the Sydney Roosters. Wests Tigers needed to win their remaining two matches to avoid finishing in last place. The Wests Tigers Jersey Flegg Cup team also finished with the Wooden Spoon in their respective competition which capped off a bad year for the club.

==== Independent review ====
On 15 September 2023 the club began a review of all football operations following the second wooden spoon. The review was conducted by former NRL chief financial officer Tony Crawford and managing director of Cooperage Capital Pty Ltd Gary Barnier. The club confirmed at the time no deadline had been set for the completion of the review.

Whilst the review had only started a few days earlier, it was publicised that Lee Hagipantellis had been re-appointed as an independent board member and chair of the board for a further three years

On 28 September 2023 James Myatt resigned from the board of directors of the football club.

Only weeks after confirming Lee Hagipantellis was to remain as chair of the board, news broke that the director Tony Andreacchio had called Lee to request he stand down and resign as chair of the board.

==== Appointment of new board and CEO ====
On 12 December 2023 with the first phase of the independent review complete, the entire board of directors of the club was stood down, and the club CEO Justin Pascoe resigned his role. Shane Richardson (former South Sydney Rabbitohs CEO) was appointed as the interim chief executive, whilst Barry O'Farrell, former premier of New South Wales, returned to the club as the interim chair of the board.

Two new board members, Danny Stapleton and David Gilbert, were appointed, representing shareholders Balmain Tigers RLFC and Holman Barnes Group respectively. (Later in 2024 David Gilbert was replaced by Stephen Montgomery)

=== Coach Benji Marshall 2024–present ===
Prior to the end of the 2023 season, Benji Marshall, who had previously been the club's assistant coach, was appointed as head coach from the commencement of pre-season training for season 2024.

One of the first appointments was adding John Morris as assistant and defensive coach for season 2024. Morris rejoined the club he played more than 70 games for, often playing alongside Marshall. The club endured another tough campaign in the 2024 NRL season winning only six matches all year. At one stage, the club went through a nine-game losing streak. In round 27, the Wests Tigers had the chance of avoiding their third straight wooden spoon as they played against Parramatta in what was dubbed by the media as the "Spoon Bowl". Wests would lose the match 60-26 which ensured they would finish with the wooden spoon for a third consecutive season. It capped off a bad year for the club with the NSW Cup team Western Suburbs also finishing with the wooden spoon.

The shining light of the season was Shane Richardson's role as CEO being made permanent on a four-year deal to commence 2 July 2024. In the 2025 NRL season, Wests Tigers finished 13th on the table after recording nine wins for the year, their most wins in a season since 2019. In the 2026 NRL season, Wests finished in a disappointing 15th place on the table. In the early rounds of the year, Wests sat second on the table after round 8 but the club capitulated in the second half of the season winning only three games. At one stage the club was on an eight-game losing streak. The Wests Tigers were also rocked by the mid-season announcement that star recruit Jarome Luai would be leaving his contract early to join the new PNG side in 2028. There was also drama towards the back end of the season with Adam Doueihi refusing to play for the club after being played out of position.

==== New sponsors ====
Brydens Lawyers shirt and major club sponsorship expired at the end of season 2024, and the club revealed a new shirt sponsorship with Pepper Money, marking a further achievement of the largest sponsor deal in the clubs history. Real estate construction development company Pama also increased their sponsorship becoming the new sternum shirt sponsor for a 3-year term.

==== New directors ====
Following on from the full club review, three new independent directors were appointed by the club: Charlie Viola (former partner at Pitcher Partners), Michelle McDowell (former MD of Allied Express) and Annabelle Williams OAM PLY (lawyer and former Paralympic gold medallist).

At the first full board meeting on 28 January 2025, Barry O'Farrell was voted in as chair of the board on a full-time basis.

==== Reported proposed moves to end joint venture ====
In 2024, there were two reports that the joint venture might come to end. On 29 August, it was reported that the Balmain board was looking to pull out of the joint venture with the Western Suburbs Magpies. Balmain chairman Danny Stapleton rejected these claims the next day. In December, it was reported that there was a plot for the Western Suburbs Magpies to take full control of the club, and return the Magpies brand to the NRL in a leaked text. Former Balmain Tiger Benny Elias declared his belief the next day that 100,000 fans will descend on Sydney's streets in protest. Both of these reports have been unsubstantiated with a lack of any further evidence.

==== Board upheaval ====
The majority owning Holman Barnes Group put out a press release on 1 December 2025 advising that the four independent directors were being stood down with immediate effect. The four directors being Barry O'Farrell, Annabelle Williams, Charlie Viola and Michelle McDowell. The Holman Barnes Group stated the Wests Tigers board was not communicating with the majority shareholders in a satisfactory manner. On 8 December, CEO Shane Richardson resigned from his position at the club.

On 10 December, most of the former board members including O'Farrell were brought back following intervention by the NRL.

== Ownership, board and corporate governance ==
Wests Tigers are a joint venture, which was formed between Wests Magpies and Balmain Tigers football clubs.

=== Western Suburbs Leagues Club Ltd ===
Running under the name Holman Barnes Group, there are three locations: Wests Ashfield Leagues Club, Croydon Sports and the Markets Club at Homebush West. The group is the primary financial donor to the Wests Tigers rugby league franchise outside of the revenue provided by the NRL and corporate sponsorship. From 2014 Wests Ashfield was the only Leagues Club which directly subsidised the Wests Tigers Rugby League franchise.

=== Balmain Tigers Rugby League Football Club Ltd ===
A foundation club of the NSWRFL, Balmain Tigers Rugby League Football Club was established on 23 January 1908 at Balmain Town Hall. The club has competed in the NSWRL competitions for 110 years, winning 11 first grade premierships.

Also operating a club known as Balmain Leagues Club, the operating business was built in 1957. The original site was situated on the corner of Victoria Road and Darling Street, Rozelle. The club was the venue for a celebration party after Wests Tigers won the NRL Premiership in 2005.

The Leagues Club closed its doors on 28 March 2010, with the former club site now vacant after receiving a notice to vacate the site to make way for the proposed Rozelle Village development to go ahead.

Balmain Leagues Club entered voluntary administration on 26 October 2018.

In September 2019, members of both Balmain Leagues Club and Wests Ashfield Leagues club voted almost unanimously for an amalgamation to take place. Once ratified by office of Liquor and Gaming, Balmain Leagues Club ceased to exist.

=== Former clubs ===
==== Wests Campbelltown ====
Wests League Club is located in Leumeah, next door to Campbelltown Stadium, one of the Wests Tigers home grounds. Wests Campbelltown League Club was established in 1987 when Wests Ashfield Leagues purchased the former Campbelltown City Kangaroos Club.

In 1996, Wests Ashfield Leagues Club and Wests Campbelltown League Club became separate entities.

Wests Campbelltown League Club is no longer involved in the ownership of Wests Tigers having sold their 25% shares to Wests Ashfield in 2013, but remains a corporate sponsor.

=== Board of directors ===
The constitution of the football club allows for up to nine board members. On 1 December 2025, the four independent directors were removed from their roles by the majority shareholder, the Holman Barnes Group. On 10 December, most of the former board members were brought back following intervention by the NRL. The current board consists of:

- Barry O'Farrell – chair, independent director
- Annabelle Williams – independent director
- Michelle McDowell – independent director
- Stephen Montgomery
- Danny Stapleton
- Dennis Burgess
- Leo Epifania

The club secretary is Jamie Barrington (Wests Tigers Football Club CFO)

The CEO of the club is currently Shaun Mielekamp.

=== Ownership structure ===
As at 8 October 2020:

- Wests Magpies Pty Ltd own 4,000,080 of the Class A shares and 5,000,100 of the class B shares (90% of all shares)
- Balmain Tigers Rugby League Football Club Ltd own 1,000,020 of the Class A shares (10% of all shares)

Wests Magpies Pty Ltd is a jointly owned legal entity:

- Two shares are held by Western Suburbs Leagues Club Limited (aka Holman Barnes Group)
- One share is held by Western Suburbs District Rugby League Football Club Ltd (aka the Wests Magpies)

Note 1: WSDRLFC is a controlled entity of Holman Barnes Group

== Stadium or venue record ==
The Wests Tigers do not have a single home stadium but play at a number of grounds each year.

The recurrent used homes grounds have been Campbelltown Sports Stadium and Leichhardt Oval with each venue hosting five games per season. These grounds are around 50 km apart and are in Magpie and Tiger territories respectively. Other home grounds include one "home" game a year at Suncorp Stadium in Brisbane since 2019 for Magic Round.

From 2019 to 2023 Wests Tigers took their home games to the brand new Commbank Stadium. In 2024, Wests Tigers announced from 2025 to 2027 that they will play in Commbank Stadium, Campbelltown Sports Stadium, and Leichhardt Oval.

Due to new upgrades funding, construction will start for Leichhardt Oval in 2027, making it unavailable for that year. Construction to Campbelltown Sports Stadium will commence a year after. It is expected both venues will be completed for the 2029 season, and both grounds will be in use, playing 8 games at Campbelltown Sports Stadium and 4 games at Leichhardt Oval.

Previously the club has played home games at the Allianz Stadium/Sydney Football Stadium and Accor Stadium/Stadium Australia.

From 2004 until 2006, a "home game" was played at Lancaster Park against the Auckland based New Zealand Warriors. This agreement was not renewed for 2007 and in that year a game was played at Central Coast Stadium in Gosford against Melbourne Storm. In 2008, one home game was played at the Sydney Cricket Ground as part of the Centenary of Rugby League celebrations, and also one game at the Sydney Football Stadium.

In 2018, one home game was played at Mount Smart Stadium in Auckland as part of a double header at the venue. In the years from 2018 to 2024, a home game had been played at Scully Park in Tamworth.

Stadiums used by the Wests Tigers as home grounds:

=== Home Ground/Venue Record ===
Present:

- Commbank Stadium (2019–): 36 Played; 13 Wins, 23 Losses
- Campbelltown Sports Stadium (2000–): 104 Played; 40 Wins, 63 Losses, 1 Draw
- Leichhardt Oval (2000–): 106 Played; 61 Wins, 44 Losses, 1 Draw

Occasional:

- Suncorp Stadium, Brisbane (2019–): 27 Played; 11 Wins, 16 Losses

Former:

- Lancaster Park, Christchurch (2004–2006): 3 Played; 2 Wins, 1 Loss
- Scully Park, Tamworth (2018–2024): 5 Played; 1 Win, 4 Losses
- Accor Stadium (2005–2008, 2014–2018): 92 Played; 36 Wins, 56 Losses
- Sydney Cricket Ground (2008–2020): 9 Played; 3 Wins, 6 Losses
- Allianz Stadium (2009–2013): 42 Played; 16 Wins, 26 Losses

== Emblems and jerseys ==
The club's name and logo are a combination of the two partners. The uniform colours are a combination of the black and white of the Western Suburbs Magpies uniform and the black and gold from the Balmain Tigers uniform. The black and gold reaches back to the 1882 founded Balmain Rowing Club and made internationally famous by champion sculler William Beach. The Magpies' black and white emanates from the Ashfield rugby union club (a second grade district) from which the majority of its first players and officials came from at its 1908 founding at Ashfield Town Hall.

The original logo combined a modern "in your face" Tiger with a traditional Wests 'V' in the background. There is also a Magpie (taken from the Western Suburbs Logo) on both sleeves of the Jersey. In 2009, to commemorate the 10th anniversary of the joint venture, a predominantly white strip with a gold 'V' was unveiled.

Since formation, the Wests Tigers have mostly retained the same logo with subtle changes. In October 2021, Wests Tigers unveiled a simplified logo ahead of the 2022 NRL season, retaining the tiger head of previous emblems with fewer details. The rebranding is intended to make the identity more suitable to modern digital formats, and coincided with the Tigers' move to a new training and administration base.

== Supporters ==
At the end of the 2023 NRL season, the club recorded 20,003 paying members which ranked the club with the sixth highest membership base out of the nine Sydney clubs.

Some notable supporters of the club include Russell Arnold, Jimmy Barnes, Ash Barty Tim Cahill, Michael Clarke, Vic Darchinyan, Anthony Field, Dawn Fraser, Daniel Geale, Julie Goodwin, Sam Konstas, Jimmy Little, Paul Murray, Barry O'Farrell, Dominic Perrottet, Jordan Thompson, and Harry Triguboff.

== Kit sponsors and manufacturers ==
Year	Kit supplier	Major sponsor	Sternum sponsor	Upper back sponsor	Lower back sponsor	Sleeve sponsor	Shorts sponsors
2020	ISC	Brydens Lawyers	neds	neds	Allied Express	Brydens Lawyers	U Tech, Deemah Stone, MSR Services
2021	Steeden	Brydens Lawyers	neds	neds	Organica	Brydens Lawyers	Barclay Pearce Capital, PlayUp, Sharp Extensive IT
2022	Steeden	Brydens Lawyers	Organica	ELMO Software	KFC	Brydens Lawyers	Barclay Pearce Capital, PlayUp, Sharp Extensive IT
2023	Steeden	Brydens Lawyers	PlayUp	FAB Industrial Logistics	KFC	FAB Industrial Logistics	Barclay Pearce Capital, Draft Stars
2024	Steeden	Brydens Lawyers	NA	PlayUp	NA	FAB Industrial Logistics	Pama
2025	Steeden	Pepper Money	Pama	Play Up	Allied Express	Zurich	LC Wealth

=== Major partner ===
- Pepper Money

=== Premier partners ===
- PlayUp, Steeden, Allied Express, Victoria Bitter, Holman Barnes Group, Pama, Elmo, Zurich

=== Platinum partners ===
- Hertz, ISRI, Wests Campbelltown, Ticketek, McDonald's, Haymes Paint, LC Wealth, Gavmanak

=== Gold partners ===
- Binet Homes, Liverpool Catholic Club

=== Corporate partners ===
- Bradcorp, E Group, Ken Shafer Suto Body, Masterton Homes, My Property Consultants, Nova 96.9, Roosters Traffic Control, Ryde Eastwood Leagues Club, St Johns Park Bowling Club, Tharawal, Triple M, Wakeling Automotive, Momenta

=== Player's club sponsors ===
- APN Compounding, Club Menangle, Exclusive Estate Agents, Leumeah Shopping Centre, Murray Kennedy, Tidda Workforce, Ultra Building Works, Z Wealth Group, Z Realty Group, Ellis Consolidated, Mars Forklifts, Sensory Gardens Australia, Retroair, KwikFlo

== Season statistics ==
Season	Pos	Pld	W	D	L	B	F	A	+/-	Pts	Notes	Crowd*
2000	10th	26	11	2	13	N/A	519	642	−123	24	Wests Tigers 2000	12,124
2001	12th	26	9	1	16	N/A	474	746	−272	19	Wests Tigers 2001	9,287
2002	13th	24	7	0	17	2	498	642	−144	18	Wests Tigers 2002	10,478
2003	13th	24	7	0	17	2	470	598	−128	18	Wests Tigers 2003	8,993
2004	9th	24	10	0	14	2	509	534	−25	24	Wests Tigers 2004	13,935
2005	4th	24	14	0	10	2	676	575	101	32	Premiers; Wests Tigers 2005	19,998
2006	11th	24	10	0	14	2	490	565	−75	24	Wests Tigers 2006	19,357
2007	9th	24	11	0	13	1	541	561	−20	24	Wests Tigers 2007	16,766
2008	10th	24	11	0	13	2	528	560	−32	26	Wests Tigers 2008	15,930
2009	9th	24	12	0	12	2	558	483	75	28	Wests Tigers 2009	16,848
2010	3rd	24	15	0	9	2	537	503	34	34	Wests Tigers 2010	16,941
2011	4th	24	15	0	9	2	519	430	89	34	Wests Tigers 2011	17,852
2012	10th	24	11	0	13	2	506	551	−45	26	Wests Tigers 2012	16,227
2013	15th	24	7	0	17	2	386	687	−301	18	Wests Tigers 2013	10,507
2014	13th	24	10	0	14	2	420	631	−211	24	Wests Tigers 2014	13,104
2015	15th	24	8	0	16	2	487	562	−75	20	Wests Tigers 2015	11,709
2016	9th	24	11	0	13	2	499	607	−108	26	Wests Tigers 2016	15,390
2017	14th	24	7	0	17	2	413	571	−158	18	Wests Tigers 2017	13,551
2018	9th	24	12	0	12	1	377	460	−83	26	Wests Tigers 2018	17,181
2019	9th	24	11	0	13	1	475	486	−11	24	Wests Tigers 2019	13,992
2020	11th	20	7	0	13	0	440	505	−65	14	Wests Tigers 2020	2,966
2021	13th	24	8	0	16	1	500	714	−214	18	Wests Tigers 2021	9,526
2022	16th	24	4	0	20	1	352	679	−327	10	Wests Tigers 2022	11,094
2023	17th	24	4	0	20	3	385	675	−290	14	Wests Tigers 2023	11,042
2024	17th	24	6	0	18	3	463	750	−287	18	Wests Tigers 2024	12,653
2025	13th	24	9	0	15	3	477	612	−135	24	Wests Tigers 2025	15,383
2026	15th	24	8	0	16	3	445	699	−254	22	Wests Tigers 2026	15,433

* Average home crowd

== Head-to-head records ==
Opponent	Played	Won	Drawn	Lost	Win %
Sharks	40	20	1	19	50.00
Cowboys	50	25	0	25	50.00
Knights	42	19	0	23	45.24
Dragons	49	22	0	27	44.90
Raiders	48	21	0	27	43.75
Warriors	41	17	0	24	41.00
Bulldogs	47	19	0	28	40.26
Dolphins	5	2	0	3	40.00
Titans	30	12	0	18	40.00
Sea Eagles	40	16	0	24	40.00
Rabbitohs	46	18	0	28	39.13
Eels	52	19	1	32	36.54
Panthers	45	15	0	30	33.33
Storm	40	12	0	28	30.00
Roosters	41	11	0	30	26.83
Broncos	35	9	1	25	25.71

=== Finals appearances ===
3 (2005, 2010, 2011)

== 2026 squad ==
Wests Tigers 2026 squad
Top 30 squad - 2026 NRL season			Supplementary list	Coaching staff
Jahream Bula – FB; Will Craig – CE, WG; Adam Doueihi – HB; Latu Fainu – HB; Samuela Fainu – SR; Sione Fainu – PR; Mavrik Geyer – SR; Patrick Herbert – CE; Tristan Hope – HK; Royce Hunt – PR	Apisai Koroisau (c) – HK; Kit Laulili'i – LK, PR; Luke Laulili'i – WG; Jarome Luai (c) – FE; Jock Madden – HB; Heamasi Makasini – WG; Heath Mason – FB, FE; Taylan May – CE; Terrell May – PR; Kai Pearce-Paul – SR	Fonua Pole – PR; Solomone Saukuru – CE; Alex Seyfarth – SR; Jeral Skelton – WG; Tony Sukkar – SR, PR; Starford To'a – CE; Sunia Turuva – WG, FB; Alex Twal – LK, PR	Bunty Afoa – PR; Javon Andrews – FE; Lachlan Broederlow – SR; Jared Haywood – HK; Charlie Murray – LK; Ethan Roberts – SR; Extended squad: Faaletino Tavana – WG; Josese Lanyon – HK	Head coach: Benji Marshall; Assistant coaches: Brett Hodgson; Chris Heighington; John Morris; Tyrone McCarthy (NSW Cup coach); Leon Latulipe (Jersey Flegg Cup Coach); Legend: (c) Captain(s); (vc) Vice-captain(s); Updated: 20 November 2026; Source(s): Wests Tigers,

=== 2026 signings and losses ===
Signings
Player	Previous club	Contract Type	Contract ends	Notes
Bunty Afoa	New Zealand Warriors	Development	2026	
Ethan Roberts	Sydney Roosters	Development	2027	
Javon Andrews	Gold Coast Titans	Development	2028	
Jock Madden	Brisbane Broncos	Top 30 Squad	2027	
Junior Tupou	Sydney Roosters	Train & Trial	2027	Top 30 Squad in 2027
Kai Pearce-Paul	Newcastle Knights	Top 30 Squad	2028	
Mavrik Geyer	Penrith Panthers	Top 30 Squad	2027	
Patrick Herbert	Gold Coast Titans^{(2023)}	Top 30 Squad	2027	

Losses
Player	Club
Alex Lobb	Wynnum Manly Seagulls
Brent Naden	released
Brandon Tumeth	released
Charlie Staines	Catalans Dragons
Jack Bird	Leeds Rhinos
Josh Feledy	Manly-Warringah Sea Eagles
Justin Matamua	Canterbury-Bankstown Bulldogs
Luke Laulilii	New Zealand Warriors
Reuben Porter	released
Solomona Faataape	Catalans Dragons

== Statistics and records ==
Robbie Farah holds the record for most appearances for The Wests Tigers with 277. Having played in every game of the 2008, 2009, 2010 & 2011 seasons.

The highest point-scorers for the club have been players who have undertaken goalkicking duties for a period. Benji Marshall has scored the most points for the club (1181), followed by Brett Hodgson (786), and Joel Caine (526). In 2005, Hodgson scored a record 308 points during the season, the most points ever scored by a fullback in one season. In the semis of 2005, he also scored 30 points in one match against the North Queensland Cowboys.

David Nofoaluma has the most tries for the Wests Tigers, accumulating 100. Taniela Tuiaki scored a club-record 21 tries during the 2009 season.

As of the end of the 2026 season the West Tigers are the only current NRL club to hold a 100% win rate in Grand Final games. The 2005 NRL season victory over the North Queensland Cowboys (30–16), is the only current Grand Final game won by a team without a loss in the premiership decider.

== Wests Tigers "Team of the Century" ==
The Wests Tigers Team of the Century was announced in 2004, encompassing the best players from both Balmain and Western Suburbs. Nine Balmain players and eight from Western Suburbs made up the 17 members of the team.

Wests Tigers' Team of the Century
First team squad	Reserves	Coaching staff
1 Keith Barnes – FB – Balmain; 2 Peter Dimond – WG – Western Suburbs; 3 Charles Fraser – CE – Balmain; 4 Harry Wells – CE – Western Suburbs; 5 Alan Ridley – WG – Western Suburbs; 6 Vic Hey – FE – Western Suburbs; 7 Keith Holman – HB – Western Suburbs; 8 Steve Roach – PR – Balmain; 9 Ben Elias – HK – Balmain; 10 Noel Kelly – PR – Western Suburbs; 11 Paul Sironen – SR – Balmain; 12 Arthur Beetson – SR – Balmain; 13 Wayne Pearce – LK – Balmain	14 Kel O'Shea – SR – Western Suburbs; 15 Jim Craig – CE, HB – Balmain; 16 Tom Raudonikis – HB – Western Suburbs; 17 Harry Bath – SR – Balmain	Head coach: Norm "Latchem" Robinson – Balmain; Legend: (c) Captain(s); (vc) Vice-captain(s); Updated: 2004; Source(s):

== Captains ==
There have been 27 captains of the Tigers since their first season in 2000. The current captains are Apisai Koroisau and Jarome Luai.

No	Captain	Years	Games
1	Jarrod McCracken	2000	6
2	Darren Senter	2000–2004	86
3	Terry Hill	2000–2002	2
4	Craig Field	2000	2
5	John Simon	2001	2
6	Ben Galea	2001–2006	7
7	Mark O'Neill	2002–2005	19
8	Corey Pearson	2002	1
9	Scott Sattler	2004	8
10	Scott Prince	2005–2006	29
11	Brett Hodgson	2006–2008	50
12	Todd Payten	2007–2009	9
13	Robbie Farah	2007–2016, 2019	149
14	Benji Marshall	2009–2013, 2018–2020	45
15	Braith Anasta	2014	5
16	Chris Lawrence	2014–2018	14
17	Aaron Woods	2014–2017	46
18	Dene Halatau	2015–2016	8
19	Elijah Taylor	2017	1
20	Russell Packer	2018	5
21	Moses Mbye	2019–2020	32
22	James Tamou	2021–2022	38
23	Luke Brooks	2021–2023	17
24	Apisai Koroisau	2023–	68
25	John Bateman	2023–24	3
26	Jarome Luai	2025–	40
27	Alex Twal	2025–	1

== Coaches ==
There have been 11 coaches of the Tigers since their first season in 2000. The current coach is Benji Marshall.

No	Name	Seasons	Games	Wins	Draws	Losses	Win %	Premiers	Runners-up	Minor premiers	Wooden spoons	Notes
1	Wayne Pearce	2000	26	11	2	13	42.3%	—	—	—	—	—
2	Terry Lamb	2001–2002	50	16	1	33	32%	—	—	—	—	—
3	Tim Sheens	2003–2012, 2023	273	126	0	147	46.15%	2005	—	—	2023	Club's first finals appearance and premiership in 2005.
4	Mick Potter	2013–2014	48	17	0	31	35%	—	—	—	—	—
5	Jason Taylor	2015–2017	51	20	0	31	39%	—	—	—	—	Sacked mid-season
6	Andrew Webster	2017	2	0	0	2	0%	—	—	—	—	Caretaker coach
7	Ivan Cleary	2017–2018	43	18	0	25	42%	—	—	—	—	—
8	Michael Maguire	2019–2022	80	29	0	51	36.25%	—	—	—	—	Sacked mid-season
9	Brett Kimmorley	2022	12	1	0	11	8.33%	—	—	—	2022	Caretaker coach
10	Ben Gardiner	2022	1	0	0	1	0%	—	—	—	—	Caretaker coach
11	Benji Marshall	2024–Current	72	23	0	49	31.94%	—	—	—	2024	Current Coach

== Honours ==
- NRL Premiership: 1

2005

=== Pre-season/Youth ===
- Rugby League World Sevens: 1

2004

- Foundation Cup: 1

2011

- Under-20s Premiership: 1

2012

=== New South Wales Rugby League ===
- Harold Matthews Cup: 1

2022

- NSW Women's Premiership: 1

2022

== See also ==
- National Rugby League
- Balmain Tigers
- Western Suburbs Magpies
- Huddersfield Giants

== Sources ==
- Middleton, David (editor); 2008 Official Rugby League Annual; published 2009 for the National Rugby League by News Magazines, 170–180 Bourke Rd, Alexandria NSW, 2015
