= 2005 in rugby league =

The year 2005 in rugby league football centered on Australasia's 2005 NRL season and Super League X.

== January ==
- 17–19 – Leeds, England: The England national rugby union team spends three days training with newly crowned Super League champions Leeds Rhinos.

== February ==
- 4th – Leeds, England: The 2005 World Club Challenge is won by the Leeds Rhinos who defeated the Bulldogs 39–32 at Elland Road before a crowd of 37,028.
- 23rd – Sydney, Australia: Former Wests Tigers captain Jarrod McCracken wins a court case against Melbourne Storm players Stephen Kearney and Marcus Bai for the career-ending spear tackle they performed on him in 2000.

== March ==
- 23rd – Watford, England: Great Britain captain Andy Farrell signs on to play rugby union for Saracens FC.

== April ==
- 22nd – Brisbane, Australia: In the 2005 ANZAC Test Australia defeat New Zealand 32–16 at Lang Park before a crowd of 40,317.

== May ==
- 27th – Sydney, Australia: The National Rugby League announces that a new team based in Gold Coast, Queensland will be added for the 2007 NRL season.

== June ==
- 9th – New Zealand: The NZRL announces Brian McClennan as the New Zealand national team's new coach.

== July ==
- 6th – Brisbane, Australia: The third and deciding game of the 2005 State of Origin series is won 32–10 by New South Wales at Suncorp Stadium before a crowd of 52,496.
- 17th – Blackpool, England: The 2005 Northern Rail Cup competition culminates in Hull Kingston Rovers' 16–18 victory over Castleford Tigers in the final at Bloomfield Road before a crowd of 9,400.

== August ==
- 27th – Cardiff, Wales: The 2005 Challenge Cup tournament culminates in Hull FC's 25–24 defeat of Leeds Rhinos in the final at Millennium Stadium before a crowd of 74,213.

== September ==
- 21st – Sydney, Australia: The 7th annual Tom Brock Lecture, entitled The Great Fibro versus Silvertail Wars, is delivered by Roy Masters.
- 28th – Wales: The Welsh Rugby League appoint Martin Hall, 36, as coach of the Wales national rugby league team.

== October ==
- 2nd – Sydney, Australia: The 2005 NRL Grand Final is won by the Wests Tigers who defeated the North Queensland Cowboys 30–16 at Telstra Stadium before a crowd of 82,453.
- 15th – Manchester, England: The 2005 Super League Grand Final is won by the Bradford Bulls who defeated Leeds Rhinos 15–6 at Old Trafford before a crowd of 65,537.

== November ==
- 5th – Carcassonne, France: The 2005 European Nations Cup tournament culminates in France's 38–16 victory over Wales at Stade Albert Domec.
- 21st - Leeds, England: Australia's fullback Anthony Minichiello wins the 2005 RLIF Golden Boot Award as the international player of the year.
- 26th – Leeds, England: The 2005 Tri-nations series culminates in New Zealand's 24–0 victory over Australia in the final at Elland Road before a crowd of 26,534.

== December ==
- 12th – Brisbane, Australia: The Australian Rugby League announces Ricky Stuart as the replacement for Wayne Bennett, who stood down days earlier as coach of the Australian national team.
