= Heath Mason =

Australian rugby league footballer (born 2005)

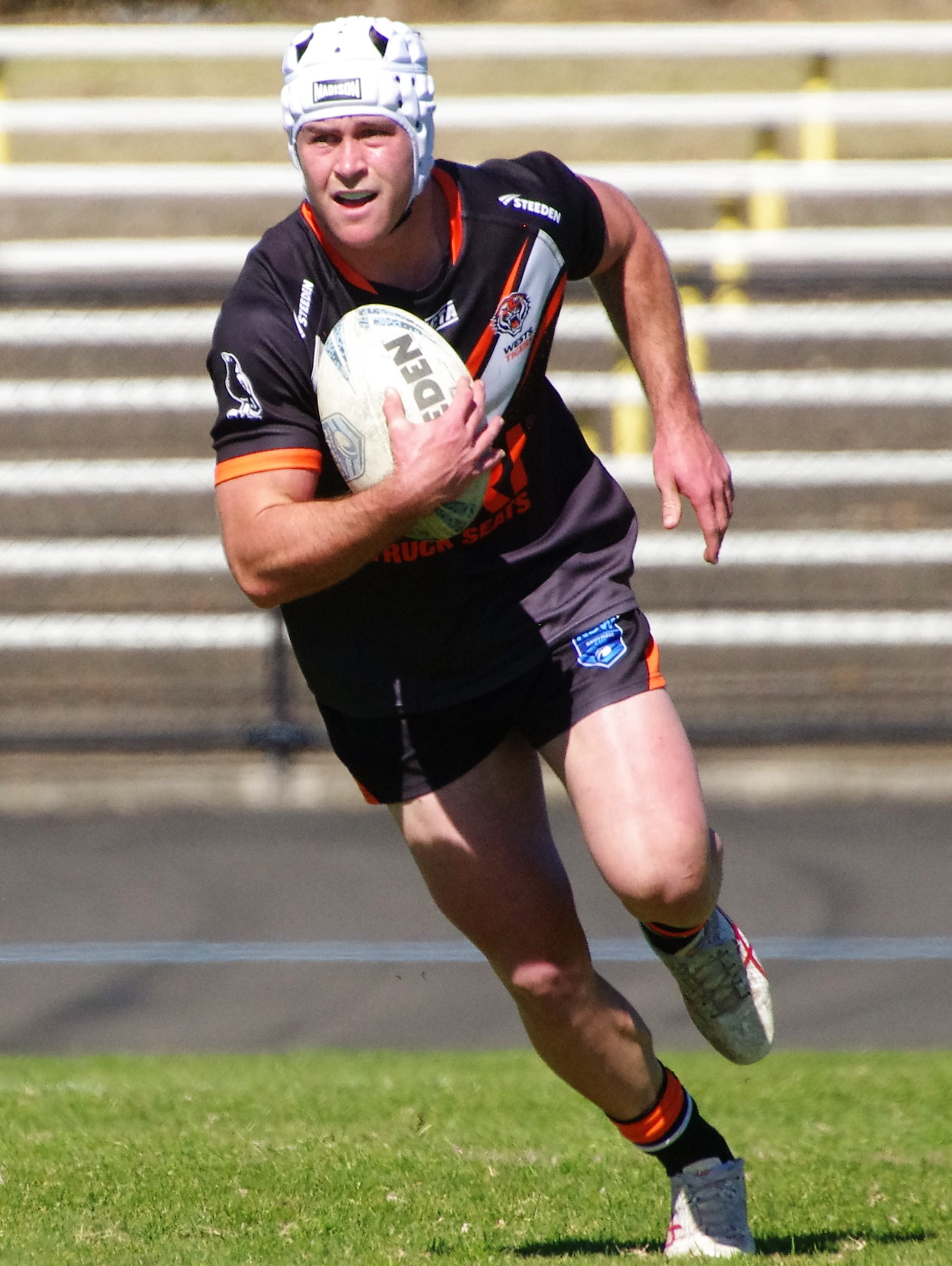

Personal information
- Full name: Heath Mason
- Born: 1 June 2005 (age 21) Bowral, New South Wales, Australia
- Height: 176 cm (5 ft 9 in)
- Weight: 88 kg (13 st 12 lb)

Playing information
- Position: Fullback, Five-eighth
Club
Years	Team	Pld	T	G	FG	P
2024–26	Wests Tigers	20	2	3	0	14
2027–	Perth Bears	0	0	0	0	0
	Total	20	2	3	0	14
- Source: As of 22 November 2026

Heath Mason (born 1 June 2005) is an Australian professional rugby league footballer who plays as a fullback for the Perth Bears in the National Rugby League.

== Background ==
Mason attended St. Gregory's college, being selected for the Australian Schoolboys team in 2023 alongside fellow Wests Tigers teammates Lachlan Galvin and Luke Laulilii. Mason signed with the Tigers until the end of 2025.

== Playing career ==
In round 15 of the 2024 NRL season, Mason made his first grade debut for the Wests Tigers against the Gold Coast Titans at Leichhardt Oval in a 18–10 win.

On 18 June 2025, Mason extended his contract with the Wests Tigers until the end of the 2026 season. Mason played seven games for the Wests Tigers in the 2025 NRL season as the club finished 13th on the table. Mason was limited to just five games for the Wests Tigers in the 2026 NRL season as the club finished 15th on the table.

On 10 November 2026, the Perth Bears announced that they had signed Mason for the 2027 season on a 1-year development contract.

== Statistics ==
Year	Team	Games	Tries	Goals	Pts
2024	Wests Tigers	7	1	1	6
2025	Wests Tigers	7	1		4
2026	Wests Tigers	5		2	4
2027	Perth Bears				
	Totals	20	2	3	14
