= Charlie Murray (rugby league) =

Australian rugby league footballer

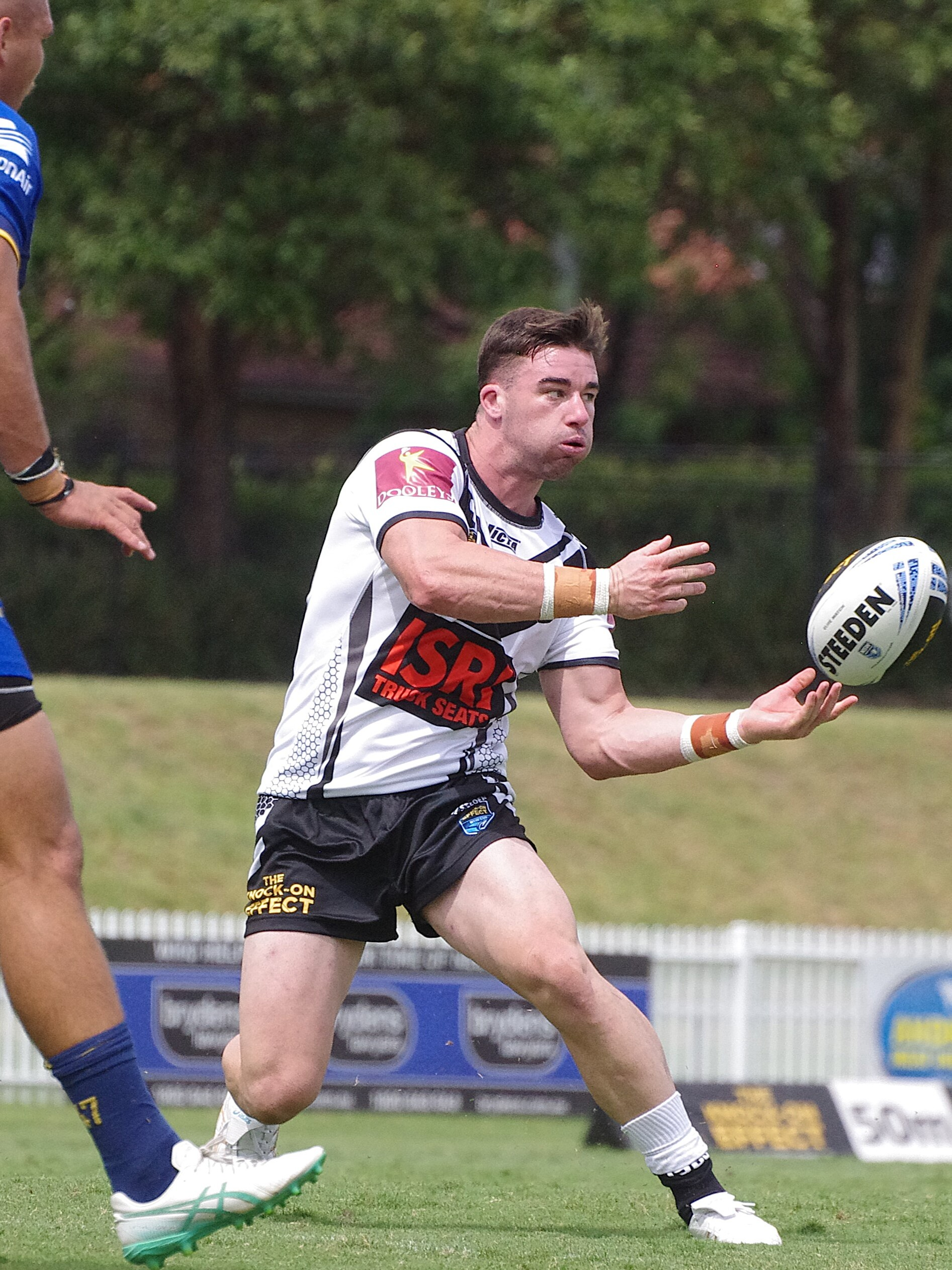

Personal information
- Full name: Charlie Murray
- Born: 17 August 2001 (age 25) Narromine, New South Wales, Australia
- Height: 183 cm (6 ft 0 in)
- Weight: 96 kg (15 st 2 lb)

Playing information
- Position: Lock
Club
| Years | Team | Pld | T | G | FG | P |
|---|---|---|---|---|---|---|
| 2025– | Wests Tigers | 7 | 0 | 0 | 0 | 0 |
- Source: As of 22 November 2026

Charlie Murray (born 17 August 2001) is an Australian professional rugby league footballer who plays as a lock for the Wests Tigers in the National Rugby League and Western Suburbs Magpies in NSW Cup.

== Background ==
Murray attended Marymount College and played for the Currumbin Eagles before being signed by the Gold Coast Titans to be a part of their pathway squad. Murray featured for Gold Coast feeder squad Tweed Heads Seagulls in QLD Cup in 2021. Murray then moved to the Melbourne Storm where he played for their feeder club the Brisbane Tigers. Murray left Melbourne to play for the Burleigh Bears in 2023.

== Career ==
In 2025, Murray signed a train and trial deal with the Wests Tigers. In round 14 2025, Murray made his NRL debut for the Tigers against the Penrith Panthers, coming off the bench in a 14-10 loss at Commbank Stadium.

On 18 July 2025, the Tigers announced that Murray had signed on for the 2026 season on a development deal.
