= Pepper Money =

Australian consumer finance company

- Type: Public
- Traded as: ASX: PPM
- Industry: Financial Services
- Founded: 2000
- Headquarters: North Sydney, New South Wales, Australia
- Area served: Australia
- Products: Home loans Car Loans; Personal Loans
- Number of employees: 2130
- Website: www.peppermoney.com.au

Pepper Money Limited, known as Pepper Money, is a consumer finance company that specialises in consumer lending and residential mortgages. It is part of Pepper Financial Services Group, which has offices in Ireland, Spain, South Korea and the United Kingdom.

== History ==
Pepper Money was founded in 2000 and is headquartered in North Sydney, New South Wales, Australia.

Between 2006 and 2010 Pepper was operated by Merrill Lynch. In July 2015, Pepper listed on the Australian Securities Exchange (ASX) with a market capitalization of A$470 million, which increased to $600 million in the first day of trading.

Pepper Money was acquired by KKR for $657 million in November 2017 and was delisted from the ASX. In 2017 it partnered with Pollenizer to back SmallStash a fintech start-up that aimed to focus on financial education for kids and assisting parents to better educate their children on money and savings.

On 25 May 2021, Pepper was relisted on the ASX and has around 2000 employees worldwide.

== Sponsorship ==
Pepper has sponsored the St Kilda Football Club since 2015, and previously sponsored the Western Sydney Wanderers Football Club between 2013 and 2018.

Pepper Money was the principal sponsor of the Illawarra Hawks NBL team for the 2021 season.

== See also ==
- List of banks in South Korea
