= Tristan Hope =

Australian rugby league footballer

Personal information
- Full name: Tristan Hope
- Born: 16 May 1997 (age 29) Toowoomba, Queensland, Australia
- Height: 177 cm (5 ft 10 in)
- Weight: 90 kg (14 st 2 lb)

Playing information
- Position: Hooker
Club
Years	Team	Pld	T	G	FG	P
2025–26	Wests Tigers	10	0	0	0	0
- Source: As of 5 November 2026

Tristan Hope (born 16 May 1997) is an Australian rugby league footballer who last played at hooker for the Wests Tigers in the National Rugby League.

== Playing career ==
In 2017, Hope played in the Brisbane Broncos Under 20s squad.

In 2019, Hope was named and played for the XXXX Queensland Rangers team.

=== 2022 ===
In late 2022 Hope had signed a two-year contract to play for the Brisbane Tigers in the Hostplus Cup in the QRL.

=== 2024 ===
Hope played for the Brisbane Tigers in the Queensland Cup. On 21 August, the Wests Tigers announced seven signings with Hope announced to have signed on for the 2025 season.

=== 2025 ===
On 11 February, Hope was named in the pre-season challenge match against the Canterbury-Bankstown Bulldogs. On 4 March, the Tigers announced that they had upgraded Hope's contract to a development deal after he had been signed in 2024 to a train and trial contract, Hope had then been named by coach Benji Marshall for the Wests Tigers opening round match against the Newcastle Knights. Hope later said when joining the Wests Tigers that he was ready to retire before the club gave him the opportunity to join on a train and trial basis.

On 18 July, the Wests Tigers announced that Hope had extended his contract for the 2026 season and was elevated into the squads top 30.

=== 2026 ===
Hope played five matches for the Wests Tigers in the 2026 NRL season as the club finished 15th on the table. On 30 October 2026, the Tigers confirmed Hope was one of eight departures from the club. It was announced by the Brisbane Tigers that Hope had re-joined the team for the 2027 season.

== Statistics ==
Year	Team	Games	Tries	Pts
2025	Wests Tigers	5		
2026	Wests Tigers	5		
	Totals	10		
