= Solomona Faataape =

Australian rugby league footballer

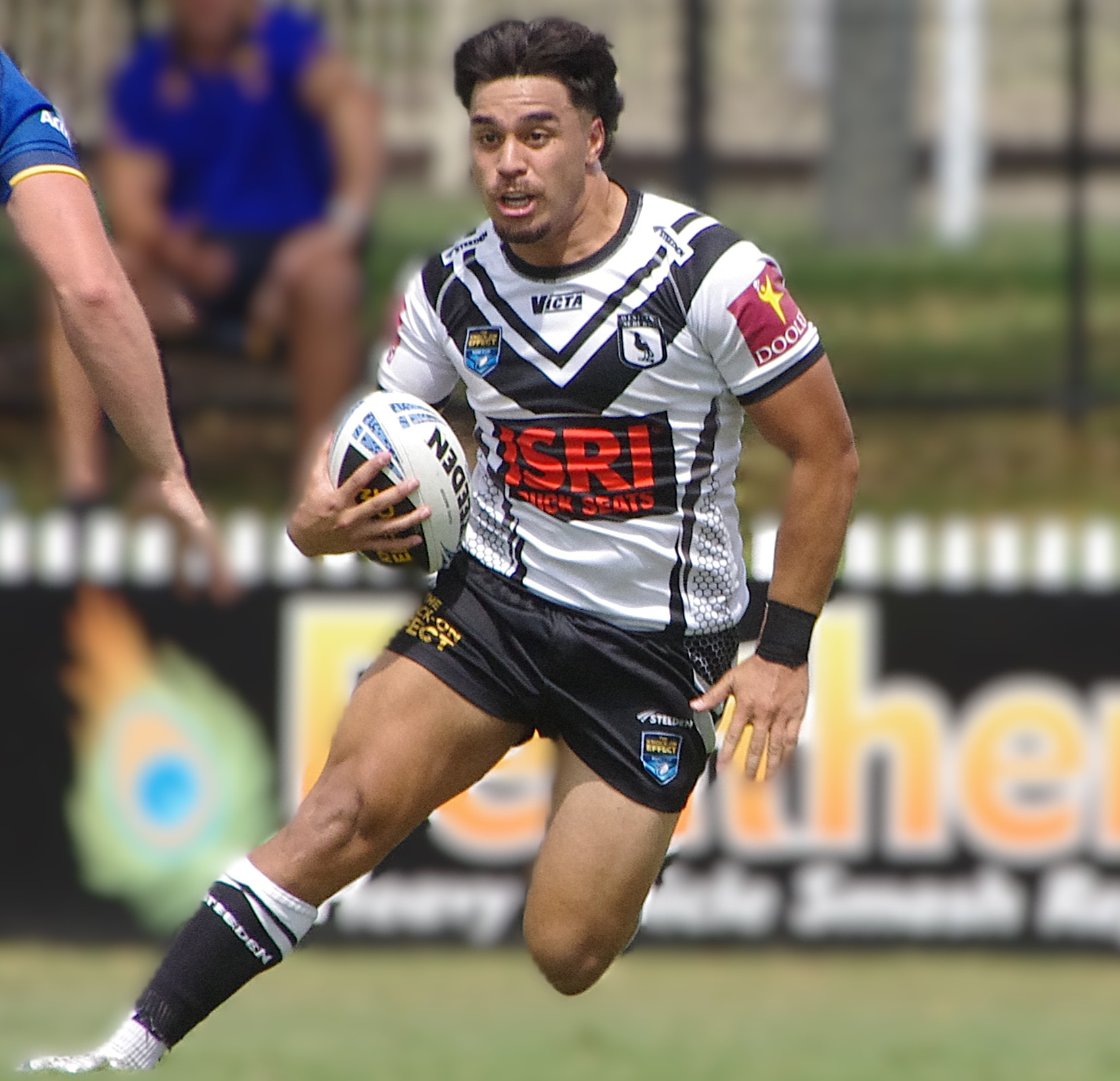

Personal information
- Full name: Solomona Fa'ataape
- Born: 25 December 2000 (age 25) Logan, Queensland, Australia
- Height: 5 ft 10 in (1.79 m)
- Weight: 16 st 3 lb (103 kg)

Playing information
- Position: Centre, Wing
Club
Years	Team	Pld	T	G	FG	P
2024–25	Wests Tigers	19	7	0	0	28
2026	Catalans Dragons	23	9	0	0	36
2027–	St Helens	0	0	0	0	0
	Total	42	16	0	0	64
- Source: As of 19 September 2026

Solomona Faataape (born 25 December 2000) is an Australian professional rugby league footballer who plays as a centre for the St Helens in the Super League.

== Playing career ==
In round 2 of the 2024 NRL season, Faataape made his first grade debut for the Wests Tigers in their 32-12 loss against Canberra. In round 5, Faataape scored two tries in Wests 26-16 loss against the Dolphins. He played 17 games for the club and scored six tries in his debut season as the Wests Tigers finished with the Wooden Spoon for a third straight season.

Faataape re-signed with the Tigers until the end of the 2025 season.

=== 2025 ===
On 2 April 2025, the Wests Tigers announced that Faataape had been elevated into the clubs top 30 squad for the rest of the season. On 24 July, Faataape confirmed he was leaving the Tigers at the end of the season. On 27 July, the Catalans Dragons confirmed that they had signed Faataape on a two-year deal.

=== 2026 ===
Faataape made his club debut for Catalans in round 3 of the 2026 Challenge Cup against Batley which Catalans won 56-4.

On 11 August, Faatappe signed a two-year deal to join St Helens starting in 2027.
