= Jahream Bula =

Fiji international rugby league footballer

Jahream Bula-Okesene
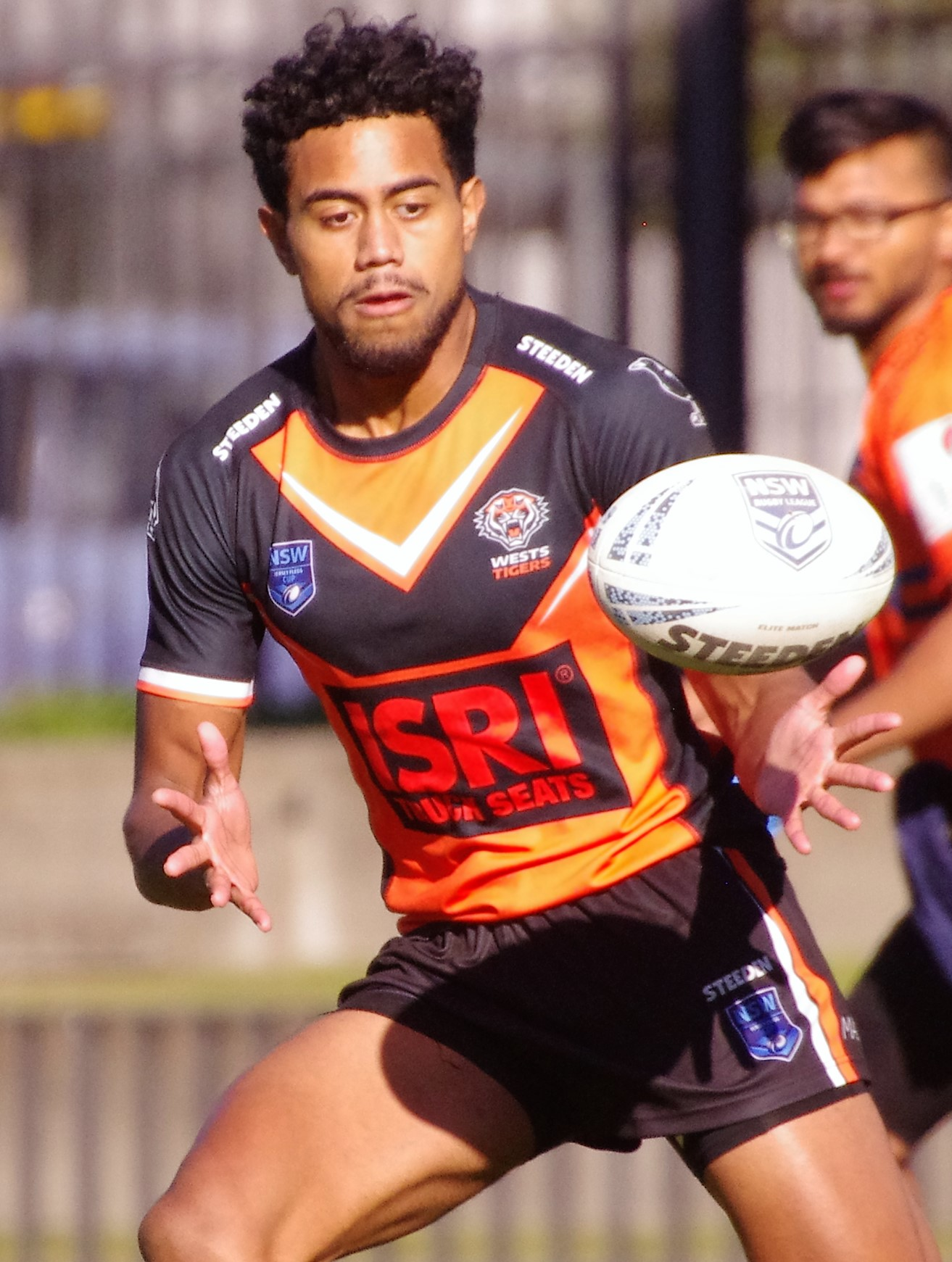

Personal information
- Full name: Jahream Jordan Bula-Okesene
- Born: 30 January 2002 (age 24) Auckland, New Zealand
- Height: 187 cm (6 ft 2 in)
- Weight: 93 kg (14 st 9 lb)

Playing information
- Position: Fullback
Club
Years	Team	Pld	T	G	FG	P
2023–	Wests Tigers	78	29	0	0	112
Representative
Years	Team	Pld	T	G	FG	P
2023–	Fiji	5	5	0	0	20
- Source: As of 6 September 2026

Jahream Jordan Bula-Okesene (born 30 January 2002) is a Fiji international rugby league footballer who plays as a fullback for the Wests Tigers in the National Rugby League.

== Background ==
Bula was born in Auckland, New Zealand. He is of Fijian, Indigenous Australian and Samoan descent. Bula relocated to Australia when he was 13, attending renowned rugby league nursery Keebra Park High, and playing for the Runaway Bay Seagulls.

== Career ==
=== 2023 ===
Bula was named to make his debut on 22 April, with coach Tim Sheens saying, "He's athletic, he plays the position well, he's only young but a good kid. I just want him to play his natural game. I don’t expect him to win us the game, I just want him to do his job." Starting at fullback, Bula was among those who were awarded Dally M points as one of the best players in the game. In round 20 of the 2023 NRL season, Bula scored two tries for the Wests Tigers in their 18–34 loss against Newcastle. Bula played a total of 18 games for the Wests Tigers in the 2023 NRL season as the club finished with the wooden spoon for a second straight year. On 20 September 2023. Wests Tigers announced the upgraded extension of Bula's contract to end of 2027 for a reported $2.7M.

=== 2024 ===
In round 3 of the 2024 NRL season, Bula scored two tries for the Wests Tigers in their 32–6 victory over Cronulla, and in round 22, Bula scored two more in the Tigers' 48–30 loss against North Queensland. Bula played 21 games for the Wests Tigers and scored ten tries as the club finished with the wooden spoon for a third consecutive year.

=== 2025 ===
Bula played a total of 18 matches for the Wests Tigers in the 2025 NRL season as the club finished 13th on the table.

He scored 4 tries for Fiji in their Pacific Championship Bowl 48–24 win over Cook Islands in Port Moresby.

=== 2026 ===
On 5 May, the Wests Tigers announced that Bula had re-signed with the club until the end of 2030. Bula played 20 games for the Wests Tigers in the 2026 NRL season as the club finished 15th on the table.

== Statistics ==
Year	Team	Games	Tries	Pts
2023	Wests Tigers	18	5	20
2024	Wests Tigers	21	10	40
2025	Wests Tigers	18	8	32
2026	Wests Tigers	13	6	24
	Totals	70	29	112
