= Alex Lobb =

Australian rugby league footballer

Personal information
- Full name: Alexander Lobb
- Born: 2 January 2002 (age 24) Wollongong, New South Wales, Australia
- Height: 196 cm (6 ft 5 in)
- Weight: 101 kg (15 st 13 lb)

Playing information
- Position: Wing
Club
Years	Team	Pld	T	G	FG	P
2024	Wests Tigers	3	1	0	0	4
- Source: As of 22 July 2025

Alex Lobb (born 2 January 2002) is an Australian professional rugby league footballer who last played as a winger for the Wests Tigers in the National Rugby League (NRL).

== Background ==
Lobb was born in Wollongong, New South Wales. He played his junior footy with the Western Suburbs Red Devils, progressing through the St George Illawarra Dragons' SG Ball and Jersey Flegg systems before moving to the Tigers ahead of the 2024 season.

== Playing career ==
=== 2024 ===
Lobb joined the Wests Tigers development squad and featured in the 2024 Knock-On Effect NSW Cup for the Western Suburbs Magpies, scoring six tries in 25 appearances.

He made his NRL debut during Indigenous Round in Round 12 of the 2024 season, coming on as the 18th man against the North Queensland Cowboys. In his first two NRL games, he scored a try and is noted for his aerial ability and goal-kicking background.

=== 2026 ===
For the 2026 season, Lobb signed on with Queensland Cup team, the Wynnum Manly Seagulls, feeder club for the Brisbane Broncos.
