= Apisai Koroisau =

Fiji international rugby league footballer

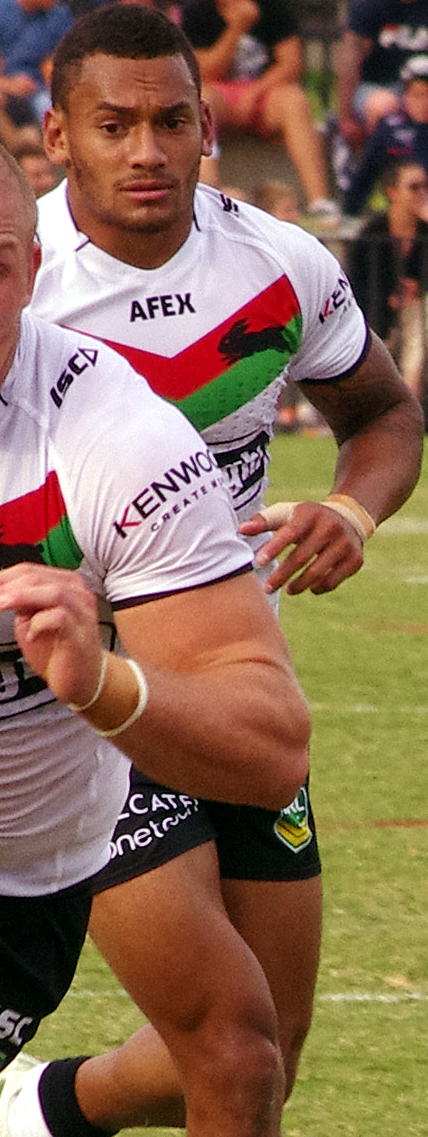

Personal information
- Full name: Apisai Koroisau
- Born: 7 November 1992 (age 34) Sydney, New South Wales, Australia
- Height: 172 cm (5 ft 8 in)
- Weight: 88 kg (13 st 12 lb)

Playing information
- Position: Hooker
Club
Years	Team	Pld	T	G	FG	P
2014	South Sydney	14	1	0	0	4
2015	Penrith Panthers	16	1	4	0	12
2016–19	Manly Sea Eagles	77	11	2	0	48
2020–22	Penrith Panthers	63	11	0	0	44
2023–	Wests Tigers	84	17	80	0	228
	Total	254	41	86	0	336
Representative
Years	Team	Pld	T	G	FG	P
2013–	Fiji	20	1	21	0	46
2017	Prime Minister's XIII	1	0	0	0	0
2019	Fiji 9s	3	0	3	0	6
2021–23	New South Wales	4	2	0	0	8
- Source: As of 22 November 2026
- Relatives: Sunia Turuva (cousin)

Apisai Koroisau (born 7 November 1992) is a Fijian international rugby league footballer who plays as a hooker and is the captain of the Wests Tigers in the National Rugby League (NRL).

A triple NRL premiership winner with the South Sydney Rabbitohs (2014) and the Penrith Panthers (2021 and 2022), he previously played for the Manly Sea Eagles in the NRL.

He has also represented New South Wales in the State of Origin series.

== Background ==
Koroisau was born in Sydney, New South Wales, Australia and is of Fijian descent. He played his junior football for the Berala Bears, before being signed by the South Sydney Rabbitohs. He is the cousin of Sunia Turuva.

== Playing career ==
=== Early career ===
Koroisau played for the South Sydney Rabbitohs NYC U20s team in 2011 and 2012.

=== 2013 ===
Koroisau played for the North Sydney Bears (Souths' feeder) in the New South Wales Cup. He made a total of 25 appearances and scored 6 tries.

In October, Koroisau was named in the Fijian 2013 World Cup squad. He made his debut for Fiji in Round 1 of the tournament against Ireland in the 32–14 win at Spotland Stadium. Koroisau played in 4 matches in the tournament.

=== 2014 ===
In Round 4 of the 2014 NRL season, Koroisau made his NRL debut for the South Sydney Rabbitohs at hooker against the Canberra Raiders in a 30–18 loss at ANZ Stadium. In the round 8 ANZAC Day match against the Brisbane Broncos, Koroisau scored his first NRL career try, and the game's opening try, in South Sydney's last minute 28-26 penalty goal win at Suncorp Stadium. On 3 June 2014, Koroisau signed a two-year contract with the Penrith Panthers starting in 2015.

In the week leading up to Souths 2014 NRL Grand Final against the Canterbury-Bankstown Bulldogs, starting hooker Issac Luke was ruled out of the match for his high tackle on Sydney Roosters player Sonny Bill Williams. Koroisau was Luke's replacement at hooker for the match on 5 October 2014, in Souths 30-6 Grand Final victory. Koroisau was rated a 7 out of 10 player rating by Rugby League Week for his performance in the Grand Final. Koroisau finished his debut year in the NRL in 2014 season with 14 matches and one try.

=== 2015 ===
On 24 January 2015, Koroisau was named in Penrith's 2015 Auckland Nines squad. On 2 May 2015, he played for Fiji against Papua New Guinea in the 2015 Melanesian Cup. On 2 July 2015, he signed a three-year contract with the Manly-Warringah Sea Eagles starting in 2016, after being released from the final year of his Penrith contract. He finished off his first stint with the Penrith club having played in 16 matches, scoring one try and kicking four goals.

=== 2016 ===
In Round 1 of the 2016 NRL season, Koroisau made his club debut for Manly-Warringah against the Canterbury-Bankstown Bulldogs, starting at hooker in the Sea Eagles' 8–26 loss at Brookvale Oval. However, he was dropped to New South Wales Cup in favour of Matt Parcell after the Sea Eagles lost 22–36 to the Wests Tigers in Round 2 at Leichhardt Oval. He was recalled to the team for their Round 5 match against his former club South Sydney following an ankle injury that ruled out representative halfback Daly Cherry-Evans. Playing at halfback, Koroisau scored his first club try for Manly in their 12–16 loss at Brookvale Oval. Despite the loss, his performance on the night won him the Man of the Match award from match broadcaster Channel 9. He backed up his performance against the Rabbitohs when he was again one of Manly's leading players in their 34–18 away win over the New Zealand Warriors in Round 6.

=== 2017 ===
In the 2017 NRL season, Koroisau played 23 games, scored 3 tries and kicked 1 goal for Manly. He was selected in the Prime Minister's XIII in the 48–8 win over Papua New Guinea at PNG Football Stadium. Koroisau was selected in the Fiji 24-man squad in the 2017 Rugby League World Cup campaign. He played 5 matches and kicked 13 goals.

=== 2018 ===
Koroisau made 13 appearances for Manly in 2018 as the club endured a horrid season on and off the field narrowly avoiding the wooden spoon by 2 competition points.

=== 2019 ===
On 30 August, Koroisau signed a three-year deal with the Penrith Panthers that started in 2020. Koroisau made 22 appearances for Manly in the 2019 NRL season as the club qualified for the finals after finishing in sixth place. Koroisau played in the club's elimination final victory over Cronulla and also featured in Manly's elimination final loss against his former club South Sydney at ANZ Stadium.

=== 2020 ===
Koroisau played 20 games for Penrith in the 2020 NRL season as the club finished as Minor Premiers. He played in the 2020 NRL Grand Final where Penrith lost to Melbourne 26–20 at ANZ Stadium.

=== 2021 ===
Koroisau was selected as 18th man in the NSW Blues State of Origin team for the 2021 series. Following injuries to halves Nathan Cleary and Jarome Luai ahead of game three of the series, Koroisau made his debut for New South Wales in the number 14 jersey. scoring a try in the 20–18 loss, however New South Wales had already clinched the series by winning the first two games 50-6 and 26-0 respectively.

On 22 July, Koroisau was placed under investigation by the NRL after allegations were made that he invited a woman into the NSW Blues bubble during the series, against strict biosecurity regulations. He was alleged to have snuck the woman in on two occasions, with the second coming on the day of Game Two on 27 June. The following day, he was fined $35,000 and suspended for two matches over the incident. It was also revealed the woman he brought back to the hotel was not his wife. On 4 August 2021, he was fined an additional $15,000 by the NSWRL over the incident.

Koroisau played a total of 18 games for Penrith in the 2021 including the club's 2021 NRL Grand Final victory over South Sydney. It was his second premiership as a player.

On 2 December, he signed a two-year deal with the Wests Tigers starting in the 2023 season.

=== 2022 ===
Koroisau played 25 games for Penrith in the 2022 NRL season including the clubs 2022 NRL Grand Final victory over Parramatta. The following day, Koroisau said of his new club the Wests Tigers at the club's fan day, "There’s so much young talent. To go out on a high like that, it's pretty incredible, and I'll probably do the same thing at the Tigers." he added, before breaking into hysterics.

=== 2023 ===
On 22 May, Koroisau was selected by New South Wales for game one of the 2023 State of Origin series. On Thursday the 8th of June In round 15 of the 2023 NRL season, Koroisau suffered a broken jaw in the clubs loss against the Gold Coast and was ruled out for an indefinite period. In round 25, Koroisau kicked a goal from the side line with less than three minutes remaining to win the game for the Wests Tigers 24-23. The victory broke a ten-game losing streak for the club and also ensured they avoided the wooden spoon for another week. Koroisau played a total of 21 games for the Wests Tigers in the 2023 NRL season as the club finished with the wooden spoon for a second straight year.

=== 2024 ===
Koroisau played 22 games for the Wests Tigers in the 2024 NRL season as the club finished with the wooden spoon for a third straight year.

"Api's always facing one way, [then goes] down the other. Just his little subtle movements where he'll be facing right, pick up a ball, have a little show, just have a little look out there, just move his hips a little bit, then come back the other way."

— −Cameron Smith

=== 2025 ===
On 22 January. Koroisau was named co-captain of the Wests Tigers for the 2025 season alongside Jarome Luai. In April, a number of senior players including Luai and Koroisau had asked team boss Shane Richardson about Lachlan Galvin and said that they did not want him in the team. Galvin had issues with being "second fiddle" to the four time premiership winning playmaker and that he had "no faith" in Benji Marshall's coaching. On 22 July, the Wests Tigers announced that Koroisau had penned an extension with the club for a further three years. He played a total of 22 games for the Wests Tigers in the 2025 NRL season as the club finished 13th on the table.

=== 2026 ===
Koroisau played 18 games for the Wests Tigers in the 2026 NRL season as the club finished 15th on the table.

== Statistics ==
Year	Team	Games	Tries	Goals	Pts
2014	South Sydney Rabbitohs	14	1		4
2015	Penrith Panthers	16	1	4	12
2016	Manly Warringah Sea Eagles	18	3	1	14
2017	Manly Warringah Sea Eagles	24	3	1	14
2018	Manly Warringah Sea Eagles	13	3		12
2019	Manly Warringah Sea Eagles	22	2		8
2020	Penrith Panthers	20	3		12
2021	Penrith Panthers	18	3		12
2022	Penrith Panthers	25	5		20
2023	Wests Tigers	21	6	18	60
2024	Wests Tigers	22	5	43	106
2025	Wests Tigers	22	3	16	44
2026	Wests Tigers	19	3	3	18
2027	Wests Tigers				
	Totals	254	41	86	336

source;

*denotes season competing
