= Alex Seyfarth =

Australian rugby league player

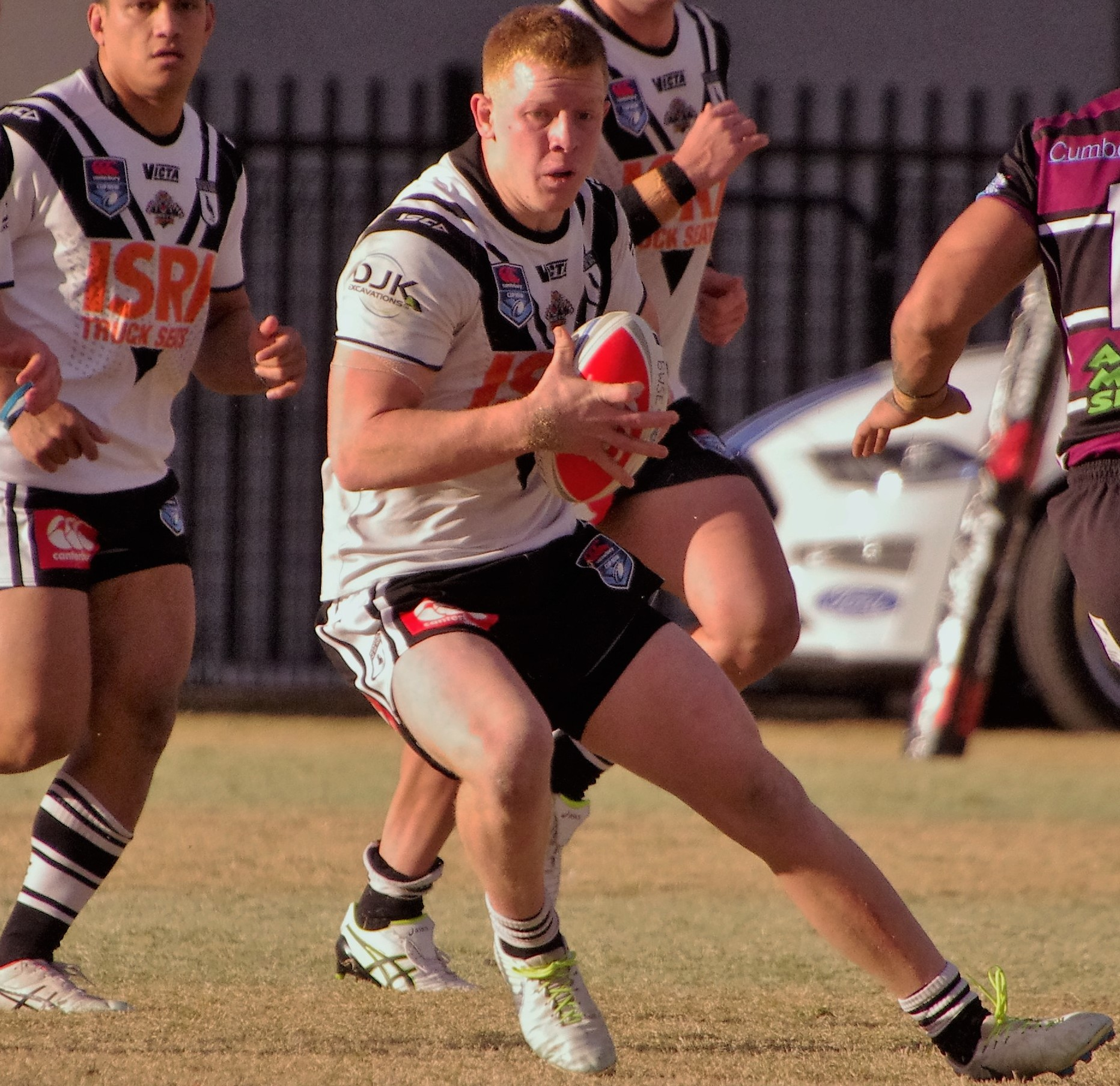

Personal information
- Born: 20 January 1999 (age 27) Sydney, New South Wales, Australia
- Height: 191 cm (6 ft 3 in)
- Weight: 105 kg (16 st 7 lb)

Playing information
- Position: Second-row
Club
Years	Team	Pld	T	G	FG	P
2020–	Wests Tigers	114	12	0	0	48
Representative
Years	Team	Pld	T	G	FG	P
2024	Prime Minister's XIII	1	0	0	0	0
- Source: 6 September 2026

Alex Seyfarth (born 20 January 1999) is an Australian professional rugby league footballer who plays as a second-row forward for the Wests Tigers in the National Rugby League.

Seyfarth made his NRL debut in 2020.

== Background ==
Seyfarth played his junior rugby league for the Dundas Shamrocks. Seyfarth is of Italian, Slovenian, English and Sri Lankan descent. He played in an under-10s grand final at Leichhardt Oval.

In 2017, Seyfarth joined the Wests Tigers Jersey Flegg team. He was named their best player in 2018, going on to play for the New South Wales under-18s team. The next year, he progressed to NSW's under-20s team.

== Playing career ==
=== 2020 ===
Seyfarth made his debut in round 3 of the 2020 NRL season for the Wests Tigers against the Cronulla-Sutherland Sharks following the resumption of the sport due to the COVID-19 pandemic.

Seyfarth (right) with teammate Aidan Sezer

=== 2021 ===
On 27 July, it was announced that Seyfarth would be ruled out for an indefinite period after suffering a MCL injury. Seyfarth played a total of 12 games for the Wests Tigers in the 2021 NRL season as the club finished 13th and missed the finals.

=== 2022 ===
Seyfarth played a total of 17 matches for the Wests Tigers in the 2022 NRL season as the club finished bottom of the table and claimed the wooden spoon for the first time.

=== 2023 ===
Seyfarth played a total of 14 games for the Wests Tigers in the 2023 NRL season as the club finished with the wooden spoon for a second straight year. At season's end, he remained without a contract and was linked to the Canterbury-Bankstown Bulldogs before re-signing with Wests for a further two seasons.

=== 2024 ===
Seyfarth played 23 games for the Wests Tigers throughout the 2024 NRL season as the club finished with the Wooden Spoon for a third consecutive year.

=== 2025 ===
On 14 February, Wests announced that Seyfarth had signed a three-year extension with the club.

=== 2026 ===
Seyfarth played every match for the Wests Tigers in the 2026 NRL season as the club finished 15th on the table.

== Statistics ==
Year	Team	Games	Tries	Pts
2020	Wests Tigers	4		
2021	Wests Tigers	12	1	4
2022	Wests Tigers	17		
2023	Wests Tigers	14	1	4
2024	Wests Tigers	23	4	16
2025	Wests Tigers	21	4	16
2026	Wests Tigers	23	2	8
	Totals	114	12	48
