= Brandon Tumeth =

Australian rugby league player

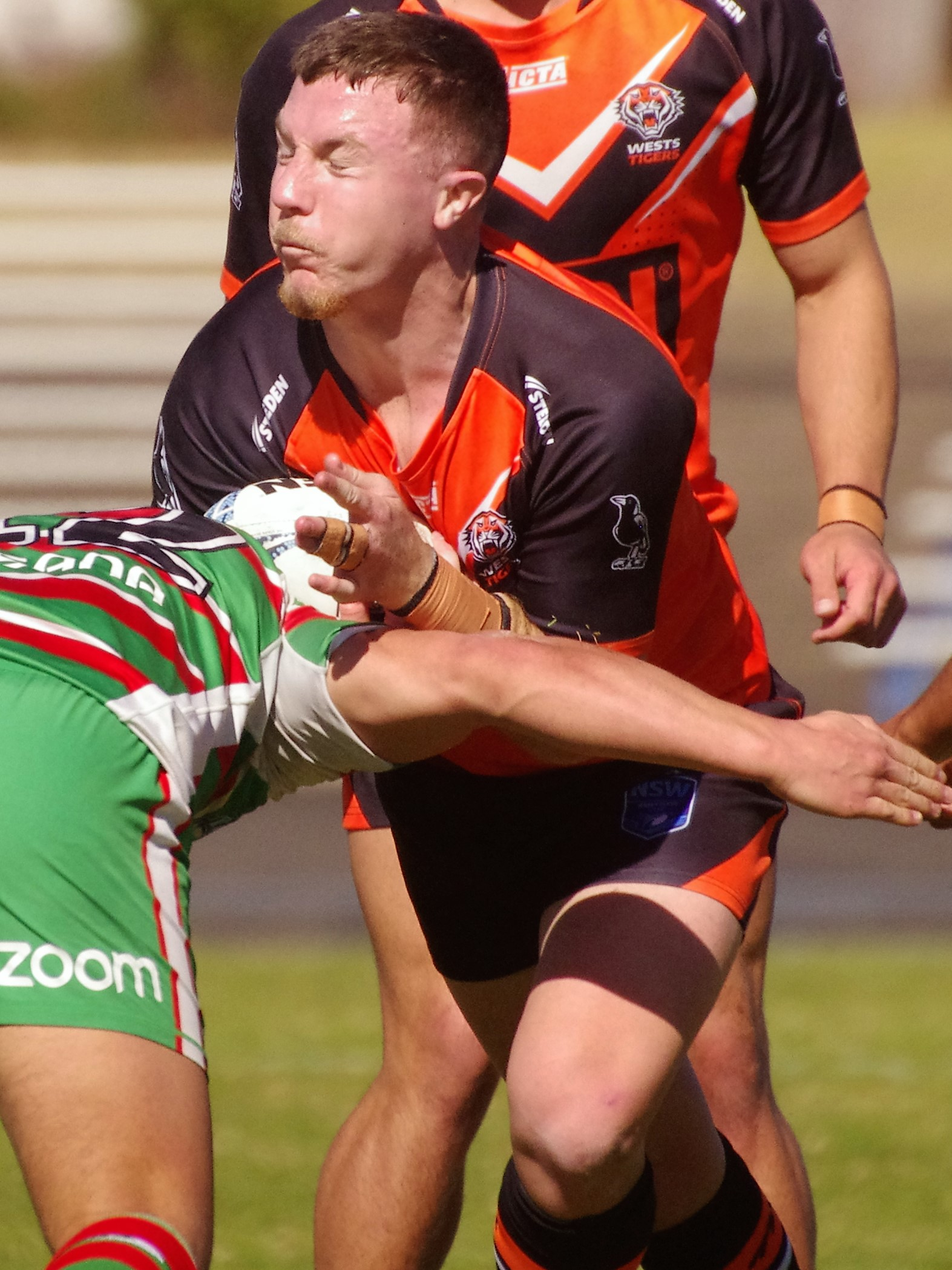

Personal information
- Full name: Brandon Tumeth
- Born: 20 April 2003 (age 22) Sydney, New South Wales, Australia
- Height: 183 cm (6 ft 0 in)
- Weight: 97 kg (15 st 4 lb)

Playing information
- Position: Second-row
Club
Years	Team	Pld	T	G	FG	P
2023	Wests Tigers	1	0	0	0	0

Brandon Tumeth (/ˈtjuːməθ/ TEW-məth; born 20 April 2003) is an Australian rugby league footballer who last played as a second-row forward for the Wests Tigers in the National Rugby League (NRL).

== Background ==
Tumeth played his junior rugby league for the Concord-Burwood Wolves. He also played for Holy Cross in the NRL Schoolboys Cup.

After playing in the junior representative competitions with the Balmain Tigers as captain of the S. G. Ball Cup team in 2021, he would represent City in an Under 18s representative match against Country in 2021.

== Playing career ==
Tumeth was signed by the Wests Tigers in 2021, He played for New South Wales in the Under 19s State of Origin match in June 2022, and was added to the Future Blues camp at the end of the 2022 season.

He made his first grade debut for the Wests Tigers in his side's 14–12 loss to the Newcastle Knights at Leichhardt Oval in round 2 of the 2023 NRL season.

On 30 September 2025, the Wests Tigers announced that Tumeth was one of six players to depart the club at the end of the season.
