= Luke Laulilii =

Australian rugby league footballer (born 2005)

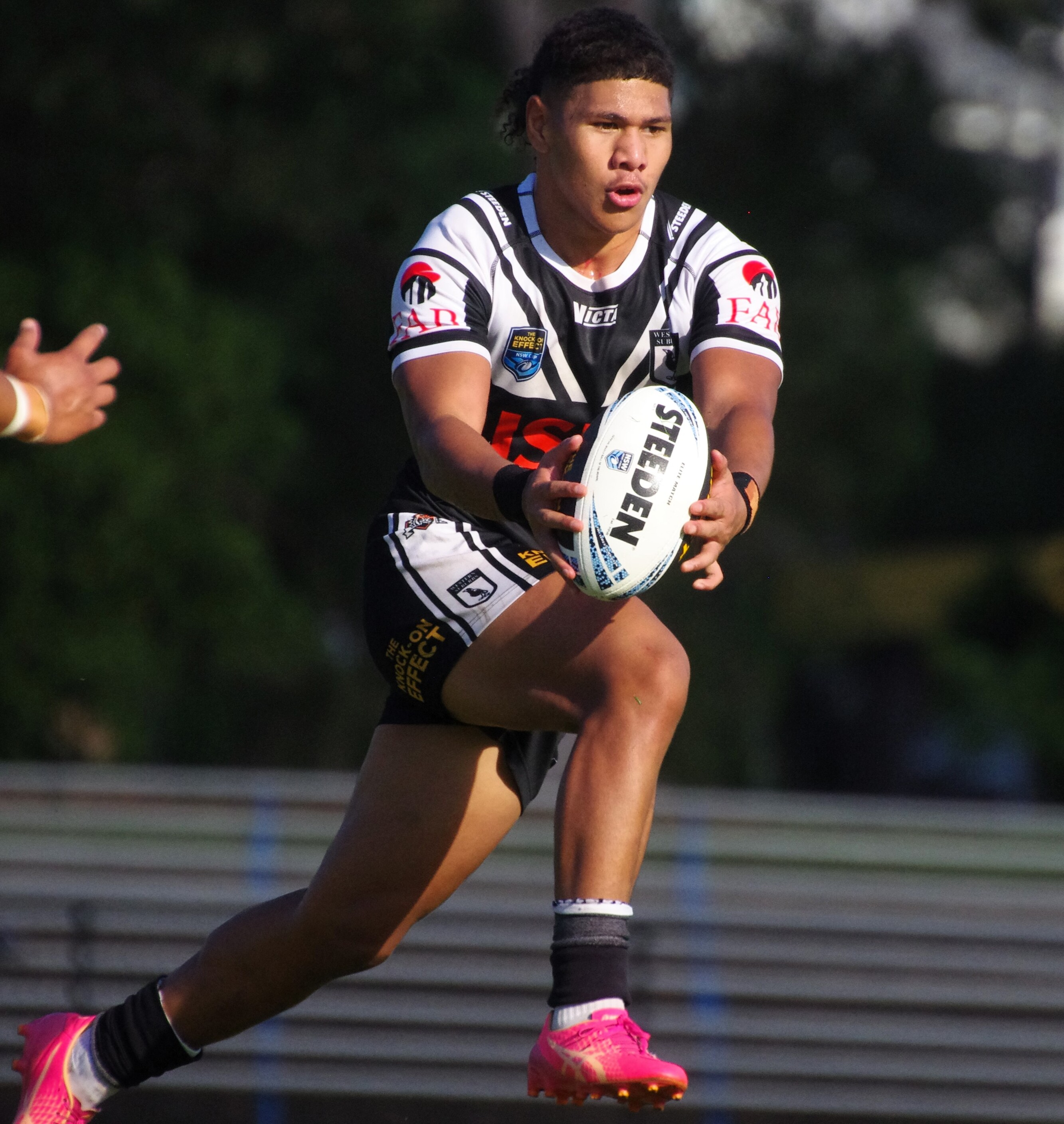

Personal information
- Full name: Luke Laulili'i
- Born: 13 June 2006 (age 20) Campbelltown, New South Wales, Australia
- Height: 175 cm (5 ft 9 in)
- Weight: 90 kg (14 st 2 lb)

Playing information
- Position: Wing, Centre
Club
Years	Team	Pld	T	G	FG	P
2024–26	Wests Tigers	17	10	0	0	40
2026	New Zealand Warriors	1	0	0	0	0
2027–	Perth Bears	0	0	0	0	0
	Total	18	10	0	0	40
- Source: As of 6 November 2026

Luke Laulilii (born 13 June 2006) is an Australian professional rugby league footballer who plays as a winger for the Perth Bears in the National Rugby League.

== Background ==
Born and raised in Campbelltown, New South Wales, Australia, Laulilii attended Westsfields Sports High School and played football as a Liverpool Catholic Club junior.

== Early career ==
Laulilii was selected for the City Origin U16s and 18s teams in 2022 and 2024, representing the Western Suburbs Magpies.

He is of Samoan descent, and expressed interest in representing Samoa at the 2026 Rugby League World Cup.

Laulilii was a part of the 2022 Harold Matthews winning squad. In 2023, he was selected for the Australian Schoolboys team. He and his brother Kit were part of the Wests Tigers junior system, playing for the Western Suburbs Magpies. After starting 2024 in the NSW cup for the Magpies, Laulilii was promoted to a top 30 contract with the Wests Tigers until the end of 2026.

== Career ==
In round 16 of the 2024 NRL season, Laulilii made his NRL debut for the Wests Tigers against the Canberra Raiders at Campbelltown Stadium in a 42–24 win, scoring a try on debut. He played five games in his rookie season, scoring two tries.

Laulilii made his first appearance of the 2025 NRL season against the Brisbane Broncos at Suncorp Stadium in a 46-24 loss, scoring a try. He was named on the wing against the Parramatta Eels, for the annual Easter Monday clash between the two clubs at Commbank Stadium, scoring a try in a 38-22 loss. Laulilii was selected on the wing for the NSW U19s State of Origin team.

On 17 January 2026, it was announced that Laulilii had signed a contract with the Perth Bears from 2027. On 30 June, he was released from the reminder of his contract, and joined another team for the rest of the season. On the same day, the Warriors announced that Laulilii had signed with them for the rest of the season.
