= 2022 Parramatta Eels season =

Australia Rugby League Parramatta Eels 2022 season

- NRL Rank: 4th
- Play-off result: Runners-up (Lost 12–28 vs Penrith Panthers, Grand Final)
- World Club Challenge: DNQ
- 2022 record: Wins: 16; draws: 0; losses: 8
- Points scored: For: 608; against: 489

Team information
- CEO: Jim Sarantinos
- Coach: (Australia) Brad Arthur
- Captain: (Australia) Clinton Gutherson (Samoa) Junior Paulo
- Stadium: CommBank Stadium (Capacity: 30,000); TIO Stadium (Capacity: 12,500)
- Avg. attendance: 20,015 (Home); 19,966 (Home & Away); 39,696 (Finals Series)
- Agg. attendance: 240,185 (Home); 479,180 (Home & Away); 158,784 (Finals Series)
- High attendance: 29,134 (16 September vs Canberra Raiders, 1st Semi-final)
← 2021	List of seasons	2023 →

The 2022 Parramatta Eels season was the 76th in the club's history. Coached by Brad Arthur and co-captained by Clinton Gutherson and Junior Paulo, they competed in the NRL's 2022 Telstra Premiership.

== Summary ==
Parramatta finished the 2022 regular season in fourth place. The season saw a club record membership tally of 34,264. Along the way, the club defeated Penrith the defending premiers twice, the first of which was a 22–20 victory at Penrith Stadium which ended their long winning streak at the ground. The club also defeated Melbourne both home and away. Although the club finished within the top four, many pundits and experts wrote off Parramatta's premiership chances. In week one of the finals, Parramatta were beaten 27-8 by Penrith with Mitchell Moses being taken off injured in the second half. The following week in the elimination final, Parramatta comfortably defeated Canberra 40–4. This would set up a preliminary final meeting against North Queensland in Townsville. Parramatta headed into the game as outsiders but pulled off one of the biggest upsets in 2022 and NRL finals history defeating North Queensland 24–20. In the 2022 NRL Grand Final, Parramatta played against fellow Western Sydney club Penrith. Parramatta would go into the half-time break 18-0 down and would eventually lose 28–12 with Clinton Gutherson and Jake Arthur scoring Parramatta's tries.

== Squad information ==
The playing squad and coaching staff of the Parramatta Eels for the 2022 NRL season.

Parramatta Eels
Top 30 squad			Extended squad	Coaching staff
(Australia) Jake Arthur – HB, FE; (Fiji) Waqa Blake – CE, WG; (New Zealand) Dylan Brown – FE, CE; (Italy) Nathan Brown – LK; (Australia) Reagan Campbell-Gillard – PR; (Australia) Bryce Cartwright – SR, LK; (New Zealand) Haze Dunster – WG; (New Zealand) Wiremu Greig – PR; (Australia) Clint Gutherson (c) – FB; (Australia) David Hollis – PR	(Samoa) Oregon Kaufusi – PR, LK; (Australia) Shaun Lane – SR; (Australia) Reed Mahoney – HK; (Cook Islands) Makahesi Makatoa – PR, LK; (Australia) Ryan Matterson – LK, SR; (Lebanon) Mitchell Moses – HB; (Fiji) Solomone Naiduki – WG; (New Zealand) Marata Niukore – SR, LK, CE; (New Zealand) Ofahiki Ogden – PR; (Australia) Tom Opacic – CE	(New Zealand) Isaiah Papali'i – SR, LK; (Samoa) Junior Paulo (c) – PR; (Tonga) Will Penisini – CE, WG; (New Zealand) Hayze Perham – CE, FB, WG; (Australia) Mitch Rein – HK; (Australia) Ky Rodwell – LK, PR; (Australia) Sean Russell – WG; (New Zealand) Bailey Simonsson – WG; (Fiji) Maika Sivo – WG; (Australia) Ray Stone – LK, SR, HK	(Australia) Zac Cini – CE, WG; (Lebanon) Elie El-Zakhem – SR; (Australia) Brendan Hands – HK, LK, FE; (Australia) Samuel Loizou (DP) – CE, WG; (Australia) Toni Mataele (DP) – SR; (Italy) Luca Moretti – SR; (Australia) Josh Tuipulotu (DP) – FB, CE	Head coach: Brad Arthur; Assistant coaches: Steve Murphy; Ryan Carr; Jordan Rankin (NSW Cup coach); Dean Feeney (Jersey Flegg coach); Paul McGregor (Coaching consultant); Michael Ennis (Coaching consultant); Legend: (c) Captain(s); (vc) Vice-captain(s); Updated: 4 October 2022; Source(s): Eels Team Profiles

== Transfers ==
In:

Nat.	Pos.	Name	From	Transfer window	Date	Ref.
(Australia)	HK	Mitch Rein	Gold Coast Titans	Pre-season	October 2021
(New Zealand)	WG	Bailey Simonsson	Canberra Raiders	Pre-season	December 2021
(Australia)	FB	Josh Tuipulotu	Youth	Pre-season	December 2021
(New Zealand)	PR	Ofahiki Ogden	Canterbury-Bankstown Bulldogs	Pre-season	February 2022

Out:

Nat.	Pos.	Name	To	Transfer window	Date	Ref.
(Australia)	WG	Blake Ferguson	Green Rockets Tokatsu (rugby union)	Pre-season	September 2021
(Australia)	HK	Joey Lussick	St Helens	Pre-season	September 2021
(Tonga)	WG	Michael Oldfield	Southport Tigers	Pre-season	September 2021
(Australia)	PR	Sam Hughes	Canterbury-Bankstown Bulldogs	Pre-season	September 2021
(Australia)	FE	Will Smith	Gold Coast Titans	Pre-season	October 2021
(Australia)	LK	Keegan Hipgrave	Retirement	Pre-season	November 2021

== Pre-season ==
20 February 2022	Parramatta Eels	22–26	St. George Illawarra Dragons	Parramatta
18:00 AEDT (UTC+11:00)		Report		Stadium: CommBank Stadium; Attendance: TBA

26 February 2022	Penrith Panthers	0–36	Parramatta Eels	Penrith
17:00 AEDT (UTC+11:00)		Report		Stadium: BlueBet Stadium; Attendance: TBA; Referee: Ben Cummins

== Home and away season ==
=== League table ===
2022 NRL season
Pos	Team	Pld	W	D	L	B	PF	PA	PD	Pts
1	Penrith Panthers (P)	24	20	0	4	1	636	330	+306	42
2	Cronulla-Sutherland Sharks	24	18	0	6	1	573	364	+209	38
3	North Queensland Cowboys	24	17	0	7	1	633	361	+272	36
4	Parramatta Eels	24	16	0	8	1	608	489	+119	34
5	Melbourne Storm	24	15	0	9	1	657	410	+247	32
6	Sydney Roosters	24	15	0	9	1	635	434	+201	32
7	South Sydney Rabbitohs	24	14	0	10	1	604	474	+130	30
8	Canberra Raiders	24	14	0	10	1	524	461	+63	30
9	Brisbane Broncos	24	13	0	11	1	514	550	−36	28
10	St. George Illawarra Dragons	24	12	0	12	1	469	569	−100	26
11	Manly Warringah Sea Eagles	24	9	0	15	1	490	595	−105	20
12	Canterbury-Bankstown Bulldogs	24	7	0	17	1	383	575	−192	16
13	Gold Coast Titans	24	6	0	18	1	455	660	−205	14
14	Newcastle Knights	24	6	0	18	1	372	662	−290	14
15	New Zealand Warriors	24	6	0	18	1	408	700	−292	14
16	Wests Tigers	24	4	0	20	1	352	679	−327	10

=== Result by round ===
Round	1	2	3	4	5	6	7	8	9	10	11	12	13	14	15	16	17	18	19	20	21	22	23	24	25
Ground	H	A	A	H	A	H	A	H	A	N	H	A	–	A	H	A	A	H	H	H	A	H	H	A	H
Result	W	L	W	W	W	L	W	L	W	L	W	W	B	L	W	L	W	W	L	W	W	L	W	W	W
Position	7	7	6	3	4	4	3	5	5	6	6	5	5	6	6	6	6	6	7	6	5	7	5	5	4
Points	2	2	4	6	8	8	10	10	12	12	14	16	18	18	20	20	22	24	24	26	18	28	30	32	34

Source: National Rugby League
A = Away; H = Home; N = Neutral; B = Bye; W = Win; D = Draw; L = Loss

=== Matches ===
Round 1: 13 March 2022	Parramatta Eels	32–28	Gold Coast Titans	Parramatta
16:05 AEDT	Tries: Russell 3', 7', 33'; Lane 18'; Blake 28'; Goals: Moses 6/8 9', 30', 33', 66 pen', 71 pen', 79 pen'	[https://www.nrl.com/draw/nrl-premiership/2022/round-1/eels-v-titans Details Report]	Tries: Sami 10', 41'; Kelly 23', 37'; Clark 35'; Goals: Sexton 4/5 12', 25', 36', 43'	Stadium: CommBank Stadium; Attendance: 18,211; Referee: Grant Atkins

Round 2: 19 March 2022	Cronulla-Sutherland Sharks	18–16	Parramatta Eels	Cronulla
17:30 AEDT	Tries: Mulitalo 11'; Katoa 28'; Tracey 57'; Wilton 79'; Goals: Hynes 1/4 80'	[https://www.nrl.com/draw/nrl-premiership/2022/round-2/sharks-v-eels Details Report]	Tries: Moses 39'; Mahoney 62'; Goals: Gutherson 4/4 40', 49 pen', 54 pen', 63'	Stadium: PointsBet Stadium; Attendance: 11,459; Referee: Peter Gough

Round 3: 26 March 2022	Melbourne Storm	24–28 (g.p.)	Parramatta Eels	Melbourne
15:30 AEDT	Tries: B. Smith 11'; Meaney 37', 43'; Papenhuyzen 75'; Goals: Papenhuyzen 4/4 13', 38', 44', 76'	[https://www.nrl.com/draw/nrl-premiership/2022/round-3/storm-v-eels Details Report]	Tries: Gutherson 17'; Blake 33'; Opacic 58'; Stone 70', 81'; Goals: Moses 4/4 19', 34', 60', 72'	Stadium: AAMI Park; Attendance: 15,691; Referee: Ashley Klein

Round 4: 3 April 2022	Parramatta Eels	48–14	St. George Illawarra Dragons	Parramatta
18:15 AEST	Tries: D. Brown 6'; Moses 16', 75'; N. Brown 43'; Mahoney 50'; Gutherson 52'; Blake 59', 67'; Goals: Moses 8/8 7', 18', 44', 51', 54', 60', 69', 76'	[https://www.nrl.com/draw/nrl-premiership/2022/round-4/eels-v-dragons Details Report]	Tries: Bird 34'; Sims 70'; Goals: Lomax 3/3 35', 40 pen', 71'	Stadium: CommBank Stadium; Attendance: 19,711; Referee: Todd Smith

Round 5: 9 April 2022	Gold Coast Titans	20–26	Parramatta Eels	Gold Coast
19:35 AEST	Tries: Sami 51'; Clark 59'; Fifita 66'; Marzhew 74'; Goals: Sexton 2/4 61', 68'	[https://www.nrl.com/draw/nrl-premiership/2022/round-5/titans-v-eels Details Report]	Tries: Gutherson 18', 32'; Simonsson 25'; Matterson 46'; D. Brown 71'; Goals: Moses 3/5 33', 47', 72'; Sin bin: Paulo (yellow card) 61' to 71'	Stadium: Cbus Super Stadium; Attendance: 14,478; Referee: Peter Gough

Round 6: 17 April 2022	Parramatta Eels	20–21	Wests Tigers	Parramatta
16:00 AEST	Tries: Gutherson 13'; Papali'i 34'; Mahoney 51'; Niukore 68'; Goals: Moses 2/4 15', 52'	[https://www.nrl.com/draw/nrl-premiership/2022/round-6/eels-v-wests-tigers Details Report]	Tries: Leilua 10'; Nofoaluma 22', 25'; Maumalo 48'; Goals: Brooks 1/3 11'; Hastings 1/1 50'; Field goals: Hastings 79'	Stadium: CommBank Stadium; Attendance: 28,366; Referee: Chris Butler

Round 7: 24 April 2022	Newcastle Knights	2–39	Parramatta Eels	Newcastle
14:00 AEST	Goals: Clifford 1/1 8 pen'	[https://www.nrl.com/draw/nrl-premiership/2022/round-7/knights-v-eels Details Report]	Tries: Lane 11'; Perham 29'; D. Brown 45'; Papali'i 57', 66'; Penisini 71'; Goals: Moses 7/8 12', 31', 37 pen', 46', 51 pen', 59', 72'; Field goals: Moses 79'	Stadium: McDonald Jones Stadium; Attendance: 25,169; Referee: Ashley Klein

Round 8: 30 April 2022	Parramatta Eels	4–35	North Queensland Cowboys	Darwin
19:05 ACST	Tries: Perham 63'; Goals: Moses 0/1	[https://www.nrl.com/draw/nrl-premiership/2022/round-8/eels-v-cowboys Details Report]	Tries: Feldt 30', 37', 57'; Dearden 74'; Tabuai-Fidow 77'; Drinkwater 78'; Goals: Holmes 5/7 16 pen', 32', 38', 78', 79'; Field goals: Holmes 39'	Stadium: TIO Stadium; Attendance: 10,017; Referee: Todd Smith

Round 9: 6 May 2022	Penrith Panthers	20–22	Parramatta Eels	Penrith
19:55 AEST	Tries: Edwards 4'; May 38', 53'; Leniu 77'; Goals: Cleary 2/4 6', 78'	[https://www.nrl.com/draw/nrl-premiership/2022/round-9/panthers-v-eels Details Report]	Tries: Gutherson 15'; Mahoney 26'; Matterson 66'; D. Brown 69'; Goals: Moses 3/4 27', 67', 70'	Stadium: BlueBet Stadium; Attendance: 21,348; Referee: Gerard Sutton

Round 10: 15 May 2022	Sydney Roosters	31–24	Parramatta Eels	Brisbane
16:05 AEST	Tries: Waerea-Hargreaves 3'; Tedesco 12'; Walker 24'; Sua'ali'i 43', 61'; Goals: Walker 5/7 4', 13', 16 pen', 26', 73'; Field goals: Walker 39'	[https://www.nrl.com/draw/nrl-premiership/2022/round-10/roosters-v-eels Details Report]	Tries: Papali'i 8', 47'; Moses 49'; Matterson 57'; Goals: Moses 4/4 10', 48', 51', 59'; Sin bin: Opacic (yellow card) 15' to 25'	Stadium: Suncorp Stadium; Attendance: 43,401; Referee: Adam Gee

Round 11: 20 May 2022	Parramatta Eels	22–20	Manly Warringah Sea Eagles	Parramatta
19:55 AEST	Tries: Perham 17', 29'; Opacic 59'; Penisini 77'; Goals: Moses 3/4 31', 60', 78'; Sin bin: Moses (yellow card) 39' to 49'	[https://www.nrl.com/draw/nrl-premiership/2022/round-11/eels-v-sea-eagles Details Report]	Tries: Garrick 13', 50'; Tuipulotu 21'; Harper 43'; Goals: Garrick 2/4 15', 22'; Sin bin: Keppie (yellow card) 72' to 80'	Stadium: CommBank Stadium; Attendance: 18,778; Referee: Ben Cummins

Round 12: 29 May 2022	Canberra Raiders	20–28	Parramatta Eels	Canberra
16:05 AEST	Tries: Kris 8', 35'; Whitehead 20'; Goals: Fogarty 4/4 9', 22', 36', 43 pen'	[https://www.nrl.com/draw/nrl-premiership/2022/round-12/raiders-v-eels Details Report]	Tries: Penisini 11'; D. Brown 16', 65'; Simonsson 27', 53'; Goals: Moses 4/5 13', 18', 55', 67'	Stadium: GIO Stadium; Attendance: 16,244; Referee: Todd Smith

Round 13 (Bye for Parramatta Eels)

Round 14: 13 June 2022	Canterbury-Bankstown Bulldogs	34–4	Parramatta Eels	Sydney Olympic Park
16:00 AEST	Tries: Addo-Carr 6', 47', 52'; Averillo 14', 72'; Kiraz 26'; Goals: Burton 5/6 16', 28', 48', 54', 73'	[https://www.nrl.com/draw/nrl-premiership/2022/round-14/bulldogs-v-eels Details Report]	Tries: Penisini 67'; Goals: Moses 0/1	Stadium: Accor Stadium; Attendance: 20,184; Referee: Ashley Klein

Round 15: 18 June 2022	Parramatta Eels	26–16	Sydney Roosters	Parramatta
19:35 AEST	Tries: D. Brown 7'; Papali'i 17'; Gutherson 20'; Sivo 31'; Mahoney 33'; Goals: Moses 3/5 8', 18', 35'	[https://www.nrl.com/draw/nrl-premiership/2022/round-15/eels-v-roosters Details Report]	Tries: Sua'ali'i 3', 47'; Tupouniua 26'; Goals: Walker 2/3 5', 27'	Stadium: CommBank Stadium; Attendance: 21,757; Referee: Todd Smith

Round 16: 2 July 2022	South Sydney Rabbitohs	30–12	Parramatta Eels	Sydney Olympic Park
19:35 AEST	Tries: Johnston 3', 39'; Arrow 16'; Paulo 60'; Cook 65'; Goals: L. Mitchell 5/5 5', 18', 40', 62', 66'	[https://www.nrl.com/draw/nrl-premiership/2022/round-16/rabbitohs-v-eels Details Report]	Tries: Gutherson 21', 72'; Goals: Moses 2/2 22', 73'	Stadium: Accor Stadium; Attendance: 10,102; Referee: Ben Cummins

Round 17: 9 July 2022	Wests Tigers	20–28	Parramatta Eels	Leichhardt
19:35 AEST	Tries: Brown 15'; Laurie 25'; Nofoaluma 70', 74'; Goals: Doueihi 2/4 17', 26'; Sin bin: Matamua (yellow card) 31' to 41'	[https://www.nrl.com/draw/nrl-premiership/2022/round-17/wests-tigers-v-eels Details Report]	Tries: Campbell-Gillard 30'; Sivo 37'; Mahoney 39'; Moses 42'; Papali'i 67'; Goals: Moses 4/5 31', 40', 44', 69'	Stadium: Leichhardt Oval; Attendance: 13,214; Referee: Chris Butler

Round 18: 15 July 2022	Parramatta Eels	28–18	New Zealand Warriors	Parramatta
19:55 AEST	Tries: Blake 11', 21'; Papali'i 53'; Gutherson 56'; Sivo 67'; Goals: Moses 4/5 23', 55', 57', 68'	[https://www.nrl.com/draw/nrl-premiership/2022/round-18/eels-v-warriors Details Report]	Tries: Montoya 32'; Kosi 75'; Murchie 78'; Goals: Johnson 3/3 34', 76', 78'	Stadium: CommBank Stadium; Attendance: 12,279; Referee: Todd Smith

Round 19: 21 July 2022	Parramatta Eels	14–36	Brisbane Broncos	Parramatta
19:50 AEST	Tries: Sivo 4', 52'; Blake 37'; Goals: Moses 1/3 38'; Sin bin: Penisini (yellow card) 31' to 41'	[https://www.nrl.com/draw/nrl-premiership/2022/round-19/eels-v-broncos Details Report]	Tries: Oates 10', 41'; Haas 19'; Riki 22'; Capewell 32'; Reynolds 69'; Goals: Reynolds 6/6 12', 21', 24', 34', 42', 71'	Stadium: CommBank Stadium; Attendance: 11,017; Referee: Gerard Sutton

Round 20: 29 July 2022	Parramatta Eels	34–10	Penrith Panthers	Parramatta
19:55 AEST	Tries: Papali'i 10'; Sivo 14', 77'; Mahoney 18', 26'; Gutherson 34'; Goals: Moses 5/6 12', 15', 19', 28', 35'	[https://www.nrl.com/draw/nrl-premiership/2022/round-20/eels-v-panthers Details Report]	Tries: O'Sullivan 6'; Martin 62'; Goals: Cleary 0/1; O'Sullivan 1/1 63'; Sent off: Cleary (red card) 17'	Stadium: CommBank Stadium; Attendance: 26,912; Referee: Todd Smith

Round 21: 5 August 2022	Manly Warringah Sea Eagles	20–36	Parramatta Eels	Brookvale
19:55 AEST	Tries: Koula 20'; Saab 28'; Tuipulotu 44'; Goals: Garrick 4/5 22', 24 pen', 30', 52 pen'	[https://www.nrl.com/draw/nrl-premiership/2022/round-21/sea-eagles-v-eels Details Report]	Tries: Sivo 2', 8'; Opacic 33'; Blake 55'; Gutherson 61'; Penisini 68'; D. Brown 71'; Goals: Gutherson 4/7 35', 63', 69', 73'	Stadium: 4 Pines Park; Attendance: 17,134; Referee: Gerard Sutton

Round 22: 12 August 2022	Parramatta Eels	0–26	South Sydney Rabbitohs	Parramatta
19:55 AEST		[https://www.nrl.com/draw/nrl-premiership/2022/round-22/eels-v-rabbitohs Details Report]	Tries: Walker 4', 69'; Thompson 12'; Johnston 26', 55'; Goals: L. Mitchell 3/5 5', 56', 70'	Stadium: CommBank Stadium; Attendance: 22,958; Referee: Grant Atkins

Round 23: 20 August 2022	Parramatta Eels	42–6	Canterbury-Bankstown Bulldogs	Parramatta
15:00 AEST	Tries: Penisini 10'; Blake 14', 78'; Sivo 34'; Matterson 45'; Opacic 48'; D. Brown 61', 65'; Goals: Moses 5/8 11', 16', 46', 62', 66'	[https://www.nrl.com/draw/nrl-premiership/2022/round-23/eels-v-bulldogs Details Report]	Tries: Schoupp 28'; Goals: Burton 1/2 5 pen'	Stadium: CommBank Stadium; Attendance: 26,451; Referee: Ashley Klein

Round 24: 25 August 2022	Brisbane Broncos	6–53	Parramatta Eels	Brisbane
19:50 AEST	Tries: Lee 29'; Goals: Staggs 1/1 31'	[https://www.nrl.com/draw/nrl-premiership/2022/round-24/broncos-v-eels Details Report]	Tries: Sivo 10'; Opacic 16', 77'; Gutherson 18', 36'; Moses 26'; Papali'i 65'; Penisini 68'; Blake 79'; Goals: Moses 8/9 11', 17', 20', 28', 38', 67', 70', 80'; Field goals: Moses 39'	Stadium: Suncorp Stadium; Attendance: 30,371; Referee: Grant Atkins

Round 25: 1 September 2022	Parramatta Eels	22–14	Melbourne Storm	Parramatta
19:50 AEST	Tries: D. Brown 12'; Penisini 43'; Sivo 60'; Goals: Moses 5/5 14', 30 pen', 44', 62', 71 pen'	[https://www.nrl.com/draw/nrl-premiership/2022/round-25/eels-v-storm Details Report]	Tries: H. Grant 66'; Meaney 76'; Nofoaluma 78'; Goals: Meaney 1/2 76'; Munster 0/1	Stadium: CommBank Stadium; Attendance: 23,758; Referee: Ashley Klein

== Finals series ==
=== Bracket ===
Qualifying and elimination finals
9 September – Sydney
1	Penrith Panthers	27
4	Parramatta Eels	8
10 September – Melbourne
5	Melbourne Storm	20
8	Canberra Raiders	28
11 September – Sydney
6	Sydney Roosters	14
7	South Sydney Rabbitohs	30
10 September – Sydney
2	Cronulla-Sutherland Sharks	30
3	North Queensland Cowboys	32

Semi-finals
16 September – Sydney
Parramatta Eels	40
Canberra Raiders	4
17 September – Sydney
Cronulla-Sutherland Sharks	12
South Sydney Rabbitohs	38

Preliminary finals
24 September – Sydney
Penrith Panthers	32
South Sydney Rabbitohs	12
23 September – Townsville
North Queensland Cowboys	20
Parramatta Eels	24

Grand final
2 October – Sydney
Penrith Panthers	28
Parramatta Eels	12

=== Matches ===
QEF: 9 September 2022	Penrith Panthers	27–8	Parramatta Eels	Penrith
19:50 AEST	Tries: To'o 15', 51'; Edwards 59'; Fisher-Harris 61'; Goals: Cleary 5/5 16', 53', 60', 63', 78 pen' Field goals: Cleary 37'; Sin bin: May (yellow card) 11' to 21'	[https://www.nrl.com/draw/nrl-premiership/2022/finals-week-1/panthers-v-eels Details Report]	Tries: Kaufusi 28'; Goals: Moses 2/2 29', 46 pen'	Stadium: BlueBet Stadium; Attendance: 21,863; Referee: Gerard Sutton

SF: 16 September 2022	Parramatta Eels	40–4	Canberra Raiders	Parramatta
19:50 AEST	Tries: Penisini 6'; Opacic 14'; Blake 19'; Paulo 23'; Moses 45'; Niukore 70', 79'; Goals: Moses 6/8 7', 21', 25', 47', 72', 75 pen'	[https://www.nrl.com/draw/nrl-premiership/2022/finals-week-2/eels-v-raiders Details Report]	Tries: Savage 28'; Goals: Fogarty 0/1	Stadium: CommBank Stadium; Attendance: 29,134; Referee: Ashley Klein

PF: 23 September 2022	North Queensland Cowboys	20–24	Parramatta Eels	Townsville
19:50 AEST	Tries: Cotter 11'; Leilua 25'; Taulagi 52'; Goals: Holmes 4/5 13', 38 pen', 49 pen', 54'; Sin bin: Taumalolo (yellow card) 15' to 25'	[https://www.nrl.com/draw/nrl-premiership/2022/finals-week-3/cowboys-v-eels Details Report]	Tries: Penisini 6'; Campbell-Gillard 18', 57'; Sivo 64'; Goals: Moses 4/4 8', 19', 58', 65'	Stadium: Queensland Country Bank Stadium; Attendance: 25,372; Referee: Grant Atkins

GF: 2 October 2022	Penrith Panthers	28–12	Parramatta Eels	Sydney Olympic Park
19:30 AEDT	Tries: Crichton 10'; To'o 17', 45'; Sorensen 27'; Staines 58'; Goals: Cleary 4/6 12', 21 pen', 28', 60'	[https://www.nrl.com/draw/nrl-premiership/2022/grand-final/panthers-v-eels Details Report]	Tries: Gutherson 76'; Arthur 77'; Goals: Moses 2/2 76', 78'	Stadium: Accor Stadium; Attendance: 82,415; Referee: Ashley Klein
