= 2021 Parramatta Eels season =

Australia Rugby League Parramatta Eels 2021 season

- NRL Rank: 6th
- Play-off result: Semi-finalists (Lost 8–6 vs Penrith Panthers, 2nd Semi Final)
- World Club Challenge: DNQ
- 2021 record: Wins: 15; draws: 0; losses: 9
- Points scored: For: 566; against: 457

Team information
- CEO: Jim Sarantinos
- Coach: (Australia) Brad Arthur
- Captain: (Australia) Clinton Gutherson
- Stadium: Bankwest Stadium (Capacity: 30,000); TIO Stadium (Capacity: 12,500); Cbus Super Stadium (Capacity: 27,400)
- Avg. attendance: 14,772 (Home); 15,825 (Home & Away); 5,549 (Finals Series)
- Agg. attendance: 162,490 (Home); 363,977 (Home & Away); 11,098 (Finals Series)
- High attendance: 25,711 (7 May vs Sydney Roosters, Round 9)

Top scorers
- Tries: (Fiji) Maika Sivo (17)
- Goals: (Lebanon) Mitchell Moses (66)
- Points: (Lebanon) Mitchell Moses (146)
← 2020	List of seasons	2022 →

The 2021 Parramatta Eels season was the 75th in the club's history. Coached by Brad Arthur and captained by Clinton Gutherson, they competed in the NRL's 2021 Telstra Premiership.

== Summary ==
Similar to the 2020, Parramatta started the 2021 season in good form winning nine of the opening ten games. Towards the back end of the season however, Parramatta once again displayed inconsistent form and were hit with heavy losses against South Sydney and Manly. They also suffered an embarrassing 28-0 loss against an understrength Sydney Roosters side in round 20. In round 24, Parramatta produced the biggest upset of the season defeating Melbourne 22-10 who were on a 19-game winning streak. Parramatta would finish the regular season in sixth place. In the elimination final, they defeated Newcastle 28-20. The following week, they played Penrith in what would turn out to be the lowest scoring game of the season. Parramatta would lose the match in controversial circumstances 8-6.

== Squad information ==
The playing squad and coaching staff of the Parramatta Eels for the 2021 NRL season.

Parramatta Eels
Top 30 squad			Extended squad	Coaching staff
Jake Arthur – HB, FE; Waqa Blake – CE; Dylan Brown – FE, HB; Nathan Brown – LK; Reagan Campbell-Gillard – PR; Bryce Cartwright – SR, LK; Haze Dunster – WG, CE; Blake Ferguson – WG, CE, FB; Wiremu Greig – PR; Clinton Gutherson (c) – FB	Keegan Hipgrave – SR, LK; David Hollis – PR; Sam Hughes – PR; Oregon Kaufusi – PR, LK; Shaun Lane – SR; Joey Lussick – HK; Reed Mahoney – HK; Ryan Matterson – SR, LK, FE; Mitchell Moses – HB; Marata Niukore – SR, LK, LK	Michael Oldfield – WG, CE; Tom Opacic – CE; Isaiah Papali'i – SR, LK; Junior Paulo – PR; Will Penisini – CE, WG; Hayze Perham – FB, CE, FE; Jordan Rankin – FE, FB, HB; Maika Sivo – WG; Will Smith – FE, FB, HK; Ray Stone – LK, SR, LK	Kurt Dillon – PR; Tim Lafai – CE; Samuel Loizou (DP) – WG, FE; Makahesi Makatoa – LK, SR; Solomone Naiduki (DP) – WG; Nathaniel Roache (DP) – HK; Ky Rodwell – PR, LK, SR; Sean Russell (DP) – FB, FE, WG	Head coach: Brad Arthur; Assistant coaches: Steve Murphy; David Kidwell; Ryan Carr (NSW Cup coach); Dean Feeney (Jersey Flegg coach); Legend: (c) Captain(s); (vc) Vice-captain(s); Updated: 13 May 2021; Source(s): Eels Team Profiles

== Transfers ==
In:

Nat.	Pos.	Name	From	Transfer window	Date	Ref.
(Australia)	CE	Tom Opacic	North Queensland Cowboys	Pre-season	October 2020
(New Zealand)	LK	Isaiah Papali'i	New Zealand Warriors	Pre-season	October 2020
(Australia)	HK	Joey Lussick	Salford Red Devils	Pre-season	October 2020
(Tonga)	CE	Michael Oldfield	Canberra Raiders	Pre-season	November 2020
(Australia)	LK	Keegan Hipgrave	Gold Coast Titans	Pre-season	November 2020
(New Zealand)	HK	Nathaniel Roache	New Zealand Warriors	Pre-season	November 2020
(Australia)	SR	Bryce Cartwright	Gold Coast Titans	Pre-season	November 2020
(New Zealand)	PR	Wiremu Greig	North Queensland Cowboys	Mid-season	March 2021
(New Zealand)	CE	Hayze Perham	New Zealand Warriors	Mid-season	April 2021

Out:

Nat.	Pos.	Name	To	Transfer window	Date	Ref.
(New Zealand)	PR	Stefano Utoikamanu	Wests Tigers	Pre-season	January 2020
(Fiji)	PR	Kane Evans	New Zealand Warriors	Pre-season	August 2020
(Australia)	SR	David Gower	Retired	Pre-season	October 2020
(Tonga)	PR	Peni Terepo	Retired	Pre-season	October 2020
(Australia)	FE	Jai Field	Wigan Warriors	Pre-season	October 2020
(Australia)	SR	Andrew Davey	Manly Warringah Sea Eagles	Pre-season	October 2020
(Australia)	HK	Rhys Davies	Mount Pritchard Mounties	Pre-season	October 2020
(Australia)	HB	Jaeman Salmon	Penrith Panthers	Pre-season	October 2020
(Cook Islands)	CE	Brad Takairangi	Hull Kingston Rovers	Pre-season	October 2020
(Australia)	HK	Kyle Schneider	Released	Pre-season	October 2020
(New Zealand)	FB	Watson Heleta	Mount Pritchard Mounties	Pre-season	October 2020
(Tonga)	WG	George Jennings	Melbourne Storm	Pre-season	November 2020
(Australia)	PR	Daniel Alvaro	St. George Illawarra Dragons	Pre-season	December 2020
(Tonga)	CE	Michael Jennings	Released	Mid-season	May 2021

== Pre-season ==
Round	Home	Score	Away	Match information		
Round	Home	Score	Away	Date and time (local)	Venue	Attendance
1	St George Illawarra Dragons	6 – 28	Parramatta Eels	Thursday, 18 February, 6:00 pm	Netstrata Jubilee Stadium	0
2	Penrith Panthers	16 – 6	Parramatta Eels	Saturday, 27 February, 7:30 pm	Panthers Stadium	

== Home and away season ==
=== League table ===
Pos	Team	Pld	W	D	L	B	PF	PA	PD	Pts	
1	Melbourne Storm (M)	24	21	0	3	1	815	316	+499	44	Advance to finals series
2	Penrith Panthers (P)	24	21	0	3	1	676	286	+390	44	Advance to finals series
3	South Sydney Rabbitohs	24	20	0	4	1	775	453	+322	42	Advance to finals series
4	Manly-Warringah Sea Eagles	24	16	0	8	1	744	492	+252	34	Advance to finals series
5	Sydney Roosters	24	16	0	8	1	630	489	+141	34	Advance to finals series
6	Parramatta Eels	24	15	0	9	1	566	457	+109	32	Advance to finals series
7	Newcastle Knights	24	12	0	12	1	428	571	−143	26	Advance to finals series
8	Gold Coast Titans	24	10	0	14	1	580	583	−3	22	Advance to finals series
9	Cronulla-Sutherland Sharks	24	10	0	14	1	520	556	−36	22	
10	Canberra Raiders	24	10	0	14	1	481	578	−97	22	
11	St. George Illawarra Dragons	24	8	0	16	1	474	616	−142	18	
12	New Zealand Warriors	24	8	0	16	1	453	624	−171	18	
13	Wests Tigers	24	8	0	16	1	500	714	−214	18	
14	Brisbane Broncos	24	7	0	17	1	446	695	−249	16	
15	North Queensland Cowboys	24	7	0	17	1	460	748	−288	16	
16	Canterbury-Bankstown Bulldogs (W)	24	3	0	21	1	340	710	−370	8	

Updated to match(es) played on 5 September 2021. Source: 2021 NRL Ladder
(M) Minor premiers; (P) Premiers; (W) Wooden spoon

=== Matches ===
Round	Home	Score	Away	Match information		
Round	Home	Score	Away	Date and time (local)	Venue	Attendance
1	Brisbane Broncos	16 – 24	Parramatta Eels	Friday, 12 March, 8:05 pm	Suncorp Stadium	28,313
2	Parramatta Eels	16 – 12	Melbourne Storm	Thursday, 18 March, 8:05 pm	Bankwest Stadium	10,416
3	Parramatta Eels	28 – 4	Cronulla-Sutherland Sharks	Saturday, 27 March, 7:35 pm	Bankwest Stadium	19,236
4	Wests Tigers	22 – 36	Parramatta Eels	Monday, 5 April, 4:00 pm	Stadium Australia	29,056
5	Parramatta Eels	12 – 26	St George Illawarra Dragons	Sunday, 11 April, 6:15 pm	Bankwest Stadium	24,384
6	Canberra Raiders	10 – 35	Parramatta Eels	Saturday, 17 April, 7:35 pm	GIO Stadium	20,089
7	Parramatta Eels	46 – 6	Brisbane Broncos	Friday, 23 April, 7:55 pm	TIO Stadium	12,056
8	Canterbury-Bankstown Bulldogs	10 – 32	Parramatta Eels	Saturday, 1 May, 5:30 pm	Stadium Australia	13,273
9	Parramatta Eels	31 – 18	Sydney Roosters	Friday, 7 May, 7:55 pm	Bankwest Stadium	25,711
10	New Zealand Warriors	18 – 34	Parramatta Eels	Sunday, 16 May, 1:50 pm	Suncorp Stadium	33,175
11	Parramatta Eels	6 – 28	Manly Warringah Sea Eagles	Sunday, 23 May, 4:05 pm	Bankwest Stadium	24,411
12	South Sydney Rabbitohs	38 – 20	Parramatta Eels	Saturday, 29 May, 5:30 pm	Stadium Australia	20,743
13	Newcastle Knights	4 – 40	Parramatta Eels	Sunday, 6 June, 4:05 pm	McDonald Jones Stadium	23,015
14	Parramatta Eels	40 – 12	Wests Tigers	Sunday, 13 June, 4:05 pm	Bankwest Stadium	23,417
15	Parramatta Eels	36 – 10	Canterbury-Bankstown Bulldogs	Sunday, 20 June, 2:00 pm	Bankwest Stadium	17,276
16	Penrith Panthers	13 – 12	Parramatta Eels	Friday, 2 July, 7:55 pm	BlueBet Stadium	0^{a}
17	Bye Round					
18	Gold Coast Titans	8 – 26	Parramatta Eels	Friday, 16 July, 6:00 pm	Cbus Super Stadium	15,038
19	Parramatta Eels	10 – 12	Canberra Raiders	Thursday, 22 July, 7:50 pm	Cbus Super Stadium	2,566
20	Sydney Roosters	28 – 0	Parramatta Eels	Thursday, 29 July, 7:50 pm	BB Print Stadium	4,926
21	Parramatta Eels	12 – 40	South Sydney Rabbitohs	Friday, 6 August, 8:05 pm	Cbus Super Stadium	0^{a}
22	Manly-Warringah Sea Eagles	56 – 10	Parramatta Eels	Saturday, 14 August, 7:35 pm	Sunshine Coast Stadium	3,613
23	Parramatta Eels	32 – 16	North Queensland Cowboys	Saturday, 21 August, 7:35 pm	Cbus Super Stadium	3,013
24	Melbourne Storm	10 – 22	Parramatta Eels	Saturday, 28 August, 7:35 pm	Suncorp Stadium	10,246
25	Parramatta Eels	6 – 40	Penrith Panthers	Friday, 3 September, 8:05 pm	Cbus Super Stadium	8,580

Notes: ^{a}For rounds 16 and 21, matches were played behind closed doors due to the COVID-19 pandemic.

== Finals series ==
=== Bracket ===
Qualifying and elimination finals
10 September – Sunshine Coast
1	Melbourne Storm	40
4	Manly Warringah Sea Eagles	12
11 September – Townsville
5	Sydney Roosters	25
8	Gold Coast Titans	24
12 September – Rockhampton
6	Parramatta Eels	28
7	Newcastle Knights	20
11 September – Townsville
2	Penrith Panthers	10
3	South Sydney Rabbitohs	16

Semi-finals
17 September – Mackay
Manly Warringah Sea Eagles	42
Sydney Roosters	6
18 September – Mackay
Penrith Panthers	8
Parramatta Eels	6

Preliminary finals
25 September – Brisbane
Melbourne Storm	6
Penrith Panthers	10
24 September – Brisbane
South Sydney Rabbitohs	36
Manly Warringah Sea Eagles	16

Grand final
3 October – Brisbane
Penrith Panthers	14
South Sydney Rabbitohs	12

=== Matches ===
Round	Home	Score	Away	Match information		
Round	Home	Score	Away	Date and time (local)	Venue	Attendance
EF2	Parramatta Eels	28 – 20	Newcastle Knights	Sunday, 12 September, 4:05 pm	Browne Park	5,087
SF2	Penrith Panthers	8 – 6	Parramatta Eels	Saturday, 18 September, 7:50 pm	BB Print Stadium	6,011
