= Tom Opacic =

Australian rugby league footballer

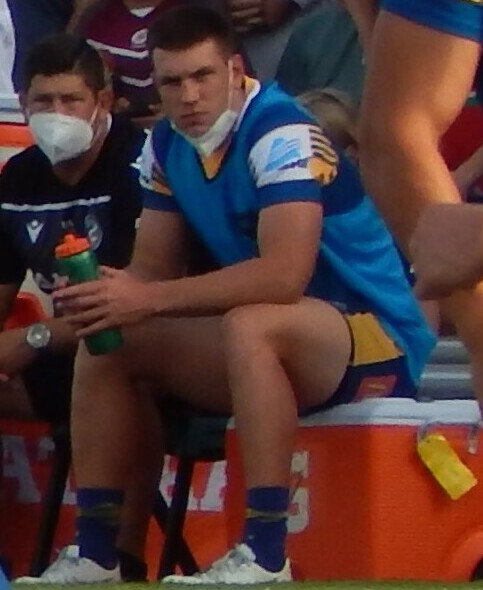

Personal information
- Full name: Thomas Opacic
- Born: 7 September 1994 (age 32) Redcliffe, Queensland, Australia
- Height: 183 cm (6 ft 0 in)
- Weight: 100 kg (15 st 10 lb)

Playing information
- Position: Centre, Second-row
Club
Years	Team	Pld	T	G	FG	P
2016–18	Brisbane Broncos	19	5	0	0	20
2019–20	North Qld Cowboys	24	9	0	0	36
2021–22	Parramatta Eels	40	14	0	0	56
2023–24	Hull Kingston Rovers	48	14	0	0	44
	Total	131	42	0	0	156
Representative
Years	Team	Pld	T	G	FG	P
2017	Queensland Residents	1	1	0	0	4
- Source: As of 15 February 2024

Thomas Opacic (/oʊpətʃɪk/) (born 7 September 1994) is an Australian professional rugby league footballer who plays as a centre for the Redcliffe Dolphins in the Hostplus Cup.

He previously played for the Brisbane Broncos, North Queensland Cowboys, and the Parramatta Eels in the National Rugby League.

== Background ==
Opacic was born in Redcliffe, Queensland, Australia, and is of Serbian descent.

He played his junior rugby league for the Redcliffe Dolphins.

== Playing career ==
=== Early career ===
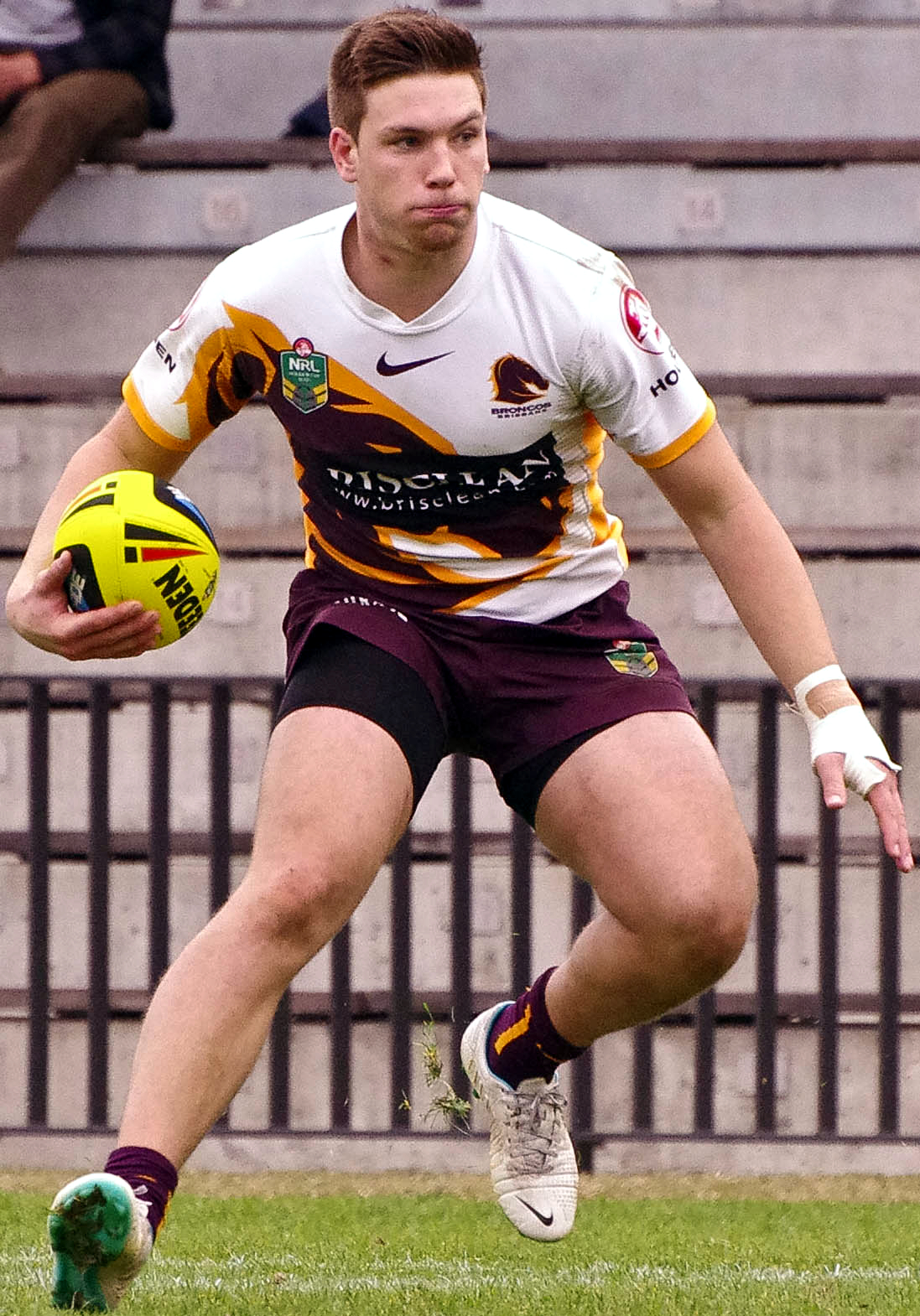
Opacic playing for the Broncos in 2014

In 2013 and 2014, Opacic played for the Brisbane Broncos' NYC team, before graduating to their Queensland Cup team, and his old junior club, Redcliffe Dolphins in 2015.

=== 2016 ===
In Round 16 of the 2016 NRL season, Opacic made his NRL debut for the Brisbane club against the Canterbury-Bankstown Bulldogs. In September, he re-signed with Brisbane on a two-year contract until the end of 2018.

=== 2017 ===
Opacic failed to play a first grade game in 2017, after undergoing two shoulder reconstructions in the summer to treat injuries he suffered in the 2016 finals. During Opacic's recovery, Tautau Moga became one of the first choice centres for Brisbane that year, relegating him to the Queensland Cup that season.

=== 2018 ===
The signing of Jack Bird, as well as the emergence of promising outside backs, Kotoni Staggs and Jamayne Isaako, meant that Opacic spent most of 2018 playing for the Redcliffe Dolphins in the Queensland Cup competition. He scored his only try for the season, coming off the bench in Brisbane's 24-20 win against their rivals, the North Queensland Cowboys, in Round 2. Opacic appeared in 10 games for the Brisbane club in the 2018 season, starting in six and coming off the bench in four.

On 8 August, Opacic re-signed with the Brisbane side on a two-year deal but a month later was released by the club to sign with the North Queensland Cowboys until the end of 2020.

=== 2019 ===
In Round 1 of the 2019 NRL season, Opacic made his club debut for North Queensland in their 24–12 win over the St George Illawarra Dragons. Following a Round 2 defeat by Brisbane, Opacic was dropped to the Townsville Blackhawks. Opacic returned to first grade in North Queensland's Round 8 win over the Gold Coast Titans. A week later, he scored his first try for the club in a 16–32 loss to the South Sydney Rabbitohs.

After his early struggles, Opacic locked down the right centre position for the North Queensland club, playing the remaining 17 games, scoring seven tries and forming a dynamic partnership with winger Kyle Feldt.

=== 2020 ===
In February, Opacic was a member of the Cowboys' 2020 NRL Nines winning squad. Opacic played just five NRL games in 2020, scoring two tries, struggling to hold down a starting centre position. On 3 October, the North Queensland club announced that Opacic would be departing the club at the end of the season. On 21 October, it was announced that Opacic had signed a one-year deal with the Parramatta Eels.

=== 2021 ===
He made his debut for Parramatta in round 1 of the 2021 NRL season where the club recorded a 24-16 victory over Brisbane.

In round 4, he scored two tries for Parramatta in a 36-22 victory over the Wests Tigers at Stadium Australia.

=== 2022 ===
Opacic started the season with Parramatta's NSW Cup team and scored four tries in the clubs 34-6 opening round victory over St. George. Following an injury to Sean Russell, Opacic was called into the NRL squad for the club's round 2 match against Cronulla. On 10 August, Opacic signed a two-year deal to join English side Hull Kingston Rovers starting in 2023. In round 24, Opacic scored two tries for Parramatta in a 53-6 victory over Brisbane. Opacic played in Parramatta's opening two finals matches against Penrith and Canberra but suffered a hamstring injury during the clubs win over the latter opponent. Opacic subsequently missed Parramatta's upset preliminary final victory over North Queensland and the 2022 NRL Grand Final against Penrith which Parramatta lost 28-12.

=== 2023 ===
Opacic made his club debut for Hull Kingston Rovers in round 1 of the 2023 Super League season as they upset Wigan 27-18. On 12 August, Opacic played for Hull Kingston Rovers in their 17-16 golden point extra-time loss to Leigh in the Challenge Cup final. Opacic played 26 games for Hull Kingston Rovers in the 2023 Super League season as the club finished fourth on the table and qualified for the playoffs. He played in the clubs semi-final loss against Wigan.

=== 2024 ===
On 19 August, Hull KR confirmed that Opacic would depart the team at the end of the season. On 20 December, Opacic signed with the Redcliffe Dolphins.

== Achievements and accolades ==
=== Team ===
- 2020 NRL Nines: North Queensland Cowboys – Winners
- 2023 Challenge Cup: Hull Kingston Rovers – Runners-Up
- 2024 Super League Grand Final: Hull Kingston Rovers – Runners-Up

== Statistics ==
=== NRL ===
Season	Team	Matches	T	G	GK %	F/G	Pts
2016	Brisbane Broncos	9	4	0	—	0	16
2018	Brisbane Broncos	10	1	0	—	0	4
2019	North Queensland Cowboys	19	7	0	—	0	28
2020	North Queensland Cowboys	5	2	0	—	0	8
2021	Parramatta Eels	21	7	0	—	0	12
2022	Parramatta Eels	19	7	0	—	0	8
2023	Hull KR	30	9				36
2024	Hull KR	18	5				20
Career totals		131	42	0	—	0	156
