= Ofahiki Ogden =

New Zealand rugby league footballer

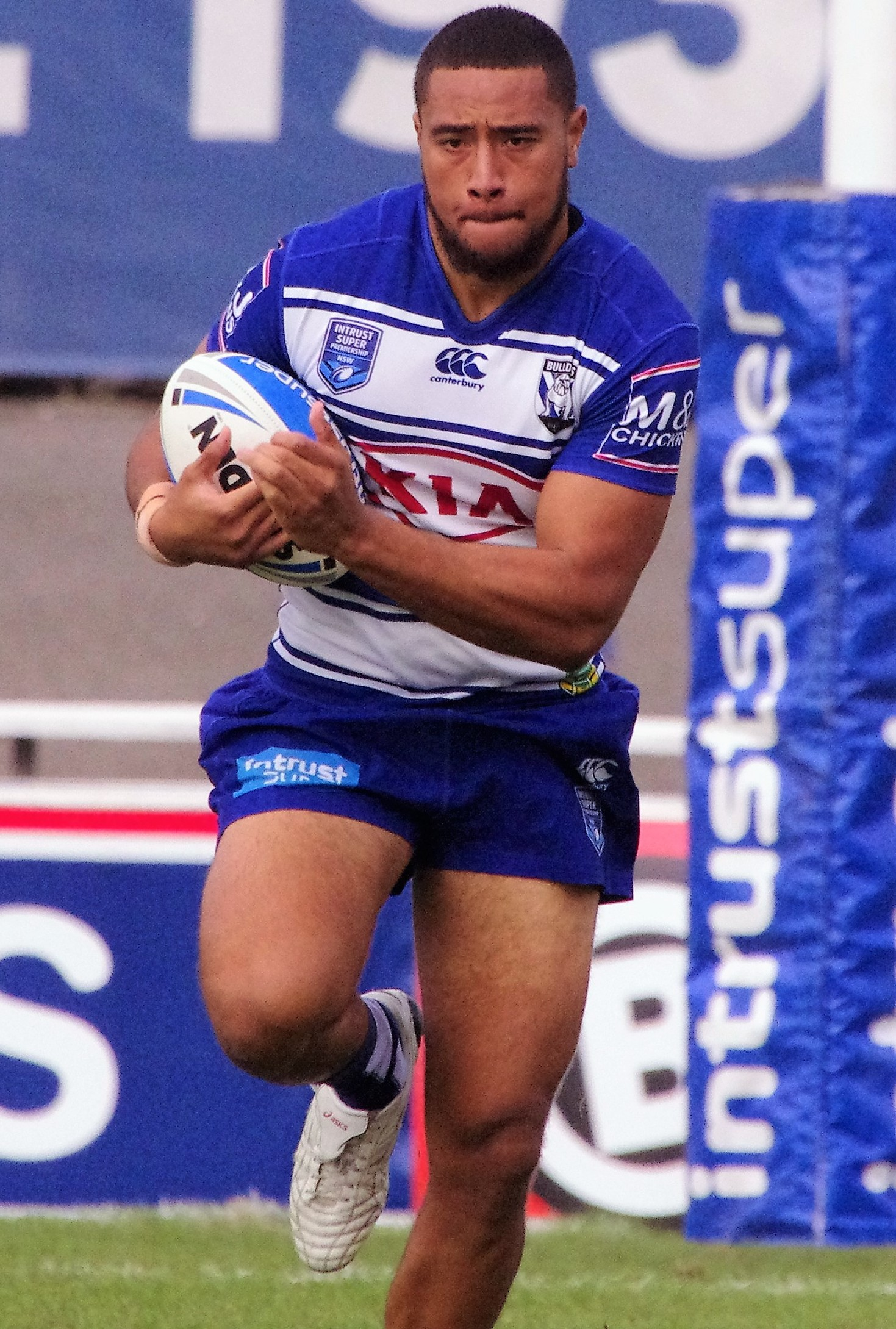

Personal information
- Full name: Ofahiki Ogden
- Born: 6 June 1996 (age 30) Auckland, New Zealand
- Height: 192 cm (6 ft 4 in)
- Weight: 109 kg (17 st 2 lb)

Playing information
- Position: Prop
Club
Years	Team	Pld	T	G	FG	P
2018–21	Canterbury Bulldogs	45	2	0	0	8
2022–24	Parramatta Eels	13	1	0	0	4
	Total	58	3	0	0	12
- Source: As of 11 September 2024

Ofahiki Ogden (born 6 June 1996) is a New Zealand rugby league footballer who plays for the North Sydney Bears in NSW Cup as a prop he previously played for Canterbury-Bankstown Bulldogs & for the Parramatta Eels in the National Rugby League (NRL).

== Early life ==
Ogden was born in Auckland, New Zealand. He is of Tongan descent. He played his junior rugby league for the Mangere East Hawks and attended De La Salle College, Mangere East.

== Playing career ==
=== Canterbury-Bankstown Bulldogs (2018–2021) ===
Ogden made his NRL debut for Canterbury-Bankstown in round 16 of the 2018 NRL season against the Newcastle Knights.

Ogden spent most of the 2018 season playing with Canterbury's reserve grade team. Ogden played in the club's Intrust Super Premiership NSW grand final victory over Newtown at Leichhardt Oval. The following week, Ogden played in Canterbury's NRL State Championship side which defeated Redcliffe 42–18 at ANZ Stadium.

Ogden made 13 appearances for Canterbury in the 2019 NRL season as the club finished 12th on the table.

Ogden played 11 games for Canterbury in the 2020 NRL season. The club finished 15th on the table and only avoided the wooden spoon due to a better for and against over last placed Brisbane.

Ogden made a total of 12 appearances for Canterbury in the 2021 NRL season as the club finished last and claimed the Wooden Spoon.

=== Parramatta Eels (2022–2024) ===
On 28 November 2021, Ogden signed a train and trial deal with Canterbury's arch rivals, the Parramatta Eels. On 20 February 2022, Ogden signed a three-year deal with Parramatta until the end of 2024. Ogden made his club debut for Parramatta in round 22 of the 2022 NRL season against South Sydney which ended in a 26–0 loss. Ogden played a total of nine matches for Parramatta in the 2023 NRL season as the club finished 10th and missed the finals. On 18 April 2024, it was announced that Ogden would miss at least 12 weeks with a pectoral tear following Parramatta's victory over North Sydney in the NSW Cup. On 11 September, it was announced that Ogden would be departing the Parramatta club after not being offered a new contract.

=== 2025 ===
Ogden played 19 games for North Sydney Bears in the NSW Cup scoring 2 tries.

== Controversy ==
On 2 October 2021, Ogden was arrested by NSW Police for alleged drug possession. The matter was then referred onto the NRL Integrity Unit. On 11 November, Ogden pleaded guilty to cocaine possession but avoided conviction at Waverley Local Court.
