= Maika Sivo =

Fiji international rugby league footballer (born 1993)

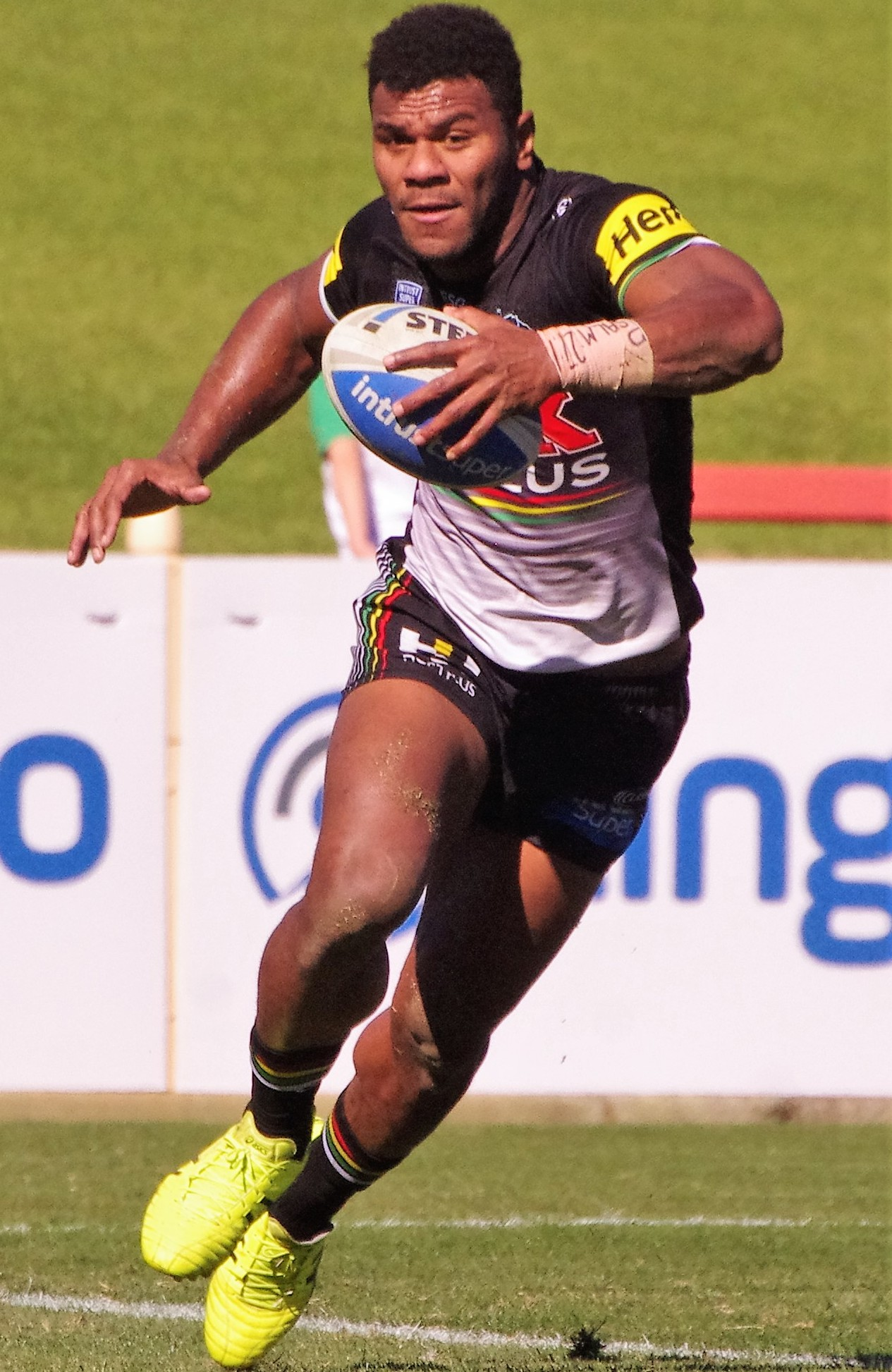

Personal information
- Born: 3 October 1993 (age 33) Nadi, Fiji
- Height: 6 ft 1 in (1.85 m)
- Weight: 17 st 5 lb (110 kg)

Playing information
- Position: Wing
Club
Years	Team	Pld	T	G	FG	P
2019–24	Parramatta Eels	115	104	0	0	416
2025–	Leeds Rhinos	21	31	0	0	124
	Total	136	135	0	0	540
Representative
Years	Team	Pld	T	G	FG	P
2018	NSW Residents	1	0	0	0	0
2019–24	Fiji	12	12	0	0	88
2019	Fiji 9s	3	1	0	0	4
- Source: As of 6 November 2026

Maika Sivo (born 3 October 1993) is a Fijian professional rugby league footballer who plays as a winger for the Leeds Rhinos in the Super League and for Fiji at international level.

He has previously played for the Parramatta Eels in the NRL, Fiji 9s at international level and the NSW Residents side at representative level.

== Background ==
Sivo grew up in Momi Bay, Fiji and played rugby union until 2014 when he was 22.

Sivo first played rugby league for the Gundagai Tigers in 2015 before playing for Mounties in the Sydney Shield in 2016. He then moved to St Mary's Saints signing with their Ron Massey Cup team in 2017, Where he scored 18 tries in 9 games, before he got the call up into the Penrith Panthers reserve grade team for the remainder of the season and he had success as they won the NSW Cup and the National final against the PNG Hunters on NRL Grand Final Day.

Sivo signed with the Penrith Panthers until the end of the 2018 season, scoring 12 tries in his first season with the club's lower grade. In 2018, he signed a two-year deal with the Parramatta Eels. In 2024, Sivo was granted an immediate release from his contract.

== Playing career ==
=== 2019 ===
Sivo made his NRL debut in Round 1 of the 2019 NRL season against the Penrith Panthers. He scored his first NRL try against the Sydney Roosters in round 3, scoring two tries in a losing effort.

In Round 6 against Wests Tigers, Sivo scored a try as Parramatta won the match 51–6 in the opening NRL match to be played at the new Western Sydney Stadium. In Round 8 against St George, Sivo scored 2 tries for Parramatta, one of which was a length of the field try. Parramatta would go on to win the match 32–18 after being down 14-0 earlier in the game.

In Round 13 against Cronulla-Sutherland, Sivo scored 2 tries in a losing effort as Parramatta were defeated 42–22. In Round 19 2019 against the New Zealand Warriors, he palmed off New Zealand player Blake Ayshford on his way to the try line. Fox Sports commentator Andrew Voss said of Sivo's fend on Ayshford "If you can get a charge for palming blokes in the sternum, Sivo’s looking at 10 weeks,". Sivo later scored a try in a 24–22 victory.

In round 25 against Manly-Warringah, Sivo scored a hat-trick as Parramatta won the match 32–16 at the Western Sydney Stadium. The victory saw Parramatta finish 5th on the table at the end of the regular season.

Sivo finished the 2019 NRL season with 20 tries, one behind Israel Folau's record of 21 in a rookie NRL season.

In the elimination final against Brisbane, Sivo scored two tries as Parramatta won the match 58–0 at the new Western Sydney Stadium. The victory was the biggest finals win in history, eclipsing Newtown's 55–7 victory over St George in 1944. The match was also Parramatta's biggest victory over Brisbane, and Brisbane's worst ever loss since entering the competition in March 14 1988.

=== 2020 ===
In round 8 of the 2020 NRL season, Sivo scored four tries as Parramatta defeated North Queensland 42–4 at Bankwest Stadium.

In round 11 against Wests Tigers, Sivo scored two tries as Parramatta won the game 26–16 at Bankwest Stadium.

In the qualifying final against Melbourne, Sivo injured his leg in the first half of the match and had to be taken from the field. It was later confirmed Sivo would be ruled out for the remainder of the season with an MCL injury.

=== 2021 ===
In round 2 of the 2021 NRL season, Sivo scored two tries in Parramatta's 16–12 victory over Melbourne. The following day, Sivo re-signed with Parramatta until the end of 2023.

In round 7 against Brisbane, Sivo scored a hat-trick in Parramatta's 46–6 victory over Brisbane.

The following week, he scored another two tries in Parramatta's 32–10 victory over arch-rivals Canterbury-Banksown.

In round 13 against Newcastle, he scored two tries including the 50th try of his career in a 40–4 victory.

In round 14, Sivo scored a try but was later sent to the sin bin for a high tackle on Wests Tigers player Adam Doueihi in a 40–12 victory. Sivo was later suspended for one match over the incident.

On 24 August, Sivo was ruled out for the remainder of the season after suffering an ACL injury in the club's round 23 victory over North Queensland.

=== 2022 ===
After spending two weeks in the NSW Cup to regain match fitness, Sivo made his return to the Parramatta side in round 14 of the 2022 NRL season against arch-rivals Canterbury. Parramatta would go on to lose the match 34–4 in an upset defeat. In round 19, Sivo scored two tries for Parramatta in a 36–14 loss against Brisbane. The following week, Sivo scored two tries for Parramatta in their 34–10 upset victory over Penrith. In round 21, Sivo scored a further two tries in Parramatta's 36–20 victory over Manly. In the 2022 preliminary final, Sivo scored the winning try for Parramatta in their 24–20 upset victory over North Queensland which sent the club into their first grand final since 2009. Sivo played for Parramatta in their 2022 NRL Grand Final loss to Penrith. In the second half of the match, Sivo dropped the ball over the line when the score was 22–0 in favour of Penrith. Penrith would score only minutes later to make it 28–0 before winning the match 28–12. In the second group stage match of the 2021 Rugby League World Cup, Sivo scored two tries for Fiji in their 60–4 victory over Italy.

=== 2023 ===
On 1 March, Sivo signed a contract extension to remain at Parramatta until the end of 2025. In round 2 of the 2023 NRL season, Sivo scored two tries in a 30–26 loss against Cronulla. The following week, he scored two tries for Parramatta in their 34–30 loss against Manly at Brookvale Oval. In round 6, Sivo scored two tries for Parramatta in their 28–22 victory over bottom placed Wests Tigers. In round 7, Sivo scored two tries for Parramatta as they defeated arch-rivals Canterbury 30–4. In round 10, Sivo scored a hat-trick in Parramatta's 26–24 loss to Gold Coast. Following Parramatta's victory over the Gold Coast in round 20 of the competition, Sivo was handed a four-match suspension for a careless high tackle during the game. In round 26, Sivo scored four tries for Parramatta in their upset 32–18 victory over Penrith. Sivo played a total of 20 matches for Parramatta in the 2023 NRL season and scored 20 tries as the club finished 10th and missed the finals. Sivo finished as the clubs leading try scorer.

=== 2024 ===
On 28 February, it was announced that Sivo would be suspended and miss the opening three matches of the 2024 NRL season in relation to a high tackle he performed on the Gold Coast's AJ Brimson during Parramatta's pre-season trial victory. Sivo returned to the Parramatta team in round 4 of the 2024 NRL season, scoring a try in the clubs 17–16 upset loss against the Wests Tigers. The following week, Sivo scored two tries but was found out defensively numerous times in the clubs 41–8 loss against Canberra. On 9 April, Sivo was demoted to reserve grade after two indifferent performances to start the year. In round 8, Sivo was recalled to the Parramatta team for their game against Manly. Sivo scored a hat-trick in the match but was sin binned for a professional foul when the score was 20–18 in Manly's favour. Video replays showed Sivo deliberately hitting a prone Reuben Garrick with an elbow. Manly would go on to win the game 32–18. In round 12, Sivo became the fourth highest try scorer in Parramatta's history overtaking Steve Ella as he scored two tries in the clubs 42–26 loss against South Sydney. The following week, Sivo scored two tries in Parramatta's upset 34–22 victory over top of the table Cronulla. On 3 July, it was announced that Sivo would be ruled out for six weeks with a hamstring injury. In round 26, Sivo scored a hat-trick in Parramatta's 44–40 victory over St. George Illawarra. The following week, Sivo scored two tries in Parramatta's 60–26 victory over the Wests Tigers in what the media dubbed the fixture as the "Spoon Bowl" game. Sivo finished as the clubs top try scorer with 17 tries in twelve games as the club ended up 15th on the table.

On 23 October, it was announced by the Parramatta Eels that Sivo had been granted an immediate release from his contract for 2025 to pursue other opportunities, allowing him to further his career elsewhere. On 26 October, Sivo signed a three-year deal to join English side Leeds. Sivo had stated in an interview with Brad Walter that he would not play for another team in the NRL as the Eels were like his second home.

=== 2025 ===
On 27 January, it was announced that Sivo had torn his ACL and would be ruled out for the entire Super League season.

=== 2026 ===
In round 2 of the 2026 Super League season, Sivo made his club debut for Leeds against York scoring two tries in a 46–14 victory. The following week, Sivo scored four tries in Leeds 58–6 victory over Hull Kingston Rovers at the Allegiant Stadium in Las Vegas. In round 6, Sivo scored a hat-trick in Leeds 26–22 victory over Warrington. In round 10, Sivo would score another hat-trick for Leeds against Wakefield Trinity. In round 15, he would emulate this with another hat-trick against Warrington. On 26 July, it was announced Sivo would be ruled out for an indefinite period with an arm injury.

== Statistics ==
Year	Team	Games	Tries	Pts
2019	Parramatta Eels	25	22	88
2020	Parramatta Eels	21	15	60
2021	Parramatta Eels	21	17	68
2022	Parramatta Eels	16	13	52
2023	Parramatta Eels	20	20	80
2024	Parramatta Eels	12	17	68
2026	Leeds Rhinos	21	31	124
2027	Leeds Rhinos			
Totals		136	135	540
