= Clinton Gutherson =

Australian rugby league footballer

Clint Gutherson

Personal information
- Full name: Clinton Gutherson
- Born: 9 September 1994 (age 32) Mona Vale, New South Wales, Australia
- Height: 190 cm (6 ft 3 in)
- Weight: 96 kg (15 st 2 lb)

Playing information
- Position: Fullback, Five-eighth, Wing, Centre
Club
| Years | Team | Pld | T | G | FG | P |
|---|---|---|---|---|---|---|
| 2013–15 | Manly Sea Eagles | 5 | 4 | 0 | 0 | 16 |
| 2016–24 | Parramatta Eels | 206 | 96 | 152 | 1 | 689 |
| 2025– | St. George Illawarra | 41 | 10 | 0 | 0 | 40 |
| | Total | 252 | 110 | 152 | 1 | 745 |
Representative
| Years | Team | Pld | T | G | FG | P |
| 2016–17 | City Origin | 2 | 0 | 3 | 0 | 6 |
| 2019 | Prime Minister's XIII | 1 | 3 | 0 | 0 | 12 |
| 2019 | Australia 9s | 5 | 1 | 2 | 0 | 8 |
| 2020–23 | New South Wales | 4 | 0 | 0 | 0 | 0 |
- Source: As of 22 November 2026

Clinton Gutherson (born 9 September 1994) is an Australian professional rugby league footballer who plays as a fullback for and is the co-captain of the St. George Illawarra Dragons in the National Rugby League.

He previously played for the Parramatta Eels, Manly Warringah Sea Eagles in the NRL, and has played for New South Wales, City Origin side and the Prime Minister's XIII.

Gutherson is affectionately known as "Gutho" or "King Gutho" by fans and by sections of the media. The nickname was coined by rugby league immortal Andrew Johns while he was commentating on games for Channel 9 back in 2017. He played as a five-eighth, winger and centre earlier in his career.

== Early life ==
Gutherson was born in Mona Vale, New South Wales, Australia.

Growing up, he played rugby union and played his junior rugby league for the Cromer Kingfishers, before being signed by the Manly Warringah Sea Eagles.

== Playing career ==
=== Early career ===
On 25 February 2012, Gutherson re-signed with the Manly Warringah Sea Eagles on a two-year contract. In 2012 and 2013, he played for the Sea Eagles' NYC team. In August 2012, he played for the Australian Schoolboys.

=== 2013 ===
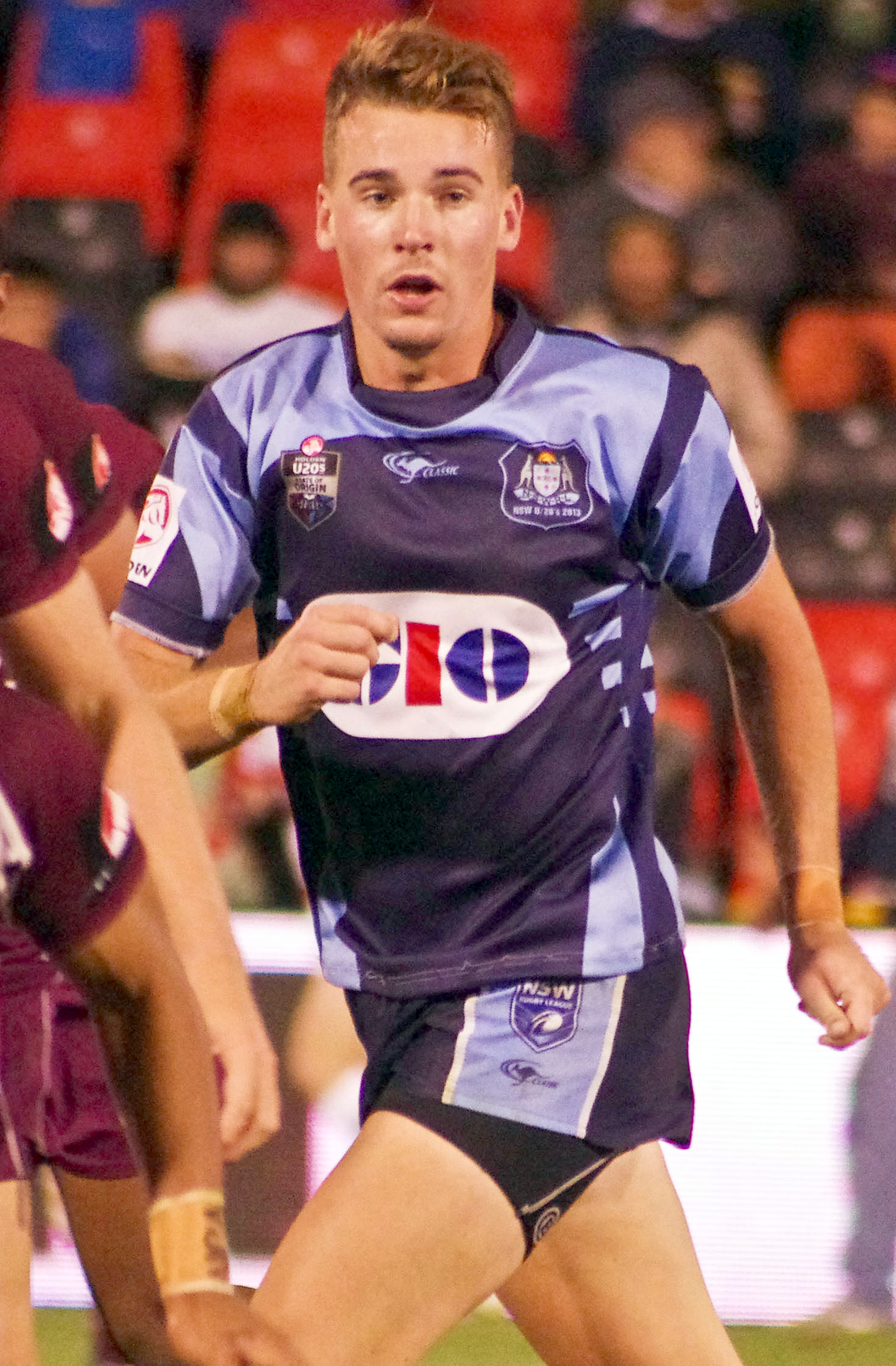
Gutherson playing for the New South Wales Under 20s in 2013

On 20 April, he played for the New South Wales under-20s team against the Queensland under-20s team. In round 26 of the 2013 NRL season, he made his NRL debut for Manly-Warringah against the Penrith Panthers, scoring a try on debut.

=== 2014 ===
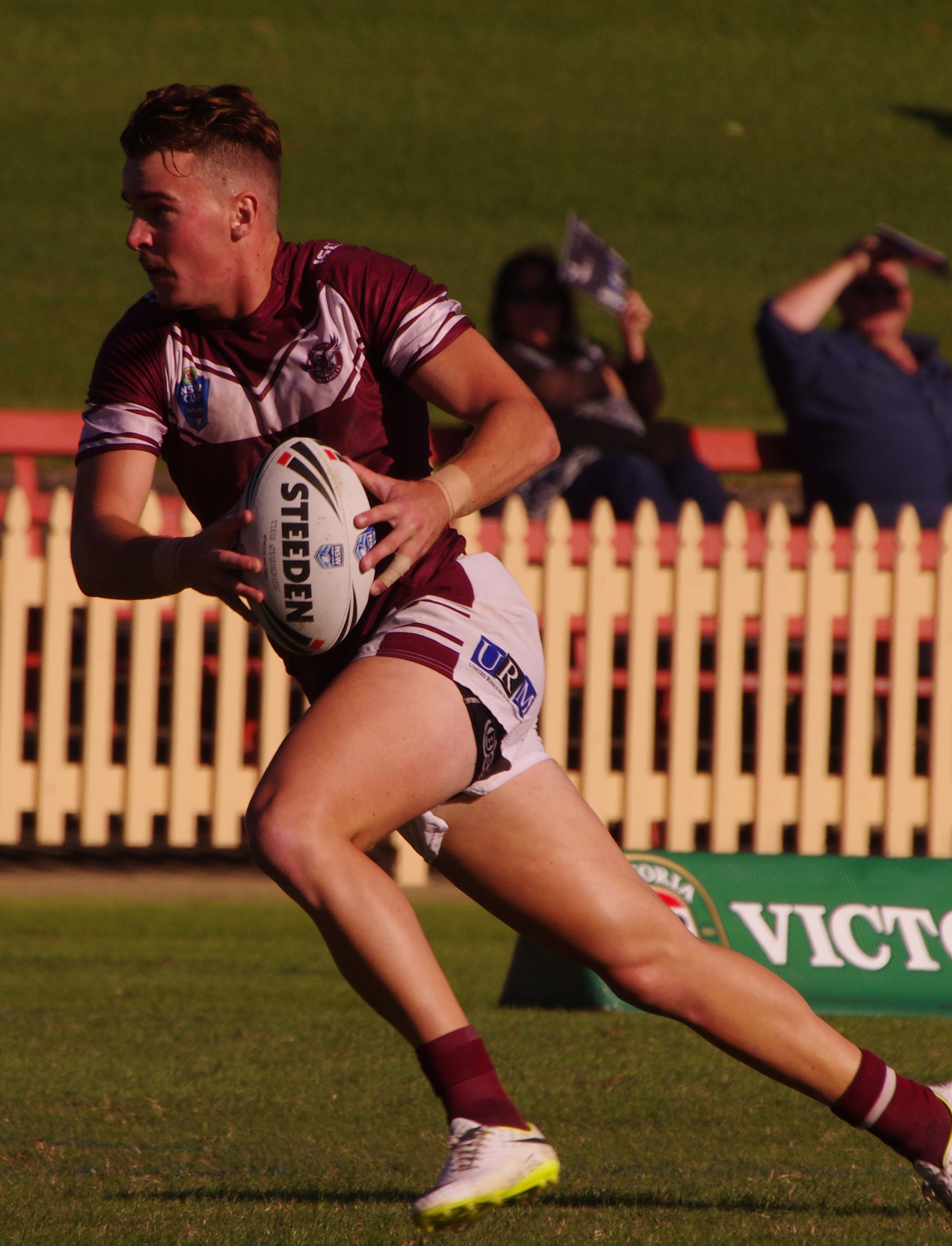
Gutherson playing for the Sea Eagles in 2014

On 3 May, Gutherson again played for the New South Wales Under-20s team against the Queensland Under-20s team. On 9 July, he played for the New South Wales Residents against the Queensland Residents. His season suffered a setback when he broke a bone in his right foot during Sea Eagles' 40–8 win over the Wests Tigers at Brookvale Oval in Round 18. He made his return to the side as a late replacement for regular fullback Brett Stewart in Round 26, though with Stewart's return, he was overlooked for the NRL Finals series. He finished off the 2014 season having played three games for Manly-Warringah, scoring a try in each game. On 21 September, he was named as the 18th-man reserve in the 2014 NSW Cup Team of the Year. On 18 October 2014, he played for the Junior Kangaroos against the Junior Kiwis.

=== 2015 ===
A shoulder injury to international centre Steve Matai saw Gutherson selected in the centres for Manly's opening game of the 2015 NRL season against the Parramatta Eels at Parramatta Stadium. He only lasted 13 minutes and 37 seconds of the game before he ruptured the Anterior cruciate ligament in his right knee. Later scans confirmed the anterior cruciate ligament (ACL) knee injury and he was ruled out for the remainder of the season. On 28 April, he re-signed with Manly-Warringah on a two-year contract. However, on 27 September, he was released from the final two years of his contract, making him a free agent for 2016, due to salary cap pressure at Manly-Warringah. On 3 November, he signed a two-year contract with the Parramatta Eels starting in 2016.

=== 2016 ===
Gutherson represented City Origin in 2016, playing at fullback in their 44–30 win over Country Origin. On 20 December, it was announced that Parramatta had re-signed Gutherson to a three-year contract that will see him at the club until the end of 2019.

=== 2017 ===
2017 would prove to be Gutherson's best year yet as he put in a number of good performances throughout the season while switching between Fullback, Centre, and the halves. Some notable performances include scoring two tries in a 26–6 victory over North Queensland, scoring a double against St George in a 24–10 victory. In Round 20 Gutherson scored a try plus setting up another in Parramatta's 17–16 victory over Wests Tigers. This match would prove to be Gutherson's last of the season as he was taken off the field with an injury which was later to be revealed as a season ending ACL knee injury.

Despite an abrupt end to the season, Gutherson won the Provan-Summons Medal for people's favourite NRL player in 2017.

=== 2018 ===
After the ACL knee injury, Gutherson returned first grade in round 7, played at fullback against his old club Manly, scoring a try. In round 8 against the West Tigers, he played his 50th NRL game in the Eels' 24–22 win. On 11 May, Parramatta were leading arch rivals Canterbury 12–8 going into the second half. Towards the end of the game, Canterbury put through a grubber kick and Gutherson tried to kick the ball out of play but missed completely and Canterbury scored a try. Canterbury went on to win the game and Gutherson made a public apology to the fans in the aftermath, saying "It's shattering, You work so hard and it comes down to that play and I didn't make it. I take the loss on me. As a player, that's what you do. There were tears in the sheds. It's heartbreaking. You put everything into the game and you come out with nothing. We're bottom of the table.". Gutherson ended 2018 with 19 appearances for Parramatta shifting between Fullback, Centre and Five-Eighth as the club endured a horror year on and off the field finishing last on the table and claiming its 14th wooden spoon. Gutherson was also made a co captain of the club in 2018. With the Eels without any obvious leaders, due to his reported admirable leadership qualities and excellent attitude when training Gutherson was made the on field captain with Tim Mannah handling media duties.

=== 2019 ===
At the start of the 2019 season, Gutherson was named captain of the Parramatta side and the first choice fullback ahead of Bevan French. In Round 2, Gutherson scored 2 tries as Parramatta defeated arch rivals Canterbury 36–16. On 16 May 2019, Gutherson re-signed with Parramatta until the end of the 2022 season.

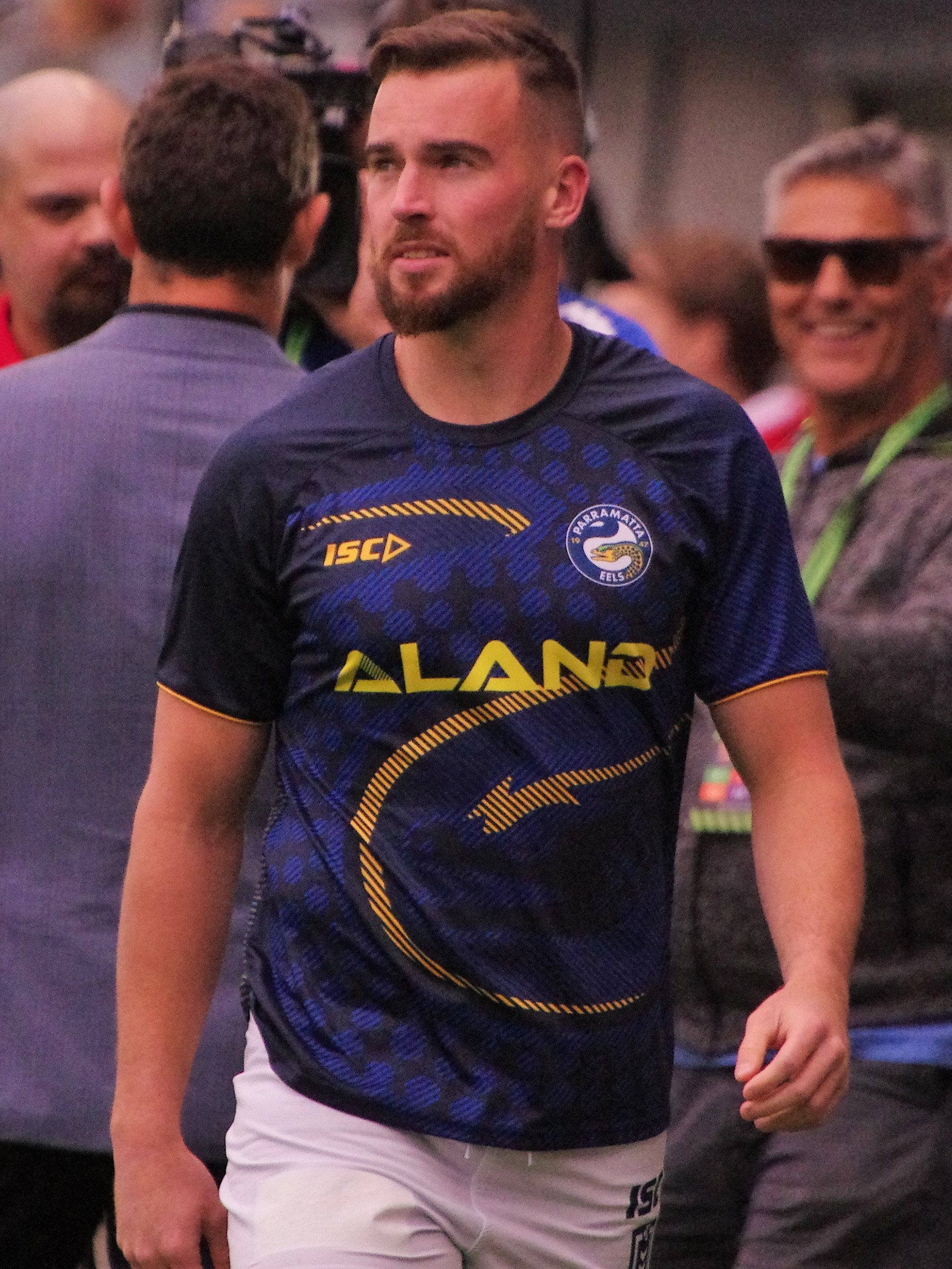
Gutherson pre-game for the Eels in 2019

Gutherson made a total of 26 appearances for Parramatta in the 2019 NRL season as the club finished 5th on the table and qualified for the finals. Gutherson played in both finals game for Parramatta as they defeated Brisbane 58–0 in week one of the finals. The following week, Parramatta were defeated by Melbourne 32–0 at AAMI Park in the elimination semi final.

On 30 September, Gutherson was named in the Australia PM XIII side at Fullback.

=== 2020 ===
In round 7 of the 2020 NRL season, Gutherson kicked his first career field goal as Parramatta defeated Canberra 25–24 in golden point extra-time at Bankwest Stadium.

In round 12, Gutherson scored two tries as Parramatta defeated arch rivals Canterbury-Bankstown 18–16 at ANZ Stadium.

In round 19, Gutherson scored two tries in a 26–12 victory over Brisbane at Bankwest Stadium.

At the end of the 2020 regular season, Parramatta finished in third place and qualified for the finals. Gutherson played in both finals matches and scored two tries in week two of the finals against South Sydney where Parramatta lead 18–8 at half-time before capitulating in the second half to lose 38–24.

The following week, Gutherson was named in the New South Wales State of Origin preliminary squad and won the Ken Thornett medal as Parramatta's player of the year.

On 4 November, Gutherson made his State of Origin debut for NSW, playing at centre in the 18–14 loss to Queensland in game 1. Gutherson played in all three games for New South Wales in the 2020 State of Origin series as they suffered a surprise 2–1 series defeat against Queensland.

=== 2021 ===
In round 8 of the 2021 NRL season, Gutherson scored two tries in a man of the match performance as Parramatta defeated arch-rivals Canterbury-Bankstown 32–10.

In round 14, he scored two tries for Parramatta in a 40–12 victory over the Wests Tigers.

Gutherson played 25 games for Parramatta in the 2021 NRL season and scored 13 tries. He played in both of the club's finals matches as they were eliminated in the second week of the finals against Penrith. It was the third straight season that Parramatta had been eliminated at this stage of the competition.

On 19 November, Gutherson ended months of speculation regarding his future by signing a three-year contract extension with Parramatta worth $2.3 million.

=== 2022 ===
In round 5 of the 2022 NRL season, Gutherson scored two tries for Parramatta in a 26–20 victory over the Gold Coast. In round 11, Gutherson played his 150th first grade game in Parramatta's 22–20 victory over Manly. On 19 June, Gutherson was selected by New South Wales for game two of the 2022 State of Origin series. In round 16, Gutherson scored two tries in a 30–12 loss against South Sydney. In round 24, Gutherson scored two tries for Parramatta in a 53–6 victory over Brisbane. Gutherson played every game for Parramatta throughout 2022 including the clubs Grand Final loss to Penrith. Gutherson scored a second half try in the match as Parramatta lost 28–12.

=== 2023 ===
In round 3 of the 2023 NRL season, Gutherson scored two tries against his former club Manly in a 34–30 loss. In round 9, Gutherson scored his first career hat-trick in Parramatta's 43–12 victory over Newcastle. In round 15, Gutherson scored a hat-trick in Parramatta's 34–12 victory over arch-rivals Canterbury. In round 17, Gutherson scored two tries for Parramatta in their 48–20 victory over the Dolphins. On 3 July, Gutherson was announced as a surprise selection for New South Wales ahead of their match in game 3 of the 2023 State of Origin series. Gutherson played off the interchange bench in game 3 of the series, coming on the field with three minutes left to play as New South Wales won 24–10 and avoided Queensland recording a clean sweep. In round 26, Gutherson scored two tries for Parramatta in their 32–18 upset victory over Penrith. On 29 August, Gutherson was awarded the Ken Thornett Medal after he was voted Parramatta's player of the season. Gutherson also claimed the Nathan Hindmarsh Players' Player Award and Blue & Gold Army Award. Gutherson played a total of 23 games for Parramatta in the season and scored 19 tries as the club finished 10th on the table.

=== 2024 ===
In round 4 of the 2024 NRL season, Gutherson scored a try and kicked four goals in Parramatta's upset 17–16 loss against the Wests Tigers. He missed a penalty goal after the full-time siren which would have won the match for Parramatta. On 30 April, it was announced that Gutherson would be ruled out from playing for a month after having surgery on his knee. Gutherson had been playing with the knee injury for the opening eight weeks of the competition. He made his return in the round 13 win over Cronulla, Parrmatta's first win in five weeks. In round 14, Gutherson played his 200th first grade game in Parramatta's 22–18 loss against arch-rivals Canterbury. In round 21, Gutherson played his 200th game for Parramatta in their loss to Melbourne. Gutherson became only the 13th Parramatta player to reach 200 games with the club. In round 23, Gutherson scored two tries and kicked five goals in Parramatta's 36–34 loss against Penrith. Parramatta had led the game 34-20 until Penrith came back to make it 36–34. Gutherson had the chance to tie the game with a late penalty goal but missed which was reminiscent of his miss earlier in the year against the Wests Tigers. In round 26, Gutherson scored two tries in Parramatta's 44–40 victory over St. George Illawarra. The following week, Gutherson scored two tries in the final round of the season against the Wests Tigers in which the media dubbed the game "the spoon bowl". Parramatta would win the match 60–22. Gutherson finished the 2024 season as the clubs top point scorer with 112 points. Parramatta would finish in 15th place on the table. On 10 October, it was revealed that the Parramatta club had given Gutherson permission to negotiate with other clubs after he was informed that there would be no contract extension offered beyond the 2025 NRL season. On 7 November, Gutherson was officially released by the Parramatta club. On 8 November, Gutherson signed a three-year deal with St. George Illawarra from 2025 onwards.

=== 2025 ===
Gutherson in 2026

On 13 January, Gutherson alongside Damien Cook were named co-captains at St. George Illawarra for the 2025 NRL season. In round 1 of the 2025 NRL season, Gutherson made his club debut for St. George Illawarra in their 28-20 loss against Canterbury. In round 5, Gutherson scored two tries for St. George Illawarra against his former club Parramatta. St. George Illawarra would lose the match 23-22 in golden point extra-time. In round 11, Gutherson scored two tries for St. George Illawarra in their 30-26 victory over Brisbane. Gutherson played every game for St. George Illawarra in the 2025 NRL season as the club finished 15th on the table. In September, Gutherson won St. George Illawarra's player of the season award and Red V Members Player of the Year.

=== 2026 ===
Gutherson played 17 matches for St. George Illawarra in the 2026 NRL season as the club finished with the Wooden Spoon. It was the clubs first wooden spoon and the first any St. George affiliated side had received since 1938.

== Statistics ==
| Year | Team | Games | Tries | Goals | FGs | Pts |
|---|---|---|---|---|---|---|
| 2013 | Manly Warringah Sea Eagles | 1 | 1 | | | 4 |
| 2014 | Manly Warringah Sea Eagles | 3 | 3 | | | 12 |
| 2015 | Manly Warringah Sea Eagles | 1 | | | | |
| 2016 | Parramatta Eels | 24 | 5 | 1 | | 22 |
| 2017 | Parramatta Eels | 18 | 11 | 49 | | 142 |
| 2018 | Parramatta Eels | 19 | 6 | 10 | | 44 |
| 2019 | Parramatta Eels | 26 | 8 | | | 32 |
| 2020 | Parramatta Eels | 22 | 10 | 12 | 1 | 65 |
| 2021 | Parramatta Eels | 25 | 13 | 18 | | 88 |
| 2022 | Parramatta Eels | 28 | 15 | 8 | | 76 |
| 2023 | Parramatta Eels | 23 | 19 | 16 | | 108 |
| 2024 | Parramatta Eels | 21 | 9 | 38 | | 112 |
| 2025 | St. George Illawarra Dragons | 24 | 7 | | | 28 |
| 2026 | St. George Illawarra Dragons | 5 | 1 | | | 4 |
| | Totals | 240 | 108 | 152 | 1 | 737 |
