= Mitchell Moses =

Australia & Lebanon international rugby league footballer

Mitch Moses
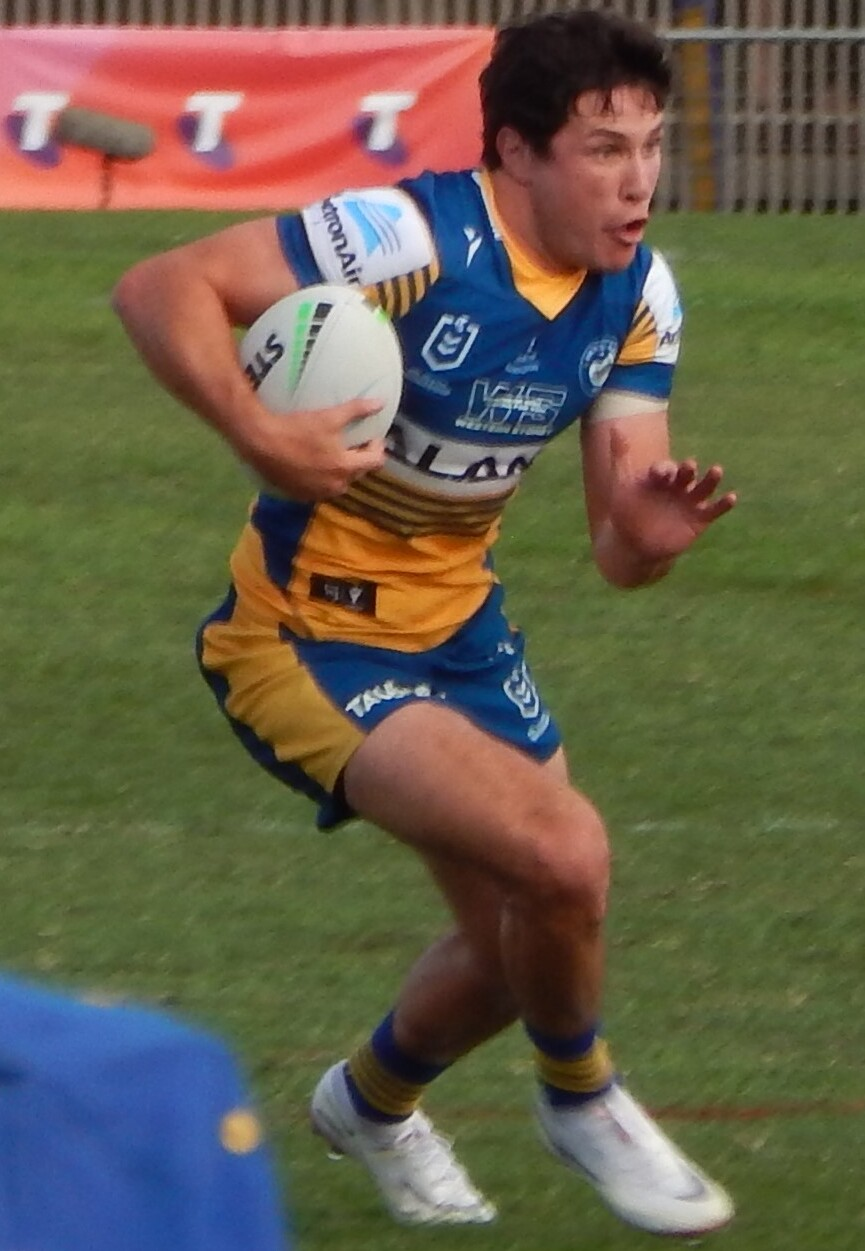

Personal information
- Full name: Mitchell Moses ميتشل موسى
- Born: 16 September 1994 (age 32)
- Height: 182 cm (6 ft 0 in)
- Weight: 87 kg (13 st 10 lb)

Playing information
- Position: Halfback, Five-eighth
Club
Years	Team	Pld	T	G	FG	P
2014–17	Wests Tigers	67	13	78	3	211
2017–	Parramatta Eels	190	42	530	12	1240
	Total	257	55	608	15	1451
Representative
Years	Team	Pld	T	G	FG	P
2016–25	Prime Minister's XIII	3	3	6	0	24
2017	World All Stars	1	0	0	0	0
2017–22	Lebanon	8	1	23	1	51
2019	Australia 9s	4	4	9	0	37
2021–26	New South Wales	8	1	0	0	4
2024–	Australia	4	1	0	0	4
- Source: As of 20 November 2026
- Relatives: Benny Elias (uncle)

Mitchell Moses (Arabic: ميتشل موسى) (born 16 September 1994) is a professional rugby league footballer who captains and plays as a halfback for the Parramatta Eels in the National Rugby League, New South Wales in the State of Origin series and has played for Australia and captained Lebanon at international level.

He previously played for the Wests Tigers in the NRL, and has represented the Prime Minister's XIII and World All Stars.

== Background ==
Moses was born in Ryde, New South Wales, Australia on 16 September 1994. He is of Lebanese descent, and is the nephew of former Balmain Tigers player Benny Elias.

Moses played his junior football for the Holy Cross Rhinos and Carlingford Cougars before being signed by the Parramatta Eels. Moses played for the Eels' Harold Matthews Cup team before being signed by the Wests Tigers. Moses later said, "I went to Parramatta and played Harold Matts there. I wanted to stay there but it's their decision and I respect it."

In 2012, Moses played for the Tigers S. G. Ball Cup team, playing in their grand final win over the Canberra Raiders alongside teammate Luke Brooks, and was named the S. G. Ball Cup Player of the Year. In 2012, Moses played for the Australian Schoolboys. In November 2012, Moses was named in the New South Wales Blues Origin Pathways Camp. Moses played for the Wests Tigers NYC team in 2013 and 2014. In August 2013, Moses re-signed with the Tigers on a 4-year contract. He said, "It wasn't the case that I only stayed because Luke did, but I definitely think I play my best football alongside him."

== Playing career ==
=== 2014 ===
In February, Moses was selected in the Wests Tigers inaugural Auckland Nines squad. In May, he played for the New South Wales in the Under 20s State of Origin match at Penrith Stadium. A late selection at halfback after Luke Brooks withdrew, Moses contributed to four tries in the victory, and was said to have, "directed the team superbly," as they won 30-8. A few days later, he was suspended for 2 matches for calling Luke Bateman a "fucking gay cunt" during the match. Moses had been slated to make his NRL debut the next weekend, but was unable to be selected due to his suspension.

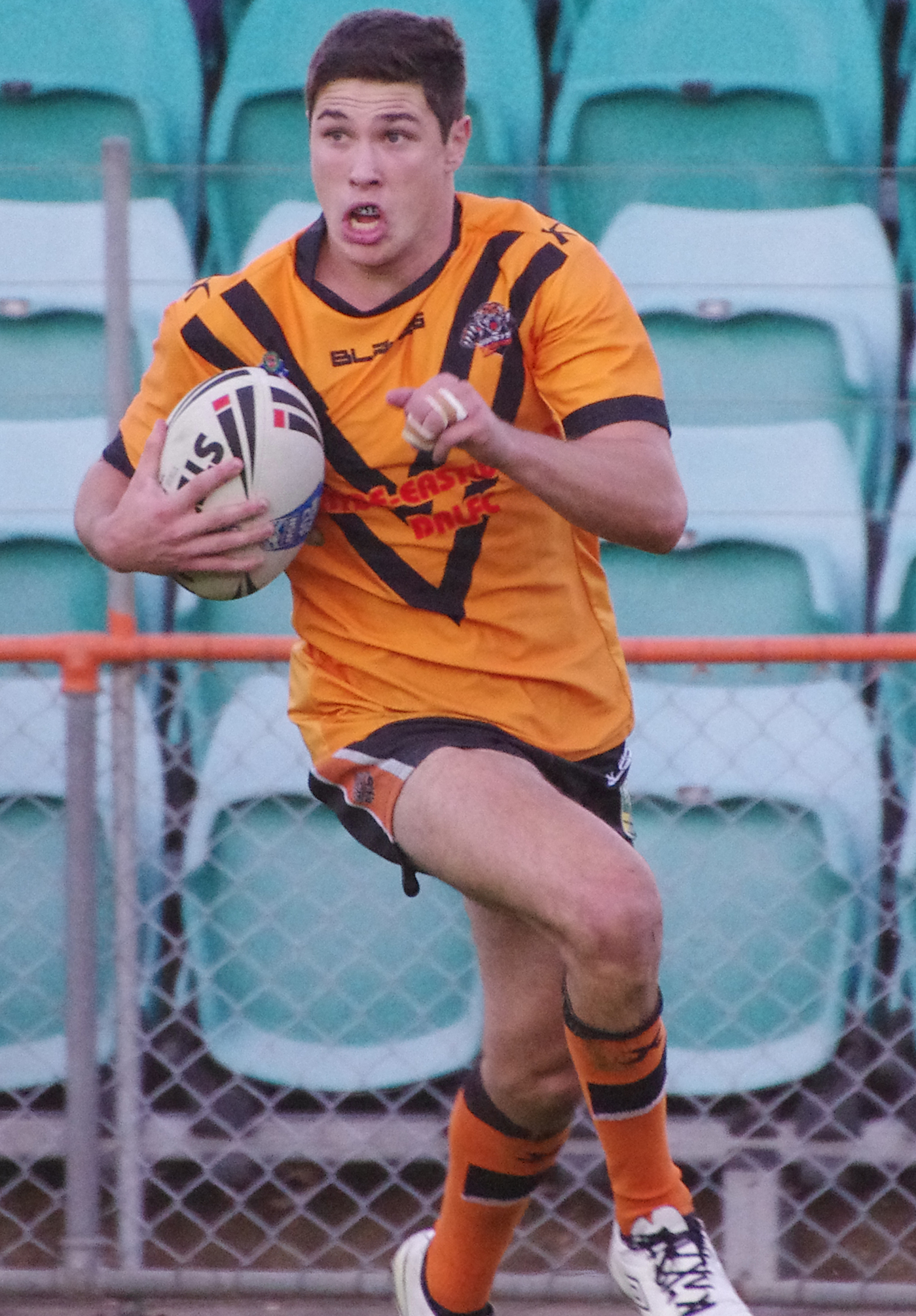
Moses playing for the Tigers in 2014

In round 17 of the 2014 NRL season, Moses made his NRL debut for the Wests Tigers against the Penrith Panthers at Leichhardt Oval at fullback in the Tigers 26-10 loss. In the Tigers last match of the season against the Cronulla-Sutherland Sharks in Round 26, Moses scored his first NRL try in the Tigers 26-10 win at Leichhardt Oval. Moses finished his debut year with 1 try and 2 goals in 10 matches. He made his first 6 NRL appearances at fullback before moving into the halves. It was noted that his first year was "a tough start to life in first-grade for the local junior, particularly as the club imploded on and off the field".

=== 2015 ===
Moses joined Luke Brooks in the halves for 2015. Moses struggled early in the season under the more structured play of new coach Jason Taylor. He said, "I definitely was feeling a little bit frustrated at the start of the year and a bit low on confidence. I'm a freestyle player. That's how I play footy and coming into the structure that JT has bought – now, I don't mind it. It's a good learning curve for me to play to a structure while also being given that freedom of play whenever I see something to take it up." Moses scored his first double in round 15, scoring Wests Tigers' first and last try against Manly. Playing in every game for the year at five-eighth, he was one of three Wests Tigers with 12 or more line-break assists.

=== 2016 ===
With the absence of Robbie Farah and Luke Brooks, Moses was the Tigers' key playmaker for the season opener in Round 1 against the New Zealand Warriors. He was said to have given a "first-half masterclass" as he set up 3 "spectacular" tries during the 34-26 win. Coach Taylor said, "He was such a rookie this time last year. He ran the team for us today, which is a really big step for him." Moses also took over the team's goal-kicking duties, kicking five conversions. He would share goal-kicking with Jordan Rankin as the season progressed. After Robbie Farah was dropped to reserve grade towards the end of the year, it was said, "A large reason for the Tigers' success over the past six weeks has been the form of five-eighth Mitchell Moses, who has been the club's best player over that period." Phil Gould named him as his five-eighth of the year, saying, "His back half of the season has been as good as any player in the game and he only appears to be getting better." Moses finished the season as the club's highest pointscorer with 113 points by scoring 6 tries, 43 goals and 3 field goals in 23 matches. On 7 September, Moses was awarded as the Tigers "Player of the Year". On 24 September, Moses made his representative debut with the Prime Minister's XIII against Papua New Guinea, scoring 3 tries and kicking 4 goals in the 58-0 thrashing win in Port Moresby.

=== 2017 ===
In February, Moses played for the World All Stars against the Indigenous All Stars, starting at five-eighth. Early in the season, Moses, alongside Tigers captain Aaron Woods, halves partner Luke Brooks and fullback James Tedesco, attracted media attention as their contracts all expired at the end of the year. Moses signed a 3-year deal with the Parramatta Eels, starting from 2018. He then asked for an early release from the club to join the Eels, but was denied by the Tigers. After fulltime of the match in round 9, at Leichhardt Oval, a can of beer was thrown onto the field nearly hitting players. Moses was thought to be the intended target of the projectile. On 16 May, he was released from his contract to join the Eels. Moses played in 10 matches, scored 3 tries and kicked 28 goals for the Tigers before switching over to Parramatta.

On May 20, Moses made his Eels debut at halfback in a 16-22 loss to the Canberra Raiders. June 29, Moses kicked a field goal in golden point to win the match against Canterbury 13-12. On 8 July, he scored his first try for Parramatta in a 22-6 victory over Melbourne. The Eels finished 4th and made their first appearance in the finals since the 2009 NRL Grand Final. Moses played at halfback in the Eels losses to the Melbourne Storm and North Queensland Cowboys as they stumbled out of the finals, the first top 4 team since Manly in 2014 to go out in straight defeats. Moses played in all 26 games of the season, 10 for Wests Tigers and 16 for the Eels, scoring 4 tries, kicking 59 goals and 1 field goal.

Moses was selected as vice-captain of the 24-man squad for Lebanon for the 2017 Rugby League World Cup. In the first pool match against France, Moses had an outstanding match, scoring a try, kicking 4 goals and a field goal in the 29-18 win at Canberra Stadium. Even though Lebanon lost their 3 other pool matches against more experienced teams England, Australia and Tonga, Moses was named at five-eighth in the Team of the Tournament. He played in all 4 matches, scoring 1 try and kicking 8 goals and 1 field goal.

=== 2018 ===
On 5 May, Moses missed a conversion from the sideline which would have taken the game to extra time. With seven minutes remaining in the match against Cronulla, Parramatta were losing 22-4 when they scored three late tries to make it 22-20 on the full time siren with Moses getting the last try. On 2 June, Moses suffered a knee injury. It was initially thought that he had suffered a posterior cruciate ligament injury but scans showed no major damage was done and instead he would miss 2-3 matches. On 19 July, Moses scored the match-winning try in Parramatta's 14-8 victory over arch rivals Canterbury, which the media dubbed the "spoon bowl" as the teams were sitting second last and last on the ladder. In Round 25, Moses was sent to the sin bin for the third time in the season in Parramatta's 44-10 loss against the Sydney Roosters.

At season's end, Moses was told by Parramatta he was free to join another club. He said, "I'm not sure who wanted me or didn't want me. I'm not going to lie it was upsetting to hear that straight away after the season." Moses remained at the club, with halves partner Corey Norman leaving.

=== 2019 ===
In Round 6, Moses was the first player to score a try, conversion and field goal in the first NRL match played at the new Bankwest Stadium in which Parramatta defeated Wests Tigers 51-6. The first try to be officially scored at the new stadium was by teammate Bevan French who crossed for the Wentworthville Magpies against Western Suburbs in the Canterbury Cup NSW match played before the main game.

On June 8, Moses signed a three-year deal worth $2.5 million, keeping him at the club until the end of the 2022 season.

At the end of the 2019 NRL season, Parramatta finished in 5th place on the table and qualified for the finals. Moses finished the regular season as the competition's leading try assist maker. In the elimination final against Brisbane, Moses scored 2 tries and kicked 6 goals as Parramatta won the match 58-0 at the new Western Sydney Stadium. The victory was the biggest finals win in history, eclipsing Newtown's 55-7 win over St George in 1944. The match was also Parramatta's biggest win over Brisbane and Brisbane's worst ever loss since entering the competition in 1988.

On 30 September, Moses was named at halfback for the Australia PM XIII side. He was named as the 2019 halfback of the year at the Dally M Awards.

=== 2020 ===
In round 2 Moses scored a try and kicked nine goals as Parramatta defeated the Gold Coast 46-6.

In round 11, Moses returned from injury against the Wests Tigers and scored an amazing solo try as he chipped the ball over the Wests defence and scored under the posts as Parramatta won the match 26-16 at Bankwest Stadium.

At the end of the 2020 regular season, Parramatta finished third on the table and qualified for the finals. After a 36-24 loss against Melbourne in the qualifying final, Parramatta played against South Sydney in the elimination final at Bankwest Stadium. With the score in Souths favour at 20-18, Moses had a penalty kick from directly in front of the posts to level the scores at 20-20. Moses proceeded to miss the conversion with the ball striking the post. South Sydney would capture the rebound and run down the other end of the field to score a try. Parramatta would go on to lose 38-24 eliminating them from the competition.

=== 2021 ===
In round 6 of the 2021 NRL season, he kicked five goals and one field goal in Parramatta's 35-10 victory over Canberra.

Moses re-signed with Parramatta until the end of 2024.

In round 14, Moses scored a try and kicked seven goals as Parramatta defeated Wests Tigers 40-12. In the first half of the match, Moses knocked the ball on in the Wests Tigers in goal when he looked certain to score. It was described as the "Bombed try of the year".

In round 16, Moses missed a penalty goal attempt after the full-time siren against Penrith which would have won the match for Parramatta but the conversion was unsuccessful and Penrith would hold on for a 13-12 victory.

Moses was selected for the NSW Blues as halfback for the third State of Origin game in the 2021 series. It was the first time Moses had represented NSW and his selection came off the back of an injury to Penrith halfback Nathan Cleary in the second game of the series. New South Wales would go on to lose game 3 20-18 against Queensland with Moses providing two try assists in the match.

On 20 July, it was announced that Moses would be ruled out from playing for an indefinite period after sustaining a back fracture in game 3 of the 2021 State of Origin series. Moses played a total of 22 games for Parramatta in the 2021 NRL season including both of the club's finals matches against Newcastle and Penrith. Parramatta were eliminated from the second week of the finals by Penrith in a tough 8-6 loss. It was the third season in a row that Parramatta had been eliminated from the finals at that stage in the competition.

=== 2022 ===
In round 4 of the 2022 NRL season, Moses scored two tries and kicked eight goals in a man of the match performance as Parramatta defeated St. George 48-14. In round 14 of the 2022 NRL season, Moses provided one of the bombed tries of the season against arch-rivals Canterbury. With Parramatta down by 24 points and less than ten minutes to play, Moses broke through the Canterbury line and nonchalantly looked to put the ball down for a try but was unaware Canterbury player Matt Burton was behind him. Burton knocked the ball out of Moses hand which lead to a knock on. Canterbury would then go on to win the match 34-4. Following Parramatta's upset victory over Penrith, it was announced that Moses would be ruled out for five weeks with a broken finger. Moses was subsequently replaced by Jakob Arthur. In round 24, Moses scored a try, kicked eight goals and one drop goal in Parramatta's 53-6 victory over Brisbane. In the 2022 Qualifying Final, Moses was taken from the field in the second half after suffering a head clash in Parramatta's 27-8 loss to Penrith. The following week in the elimination semi-final, Moses starred for Parramatta scoring a try and kicking six goals in a 40-4 victory over Canberra. The result meant that Parramatta reached their first preliminary final since 2009. Moses played 26 games for Parramatta throughout 2022 including their 2022 NRL Grand Final loss to Penrith.

=== 2023 ===
In round 2 of the 2023 NRL season, Moses played his 200th first grade game in Parramatta's 30-26 loss against Cronulla. Moses scored two tries and kicked three goals in the match. In round 4 against Penrith, Moses kicked the game winning field goal during golden point extra-time as Parramatta won their first game of the season 17-16. In round 6, Moses provided four try assists in Parramatta's 28-22 victory over the bottom placed Wests Tigers. In round 10, Moses had a bad night with the goal kicking duties only converting one from four attempts. Moses was taken from the field late in the game with a head concussion during Parramatta's 24-26 loss against the Gold Coast. After months of negotiations, on 18 May, Moses re-signed with Parramatta until the end of 2026 with an option of extending the deal for a further two seasons. On 12 June, Moses was selected by New South Wales to play in game 2 of the 2023 State of Origin series after Nathan Cleary was ruled out due to an injury. Moses was retained for game 3 in which New South Wales defeated Queensland to avoid a series clean sweep. In round 20, Moses kicked a field goal with less than five minutes remaining to win the game for Parramatta 25-24 over the Gold Coast. In round 24, Moses played his 150th game for Parramatta but would suffer a fractured eye socket in the match as Parramatta lost 54-10 against Brisbane at The Gabba.

=== 2024 ===
Following Parramatta's round 3 victory over Manly, it was announced Moses would miss between 8–12 weeks with a fractured foot. After nearly three months out, Moses was named to make his return to the Parramatta team in their round 13 game against Cronulla. Parramatta would claim a 34-22 victory in the match, their first win in five weeks.

Despite showing indifferent form since his return to the Parramatta side, Moses was selected by New South Wales for game two in the 2024 State of Origin series. Moses would go on to play a Man of the Match performance as New South Wales won game two 38-18. In game three, he scored the final try for New South Wales as they won the decider 14-4. It was the first time since 2005 that a New South Wales team had won a deciding game in Brisbane. However, a ruptured bicep with 4 minutes remaining in the game would end his season. He said, "It's tough. It's bittersweet. My season is over now. I’ll focus on next year. But it’s not a bad way to go out."

=== 2025 ===
On 30 January, the Eels announced Moses as the new captain with the club also announcing the leadership group of Junior Paulo, J'maine Hopgood and Jack Williams. On 28 February, the Eels announced that Moses had re-signed with the club until 2029. The following week, it was announced that Moses would miss the first six weeks of the 2025 NRL season with a foot injury. On 15 April, Moses returned from injury and was named in Parramatta's team to play against the Wests Tigers in round 7 of the 2025 NRL season. Parramatta would go on to win the match 38-22. In May, Moses was selected by New South Wales ahead of the 2025 State of Origin series at five-eighth. Moses was retained by New South Wales for game two however he was later ruled out after suffering a calf injury in training and was ruled out for an indefinite period. On 22 July, Moses was named to make his return to the Parramatta side for their round 21 match against Brisbane. In round 23, Moses kicked the game winning field goal with less than five minutes remaining as Parramatta defeated North Queensland 19-18. In round 27, Moses scored a hat-trick as Parramatta defeated wooden spooners Newcastle 66-10.

=== 2026 ===
In round 10 of the 2026 NRL season, Moses kicked the winning field goal for Parramatta in their 33-30 golden point extra-time victory over North Queensland. In May, Moses was named for New South Wales ahead of game one in the 2026 State of Origin series. During a training exercise Moses suffered a hamstring strain and was ruled out for at least four weeks. Moses was selected by New South Wales for game two which they would lose 44-24. In round 17, Moses played his 250th first grade game in Parramatta's loss against South Sydney. Moses was retained by New South Wales for game three in the 2026 State of Origin series in which New South Wales defeated Queensland 30-12. Moses played 19 matches for Parramatta in the 2026 NRL season as the club finished 13th on the table.

== Honours ==
Individual

- Dally M Halfback of the Year: 2019
- RLWC Team of the Tournament: 2017

Parramatta Eels

- NRL Premiership Runners-Up: 2022

NSW Blues

- State of Origin: 2021, 2024, 2026

Australia

- Pacific Championships: 2024
- Rugby League World Cup Champion: 2026

== Statistics ==
Year	Team	Games	Tries	Goals	FGs	Pts
2014	Wests Tigers	10	1	2		8
2015	Wests Tigers	24	3	5		22
2016	Wests Tigers	23	6	43	3	113
2017	Wests Tigers	10	3	28		68
2017	Parramatta Eels	16	1	31	1	67
2018	Parramatta Eels	22	4	45		106
2019	Parramatta Eels	26	4	92	1	201
2020	Parramatta Eels	19	3	57	1	127
2021	Parramatta Eels	22	3	66	2	146
2022	Parramatta Eels	26	7	95	2	220
2023	Parramatta Eels	19	7	69	3	169
2024	Parramatta Eels	8	4	19		53
2025	Parramatta Eels	12	3	2	1	17
2026	Parramatta Eels	12	1	30		34
2027	Parramatta Eels					
	Totals	237	50	588	14	1352

== Personal life ==
Moses has two daughters.
