= Jake Arthur =

Australian rugby league player

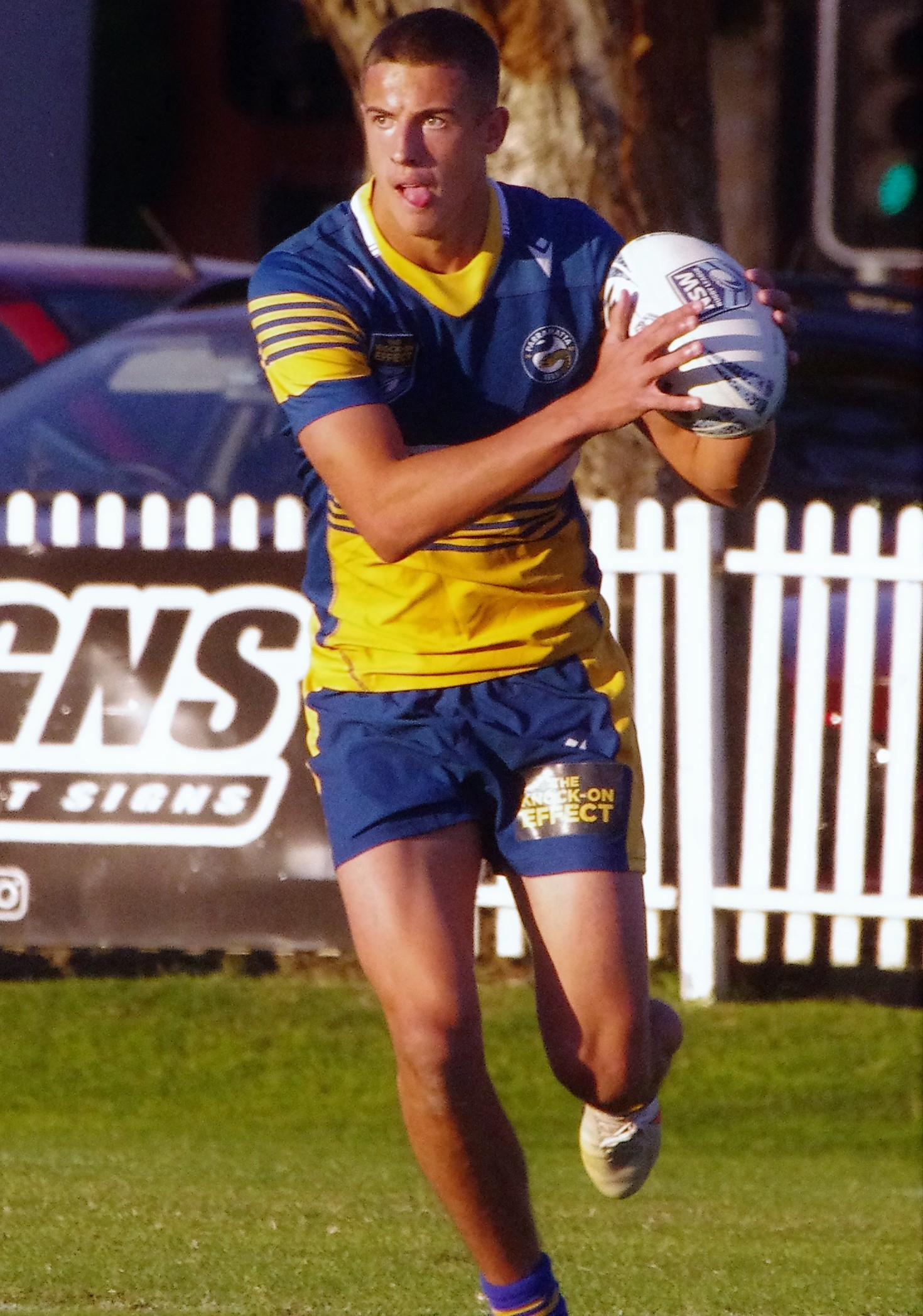

Personal information
- Full name: Jakob Arthur
- Born: 27 September 2002 (age 24) Cairns, Queensland, Australia
- Height: 6 ft 2 in (1.88 m)
- Weight: 13 st 1 lb (83 kg)

Playing information
- Position: Stand-off, Scrum-half
Club
Years	Team	Pld	T	G	FG	P
2021–23	Parramatta Eels	22	3	0	0	12
2023–25	Manly Sea Eagles	7	1	0	0	4
2025	Newcastle Knights	5	0	0	0	0
2026	Hull F.C.	25	6	0	1	25
2027–	Huddersfield Giants	0	0	0	0	0
	Total	59	10	0	1	41
- Source: As of 6 November 2026

Jakob Arthur (born 27 September 2002) is an Australian rugby league footballer who plays as a scrum-half or stand-off for the Huddersfield Giants in the Super League.

== Background ==
Arthur grew up playing for the Rouse Hill Rhinos as a Parramatta junior. He is the son of former Eels head coach Brad Arthur, and the older brother of fellow rugby league player Matthew Arthur.

== Playing career ==
=== 2021 ===
In round 10 of the 2021 NRL season, Arthur made his first grade debut for Parramatta against the New Zealand Warriors at Suncorp Stadium, scoring a try in a 34–18 win in the Magic Round. In December 2021, Arthur signed a new deal to remain at Parramatta until the end of the 2023 season.

=== 2022 ===
In round 8 of the 2022 NRL season, Arthur was controversially put at five-eighth ahead of the established Dylan Brown for Parramatta's match against North Queensland. North Queensland would end up winning the match 35–4. Arthur was subsequently demoted to the NSW Cup for the following week. In July, Arthur was booed by some sections of the Parramatta fan base before the clubs match against Brisbane at the Western Sydney Stadium. In round 21 of the 2022 NRL season, Arthur was called into the Parramatta side after Mitchell Moses was ruled out for five weeks with a broken finger. Arthur provided two assists in the game as Parramatta won 36–20 against Manly. Arthur was controversially retained on the interchange bench for Parramatta throughout the 2022 finals series. In Parramatta's upset preliminary final victory over North Queensland, Arthur was an unused substitute in the clubs 24–20 victory. In the 2022 NRL Grand Final, Arthur came onto the field with five minutes remaining and Penrith leading the match 28–0. Parramatta would score two late tries including Arthur scoring a try just before the full-time siren. On 7 October, Arthur signed a two-year contract extension to remain at Parramatta until the end of 2024.

=== 2023 ===
In round 11 of the 2023 NRL season, Arthur made his first start of the season for Parramatta in their 26–18 loss against Canberra. On 22 May, Arthur was granted an immediate release from his Parramatta contract to join rivals Manly on a two-year contract.

Arthur made his debut for Manly in round 13, playing 26 minutes off the bench in a 28–18 loss to Newcastle. On 21 September, it was announced that Arthur had signed a three-year contract extension to remain at Manly until the end of the 2025 season.

=== 2024 ===
Arthur made no appearances for Manly in the 2024 NRL season. He would instead play for the clubs reserve grade side the Blacktown Workers Sea Eagles in the NSW Cup.

=== 2025 ===
On 19 May, it was announced that Arthur had been called into the Manly side for their round 12 match against his former club Parramatta due to Daly Cherry-Evans being selected by Queensland for the 2025 State of Origin series. On 30 June, Manly confirmed that Arthur had been released from his contract to join the Newcastle Knights. In round 23 of the 2025 NRL season, Arthur made his club debut for Newcastle in their 48-12 loss against Penrith. On 28 August, it was announced that Arthur had signed a contract to join English side Hull F.C. ahead of the 2026 Super League season. Arthur made a total of five appearances for Newcastle towards the back end of the season as Newcastle finished with the Wooden Spoon. Arthur's final game for the club was a 66-10 loss against one of his former teams in Parramatta.

=== 2026 ===
Arthur made his club debut for Hull F.C. in round 3 of the Challenge Cup where he scored a try in Hull's 60-0 win over Salford. On 28 August, it was announced that Arthur would be leaving at the end of the season after not being offered a new contract by the club.

On 9 September 2026 it was reported that he had signed for Huddersfield Giants in the Super League on a 2-year deal.

== Statistics ==
Year	Team	Games	Tries	DG	Pts
2021	Parramatta Eels	7	2	0	8
2022	Parramatta Eels	14	1	0	4
2023	Parramatta Eels	1	0	0	0
2023	Manly Warringah Sea Eagles	6	1	0	4
2025	Manly Warringah Sea Eagles	1	0	0	0
2025	Newcastle Knights	5	0	0	0
2026	Hull FC	25	6	1	25
2027	Huddersfield Giants	0	0	0	0
	Totals	59	10	1	41

source;
