= Oregon Kaufusi =

Samoa international rugby league footballer

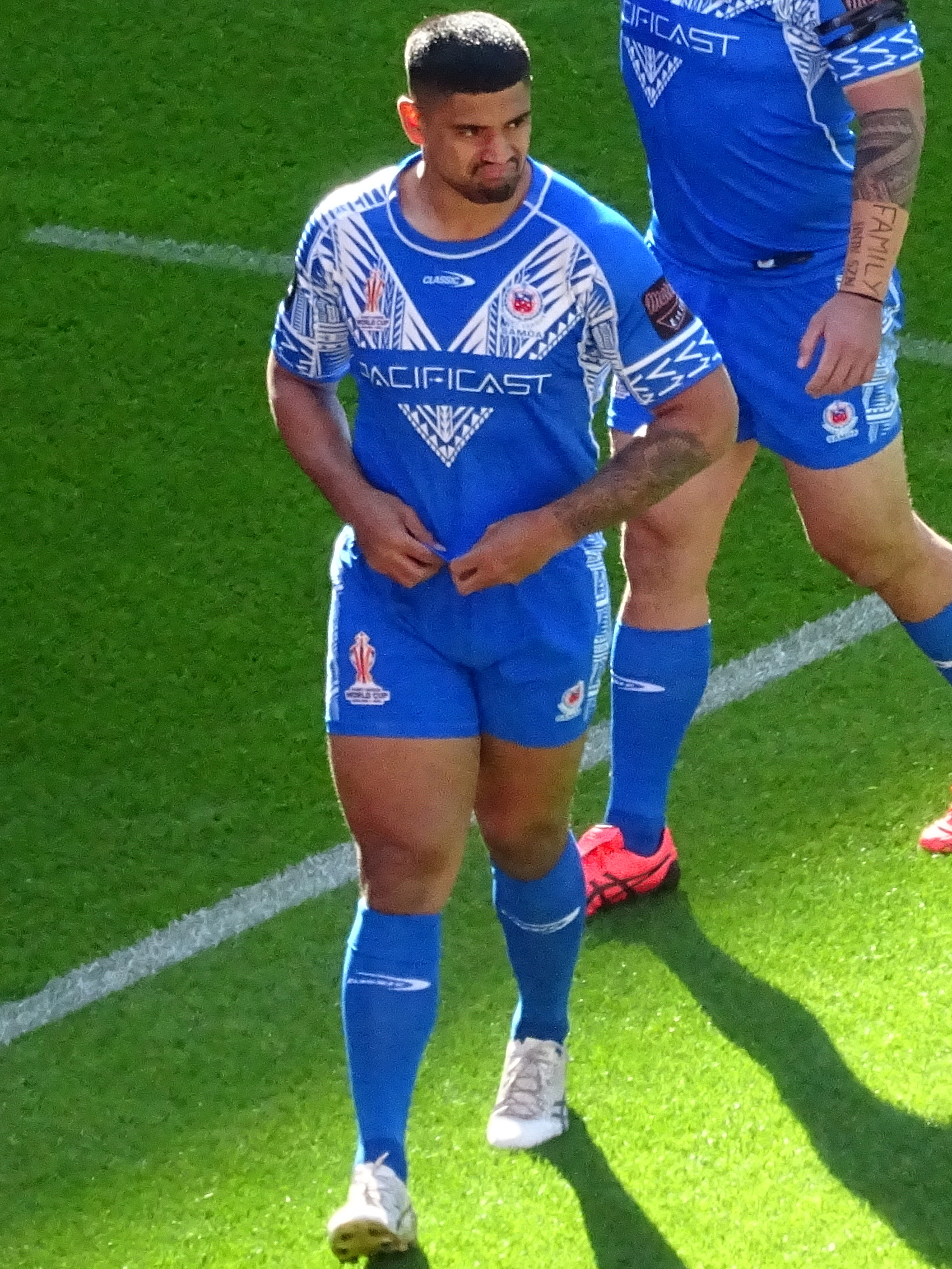

Personal information
- Full name: Oregon Kaufusi
- Born: 20 August 1999 (age 27) Auckland, New Zealand
- Height: 188 cm (6 ft 2 in)
- Weight: 114 kg (17 st 13 lb)

Playing information
- Position: Prop, Lock
Club
Years	Team	Pld	T	G	FG	P
2018–22	Parramatta Eels	71	3	0	0	12
2023–	Cronulla Sharks	88	4	0	0	16
	Total	159	7	0	0	28
Representative
Years	Team	Pld	T	G	FG	P
2022	Samoa	5	0	0	0	0
- Source: As of 12 September 2026

Oregon Kaufusi (born 20 August 1999) is a Samoa international rugby league footballer who plays as a prop for the Cronulla-Sutherland Sharks in the National Rugby League.

He previously played for the Parramatta Eels in the NRL.

== Background ==
Kaufusi was born in Auckland, New Zealand. And is of Tongan and Samoan descent.

== Early career ==
Kaufusi went to Hills Sports High School and developed as a Parramatta junior, playing Harold Matthews and SG ball for the Eels. He represented NSW 16's, 18's and 20's, also Australian schoolboys.

== Playing career ==
=== 2018 ===
In 2018, Kaufusi started the season in Jersey Flegg, before being promoted to Intrust Super Premiership playing for the Wentworthville Magpies. He played 12 games and scoring 2 tries. On August 17, round 23 of the 2018 NRL season Kaufusi made his NRL debut for the Eels against the Melbourne Storm in a 20–4 loss. Kaufusi appeared in the Round 25 clash against the Sydney Roosters, playing 45 minutes making over 100 metres running. He completed 2018 with 2 NRL appearances.

=== 2019 ===
On 22 April 2019, Kaufusi scored his first try in the NRL during the first game played at the new Western Sydney Stadium as Parramatta defeated Wests Tigers 51–6. Kaufusi re-signed with Parramatta until the end of 2022.

Kaufusi made a total of eight appearances for Parramatta in the 2019 NRL season. Kaufusi played for the club's feeder side the Wentworthville Magpies in their Canterbury Cup NSW grand final defeat against Newtown at Bankwest Stadium.

=== 2020 ===
Kaufusi played 13 games for Parramatta in the 2020 NRL season as the club finished third on the table. He did not feature in Parramatta's finals campaign which once again ended in the second week of the finals.

=== 2021 ===
Kaufusi played 21 games for Parramatta in the 2021 NRL season. Kaufusi did not play for Parramatta in either of their two finals matches against Newcastle or Penrith. On 22 December, Kaufusi signed a two-year deal worth $400,000 a season with Cronulla starting in 2023.

=== 2022 ===
Kaufusi played 28 games for Parramatta in the 2022 NRL season including the clubs Grand Final loss to Penrith.

In October, Kaufusi was named in the Samoa squad for the 2021 Rugby League World Cup.

=== 2023 ===
Kaufusi played a total of 19 games for Cronulla in the 2023 NRL season as Cronulla finished sixth on the table. Kaufusi played in the clubs 13-12 upset loss against the Sydney Roosters which ended their season.

=== 2024 ===
Kaufusi played 26 games for Cronulla in the 2024 NRL season as the club finished 4th on the table and qualified for the finals. On 6 November, it was announced that Kaufusi re-signed a one-year extension with the Sharks.

=== 2025 ===
Kaufusi extended his contract with Cronulla until the end of 2027. He played 22 matches for Cronulla in the 2025 NRL season as the club finished 5th on the table. The club reached the preliminary final for a second consecutive season but lost against Melbourne 22-14.

=== 2026 ===
Kaufusi played 22 matches for Cronulla in the 2026 NRL season as the club finished 5th on the table and qualified for the finals.

== Statistics ==
Year	Team	Games	Tries	Pts
2018	Parramatta Eels	2		
2019	Parramatta Eels	8	1	4
2020	Parramatta Eels	13		
2021	Parramatta Eels	21	1	4
2022	Parramatta Eels	27	1	4
2023	Cronulla-Sutherland Sharks	19		
2024	Cronulla-Sutherland Sharks	26	2	8
2025	Cronulla-Sutherland Sharks	22	1	4
2026*	Cronulla-Sutherland Sharks	12	1	4
	Totals	150	7	28

*denotes season competing
