= 2022 NRL Grand Final =

NRL Grand Final

- Official logo for the match.

| Penrith Panthers | Parramatta Eels |
|---|---|
| 28 | 12 |
| | 1 | 2 | Total |
|---|---|---|---|
| PEN | 18 | 10 | 28 |
| PAR | 0 | 12 | 12 |
- Date: 2 October 2022
- Stadium: Accor Stadium
- Location: Sydney, New South Wales, Australia
- Clive Churchill Medal: Dylan Edwards
- Advance Australia Fair: Alinta Chidzey
- Pre Match Entertainment: Jimmy Barnes, Mahalia Barnes, Johnny Diesel, Midlife Crisis Josh Teskey, Emma Donovan, Bliss n Eso, Sheldon Riley
- Referees: Ashley Klein, Phil Henderson (Touch Judge); Drew Oultram (Touch Judge)
- Attendance: 82,415

Broadcast partners
- Broadcasters: Nine Network
- Commentators: Mathew Thompson; Cameron Smith; Andrew Johns; Brad Fittler; Danika Mason

The 2022 NRL Grand Final was the conclusive and premiership-deciding game of the 2022 National Rugby League season in Australia. It was contested between the Penrith Panthers and the Parramatta Eels on Sunday the 2nd of October at Accor Stadium in Sydney. Penrith, who were both the defending premiers and minor premiers, won the match 28–12 to claim their fourth premiership title, and their first back-to-back premierships in the club's 56-year history. Panthers fullback Dylan Edwards was awarded the Clive Churchill Medal for being judged as the man of the match.

The match was preceded by the 2022 NRL State Championship and the 2022 NRL Women's Grand Final. The grand final was attended by 82,415 spectators, and was broadcast live throughout Australia by the Nine Network.

== Background ==
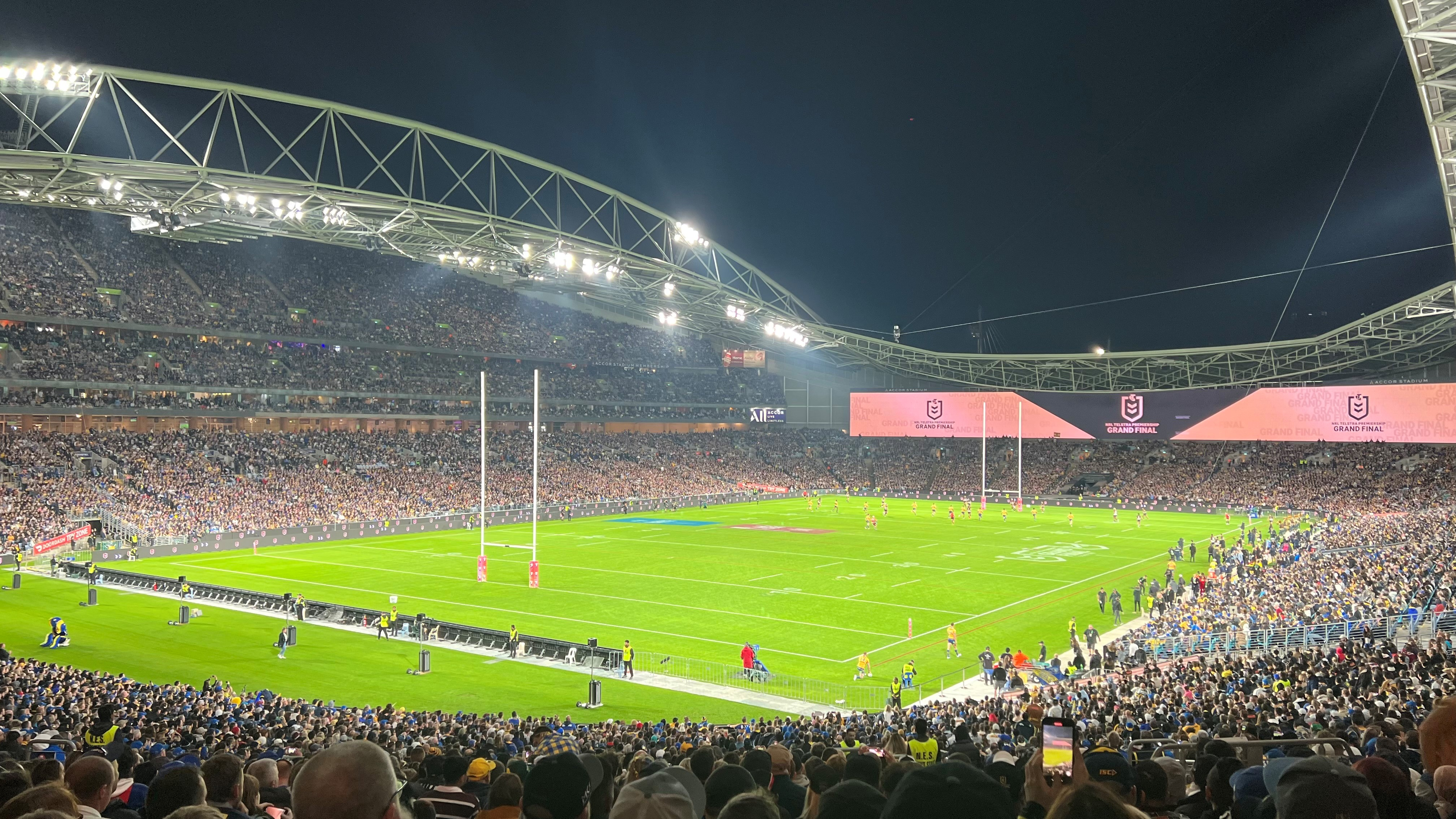
Accor Stadium, where the match was played

This was the first NRL grand final between the Penrith Panthers and the Parramatta Eels, and the second consecutive year that the grand final featured two Sydney-based clubs. The match-up between both clubs has long been regarded as the Western Sydney Derby, due to the long standing rivalry between the two clubs being closely located among Western Sydney. The Panthers, who became the first side since the Melbourne Storm in 2018 to reach three consecutive grand finals, were aiming for a fourth premiership, after defeating Canberra Raiders in 1991, Sydney Roosters in 2003 and South Sydney Rabbitohs in 2021. It was Ivan Cleary's fourth grand final appearance as a coach, after previously losing with the New Zealand Warriors against Manly Sea Eagles in 2011, and losing with Penrith against Melbourne Storm in 2020.

Meanwhile, the Eels were aiming for their fifth premiership victory; their most recent being against Canterbury-Bankstown Bulldogs in 1986. Their last grand final appearance was a defeat to the Melbourne Storm in 2009. It was Brad Arthur's first grand final appearance as a coach.

The Panthers finished the 2022 regular season in first place after twenty wins and four losses, of which two were against the Eels. Parramatta finished fourth after sixteen wins and eight losses.

== Route to the final ==
=== Penrith Panthers ===
The 2022 Penrith Panthers season was the 56th season in the club's history. Coached by Ivan Cleary and co-captained by Nathan Cleary and Isaah Yeo, the Panthers are competing in the National Rugby League's 2022 Telstra Premiership.

Penrith Panthers' route to the final
| Round | Opposition | Score |
|---|---|---|
| QF | Parramatta Eels (H) | 27–8 |
| SF | Bye | |
| PF | South Sydney Rabbitohs (H) | 32–12 |
Key: (H) = Home venue; (A) = Away venue; (N) = Neutral venue

=== Parramatta Eels ===
The 2022 Parramatta Eels season was the 76th in the club's history. Coached by Brad Arthur and co-captained by Clinton Gutherson and Junior Paulo, they will compete in the NRL's 2022 Telstra Premiership. The season saw a club record membership tally of 34,264.

Parramatta Eels' route to the final
| Round | Opposition | Score |
|---|---|---|
| QF | Penrith Panthers (A) | 8–27 |
| SF | Canberra Raiders (H) | 40–4 |
| PF | North Queensland Cowboys (A) | 24–20 |
Key: (H) = Home venue; (A) = Away venue; (N) = Neutral venue

== Pre-match ==
=== Team selection ===
Dylan Edwards, Stephen Crichton, Brian To'o, Jarome Luai, Nathan Cleary, Apisai Koroisau, James Fisher-Harris, Viliame Kikau, Liam Martin, Moses Leota and Isaah Yeo made their third-straight grand final appearance for Penrith, whilst Koroisau also played in the 2014 premiership decider for the South Sydney Rabbitohs. Ryan Matterson and Bailey Simonsson were the only players for Parramatta to have played in prior grand finals; Matterson won for the Sydney Roosters in 2018, while Simonsson played for the Canberra Raiders in 2019.

=== Broadcasting ===
The match was broadcast live on the Nine Network and delayed on Fox League in Australia as well as on Sky Sport in New Zealand. Radio broadcasters included ABC, Triple M, 2GB, SEN and Koori Radio.

=== Entertainment ===
On 23 September 2022, the pre-match entertainment acts for the grand final were announced. This included Jimmy Barnes, Mahalia Barnes, A.Girl, Diesel, Josh Teskey, Emma Donovan, Sheldon Riley and Bliss n Eso. The Australian national anthem was performed by Alinta Chidzey.

=== Officiating ===
Ashley Klein refereed the match, his second NRL grand final. Grant Atkins was the senior review official, and Phil Henderson and Drew Oultram were the touch judges. Gerard Sutton was the standby referee and David Munro the standby touch judge.

=== Attendance ===
The 2022 Grand Final was the first since the beginning of the COVID-19 pandemic to have no crowd restrictions. On 27 September 2022, the match was sold out.

=== Curtain-raiser matches ===
Curtain-raiser matches on the day were the NRL State Championship between the Norths Devils and the Penrith Panthers, and NRLW Grand Final between the Newcastle Knights and the Parramatta Eels. Both were shown live on the Nine Network in Australia.

== Match ==
2022 NRL Grand Final

Sunday, 2 October
19:35 AEDT (UTC+11)

| Penrith Panthers | 28 – 12 | Parramatta Eels |
|---|---|---|
| Tries: 5 To'o 18', 46'; Crichton 11'; Sorensen 28'; Staines 59'; Goals: 4 Cleary 13', pen 22', 29', 61' (4/6) | 1st: 18–0; 2nd: 10–12; Report | Tries: 2 Gutherson 77'; Arthur 78'; Goals: 2 Moses 77', 79' (2/2) |

Accor Stadium, Sydney
Attendance: 82,415
Referee: Ashley Klein
Bunker: Grant Atkins
Touch judges: Phil Henderson, Drew Oultram
Clive Churchill Medal: Dylan Edwards (Penrith)

Penrith Panthers
| FB | 1 | Dylan Edwards |
| WG | 2 | Charlie Staines |
| CE | 3 | Izack Tago |
| CE | 4 | Stephen Crichton |
| WG | 5 | Brian To'o |
| FE | 6 | Jarome Luai |
| HB | 7 | Nathan Cleary |
| PR | 8 | Moses Leota |
| HK | 14 | Mitch Kenny |
| PR | 10 | James Fisher-Harris |
| SR | 11 | Viliame Kikau |
| SR | 12 | Liam Martin |
| LF | 13 | Isaah Yeo |
Interchange:
| IN | 9 | Apisai Koroisau |
| IN | 15 | Scott Sorensen |
| IN | 16 | Spencer Leniu |
| IN | 17 | Jaeman Salmon |
| CS | 18 | Sean O'Sullivan |
Coach:
Ivan Cleary

Parramatta Eels
| FB | 1 | Clinton Gutherson |
| WG | 2 | Maika Sivo |
| CE | 3 | Will Penisini |
| CE | 4 | Bailey Simonsson |
| WG | 5 | Waqa Blake |
| FE | 6 | Dylan Brown |
| HB | 7 | Mitchell Moses |
| PR | 8 | Reagan Campbell-Gillard |
| HK | 9 | Reed Mahoney |
| PR | 10 | Junior Paulo |
| SR | 11 | Shaun Lane |
| SR | 12 | Isaiah Papali'i |
| LF | 17 | Marata Niukore |
Interchange:
| IN | 13 | Ryan Matterson |
| IN | 14 | Nathan Brown |
| IN | 15 | Jake Arthur |
| IN | 16 | Oregon Kaufusi |
| CS | 18 | Bryce Cartwright |
Coach:
Brad Arthur

=== Statistics ===
| Statistic | Penrith Panthers | Parramatta Eels |
|---|---|---|
| Tries | 5 | 2 |
| Conversions | 3 | 2 |
| Penalty goals (attempts) | 1 (1) | 0 (0) |
| Field goals (attempts) | 0 (0) | 0 (0) |
Possession
| Possession | 55% | 45% |
| Total sets | 44 | 36 |
| Completed sets | 38 | 25 |
| Completion rate | 86% | 69% |
Attacking
| All runs | 212 | 200 |
| All run metres | 2109 | 1581 |
| Line breaks | 7 | 3 |
| Offloads | 6 | 19 |
Defending
| Kick metres | 674 | 736 |
| 40/20 | 0 | 0 |
| Tackles | 154 | 227 |
| Missed tackles | 6 | 26 |
| Goal line dropouts | 0 | 3 |
| Try saves | 0 | 0 |
Discipline
| Penalties conceded | 5 | 5 |
| Errors | 7 | 12 |
| Send offs | 0 | 0 |
| Sin bins | 0 | 0 |
Reference: NRL Match Centre

Penrith Panthers:

- Most runs: 28 – Dylan Edwards
- Most running metres: 299 – Brian To'o
- Most line breaks: 3 – Brian To'o
- Most tackles: 45 – Liam Martin
- Most missed tackles: 5 – Liam Martin
- Most errors: 3 – Stephen Crichton

Parramatta Eels:

- Most runs: 20 –
  - Clinton Gutherson
  - Dylan Brown
  - Ryan Matterson
- Most running metres: 167 – Clinton Gutherson
- Most line breaks: 1 –
  - Clinton Gutherson
  - Maika Sivo
  - Dylan Brown
- Most tackles: 56 – Reed Mahoney
- Most missed tackles: 11 – Isaiah Papali'i
- Most errors: 3 –
  - Clinton Gutherson
  - Waqa Blake

== Post-match ==
Parramatta forward Ryan Matterson was charged by the match review with a grade one crusher tackle against Dylan Edwards. Matterson was criticised after taking an early guilty plea and electing to be suspended for three matches instead of taking a $4,000 fine. Matterson defended his decision telling reporters "I just feel that $4000 is pretty hefty considering I have already paid close to $4000 in fines this year for things that are absurd", with the forward also suggesting that the charge was not warranted.

Penrith players were criticised for their celebrations after their victory, with Sydney media identities outspoken against the way they celebrated. Jarome Luai came under scrutiny for a social media post that some found offensive. Former Penrith captain Greg Alexander and coach Ivan Cleary defended the players against the criticism.

Both grand final teams' players featured in squads selected for the 2021 Rugby League World Cup to be played in October–November 2022. Ten Panthers players were selected with the greatest representation (5) to play for Samoa. Parramatta had also had ten players selected, with the greatest representation (3) to play for New Zealand.

As premiership winners, Penrith earned the right to play in the World Club Challenge against 2022 Super League Grand Final winners St Helens. The match was played on 18 February 2023 at BlueBet Stadium.

== Opening Matches ==
Two opening matches were played on the ground prior to the grand final: the NRL State Championship and NRL Women's Grand Final. Both matches were broadcast live throughout Australia by the Nine Network.

=== NRL State Championship ===
Sunday, 2 October
1:35pm (AEDT)

Penrith Panthers
Tries:
J'maine Hopgood 7', 71'

Soni Luke 28'
Eddie Blacker 32'
John Faiumu 45'
Robert Jennings 47'
Luke Sommerton 62'
Sunia Turuva 79'

Goals:
Kurt Falls 9', 29', 34', 63', 72'
(5/7) John Faiumu 80' (1/1)

44 – 10
1st: 18 – 0
2nd: 26 – 10
scorecard

Norths Devils
Tries:

Tony Tumusa 64'
Rashaun Denny 73'

Goals:
Connor Broadhurst 75' (1/2)

Accor Stadium, Sydney
Attendance: 11,115

=== NRL Women's Premiership Grand Final ===
Sunday, 2 October
4:05pm (AEDT)

Newcastle Knights Women's
Tries:

Kiana Takairangi 17', 63'
Emmanita Paki 20'
Romy Teitzel 27'
Tamika Upton 38'
Kiana Takairangi 63'
Jesse Southwell 67'
Yasmin Clydsdale 69'

Goals:
Kirra Dibb 28'
Jesse Southwell 68'

32 – 12
1st: 14 – 6
2nd: 18 – 6
scorecard

Parramatta Eels Women's
Tries:

Brooke Anderson 12'
Simaima Taufa 50'

Goals:
1/1 Tayla Preston 13', 51'

Accor Stadium, Sydney
Attendance: 42,921
Referee: Kasey Badger
