= 2024 Parramatta Eels season =

78th Parramatta Eels season

- NRL Rank: 15th
- Play-off result: Did not qualify
- 2024 record: Wins: 7; losses: 17
- Points scored: For: 561; against: 716

Team information
- CEO: Jim Sarantinos
- Coach: (Australia) Brad Arthur (until 20 May) (Australia) Trent Barrett (from 20 May)
- Captain: (Australia) Clinton Gutherson (Samoa) Junior Paulo
- Stadium: CommBank Stadium (Capacity: 30,000)
- Avg. attendance: 18,192
- Agg. attendance: 218,298
- High attendance: 29,171 (9 March vs Canterbury-Bankstown Bulldogs, Round 1)

Top scorers
- Tries: (Fiji) Maika Sivo (17)
- Goals: (Australia) Clinton Gutherson (38)
- Points: (Australia) Clinton Gutherson (112)
← 2023	List of seasons	2025 →

The 2024 Parramatta Eels season was the 78th season in the club's history and the 27th in the National Rugby League. Coached by Brad Arthur for his eleventh consecutive season, and co-captained by Clinton Gutherson and Junior Paulo, the team competed in the 2024 NRL Telstra Premiership during the regular season and also participated in the Pre-season Challenge in February during their pre-season fixtures.

On 20 May, Arthur was sacked by the board after winning only one out of the previous seven games, assistant Trent Barrett took over as interim coach for the remainder of the season.

== Summary ==
=== Pre-season ===
After losing several key players the previous season from their Grand Final defeat in 2022, Parramatta had a very quiet off-season in the lead up to 2024. Josh Hodgson and Andrew Davey retired at the conclusion of the 2023 season, and Jack Murchie made a move to the English club Huddersfield Giants. Waqa Blake and Samuel Loizou both did not receive contract extensions and were moved to St Helens and Wests Tigers (train-and-trial contract) respectively.

The Eels signed Manly Warringah Sea Eagles duo Kelma Tuilagi and Morgan Harper for the 2024 season. Uinitoni Mataele and Tevita Taumoepenu both received top 30 contracts, while Jock Brazel, Charlie Guymer, Luca Moretti, Ethan Sanders and Sam Tuivaiti made up the development-listed players. J'maine Hopgood was the only Parramatta player to receive a call-up to the 2024 All Stars match.

Parramatta lost 16–38 in their opening match of the pre-season against the Canberra Raiders. The Eels were captained by Shaun Lane and fielded a very youthful team, only featuring a number of first-grade players. They led the match 16–10 early in the second half before the Raiders scored 28 unanswered points to take out the match.

In their second and final pre-season match against the Gold Coast Titans in Ipswich, the Eels were welcomed with the return of an almost full-strength team and leaving victors 16–26. Parramatta led the match 8–26 mid-way through the second half, before resting several starting players in preparation for the home and away season, which started in a fortnight. With the result, the Eels finished 8th in the Pre-Season Challenge on 15 points. The match also saw Eels winger, Maika Sivo receive a 3-match ban for a high tackle on Titans five-eighth Alexander Brimson.

=== Regular season ===
Parramatta opened the season with a 26–8 victory over the Canterbury-Bankstown Bulldogs in front of a record regular season crowd of 29,171 at CommBank Stadium. The Eels faced reigning premiers and arch rivals, Penrith Panthers at BlueBet Stadium in the second round of the season. Parramatta lost winger Bailey Simonsson in the opening minutes of the match, leaving forward Kelma Tuilagi have to cover the left-side edge for the remainder of the match. Despite the injury, Parramatta led the Panthers 16–18 at half time, but ultimately fell short in the second half, defeated 26–18.

In March 2024, Jirah Momoisea and Ky Rodwell were both released from their contracts.

On 20 May 2024, Arthur was sacked by the board after winning only one out of the previous seven games, assistant Trent Barrett took over as interim coach for the remainder of the season.

On 8 July 2024, the club announced that Jason Ryles would be appointed as the new head coach of the side on a four-year deal starting in 2025.

The club would manage to avoid the wooden spoon in the final game of the regular season after defeating the Wests Tigers 60–26 in the "spoon bowl" game. Due to other results going their way, Parramatta would finish 15th on the table.

=== Post-season ===
On 10 September 2024, Reagan Campbell-Gillard won the Ken Thornett Medal.

Mitchell Moses (Australia), Maika Sivo (Fiji) and Makahesi Makatoa (Cook Islands) all received call-ups for their respective nations for the 2024 Pacific Championships. Jake Tago and Blaize Talagi were also selected to represent Samoa in their tour of England.

== Squad information ==
=== Playing squad ===
The NRL playing squad of the Parramatta Eels for the 2024 NRL season as of 9 March 2024.

Cap	Player	Nat.	Position(s)	Date of birth (age)	Signed	Signed from	Contract until
Top 30 squad
749	Junior Paulo (c)	(Samoa)	Prop	20 November 1993 (aged 30)	2019	Canberra Raiders	2026
776	Clinton Gutherson (c)	(Australia)	Fullback, Five-eighth, Wing, Centre	9 September 1994 (aged 29)	2016	Manly Warringah Sea Eagles	2025
788	Mitchell Moses	(Australia)	Halfback, Five-eighth	16 September 1994 (aged 29)	2017	Wests Tigers	2028
798	Maika Sivo	(Fiji)	Wing	3 October 1993 (aged 30)	2019	Penrith Panthers	2027
800	Dylan Brown	(New Zealand)	Five-eighth	21 June 2000 (aged 23)	2019	Youth	2031
801	Shaun Lane	(Australia)	Second-row, Prop	29 November 1994 (aged 29)	2019	Manly Warringah Sea Eagles	2026
804	Reagan Campbell-Gillard	(Australia)	Prop	27 July 1993 (aged 30)	2020	Penrith Panthers	2025
805	Ryan Matterson	(Australia)	Second-row, Lock, Five-eighth	13 October 1994 (aged 29)	2020	Wests Tigers	2026
809	Haze Dunster	(New Zealand)	Wing	1 March 1999 (aged 25)	2020	Youth	2025
813	Bryce Cartwright	(Australia)	Second-row, Lock, Five-eighth	15 November 1994 (aged 29)	2021	Gold Coast Titans	2025
814	Wiremu Greig	(New Zealand)	Prop	12 November 1999 (aged 24)	2021	North Queensland Cowboys	2025
816	Joey Lussick	(Australia)	Hooker	28 December 1995 (aged 28)	2023	St Helens	2025
817	Sean Russell	(Australia)	Wing, Centre, Fullback	27 May 2002 (aged 21)	2021	Youth	2025
819	Will Penisini	(Tonga)	Centre	31 July 2002 (aged 21)	2021	Youth	2026
821	Makahesi Makatoa	(Cook Islands)	Prop, Lock	30 January 1993 (aged 31)	2021	Featherstone Rovers	2024
825	Bailey Simonsson	(New Zealand)	Wing, Centre, Fullback	18 February 1998 (aged 26)	2022	Canberra Raiders	2024
827	Ofahiki Ogden	(New Zealand)	Prop	6 June 1996 (aged 27)	2022	Canterbury-Bankstown Bulldogs	2024
829	Matt Doorey	(Australia)	Second-row	27 June 2000 (aged 23)	2023	Canterbury-Bankstown Bulldogs	2025
830	J'maine Hopgood	(Australia)	Lock	11 May 1999 (aged 24)	2023	Penrith Panthers	2025
834	Brendan Hands	(Australia)	Hooker	2 December 1999 (aged 24)	2023	Youth	2025
835	Joe Ofahengaue	(Tonga)	Lock, Prop	15 September 1995 (aged 28)	2023	Wests Tigers	2025
837	Daejarn Asi	(Samoa)	Five-eighth, Centre, Halfback	15 August 2000 (aged 23)	2023	New Zealand Warriors	2024
842	Morgan Harper	(New Zealand)	Centre	28 August 1998 (aged 25)	2024	Manly Warringah Sea Eagles	2024
843	Kelma Tuilagi	(Samoa)	Second-row	16 February 1999 (aged 25)	2024	Manly Warringah Sea Eagles	2025
844	Blaize Talagi	(Samoa)	Five-eighth, Fullback	16 March 2005 (aged 18)	2024	Youth	2025
–	Zac Cini	(Australia)	Centre, Wing, Fullback	24 May 2000 (aged 23)	2022	Wests Tigers	2024
–	Uinitoni Mataele	(Australia)	Second-row	N/A	2023	Youth	2025
Development list
836	Luca Moretti	(Italy)	Lock, Prop	19 April 2000 (aged 23)	2023	Youth	2025
845	Ethan Sanders	(Australia)	Halfback, Five-eighth	N/A	2024	Youth	2024
848	Charlie Guymer	(Australia)	Second-row	N/A	2024	Youth	2024
–	Jock Brazel	(Australia)	Second-row	N/A	2024	Youth	2024
–	Sam Tuivaiti	(Australia)	Prop	N/A	2024	Youth	2025
Extended squad
833	Isaac Lumelume	(Fiji)	Wing, Centre	16 April 1998 (aged 25)	2023	Canterbury-Bankstown Bulldogs	
838	Arthur Miller-Stephen	(Australia)	Wing, Fullback	N/A	2022	Youth	
846	Matt Arthur	(Australia)	Hooker	4 February 2005 (aged 19)	2024	Youth	
847	Jake Tago	(Samoa)	Wing, Centre	10 February 1999 (aged 25)	2024	North Sydney Bears	
849	Lorenzo Mulitalo	(New Zealand)	Wing	17 November 1999 (aged 24)	2024	Cronulla-Sutherland Sharks	
850	Dan Keir	(Australia)	Lock, Second-row	12 March 1998 (aged 25)	2021	Canberra Raiders	
Player(s) who left the club during the season
824	Ky Rodwell	(Australia)	Second-row, Lock, Five-eighth	21 June 1999 (aged 24)	2021	Western Suburbs Magpies	2024
831	Jirah Momoisea	(New Zealand)	Prop, Second-row	2 September 1998 (aged 25)	2023	Newcastle Knights	2024
–	Tevita Taumoepenu	(Australia)	Lock	N/A	2024	Youth	2024

=== Coaching staff ===
The coaching staff of the Parramatta Eels for the 2024 NRL season as of 8 February 2024.

Position	Name
General Manager of Football	Mark O’Neill
NRL head coach	Brad Arthur (until 20 May); Trent Barrett (from 20 May)
Assistant coaches	Trent Barrett (until 20 May); Steve Antonelli; Steve Murphy
NSW Cup head coach	Nathan Cayless
Jersey Flegg Cup head coach	Craig Brennan

== Squad changes ==
=== Transfers in ===
Date	Pos.	Player	From	Window	Ref.
October 2023	SR	(Samoa) Kelma Tuilagi	Manly Warringah Sea Eagles	Pre-season	
October 2023	CE	(New Zealand) Morgan Harper	Manly Warringah Sea Eagles	Pre-season	

=== Transfers out ===
Date	Pos.	Player	To	Window	Ref.
August 2023	SR	(Australia) Jack Murchie	Huddersfield Giants	Pre-season	
September 2023	HK	(England) Josh Hodgson	Retirement	Pre-season	
October 2023	SR	(Australia) Andrew Davey	Retirement	Pre-season	
October 2023	CE	(Fiji) Waqa Blake	St Helens	Pre-season	
October 2023	CE	(Australia) Samuel Loizou	Wests Tigers	Pre-season	
March 2024	PR	(New Zealand) Jirah Momoisea	Canterbury-Bankstown Bulldogs	Mid-season	
March 2024	SR	(Australia) Ky Rodwell	Wakefield Trinity	Mid-season	
May 2024	LK	(Australia) Tevita Taumoepenu	South Sydney Rabbitohs	Mid-season	

== Pre-season ==
Parramatta played the Canberra Raiders in Kogarah and the Gold Coast Titans in Ipswich as their pre-season fixtures. Both matches were part of the second edition of the NRL Pre-season Challenge.

Win Draw Loss

Round 1: 17 February 2024	Parramatta Eels	16–38	Canberra Raiders	Kogarah
17:55 AEDT	Tries: Ogden 7'; Russell 11'; Simonsson 44'; Goals: Russell 2/3 8', 44'	[Report Report]	Tries: Weekes 17'; Taateo 27'; Stuart 51'; Schiller 56'; Hola 60'; Cook 67'; N. Martin 72'; Goals: Strange 4/5 29', 53', 57', 60'; Cook 1/2 68'; Sin bin: N. Martin (yellow card) 41' to 51'	Stadium: Netstrata Jubilee Stadium; Attendance: 8,827; Referee: Nick Pelgrave

Round 2: 25 February 2024	Gold Coast Titans	16–26	Parramatta Eels	Ipswich
16:00 AEST	Tries: Sami 10'; Brimson 43'; Khan-Pereira 56'; S. Fifita 68'; Goals: Boyd 0/3; Weaver 0/1	[Report Report]	Tries: Penisini 2'; Sivo 15'; Campbell-Gillard 21'; Cartwright 33'; Hopgood 46'; Goals: Moses 3/5 17', 23', 48'	Stadium: North Ipswich Reserve; Attendance: 5,306; Referee: Gerard Sutton

== Regular season ==
=== Ladder ===
Pos	Team	Pld	W	D	L	B	PF	PA	PD	Pts	Qualification
1	Melbourne Storm	24	19	0	5	3	692	449	+243	44	Advance to finals series
2	Penrith Panthers (P)	24	17	0	7	3	580	394	+186	40	Advance to finals series
3	Sydney Roosters	24	16	0	8	3	738	463	+275	38	Advance to finals series
4	Cronulla-Sutherland Sharks	24	16	0	8	3	653	431	+222	38	Advance to finals series
5	North Queensland Cowboys	24	15	0	9	3	657	568	+89	36	Advance to finals series
6	Canterbury-Bankstown Bulldogs	24	14	0	10	3	529	433	+96	34	Advance to finals series
7	Manly Warringah Sea Eagles	24	13	1	10	3	634	521	+113	33	Advance to finals series
8	Newcastle Knights	24	12	0	12	3	470	510	−40	30	Advance to finals series
9	Canberra Raiders	24	12	0	12	3	474	601	−127	30	
10	Dolphins	24	11	0	13	3	577	578	−1	28	
11	St. George Illawarra Dragons	24	11	0	13	3	508	634	−126	28	
12	Brisbane Broncos	24	10	0	14	3	537	607	−70	26	
13	New Zealand Warriors	24	9	1	14	3	512	574	−62	25	
14	Gold Coast Titans	24	8	0	16	3	488	656	−168	22	
15	Parramatta Eels	24	7	0	17	3	561	716	−155	20	
16	South Sydney Rabbitohs	24	7	0	17	3	494	682	−188	20	
17	Wests Tigers	24	6	0	18	3	463	750	−287	18	

Source: National Rugby League
(P) Premiers

=== Results by round ===
Round	1	2	3	4	5	6	7	8	9	10	11	12	13	14	15	16	17	18	19	20	21	22	23	24	25	26	27
Ground	H	A	H	H	A	H	H	A	–	H	N	A	H	A	H	–	A	H	A	–	H	A	H	A	A	H	A
Result	W	L	W	L	L	W	L	L	B	L	L	L	W	L	L	B	L	L	L	B	L	W	L	L	L	W	W
Position	3	7	6	9	14	11	14	14	12	13	14	15	15	14	15	17	16	16	16	16	16	16	16	16	16	16	15
Points	2	2	4	4	4	6	6	6	8	8	8	8	10	10	10	12	12	12	12	14	14	16	16	16	16	18	20

Source: National Rugby League
A = Away; H = Home; N = Neutral; B = Bye; W = Win; D = Draw; L = Loss

=== Matches ===
The league fixtures were announced on 13 November 2023.

Win Draw Loss Fixtures

Round 1: 9 March 2024	Parramatta Eels	26–8	Canterbury-Bankstown Bulldogs	Parramatta
17:30 AEDT	Tries: Harper 12'; Cartwright 36', 50'; Simonsson 76'; Goals: Moses 1/1 13'; Gutherson 4/4 26 pen', 37', 51', 77'	[Report Report]	Tries: Wilson 65'; Crichton 69'; Goals: Burton 0/2	Stadium: CommBank Stadium; Attendance: 29,171; Referee: Grant Atkins

Round 2: 15 March 2024	Penrith Panthers	26–18	Parramatta Eels	Penrith
20:05 AEDT	Tries: Edwards 10'; Leota 15'; Turuva 27', 52'; Tago 54'; Goals: Cleary 3/5 11', 17', 53'	[Report Report]	Tries: Lussick 2'; Lane 21'; Hopgood 38'; Goals: Moses 1/1 3'; Gutherson 2/2 23', 39'	Stadium: BlueBet Stadium; Attendance: 21,522; Referee: Ashley Klein

Round 3: 24 March 2024	Parramatta Eels	28–24	Manly Warringah Sea Eagles	Parramatta
16:05 AEDT	Tries: Penisini 18'; Moses 25'; Talagi 32'; Harper 42'; Tuilagi 58'; Goals: Gutherson 3/5 19', 26', 59'; Moses 1/1 66 pen'	[Report Report]	Tries: T. Trbojevic 5'; Paulo 11'; Garrick 39'; Waddell 72'; Goals: Garrick 4/5 4 pen', 7', 12', 73'; Sin bin: Aloiai (yellow card) 79' to 80'	Stadium: CommBank Stadium; Attendance: 20,354; Referee: Peter Gough

Round 4: 1 April 2024	Parramatta Eels	16–17	Wests Tigers	Parramatta
16:00 AEDT	Tries: Sivo 15'; Gutherson 44'; Goals: Russell 0/1; Gutherson 4/5 39 pen', 46', 49 pen', 74 pen'	[Report Report]	Tries: Olam 3', 63'; Bula 68'; Goals: Koroisau 2/3 5', 69'; Field goals: Sezer 79'; Sin bin: Galvin (yellow card) 48' to 58'	Stadium: CommBank Stadium; Attendance: 28,608; Referee: Liam Kennedy

Round 5: 7 April 2024	Canberra Raiders	41–8	Parramatta Eels	Canberra
18:15 AEST	Tries: Kris 13'; Savage 28'; Timoko 42', 78'; Levi 52'; Schiller 57'; Young 60'; Goals: Fogarty 6/9 9 pen', 15', 53', 61', 68 pen', 79'; Field goals: Fogarty 39'	[Report Report]	Tries: Sivo 47', 71'; Goals: Gutherson 0/2	Stadium: GIO Stadium; Attendance: 13,907; Referee: Adam Gee

Round 6: 13 April 2024	Parramatta Eels	27–20	North Queensland Cowboys	Parramatta
17:30 AEST	Tries: Ofahengaue 9'; Lussick 26'; Harper 43'; Asi 61'; Goals: Gutherson 5/6 10', 16 pen', 27', 45', 63'; Field goals: Asi 76'	[Report Report]	Tries: Nanai 4'; Chester 18'; Holmes 50'; Drinkwater 70'; Goals: Holmes 2/4 6', 71'	Stadium: CommBank Stadium; Attendance: 14,443; Referee: Peter Gough

Round 7: 19 April 2024	Parramatta Eels	16–44	Dolphins	Darwin
19:30 ACST	Tries: Lane 16'; Penisini 26'; Brown 77'; Goals: Russell 0/2; Gutherson 2/2 45 pen', 78'	[Report Report]	Tries: Bostock 30', 69', 74'; Niu 49', 71'; Fuller 51'; Plath 55', 57'; Averillo 63'; Goals: Isaako 3/7 50', 52', 56'; Nikorima 1/2 73'	Stadium: TIO Stadium; Attendance: 11,094; Referee: Todd Smith

Round 8: 26 April 2024	Manly Warringah Sea Eagles	32–18	Parramatta Eels	Brookvale
20:00 AEST	Tries: Talau 28'; T. Trbojevic 44'; Cherry-Evans 49'; Garrick 69', 74'; Goals: Garrick 6/6 29', 46', 51', 58 pen', 71', 76'; Sin bin: Olakau'atu (yellow card) 4' to 14'	[Report Report]	Tries: Sivo 17', 33', 66'; Simonsson 37'; Goals: Gutherson 1/4 4 pen' Brown 0/1; Sin bin: Penisini (yellow card) 57' to 67'; Sivo (yellow card) 69' to 79'	Stadium: 4 Pines Park; Attendance: 17,385; Referee: Gerard Sutton

Round 9 (Bye for Parramatta Eels)

Round 10: 10 May 2024	Parramatta Eels	14–30	Brisbane Broncos	Parramatta
20:00 AEST	Tries: Talagi 31'; Brown 41'; Goals: Russell 3/3 8 pen', 33', 42'	[Report Report]	Tries: Walsh 16'; Mariner 24', 38'; Mam 52'; Cobbo 56'; Goals: Walsh 4/4 17', 39', 53', 57'; Staggs 1/1 26'	Stadium: CommBank Stadium; Attendance: 17,393; Referee: Gerard Sutton

Round 11: 19 May 2024	Melbourne Storm	48–16	Parramatta Eels	Brisbane
16:05 AEST	Tries: Kamikamica 8'; Warbrick 24'; Grant 27', 48'; Smith 51', 53'; Coates 64'; Katoa 74'; Goals: Meaney 8/9 26', 28', 43 pen', 50', 53', 55', 66', 76'	[Report Report]	Tries: Simonsson 16'; Talagi 33'; Sivo 78'; Goals: Russell 0/1; Asi 2/2 34', 79'	Stadium: Suncorp Stadium; Attendance: 47,517; Referee: Wyatt Raymond

Round 12: 25 May 2024	South Sydney Rabbitohs	42–26	Parramatta Eels	Sydney Olympic Park
19:35 AEST	Tries: Arrow 8'; Koloamatangi 11', 76'; Teaupa 20'; Johnston 26'; Keppie 52'; Cook 71'; Goals: L. Mitchell 6/7 9', 12', 21', 53', 71', 77'; Teaupa 1/1 47 pen' Sin bin: L. Mitchell (yellow card) 38' to 48'	[Report Report]	Tries: Talagi 30'; Russell 32'; Harper 42'; Sivo 64', 78'; Goals: Asi 3/5 31', 34', 65'	Stadium: Accor Stadium; Attendance: 15,202; Referee: Chris Butler

Round 13: 30 May 2024	Parramatta Eels	34–22	Cronulla-Sutherland Sharks	Parramatta
20:00 AEST	Tries: Penisini 10'; Sivo 14', 23'; Paulo 47'; Simonsson 57'; Brown 68'; Goals: Moses 5/7 15', 24', 49', 54 pen', 70'	[Report Report]	Tries: Katoa 4', 65'; Kennedy 33'; Atkinson 61'; Goals: Trindall 3/4 35', 62', 66'	Stadium: CommBank Stadium; Attendance: 11,665; Referee: Ashley Klein

Round 14: 10 June 2024	Canterbury-Bankstown Bulldogs	22–18	Parramatta Eels	Sydney Olympic Park
16:00 AEST	Tries: Crichton 12', 67'; Wilson 17', 74'; Goals: Burton 3/4 19', 68', 75'; Sin bin: Mann (yellow card) 55' to 65'	[Report Report]	Tries: Talagi 6'; Penisini 33'; Tuilagi 44'; Goals: Moses 3/3 7', 34', 46'	Stadium: Accor Stadium; Attendance: 45,496; Referee: Peter Gough

Round 15: 15 June 2024	Parramatta Eels	18–28	Sydney Roosters	Parramatta
19:35 AEST	Tries: Moses 36'; Brown 41'; Talagi 45'; Goals: Moses 3/4 37', 43', 49 pen' Sin bin: Tuilagi (yellow card) 3' to 13'	[Report Report]	Tries: Pauga 4'; Jennings 9'; Tupou 27', 64'; Crichton 75'; Goals: Walker 4/5 5', 28', 66', 76'; Sin bin: Waerea-Hargreaves (yellow card) 32' to 42'	Stadium: CommBank Stadium; Attendance: 20,072; Referee: Chris Butler

Round 16 (Bye for Parramatta Eels)

Round 17: 29 June 2024	Newcastle Knights	34–26	Parramatta Eels	Newcastle
17:30 AEST	Tries: Pryce 22'; Marzhew 36', 45'; Tuala 64'; Best 72', 78'; Goals: Hastings 5/6 24', 46', 66', 74', 79'	[Report Report]	Tries: Talagi 12', 51'; Moses 25', 60'; Paulo 75'; Goals: Moses 3/5 13', 26', 75'	Stadium: McDonald Jones Stadium; Attendance: 27,424; Referee: Peter Gough

Round 18: 4 July 2024	Parramatta Eels	16–32	South Sydney Rabbitohs	Parramatta
19:50 AEST	Tries: Talagi 35'; Campbell-Gillard 50'; Cartwright 72'; Goals: Moses 2/3 51', 72'; Sin bin: Moses (yellow card) 75' to 80'	[Report Report]	Tries: Gagai 8', 68'; Wighton 32', 76'; Walker 39'; L. Mitchell 56'; Goals: L. Mitchell 4/6 33', 39', 70', 77'	Stadium: CommBank Stadium; Attendance: 13,941; Referee: Liam Kennedy

Round 19: 13 July 2024	Gold Coast Titans	24–16	Parramatta Eels	Gold Coast
17:30 AEST	Tries: Khan-Pereira 9', 12'; Sami 19'; Kelly 54'; Goals: Campbell 4/4 10', 13', 20', 55'	[Report Report]	Tries: Moretti 30'; Penisini 58'; Gutherson 65'; Goals: Asi 2/3 32', 66'	Stadium: Cbus Super Stadium; Attendance: 16,670; Referee: Todd Smith

Round 20 (Bye for Parramatta Eels)

Round 21: 26 July 2024	Parramatta Eels	14–32	Melbourne Storm	Parramatta
20:00 AEST	Tries: Tago 3'; Russell 18', 75'; Goals: Asi 0/2; Gutherson 1/1 77'; Sin bin: Tago (yellow card) 39' to 49'	[Report Report]	Tries: Anderson 12'; Grant 28'; Warbrick 46'; Wishart 58'; Papenhuyzen 68'; Goals: Meaney 6/6 13', 30', 39 pen', 47', 59', 70'	Stadium: CommBank Stadium; Attendance: 11,082; Referee: Liam Kennedy

Round 22: 2 August 2024	New Zealand Warriors	20–30	Parramatta Eels	Auckland
20:00 NZST	Tries: Tuivasa-Sheck 29'; Nicoll-Klokstad 70'; Niukore 74'; Watene-Zelezniak 79'; Goals: Johnson 1/4 71'; Harris-Tavita 1/1 79'	[Report Report]	Tries: Tago 17'; Lussick 21'; Asi 35'; Talagi 59'; Gutherson 63'; Goals: Gutherson 5/5 18', 22', 36', 61', 65'; Sin bin: Tago (yellow card) 74' to 80'	Stadium: Go Media Stadium; Attendance: 23,812; Referee: Todd Smith

Round 23: 9 August 2024	Parramatta Eels	34–36	Penrith Panthers	Parramatta
20:00 AEST	Tries: Talagi 1'; Tago 9'; Russell 35'; Penisini 46'; Gutherson 51', 68'; Goals: Gutherson 5/8 2', 11', 48', 61 pen', 69'	[Report Report]	Tries: To'o 5', 73'; Tago 15', 76'; Turuva 63', 75'; Goals: Cleary 6/7 6', 16', 26 pen', 64', 73', 77'; Sin bin: Martin (yellow card) 61' to 71'	Stadium: CommBank Stadium; Attendance: 18,852; Referee: Peter Gough

Round 24: 16 August 2024	Sydney Roosters	38–14	Parramatta Eels	Moore Park
20:00 AEST	Tries: Leniu 9'; Young 15', 44', 57'; Tupou 20'; Tedesco 26'; Tupouniua 51'; Goals: Walker 5/7 10', 16', 21', 27', 53'; Sin bin: Whyte (yellow card) 64' to 74'	[Report Report]	Tries: Tuilagi 31'; Russell 67'; Lussick 79'; Goals: Gutherson 1/3 79'; Sin bin: Greig (yellow card) 14' to 24'; Hands (yellow card) 43' to 53'	Stadium: Allianz Stadium; Attendance: 20,724; Referee: Grant Atkins

Round 25: 23 August 2024	Brisbane Broncos	30–24	Parramatta Eels	Brisbane
20:00 AEST	Tries: Sailor 31'; Rogers 34'; Cobbo 55'; Reynolds 65'; Staggs 67'; Goals: Reynolds 5/5 33', 36', 56', 66', 68'	[Report Report]	Tries: Penisini 2'; Ofahengaue 6'; Sivo 10'; Lane 71'; Goals: Gutherson 4/5 3', 8', 46 pen', 73'	Stadium: Suncorp Stadium; Attendance: 36,289; Referee: Todd Smith

Round 26: 31 August 2024	Parramatta Eels	44–40	St. George Illawarra Dragons	Parramatta
15:00 AEST	Tries: Penisini 3'; Sivo 8', 55', 61'; Gutherson 22', 43'; Tago 30'; Lane 36'; Brown 40'; Goals: Asi 4/9 10', 24', 38', 44'	[Report Report]	Tries: Muhleisen 14'; Lomax 50'; Mat Feagai 69', 77', 79'; Sloan 72', 76'; Goals: Lomax 6/7 15', 51', 71', 73', 76', 77'	Stadium: CommBank Stadium; Attendance: 21,623; Referee: Wyatt Raymond

Round 27: 6 September 2024	Wests Tigers	26–60	Parramatta Eels	Campbelltown
18:00 AEST	Tries: Feledy 11'; Tupou 14'; L. Fainu 48'; Papali'i 66'; Staines 79'; Goals: Koroisau 2/3 16', 50'; Mason 1/1 67'; L. Fainu 0/1; Sin bin: Koroisau (yellow card) 51' to 61'	[Report Report]	Tries: Sivo 6', 55'; Asi 20'; Hands 29'; Penisini 35', 40'; Cartwright 52'; Gutherson 61', 64'; Campbell-Gillard 68'; Lussick 73'; Goals: Asi 6/9 8', 30', 36', 54', 63', 65'; Gutherson 1/1 70'; Campbell-Gillard 1/1 75'	Stadium: Campbelltown Sports Stadium; Attendance: 17,311; Referee: Peter Gough

== Player statistics ==
As of 6 September 2024

Players with no appearances are not included on the list.

Player	Apps	T	C	PG	FG	Total
(Australia) Matt Arthur	3	0	0	0	0	0
(Samoa) Daejarn Asi	14	3	17	0	1	47
(New Zealand) Dylan Brown	24	5	0	0	0	20
(Australia) Reagan Campbell-Gillard	24	2	1	0	0	10
(Australia) Bryce Cartwright	20	4	0	0	0	16
(Australia) Matt Doorey	4	0	0	0	0	0
(New Zealand) Wiremu Greig	7	0	0	0	0	0
(Australia) Clinton Gutherson	21	9	29	9	0	112
(Australia) Charlie Guymer	2	0	0	0	0	0
(Australia) Brendan Hands	19	1	0	0	0	4
(New Zealand) Morgan Harper	8	4	0	0	0	16
(Australia) J'maine Hopgood	12	1	0	0	0	4
(Australia) Dan Keir	6	0	0	0	0	0
(Australia) Shaun Lane	24	4	0	0	0	16
(Australia) Joey Lussick	19	5	0	0	0	20
(Cook Islands) Makahesi Makatoa	10	0	0	0	0	0
(Australia) Ryan Matterson	16	0	0	0	0	0
(Lebanon) Mitchell Moses	8	4	16	3	0	54
(Italy) Luca Moretti	11	1	0	0	0	4
(New Zealand) Lorenzo Mulitalo	1	0	0	0	0	0
(Tonga) Joe Ofahengaue	24	2	0	0	0	8
(New Zealand) Ofahiki Ogden	2	0	0	0	0	0
(Samoa) Junior Paulo	16	2	0	0	0	8
(Tonga) Will Penisini	23	10	0	0	0	40
(Australia) Sean Russell	21	5	2	1	0	26
(Australia) Ethan Sanders	2	0	0	0	0	0
(New Zealand) Bailey Simonsson	10	4	0	0	0	16
(Fiji) Maika Sivo	12	17	0	0	0	68
(Australia) Blaize Talagi	19	11	0	0	0	44
(Australia) Jake Tago	7	4	0	0	0	16
(Samoa) Kelma Tuilagi	16	3	0	0	0	12

== Awards ==
The Ken Thornett Medal was held on 10 September to recognise the best-performed players of the season for the club.

Award	Recipient
Ken Thornett Medal (NRL Player of the Year)	Reagan Campbell-Gillard
Nathan Hindmarsh NRL Players' Player Award	Clinton Gutherson
Jack Gibson NRL Coaches' Award	Clinton Gutherson
Eric Grothe NRL Rookie of the Year Award	Blaize Talagi
Blue & Gold Army NRL Award	Clinton Gutherson
Ray Price NRL Community Award	Shaun Lane
Bob O'Reilly NSW Cup Player of the Year	Brock Parker
Geoff Gerard NSW Cup Coaches' Award	Dan Keir
Steve Ella Jersey Flegg Player of the Year	Saxon Pryke
Brett Kenny Jersey Flegg Coaches' Award	Teancum Brown
Michael Cronin Club Person of the Year	Don Musson

== NRL Women's team ==
2024 Parramatta Eels Women season
- NRLW Rank: 5th
- Play-off result: DNQ
- 2024 record: Wins: 5; losses: 4
- Points scored: For: 160; against: 184

Team information
- CEO: Jim Sarantinos
- Coach: (Australia) Steve Georgallis
- Captain: (Australia) Mahalia Murphy
- Stadium: CommBank Stadium (Capacity: 30,000); Eric Tweedale Stadium (Capacity: 5,000)
- Avg. attendance: 950
- Agg. attendance: 1,900

Top scorers
- Tries: (Australia) Monique Donovan (Australia) Rory Owen (5 each)
- Goals: (Australia) Rachael Pearson (22)
- Points: (Australia) Rachael Pearson (48)
← 2023	List of seasons	2025 →

The 2024 Parramatta Eels Women season is the 4th season in the club's history and in the NRL Women's Premiership. Coached by Steve Georgallis for his first season, and captained by Mahalia Murphy, the team compete in the 2024 NRL Women's Premiership during the season.

== Squad information ==
2024 Parramatta Eels Women's squad
Top 24 squad			Development list	Coaching staff
Elsie Albert – PR; Tyla Amiatu – PR, LK; Rosemarie Beckett – HB, FB, HK; Pihuka Berryman-Duff – FE; Kennedy Cherrington – LK, PR; Rueben Cherrington – HK, LK; Abbi Church – FB; Monique Donovan – WG, CE	Breanna Eales – PR, LK; Kate Fallon – WG; Zali Fay – WG; Jade Fonua – LK; Chloe Jackson – SR; Madeline Jones – PR, LK; Boss Kapua – SR; Rosie Kelly – CE	Ruby-Jean Kennard-Ellis – PR; Mia Middleton – WG, CE; Mahalia Murphy (c) – SR, CE; Rory Owen – CE; Rachael Pearson – HB; Taneka Todhunter – HK, HB; Cassey Tohi-Hiku – FE, CE; Lindsay Tui – CE	Tafao Asaua – PR; Yasmine Baker – FB; Aaliyah Haumono – CE; Chelsea Makira – PR, LK	Head coach: Steve Georgallis; Legend: (c) Captain(s); (vc) Vice-captain(s); Updated: 11 August 2024; Source(s): Parramatta Eels

== Season ==
=== Ladder ===
Pos	Team	Pld	W	D	L	PF	PA	PD	Pts	Qualification
1	Brisbane Broncos (M)	9	7	0	2	272	156	+116	14	Advance to finals series
2	Sydney Roosters (P)	9	7	0	2	222	112	+110	14	Advance to finals series
3	Newcastle Knights	9	6	0	3	238	132	+106	12	Advance to finals series
4	Cronulla-Sutherland Sharks	9	6	0	3	146	122	+24	12	Advance to finals series
5	Parramatta Eels	9	5	0	4	160	184	−24	10	
6	North Queensland Cowboys	9	4	0	5	137	218	−81	8	
7	Canberra Raiders	9	3	0	6	194	216	−22	6	
8	Gold Coast Titans	9	3	0	6	128	191	−63	6	
9	St. George Illawarra Dragons	9	2	0	7	178	234	−56	4	
10	Wests Tigers	9	2	0	7	108	218	−110	4	

Source: National Rugby League
(M) Minor premiers; (P) Premiers

=== Results by round ===
Round	1	2	3	4	5	6	7	8	9
Ground	A	H	A	A	H	H	H	A	H
Result	W	L	W	W	L	L	W	W	L
Position	3	6	3	3	5	6	5	5	5
Points	2	2	4	6	6	6	8	10	10

Source: National Rugby League
A = Away; H = Home; W = Win; D = Draw; L = Loss

=== Matches ===
The league fixtures were announced on 13 November 2023.

Win Draw Loss Fixtures

Round 1: 27 July 2024	Brisbane Broncos	10–22	Parramatta Eels	Brisbane
12:45 AEST	Tries: Robinson 4'; Lenarduzzi 43'; Goals: Teitzel 0/1; Denman 1/1 45'; Sin bin: Nu'uausala (yellow card) 60' to 70'	[Report Report]	Tries: Fay 24'; Owen 27'; Donovan 39'; K. Cherrington 52'; Goals: Pearson 3/5 25', 54', 62 pen' Sin bin: K. Cherrington (yellow card) 60' to 70'	Stadium: Suncorp Stadium; Attendance: 10,382; Referee: Rochelle Tamarua

Round 2: 4 August 2024	Parramatta Eels	16–18	Cronulla-Sutherland Sharks	Moore Park
12:00 AEST	Tries: K. Cherrington 3'; Donovan 17'; Owen 58'; Goals: Pearson 2/3 4', 59'	[Report Report]	Tries: Johnston 7'; Taylor 39'; Biddle 64'; Goals: Preston 3/3 9', 40', 65'	Stadium: Allianz Stadium; Attendance: 1,166; Referee: Luke Saldern

Round 3: 11 August 2024	North Queensland Cowboys	6–20	Parramatta Eels	Brisbane
12:00 AEST	Tries: Polata 20'; Goals: Dibb 1/1 21'	[Report Report]	Tries: Kelly 13'; Beckett 29', 40'; Church 56'; Goals: Pearson 2/4 15', 31'	Stadium: Totally Workwear Stadium; Attendance: 1,393; Referee: Daniel Luttringer

Round 4: 18 August 2024	Wests Tigers	10–12	Parramatta Eels	Campbelltown
18:10 AEST	Tries: Pio 3'; Pollard 60'; Goals: Piliae-Rasabale 1/2 4'	[Report Report]	Tries: Donovan 18'; K. Cherrington 56'; Goals: Pearson 2/2 19', 57'	Stadium: Campbelltown Sports Stadium; Referee: Damian Brady

Round 5: 24 August 2024	Parramatta Eels	16–36	Newcastle Knights	Merrylands
11:00 AEST	Tries: Tohi-Hiku 30'; Murphy 42'; Beckett 44'; Goals: Pearson 2/3 43', 45'	[Report Report]	Tries: Upton 2', 69'; Higgins 3'; White 13'; Roache 19'; Albert-Jones 39'; Jones 62'; Goals: Roche 4/8 5', 14', 56 pen', 69'	Stadium: Eric Tweedale Stadium; Referee: Belinda Sharpe

Round 6: 31 August 2024	Parramatta Eels	14–42	St. George Illawarra Dragons	Parramatta
12:45 AEST	Tries: Donovan 7'; Owen 23'; Pearson 55'; Goals: Pearson 1/3 55'	[Report Report]	Tries: Law 1'; Browne 18', 58'; Koster 27'; Hopkins 39'; Berry 41', 43'; Clancy 67'; Goals: McGregor 5/8 2', 40', 42', 45', 68'	Stadium: CommBank Stadium; Referee: Daniel Luttringer

Round 7: 8 September 2024	Parramatta Eels	24–14	Gold Coast Titans	Merrylands
13:45 AEST	Tries: Albert 3', 66'; Donovan 8'; Owen 59'; Goals: Pearson 4/4 4', 9', 61', 67'	[Report Report]	Tries: Bass 12'; Guthrie 33'; Arakua 51'; Goals: Brown 1/3 52'	Stadium: Eric Tweedale Stadium; Attendance: 734; Referee: Luke Saldern

Round 8: 15 September 2024	Canberra Raiders	16–18	Parramatta Eels	Canberra
13:45 AEST	Tries: Bartlett 42'; Taufa 57'; Tungai 69'; Goals: Temara 2/3 58', 69'	[Report Report]	Tries: Murphy 4'; Amiatu 23'; Owen 64'; Goals: Pearson 3/4 5', 24', 67 pen'	Stadium: GIO Stadium; Attendance: 1,928; Referee: Karra-Lee Nolan

Round 9: 22 September 2024	Parramatta Eels	18–32	Sydney Roosters	Parramatta
15:15 AEST	Tries: Murphy 23'; Fay 42'; Beckett 61'; Goals: Pearson 3/3 23', 44', 62'	[Report Report]	Tries: Bremner 1', 49'; Wood 12'; Kernick 27'; Hall 52'; Fressard 56'; Goals: Kelleher 4/6 2', 13', 29', 50'	Stadium: CommBank Stadium; Referee: Ziggy Przeklasa-Adamski

== Player statistics ==
As of 22 September 2024

Players with no appearances are not included on the list.

Player	Apps	T	C	PG	FG	Total
(Papua New Guinea) Elsie Albert	9	2	0	0	0	8
(Australia) Tyla Amiatu	8	1	0	0	0	4
(Samoa) Tafao Asaua	2	0	0	0	0	0
(Australia) Rosemarie Beckett	8	4	0	0	0	16
(Australia) Kennedy Cherrington	6	3	0	0	0	12
(Australia) Rueben Cherrington	1	0	0	0	0	0
(Australia) Abbi Church	9	1	0	0	0	4
(Australia) Monique Donovan	9	5	0	0	0	20
(Australia) Breanna Eales	4	0	0	0	0	0
(Australia) Zali Fay	9	2	0	0	0	8
(Tonga) Jade Fonua	9	0	0	0	0	0
(Australia) Chloe Jackson	8	0	0	0	0	0
(Australia) Madeline Jones	9	0	0	0	0	0
(Australia) Boss Kapua	1	0	0	0	0	0
(New Zealand) Rosie Kelly	9	1	0	0	0	4
(Australia) Ruby-Jean Kennard-Ellis	3	0	0	0	0	0
(Australia) Mahalia Murphy	9	3	0	0	0	12
(Australia) Rory Owen	9	5	0	0	0	20
(Australia) Rachael Pearson	9	1	20	2	0	48
(Australia) Taneka Todhunter	9	0	0	0	0	0
(Tonga) Cassey Tohi-Hiku	9	1	0	0	0	4
(Australia) Lindsay Tui	4	0	0	0	0	0
