= 2023 Parramatta Eels season =

77th Parramatta Eels season

- NRL Rank: 10th
- Play-off result: DNQ
- 2023 record: Wins: 12; losses: 12
- Points scored: For: 587; against: 574

Team information
- CEO: Jim Sarantinos
- Coach: (Australia) Brad Arthur
- Captain: (Australia) Clinton Gutherson (Samoa) Junior Paulo
- Stadium: CommBank Stadium (Capacity: 30,000); TIO Stadium (Capacity: 12,500)
- Avg. attendance: 18,314 (Home); 21,195 (Home & Away)
- Agg. attendance: 219,773 (Home); 508,670 (Home & Away)
- High attendance: 26,755 (16 April vs Canterbury-Bankstown Bulldogs, Round 7)

Top scorers
- Tries: (Fiji) Maika Sivo (20)
- Goals: (Lebanon) Mitchell Moses (69)
- Points: (Lebanon) Mitchell Moses (169)
← 2022	List of seasons	2024 →

The 2023 Parramatta Eels season was the 77th in the club's history. Coached by Brad Arthur and co-captained by Clinton Gutherson and Junior Paulo, they competed in the NRL's 2023 Telstra Premiership but did not qualify for the finals. The club had 35,015 members for the year.

== Background ==
The Parramatta Eels kicked off the 2023 NRL season on 2 March against the Melbourne Storm at home, however lost 12-16 in golden point extra time. The Eels' first victory of the season was in round 4 against the Penrith Panthers (17-16 golden point) in the Western Sydney Derby at home. In round 26, Parramatta jeopardised Penrith's minor premiership run by defeating them 32-18 at BlueBet Stadium. The following week, the Eels had a bye and finished tenth in the competition.

== Squad information ==
The NRL playing squad and coaching staff of the Parramatta Eels for the 2023 NRL season is listed below.

Parramatta Eels
Top 30 squad			Development players	Coaching staff
Daejarn Asi – FE, HB, CE; Waqa Blake – CE, WG; Dylan Brown – FE, HB; Reagan Campbell-Gillard – PR; Bryce Cartwright – SR; Andrew Davey – SR; Matt Doorey – SR; Haze Dunster – WG; Wiremu Greig – PR; Clint Gutherson (c) – FB	Josh Hodgson – HK; J'maine Hopgood – LK, SR; Shaun Lane – SR; Samuel Loizou – CE; Makahesi Makatoa – PR; Ryan Matterson – SR, LK, FE; Jirah Momoisea – SR, PR; Mitchell Moses – HB; Jack Murchie – SR; Joe Ofahengaue – PR, LK	Ofahiki Ogden – PR; Junior Paulo (c) – PR; Will Penisini – CE; Ky Rodwell – PR, LK; Sean Russell – WG, CE, FB; Bailey Simonsson – CE, WG; Maika Sivo – WG	Zac Cini – CE; Jabriel Kalache – FE; Toni Mataele – SR; Blaize Talagi – FE; Extended squad: Brendan Hands – HK; Isaac Lumelume – WG; Arthur Miller-Stephen – WG; Luca Moretti – LK, PR, SR	Manager: Mark O’Neill (General Manager of Football); Head coach: Brad Arthur; Assistant coaches: Steve Antonelli; Trent Barrett; Steve Murphy; Nathan Cayless (NSW Cup coach); Craig Brennan (Jersey Flegg coach); Legend: (c) Captain(s); (vc) Vice-captain(s); Updated: 19 August 2023; Source(s): Eels Team Profiles; NRL Squad Tracker

== Transfers ==
In:

Nat.	Pos.	Name	From	Transfer window	Date	Ref.
(England)	HK	Josh Hodgson	Canberra Raiders	Pre-season	December 2021
(Australia)	LK	J'maine Hopgood	Penrith Panthers	Pre-season	May 2022
(New Zealand)	PR	Jirah Momoisea	Newcastle Knights	Pre-season	June 2022
(Australia)	SR	Jack Murchie	New Zealand Warriors	Pre-season	October 2022
(Australia)	SR	Matt Doorey	Canterbury-Bankstown Bulldogs	Pre-season	November 2022
(New Zealand)	FE	Daejarn Asi	New Zealand Warriors	Pre-season	November 2022
(Australia)	SR	Andrew Davey	Canterbury-Bankstown Bulldogs	Mid-season	April 2023
(Tonga)	LK	Joe Ofahengaue	Wests Tigers	Mid-season	May 2023
(Australia)	HK	Joey Lussick	St Helens	Mid-season	July 2023

Out:

Nat.	Pos.	Name	To	Transfer window	Date	Ref.
(New Zealand)	SR	Marata Niukore	New Zealand Warriors	Pre-season	November 2021
(New Zealand)	SR	Isaiah Papali'i	Wests Tigers	Pre-season	November 2021
(Australia)	HK	Reed Mahoney	Canterbury-Bankstown Bulldogs	Pre-season	November 2021
(Australia)	LK	Ray Stone	Dolphins	Pre-season	December 2021
(Samoa)	PR	Oregon Kaufusi	Cronulla-Sutherland Sharks	Pre-season	December 2021
(Australia)	CE	Tom Opacic	Hull Kingston Rovers	Pre-season	August 2022
(Fiji)	WG	Solomone Naiduki	Hurricanes (rugby union)	Pre-season	September 2022
(New Zealand)	CE	Hayze Perham	Canterbury-Bankstown Bulldogs	Pre-season	September 2022
(Australia)	PR	David Hollis	Newcastle Knights	Pre-season	September 2022
(Italy)	LK	Nathan Brown	Sydney Roosters	Mid-season	March 2023
(Australia)	HB	Jake Arthur	Manly Warringah Sea Eagles	Mid-season	May 2023
(Australia)	HK	Mitch Rein	Retired	Mid-season	June 2023

== Pre-season ==
Round 1: 11 February 2023	Penrith Panthers	22–16	Parramatta Eels	Sydney
18:00 AEDT (UTC+11:00)	Tries: Sommerton 7'; Jenkins 20'; McLean 38'; Cohen 68'; Goals: Falls 3/4 9', 22', 39'	[Report Report]	Tries: Cini 26', 78'; Lumelume 57'; Goals: Russell 2/3 58', 78'	Stadium: Bluebet Stadium; Attendance: 3,525; Referee: Wyatt Raymond

Round 2: 17 February 2023	Newcastle Knights	14–36	Parramatta Eels	Gosford
17:55 AEDT (UTC+11:00)	Tries: Young 4'; Best 28'; Marzhew 67'; Goals: Hastings 1/3 30'	[Report Report]	Tries: Doorey 10'; Gutherson 18'; Russell 24', 58'; Brown 36'; Murchie 51'; Lumelume 78'; Goals: Moses 4/7 12', 20', 38', 53'	Stadium: Industree Group Stadium; Attendance: 10,744; Referee: Grant Atkins

== Regular season ==
=== Ladder ===
2023 NRL season
Pos	Team	Pld	W	D	L	B	PF	PA	PD	Pts
1	Penrith Panthers (P)	24	18	0	6	3	645	312	+333	42
2	Brisbane Broncos	24	18	0	6	3	639	425	+214	42
3	Melbourne Storm	24	16	0	8	3	627	459	+168	38
4	New Zealand Warriors	24	16	0	8	3	572	448	+124	38
5	Newcastle Knights	24	14	1	9	3	626	451	+175	35
6	Cronulla-Sutherland Sharks	24	14	0	10	3	619	497	+122	34
7	Sydney Roosters	24	13	0	11	3	472	496	−24	32
8	Canberra Raiders	24	13	0	11	3	486	623	−137	32
9	South Sydney Rabbitohs	24	12	0	12	3	564	505	+59	30
10	Parramatta Eels	24	12	0	12	3	587	574	+13	30
11	North Queensland Cowboys	24	12	0	12	3	546	542	+4	30
12	Manly Warringah Sea Eagles	24	11	1	12	3	545	539	+6	29
13	Dolphins	24	9	0	15	3	520	631	−111	24
14	Gold Coast Titans	24	9	0	15	3	527	653	−126	24
15	Canterbury-Bankstown Bulldogs	24	7	0	17	3	438	769	−331	20
16	St. George Illawarra Dragons	24	5	0	19	3	474	673	−199	16
17	Wests Tigers	24	4	0	20	3	385	675	−290	14

=== Result by round ===
Round	1	2	3	4	5	6	7	8	9	10	11	12	13	14	15	16	17	18	19	20	21	22	23	24	25	26	27
Ground	H	H	A	H	A	A	H	H	H	N	A	A	H	–	A	H	A	–	H	H	A	A	H	A	H	A	–
Result	L	L	L	W	L	W	W	L	W	L	L	W	W	B	W	W	W	B	L	W	L	L	W	L	L	W	B
Position	12	16	16	15	15	14	12	13	12	13	14	13	13	12	9	8	7	6	7	7	8	11	9	10	11	11	10
Points	0	0	0	2	2	4	6	6	8	8	8	10	12	14	16	18	20	22	22	24	24	24	26	26	26	28	30

Source: National Rugby League
A = Away; H = Home; N = Neutral; B = Bye; W = Win; D = Draw; L = Loss

=== Matches ===
The league fixtures were announced on 10 November 2022.

Win Draw Loss

Round 1: 2 March 2023	Parramatta Eels	12–16 (g.p.)	Melbourne Storm	Parramatta
20:00 AEDT	Tries: Penisini 29'; Paulo 58'; Goals: Moses 2/3 4 pen', 59'	[Report Report]	Tries: Meaney 46'; Tonumaipea 62'; H. Grant 83'; Goals: Meaney 2/2 47', 63'	Stadium: CommBank Stadium; Attendance: 17,301; Referee: Ashley Klein

Round 2: 10 March 2023	Parramatta Eels	26–30	Cronulla-Sutherland Sharks	Parramatta
18:00 AEDT	Tries: Campbell-Gillard 3'; Sivo 5', 43'; Moses 33', 72'; Goals: Moses 3/5 4', 44', 72'	[Report Report]	Tries: Nikora 14'; Kennedy 18', 36', 55'; Mulitalo 60'; Goals: Trindall 5/5 16', 19', 37', 56', 62'	Stadium: CommBank Stadium; Attendance: 16,663; Referee: Gerard Sutton

Round 3: 16 March 2023	Manly Warringah Sea Eagles	34–30	Parramatta Eels	Brookvale
19:50 AEDT	Tries: Garrick 7'; T. Trbojevic 25', 51'; Parker 54'; Olakau'atu 68', 76'; Goals: Garrick 5/7 9', 18 pen', 27', 69', 76'	[Report Report]	Tries: Gutherson 31', 43'; Doorey 34'; Sivo 72', 77'; Hodgson 75'; Goals: Moses 3/6 33', 43', 75'	Stadium: 4 Pines Park; Attendance: 13,363; Referee: Adam Gee

Round 4: 23 March 2023	Parramatta Eels	17–16 (g.p.)	Penrith Panthers	Parramatta
19:50 AEDT	Tries: Cartwright 14'; Hands 56'; Goals: Moses 4/4 15', 26 pen', 58', 64 pen' Field goals: Moses 81'; Sin bin: Paulo (yellow card) 79' to 83'	[Report Report]	Tries: Edwards 33'; Hosking 71'; Goals: Cleary 3/3 35', 39 pen', 72'; Field goals: Cleary 79 (2pt)' Sin bin: Kenny (yellow card) 81' to 83'	Stadium: CommBank Stadium; Attendance: 16,342; Referee: Ashley Klein

Round 5: 30 March 2023	Sydney Roosters	28–20	Parramatta Eels	Moore Park
16:05 AEDT	Tries: Hutchison 13'; Tupou 32'; Keary 38', 71'; Paulo 54'; Goals: Walker 4/6 15', 39', 63 pen', 72'	[Report Report]	Tries: Gutherson 43'; Simonsson 76'; Sivo 78'; Goals: Moses 4/4 10 pen', 43', 76', 78'; Sin bin: Penisini (yellow card) 5' to 15'; Simonsson (yellow card) 23' to 33'	Stadium: Allianz Stadium; Attendance: 20,886; Referee: Grant Atkins

Round 6: 10 April 2023	Wests Tigers	22–28	Parramatta Eels	Sydney Olympic Park
16:00 AEST	Tries: To'a 23'; Kepaoa 49'; Naden 64'; Tupou 71'; Goals: Doueihi 2/3 25', 66'; Koroisau 0/1; Brooks 1/1 77 pen'	[Report Report]	Tries: Gutherson 11'; Penisini 14'; Cartwright 33'; Sivo 45', 75'; Goals: Moses 4/5 12', 16', 35', 76'	Stadium: Accor Stadium; Attendance: 28,611; Referee: Ben Cummins

Round 7: 16 April 2023	Parramatta Eels	30–4	Canterbury-Bankstown Bulldogs	Parramatta
16:05 AEST	Tries: Penisini 21'; Sivo 25', 76'; Moses 27'; Campbell-Gillard 62'; Goals: Moses 5/6 22', 27', 64', 74 pen', 77'	[Report Report]	Tries: Alamoti 49'; Goals: Burton 0/1	Stadium: CommBank Stadium; Attendance: 26,755; Referee: Chris Butler

Round 8: 21 April 2023	Parramatta Eels	16–26	Brisbane Broncos	Darwin
19:30 ACST	Tries: Gutherson 19'; Sivo 58'; Russell 63'; Goals: Moses 2/3 21', 60'; Sin bin: Hopgood (yellow card) 46' to 56'	[Report Report]	Tries: Farnworth 14'; Reynolds 23'; Mam 25'; Staggs 32'; Goals: Reynolds 5/7 4 pen', 24', 27', 46 pen', 55 pen' Sin bin: Mam (yellow card) 62' to 72'	Stadium: TIO Stadium; Attendance: 11,864; Referee: Ashley Klein

Round 9: 28 April 2023	Parramatta Eels	43–12	Newcastle Knights	Parramatta
18:00 AEST	Tries: Brown 1'; Moses 9'; Gutherson 22', 34', 46'; Russell 37'; Paulo 69'; Goals: Moses 7/7 3', 10', 24', 35', 38', 47', 71'; Field goals: Moses 79'	[Report Report]	Tries: Croker 6'; Young 62'; Goals: Miller 2/2 7', 64'	Stadium: CommBank Stadium; Attendance: 15,875; Referee: Chris Sutton

Round 10: 7 May 2023	Gold Coast Titans	26–24	Parramatta Eels	Brisbane
18:25 AEST	Tries: Foran 8', 10'; Khan-Pereira 22', 50'; Kelly 71'; Goals: Boyd 3/5 12', 24', 51'	[Report Report]	Tries: Sivo 1', 42', 54'; Gutherson 56'; Davey 76'; Goals: Moses 1/4 58'; Gutherson 1/1 76'; Sin bin: Gutherson (yellow card) 7' to 17'	Stadium: Suncorp Stadium; Attendance: 46,835; Referee: Chris Butler

Round 11: 13 May 2023	Canberra Raiders	26–18	Parramatta Eels	Canberra
19:35 AEST	Tries: Hopoate 36'; Young 42'; Kris 45'; Timoko 74'; Goals: Croker 5/6 5 pen', 38', 43', 47', 64 pen' Sin bin: Horsburgh (yellow card) 22' to 32'	[Report Report]	Tries: Hopgood 32'; Simonsson 53'; Sivo 67'; Goals: Gutherson 3/4 14 pen', 34', 69'	Stadium: GIO Stadium; Attendance: 17,414; Referee: Grant Atkins

Round 12: 19 May 2023	South Sydney Rabbitohs	16–36	Parramatta Eels	Moore Park
20:00 AEST	Tries: Johnston 7', 36'; Graham 47'; Goals: Mitchell 2/3 38', 48'	[Report Report]	Tries: Russell 2'; Simonsson 26', 57'; Cartwright 52'; Brown 71'; Penisini 75'; Goals: Moses 6/6 3', 28', 54', 58', 73', 76'	Stadium: Allianz Stadium; Attendance: 27,432; Referee: Ashley Klein

Round 13: 26 May 2023	Parramatta Eels	24–16	North Queensland Cowboys	Parramatta
20:00 AEST	Tries: Greig 17'; Sivo 55'; Russell 63'; Moses 78'; Goals: Moses 4/4 18', 56', 64', 79'	[Report Report]	Tries: Drinkwater 7'; Feldt 68', 75'; Goals: Townsend 2/3 9', 75'	Stadium: CommBank Stadium; Attendance: 14,810; Referee: Liam Kennedy

Round 14 (Bye for Parramatta Eels)

Round 15: 12 June 2023	Canterbury-Bankstown Bulldogs	12–34	Parramatta Eels	Sydney Olympic Park
16:00 AEST	Tries: Burton 15'; Perham 58'; Goals: Burton 2/2 16', 59'	[Report Report]	Tries: Gutherson 4', 22', 24'; Simonsson 30'; Penisini 50'; Sivo 64'; Goals: Moses 5/6 6', 23', 25', 31', 65'	Stadium: Accor Stadium; Attendance: 33,866; Referee: Liam Kennedy

Round 16: 17 June 2023	Parramatta Eels	34–4	Manly Warringah Sea Eagles	Parramatta
17:30 AEST (UTC+10:00)	Tries: Ogden 9'; Simonsson 14', 62'; Gutherson 27'; Hopgood 35'; Makatoa 75'; Goals: Gutherson 5/6 11', 16', 29', 36', 63'; Sin bin: Ogden (yellow card) 79' to 80'	[Report Report]	Tries: Tuipulotu 22'; Goals: Garrick 0/1; Sin bin: Weekes (yellow card) 8' to 18'	Stadium: CommBank Stadium; Attendance: 21,296; Referee: Chris Butler

Round 17: 24 June 2023	Dolphins	20–48	Parramatta Eels	Sunshine Coast
15:00 AEST (UTC+10:00)	Tries: McGrady 3'; Tabuai-Fidow 49', 66'; Te Whare 55'; Goals: Isaako 2/4 50', 67'	[Report Report]	Tries: Davey 6'; Hopgood 11'; Penisini 20', 25'; Gutherson 23', 63'; Simonsson 31'; Russell 38'; Goals: Moses 8/8 7', 13', 22', 24', 26', 33', 40', 65'	Stadium: Sunshine Coast Stadium; Attendance: 8,821; Referee: Peter Gough

Round 18 (Bye for Parramatta Eels)

Round 19: 8 July 2023	Parramatta Eels	10–46	New Zealand Warriors	Parramatta
17:30 AEST (UTC+10:00)	Tries: Simonsson 15'; Lane 66'; Goals: Russell 1/2 67'	[Report Report]	Tries: Metcalf 6', 33'; Montoya 26', 30'; Walker 39'; Barnett 48', 70'; Watene-Zelezniak 58'; Goals: Johnson 7/8 8', 27', 32', 34', 40', 49', 72'	Stadium: CommBank Stadium; Attendance: 21,696; Referee: Adam Gee

Round 20: 16 July 2023	Parramatta Eels	25–24	Gold Coast Titans	Parramatta
18:15 AEST (UTC+10:00)	Tries: Campbell-Gillard 5'; Penisini 11'; Cartwright 43'; Gutherson 66'; Goals: Moses 4/5 6', 12', 35 pen', 67'; Field goals: Moses 74'; Sin bin: Sivo (yellow card) 21' to 31'; Campbell-Gillard (yellow card) 25' to 35'	[Report Report]	Tries: Khan-Pereira 16', 30'; Sami 28'; Boyd 48'; Goals: Boyd 4/6 29', 40 pen', 49', 59 pen'	Stadium: CommBank Stadium; Attendance: 12,599; Referee: Chris Butler

Round 21: 22 July 2023	North Queensland Cowboys	24–16	Parramatta Eels	Townsville
19:35 AEST (UTC+10:00)	Tries: Hiku 3'; Valemei 10', 25'; Drinkwater 54'; Goals: Holmes 4/5 5', 11', 50 pen', 55'; Sin bin: Holmes (yellow card) 36' to 46'	[Report Report]	Tries: Russell 13'; Moses 69', 74'; Goals: Moses 2/3 70', 75'	Stadium: Queensland Country Bank Stadium; Attendance: 20,710; Referee: Grant Atkins

Round 22: 28 July 2023	Melbourne Storm	46–16	Parramatta Eels	Melbourne
20:00 AEST (UTC+10:00)	Tries: Grant 11', 22'; Hughes 27'; Katoa 37'; King 47'; Seve 58'; Munster 67'; Warbrick 76'; Goals: Meaney 7/8 12', 24', 28', 38', 48', 60', 68'	[Report Report]	Tries: Russell 4'; Hopgood 32'; Moretti 63'; Goals: Moses 2/3 32', 64'	Stadium: Marvel Stadium; Attendance: 20,429; Referee: Ashley Klein

Round 23: 6 August 2023	Parramatta Eels	26–20	St. George Illawarra Dragons	Parramatta
14:00 AEST (UTC+10:00)	Tries: Miller-Stephen 8'; Cartwright 11', 70'; Russell 58'; Paulo 63'; Goals: Moses 3/5 12', 64', 71'	[Report Report]	Tries: Ravalawa 19', 25', 38', 49'; Goals: Lomax 2/4 21', 39'	Stadium: CommBank Stadium; Attendance: 23,596; Referee: Ziggy Przeklasa-Adamski

Round 24: 11 August 2023	Brisbane Broncos	54–10	Parramatta Eels	Brisbane
20:00 AEST (UTC+10:00)	Tries: Reynolds 19'; Walters 26', 52'; Mariner 30', 43'; Farnworth 38'; Mam 43'; Capewell 66'; Walsh 73'; Goals: Reynolds 9/10 6 pen', 21', 28', 39', 44', 47', 53', 67', 74'	[Report Report]	Tries: Russell 63'; Brown 69'; Goals: Gutherson 1/2 70'	Stadium: The Gabba; Attendance: 29,005; Referee: Adam Gee

Round 25: 18 August 2023	Parramatta Eels	12–34	Sydney Roosters	Parramatta
20:00 AEST (UTC+10:00)	Tries: Cartwright 8'; Gutherson 62'; Goals: Gutherson 2/2 9', 63'	[Report Report]	Tries: Tedesco 24', 35'; Sua'ali'i 28', 51'; Wong 68'; Butcher 79'; Goals: Sua'ali'i 5/6 26', 29', 37', 70', 79'	Stadium: CommBank Stadium; Attendance: 20,076; Referee: Ashley Klein

Round 26: 24 August 2023	Penrith Panthers	18–32	Parramatta Eels	Penrith
19:50 AEST	Tries: Peachey 12'; Cleary 65'; Martin 75'; Jenkins 77'; Goals: Cleary 1/4 65'	[Report Report]	Tries: Sivo 3', 19', 23', 72'; Gutherson 36', 42'; Goals: Gutherson 4/6 5', 21 pen', 25', 43'; Brown 0/1	Stadium: BlueBet Stadium; Attendance: 21,525; Referee: Ben Cummins

Round 27 (Bye for Parramatta Eels)
