= Patrician Brothers' College, Blacktown =

- Patrician Brothers College

Location
- Blacktown, Greater Western Sydney, New South Wales; Australia; 33°46′28″S 150°54′33″E

Information
- Type: Single-sex secondary day school
- Motto: Christus Regnat (Christ Reigns)
- Religious affiliation: Patrician Brothers
- Denomination: Roman Catholic
- Established: 1952; 74 years ago
- Educational authority: New South Wales Education Standards Authority
- Oversight: Catholic Education Office, Diocese of Parramatta
- Principal: Chris Browne
- Gender: Male
- Enrolment: est~1,100
- Colours: Royal blue and yellow
- Website: www.patsblacktown.catholic.edu.au
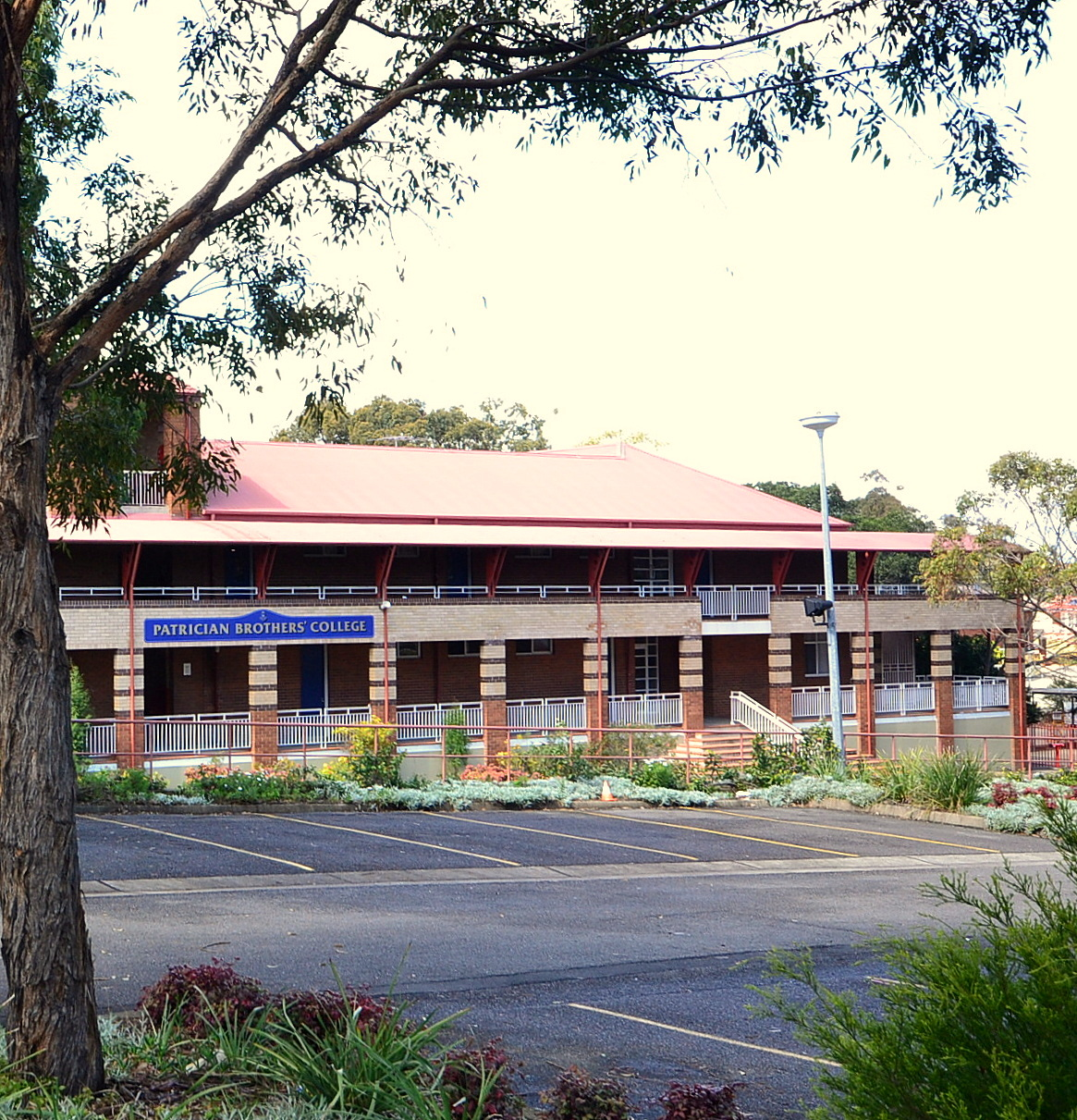

Patrician Brothers' College, Blacktown is a Roman Catholic single-sex secondary day school for boys, located in Blacktown, a western suburb of Sydney, New South Wales, Australia.

== History ==
The College was founded in 1952 by the Patrician Brothers to serve rural families of Blacktown and its surrounding districts. The school is located in Blacktown, Sydney. Under a restructure, the College saw its last Year 6 class graduate in 1997 and the first Year 11 cohort commence in 1998. This led to a school renovation with the addition of 11 classrooms, a technology block, a library, a school office, and an amphitheatre finished in 2013.

== College crest ==
The college crest consists of a Shield surmounted by a Crown and the motto Christus Regnat, Latin for "Christ Reigns". The Shield represents the Catholic Faith, while the White Star encircled by the Wreath of Laurel represents The Blessed Lady. The Cross and the Crown represent 'The Crowning Gift of Faith'.

== Extracurricular activities ==
The college takes part in the Metropolitan Catholic Schools (MCS) Competition and Combined Catholic Colleges (CCC) Tournaments. The school offers sports such as cricket, basketball, soccer, rugby league, touch football, rugby union, Australian rules football, golf, croquet, and swimming.

During the Arrive Alive Cup in 2007 the Patrician Brothers Blacktown progressed to the grand final. The match was telecast on Channel Nine. The MCS Rugby League Competition declared Patrician Brothers' Blacktown the most successful MCS school.

The college is also known for its results in public speaking and debating. In 2009, the Year 9 Debating Team progressed to the semi-finals of the CSDA Debating Competition. In 2011, the Year 12A Debating Team won the Catholic Schools' Debating Association Trophy, undefeated throughout the competition. In 2013, the senior teams progressed to the finals. In 2019, the Year 9 Debating Team won the Year 9 Metropolitan Champions in Sydney.

== Controversies ==
Former teacher Brother Martin Harmata pleaded guilty to sexually assaulting several boys including students at the school in the 1980s and was jailed for at least 3.5 years on 26 September 2013. Former Patrician Brother novice and relief teacher Alan James Pollock was also arrested on allegations of sexual abuse of students. Other teachers were reported as being 'under investigation'.

A third former teacher, a 57-year-old male, was arrested in February 2013 over offences alleged to have occurred between 1998 and 2002. The teacher has not been named.

On 18 December 2013, a fourth former teacher and brother, Michael Stanton, was arrested. Additional charges were laid against Michael Stanton in May 2014. The alleged offences occurred in 1980 against an 11-year-old boy. Michael Stanton pleaded guilty to the charges in October 2015. Alan James Pollock pleaded guilty to committing sexual offences against children in September 2014, and was sentenced to eight years gaol in December 2014.

The Catholic Education Office has published statements concerning Alan Pollock, Brother Martin Harmata, and Michael Stanton following their convictions.

== Notable alumni ==
- Josh Aloiai, current rugby league footballer for the Manly Warringah Sea Eagles and Samoa and formerly the Wests Tigers
- Jake Arthur, current rugby league footballer for the Manly Warringah Sea Eagles
- Matt Arthur, current rugby league footballer for the Parramatta Eels
- John Asiata, former professional rugby league footballer for the North Queensland Cowboys and Samoa
- Luke Boyd, Australian Olympic boxer
- Jamie Buhrer, former rugby league footballer for the Manly-Warringah Sea Eagles, Newcastle Knights and New South Wales
- Bryce Cartwright, current rugby league footballer for the Parramatta Eels
- Christian Crichton, former professional rugby league footballer for the Penrith Panthers, Canterbury-Bankstown Bulldogs and Samoa
- Stephen Crichton, current rugby league player for the Canterbury-Bankstown Bulldogs, New South Wales and Samoa
- Joshua Curran, current rugby league footballer for the Canterbury-Bankstown Bulldogs
- Sam Darley, current AFL player for the Western Bulldogs
- Brett Delaney, former professional rugby league footballer for the Leeds Rhinos and City Origin
- Jarred Farlow, former professional rugby league footballer for the Wests Tigers
- Anthony Field, The Blue Wiggle
- Andrew Fifita, former professional rugby league footballer for the Cronulla Sharks, Australia, Indigenous All Stars and Tonga
- David Fifita, former professional rugby league footballer for the Cronulla Sharks and Tonga
- Jake Foster, former professional rugby league player for the Canberra Raiders
- John Folau, current rugby union player for the NSW Waratahs
- Tyrell Fuimaono, current rugby league player for the St. George Illawarra Dragons
- Timothy Hodge, swimmer who represented Australia at 2016 Rio Paralympics
- Masada Iosefa, former professional rugby league footballer for the Dolphins, Wests Tigers and Samoa
- George Jennings, former rugby league footballer for the Melbourne Storm and Tonga
- Robert Jennings, current rugby league footballer for the Dolphins and Tonga
- Sione Katoa, former professional rugby league footballer for Penrith Panthers, Canterbury-Bankstown Bulldogs and Tonga
- Albert Kelly, former professional rugby league footballer for the Brisbane Broncos
- Grant Lambert, ex-state cricketer for the New South Wales Blues
- Daine Laurie, current rugby league footballer for the Canberra Raiders
- Spencer Leniu, current rugby league footballer for the Penrith Panthers
- Danny Levi, current rugby league footballer for the Leeds Rhinos, New Zealand and Samoa
- Luke Lewis, former professional rugby league footballer for the Cronulla Sharks, Penrith Panthers, City Origin, New South Wales and Australia
- Jeff Lima, former professional rugby league footballer for the Melbourne Storm, Canberra Raiders and New Zealand
- Matthew Lodge, current rugby league footballer for the Manly Sea Eagles
- Samuel Loizou, current rugby league footballer for the Parramatta Eels
- Jarome Luai, current rugby league footballer for the West Tigers, New South Wales and Samoa
- Soni Luke, current rugby league footballer for the Penrith Panthers and Tonga
- Taylan May, current rugby league footballer for the Penrith Panthers and Samoa
- Terrell May, current rugby league player for the Sydney Roosters and Samoa
- Tyrone May, current rugby league footballer for the Catalans Dragons and Samoa
- Marcelo Montoya, current rugby league footballer for the New Zealand Warriors and Fiji
- Junior Moors, former professional rugby league footballer for the Melbourne Storm and Samoa
- Matt Moylan, former rugby league footballer for the Penrith Panthers, Cronulla Sharks, New South Wales and Australia
- Brent Naden, current rugby league footballer for the Wests Tigers
- Arjun Nair, cricketer plays for Sydney Thunder in the Big Bash
- David Nofoaluma, former rugby league footballer for the Wests Tigers and Samoa
- Sean O'Sullivan, current rugby league footballer for the Dolphins
- Joseph Paulo, former rugby league footballer for St Helens, Samoa and United States
- Daniel Penese, former professional rugby league footballer for the Penrith Panthers now currently playing for the Wyong Roos in the NSW Cup
- Will Penisini, current rugby league player for the Parramatta Eels and Tonga
- Ben Rogers, ex-rugby league footballer for the Penrith Panthers, South Sydney Rabbitohs, St George Illawarra Dragons and Newcastle Knights
- Sean Rooney, football player for Salgaocar S.C. in the I-league
- Sean Russell, current rugby league player for the Parramatta Eels
- Jarrod Sammut, rugby league footballer for the Bradford Bulls and ex-rugby union footballer for Malta
- Ethan Sanders, current rugby league footballer for the Canberra Raiders
- Tim Simona, former rugby league footballer for the Wests Tigers
- Chris Smith, former rugby league footballer for the Penrith Panthers, Sydney Roosters and Canterbury-Bankstown Bulldogs
- Luke Sommerton, current rugby league footballer for the Penrith Panthers
- Izack Tago, current rugby league footballer for the Penrith Panthers and Samoa
- Jake Tago, current rugby league footballer for the Parramatta Eels
- Zeb Taia, former professional rugby league footballer for the Newcastle Knights and New Zealand
- Jayden Tanner, former rugby league footballer for the Canterbury-Bankstown Bulldogs
- Jacob Townsend, AFL premiership winner with the Richmond Tigers
- Joseph Tramontana, current rugby league footballer for the Blacktown Workers Sea Eagles and Italy
- Sunia Turuva, current rugby league footballer for the Penrith Panthers and Fiji
- Siosaia Vave, former professional rugby league footballer for the Parramatta Eels and Tonga
- Dallin Watene-Zelezniak, current rugby league footballer for the New Zealand Warriors and New Zealand
- Matthew Wright, former professional rugby league footballer for the Manly Warringah Sea Eagles and Samoa
- Sam Wykes, former rugby union footballer for the Western Force and NSW Waratahs
- Jeremy Finlayson, AFL Footballer for GWS Giants

== See also ==
- Catholic Education in the Diocese of Parramatta
- List of non-government schools in New South Wales
- Patrician Brothers
