= Daejarn Asi =

Samoa international rugby league footballer

Personal information
- Born: 15 August 2000 (age 26) Christchurch, New Zealand
- Height: 6 ft 1 in (1.86 m)
- Weight: 15 st 4 lb (97 kg)

Playing information
- Position: Stand-off, Scrum-half
Club
Years	Team	Pld	T	G	FG	P
2020–21	North Queensland Cowboys	10	1	0	0	4
2022	New Zealand Warriors	8	2	0	0	8
2023–24	Parramatta Eels	24	3	17	1	47
2025–26	Castleford Tigers	57	10	6	0	52
	Total	99	16	23	1	111
Representative
Years	Team	Pld	T	G	FG	P
2021–23	Māori All Stars	2	0	0	0	0
2023–	Samoa	2	0	0	0	0
- Source: As of 19 November 2026

Daejarn Asi (born 15 August 2000) is a Samoa international rugby league footballer who plays as a scrum-half or stand-off for the Brisbane Tigers in the Queensland Cup.

He has previously played for North Queensland Cowboys, New Zealand Warriors and Parramatta Eels in the NRL. He has also played for New Zealand Māori at representative level.

== Background ==
Born in Christchurch, New Zealand, Asi is of Samoan (Solosolo and Afega), Māori (Ngāi Tahu and Tuhoe) and English descent. He played his junior rugby league for the Aranui Eagles before moving to Australia.

In Australia, he played his junior rugby league for the Nerang Roosters and Ormeau Shearers. Asi attended Keebra Park State High School and later Brisbane Grammar School before being signed by the North Queensland Cowboys.

== Playing career ==
=== Early career ===
In 2016, Asi played for Gold Coast Green in the Cyril Connell Cup. In 2018, he played for the Norths Devils in the Mal Meninga Cup.

In 2019, Asi moved to Townsville, where he played for the Townsville Blackhawks in the Hastings Deering Colts. Later that season, he made his debut for the Blackhawks' Queensland Cup side.

=== 2020 ===
In January, Asi was a member of the Queensland under-20 Emerging Origin squad. In February, he re-signed with the Cowboys on a three-year deal.

In Round 10 of the 2020 NRL season, Asi made his NRL debut, starting at five-eighth and scoring a try against the Penrith Panthers. Asi played five games in his rookie season, missing time due to minor knee injuries.

=== 2021 ===
On 20 February, Asi represented the Māori All Stars, coming off the bench in their 10-all draw with the Indigenous All Stars.

Asi began the 2021 season playing for the Blackhawks before making a mid-season switch to the Mackay Cutters. He returned to first grade in Round 17, starting at fullback in a loss to the 46–18 loss to the South Sydney Rabbitohs.

He played five games for the Cowboys in 2021, starting three at centre.

=== 2022 ===
In 2022, Asi joined the New Zealand Warriors. He played his first game for the Warriors in round 8 of the 2022 NRL season. Asi made a total of eight appearances for the New Zealand club as they finished 15th on the table. On 6 September, he was released by the New Zealand Warriors.

In November, Asi signed a contract to join Parramatta for the 2023 season.

=== 2023 ===
In round 15 of the 2023 NRL season, Asi made his club debut for Parramatta in their 32–12 victory over arch-rivals Canterbury. He played a total of ten matches for Parramatta in the 2023 NRL season as the club finished 10th on the table.

=== 2024 ===
In round 6 of the 2024 NRL season, Asi was called into the Parramatta team for their match against North Queensland. He scored his first try for the Eels and kicked a field goal in the clubs 27–20 victory. Asi made a total of 14 appearances for the club filling in for the injured Mitchell Moses as they finished 15th on the table. On 11 September, it was announced that Asi would be departing the Parramatta club after not being offered a new contract.

In September, Asi was linked with a move to the Castleford Tigers in the Super League, who were looking to replace departing halfback Jacob Miller. On 30 October, Castleford announced Asi would join from 2025 on a two-year contract.

=== 2025 ===
Asi was assigned Castleford's number 6 shirt for the 2025 season. He made his Tigers debut on 9 February 2025 against Bradford Bulls in the Challenge Cup, and scored his first try for the club in round 11 against Salford Red Devils. He made twenty-eight appearances for Castleford, featuring in every match, as the club finished 11th on the table.

=== 2026 ===
Asi scored his first try of the season for Castleford against Toulouse Olympique in round 15, and was named in the Super League team of the week. He scored a try in Castleford's comeback win against Leeds Rhinos in round 19, fending off four defenders to power over the line.

On 9 September, it was confirmed that Asi would depart Castleford at the end of the 2026 season upon the expiry of his contract. He made twenty-nine appearances throughout the season, having been ever-present across both his years at the club.

On 2 November 2026 it was reported that he had joined Queensland Cup side Brisbane Tigers

== Career statistics ==
=== Club ===
Appearances and points in all competitions by year
Club	Season	Tier	App	T	G	DG	Pts
North Queensland Cowboys	2020	NRL	5	1	0	0	4
North Queensland Cowboys	2021	NRL	5	0	0	0	0
North Queensland Cowboys	Total		10	1	0	0	4
New Zealand Warriors	2022	NRL	8	2	0	0	8
Parramatta Eels	2023	NRL	10	0	0	0	0
Parramatta Eels	2024	NRL	14	3	17	1	47
Parramatta Eels	Total		24	3	17	1	47
Castleford Tigers	2025	Super League	28	6	3	0	30
Castleford Tigers	2026	Super League	29	4	3	0	22
Castleford Tigers	Total		57	10	6	0	52
Career total			99	16	23	1	111

As of match played 12 September 2026
