= Blaize Talagi =

Samoa international rugby league footballer

Personal information
- Full name: Blaize Afasene Seuala Talagi
- Born: 16 March 2005 (age 21)
- Height: 188 cm (6 ft 2 in)
- Weight: 90 kg (14 st 2 lb)

Playing information
- Position: Five-eighth, Centre, Wing
Club
Years	Team	Pld	T	G	FG	P
2024	Parramatta Eels	20	11	0	0	44
2025–	Penrith Panthers	43	12	2	0	52
	Total	63	23	2	0	96
Representative
Years	Team	Pld	T	G	FG	P
2024–25	Samoa	5	0	11	0	22
- Source: As of 6 November 2026

Blaize Afasene Seuala Talagi (born 16 March 2005 in Liverpool, NSW, Australia) is an Australian international rugby league footballer who plays as a five-eighth for the Penrith Panthers in the National Rugby League and for Samoa, where his parents were born.

He previously played for the Parramatta Eels in the NRL as a centre, fullback and winger.

== Background ==
He was educated at Westfields Sports High School.

Talagi has played for New South Wales at under-16 and under-18 level. He also played for the Australian Schoolboys side in 2022.

He came through the system at the Parramatta Eels. Talagi won the 2023 SG Ball Grand Final with Parramatta, playing centre.

== Playing career ==
In round 3 of the 2024 NRL season Talagi made his first grade debut for the Parramatta Eels in their 28–24 win against the Manly Warringah Sea Eagles scoring a try. On 31 July 2024, Talagi told Parramatta officials that he would not be signing a contract extension to remain at the club in 2025 and beyond. On 12 August, Penrith officially confirmed that Talagi had signed a three year deal with the club starting in 2025. Talagi played 19 games for Parramatta and scored 11 tries as the club finished 15th on the table. On 10 September 2024, Talagi won Parramatta's rookie of the year award. In round 3 of the 2025 NRL season, Talagi made his club debut for Penrith in their 30-24 loss against Melbourne. In round 10 of the 2025 NRL season, Talagi scored a try and provided four try assists in Penrith's 30-30 draw with North Queensland. In round 22, Talagi scored the winning try for Penrith in golden point extra-time as Penrith defeated the Gold Coast 30-26. Talagi played 22 games for Penrith in the 2025 NRL season as the club finished 7th on the table. Talagi played in Penrith's narrow preliminary final loss against Brisbane. Talagi played 21 games for Penrith in the 2026 NRL season as the club claimed the minor premiership but suffered a shock defeat to Newcastle in the preliminary final.

== Statistics ==
Year	Team	Games	Tries	Points
2024	Parramatta Eels	19	11	44
2025	Penrith Panthers	22	6	24
2026	Penrith Panthers	10	5	20
	Total	52	22	88

Ref:
