= Joey Lussick =

Australian rugby league footballer

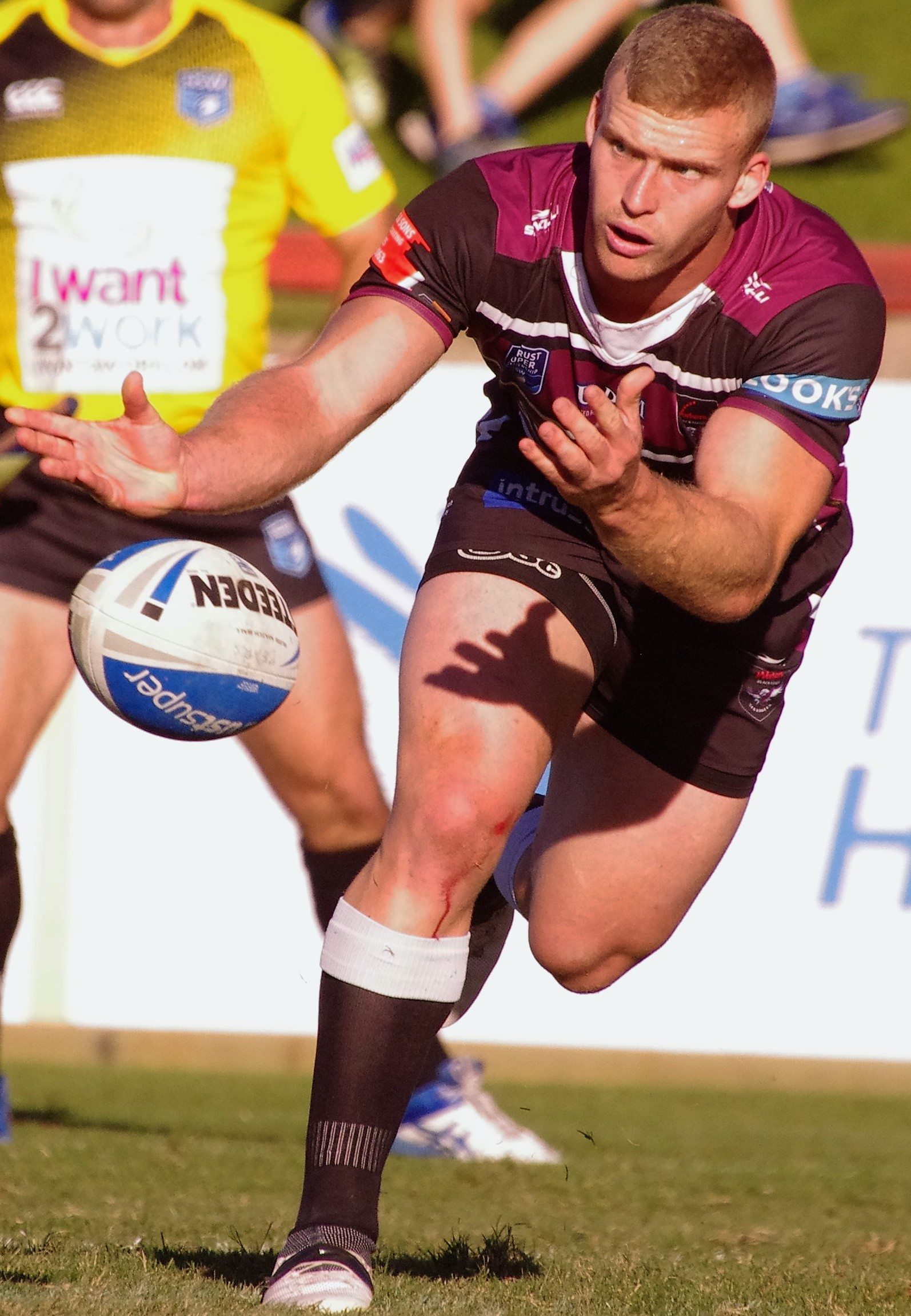

Personal information
- Full name: Joey Lussick
- Born: 28 December 1995 (age 30) Freshwater, New South Wales, Australia
- Height: 178 cm (5 ft 10 in)
- Weight: 93 kg (14 st 9 lb)

Playing information
- Position: Hooker
Club
Years	Team	Pld	T	G	FG	P
2017	Manly Sea Eagles	1	1	0	0	4
2018–20	Salford Red Devils	59	18	4	0	80
2021	Parramatta Eels	9	2	0	0	8
2022–23	St Helens	52	11	8	0	60
2023–25	Parramatta Eels	28	6	0	0	24
	Total	149	38	12	0	176
- Source: As of 28 June 2025
- Relatives: Darcy Lussick (brother); Freddy Lussick (brother)

Joey Lussick (born 28 December 1995) is a former Australian professional rugby league footballer who most recently played as a hooker for the Parramatta Eels in the National Rugby League.

He previously played for the Manly Warringah and the Parramatta Eels in the NRL, and the Salford Red Devils and St Helens in the Super League.

== Background ==
Lussick was born in Freshwater, New South Wales, Australia. He is the younger brother of former Sea Eagles teammate Darcy Lussick the older brother of Freddy Lussick and son of former Sea Eagles player Jason Lussick.

Lussick played his junior rugby league for the Beacon Hill Bears, and rugby union for Newington College and the Australian Schoolboys rugby league and union team before being signed by the Parramatta Eels.

== Playing career ==
=== Early career ===
In late 2013, Lussick played for the Australian Schoolboys. In 2014 and 2015, he played for the Parramatta Eels' NYC team. During 2015, he made a mid-season switch to the Sydney Roosters. In 2016, he graduated to the Roosters' Intrust Super Premiership NSW team, Wyong Roos.

=== 2017 ===
In 2017, Lussick joined Manly. In round 20 of the 2017 NRL season, he made his NRL debut for Manly against the St. George Illawarra Dragons, playing alongside his brother Darcy and scoring a try.

=== 2018 ===
In 2018, Lussick joined English side, the Salford Red Devils for the rest of the season in their aim to remain in the Super League during the Middle 8s. His existing footballing relationship with fellow new Red Devil Jackson Hastings, having played Australian schoolboys as well as at the Roosters and Manly with Hastings, was said to be an added bonus according to Head Coach Ian Watson, as was his adaptability to play anywhere in the spine.

=== 2019 ===
Lussick was part of the Salford side which surprised many by reaching the 2019 Super League Grand Final against St Helens. Salford went into the game looking to win their first championship since 1976 but faced a St Helens team which had only lost 3 games all season. Lussick played in the final which was won by St Helens by a score of 23–6 at Old Trafford.

=== 2020 ===
On 22 October, Lussick signed a one-year deal to join NRL side Parramatta for the 2021 NRL season.

=== 2021 ===
In round 11 of the 2021 NRL season, Lussick made his club debut for Parramatta in their 28-6 loss against Manly-Warringah.

On 16 September, he signed a three-year deal to join English side St Helens RFC. Lussick made a total of nine appearances for Parramatta in the 2021 NRL season. He did not feature in the club's finals campaign. On 22 September, he was officially released by the Parramatta club.

=== 2022 ===
In round 1 of the 2022 Super League season, Lussick made his club debut for St Helens R.F.C. where they defeated Catalans Dragons 28-8. On 24 September, Lussick played from the interchange bench in St Helens 24-12 Grand Final victory over Leeds.

=== 2023 ===
On 18 February 2023, Lussick played in St Helens 13-12 upset victory over Penrith in the 2023 World Club Challenge. Following St Helens Challenge Cup semi-final loss against Leigh, Lussick announced that he would be departing the club with immediate effect after signing with an undisclosed NRL club. On 25 July, it was announced that Lussick had re-joined Parramatta on a three-year deal which would keep him at the club until the end of the 2025 season.

=== 2024 ===
Lussick played 20 matches for Parramatta in the 2024 NRL season as the club finished 15th on the table. Lussick had started out as the clubs first choice hooker at the start of the season but due to indifferent performances was demoted to the interchange bench or the NSW Cup in place of Brendan Hands.

=== 2025 ===
Lussick was limited to only four games with the Parramatta side in the 2025 NRL season after falling down the pecking order because of an elbow injury. In early September, it was announced that Lussick would be departing Parramatta after not being offered a new contract.

=== 2026 ===
On 18 January, Lussick announced his retirement from rugby league.

== Statistics ==
Year	Team	Games	Tries	Goals	Pts
2017	Manly Warringah Sea Eagles	1	1		
2018	Salford Red Devils	7	2		8
2019	Salford Red Devils	34	13	4	64
2020	Salford Red Devils	18	3		12
2021	Parramatta Eels	9	2		8
2022	St. Helens	32	5	1	22
2023	St. Helens	20	6	7	38
2023	Parramatta Eels	5			
2024	Parramatta Eels	20	5		20
2025	Parramatta Eels	2			
	Totals	147	37	12	172
