= Dan Keir =

Australian rugby league footballer

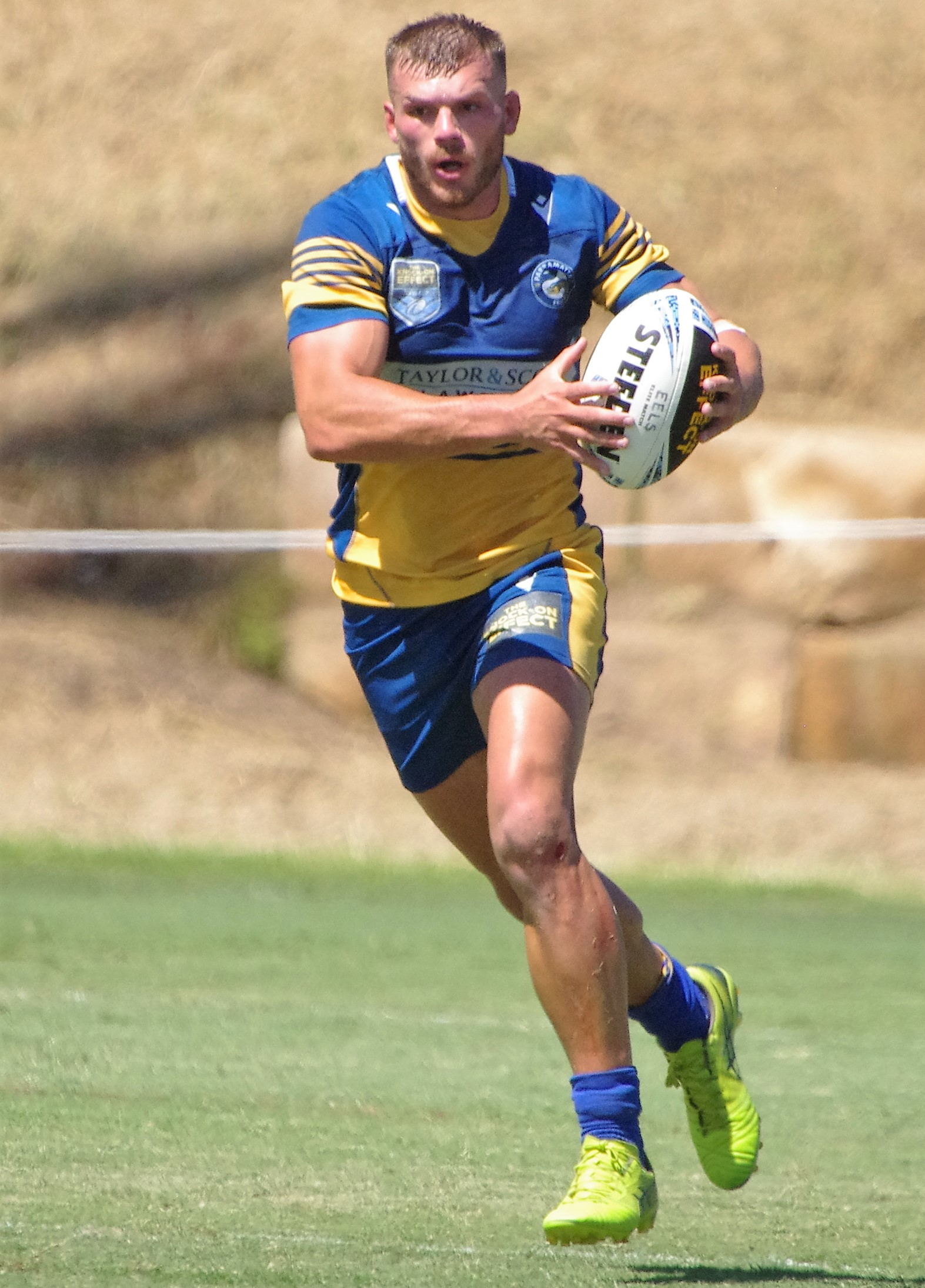

Personal information
- Full name: Daniel Keir
- Born: 12 March 1998 (age 28) Canberra, Australian Capital Territory, Australia
- Height: 185 cm (6 ft 1 in)
- Weight: 102 kg (16 st 1 lb)

Playing information
- Position: Second-row, Lock
Club
Years	Team	Pld	T	G	FG	P
2024–25	Parramatta Eels	7	0	0	0	0
2026–	South Sydney	0	0	0	0	0
	Total	7	0	0	0	0
- Source: As of 30 March 2025

Daniel Keir (born 12 March 1998) is an Australian professional rugby league footballer who most recently played as a lock and second-row forward for the South Sydney Rabbitohs in the National Rugby League and NSW Cup.

== Career ==
Keir is the son of former Canberra Raiders, Sydney Roosters and North Sydney Bears Winger Steve Keir. Keir played junior football for the Gungahlin Bulls. In 2016, he was selected for the Australian Schoolboys team while playing for the Canberra Raiders. Keir played for Mounties, feeder club of Canberra, in NSW Cup in 2019. In 2021, Keir signed with the Parramatta Eels to play NSW Cup. In round 21 2024, Keir made his NRL debut against the Melbourne Storm at Commbank Stadium off the bench. Keir played six games for Parramatta in the 2024 season as the club finished 15th on the table. On 17 October 2024 he resigned with the club until 2025. Keir made one appearance for Parramatta in the 2025 NRL season. He would instead play for Parramatta's NSW Cup team. In early September, it was announced that Keir would be departing Parramatta after not being offered a new contract.
