= Lorenzo Mulitalo =

NZ rugby league footballer

Personal information
- Full name: Lorenzo Mulitalo
- Born: 17 November 1999 (age 26) Auckland, New Zealand

Playing information
- Position: Wing
Club
Years	Team	Pld	T	G	FG	P
2024	Parramatta Eels	1	0	0	0	0
- Source: As of 11 September 2024
- Relatives: Ronaldo Mulitalo (brother)

Lorenzo Mulitalo (born 17 November 1999) is a New Zealand professional rugby league footballer who plays as a winger for the Burleigh Bears in the Queensland Cup.

== Background ==
He is the twin brother of Cronulla Sharks winger Ronaldo Mulitalo.

== Playing career ==
Mulitalo played for Cronulla alongside brother Ronaldo in Jersey Flegg for the 2019 season.

In round 19 of the 2024 NRL season, Mulitalo made his NRL debut for Parramatta against the Gold Coast Titans at Cbus Super Stadium.

On 11 September 2024, it was announced that Mulitalo would be departing the Parramatta club after not being offered a new contract.

Mulitalo signed for the Burleigh Bears in the Queensland Cup for the 2025 season.
