= Toni Mataele =

Australian rugby league footballer

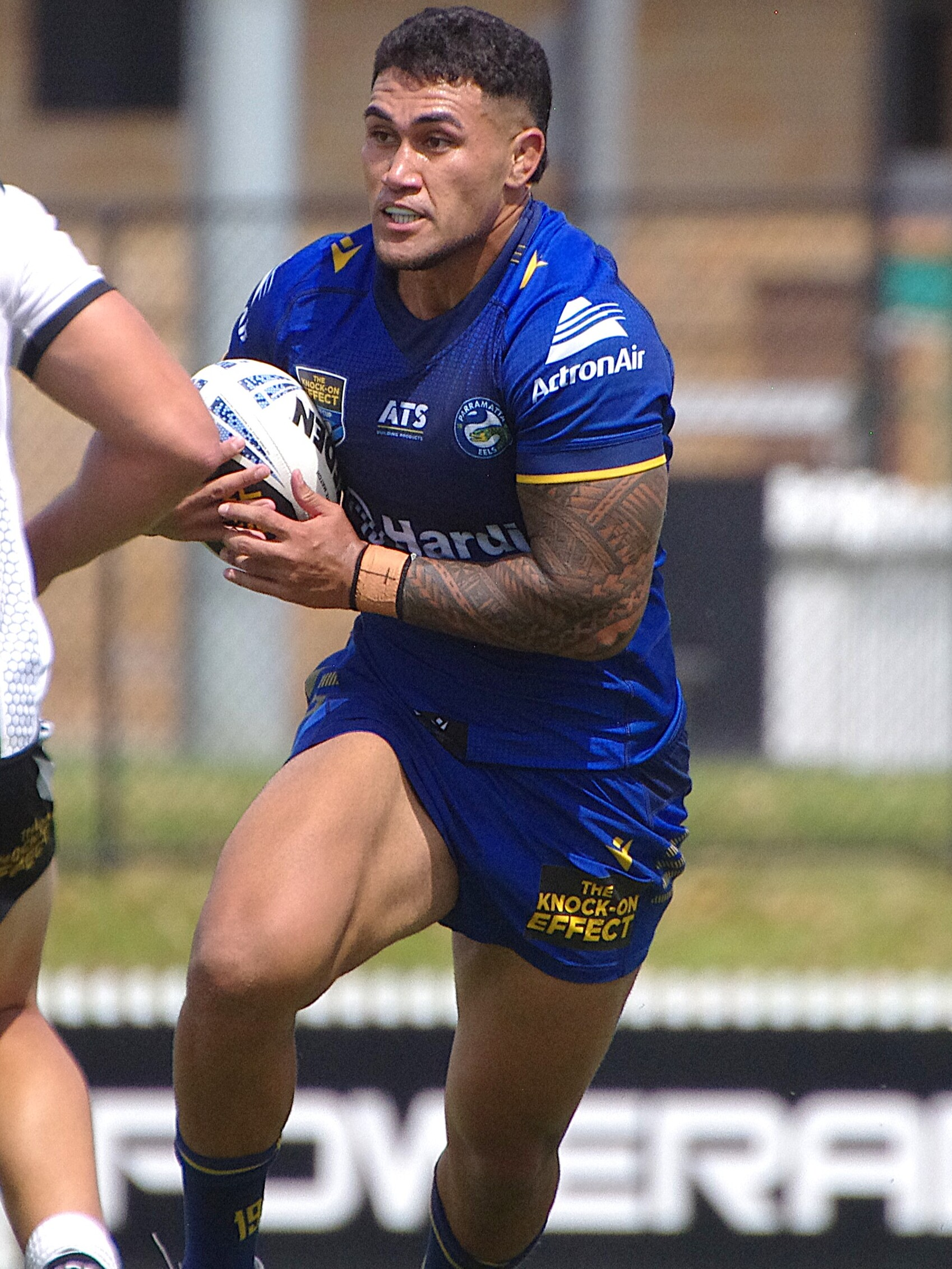

Personal information
- Full name: Uinitoni Mataele
- Born: 12 December 2002 (age 23) Prairiewood, New South Wales, Australia
- Height: 188 cm (6 ft 2 in)
- Weight: 108 kg (17 st 0 lb)

Playing information
- Position: Prop, Second-row
Club
Years	Team	Pld	T	G	FG	P
2025–26	Parramatta Eels	7	0	0	0	0
2027-	Manly Sea Eagles	0	0	0	0	0
	Total	7	0	0	0	0
- Source: As of 5 July 2026

Toni Mataele (born 12 December 2002) is an Australian professional rugby league footballer who plays as a prop forward for the Parramatta Eels in the National Rugby League and NSW Cup.

== Background ==
Mataele attended Patrician Brothers Blacktown, while playing his junior football with the Rouse Hill Rhinos.

== Career ==
Mataele came through the Parramatta pathways before signing with Newcastle in 2019. In 2022, Mataele returned to Parramatta signing til the end of 2025.

In round 11 of the 2025 NRL season, Mataele made his NRL debut for Parramatta against the Newcastle Knights. Coming off the bench in a 28-6 win at McDonald Jones Stadium.

Mataele re-signed with Parramatta until the end of 2026.

On 10 July 2026, Manly announced that Mataele had signed with the club on a two-year deal from 2027.
