= Luca Moretti =

Italy & PNG international rugby league footballer

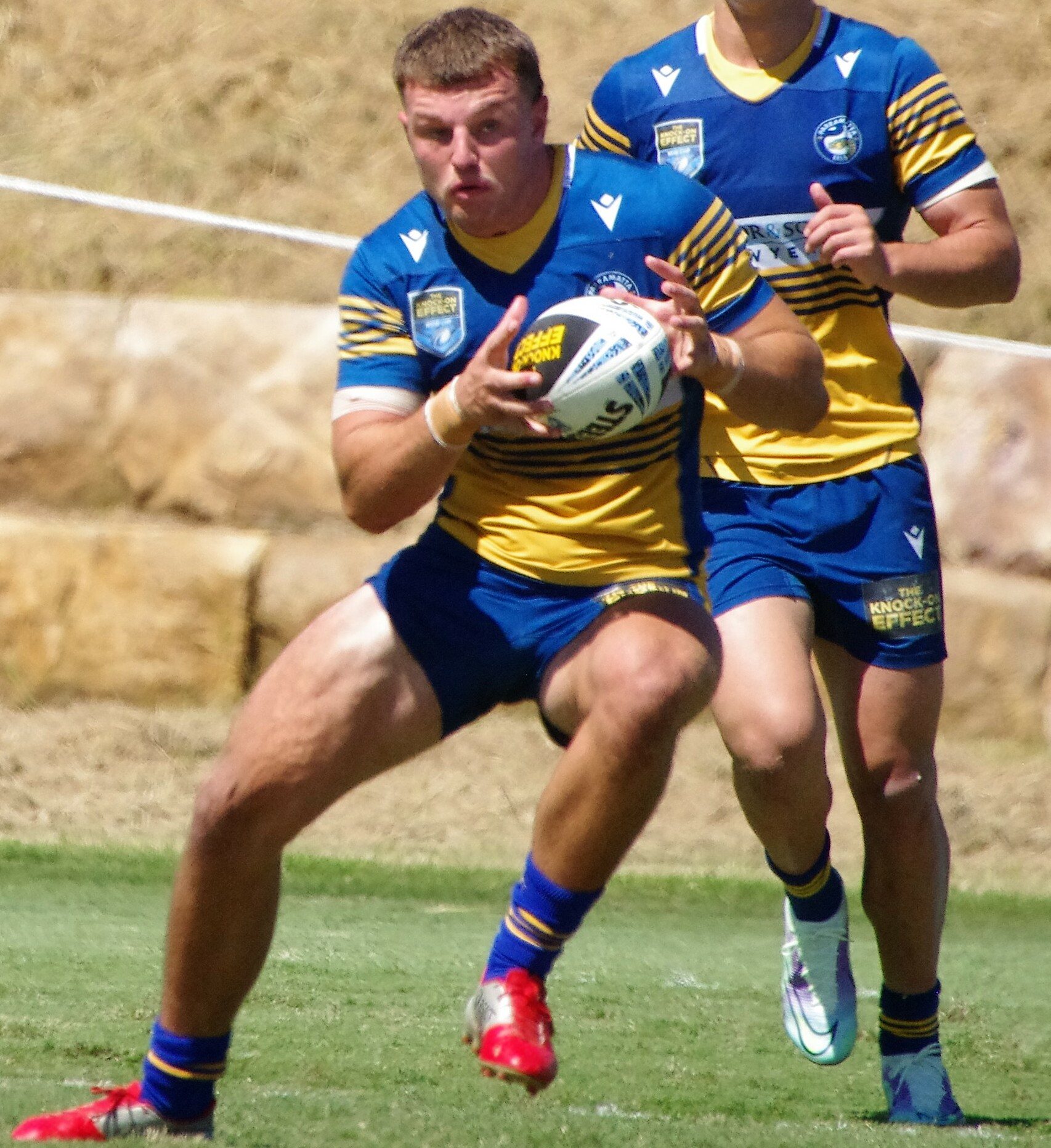

Personal information
- Full name: Luca Moretti
- Born: 20 April 2000 (age 26) Sydney, New South Wales, Australia
- Height: 188 cm (6 ft 2 in)
- Weight: 102 kg (16 st 1 lb)

Playing information
- Position: Lock, Second-row
Club
Years	Team	Pld	T	G	FG	P
2023–	Parramatta Eels	52	3	0	0	12
Representative
Years	Team	Pld	T	G	FG	P
2022	Italy	3	0	0	0	0
2026–	Papua New Guinea	2	0	0	0	0
- Source: As of 9 November 2026

Luca Moretti (born 19 April 2000) is a professional rugby league footballer who plays as a lock or second-row forward for the Parramatta Eels in the National Rugby League and NSW Cup. He has played for both Italy and Papua New Guinea at international level.

== Background ==
Moretti is of Italian descent and attended school at Waverley College where he was a prominent rugby union player. He played his junior rugby league with Clovelly Crocodiles.

== Playing career ==
=== Club career ===
In round 13 of the 2023 NRL season, Moretti made his first grade debut for Parramatta in their 24–16 victory over North Queensland. On 29 August 2023 Moretti was voted Parramatta's NSW Cup player of the season at the Ken Thornett Medal presentation night.

=== 2024 ===
Moretti played 12 games for Parramatta in the 2024 NRL season as the club finished 15th on the table.

=== 2025 ===
On 16 January the Parramatta outfit announced that Moretti had re-signed with the club until the end of the 2027 season. Moretti played 12 games for Parramatta in the 2025 NRL season as the club finished 11th on the table.

=== 2026 ===
Moretti played 18 matches for Parramatta in the 2026 NRL season as the club finished 13th on the table.

=== International career ===
In 2022 Moretti was named in the Italy squad for the 2021 Rugby League World Cup. Moretti made his Italy debut in the opening round of the 2021 Rugby League World Cup against Scotland which Italy won 28-4.

He made his Papua New Guinea international début in the 2026 Rugby League World Cup 42-18 win over Lebanon on 17 October 2026.

== Statistics ==
Year	Team	Games	Tries	Pts
2023	Parramatta Eels	11	1	4
2024	Parramatta Eels	11	1	4
2025	Parramatta Eels	12		
2026	Parramatta Eels	16	1	4
2027	Parramatta Eels			
	Totals	49	3	12
