= Jake Tago =

Samoa international rugby league footballer

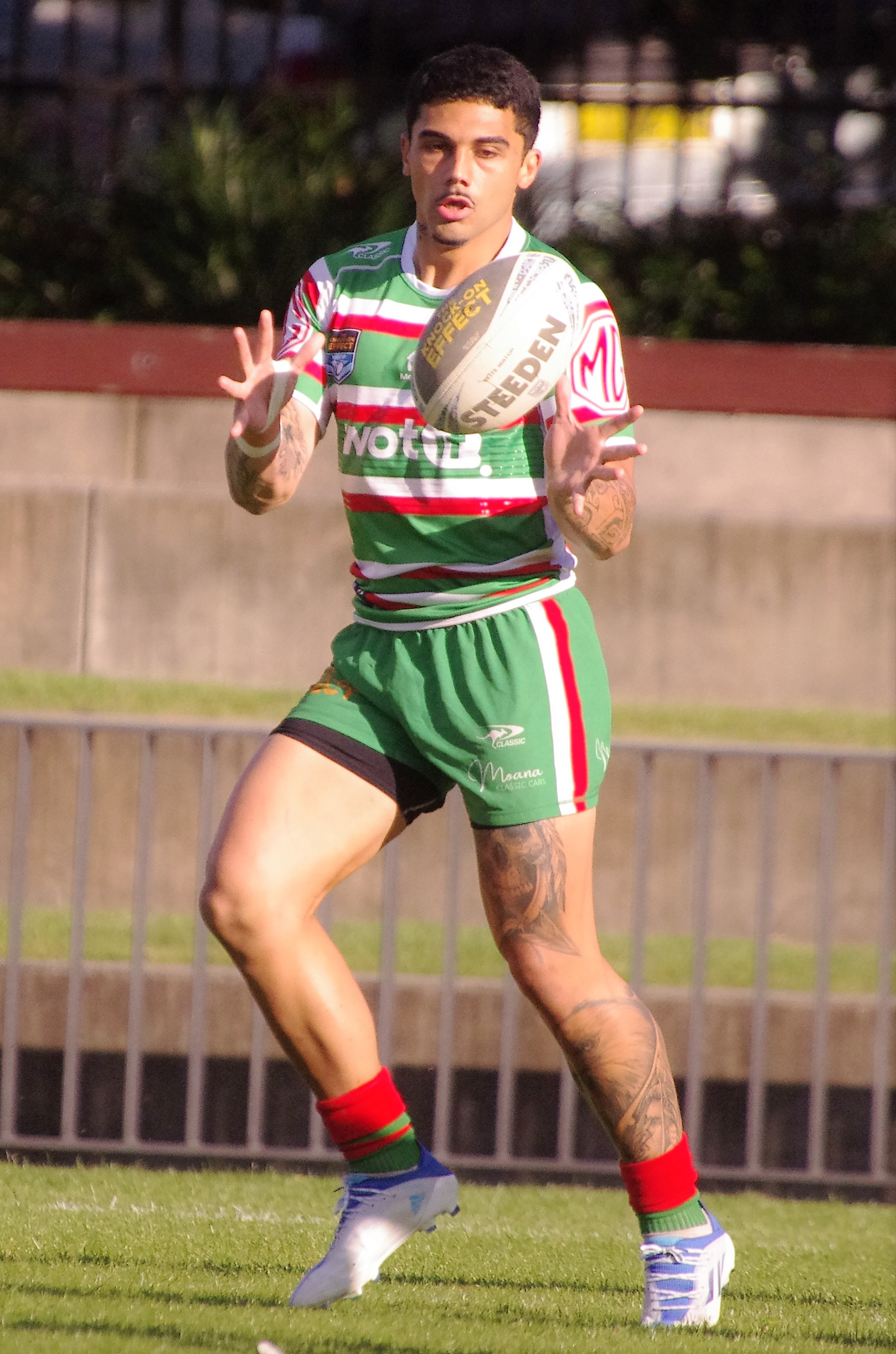

Personal information
- Full name: Jake Tago
- Born: 10 February 1999 (age 27) Sydney, New South Wales, Australia
- Height: 183 cm (6 ft 0 in)
- Weight: 92 kg (14 st 7 lb)

Playing information
- Position: Centre, Wing
Club
Years	Team	Pld	T	G	FG	P
2024–26	Parramatta Eels	9	5	0	0	20
Representative
Years	Team	Pld	T	G	FG	P
2024	Samoa	1	1	0	0	4
- Source: As of 30 August 2026
- Relatives: Izack Tago (brother)

Jake Tago (born 10 February 1999) is a Samoa international rugby league footballer who most recently played as a winger and centre for the Parramatta Eels in the National Rugby League and NSW Cup.

== Background ==
He is the older brother of Penrith Panthers centre Izack Tago. He is of Samoan descent.

== Playing career ==
Tago played for the North Sydney Bears Jersey Flegg team as an affiliation of the South Sydney Rabbitohs in 2018. Tago played for North Sydney's NSW Cup in 2018.

In 2019, Tago move to the Penrith Panthers playing for their NSW Cup team until 2020.

In 2022, Tago signed with South Sydney to play NSW Cup.

In 2024, Tago played for the Wentworthville Magpies in Ron Massey Cup competition, before being promoted to the Parramatta Eels NSW cup team. In round 18 of the 2024 NRL season, Tago made his NRL debut for Parramatta against the South Sydney Rabbitohs at Commbank Stadium on the wing in a 32-16 loss.

Tago re-signed with Parramatta on a two year deal until 2026. Tago played eight games for Parramatta in the 2024 season and scored four tries as the club finished 15th on the table. On 30 August 2026, it was announced that Tago had been released by Parramatta after not being offered a new contract. He made no appearances for the first grade side in 2026. He instead played for their NSW Cup side making eleven appearances.

=== International ===
He scored his first try for Samoa in the 34-16 2nd test defeat to England on 2 November 2024.
