= Ethan Sanders =

Professional rugby league footballer

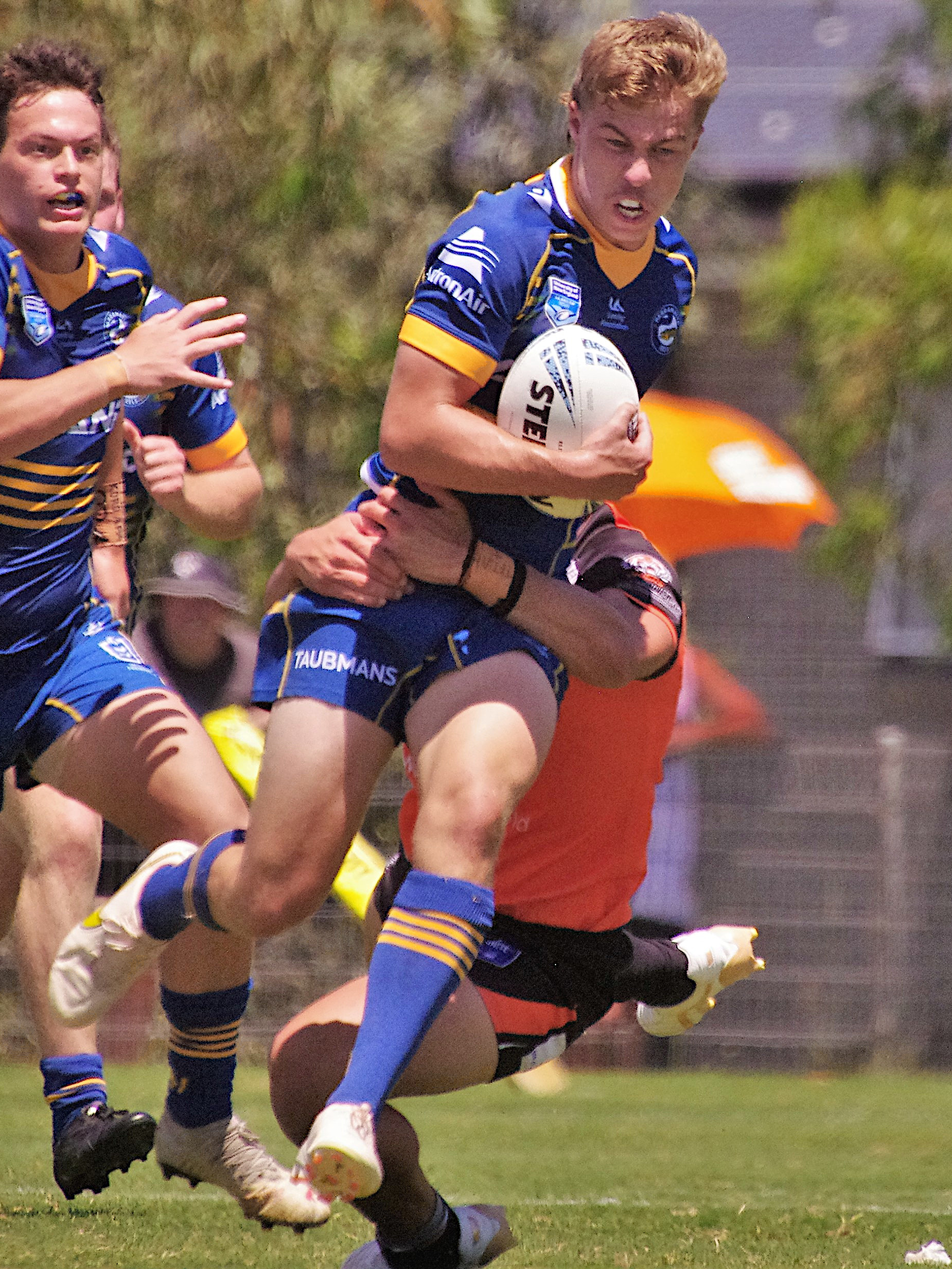

Personal information
- Full name: Ethan Sanders
- Born: 30 January 2004 (age 22) Sydney, New South Wales, Australia
- Height: 185 cm (6 ft 1 in)
- Weight: 91 kg (14 st 5 lb)

Playing information
- Position: Halfback, Five-eighth
Club
Years	Team	Pld	T	G	FG	P
2024	Parramatta Eels	2	0	0	0	0
2025–	Canberra Raiders	25	3	84	1	181
	Total	27	3	84	1	181
- Source: As of 21 August 2026

Ethan Sanders (born 30 January 2004) is an Australian professional rugby league footballer who plays as a halfback for the Canberra Raiders in the National Rugby League.

== Background ==
Sanders has played for New South Wales at under-18 and under-19 level. He played his junior rugby league at Hills District Bulls.

Sanders won the 2023 SG Ball Grand Final with Parramatta, playing at halfback.

== Playing career ==
In round 8 of the 2024 NRL season, Sanders made his first grade debut for the Parramatta Eels in their 32–18 loss against the Manly Warringah Sea Eagles playing at five-eighth. In April 2024, it was announced that Sanders had signed a contract to join the Canberra Raiders ahead of the 2025 NRL season. In round 13 of the 2025 NRL season, Sanders made his club debut for Canberra in their 26-24 victory over the Sydney Roosters. In round 1 of the 2026 NRL season, Sanders kicked the winning field goal for Canberra as they defeated Manly 29-28 in golden point extra-time. Sanders played 23 games for Canberra in the 2026 NRL season as the club finished 11th on the table and missed the finals.

On 15 October 2026, the Raiders announced that Sanders had re-signed with the club until the end of 2028.

== Statistics ==
Year	Team	Games	Tries	Goals	FG	Pts
2024	Parramatta Eels	2				
2025	Canberra Raiders	2		3		6
2026	Canberra Raiders	23	3	81		175
2027	Canberra Raiders					
	Totals	27	3	84	1	181
