= Sean Russell (rugby league) =

Australian rugby league footballer

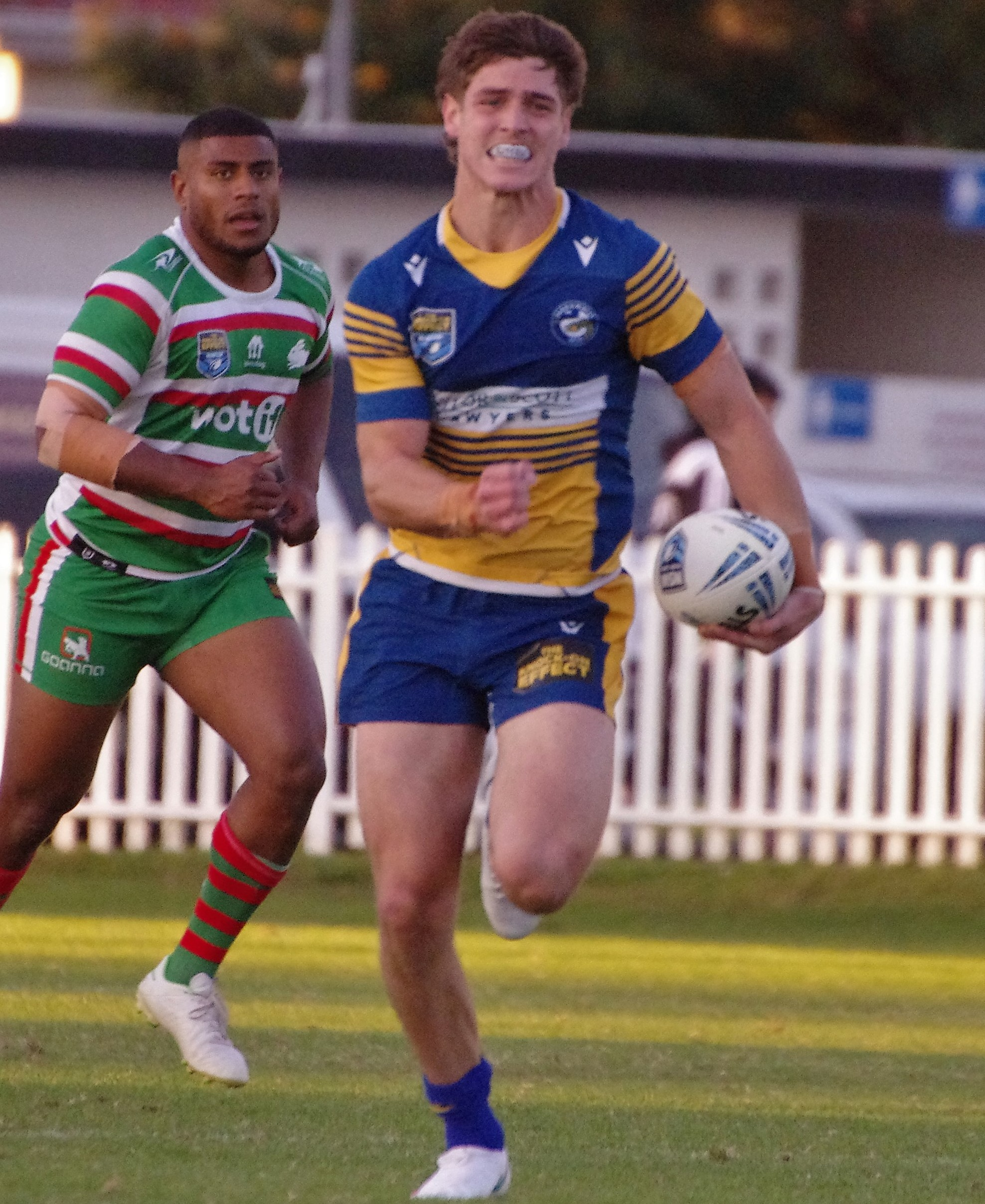

Personal information
- Full name: Sean Russell
- Born: 27 May 2002 (age 24) Windsor, New South Wales, Australia
- Height: 188 cm (6 ft 2 in)
- Weight: 98 kg (15 st 6 lb)

Playing information
- Position: Wing, Centre
Club
Years	Team	Pld	T	G	FG	P
2021–26	Parramatta Eels	79	28	20	0	152
2027–	Perth Bears	0	0	0	0	0
	Total	79	28	20	0	152
Representative
Years	Team	Pld	T	G	FG	P
2024	Prime Minister's XIII	1	0	0	0	0
- Source: As of 6 November 2026

Sean Russell (born 27 May 2002) is an Australian professional rugby league footballer who plays as a winger or centre for the Perth Bears in the National Rugby League.

== Background ==
Russell was born in Windsor, New South Wales, Australia. He is of Finnish descent.

He played his junior rugby league for the Rouse Hill Rhinos. Russell played fullback for Patrician Brothers Blacktown in their NRL Schoolboy final, scoring a try, playing alongside fellow Eels teammates Jakob Arthur and Samuel Loizou.

== Playing career ==
=== 2021 ===
In round 15 of the 2021 NRL season, Russell made his first grade debut for Parramatta against the Canterbury-Bankstown Bulldogs, scoring two tries in a 36–10 victory. In December 2021, Russell signed a new deal to remain at Parramatta until the end of the 2023 season.

=== 2022 ===
In round 1 of the 2022 NRL season, Russell scored a hat-trick in Parramatta's 32–28 victory over the Gold Coast, however suffered fractured ribs and a punctured lung as he scored his third try following an ugly collision with Jayden Campbell. Russell was taken to hospital in the aftermath and later ruled out indefinitely from playing. Parramatta went on to make the Grand Final that year without his involvement. On 7 October, Russell signed a two-year contract extension to remain at Parramatta until the end of 2024.

=== 2023 ===
On 15 March, it was announced that Russell would miss the entire 2023 season after he injured his shoulder during a freak training accident which would require surgery. In round 6 of the 2023 NRL season, Russell who was initially thought to be ruled out for the season, played in the clubs 28–22 victory over the bottom placed Wests Tigers. Russell played a total of 17 matches for Parramatta in the 2023 NRL season as the club finished 10th and missed the finals.

=== 2024 ===
Russell played 21 games for Parramatta in the 2024 NRL season and scored five tries as the club finished 15th on the table. On 27 November, Russell signed a two-year contract extension to remain at Parramatta until the end of 2026.

=== 2025 ===
On 5 August, it was announced that Russell would miss the rest of the 2025 NRL season after suffering a fractured hand in the clubs narrow loss to Melbourne. He played a total of 20 games for Parramatta in the 2025 NRL season as the club finished 11th on the table. In December, Russell signed a four-year deal to join the Perth Bears ahead of the 2027 NRL season.

=== 2026 ===
Russell played 18 games for Parramatta in the 2026 NRL season as the club finished 13th on the table.

== Statistics ==
Year	Team	Games	Tries	Goals	Pts
2021	Parramatta Eels	2	2		8
2022	Parramatta Eels	1	3		12
2023	Parramatta Eels	17	9	1	38
2024	Parramatta Eels	21	5	3	26
2025	Parramatta Eels	20	5	15	50
2026	Parramatta Eels	18	4	1	18
2027	Perth Bears				
	Totals	79	28	20	152
