= Izack Tago =

Samoa international rugby league footballer (born 2002)

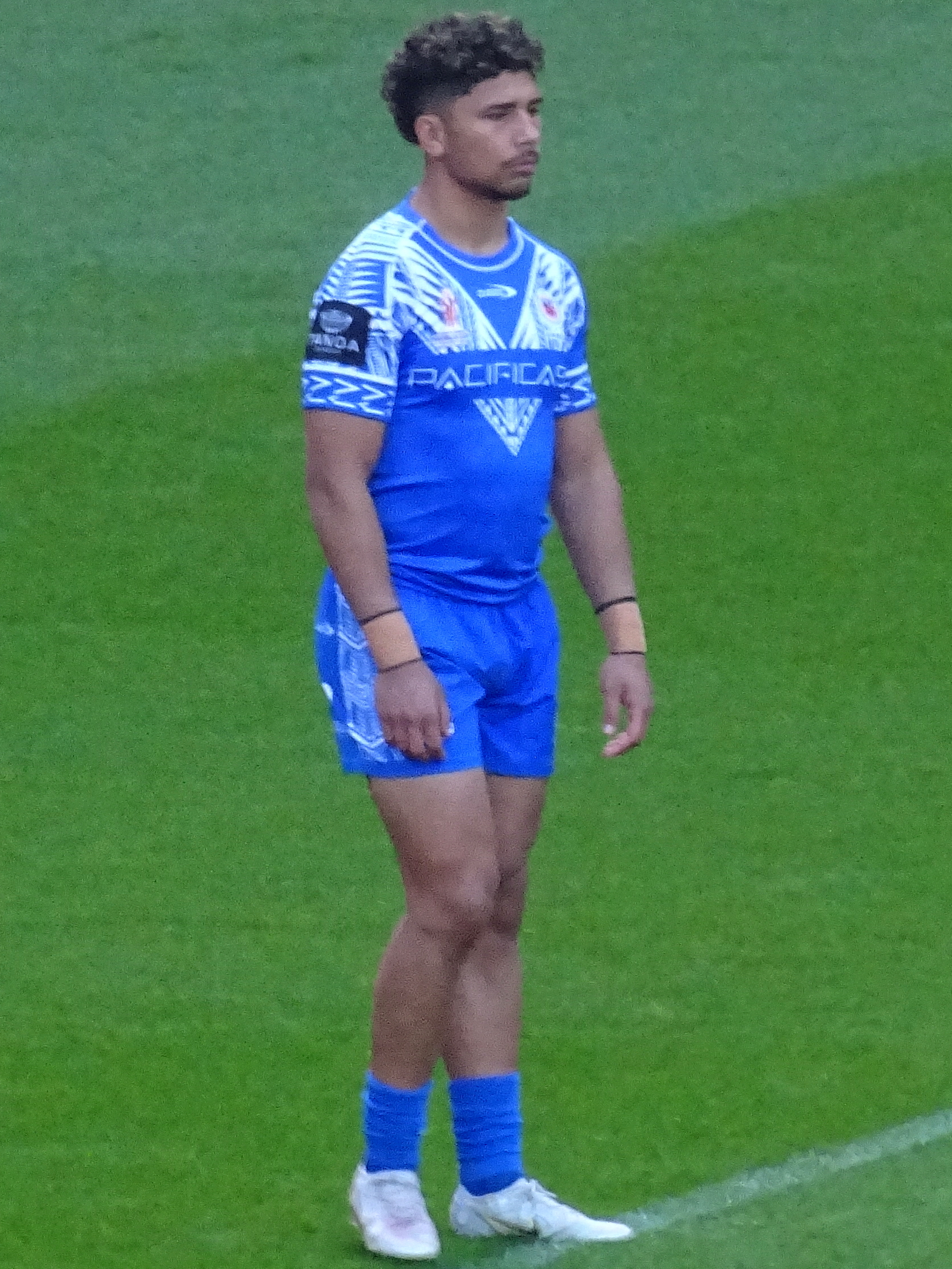

Personal information
- Born: 5 April 2002 (age 24) Sydney, New South Wales, Australia
- Height: 184 cm (6 ft 0 in)
- Weight: 93 kg (14 st 9 lb)

Playing information
- Position: Centre
Club
Years	Team	Pld	T	G	FG	P
2021–	Penrith Panthers	114	44	0	0	176
Representative
Years	Team	Pld	T	G	FG	P
2022–	Samoa	11	6	0	0	24
- Source: As of 17 November 2026
- Relatives: Jake Tago (brother)

Izack Tago (born 5 April 2002) is a Samoa international rugby league footballer who plays as a centre for the Penrith Panthers in the National Rugby League. He won the 2022, 2023 and 2024 NRL Grand Finals with the Penrith Panthers.

== Background ==
Tago played his junior rugby league for the St Mary's Saints. He is of Samoan descent.

== Playing career ==
=== 2021 ===
In round 13 of the 2021 NRL season, Tago made his first grade debut for Penrith against the Wests Tigers at Leichhardt Oval.

=== 2022 ===
In round 1 of the 2022 NRL season, Tago scored the first try of the year in the opening match as Penrith defeated Manly 28-6.

Tago played 26 games for Penrith in the 2022 NRL season including the clubs 2022 NRL Grand Final victory over Parramatta.

In October, Tago was named in the Samoa squad for the 2021 Rugby League World Cup.

=== 2023 ===
On 18 February, Tago played in Penrith's 13-12 upset loss to St Helens RFC in the 2023 World Club Challenge. In round 5 of the 2023 NRL season, Tago scored two tries in Penrith's 53-12 victory over Canberra. Following Penrith's narrow loss to South Sydney in round 8 of the 2023 NRL season, it was announced that Tago would be ruled out for an indefinite period with a pectoral injury. In round 18, Tago made 13 tackle breaks, one try assist and scored two tries against Melbourne at Marvel Stadium in their 34-16 victory. In round 20, Tago scored two tries as Penrith defeated the Dolphins 24-14. Tago played 16 games for Penrith in the 2023 NRL season including the clubs 26-24 victory over Brisbane in the 2023 NRL Grand Final as Penrith won their third straight premiership.

=== 2024 ===
On 24 February, Tago played in Penrith's 2024 World Club Challenge final loss against Wigan. In round 3 of the 2024 NRL season, Tago scored two tries for Penrith in their grand final rematch against Brisbane. Penrith would win the game 34-12. In round 23, Tago scored two tries for Penrith in their 36-34 comeback victory against Parramatta. Tago played a total of 26 games for Penrith in the 2024 NRL season. On 6 October, he played in the 2024 NRL Grand Final with the Penrith side, the fourth consecutive win for the club, with Tago having played in three.

=== 2025 ===
Tago played 25 matches for Penrith in the 2025 NRL season scoring 7 tries as the club finished 7th on the table. Tago played in Penrith's narrow preliminary final loss against Brisbane.

=== 2026 ===
Tago played 16 games for Penrith in the 2026 NRL season. In September, Tago played for Penrith's NSW Cup team in their Grand Final victory over Newtown.

== Statistics ==
.

Year	Team	Games	Tries	Pts
2021	Penrith Panthers	6	1	4
2022	Penrith Panthers	26	13	52
2023	Penrith Panthers	16	10	40
2024	Penrith Panthers	26	10	40
2025	Penrith Panthers	25	7	28
2026	Penrith Panthers	15	3	12
2027	Penrith Panthers			
	Totals	114	44	176
