= Brendan Hands =

Australian rugby league footballer

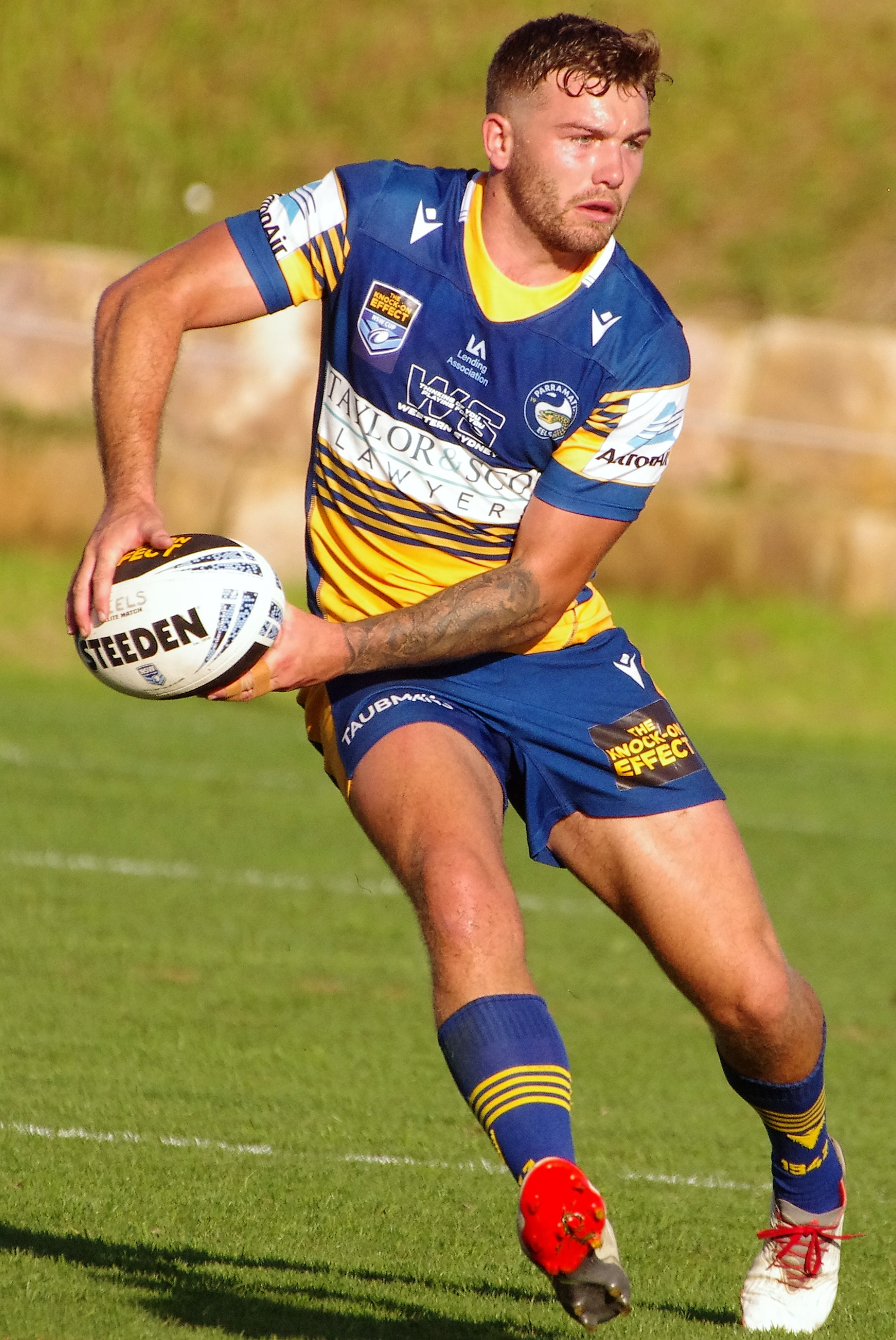

Personal information
- Full name: Brendan Hands
- Born: 12 February 1999 (age 27) Castlereagh, New South Wales, Australia
- Height: 5 ft 9 in (1.76 m)
- Weight: 14 st 7 lb (92 kg)

Playing information
- Position: Hooker
Club
Years	Team	Pld	T	G	FG	P
2023–25	Parramatta Eels	40	2	0	0	8
2025(loan)	→ Toulouse Olympique	8	2	0	0	8
2026–	Toulouse Olympique	25	3	0	0	12
	Total	73	7	0	0	28
- Source: As of 6 November 2026

Brendan Hands (born 12 February 1999) is an Australian professional rugby league footballer who plays as hooker for Toulouse Olympique in the Super League.

== Playing career ==
=== Early career ===
Hands was a Brothers Penrith junior who played both rugby league and basketball. From a young age his coaches said that he would be a NRL player.

He would join the Penrith Panthers playing for their Jersey Flegg Cup under 20's team in 2019, winning the club's Junior Education Award. In 2020, he was a part of Penrith's first grade squad.

=== Parramatta Eels ===
In 2022, Hands signed with the Parramatta Eels to play in the NSW Cup competition. Hands played 23 games for Parramatta's NSW Cup team in 2022.

In round 4 of the 2023 NRL season, Hands made his NRL debut for Parramatta against his former club, Penrith at Western Sydney Stadium and scored a try in his side's 17−16 golden point extra-time victory.

Hands played a total of 19 matches for Parramatta in the 2023 NRL season as the club finished 10th and missed the finals. After Parramatta's upset loss to the Wests Tigers in round 4 of the 2024 NRL season, Hands was demoted to reserve grade by Parramatta head coach Brad Arthur.

Hands played 19 games for Parramatta in the 2024 NRL season as the club finished 15th on the table. On 27 November 2024, Hands signed a two-year contract extension to remain at Parramatta until the end of 2026.

=== Toulouse Olympique (loan) ===
On 30 July 2025, it was announced that Hands had signed with RFL Championship side Toulouse Olympique for the remainder of the 2025 season on loan. On 5 October 2025, Hands played in Toulouse Olympique's RFL Championship grand final victory over York.

On 22 October 2025, the Eels announced that Hands' loan deal with Toulouse would become permanent after Toulouse was promoted into the Super League.
