= Samuel Loizou =

Australian rugby league footballer

Sam Loizou
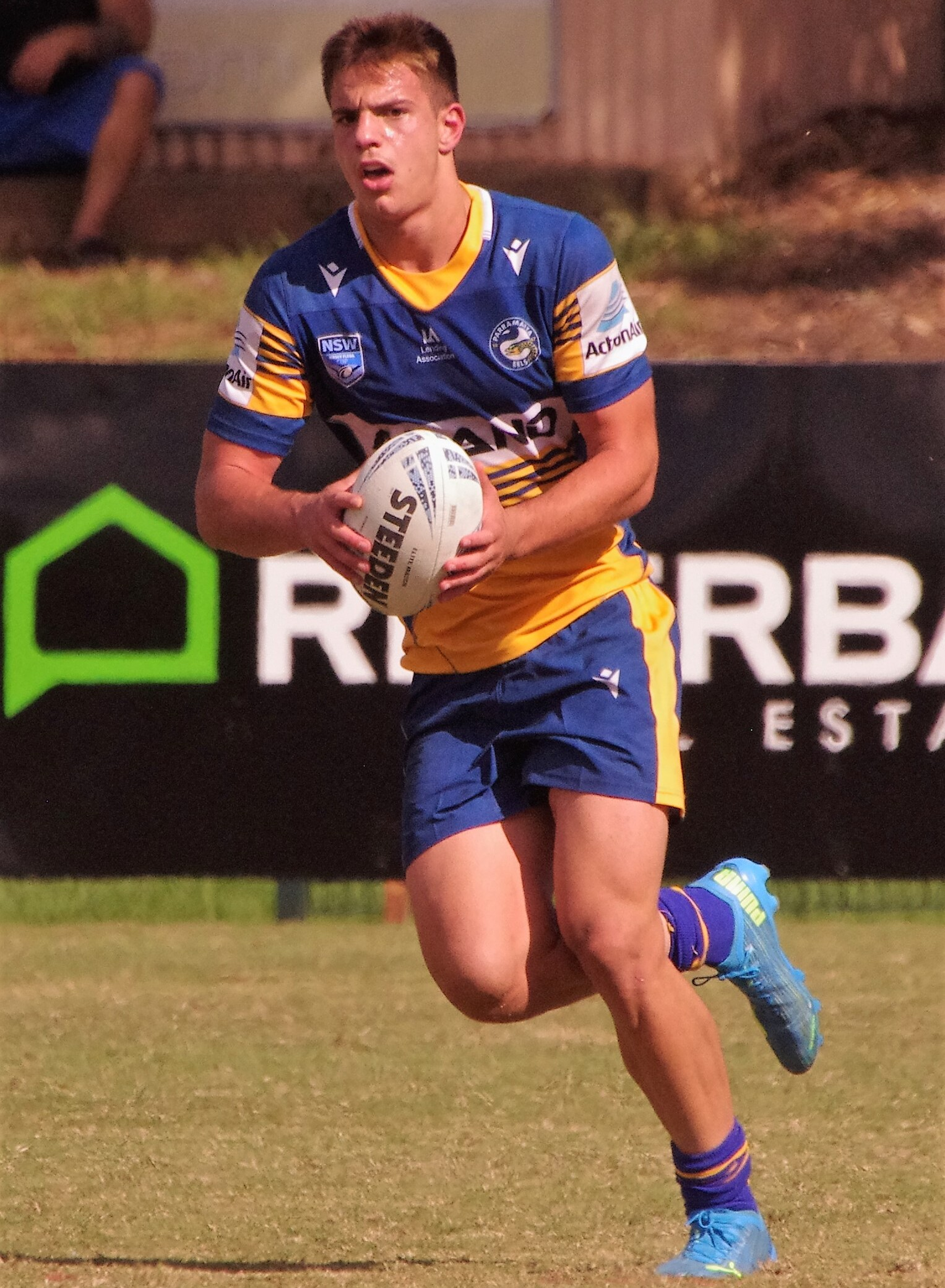

Personal information
- Full name: Samuel Loizou
- Born: 25 December 2002 (age 23) Beaumont Hills, New South Wales, Australia
- Height: 188 cm (6 ft 2 in)
- Weight: 96 kg (212 lb; 15 st 2 lb)

Playing information
- Position: Centre, Wing
Club
Years	Team	Pld	T	G	FG	P
2021	Parramatta Eels	1	0	0	0	0
2026–	Manly Sea Eagles	0	0	0	0	0
	Total	1	0	0	0	0
- Source: As of 15 September 2026

Samuel Loizou (/lɔɪzuː/) (born 25 December 2002) is an Australian professional rugby league footballer who plays as a Centre or Winger for the Manly Warringah Sea Eagles in the National Rugby League & NSW Cup.

== Playing career ==
Loizou is of Greek Cypriot heritage.

In 2019, Loizou represented the Australian Schoolboys being the youngest player in the squad. Loizou was also a part of Parramatta's SG Ball team at 16 years of age winning their best and fairest award in 2019.

In 2021, Loizou started training with Parramatta's first grade squad, playing for their Jersey Flegg team and appearing in two games for NSW Cup. In round 25 2021, Loizou made his NRL debut for Parramatta off the bench against the Penrith Panthers at Cbus Super Stadium in a 6–40 loss. Loizou made no appearances for Parramatta in either the 2022 NRL season or the 2023 NRL season. He would instead continue to play for the clubs NSW Cup team. On 31 October 2023, Loizou was released by Parramatta after not being offered a new contract. On 21 November 2023, it was announced by the Wests Tigers that they had offered Loizou a train and trial deal ahead of the 2024 NRL season. After signing a contract with the Wests Tigers, Loizou decided to U-turn and returned to the Parramatta team his Junior club ahead of the 2024 NRL season.

=== 2026 ===
In 2026, Loizou signed on with the Manly Warringah Sea Eagles for the remainder of the 2026 season. Loizou started the year with Parramatta before the mid-season switch. He made no first grade appearances for either club.
