= 2026 St. George Illawarra Dragons season =

- NRL Rank: 17th
- Play-off result: DNQ
- 2026 record: Wins: 5; losses: 21
- Points scored: For: 392; against: 717

Team information
- CEO: Tim Watsford
- Coach: Shane Flanagan (until round 7); Dean Young (after round 7)
- Captain: Damien Cook & Clinton Gutherson
- Stadium: WIN Stadium (Capacity: 23,750); St George Venues Jubilee Stadium (Capacity: 20,500)
- Avg. attendance: 13,737
- High attendance: 40,381 (Round 8 – Sydney Roosters)

Top scorers
- Tries: Tyrell Sloan (12)
- Points: Valentine Holmes (148)
← 2025	List of seasons	2027 →

The 2026 St. George Illawarra Dragons season was the 28th season in the club's history. They competed in the National Rugby League.

Damien Cook and Clinton Gutherson were co-captains for a second season, whilst head coach Shane Flanagan started his third season in the position, before being sacked and replaced by Dean Young.

== Squad information ==
St. George Illawarra Dragons 2026 squad
Top 30 squad - 2026 NRL season			Supplementary list	Coaching staff
Daniel Atkinson – HB, FE; Hayden Buchanan – CE; Damien Cook (c) – HK; Ryan Couchman – SR; Toby Couchman – PR; Dylan Egan – SR; David Fale – WG; Mat Feagai – CE; Kyle Flanagan – FE, HB; Emre Guler – PR	Clint Gutherson (c) – FB; Jacob Halangahu – SR; Valentine Holmes – CE; Josh Kerr – PR; Lyhkan King-Togia – FE; Blake Lawrie – PR; Nathan Lawson – WG; Luciano Leilua – SR; Jacob Liddle – HK; Loko Pasifiki Tonga – PR	Hame Sele – LK; Tyrell Sloan – FB; Hamish Stewart – LK; Jaydn Su'A – SR; Moses Suli – CE; Nick Tsougranis – SR, CE; Christian Tuipulotu – WG; Leeroy Weatherall – SR	Joseph O'Neill – HB, FE; Kade Reed – HB; Cyrus Stanley-Traill – PR; Setu Tu – WG; Extended squad: Isaiah Fagalilo – HK; Ryan Hutchinson – PR; Tyler Peckham-Harri – FB; Jacob Webster – PR	Head coach: Dean Young (Interim); Managers: Daniel Anderson (Head of Recruitment & Pathways); Legend: (c) Captain(s); (vc) Vice-captain(s); Updated: 29 October 2026; Source(s): Dragons team profiles

== Squad changes ==
=== Transfers in ===
Player	2025 Club	2026 Club	Source
Daniel Atkinson	Cronulla-Sutherland Sharks	St. George Illawarra Dragons	
David Fale	Penrith Panthers	St. George Illawarra Dragons	
Josh Kerr	Dolphins	St. George Illawarra Dragons	
Setu Tu	New Zealand Warriors (NSW Cup)	St. George Illawarra Dragons	

=== Transfers out ===
Player	2025 Club	2026 Club	Source
Corey Allan	St. George Illawarra Dragons	Retirement	
Jack de Belin	St. George Illawarra Dragons	Parramatta Eels	
Tom Eisenhuth	St. George Illawarra Dragons	Retirement	
Raymond Faitala-Mariner	St. George Illawarra Dragons	Unattached	
Viliami Fifita	St. George Illawarra Dragons	Manly Warringah Sea Eagles (NSW Cup)	
Lachlan Ilias	St. George Illawarra Dragons	Gold Coast Titans	
David Klemmer	St. George Illawarra Dragons	St Helens (Super League)	
Michael Molo	St. George Illawarra Dragons	Ipswich Jets (Queensland Cup)	
Ben Murdoch-Masila	St. George Illawarra Dragons	Retirement	
Cody Ramsey	St. George Illawarra Dragons	Sydney Roosters	
Mikaele Ravalawa	St. George Illawarra Dragons	Castleford Tigers (Super League)	
Sione Finau	St. George Illawarra Dragons	Canberra Raiders	

== Ladder ==
Pos	Team	Pld	W	D	L	B	PF	PA	PD	Pts	Qualification
1	Penrith Panthers	24	18	0	6	3	683	347	+336	42	Advance to finals series
2	New Zealand Warriors	24	18	0	6	3	728	418	+310	42	Advance to finals series
3	Dolphins	24	17	0	7	3	662	506	+156	40	Advance to finals series
4	Sydney Roosters (P)	24	16	0	8	3	619	501	+118	38	Advance to finals series
5	Cronulla-Sutherland Sharks	24	14	0	10	3	672	523	+149	34	Advance to finals series
6	South Sydney Rabbitohs	24	14	0	10	3	694	581	+113	34	Advance to finals series
7	Newcastle Knights	24	14	0	10	3	633	591	+42	34	Advance to finals series
8	North Queensland Cowboys	24	13	0	11	3	568	652	−84	32	Advance to finals series
9	Manly Warringah Sea Eagles	24	11	0	13	3	623	524	+99	28	
10	Melbourne Storm	24	11	0	13	3	594	576	+18	28	
11	Canberra Raiders	24	11	0	13	3	581	626	−45	28	
12	Canterbury-Bankstown Bulldogs	24	11	0	13	3	476	536	−60	28	
13	Parramatta Eels	24	9	0	15	3	497	678	−181	24	
14	Brisbane Broncos	24	8	0	16	3	471	677	−206	22	
15	Wests Tigers	24	8	0	16	3	445	699	−254	22	
16	Gold Coast Titans	24	6	0	18	3	477	663	−186	18	
17	St. George Illawarra Dragons	24	5	0	19	3	392	717	−325	16	

Source: National Rugby League
Rules for classification: 1) competition points; 2) points differential; 3) percentage; (Note: Greater percentage of points scored for and against, being determined by points scored for divided by points scored against expressed as a percentage.) 4) tries scored; (Note: Further tiebreakers (in order) include goals scored, field goals kicked; least amount of penalties conceded.)
(P) Premiers

== Season results ==
=== Pre-Season Challenge ===
Date	Round	Opponent	Venue	Score	Tries	Goals	Attendance
Saturday, 7 February	Trial 1	Newcastle Knights	St George Venues Jubilee Stadium	28 – 18	Kade Reed 12'; Setu Tu 23'; Josh Kerr 49'; Mathew Feagai 69'; Hayden Buchanan 75'; Tyrell Sloan 77'	Kade Reed (2/6)	3,926
Saturday, 14 February	Trial 2 (Charity Shield)	South Sydney Rabbitohs	WIN Stadium	24 – 28	Clinton Gutherson 8'; Damien Cook 22'; Luciano Leilua 51'; Mathew Feagai 76'	Kyle Flanagan (4/4)	7,022

=== NRL season ===
Date	Round	Opponent	Venue	Score	Tries	Goals	Attendance
Saturday, 28 February	1 (Vegas)	Canterbury-Bankstown Bulldogs	Allegiant Stadium	15 – 14	Emre Guler 14'; Setu Tu 58'	Valentine Holmes (1/2); PG: Valentine Holmes (1/1); Kyle Flanagan (1/1)	45,719
Saturday, 14 March	2	Melbourne Storm	WIN Stadium	20 – 46	Christian Tuipulotu 19'; Valentine Holmes 28', 50'; Clinton Gutherson 35'	Valentine Holmes (2/4)	11,511
Sunday, 22 March	3	Parramatta Eels	Commbank Stadium	30 – 20	Luciano Leilua 12'; Jaydn Su'A 23'; Moses Suli 56'	Valentine Holmes (3/3)	25,573
Saturday, 29 March	4	Gold Coast Titans	Cbus Super Stadium	22 – 14	Tyrell Sloan 3'; Damien Cook 25'	Valentine Holmes (2/2); PG: Valentine Holmes (1/1)	12,241
Saturday, 4 April	5	North Queensland Cowboys	St George Venues Jubilee Stadium	0 – 32			8,491
Friday, 10 April	6	Manly Sea Eagles	WIN Stadium	18 – 28	Luciano Leilua 30'; Jacob Liddle 35'; Setu Tu 44'	Valentine Holmes (3/3)	11,381
Saturday, 18 April	7	South Sydney Rabbitohs	Accor Stadium	30 – 12	Damien Cook 20'; Hamish Stewart 27'	Valentine Holmes (2/2)	15,115
Saturday, 25 April	8 (Anzac Day Cup)	Sydney Roosters	Allianz Stadium	16 – 62	Setu Tu 24'; Tyrell Sloan 55'; Moses Suli 66'	Valentine Holmes (2/3)	40,381
	9	BYE					
Saturday, 9 May	10	Newcastle Knights	WIN Stadium	10 – 44	Hamish Stewart 43'; Setu Tu 64'	Valentine Holmes (1/2)	10,916
Sunday, 17 May	11 (Magic Round)	Penrith Panthers	Suncorp Stadium	28 – 6	Christian Tuipulotu 59'	Valentine Holmes (1/1)	46,752
Saturday, 23 May	12	New Zealand Warriors	St George Venues Jubilee Stadium	12 – 30	Setu Tu 5'; Christian Tuipulotu 64'	Valentine Holmes (2/2)	8,741
Sunday, 31 May	13	Brisbane Broncos	Suncorp Stadium	26 – 30	Valentine Holmes 5'; Daniel Atkinson 9'; Mathew Feagai 55'; Valentine Holmes 58'; Setu Tu 60'	Valentine Holmes (4/5); PG: Valentine Holmes (1/1)	42,275
Sunday, 7 June	14	Cronulla-Sutherland Sharks	Ocean Protect Stadium	34 – 12	Valentine Holmes 26'; Mathew Feagai 37'	Valentine Holmes (1/2); PG: Valentine Holmes (1/1)	14,989
	15	BYE					
Friday, 19 June	16	Newcastle Knights	McDonald Jones Stadium	22 – 20	Valentine Holmes 24'; Tyrell Sloan 32'; Setu Tu 60'; Dylan Egan 70'	Kyle Flanagan (2/4)	19,092
Saturday, 28 June	17	Canberra Raiders	GIO Stadium	24 – 16	Tyrell Sloan 8', 70'; Setu Tu 30'	Valentine Holmes (2/3)	12,513
Saturday, 4 July	18	Wests Tigers	St George Venues Jubilee Stadium	24 – 10	Tyrell Sloan 19'; Valentine Holmes 68', 71'; Mathew Feagai 76'	Valentine Holmes (3/4)	12,431
	19	BYE					
Saturday, 18 July	20	New Zealand Warriors	Go Media Stadium	20 – 12	Clinton Gutherson 13'; Hamish Stewart 35'	Valentine Holmes (2/2)	23,895
Sunday, 26 July	21	Gold Coast Titans	St George Venues Jubilee Stadium	18 – 38	Tyrell Sloan 6'; Kyle Flanagan 32'; Jacob Liddle 68'	Valentine Holmes (3/3)	9,031
Friday, 31 July	22	Dolphins	WIN Stadium	22 – 28	Setu Tu 11'; Tyrell Sloan 20'; Clinton Gutherson 61'; Ryan Couchman 77'	Valentine Holmes (3/4)	9,218
Sunday, 9 August	23	Cronulla-Sutherland Sharks	St George Venues Jubilee Stadium	24 – 16	Valentine Holmes 13'; Hamish Stewart 24'; Tyrell Sloan 44'; Setu Tu 76'	Valentine Holmes (3/4); PG: Valentine Holmes (1/1)	11,018
Sunday, 16 August	24	Wests Tigers	Commbank Stadium	22 – 24	Tyrell Sloan 21'; Hamish Stewart 31'; Moses Suli 37'; Lyhkan King-Togia 58'	Kyle Flanagan (1/1); Valentine Holmes (3/3)	9,773
Saturday, 22 August	25	Canterbury-Bankstown Bulldogs	Allianz Stadium	14 – 44	Valentine Holmes 47'; Mathew Feagai 63', 68'	Valentine Holmes (1/3)	14,711
Friday, 28 August	26	Manly Warringah Sea Eagles	4 Pines Park	44 – 10	Tyrell Sloan 68'; Moses Suli 76'	Valentine Holmes (1/2)	13,597
Sunday, 6 September	27	Parramatta Eels	WIN Stadium	24 – 22	Tyrell Sloan 14'; Dylan Egan 26'; Blake Lawrie 56'; Connor Muhleisen 66'	Kyle Flanagan (3/4)	17,013
