= 2027 St. George Illawarra Dragons season =

Team information
- CEO: Tim Watsford
- Coach: Dean Young
- Captain: Clinton Gutherson
- Stadium: WIN Stadium (Capacity: 23,750); St George Venues Jubilee Stadium (Capacity: 20,500)
← 2026	List of seasons	2028 →

The 2027 St. George Illawarra Dragons season will be the 29th season in the club's history. They will compete in the National Rugby League.

Clinton Gutherson will be captain for a third season, and first solo, whilst head coach Dean Young will be commencing his first year in the role.

== Squad changes ==
=== Transfers in ===
Player	2026 Club	2027 Club	Source
Scott Drinkwater	North Queensland Cowboys	St. George Illawarra Dragons	
Keaon Koloamatangi	South Sydney Rabbitohs	St. George Illawarra Dragons	
Luke Metcalf	New Zealand Warriors	St. George Illawarra Dragons	
Kodi Nikorima	Dolphins	St. George Illawarra Dragons	
Phillip Sami	Gold Coast Titans	St. George Illawarra Dragons	
Connor Watson	Sydney Roosters	St. George Illawarra Dragons	

=== Transfers out ===
Player	2026 Club	2027 Club	Source
Damien Cook	St. George Illawarra Dragons	Castleford Tigers (Super League)	
Mat Feagai	St. George Illawarra Dragons	Castleford Tigers (Super League)	
Blake Lawrie	St. George Illawarra Dragons	York Knights (Super League)	
Luciano Leilua	St. George Illawarra Dragons	Catalans Dragons (Super League)	
Hame Sele	St. George Illawarra Dragons	Catalans Dragons (Super League)	
Tyrell Sloan	St. George Illawarra Dragons	Castleford Tigers (Super League)	
Jaydn Su'A	St. George Illawarra Dragons	Parramatta Eels	
Christian Tuipulotu	St. George Illawarra Dragons	St Helens (Super League)	

== Ladder ==
Pos	Team	Pld	W	D	L	B	PF	PA	PD	Pts	Qualification
1	Brisbane Broncos	0	0	0	0	0	0	0	0	0	Advance to finals series
2	Canberra Raiders	0	0	0	0	0	0	0	0	0	Advance to finals series
3	Canterbury-Bankstown Bulldogs	0	0	0	0	0	0	0	0	0	Advance to finals series
4	Cronulla-Sutherland Sharks	0	0	0	0	0	0	0	0	0	Advance to finals series
5	Dolphins	0	0	0	0	0	0	0	0	0	Advance to finals series
6	Gold Coast Titans	0	0	0	0	0	0	0	0	0	Advance to finals series
7	Manly Warringah Sea Eagles	0	0	0	0	0	0	0	0	0	Advance to finals series
8	Melbourne Storm	0	0	0	0	0	0	0	0	0	Advance to finals series
9	Newcastle Knights	0	0	0	0	0	0	0	0	0	
10	New Zealand Warriors	0	0	0	0	0	0	0	0	0	
11	North Queensland Cowboys	0	0	0	0	0	0	0	0	0	
12	Parramatta Eels	0	0	0	0	0	0	0	0	0	
13	Penrith Panthers	0	0	0	0	0	0	0	0	0	
14	Perth Bears	0	0	0	0	0	0	0	0	0	
15	South Sydney Rabbitohs	0	0	0	0	0	0	0	0	0	
16	St. George Illawarra Dragons	0	0	0	0	0	0	0	0	0	
17	Sydney Roosters	0	0	0	0	0	0	0	0	0	
18	Wests Tigers	0	0	0	0	0	0	0	0	0	

Updated to match(es) played on unknown. Source: National Rugby League

== Season results ==
=== Pre-Season Challenge ===
Date	Round	Opponent	Venue	Score	Tries	Goals	Attendance
	1			–			
	2			–			

=== NRL season ===
Date	Round	Opponent	Venue	Score	Tries	Goals	Attendance
Friday 5 March	1	North Queensland Cowboys	St George Venues Jubilee Stadium	–			
	2			–			
	3			–			
	4			–			
	5			–			
	6			–			
	7			–			
Sunday 25 April	8 (Anzac Day)	Sydney Roosters	Allianz Stadium	–			
	9			–			
	10			–			
Sunday 16 May	11 (Magic Round)	New Zealand Warriors	Suncorp Stadium	–			
	12			–			
	13			–			
	14			–			
Sunday 14 June	15	New Zealand Warriors	Eden Park	–			
	16			–			
	17			–			
	18			–			
	19			–			
	20			–			
	21			–			
	22			–			
	23			–			
	24			–			
	25			–			
	26			–			
	27			–			
