= Heritage Round =

Heritage Round may refer to:

- AFL Heritage Round, of the Australian Football League (2003-2008)
- NRL Heritage Round, of the National Rugby League (2008-2009)
