= Kade Reed =

Australian rugby league footballer (born 2006)

Personal information
- Born: 20 March 2006 (age 20) Wollongong, New South Wales, Australia
- Weight: 80 kg (12 st 8 lb)

Playing information
- Position: Halfback
Club
Years	Team	Pld	T	G	FG	P
2026–	St. George Illawarra	2	0	0	0	0
- Source: RLP

Kade Reed (born 20 March 2006) is an Australian rugby league footballer for St. George Illawarra in the National Rugby League (NRL).

Reed grew up in Wollongong and was involved in rugby league from a young age as a ballboy for the Illawarra Cutters. His father was one of the club's assistant coaches.

A diminutive halfback, Reed is a junior product of the Western Suburbs Red Devils, where he has also played first-grade, and formerly captained the Illawarra Steelers in the S. G. Ball Cup.

Reed got his first opportunity in first-grade for the Dragons in round eight of the 2026 NRL season, with new interim coach Dean Young immediately dropping halfback Kyle Flanagan upon his arrival. He played successive matches against the Sydney Roosters and Newcastle Knights, either side of a bye, then was sidelined for three months after suffering a hand injury, and finished the season in the NSW Cup.
