= Setu Tu =

Samoan rugby league footballer (born 1998)

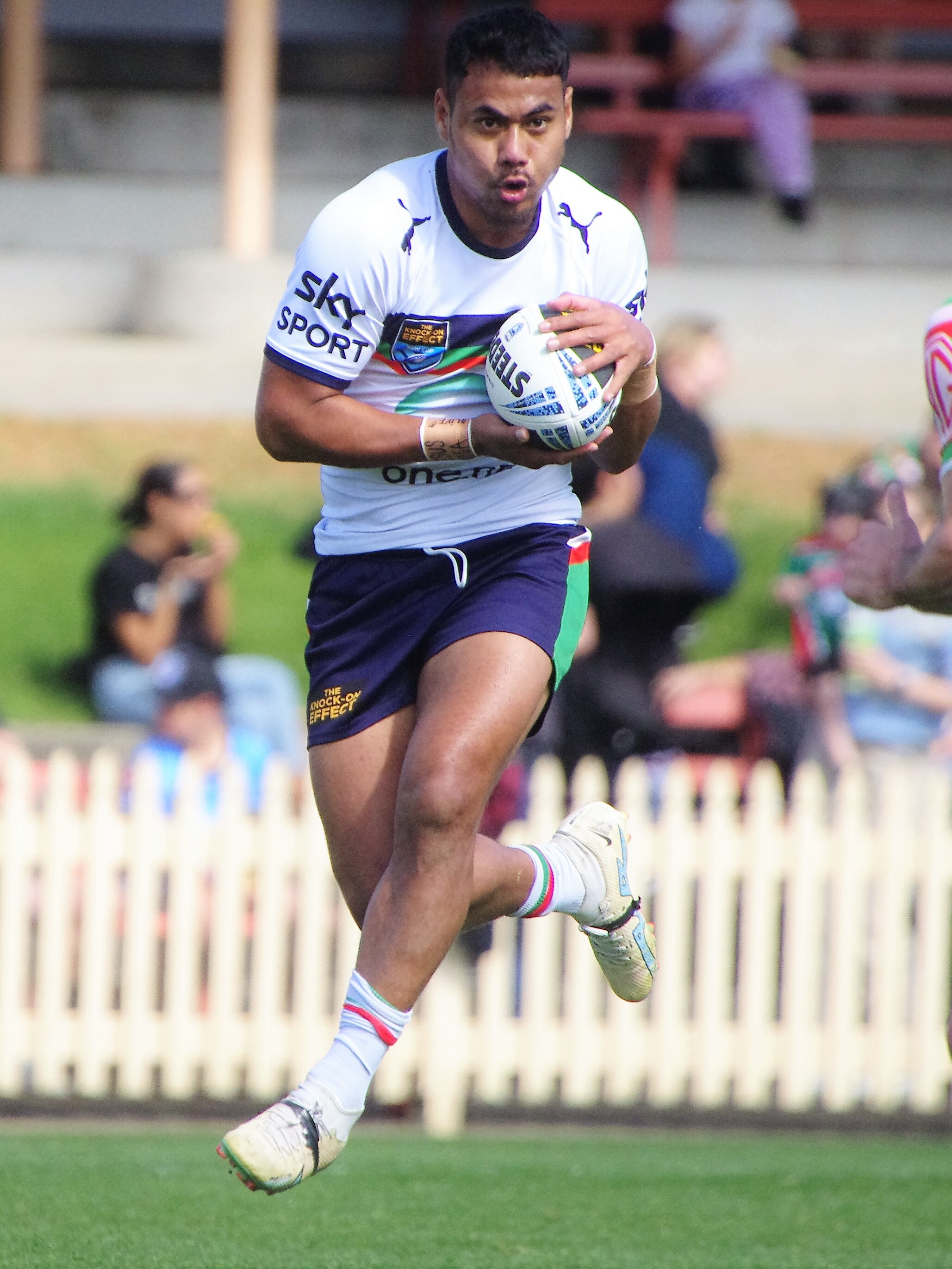

Personal information
- Full name: Setu Tu
- Born: 6 November 1998 (age 28) Saleimoa, Upolu, Samoa
- Height: 186 cm (6 ft 1 in)
- Weight: 96 kg (15 st 2 lb)

Playing information
- Position: Wing
Club
| Years | Team | Pld | T | G | FG | P |
|---|---|---|---|---|---|---|
| 2026– | St. George Illawarra | 19 | 10 | 0 | 0 | 40 |
- Source: As of 6 November 2026

Setu Tu (born 6 November 1998) is a Samoan professional rugby league footballer who plays as a winger for the St. George Illawarra Dragons in the National Rugby League.

== Background ==
Tu was born in Saleimoa, Upolu, Samoa. At the age of 15 he moved to New Zealand to live with his older brother.

He started playing rugby league at the age of 18, and later played for the Ōtāhuhu Leopards in Auckland.

== Playing career ==
=== Early career ===
==== Melbourne Storm ====
Tu was in the Melbourne Storm system.

==== New Zealand Warriors ====
Tu played for the New Zealand Warriors in the NSW Cup in 2019, scoring 15 tries in 15 games.

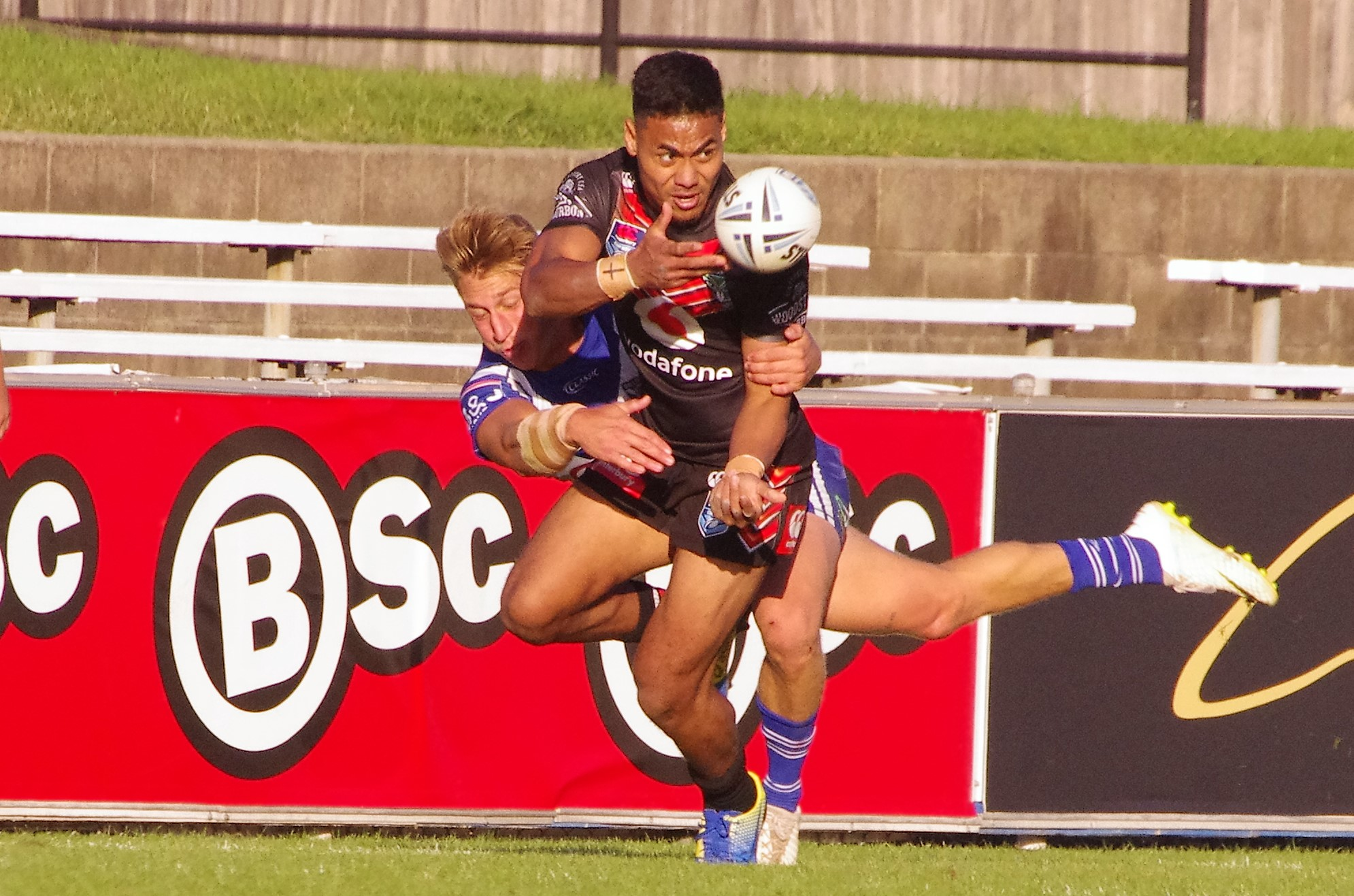
Tu playing for the Warriors in 2019

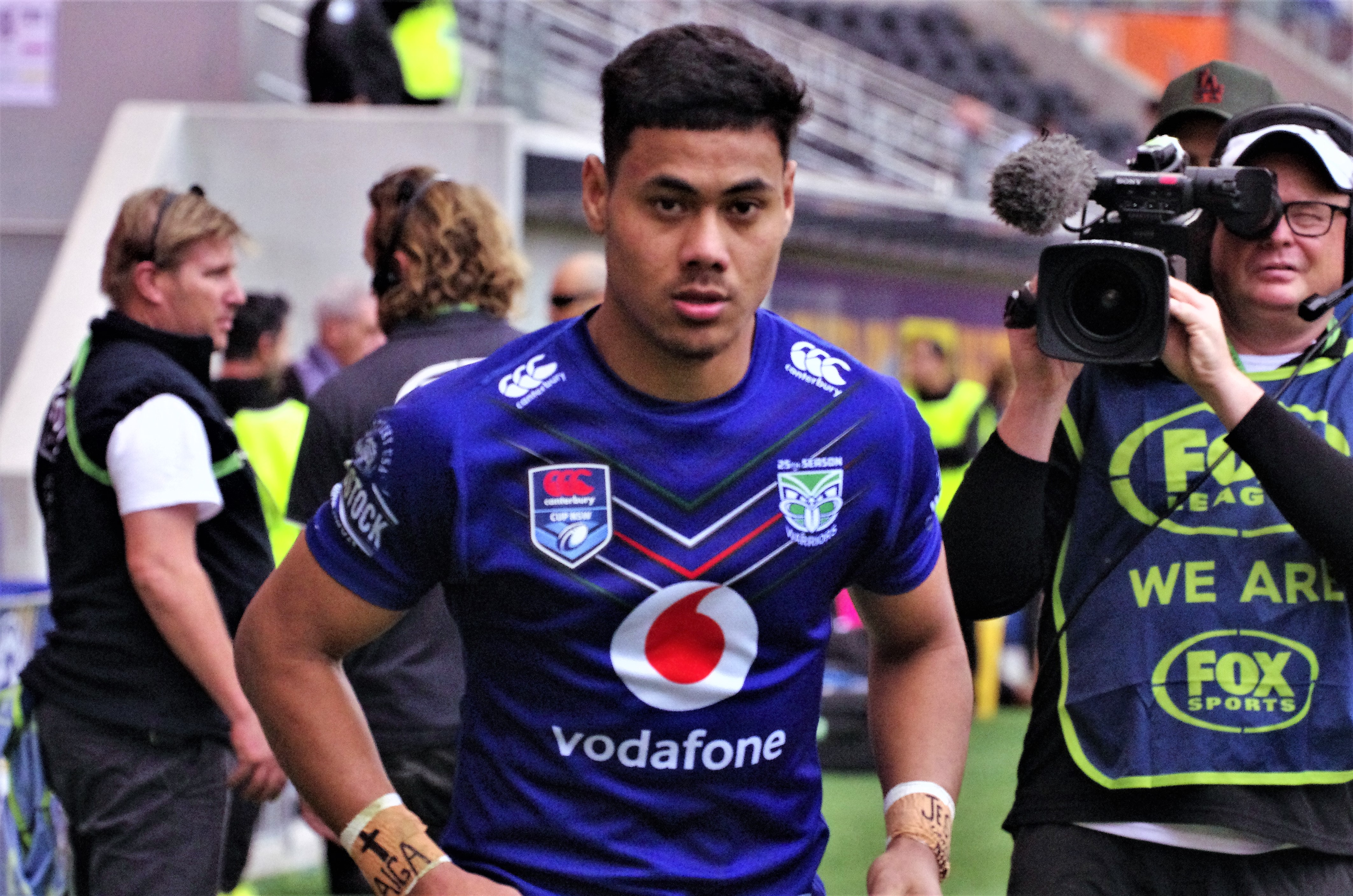
Tu taking the field for the Warriors at CommBank Stadium in 2019

In 2020 he played one game for the Warriors before the season was curtailed due to Covid-19.

==== Redcliffe Dolphins ====
Tu moved to the Redcliffe Dolphins in 2021, scoring two tries in 6 games in the Queensland Cup.

In the 2022 season Redcliffe he scored 13 tries in 19 games.

==== Return to the New Zealand Warriors ====
Tu returned to play for the New Zealand Warriors again in the NSW Cup in 2023, scoring 10 tries in 18 games.

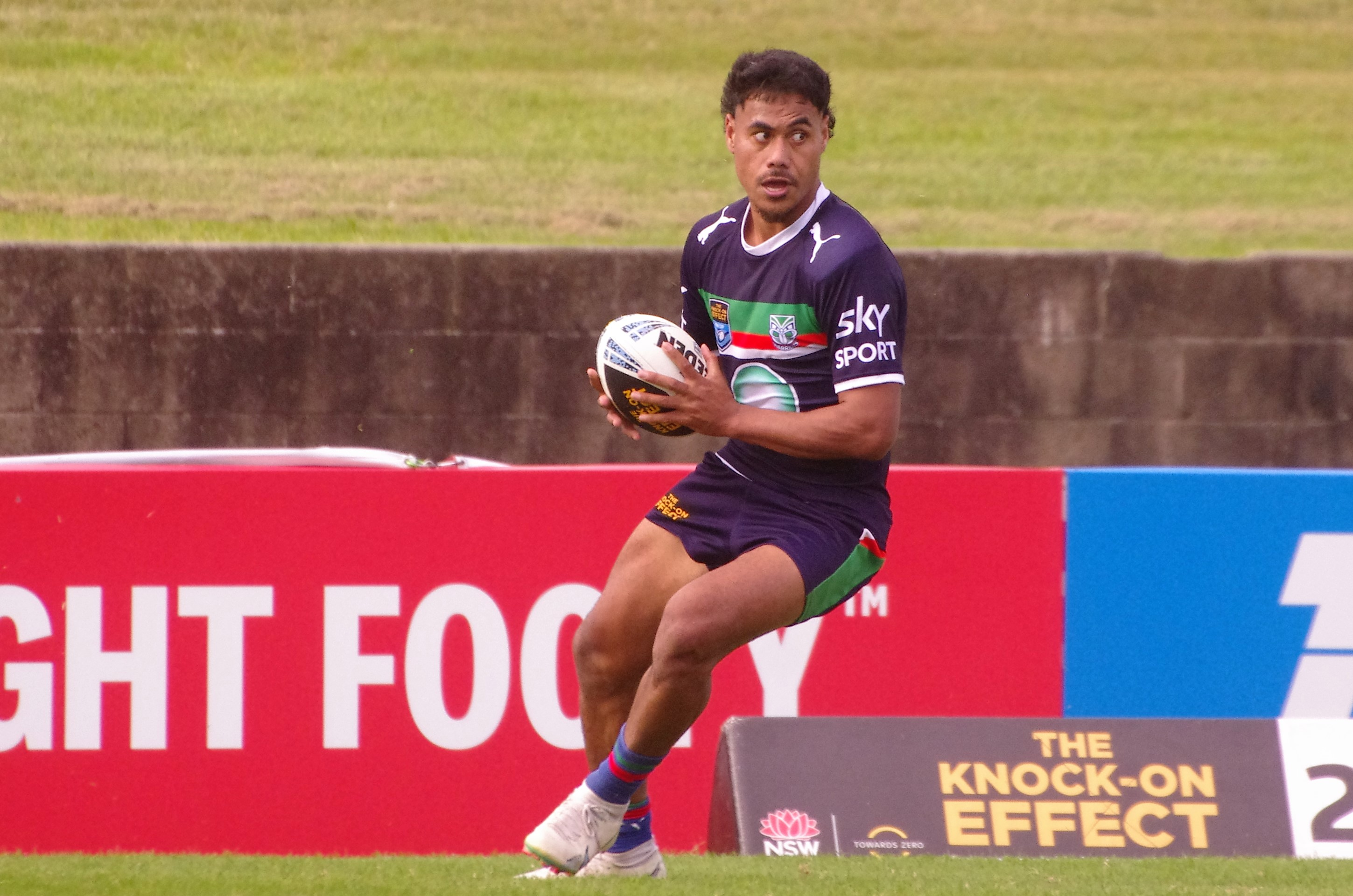
Tu playing for the Warriors in 2023

The following year he played 19 games and scored six tries for the Warriors at reserve grade level.

Tu featured in two NRL Pre-Season Challenge games in 2024. He was set to make his NRL debut in 2024, but a serious knee injury kept him out of the New Zealand Warriors side.

==== Brisbane Tigers ====
Tu moved to the Brisbane Tigers in 2025, scoring a try on debut in his only game for them in the Queensland Cup.

==== New Zealand Warriors 2025 ====
Tu returned once again to play for the New Zealand Warriors in the NSW Cup in 2025, scoring 13 tries in 14 games. He won the NSW Cup Grand Final in September 2025.

He won the NRL State Championship in October 2025.

He featured in a NRL Pre-Season Challenge game for the Warriors in 2025.

=== NRL career ===
Tu signed for St. George Illawarra on a two-year deal ahead of the 2026 NRL season.

In round 1 of the 2026 NRL season, Tu made his first grade debut for St. George Illawarra against the Canterbury-Bankstown Bulldogs at Allegiant Stadium in Las Vegas, scoring a try in a 15–14 loss. Tu played 18 matches for St. George Illawarra in the 2026 NRL season as the club finished with the Wooden Spoon.
