= Josh Kerr (rugby league) =

Australian rugby league footballer

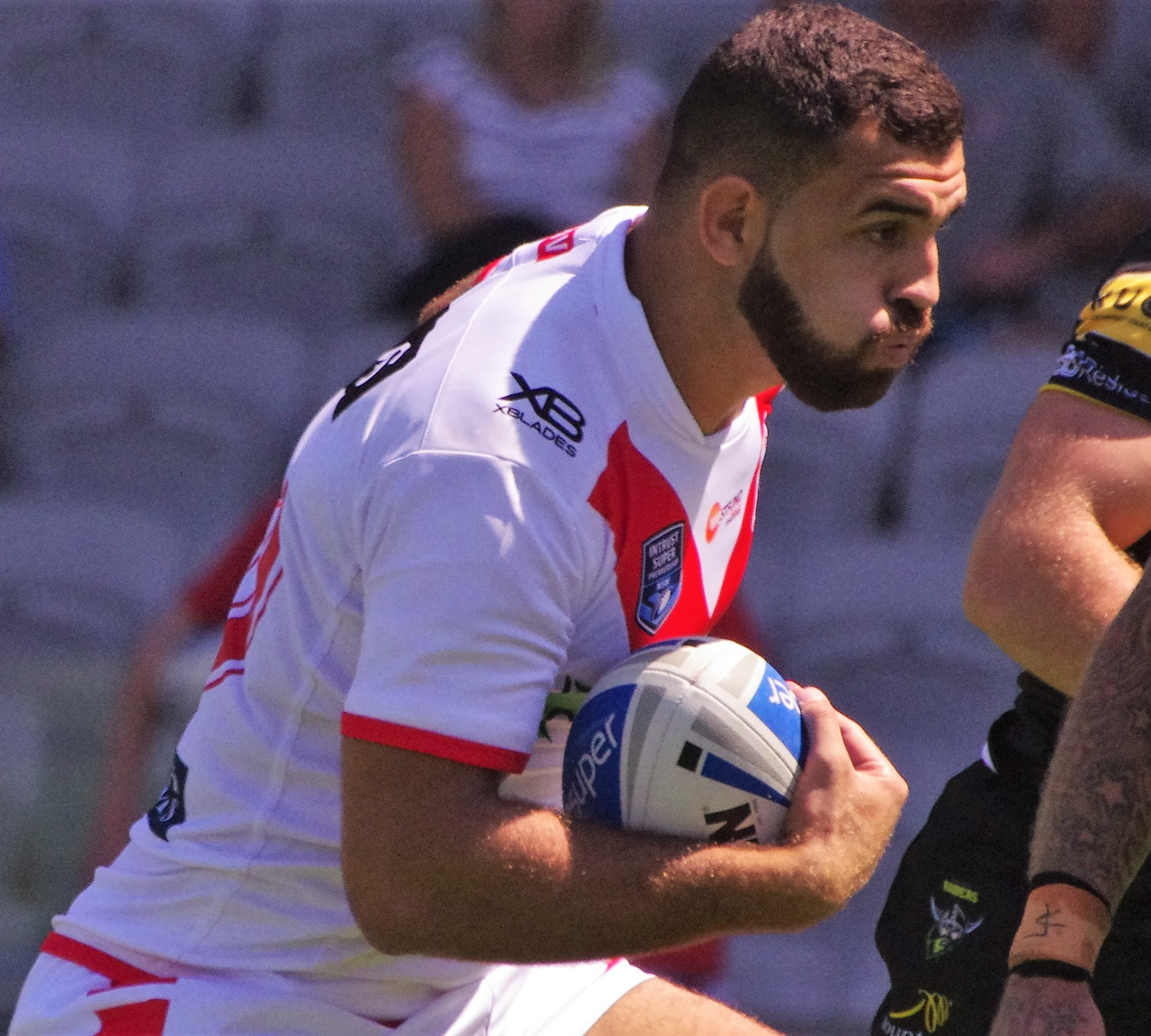

Personal information
- Full name: Joshua Kerr
- Born: 11 February 1996 (age 30) Brisbane, Queensland, Australia
- Height: 197 cm (6 ft 6 in)
- Weight: 112 kg (17 st 9 lb)

Playing information
- Position: Prop, Second-row
Club
Years	Team	Pld	T	G	FG	P
2019–23	St. George Illawarra	68	5	0	0	20
2023–25	Dolphins	48	3	0	0	12
2026	St. George Illawarra	19	0	0	0	0
2027–	Hull FC	0	0	0	0	0
	Total	135	8	0	0	32
Representative
Years	Team	Pld	T	G	FG	P
2019–25	Indigenous All Stars	7	1	0	0	4
- Source: As of 9 November 2026

Josh Kerr (born 11 February 1996) is an Australian rugby league footballer who plays as a prop for the Hull FC in the English Super League. He has played for the Indigenous All Stars at representative level.

He has previously played for the Dolphins and St. George Illawarra in the NRL.

== Background ==
Kerr was born in Brisbane, Queensland, Australia.

== Career ==
Kerr was a Redcliffe Dolphins junior and was signed to play in the Melbourne Storm's Under 20s and did a pre-season with them. He made 41 appearances for Melbourne in the NRL Under-20s competition across the 2015 and 2016 seasons, scoring 14 tries.

=== St George Illawarra Dragons (2019–2023) ===
Kerr represented the Indigenous All Stars in the 2019 All Stars match. On 21 March in round 2 of the 2019 NRL season, Kerr made his NRL debut for the St. George Illawarra Dragons against the South Sydney Rabbitohs.

In 2020, Kerr played all twenty games for St. George Illawarra and scored two tries. Kerr's form got him selected for the Queensland twenty-seven man squad for the 2020 State of Origin series. Although Kerr did not play any games in Queensland's 2-1 Series win, he was 18th man in Origin 2.

In the 2021 NRL season, Kerr played a total of nineteen matches for St. George Illawarra and scored two tries as the club finished 11th on the table and missed out on the finals. On 5 July, Kerr was fined $18,000 by the NRL and suspended for one game after breaching the game's COVID-19 biosecurity protocols when he attended a party along with twelve other St. George Illawarra players at Paul Vaughan's property.

In the 2022 NRL season, Kerr played seven games for St George Illawarra. The team finished tenth on the table and missed the finals for a fourth straight year.

In April 2023, Kerr signed a contract with the Dolphins club for the 2024 and 2025 seasons. He continuing playing for St. George Illawarra in the 2023 NRL season. However, Kerr was granted an early release on 18 June from the Dragons to join the Dolphins immediately.

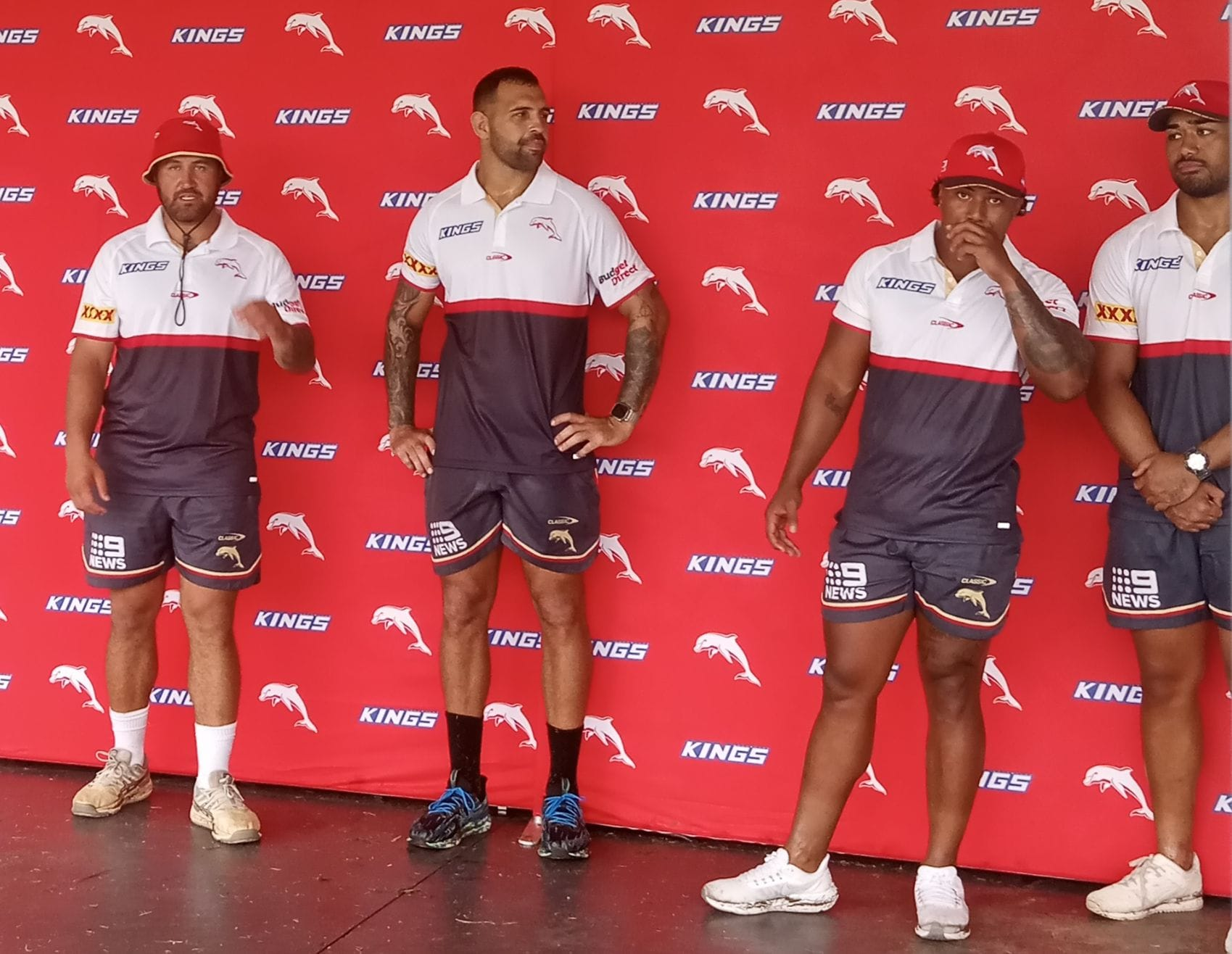
Kerr (second from left) with other Dolphins NRL players in 2024

=== Dolphins (2023–present) ===
In the 2023 NRL season, Kerr made his debut for the Dolphins in their round 17 match against the Parramatta Eels at Sunshine Coast Stadium. Kerr played a total of eight games for the Dolphins that year. Kerr played a total of 19 games for the Dolphins in the 2024 NRL season as the club finished 10th on the table.

In round 7 of the 2025 NRL season, Kerr made his 100th NRL appearance scoring a try in a 42–22 upset win over the Melbourne Storm.

In July, he was named as the 19th man for Queensland in the 2025 State of Origin series. The following day, Kerr was placed under investigation by the NRL for comments he made about referee Ashley Klein. Kerr said in an interview "I'm not sure how much trouble I could get into for saying it but geez I thought Ash Klein did a bit to try even it up or make it a bit closer, We were sitting there going, 'it's rorted, the game's rorted", We were all on the sideline just going, 'oh, no, it's a double agent'. The NRL later fined Kerr $10,000 over the comments however his club the Dolphins were set to contest the fine.

On 6 August 2025, St. George Illawarra announced that Kerr would return to the club in 2026 after securing a release from the Dolphins.

=== St. George Illawarra return ===
Kerr played 18 games for St. George Illawarra in the 2026 NRL season as the club finished with the Wooden Spoon. On 1 November it was reported that Kerr had departed that club for the Super League.

=== Hull FC ===
On 9 November 2026 it was reported that he had signed for Hull FC in the Super League

== Statistics ==
As of 1 October 2025

Kerr in 2026

Year	Team	Games	Tries	Pts
2019	St. George Illawarra Dragons	7	1	4
2020	St. George Illawarra Dragons	20	2	8
2021	St. George Illawarra Dragons	20	2	8
2022	St. George Illawarra Dragons	7	0	0
2023	St. George Illawarra Dragons	14	0	0
2023	Dolphins	8	0	0
2024	Dolphins	19	2	8
2025	Dolphins	21	1	4
2026	St. George Illawarra Dragons	18		
2027	Hull FC			
Total		135	8	32
