= Heritage Round (NRL) =

The National Rugby League Heritage Round was established in 2008 to celebrate the 101st anniversary of the inaugural New South Wales Rugby League 1908 premiership. This marked 100 years of rugby league in Australia. Each club would play a rivalry match against a club that joined the competition at a similar time, or one which had inherited the legacy of a past club.

== Heritage jerseys ==
Clubs wear a different jersey to their normal home and away strips to mark the significance of the Heritage Round clashes. This is an opportunity for clubs and fans to reflect on their heritage and past glories. As such, jerseys similar to a club's original strip, or strip worn at a particular match or final, are a way to reignite rivalries and past glories.

Some jerseys worn in Heritage Round reflect the jersey worn by a side when it first entered the NRL, such as those worn by the Brisbane Broncos, South Sydney Rabbitohs, St George Illawarra Dragons or Sydney Roosters. The design or colours of a jersey may also denote respect for a side from the same area which no longer exists, such as the design of the Gold Coast Titans and Newcastle Knights heritage jerseys in 2008.

Clubs have also worn jerseys that reflect an important milestone or event. An example of this is the Balmain heritage jersey worn by the Wests Tigers in the 2009 Heritage Round, marking 40 years since a famous Grand Final clash with the South Sydney Rabbitohs. Another example is the Melbourne Storm wearing their 2000 away strip in 2009, as it was the first jersey in predominantly purple colours.

== Heritage Round 2008 - centenary of rugby league ==
The first NRL Heritage Round was played in Round 6, 2008. It celebrated the anniversary of the first round of the 1908 premiership. Teams wore jerseys reflecting their club or region's first season in the competition.

Home	Score	Away	Match information
Home	Score	Away	Date and time	Venue	Referee	Crowd
Gold Coast Titans	26-24	Brisbane Broncos	18 April 2008, 7:30pm	Skilled Park	Tony Archer	27,176
Parramatta Eels	16-20	Manly-Warringah Sea Eagles	18 April 2008, 7:30pm	Parramatta Stadium	Shayne Hayne	14,025
Bulldogs	30-18	St George Illawarra Dragons	19 April 2008, 5:30pm	ANZ Stadium	Bernard Sutton	14,767
North Queensland Cowboys	48-20	New Zealand Warriors	19 April 2008, 7:30pm	Dairy Farmers Stadium	Jason Robinson	20,554
Cronulla Sharks	20-21	Penrith Panthers	19 April 2008, 7:30pm	Toyota Stadium	Sean Hampstead	13,852
Sydney Roosters	20-34	Newcastle Knights	20 April 2008, 2:00pm	Bluetongue Stadium	Steve Lyons	14,176
Wests Tigers	30-10	South Sydney Rabbitohs	20 April 2008, 3:00pm	Sydney Cricket Ground	Ben Cummins	19,122
Canberra Raiders	16-23	Melbourne Storm	21 April 2008, 7:00pm	Canberra Stadium	Jared Maxwell	15,550

== Heritage Round 2009 - second Heritage Round ==
The second NRL Heritage Round was played out in Round 10. The round opened with a thrilling match between the Dragons and Bulldogs.Hazem El Masri played his 300th career game, which was controversially settled by the video referee disallowing a try to Jamal Idris in the last minute to deny the Bulldogs victory in front of a packed Jubilee Oval. On the same night, a large crowd turned out in Brisbane to watch the local derby between the Brisbane Broncos and Gold Coast Titans.

Another memorable match was played out at the Sydney Cricket Ground on Sunday afternoon, as South Sydney and the Wests Tigers relived the 1969 Grand Final, with Souths narrowly defeating the Tigers in the dying moments of the game with a field goal.

Home	Score	Away	Match information
Home	Score	Away	Date and time (local)	Venue	Referee	Crowd
Brisbane Broncos	32-18	Gold Coast Titans	15 May 2009, 7:35pm	Suncorp Stadium	Gavin Badger; Shane Hayne	43,079
St George Illawarra Dragons	20-18	Bulldogs	15 May 2009, 7:35pm	WIN Jubilee Oval	Tony Archer; Ashley Klein	18,415
Sydney Roosters	6-38	Newcastle Knights	16 May 2009, 5:30pm	Sydney Football Stadium	Chris James; Steve Lyons	8,611
Penrith Panthers	26-22	Cronulla Sharks	16 May 2009, 7:30pm	CUA Stadium	Jared Maxwell; Gerard Sutton	11,750
New Zealand Warriors	12-34	North Queensland Cowboys	17 May 2009, 12:00pm	Mt Smart Stadium	Ben Cummins; Alan Shortall	16,345
Manly-Warringah Sea Eagles	34-10	Parramatta Eels	17 May 2009, 2:00pm	Brookvale Oval	Gavin Badger; Tony De Las Heras	15,916
Wests Tigers	22-23	South Sydney Rabbitohs	17 May 2009, 3:00pm	Sydney Cricket Ground	Ashley Klein; Jason Robinson	29,970
Melbourne Storm	46-6	Canberra Raiders	18 May 2009, 7:00pm	Olympic Park Stadium	Tony Archer; Brett Suttor	10,112

== See also ==
- AFL Heritage Round
