= St. George Illawarra Dragons =

Australian professional rugby league club, based in Wollongong & Kogarah, NSW

Club information
- Full name: St. George Illawarra Rugby League Football Club Pty. Limited
- Nickname(s): Dragons, Saints, Red V
- Short name: SGI
- Colours: Red; White
- Founded: 23 September 1998; 28 years ago (joint-venture of the St. George Dragons and Illawarra Steelers)
- Website: dragons.com.au

Current details
- Grounds: Wollongong Showground (22,000); Kogarah Oval (20,500)
- CEO: Tim Watsford
- Coach: Dean Young; Nathan Cross (NRLW)
- Captain: Damien Cook & Clinton Gutherson (NRL); Brooke Anderson (NRLW)
- Competition: National Rugby League
- 2026 season: 17th (NRL); 10th (NRLW)
- Current season

Uniforms
Home colours	Away colours

Records
- Premierships: 1 (2010)
- Runners-up: 1 (1999)
- Minor premierships: 2 (2009, 2010)
- World Club Challenge: 1 (2011)
- NSW Cup: 1 (2001)
- Wooden spoons: 1 (2026)
- Most capped: 273 – Ben Hornby
- Highest try scorer: 124 – Matt Cooper
- Highest points scorer: 977 – Jamie Soward

The St. George Illawarra Dragons are an Australian professional rugby league football club, representing both the Illawarra and St George regions of New South Wales. The club has competed in the National Rugby League (NRL) since 1999 after a joint-venture was formed between Sydney's St. George Dragons (est. 1921) and Wollongong's Illawarra Steelers (est. 1982).

The team has leagues clubs in both Wollongong and the Sydney suburb of Kogarah, plays games regularly at both WIN Stadium in Wollongong and Jubilee Oval in Kogarah, and has its high performance training and administration headquarters at The Bruce Gordon Centre in the Wollongong suburb of Fairy Meadow. From 1999 to 2006 the club was jointly owned by the St. George Dragons 50% and Illawarra Steelers 50%. In 2006 WIN Corporation purchased 50% of the Illawarra Steelers stake in the club before purchasing the rest of the Illawarra Steelers' share in August 2018.

The Dragons reached the grand final in their first season in 1999, losing to the Melbourne Storm. St. George Illawarra is one of only two clubs (the other being the Sydney Roosters in 1908) to finish runner-up in its inaugural season. St. George Illawarra also fields teams in local competitions within the St. George and Illawarra regions. In 2010, the Dragons won their second successive minor premiership and became the first team to be awarded the J. J. Giltinan Shield in consecutive years since the National Rugby League was formed in 1998.

The Dragons won the 2010 NRL Grand Final against the Sydney Roosters 32–8 at Stadium Australia, Sydney. They then won the 2011 World Club Challenge, defeating the Wigan Warriors 21–15 at DW Stadium in the UK. With its World Club Challenge victory, the club became the first Australian team since the Brisbane Broncos in 1992–3 to win the minor premiership, premiership and World Club Challenge simultaneously.

== History ==
Chart of yearly table positions for St. George Illawarra Dragons in First Grade NRL

In the wake of the Super League war of the mid-1990s, and the resulting split competition of 1997, the Illawarra Steelers found themselves struggling financially and seemed unlikely to survive past 1999. The St. George Dragons largely financed a proposal for a joint venture which would see the St George Illawarra Dragons playing in both Kogarah and Wollongong. Essentially, St George would provide the money while Illawarra would provide a broader junior and fan base. With the NRL's intention to rationalise the competition from 20 teams down to 14 teams and with a $4M incentive and a relaxing of salary cap requirements for a joint venture, the Dragons and the Steelers ensured their survival by forming the League's first joint venture on 23 September 1998.

=== David Waite and Andrew Farrar (1999–2002) ===
A joint venture entity being a new concept in Australian rugby league, the public watched closely in anticipation of success or failure. No-one was certain how the top players sourced from the two clubs would perform when they ran out onto the field. They were unsuccessful in their first outing, losing to the Parramatta Eels 20–10, but by the 4th round they had started to form some cohesion and would go on to achieve a top eight position on the competition ladder by the end of the regular season. In the semi-finals the Dragons won against the Melbourne Storm at Olympic Park, before returning to Sydney to dispose of the Sydney Roosters and the Cronulla-Sutherland Sharks to reach the Grand Final.

In the 1999 Grand Final, the club were leading by 14–0 at the break in front of a world record crowd of 107,999. A fairytale of a title in their first year as a joint venture seemed destined to come true; something of an advertisement to any other clubs considering the option of a joint venture, but Melbourne recovered from their poor start and went into the final minutes of the game with St. George Illawarra leading by 18–14. The Dragons were forced to perform a drop kick from their own goal line, and on the fifth tackle Brett Kimmorley kicked high towards St. George Illawarra's corner of the field. As Melbourne's winger Craig Smith caught the ball over the goal-line he was knocked unconscious in a tackle by Jamie Ainscough and lost the ball. Referee Bill Harrigan deferred to the video referee who ruled a penalty try on the grounds that contact had been made with the head, giving Melbourne a 20–18 lead and the premiership title.

In the 2000 NRL season though they had a rough start, and in Round 5, St. George Illawarra recorded their worst defeat for the club, losing 70–10 against the Melbourne Storm. This was the first game these two teams played against each other since the 1999 grand final, and was played at the MCG. On 3 May to the surprise and shock of fans and club officials, Anthony Mundine announced his retirement from the club and rugby league in general with immediate effect to pursue a career in boxing. The Dragons were not going well in the first half of the 2000 season, and the main coach David Waite was replaced with assistant coach, Andrew Farrar. Soon after the replacement of coaches, St. George Illawarra recorded their best ever win. They defeated the New Zealand Warriors 54–0 in round 14 at WIN Stadium, with debutant Amos Roberts scoring a record 22 points (one try and nine goals) for any first grade player on debut. St. George Illawarra, however, missed out of the finals series, and came 9th. Despite their poor season, Trent Barrett was awarded with the Dally M Medal.

=== Nathan Brown (2003–2008) ===
In 2003, Nathan Brown, the joint venture's first number 9 achieved the position of coach, becoming the youngest non-playing coach in premiership history at the age of 29. St. George Illawarra finished the season 10th. Nathan Brown was also involved in a sideline incident when he had slapped Trent Barrett in Wollongong during a game against Manly, and was issued a $5000 fine.

2004 saw the final season of the try scoring talent Nathan Blacklock. An extraordinary scoreline was seen in the round 25 clash with Manly. Trailing 34–10 after 53 minutes the club came back to win the match 36–34. This was the second biggest comeback in Australian Rugby League history. Finishing 5th, the club were eliminated in the first round of the finals after losing in a thrilling game 30–31 to 4th placed Penrith.

In 2005, after their worst start to a season yet (losing 5 of their first 6 games), the St. George Illawarra side finished second in a close season on the ladder at completion of the 2005 NRL season, just behind minor premiers the Parramatta Eels on points difference. After progressing to the finals they defeated local rivals the Cronulla-Sutherland Sharks 28–22 in the quarter-final of the finals series though the Dragons eventually fell 12–20 to eventual champions the Wests Tigers in the Preliminary Final. The club broke the ground record at WIN Stadium twice in the 2005 season. First against rivals the Sydney Roosters and then at their home quarter final game against the Cronulla-Sutherland Sharks.

In early 2006, WIN Television Network bought a 25% stake in the Illawarra Steelers Club for $6.5 million, erasing most of the debt Illawarra had to St. George. This formalised the strong support the network has shown for the Steelers in years gone by and ensured that Wollongong continued to host world class rugby league matches.

After a bad start to the 2006 NRL season, the club put on a midseason seven/game winning streak. This was followed by a form slump, with a record five consecutive losses, only to return to form with a victory over the Wests Tigers, and continue this positive form leading into the finals. The club ended the regular season in sixth position.

In the finals campaign, St George Illawarra faced the Brisbane Broncos at Suncorp Stadium in the first round, St. George Illawarra won the game 20–4. In the second round, they met the Manly-Warringah Sea Eagles at the Sydney Football Stadium winning 28–0. In the grand final qualifier, they played the Melbourne Storm, where the club went down 24–10 bowing out of season 2006.

St. George Illawarra could take solace from the fact that they did defeat the eventual premiers, Brisbane, three times during the 2006 season – 26–12 at Wollongong in Round 4, 18–16 at Suncorp Stadium in Round 15 and the aforementioned qualifying final match.

Season 2007 saw an early injury to Mark Gasnier in the Charity Shield match against South Sydney Rabbitohs creating another poor start for the Dragons. Combined with the loss of key players such as Luke Bailey, Trent Barrett and Shaun Timmins in the off-season, the Dragons faced NRL newcomers, the Gold Coast Titans, in Round 1. The joint-venture club won the historic match 20–18, however lost 6 more matches after that leaving the Saints sitting in 15th place on the NRL Ladder. This was a very inexperienced Dragons team that seemed destined for a poor injury plagued season. However, in Round 17 (vs Canberra Raiders at WIN Stadium), the Saints scored four times more points than their previous game average, winning the match 58–16, equalling their highest ever score and their largest victory in three years. The club's season ended with a 28–24 loss to the Manly-Warringah Sea Eagles at Brookvale Oval, finishing in 13th place, their lowest finish to date.

2008 saw the end of an era, with coach Nathan Brown's contract not renewed after yet another poor start to the season, winning one of their first six matches. The club received a boost in May when former dual-code international player Wendell Sailor joined the team. Several notable players departed at the end of the year including Jason Ryles and captain Mark Gasnier. The club finished the season in 7th place, however they lost in the first round of the finals to eventual premiers Manly (whom they defeated 20–18 in round 11) 34–6 at Brookvale Oval ending yet another disappointing season. The era under Brown was one of frustration for Dragons fans, as there were high expectations for the strong side, but ultimately no premierships.

=== Wayne Bennett (2009–2011) ===
2009, a new season a new coach and ground sponsor WIN at Jubilee Oval. Several new faces joined the club, including Jeremy Smith, Darius Boyd, Neville Costigan, Michael Weyman and Luke Priddis. The season opener against the Storm ended in a thrilling golden point extra time loss (17–16). Round 3 set a new crowd record with the victorious return to WIN Jubilee against Cronulla.

They were consistently placed first on the competition ladder in 2009, contributed by a continuous winning streak of seven games since their win against the North Queensland Cowboys on 14 June. They lost first position after a three-game losing streak while the Canterbury-Bankstown Bulldogs won all games in that period, but remain in the top three. However, in the final round of the 2009 regular season, St. George Illawarra defeated in-form Parramatta Eels 37–0, a game in which winger Brett Morris obtained a hat-trick and man of the match honours, while Canterbury lost 34–12 to the Wests Tigers. In the same game, St. George Illawarra five-eighth Jamie Soward surpassed Harry Bath's record for most points in a season by a St. George player. As a result, St. George Illawarra won the minor premiership for the 2009 and Wayne Bennett's first season at the club, but the team was eliminated from the finals after losing both their finals matches, therefore becoming the first minor premiers since 1993. In the first match they were humbled in front of a packed Jubilee Stadium, before traveling to face Bennett's former team. Brisbane defeated the Saints.

Season 2010 saw the club lose seven matches – the same tally as in the 2009 home-and-away season, against eventual wooden spooners the Melbourne Storm, 2008 premiers the Manly-Warringah Sea Eagles, their perennial bogey team the Canberra Raiders, 2003 premiers the Penrith Panthers in round 17, the Gold Coast Titans in extra time in round 20, Bennett's old team the Brisbane Broncos in round 21 and a second time to the Canberra Raiders in round 24. The team has been placed first since round five.

The team won its second minor premiership in succession (the first NRL team to do so since the inception of the NRL in 1998) with victory against the Newcastle Knights in the penultimate round of the 2010 NRL season. The joint-venture club had led the competition from round five right through to the final round, spending 21 consecutive weeks on top of the ladder and therefore spending the longest period of time on top of the ladder in NRL history (not including the Melbourne Storm).

St George Illawarra met Manly in the first week of the 2010 finals and produced a 28–0 victory. St. George Illawarra then defeated Wests Tigers 13–12 with Jamie Soward kicking the winning field goal for a place in the 2010 NRL Grand Final.

In the 2010 NRL Grand Final, St. George Illawarra defeated the Sydney Roosters 32–8, to secure the club's first grand final victory. The club overcame a poor first half performance to pull a thrilling victory out of the hat. This victory made Wayne Bennett's grand final record at 7 wins from 8 and thus continuing Brian Smith's poor grand final record of 4 losses from 4. Darius Boyd won a premiership with Bennett and the Brisbane Broncos in 2006, won the Clive Churchill Medal for best on ground in the match. The Grand Final victory also ended 31 years of hurt for St. George fans as the club had lost previous finals in 1985, 1992, 1993, 1996 and 1999.

St George Illawarra began their 2011 Season with pre-season wins in trials over Canterbury and South Sydney in the Charity Shield. The club also claimed its first World Club Challenge Championship, defeating Wigan Warriors 21–15 at DW Stadium. As of Round 14 2011, the Dragons have won 10 straight (excluding a 14–14 draw against Parramatta in Round 13).

It was announced in March 2011 that Bennett would leave St. George Illawarra after the 2011 NRL season, signing a four-year deal with the Newcastle Knights from the 2012 season onwards. Steve Price was named as his successor.

=== Steve Price and Paul McGregor (2012 – 2020) ===
The club's cheer squad, The Flames, performing during the Dragons' Anzac Day match against the Roosters in 2018.

2012 saw the club with a new coach. St. George Illawarra narrowly missed out on a Finals spot, finishing up in 9th position. Several notable players departed from the club at the end of the season, including Ben Hornby and Dean Young, who both retired from the sport. The start of the 2013 NRL season saw the arrival of few key acquisitions, namely Gerard Beale from the Broncos and Tyson Frizell from the Cronulla-Sutherland Sharks.

The season was plagued by inconsistent form, alongside injuries and speculation regarding Price's future at the club. After winning three straight matches on the lead up to the annual Anzac Day clash with the Sydney Roosters, it was announced that Price would be signed for another year with an option for a second at the clubs disposal. Despite the clubs faith in Price as well as the arrival of star fullback Josh Dugan from Canberra – in a mid-season transfer, the club was unable to string together consistent performances and finished the year at 14th position.

Star five-eighth Gareth Widdop joined the club for 2014, but by late May 2014, just after the star signing of Benji Marshall, the board sacked Price as coach due to some embarrassing defeats to start the season. Assistant coach Paul McGregor was named as his replacement until the end of the season, and was eventually employed full-time following improved results. This culminated in the club returning to the finals in 2015 and enjoying a successful year.

In the 2017 NRL season, St George Illawarra lead the competition after the first eight rounds before a dramatic slide which saw the club record only six wins for the rest of the season. In the final match of the regular season, St George Illawarra played against Canterbury with a win guaranteeing them a finals spot and jumping ahead of North Queensland. With under ten minutes to play, St George Illawarra were ahead on the scoreboard before two quick tries gave Canterbury a 26–20 victory.

The 2018 NRL season saw the arrival of two star signings, English international James Graham and the Australian and Queensland halfback Ben Hunt. These signings and a successful season culminated in the club returning to the finals in 2018 and enjoyed a successful year. On 9 September 2018, St. George Illawarra Dragons won their first qualifying final in 8 years, defeating the Brisbane Broncos 48–18 at Suncorp Stadium. The following week, St George Illawarra played against South Sydney in week 2 of the finals series and were defeated 13–12 in a tight game. The match was also the first time since 1984 that the two clubs had played each other in the finals.

The Intrust Super Premiership NSW St. George Illawarra also had a strong year finishing second at the end of the regular season were they made the preliminary final but were defeated 28–26 by Canterbury.

In August 2018 WIN Corporation purchased the Illawarra Steelers remaining 25% stake in the club for a "commercially in confidence" sum. The St George Dragons and WIN Corporation now have a 50% stake each. WIN Corporation has paid off the $6 million debt the St. George Illawarra Dragons owed the NRL. The club's home venues will continue to be WIN Stadium and Jubilee Stadium.

Before the start of the 2019 NRL season, St. George Illawarra were expected by many to reach the finals and continue their good form from the previous year. A few weeks out from the club's first match, Jack de Belin was stood down indefinitely by the NRL in relation to an incident which happened in December 2018. On 18 April 2019, McGregor was granted a two-year contract extension by St. George Illawarra, keeping him at the club as the head coach until the end of the 2021 NRL season after the side had won four of their first six games.

St. George Illawarra would then go to only win three of their next 17 matches which left them second last on the table above the last placed Gold Coast. On 2 September 2019, it was revealed that McGregor's position at head coach would be coming under review following the conclusion of the season. St. George Illawarra finished 15th on the ladder and did not qualify for the finals after having a horror season.

On 13 August 2020, McGregor was terminated as head coach of St. George Illawarra after a poor start to the season left the club with four wins in thirteen games, he was subsequently replaced by Dean Young. At the end of the 2020 NRL season, the club finished a disappointing 12th on the table and missed out on the finals.

=== Anthony Griffin (2021–2023) ===
On 7 September 2020, Anthony Griffin was appointed the coach for 2021 NRL season on a two-year deal.

On 1 June 2021, it was announced that Jack de Belin would return from his 987-day hiatus after charges against him were dropped.

On 5 July 2021, the NRL handed out a total of $305,000 in fines to 13 players of the club after they attended Paul Vaughan's property for a party in the midst of COVID-19 restrictions which were in breach of the code's bio security protocols.

The season finished with the club finishing in 11th place, missing out on finals for the third consecutive year. The season started with four wins from the first five games, however over the next 19 games, the club only obtained another four victories, with the club losing eight matches in a row to close out the season after the infamous barbeque. It capped off a mediocre first year under Griffin's reign. St. George Illawarra finished the 2022 NRL season in 10th place and missed the finals. Between round 17 to round 22, the club managed to win only one match which saw them go from 8th to 11th on the table. St. George Illawarra would win their last three matches of the season to finish in 10th position.

Before the start of the 2023 NRL season, many experts and pundits predicted St. George Illawarra to finish with the Wooden Spoon. After having a bye in the first round, the club defeated the Gold Coast in round 2 by a score of 32–18. In March 2023, it was revealed that Griffin had been told by club officials that they were looking for a potential coaching replacement in 2024 and that Griffin would have to re-apply for his position. On 16 May 2023, it was announced that St. George Illawarra had terminated Griffin's contract effective immediately. Griffin was informed of the decision at 8AM just before the players training session. On 14 June 2023, it was announced that former Cronulla head coach Shane Flanagan had signed a three-year deal to be St. George Illawarra's new coach starting in 2024. In late June 2023, star player Ben Hunt requested an immediate release from his St. George Illawarra contract. It was reported that Hunt, became unhappy after head coach, Anthony Griffin, was sacked by the club. On 26 June, Hunt's request to be released by St. George Illawarra was denied by the club. St. George Illawarra would finish the 2023 NRL season in 16th place, just two points above wooden spooners the Wests Tigers.

=== Shane Flanagan (2024-2026) ===
Before the start of the 2024 NRL season, many pundits predicted St. George Illawarra to finish with the Wooden Spoon after the club had finished 16th the previous year. The club would surprise many however earning victories over Melbourne, Penrith and the New Zealand Warriors who had made the preliminary final in 2023. With two matches left, the club needed just one victory to secure a finals spot but lost both games and finished 11th on the table.

In the 2025 NRL season, St. George Illawarra endured a difficult campaign winning three of there first 7 fixtures and then had a horrid season, going on a 5 match losing streak under halfback Kyle Flanagan, St. George Illawarra, also suffered other embarrassing losses throughout the year including losing 40 nil to perennial rivals the South Sydney Rabbitohs and suffering a 56–6 loss against the Dolphins. The club would eventually finish 15th on the table. There was also talk throughout the year of disharmony and nepotism behind the scenes at the club. On 8 August 2025, Shane Flanagan's contract as head coach was extended until the end of 2028.

To start the 2026 NRL season, St. George Illawarra lost their first seven matches, the worst start in the club's history, including the histories of St. George and Illawarra as separate entities.

Amid mounting pressure and continued poor on-field performances, Shane Flanagan was dismissed as head coach on 20 April 2026 following a winless start to the season, with General Manager of Football Ben Haran also departing the club.

St. George Illawarra would go on to lose their opening twelve matches to start the 2026 NRL season. In round 13, the club won their first game in 295 days defeating defending premiers Brisbane at Suncorp Stadium. Despite a late season surge which saw the club win two games in a row for the first time in twelve months, St. George Illawarra's first ever wooden spoon was all but confirmed after the club lost to rivals Canterbury in round 25. St. George Illawarra needed to win their remaining three matches and hoped other results went their way in order to avoid last place. It was also the first time since 1938 that any St. George affiliated side had come last in the top grade.

== Colours and jerseys ==
=== Name and emblem ===
Dragons secondary logo 2024-present

The team colours of the St. George Illawarra Dragons are red and white, colours shared by both the St. George Dragons and Illawarra Steelers. The merged entity's logo was taken directly from that of St George, with the addition of "Illawarra" to the bottom of the emblem. The emblem reflected the rich history of the St George Dragons, including an unprecedented and unmatched 11 consecutive premierships from 1956 to 1966, and the future strength of the club with the Illawarra.

The club name Dragons, is a shortened version of "Dragonslayers", the original nickname of St George. The emblem features a red shield with a silhouette of St. George, overlaid with a white stylised Dragon, with the words "ST. GEORGE" and "ILLAWARRA" above and below the shield respectively. It was originally intended for St George to face right and the Dragon to face left.

In October 2024, the Dragons unveiled a digital rebrand of the iconic primary logo, which has defined the St George Illawarra Dragons since the club's inception. The primary shield logo continues to feature prominently on club jerseys, ensuring that the heritage and essence of the club remain firmly rooted in their visual identity. However, it is in the digital space where the new logo will take centre stage. This update aims to simplify the logo, while respecting and preserving the rich heritage of the Dragons. The dragon in the new secondary logo has been adapted directly from the one within the traditional shield, ensuring a respectful tribute to the past while meeting the demands of today's digital world.

=== Jerseys ===
When the St George Illawarra Dragons were formed in 1998, it was decided that the jersey of St George (first used in 1945), the famous "Red V" on white, would become the main jersey for the new club. The red used was changed to the scarlet tone used by the Steelers.

The alternate jersey initially used by the club was red and white horizontal stripes, similar to the 1921 St George Jersey known as the "blood and bandages". Since 2006, this Jersey has been reserved for use as the St George Illawarra Heritage Jersey for special occasions. This Jersey is worn during Heritage Round, when the Dragons confront fierce local rivals the Bulldogs RLFC.

In 2004 and 2005, the club used a jersey similar to the Steelers main jersey for Heritage matches, acknowledging the rugby league history of the Illawarra region, though not as a full-time alternate strip. This jersey was predominantly red with white stripes on the sleeves. With Adidas producing the club's official merchandise from 2006, a generic Adidas design – predominantly red with three white stripes down the sleeves – was adopted as the full-time alternate strip; before another re-design in 2008, which better reflected the old Steelers jersey.

Reebok produced supporter and team kits from the 2010 season until 2013. Again the Red V was the Main jersey and the Alternate jersey was a red design with white slash marks. ISC became St George Illawarra's apparel partner in 2014 until 2017. XBlades became the main supplier for the 2018 season and ended their contract in 2020. Classic Sportswear currently produce the club's team kits and supporter gear.

== Home grounds ==
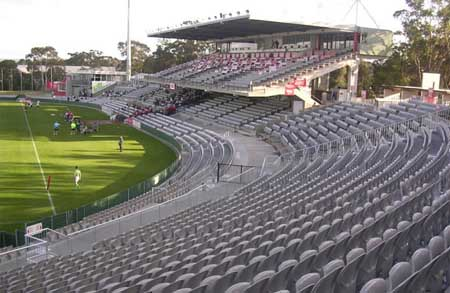
Inside Jubilee Oval

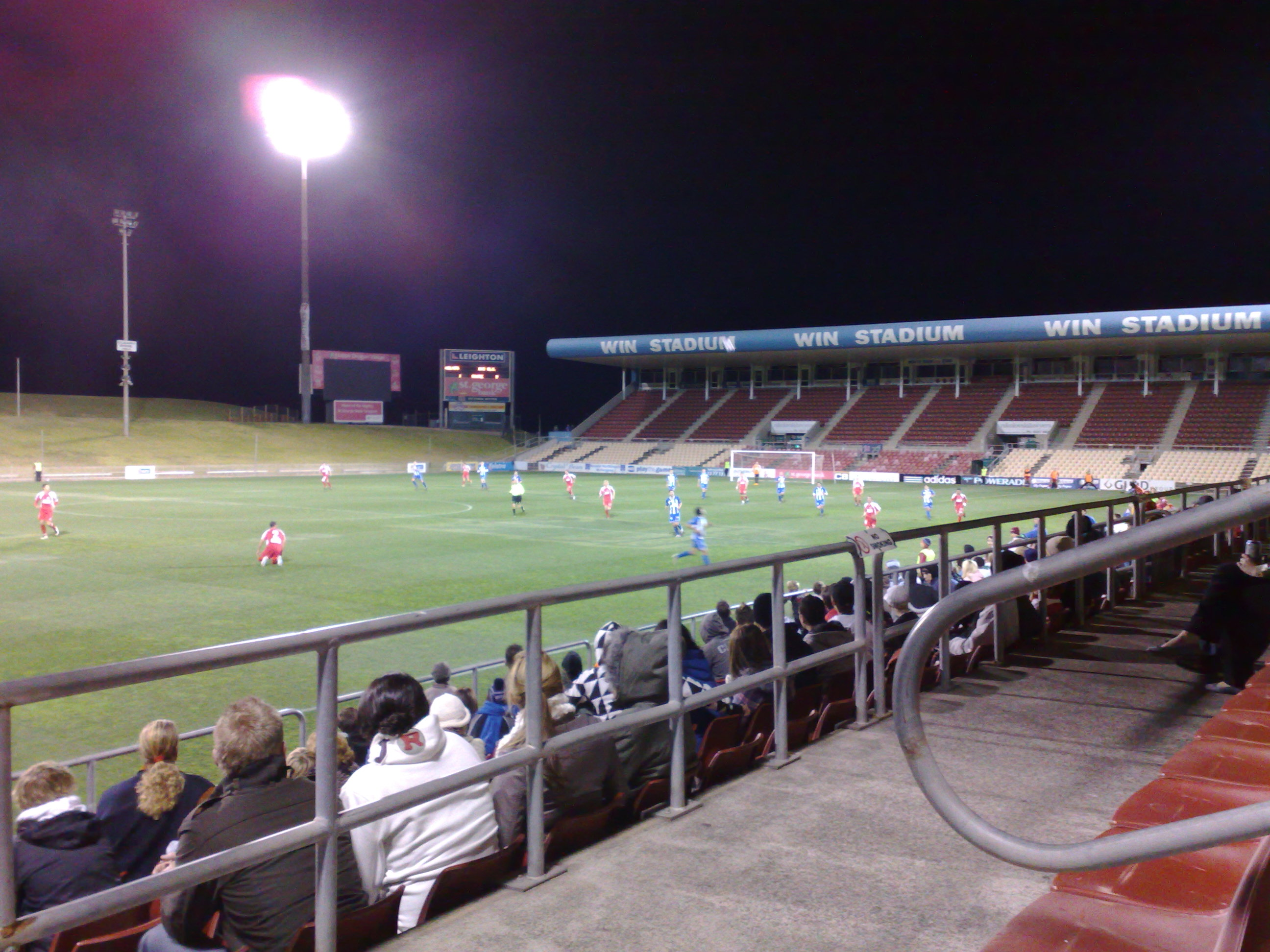
Inside WIN Stadium

The Dragons have two home grounds, reflecting the joint nature of the club:

- WIN Stadium (1999–present)
- Jubilee Oval (1999, 2003–07, 2009–present)

Half of the Dragons home matches are played at WIN Stadium (previously the home ground of the Illawarra Steelers) and the half at Jubilee Oval (previously the home of the St George Dragons).

The club has previously played Sydney home games out of the Sydney Football Stadium (2000–2002) and Stadium Australia (2008), as well as the Sydney Cricket Ground on special occasions.

The club has taken their home ground advantage away from their usual home grounds to the Sydney Football Stadium for the Club ANZAC Game against the Sydney Roosters in the 2004, 2006, 2010, 2012, 2014, 2016, 2018, 2024 and 2026 seasons. In 2002 when the match was first held, the Sydney Football Stadium was, at the time, one of the Dragons' main home grounds, whilst in 2008 the match was played at ANZ Stadium, a very unpopular move amongst supporters.

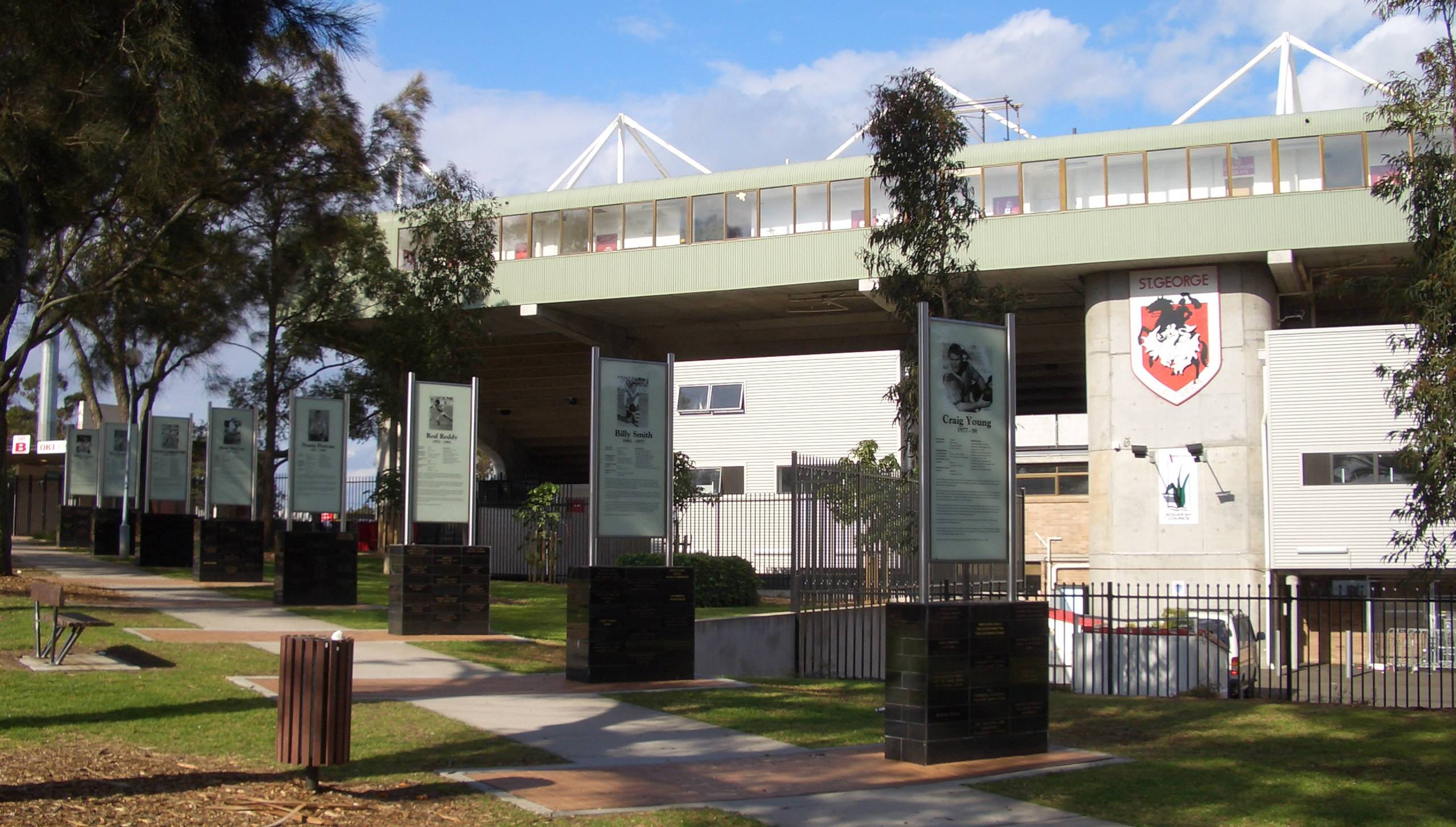
Outside Jubilee Oval, that includes a Walk of Fame

=== Right Game Right Venue Strategy ===
In 2013, the club entered into a four-year agreement with the NRL to move 4 of their 12 home games to one of the major Sydney stadiums (Allianz Stadium, Sydney Cricket Ground, ANZ Stadium).

The strategic intent was to replicate the success of the annual game played against Sydney Roosters on ANZAC day. As part of this initiative, the club and the NRL sought to introduce an annual Heritage Round game against South Sydney at the Sydney Cricket Ground.

In 2017, the club announced that the NRL had only provided three appropriate games to support this initiative for the 2017 season.

It was announced that from the 2018 NRL season that all games (except for the ANZAC clash against the Sydney Roosters and one other round) would be shared equally between Kogarah and Wollongong.

== Leagues clubs ==
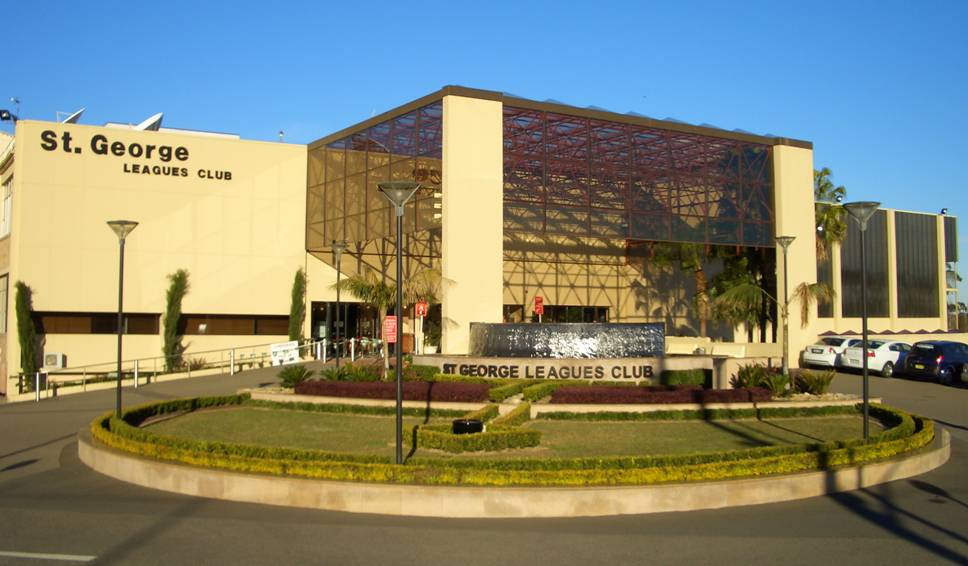
St George Leagues Club, Beverley Park, Sydney

As well as having two administrative offices, St. George Illawarra are supported by two separate Leagues clubs – one in each of the St. George and Illawarra areas.

=== St. George Dragons ===
The St. George Leagues Club is located on the Princes Highway at Beverley Park close to the northern home ground of Jubilee Oval at Carlton. Established in 1963, St. George was one of the first Super Leagues clubs developed in the 60s and was commonly referred to as the Taj Mahal because of the use of white marble in the original building. Very little of the original building is still there today after extensive refurbishing and redesigning the entire club to make it one of the most superbly fitting clubs in Australia.

=== Illawarra Steelers ===
Situated in the middle of the City Beach precinct, the Steelers Club is located adjacent to WIN Entertainment Centre and WIN Stadium. It is directly across the road from the grounds Western Grandstand. Established in 1990, the club has struggled financially against much larger and more popular leagues clubs in Wollongong, such as Collegians, Dapto Leagues Club, Wests Illawarra Leagues Club, and Shellharbour Workers Club in Shellharbour. However, after a major restructure of its operations, the Steelers Club traded profitably. Twenty percent of the club premises were sold to Bermuda-based Billionaire and owner of WIN Corp, Bruce Gordon. The sale fetched $2.6 million.

Stadium records

Highest Attendances at WIN Jubilee Oval

Crowd	Against	Date
20,847	St. George Illawarra v Cronulla	29 March 2009
19,892	St. George Illawarra v Wests Tigers	29 May 2011
19,319	St. George Illawarra v Parramatta	1 May 2011
19,173	St. George Illawarra v Melbourne	6 May 2018
18,415	St. George Illawarra v Canterbury	15 May 2009

Highest attendances at WIN Stadium

Crowd	Against	Date
19,608	St. George Illawarra v Cronulla	10 September 2005
19,512	St. George Illawarra v Sydney Roosters	29 June 2005
19,501	St. George Illawarra v Canterbury	28 July 2007
18,988	St. George Illawarra v Penrith	28 July 2024
18,980	St. George Illawarra South Sydney	31 July 2011
18,974	St. George Illawarra v Sea Eagles	27 June 2011

== Season summaries ==
P=Premiers, R=Runners-Ups, M=Minor Premierships, F=Finals Appearance, W=Wooden Spoons (Brackets Represent Finals Games)
Competition	Games Played (FINALS)	Games Won (FINALS)	Games Drawn (FINALS)	Games Lost (FINALS)	Ladder Position	P	R	M	F	W	NRL Nines	Coach	Captain	Notes	Details
1999 NRL Season	24(4)	15(3)	0	9(1)	6/17		X		X		—	David Waite; Andrew Farrar	Paul McGregor	Runners Up	1999 St. George Illawarra Dragons season
2000 NRL Season	26	12	0	14	9/14						—	David Waite; Andrew Farrar	Craig Smith	Barrett receives Dally M medal	2000 St. George Illawarra Dragons season
2001 NRL Season	26(2)	12(1)	2	12(1)	7/14				X		—	Andrew Farrar	Craig Smith	Ainscough and Barrett represent NSW	2001 St. George Illawarra Dragons season
2002 NRL Season	24(2)	9(1)	3	12(1)	7/15				X		—	Andrew Farrar	Trent Barrett	Barrett new captain	2002 St. George Illawarra Dragons season
2003 NRL Season	24	11	0	13	10/15						—	Nathan Brown	Trent Barrett	Nathan Brown becomes coach	2003 St. George Illawarra Dragons season
2004 NRL Season	24(1)	14	0	10(1)	5/15				X		—	Nathan Brown	Trent Barrett	Dragons have a 24-point comeback	2004 St. George Illawarra Dragons season
2005 NRL Season	24(2)	16(1)	0	8(1)	2/15				X		—	Nathan Brown	Trent Barrett	Gasnier Centre of the year	2005 St. George Illawarra Dragons season
2006 NRL Season	24(3)	14(2)	0	10(1)	6/15				X		—	Nathan Brown	Trent Barrett	Gasnier Centre of the year	2006 St. George Illawarra Dragons season
2007 NRL Season	24	9	0	15	13/16						—	Nathan Brown	Various	Sign Jamie Soward	2007 St. George Illawarra Dragons season
2008 NRL Season	24(1)	13	0	11(1)	7/16				X		—	Nathan Brown	Mark Gasnier, Ben Hornby, Jason Ryles	Nathan Brown not renewed as coach for 2009	2008 St. George Illawarra Dragons season
2009 NRL Season	24 (2)	17	0	7 (2)	1/16			X	X		—	Wayne Bennett	Ben Hornby	Minor Premiers	2009 St. George Illawarra Dragons season
2010 NRL Season	24(3)	17(3)	0	7	1/16	X		X	X		—	Wayne Bennett	Ben Hornby	Minor Premiers, Premiers	2010 St. George Illawarra Dragons season
2011 NRL season	24(2)	14	1	9(2)	5/16				X		—	Wayne Bennett	Ben Hornby	World Club Challenge Champions	2011 St. George Illawarra Dragons season
2012 NRL season	24	11	0	13	9/16						—	Steve Price	Ben Hornby		2012 St. George Illawarra Dragons season
2013 NRL season	24	7	0	17	14/16						—	Steve Price	Ben Creagh	Sign Josh Dugan	2013 St. George Illawarra Dragons season
2014 NRL season	24	11	0	13	11/16						Pool Stage	Price → McGregor	Ben Creagh	Sign Gareth Widdop, Benji Marshall	2014 St. George Illawarra Dragons season
2015 NRL season	24(1)	12	0	12(1)	8/16				X		Pool Stage	Paul McGregor	Ben Creagh	Made Top 8/ Finals for the first time since 2011	2015 St. George Illawarra Dragons season
2016 NRL season	24	10	0	14	11/16						Pool Stage	Paul McGregor	Gareth Widdop	Sign Tim Lafai, Tariq Sims	2016 St. George Illawarra Dragons season
2017 NRL season	24	12	0	12	9/16						Pool Stage	Paul McGregor	Gareth Widdop	Sign Paul Vaughan, Nene MacDonald, Cameron McInnes	2017 St. George Illawarra Dragons season
2018 NRL season	24(2)	15(1)	0	9(1)	7/16				X		—	Paul McGregor	Gareth Widdop	Sign Ben Hunt, James Graham	2018 St. George Illawarra Dragons season
2019 NRL season	24	8	0	16	15/16						—	Paul McGregor	Gareth Widdop	Sign Corey Norman, Korbin Sims	2019 St. George Illawarra Dragons season
2020 NRL season	20	7	0	13	12/16						—	McGregor → Young	Cameron McInnes	Sign Trent Merrin. McGregor resigns as coach	2020 St. George Illawarra Dragons season
2021 NRL season	24	8	0	16	11/16						—	Anthony Griffin	Ben Hunt	Sign Jack Bird, Andrew McCullough, Josh McGuire	2021 St. George Illawarra Dragons season
2022 NRL season	24	12	0	12	10/16						—	Anthony Griffin	Ben Hunt and Andrew McCullough	Sign Moses Mbye, Jayden Su'a, Aaron Woods	2022 St. George Illawarra Dragons season
2023 NRL season	24	5	0	19	16/17						—	Anthony Griffin → Ryan Carr	Ben Hunt, Jack de Belin, and Blake Lawrie	Sign Jacob Liddle, Ben Murdoch-Masila, Zane Musgrove	2023 St. George Illawarra Dragons season
2024 NRL season	24	11	0	13	11/17						—	Shane Flanagan	Ben Hunt and Jack de Belin	Sign Raymond Fatala-Mariner, Kyle Flanagan, Christian Tuipulotu	2024 St. George Illawarra Dragons season
2025 NRL season	24	8	0	16	15/17						—	Shane Flanagan	Clinton Gutherson, Damien Cook	Sign Damien Cook, Clinton Gutherson, Valentine Holmes	2025 St. George Illawarra Dragons season

=== Finals appearances ===
12 (1999, 2001, 2002, 2004, 2005, 2006, 2008, 2009, 2010, 2011, 2015, 2018)

== Current squad ==
St. George Illawarra Dragons 2026 squad
Top 30 squad - 2026 NRL season			Supplementary list	Coaching staff
Daniel Atkinson – HB, FE; Hayden Buchanan – CE; Damien Cook (c) – HK; Ryan Couchman – SR; Toby Couchman – PR; Dylan Egan – SR; David Fale – WG; Mat Feagai – CE; Kyle Flanagan – FE, HB; Emre Guler – PR	Clint Gutherson (c) – FB; Jacob Halangahu – SR; Valentine Holmes – CE; Josh Kerr – PR; Lyhkan King-Togia – FE; Blake Lawrie – PR; Nathan Lawson – WG; Luciano Leilua – SR; Jacob Liddle – HK; Loko Pasifiki Tonga – PR	Hame Sele – LK; Tyrell Sloan – FB; Hamish Stewart – LK; Jaydn Su'A – SR; Moses Suli – CE; Nick Tsougranis – SR, CE; Christian Tuipulotu – WG; Leeroy Weatherall – SR	Joseph O'Neill – HB, FE; Kade Reed – HB; Cyrus Stanley-Traill – PR; Setu Tu – WG; Extended squad: Isaiah Fagalilo – HK; Ryan Hutchinson – PR; Tyler Peckham-Harri – FB; Jacob Webster – PR	Head coach: Dean Young (Interim); Managers: Daniel Anderson (Head of Recruitment & Pathways); Legend: (c) Captain(s); (vc) Vice-captain(s); Updated: 22 November 2026; Source(s): Dragons team profiles

== Coaches ==
- David Waite 1999–2000
- Andrew Farrar 2000–2002
- Nathan Brown 2003–2008
- Wayne Bennett 2009–2011
- Steve Price 2012–2014
- Paul McGregor 2014–2020
- Dean Young 2020, 2026
- Anthony Griffin 2021–2023
- Ryan Carr 2023
- Shane Flanagan 2024–2026
- Dean Young (2026-present)

== Supporters ==
Many supporters of St. George Illawarra mainly come from the club's local areas, the suburbs of the St. George district in Sydney (the Bayside and Georges River Council regions), and the Illawarra on the south-coast of NSW. The St. George Illawarra Dragons also have a huge following in south-east Queensland, as a significant number of the club's 'Red V' memberships are from people in this area. The St. George Illawarra club also have a large number of supporters from all over New South Wales. At the end of the 2023 NRL season, the club recorded 19,965 members which was significantly higher than both Manly and Cronulla but lower than the remaining six Sydney teams. A fan run podcast, called the Red V Podcast was launched in January 2020. Discussing the latest news, match previews and reviews, talking with current and former players and giving fans a voice. The podcast is hosted by lifelong Dragons fan Jack Clifton and Curtis Woodward.

=== Notable supporters ===
Notable Dragons Supporters
Bryan Brown, actor; Billy Dib, boxer; Jihad Dib, politician; Sally Fitzgibbons, professional surfer; Mick Fuller, NSW Police commissioner; Dave Gleeson, lead singer of The Screaming Jets and The Angels; Geoff Harvey, musician; Moises Henriques, captain of Sydney Sixers; John Hewson, former Liberal Party of Australia leader; John Howard, 25th Prime Minister of Australia; Morris Iemma, 40th Premier of New South Wales; Stephen Jones, politician; Matthew Jurman, professional soccer player for Newcastle Jets FC; Neel Kolhatkar, comedian; Mark Latham, politician; Brett Lee, former Australian national cricker; Stephanie Magiros, snowboarder; Robert McClelland, politician; Ian McNamara, radio personality	Matt Moran, celebrity chef; Drew Morphett, sports broadcaster; David Morrow, former rugby league, sports commentator; Kerry O'Keeffe, former cricketer and Fox Cricket host; Marise Payne, former Minister for Foreign Affairs; Graham Perrett, politician; Melissa Perrine, para-alpine skier; Lara Pitt, TV host for Fox League; Graham Richardson, politician; Ken Rosewall, Grand Slam winning tennis player; Bob Simpson, cricketer; Tony Squires, TV host; John Stanley, talkback radio broadcaster for 2GB; Mitchell Starc, bowler for the Australian national cricket team; Mark Taylor, former captain of the Australian national cricket team; Barrie Unsworth, 36th Premier of New South Wales; Dana White, UFC President and CEO; Alexander Volkanovski, mixed martial arts fighter in the UFC; Jean-Claude Bitar, Social media influencer

== Rivalries ==
Due to St. George enjoying great success over the years, St. George Illawarra have inherited several fierce rivalries, while also creating a few new ones since forming the joint venture.

=== Canterbury-Bankstown Bulldogs ===
St. George Illawarra has a fierce rivalry with neighbour the Canterbury-Bankstown Bulldogs. Canterbury-Bankstown were founded in 1935, 14 years after St. George. St. George inflicted a RL record 91–6 defeat of Canterbury in 1935 but Canterbury enjoyed premiership success first, however St. George recorded 11 straight premierships in the years following (1956–1966).

In the 1942 NSWRFL season, the two clubs met in the 1942 grand final with Canterbury-Bankstown defeating St. George 11–9 in a low-scoring affair at the Sydney Cricket Ground.

It was also Canterbury-Bankstown who put an end to their Premiership run in 1967, when Canterbury beat them by one point in the preliminary final to face South Sydney in the Grand Final. Since then, both clubs have inflicted Premiership defeats on the other, St George defeating Canterbury-Bankstown in 1979, Canterbury returning the favour in 1985.

The two teams subsequently met in the 1993 preliminary final which St. George won 27–12. They would meet again in the 1995 and 1998 finals series with Canterbury running out winners on both occasions. The elimination final in 1998 was also St. George's final game as a stand-alone entity as the club elected to form a joint venture with Illawarra for the 1999 NRL season.

Since St. George formed a joint venture with Illawarra, the two clubs have met each other in the 2001 finals series which St. George Illawarra defeated Canterbury 23-22 and in the 2015 finals series which Canterbury won 11–10 at ANZ Stadium. In the 2017 NRL season, St. George Illawarra needed to beat Canterbury in the final game of the regular season to qualify for the finals. Canterbury who were already out of contention for the finals defeated St. George 26–20 which allowed North Queensland to get the last finals spot and finish 8th. North Queensland would then go on to reach the 2017 NRL Grand Final as a result.

The two sides are rivals in the NRL Heritage Round. Canterbury and St. George Illawarra also unofficially have a territorial rivalry, with fans from both teams coming in large amounts around Arncliffe, Earlwood, Kingsgrove, Marrickville, and Panania.

=== Parramatta Eels ===
The St. George Illawarra Dragons and Parramatta Eels had a competitive rivalry that stretched back to 1977, when the St. George Dragons and Parramatta played out the first ever drawn Grand Final result. Parramatta, seeking their first minor premiership after they finished the season on the top of the ladder at the end of the regular season, were beaten 22–0 in the Grand Final Rematch by St. George, who won their first Grand Final since 1966.

There were many controversial matches between St. George Illawarra and Parramatta. Firstly, in round 18 of the 2005 NRL season, Parramatta won 40–14 in a match which saw Trent Barrett and PJ Marsh trade blows after Marsh's crude charge-down attempt at Barrett, sparking an all-in brawl whilst Parramatta's Wade McKinnon sprinted to score a match-turning 80 metre try.

A less memorable match saw no points scored between the two teams in round 13 2006 in the first 70 minutes of play before Parramatta slotted a field goal with nine minutes remaining, before St. George Illawarra struck back with two one-pointers to take a 2–1 lead. St. George Illawarra then scored a try through Matt Cooper with mere seconds remaining to claim an 8–1 victory.

In the 2009 NRL finals series, St. George Illawarra finished as the Minor Premiership and faced the Parramatta Eels who finished 8th on the ladder. A week earlier at the same venue, St. George Illawarra had defeated Parramatta 37–0 but in the finals game, Parramatta won 25–12 with Parramatta player Jarryd Hayne scoring a brilliant solo try. As of the 2026 NRL season, this has been the last time where St. George Illawarra and Parramatta have met in a finals series.

=== Cronulla-Sutherland Sharks ===
St. George Illawarra's fiercest rivalries is with their Southern neighbor, Cronulla-Sutherland Sharks. Cronulla-Sutherland originally were part of the St. George juniors area, and Cronulla are often referred to as St George's "little brother". In Cronulla's foundation year, the club was coached by Ken Kearney who won several premierships with St. George as a player-coach in the 1950s and early 1960s. Cronulla's inaugural captain was also a former St. George premiership winning player in Monty Porter. In 1978, former St. George player and rugby league immortal Norm Provan coached Cronulla to the grand final and replay that season against Manly.

St. George Illawarra have had the same amount of success as the Cronulla-Sutherland Sharks, who have also won one premiership. In fact, since St. George Illawarra entered the competition in 1999, both the Saints and Cronulla have finished higher than the other six times apiece.

Cronulla finished the 1999 season as minor premiers, but St. George Illawarra beat them 26–8 in the preliminary final to progress to the 1999 NRL Grand Final at the Sharks' expense. The Saints trailed 0–8 at halftime.

Both clubs have been accused of poaching players from the other, and compete for fans in the same region. In 1999, the Cronulla CEO infamously cut up a St. George Jersey after a match at Toyota Stadium. During the Super League war, Cronulla-Sutherland was one of only three Sydney teams to join the rival competition, entrenching further spite from both the St. George Dragons and the Illawarra Steelers were loyal to the ARL during the Super League War.

In the 2002 finals series, both teams met in the semi-final which Cronulla won 40–24 at the Sydney Football Stadium. The rivalry increased further in 2005 when they met in a qualifying final at a sold out WIN Stadium with the Dragons winning 28–22. As of the 2022 NRL season, this is the last time the two club's have played each other in a finals game.

In 2009, former Dragons captain Trent Barrett switched to Cronulla-Sutherland after two years in the Super League. In his return match to Kogarah in round 3, 2009, Barrett was injured and with him went any hopes Cronulla had of winning the premiership (in the preceding year, the Cronulla club had finished equal-first) that year. Other players to have switched clubs include Lance Thompson and Jeremy Smith (St. George Illawarra to Cronulla), Beau Scott, Sam Isemonger and Matt Bickerstaff (Cronulla to St. George Illawarra) and Colin Best (Cronulla to St. George Illawarra) and then back again, as of 2011. In another match in 2009, Cronulla captain Paul Gallen was found guilty of a racial slur involving then Dragons forward Mickey Paea. In round 18 of the 2023 NRL season, St. George Illawarra recorded their worst ever loss to Cronulla as either St. George or St. George Illawarra with the match finishing 52–16.

=== South Sydney Rabbitohs ===
Charity Shield logo

St. George won 15 premierships before forming a joint-venture with Illawarra. In 2010, they won their first NRL premiership as a joint-venture. South Sydney have won the most premierships with 21, the Sydney Roosters next on 15 premierships. South Sydney and St. George have met several times in grand finals prior to the joint-venture and being the north-eastern neighbours of St. George, had many fierce encounters. One of the biggest matches in this rivalry is the Charity Shield, a pre-season fixture between the two sides that was abandoned after the 1999 match but was revived after Souths were re-admitted to the NRL in 2002.

In 2001, South Sydney chairman and club legend George Piggins said there would be no chance of the Charity Shield being revived if Souths were to be included back into the NRL saying "The Dragons: They sold us out". This was in reference to St. George signing an affidavit at the time which included that it would be detrimental if Souths were returned to the competition.

In 2018, both sides met for the first time in a finals match since 1984. After 80 tense minutes of absorbing action, Souths won a close semi-final 13–12.

=== Sydney Roosters ===
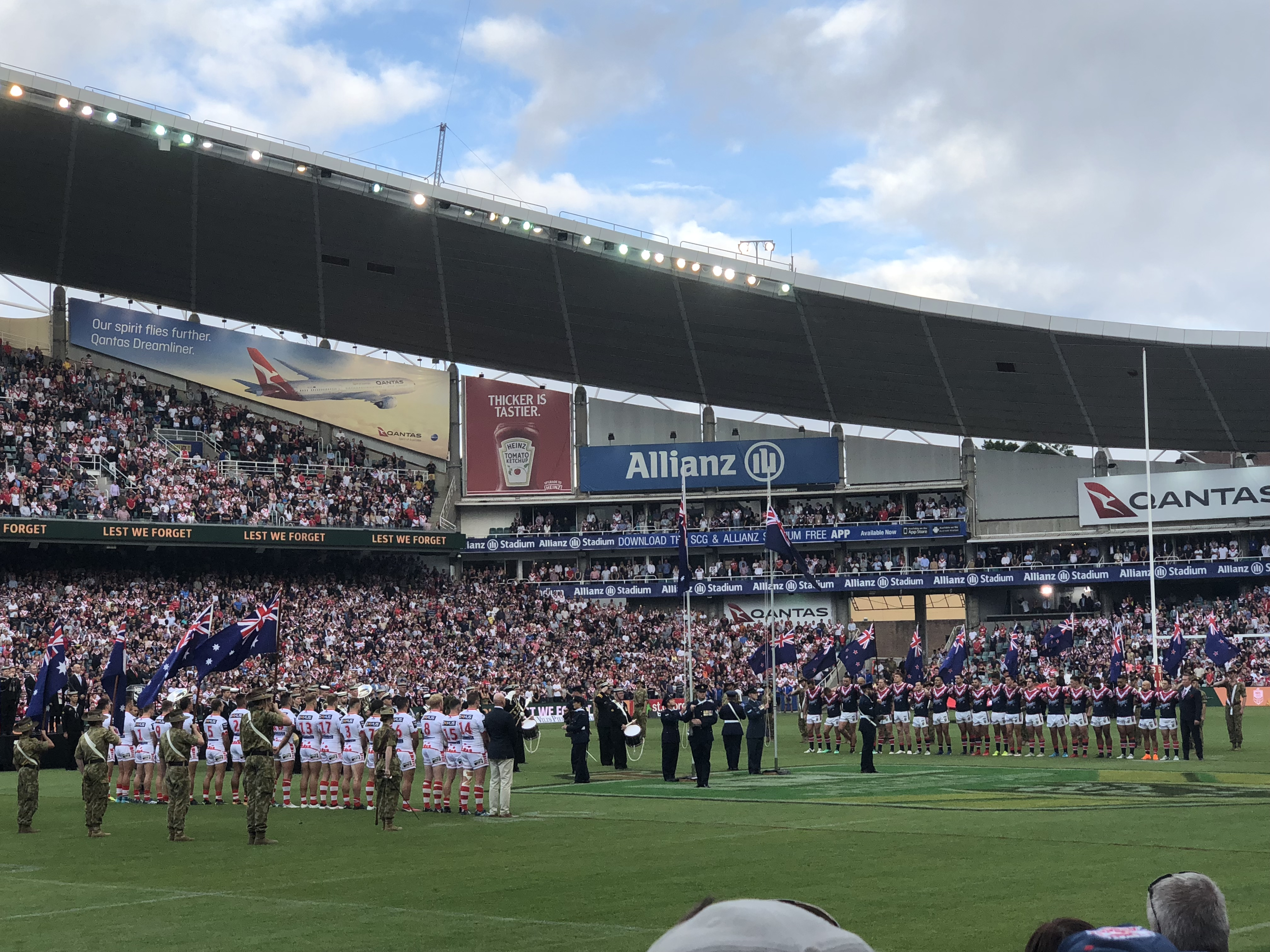
The pre-match formalities taking place prior to the 2018 Anzac Day clash between the two clubs.

St. George has another fierce rivalry with the Sydney Roosters. St. George's first premiership was a 31–14 victory over Easts in the 1941 NSWRFL season Grand Final.

In 1960 Eastern Suburbs reached their first grand final since 1945 where they faced St. George but were beaten 31–6.

In 1975 Eastern Suburbs defeated St. George 38–0 in the grand final which until the 2008 NRL season was the biggest winning margin in a grand final.

During 1995, in the midst of the Super League War, Eastern Suburbs had secret discussions to merge with the St. George club, with St. George's jersey and emblem to disappear. Fans of both clubs were outraged, and the attempt aborted. St. George Illawarra annually contests the Club ANZAC Game against the Sydney Roosters, a tradition dating back to the 1970s, and contested annually since 2002.

After St. George formed a joint venture with the Illawarra Steelers in 1999 to form St. George Illawarra the two clubs have met each other twice in finals matches, the first coming in 1999 which St. George Illawarra won and in the 2010 NRL Grand Final where St. George Illawarra won its first premiership as a joint venture defeating the Sydney Roosters 32–8 at ANZ Stadium.

== Encounters with other teams ==
=== Brisbane Broncos ===
Prior to the joint-venture, both St George and Illawarra had memorable matches with Brisbane in the early 1990s. St. George and Brisbane Broncos contested the 1992 and 1993 Grand Finals, creating a competitive rivalry (see New South Wales Rugby League season 1993). Also, Illawarra had produced some memorable performances against Brisbane, including the infamous 1989 Panasonic Cup Final (which Brisbane won) and the 1992 Tooheys Challenge Cup Final (won by Illawarra).

The St. George Illawarra Dragons had the longest winning streak against the Brisbane Broncos than any other club (eight, from round 23, 2005 to round 4, 2009 inclusive, including one final in 2006), across five years. With former Brisbane Broncos coach Wayne Bennett at the helm of St George Illawarra, and Wendell Sailor, a popular face in the NRL and a former Bronco, the rivalry only increased. In 2009, the Dragons defeated the Broncos at Suncorp Stadium early, and were then beaten in Wollongong by the Broncos later on in the season. One game a piece, the two sides met up in Brisbane in the finals, where they lost to the Broncos 24–10, thus ending the Dragons season and also that of Wendell Sailor's career. Ironically, his first and last games for the Dragons were both against the Brisbane side.

Some memorable matches between the Dragons and Brisbane have included:

- Round 11, 2002: Brisbane were at the top of the ladder undefeated at the time until they ran into the Dragons at Aussie Stadium on a sunny Sunday afternoon. The Dragons won 28–20 to inflict Brisbane's first defeat of the season, but in round 17 the Broncos got them back with a 34–22 victory at ANZ Stadium.
- Round 26, 2003: St. George Illawarra were out of finals contention and the Broncos the previous week had lost a then club-record breaking sixth straight loss when the two teams came together at Suncorp Stadium in the final round of the 2003 season. The second-string Dragons side, without more than half of its first grade side stunned the Broncos 26–25 with hooker Mark Riddell kicking an improbable penalty goal with just over 90 seconds remaining. This condemned Brisbane to their seventh loss in succession and gave Dragons fans some hope for the 2004 season.
- Round 12, 2004: Not even an early try from Mark Gasnier (who was dropped from the New South Wales State of Origin team for disciplinary issues) could inspire St. George Illawarra as they lost by just two points, 24–22.
- Round 23, 2005: In a potential Grand Final preview, scores were locked at 0–0 for the majority of the first half before the Dragons broke away in the second half to record a 24–4 win and instigate Brisbane's then-traditional late-season poor form.
- Round 15, 2006: With the Dragons trailing 16–12 with two minutes remaining, Saints winger Brett Morris scored his first-ever first grade try in the corner in the dying minutes after catching a Mathew Head bomb. The try was allowed, leaving St. George Illawarra hooker Aaron Gorrell (in a twist of irony, he later went on to play for the Broncos) with the sideline conversion to win the game. Gorrell nailed it and Saints won the match 18–16.
- 2nd Qualifying Final, 2006: The Red V upset Brisbane 20–4, the third time St. George Illawarra defeated Brisbane in that year. Brisbane ultimately went on to win the premiership.
- Round 13, 2008: Wendell Sailor played his first game for the Dragons against the Brisbane club, but was rested just before halftime following a jaw injury suffered in the first half. Saints won the game 34–16.
- Round 23, 2008: Sailor marked his return to Suncorp Stadium with his first try since coming back to rugby league in a win to St. George Illawarra, 24–20.
- Round 4, 2009: Wayne Bennett, Darius Boyd and a host of others opposed the Broncos for the first time in their lives. Despite conceding an early try to Israel Folau, the Dragons won 25–12 with Wendell Sailor appropriately scoring the match winning try.
- 2nd Semi-Final, 2009: The Brisbane club ended St. George Illawarra's season with a 24–10 win, and the Dragons became the first minor premiers in 16 years to be eliminated in just the 2nd round of the Finals.
- 2nd Semi-Final, 2011: Brisbane beat St. George Illawarra 13–12 field goal kicked by Darren Lockyer in overtime, Darren won the game with a fractured cheekbone that he received late in the game, this also turned out to be Darren Lockyer's last game for the Broncos and Wayne Bennett (coaching) and Mark Gasnier's last for the Dragons.
- Round 1, 2018: In the season opener, Ben Hunt played his first game for St. George Illawarra after leaving Brisbane the year before, the Red V beat Brisbane 34–12 with Hunt scoring an intercept try off a poor pass from Broncos recruit Matt Lodge.
- 2nd Elimination Final, 2018: In their first finals meeting in seven years, Brisbane were widely tipped to beat St. George Illawarra, after an arm wrestle for most of the 1st half, the Dragons inspired by a Tariq Sims hat trick went on to hand the Broncos their worst finals loss at Suncorp winning 48–18 and eliminating Brisbane in the process. It was also Ben Hunt's first game in Brisbane since leaving Brisbane for St George Illawarra.
- Round 3, 2019: In their only meeting for 2019, both sides struggled to get the upper hand until former Brisbane player Corey Norman slotted a field goal right on full time to give the Red V a 25–24 win after Jamayne Isaako missed a field goal attempt only moments earlier.
- Round 25, 2022: St. George Illawarra were out of finals contention while Brisbane had to win to play finals. The Red V won the game 22–12 condemning the Brisbane club to a third consecutive year without a finals appearance which allowed the Canberra Raiders to advance into the finals at the expense of Brisbane.
- Round 13, 2026: St George Illawarra went into the match with a club record 15 game losing streak dating back to 2025, but upset the highly fancied Brisbane side 30–26 despite a late comeback attempt from Brisbane.

Players who played for the Dragons who have won premierships with Brisbane include Darius Boyd and Luke Priddis, who also won a premiership with Penrith in 2003. Others of note include Nick Emmett who was brought to the club by Wayne Bennett, and Neville Costigan, who was sacked just before the Broncos' 2006 success.

=== Melbourne Storm ===
These two teams played against each other in the 1999 NRL Grand Final. It is remembered for the penalty try conceded by St. George Illawarra winger Jamie Ainscough that cost the club the premiership. It was the club's first NRL Grand Final appearance as a joint-venture and Melbourne's first Grand Final appearance in just its second year in existence. St. George Illawarra had led 14–0 at halftime only for Melbourne to come back and claim a controversial 20–18 win following the penalty try two minutes from time.

The two teams have also had some memorable, not to mention controversial matches in the decade that followed, none more so than the Grand Final rematch in 2000 which saw Melbourne beat St. George Illawarra 70–10 at the MCG (this remains St George Illawarra's biggest defeat as a joint-venture to date).

In the lead up to that match, then-Saints five-eighth Anthony Mundine had claimed that the Melbourne club were not worthy premiers, sparking anger from Melbourne's fans and players, thus the catalyst for the huge win. St. George Illawarra however did claim revenge later that year with a 50–4 win at WIN Stadium (that also remains Melbourne's worst ever defeat to date).

The 2009 season opened with these two teams going head-to-head in another much talked about match. St. George Illawarra five-eighth Jamie Soward was labelled a 'rag doll' in defence whilst trying to stop Melbourne's Greg Inglis scoring a try, however ever since that match Soward's game has matured. The club lost 17–16 in extra time, with Inglis scoring the match winning field goal. In the return match, Soward was also the centre of attention as he used his foot to prevent Inglis again from scoring, resulting in an eight-point try and Soward being put on report (he was reprimanded for this). St. George Illawarra won this match 26–12. In round 4, 2010, St. George Illawarra were the last team to lose premiership points to Melbourne before their salary cap scandal was revealed.

St. George Illawarra were also involved in a controversial loss to Melbourne at the start of the 2014 season. In their round 6 game at AAMI Park, a refereeing and timekeeping error resulted in Melbourne scoring a try after the siren had gone, to win them the match. In the 80th minute, St. George Illawarra were ahead 24–22. The full-time siren sounded in the 80th minute, prior to a Melbourne player in possession being tackled. After the tackle was completed, the referees allowed play to continue, rather than ending the match, which gave Melbourne the chance to spread the ball in an elongated play, which resulted in a try and conversion in the 81st minute, giving them the win, 28–24.

In their only meeting in the 2024 season, St. George Illawarra defeated Melbourne as the away team for the first time since the 1999 Qualifying Final, breaking a 25-year losing streak over 17 matches in Victoria.

== Club records ==
(As of the end of the 2025 season)

=== Player records ===
**Most Games for the Dragons**

Player	Games
Ben Hornby	273
Ben Creagh	270
Jason Nightingale	266
Jack de Belin	252
Matt Cooper	243
Dean Young	209
Mark Gasnier	174
**Blake Lawrie**	169
Brett Morris	169
Tyson Frizell	165

**Most Points in a Season**

Player	Points	Games	Year	Tries	Goals	F/G
Jamie Soward	234	24	2009	12	90	6
Gareth Widdop	205	22	2018	4	94	1
Jamie Soward	197	26	2010	6	84	5
Gareth Widdop	191	21	2017	10	71	1
Zac Lomax	186	21	2024	14	63	2
Gareth Widdop	182	21	2015	9	73	0
Zac Lomax	178	20	2020	13	63	0
Zac Lomax	167	24	2022	6	71	1
Mark Riddell	166	24	2003	7	69	0
Wayne Bartrim	162	25	1999	5	79	0

**Most Points for the Dragons (300+ )**

Player	Points	Tries	Goals	F/G
Jamie Soward	977	39	398	25
Gareth Widdop	912	33	387	6
Zac Lomax	831	35	315	1
Mark Riddell	517	30	198	1
Matt Cooper	496	124	0	0
Brett Morris	448	112	0	0
Jason Nightingale	440	110	0	0
Nathan Blacklock	428	100	14	0
Mark Gasnier	420	92	26	0
Wayne Bartrim	374	8	171	0

**Top 10 Try Scorers**

Player	Tries	Games
Matt Cooper	124	243
Brett Morris	112	151
Jason Nightingale	110	266
Nathan Blacklock	100	114
Mark Gasnier	92	174
Mikaele Ravalawa	67	98
Tyrell Sloan	59	97
Ben Hornby	59	273
Ben Creagh	54	270
Zac Lomax	49	114

**Top 10 Goal Kickers**

Player	Goals
Jamie Soward	398
Gareth Widdop	387
Zac Lomax	315
Mark Riddell	198
Wayne Bartrim	171
Mathew Head	95
Aaron Gorrell	94
**Valentine Holmes**	82
Wes Naiqama	48
Michael Ennis	44

**Most Tries in a Season**

Player	Tries	Games	Year
Nathan Blacklock	27	28	2001
Brett Morris	25	24	2009
Nathan Blacklock	25	26	2000
Nathan Blacklock	24	26	1999
Mikaele Ravalawa	21	21	2023
Brett Morris	20	25	2010
Colin Best	20	26	2005
Mark Gasnier	18	23	2006
Lee Hookey	18	25	2002
Matt Cooper	17	23	2004
Anthony Mundine	17	23	1999
Tyrell Sloan	17	20	2025

**Top 10 Most Points in a Match**

Player	Points	Tries	Goals	F/G
Zac Lomax	32	3	10	0
Gareth Widdop	22	1	9	0
Gareth Widdop	22	2	7	0
Amos Roberts	22	1	9	0
Jamie Soward	22	1	9	0
Gareth Widdop	22	1	9	0
Zac Lomax	22	2	7	0
Jamie Soward	21	2	6	1
Gareth Widdop	20	1	8	0
Aaron Gorrell	20	1	8	0

- **Bold – Active**

== Head-to-head records ==
Opponent	Played	Won	Drawn	Lost	Win %
Knights	45	30	0	15	66.67
Warriors	39	25	0	14	64.10
Titans	33	21	0	12	63.64
Sea Eagles	39	24	0	15	61.54
Tigers	47	25	0	22	53.19
Panthers	41	21	0	20	52.50
Rabbitohs	44	22	0	22	50.00
Broncos	47	22	0	25	46.81
Sharks	56	24	1	31	42.85
Roosters	53	22	1	30	41.51
Cowboys	41	17	0	24	41.46
Eels	44	18	2	24	40.90
Dolphins	5	2	0	3	40.00
Bulldogs	49	17	0	32	34.69
Raiders	41	14	1	26	34.15
Storm	44	13	1	30	29.55

Since the foundation of the St. George Illawarra Dragons, the club has achieved the following Win/Loss Record:

Games	Wins	Drawn	Loss	Points For	Points Against	±	Win %
580	287	6	287	12,216	11,593	+623	49.48

Biggest winning margins

Margin	Score	Opponent	Venue	Date
54	54–0	Auckland Warriors	WIN Stadium	6 May 2000
50	50–0	Wests Tigers	Jubilee Oval	20 June 2004
46	50–4	Melbourne Storm	WIN Stadium	4 June 2000
46	54–8	Gold Coast Titans	Clive Berghofer Stadium	25 March 2018
46	48–2	Newcastle Knights	WIN Stadium	4 April 2004
42	58–16	Canberra Raiders	WIN Stadium	8 April 2007
42	56–14	Wests Tigers	WIN Stadium	7 June 2024
42	44-2	Canberra Raiders	Jubilee Stadium	18 April 1999
42	58-16	South Sydney Rabbitohs	WIN Stadium	18 August 2002
40	48-8	Balmain Tigers	WIN Stadium	22 May 1999
40	52-12	South Sydney Rabbitohs	SCG	27 June 2004

Most consecutive wins

- 9 – (27 March 2011 – 29 May 2011)
- 8 – (17 July 2005 – 10 September 2005)
- 7 – (17 May 2008 – 5 July 2008)
- 7 – (14 June 2009 – 7 August 2009)

Biggest comeback

- 24-points – Trailed Manly Sea Eagles 34–10 after 57 minutes to win 36–34 at Jubilee Stadium (19 August 2004)

Biggest losing margins

Margin	Score	Opponent	Venue	Date
60	10–70	Melbourne Storm	MCG	3 March 2000
50	6–56	Dolphins	Suncorp Stadium	6 June 2025
48	6–54	Newcastle Knights	WIN Stadium	8 April 2006
46	4–50	North Queensland Cowboys	Dairy Farmers Stadium	29 April 2000
46	16–62	Sydney Roosters	Allianz Stadium	25 April 2026
40	0–40	South Sydney Rabbitohs	Accor Stadium	21 August 2025
38	0–38	Canterbury-Bankstown Bulldogs	Jubilee Oval	26 August 2018
36	6-42	Melbourne Storm	AAMI Park	8 May 2022
36	14-50	South Sydney Rabbitohs	Suncorp Stadium	1 August 2021
36	0–36	Parramatta Eels	Parramatta Stadium	17 May 2014

Most consecutive losses

- 15* – (15 August 2025 – present)
- 8 – (16 July 2021 – 4 September 2021)
- 7 – (8 June 2015 – 2 August 2015)
- 6 – (9 April 2023 - 13 May 2023)
- 6 – (29 July 2023 - 2 September 2023)
- 6 – (27 July 2013 – 2 September 2013)
- 5 – (4 July 2019 - 4 August 2019)
- 5 – (5 September 2004 – 2 April 2005)
- 5 – (14 July – 13 August 2006)
- 5 – (23 March – 30 April 2007)

Worst collapse

- 20-points – Led South Sydney Rabbitohs 20–0 after 35 minutes to lose 34–24 at WIN Stadium (31 July 2011)

== Women's team ==
Members of the NRL Women's team assembling outside Jubilee Oval during a promotional appearance in August 2018.

In December 2017, the St. George Illawarra Dragons expressed their interest in applying for a licence to participate in the inaugural NRL Women's season. In March 2018, they were awarded one of four licences for the league's inaugural season, to commence in September of the same year. Daniel Lacey was appointed to coach the side.

In June 2018, Sam Bremner, Kezie Apps and Talesha Quinn were unveiled as the club's first three signings.

=== Current squad ===
St George Illawarra Dragons NRLW Squad
2026 NRLW		Coaching staff
Brooke Anderson – LK, HK; Charlotte Basham – SR; Teagan Berry – FB, WG; Indie Bostock – CE; Keele Browne – CE, WG; Montana Clifford – SR; Tyra Ekepati – CE, WG; Taliah Fuimaono – FE	Zali Hopkins (c) – FE, HK; Montaya Hudson – FB; Ahlivia Ingram – PR; Lavinia Kitai – PR; Ella Koster – SR; Nita Maynard-Perrin – HK; Jayme Millard – WG, CE; Maria Paseka – WG	Legend: (c) Captain(s); (vc) Vice-captain(s); Updated: 5 July 2025; Source(s): St George Illawarra

=== Season summaries ===
Competition	Games Played (FINALS)	Games Won (FINALS)	Games Drawn (FINALS)	Games Lost (FINALS)	Ladder Position	P	R	M	F	W	NRL Nines	Coach	Captain	Notes	
2018 NRL Women's season	3	1	0	2	4/4						—	Daniel Lacey	Sam Bremner, |Kezie Apps	4th (Last)	
2019 NRL Women's season	3(1)	2	0	1(1)	2/4		X		X			Daniel Lacey	Sam Bremner, |Kezie Apps	Runners Up	
2020 NRL Women's season	3	0	0	3	4/4	X	X	X	X	X	Winners	Daniel Lacey	Sam Bremner, |Kezie Apps		4th (Last)
2021 NRL Women's season	5(2)	5(2)	0	1(1)	2/6		X	X	X		—	Jamie Soward	Kezie Apps, Keeley Davis	Runners Up	
2022 NRL Women's season	5(1)	3(1)	0	2(1)	3/6		X	X	X		—	Jamie Soward	Kezie Apps, Keeley Davis , Holli Wheeler	Semi Finalists	
2023 NRL Women's season	9(0)	3(0)	0	6(0)	7/10		X	X	X		—	Jamie Soward	Raecene McGregor	7th	
2024 NRL Women's season	9(0)	2(0)	0	8(0)	9/10		X	X	X		—	Jamie Soward	Raecene McGregor	9th	
2025 NRL Women's season	11(0)	3(0)	0	8(1)	10/12		X	X	X		—	Nathan Cross	Raecene McGregor, Zali Hopkins	10th	

== See also ==
- Illawarra Steelers
- St. George Dragons
