= Jacob Halangahu =

Australian rugby league footballer

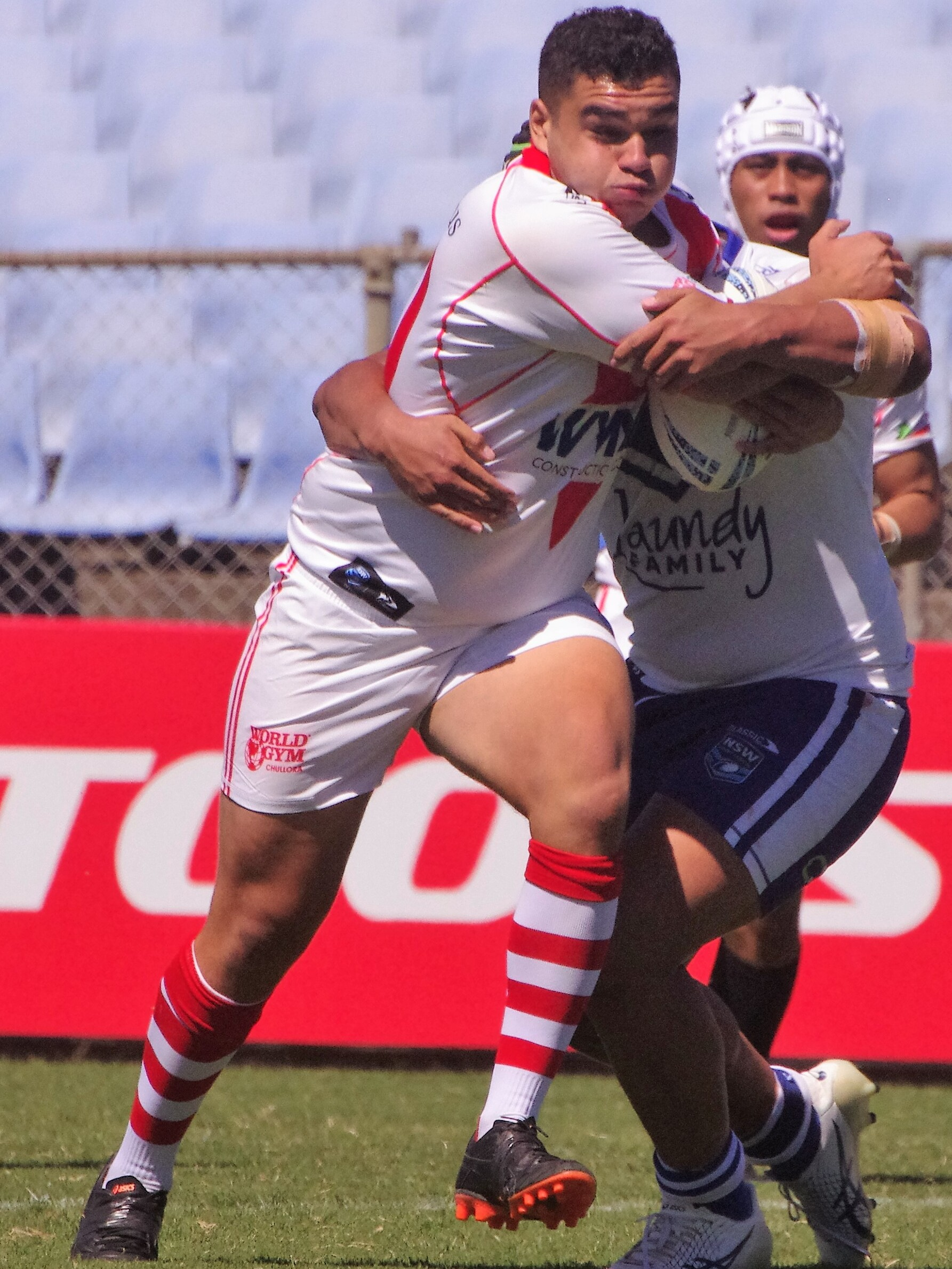

Personal information
- Full name: Jacob Halangahu
- Born: 26 August 2006 (age 19) Penrith, New South Wales, Australia
- Height: 185 cm (6 ft 1 in)
- Weight: 112 kg (17 st 9 lb)

Playing information
- Position: Second-row, Prop
Club
Years	Team	Pld	T	G	FG	P
2025–	St. George Illawarra	16	0	0	0	0
- Source: As of 25 August 2026

Jacob Halangahu (born 26 August 2006) is an Australian professional rugby league footballer who plays as a second-row forward for the St. George Illawarra Dragons in the National Rugby League.

== Background ==
Halangahu attended both St.Dominic’s College, Penrith and Patrician Brothers Blacktown, captaining both schools. He was named for the 2024 Australian Schoolboys team as captain and was selected for NSW U19's Origin team starting at Second-Row. Halangahu came through the junior system for St. George Illawarra, being involved in the Dragons first SG Ball title in 30 years.

== 2025 ==
In Round 23 of the 2025 NRL season, Halangahu made his NRL debut for St. George Illawarra against the Cronulla Sharks, coming off the bench in a 22–14 win at Netstrata Stadium.

== 2026 ==
On 6 August 2026, St. George Illawarra announced that Halangahu had re-signed with the club until the end of 2029.
