= Jacob Webster =

Australian rugby league footballer (born 2003)

Personal information
- Full name: Jacob Webster
- Born: 17 April 2003 (age 23)

Playing information
- Position: Prop, Lock
Club
Years	Team	Pld	T	G	FG	P
2026–	St. George Illawarra	5	0	0	0	0
- Source: RLP

Jacob Webster (born 17 April 2003) is an Australian rugby league footballer for the St. George Illawarra Dragons in the National Rugby League (NRL).

Hailing from Kempsey, New South Wales, Webster joined the Illawarra Steelers from the Kempsey Dragons as a teenager and got his start in the Harold Matthews Cup.

Webster gained representative honours in 2022 with the NSW under-19s State of Origin team and made his NSW Cup debut that year for the Dragons, but wasn't a regular fixture until 2025.

A prop and lock forward, Webster broke into first-grade in the 2026 NRL season, featuring off the bench in the final five rounds. He subsequently signed a contract extension for a further two seasons.
