= David Fale =

New Zealand rugby league footballer

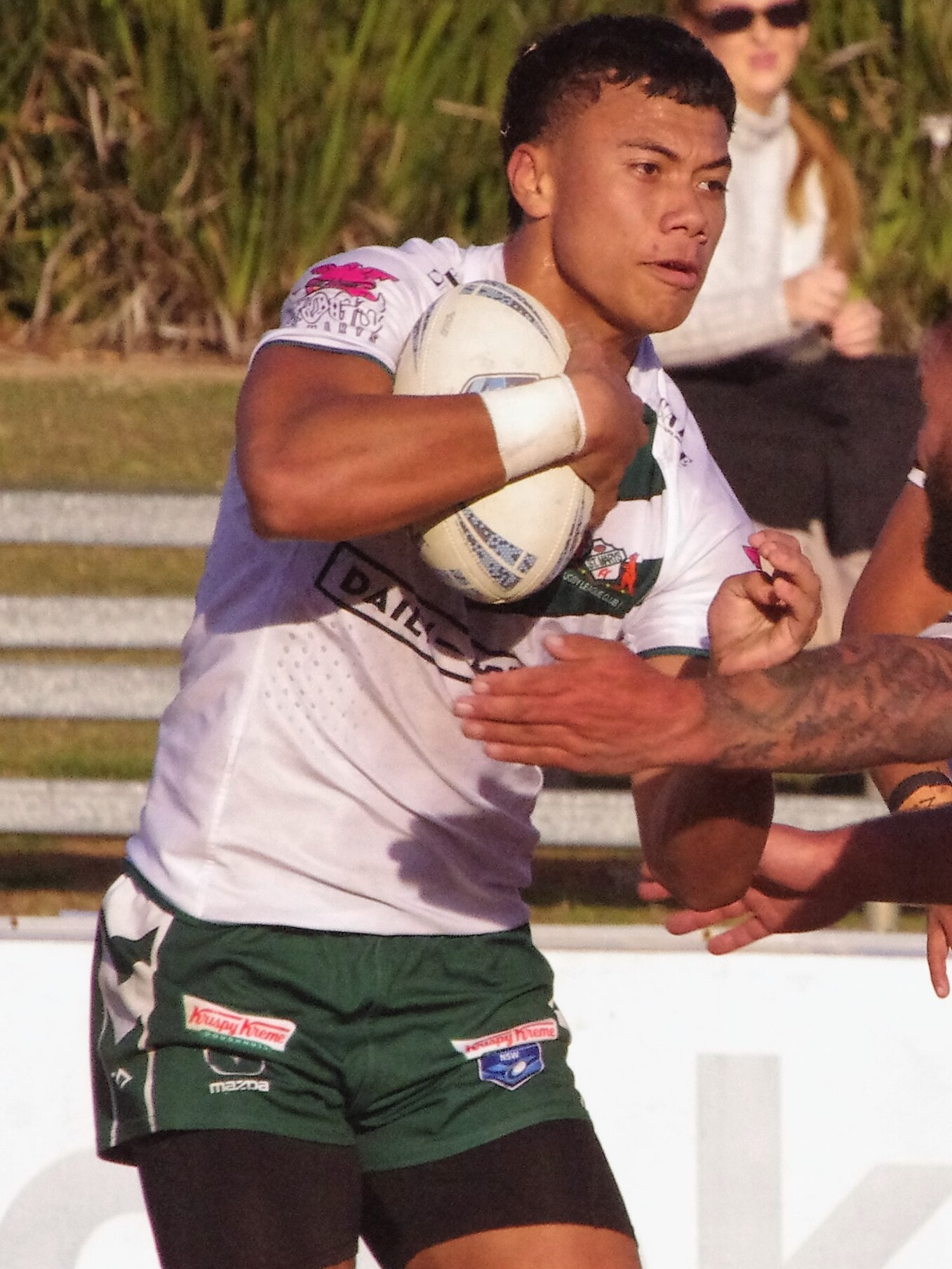

Personal information
- Full name: David Fale
- Born: 12 July 2000 (age 26) Auckland, New Zealand
- Height: 190 cm (6 ft 3 in)
- Weight: 100 kg (15 st 10 lb)

Playing information
- Position: Centre, Wing
Club
Years	Team	Pld	T	G	FG	P
2025	Penrith Panthers	1	0	0	0	0
2026–	St. George Illawarra	2	0	0	0	0
	Total	3	0	0	0	0
- Source: As of 20 November 2026

David Fale is a New Zealand professional rugby league footballer who plays as a centre or winger for the St. George Illawarra Dragons in the National Rugby League.

== Background ==
Fale spent some time at the Canberra Raiders before moving to play for St. Mary's in Sydney Shield and Ron Massey Cup. Fale then played for the Penrith Panthers in NSW Cup.

== Career ==
In round 26 2025, Fale made his NRL debut for Penrith against the Canterbury-Bankstown Bulldogs. He played Centre in a 28–4 loss at Accor Stadium.
