= Loko Pasifiki Tonga =

New Zealand rugby league footballer

Personal information
- Full name: Loko Pasifiki Tonga
- Born: 18 May 2005 (age 21) Auckland, New Zealand
- Height: 196 cm (6 ft 5 in)
- Weight: 116 kg (18 st 4 lb)

Playing information
- Position: Prop
Club
Years	Team	Pld	T	G	FG	P
2025–	St. George Illawarra	28	1	0	0	4
- Source: As of 6 November 2026

Loko Pasifiki Tonga (born 17 February 2005) is a New Zealand professional rugby league footballer who plays as a prop forward for the St. George Illawarra Dragons in the National Rugby League.

== Background ==
Pasifiki Tonga played his junior football for the Chester Hill Hornets and Bankstown Bulls. He studied at Keebra Park then moving to Melbourne playing Rugby Union, before signing with the St. George Illawarra Dragons. He played through Harold Matthews and SG Ball with the Dragons, being selected in the New South Wales under 19's team and Australian Schoolboys in 2023 and 2024.

== Career ==
=== 2025 ===
In round 10 2025, Pasifiki Tonga made his NRL debut for the Dragons against the New Zealand Warriors, coming off the bench in a 15-14 loss at WIN Stadium. Pasifiki Tonga later re-signed with St. George Illawarra until the end of 2026. In April 2026, Pasifiki Tonga requested a release from the club amid reports he was unhappy with not getting enough game time and also his relationship with then head coach Shane Flanagan. Following Flanagan's sacking, Pasifiki Tonga withdrew the transfer request.

=== 2026 ===
On 5 August 2026, St. George Illawarra announced that Pasifiki Tonga had re-signed with the club until the end of 2029. He played 17 matches for St. George Illawarra in the 2026 NRL season as the club finished with the Wooden Spoon.
