= Nick Tsougranis =

Australian rugby league footballer

Personal information
- Full name: Nicholas Tsougranis
- Born: 16 July 2004 (age 22) Kogarah, New South Wales, Australia
- Height: 184 cm (6 ft 0 in)
- Weight: 100 kg (15 st 10 lb)

Playing information
- Position: Second-row, Centre
Club
Years	Team	Pld	T	G	FG	P
2025–	St. George Illawarra	1	0	0	0	0
- Source: As of 18 August 2026

Nick Tsougranis (born 16 July 2004) is an Australian professional rugby league footballer who plays as a second-row forward and centre for the St. George Illawarra Dragons in the National Rugby League (NRL).

== Early life ==
An Arncliffe Scots junior, Tsougranis was born and raised in the St George area of Sydney. He progressed through the Dragons’ development pathways, captaining the Harold Matthews and SG Ball sides before debuting in Jersey Flegg in 2022.

== Playing career ==
=== NSW Cup ===
Tsougranis made his NSW Cup debut in June 2023 and by mid‑2025 had recorded 24 appearances and seven tries, showcasing his defensive consistency (90.5% tackle efficiency) and running strength with over 1,800 metres for the season.

=== Playing career ===
Tsougranis made his first grade debut in Round 15 of the 2025 NRL season, coming off the bench at centre in a 30–18 loss to arch-rivals the Cronulla-Sutherland Sharks at Shark Park. On 28 September 2025, he played in St. George Illawarra's 30-12 NSW Cup Grand Final loss to New Zealand.

== Personal life ==
Of Greek heritage, Tsougranis has expressed pride in representing his cultural background on-field.
