= Hayden Buchanan =

Australian rugby league footballer

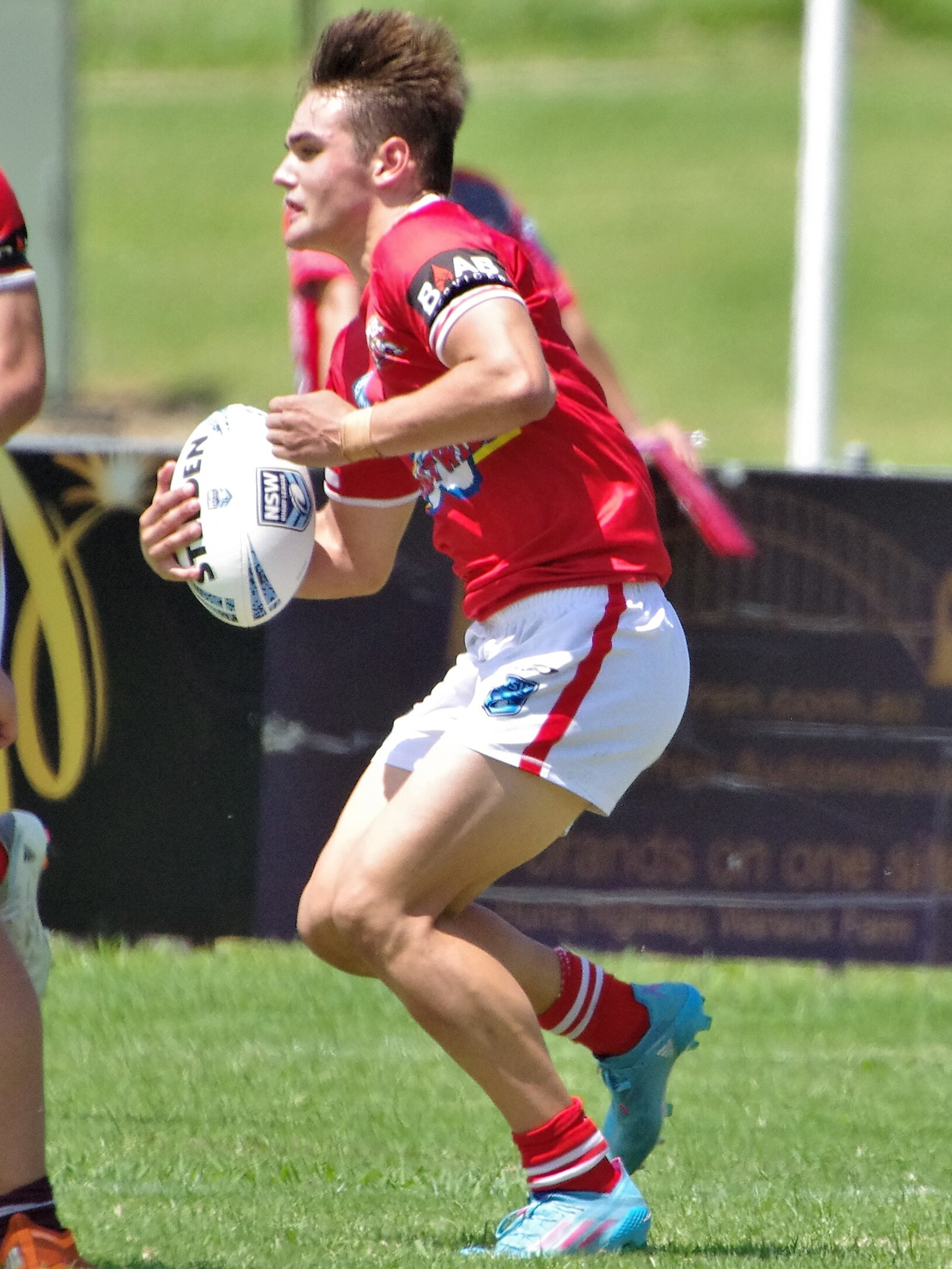

Personal information
- Full name: Hayden Buchanan
- Born: 6 January 2006 (age 20) Hurstville, New South Wales, Australia
- Height: 179 cm (5 ft 10 in)
- Weight: 88 kg (13 st 12 lb)

Playing information
- Position: Centre
Club
Years	Team	Pld	T	G	FG	P
2025–	St. George Illawarra	8	1	0	0	4
- Source: As of 24 October 2026

Hayden Buchanan (born 6 January 2006) is an Australian professional rugby league footballer who plays as a Centre for the St. George Illawarra Dragons in the National Rugby League (NRL).

== Background ==
Buchanan attended Kiama High School, being selected for the 2023 Australian Schoolboys team.

== Career ==
In round 23 2025, Buchanan made his NRL debut for the Dragons against the Cronulla Sharks at Jubilee Stadium, playing Centre and scoring a try in a 22–14 win.
