= Dean Young (rugby league) =

Australian RL coach & footballer

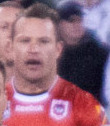

Personal information
- Full name: Dean Craig Young
- Born: 28 October 1983 (age 43) Sydney, New South Wales, Australia
- Height: 184 cm (6 ft 0 in)
- Weight: 99 kg (15 st 8 lb)

Playing information
- Position: Hooker, Lock, Second-row
Club
Years	Team	Pld	T	G	FG	P
2003–12	St. George Illawarra	209	20	0	0	80
Representative
Years	Team	Pld	T	G	FG	P
2010	Australia	1	0	0	0	0
2010	Country Origin	1	2	0	0	8
2011	New South Wales	1	0	0	0	0

Coaching information
Club
Years	Team	Gms	W	D	L	W%
2020	St. George Illawarra	6	2	0	4	33
2026–	St. George Illawarra	17	5	0	12	29
Representative
Years	Team	Gms	W	D	L	W%
2022	Tonga	1	0	0	1	0
- Source: As of 6 November 2026
- Education: Dapto High School
- Father: Craig Young

Dean Young (born 28 October 1983) is an Australian professional rugby league coach who is the head coach of the St George Illawarra Dragons in the National Rugby League (NRL) and a former professional rugby league footballer who played in the 2000s and 2010s.

Primarily a hooker or lock, Young spent his entire playing career for the St. George Illawarra Dragons, winning a premiership with them in 2010, and represented Australia and New South Wales. In 2020, he was interim head coach of the Dragons and in 2021, caretaker coach of the Cowboys for one game due to Todd Payten's forced absence.

== Background ==
Born in Sydney, New South Wales, Young played his junior rugby league for the Dapto Canaries and attended Dapto High School before being signed by the St. George Illawarra Dragons.

Young's father, Craig, played 234 games for the St. George Dragons, winning two premierships, and represented Australia and New South Wales.

== Playing career ==
In 2000, Young represented the New South Wales under-17 team while playing in the lower grades for the Illawarra Steelers.

In Round 2 of the 2003 NRL season, Young made his debut for the Dragons against the Parramatta Eels. He became a regular of the Dragons NRL side following his debut, playing at either lock, hooker or second row. In 2006, Young was selected as 18th man for New South Wales in the 2006 State of Origin decider in Melbourne, but did not play.

In 2007, Young played just three NRL games, missing the majority of the season due to a knee injury incurred in 2006 from a Lance Thompson tackle. His recovery was further hindered by complications from surgery which was performed to address this injury. In Round 3 of the 2008 NRL season, Young played his 100th NRL game in a 14–21 loss to the Canberra Raiders.

In July 2009, Young signed a three-year contract with the Dragons.

In May 2010, Young was selected to represent Country in the annual City vs Country Origin game, scoring two tries in Country's first victory since 2006. On 3 October 2010, Young started at hooker and scored a try in the Dragons' 32–8 Grand Final win over the Sydney Roosters. In November 2010, Young was selected in the Australian squad for the Four Nations, making his Test debut in a 34–20 win over New Zealand.

In 2011, Young represented New South Wales for the first time, starting at hooker in their 12–16 Game I loss to Queensland.

On 10 April 2012, Young announced that he would retire at the end of the 2012 NRL season. In Round 15 of the 2012 season, Young played his 200th NRL game in a 20–28 loss to the Canterbury-Bankstown Bulldogs.

== Coaching career ==
In 2013, Young coached the Illawarra Steelers SG Ball Cup side. In 2014, Young and former teammate Ben Hornby were named co-coaches of the Dragons' under-20s team. They finished 4th and made it to the preliminary finals.

In 2015, Young became an assistant coach for the Dragons' NRL side, under head coach Paul McGregor. In 2019, Young worked as an assistant coach for the Tongan national team. In February 2020, he was an assistant coach for the Indigenous All Stars team.

On 13 August 2020, Young was named interim head coach of the Dragons after Paul McGregor resigned mid-season. Following the club's round 17 loss against North Queensland in the 2020 NRL season, Young called out his players during the press conference saying "Same shit, different day," Young said. "It went wrong in blokes not getting their jobs done. Again, for the second week in a row, the game was there to be won in the last five minutes which is what this club wants to be about. "We want to be fighting for the full 80 minutes, right to the death". On 16 September 2020, Young informed St. George Illawarra that he would be leaving the club at the end of the season, despite being offered a position alongside incoming head coach Anthony Griffin.

Following the club's round 19 defeat to Newcastle where the Red V lost 42–18, an angry Young spoke to the media saying "We wouldn’t have beaten Dapto the way we played in the first half. It was Under 8s stuff".

In Round 20 of the 2020 NRL season, Young guided St. George Illawarra to a 30–22 victory over a depleted Melbourne at Kogarah Oval in his last game in charge as interim head coach.

At the end of the season, Young signed a three-year deal with the North Queensland Cowboys, joining the club as an assistant to incoming head coach Todd Payten. He coached the side in a caretaker capacity for one match in Payten's absence, due to Payten being deemed a close contact of a confirmed COVID-19 case.

On 14 July 2023, St. George Illawarra announced the return of Young as Senior Assistant Coach under head coach Shane Flanagan in 2024.

On 20 April 2026, following departure of Shane Flanagan as head coach, St. George Illawarra announced Young would be appointed interim head coach "at least" the remainder of the season." Young's first game as interim head coach at St. George Illawarra ended in disaster as the club lost 62-16 against the Sydney Roosters in round 8 of the 2026 NRL season. After losing their opening twelve matches to start the 2026 NRL season. In round 13, Young guided St. George Illawarra to their first win in 295 days defeating defending premiers Brisbane at Suncorp Stadium.

On 20 July 2026, Young was officially appointed Head Coach of the St. George Illawarra Dragons on a two-year deal. Despite some improvements under Young, he was unable to help the team avoid the Wooden Spoon which was their first as a club and the first time any St. George affiliated side had received since 1938.
