= 2023 St. George Illawarra Dragons season =

NRL rugby league season

- NRL Rank: 16th
- Play-off result: DNQ
- 2023 record: Wins: 5; draws: 0; losses: 19
- Points scored: For: 474; against: 673

Team information
- CEO: Ryan Webb
- Head coach: Anthony Griffin (until 15 May 2023) (Note: Following Round 11.); Ryan Carr (from 15 May 2023; Interim) (Note: Following Round 11 and continued until the conclusion of the season.)
- Captain: Ben Hunt (22); Jack de Belin (1); Blake Lawrie (1)
- Stadium: WIN Stadium (23,000) (7); Jubilee Oval (20,500) (5)
- Avg. attendance: 11,863
- High attendance: 17,357 (Round 15 – South Sydney Rabbitohs)
- Low attendance: 7,246 (Round 21 – Wests Tigers)

Top scorers
- Tries: Mikaele Ravalawa (21)
- Goals: Zac Lomax (57)
- Points: Zac Lomax (142)
← 2022	List of seasons	2024 →

The 2023 St. George Illawarra Dragons season is the 25th in the club's history. They will compete in the National Rugby League's 2023 Telstra Premiership. The Captain Ben Hunt and Head Coach Anthony Griffin retain their club roles for the 3rd consecutive season before being sacked before round 8 of the 2023 season being replaced by Ryan Carr.

== Player movement ==
These movements happened across the previous season, off-season and pre-season.

=== Gains ===
Player/Coach	Previous club	Length
Zane Musgrove	Wests Tigers	2024
Nick Lui-Toso	Northern Pride RLFC	2023
Jacob Liddle	Wests Tigers	2023
Ben Murdoch-Masila	New Zealand Warriors	2024
Paul Turner	Gold Coast Titans	2024

=== Losses ===
Player/Coach	New Club
Jackson Ford	New Zealand Warriors
George Burgess	Retired
Poasa Faamausili	Dolphins
Jack Gosiewski	North Queensland Cowboys
Andrew McCullough	retired
Tariq Sims	Melbourne Storm
Josh McGuire	Warrington Wolves

== Pre-Season Challenge ==
Date	Round	Opponent	Venue	Score	Tries	Goals	Attendance
Saturday, 11 February	Trial 1	St Helens	WIN Stadium	18 – 30	Zac Lomax 18'; Treigh Stewart 21'; Savelio Tamale 72'	Zac Lomax (2/2); Alexander Lobb (1/1)	6,463
Saturday, 18 February	Trial 2	South Sydney Rabbitohs	Glen Willow Oval	24 – 42	Moses Mbye 49'; Jayden Sullivan 58'; Mathew Feagai 65'; Jacob Liddle 76'	Zac Lomax (4/4)	8,317

== Regular season ==
=== Ladder ===
2023 NRL season
Pos	Team	Pld	W	D	L	B	PF	PA	PD	Pts
1	Penrith Panthers (P)	24	18	0	6	3	645	312	+333	42
2	Brisbane Broncos	24	18	0	6	3	639	425	+214	42
3	Melbourne Storm	24	16	0	8	3	627	459	+168	38
4	New Zealand Warriors	24	16	0	8	3	572	448	+124	38
5	Newcastle Knights	24	14	1	9	3	626	451	+175	35
6	Cronulla-Sutherland Sharks	24	14	0	10	3	619	497	+122	34
7	Sydney Roosters	24	13	0	11	3	472	496	−24	32
8	Canberra Raiders	24	13	0	11	3	486	623	−137	32
9	South Sydney Rabbitohs	24	12	0	12	3	564	505	+59	30
10	Parramatta Eels	24	12	0	12	3	587	574	+13	30
11	North Queensland Cowboys	24	12	0	12	3	546	542	+4	30
12	Manly Warringah Sea Eagles	24	11	1	12	3	545	539	+6	29
13	Dolphins	24	9	0	15	3	520	631	−111	24
14	Gold Coast Titans	24	9	0	15	3	527	653	−126	24
15	Canterbury-Bankstown Bulldogs	24	7	0	17	3	438	769	−331	20
16	St. George Illawarra Dragons	24	5	0	19	3	474	673	−199	16
17	Wests Tigers	24	4	0	20	3	385	675	−290	14

FG = Field Goal
PG = Penalty Goal

=== Matches ===
Date	Round	Opponent	Venue	Score	Tries	Goals	Attendance
	1	BYE					
Sunday, 12 March	2	Gold Coast Titans	Jubilee Oval	32 - 18	Jacob Liddle 31'; Ben Hunt 36'; Mikaele Ravalawa 39'; Tyrell Sloan 45'; Blake Lawrie 66'	Zac Lomax (3/5); PG: Zac Lomax (3/3)	8,538
Saturday, 18 March	3	Brisbane Broncos	Lang Park	40 - 18	Mathew Feagai 6'; Tyrell Sloan 27'; Jayden Sullivan 33'	Zac Lomax (2/3); PG: Zac Lomax (1/2)	26,612
Sunday, 26 March	4	Cronulla-Sutherland Sharks	Jubilee Oval	08 - 40	Ben Hunt 19'; Jaydn Su'a 24'	Zac Lomax (0/2)	15,126
Saturday, 1 April	5	Dolphins	WIN Stadium	38 - 12	Jacob Liddle 18'; Blake Lawrie 26'; Zac Lomax 41'; Ben Hunt 53'; Mikaele Ravalawa 61'; Mikaele Ravalawa 67'; Tyrell Sloan 74'	Zac Lomax (5/7)	16,472
Sunday, 9 April	6	Gold Coast Titans	Cbus Super Stadium	20 - 18	Zac Lomax 17'; Mikaele Ravalawa 42'; Ben Hunt 73'	Zac Lomax (2/3); PG: Zac Lomax (1/1)	12,452
Sunday, 16 April	7	Canberra Raiders	GIO Stadium	20 - 14	Tautau Moga 38'; Mathew Feagai 53'; Tautau Moga 77'	Zac Lomax (0/3); PG: Zac Lomax (1/1)	13,817
Tuesday, 25 April	8	Sydney Roosters	Allianz Stadium	27 - 26	Tautau Moga 15' Jack Bird 33' Tautau Moga 50' Tyrell Sloan 52' Tautau Moga 58'	Zac Lomax (3/5)	40,191
Sunday, 30 April	9	Canterbury-Bankstown Bulldogs	WIN Stadium	18 - 16	Mathew Feagai 18' Toby Couchman 46' Max Feagai 59'	Zac Lomax (2/3)	16,678
Sunday, 7 May	10	Wests Tigers	Lang Park	18 - 16	Mikaele Ravalawa 9' Jayden Sullivan 31' Jayden Sullivan 52'	Jayden Sullivan (2/3)	34,568
Saturday, 13 May	11	North Queensland Cowboys	Queensland Country Bank Stadium	42 - 22	Jack De Belin 2' Jaydn Su'a 55' Mikaele Ravalawa 68' Mosese Suli 78'	Jayden Sullivan (1/1) Jack Bird (1/1) Moses Mbye (1/1) Tyrell Sloan (0/1)	17,852
Friday, 19 May	12	Sydney Roosters	Jubilee Oval	24 - 22	Mosese Suli 7' Ben Hunt 12' Jaydn Su'a 72' Mathew Feagai 79'	Zac Lomax (3/4); PG: Zac Lomax (1/1)	9,007
Thursday, 25 May	13	Dolphins	Kayo Stadium	26 - 12	Jack Bird 5' Toby Couchman 39'	Zac Lomax (1/2); PG: Zac Lomax (1/1)	10,047
Sunday, 4 June	14	Penrith Panthers	BlueBet Stadium	26 - 18	Mikaele Ravalawa 14' Mikaele Ravalawa 36' Zac Lomax 65'	Zac Lomax (1/3); PG: Zac Lomax (2/2)	16,912
Saturday, 10 June	15	South Sydney Rabbitohs	Jubilee Oval	36 - 30	Ben Hunt 15' Mikaele Ravalawa 19' Jacob Liddle 50' Jaydn Su'a 60' Michael Molo 66' Jaiyden Hunt 72'	Zac Lomax (5/6); PG: Zac Lomax (1/1)	17,357
	16	BYE					
Friday, 25 June	17	New Zealand Warriors	WIN Stadium	48 - 18	Tyrell Sloan 13' Zane Musgrove 45' Francis Molo 66'	Zac Lomax (3/3)	9,275
Thursday, 29 June	18	Cronulla-Sutherland Sharks	PointsBet Stadium	52 - 16	Mikaele Ravalawa 1' Tautau Moga 20' Tyrell Sloan 50'	Zac Lomax (2/3)	10,267
Friday, 7 July	19	Canberra Raiders	WIN Stadium	36 - 26	Mikaele Ravalawa 33' Zac Lomax 41' Mikaele Ravalawa 56' Zac Lomax 61' Mikaele Ravalawa 63'	Zac Lomax (3/5)	9,319
	20	BYE					
Thursday, 20 July	21	Wests Tigers	WIN Stadium	18 - 14	Tyrell Sloan 16' Zac Lomax 22' Mikaele Ravalawa 63	Zac Lomax (3/3)	7,246
Saturday, 29 July	22	Manly Warringah Sea Eagles	WIN Stadium	24 - 18	Francis Molo 6' Billy Burns 57' Tyrell Sloan 69'	Zac Lomax (2/3); PG: Zac Lomax (1/1)	14,872
Sunday, 6 August	23	Parramatta Eels	CommBank Stadium	26 - 20	Mikaele Ravalawa 19' Mikaele Ravalawa 25' Mikaele Ravalawa 38' Mikaele Ravalawa 49'	Zac Lomax (2/4)	23,596
Saturday, 12 August	24	South Sydney Rabbitohs	Barlow Park	26 - 14	Mikaele Ravalawa 19' Ben Hunt 44' Tyrell Sloan 65'	Ben Hunt (1/3)	8,378
Saturday, 19 August	25	Melbourne Storm	WIN Stadium	38 - 28	Billy Burns 12' Tyrell Sloan 17' Talatau Amone 24' Billy Burns 43' Mikaele Ravalawa 73'	Ben Hunt (4/5)	8,326
Friday, 25 August	26	New Zealand Warriors	Mount Smart Stadium	18 - 6	Zac Lomax 61'	Zac Lomax (1/1)	25,095
Saturday, 2 September	27	Newcastle Knights	Jubilee Oval	32 - 12	Ben Hunt 17' Mikaele Ravalawa 66'	Zac Lomax (2/2)	10,137

== 2023 squad ==
St. George Illawarra Dragons 2023 squad
Top 30 squad - 2023 NRL season			Development players	Coaching staff
Junior Amone – FE; Jack Bird – SR, LK, CE; Billy Burns – SR; Toby Couchman – PR; Jack de Belin – LK, PR; Mat Feagai – WG; Max Feagai – CE, WG; Viliami Fifita – PR; Tyrell Fuimaono – LK, PR; Ben Hunt (c) – HB, HK	Jaiyden Hunt – SR, LK; Blake Lawrie – PR; Jacob Liddle – HK; Zac Lomax – CE; Nick Lui-Toso – PR; Tautau Moga – WG, CE; Francis Molo – PR; Michael Molo – PR, LK; Ben Murdoch-Masila – SR, LK	Zane Musgrove – PR; Cody Ramsey – FB; Mikaele Ravalawa – WG; Tyrell Sloan – FB; Jaydn Su'a – SR; Moses Suli – CE; Jayden Sullivan – FE, HB; Paul Turner – FB	Josh Coric – PR; Sione Finau – WG; Connor Muhleisen – HK; Jackson Shereb – SR, CE; Alec Tuitavake – LK, PR; Extended squad: Ryan Couchman – LK, SR; Alex Lobb – WG; Dan Russell – SR	Manager: Ben Haran (General Manager of Football); Head coach: Ryan Carr (interim); Assistant coaches: Ben Woolf; Bronx Goodwin (NSW Cup Coach); Aaron Hertsch (Jersey Flegg Coach); Russell Aitken (Pathways & Development Coach); Willie Talau (Pathways & Development); Jamie Soward (NRLW & Specialist Coach); Medical professionals: Tony Guilfoyle (Physical Performance Manager); Managers: Ian Millward (Pathways Director); Legend: (c) Captain(s); (vc) Vice-captain(s); Updated: 21 May 2023; Source(s): Dragons team profiles
