= 2022 St. George Illawarra Dragons season =

Australian NRL team season

Team information
- CEO: Ryan Webb
- Coach: Anthony Griffin
- Captain: Ben Hunt
- Stadium: Netstrata Jubilee Stadium; WIN Stadium
← 2021	2023 →

The 2022 St. George Illawarra Dragons season will be the 24th in the joint venture club's history. The Dragons' men's team will compete in the NRL's 2022 Telstra Premiership season. The women's team, will play their fifth season in the NRLW's 2022 Telstra Women's Premiership season.

== Squad ==
St. George Illawarra Dragons 2022 Squad
Top 30 Squad – 2022 Season			Development Players	Coaching Staff
(Australia) Junior Amone – FE; (Australia) Jack Bird – SR, FE, LK, CE; (England) George Burgess – PR; (Australia) Billy Burns – SR; (Australia) Jack de Belin – LK, PR; (Samoa) Poasa Faamausili – PR; (New Zealand) Mat Feagai – WG, CE; (New Zealand) Max Feagai – CE; (Australia) Jackson Ford – SR, LK; (Australia) Tyrell Fuimaono – LK, SR	(Australia) Jack Gosiewski – SR; (Australia) Ben Hunt (c) – HB; (Australia) Josh Kerr – PR, SR; (Australia) Blake Lawrie – PR; (Australia) Zac Lomax – CE; (Australia) Moses Mbye – FB, HK, HB; (Australia) Andrew McCullough (vc) – HK; (Australia) Josh McGuire – SR; (New Zealand) Tautau Moga – CE, WG; (Australia) Francis Molo – PR	(Australia) Cody Ramsey – FB, WG; (Fiji) Mikaele Ravalawa – WG; (Australia) Tariq Sims – SR, LK, PR; (Australia) Tyrell Sloan – FB; (Samoa) Jaydn Su'A – SR; (Australia) Moses Suli – CE; (Australia) Jayden Sullivan – HB, HK; (Australia) Aaron Woods – PR	(Australia) Jaiyden Hunt – PR, SR, LK; (Cook Islands) Michael Molo – LK, SR, PR; (Australia) Shalom O'Ofou – PR; (Australia) Jonathon Reuben – WG	Manager: (Australia) Ben Haran (General Manager of Football); Head coach: (Australia) Anthony Griffin; Assistant coaches: (Australia) Matthew Elliott; (Australia) Peter Gentle; (Australia) Mathew Head (Pathways Coach); (Australia) Russell Aitken (KOE NSW Cup Coach); (Samoa) Willie Talau (Jersey Flegg Coach); Medical Professionals: (Australia) Elliot Jackson (Strength & Conditioning Coach); (Australia) Tony Guilfoyle (Physical Performance Manager); Managers: (Australia) Ian Millward (NRL Recruitment Manager); Legend: (c) Captain(s); (vc) Vice-captain(s); Updated: 10 August 2022; Source(s): Dragons Team Profiles

=== Gains and losses ===
▲ or ▼	Player	2021 Club	2022 Club	Source
▲	George Burgess	Unattached	St. George Illawarra Dragons	
▲	Jack Gosiewski	Manly Warringah Sea Eagles	St. George Illawarra Dragons	
▲	Moses Mbye	Wests Tigers	St. George Illawarra Dragons	
▲	Tautau Moga	South Sydney Rabbitohs	St. George Illawarra Dragons	
▲	Francis Molo	North Queensland Cowboys	St. George Illawarra Dragons	
▲	Jaydn Su'A	South Sydney Rabbitohs	St. George Illawarra Dragons	
▲	Moses Suli	Manly Warringah Sea Eagles	St. George Illawarra Dragons	
▲	Aaron Woods	Cronulla-Sutherland Sharks	St. George Illawarra Dragons	
▼	Gerard Beale	St. George Illawarra Dragons	Unattached	
▼	Adam Clune	St. George Illawarra Dragons	Newcastle Knights	
▼	Matthew Dufty	St. George Illawarra Dragons	Canterbury-Bankstown Bulldogs	
▼	Kaide Ellis	St. George Illawarra Dragons	Super League: Wigan Warriors	
▼	Hayden Lomax	St. George Illawarra Dragons	Temora Dragons (Group 9 Rugby League)	
▼	Cameron McInnes	St. George Illawarra Dragons	Cronulla-Sutherland Sharks	
▼	Trent Merrin	St. George Illawarra Dragons	Retirement	
▼	Corey Norman	St. George Illawarra Dragons	Unattached	
▼	Jordan Pereira	St. George Illawarra Dragons	Brisbane Broncos	
▼	Paul Vaughan	St. George Illawarra Dragons	Canterbury-Bankstown Bulldogs	
▼	Brayden Wiliame	St. George Illawarra Dragons	USA Perpignan (French rugby union)	

== Ladder ==
2022 NRL season
Pos	Team	Pld	W	D	L	B	PF	PA	PD	Pts
1	Penrith Panthers (P)	24	20	0	4	1	636	330	+306	42
2	Cronulla-Sutherland Sharks	24	18	0	6	1	573	364	+209	38
3	North Queensland Cowboys	24	17	0	7	1	633	361	+272	36
4	Parramatta Eels	24	16	0	8	1	608	489	+119	34
5	Melbourne Storm	24	15	0	9	1	657	410	+247	32
6	Sydney Roosters	24	15	0	9	1	635	434	+201	32
7	South Sydney Rabbitohs	24	14	0	10	1	604	474	+130	30
8	Canberra Raiders	24	14	0	10	1	524	461	+63	30
9	Brisbane Broncos	24	13	0	11	1	514	550	−36	28
10	St. George Illawarra Dragons	24	12	0	12	1	469	569	−100	26
11	Manly Warringah Sea Eagles	24	9	0	15	1	490	595	−105	20
12	Canterbury-Bankstown Bulldogs	24	7	0	17	1	383	575	−192	16
13	Gold Coast Titans	24	6	0	18	1	455	660	−205	14
14	Newcastle Knights	24	6	0	18	1	372	662	−290	14
15	New Zealand Warriors	24	6	0	18	1	408	700	−292	14
16	Wests Tigers	24	4	0	20	1	352	679	−327	10

=== Ladder progression ===
Round	1	2	3	4	5	6	7	8	9	10	11	12	13	14	15	16	17	18	19	20	21	22	23	24	25
Ladder Position																									

== Season results ==
=== Pre-season trials ===
Round	Home	Score	Away	Match Information
Round	Home	Score	Away	Date and Time (AEDT)	Venue	Referee	Attendance	Source
1	Parramatta Eels	22 – 26	St. George Illawarra Dragons	Sunday, 20 February, 6:00 pm	CommBank Stadium
2 (Charity Shield)	South Sydney Rabbitohs	10 – 16	St. George Illawarra Dragons	Saturday, 26 February, 7:00 pm	Glen Willow Regional Sports Stadium	Z. Przeklasa-Adamski	9,257

=== NRL season ===
Round	Home	Score	Away	Match Information
Round	Home	Score	Away	Date and Time (AEDT round 1–3, AEST round 4–25)	Venue	Referee	Attendance	Source
1	New Zealand Warriors	16 – 28	St. George Illawarra Dragons	Saturday, 12 March, 5:30 pm	Sunshine Coast Stadium	Peter Gough	5,382
2	St. George Illawarra Dragons	16 – 20	Penrith Panthers	Friday, 18 March, 6:00 pm	Netstrata Jubilee Stadium	Chris Sutton	10,057
3	St. George Illawarra Dragons	12 – 36	Cronulla-Sutherland Sharks	Thursday, 24 March, 8:05 pm	WIN Stadium	Gerard Sutton	10,122
4	Parramatta Eels	48 – 14	St. George Illawarra Dragons	Sunday, 3 April, 6:15 pm	CommBank Stadium	Todd Smith	19,711
5	South Sydney Rabbitohs	24 – 12	St. George Illawarra Dragons	Saturday, 9 April, 5:30 pm	Accor Stadium	Ben Cummins	11,332
6	St. George Illawarra Dragons	21 – 16	Newcastle Knights	Sunday, 17 April, 4:05 pm	WIN Stadium	Ben Cummins	11,113
7 (Anzac Day)	St. George Illawarra Dragons	14 – 12	Sydney Roosters	Monday, 25 April, 4:00 pm	Sydney Cricket Ground	Adam Gee	35,273
8	St. George Illawarra Dragons	–	Wests Tigers	Sunday, 1 May, 4:05 pm	WIN Stadium	Gerard Sutton	16,110
9	Melbourne Storm	–	St. George Illawarra Dragons	Sunday, 8 May, 2:00 pm	AAMI Park	Peter Gough	11,723
10 (Magic Round)	Gold Coast Titans	–	St. George Illawarra Dragons	Saturday, 14 May, 5:30 pm	Suncorp Stadium	Todd Smith	41,593
11	St. George Illawarra Dragons	–	New Zealand Warriors	Saturday, 21 May, 3:00 pm	Netstrata Jubilee Stadium	Chris Sutton	7,147
12	Canterbury-Bankstown Bulldogs	–	St. George Illawarra Dragons	Sunday, 29 May, 2:00 pm	Belmore Sports Ground	Ben Cummins	16,991
13		BYE
14	North Queensland Cowboys	–	St. George Illawarra Dragons	Friday, 10 June, 7:55 pm	Queensland Country Bank Stadium	Todd Smith	14,683
15	St. George Illawarra Dragons	–	South Sydney Rabbitohs	Thursday, 16 June, 7:50 pm	WIN Stadium	Grant Atkins	11,257
16	St. George Illawarra Dragons	–	Canberra Raiders	Sunday, 3 July, 4:05 pm	WIN Stadium	Peter Gough	7,069
17	Brisbane Broncos	–	St. George Illawarra Dragons	Sunday, 10 July, 4:05 pm	Suncorp Stadium	Grant Atkins	29,234
18	Sydney Roosters	–	St. George Illawarra Dragons	Saturday, 16 July, 3:00 pm	Sydney Cricket Ground	Grant Atkins	15,721
19	St. George Illawarra Dragons	–	Manly Warringah Sea Eagles	Friday, 22 July, 6:00 pm	Netstrata Jubilee Stadium	Adam Gee	7,137
20	St. George Illawarra Dragons	–	North Queensland Cowboys	Sunday, 31 July, 4:05 pm	Netstrata Jubilee Stadium	Chris Sutton	9,517
21	Cronulla-Sutherland Sharks	–	St. George Illawarra Dragons	Saturday, 6 August, 7:35 pm	PointsBet Stadium	Ashley Klein	11,427
22	Canberra Raiders	–	St. George Illawarra Dragons	Sunday, 14 August, 2:00 pm	GIO Stadium	Adam Gee	11,216
23	St. George Illawarra Dragons	–	Gold Coast Titans	Sunday, 21 August, 2:00 pm	WIN Stadium	Liam Kennedy	12,348
24	Wests Tigers	–	St. George Illawarra Dragons	Sunday, 28 August, 2:00 pm	CommBank Stadium	Liam Kennedy	9,789
25	St. George Illawarra Dragons	–	Brisbane Broncos	Saturday, 3 September, 5:30 pm	Netstrata Jubilee Stadium	Ben Cummins	8,247

== Representative honours ==
Player	2022 All Stars match	State of Origin 1	Mid-season internationals	State of Origin 2	State of Origin 3	Prime Minister's XIII	2021 World Cup
Jack Bird	Indigenous All Stars						
Josh Kerr	Indigenous All Stars						
Tyrell Fuimaono	Indigenous All Stars						
Tyrell Sloan	Indigenous All Stars						
