= 2021 St. George Illawarra Dragons season =

- NRL rank: 11th
- 2021 record: Wins: 8; draws: 0; losses: 16
- Points scored: For: 474; against: 616

Team information
- CEO: Ryan Webb
- Coach: Anthony Griffin
- Captain: Cameron McInnes Ben Hunt
- Stadium: Netstrata Jubilee Stadium; WIN Stadium

Top scorers
- Tries: Mikaele Ravalawa (14)
- Goals: Zac Lomax (35)
- Points: Zac Lomax (86)
← 2020	2022 →

The 2021 St. George Illawarra Dragons season was the 23rd in the joint venture club's history. The Dragons' men's team competed in the NRL's 2021 Telstra Premiership season. The women's team, was scheduled to play their fourth season in the NRLW's 2021 Telstra Women's Premiership season, however that has since been postponed to 2022.

== Squad ==
St. George Illawarra Dragons 2021 Squad
Top 30 Squad - 2021 Season			Coaching staff
Eddie Blacker – PR; Billy Brittain – HK; Adam Clune – HB, FE; Jack de Belin – LK, PR; Matthew Dufty – FB; Kaide Ellis – PR, LK; Mat Feagai – CE, WG; Max Feagai – CE, WG; Jackson Ford – SR, LK; Tyrell Fuimaono – SR, CE	Ben Hunt (gk) – HB, HK, FE; Josh Kerr – PR, SR; Blake Lawrie – PR, LK; Hayden Lomax – LK; Zac Lomax (gk) – CE, FB; Cameron McInnes (c) – HK, LK; Trent Merrin – LK, PR; Corey Norman (gk) – FE, HB, FB; Jordan Pereira – WG; Cody Ramsey – FB, WG	Mikaele Ravalawa – WG, CE; Jason Saab – WG; Shaun Sauni-Esau – CE; Korbin Sims – PR, LK; Tariq Sims – SR; Jayden Sullivan – FE, HB; Paul Vaughan – PR; Brayden Wiliame – CE	Head coach: Anthony Griffin (head coach); Assistant coaches: Ben Haran (General Manager of Football); Ian Millward (NRL Recruitment Manager); Matthew Elliott (assistant coach); Peter Gentle (assistant coach); Mathew Head (Pathways Coach); Elliot Jackson (strength & conditioning coach); Cody Parsons (head of sports science); Davis Theobald (physiotherapist); Tony Guilfoyle (physical performance manager); Legend: (c) Captain(s); (vc) Vice-captain(s); (gk) Goal kicker; Injured; Updated: 30 September 2020; Source(s): Dragons Team Profiles

=== Gains and losses ===
▲ or ▼	Player	2020 Club	2021 Club	Source
▲	Daniel Alvaro	Parramatta Eels	St. George Illawarra Dragons	
▲	Gerard Beale	Retirement	St. George Illawarra Dragons	
▲	Jack Bird	Brisbane Broncos	St. George Illawarra Dragons	
▲	Billy Burns	Penrith Panthers	St. George Illawarra Dragons	
▲	Poasa Faamausili	Sydney Roosters	St. George Illawarra Dragons	
▲	Freddy Lussick	Sydney Roosters	St. George Illawarra Dragons (loan)	
▲	Andrew McCullough	Brisbane Broncos	St. George Illawarra Dragons	
▲	Josh McGuire	North Queensland Cowboys	St. George Illawarra Dragons	
▲	Jamayne Taunoa-Brown	New Zealand Warriors	St. George Illawarra Dragons (loan)	
▼	Euan Aitken	St. George Illawarra Dragons	New Zealand Warriors	
▼	Eddie Blacker	St. George Illawarra Dragons	Penrith Panthers	
▼	Tyson Frizell	St. George Illawarra Dragons	Newcastle Knights	
▼	Jason Saab	St. George Illawarra Dragons	Manly Warringah Sea Eagles	
▼	Korbin Sims	St. George Illawarra Dragons	Hull Kingston Rovers (Super League)	
▼	Paul Vaughan	St. George Illawarra Dragons	Sacked (mid-season)	

== Ladder ==
Pos	Team	Pld	W	D	L	B	PF	PA	PD	Pts	
1	Melbourne Storm (M)	24	21	0	3	1	815	316	+499	44	Advance to finals series
2	Penrith Panthers (P)	24	21	0	3	1	676	286	+390	44	Advance to finals series
3	South Sydney Rabbitohs	24	20	0	4	1	775	453	+322	42	Advance to finals series
4	Manly-Warringah Sea Eagles	24	16	0	8	1	744	492	+252	34	Advance to finals series
5	Sydney Roosters	24	16	0	8	1	630	489	+141	34	Advance to finals series
6	Parramatta Eels	24	15	0	9	1	566	457	+109	32	Advance to finals series
7	Newcastle Knights	24	12	0	12	1	428	571	−143	26	Advance to finals series
8	Gold Coast Titans	24	10	0	14	1	580	583	−3	22	Advance to finals series
9	Cronulla-Sutherland Sharks	24	10	0	14	1	520	556	−36	22	
10	Canberra Raiders	24	10	0	14	1	481	578	−97	22	
11	St. George Illawarra Dragons	24	8	0	16	1	474	616	−142	18	
12	New Zealand Warriors	24	8	0	16	1	453	624	−171	18	
13	Wests Tigers	24	8	0	16	1	500	714	−214	18	
14	Brisbane Broncos	24	7	0	17	1	446	695	−249	16	
15	North Queensland Cowboys	24	7	0	17	1	460	748	−288	16	
16	Canterbury-Bankstown Bulldogs (W)	24	3	0	21	1	340	710	−370	8	

Updated to match(es) played on 5 September 2021. Source: 2021 NRL Ladder
(M) Minor premiers; (P) Premiers; (W) Wooden spoon

=== Ladder progression ===
Round	1	2	3	4	5	6	7	8	9	10	11	12	13	14	15	16	17	18	19	20	21	22	23	24	25
Ladder Position	12th	11th	5th	6th	4th	6th	6th	6th	6th	6th	7th	8th	8th	8th	7th	7th	7th	7th	8th	10th	11th	11th	12th	12th	11th

== Season results ==
=== Pre-season trials ===
Round	Home	Score	Away	Match Information
Round	Home	Score	Away	Date and Time (AEDT)	Venue	Referee	Attendance	Source
1	Cronulla-Sutherland Sharks	36 – 28	St. George Illawarra Dragons	Friday, 12 February, 5:30 pm	PointsBet Stadium	Todd Smith	—
2	St. George Illawarra Dragons	6 – 28	Parramatta Eels	Thursday, 18 February, 6:00 pm	Netstrata Jubilee Stadium	Matt Noyen	—
3 (Charity Shield)	St. George Illawarra Dragons	16 – 48	South Sydney Rabbitohs	Saturday, 27 February, 7:00 pm	Glen Willow Regional Sports Stadium	Peter Gough	6,840

=== NRL season ===
Round	Home	Score	Away	Match Information
Round	Home	Score	Away	Date and Time (AEDT round 1–3, AEST round 4–25)	Venue	Referee	Attendance	Source
1	St. George Illawarra Dragons	18 – 32	Cronulla-Sutherland Sharks	Sunday, 14 March, 6:15 pm	Netstrata Jubilee Stadium	Peter Gough	7,636
2	North Queensland Cowboys	18 – 25	St. George Illawarra Dragons	Saturday, 20 March, 7:35 pm	Queensland Country Bank Stadium	Ben Cummins	15,120
3	St. George Illawarra Dragons	38 – 12	Manly Warringah Sea Eagles	Friday, 26 March, 6:00 pm	WIN Stadium	Chris Sutton	9,253
4 (Alex McKinnon Cup)	Newcastle Knights	13 – 22	St. George Illawarra Dragons	Sunday, 4 April, 4:05 pm	McDonald Jones Stadium	Peter Gough	21,770
5	Parramatta Eels	12 – 26	St. George Illawarra Dragons	Sunday, 11 April, 6:15 pm	Bankwest Stadium	Grant Atkins	24,384
6	St. George Illawarra Dragons	14 – 20	New Zealand Warriors	Sunday, 4 April, 2:00 pm	Netstrata Jubilee Stadium	Chris Sutton	11,222
7 (ANZAC Day)	Sydney Roosters	34 – 10	St. George Illawarra Dragons	Sunday, 25 April, 4:05 pm	Sydney Cricket Ground	Ashley Klein	37,620
8	St. George Illawarra Dragons	8 – 16	Wests Tigers	Sunday, 2 May, 4:05 pm	WIN Stadium	Chris Sutton	12,323
9	St. George Illawarra Dragons	32 – 12	Canterbury-Bankstown Bulldogs	Sunday, 9 May, 4:05 pm	Netstrata Jubilee Stadium	Ben Cummins	7,253
10 (Magic Round)	Melbourne Storm	44 – 18	St George Illawarra Dragons	Sunday, 16 May, 4:05 pm	Suncorp Stadium	Peter Gough	41,983
11	Cronulla-Sutherland Sharks	13 – 12	St George Illawarra Dragons	Friday, 21 May, 7:55 pm	Netstrata Jubilee Stadium	Ben Cummins	8,947
12	Wests Tigers	34 – 18	St George Illawarra Dragons	Friday, 28 May, 7:55 pm	Bankwest Stadium	Adam Gee	9,982
13	St George Illawarra Dragons	52 – 24	Brisbane Broncos	Thursday, 3 June, 7:50 pm	Netstrata Jubilee Stadium	Matt Cecchin	5,107
14 (Queen's Birthday)	Canterbury-Bankstown Bulldogs	28 – 6	St George Illawarra Dragons	Monday, 14 June, 4:00 pm	Stadium Australia	Gerard Sutton	17,382
15	St George Illawarra Dragons	22 – 20	Canberra Raiders	Saturday, 19 June, 5:30 pm	WIN Stadium	Chris Sutton	9,239
16	New Zealand Warriors	18 – 19	St. George Illawarra Dragons	Friday, 2 July, 6:00 pm	Mount Smart Stadium	Peter Gough	0
17		BYE
18	Manly Warringah Sea Eagles	32 – 18	St. George Illawarra Dragons	Friday, 16 July, 8:05 pm	Cbus Super Stadium	Adam Gee	15,038
19	St. George Illawarra Dragons	10 – 32	Gold Coast Titans	Sunday, 25 July, 2:00 pm	Cbus Super Stadium	Gerard Sutton	4,424
20	St. George Illawarra Dragons	14 – 50	South Sydney Rabbitohs	Sunday, 1 August, 6:25 pm	Suncorp Stadium	Chris Butler	0
21	Canberra Raiders	20 – 12	St. George Illawarra Dragons	Friday, 6 August, 6:00 pm	Cbus Super Stadium	Chris Sutton	0
22	St. George Illawarra Dragons	16 – 34	Penrith Panthers	Friday, 13 August, 6:00 pm	Suncorp Stadium	Ben Cummins	6,653
23	St. George Illawarra Dragons	22 – 40	Sydney Roosters	Sunday, 22 August, 2:00 pm	Clive Berghofer Stadium	Chris Sutton	7,822
24	St. George Illawarra Dragons	26 – 38	North Queensland Cowboys	Saturday, 28 August, 3:00 pm	Browne Park	Peter Gough	4,487
25	South Sydney Rabbitohs	20 – 16	St. George Illawarra Dragons	Saturday, 4 September, 7:35 pm	Sunshine Coast Stadium	Matt Cecchin	3,295

== Representative honours ==
Player	2021 All Stars match	State of Origin 1	State of Origin 2	State of Origin 3
Tyrell Fuimaono	Indigenous All Stars			
Josh Kerr	Indigenous All Stars			
Tariq Sims		New South Wales	New South Wales	New South Wales
Ben Hunt		Queensland	Queensland	Queensland
Andrew McCullough			Queensland	
