= Jacob Liddle =

Australian rugby league footballer

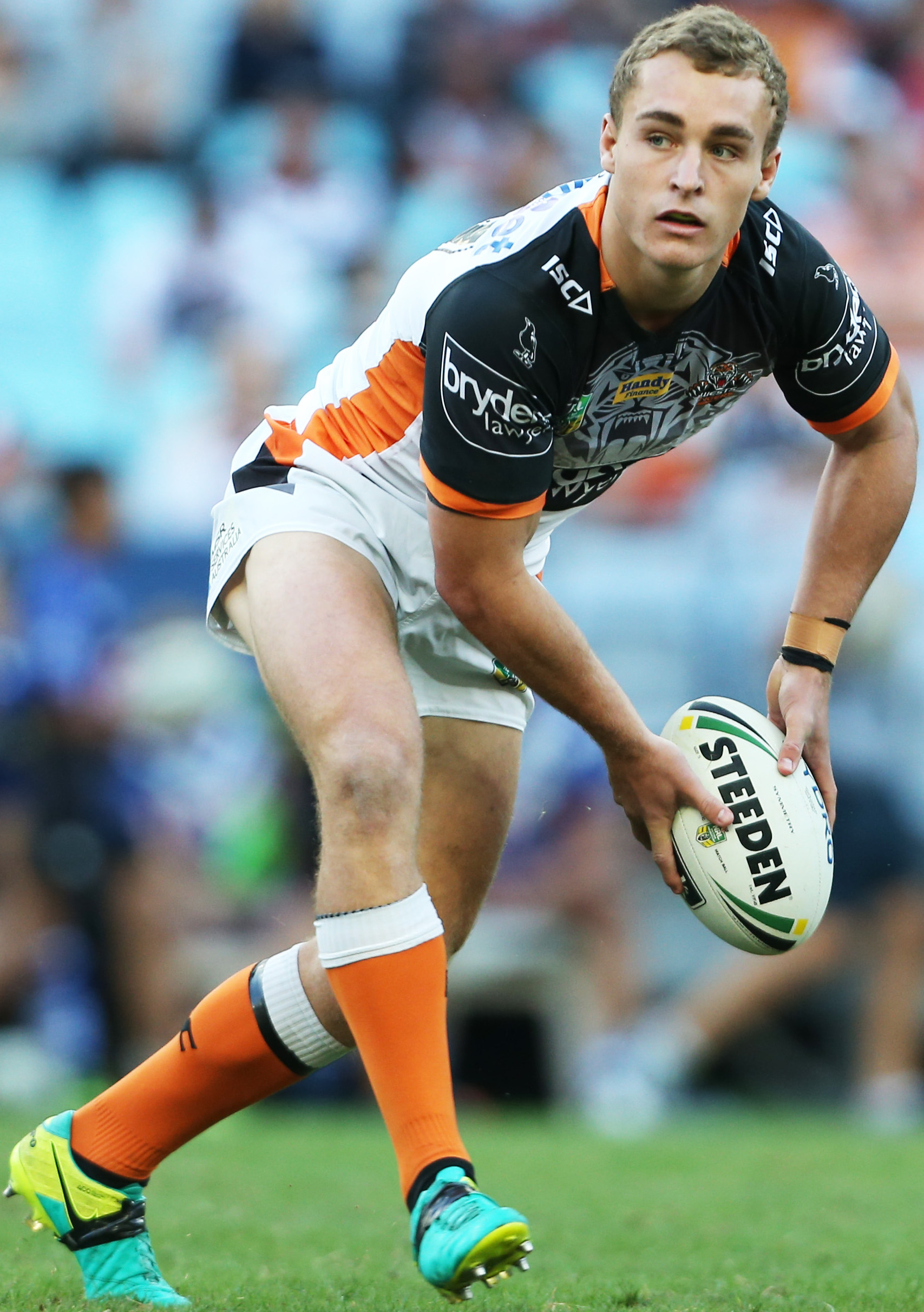

Personal information
- Full name: Jacob Liddle
- Born: 27 October 1996 (age 30) Gosford, New South Wales, Australia
- Height: 184 cm (6 ft 0 in)
- Weight: 91 kg (14 st 5 lb)

Playing information
- Position: Hooker
Club
Years	Team	Pld	T	G	FG	P
2016–22	Wests Tigers	74	12	0	0	48
2023–	St. George Illawarra	82	19	0	0	76
	Total	156	31	0	0	124
Representative
Years	Team	Pld	T	G	FG	P
2024	Prime Minister's XIII	1	1	0	0	4
- Source: As of 22 August 2026

Jacob Liddle (born 27 October 1996) is an Australian professional rugby league footballer who plays as a hooker for the St George Illawarra Dragons in the National Rugby League (NRL).

He previously played for the Wests Tigers in the NRL.

== Background ==
Liddle was born in Gosford, New South Wales, Australia. He studied at Wadalba Community School.

He played his junior rugby league for the Wyong Roos, before being signed by the Wests Tigers.

== Playing career ==
=== Early career ===
In November and December 2014, Liddle played for the Australian Schoolboys. In 2015 and 2016, he played for the Wests Tigers' NYC team, and he was named the team's Player's Player in 2015. He played for the New South Wales under-20s team against the Queensland under-20s team in 2015, and was selected again in 2016, but decided to forgo the match to make his first-grade debut.

=== 2016 ===
On 14 June, Liddle re-signed with the Tigers on a 2-year contract until the end of 2018. With Robbie Farah absent for State of Origin, and Manaia Cherrington and Matt Ballin injured, Wests Tigers were given a dispensation for Liddle to make his debut in round 18 against the Canterbury-Bankstown Bulldogs, despite exceeding the 2nd tier salary cap. Coming off the bench, he scored a try early in the 2nd half. Coach Jason Taylor said, "For salary cap reasons he probably won't play any more part. That's disappointing. He didn't look out of place for a second against a team with those big guys and his defence was superb."

=== 2017 ===
With Farah leaving the club, Liddle was a regular in first grade, mostly playing from the bench and interchanging with Matt McIlwrick at hooker. From round 16, he changed to the starting hooker, but 3 games later he suffered a season-ending shoulder injury. Scoring 3 tries from his 13 appearances, Liddle was awarded the Wests Tigers Rookie of the Year. Mid-season he signed an extension to remain at the club to the end of 2019.

=== 2018 ===
Returning from his shoulder injury, Liddle played on the bench in round 4. He said, "Definitely long-term, I want to wear that No.9 jersey. I think at the moment I just want to keep on playing footy and getting my match fitness up and getting my tackling right. But I was pretty happy with the hit out today." He made his return to the starting team in round 6, and scored a penalty try against the Manly Warringah Sea Eagles, after he was illegally tackled without the ball by Daly Cherry-Evans, causing him to fumble the grounding of the ball. The Tigers went on to win 38-12.

Injury again limited Liddle in 2018, making 13 appearances with only two in the starting side. With former captain Robbie Farah returning to the club mid-season, all of Liddle's subsequent appearances were spelling Farah. Liddle said, "He's come back and showed me a few things. I watch him at training on the field and you learn off him. I probably haven't played as much as I've wanted to play this year, but it's all a learning process."

=== 2019 ===
Liddle remained the second string hooker behind Farah in 2019. After missing the beginning of the season with rehabilitation, he played 10 games off the bench mid-season before returning to reserve grade. With Farah suffering an injury in round 21, Liddle was recalled as starting hooker in round 22, but was taken from the field with a serious knee injury after just six minutes of play. He was ruled out for the remainder of the season with a torn anterior cruciate ligament, saying, "I’ll come back bigger and stronger. I’ve had two shoulder recos and you just take it day by day. You don’t think about the long haul, you just think about the daily things, doing the recovery. It’s all mental really. You get back on the horse and plough ahead."

=== 2020 ===
After almost a year out of the game, Liddle made his return for the Wests Tigers against Canterbury-Bankstown which Wests won 29-28, with Liddle passing the ball to Luke Brooks for the game-winning field goal. Coach Maguire said, "Liddsy was steering the team around well. We saw that at the back end of the game when he did that to get the field goal. He had us in the right position." The following week, he scored his first try of the season against the Sydney Roosters in a 38-16 defeat.

=== 2021 ===
Starting the season at hooker, Liddle was dropped in favour of Jake Simpkin for 4 weeks from round 6, returning to the starting spot in round 9. In June, he signed a contract extension to remain at the club until the end of 2023. Days later, he scored a 95 metre runaway try as Wests Tigers toppled the previously undefeated Penrith. Trainer Robbie Farah said, "He started the year well, but he tapered off a bit so it was probably a kick in the guts to be dropped, but the way he’s reacted has been great to see. I think he’s come into the side a better player."

=== 2022 ===
Liddle played a total of 11 games for Wests Tigers in the 2022 NRL season as the club finished bottom of the table for the first time. On September 14, Liddle was released from the final year of his contract with Wests to take up a deal with St. George Illawarra for the 2023 season.

=== 2023 ===
On 12 March, Liddle made his club debut for the Red V against the Gold Coast Titans. During the round 2 clash, Liddle also scored his first try for the club which came in the 31st minute of the match.

After a loss in round 9 against Canterbury, St. George Illawarra head coach Anthony Griffin demoted Liddle from the side. But after two NSW cup games he was recalled into the first grade side against the Sydney Roosters. Liddle was one of the stars as the club won the game with winger Mathew Feagai going over in the 79th minute to end a six game losing streak and win 24-22. Liddle would play a total of 22 games for the club in the 2023 NRL season as they finished 16th on the table.

=== 2024 ===
Liddle in 2026

Liddle played 22 games for St. George Illawarra in the 2024 NRL season as the club finished 11th on the table.

=== 2025 ===
In round 9 of the 2025 NRL season, Liddle scored two tries for St. George Illawarra in their 34-28 loss against the Wests Tigers. On 11 June, St. George Illawarra announced that Liddle had re-signed with the club until the end of the 2028 season. Liddle played every game for St. George Illawarra in the 2025 NRL season as the club finished a disappointing 15th on the table.

=== 2026 ===
Liddle played 14 matches for St. George Illawarra in the 2026 NRL season as the club finished with the Wooden Spoon.

== Statistics ==
Season	Team	Pld	T	G	FG	P
2016	Wests Tigers	1	1	-	-	4
2017	Wests Tigers	13	3	-	-	12
2018	Wests Tigers	13	1	-	-	4
2019	Wests Tigers	10	-	-	-	0
2020	Wests Tigers	6	1	-	-	4
2021	Wests Tigers	20	6	-	-	24
2022	Wests Tigers	10				
2023	St. George Illawarra Dragons	22	3			12
2024	St. George Illawarra Dragons	22	5			20
2025	St. George Illawarra Dragons	24	9			36
2026	St. George Illawarra Dragons	14	2			8
	Totals	156	31	0	0	124

*denotes season competing
