= Francis Molo =

Cook Islands & Samoa international rugby league footballer

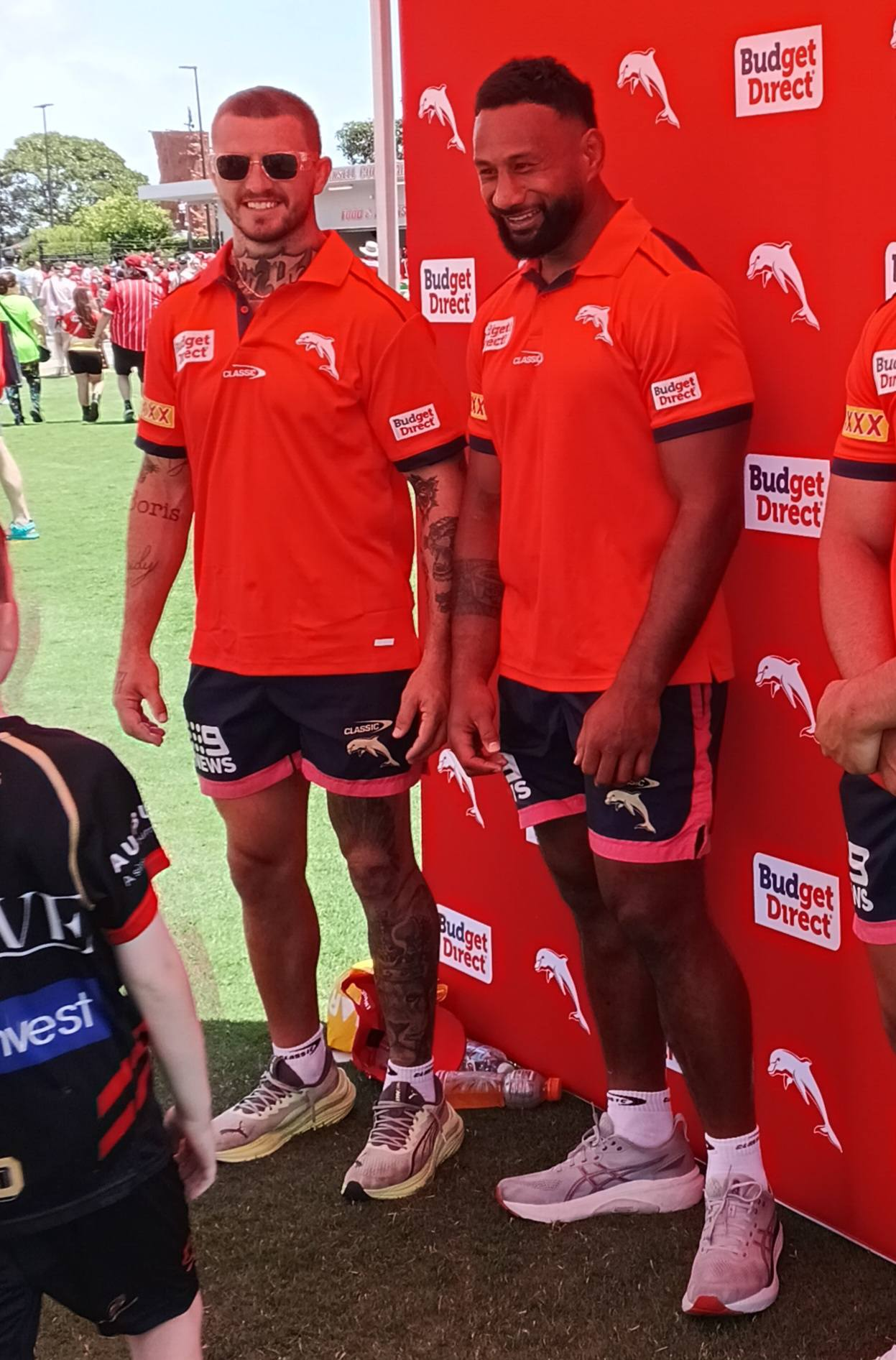

Personal information
- Full name: Francis Molo
- Born: 3 September 1994 (age 32) Auckland, New Zealand
- Height: 183 cm (6 ft 0 in)
- Weight: 112 kg (17 st 9 lb)

Playing information
- Position: Prop, Lock
Club
Years	Team	Pld	T	G	FG	P
2014–15	Brisbane Broncos	6	0	0	0	0
2018–21	North Qld Cowboys	70	6	0	0	24
2022–24	St. George Illawarra	62	4	0	0	16
2025–26	Dolphins	38	1	0	0	4
2027–	Leigh Leopards	0	0	0	0	0
	Total	176	11	0	0	44
Representative
Years	Team	Pld	T	G	FG	P
2015–16	Cook Islands	2	0	0	0	0
2021	Queensland	2	0	0	0	0
2022–	Samoa	10	1	0	0	4
- Source: As of 16 November 2026
- Education: Wavell State High School
- Relatives: Michael Molo (brother); Anthony Milford (cousin)

Francis Molo (born 3 September 1994) is a professional rugby league footballer who plays as a prop for the Leigh Leopards in the Super League.

He previously played for the St. George Illawarra Dragons, the North Queensland Cowboys, Brisbane Broncos and Dolphins in the NRL, as well as the Queensland Maroons.

At international level, Molo has played for both the Cook Islands and Samoa.

== Background ==
Molo was born in Auckland, New Zealand, and moved to Australia, Brisbane when he was 10 months old. He is of Samoan and Cook Island descent. He is the older brother of Michael Molo and cousins with Anthony Milford.

Molo played junior football for the Aspley Devils and attended Wavell State High School, before being signed by the Brisbane Broncos.

== Playing career ==
=== Early career ===
In 2010, Molo played for the Norths Devils' Cyril Connell Cup side and played for the Queensland under-16s team. In 2011, he moved up to the Devils' Mal Meninga Cup side and was selected to play for the Queensland under-18s team.

From 2012 to 2014, Molo played for the Brisbane Broncos' NYC team.

In 2012, he once again represented the Queensland under-18s team. On 20 April 2013, he played for the Queensland under-20s team against the New South Wales under-20s team.

=== Brisbane Broncos (2014-15) ===
In Round 11 of the 2014 NRL season, Molo made his NRL debut for the Brisbane Broncos against the Wests Tigers. In May, he again played for the Queensland under-20s team against the New South Wales under-20s team.

On 20 June, while playing for the Broncos' feeder club, the Norths Devils against the Sunshine Coast Falcons in the Intrust Super Cup, Molo was involved in a tackle on opposition player James Ackerman, which resulted in the death of Ackerman on 22 June 2015. He received an eight-week suspension for the tackle by the QRL judiciary. On 17 September, Molo played for the Cook Islands against Tonga for the World Cup qualifier.

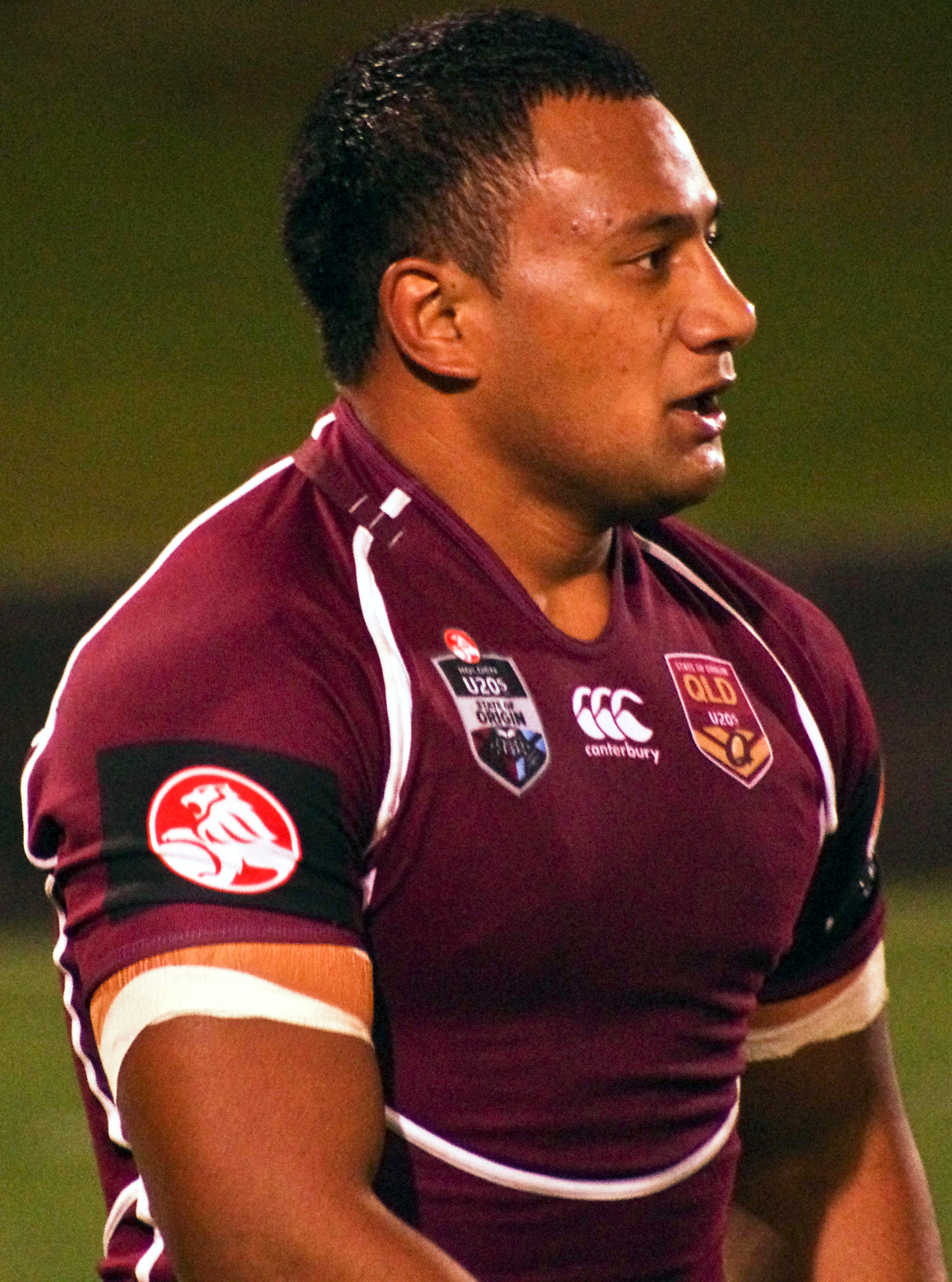
Molo in 2013

=== 2016 ===
On 8 May 2016, Molo started at prop in the Cook Islands 30–20 win over Lebanon.

In July, while playing for the Devils, Molo received a three-game suspension for a shoulder charge against the Sunshine Coast Falcons. A brawl broke out following the tackle, with Sunshine Coast players reportedly calling Molo a "killer". Two Sunshine Coast players were also suspended, for attacking Molo. It came after being suspended three weeks earlier for a similar incident.

=== North Queensland Cowboys (2018-2021) ===
On 20 July 2017, Molo was released from his contract with the Brisbane club and joined the Townsville Blackhawks mid-season. On 24 October, Molo signed a one-year deal with the North Queensland Cowboys after training with their first grade squad while playing for the Blackhawks. In Round 11 of the 2018 NRL season, Molo made his debut for North Queensland in their 20–19 loss to South Sydney. It was his first NRL game in almost three years. On 28 June, he re-signed with the North Queensland club for two more seasons.Molo played the majority of the 2018 season with the Townsville Blackhawks, registering seven NRL games in his first season with North Queensland.

Molo enjoyed a breakout season in 2019, coming off the bench in all 24 of the Cowboys' games. In Round 13, he scored his first NRL try in North Queensland's 20–22 loss to the Manly-Warringah Sea Eagles. On 18 September, he won the Cowboys' 2019 Coach's Award at the club's presentation night. On 2 October, Molo was nominated for Dally M Interchange Player of the Year at the 2019 Dally M Awards.

On 31 July 2020, Molo re-signed with the North Queensland Cowboys until the end of the 2021 season. In Round 4, he started for the first time at prop in a 16–26 loss to the Cronulla-Sutherland Sharks. In Round 13, he played his 50th NRL game in a 10–30 loss to the Gold Coast Titans. For the second consecutive season, he played every game for North Queensland, starting eleven of them and scoring three tries.

=== St. George Illawarra Dragons (2022-2024) ===
On 16 March 2021, Molo signed with the St. George Illawarra Dragons on a three-year deal commencing from the 2022 NRL season. During the annual Anzac Day Cup between the St. George Illawarra Dragons and the Sydney Roosters on 25 April 2022, Molo scored his first try for the Red V in the 11th Minute with the Saints winning 14-12 for the first time since 2018. Molo played a total of twenty-one games for the club in the 2022 NRL season which saw them finish 10th on the table and miss the finals.

On 23 February 2023, Molo pleaded guilty to a domestic violence charge. He did not appear in Port Kembla court on 22 February where he pleaded guilty to one count of stalk/intimidate with intent to cause fear of physical harm. St. George Illawarra released a statement claiming the plea related to an incident at Molo's home on 17 December 2022. Molo played a total of eighteen games for St. George Illawarra in the 2023 NRL season as they finished 16th on the table.

In the 2024 NRL season, Molo played twenty-three games for St. George Illawarra as the club finished 11th on the table.

=== Dolphins (2025-present) ===
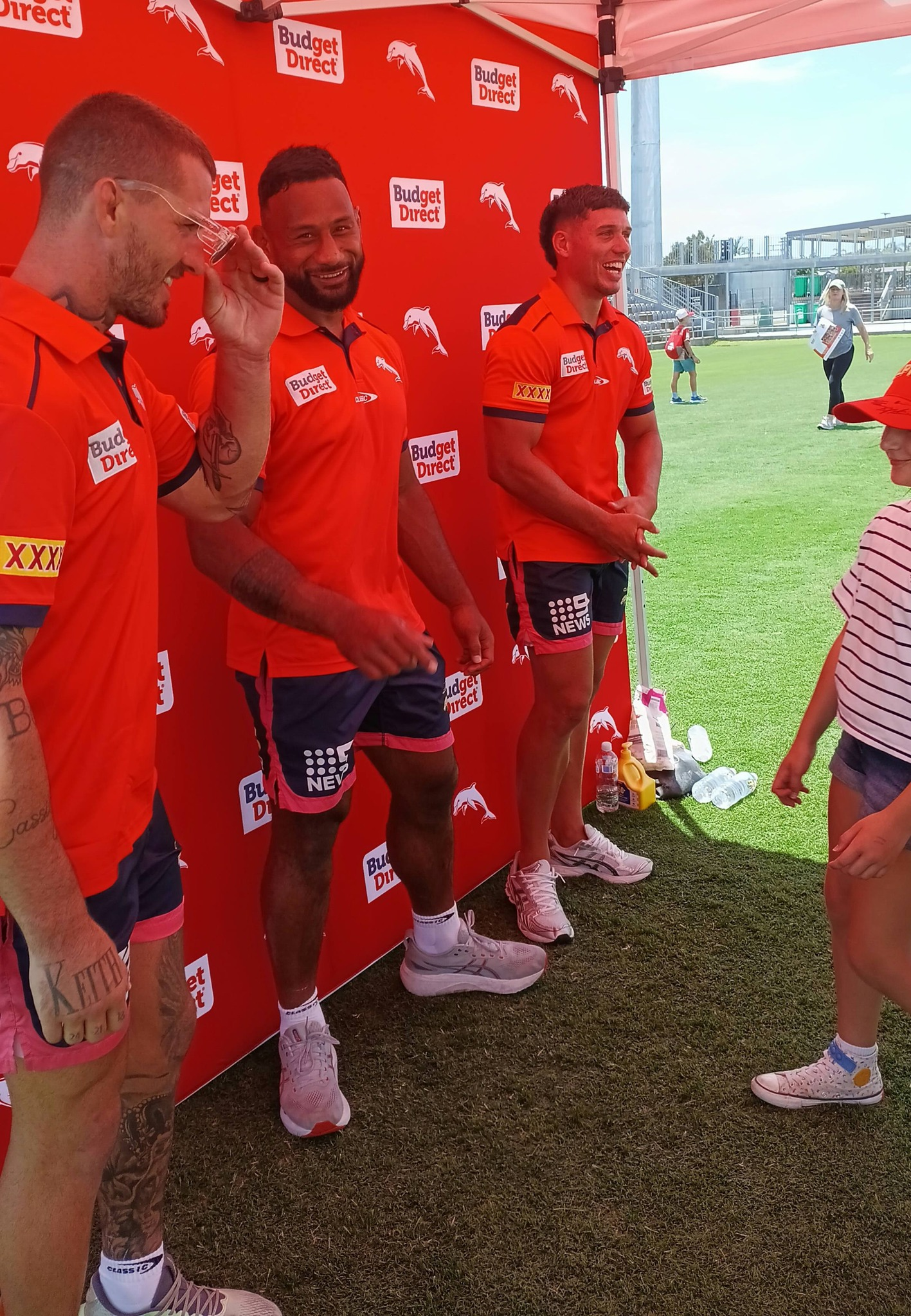
Molo (centre) with other Dolphins players in 2026

On 22 January 2025, it was announced that Molo had been granted mental health leave from the Dragons. Molo had not returned to training as it had been divulged that he had a disagreement with a member of the Dragons coaching staff. On 18 March, the Dragons and Molo had officially parted ways with the club releasing him from the remainder of his contract. Molo later signed a deal to join on with the Dolphins. The Dragons would not officially release Molo until he had paid the club back a settlement for leaving in the middle of his contract. On 27 March, the Dolphins officially announced that they had signed Molo for the rest of 2025 and the 2026 season.

On 2 June 2026, the Dolphins announced that Molo re-signed with the club until the end of 2028. Molo played 22 matches for the club in the 2026 NRL season including their preliminary final loss to eventual premiers the Sydney Roosters.

=== Leigh Leopards ===
On 9 November 2026 it was reported that he had signed for Leigh Leopards in the Super League

== Achievements and accolades ==
=== Individual ===
- North Queensland Cowboys Coach's Award: 2019

== Statistics ==
=== NRL ===
Season	Team	Matches	T	Kills	F/G	Pts
2014	Brisbane Broncos	1	0			0
2015	Brisbane Broncos	5	0	1		0
2018	North Queensland Cowboys	7	0			0
2019	North Queensland Cowboys	24	2			8
2020	North Queensland Cowboys	20	3			12
2021	North Queensland Cowboys	19	1			4
2022	St. George Illawarra Dragons	21	1			4
2023	St. George Illawarra Dragons	18	2			8
2024	St. George Illawarra Dragons	23	1			4
2025	Dolphins	16	1			4
2026	Dolphins	22				
2027	Dolphins					
Career totals		176	11	—	—	44

=== Representative ===
Season	Team	Matches	T	G	GK %	F/G	Pts
2015	Cook Islands	1	0	0	—	0	0
2016	Cook Islands	1	0	0	—	0	0
2021	Queensland Maroons	2					
2022	Samoa	1					
2025	Samoa	1					
Career totals		6	0	0	—	0	0
