= Eddie Blacker =

Australian rugby league footballer

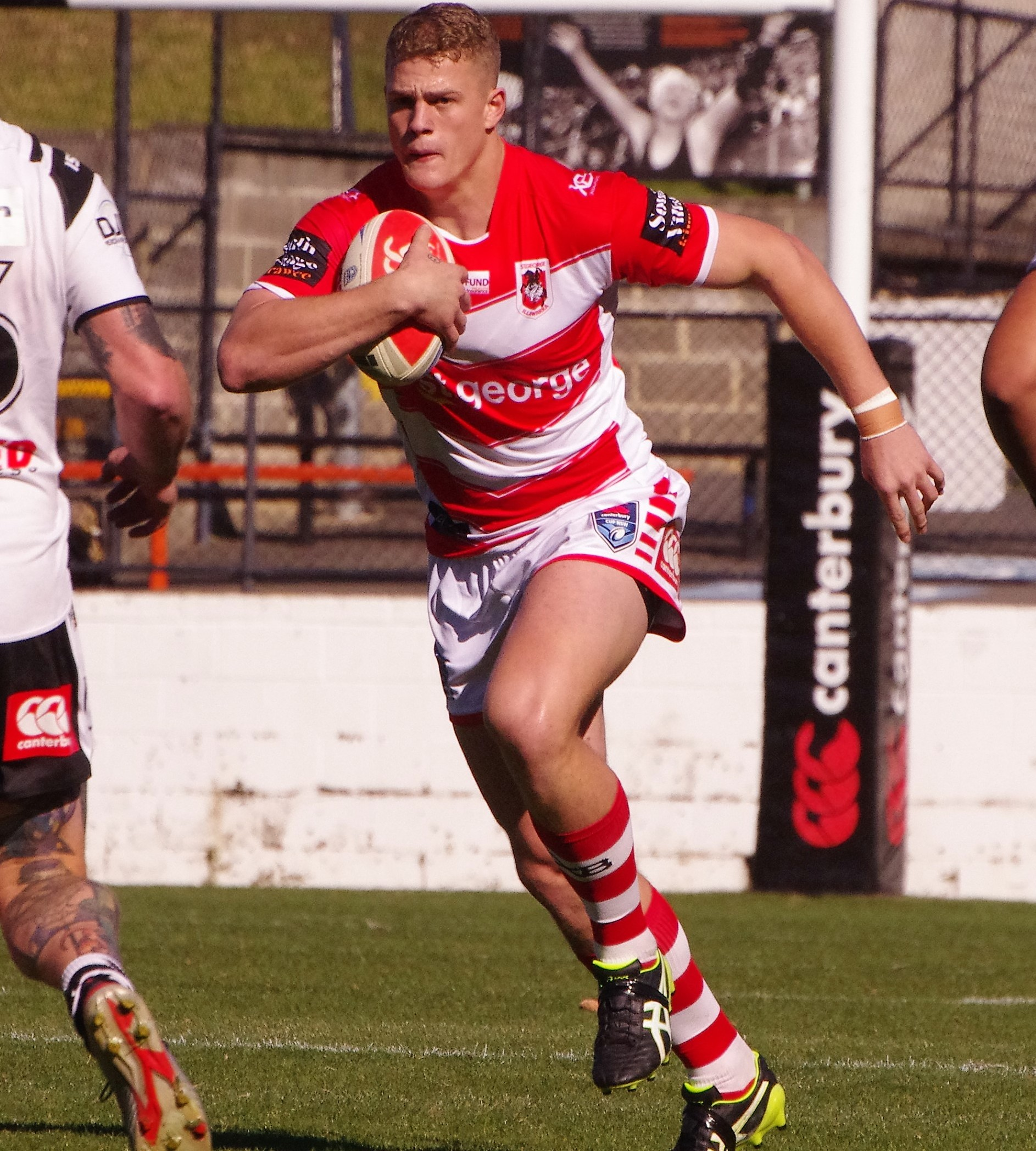

Personal information
- Full name: Edward Blacker
- Born: 15 December 1999 (age 26) Brisbane, Queensland, Australia
- Height: 195 cm (6 ft 5 in)
- Weight: 116 kg (18 st 4 lb)

Playing information
- Position: Prop
Club
Years	Team	Pld	T	G	FG	P
2020	St. George Illawarra	1	0	0	0	0
2022–23	Penrith Panthers	1	0	0	0	0
	Total	2	0	0	0	0
- Source: As of 21 July 2022

Eddie Blacker (born 15 December 1999) is a retired professional rugby league footballer who plays as a prop for the Norths Devils in the Queensland Cup.

Blacker previously played for the St George Illawarra Dragons and the Penrith Panthers in the NRL.

== Career ==
=== Early career ===
Blacker played his junior rugby league at the Pine Rivers Bears in Brisbane Rugby League.

Blacker joined St. George Illawarra Dragons from the Brisbane Broncos Under-20s in 2019.

=== 2020 ===
Blacker made his debut for St. George Illawarra against the Melbourne Storm in round 20 of the 2020 NRL season.

=== 2021 ===
On 7 April it was announced that Blacker had signed with Penrith in a player swap with Billy Burns who had signed with St. George.

=== 2022 ===
On 24 June, Penrith announced the re-signing of Blacker for the 2023 NRL season.

=== 2023 ===
At the end of the 2023 NRL season, he was released by the Penrith Panthers.

=== 2024 ===
On 13 October 2024 Blacker announced his retirement from rugby league after playing the season in the Queensland Cup playing for the Norths Devils.
