= Josh Coric =

Australian rugby league footballer (born 2002)

Personal information
- Full name: Joshua Coric
- Born: 21 April 2002 (age 24)

Playing information
- Position: Prop, Lock
Club
Years	Team	Pld	T	G	FG	P
2026	Brisbane Broncos	1	0	0	0	0
2027	Hull F.C.
	Total	1	0	0	0	0
- Source: RLP As of 16 November 2026

Joshua Coric (born 21 April 2002) is an Australian professional rugby league footballer for Hull F.C. in the Super League. He previously played for the Brisbane Broncos in the National Rugby League.

A forward, Coric was first contracted with the St. George Illawarra Dragons, playing in the Steelers juniors sides, as well as for the Dragons in the NSW Cup, between 2018 and 2024. After leaving for Queensland in 2025, Coric had two seasons in the Queensland Cup with Wynnum-Manly. He made a solitary first-grade appearance for the Brisbane Broncos during the 2026 NRL season, when he was utilised off the bench against the Cronulla Sharks at Suncorp. His debut came at the relatively late age of 24.

Coric left the Broncos for Hull at the end of the 2026 NRL season, signing a two-year contract.
