= Michael Molo =

Australian rugby league footballer (born 1997)

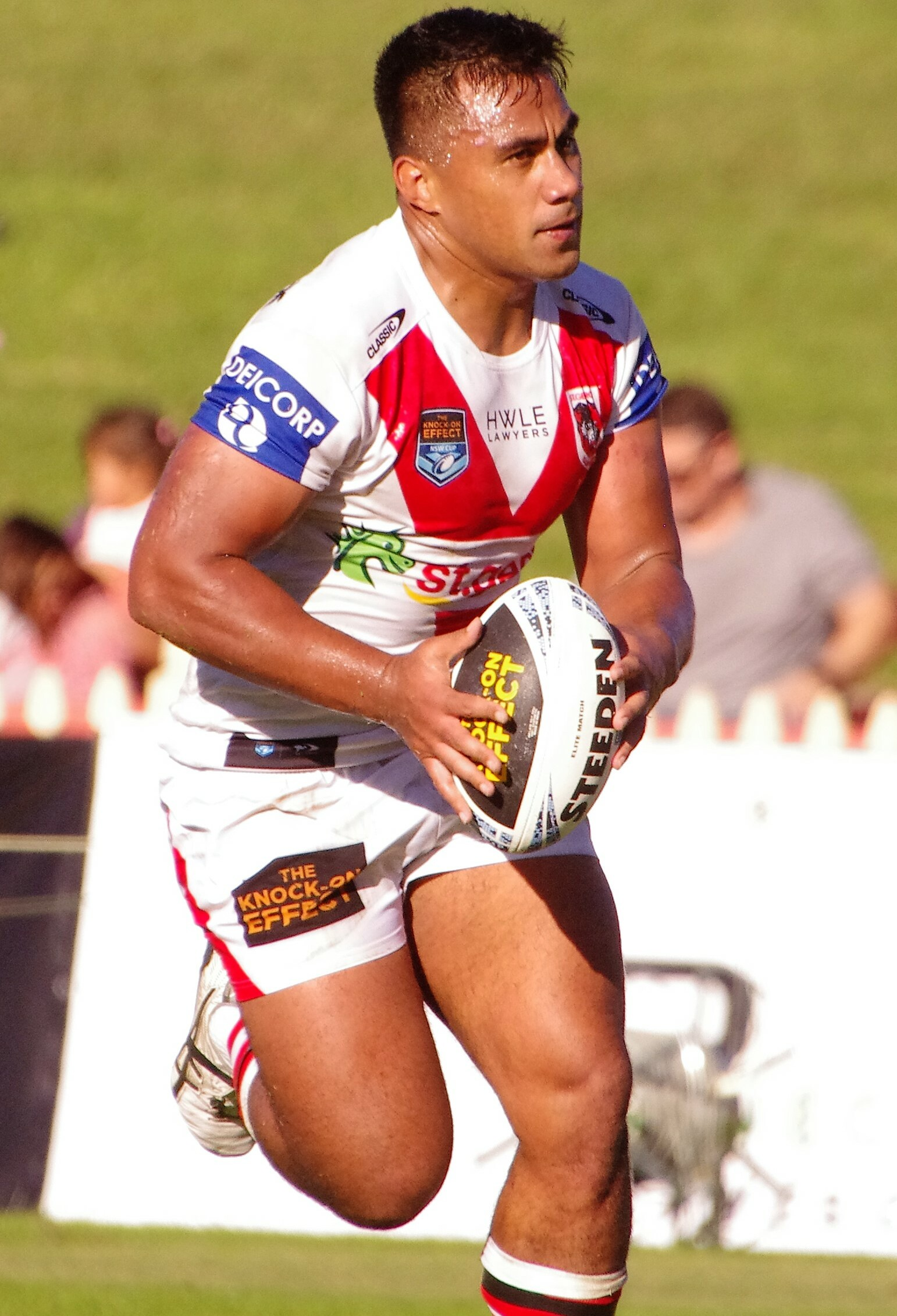

Personal information
- Full name: Michael Molo
- Born: 7 February 1997 (age 29) Brisbane, Queensland, Australia
- Height: 180 cm (5 ft 11 in)
- Weight: 105 kg (16 st 7 lb)

Playing information
- Position: Prop, Lock, Second-row
Club
| Years | Team | Pld | T | G | FG | P |
|---|---|---|---|---|---|---|
| 2022–25 | St. George Illawarra | 36 | 2 | 0 | 0 | 8 |
Representative
| Years | Team | Pld | T | G | FG | P |
| 2023 | Prime Minister's XIII | 1 | 0 | 0 | 0 | 0 |
- Source: As of 2 August 2025
- Education: Wavell State High School
- Relatives: Francis Molo (brother); Anthony Milford (cousin)

Michael Molo (born 7 February 1997) is a professional rugby league footballer who plays as a prop or lock forward for the Ipswich Jets in the Hostplus Cup. He previously played for the St. George Illawarra Dragons in the National Rugby League (NRL).

== Background ==
Molo was born in Brisbane, Queensland. Australia. He attended Wavell State High School. He is of Samoan and Cook Islands descent and is the younger brother of Francis Molo. He is cousins with Toa Samoa captain Anthony Milford.

He played his junior football for the Aspley Devils, before being signed by the Norths Devils.

== Playing career ==
=== 2022 ===
Molo made his debut in round 11 of the 2022 NRL season for St. George Illawarra in their 24–18 victory over the New Zealand Warriors at Jubilee Oval, Molo also scored a try on debut.

=== 2023 & 2024 ===
Molo would play a total of 19 games for St. George Illawarra in the 2023 NRL season as they finished 16th on the table. Molo made only four appearances for St. George Illawarra in the 2024 NRL seasonHe spent the majority of the year with the clubs NSW Cup team.

=== 2025 ===
At the conclusion of St. George Illawarra's season, Molo was released by the club. Michael is on a train and trial with Gold Coast Titans for season 2026.

== Statistics ==
| Season | Team | Pld | T | G | FG | P |
|---|---|---|---|---|---|---|
| 2022 | St. George Illawarra Dragons | 8 | 1 | - | - | 4 |
| 2023 | St. George Illawarra Dragons | 19 | 1 | 0 | 0 | 4 |
| 2024 | St. George Illawarra Dragons | 4 | | | | |
| 2025 | St. George Illawarra Dragons | 5 | | | | |
| | Totals | 36 | 2 | 0 | 0 | 8 |
