= Tyrell Sloan =

Australian rugby league footballer

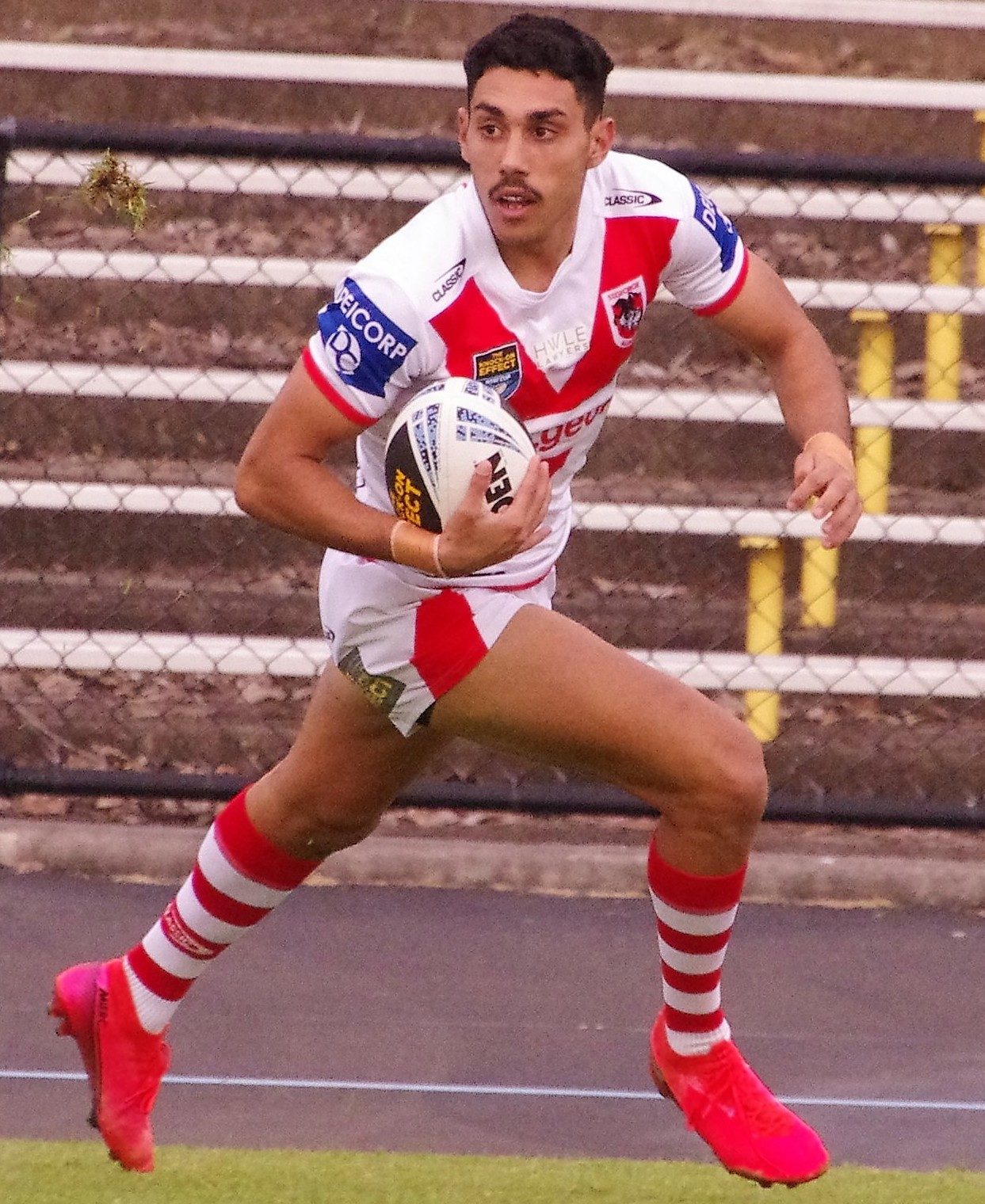

Personal information
- Born: 3 June 2002 (age 24) Campbelltown, New South Wales, Australia
- Height: 185 cm (6 ft 1 in)
- Weight: 89 kg (14 st 0 lb)

Playing information
- Position: Fullback, Wing
Club
Years	Team	Pld	T	G	FG	P
2021–26	St. George Illawarra	97	59	0	1	238
2027–	Castleford Tigers	0	0	0	0	0
	Total	97	59	0	1	238
Representative
Years	Team	Pld	T	G	FG	P
2022–23	Indigenous All Stars	2	2	0	0	8
2023	Prime Minister's XIII	1	1	0	0	4
- Source: As of 6 November 2026

Tyrell Sloan (born 3 June 2002) is an Australian professional rugby league footballer who plays as a fullback or winger for the Castleford Tigers in the Super League.

== Background ==
Sloan was born in Campbelltown, New South Wales and is of Indigenous Australian (Wiradjuri) background.

Sloan played his junior rugby league for the Dapto Canaries.

== Playing career ==
=== 2021 ===
Prior to the start of the 2021 NRL season, Sloan signed a three-year contract with the St. George Illawarra Dragons as a development player.

In round 15 of the 2021 NRL season, Sloan made his first grade debut for St. George Illawarra against the Canberra Raiders, scoring a try in a comeback 22–20 victory at WIN Stadium.

Sloan played a total of five matches for St. George Illawarra in the 2021 NRL season. He scored six tries for 24 points. As the club finished 11th on the table and missed out on the finals for their third year in a row.

=== 2022 ===
After St. George Illawarra's round 3 loss to arch-rivals Cronulla, Sloan was demoted to the NSW Cup by head coach Anthony Griffin. Fox League pundit Matthew Johns described Sloan's demotion as "Insanity". After spending two months in reserve grade, Sloan was recalled to the first grade team for their Magic Round match against the Gold Coast. The club would go on to lose the match with Sloan being cited for making key errors which led to Gold Coast tries. The following week, Sloan was again demoted to the NSW Cup. Sloan played a total of eight matches for St. George Illawarra in the 2022 NRL season. He scored one try for the season.

=== 2023 ===
Sloan would play a total of 23 games for St. George Illawarra in the 2023 NRL season and scored ten tries as they finished 16th on the table.

Sloan in 2026

=== 2024 ===
In round 1 of the 2024 NRL season, Sloan scored a hat-trick in St. George Illawarra's upset 28-4 victory over the Gold Coast.

Sloan played 23 games for St. George Illawarra in the 2024 NRL season and scored 13 tries as the club finished 11th on the table.

=== 2025 ===
In the 2025 NRL season, with Clint Gutherson joining the club and taking the fullback spot, Sloan moved to the wing. In round 14, Sloan was demoted from the starting team and replaced with Christian Tuipulotu. On 24 June, Sloan was reportedly given permission by St. George Illawarra to negotiate with other clubs. Sloan played 20 games for St. George Illawarra in the 2025 NRL season and scored 17 tries as the club finished a disappointing 15th on the table.

=== 2026 ===
On 3 July, Castleford announced that they had signed Sloan on a two-year deal from the 2027 Super League season. On 16 August, when Andrew Johns labelled him "too good a player to be leaving the NRL at this age," Sloan said of his departure, "It's something I didn't want to do, but unfortunately that's how the footy world works and the decision was made a few months ago and there's a bit in the background going on with Carry over there. It's a tough decision to leave home but I'm looking forward to it, particularly with having Cookie over there too." He played 17 matches for St. George Illawarra in the 2026 NRL season as the club finished with the Wooden Spoon. Sloan played 17 matches for St. George Illawarra in the 2026 NRL season as the club finished with the Wooden Spoon. It was the clubs first wooden spoon and the first any St. George affiliated side had received since 1938.

== Statistics ==
Year	Team	Games	Tries	Pts
2021	St. George Illawarra Dragons	5	6	24
2022	St. George Illawarra Dragons	8	1	4
2023	St. George Illawarra Dragons	23	10	40
2024	St. George Illawarra Dragons	23	13	52
2025	St. George Illawarra Dragons	20	17	68
2026	St. George Illawarra Dragons	17	11	44
2027*	Castleford Tigers			
	Totals	96	58	232

*denotes season competing
