= Poasa Faamausili =

New Zealand rugby league footballer

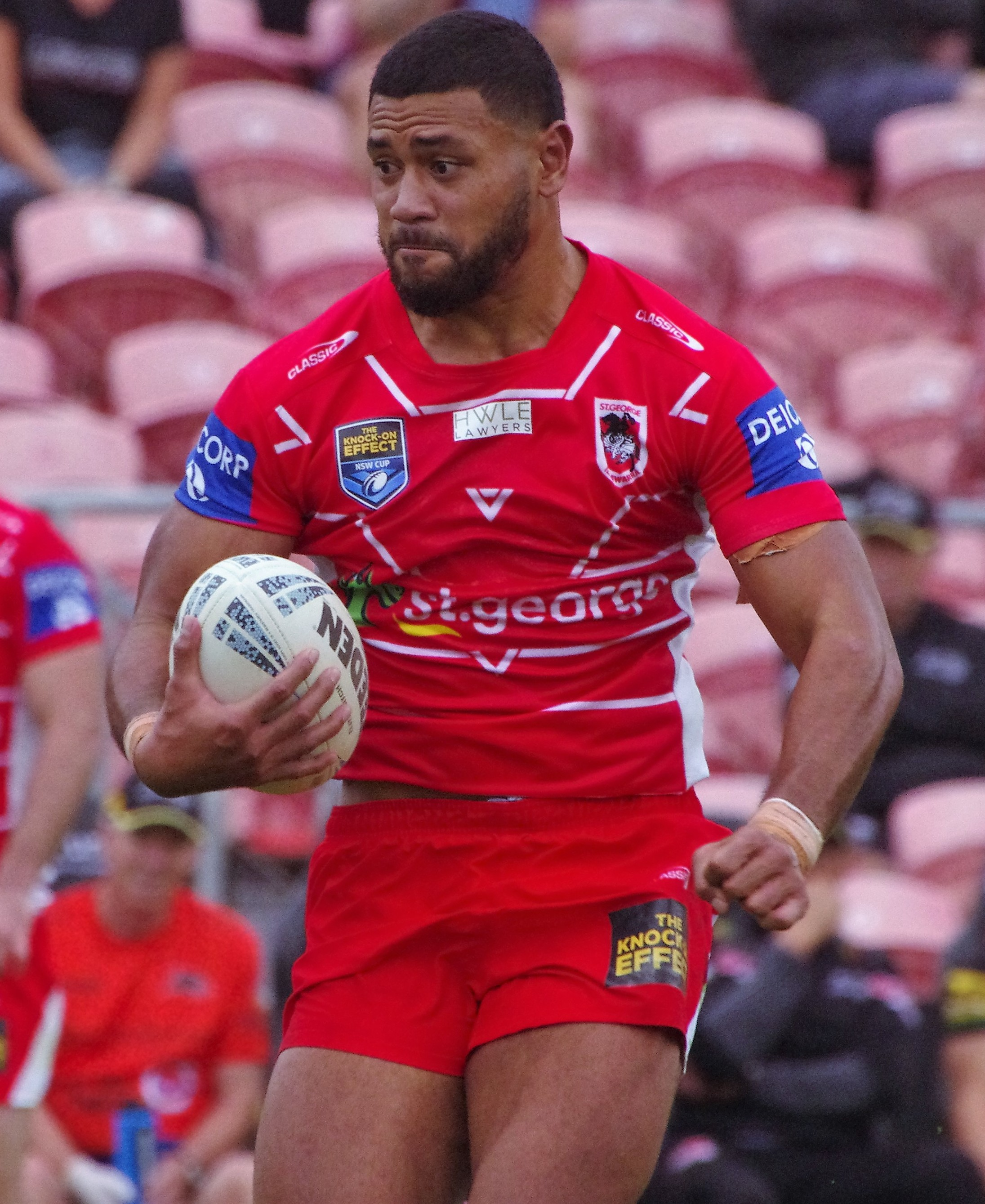

Personal information
- Born: 14 February 1996 (age 30) Auckland, New Zealand
- Height: 188 cm (6 ft 2 in)
- Weight: 108 kg (17 st 0 lb)

Playing information
- Position: Prop
Club
Years	Team	Pld	T	G	FG	P
2018–20	Sydney Roosters	24	1	0	0	4
2020(loan)	→ New Zealand Warriors	4	0	0	0	0
2021–22	St. George Illawarra	11	0	0	0	0
2023	Dolphins	4	0	0	0	0
2024	Canterbury Bulldogs	4	0	0	0	0
	Total	47	1	0	0	4
- Source: As of 17 May 2024

Poasa Faamausili (born 14 February 1996) is a New Zealand former professional rugby league footballer who last played as a prop for the Canterbury-Bankstown Bulldogs.

He previously played for the Dolphins, the St. George Illawarra Dragons, the Sydney Roosters and the New Zealand Warriors in the NRL.

== Background ==
Faamausili was born in Auckland, New Zealand, and is of Samoan descent. He attended Waitakere College and played junior rugby league for the Glenora Bears in the Auckland Rugby League competition.

== Playing career ==
=== Early career (2014-2016) ===
Faamausili played in the Sydney Roosters’ Holden Cup side from 2014 to 2016. Faamausili started in the front row in the Sydney Roosters’ 2016 Holden Cup premiership winning team.

=== Sydney Roosters (2018-2020) ===
Faamausili made his first-grade debut in round 18 of the 2018 NRL season against the Gold Coast Titans.

=== New Zealand Warriors (2020) ===
In the 2020 NRL season, Faamausili was loaned to the New Zealand Warriors.

=== St. George Illawarra Dragons (2021-2022) ===
On 15 October 2020, Faamausili signed a two-year deal with the St. George Illawarra Dragons, becoming Anthony Griffin's first signing at the club. He made his debut for St. George Illawarra in round 1 of the 2021 NRL season against the Cronulla-Sutherland Sharks.

Faamausili played eleven matches for St. George in the 2021 NRL season. He did not play any games for them during the 2022 NRL season.

=== Dolphins (2023) ===
In the 2023 NRL season, Faamausili made his club debut in round 4 with the Dolphins against the Brisbane Broncos at Suncorp Stadium, and played in four games at national level. Otherwise, he was with the Redcliffe Dolphins in the Queensland Cup state competition.

=== Canterbury-Bankstown Bulldogs (2024) ===
In November 2023, Faamausili signed a two-year contract with the Canterbury-Bankstown Bulldogs for the 2024 NRL season onwards.

=== Retirement ===
On 14 October 2024, Faamasuili would announced his retirement from rugby league after playing seven seasons.

== Post playing ==
After retiring from the NRL, Faamasuili signed to play for the Narellan Jets in the Group 6 Rugby League Competition.
