= Jaiyden Hunt =

Australian rugby league footballer (born 1998)

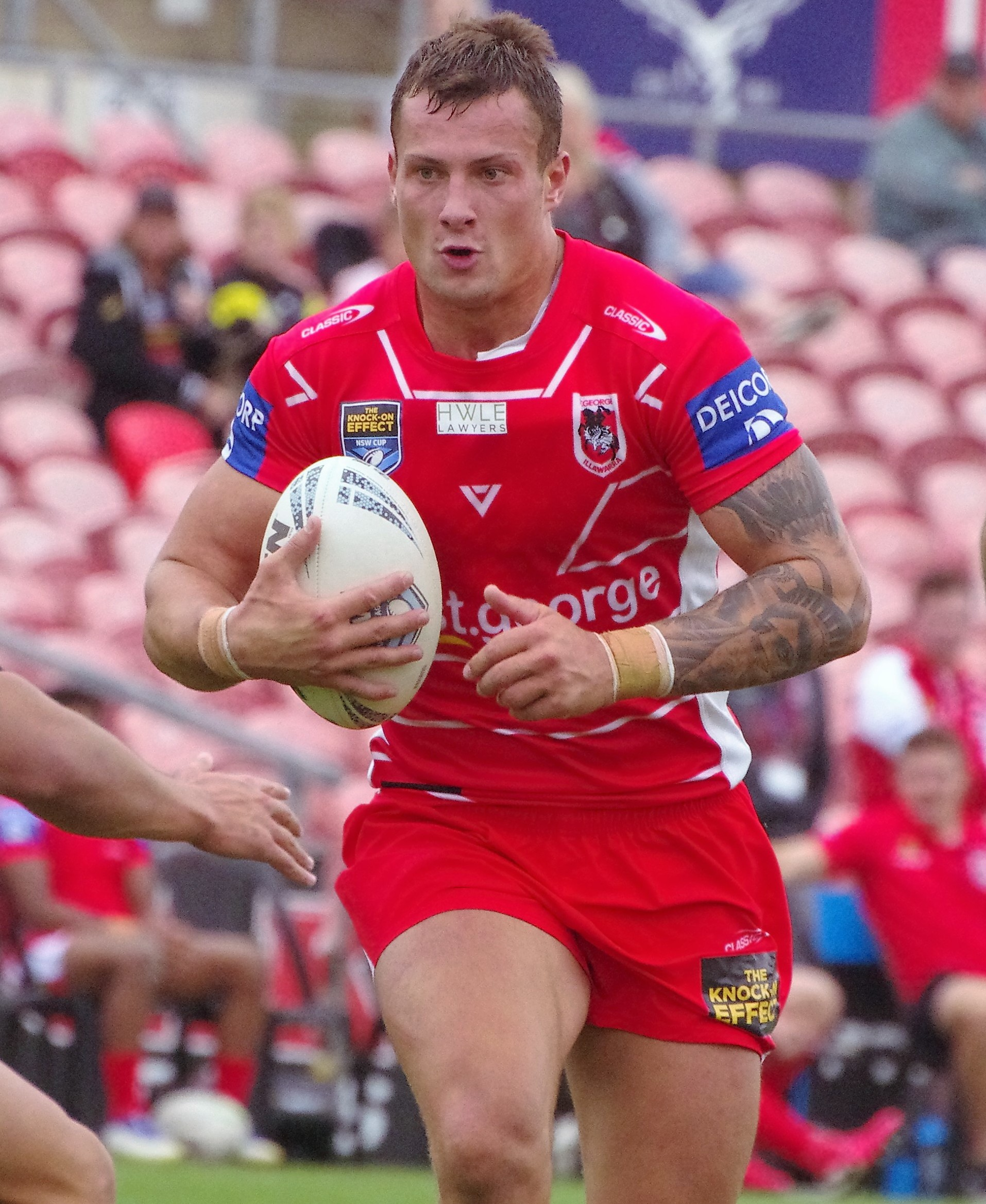

Personal information
- Born: 20 July 1998 (age 28) Brisbane, Queensland, Australia
- Height: 191 cm (6 ft 3 in)
- Weight: 111 kg (17 st 7 lb)

Playing information
- Position: Second-row, Prop
Club
Years	Team	Pld	T	G	FG	P
2021–23	St. George Illawarra	14	1	0	0	4
2024–26	Brisbane Broncos	26	0	0	0	0
2027–	Canberra Raiders	0	0	0	0	0
	Total	40	1	0	0	4
- Source: As of 15 September 2026

Jaiyden Hunt (born 20 July 1998) is an Australian rugby league footballer who plays as a second-row forward for the Canberra Raiders in the National Rugby League (NRL).

== Background ==
Hunt was born in Brisbane, Queensland, Australia.

Hunt has American heritage through his grandparents.

He played his junior rugby league with St Brendans Brothers and the Easts Tigers before being signed by the Melbourne Storm.

Hunt attended St Thomas More College, Sunnybank for his secondary education.

== Playing career ==
In 2014, Hunt played for the Easts Tigers in the Cyril Connell Cup before moving up to their Mal Meninga Cup team in 2015.

In 2016 and 2017, Hunt played for the Melbourne Storm in the Holden Cup. In 2018, he re-joined the Easts Tigers, playing in the Queensland Cup and Hastings Deering Colts.

=== 2021 ===
In 2021, Hunt joined the St. George Illawarra Dragons on a train and trial contract and began playing for their NSW Cup team.

In Round 11 of the 2021 NRL season, Hunt made his NRL debut for St. George Illawarra against fierce rivals Cronulla-Sutherland at Kogarah Oval.

=== 2023 ===
In round 15 of the 2023 NRL season, Hunt scored his first NRL try for St. George Illawarra Dragons against South Sydney Rabbitohs in a 36–30 win at Kogarah Oval.

=== 2024 ===
Hunt played five matches for Brisbane in the 2024 NRL season which saw the club miss the finals finishing 12th on the table.

=== 2025 ===
On 22 September 2025, the Brisbane outfit announced that Hunt signed a one year extension with the club. Hunt played 12 games for Brisbane in the 2025 NRL season but did not feature in the clubs 2025 NRL Grand Final in which Brisbane defeated Melbourne 26-22.

=== 2026 ===
On 22 September 2026, the Raiders announced the two year signing of Hunt.

== Statistics ==
Season	Team	Pld	T	G	FG	P
2021	St. George Illawarra Dragons	4	–	–	–	0
2022	St. George Illawarra Dragons	3	–	–	–	0
2023	St. George Illawarra Dragons	7	1			4
2024	Brisbane Broncos	5				
2025	Brisbane Broncos	12				
2026	Brisbane Broncos	9				
2027	Canberra Raiders					
	Totals	40	1	0	0	4
