= Junior Amone =

Tonga international rugby league footballer

Talatau Amone
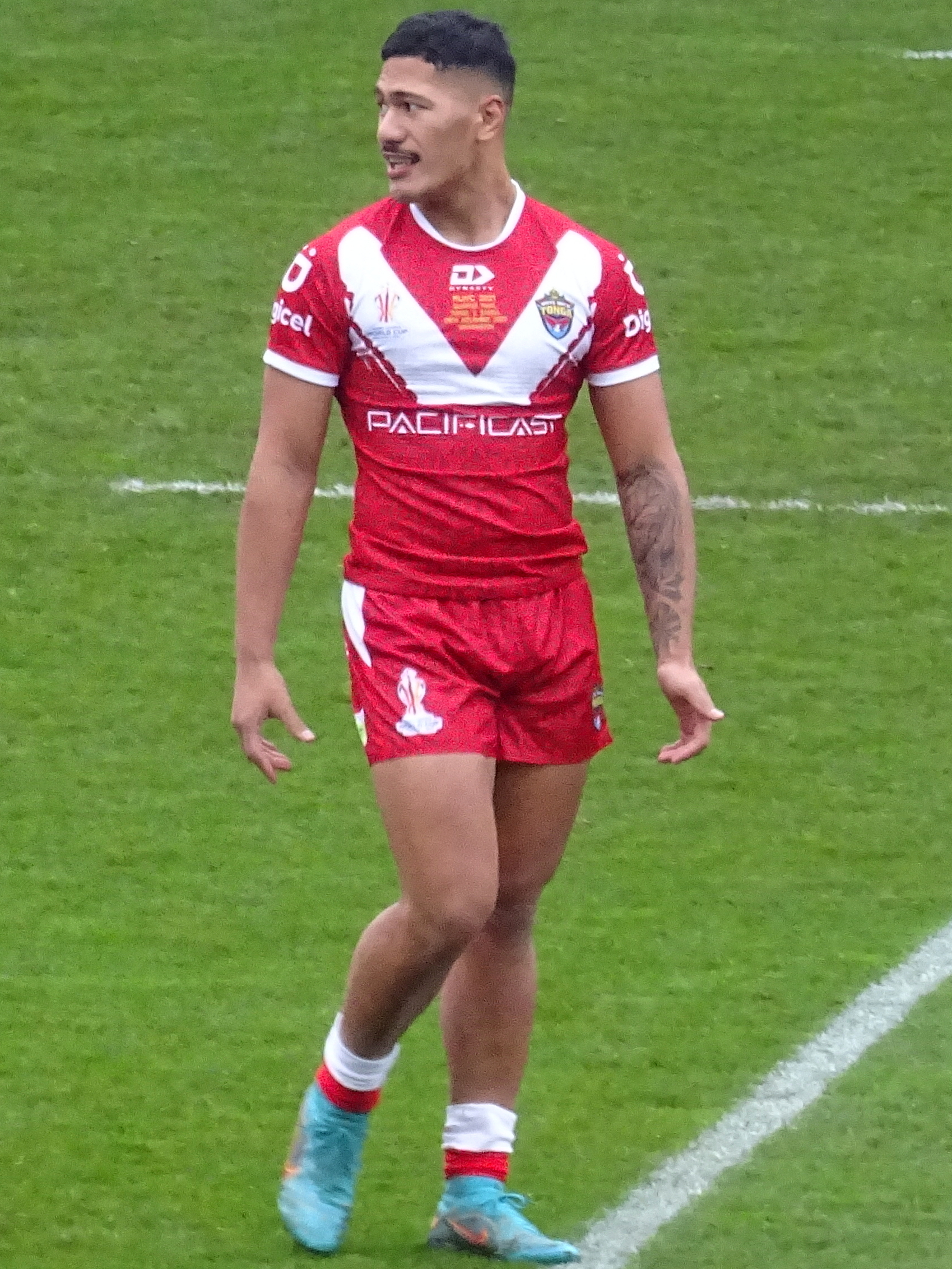

Personal information
- Full name: Talatau Junior Amone
- Born: 10 April 2002 (age 24) Wollongong, New South Wales, Australia
- Height: 184 cm (6 ft 0 in)
- Weight: 89 kg (14 st 0 lb)

Playing information
- Position: Five-eighth
Club
Years	Team	Pld	T	G	FG	P
2021–23	St. George Illawarra	54	10	0	0	40
Representative
Years	Team	Pld	T	G	FG	P
2022–	Tonga	3	1	0	0	4
- Source: As of 10 October 2026

Talatau Junior Amone (born 10 April 2002) is a Tonga international rugby league footballer who last played as a five-eighth for the St. George Illawarra Dragons in the National Rugby League (NRL).

== Background ==
Amone played his junior rugby league for the Western Suburbs Red Devils. He is of Tongan descent.

== Playing career ==
=== 2021 ===
Amone made his debut in round 9 of the 2021 NRL season for St. George Illawarra against Canterbury-Bankstown, scoring a try on debut in a 32-12 victory. Amone made eleven appearances for the club throughout the season as the club finished 11th and missed out on the finals.

=== 2022 ===
In round 22 of the 2022 NRL season, Amone scored a hat-trick in St. George's 24-22 loss against the Canberra Raiders. On Thursday 11 August 2022, Amone signed a Contract Extension with the Saints until the end of the 2024 NRL season. In round 23, Amone scored two tries in a 46-26 victory over the Gold Coast Titans.

=== 2023 ===
Amone played his first game of the season on 1 April after being stood down by the NRL, St. George Illawarra beat the Dolphins 38-12. Amone played 19 games for the club in the 2023 NRL season where they finished 16th on the table.

=== 2025 ===
Junior Amone’s name has been spotted in the Illawarra based local community newspaper "The Bugle" playing rugby for Kiama.

=== 2026 ===
Junior Amone is now playing Rugby League again with his junior rugby league team in the Illawarra rugby league Harrigan Cup comp with the Western Suburbs Red Devils. On the 30th of May 2026, he scored a try against the Thirroul Butches

=== Statistics ===
Season	Team	Pld	T	G	FG	P
2021	St. George Illawarra Dragons	11	3	0	0	12
2022	St. George Illawarra Dragons	24	6	0	0	24
2023	St. George Illawarra Dragons	19	1			4
	Totals	54	10	0	0	40

== Criminal conviction ==
In December 2022, Amone was charged with reckless grievous bodily harm in company, destroying property and intimidation following an alleged attack on a roofing contractor at Warrawong on 15 November 2022. He was initially stood down from playing under the NRL no-fault stand-down policy, but he was allowed to play after his case was moved from the district court to Wollongong Local Court, where he would face a maximum sentence of five years if found guilty on all charges. That maximum sentence is below the threshold of the no-fault stand-down policy. On 18 October 2023 Amone was found guilty of all charges. On 19 December 2023, Amone was served with a breach notice by the NRL preventing him from being contracted in the league for 12 months, after being sentenced to two years imprisonment by way of an intensive corrections order and 300 hours of community service.
