= Anthony Griffin (rugby league) =

Australian rugby league footballer and coach

Personal information
- Born: 26 August 1966 (age 59) Rockhampton, Queensland, Australia

Coaching information
Club
Years	Team	Gms	W	D	L	W%
2011–14	Brisbane Broncos	101	54	1	46	53
2016–18	Penrith Panthers	72	42	0	30	58
2021–23	St. George Illawarra	58	22	0	36	38
	Total	231	118	1	112	51
Representative
Years	Team	Gms	W	D	L	W%
2007	Queensland Residents	1	1	0	0	100
- Source: As of 4 January 2024

Anthony Griffin (born 26 August 1966) is an Australian professional rugby league coach who was most recently the head coach of the St George Illawarra Dragons in the NRL.

After success in the Queensland Cup and Toyota Cup competitions, Griffin replaced Ivan Henjak as head coach of the Brisbane Broncos from 2011 to 2014 and later served as head coach for the Penrith Panthers from 2016 to 2018 and the St. George Illawarra Dragons from 2021 to 2023.

== Early life ==
Griffin was born in Rockhampton, Queensland, and attended Emmaus College in Rockhampton.

== Playing career ==
Griffin played for Past Brothers from 1985 to 1987 in the lower grades, largely as a hooker. He then played for Brothers in Rockhampton from 1988 to 1992.

== Coaching career ==
Griffin coached the colts teams for Redcliffe (1995–97), winning the premiership in 1997. The following year he moved to Brisbane Norths, taking them to the colts premiership in his first year there, and also coaching the Queensland under 17s representative team in 1998. After another colts premiership with Norths in 2000, Griffin joined the coaching staff of the NRL's Melbourne Storm and was Chris Anderson's then Mark Murray's assistant in 2001 and 2002. Returning to Queensland, he coached the Souths Logan Magpies in the Queensland Cup from 2003 to 2004. He then joined the Redcliffe Dolphins, coaching them from 2005 to 2007 and winning the competition with them in 2006. He also coached the Queensland Residents side in 2007.

=== Brisbane Broncos ===
Griffin coached the Brisbane Broncos' under-20s side to the 2008 Toyota Cup (Under-20s) season's Grand Final. He was appointed assistant to head coach Ivan Henjak for the 2010 NRL season, in which the Broncos failed to make the finals series for the first time since 1991.

Less than three weeks from the beginning of the 2011 NRL season, Griffin became the third ever coach of the Broncos when he was unexpectedly announced to be replacing Henjak. After losing their first match, the Broncos went on to win seven matches in a row, to be sitting equal top of the ladder with the St. George Illawarra Dragons at the conclusion of Round 8. Griffin employed a policy of resting key players such as Darren Lockyer and Sam Thaiday after mid-season representative matches and Brisbane's ladder position slipped. However, they returned to the top four after the 2011 State of Origin series. The Broncos finished the regular season in third place, their best finish to the regular season since their last premiership in 2006. Griffin then took them to within one match of the grand final. However without injured captain Darren Lockyer, Brisbane were knocked out of contention by eventual premiers, the Manly-Warringah Sea Eagles.

During the 2014 NRL season, it was announced that Griffin would not be head coach of the Broncos the following season due to the return of the club's foundation coach, Wayne Bennett.

=== Penrith Panthers ===
On 21 October 2015, it was announced that Griffin had accepted the head coaching position with the Penrith Panthers on a three-year deal. On 4 October 2017, Griffin signed a new two-year extension to stay as Penrith coach until the end of 2020 after guiding the club to consecutive finals appearances. On 6 August 2018, Griffin and the Penrith Panthers club decided to part ways with immediate effect, leaving assistant coach Cameron Ciraldo as caretaker coach.

Griffin later came out and said "He hasn’t coached for 20 years. He hasn’t had his head in the fire for 20 years. If there’s anyone old school in the conversation – if I’m in the conversation about being old school, he’d need to be there as well". Griffin then later spoke of Gould claiming that he was sad after a win and happy after a loss. Griffin told the media "We were officially on top of the ladder, having overcome this huge run of injuries earlier in the year, but nothing. When we lost there was always an inquiry, how had we had failed in our preparation, but there was never any inquiry when we won". "I have never seen him so happy than when Brisbane put 50 on us. And then I’ve never seen him so agitated than when we just beat Manly (in a 28-24 thriller at Brookvale Oval on July 28, 2018)".

=== St. George Illawarra Dragons ===
On 7 September 2020, Griffin was appointed head coach of St. George Illawarra. He was granted a two-year contract to begin in 2021, with a third year in the club's favour, following the sacking of Paul McGregor earlier in the 2020 NRL season.

In round 2 of the 2021 NRL season, he earned his first win as St. George head coach as the club defeated the North Queensland Cowboys 25–18 at North Queensland Stadium. In Griffin's first season as head coach, he guided St. George Illawarra to an 11th-place finish on the table. From round 13 to round 25, the club only managed to win two matches and suffered an eight-game losing streak to close out the year, which stands as a current club record for the most consecutive losses.

Before the start of the 2023 NRL season, many experts and pundits predicted St. George Illawarra to finish with the Wooden Spoon. After having a bye in the first round, the club defeated the Gold Coast in round 2 by a score of 32–18. In March 2023, it was revealed that Griffin had been told by club officials that they were looking for a potential coaching replacement in 2024 and that Griffin would have to re-apply for his position. On 16 May 2023, it was announced that St. George Illawarra had terminated Griffin's contract effective immediately. Griffin was informed of the decision at 8AM just before the players' training session with Ryan Carr taking over as interim head-coach.

=== Radio career ===
In 2019, Griffin joined the 2GB Continuous Call Team program as one of the co-commentators for selected matches.

=== Statistics ===
Season	Club	Matches	Wins	Draws	Losses	Win percentage
2011	Brisbane Broncos	27	20	−	7	74%
2012	Brisbane Broncos	25	12	−	13	48%
2013	Brisbane Broncos	24	10	1	13	42%
2014	Brisbane Broncos	26	12	−	13	48%
2016	Penrith Panthers	26	15	−	11	57%
2017	Penrith Panthers	26	14	−	12	54%
2018	Penrith Panthers	20	13	−	7	65%
2021	St. George Illawarra	24	8	−	16	33%
2022	St. George Illawarra	24	12	−	12	50%
2023	St. George Illawarra	10	2	−	8	20%
Total		210	113	1	96	52%
