= Jayden Sullivan =

Australian rugby league footballer

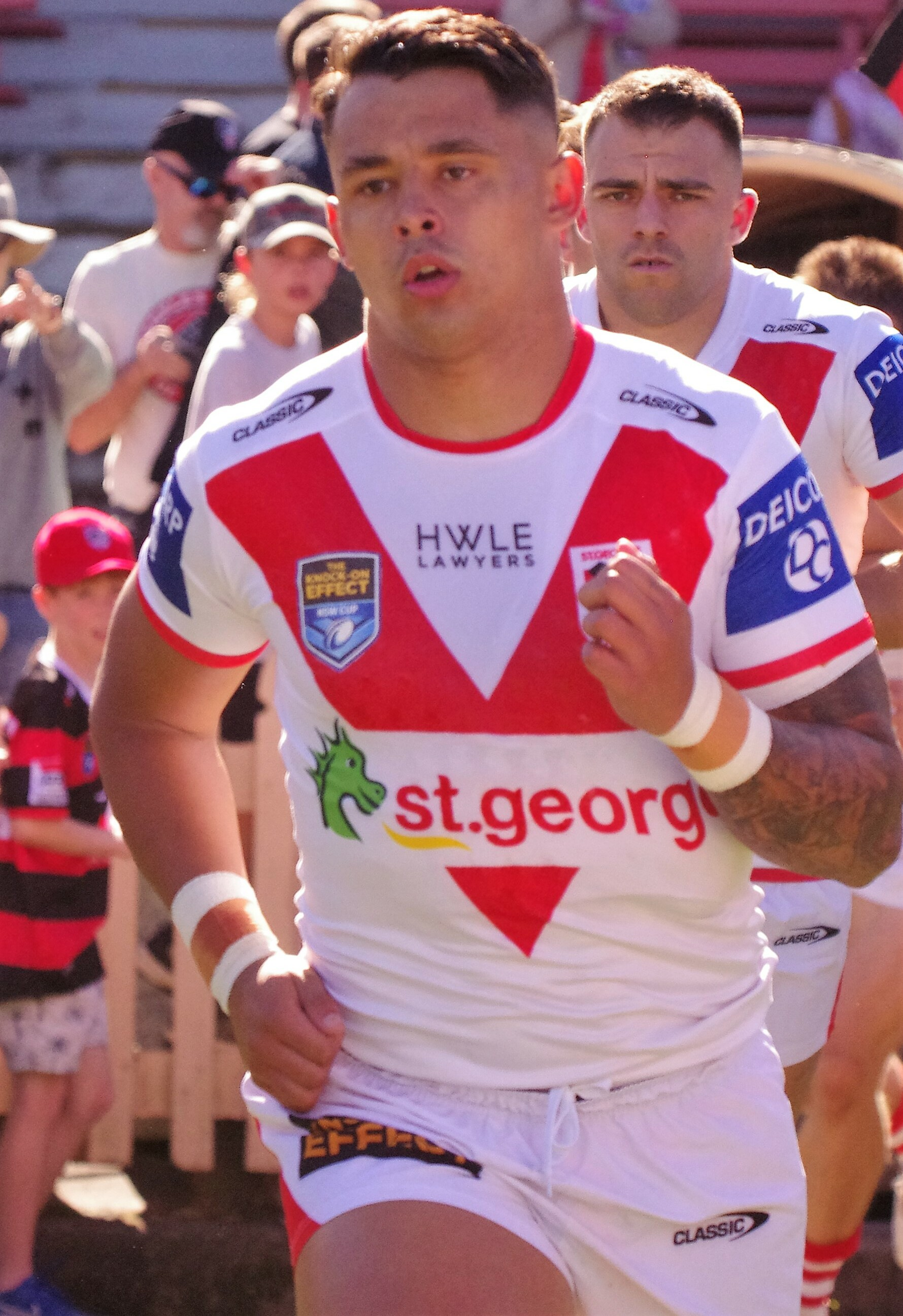

Personal information
- Born: 16 September 2001 (age 25) Port Kembla, New South Wales, Australia
- Height: 174 cm (5 ft 9 in)
- Weight: 80 kg (12 st 8 lb)

Playing information
- Position: Five-eighth, Halfback, Hooker
Club
Years	Team	Pld	T	G	FG	P
2020–23	St. George Illawarra	27	7	3	0	34
2024	Wests Tigers	9	1	3	0	10
2025(loan)	→ South Sydney	13	0	0	0	0
2026–	South Sydney	15	1	8	0	20
	Total	64	9	14	0	64
- Source: As of 6 November 2026

Jayden “Bud” Sullivan (born 16 September 2001) is a professional rugby league footballer who plays as a halfback, five-eighth or hooker for the South Sydney Rabbitohs in the National Rugby League (NRL).

== Background ==
Sullivan was born in Port Kembla NSW and is of Macedonian and Indigenous Australian descent.

== Career ==
=== Early career ===
Sullivan played his junior rugby league at Western Suburbs Red Devils in Illawarra Rugby League.

In 2019, he was selected for the New South Wales Under-18's team after an impressive year where he won the 2019 S. G. Ball Cup with the Illawarra Steelers as captain.

=== 2020 ===
Sullivan made his debut for St. George Illawarra against Melbourne in round 20 of the 2020 NRL season.

=== 2021 ===
Sullivan made five appearances for St. George Illawarra in the 2021 NRL season as the club missed out on the finals by finishing 11th on the table.

=== 2022 ===
Sullivan played nine games for St. George Illawarra in the 2022 NRL season as the club finished 10th on the table and missed the finals.

=== 2023 ===
In round 10 of the 2023 NRL season, Sullivan scored two tries for St. George Illawarra in their 16-18 loss against the bottom placed Wests Tigers.

In July 2023, Sullivan toured the Wests Tigers facilities after he was given permission to speak to other teams.

On 17 August 2023, Sullivan was released from the final years of his contract to sign with the Wests Tigers on a four-year deal.

=== 2024 ===
Sullivan played nine games for the Wests Tigers throughout the 2024 NRL season as the club finished with the Wooden Spoon for a third consecutive year. On 20 December, Sullivan was released by the Wests Tigers. The clubs CEO Shane Richardson said to the media “The only reason we’ve let Jayden go is because you can't have him on that money when we’ve signed Jarome Luai". On the same day, Sullivan signed a contract to join South Sydney ahead of the 2025 NRL season.

=== 2025 ===
On 3 September 2025, it was reported that Sullivan had signed a full time deal with South Sydney for the 2026-27 seasons and would not be returning to the Wests Tigers. Sullivan played 13 matches for South Sydney in the 2025 NRL season which saw the club finish 14th on the table. On 16 October, the Rabbitohs confirmed the two year extension for Sullivan, marking a full time move to the club.

=== 2026 ===
Sullivan played 15 matches for South Sydney in the 2026 NRL season as the club finished 6th on the table and qualified for the finals.

== Statistics ==
Season	Team	Pld	T	G	FG	P
2020	St. George Illawarra Dragons	1	-	-	-	0
2021	St. George Illawarra Dragons	5	2	-	-	8
2022	St. George Illawarra Dragons	9	2	-	-	8
2023	St. George Illawarra Dragons	12	3	3	0	18
2024	Wests Tigers	8	1	3		10
2025	South Sydney Rabbitohs (loan)	14				
2026	South Sydney Rabbitohs	15	1	8		20
2027	South Sydney Rabbitohs					
	Totals	64	9	14	0	64

*denotes season still competing

== Personal life ==
On 12 January 2025, Sullivan received praise after he helped rescue members of a family who were kayaking in Lake Illawarra, Sullivan helped while a rescue team was making their way over to finish off the rescue.
