= Blake Lawrie =

Australian rugby league footballer

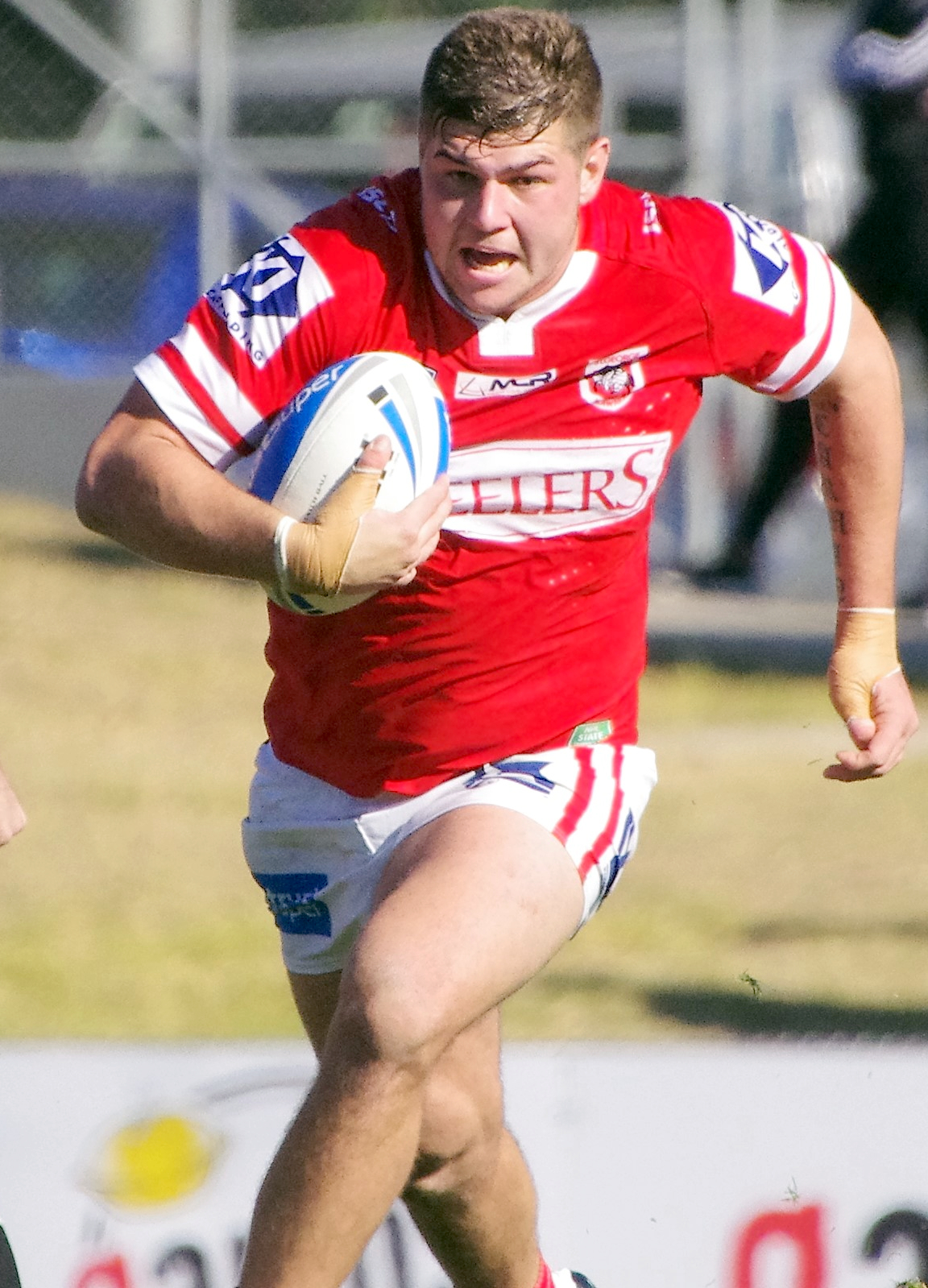

Personal information
- Born: 10 January 1997 (age 29) Wollongong, New South Wales, Australia
- Height: 185 cm (6 ft 1 in)
- Weight: 106 kg (16 st 10 lb)

Playing information
- Position: Prop, Lock
Club
Years	Team	Pld	T	G	FG	P
2017–26	St. George Illawarra	171	4	0	0	16
2027–	York Knights	0	0	0	0	0
	Total	171	4	0	0	16
- Source: As of 6 November 2026

Blake Lawrie (born 10 January 1997) is an Australian professional rugby league footballer who plays as a prop and lock for the York Knights in the Super League.

== Background ==
Lawrie was born in Wollongong, New South Wales, Australia.

He played his junior rugby league for the Dapto Canaries and Western Suburbs Red Devils, before being signed by the St. George Illawarra Dragons.

== Playing career ==
=== Early career ===
In 2015 and 2016, Lawrie played for the St. George Illawarra Dragons' NYC team.

=== 2017 ===
In 2017, Lawrie played for the Dragons' Intrust Super Premiership NSW team, Illawarra Cutters. On 1 May, he re-signed with the Dragons on a 2-year contract until the end of 2019. Later that week, he played for the Junior Kangaroos against the Junior Kiwis. On 31 May, he played for the New South Wales under-20s team against the Queensland under-20s team. In round 17 of the 2017 NRL season, he made his NRL debut for the Dragons against the Gold Coast Titans.

=== 2018 ===
Lawrie made a total of 9 appearances for St George Illawarra in the 2018 NRL season as the club qualified for the finals series. Lawrie played in both finals games for the club which were the upset victory in week one against Brisbane at Suncorp Stadium where St George Illawarra won the match 48-18 and the following week where the club lost the elimination final against South Sydney 13–12 at ANZ Stadium.

=== 2019 ===
Lawrie made a total of 23 appearances for St. George Illawarra in the 2019 NRL season as the club endured one of their toughest seasons finishing in 15th position on the table.

=== 2020 ===
Lawrie played 15 games for St. George Illawarra in the 2020 NRL season as the club finished 12th.

=== 2021 ===
On 5 July 2021, Lawrie was fined $20,000 by the NRL and suspended for one game after breaching the game's COVID-19 biosecurity protocols when he attended a party along with 12 other St. George Illawarra players at Paul Vaughan's property.

On 17 August, it was announced that Lawrie would be ruled out indefinitely with a broken hand which he sustained in the club's loss against Penrith. Lawrie played a total of 21 matches for St. George Illawarra in the 2021 NRL season as the club finished 11th on the table and missed out on the finals.

=== 2022 ===
On 29 May, Lawrie scored his first NRL try after 91 NRL appearances in their round 12 34–24 win against Canterbury-Bankstown at Belmore Sports Ground. Lawrie played 24 games for the club throughout the year as they finished 10th on the table and missed the finals.

=== 2023 ===
Lawrie would play a total of 22 games for St. George Illawarra in the 2023 NRL season as they finished 16th on the table.

=== 2024 ===
Lawrie made 20 appearances for St. George Illawarra in the 2024 NRL season as the club finished 11th on the table.

=== 2025 ===
Lawrie played 15 matches for St. George Illawarra in the 2025 NRL season. On 28 September, Lawrie played in St. George Illawarra's 30-12 NSW Cup Grand Final loss to New Zealand.

=== 2026 ===
On 30 August, St. George Illawarra announced that Lawrie would depart the club at the end of the season.

On 11 September 2026 it was reported that he had signed for York Knights in the Super League on a 2-year deal.

== Statistics ==
Season	Team	Pld	T	G	FG	P
2017	St. George Illawarra Dragons	6	-	-	-	0
2018	St. George Illawarra Dragons	9	-	-	-	0
2019	St. George Illawarra Dragons	23	-	-	-	0
2020	St. George Illawarra Dragons	20	-	-	-	0
2021	St. George Illawarra Dragons	21	-	-	-	0
2022	St. George Illawarra Dragons	24	1	-	-	4
2023	St. George Illawarra Dragons	22	2	-	-	8
2024	St. George Illawarra Dragons	20	-	-	-	0
2025	St. George Illawarra Dragons	15	-	-	-	0
2026*	St. George Illawarra Dragons	11	-	-	-	0
2027*	York Knights	0	-	-	-	0
	Totals	171	4	0	0	16

*denotes season competing
