= Tyrell Fuimaono =

Australian rugby league footballer

Ty Fuimaono
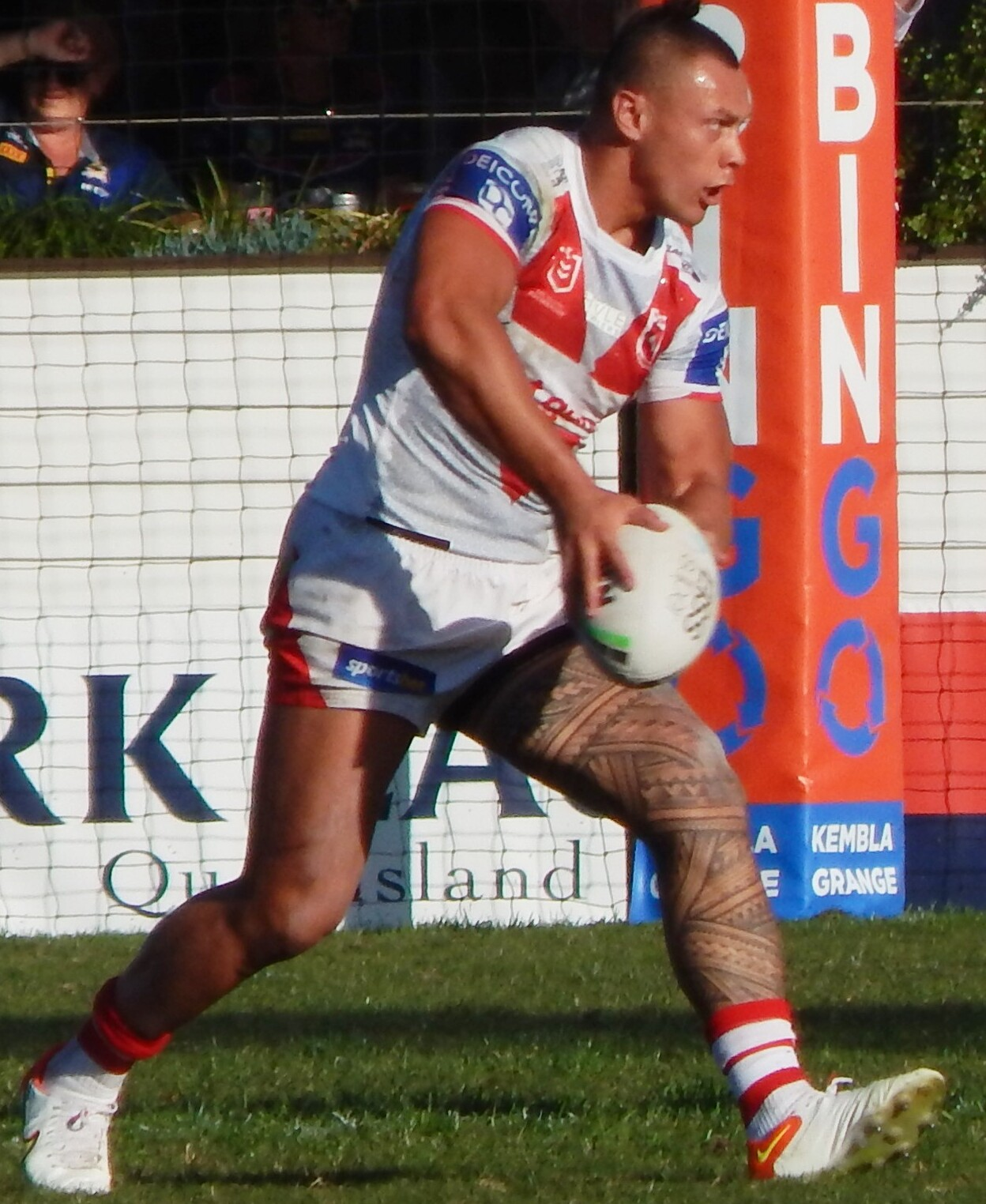

Personal information
- Full name: Tyrell Fuimaono
- Born: 6 March 1996 (age 30) Penrith, New South Wales, Australia
- Height: 186 cm (6 ft 1 in)
- Weight: 99 kg (15 st 8 lb)

Playing information
- Position: Second-row, Lock, Centre
Club
Years	Team	Pld	T	G	FG	P
2017–18	South Sydney	19	2	0	0	8
2019	Penrith Panthers	7	0	0	0	0
2020–22	St George Illawarra	40	2	0	0	8
	Total	66	4	0	0	16
Representative
Years	Team	Pld	T	G	FG	P
2020–23	Indigenous All Stars	4	0	0	0	0
- Source: As of 30 May 2022

Tyrell Fuimaono (born 6 March 1996) is an Australian professional rugby league footballer who last played as a second-row and lock forward for the St. George Illawarra Dragons in the National Rugby League (NRL).

He previously played for the South Sydney Rabbitohs and the Penrith Panthers in the NRL, and at representative level for the Indigenous All Stars.

== Early life ==
Fuimaono was born in Penrith, New South Wales, Australia. He is of Indigenous Australian (Wiradjuri) and Samoan descent.

He played his junior rugby league for St Marys Saints, and was selected to represent the Australian Schoolboys while attending Patrician Brothers' College, Blacktown in 2014.

== Playing career ==
=== 2016 ===
Fuimaono was signed by the Parramatta Eels, playing for their S. G. Ball Cup and National Youth Competition teams. He was named on the interchange bench in the 2016 NYC team of the year.

=== 2017 ===
Fuimaono joined South Sydney in 2017.

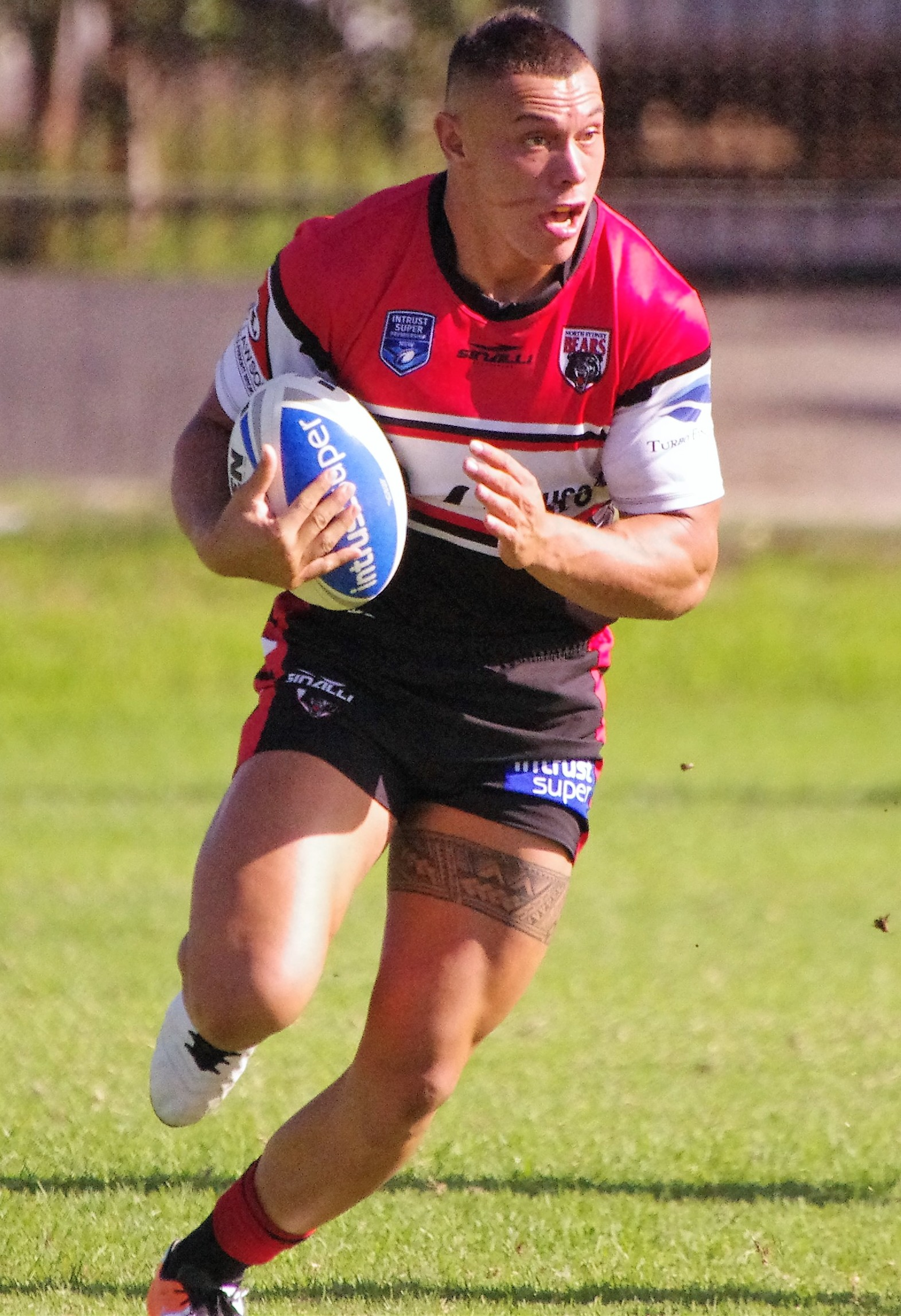
Fuimaono playing for the North Sydney Bears in 2017

Before making his NRL Debut, Fuimaono played the first half of the 2017 season in the NSW Cup with the North Sydney Bears and made a total of 8 appearances. Fuimaono made his NRL debut for Souths in their match against the Wests Tigers on 12 May. Fuimaono finished the season playing 15 games without missing a match since his debut, scoring 2 tries.

=== 2018 ===
Fuimaono only made 5 appearances for Souths as the player struggled with injuries and did not feature in Souths finals campaign.

=== 2019 ===
In 2019, Fuimaono signed a contract to join the Penrith Panthers after being released by South Sydney at the end of 2018. Fuimaono made his debut for Penrith against Parramatta in round 1 of the 2019 NRL season which ended in a 20–12 loss. On 16 September 2019, Fuimaono was one of ten players named who were being released by the Penrith club at the end of the 2019 NRL season.

=== 2020 ===
On 7 January 2020, Fuimaono signed a two-year deal for St. George Illawarra which be applicable for the 2020 and 2021 seasons.

In round 11 of the 2020 NRL season, he scored his first try for St. George Illawarra in a 28–24 loss to rivals Cronulla-Sutherland at Kogarah Oval.

Fuimaono played 17 games for St. George Illawarra in the 2020 NRL season as the club finished 13th on the table and missed out on the finals.

=== 2021 ===
In round 10 of the 2021 NRL season, Fuimaono was sent off in the club's 44–18 loss against Melbourne after a high tackle on Melbourne's Ryan Papenhuyzen. On 17 May 2021, Fuimaono was suspended for five matches by the NRL judiciary for his tackle on Papenhuyzen.

He played a total of 17 matches for St. George Illawarra in the 2021 NRL season as the club finished 11th on the table and missed out on the finals.

=== 2022 ===
On 20 February during St. George Illawarra's first pre-season trial match, Fuimaono was placed on report and sent to the sin-bin for a hip-drop tackle on Parramatta's Haze Dunster which ruled the player out of the entire 2022 NRL season. Fuimaono was subsequently suspended for five matches with an early guilty plea to a grade 3 dangerous contact charge.

== Post NRL ==
After being released by the Dragons, Fuimaono signed to play with the Thirroul Butchers in the Illawarra Competition.

== Statistics ==
Season	Team	Games	Tries	Pts
2017	South Sydney Rabbitohs	15	2	8
2018	South Sydney Rabbitohs	4		
2019	Penrith Panthers	7		
2020	St George-Illawarra Dragons	17	1	4
2021	St George-Illawarra Dragons	17	1	4
2022	St George-Illawarra Dragons	5		
	Totals	66	4	16

== Controversy ==
On 11 June 2019, Fuimaono was handed a 12-month good behaviour bond at court after pleading guilty to hindering police. The sentence was handed down in relation to an incident which happened in 2018 when Fuimaono tried to prevent police from arresting his cousin following a brawl on Oxford Street in Sydney's CBD.

On 5 July 2021, he was fined $12,000 by the NRL and suspended for one game after breaching the game's COVID-19 biosecurity protocols when he attended a party along with 12 other St. George Illawarra players at Paul Vaughan's property.
