= Cody Ramsey =

Australian rugby league footballer

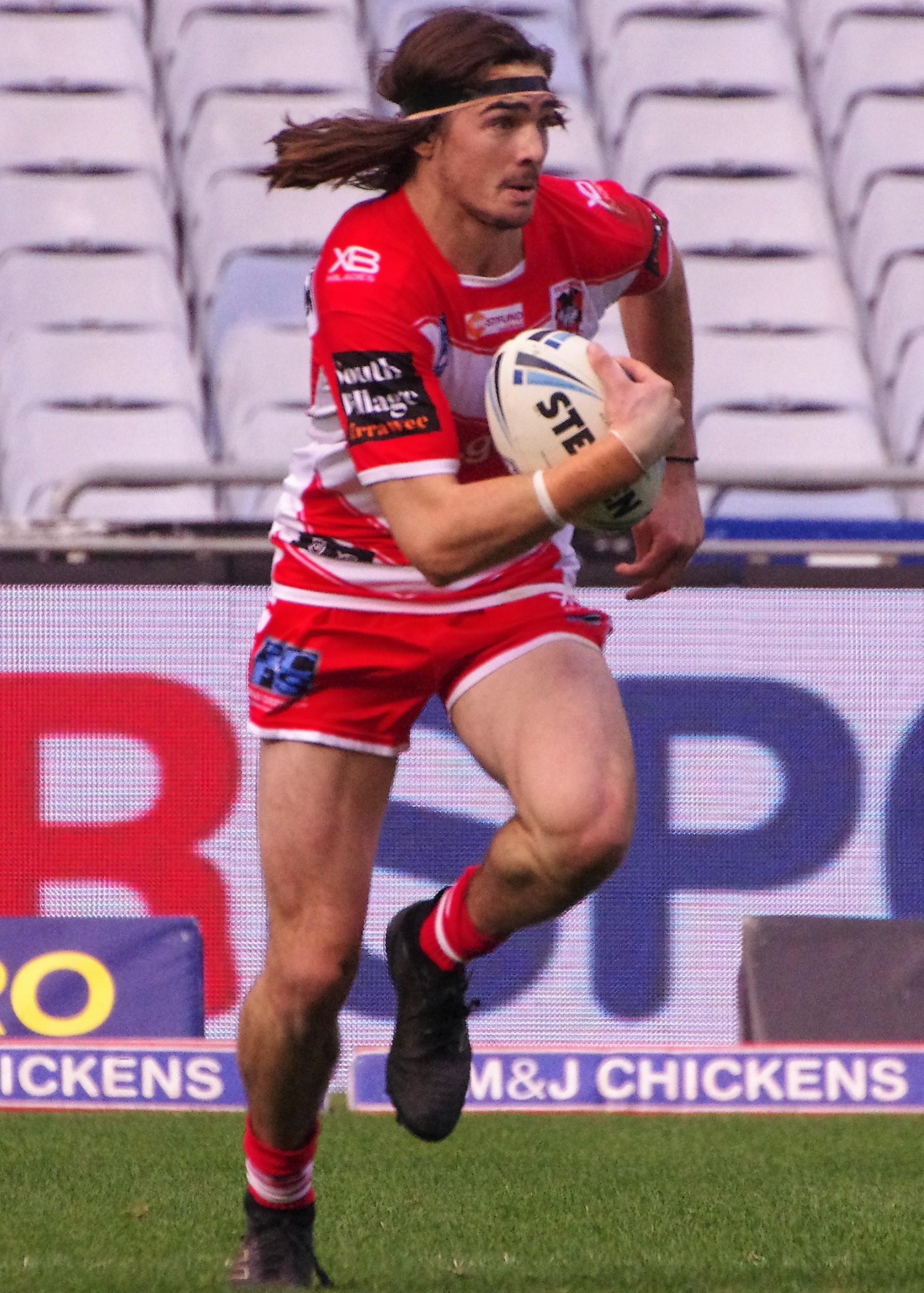

Personal information
- Born: 15 February 2000 (age 26) Molong, New South Wales, Australia
- Height: 185 cm (6 ft 1 in)
- Weight: 82 kg (12 st 13 lb)

Playing information
- Position: Wing, Fullback
Club
Years	Team	Pld	T	G	FG	P
2020–2022	St. George Illawarra	36	14	0	0	56
2026–	Sydney Roosters	12	2	2	0	12
	Total	48	16	2	0	68
- Source: As of 4 September 2026

Cody Ramsey (born 15 February 2000) is a professional rugby league footballer who plays as a winger or fullback for the Sydney Roosters in the National Rugby League (NRL).

Ramsey is of Indigenous Australian descent.

== Career ==
=== Early life ===
Ramsey played his junior rugby league at Cabonne United.

=== 2020 ===
Ramsey first appeared at the 2020 NRL Nines, where St. George Illawarra finished as runners-up. He finished the tournament as tied top try scorer with four tries as well as an appearance in the team of the tournament.

Ramsey scored two first-half tries, one on his first touch, in his first grade debut in round 18 of the 2020 NRL season for St. George Illawarra as they lost 8–37 against Canberra.

=== 2021 ===
In the opening minute of the Round 21 match for St. George Illawarra against the Canberra Raiders, Ramsey had his two front teeth snapped after a head clash with teammate Andrew McCullough, forcing him to leave the field.

Ramsey played a total of 18 matches for St. George Illawarra in the 2021 NRL season as the club finished 11th on the table and missed out on the finals.

=== 2022 ===
In round 24, Ramsey was sent to the sin bin during the clubs 24-22 victory over the Wests Tigers. Ramsey played a total of 15 games for the club and scored six tries as they finished 10th on the table and missed the finals.

=== 2023 - 2024 ===
Ramsey was ruled out of the entire 2023 season due to his ulcerative colitis illness which see him out for at least twelve months.

Ramsey would also not play in the 2024 season following his recovery from ulcerative colitis. In May 2024, Ramsey had returned to training. The Dragons would be granted salary cap relief due to Ramsey falling out of the Top 30 squad.

=== 2025 ===
On 16 February, Ramsey made a return from his Ulcerative colitis after 896 days away from the game. He played in St. George Illawarra's trial match against the Sydney Roosters. On 28 September, Ramsey played in St. George Illawarra's 30-12 NSW Cup Grand Final loss to New Zealand. On 13 October St. George Illawarra released a statement regarding Ramseys future and declared that he has decided to 'pursue an opportunity at another club.' The news was broken shortly after that he would be taking his services to the Sydney Roosters signing a two-year deal to the end of the 2027 season.

=== 2026 ===
On 2 May, In Round 9 of the 2026 NRL season, Ramsey came off the bench to play his first game in over 1,300 days in the Sydney Roosters win against the Broncos.

On 4 October, Ramsey won his first NRL premiership as the Sydney Roosters defeated the Newcastle Knights 19-18 in the 2026 NRL Grand Final. Ramsey did not play in the final, being on the bench for the 80 minutes, but played an integral part in the Sydney Roosters securing a Top 4 spot during the regular season. The Sydney Roosters finished 4th on the table in 2026 which proved valuable as they lost in week one of the finals against Penrith, but received a second chance in week two of the finals.

== Statistics ==
- † denotes premiership GF win

Season	Team	Games	Tries	Goals	FG	Pts
2020	St. George Illawarra Dragons	3	2	-	-	8
2021	St. George Illawarra Dragons	18	6	-	-	24
2022	St. George Illawarra Dragons	15	6	-	-	24
2026 †	Sydney Roosters	12	2	2		12
2027	Sydney Roosters					
	Totals	48	16	2	0	68
