= Billy Burns (rugby league) =

Australian rugby league footballer (born 1998)

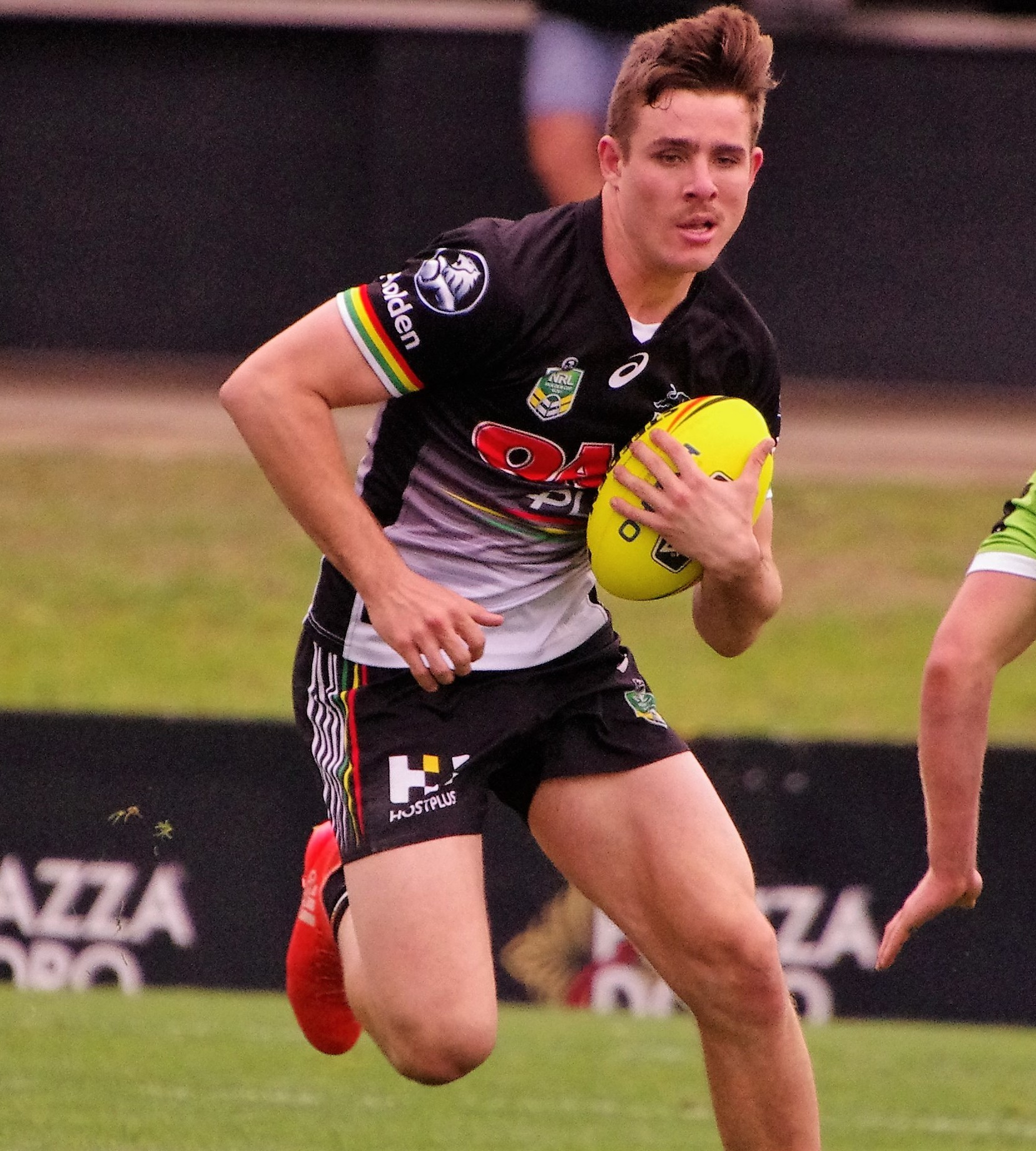

Personal information
- Full name: William Burns
- Born: 20 November 1998 (age 27) Parkes, New South Wales, Australia
- Height: 191 cm (6 ft 3 in)
- Weight: 104 kg (16 st 5 lb)

Playing information
- Position: Second-row
Club
Years	Team	Pld	T	G	FG	P
2019–20	Penrith Panthers	12	4	0	0	16
2021–23	St. George Illawarra	29	5	0	0	20
2024–	Cronulla Sharks	47	10	0	0	40
	Total	88	19	0	0	76
- Source: As of 19 September 2026

William Burns (born 20 November 1998) is an Australian professional rugby league footballer who plays as a second-row forward for the Cronulla-Sutherland Sharks in the National Rugby League (NRL).

He previously played for the Penrith Panthers and the St. George Illawarra Dragons in the NRL.

== Background ==
Burns was born in Parkes, New South Wales, Australia. He played his junior rugby league for Parkes Spacemen. Burns was educated at Red Bend Catholic College, Forbes and at McCarthy Catholic College, Emu Plains and represented the 2016 Australian Schoolboys. He then signed with Penrith Panthers.

== Playing career ==
Burns made his NRL debut for Penrith against the Sydney Roosters in round 24 of the 2019 NRL season at the Sydney Cricket Ground.

In round 25 of the 2019 NRL season against Newcastle, Burns scored two tries as Penrith won the match 54–10 at Penrith Park. Penrith ended the season finishing a disappointing 10th place and missed out on the finals.

On 7 April 2021, it was announced that Burns had signed with St. George Illawarra in a player swap with Eddie Blacker who had signed with Penrith.

Burns played a total of 15 matches for St. George Illawarra in the 2021 NRL season as the club finished 11th on the table and missed out on the finals. Burns was limited to only four appearances in the 2022 NRL season as St. George Illawarra missed the finals. Burns would play a total of ten games for the club in the 2023 NRL season as they finished 16th on the table. On 30 November 2023, Burns signed a contract to join arch-rivals Cronulla ahead of the 2024 NRL season. Burns was limited to only four appearances with Cronulla in the 2024 NRL season as they finished 4th on the table. On 29 September 2024, Burns played for and captained Newtown in their 2024 NSW Cup Grand Final victory over North Sydney.

=== 2025 ===
On 8 August, the Cronulla outfit announced that Burns had signed an extension with the club for a further 12 months. Burns played 17 matches for Cronulla in the 2025 NRL season as the club finished 5th on the table. The club reached the preliminary final for a second consecutive season but lost against Melbourne 22-14.

=== 2026 ===
On 19 March 2026, Cronulla announced that Burns had re-signed with the club for a further two years. Burns played 26 games for Cronulla in the 2026 NRL season as the club finished 5th on the table and qualified for the finals. Burns played in both finals matches for Cronulla as they were bundled out in the second week by eventual premiers the Sydney Roosters.

== Statistics ==
Season	Team	Pld	T	G	FG	P
2019	Penrith Panthers	2	2	0	0	8
2020	Penrith Panthers	10	2	0	0	8
2021	St. George Illawarra Dragons	15	2	0	0	8
2022	St. George Illawarra Dragons	4	0	0	0	0
2023	St. George Illawarra Dragons	10	3	0	0	12
2024	Cronulla-Sutherland Sharks	4	0	0	0	0
2025	Cronulla-Sutherland Sharks	17	4			16
2026	Cronulla-Sutherland Sharks	16	4			16
	Totals	78	17	0	0	68

*denotes season still competing
