= 2025 St. George Illawarra Dragons season =

- NRL Rank: 15th
- Play-off result: DNQ
- 2025 record: Wins: 8; losses: 16
- Points scored: For: 498; against: 628

Team information
- CEO: Tim Watsford
- Coach: Shane Flanagan
- Captain: Damien Cook & Clinton Gutherson
- Stadium: WIN Stadium (Capacity: 23,750); Jubilee Stadium (Capacity: 20,500)
- Avg. attendance: 12,505
- High attendance: 18,191 (Round 17 – Parramatta)

Top scorers
- Tries: Tyrell Sloan (17)
- Points: Valentine Holmes (114)
← 2024	List of seasons	2026 →

The 2025 St. George Illawarra Dragons season was the 27th season in the club's history. They competed in the National Rugby League.

New signings Damien Cook and Clinton Gutherson were co-captains, whilst head coach Shane Flanagan had his second season in the position.

== Squad information ==
St. George Illawarra Dragons 2025 squad
Top 30 squad - 2025 NRL season			Supplementary list	Coaching staff
Corey Allan – WG; Damien Cook (c) – HK; Ryan Couchman – SR; Toby Couchman – PR; Jack de Belin – LK; Dylan Egan – SR; Raymond Faitala-Mariner – SR; Mat Feagai – WG; Viliami Fifita – PR; Sione Finau – WG	Kyle Flanagan – FE; Emre Guler – PR; Clinton Gutherson (c) – FB; Valentine Holmes – CE; Lachlan Ilias – HB; David Klemmer – PR; Blake Lawrie – PR; Luciano Leilua – SR; Jacob Liddle – HK; Michael Molo – PR	Loko Pasifiki Tonga – PR; Cody Ramsey – FB; Hame Sele – PR; Tyrell Sloan – WG; Hamish Stewart – LK; Jaydn Su'A – SR; Moses Suli – CE; Nick Tsougranis – SR; Christian Tuipulotu – WG	Corey Ackers – PR; Jonah Glover – HB; Jacob Halangahu – SR; Lyhkan King-Togia – HB; Nathan Lawson – WG, CE; Ben Murdoch-Masila – PR	Manager: Ben Haran (General Manager of Football); Head coach: Shane Flanagan; Assistant coaches: Ryan Carr; Dean Young; Managers: Shane Millard (Recruitment & Pathways); Legend: (c) Captain(s); (vc) Vice-captain(s); Updated: 15 March 2026; Source(s): Dragons team profiles

== Squad changes ==
=== Transfers in ===
Player	2024 Club	2025 Club	Source
Emre Guler	Canberra Raiders	St. George Illawarra Dragons	
Valentine Holmes	North Queensland Cowboys	St. George Illawarra Dragons	
Clinton Gutherson	Parramatta Eels	St. George Illawarra Dragons	
Damien Cook	South Sydney Rabbitohs	St. George Illawarra Dragons	
Lachlan Ilias	South Sydney Rabbitohs	St. George Illawarra Dragons	
Nathan Lawson	Australia (Rugby sevens)	St. George Illawarra Dragons	

=== Transfers out ===
Player	2024 Club	2025 Club	Source
Ben Hunt	St. George Illawarra Dragons	Brisbane Broncos	
Max Feagai	St. George Illawarra Dragons	Dolphins	
Zac Lomax	St. George Illawarra Dragons	Parramatta Eels	
Mikaele Ravalawa	St. George Illawarra Dragons	South Sydney Rabbitohs (loan)	
Fa'amanu Brown	St. George Illawarra Dragons	Unattached	
Jack Bird	St. George Illawarra Dragons	Wests Tigers	

== Ladder ==
Pos	Team	Pld	W	D	L	B	PF	PA	PD	Pts	Qualification
1	Canberra Raiders	24	19	0	5	3	654	506	+148	44	Advance to finals series
2	Melbourne Storm	24	17	0	7	3	671	459	+212	40	Advance to finals series
3	Canterbury-Bankstown Bulldogs	24	16	0	8	3	534	414	+120	38	Advance to finals series
4	Brisbane Broncos (P)	24	15	0	9	3	680	508	+172	36	Advance to finals series
5	Cronulla-Sutherland Sharks	24	15	0	9	3	599	490	+109	36	Advance to finals series
6	New Zealand Warriors	24	14	0	10	3	517	496	+21	34	Advance to finals series
7	Penrith Panthers	24	13	1	10	3	576	469	+107	33	Advance to finals series
8	Sydney Roosters	24	13	0	11	3	653	521	+132	32	Advance to finals series
9	Dolphins	24	12	0	12	3	721	596	+125	30	
10	Manly Warringah Sea Eagles	24	12	0	12	3	555	534	+21	30	
11	Parramatta Eels	24	10	0	14	3	502	578	−76	26	
12	North Queensland Cowboys	24	9	1	14	3	538	684	−146	25	
13	Wests Tigers	24	9	0	15	3	477	612	−135	24	
14	South Sydney Rabbitohs	24	9	0	15	3	427	608	−181	24	
15	St. George Illawarra Dragons	24	8	0	16	3	498	628	−130	22	
16	Gold Coast Titans	24	6	0	18	3	520	719	−199	18	
17	Newcastle Knights	24	6	0	18	3	338	638	−300	18	

Source: National Rugby League
(P) Premiers

== Season results ==
=== Pre-Season Challenge ===
Date	Round	Opponent	Venue	Score	Tries	Goals	Attendance
Sunday, 16 February	Trial 1	Sydney Roosters	Jubilee Stadium	26 – 8	Kyle Flanagan 18'; Damien Cook 23'; Sione Finau 27'; Kade Reed 62'; Mikaele Ravalawa 76'	Valentine Holmes (3/5)	7,281
Saturday, 22 February	Trial 2 (Charity Shield)	South Sydney Rabbitohs	Glen Willow Regional Sports Stadium	46 – 26	Sione Finau 5', 18', 21', 28'; Mathew Feagai 11'; Lachlan Ilias 14'; Moses Suli 60'; Ryan Couchman 67'	Valentine Holmes (7/8)	8,417

=== NRL season ===
Date	Round	Opponent	Venue	Score	Tries	Goals	Attendance
Saturday, 8 March	1	Canterbury-Bankstown Bulldogs	Jubilee Stadium	20 – 28	Christian Tuipulotu 16', 55', 72'; Jacob Liddle 67'	Valentine Holmes (2/4)	16,211
Sunday, 15 March	2	South Sydney Rabbitohs	WIN Stadium	24 – 25	Tyrell Sloan 11',23'; Kyle Flanagan 31', 45'; Christian Tuipulotu 51'	Valentine Holmes (2/5)	16,111
	3	BYE					
Saturday, 29 March	4	Melbourne Storm	Jubilee Stadium	14 – 8	Valentine Holmes 32'; Jacob Liddle 67'	Valentine Holmes (2/2); PG: Valentine Holmes (1/2)	6,211
Saturday, 5 April	5	Parramatta Eels	CommBank Stadium	23 – 22	Clinton Gutherson 16', 45'; Christian Tuipulotu 34'	Valentine Holmes (3/3); PG: Valentine Holmes (2/2)	19,302
Friday, 11 April	6	Gold Coast Titans	WIN Stadium	38 – 16	Christian Tuipulotu 9', 42'; Valentine Holmes 31'; Tyrell Sloan 35', 59'; Kyle Flanagan 37'; Dylan Egan 72'	Valentine Holmes (5/7)	8,510
Thursday, 17 April	7	Manly Warringah Sea Eagles	4 Pines Park	18 – 20	Tyrell Sloan 18', 46'; Jacob Liddle 61'	Valentine Holmes (3/3); PG: Valentine Holmes (1/1)	17,254
Friday, 25 April	8 (Anzac Day Cup)	Sydney Roosters	Allianz Stadium	46 – 18	Sione Finau 7'; Kyle Flanagan 52'; Tyrell Sloan 73'	Valentine Holmes (3/3)	41,021
Saturday, 3 May	9 (Magic Round)	Wests Tigers	Suncorp Stadium	34 – 28	Dylan Egan 5'; Valentine Holmes 15'; Jacob Liddle 52', 55'; Hamish Stewart 77'	Valentine Holmes (4/5)	50,638
Saturday, 10 May	10	New Zealand Warriors	WIN Stadium	14 – 15	Clinton Gutherson 38'; Dylan Egan 48'; Corey Allan 51'	Valentine Holmes (1/3)	12,919
Sunday, 18 May	11	Brisbane Broncos	Suncorp Stadium	26 – 30	Tyrell Sloan 32', 66'; Clinton Gutherson 52', 74'; Jacob Liddle 57'	Valentine Holmes (4/5)	38,016
	12	BYE					
Friday, 30 May	13	Newcastle Knights	Jubilee Stadium	20 – 6	Jaydn Su'A 20'; Clinton Gutherson 24'; Loko Pasifiki Tonga 36'	Valentine Holmes (3/3); PG: Valentine Holmes (1/1)	10,411
Friday, 6 June	14	Dolphins	Suncorp Stadium	56 – 6	Valentine Holmes 63'	Valentine Holmes (0/1); PG: Valentine Holmes (1/1)	19,513
Thursday, 12 June	15	Cronulla-Sutherland Sharks	Sharks Stadium	30 – 18	Damien Cook 15'; Lyhkan King-Togia 25'; Jack De Belin 32'	Kyle Flanagan (3/3)	8,573
	16	BYE					
Saturday, 28 June	17	Parramatta Eels	WIN Stadium	34 – 20	Nathan Lawson 1',13'; Corey Allan 26'; Kyle Flanagan 29'; Valentine Holmes 33', 75'	Valentine Holmes (3/5); Kyle Flanagan (1/1); PG: Kyle Flanagan (1/1)	18,191
Saturday, 5 July	18	Canberra Raiders	GIO Stadium	28 – 24	Tyrell Sloan 32', 65'; Jaydn Su'A 57'; Kyle Flanagan 72'	Kyle Flanagan (3/4); PG: Kyle Flanagan (1/1)	15,932
Saturday, 12 July	19	Sydney Roosters	Jubilee Stadium	24 – 31	Tyrell Sloan 7'; Sione Finau 13', 16'; Jaydn Su'A 64'	Valentine Holmes (3/3); Kyle Flanagan (1/1)	13,856
Saturday, 19 July	20	Canterbury-Bankstown Bulldogs	Accor Stadium	20 – 18	Tyrell Sloan 16'; Moses Suli 50'; Sione Finau 54'	Kyle Flanagan (2/3); PG: Kyle Flanagan (1/1)	30,115
Friday, 25 July	21	North Queensland Cowboys	Queensland Country Bank Stadium	38 – 32	Tyrell Sloan 18'; Mathew Feagai 26'; Corey Allan 55'; Tyrell Sloan 58'; Jacob Liddle 64', 77'	Kyle Flanagan (4/6)	16,020
Saturday, 2 August	22	Canberra Raiders	WIN Stadium	18 – 12	Mathew Feagai 9'; Corey Allan 55'	Kyle Flanagan (2/2); PG: Kyle Flanagan (3/3)	8,567
Saturday, 9 August	23	Cronulla-Sutherland Sharks	Jubilee Stadium	22 – 14	Emre Guler 4'; Tyrell Sloan 20'; Hayden Buchanan 36'; Clinton Gutherson 46'	Kyle Flanagan (1/4); PG: Kyle Flanagan (2/2)	11,867
Friday, 15 August	24	New Zealand Warriors	Go Media Stadium	14 – 10	Mathew Feagai 10', 20'	Kyle Flanagan (1/2)	23,276
Thursday, 21 August	25	South Sydney Rabbitohs	Accor Stadium	40 – 0			7,213
Saturday, 30 August	26	Manly Warringah Sea Eagles	Jubilee Stadium	24 – 40	Lyhkan King-Togia 9'; Jacob Liddle 47'; Christian Tuipulotu 52'; Emre Guler 77'	Kyle Flanagan (4/4)	9,769
Saturday, 6 September	27	Penrith Panthers	WIN Stadium	20 – 40	Kyle Flanagan 19'; Corey Allan 47'; Tyrell Sloan 53'; Jaydn Su'A 75'	Kyle Flanagan (2/4)	17,442
