= 2024 St. George Illawarra Dragons season =

Australian rugby league club season

- NRL Rank: 11th
- Play-off result: DNQ
- 2024 record: Wins: 11; losses: 13
- Points scored: For: 508; against: 634

Team information
- CEO: Ryan Webb
- Coach: (Australia) Shane Flanagan
- Captain: (Australia) Ben Hunt
- Stadium: WIN Stadium (Capacity: 23,750); Netstrata Jubilee Stadium (Capacity: 20,500)
- Avg. attendance: 15,036
← 2023	List of seasons	2025 →

The 2024 St. George Illawarra Dragons season was the 26th season in the club's history and they competed in the National Rugby League.

The captain Ben Hunt retained his captaincy for his 4th consecutive season, while Head Coach Shane Flanagan had his first season in the position.

== Squad information ==
St. George Illawarra Dragons 2024 squad
Top 30 squad - 2024 NRL season			Supplementary list	Coaching staff
Jack Bird – CE, FB; Fa’amanu Brown – HB, HK, PR, LK; Ryan Couchman – SR; Toby Couchman – PR, LK; Jack de Belin – PR, LK; Tom Eisenhuth – LK, SR; Raymond Faitala-Mariner – SR, LK, PR; Mat Feagai – WG, FB, CE; Max Feagai – CE; Viliami Fifita – LK, PR	Sione Finau – WG; Kyle Flanagan – FE; Ben Hunt (c) – HB; Blake Lawrie – PR, LK; Luciano Leilua – SR; Jacob Liddle – HK; Zac Lomax – WG, CE; Jesse Marschke – HB, HK, FE, FB; Francis Molo – PR; Michael Molo – LK, PR	Ben Murdoch-Masila – LK, SR; Mikaele Ravalawa – WG; Dan Russell – SR, LK; Hame Sele – PR; Tyrell Sloan – FB; Jaydn Su'A – SR; Moses Suli – CE; Savelio Tamale – CE, WG, FB; Alec Tuitavake – PR; Christian Tuipulotu – WG, CE	Corey Ackers – PR; Josh Coric – PR; Dylan Egan – SR; Connor Muhleisen – HK; Jackson Shereb – SR; Hamish Stewart – LK, SR	Manager: Ben Haran (General Manager of Football); Head coach: Shane Flanagan; Assistant coaches: Ryan Carr; Ben Woolf; Dean Young; Managers: Shane Millard (Recruitment & Pathways); Legend: (c) Captain(s); (vc) Vice-captain(s); Updated: 7 September 2024; Source(s): Dragons team profiles

== Pre-season ==
St. George played the South Sydney Rabbitohs in Kogarah and the Wests Tigers in Mudgee as their pre-season fixtures. Both matches were part of the second edition of the NRL Pre-season Challenge.

Win Draw Loss

Round 1: 17 February 2024	South Sydney Rabbitohs	28–6	St. George Illawarra Dragons	Sydney
20:05 AEDT	Tries: Host 36'; Burns 48', 71'; Moale 62'; Kennar 80'; Goals: Hawkins 3/4 37', 50', 63'; Milne 1/1 80'	[Report; Details Report]	Tries: Ravalawa 38'; Goals: Lomax 1/1 40'	Stadium: Netstrata Jubilee Stadium; Attendance: 8,827; Referee: Belinda Sharpe

Round 2: 24 February 2024	St. George Illawarra Dragons	34–18	Wests Tigers	Mudgee
20:05 AEDT		[Report Report]		Stadium: Glen Willow Oval; Attendance: 4,962; Referee: Kasey Badger

== Regular season ==
=== League table ===
Pos	Team	Pld	W	D	L	B	PF	PA	PD	Pts	Qualification
1	Melbourne Storm	24	19	0	5	3	692	449	+243	44	Advance to finals series
2	Penrith Panthers (P)	24	17	0	7	3	580	394	+186	40	Advance to finals series
3	Sydney Roosters	24	16	0	8	3	738	463	+275	38	Advance to finals series
4	Cronulla-Sutherland Sharks	24	16	0	8	3	653	431	+222	38	Advance to finals series
5	North Queensland Cowboys	24	15	0	9	3	657	568	+89	36	Advance to finals series
6	Canterbury-Bankstown Bulldogs	24	14	0	10	3	529	433	+96	34	Advance to finals series
7	Manly Warringah Sea Eagles	24	13	1	10	3	634	521	+113	33	Advance to finals series
8	Newcastle Knights	24	12	0	12	3	470	510	−40	30	Advance to finals series
9	Canberra Raiders	24	12	0	12	3	474	601	−127	30	
10	Dolphins	24	11	0	13	3	577	578	−1	28	
11	St. George Illawarra Dragons	24	11	0	13	3	508	634	−126	28	
12	Brisbane Broncos	24	10	0	14	3	537	607	−70	26	
13	New Zealand Warriors	24	9	1	14	3	512	574	−62	25	
14	Gold Coast Titans	24	8	0	16	3	488	656	−168	22	
15	Parramatta Eels	24	7	0	17	3	561	716	−155	20	
16	South Sydney Rabbitohs	24	7	0	17	3	494	682	−188	20	
17	Wests Tigers	24	6	0	18	3	463	750	−287	18	

Source: National Rugby League
(P) Premiers

=== Results by round ===
Round	1	2	3	4	5	6	7	8	9	10	11	12	13	14	15	16	17	18	19	20	21	22	23	24	25	26	27
Ground	A	A	H	H	A	A	H	H	A	H	–	A	A	H	A	–	H	A	A	–	H	A	H	H	H	A	H
Result	W	L	L	W	L	W	W	L	L	W	B	L	W	W	L	B	W	L	W	B	L	W	L	W	L	L	L
Position	2	11	15	13	15	13	9	11	13	11	9	12	12	9	11	9	8	10	9	9	10	8	9	8	8	10	11
Points	2	2	2	4	4	6	8	8	8	10	12	12	14	16	16	18	20	20	22	24	24	26	26	28	28	28	28

Source: National Rugby League
A = Away; H = Home; N = Neutral; B = Bye; W = Win; D = Draw; L = Loss

=== Matches ===
The league fixtures were announced on 13 November 2023.

Win Draw Loss Fixtures

Round 1: 9 March 2024	Gold Coast Titans	4–28	St. George Illawarra Dragons	Gold Coast
18:35 AEST	Tries: Khan-Pereira 34'; Goals: Boyd 0/1	[Report Report]	Tries: Sloan 2', 54', 66'; Flanagan 47'; Lomax 62'; Goals: Lomax 4/5 3', 48', 55', 67'	Stadium: Cbus Super Stadium; Attendance: 14,537; Referee: Ziggy Przeklasa-Adamski

Round 2: 17 March 2024	Dolphins	38–0	St. George Illawarra Dragons	Redcliffe
17:15 AEST	Tries: Tabuai-Fidow 5', 59', 70'; Isaako 9'; Nicholls 47'; Averillo 57'; Marshall-King 68'; Goals: Isaako 5/7 7', 49', 59', 61', 70'	[Report Report]	Sin bin: F. Molo (yellow card) 76' to 80'	Stadium: Kayo Stadium; Attendance: 10,011; Referee: Grant Atkins

Round 3: 23 March 2024	St. George Illawarra Dragons	24–46	North Queensland Cowboys	Kogarah
17:30 AEDT	Tries: Lomax 10', 69'; Sloan 14'; Flanagan 19'; Goals: Lomax 4/4 12', 16', 20', 71'	[Report Report]	Tries: Taulagi 4'; McIntyre 24'; Neame 32'; Drinkwater 37'; Finefeuiaki 49'; Dearden 53'; Holmes 61'; Townsend 64'; Goals: Holmes 7/8 26', 33', 38', 50', 54', 62', 65'	Stadium: Netstrata Jubilee Stadium; Attendance: 9,252; Referee: Belinda Sharpe

Round 4: 30 March 2024	St. George Illawarra Dragons	20–12	Manly Warringah Sea Eagles	Wollongong
17:30 AEDT	Tries: Bird 7'; Sloan 33', 62'; Su'a 37'; Goals: Lomax 2/4 9', 63'	[Report Report]	Tries: Koula 3'; Olakau'atu 76'; Goals: Garrick 2/2 4', 77'	Stadium: WIN Stadium; Attendance: 16,215; Referee: Ashley Klein

Round 5: 5 April 2024	Newcastle Knights	30–10	St. George Illawarra Dragons	Newcastle
20:00 AEDT	Tries: Hastings 4'; Tuala 24'; D. Saifiti 29'; Lucas 34'; Ponga 73'; Goals: Ponga 5/5 5', 26', 30', 36', 74'	[Report Report]	Tries: Lomax 13'; Hunt 21'; Goals: Lomax 1/2 22'	Stadium: McDonald Jones Stadium; Attendance: 9,448; Referee: Belinda Sharpe

Round 6: 14 April 2024	Wests Tigers	12–24	St. George Illawarra Dragons	Campbelltown
16:05 AEST	Tries: Utoikamanu 14'; Kepaoa 70'; Goals: Koroisau 2/3 23 pen', 71'	[Report Report]	Tries: Lomax 1'; Bird 25'; Flanagan 36'; Su'a 62'; Goals: Lomax 4/5 27', 38', 59 pen', 63'	Stadium: Campbelltown Sports Stadium; Attendance: 17,141; Referee: Grant Atkins

Round 7: 19 April 2024	St. George Illawarra Dragons	30–12	New Zealand Warriors	Wollongong
18:00 AEST	Tries: Suli 24'; Ravalawa 29'; Hunt 35'; Lomax 40'; Sloan 61'; Goals: Lomax 4/6 36', 42', 53 pen', 63'; Field goals: Lomax 39 (2pt)'	[Report Report]	Tries: Johnson 11'; Watene-Zelezniak 69'; Goals: Johnson 2/2 12', 71'	Stadium: WIN Stadium; Attendance: 13,111; Referee: Gerard Sutton

Round 8: 25 April 2024	St. George Illawarra Dragons	18–60	Sydney Roosters	Moore Park
16:00 AEST	Tries: Su'a 5'; De Belin 50'; Eisenhuth 67'; Goals: Lomax 3/3 6', 51', 68'	[Report Report]	Tries: Young 10'; Crichton 16'; Manu 26', 59'; Walker 32'; N. Butcher 36', 71'; Keary 55'; Tedesco 62'; Sua'ali'i 76'; Goals: Walker 10/10 12', 17', 28', 33', 38', 57', 61', 63', 73', 77'	Stadium: Allianz Stadium; Attendance: 40,727; Referee: Adam Gee

Round 9: 5 May 2024	Cronulla-Sutherland Sharks	20–10	St. George Illawarra Dragons	Cronulla
16:05 AEST	Tries: Kaufusi 13'; Talakai 45'; Hazelton 64'; Goals: Hynes 4/4 15', 46', 66', 77 pen'	[Report Report]	Tries: Ravalawa 26', 39'; Goals: Lomax 1/2 39'	Stadium: PointsBet Stadium; Attendance: 9,731; Referee: Todd Smith

Round 10: 11 May 2024	St. George Illawarra Dragons	28–14	South Sydney Rabbitohs	Kogarah
17:30 AEST	Tries: Lomax 9'; Bird 26'; Su'a 58'; De Belin 72'; Goals: Lomax 5/6 11', 42 pen', 60', 64 pen', 74'; Field goals: Lomax 39 (2 pt)'	[Report Report]	Tries: L. Mitchell 22', 77'; Thompson 45'; Goals: L. Mitchell 1/3 23'	Stadium: Nestrata Jubilee Stadium; Attendance: 7,517; Referee: Belinda Sharpe

Round 11 (Bye for St. George Illawarra Dragons)

Round 12: 23 May 2024	Canterbury-Bankstown Bulldogs	44–12	St. George Illawarra Dragons	Sydney Olympic Park
19:50 AEST	Tries: Burton 8', 67'; Salmon 46', 52'; Kiraz 56', 78'; Preston 60'; Crichton 70'; Goals: Burton 6/9 20', 46', 53', 58', 63 pen', 71'	[Report Report]	Tries: Suli 12'; Liddle 31'; Goals: Lomax 2/2 14', 33'; Sin bin: Lomax (yellow card) 63' to 73'	Stadium: Accor Stadium; Attendance: 15,442; Referee: Adam Gee

Round 13: 1 June 2024	Penrith Panthers	10–22	St. George Illawarra Dragons	Penrith
17:30 AEST	Tries: Alamoti 25'; McLean 35'; Goals: Alamoti 1/2 36'	[Report Report]	Tries: T. Couchman 42'; Sloan 47'; Mat Feagai 68'; Faitala-Mariner 72'; Goals: Flanagan 3/4 44', 49', 74'	Stadium: BlueBet Stadium; Attendance: 12,025; Referee: Todd Smith

Round 14: 7 June 2024	St. George Illawarra Dragons	56–14	Wests Tigers	Wollongong
20:00 AEST	Tries: Flanagan 22'; Lomax 27', 75', 79'; Mat Feagai 45', 66'; Leilua 52', 60'; Hunt 57'; Goals: Lomax 10/10 24', 29', 47', 49 pen', 54', 58', 61', 68', 77', 79'	[Report Report]	Tries: Lobb 4'; Sullivan 12'; Seyfarth 39'; Goals: Koroisau 1/3 13'; Sin bin: Sullivan (yellow card) 49' to 59'	Stadium: WIN Stadium; Attendance: 9,969; Referee: Chris Butler

Round 15: 16 June 2024	Manly Warringah Sea Eagles	30–14	St. George Illawarra Dragons	Brookvale
14:00 AEST	Tries: Hopoate 4'; Olakau'atu 25'; Brooks 43'; B. Trbojevic 52'; J. Trbojevic 60'; Saab 70'; Goals: Garrick 0/1; Cherry-Evans 3/6 43', 62', 71'	[Report Report]	Tries: Liddle 11'; Flanagan 14'; Lomax 46'; Goals: Lomax 1/3 15'	Stadium: 4 Pines Park; Attendance: 17,187; Referee: Peter Gough

Round 16 (Bye for St. George Illawarra Dragons)

Round 17: 30 June 2024	St. George Illawarra Dragons	26–6	Dolphins	Kogarah
14:00 AEST	Tries: Faitala-Mariner 46'; Tuipulotu 53'; Sloan 57'; De Belin 64'; Liddle 68'; Goals: Flanagan 3/6 34 pen', 59', 70'	[Report Report]	Tries: Niu 38'; Goals: Isaako 1/1 40'; Sin bin: Donoghoe (yellow card) 66' to 76'	Stadium: Nestrata Jubilee Stadium; Attendance: 8,052; Referee: Adam Gee

Round 18: 7 July 2024	Sydney Roosters	42–12	St. George Illawarra Dragons	Moore Park
14:00 AEST	Tries: Radley 6'; Young 25'; Collins 51'; Crichton 56'; Tedesco 61'; Tupou 65'; Tupouniua 78'; Goals: Walker 7/8 7', 9 pen', 27', 53', 63', 67', 79'; Sin bin: Waerea-Hargreaves (yellow card) 16' to 26'	[Report Report]	Tries: Liddle 36'; Tuipulotu 47'; Goals: Lomax 2/2 37', 49'	Stadium: Allianz Stadium; Attendance: 23,388; Referee: Ashley Klein

Round 19: 13 July 2024	Brisbane Broncos	26–30	St. George Illawarra Dragons	Brisbane
19:35 AEST	Tries: Walters 11'; Mam 54'; Staggs 63', 77'; Mozer 72'; Goals: Staggs 3/5 13', 55', 73'; Sin bin: Staggs (yellow card) 15' to 25'	[Report Report]	Tries: Tuipulotu 6', 30', 43'; Suli 24'; Su'a 33'; Goals: Flanagan 5/7 16 pen', 32', 35', 44', 70 pen'	Stadium: Suncorp Stadium; Attendance: 34,224; Referee: Liam Kennedy

Round 20 (Bye for St. George Illawarra Dragons)

Round 21: 28 July 2024	St. George Illawarra Dragons	10–46	Penrith Panthers	Wollongong
14:00 AEST	Tries: Tuipulotu 32'; Su'a 79'; Goals: Lomax 1/2 79'	[Report Report]	Tries: C. McLean 3'; Martin 12'; Cleary 18', 24', 71'; Sorensen 44'; Smith 69'; Toelau 76'; Goals: Cleary 7/8 4', 13', 26', 46', 70', 73', 77'	Stadium: WIN Stadium; Attendance: 18,988; Referee: Gerard Sutton

Round 22: 3 August 2024	Melbourne Storm	16–18	St. George Illawarra Dragons	Melbourne
17:30 AEST	Tries: Grant 14', 59'; Anderson 34'; Goals: Meaney 2/3 15', 60'	[Report Report]	Tries: Su'a 24', 49'; Sloan 28'; Goals: Lomax 3/3 25', 30', 50'	Stadium: AAMI Park; Attendance: 18,103; Referee: Grant Atkins

Round 23: 10 August 2024	St. George Illawarra Dragons	10–28	Canterbury-Bankstown Bulldogs	Kogarah
19:35 AEST	Tries: Lomax 22'; Sloan 36'; Goals: Lomax 1/2 23'	[Report Report]	Tries: Burton 3'; Xerri 25', 29'; Mann 58'; Goals: Burton 6/6 4', 13 pen', 27', 30', 59', 74 pen'	Stadium: Nestrata Jubilee Stadium; Attendance: 18,416; Referee: Gerard Sutton

Round 24: 18 August 2024	St. George Illawarra Dragons	32–16	Gold Coast Titans	Wollongong
14:00 AEST	Tries: Tuipulotu 7'; Hunt 10'; Lomax 27'; T. Couchman 32'; Leilua 38'; F. Molo 76'; Goals: Lomax 4/6 11', 34', 39', 77'; Sin bin: De Belin (yellow card) 51' to 61'	[Report Report]	Tries: S. Fifita 1', 64'; Campbell 45'; Goals: Campbell 2/3 2', 47'	Stadium: WIN Stadium; Attendance: 9,240; Referee: Wyatt Raymond

Round 25: 25 August 2024	St. George Illawarra Dragons	10–38	Cronulla-Sutherland Sharks	Wollongong
16:05 AEST	Tries: Bird 22'; Tuipulotu 54'; Goals: Lomax 1/2 24'	[Report Report]	Tries: Ramien 6'; Iro 27'; Stonestreet 33', 67'; Kennedy 57'; Nikora 61'; Hiroti 77'; Goals: Trindall 5/7 28', 58', 62', 68', 78'; Sin bin: Ramien (yellow card) 16' to 26'	Stadium: WIN Stadium; Attendance: 17,754; Referee: Ashley Klein

Round 26: 31 August 2024	Parramatta Eels	44–40	St. George Illawarra Dragons	Parramatta
15:00 AEST	Tries: Penisini 3'; Sivo 8', 55', 63'; Gutherson 22', 43'; Tago 30'; Lane 36'; Brown 40'; Goals: Asi 4/9 10', 24', 38', 44'	[Report Report]	Tries: Muhleisen 14'; Lomax 50'; Mat Feagai 70', 77', 80'; Sloan 72', 76'; Goals: Lomax 6/7 15', 51', 71', 73', 77', 78'	Stadium: CommBank Stadium; Attendance: 21,623; Referee: Wyatt Raymond

Round 27: 7 September 2024	St. George Illawarra Dragons	24–26	Canberra Raiders	Kogarah
15:00 AEST	Tries: Eisenhuth 0'; Liddle 8'; Su'a 11'; King-Togia 19'; Goals: Lomax 4/4 2', 10', 12', 20'	[Report Report]	Tries: Levi 14'; Savage 24'; Hopoate 47'; Young 61'; Horsburgh 77'; Goals: Weekes 3/5 16', 48', 78'	Stadium: Netstrata Jubilee Stadium; Attendance: 11,189; Referee: Wyatt Raymond
