= List of St. George Illawarra Dragons seasons =

The St. George Illawarra Dragons are a rugby league club jointly based in Kogarah and Wollongong, New South Wales who compete in the National Rugby League. The club was formed on 23 September 1998 by a merger of the St. George Dragons and the Illawarra Steelers and they played their first competitive match in 1999 against the Parramatta Eels, losing 20–10. The club shares home games between Jubilee Oval and Wollongong Showground.

The club have competed in 25 seasons over their history, winning four trophies. These include one premiership (2010), two minor premierships (2009, 2010) and one World Club Challenge (2011). These achievements are listed below in bold.

== Seasons ==
P=Games played; W=Games won; D=Games drawn; L=Games lost; PF=Points scored; PA=Points against; Pts=Points; F=Finals
Season	Competition	P(F)	W(F)	D(F)	L(F)	PF(F)	PA(F)	Ladder position	Finals result	World Club Challenge	NRL Nines	Coach	Captain	Name	Tries	Name	Points	Source
Season	Competition	P(F)	W(F)	D(F)	L(F)	PF(F)	PA(F)	Ladder position	Finals result	World Club Challenge	NRL Nines	Coach	Captain	Top Tryscorer		Top Pointscorer		Source
1999	NRL	24(4)	15(3)	0	9(1)	588(104)	416(56)	6/17	Runners Up			David Waite	Paul McGregor	Nathan Blacklock	24	Wayne Bartrim	162	
2000	NRL	26	12	0	14	576	656	9/14				David Waite → Andrew Farrar	Craig Smith	Nathan Blacklock	25	Nathan Blacklock	124	
2001	NRL	26(2)	12(1)	2	12(1)	661(51)	573(66)	7/14	Semi Final			Andrew Farrar	Craig Smith	Nathan Blacklock	27	Mark Riddell	122	
2002	NRL	24(2)	9(1)	3	12(1)	632(50)	546(62)	7/15	Semi Final			Andrew Farrar	Trent Barrett	Lee Hookey	18	Mark Riddell	129	
2003	NRL	24	11	0	13	548	593	10/15				Nathan Brown	Trent Barrett	Nathan Blacklock	14	Mark Riddell	166	
2004	NRL	24(1)	14	0	10(1)	624(30)	415(31)	5/15	Qualifying Final			Nathan Brown	Trent Barrett	Matt Cooper	17	Mathew Head	119	
2005	NRL	24(2)	16(1)	0	8(1)	655(40)	510(42)	2/15	Preliminary Final			Nathan Brown	Trent Barrett	Colin Best	20	Michael Ennis	108	
2006	NRL	24(3)	14(2)	0	10(1)	519(58)	481(28)	6/15	Preliminary Final			Nathan Brown	Trent Barrett	Mark Gasnier	18	Aaron Gorrell	130	
2007	NRL	24	9	0	15	431	509	13/16				Nathan Brown	Various	Matt Cooper	14	Jamie Soward	105	
2008	NRL	24(1)	13	0	11(1)	489(6)	378(38)	7/16	Qualifying Final			Nathan Brown	Mark Gasnier	Josh Morris	14	Jamie Soward	129	
2009	NRL	24(2)	17	0	7 (2)	548(22)	329(49)	**1/16**	Semi Final			Wayne Bennett	Ben Hornby	Brett Morris	25	Jamie Soward	234	
2010	NRL	24(3)	17(3)	0	7	518(73)	299(20)	**1/16**	**Premiers**			Wayne Bennett	Ben Hornby	Brett Morris	20	Jamie Soward	197	
2011	NRL	24(2)	14	1	9(2)	483(24)	341(34)	5/16	Semi Final	**Winners**		Wayne Bennett	Ben Hornby	Matt Cooper	14	Jamie Soward	157	
2012	NRL	24	11	0	13	405	438	9/16				Steve Price	Ben Hornby	Brett Morris	14	Jamie Soward	97	
2013	NRL	24	7	0	17	379	530	14/16				Steve Price	Ben Creagh	Brett Morris; Jason Nightingale; Daniel Vidot	9	Jamie Soward	58	
2014	NRL	24	11	0	13	469	528	11/16			Pool Stage	Steve Price → Paul McGregor	Ben Creagh	Jason Nightingale	16	Gareth Widdop	137	
2015	NRL	24(1)	12	0	12(1)	435(10)	408(11)	8/16	Elimination Final		Pool Stage	Paul McGregor	Ben Creagh	Gareth Widdop	9	Gareth Widdop	182	
2016	NRL	24	10	0	14	341	538	11/16			Pool Stage	Paul McGregor	Gareth Widdop	Kurt Mann	10	Gareth Widdop	133	
2017	NRL	24	12	0	12	533	450	9/16			Pool Stage	Paul McGregor	Gareth Widdop	Jason Nightingale	16	Gareth Widdop	191	
2018	NRL	24(2)	15(1)	0	9(1)	519(60)	472(31)	7/16	Semi Final			Paul McGregor	Gareth Widdop	Matthew Dufty	13	Gareth Widdop	205	
2019	NRL	24	8	0	16	427	575	15/16				Paul McGregor	Gareth Widdop	Mikaele Ravalawa	11	Gareth Widdop	64	
2020	NRL	20	7	0	13	378	452	12/16			Runners Up	Paul McGregor → Dean Young	Cameron McInnes	Matthew Dufty; Zac Lomax; Mikaele Ravalawa	13	Zac Lomax	178	
2021	NRL	24	8	0	16	474	616	11/16				Anthony Griffin	Ben Hunt	Mikaele Ravalawa	14	Zac Lomax	86	
2022	NRL	24	12	0	12	469	569	10/16				Anthony Griffin	Ben Hunt	Mat Feagai	10	Zac Lomax	167	
2023	NRL	24	5	0	19	474	673	16/17				Anthony Griffin → Ryan Carr	Ben Hunt	Mikaele Ravalawa	21	Zac Lomax	142	
2024	NRL	24	11	0	13	508	634	11/17				Shane Flanagan	Ben Hunt	Zac Lomax	14	Zac Lomax	202	
2025	NRL	24	8	0	16	498	628	15/17				Shane Flanagan	Clinton Gutherson	Tyrell Sloan	17	Valentine Holmes	114	
2026	NRL	24	5	0	21	392	717	17/17	wooden spooners			Shane Flanagan → Dean Young	Damien Cook; Clinton Gutherson	Tyrell Sloan	12	Valentine Holmes	148	
