= Mikaele Ravalawa =

Fiji international rugby league footballer (born 1997)

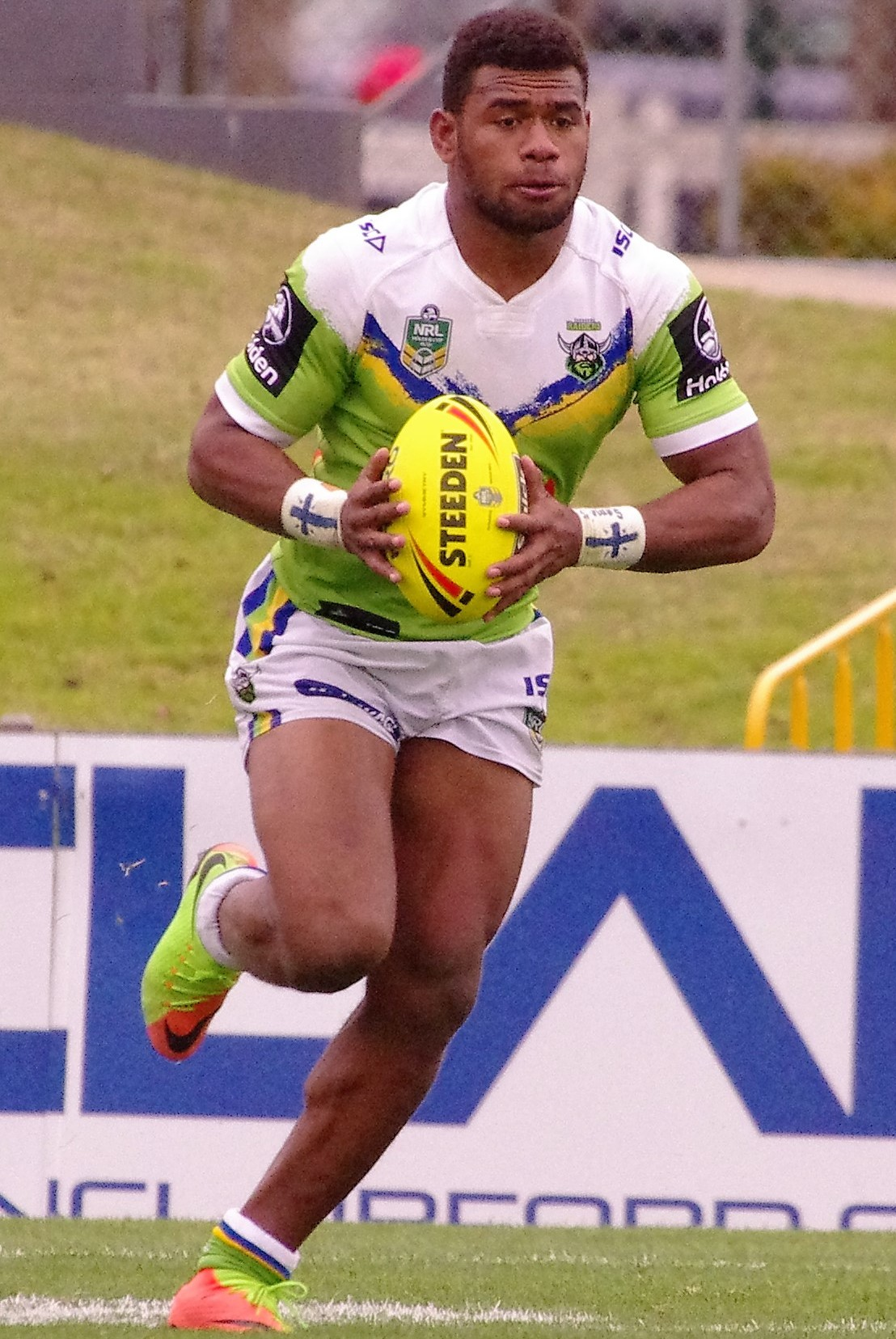

Personal information
- Full name: Mikaele Ravalawa
- Born: 9 November 1997 (age 29) Galoa Island, Fiji
- Height: 6 ft 0 in (1.84 m)
- Weight: 16 st 5 lb (104 kg)

Playing information
- Position: Wing
Club
Years	Team	Pld	T	G	FG	P
2019–25	St. George Illawarra	98	67	0	0	268
2025(loan)	→ South Sydney	3	0	0	0	0
2026	Castleford Tigers	15	5	0	0	20
2026(loan)	→ Doncaster	2	2	0	0	8
	Total	118	74	0	0	296
Representative
Years	Team	Pld	T	G	FG	P
2017–	Fiji	5	0	0	0	0
- Source: As of 3 September 2026

Mikaele Ravalawa (born 9 November 1997) is a Fijian professional rugby league footballer who most recently played as a winger for Castleford Tigers in the Super League and Fiji at international level.

He has previously played for the St. George Illawarra Dragons and South Sydney Rabbitohs in the National Rugby League. He has spent time on loan at Doncaster in the RFL Championship.

== Background ==
Ravalawa was born in Galoa Island, Fiji.

From Galoa Island, Ravalawa originally played rugby union and captained the Fijian Under-18's rugby sevens team.

== Playing career ==
=== 2017–2018 ===
He joined Burnside High School in Christchurch on a scholarship as part of their international rugby programme. He played for the schools first XV and the Crusaders' Under-18 team.

He then switched to rugby league after being spotted by Peter Mulholland, joining the Canberra Raiders in 2017 and played for their Holden Cup (Under-20s) team. That season, Ravalawa scored 12 tries in 22 games and won Canberra's under 20s player of the year award.

He was named in the Fiji squad for the 2017 Rugby League World Cup.

=== 2019 ===
Ravalawa joined the St. George Illawarra Dragons and made 19 appearances for the club during the 2019 NRL season and finished as the club's top try scorer with 14 and became a crowd favourite at Kogarah and WIN Stadium.

=== 2020 ===
In 2020, Ravalawa was awarded a penalty try in the club's first match of the season against the Wests Tigers. In that match, he injured his thigh, meaning he could not finish the match and play the next week. In June 2020, Ravalawa re-signed with the club on a three-year deal, keeping him at St. George Illawarra until at least the end of the 2023 season. He ended the season as the club's tied top try-scorer alongside Zac Lomax and Matthew Dufty, scoring 13 tries in the process.

=== 2021 ===
On 27 April, Ravalawa was suspended for two matches after he was initially placed on report for an illegal shoulder charge during the club's loss to the Sydney Roosters in round 7 of the 2021 NRL season.

In round 10 of the 2021 NRL season, Ravalawa scored a hat-trick in the club's 44–18 loss against Melbourne, his first in the NRL. Due to an illegal shoulder charge during this game, he again received a two match suspension.

On 22 June, Ravalawa was suspended for four games by the NRL after being placed on report for an illegal shoulder charge during the club's round 15 victory over Canberra. In round 24, Ravalawa scored two tries in a 26–38 loss against North Queensland.

=== 2022 ===
During the first round of the 2022 NRL season the St. George Illawarra defeated New Zealand Warriors 28–16 with Ravalawa scoring three tries.

In round 15 of the 2022 NRL season, Ravalawa scored two tries for St. George Illawarra in a 32–12 upset victory over South Sydney. Ravalawa played 14 games for St. George Illawarra in 2022 as the club finished 10th and missed the finals.

=== 2023 ===
On 21 February, Ravalawa was issued with a breach notice and fined by St. George Illawarra after he was involved in an altercation with teammate Zane Musgrove following the clubs Charity Shield loss to South Sydney in Mudgee. It was alleged that both players were heavily intoxicated after a night out of drinking following the game. It was reported that Ravalawa told club officials he was “too drunk to remember” what happened.

In round 5 of the 2023 NRL season, Ravalawa scored two tries for St. George Illawarra as they defeated the Dolphins team 38–12.

In round 14, Ravalawa scored two tries for St. George Illawarra in their 26–18 loss against Penrith. In round 19, Ravalawa scored a hat-trick in St. George Illawarra's 36–26 loss against Canberra. On 12 July, Ravalawa re-signed with St. George Illawarra until the end of 2026.

In round 23, Ravalawa equalled the St. George clubs try scoring record by crossing over for four tries in their 26–20 loss against Parramatta. Ravalawa would finish as the clubs top try scorer with 21 tries from 21 games. St. George Illawarra finished the year in 16th place.

=== 2024 ===
Ravalawa played 12 games for St. George Illawarra in the 2024 NRL season as the club finished 11th on the table. There had been reports through the year that Ravalawa had fallen out of favour with head coach Shane Flanagan and was reportedly told he could negotiate with other clubs.

=== 2025 ===
On 14 March, Ravalawa signed a loan deal with the South Sydney Rabbitohs for the 2025 season, though was expected to return to St. George Illawarra for the 2026 pre-season. On 29 August, it was announced that Ravalawa would not be returning to St. George Illawarra, but instead signed a three-year deal with Super League team Castleford Tigers.

=== 2026 ===
Ravalawa was assigned Castleford's number 5 shirt for the 2026 season. He made his debut against Doncaster in the Challenge Cup, and scored his first Super League try in round 1 against Wigan Warriors. In round 4 against Leeds Rhinos, Ravalawa scored a try and gained 200 metres, however received criticism for failing to challenge for a high kick. Having carried a leg injury throughout March, he was ruled out for two games to recover. On return in round 8, Ravalawa contributed a try-saving tackle on Jai Field in Castleford's victory against Wigan. A week later, however, his knee injury persisted and necessitated an extended layoff.

After over two months out, Ravalawa made a try-scoring return in round 18 against Leigh Leopards, and scored once again the following week in Castleford's win against Leeds.

On 30 July, Ravalawa joined Doncaster RLFC in the RFL Championship on loan from Castleford. He made two appearances and scored two tries for Doncaster before he was recalled by the Tigers on 12 August.

In his first match following his recall from loan, Ravalawa scored a try in Castleford's win against Hull FC. He featured sporadically in the final weeks of the season, finishing with five tries in fifteen appearances as the Tigers slipped to a 13th-placed finish.

On 11 November, Castleford announced Ravalawa had departed the club with immediate effect.

== Statistics ==
Appearances and points in all competitions by year
Club	Season	Tier	App	T	G	DG	Pts
St. George Illawarra Dragons	2019	NRL	19	11	0	0	44
St. George Illawarra Dragons	2020	NRL	16	13	0	0	52
St. George Illawarra Dragons	2021	NRL	16	14	0	0	56
St. George Illawarra Dragons	2022	NRL	14	5	0	0	20
St. George Illawarra Dragons	2023	NRL	21	21	0	0	84
St. George Illawarra Dragons	2024	NRL	12	3	0	0	12
St. George Illawarra Dragons	Total		98	67	0	0	268
→ South Sydney Rabbitohs (loan)	2025	NRL	3	0	0	0	0
Castleford Tigers	2026	Super League	15	5	0	0	20
→ Doncaster RLFC (loan)	2026	RFL Championship	2	2	0	0	8
Career total			118	74	0	0	296

As of match played 3 September 2026
