= Hamish Stewart (rugby league) =

Australian rugby league footballer (born 2004)

Hamish (Sid) Stewart
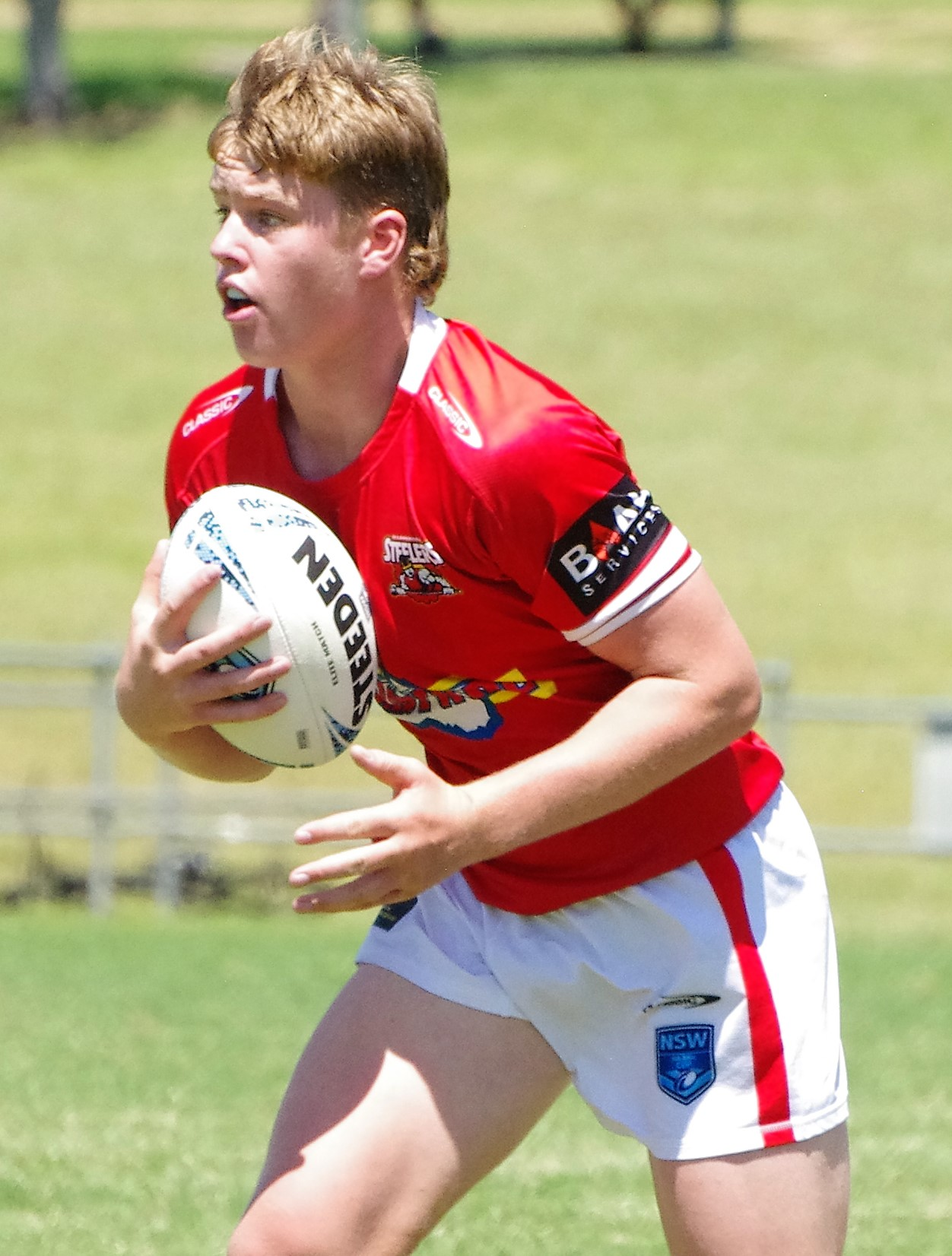

Personal information
- Full name: Hamish Stewart
- Born: 12 August 2004 (age 22) Gerringong, New South Wales, Australia
- Height: 187 cm (6 ft 2 in)
- Weight: 100 kg (15 st 10 lb)

Playing information
- Position: Lock, Second-row
Club
Years	Team	Pld	T	G	FG	P
2025–	St. George Illawarra	43	6	0	0	24
Representative
Years	Team	Pld	T	G	FG	P
2026	Prime Minister's XIII	1	0	0	0	0
- Source: As of 22 November 2026

Hamish Stewart (born 12 August 2004) is an Australian professional rugby league footballer who plays as a lock forward for the St. George Illawarra Dragons in the National Rugby League.

== Career ==
=== 2025 ===
In round 1 of the 2025 NRL season, Stewart made his NRL debut for St. George Illawarra against the Canterbury-Bankstown Bulldogs at Jubilee Oval. Stewart played 19 games for St. George Illawarra in the 2025 season as the club finished 15th on the ladder. On 31 October 2025, St. George Illawarra announced that Stewart had re-signed with the club until the end of 2029.

=== 2026 ===
He played 24 matches for St. George Illawarra in the 2026 NRL season as the club finished with the Wooden Spoon.

Stewart was awarded the 2026 Dally M Second Rower of the Year award after a breakout season where he played every game for the Dragons tallying 5 tries, 9 try assists, and a competition leading 996 tackles.

He made his Prime Minister's XIII début on 3 October 2026 in the 10-60 win over PNG Prime Minister's XIII in Port Moresby.
