= Lyhkan King-Togia =

NZ rugby league footballer (born 2004)

Personal information
- Full name: Lyhkan King-Togia
- Born: 12 May 2005 (age 21) Auckland, New Zealand
- Height: 180 cm (5 ft 11 in)
- Weight: 92 kg (14 st 7 lb)

Playing information
- Position: Five-eighth, Halfback
Club
Years	Team	Pld	T	G	FG	P
2024–	St. George Illawarra	31	4	0	0	16
- Source: As of 5 September 2026

Lyhkan King-Togia (born 12 May 2005) is an Australian professional rugby league footballer who plays as a five-eighth or halfback for the St. George Illawarra Dragons in the National Rugby League.

== Background ==
King-Togia was born in Auckland, New Zealand. He is the nephew of former Manly Warringah Sea Eagles and New Zealand representative Centre Steve Matai. He grew up in Dalby, Queensland, playing for the Dalby Devils and the Western Clydesdales in the Mal Meninga Cup, before being spotted by Ian Millward to join the Dragons pathway system in 2023.

King-Togia played for the Illawarra Steelers SG Ball team in 2023 and 2024, before transitioning into the Dragons Jersey Flegg squad. In 2023, King-Togia made his NSW Cup debut for the Dragons.

In round 24 of the 2024 NRL season, King-Tongia made his National Rugby League debut for St. George Illawarra against the Gold Coast Titans at WIN Stadium coming off the bench in a 32-16 win. He made his first NRL start at Five-Eighth in Round 27 against the Canberra Raiders at Jubilee Oval, scoring his first NRL try in a 26-24 loss.

King-Togia later re-signed with St. George Illawarra until the end of 2027. In the 2025 NRL season, he played 17 games for St. George Illawarra as they finished 15th on the table.

On the 7th October 2025, King-Togia was selected in the Samoan Squad for the 2025 Pacific Championships Tournament against New Zealand and Tonga. King-Togia played nine games for St. George Illawarra in the 2026 NRL season as the club finished with the Wooden Spoon. It was the clubs first wooden spoon and the first any St. George affiliated side had received since 1938.

== Statistics ==
Year	Team	Games	Tries	Pts
2024	St. George Illawarra Dragons	4	1	4
2025	St. George Illawarra Dragons	17	2	8
2026	St. George Illawarra Dragons	1		
	Totals	22	3	12
