= Connor Muhleisen =

Australian rugby league player

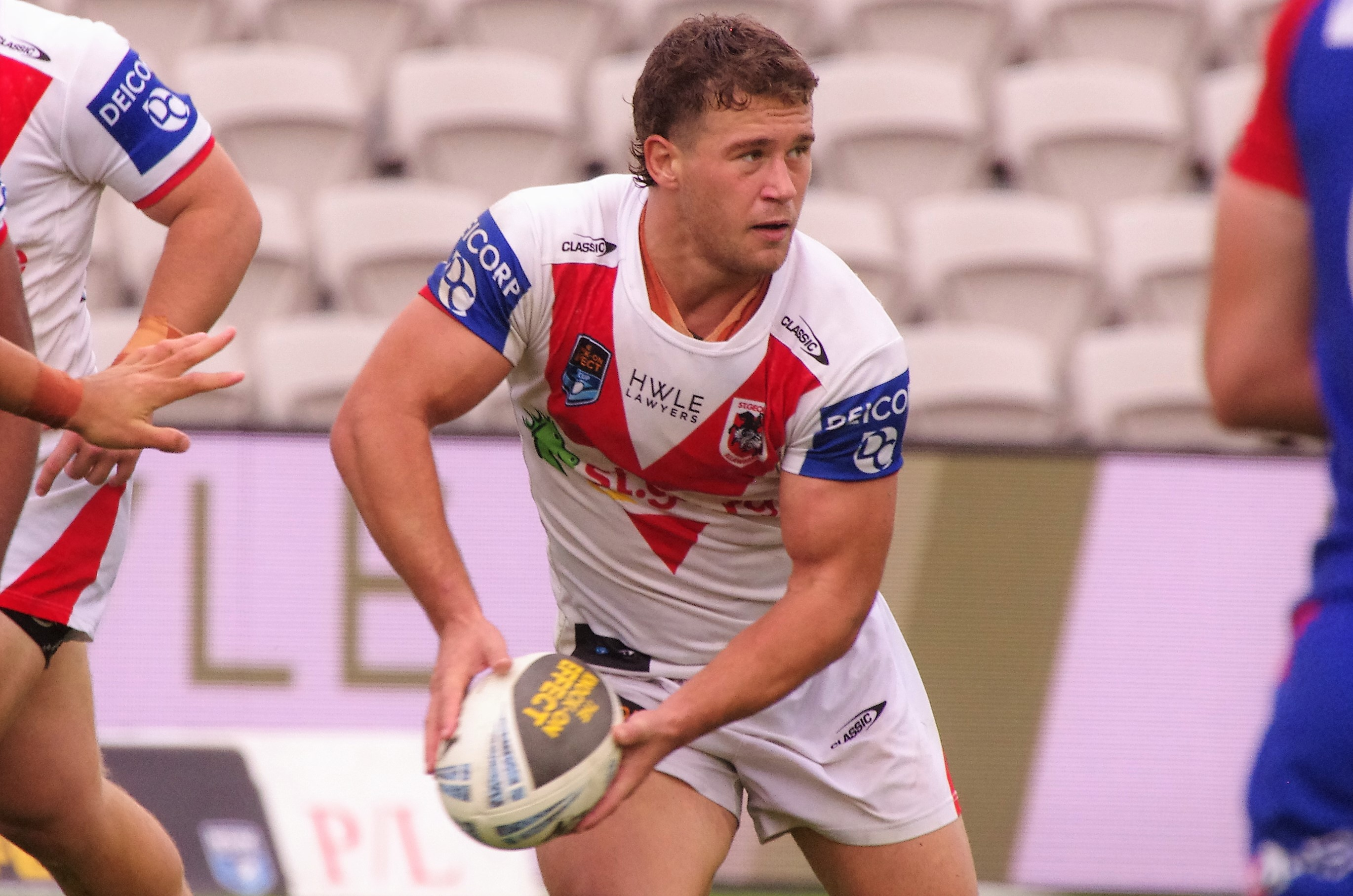

Personal information
- Full name: Connor Muhleisen
- Born: 19 February 2001 (age 25) Wollongong, New South Wales, Australia
- Height: 167
- Weight: 87 kg (192 lb; 13 st 10 lb)

Playing information
- Position: Hooker
Club
Years	Team	Pld	T	G	FG	P
2023–	St. George Illawarra	11	1	0	0	4

Connor Muhleisen (/mʌlaɪzən/) (born 19 February 2001) is an Australian professional rugby league player who plays as a hooker for the St. George Illawarra Dragons in the National Rugby League and NSW Cup.

== Background ==
Muhleisen was born in Wollongong, New South Wales. He played junior rugby league for Thirroul Butchers.

== Playing career ==
A Wollondilly junior, Muhleisen was contracted to the St. George Illawarra Dragons as a junior coming through the academy system.

In round 22 of the 2023 NRL season, Muhleisen made his first grade debut for the St. George Illawarra Dragons in his side's 24−18 loss to Manly at WIN Stadium. On 28 September 2025, Muhleisen played in St. George Illawarra's 30-12 NSW Cup Grand Final loss to New Zealand.
