= Galoa Island =

Island of Fiji

- Island
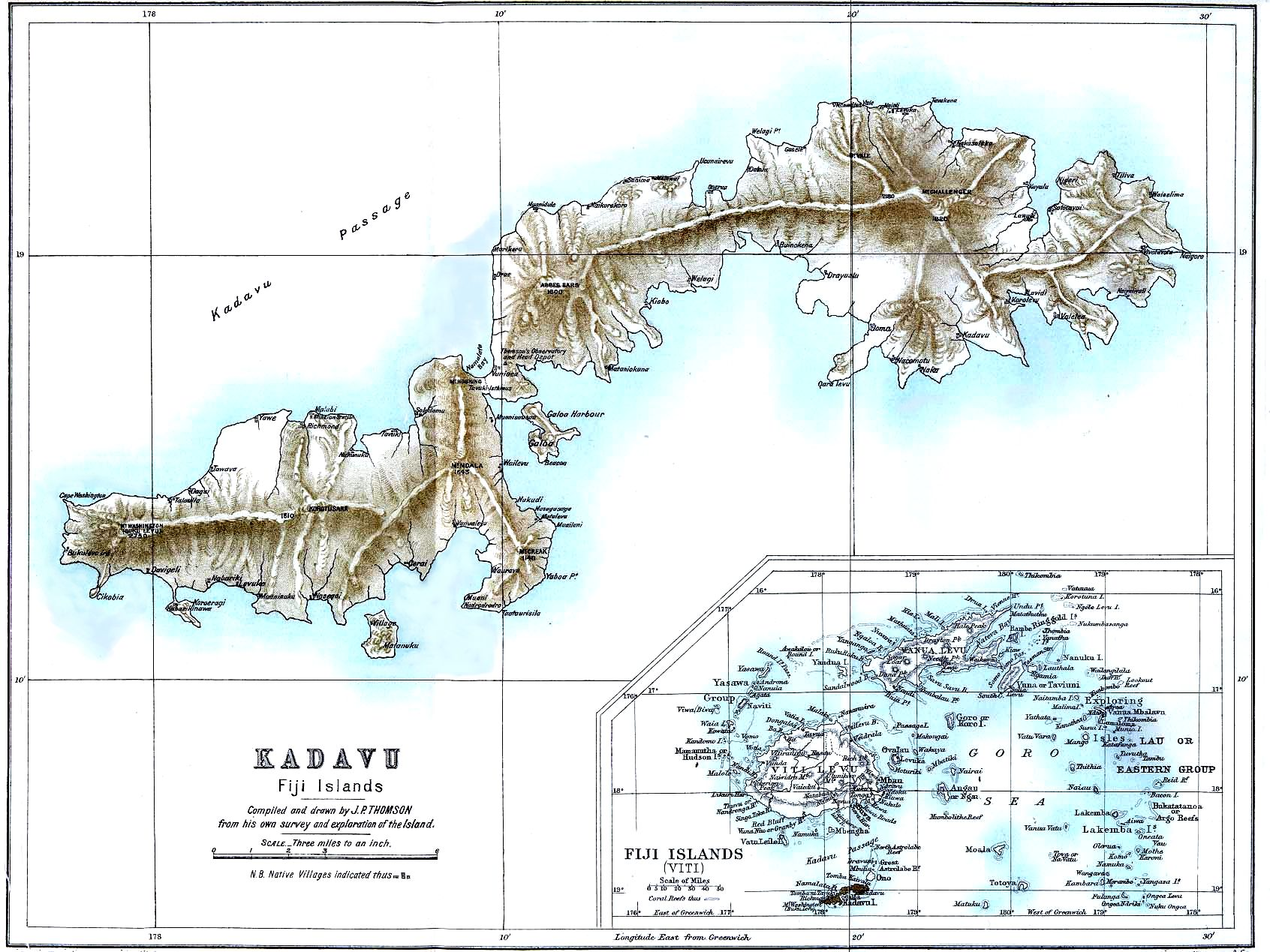
- Kadavu Island & Fiji Archipelago - 1889

- Location in Fiji
- Country: Fiji
- Island group: Kadavu Group
- Division: Eastern Division
- Province: Kadavu
- District: Tavuki

Galoa is a volcanic island of the Kadavu Group of Fiji. It is located in the south of Kadavu and can be reached only by boat. It has an average elevation of 11 meters.
