= Viliami Fifita =

Australian rugby league footballer

Vili Fifita
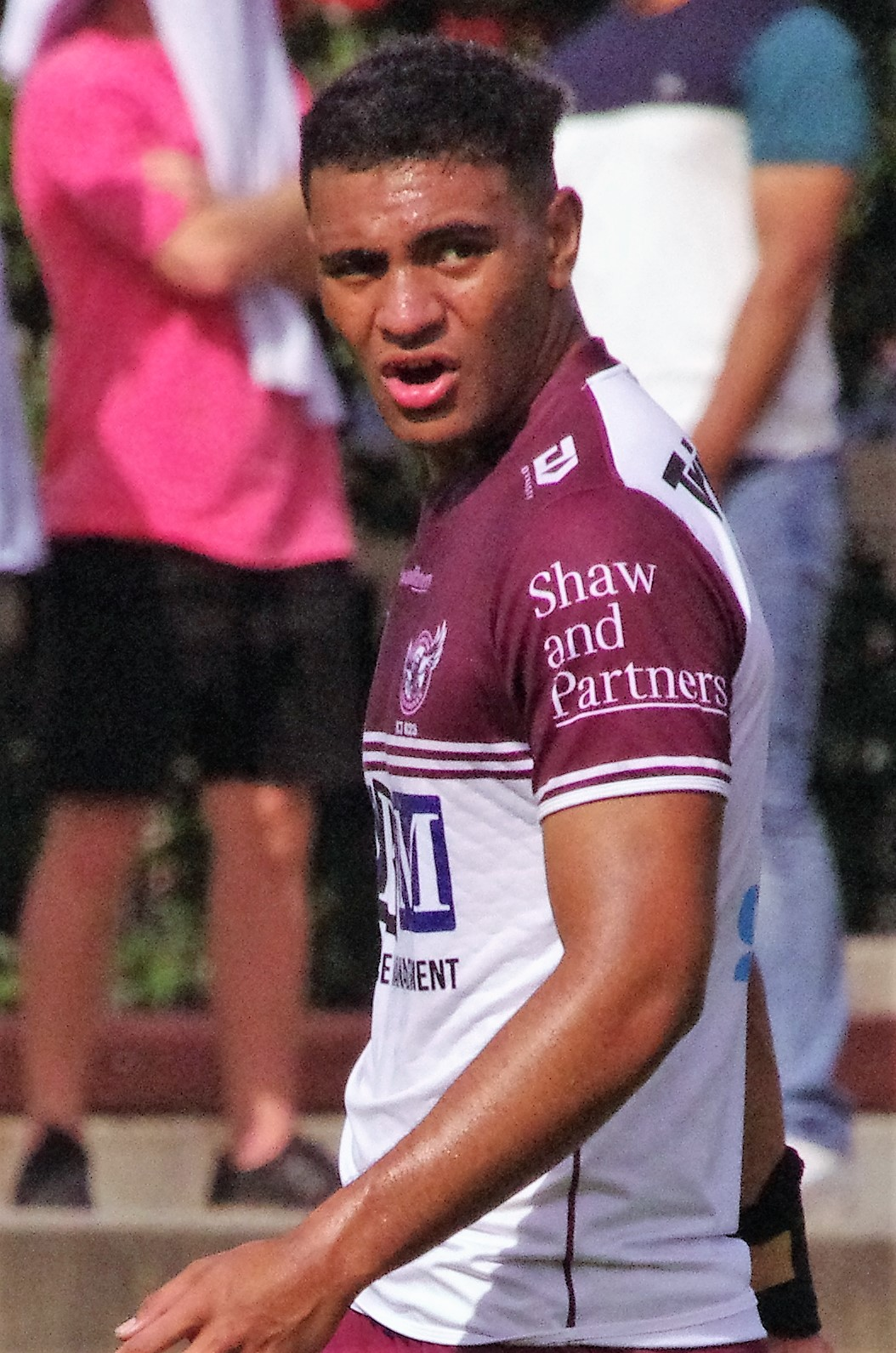

Personal information
- Full name: Viliami Fifita
- Born: 9 January 2001 (age 25) Fairfield, New South Wales, Australia
- Height: 194 cm (6 ft 4 in)
- Weight: 109 kg (17 st 2 lb)

Playing information
- Position: Prop
Club
Years	Team	Pld	T	G	FG	P
2024–25	St. George Illawarra	4	0	0	0	0
2026–	Manly Warringah Sea Eagles	0	0	0	0	0
	Total	4	0	0	0	0
- Source: As of 5 July 2025

Viliami Fifita (born 9 January 2001) is an Australian professional rugby league footballer who plays as a prop for the Manly Warringah Sea Eagles in the NRL.

== Playing career ==
In round 1 of the 2024 NRL season, Fifita made his first grade debut for St. George Illawarra in their 28-4 victory over the Gold Coast.

Fifita returned to Manly on a one year deal for 2026.
