= Dylan Egan =

Australian rugby league footballer

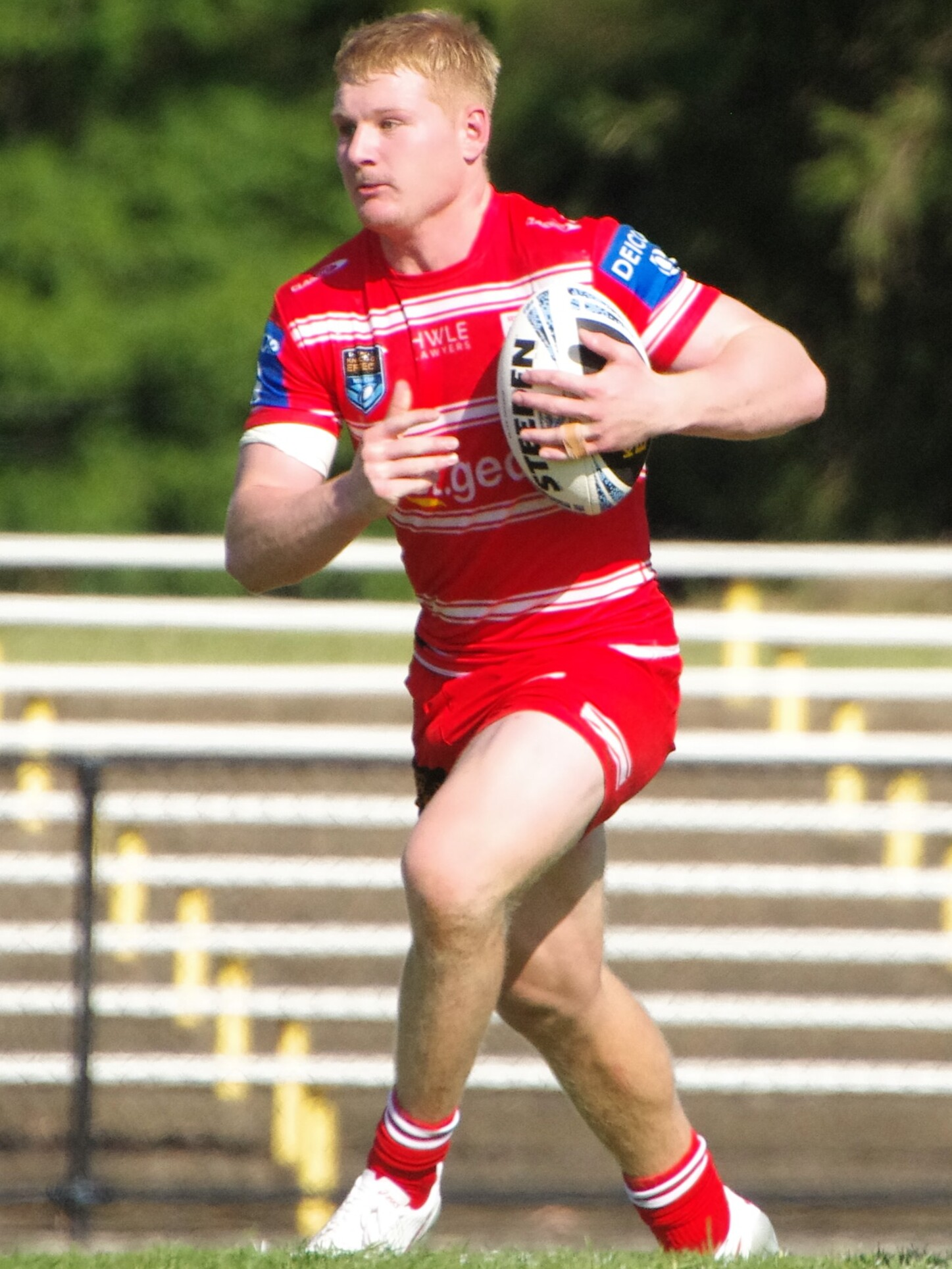

Personal information
- Full name: Dylan Egan
- Born: 5 September 2004 (age 22) Nowra, New South Wales, Australia
- Height: 181 cm (5 ft 11 in)
- Weight: 98 kg (15 st 6 lb)

Playing information
- Position: Second-row, Lock
Club
| Years | Team | Pld | T | G | FG | P |
|---|---|---|---|---|---|---|
| 2025– | St. George Illawarra | 24 | 5 | 0 | 0 | 20 |
- Source: As of 6 November 2026

Dylan Egan (born 5 September 2004) is an Australian professional rugby league footballer who plays as a second-row forward for the St. George Illawarra Dragons in the National Rugby League.

== Background ==
Egan played his junior football for the Gerringong Lions, before signing with the St. George Illawarra Dragons, playing for their feeder club the Illawarra Steelers in Harold Matthews and SG Ball.

== Career ==
Egan played for the Dragons in NSW Cup in 2024, re-signing with the Dragons until the end of 2027. In round 4 2025, Egan made his NRL debut for the Dragons against the Melbourne Storm. Coming off the bench in a 14-8 win at Nestrata Stadium.

Egan's rookie season was cut short, suffering an ACL tear in round 10 against the Brisbane Broncos at Suncorp Stadium. On 18 March 2026, St. George announced that Egan had re-signed with the club until the end of 2029. Egan played 14 matches for St. George Illawarra in the 2026 NRL season as the club finished with the Wooden Spoon. It was the clubs first wooden spoon and the first any St. George affiliated side had received since 1938.
