= Zac Lomax =

Australia rugby union footballer

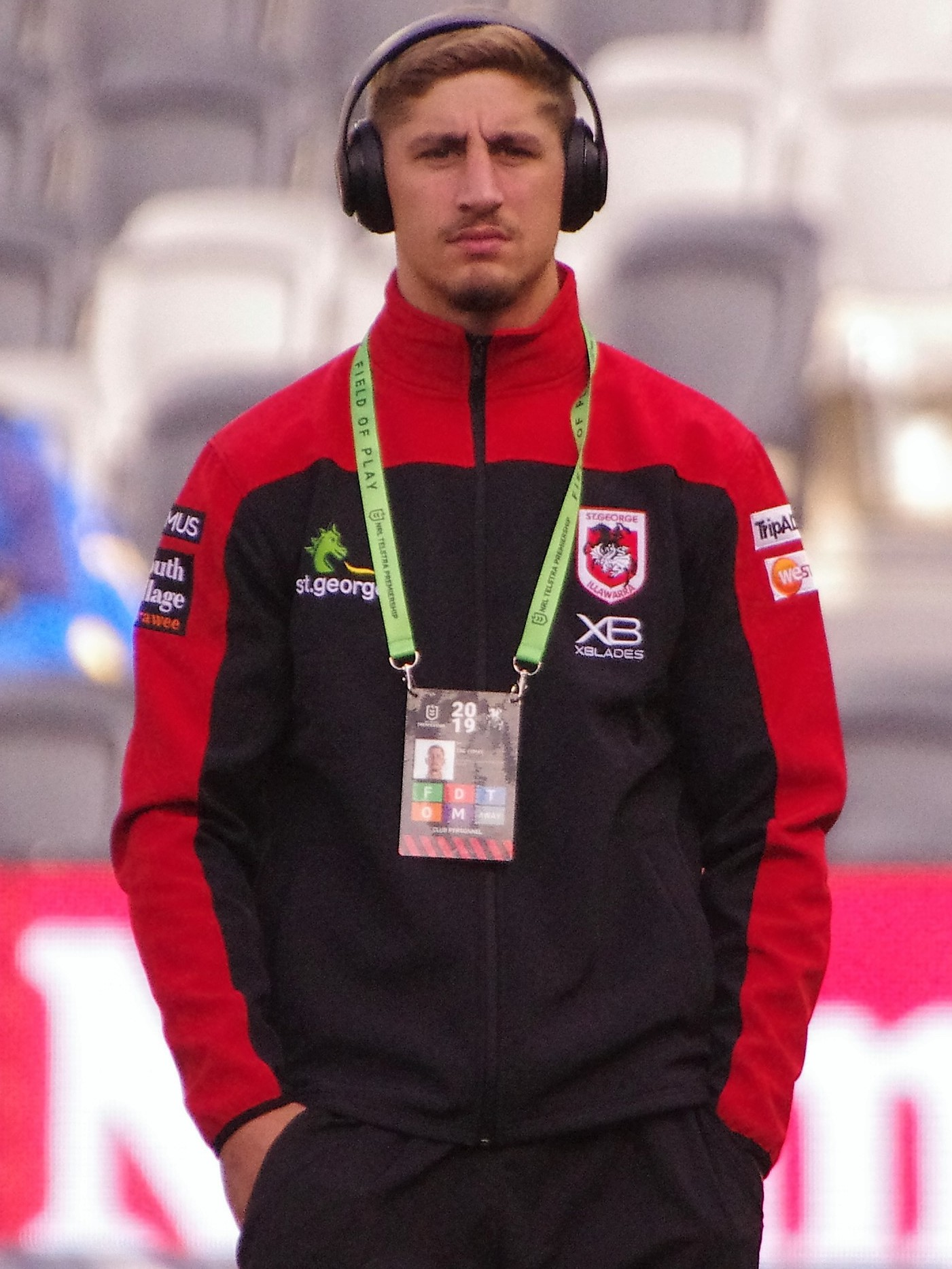

Personal information
- Born: 24 September 1999 (age 27) Temora, New South Wales, Australia
- Height: 190 cm (6 ft 3 in)
- Weight: 105 kg (231 lb; 16 st 7 lb)

Playing information

Rugby league
- Position: Centre, Wing
Club
Years	Team	Pld	T	G	FG	P
2018–24	St. George Illawarra	114	49	315	3	831
2025	Parramatta Eels	19	9	53	1	143
	Total	133	58	368	4	974
Representative
Years	Team	Pld	T	G	FG	P
2018–23	Prime Minister's XIII	3	1	18	0	40
2024–25	New South Wales	6	5	10	0	40
2024	Australia	3	2	8	0	24

Rugby union
- Position: Wing, Centre
Club
Years	Team	Pld	T	G	FG	P
2026–	Western Force	7	2	0	0	10
Representative
Years	Team	Pld	T	G	FG	P
2026–	Australia A	1	0	0	0	0
- Source: As of 01 November 2026

Zac Lomax (born 24 September 1999) is an Australian rugby union player (and former rugby league player) who currently plays as a winger for the Western Force in Super Rugby.

He previously played for the Parramatta Eels and St. George Illawarra in the NRL. He has also played as a centre and fullback in his career.

== Early life ==
Lomax was born in Temora, New South Wales, Australia. In 2011, before turning to rugby league, Lomax made the NSW primary school rugby union team.

He played his junior rugby league for the Temora Dragons, where he once scored 40 points in a game that ended 100–0.

== Career ==
=== Early career ===
Lomax is a graduate of the Illawarra Steelers' SG Ball team and was named in both the Australian Schoolboys and NSW Under-18s teams in 2016 and 2017. In 2017, Lomax was awarded NSWRL's Under-18s Player of the Year.

=== 2018 ===
Lomax made his NRL debut for St. George Illawarra in round 10 of the 2018 NRL season against South Sydney. Lomax played in both finals games for St. George Illawarra in the 2018 NRL season. Lomax kicked three goals in week one of the finals series as St. George Illawarra defeated Brisbane 48–18 in an upset victory at Suncorp Stadium. The following week, Lomax kicked four goals as St. George Illawarra were defeated by Souths 13–12 at ANZ Stadium in the elimination final. Lomax was named in the Prime Ministers XIII, New South Wales U18 for 2018, and also appeared in Brad Fittler's Emerging Blues camp, Zac also scored 5 goals in the PM XIII 34–18 win over PNG.

Altogether Lomax played 2018 NRL season 4 games for St. George Illawarra winning two and losing two. He scored 11 goals with 22 points all together for the season.

=== 2019 ===
In the 2019 NRL season, Lomax played 10 games, scoring five tries and 15 goals before injuring his thumb at training, he returned in the round 19 loss against South Sydney. In December 2019, Lomax extended his contract until the end of the 2025 season.

Altogether Lomax played 13 games in the 2019 season for the St. George Illawarra Dragons winning five and losing nine. He scored five tries and 15 goals with a total of 50 points.

=== 2020 ===
In October, Lomax was named in the New South Wales State of Origin preliminary squad.

Altogether Lomax played 20 games for the St. George Illawarra Dragons in the 2020 NRL season. He won seven games and lost 13 games. Lomax scored 13 tries and kicked 63 goals for a combined 178 points the best in his career to date.

=== 2021 ===
In round 3 of the 2021 NRL season, Lomax scored two tries and kicked seven goals in a 38–12 victory over Manly-Warringah at WIN Stadium.

In round 8 against the Wests Tigers, Lomax suffered a suspected broken thumb in the club's 16–8 loss at WIN Stadium.

Lomax played a total of 12 matches for the St. George Illawarra Dragons in the 2021 NRL season. Winning four and losing eight. He scored four tries and kicked 35 goals for 86 points altogether for the season. As the Dragons finished 11th on the table and missed out on the finals for the third year in a row.

=== 2022 ===
In round 6 of 2022 NRL season, Lomax was involved in an incident during a try celebration where he decided to jump on the back of former teammate Tyson Frizell. Lomax was given a grade one contrary conduct charge and fined $1,000 by the judiciary. In round 24, Lomax kicked a penalty goal in the final minute to win the game for St. George Illawarra 24–22 over the Wests Tigers. The result meant that the Wests Tigers would finish with the Wooden Spoon for the first time in their history. Lomax played 24 games for St. George Illawarra throughout the year and finished as the clubs top point scorer with 167 points. Lomax was selected for the Prime Minister's XIII on 25 September, which he scored 20 points including one try and eight conversions.

Altogether Lomax played 24 games for the St. George Illawarra Dragons in the 2022 NRL season. Lomax won 12 games and lost 12 games. Lomax scored six tries and kicked 71 goals as he scored 167 points. The St. George side missed out on finals for the fourth year in the row as the club came 10th.

=== 2023 ===
On 2 May, Lomax was dropped by Anthony Griffin after a four-game losing streak.

In round 19, Lomax scored two tries and kicked five goals in St. George's 36–26 loss against Canberra. In round 213, Lomax injured his shoulder against the Parramatta Eels. He missed round 24 against South Sydney and round 25 against the Melbourne Storm. Lomax played a total of 20 games for St. George Illawarra in the 2023 NRL season as the club finished 16th on the table.

=== 2024 ===
In round 3 of the 2024 NRL season, Lomax scored two tries and kicked four goals in St. George Illawarra's 46–24 loss against North Queensland. On 2 April, it was announced that Lomax would depart St. George Illawarra at the end of the season after being granted an early release from his contract which was due to expire in 2026. On 16 April, it was announced that Lomax had signed a four-year deal with Parramatta starting in 2025. In round 7, Lomax played his 100th first grade game in St. George Illawarra's 30–12 upset victory over the New Zealand Warriors.

On 26 May, Lomax was named on the wing for New South Wales ahead of game one in the 2024 State of Origin series. Lomax scored a try on his Origin debut as New South Wales lost 38–10. In round 14, Lomax scored a club record 32 points (three tries and ten goals) in St. George Illawarra's 56–14 victory over the Wests Tigers. In game two of the 2024 State of Origin series, Lomax scored two tries and kicked five goals in New South Wales 38–18 victory over Queensland. Lomax would later play in game three of the series as New South Wales won 14–4 in Brisbane to claim the shield for the first time since 2021.

Although Lomax was against being moved from centre to the wing at the start of the season by Dragons coach Shane Flanagan, as it would turn out it his form would be such that not only did he make his State of Origin debut for New South Wales in 2024, but he was also named on the wing in the 2024 Dally M Team of the Year and was later selected to the Australian squad for the 2024 Pacific Championships. Lomax made his test debut on the wing for Australia in the opening game of the Pacific Championships on 18 October at the Suncorp Stadium in Brisbane, kicking 3 goals in the Kangaroos 18–0 win over Tonga.

=== 2025 ===
Lomax made his club debut for Parramatta in round 1 of the 2025 NRL season against the Melbourne Storm which saw the side lose 56–18.

On 5 April, Lomax kicked a game tying penalty with three minutes remaining, and a game winning field goal in golden point to secure Parramatta their first win of the season under new head coach Jason Ryles, Lomax was seen emotional after the game against his former club. In round 11, Lomax scored two tries and kicked four goals in Parramatta's 28–6 victory over Newcastle. Lomax was selected by New South Wales ahead of the 2025 State of Origin series. In game one, Lomax scored two tries in New South Wales' 18–6 victory. Lomax was retained for game two of the series but had a horror night with the goal kicking duties only scoring two out of a possible five conversions which ultimately cost New South Wales the match and a chance of winning the series as Queensland won 26–24. Lomax was retained for game three where New South Wales would lose the match 24-12 and the series 2–1. Lomax played 19 matches for Parramatta in the 2025 NRL season as the club finished 11th on the table.

On 16 November 2025, Parramatta announced that Lomax was released from the remainder of his four-year contract to pursue other opportunities outside of the NRL. Lomax had been heavily linked with R360 for some time. On 3 December, it was revealed that the R360 competition had failed to launch which meant that Lomax's planned move had fallen through leaving him potentially without a club to play for in 2026. In late December, it was reported that Lomax had allegedly hired a lawyer in order to get a full release from his contract with Parramatta so he could join Melbourne ahead of the 2026 NRL season.

=== 2026 ===
On 23 January, it was announced by the Parramatta club that they would be taking Lomax to the NSW Supreme Court over the contract. The Parramatta club issued a statement which in part said that when Parramatta agreed to his release, it included a clause that Lomax not play for another NRL club before the expiry of his Parramatta contract at the end of 2028. On 3 March, Lomax lost his case in the Supreme Court and it was agreed by Lomax and the Parramatta club that he was not allowed to play for another NRL team until the end of 2028 without Parramatta's consent.

On 9 March, Lomax signed a two-year deal with Rugby Australia and the Western Force. His signing marks the third NRL player to sign for the rival sporting code in 2026 following Angus Crichton and Mark Nawaqanitawase. The signing means he could play in the Australian hosted Rugby World Cup 2027.

== NRL Statistics ==
Season	Team	Pld	T	G	FG	P
2018	St. George Illawarra Dragons	4	-	11	-	22
2019	St. George Illawarra Dragons	13	5	15	-	50
2020	St. George Illawarra Dragons	20	13	63	-	178
2021	St. George Illawarra Dragons	12	4	35	-	86
2022	St. George Illawarra Dragons	24	6	71	1	167
2023	St. George Illawarra Dragons	20	7	57	-	142
2024	St. George Illawarra Dragons	21	14	639	2	186
2025	Parramatta Eels	14	7	33	1	95
	Totals	129	56	3462	4	926

== Super Rugby Statistics ==
Season	Team	Pld	T	G	FG	P	
2026	Western Force	1	1	-	-	-	
	Western Force	Totals	1	-	-	-	-

== Personal life ==
Lomax's older brother, Hayden Lomax, used to be in the development squad for the St. George Illawarra Dragons.

Lomax was dating Jessica Sergis, who plays in the NRL Women's Premiership. Due to COVID-19 protocols, Sergis had to move out of their shared household in 2020.

In 2022, it was confirmed that Lomax has a new partner, Tahlia Thornton, who is a swimmer for the Australian Swim Team.
