= 2025 NRL season =

Australian rugby league season

2025 National Rugby League
- Duration: 1 March (Note: Local time in Las Vegas.) – 5 October 2025
- Teams: 17
- Premiers: Brisbane Broncos (7th title)
- Minor premiers: Canberra Raiders (2nd title)
- Matches played: 213
- Points scored: 9,654
- Average attendance: 21,418
- Total attendance: 4,390,791
- Top points scorer: Jamayne Isaako (278)
- Wooden spoon: Newcastle Knights (5th spoon)
- Biggest home win: Storm 64–0 Tigers; AAMI Park; 11 May, Round 10
- Biggest away win: Cowboys 4–58 Dolphins; Queensland Country Bank Stadium; 14 June, Round 15
- Dally M Medal: James Tedesco
- Top try-scorer: Mark Nawaqanitawase (24)

The 2025 NRL season was the 118th season of professional rugby league in Australia and the 28th season run by the National Rugby League (NRL). The regular season was followed by a finals series contested by the top eight teams on the competition ladder. The Canberra Raiders were the minor premiers, while the Brisbane Broncos won their seventh premiership.

The season recorded the highest aggregate and average regular season crowds in first-grade rugby league history, surpassing the record set the previous year.

== Teams ==
The lineup of teams in the league remained unchanged for the 3rd consecutive year, with seventeen participating in the regular season: ten from New South Wales, four from Queensland and one from each of Victoria, the Australian Capital Territory and New Zealand.

Club	Season	Home ground(s)	Head coach	Captain(s)
Brisbane Broncos	38th season	Suncorp Stadium	Michael Maguire	Adam Reynolds
Canberra Raiders	44th season	GIO Stadium	Ricky Stuart	Joseph Tapine
Canterbury-Bankstown Bulldogs	91st season	Accor Stadium and Belmore Sports Ground	Cameron Ciraldo	Stephen Crichton
Cronulla-Sutherland Sharks	59th season	Sharks Stadium	Craig Fitzgibbon	Cameron McInnes
Dolphins	3rd season	Suncorp Stadium and Kayo Stadium	Kristian Woolf	Tom Gilbert → Isaiya Katoa & Felise Kaufusi (Note: Gilbert suffered a season-ending injury in Round 11. Vice captain Kaufusi initially filled in as sole captain before sharing the duties with Isaiya Katoa)
Gold Coast Titans	19th season	Cbus Super Stadium	Des Hasler	Tino Fa'asuamaleaui
Manly Warringah Sea Eagles	76th season	4 Pines Park	Anthony Seibold	Daly Cherry-Evans and Tom Trbojevic
Melbourne Storm	28th season	AAMI Park	Craig Bellamy	Harry Grant
Newcastle Knights	38th season	McDonald Jones Stadium	Adam O'Brien	Kalyn Ponga
New Zealand Warriors	31st season	Go Media Stadium	Andrew Webster	Mitchell Barnett and James Fisher-Harris
North Queensland Cowboys	31st season	Queensland Country Bank Stadium	Todd Payten	Reuben Cotter and Tom Dearden
Parramatta Eels	79th season	CommBank Stadium	Jason Ryles	Mitchell Moses
Penrith Panthers	59th season	CommBank Stadium (Note: Penrith's usual home ground, BlueBet Stadium, is not usable due to ongoing renovations)	Ivan Cleary	Nathan Cleary and Isaah Yeo
South Sydney Rabbitohs	116th season	Accor Stadium	Wayne Bennett	Cameron Murray → Cody Walker (Note: Murray suffered a season-ending injury in the pre-season. When available, Walker filled in as captain.)
St. George Illawarra Dragons	27th season	Jubilee Stadium and WIN Stadium	Shane Flanagan	Damien Cook and Clint Gutherson
Sydney Roosters	118th season	Allianz Stadium	Trent Robinson	James Tedesco
Wests Tigers	26th season	CommBank Stadium, Leichhardt Oval and Campbelltown Sports Stadium	Benji Marshall	Apisai Koroisau and Jarome Luai

== Pre-season ==
=== Trials ===
Italics indicates a non-NRL club

Date	Time	Home	Score	Away	Stadium	Report
8 February 2025	17:00 AEST (UTC+10:00)	Burleigh Bears	0–22	Brisbane Broncos	UAA Oval, Gold Coast	Report
8 February 2025	18:00 AEST (UTC+10:00)	Central Queensland Capras	22–20	Dolphins	Marley Brown Oval, Gladstone	Report

=== All Stars match ===
15 February 2025
19:30 AEDT

Indigenous All Stars	6–10	(Māori people) Māori All Stars
Tries: 1 Mitchell 41'; Goals: 1 Puru 1/1 43'	Report	Tries: 2 Arthars 57'; Laban 67'; Goals: 1 Hiroti 0/1; Nikorima 1/1 68'

CommBank Stadium, Sydney
Attendance: 21,328
Referee: Todd Smith

=== Pre-season Challenge ===
The 17-game pre-season challenge was played from 7 February to 23 February 2025, being won for a second straight year by the Brisbane Broncos.

== Regular season ==
=== Results ===
Team	1	2	3	4	5	6	7	8	9	10	11	12	13	14	15	16	17	18	19	20	21	22	23	24	25	26	27	F1	F2	F3	GF
Brisbane Broncos	SYD +36	CAN −10	**NQL** **+10**	DOL +8	**WTI** **+22**	**SYD** **−10**	NZL −2*	**CBY** **+24**	PEN –24	SOU –8	**SGI** **–4**	X	MAN –28	**GCT** **+30**	X	**CRO** **+6**	**NZL** **+14**	CBY +4	GCT +12	X	**PAR** **–2**	**SOU** **+46**	MEL –20	**DOL** **+10**	NEW +34	NQL +8	**MEL** **+16**	CAN +1*	X	**PEN** **+2**	MEL +4
Canberra Raiders	**NZL** **+22**	**BRI** **+10**	MAN −28	NQL −10	**CRO** **+4**	PAR +38	GCT +10	**DOL** **+12**	MEL +2*	**CBY** **–12**	**GCT** **+16**	NZL +6	SYD +2	**SOU** **+24**	X	WTI +4	NEW +4	**SGI** **+4**	X	**PAR** **+24**	**NEW** **+26**	SGI –6	**MAN** **+16**	X	PEN +4*	**WTI** **+14**	DOL –38	**BRI** **–1***	**CRO** **–20**		
Canterbury-Bankstown Bulldogs	SGI +8	**GCT** **+16**	PAR +8	CRO +14	**NEW** **+20**	X	**SOU** **+32**	BRI −24	GCT +20	CAN +12	**SYD** **+4**	**DOL** **–36**	X	**PAR** **+18**	SOU +6	X	PEN –2	**BRI** **–4**	NQL +4	**SGI** **+2**	**MAN** **+38**	WTI –14	**NZL** **+18**	SYD –20	MEL –6	**PEN** **+24**	**CRO** **–18**	MEL –8	PEN −20		
Cronulla-Sutherland Sharks	PEN −6	NQL +24	**SOU** **+15**	**CBY** **−14**	CAN −4	**MAN** **+6**	NEW +20	WTI –2*	**PAR** **+10**	MAN +16	**MEL** **+5**	SYD –26	X	**NZL** **–30**	**SGI** **+12**	BRI –6	MEL –24	X	**DOL** **+12**	**SYD** **+13**	SOU +2	**NQL** **+20**	SGI –8	**GCT** **+32**	X	**NEW** **+24**	CBY +18	**SYD** **+10**	CAN +20	MEL –8	
Dolphins	SOU −2	NEW −14	**WTI** **−12**	**BRI** **−8**	GCT +26	**PEN** **+18**	**MEL** **+20**	CAN −12	SYD −10	PAR +4	**NZL** **–4**	CBY +36	X	**SGI** **+50**	NQL +54	**NEW** **–6**	**SOU** **+22**	X	CRO −12	**NQL** **+19**	X	NZL +2	**SYD** **–52**	BRI –10	MAN –28	**GCT** **+6**	**CAN** **+38**				
Gold Coast Titans	X	CBY −16	**NEW** **+20**	SYD +18	**DOL** **−26**	SGI −22	**CAN** **−10**	NQL −32	**CBY** **–20**	NEW +4	CAN –16	X	**MEL** **–12**	BRI –30	**MAN** **+20**	PAR –16	**NQL** **–6**	X	**BRI** **–12**	WTI –1	NZL +8	**PEN** **–4***	**SOU** **–2**	CRO –32	**NZL** **–14**	DOL –6	**WTI** **+8**				
Manly Warringah Sea Eagles	**NQL** **+30**	NZL −20	**CAN** **+28**	**PAR** **+14**	**MEL** **−24**	CRO −6	**SGI** **−2**	PEN +16	X	**CRO** **–16**	NQL +18	PAR –20	**BRI** **+28**	NEW –4*	GCT –20	X	**WTI** **+18**	**SOU** **+18**	X	MEL +2	CBY –38	**SYD** **–16**	CAN –16	WTI –14	**DOL** **+28**	SGI +16	**NZL** **+1**				
Melbourne Storm	**PAR** **+38**	X	**PEN** **+6**	SGI −6	MAN +24	**NZL** **+28**	DOL –20	**SOU** **+8**	**CAN** **–2***	**WTI** **+64**	CRO –5	X	GCT +12	**NQL** **+24**	X	SOU +1*	**CRO** **+24**	NQL +6	NEW +18	**MAN** **–2**	SYD +4	PAR +6	**BRI** **+20**	PEN +4*	**CBY** **+6**	**SYD** **–30**	BRI –16	**CBY** **+8**	X	CRO +8	**BRI** **–4**
Newcastle Knights	WTI +2	**DOL** **+14**	GCT −22	X	CBY −20	**WTI** **–16**	**CRO** **−20**	NZL –14	SOU +26	**GCT** **–4**	**PAR** **–22**	PEN +19	SGI –14	**MAN** **+4***	**SYD** **–4**	DOL +6	**CAN** **−4**	X	**MEL** **–18**	**NZL** **–5**	CAN –26	X	**PEN** **–36**	NQL –34	**BRI** **–34**	CRO –24	PAR –56				
New Zealand Warriors	CAN −22	**MAN** **+20**	**SYD** **+8**	WTI +2	X	MEL –28	**BRI** **+2***	**NEW** **+14**	**NQL** **+4**	SGI +1	DOL +4	**CAN** **–6**	SOU +6	CRO +30	X	**PEN** **–10**	**BRI** **–14**	X	**WTI** **+20**	NEW +5	**GCT** **–8**	**DOL** **–2**	CBY –18	**SGI** **+4**	GCT +14	**PAR** **–4**	MAN –1	**PEN** **–16**			
North Queensland Cowboys	MAN −30	**CRO** **−24**	BRI −10	**CAN** **+10**	PEN +4	SOU +8	X	**GCT** **+32**	NZL –4	**PEN**; **0***	**MAN** **–18**	X	**WTI** **+4**	MEL –24	**DOL** **–54**	SYD –34	GCT +6	**MEL** **–6**	**CBY** **−4**	DOL –19	**SGI** **+6**	CRO –20	PAR –1	**NEW** **+34**	WTI +6	**BRI** **–8**	X				
Parramatta Eels	MEL −38	**WTI** **−26**	**CBY** **−8**	MAN −14	**SGI** **+1***	**CAN** **−38**	WTI +16	X	CRO −10	**DOL** **–4**	NEW +22	**MAN** **+20**	PEN –8	CBY –18	X	**GCT** **+16**	SGI –14	X	**PEN** **–22**	CAN –24	BRI +2	**MEL** **–6**	**NQL** **+1**	SOU –4	**SYD** **+20**	NZL +4	**NEW** **+56**				
Penrith Panthers	**CRO** **+6**	**SYD** **−6**	MEL −6	SOU −10	**NQL** **−4**	DOL −18	SYD +28	**MAN** **−16**	**BRI** **+24**	NQL; 0*	X	**NEW** **–19**	**PAR** **+8**	WTI +4	X	NZL +10	**CBY** **+2**	X	PAR +22	**SOU** **+20**	**WTI** **+34**	GCT +4*	NEW +36	**MEL** **–4***	**CAN** **–4***	CBY –24	SGI +20	NZL +16	CBY +20	BRI –2	
South Sydney Rabbitohs	**DOL** **+2**	SGI +1	CRO −15	**PEN** **+10**	**SYD** **+6**	**NQL** **−8**	CBY –32	MEL −8	**NEW** **–26**	**BRI** **+8**	WTI +10	X	**NZL** **–6**	CAN –24	**CBY** **–6**	**MEL** **−1***	DOL –22	MAN –18	X	PEN –20	**CRO** **–2**	BRI –46	GCT +2	**PAR** **+4**	**SGI** **+40**	X	SYD –30				
St. George Illawarra Dragons	**CBY** **−8**	**SOU** **−1**	X	**MEL** **+6**	PAR −1*	**GCT** **+22**	MAN +2	SYD −28	WTI –6	**NZL** **–1**	BRI +4	X	**NEW** **+14**	DOL –50	CRO –12	X	**PAR** **+14**	CAN –4	**SYD** **–7**	CBY –2	NQL −6	**CAN** **+6**	**CRO** **+8**	NZL –4	SOU –40	**MAN** **–16**	**PEN** **–20**				
Sydney Roosters	**BRI** **−36**	PEN +6	NZL −8	**GCT** **−18**	SOU −6	BRI +10	**PEN** **−28**	**SGI** **+28**	**DOL** **+10**	X	CBY –4	**CRO** **+26**	**CAN** **–2**	X	NEW +4	**NQL** **+34**	X	**WTI** **–2**	SGI +7	CRO –13	**MEL** **–4**	MAN +16	DOL +52	**CBY** **+20**	PAR –20	MEL +30	**SOU** **+30**	CRO –10			
Wests Tigers	**NEW** **−2**	PAR +26	DOL +12	**NZL** **−2**	BRI −22	NEW +16	**PAR** **−16**	**CRO** **+2***	**SGI** **+6**	MEL –64	**SOU** **–10**	X	NQL –4	**PEN** **–4**	X	**CAN** **–4**	MAN −18	SYD +2	NZL –20	**GCT** **+1**	PEN –34	**CBY** **+14**	X	**MAN** **+14**	**NQL** **–6**	CAN –14	GCT –8				
Team	1	2	3	4	5	6	7	8	9	10	11	12	13	14	15	16	17	18	19	20	21	22	23	24	25	26	27	F1	F2	F3	GF

Bold – Home game
X – Bye
* – Golden point game
Opponent for round listed above margin

== Ladder ==
Pos	Team	Pld	W	D	L	B	PF	PA	PD	Pts	Qualification
1	Canberra Raiders	24	19	0	5	3	654	506	+148	44	Advance to finals series
2	Melbourne Storm	24	17	0	7	3	671	459	+212	40	Advance to finals series
3	Canterbury-Bankstown Bulldogs	24	16	0	8	3	534	414	+120	38	Advance to finals series
4	Brisbane Broncos (P)	24	15	0	9	3	680	508	+172	36	Advance to finals series
5	Cronulla-Sutherland Sharks	24	15	0	9	3	599	490	+109	36	Advance to finals series
6	New Zealand Warriors	24	14	0	10	3	517	496	+21	34	Advance to finals series
7	Penrith Panthers	24	13	1	10	3	576	469	+107	33	Advance to finals series
8	Sydney Roosters	24	13	0	11	3	653	521	+132	32	Advance to finals series
9	Dolphins	24	12	0	12	3	721	596	+125	30	
10	Manly Warringah Sea Eagles	24	12	0	12	3	555	534	+21	30	
11	Parramatta Eels	24	10	0	14	3	502	578	−76	26	
12	North Queensland Cowboys	24	9	1	14	3	538	684	−146	25	
13	Wests Tigers	24	9	0	15	3	477	612	−135	24	
14	South Sydney Rabbitohs	24	9	0	15	3	427	608	−181	24	
15	St. George Illawarra Dragons	24	8	0	16	3	498	628	−130	22	
16	Gold Coast Titans	24	6	0	18	3	520	719	−199	18	
17	Newcastle Knights	24	6	0	18	3	338	638	−300	18	

Source: National Rugby League
(P) Premiers

=== Ladder progression ===
- Numbers highlighted in green indicate that the team finished the round inside the top eight.
- Numbers highlighted in blue indicates the team finished first on the ladder in that round.
- Numbers highlighted in red indicates the team finished last place on the ladder in that round.
- Underlined numbers indicate that the team had a bye during that round.

	Team	1	2	3	4	5	6	7	8	9	10	11	12	13	14	15	16	17	18	19	20	21	22	23	24	25	26	27
1	Canberra Raiders	2	4	4	4	6	8	10	12	14	14	16	18	20	22	24	26	28	30	32	34	36	36	38	40	42	44	44
2	Melbourne Storm	2	4	6	6	8	10	10	12	12	14	14	16	18	20	22	24	26	28	30	30	32	34	36	38	40	40	40
3	Canterbury-Bankstown Bulldogs	2	4	6	8	10	12	14	14	16	18	20	20	22	24	26	28	28	28	30	32	34	34	36	36	36	38	38
4	Brisbane Broncos	2	2	4	6	8	8	8	10	10	10	10	12	12	14	16	18	20	22	24	26	26	28	28	30	32	34	36
5	Cronulla-Sutherland Sharks	0	2	4	4	4	6	8	8	10	12	14	14	16	16	18	18	18	20	22	24	26	28	28	30	32	34	36
6	New Zealand Warriors	0	2	4	6	8	8	10	12	14	16	18	18	20	22	24	24	24	26	28	30	30	30	30	32	34	34	34
7	Penrith Panthers	2	2	2	2	2	2	4	4	6	7	9	9	11	13	15	17	19	21	23	25	27	29	31	31	31	31	33
8	Sydney Roosters	0	2	2	2	2	4	4	6	8	10	10	12	12	14	16	18	20	20	22	22	22	24	26	28	28	30	32
9	Dolphins	0	0	0	0	2	4	6	6	6	8	8	10	12	14	16	16	18	20	20	22	24	26	26	26	26	28	30
10	Manly Warringah Sea Eagles	2	2	4	6	6	6	6	8	10	10	12	12	14	14	14	16	18	20	22	24	24	24	24	24	26	28	30
11	Parramatta Eels	0	0	0	0	2	2	4	6	6	6	8	10	10	10	12	14	14	16	16	16	18	18	20	20	22	24	26
12	North Queensland Cowboys	0	0	0	2	4	6	8	10	10	11	11	13	15	15	15	15	17	17	17	17	19	19	19	21	23	23	25
13	Wests Tigers	0	2	4	4	4	6	6	8	10	10	10	12	12	12	14	14	14	16	16	18	18	20	22	24	24	24	24
14	South Sydney Rabbitohs	2	4	4	6	8	8	8	8	8	10	12	14	14	14	14	14	14	14	16	16	16	16	18	20	22	24	24
15	St. George Illawarra Dragons	0	0	2	4	4	6	8	8	8	8	10	12	14	14	14	16	18	18	18	18	18	20	22	22	22	22	22
16	Gold Coast Titans	2	2	4	6	6	6	6	6	6	8	8	10	10	10	12	12	12	14	14	14	16	16	16	17	16	16	18
17	Newcastle Knights	2	4	4	6	6	6	6	6	8	8	8	10	10	12	12	14	14	16	16	16	16	18	18	18	18	18	18

== Finals series ==
Home	Score	Away	Match Information
Home	Score	Away	Date and time (AEST)	Venue	Referee	Attendance
Qualifying and elimination finals
Melbourne Storm	26–18	Canterbury-Bankstown Bulldogs	12 September, 19:50	AAMI Park	Adam Gee	22,117
New Zealand Warriors	8–24	Penrith Panthers	13 September, 16:05	Go Media Stadium	Grant Atkins	24,524
Cronulla-Sutherland Sharks	20–10	Sydney Roosters	13 September, 19:50	Sharks Stadium	Todd Smith	12,842
Canberra Raiders	28–29*	Brisbane Broncos	14 September, 16:05	GIO Stadium	Ashley Klein	25,523
Semi-finals
Canberra Raiders	12–32	Cronulla-Sutherland Sharks	20 September, 19:50	GIO Stadium	Grant Atkins	24,322
Canterbury-Bankstown Bulldogs	26–46	Penrith Panthers	21 September, 16:05	Accor Stadium	Ashley Klein	56,872
Preliminary finals
Melbourne Storm	22–14	Cronulla-Sutherland Sharks	26 September, 19:50	AAMI Park	Ashley Klein	29,233
Brisbane Broncos	16–14	Penrith Panthers	28 September, 16:05	Suncorp Stadium	Grant Atkins	52,491

* Match decided in golden point extra time.

=== Bracket ===
Qualifying and elimination finals
14 September – Canberra
1	Canberra	28
4	Brisbane	29
13 September – Sydney
5	Cronulla-Sutherland	20
8	Sydney	10
13 September – Auckland
6	New Zealand	8
7	Penrith	24
12 September – Melbourne
2	Melbourne	26
3	Canterbury-Bankstown	18

Semi-finals
20 September – Canberra
Canberra	12
Cronulla-Sutherland	32
21 September – Sydney
Canterbury-Bankstown	26
Penrith	46

Preliminary finals
28 September – Brisbane
Brisbane	16
Penrith	14
26 September – Melbourne
Melbourne	22
Cronulla-Sutherland	14

Grand final
5 October – Sydney
Melbourne	22
Brisbane	26

== Grand final ==
2025 NRL Grand Final

Sunday, 5 October
19:30 AEDT (UTC+11)

Melbourne Storm	22 – 26	Brisbane Broncos
Tries: 4 Meaney 8'; Katoa 14'; Warbrick 22'; Hughes 35'; Goals: 3 Meaney 9', 16', 37' (3/4); Sin bin: Loiero (yellow card) 78' to 80'	1st: 22–12; 2nd: 0–14; Report	Tries: 5 Mariner 3', 55'; Shibasaki 46', 58'; Walsh 31'; Goals: 3 Reynolds 4', 32' (2/3); Walsh 59' (1/2)

Accor Stadium, Sydney
Attendance: 80,223
Referee: Grant Atkins
Video referee: Ashley Klein
Touch judges: Chris Sutton, David Munro
Clive Churchill Medal: Reece Walsh (Brisbane)

== Player statistics and records ==
- In Round 7, Nathan Cleary surpassed Ryan Girdler as the highest scoring Penrith Panthers player of all time.
- In Round 13, Alex Johnston became the first player in the NRL era (1998–present), and second of all time, to score 200 career tries.
- In Round 14, Kayal Iro became the first player in the NRL era to score a try in each of their first nine games of a season.
- In Round 14, Josh Papali'i surpassed Jason Croker as the most capped Canberra Raiders player of all time.
- In Round 27, James Fisher-Harris scored a try in the first 9 seconds of a match, the fastest in NRL history.
- No player was sent off throughout the entire season for the first time since 2017.

The following statistics are as of the conclusion of the finals series.

Top 5 point scorers

Points	Player	Club	Tries	Goals	Field goals
278	Jamayne Isaako	Dolphins	11	117	0
228	Nicho Hynes	Cronulla-Sutherland Sharks	8	98	0
192	Jamal Fogarty	Canberra Raiders	2	92	0
184	Scott Drinkwater	North Queensland Cowboys	11	70	0
184	Nathan Cleary	Penrith Panthers	6	79	1

Top 5 try scorers

Tries	Player	Club
24	Mark Nawaqanitawase	Sydney Roosters
22	Hamiso Tabuai-Fidow	Dolphins
20	Xavier Coates	Melbourne Storm
19	Josh Addo-Carr	Parramatta Eels
19	Daniel Tupou	Sydney Roosters

Top 5 goal kickers

Goals	Player	Club
117	Jamayne Isaako	Dolphins
98	Nicho Hynes	Cronulla-Sutherland Sharks
92	Jamal Fogarty	Canberra Raiders
81	Adam Reynolds	Brisbane Broncos
79	Nathan Cleary	Penrith Panthers

Top 5 tacklers

Tackles	Player	Club
1,220	Blayke Brailey	Cronulla-Sutherland Sharks
1,023	Terrell May	Wests Tigers
1,018	Damien Cook	St. George Illawarra Dragons
987	Mitch Kenny	Penrith Panthers
949	Reed Mahoney	Canterbury-Bankstown Bulldogs

== Team of the Year ==
=== Dally M Team of the Year ===
Announced on the evening of 1 October 2025.

Jersey	Position	Player
1	Fullback	James Tedesco
2	Wing	Mark Nawaqanitawase
3	Centre	Kotoni Staggs
4	Centre	Stephen Crichton
5	Wing	Xavier Coates
6	Five-eighth	Ethan Strange
7	Halfback	Nathan Cleary
8	Prop	Addin Fonua-Blake
9	Hooker	Blayke Brailey
10	Prop	Payne Haas
11	Second-row	Eliesa Katoa
12	Second-row	Hudson Young
13	Lock	Erin Clark

=== Players' Dream Team ===
The Rugby League Players Association announced the 2025 Players' Dream team on 22 September 2025.

Jersey	Position	Player
1	Fullback	James Tedesco
2	Wing	Mark Nawaqanitawase
3	Centre	Herbie Farnworth
4	Centre	Stephen Crichton
5	Wing	Xavier Coates
6	Five-eighth	Ethan Strange
7	Halfback	Isaiya Katoa
8	Prop	Joseph Tapine
9	Hooker	Harry Grant
10	Prop	Payne Haas
11	Second-row	Eliesa Katoa
12	Second-row	Hudson Young
13	Lock	Erin Clark
14	Impact	Kurt Mann

== Weekly awards ==
After each round, the NRL announces via social media two weekly awards. The player with the most fantasy points each round is announced through the NRL Fantasy social media account.

Round	Most Fantasy Points		Try of the Week		Tackle of the Week	Ref
Round	Player	Points	Try-scorer	Assisting Players	Tackle of the Week	Ref
Sponsor	Hisense		Drinkwise		youi	
1	Payne Haas	81	Ben Hunt	Passed by multiple players across the field, last pass by Jesse Arthars	Stephen Crichton	
2	Connor Watson	90	Daly Cherry-Evans	Chip kick from Jason Saab tapped back into play from past the dead ball line by Reuben Garrick	Daniel Tupou	
3	Payne Haas	106	Payne Haas	Solo run from 31m out, breaking the line of three defenders	Moeaki Fotuaika	
4	Terrell May	85	Leka Halasima	Run 70m down the sideline and beating two defenders	Brendan Piakura	
5	Joseph Tapine	86	Sebastian Kris	Passed by multiple players across the field, last pass by Simi Sasagi	Coen Hess	
6	David Fifita	92	William Kennedy	Run from an offload 20m out, evading six defenders to score	Luke Metcalf	
7	Nathan Cleary	93	Ray Stone	Behind-the-back flick pass from Kodi Nikorima	Chanel Harris-Tavita	
8	Beau Fermor	109	Jake Averillo	First kick by Jamayne Isaako, second kick by Kodi Nikorima	Jaylan De Groot	
9	Jacob Kiraz	102	Kaeo Weekes	Chip-and-chase 38m out	Corey Allan	
10	Ryan Papenhuyzen	100	Ryan Papenhuyzen	Passed by multiple players across the field, including three total kick chases	Ethan Strange	
11	Terrell May	109	Mark Nawaqanitawase	Solo one-footed chip kick dragged back into try zone	Campbell Graham	
12	Fletcher Sharpe	98	Hugo Savala	Linebreak by Dominic Young to James Tedesco, who flick passes behind the back	Thomas Jenkins	
13	Keaon Koloamatangi	85	Leka Halasima	Multiple offloads, evading four players	Hudson Young	
14	Thomas Jenkins	96	Josh Papali'i	Crash play in milestone game	Marcelo Montoya	
15	Jack Bostock	103	Salesi Foketi	Received offload from James Tedesco, stepping a defender and running 47m to score	Jacob Preston	
16	Payne Haas	102	Mark Nawaqanitawase	Flicked back into play from the sideline by Hugo Savala, evading two defenders to score in the corner	Joseph Tapine	
17	Tallis Duncan	96	Nathan Cleary	Solo charge down	Connor Tracey	
18	Kaeo Weekes	96	Kaeo Weekes	Solo full-field run, breaking the tackles of six defenders	Latu Fainu	
19	Nicho Hynes	93	Dominic Young	Solo chip-and-chase from 20m out	Gehamat Shibasaki	
20	Dylan Edwards	101	Leka Halasima	Recovered a charged down field goal attempt, running through multiple defenders from 45m out	Lehi Hopoate	
21	Tom Dearden	93	Sean Russell	Regained off a Mitchell Moses bomb kick, chip-and-chase from 15m out	Lehi Hopoate	
22	Jayden Campbell	103	Angus Crichton	Multiple offloads and a kick from Sam Walker, evading four players	Taine Tuaupiki	
23	James Tedesco	96	Hugo Savala	Recovered flick pass that almost went into touch, multiple offloads, last pass by James Tedesco	Selwyn Cobbo	
24	Scott Drinkwater	102	Harry Grant	Solo scoot from dummy half	Jye Gray	
25	Lehi Hopoate	94	Kaeo Weekes	Full-length run after a failed field goal attempt, last pass by Ethan Strange	Scott Drinkwater	
26	Daly Cherry-Evans	92	Josh Addo-Carr	Solo run from 110m out	Daine Laurie	
27	Nathan Cleary	115	James Fisher-Harris	Nine-second try off the kick-off left by multiple defenders	Reece Walsh	
FW1	Payne Haas	91	Not announced			
FW2	Paul Alamoti	100	Not announced			
FW3	Paul Alamoti	86	Not announced			
GF	Reece Walsh	105	Not announced			

== Attendances ==
=== Club figures ===
Team	Games	Total	2025 Average	2024 Average	Difference	Highest	Lowest
Brisbane Broncos	12	494,223	41,185	39,873	+1,312	45,317	38,016
Canberra Raiders	12	229,632	19,136	13,958	+5,178	45,209	9,650
Canterbury-Bankstown Bulldogs	12	368,258	30,688	20,848	+9,840	65,305	10,412
Cronulla-Sutherland Sharks	11*	141,411	12,856	11,435	+1,421	31,347	6,321
Dolphins	12	261,841	21,820	21,626	+194	44,278	10,023
Gold Coast Titans	11*	180,505	16,410	16,241	+169	24,553	13,167
Manly Warringah Sea Eagles	12	196,719	16,393	18,679	-2,286	17,375	12,478
Melbourne Storm	11*	238,446	21,677	19,849	+1,828	26,427	17,376
Newcastle Knights	12	250,695	20,891	22,635	-1,744	25,960	15,193
New Zealand Warriors	11*	255,071	23,188	23,166	+22	26,512	17,095
North Queensland Cowboys	12	223,786	18,649	19,281	-632	22,903	15,897
Parramatta Eels	12	190,848	15,904	18,192	-2,288	24,059	8,074
Penrith Panthers	11*	183,646	16,695	18,873	-2,178	45,209	9,925
South Sydney Rabbitohs	11*	176,770	16,070	14,672	+1,398	31,347	6,738
St. George Illawarra Dragons	12	150,059	12,505	15,036	-2,531	18,191	6,211
Sydney Roosters	11*	261,791	23,799	23,364	+435	41,604	13,399
Wests Tigers	11*	166,939	15,176	12,421	+2,755	26,145	9,328

* = Magic Round home game not counted

=== Top regular season crowds ===
Rank	Home team	Away team	Crowd	Venue	City	Round
1	Canterbury-Bankstown Bulldogs	South Sydney Rabbitohs	65,305	Accor Stadium	Sydney	7
2	Canterbury-Bankstown Bulldogs	Parramatta Eels	59,878	Accor Stadium	Sydney	14
3	Brisbane Broncos	North Queensland Cowboys	45,317	Suncorp Stadium	Brisbane	3
4	Canberra Raiders	New Zealand Warriors	45,209	Allegiant Stadium	Paradise	1
4	Penrith Panthers	Cronulla-Sutherland Sharks	45,209	Allegiant Stadium	Paradise	1
5	Brisbane Broncos	Dolphins	44,350	Suncorp Stadium	Brisbane	24
6	Dolphins	Brisbane Broncos	44,278	Suncorp Stadium	Brisbane	4
7	Brisbane Broncos	New Zealand Warriors	43,424	Suncorp Stadium	Brisbane	17
8	Sydney Roosters	South Sydney Rabbitohs	41,604	Allianz Stadium	Sydney	27
9	Brisbane Broncos	Melbourne Storm	41,185	Suncorp Stadium	Brisbane	27
10	Sydney Roosters	St. George Illawarra Dragons	41,021	Allianz Stadium	Sydney	8
11	Brisbane Broncos	Wests Tigers	41,011	Suncorp Stadium	Brisbane	5
12	Brisbane Broncos	Sydney Roosters	40,814	Suncorp Stadium	Brisbane	6
13	Brisbane Broncos	Canterbury-Bankstown Bulldogs	40,233	Suncorp Stadium	Brisbane	8
14	Brisbane Broncos	Gold Coast Titans	39,884	Suncorp Stadium	Brisbane	14
15	Brisbane Broncos	Parramatta Eels	39,057	Suncorp Stadium	Brisbane	21
16	Brisbane Broncos	Cronulla-Sutherland Sharks	39,042	Suncorp Stadium	Brisbane	16
17	Brisbane Broncos	South Sydney Rabbitohs	38,430	Suncorp Stadium	Brisbane	22
18	Brisbane Broncos	St. George Illawarra Dragons	38,016	Suncorp Stadium	Brisbane	11
19	Dolphins	New Zealand Warriors	32,165	Suncorp Stadium	Brisbane	11
20	Sydney Roosters	Canterbury-Bankstown Bulldogs	31,399	Allianz Stadium	Sydney	24
21	Cronulla-Sutherland Sharks	Manly Warringah Sea Eagles	31,347	Optus Stadium	Perth	6
21	South Sydney Rabbitohs	North Queensland Cowboys	31,347	Optus Stadium	Perth	6
22	Canterbury-Bankstown Bulldogs	Cronulla-Sutherland Sharks	30,368	Accor Stadium	Sydney	27
23	Canterbury-Bankstown Bulldogs	Sydney Roosters	30,166	Accor Stadium	Sydney	11
24	Canterbury-Bankstown Bulldogs	St. George Illawarra Dragons	30,115	Accor Stadium	Sydney	20
25	Dolphins	Melbourne Storm	28,024	Suncorp Stadium	Brisbane	7

- The Canterbury-Bankstown Bulldogs Round 7 game at Accor Stadium set a new record for the highest regular season attendance (excluding double-headers) in the NRL, surpassing the record set by the South Sydney Rabbitohs in 2013. In Round 14, the Bulldogs surpassed the Rabbitohs former 2013 crowd record again, posting the two highest regular season single game crowds of all time in a single season.

=== Magic Round (Round 9) ===
Home team	Away team	Date	Time	Venue	Match Figure	Day Total
Cronulla-Sutherland Sharks	Parramatta Eels	Friday, 2 May	6:00 pm	Suncorp Stadium	44,613	48,359
Sydney Roosters	Dolphins	Friday, 2 May	8:05 pm	Suncorp Stadium	48,359	48,359
South Sydney Rabbitohs	Newcastle Knights	Saturday, 3 May	3:00 pm	Suncorp Stadium	39,682	50,658
New Zealand Warriors	North Queensland Cowboys	Saturday, 3 May	5:30 pm	Suncorp Stadium	49,512	50,658
Wests Tigers	St. George Illawarra Dragons	Saturday, 3 May	7:45 pm	Suncorp Stadium	50,658	50,658
Gold Coast Titans	Canterbury-Bankstown Bulldogs	Sunday, 4 May	1:50 pm	Suncorp Stadium	39,581	50,309
Penrith Panthers	Brisbane Broncos	Sunday, 4 May	4:05 pm	Suncorp Stadium	50,309	50,309
Melbourne Storm	Canberra Raiders	Sunday, 4 May	6:25 pm	Suncorp Stadium	49,057	50,309
Bye: Manly Warringah Sea Eagles

=== Finals ===
Rank	Home team	Away team	Crowd	Venue	City
1	Melbourne Storm	Brisbane Broncos	80,223	Accor Stadium	Sydney
2	Canterbury-Bankstown Bulldogs	Penrith Panthers	56,872	Accor Stadium	Sydney
3	Brisbane Broncos	Penrith Panthers	52,491	Suncorp Stadium	Brisbane
4	Melbourne Storm	Cronulla-Sutherland Sharks	29,233	AAMI Park	Melbourne
5	Canberra Raiders	Brisbane Broncos	25,523	GIO Stadium	Canberra
6	New Zealand Warriors	Penrith Panthers	24,524	Go Media Stadium	Auckland
7	Canberra Raiders	Cronulla-Sutherland Sharks	24,322	GIO Stadium	Canberra
8	Melbourne Storm	Canterbury-Bankstown Bulldogs	22,117	AAMI Park	Melbourne
9	Cronulla-Sutherland Sharks	Sydney Roosters	12,842	Sharks Stadium	Sydney

== Match officials ==
- Includes Finals matches

Referee	Games
Grant Atkins	30
Todd Smith	27
Adam Gee	26
Peter Gough	26
Gerard Sutton	26
Ashley Klein	24
Wyatt Raymond	24
Liam Kennedy	13
Belinda Sharpe	5
Chris Butler	5
Jarrod Cole	3
Ziggy Przeklasa-Adamski	2

== 2025 transfers ==
Player	2024 Club	2025 Club
Jordan Pereira	Brisbane Broncos	Retirement
Corey Oates	Brisbane Broncos	Retirement
Tristan Sailor	Brisbane Broncos	St Helens (Super League)
Nick Cotric	Canberra Raiders	Catalans Dragons (Super League)
Emre Guler	Canberra Raiders	St. George Illawarra Dragons
Jordan Rapana	Canberra Raiders	Hull F.C. (Super League)
Elliott Whitehead	Canberra Raiders	Catalans Dragons (Super League)
Zac Woolford	Canberra Raiders	Huddersfield Giants (Super League)
Josh Addo-Carr	Canterbury-Bankstown Bulldogs	Parramatta Eels
Poasa Faamausili	Canterbury-Bankstown Bulldogs	Retirement
Liam Knight	Canterbury-Bankstown Bulldogs	Hull F.C. (Super League)
Chris Patolo	Canterbury-Bankstown Bulldogs	Manly Warringah Sea Eagles
Hayze Perham	Canterbury-Bankstown Bulldogs	Brisbane Broncos
Jeral Skelton	Canterbury-Bankstown Bulldogs	Wests Tigers
Zane Tetevano	Canterbury-Bankstown Bulldogs	Retirement
Dale Finucane	Cronulla-Sutherland Sharks	Retirement
Royce Hunt	Cronulla-Sutherland Sharks	Wests Tigers
Jack Williams	Cronulla-Sutherland Sharks	Parramatta Eels
Euan Aitken	Dolphins	South Sydney Rabbitohs
Jesse Bromwich	Dolphins	Retirement
Edrick Lee	Dolphins	Retirement
Anthony Milford	Dolphins	Souths Logan Magpies (Hostplus Cup)
Tesi Niu	Dolphins	Leigh Leopards (Super League)
Tevita Pangai Junior	Dolphins	Catalans Dragons (Super League)
Tanah Boyd	Gold Coast Titans	New Zealand Warriors
Erin Clark	Gold Coast Titans	New Zealand Warriors
Isaac Liu	Gold Coast Titans	Leigh Leopards (Super League)
Keenan Palasia	Gold Coast Titans	Leeds Rhinos (Super League)
Joe Stimson	Gold Coast Titans	Brisbane Tigers (Hostplus Cup)
Ben Condon	Manly Warringah Sea Eagles	Leigh Leopards (Super League)
Karl Lawton	Manly Warringah Sea Eagles	North Queensland Cowboys
Brad Parker	Manly Warringah Sea Eagles	Retirement
Jaxson Paulo	Manly Warringah Sea Eagles	North Queensland Cowboys
Josh Schuster	Manly Warringah Sea Eagles	South Sydney Rabbitohs
Aaron Woods	Manly Warringah Sea Eagles	Retirement
Chris Lewis	Melbourne Storm	Retirement
Tepai Moeroa	Melbourne Storm	Retirement
Young Tonumaipea	Melbourne Storm	Retirement
Christian Welch	Melbourne Storm	Retirement
Jed Cartwright	Newcastle Knights	Hull F.C. (Super League)
Daniel Saifiti	Newcastle Knights	Dolphins
Enari Tuala	Newcastle Knights	Canterbury-Bankstown Bulldogs
Addin Fonua-Blake	New Zealand Warriors	Cronulla-Sutherland Sharks
Tohu Harris	New Zealand Warriors	Retirement
Shaun Johnson	New Zealand Warriors	Retirement
Marcelo Montoya	New Zealand Warriors	Canterbury-Bankstown Bulldogs
Jazz Tevaga	New Zealand Warriors	Manly Warringah Sea Eagles
Kyle Feldt	North Queensland Cowboys	St Helens (Super League)
Kulikefu Finefeuiaki	North Queensland Cowboys	Dolphins
Jake Granville	North Queensland Cowboys	Retirement
Valentine Holmes	North Queensland Cowboys	St. George Illawarra Dragons
Jamayne Taunoa-Brown	North Queensland Cowboys	Retirement
Chad Townsend	North Queensland Cowboys	Sydney Roosters
Daejarn Asi	Parramatta Eels	Castleford Tigers (Super League)
Reagan Campbell-Gillard	Parramatta Eels	Gold Coast Titans
Clinton Gutherson	Parramatta Eels	St. George Illawarra Dragons
Morgan Harper	Parramatta Eels	New Zealand Warriors
Makahesi Makatoa	Parramatta Eels	Sydney Roosters
Ofahiki Ogden	Parramatta Eels	North Sydney Bears (NSW Cup)
Maika Sivo	Parramatta Eels	Leeds Rhinos (Super League)
Blaize Talagi	Parramatta Eels	Penrith Panthers
James Fisher-Harris	Penrith Panthers	New Zealand Warriors
Jarome Luai	Penrith Panthers	Wests Tigers
Taylan May	Penrith Panthers	Wests Tigers
Tyrone Peachey	Penrith Panthers	Retirement
Sunia Turuva	Penrith Panthers	Wests Tigers
Tom Burgess	South Sydney Rabbitohs	Huddersfield Giants (Super League)
Michael Chee-Kam	South Sydney Rabbitohs	Manly Warringah Sea Eagles
Damien Cook	South Sydney Rabbitohs	St. George Illawarra Dragons
Jacob Gagai	South Sydney Rabbitohs	Huddersfield Giants (Super League)
Lachlan Ilias	South Sydney Rabbitohs	St. George Illawarra Dragons
Richard Kennar	South Sydney Rabbitohs	Retirement
Taane Milne	South Sydney Rabbitohs	Huddersfield Giants (Super League)
Gehamat Shibasaki	South Sydney Rabbitohs	Brisbane Broncos
Jack Bird	St. George Illawarra Dragons	Wests Tigers
Fa'amanu Brown	St. George Illawarra Dragons	Retirement
Max Feagai	St. George Illawarra Dragons	Dolphins
Ben Hunt	St. George Illawarra Dragons	Brisbane Broncos
Zac Lomax	St. George Illawarra Dragons	Parramatta Eels
Michael Jennings	Sydney Roosters	Retirement
Luke Keary	Sydney Roosters	Catalans Dragons (Super League)
Joseph Manu	Sydney Roosters	Toyota Verblitz (Japan Rugby League One)
Terrell May	Sydney Roosters	Wests Tigers
Dylan Napa	Sydney Roosters	Retirement
Joseph Sua'ali'i	Sydney Roosters	New South Wales Waratahs (Super Rugby)
Sitili Tupouniua	Sydney Roosters	Canterbury-Bankstown Bulldogs
Jared Waerea-Hargreaves	Sydney Roosters	Hull Kingston Rovers (Super League)
Solomon Alaimalo	Wests Tigers	Moana Pasifika (Super Rugby)
John Bateman	Wests Tigers	North Queensland Cowboys
Justin Olam	Wests Tigers	Retirement
Isaiah Papali'i	Wests Tigers	Penrith Panthers
Aidan Sezer	Wests Tigers	Hull F.C. (Super League)
Junior Tupou	Wests Tigers	Dolphins
Stefano Utoikamanu	Wests Tigers	Melbourne Storm
Sio Siua Taukeiaho	Catalans Dragons (Super League)	Manly Warringah Sea Eagles
Tom Amone	Leigh Leopards (Super League)	Canterbury-Bankstown Bulldogs
Kai O'Donnell	Leigh Leopards (Super League)	North Queensland Cowboys
Lewis Dodd	St Helens (Super League)	South Sydney Rabbitohs
Matty Nicholson	Warrington Wolves (Super League)	Canberra Raiders
Tyrone Thompson	Chiefs (Super Rugby)	Newcastle Knights
Taj Annan	Queensland Reds (Super Rugby)	Newcastle Knights
Moses Leo	North Harbour (National Provincial Championship)	Melbourne Storm
Nathan Lawson	Australia (Rugby sevens)	St. George Illawarra Dragons

=== Mid-season transfers ===
Player	Original Club	New Club	Date of transfer
David Klemmer	Wests Tigers	St. George Illawarra Dragons	14 March
Ryan Sutton	Canterbury-Bankstown Bulldogs	Gold Coast Titans	18 March
Dylan Walker	New Zealand Warriors	Parramatta Eels	26 March
Francis Molo	St. George Illawarra Dragons	Dolphins	27 March
Will Pryce	Newcastle Knights	Hull F.C. (Super League)	31 March
Tom Amone	Canterbury-Bankstown Bulldogs	Castleford Tigers (Super League)	14 April
Joe Ofahengaue	Parramatta Eels	Leigh Leopards (Super League)	17 April
Brandon Smith	Sydney Roosters	South Sydney Rabbitohs	13 May
Josiah Pahulu	Gold Coast Titans	Melbourne Storm	26 May
Lachlan Galvin	Wests Tigers	Canterbury-Bankstown Bulldogs	30 May
Dominic Young	Sydney Roosters	Newcastle Knights	16 June
Bryce Cartwright	Parramatta Eels	St Marys Saints (Ron Massey Cup)	17 June
Junior Tupou	Dolphins	Sydney Roosters	28 June
Jake Arthur	Manly Warringah Sea Eagles	Newcastle Knights	29 June
Tallyn Da Silva	Wests Tigers	Parramatta Eels	29 June

=== Loan moves ===
Player	Home club	→ Loan club	Dates	Pld	Ref
Jayden Sullivan	Wests Tigers	South Sydney Rabbitohs	Full season	13	
Mikaele Ravalawa	St. George Illawarra Dragons	South Sydney Rabbitohs	14 March – 5 October (Round 2 – end of season)	3	
Ryan Matterson	Parramatta Eels	Warrington Wolves (Super League)	22 July – 11 October (Round 21 – end of season)	8	
Brendan Hands	Parramatta Eels	Toulouse Olympique (RFL Championship)	30 July – 11 October (Round 22 – end of season)	6	

=== Coaches ===
Coach	2024 Club	2025 Club
Kevin Walters	Brisbane Broncos	Australia
Wayne Bennett	Dolphins	South Sydney Rabbitohs
Jason Ryles	Melbourne Storm (assistant)	Parramatta Eels
Michael Maguire	New South Wales	Brisbane Broncos
