= Shane Flanagan =

Australian rugby league coach (born 1965)

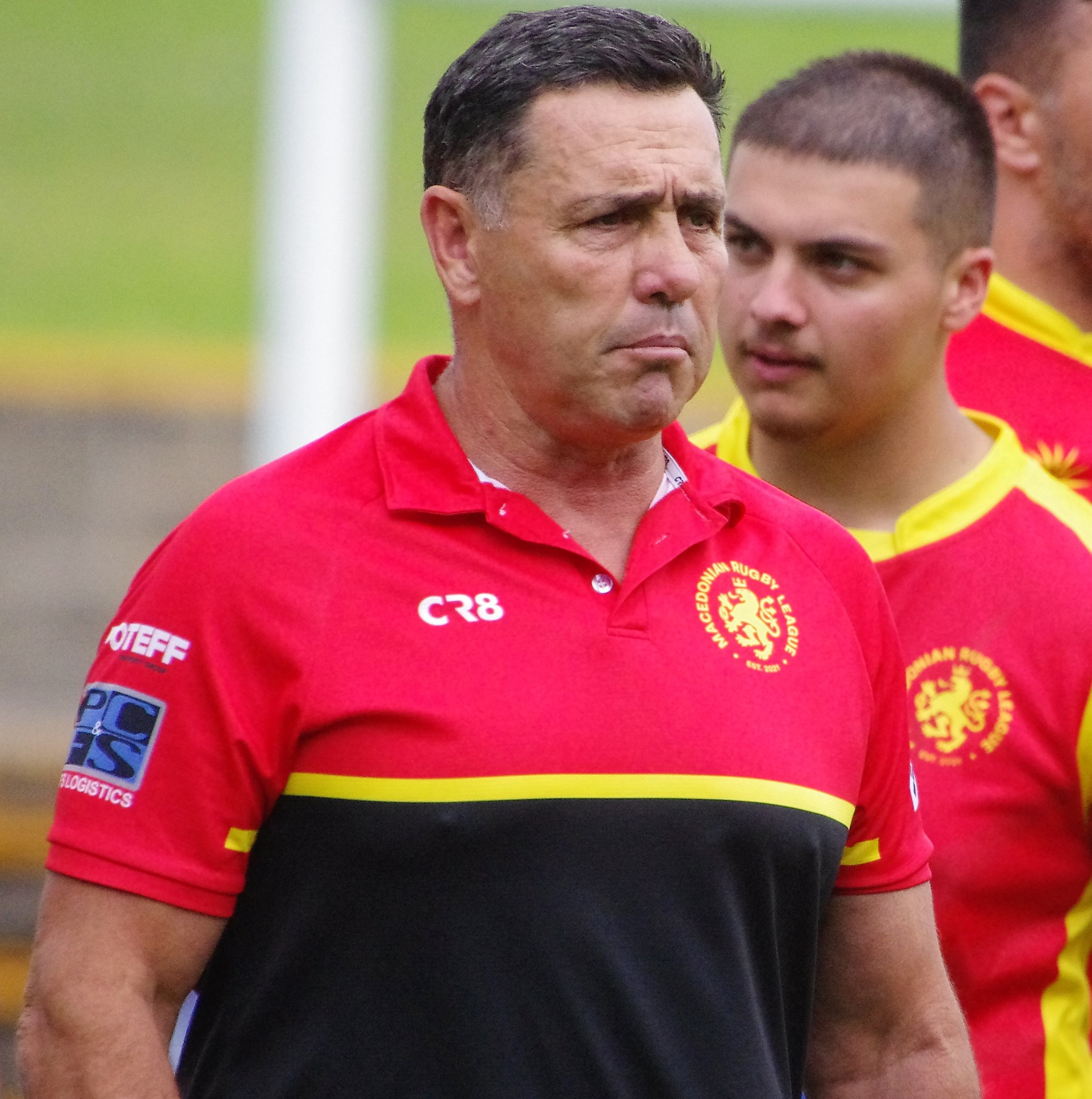

Personal information
- Full name: Shane Flanagan
- Born: 2 December 1965 (age 60) Sydney, New South Wales, Australia

Playing information
- Position: Hooker
Club
Years	Team	Pld	T	G	FG	P
1987	St. George Dragons	3	0	0	0	0
1989–91	Western Suburbs	42	2	0	0	8
1992–94	Parramatta Eels	33	1	0	0	4
	Total	78	3	0	0	12

Coaching information
Club
Years	Team	Gms	W	D	L	W%
2010–13	Cronulla Sharks	80	35	1	44	44
2015–18	Cronulla Sharks	105	67	1	37	64
2024–26	St. George Illawarra	55	19	0	36	35
	Total	240	121	2	117	50
Representative
Years	Team	Gms	W	D	L	W%
2021	North Macedonia
- Source: As of 21 April 2026
- Relatives: Kyle Flanagan (son)

Shane Flanagan (born 2 December 1965) is an Australian professional rugby league football coach and commentator. Flanagan previously was the head coach of the Cronulla-Sutherland Sharks, and also the St George Illawarra Dragons in the National Rugby League. Flanagan was appointed as the head coach of the Sharks when former coach Ricky Stuart resigned on 20 July 2010, and was best known for guiding Cronulla to their first premiership in 2016. He is the father of current Dragons player Kyle Flanagan.

== Playing career ==
Flanagan played S. G. Ball Cup, Jersey Flegg Cup, and President's Cup for St. George Dragons prior to making his first-grade debut for the club in 1987. He came off the bench in this game, a round 11 match against the Western Suburbs Magpies, and played his second game against the same opposition in round 24, also off the bench. He was the starting hooker in the following week’s match against Parramatta. After making these three first-grade appearances in 1987, he made none in 1988.

In 1989, Flanagan joined the Western Suburbs Magpies. In his second game for them, he accused his Brisbane Broncos opponent Andrew Gee of biting, showing the referee a mark on his forearm. The Magpies’ CEO later decided not to take any action against Gee. In round 8, Flanagan scored his first top-grade try in a tight victory over St. George at Kogarah Oval. He scored his second and final try of the year in round 16, darting over from dummy-half.

After being a regular starter at hooker in 1989 and 1990, he played only five games in 1991 under new coach Warren Ryan, with Ryan preferring new recruit Joe Thomas in the hooking role. His last game for the Magpies was a winning play-off for fifth spot, which allowed the Magpies to make their first semi-finals appearance since 1982.

He moved to Parramatta Eels in 1992 and remained with the club until 1994, when he retired from playing football following a knee injury. Flanagan was later engaged to coach the Parramatta S.G. Ball team in 1997.

== Coaching career ==
After spending the 1997 season in the English Super League as Stuart Raper's assistant at the Castleford Tigers, Flanagan returned to Australia and was eventually appointed to an assistant coaching role at the Sydney Roosters for two years under Ricky Stuart. He went on to coach the Australian Schoolboys side, was an assistant coach for Australia under Stuart in 2007, and was an assistant coach under Craig Bellamy for New South Wales from 2008 to 2010.

In July 2010, Flanagan was instated as Cronulla-Sutherland head coach following Ricky Stuart's resignation with six weeks remaining in the 2010 season.

As head coach of the Cronulla-Sutherland Sharks, Flanagan lost his first three games mostly by small margins before a breakthrough win came against premiership contenders the Sydney Roosters in round 23 of the 2010 season. The Sharks won 18–12. The Sharks won one more game in the 2010 season, against the Gold Coast Titans.

In the 2012 NRL season, Flanagan coached Cronulla to finish 7th on the ladder. Flanagan built a reputation for signing key players to the club. Having signed Todd Carney the previous year, Flanagan secured the purchases of Beau Ryan and Chris Heighington from the West Tigers, Michael Gordon and Luke Lewis from the Panthers, and Jonathon Wright from the Bulldogs.

In December 2013, following a year-long investigation into the Sharks' supplements program carried out during the 2011 NRL season, Flanagan was suspended from his role for a period of 12 months. As a result, Flanagan was forced to sit out the entire 2014 NRL season, the year in which the Sharks finished last on the ladder.

In the 2016 NRL season, he guided Cronulla to a top-four finish. They travelled to Canberra in the first week of the finals and record a 16–14 victory thus earning a preliminary final at Allianz Stadium. The Cronulla-Sutherland Sharks won against the 2015 premiers, the North Queensland Cowboys, by 32-20 thus earning a place in the 2016 Grand Final. On 2 October, the Cronulla-Sutherland Sharks recorded a 14–12 victory over the Melbourne Storm, making Flanagan their first coach to win a premiership.

In the 2017 NRL season, he guided Cronulla to the finals. In week one, Cronulla played against North Queensland in the elimination final, losing 15–14 in an upset.

In 2018, Flanagan took Cronulla to a top-four finish. Cronulla lost their week one final match against Sydney Roosters before defeating Penrith the following week 21–20. In the preliminary final, Cronulla was defeated by Melbourne 22–6.

On 19 December 2018, Flanagan was de-registered as a coach indefinitely for failing to adhere to the conditions of his suspension in 2014. The NRL integrity unit had found that Flanagan had sent more than fifty emails exchanged between Flanagan, club management, and the football department which was strictly against the conditions of his suspension which included that Flanagan was to have no contact or involvement with the club during his ban. The NRL also fined Cronulla $800,000 as punishment.

On 20 September 2019, it was announced that Flanagan was allowed to return to the NRL but under strict conditions. He was still unable to hold a head coaching role at any club until 2022 but was allowed to return as an assistant coach. He joined his junior club the St. George Illawarra Dragons as an assistant coach to Paul McGregor beginning in the 2020 NRL season. Flanagan's role was specifically focused on defence. Flanagan was the most important of one of 8 coaching changes at the Dragons following a dismal 2019.

In September 2020, Flanagan was told his services would not be required in 2021 by St. George after the appointment of new head coach Anthony Griffin. On 24 February 2022, it was announced that Flanagan would return to St. George Illawarra, this time as a List Management Consultant. In October 2022, Flanagan joined the Manly Warringah Sea Eagles as an assistant coach to Anthony Seibold ahead of the 2023 NRL season.

On 14 June 2023, Flanagan signed a three-year contract to become the head coach of the St. George Illawarra Dragons starting in 2024. In round 1 of the 2024 NRL season, Flanagan's reign at St. George Illawarra got off to the best possible start as the club recorded an upset 28-4 victory over the Gold Coast. In Flanagan's first year in charge of the Dragons, he took the club to an 11th placed finish just two points outside the finals places. This is in spite of predictions that the Dragons would get the wooden spoon in 2024. The club did have the chance to qualify for the finals but lost their last two matches of the season.

On 8 August 2025, Flanagan signed a contract extension with St. George Illawarra keeping him at the club until the end of 2028. Flanagan guided St. George Illawarra to a 15th placed finish in the 2025 NRL season recording only eight wins for the year.

To start the 2026 NRL season, St. George Illawarra lost their opening three matches which placed Flanagan's position as head coach under scrutiny. Flanagan responded to the media following the clubs round 3 loss against Parramatta comparing Cronulla's 2016 situation to St. George Illawarra's stating "“But you know, I look back and this is not a similar team, but I think I lost three in-a-row in 2016 and we won 15 in-a-row, So don’t worry, certain sides are going to lose three in-a-row during the year. Unfortunately, we’ve lost three at the start"

Before the start of the 2026 NRL season, Flanagan reportedly told Channel Nine's Danny Weidler that the side "aren't gonna win the comp this year" just days out from the first game. Flanagan later said of the comment "I'd love to say that we're good enough to go with the big dogs this year. We'll win a lot of footy games this year, but I'm just realistic - don't set stupid expectations". The club lost their opening six games to start the 2026 season which was the worst start to a year by St. George Illawarra including the histories of St. George and Illawarra as separate clubs.

On 20 April, Flanagan was removed as head coach after the club lost their opening seven matches. St. George Illawarra chairman Andrew Lancaster said that "Our results and our performance on the field … is not to our expectation".

== Post coaching ==
Flanagan was a commentator for Fox Sports Australia and 2GB between 2021–2023.

Following his departure as Head Coach of the St. George Illawarra Dragons, in May 2026, Flanagan joined Triple M's NRL broadcast and commentary team. In September 2026, it was announced that Flanagan would be part of the Seven Network's 2026 Rugby League World Cup commentary team.
