= Hopoate =

Hopoate is a Tongan surname. Notable people with this surname include:

- John Hopoate (born 1974), Australian rugby league player and boxer
- Albert Hopoate (rugby league, born 1985), Australian rugby league player, younger brother of John
- William Hopoate (born 1992), Australian rugby league player, son of John
- Jamil Hopoate (born 1994), Australian rugby league player and convicted criminal, son of John
- Albert Hopoate (rugby league, born 2001), Australian rugby league player, son of John
- Lehi Hopoate (born 2005), Australian rugby league player, son of John
