= Albert Hopoate =

Albert Hopoate may refer to:

- Albert Hopoate (rugby league, born 1985), Australian rugby league player
- Albert Hopoate (rugby league, born 2001), Australian rugby league player
