= Max Feagai =

New Zealand rugby league footballer

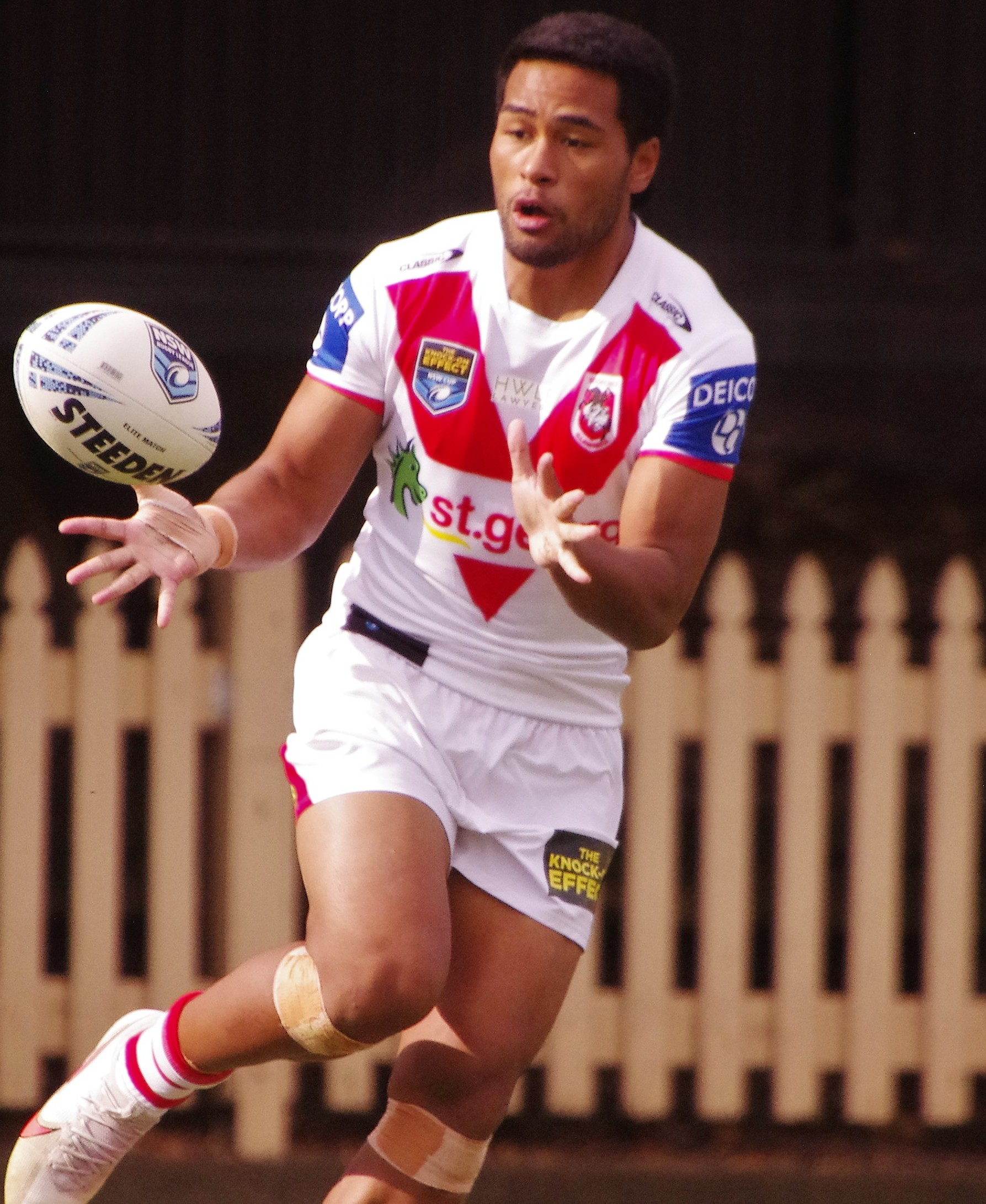

Personal information
- Born: 14 February 2001 (age 25) Hastings, New Zealand
- Height: 186 cm (6 ft 1 in)
- Weight: 98 kg (15 st 6 lb)

Playing information
- Position: Centre, Wing
Club
| Years | Team | Pld | T | G | FG | P |
|---|---|---|---|---|---|---|
| 2020–24 | St. George Illawarra | 23 | 3 | 0 | 0 | 12 |
| 2025 | Dolphins | 8 | 1 | 0 | 0 | 4 |
| 2026– | Gold Coast Titans | 3 | 0 | 0 | 0 | 0 |
| | Total | 34 | 4 | 0 | 0 | 16 |
- Source: As of 22 March 2026
- Relatives: Mat Feagai (twin brother)

Max Feagai (born 14 February 2001) is a professional rugby league footballer from New Zealand who plays as a winger or centre for the Gold Coast Titans in the National Rugby League (NRL).

He previously played for the Dolphins and the St. George Illawarra Dragons in the NRL.

== Background ==
Feagai was born in Hastings, New Zealand, and is of Samoan descent. He has a twin brother, Mat Feagai, who plays for the St. George Illawarra Dragons.

== Career ==
=== Early career ===
Feagai played his junior rugby league at the Leeton Greens in Group 20 Rugby League.

In 2019, he was selected for both the New South Wales Under-18's team and the Australian Schoolboys team after an impressive year where he won the 2019 S. G. Ball Cup with the Illawarra Steelers.

=== St. George Illawarra Dragons (2020-24) ===
Feagai made his debut for St. George Illawarra in their 42–18 loss against Newcastle in round 19 of the 2020 NRL season.

Feagai was limited to only four appearances in the 2021 NRL season which saw St. George Illawarra finish 11th and miss out on the finals.

Feagai was limited to only four games with St. George Illawarra in the 2022 NRL season as they missed the finals. Feagai would play a total of five games for the club in the 2023 NRL season as they finished 16th on the table.

On 11 September 2024, Feagai was confirmed to depart St. George Illawarra at the end of the season.

=== Dolphins (2025) ===
On 2 October 2024, it was announced that Feagai would join The Dolphins (NRL) on a two-year deal starting in 2025. His Dolphins' debut was in round 12 against the Canterbury-Bankstown Bulldogs at Accor Stadium.

=== Gold Coast Titans (2026-) ===
On 24 November 2025, the Gold Coast Titans announced the signing of Feagai on a two-year deal. Feagai was limited to only three appearances with the Gold Coast outfit in the 2026 NRL season.

== Statistics ==
| Season | Team | Games | Tries | Pts |
|---|---|---|---|---|
| 2020 | St. George Illawarra Dragons | 2 | 0 | 0 |
| 2021 | St. George Illawarra Dragons | 4 | 2 | 8 |
| 2023 | St. George Illawarra Dragons | 5 | 1 | 4 |
| 2024 | St. George Illawarra Dragons | 12 | 0 | 0 |
| 2025 | Dolphins | 8 | 1 | 4 |
| 2026 | Gold Coast Titans | 3 | | |
| | Totals | 34 | 4 | 16 |
