= Mat Feagai =

Samoa international rugby league footballer

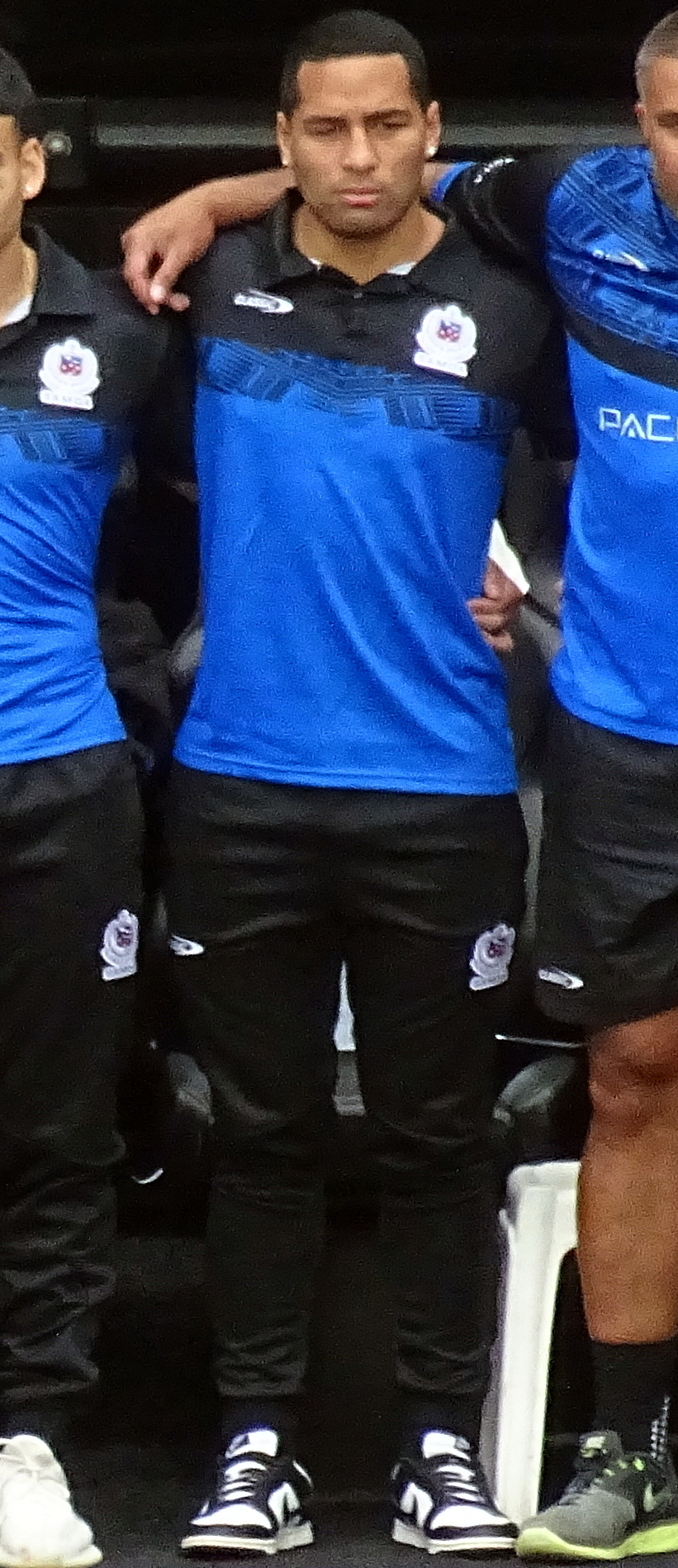

Personal information
- Full name: Mathew Feagai
- Born: 14 February 2001 (age 25) Hastings, New Zealand
- Height: 186 cm (6 ft 1 in)
- Weight: 96 kg (15 st 2 lb)

Playing information
- Position: Wing, Centre
Club
Years	Team	Pld	T	G	FG	P
2021–26	St. George Illawarra	86	32	0	0	128
2027–	Castleford Tigers	0	0	0	0	0
	Total	86	32	0	0	128
Representative
Years	Team	Pld	T	G	FG	P
2022–	Samoa	1	1	0		4
- Source: As of 20 November 2026
- Relatives: Max Feagai (twin brother)

Mathew Feagai (born 14 February 2001) is a Samoa international rugby league footballer who plays as a winger or centre for the Castleford Tigers in the Super League.

== Background ==
Feagai was born in Hastings, New Zealand, and is of Samoan descent. His twin brother, Max Feagai, also plays rugby league.

== Career ==
=== Early career ===
Feagai played his junior rugby league at the Leeton Greens in Group 20 Rugby League.

In 2019, he was selected for both the New South Wales Under-18's team and the Australian Schoolboys team after an impressive year where he won the 2019 S. G. Ball Cup with the Illawarra Steelers.

=== 2021 ===
Feagai made his debut in round 9 of the 2021 NRL season for St. George Illawarra in their 32–12 victory against Canterbury-Bankstown, scoring a try. Feagai played eight games throughout the season as St. George Illawarra finished 11th and missed the finals.

=== 2022 ===
During round 6 of the 2022 NRL season Feagai scored a double as the St. George Illawarra in their 21–16 win over the Newcastle Knights.

In round 25, Feagai scored two tries for St. George Illawarra in their victory over Brisbane.

In October Feagai was named in the Samoa squad for the 2021 Rugby League World Cup.

=== 2023 ===
In round 12 of the 2023 NRL season, Feagai scored the winning try for St. George Illawarra in the last minute of the match as they defeated the Sydney Roosters 24–22 at Kogarah Oval. Feagai would play a total of 23 games for the club in the 2023 NRL season as they finished 16th on the table.

=== 2024 ===
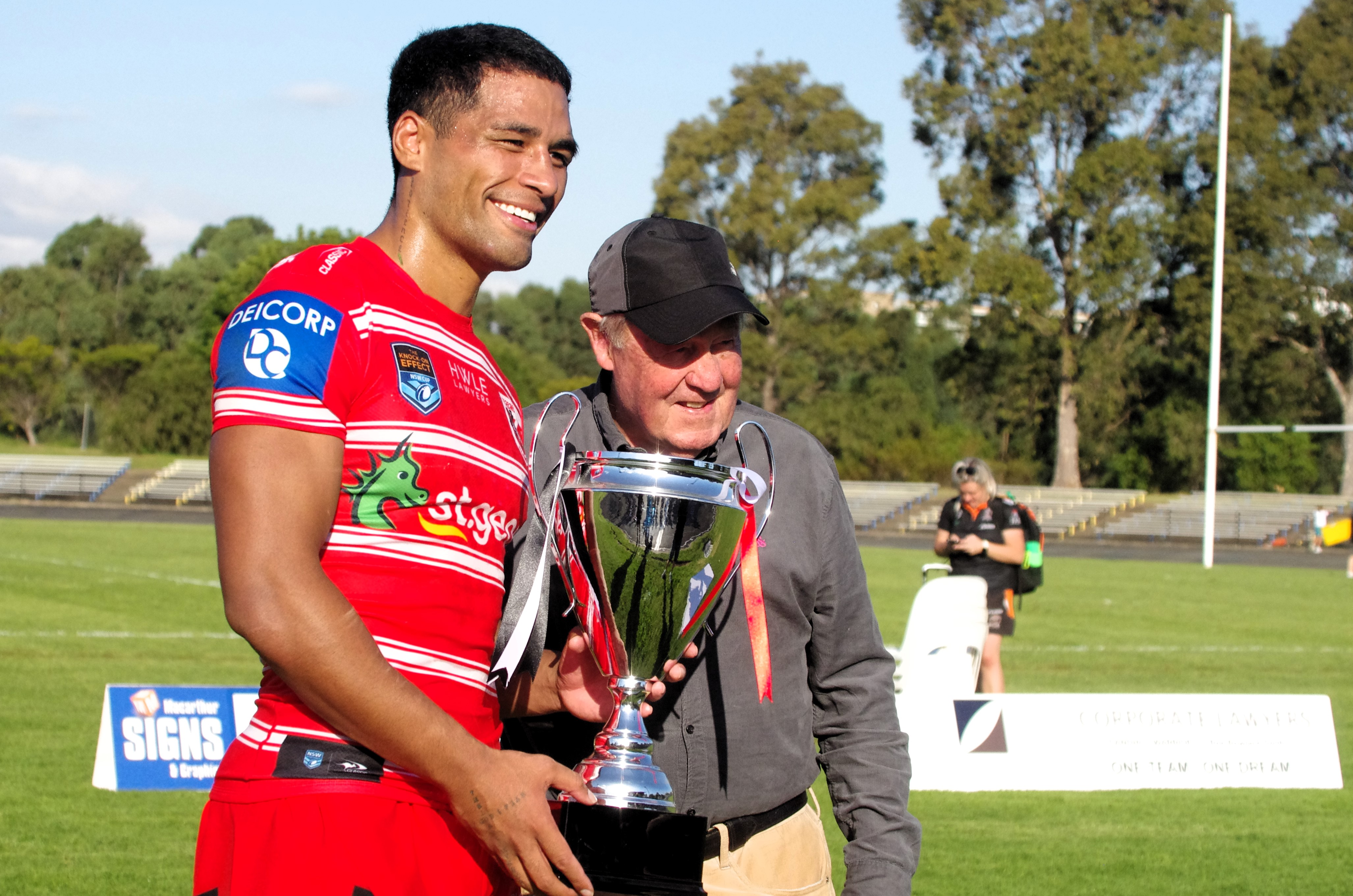
Feagai and Roy Masters in 2024

In round 14 of the 2024 NRL season, Feagai scored two tries for St. George Illawarra in their 56–14 victory over the Wests Tigers. Feagai signed a two-year extension with the club until the end of 2026. In round 26, he scored a hat-trick in the clubs 44–40 loss against Parramatta. It was the most points scored in a game by a losing team in NSWRL/NRL history.

=== 2025 ===
Feagai was limited to only eight appearances scoring 4 tries with St. George Illawarra in the 2025 NRL season as the club finished 15th on the table. On 28 September, Feagai played in St. George Illawarra's 30-12 NSW Cup Grand Final loss to New Zealand.

=== 2026 ===
On 15 May 2026 it was reported that he had signed for Castleford Tigers in the Super League on a 3-year deal for the 2027 season onwards.

=== Statistics ===
Season	Team	Pld	T	G	FG	P
2021	St. George Illawarra Dragons	8	3	-	-	12
2022	St. George Illawarra Dragons	20	10	-	-	40
2023	St. George Illawarra Dragons	23	4	-	-	16
2024	St. George Illawarra Dragons	9	6	-	-	24
2025	Dolphins	8	1	-	-	4
2026	Gold Coast Titans	3	-	-	-	-
2027	Castleford Tigers		-	-	-	-
	Totals	97	33	0	0	132
