= Tony Francis (rugby league) =

Lebanon international rugby league footballer

Personal information
- Born: 24 December 2002 (age 23) Sydney, New South Wales, Australia
- Height: 187 cm (6 ft 2 in)
- Weight: 97 kg (15 st 4 lb)

Playing information
- Position: Wing, Centre
Club
Years	Team	Pld	T	G	FG	P
2024–	Gold Coast Titans	10	1	0	0	4
Representative
Years	Team	Pld	T	G	FG	P
2026–	Lebanon	3	1	0	0	4
- Source: As of 16 November 2026
- Education: Westfields Sports High School; Marsden State High School
- Relatives: Lehi Hopoate (cousin); William Hopoate (cousin); Jamil Hopoate (cousin); Albert Hopoate Jnr (cousin); Albert Hopoate Snr (cousin)

Tony Francis (born 24 December 2002) is a Lebanon international rugby league footballer who plays as a winger for the Gold Coast Titans in the National Rugby League.

== Background ==
Francis was born in Sydney, Australia. His father was born in France to Lebanese parents, and his mother was born in New Zealand of Tongan and Fijian descent. He played junior rugby league for the Canley Vale Kookas and attended Westfields Sports High School. In 2019, he moved to Queensland, where he attended Marsden State High School in Brisbane.

== Playing career ==
=== Early career ===
In 2018, Francis played for the Manly Sea Eagles in the Harold Matthews Cup, starting at five-eighth and scoring a try in their Grand Final win over the Parramatta Eels.

In 2021, after two years under contract with the Brisbane Broncos, Francis signed with the Gold Coast Titans. That year he played for the Burleigh Bears in the Hastings Deering Colts.

On 17 September 2023, he scored a hat-trick for Burleigh in their Queensland Cup Grand Final loss to the Brisbane Tigers. On 13 October 2023, he re-signed with the Titans until the end of the 2025 season. On 22 October 2023, he represented Tonga A in their loss to New Zealand A.

=== 2024 ===
Francis began the 2024 season playing for the Tweed Seagulls in the Queensland Cup.

In Round 12 of the 2024 NRL season, he made his NRL debut in a 36–34 win over the Brisbane Broncos. He suffered an AC joint injury in the third minute, scoring a try in the 12th minute, before being taken from the field.

=== 2025 ===
Franics was limited to only eight matches for the Gold Coast in the 2025 NRL season as the club narrowly avoided the wooden spoon finishing 16th.

=== 2026 ===
He made his Lebanon international début in the 2026 Rugby League World Cup 42-18 defeat to Papua New Guinea on 17 October 2026.
