= New South Wales Under-20's rugby league team =

Rugby team

New South Wales Under-20
Team information
- Nickname: Blues
- Governing body: New South Wales Rugby League
- Head coach: Matt King
- Captain: Kyle Flanagan
- Home stadium: ANZ Stadium (83,500)

Uniforms
First colours

Team results
- First game
- New South Wales 18–14 Queensland (Penrith Stadium, Sydney; 21 April 2012)
- Biggest win
- New South Wales 30–8 Queensland (Penrith Stadium, Sydney; 3 May 2014)
- Biggest defeat
- Queensland 30–12 New South Wales (Suncorp Stadium, Brisbane; 11 July 2018)

The New South Wales Under-20's rugby league team, also known as New South Wales Under-20s or New South Wales U20, represents New South Wales in the sport of rugby league at an under-20 age level. Since 2012, the team has played an annual fixture against the Queensland Under-20s team for the Darren Lockyer Shield. The team features players selected from the National Rugby League (NRL), Holden Cup, Jersey Flegg Cup and Intrust Super Premiership competitions. They are administered by the New South Wales Rugby League.

== History ==
Prior to the advent of the National Youth Competition, junior interstate matches were contested at under-17 and under-19 levels. In 2008, the age levels switched to an under-16 and under-18 format but no under-20 game was held until 2012. In March 2012, the first under-20 Origin match was announced by the National Rugby League. The NRL had been looking into running the match for more than 18 months.

From 2012 to 2014, the under-20 Origin fixture was held in April, on the Representative Weekend. In 2015, the game was moved to July as a curtain-raiser to State of Origin. As of 2017, the New South Wales under-20 team have for every fixture, winning six consecutive games since 2012. In 2018, they recorded their first lose, losing to Queensland 30–12 at Suncorp Stadium.

== Players ==
Players selected for the New South Wales under-20 team are under contract with a National Rugby League (NRL) side and play in either the NRL, Holden Cup, Jersey Flegg Cup or Intrust Super Premiership competitions. Since 2013, the NSWRL's selected a pre-season under-20 squad featuring players in contention for the mid-season fixture.

== Results ==
=== 2012 ===
21 April 2012

New South Wales U20	18–14	Queensland U20
Tries; Kane Evans 1 Chanel Mata'utia 1 Harry Siejka 1 Goals; Harry Siejka 3	Report	Tries; 2 Edrick Lee; 1 Aaron Whitchurch Goals; 1 Mitchell Frei

Centerbet Stadium, Penrith
Player of the Match: Harry Siejka (NSW)

New South Wales Under-20
2012 team		Coaching staff
1 Evander CUMMINS – FB; 2 Young TONUMAIPEA – WG; 3 Cheyse BLAIR – CE; 4 Ed MURPHY – CE; 5 Chanel MATA’UTIA – WG; 6 Harry SIEJKA – FE; 7 Jacob MILLER – HB; 8 Matt GROAT – PR; 9 Michael LICHAA – HK; 10 Shannon BOYD – PR; 11 Alex McKINNON – SR; 12 Boyd CORDNER (c) – SR; 13 Vaipuna TIA KILIFI – LK	14 Kane EVANS – UT; 15 Paul CARTER – UT; 16 Jack STOCKWELL – UT; 17 David KLEMMER – UT	Head coach: Dean PAY; Legend: (c) Captain(s); (vc) Vice-captain(s); Updated: 8 September 2018; Source(s): NYCDB

=== 2013 ===
Played as a curtain raiser to the Samoa-Tonga Pacific Rugby League test match.

20 April 2013

New South Wales U20	36–12	Queensland U20
Tries; Mitchell Cornish 2 George Jennings 2 Charly Runciman 2 Michael Lichaa 1 ' Goals; Dylan Walker 4	Report	Tries; 1 Anthony Milford; 1 Brandon Tago Goals; 2 Anthony Milford

Centerbet Stadium, Sydney
Player of the Match: Mitchell Cornish (NSW)

New South Wales Under-20
2013 team		Coaching staff
1 Clinton GUTHERSON – FB; 2 Vai TOUTAI – WG; 3 Dylan WALKER – CE; 4 Charly RUNCIMAN – CE; 5 George JENNINGS – WG; 6 Luke BROOKS – FE; 7 Mitchell CORNISH – HB; 8 David KLEMMER (c) – PR; 9 Michael LICHAA – HK; 10 Matthew LODGE – PR; 11 Kelepi TANGINOA – SR; 12 Dean BRITT – SR; 13 Brenden SANTI – LK	14 Craig GARVEY – UT; 15 Kyle LOVETT – UT; 16 Jake TRBOJEVIC – UT; 17 Junior PAULO – UT	Head coach: Dean PAY; Legend: (c) Captain(s); (vc) Vice-captain(s); Updated: 8 September 2018; Source(s): NYCDB

=== 2014 ===
Played as a curtain raiser to the Samoa-Fiji Pacific Rugby League test match.

3 May 2014

New South Wales U20	30–8	Queensland U20
Tries; Jake Mamo 3 Sione Mata'utia 1 Tyrone Phillips 1 Goals; Clinton Gutherson 5	Report	Tries; 1 Luke Bateman; 1 John Folau

Sportingbet Stadium, Penrith
Player of the Match: Jake Mamo (NSW)

New South Wales Under-20
2014 team		Coaching staff
1 Clinton GUTHERSON – FB; 2 Jake MAMO – WG; 3 Sione MATA’UTIA – CE; 4 Aaron GRAY – CE; 5 Tyrone PHILLIPS – WG; 6 Drew HUTCHISON – FE; 7 Mitchell MOSES – HB; 8 Matthew LODGE – PR; 9 Kaysa PRITCHARD (c) – HK; 10 Jake TRBOJEVIC – PR; 11 Jakiel MARINER – SR; 12 Adam ELLIOTT – SR; 13 Jack BIRD – LK	14 Ryan MATTERSON – UT; 15 Pauli PAULI – UT; 16 Dean BRITT – UT; 17 Rhys KENNEDY – UT	Head coach: Dean PAY; Legend: (c) Captain(s); (vc) Vice-captain(s); Updated: 8 September 2018; Source(s): NYCDB

=== 2015 ===
Played as a curtain raiser to Game III of the 2015 State of Origin series.

8 July 2015

Queensland U20	16–32	New South Wales U20
Tries; Alex Barr 1 Luke Bateman 1 Gideon Gela-Mosby 1 Goals; Ashley Taylor 2	Report	Tries; 4 Brian Kelly; 1 Jackson Hastings; 1 Latrell Mitchell Goals; 3 Jackson Hastings; 1 Addison Demetriou

Suncorp Stadium, Brisbane
Referee: Matt Noyen
Player of the Match: Drew Hutchison (NSW)

New South Wales Under-20
2015 team		Coaching staff
1 Latrell MITCHELL – FB; 2 Brian KELLY – WG; 3 John OLIVE – CE; 4 Robert JENNINGS – CE; 5 Brent NADEN – WG; 6 Jackson HASTINGS – FE; 7 Drew HUTCHISON (c) – HB; 8 Alex TWAL – PR; 9 Grant GARVEY – HK; 10 Liam KNIGHT – PR; 11 Joe STIMSON – SR; 12 Tyrell FUIMAONO – SR; 13 Luke YATES – LK	14 Jacob LIDDLE – UT; 15 Oliver CLARK – UT; 16 Addison DEMETRIOU – UT; 17 Hame SELE – UT	Head coach: Dean PAY; Legend: (c) Captain(s); (vc) Vice-captain(s); Updated: 8 September 2018; Source(s): NYCDB

=== 2016 ===
Played as a curtain raiser to Game III of the 2016 State of Origin series.

13 July 2016

Queensland U20	22–36	New South Wales U20
Tries; Bernard Lewis 3 Gideon Gela-Mosby 1 Bacho Salam 1 Goals; Brodie Croft 1	Report	Tries; 1 Jack Cogger; 1 Lachlan Croker; 1 Matthew Dufty; 1 Reuben Garrick; 1 Bayley Sironen; 1 Zac Woolford Goals; 6 Brian Kelly

ANZ Stadium, Sydney
Referee: Peter Gough
Player of the Match: Curtis Scott (NSW)

New South Wales Under-20
2016 team		Coaching staff
1 Matthew DUFTY – FB; 2 Brian KELLY – WG; 3 Cory DENNISS – CE; 4 Curtis SCOTT – CE; 5 Reuben GARRICK – WG; 6 Lachlan CROKER – FE; 7 Jack COGGER (c) – HB; 8 Oliver CLARK – PR; 9 Grant GARVEY – HK; 10 Alex TWAL – PR; 11 Tyrell FUIMAONO – SR; 12 Bayley SIRONEN – SR; 13 Nat BUTCHER – LK	14 Zac WOOLFORD – UT; 15 Taniela PASEKA – UT; 16 Max ELLIOTT – UT; 17 Tevita COTTRELL – UT	Head coach: Dean PAY; Legend: (c) Captain(s); (vc) Vice-captain(s); Updated: 8 September 2018; Source(s): NYCDB

=== 2017 ===
Played as a curtain raiser to Game I of the 2017 State of Origin series.

31 May 2017

Queensland U20	16–30	New South Wales U20
Tries; Brodie Croft 1 Corey Horsburgh 1 Tristan Sailor 1 Goals; Tristan Sailor 2	Report	Tries; 1 Nat Butcher; 1 Jai Field; 1 Reuben Garrick; 1 Blake Lawrie; 1 Jack Murchie Goals; 5 Jai Field

Suncorp Stadium, Brisbane
Referee: Jarrod Cole, Adam Cassidy
Player of the Match: Jack Murchie (NSW)

New South Wales Under-20
2017 team		Coaching staff
1 Nick MEANEY – FB; 2 Isaac LUMELUME – WG; 3 Jesse RAMIEN – CE; 4 Curtis SCOTT – CE; 5 Reuben GARRICK – WG; 6 Jai FIELD – FE; 7 Troy DARGAN – HB; 14 Victor RADLEY – PR; 9 Reece ROBSON – HK; 10 Blake LAWRIE – PR; 11 Cameron MURRAY (c) – SR; 12 Jack MURCHIE – SR; 13 Nat BUTCHER – LK	8 Emre GULER – LK; 15 Ray STONE – UT; 16 Stefano HALA – UT; 17 Billy MAGOULIAS – UT	Head coach: Danny BUDERUS; Legend: (c) Captain(s); (vc) Vice-captain(s); Updated: 8 September 2018; Source(s): NYCDB

=== 2018 ===
Played as a curtain raiser to Game III of the 2018 State of Origin series.

11 July 2018

Queensland U20	30–12	New South Wales U20
Tries; Jake Clifford 2 Corey Horsburgh 1 Tristan Sailor 1 Kurt Wiltshire 1 Goals; Jake Clifford 5	Report	Tries; 1 Billy Smith; 1 Brian Too Goals; 2 Kyle Flanagan

Suncorp Stadium, Brisbane
Referee: Ben Watts
Player of the Match: Jake Clifford (QLD)

New South Wales Under-20
2018 team		Coaching staff
1 Ryan PAPENHUYZEN – FB; 2 Billy SMITH – WG; 3 Matheson JOHNS – CE; 4 Bronson XERRI – CE; 5 Brian TOO – WG; 6 Brendan O’HAGAN – FE; 7 Kyle FLANAGAN (c) – HB; 8 Oregon KAUFUSI – PR; 9 Reece ROBSON – HK; 10 Emre GULER – PR; 11 Billy BURNS – SR; 17 Teig WILTON – SR; 13 Josh CURRAN – LK	14 Blayke BRAILEY – UT; 15 Ky RODWELL – UT; 16 Stefano HALA – UT; 18 Josh CARR – UT	Head coach: Matt KING; Legend: (c) Captain(s); (vc) Vice-captain(s); Updated: 8 September 2018; Source(s): NYCDB

== See also ==
- New South Wales State team
- New South Wales Residents team
- New South Wales Women's team
- New South Wales Under-18 team
- New South Wales Under-16 team
- Junior Kangaroos team
- Jersey Flegg Cup
- New South Wales Rugby League
- Country Rugby League
