= Lehi Hopoate =

Tonga international rugby league footballer (born 2005)

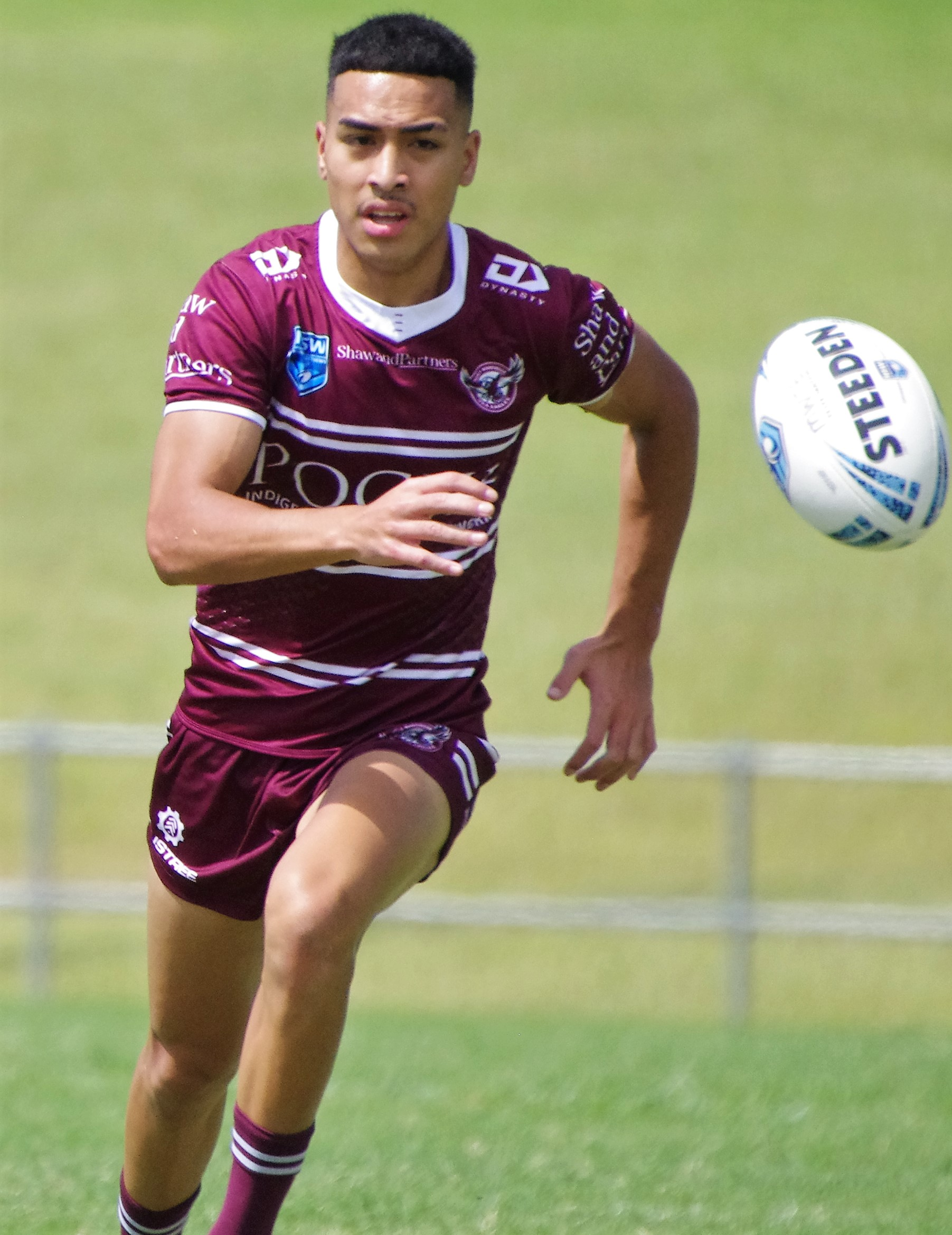

Personal information
- Born: 26 January 2005 (age 21) Manly, New South Wales, Australia
- Height: 190 cm (6 ft 3 in)
- Weight: 84 kg (13 st 3 lb)

Playing information
- Position: Wing, Fullback
Club
Years	Team	Pld	T	G	FG	P
2024–	Manly Sea Eagles	59	36	0	0	144
Representative
Years	Team	Pld	T	G	FG	P
2024–	Tonga	9	0	0	0	0
- Source: As of 7 November 2026
- Education: St Augustine's College
- Father: John Hopoate
- Relatives: William Hopoate (brother); Jamil Hopoate (brother); Albert Hopoate (brother); Albert Hopoate (uncle); Tony Francis (cousin)

Lehi Hopoate (born 26 January 2005) is a Tonga international rugby league footballer who plays as a winger or fullback for the Manly Warringah Sea Eagles in the National Rugby League.

== Background ==
Hopoate is of Tongan descent through his father John Hopoate who was an Australian, Tongan, and New South Wales State of Origin representative. His older brothers William Hopoate, Jamil Hopoate, and Albert Hopoate also played rugby league professionally.

Hopoate attended St Augustine's College at Brookvale and played his junior rugby league for the Beacon Hill Bears, before being signed by the Manly Warringah Sea Eagles.

== Playing career ==
=== Early years ===
Hopoate rose through the grades at the Manly Sea Eagles, playing for their Harold Matthews Cup and S. G. Ball Cup sides, also appearing for the New South Wales under-16s side in 2021.

=== 2024 ===
Hopoate made his first grade debut at fullback in place of the injured Tom Trbojevic in his side's 26–20 victory over the Melbourne Storm at Brookvale Oval in round 12 of the 2024 NRL season. In round 19, Hopoate scored two tries for Manly in their 44-6 win over Newcastle. He played a total of 14 games for Manly in the 2024 NRL season, mostly on the wing, as they finished 7th on the table and qualified for the finals. Manly would be eliminated in the second week of the finals by the Sydney Roosters.

Lehi Hopoate's form was such that at the 2024 Manly awards night he won the Ken Arthurson Rising Star Award as the clubs Rookie of the Year. Hopoate was then one of four Manly players named in the Tongan squad (along with Tolu Koula, Haumole Olakau'atu and Taniela Paseka) for the 2024 Pacific Championships. Playing at fullback, Hopoate made his test debut for Tonga on 18 October against Australia at Suncorp Stadium in Brisbane. The Kangaroos won the game 18–0.

=== 2025 ===
In February, Hopoate would extend his contract and be elevated into Manly's top 30 squad. In round 12 of the 2025 NRL season, Hopoate scored two tries for Manly in their upset 30-10 loss against Parramatta. Hopoate played 22 games for Manly in the 2025 NRL season as the club finished 10th on the table.

=== 2026 ===
Hopoate played 23 games for Manly in the 2026 NRL season and scored 19 tries as the club finished 9th on the table.

== Statistics ==
Year	Team	Games	Tries	Pts
2024	Manly Warringah Sea Eagles	14	9	36
2025	Manly Warringah Sea Eagles	22	8	32
2026	Manly Warringah Sea Eagles	23	19	76
2027	Manly Warringah Sea Eagles			
	Totals	59	36	144
