= Albert Hopoate (rugby league, born 2001) =

Australian rugby league footballer

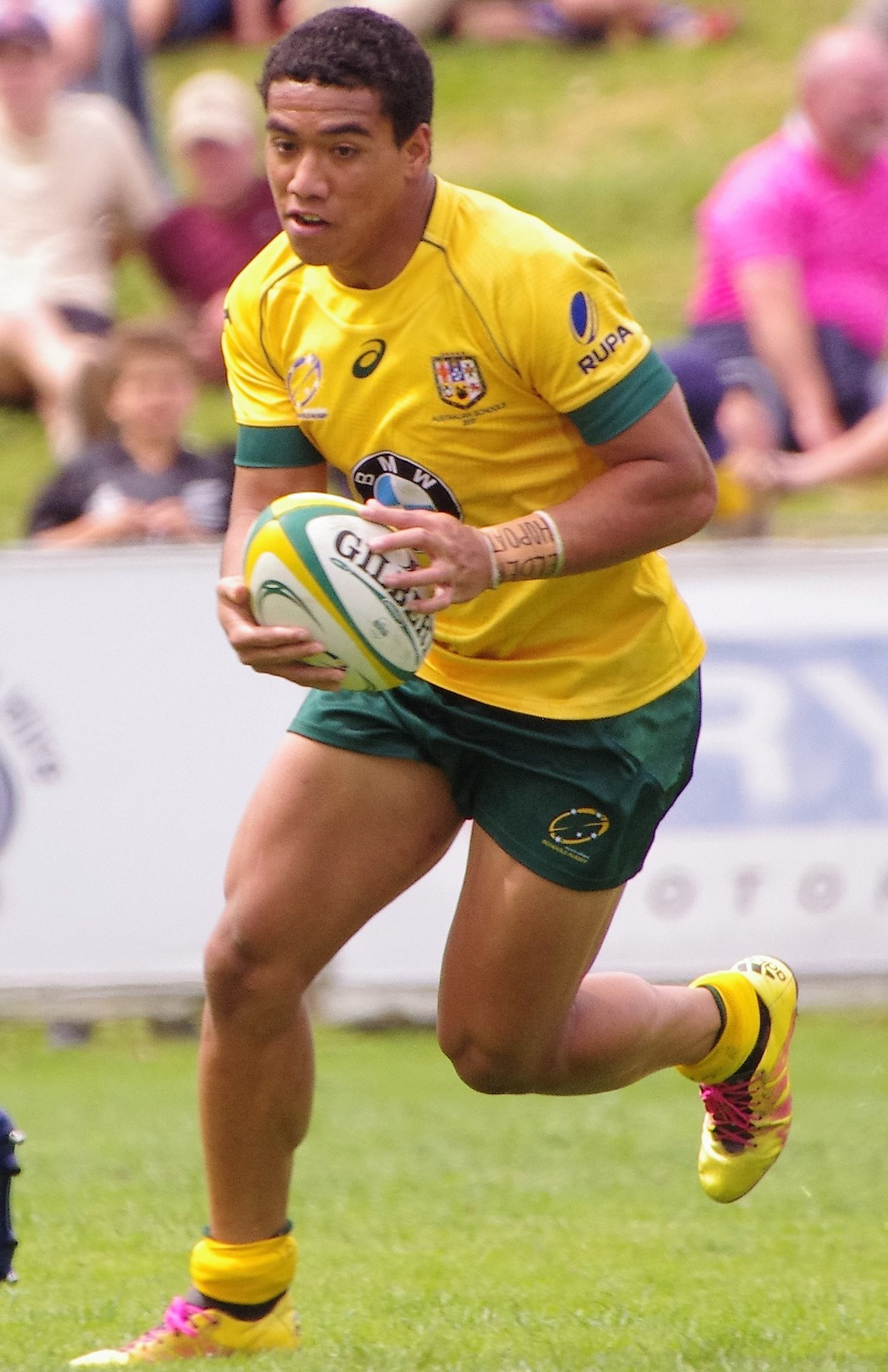

Personal information
- Born: 25 February 2001 (age 25) Sydney, New South Wales, Australia
- Height: 6 ft 0 in (1.83 m)
- Weight: 15 st 10 lb (100 kg)

Playing information
- Position: Wing, Centre
Club
| Years | Team | Pld | T | G | FG | P |
|---|---|---|---|---|---|---|
| 2020 | Manly Sea Eagles | 5 | 0 | 0 | 0 | 0 |
| 2022–25 | Canberra Raiders | 37 | 13 | 0 | 0 | 52 |
| 2026– | Warrington Wolves | 30 | 16 | 0 | 0 | 64 |
| | Total | 72 | 29 | 0 | 0 | 116 |
- Source: As of 7 February 2026
- Father: John Hopoate
- Relatives: William Hopoate (brother); Jamil Hopoate (brother); Lehi Hopoate (brother); Albert Hopoate (uncle); Tony Francis (cousin)

Albert Hopoate (born 25 February 2001) is an Australian professional rugby league footballer who plays as a winger or centre for the Warrington Wolves in the Super League.

He previously played for the Manly Warringah Sea Eagles and the Canberra Raiders in the NRL.

== Background ==
Hopoate is of Tongan descent through his father John Hopoate who was an Australian, Tongan and New South Wales State of Origin representative. His brothers William Hopoate, Lehi Hopoate and Jamil Hopoate also play rugby league professionally. His younger sister, Kalosipani, plays for the Canterbury-Bankstown Bulldogs NRLW side.

Albert played his junior rugby league for the Beacon Hill Bears, before being signed by the Manly Warringah Sea Eagles. He attended St Augustine's in Brookvale.

== Playing career ==
=== Early years ===
Hopoate rose through the grades at the Manly-Warringah club, playing for their Harold Matthews Cup and S. G. Ball Cup sides, also appearing for the New South Wales under-16s side in 2017. He also played for the Australian Schoolboys rugby union team, New South Wales National Youth rugby sevens and Australian World Schools rugby sevens teams in 2017.

=== 2020 ===
In August, Manly agreed to loan Hopoate to the New Zealand Warriors for four games. A week later, the deal was cancelled after Manly required Hopoate due to an injury to centre Moses Suli. Hopoate made his NRL debut for Manly-Warringah in round 16 of the 2020 NRL season, a 6–30 loss to the Melbourne Storm.

In December, Hopoate signed a one-year contract with the Canberra Raiders starting in 2021.

=== 2022 ===
In round 18 against the Melbourne Storm Hopoate played his first game for the capital club, and the following week against the New Zealand Warriors he scored his first try as a Canberra Raiders player. Hopoate played seven matches and scored three tries in the 2022 NRL season. Hopoate did not play in either of Canberra's finals games.

=== 2023 ===
In round 13, Hopoate scored his first NRL hat-trick in Canberra's 33-26 victory over South Sydney at Accor Stadium. Hopoate played a total of 20 matches for Canberra in the 2023 NRL season as the club finished 8th on the table and qualified for the finals.

=== 2024 ===
Hopoate played nine games for Canberra in the 2024 NRL season as the club finished 9th on the table.

=== 2025 ===
Hopoate would be ruled out for the rest of the season after he tore his ACL during a NSW cup match. Hopoate was one of six members of Canberra to depart at the end of their season. In October, it was reported that Hopoate is to join the Warrington Wolves in the super league.

On 7 October 2025 it was reported that he had signed a two-year deal with Warrington in the Super League.

=== 2026 ===
Hopoate made his club debut for Warrington in round 1 of the 2026 Super League season against St Helens which ended in a 24-14 victory. He scored his first try for the club in this victory. He also scored in his second ever Super League game in the 27-16 victory over Wakefield Trinity. On 3 October, Hopoate played in the 2026 Super League Grand Final, which Warrington lost to Wakefield Trinity 23-10.

== Statistics ==
| Year | Team | Games | Tries | Pts |
|---|---|---|---|---|
| 2020 | Manly Warringah Sea Eagles | 5 | | |
| 2022 | Canberra Raiders | 7 | 3 | 12 |
| 2023 | Canberra Raiders | 20 | 8 | 32 |
| 2024 | Canberra Raiders | 9 | 2 | 8 |
| 2025 | Canberra Raiders | 1 | | |
| 2026 | Warrington Wolves | 30 | 16 | 64 |
| | Totals | 72 | 29 | 116 |
