= John Hopoate =

Australia & Tonga international rugby league footballer

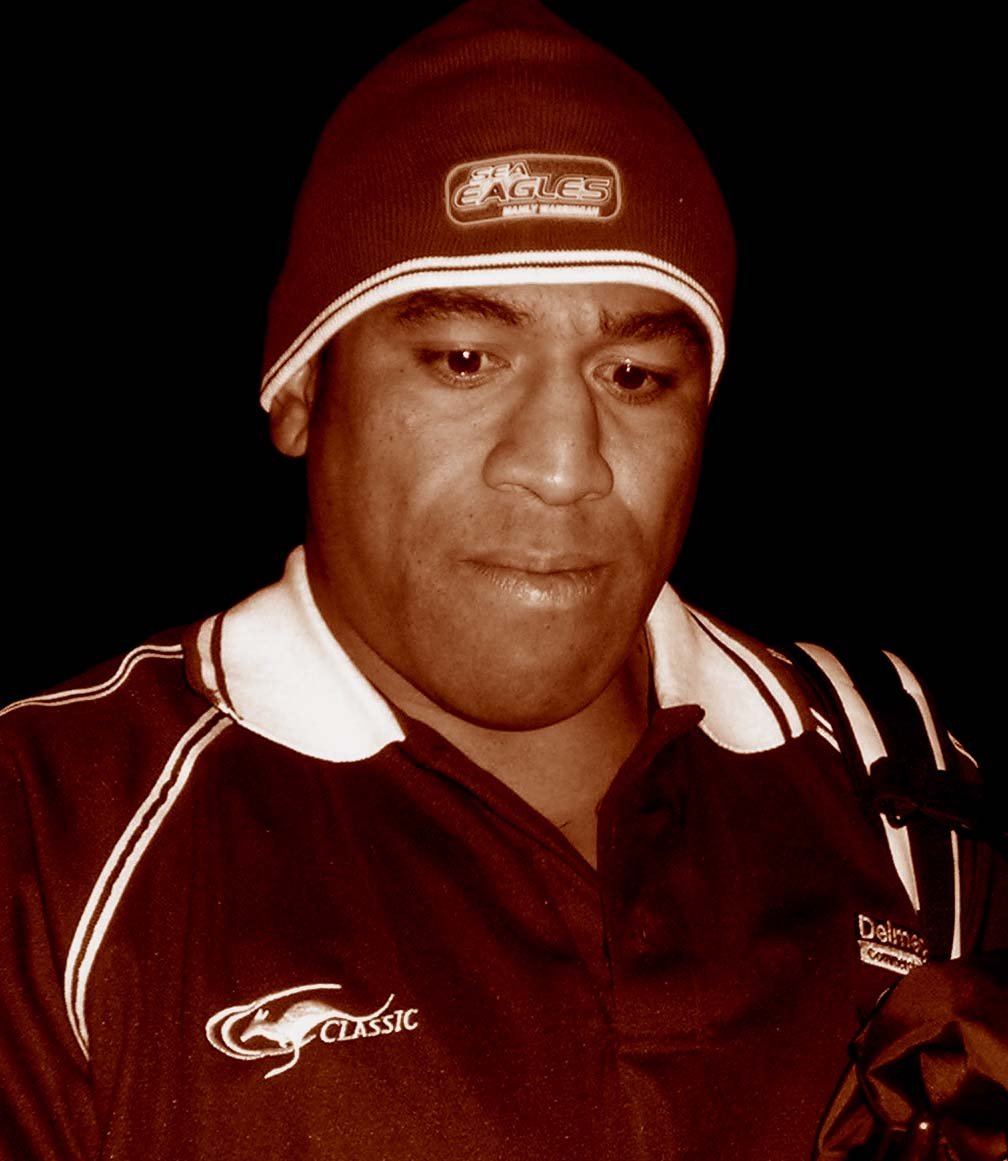
- Hopoate in 2008

Personal information
- Born: 16 January 1974 (age 52) Nukuʻalofa, Tonga

Playing information
- Height: 182 cm (6 ft 0 in)
- Weight: 104 kg (16 st 5 lb)
- Position: Wing
Club
| Years | Team | Pld | T | G | FG | P |
|---|---|---|---|---|---|---|
| 1993–99 | Manly Sea Eagles | 123 | 62 | 0 | 0 | 248 |
| 2000–01 | Wests Tigers | 28 | 6 | 0 | 0 | 24 |
| 2001–02 | Northern Eagles | 31 | 12 | 0 | 0 | 48 |
| 2003–05 | Manly Sea Eagles | 27 | 7 | 0 | 0 | 28 |
| | Total | 209 | 87 | 0 | 0 | 348 |
Representative
| Years | Team | Pld | T | G | FG | P |
| 1994 | Tonga | 1 | 0 | 0 | 0 | 0 |
| 1995 | New South Wales | 1 | 0 | 0 | 0 | 0 |
| 1995 | Australia | 2 | 3 | 0 | 0 | 12 |
| 1997–03 | City NSW | 3 | 0 | 0 | 0 | 0 |
- Relatives: William Hopoate (son); Jamil Hopoate (son); Albert Hopoate (son); Lehi Hopoate (son); Albert Hopoate (brother)

John Hopoate (born 16 January 1974 in Tonga) is a former professional rugby league player and boxer who was involved in sport controversies and subsequently convicted for violent crimes. He played rugby league in the Tonga national rugby league team, Australian Rugby League team, NSW State of Origin team and in the National Rugby League (NRL) for Manly-Warringah Sea Eagles (including their 1996 premiership team), Wests Tigers and the Northern Eagles. He became the "most suspended player of the modern era". In 2018 he was banned for 10 years by the NSWRL from any involvement in its and affiliated rugby league.

Hopoate was the Australian heavyweight boxing champion from 2008 to 2009.

He is the father of footballers William, Jamil, Lehi and Albert Hopoate.

== Childhood and personal life ==
Hopoate was born in Nukuʻalofa, Tonga on 16 January 1974. His family moved to Australia and he lived in the Manly area of Sydney before moving to the western suburbs as a teenager. Hopoate is a member of the Church of Jesus Christ of Latter-day Saints.

== Rugby League career ==
Former Australian international Bob Fulton recruited Hopoate to the Manly club after witnessing his power and skill playing as a junior for a Manly Cove team before then going on to play in the New South Wales Under-19 team.

=== 1993–1999 Manly-Warringah Sea Eagles ===
Hopoate signed with the Manly-Warringah Sea Eagles club in 1993 when he was 19 years old, and made his first grade debut against the Canberra Raiders at Brookvale Oval on 6 June that year. He played in the Tonga national rugby league team in the 1994 Pacific Cup, although he was regularly in and out of the first grade team, not holding down a regular position until 1995.

Hopoate's early season form in 1995 was excellent as he went on to score 11 tries from his first 11 first grade appearances and subsequently lead the try scoring table. After his form and try scoring feats during the 1995 season, Hopoate was called up to his first senior representative match for New South Wales in Game 2 of the 1995 State of Origin series but was unavailable for the third game due to injury.

Over the remaining rounds of the 1995 ARL season Hopoate went on to score 21 tries, finishing second in the top try-scoring table to teammate Steve Menzies. He was instrumental in Manly's good form leading into the finals series, although Manly eventually lost to the Bulldogs.

The Tongan rugby league team looked to pick Hopoate based on his nation of birth for the 1995 World Cup, but the Australian Rugby League selected him in the Kangaroos team under the residency rule. He played in the opening match of the cup but failed to score, and then made a mistake that became the turning point in a match that was eventually won by the English team. In the following match, against the South African team, Hopoate scored three times in the 86 to 6 victory.

In his fourth season at Manly, Hopoate was again instrumental in his team's fortunes. He began the season slowly in comparison to his previous year, with only five tries over the first 20 rounds of the season, but his defence had improved immensely; helping his team to concede fewer tries. He scored another six tries for the season including four in one game against the South Sydney Rabbitohs, and ultimately helped his Manly team to their first premiership in eight years.

In the 1997 season, Hopoate again started the season slowly, scoring only two tries in 12 games, but in the Round 12 match against the St. George Dragons he scored three tries and continued his form scoring eight tries in his next six games and a total of 15 for the season.

=== 2000–2001 Wests Tigers ===
Signing for the newly-merged Wests Tigers in 2000, Hopoate scored just five tries in the season. He was suspended several times during the season, including being charged with 'contrary conduct' in a late season game against Melbourne as a result of more than ten separate incidents in that game.

In 2001, Hopoate began the season poorly, scoring only one try in several games, before involvement in incidents of inserting his fingers into the anuses of three players which led to him being suspended for 12 weeks and agreeing to part ways with the Tigers club.

=== 2001–2002 Northern Eagles ===
Manly reserve grade team signed him for the remainder of the season where his good form earned him a call-up to the Northern Eagles first grade team late in the season. Hopoate ran 3,976 metres with the ball over the 2002 NRL season, more than any other player in the competition. In the following year, he scored ten tries for the Eagles before the club disbanded in 2003.

=== 2003–2005 Manly-Warringah Sea Eagles ===
With the reinstatement of the Sea Eagles for the beginning of the 2003 season, Hopoate was re-signed to the club where he made his debut ten years earlier. He began the season with several impressive performances but, again, his on-field indiscretions were an issue.

His following two seasons were poor, with several on-field and off-field incidents earning him both fines and suspensions. In a 2005 game against the Cronulla-Sutherland Sharks, Hopoate attempted a reckless shoulder charge, making contact to the head of forward Keith Galloway with his elbow. Hopoate was suspended for 17 weeks by the NRL and the Manly club terminated his contract, effectively ending his career. He made a final statement on the Sea Eagles website thanking his fans and supporters, and apologising to his wife Brenda and eight children.

== Rugby league controversies ==
=== 2001 on-field indecent assaults ===
During a 2001 game with the North Queensland Cowboys, Hopoate inserted fingers in three players' buttocks and anuses. The first incident occurred during the seventh minute of play. The matter was referred to the rugby league judiciary on 28 March. Hopoate was suspended for 12 weeks for what one commissioner described as "disgusting, violent, offensive behaviour".

Hopoate claimed, in front of the panel of judges, that he was just trying to give all three players a wedgie with his fingers, denying he had done anything wrong and that he was "a great believer in what happens on the field should stay there". The three victims in the case, Cowboys players Glenn Morrison, Peter Jones and Paul Bowman, all disagreed with Hopoate's reasoning. According to Jones, "It wasn't a wedgie. That's when your pants are pulled up your arse. I think I know the difference between a wedgie and someone sticking their finger up my bum", while Bowman said he was "disgusted" and "couldn't believe it". Hopoate was found guilty of 'unsportsmanlike interference'.

=== 2003 breach of contract ===
In the 2003 season, Hopoate breached the terms of his playing contract by playing in a fifth-grade rugby union match in the Sydney competition on 9 June under a false name in an attempt to not get caught. After his Manly club found out and confronted Hopoate he admitted that he had breached his contract and was fined $5000.

=== 2004–2005 abuse of sideline officials ===
During the 2004 club season, Hopoate became involved in more controversy. While leaving the field at the conclusion of a match, Hopoate started a heated argument with a touch judge in which he verbally abused the official. Hopoate was given a lengthy suspension by the NRL.

In the Round 1 clash with the New Zealand Warriors, Hopoate verbally abused a 14-year-old rugby league ball boy who had placed the ball on the sideline of the field rather than throwing it infield to the Manly player. The NRL review found that the ball boy had acted within the guidelines and Hopoate was in the wrong for his verbal assault. Hopoate apologised to the young boy, claiming that he "was not aware of the proper interpretation of the rule" and was in the wrong.

=== 2005 elbow to head incident ===
On 19 March 2005, Hopoate was again in trouble with the NRL, this time in a match against the Cronulla-Sutherland Sharks. During the 30th minute of the game he made a charge at Cronulla forward Keith Galloway with his elbow in a cocked position jumping and striking Galloway in the head immediately knocking him unconscious, leaving him with a laceration to and bleeding from his ear. After immediate review from the third official Hopoate was sent from the field for the remainder of the match while Galloway was stretchered from the field in a neck brace and took no further part in the game.

The NRL match review committee referred Hopoate's conduct to the NRL Judiciary. At the judiciary hearing on 22 March, Hopoate's lawyer and coach attempted to argue that he was doing nothing more than "trying to go for a shoulder charge" and that his raised arm was just an attempt to protect his ribs. His contrition carried little weight with the panel and ultimately his defence failed to convince them that he had done nothing wrong and he was given a 17-game suspension. With his season over, the Manly club, that had stood by him through many of his career indiscretions, decided to terminate his contract with immediate effect on 23 March 2005.

=== 2005 threats to junior official ===
On 9 December 2005, Hopoate was banned from NRL rugby league for 12 months after threatening a junior official at a local match.

=== Post-playing incidents ===
==== 2016 attempted coaching without NRL registration ====
In 2016, Hopoate started coaching Manly's S. G. Ball Cup side until the NRL claimed the former international was not of fit and proper character to mentor young and impressionable men, threatening the Sea Eagles with a breach notice if they did not stand Hopoate down. The NRL then released a statement saying, "He is not registered to coach. Mr Hopoate has taken the matter to the Supreme Court. The NRL is contesting his case and has not changed its stance at all". In a social media post, Hopoate wrote "I'm Back, NRL asked if we can withdraw our court proceedings cause they don't have jurisdiction over SG Ball, so I can coach this week cheeho!" He followed up with the hashtag: “#NoHardFeelingsTimeToMoveOnAndLetThePastBeThePast#”. The NRL denied it had cleared Hopoate to coach, tweeting: "The NRL has NOT cleared John Hopoate to coach Manly’s SG Ball side". On 30 July 2016, Hopoate was forced to pay legal costs after he dropped his court case against the NRL. The NRL threatened to fine Manly $1 million and Hopoate $100,000 if he continued coaching.

==== 2017 threats to New Zealand World Cup player ====
In October 2017, Hopoate joined the Tongan camp for the 2017 Rugby League World Cup. In the build up to the tournament New Zealand player Adam Blair commented on Jason Taumalolo's defection to Tonga saying "You've got to be a man and own up to what you want to do, If you were man enough, you'd make the phone call and tell them". On 12 October, Hopoate responded to Blair's comments saying "Who the hell is Adam Blair to come and say that?, They don't say anything when we name him in our team and that they were meant to turn up for a camp – they name him and take him out of our team, So what are they complaining about? He wants to come play for his heritage and who the hell is Adam Blair?. I'll bash Adam Blair I don't care.

==== 2018 ten-year ban for punching and threatening players ====
On 24 July 2018, Hopoate was charged by the NSWRL for punching opposition players while playing for the Narraweena Hawks against Forestville in a local A grade match. It was alleged that Hopoate also threatened players of the Forestville Ferrets side. He was subsequently banned from all involvement in NSWRL rugby league for 10 years.

==== 2018 rubber glove prank ====
On 17 November 2018, Hopoate played for Manly in the Legends of League charity event. He was allowed to participate because the event was not controlled by the NSWRL. Hopoate courted controversy as he wore a rubber glove on one hand during a match against Newcastle, referencing his 12-week suspension in 2001 for sticking his finger into the anus of opposition players. The media branded the prank "grubby" and "repulsive".

=== 2024 Banned for life from Wests Tigers functions ===
In August 2024, it was revealed that Hopoate had been banned for life from Wests Tigers functions after allegedly abusing one of the game's senior officials. It was reported that Hopoate allegedly abused and threatened NSWRL chief executive David Trodden. Club CEO Shane Richardson spoke to the media following the alleged incident saying "It was disgraceful and he's not welcome at Tigers functions in the future".

== Boxing career ==
With the termination of his Sea Eagles contract effectively bringing to an end his days of playing rugby league, Hopoate announced that he would begin training in an attempt to undertake a career in professional boxing.

On 17 May 2006, he fought in his first professional boxing bout, on the undercard of the Anthony Mundine and Danny Green fight. Hopoate won his debut after only 47 seconds of the opening round, knocking out Frank "The Big Ship" Faasolo.

After the quick victory, Hopoate challenged former professional rugby league footballer Mark Geyer to a fight, citing his reasons as being "I know he hates being bagged, but for him to go sit behind a magazine and bag other players, I don't like that". Geyer turned down the challenge on the NRL Footy Show the following week.

Instead, he followed up against New Zealand fighter Alex Mene on 4 August, whom he defeated with a somewhat controversial fourth round technical knockout after the referee called a halt to the bout.

Hopoate's third fight was against Ipswich Brothers and former Gold Coast Seagulls rugby league prop forward Anthony Fowler. The pair had previously fought during an under-17 representative match 15 years earlier, but Fowler found little opportunity to trade blows with Hopoate as he was left motionless on the canvas after just 34 seconds of his only professional boxing appearance.

Subsequently, he defeated two more heavyweights from New Zealand during bouts in Queensland. Hopoate first put a finish to one-sided event against Oscar Talemaira with a first-round technical knockout on 17 November. He then knocked out Hiriwa Te Rangi on 24 February 2007 after a stiffer contest that lasted five rounds, his longest fight to date.

Hopoate then moved to a 6–0 record by dispatching the heavy-hitting Richard "Tootin'" Tutaki with a series of second round body-blows on 7 March 2007 at the Sydney Entertainment Centre, again on an Anthony Mundine undercard. Lovemore N'dou, the IBF junior welterweight champion, said after watching the bout that Hopoate is an embarrassment to the sport of boxing, and that he was disgusted with what he saw. As part of his scathing criticism of Hopoate, as well as Willie Mason's older brother Les, N'dou said: "Footballers like them thinking they can box turns what is a scientific and artistic sport into a circus. They are making fools out of themselves and fools out of a sport I love. I despise them and everything they stand for".

On 30 March 2007, Hopoate experienced his first defeat, which came by Brian Fitzgerald. The result, a split decision after six rounds, proved controversial and inspired Hopoate to say, "I'm being vilified again. It obviously has something to do with my playing days. I know I'm going to be 'John Hopoate' for the rest of my life. But I've tried to take a new road and I thought I was going along good, until this. They are racist cause I'm from Tonga, it's not bloody right. I never get a fair go from Aussies".

On 13 April 2007, Hopoate suffered his second straight loss, inflicted by former national kickboxing champion, Ben Edwards, who was making his professional boxing debut. Hopoate's performance, which was brought to an abrupt end by technical knockout after just 90 seconds of the first round, was jeered and ridiculed by the 200-odd paying spectators, several of whom were seen to throw plastic beer cups in the direction of Hopoate. With three further bouts scheduled before July, he aimed to continue his career. However, following his earlier criticism, Lovemore N'dou has commented that Hopoate needs to "learn to fight properly", as well as the more inflammatory "Hoppa should stop putting his finger up other guys anuses "; however, has now offered to help him out at no charge.

On 10 September 2008, Hopoate became Australian heavyweight boxing champion. The Sydney fighter finished defending champion Bob Mirovic deep into the ninth round of an epic bout at the Gold Coast convention centre.

Hopoate cornered "The Big Bear" Mirovic and hit him with more than six clean punches to knock the 42-year-old to the floor. Mirovic got to his feet but his trainer Jeff Fenech threw in the towel to end the fight.

After the title fight, controversy ensued, Mirovic claiming that Hopoate used illegal tactics during the bout which resulted in Mirovic having his arm broken. Mirovic believes he was illegally shoved to the ground in the sixth round, which left him with a broken arm and no hope of carrying on."I couldn't throw a punch for the final three rounds because of what Hoppa did," Mirovic said.

"I'd cop it on the chin if I lost the fight fair and square, but there's no way I'll sit back if something illegal was done to me. It was a dog act by Hoppa. I can't do anything now for three months and I'm demanding Hoppa doesn't fight anybody else until he gives me a rematch."

He fought Cliff Couser on 20 March 2009 and won the fight by technical knockout after Couser did not answer the bell for the fourth round.

Hopoate fought Oliver McCall on 22 May 2009 for the International Boxing Association (IBA) Intercontinental heavyweight title in a fight which he lost by second-round technical knockout after being knocked down twice in the fight.

He fought Bob Mirovic again on 23 July 2009, beating him on points after a gruelling 10-round match.

Hopoate fought Colin Wilson on 10 October 2009, on the undercard of the David Tua and Shane Cameron fight. Hopoate started the fight well scoring a knock down in the third round, before Colin Wilson came back from the knock down to knock Hopoate down late in the same round. Wilson went on to win the fight knocking Hopoate out in the fourth round.

Hopoate then fought Shane Cameron on 20 March 2010, losing the fight by disqualification in the second round after Hopoate wrestled with Cameron and tried throwing him to the ground more than he tried throwing punches.

On 20 December 2018, Hopoate agreed to return to the ring to fight Cronulla player Paul Gallen with the match being scheduled for 9 February 2019. Hopoate was knocked out in the second round of the bout. He said afterwards "I got caught by a good punch and I can’t hide from that, I went to sleep and fell over".

== Professional boxing record ==
| 20 fights | 12 wins | 8 losses |
|---|---|---|
| By knockout | 11 | 6 |
| By decision | 1 | 2 |

== Criminal charges ==
In December 2010, Hopoate was charged with assault occasioning actual bodily harm and affray following an incident at the Trademark Hotel in Kings Cross, New South Wales, where he worked. Hopoate was employed as a Responsible Service of Alcohol marshall and not for security.

In August 2013, Hopoate pleaded guilty to intimidating a parking officer outside the Trademark Hotel in June 2013. He was fined $400 over the incident.

In May 2016, Hopoate was arrested and charged with common assault after an incident involving an employee of a Crows Nest supermarket. Hopoate subsequently pleaded guilty. He was sentenced to a $1500 fine and an 18-month good behaviour bond.

In January 2025, Hopoate was charged by police after being caught driving with a disqualified licence. In May 2025, Hopoate avoided jail over the incident.

Awards and achievements
| Preceded by Bob Mirovic | Australian heavyweight Championship | Succeeded by Colin Wilson |
