= Jamil Hopoate =

Australian professional rugby league footballer

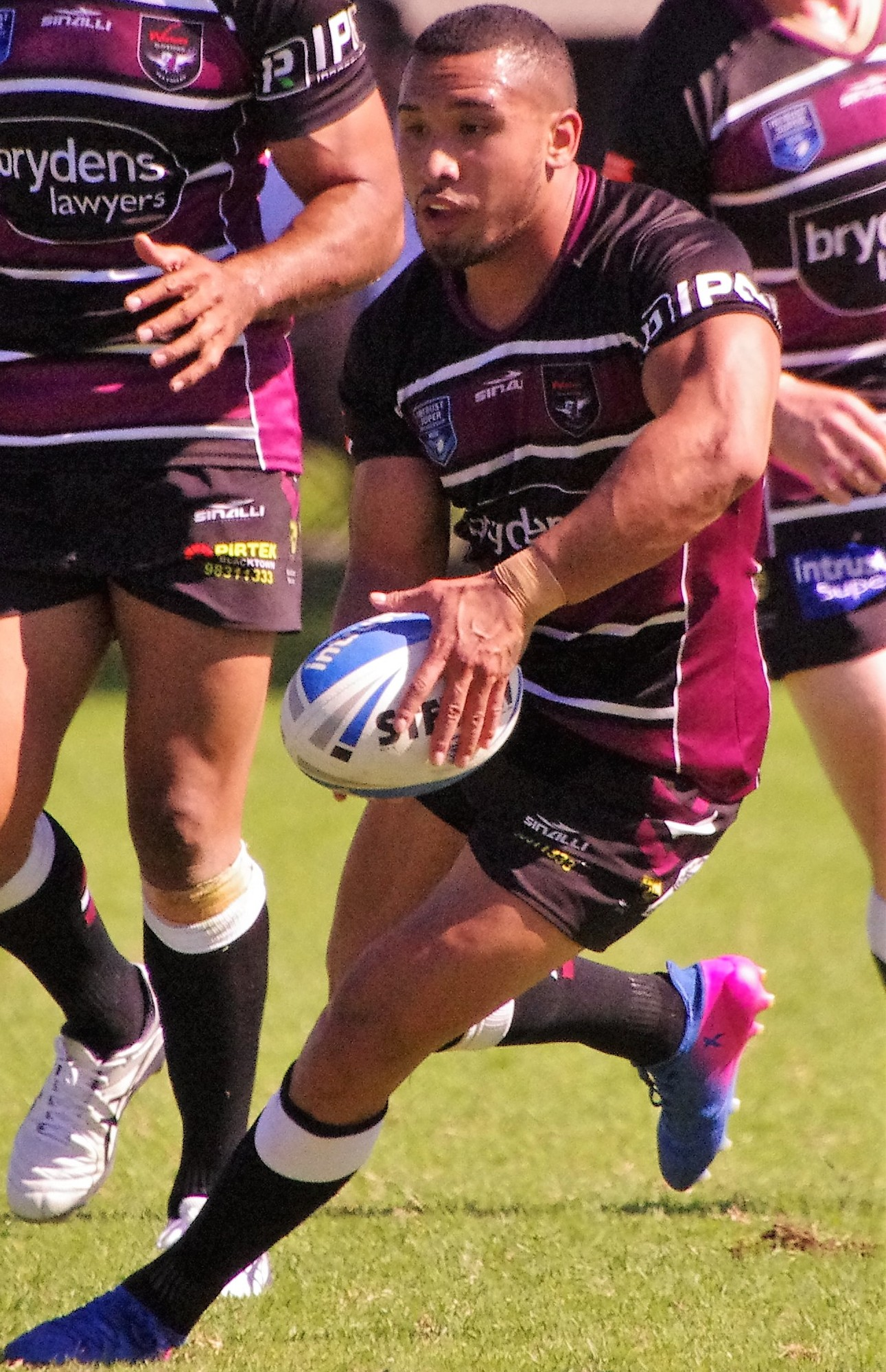

Personal information
- Born: 8 November 1994 (age 32) Manly, New South Wales, Australia
- Height: 180 cm (5 ft 11 in)
- Weight: 93 kg (14 st 9 lb)

Playing information
- Position: Second-row
Club
Years	Team	Pld	T	G	FG	P
2020	Brisbane Broncos	12	0	0	0	0
- Source: As of 9 March 2021
- Father: John Hopoate
- Relatives: William Hopoate (brother); Albert Hopoate (brother); Lehi Hopoate (brother); Albert Hopoate (uncle); Tony Francis (cousin)

Jamil Hopoate (born 8 November 1994) is an Australian former professional rugby league footballer and convicted criminal who played as a second-row forward for the Brisbane Broncos in the National Rugby League (NRL).

== Background ==
He was born and raised in Manly, New South Wales and is of Tongan descent. He is the son of former Manly-Warringah Sea Eagles player John Hopoate and younger brother of rugby league player William Hopoate.

== Playing career ==
Hopoate made his debut in round 1 of the 2020 NRL season for the Brisbane Broncos vs North Queensland Cowboys starting from the bench.

Hopoate played 12 games for Brisbane in the 2020 NRL season as they finished last on the table for the first time in the club's history.

Hopoate was released by Brisbane Broncos at the end of the 2020 season.

== Convictions ==
In 2012, Hopoate was sacked by Parramatta due to a string of off-field incidents which included a mid-range drink driving conviction.

In 2014, Hopoate was jailed for one year and given a two-year good behaviour bond after a violent assault on two men at a Sydney pub. Hopoate was later sacked by his club Manly-Warringah over the incident.

In December 2020, Hopoate was charged with two counts of domestic violence-related assault, one count of assault, two counts of intimidation with intent to cause fear of physical or mental harm, and one count each of driving while his licence was suspended and mid-range drink-driving. In October 2021, he was sentenced to a 12-month intensive corrections order under which he must abstain from alcohol and undertake 250 hours of community service. He also has to pay $2100 in fines for the driving offences.

In May 2021, Hopoate was charged with large-scale commercial drug supply. He pleaded guilty in May 2022. He and Leanne Mofoa, who was charged as an accessory after the fact, were sentenced on 20 October. Hopoate was given maximum jail time of three years and nine months, and was released in October 2024. Mofoa was sentenced to an 18-month intensive corrections order in the community.

In September 2026, Hopoate was arrested after allegedly crashing into a parked car in Curl Curl on Sydney's Northern Beaches, and was also said to have returned a positive roadside breath test, a month after he was charged including drink driving offences, Hopoate was detained after a half-naked rampage along Brookvale, he was later taken to Northern Beaches Hospital where he's undergoing mental health assessment.
