= New South Wales Under-16's rugby league team =

New South Wales Under-16
Team information
- Nickname: Blues
- Governing body: New South Wales Rugby League
- Head coach: Scott Jones
- Captain: Jaron Purcell (2017)
- Home stadium: ANZ Stadium (83,500)

Uniforms
First colours

Team results
- First game
- New South Wales 30–16 Queensland (ANZ Stadium, Sydney; 21 May 2008)
- Biggest win
- New South Wales 30–0 Queensland (ANZ Stadium, Sydney; 5 June 2013)
- Biggest defeat
- New South Wales 10–30 Queensland (Etihad Stadium, Melbourne; 3 June 2009)

The New South Wales Under-16's rugby league team, also known as New South Wales Under-16s or New South Wales U16, represents New South Wales in the sport of rugby league at an under-16 age level. Since 2008, the team has played an annual fixture against the Queensland Under-16s team as a curtain-raiser to a State of Origin game. The team features players selected from New South Wales's premier under-16 rugby league competition, the Harold Matthews Cup and Andrew Johns Cup. The New South Wales Rugby League administered them.

== History ==
Prior to 2008, junior interstate matches were contested at under-17 and under-19 levels. In 2008, with the advent of the National Youth Competition, the age levels switched to an under-16 and under-18 format to keep in line with the NSWRL's existing S.G. Ball Cup and Harold Matthews Cup competitions and the QRL's Mal Meninga Cup and Cyril Connell Cup competitions, which would begin in 2009.

New South Wales saw success in the first under-16 Origin fixture in 2008. They recorded their first defeat a year later, losing 30-10 in 2009 at Etihad Stadium. From 2010 to 2013, New South Wales would win four games consecutively before losing both fixtures against Queensland in 2014 and 2015. Since 2015, New South Wales has won every under-16 Origin fixture in 2016, 2017 and 2018.

== Players ==
Players selected for the New South Wales under-16 team are usually contracted with a National Rugby League (NRL) side and, until 2017, played in the Harold Matthews Cup. Occasionally players, who are contracted to Queensland-based NRL sides who play in the Cyril Connell Cup, are selected. Each pre-season, the New South Wales Rugby League will select an under-16 squad featuring players in contention for the mid-season fixture.

== Results ==
=== 2008 ===
Played as a curtain raiser to Game I of the 2008 State of Origin series.

21 May 2008

New South Wales U16	30–16	Queensland U16
Tries; Jacob Miller 2 William Hopoate 1 Vaipuna Tia Kilifi 1 Jason Wehbe 1 Goals; Jason Wehbe 3 Harry Siejka 2	Report	Tries; Josh Batilabasi 1 Benn Malley 1 Korbin Sims 1 Goals; Mitchell Frei 2

ANZ Stadium, Sydney

New South Wales Under-16
2008 team		Coaching staff
1 William HOPOATE – FB; 2 Chris ULUGIA – WG; 3 John PEPA – CE; 4 Jacob MILLER – CE; 5 Jacob GAGAN – WG; 6 Tyler RANDELL – FE; 7 Harry SIEKJA – HB; 8 Jack STOCKWELL – PR; 9 Ben PICKER – HK; 10 Matt GROAT – PR; 11 Lachlan BURR – SR; 12 Alex MCKINNON – SR; 13 Vaipuna TIA KILIFI – LK	14 Blake PHILLIPS – UT; 15 Jason WEHBE – UT; 16 Jack LEE HANG – UT; 17 Rodney MOEFAAUO – UT	Legend: (c) Captain(s); (vc) Vice-captain(s); Updated: 19 July 2018; Source(s): NYCDB

=== 2009 ===
Played as a curtain raiser to Game I of the 2009 State of Origin series.

3 June 2009

New South Wales U16	10–30	Queensland U16
Tries; Jordan Malaki 1 Ryan Wilson 1 Goals; Sam Short 1	Report	Tries; Mitch Ardler 2 Luke Abdul-Rahman 1 Rian Diffey 1 Andrew Shipway 1 Jordan Tighe 1 Goals; Sam Foster 3

Etihad Stadium, Melbourne
Referee: Nick Morel

New South Wales Under-16
2009 team		Coaching staff
1 James ROBERTS – FB; 2 Ryan WILSON – WG; 3 Vai TOUTAI – CE; 4 Simon LIENESCH – CE; 5 David NOFOALUMA – WG; 6 Jack WIGHTON – FE; 7 Sam SHORT (c) – HB; 8 Nick CROMPTON – PR; 9 Adam CLYDSDALE – HK; 10 David KLEMMER – PR; 11 David MINUTE – SR; 12 Reece DAVIDSON – SR; 13 Brenden SANTI – LK	14 Kyle LOVETT – UT; 15 Jordan MALAKI – UT; 16 Francis KATOA – UT; 17 Jake TOWNSEND – UT	Head coach: Craig Sandercock; Legend: (c) Captain(s); (vc) Vice-captain(s); Updated: 19 July 2018; Source(s): NYCDB

=== 2010 ===
Played as a curtain raiser to Game III of the 2010 State of Origin series.

7 July 2010

New South Wales U16	24–14	Queensland U16
Tries; Robbie Kamoto 1 Tyrone Phillips 1 Kelepi Tanginoa 1 Joshua Walker 1 Goals; Clinton Gutherson 4	Report	Tries; Anthony Milford 2 Jordan Dulay 1 Goals; Scott Doyle 1

ANZ Stadium, Sydney
Referee: Jon Stone

New South Wales Under-16
2010 team		Coaching staff
1 Tyrone PHILLIPS – FB; 2 Clinton GUTHERSON – WG; 3 Joshua WALKER – CE; 4 Alan NIULESA – CE; 5 Richard KENNAR – WG; 6 Jack BIRD – FE; 7 Shannon CROOK – HB; 8 Jake TRBOJEVIC – PR; 9 Fabian NATOLI – HK; 10 Frazer MASINAMUA – PR; 11 Kelepi TANGINOA – SR; 12 Jake LAWRENCE – SR; 13 Bryce CARTWRIGHT – LK	14 Robbie KAMOTO – UT; 15 Chad McGILL – UT; 16 Jakiel MARINER – UT; 17 Wiki TUAVAO – UT	Head coach: Tony HERMAN; Legend: (c) Captain(s); (vc) Vice-captain(s); Updated: 19 July 2018; Source(s): NYCDB

=== 2011 ===
Played as a curtain raiser to Game I of the 2011 State of Origin series.

25 May 2011

Queensland U16	16–18	New South Wales U16
Tries; Jack Anderson 1 Luke Bateman 1 Ryan Mitchell 1 Goals; Duncan Paia'aua 2	Report	Tries; Bradley Deitz 1 John Fomai 1 Dylan Russell 1 Goals; Brendan Cox 2 Dee Jay Harris 1

Suncorp Stadium, Brisbane

New South Wales Under-16
2011 team		Coaching staff
1 Dylan RUSSELL – FB; 2 Alex JOHNSTON – WG; 3 Dee Jay HARRIS – CE; 4 Michael MORGAN – CE; 5 John FOMAI – WG; 6 Drew HUTCHISON – FE; 7 Brendan COX – HB; 8 Matthew LODGE – PR; 9 Bradley DEITZ – HK; 10 Jake KAMIRE – PR; 11 Blake HARRISON – SR; 12 Tepai MOEROA – SR; 13 Jack BIRD – LK	14 Zach DOCKAR-CLAY – UT; 15 Addison DEMETRIOU – UT; 16 Brett SOLOMON – UT; 17 Euan AITKEN – UT	Legend: (c) Captain(s); (vc) Vice-captain(s); Updated: 19 July 2018; Source(s): NYCDB

=== 2012 ===
Played as a curtain raiser to Game I of the 2012 State of Origin series.

23 May 2012

New South Wales U16	30–16	Queensland U16
Tries; Travis Edwards 1 Robert Jennings 1 Dillon Khoury 1 Tevita Pangai 1 David Sheridan 1 Alex Twal 1 Goals; Jackson Hastings 3	Report	Tries; Cooper Bambling 1 Simione Fatafehi 1 Sam Smith 1 Goals; Sheldon Bobbert 2

Etihad Stadium, Melbourne
Referee: Mick Laverty

New South Wales Under-16
2012 team		Coaching staff
1 Dillon KHOURY – FB; 2 Izaac THOMPSON – WG; 3 Robert JENNINGS – CE; 4 Sione MATA’UTIA – CE; 5 David SHERIDAN – WG; 6 Bayley SIRONEN – FE; 7 Travis EDWARDS – HB; 8 Soni HALA – PR; 9 Jackson HASTINGS – HK; 10 Alex TWAL – PR; 11 Tevita PANGAI JUNIOR – SR; 12 Tyrell FUIMAONO – SR; 13 Mark McCORMACK – LK	14 Oliver CLARK – UT; 15 Jacob HOST – UT; 16 Jamie HILL – UT; 17 Beau PARRY – UT	Head coach: Glen VANDERWERT; Legend: (c) Captain(s); (vc) Vice-captain(s); Updated: 19 July 2018; Source(s): NYCDB

=== 2013 ===
Played as a curtain raiser to Game I of the 2013 State of Origin series.

5 June 2013

New South Wales U16	30–0	Queensland U16
Tries; Jesse Ramien 2 Jack Cogger 1 Gabe Hamlin 1 Latrell Mitchell 1 Reimis Smith 1 Goals; Brock Lamb 3	Report

ANZ Stadium, Sydney
Referee: Ziggy Przeklasa-Adamski

New South Wales Under-16
2013 team		Coaching staff
1 Latrell MITCHELL – FB; 2 Mark GRIFFITHS – WG; 3 Jesse RAMIEN – CE; 4 Reimis SMITH – CE; 5 Robbie GRAHAM – WG; 6 Brock LAMB – FE; 7 Michael DOOLAN – HB; 8 Gabriel HAMLIN – PR; 9 Joey TRAMONTANA (c) – HK; 10 Pifeleti PIFELETI – PR; 11 Nat BUTCHER – SR; 12 Simon FONUA – SR; 13 Ethan ROBERTS – LK	14 Ray STONE – UT; 15 Jack COGGER – UT; 16 Ryan KING – UT; 17 Blake LAWRIE – UT	Head coach: David HOWLETT; Legend: (c) Captain(s); (vc) Vice-captain(s); Updated: 19 July 2018; Source(s): NYCDB

=== 2014 ===
Played as a curtain raiser to Game I of the 2014 State of Origin series.

28 May 2014

Queensland U16	20–18	New South Wales U16
Tries; Jason Chapman 1 Sato Ketia Opo 1 Syd Smith 1 Enari Tuala 1 Goals; Steven Tatipata 2	Report	Tries; Sione Hopoate 1 Cameron Murray 1 Katoni Staggs 1 Goals; Brendan O'Hagan 3

Suncorp Stadium, Queensland

New South Wales Under-16
2014 team		Coaching staff
1 Matt COOPER – FB; 2 Nick COTRIC – WG; 3 Sione HOPOATE – CE; 4 Jessie ABBOTT – CE; 5 Katoni STAGGS – WG; 6 Hosea LEUEA – FE; 7 Brendan O’HAGAN – HB; 8 Emre GULER – PR; 9 Tom STARLING – HK; 10 Brodie JONES – PR; 11 Kurtis DARK – SR; 12 Jai WHITBREAD – SR; 13 Cameron MURRAY – LK	14 Ryan PAPENHUYZEN – UT; 15 Giordan PATEA – UT; 16 Jack CROSS – UT; 17 Dion SOLAESE – UT	Head coach: Dean YOUNG & Ben HORNBY; Legend: (c) Captain(s); (vc) Vice-captain(s); Updated: 19 July 2018; Source(s): NYCDB

=== 2015 ===
Played as a curtain raiser to Game I of the 2015 State of Origin series.

27 May 2015

New South Wales U16	6–10	Queensland U16
Tries; Campbell Graham 1 Goals; Luke Metcalf 1	Report	Tries; Nathan Barrett 1 Travis Turnbull 1 Goals; Travis Turnbull 1

ANZ Stadium, Sydney
Referee: Daniel Olford

New South Wales Under-16
2015 team		Coaching staff
1 Dylan SMITH – FB; 2 Ethan PARRY – WG; 3 Tuimavave AFUALO – CE; 4 Campbell GRAHAM – CE; 5 Sebastian KRIS – WG; 6 Luke METCALF – FE; 7 Alex SEVE – HB; 8 Matt CROKER – PR; 9 Josh COOK – HK; 10 Payne HAAS – PR; 11 Jaeman SALMON – SR; 12 Josh CURRAN – SR; 13 Lachlan SMITH – LK	14 Zac LOMAX – UT; 15 PJ VAIGALU – UT; 16 Rocky TOGATUKI – UT; 17 Brandon WAKEHAM – UT	Head coach: Danny BUDERUS; Legend: (c) Captain(s); (vc) Vice-captain(s); Updated: 19 July 2018; Source(s): NYCDB

=== 2016 ===
Played as a curtain raiser to Game I of the 2016 State of Origin series.

1 June 2016

New South Wales U16	12 - 10	Queensland U16
Tries; William Kei 1 Bronson Xerri 1 Goals; Jock Madden 2	Report	Tries; Dejzha Pene 1 Jonathan Siofele 1 Goals; Cory Paix 1

ANZ Stadium, Sydney
Referee: Todd Smith

New South Wales Under-16
2016 team		Coaching staff
1 John Paul NOHRA – FB; 2 William KEI – WG; 3 Bronson XERRI – CE; 4 Max LEHMANN – CE; 5 Cliff LEA’AETOA – WG; 6 Jock MADDEN – FE; 7 Phoenix CROSSLAND – HB; 8 Matthew DRAGISIC – PR; 9 Kyle SCHNEIDER (c) – HK; 10 Franklin PELE – PR; 11 Shawn BLORE – SR; 12 Mateo TATOLA – SR; 13 Brock GARDNER – LK	14 Isaac LONGMUIR – UT; 15 Tom BAKER – UT; 16 Lindsay SMITH – UT; 17 Egan BUTCHER – UT	Head coach: Brad FITTLER; Legend: (c) Captain(s); (vc) Vice-captain(s); Updated: 19 July 2018; Source(s): NYCDB

=== 2017 ===
Played as a curtain raiser to Game III of the 2017 State of Origin series.

12 July 2017

Queensland U16	16 - 22	New South Wales U16
Tries; Alofiana Khan-Pereira 2 Will Evans 1 Goals; Ezra Coulston 2	Report	Tries; Bradman Best 1 Blake Dowel 1 Cooper Jenkins 1 Aaron Schoupp 1 Goals; Aaron Schoupp 3

Suncorp Stadium, Brisbane
Referee: Dan Munroe

New South Wales Under-16
2017 team		Coaching staff
3 Bradman BEST – FB; 2 Cooper JENKINS – WG; 14 Tyler FIELD – CE; 4 Aaron SCHOUPP – CE; 5 Max FEAGAI – WG; 6 Kaeo WEEKES – FE; 7 Thomas DEMEIO – HB; 8 Samuel HUGHES – PR; 9 Jed EDWARDS – HK; 10 Filimaua FILIMAUA-TAU – PR; 11 Ben TRBOJEVIC – SR; 12 Josh SCHUSTER – SR; 13 Jaron PURCELL (c) – LK	1 Albert HOPOATE – UT; 15 David HOLLIS – UT; 16 Harry CROKER – UT; 17 Blake DOWEL – UT	Head coach: Brad FITTLER; Legend: (c) Captain(s); (vc) Vice-captain(s); Updated: 19 July 2018; Source(s): NYCDB

=== 2018 ===
Played as a curtain raiser to the Round 18 Brisbane Broncos-Warriors game.

15 July 2018

Queensland U16	14 - 28	New South Wales U16
Tries; Tyrone Sa'u 1 Keegan Vandenberg 1 Reece Walsh 1 Goals; Reece Walsh 1	Report	Tries; Thomas Cant 1 Noah Griffiths 1 Viliami Penisini 1 Zion Tauasa 1 Kaeo Weekes 1 Goals; Donovan Boney 4

Suncorp Stadium, Brisbane
Referee: Jordan Morel

New South Wales Under-16
2018 team		Coaching staff
1 Donovan BONEY – FB; 2 Junior TUPOU – WG; 3 Zion TAUASA – CE; 4 Viliami PENISINI – CE; 5 Matthew KOMOLAFE – WG; 6 Kaeo WEEKES – FE; 7 Noah GRIFFITHS – HB; 8 Trey MOONEY – PR; 9 – HK; 10 Tyreece MATANGI – PR; 11 Thomas CANT – SR; 15 Uinitoni MATAELE – SR; 13 Caleb TOHI – LK	14 Jack WILLIAMS – UT; 16 Peter TAATEO – UT; 17 Clay WEBB – UT; 18 Josh BEVAN – UT	Head coach: Scott JONES; Legend: (c) Captain(s); (vc) Vice-captain(s); Updated: 19 July 2018; Source(s): NYCDB

== See also ==
- New South Wales State team
- New South Wales Residents team
- New South Wales Women's team
- New South Wales Under-20 team
- New South Wales Under-18 team
- Harold Matthews Cup
- New South Wales Rugby League
- Country Rugby League
