= New South Wales Under-18's rugby league team =

New South Wales Under-18
Team information
- Nickname: Blues
- Governing body: New South Wales Rugby League
- Head coach: Mark O’Meley
- Captain: Phoenix Crossland
- Home stadium: ANZ Stadium (83,500)

Uniforms
First colours

Team results
- First game
- New South Wales 34–12 Queensland (Suncorp Stadium, Brisbane; 11 June 2008)
- Biggest win
- New South Wales 56–6 Queensland (Suncorp Stadium, Sydney; 26 June 2013)
- Biggest defeat
- Queensland 24–18 New South Wales (ANZ Stadium, Sydney; 4 July 2012)

The New South Wales Under-18's rugby league team, also known as New South Wales Under-18's or New South Wales U18, represents New South Wales in the sport of rugby league at an under-18 age level. Between 2008 and 2019, the team played an annual fixture against the Queensland Under-18's team as a curtain raiser to a State of Origin game. The team featured players selected from New South Wales's premier under-18 rugby league competition, the S.G. Ball Cup. They were administered by the New South Wales Rugby League.

== History ==
Interstate matches at an under-18 level were played between 1978 and 1985. The contests were expanded to two age groups in 1986 and three in 1987, with further changes in 1988 and 1989. From 1990 to 2007, two junior interstate matches were contested at under-17 and under-19 levels. In 2006, a New South Wales under-18 team was selected to play two matches in Auckland, New Zealand.

In 2008, with the advent of the National Youth Competition, the age levels switched to an under-16 and under-18 format to keep in line with the NSWRL's existing Harold Matthews Cup and SG Ball Cup competitions and the QRL's Cyril Connell Cup and Mal Meninga Cup competitions, which began in 2009.

New South Wales saw success in the first four under-18 Origin fixtures in this second stint, winning every game until 2012. New South Wales would win another two more fixtures in 2013 and 2014 before picking up their second loss in 2015, losing to Queensland 22-18 at the Melbourne Cricket Ground. New South Wales won each under-18 Origin fixture from 2016 to 2018. Queensland won in 2019.

Age group interstate matches were not played in 2020 due to lockdown restrictions introduced to mitigate the COVID-19 pandemic in Australia. In 2021, the age groups for Harold Matthews Cup and SG Ball Cup competitions were respectively changed from under-16 to under-17 and from under-18 to under-19. An under-19 State of Origin men's match was scheduled for 14 July 2021 but this was cancelled. Under-19 State of Origin men's matches have been held since 2022, alongside an Under 19 women's match.

== Players ==
Players selected for the New South Wales under-18 team are usually contracted with a National Rugby League (NRL) side but play in either the S.G. Ball Cup, Holden Cup or Intrust Super Premiership competitions. Each pre-season the New South Wales Rugby League will select an under-18 squad featuring players in contention for the mid-season fixture.

=== Notable players ===
Since 2008, fifteen former New South Wales under-18 players have gone onto represent New South Wales at State of Origin level:

- Josh Dugan
- Wade Graham
- William Hopoate
- Aaron Woods
- David Klemmer
- Jake Trbojevic
- Jack Bird
- Latrell Mitchell
- Tom Trbojevic
- Nick Cotric
- Payne Haas
- Cameron Murray
- Jack Wighton
- Dale Finucane
- Clint Gutherson

== Results ==
=== 2008 ===
Played as a curtain raiser to Game II of the 2008 State of Origin series.

11 June 2008

Queensland U18	12 – 34	New South Wales U18
Tries; Gerard Beale 1 Pat O'Hanlon 1 Goals; Jordan Rankin 2	Report	Tries; Matthew Wright 3 Lachlan Coote 1 Albert Kelly 1 Mitchel Johnson 1 Goals; Lachlan Coote 5

Suncorp Stadium, Brisbane

New South Wales Under-18
2008 team		Coaching staff
1 Lachlan COOTE – FB; 2 Matthew WRIGHT – WG; 3 Jarrod CROKER] – CE; 4 Josh DUGAN – CE; 5 Peter MATA’UTIA – WG; 6 Albert KELLY – FE; 7 Wade GRAHAM – HB; 8 Mitchel JOHNSON – PR; 9 Liam HIGGINS – HK; 10 Tom HANCOCK – PR; 11 Tim AUREMI – SR; 12 Dominic WALSH – SR; 13 Matthew MUNDINE – LK	14 Nathan MASSEY – UT; 15 Mark NICHOLLS – UT; 16 Evrett VAURASI – UT; 17 James CUNNINGHAM – UT	Head coach: Joe GRIMA; Legend: (c) Captain(s); (vc) Vice-captain(s); Updated: 7 September 2018; Source(s): NYCDB

=== 2009 ===
Played as a curtain raiser to Game II of the 2009 State of Origin series.

24 June 2009

New South Wales U18	24 – 6	Queensland U18
Tries; Josh Portlock 2 Nathan Massey 1 Joseph Roqoko 1 Goals; Chad Townsend 4	Report	Tries; Michael Morgan 1 Goals; Jordan Rankin 1

ANZ Stadium, Sydney
Referee: Robert Brown

New South Wales Under-18
2009 team		Coaching staff
1 William HOPOATE – FB; 2 Nathan MASSEY – WG; 3 Josh PORTLOCK – CE; 4 Dylan FARRELL – CE; 5 Joseph ROKOQO – WG; 6 Albert KELLY – FE; 7 Chad TOWNSEND – HB; 8 Aaron WOODS – PR; 9 Cameron KING (c) – HK; 10 Jake FINN – PR; 11 Alex McKINNON (c) – SR; 12 Lachlan BURR – SR; 13 Dale FINUCANE – LK	14 Patrick POLITONI – UT; 15 Slade GRIFFIN – UT; 16 Dominic WALSH – UT; 17 Sam MARTIN – UT	Head coach: Joe GRIMA; Legend: (c) Captain(s); (vc) Vice-captain(s); Updated: 7 September 2018; Source(s): NYCDB

=== 2010 ===
Played as a curtain raiser to Game II of the 2010 State of Origin series.

16 June 2010

Queensland U18	18 – 22	New South Wales U18
Tries; Kirisome Auva'a 2 Lachlan Maranta 1 Aaron Whitchurch 1 Goals; Kyle Feldt 1		Tries; Lachlan Burr 1 Nathan Green 1 Alex McKinnon 1 Goals; Jacob Miller 5

Suncorp Stadium, Brisbane
Referee: Peter Gough

New South Wales Under-18
2010 team		Coaching staff
1 David NOFOALUMA – FB; 2 Jacob GAGAN – WG; 3 Nathan GREEN – CE; 4 Dale CLACHERTY – CE; 5 Brayden WILIAME – WG; 6 Cheyse BLAIR – FE; 7 Jacob MILLER – HB; 8 Matt GROAT – PR; 9 Ben PICKER – HK; 10 Jack STOCKWELL – PR; 11 Lachlan BURR – SR; 12 Alex McKINNON – SR; 13 Dane ATKINSON – LK	14 Gerard McCALLUM – UT; 15 Jacob LOKO – UT; 16 Shannon BOYD – UT; 17 Tom EISENHUTH – UT	Head coach: Peter GENTLE; Legend: (c) Captain(s); (vc) Vice-captain(s); Updated: 7 September 2018; Source(s): NYCDB

=== 2011 ===
Played as a curtain raiser to Game II of the 2011 State of Origin series.

15 June 2011

New South Wales U18	16 – 6	Queensland U18
Tries; Sam Coster 1 Michael Lichaa 1 Kyle Lovett 1 Goals; Curtis Sironen 2		Tries; Tautau Moga 1 Goals; Anthony Gadd 1

ANZ Stadium, Sydney

New South Wales Under-18
2011 team		Coaching staff
1 Nesiasi MATAITONGA – FB; 2 Jacob GAGAN – WG; 3 David NOFOALUMA – CE; 4 Vai TOUTAI – CE; 5 Pat MATA’UTIA – WG; 6 Curtis SIRONEN – FE; 7 Jack WIGHTON – HB; 8 David KLEMMER – PR; 9 Michael LICHAA – HK; 10 Leilani LATU – PR; 11 Kyle LOVETT – SR; 12 Jordan HALL – SR; 13 Ben ROOSE – LK	14 Tom ROUSE – UT; 15 Sam COSTER – UT; 16 Michael STEELE – UT; 17 Jake TRBOJEVIC – UT	Head coach: Craig SANDERCOCK; Legend: (c) Captain(s); (vc) Vice-captain(s); Updated: 7 September 2018; Source(s): NYCDB

=== 2012 ===
Played as a curtain raiser to Game III of the 2012 State of Origin series.

4 July 2012

New South Wales U18	18 – 24	Queensland U18
Tries; Mitchell Moses 1 Tyrone Phillips 1 Jake Trbojevic 1 Goals; Clinton Gutherson 3	Report	Tries; Caleb Timu 2 Luke Bateman 1 Patrick Kaufusi 1 Goals; Anthony Milford 4

ANZ Stadium, Sydney
Referee: Matt Noyen

New South Wales Under-18
2012 team		Coaching staff
1 Clinton GUTHERSON – FB; 2 Alex JOHNSTON – WG; 3 Aaron GRAY – CE; 4 Richard KENNAR – CE; 5 Tyrone PHILLIPS – WG; 6 Mitchell MOSES – FE; 7 Shannon CROOK – HB; 8 Frazer MASINAMUA – PR; 9 Manaia CHERRINGTON – HK; 10 Jake TRBOJEVIC – PR; 11 Kelepi TANGINOA – SR; 12 Danny FUALALO – SR; 13 Dean BRITT – LK	14 Bryce CARTWRIGHT – UT; 15 Pauli PAULI – UT; 16 Andrew CHARD – UT; 17 Matthew LODGE – UT	Head coach: Garth BRENNAN; Legend: (c) Captain(s); (vc) Vice-captain(s); Updated: 7 September 2018; Source(s): NYCDB

=== 2013 ===
Played as a curtain raiser to Game II of the 2013 State of Origin series.

26 June 2013

Queensland U18	6 – 56	New South Wales U18
Tries; Ellery Tusa 1 Goals; Jayden Nikorima 1	Report	Tries; Dallin Watene-Zelezniak 3 Jackson Hastings 2 Alex Johnston 2 Sione Mata'utia 2 Zach Dockar-Clay 1 Michael Morgan 1 Goals; Jackson Hastings 6

Suncorp Stadium, Brisbane
Referee: Michael Gordon

New South Wales Under-18
2013 team		Coaching staff
1 Dallin WATENE-ZELEZNIAK – FB; 2 Alex JOHNSTON – WG; 3 Euan AITKEN – CE; 4 Sione MATA’UTIA – CE; 5 Michael MORGAN – WG; 6 Drew HUTCHISON – FE; 7 Jackson HASTINGS – HB; 8 Oliver CLARK – PR; 9 Zach DOCKAR-CLAY – HK; 10 Fosio TATOLA – PR; 11 Willis MEEHAN – SR; 12 Tevita PANGAI JUNIOR – SR; 13 Jack BIRD – LK	14 Cheyne WHITELAW – UT; 15 Tyrell FUIMAONO – UT; 16 Liam KNIGHT – UT; 17 Rhys ARMSTRONG – UT	Head coach: Todd PAYTEN; Legend: (c) Captain(s); (vc) Vice-captain(s); Updated: 7 September 2018; Source(s): NYCDB

=== 2014 ===
Played as a curtain raiser to Game II of the 2014 State of Origin series.

18 June 2014

New South Wales U18	24 – 10	Queensland U18
Tries; Matthew Dufty 2 Lachlan Croker 1 Latrell Mitchell 1 Tom Trbojevic 1 Goals; Jackson Hastings 2	Report	Tries; Lindsay Collins 1 Kieran Duffin 1 Goals; Cooper Bambling 1

ANZ Stadium, Sydney
Referee: Liam Nicholls

New South Wales Under-18
2014 team		Coaching staff
1 Matthew DUFTY – FB; 2 Paul MOMIROVSKI – WG; 3 Sione MATA’UTIA – CE; 4 Tom TRBOJEVIC – CE; 5 Latrell MITCHELL – WG; 6 Jackson HASTINGS – FE; 7 Lachlan CROKER – HB; 8 Soni HALA – PR; 9 Grant GARVEY – HK; 10 Jacob HOST – PR; 11 Tyrell FUIMAONO – SR; 12 Tevita PANGAI JUNIOR – SR; 13 Hame SELE – LK	14 Tevita COTTRELL – UT; 15 Alex TWAL – UT; 16 Luciano LEILUA – UT; 17 Matthew JURD – UT	Head coach: Todd PAYTEN; Legend: (c) Captain(s); (vc) Vice-captain(s); Updated: 7 September 2018; Source(s): NYCDB

=== 2015 ===
Played as a curtain raiser to Game II of the 2015 State of Origin series.

17 June 2015

New South Wales U18	18 – 22	Queensland U18
Tries; Ryan Papenhuyzen 1 Curtis Scott 1 Reimis Smith 1 Goals; Brock Lamb 3	Report	Tries; Joshua Fauid 1 Tristan Hope 1 Thomas Mikaele 1 Jaydn Su'A 1 Goals; Joshua Fauid 3

MCG, Melbourne
Referee: Jarrod Cole

New South Wales Under-18
2015 team		Coaching staff
1 Ryan PAPENHUYZEN – FB; 2 Reimis SMITH – WG; 3 Curtis SCOTT – CE; 4 Jesse RAMIEN – CE; 5 Reuben GARRICK – WG; 6 Brock LAMB – FE; 7 Jack COGGER (c) – HB; 8 Daniel VASQUEZ – PR; 9 Daniel PECK – HK; 10 Blake LAWRIE – PR; 11 Brodie JONES – SR; 12 Ray STONE – SR; 13 Gabe HAMLIN – LK	14 Brock ILETT – UT; 15 Billy MAGOULIAS – UT; 16 Billy BAINBRIDGE – UT; 17 Sam ELLIOTT – UT	Head coach: Todd PAYTEN; Legend: (c) Captain(s); (vc) Vice-captain(s); Updated: 7 September 2018; Source(s): NYCDB

=== 2016 ===
Played as a curtain raiser to Game II of the 2016 State of Origin series.

22 June 2016

Queensland U18	0 – 26	New South Wales U18
	Report	Tries; Zac Lomax 2 Tui Afualo 1 Isaac Lumelume 1 Ryan Papenhuyzen 1 Samuel Radovu 1 Goals; Zac Lomax 1

Suncorp Stadium, Brisbane
Referee: Nick Pelgrave

New South Wales Under-18
2016 team		Coaching staff
1 Ryan PAPENHUYZEN – FB; 2 Isaac LUMELUME – WG; 3 Tui AFUALO – CE; 4 Nick COTRIC – CE; 5 Zac LOMAX – WG; 19 Dean BLORE – FE; 7 Sean O’SULLIVAN – HB; 8 Emre GULER – PR; 9 Reece ROBSON – HK; 10 Jai WHITBREAD – PR; 11 Cameron MURRAY (c) – SR; 12 Samuel RADOVU – SR; 13 Brodie JONES – LK	14 Tom STARLING – UT; 15 Pasami SAULO – UT; 16 Payne HAAS – UT; 17 Keaon KOLOAMATANGI – UT	Head coach: Brad FITTLER; Legend: (c) Captain(s); (vc) Vice-captain(s); Updated: 7 September 2018; Source(s): NYCDB

=== 2017 ===
Played as a curtain raiser to Game II of the 2017 State of Origin series.

21 June 2017

New South Wales U18	35 – 28	Queensland U18
Tries; Luke Metcalf 3 Sebastian Kris 2 Ethan Parry 1 Goals; Zac Lomax 5 Field Goals; Zac Lomax 1	Report	Tries; Logan Bayliss-Brow 1 Eddie Blacker 1 Ronaldo Mulitalo 1 Treymain Spry 1 Murray Taulagi 1 Goals; Travis Turnbull 4 Field Goals

ANZ Stadium, Sydney
Referee: Darian Furner

New South Wales Under-18
2017 team		Coaching staff
1 John FONUA – FB; 2 Sebastian KRIS – WG; 17 Teig WILTON – CE; 4 Zac LOMAX – CE; 5 Ethan PARRY – WG; 6 Jaeman SALMON – FE; 7 Luke METCALF – HB; 8 Oregon KAUFUSI – PR; 9 Kyle SCHNEIDER – HK; 10 Payne HAAS (c) – PR; 11 Filia UTOIKAMANU – SR; 15 Alex SEYFARTH – SR; 13 Lindsay SMITH – LK	3 Noel AUKAFOLAU – UT; 12 Josh CURRAN – UT; 14 Jake HAZARD – UT; 16 Duwayne FUIMAONO – UT	Head coach: Brad FITTLER; Legend: (c) Captain(s); (vc) Vice-captain(s); Updated: 7 September 2018; Source(s): NYCDB

=== 2018 ===
Played as a curtain raiser to Game I of the 2018 State of Origin series.

6 June 2018

New South Wales U18	16 – 10	Queensland U18
Tries: Bronson Xerri (45') 1 Jason Saab (55') 1 Stefano Utoikamanu (75') 1 Goals: Jock Madden 2/3 (47', 76')	1st: 0 – 6; 2nd: 16 – 4	Tries: 1 (13') Tino Fa'asuamaleaui; 1 (60') David Fifita; Goals: 1/2 Tanah Boyd (15')

MCG, Melbourne
Referee: Keiren Irons

New South Wales Under-18
2018 team		Coaching staff
1 John-Paul NOHRA – FB; 2 Jason SAAB – WG; 3 Bradman BEST – CE; 4 Bronson XERRI – CE; 5 Tallis ANGIANGA – WG; 6 Jock MADDEN – FE; 7 Phoenix CROSSLAND (c) – HB; 8 Spencer LENIU – PR; 9 Maurice TRINDALL – HK; 10 Stefano UTOIKAMANU – PR; 11 Egan BUTCHER – SR; 12 Shawn BLORE (c) – SR; 13 Duwayne FUIMAONO – LK	14 Tommy TALAU – UT; 15 Matthew DOOREY – UT; 16 Jalal BAZZAZ – UT; 18 Jaron PURCELL – UT	Head coach: Mark O’MELEY; Legend: (c) Captain(s); (vc) Vice-captain(s); Updated: 7 September 2018; Source(s): NYCDB

== See also ==
- New South Wales State team
- New South Wales Residents team
- New South Wales Women's team
- New South Wales Under-20 team
- New South Wales Under-16 team
- Australian Schoolboys team
- S.G. Ball Cup
- New South Wales Rugby League
- Country Rugby League
