= Albert Hopoate (rugby league, born 1985) =

Australian rugby league player

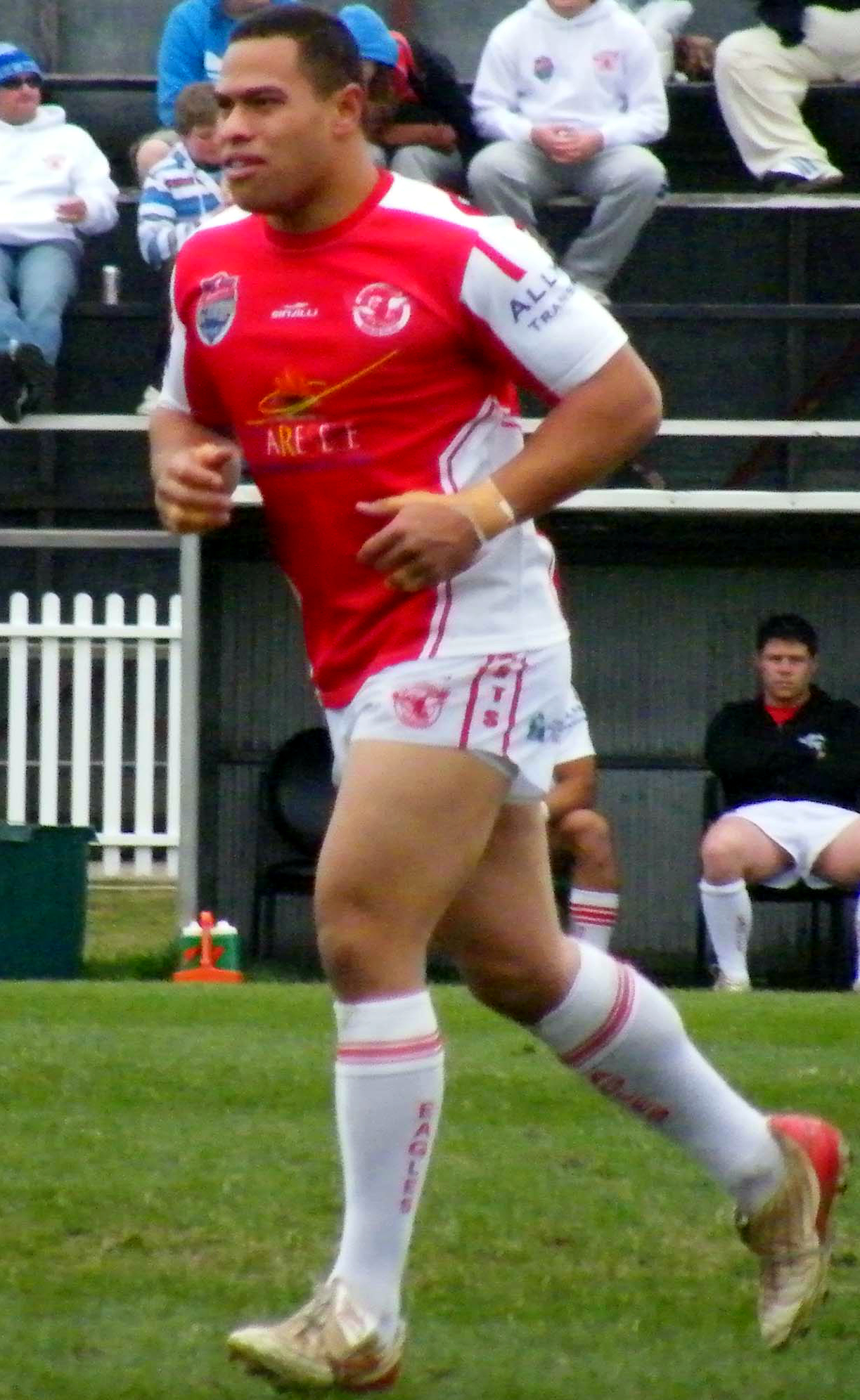

Personal information
- Born: 26 June 1985 (age 41) North Ryde, New South Wales, Australia
- Height: 183 cm (6 ft 0 in)
- Weight: 92 kg (14 st 7 lb)

Playing information
- Position: Centre
Club
Years	Team	Pld	T	G	FG	P
2008	Sydney Roosters
Representative
Years	Team	Pld	T	G	FG	P
	Tonga
- Relatives: John Hopoate (brother); William Hopoate (nephew); Jamil Hopoate (nephew); Lehi Hopoate (nephew); Albert Hopoate (nephew)

Albert Hopoate (born 26 June 1985 in North Ryde) is an Australian professional rugby league/union player who is currently contracted to the Penrith Emus in the NSW Shute Shield competition. He is the younger brother of controversial former international player John Hopoate.

Albert attended Eaglevale High School, where he made the Australian Schoolboys Rugby Union Team. He is a member of the Church of Jesus Christ of Latter-day Saints.

He was named in the Tonga training squad for the 2008 Rugby League World Cup. Like his brother John, he is also known by the nickname 'Hoppa'.
