= William Hopoate =

Tonga international rugby league footballer

Will Hopoate
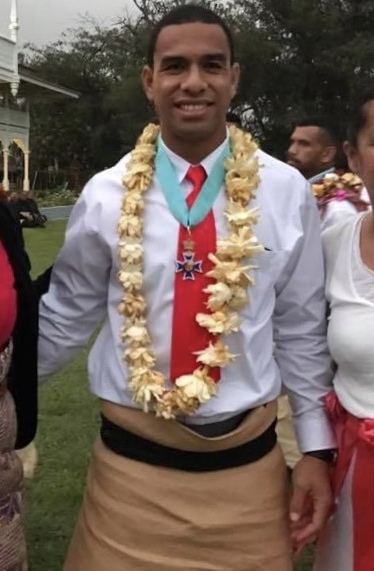

Personal information
- Full name: William Hopoate
- Born: 9 May 1992 (age 34) Manly, New South Wales, Australia

Playing information
- Height: 186 cm (6 ft 1 in)
- Weight: 98 kg (15 st 6 lb)
- Position: Centre, Fullback, Wing
Club
Years	Team	Pld	T	G	FG	P
2010–11	Manly Sea Eagles	22	14	0	0	56
2014–15	Parramatta Eels	38	7	0	0	28
2016–21	Canterbury Bulldogs	124	24	1	0	98
2022–23	St Helens	31	5	0	0	20
	Total	215	50	1	0	202
Representative
Years	Team	Pld	T	G	FG	P
2011–14	NSW City Origin	2	1	0	0	4
2011–15	New South Wales	5	1	0	0	4
2017–22	Tonga	13	4	0	0	16
- Father: John Hopoate
- Relatives: Albert Hopoate (brother); Jamil Hopoate (brother); Lehi Hopoate (brother); Albert Hopoate (uncle); Tony Francis (cousin)

William Hopoate (Tongan: Viliami Hopoate; born 9 May 1992) also known by the nickname of "Hoppa", is a former Tonga international rugby league footballer.

He played for the Manly Warringah Sea Eagles, Parramatta Eels and Canterbury Bankstown Bulldogs in the National Rugby League. Hopoate has also played for New South Wales City and New South Wales in the State of Origin series.

== Early life ==
Hopoate was born in Manly, New South Wales, Australia. He is of Tongan descent

He attended Cromer Campus and represented Australian Schoolboys rugby league team.

Hopoate is the son of former Australian international, John Hopoate.

== Club career ==
=== Manly Warringah Sea Eagles ===
He joined Manly's squads in 2009 at the age of 16 and played the entire year in the Sea Eagles Toyota Cup. He primarily played at fullback but also played on the wing and in the centres.

Despite a season-ending injury to Manly 1st-grade fullback Brett Stewart in Round 1 of the 2010 NRL season, Hopoate had to wait until Round 13 to make his debut as coach Des Hasler preferred to use Ben Farrar in the custodian role.

Hopoate is the son of former Manly player John Hopoate, though other than his physical size, speed, strength and general play, he has shown none of the "bad boy" habits which saw his father often on the sidelines through suspension. Hopoate also represented the Australian Schoolboys team.

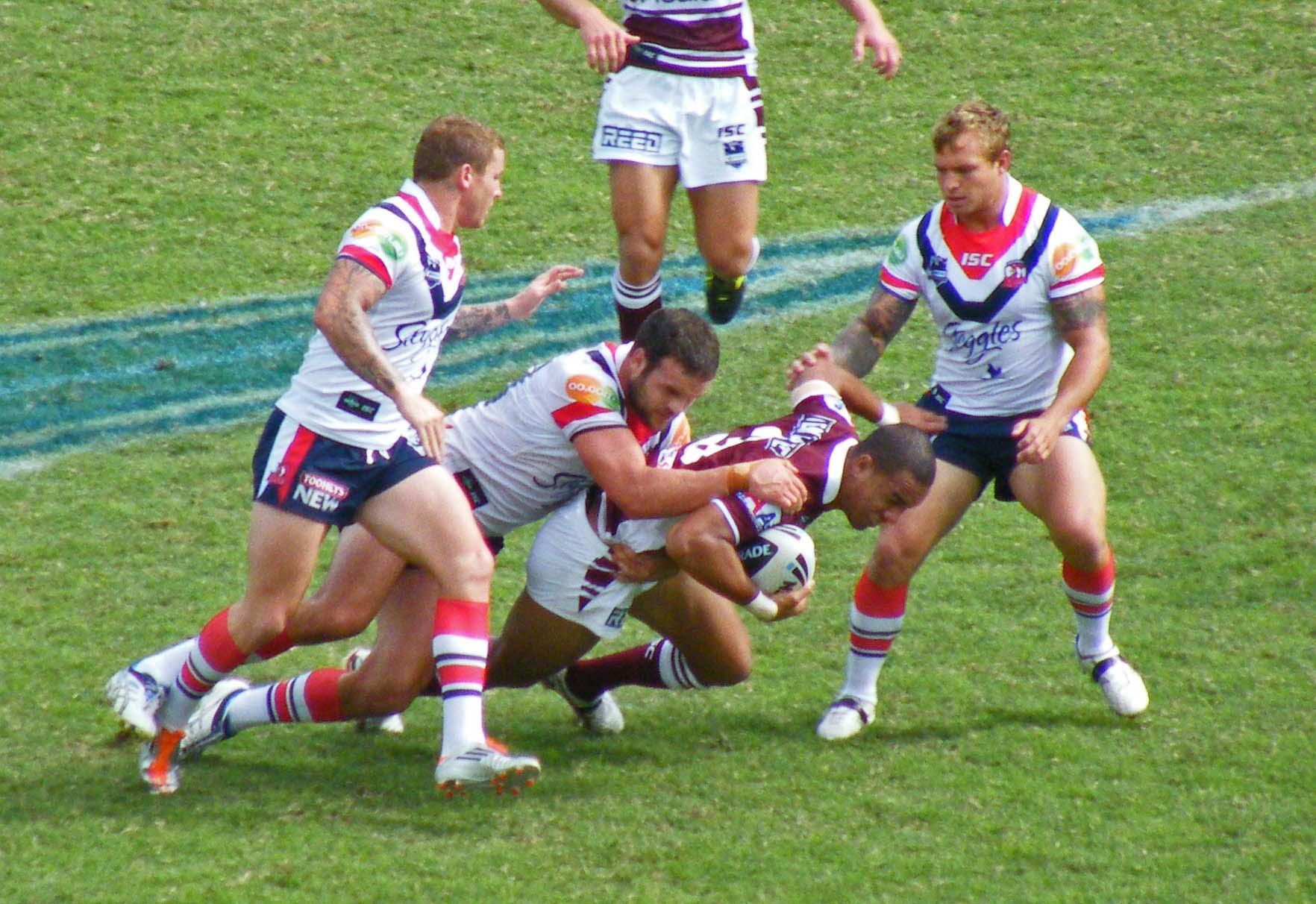
Hopoate playing for the Manly Sea Eagles against the Sydney Roosters in 2011

In Round 3 of the 2011 NRL season, Hopoate scored his first ever double against the Newcastle Knights at Brookvale Oval. Hopoate was part of the Manly side that defeated the New Zealand Warriors in the 2011 NRL Grand Final where he was denied the opening try but did produce a flick pass that sent Glenn Stewart over the line for a crucial try in the second half.

=== Parramatta Eels ===
In October 2011, Hopoate signed a two-year contract with the Parramatta Eels starting in 2014, after his Mormon mission ended.

In April 2015, he agreed to re-sign with the Parramatta club on a three-year contract, however due to legal complications, the contract wasn't registered and Hopoate was left a free agent. In 2016, Hopoate took the Parramatta Eels to court and was seeking $1.83 million in damages.

On 29 October 2016, both parties came to an agreement of a $400,000 settlement.

=== Canterbury-Bankstown Bulldogs ===
On 7 December 2015, Hopoate signed a 2-year contract with the Canterbury-Bankstown Bulldogs starting in 2016. In his first season with Canterbury, Hopoate announced that he would not be playing for the club on Sundays due to his religious faith. Hopoate even went as far to say that he would not play for Canterbury in the grand final if the club was to make it that far as the final is on a Sunday. Hopoate missed Canterbury's qualifying final against Penrith due to the game being played on Sunday.

On 14 May 2017, Hopoate reversed his decision and declared that he would be playing Sunday games again for Canterbury. On 1 June 2017, Hopoate re-signed with the Canterbury-Bankstown Bulldogs for a further three years until 2020.

On 27 November 2019, Hopoate signed a two-year contract extension to remain at Canterbury until the end of the 2021 season.

Hopoate made a total of 13 appearances for Canterbury in the 2020 NRL season. The club finished in 15th place on the table, only avoiding the Wooden Spoon by for and against.

On 10 August 2021, Hopoate signed a two-year deal with English side St Helens RFC with the option of a third season. Hopoate made a total of 24 appearances for Canterbury in the 2021 NRL season as the club finished last and claimed the Wooden Spoon.

=== St Helens ===
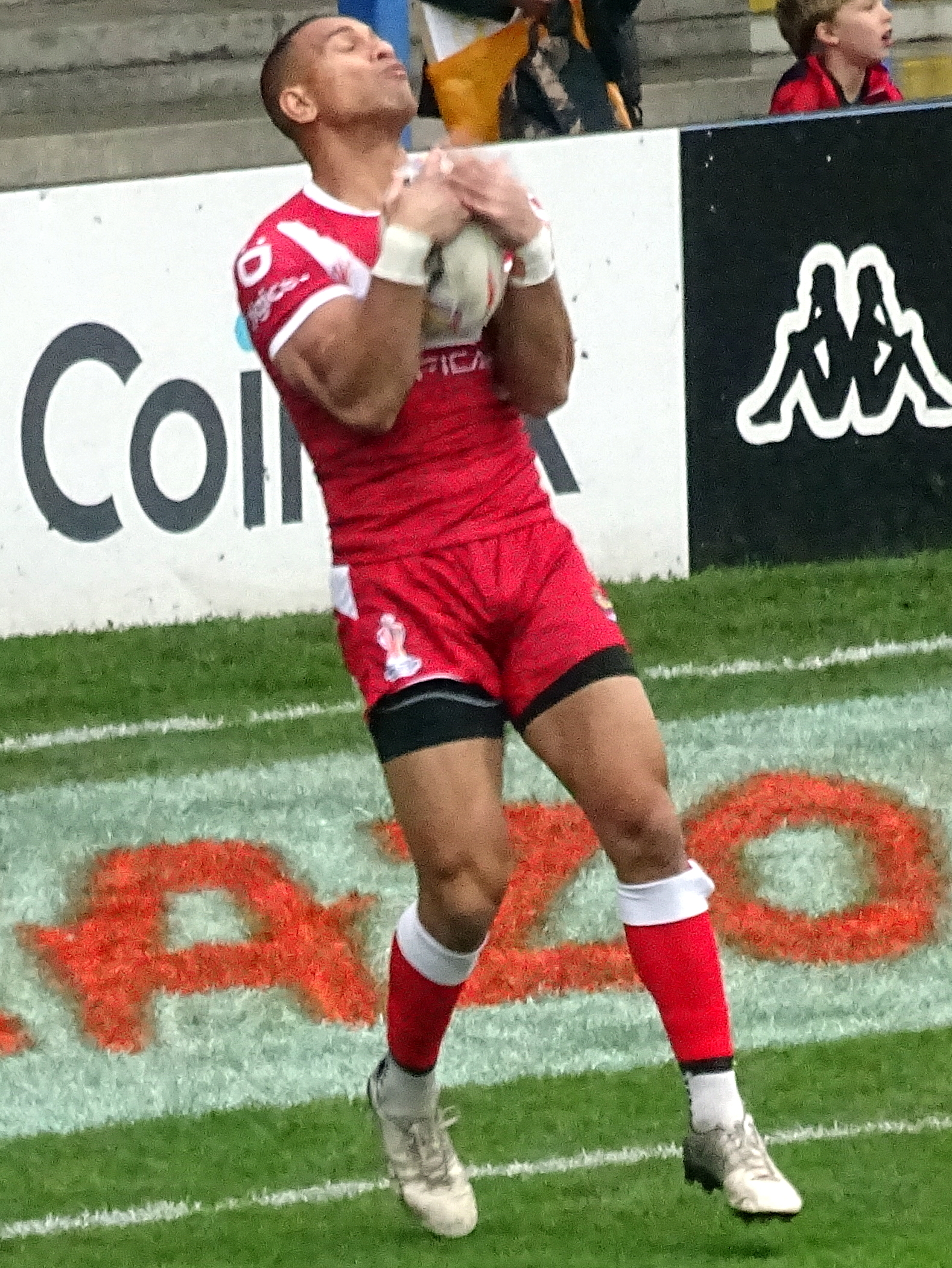
Hopoate catching the ball for Tonga at the 2021 RLWC

In round 1 of the 2022 Super League season, Hopoate made his club debut for St Helens where they defeated the Catalans Dragons 28-8. On 24 September 2022, Hopoate played at centre in St Helens 24-12 Super League Grand Final victory over Leeds. On 18 February 2023, Hopoate played in St Helens 13-12 upset victory over Penrith in the 2023 World Club Challenge. On 21 September 2023, it was announced that Hopoate would be departing St Helens at the end of the 2023 Super League season. Hopoate played 16 games for St Helens in the 2023 Super League season as the club finished third on the table. He played in St Helens narrow loss against the Catalans Dragons in the semi-final which ended St Helens four-year dominance of the competition. On 5 November 2023, immediately following the 2023 Tonga tour of England, he announced his retirement from professional rugby league.

== Representative career ==
=== NSW ===
On 5 June 2011, Hopoate was selected to play State of Origin for New South Wales in Game 2 against Queensland at ANZ Stadium. He is the second youngest player behind Brad Fittler ever selected to play for NSW and he scored a try on debut helping NSW level the 3-game series at one all with an 18–8 win.

=== Tonga ===
In 2017, Hopoate elected to represent the nation of his ancestral heritage, Tonga. He played fullback in every game of their stunning charge to the 2017 Rugby League World Cup semi-finals. He was a tryscorer in their shock win over New Zealand in the pool stage of the tournament.

He was named at fullback again for the historic first-ever Test match between Tonga and the Australian Kangaroos on 20 October 2018, played in front of a sold-out crowd at Mount Smart Stadium, Auckland.

In October 2022, he was named in the Tonga squad for the 2021 Rugby League World Cup.

== Post Playing ==
In September 2026, Manly confirmed that Hopoate will return to the club as the club's new Wellbeing, Careers and Education Manager.

== Personal life ==
Outside of rugby league, Hopoate is an active member of the Church of Jesus Christ of Latter-day Saints. As such Hopoate chose not to take part in his early league career and spent 2012 and 2013 serving a two-year mission for The Church of Jesus Christ of Latter-day Saints (LDS Church).
