= 2023 Manly Warringah Sea Eagles season =

2023 Manly-Warringah Sea Eagles Season
- Pre-Season Challenge champions
- NRL rank: 12th
- Play-off result: DNQ
- 2023 record: Wins: 11; draws: 1; losses: 12

Team information
- CEO: (Australia) Tony Mestrov
- Coach: (Australia) Anthony Seibold
- Captain: (Australia) Daly Cherry-Evans
- Stadium: Brookvale Oval (4 Pines Park) (18,000)
- Avg. attendance: 13,650 (not including home matches away from Brookvale)
- High attendance: 17,385 (Round 18 v SYD) not including home matches away from Brookvale
- Low attendance: 10,102 (Round 24 v PEN) not including home matches away from Brookvale

Top scorers
- Tries: (Nigeria) Jason Saab (14)
- Points: (Australia) Reuben Garrick (174)
← 2022	2024 →

The 2023 Manly Warringah Sea Eagles season was the 74th in the club's history since their entry to the New South Wales Rugby League premiership in 1947. The coach was Anthony Seibold taking over from Des Hasler. Daly Cherry-Evans captained the club for the seventh consecutive year. The Sea Eagles won the inaugural pre-season challenge.

== Des Hasler Situation ==
As a result of not making the finals in 2022, a requirement under Des Hasler's contract, his contract would not able to automatically extend to the end of 2024. Initially the situation started out with a change in assistant coaches with Chad Randall and Michael Monaghan leaving the club. It upset Hasler, but after meetings everything was reported that everyone was happy before reports came out that Hasler would coach the club until the end of 2024, with a succession plan in place, which put the club in unrest.

A month later in October 2022, Des Hasler announced he threatened to sue Manly over the Manly pride jersey player boycott, as he believed that it derailed the season as a result of how there was little communication given between the playing group, coaching staff and the management about what was going on. By then Manly powerbrokers already identified Anthony Seibold as a potential successor to Hasler, with Hasler identifying Josh Hannay as his preferred successor. Emails were also leaked between Manly officials involving the pride jersey. It was then reported that if he is to coach Manly in 2023, he would have no say in recruitment/retention, accept Seibold as his successor and accept that 2023 would be his last year.

On the 13th of October 2022, Hasler was sacked from the club. On the 8th of November 2022, Seibold was officially announced as the head coach for the Sea Eagles.

== 2023 Squad ==
Manly Warringah Sea Eagles 2023 squad
Top 30 squad - 2023 NRL season			Development players	Coaching staff
Josh Aloiai – LK, PR; Jake Arthur – FE, HB; Morgan Boyle – PR; Ethan Bullemor – SR; Daly Cherry-Evans (c) – HB (gk); Ben Condon – PR, LK; Lachlan Croker – HK; Latu Fainu – FE, HB; Samuela Fainu – SR; Zac Fulton – LK, SR	Reuben Garrick – WG, CE, FB (gk); Morgan Harper – CE; Sean Keppie – PR, LK; Tolu Koula – CE, FB; Karl Lawton – HK; Haumole Olakau'atu – SR; Brad Parker – CE; Taniela Paseka – PR; Jason Saab – WG; Josh Schuster – FE	Toafofoa Sipley – PR; Ben Trbojevic – SR; Jake Trbojevic (vc) – PR, LK; Tom Trbojevic – FB; Kelma Tuilagi – SR; Christian Tuipulotu – WG; Ray Vaega – WG; Kaeo Weekes – FB, FE; Aaron Woods – LK	Gordon Chan Kum Tong – HK; Jamie Humphreys – HB, FE; Jacob Sykes – SR, PR, LK; Extended squad: Cooper Johns – FE, HB; Matthew Lodge – PR; Dean Matterson – LK, FE, SR	Manager: John Bonasera (General Manager of Football); Head coach: Anthony Seibold; Assistant coaches: Jim Dymock; Shane Flanagan; Steven Hales (Skill Development Coach); Guy Williams (Training Co-ordinator & Transition Coach); Brett Stewart (Mentor Positional Coach); Paul Devlin (High Performance Consultant); Managers: Peter Gentle (Recruitment Manager); Legend: (c) Captain(s); (vc) Vice-captain(s); Updated: 5 August 2023; Source(s): Sea Eagles Team Profiles, 2023

== Transfers ==
Gains
Player	Club	Until	Source
Jake Arthur (gained mid-season)	Parramatta Eels	2024	
Ben Condon	North QLD Cowboys	2025	
Austin Dias	Wests Tigers	TBC	
Cooper Johns	Melbourne Storm	2023	
Matthew Lodge (gained mid-season)	Sydney Roosters	2023	
Kelma Tuilagi	Wests Tigers	2025	
Aaron Woods (gained mid-season)	St. George Illawarra Dragons	2023	

Losses
Player	Club	Until	Source
Andrew Davey	Canterbury-Bankstown Bulldogs	2024	
Sione Fainu (left mid 2022)	Wests Tigers	2024	
Kieran Foran	Gold Coast Titans	2024	
Jorge Taufua (left mid 2022)	Wakefield Trinity	2023	
Martin Taupau	Brisbane Broncos	2023	
Dylan Walker	New Zealand Warriors	2025	

Re-Signed: Josh Aloiai (2025), Daly Cherry-Evans (2025), Toluta'u Koula (2024), Karl Lawton (2024), Ben Trbojevic (2024), Kaeo Weekes (2023)

== Results ==
2023 NRL season
Pos	Team	Pld	W	D	L	B	PF	PA	PD	Pts
1	Penrith Panthers (P)	24	18	0	6	3	645	312	+333	42
2	Brisbane Broncos	24	18	0	6	3	639	425	+214	42
3	Melbourne Storm	24	16	0	8	3	627	459	+168	38
4	New Zealand Warriors	24	16	0	8	3	572	448	+124	38
5	Newcastle Knights	24	14	1	9	3	626	451	+175	35
6	Cronulla-Sutherland Sharks	24	14	0	10	3	619	497	+122	34
7	Sydney Roosters	24	13	0	11	3	472	496	−24	32
8	Canberra Raiders	24	13	0	11	3	486	623	−137	32
9	South Sydney Rabbitohs	24	12	0	12	3	564	505	+59	30
10	Parramatta Eels	24	12	0	12	3	587	574	+13	30
11	North Queensland Cowboys	24	12	0	12	3	546	542	+4	30
12	Manly Warringah Sea Eagles	24	11	1	12	3	545	539	+6	29
13	Dolphins	24	9	0	15	3	520	631	−111	24
14	Gold Coast Titans	24	9	0	15	3	527	653	−126	24
15	Canterbury-Bankstown Bulldogs	24	7	0	17	3	438	769	−331	20
16	St. George Illawarra Dragons	24	5	0	19	3	474	673	−199	16
17	Wests Tigers	24	4	0	20	3	385	675	−290	14

Pre-Season Challenge

Date	Round	Opponent	Venue	Score	Tries	Goals	Field Goals	Referee	Attendance
Fri 10 Feb 8:00pm	1	South Sydney Rabbitohs	Central Coast Stadium	30-28	R. Vaega (2), J. Toby (2), Z. Fulton, C. Brown	C. Johns (3/6)		Todd Smith	9,807
Fri 17 Feb 8:00pm	2	Sydney Roosters	Central Coast Stadium	16-28	R. Garrick (3), K. Tuilagi, T. Koula	R. Garrick (4/6)		Chris Butler	10,744

Regular Season

Date	Round	Opponent	Venue	Score	Tries	Goals	Field Goals	Referee	Attendance
Sat 4 March 3:00pm	1	Canterbury-Bankstown Bulldogs	Brookvale Oval	31-6	D. Cherry-Evans (3), T. Trbojevic, R. Garrick	R. Garrick (5/5)	D. Cherry-Evans (1/1)	Grant Atkins	17,278
9-12 March	2	Bye							
Thu 16 March 7:50pm	3	Parramatta Eels	Brookvale Oval	34-30	T. Trbojevic (2), H. Olakau'atu (2), R. Garrick, B. Parker	R. Garrick (4/6)		Adam Gee	13,353
Sat 25 March 7:35pm	4	South Sydney Rabbitohs	Accor Stadium	13-12	H. Olakau'atu, D. Cherry-Evans	R. Garrick (2/2)		Chris Sutton	18,379
Sat 1 April 3:00pm	5	Newcastle Knights	Glen Willow Regional Sports Stadium	32-32	H. Olakau'atu, C. Tuipulotu, B. Parker, K. Tuilagi, K. Weekes, R. Garrick	R. Garrick (4/6)		Chris Butler	9,024
Sat 8 April 5:30pm	6	Penrith Panthers	Penrith Stadium	44-12	J. Saab, T. Trbojevic	D. Cherry-Evans (2/2)		Todd Smith	20,312
Fri 14 April 8:00pm	7	Melbourne Storm	Brookvale Oval	18-8	T. Trbojevic, L. Croker	D. Cherry-Evans (5/6)		Adam Gee	13,572
Sun 23 April 4:05pm	8	Wests Tigers	Campbelltown Stadium	16-22	D. Cherry-Evans, H. Olakau'atu, J. Saab	R. Garrick (3/3)		Todd Smith	10,033
Sat 29 April 5:30pm	9	Gold Coast Titans	Brookvale Oval	10-26	S. Keppie	R. Garrick (3/3)		Ben Cummins	10,107
Fri 5 May 8:05pm	10	Brisbane Broncos	Suncorp Stadium	6-32	B. Trbojevic	R. Garrick (1/1)		Gerard Sutton	50,077
Sun 14 May 4:05pm	11	Cronulla-Sutherland Sharks	Brookvale Oval	14-20	R. Garrick, L. Croker	R. Garrick (3/3)		Ashley Klein	10,358
Sun 21 May 4:05pm	12	Canberra Raiders	GIO Stadium	16-42	T. Trbojevic (3), B. Parker, R. Garrick, J. Schuster, J. Saab, B. Condon	R. Garrick (5/8)		Gerard Sutton	14,730
Sun 28 May 4:05pm	13	Newcastle Knights	McDonald Jones Stadium	28-18	R. Garrick, L. Croker, J. Saab	R. Garrick (3/4)		Peter Gough	20,661
2-4 June	14	Bye							
Fri 9 June 8:00pm	15	Dolphins	Brookvale Oval	58-18	R. Garrick (3), J. Saab (2), T. Trbojevic (2), T. Koula (2), L. Croker	R. Garrick (9/10)		Gerard Sutton	14,598
Sat 17 June 5:30pm	16	Parramatta Eels	Commbank Stadium	34-4	C. Tuipulotu	R. Garrick (0/1)		Chris Butler	21,296
Sat 24 June 7:35pm	17	Melbourne Storm	AAMI Park	24-6	H. Olakau'atu	R. Garrick (1/1)		Todd Smith	13,198
Sun 2 July 4:05pm	18	Sydney Roosters	Brookvale Oval	18-16	D. Cherry-Evans (2), B. Trbojevic	R. Garrick (3/3)		Ben Cummins	17,385
6-9 July	19	Bye							
Sat 15 July 5:30pm	20	North Queensland Cowboys	Brookvale Oval	8-19	D. Matterson, B. Parker	D. Cherry-Evans (0/1),R. Garrick (0/1)		Adam Gee	13,240
Sun 23 July 4:05pm	21	Cronulla-Sutherland Sharks	Shark Park	26-30	T. Koula (2), J. Aloiai, L. Croker, H. Olakau'atu, R. Garrick	R. Garrick (3/6)		Peter Gough	10,634
Sat 29 July 5:30pm	22	St. George Illawarra Dragons	WIN Stadium	24-18	T. Koula, H. Olakau'atu, R. Garrick, J. Saab	R. Garrick (3/4)		Chris Butler	14,872
Thu 3 August 7:50pm	23	Sydney Roosters	Sydney Cricket Ground	26-16	J. Schuster, B. Parker, T. Koula	R. Garrick (2/4)		Ashley Klein	12,197
Thu 10 August 7:50pm	24	Penrith Panthers	Brookvale Oval	12-24	T. Sipley, R. Garrick	R. Garrick (2/2)		Gerard Sutton	10,102
Fri 18 August 6:00pm	25	New Zealand Warriors	Go Media Stadium	29-22	J. Saab (3), J. Arthur	R. Garrick (3/4)		Todd Smith	24,112
Sun 27 August 2:00pm	26	Canterbury-Bankstown Bulldogs	Accor Stadium	24-42	J. Saab (2), T. Sipley, R. Vaega, H. Olakau'atu, D. Cherry-Evans, L. Croker	D. Cherry-Evans (6/7), G. Chan Kum Tong (1/1)		Liam Kennedy	13,074
Fri 1 September 6:00pm	27	Wests Tigers	Brookvale Oval	54-12	T. Koula (2), J. Saab, E. Bullemor, H. Olakau'atu, J. Trbojevic, R. Vaega, G. Chan Kum Tong, D. Cherry-Evans	D. Cherry-Evans (7/10)		Belinda Sharpe	16,503

== Representative Players ==
- Daly Cherry-Evans ( Queensland, Prime Minister's XIII, Australia)
- Gordon Chan Kum Tong ( Samoa)
- Austin Dias ( (Māori people) Māori All Stars)
- Latu Fainu ( New South Wales U19's)
- Samuela Fainu ( New South Wales U19's)
- Morgan Harper ( (Māori people) Māori All Stars)
- Tolu Koula ( Tonga)
- Haumole Olakau'atu ( Tonga)
- Jake Trbojevic ( New South Wales, Prime Minister's XIII, Australia)
- Tom Trbojevic ( New South Wales)

== Milestones ==
Daly Cherry-Evans played his 300th game for the club against the St. George Illawarra Dragons on the 29th of July 2023. He has played all of his games for the club. For Manly he scored 83 tries, 158 goals and 26 field goals. He was part of the 2011 Grand Final team. He has played in nine series for Queensland in state of origin, being the captain in 2019. He has made 18 appearances for the Kangaroos and played in both the 2013 and 2021 world cups. He also played for Australia at the 2019 RLWC 9s.

In that same game Lachlan Croker played his 100th game of NRL, playing all but one for the club. Before his 100th he had scored 16 tries and played games across both the hooker and five-eighth positions.

In Round 27 on the final home game for the season Jake Trbojevic played his 200th game for the Sea Eagles against the Wests Tigers playing all of his matches for the club. Before his 200th, he had scored 31 tries for the club. Trbojevic played 16 games for New South Wales in state of origin playing in every series from 2017. He has also made 12 appearances for the Kangaroos which included the 2017 and 2021 world cups.
