= 2022 Manly Warringah Sea Eagles season =

2022 NRL season by club

2022 Manly-Warringah Sea Eagles Season
- NRL rank: 11th
- Play-off result: DNQ
- 2022 record: Wins: 9; draws: 0; losses: 15

Team information
- CEO: (Australia) Stephen Humphreys --> (Australia) Gary Wolman (Interim) --> (Australia) Tony Mestrov
- Coach: (Australia) Des Hasler
- Captain: (Australia) Daly Cherry-Evans
- Stadium: Brookvale Oval (4 Pines Park) (20,000)
- Avg. attendance: 13,142 (Not including Home matches away from Brookvale)
- High attendance: 17,385 (Round 9 vs WST) Not including Home matches away from Brookvale
- Low attendance: 8,618 (Round 16 vs MEL) Not including Home matches away from Brookvale)

Top scorers
- Tries: (Australia) Reuben Garrick (12)
- Points: (Australia) Reuben Garrick (162)
← 2021	2023 →

The 2022 Manly Warringah Sea Eagles season was the 73rd in the club's history since their entry to the New South Wales Rugby League premiership in 1947. Des Hasler coached the club for the fourth consecutive year and twelfth overall. Daly Cherry-Evans captained the club for the sixth consecutive year. Pointsbet became the new major sponsor for the club taking over URM who moved onto a premier partner role. The season was notable for an incident when seven players boycotted the round 20 match against the Sydney Roosters due to their refusal to wear the club's "pride" jersey.

== Brookvale Oval Upgrade ==
A new 3000 seat grandstand on the Northern end of the ground opened to spectators in March 2022. It will provide training facilities for players as well. With the new grandstand and no COVID-19 restrictions, the ground returned back to full capacity for the first time since Round 1, 2020.

== 2022 Squad ==
Manly-Warringah Sea Eagles 2022 Squad
Top 30 Squad - 2022 Season			Development Players	Coaching Staff
Josh Aloiai – PR, LK; Morgan Boyle – PR; Ethan Bullemor – SR, LK, PR; Daly Cherry-Evans (c) – HB; Lachlan Croker – HK; Andrew Davey – SR, PR; Kurt De Luis – PR, LK; Viliami Fifita – SR, PR; Kieran Foran (vc) – FE, HB; Reuben Garrick – WG, FB	Morgan Harper – CE; Sean Keppie – PR, LK; Tolu Koula – CE, FB; Karl Lawton – SR, HK; Haumole Olakau'atu – SR; Brad Parker – CE; Taniela Paseka – PR; Jason Saab – WG; Josh Schuster – SR, FE; Toafofoa Sipley – PR, LK	Martin Taupau – PR; Jorge Taufua – WG, CE; Ben Trbojevic – CE, SR; Jake Trbojevic (vc) – LK, PR; Tom Trbojevic – FB; Christian Tuipulotu – WG; Alec Tu'itavake – PR, SR, LK; Dylan Walker – LK, CE, HK; Kaeo Weekes – FB, FE	Gordon Chan Kum Tong – HK; Zac Fulton – SR, LK; Jamie Humphreys – HB, FE; Jacob Sykes – PR, SR; Extended squad: James Roumanos – LK, PR; Pio Seci – CE, WG; James Segeyaro – HK, HB, FE; Alfred Smalley – CE, WG; Ray Vaega – WG	Head coach: Des Hasler; Assistant coaches: Chad Randall; Michael Monaghan; Steven Hales; Physiotherapist: Chris Bailey; Legend: (c) Captain(s); (vc) Vice-captain(s); Updated: 14 August 2022; Source(s): Sea Eagles Team Profiles

== Transfers ==
Gains
Player	Club	Until	Source
Ethan Bullemor	Brisbane Broncos	2023	

Promoted Players
Player	Side	Until	Source
Gordon Chan Kum Tong	SG Ball Cup Team	2023	
Jamie Humphreys	SG Ball Cup Team	2023	

Losses
Player	Club	Until	Source
Cade Cust	Wigan Warriors	2023	
Sione Fainu (Mid-Season)	Wests Tigers	2024	
Tevita Funa	NSW Waratahs (Union)	2022	
Jack Gosiewski	St. George Illawarra Dragons	2022	
Zac Saddler	Released		
Curtis Sironen	St Helens R.F.C.	2023	
Moses Suli	St. George Illawarra Dragons	2024	
Jorge Taufua (Mid-Season)	Wakefield Trinity	2024	

Re-Signed Players:

Morgan Boyle (2022), Lachlan Croker (2023), Reuben Garrick (2023), Morgan Harper (2023), Sean Keppie (2024), Haumole Olakau'atu (2024), Brad Parker (2023), Josh Schuster (2024), Toafofoa Sipley (2023), Jorge Taufua (2022), Dylan Walker (2022)

== Results ==
2022 NRL season
Pos	Team	Pld	W	D	L	B	PF	PA	PD	Pts
1	Penrith Panthers (P)	24	20	0	4	1	636	330	+306	42
2	Cronulla-Sutherland Sharks	24	18	0	6	1	573	364	+209	38
3	North Queensland Cowboys	24	17	0	7	1	633	361	+272	36
4	Parramatta Eels	24	16	0	8	1	608	489	+119	34
5	Melbourne Storm	24	15	0	9	1	657	410	+247	32
6	Sydney Roosters	24	15	0	9	1	635	434	+201	32
7	South Sydney Rabbitohs	24	14	0	10	1	604	474	+130	30
8	Canberra Raiders	24	14	0	10	1	524	461	+63	30
9	Brisbane Broncos	24	13	0	11	1	514	550	−36	28
10	St. George Illawarra Dragons	24	12	0	12	1	469	569	−100	26
11	Manly Warringah Sea Eagles	24	9	0	15	1	490	595	−105	20
12	Canterbury-Bankstown Bulldogs	24	7	0	17	1	383	575	−192	16
13	Gold Coast Titans	24	6	0	18	1	455	660	−205	14
14	Newcastle Knights	24	6	0	18	1	372	662	−290	14
15	New Zealand Warriors	24	6	0	18	1	408	700	−292	14
16	Wests Tigers	24	4	0	20	1	352	679	−327	10

Pre-Season

2022 Manly Sea Eagles Trials Results
Date	Round	Opponent	Venue	Score	Tries	Goals	Field goals	Attendance
Fri 18 February 8:00pm	1	Wests Tigers	Leichhardt Oval	4-28	R. Vaega (3), B. Parker, R. Garrick, C. Tuipulotu	R. Garrick (0/3), J. Humphreys (2/3)		5,563
Fri 25 February 6:00pm	2	Canberra Raiders	Central Coast Stadium	16-18	J. Saab, T. Koula, T. Trbojevic	R. Garrick (2/3)		5,601

Regular Season

2022 Manly Sea Eagles Season Results
Date	Round	Opponent	Venue	Score	Tries	Goals	Field goals	Attendance
Thu 10 March 8:05pm	1	Penrith Panthers	Penrith Stadium	28-6	E. Bullemor	R. Garrick (1/1)		16,901
Fri 18 March 8:05pm	2	Sydney Roosters	Sydney Cricket Ground	26-12	K. Lawton, D. Cherry-Evans	R. Garrick (2/2)		11,872
Sun 27 March 6:15pm	3	Canterbury-Bankstown Bulldogs	Brookvale Oval	13-12	T. Trbojevic, R. Garrick	R. Garrick (2/2)	D. Cherry-Evans	13,261
Sat 2 April 5:30pm	4	Canberra Raiders	Glen Willow Regional Sports Stadium	25-6	R. Garrick, M. Harper, H. Olakau'atu, T. Trbojevic	R. Garrick (4/5)	D. Cherry-Evans	6,972
Thu 7 April 7:50pm	5	Newcastle Knights	McDonald Jones Stadium	6-30	A. Davey, M. Harper, K. Lawton, H. Olakau'atu, T. Paseka	R. Garrick (5/6)		9,472
Sat 16 April 5:30pm	6	Gold Coast Titans	Brookvale Oval	26-18	H, Olakau'atu (2), R. Garrick, K. Foran	R. Garrick (4/4) D. Cherry-Evans (1/1)		16,220
Thu 21 April 7:50pm	7	Cronulla-Sutherland Sharks	Shark Park	34-22	C. Tuipulotu, T. Paseka, L. Croker, H. Olakau'atu	R. Garrick (3/4)		9,611
Fri 29 April 7:55pm	8	South Sydney Rabbitohs	Central Coast Stadium	40-22	K, Foran, J. Saab, C. Tuipulotu, D. Cherry-Evans	R. Garrick (3/4)		17,284
Sat 7 May 3:00pm	9	Wests Tigers	Brookvale Oval	36-22	B. Trbojevic (2), R, Garrick (2), C. Tuipulotu, D. Cherry-Evans, J. Aloiai	R. Garrick (4/7)		17,385
Fri 13 May 8:05pm	10	Brisbane Broncos	Lang Park	38-0				40,267
Fri 20 May 7:55pm	11	Parramatta Eels	CommBank Stadium	22-20	R. Garrick (2), C. Tuipulotu, M. Harper	R. Garrick (2/4)		18,778
Thu 26 May 7:50pm	12	Melbourne Storm	AAMI Park	28-8	J. Taufua, C. Tuipulotu	R. Garrick (0/2)		10,168
Sat 4 June 7:35pm	13	New Zealand Warriors	Brookvale Oval	44-12	R. Garrick (2), T. Sipley, H. Olakau'atu, M. Taupau, H. Olakau'atu, J. Saab	R. Garrick (8/9)		9,248
Sun 12 June 2:00pm	14	Wests Tigers	Campbelltown Sports Stadium	4-30	J. Aloiai (2), R, Garrick, H. Olakau'atu, T. Koula	R. Garrick (5/6)		10,231
Fri 17 June 6:00pm	15	North Queensland Cowboys	Brookvale Oval	26-28	C. Tuipulotu (2), L. Croker (2), R. Garrick	R. Garrick (3/5)		9,266
Thu 30 June 7:50pm	16	Melbourne Storm	Brookvale Oval	36-30	T. Koula (2), J. Saab (2), C. Tuipulotu, M. Harper, H. Olakau'atu	R. Garrick (0/1), D. Cherry-Evans (4/7)		8,618
7-10 July	17	Bye						
Sat 16 July 5:30pm	18	Newcastle Knights	Brookvale Oval	42-12	J. Saab (2), T. Koula, H. Olakau’atu, A. Davey, C. Tuipulotu, L. Croker	D. Cherry-Evans (6/7), R. Garrick (1/1)		15,896
Fri 22 July 6:00pm	19	St. George Illawarra Dragons	Jubilee Stadium	20-6	J. Aloiai	R. Garrick (1/1)		7,137
Thu 28 July 7:50pm	20	Sydney Roosters	Brookvale Oval	10-20	A. Davey, A. Smalley	R. Garrick (1/2)		12,187
Fri 5 August 7:55pm	21	Parramatta Eels	Brookvale Oval	20-36	T. Koula, J. Saab, C. Tuipulotu	R. Garrick (4/5)		17,134
Sun 14 August 4:05pm	22	Gold Coast Titans	Cbus Super Stadium	44-24	R. Garrick, J. Trbojevic, B. Parker, T. Koula	R. Garrick (4/4)		11,753
Sat 20 August 5:30pm	23	Cronulla-Sutherland Sharks	Brookvale Oval	6-40	D. Cherry-Evans	D. Cherry-Evans (1/1)		12,243
Sat 27 August 3:00pm	24	Canberra Raiders	GIO Stadium	48-6	E. Bullemor	D. Cherry-Evans		16,697
Fri 2 September 6:00pm	25	Canterbury-Bankstown Bulldogs	Accor Stadium	21-20	D. Cherry-Evans, C. Tuipulotu, M. Taupau, H. Olakau'atu	D. Cherry-Evans (2/4)		13,648

== Representative Players ==
- Josh Aloiai ( Samoa)
- Daly Cherry-Evans ( Queensland Maroons, Prime Minister's XIII, Australia)
- Kieran Foran ( New Zealand)
- Morgan Harper ( (Māori people) Māori All Stars)
- Toluta'u Koula ( Tonga)
- Haumole Olakau'atu ( Tonga)
- Taniela Paseka ( Tonga)
- James Roumanos ( Lebanon)
- Josh Schuster ( Samoa)
- Pio Seci ( Fiji)
- Toafofoa Sipley ( Samoa)
- Martin Taupau ( Samoa)
- Jake Trbojevic ( New South Wales Blues, Australia)
- Christian Tuipulotu ( Tonga)
- Dylan Walker ( (Māori people) Māori All Stars)

== Club Awards ==
- Roy Bull Best and Fairest: Lachlan Croker
- Players' Player: Kieran Foran
- Ken Arthurson Rising Star: Toluta'u Koula
- Menzies Medal: Lachlan Croker
- Gordon Willougby Medal (best player voted by members): Daly Cherry-Evans
- Leading Point Scorer: Reuben Garrick
- Leading Try Scorer: Reuben Garrick
- NRL Club Community Award: Sean Keppie
