= 2024 Manly Warringah Sea Eagles season =

- NRL rank: 7th
- Play-off result: SF
- 2024 record: Wins: 13; draws: 1; losses: 10
- Points scored: For: 634; against: 521

Team information
- CEO: (Australia) Tony Mestrov
- Coach: (Australia) Anthony Seibold
- Captain: (Australia) Daly Cherry-Evans
- Stadium: Brookvale Oval (4 Pines Park) (18,000)
- Avg. attendance: 16,473 (not including home games away from Brookvale)
- High attendance: 17,385 (Round 8 vs PAR)
- Low attendance: 10,215 (Round 9 vs CAN)

Top scorers
- Tries: (Samoa) Tommy Talau (18)
- Points: (Australia) Reuben Garrick (202)
← 2023	2025 →

The 2024 Manly Warringah Sea Eagles season was the 75th in the club's history since their entry to the New South Wales Rugby League premiership in 1947. Anthony Seibold coached the club for the second consecutive year. Daly Cherry-Evans captained the club for the eighth consecutive year. The Sea Eagles participated in the first season opener in the United States at Allegiant Stadium in Las Vegas. The Sea Eagles finished the year by making the second week of the finals, it was the first time the team had made the finals since 2021.

== 2024 Squad ==
Manly Warringah Sea Eagles 2024 squad
Top 30 squad - 2024 NRL season			Supplementary list	Coaching staff
Josh Aloiai – PR; Jake Arthur – FE, HB; Luke Brooks – FE; Nathan Brown – LK; Ethan Bullemor – SR, PR; Gordon Chan Kum Tong – HK; Daly Cherry-Evans (c) – HB (gk); Ben Condon – SR; Lachlan Croker – HK; Reuben Garrick – CE (gk)	Jamie Humphreys – HB, FE, HK; Tolutau Koula – CE, FB; Karl Lawton – HK, HB, SR; Matthew Lodge – PR; Haumole Olakau'atu – SR; Brad Parker – SR; Taniela Paseka – PR; Jaxson Paulo – WG, CE, FB; Jason Saab – WG; Aaron Schoupp – CE, SR	Jake Simpkin – CE; Toafofoa Sipley – PR; Tommy Talau – WG, CE; Ben Trbojevic – SR, CE; Jake Trbojevic (vc) – LK; Tom Trbojevic – FB, CE; Raymond Tuaimalo Vaega – WG; Corey Waddell – SR, PR	Bailey Hodgson – CE, FB; Aitasi James – PR; Dean Matterson – LK, SR; Aaron Woods – PR, LK; Extended squad: Clayton Faulalo – CE, FB; Lehi Hopoate – FB, WG, CE; Caleb Navale – LK; Brandon Wakeham – HB, FE	Manager: John Bonasera (General Manager of Football); Head coach: Anthony Seibold; Assistant coaches: Jim Dymock; Steven Hales; Michael Ennis (Positional Coach); Brett Stewart (Mentor Positional Coach); Guy Williams (Training Co-ordinator & Transition Coach); Jon Clarke (Head of Performance); Paul Devlin (High Performance Consultant); Mick Kulen (Football Analyst/Attack Co-ordinator); Managers: Peter Gentle (Recruitment Manager); Legend: (c) Captain(s); (vc) Vice-captain(s); Updated: 21 September 2024; Source(s): Sea Eagles Team Profiles, Sea Eagles 2024

== Transfers ==
Gains
Player	Club	Until	Source
Luke Brooks	Wests Tigers	2027	
Aitasi James	Wests Tigers	2025	
Jaxson Paulo	Sydney Roosters	2026	
Aaron Schoupp	Gold Coast Titans (mid-season)	2025	
Jake Simpkin	Wests Tigers (mid-season)	2026	
Tommy Talau	Wests Tigers	2025	
Corey Waddell	Canterbury-Bankstown Bulldogs	2024	

Losses
Player	Club	Until	Source
Latu Fainu	Wests Tigers	2027	
Samuela Fainu	Wests Tigers	2027	
Morgan Harper	Parramatta Eels	2024	
Sean Keppie	South Sydney Rabbitohs	2026	
Josh Schuster	Released (mid-season)		
Kelma Tuilagi	Parramatta Eels	2025	
Christian Tuipulotu	St. George Illawarra Dragons	2025	

== Results ==
=== Pre-season ===
Date	Round	Opponent	Venue	Score	Tries	Goals	Field goals	Referee	Attendance
Sun 11 Feb 4:00pm	N/A	South Sydney Rabbitohs	Central Coast Stadium	68-6	B. Trbojevic (3), J. Sykes (2) R. Vaega (2), J. Humphreys (2), J. Arthur, C. Faulalo, C. Brown	J. Humphreys (10/12)		Chris Sutton	5,107

=== Pre-Season Challenge ===
Date	Round	Opponent	Venue	Score	Tries	Goals	Field goals	Referee	Attendance
Sat 17 Feb 3:45pm	1	Sydney Roosters	Central Coast Stadium	36-22	T. Sipley, C. Faulalo, J. Arthur, J. Paulo	B. Wakeham (3/4)		Peter Gough	8,663
Sat 24 Feb 5:55pm	2	Brisbane Broncos	Brookvale Oval	14-40	M. Lehmann (2), B. Parker	J. Humphreys (1/3)		Grant Atkins	

=== Regular season ===
==== Ladder ====
Pos	Team	Pld	W	D	L	B	PF	PA	PD	Pts	Qualification
1	Melbourne Storm	24	19	0	5	3	692	449	+243	44	Advance to finals series
2	Penrith Panthers (P)	24	17	0	7	3	580	394	+186	40	Advance to finals series
3	Sydney Roosters	24	16	0	8	3	738	463	+275	38	Advance to finals series
4	Cronulla-Sutherland Sharks	24	16	0	8	3	653	431	+222	38	Advance to finals series
5	North Queensland Cowboys	24	15	0	9	3	657	568	+89	36	Advance to finals series
6	Canterbury-Bankstown Bulldogs	24	14	0	10	3	529	433	+96	34	Advance to finals series
7	Manly Warringah Sea Eagles	24	13	1	10	3	634	521	+113	33	Advance to finals series
8	Newcastle Knights	24	12	0	12	3	470	510	−40	30	Advance to finals series
9	Canberra Raiders	24	12	0	12	3	474	601	−127	30	
10	Dolphins	24	11	0	13	3	577	578	−1	28	
11	St. George Illawarra Dragons	24	11	0	13	3	508	634	−126	28	
12	Brisbane Broncos	24	10	0	14	3	537	607	−70	26	
13	New Zealand Warriors	24	9	1	14	3	512	574	−62	25	
14	Gold Coast Titans	24	8	0	16	3	488	656	−168	22	
15	Parramatta Eels	24	7	0	17	3	561	716	−155	20	
16	South Sydney Rabbitohs	24	7	0	17	3	494	682	−188	20	
17	Wests Tigers	24	6	0	18	3	463	750	−287	18	

Source: National Rugby League
(P) Premiers

==== Results by round ====
Round	1	2	3	4	5	6	7	8	9	10	11	12	13	14	15	16	17	18	19	20	21	22	23	24	25	26	27
Ground	H	H	A	A	H	A	A	H	H	A	N	H	–	A	H	A	–	A	H	H	A	–	A	H	A	A	H
Result	W	W	L	L	W	D	W	W	L	L	L	W	B	L	W	L	B	W	W	W	L	B	W	W	L	W	L
Position	5	4	5	11	7	8	5	4	5	8	10	9	7	11	8	11	9	7	7	5	7	7	6	6	7	7	7
Points	2	4	4	4	6	7	9	11	11	11	11	13	15	15	17	17	19	21	23	25	25	27	29	31	31	33	33

Source: National Rugby League
A = Away; H = Home; N = Neutral; B = Bye; W = Win; D = Draw; L = Loss

==== Matches ====
Date	Round	Opponent	Venue	Score	Tries	Goals	Field goals	Referee	Attendance
Sun 3 March 1:30pm (Sat 2 March 6:30pm, Las Vegas Time)	1	South Sydney Rabbitohs	Allegiant Stadium	36–24	H. Olakau'atu, J. Saab, L. Croker, B. Trbojevic, R. Garrick, L. Brooks	R. Garrick (6/6)		Ashley Klein	40,746
Sun 17 Mach 4:05pm	2	Sydney Roosters	Brookvale Oval	21–14	L. Croker, T. Koula, T. Talau	R. Garrick (4/5)	D. Cherry-Evans	Todd Smith	17,284
Sun 24 March 4:05pm	3	Parramatta Eels	Commbank Stadium	28–24	T. Trbojevic, J. Paulo, R. Garrick, C. Waddell	R. Garrick (4/5)		Peter Gough	20,354
Sun 30 March 5:30pm	4	St. George Illawarra Dragons	WIN Stadium	20–12	T. Koula, H. Olakau'atu	R. Garrick (2/2)		Ashley Klein	16,215
Sat 6 April 5:30pm	5	Penrith Panthers	Brookvale Oval	32–12	T. Trbojevic, T. Koula, D. Cherry-Evans, C. Waddell, J. Paulo	D. Cherry-Evans (6/6)		Todd Smith	17,381
Sat 13 April 3:00pm (5:00pm Auckland)	6	New Zealand Warriors	Go Media Stadium	22–22 (g.p.)	D. Cherry-Evans (2), T. Talau, B. Trbojevic	D. Cherry-Evans (3/4)		Chris Butler	23,076
Sat 20 April 5:30pm	7	Gold Coast Titans	Cbus Super Stadium	34–30	T. Trbojevic (2), J. Saab, H. Olakau'atu, T. Koula, E. Bullemor	R. Garrick (5/6)		Liam Kennedy	13,336
Fri 26 April 8:00pm	8	Parramatta Eels	Brookvale Oval	32–18	R. Garrick (2), T. Talau, T. Trbojevic, D. Cherry-Evans	R. Garrick (6/6)		Gerard Sutton	17,385
Fri 3 May 6:00pm	9	Canberra Raiders	Brookvale Oval	26–24	R. Garrick (2), T. Trbojevic, T. Talau, D. Cherry-Evans	R. Garrick (2/5)		Grant Atkins	10,215
Thu 9 May 7:50pm	10	Dolphins	Suncorp Stadium	30–24	T. Talau, C. Waddell, T. Koula, T. Trbojevic	R. Garrick (4/5)		Ashley Klein	14,059
Fri 17 May 8:05pm	11	Brisbane Broncos	Suncorp Stadium	13–12	R. Garrick, R. Vaega	R. Garrick (2/2)		Todd Smith	50,971
Fri 24 May 8:00pm	12	Melbourne Storm	Brookvale Oval	26–20	T. Talau (2), B. Trbojevic, J. Trbojevic	R. Garrick (5/6)		Ashley Klein	17,211
30 May - 2 June	13	Bye							
Sun 9 June 4:05pm	14	Penrith Panthers	Penrith Stadium	32–22	T. Talau (4), J. Saab	R. Garrick (1/5)		Gerard Sutton	20,101
Sun 16 June 2:00pm	15	St. George Illawarra Dragons	Brookvale Oval	30–14	L. Hopoate, H. Olakau'atu, L. Brooks, B. Trbojevic, J. Trbojevic, J. Saab	D. Cherry-Evans (3/6), R. Garrick (0/1)		Peter Gough	17,187
Sat 22 June 7:35pm	16	South Sydney Rabbitohs	Accor Stadium	14–0				Chris Butler	10,076
28-30 June	17	Bye							
Sat 6 July 7:35pm	18	North Queensland Cowboys	Queensland Country Bank Stadium	21–20	J. Saab (3)	R. Garrick (4/4)	D. Cherry-Evans	Todd Smith	18,787
Sun 14 July 4:05pm	19	Newcastle Knights	Brookvale Oval	44–6	L. Hopoate (2), J. Humphreys, T. Trbojevic, J. Saab, T. Talau, R. Garrick, H. Olakau'atu	R. Garrick (3/5), J. Humphreys (3/3)		Grant Atkins	17,298
Sun 21 July 4:05pm	20	Gold Coast Titans	Brookvale Oval	38–8	T. Trbojevic (2), L. Brooks, L. Hopoate, J. Saab, B. Trbojevic, T. Talau	R. Garrick (5/7)		Liam Kennedy	16,050
Sat 27 July 7:35pm	21	Sydney Roosters	Allianz Stadium	34–30	L. Brooks, T. Sipley, T. Talau, C. Faulalo, D. Cherry-Evans	R. Garrick (1/1), D. Cherry-Evans (4/4)		Ashley Klein	25,155
1-4 August	22	Bye							
Sat 10 August 3:00pm	23	Canberra Raiders	GIO Stadium	46–24	T. Trbojevic (2), T. Talau, E. Bullemor, D. Cherry-Evans, L. Hopoate, T, Paseka, L. Brooks	R. Garrick (7/8)		Grant Atkins	16,690
Fri 16 August 6:00pm	24	New Zealand Warriors	Brookvale Oval	24–10	J. Saab, T. Trbojevic, R. Garrick, L. Hopoate	R. Garrick (4/5)		Chris Butler	17,333
Thu 22 August 7:50pm	25	Wests Tigers	Leichhardt Oval	34–26	T. Trbojevic (3), J. Saab, L. Hopoate	R. Garrick (3/5)		Peter Gough	11,520
Fri 30 August 6:05pm	26	Canterbury-Bankstown Bulldogs	Accor Stadium	22–34	L. Hopoate (2), J. Saab, T. Trbojevic, K. Lawton, R. Garrick	R. Garrick (5/6)		Ashley Klein	35,502
Sun 8 September 2:00pm	27	Cronulla-Sutherland Sharks	Brookvale Oval	20–40	T. Talau, C. Faulalo, H. Olakau'atu, T. Koula	R. Garrick (2/4)		Adam Gee	17,384

=== Finals Series ===
Date	Final	Opponent	Venue	Score	Tries	Goals	Field goals	Referee	Attendance
Sun 15 September 4:05pm	Elimination Final	Canterbury-Bankstown Bulldogs	Accor Stadium	22–24	T. Talau, E. Bullemor, D. Cherry-Evans, T. Koula	R. Garrick (4/4)		Grant Atkins	50,704
Sat 21 September 7:50pm	Semi Final	Sydney Roosters	Allianz Stadium	40-16	H. Olakau'atu, T. Talau, B. Trbojevic	R. Garrick (2/3)		Grant Atkins	40,818

== Representative Players ==
- Luke Brooks ( (Australia) Prime Minister's XIII)
- Ethan Bullemor ( (Australia) Prime Minister's XIII)
- Gordon Chan Kum Tong ( Samoa)
- Daly Cherry-Evans ( Queensland - Captain)
- Zac Fulton ( Indigenous All Stars)
- Reuben Garrick ( (Australia) Prime Minister's XIII)
- Lehi Hopoate ( Tonga)
- Toluta'u Koula ( Tonga)
- Caleb Navale ( Fiji)
- Haumole Olakau'atu ( New South Wales, Tonga)
- Taniela Paseka ( Tonga)
- Jake Trbojevic ( New South Wales - Captain)
- Tom Trbojevic ( Australia)

== Milestones ==
In the Round 4 game against the St. George Illawarra Dragons, Reuben Garrick reached 1000 points for club matches after converting Koula's try.

In the Round 5 game against the Penrith Panthers, Daly Cherry-Evans became the most capped player at the Sea Eagles, passing Cliff Lyons record of 309 matches.

In the Round 5 game against the Penrith Panthers, Corey Waddell played his 100th NRL game. This was his 41st game for the club after playing with Manly in the 2019 and 2020 seasons, with the 59 other games being with the Canterbury-Bankstown Bulldogs.

In the Round 20 game against the Gold Coast Titans, with his second goal of the night Reuben Garrick moved past Matthew Ridge's total of 1,093 points scored for the club to move into 4th outright on the clubs all time point scoring list. Garrick would finish the minor round with 190 points scored in 2024 (10 tries, 75 goals) and needing just 3 points to move into 3rd outright past Bob Batty who scored 1,154 points for Manly from 1959-1971.
