= 2021 Manly Warringah Sea Eagles season =

2021 Manly-Warringah Sea Eagles Season
- NRL rank: 4th
- Play-off result: Preliminary Finals
- 2021 record: Wins: 16; draws: 0; losses: 8

Team information
- CEO: (Australia) Stephen Humphreys
- Coach: (Australia) Des Hasler
- Captain: (Australia) Daly Cherry-Evans
- Stadium: Brookvale Oval (restricted capacity)
- Avg. attendance: 5,705 (Note: Not including home matches away from Brookvale)
- High attendance: 6,801 (Round 14 vs NQL)
- Low attendance: 3,218 (Round 2 SOU)

Top scorers
- Tries: (Australia) Tom Trbojevic (28)
- Points: (Australia) Reuben Garrick (334)
← 2020	2022 →

The 2021 Manly-Warringah Sea Eagles Season was the 72nd in the club's history since their entry into the then New South Wales Rugby League premiership in 1947. Des Hasler coached the team for the third consecutive year and eleventh overall at the club. Daly Cherry-Evans captained the club for the fifth consecutive year.

== Brookvale Oval (4 Pines Park) upgrade and home ground capacity ==
Construction started for a new 3,000-seat grandstand and a centre of excellence on the Northern Hill. The $33.1 million project was to ensure that players and fans get access to better facilities than what the stadium currently provides. Due to that and limited capacity on the hill (due to COVID-19), there were only small crowds allowed in at home games. Grandstands were allowed at 100% on the final game before the games started to play behind closed doors.

== Transfers ==
=== 2021 gains ===
- Josh Aloiai from Wests Tigers
- Andrew Davey from Parramatta Eels
- Kieran Foran from Canterbury-Bankstown Bulldogs
- Christian Tuipulotu from Sydney Roosters
- Jason Saab from St. George Illawarra Dragons

=== 2021 losses ===
- Joel Thompson to St Helens R.F.C. (Super League)
- Corey Waddell to Canterbury-Bankstown Bulldogs
- Addin Fonua-Blake to New Zealand Warriors

== Season summary ==
=== Horror start to the season ===
Manly had one of their worst start to a season in club history, losing all of their first four games and at a combined score of 156–34. It got so bad that there were talks that coach Des Hasler may get sacked, however he was re-signed on a two-year deal and was told he wouldn't be coaching in 2023 if the club didn't make the finals in 2021 or 22. Captain Daly Cherry-Evans suitability for the role was also questioned. The club achieved their first win in round 5 of the season playing the New Zealand Warriors at Central Coast Stadium when Daly Cherry-Evans kicked a winning field goal to win 13–12. Despite the terrible start to the season it is worth noting that the four clubs that Manly lost to (Sydney Roosters, South Sydney Rabbitohs, St. George Illawarra Dragons and Penrith Panthers) all made up the top four after the first 5 rounds.

=== Turbo returns ===
In Round 6 the club faced the Gold Coast Titans in what was expected by many people to be yet another hammering against the club. However, with Tom Trbojevic returning to the side from his fourth hamstring injury in just two years, Manly played the reverse card winning 36–0 with Trbojevic being named man of the match after scoring a try, making 3 assists and being involved with a crucial pass to Cherry-Evans that led to the second try.

Following that performance Trbojevic produced man of the match performances against the Wests Tigers, New Zealand Warriors, Brisbane Broncos and Parramatta Eels, only losing to the Penrith Panthers in that time frame in what was a much better performance than the first time they played. Manly ended the first half to the season with a poor (but controversial) loss to the Newcastle Knights.

=== Origin period ===
After a bye, Manly thrashed the North Queensland Cowboys 50-18 without Trbojevic, with many players being the potential Man Of The Match, this match also was special as it was a game for Manly icon Bob Fulton, who had died a few weeks earlier (a moment of silence occurred before the match against the Parramatta Eels in Round 11 but this was the first home match since his death).

The following week, Manly produced one of the biggest comebacks in history against the Gold Coast Titans after being down 24–8, the team scored 48 unanswered points to win 56–24.

The following week, Manly produced their biggest win in club history beating the Canterbury-Bankstown Bulldogs 66–0.

The origin period rounded off with a 30–16 loss against the Canberra Raiders and a 32–18 win against the St. George Illawarra Dragons.

=== Run to the finals and records broken ===
Manly started off their run to the finals with a 44–24 win against the Wests Tigers, a 40–22 win against the Cronulla-Sutherland Sharks and a 28–18 loss to the Melbourne Storm.

In Round 22, Manly beat the Parramatta Eels 56–10 in a very strong performance. Reuben Garrick also achieved a record in the match passing the record for most points scored for the club in a season by a player, passing Matthew Ridge's record of 255, with Garrick having scored 258 points at the end of the round.

Manly continued their winning performances against the Canberra Raiders, winning 19–18.

In Round 24, the club's 36–18 win over the Canterbury-Bankstown Bulldogs propelled them into the top four and ensured that Tom Trbojevic would win the prestigious Dally M Medal for player of the year.

Round 25, the club beat the Cowboys 46–18 in a strong second half performance. Reuben Garrick (304) also passed Hazem El Masri's (288) record for most points in a regular season. The game also saw a collective effort from Reuben Garrick, Daly Cherry-Evans and Tom Trbojevic to score the try of the year.

=== Finals ===
Manly started off with a poor performance to begin the finals, losing to the Melbourne Storm 40–12 at Sunshine Coast Stadium forcing them into a second chance semi due to them finishing in the top four.

Manly produced a 42–6 win against the Sydney Roosters advancing them to the preliminary finals.

On the lead up to their preliminary final match against the South Sydney Rabbitohs, many people, especially former Penrith player Ryan Girdler criticised Manly for making the top four but not beating any side that finished in the top four labelling them as 'flat track bullies' stating that they don't deserve to be 80 minutes away from a grand final. Manly went on to lose the match 36–16, with Tom Trbojevic breaking Phil Blake's record (27) for most tries in a season for the club scoring 28.

Tom Trbojevic finished the season as top try scorer for the club, with Reuben Garrick finishing as top point scorer with 334 points.

== Results ==
Pos	Team	Pld	W	D	L	B	PF	PA	PD	Pts	
1	Melbourne Storm (M)	24	21	0	3	1	815	316	+499	44	Advance to finals series
2	Penrith Panthers (P)	24	21	0	3	1	676	286	+390	44	Advance to finals series
3	South Sydney Rabbitohs	24	20	0	4	1	775	453	+322	42	Advance to finals series
4	Manly-Warringah Sea Eagles	24	16	0	8	1	744	492	+252	34	Advance to finals series
5	Sydney Roosters	24	16	0	8	1	630	489	+141	34	Advance to finals series
6	Parramatta Eels	24	15	0	9	1	566	457	+109	32	Advance to finals series
7	Newcastle Knights	24	12	0	12	1	428	571	−143	26	Advance to finals series
8	Gold Coast Titans	24	10	0	14	1	580	583	−3	22	Advance to finals series
9	Cronulla-Sutherland Sharks	24	10	0	14	1	520	556	−36	22	
10	Canberra Raiders	24	10	0	14	1	481	578	−97	22	
11	St. George Illawarra Dragons	24	8	0	16	1	474	616	−142	18	
12	New Zealand Warriors	24	8	0	16	1	453	624	−171	18	
13	Wests Tigers	24	8	0	16	1	500	714	−214	18	
14	Brisbane Broncos	24	7	0	17	1	446	695	−249	16	
15	North Queensland Cowboys	24	7	0	17	1	460	748	−288	16	
16	Canterbury-Bankstown Bulldogs (W)	24	3	0	21	1	340	710	−370	8	

Updated to match(es) played on 5 September 2021. Source: 2021 NRL Ladder
(M) Minor premiers; (P) Premiers; (W) Wooden spoon

=== Pre-season ===
Date	Round	Opponent	Venue	Score	Tries	Goals	Attendance
Sun 28 February 5:00pm	3	Wests Tigers	Leichhardt Oval	52-18	K. Wakes, B.Trbojevic, J. Schuster	R. Garrick (1/1), T. Funa (2/2)	5,212

=== Regular season ===
2021 Manly-Warringah Sea Eagles NRL fixtures
Date	Round	Opponent	Venue	Score	Tries	Goals	Field Goals	Attendance
Sat 13 March 5:30pm	1	Sydney Roosters	Sydney Cricket Ground	46-4	R. Garrick	R. Garrick (0/1)		15,097
Sat 20 March 5:30pm	2	South Sydney Rabbitohs	Brookvale Oval	12-26	L. Croker, M. Taupau	R. Garrick (2/2)		3,218
Fri 26 March 6:00pm	3	St. George Illawarra Dragons	WIN Stadium	38-12	R. Garrick, D. Cherry-Evans	R. Garrick (2/2)		9,253
Thu 1 April 8:05pm	4	Penrith Panthers	Brookvale Oval	6-46	C. Cust	R. Garrick (1/1)		6,076
Fri 9 April 6:00pm	5	New Zealand Warriors	Central Coast Stadium*	12-13	J. Saab, J. Schuster	R. Garrick (2/2)	D. Cherry-Evans	4,982
Sat 17 April 3:00pm	6	Gold Coast Titans	Glen Willow Oval	36-0	B. Parker, R. Garrick (2), T. Trbojevic, J. Saab (2)	R. Garrick (6/7)		6,380
Sun 25 April 1:45pm	7	Wests Tigers	Bankwest Stadium	6-40	D. Cherry-Evans (2), M. Taupau, T. Trbojevic, R. Garrick, J. Saab, K. Foran	R. Garrick (5/7)		14,095
Sat 1 May 3:00pm	8	Penrith Panthers	Carrington Park	28-16	T. Trbojevic, D. Cherry-Evans, J. Saab	R. Garrick (1/1), D. Cherry-Evans (1/3)		5,798
Sun 9 May 2:00pm	9	New Zealand Warriors	Brookvale Oval	38-32	T. Trbojevic (2), M. Harper, J. Saab (3), R. Garrick	R. Garrick (5/8)		6,726
Fri 14 May 8:05pm	10	Brisbane Broncos	Suncorp Stadium	50-6	T. Trbojevic (2), S. Keppie, J. Saab, J. Trbojevic, L. Croker, J. Schuster	R. Garrick (9/9)		41,367
Sun 23 May 4:05pm	11	Parramatta Eels	Bankwest Stadium	6-28	B.Parker (2), K.Lawton, R. Garrick, T. Trbojevic	R. Garrick (4/5)		24,411
Sun 30 May 4:05pm	12	Newcastle Knights	McDonald Jones Stadium	18-10	B. Parker, J. Saab	R. Garrick (1/2)		17,348
	13	Bye						
Fri 11 June 6:00pm	14	North Queensland Cowboys	Brookvale Oval	50-18	B. Parker (2), H. Olakau'atu (2), K. Lawton, L, Croker, K. Foran, R. Garrick, D. Walker	R. Garrick (7/9)		6,801
Sun 20 June 4:05pm	15	Gold Coast Titans	Cbus Super Stadium	24-56	T. Trbojevic (3), J. Saab (2), R. Garrick (4), H. Olakau'atu, D. Cherry-Evans	R. Garrick (6/11)		14,408
Sat 3 July 3:00pm	16	Canterbury-Bankstown Bulldogs	Bankwest Stadium	0-66	R. Garrick (2), T. Trbojevic (3), T. Sipley (2), K. Lawton, J. Saab (3)	R. Garrick (11/11)		0
Thu 8 July 7:50pm	17	Canberra Raiders	Brookvale Oval	16-30	D. Walker, H. Olakau'atu, M. Suli	R. Garrick (2/3)		0
Fri 16 July 7:55pm	18	St. George Illawarra Dragons	Cbus Super Stadium**	32-18	M. Harper, H. Olakau'atu, K. Foran, C. Cust, B. Parker	R. Garrick (6/6)		15,038
Sat 24 July 5:30pm	19	Wests Tigers	Suncorp Stadium**	44-24	M. Harper (3), L. Croker, D. Cherry-Evans (2), T. Trbojevic, D. Walker	R. Garrick (6/8)		5,071
Mon 2 August 8:05pm	20	Cronulla-Sutherland Sharks	Suncorp Stadium**	_{22-40}	_{J. Saab (2), M. Harper, T. Trbojevic (3), R. Garrick}	_{R. Garrick (6/7)}		_{0}
Sat 7 August 7:35pm	21	Melbourne Storm	Suncorp Stadium**	18-28	J, Saab, R. Garrick (2)	R. Garrick (3/4)		0
Sat 14 August 7:35pm	22	Parramatta Eels	Sunshine Coast Stadium**	56-10	B. Parker, R. Garrick (3), T. Trbojevic, D. Walker, J. Saab, M. Suli (2), H. Olakau'atu	R. Garrick (8/10)		3,613
Fri 20 August 6:00pm	23	Canberra Raiders	Suncorp Stadium**	18-19	H. Olakau'atu, M. Harper, C. Sironen	R. Garrick (3/3)	D. Cherry-Evans	6,181
Sun 29 August 2:00pm	24	Canterbury-Bankstown Bulldogs	Moreton Daily Stadium**	36-18	J. Saab (2), H. Olakau'atu, T. Trbojevic	R. Garrick (6/7)		4,910
Sat 4 September 5:30pm	25	North Queensland Cowboys	Queensland Country Bank Stadium	18-46	J. Saab, J. Trbojevic (2), T. Trbojevic (3), R. Garrick, D. Cherry-Evans	R. Garrick (7/8)		14,336

=== Finals Series ===
2021 Manly-Warringah Sea Eagles Finals Campaign
Date	Final	Opponent	Venue	Score	Tries	Goals	Field Goals	Attendance
Fri 10 September 7:50pm	Qualifying Final	Melbourne Storm	Sunshine Coast Stadium	40-12	J. Saab (2)	R.Garrick (2/2)		9,120
Fri 17 September 7:50pm	Semi Final	Sydney Roosters	BB Print Stadium	42-6	T. Trbojevic (2), K. Foran, D. Cherry-Evans, M. Harper, D.Walker, J. Saab	R. Garrick (7/7)		5,824
Fri 17 September 7:50pm	Preliminary Final	South Sydney Rabbitohs	Suncorp Stadium	36-16	R. Garrick (2), T. Trbojevic	R. Garrick (2/3)		26,249

*Game relocated due to border restrictions between Australia and New Zealand

**Game relocated due to the new COVID-19 outbreak in Sydney

== Records/honours ==
- In Round 22, Reuben Garrick beat Matthew Ridge's record for most points scored in a season for the club with the Ridge's record being 255. Garrick now sits at 268 points with another three weeks remaining in the regular season and then the finals series
- In Round 25 Garrick beat the all-time points record in a regular season passing Hazem El Masri's record of 288 with 304 points
- That also means that Garrick was the first player to score more than 300 points in a regular season
- In the Preliminary Finals, Tom Trbojevic broke the club's record for most tries in a season by an individual player scoring 28 tries passing Phil Blake's record of 27 tries in the 1983 season

== Club awards ==
- Roy Bull Best And Fairest: Tom Trbojevic
- NRL Players' Player: Tom Trbojevic
- Most Tries: Tom Trbojevic
- Gordon Willoughby Medallion (Best player voted by Members): Tom Trbojevic
- Most Points: Reuben Garrick
- Ken Arthurson Rising Star Award: Josh Schuster and Jason Saab
- Steve Menzies Play Of The Year Award: Reuben Garrick
- Doug Daley Clubman Of The Year: Toafofoa Sipley
- NRL Club Community Award: Sean Keppie

== Dally M Awards for Manly players ==
- Dally M Player Of The Year: Tom Trbojevic
- Fullback Of The Year: Tom Trbojevic
- Winger Of The Year: Reuben Garrick
- Top Point Scorer: Reuben Garrick
- Try Of The Year: Tom Trbojevic
