= Manly pride jersey player boycott =

Boycott in 2022

The Manly pride jersey player boycott took place in July 2022, after seven players for the Australian National Rugby League club Manly Warringah Sea Eagles announced they would refuse to participate in an upcoming match based upon the team's decision to wear LGBT pride themed jerseys in the 28 July match. The players received both criticism and support for the boycott.

== Boycott ==
In July 2022 seven players from the Australian National Rugby League club Manly Warringah Sea Eagles refused to wear a pride jersey and chose to boycott the club's match against the Sydney Roosters on 28 July. The club had decided to use the jersey as a means of supporting diversity and inclusivity in the NRL, but did not inform the players prior to unveiling it before the media. The seven players – Josh Aloiai, Toafofoa Sipley, Tolutau Koula, Christian Tuipulotu, Haumole Olakau'atu, Jason Saab and Josh Schuster – cited "cultural and religious" reasons for doing so. An eighth player, Ray Vaega also pulled out after he was asked to fill in – declining what would have been his NRL debut.

Manly lost the game against the Roosters 20–10, while the seven players did not attend the match due to security concerns.

== Reactions ==
Public reaction to the boycott was mixed. Some fans praised the players for standing up for their beliefs, while others labeled them bigoted and hypocritical. The players received support from religious leaders. Manly coach Des Hasler apologised to the players for the club's failure to consult with them, and noted that the players were "strong in their beliefs and convictions."

It was reported by NRL broadcaster Channel Nine's Wide World of Sports that a young Sea Eagles player who is a closeted homosexual was devastated by the decision of the seven players: "This move by the players has shocked him. He thought they would accept him for who he is if he ever decided to make his sexual preferences public - clearly that is not the case." Radio personality and former NRL "enforcer" Mark Geyer said that the players were hypocritical, because their club's sponsor Pointsbet promotes gambling, and that they were insulting former Sea Eagles great Ian Roberts, the only Australian professional rugby league player to come out as gay. Roberts himself said, "I fully respect those players who are choosing not to play, and their right not to play, with their religious beliefs."

Six of the seven players were of Pacific Islander heritage. Guy Rundle, writing for Crikey, argued that the reactions to the players included "implicit and explicit condescending racism".

The boycott had a negative effect on the Sea Eagles' season. Simon Brunsdon, writing for Nine's Wide World of Sports, notes that Manly "were destined to play finals, though, until the round 19 (sic) rainbow jersey fiasco, after which the club did not win an NRL game." Hasler attempted to sue Manly after he was sacked by the club at season's end, eventually reaching an out of court settlement.
