= Aitasi James =

New Zealand rugby league player

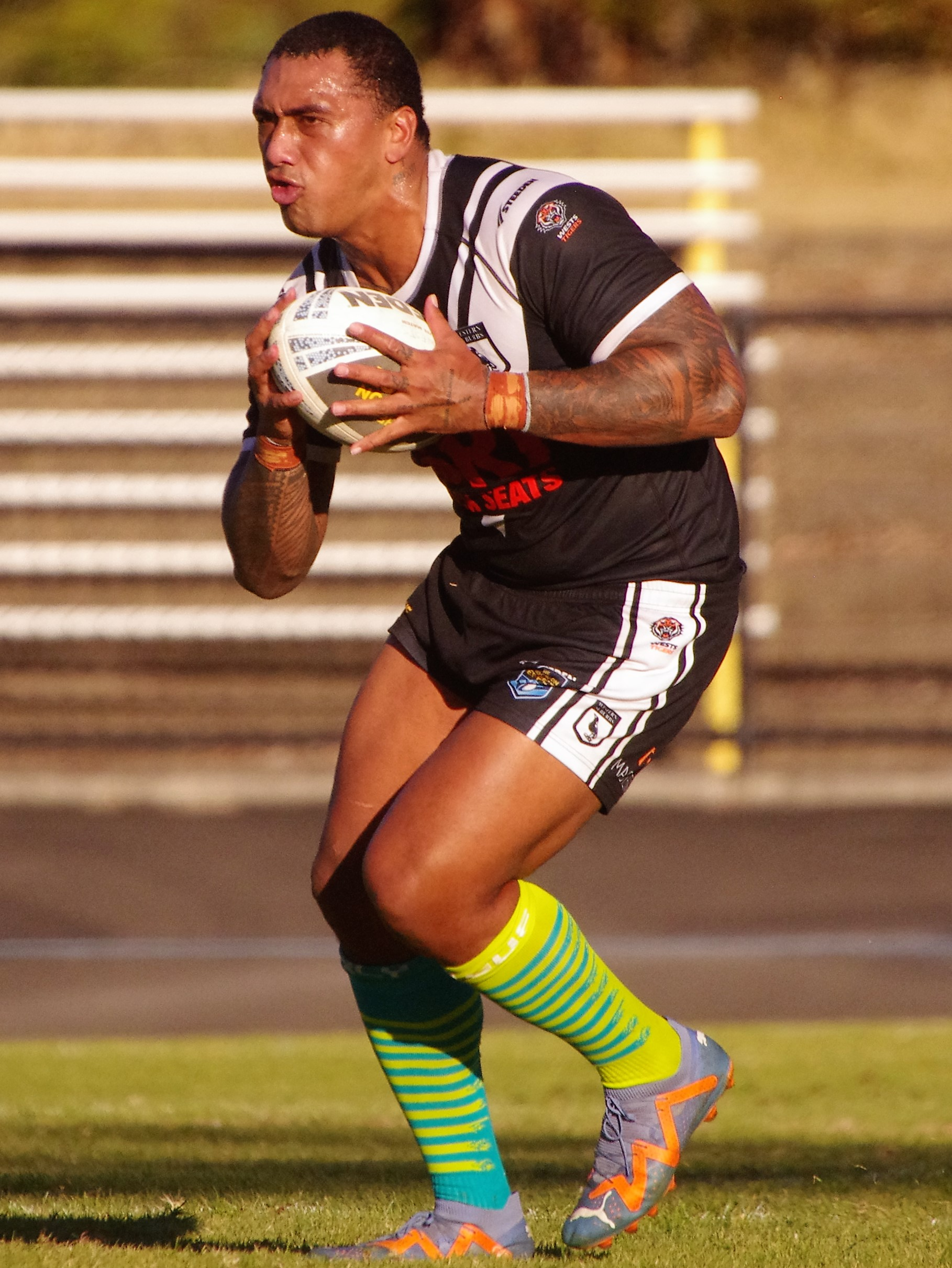

Personal information
- Full name: Aitasi James
- Born: 17 November 2000 (age 25) Auckland, New Zealand
- Height: 188 cm (6 ft 2 in)
- Weight: 110 kg (17 st 5 lb)

Playing information
- Position: Prop, Lock
Club
Years	Team	Pld	T	G	FG	P
2023	Wests Tigers	5	0	0	0	0
2024	Manly Sea Eagles	1	0	0	0	0
2026–	North Qld Cowboys	0	0	0	0	0
	Total	6	0	0	0	0

Aitasi James (born 17 November 2000) is a New Zealand rugby league footballer who plays as a prop for the North Sydney Bears in the NSW Cup.

He previously played for the Wests Tigers in the National Rugby League (NRL).

== Background ==
James was born in Auckland, and was educated at Hills Sports High School in Sydney.

== Playing career ==
James joined the Parramatta Eels in 2021. In 2022, he joined the Wests Tigers, spending the season in the New South Wales Cup competition.

James made his first grade debut for the Wests Tigers from the bench in his side's 36−12 loss to the Cronulla-Sutherland Sharks at Western Sydney Stadium in round 19 of the 2023 NRL season.

=== 2025 ===
On 9 July, James signed with the North Sydney Bears for the rest of the season.
