= Austin Dias =

NZ rugby league footballer

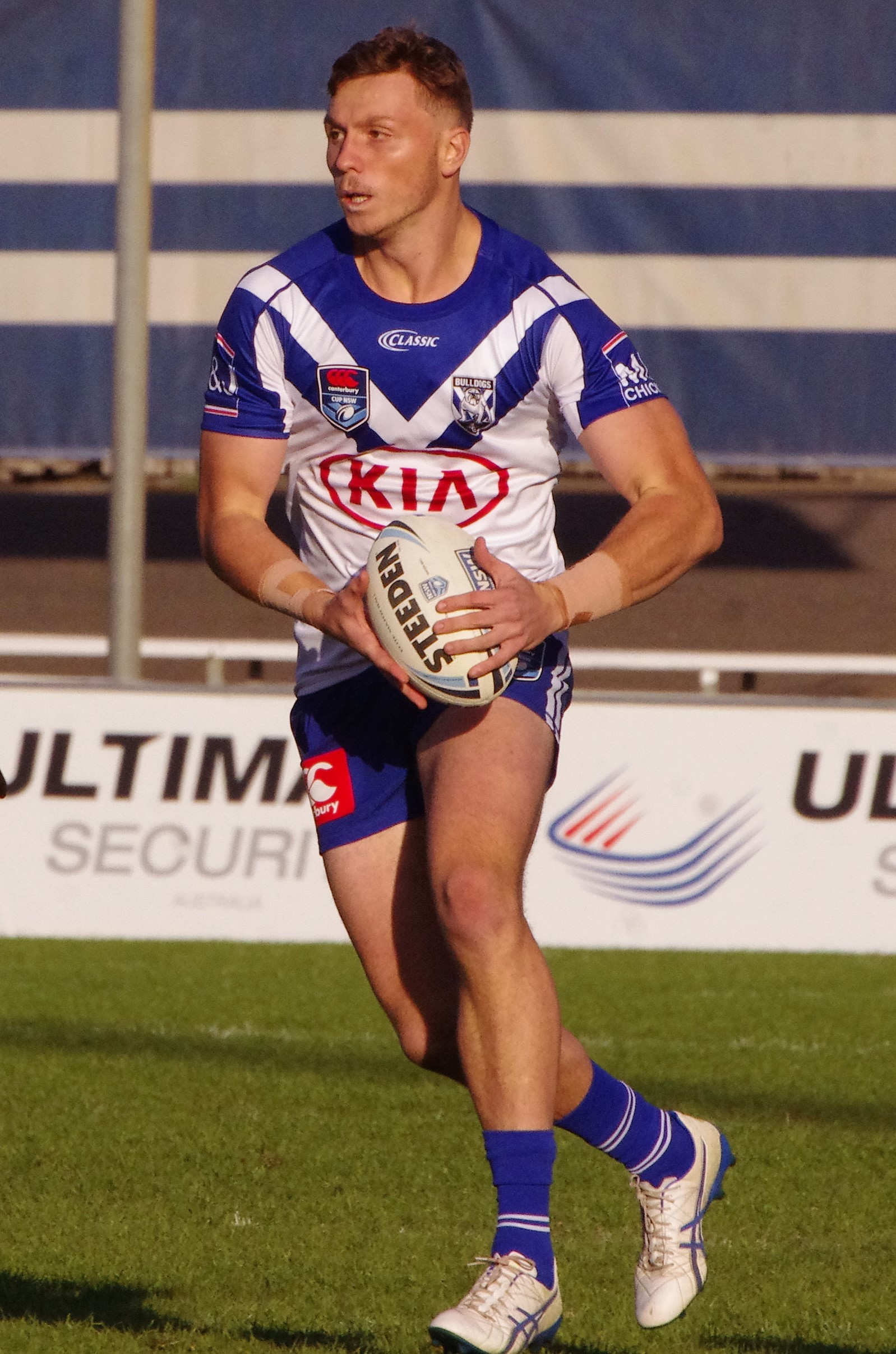

Personal information
- Full name: Austin Dias
- Born: 20 May 1998 (age 27) New Zealand
- Height: 198 cm (6 ft 6 in)
- Weight: 107 kg (16 st 12 lb)

Playing information
- Position: Prop
Club
Years	Team	Pld	T	G	FG	P
2022	Wests Tigers	8	0	0	0	0
2025	Penrith Panthers	1	0	0	0	0
	Total	9	0	0	0	0
Representative
Years	Team	Pld	T	G	FG	P
2023	Māori All Stars	1	0	0	0	0
- Source: As of 10 July 2022

Austin Dias (born 20 May 1998) is a New Zealand rugby league footballer who played as a prop for the Penrith Panthers in the National Rugby League.

He previously played for the Wests Tigers in the NRL and played for Manly Warringah Sea Eagles in the NSW Cup

== Background ==
Dias played his junior rugby league for Taniwharau Rugby League Club. He is of Portuguese and Maori descent.

Dias is a committed Christian.

== Career ==
=== Wests Tigers ===
Dias made his first grade debut for the Wests Tigers against the New Zealand Warriors in round 16 of the 2022 NRL season, Wests would go on to lose the match 22-2. Dias became Wests Tigers player no. 258. Dias and the Wests Tigers won their round 20 fixture against the Broncos 32-18 in Brisbane. Dias played a total of eight games for the Wests Tigers in the 2022 NRL season as the club finished bottom of the table and claimed the Wooden Spoon for the first time.

=== Manly-Warringah ===
On 21 October 2022, Dias signed a one-year contract to join Manly-Warringah ahead of the 2023 season. Manly have re-signed Dias for the 2024 NRL season.

=== Penrith Panthers ===
In round 26 of the 2025 NRL season, Dias made his club debut for Penrith against the Canterbury-Bankstown Bulldogs at Stadium Australia. He became Penrith player number #632. On 9 September, it was announced that Dias would be departing Penrith at the end of the 2025 NRL season after not being offered a new contract by the club.

=== Representative honours ===
In February 2023, Dias was selected to represent the Māori All Stars in a match against the Indigenous All Stars.
