= Alfred Smalley =

Niue international rugby league footballer

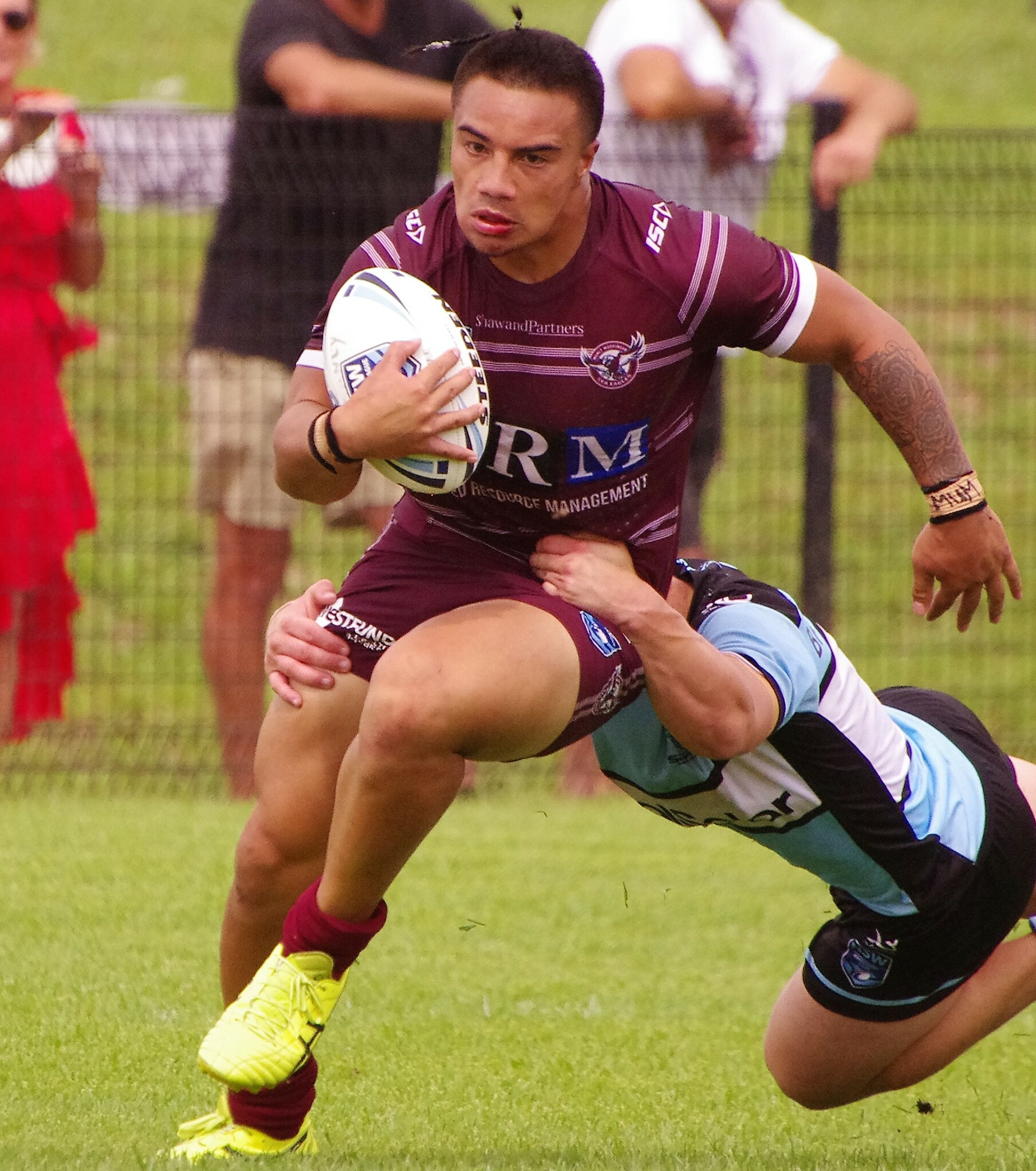

Personal information
- Full name: Alfred Smalley
- Born: 4 June 1999 (age 25); Auckland, New Zealand
- Height: 179 cm (5 ft 10 in)
- Weight: 96 kg (15 st 2 lb)

Playing information
- Position: Wing, Centre
Club
Years	Team	Pld	T	G	FG	P
2022	Manly Sea Eagles	2	1	0	0	4
Representative
Years	Team	Pld	T	G	FG	P
2017	Niue	1	0	0	0	0
- Source: As of 11 August 2022

Alfred Smalley (born 4 June 1999) is a Niue international rugby league footballer who plays as a winger or centre for the Parramatta Eels in the NSW Cup.

He previously played for the Manly-Warringah Sea Eagles in the NRL.

== Playing career ==
=== 2022 ===
Smalley made his first grade debut in round 20 of the 2022 NRL season for Manly against the Sydney Roosters scoring a try in a 20-10 loss. Made his 2nd appearance against the Sharks in Manly's 40-6 loss. In November, Smalley signed a contract to join North Sydney in the NSW Cup.

=== 2023 ===
Smalley spent the entire 2023 season playing for North Sydney in the NSW Cup. Smalley played in North Sydney's 22-18 NSW Cup grand final loss against South Sydney. Smalley scored the opening try of the match.

=== 2025 ===
In 2025, Smalley joined Parramatta's NSW Cup side.
