= Gordon Chan Kum Tong =

Samoa international rugby league footballer

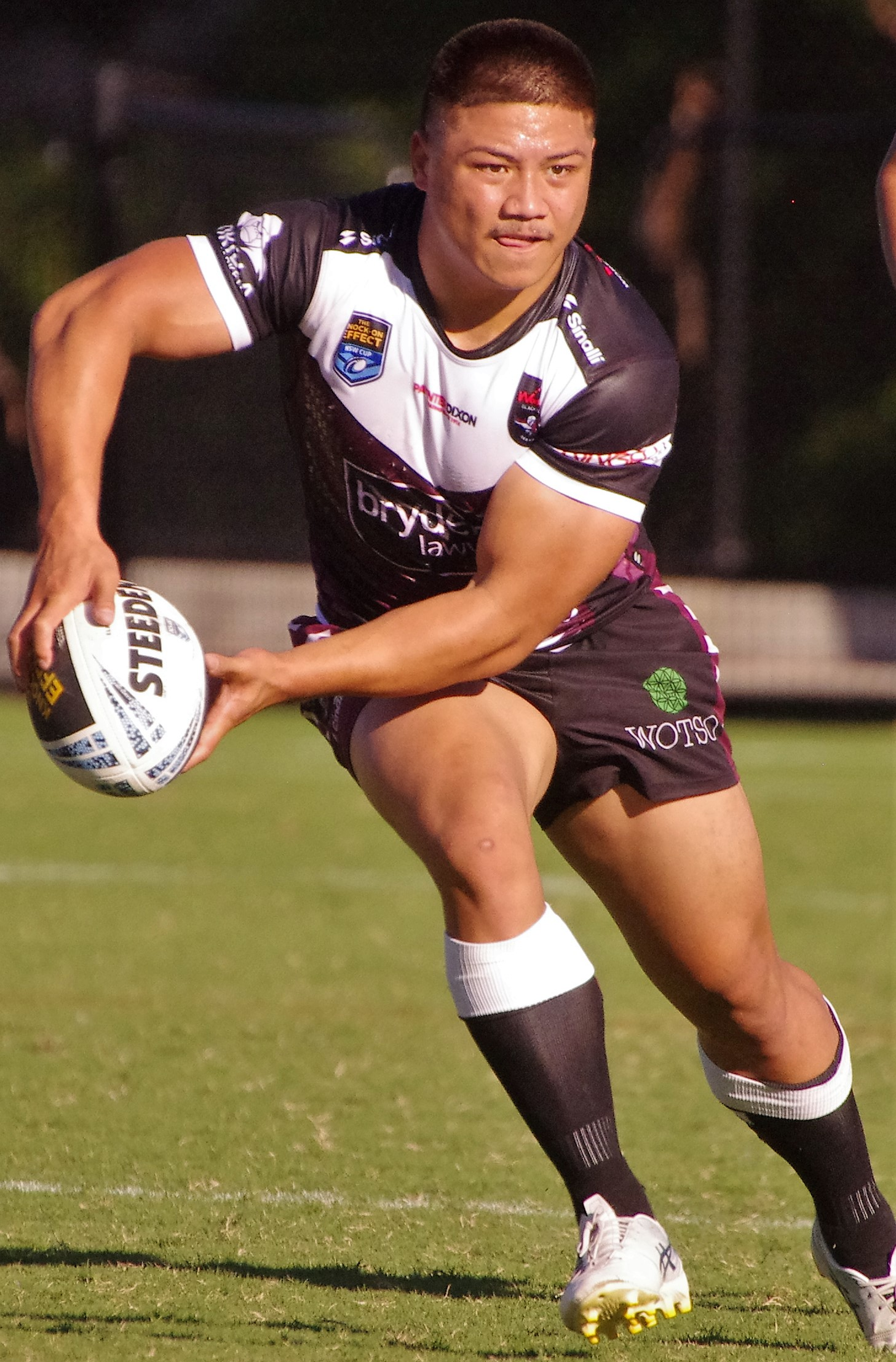

Personal information
- Full name: Gordon Chan Kum Tong
- Born: 3 January 2002 (age 24) Sydney, New South Wales, Australia
- Height: 173 cm (5 ft 8 in)
- Weight: 92 kg (14 st 7 lb)

Playing information
- Position: Hooker
Club
Years	Team	Pld	T	G	FG	P
2023–25	Manly Sea Eagles	14	1	1	0	6
2026–	Canterbury Bulldogs	1	0	0	0	0
	Total	15	1	1	0	6
Representative
Years	Team	Pld	T	G	FG	P
2023–24	Samoa	4	1	0	0	4
- Source: As of 18 July 2026

Gordon Chan Kum Tong (born 3 January 2002) is a Samoa international rugby league footballer who plays as a hooker for the Canterbury-Bankstown Bulldogs in the NRL.

He previously played for the Manly Warringah Sea Eagles.

== Playing career ==
=== Early career ===
Chan was originally a Canterbury junior from the Bankstown Bulls junior club. He then joined the Manly Harold Matthews Cup junior representative team. He later played for the Blacktown Workers Sea Eagles NSW Cup side. He also has a nickname of GCKT. He is of Samoan and Chinese descent.

=== Manly Warringah Sea Eagles ===
Chan made his first grade debut on round 26 of the 2023 NRL season, and converted a penalty kick for the Manly club in their 42–24 win against Canterbury.

=== 2024 ===
In July 2024, Chan re-signed with the club until the end of the 2025 season. He played ten games for Manly in the 2024 NRL season as they finished 7th on the table and qualified for the finals. Manly would be eliminated in the second week of the finals by the Sydney Roosters.

=== 2025 ===
During Manly's round 2 loss against the New Zealand Warriors, the NRL announced that it was investigating an incident between Manly player Chan and a member of the public in the crowd, after a video came out with Chan confronting the fan. Chan was later cleared of any wrongdoing. Chan was one of nine players that Manly farewelled during their final match of the season. He only made two appearances for Manly throughout the year spending the majority with the clubs reserve grade team. On 10 November, it was announced that Chan had signed with the Canterbury-Bankstown Bulldogs on a development contract for 2026, moving to the Top 30 in 2027.

== Statistics ==
Year	Team	Games	Tries	Goals	Pts
2023	Manly Warringah Sea Eagles	2	1	1	6
2024	Manly Warringah Sea Eagles	10			
2025	Manly Warringah Sea Eagles	2			
2026	Canterbury-Bankstown Bulldogs	1			
	Totals	15	1	1	6
