= Ray Vaega =

New Zealand rugby league footballer

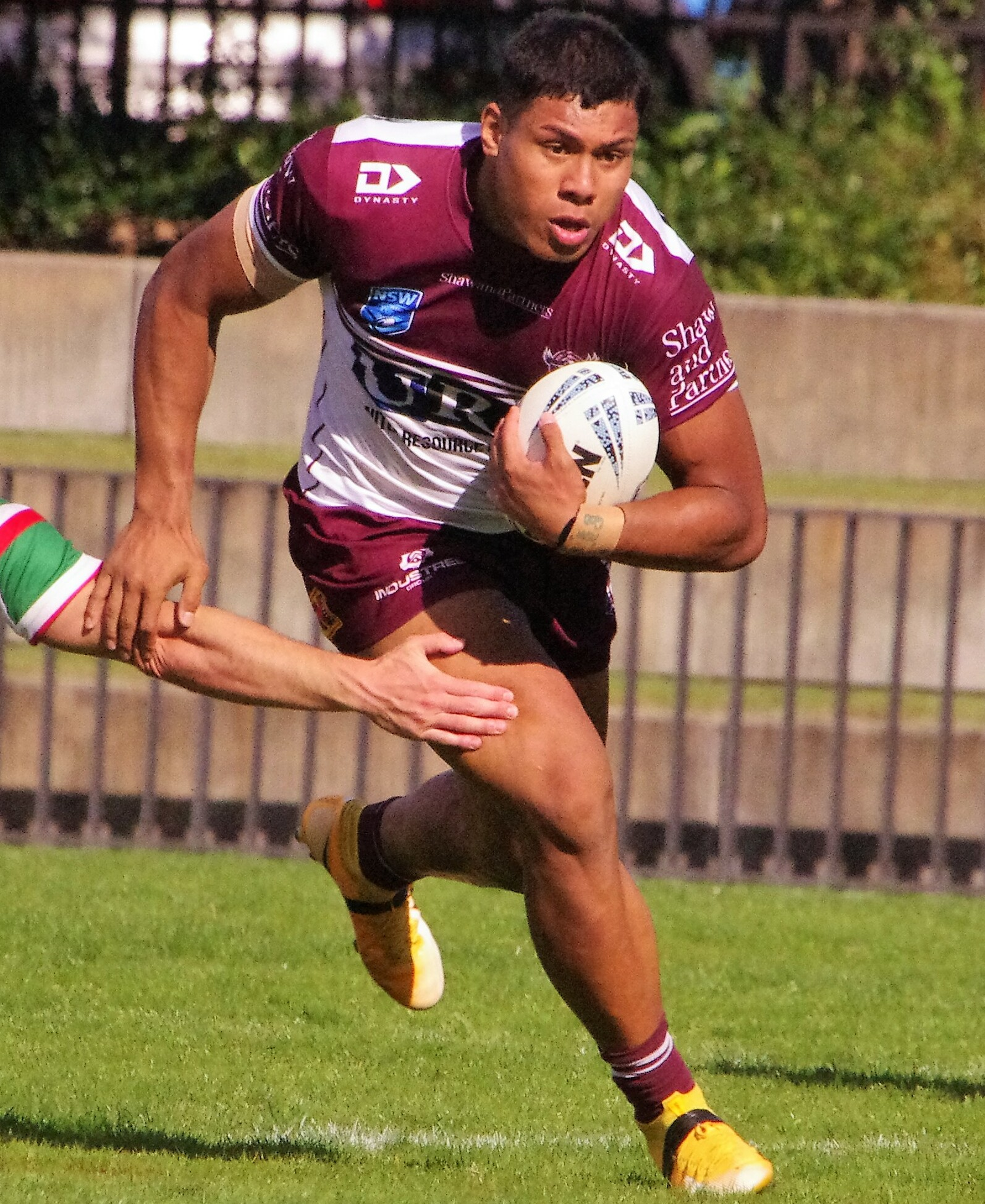

Personal information
- Full name: Raymond Tuaimalo Vaega
- Born: 22 April 2000 (age 26) Auckland, New Zealand
- Height: 182 cm (6 ft 0 in)
- Weight: 102 kg (16 st 1 lb)

Playing information
- Position: Wing
Club
Years	Team	Pld	T	G	FG	P
2022–24	Manly Sea Eagles	12	3	0	0	12
- Source: As of 24 May 2024

Raymond Tuaimalo Vaega (born 22 April 2000) is a New Zealand professional rugby league footballer who plays as a winger for the North Sydney Bears the NSW Cup.

In round 24 of the 2022 NRL season, Vaega made his debut for Manly against the Canberra Raiders after previously turning down the chance to debut in Round 20 due to the Manly pride jersey player boycott. Vaega played seven times for Manly in the 2023 NRL season and scored two tries as the club missed the finals. Vaega re-signed with Manly on a one year extension. On 8 September 2025, it was announced that Vaega had been released by Manly after not being offered a new contract.

In October 2025, it was announced that Vaega had signed a one year deal to play for the North Sydney Bears in NSW Cup.
