= Jason Saab =

Lebanon international rugby league footballer (born 2000)

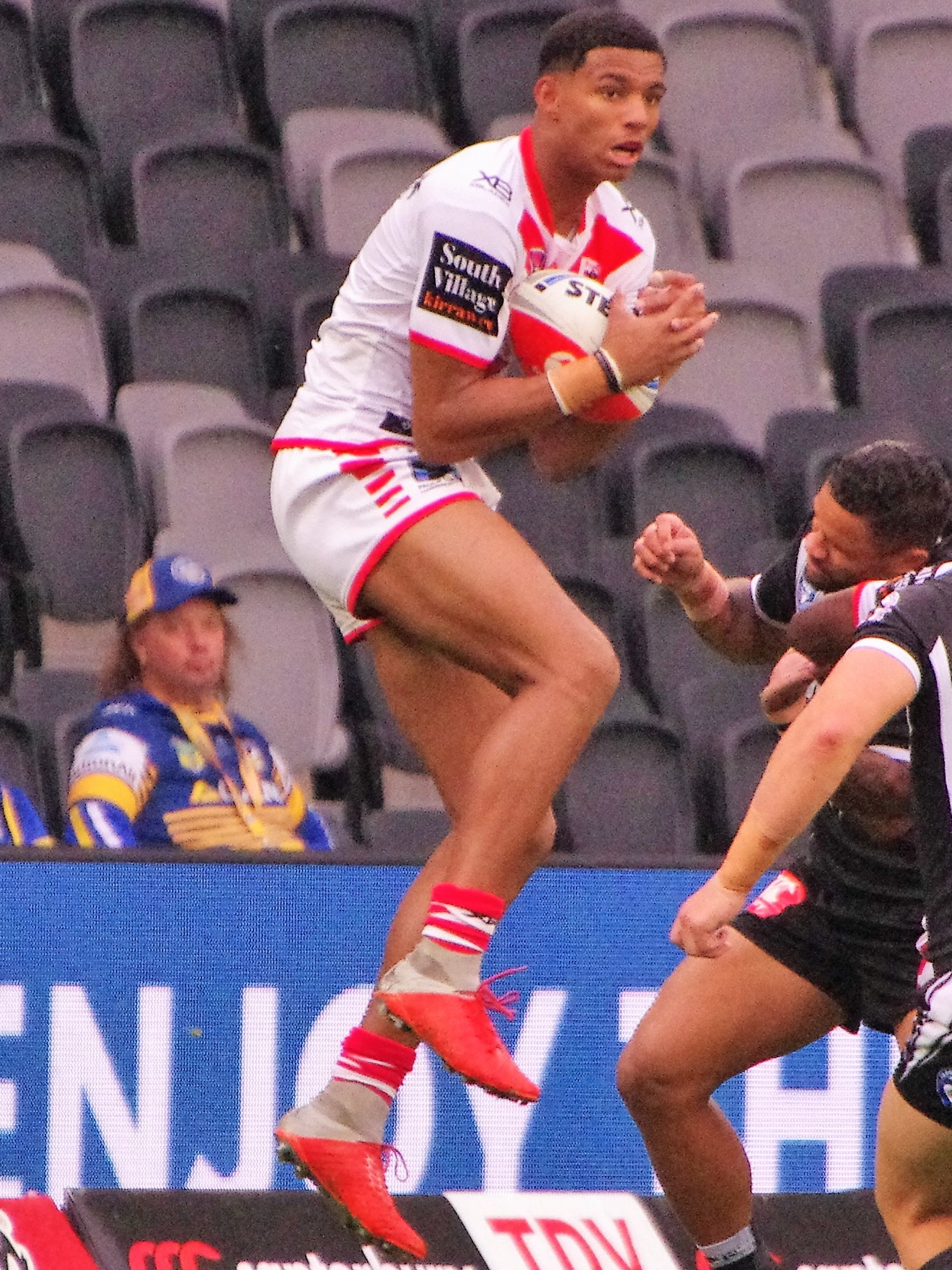

Personal information
- Born: 8 October 2000 (age 26) Sydney, New South Wales, Australia
- Height: 199 cm (6 ft 6 in)
- Weight: 101 kg (15 st 13 lb)

Playing information
- Position: Wing
Club
Years	Team	Pld	T	G	FG	P
2019–20	St. George Illawarra	7	4	0	0	16
2021–	Manly Sea Eagles	122	84	0	0	336
	Total	129	88	0	0	352
Representative
Years	Team	Pld	T	G	FG	P
2025	Prime Minister's XIII	1	0	0	0	0
2026–	Lebanon	3	0	0	0	0
- Source: As of 6 November 2026

Jason Saab (born 8 October 2000) is a Lebanon international rugby league footballer who plays as a winger for the Manly Warringah Sea Eagles in the National Rugby League.

He is known for his lightning quick pace and quick finishing.

He previously played for the St. George Illawarra Dragons in the NRL.

== Background ==
Saab was born in Sydney, New South Wales, and is of Nigerian and Indigenous Australian descent. Saab's step-father is Lebanese, hence his surname.

Saab played his junior rugby league for the Merrylands Rams, for Parramatta City Titans and Carlingford Cougars.

Saab attended Westfields Sports High School. and graduated in 2018.

In 2018, Saab was picked for the Australian Schoolboys rugby league team and represented Australia in London, United Kingdom

== Career ==
=== 2019 ===
Saab made his first grade debut in Round 19 of the 2019 NRL season for the St. George Illawarra Dragons against South Sydney, starting on the wing and scoring two tries in their 20–16 loss in the last minute due to a Campbell Graham try at ANZ Stadium.

=== 2020 ===
In August 2020, Sporting News reported that Saab had sought an early release from his contract due to the traveling distance between Wollongong and his home in Western Sydney. However, St. George Illawarra refused this request unless the club would be compensated either by cash or player transfer. In September, there was speculation that Saab would be joining the Manly-Warringah Sea Eagles as a trade for St. George junior Reuben Garrick.

Saab made only four appearances for St. George in the 2020 NRL season as the club finished 13th on the table.

On 26 November 2020, Saab was granted a release from his contract with St. George and shortly thereafter signed a three-year deal with Manly-Warringah.

=== 2021 ===
In round 1 of the 2021 NRL season, Saab made his debut for Manly-Warringah in the club's 46–4 loss against the Sydney Roosters. In round 6 of the 2021 NRL season, he scored two tries in Manly's 36–0 victory over the Gold Coast.

In round 9 of the 2021 NRL season, Saab scored a hat-trick in Manly's 38–32 victory over New Zealand Warriors.

In round 10 of the 2021 NRL season, Saab scored another two tries for Manly-Warringah in a 50–6 victory over Brisbane at Suncorp Stadium.

In round 15, Saab scored two tries for Manly in a 56–24 victory over the Gold Coast. The following week, he scored a hat-trick in Manly's 66–0 victory over Canterbury.

In round 20, Saab scored two tries for Manly in their 40–22 victory over rivals Cronulla in the battle of the beaches match.

At the end of year club awards night, Jason Saab and Josh Schuster were announced as joint winners of the Ken Arthurson Rising Star Award for 2021 after their strong seasons for Manly.

=== 2022 ===
In round 18 of the 2022 NRL season, Saab scored two tries in a 42–12 victory over Newcastle. Saab was one of seven players involved in the Manly pride jersey player boycott. Saab made 16 appearances for Manly in the 2022 NRL season scoring seven tries. Manly would finish the season in 11th place on the table.

=== 2023 ===
In round 6 of the 2023 NRL season, Saab made his return to the Manly side in their 44–12 loss against Penrith with Saab scoring a second half try. In round 25, Saab scored a hat-trick in Manly's 29–22 loss against the New Zealand Warriors. In round 27, Saab scored two tries in Manly's 54–12 victory over the Wooden Spoon side Wests Tigers. Saab played 19 matches for Manly in the 2023 NRL season and scored 14 tries as the club finished 12th on the table and missed the finals.

=== 2024 ===
Saab played for Manly in the opening game of the 2024 NRL season against South Sydney at the Allegiant Stadium in Las Vegas, Nevada as part of the NRL in Las Vegas opener for the 2024 season. He scored a long range intercept try before halftime, but near the end of the game suffered a hamstring injury that would ultimately see him miss the next 5 weeks. A caption shown on the television broadcast of the game said that Saab, long believed to be one of the quickest players in the NRL (if not the quickest), had a fastest recorded time of 10.67 for the 100 metre sprint (Manly teammate Tolu Koula holds the NSW GPS (General Public Schools) 100m record at 10.58 set in 2019)

On 4 June 2024, Saab re-signed with Manly until the end of the 2029 season. In round 18 of the 2024 NRL season, Saab scored a hat-trick in Manly's 21-20 golden point extra-time victory over North Queensland. Saab played 17 matches for Manly in the 2024 NRL season and scored 12 tries as they finished 7th on the table and qualified for the finals. Manly would be eliminated in the second week of the finals by the Sydney Roosters.

=== 2025 ===
In round 11 of the 2025 NRL season, Saab scored two tries for Manly in their 24–6 victory over North Queensland. In round 21, Saab played his 100th first grade game in Manly's heavy loss against Canterbury. Saab played 20 games for Manly in the 2025 NRL season as the club finished 10th on the table.

On 12 October 2025 he made his debut for the Prime Minister's XIII in the 28–10 win over PNG Prime Minister's XIII in Port Moresby

=== 2026 ===
In round 11 of the 2026 NRL season, Saab scored a hat-trick in Manly's 46-18 win over the Wests Tigers. Saab played 23 games for Manly in the 2026 NRL season as the club finished 9th on the table.

He made his Lebanon international début in the 2026 Rugby League World Cup 42-18 defeat to Papua New Guinea on 17 October 2026.

== Statistics ==
Year	Team	Games	Tries	Pts
2019	St. George Illawarra Dragons	3	3	12
2020	St. George Illawarra Dragons	4	1	4
2021	Manly Warringah Sea Eagles	27	26	104
2022	Manly Warringah Sea Eagles	16	7	28
2023	Manly Warringah Sea Eagles	19	14	56
2024	Manly Warringah Sea Eagles	17	12	48
2025	Manly Warringah Sea Eagles	20	10	40
2026	Manly Warringah Sea Eagles	18	14	56
2027	Manly Warringah Sea Eagles			
	Totals	109	73	292
