= Tony Mestrov =

Australian rugby league footballer and businessman (born 1970)

Personal information
- Full name: Anthony Mestrov
- Born: 11 March 1970 (age 55); Sydney, New South Wales, Australia

Playing information
- Height: 6 ft 2 in (1.88 m)
- Weight: 17 st 10 lb (112 kg)
- Position: Prop, Second-row
Club
Years	Team	Pld	T	G	FG	P
1990–92	Manly Sea Eagles	17	1	0	0	4
1994–95	South Sydney	30	3	0	0	12
1995–97	London Broncos	30	8	0	0	32
1998–00	Wigan Warriors	84	4	0	0	16
2001	London Broncos	25	0	0	0	0
	Total	186	16	0	0	64

Tony Mestrov (born 11 March 1970) is an Australian former professional rugby league footballer who played as a prop and second-row forward in the 1990s and 2000s. He played for the Manly-Warringah Sea Eagles and the South Sydney Rabbitohs in Australia, and for the London Broncos and the Wigan Warriors in the European Super League. Mestrov was the Chief Executive Officer of Greyhound Racing New South Wales from October 2017 till July 2022.

Tony Mestrov returned as the Chief Executive Officer of Manly-Warringah Sea Eagles in August 2022.

== Early life ==
Mestrov attended St Augustine's College, Brookvale.

== Playing career ==
A local junior, Mestrov made his first-grade debut for Manly-Warringah in Round 12, 1990 against the Gold Coast Seagulls, coming off the bench in a 34–0 victory at Brookvale Oval.

In 1994, Mestrov signed for South Sydney. Mestrov was a part of the Souths team which won that year's pre-season Tooheys Challenge Cup. Mestrov played in the final in which they defeated the Brisbane Broncos 27–26 at Albury.

Mestrov played one further season for Souths before departing at the end of 1995 to move to England and take up a contract with the London Broncos. He later signed with Wigan after leaving London at the end of 1997.

Mestrov played for Wigan as a prop forward in their 1998 Super League Grand Final victory over the Leeds Rhinos, and as an interchange forward in their 2000 Super League Grand Final loss to St Helens.

In 2001, Mestrov returned to the London Broncos for one final season before retiring from the game. He has a daughter named Isabella Mestrov.
