= Josh Aloiai =

Samoa international rugby league footballer

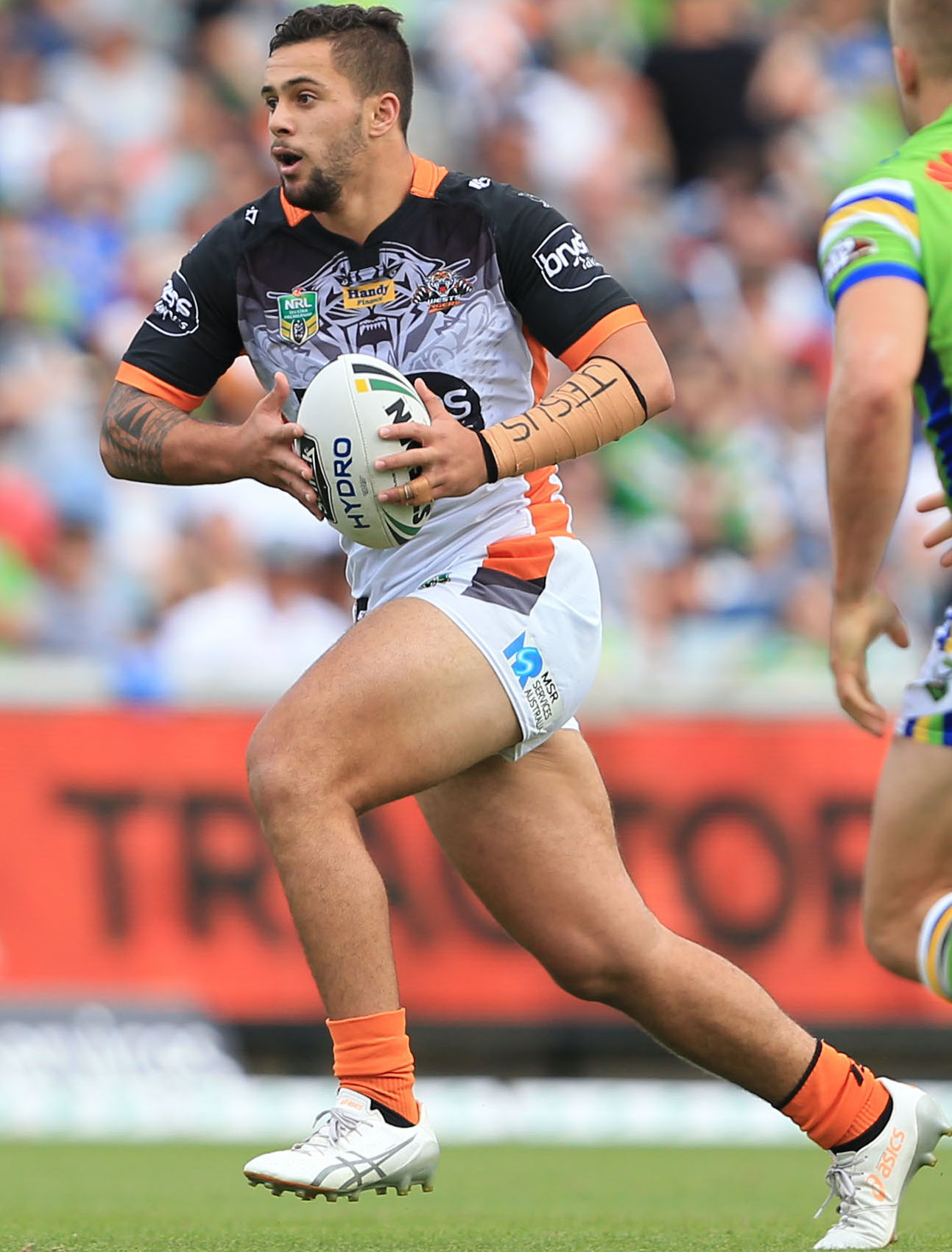

Personal information
- Full name: Joshua Aloiai
- Born: 11 November 1995 (age 31) Auckland, New Zealand
- Height: 189 cm (6 ft 2 in)
- Weight: 106 kg (16 st 10 lb)

Playing information
- Position: Prop, Second-row, Lock
Club
Years	Team	Pld	T	G	FG	P
2016–20	Wests Tigers	90	11	0	0	44
2021–25	Manly Sea Eagles	74	5	0	0	20
	Total	164	16	0	0	64
Representative
Years	Team	Pld	T	G	FG	P
2018–22	Samoa	5	1	0	0	4
- Source: As of 31 May 2025

Joshua Aloiai (born 11 November 1995) is a retired Samoan international rugby league footballer who played as a prop or lock for the Manly-Warringah Sea Eagles in the National Rugby League (NRL).

He previously played for the Wests Tigers in the NRL. He represented Samoa at international level from 2018 to 2022. He played as a second-row forward earlier in his career.

== Background ==
Aloiai was born in Auckland, New Zealand. He is of Samoan and Italian descent.

He played his junior rugby league for the Glenora Bears, before being signed by the Parramatta Eels. His father, a national jiu-jitsu champion in New Zealand, died in 2009. Later relocating to Sydney Australia aged 17, he moved in with his aunt and uncle who, he said, "took me in as if I was their own".

== Playing career ==
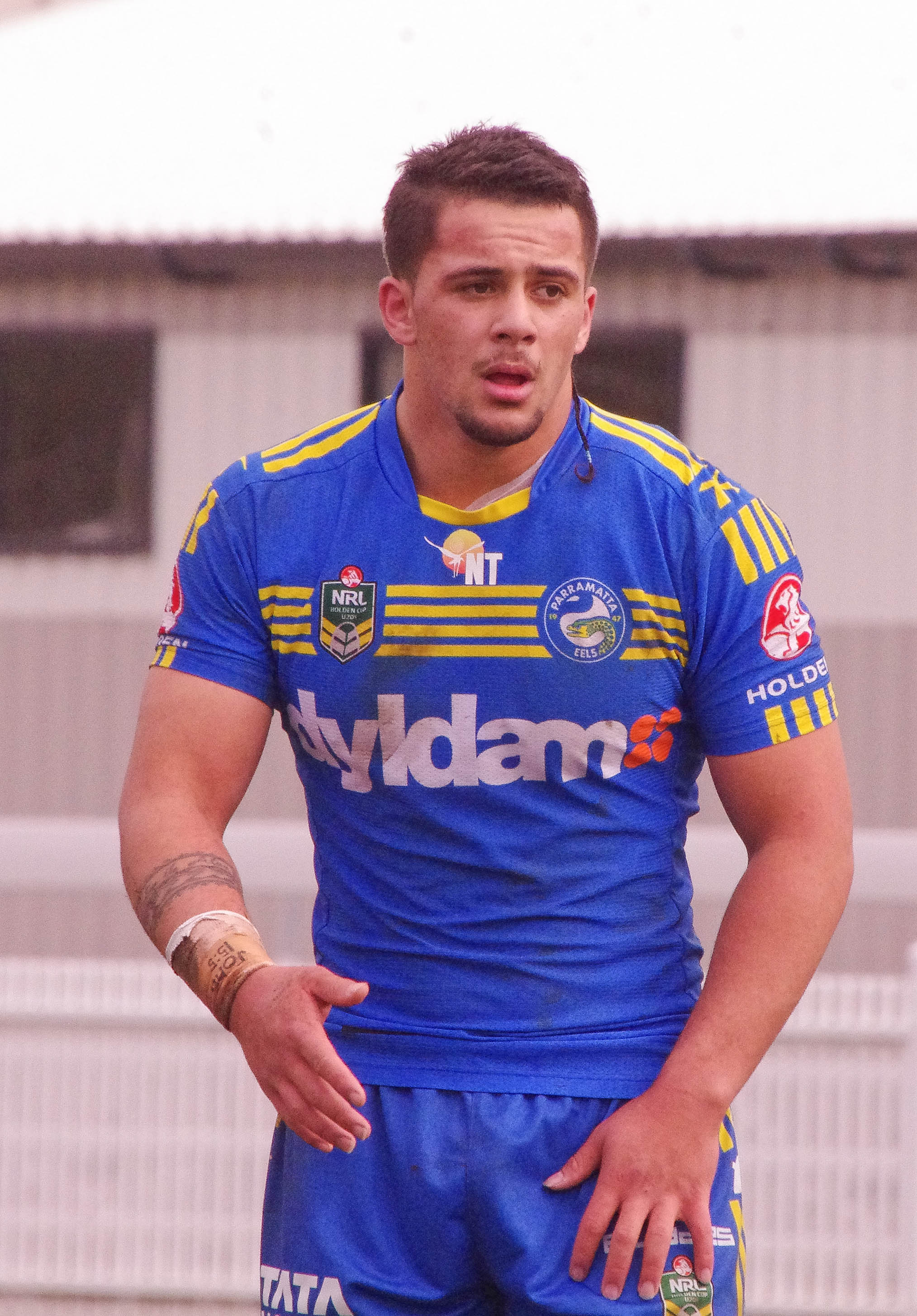
Aloiai playing for the Parramatta Eels U20s side

=== Early career ===
In 2014 and 2015, Aloiai played for the Parramatta Eels' NYC team. On 18 October 2014, he played for the Junior Kiwis against the Junior Kangaroos. His 2015 season was hampered by injury. He said, "I was running and as I was getting tackled my hip subluxed and it the process fractured my posterior wall of my hip." On 11 November, he signed a one-year contract with the Wests Tigers starting in 2016.

=== 2016 ===
Despite missing the pre-season with his hip injury, Aloiai made his NRL debut in round 1 against the New Zealand Warriors, playing off the interchange bench in the Tigers' 34–26 win at Campbelltown Stadium. He re-signed with the club for a further season soon after.

Playing as a reserve in the early weeks of the season, Aloiai progressed to the starting team from round 11 onward. He was the first Wests Tigers player to appear in every game of their rookie season. He said, "This year has definitely exceeded my expectations. I just feel really thankful and blessed how the year's gone."

=== 2017 ===
Suffering a broken jaw three weeks into the pre-season during a training session at the beach, Aloiai was hospitalised for a short time. He said, "I just copped a bit of a shot in the jaw and got a few breaks. I had surgery that week. After the Christmas break I should be practically be into everything." He signed an extension to the end of 2019 in January, saying, "It's a privilege to be able to live my dream – the players that we have here have pretty much become my brothers and we also have quality staff at the club." In round 11, Aloiai suffered a "gruesome" dislocated patella that kept him off the paddock until the last 4 games. He scored 2 tries from his 15 appearances.

Aloiai was named in the Italian team for the 2017 Rugby League World Cup. but withdrew from the team.

=== 2018 ===
Aloiai played 16 games for the Wests Tigers, mostly from the bench, and made his first appearances in the front row.

In June, he made his international debut for Samoa against Tonga. He said, "When I told my Mum she got pretty emotional, just telling me how proud my father would have been. My aunties and uncles, my dad's brothers and sisters have all messaged me along with my first cousins just saying how proud it is for the Samoan side of the family."

At season's end, Aloiai was nominated for the Ken Stephen Medal for community service. He said, "It caught me by surprise actually. A lot of the community stuff I do, whether it is through the club or in my own time, I don't do it for recognition. My achievements say a lot about my mum."

=== 2019 ===
Starting the season on the bench, Alioai was moved to lock in round 5, before finishing as starting prop from round 17. Having made 17 appearances, his season ended after round 20 due to injury. Having been effected by a wrist complaint all season, he later said, "I broke my scaphoid, got a screw in it, but the screw broke off and moved into my wrist so I had to get some other surgeries. I ended up getting a rib graft done, where they grab some rib and some cartilage and use it to reconstruct your scaphoid and your wrist. it had been about 18 months since I had a functional wrist."

=== 2020 ===
In a season shortened by COVID-19, Aloiai played 17 games, missing only two. For the first time in his career, he started at prop in every appearance. Scoring a personal best 3 tries, his stats were much improved on previous seasons. His running metres increased from an average of 94 per game in 2019 to 136 in 2020, and his tackles made and tackles missed were both the best of his career.

On 17 November, Aloiai handed in a transfer request to the Wests Tigers stating that he wanted an immediate release to join Manly-Warringah. Wests Tigers chairman Lee Hagipantelis spoke to Fox Sports about the players transfer request stating "As far as we’re concerned he can mow the lawns at Leichhardt and Campbelltown and paint the sheds at Concord, He’s a contracted employee at the Wests Tigers for 2021 and under the terms of his employment he’ll be remaining at the club".

=== 2021 ===
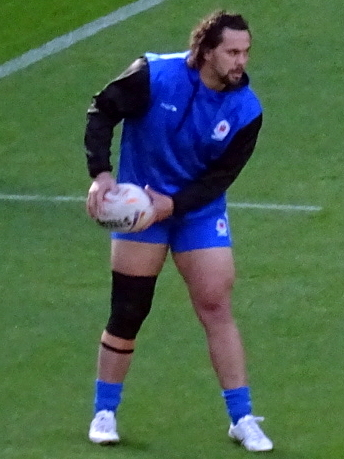
Aloiai warming up for Samoa in 2022

In round 1 of the 2021 NRL season, he made his debut for Manly-Warringah in the club's 46–4 loss against Sydney Roosters.

On 4 May, Aloiai was ruled out for three months with a wrist injury. In round 24, he was sent to the sin bin during Manly's 36–16 victory over wooden spooners Canterbury. Aloiai played 16 games for Manly in the 2021 NRL season including the club's preliminary final loss against South Sydney.

On 28 September during the Dally M awards ceremony, chairman of the Australian Rugby League Commission Peter V'landys misread Aloiai's name during the voting process. V'landys said “Oshay Olay” instead of Josh Aloiai. The gaffe later became a meme across the internet.

Aloiai was set to make his professional boxing debut against Paul Gallen on 10 December but on 24 November it was revealed that Aloiai became the first NRL player to test positive to COVID-19 which meant his match needed to be postponed.

=== 2022 ===
In round 14 of the 2022 NRL season, Aloiai scored two tries against his former club the Wests Tigers in Manly's 30–4 victory. Aloiai was one of seven players involved in the Manly pride jersey player boycott.

Aloiai played a total of 15 games in 2022 scoring four tries as Manly finished 11th on the table and missed the finals.

In October Aloiai was named in the Samoa squad for the 2021 Rugby League World Cup.

=== 2023 ===
Aloiai played 16 games for Manly in the 2023 NRL season as the club finished 12th on the table and missed the finals.

=== 2024 ===
In round 14 of the 2024 NRL season, Aloiai was placed on report for a blatant trip during Manly's 32–22 loss against Penrith. He was later suspended for two matches over the incident. Aloiai played 22 games for Manly in the 2024 NRL season as they finished 7th on the table and qualified for the finals. Manly would be eliminated in the second week of the finals by the Sydney Roosters.

=== 2025 ===
Aloiai was limited to only five appearances for Manly during the 2025 NRL season. During Manly's final match of the season, Aloiai was one of nine players that was farewelled. Aloiai was medically retired from the NRL due to a significant shoulder injury he was not able to recover from.

== Statistics ==
Year	Team	Games	Tries	Pts
2016	Wests Tigers	24	2	8
2017	Wests Tigers	15	2	8
2018	Wests Tigers	16	1	4
2019	Wests Tigers	17	2	8
2020	Wests Tigers	18	4	16
2021	Manly Warringah Sea Eagles	16		
2022	Manly Warringah Sea Eagles	15	4	16
2023	Manly Warringah Sea Eagles	16	1	4
2024	Manly Warringah Sea Eagles	22		
2025	Manly Warringah Sea Eagles	5		
	Totals	164	16	64

== Personal life ==
Aloiai is a devout Christian. "I think the sport they play in heaven is rugby league. I reckon God loves it. A big part of what I'm trying to do now is incorporate my faith into my footy, a lot of people don't understand how that works but it works awesome for me. God has given me a gift so I'm trying to use it is through rugby league and glorify His name," he has said.
