= Christian Tuipulotu =

Tonga international rugby league footballer

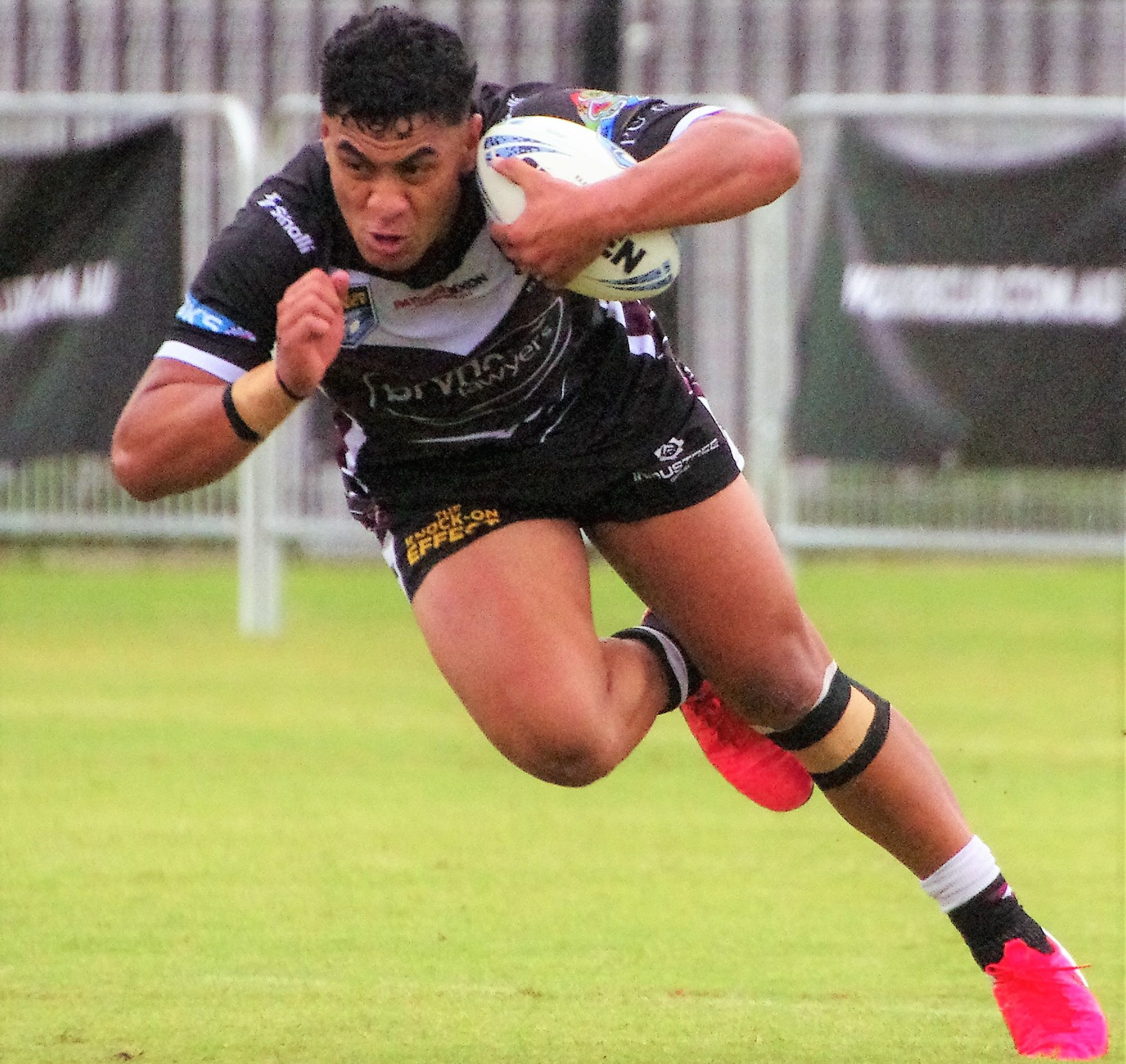

Personal information
- Born: 18 February 2001 (age 25) Auckland, New Zealand
- Height: 186 cm (6 ft 1 in)
- Weight: 106 kg (16 st 10 lb)

Playing information
- Position: Wing
Club
Years	Team	Pld	T	G	FG	P
2020	Sydney Roosters	1	1	0	0	4
2021–23	Manly Sea Eagles	32	13	0	0	52
2024–26	St. George Illawarra	30	19	0	0	76
2027–	St Helens	0	0	0	0	0
	Total	63	33	0	0	132
Representative
Years	Team	Pld	T	G	FG	P
2022	Tonga	1	0	0	0	0
- Source: As of 6 November 2026

Christian Tuipulotu (born 18 February 2001) is a Tonga international rugby league footballer who plays as a winger for the St Helens RFC in the Super League.

He previously played for the Sydney Roosters and Manly Warringah Sea Eagles in the NRL.

== Background ==
Tuipulotu was born in Auckland, New Zealand, and is of Tongan descent. He is also an alumnus of St Paul's College, Auckland.

== Career ==
=== 2020 ===
Tuipulotu made his first grade debut in round 14 of the 2020 NRL season for the Sydney Roosters against Melbourne at the Sydney Cricket Ground, scoring a try on debut.

On 27 October, he signed with Manly-Warringah.

=== 2021 ===
He made only one first grade appearance for Manly in the 2021 NRL season and did not feature in the clubs finals campaign. In round 15 of the 2022 NRL season, he scored two tries in Manly's 28–26 loss against North Queensland.

=== 2022 ===
Tuipulotu was one of seven players involved in the Manly pride jersey player boycott. He played a total of 19 games in the 2022 NRL season scoring 11 tries. Manly would finish 11th on the table and miss out on the finals.

=== 2023 ===
Tuipulotu played 12 matches for Manly in the 2023 NRL season as the club finished 12th on the table and missed the finals.

=== 2024 ===
On 7 February, it was reported that Tuipulotu had been granted an immediate release from Manly to join St. George Illawarra on a two-year deal. In round 19 of the 2024 NRL season, he scored a hat-trick in St. George Illawarra's 30–26 victory over Brisbane. He played a total of 12 games for St. George Illawarra in the 2024 NRL season and scored eight tries as the club finished 11th on the table.

=== 2025 ===
In round 1 of the 2025 NRL season, Tuipulotu scored a hat-trick in St. George Illawarra's 28–20 loss against Canterbury. On 10 April, St. George Illawarra announced that he had signed a one-year extension. In round 6, he scored two tries in St. George Illawarra's 38–16 victory over the Gold Coast. In March, it was reported that head coach Shane Flanagan had banned Tuipulotu from doing his "show me the money" try celebration. Tuipulotu made eight appearances for St. George Illawarra in the 2025 NRL season as the club finished 15th on the table.

=== 2026 ===
Tuipulotu was limited to only eight matches for St. George Illawarra in the 2026 NRL season as the club finished with the Wooden Spoon.

On 10 September 2026 it was reported that he had signed for St Helens in the Super League on a three-year deal.

== Statistics ==
Year	Team	Games	Tries	Pts
2020	Sydney Roosters	1	1	4
2021	Manly Warringah Sea Eagles	1	0	0
2022	Manly Warringah Sea Eagles	19	11	44
2023	Manly Warringah Sea Eagles	12	2	8
	Totals	32	13	52
2024	St. George Illawarra Dragons	12	8	32
2025	St. George Illawarra Dragons	8	8	32
2026	St. George Illawarra Dragons	10	3	12
	Totals	30	19	76
2027	St Helens			
	Totals	63	33	132
