= Lachlan Croker =

Australian professional rugby league footballer

Lachie Croker
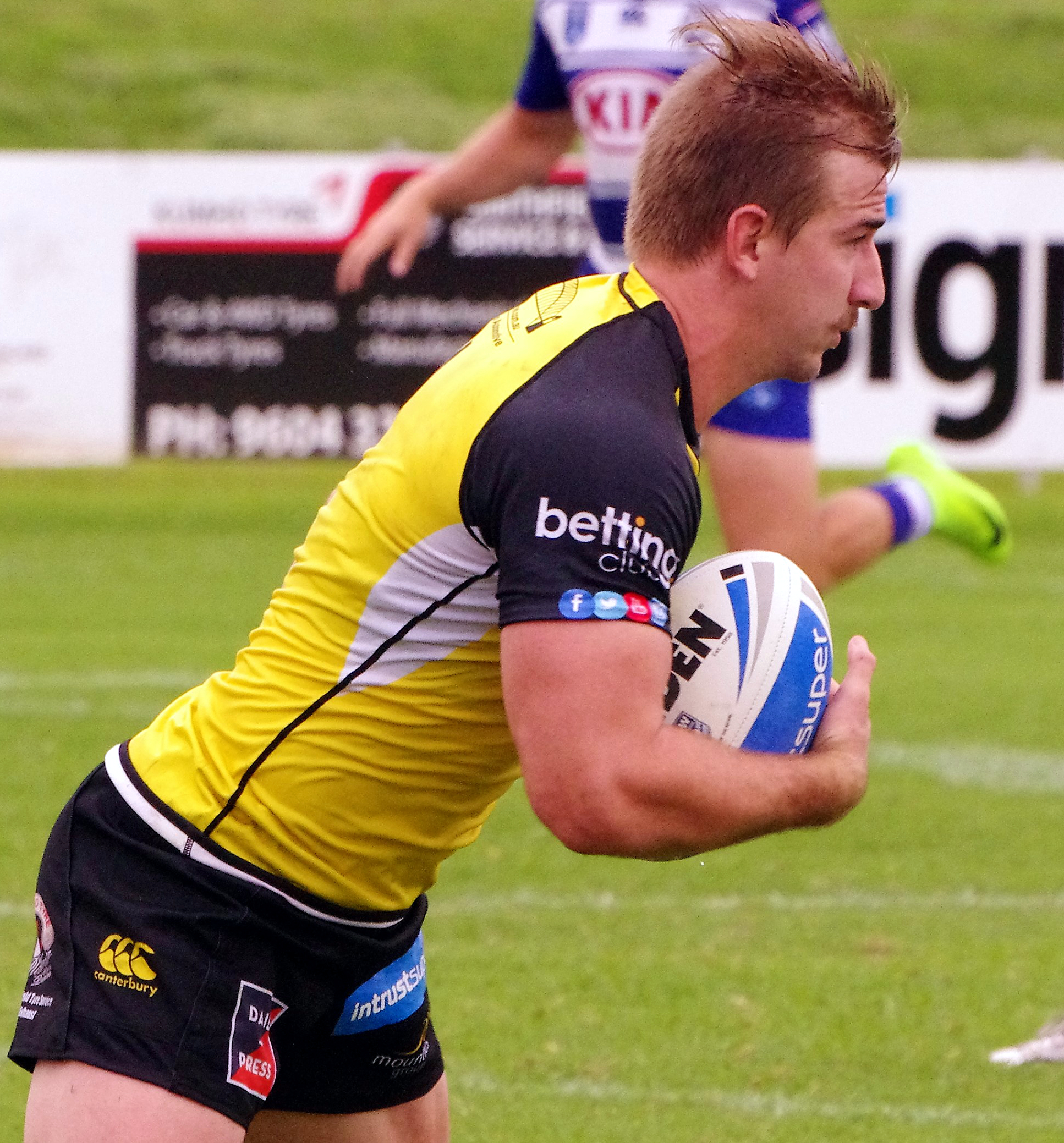

Personal information
- Full name: Lachlan Croker
- Born: 12 December 1996 (age 29) Goulburn, New South Wales, Australia
- Height: 180 cm (5 ft 11 in)
- Weight: 92 kg (14 st 7 lb)

Playing information
- Position: Hooker, Five-eighth
Club
Years	Team	Pld	T	G	FG	P
2016	Canberra Raiders	1	0	0	0	0
2018–25	Manly Sea Eagles	125	20	0	0	80
	Total	126	20	0	0	80
- Source: As of 13 June 2025
- Relatives: Jason Croker (uncle)

Lachlan Croker (born 12 December 1996) is a former Australian professional rugby league footballer who last played as a hooker for the Manly Warringah Sea Eagles in the National Rugby League (NRL).

Croker previously played for the Canberra Raiders as a five-eighth in the NRL.

== Background ==
Croker was born in Goulburn, New South Wales, Australia.

Croker played his junior rugby league for the Crookwell Green Devils and Goulburn Stockmen, before being signed by the Canberra Raiders.

Before deciding on Rugby League, he played for his high school's Rugby Union team, at Trinity Catholic College Goulburn, and was captain of the team for several years.

Croker is the nephew of former Canberra player and Australian international Jason Croker.

== Playing career ==
=== Early career ===
From 2014 to 2016, Croker played for the Canberra Raiders' NYC team. On 11 November 2015, he re-signed with Canberra on a two-year contract until the end of 2017.

=== 2016 ===
In February, Croker got the chance to play with his uncle Jason at the 2016 NRL Auckland Nines. For the 2016 season, he captained the Raiders' NYC side. In round 2 of the 2016 NRL season, he made his NRL debut for Canberra against the Sydney Roosters. That would be his only NRL appearance for the season.

=== 2017 ===
Croker was unable to break back into Canberra's NRL side in 2017. In November, he signed a one-year contract with the Manly-Warringah Sea Eagles, starting in 2018.

=== 2018 ===
In round 1 of the 2018 NRL season, he made his debut for Manly-Warringah, playing at five-eighth 19–18 loss to the Newcastle Knights at Hunter Stadium. In round 2 against the Parramatta Eels, he scored his first NRL try 54-0 wins at Brookvale Oval. In round 8 against the Newcastle Knights, he suffered anterior cruciate ligament (ACL) knee injury.

=== 2019 ===
Croker made his long-awaited return to the Manly side for their round 7 match against the Canberra Raiders. Croker scored 2 tries in the game as Manly won 24–20. The following week, Croker suffered a hamstring injury in the club's win over Canterbury and was ruled out for 4-5 weeks.

=== 2020 ===
Croker played 20 games for Manly-Warringah in the 2020 NRL season as they finished a disappointing 13th on the table.

=== 2021 ===
Croker played 26 games for Manly in the 2021 NRL season including the club's preliminary final loss against South Sydney after he made a full time move from the halves to hooker.

=== 2022 ===
In round 15 of the 2022 NRL season, Croker scored two tries for Manly and kicked a 40/20 in the clubs loss against North Queensland. Manly had led the match 26–12 with seven minutes remaining but were defeated 28–26. Croker played 23 games for Manly throughout the year as the club finished 11th and missed out on the finals.

=== 2023 ===
Croker played 23 games for Manly in the 2023 NRL season as the club finished 12th on the table and missed the finals.

=== 2024 ===
Croker played 16 games for Manly in the 2024 NRL season as they finished 7th on the table and qualified for the finals. Manly would be eliminated in the second week of the finals by the Sydney Roosters.

=== 2025 ===
Croker was limited to just four games with Manly in the 2025 NRL season as the club finished 10th on the table. On 1 December 2025, Croker announced his medical retirement from the NRL due to concussions. The Sea Eagles confirmed that Croker would stay on as the coach for the teams SG Ball squad.

== Statistics ==
Year	Club	Games	Tries	Pts
2016	Canberra Raiders	1		
2018	Manly Warringah Sea Eagles	8	1	4
2019	Manly Warringah Sea Eagles	4	2	8
2020	Manly Warringah Sea Eagles	20	1	4
2021	Manly Warringah Sea Eagles	26	4	16
2022	Manly Warringah Sea Eagles	23	4	16
2023	Manly Warringah Sea Eagles	23	6	24
2024	Manly Warringah Sea Eagles	16	2	8
2025	Manly Warringah Sea Eagles	4		
	Totals	125	20	76
