= Toafofoa Sipley =

Niue international rugby league footballer

Toff Sipley
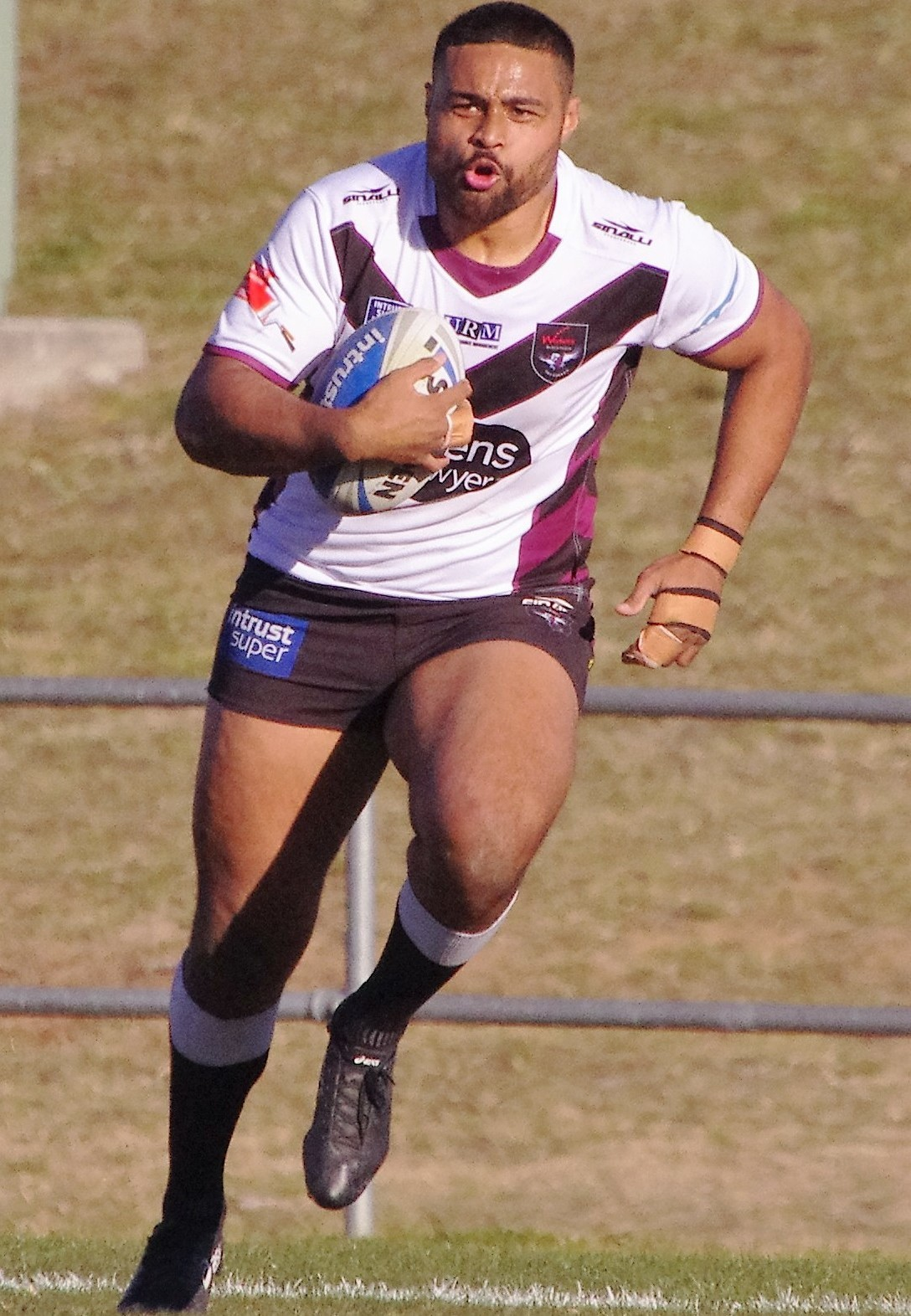

Personal information
- Full name: Toafofoa Sipley
- Born: 5 January 1995 (age 31) Auckland, New Zealand
- Height: 6 ft 3 in (1.90 m)
- Weight: 18 st 13 lb (120 kg)

Playing information
- Position: Prop
Club
Years	Team	Pld	T	G	FG	P
2016–17	New Zealand Warriors	2	0	0	0	0
2018–25	Manly Sea Eagles	97	8	0	0	32
2026–	Warrington Wolves	19	4	0	0	16
	Total	118	12	0	0	48
Representative
Years	Team	Pld	T	G	FG	P
2017	NSW Residents	1	0	0	0	0
2018	Niue	1	1	0	0	4
- Source: As of 30 August 2025

Toafofoa Sipley (born 5 January 1995) is a Niue international rugby league footballer who plays as a prop for the Warrington Wolves in the Super League.

He previously played for the New Zealand Warriors in the NRL.

== Background ==
Sipley was born in Auckland, New Zealand and is of Samoan and Niuean descent.

He played his junior rugby league for the Richmond Rovers, before being signed by the New Zealand Warriors.

== Playing career ==
=== Early career ===
From 2013 to 2015, Sipley played for the New Zealand Warriors' NYC team. On 5 October 2014, he played in the Warriors' 2014 NYC Grand Final win over the Brisbane Broncos. He captained the side in 2015. On 2 May 2015, he played for the Junior Kiwis against the Junior Kangaroos. On 3 June 2015, he re-signed with the Warriors on a 2-year contract.

=== 2016 ===
Sipley graduated to the Warriors' Intrust Super Premiership NSW team in 2016. In Round 9 of the season, he made his NRL debut for the Warriors against the St. George Illawarra Dragons.

=== 2017 ===
In June, Sipley signed a two-year contract with the Manly Warringah Sea Eagles for the 2018/2019 seasons.

=== 2018 ===
On 19 May, Toafofoa Sipley made his club debut for Manly Warringah against the Melbourne Storm in the 24-4 win at AAMI Park. Sipley made a total of 4 appearances for Manly in the 2018 NRL season as the club endured one of their worst ever seasons finishing 15th on the table and narrowly avoiding the wooden spoon.

On 27 October, Sipley made his debut for Niue against Italy. In this match, he scored a try as Niue lost 36–32.

=== 2019 ===
Sipley made 10 appearances for Manly Warringah in the 2019 NRL season as the club reached the finals. Sipley played in Manly's elimination final victory over Cronulla-Sutherland at Brookvale Oval.

=== 2020 & 2021 ===
Sipley made no appearances for Manly in the 2020 NRL season. In round 16 of the 2021 NRL season, he scored two tries for Manly in a 66-0 victory over Canterbury. Sipley played 20 games for Manly in the 2021 NRL season but did not feature in their finals campaign which saw them reach the preliminary final stage before losing to South Sydney.

=== 2022 ===
Sipley made 19 appearances for Manly in the 2022 NRL season as the club finished 11th on the table. He was one of seven players involved in the Manly pride jersey player boycott.

=== 2023 ===
Sipley played 15 matches for Manly in the 2023 NRL season as the club finished 12th on the table and missed the finals.

=== 2024 ===
Sipley was limited to only 13 games for Manly in the 2024 NRL season as they finished 7th on the table and qualified for the finals. Manly would be eliminated in the second week of the finals by the Sydney Roosters.

=== 2025 ===
On 4 August, Manly announced that Sipley would depart the club at the end of the season after he was released from his contract. On the same day, it was announced that Sipley had signed a two-year deal with English club Warrington. On 2 September, Sipley was found guilty by the NRL judiciary after being placed on report for a cannonball tackle during Manly's victory over St. George Illawarra. He was suspended for four matches.

=== 2026 ===
On 13 February, Sipley made his Super League debut for the Warrington Wolves in the opening round 24-14 victory against St. Helens. On 28 February, Sipley scored his first Super League try in a 27-16 victory over Wakefield Trinity at home, he also received a yellow card for a professional foul at the end of the first half to prevent a try, he was awarded the player of the match award by the stadium PA before the BBC pundits decided it would go to Marc Sneyd instead.

== Statistics ==
Year	Team	Games	Tries	Pts
2016	New Zealand Warriors	2		
2018	Manly Warringah Sea Eagles	4		
2019	Manly Warringah Sea Eagles	10		
2021	Manly Warringah Sea Eagles	20	2	8
2022	Manly Warringah Sea Eagles	19	1	4
2023	Manly Warringah Sea Eagles	15	2	8
2024	Manly Warringah Sea Eagles	13	1	4
2025	Manly Warringah Sea Eagles	12	2	8
2026	Warrington Wolves	19	4	16
	Totals	118	12	48
