= Haumole Olakau'atu =

Tonga international rugby league footballer

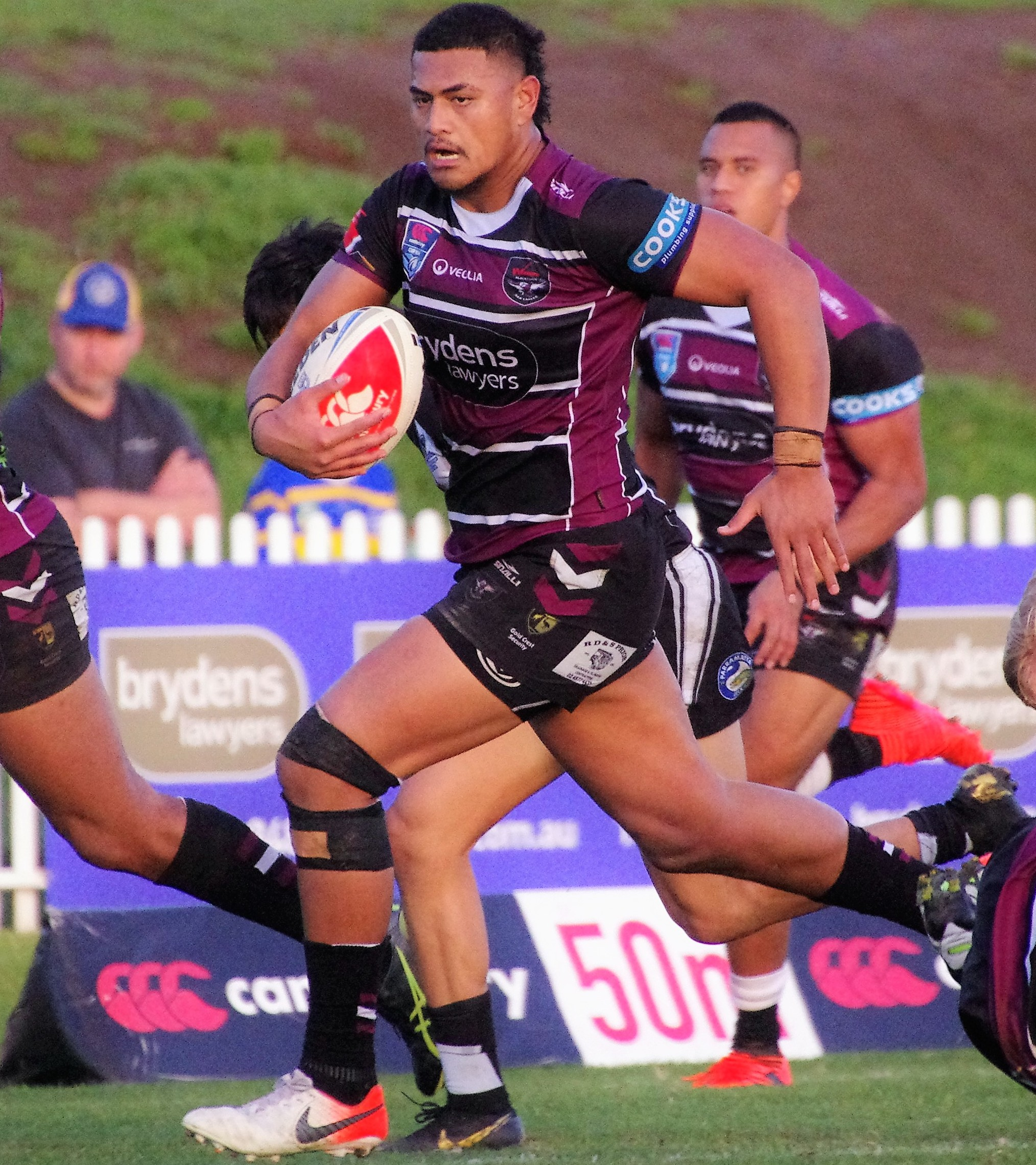

Personal information
- Born: 1 October 1998 (age 28) Guildford, New South Wales, Australia
- Height: 196 cm (6 ft 5 in)
- Weight: 113 kg (17 st 11 lb)

Playing information
- Position: Second-row
Club
Years	Team	Pld	T	G	FG	P
2019–	Manly Sea Eagles	130	50	0	0	196
Representative
Years	Team	Pld	T	G	FG	P
2022–	Tonga	12	3	0	0	12
2024–26	New South Wales	3	0	0	0	0
- Source: As of 15 November 2026

Haumole Olakau'atu (born 1 October 1998) is a Tonga international rugby league footballer who plays as a second-row forward for the Manly-Warringah Sea Eagles in the National Rugby League (NRL).

== Background ==
Olakau'atu was born in Guildford, New South Wales, Australia, and is of Tongan descent.

Olakau'atu played junior rugby league with Berala Bears and Wentworthville Magpies after having grown up playing union. He later tried out for the Parramatta SG Ball and Harold Matthews sides but was unsuccessful. Olakau'atu then was signed by Manly and played for the club in their 2017 Holden Cup premiership winning side against Parramatta.

== Playing career ==
=== 2019 ===
Olakau'atu made his NRL debut for Manly against the Cronulla-Sutherland Sharks in week 1 of the finals of the 2019 NRL season. Olakau'atu was kept in the Manly team for the following week against South Sydney in which Manly lost 34–26 in the elimination semi-final at ANZ Stadium.

=== 2020 ===
He made five appearances for Manly in the 2020 NRL season as the club missed out on the finals finishing 13th on the table.

=== 2021 ===
In round 14 of the 2021 NRL season, he scored two tries for Manly in a 50–18 victory over North Queensland. He played 21 games for Manly in the 2021 NRL season including the club's preliminary final loss against South Sydney.

=== 2022 ===
Following Queensland's victory in game one of the 2022 State of Origin series, Olakau'atu posted on Instagram with the caption "Been a Maroons since day dot". This caused controversy as he was eligible for selection by New South Wales. Olakau'atu was one of seven players involved in the Manly pride jersey player boycott. He made a total of 21 appearances for Manly in the 2022 NRL season scoring ten tries. Manly would finish the season in 11th place and missed out on the finals.

=== 2023 ===
In round 3 of the 2023 NRL season, he scored two tries including the winner in Manly's 34–30 victory over Parramatta. In round 5, he scored a try and was later sent to the sin bin during Manly's 32–32 draw with Newcastle. He played a total of 24 matches for Manly in the 2023 NRL season and scored ten tries as the club finished 12th on the table and missed the finals. Olakau'atu re-signed with Manly until the end of 2031.

=== 2024 ===
On 26 May, Olakau'atu was selected by New South Wales ahead of the 2024 State of Origin series. Olakau'atu was involved in a melee during the third State of Origin match, he was suspended for two matches after going into the melee to protect Brian To'o. Olakau'atu was also sent off as he was sitting on the bench and banned from participating in the celebrations in the sheds after the match.

Olakau'atu played 21 matches for Manly in the 2024 NRL season as they finished 7th on the table and qualified for the finals. Manly would be eliminated in the second week of the finals by the Sydney Roosters.

=== 2025 ===
In round 13 of the 2025 NRL season, Olakau'atu scored two tries for Manly in their 34–6 win over Brisbane. On 28 July, it was announced that he would miss the rest of the 2025 NRL season after suffering a dislocated shoulder for the second time in the season this time in Manly's heavy loss against Canterbury in round 21.

=== 2026 ===
In May, he was selected by New South Wales for game one in the 2026 State of Origin series. Ahead of game two, Olakau'atu was controversially omitted from the team by head coach Laurie Daley. He played 21 matches for Manly in the 2026 NRL season as the club finished 9th on the table.

In October 2026, Olakau'atu was selected to represent Tonga for the 2026 Rugby League World Cup.

== Statistics ==
Year	Team	Games	Tries	Pts
2019	Manly Warringah Sea Eagles	2		
2020	Manly Warringah Sea Eagles	5	1	4
2021	Manly Warringah Sea Eagles	21	8	32
2022	Manly Warringah Sea Eagles	21	10	40
2023	Manly Warringah Sea Eagles	24	10	40
2024	Manly Warringah Sea Eagles	21	7	28
2025	Manly Warringah Sea Eagles	8	2	8
2026	Manly Warringah Sea Eagles	21	9	36
2027	Manly Warringah Sea Eagles			
	Totals	130	50	200
