= Josh Schuster =

Samoa international rugby league footballer

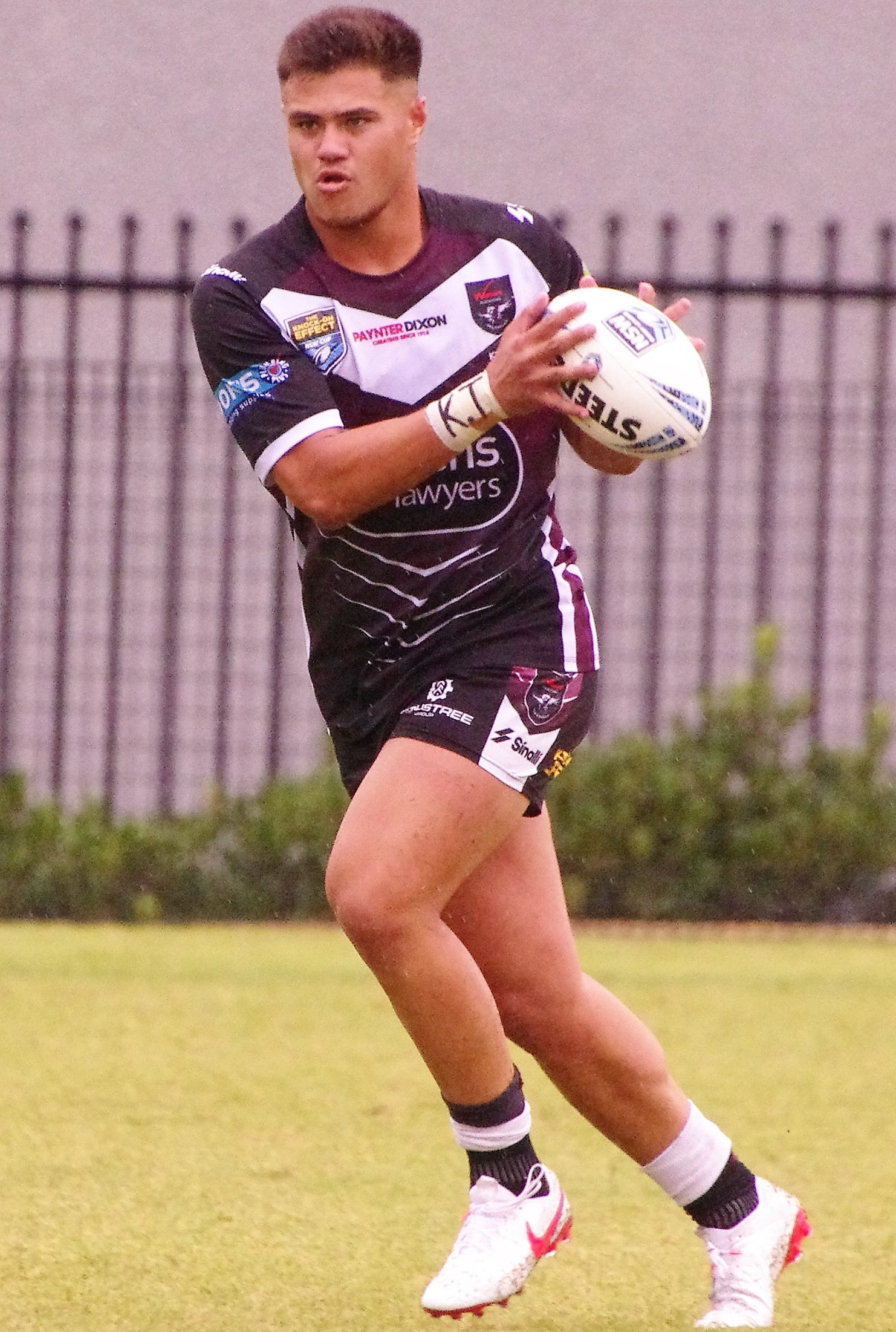

Personal information
- Full name: Joshua Schuster
- Born: 5 May 2001 (age 25) Sydney, New South Wales, Australia
- Height: 185 cm (6 ft 1 in)
- Weight: 102 kg (16 st 1 lb)

Playing information
- Position: Five-eighth, Lock, Second-row
Club
Years	Team	Pld	T	G	FG	P
2020–24	Manly Sea Eagles	50	5	0	0	20
Representative
Years	Team	Pld	T	G	FG	P
2022	Samoa	1	0	0	0	0
- Source: As of 18 August 2023
- Relatives: John Schuster (great uncle); Peter Schuster (great uncle)

Josh Schuster (born 5 May 2001) is a Samoa international rugby league footballer who last played as a second-row forward or five-eighth for the South Sydney Rabbitohs in the NRL.

== Background ==
Schuster was born in Sydney, Australia to Australian parents of Samoan and German descent. Schuster's grandfather David and great-uncle Peter both represented Samoa in rugby union, while another great-uncle, John, represented New Zealand in rugby union and Samoa in rugby league. His uncle Peter represented Australia in rugby sevens.

He played junior rugby league for the Mount Pritchard Mounties.

== Career ==
=== 2020 ===
Schuster made his NRL debut in round 17 of the 2020 NRL season for Manly-Warringah against the Wests Tigers; in a 34–32 loss at Brookvale Oval in an NRL game.

=== 2021 ===
In round 5 of the 2021 NRL season, Schuster scored his first try in the NRL in Manly-Warringah's 13–12 win over the New Zealand Warriors. Schuster played 21 games for Manly in the 2021 NRL season including the club's preliminary final loss against South Sydney.

=== 2022 ===
On 9 February, it was announced that Schuster would be ruled out indefinitely from playing after sustaining an ankle injury at pre-season training. He made 13 appearances for Manly in the 2022 NRL season as the club finished 11th on the table and miss out on the finals. Schuster was one of seven players involved in the Manly pride jersey player boycott.

=== 2023 ===
On 4 July, Schuster signed a three-year contract extension to remain at Manly until the end of the 2027 season.

Schuster was demoted to reserve grade for the second time in the 2023 NRL season after a lacklustre performance against the New Zealand Warriors in round 25. Schuster played 15 matches for Manly in the 2023 NRL season as the club finished 12th on the table and missed the finals.

=== 2024 ===
On 10 April, it was announced that Schuster had been told by Manly officials he was free to negotiate with other clubs despite the player being contracted to Manly until the end of 2027. On 24 April just 14 days after being told he was free to negotiate the Manly club mutually agreed and released Schuster from the remainder of his contract. On 18 September, Schuster had signed a one-year deal to join the South Sydney Rabbitohs.

=== 2025 ===
On 21 June, Schuster announced he would be taking an indefinite break from rugby league due to mental health reasons. Schuster was one of nine players that was released by the South Sydney club at the end of their season.
