= 2024 Sydney Roosters season =

Australian rugby league club season

- NRL Rank: 3rd
- Play-off result: PF
- 2024 record: Wins: 16; losses: 8
- Points scored: For: 738; against: 463

Team information
- CEO: Joe Kelly
- Coach: (Australia) Trent Robinson
- Captain: (Australia) James Tedesco
- Stadium: Allianz Stadium (Capacity: 42,500)
← 2023	List of seasons	2025 →

The 2024 Sydney Roosters season is the 117th season in the club's history and they compete in the National Rugby League.

The captain James Tedesco retains his captaincy for his 4th consecutive season, while Head Coach Trent Robinson maintains his position for the 12th consecutive season.

== Squad ==
Sydney Roosters 2024 squad
Top 30 squad - 2024 NRL season			Supplementary list	Coaching staff
Egan Butcher – SR, PR; Nat Butcher – SR; Lindsay Collins – PR; Angus Crichton – SR; Zach Dockar-Clay – LK, FE; Michael Jennings – CE; Luke Keary – FE, HB; Spencer Leniu – PR; Joseph Manu – CE, FB; Terrell May – PR	Tyler Moriarty – HK; Mark Nawaqanitawase – WG; Junior Pauga – WG, CE; Victor Radley – LK, SR; Billy Smith – CE; Brandon Smith – HK; Sandon Smith – FE, HB; Blake Steep – SR, LK; Joseph-Aukuso Suaalii – CE, WG; James Tedesco (c) – FB	Robert Toia – CE; Daniel Tupou – WG; Sitili Tupouniua – SR, CE; Jared Waerea-Hargreaves (vc) – PR; Sam Walker – HB; Connor Watson – HK, LK, FE; Siua Wong – SR, PR, LK; Naufahu Whyte – LK, PR; Dominic Young – WG	Lewis Murphy – WG; Ethan Roberts – SR; Xavier Va'a – PR; Alex Young – WG; Extended squad: Jake Elliott – HB, FE; Salesi Foketi – SR, LK; Benaiah Ioelu – HK; Ethan King – CE, FB; Max McCathie – SR; Dylan Napa – PR; Hugo Savala – HB, FE; De La Salle Va'a – PR	Head coach: Trent Robinson; Assistant coaches: Matt King; Justin Holbrook; Boyd Cordner; Jake Friend; Cooper Cronk (Specialist Halves Coach); Brett Morris (NSW Cup Coach); David Swann (Jersey Flegg Coach); Legend: (c) Captain(s); (vc) Vice-captain(s); Updated: 27 September 2024; Source(s): Roosters team profiles

== Pre-season ==
The Roosters played the Manly Warringah Sea Eagles in Gosford and the South Sydney Rabbitohs in Belmore as their pre-season fixtures. Both matches were part of the second edition of the NRL Pre-season Challenge.

Win Draw Loss

Round 1: 17 February 2024	Sydney Roosters	36–22	Manly Warringah Sea Eagles	Gosford
18:00 AEDT	Tries: Walker 17'; Young 22'; Tupou 41', 59'; Tupouniua 45'; Watson 73'; Pauga 78'; Goals: Walker 4/7 19', 46', 75', 78'	[Report Report]	Tries: Sipley 9'; Faulalo 31'; Arthur 56'; Paulo 70'; Goals: Wakeham 3/4 11', 32', 57'	Stadium: Industree Group Stadium; Attendance: 8,663; Referee: Grant Atkins

Round 2: 23 February 2024	South Sydney Rabbitohs	10–46	Sydney Roosters	Belmore
18:00 AEDT	Tries: French 11'; Te Hau 65'; Goals: Bentley-Hape 1/2 13'	[Report; Details Report]	Tries: Nasau 3'; Williams 16'; Ross 27'; Foketi 36'; Fekitoa 47'; Gromek 59', 61'; Coleman 72'; Jolliffe 74'; Goals: Taipari 5/7 28', 38', 49', 60', 73'; Thomas 0/1; Moriarty 0/1	Stadium: Belmore Sports Ground; Attendance: 6,091; Referee: Ashley Klein

== Regular season ==
=== League table ===
Pos	Team	Pld	W	D	L	B	PF	PA	PD	Pts	Qualification
1	Melbourne Storm	24	19	0	5	3	692	449	+243	44	Advance to finals series
2	Penrith Panthers (P)	24	17	0	7	3	580	394	+186	40	Advance to finals series
3	Sydney Roosters	24	16	0	8	3	738	463	+275	38	Advance to finals series
4	Cronulla-Sutherland Sharks	24	16	0	8	3	653	431	+222	38	Advance to finals series
5	North Queensland Cowboys	24	15	0	9	3	657	568	+89	36	Advance to finals series
6	Canterbury-Bankstown Bulldogs	24	14	0	10	3	529	433	+96	34	Advance to finals series
7	Manly Warringah Sea Eagles	24	13	1	10	3	634	521	+113	33	Advance to finals series
8	Newcastle Knights	24	12	0	12	3	470	510	−40	30	Advance to finals series
9	Canberra Raiders	24	12	0	12	3	474	601	−127	30	
10	Dolphins	24	11	0	13	3	577	578	−1	28	
11	St. George Illawarra Dragons	24	11	0	13	3	508	634	−126	28	
12	Brisbane Broncos	24	10	0	14	3	537	607	−70	26	
13	New Zealand Warriors	24	9	1	14	3	512	574	−62	25	
14	Gold Coast Titans	24	8	0	16	3	488	656	−168	22	
15	Parramatta Eels	24	7	0	17	3	561	716	−155	20	
16	South Sydney Rabbitohs	24	7	0	17	3	494	682	−188	20	
17	Wests Tigers	24	6	0	18	3	463	750	−287	18	

Source: National Rugby League
(P) Premiers

=== Results by round ===
Round	1	2	3	4	5	6	7	8	9	10	11	12	13	14	15	16	17	18	19	20	21	22	23	24	25	26	27
Ground	H	A	H	H	A	A	H	A	A	H	N	A	H	–	A	H	H	H	–	A	H	A	–	H	A	H	A
Result	W	L	W	L	L	W	L	W	W	W	L	W	L	B	W	W	W	W	B	L	W	W	B	W	W	L	W
Position	6	8	2	7	10	9	11	7	6	5	7	5	8	6	5	4	4	3	3	4	3	3	3	3	2	3	3
Points	2	2	4	4	4	6	6	8	10	12	12	14	14	16	18	20	22	24	26	26	28	30	32	34	36	36	38

Source: National Rugby League
A = Away; H = Home; N = Neutral; B = Bye; W = Win; D = Draw; L = Loss

=== Matches ===
The league fixtures were announced on 13 November 2023.

Win Draw Loss Fixtures

Round 1: 2 March 2024	Sydney Roosters	20–10	Brisbane Broncos	Las Vegas, United States
20:30 PST	Tries: Manu 4'; Pauga 51'; Radley 71'; Goals: Walker 4/4 5', 15 pen', 53', 73'	[Report Report]	Tries: Mariner 35'; Walsh 59'; Goals: Reynolds 1/2 60'	Stadium: Allegiant Stadium; Attendance: 40,746; Referee: Adam Gee

Round 2: 17 March 2024	Manly Warringah Sea Eagles	21–14	Sydney Roosters	Brookvale
16:05 AEDT	Tries: Croker 6'; Koula 20'; Talau 41'; Goals: Garrick 4/4 7', 39 pen', 43', 62 pen' Field goals: Cherry-Evans 71'	[Report Report]	Tries: Tupou 9'; Tedesco 23'; Young 55'; Goals: Walker 1/2 25'; Sua'ali'i 0/1	Stadium: 4 Pines Park; Attendance: 17,284; Referee: Todd Smith

Round 3: 22 March 2024	Sydney Roosters	48–6	South Sydney Rabbitohs	Moore Park
20:00 AEDT	Tries: Young 3'; Walker 14', 27'; Manu 41', 66'; Watson 61'; Tedesco 72', 77'; Goals: Walker 4/4 5', 16', 29', 43'; Sua'ali'i 4/4 62', 67', 74', 77'	[Report Report]	Tries: Host 50'; Goals: Mitchell 1/1 51'; Sin bin: Mitchell (yellow card) 65' to 75'	Stadium: Allianz Stadium; Attendance: 37,594; Referee: Ashley Klein

Round 4: 28 March 2024	Sydney Roosters	16–22	Penrith Panthers	Moore Park
20:00 AEDT	Tries: Tupouniua 39'; Br. Smith 74'; Tupou 79'; Goals: Walker 2/3 39', 75'	[Report Report]	Tries: Turuva 10', 46', 51'; Edwards 14'; Goals: Edwards 3/5 11', 16', 32 pen'	Stadium: Allianz Stadium; Attendance: 25,898; Referee: Adam Gee

Round 5: 5 April 2024	Canterbury-Bankstown Bulldogs	30–26	Sydney Roosters	Sydney Olympic Park
18:00 AEST	Tries: Taaffe 0'; Burton 8', 14', 64'; Hughes 39'; Goals: Burton 5/6 2', 9', 15', 27 pen', 39'	[Report Report]	Tries: E. Butcher 46', 54'; Whyte 50'; Manu 57'; Tupou 74'; Goals: Sua'ali'i 2/2 47', 75'; Keary 1/3 51'; Sin bin: Radley (yellow card) 72' to 80'; Sent off: Young (red card) 26'	Stadium: Accor Stadium; Attendance: 7,169; Referee: Grant Atkins

Round 6: 11 April 2024	Newcastle Knights	20–22	Sydney Roosters	Newcastle
19:50 AEST	Tries: Hastings 5'; Best 37'; Elliott 76'; Goals: Ponga 4/4 6', 13 pen', 38', 76'	[Report Report]	Tries: Tupou 16', 64'; Radley 22'; Br. Smith 31'; Goals: Sua'ali'i 3/4 24', 33', 65'	Stadium: McDonald Jones Stadium; Attendance: 21,940; Referee: Gerard Sutton

Round 7: 18 April 2024	Sydney Roosters	12–18	Melbourne Storm	Moore Park
19:50 AEDT	Tries: Jennings 17'; Manu 67'; Goals: Sua'ali'i 2/2 18', 68'	[Report Report]	Tries: Hughes 12'; Katoa 30'; Coates 73'; Goals: Meaney 3/3 14', 32', 75'; Sin bin: Munster (yellow card) 54' to 64'	Stadium: Allianz Stadium; Attendance: 17,714; Referee: Ashley Klein

Round 8: 25 April 2024	St. George Illawarra Dragons	18–60	Sydney Roosters	Moore Park
16:00 AEST	Tries: Su'a 5'; De Belin 50'; Eisenhuth 67'; Goals: Lomax 3/3 6', 51', 68'	[Report Report]	Tries: Young 10'; Crichton 16'; Manu 26', 59'; Walker 32'; N. Butcher 36', 71'; Keary 55'; Tedesco 62'; Sua'ali'i 76'; Goals: Walker 10/10 12', 17', 28', 33', 38', 57', 61', 63', 73', 77'	Stadium: Allianz Stadium; Attendance: 40,727; Referee: Adam Gee

Round 9: 3 May 2024	Brisbane Broncos	18–40	Sydney Roosters	Brisbane
20:00 AEST	Tries: Riki 7'; Staggs 46'; Mam 48'; Goals: Reynolds 1/1 9'; Walsh 2/2 47', 50'; Sin bin: Mariner (yellow card) 53' to 63'	[Report Report]	Tries: Manu 11'; Crichton 26', 35'; May 57', 68'; Watson 63'; Young 71'; Goals: Walker 6/7 12', 28', 36', 58', 64', 69'	Stadium: Suncorp Stadium; Attendance: 40,190; Referee: Ashley Klein

Round 10: 12 May 2024	Sydney Roosters	38–18	New Zealand Warriors	Moore Park
14:00 AEST	Tries: Young 3', 9'; Crichton 6', 12'; Tupou 44'; Tedesco 52'; Walker 75'; Goals: Walker 5/7 5', 7', 14', 54', 76'	[Report Report]	Tries: Kosi 49'; Nicoll-Klokstad 61'; Fonua-Blake 68'; Goals: Pompey 3/3 50', 62', 69'	Stadium: Allianz Stadium; Attendance: 16,517; Referee: Kasey Badger

Round 11: 18 May 2024	Cronulla-Sutherland Sharks	38–30	Sydney Roosters	Brisbane
17:30 AEST	Tries: Kennedy 0'; Katoa 18'; Wilton 30'; Talakai 43'; Mulitalo 65'; Hazelton 77'; Goals: Hynes 7/7 2', 20', 31', 44', 59 pen', 66', 78'	[Report Report]	Tries: Young 6', 70'; Tupou 25'; Pauga 34', 39'; Goals: Walker 5/6 8', 10 pen', 35', 40', 72'; Sin bin: Sua'ali'i (yellow card) 14' to 24'	Stadium: Suncorp Stadium; Attendance: 48,934; Referee: Adam Gee

Round 12: 25 May 2024	Canberra Raiders	16–44	Sydney Roosters	Canberra
16:05 AEST	Tries: Cotric 15'; Young 48'; Weekes 72'; Goals: Rapana 2/3 16', 73'	[Report Report]	Tries: Radley 3'; Keary 10'; Manu 35', 53'; Tedesco 40', 78'; Sua'ali'i 58'; Crichton 67'; Goals: Walker 3/3 4', 12', 79'; Sua'ali'i 3/5 36', 42', 55'	Stadium: GIO Stadium; Attendance: 18,049; Referee: Todd Smith

Round 13: 2 June 2024	Sydney Roosters	16–18	North Queensland Cowboys	Moore Park
16:05 AEST	Tries: May 24'; Young 38'; Goals: Walker 4/4 20 pen', 26', 39', 50 pen'	[Report Report]	Tries: Burns 32'; Drinkwater 53'; Finefeuiaki 68'; Goals: Drinkwater 3/5 55', 57 pen', 73 pen' Sin bin: Luki (yellow card) 49' to 59'	Stadium: Allianz Stadium; Attendance: 13,811; Referee: Gerard Sutton

Round 14 (Bye for Sydney Roosters)

Round 15: 15 June 2024	Parramatta Eels	18–28	Sydney Roosters	Parramatta
19:35 AEST	Tries: Moses 36'; Brown 41'; Talagi 45'; Goals: Moses 3/4 37', 43', 49 pen' Sin bin: Tuilagi (yellow card) 3' to 13'	[Report Report]	Tries: Pauga 4'; Jennings 9'; Tupou 27', 64'; Crichton 75'; Goals: Walker 4/5 5', 28', 66', 76'; Sin bin: Waerea-Hargreaves (yellow card) 32' to 42'	Stadium: CommBank Stadium; Attendance: 20,072; Referee: Chris Butler

Round 16: 22 June 2024	Sydney Roosters	26–8	Canterbury-Bankstown Bulldogs	Gosford
17:30 AEST	Tries: Young 21'; N. Butcher 33'; May 41'; Steep 65'; Goals: Walker 5/5 5 pen', 23', 34', 43', 66'; Sin bin: Walker (yellow card) 78' to 80'; Sent off: Pauga (red card) 72'	[Report Report]	Tries: Salmon 17'; Skelton 46'; Goals: Burton 0/2	Stadium: Industree Group Stadium; Attendance: 16,868; Referee: Grant Atkins

Round 17: 30 June 2024	Sydney Roosters	40–6	Wests Tigers	Moore Park
18:15 AEST	Tries: Young 14', 16'; May 20'; Keary 31'; Tupou 48', 68'; Tedesco 64'; Radley 66'; Goals: Walker 4/8 15', 21', 50', 65'	[Report Report]	Tries: Pole 79'; Goals: Koroisau 1/1 80'; Sin bin: Koroisau (yellow card) 55' to 65'; Doueihi (yellow card) 63' to 73'	Stadium: Allianz Stadium; Attendance: 14,711; Referee: Ziggy Przeklasa-Adamski

Round 18: 7 July 2024	Sydney Roosters	42–12	St. George Illawarra Dragons	Moore Park
14:00 AEST	Tries: Radley 6'; Young 25'; Collins 51'; Crichton 56'; Tedesco 61'; Tupou 65'; Tupouniua 78'; Goals: Walker 7/8 7', 9 pen', 27', 53', 63', 67', 79'; Sin bin: Waerea-Hargreaves (yellow card) 16' to 26'	[Report Report]	Tries: Liddle 36'; Tuipulotu 47'; Goals: Lomax 2/2 37', 49'	Stadium: Allianz Stadium; Attendance: 23,388; Referee: Ashley Klein

Round 19 (Bye for Sydney Roosters)

Round 20: 20 July 2024	Melbourne Storm	24–8	Sydney Roosters	Melbourne
19:35 AEST	Tries: Howarth 13'; Anderson 16', 36'; Fa'alogo 78'; Goals: Meaney 4/6 17', 55 pen', 63 pen', 79'; Sin bin: Chan (yellow card) 46' to 56'	[Report Report]	Tries: Tupou 26'; Young 66'; Goals: Walker 0/2; Sin bin: Radley (yellow card) 35' to 45'; Watson (yellow card) 54' to 64'	Stadium: AAMI Park; Attendance: 17,055; Referee: Grant Atkins

Round 21: 27 July 2024	Sydney Roosters	34–30	Manly Warringah Sea Eagles	Moore Park
19:35 AEST	Tries: Sua'ali'i 4'; Tedesco 8'; Keary 14'; Young 19'; Radley 32'; Jennings 66'; Goals: Walker 5/6 5', 9', 16', 34', 68'	[Report Report]	Tries: Brooks 22'; Sipley 37'; Talau 46'; Faulalo 73'; Cherry-Evans 75'; Goals: Garrick 1/1 24'; Cherry-Evans 4/4 38', 47', 74', 76'	Stadium: Allianz Stadium; Attendance: 25,155; Referee: Ashley Klein

Round 22: 2 August 2024	Dolphins	34–40	Sydney Roosters	Perth
18:00 AWST	Tries: Plath 13'; Kaufusi 24'; Isaako 27'; Tabuai-Fidow 43'; Bostock 70'; Goals: Isaako 6/6 15', 26', 29', 39 pen', 44', 71'; Katoa 1/1 76 pen'	[Report Report]	Tries: Sua'ali'i 4'; Walker 8', 17'; Tupou 46'; Tupouniua 49', 56'; Goals: Walker 8/8 5', 10', 19', 33 pen', 47', 51', 58', 66 pen' Sin bin: Manu (yellow card) 69' to 79'	Stadium: HBF Park; Attendance: 20,027; Referee: Gerard Sutton

Round 23 (Bye for Sydney Roosters)

Round 24: 16 August 2024	Sydney Roosters	38–14	Parramatta Eels	Moore Park
20:00 AEST	Tries: Leniu 9'; Young 15', 44', 57'; Tupou 20'; Tedesco 26'; Tupouniua 51'; Goals: Walker 5/7 10', 16', 21', 27', 53'; Sin bin: Whyte (yellow card) 64' to 74'	[Report Report]	Tries: Tuilagi 31'; Russell 67'; Lussick 79'; Goals: Gutherson 1/3 79'; Sin bin: Greig (yellow card) 14' to 24'; Hands (yellow card) 43' to 53'	Stadium: Allianz Stadium; Attendance: 20,724; Referee: Grant Atkins

Round 25: 25 August 2024	Gold Coast Titans	22–48	Sydney Roosters	Gold Coast
14:00 AEST	Tries: Khan-Pereira 9', 26', 76'; Kini 49'; Goals: Campbell 3/4 27', 51', 76'	[Report Report]	Tries: Crichton 3', 55', 57'; Young 22'; Tupou 29', 39'; Walker 32'; Tedesco 44'; Tupouniua 66'; Goals: Walker 6/9 4', 31', 34', 45', 56', 68'; Sin bin: Waerea-Hargreaves (yellow card) 11' to 21'	Stadium: Cbus Super Stadium; Attendance: 19,286; Referee: Adam Gee

Round 26: 1 September 2024	Sydney Roosters	12–14	Canberra Raiders	Moore Park
16:05 AEST	Tries: Tupou 63', 79'; Goals: Keary 2/4 12 pen', 78 pen'	[Report Report]	Tries: Whitehead 16'; Sasagi 26'; Savage 54'; Goals: Cook 1/3 28'; Sin bin: Whitehead (yellow card) 37' to 47', 62' to 72'	Stadium: Allianz Stadium; Attendance: 22,866; Referee: Todd Smith

Round 27: 6 September 2024	South Sydney Rabbitohs	28–36	Sydney Roosters	Sydney Olympic Park
20:00 AEST	Tries: Gray 22', 78'; Walker 33'; Munro 70'; Burgess 73'; Goals: Cook 2/3 34', 71'; Burgess 1/1 74'; Hawkins 1/1 78'	[Report Report]	Tries: Nawaqanitawase 6'; Pauga 28', 37', 60'; Tupouniua 45'; Tedesco 48', 55'; Goals: Sua'ali'i 4/7 8', 47', 49', 62'	Stadium: Accor Stadium; Attendance: 19,674; Referee: Grant Atkins

== Finals series ==
=== Bracket ===
Qualifying and elimination finals
14 September – Melbourne
1	Melbourne	37
4	Cronulla-Sutherland	10
14 September – Townsville
5	North Queensland	28
8	Newcastle	16
15 September – Sydney
6	Canterbury-Bankstown	22
7	Manly Warringah	24
13 September – Sydney
2	Penrith	30
3	Sydney	10

Semi-finals
20 September – Sydney
Cronulla-Sutherland	26
North Queensland	18
21 September – Sydney
Sydney	40
Manly Warringah	16

Preliminary finals
27 September – Melbourne
Melbourne	48
Sydney	18
28 September – Sydney
Penrith	26
Cronulla-Sutherland	6

Grand final
6 October – Sydney
Melbourne	6
Penrith	14

=== Matches ===
Win Draw Loss Fixtures

QEF: 13 September 2024	Penrith Panthers	30–10	Sydney Roosters	Penrith
19:50 AEST	Tries: To'o 5'; Tago 10'; Luai 17'; Garner 22', 70'; Goals: Cleary 5/6 12', 19', 23', 34 pen', 71'	[Report Report]	Tries: Sua'ali'i 42'; Tedesco 46'; Goals: Sua'ali'i 1/2 48'	Stadium: BlueBet Stadium; Attendance: 21,483; Referee: Ashley Klein

SF: 21 September 2024	Sydney Roosters	40–16	Manly Warringah Sea Eagles	Moore Park
19:50 AEST	Tries: Radley 11'; Tedesco 31', 55'; S. Smith 35'; Tupou 41'; Young 76'; Goals: Sua'ali'i 7/7 12', 26 pen', 32', 37', 43', 52 pen', 57'; S. Smith 1/2 66'	[Report Report]	Tries: Olakau'atu 38'; Talau 59'; B. Trbojevic 73'; Goals: Garrick 2/3 60', 73'	Stadium: Allianz Stadium; Attendance: 40,818; Referee: Grant Atkins

PF: 27 September 2024	Melbourne Storm	48–18	Sydney Roosters	Melbourne
19:50 AEST	Tries: Papenhuyzen 12', 63'; Hughes 25', 38', 52'; Howarth 30'; Munster 74', 79'; Goals: Meaney 6/7 14', 27', 39', 43 pen', 54', 64'; Grant 1/1 75'; Wishart 1/1 80'; Sin bin: Asofa-Solomona (yellow card) 0' to 10'	[Report Report]	Tries: Tupou 8'; May 46'; N. Butcher 48'; Goals: Sua'ali'i 3/4 3 pen', 47', 50'	Stadium: AAMI Park; Attendance: 29,213; Referee: Grant Atkins

== Player statistics ==
As of 13 April 2024
