= 2023 Sydney Roosters season =

NRL rugby league season

- NRL Rank: See ladder on this page

Team information
- CEO: Joe Kelly
- Head Coach: Trent Robinson
- Captain: James Tedesco
- Stadium: Allianz Stadium - 42,500
- Avg. attendance: 0
- High attendance: 0
- Low attendance: 0

Top scorers
- Tries: Jaxson Paulo (6)
- Goals: Sam Walker (17)
- Points: Sam Walker (38)
| ← 2022 | List of seasons | 2024 → |

The 2023 Sydney Roosters season was the 116th in the club's history. They competed in the National Rugby League's 2023 Telstra Premiership. The Captain James Tedesco retained his club role for the 3rd consecutive year while Head Coach Trent Robinson maintains his position for the 11th consecutive season.

== Player movement ==
These movements happened across the previous season, off-season and pre-season.

=== Gains ===
| Player/Coach | Previous club | Length |
|---|---|---|
| Brandon Smith | Melbourne Storm | 2024 |
| Jake Turpin | Brisbane Broncos | 2023 |
| Jaxson Paulo | South Sydney Rabbitohs | 2023 |
| Corey Allen | Canterbury-Bankstown Bulldogs | 2023 |
| Nathan Brown | Parramatta Eels | 2023 |

=== Losses ===
| Player/Coach | New Club |
|---|---|
| Siosiua Taukeiaho | Catalans Dragons |
| Lachlan Lam | Leigh Leopards |
| Daniel Suluka-Fifita | South Sydney Rabbitohs |
| Adam Keighran | Catalans Dragons |
| Kevin Naiqama | Huddersfield Giants |
| Oliver Gildart | Dolphins |
| Sam Verrills | Gold Coast Titans |
| Renouf Atoni | Wakefield Trinity |
| Tuku Hau Tapuha | Cronulla-Sutherland Sharks |

== Pre-Season Challenge ==
| Date | Round | Opponent | Venue | Score | Tries | Goals | Attendance |
|---|---|---|---|---|---|---|---|
| Sunday, 12 February | Trial 1 | Melbourne Storm | GMHBA Stadium | 24 – 32 | Elie El-Zakhem 20'; Tyler Moriarty 25'; William Fakatoumafi 34'; Jaxson Paulo 46'; Victor Radley 50'; Junior Pauga 78' | Sandon Smith (3/3); Sam Walker (1/3) | 7,857 |
| Friday, 17 February | Trial 2 | Manly Warringah Sea Eagles | Industree Group Stadium | 16 – 28 | Nat Butcher 64'; Lindsay Collins 67'; Tuipulotu Katoa 69' | Sandon Smith (2/3) | 10,744 |

== Regular season ==
=== League table ===
2023 NRL season
| Pos | Team | Pld | W | D | L | B | PF | PA | PD | Pts |
|---|---|---|---|---|---|---|---|---|---|---|
| 1 | Penrith Panthers (P) | 24 | 18 | 0 | 6 | 3 | 645 | 312 | +333 | 42 |
| 2 | Brisbane Broncos | 24 | 18 | 0 | 6 | 3 | 639 | 425 | +214 | 42 |
| 3 | Melbourne Storm | 24 | 16 | 0 | 8 | 3 | 627 | 459 | +168 | 38 |
| 4 | New Zealand Warriors | 24 | 16 | 0 | 8 | 3 | 572 | 448 | +124 | 38 |
| 5 | Newcastle Knights | 24 | 14 | 1 | 9 | 3 | 626 | 451 | +175 | 35 |
| 6 | Cronulla-Sutherland Sharks | 24 | 14 | 0 | 10 | 3 | 619 | 497 | +122 | 34 |
| 7 | Sydney Roosters | 24 | 13 | 0 | 11 | 3 | 472 | 496 | −24 | 32 |
| 8 | Canberra Raiders | 24 | 13 | 0 | 11 | 3 | 486 | 623 | −137 | 32 |
| 9 | South Sydney Rabbitohs | 24 | 12 | 0 | 12 | 3 | 564 | 505 | +59 | 30 |
| 10 | Parramatta Eels | 24 | 12 | 0 | 12 | 3 | 587 | 574 | +13 | 30 |
| 11 | North Queensland Cowboys | 24 | 12 | 0 | 12 | 3 | 546 | 542 | +4 | 30 |
| 12 | Manly Warringah Sea Eagles | 24 | 11 | 1 | 12 | 3 | 545 | 539 | +6 | 29 |
| 13 | Dolphins | 24 | 9 | 0 | 15 | 3 | 520 | 631 | −111 | 24 |
| 14 | Gold Coast Titans | 24 | 9 | 0 | 15 | 3 | 527 | 653 | −126 | 24 |
| 15 | Canterbury-Bankstown Bulldogs | 24 | 7 | 0 | 17 | 3 | 438 | 769 | −331 | 20 |
| 16 | St. George Illawarra Dragons | 24 | 5 | 0 | 19 | 3 | 474 | 673 | −199 | 16 |
| 17 | Wests Tigers | 24 | 4 | 0 | 20 | 3 | 385 | 675 | −290 | 14 |

=== Matches ===
| Date | Round | Opponent | Venue | Score | Tries | Goals | Attendance |
|---|---|---|---|---|---|---|---|
| Sunday, 5 March | 1 | Dolphins | Lang Park | 28 – 18 | Joseph-Aukuso Suaalii 10'; Drew Hutchison 18'; Daniel Tupou 66' | Sam Walker (3/3) | 32,177 |
| Saturday, 11 March | 2 | New Zealand Warriors | Allianz Stadium | 20 – 12 | Jaxson Paulo 4', 47'; Sam Walker 57' | Sam Walker (2/3); PG:Sam Walker (2/3) | 16,267 |
| Friday, 17 March | 3 | South Sydney Rabbitohs | Allianz Stadium | 20 – 18 | Brandon Smith 33'; Daniel Tupou 37'; Jaxson Paulo 45', 65' | Sam Walker (2/4) | 36,639 |
| | 4 | BYE | | | | | |
| Thursday, 30 March | 5 | Parramatta Eels | Allianz Stadium | 28 – 20 | Drew Hutchison 13'; Daniel Tupou 32'; Luke Keary 38', 71'; Jaxson Paulo 54' | Sam Walker (3/5) | 20,886 |
| Thursday, 6 April | 6 | Melbourne Storm | AAMI Park | 28 – 8 | Jaxson Paulo 12' | Sam Walker (1/1); PG:Sam Walker (1/1) | 16,323 |
| Friday, 14 April | 7 | Cronulla-Sutherland Sharks | PointsBet Stadium | 22 – 12 | Egan Butcher 23'; Brandon Smith 31' | Sam Walker (2/2) | 11,489 |
| Tuesday, 25 April | 8 | St. George Illawarra Dragons | Allianz Stadium | 27 – 26 | James Tedesco 4'; Victor Radley 20'; Luke Keary 28'; Joseph Manu 45' | Joseph-Aukuso Suaalii (4/4); PG: Joseph-Aukuso Suaalii (1/1); FG: Luke Keary (1/1) | 40,191 |
| Friday, 30 April | 9 | New Zealand Warriors | Mount Smart Stadium | 0 – 14 | Nat Butcher 34'; Sitili Tupouniua 59' | Joseph-Aukuso Suaalii (2/2); PG: Joseph-Aukuso Suaalii (1/1) | 20,395 |
| Sunday, 7 May | 10 | North Queensland Cowboys | Lang Park | 6 – 20 | Angus Crichton 78' | Joseph-Aukuso Suaalii (1/1) | 45,085 |
| Friday, 12 May | 11 | Penrith Panthers | BlueBet Stadium | 48 – 4 | Corey Allan 64' | Joseph-Aukuso Suaalii (0/1) | 20,255 |
| Friday, 19 May | 12 | St. George Illawarra Dragons | Netstrata Jubilee Stadium | 24 – 22 | James Tedesco 50', 75'; Luke Keary 53', 61' | Joseph-Aukuso Suaalii (3/4) | 9,007 |
| | 13 | BYE | | | | | |
| Sunday, 4 June | 14 | Canterbury-Bankstown Bulldogs | Industree Group Stadium | 25 – 24 | James Tedesco 17', 22'; Junior Pauga 50'; Joseph-Aukuso Suaalii 67' | Joseph-Aukuso Suaalii (4/4); PG: Joseph-Aukuso Suaalii (0/1); FG: Luke Keary (1/1) | 18,338 |
| Saturday, 10 June | 15 | Penrith Panthers | Allianz Stadium | 6 – 30 | James Tedesco 60' | Luke Keary (1/1) | 23,610 |
| Saturday, 17 June | 16 | Newcastle Knights | McDonald Jones Stadium | 16 – 18 | Nat Butcher 8'; Joseph Manu 15'; Daniel Tupou 33' | Luke Keary (2/3); PG: Sandon Smith (1/1) | 21,966 |
| Sunday, 25 June | 17 | Canberra Raiders | Allianz Stadium | 18 – 20 | Joseph Manu 39', 42'; Lindsay Collins 75' | Sandon Smith (3/3) | 13,326 |
| Sunday, 2 July | 18 | Manly Warringah Sea Eagles | 4 Pines Park | 18 - 16 | Junior Pauga 22'; James Tedesco 31'; Joseph Manu 45' | Sandon Smith (2/3) | 17,385 |
| | 19 | BYE | | | | | |
| Saturday, 15 July | 20 | Melbourne Storm | Sydney Cricket Ground | 16 - 30 | Daniel Tupou 32', 77'; Siua Wong 79' | Joseph-Aukuso Suaalii (2/3) | 12,021 |
| Saturday, 22 July | 21 | Gold Coast Titans | Cbus Super Stadium | 18 - 36 | Egan Butcher 10'; James Tedesco 13'; Joseph-Aukuso Suaalii 22'; Lindsay Collins 28'; Nat Butcher 30'; Fletcher Baker 46' | Joseph-Aukuso Suaalii (5/6); PG: Joseph-Aukuso Suaalii (1/1) | 15,362 |
| Thursday, 27 July | 22 | Brisbane Broncos | The Gabba | 32 - 10 | Billy Smith 65'; Daniel Tupou 70' | Sandon Smith (1/2) | 21,841 |
| Thursday, 3 August | 23 | Manly Warringah Sea Eagles | Sydney Cricket Ground | | | | |
| Saturday, 12 August | 24 | Dolphins | Allianz Stadium | | | | |
| Friday, 18 August | 25 | Parramatta Eels | CommBank Stadium | | | | |
| Saturday, 26 August | 26 | Wests Tigers | Allianz Stadium | | | | |
| Friday, 1 September | 27 | South Sydney Rabbitohs | Accor Stadium | | | | |

== 2023 Squad ==
Sydney Roosters 2023 squad
| Top 30 squad - 2023 NRL season | | | Development players | Coaching staff |
|---|---|---|---|---|
| Corey Allan – WG, CE; Fletcher Baker – PR; Nathan Brown – LK; Egan Butcher – SR, PR; Nat Butcher – SR, PR; Lindsay Collins – PR; Angus Crichton – SR; Drew Hutchison – CE, HB; Luke Keary – FE, HB; Joseph Manu – CE, FE, FB | Terrell May – PR; Paul Momirovski – CE; Jaxson Paulo – WG; Victor Radley – LK, SR; Billy Smith – CE; Brandon Smith – HK; Joseph-Aukuso Suaalii – CE, WG; James Tedesco (c) – FB; Robert Toia – CE; Daniel Tupou – WG | Sitili Tupouniua – SR, LK; Jake Turpin – HK; Jared Waerea-Hargreaves (vc) – PR; Sam Walker – HB; Connor Watson – LK, HK; Siua Wong – SR; Naufahu Whyte – LK | Tom Deakin – HK; Vuate Karawalevu – WG; Tui Katoa – WG; Junior Pauga – WG; Sandon Smith – HB; Ben Thomas – PR; Extended squad: Zach Dockar-Clay – LK; Elie El-Zakhem – SR, PR; Dylan Napa – PR | Head coach: Trent Robinson; Assistant coaches: Matt King; Brett Morris; Boyd Cordner; Jake Friend; Cooper Cronk (Specialist Halves Coach); Jason Taylor (NSW Cup); Anthony Barnes (NSW Cup); Legend: (c) Captain(s); (vc) Vice-captain(s); Updated: 14 February 2023; Source(s): Roosters team profiles |
