= 2021 NRL finals series =

- Duration: 10 September 2021 – 3 October 2021
- Teams: 8
- Premiers: Penrith Panthers
- Minor premiers: Melbourne Storm
- Matches played: 9
- Broadcast partners: Nine Network; Fox League

The 2021 National Rugby League finals series was a tournament staged to determine the winner of the 2021 Telstra Premiership season. The series was played over four weekends in September and October, culminating in the 2021 NRL Grand Final on 3 October 2021. Due to the effects of the COVID-19 pandemic in New South Wales, the grand final was played outside of Sydney for the first time in competition history, at Brisbane's Suncorp Stadium.

The top eight teams from the 2021 NRL season qualified for the finals series. NRL finals series have been played under the current format since 2012.

== Qualification ==
2021 NRL season
Pos	Team	Pld	W	D	L	B	PF	PA	PD	Pts
1	Melbourne Storm	24	21	0	3	1	815	316	+499	44
2	Penrith Panthers (P)	24	21	0	3	1	676	286	+390	44
3	South Sydney Rabbitohs	24	20	0	4	1	775	453	+322	42
4	Manly-Warringah Sea Eagles	24	16	0	8	1	744	492	+252	34
5	Sydney Roosters	24	16	0	8	1	630	489	+141	34
6	Parramatta Eels	24	15	0	9	1	566	457	+109	32
7	Newcastle Knights	24	12	0	12	1	428	571	−143	26
8	Gold Coast Titans	24	10	0	14	1	580	583	−3	22
9	Cronulla-Sutherland Sharks	24	10	0	14	1	520	556	−36	22
10	Canberra Raiders	24	10	0	14	1	481	578	−97	22
11	St. George Illawarra Dragons	24	8	0	16	1	474	616	−142	18
12	New Zealand Warriors	24	8	0	16	1	453	624	−171	18
13	Wests Tigers	24	8	0	16	1	500	714	−214	18
14	Brisbane Broncos	24	7	0	17	1	446	695	−249	16
15	North Queensland Cowboys	24	7	0	17	1	460	748	−288	16
16	Canterbury-Bankstown Bulldogs	24	3	0	21	1	340	710	−370	8

== Venues ==
As a result of the 2021 NRL season's relocation to Queensland due to the COVID-19 pandemic in New South Wales and Victoria, all the finals matches were hosted in Queensland with stadiums at full capacity, with the only exception being the grand final at 75% capacity as a result of local COVID-19 cases and Queensland Government restrictions. This saw Rockhampton and Mackay host their first finals matches, whilst Queensland Country Bank Stadium also played host to their first finals at the venue.

Brisbane	Mackay	Rockhampton
Suncorp Stadium	BB Print Stadium	Browne Park
Capacity: 52,500	Capacity: 12,200	Capacity: 8,000
Games: 3	Games: 2	Games: 1
2021 NRL finals series is located in Queensland
Sunshine Coast	Townsville	
Sunshine Coast Stadium	Queensland Country Bank Stadium	
Capacity: 12,000	Capacity: 25,000	
Games: 1	Games: 2	

== Finals structure ==
The system used for the 2021 NRL finals series is a final eight system. The top four teams in the eight receive the "double chance" when they play in week-one qualifying finals, such that if a top-four team loses in the first week it still remains in the finals, playing a semi-final the next week against the winner of an elimination final. The bottom four of the eight play knock-out games – only the winners survive and move on to the next week. Home ground advantage goes to the team with the higher ladder position in the first two weeks and to the qualifying final winners in the third week.

In the second week, the winners of the qualifying finals receive a bye to the third week. The losers of the qualifying final plays the elimination finals winners in a semi-final. In the third week, the winners of the semi-finals from week two play the winners of the qualifying finals in the first week. The winners of those matches move on to the Grand Final.

=== Bracket ===
Qualifying and elimination finals
10 September – Sunshine Coast
1	Melbourne Storm	40
4	Manly Warringah Sea Eagles	12
11 September – Townsville
5	Sydney Roosters	25
8	Gold Coast Titans	24
12 September – Rockhampton
6	Parramatta Eels	28
7	Newcastle Knights	20
11 September – Townsville
2	Penrith Panthers	10
3	South Sydney Rabbitohs	16

Semi-finals
17 September – Mackay
Manly Warringah Sea Eagles	42
Sydney Roosters	6
18 September – Mackay
Penrith Panthers	8
Parramatta Eels	6

Preliminary finals
25 September – Brisbane
Melbourne Storm	6
Penrith Panthers	10
24 September – Brisbane
South Sydney Rabbitohs	36
Manly Warringah Sea Eagles	16

Grand final
3 October – Brisbane
Penrith Panthers	14
South Sydney Rabbitohs	12

=== Summary ===
Home	Score	Away	Match Information
Home	Score	Away	Date and Time	Venue	Referee	Crowd
Qualifying & Elimination Finals
Melbourne Storm	40 – 12	Manly Warringah Sea Eagles	Friday, 10 September, 7:50pm	Sunshine Coast Stadium	Grant Atkins	9,120
Sydney Roosters	25 – 24	Gold Coast Titans	Saturday, 11 September, 5:40pm	Queensland Country Bank Stadium	Adam Gee	15,237
Penrith Panthers	10 – 16	South Sydney Rabbitohs	Saturday, 11 September, 8:05pm	Queensland Country Bank Stadium	Gerard Sutton	18,244
Parramatta Eels	28 – 20	Newcastle Knights	Sunday, 12 September, 4:05pm	Browne Park	Ashley Klein	5,087
Semi-Finals
Manly Warringah Sea Eagles	42 – 6	Sydney Roosters	Friday, 17 September, 7:50pm	BB Print Stadium	Gerard Sutton	5,824
Penrith Panthers	8 – 6	Parramatta Eels	Saturday, 18 September, 7:50pm	BB Print Stadium	Ashley Klein	6,011
Preliminary Finals
South Sydney Rabbitohs	36 – 16	Manly Warringah Sea Eagles	Friday, 24 September, 8:05pm	Suncorp Stadium	Ashley Klein	26,249
Melbourne Storm	6 – 10	Penrith Panthers	Saturday, 25 September, 4:00pm	Suncorp Stadium	Gerard Sutton	29,011
Grand Final
Penrith Panthers	14 – 12	South Sydney Rabbitohs	Sunday, 3 October, 6:30pm (AEST), 7:30pm (AEDT)	Suncorp Stadium	Gerard Sutton	39,322

== Qualifying & Elimination Finals ==
=== 1st Qualifying Final (Melbourne v Manly Warringah) ===
The First Qualifying Final saw the 1st placed Melbourne Storm against the 4th placed Manly Warringah Sea Eagles. This was the fifth finals meeting between these clubs and the first since the 2012 Preliminary Final.

First qualifying final

Friday, 10 September
19:50 AEST (UTC+10)

Melbourne Storm	40 – 12	Manly Warringah Sea Eagles
Tries: 6 Papenhuyzen 39', 45'; Lumelume 3'; K Bromwich 10'; Welch 14'; Olam 77'; Goals: 7 Papenhuyzen 5', 15', pen 24', 40', 47', pen 61', 78' (7/8); Field goals: 1 Papenhuyzen 80' (2 pt)	1st: 24–6; 2nd: 16–6	Tries: 2 Saab 31', 51'; Goals: 2 Garrick 32', 53' (2/2)

Sunshine Coast Stadium, Sunshine Coast
Attendance: 9,120
Referee: Grant Atkins
Bunker: Ashley Klein
Touch judges: Todd Smith, Peter Gough

Team lists:

FB	1	Ryan Papenhuyzen
WG	2	George Jennings
CE	3	Reimis Smith
CE	4	Justin Olam
WG	5	Isaac Lumelume
FE	6	Cameron Munster
HB	7	Jahrome Hughes
PR	8	Jesse Bromwich (c)
HK	9	Brandon Smith
PR	10	Christian Welch
SR	11	Felise Kaufusi
SR	12	Kenneath Bromwich
LK	13	Dale Finucane
Substitutes:
IC	14	Harry Grant
IC	15	Tui Kamikamica
IC	16	Nelson Asofa-Solomona
IC	17	Nicho Hynes
Concussion Substitute:
RE	19	Tom Eisenhuth
Coach:
Craig Bellamy

FB	1	Tom Trbojevic
WG	2	Jason Saab
CE	3	Brad Parker
CE	4	Morgan Harper
WG	5	Reuben Garrick
FE	6	Kieran Foran
HB	7	Daly Cherry-Evans (c)
PR	8	Josh Aloiai
HK	15	Karl Lawton
PR	10	Martin Taupau
SR	11	Haumole Olakau'atu
SR	12	Josh Schuster
LK	13	Jake Trbojevic
Substitutes:
IC	14	Dylan Walker
IC	16	Sean Keppie
IC	17	Taniela Paseka
IC	20	Curtis Sironen
Concussion Substitute:
RE	19	Moses Suli
Coach:
Des Hasler

=== 1st Elimination Final (Sydney v Gold Coast) ===
The First Elimination Final saw the 5th placed Sydney Roosters against the 8th placed Gold Coast Titans. This was the second finals meeting between these clubs after meeting in the 2010 Preliminary Final.

First elimination final

Saturday, 11 September
17:40 AEST (UTC+10)

Sydney Roosters	25 – 24	Gold Coast Titans
Tries: 4 Ikuvalu 24'; Tedesco 32'; Tupou 42'; Morris 60'; Goals: 4 Keighran pen 11', 34', 43', 61' (4/5); Field goals: 1 Walker 78'	1st: 12–6; 2nd: 13–18	Tries: 4 Fermor 40'; Fa'asuamaleaui 47'; Kelly 55'; Wallace 69'; Goals: 4 Fogarty pen 14', 48', 56', 71' (4/5); Sin Bin: 1 Peachey (yellow card) 10' to 20'

Queensland Country Bank Stadium, Townsville
Attendance: 15,237
Referee: Adam Gee
Bunker: Steve Chiddy
Touch judges: Liam Kennedy, Chris Butler

Team lists:

FB	1	James Tedesco (c)
WG	2	Daniel Tupou
CE	3	Josh Morris
CE	4	Adam Keighran
WG	5	Matt Ikuvalu
FE	6	Drew Hutchison
HB	7	Lachlan Lam
PR	8	Jared Waerea-Hargreaves
HK	9	Sam Verrills
PR	15	Isaac Liu
SR	11	Angus Crichton
SR	12	Sitili Tupouniua
LK	13	Victor Radley
Substitutes:
IC	10	Siosuia Taukeiaho
IC	14	Sam Walker
IC	16	Egan Butcher
IC	17	Fletcher Baker
Concussion Substitute:
RE	18	Dale Copley
Coach:
Trent Robinson

FB	1	Jayden Campbell
WG	2	Phillip Sami
CE	3	Brian Kelly
CE	4	Patrick Herbert
WG	5	Corey Thompson
FE	6	Tyrone Peachey
HB	7	Jamal Fogarty (c)
PR	8	Jarrod Wallace
HK	9	Mitch Rein
PR	10	Moeaki Fotuaika
SR	11	Kevin Proctor
SR	12	Beau Fermor
LK	13	Tino Fa'asuamaleaui
Substitutes:
IC	14	Erin Clark
IC	15	Sam Lisone
IC	16	David Fifita
IC	17	Jaimin Jolliffe
Concussion Substitute:
RE	18	Sam McIntyre
Coach:
Justin Holbrook

=== 2nd Qualifying Final (Penrith v South Sydney) ===
The Second Qualifying Final saw the 2nd placed Penrith Panthers against the 3rd placed South Sydney Rabbitohs. This was the second finals meeting between these clubs and a rematch of the 2020 Preliminary Final.

Second qualifying final

Saturday, 11 September
19:50 AEST (UTC+10)

Penrith Panthers	10 – 16	South Sydney Rabbitohs
Tries: 1 Crichton 9'; Goals: 3 Cleary 10', pen 29', pen 40' (3/3)	1st: 10–10; 2nd: 0–6	Tries: 2 Walker 25'; Paulo 44'; Goals: 4 Reynolds pen 4', 27', pen 35', pen 65' (4/5)

Queensland Country Bank Stadium, Townsville
Attendance: 18,244
Referee: Gerard Sutton
Bunker: Alan Shortall
Touch judges: Dave Munro, Ziggy Przeklasa-Adamski

Team lists:

FB	2	Stephen Crichton
WG	5	Brian To'o
CE	3	Paul Momirovski
CE	4	Matt Burton
WG	20	Charlie Staines
FE	6	Jarome Luai
HB	7	Nathan Cleary (c)
PR	10	James Fisher-Harris
HK	9	Apisai Koroisau
PR	18	Matthew Eisenhuth
SR	12	Kurt Capewell
SR	17	Liam Martin
LK	13	Isaah Yeo
Substitutes:
IC	11	Viliame Kikau
IC	14	Mitch Kenny
IC	15	Spencer Leniu
IC	16	Tevita Pangai Junior
Concussion Substitute:
RE	19	Izack Tago
Coach:
Ivan Cleary

FB	1	Blake Taaffe
WG	2	Alex Johnston
CE	3	Dane Gagai
CE	4	Campbell Graham
WG	5	Jaxson Paulo
FE	6	Cody Walker
HB	7	Adam Reynolds (c)
PR	8	Mark Nicholls
HK	9	Damien Cook
PR	10	Tevita Tatola
SR	11	Keaon Koloamatangi
SR	12	Jaydn Su'A
LK	13	Cameron Murray
Substitutes:
IC	14	Benji Marshall
IC	15	Jacob Host
IC	16	Thomas Burgess
IC	17	Jai Arrow
Concussion Substitute:
RE	21	Patrick Mago
Coach:
Wayne Bennett

=== 2nd Elimination Final (Parramatta v Newcastle) ===
The Second Elimination Final saw the 6th placed Parramatta Eels against the 7th placed Newcastle Knights. This was the fourth finals meeting between these clubs and the first since the 2001 Grand Final.

Second elimination final

Sunday, 12 September
4:05pm

Parramatta Eels	28 – 20	Newcastle Knights
Tries: 5 Ferguson 38', 48'; Blake 10'; Moses 36'; Penisini pen 77'; Goals: 4 Moses 11', 38', 50', 78' (4/5)	1st: 16–10; 2nd: 12–10	Tries: 4 Tuala 2', 53', 58'; Hunt 25'; Goals: 2 Clifford 27', 54' (2/4)

Browne Park, Rockhampton
Attendance: 5,087
Referee: Ashley Klein
Bunker: Grant Atkins
Touch judges: Phil Henderson, Jon Stone

Team lists:

FB	1	Clinton Gutherson (c)
WG	2	Haze Dunster
CE	3	Will Penisini
CE	4	Waqa Blake
WG	5	Blake Ferguson
FE	6	Dylan Brown
HB	7	Mitchell Moses
PR	8	Reagan Campbell-Gillard
HK	9	Ray Stone
PR	10	Junior Paulo
SR	11	Shaun Lane
SR	12	Marata Niukore
LK	13	Nathan Brown
Substitutes:
IC	14	Will Smith
IC	15	Bryce Cartwright
IC	16	Isaiah Papali'i
IC	17	Makahesi Makatoa
Concussion Substitute:
RE	20	Tom Opacic
Coach:
Brad Arthur

FB	1	Kalyn Ponga
WG	2	Enari Tuala
CE	3	Kurt Mann
CE	4	Bradman Best
WG	5	Hymel Hunt
FE	6	Jake Clifford
HB	7	Mitchell Pearce
PR	8	Jacob Saifiti
HK	9	Jayden Brailey (c)
PR	10	Daniel Saifiti
SR	11	Tyson Frizell
SR	12	Mitchell Barnett
LK	13	Connor Watson
Substitutes:
IC	14	Sauaso Sue
IC	15	David Klemmer
IC	16	Josh King
IC	17	Brodie Jones
Concussion Substitute:
RE	20	Simi Sasagi
Coach:
Adam O'Brien

== Semi-finals ==
=== 1st Semi-Final (Manly Warringah v Sydney) ===
The First Semi-Final saw the loser of the First Qualifying Final, the Manly Warringah Sea Eagles against the winner of the First Elimination Final, the Sydney Roosters. This was the ninth finals meeting between the clubs and the first since the 2013 Grand Final.

Friday, 17 September
7:50pm

Manly Warringah Sea Eagles	42 – 6	Sydney Roosters
Tries: Tom Trbojevic (6', 46') 2 Kieran Foran (12') 1 Daly Cherry-Evans (18') 1 Morgan Harper (32') 1 Dylan Walker (48') 1 Jason Saab (69') 1 Goals: Reuben Garrick 7/7 (8', 14', 19', 34', 47', 50', 71')	1st: 24 – 6; 2nd: 18 – 0	Tries: 1 (25') Matt Ikuvalu; Goals: 1/2 Adam Keighran (40' pen)

BB Print Stadium, Mackay
Attendance: 5,824
Referee: Gerard Sutton

Team lists:

FB	1	Tom Trbojevic
WG	2	Jason Saab
CE	3	Brad Parker
CE	4	Morgan Harper
WG	5	Reuben Garrick
FE	6	Kieran Foran
HB	7	Daly Cherry-Evans (c)
PR	8	Josh Aloiai
HK	9	Lachlan Croker
PR	16	Sean Keppie
SR	11	Haumole Olakau'atu
SR	12	Josh Schuster
LK	13	Jake Trbojevic
Substitutes:
IC	10	Martin Taupau
IC	14	Dylan Walker
IC	15	Karl Lawton
IC	17	Taniela Paseka
Concussion Substitute:
RE	19	Moses Suli
Coach:
Des Hasler

Officials:

Gerard Sutton (Referee)

Dave Munro (Touch Judge)

Todd Smith (Touch Judge)

Ashley Klein (Bunker)

FB	1	James Tedesco (c)
WG	2	Daniel Tupou
CE	3	Josh Morris
CE	4	Adam Keighran
WG	5	Matt Ikuvalu
FE	6	Lachlan Lam
HB	7	Drew Hutchison
PR	8	Jared Waerea-Hargreaves
HK	20	Ben Marschke
PR	10	Isaac Liu
SR	11	Angus Crichton
SR	12	Sitili Tupouniua
LK	13	Victor Radley
Substitutes:
IC	14	Sam Walker
IC	15	Nat Butcher
IC	16	Egan Butcher
IC	17	Fletcher Baker
Concussion Substitute:
RE	18	Dale Copley
Coach:
Trent Robinson

=== 2nd Semi-Final (Penrith v Parramatta) ===
The Second Semi-Final saw the loser of the Second Qualifying Final, the Penrith Panthers against the winner of the Second Elimination Final, the Parramatta Eels. This was the third finals meeting between the clubs and the first since the 2000 Semi-Final.

Saturday, 18 September
7:50pm

Penrith Panthers	8 – 6	Parramatta Eels
Tries: Kurt Capewell (17') 1 Goals: Nathan Cleary 2/2 (18', 40' pen)	1st: 8 – 6; 2nd: 0 – 0	Tries: 1 (11') Waqa Blake; Goals: 1/1 Mitchell Moses (12')

BB Print Stadium, Mackay
Attendance: 6,011
Referee: Ashley Klein

Team lists:

FB	1	Dylan Edwards
WG	2	Stephen Crichton
CE	3	Paul Momirovski
CE	4	Matt Burton
WG	20	Brent Naden
FE	6	Jarome Luai
HB	7	Nathan Cleary (c)
PR	8	Moses Leota
HK	9	Apisai Koroisau
PR	10	James Fisher-Harris
SR	12	Kurt Capewell
SR	17	Liam Martin
LK	13	Isaah Yeo
Substitutes:
IC	11	Viliame Kikau
IC	14	Mitch Kenny
IC	15	Scott Sorensen
IC	16	Tevita Pangai Junior
Concussion Substitute:
RE	19	Izack Tago
Coach:
Ivan Cleary

Officials:

Ashley Klein (Referee)

Phil Henderson (Touch Judge)

Jon Stone (Touch Judge)

Grant Atkins (Bunker)

FB	1	Clinton Gutherson (c)
WG	2	Haze Dunster
CE	3	Will Penisini
CE	4	Waqa Blake
WG	5	Blake Ferguson
FE	6	Dylan Brown
HB	7	Mitchell Moses
PR	8	Reagan Campbell-Gillard
HK	9	Ray Stone
PR	10	Junior Paulo
SR	11	Shaun Lane
SR	12	Marata Niukore
LK	13	Nathan Brown
Substitutes:
IC	14	Will Smith
IC	15	Isaiah Papali'i
IC	16	Bryce Cartwright
IC	17	Ryan Matterson
Concussion Substitute:
RE	18	Makahesi Makatoa
Coach:
Brad Arthur

== Preliminary Finals ==
=== 2nd Preliminary Final (South Sydney v Manly Warringah) ===
The Second Preliminary Final saw the winner of the Second Qualifying Final, the South Sydney Rabbitohs against the winner of the First Semi-Final, the Manly Warringah Sea Eagles. This was the fourteenth finals meeting between these clubs and the first since the 2019 Semi-Final.

Friday, 24 September
8:05pm

South Sydney Rabbitohs	36 – 16	Manly Warringah Sea Eagles
Tries: Cody Walker (13', 29') 2 Jaxson Paulo (38', 60') 2 Alex Johnston (23', 80') 2 Campbell Graham (51') 1 Goals: Blake Taafe 4/7 (14', 24', 31', 52')	1st: 22 – 0; 2nd: 14 – 16	Tries: 2 (44', 77') Reuben Garrick; 1 (74') Tom Trbojevic; Goals: 2/3 Reuben Garrick (45', 78'); Sin Bin: (68') Josh Aloiai

Suncorp Stadium, Brisbane
Attendance: 26,249
Referee: Ashley Klein

Team lists:

FB	1	Blake Taaffe
WG	2	Alex Johnston
CE	3	Dane Gagai
CE	4	Campbell Graham
WG	5	Jaxson Paulo
FE	6	Cody Walker
HB	7	Adam Reynolds (c)
PR	8	Mark Nicholls
HK	9	Damien Cook
PR	10	Tevita Tatola
SR	11	Keaon Koloamatangi
SR	12	Jaydn Su'A
LK	13	Cameron Murray
Substitutes:
IC	14	Benji Marshall
IC	15	Jacob Host
IC	16	Thomas Burgess
IC	17	Jai Arrow
Concussion Substitute:
RE	19	Patrick Mago
Coach:
Wayne Bennett

Officials:

Ashley Klein (Referee)

Phil Henderson (Touch Judge)

Jon Stone (Touch Judge)

Grant Atkins (Bunker)

FB	1	Tom Trbojevic
WG	2	Jason Saab
CE	4	Morgan Harper
CE	19	Moses Suli
WG	5	Reuben Garrick
FE	6	Kieran Foran
HB	7	Daly Cherry-Evans (c)
PR	8	Josh Aloiai
HK	9	Lachlan Croker
PR	16	Sean Keppie
SR	11	Haumole Olakau'atu
SR	12	Josh Schuster
LK	13	Jake Trbojevic
Substitutes:
IC	10	Martin Taupau
IC	14	Dylan Walker
IC	15	Karl Lawton
IC	17	Taniela Paseka
Concussion Substitute:
RE	21	Tevita Funa
Coach:
Des Hasler

=== 1st Preliminary Final (Melbourne v Penrith) ===
The First Preliminary Final saw the winner of the First Qualifying Final, the Melbourne Storm against the winner of the Second Semi-Final, the Penrith Panthers. This was the second finals meeting between these clubs and a rematch of the 2020 Grand Final.

Saturday, 25 September
4:00pm

Melbourne Storm	6 – 10	Penrith Panthers
Tries: Ryan Papenhuyzen (63') 1 Goals: Ryan Papenhuyzen 1/1 (65')	1st: 0 – 6; 2nd: 6 – 4	Tries: 1 (3') Stephen Crichton; 1 (43') Brian To'o; Goals: 1/2 Nathan Cleary (5')

Suncorp Stadium, Brisbane
Attendance: 29,011
Referee: Gerard Sutton

Team lists:

FB	1	Ryan Papenhuyzen
WG	2	George Jennings
CE	3	Reimis Smith
CE	4	Justin Olam
WG	5	Josh Addo-Carr
FE	6	Cameron Munster
HB	7	Jahrome Hughes
PR	8	Jesse Bromwich (c)
HK	9	Brandon Smith
PR	10	Christian Welch
SR	11	Felise Kaufusi
SR	12	Kenneath Bromwich
LK	13	Dale Finucane
Substitutes:
IC	14	Harry Grant
IC	15	Tui Kamikamica
IC	16	Nelson Asofa-Solomona
IC	17	Nicho Hynes
Concussion Substitute:
RE	19	Tom Eisenhuth
Coach:
Craig Bellamy

Officials:

Gerard Sutton (Referee)

Dave Munro (Touch Judge)

Todd Smith (Touch Judge)

Ashley Klein (Bunker)

FB	1	Dylan Edwards
WG	2	Stephen Crichton
CE	3	Paul Momirovski
CE	4	Matt Burton
WG	21	Brian To'o
FE	6	Jarome Luai
HB	7	Nathan Cleary (c)
PR	10	James Fisher-Harris
HK	9	Apisai Koroisau
PR	16	Tevita Pangai Junior
SR	12	Kurt Capewell
SR	17	Liam Martin
LK	13	Isaah Yeo
Substitutes:
IC	11	Viliame Kikau
IC	14	Tyrone May
IC	15	Scott Sorensen
IC	19	Spencer Leniu
Concussion Substitute:
RE	5	Brent Naden
Coach:
Ivan Cleary

== Grand Final ==
The Grand Final saw the winner of the First Preliminary Final, the Penrith Panthers, against the winner of the Second Preliminary Final, the South Sydney Rabbitohs. This was the third finals meeting between the two sides, after the 2021 Qualifying Final, and the first Grand Final played between the teams.

2021 NRL Grand Final

Sunday, 3 October
18:35 AEST (UTC+10)

Penrith Panthers	14 – 12	South Sydney Rabbitohs
Tries: 2 Burton 17'; Crichton 67'; Goals: 3 Cleary 19', pen 33', 69' (3/3)	1st: 8–6; 2nd: 6–6	Tries: 2 Walker 21'; Johnston 75'; Goals: 2 Reynolds 23', pen 45' (2/3)

Suncorp Stadium, Brisbane
Attendance: 39,322
Referee: Gerard Sutton
Touch judges: Dave Munro, Todd Smith
Clive Churchill Medal: Nathan Cleary (Penrith)

Team lists:

FB	1	Dylan Edwards
WG	2	Stephen Crichton
CE	3	Paul Momirovski
CE	4	Matt Burton
WG	5	Brian To'o
FE	6	Jarome Luai
HB	7	Nathan Cleary (c)
PR	8	Moses Leota
HK	9	Apisai Koroisau
PR	10	James Fisher-Harris
SR	12	Liam Martin
SR	17	Kurt Capewell
LK	13	Isaah Yeo (c)
Substitutes:
IC	11	Viliame Kikau
IC	14	Tyrone May
IC	15	Scott Sorensen
IC	16	Spencer Leniu
Concussion Substitute:
RE	18	Brent Naden
Coach:
Ivan Cleary

Officials:

Gerard Sutton (Referee)

Dave Munro (Touch Judge)

Todd Smith (Touch Judge)

Grant Atkins (Bunker)

FB	1	Blake Taaffe
WG	2	Alex Johnston
CE	3	Dane Gagai
CE	4	Campbell Graham
WG	5	Jaxson Paulo
FE	6	Cody Walker
HB	7	Adam Reynolds (c)
PR	8	Mark Nicholls
HK	9	Damien Cook
PR	10	Tevita Tatola
SR	11	Keaon Koloamatangi
SR	12	Jaydn Su'A
LK	13	Cameron Murray
Substitutes:
IC	14	Benji Marshall
IC	15	Jacob Host
IC	16	Tom Burgess
IC	17	Jai Arrow
Concussion Substitute:
RE	19	Patrick Mago
Coach:
Wayne Bennett
