= 2020 NRL Finals Series =

- Duration: 2 Oct – 25 Oct 2020
- Teams: 8
- Premiers: Melbourne Storm
- Minor premiers: Penrith Panthers
- Matches played: 9
- Broadcast partners: Nine Network; Fox League
- Top try-scorer: Ryan Papenhuyzen (4) Nathan Cleary (4)

The 2020 National Rugby League finals series was a tournament staged to determine the winner of the 2020 Telstra Premiership season. The series was played over four weekends in October, culminating in the 2020 NRL Grand Final on 25 October 2020 at ANZ Stadium. The Grand Final was ultimately won by the second-placed Melbourne Storm, who defeated the minor premiers the Penrith Panthers 26–20.

The top eight teams from the 2020 NRL season qualify for the finals series. NRL finals series have been played under the current format since 2012.

== Qualification ==
2020 NRL season
Pos	Team	Pld	W	D	L	B	PF	PA	PD	Pts
1	Penrith Panthers	20	18	1	1	0	537	238	+299	37
2	Melbourne Storm (P)	20	16	0	4	0	534	276	+258	32
3	Parramatta Eels	20	15	0	5	0	392	288	+104	30
4	Sydney Roosters	20	14	0	6	0	552	322	+230	28
5	Canberra Raiders	20	14	0	6	0	445	317	+128	28
6	South Sydney Rabbitohs	20	12	0	8	0	521	352	+169	24
7	Newcastle Knights	20	11	1	8	0	421	374	+47	23
8	Cronulla-Sutherland Sharks	20	10	0	10	0	480	480	0	20
9	Gold Coast Titans	20	9	0	11	0	346	463	−117	18
10	New Zealand Warriors	20	8	0	12	0	343	458	−115	16
11	Wests Tigers	20	7	0	13	0	440	505	−65	14
12	St. George Illawarra Dragons	20	7	0	13	0	378	452	−74	14
13	Manly Warringah Sea Eagles	20	7	0	13	0	375	509	−134	14
14	North Queensland Cowboys	20	5	0	15	0	368	520	−152	10
15	Canterbury-Bankstown Bulldogs	20	3	0	17	0	282	504	−222	6
16	Brisbane Broncos	20	3	0	17	0	268	624	−356	6

== Venues and impact of the COVID-19 pandemic ==
For the 2020 NRL Finals Series, the stadia will be permitted to hold up to 50% of capacity under New South Wales, Australian Capital Territory and Queensland government guidelines. For the preliminary finals Lang Park's permitted capacity was increased to 75%.

Due to the second wave of the COVID-19 pandemic in Victoria, the Melbourne Storm will play their home finals at Suncorp Stadium in Brisbane rather than their regular home ground of AAMI Park in Melbourne. Suncorp will hold two games, Canberra's GIO Stadium will host one match and Sydney will host the remaining six matches, between ANZ Stadium, Bankwest Stadium, Panthers Stadium and the Sydney Cricket Ground.

Brisbane	Canberra	Sydney
Suncorp Stadium	GIO Stadium	ANZ Stadium
Capacity: 52,500	Capacity: 25,011	Capacity: 83,500
Games: 2	Games: 1	Games: 3
2020 NRL Finals Series is located in Australia
Sydney
Bankwest Stadium	Panthers Stadium	Sydney Cricket Ground
Capacity: 30,000	Capacity: 22,500	Capacity: 46,000
Games: 1	Games: 1	Games: 1

== Finals structure ==
The system used for the 2020 NRL finals series is a final eight system. The top four teams in the eight receive the "double chance" when they play in week-one qualifying finals, such that if a top-four team loses in the first week it still remains in the finals, playing a semi-final the next week against the winner of an elimination final. The bottom four of the eight play knock-out games – only the winners survive and move on to the next week. Home ground advantage goes to the team with the higher ladder position in the first two weeks and to the qualifying final winners in the third week.

In the second week, the winners of the qualifying finals receive a bye to the third week. The losers of the qualifying final plays the elimination finals winners in a semi-final. In the third week, the winners of the semi-finals from week two play the winners of the qualifying finals in the first week. The winners of those matches move on to the Grand Final.

=== Bracket ===
Qualifying and elimination finals
2 Oct, Panthers Stadium
1	Penrith	29
4	Sydney	28
3 Oct, GIO Stadium Canberra
5	Canberra	32
8	Cronulla-Sutherland	20
4 Oct, ANZ Stadium
6	South Sydney	46
7	Newcastle	20
3 Oct, Suncorp Stadium
2	Melbourne	36
3	Parramatta	24

Semi-finals
9 Oct, Sydney Cricket Ground
Sydney	18
Canberra	22
10 Oct, Bankwest Stadium
Parramatta	24
South Sydney	38

Preliminary finals
17 Oct, ANZ Stadium
Penrith	20
South Sydney	16
16 Oct, Suncorp Stadium
Melbourne	30
Canberra	10

Grand final
25 Oct, ANZ Stadium
Penrith	20
Melbourne	26

=== Summary ===
Home	Score	Away	Match Information
Home	Score	Away	Date and Time (Local)	Venue	Referees	Crowd
QUALIFYING & ELIMINATION FINALS
Penrith Panthers	29 – 28	Sydney Roosters	2 October 2020, 7:50 pm	Panthers Stadium	Gerard Sutton	7,209
Canberra Raiders	32 – 20	Cronulla-Sutherland Sharks	3 October 2020, 5:40 pm	GIO Stadium Canberra	Grant Atkins	9,602
Melbourne Storm	36 – 24	Parramatta Eels	3 October 2020, 7:50 pm	Suncorp Stadium	Ashley Klein	16,238
South Sydney Rabbitohs	46 – 20	Newcastle Knights	4 October 2020, 4:05 pm	ANZ Stadium	Ben Cummins	17,212
SEMI FINALS
Sydney Roosters	18 – 22	Canberra Raiders	9 October 2020, 7:55 pm	Sydney Cricket Ground	Ashley Klein	18,110
Parramatta Eels	24 – 38	South Sydney Rabbitohs	10 October 2020, 7:50 pm	Bankwest Stadium	Gerard Sutton	14,510
PRELIMINARY FINALS
Melbourne Storm	30 – 10	Canberra Raiders	16 October 2020, 7:50 pm	Suncorp Stadium	Ashley Klein	37,112
Penrith Panthers	20 – 16	South Sydney Rabbitohs	17 October 2020, 7:50 pm	ANZ Stadium	Gerard Sutton	30,116

† Match decided in extra time.

== Qualifying & elimination finals ==
=== 1st Qualifying final ===
Friday, 2 October
7:50pm

Penrith Panthers	29 – 28	Sydney Roosters
Tries: Nathan Cleary (22', 27', 37') 3 Josh Mansour (16') 1 Stephen Crichton (49') 1 Goals: Nathan Cleary 4/6 (23', 28', 39', 51'); Field Goals: Nathan Cleary (78') 1	1st 22 – 10; 2nd: 7 – 18	Tries: 2 (6', 64') Josh Morris; 1 (9') Freddy Lussick; 1 (53') James Tedesco; 1 (79') Angus Crichton; Goals: 4/5 Kyle Flanagan (7', 54', 65', 79')

Panthers Stadium, Sydney
Attendance: 7,209
Referee: Gerard Sutton
Player of the Match: Nathan Cleary

Team lists:

FB	1	Dylan Edwards
WG	2	Josh Mansour
CE	3	Brent Naden
CE	4	Stephen Crichton
WG	5	Brian To'o
FE	6	Jarome Luai
HB	7	Nathan Cleary
PR	8	James Tamou (c)
HK	9	Apisai Koroisau
PR	10	James Fisher-Harris
SR	11	Viliame Kikau
SR	12	Liam Martin
LK	13	Isaah Yeo
Substitutes:
IC	14	Tyrone May
IC	15	Kurt Capewell
IC	16	Moses Leota
IC	17	Zane Tetevano
Coach:
Ivan Cleary

FB	1	James Tedesco
WG	2	Daniel Tupou
CE	3	Josh Morris
CE	4	Joseph Manu
WG	5	Brett Morris
FE	6	Luke Keary
HB	7	Kyle Flanagan
PR	8	Jared Waerea-Hargreaves
HK	9	Freddy Lussick
PR	10	Siosuia Taukeiaho
SR	11	Boyd Cordner (c)
SR	16	Angus Crichton
LK	13	Isaac Liu
Substitutes:
IC	12	Sitili Tupouniua
IC	15	Lindsay Collins
IC	18	Nat Butcher
IC	19	Mitchell Aubusson
Coach:
Trent Robinson

=== 1st Elimination final ===
Saturday, 3 October
5:40pm

Canberra Raiders	32 – 20	Cronulla-Sutherland Sharks
Tries: Jack Wighton (47', 50') 2 George Williams (38', 58') 2 Joseph Tapine (9') 1 Elliott Whitehead (67') 1 Goals: Jarrod Croker 4/6 (11', 48', 51', 59')	1st: 10 – 14; 2nd: 22 – 6	Tries: 1 (19') Ronaldo Mulitalo; 1 (27') Blayke Brailey; 1 (79') Sione Katoa; Goals: 4/5 Chad Townsend (6' pen, 23' pen, 28', 80')

GIO Stadium, Canberra
Attendance: 9,602
Referee: Grant Atkins
Player of the Match: Jack Wighton

Team lists:

FB	1	Charnze Nicoll-Klokstad
WG	2	Semi Valemei
CE	3	Jarrod Croker (c)
CE	4	Jordan Rapana
WG	5	Nick Cotric
FE	6	Jack Wighton
HB	7	George Williams
PR	8	Josh Papalii
HK	9	Tom Starling
PR	15	Sia Soliola
SR	11	John Bateman
SR	12	Elliott Whitehead
LK	13	Joseph Tapine
Substitutes:
IC	10	Dunamis Lui
IC	14	Siliva Havili
IC	16	Hudson Young
IC	17	Corey Harawira-Naera
Coach:
Ricky Stuart

FB	1	William Kennedy
WG	2	Sione Katoa
CE	3	Josh Dugan
CE	4	Jesse Ramien
WG	5	Ronaldo Mulitalo
FE	6	Connor Tracey
HB	7	Chad Townsend
PR	8	Braden Hamlin-Uele
HK	9	Blayke Brailey
PR	13	Toby Rudolf
SR	11	Briton Nikora
SR	12	Wade Graham (c)
LK	14	Siosifa Talakai
Substitutes:
IC	10	Aaron Woods
IC	15	Scott Sorensen
IC	16	Andrew Fifita
IC	17	Jack Williams
Coach:
John Morris

=== 2nd Qualifying final ===
Saturday, 3 October
7:50pm

Melbourne Storm	36 – 24	Parramatta Eels
Tries: Ryan Papenhuyzen (33', 63') 2 Suliasi Vunivalu (30') 1 Josh Addo-Carr (43') 1 Jesse Bromwich (55') 1 Brenko Lee (58') 1 Goals: Cameron Smith 6/6 (32', 34', 44', 56', 59', 64')	1st: 12 – 12; 2nd: 24 – 12	Tries: 1 (2') Nathan Brown; 1 (22') Clinton Gutherson; 1 (50') Blake Ferguson; 1 (67') Shaun Lane; Goals: 4/4 Mitchell Moses (3', 23', 51', 69')

Suncorp Stadium, Brisbane
Attendance: 16,238
Referee: Ashley Klein
Player of the Match: Ryan Papenhuyzen

Team lists:

FB	1	Ryan Papenhuyzen
WG	2	Suliasi Vunivalu
CE	3	Brenko Lee
CE	4	Justin Olam
WG	5	Josh Addo-Carr
FE	6	Cameron Munster
HB	7	Jahrome Hughes
PR	8	Jesse Bromwich
HK	9	Cameron Smith (c)
PR	10	Christian Welch
SR	11	Felise Kaufusi
SR	12	Kenny Bromwich
LK	13	Nelson Asofa-Solomona
Substitutes:
IC	14	Brandon Smith
IC	15	Tino Fa'asuamaleaui
IC	17	Nicho Hynes
IC	22	Chris Lewis
Coach:
Craig Bellamy

FB	1	Clinton Gutherson (c)
WG	2	Maika Sivo
CE	3	Michael Jennings
CE	4	Waqa Blake
WG	5	Blake Ferguson
FE	6	Dylan Brown
HB	7	Mitchell Moses
PR	8	Reagan Campbell-Gillard
HK	9	Reed Mahoney
PR	10	Junior Paulo
SR	11	Shaun Lane
SR	12	Ryan Matterson
LK	13	Nathan Brown
Substitutes:
IC	14	Will Smith
IC	15	Andrew Davey
IC	16	Kane Evans
IC	17	Marata Niukore
Coach:
Brad Arthur

=== 2nd Elimination final ===
Sunday, 4 October
4:05pm

South Sydney Rabbitohs	46 – 20	Newcastle Knights
Tries: Alex Johnston (24', 69') 2 Tevita Tatola (62', 75') 2 Corey Allan (16') 1 Cody Walker (20') 1 Cameron Murray (36') 1 Damian Cook (76') 1 Goals: Adam Reynolds 6/8 (21', 38', 48' pen, 63', 71', 75'); Dane Gagai 1/1 (78')	1st: 20 – 14; 2nd: 26 – 6	Tries: 2 (2', 80') Hymel Hunt; 1 (7') Bradman Best; Goals: 3/3 Kalyn Ponga (3', 9', 12' pen); 1/1 Aidan Guerra (80')

ANZ Stadium, Sydney
Attendance: 17,212
Referee: Ben Cummins
Player of the Match: Damien Cook

Team lists:

FB	1	Corey Allan
WG	2	Alex Johnston
CE	3	Campbell Graham
CE	4	Dane Gagai
WG	5	Jaxson Paulo
FE	6	Cody Walker
HB	7	Adam Reynolds (c)
PR	8	Tevita Tatola
HK	9	Damien Cook
PR	10	Thomas Burgess
SR	12	Bayley Sironen
SR	15	Liam Knight
LK	13	Cameron Murray
Substitutes:
IC	11	Jaydn Su'A
IC	14	Mark Nicholls
IC	16	Jed Cartwright
IC	17	Keaon Koloamatangi
Coach:
Wayne Bennett

FB	1	Kalyn Ponga
WG	2	Edrick Lee
CE	3	Enari Tuala
CE	4	Bradman Best
WG	5	Hymel Hunt
FE	9	Kurt Mann
HB	7	Mitchell Pearce (c)
PR	8	David Klemmer
HK	14	Chris Randall
PR	10	Daniel Saifiti
SR	11	Lachlan Fitzgibbon
SR	13	Mitchell Barnett
LK	16	Herman Ese'ese
Substitutes:
IC	12	Aidan Guerra
IC	15	Jacob Saifiti
IC	17	Sione Mata'utia
IC	20	Tex Hoy
Coach:
Adam O'Brien

== Semi-finals ==
=== 1st Semi-final ===
Friday, 9 October
7:55pm

Sydney Roosters	18 – 22	Canberra Raiders
Tries: James Tedesco (36', 75') 2 Joseph Manu (58') 1 Goals: Kyle Flanagan 3/3 (38', 59', 76')	1st: 6 – 16; 2nd: 12 – 6	Tries: 1 (5') Josh Papalii; 1 (18') George Williams; 1 (23') Joseph Tapine; 1 (69') Jack Wighton; Goals: 3/4 Jarrod Croker (6', 20', 71')

Sydney Cricket Ground, Sydney
Attendance: 18,110
Referee: Ashley Klein
Player of the Match: Charnze Nicoll-Klokstad

Team lists:

FB	1	James Tedesco
WG	2	Daniel Tupou
CE	3	Josh Morris
CE	4	Joseph Manu
WG	5	Brett Morris
FE	6	Luke Keary
HB	7	Kyle Flanagan
PR	8	Jared Waerea-Hargreaves
HK	9	Jake Friend (c)
PR	10	Siosuia Taukeiaho
SR	11	Boyd Cordner (c)
SR	16	Mitchell Aubusson
LK	13	Isaac Liu
Substitutes:
IC	12	Angus Crichton
IC	15	Sitili Tupouniua
IC	17	Sonny Bill Williams
IC	18	Nat Butcher
Coach:
Trent Robinson

FB	1	Charnze Nicoll-Klokstad
WG	2	Semi Valemei
CE	3	Jarrod Croker (c)
CE	4	Jordan Rapana
WG	5	Nick Cotric
FE	6	Jack Wighton
HB	7	George Williams
PR	8	Josh Papalii
HK	14	Siliva Havili
PR	16	Hudson Young
SR	11	John Bateman
SR	12	Elliott Whitehead
LK	13	Joseph Tapine
Substitutes:
IC	9	Tom Starling
IC	10	Sia Soliola
IC	15	Dunamis Lui
IC	17	Corey Harawira-Naera
Coach:
Ricky Stuart

=== 2nd Semi-final ===
Saturday, 10 October
7:50pm

Parramatta Eels	24 – 38	South Sydney Rabbitohs
Tries: Clinton Gutherson (24', 29') 2 George Jennings (26', 75') 2 Goals: Mitchell Moses 4/4 (25', 27', 30', 76')	1st: 18 – 8; 2nd: 6 – 30	Tries: 2 (17', 71') Jaxson Paulo; 1 (46') Liam Knight; 1 (55') Cameron Murray; 1 (63') Bayley Sironen; 1 (79') Damien Cook; Goals: 7/7 Adam Reynolds (5' pen, 19', 48', 56', 64', 72', 80')

Bankwest Stadium, Sydney
Attendance: 14,510
Referee: Gerard Sutton
Player of the Match: Damien Cook

Team lists:

FB	1	Clinton Gutherson (c)
WG	2	George Jennings
CE	4	Waqa Blake
CE	19	Brad Takairangi
WG	20	Haze Dunster
FE	6	Dylan Brown
HB	7	Mitchell Moses
PR	8	Reagan Campbell-Gillard
HK	9	Reed Mahoney
PR	10	Junior Paulo
SR	11	Shaun Lane
SR	12	Ryan Matterson
LK	13	Nathan Brown
Substitutes:
IC	14	Will Smith
IC	15	Andrew Davey
IC	16	Kane Evans
IC	17	Ray Stone
Coach:
Brad Arthur

FB	1	Corey Allan
WG	2	Alex Johnston
CE	3	Campbell Graham
CE	4	Dane Gagai
WG	5	Jaxson Paulo
FE	6	Cody Walker
HB	7	Adam Reynolds (c)
PR	8	Tevita Tatola
HK	9	Damien Cook
PR	10	Thomas Burgess
SR	11	Jaydn Su'A
SR	12	Bayley Sironen
LK	13	Cameron Murray
Substitutes:
IC	14	Mark Nicholls
IC	15	Liam Knight
IC	16	Jed Cartwright
IC	17	Keaon Koloamatangi
Coach:
Wayne Bennett

== Preliminary finals ==
=== 1st Preliminary Final ===
Friday, 16 October
7:50pm

Melbourne Storm	30 – 10	Canberra Raiders
Tries: Jesse Bromwich (4') 1 Ryan Papenhuyzen (6') 1 Suliasi Vunivalu (9') 1 Justin Olam (22') 1 Dale Finucane (62') 1 Goals: Cameron Smith 5/6 (6', 8', 15' pen, 24', 63')	1st: 24 – 6; 2nd: 6 – 4	Tries: 2 (29', 71') Nick Cotric; Goals: 1/2 Jarrod Croker (31')

Suncorp Stadium, Brisbane
Attendance: 37,112
Referee: Ashley Klein
Player of the Match: Jahrome Hughes

Team lists:

FB	1	Ryan Papenhuyzen
WG	2	Suliasi Vunivalu
CE	3	Brenko Lee
CE	4	Justin Olam
WG	5	Josh Addo-Carr
FE	6	Cameron Munster
HB	7	Jahrome Hughes
PR	8	Jesse Bromwich
HK	9	Cameron Smith (c)
PR	10	Christian Welch
SR	11	Felise Kaufusi
SR	12	Kenny Bromwich
LK	13	Nelson Asofa-Solomona
Substitutes:
IC	14	Brandon Smith
IC	15	Tino Fa'asuamaleaui
IC	17	Nicho Hynes
IC	18	Dale Finucane
Coach:
Craig Bellamy

FB	1	Charnze Nicoll-Klokstad
WG	2	Semi Valemei
CE	3	Jarrod Croker (c)
CE	4	Jordan Rapana
WG	5	Nick Cotric
FE	6	Jack Wighton
HB	7	George Williams
PR	8	Josh Papalii
HK	14	Siliva Havili
PR	16	Hudson Young
SR	11	John Bateman
SR	12	Elliott Whitehead
LK	13	Joseph Tapine
Substitutes:
IC	9	Tom Starling
IC	10	Sia Soliola
IC	15	Dunamis Lui
IC	17	Corey Harawira-Naera
Coach:
Ricky Stuart

=== 2nd Preliminary Final ===
Saturday, 17 October
7:50pm

Penrith Panthers	20 – 16	South Sydney Rabbitohs
Tries: Brian To'o (8') 1 Tyrone May (27') 1 Dylan Edwards (67') 1 Goals: Nathan Cleary 4/4 (9', 29', 40' pen, 69')	1st: 14 – 6; 2nd: 6 – 10	Tries: 1 (5') Alex Johnston; 1 (50') Dane Gagai; 1 (73') Corey Allan; Goals: 2/4 Adam Reynolds (6', 51')

ANZ Stadium, Sydney
Attendance: 30,116
Referee: Gerard Sutton
Player of the Match: Apisai Koroisau

Team lists:

FB	1	Dylan Edwards
WG	2	Josh Mansour
CE	4	Stephen Crichton
CE	14	Tyrone May
WG	5	Brian To'o
FE	6	Jarome Luai
HB	7	Nathan Cleary
PR	8	James Tamou (c)
HK	9	Apisai Koroisau
PR	10	James Fisher-Harris
SR	11	Kurt Capewell
SR	12	Liam Martin
LK	13	Isaah Yeo
Substitutes:
IC	3	Brent Naden
IC	16	Moses Leota
IC	17	Zane Tetevano
IC	18	Mitch Kenny
Coach:
Ivan Cleary

FB	1	Corey Allan
WG	2	Alex Johnston
CE	4	Dane Gagai
CE	12	Bayley Sironen
WG	5	Jaxson Paulo
FE	6	Cody Walker
HB	7	Adam Reynolds (c)
PR	8	Tevita Tatola
HK	9	Damien Cook
PR	10	Thomas Burgess
SR	11	Jaydn Su'A
SR	13	Cameron Murray
LK	15	Liam Knight
Substitutes:
IC	14	Mark Nicholls
IC	16	Jed Cartwright
IC	17	Keaon Koloamatangi
IC	19	Hame Sele
Coach:
Wayne Bennett

== Grand Final ==
2020 NRL Grand Final

Sunday, 25 October
19:40 AEDT (UTC+11)

Penrith Panthers	20 – 26	Melbourne Storm
Tries: 4 To'o 52'; Crichton 68'; Mansour 71'; Cleary 79'; Goals: 2 Cleary 53', 69' (2/3)	1st: 0–22; 2nd: 20–4; Report	Tries: 4 Olam (penalty) 3'; Vunivalu 30'; C. Smith 39'; Papenhuzen 45'; Goals: 5 C. Smith 4', pen 22', pen 26', 31', 40' (5/6); Sin bin: Hughes (yellow card) 70' to 80'; B. Smith (yellow card) 79' to 80'

ANZ Stadium, Sydney
Attendance: 37,303
Referee: Gerard Sutton
Touch judges: Chris Butler, Todd Smith
Clive Churchill Medal: Ryan Papenhuyzen (Melbourne)

Team lists:

FB	1	Dylan Edwards
WG	2	Josh Mansour
CE	3	Brent Naden
CE	4	Stephen Crichton
WG	5	Brian To'o
FE	6	Jarome Luai
HB	7	Nathan Cleary
PR	8	James Tamou (c)
HK	9	Apisai Koroisau
PR	10	James Fisher-Harris
SR	11	Viliame Kikau
SR	12	Liam Martin
LK	13	Isaah Yeo
Substitutes:
IC	14	Tyrone May
IC	15	Kurt Capewell
IC	16	Moses Leota
IC	17	Zane Tetevano
Coach:
Ivan Cleary

FB	1	Ryan Papenhuyzen
WG	2	Suliasi Vunivalu
CE	3	Brenko Lee
CE	4	Justin Olam
WG	5	Josh Addo-Carr
FE	6	Cameron Munster
HB	7	Jahrome Hughes
PR	8	Jesse Bromwich
HK	9	Cameron Smith (c)
PR	10	Christian Welch
SR	11	Felise Kaufusi
SR	12	Kenny Bromwich
LK	13	Nelson Asofa-Solomona
Substitutes:
IC	14	Brandon Smith
IC	15	Tino Fa'asuamaleaui
IC	16	Dale Finucane
IC	17	Nicho Hynes
Coach:
Craig Bellamy
