= Blake Steep =

Australian rugby league player (born 2005)

Personal information
- Full name: Blake Steep
- Born: 28 April 2005 (age 21) Port Macquarie, New South Wales
- Height: 187 cm (6 ft 2 in)
- Weight: 99 kg (15 st 8 lb)

Playing information
- Position: Lock
Club
Years	Team	Pld	T	G	FG	P
2024–	Sydney Roosters	28	2	0	0	8
- Source: As of 21 November 2026

Blake Steep (born 28 April 2005) is an Australian professional rugby league footballer who plays as a lock forward for the Sydney Roosters in the National Rugby League.

== Career ==
Steep was selected for the NSW U19's squad in 2024, playing Lock.

In round 13 of the 2024 NRL season, Steep made his first grade debut against the North Queensland Cowboys at Allianz Stadium coming off the bench in a 18–16 loss. On 22 November 2024, Steep re-signed with the Sydney Roosters until the end of 2026. Steep played 22 games for the Sydney Roosters in the 2025 NRL season as the club finished 8th on the table and qualified for the finals. Steep played in the clubs elimination final loss against Cronulla.

On 6 November, Steep re-signed with the Roosters until the end of 2028.

== Statistics ==
Year	Team	Games	Tries	Pts
2024	Sydney Roosters	3	1	4
2025	Sydney Roosters	22	1	4
2026	Sydney Roosters	3		
2027	Sydney Roosters			
	Totals	28	2	8
