= Max McCathie =

Australian rugby league footballer (born 2003)

Personal information
- Full name: Max McCathie
- Born: 10 July 2003 (age 23) Sydney, New South Wales, Australia
- Height: 188 cm (6 ft 2 in)
- Weight: 99 kg (15 st 8 lb)

Playing information
- Position: Lock, Second-row
Club
Years	Team	Pld	T	G	FG	P
2025–	Sydney Roosters	1	0	0	0	0
- Source: As of 13 October 2025

Max McCathie (born 10 July 2003) is an Australian professional rugby league footballer who plays as a lock and second-row forward for the Sydney Roosters in the National Rugby League.

== Background ==
McCathie attended Scot's College and was a Paddington Colts junior. He went through the Sydney Roosters junior system playing for every grade.

== Career ==
In Round 18 2025, McCathie made his NRL debut for the Roosters against the Wests Tigers at Allianz Stadium. Coming off the bench in a 30-28 loss.
