= Sean Keppie =

Australian rugby league footballer

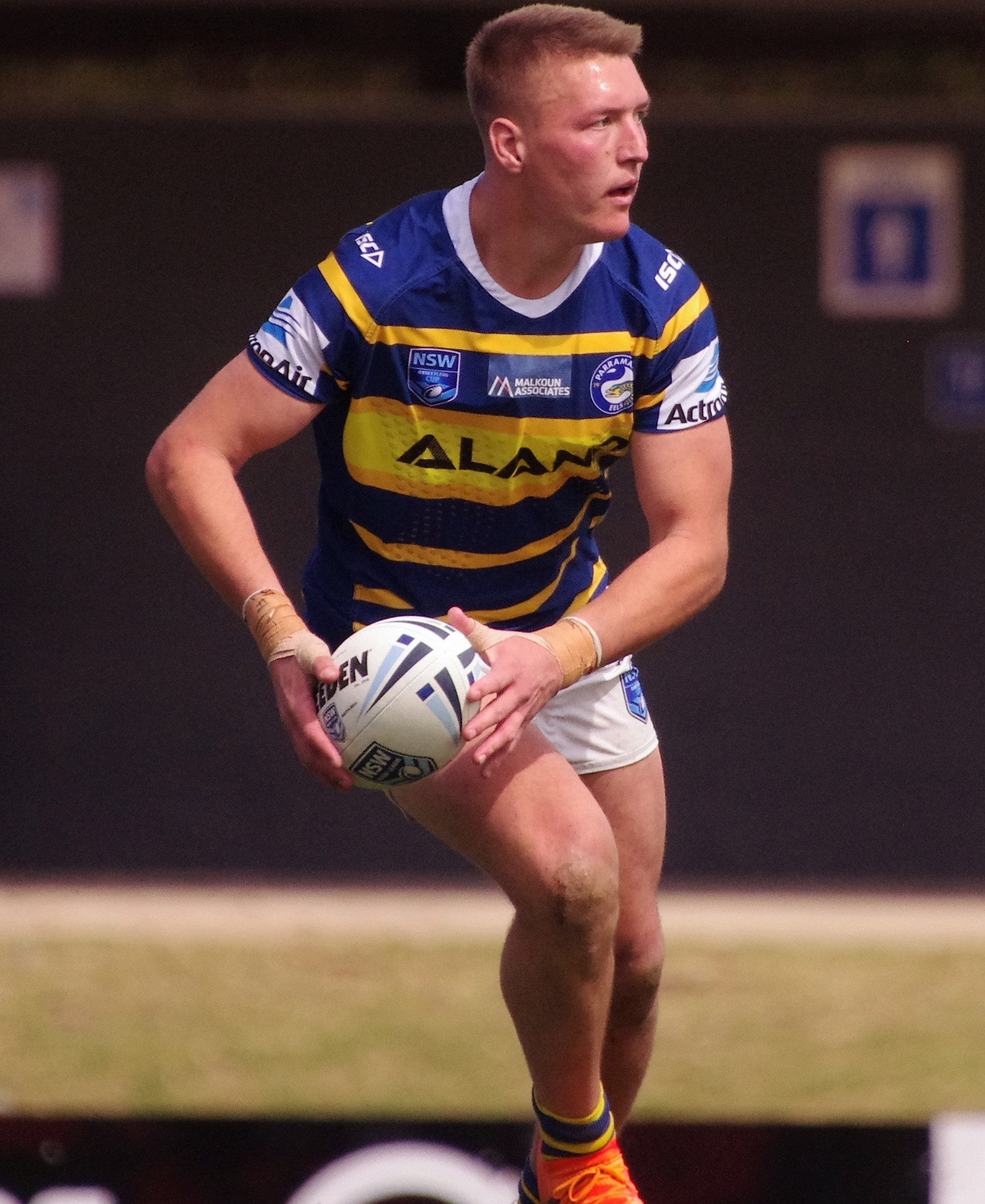

Personal information
- Full name: Sean Keppie
- Born: 20 May 1998 (age 28) Camden, New South Wales, Australia
- Height: 193 cm (6 ft 4 in)
- Weight: 110 kg (17 st 5 lb)

Playing information
- Position: Prop, Lock
Club
Years	Team	Pld	T	G	FG	P
2019–23	Manly Sea Eagles	79	2	0	0	8
2024–	South Sydney	60	3	0	0	12
	Total	139	5	0	0	20
- Source: As of 11 September 2026

Sean Keppie (born 20 May 1998) is an Australian professional rugby league footballer who plays as a prop for the South Sydney Rabbitohs in the National Rugby League (NRL).

== Background ==
Keppie played his junior rugby league for the Narellan Jets in the Group 6 Junior Rugby League.

== Playing career ==
Keppie made his NRL debut for Manly against the Parramatta Eels in round 25 of the 2019 NRL season at Bankwest Stadium. Keppie then featured in both of Manly's finals games in the 2019 finals series as Manly reached the second week until they were eliminated by South Sydney in the semi-finals.

Keppie played 19 games for Manly-Warringah in the 2020 NRL season as they finished 13th on the table.

Keppie played 20 games for Manly in the 2021 NRL season including the club's preliminary final loss against South Sydney.

=== 2022 ===
Keppie played 17 games for Manly in the 2022 NRL season which saw the club miss the finals.

=== 2023 ===
Keppie played 20 games for Manly in the 2023 NRL season as the club finished 12th on the table and missed the finals once again.

=== 2024 ===
Keppie signed a three-year deal with the South Sydney Rabbitohs starting from the 2024 season. Keppie played 21 games for South Sydney in the 2024 NRL season as the club finished second last on the table.

=== 2025 ===
Keppie played 21 games for South Sydney in the 2025 NRL season which saw the club finish 14th on the table.

=== 2026 ===
On 13 August, Keppie re-signed with the club for a further two years. Keppie played 18 matches for South Sydney in the 2026 NRL season as the club finished 6th on the table and qualified for the finals.

== Statistics ==
Year	Team	Games	Tries	Pts
2019	Manly Warringah Sea Eagles	3		
2020	Manly Warringah Sea Eagles	19		
2021	Manly Warringah Sea Eagles	20	1	4
2022	Manly Warringah Sea Eagles	17		
2023	Manly Warringah Sea Eagles	20	1	4
2024	South Sydney Rabbitohs	21	1	4
2025	South Sydney Rabbitohs	21	1	4
2026	South Sydney Rabbitohs	4		
	Totals	125	4	16
