= Fletcher Baker =

Australian rugby league footballer

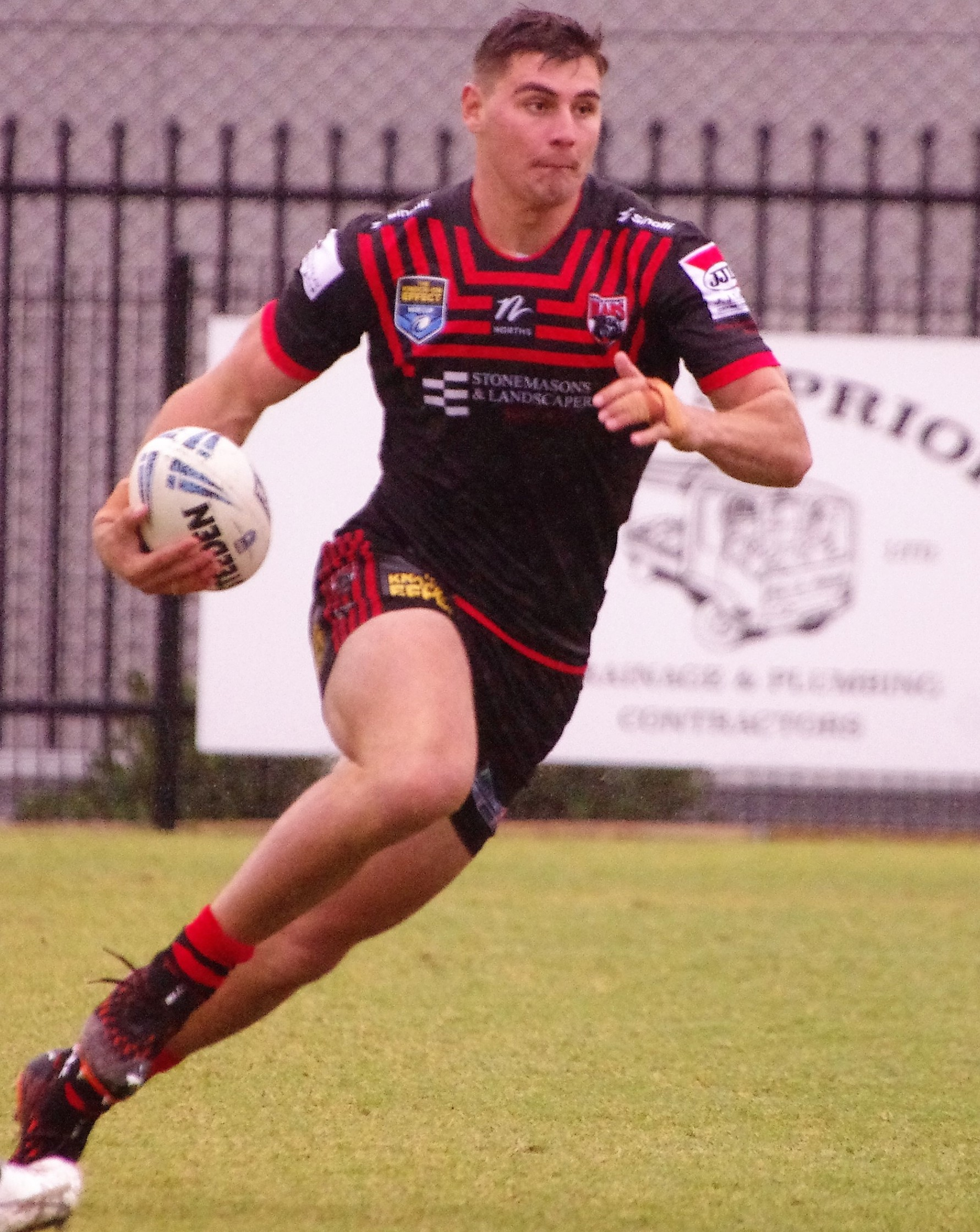

Personal information
- Born: 26 December 1999 (age 26) Muswellbrook, New South Wales, Australia
- Height: 194 cm (6 ft 4 in)
- Weight: 107 kg (16 st 12 lb)

Playing information
- Position: Prop, Second-row
Club
Years	Team	Pld	T	G	FG	P
2021–23	Sydney Roosters	45	3	0	0	12
2024–25	Brisbane Broncos	14	0	0	0	0
2026	Manly Sea Eagles	2	0	0	0	0
	Total	61	3	0	0	12
- Source: As of 10 November 2026

Fletcher Baker (born 26 December 1999) is a professional rugby league footballer who most recently played as a prop forward for the Manly Warringah Sea Eagles in the National Rugby League.

He previously played for the Brisbane Broncos and Sydney Roosters in the National Rugby League (NRL).

== Background ==
Baker played his junior rugby league for the Muswellbrook Rams. Before making his first grade debut for the Sydney Roosters, he played for the club's feeder side North Sydney in the NSW Cup.

== Playing career ==
In round 2 of the 2021 NRL season, Baker made his NRL debut against the Wests Tigers at Campbelltown Stadium and scored a try in a 40–6 victory.

Baker played a total of 16 games for the Sydney Roosters in the 2021 NRL season including the club's two finals matches. The Sydney Roosters would be eliminated from the second week of the finals losing to Manly 42-6. On 24 September 2023, Baker played for North Sydney in their 2023 NSW Cup grand final loss against South Sydney. The prop played 12 games for Brisbane in the 2024 NRL season which saw the club miss the finals finishing 12th on the table. Baker featured in just two first grade games in 2025 but did play in the Burleigh Bears Queensland Cup premiership. Fletcher then left the Broncos at the end of season.

On 10 November 2025, it was announced that Baker signed a development deal with Canterbury for the 2026 season.

On June 3, 2026, the Canterbury club announced that Baker had been released to take up an opportunity with another NRL team. Journalist Tony Adams announced that he had signed for Manly effectively immediately. In September 2026, Baker was one of twelve players released by Manly.

== Statistics ==
Year	Team	Games	Tries	Pts
2021	Sydney Roosters	16	2	8
2022	Sydney Roosters	14		
2023	Sydney Roosters	16	1	4
2024	Brisbane Broncos	12		
2025	Brisbane Broncos	2		
2026	Manly-Warringah Sea Eagles	1		
	Totals	60	3	12

*denotes season competing
