= Junior Pauga =

Samoa international rugby league footballer

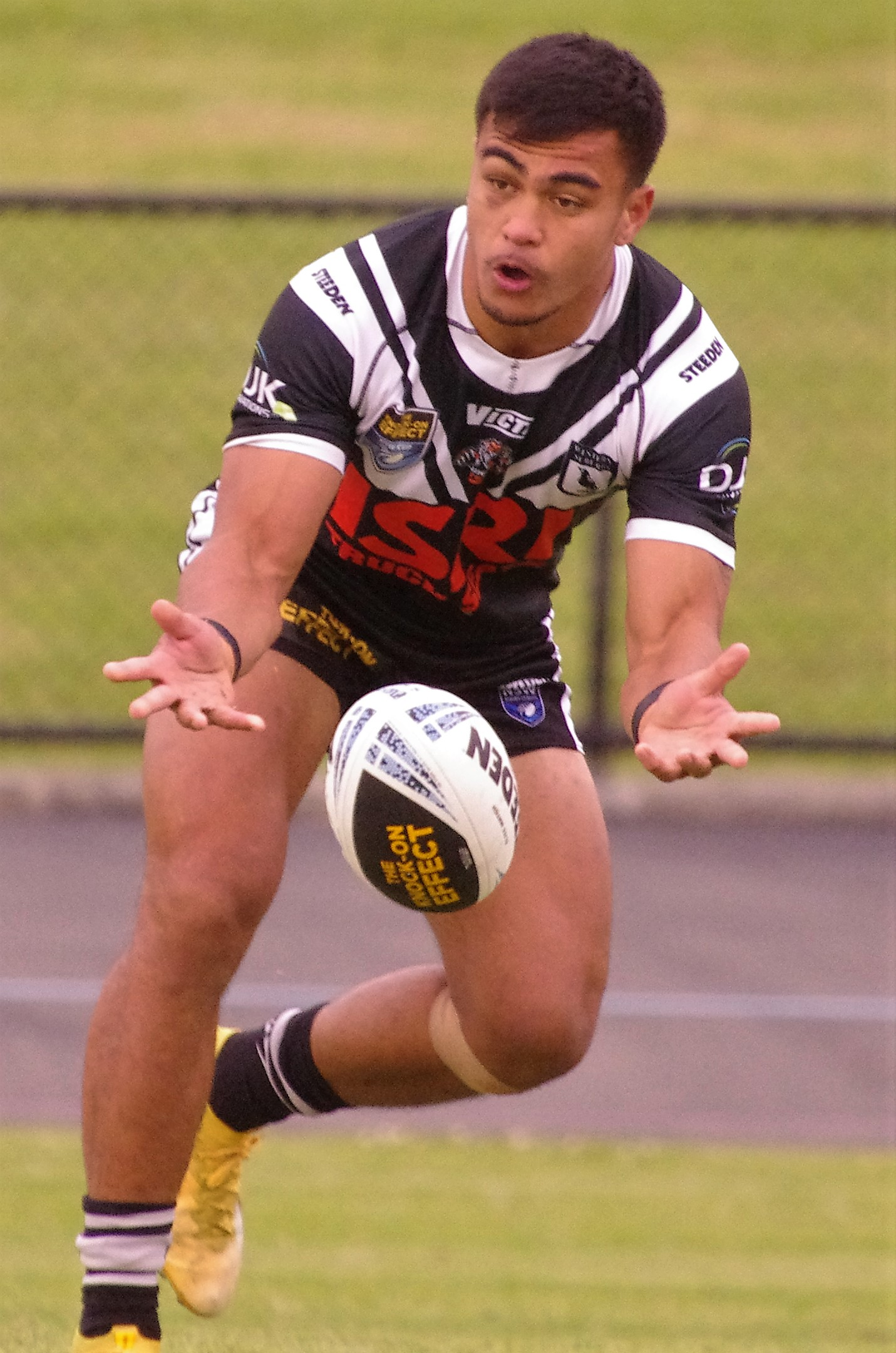

Personal information
- Full name: Fetalaiga Junior Pauga
- Born: 3 February 1996 (age 30) Ōtāhuhu, New Zealand
- Height: 186 cm (6 ft 1 in)
- Weight: 93 kg (14 st 9 lb)

Playing information
- Position: Wing, Centre
Club
Years	Team	Pld	T	G	FG	P
2021–22	Wests Tigers	4	1	0	0	4
2023–26	Sydney Roosters	22	10	0	0	40
2027–	Hull FC	0	0	0	0	0
	Total	26	11	0	0	44
Representative
Years	Team	Pld	T	G	FG	P
2024	Samoa	2	0	5	0	10
- Source: As of 24 October 2026

Fetalaiga Junior Pauga (born 3 February 1996) is a Samoa international rugby league footballer who plays for Hull FC in the Super League as a winger.

He previously played for the Wests Tigers in the National Rugby League (NRL) as a centre.

== Background ==
Born in Ōtāhuhu, Auckland, New Zealand, Pauga was a student at Kelston Boys' High School. In 2014, he was named MVP of the national secondary school tournament and chosen in the NZ Secondary Schools team to play New South Wales.

== Career ==
=== 2016–2020 ===
Between 2016 and 2018, Pauga was a member of the New Zealand Warriors NSW Cup team. From 2019, he joined the Wynnum Manly Seagulls in the Queensland Cup. In his first season, he played 13 games for 10 wins, 3 tries, 9 goals. and was a member of the team that lost to the Burleigh Bears in the grand final.

In 2020, Pauga made one appearance in Wynnum's first grade before the competition was cancelled because of the COVID-19 pandemic. One of a handful of players who chose to join the lower-grade team when that competition restarted, Pauga scored a try and kicked 6 goals as Wynnum won the reserve grade grand final. He said, "When COVID hit, we got told that Cup was off; and then I heard that BRL was coming back, so I was like... even though Cup was not on, I thought this would be a good opportunity for me to play footy and have fun with the boys. It was pretty good to be part of the team; I have some mates, we all came from New Zealand and the goal was for them to play Cup this year."

After playing the first four games with Wynnum in 2021, Pauga was released to join the Wests Tigers in the NRL.

=== 2021 ===
Pauga made his debut in round 18, for the Wests Tigers against the Brisbane Broncos, scoring a try in a 42-24 victory. Before the game, he said, "It’s been a tough journey over the past three years. After leaving the Warriors, I didn’t have anything and had to go to Queensland to start all over again. When this opportunity came up, I had no doubt in my mind that I was going to take it with both hands and I don’t ever want to take it for granted."

=== 2022 ===
In November 2022, Pauga signed for North Sydney ahead of the 2023 season.

=== 2023 ===
In round 14 of the 2023 NRL season, Pauga scored a try on his club debut for the Sydney Roosters in their 25-24 victory over Canterbury. Pauga played nine matches for the Sydney Roosters as the club finished 7th on the table and qualified for the finals. He played in both of the clubs finals games as they were eliminated in the second week against Melbourne. On 24 September, Pauga played for North Sydney in their 2023 NSW Cup grand final loss against South Sydney.

=== 2024 ===
In round 11 of the 2024 NRL season, Pauga scored two tries for the Sydney Roosters in their 38-30 loss against Cronulla. In round 16, Pauga was sent off for a high tackle during the Sydney Roosters victory over Canterbury. Pauga was later suspended for four games. In round 27, Pauga scored a hat-trick for the Sydney Roosters in their 36-28 victory over arch-rivals South Sydney.

=== 2026 ===
On 2 September 2026 it was reported that he had signed for Hull FC in the Super League on a 2-year deal.
