= Sandon Smith =

Australian rugby league footballer

Personal information
- Born: 6 December 2002 (age 23) Gosford, New South Wales, Australia
- Height: 176 cm (5 ft 9 in)
- Weight: 82 kg (12 st 13 lb)

Playing information
- Position: Five-eighth, Halfback
Club
Years	Team	Pld	T	G	FG	P
2023–25	Sydney Roosters	46	6	64	0	152
2026–	Newcastle Knights	25	3	61	0	134
	Total	71	9	125	0	286
- Source: As of 4 October 2026

Sandon Smith (born 6 December 2002) is an Australian professional rugby league footballer who plays as a five-eighth for the Newcastle Knights in the National Rugby League.

== Playing career ==
Smith progressed through the Roosters Central Coast pathways system playing for the Kincumber Colts, earning the club's Rising Star award in 2018. In 2021, Smith played SG Ball for the Roosters, earning SG Ball player of the year honours.

Smith progressed to NSW Cup leading the comp in try and line-break assists. In Round 14 2023, Smith made his NRL debut for Sydney against the Canterbury-Bankstown Bulldogs at Central Coast Stadium, coming off the bench in 25–24 win.

=== 2023 ===
Smith played 15 matches for the Sydney Roosters in the 2023 NRL season as the club finished 7th on the table and qualified for the finals. Smith played in both of the clubs finals games as they were eliminated in the second week against Melbourne.

=== 2024 ===
Smith played 15 games for the Sydney Roosters in the 2024 NRL season as they reached the preliminary final before being defeated by Melbourne.

=== 2025 ===
In round 8 of the 2025 NRL season, Smith scored two tries for the Sydney Roosters in their 46-18 victory over St. George Illawarra. On 13 August 2025, it was reported that Smith had been given permission to negotiate with rival clubs ahead of the 2026 NRL season. Smith played 17 games for the Sydney Roosters in the 2025 NRL season as the club finished 8th on the table and qualified for the finals.

As of 27 October 2025, Sandon signed with the Newcastle Knights agreeing to a four-year term.

=== 2026 ===
Smith played 25 games for Newcastle in the 2026 NRL season including their 2026 NRL Grand Final loss to the Sydney Roosters.

== Statistics ==
Year	Team	Games	Tries	Goals	Pts
2023	Sydney Roosters	15		7	14
2024	Sydney Roosters	15	1	1	6
2025	Sydney Roosters	17	5	56	132
2026	Newcastle Knights	25	3	61	134
	Totals	71	9	125	286

== Controversy ==
On 17 October, Smith had been charged over a car crash that happened back in March 2024. Smith was charged with negligent driving causing serious bodily harm and failing to give way. On 13 December 2024, Smith was later given a two-year conditional release order from the accident that left a man needing amputation of two of his toes, it is said during the hearing that Smith had apologised to the man multiple times over the months from the accident. Smith's lawyer described to the court that Smith had been involved in an "unfortunate chain of events".
