= Billy Smith (rugby league, born 1999) =

Australian rugby league footballer

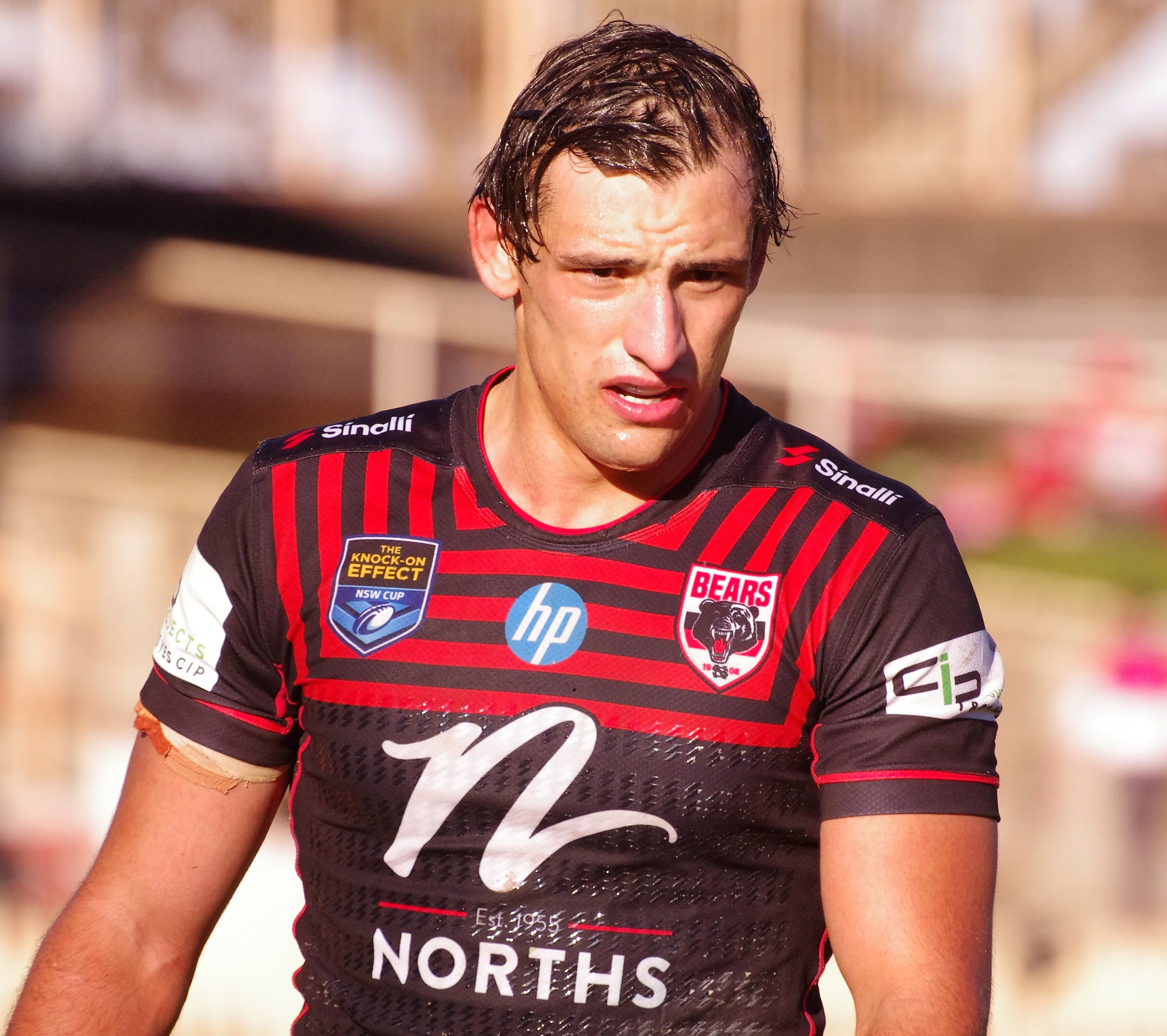

Personal information
- Full name: William Smith
- Born: 7 November 1999 (age 27) Sydney, New South Wales, Australia
- Height: 191 cm (6 ft 3 in)
- Weight: 99 kg (15 st 8 lb)

Playing information
- Position: Centre, Wing
Club
Years	Team	Pld	T	G	FG	P
2019–	Sydney Roosters	63	29	1	0	118
- Source: As of 4 October 2026

Billy Smith (born 7 November 1999) is a professional rugby league footballer who plays as a centre for the Sydney Roosters in the National Rugby League (NRL).

== Background ==
Smith was born in Sydney, New South Wales, Australia.

== Playing career ==
Prior to his league career, Smith attended high school at The Scots College where he played for the school's 1st XV in rugby union.

=== 2018 ===
Smith played for the Wyong Roos during the 2018 Intrust Super Premiership NSW season. After Wyong exited the competition, Smith played for North Sydney in the first half of the 2019 Canterbury Cup NSW season scoring nine tries in six games before receiving a call up to the Sydney Roosters first grade side.

=== 2019 ===
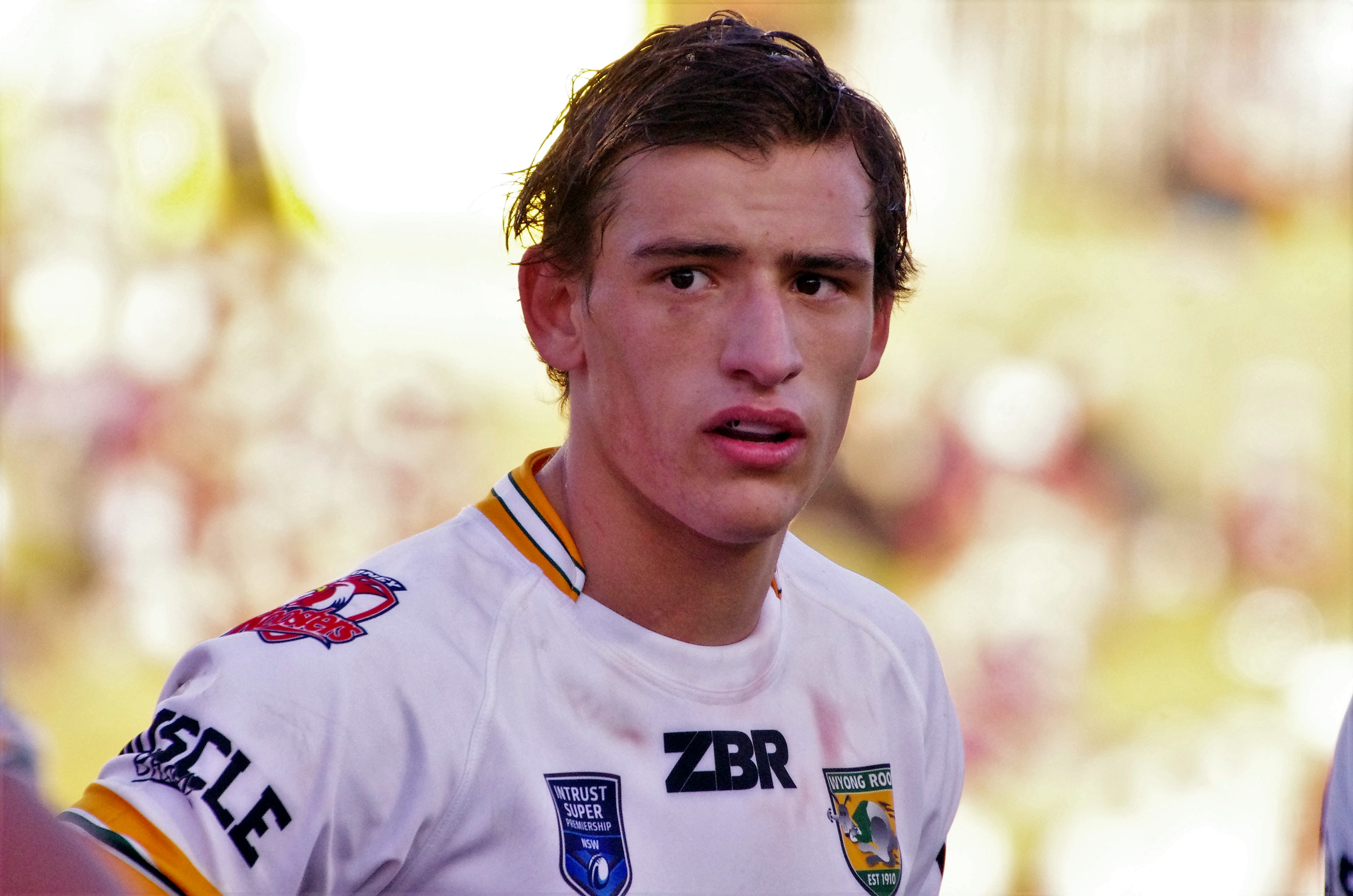
Smith playing for the Wyong Roos in 2019

In round 23 of the 2019 NRL season, Smith made his NRL debut for the Roosters against the St. George Illawarra Dragons scoring a try in a 34-12 victory at Kogarah Oval.

=== 2020 ===
During pre-season training for the 2020 NRL season, Smith suffered an anterior cruciate ligament (ACL) knee injury during a contact session. Sydney Roosters head coach Trent Robinson confirmed the injury saying “It’s Billy’s other knee and it’s an ACL, One of the doctors was telling me a stat where once you suffer one ACL injury you’re then a 25 per cent chance of doing the other knee inside two years if you’re under 21. We’re all feeling for Billy, there was a big opportunity there for him but the type of person he is he’ll fight back from this". Smith was widely tipped to start the year at left centre after the departure of Latrell Mitchell. Smith reported to the NRL integrity unit regarding knowledge about the infamous Sam Burgess sexting scandal.

=== 2021 ===
On 17 February 2021, Smith was ruled out for four months with a shoulder injury which he suffered at training.

In round 17 of the 2021 NRL season, Smith made his long awaited return and scored a try during the Sydney Roosters 22-16 victory over Canterbury-Bankstown. On 27 July, it was revealed that Smith would be ruled out for the rest of the 2021 NRL season after suffering a lisfranc foot injury.

=== 2022 ===
In round 18 of the 2022 NRL season, Smith was taken from the field during the Sydney Roosters 54-26 victory over St. George Illawarra with a knee injury. Smith was later ruled out for the rest of the 2022 NRL season with an ACL injury.

=== 2023 ===
In round 10 of the 2023 NRL season, Smith played his first NRL game in almost one year for the Sydney Roosters in their shock loss to North Queensland. In the 2023 elimination final against Cronulla, Smith fractured his jaw during the match and was later ruled out for an indefinite period. The Sydney Roosters would go on to record a 13-12 upset victory.

=== 2024 & 2025 ===
Smith made no appearances for the Sydney Roosters in the 2024 NRL season. In round 6 of the 2025 NRL season, Smith scored two tries for the club in their 26-16 upset victory over Brisbane. In round 16, Smith scored two tries for the Sydney Roosters in their 42-8 victory over North Queensland. Smith played 18 games for the Sydney Roosters in the 2025 NRL season as the club finished 8th on the table and qualified for the finals. Smith played in the clubs elimination final loss against Cronulla.

=== 2026 ===
Smith played 18 games for the Sydney Roosters in the 2026 NRL season including the clubs 2026 NRL Grand Final victory over Newcastle.

== Statistics ==
Year	Team	Games	Tries	Goals	Pts
2019	Sydney Roosters	2	2		8
2021	Sydney Roosters	3	2		8
2022	Sydney Roosters	7			
2023	Sydney Roosters	15	4	1	18
2025	Sydney Roosters	18	8		32
2026	Sydney Roosters	17	12		48
	Totals	63	29	1	118
