= Haze Dunster =

New Zealand rugby league footballer

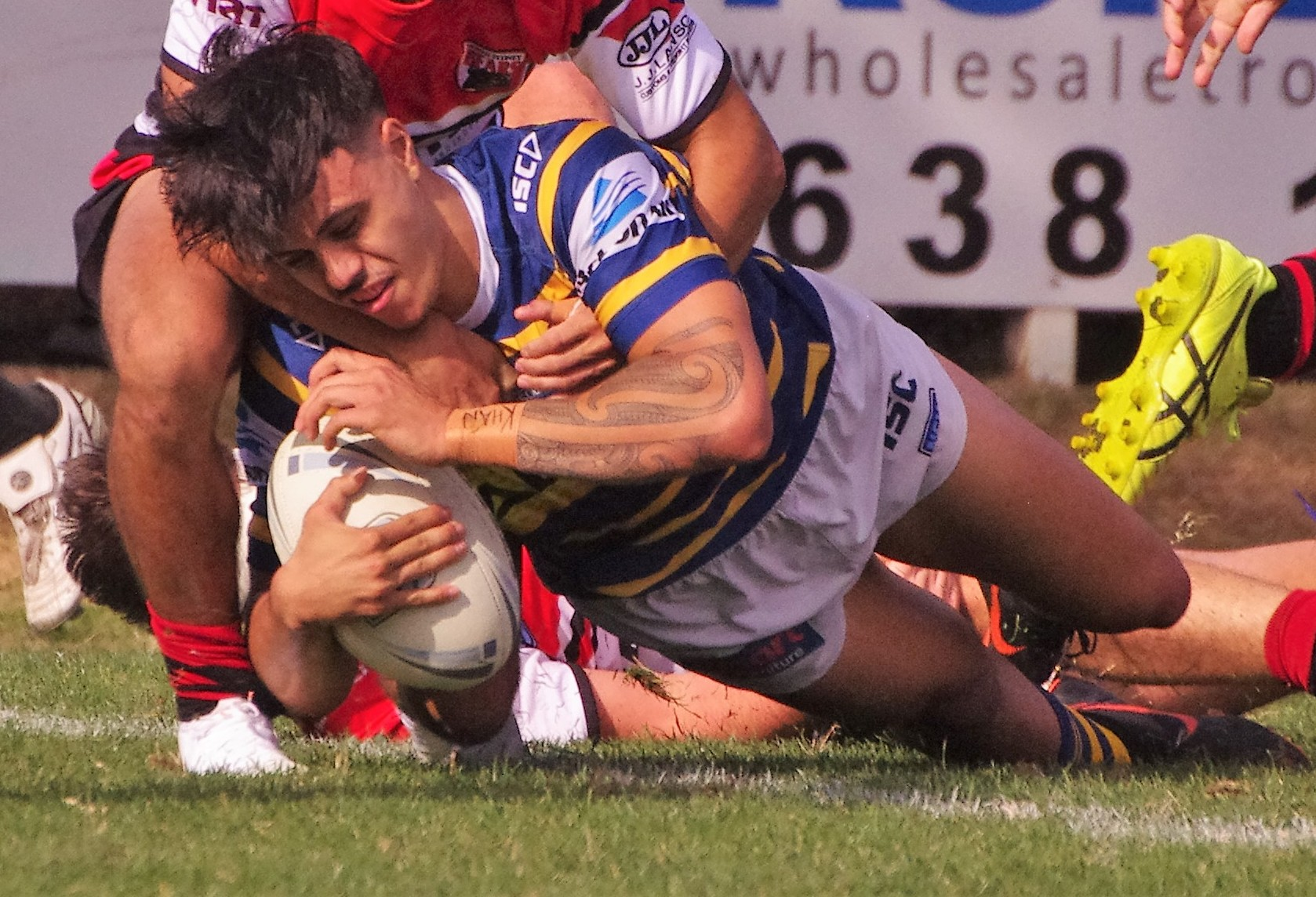

Personal information
- Born: 1 March 1999 (age 27) Rotorua, Bay of Plenty, New Zealand
- Height: 187 cm (6 ft 2 in)
- Weight: 90 kg (14 st 2 lb)

Playing information
- Position: Wing
Club
| Years | Team | Pld | T | G | FG | P |
|---|---|---|---|---|---|---|
| 2020–23 | Parramatta Eels | 19 | 3 | 0 | 0 | 12 |
- Source: As of 8 September 2025

Haze Dunster (born 1 March 1999) is a professional rugby league footballer who most recently played as a winger for the Parramatta Eels in the National Rugby League.

== Playing career ==
Dunster graduated from Parramatta's Jersey Flegg team in the Intrust Super Premiership with the Wentworthville Magpies. In 2019, Dunster re-signed with Parramatta until the end of the 2020 season. Dunster appeared in the 2019 Intrust Super Premiership grand final loss, against Newtown.

=== 2020 ===
Dunster began the year in the Eels 30 man squad, appearing as 18th man twice. Dunster made his NRL debut in week two of the finals of the 2020 NRL season for Parramatta against South Sydney, in a 38–24 loss at Bankwest Stadium, after being called into the team to play on gameday after Michael Jennings tested positive to drugs.

=== 2021 ===
In round 13 of the 2021 NRL season, Dunster scored his first try in the top grade as Parramatta defeated Newcastle 40–4. Dunster finished the 2021 NRL season with 13 appearances scoring three tries. He played in both finals matches against Newcastle and Penrith as the club bowed out of the finals at the second week for the third consecutive season. In September, he was named Parramatta's Rookie of the year. In December, Dunster signed a new deal with Parramatta to remain at the club until the end of the 2025 season.

=== 2022 ===
On 20 February, Dunster's 2022 NRL season was ended in Parramatta's first trial match of the year against St. George Illawarra. Dunster was on the receiving end of a hip-drop tackle from opponent Tyrell Fuimaono which tore his ACL, PCL and MCL, thus ruling him out for the entire year.

=== 2023 ===
In round 6 of the 2023 NRL season, Dunster made his long-awaited return to the Parramatta side in their 28–22 victory over the hapless Wests Tigers. Following Parramatta's round 11 loss against Canberra, Dunster was demoted to reserve grade in favour of Sean Russell. Dunster was limited to only five matches for Parramatta in the 2023 NRL season as the club finished 10th on the table. Dunster would instead spend most of the year with the clubs NSW Cup team.

=== 2024 ===
Dunster started the year in Parramatta's reserve grade team after falling down the pecking order behind the likes of Sean Russell, Morgan Harper and Maika Sivo. On 4 April, it was announced that Dunster would miss at least three months with a foot injury.

=== 2025 ===
On 2 September, it was announced that Dunster had suffered another ACL injury whilst playing for Parramatta in the NSW Cup and would require surgery ruling him out for an indefinite period. Dunster made no appearances for Parramatta's first grade team in the 2025 NRL season. In early September, it was announced that Dunster would be departing Parramatta after not being offered a new contract.
