= Egan Butcher =

Australian rugby league footballer

Egan Ray Butcher
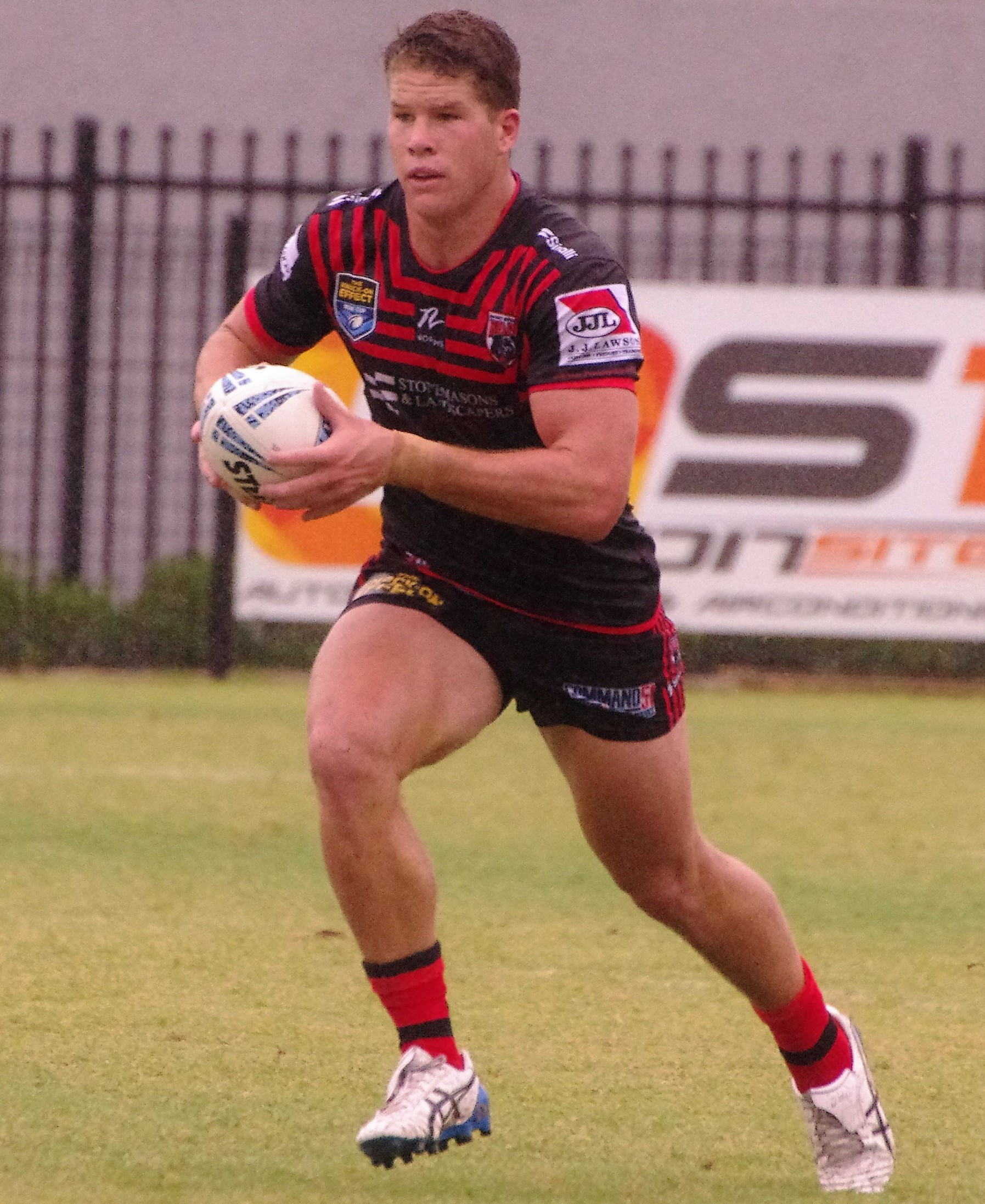

Personal information
- Full name: Egan Butcher
- Born: 5 August 2000 (age 26) Sydney, New South Wales, Australia
- Height: 187 cm (6 ft 2 in)
- Weight: 96 kg (15 st 2 lb)

Playing information
- Position: Second-row, Lock
Club
Years	Team	Pld	T	G	FG	P
2021–	Sydney Roosters	90	9	0	0	36
- Source: As of 13 September 2026
- Relatives: Nat Butcher (brother)

Eganell Ray Butcher (born 5 August 2000) is a professional rugby league footballer who plays as a second-rower or prop for the Sydney Roosters in the National Rugby League (NRL).

== Background ==
Egan Butcher played his junior rugby league for South Eastern Seagulls in the South Sydney District Junior Rugby Football League competition. Younger sibling of Nat Butcher he also grew up playing rugby union and eventually followed his brother to the Roosters and was a star performer in the S.G. Ball and Jersey Flegg competitions in 2018. Egan Butcher has spent his last few pre-seasons with the Roosters impressing his coaches and peers.

== Playing career ==
=== 2021 ===
Butcher began the 2021 season playing for North Sydney in the NSW Cup. In round 12 of the 2021 NRL season, Butcher made his first grade debut for the Sydney Roosters against Canberra. Butcher played a total of 15 games for the Sydney Roosters in the 2021 NRL season including the club's two finals matches. The Sydney Roosters would be eliminated from the second week of the finals losing to Manly 42–6.

=== 2022 ===
Butcher made 12 appearances for the Sydney Roosters in the 2022 NRL season as the club finished sixth on the table. Butcher played in the Sydney Roosters elimination final loss to arch-rivals South Sydney which ended their season.

=== 2023 ===
Butcher played 21 games for the Sydney Roosters in the 2023 NRL season including both of the clubs finals matches which saw them eliminated in the second week against Melbourne.

=== 2024 ===
In round 5 of the 2024 NRL season, Butcher scored two tries for the Sydney Roosters in their 30-26 loss against Canterbury. Butcher would be ruled out for the rest of the season after he tore his ACL during the Roosters round 12 win against the Canberra Raiders.

=== 2025 & 2026 ===
On 31 January the Sydney Roosters announced that Butcher had re-signed with the club until the end of 2027. Butcher played 17 games for the Sydney Roosters in the 2025 NRL season as the club finished 8th on the table and qualified for the finals. Butcher played in the clubs elimination final loss against Cronulla. Butcher played 17 games for the Sydney Roosters in the 2026 NRL season as the club won the premiership defeating Newcastle in the grand final. Butcher did not feature in the final for the club.

== Statistics ==
Year	Team	Games	Tries	Pts
2021	Sydney Roosters	15	1	4
2022	Sydney Roosters	12	2	8
2023	Sydney Roosters	21	2	8
2024	Sydney Roosters	8	2	8
2025	Sydney Roosters	17	1	4
2026	Sydney Roosters	17	1	4
	Totals	90	9	36
