= Jaxson Paulo =

Samoa international rugby league footballer

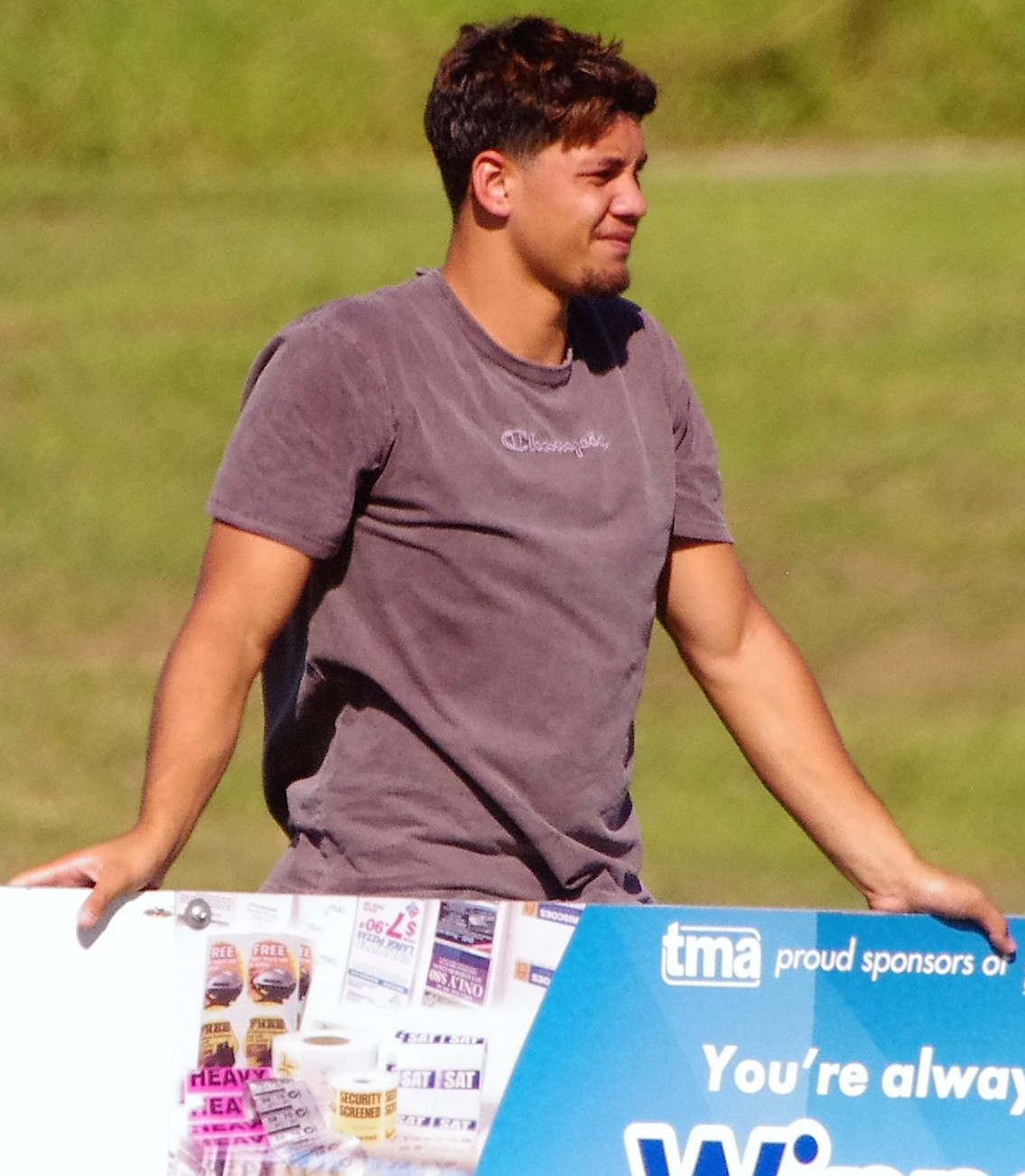

Personal information
- Born: 3 October 1999 (age 27) Takapuna, North Shore, New Zealand
- Height: 192 cm (6 ft 4 in)
- Weight: 101 kg (15 st 13 lb)

Playing information
- Position: Wing, Centre
Club
Years	Team	Pld	T	G	FG	P
2020–22	South Sydney	43	19	0	0	76
2023	Sydney Roosters	12	6	0	0	24
2024	Manly Sea Eagles	8	2	0	0	8
2025–26	Nth Qld Cowboys	3	2	0	0	8
	Total	66	29	0	0	116
Representative
Years	Team	Pld	T	G	FG	P
2022	Samoa	1	1	0	0	4
- Source: As of 17 July 2025

Jaxson Paulo (born 3 October 1999) is a Samoa international rugby league footballer from New Zealand who plays as a winger for the North Queensland Cowboys in the National Rugby League (NRL).

== Background ==
Paulo was born in Auckland, New Zealand, and is of Samoan and Maori descent. He played his junior rugby league for the Nerang Roosters and came through the Gold Coast Titans system.

== Early career ==
=== 2020 ===
Paulo made his debut in round 10 of the 2020 NRL season for South Sydney against the Newcastle Knights. He provided a try assist in the second half as Souths lost the match 20-18 at Western Sydney Stadium.

In round 16 against Parramatta, Paulo scored his first try in the top grade as Souths won the match 38-0 at Bankwest Stadium.

In round 19 against Canterbury-Bankstown, Paulo scored a first half try in South Sydney's upset defeat at ANZ Stadium. Following Paulo's try, video footage showed the players foot touching the sideline constituting a no try but match officials were not consulted and the on-field decision of try was given.

In the elimination finals game against Parramatta, he scored two tries as Souths came from 18-8 down at half-time to win 38-24 at Bankwest Stadium.

The following week, he played in the club's preliminary final defeat against Penrith at ANZ Stadium.

=== 2021 ===
In round 8 of the 2021 NRL season against Canberra, Paulo fractured his scaphoid in South Sydney's victory. He was later ruled out for six to eight weeks.

In round 21, he scored two tries for South Sydney in a 40-12 victory over Parramatta.

In round 24, Paulo scored two tries for South Sydney in a 54-12 victory over arch-rivals the Sydney Roosters.

In the 2021 Finals Series, Paulo scored two tries for South Sydney in their 36-16 preliminary final victory over Manly. It was only the second time that Souths had qualified for a grand final since their 1971 triumph.

Paulo played a total of 12 games for South Sydney in the 2021 NRL season including the club's 2021 NRL Grand Final defeat against Penrith.

=== 2022 ===
Following South Sydney's narrow loss to Penrith in round 23 of the 2022 NRL season, Paulo was subjected to online death threats. Paulo received the death threats in direct messages to his social media account following an error-ridden performance. On 26 August, Paulo signed a two-year deal to join arch-rivals the Sydney Roosters.

=== 2023 ===
In round 2 of the 2023 NRL season, Paulo scored two tries for the Sydney Roosters in a 20-12 victory over the New Zealand Warriors. The following week, Paulo scored a further two tries as the Sydney Roosters defeated his former club and arch-rivals South Sydney 20-18. On 26 June, it was announced that Paulo had signed a three-year deal to join Manly starting in 2024.

=== 2024 ===
Paulo only played eight matches for Manly in the 2024 NRL season as they finished 7th on the table and qualified for the finals.

On 12 November, Paulo signed a two-year deal with the North Queensland Cowboys starting in 2025.

=== 2025 & 2026 ===
Paulo played three games for North Queensland in the 2025 NRL season. In the 2026 NRL season, Paulo made no appearances for the club. He would instead play for the Northern Pride in the Queensland Cup.

== Statistics ==
Year	Team	Games	Tries	Pts
2020	South Sydney Rabbitohs	13	4	16
2021	South Sydney Rabbitohs	12	9	36
2022	South Sydney Rabbitohs	18	6	24
2023	Sydney Roosters	12	6	24
2024	Manly Warringah Sea Eagles	8	2	8
2025	North Queensland Cowboys	3	2	8
2026	North Queensland Cowboys			
	Totals	66	29	116
