= Nat Butcher =

Australian rugby league footballer

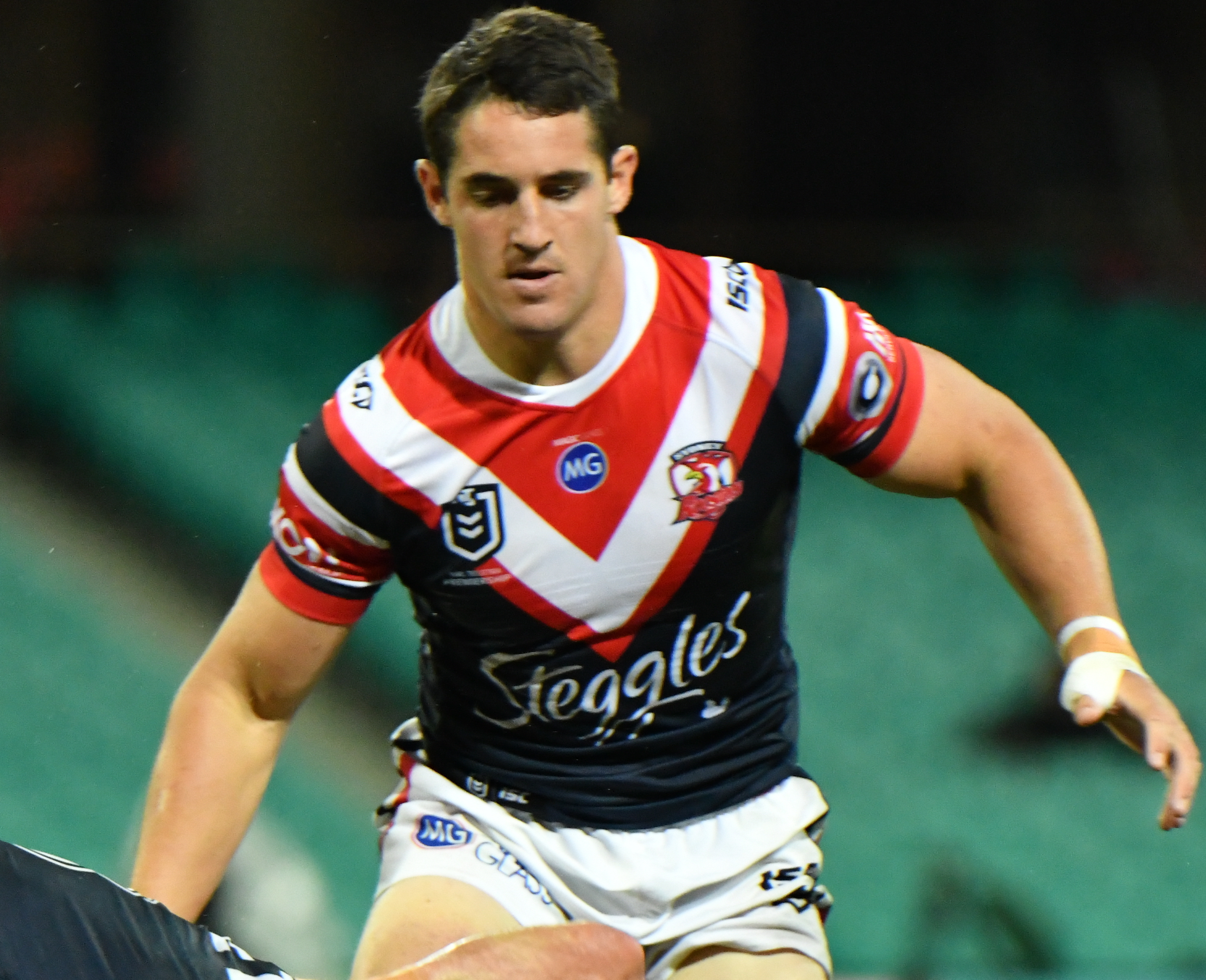

Personal information
- Full name: Nathaniel Butcher
- Born: 25 July 1997 (age 29) Sydney, New South Wales, Australia
- Height: 184 cm (6 ft 0 in)
- Weight: 97 kg (15 st 4 lb)

Playing information
- Position: Second-row, Lock
Club
Years	Team	Pld	T	G	FG	P
2016–	Sydney Roosters	179	27	0	0	108
Representative
Years	Team	Pld	T	G	FG	P
2022	Prime Minister's XIII	1	1	0	0	4
- Source: As of 4 October 2026
- Relatives: Egan Butcher (brother)

Nathaniel Zane Butcher (born 25 July 1997) is an Australian professional rugby league footballer who plays as a second-rower and lock for the Sydney Roosters in the National Rugby League (NRL). He won NRL premierships with the Roosters in 2019 and 2026.

== Background ==
Butcher was born in Sydney, New South Wales, Australia. He is the son of former Rabbitohs' player Blake Butcher.

Butcher played his junior rugby league for the South Eastern Seagulls, before being signed by the South Sydney Rabbitohs. He also dabbled briefly in rugby union.

== Playing career ==
=== Early career ===
In November and December 2014, Butcher played for the Australian Schoolboys. After playing in the lower grades at the South Sydney Rabbitohs, he joined the Sydney Roosters in 2015. In 2015 and 2016, he played for the Roosters' NYC team.

=== 2016 ===
In round 26 of the 2016 NRL season, Butcher made his NRL debut for the Roosters against the Brisbane Broncos. In September, he was named at lock in the 2016 NYC Team of the Year. In October, he captained the Roosters' NYC team to a premiership win, defeating the Penrith Panthers 30–28 at ANZ Stadium.

=== 2017 ===
Butcher made 2 appearances for the Roosters in 2017 but did not feature for the club in their finals campaign.

=== 2018 ===
Butcher made 13 appearances for Sydney in 2018 but made no appearances for the club in the finals and did not play in Easts 21–6 grand final victory over Melbourne.

=== 2019 ===
Butcher made a total of 23 appearances, playing from the bench in the club's 2019 NRL Grand Final victory over Canberra at ANZ Stadium.

On 7 October 2019, Butcher was named on the bench for the U23 Junior Australian side.

=== 2020 ===
Butcher played 19 games for the Roosters in the 2020 NRL season as the club reached the finals but were eliminated in the second week by Canberra ending their attempt of a third straight premiership.

=== 2021 ===
Butcher played a total of 19 games for Sydney in the 2021 NRL season including the club's semi-final in week two. The Roosters would be eliminated from the second week of the finals losing to Manly 42–6.

=== 2022 ===
In round 2 of the 2022 NRL season, Butcher scored two tries for the Sydney Roosters in a 26–12 victory over Manly. In round 21, Butcher scored two tries in an upset victory over Brisbane. In round 23, Butcher scored four tries for the Sydney Roosters in a record 72–6 victory over West Tigers. This was the first time Butcher had scored four tries in a single game in his NRL career. It was also the first time since 1951 that a forward had scored four tries in a game at the club.

=== 2023 ===
Butcher played 24 matches for the Sydney Roosters in the 2023 NRL season as the club finished 7th on the table and qualified for the finals. Butcher played in both of the clubs finals games as they were eliminated in the second week against Melbourne.

=== 2024 ===
In round 8 of the 2024 NRL season, Butcher scored two tries for the Sydney Roosters in their 60-18 victory over St. George Illawarra in the traditional ANZAC Day game. Butcher played 23 matches for the Sydney Roosters throughout the 2024 NRL season as the club finished third and qualified for the finals.

=== 2025 ===
Butcher would play four games in the 2025 season and would be ruled out for the rest of the year after three consecutive MCL injuries that required a reconstructive operation.

=== 2026 ===
Butcher played 26 matches for the Sydney Roosters in the 2026 NRL season including the clubs 2026 NRL Grand Final victory over Newcastle.

== Statistics ==
Year	Team	Games	Tries	Pts
2016	Sydney Roosters	1		
2017	Sydney Roosters	2		
2018	Sydney Roosters	13		
2019	Sydney Roosters	23	3	12
2020	Sydney Roosters	19	1	4
2021	Sydney Roosters	19	2	8
2022	Sydney Roosters	25	11	44
2023	Sydney Roosters	24	4	16
2024	Sydney Roosters	23	4	16
2025	Sydney Roosters	4		
2026	Sydney Roosters	25	1	4
2027	Sydney Roosters			
	Totals	178	27	108

*denotes season competing
