= 2026 Manly Warringah Sea Eagles season =

Australian rugby league team season

- NRL rank: 9th
- Play-off result: DNQ
- 2026 record: Wins: 11; draws: 0; losses: 13

Team information
- CEO: (Australia) Jason King
- Coach: (Australia) Anthony Seibold --> (New Zealand) Kieran Foran (Interim --> Permanent)
- Captain: (Australia) Tom Trbojevic & (Australia) Jake Trbojevic (from Round 15)
- Stadium: Brookvale Oval (4 Pines Park) (18,000)
- Avg. attendance: 15,800
- High attendance: 17,329 (Round 8 vs PAR)
- Low attendance: 11,108 (Round 11 vs DOL)

Top scorers
- Tries: (Tonga) Lehi Hopoate (18)
- Points: (Australia) Jamal Fogarty (149)
← 2025	2027 →

The 2026 Manly Warringah Sea Eagles season was the 77th in the club's history since their entry to the New South Wales Rugby League premiership in 1947. The club celebrated its 80th season recognising the three seasons they played with the North Sydney Bears as the Northern Eagles. Anthony Seibold coached the club for the fourth consecutive year for the first three rounds. Tom Trbojevic took over as captain of the club, taking over from Daly Cherry-Evans following his departure to the Sydney Roosters. Former Manly forward Jason King took over the role of CEO after Tony Mestrov departed the club.Mestrov left after a difficult 2025 season which included negotiations with high-profile players that either failed or faced significant challenges which included the now former captain and halfback Cherry-Evans and fullback Tom Trbojevic. Seibold was sacked on the 27 March 2026, after the team failed to win the first three games of the season at home. In his full three seasons at the club he only took the club to the finals in 2024 with the side finishing in 12th place and 10th place in 2023 and 2025 respectively.

The newly appointed assistant coach and former Manly player and premiership winner, Kieran Foran took over as the interim coach on the 28 March2026. Foran became the permanent head coach of the side on the 2 June 2026, after winning seven of his first nine matches. Once Foran took over as coach fans attributed the change in results to 'Fozball' which has now become a popular way to describe Foran's coaching and the teams playing style. On the week he was appointed coach, 4 Pines Brewing Company decided to rename '4 Pines Park' (the sponsored name for Brookvale Oval) as 'Foz Pines Park' and a local KFC at Manly Vale temporarily replaced Colonel Sanders head with Foran's head. Foran promoted Jake Trbojevic to co-captain with brother Tom Trbojevic after successfully captaining whilst Tom Trbojevic was injured. After a great start to Manly's premiership campaign under Foran, Manly encountered an unexpected slump of 6 straight losses, resulting in the team fumbling out of the top eight to finish the season in 9th place, just shy of a return to the finals for the first time since 2024.

== 2026 squad ==
Manly Warringah Sea Eagles 2026 squad
Top 30 squad – 2026 NRL season			Supplementary list	Coaching staff
Luke Brooks – FE; Nathan Brown – PR; Paul Bryan – PR; Ethan Bullemor – PR; Zach Dockar-Clay – HK; Clayton Faulalo – FB, CE, WG; Jamal Fogarty – HB (gk); Reuben Garrick – CE (gk); Kobe Hetherington – PR; Lehi Hopoate – WG, FB	Tolutau Koula – CE, FB, WG; Simione Laiafi – PR; Onitoni Large – FE; Zaidas Muagututia – HK; Caleb Navale – LK; Haumole Olakau'atu (vc) – SR; Taniela Paseka – PR; Jason Saab – WG; Aaron Schoupp – SR; Jake Simpkin – HK	Sio Siua Taukeiaho – PR; Ben Trbojevic – SR; Jake Trbojevic (c) – LK; Tom Trbojevic (c) – FB; Corey Waddell – SR; Joey Walsh – FE, HB; Navren Willett – WG; Blake Wilson – WG	Josh Feledy – CE; Hugo Hart – SR; Mia Pua'avase – LK; Jackson Shereb – SR; Brandon Wakeham – HK; Extended squad: Fletcher Baker – SR; Nic Lenaz – HK	Manager: Peter Gentle (Head of Football & Recruitment); Head coach: Kieran Foran; Assistant coaches: Jim Dymock (Defence Coach); Brett Kimmorley (NSW Cup Coach); Jarrod Croker (Goal Kicking Coach); Jon Clarke (Head of Performance); Aaron Greaves (Coaching Development & Leadership Manager); Paul Devlin (High Performance Consultant); Albert Chang (Strength & Power Coach); Legend: (c) Captain(s); (vc) Vice-captain(s); Updated: 10 October 2026; Source(s): Sea Eagles team profiles, Sea Eagles 2024

== Transfers ==
Gains
Player	Club	Until	Source
Paul Bryan (Gained mid-2025)	Newcastle Knights	2026	
Zach Dockar-Clay	Sydney Roosters	2026	
Jamal Fogarty	Canberra Raiders	2028	
Kobe Hetherington	Brisbane Broncos	2029	
Blake Wilson	Canterbury-Bankstown Bulldogs	2027	

Losses
Player	Club	Until	Source
Josh Aloiai	Retired		
Gordon Chan Kum Tong	Canterbury-Bankstown Bulldogs	2027	
Michael Chee-Kam	Retired		
Daly Cherry-Evans	Sydney Roosters	2027	
Aitasi James	North Sydney Bears (NSW Cup)		
Dean Matterson	Racing Club Albi XIII (Super XIII)	2026	
Chris Patolo	Huddersfield Giants (Super League)	2027	
Toafofoa Sipley	Warrington Wolves (Super League)	2027	
Tommy Talau	Sydney Roosters	2026	
Jazz Tevaga	Wakefield Trinity (Super League)	2027	
Ray Vaega	North Sydney Bears (NSW Cup)	2026	

== Results ==
Pos	Team	Pld	W	D	L	B	PF	PA	PD	Pts	Qualification
1	Penrith Panthers	24	18	0	6	3	683	347	+336	42	Advance to finals series
2	New Zealand Warriors	24	18	0	6	3	728	418	+310	42	Advance to finals series
3	Dolphins	24	17	0	7	3	662	506	+156	40	Advance to finals series
4	Sydney Roosters (P)	24	16	0	8	3	619	501	+118	38	Advance to finals series
5	Cronulla-Sutherland Sharks	24	14	0	10	3	672	523	+149	34	Advance to finals series
6	South Sydney Rabbitohs	24	14	0	10	3	694	581	+113	34	Advance to finals series
7	Newcastle Knights	24	14	0	10	3	633	591	+42	34	Advance to finals series
8	North Queensland Cowboys	24	13	0	11	3	568	652	−84	32	Advance to finals series
9	Manly Warringah Sea Eagles	24	11	0	13	3	623	524	+99	28	
10	Melbourne Storm	24	11	0	13	3	594	576	+18	28	
11	Canberra Raiders	24	11	0	13	3	581	626	−45	28	
12	Canterbury-Bankstown Bulldogs	24	11	0	13	3	476	536	−60	28	
13	Parramatta Eels	24	9	0	15	3	497	678	−181	24	
14	Brisbane Broncos	24	8	0	16	3	471	677	−206	22	
15	Wests Tigers	24	8	0	16	3	445	699	−254	22	
16	Gold Coast Titans	24	6	0	18	3	477	663	−186	18	
17	St. George Illawarra Dragons	24	5	0	19	3	392	717	−325	16	

Source: National Rugby League
Rules for classification: 1) competition points; 2) points differential; 3) percentage; (Note: Greater percentage of points scored for and against, being determined by points scored for divided by points scored against expressed as a percentage.) 4) tries scored; (Note: Further tiebreakers (in order) include goals scored, field goals kicked; least amount of penalties conceded.)
(P) Premiers

=== Pre-Season Challenge ===
Date	Round	Opponent	Venue	Score	Tries	Goals	Field Goals	Referee	Attendance
7 Feb	1	Bye							
Sat 14 Feb 1:40pm (3:40pm NZDT)	2	New Zealand Warriors	McLean Park	33 - 18	H. Hart (2), P. Bryan, C. Faulalo, B. Wilson, Z. Muagututia	B. Wakeham (4/6)	J. Walsh (1/1)	Ashley Klein	13,575
Sun 22 Feb 4:00pm	3	South Sydney Rabbitohs	Glen Willow Oval	30 - 6	C. Faulalo	C. Faulalo		Todd Smith	5,742

=== Regular season ===
Date	Round	Opponent	Venue	Score	Tries	Goals	Field Goals	Referee	Attendance
Sat 7 Mar 7:30pm	1	Canberra Raiders	Brookvale Oval	29 - 28	T. Trbojevic, H. Olakau'atu, T. Koula, J. Fogarty	J. Fogarty (5/5), R. Garrick (1/1)		Liam Kennedy	17,253
Sun 15 Mar 4:05pm	2	Newcastle Knights	Brookvale Oval	16 - 36	J. Fogarty, T. Trbojevic, H. Olakau'atu,	J. Fogarty (2/3)		Todd Smith	17,107
19 - 22 Mar	3	Bye							
Thu 26 Mar 8:00pm	4	Sydney Roosters	Brookvale Oval	16 - 33	T. Trbojevic (2), T. Koula	J. Fogarty (2/3)		Wyatt Raymond	16,082
Thu 2 April 8:00pm	5	Dolphins	Kayo Stadium	52 - 18	L. Hopoate (2), T. Trbojevic, R. Garrick, L. Brooks, H. Olakau'atu, T. Koula, B. Trbojevic, C. Waddell	J. Fogarty (8/11)		Grant Atkins	10,023
Fri 10 April 6:00pm	6	St. George Illawarra Dragons	WIN Stadium	28 - 18	R. Garrick (2), T. Trbojevic, K. Hetherington, L. Hopoate	J. Fogarty		Adam Gee	11,381
Thu 16 April 7:50pm	7	North Queensland Cowboys	QLD Country Bank Stadium	6 - 38	L. Hopoate (2), B. Trbojevic, B. Wakeham, T. Paseka, L. Brooks	J. Fogarty (7/8)		Gerard Sutton	17,476
Sun 26 April 4:05pm	8	Parramatta Eels	Brookvale Oval	33 - 18	J. Trbojevic, L. Hopoate, R. Garrick, J. Fogarty, J. Saab, C. Faulalo	J. Fogarty (4/6)	J. Fogarty	Peter Gough	17,329
Sun 3 May 6:15pm	9	Penrith Panthers	Commbank Stadium	18 - 16	C. Faulalo, E. Bullemor, L. Hopoate	R. Garrick (2/3)		Wyatt Raymond	14,960
Sat 9 May 7:30pm	10	Brisbane Broncos	Brookvale Oval	32 - 4	J. Walsh, L. Hopoate, S. Taukeiaho, T. Koula, R. Garrick	R. Garrick (6/7)		Gerard Sutton	17,269
Sat 16 May 3:00pm	11	Wests Tigers	Suncorp Stadium	46 - 18	J. Saab (3), L. Hopoate, C. Faulalo, H. Olakau'atu, T. Paseka	R. Garrick (7/8)		Grant Atkins	49,602
Sat 23 May 7:30pm	12	Gold Coast Titans	Brookvale Oval	12 - 10	B. Wilson, C. Faulalo	R. Garrick (2/3)		Gerard Sutton	13,173
Fri 29 May 8:00pm	13	Cronulla-Sutherland Sharks	Ocean Protect Stadium	28 - 22	C. Faulalo, B. Trbojevic, J. Saab, J. Fogarty	R. Garrick(3/4)		Todd Smith	10,793
Thu 4 June 8:00pm	14	South Sydney Rabbitohs	Brookvale Oval	28 - 14	J. Saab (2), L. Hopoate, C. Faulalo, B.Trbojevic	R. Garrick (4/5)		Adam Gee	15,451
11 - 14 June	15	Bye							
Sat 20 June 7:30pm	16	Canterbury-Bankstown Bulldogs	Accor Stadium	13 - 12	L. Hopoate (2), R. Garrick	R. Garrick (0/1), J. Fogarty (0/2)		Adam Gee	18,243
Sat 27 June 7:30pm	17	Melbourne Storm	Brookvale Oval	30 - 4	H. Olakau'atu (2), J. Saab, T. Koula, B. Trbojevic	J. Fogarty (4/5)		Ashley Klein	17,211
Sun 5 July 2:00pm	18	Parramatta Eels	Commbank Stadium	23 - 14	L. Hopoate, J. Walsh	J. Fogarty (3/4)		Grant Atkins	18,778
Sun 12 July 4:05pm	19	North Queensland Cowboys	Brookvale Oval	18 - 19	J. Saab (2), L. Hopoate, H. Olakau'atu	J. Fogarty (1/4)		Peter Gough	16,892
Sun 19 July 2:00pm	20	Gold Coast Titans	Cbus Super Stadium	38 - 32	J. Saab (2), T. Trbojevic, H. Olakau'atu, R. Garrick, T. Koula	J. Fogarty (4/6)		Adam Gee	15,525
Sun 26 July 4:05pm	21	Cronulla-Sutherland Sharks	Brookvale Oval	12 - 48	T. Koula, J. Walsh	J. Fogarty (2/2)		Grant Atkins	17,126
30 July - 2 August	22	Bye							
Sat 8 August 3:00pm (1:00pm AWST)	23	Melbourne Storm	HBF Park	42 - 20	B. Wakeham, T. Koula, B. Wilson	J. Fogarty (4/4)		Keiren Irons	15,169
Fri 14 August 6:00pm	24	Dolphins	Brookvale Oval	0 - 22				Grant Atkins	11,108
Sat 22 August 3:00pm	25	Newcastle Knights	McDonald Jones Stadium	44 - 24	J. Feledy (3), C. Faulalo, C. Navale, R. Garrick, J. Saab, L. Hopoate	J. Fogarty (7/9)		Wyatt Raymond	24,537
Fri 28 August 6:00pm	26	St. George Illawarra Dragons	Brookvale Oval	44 - 10	L. Hopoate (2), J. Saab (2), R. Garrick, T. Trbojevic, J. Feledy, C. Faulalo, H. Olakau'atu	J. Fogarty (4/9)		Nick Pelgrave	13,597
Sat 5 September 3:00pm (5:00pm NZST)	27	New Zealand Warriors	Go Media Stadium	31 - 30	R. Garrick (2), L. Hopoate (2), J. Feledy	J. Fogarty (5/5)		Gerard Sutton	

== Representative Players ==
- Clayton Faulalo (Samoa)
- Josh Feledy (Papua New Guinea)
- Jamal Fogarty ( Indigenous All Stars, Australia Prime Minister's XIII)
- Lehi Hopoate (Tonga)
- Toluta'u Koula ( New South Wales, Tonga)
- Onitoni Large ( New South Wales Under 19s)
- Kylan Mafoa (Fiji)
- Caleb Navale (Fiji)
- Haumole Olakau'atu ( New South Wales, Tonga)
- Taniela Paseka (Tonga)
- Jason Saab (Lebanon)
- Tom Trbojevic (Australia)
- Brandon Wakeham (Fiji)
