= 2025 Manly Warringah Sea Eagles season =

- NRL rank: 10th
- Play-off result: DNQ
- 2025 record: Wins: 12; draws: 0; losses: 12

Team information
- CEO: (Australia) Tony Mestrov
- Coach: (Australia) Anthony Seibold
- Captain: (Australia) Daly Cherry-Evans
- Stadium: Brookvale Oval (4 Pines Park) (18,000)
- Avg. attendance: 16,393
- High attendance: 17,375 (Round 13 v BRI)
- Low attendance: 12,478 (Round 22 v SYD)

Top scorers
- Tries: (Tonga) Tolu Koula (17)
- Points: (Australia) Reuben Garrick (176)
← 2024	2026 →

The 2025 Manly Warringah Sea Eagles season was the 76th in the club's history since their entry to the New South Wales Rugby League premiership in 1947. Anthony Seibold coahed the club for the third consecutive year. Daly Cherry-Evans captained the club for the ninth consecutive and final year. Tolu Koula won the clubs Roy Bull Best and Fairest award for the season.

== 2025 squad ==
Manly Warringah Sea Eagles 2026 squad
Top 30 squad - 2026 NRL season			Supplementary list	Coaching staff
Luke Brooks – FE; Nathan Brown – PR; Paul Bryan – PR; Ethan Bullemor – PR; Zach Dockar-Clay – HB; Clayton Faulalo – WG, CE; Jamal Fogarty – HB (gk); Reuben Garrick – CE, WG (gk); Kobe Hetherington – LK; Lehi Hopoate – WG, FB	Tolutau Koula – CE, FB; Simione Laiafi – PR; Onitoni Large – FE; Zaidas Muagututia – HK; Caleb Navale – LK; Haumole Olakau'atu (vc) – SR; Taniela Paseka – PR; Jason Saab – WG; Aaron Schoupp – CE, SR; Jake Simpkin – HK	Ben Trbojevic – SR; Jake Trbojevic (vc) – LK, PR; Tom Trbojevic (c) – FB, CE; Corey Waddell – SR; Joey Walsh – HB; Navren Willett – WG; Blake Wilson – WG	Josh Feledy – CE; Mia Pua'avase – LK; Jackson Shereb – SR; Brandon Wakeham – HK	Manager: Peter Gentle (Head of Football & Recruitment); Head coach: Kieran Foran (Interim); Assistant coaches: Jim Dymock (Defence Coach); Brett Kimmorley (NSW Cup Coach); Jarrod Croker (Goal Kicking Coach); Jon Clarke (Head of Performance); Aaron Greaves (Coaching Development & Leadership Manager); Paul Devlin (High Performance Consultant); Albert Chang (Strength & Power Coach); Legend: (c) Captain(s); (vc) Vice-captain(s); Updated: 26 April 2026; Source(s): Sea Eagles Team Profiles, Sea Eagles 2024

== Transfers ==
Gains
Player	Club	Until	Source
Paul Bryan (Gained mid-season)	Newcastle Knights	2026	
Sio Siua Taukeiaho	Catalans Dragons (Super League)	2025	
Jazz Tevaga	New Zealand Warriors	2025	

Losses
Player	Club	Until	Source
Jake Arthur (Left mid-season)	Newcastle Knights	2025	
Bailey Hodgson (Left mid 2024)	Leigh Leopards (Super League)	2026	
Jamie Humphreys	South Sydney Rabbitohs	2026	
Karl Lawton	North Queensland Cowboys	2026	
Brad Parker	Retired		
Jaxson Paulo	North Queensland Cowboys	2026	
Josh Schuster (Left mid 2024)	South Sydney Rabbitohs (Initially released from the club mid-season)	2025	
Aaron Woods	Retired	2025	

== Results ==
=== Pre-season challenge ===
Date	Round	Opponent	Venue	Score	Tries	Goals	Field goals	Referee	Attendance
7 - 8 Feb	1	Bye							
Sat 15 Feb 3:30pm	2	South Sydney Rabbitohs	Central Coast Stadium	24 - 34	N. Willett (2), R. Vaega (2), A. Schoupp, J. Simpkin, C. Faulalo	C. Faulalo (3/7)		Peter Gough	5,679
Fri 21 Feb 6:00pm	2	Penrith Panthers	Leichhardt Oval	22 - 38	R. Vaega (2), N. Willett, E. Bullemor	A. Schoupp (3/3), R. Garrick (0/1)		Grant Atkins	

=== Regular season ===
Ladder

Pos	Team	Pld	W	D	L	B	PF	PA	PD	Pts	Qualification
1	Canberra Raiders	24	19	0	5	3	654	506	+148	44	Advance to finals series
2	Melbourne Storm	24	17	0	7	3	671	459	+212	40	Advance to finals series
3	Canterbury-Bankstown Bulldogs	24	16	0	8	3	534	414	+120	38	Advance to finals series
4	Brisbane Broncos (P)	24	15	0	9	3	680	508	+172	36	Advance to finals series
5	Cronulla-Sutherland Sharks	24	15	0	9	3	599	490	+109	36	Advance to finals series
6	New Zealand Warriors	24	14	0	10	3	517	496	+21	34	Advance to finals series
7	Penrith Panthers	24	13	1	10	3	576	469	+107	33	Advance to finals series
8	Sydney Roosters	24	13	0	11	3	653	521	+132	32	Advance to finals series
9	Dolphins	24	12	0	12	3	721	596	+125	30	
10	Manly Warringah Sea Eagles	24	12	0	12	3	555	534	+21	30	
11	Parramatta Eels	24	10	0	14	3	502	578	−76	26	
12	North Queensland Cowboys	24	9	1	14	3	538	684	−146	25	
13	Wests Tigers	24	9	0	15	3	477	612	−135	24	
14	South Sydney Rabbitohs	24	9	0	15	3	427	608	−181	24	
15	St. George Illawarra Dragons	24	8	0	16	3	498	628	−130	22	
16	Gold Coast Titans	24	6	0	18	3	520	719	−199	18	
17	Newcastle Knights	24	6	0	18	3	338	638	−300	18	

Source: National Rugby League
(P) Premiers

Matches

Date	Round	Opponent	Venue	Score	Tries	Goals	Field goals	Referee	Attendance
Sat 8 March 7:35pm	1	North Queensland Cowboys	Brookvale Oval	42 - 12	H. Olakau'atu, J. Saab, B. Trbojevic, E. Bullemor, T. Sipley, R. Garrick, D. Cherry-Evans	R. Garrick (7/8)		Peter Gough	17,335
Fri 14 March 6:00pm (8:00pm NZDT)	2	New Zealand Warriors	Go Media Stadium	36 - 16	T. Trbojevic, J. Saab, D. Cherry-Evans	R. Garrick (2/4)		Adam Gee	21,212
Sun 23 March 6:15pm	3	Canberra Raiders	Brookvale Oval	40 - 12	R. Garrick (4), E. Bullemor (2), J. Simpkin	R. Garrick (6/7)		Grant Atkins	16,125
Sun 30 March 4:05pm	4	Parramatta Eels	Brookvale Oval	26 - 12	J. Saab, L. Hopoate, C. Waddell, T. Koula	R. Garrick (5/6)		Todd Smith	17,286
Sun 6 April 4:05pm	5	Melbourne Storm	Brookvale Oval	24 - 48	T. Koula (2), J. Saab, C. Faulalo	R. Garrick (4/6)		Grant Atkins	17,346
Sat 16 April 3:00pm (1:00pm AWST)	6	Cronulla-Sutherland Sharks	Optus Stadium	24 - 18	C. Faulalo, L. Brooks, D. Cherry-Evans	R. Garrick (3/3)		Adam Gee	26,497
Thu 17 April 7:50pm	7	St. George Illawarra Dragons	Brookvale Oval	18 - 20	T. Koula, B. Trbojevic, J. Saab	R. Garrick (3/4)		Peter Gough	17,254
Sat 26 April 7:35pm	8	Penrith Panthers	Commbank Stadium	10 - 26	R. Garrick, T. Talau, H. Olakau'atu, T. Koula	R. Garrick (5/6)		Belinda Sharpe	14,534
2-4 May	9	Bye							
Sun 11 May 4:05pm	10	Cronulla-Sutherland Sharks	Brookvale Oval	14 - 30	T. Koula (2)	R. Garrick (3/3)		Gerard Sutton	15,823
Sat 17 May 5:30pm	11	North Queensland Cowboys	Queensland Country Bank Stadium	6 - 24	J. Saab (2), L. Hopoate, B. Trbojevic	R. Garrick (4/5)		Grant Atkins	18,965
Fri 23 May 8:00pm	12	Parramatta Eels	Commbank Stadium	30 - 10	L. Hopoate (2)	R. Garrick (1/2)		Liam Kennedy	13,425
Sat 31 May 7:35pm	13	Brisbane Broncos	Brookvale Oval	34 - 6	C. Faulalo (2), H. Olakau'atu (2), N. Brown, T. Koula	R. Garrick (5/6)		Adam Gee	17,375
Thu 5 June 7:50pm	14	Newcastle Knights	McDonald Jones Stadium	26 - 22	T. Koula, T. Sipley, H. Olakau'atu, T. Talau	R. Garrick (3/4)		Wyatt Raymond	16,027
Fri 13 June 8:00pm	15	Gold Coast Titans	Cbus Super Stadium	28 - 8	R. Garrick (2)			Peter Gough	13,708
20-22 June	16	Bye							
Fri 27 June 6:00pm	17	Wests Tigers	Brookvale Oval	28 - 10	J. Saab, R. Garrick, T. Koula, C. Waddell, B. Trbojevic	R. Garrick (4/5)		Gerard Sutton	17,055
Sun 6 July 4:05pm	18	South Sydney Rabbitohs	Brookvale Oval	30 - 12	R. Garrick (2), T. Trbojevic (2), D. Cherry-Evans, T. Koula	R. Garrick (3/6)		Wyatt Raymond	17,298
11-13 July	19	Bye							
Sat 19 July 7:35pm	20	Melbourne Storm	AAMI Park	16 - 18	J. Saab, T. Koula, R. Garrick	R. Garrick (3/5)		Wyatt Raymond	19,011
Sun 27 July 4:05pm	21	Canterbury-Bankstown Bulldogs	Allianz Stadium	42 - 4	J. Saab			Ashley Klein	25,801
Sat 2 August 7:35pm	22	Sydney Roosters	Brookvale Oval	4 - 20	T. Koula			Grant Atkins	12,478
Fri 8 August 8:00pm	23	Canberra Raiders	GIO Stadium	28 - 12	T. Trbojevic, T. Koula	R. Garrick (2/2)		Peter Gough	14,527
Sun 17 August 2:00pm	24	Canterbury-Bankstown Bulldogs	Allianz Stadium	26 - 12	T. Koula, M. Lodge	R. Garrick (1/1), D. Cherry-Evans (1/1)		Adam Gee	13,105
Sat 23 August 3:00pm	25	Dolphins	Brookvale Oval	58 - 30	M. Lodge, L. Brooks (2), L. Hopoate (2), B. Trbojevic, T. Trbojevic (2), T. Koula	D. Cherry-Evans (9/10)		Ashley Klein	14,172
Sat 30 August 5:30pm	26	St. George Illawarra Dragons	Netstrata Jubilee Stadium	40 - 24	C. Waddell (2), T. Koula, D. Cherry-Evans, A. Schoupp, T. Talau, C. Navale	D. Cherry-Evans (6/7)		Adam Gee	9,769
Fri 5 September 6:00pm	27	Warriors	Brookvale Oval	27 - 26	L. Hopoate (2), J. Simpkin, L. Brooks, E. Bullemor	C. Cherry-Evans (3/5)		Todd Smith	17,172

== Representative players ==
- Daly Cherry-Evans ( Queensland - Captain game 1)
- Lehi Hopoate ( Tonga)
- Tolu Koula ( Tonga)
- Caleb Navale ( Fiji)
- Jason Saab ( (Australia) Prime Minister's XIII)
- Jacob Sykes ( Indigenous All Stars)
- Jazz Tevaga ( (Māori people) Māori All Stars, Samoa)
- Brandon Wakeham ( Fiji)
