= Eparama Navale =

Fiji international rugby league footballer (born 1975)

Personal information
- Full name: Eparama Navale
- Born: 2 February 1975 (age 51) Fiji

Playing information
- Position: Wing
Club
Years	Team	Pld	T	G	FG	P
1997–98	Parramatta Eels	16	8	0	0	32
2000	Northern Eagles	1	0	0	0	0
	Total	17	8	0	0	32
Representative
Years	Team	Pld	T	G	FG	P
1996	Fiji Prime Minister's XIII	1	1	0	0	4
2000	Fiji	3	1	0	0	4
- Relatives: Caleb Navale (son)

Eparama Navale is a Fijian rugby league footballer who represented Fiji at the 2000 World Cup.

== Playing career ==
Navale played for the Parramatta Eels in 1997 and 1998. In 2000, Navale played in one match for the Northern Eagles. In round 15 of the 1997 ARL season, Navale scored a hat-trick in the clubs victory over Western Suburbs. He played a total of 12 games that season and scored seven tries. Navale played in the clubs qualifying final loss against Newcastle as well that year. In the 1998 NRL season, Navaale was limited to only four matches with Parramatta. In 2000, Navale played one game for the Northern Eagles in round 23 against Brisbane.
