= Aaron Schoupp =

Australian rugby league footballer

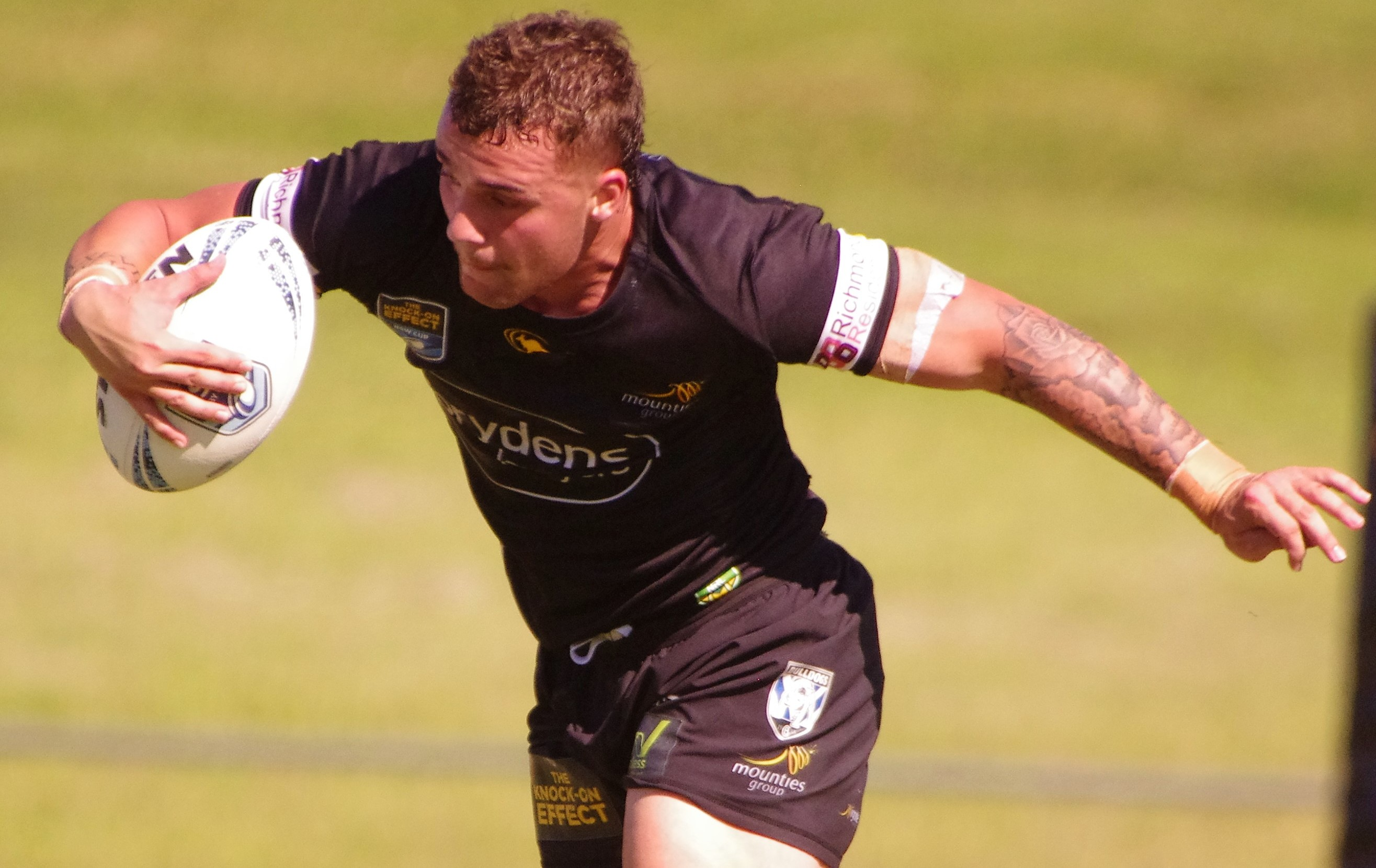

Personal information
- Born: 29 June 2001 (age 25) Figtree, New South Wales, Australia
- Height: 183 cm (6 ft 0 in)
- Weight: 102 kg (16 st 1 lb)

Playing information
- Position: Centre, Second-row
Club
Years	Team	Pld	T	G	FG	P
2021–22	Canterbury Bulldogs	32	9	0	0	36
2023–24	Gold Coast Titans	20	2	7	0	22
2024–26	Manly Sea Eagles	6	1	0	0	4
	Total	58	12	7	0	62
- Source: As of 28 June 2026
- Relatives: Blake Schoupp (brother)

Aaron Schoupp (born 29 June 2001) is an Australian professional rugby league footballer who most recently played as a centre for the Manly Warringah Sea Eagles in the National Rugby League (NRL).

== Early life ==
Schoupp was born in Figtree, near Wollongong in New South Wales, Australia. He played junior rugby league for the Thirroul Butchers. Aaron's brother Blake plays rugby union for the Brumbies & Wallabies. Aaron also played rugby union growing up.

== Playing career ==
=== 2021 ===
In round 11 of the 2021 NRL season, Schoupp made his first grade debut for Canterbury-Bankstown against the Gold Coast at Robina Stadium. Schoupp made a total of 13 appearances for Canterbury in the 2021 NRL season as the club finished last and claimed the Wooden Spoon.

=== 2022 ===
In round 11 of the 2022 NRL season, Schoupp was sent to the sin bin for a dangerous tackle and later scored a try in Canterbury's 36-22 loss against the Wests Tigers. Schoupp played a total of 19 matches for Canterbury in the 2022 NRL season as the club finished 12th on the table. On 9 November, Schoupp was granted an immediate release from Canterbury to sign a three-year deal with the Gold Coast starting in 2023.

=== 2023 ===
In round 3 of the 2023 NRL season, Schoupp scored two tries for the Gold Coast in their 38-34 victory over Melbourne. Schoupp played a total of 18 matches for the Gold Coast in the 2023 NRL season as the club finished 14th on the table.

=== 2024 ===
On 20 May 2024, the Manly Warringah Sea Eagles announced that they had signed Schoupp on a two-year contract, effective immediately. "Aaron adds depth to our squad as we have got a few injuries to our outside backs at the moment," said Sea Eagles Head Coach Anthony Seibold on the signing. "We feel like he is a good addition to our playing group."

=== 2025 ===
Schoupp made only four appearances with Manly in the 2025 NRL season. On 7 October, Manly announced that Schoupp had signed a 12 month extension with the club.

=== 2026 ===
Schoupp made only one appearance for Manly in the 2026 NRL season. In September, he was one of twelve players to be released by the club.

== Controversy ==
On 25 June 2021, Schoupp was one of three Canterbury players who were ordered to self-isolate after attending a COVID-19 exposure site in Sydney's Eastern Suburbs. The NRL had ordered players of all 16 teams a week earlier not to attend any restaurants, clubs or bars in the Waverley Local Government area.
