= Reuben Garrick =

Australian rugby league footballer (born 1997)

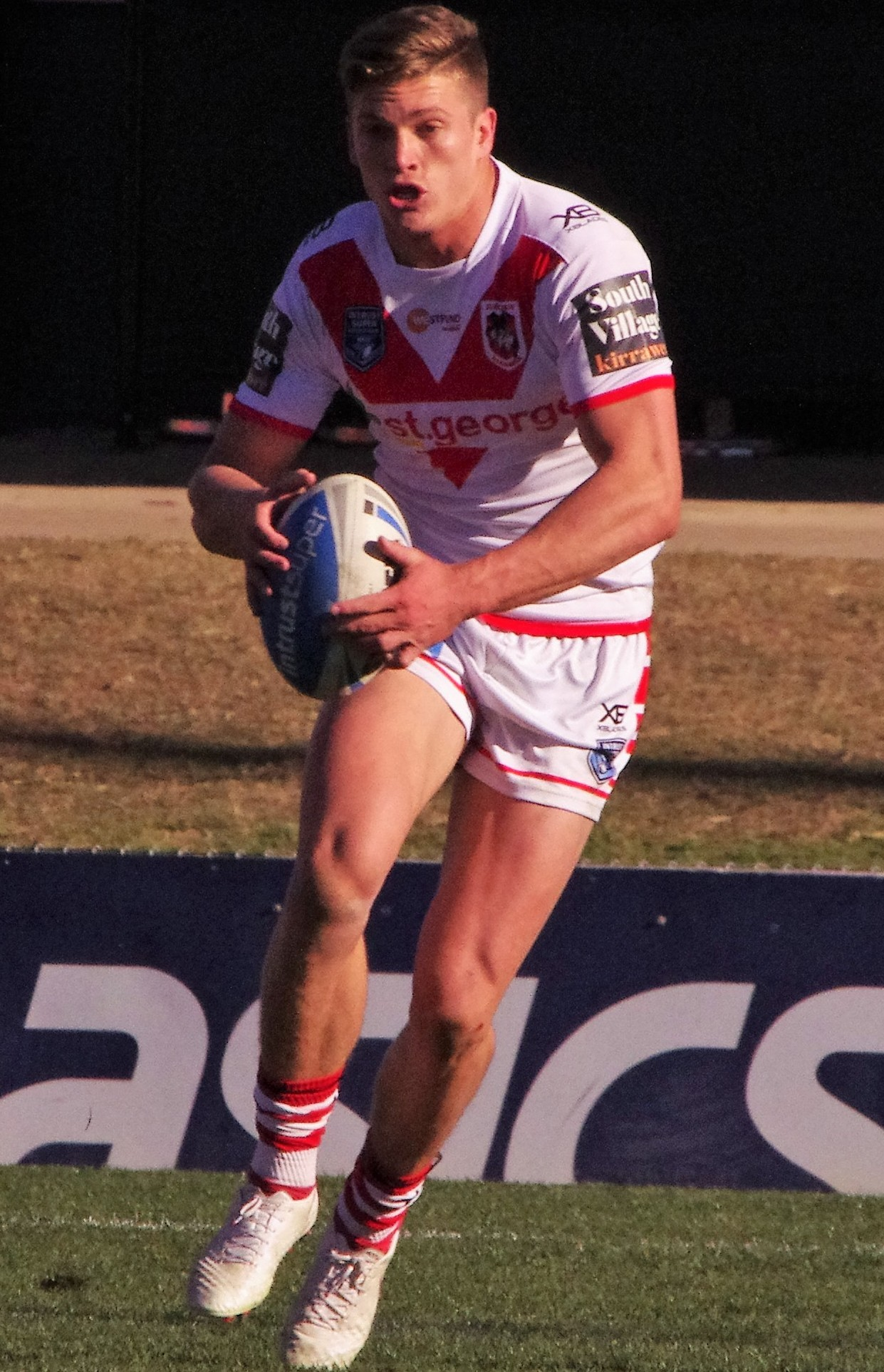

Personal information
- Born: 30 June 1997 (age 29) Sydney, New South Wales, Australia
- Height: 188 cm (6 ft 2 in)
- Weight: 98 kg (15 st 6 lb)

Playing information
- Position: Wing, Centre
Club
Years	Team	Pld	T	G	FG	P
2019–2026	Manly Sea Eagles	180	100	517	0	1434
2027–	Sydney Roosters	0	0	0	0	0
	Total	180	100	517	0	1434
Representative
Years	Team	Pld	T	G	FG	P
2019–24	Prime Minister's XIII	2	1	4	0	12
2019	Australia 9s	2	0	0	0	0
- Source: As of 5 September 2026

Reuben Garrick (born 30 June 1997) is an Australian professional rugby league footballer who plays as a centre for the Sydney Roosters in the National Rugby League.

He has played at representative level for the Prime Minister's XIII and for Australia 9s at the 2019 Rugby League World Cup 9s tournament. He has also played as a wing or fullback.

== Background ==
Garrick was born in Sydney, New South Wales. He played his junior rugby league for the Gerringong Lions.

Prior to playing in the NRL, Garrick played Under 20s and NSW Cup for the St. George Illawarra Dragons. During the 2018 season, Garrick signed a contract with Manly starting in 2019.

== Career ==
=== 2019 ===
Prior to playing in the NRL, Garrick played Under 20's and NSW Cup for the St. George Illawarra Dragons. During the 2018 season, Garrick signed a contract with Manly starting in 2019. Garrick made his first grade debut in Round 1 of the 2019 NRL season against the Wests Tigers. In Round 8 2019, Garrick scored all of Manly's 18 points as they defeated Canterbury-Bankstown 18-10 at Brookvale Oval. In the same week, Garrick signed a contract to stay with Manly until the end of the 2021 season.

In round 18 2019 against the Parramatta Eels, Garrick scored a hat-trick as Manly Warringah won the match 36-24 at Brookvale Oval. In round 20 2019 against Newcastle, Garrick scored 2 tries and kicked 3 goals as Manly won the match 30-6 at Brookvale Oval.

In round 21 2019, Garrick scored 2 tries for Manly-Warringah in a 24-16 loss against the New Zealand Warriors at Mount Smart Stadium.

Garrick finished the 2019 NRL season as Manly's top try scorer and top point scorer. The club would go on to reach the second week of the finals but were eliminated in the semi-final by South Sydney.

On 30 September, Garrick earned his first representative jersey as he was named on the bench for the Australia PM XIII side against Fiji PM XIII, which he scored his first representative try in the 10-52 demolishing of Fiji at ANZ National stadium in Fiji. On 7 October, Garrick was named in the Australian side for the 2019 Rugby League World Cup 9s. Later that day, Garrick was named at wing for the U23 Junior Australian side, and on 25 October, he kicked two goals in the 62-4 win against France at WIN stadium.

=== 2020 ===
In round 15 of the 2020 NRL season, Garrick scored two tries and kicked two goals in a 56-16 loss against South Sydney at ANZ Stadium.

Garrick played 17 games for Manly Warringah in 2020 as they finished a disappointing 13th on the table. He had a difficult second season in the NRL but managed to finish as Manly's top point scorer.

=== 2021 ===
In round 6 of the 2021 NRL season, Garrick scored two tries and kicked six goals in Manly's 36-0 victory over the Gold Coast.

In round 7, Garrick scored one try and kicked six goals for Manly in a 40-6 victory over the Wests Tigers.

In round 14 against the North Queensland Cowboys, Garrick scored a try and kicked seven goals as Manly won the match 50-18.

The following week, Garrick scored four tries for Manly in a 56-24 victory over the Gold Coast Titans.

In round 16 against Canterbury, Garrick equalled the club record for most points scored by a Manly player in a game with 30 points, scoring two tries and kicking 11 goals in a 66-0 victory. In round 21, Garrick scored two tries in Manly's 28-18 loss against Melbourne.

In round 22, Garrick scored a hat-trick in Manly's 56-10 victory over the Parramatta Eels.

In round 24, Garrick became the first player in NRL history to score 20 tries and kick 100 goals in a season during Manly's victory over wooden spooners Canterbury.

In round 25, Garrick overtook Hazem El Masri's record for most points by a player during a regular NRL season in Manly's 46-18 victory over North Queensland.

In the 2021 Finals Series, Garrick scored two tries for Manly in a 36-16 loss against South Sydney in the preliminary final.

Reuben Garrick won the 2021 Steve Menzies Medal for the Play of the Year for his outstanding effort that led to the NRL Try of the Year award against North Queensland in Townsville in round 25. On 27 September, Garrick was named Dally M Winger of the year.

=== 2022 ===
In round 9 of the 2022 NRL season, Garrick scored two tries and kicked four goals in a 36-22 victory over the Wests Tigers. In round 11, Garrick scored two tries and kicked two goals in Manly's 22-20 loss against Parramatta. In round 13, Garrick scored two tries and kicked eight goals for Manly in a 44-12 victory over the New Zealand Warriors. Garrick finished as both the club's top try scorer and point scorer in 2022.

=== 2023 ===
In round 15 of the 2023 NRL season, Garrick scored a hat-trick and kicked nine goals in Manly's 58-18 victory over the Dolphins. Garrick played 21 games for Manly in the 2023 NRL season as the club finished 12th on the table and missed the finals. Garrick finished as the club's top point scorer with 174 points.

=== 2024 ===
In round 8 of the 2024 NRL season, Garrick scored two tries and kicked six goals in Manly's 32-18 win over Parramatta. The following week, Garrick scored a further two tries but only kicked two goals from five conversion attempts as Manly lost against Canberra 26-24.

In the Second Elimination Final against the Canterbury-Bankstown Bulldogs at Accor Stadium, Garrick kicked 4/4 goals in Manly's 24-22 come from behind win. With his second goal just before halftime converting an Ethan Bullemor try, Garrick moved into outright 3rd place on Manly's all-time point scoring list ahead of Bob Batty (1959-71 - 1,154 points). Garrick finished the day with 1,160 points scored in First Grade, behind only Graham Eadie (1,917) and Jamie Lyon (1,410).

=== 2025 ===
In round 3 of the 2025 NRL season, Garrick scored four tries and kicked six goals in Manly's 40-12 victory over Canberra. Garrick played 21 matches for Manly in the 2025 NRL season as the club finished 10th on the table. On 27 November it was reported that Garrick had signed a deal with the Sydney Roosters starting in 2027. On 4 December, the Sydney Roosters confirmed that Garrick had signed a three-year contract with the team starting in the 2027 season.

=== 2026 ===
Garrick played 23 matches for Manly in the 2026 NRL season as the club finished 9th on the table. Garrick finished his Manly career as the club second highest points scorer.

== Statistics ==
Year	Team	Games	Tries	Goals	Pts
2019	Manly Warringah Sea Eagles	26	16	65	194
2020	Manly Warringah Sea Eagles	17	4	41	98
2021	Manly Warringah Sea Eagles	27	23	121	334
2022	Manly Warringah Sea Eagles	21	12	57	162
2023	Manly Warringah Sea Eagles	21	12	63	174
2024	Manly Warringah Sea Eagles	24	10	81	202
2025	Manly Warringah Sea Eagles	21	12	64	176
2026	Manly Warringah Sea Eagles	10	5	21	62
	Totals	167	94	513	1402
