= 2026 NRL season =

Australian rugby league season

2026 National Rugby League
- Duration: 28 February (Note: Local time in Las Vegas.) – 4 October 2026
- Teams: 17
- Premiers: Sydney Roosters (16th title)
- Minor premiers: Penrith Panthers (6th title)
- Matches played: 213
- Points scored: 10,167
- Average attendance: 21,858
- Total attendance: 4,502,688
- Top points scorer: Jamayne Isaako (310)
- Wooden spoon: St. George Illawarra Dragons (1st spoon)
- Biggest home win: Storm 52–4 Eels; AAMI Park; 5 March, Round 1
- Biggest away win: Cowboys 12–82 Roosters; Queensland Country Bank Stadium; 30 July, Round 22
- Dally M Medal: Nathan Cleary
- Top try-scorer(s): Alex Johnston & Thomas Jenkins (30)

The 2026 NRL season was the 119th season of professional rugby league in Australia and the 29th season run by the National Rugby League (NRL). The regular season was followed by a finals series contested by the top eight teams on the competition ladder. The Penrith Panthers were the minor premiers, while the Sydney Roosters defeated the Newcastle Knights in the Grand Final to win their 16th premiership.

The season recorded the highest aggregate and average regular season crowds in first-grade rugby league history, surpassing the record set the previous year.

The season was also the highest scoring in first-grade rugby league history, with 10,167 points scored across 213 games, surpassing the 253 game 1998 season in which 10,131 points were scored. At an average of 47.73 points scored per match, 2026 was also the highest average scoring season since 2004. (Note: in which 9,086 points were scored across 189 matches, an average of 48.07 points per game.)

== Teams ==
The lineup of teams in the league remained unchanged for the 4th and final consecutive year, with seventeen participating in the regular season: ten from New South Wales, four from Queensland, and one from each of Victoria, the Australian Capital Territory, and New Zealand.

Club	Season	Home ground(s)	Head coach	Captain(s)
Brisbane Broncos	39th season	Suncorp Stadium	Michael Maguire	Adam Reynolds
Canberra Raiders	45th season	GIO Stadium	Ricky Stuart	Joseph Tapine
Canterbury-Bankstown Bulldogs	92nd season	Accor Stadium	Cameron Ciraldo	Stephen Crichton
Cronulla-Sutherland Sharks	60th season	Ocean Protect Stadium	Craig Fitzgibbon	Blayke Brailey & Cameron McInnes
Dolphins	4th season	Suncorp Stadium and Kayo Stadium	Kristian Woolf	Tom Gilbert & Isaiya Katoa
Gold Coast Titans	20th season	Cbus Super Stadium	Josh Hannay	Tino Fa'asuamaleaui & Moeaki Fotuaika
Manly Warringah Sea Eagles	77th season	4 Pines Park	~~Anthony Seibold~~ → Kieran Foran	Jake Trbojevic & Tom Trbojevic
Melbourne Storm	29th season	AAMI Park	Craig Bellamy	Harry Grant
Newcastle Knights	39th season	McDonald Jones Stadium	Justin Holbrook	Kalyn Ponga
New Zealand Warriors	32nd season	Go Media Stadium	Andrew Webster	Mitchell Barnett & James Fisher-Harris
North Queensland Cowboys	32nd season	Queensland Country Bank Stadium	Todd Payten	Reuben Cotter & Tom Dearden
Parramatta Eels	80th season	CommBank Stadium	Jason Ryles	Mitchell Moses
Penrith Panthers	60th season	CommBank Stadium (Note: Penrith's usual home ground, Penrith Stadium, is not usable due to ongoing renovations)	Ivan Cleary	Nathan Cleary & Isaah Yeo
South Sydney Rabbitohs	117th season	Accor Stadium	Wayne Bennett	Cameron Murray
St. George Illawarra Dragons	28th season	St. George Venues Jubilee Stadium and WIN Stadium	~~Shane Flanagan~~ → Dean Young	Damien Cook & Clint Gutherson
Sydney Roosters	119th season	Allianz Stadium	Trent Robinson	James Tedesco
Wests Tigers	27th season	CommBank Stadium, Leichhardt Oval, and Campbelltown Sports Stadium	Benji Marshall	Apisai Koroisau & Jarome Luai

== Venues ==
Venues for the 2026 National Rugby League competition.

New South Wales
Sydney	Parramatta	Sydney Olympic Park	Woolooware
Allianz Stadium	CommBank Stadium	Accor Stadium	Ocean Protect Stadium
Capacity: 42,500	Capacity: 30,000	Capacity: 82,000	Capacity: 15,000
Brookvale	Leumeah	Lilyfield	Carlton
4 Pines Park	Campbelltown Sports Stadium	Leichhardt Oval	St. George Venues Jubilee Stadium
Capacity: 18,000	Capacity: 17,500	Capacity: 20,000	Capacity: 20,500
Newcastle	Gosford	Wollongong	
McDonald Jones Stadium	polytec Stadium	WIN Stadium	
Capacity: 27,500	Capacity: 20,059	Capacity: 22,000	
Mudgee	Bathurst		
Glen Willow Oval	Carrington Park		
Capacity: 10,000	Capacity: 13,000		
Queensland
Brisbane	Redcliffe	Gold Coast	Townsville
Suncorp Stadium	Kayo Stadium	Cbus Super Stadium	Queensland Country Bank Stadium
Capacity: 52,500	Capacity: 10,000	Capacity: 27,690	Capacity: 25,455
Australian Capital Territory	Victoria	Western Australia	
Canberra	Melbourne	Perth	
GIO Stadium	AAMI Park	Optus Stadium	HBF Park
Capacity: 25,011	Capacity: 30,050	Capacity: 61,266	Capacity: 20,500
Northern Territory	New Zealand		
Darwin	Auckland	Wellington	Christchurch
TIO Stadium	Go Media Stadium	Hnry Stadium	One New Zealand Stadium
Capacity: 12,215	Capacity: 25,000	Capacity: 34,500	Capacity: 25,000

=== Stadium locations ===
Venues used for the 2026 National Rugby League season.

2026 NRL season stadium locations (Australia and New Zealand)
1 Penrith Panthers
2 Parramatta Eels
3 Sydney Roosters
4 Wests Tigers
5 South Sydney Rabbitohs
6 St. George Illawarra Dragons
7 Newcastle Knights
8 Canberra Raiders
9 Brisbane Broncos
10 Dolphins
11 Gold Coast Titans
12 North Queensland Cowboys
13 Melbourne Storm
14 South Sydney Rabbitohs
15 Penrith Panthers
16 Penrith Panthers
17 New Zealand Warriors
18 New Zealand Warriors
19 New Zealand Warriors
20 Dolphins
21 Wests Tigers
22 St. George Illawarra Dragons

== Pre-season ==
=== Trials ===
Italics indicates a non-NRL club

Date	Time	Home	Score	Away	Stadium	Report
7 February 2026	18:00 AEST (UTC+10:00)	Central Queensland Capras	16–26	Dolphins	Marley Brown Oval, Gladstone	
14 February 2026	19:10 AEST (UTC+10:00)	Sunshine Coast Falcons	14–26	Brisbane Broncos	Sunshine Coast Stadium, Sunshine Coast	
22 February 2026	14:00 AEST (UTC+10:00)	Souths Logan Magpies	22–58	Brisbane Broncos	Davies Park, Brisbane	

=== All Stars match ===
15 February 2026
15:00 AEST

(Māori people) Māori All Stars	16–16	Indigenous All Stars
	Report

FMG Stadium Waikato, Hamilton
Attendance: 18,169
Referee: Adam Gee (Note: Gee was replaced by Belinda Sharpe after 60 minutes.)

=== Pre-season Challenge ===
The 16-game pre-season challenge was played from 7 to 22 February 2026 and was won by the Parramatta Eels, the first team to score the maximum 30 competition points.

== Regular season ==
=== Results ===
Team	1	2	3	4	5	6	7	8	9	10	11	12	13	14	15	16	17	18	19	20	21	22	23	24	25	26	27	F1	F2	F3	GF
Brisbane Broncos	**PEN** **–26**	**PAR** **–8**	MEL +4	**DOL** **+14**	GCT +14	**NQL** **–4**	WTI +1	**CBY** **+20**	SYD –14	MAN –28	NZL –30	X	**SGI** **–4**	**GCT** **–5**	SOU –42	X	**SYD** **–6**	**CRO** **–12**	X	PEN +2	NQL –8	**NEW** **–24**	DOL –8	**NZL** **–34**	CAN +4	**MEL** **–26**	CBY +14				
Canberra Raiders	MAN +1*	NZL –34	**CBY** **–4**	**CRO** **–12**	NEW –20	SOU +2	**MEL** **+4**	WTI –19	GCT +16	**PEN** **–12**	X	**DOL** **–8**	**NQL** **+14**	**SYD** **–26**	PAR –3	MEL –22	**SGI** **+8**	X	CBY +24	**SOU** **+10**	**WTI** **+46**	PEN –24	**NEW** **–6**	CRO +4	**BRI** **–4**	X	NQL +20				
Canterbury-Bankstown Bulldogs	**SGI** **+1***	X	CAN +4	**NEW** **–8**	SOU –8	**PEN** **+16**	PAR –18	BRI –20	**NQL** **–16**	DOL –32	CRO –22	**MEL** **+10**	WTI –6	**PAR** **+2**	X	**MAN** **+1***	GCT +18	X	**CAN** **–24**	**WTI** **+32**	**NZL** **+12**	MEL +14	SYD –2	**SOU** **–16**	SGI +30	PEN –14	**BRI** **–14**				
Cronulla-Sutherland Sharks	**GCT** **+40**	PEN –20	**DOL** **–28**	CAN +12	**NZL** **+14**	**SYD** **–12**	X	NQL –12	**WTI** **+42**	SOU –24	**CBY** **+22**	X	**MAN** **+6**	**SGI** **+22**	NZL +2	SYD –19	X	BRI +12	DOL +66	**NEW** **+2**	MAN +36	**SOU** **+16**	SGI –8	**CAN** **–4**	GCT +8	PAR –20	**MEL** **–4**	**NQL** **+10**	SYD –36		
Dolphins	**SOU** **–10**	**GCT** **+4**	CRO +28	BRI –14	**MAN** **–34**	X	**PEN** **–1***	NZL –2	**MEL** **+18**	**CBY** **+32**	SOU +22	CAN +8	X	NQL +26	**SYD** **+38**	WTI +14	**NZL** **+2**	NEW –2	**CRO** **–66**	**NQL** **+20**	X	SGI +6	**BRI** **+8**	MAN +22	**PAR** **+18**	SYD +14	GCT +4	NZL +10	X	**SYD** **–16**	
Gold Coast Titans	CRO –40	DOL –4	NQL –14	**SGI** **+8**	**BRI** **–14**	PAR +42	NZL –8	X	**CAN** **–16**	SYD –16	**NEW** **–24**	MAN –2	X	BRI +5	WTI –8	**PEN** **+1**	**CBY** **–18**	X	MEL –4	**MAN** **+6**	SGI +20	**NZL** **–36**	**NQL** **–22**	NEW –10	**CRO** **–8**	**SOU** **–20**	**DOL** **–4**				
Manly Warringah Sea Eagles	**CAN** **–1***	**NEW** **–20**	X	**SYD** **–17**	DOL +34	SGI +10	NQL +32	**PAR** **+15**	PEN –2	**BRI** **+28**	WTI +28	**GCT** **+2**	CRO –6	**SOU** **+14**	X	CBY –1*	**MEL** **+26**	PAR –9	**NQL** **–1***	GCT –6	**CRO** **–36**	X	MEL –22	**DOL** **–22**	NEW +20	**SGI** **+34**	NZL –1				
Melbourne Storm	**PAR** **+48**	SGI +26	**BRI** **–4**	NQL –4	PEN –40	**NZL** **–24**	CAN –4	**SOU** **–42**	DOL –18	**WTI** **+28**	PAR +26	CBY –10	**SYD** **+14**	**NEW** **+2**	X	**CAN** **+22**	MAN –26	X	**GCT** **+4**	SYD –8	SOU –2	**CBY** **–14**	**MAN** **+22**	X	**PEN** **—8**	BRI +26	CRO +4				
Newcastle Knights	**NQL** **+10**	MAN +20	**WAR** **–26**	CBY +8	**CAN** **+20**	WTI –20	SYD –14	**PEN** **–32**	**SOU** **+4**	SGI +34	GCT +24	X	**PAR** **+6**	MEL –2	X	**SGI** **+2**	**WTI** **+6**	**DOL** **+1**	SOU –2	CRO –2	**SYD** **–1**	BRI +24	CAN +6	**GCT** **+10**	**MAN** **–20**	NZL –14	X	SOU +10	NZL +2	PEN +8	SYD –1
New Zealand Warriors	**SYD** **+24**	**CAN** **+34**	NEW +26	**WTI** **–18**	CRO –14	MEL +24	**GCT** **+8**	**DOL** **+2**	PAR +22	X	**BRI** **+30**	SGI +18	PEN –2	X	**CRO** **–2**	**NQL** **+18**	DOL –2	X	WTI +26	**SGI** **+8**	CBY –12	GCT +36	**PEN** **+16**	BRI +34	SOU +19	**NEW** **+14**	**MAN** **+1**	**DOL** **–10**	**NEW** **–2**		
North Queensland Cowboys	NEW –10	WTI –28	**GCT** **+14**	**MEL** **+4**	SGI +32	BRI +4	**MAN** **–32**	**CRO** **+12**	CBY +16	**PAR** **–3***	SYD +6	**SOU** **+12**	CAN –14	**DOL** **–26**	X	NZL –18	**PEN** **+14**	X	MAN +1*	DOL –20	**BRI** **+8**	**SYD** **–70**	GCT +22	PAR –2	X	**WTI** **+14**	**CAN** **–20**	CRO –10			
Parramatta Eels	MEL –48	BRI +8	**SGI** **+10**	PEN –28	**WTI** **–2***	**GCT** **–42**	**CBY** **+18**	MAN –15	**NZL** **–22**	NQL +3*	**MEL** **–26**	X	NEW –6	CBY –2	**CAN** **+3**	X	**SOU** **–20**	**MAN** **+9**	SYD –16	X	**PEN** **–6**	WTI +3	SOU –4	**NQL** **+2**	DOL –18	**CRO** **+20**	SGI –2				
Penrith Panthers	BRI +26	**CRO** **+20**	SYD +36	**PAR** **+28**	**MEL** **+40**	CBY –16	DOL +1*	NEW +32	**MAN** **+2**	CAN +12	**SGI** **+22**	X	**NZL** **+2**	WTI +68	X	GCT –1	NQL –14	**SOU** **+22**	X	**BRI** **–2**	PAR +6	**CAN** **+24**	NZL –16	**SYD** **–6**	MEL +8	**CBY** **+14**	**WTI** **+28**	**SYD** **+7**	X	**NEW** **–8**	
South Sydney Rabbitohs	DOL +10	SYD –8	**WTI** **+4**	X	**CBY** **+8**	**CAN** **–2**	**SGI** **+18**	MEL +42	NEW –4	**CRO** **+24**	**DOL** **–22**	NQL –12	X	MAN –14	**BRI** **+42**	X	PAR +20	PEN –22	**NEW** **+2**	CAN –10	**MEL** **+2**	CRO –16	**PAR** **+4**	CBY +16	**NZL** **–19**	GCT +20	**SYD** **+30**	**NEW** **–10**			
St. George Illawarra Dragons	CBY –1*	**MEL** **–26**	PAR –10	GCT –8	**NQL** **–32**	**MAN** **–10**	SOU –18	**SYD** **–46**	X	**NEW** **–34**	PEN –22	**NZL** **–18**	BRI +4	CRO –22	X	NEW –2	CAN –8	**WTI** **+14**	X	NZL –8	**GCT** **–20**	**DOL** **–6**	**CRO** **+8**	WTI +2	**CBY** **–30**	MAN –34	**PAR** **+2**				
Sydney Roosters	NZL –24	**SOU** **+8**	**PEN** **–36**	MAN +17	X	CRO +12	**NEW** **+14**	SGI +46	**BRI** **+14**	**GCT** **+16**	**NQL** **–6**	X	MEL –14	CAN +26	DOL –38	**CRO** **+19**	BRI +6	X	**PAR** **+16**	**MEL** **+8**	NEW +1	NQL +70	**CBY** **+2**	PEN +6	**WTI** **–1**	**DOL** **–14**	SOU –30	PEN –7	**CRO** **+36**	DOL +16	**NEW** **+1**
Wests Tigers	X	**NQL** **+28**	SOU –4	NZL +18	PAR +2*	**NEW** **+20**	**BRI** **–1**	**CAN** **+19**	CRO –42	MEL –28	**MAN** **–28**	X	**CBY** **+6**	**PEN** **–68**	**GCT** **+8**	**DOL** **–14**	NEW –6	SGI –14	**NZL** **–26**	CBY –32	CAN –46	**PAR** **–3**	X	**SGI** **–2**	SYD +1	NQL –14	PEN –28				
Team	1	2	3	4	5	6	7	8	9	10	11	12	13	14	15	16	17	18	19	20	21	22	23	24	25	26	27	F1	F2	F3	GF

Bold – Home game
X – Bye
* – Golden point game
Opponent for round listed above margin

== Ladder ==
Pos	Team	Pld	W	D	L	B	PF	PA	PD	Pts	Qualification
1	Penrith Panthers	24	18	0	6	3	683	347	+336	42	Advance to finals series
2	New Zealand Warriors	24	18	0	6	3	728	418	+310	42	Advance to finals series
3	Dolphins	24	17	0	7	3	662	506	+156	40	Advance to finals series
4	Sydney Roosters (P)	24	16	0	8	3	619	501	+118	38	Advance to finals series
5	Cronulla-Sutherland Sharks	24	14	0	10	3	672	523	+149	34	Advance to finals series
6	South Sydney Rabbitohs	24	14	0	10	3	694	581	+113	34	Advance to finals series
7	Newcastle Knights	24	14	0	10	3	633	591	+42	34	Advance to finals series
8	North Queensland Cowboys	24	13	0	11	3	568	652	−84	32	Advance to finals series
9	Manly Warringah Sea Eagles	24	11	0	13	3	623	524	+99	28	
10	Melbourne Storm	24	11	0	13	3	594	576	+18	28	
11	Canberra Raiders	24	11	0	13	3	581	626	−45	28	
12	Canterbury-Bankstown Bulldogs	24	11	0	13	3	476	536	−60	28	
13	Parramatta Eels	24	9	0	15	3	497	678	−181	24	
14	Brisbane Broncos	24	8	0	16	3	471	677	−206	22	
15	Wests Tigers	24	8	0	16	3	445	699	−254	22	
16	Gold Coast Titans	24	6	0	18	3	477	663	−186	18	
17	St. George Illawarra Dragons	24	5	0	19	3	392	717	−325	16	

Source: National Rugby League
Rules for classification: 1) competition points; 2) points differential; 3) percentage; (Note: Greater percentage of points scored for and against, being determined by points scored for divided by points scored against expressed as a percentage.) 4) tries scored; (Note: Further tiebreakers (in order) include goals scored, field goals kicked; least amount of penalties conceded.)
(P) Premiers

=== Ladder progression ===
- Numbers highlighted in green indicate that the team finished the round inside the top eight.
- Numbers highlighted in blue indicates the team finished first on the ladder in that round.
- Numbers highlighted in red indicates the team finished last place on the ladder in that round.
- Underlined numbers indicate that the team had a bye during that round.

	Team	1	2	3	4	5	6	7	8	9	10	11	12	13	14	15	16	17	18	19	20	21	22	23	24	25	26	27
1	Penrith Panthers	2	4	6	8	10	10	12	14	16	18	20	22	24	26	28	28	28	30	32	32	34	36	36	36	38	40	42
2	New Zealand Warriors	2	4	6	6	6	8	10	12	14	16	18	20	20	22	22	24	24	26	28	30	30	32	34	36	38	40	42
3	Dolphins	0	2	4	4	4	6	6	6	8	10	12	14	16	18	20	22	24	24	24	26	28	30	32	34	36	38	40
4	Sydney Roosters	0	2	2	4	6	8	10	12	14	16	16	18	18	20	20	22	24	26	28	30	32	34	36	38	38	38	38
5	Cronulla-Sutherland Sharks	2	2	2	4	6	6	8	8	10	10	12	14	16	18	20	20	22	24	26	28	30	32	32	32	34	34	34
6	South Sydney Rabbitohs	2	2	4	6	8	8	10	12	12	14	14	14	16	16	18	20	22	22	24	24	26	26	28	30	30	32	34
7	Newcastle Knights	2	4	4	6	8	8	8	8	10	12	14	16	18	18	20	22	24	26	26	26	26	28	30	32	32	32	34
8	North Queensland Cowboys	0	0	2	4	6	8	8	10	12	12	14	16	16	16	18	18	20	22	24	24	26	26	28	28	30	32	32
9	Manly Warringah Sea Eagles	0	0	2	2	4	6	8	10	10	12	14	16	16	18	20	20	22	22	22	22	22	24	24	24	26	28	28
10	Melbourne Storm	2	4	4	4	4	4	4	4	4	6	8	8	10	12	14	16	16	18	20	20	20	20	22	24	24	26	28
11	Canberra Raiders	2	2	2	2	2	4	6	6	8	8	10	10	12	12	12	12	14	16	18	20	22	22	22	24	24	26	28
12	Canterbury-Bankstown Bulldogs	2	4	6	6	6	8	8	8	8	8	8	10	10	12	14	16	18	20	20	22	24	26	26	26	28	28	28
13	Parramatta Eels	0	2	4	4	4	4	6	6	6	8	8	10	10	10	12	14	14	16	16	18	18	20	20	22	22	24	24
14	Brisbane Broncos	0	0	2	4	6	6	8	10	10	10	10	12	12	12	12	14	14	14	16	18	18	18	18	18	20	20	22
15	Wests Tigers	2	4	4	6	8	10	10	12	12	12	12	14	16	16	18	18	18	18	18	18	18	18	20	20	22	22	22
16	Gold Coast Titans	0	0	0	2	2	4	4	6	6	6	6	6	8	10	10	12	12	14	14	16	18	18	18	18	18	18	18
17	St. George Illawarra Dragons	0	0	0	0	0	0	0	0	2	2	2	2	4	4	6	6	6	8	10	10	10	10	12	14	14	14	16

== Finals series ==
Home	Score	Away	Match Information
Home	Score	Away	Date and time (AEST)	Venue	Referee	Attendance
Qualifying and elimination finals
South Sydney Rabbitohs	10–20	Newcastle Knights	11 September, 19:50	Allianz Stadium	Ashley Klein	28,152
New Zealand Warriors	16–26	Dolphins	12 September, 16:05	Go Media Stadium	Adam Gee	26,131
Cronulla-Sutherland Sharks	26–16	North Queensland Cowboys	12 September, 19:50	Allianz Stadium	Grant Atkins	17,429
Penrith Panthers	19–12	Sydney Roosters	13 September, 16:05	CommBank Stadium	Gerard Sutton	22,148
Semi-finals
Sydney Roosters	46–10	Cronulla-Sutherland Sharks	19 September, 19:50	Allianz Stadium	Adam Gee	39,147
New Zealand Warriors	10–12	Newcastle Knights	20 September, 16:05	Eden Park	Ashley Klein	48,511
Preliminary finals
Dolphins	20–36	Sydney Roosters	25 September, 19:50	Suncorp Stadium	Adam Gee	52,286
Penrith Panthers	14–22	Newcastle Knights	27 September, 16:00	Accor Stadium	Gerard Sutton	57,102

=== Bracket ===
Qualifying and elimination finals
13 September – Sydney
1	Penrith	19
4	Sydney	12
12 September – Sydney
5	Cronulla-Sutherland	26
8	North Queensland	16
11 September – Sydney
6	South Sydney	10
7	Newcastle	20
12 September – Auckland
2	New Zealand	16
3	Dolphins	26

Semi-finals
19 September – Sydney
Sydney	46
Cronulla-Sutherland	10
20 September – Auckland
New Zealand	10
Newcastle	12

Preliminary finals
27 September – Sydney
Penrith	14
Newcastle	22
25 September – Brisbane
Dolphins	20
Sydney	36

Grand final
4 October – Sydney
Sydney	19
Newcastle	18

== Player statistics and records ==
- In Round 2, Alex Johnston surpassed Ken Irvine's record of 212 tries in the NRL and its predecessor competitions.
- In Round 5, Thomas Jenkins became the first player to score 12 tries in their first 5 games of a season, having tied the record of 10 tries in the first 4 games the previous week.
- In Round 7, Thomas Jenkins became the first player in the NRL era to score 2 or more tries in 7 consecutive games.
- In Round 9, Alex Johnston became the first player in the NRL and its predecessor competitions to score 17 career hat-tricks. Johnson also became the first player to score 100 or more tries at a single venue, that being Accor Stadium.
- In Round 10, Jason Taumalolo surpassed former teammate Johnathan Thurston as the most capped North Queensland Cowboys player of all time.
- In Round 12, Moeaki Fotuaika surpassed Mark Minichiello as the most capped Gold Coast Titans player of all time.
- In Round 12, Alex Johnston became the first player in the NRL era to score a try in each of their first ten games of a season, surpassing KL Iro who scored in his first nine games in 2025.
- In Round 19, Daniel Tupou became the fifth player to play 300 games for the Sydney Roosters.
- In Round 24, Jamayne Isaako became the fastest player to score 1,000 points for a single club, doing so in his 93rd game for the Dolphins. (Note: This figure is not adjusted by era; previous record holder Mick Cronin accomplished the feat in 98 games when a try was only worth 3 points.)
- In Round 25, Phillip Sami surpassed former teammate Anthony Don as the greatest tryscorer in Gold Coast Titans history.

The following statistics are as of the conclusion of the finals series.

Top 5 point scorers

Points	Player	Club	Tries	Goals	Field goals
310	Jamayne Isaako	Dolphins	23	109	0
218	Nicholas Hynes	Cronulla-Sutherland Sharks	8	93	0
218	Nathan Cleary	Penrith Panthers	6	96	2
209	Sam Walker	Sydney Roosters	11	82	1
178	Jayden Campbell	Gold Coast Titans	12	65	0

Top 5 try scorers

Tries	Player	Club
30	Alex Johnston	South Sydney Rabbitohs
30	Thomas Jenkins	Penrith Panthers
25	Greg Marzhew	Newcastle Knights
23	Dominic Young	Newcastle Knights
23	Jamayne Isaako	Dolphins

Top 5 goal kickers

Goals	Player	Club
109	Jamayne Isaako	Dolphins
96	Nathan Cleary	Penrith Panthers
93	Nicholas Hynes	Cronulla-Sutherland Sharks
82	Sam Walker	Sydney Roosters
81	Ethan Sanders	Canberra Raiders

Top 5 tacklers

Tackles	Player	Club
1,077	Phoenix Crossland	Newcastle Knights
1,029	Siua Wong	Sydney Roosters
996	Hamish Stewart	St. George Illawarra Dragons
976	Heilum Luki	North Queensland Cowboys
958	Reece Robson	Sydney Roosters

== Team of the Year ==
=== Players' Dream Team ===
The Rugby League Players Association announced the 2026 Players' Dream team on 21 September 2026.

Jersey	Position	Player
1	Fullback	James Tedesco
2	Wing	Selwyn Cobbo
3	Centre	Herbie Farnworth
4	Centre	Simi Sasagi
5	Wing	Mark Nawaqanitawase
6	Five-eighth	Braydon Trindall
7	Halfback	Nathan Cleary
8	Prop	Naufahu Whyte
9	Hooker	Wayde Egan
10	Prop	Payne Haas
11	Second-row	Haumole Olakau'atu
12	Second-row	Tallis Duncan
13	Lock	Erin Clark
14	Impact	Kurt Donoghoe

== Weekly awards ==
After each round, the NRL announces via social media two weekly awards. The player with the most fantasy points each round is announced through the NRL Fantasy social media account.

Round	Most Fantasy Points		Try of the Week		Tackle of the Week	Ref
Round	Player	Points	Try-scorer	Assisting Players	Tackle of the Week	Ref
Sponsor	Home Hardware		Kia Tasman		youi	
1	Damien Cook	91	Jamal Fogarty	Tolutau Koula	KL Iro	
2	Nathan Cleary	92	Alex Johnston	Multiple passes through to break the line, final pass by Latrell Mitchell	Keano Kini	
3	Tanah Boyd	86	Brian To'o	Two solo chip kicks in succession to recover and score	Connor Tracey	
4	Arama Hau	87	Tolutau Koula	Solo run 85m through the middle	Jacob Saifiti	
5	Jake Clifford	89	Apa Twidle	Passed across multiple players to the right corner, last pass by Joash Papalii	Taine Tuaupiki	
6	Keano Kini	90	Kaeo Weekes	Solo run from own end goal, beating multiple defenders	Roger Tuivasa-Sheck	
7	Herbie Farnworth	109	Jahream Bula	Adam Doueihi	Chanel Harris-Tavita	
8	Dylan Brown	96	Royce Hunt	Alex Twal	Kaeo Weekes	
9	Jackson Ford	90	Sualauvi Fa'alogo	Solo kick return from 85m out	Reece Walsh	
10	Greg Marzhew	116	Tolutau Koula	Chip kick by Brandon Wakeham, offloaded by Clayton Faulalo	Haumole Olakau'atu	
11	Herbie Farnworth	93	Tolutau Koula	Luke Brooks	Hohepa Puru	
12	Jacob Kiraz & Matt Burton	83	Alofiana Khan-Pereira	Multiple passes across the team, last pass by Chanel Harris-Tavita	Jack Underhill	
13	Dylan Lucas	90	Dylan Lucas	Fletcher Sharpe	Jahream Bula	
14	Thomas Jenkins	89	Keano Kini	Solo chip-and-chase	Phillip Sami	
15	Jarome Luai	91	Brad Schneider	Kick in field from Tevita Naufahu	Tevita Naufahu	
16	Sualauvi Fa'alogo	83	Lindsay Collins	Multiple passes inside and outside, last pass from James Tedesco	Te Maire Martin	
17	Terrell May	84	Jeremiah Nanai	Recovered bomb kick by Jake Clifford	Hamiso Tabuai-Fidow	
18	Liam Henry	83	Kelma Tuilagi	Behind-the-back flick pass from Dylan Walker	Isaiah Iongi	
19	Nicho Hynes	107	Robert Toia	Passed by multiple players across the field, final pass back infield by Mark Nawaqanitawase	Braydon Trindall	
20	Toby Couchman	82	Alofiana Khan-Pereira	Kurt Capewell	Dylan Edwards	
21	Nicho Hynes	106	Sualauvi Fa'alogo	Solo run from 80m out through the middle	Jahrome Hughes	
22	Sam Walker	106	Sam Walker	Cody Ramsey	Sualauvi Fa'alogo	
23	Dominic Young	85	Luke Metcalf	Kurt Capewell	James Fisher-Harris	
24	Joseph Tapine	85	Tom Chester	Full team try across the width of the field and back, final pass Braidon Burns with behind-the-back flick	Jason Taumalolo	
25	Herbie Farnworth	99	Chanel Harris-Tavita	Linebreak assist by Demitric Vaimauga then passed by Eddie Ieremia-Toeava	Josiah Karapani	
26	Cameron Murray	107	David Fifita	Solo linebreak and run from 70m out	Max Plath	
27	Coby Black	98	Coby Black	Kicked back infield by Xavier Savage, kicked ahead and recovered	Taine Tuaupiki	
FW1	Herbie Farnworth	93	Not announced			
FW2	Fletcher Sharpe	74	Not announced			
FW3	Sandon Smith	80	Not announced			

== Attendances ==
=== Club figures ===
Team	Games	Total	2026 Average	2025 Average	Difference	Highest	Lowest
Brisbane Broncos	12	493,936	41,161	41,185	-24	45,882	36,476
Canberra Raiders	12	179,588	14,966	19,136	-4,170	20,512	8,507
Canterbury-Bankstown Bulldogs	12	278,030	23,169	30,688	-7,519	45,719	13,802
Cronulla-Sutherland Sharks	11*	159,211	14,474	12,856	+1,618	33,404	10,793
Dolphins	12	280,297	23,358	21,820	+1,538	50,188	10,023
Gold Coast Titans	11*	194,657	17,696	16,410	+1,286	26,223	11,743
Manly Warringah Sea Eagles	12	189,668	15,806	16,393	-587	17,389	11,108
Melbourne Storm	12	229,254	19,105	21,677	-2,572	28,245	12,386
Newcastle Knights	12	285,612	23,801	20,891	+2,910	45,719	16,896
New Zealand Warriors	11*	281,593	25,599	23,188	+2,411	34,812	23,067
North Queensland Cowboys	12	232,771	19,398	18,649	+749	25,461	15,835
Parramatta Eels	11*	208,187	18,926	15,904	+3,022	29,397	12,804
Penrith Panthers	11*	183,296	16,663	16,695	-32	22,813	10,000
South Sydney Rabbitohs	11*	268,014	24,365	16,070	+8,295	49,813	10,009
St. George Illawarra Dragons	12	164,843	13,737	12,505	+1,232	40,381	8,491
Sydney Roosters	11*	262,441	23,858	23,799	+59	41,424	12,226
Wests Tigers	11*	170,032	15,457	15,176	+281	21,803	9,773

* = Magic Round home game not counted

=== Top regular season crowds ===
Rank	Home team	Away team	Crowd	Venue	City	Round
1	Dolphins	Brisbane Broncos	50,188	Suncorp Stadium	Brisbane	23
2	South Sydney Rabbitohs	Canterbury-Bankstown Bulldogs	49,813	Accor Stadium	Sydney	5
3	Brisbane Broncos	Dolphins	45,882	Suncorp Stadium	Brisbane	4
4	Newcastle Knights	North Queensland Cowboys	45,719	Allegiant Stadium	Paradise	1
4	Canterbury-Bankstown Bulldogs	St. George Illawarra Dragons	45,719	Allegiant Stadium	Paradise	1
5	Brisbane Broncos	North Queensland Cowboys	45,582	Suncorp Stadium	Brisbane	6
6	Brisbane Broncos	Penrith Panthers	45,566	Suncorp Stadium	Brisbane	1
7	Brisbane Broncos	Canterbury-Bankstown Bulldogs	42,775	Suncorp Stadium	Brisbane	8
8	Brisbane Broncos	St. George Illawarra Dragons	42,275	Suncorp Stadium	Brisbane	13
9	South Sydney Rabbitohs	Sydney Roosters	41,513	Allianz Stadium	Sydney	27
10	Sydney Roosters	South Sydney Rabbitohs	41,424	Allianz Stadium	Sydney	2
11	Brisbane Broncos	Gold Coast Titans	41,087	Suncorp Stadium	Brisbane	14
12	Dolphins	New Zealand Warriors	40,465	Suncorp Stadium	Brisbane	17
13	St. George Illawarra Dragons	Sydney Roosters	40,381	Allianz Stadium	Sydney	8
14	Brisbane Broncos	Sydney Roosters	39,826	Suncorp Stadium	Brisbane	17
15	Brisbane Broncos	Parramatta Eels	39,015	Suncorp Stadium	Brisbane	2
16	Brisbane Broncos	Cronulla-Sutherland Sharks	38,998	Suncorp Stadium	Brisbane	18
17	Brisbane Broncos	New Zealand Warriors	38,916	Suncorp Stadium	Brisbane	24
18	Canterbury-Bankstown Bulldogs	Parramatta Eels	37,638	Accor Stadium	Sydney	14
19	Brisbane Broncos	Newcastle Knights	37,538	Suncorp Stadium	Brisbane	22
20	Brisbane Broncos	Melbourne Storm	36,476	Suncorp Stadium	Brisbane	26
21	Dolphins	North Queensland Cowboys	35,213	Suncorp Stadium	Brisbane	20
22	New Zealand Warriors	Dolphins	34,812	Hnry Stadium	Wellington	8
23	South Sydney Rabbitohs	Canberra Raiders	33,404	Optus Stadium	Perth	6
23	Cronulla-Sutherland Sharks	Sydney Roosters	33,404	Optus Stadium	Perth	6
24	Sydney Roosters	Canterbury-Bankstown Bulldogs	30,306	Allianz Stadium	Sydney	23
25	South Sydney Rabbitohs	Newcastle Knights	30,113	Accor Stadium	Sydney	19

=== Magic Round (Round 11) ===
Home team	Away team	Date	Time	Venue	Match Figure	Day Total
Cronulla-Sutherland Sharks	Canterbury-Bankstown Bulldogs	Friday, 15 May	6:00 pm	Suncorp Stadium	45,236	48,673
South Sydney Rabbitohs	Dolphins	Friday, 15 May	8:05 pm	Suncorp Stadium	48,673	48,673
Wests Tigers	Manly Warringah Sea Eagles	Saturday, 16 May	3:00 pm	Suncorp Stadium	41,396	49,602
Sydney Roosters	North Queensland Cowboys	Saturday, 16 May	5:30 pm	Suncorp Stadium	49,602	49,602
Parramatta Eels	Melbourne Storm	Saturday, 16 May	7:45 pm	Suncorp Stadium	48,692	49,602
Gold Coast Titans	Newcastle Knights	Sunday, 17 May	2:00 pm	Suncorp Stadium	42,098	50,386
New Zealand Warriors	Brisbane Broncos	Sunday, 17 May	4:05 pm	Suncorp Stadium	50,386	50,386
Penrith Panthers	St. George Illawarra Dragons	Sunday, 17 May	6:25 pm	Suncorp Stadium	46,752	50,386
Bye: Canberra Raiders

=== Finals ===
Rank	Home team	Away team	Crowd	Venue	City
1	Sydney Roosters	Newcastle Knights	80,814	Accor Stadium	Sydney
2	Penrith Panthers	Newcastle Knights	57,102	Accor Stadium	Sydney
3	Dolphins	Sydney Roosters	52,286	Suncorp Stadium	Brisbane
4	New Zealand Warriors	Newcastle Knights	48,511	Eden Park	Auckland
5	Sydney Roosters	Cronulla Sutherland Sharks	39,147	Allianz Stadium	Sydney
6	South Sydney Rabbitohs	Newcastle Knights	28,152	Allianz Stadium	Sydney
7	New Zealand Warriors	Dolphins	26,131	Go Media Stadium	Auckland
8	Penrith Panthers	Sydney Roosters	22,148	Commbank Stadium	Sydney
9	Cronulla Sutherland Sharks	North Queensland Cowboys	17,429	Allianz Stadium	Sydney

== Match officials ==
- Includes Finals matches

Referee	Games
Adam Gee	29
Gerard Sutton	28
Grant Atkins	27
Todd Smith	26
Ashley Klein	25
Wyatt Raymond	24
Peter Gough	16
Liam Kennedy	16
Ziggy Przeklasa-Adamski	7
Jarrod Cole	7
Tyson Brough	3
Kieren Irons	2
Nick Pelgrave	2
Belinda Sharpe	1

== 2026 transfers ==
Player	2025 Club	2026 Club
Fletcher Baker	Brisbane Broncos	Canterbury-Bankstown Bulldogs
Selwyn Cobbo	Brisbane Broncos	Dolphins
Kobe Hetherington	Brisbane Broncos	Manly Warringah Sea Eagles
Jock Madden	Brisbane Broncos	Wests Tigers
Tyson Smoothy	Brisbane Broncos	Wakefield Trinity (Super League)
Martin Taupau	Brisbane Broncos	Retirement
Jamal Fogarty	Canberra Raiders	Manly Warringah Sea Eagles
Corey Harawira-Naera	Canberra Raiders	None
Albert Hopoate	Canberra Raiders	Warrington Wolves (Super League)
Danny Levi	Canberra Raiders	Leeds Rhinos (Super League)
Trey Mooney	Canberra Raiders	Newcastle Knights
Pasami Saulo	Canberra Raiders	Newcastle Knights
Manaia Waitere	Canberra Raiders	Melbourne Storm
Adam Cook	Canberra Raiders	Leigh Leopards (Super League)
Drew Hutchison	Canterbury-Bankstown Bulldogs	Albion Park-Oak Flats Eagles (Group 7 Rugby League)
Reed Mahoney	Canterbury-Bankstown Bulldogs	North Queensland Cowboys
Kurtis Morrin	Canterbury-Bankstown Bulldogs	Gold Coast Titans
Toby Sexton	Canterbury-Bankstown Bulldogs	Catalans Dragons (Super League)
Blake Taaffe	Canterbury-Bankstown Bulldogs	Castleford Tigers (Super League)
Blake Wilson	Canterbury-Bankstown Bulldogs	Manly Warringah Sea Eagles
Daniel Atkinson	Cronulla-Sutherland Sharks	St. George Illawarra Dragons
Kade Dykes	Cronulla-Sutherland Sharks	Canterbury-Bankstown Bulldogs
Kenny Bromwich	Dolphins	Retirement
Max Feagai	Dolphins	Gold Coast Titans
Peter Hola	Dolphins	Newcastle Knights
Harrison Graham	Dolphins	Newcastle Knights
Josh Kerr	Dolphins	St. George Illawarra Dragons
Mark Nicholls	Dolphins	Retirement
Sean O'Sullivan	Dolphins	Canterbury-Bankstown Bulldogs
Daniel Saifiti	Dolphins	Retirement
Aublix Tawha	Dolphins	Brisbane Broncos
Jacob Alick-Wiencke	Gold Coast Titans	Leigh Leopards (Super League)
Reagan Campbell-Gillard	Gold Coast Titans	London Broncos (RFL Championship)
Iszac Fa'asuamaleaui	Gold Coast Titans	Catalans Dragons (Super League)
David Fifita	Gold Coast Titans	South Sydney Rabbitohs
Kieran Foran	Gold Coast Titans	Retirement
Carter Gordon	Gold Coast Titans	Queensland Reds (Super Rugby)
Alofiana Khan-Pereira	Gold Coast Titans	New Zealand Warriors
Ken Maumalo	Gold Coast Titans	Retirement
Harley Smith-Shields	Gold Coast Titans	None
Ryan Sutton	Gold Coast Titans	Bradford Bulls (Super League)
Sean Mullany	Gold Coast Titans	Mackay Cutters (Queensland Cup)
Tom Weaver	Gold Coast Titans	Castleford Tigers (Super League)
Brian Kelly	Gold Coast Titans	Parramatta Eels
Josh Aloiai	Manly Warringah Sea Eagles	Retirement
Gordon Chan Kum Tong	Manly Warringah Sea Eagles	Canterbury-Bankstown Bulldogs
Michael Chee-Kam	Manly Warringah Sea Eagles	Retirement
Daly Cherry-Evans	Manly Warringah Sea Eagles	Sydney Roosters
Lachlan Croker	Manly Warringah Sea Eagles	Retirement
Matthew Lodge	Manly Warringah Sea Eagles	North Queensland Cowboys
Toafofoa Sipley	Manly Warringah Sea Eagles	Warrington Wolves (Super League)
Tommy Talau	Manly Warringah Sea Eagles	Sydney Roosters
Jazz Tevaga	Manly Warringah Sea Eagles	Wakefield Trinity (Super League)
Dean Matterson	Manly Warringah Sea Eagles	Albi Rugby League (Super XIII)
Grant Anderson	Melbourne Storm	Brisbane Broncos
Nelson Asofa-Solomona	Melbourne Storm	Retirement
Bronson Garlick	Melbourne Storm	South Sydney Rabbitohs
Dean Ieremia	Melbourne Storm	Gold Coast Titans
Ryan Papenhuyzen	Melbourne Storm	Retirement
Jonah Pezet	Melbourne Storm	Parramatta Eels
Taj Annan	Newcastle Knights	Western Force (Super Rugby)
Jake Arthur	Newcastle Knights	Hull F.C. (Super League)
Jayden Brailey	Newcastle Knights	Canberra Raiders
Jack Cogger	Newcastle Knights	Penrith Panthers
Adam Elliott	Newcastle Knights	South Sydney Rabbitohs
Jackson Hastings	Newcastle Knights	St Helens (Super League)
Jack Hetherington	Newcastle Knights	Melbourne Storm
Kai Pearce-Paul	Newcastle Knights	Wests Tigers
Leo Thompson	Newcastle Knights	Canterbury-Bankstown Bulldogs
Mason Teague	Newcastle Knights	Brisbane Broncos
Tyrone Thompson	Newcastle Knights	Chiefs (Super Rugby)
Bunty Afoa	New Zealand Warriors	Wests Tigers
Tom Ale	New Zealand Warriors	Penrith Panthers
Kalani Going	New Zealand Warriors	Penrith Panthers
Morgan Harper	New Zealand Warriors	Newtown Jets (NSW Cup)
Edward Kosi	New Zealand Warriors	South Sydney Rabbitohs
Moala Graham-Taufa	New Zealand Warriors	South Sydney Rabbitohs
Freddy Lussick	New Zealand Warriors	Penrith Panthers
Karl Lawton	North Queensland Cowboys	Hull Kingston Rovers (Super League)
Jordan McLean	North Queensland Cowboys	Retirement
Reece Robson	North Queensland Cowboys	Sydney Roosters
Semi Valemei	North Queensland Cowboys	Castleford Tigers (Super League)
Tom Duffy	North Queensland Cowboys	Brisbane Broncos
Dylan Brown	Parramatta Eels	Newcastle Knights
Haze Dunster	Parramatta Eels	None
Wiremu Greig	Parramatta Eels	North Queensland Cowboys
Brendan Hands	Parramatta Eels	Toulouse Olympique (Super League)
Dean Hawkins	Parramatta Eels	London Broncos (RFL Championship)
Shaun Lane	Parramatta Eels	Retirement
Zac Lomax	Parramatta Eels	Western Force (Super Rugby)
Joey Lussick	Parramatta Eels	Retirement
Matt Eisenhuth	Penrith Panthers	Retirement
Asu Kepaoa	Penrith Panthers	Newcastle Knights
Daine Laurie	Penrith Panthers	Canberra Raiders
Soni Luke	Penrith Panthers	North Queensland Cowboys
Brad Schneider	Penrith Panthers	Dolphins
David Fale	Penrith Panthers	St. George Illawarra Dragons
Trent Toelau	Penrith Panthers	Melbourne Storm
Luke Sommerton	Penrith Panthers	Gold Coast Titans
Lewis Dodd	South Sydney Rabbitohs	Catalans Dragons (Super League)
Siliva Havili	South Sydney Rabbitohs	London Broncos (RFL Championship)
Jacob Host	South Sydney Rabbitohs	St Helens (Super League)
Shaquai Mitchell	South Sydney Rabbitohs	Tweed Seagulls (Queensland Cup)
Josh Schuster	South Sydney Rabbitohs	Western Suburbs Magpies (NSW Cup)
Davvy Moale	South Sydney Rabbitohs	Melbourne Storm
Corey Allan	St. George Illawarra Dragons	Retirement
Jack de Belin	St. George Illawarra Dragons	Parramatta Eels
Tom Eisenhuth	St. George Illawarra Dragons	Retirement
Raymond Faitala-Mariner	St. George Illawarra Dragons	None
Viliami Fifita	St. George Illawarra Dragons	Manly Warringah Sea Eagles (NSW Cup)
Lachlan Ilias	St. George Illawarra Dragons	Gold Coast Titans
David Klemmer	St. George Illawarra Dragons	St Helens (Super League)
Michael Molo	St. George Illawarra Dragons	Ipswich Jets (Queensland Cup)
Ben Murdoch-Masila	St. George Illawarra Dragons	Retirement
Cody Ramsey	St. George Illawarra Dragons	Sydney Roosters
Mikaele Ravalawa	St. George Illawarra Dragons	Castleford Tigers (Super League)
Sione Finau	St. George Illawarra Dragons	Canberra Raiders
Zach Dockar-Clay	Sydney Roosters	Manly Warringah Sea Eagles
Sandon Smith	Sydney Roosters	Newcastle Knights
Chad Townsend	Sydney Roosters	Retirement
Solomona Faataape	Wests Tigers	Catalans Dragons (Super League)
Justin Matamua	Wests Tigers	Canterbury-Bankstown Bulldogs (NSW Cup)
Brent Naden	Wests Tigers	Thirroul Butchers (Illawarra Rugby League)
Charlie Staines	Wests Tigers	Catalans Dragons (Super League)
Jayden Sullivan	Wests Tigers	South Sydney Rabbitohs
Franklin Pele	Bradford Bulls (Super League)	South Sydney Rabbitohs
Morgan Gannon	Leeds Rhinos (Super League)	New Zealand Warriors
Morgan Knowles	St Helens (Super League)	Dolphins
Matthew Dufty	Warrington Wolves (Super League)	South Sydney Rabbitohs
Patrick Herbert	Dapto Canaries (Illawarra Rugby League)	Wests Tigers

=== Mid-season transfers ===
Player	Original Club	New Club	Date of transfer
Harrison Edwards	North Queensland Cowboys	Parramatta Eels	6 May
Daniel Suluka-Fifita	Canterbury-Bankstown Bulldogs	St Helens (Super League)	26 May
Fletcher Baker	Canterbury-Bankstown Bulldogs	Manly Warringah Sea Eagles	3 June
Oryn Keeley	Dolphins	Melbourne Storm	29 June
Lazarus Vaalepu	Melbourne Storm	Leigh Leopards (Super League)	30 June
Junior Tupou	Sydney Roosters	Wests Tigers	30 June
Luke Laulilii	Wests Tigers	New Zealand Warriors	30 June
Nathan Lawson	St. George Illawarra Dragons	Australia (Rugby sevens)	27 July
Matthew Lodge	North Queensland Cowboys	Leeds Rhinos (Super League)	13 August
Emre Guler	St. George Illawarra Dragons	Wakefield Trinity (Super League)	19 August

=== Coaches ===
Coach	2025 Club	2026 Club
Des Hasler	Gold Coast Titans	None
Adam O'Brien	Newcastle Knights	Canterbury-Bankstown Bulldogs (assistant)
Josh Hannay	Cronulla-Sutherland Sharks (assistant)	Gold Coast Titans
Justin Holbrook	Sydney Roosters (assistant)	Newcastle Knights
