= Joey Walsh (rugby league) =

Australian rugby league player

Personal information
- Full name: Joseph Walsh
- Born: 18 May 2006 (age 20) Sydney, New South Wales, Australia
- Height: 182 cm (6 ft 0 in)
- Weight: 87 kg (13 st 10 lb)

Playing information
- Position: Halfback, Five-eighth
Club
Years	Team	Pld	T	G	FG	P
2025–	Manly Sea Eagles	10	3	0	0	12
- Source: As of 24 October 2026

Joey Walsh (born 18 May 2006) is an Australian rugby league footballer who plays as a halfback for the Manly Warringah Sea Eagles in the National Rugby League (NRL).

== Background ==
Walsh attended High School across the road from Brookvale Oval at the prestigious rugby union school St. Augustine's College playing Fly-Half. He got selected and captained the Australian U18's Union team playing as a Fly-Half. He was previously in the Sydney Roosters system being selected in a NSW Representative team in 2022. Manly beat the Canterbury Bulldogs, the Dolphins and Rugby Australia to the signature for Walsh, signing a three-year deal until 2027.

Walsh is a Narraweena Hawks junior from the Manly District Junior Rugby League and was added to Manly’s Top 30 roster ahead of the 2025 season.

== Career ==
In round 27 2025, Walsh made his NRL debut for Manly against the New Zealand Warriors at 4 Pines Park in Brookvale. Coming off the bench in a 27-26 win.

In round 10 of the 2026 NRL season, Walsh fielded 4 Pines Park against the Brisbane Broncos where in the third minute of the game he scored his maiden try in the NRL

On 24 June 2026, the Manly outfit announced that Walsh had re-signed with the club until the end of 2029.

== Statistics ==
Year	Team	Games	Tries	Pts
2025	Manly	1	0	0
2026	Manly	9	3	12
2027	Manly			
Total		10	3	12
