= Simione Laiafi =

Australian rugby league footballer

Personal information
- Full name: Simione Laiafi
- Born: 23 September 2006 (age 20) Blacktown, New South Wales, Australia
- Height: 191 cm (6 ft 3 in)
- Weight: 116 kg (18 st 4 lb)

Playing information
- Position: Prop
Club
| Years | Team | Pld | T | G | FG | P |
|---|---|---|---|---|---|---|
| 2026– | Manly Sea Eagles | 15 | 0 | 0 | 0 | 0 |

Simione Laiafi (born 23 September 2006) is an Australian professional rugby league footballer who plays as a prop for the Manly Warringah Sea Eagles in the National Rugby League (NRL).

== Early life ==
Laiafi was born in Blacktown, New South Wales. He attended Bass High School and began playing junior rugby league for the Chester Hill Hornets after originally planning to play soccer.

== Playing career ==
=== Early career ===
In 2024, Laiafi represented the Australian Schoolboys team while playing for Bass High School. He advanced through the Sea Eagles' pathway system, appearing in the SG Ball Cup and playing 13 matches in the Jersey Flegg Cup during 2025. Later that year, he made nine senior appearances in the NSW Cup competition.

=== 2026: NRL debut ===
Laiafi was promoted to Manly's Top 30 roster ahead of the 2026 NRL season. He made his first-grade NRL debut for the Manly Warringah Sea Eagles against the Sydney Roosters in Round 4 of the 2026 season on 26 March 2026. On 14 May 2026, the club announced that Laiafi had signed a two-year contract extension, securing him to the club until the end of the 2028 season.
