= Paul Bryan (rugby league) =

Australian rugby league player

Personal information
- Born: 1 January 2003 (age 23) Mackay, Queensland, Australia
- Height: 190 cm (6 ft 3 in)
- Weight: 100 kg (15 st 10 lb)

Playing information
- Position: Prop
Club
Years	Team	Pld	T	G	FG	P
2025	Newcastle Knights	1	0	0	0	0
2026	Manly Sea Eagles	2	0	0	0	0
	Total	3	0	0	0	0
- Source: As of 26 March 2026

Paul Bryan (born 1 January 2003) is an Australian professional rugby league footballer who last played as a prop for the Manly Warringah Sea Eagles in the National Rugby League.

== Background ==
Born in Mackay, Queensland, Bryan played his junior rugby league for the Brothers Bulldogs, before being signed by the North Queensland Cowboys as a 15-year-old.

== Playing career ==
=== Early years ===
In 2021, Bryan played for the Mackay Cutters in the Mal Meninga Cup, Hastings Deering Colts and Queensland Cup competitions.

In 2022, Bryan joined the Newcastle Knights, playing SG Ball Cup and Jersey Flegg Cup before moving up to their NRL top 30 squad in 2024.

=== 2025 ===
In Round 12 of the 2025 NRL season, Bryan made his NRL debut for Newcastle against the Penrith Panthers. He dislocated his shoulder in his first tackle of the match, but went on to play 19 minutes.

On 30 June, it was announced that Bryan was involved in a swap deal, moving to the Manly Warringah Sea Eagles, while Jake Arthur joined the Newcastle outfit.

=== 2026 ===
In September 2026, Bryan was released by the Manly club along with eleven other players.
