= Kobe Hetherington =

Australian rugby league footballer

Personal information
- Born: 11 March 1999 (age 27) Sydney, New South Wales, Australia
- Height: 184 cm (6 ft 0 in)
- Weight: 95 kg (14 st 13 lb)

Playing information
- Position: Lock, Prop
Club
Years	Team	Pld	T	G	FG	P
2021–25	Brisbane Broncos	105	6	0	0	24
2026–	Manly Sea Eagles	17	1	0	0	4
	Total	122	7	0	0	28
Representative
Years	Team	Pld	T	G	FG	P
2024	Prime Minister's XIII	1	0	0	0	0
- Source: As of 26 July 2026
- Father: Jason Hetherington

Kobe Hetherington (born 11 March 1999) is an Australian professional rugby league footballer who plays as a lock forward for the Manly Warringah Sea Eagles in the National Rugby League.

He previously played for the Brisbane Broncos with whom he won the 2025 NRL Grand Final.

== Background ==
Hetherington was born in Sydney, New South Wales, Australia and was raised in Rockhampton, Queensland. His father Jason is a former Australian international and Queensland representative.

He played his junior rugby league for the Rockhampton Brothers, Calliope Roosters and Gladstone Brothers.

Hetherington attended The Cathedral College before being signed by the Brisbane Broncos.

== Playing career ==
=== Early career ===
In 2015, Hetherington played for the Central Queensland Capras in the Cyril Connell Cup before moving up to their Mal Meninga Cup side in 2016. In 2017, he moved to Brisbane, playing for the Norths Devils in the Mal Meninga Cup and the Broncos in the NRL Under-20s competition.

In 2018 and 2019, he played for the Devils' Hastings Deering Colts side, captaining them in their 2018 Grand Final win over the Townsville Blackhawks. On 10 July 2019, he represented the Queensland under-20 team.

In 2020, Hetherington joined the Broncos' NRL squad on a development contract.

=== 2021 ===
Hetherington began the 2021 season playing for the Souths Logan Magpies in the Queensland Cup. In Round 11 of the 2021 NRL season, Hetherington made his first grade debut for Brisbane against the Sydney Roosters in a 34-16 win. With only two first grade games, Hetherington scored his first try in the NRL against Melbourne at Suncorp Stadium. In round 14, Hetherington was controversially sent off in Brisbane's 38-16 loss against the Canberra Raiders, Hetherington was later cleared and wasn't suspended from the incident. In Round 16, Hetherington started his first NRL game at lock against the Cronulla-Sutherland Sharks in a 26-18 win. On the 7 July, Hetherington re-signed for two years remaining at the Brisbane Broncos till the end of 2023. Hetherington was awarded Rookie of the Year for the 2021 season at the Brisbane end of season awards.

=== 2022 ===
Hetherington made a total of 22 appearances for Brisbane in the 2022 NRL season as the club finished 9th on the table and missed the finals. Only missed two games due to testing positive for Covid in Round 1, and failing HIA protocols missing Round 25.

=== 2023 ===
Hetherington played 19 games for Brisbane in the 2023 NRL season. Hetherington played in Brisbane's 26-24 loss against Penrith in the 2023 NRL Grand Final.

=== 2024 ===
Hetherington played 23 matches for Brisbane in the 2024 NRL season which saw the club miss the finals finishing 12th on the table.

=== 2025 ===
On 23 July, the Brisbane outfit announced that Hetherington signed a one year extension. On 8 September 2025, it was reported that Hetherington had signed a four year deal with Manly Warringah Sea Eagles. Hours later Hetherington's manager confirmed the deal, as Hetherington's partner had secured a job in Sydney and Manly offered him a deal which he accepted. On 5 October, Hetherington won the 2025 NRL grand final with the Brisbane club in a 26-22 win over the Melbourne Storm which turned out to be his final game for the team. On 21 October, Manly officially announced the signing of Hetherington.

=== 2026 ===
Hetherington played 17 games for Manly in the 2026 NRL season as the club finished 9th on the table.

== Statistics ==
Year	Team	Games	Tries	Pts
2021	Brisbane Broncos	14	3	12
2022	Brisbane Broncos	22		
2023	Brisbane Broncos	19		
2024	Brisbane Broncos	23	1	4
2025	Brisbane Broncos	27	2	8
2026	Manly Warringah Sea Eagles	17	1	4
	Totals	122	7	28

== Honours ==
Club

- NRL Grand Finalist: 2023, 2025
- NRL Pre-Season Challenge Winner: 2024, 2025
- NRL Premiership: 2025

Representative

- PM's XIII Test Champion: 2024
