= Josh Feledy =

PNG international rugby league footballer

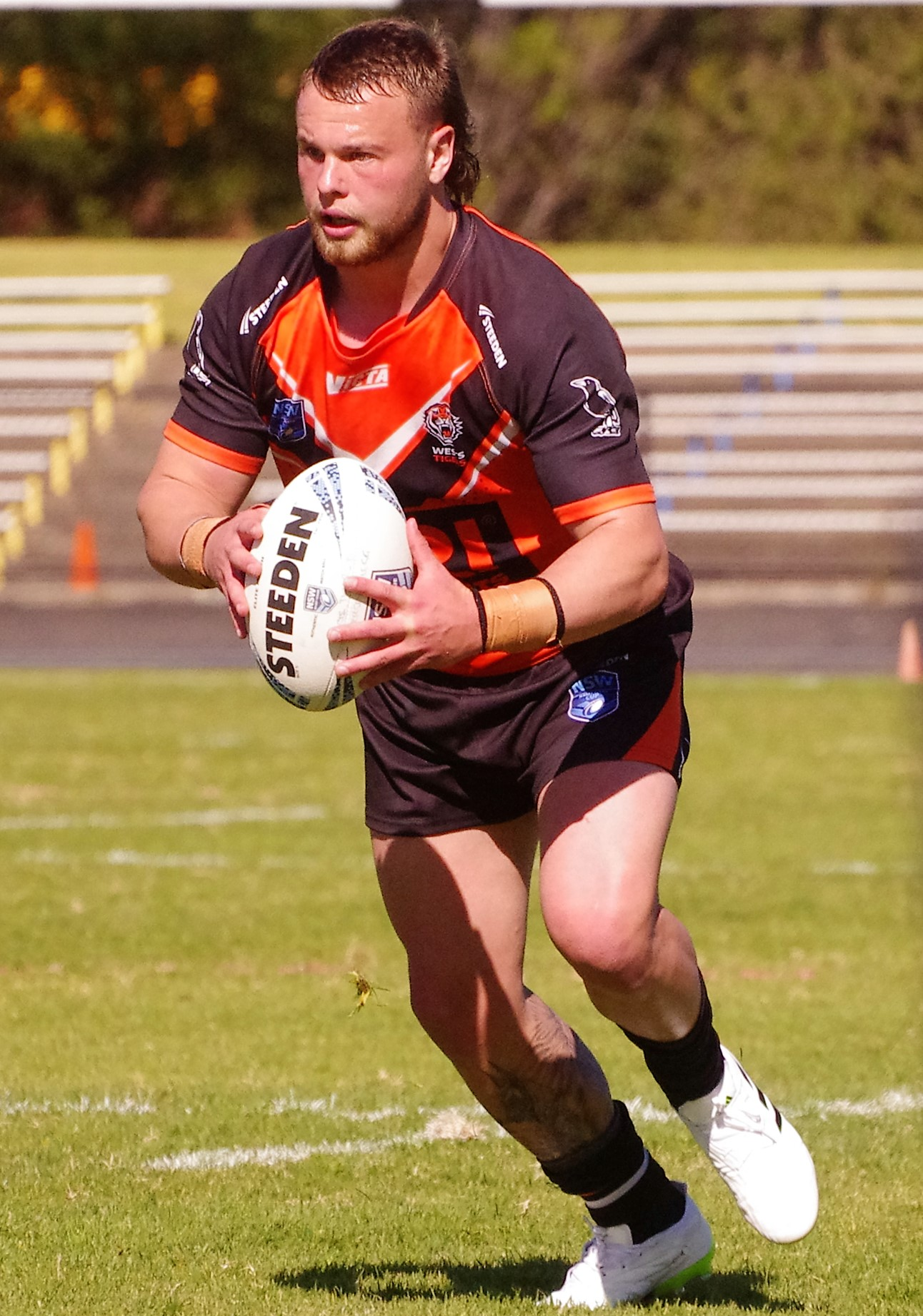

Personal information
- Born: 7 September 2004 (age 22) Sydney, New South Wales, Australia
- Height: 180 cm (5 ft 11 in)
- Weight: 91 kg (14 st 5 lb)

Playing information
- Position: Centre
Club
Years	Team	Pld	T	G	FG	P
2023–25	Wests Tigers	3	1	0	0	4
2026–	Manly-Warringah Sea Eagles	12	5	0	0	20
	Total	15	6	0	0	24
Representative
Years	Team	Pld	T	G	FG	P
2026	Papua New Guinea	1	0	0	0	0
- Source: As of 30 October 2026

Josh Feledy is an Australian rugby league footballer who plays as a centre for the Manly-Warringah Sea Eagles in the National Rugby League (NRL).

== Playing career ==
=== 2023 & 2024 ===
Feledy made his NRL debut in Round 27 against the Manly Warringah Sea Eagles in a 54–12 loss. He has been also selected for the State of Origin Under 19s representing New South Wales. Feledy only made two appearances for the Wests Tigers during the 2024 NRL season. Feledy would spend most of the year with Western Suburbs in the NSW Cup where he would score 14 tries in 20 games.

=== 2025 ===
Feledy made no appearances for the Wests Tigers in the 2025 NRL season. Feledy would instead play for Western Suburbs in the NSW Cup. On 30 September, Feledy was released by the Wests Tigers after not being offered a new contract.

=== 2026 ===
On 7 July, the Sea Eagles announced that Feledy had re-signed with the club for a further two years.

He made his Papua New Guinea international début in the 2026 Rugby League World Cup 34-12 defeat to England on 30 October 2026.
