= Onitoni Large =

Australian rugby league footballer

Personal information
- Full name: Onitoni Large
- Born: 13 August 2007 (age 19) Campbelltown, New South Wales, Australia
- Height: 180 cm (5 ft 11 in)
- Weight: 83 kg (183 lb; 13 st 1 lb)

Playing information
- Position: Five-eighth, Halfback
Club
Years	Team	Pld	T	G	FG	P
2026	Manly Warringah Sea Eagles	1	0	0	0	0
Representative
Years	Team	Pld	T	G	FG	P
2026–2026	New South Wales U19	1	0	0	0	0
- Source: Manly Sea Eagles Profile As of 29 August 2026

Onitoni Large (born 13 August 2007) is an Australian professional rugby league footballer who plays as a five-eighth or halfback for the Manly Warringah Sea Eagles in the NRL.

== Background ==
Large was born in Campbelltown, New South Wales. He is of Tongan, Indian, and Australian heritage. He attended The Scots College in Sydney, where he captained the Junior Wallabies in rugby union before committing to rugby league.

== Playing career ==
=== Early career ===
Large played his early junior rugby league alongside his brother, Ashton for the Campbelltown City Kangaroos before progressing into the Wests Tigers pathway system, representing their Harold Matthews Cup team in 2024. He subsequently signed a three-year contract with the Manly Warringah Sea Eagles.

Large's 2025 season with Manly's SG Ball team was cut short due to a season-ending shoulder injury after playing just four matches. He returned in 2026 to transition into senior football via the New South Wales Cup, making his debut for Blacktown Workers (Manly's feeder club) on 17 May 2026 against the South Sydney Rabbitohs. He scored 3 tries across 10 NSW Cup appearances.

=== 2026: NRL debut ===
On 18 June 2026, Large represented the New South Wales Under-19 team against Queensland Under-19s at North Sydney Oval.

Large made his first-grade NRL debut for the Manly Warringah Sea Eagles on 28 August 2026 against the St. George Illawarra Dragons (Round 26), coming off the interchange bench in a critical match for Manly's finals qualifications.

== Statistics ==
=== NRL ===
Year	Team	Games	Tries	Goals	FG	Pts
2026	Manly Warringah Sea Eagles	1	0	0	0	0
Career total		1	0	0	0	0
