= Jackson Shereb =

Australian rugby league player (born 2002)

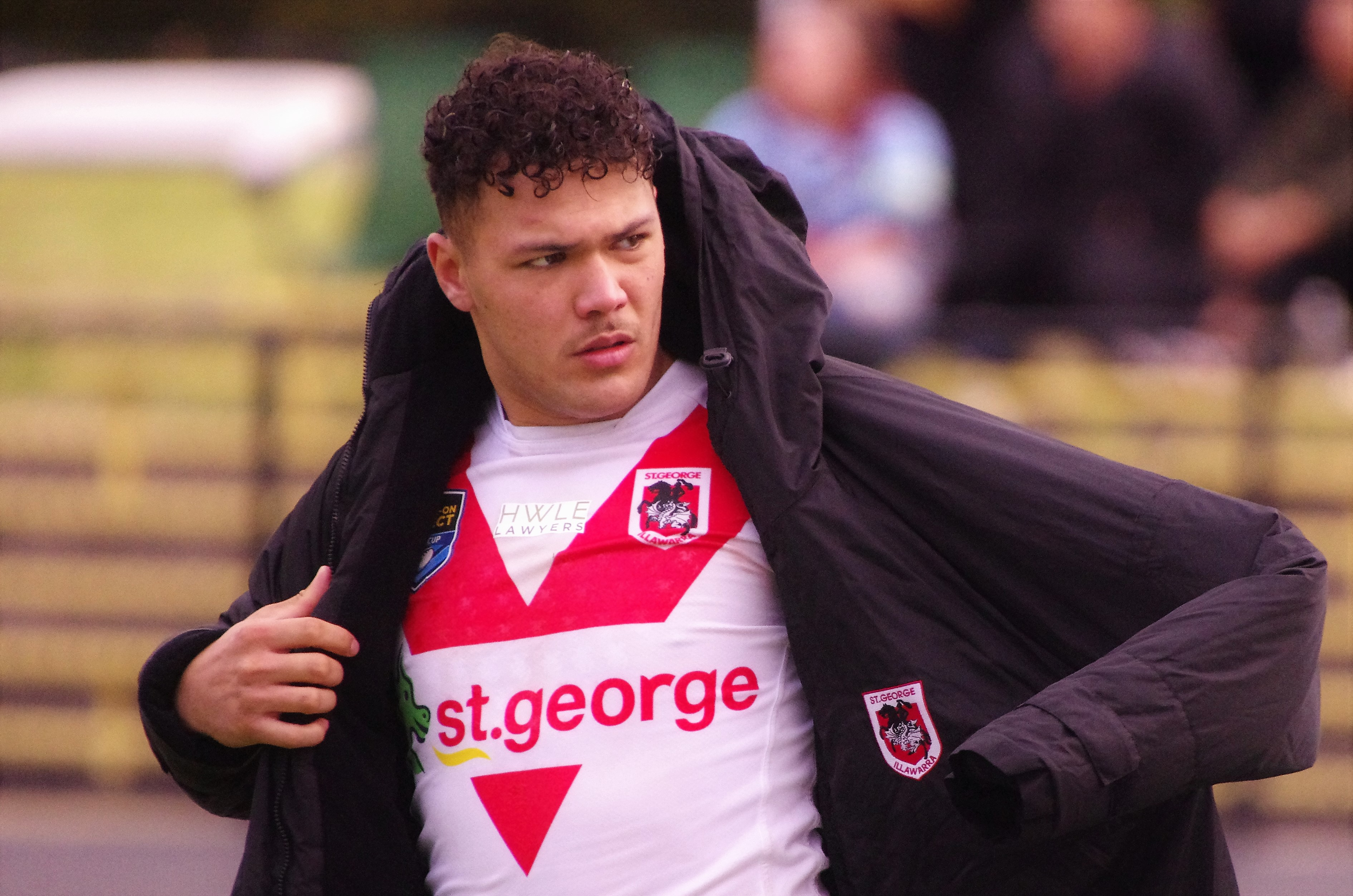

Personal information
- Full name: Jackson Shereb
- Born: 6 February 2002 (age 24) Katoomba, New South Wales, Australia
- Height: 187 cm (6 ft 2 in)
- Weight: 100 kg (15 st 10 lb)

Playing information
- Position: Second-row
Club
Years	Team	Pld	T	G	FG	P
2026–	Manly Sea Eagles	4	0	0	0	0
- As of 22 November 2026

Jackson Shereb (born 6 February 2002) is an Australian professional rugby league footballer who plays as a second-row forward for the Manly Warringah Sea Eagles in the National Rugby League (NRL).

== Playing career ==
Jackson Shereb came through the St. George Illawarra Dragons pathways system, progressing through the club's junior competitions before playing in the NSW Cup. He later joined the Norths Devils in the Queensland Cup for the 2025 season, helping the club reach the Grand Final. Following his time with Norths Devils, Shereb joined the Manly Warringah Sea Eagles on a two-year deal. He made his NRL debut for Manly in Round 10 of the 2026 season against the Brisbane Broncos.
