= Caleb Navale =

Fiji international rugby league footballer

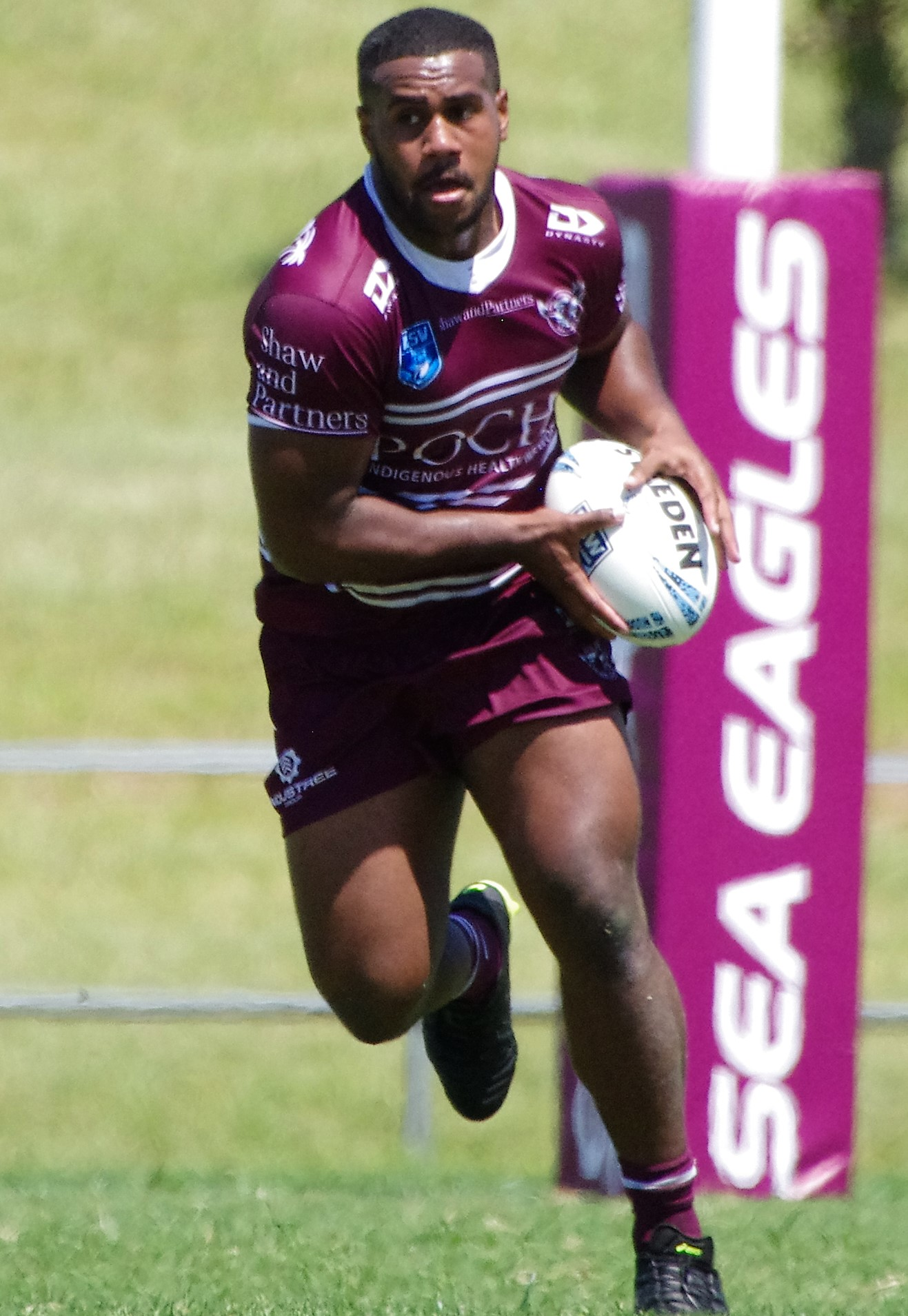

Personal information
- Full name: Caleb Navale
- Born: 8 May 2003 (age 23) Auburn, New South Wales, Australia
- Height: 178 cm (5 ft 10 in)
- Weight: 100 kg (15 st 10 lb)

Playing information
- Position: Lock
Club
Years	Team	Pld	T	G	FG	P
2024–	Manly Sea Eagles	12	2	0	0	8
Representative
Years	Team	Pld	T	G	FG	P
2023–	Fiji	10	3	0	0	12
- Source: As of 31 October 2026
- Father: Eparama Navale

Caleb Navale (born 8 May 2003) is a Fiji international rugby league footballer who plays as a lock forward for the Manly Warringah Sea Eagles in the National Rugby League.

== Background ==
Navale is the son of former Parramatta Eels and Northern Eagles winger Eparama Navale.

== Playing career ==
Navale played his junior football for Orange CYMS before being signed by the St. George Illawarra Dragons Navale moved to Manly in 2022, being a part of their Jersey Flegg team. In Round 16 2024, Navale made his NRL debut for Manly against the South Sydney Rabbitohs coming off the bench in a 14–0 loss. Navale re-signed with Manly until the end of 2027.

On 11 February 2026, the Sea Eagles announced that Navale tore his ACL at training and would be ruled out for six months.

=== Representative ===
Navale was selected for Fiji for the 2023 Pacific Championship series against Papua New Guinea and Cook Islands Navale made his Fiji International debut against Cook Islands in a 22–18 win. Navale was selected again for Fiji for the 2024 Pacific Championship.

He scored a try in the 48-24 Pacific Championships Bowl win over Cook Islands on 18 October 2025 in Port Moresby.
