= Luke Brooks =

Australian rugby league footballer

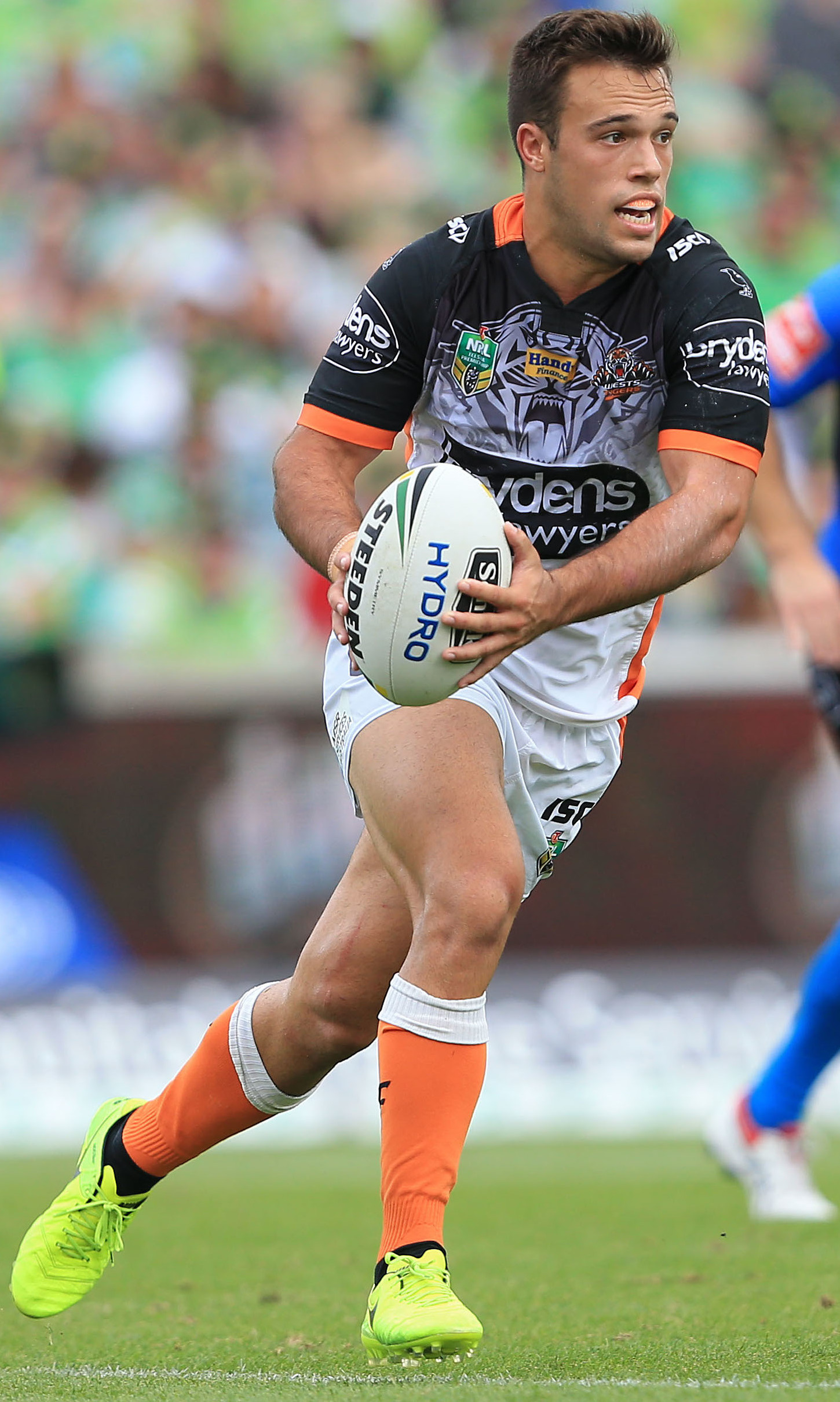

Personal information
- Born: 21 December 1994 (age 31) Sydney, New South Wales, Australia
- Height: 180 cm (5 ft 11 in)
- Weight: 88 kg (13 st 12 lb)

Playing information
- Position: Halfback, Five-eighth
Club
Years	Team	Pld	T	G	FG	P
2013–23	Wests Tigers	205	45	23	7	233
2024–	Manly Sea Eagles	65	11	0	0	44
	Total	270	56	23	7	277
Representative
Years	Team	Pld	T	G	FG	P
2015	NRL All Stars	1	0	0	0	0
2024	Prime Minister's XIII	1	0	0	0	0
- Source: As of 27 June 2026

Luke Brooks (born 21 December 1994) is an Australian professional rugby league footballer who plays as a five-eighth for the Manly Warringah Sea Eagles in the National Rugby League (NRL).

He previously played for the Wests Tigers in the NRL mainly as a halfback. He represented the NRL All Stars in 2015 and the Prime Minister's XIII in 2024.

== Background ==
Brooks was born in Sydney, New South Wales, Australia.

He played his junior football for the Holy Cross Rhinos and Leichhardt Wanderers before being signed by the Wests Tigers. In 2012 he played for the Australian Schoolboys and also played in the Balmain Tigers' S. G. Ball Cup Grand Final win over the Canberra Raiders. Brooks played in the final alongside former Tigers teammate Mitchell Moses.

== Playing career ==
=== 2013 ===
Having spent the pre-season training with the first-grade team, Brooks was receiving attention in the press, with Andrew Johns saying he was one of the best young talents he had seen in some time. Playing for the Tigers' NYC team, in April, he played for the New South Wales U20s State of Origin team.

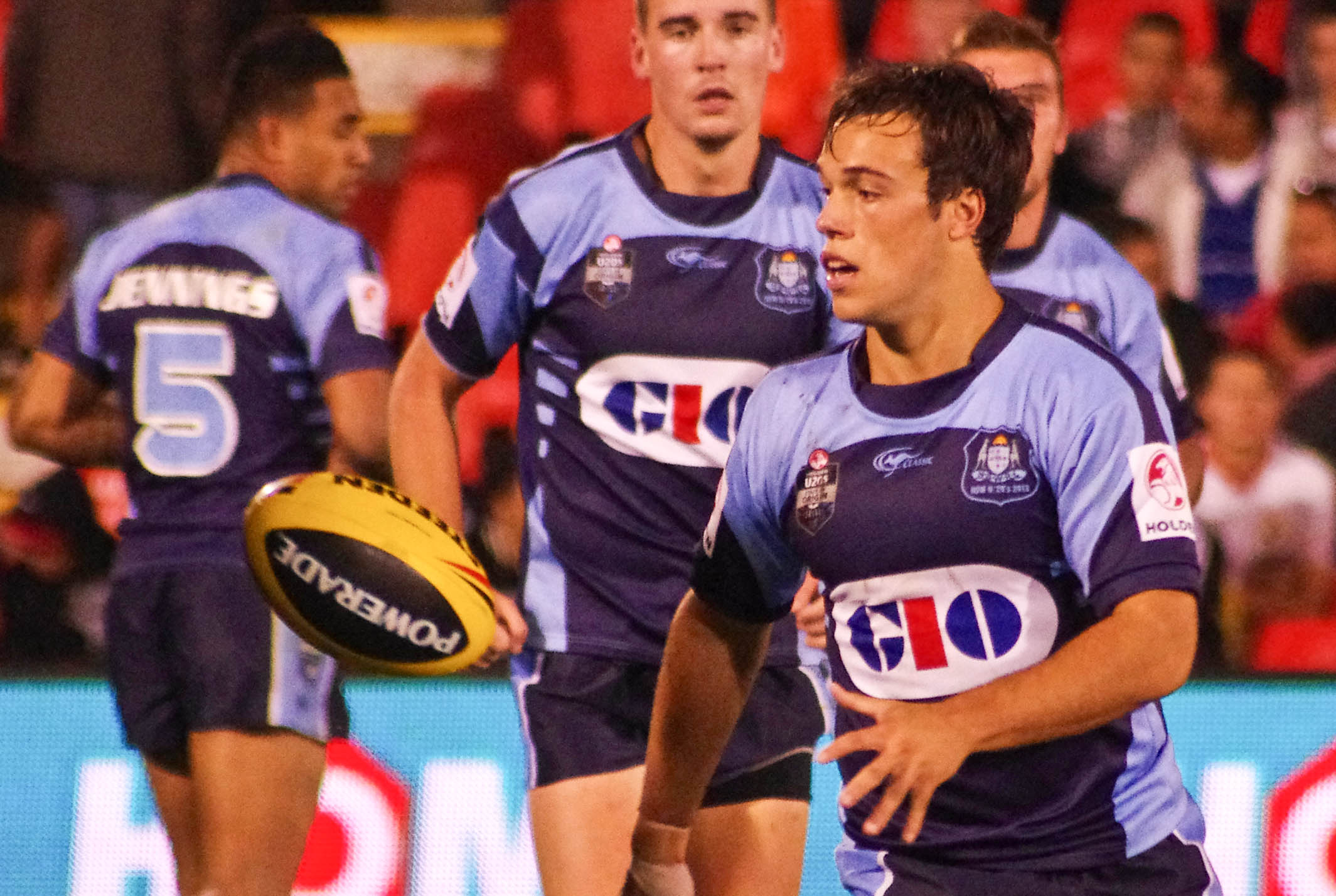
Brooks with the NSW Under-20s in 2013

On 29 July, he re-signed with Wests Tigers on a 4-year contract.

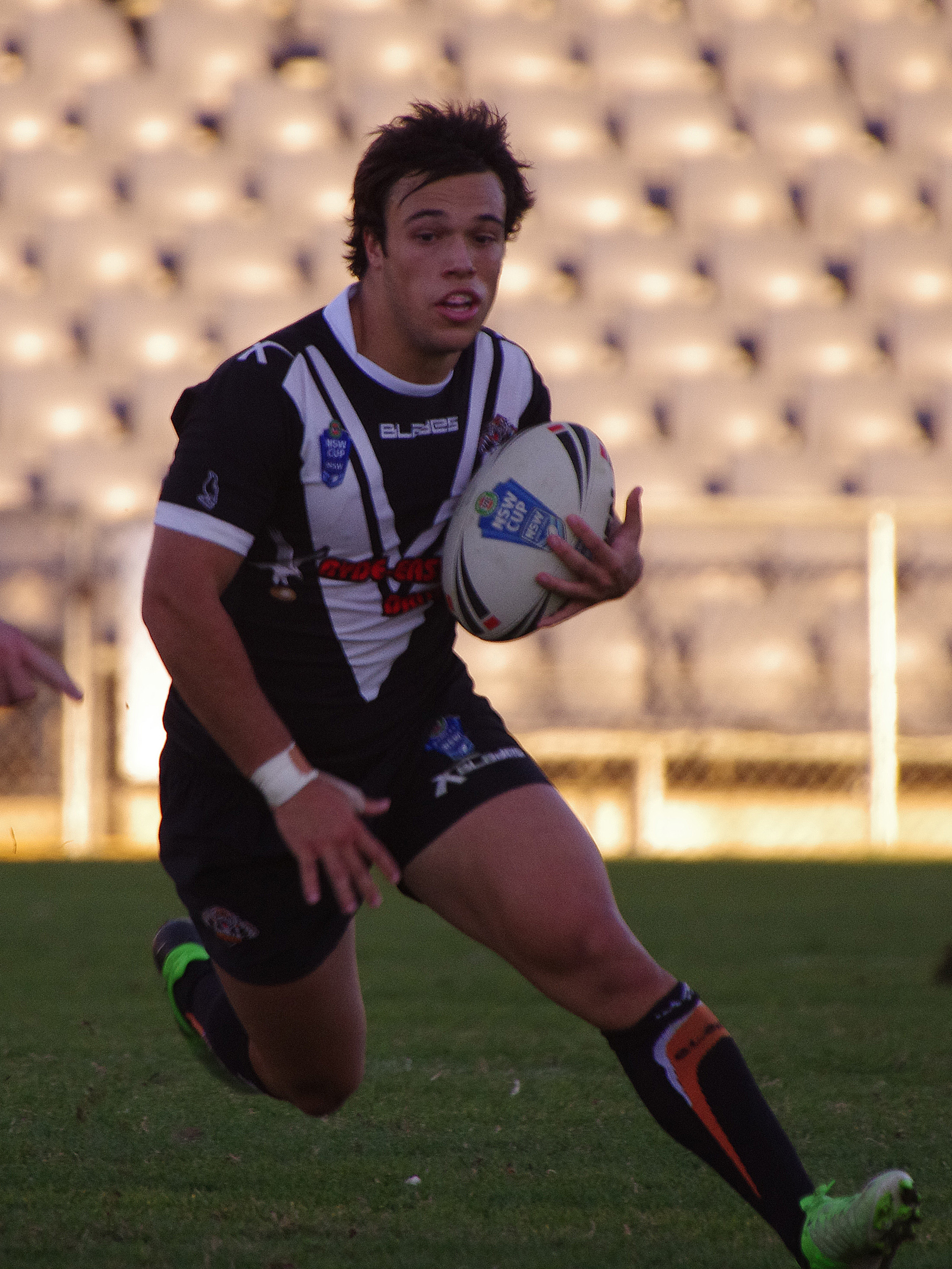
Brooks playing for the Tigers in 2013

In Round 24 of the 2013, Brooks made his NRL debut for the Wests Tigers against the St. George Illawarra Dragons. Although the Wests Tigers had exceeded their second tier salary cap, Brooks was given a special dispensation to play as neither team could make the semi-finals. Brooks scored a try and was awarded Man of the Match in the Tigers 34–18 victory, in what was described as, "a stunning NRL debut." The salary cap prevented Brooks from playing in any further games that year. At the end of the year, Brooks was named at halfback in the 2013 NYC Team of the Year.

=== 2014 ===
Brooks became the Wests Tigers regular halfback for the 2014 season.

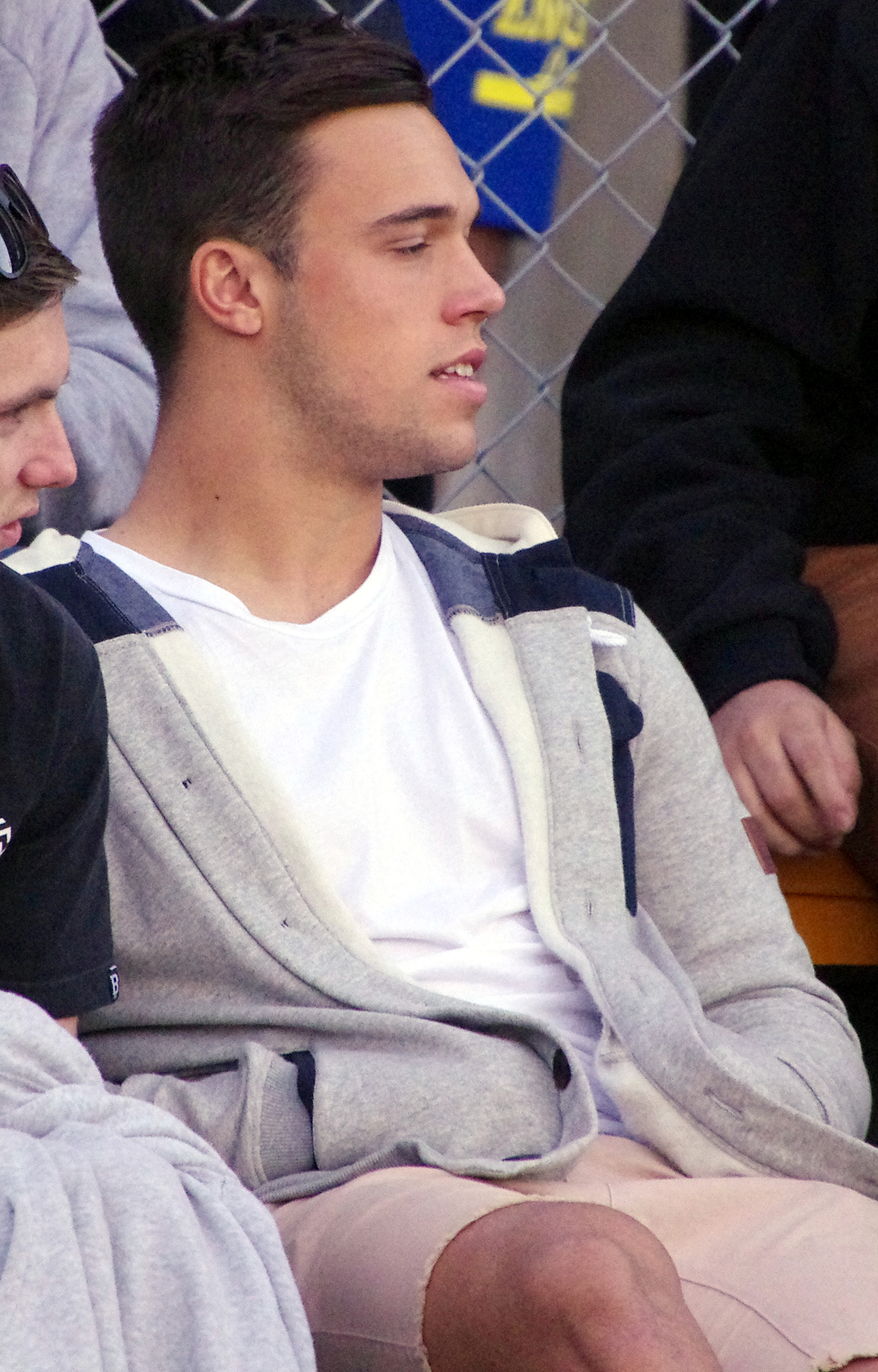
Brooks watching a rugby league match in 2014

He played in 21 matches, scoring 6 tries and kicking 1 field goal. He was named 2014 Dally M Rookie of the Year.

=== 2015 ===
In 2015, Brooks was selected on the interchange bench for the NRL All Stars in the 2015 All Stars match, the youngest player to ever take part in the game. In the first half, he came on and played right centre. In the second half, he played five-eighth when Kieran Foran left the field injured. The Indigenous All Stars won 20–6.

Brooks finished the year with a personal best 10 tries from 23 appearances, the 5th highest amongst NRL halves. His 16 try assists were also the 5th most in the entire NRL for the year.

=== 2016 ===
At the start of the season, Brooks had an option on his contract for 2017. Despite some offers from rival clubs and an attempt from the Wests Tigers to extend his contract, Brooks took up the option mid-season. He said, "My manager was in talks with a few clubs but it didn't come to anything and I was just happy to take an extension."

With Wests Tigers struggling for wins mid-season, Brooks received some criticism from commentators such as Peter Sterling for his lack of involvement in games. Andrew Johns said, "He has to give his team more. He has got a lot of raps. There is talk he isn't behind forwards going forward but he has to get his hands on the ball more … I don't get it." Brooks' season was the hampered by a knee injury towards the end of the season, but the team recovered to be one win away from a semi-final berth. He later admitted, "I wasn't playing my best footy." Brooks scored 5 tries from his 21 games for the year.

=== 2017 ===
In March and April, Brooks, alongside Tigers captain Aaron Woods, halves partner Mitchell Moses and superstar fullback James Tedesco, attracted media speculation about where the players, dubbed the "Big Four" would play after all of their contracts with the Tigers were set to expire at season's end. On 18 April, Brooks extended his stay at the club to the end of the 2019 season, the only player of the group to re-sign. At the time, Brooks was sidelined from the game for 4 weeks due a hamstring injury. He made his return in Round 8, having a great match, leading the team and setting up the winning try for Kevin Naiqama in the Tigers 18-12 thrilling win.

=== 2018 ===
With Wests Tigers winning 5 of their first 6 games, Brooks was described as the most improved player at the club. "The 23-year-old looks a completely different player this year – stronger, faster and fitter, exploding with confidence, running the ball more than ever before. His average run metres have shot from 75 to 106 so far and his eight drop outs forced in six games has already equalled his entire 2017 tally of eight in 17 games. His 20 tackle busts is just two short of his 22 busts in 2017 as well." Elsewhere it was said he, "looks more confident and assured, is defending better, making better decisions and running the ball more."

Brooks was one of two players who appeared in all 24 games for the Tigers, scoring 5 tries and kicking 2 field goals. At the Dally M Awards, Brooks placed third overall, and was named the competition's Halfback of the Year. On 3 December, Brooks re-signed with the Wests Tigers for 5 years. Keeping him at the club till the end of the 2023 season.

=== 2019 ===
By round 24, Brooks held the statistic of the current player with the most NRL caps to not have played finals football, a record that would continue with Wests Tigers finishing ninth. Brooks finished the season making 24 appearances and scored 4 tries.

=== 2020 ===
In round 14 against Canterbury-Bankstown, Brooks kicked a field goal with two minutes remaining on to win the game for Wests 29–28 at Western Sydney Stadium.

In round 18, Brooks was sent to the sin bin for punching Souths player Dane Gagai. He later returned to the field and scored a try in Wests 26–24 loss.

Brooks played 17 games for the Wests Tigers in the 2020 NRL season as the club finished 11th and missed the finals.

=== 2021 ===
In round 2 of the 2021 NRL season, he played his 150th first grade game as the Wests Tigers lost 40–6 against the Sydney Roosters at Campbelltown Stadium.

Brooks played a total of 24 games for the Wests Tigers in the 2021 NRL season as the club finished 13th and missed the finals.

=== 2022 ===
With Wests Tigers losing the first five games of the season, Brooks was named at five-eighth in round 6 with Jackson Hastings playing halfback. Brooks said the change was to, "get me running the ball a bit more. I'll let Jacko play that first receiver and traditional halfback, and I'll play off the back of him. I think I play my best footy when I'm running the ball. I feel like I haven't really done that the last few weeks."

The first game after the switch was a 21–20 win over Parramatta, described as an early contender for upset of the season. Brooks contributed two try-assists and two line-break-assists, with the commentators saying, "it's been a masterstroke so far from the coach moving Luke Brooks. If you had to rate the Hastings 6 and Brooks 7 combination well that's an A+." The next week, he kicked a field goal with one minute remaining against South Sydney to win the game for Wests Tigers 23–22. Brooks played a total of 17 matches for the Wests Tigers in the 2022 NRL season as the club finished bottom of the table and claimed the Wooden Spoon for the first time.

=== 2023 ===
In round 9 of the 2023 NRL season, Brooks earned his first victory in over a year as the Wests Tigers upset Penrith 12–8. It was Wests first win of the season having lost the previous seven matches and also their first victory in 273 days. On 26 June, Brooks signed a four-year deal to join Manly starting in 2024. Brooks played a total of 16 matches for the Wests Tigers in the 2023 NRL season and scored three tries as they finished with the wooden spoon for a second consecutive season.

=== 2024 ===
Brooks made his club debut for Manly in the round 1 opening match in Las Vegas, scoring a try during Manly's 36–24 victory over South Sydney. After 229 NRL games, Brooks would finally play his first finals game, in an elimination final against the Canterbury-Bankstown Bulldogs. Brooks and Manly would go on to win 24-22. The following week, he played in the clubs semi-final loss against the Sydney Roosters.

=== 2025 ===
Brooks played every game for Manly in the 2025 NRL season as the club finished 10th on the table.

=== 2026 ===
Brooks during round 17 of the 2026 season tore his ACL and played on for a further 15 minutes.

== Statistics ==
Year	Team	Games	Tries	Goals	FGs	Points
2013	Wests Tigers	1	1			4
2014	Wests Tigers	21	6		1	25
2015	Wests Tigers	23	10			40
2016	Wests Tigers	21	5			20
2017	Wests Tigers	17	4		1	17
2018	Wests Tigers	24	5			22
2019	Wests Tigers	24	4			16
2020	Wests Tigers	17	4		1	17
2021	Wests Tigers	24	1	7		18
2022	Wests Tigers	17	2	13	1	35
2023	Wests Tigers	16	3	3	3	19
2024	Manly Warringah Sea Eagles	26	5			20
2025	Manly Warringah Sea Eagles	24	4			16
2026	Manly Warringah Sea Eagles	17	2			8
2027	Manly Warringah Sea Eagles					
	Totals	270	56	23	7	277

source;
