= Clayton Faulalo =

Samoa international rugby league footballer

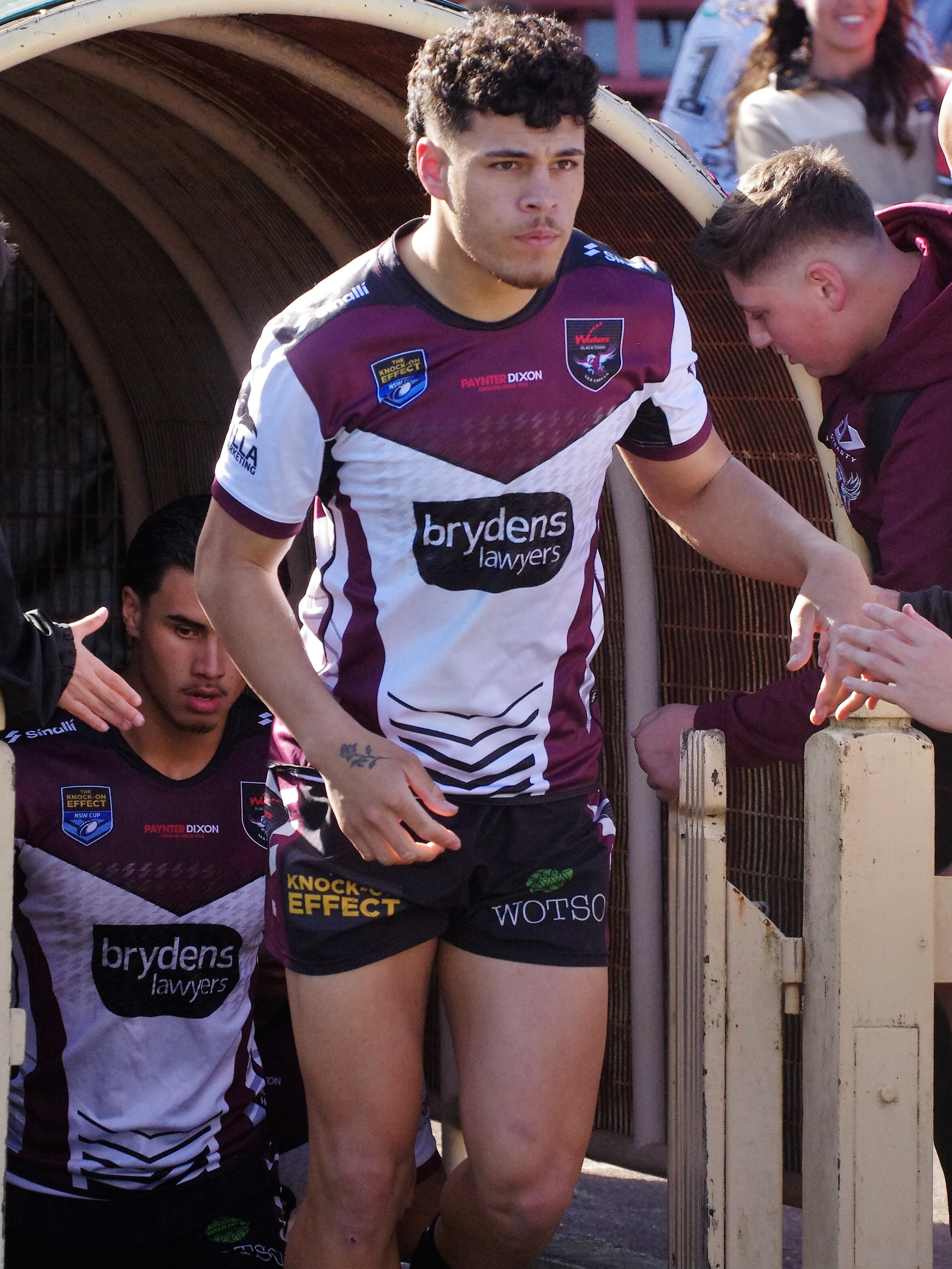

Personal information
- Full name: Clayton Faulalo
- Born: 26 May 2000 (age 26) Penrith, New South Wales, Australia
- Height: 188 cm (6 ft 2 in)
- Weight: 92 kg (14 st 7 lb)

Playing information
- Position: Fullback, Centre, Five-eighth
Club
Years	Team	Pld	T	G	FG	P
2024–	Manly Sea Eagles	25	14	0	0	56
Representative
Years	Team	Pld	T	G	FG	P
2026	Samoa	1	0	0	0	0
- Source: As of 8 November 2026

Clayton Faulalo (born 26 May 2000) is a rugby league footballer who plays as a fullback, centre or five-eighth for the Manly Warringah Sea Eagles in the NRL.

== Playing career ==
=== Parramatta Eels ===
In 2021, Faulalo played for the Parramatta Eels Jersey Flegg side.

=== Blacktown Workers ===
In 2023, Faulalo played for Manly's reserve grade side the Blacktown Workers in the NSW Cup where he scored 29 tries in 24 games, he was the leading try scorer for the season and was awarded the Players' Player award for his efforts. On 23 September, Faulalo was named in the NSW Cup Team of the Year.

=== Manly-Warringah Sea Eagles ===
In November, Faulalo signed a two-year deal with Manly.

In January 2024, Faulalo was elevated into Manly's Top 30 squad. On 14 July 2024, Faulalo made his NRL debut Manly's 44–6 win against the Newcastle Knights in round 19.

In February 2025, Faulalo played in Manly's pre-season match against South Sydney. On 13 August, Manly announced that Faulalo had re-signed with the team until the end of 2027. On 19 June 2026, Manly announced that Faulalo had re-signed until the end of 2029.

=== Representative ===
He made his Samoa international début in the 44-12 defeat to Australia on 8 November 2024 in the 2026 Rugby League World Cup.
