= 2023 Wests Tigers season =

NRL rugby league season

- NRL Rank: 17th (Wooden spooners)
- Play-off result: DNQ
- 2023 record: Wins: 4; losses: 20
- Points scored: For: 385; against: 675

Team information
- CEO: Justin Pascoe
- Head Coach: Tim Sheen
- Captain: Apisai Koroisau
- Stadium: CommBank Stadium (30,000 – 2 Games); Leichhardt Oval (20,000 – 3 Games); Campbelltown Stadium (17,500 – 3 Games)
- Avg. attendance: 12,994
- High attendance: 28,611 (Round 6)
- Low attendance: 12,247 (Round 12)

Top scorers
- Tries: Starford To'a (7)
- Goals: Brandon Wakeham(30)
- Points: Brandon Wakeham (68)
← 2022	List of seasons	2024 →

The 2023 Wests Tigers season was the 24th in the club's history. They competed in the National Rugby League's 2023 Telstra Premiership. Head coach Tim Sheens returned to the role following his appointment in July 2022. Sheens had previously coached the club from 2003 to 2012. Joining Sheens as assistant coaches were former West Tigers players Benji Marshall and Robbie Farah.

The West Tigers became wooden spooners for the second year in a row, which was their second spoon in club history.

== Season summary ==
- Pre-Season Challenge – The club would begin the season poorly, suffering a heavy defeat in the first trial match against the New Zealand Warriors in Auckland. However they would bounce back against the Canberra Raiders in the second trial match to win 36–4 in hot conditions at the Belmore Sports Ground, with coach Tim Sheens happy with his team's defence.
- Round 9 – Wests Tigers end a 273 day, 12-match losing streak stretching back into last season, upsetting reigning champions Penrith Panthers 12–8 in torrential rain at Carrington Park in Bathurst.
- Round 16 – Alex Twal scores his first NRL try after 116 matches for the Wests Tigers, ending one of the longest try-less streaks in competition history. Twal's try was the Tigers only four-pointer in the 28–6 loss to the Melbourne Storm.

== 2023 squad ==
Wests Tigers 2023 squad
Top 30 squad - 2023 NRL season			Development players	Coaching staff
John Bateman – SR, LK; Shawn Blore – SR; Luke Brooks – HB; Jahream Bula – FB; Adam Doueihi – FE, FB; Sione Fainu – PR; Asu Kepaoa – CE, SR, WG; David Klemmer – PR; Apisai Koroisau (c) – HK, HB; Daine Laurie – FE, FB	Justin Matamua – LK; Brent Naden – CE; Rua Ngatikaura – HK; David Nofoaluma – WG; Isaiah Papali'i – SR; Fonua Pole – LK, PR; Triston Reilly – CE, WG; Apisalome Saukuru – SR; Alex Seyfarth – PR, SR; Jake Simpkin – HK	Tuki Simpkins – PR; Charlie Staines – WG, FB; Tommy Talau – CE; Starford To'a – CE, FE; Brandon Tumeth – SR; Junior Tupou – WG; Alex Twal – PR, LK; Stefano Utoikamanu – PR; Brandon Wakeham – FE, HB	Josh Feledy – CE; Christian Ma'anaima – PR; Brandon Mansfield – SR; Extended squad: Tallyn Da Silva – HK; Aitasi James – PR; Kit Laulili'i – LK; Will Smith – FE, HB	Head coach: Tim Sheens; Assistant coaches: Benji Marshall; Robbie Farah; David Furner; Wayne Lambkin (NSW Cup Coach); Peter Moussa (Head of High Performance); Legend: (c) Captain(s); (vc) Vice-captain(s); Updated: 3 March 2023; Source(s): Tigers team profiles, 2023 season

== Player movement ==
These movements happened across the previous season, off-season and pre-season.

Gains

Player/Coach	Previous club	Length
Apisai Koroisau	Penrith Panthers	2024
Isaiah Papali'i	Parramatta Eels	2025
Triston Reilly	New South Wales Waratahs	2024
David Nofoaluma	Melbourne Storm (loan return)	2025
Charlie Staines	Penrith Panthers	2023
David Klemmer	Newcastle Knights	2025
John Bateman	Wigan Warriors	2026
Will Smith	Hull F.C.	N/A
Brandon Wakeham	Canterbury-Bankstown Bulldogs	2023

Losses

Player/Coach	New Club
Luke Garner	Penrith Panthers
Kelma Tuilagi	Manly Warringah Sea Eagles
Zane Musgrove	St. George Illawarra Dragons
Jock Madden	Brisbane Broncos
James Tamou	North Queensland Cowboys
Oliver Gildart	Dolphins
Jacob Liddle	St. George Illawarra Dragons
Tyrone Peachey	Penrith Panthers
Jackson Hastings	Newcastle Knights

== Pre-Season Challenge ==
Date	Round	Opponent	Venue	Score	Tries	Goals	Attendance
Thursday, 9 February	Trial 1	New Zealand Warriors	Mount Smart Stadium, Auckland	48 – 12	Trey Peni 56'; Stefano Utoikamanu 59'	Brandon Wakeham (2/2)	4,000
Sunday, 19 February	Trial 2	Canberra Raiders	Belmore Sports Ground, Sydney	36 – 4	Junior Tupou 27', 74'; Tommy Talau 35'; Asu Kepaoa 42'; Charlie Staines 45'; David Nofoaluma 62'; Justin Matamua 70'	Adam Doueihi (3/5); Brandon Wakeham (1/2)	7,800

== Regular season ==
=== Ladder ===
2023 NRL season
Pos	Team	Pld	W	D	L	B	PF	PA	PD	Pts
1	Penrith Panthers (P)	24	18	0	6	3	645	312	+333	42
2	Brisbane Broncos	24	18	0	6	3	639	425	+214	42
3	Melbourne Storm	24	16	0	8	3	627	459	+168	38
4	New Zealand Warriors	24	16	0	8	3	572	448	+124	38
5	Newcastle Knights	24	14	1	9	3	626	451	+175	35
6	Cronulla-Sutherland Sharks	24	14	0	10	3	619	497	+122	34
7	Sydney Roosters	24	13	0	11	3	472	496	−24	32
8	Canberra Raiders	24	13	0	11	3	486	623	−137	32
9	South Sydney Rabbitohs	24	12	0	12	3	564	505	+59	30
10	Parramatta Eels	24	12	0	12	3	587	574	+13	30
11	North Queensland Cowboys	24	12	0	12	3	546	542	+4	30
12	Manly Warringah Sea Eagles	24	11	1	12	3	545	539	+6	29
13	Dolphins	24	9	0	15	3	520	631	−111	24
14	Gold Coast Titans	24	9	0	15	3	527	653	−126	24
15	Canterbury-Bankstown Bulldogs	24	7	0	17	3	438	769	−331	20
16	St. George Illawarra Dragons	24	5	0	19	3	474	673	−199	16
17	Wests Tigers	24	4	0	20	3	385	675	−290	14

=== Results by round ===
Round	1	2	3	4	5	6	7	8	9	10	11	12	13	14	15	16	17	18	19	20	21	22	23	24	25	26	27
Ground	H	H	A	A	A	H	–	H	A	H	A	H	–	H	A	H	–	A	H	A	A	H	A	H	H	A	A
Result	L	L	L	L	L	L	B	L	W	W	L	W	B	L	L	L	B	L	L	L	L	L	L	L	W	L	L
Position	16	17	17	17	17	17	17	17	17	17	17	16	15	16	16	17	16	17	17	17	17	17	17	17	17	17	17
Points	0	0	0	0	0	0	2	2	4	6	6	8	10	10	10	10	12	12	12	12	12	12	12	12	14	14	14

Source: National Rugby League
A = Away; H = Home; N = Neutral; B = Bye; W = Win; D = Draw; L = Loss

=== Matches ===
The league fixtures were announced on 10 November 2022.

Win Draw Loss Fixtures

Round 1: 5 March 2023	Wests Tigers	10–22	Gold Coast Titans	Leichhardt
18:15 AEDT	Tries: Doueihi 45'; Laurie 64'; Goals: Doueihi 1/3 3 pen'	Report	Tries: Sami 13', 23'; McIntyre 41'; Brimson 69'; Goals: Boyd 3/4 14', 24', 43'	Stadium: Leichhardt Oval; Attendance: 14,667; Referee: Peter Gough

Round 2: 12 March 2023	Wests Tigers	12–14	Newcastle Knights	Leichhardt
16:05 AEDT	Tries: Kepaoa 33'; Utoikamanu 79'; Goals: Doueihi 2/2 36', 79'	Report	Tries: Young 10', 60'; Fitzgibbon 15'; Goals: Hastings 1/3 12'; Sin bin: Young (yellow card) 29' to 39'; Sent off: J. Saifiti (red card) 64'	Stadium: Leichhardt Oval; Attendance: 13,214; Referee: Peter Gough

Round 3: 19 March 2023	Canterbury-Bankstown Bulldogs	26–22	Wests Tigers	Belmore
16:05 AEDT	Tries: Perham 4'; Addo-Carr 13', 28'; Burton 54'; Goals: Flanagan 5/5 6', 15', 30', 40 pen', 55'	Report	Tries: Naden 21'; Brooks 66'; Pole 69'; Staines 70'; Goals: Doueihi 3/4 23', 69', 70'	Stadium: Belmore Sports Ground; Attendance: 16,404; Referee: Todd Smith

Round 4: 24 March 2023	Melbourne Storm	24–12	Wests Tigers	Melbourne
18:00 AEDT	Tries: Warbrick 18'; Meaney 23'; Olam 33'; Munster 38'; Goals: Meaney 4/6 5 pen', 25', 39', 65 pen'	Report	Tries: Kepaoa 29'; Koroisau 54'; Goals: Doueihi 2/2 31', 55'	Stadium: AAMI Park; Attendance: 11,669; Referee: Ben Cummins

Round 5: 1 April 2023	Brisbane Broncos	46–12	Wests Tigers	Brisbane
19:35 AEST	Tries: Riki 9', 33'; Capewell 14'; Haas 19'; Cobbo 29'; Farnworth 46'; Staggs 52', 78'; Goals: Reynolds 7/8 16', 20', 30', 35', 48', 53', 79'	Report	Tries: Papali'i 43'; Simpkin 63'; Goals: Doueihi 2/2 44', 64'	Stadium: Suncorp Stadium; Attendance: 27,553; Referee: Chris Sutton

Round 6: 10 April 2023	Wests Tigers	22–28	Parramatta Eels	Sydney Olympic Park
16:00 AEST	Tries: To'a 23'; Kepaoa 49'; Naden 64'; Tupou 71'; Goals: Doueihi 2/3 25', 66'; Koroisau 0/1; Brooks 1/1 77 pen'	Report	Tries: Gutherson 11'; Penisini 14'; Cartwright 33'; Sivo 45', 75'; Goals: Moses 4/5 12', 16', 35', 76'	Stadium: Accor Stadium; Attendance: 28,611; Referee: Ben Cummins

Round 7 (Bye for Wests Tigers)

Round 8: 23 April 2023	Wests Tigers	16–22	Manly Warringah Sea Eagles	Campbelltown
16:00 AEST	Tries: Staines 35'; Koroisau 55'; To'a 63'; Goals: Wakeham 2/3 36', 56'	Report	Tries: Cherry-Evans 7'; Olakau'atu 20'; Saab 71'; Goals: Garrick 5/5 9', 21', 45 pen', 72', 77 pen'	Stadium: Campbelltown Sports Stadium; Attendance: 10,033; Referee: Todd Smith

Round 9: 29 April 2023	Penrith Panthers	8–12	Wests Tigers	Bathurst
19:35 AEST	Tries: Peachey 10'; Goals: Crichton 2/2 12', 29 pen' Sin bin: Luke (yellow card) 68' to 78'	Report	Tries: Wakeham 2'; Nofoaluma 49'; Goals: Wakeham 2/4 4', 40 pen' Sin bin: Naden (yellow card) 16' to 26'	Stadium: Carrington Park; Attendance: 11,055; Referee: Adam Gee

Round 10: 7 May 2023	Wests Tigers	18–16	St. George Illawarra Dragons	Brisbane
13:50 AEST	Tries: To'a 13'; Nofoaluma 21'; Tupou 64'; Goals: Wakeham 3/4 6 pen', 15', 23'	Report	Tries: Ravalawa 9'; Sullivan 31', 52'; Goals: Bird 0/1; Sullivan 2/2 33', 54'	Stadium: Suncorp Stadium; Attendance: 34,568; Referee: Peter Gough

Round 11: 13 May 2023	South Sydney Rabbitohs	20–0	Wests Tigers	Sydney Olympic Park
15:00 AEST	Tries: Milne 24', 72'; L. Mitchell 74'; Goals: L. Mitchell 4/4 26', 51 pen', 73', 76'	Report		Stadium: Accor Stadium; Attendance: 21,013; Referee: Liam Kennedy

Round 12: 20 May 2023	Wests Tigers	66–18	North Queensland Cowboys	Leichhardt
17:30 AEST	Tries: Utoikamanu 5'; Tupou 9', 47'; Nofoaluma 17', 72'; Bula 39'; Pole 44'; To'a 63', 66'; Ofahengaue 69'; Bateman 77'; Goals: Wakeham 8/8 7', 10', 18', 40', 46', 49', 65', 67'; Brooks 1/1 71'; Koroisau 2/2 74', 78'	Report	Tries: Feldt 23'; Leilua 54'; Cotter 61'; Goals: Holmes 3/3 25', 56', 61'	Stadium: Leichhardt Oval; Attendance: 12,247; Referee: Ben Cummins

Round 13 (Bye for Wests Tigers)

Round 14: 2 June 2023	Wests Tigers	19–20	Canberra Raiders	Campbelltown
20:00 AEST	Tries: Bula 68'; Bateman 70'; Wakeham 72'; Goals: Wakeham 3/3 69', 71', 74'; Field goals: Brooks 75'	Report	Tries: Fogarty 6', 48'; Rapana 32'; Goals: Fogarty 4/4 7', 34', 49', 77 pen' Sin bin: Starling (yellow card) 67' to 77'	Stadium: Campbelltown Sports Stadium; Attendance: 11,201; Referee: Gerard Sutton

Round 15: 8 June 2023	Gold Coast Titans	28–12	Wests Tigers	Gold Coast
19:50 AEST	Tries: Brimson 10'; Haas 26'; Campbell 33'; T. Fa'asuamaleaui 57'; Sami 60'; Goals: Boyd 4/5 28', 34', 58', 62'	Report	Tries: Klemmer 19'; Bula 64'; Goals: Wakeham 2/2 21', 65'	Stadium: Cbus Super Stadium; Attendance: 10,232; Referee: Todd Smith

Round 16: 17 June 2023	Wests Tigers	6–28	Melbourne Storm	Campbelltown
19:35 AEST	Tries: Twal 22'; Goals: Wakeham 1/1 24'	Report	Tries: Warbrick 3', 30', 53', 64'; Wishart 36'; Bradley 72'; Goals: Meaney 2/6 32', 74'	Stadium: Campbelltown Sports Stadium; Attendance: 8,517; Referee: Ziggy Przeklasa-Adamski

Round 17 (Bye for Wests Tigers)

Round 18: 1 July 2023	North Queensland Cowboys	74–0	Wests Tigers	Townsville
17:30 AEST	Tries: Dearden 14'; Valemei 16', 43'; Leilua 19'; Drinkwater 23', 28'; Taulagi 36', 52', 65'; Holmes 39', 49'; Nanai 68'; McLean 79'; Goals: Holmes 11/13 15', 18', 20', 24', 30', 38', 40', 50', 67', 69', 80'	Report	Sin bin: Twal (yellow card) 31' to 41'	Stadium: Queensland Country Bank Stadium; Attendance: 20,535; Referee: Liam Kennedy

Round 19: 6 July 2023	Wests Tigers	12–36	Cronulla-Sutherland Sharks	Parramatta
19:50 AEST	Tries: Talau 27'; Blore 39'; Goals: Wakeham 2/2 28', 39'	Report	Tries: Katoa 15', 45', 79'; Talakai 22', 67'; Ramien 56'; Hynes 72'; Goals: Hynes 4/8 11 pen', 23', 46', 69'	Stadium: CommBank Stadium; Attendance: 9,215; Referee: Todd Smith

Round 20: 14 July 2023	Newcastle Knights	34–18	Wests Tigers	Newcastle
20:00 AEST	Tries: Marzhew 3'; Best 6'; Young 12', 55'; D. Saifiti 25'; Ponga 43'; Gamble 73'; Goals: Ponga 3/7 27', 57', 74'; Sin bin: Hetherington (yellow card) 42' to 52'	Report	Tries: Bula 29', 51'; Koroisau 37'; Goals: Wakeham 3/3 31', 38', 52'	Stadium: McDonald Jones Stadium; Attendance: 18,470; Referee: Peter Gough

Round 21: 20 July 2023	St. George Illawarra Dragons	18–14	Wests Tigers	Wollongong
19:50 AEST	Tries: Sloan 16'; Lomax 22'; Ravalawa 63'; Goals: Lomax 3/3 17', 23', 65'; Sin bin: Sloan (yellow card) 32' to 42'	Report	Tries: Tupou 9', 33'; Koroisau 39'; Goals: Wakeham 1/3 40'	Stadium: WIN Stadium; Attendance: 7,246; Referee: Ben Cummins

Round 22: 28 July 2023	Wests Tigers	18–32	South Sydney Rabbitohs	Tamworth
18:00 AEST	Tries: Koroisau 8'; Papali'i 43'; Pole 56'; Goals: Koroisau 2/2 10', 57'; Brooks 1/1 44'	Report	Tries: Johnston 1', 22', 65'; Tass 17'; Koloamatangi 26'; Murray 75'; Goals: L. Mitchell 4/6 2', 27', 66', 76'	Stadium: Scully Park; Attendance: 10,453; Referee: Ziggy Przeklasa-Adamski

Round 23: 6 August 2023	Canberra Raiders	22–18	Wests Tigers	Canberra
16:05 AEST	Tries: Kris 25', 44'; Young 28'; Timoko 63'; Goals: Fogarty 3/4 30', 45', 64'	Report	Tries: Staines 35'; Nofoaluma 56'; Brooks 70'; Goals: Koroisau 3/3 36', 58', 70'	Stadium: GIO Stadium; Attendance: 12,841; Referee: Peter Gough

Round 24: 12 August 2023	Wests Tigers	22–30	New Zealand Warriors	Hamilton
19:30 NZST	Tries: To'a 16', 77'; Brooks 43'; Laurie 57'; Goals: Koroisau 3/4 17', 19', 58'	Report	Tries: Metcalf 6'; Pompey 13'; Watene-Zelezniak 32'; Harris 49'; Fonua-Blake 76'; Goals: Johnson 2/2 8', 68 pen' Pompey 3/4 15', 50', 77'	Stadium: FMG Stadium Waikato; Attendance: 25,118; Referee: Chris Butler

Round 25: 19 August 2023	Wests Tigers	24–23	Dolphins	Parramatta
15:00 AEST	Tries: Pole 13'; Kepaoa 22'; Seyfarth 53'; Simpkin 56'; Goals: Koroisau 4/5 15', 24', 58', 76 pen'	Report	Tries: Isaako 17'; Aitken 26'; Bostock 43'; Fuller 62'; Goals: Isaako 3/5 18', 64', 67 pen' Field goals: Isaako 74'	Stadium: CommBank Stadium; Attendance: 9,245; Referee: Ben Cummins

Round 26: 26 August 2023	Sydney Roosters	32–8	Wests Tigers	Moore Park
17:30 AEST	Tries: Walker 14'; Tupou 38'; May 47'; Sua'ali'i 60'; Radley 71'; Goals: Sua'ali'i 6/6 15', 29 pen', 39', 48', 61', 72'; Sin bin: Waerea-Hargreaves (yellow card) 64' to 74'	Report	Tries: Reilly 6'; Goals: Koroisau 2/2 7', 23 pen'	Stadium: Allianz Stadium; Attendance: 22,511; Referee: Todd Smith

Round 27: 1 September 2023	Manly Warringah Sea Eagles	54–12	Wests Tigers	Brookvale
18:00 AEST	Tries: Koula 0', 16'; Saab 29', 31'; Bullemor 38'; Olakau'atu 49'; J. Trbojevic 56'; Vaega 60'; Chan 62'; Cherry-Evans 64'; Goals: Cherry-Evans 7/10 2', 18', 40', 50', 57', 63', 66'	Report	Tries: Koroisau 9'; Kepaoa 70'; Goals: Koroisau 2/2 10', 71'	Stadium: 4 Pines Park; Attendance: 16,503; Referee: Belinda Sharpe
