= Tommy Talau =

Samoa international rugby league footballer (born 2000)

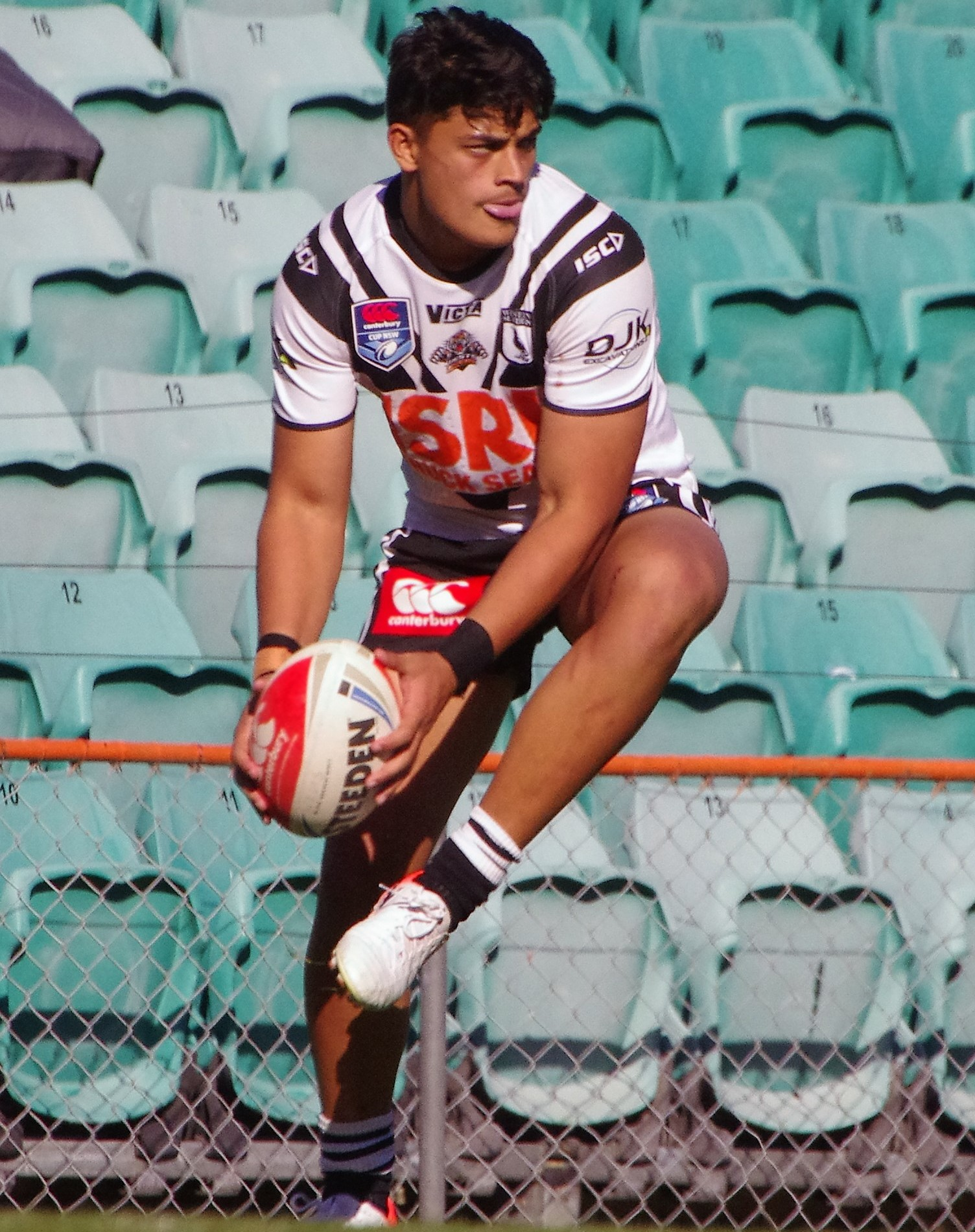

Personal information
- Born: 30 April 2000 (age 26) Sydney, New South Wales, Australia
- Height: 189 cm (6 ft 2 in)
- Weight: 94 kg (14 st 11 lb)

Playing information
- Position: Centre, Wing
Club
Years	Team	Pld	T	G	FG	P
2019–23	Wests Tigers	47	20	0	0	80
2024–25	Manly Sea Eagles	36	21	0	0	84
2026–	Sydney Roosters	5	1	0	0	4
	Total	88	42	0	0	168
Representative
Years	Team	Pld	T	G	FG	P
2023	Samoa	1	0	0	0	0
- Source: As of 10 November 2026
- Partner: Jessica Sergis
- Father: Willie Talau

Tommy Talau (born 30 April 2000) is a Samoan international rugby league footballer who plays as a centre and winger for the Sydney Roosters in the National Rugby League (NRL).

== Background ==
Talau was born in Sydney, New South Wales, Australia. He is the son of former New Zealand and Samoan international, Willie Talau.

Talau played his junior rugby league for the Moorebank Rams. He attended Westfields Sports High School and joined the junior ranks of the Canterbury-Bankstown Bulldogs. In 2018 he captained the Bulldogs' Under-18 team in the grand final of the S. G. Ball Cup. In the same year he was selected in the Australian Schoolboys rugby league team. At the end of the 2018 season he moved from the Bulldogs to the Wests Tigers, signing a development contract.

== Career ==
=== 2019 ===
Talau made his first-grade debut starting at centre in round 22 of the 2019 NRL season for the Wests Tigers in their 32-12 loss against the Manly-Warringah Sea Eagles at Brookvale Oval. He became the first player born in the 2000s to play for the Tigers.

=== 2020 ===
In round 7 of the 2020 NRL season, Talau scored two tries as the Wests Tigers defeated Canterbury-Bankstown 34-6 at Bankwest Stadium.

Talau played 12 games and scored eight tries for Wests Tigers in the 2020 NRL season as the club missed out on the finals by finishing 11th.

=== 2021 ===
Talau played a total of 22 games for the Wests Tigers and scored 11 tries in the 2021 NRL season as the club finished 13th and missed the finals.

=== 2022 ===
On 25 October, Talau signed a one-year deal to remain at the club until the end of 2023. Talau missed the entire 2022 season with a ruptured ACL injury.

=== 2023 ===
On 26 June, it was announced that Talau had signed a two-year deal to join Manly starting in 2024. Talau played a total of twelve games for the Wests Tigers in the 2023 NRL season as the club finished with the Wooden Spoon for a second straight year.

=== 2024 ===
In round 12 of the 2024 NRL season, Talau scored two tries for Manly in their 26-20 upset victory over Melbourne. In round 14, Talau scored four tries for Manly in their 32-22 loss against Penrith. Talau played 23 matches for Manly in the 2024 NRL season and scored 18 tries as they finished 7th on the table and qualified for the finals. Manly would be eliminated in the second week of the finals by the Sydney Roosters.

=== 2025 ===
Talau made 13 appearances for Manly in the 2025 NRL season as the club missed the finals. On 8 September, it was announced Talau had been released by Manly after not being offered a new contract.

=== 2026 ===
On 5 January, the Sydney Roosters announced that they had signed Talau for the 2026 season. Talau played only five matches for the club in the 2026 NRL season.

== Statistics ==
Year	Team	Games	Tries	Pts
2019	Wests Tigers	1		
2020	Wests Tigers	12	8	32
2021	Wests Tigers	22	11	44
2023	Wests Tigers	12	1	4
2024	Manly Warringah Sea Eagles	23	18	72
2025	Manly Warringah Sea Eagles	13	3	12
2026	Sydney Roosters	5	1	4
	Totals	88	42	168

== Personal life ==
In 2024, Talau began a relationship with Sydney Roosters NRLW player Jessica Sergis. The pair became engaged in April 2026.
