= Asu Kepaoa =

New Zealand rugby league footballer

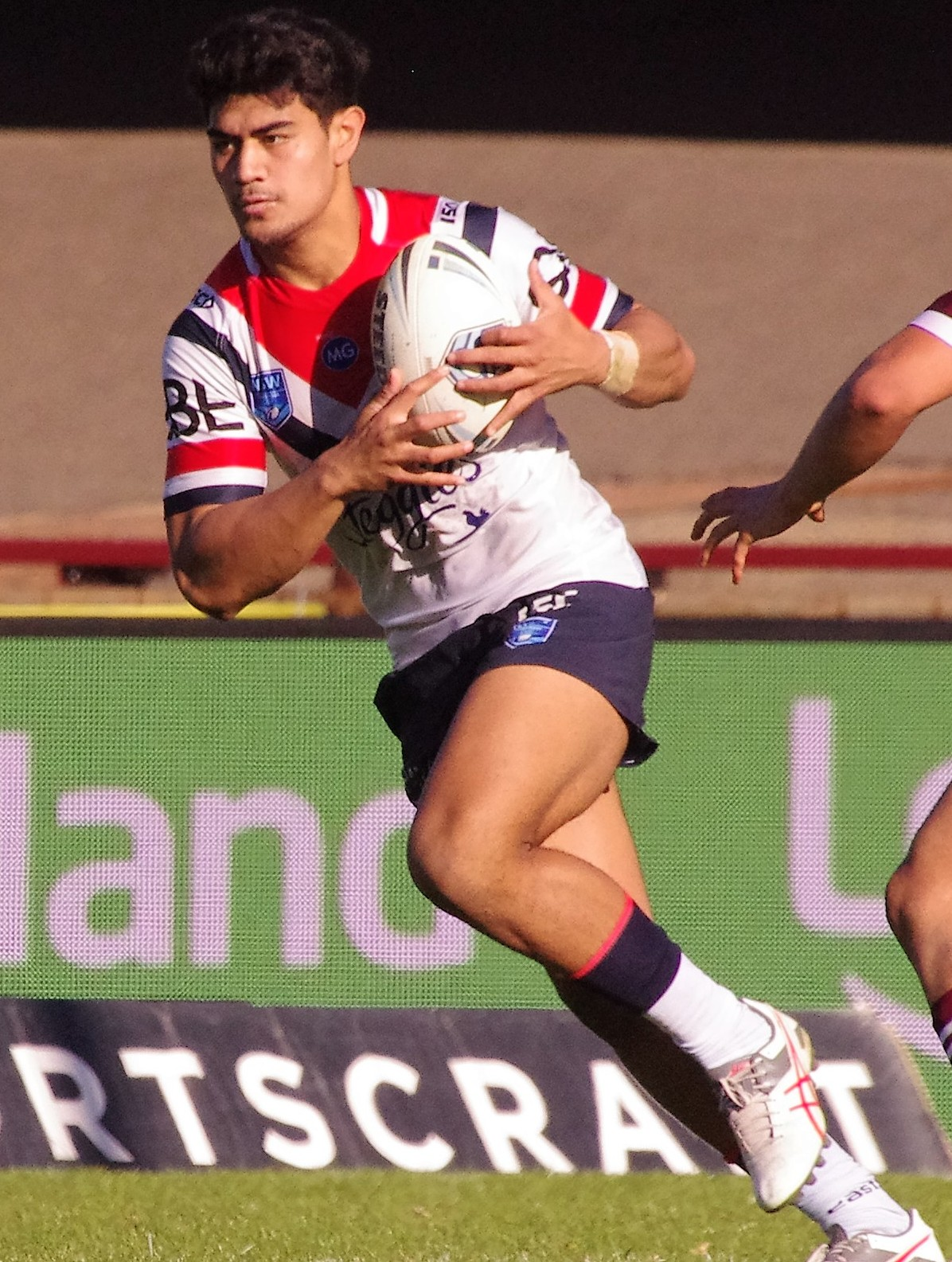

Personal information
- Born: 2 February 2000 (age 26) Auckland, New Zealand
- Height: 185 cm (6 ft 1 in)
- Weight: 100 kg (15 st 10 lb)

Playing information
- Position: Wing, Centre, Second-row
Club
Years	Team	Pld	T	G	FG	P
2020–24	Wests Tigers	42	13	0	0	52
2026–	Newcastle Knights	0	0	0	0	0
	Total	42	13	0	0	52
- Source: As of 19 May 2024

Asu Kepaoa (born 2 February 2000) is a professional rugby league footballer who plays as a wing, centre and second-row forward for the Newcastle Knights in the National Rugby League (NRL).

== Background ==
Kepaoa was born on 2 February 2000 in Auckland, New Zealand. He attended De La Salle College before moving to Australia.

== Playing career ==
=== 2020 ===
Kepaoa made his first grade debut in round 13 of the 2020 NRL season for the Wests Tigers against Newcastle.

In round 18 against South Sydney, he scored his first try in the top grade as Wests were defeated 26–24 at Bankwest Stadium.

The following week, he scored his first double in the top grade as Wests were defeated 50–22 by Melbourne.

=== 2021 ===
On 18 April, it was announced that he would miss the remainder of the 2021 NRL season with a knee injury which occurred during the club's loss against South Sydney in round 6 of the competition.

=== 2022 ===
On 24 July, in the round 19 match against the North Queensland Cowboys at Queensland Country Bank Stadium, Kepaoa cost his side victory when he was determined by the video referee to have obstructed North Queensland winger Kyle Feldt following a short kick-off in the final second of game time, at which point the Tigers led 26–25. The Tigers lost the match 26–27 after Valentine Holmes booted the match-winning penalty goal for North Queensland on the full-time siren. In round 24, Kepaoa was sent to the sin bin for a high tackle in the final minute of the match against St. George Illawarra. Zac Lomax then kicked a penalty goal for St. George Illawarra which won the game 24–22 and meant that the Wests Tigers would finish with the Wooden Spoon for the first time in their history.

=== 2023 ===
Kepaoa played a total of 19 games for the Wests Tigers in the 2023 NRL season as the club finished with the Wooden Spoon for a second straight year.

=== 2024 ===
On 12 June, Kepaoa was released from his Wests Tigers contract to sign a two-year deal with Penrith. Kepaoa made no first grade appearances for Penrith in 2024. He would instead play for the clubs reserve grade team scoring ten tries in 13 matches.

=== 2025 ===
On 31 July, Newcastle announced that they had signed Kepaoa on a two-year deal. Keoaoa had been playing for Penrith's NSW Cup side where he scored 21 tries in 18 games.

== Controversy ==
On 31 January 2021, Kepaoa and fellow NRL player Zane Musgrove were detained by the police after allegedly abusing officers and refusing to move on from outside of the Coogee Bay Hotel. They were released without charge, however Kepaoa was issued with an infringement notice. The matter was then passed on to the NRL Integrity Unit.

On 19 June 2026, in a NSW Cup match between the Newcastle Knights and the St George Illawarra Dragons, Kepaoa was sent off for an alleged homophobic slur against a Dragons player. Kepaoa was later suspended for six matches over the incident.
