= Junior Tupou =

NZ rugby league player

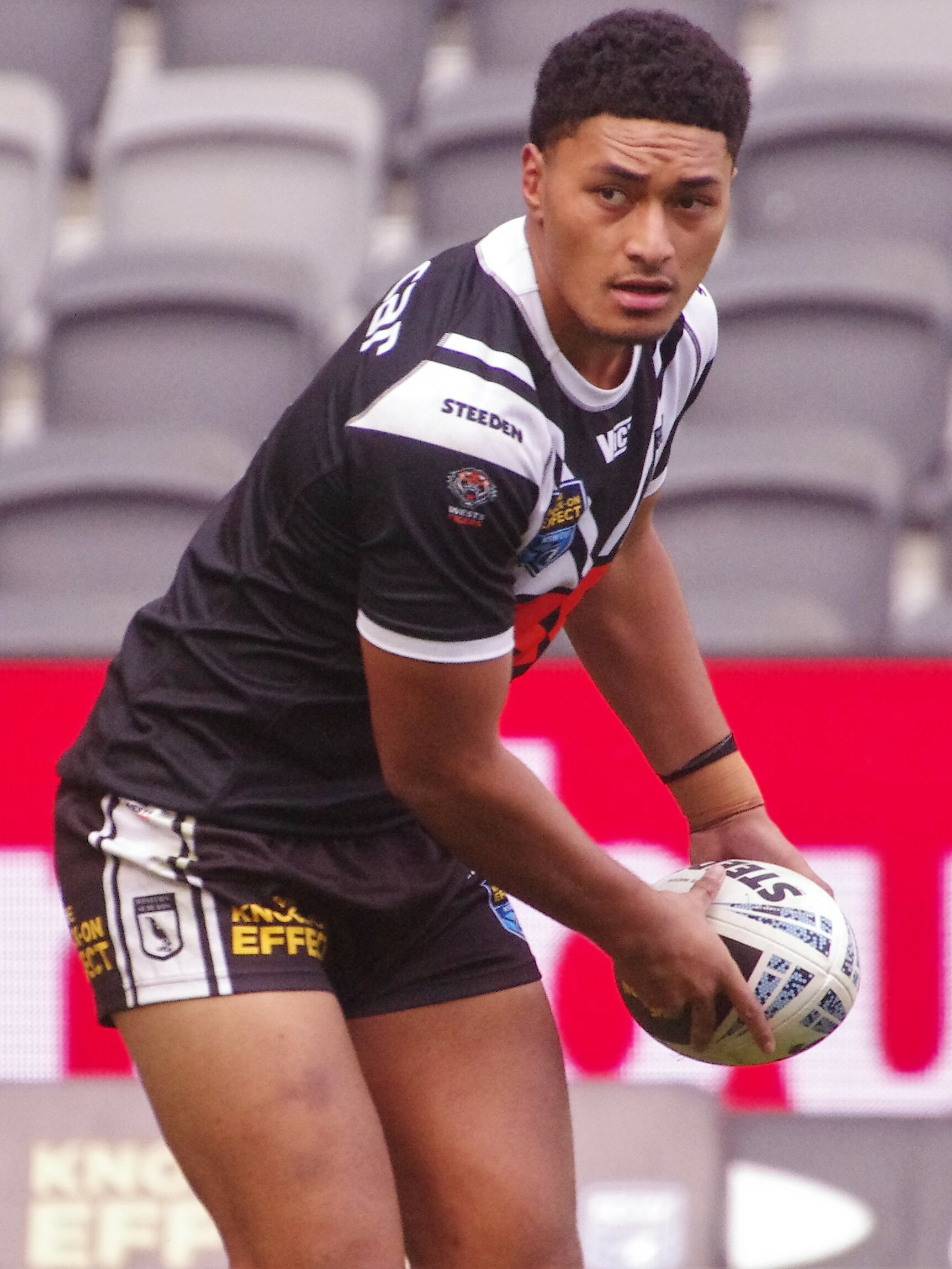

Personal information
- Full name: Junior Tupou
- Born: 29 July 2002 (age 24) Auckland, New Zealand
- Height: 188 cm (6 ft 2 in)
- Weight: 98 kg (15 st 6 lb)

Playing information
- Position: Wing, Centre
Club
Years	Team	Pld	T	G	FG	P
2022–24	Wests Tigers	34	10	0	0	40
2025	Dolphins	2	0	0	0	0
2025–26	Sydney Roosters	2	0	0	0	0
2026–	Wests Tigers	6	1	0	0	4
	Total	44	11	0	0	44
- Source: As of 6 September 2026

Junior Tupou (born 29 July 2002) is a professional rugby league footballer who plays as a winger for the Wests Tigers in the National Rugby League (NRL).

He previously played for the Dolphins and the Sydney Roosters.

== Background ==
Tupou was born in New Zealand and raised in Canberra, playing both codes of rugby football. He attended St. Edmund's College, where he represented the school's 1st XV rugby union team at the age of fifteen.

== Career ==
=== Wests Tigers (2022-24) ===
Tupou made his debut in Round 10 of the 2022 NRL season (Magic Round) for the Tigers against the North Queensland Cowboys, scoring a try in the 13th minute. Tupou played only four games for the Wests Tigers as the club claimed the wooden spoon for the first time.

In round 21 of the 2023 NRL season, Tupou scored two tries for the Wests Tigers in their 18-14 loss against St. George Illawarra. Before the game, the match was dubbed the "Spoon Bowl" by some media outlets due to the Wests Tigers being bottom of the table and St. George Illawarra sitting in second last position.

Tupou was the leader for line breaks at the Wests Tigers in 2023, with 17, ranking him 19th in the entire competition. He was also 25th in the NRL for tackle breaks, again best for the Tigers. Tupou played a total of 22 games and scored six tries as the club finished with the wooden spoon for a second straight year.

=== Dolphins (2025) ===
On 22 December 2023, it was announced that Tupou had signed a three-year deal with the Dolphins from the 2025 season. He played two games.

=== Sydney Roosters (2025-2026) ===
In late June 2025, Tupou transferred to the Sydney Roosters.

=== Wests Tigers (2026-) ===
On 1st July 2026, Wests Tigers announced they had signed Tupou back to the club on a mid-season switch effective immediately.
