= Brent Naden =

Australian rugby league footballer (born 1995)

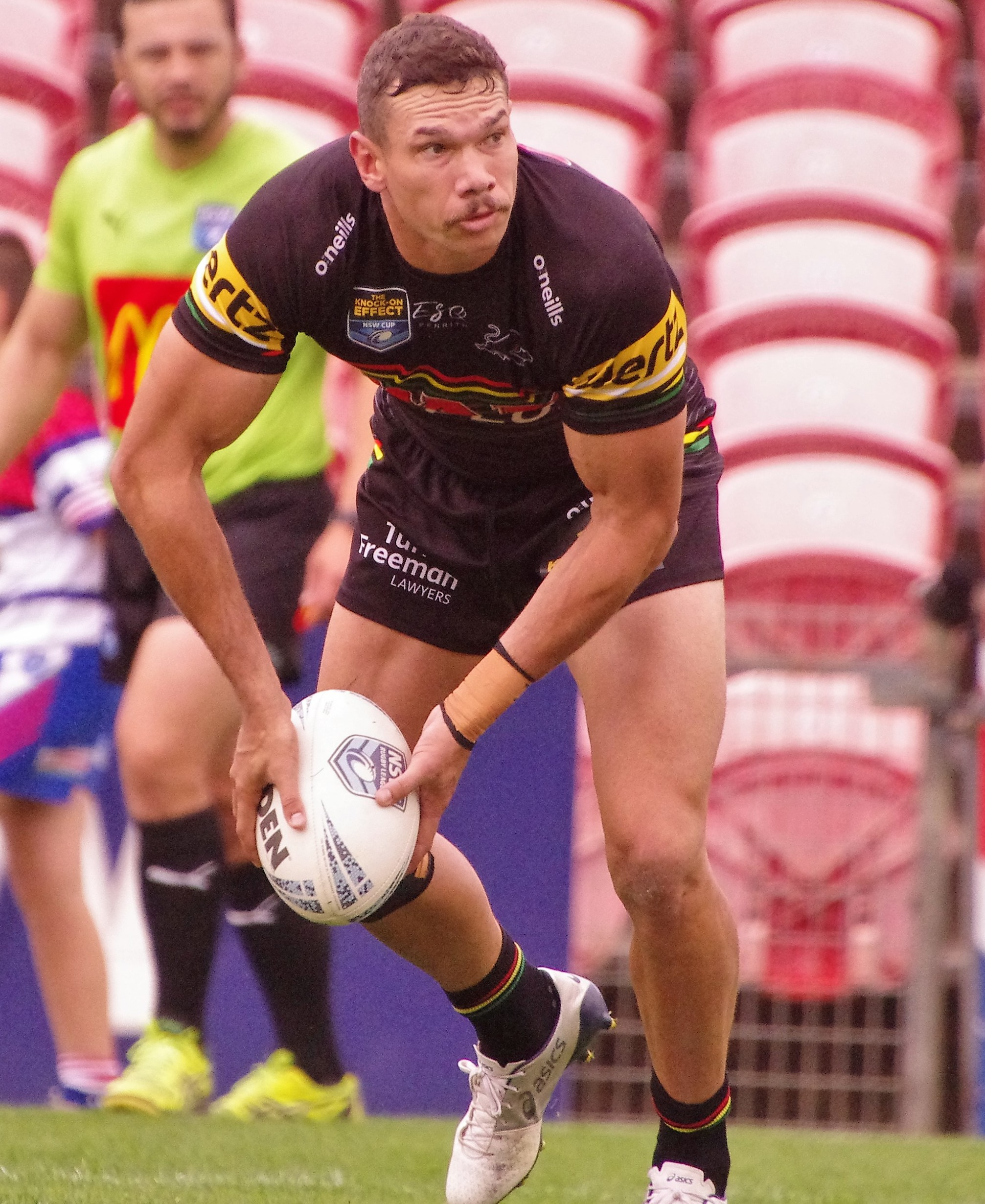

Personal information
- Born: 30 December 1995 (age 30) Wellington, New South Wales, Australia
- Height: 189 cm (6 ft 2 in)
- Weight: 97 kg (15 st 4 lb)

Playing information
- Position: Centre, Wing
Club
Years	Team	Pld	T	G	FG	P
2019–21	Penrith Panthers	37	24	0	0	96
2022	Canterbury Bulldogs	8	1	0	0	4
2022–25	Wests Tigers	35	9	0	0	36
	Total	80	34	0	0	136
Representative
Years	Team	Pld	T	G	FG	P
2022–25	Indigenous All Stars	3	1	0	0	4
- Source: As of 24 August 2025

Brent Naden (born 30 December 1995) is an Australian professional rugby league footballer who last played as a centre and winger for the Wests Tigers in the National Rugby League (NRL).

Naden previously played for the Canterbury-Bankstown Bulldogs, and the Penrith Panthers with whom was part of the 2021 NRL Grand Final win as 18th man.

== Background ==
Naden was born in Wellington, New South Wales, and is of Indigenous Australian (Wiradjuri) and German descent. He was educated at Wellington High School.

Naden played his junior rugby league for the Wellington Cowboys, before being signed by the Penrith Panthers.

== Playing career ==
=== Early years ===
From 2014 to 2015, Naden played for the Penrith Panthers' NRL Under-20s team, captaining the side to a premiership and being named on the interchange bench in the NYC Team of the Year in 2015.

In 2016, Naden graduated to their Intrust Super Premiership NSW team.

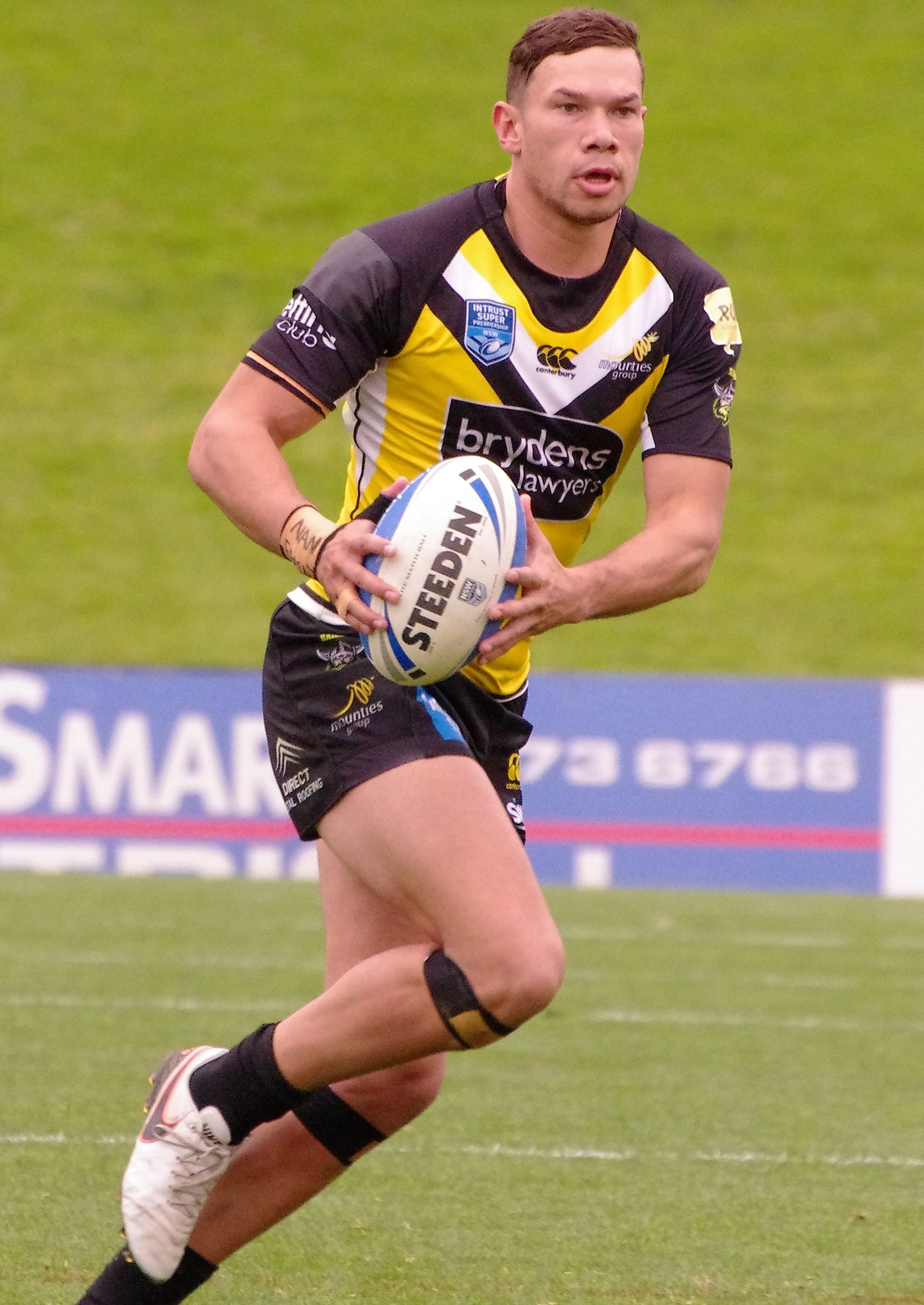
Naden playing for the Mounties in 2017

In 2017, Naden joined the Canberra Raiders but failed to make an NRL appearance, only appearing in their ISP NSW team Mount Pritchard Mounties.

In 2018, Naden joined the Newcastle Knights on a 1-year contract, but again failed to make an NRL appearance.

=== 2019 ===
In 2019, Naden rejoined the Panthers. In round 12 of the 2019 NRL season, Naden made his NRL debut for the Panthers against the Manly Warringah Sea Eagles.

In round 15 against the New Zealand Warriors, Naden scored 2 tries, one of which was an 80-metre effort as he beat several New Zealand players to reach the try line. Penrith would go on to win the match in extra time 19–18.

In Round 18 against St George, Naden scored two tries as Penrith won the match 40–18 at Penrith Stadium.

=== 2020 ===
In round 20 of the 2020 NRL season, Naden scored two tries in a 42–0 victory over Canterbury-Bankstown at ANZ Stadium. Penrith finished the regular season having already claimed the Minor Premiership at week earlier.

Naden played 19 games for Penrith in the 2020 NRL season scoring 12 tries. He played in the 2020 NRL Grand Final where Penrith lost to Melbourne 26–20.

=== 2021 ===
On April 28, 2021, it was announced that Naden had signed a two-year deal with Canterbury-Bankstown starting in 2022.

In round 22, Naden scored two tries for Penrith in a 34–16 victory over St. George Illawarra.

=== 2022 ===
In round 1 of the 2022 NRL season, Naden made his club debut for Canterbury in their 6–4 victory against North Queensland at the Queensland Country Bank Stadium. On 17 May after Trent Barrett stood down as coach of the Canterbury-Bankstown Bulldogs, Naden was signed by the West Tigers effective immediately. Naden made his club debut the same week for the Wests Tigers in their 36–22 victory against his former club Canterbury at Leichhardt Oval. In round 14, Naden was sent off for a dangerous lifting tackle in Wests 30–4 loss against Manly. Naden played a total of ten games for the Wests Tigers in the 2022 NRL season as the club finished bottom of the table and claimed the Wooden Spoon for the first time.

=== 2023 ===
Naden played a total of eight games for the Wests Tigers in the 2023 NRL season and scored two tries as the club finished with the Wooden Spoon for a second straight year.

=== 2024 ===
Naden was limited to only nine games with the Wests Tigers in the 2024 NRL season as the club finished with the wooden spoon for a third straight year.

=== 2025 ===
On 21 February during a pre-season trial match, Naden suffered a serious knee injury. Naden had suffered a dislocated kneecap and be ruled out for two months. On 6 August, Naden was issued with a breach notice by the NRL and fined for using an offensive gesture during the Wests Tigers upset victory over Canterbury in round 22 of the 2025 NRL season. Naden played eight games for the Wests Tigers in the 2025 NRL season as the club finished 13th on the table. On 30 September, Naden was one of six players that departed the Wests Tigers at the end of their season. In late November 2025, it was announced that Naden had signed a two year deal with the Thirroul Butchers.

== Statistics ==
Year	Team	Games	Tries	Pts
2019	Penrith Panthers	12	8	32
2020	Penrith Panthers	18	12	48
2021	Penrith Panthers	7	4	16
2022	Canterbury-Bankstown Bulldogs	8	1	4
2022	Wests Tigers	10	5	20
2023	Wests Tigers	8	2	8
2024	Wests Tigers	9	1	4
2025	Wests Tigers	8	1	4
	Totals	80	34	136

*denotes season competing

== Personal life ==
In December 2020, Naden received a one-month ban for a doping violation after testing that took place at the 2020 NRL Grand Final. He also received treatment at a rehabilitation clinic in Sydney.
