= Brandon Wakeham =

Fiji international rugby league footballer

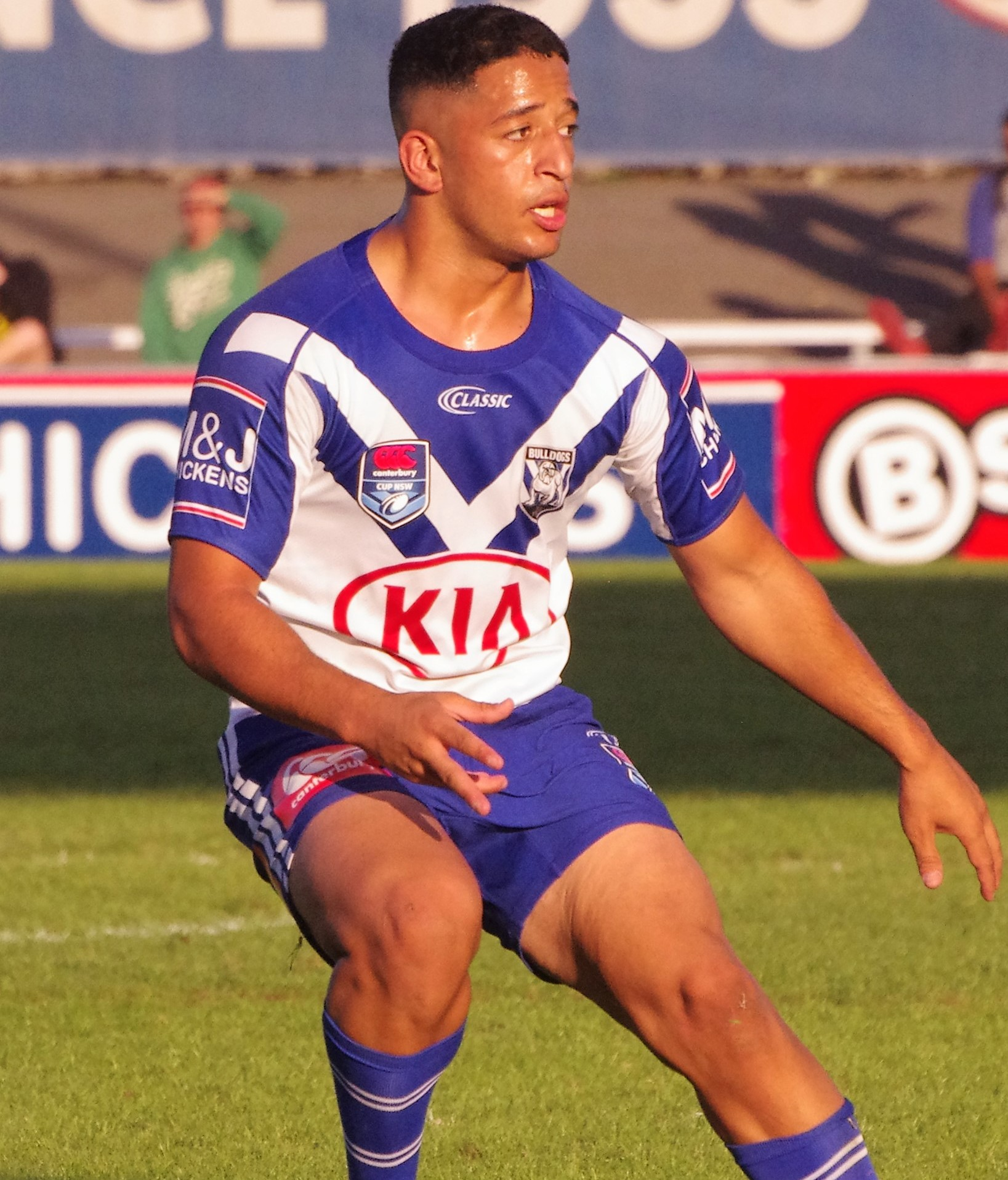

Personal information
- Born: 11 January 1999 (age 27) Kogarah, New South Wales, Australia
- Height: 172 cm (5 ft 8 in)
- Weight: 78 kg (12 st 4 lb)

Playing information
- Position: Halfback, Five-eighth, Hooker
Club
Years	Team	Pld	T	G	FG	P
2019–22	Canterbury Bulldogs	25	2	4	0	16
2023	Wests Tigers	15	2	27	0	62
2026–	Manly Sea Eagles	17	2	0	0	8
	Total	57	6	31	0	86
Representative
Years	Team	Pld	T	G	FG	P
2019–	Fiji	15	1	59	1	123
- Source: As of 6 November 2026

Brandon Wakeham (born 11 January 1999) is a Fiji international rugby league footballer who plays as a hooker or halfback for the Manly Warringah Sea Eagles in the NRL.

He previously played for the Canterbury-Bankstown Bulldogs and Wests Tigers.

== Background ==
Wakeham was born in Kogarah, New South Wales, Australia. He is of Fijian, English and Lebanese descent.

He played his junior rugby league for Chester Hill Rhinos

== Playing career ==
=== 2019 ===
He made his international debut for Fiji in their 56–14 victory vs Lebanon in the 2019 Pacific Test, where he scored 20 points in the match.

In round 15 of the 2019 NRL season, Wakeham made his NRL debut for the Canterbury-Bankstown Bulldogs off the interchange bench in his sides 14–12 win over the Cronulla-Sutherland Sharks. Wakeham played majority of the game at five-eighth after Kieran Foran left the field in the early stages due to injury.

=== 2020 ===
Wakeham played a total of 16 appearances for Canterbury in the 2020 NRL season. The club finished in 15th place on the table, only avoiding the Wooden Spoon by for and against.

=== 2021 ===
In round 7 of the 2021 NRL season, Wakeham became the first ever 18th man to take the field after Canterbury-Bankstown suffered a concussion which invoked the new 18th man rule which had been brought in by the NRL.

Wakeham made a total of eight appearances as Canterbury claimed the wooden spoon.

=== 2022 ===
On 1 June, Wakeham was suspended for four matches after being found guilty of eye gouging St. George Illawarra's Tyrell Sloan during a NSW Cup game at Belmore Sports Ground. He played a total of eight games for the club in the 2022 NRL season. Wakeham captained Canterbury's NSW Cup team in their grand final loss to Penrith at the Western Sydney Stadium.

=== 2023 ===
On 24 January, Wakeham signed a one-year deal to join the Wests Tigers ahead of the 2023 NRL season. Wakeham played a total of 15 games for the Wests Tigers in the 2023 NRL season with 2 tries and 8 try assists and kicking 27/33 goals as the club finished with the wooden spoon for a second straight year.

=== 2024 ===
On 9 January 2024, it was announced that he would join Blacktown Workers for 2024. In December, Wakeham was handed a lifeline by Manly as they had given him a train and trial contract.

=== 2025 ===
On 19 September, Wakeham extended his time with Manly Warringah Sea Eagles for a further season.

Wakeham played for Fiji at the 2025 Pacific Cup in 2 matches for the Bati coming up with 4 try assists, winning 44-24 against the Cook Islands.

=== 2026 ===
Wakeham made his return to the NRL in his first game since round 21 of 2023 - coming off the bench playing at hooker. Wakeham started at hooker in round 5 in Manly's first win of the season - coming up with a vital line break assist to get Manly rolling for the first try of the game. Manly went on to win 52-18. Wakeham played 17 matches for Manly in the 2026 NRL season as the club finished 9th on the table. On 30 October 2026, the Sea Eagles announced that Wakeham had re-signed with the club for a further two years.

== Statistics ==
Year	Team	Games	Tries	Goals	Pts
2019	Canterbury-Bankstown Bulldogs	3	1		4
2020	Canterbury-Bankstown Bulldogs	10		4	8
2021	Canterbury-Bankstown Bulldogs	8			
2022	Canterbury-Bankstown Bulldogs	4	1		4
2023	Wests Tigers	15	2	27	64
2026	Manly Warringah Sea Eagles	17	2		8
2027	Manly Warringah Sea Eagles				
	Totals	57	6	31	86

== Controversy ==
On 25 June 2021, Wakeham was one of three Canterbury players who were ordered to self-isolate after attending a COVID-19 exposure site in Sydney's Eastern Suburbs. The NRL had ordered players of all 16 teams a week earlier not to attend any restaurants, clubs or bars in the Waverley Local Government area.

On 15 May 2024, it was alleged that Wakeham had been arrested by police at a Blacktown Workers training session. It had been reported that Wakeham was not charged by police but was suspected of possessing cocaine and supplying MDMA. The following day, Wakeham was granted bail in court. He was charged with taking part in the supply of a prohibited drug in greater than a large commercial quantity, taking part in the supply of a prohibited drug in greater than an indictable amount and less than a commercial quantity, and participating in a criminal group. On 12 November it was announced that all the charges against Wakeham had been dropped.
