= Zane Musgrove =

Samoa international rugby league footballer

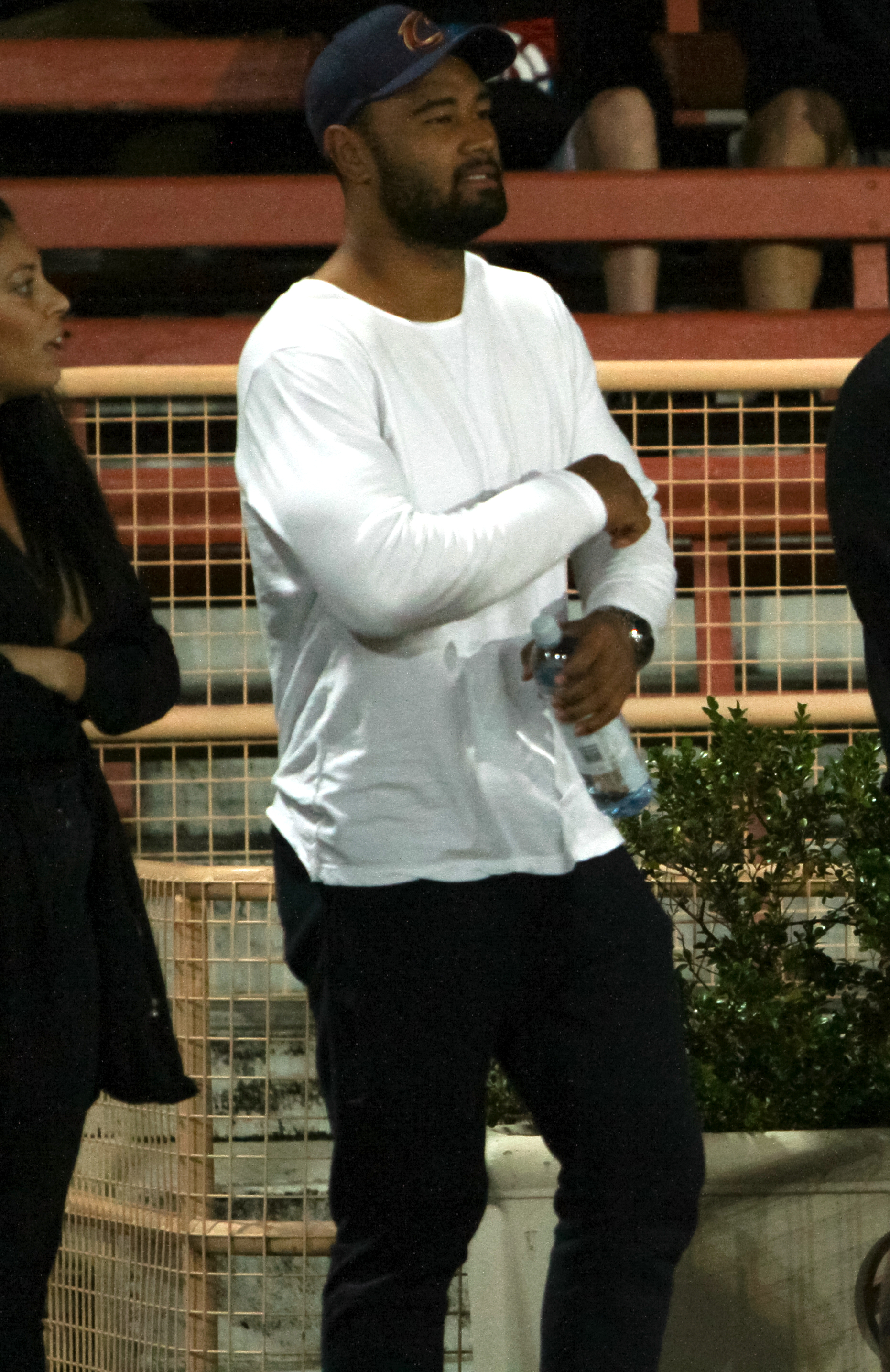

Personal information
- Born: 26 March 1996 (age 30) Auckland, New Zealand
- Height: 192 cm (6 ft 4 in)
- Weight: 110 kg (17 st 5 lb)

Playing information
- Position: Prop, Loose forward
Club
Years	Team	Pld	T	G	FG	P
2016–18	South Sydney Rabbitohs	27	0	0	0	0
2020–22	Wests Tigers	35	3	0	0	12
2023	St. George Illawarra	11	1	0	0	4
2024–25	Warrington Wolves	38	2	0	0	4
2025	Oldham RLFC	3	1	0	0	4
2025	Bradford Bulls	5	0	0	0	0
	Total	119	7	0	0	24
Representative
Years	Team	Pld	T	G	FG	P
2017	Samoa	1	0	0	0	0
2021–23	Māori All Stars	2	0	0	0	0
- Source: As of 26 July 2025

Zane Musgrove (born 26 March 1996) is a Samoan international rugby league footballer who is on a train and trial deal at the Brisbane Broncos.

He previously played for the South Sydney Rabbitohs, Wests Tigers and St George Illawarra Dragons in the NRL.

== Background ==
Born in Auckland, New Zealand, Musgrove is of Samoan and Māori descent and played his junior rugby league for Counties Manukau and the Mangere East Hawks. He was then signed by the South Sydney Rabbitohs.

== Playing career ==
=== Early career ===
In 2014 and 2015, Musgrove played for the South Sydney Rabbitohs' NYC team, although for the majority of 2015, he played for the North Sydney Bears in the New South Wales Cup. He finished that year with 13 games and scoring 1 try for North Sydney.

=== 2016 ===
In round 1 of the 2016 NRL season, Musgrove made his NRL debut for South Sydney against the Sydney Roosters. In November, he extended his contract with South Sydney from the end of 2017 until the end of 2020.

=== 2017 ===
Musgrove made 21 appearances for Souths in the 2017 NRL season but his team failed to make the finals for the second straight season.

=== 2018 ===
In the 2018 season, injuries and suspension prevented Musgrove from making a single appearance for Souths, playing twice for their feeder club, the North Sydney Bears, instead. He was suspended from club activities following a domestic violence charge, but that was lifted after he indicated his intention to plead not guilty. He was ultimately charged with property damage, which was overturned on appeal.

In November the West Tigers announced they had signed Musgrove for three years. He was released from his contract with the Souths, and began pre-season training with the Tigers.

In December, Musgrove was charged with indecent assault for an alleged incident at the Coogee Bay Hotel that occurred two days after he signed with the Wests Tigers. In January 2019 he pleaded not guilty.

=== 2019 ===
On 1 March, the NRL announced that they had refused to register Musgrove's contract until the players legal issues were finalized. A statement from the NRL read "A request by the Wests Tigers to register Zane Musgrove, who is currently facing indecent assault charges, has been refused until the case is concluded".

On 29 November, it was announced that Musgrove was allowed to resume training with the Wests Tigers after being cleared by the NRL.

=== 2021 ===
On 31 January, Musgrove and fellow NRL player Asu Kepaoa were detained by the police after allegedly abusing officers and refusing to move on from outside of the Coogee Bay Hotel. They were released without charge, however Kepaoa was issued with an infringement notice. The matter was then passed on to the NRL Integrity Unit.

On the 20th of February Musgrove represented the Māori All Stars in the 10-10 draw against the Indigenous All Stars.

Musgrove was limited to only five matches for the Wests Tigers in the 2021 NRL season as the club finished 13th and missed the finals.

=== 2022 ===
On 7 January, it was revealed that Musgrove would need to attend Waverley Local Court on 12 January in relation to a driving offence which dated back to November 2021. It was alleged that Musgrove had been stopped by police for driving without headlights on. After the police conducted further checks they discovered that Musgrove was driving on a suspended licence. Musgrove played a total of 24 matches for the Wests Tigers in the 2022 NRL season as the club finished bottom of the table and claimed the Wooden Spoon for the first time. On 19 October, Musgrove signed a two-year deal to join St. George Illawarra starting in 2023.

=== 2023 ===
On 21 February, Musgrove was issued with a breach notice and fined by St. George Illawarra after he was involved in an altercation with teammate Mikaele Ravalawa following the clubs Charity Shield loss to South Sydney in Mudgee. It was alleged that both players were heavily intoxicated after a night out of drinking following the game. Musgrove would play a total of 11 games for St. George Illawarra in the 2023 NRL season as they finished 16th. On 5 October 2023 it was reported that he had signed for Warrington on a two-year deal for the 2024 season.

=== 2024 ===
On 8 June, Musgrove played in Warrington's 2024 Challenge Cup final defeat against Wigan. Musgrove played 25 games for Warrington in the 2024 Super League season as the club reached the semi-final before losing to Hull Kingston Rovers.

=== 2025 ===
On 23 May 2025 it was reported that he had signed for Oldham RLFC in the RFL Championship on an 18-month deal. On 25 June, Musgrove was suspended for eight games after he was found guilty of using unacceptable language during the 2025 Challenge Cup semi-final whilst he was at Warrington. In August, Musgrove joined Bradford Bulls on a short-term deal for the rest of the season.

=== 2026 ===
In November 2026, Musgrove joined the Brisbane Broncos on a train-and-trial contract ahead of the 2027 NRL season. The agreement provided him an opportunity to train with the club during the pre-season and compete for a place on the Broncos' playing roster.

== Statistics ==
Season	Team	Games	Tries	Pts
2016	South Sydney Rabbitohs	6		
2017	South Sydney Rabbitohs	21		
2020	Wests Tigers	6	1	4
2021	Wests Tigers	5		
2022	Wests Tigers	24	2	8
2023	St. George Illawarra Dragons	11	1	4
2024	Warrington Wolves	16	1	4
2025	Warrington Wolves			
2025	Oldham RLFC	2		
2025	Bradford Bulls	5		
2027	Brisbane Broncos			
	Totals	91	5	20

== Assault allegations ==
In May 2018 Musgrove was involved in an argument with his former girlfriend, and on 11 July, faced charges of common assault, common assault domestic violence related, and intentionally or recklessly destroy/damage property. Musgrove pleaded not guilty. On 19 September, Musgrove pleaded guilty to damaging property and was fined $1,100 and ordered to pay $500 to fix the gate which Musgrove damaged after having an argument with his girlfriend. Musgrove also faced charges of domestic violence related common assault and assault, but both charges were withdrawn by prosecutors. In November Musgrove's sentence was overturned on appeal, and he was given a conditional release order and required to be on good behaviour.

In December 2018, Musgrove was charged by police for allegedly assaulting a woman at the Coogee Bay Hotel. Musgrove and Liam Coleman, son of former Souths player Craig Coleman were charged with an act of indecency and aggravated indecent assault. A woman made a complaint to security and a further complaint was made to Eastern Beaches police local area command. Musgrove attended Maroubra police station later that week where he was granted conditional bail. In January 2019 he pleaded not guilty to aggravated indecent assault, indecent assault and common assault.

On 21 October 2019, Musgrove was found guilty of assault with an act of indecency and sentenced to a 12-month intensive corrections order.

In April 2020, Musgrove had his assault conviction from 2019 overturned by the court.
