= Charlie Staines (rugby league) =

Samoa international rugby league footballer

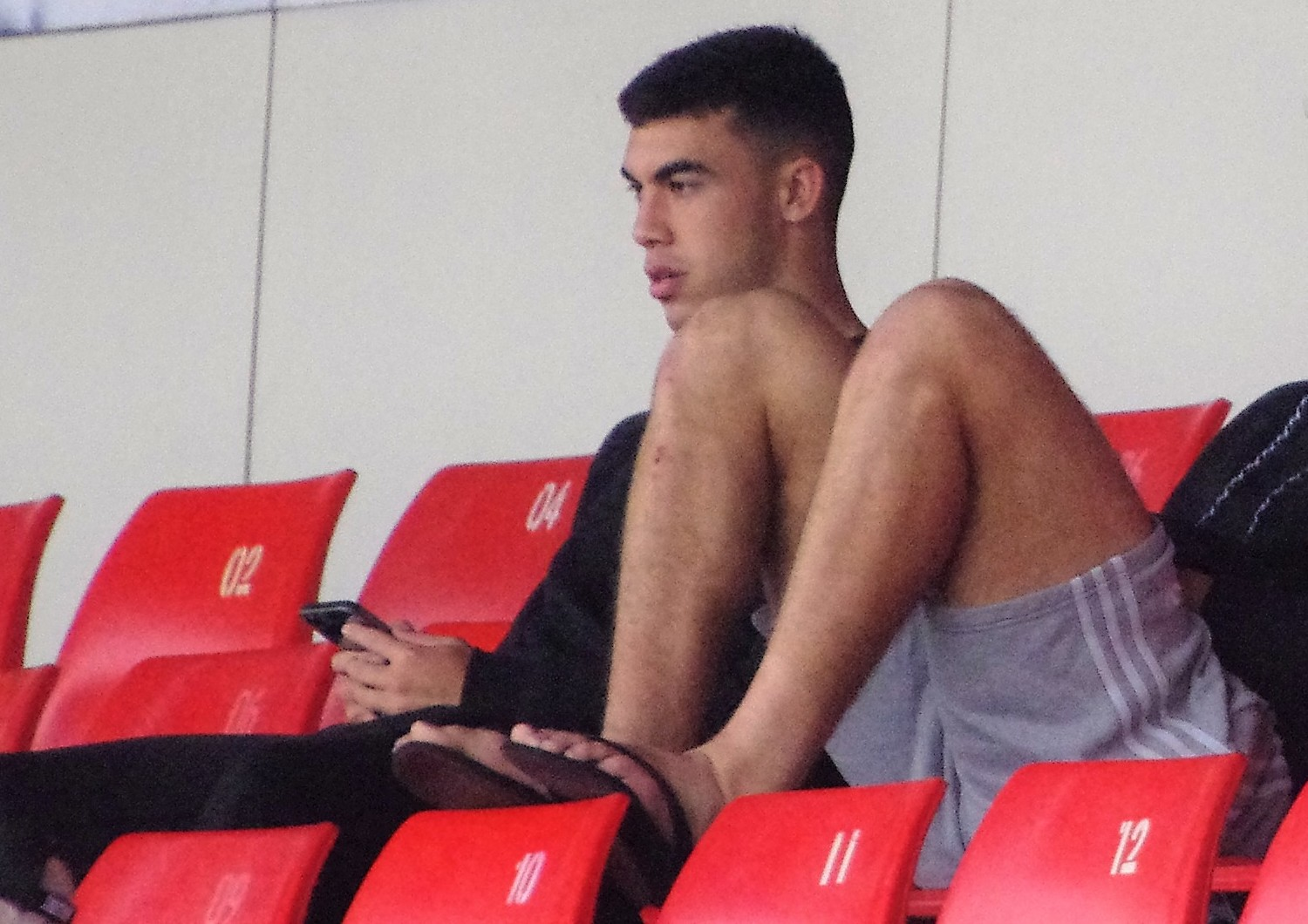

Personal information
- Born: 4 October 2000 (age 26) Forbes, New South Wales, Australia
- Height: 6 ft 0 in (1.84 m)
- Weight: 13 st 10 lb (87 kg)

Playing information
- Position: Wing, Fullback
Club
Years	Team	Pld	T	G	FG	P
2020–22	Penrith Panthers	39	23	0	0	92
2023–25	Wests Tigers	38	16	0	0	64
2026–	Catalans Dragons	27	13	0	0	52
	Total	104	52	0	0	208
Representative
Years	Team	Pld	T	G	FG	P
2022	Samoa	1	0	0	0	0
- Source: As of 24 February 2026

Charlie Staines (born 4 October 2000) is a Samoan international rugby league footballer who plays as a winger or fullback for the Catalans Dragons in the Super League.

He previously played in the NRL for the Wests Tigers and the Penrith Panthers, with whom he won the 2022 NRL Grand Final.

== Background ==
Staines was born in Forbes, New South Wales to Shane and Lisa Staines and is of Samoan descent through his grandfather. He was educated at Forbes High School.

Staines played his junior rugby league for the Forbes Magpies before being signed by the Penrith Panthers.

== Playing career ==
=== 2020 ===
On 11 July, Staines made his début in round 9 of the 2020 NRL season for Penrith against Cronulla-Sutherland Sharks. He went on to score four tries, only the sixth player since 1908 to score four or more tries on debut and the first player since 2008.

On 13 July, Staines was stood down by Penrith after breaking strict Coronavirus protocols. Staines had hosted a party at his residence where ten people were invited including members of his family.

In round 12, Staines scored two tries as Penrith defeated Manly 42-12 at Brookvale Oval. Staines became the first player in 83 years to score six tries from the opening two games in his career.

=== 2021 ===
In round 5 of the 2021 NRL season, Staines scored two tries for Penrith in a 30-10 victory over Canberra.

In round 9 against Cronulla-Sutherland, he scored a hat-trick in a 48-0 victory.

In round 10, he scored two tries for Penrith in a 48-12 victory over the Gold Coast. In round 12, he scored two tries in a 30-4 victory over the bottom placed Canterbury side.

In round 18, he scored two tries for Penrith in their victory over the New Zealand Warriors. Staines played a total of 21 games for Penrith in the 2021 NRL season but was not selected for Penrith's grand final team which defeated South Sydney to claim their third premiership.

=== 2022 ===
Staines spent most of the 2022 NRL season in the NSW Cup with Ivan Cleary deciding to go with Taylan May and Brian To'o as the preferred wing options. Staines was called into the Penrith side for the preliminary final against South Sydney as a replacement for the injured May. Staines later kept his place for the 2022 NRL Grand Final as May had not recovered from his hamstring injury. Staines played on the wing for Penrith in their grand final victory over Parramatta scoring a try in the second half. On 20 October, Staines joined the Wests Tigers in a swap deal with Tyrone Peachey.

=== 2023 ===
In round 1 of the 2023 NRL season, Staines made his club debut for the Wests Tigers in their 22-10 loss against the Gold Coast. Following the clubs round 8 loss to Manly, Staines was rushed to hospital with a small bowel perforation which required emergency surgery. Staines was later ruled out for twelve weeks. Staines was limited to only nine games for the Wests Tigers as the club finished with the wooden spoon for a second straight year.

=== 2024 ===
In round 8 of the 2024 NRL season, Staines scored two tries for the Wests Tigers in their 34-10 loss against Brisbane. Staines played a total of 22 games and scored nine tries for the Wests Tigers throughout the season as the club finished with the wooden spoon.

=== 2025 ===
In round 9 of the 2025 NRL season, Staines scored two tries for the Wests Tigers in their 34-28 victory over St. George Illawarra. On 22 August, Catalans Dragons announced that they had signed Staines from the 2026 season.

On 21 August 2025 it was reported that he had signed for Catalans in the Super League on a two-year deal.

=== 2026 ===
Staines made his club debut for Catalans in round 1 of the 2026 Super League season scoring a try in their 26-10 victory over Huddersfield.

== Statistics ==
Year	Team	Games	Tries	Pts
2020	Penrith Panthers	2	6	24
2021	Penrith Panthers	21	14	56
2022	Penrith Panthers	16	3	12
2023	Wests Tigers	9	3	12
2024	Wests Tigers	22	9	36
2025	Wests Tigers	3	2	8
2026	Catalans Dragons	0	0	0
	Totals	72	37	148
