= 2023 NRL season =

Australian rugby league season

2023 National Rugby League
- Duration: 2 March – 1 October 2023
- Teams: 17
- Premiers: Penrith Panthers (5th title)
- Minor premiers: Penrith Panthers (5th title)
- Matches played: 213
- Points scored: 9,646
- Average attendance: 19,186
- Attendance: 4,086,547
- Top points scorer: Jamayne Isaako (244)
- Wooden spoon: Wests Tigers (2nd spoon)
- Dally M Medal: Kalyn Ponga
- Top try-scorer: Dom Young (25)

The 2023 NRL season was the 116th season of professional rugby league in Australia and the 26th season run by the National Rugby League. The season consisted of 27 competition rounds, the longest in league history, followed by a finals series contested by the top eight teams on the competition table. The Penrith Panthers were the 2023 minor and major premiers.

== Teams ==
For the 2023 season, the number of teams in the NRL increased from sixteen to seventeen with the inclusion of a fourth Queensland-based club, the Dolphins, based at Redcliffe. It is the first time the number of Premiership teams has changed since 2007 when the Gold Coast Titans joined the competition.

Colours	Club	Season	Home ground(s)	Head coach	Captain(s)
	Brisbane Broncos	36th season	Suncorp Stadium	Kevin Walters	Adam Reynolds
	Canberra Raiders	42nd season	GIO Stadium Canberra	Ricky Stuart	Jarrod Croker & Elliott Whitehead
	Canterbury-Bankstown Bulldogs	89th season	Accor Stadium & CommBank Stadium	Cameron Ciraldo	Raymond Faitala-Mariner, Matt Burton, & Reed Mahoney
	Cronulla-Sutherland Sharks	57th season	PointsBet Stadium	Craig Fitzgibbon	Wade Graham & Dale Finucane
	Dolphins	1st season	Suncorp Stadium, Kayo Stadium, & Sunshine Coast Stadium	Wayne Bennett	Jesse Bromwich
	Gold Coast Titans	17th season	Cbus Super Stadium	~~Justin Holbrook~~ → Jim Lenihan (interim)	Tino Fa'asuamaleaui
	Manly Warringah Sea Eagles	74th season	4 Pines Park	Anthony Seibold	Daly Cherry-Evans
	Melbourne Storm	26th season	AAMI Park	Craig Bellamy	Christian Welch
	Newcastle Knights	36th season	McDonald Jones Stadium	Adam O'Brien	Jayden Brailey & Kalyn Ponga
	New Zealand Warriors	29th season	Go Media Stadium Mt. Smart	Andrew Webster	Tohu Harris
	North Queensland Cowboys	29th season	Queensland Country Bank Stadium	Todd Payten	Jason Taumalolo & Chad Townsend
	Parramatta Eels	77th season	CommBank Stadium	Brad Arthur	Clint Gutherson & Junior Paulo
	Penrith Panthers	57th season	BlueBet Stadium	Ivan Cleary	Isaah Yeo & Nathan Cleary
	South Sydney Rabbitohs	114th season	Accor Stadium	Jason Demetriou	Cameron Murray
	St. George Illawarra Dragons	25th season	Netstrata Jubilee Stadium & WIN Stadium	~~Anthony Griffin~~ → Ryan Carr (interim)	Ben Hunt
	Sydney Roosters	116th season	Allianz Stadium	Trent Robinson	James Tedesco
	Wests Tigers	24th season	Leichhardt Oval, Campbelltown Sports Stadium & CommBank Stadium	Tim Sheens	Apisai Koroisau

== Collective bargaining agreement issues ==
The start of the season was overshadowed by ongoing issues between the NRL and the Rugby League Players Association (RLPA). By February 2023, the RLPA and the NRL were at a stalemate following the expiration of the previous collective bargaining agreement in November 2022.

The NRL had announced an increased salary cap on 23 December 2022, surprising the RLPA who had yet to agree to terms with the NRL.

By February 2023, the possibility of a player's strike or other industrial action had yet to be ruled out by the RLPA.

In response to the stalled negotiations over the new agreement, in early July the RLPA took industrial action with players boycotting almost all broadcast and media engagements. The RLPA later publishing a list of frequently asked questions in response to media reporting.

In Round 22, the players took further action by covering the NRL logo on their jerseys.

== Pre-season ==
Pre-season in 2023 saw the introduction of the NRL Pre-season Challenge in attempt to ensure each team had played an even number of matches before the start of the season. The annual All Stars match was still played, however the Pre-season Challenge saw a vast reduction in the number of trial played. As the 2023 World Club Challenge was hosted in Australia, the competition was incorporated into the final week of the Pre-season Challenge, which also resulted in St Helens participating in the NRL Pre-season Challenge in both weeks.

Matches were played between 4 February and 19 February 2023, before a 11-day lead up until the beginning of the regular season.

=== All Stars match ===
Rotorua hosted the All Stars match, which was the first time the match was played in New Zealand.

11 February 2023
17:50 NZDT (UTC+13:00)

Māori All Stars (Māori people)	24–28	Indigenous All Stars
	Report

Rotorua International Stadium, Rotorua
Attendance: 17,644
Referee: Gerard Sutton

=== Trials ===
Italics indicates a non-NRL club

Date	Time	Home	Score	Away	Stadium	Attendance	Report
4 February 2023	16:00 AEST (UTC+10:00)	Wynnum Manly Seagulls	12–44	Brisbane Broncos	Kougari Oval, Brisbane		Report
4 February 2023	19:00 AEST (UTC+10:00)	Central Queensland Capras	8–24	Dolphins	Marley Brown Oval, Gladstone	4,500	Report

== Regular season ==
=== Results ===
Team	1	2	3	4	5	6	7	8	9	10	11	12	13	14	15	16	17	18	19	20	21	22	23	24	25	26	27	F1	F2	F3	GF
Brisbane Broncos	PEN +1	**NQL** **+12**	**SGI** **+22**	DOL +6	**WTI** **+34**	**CAN** **−6**	GCT +17	PAR +10	**SOU** **−26**	MAN +26	MEL −8	**PEN** **−11**	NZL +4	CRO +8	**NEW** **+4**	X	**GCT** **−6**	**DOL** **+8**	X	CBY +20	SOU +16	**SYD** **+22**	NQL +16	**PAR** **+44**	X	CAN +11	**MEL** **−10**	**MEL** **+26**	X	**NZL** **+30**	PEN –2
Canberra Raiders	NQL −1	DOL −6	**CRO** **+4**	NEW −10	**PEN** **−41**	BRI +6	**SGI** **+6**	X	**DOL** **+1***	CBY +4	**PAR** **+8**	**MAN** **−28**	SOU +7	WTI +1	**NZL** **−22**	X	SYD +2	**GCT** **+4**	SGI +10	X	NZL −1*	**NEW** **−22**	**WTI** **+4**	MEL −46	**CBY** **+12**	**BRI** **−11**	CRO −18	NEW −2			
Canterbury-Bankstown Bulldogs	MAN −25	MEL +14	**WTI** **+4**	NZL −2	**NQL** **+1***	**SOU** **−34**	PAR −26	**CRO** **−13**	SGI +2	**CAN** **−4**	**NZL** **−12**	**GCT** **+2**	X	SYD −1	**PAR** **−22**	CRO −38	X	**NEW** **−66**	SOU +4	**BRI** **−20**	PEN −26	**DOL** **+1**	X	NEW −36	CAN −12	**MAN** **−18**	GCT −4				
Cronulla-Sutherland Sharks	**SOU** **−9**	PAR +4	CAN −4	SGI +32	**NZL** **−2**	X	**SYD** **+10**	CBY +13	**NQL** **+38**	**DOL** **−20**	MAN +6	**NEW** **+20**	X	**BRI** **−8**	MEL −44	**CBY** **+38**	X	**SGI** **+36**	WTI +24	NZL −32	**MAN** **−4**	PEN −28	SOU +10	**GCT** **+30**	NQL +20	NEW −26	**CAN** **+18**	**SYD** **−1**			
Dolphins	**SYD** **+10**	**CAN** **+6**	NEW +16	**BRI** **−6**	SGI −26	NQL +10	**SOU** **−22**	**GCT** **+2**	CAN −1*	CRO +20	X	**MEL** **−8**	**SGI** **+14**	NZL −22	MAN −40	X	**PAR** **−28**	BRI −8	GCT +2*	**PEN** **−10**	X	CBY −1	**NEW** **−2**	SYD −16	WTI −1	**NQL** **−24**	**NZL** **+24**				
Gold Coast Titans	WTI +12	SGI −14	**MEL** **+4**	NQL −12	X	**SGI** **+2**	**BRI** **−17**	DOL −2	MAN +16	**PAR** **+2**	NEW −20	CBY −2	X	**SOU** **−18**	**WTI** **+16**	X	BRI +6	CAN −4	**DOL** **−2***	PAR −1	**SYD** **−18**	**NQL** **+9**	**NZL** **−10**	CRO −30	**PEN** **−26**	MEL −21	**CBY** **+4**				
Manly Warringah Sea Eagles	**CBY** **+25**	X	**PAR** **+4**	SOU −1*	**NEW**; **0***	PEN −32	**MEL** **+10**	WTI +6	**GCT** **−16**	**BRI** **−26**	**CRO** **−6**	CAN +28	NEW −10	X	**DOL** **+40**	PAR −30	MEL −18	**SYD** **+2**	X	**NQL** **−11**	CRO +4	SGI +6	SYD −10	**PEN** **−12**	NZL −7	CBY +18	**WTI** **+42**				
Melbourne Storm	PAR +4*	**CBY** **−14**	GCT −4	**WTI** **+12**	SOU +8	**SYD** **+20**	MAN −10	**NZL** **+8**	X	**SOU** **−16**	**BRI** **+8**	DOL +8	X	NQL −25	**CRO** **+44**	WTI +22	**MAN** **+18**	**PEN** **−18**	X	SYD +14	NEW −8	**PAR** **+30**	PEN −20	**CAN** **+46**	SGI +10	**GCT** **+21**	BRI +10	BRI −26	**SYD** **+5**	PEN −34	
Newcastle Knights	NZL −8	WTI +2	**DOL** **−16**	**CAN** **+10**	MAN; 0*	**NZL** **+10**	**PEN** **−1***	NQL −2	PAR −31	X	**GCT** **+20**	CRO −20	**MAN** **+10**	X	BRI −4	**SYD** **−2**	PEN −8	CBY +66	X	**WTI** **+16**	**MEL** **+8**	CAN +22	DOL +2	**CBY** **+36**	**SOU** **+19**	**CRO** **+26**	SGI +20	**CAN** **+2**	NZL −30		
New Zealand Warriors	**NEW** **+8**	SYD −8	NQL +14	**CBY** **+2**	CRO +2	NEW −10	**NQL** **+8**	MEL −8	**SYD** **−14**	**PEN** **−12**	CBY +12	X	**BRI** **−4**	**DOL** **+22**	CAN +22	X	SGI +30	**SOU** **−22**	PAR +36	**CRO** **+32**	**CAN** **+1***	X	GCT +10	WTI +8	**MAN** **+7**	**SGI** **+12**	DOL −24	PEN −26	**NEW** **+30**	BRI −30	
North Queensland Cowboys	**CAN** **+1**	BRI −12	**NZL** **−14**	**GCT** **+12**	CBY −1*	**DOL** **−10**	NZL −8	**NEW** **+2**	CRO −38	SYD +14	**SGI** **+20**	WTI −48	PAR −8	**MEL** **+25**	X	**PEN** **+4***	SOU +25	**WTI** **+74**	X	MAN +11	**PAR** **+8**	GCT −9	**BRI** **−16**	X	**CRO** **−20**	DOL +24	PEN −32				
Parramatta Eels	**MEL** **−4***	**CRO** **−4**	MAN −4	**PEN** **+1***	SYD −8	WTI +6	**CBY** **+26**	**BRI** **−10**	**NEW** **+31**	GCT −2	CAN −8	SOU +20	**NQL** **+8**	X	CBY +22	**MAN** **+30**	DOL +28	X	**NZL** **−36**	**GCT** **+1**	NQL −8	MEL −30	**SGI** **+6**	BRI −44	**SYD** **−22**	PEN +14	X				
Penrith Panthers	**BRI** **−1**	**SOU** **+6**	X	PAR −1*	CAN +41	**MAN** **+32**	NEW +1*	SOU −2	**WTI** **−4**	NZL +12	**SYD** **+44**	BRI +11	X	**SGI** **+8**	SYD +24	NQL −4*	**NEW** **+8**	MEL +18	X	DOL +10	**CBY** **+26**	**CRO** **+28**	**MEL** **+20**	MAN +12	GCT +26	**PAR** **−14**	**NQL** **+32**	**NZL** **+26**	X	**MEL** **+34**	**BRI** **+2**
South Sydney Rabbitohs	CRO +9	PEN −6	SYD −2	**MAN** **+1***	**MEL** **−8**	CBY +34	DOL +22	**PEN** **+2**	BRI +26	MEL +16	**WTI** **+20**	**PAR** **−20**	**CAN** **−7**	GCT +18	SGI −6	X	**NQL** **−25**	NZL +22	**CBY** **−4**	X	**BRI** **−16**	WTI +14	**CRO** **−10**	**SGI** **+12**	NEW −19	X	**SYD** **−14**				
St. George Illawarra Dragons	X	**GCT** **+14**	BRI −22	**CRO** **−32**	**DOL** **+26**	GCT −2	CAN −6	SYD −1	**CBY** **−2**	WTI −2	NQL −20	**SYD** **+2**	**DOL** **−14**	PEN −8	**SOU** **+6**	X	**NZL** **−30**	CRO −36	**CAN** **−10**	X	**WTI** **+4**	**MAN** **−6**	PAR −6	SOU −12	**MEL** **−10**	NZL −12	**NEW** **−20**				
Sydney Roosters	DOL −10	**NZL** **+8**	**SOU** **+2**	X	**PAR** **+8**	MEL −20	CRO −10	**SGI** **+1**	NZL +14	**NQL** **−14**	PEN −44	SGI −2	X	**CBY** **+1**	**PEN** **−24**	NEW +2	**CAN** **−2**	MAN −2	X	**MEL** **−14**	GCT +18	BRI −22	**MAN** **+10**	**DOL** **+16**	PAR +22	**WTI** **+24**	SOU +14	CRO +1	MEL −5		
Wests Tigers	**GCT** **−12**	**NEW** **−2**	CBY −4	MEL −12	BRI −34	**PAR** **−6**	X	**MAN** **−6**	PEN +4	**SGI** **+2**	SOU −20	**NQL** **+48**	X	**CAN** **−1**	GCT −16	**MEL** **−22**	X	NQL −74	**CRO** **−24**	NEW −16	SGI −4	**SOU** **−14**	CAN −4	**NZL** **−8**	**DOL** **+1**	SYD −24	MAN −42				
Team	1	2	3	4	5	6	7	8	9	10	11	12	13	14	15	16	17	18	19	20	21	22	23	24	25	26	27	F1	F2	F3	GF

Bold – Home game
X – Bye
* – Golden point game
Opponent for round listed above margin

== Ladder ==
2023 NRL season
Pos	Team	Pld	W	D	L	B	PF	PA	PD	Pts
1	Penrith Panthers (P)	24	18	0	6	3	645	312	+333	42
2	Brisbane Broncos	24	18	0	6	3	639	425	+214	42
3	Melbourne Storm	24	16	0	8	3	627	459	+168	38
4	New Zealand Warriors	24	16	0	8	3	572	448	+124	38
5	Newcastle Knights	24	14	1	9	3	626	451	+175	35
6	Cronulla-Sutherland Sharks	24	14	0	10	3	619	497	+122	34
7	Sydney Roosters	24	13	0	11	3	472	496	−24	32
8	Canberra Raiders	24	13	0	11	3	486	623	−137	32
9	South Sydney Rabbitohs	24	12	0	12	3	564	505	+59	30
10	Parramatta Eels	24	12	0	12	3	587	574	+13	30
11	North Queensland Cowboys	24	12	0	12	3	546	542	+4	30
12	Manly Warringah Sea Eagles	24	11	1	12	3	545	539	+6	29
13	Dolphins	24	9	0	15	3	520	631	−111	24
14	Gold Coast Titans	24	9	0	15	3	527	653	−126	24
15	Canterbury-Bankstown Bulldogs	24	7	0	17	3	438	769	−331	20
16	St. George Illawarra Dragons	24	5	0	19	3	474	673	−199	16
17	Wests Tigers	24	4	0	20	3	385	675	−290	14

=== Ladder progression ===
- Numbers highlighted in green indicate that the team finished the round inside the top eight.
- Numbers highlighted in blue indicates the team finished first on the ladder in that round.
- Numbers highlighted in red indicates the team finished last place on the ladder in that round.
- Underlined numbers indicate that the team had a bye during that round.

	Team	1	2	3	4	5	6	7	8	9	10	11	12	13	14	15	16	17	18	19	20	21	22	23	24	25	26	27
1	Penrith Panthers	0	2	4	4	6	8	10	10	10	12	14	16	18	20	22	22	24	26	28	30	32	34	36	38	40	40	42
2	Brisbane Broncos	2	4	6	8	10	10	12	14	14	16	16	16	18	20	22	24	24	26	28	30	32	34	36	38	40	42	42
3	Melbourne Storm	2	2	2	4	6	8	8	10	12	12	14	16	18	18	20	22	24	24	26	28	28	30	30	32	34	36	38
4	New Zealand Warriors	2	2	4	6	8	8	10	10	10	10	12	14	14	16	18	20	22	22	24	26	28	30	32	34	36	38	38
5	Newcastle Knights	0	2	2	4	5	7	7	7	7	9	11	11	13	15	15	15	15	17	19	21	23	25	27	29	31	33	35
6	Cronulla-Sutherland Sharks	0	2	2	4	4	6	8	10	12	12	14	16	18	18	18	20	22	24	26	26	26	26	28	30	32	32	34
7	Sydney Roosters	0	2	4	6	8	8	8	10	12	12	12	12	14	16	16	18	18	18	20	20	22	22	24	26	28	30	32
8	Canberra Raiders	0	0	2	2	2	4	6	8	10	12	14	14	16	18	18	20	22	24	26	28	28	28	30	30	32	32	32
9	South Sydney Rabbitohs	2	2	2	4	4	6	8	10	12	14	16	16	16	18	18	20	20	22	22	24	24	26	26	28	28	30	30
10	Parramatta Eels	0	0	0	2	2	4	6	6	8	8	8	10	12	14	16	18	20	22	22	24	24	24	26	26	26	28	30
11	North Queensland Cowboys	2	2	2	4	4	4	4	6	6	8	10	10	10	12	14	16	18	20	22	24	26	26	26	28	28	30	30
12	Manly Warringah Sea Eagles	2	4	6	6	7	7	9	11	11	11	11	13	13	15	17	17	17	19	21	21	23	25	25	25	25	27	29
13	Dolphins	2	4	6	6	6	8	8	10	10	12	14	14	16	16	16	18	18	18	20	20	22	22	22	22	22	22	24
14	Gold Coast Titans	2	2	4	4	6	8	8	8	10	12	12	12	14	14	16	18	20	20	20	20	20	22	22	22	22	22	24
15	Canterbury-Bankstown Bulldogs	0	2	4	4	6	6	6	6	8	8	8	10	12	12	12	12	14	14	16	16	16	18	20	20	20	20	20
16	St. George Illawarra Dragons	2	4	4	4	6	6	6	6	6	6	6	8	8	8	10	12	12	12	12	14	16	16	16	16	16	16	16
17	Wests Tigers	0	0	0	0	0	0	2	2	4	6	6	8	10	10	10	10	12	12	12	12	12	12	12	12	14	14	14

== Finals series ==
Home	Score	Away	Match Information
Home	Score	Away	Date and time (Local)	Venue	Referee	Crowd
Qualifying and Elimination Finals
Brisbane Broncos	26–0	Melbourne Storm	8 September, 7:50 pm	Suncorp Stadium	Grant Atkins	50,157
Penrith Panthers	32–6	New Zealand Warriors	9 September, 4:05 pm	BlueBet Stadium	Adam Gee	21,525
Cronulla-Sutherland Sharks	12–13	Sydney Roosters	9 September, 7:50 pm	PointsBet Stadium	Gerard Sutton	12,557
Newcastle Knights †	30–28	Canberra Raiders	10 September, 4:05 pm	McDonald Jones Stadium	Ashley Klein	29,548
Semi Finals
Melbourne Storm	18–13	Sydney Roosters	15 September, 7:50 pm	AAMI Park	Ashley Klein	19,534
New Zealand Warriors	40–10	Newcastle Knights	16 September, 6:05 pm	Go Media Stadium	Adam Gee	26,083
Preliminary Finals
Penrith Panthers	38–4	Melbourne Storm	22 September, 7:50 pm	Accor Stadium	Adam Gee	35,578
Brisbane Broncos	42–12	New Zealand Warriors	23 September, 7:50 pm	Suncorp Stadium	Gerard Sutton	52,273

† Match decided in extra time.

=== Chart ===
Qualifying and elimination finals
9 September – Sydney
1	Penrith	32
4	New Zealand	6
10 September – Newcastle
5	Newcastle	30
8	Canberra	28
9 September – Sydney
6	Cronulla-Sutherland	12
7	Sydney	13
8 September – Brisbane
2	Brisbane	26
3	Melbourne	0

Semi-finals
16 September – Auckland
New Zealand	40
Newcastle	10
15 September – Melbourne
Melbourne	18
Sydney	13

Preliminary finals
22 September – Sydney
Penrith	38
Melbourne	4
23 September – Brisbane
Brisbane	42
New Zealand	12

Grand final
1 October – Sydney
Penrith	26
Brisbane	24

== Grand final ==
2023 NRL Grand Final

Sunday, 1 October
19:30 AEDT (UTC+11)

Penrith Panthers	26 – 24	Brisbane Broncos
Tries: 4 Kenny 17'; Leota 62'; Crichton 67'; Cleary 76'; Goals: 5 Crichton 18' (1/1); Cleary pen 29', 63', 68', 78' (4/4)	1st: 8–6; 2nd: 18–18; Report	Tries: 4 Flegler 38'; Mam 44', 52', 54'; Goals: 4 Reynolds 39', 45', 53', 56' (4/4)

Accor Stadium, Sydney
Attendance: 81,947
Referee: Adam Gee
Video referee: Ashley Klein
Touch judges: Chris Sutton, Dave Munro
Clive Churchill Medal: Nathan Cleary (Penrith)

== Player statistics and records ==
- In Round 10, Wayne Bennett became the first coach to coach 900 games in the NRL and its predecessor competitions.
- In Round 22, Cameron McInnes broke the record for the most tackles in a game in the NRL era (1998–present) with 81.
- In the Grand Final, Ezra Mam tied the record for most tries by a five-eighth in a season, with 18.

The following statistics are as of the conclusion of Round 27.

Top 5 point scorers

Points	Player	Club	Tries	Goals	Field Goals
244	Jamayne Isaako	Dolphins	24	73	2
216	Nick Meaney	Melbourne Storm	10	88	0
183	Nicho Hynes	Cronulla-Sutherland Sharks	5	81	1
182	Adam Reynolds	Brisbane Broncos	5	79	3
176	Shaun Johnson	New Zealand Warriors	8	71	2

Top 5 try scorers

Tries	Player	Club
24	Jamayne Isaako	Dolphins
23	Dominic Young	Newcastle Knights
21	Dallin Watene-Zelezniak	New Zealand Warriors
21	Alex Johnston	South Sydney Rabbitohs
21	Mikaele Ravalawa	St. George Illawarra Dragons

Top 5 goal kickers

Goals	Player	Club
88	Nick Meaney	Melbourne Storm
81	Nicho Hynes	Cronulla-Sutherland Sharks
79	Adam Reynolds	Brisbane Broncos
73	Jamayne Isaako	Dolphins
72	Nathan Cleary	Penrith

Top 5 tacklers

Tackles	Player	Club
1,015	Blayke Brailey	Cronulla-Sutherland Sharks
1,014	Damien Cook	South Sydney Rabbitohs
986	Reed Mahoney	Canterbury-Bankstown Bulldogs
968	Nat Butcher	Sydney Roosters
956	J'maine Hopgood	Parramatta Eels
956	Reece Robson	North Queensland Cowboys

== Attendances ==
=== Club figures ===
Team	Games	Total	Average	Highest
Brisbane Broncos	12	405,500	33,792	43,271
Canberra Raiders	12	178,755	14,314	21,082
Canterbury-Bankstown Bulldogs	11*	178,675	16,243	35,211
Cronulla-Sutherland Sharks	11*	121,051	11,005	12,757
Dolphins	12	310,520	25,877	51,047
Gold Coast Titans	11*	187,600	17,055	26,563
Manly Warringah Sea Eagles	11*	145,530	13,230	17,385
Melbourne Storm	11*	201,082	18,280	26,829
New Zealand Warriors	11*	234,075	21,280	25,095
Newcastle Knights	12	255,748	21,312	29,423
North Queensland Cowboys	12	230,098	19,175	22,811
Parramatta Eels	12	219,773	18,314	27,655
Penrith Panthers	12	226,081	18,840	21,525
South Sydney Rabbitohs	12	236,807	19,734	45,814
St. George Illawarra Dragons	11*	142,403	12,945	17,357
Sydney Roosters	11*	229,699	20,882	40,191
Wests Tigers	12	152,521	13,866	28,611

* = Magic Round home game not counted

=== Top regular season crowds ===
Rank	Home team	Away team	Crowd	Venue	City	Round
1	Dolphins	Brisbane Broncos	51,047	Suncorp Stadium	Brisbane	4
2	Dolphins	Newcastle Knights	45,814	Optus Stadium	Perth	23
2	South Sydney Rabbitohs	Cronulla-Sutherland Sharks	45,814	Optus Stadium	Perth	23
3	Brisbane Broncos	Melbourne Storm	43,271	Suncorp Stadium	Brisbane	27
4	Brisbane Broncos	North Queensland Cowboys	43,162	Suncorp Stadium	Brisbane	2
5	Brisbane Broncos	Gold Coast Titans	42,249	Suncorp Stadium	Brisbane	17
6	Sydney Roosters	St. George Illawarra Dragons	40,191	Allianz Stadium	Sydney	8
7	Brisbane Broncos	South Sydney Rabbitohs	40,102	Suncorp Stadium	Brisbane	9
8	Sydney Roosters	South Sydney Rabbitohs	36,669	Allianz Stadium	Sydney	3
9	South Sydney Rabbitohs	Sydney Roosters	36,263	Accor Stadium	Sydney	27
10	Brisbane Broncos	Newcastle Knights	35,814	Suncorp Stadium	Brisbane	15
11	Dolphins	New Zealand Warriors	35,438	Suncorp Stadium	Brisbane	27
12	Canterbury-Bankstown Bulldogs	South Sydney Rabbitohs	35,211	Accor Stadium	Sydney	6
13	Canterbury-Bankstown Bulldogs	Parramatta Eels	33,866	Accor Stadium	Sydney	15
14	Dolphins	North Queensland Cowboys	33,449	Suncorp Stadium	Brisbane	26
15	Brisbane Broncos	Penrith Panthers	33,343	Suncorp Stadium	Brisbane	12
16	Dolphins	Sydney Roosters	32,177	Suncorp Stadium	Brisbane	1
17	Brisbane Broncos	Canberra Raiders	31,962	Suncorp Stadium	Brisbane	6
18	Brisbane Broncos	Dolphins	30,606	The Gabba	Brisbane	18
19	Wests Tigers	Parramatta Eels	28,611	Accor Stadium	Sydney	6
20	Dolphins	Melbourne Storm	28,325	Suncorp Stadium	Brisbane	12
21	Parramatta Eels	Canterbury-Bankstown Bulldogs	27,655	CommBank Stadium	Sydney	7
22	Brisbane Broncos	Wests Tigers	27,533	Suncorp Stadium	Brisbane	5
23	South Sydney Rabbitohs	Parramatta Eels	27,432	Allianz Stadium	Sydney	12
24	Melbourne Storm	Penrith Panthers	26,829	Marvel Stadium	Melbourne	18
25	Brisbane Broncos	St. George Illawarra Dragons	26,612	Suncorp Stadium	Brisbane	3

=== Magic Round (Round 10) ===
Home team	Away team	Date	Time	Venue	Match Figure	Day Total
Canterbury-Bankstown Bulldogs	Canberra Raiders	Friday, 5 May	6:00 pm	Suncorp Stadium	41,462	50,077
Manly Warringah Sea Eagles	Brisbane Broncos	Friday, 5 May	8:05 pm	Suncorp Stadium	50,077	50,077
New Zealand Warriors	Penrith Panthers	Saturday, 6 May	3:00 pm	Suncorp Stadium	38,035	50,183
Cronulla-Sutherland Sharks	Dolphins	Saturday, 6 May	5:30 pm	Suncorp Stadium	48,068	50,183
Melbourne Storm	South Sydney Rabbitohs	Saturday, 6 May	7:45 pm	Suncorp Stadium	50,183	50,183
St. George Illawarra Dragons	Wests Tigers	Sunday, 7 May	1:50 pm	Suncorp Stadium	34,568	46,845
Sydney Roosters	North Queensland Cowboys	Sunday, 7 May	4:00 pm	Suncorp Stadium	45,085	46,845
Gold Coast Titans	Parramatta Eels	Sunday, 7 May	6:25 pm	Suncorp Stadium	46,845	46,845
Bye: Newcastle Knights

=== Finals ===
Rank	Home team	Away team	Crowd	Venue	City
1	Penrith Panthers	Brisbane Broncos	81,947	Accor Stadium	Sydney
2	Brisbane Broncos	New Zealand Warriors	52,273	Suncorp Stadium	Brisbane
3	Brisbane Broncos	Melbourne Storm	50,197	Suncorp Stadium	Brisbane
4	Penrith Panthers	Melbourne Storm	35,578	Accor Stadium	Sydney
5	Newcastle Knights	Canberra Raiders	29,548	McDonald Jones Stadium	Newcastle
6	New Zealand Warriors	Newcastle Knights	26,083	Go Media Stadium	Auckland
7	Penrith Panthers	New Zealand Warriors	21,525	BlueBet Stadium	Sydney
8	Melbourne Storm	Sydney Roosters	19,534	AAMI Park	Melbourne
9	Cronulla-Sutherland Sharks	Sydney Roosters	12,557	PointsBet Stadium	Sydney

== Match Officials ==
- Includes Finals Matches

Referee	Games
Adam Gee	29
Gerard Sutton	27
Grant Atkins	25
Ashley Klein	24
Peter Gough	23
Todd Smith	23
Chris Butler	20
Ben Cummins	15
Liam Kennedy	10
Chris Sutton	10
Ziggy Przeklasa-Adamski	5
Kasey Badger	1
Belinda Sharpe	1

== 2023 Transfers ==
=== Players ===
Player	2022 Club	2023 Club
Tyson Gamble	Brisbane Broncos	Newcastle Knights
Ryan James	Brisbane Broncos	Retirement
Albert Kelly	Brisbane Broncos	Redcliffe Dolphins (Hostplus Cup)
Rhys Kennedy	Brisbane Broncos	Hull Kingston Rovers (Super League)
Brenko Lee	Brisbane Broncos	Dolphins
Te Maire Martin	Brisbane Broncos	New Zealand Warriors
Tesi Niu	Brisbane Broncos	Dolphins
Tyrone Roberts	Brisbane Broncos	Burleigh Bears (Hostplus Cup)
Jake Turpin	Brisbane Broncos	Sydney Roosters
Adam Elliott	Canberra Raiders	Newcastle Knights
Josh Hodgson	Canberra Raiders	Parramatta Eels
Charnze Nicoll-Klokstad	Canberra Raiders	New Zealand Warriors
Ryan Sutton	Canberra Raiders	Canterbury-Bankstown Bulldogs
Semi Valemei	Canberra Raiders	North Queensland Cowboys
Corey Allan	Canterbury-Bankstown Bulldogs	Sydney Roosters
Jack Hetherington	Canterbury-Bankstown Bulldogs	Newcastle Knights
Josh Jackson	Canterbury-Bankstown Bulldogs	Retirement
Jeremy Marshall-King	Canterbury-Bankstown Bulldogs	Dolphins
Aaron Schoupp	Canterbury-Bankstown Bulldogs	Gold Coast Titans
Ava Seumanufagai	Canterbury-Bankstown Bulldogs	Leigh Leopards (Super League)
Joe Stimson	Canterbury-Bankstown Bulldogs	Gold Coast Titans
Paul Vaughan	Canterbury-Bankstown Bulldogs	Warrington Wolves (Super League)
Brandon Wakeham	Canterbury-Bankstown Bulldogs	Wests Tigers
Andrew Fifita	Cronulla-Sutherland Sharks	Retirement
Aiden Tolman	Cronulla-Sutherland Sharks	Retirement
Herman Ese'ese	Gold Coast Titans	Dolphins
Patrick Herbert	Gold Coast Titans	N/A
Jamayne Isaako	Gold Coast Titans	Dolphins
Sam Lisone	Gold Coast Titans	Leeds Rhinos (Super League)
Esan Marsters	Gold Coast Titans	Huddersfield Giants (Super League)
Greg Marzhew	Gold Coast Titans	Newcastle Knights
Kevin Proctor	Gold Coast Titans	Wakefield Trinity (Super League)
Corey Thompson	Gold Coast Titans	Brisbane Tigers (Hostplus Cup)
Jarrod Wallace	Gold Coast Titans	Dolphins
Andrew Davey	Manly Warringah Sea Eagles	Canterbury-Bankstown Bulldogs
Kieran Foran	Manly Warringah Sea Eagles	Gold Coast Titans
James Segeyaro	Manly Warringah Sea Eagles	Lézignan Sangliers (Elite One Championship)
Jorge Taufua	Manly Warringah Sea Eagles	Wakefield Trinity (Super League)
Martin Taupau	Manly Warringah Sea Eagles	Brisbane Broncos
Dylan Walker	Manly Warringah Sea Eagles	New Zealand Warriors
Jesse Bromwich	Melbourne Storm	Dolphins
Kenny Bromwich	Melbourne Storm	Dolphins
Felise Kaufusi	Melbourne Storm	Dolphins
Brandon Smith	Melbourne Storm	Sydney Roosters
Mitch Barnett	Newcastle Knights	New Zealand Warriors
Jake Clifford	Newcastle Knights	Hull F.C. (Super League)
Tex Hoy	Newcastle Knights	Hull F.C. (Super League)
David Klemmer	Newcastle Knights	Wests Tigers
Edrick Lee	Newcastle Knights	Dolphins
Anthony Milford	Newcastle Knights	Dolphins
Chris Randall	Newcastle Knights	Gold Coast Titans
Pasami Saulo	Newcastle Knights	Canberra Raiders
Sauaso Sue	Newcastle Knights	Hull Kingston Rovers (Super League)
Euan Aitken	New Zealand Warriors	Dolphins
Jesse Arthars	New Zealand Warriors	Brisbane Broncos
Chanel Harris-Tavita	New Zealand Warriors	Hiatus
Eliesa Katoa	New Zealand Warriors	Melbourne Storm
Dunamis Lui	New Zealand Warriors	Redcliffe Dolphins (Hostplus Cup)
Jack Murchie	New Zealand Warriors	Parramatta Eels
Ben Murdoch-Masila	New Zealand Warriors	St. George Illawarra Dragons
Aaron Pene	New Zealand Warriors	Melbourne Storm
Ashley Taylor	New Zealand Warriors	Retirement
Reece Walsh	New Zealand Warriors	Brisbane Broncos
Tom Gilbert	North Queensland Cowboys	Dolphins
Connelly Lemuelu	North Queensland Cowboys	Dolphins
Hamiso Tabuai-Fidow	North Queensland Cowboys	Dolphins
Nathan Brown	Parramatta Eels	Sydney Roosters
Oregon Kaufusi	Parramatta Eels	Cronulla-Sutherland Sharks
Reed Mahoney	Parramatta Eels	Canterbury-Bankstown Bulldogs
Marata Niukore	Parramatta Eels	New Zealand Warriors
Tom Opacic	Parramatta Eels	Hull Kingston Rovers (Super League)
Isaiah Papali'i	Parramatta Eels	Wests Tigers
Mitch Rein	Parramatta Eels	Retirement
Ray Stone	Parramatta Eels	Dolphins
Christian Crichton	Penrith Panthers	N/A
Robert Jennings	Penrith Panthers	Dolphins
Viliame Kikau	Penrith Panthers	Canterbury-Bankstown Bulldogs
Apisai Koroisau	Penrith Panthers	Wests Tigers
Sean O'Sullivan	Penrith Panthers	Dolphins
Charlie Staines	Penrith Panthers	Wests Tigers
Josh Mansour	South Sydney Rabbitohs	Retirement
Mark Nicholls	South Sydney Rabbitohs	Dolphins
Kodi Nikorima	South Sydney Rabbitohs	Dolphins
Jaxson Paulo	South Sydney Rabbitohs	Sydney Roosters
George Burgess	St. George Illawarra Dragons	Retirement
Poasa Faamausili	St. George Illawarra Dragons	Dolphins
Jackson Ford	St. George Illawarra Dragons	New Zealand Warriors
Jack Gosiewski	St. George Illawarra Dragons	North Queensland Cowboys
Andrew McCullough	St. George Illawarra Dragons	Retirement
Josh McGuire	St. George Illawarra Dragons	Warrington Wolves (Super League)
Tariq Sims	St. George Illawarra Dragons	Melbourne Storm
Adam Keighran	Sydney Roosters	Catalans Dragons (Super League)
Kevin Naiqama	Sydney Roosters	Huddersfield Giants (Super League)
Sio Siua Taukeiaho	Sydney Roosters	Catalans Dragons (Super League)
Sam Verrills	Sydney Roosters	Gold Coast Titans
Fa'amanu Brown	Wests Tigers	Canterbury-Bankstown Bulldogs
Luke Garner	Wests Tigers	Penrith Panthers
Oliver Gildart	Wests Tigers	Leigh Leopards (Super League)
Jackson Hastings	Wests Tigers	Newcastle Knights
Jacob Liddle	Wests Tigers	St. George Illawarra Dragons
Zane Musgrove	Wests Tigers	St. George Illawarra Dragons
Tyrone Peachey	Wests Tigers	Penrith Panthers
James Roberts	Wests Tigers	Retirement
James Tamou	Wests Tigers	North Queensland Cowboys
Kelma Tuilagi	Wests Tigers	Manly Warringah Sea Eagles
Joe Chan	Catalans Dragons (Super League)	Melbourne Storm
Dylan Napa	Catalans Dragons (Super League)	Sydney Roosters
Jack Cogger	Huddersfield Giants (Super League)	Penrith Panthers
Danny Levi	Huddersfield Giants (Super League)	Canberra Raiders
Josh Reynolds	Hull F.C.(Super League)	Canterbury-Bankstown Bulldogs
Will Smith	Hull F.C. (Super League)	Wests Tigers
John Bateman	Wigan Warriors (Super League)	Wests Tigers
Jeral Skelton	Melbourne Rebels (Super Rugby)	Canterbury-Bankstown Bulldogs
Brayden Wiliame	USA Perpignan (Top 14)	New Zealand Warriors
Gehamat Shibasaki	Green Rockets Tokatsu (Japan Rugby League One)	North Queensland Cowboys

=== Mid-season transfers ===
Player	Original club	→ New club	Date of transfer
Ken Maumalo	Wests Tigers	Burleigh Bears (Hostplus Cup)	23 March
Aaron Woods	St. George Illawarra Dragons	Manly Warringah Sea Eagles	27 March
Thomas Mikaele	Warrington Wolves (Super League)	Gold Coast Titans	31 March
Kruise Leeming	Leeds Rhinos (Super League)	Gold Coast Titans	2 April
Matt Ikuvalu	Cronulla-Sutherland Sharks	Catalans Dragons (Super League)	27 April
Andrew Davey	Canterbury-Bankstown Bulldogs	Parramatta Eels	28 April
Sam McIntyre	Gold Coast Titans	North Queensland Cowboys	15 May
Joe Ofahengaue	Wests Tigers	Parramatta Eels	23 May
Josh Kerr	St. George Illawarra Dragons	Dolphins	17 June
Matthew Lodge	Sydney Roosters	Manly Warringah Sea Eagles	11 July
Moses Mbye	St. George Illawarra Dragons	St Helens (Super League)	23 July
Liam Knight	South Sydney Rabbitohs	Canterbury-Bankstown Bulldogs	24 July
Joey Lussick	St Helens (Super League)	Parramatta Eels	25 July
Fa'amanu Brown	Canterbury-Bankstown Bulldogs	Newcastle Knights	28 July
Thomas Mikaele	Gold Coast Titans	Warrington Wolves (Super League)	2 August

=== Coaches ===
Coach	2022 Club	2023 Club
Des Hasler	Manly Warringah Sea Eagles	N/A
Cameron Ciraldo	Penrith Panthers (assistant)	Canterbury-Bankstown Bulldogs
Andrew Webster	Penrith Panthers (assistant)	New Zealand Warriors
Anthony Seibold	N/A	Manly Warringah Sea Eagles
Tim Sheens	N/A	Wests Tigers
