= 2025 Canberra Raiders season =

44th season of Canberra Raiders

- NRL Rank: 1st (Minor Premiers)
- Play-off result: Semi-finals
- 2025 record: Wins: 19; losses: 5
- Points scored: For: 654; against: 506

Team information
- CEO: Don Furner Jr.
- Coach: (Australia) Ricky Stuart
- Captain: (New Zealand) Joseph Tapine
- Stadium: GIO Stadium
- Avg. attendance: 19,139
← 2024	List of seasons	2026 →

The 2025 Canberra Raiders season was the 44th season in the club's history and in the National Rugby League. Coached by head coach Ricky Stuart and captained by Joseph Tapine, the team competed in the 2025 NRL Telstra Premiership during the regular season and participated in the Pre-season Challenge in February.

On 30 August 2025, after defeating the Wests Tigers 24–10 at home, the Raiders won the Minor Premiership for the first time in 35 years, which was also their second Minor Premiership in club history.

== Squad information ==
Canberra Raiders 2025 squad
Top 30 squad - 2025 NRL season			Supplementary list	Coaching staff
Michael Asomua – WG; Jamal Fogarty (vc) – HB; Albert Hopoate – CE, WG; Corey Horsburgh – PR, LK; Zac Hosking – SR, LK; Sebastian Kris – CE; Danny Levi – HK; Ata Mariota – PR, SR; Jordan Martin – PR; Myles Martin – LK	Trey Mooney – LK, PR; Matty Nicholson – SR; Josh Papali'i – PR; Owen Pattie – HK; Vena Patuki-Case – PR; Ethan Sanders – HB; Simi Sasagi – SR, CE; Pasami Saulo – PR; Xavier Savage – WG; Morgan Smithies – LK	Tom Starling – HK; Chevy Stewart – FB; Ethan Strange – FE; Savelio Tamale – WG; Joseph Tapine (c) – PR; Matthew Timoko – CE; Kaeo Weekes – FB; Hudson Young – SR	Jake Clydsdale – PR; Noah Martin – SR; Joe Roddy – SR; Jed Stuart – WG; Manaia Waitere – CE, FE, FB; Train and trial: Adam Cook – HB, CE, FE; Shaun Packer – HK	Head coach: Ricky Stuart; Assistant coaches: Mick Crawley; Justin Giteau; Chris Lewis (NSW Cup Coach); Ash Barnes (Jersey Flegg Coach); Chris Hitchison (Elite Pathways Coach); Josh Miller (Contact Coach); Jarrod Croker (Outside Backs & Goal Kicking Coach); Legend: (c) Captain(s); (vc) Vice-captain(s); Updated: 20 September 2025; Source(s): Raiders 2025 Squad Tracker

== Squad changes ==
=== Transfers in ===
Date	Pos.	Player	From	Window	Ref.

=== Transfers out ===
Date	Pos.	Player	To	Window	Ref.

== Pre-season ==
Canberra Raiders played the Penrith Panthers in Cronulla and the Cronulla-Sutherland Sharks in Canberra as their pre-season fixtures. Both matches were part of the third edition of the NRL Pre-season Challenge.

Win Draw Loss Fixtures

Round 1: 8 February 2025	Penrith Panthers	16–22	Canberra Raiders	Cronulla
19:30 AEDT	Tries: Fale 35'; Lane 69'; Lamont 71'; Goals: Cole 0/1; Toelau 2/2 70', 73'	Report	Tries: Sasagi 26'; Pattie 45', 48'; N. Martin 64'; Goals: Sanders 1/2 27'; Cook 1/1 46'; Skipps 1/1 66'	Stadium: Sharks Stadium; Attendance: 1,724; Referee: Belinda Sharpe

Round 2: 13 February 2025	Canberra Raiders	10–40	Cronulla-Sutherland Sharks	Canberra
19:50 AEDT	Tries: Strange 8'; Kris 12'; Goals: Fogarty 1/2 9'	Report	Tries: Hynes 24'; Stonestreet 36'; Fonua-Blake 45'; Trindall 47'; Ramien 50'; Hau Tapuha 67'; Vea'ila 76'; Goals: Hynes 1/1 25'; Trindall 4/4 37', 46', 49', 51'; Atkinson 1/2 68'	Stadium: GIO Stadium; Attendance: 3,580; Referee: Liam Kennedy

== Regular season ==
=== Ladder ===
Pos	Team	Pld	W	D	L	B	PF	PA	PD	Pts	Qualification
1	Canberra Raiders	24	19	0	5	3	654	506	+148	44	Advance to finals series
2	Melbourne Storm	24	17	0	7	3	671	459	+212	40	Advance to finals series
3	Canterbury-Bankstown Bulldogs	24	16	0	8	3	534	414	+120	38	Advance to finals series
4	Brisbane Broncos (P)	24	15	0	9	3	680	508	+172	36	Advance to finals series
5	Cronulla-Sutherland Sharks	24	15	0	9	3	599	490	+109	36	Advance to finals series
6	New Zealand Warriors	24	14	0	10	3	517	496	+21	34	Advance to finals series
7	Penrith Panthers	24	13	1	10	3	576	469	+107	33	Advance to finals series
8	Sydney Roosters	24	13	0	11	3	653	521	+132	32	Advance to finals series
9	Dolphins	24	12	0	12	3	721	596	+125	30	
10	Manly Warringah Sea Eagles	24	12	0	12	3	555	534	+21	30	
11	Parramatta Eels	24	10	0	14	3	502	578	−76	26	
12	North Queensland Cowboys	24	9	1	14	3	538	684	−146	25	
13	Wests Tigers	24	9	0	15	3	477	612	−135	24	
14	South Sydney Rabbitohs	24	9	0	15	3	427	608	−181	24	
15	St. George Illawarra Dragons	24	8	0	16	3	498	628	−130	22	
16	Gold Coast Titans	24	6	0	18	3	520	719	−199	18	
17	Newcastle Knights	24	6	0	18	3	338	638	−300	18	

Source: National Rugby League
(P) Premiers

=== Results by round ===
Round	1	2	3	4	5	6	7	8	9	10	11	12	13	14	15	16	17	18	19	20	21	22	23	24	25	26	27
Ground	H	H	A	A	H	A	A	H	A	H	H	A	A	H	–	A	A	H	–	H	H	A	H	–	A	H	A
Result	W	W	L	L	W	W	W	W	W	L	W	W	W	W	B	W	W	W	B	W	W	L	W	B	W	W	L
Position	4	2	9	12	7	4	3	3	2	4	3	2	2	2	2	2	1	1	1	1	1	1	1	1	1	1	1
Points	2	4	4	4	6	8	10	12	14	14	16	18	20	22	24	26	28	30	32	34	36	36	38	40	42	44	44

Source: National Rugby League
A = Away; H = Home; N = Neutral; B = Bye; W = Win; D = Draw; L = Loss

=== Matches ===
The league fixtures were released on 21 November 2024.

Win Draw Loss Bye Fixtures

Round 1: 1 March 2025	Canberra Raiders	30–8	New Zealand Warriors	Las Vegas, United States
16:00 PST	Tries: Kris 5', 44'; Savage 26', 31'; Timoko 55'; Goals: Fogarty 5/6 6', 32', 45', 56', pen 75'; Sin bin: Tapine (yellow card) 64' to 74'	Report	Tries: Capewell 36'; Tuivasa-Sheck 71'; Goals: Metcalf 0/2	Stadium: Allegiant Stadium; Attendance: 45,209; Referee: Grant Atkins

Round 2: 15 March 2025	Canberra Raiders	32–22	Brisbane Broncos	Canberra
19:35 AEDT	Tries: Nicholson 7', 37'; Papali'i 16'; Starling 46'; Timoko 50'; Tamale 58'; Goals: Fogarty 4/6 9', 18', 52', 59'	Report	Tries: Arthars 25', 33', 77'; Cobbo 64'; Goals: Reynolds 3/4 26', 64', 77'	Stadium: GIO Stadium; Attendance: 18,884; Referee: Wyatt Raymond

Round 3: 23 March 2025	Manly Warringah Sea Eagles	40–12	Canberra Raiders	Brookvale
18:15 AEDT	Tries: Garrick 22', 37', 48', 51'; Bullemor 27', 29'; Simpkin 32'; Goals: Garrick 6/7 24', 28', 30', 33', 39', 53'	Report	Tries: Kris 63'; Young 77'; Goals: Fogarty 2/2 64', 78'; Sin bin: Horsburgh (yellow card) 21' to 31'	Stadium: 4 Pines Park; Attendance: 16,125; Referee: Grant Atkins

Round 4: 29 March 2025	North Queensland Cowboys	30–20	Canberra Raiders	Townsville
16:30 AEST	Tries: Taulagi 25'; Clifford 30', 33'; Derby 47'; Dearden 75'; Goals: Drinkwater 5/6 32', 34', 48', pen 71', 76'; Sin bin: Hess (yellow card) 56' to 66'	Report	Tries: Tapine 10'; Savage 51'; Tamale 63'; Goals: Fogarty 4/5 12', pen 21', 64', pen 79'	Stadium: Queensland Country Bank Stadium; Attendance: 15,897; Referee: Adam Gee

Round 5: 3 April 2025	Canberra Raiders	24–20	Cronulla-Sutherland Sharks	Canberra
20:00 AEDT	Tries: Nicholson 4'; Young 22', 31'; Kris 78'; Goals: Fogarty 4/4 6', 24', 33', 79'; Sin bin: Young (yellow card) 57' to 67'	Report	Tries: Hiroti 8'; Nikora 25', 38'; Goals: Hynes 4/4 10', 27', 40', pen 58'	Stadium: GIO Stadium; Attendance: 10,914; Referee: Todd Smith

Round 6: 12 April 2025	Parramatta Eels	12–50	Canberra Raiders	Darwin
19:05 ACST	Tries: Brown 13'; Addo-Carr 49'; Goals: Russell 2/2 14', 51'	Report	Tries: Tapine 6'; Strange 19'; Young 23', 57'; Timoko 38'; Savage 64'; Nicholson 74'; Kris 77'; Goals: Fogarty 7/7 7', 20', 24', 39', pen 54', 58', 66'; Weekes 2/2 76', 77'	Stadium: TIO Stadium; Attendance: 9,559; Referee: Wyatt Raymond

Round 7: 20 April 2025	Gold Coast Titans	20–30	Canberra Raiders	Gold Coast
14:00 AEST	Tries: Fermor 3'; S. Fifita 9'; Brimson 19'; Fitzgibbon 51'; Goals: Weaver 2/4 5', 20'	Report	Tries: Tamale 26'; Young 33', 64'; Strange 39'; Kris 42'; Goals: Fogarty 5/6 34', 40', 43', 66', pen 68'	Stadium: Cbus Super Stadium; Attendance: 15,089; Referee: Adam Gee

Round 8: 27 April 2025	Canberra Raiders	40–28	Dolphins	Canberra
14:00 AEST	Tries: Tamale 9'; Weekes 30'; Hosking 49'; Strange 60'; Nicholson 65'; Kris 71'; Fogarty 78'; Goals: Fogarty 6/8 32', 51', 62', 66', 79', pen 80'	Report	Tries: Tabuai-Fidow 13'; Farnworth 19'; Saifiti 26'; Isaako 34'; Averillo 39'; Goals: Isaako 4/5 15', 21', 28', 36'; Sin bin: Nikorima (yellow card) 7' to 17'	Stadium: GIO Stadium; Attendance: 15,686; Referee: Ashley Klein

Round 9: 4 May 2025	Melbourne Storm	18–20 (g.p.)	Canberra Raiders	Brisbane
18:25 AEST	Tries: Anderson 6'; Papenhuyzen 15'; Fa'alogo 58'; Goals: Papenhuyzen 3/5 pen 10', 16', pen 24'; Sin bin: Utoikamanu (yellow card) 83' to 85'	Report	Tries: Tamale 28'; Timoko 33'; Weekes 77'; Goals: Fogarty 4/4 29', 34', 79', pen 84'; Sin bin: Papali'i (yellow card) 83' to 85'	Stadium: Suncorp Stadium; Attendance: 49,057; Referee: Gerard Sutton

Round 10: 10 May 2025	Canberra Raiders	20–32	Canterbury-Bankstown Bulldogs	Canberra
15:00 AEST	Tries: Hosking 3'; Weekes 17'; Savage 22'; Young 37'; Goals: Fogarty 2/4 4', 23'	Report	Tries: Crichton 44'; Salmon 46'; Montoya 50'; King 57'; Kikau 63'; Kiraz 71'; Goals: Crichton 4/6 45', 48', 58', 73'	Stadium: GIO Stadium; Attendance: 23,867; Referee: Adam Gee

== Player statistics ==
As of 2025 season end

Players with no appearances are not included on the list.

Player	Apps	T	C	FG	Total
(Australia) Jamal Fogarty	24	2	92/114	0	196
(Australia) Albert Hopoate	1	0	0	0	0
(Australia) Corey Horsburgh	25	2	0	0	8
(Australia) Zac Hosking	21	5	0	0	20
(New Zealand) Sebastian Kris	24	9	0	0	36
(Samoa) Ata Mariota	26	0	0	0	0
(England) Matty Nicholson	11	5	0	0	20
(Samoa) Josh Papali'i	24	3	1/1	0	14
(Australia) Owen Pattie	26	2	0	0	8
(New Zealand) Simi Sasagi	22	7	0	0	28
(Australia) Xavier Savage	21	12	0	0	48
(England) Morgan Smithies	25	1	0	0	4
(Australia) Tom Starling	24	4	0	0	16
(Australia) Ethan Strange	24	14	4/4	0	66
(Australia) Savelio Tamale	18	7	0	0	28
(New Zealand) Joseph Tapine	23	5	0	0	20
(New Zealand) Matthew Timoko	25	10	0	0	40
(Australia) Kaeo Weekes	25	11	2/3	0	48
(Australia) Hudson Young	22	11	0	0	44
(Australia) Jed Stuart	11	5	0	0	20
(Australia) Noah Martin	6	2	0	0	8
(Australia) Joe Roddy	1	2	0	0	8
(Australia) Adam Cook	1	0	4/4	0	8
(Australia) Ethan Sanders	2	0	3/4	0	6
(Australia) Morgan Smithies	25	1	0	0	4
(Australia) Michael Asomua	1	1	0	0	4
(Australia) Trey Mooney	4	1	0	0	0
(New Zealand) Danny Levi	2	1	0	0	0
(Australia) Kain Anderson	1	1	0	0	0
(New Zealand) Manaia Waitere	1	1	0	0	0
(Australia) Chevy Stewart	1	1	0	0	0
