= 2024 Canberra Raiders season =

Australian rugby league club season

- NRL Rank: 9th
- Play-off result: DNQ
- 2024 record: Wins: 12; losses: 12
- Points scored: For: 474; against: 601

Team information
- CEO: Don Furner Jr
- Coach: (Australia) Ricky Stuart
- Captain: (England) Elliott Whitehead
- Stadium: GIO Stadium (Capacity: 25,000)
← 2023	List of seasons	2025 →

The 2024 Canberra Raiders season was the 43rd season in the club's history, and they compete in the National Rugby League. Elliott Whitehead retains team captaincy for his sixth consecutive season, while Ricky Stuart continued as head coach for his eleventh consecutive season.

== Squad information ==
Canberra Raiders 2024 squad
Top 30 squad - 2024 NRL season			Supplementary list	Coaching staff
Nick Cotric – WG, CE; Jamal Fogarty (vc) – HB; Emre Guler – PR; Corey Harawira-Naera – LK, SR; Peter Hola – PR, LK; Albert Hopoate – CE, FB, WG; Corey Horsburgh – PR; Zac Hosking – SR; Sebastian Kris – CE; Danny Levi – HK	Ata Mariota – SR, LK; Trey Mooney – PR; Josh Papali'i – PR; Hohepa Puru – LK, SR, HK; Jordan Rapana – FB, WG; Simi Sasagi – SR, CE; Pasami Saulo – PR; Xavier Savage – WG; James Schiller – WG, CE, FB; Morgan Smithies – LK	Tom Starling – HK; Chevy Stewart – FB; Ethan Strange – FE; Joseph Tapine – PR; Matthew Timoko – CE; Kaeo Weekes – HB, FB; Elliott Whitehead (c) – SR; Zac Woolford – HK; Hudson Young – SR	Michael Asomua – WG; Jordan Martin – SR; Noah Martin – SR; Vena Patuki-Case – PR; Adrian Trevilyan – HK; Extended squad: Adam Cook – HB, CE, FE	Head coach: Ricky Stuart; Assistant coaches: Mick Crawley; Justin Giteau; Michael Maguire (Senior NRL Consultant); Brock Shepperd (NSW Cup Coach); Ash Barnes (Jersey Flegg Coach); Chris Hitchison (Elite Pathways Coach); Josh Miller (Contact Coach); Jarrod Croker (Outside Backs & Goal Kicking Coach); Medical professionals: Greg MacLeod (Club Doctor); Travis Ronaldson (NRL Strength & Power Coach/Club Dietitian); Leigh Woodbridge (NRL Rehabilitation Coach); Tom Christian (NRL Sports Scientist); Konrad Schultz (Head Physiotherapist); Isaac Priddis (Physiotherapist); Managers: Josh Strahorn (NRL High Performance Manager); Joel Carbone (NRL Recruitment Manager); Dean Souter (Pathways & Performance); Dave Warwick (Elite Recruitment); Legend: (c) Captain(s); (vc) Vice-captain(s); Updated: 7 September 2024; Source(s): Raiders 2024 Squad Tracker

== Pre-season ==
Canberra played the Parramatta Eels in Kogarah and the North Queensland Cowboys in Queanbeyan as their pre-season fixtures. Both matches were part of the second edition of the NRL Pre-season Challenge.

Round 1: 17 February 2024	Parramatta Eels	16–38	Canberra Raiders	Kogarah
17:55 AEDT	Tries: Ogden 7'; Russell 11'; Simonsson 44'; Goals: Russell 2/3 8', 44'	[Report; Details Report]	Tries: Weekes 17'; Taateo 27'; Stuart 51'; Schiller 56'; Hola 60'; Cook 67'; Martin 72'; Goals: Strange 4/5 29', 53', 57', 60'; Cook 1/2 68'; Sin bin: Martin (yellow card) 41' to 51'	Stadium: Netstrata Jubilee Stadium; Attendance: 8,827; Referee: Chris Butler

Round 2: 25 February 2024	Canberra Raiders	26–36	North Queensland Cowboys	Queanbeyan
15:00 AEDT	Tries: Strange 10'; Savage 13'; Timoko 22'; Cotric 56'; Hola 70'; Goals: Strange 1/3 23'; Stewart 1/1 58'; Henderson 1/1 71'; Sin bin: Strange (yellow card) 53' to 63'	[Report; Details Report]	Tries: Feldt 19', 51', 59'; Laybutt 32'; Taulagi 45'; Mikaele 47', 78'; Goals: Holmes 2/4 46', 49'; Drinkwater 1/2 52'; Laybutt 1/1 79'	Stadium: Seiffert Oval; Attendance: 6,048; Referee: Chris Butler

== Regular season ==
=== League table ===
Pos	Team	Pld	W	D	L	B	PF	PA	PD	Pts	Qualification
1	Melbourne Storm	24	19	0	5	3	692	449	+243	44	Advance to finals series
2	Penrith Panthers (P)	24	17	0	7	3	580	394	+186	40	Advance to finals series
3	Sydney Roosters	24	16	0	8	3	738	463	+275	38	Advance to finals series
4	Cronulla-Sutherland Sharks	24	16	0	8	3	653	431	+222	38	Advance to finals series
5	North Queensland Cowboys	24	15	0	9	3	657	568	+89	36	Advance to finals series
6	Canterbury-Bankstown Bulldogs	24	14	0	10	3	529	433	+96	34	Advance to finals series
7	Manly Warringah Sea Eagles	24	13	1	10	3	634	521	+113	33	Advance to finals series
8	Newcastle Knights	24	12	0	12	3	470	510	−40	30	Advance to finals series
9	Canberra Raiders	24	12	0	12	3	474	601	−127	30	
10	Dolphins	24	11	0	13	3	577	578	−1	28	
11	St. George Illawarra Dragons	24	11	0	13	3	508	634	−126	28	
12	Brisbane Broncos	24	10	0	14	3	537	607	−70	26	
13	New Zealand Warriors	24	9	1	14	3	512	574	−62	25	
14	Gold Coast Titans	24	8	0	16	3	488	656	−168	22	
15	Parramatta Eels	24	7	0	17	3	561	716	−155	20	
16	South Sydney Rabbitohs	24	7	0	17	3	494	682	−188	20	
17	Wests Tigers	24	6	0	18	3	463	750	−287	18	

Source: National Rugby League
(P) Premiers

=== Results by round ===
Round	1	2	3	4	5	6	7	8	9	10	11	12	13	14	15	16	17	18	19	20	21	22	23	24	25	26	27
Ground	A	H	A	A	H	H	A	H	A	–	N	H	A	–	H	A	A	H	–	H	H	A	H	A	H	A	A
Result	W	W	L	L	W	W	L	L	W	B	W	L	W	B	L	L	L	L	B	W	W	L	L	L	W	W	W
Position	4	1	3	8	5	3	7	10	9	7	6	8	6	5	7	10	12	12	11	10	9	10	11	12	12	11	9
Points	2	4	4	4	6	8	8	8	10	12	14	14	16	18	18	18	18	18	20	22	24	24	24	24	26	28	30

Source: National Rugby League
A = Away; H = Home; N = Neutral; B = Bye; W = Win; D = Draw; L = Loss

=== Matches ===
The league fixtures were announced on 13 November 2023.

Win Draw Loss Fixtures

Round 1: 7 March 2024	Newcastle Knights	12–28	Canberra Raiders	Newcastle
20:00 AEDT	Tries: Frizell 30'; Hastings 76'; Goals: Ponga 2/2 32', 76'	[Report Report]	Tries: Hosking 25'; Levi 47'; Savage 63'; Rapana 69'; Young 79'; Goals: Fogarty 4/6 15 pen', 26', 48', 79'; Sin bin: Young (yellow card) 24' to 34'	Stadium: McDonald Jones Stadium; Attendance: 22,378; Referee: Todd Smith

Round 2: 16 March 2024	Canberra Raiders	32–12	Wests Tigers	Canberra
15:00 AEDT	Tries: Levi 7'; Strange 11'; Rapana 30'; Savage 37'; Hosking 60'; Goals: Fogarty 6/7 6 pen', 8', 13', 32', 57 pen', 61'	[Report Report]	Tries: Fainu 24'; Koroisau 27'; Goals: Koroisau 2/2 25', 28'; Sin bin: Utoikamanu (yellow card) 77' to 80'	Stadium: GIO Stadium; Attendance: 16,968; Referee: Peter Gough

Round 3: 22 March 2024	New Zealand Warriors	18–10	Canberra Raiders	Christchurch
20:00 NZDT	Tries: Fonua-Blake 8'; Metcalf 61'; Tuivasa-Sheck 64'; Goals: Metcalf 3/3 10', 63', 66'	[Report Report]	Tries: Timoko 31'; Cotric 51'; Goals: Fogarty 1/2 55'	Stadium: Apollo Projects Stadium; Attendance: 17,249; Referee: Liam Kennedy

Round 4: 31 March 2024	Cronulla-Sutherland Sharks	36–22	Canberra Raiders	Cronulla
20:15 AEST	Tries: Trindall 27'; Mulitalo 33', 62'; Brailey 36'; Iro 58'; Katoa 79'; Goals: Hynes 6/6 29', 35', 37', 60', 63', 79'	[Report Report]	Tries: Schiller 11', 71'; Savage 17'; Levi 23'; Goals: Fogarty 3/4 13', 18', 24'	Stadium: PointsBet Stadium; Attendance: 12,692; Referee: Todd Smith

Round 5: 7 April 2024	Canberra Raiders	41–8	Parramatta Eels	Canberra
18:15 AEST	Tries: Kris 13'; Savage 28'; Timoko 42', 78'; Levi 52'; Schiller 57'; Young 60'; Goals: Fogarty 6/9 9 pen', 15', 53', 61', 68 pen', 79'; Field goals: Fogarty 39'	[Report; Details Report]	Tries: Sivo 47', 71'; Goals: Gutherson 0/2	Stadium: GIO Stadium; Attendance: 13,907; Referee: Adam Gee

Round 6: 14 April 2024	Canberra Raiders	21–20 (g.p.)	Gold Coast Titans	Canberra
18:15 AEST	Tries: Schiller 17', 68'; Young 25'; Goals: Fogarty 4/4 19', 27', 48 pen', 70'; Field goals: Fogarty 89'	[Report; Details Report]	Tries: Jolliffe 38'; Smith-Shields 43'; Khan-Pereira 75', 79'; Goals: Campbell 1/2 39'; Kelly 1/2 79'	Stadium: GIO Stadium; Attendance: 11,738; Referee: Kasey Badger

Round 7: 20 April 2024	Brisbane Broncos	34–10	Canberra Raiders	Brisbane
19:35 AEST	Tries: Walsh 12', 31'; Riki 17'; Mam 19'; Walters 27'; Cobbo 55'; Goals: Walsh 5/6 14', 18', 21', 28', 56'	[Report Report]	Tries: Sasagi 49'; Savage 66'; Goals: Stewart 1/2 51'	Stadium: Suncorp Stadium; Attendance: 37,286; Referee: Chris Butler

Round 8: 28 April 2024	Canberra Raiders	0–40	Cronulla-Sutherland Sharks	Canberra
16:05 AEST		[Report Report]	Tries: McInnes 12'; Hazelton 17'; Katoa 25', 61'; Nikora 45'; Hynes 54'; Ramien 74'; Goals: Hynes 6/7 14', 18', 26', 46', 55', 63'	Stadium: GIO Stadium; Attendance: 15,820; Referee: Peter Gough

Round 9: 3 May 2024	Manly Warringah Sea Eagles	24–26	Canberra Raiders	Brookvale
18:00 AEST	Tries: T. Trbojevic 8'; Talau 16'; Cherry-Evans 21'; Garrick 26', 49'; Goals: Garrick 2/5 10', 28'	[Report Report]	Tries: Weekes 25'; Whitehead 52', 57'; Cotric 66'; Young 76'; Goals: Weekes 3/5 32', 54', 59'; Sin bin: Hopoate (yellow card) 24' to 34'	Stadium: 4 Pines Park; Attendance: 10,215; Referee: Grant Atkins

Round 10 (Bye for Canberra Raiders)

Round 11: 17 May 2024	Canberra Raiders	24–20	Canterbury-Bankstown Bulldogs	Brisbane
18:00 AEST	Tries: Savage 2'; Kris 19'; Young 51', 60'; Goals: Rapana 4/4 4', 20', 52', 62'; Sin bin: Rapana (yellow card) 35' to 45'; Papali'i (yellow card) 39' to 49'	[Report Report]	Tries: Preston 30'; Crichton 36'; Burton 39'; Kiraz 41'; Goals: Burton 2/4 32', 42'	Stadium: Suncorp Stadium; Attendance: 50,971; Referee: Ashley Klein

Round 12: 25 May 2024	Canberra Raiders	16–44	Sydney Roosters	Canberra
16:05 AEST	Tries: Cotric 15'; Young 48'; Weekes 72'; Goals: Rapana 2/3 16', 73'	[Report Report]	Tries: Radley 3'; Keary 10'; Manu 35', 53'; Tedesco 40', 78'; Sua'ali'i 58'; Crichton 67'; Goals: Walker 3/3 4', 12', 79'; Sua'ali'i 3/5 36', 42', 55'	Stadium: GIO Stadium; Attendance: 18,049; Referee: Todd Smith

Round 13: 1 June 2024	Dolphins	25–26 (g.p.)	Canberra Raiders	Redcliffe
19:35 AEST	Tries: Marshall-King 8'; Bostock 23'; Averillo 43'; Donoghoe 67'; Goals: Isaako 4/4 10', 25', 44', 68'; Field goals: Isaako 71'	[Report Report]	Tries: Savage 12'; Mariota 16'; Whitehead 31'; Weekes 56'; Goals: Rapana 4/4 13', 17', 32', 57'; Field goals: Rapana 77', 87'	Stadium: Kayo Stadium; Attendance: 10,024; Referee: Adam Gee

Round 14 (Bye for Canberra Raiders)

Round 15: 14 June 2024	Canberra Raiders	16–34	North Queensland Cowboys	Canberra
18:00 AEST	Tries: Rapana 52'; Savage 66'; Whitehead 69'; Goals: Rapana 2/3 54', 70'	[Report Report]	Tries: Feldt 8', 28'; Luki 13'; Nanai 17'; Holmes 50'; Robson 64'; Goals: Holmes 5/6 9', 14', 19', 51', 66'	Stadium: GIO Stadium; Attendance: 9,671; Referee: Chris Sutton

Round 16: 23 June 2024	Wests Tigers	48–24	Canberra Raiders	Campbelltown
16:05 AEST	Tries: Galvin 3', 40'; L. Laulilii 10'; Si. Fainu 34'; Bula 43'; Utoikamanu 52'; Koroisau 57'; Doueihi 73'; Goals: Koroisau 8/8 4', 12', 35', 42', 44', 54', 59', 74'; Sin bin: Seyfarth (yellow card) 62' to 72'	[Report Report]	Tries: Levi 47'; Cotric 62'; Weekes 64'; Strange 68'; Goals: Rapana 4/5 39 pen', 48', 65', 68'	Stadium: Campbelltown Sports Stadium; Attendance: 10,106; Referee: Todd Smith

Round 17: 29 June 2024	Melbourne Storm	16–6	Canberra Raiders	Melbourne
19:35 AEST	Tries: King 36'; Blore 45'; Howarth 51'; Goals: Wishart 2/4 38', 47'	[Report Report]	Tries: Weekes 41'; Goals: Rapana 1/1 42'	Stadium: AAMI Park; Attendance: 14,127; Referee: Grant Atkins

Round 18: 7 July 2024	Canberra Raiders	12–16	Newcastle Knights	Canberra
16:05 AEST	Tries: Papali'i 6'; Weekes 53'; Goals: Rapana 2/3 7', 55'	[Report Report]	Tries: Gagai 9', 43'; Marzhew 17'; Goals: Hastings 1/2 11'; Pryce 1/1 44'	Stadium: GIO Stadium; Attendance: 12,553; Referee: Gerard Sutton

Round 19 (Bye for Canberra Raiders)

Round 20: 19 July 2024	Canberra Raiders	20–18	New Zealand Warriors	Canberra
20:00 AEST	Tries: Young 5', 10'; Savage 70'; Goals: Fogarty 4/4 6', 11', 18 pen', 71'	[Report Report]	Tries: Tuivasa-Sheck 37'; Capewell 46'; Barnett 59'; Fonua-Blake 72'; Goals: Pompey 1/1 38'; Harris-Tavita 0/3	Stadium: GIO Stadium; Attendance: 8,509; Referee: Todd Smith

Round 21: 28 July 2024	Canberra Raiders	32–12	South Sydney Rabbitohs	Canberra
18:15 AEST	Tries: Rapana 4', 36'; Savage 9'; Kris 19'; Mariota 44'; Goals: Fogarty 6/6 6', 10', 21', 37', 45', 70 pen' Sin bin: Whitehead (yellow card) 79' to 80'	[Report Report]	Tries: Milne 30'; Walker 39'; Duncan 60'; Goals: Cook 0/3	Stadium: GIO Stadium; Attendance: 12,114; Referee: Wyatt Raymond

Round 22: 4 August 2024	Canterbury-Bankstown Bulldogs	22–18	Canberra Raiders	Belmore
16:05 AEST	Tries: Crichton 16', 45'; Addo-Carr 52', 68'; Goals: Burton 3/5 26 pen', 53', 69'	[Report Report]	Tries: Mooney 21'; Timoko 58'; Rapana 72'; Goals: Fogarty 3/3 22', 60', 73'	Stadium: Belmore Sports Ground; Attendance: 18,110; Referee: Ashley Klein

Round 23: 10 August 2024	Canberra Raiders	24–46	Manly Warringah Sea Eagles	Canberra
15:00 AEST	Tries: Papali'i 9'; Weekes 19'; Kris 70'; Savage 72'; Goals: Fogarty 4/5 10', 20', 71', 73'; Sin bin: Tapine (yellow card) 53' to 63'	[Report Report]	Tries: T. Trbojevic 11', 59'; Talau 25'; Bullemor 39'; Cherry-Evans 43'; Hopoate 49'; Paseka 57'; Brooks 61'; Goals: Garrick 7/8 13', 26', 39', 44', 58', 60', 62'	Stadium: GIO Stadium; Attendance: 16,690; Referee: Grant Atkins

Round 24: 17 August 2024	North Queensland Cowboys	42–4	Canberra Raiders	Townsville
17:30 AEST	Tries: Clifford 4'; Holmes 17', 43', 47'; Feldt 34', 58'; Dearden 38'; Goals: Holmes 7/7 5', 18', 35', 39', 44', 49', 59'	[Report Report]	Tries: Kris 29'; Goals: Fogarty 0/1	Stadium: Queensland Country Bank Stadium; Attendance: 17,920; Referee: Todd Smith

Round 25: 24 August 2024	Canberra Raiders	22–18	Penrith Panthers	Canberra
15:00 AEST	Tries: Savage 5', 70'; Weekes 22'; Hopoate 59'; Goals: Fogarty 3/4 23', 60', 72'	[Report Report]	Tries: Sommerton 9'; Laurie 25'; Fisher-Harris 45'; Goals: Edwards 3/4 10', 30 pen', 46'	Stadium: GIO Stadium; Referee: Grant Atkins

Round 26: 1 September 2024	Sydney Roosters	12–14	Canberra Raiders	Moore Park
16:05 AEST	Tries: Tupou 63', 79'; Goals: Keary 2/4 12 pen', 78 pen'	[Report Report]	Tries: Whitehead 16'; Sasagi 26'; Savage 54'; Goals: Cook 1/3 28'; Sin bin: Whitehead (yellow card) 37' to 47', 62' to 72'	Stadium: Allianz Stadium; Attendance: 22,866; Referee: Todd Smith

Round 27: 7 September 2024	St. George Illawarra Dragons	24–26	Canberra Raiders	Kogarah
15:00 AEST	Tries: Eisenhuth 0'; Liddle 8'; Su'a 11'; King-Togia 19'; Goals: Lomax 4/4 2', 10', 12', 20'	[Report Report]	Tries: Levi 14'; Savage 24'; Hopoate 47'; Young 61'; Horsburgh 77'; Goals: Weekes 3/5 16', 48', 78'	Stadium: Netstrata Jubilee Stadium; Attendance: 11,189; Referee: Wyatt Raymond

== Player statistics ==
As of 8 February 2024
