= Matthew Nicholson =

Matthew or Matt Nicholson may refer to:

- Matthew Nicholson (cricketer) (born 1974), Australian cricketer
- Matty Nicholson (born 2003), English rugby league forward
