= David Hosking (rugby league) =

Australian rugby league footballer

Personal information
- Full name: David Hosking
- Born: 13 April 1964 (age 61); Sydney, New South Wales, Australia

Playing information
- Position: Prop
Club
Years	Team	Pld	T	G	FG	P
1987–89	South Sydney	15	0	0	0	0
1990–93	Manly Sea Eagles	63	1	0	0	4
1993–94	Hull Kingston Rovers	16	1	0	0	4
	Total	94	2	0	0	8
- Source: As of 23 January 2023
- Relatives: Zac Hosking (son)

David Hosking (born 13 April 1964), nicknamed "The Mule", is an Australian former professional rugby league footballer who played in the 1980s and 1990s. He played for South Sydney and Manly-Warringah in the NSWRL competition. He also played for Hull Kingston Rovers in England. He is the father of Canberra Raiders player Zac Hosking.

== Playing career ==
Hosking was a Manly local junior from the Harbord United Devils club, and played lower grades at Manly. He made his first grade debut however for South Sydney in round 2 of the 1987 NSWRL season against St. George. In 1989, Hosking made five appearances for Souths as they claimed the Minor Premiership. Hosking departed Souths at the end of the season having made over 60 appearances for the club across all grades. In 1990, Hosking joined Manly where he played 63 games for the club over four years. Hosking featured in Manly's 1990 and 1991 finals campaigns. In 1993, Hosking signed for English club Hull Kingston Rovers where he played one season.
