= Ricky Stuart =

Australian rugby league player and coach

Ricky Stuart AM
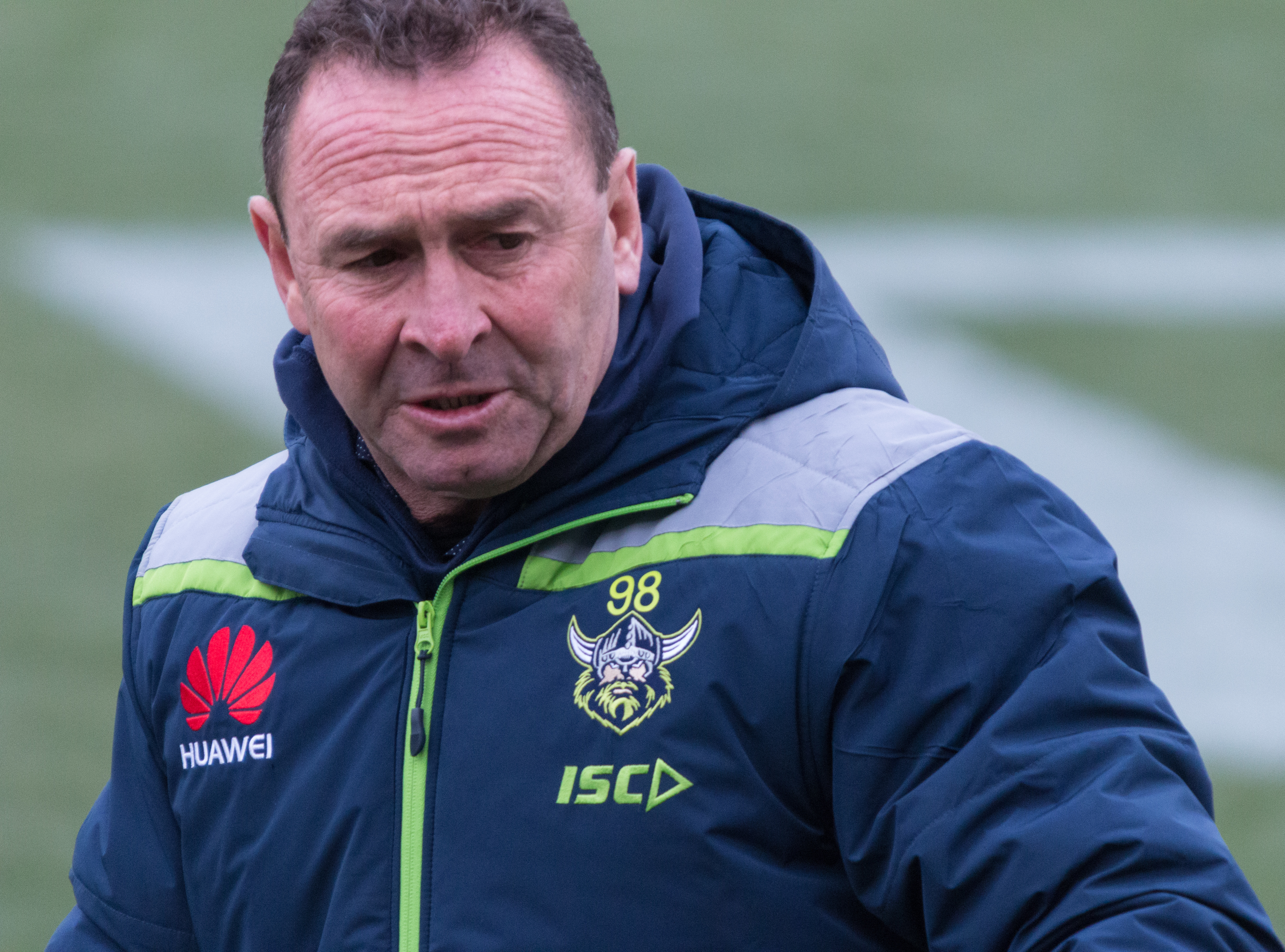

Personal information
- Full name: Ricky John Stuart
- Born: 7 January 1967 (age 59) Queanbeyan, New South Wales, Australia

Playing information
- Height: 175 cm (5 ft 9 in)
- Weight: 83 kg (13 st 1 lb)
- Position: Halfback
Club
Years	Team	Pld	T	G	FG	P
1988–98	Canberra Raiders	203	39	7	25	195
1999–00	Canterbury Bulldogs	40	2	0	2	10
	Total	243	41	7	27	205
Representative
Years	Team	Pld	T	G	FG	P
1990	NSW City	1	2	0	0	8
1990–94	New South Wales	14	3	0	0	12
1991	NSW Country	1	0	0	0	0
1990–94	Australia	9	1	0	1	5

Coaching information
Club
Years	Team	Gms	W	D	L	W%
2002–06	Sydney Roosters	130	78	1	51	60
2007–10	Cronulla Sharks	91	38	0	53	42
2013	Parramatta Eels	24	5	0	19	21
2014–	Canberra Raiders	320	168	1	151	53
	Total	565	289	2	274	51
Representative
Years	Team	Gms	W	D	L	W%
2004	NSW Country	1	1	0	0	100
2005	New South Wales	3	2	0	1	67
2006–08	Australia	14	12	0	2	86
2011–12	New South Wales	6	2	0	4	33
- Education: St Edmund's College, Canberra
- Relatives: Jed Stuart (son)

Ricky John "Sticky" Stuart AM (born 7 January 1967) is an Australian professional rugby league football coach who is the head coach of the Canberra Raiders in the NRL and a former rugby league footballer who played as a halfback in the 1980s, 1990s and 2000s.

He also replaced Craig Bellamy as head coach of the New South Wales State of Origin team following a fifth consecutive failure in the 2010 series. Stuart had previously been coach of the Australian national side, and has coached NRL clubs the Sydney Roosters (taking them to three consecutive grand finals from 2002 to 2004), Cronulla-Sutherland and Parramatta.

A former international representative rugby league and rugby union player – a dual-code international – Stuart also played State of Origin for New South Wales in the first Gould era. At club level, Stuart was the half-back of the "Green Machine", the Canberra Raiders team who were coached by Tim Sheens and won three premierships in 1989, 1990 and 1994, besides being runners-up in 1991. As a player Stuart was noted for his ability to throw long, spiralling passes to both the left and right sides of the field. As a coach Ricky has won one premiership.

== Early life and rugby union career ==
Ricky Stuart was born in Queanbeyan, New South Wales, Australia. He originally played rugby league as a child, but took up rugby union while attending St Edmund's College, Canberra.

Stuart was selected for the ACT Schoolboys in 1984, and attracted press attention the following season for a dominant display for his school in the Waratah Shield final. He would play for the Australian Schoolboys in 1985, when he was acclaimed as the best prospect in schoolboy rugby union since Michael O'Connor and David Campese.

Stuart's union career was with the Queanbeyan Whites before being selected for the 1987 Australia rugby union tour of Argentina. Stuart played for the Wallabies in three tour matches but no Test matches, in both the Fly-half and Scrum-half positions.

== Rugby league playing career ==
=== Canberra ===
Always interested in converting to rugby league, Stuart was initially chased by Balmain, who had a weakness in the halves at the time. He also received offers from reigning premiers Manly and the newly formed Newcastle club. However, his residence in Queanbeyan meant that he preferred playing with Canberra, and after initially signing to play for Manly RUFC, the Raiders would double Balmain's offer in order to get him.

With Chris O'Sullivan and Ivan Henjak holding down the Raiders' first grade inside back positions, Stuart began his senior league career in reserve grade. Although he would lift a previously weak Raider reserve grade team, Stuart would remain in reserve grade until the regular halves became injured at the end of June.

==== Establishing Himself as a Star ====
Once promoted to first grade, Stuart immediately stamped himself as a player of genuine class, and by the end of 1988 was earmarked for representative honours. He soon became a key factor behind the club's most successful period in the late 1980s and 1990s, playing halfback inside a backline including legendary talents Laurie Daley, Mal Meninga and Gary Belcher. After the 1989 Grand Final victory, Stuart and the Raiders travelled to England for the 1989 World Club Challenge which was lost to Widnes.

Although he had ambitions to play in representative rugby league as early as 1989, Stuart was never picked that season. However, he was already regarded as a strong candidate for the Kangaroo tour when the 1990 season opened. With New South Wales seeking new blood after two successive Origin cleansweep losses in 1988 and 1989, he was earmarked for a New South Wales halfback berth from very early in the season. Stuart would not disappoint: New South Wales won the series 2–1 and he was named man-of-the-match in the second game of the 1990 State of Origin series. He then won the Clive Churchill Medal in the Raiders' 1990 grand final victory over Penrith, and had become a certainty to tour with the Kangaroos.

Stuart debuted in the first test of the 1990 Kangaroo tour against Great Britain in London in October 1990, playing five-eighth outside Allan Langer. This appearance saw him become Australia's 38th dual code rugby international, following Michael O'Connor and preceding Scott Gourley. He replaced Langer at halfback in last two Tests, with Australia winning both.

==== Elite Halfback ====
Established in league's elite, Stuart would suffer throughout the 1991 season from a painful groin injury, despite having an operation after returning home from the Kangaroo Tour. He managed despite this handicap to play 24 of 26 club games for the Raiders, and all three Origin games for the Blues. However, Queensland won a very close series 2–1 and Stuart lost his Test jersey to Langer who was fitter and in better form at all levels. By the time of the finals, Stuart's kicking game was crippled by his groin trouble, and he was replaced by Scott Gale during the Raiders' grand final loss to Penrith.

During the 1991 season, the Raiders were plagued by massive debts and salary cap breaches, largely due to the cost of their move to Bruce Stadium and building a second leagues club. It was initially thought Stuart might sign with English club Wakefield Trinity. Although – unlike the Raiders’ other stars – Stuart received no recorded offer from any other English or NSWRL club during the peak of the club's financial crisis in the following three months, Stuart would not re-sign until after Meninga, Daley, Clyde and Walters had done so.

October surgery aimed to repair Stuart's chronic groin problems, but in 1992, Stuart would suffer a posterior cruciate ligament tear that required another surgery, and consequently missed his first domestic representative games since debuting at that level. He recovered to help New South Wales to Origin success – winning his second Man of the Match award in the deciding encounter – and would be named Canberra's 1992 Player of the Year, although the off-field problems from 1991 saw the club finish in the bottom five in all three grades. With Langer having his best season ever, Stuart could not regain his Test jumper, but at the beginning of the 1993 season Stuart was seen as fully fit.

A recurrence of his groin problems saw Stuart miss the opening Winfield Cup game, which the Raiders lost to a 12-man St. George. However, upon returning Stuart played in his finest form yet, leading the Raiders to a sequence of thirteen wins and a draw in fifteen games from Rounds 7 to 21, besides helping New South Wales to another Origin triumph with a third Man of the Match in the first game. A likely Canberra premiership triumph was quashed when Stuart broke his leg – ironically during a record 68–0 win against Parramatta – in the penultimate round, with the result that Canberra were easily beaten by Canterbury, St. George and Brisbane, falling from first to fourth in the process. Stuart nonetheless won the 1993 Dally M Medal for the Winfield Cup's Player of the Year, and won the Rothmans Medal with a vote total then beaten only by Mick Cronin in 1978. Stuart worked intensively to recover over the ensuing summer, and was fit for the start of the 1994 season. He then reproduced his 1993 form, leading the Raiders to an emphatic 36–12 Grand Final triumph over Canterbury and New South Wales to a fourth Origin triumph in five seasons. Although there had long been intense debate as to whether Stuart should replace Allan Langer as Test number seven, Stuart did not regain his Test place even after his third consecutive Origin win. However, on the 1994 Kangaroo Tour Stuart did take over from Langer after the Kangaroos lost the First Test and led Australia to three Test victories.

By the close of the tour, Stuart was viewed as the most influential, and possibly best, player in the world.

==== Super League, Injuries and Illness ====
Before Canberra's 1994 triumph, a "Super League" encompassing only elite teams had been envisioned by News Limited. Canberra was one of the first clubs to sign with Super League – being forced to do so because Stuart and Bradley Clyde were pursued for huge money by ARL-loyal Sydney City. Stuart was never in any doubt about Super League, despite strong counter-offers by the ARL outside of the Roosters. At the height of the conflict, Stuart's asking price rose from $700,000 to $2,500,000 during one day, as he became the public face of Super League.

Appointed captain of the Raiders to succeed the retiring Meninga, Stuart would lead them to their best-ever regular season record of twenty wins and only two losses, but after defeating the Broncos 14–8 in Brisbane they would be thrashed 6–25 by the Sydney Bulldogs in their preliminary final. However, the ARL's blanket ban on Super League players meant Stuart would not play in any representative match in 1995 – indeed as it turned out he would never play representative rugby league again.

In 1996 Stuart initially refused to play in the ARL competition when the Federal Court ordered Super League-loyal clubs to play there. The Court then forbade the commencement of any rival league, with the result that Stuart said he would rather play in England's new summer season (Note: For 1996, Super League switched from rugby's traditional winter season from September to May to a summer season from February to September.) than with the ARL. Stuart would have his season ended by a knee injury after two games. He would come back in 1997 despite concerns over another knee and a hamstring causing to miss some games and keeping him out of the Super League representative series. Although Stuart played through the rest of 1997, injuries continued to effect his performances. In 1998, after beginning the season with

an enthusiasm more akin to a player at the start of their career rather than one watching the twilight settle in

Stuart would miss one game though suspension for a high tackle and ten games through a mysterious head illness that would be diagnosed as mild encephalitis, before helping drive a previously struggling Raider team to the finals. However, concern over the salary cap, and a desire to not lose promising youngsters, led the Raiders to recognise they would not be retaining him for 1999 as early as July.

=== Canterbury-Bankstown ===
Several clubs would seek Stuart's services for the 1999 season, and there were even brief rumours that he would return to rugby union – although that sport's managers firmly rejected the idea. By the second week of August, Stuart had signed with Canterbury-Bankstown for a two-season deal. Stuart would play almost a full season in 1999 with the Bulldogs, but retired as a player at the end of May 2000 after failing to recover from a recurring knee injury. He had played a total of 243 first-grade games for the Raiders and Bulldogs since 1988.

== Coaching career ==
=== Sydney Roosters ===
After his retirement as a player, Stuart turned immediately to coaching Canterbury's Jersey Flegg team in 2001 – taking them to a premiership in his first season. Stuart began his first grade coaching career in 2002 with the Sydney Roosters, taking over from Graham Murray after an initial standoff in response to major failures in the preceding finals series. Stuart would win the premiership in his first season as senior coach, and the Roosters travelled to England to play the 2003 World Club Challenge against Super League champions, St Helens R.F.C., where Stuart coached the team to a 38–0 victory. At home in 2003 he took the Roosters to the grand final but they lost to Penrith. The 2004 Stuart-coached Roosters side was also beaten in the Grand Final, but the team struggled in 2005 and 2006. Stuart's contract was terminated and he left the Roosters two weeks before the end of the 2006 season.

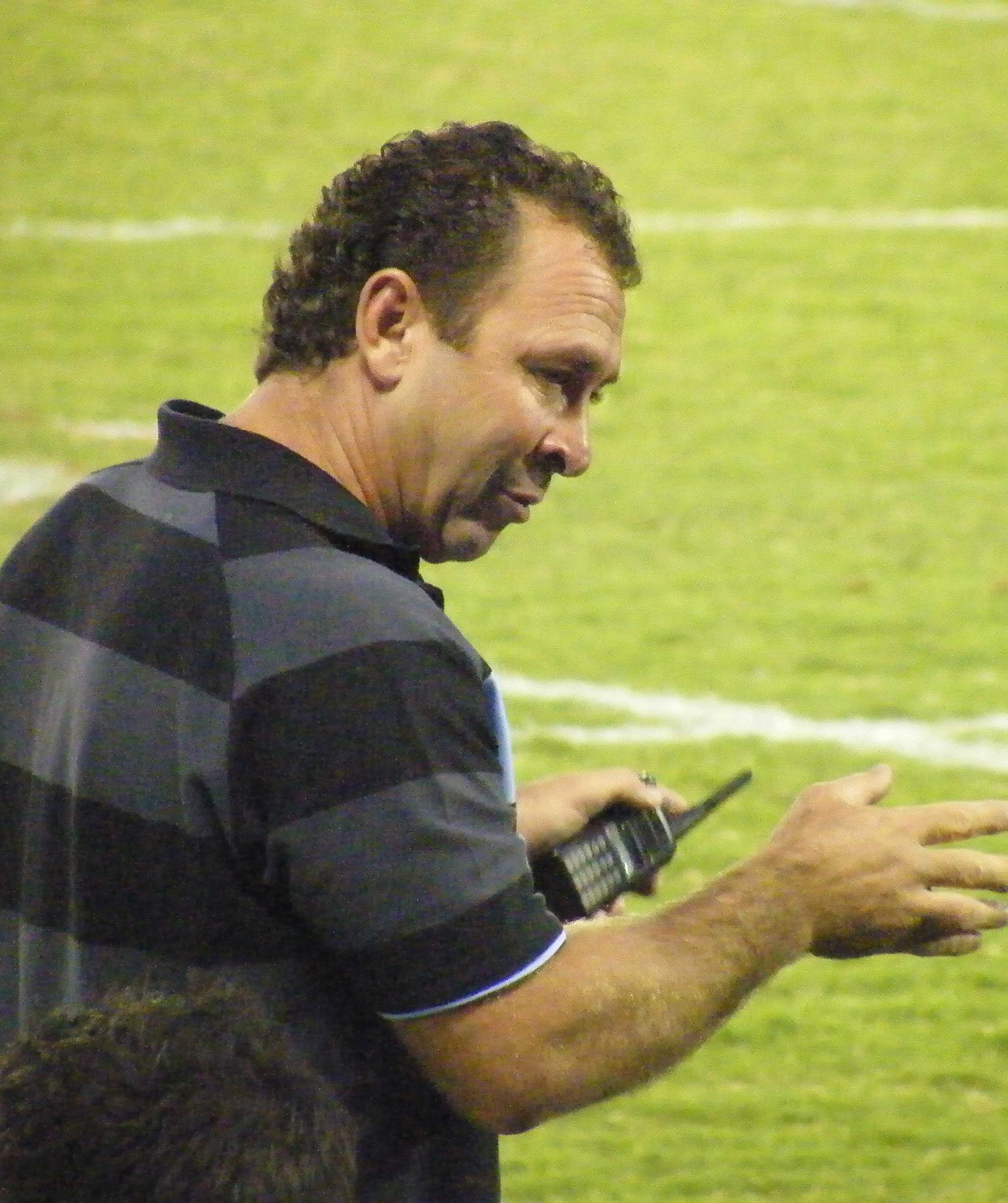
Stuart in 2009

=== Cronulla-Sutherland Sharks ===
In 2007, Stuart took over from Stuart Raper as head coach of Cronulla with a two-year contract, which was then extended to the end of the 2011 playing season.

Despite the Sharks making the preliminary finals in 2008, Stuart's time with the club was marred by a horror year in 2009. Not only was the club in dire financial straits but the Cronulla club was also tarnished by media allegations about a 2002 group-sex incident involving former Sharks players, player Reni Maitua's dismissal after testing positive to drugs, removal of the captaincy from key player Paul Gallen, due to making racist remarks and several unsavoury incidents involving now-disgraced CEO Tony Zappia. (Note: including Zappia's assault of a female staff member and involvement in an insurance-fraud fan donation scandal.)

On 19 July 2010, Stuart resigned as Cronulla-Sutherland coach six weeks before the end of the 2010 season. Stuart said that he decided to leave Cronulla after he felt that he no longer had the support of his players. Stuart went on to say

I just feel I can’t get that extra bit out of them at the moment, Talking to the players at halftime and after the game, I could probably sense with them that this was the only decision.

Stuart leaving the club ended yet another tenure prematurely and at loggerheads with club executives, members and players, with Cronulla appointing Shane Flanagan as his replacement.

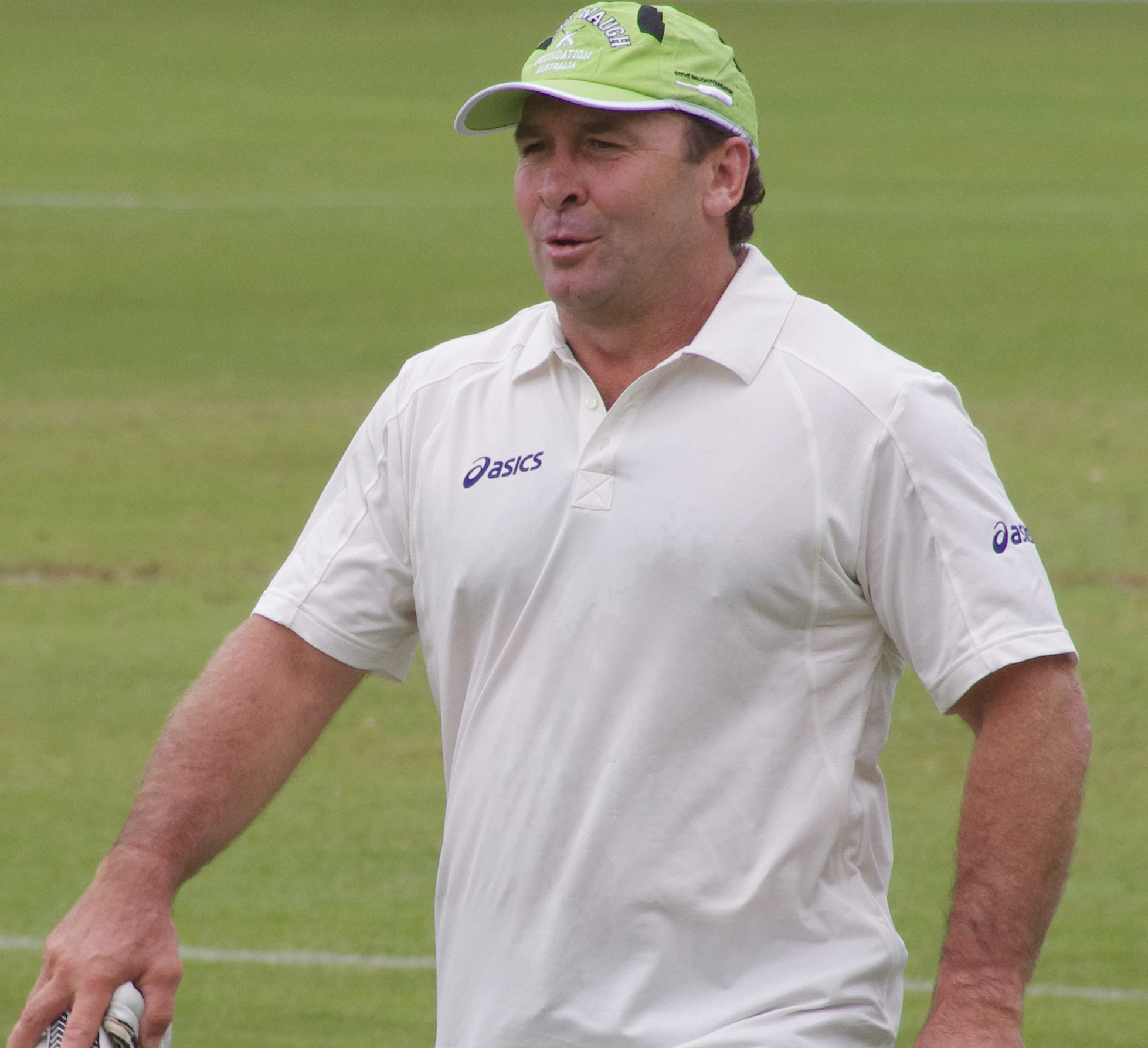
Stuart in 2011

=== Parramatta Eels ===
Stuart signed a lucrative three-year contract with the Parramatta Eels, beginning in 2013. This meant that Stuart had to stand down as the head coach of the New South Wales State of Origin team, as the state had put in a policy that the head coach would not have any relation to an NRL club. The Eels had in recent years been perennial underachievers, with Stuart set the task of resurrecting the Eels after they finished last in 2012. However, in the round 4 match against the Roosters, Stuart suffered the worst defeat in his NRL coaching career, losing 50–0. In the aftermath of the game, Stuart said at the press conference

I can't say it won't happen again, it will and I hope to turn it around quickly but it won't, it is going to take a long time to turn it around, we have to keep building our roster because it is not up to the level of other rosters".

In April 2013 Stuart was fined $10,000 for questioning a referee's impartiality following a loss to the Gold Coast. In June 2013, Stuart infamously told twelve Parramatta players via an overhead projector that their services were no longer required beyond the 2013 season.

On 11 September 2013, Stuart announced that he was quitting Parramatta to join Canberra as head coach on a three-year contract to continue his coaching career. The day after he announced his move Stuart spoke at Parramatta's presentation night saying:

I’ve been assassinated over the last day and I’ll be assassinated again tomorrow, but they are small-minded people. They don't understand the big decision I’ve had to make. It's been very hard, it's been very difficult, it’s a very big decision. I’ve had a lot of criticism today. It's not easy to take. I've had my character judged. I made a decision that’s best for my career and my family and I'll wear all the criticism.

=== Canberra Raiders ===
Stuart took up the head coach position of Canberra on a three-year deal in 2014.

Following Canberra's loss in round 10 of the 2014 season, Stuart spoke to the media saying:

When you get s*** refereeing, sorry, when you get poor refereeing decisions that are just incorrect, purely incorrect, that frustrates you because it’s a tight competition and every game’s a tight game

Stuart was later fined $10,000 by the NRL for his post match comments.

In 2016, Stuart coached Canberra to a second-placed finish at the end of the regular season. In week one of the finals, Canberra were upset in front of a sold-out home crowd losing to eventual premiers Cronulla 16–14. Canberra would defeat Penrith the following week to qualify for the club's first preliminary final in nineteen years. Canberra went on to fall short of a grand final appearance losing to Melbourne 14–12.

In July 2018 after a match against Cronulla in which a refereeing mistake leading to a try cost the Raiders the game, Stuart demanded that the NRL overhaul the bunker system responsible for reviewing potential tries.

In the 2019 season, Stuart guided Canberra to a 4th-place finish at the end of the regular season. Canberra would then go on to defeat Melbourne and South Sydney to qualify for their first grand final since 1994. In the Grand Final against the Roosters, Canberra lost the match 14–8 in controversial circumstances. During the second half of the game and with only 10 minutes remaining, Canberra were initially given a new six tackle set after referee Ben Cummins had ruled that the Roosters had touched the ball. Canberra player Jack Wighton would then be tackled with the ball. Cummins later ruled that it was not a repeat set and it was a handover to the Sydney Roosters. In the following minutes, Roosters player James Tedesco would score the match winning try.

In the post-match press conference, Stuart told the media:

You all saw it. None of us here will be commenting on that tonight. It's not the time to talk about it.

In the 2020 NRL season, Stuart guided Canberra to a fifth-placed finish on the table as they qualified for the finals. Canberra would eventually reach the preliminary final before losing to Melbourne 30–10. In the post match press conference, Stuart walked out after answering only one question.

In round 8 of the 2021 NRL season, Canberra were defeated by South Sydney 34–20 which included two tries that were disallowed against Canberra. In the post match press conference Stuart said:

I'll look like a whinger, which I don't really give a shit about being labelled a whinger, but when you get a game out there where it's 8–1 in penalties, I just think it needs a discussion.

Canberra would finish the 2021 NRL season in a disappointing tenth place on the table after the club were tipped to reach the finals and once again challenge for the premiership. Following Canberra's 36–6 loss against Penrith in round 7 of the 2022 NRL season, Stuart was asked by journalists following the match on his thoughts about the Penrith crowd mocking Canberra's Viking clap. Stuart responded with

Is that really a big focus point?, Well if that is all we have got to talk about FMD.

Following Canberra's loss against Penrith in round 21 of the 2022 NRL season, Stuart commented on Penrith player Jaeman Salmon who had kicked out at Canberra's Tom Starling while he was playing the ball. Stuart went on to say

I’ve had history with that kid. I know that kid very well. He was a weak gutted dog as a kid and he hasn’t changed now. He's a weak gutted dog person now.

On 9 August 2022, Stuart was fined $25,000 and suspended for one match from the NRL over his comments towards Salmon. Following Canberra's 48–2 loss against Melbourne in round 24 of the 2023 NRL season, Stuart walked out after just 80 seconds of the post match press conference. Stuart said

It wasn't tough at all. It was just embarrassing. (I'm) absolutely embarrassed, I'll talk tomorrow about it. I'm not trying to be disrespectful to you mate. I just ain't in the mood for talking. Really, it's just… I'm here because I have to be.

Stuart guided Canberra to an 8th-place finish in the 2023 NRL season, but the Raiders would go on to be eliminated in the first week as they lost their elimination final against Newcastle 30–28 in golden point extra-time. In 2024, Stuart coached his 250th game for Canberra against the New Zealand Warriors. They would go on to lose 18–10. Following Canberra's round 6 golden point victory over the Gold Coast, Stuart said in the post match press conference

F*** me. He's on another planet, If he's critical of the six-agains and the penalties, he's on another planet.He coached well, but the way they cheated with hands on the ball [in tackles], the way they cheated on the ground.

Stuart said this in relation to Des Hasler stating that the referees were unfavourable towards the Gold Coast. In round 8 of the 2024 NRL season, Stuart coached his 500th first grade game which would end in a 40–0 loss against one of his former clubs in Cronulla.

In the 2025 NRL season, Stuart guided Canberra to the Minor Premiership, the clubs first season since 1990. Canberra were heavy favourites to make the grand final in 2025 but lost both finals matches at home against Brisbane and Cronulla respectively. The finals match against Brisbane was described as one of the greatest in the modern era with Canberra losing in extra-time 29-28. For his efforts throughout the season, Stuart won the 2025 Dally M head coach of the year award.

Stuart was unable to replicate what he achieved with Canberra in 2025 as the club slumped to an eleventh placed finish in the 2026 NRL season.

=== Representative coaching ===
==== State of Origin ====
In 2005, Stuart was appointed coach of the New South Wales. Although Stuart only coached the NSW side for just one series, the Blues managed to win the series 2–1 after losing the first match in golden point. On 17 November 2010, Stuart was appointed as the state's first full-time coach of the New South Wales State of Origin team for two years. Stuart's victory in 2005 was the last time NSW won an origin series until the Laurie Daley-coached Blues won in 2014.

Stuart coached the Blues for the 2011 series, which was lost to the Maroons by two games to one.

Stuart continued in the NSW head coaching role for the 2012 series, which was once again lost by two games to one. For the second consecutive year however, New South Wales won Game II in Sydney. Shortly after signing on as Parramatta Eels coach for the 2013 season onwards, Stuart resigned from his role as NSW coach.

==== Australia ====
In December 2005, Stuart was appointed as coach of Australian national rugby league team, replacing Wayne Bennett after Australia's loss in the 2005 Tri-Nations Final to New Zealand by a scoreline of 24–0. This meant that Stuart had to stand down as coach of the New South Wales State of Origin team. Stuart enjoyed success with the Kangaroos: winning the Anzac Tests of 2006 and 2007, as well as the 2006 Tri-Nations. In addition, at the end of the 2007 season, the team won a one-off Test against New Zealand.

===== 2008 World Cup controversy =====
Stuart's Australian team lost the 2008 Rugby League World Cup Final to New Zealand, 34–20. Afterwards he was reported to be so incensed by the defeat that he verbally attacked Geoff Carr, the Chief Executive of Australian Rugby League, claiming that tournament organisers and match officials conspired to cause the Australian loss. The next morning he had a chance meeting with Ashley Klein, who refereed the final, and Stuart Cummings, England's director of referees, at their hotel. He is reported to have verbally abused both officials in front of a number of witnesses, calling Klein a cheat, and of being physically and aggressively intimidating.

=== Statistics ===
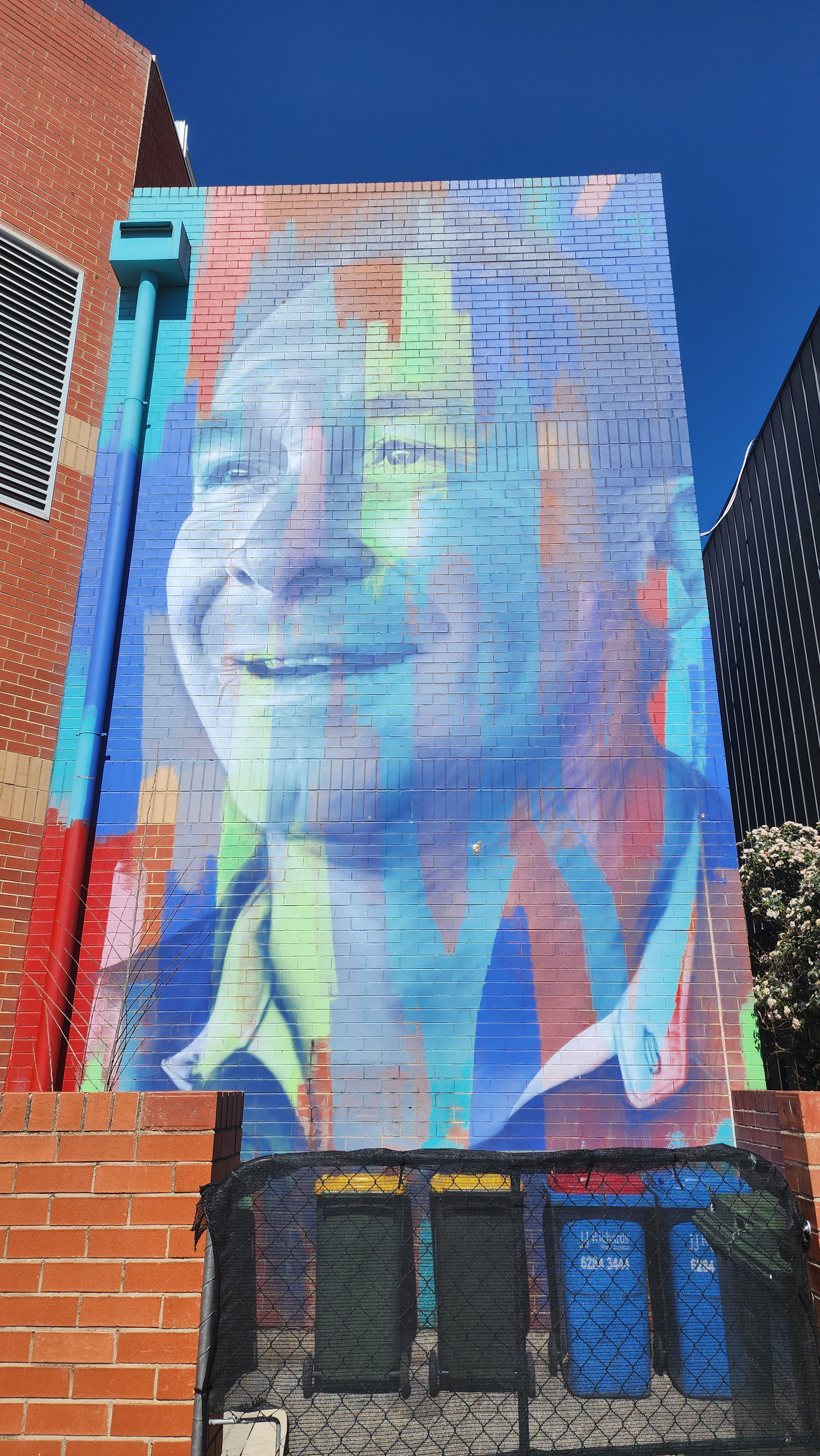
His mural at the southern end of Blacksmith's Lane in Queanbeyan

Ricky Stuart – Coaching Results by Season
Year	NRL Team	Games	Wins	Draws	Losses	Win %	Notes
2002	Sydney Roosters	28	19	1	8	68%	Won 2002 NRL Grand Final against New Zealand Warriors
2003	Sydney Roosters	27	19	0	8	70%	Lost 2003 NRL Grand Final against Penrith Panthers
2004	Sydney Roosters	27	21	0	6	78%	Lost 2004 NRL Grand Final against Bulldogs
2005	Sydney Roosters	24	11	0	13	46%	Finished 9th (out of 15)
2006	Sydney Roosters	24	8	0	16	33%	Finished 14th (out of 15)
2007	Cronulla-Sutherland Sharks	24	10	0	14	42%	Finished 11th (out of 16)
2008	Cronulla-Sutherland Sharks	26	18	0	8	69%	Lost Grand Final qualifier against Melbourne Storm
2009	Cronulla-Sutherland Sharks	24	5	0	19	21%	Finished 15th (out of 16)
2010	Cronulla-Sutherland Sharks	17	5	0	12	29%	Resigned with 6 rounds remaining
2013	Parramatta Eels	24	5	0	19	21%	Finished 16th (out of 16)
2014	Canberra Raiders	24	8	0	16	33%	Finished 15th (out of 16)
2015	Canberra Raiders	24	10	0	14	42%	Finished 10th (out of 16)
2016	Canberra Raiders	27	18	1	8	67%	Lost Preliminary Final to Melbourne Storm.
2017	Canberra Raiders	24	11	0	13	46%	Finished 10th (out of 16)
2018	Canberra Raiders	24	10	0	14	42%	Finished 10th (out of 16)
2019	Canberra Raiders	27	17	0	10	63%	Lost 2019 NRL Grand Final to Sydney Roosters
2020	Canberra Raiders	23	16	0	7	70%	Lost Preliminary Final to Melbourne Storm.
2021	Canberra Raiders	24	10	0	14	42%	Finished 10th (out of 16)
2022	Canberra Raiders	25	14	0	11	56%	Finished 8th (out of 16), suspended for round 22 match
2023	Canberra Raiders	25	13	0	12	52%	Finished 8th (out of 17)
2024	Canberra Raiders	24	12	0	12	50%	Finished 9th (out of 17)
2025	Canberra Raiders	26	19	0	7	73%	Finished 1st (out of 17)
Career		542	279	2	261	52%	

== Personal life ==
Stuart is married to his wife Kaylie and they have three children – daughter Emma and two sons Jackson and rugby league player Jed.

Stuart was appointed a Member of the Order of Australia in the 2021 Queen's Birthday Honours, for significant service to rugby league, and to the community. Stuart had previously received the Australian Sports Medal in October 2000.

== The Ricky Stuart Foundation ==
In 2011, inspired by his daughter being diagnosed with autism, Stuart and his wife founded the Ricky Stuart Foundation, a charity which aims to raise support for autism and to assist with the provision of carers and support for families. The Raiders replace their major jersey sponsor for one round each year with the foundation's logo to help raise further support.

== Notes ==
Sporting positions
Preceded by Mal Meninga	Canberra Raiders captain 1995–97	Succeeded by Laurie Daley
