= Savelio Tamale =

Australian rugby league footballer (born 2005)

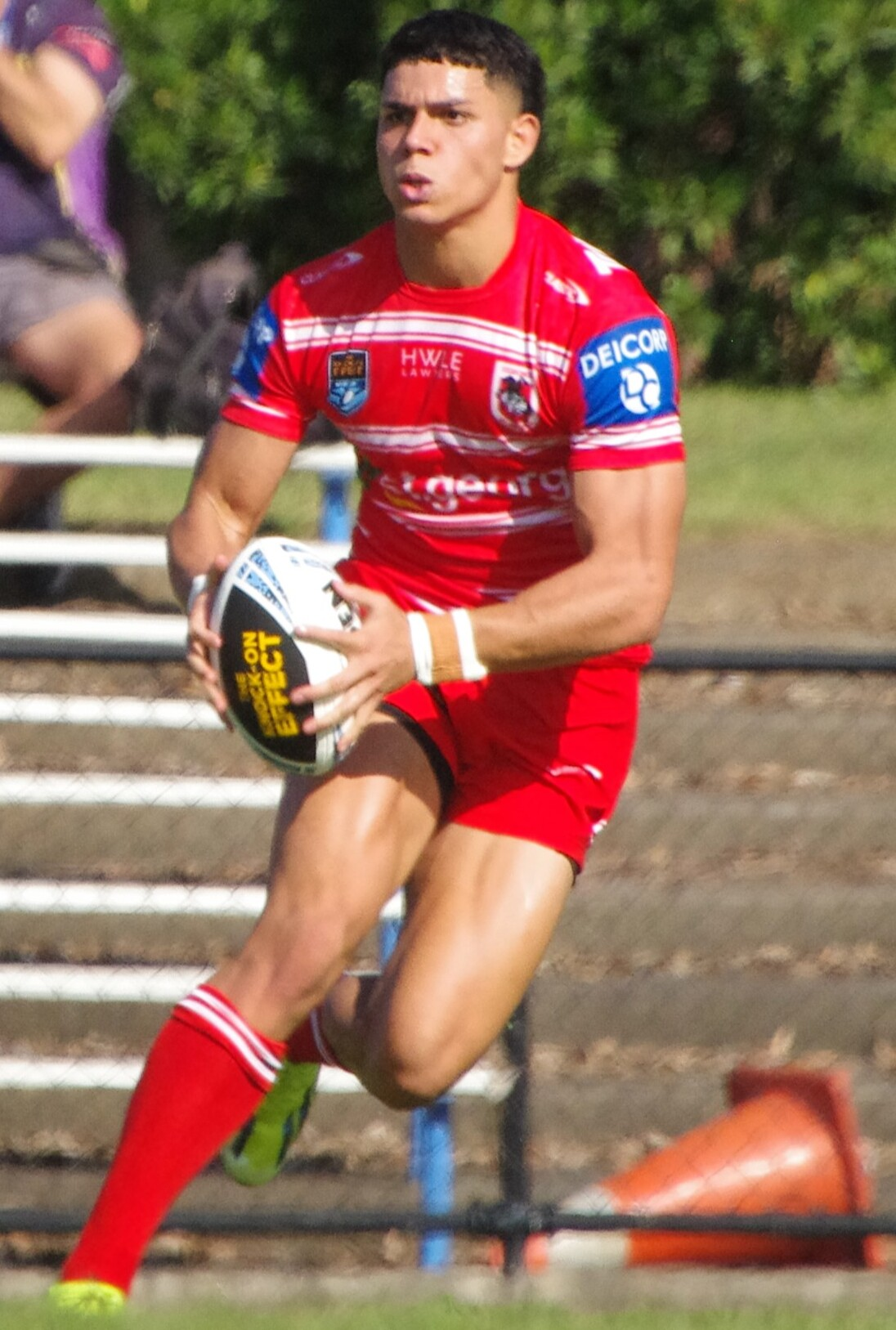

Personal information
- Full name: Savelio Tamale
- Born: 6 December 2004 (age 21) Manly, New South Wales
- Height: 182 cm (6 ft 0 in)
- Weight: 96 kg (15 st 2 lb)

Playing information
- Position: Wing, Centre
Club
| Years | Team | Pld | T | G | FG | P |
|---|---|---|---|---|---|---|
| 2024 | St. George Illawarra | 1 | 0 | 0 | 0 | 0 |
| 2025– | Canberra Raiders | 33 | 14 | 0 | 0 | 56 |
| | Total | 34 | 14 | 0 | 0 | 56 |
- Source: As of 15 August 2026

Savelio Tamale (born 6 December 2004) is an Australian professional rugby league footballer who plays as a winger for the Canberra Raiders in the National Rugby League.

== Early career ==
Tamale attended St Paul's Catholic College and played both rugby union and rugby league growing up.

Tamale was selected for the NSW U19's State of Origin team, playing Wing scoring a try in the match.

== Career ==
In Round 27 2024, Tamale made his first grade debut for St. George Illawarra against the Canberra Raiders at Netstrata Jubilee Oval in a 26–24 loss.

Tamale signed a two-year deal with the Canberra Raiders until 2026. In Round 1 2025, Tamale made his Canberra debut against the New Zealand Warriors at Allegiant Stadium in Las Vegas. On 1 July 2025, Canberra announced that Tamale had signed a two-year extension until the end of 2028. Tamale played 18 matches for Canberra in the 2025 NRL season as the club claimed the Minor Premiership. He played in both finals matches as Canberra went out in straight sets losing to both Brisbane and Cronulla. He played 15 matches for Canberra in the 2026 NRL season as the club finished 11th on the table and missed the finals.

== Statistics ==
| Year | Team | Games | Tries | Pts |
|---|---|---|---|---|
| 2024 | St. George Illawarra Dragons | 1 | | |
| 2025 | Canberra Raiders | 18 | 7 | 28 |
| 2026 | Canberra Raiders | 15 | 7 | 28 |
| | Totals | 34 | 14 | 56 |
