= Joe Roddy =

Australian rugby league footballer

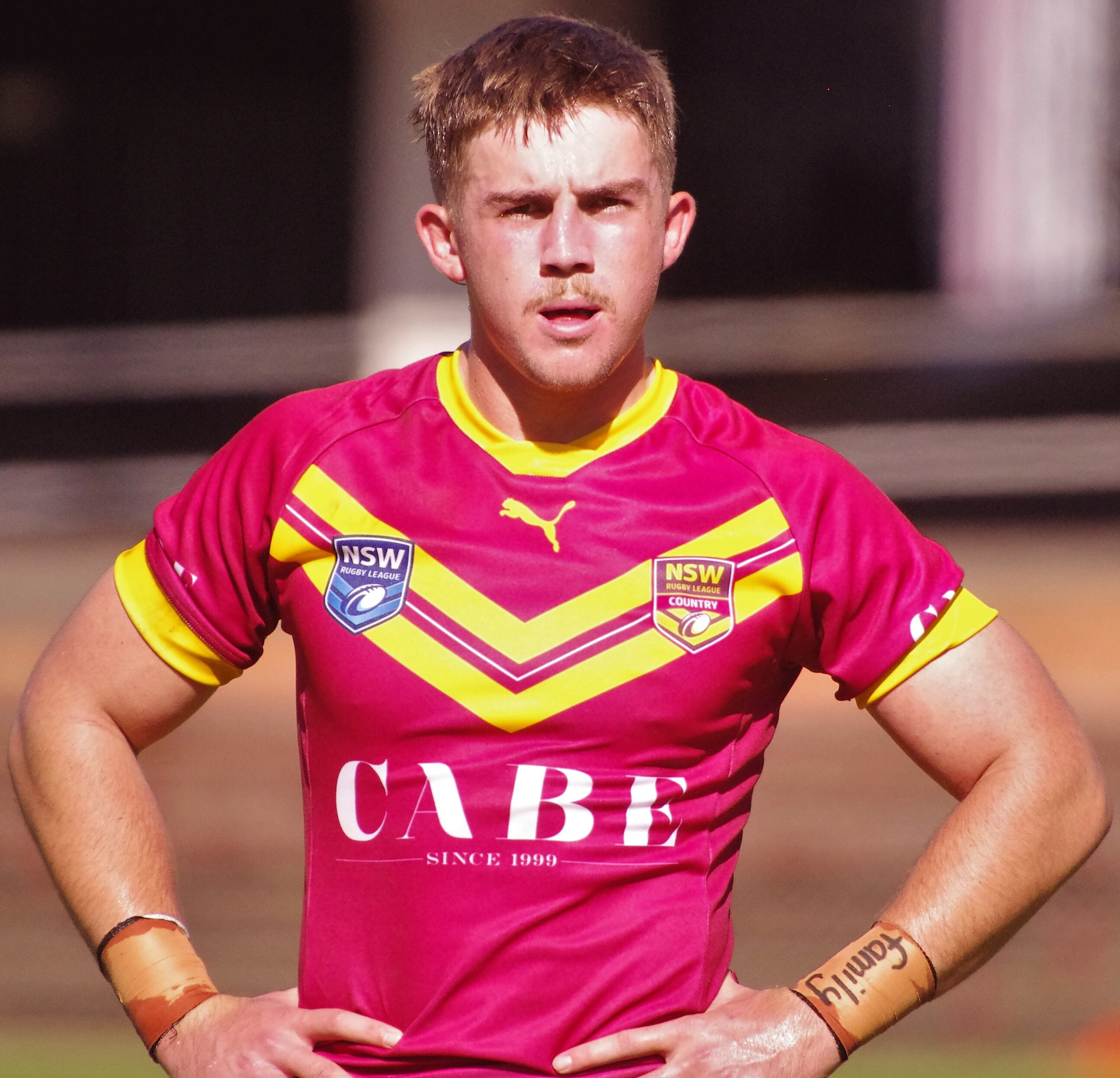

Personal information
- Full name: Joseph Roddy
- Born: 10 October 2004 (age 22) Tumut, New South Wales, Australia
- Weight: 103 kg (16 st 3 lb)

Playing information
- Position: Second-row
Club
Years	Team	Pld	T	G	FG	P
2025–	Canberra Raiders	8	2	0	0	8
- Source: As of 5 September 2026

Joe Roddy (born 10 October 2004) is an Australian professional rugby league footballer who plays as a second-row forward for the Canberra Raiders in the National Rugby League (NRL).

== Background ==
Roddy grew up in Tumut, where he played his junior football for the Tumut Blues. In 2023, he signed with the Canberra Raiders. He played for the Raiders SG Ball and Jersey Flegg teams before debuting for their NSW Cup team late in 2023. Roddy re-signed with the Raiders until the end of 2026.

== Career ==
In Round 27 of the 2025 NRL season, Roddy made his debut for the Raiders against the Dolphins at Kayo Stadium in Redcliffe. He came off the bench, scoring a double in a 62-24 loss.

On 25 June 2026, the Raiders announced that Roddy had re-signed with the club until the end of 2030.
