= Jamal Fogarty =

Australian rugby league footballer

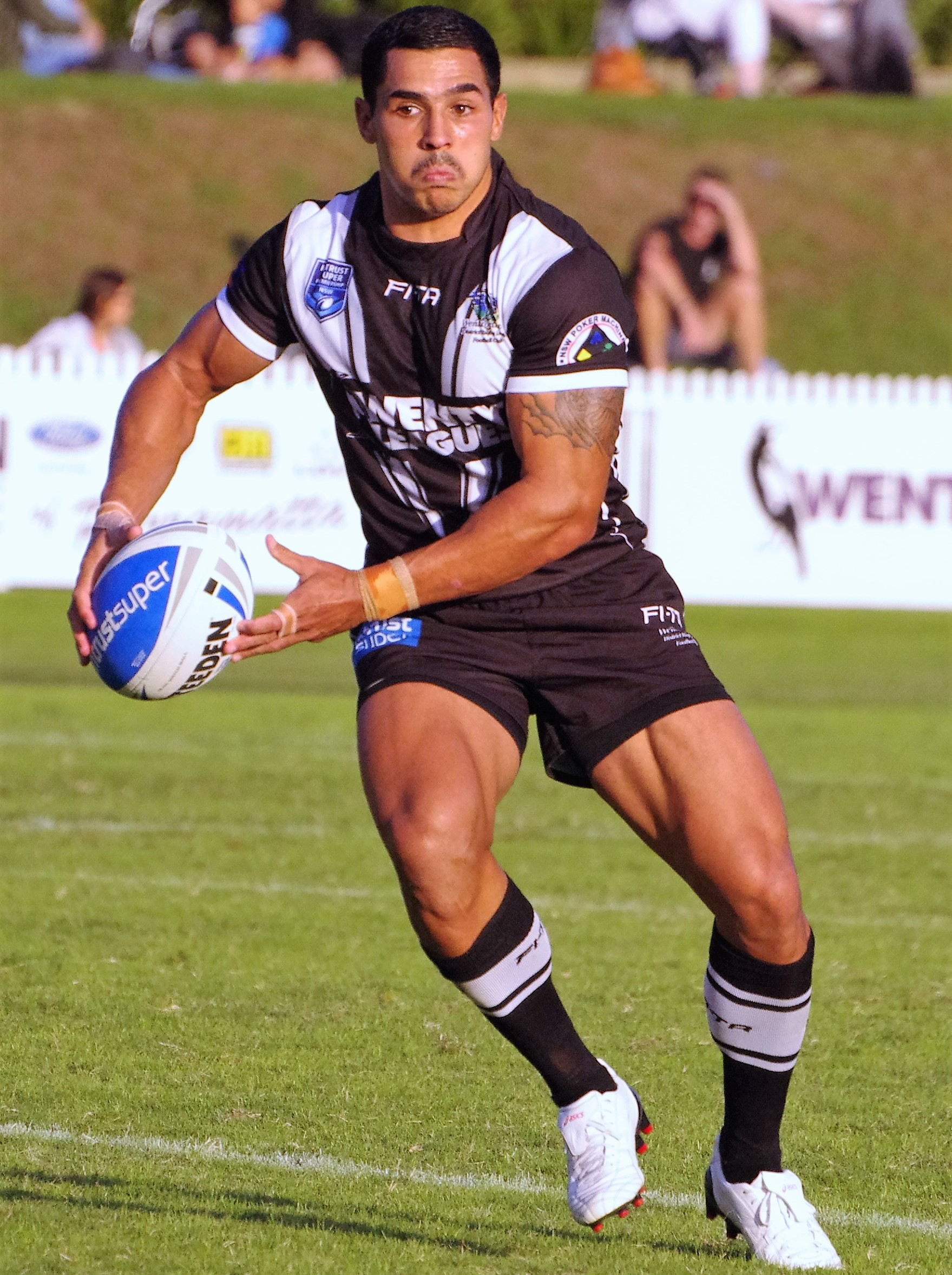

Personal information
- Born: 13 December 1993 (age 32) Beaudesert, Queensland, Australia
- Height: 174 cm (5 ft 9 in)
- Weight: 87 kg (13 st 10 lb)

Playing information
- Position: Halfback
Club
Years	Team	Pld	T	G	FG	P
2017–21	Gold Coast Titans	41	7	79	0	186
2022–25	Canberra Raiders	77	8	216	4	468
2026–	Manly Sea Eagles	22	4	66	1	149
	Total	140	19	361	5	803
Representative
Years	Team	Pld	T	G	FG	P
2018	Queensland Residents	1	0	0	0	0
2021–26	Indigenous All Stars	2	0	1	0	2
2024	Prime Minister's XIII	1	0	0	0	0
- Source: As of 5 September 2026

Jamal Fogarty (born 13 December 1993) is an Australian professional rugby league footballer who plays as a halfback for the Manly-Warringah Sea Eagles in the National Rugby League.

He previously played for the Gold Coast Titans and the Canberra Raiders in the NRL. Fogarty has represented both the Indigenous All Stars and the Prime Minister's XIII as a halfback.

== Background ==
Fogarty was born in Beaudesert, Queensland, Australia, and is a member of the Mununjali clan of the Yugambeh people. He played his junior rugby league for the Beaudesert Kingfishers, before being signed by the Gold Coast Titans. Fogarty attended Palm Beach Currumbin State High School and prior to that Beaudesert State High School.

== Playing career ==
=== Early career ===
In October 2011, Fogarty played for the Australian Schoolboys. In 2012 and 2013, he played for the Gold Coast Titans' NYC team, before graduating to their Queensland Cup team, Tweed Heads Seagulls in 2014. In 2016, he joined Queensland Cup team Burleigh Bears. He was a member of the Burleigh Bears 2016 Queensland Cup winning side, defeating the Redcliffe Dolphins in the final. In November 2016, he signed a one-year contract with the Parramatta Eels, starting in 2017.

=== 2017 ===
In June, after spending the season so far playing for Eels' feeder club, Wentworthville Magpies, Fogarty was granted a release mid-season to return to the Burleigh Bears.

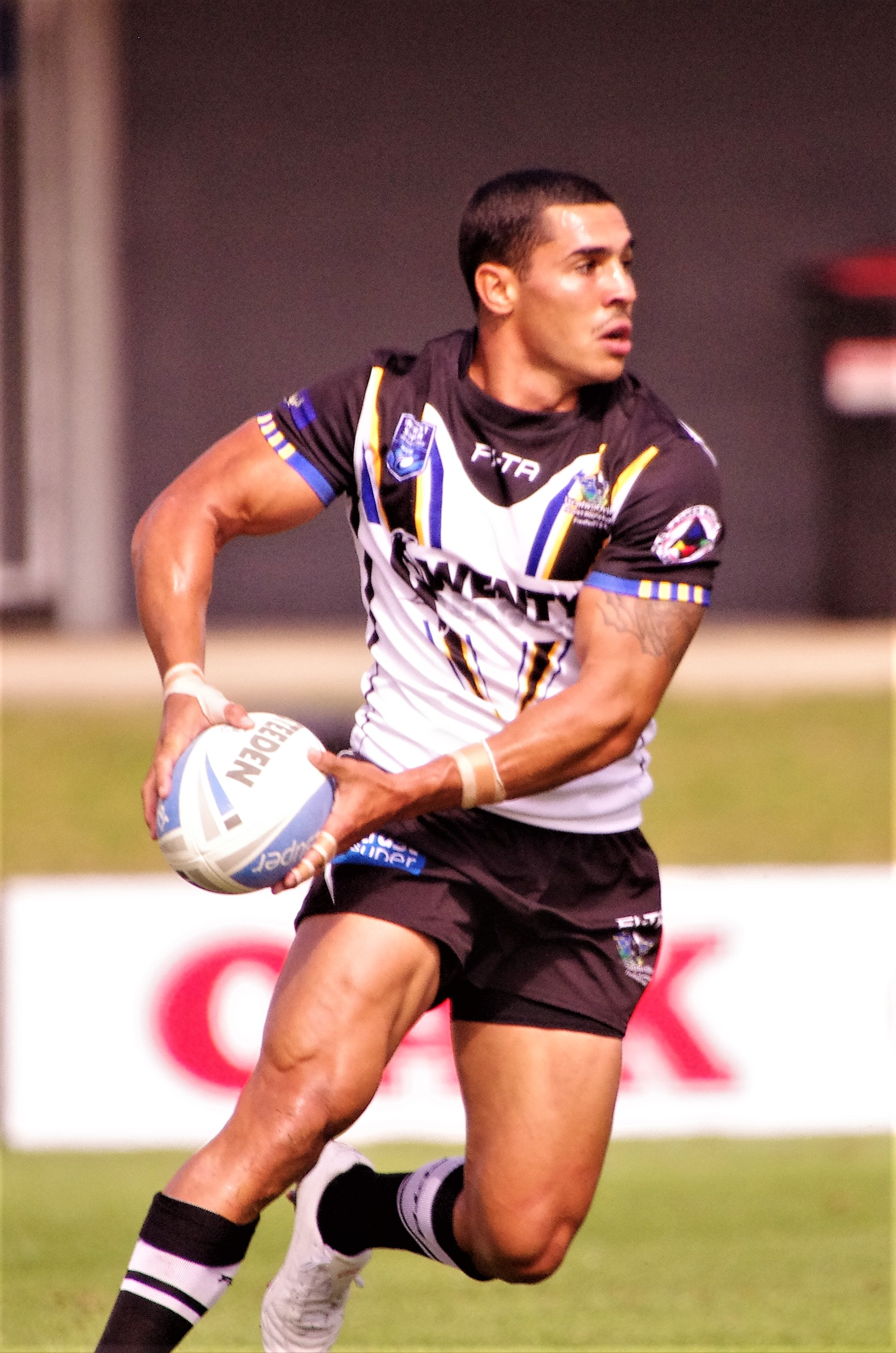
Fogarty playing for the Wentworthville Magpies in 2017

He signed a contract with the Titans and just under a fortnight after being released by the Eels, he made his NRL debut for the Titans in round 16 of the 2017 NRL season against the Wests Tigers.

=== 2018 ===
Fogarty made no appearances for Gold Coast Titans in 2018 and spent the entire year playing for the Burleigh Bears making 17 appearances in total.

=== 2019 ===
In 2019, Fogarty rejoined the Burleigh Bears full-time, starting at halfback in their Grand Final win over the Wynnum Manly Seagulls. On 27 September, Fogarty won the Petero Civoniceva Medal at the QRL awards.

=== 2020 ===
On 7 March, Fogarty signed with the Gold Coast Titans on a two-year deal. In round 9 2020, Fogarty scored his first points in the top grade by kicking a conversion in the 16-12 win over New Zealand Warriors. In round 15, Fogarty was named as the captain of the team in the absence of Kevin Proctor. In the same match, Fogarty was chased down by Canberra forward Josh Papalii after seemingly running away to score a try. Following the game, Fogarty spoke to the media saying, "I was very embarrassed. I've been copping a lot of text messages from people so I think I might throw my phone in the bin after the last couple of days".

The following week, Fogarty scored the winning try as the Gold Coast defeated St. George 14-10 at Kogarah Oval.

=== 2021 ===
On 2 February, Fogarty was named at halfback in the Indigenous All Stars team to play the New Zealand Māori at Queensland Country Bank Stadium.

Fogarty asked the Gold Coast club for a release in September 2021 due to it becoming apparent that Toby Sexton would land the starting halfback role for 2022. He signed for the Canberra Raiders on a three-year deal shortly afterwards.

=== 2022 ===
On 2 March, Fogarty was ruled out for four months with a knee injury which he sustained in Canberra's pre-season trial against Manly. In round 12 of the 2022 NRL season, Fogarty made his club debut for Canberra in their 28-20 loss against Parramatta. In round 25, Fogarty scored one try and kicked seven goals in Canberra's 56-10 victory over wooden spooners the Wests Tigers. Fogarty played a total of 15 games for Canberra in 2022 as the club finished 8th on the table and qualified for the finals. Fogarty played in both finals matches as Canberra were eliminated in the second week by Parramatta.

=== 2023 ===
In round 9 of the 2023 NRL season, Fogarty scored a try and kicked his first career field goal to give Canberra a 31-30 golden point extra-time victory over the Dolphins. In round 14, Fogarty scored two tries and kicked a penalty goal with three minutes remaining to win the game for Canberra 20-19 against the Wests Tigers. Fogarty played a total of 24 matches for Canberra in the 2023 NRL season as the club finished 8th on the table and qualified for the finals. He played in Canberra's golden point extra-time elimination final loss to Newcastle.

=== 2024 ===
In round 6 of the 2024 NRL season, Fogarty kicked the winning field goal for Canberra in golden point extra-time against his former club, the Gold Coast, which saw Canberra earn a 21-20 victory. Fogarty played 14 matches for Canberra in the 2024 NRL season as the club finished 9th on the table.

=== 2025 ===
On 29 April, it was revealed that Fogarty had informed the Canberra club of his decision to leave them and join Manly Warringah Sea Eagles on a three-year deal. On 14 May, Manly officially announced the signing of Fogarty.

=== 2026 ===
In round 1 of the 2026 NRL season, Fogarty made his club debut for Manly in their 29-28 golden point extra-time loss against Canberra. Fogarty played 22 matches for Manly in the 2026 NRL season as the club finished 9th on the table.

== Statistics ==
Season	Team	Apps	Tries	Goals	FG	Pts
2017	Gold Coast Titans	2	0	0	0	0
2020	Gold Coast Titans	18	3	9	0	30
2021	Gold Coast Titans	21	4	70	0	156
2022	Canberra Raiders	15	3	52	0	116
2023	Canberra Raiders	24	3	23	2	70
2024	Canberra Raiders	14	0	44	2	90
2025	Canberra Raiders	24	2	92		192
2026	Manly Warringah Sea Eagles	17	4	47	1	111
	Totals	135	19	342	5	765

== Achievements and accolades ==
=== Individual ===
- Petero Civoniceva Medal: 2019
- Queensland Cup Team of the Year: 2016
