= Grant Anderson (rugby league, born 1999) =

Australian rugby league footballer

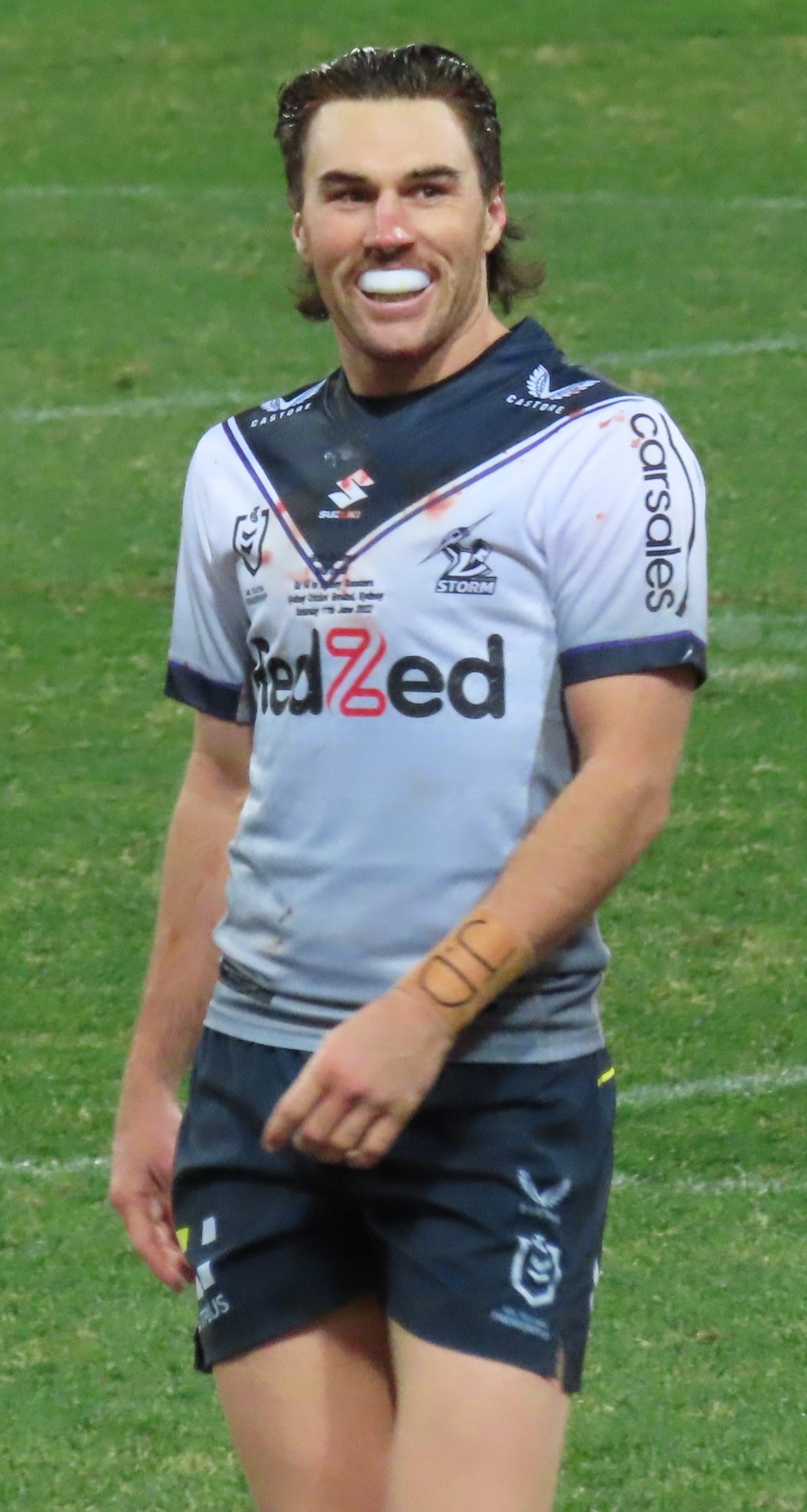

Personal information
- Born: 30 September 1999 (age 27) Belmont, New South Wales, Australia
- Height: 187 cm (6 ft 2 in)
- Weight: 92 kg (14 st 7 lb)

Playing information
- Position: Wing, Centre
Club
| Years | Team | Pld | T | G | FG | P |
|---|---|---|---|---|---|---|
| 2022–25 | Melbourne Storm | 50 | 23 | 0 | 0 | 92 |
| 2026 | Brisbane Broncos | 12 | 4 | 0 | 0 | 16 |
| 2027– | New Zealand Warriors | 0 | 0 | 0 | 0 | 0 |
| | Total | 62 | 27 | 0 | 0 | 108 |
- Source: As of 6 October 2026
- Relatives: Kain Anderson (younger brother)

Grant Anderson (born 30 September 1999) is an Australian professional rugby league footballer who plays as a winger or centre for the New Zealand Warriors in the National Rugby League (NRL).

== Early life ==
Anderson was born in Belmont, New South Wales and grew up in Swansea, New South Wales. He was educated at Hunter Sports High School, Newcastle.

Grant played junior rugby league for the Central Charlestown Butcher Boys and Valentine-Eleebana Red Devils before signing with Newcastle Knights.

== Playing career ==
=== Early career ===
After playing junior representatives for Newcastle Knights, Anderson played for the Northern Pride during the 2021 Queensland Cup season, scoring nine tries in 15 appearances. He transferred to Sunshine Coast Falcons ahead of the 2022 Queensland Cup season, after spending the preseason with Melbourne Storm.

=== Melbourne Storm: 2022–2025 ===
In round 14 of the 2022 NRL season, Anderson made his club debut (cap 222) for the Melbourne Storm against the Sydney Roosters, as he replaced Xavier Coates who injured his ankle during the first game of State of Origin. Anderson would make six appearances for Melbourne, with his two tries on debut the highlight.

In round 27 of the 2023 NRL season, Anderson scored two tries for Melbourne in their 32–22 victory over Brisbane. Anderson played a total of six games for Melbourne as they finished third on the table.

In July 2024, Anderson extended his contract with the Melbourne Storm until the end of the 2025 season.

In June 2025, the Melbourne Storm confirmed that Anderson would leave the club at the end of the season to take up a contract with the Brisbane Broncos.

=== Brisbane Broncos: 2026 ===
On 30 March 2026, Brisbane announced Anderson would be ruled out for 10–12 after suffering an MCL tear and Tibial Plateau fracture.

=== New Zealand Warriors: 2027– ===
On 16 April 2026, the New Zealand Warriors and Brisbane announced the finalisation of the Mitch Barnett sign/trade deal with Anderson being released by the club to join the New Zealand Warriors on a three-year deal from 2027.

== Statistics ==
| Year | Team | Games | Tries | Pts |
|---|---|---|---|---|
| 2022 | Melbourne Storm | 6 | 2 | 8 |
| 2023 | Melbourne Storm | 4 | 2 | 8 |
| 2024 | Melbourne Storm | 14 | 8 | 32 |
| 2025 | Melbourne Storm | 24 | 11 | 44 |
| 2026 | Brisbane Broncos | 12 | 4 | 16 |
| | Totals | 60 | 27 | 108 |
