= Kain Anderson =

Australian rugby league player

Personal information
- Full name: Kain Anderson
- Born: 15 March 2002 (age 24) Newcastle, New South Wales, Australia

Playing information
- Position: Centre
Club
Years	Team	Pld	T	G	FG	P
2025–26	Canberra Raiders	1	0	0	0	0
2027–	Dolphins	0	0	0	0	0
	Total	1	0	0	0	0
- Source: As of 14 November 2026
- Relatives: Grant Anderson (brother)

Kain Anderson is an Australian professional rugby league footballer who plays as a centre for the Dolphins in the National Rugby League (NRL).

== Career ==
=== 2025 ===
In round 27 of the 2025 NRL season, Anderson made his NRL debut for the Canberra Raiders coming off the bench against the Dolphins in a 62-24 loss at Kayo Stadium in Redcliffe.

=== 2026 ===
On 25 August 2026, it was announced that Anderson would be departing the Canberra club after not being offered a new contract.

On 15 October 2026 it was announced that the Dolphins had signed Anderson on a two year deal.
