= Owen Pattie =

Australian rugby league footballer (born 2004)

Personal information
- Full name: Owen Pattie
- Born: 22 January 2004 (age 22) Monto, Queensland, Australia
- Height: 175 cm (5 ft 9 in)
- Weight: 84 kg (13 st 3 lb)

Playing information
- Position: Hooker
Club
Years	Team	Pld	T	G	FG	P
2025–	Canberra Raiders	41	6	0	0	24
Representative
Years	Team	Pld	T	G	FG	P
2026	Prime Minister's XIII	1	0	0	0	0
- Source: As of 22 November 2026

Owen Pattie (born 22 January 2004) is an Australian professional rugby league footballer who plays as a hooker for the Canberra Raiders in the National Rugby League.

== Early career ==
Growing up in Monto, Queensland, Pattie attended St. Brendan's College in Yeppoon when he was scouted to join the Raiders pathway system. Pattie became a key member of the Raiders SG Ball and Jersey Flegg squads, being named 2024 Jersey Flegg player of the year. In 2024, Pattie signed a long term deal with Canberra which expires at the end of the 2028 season.

== Playing career ==
=== 2025 ===
Pattie made his first grade debut for Canberra in his side's 30−8 victory over the New Zealand Warriors at Allegiant Stadium in Las Vegas in round 1 of the 2025 NRL season. Pattie played 26 games for Canberra in the 2025 NRL season as the club claimed the Minor Premiership. he played in both finals matches as Canberra went out in straight sets losing to both Brisbane and Cronulla. Pattie played 15 matches for Canberra in the 2026 NRL season as the club finished 11th on the table and missed the finals.

=== 2026 ===
He made his Prime Minister's XIII début on 3 October 2026 in the 10-60 win over PNG Prime Minister's XIII in Port Moresby.

== Statistics ==
Year	Team	Games	Tries	Pts
2025	Canberra Raiders	26	2	8
2026	Canberra Raiders	13	3	12
2027	Canberra Raiders			
	Totals	40	6	24
