= Xavier Savage =

Australian rugby league footballer

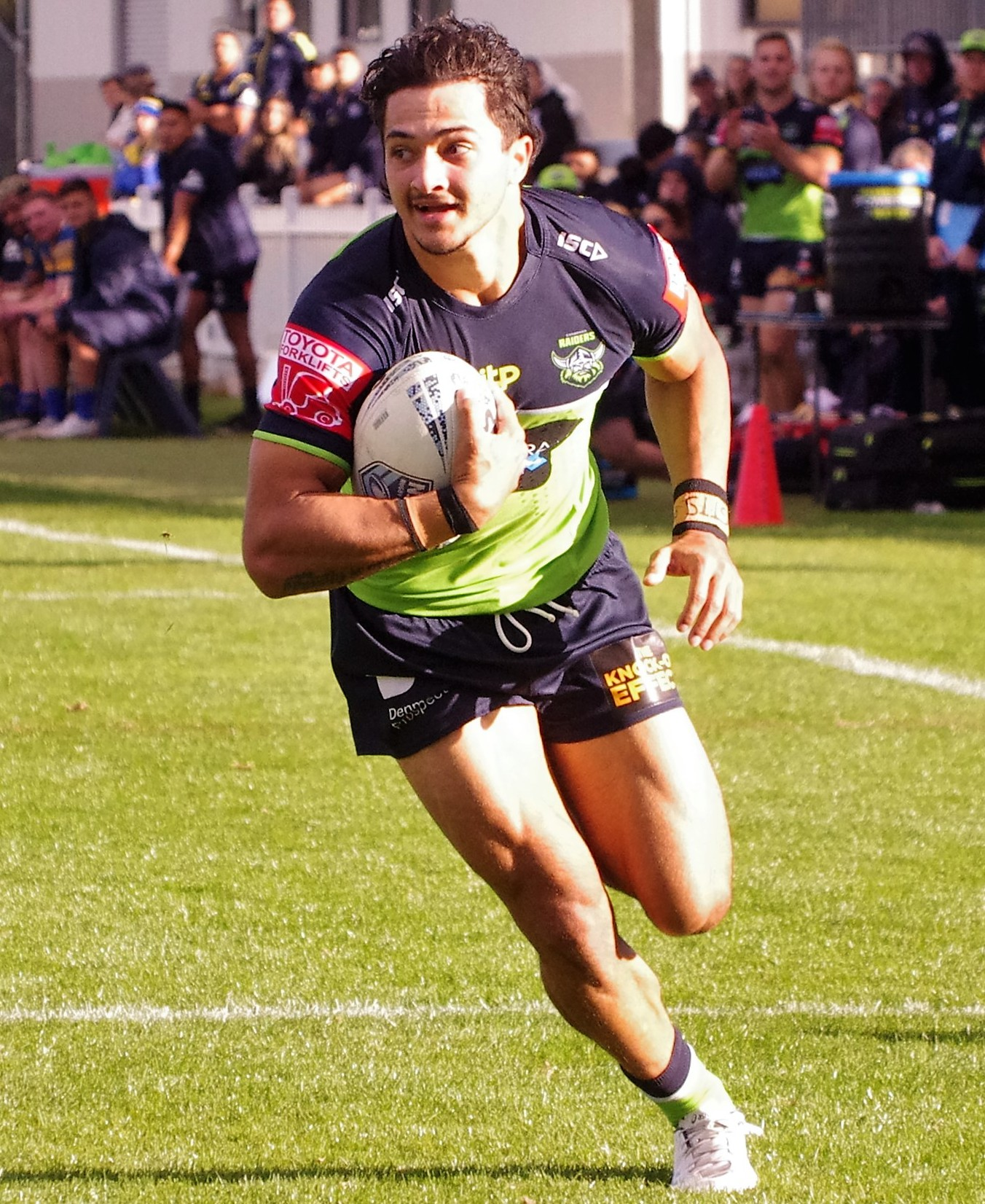

Personal information
- Born: 24 April 2002 (age 24) Cairns, Queensland, Australia
- Height: 185 cm (6 ft 1 in)
- Weight: 95 kg (14 st 13 lb)

Playing information
- Position: Wing, Fullback
Club
Years	Team	Pld	T	G	FG	P
2021–	Canberra Raiders	86	49	0	0	196
Representative
Years	Team	Pld	T	G	FG	P
2024	Prime Minister's XIII	1	0	0	0	0
- Source: As of 5 September 2026

Xavier Hershel Savage (born 24 April 2002) is an Indigenous Australian professional rugby league footballer who plays as a winger or fullback for the Canberra Raiders in the National Rugby League.

== Background ==
Savage was born in Cairns, Queensland, Australia. He attended Brisbane Boys College and grew up playing rugby union. He is an Indigenous Australian (from Birri Gubba and Gungganyji people) and a Torres Strait Islander (from Erub Island).

== Playing career ==
=== 2021 ===
In round 15 of the 2021 NRL season, Savage made his first grade debut for the Canberra Raiders against the St. George Illawarra Dragons. He entered the game as a concussion replacement (18th man) for Sebastian Kris, playing 12 minutes after half-time until officials realized that Jack Bird had not been sin-binned or sent off for his tackle on Kris, a requirement for using the 18th man. On 20 July 2021, it was announced that Savage would miss the remainder of the 2021 NRL season after suffering an AC shoulder joint injury in Canberra's win over Cronulla-Sutherland.

=== 2022 ===
Savage played a total of 19 games for Canberra in the 2022 NRL season as the club finished 8th on the table and qualified for the finals. Savage played in both finals matches as Canberra were eliminated in the second week by Parramatta.

=== 2023 ===
On 15 March, it was announced that Savage would be ruled out for over 4 weeks with a broken jaw. Savage played only one match for Canberra in the 2023 NRL season.

=== 2024 ===
Savage played 24 games for Canberra in the 2024 NRL season and scored 15 tries as the club finished 9th on the table. On 13 December, the Raiders announced that Savage had re-signed with the club until the end of 2027.

=== 2025 ===
In round 11, Savage scored a hat-trick in Canberra's 40-24 victory over the Gold Coast. Savage played 21 matches for Canberra in the 2025 NRL season as the club claimed the Minor Premiership.

=== 2026 ===
Savage played 19 games for Canberra in the 2026 NRL season and scored 13 tries as the club finished 11th on the table and missed the finals.

== Statistics ==
Year	Team	Games	Tries	Pts
2021	Canberra Raiders	3	1	4
2022	Canberra Raiders	19	7	28
2023	Canberra Raiders	1	1	4
2024	Canberra Raiders	24	15	60
2025	Canberra Raiders	21	12	48
2026	Canberra Raiders	17	10	40
	Totals	86	46	184
