= Zac Hosking =

Australian rugby league footballer

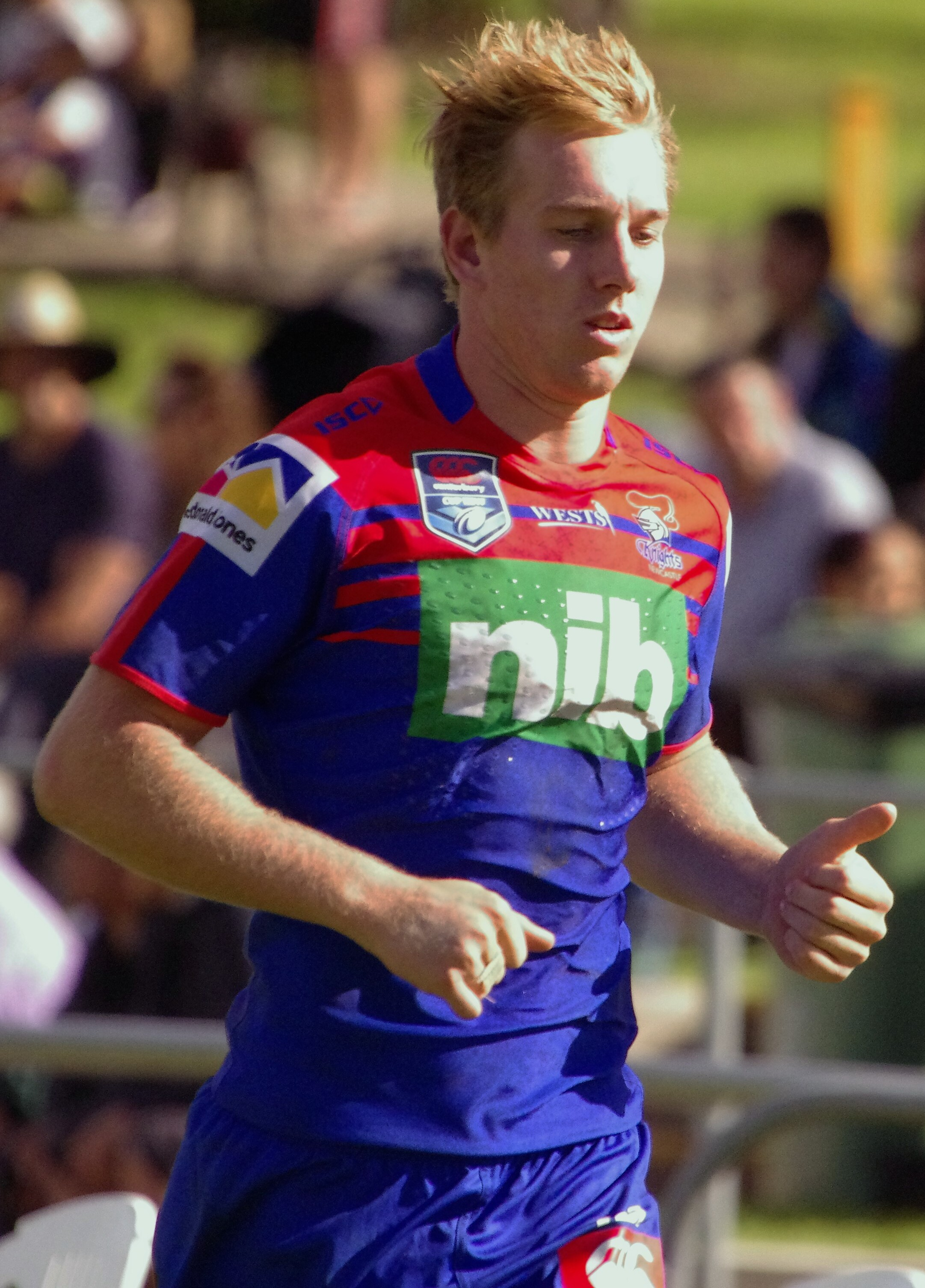

Personal information
- Full name: Zac Hosking
- Born: 26 February 1997 (age 29) Manly, New South Wales, Australia
- Height: 189 cm (6 ft 2 in)
- Weight: 98 kg (15 st 6 lb)

Playing information
- Position: Second-row
Club
Years	Team	Pld	T	G	FG	P
2022	Brisbane Broncos	4	0	0	0	0
2023	Penrith Panthers	21	3	0	0	12
2024–	Canberra Raiders	50	13	0	0	52
	Total	75	16	0	0	64
- Source: As of 21 August 2026
- Father: David Hosking

Zac Hosking (born 26 February 1997) is an Australian professional rugby league footballer who plays as a second-row forward for the Canberra Raiders in the National Rugby League.

He is the son of former NRL player David Hosking.

He previously played for the Brisbane Broncos and Penrith Panthers in the NRL.

== Background ==
Hosking played his junior rugby league for the Central Charlestown Butcher Boys.

== Playing career ==
=== 2022 ===
Hosking made his first grade debut for Brisbane against St. George Illawarra in round 17 of the 2022 NRL season.

=== 2023 ===
On 18 February, Hosking played in Penrith's 13–12 upset loss to St Helens RFC in the 2023 World Club Challenge. Hosking played 21 games for Penrith in the 2023 NRL season. He played in Penrith's qualifying final victory over the New Zealand Warriors but did not play in the 2023 NRL Grand Final in which Penrith defeated Brisbane.

=== 2024 ===
On 10 January, Hosking was granted an immediate release from Penrith to join the Canberra Raiders on a three-year deal. In round 1 of the 2024 NRL season, Hosking made his club debut for Canberra and scored a try in their 28–12 victory over Newcastle. On 18 April, it was announced that Hosking would be ruled out indefinitely with a shoulder injury.

=== 2025 ===
On 17 July, the capital club announced that Hosking had re-signed with the club until the end of 2028. Hosking played 21 matches for Canberra in the 2025 NRL season as the club claimed the Minor Premiership. Hosking played in both finals matches as Canberra went out in straight sets losing to both Brisbane and Cronulla.

=== 2026 ===
Hosking played 21 matches for Canberra in the 2026 NRL season as the club finished 11th on the table and missed the finals.

== Statistics ==
Year	Team	Games	Tries	Pts
2022	Brisbane Broncos	4		
2023	Penrith Panthers	21	3	12
2024	Canberra Raiders	8	2	8
2025	Canberra Raiders	21	5	20
2026	Canberra Raiders	21	6	24
2027	Canberra Raiders			
	Totals	75	16	64
