= Matty Nicholson =

England international rugby league footballer (born 2003)

Personal information
- Full name: Matthew Nicholson
- Born: 18 July 2003 (age 23) Halifax, West Yorkshire, England
- Height: 185 cm (6 ft 1 in)
- Weight: 100 kg (15 st 10 lb)

Playing information
- Position: Second-row
Club
Years	Team	Pld	T	G	FG	P
2021–22	Wigan Warriors	1	2	0	0	8
2021(loan)	→ Newcastle Thunder	1	0	0	0	0
2022(loan)	→ Newcastle Thunder	9	1	0	0	4
2022–24	Warrington Wolves	50	17	0	0	68
2025–	Canberra Raiders	16	6	0	0	24
	Total	77	26	0	0	104
Representative
Years	Team	Pld	T	G	FG	P
2022–	England Knights	1	0	0	0	0
2023–	England	2	1	0	0	4
- Source: As of 5 September 2026

Matthew Nicholson (born 18 July 2003) is an English professional rugby league footballer who plays as a second-row forward for the Canberra Raiders in the National Rugby League.

== Background ==
Born on 18 July 2003, in Halifax, West Yorkshire, Nicholson played his amateur rugby league for Siddal.

== Playing career ==
=== Wigan ===
Nicholson started his professional career at Wigan Warriors. He made his senior debut in 2021 on loan at Newcastle Thunder, and was loaned out again to the club at the start of the 2022 season. In May 2022, Nicholson made his Super League debut for Wigan, scoring two tries in a 22–32 defeat against Huddersfield Giants.

=== Warrington ===
In June 2022, Warrington Wolves announced the signing of Nicholson on a three-and-a-half-year contract. Nicholson played 18 games for Warrington in the 2023 Super League season as Warrington finished sixth on the table and qualified for the playoffs. He played in the clubs elimination playoff loss against St Helens. On 8 June 2024, Nicholson played in Warrington's 2024 Challenge Cup final loss against Wigan.

=== Canberra Raiders ===
On 12 July 2024, it was reported that he had signed for Canberra in the NRL on a three-year deal. In round 2 of the 2025 NRL season, Nicholson made his club debut for Canberra and scored two tries as they defeated Brisbane 32-22. Nicholson played 11 matches for Canberra in the 2025 NRL season as the club claimed the Minor Premiership. Nicholson was limited to just five appearances for Canberra in the 2026 NRL season as the club finished 11th on the table and missed the finals.
