= Jed Stuart =

Australian Rugby league footballer

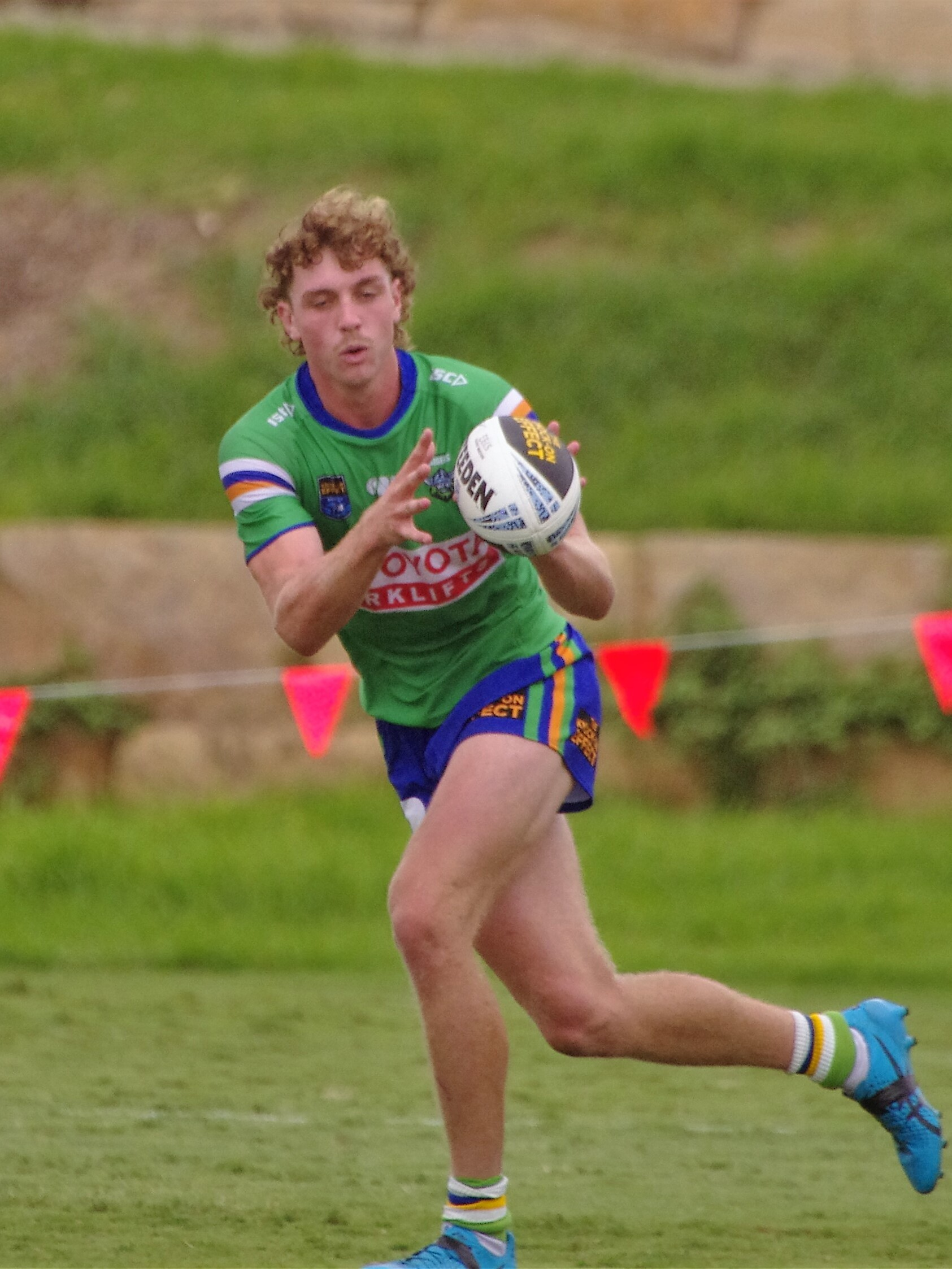

Personal information
- Full name: Jed Stuart
- Born: 22 June 2001 (age 25) Sydney, New South Wales, Australia
- Height: 193 cm (6 ft 4 in)
- Weight: 97 kg (15 st 4 lb)

Playing information
- Position: Wing
Club
Years	Team	Pld	T	G	FG	P
2025–	Canberra Raiders	28	11	0	0	44
- Father: Ricky Stuart

Jed Stuart (born 22 June 2001 in Sydney) is an Australian professional rugby league footballer who plays as a winger for the Canberra Raiders in the National Rugby League.

== Personal life ==
Stuart is the son of Ricky Stuart.

== Junior career ==
Stuart's junior club was Woden Valley Rams.

== Playing career ==
In 2021, Stuart was a part of the Australian Rugby 7s squad that went to Dubai for matches.

Stuart made his first grade debut in Canberra's Round 16 match of the 2025 NRL season, he scored a try on debut. Stuart played in Canberra's 40–16 win against Parramatta scoring two tries. Stuart played in round 26 where Canberra would defeat the Wests Tigers 24-10 and he scored in the match, and would claim the club's second minor premiership. He played in both finals matches as Canberra went out in straight sets losing to both Brisbane and Cronulla. Stuart played 17 games for Canberra in the 2026 NRL season as the club finished 11th on the table and missed the finals.

=== 2026 ===
On 24 September, the Raiders announced that Stuart had re-signed with the club until the end of 2029.

== Statistics ==
Year	Team	Games	Tries	Pts
2025	Canberra Raiders	11	5	20
2026	Canberra Raiders	17	6	24
	Totals	28	11	44
