= Michael Asomua =

New Zealand rugby league player

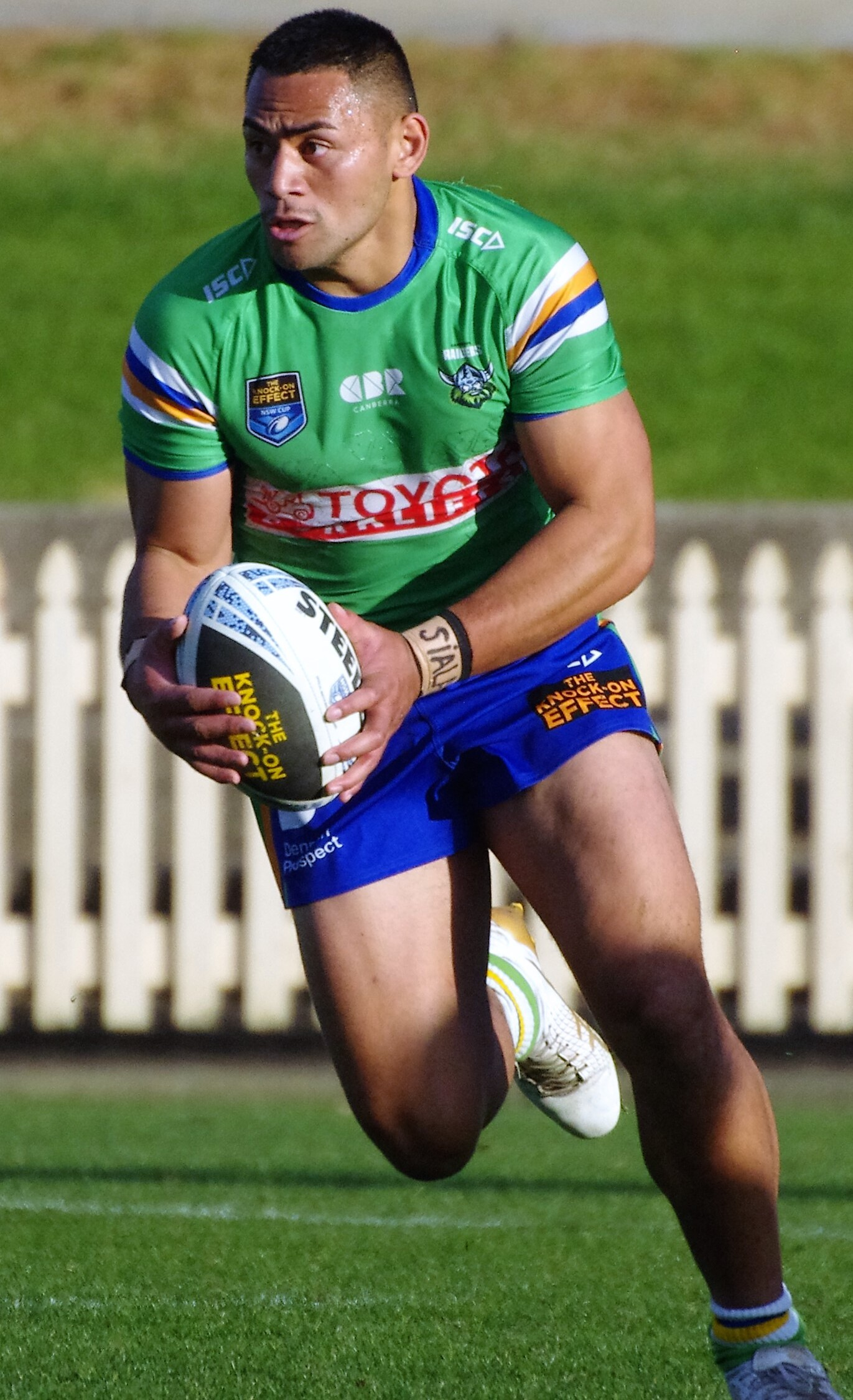

Personal information
- Full name: Utuloa Asomua
- Born: 7 May 2003 (age 23) Hastings, New Zealand
- Height: 175 cm (5 ft 9 in)
- Weight: 94 kg (14 st 11 lb)

Playing information
- Position: Wing
Club
Years	Team	Pld	T	G	FG	P
2025–26	Canberra Raiders	1	1	0	0	4
- Source: As of 2 October 2026

Michael Asomua (born 7 May 2003) is a New Zealand professional rugby league footballer who last played as a winger for the Canberra Raiders in the National Rugby League (NRL).

== Background ==
Asomua played his junior rugby league for the Yenda Blueheelers in the Group 20competition and laterattended Erindale College in Canberra before joining the Raiders in the SG Ball squad, and being selected for the City Origin and Australian Schoolboy squads in 2021. In 2022, Asomua was selected for the NSW U19's Origin squad.

== Career ==
Asomua re-signed with the Canberra Raiders until the end of 2026. In round 27 of the 2025 NRL season, Asomua made his NRL debut for the Canberra Raiders against the Dolphins, at Kayo Stadium in Redcliffe. He scored a try in a 62–24 loss. On 25 August 2026, it was announced that he would be departing the Canberra club after not being offered a new contract.
