= Trey Mooney =

Australian rugby league footballer

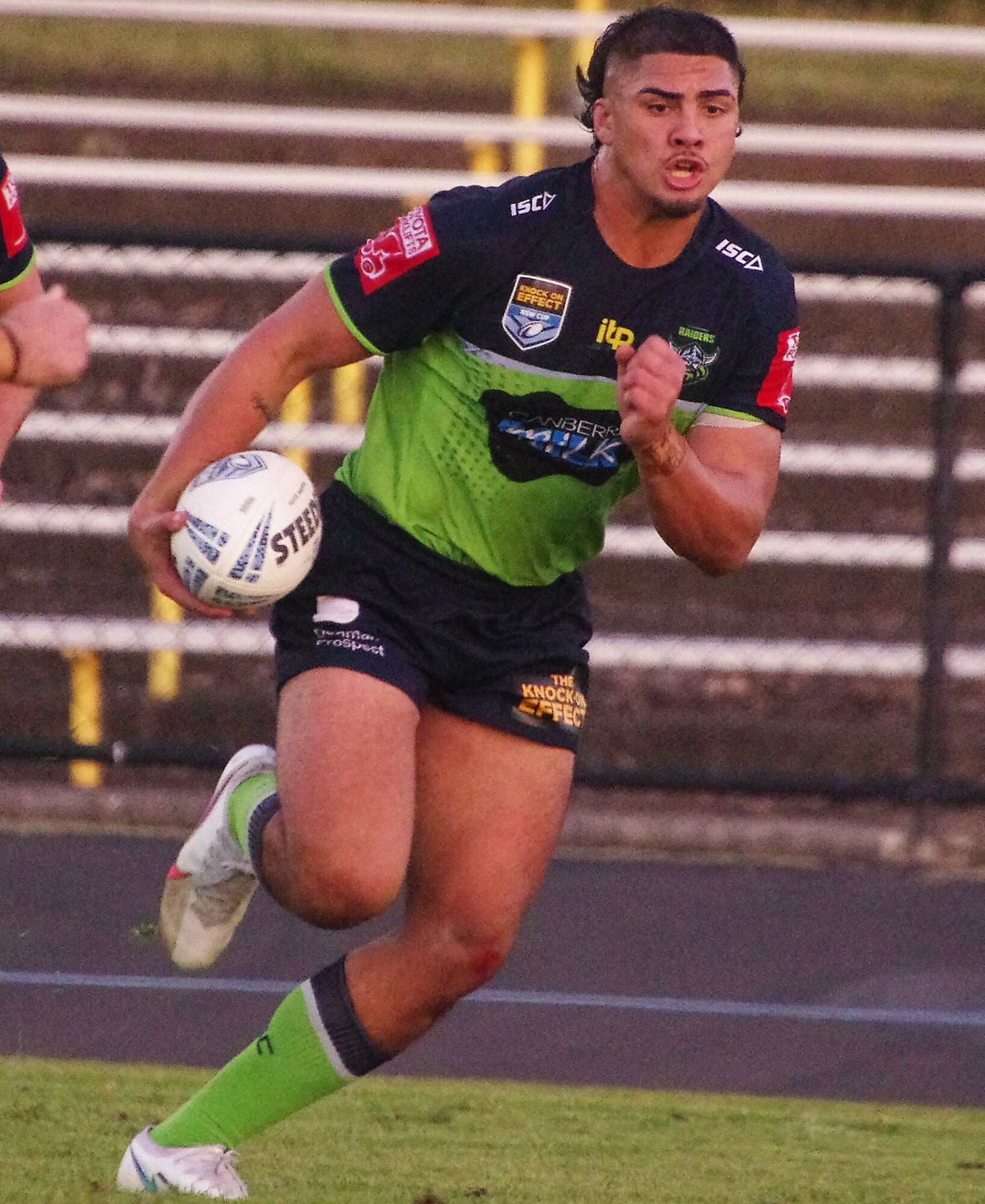

Personal information
- Born: 4 May 2002 (age 24) Sydney, New South Wales, Australia
- Height: 188 cm (6 ft 2 in)
- Weight: 106 kg (16 st 10 lb)

Playing information
- Position: Prop, Lock
Club
Years	Team	Pld	T	G	FG	P
2022–25	Canberra Raiders	25	2	0	0	8
2026–	Newcastle Knights	22	5	0	0	20
	Total	47	7	0	0	28
Representative
Years	Team	Pld	T	G	FG	P
2024–25	Māori All Stars	2	0	0	0	0
- Source: As of 30 August 2026

Trey Mooney (born 4 May 2002) is an Australian rugby league footballer who plays as a prop forward for the Newcastle Knights in the National Rugby League (NRL).

He has previously played for the Canberra Raiders.

== Background ==
Mooney was born in Sydney, New South Wales, Australia and is of Croatian and Maori heritage.

He was a Cabramatta Two Blues junior. Mooney would then join the Parramatta Eels playing in their junior system. Mooney would also represent the Australian Schoolboys and the junior New South Wales representative teams.

== Playing career ==
Mooney made his first grade debut in round 13 of the 2022 NRL season in his side's 22−16 victory over the Sydney Roosters at Canberra Stadium. Mooney was limited to only four matches with Canberra in the 2023 NRL season as the club finished 8th on the table and qualified for the finals. Mooney was called into Canberra's side for their elimination final match against Newcastle. Mooney scored a try in the game but Canberra would go on to lose in golden point extra-time 30-28. Mooney played 16 matches for Canberra in the 2024 NRL season as the club finished 9th on the table.

=== 2025 ===
On 29 July 2025, it was announced that Mooney had been told by the Canberra club that he could negotiate with other teams ahead of the 2026 NRL season. On 10 September, the Newcastle club announced that Mooney had signed with them on a four-year deal.

=== 2026 ===
Mooney played 22 matches for Newcastle in the 2026 NRL season. He did not feature in the clubs finals campaign.

== Statistics ==
Year	Team	Games	Tries	Pts
2022	Canberra Raiders	1		
2023	Canberra Raiders	4	1	4
2024	Canberra Raiders	16	1	4
2025	Canberra Raiders	4		
2026	Newcastle Knights	22	5	20
	Totals	47	7	28
