= Sebastian Kris =

New Zealand international rugby league footballer

Seb Kris
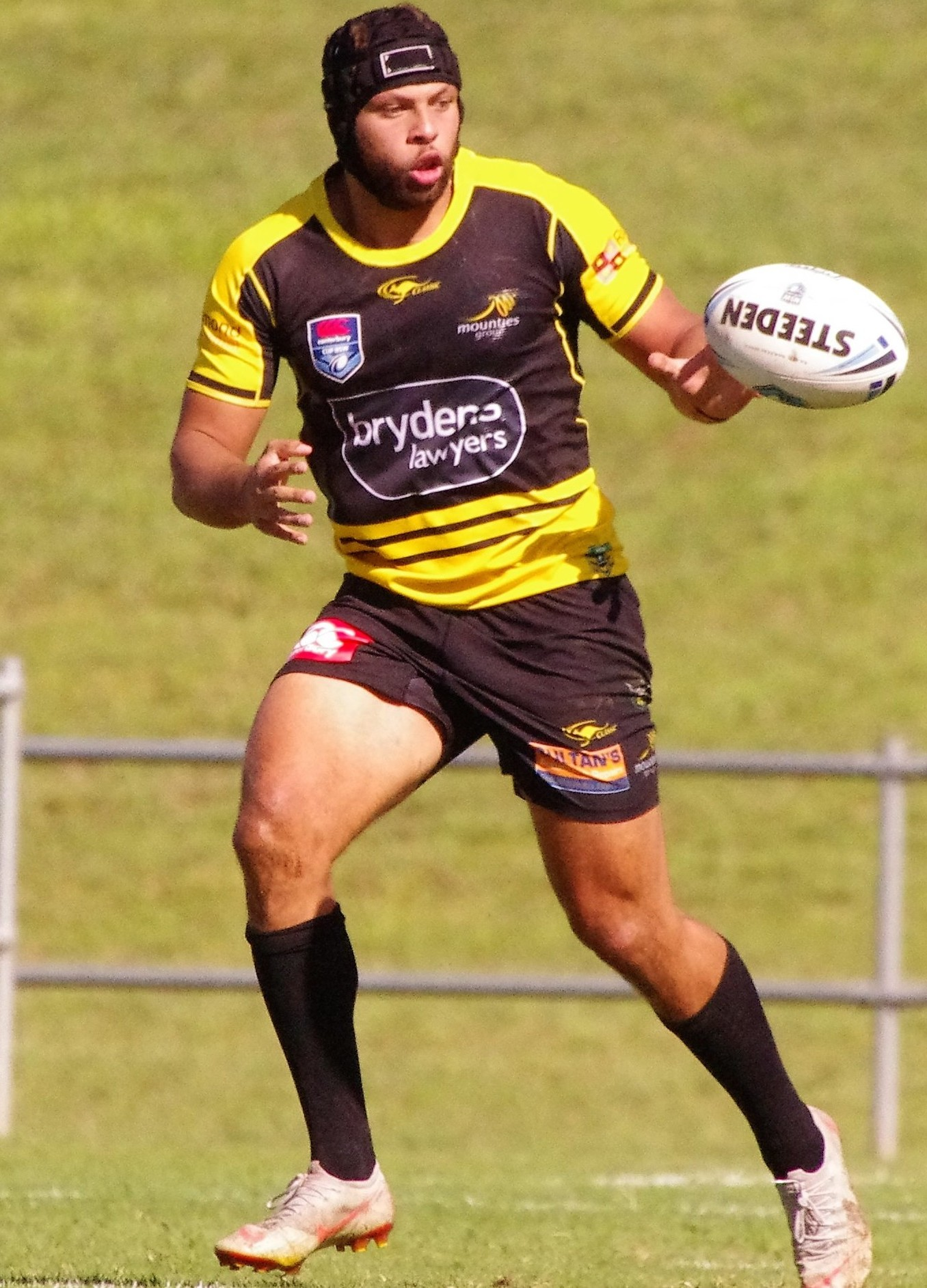

Personal information
- Full name: Sebastian Kris
- Born: 19 April 1999 (age 27) Brisbane, Queensland, Australia
- Height: 182 cm (6 ft 0 in)
- Weight: 99 kg (15 st 8 lb)

Playing information
- Position: Centre, Wing, Fullback
Club
Years	Team	Pld	T	G	FG	P
2019–	Canberra Raiders	124	50	0	0	200
Representative
Years	Team	Pld	T	G	FG	P
2022	New Zealand	1	1	0	0	4
- Source: As of 1 August 2026

Sebastian Kris (born 19 April 1999) is a New Zealand international rugby league footballer who plays as a centre for the Canberra Raiders in the National Rugby League.

Kris represented New Zealand in the 2022 Rugby League World Cup as a winger. He has also played as a fullback in his career.

== Background ==
Kris was born in Brisbane, Queensland and is of Indigenous Australian, and Maori descent. His family is from the Torres Strait's. Kris played his first junior rugby league for the Wests Panthers.

He moved to Canberra at the age of eight and played his junior rugby league for the Tuggeranong Valley Dragons.

== Playing career ==
=== 2019 ===
Kris made his first grade debut in Round 10 of the 2019 NRL season for Canberra against South Sydney at Canberra Stadium.

=== 2020 ===
Kris spent the entirety of the 2020 NRL season away from Canberra, leading to him not being re-signed. Kris was later re-signed by the Canberra club for the 2021 NRL season and played in their Round 1 clash against the Wests Tigers.

=== 2021 ===
Kris played a total of 20 games for Canberra in the 2021 season as they finished 10th on the table.

=== 2022 ===
In round 23 of the 2022 NRL season, Kris scored two tries for Canberra in a 28–22 victory over Newcastle. Kris played a total of 20 games for Canberra in the 2022 NRL season and scored 14 tries as the club finished 8th on the table and qualified for the finals. Kris played in both finals matches as Canberra were eliminated in the second week by Parramatta.

=== 2023 ===
In the final round of the 2023 NRL season, Kris was sent off for a spear tackle on Cronulla's Sione Katoa. Canberra would go on to lose the match 24–6. The following day, Kris was suspended for five games. Kris played a total of 21 matches for Canberra in the 2023 NRL season as the club finished 8th on the table and qualified for the finals.

=== 2024 ===
Kris played 21 games for Canberra in the 2024 NRL season as the club finished 9th on the table.

=== 2025 ===
In round 1 of the 2025 NRL season, Kris scored two tries in Canberra's 30–8 victory over the New Zealand Warriors. Kris played 21 matches for Canberra in the 2025 NRL season as the club claimed the Minor Premiership. Kris played in both finals matches as Canberra went out in straight sets losing to both Brisbane and Cronulla.

=== 2026 ===
Kris featured in 15 matches for Canberra in the 2026 NRL season as the club finished 11th on the table and missed the finals.

== Statistics ==
Year	Team	Games	Tries	Pts
2019	Canberra Raiders	4	3	12
2021	Canberra Raiders	20	8	32
2022	Canberra Raiders	20	14	56
2023	Canberra Raiders	21	7	28
2024	Canberra Raiders	21	5	20
2025	Canberra Raiders	24	9	36
2026	Canberra Raiders			
Totals		109	46	184

*denotes season competing
