= 2023 Canberra Raiders season =

NRL rugby league season

- NRL Rank: 8th out of 17
- 2023 record: Wins: 13; draws: 0; losses: 11
- Points scored: For: 486; against: 623

Team information
- CEO: Don Furner Jr
- Head Coach: Ricky Stuart
- Captain: Jarrod Croker Elliot Whitehead
- Stadium: GIO Satdium - 25,000; McDonalds Park Wagga - 10,000 (Rd 9)
- Avg. attendance: 15,300
- High attendance: 21,082 (Rd 15 vs. Warriors)

Top scorers
- Tries: Jordan Rapana; Matthew Timoko (11)
- Goals: Jarrod Croker (59)
- Points: Jarrod Croker (132)
← 2022	List of seasons	2024 →

The 2023 Canberra Raiders season is the 42nd in the club's history. They will compete in the National Rugby League's 2023 Telstra Premiership. The Co-captain Jarrod Croker retains his club role for the 10th consecutive season and other Co-captain Elliot Whitehead retains his co-captaincy for his 5th consecutive season. While Head Coach Ricky Stuart maintains his club position for the 10th consecutive season.

== Player movement ==
These movements happened across the previous season, off-season and pre-season.

=== Gains ===
Player/Coach	Previous club	Length
Pasami Saulo	Newcastle Knights	2024
Danny Levi	Huddersfield Giants	2024

=== Losses ===
Player/Coach	New Club
Josh Hodgson	Parramatta Eels
Adam Elliott	Newcastle Knights
Charnze Nicoll-Klokstad	New Zealand Warriors
Ryan Sutton	Canterbury-Bankstown Bulldogs

== Pre-Season Challenge ==
Date	Round	Opponent	Venue	Score	Tries	Goals	Attendance
Sunday, 12 February	Trial 1	Canterbury-Bankstown Bulldogs	Ack Weyman Oval	18 – 34	Brad Schneider 23'; Elijah Anderson 48'; James Schiller 55'; Mitchell Spencer 65'	Jarrod Croker (1/4)	4,535
Sunday, 19 February	Trial 2	Wests Tigers	Belmore Sports Ground	36 – 4	Danny Levi 20'	Jamal Fogarty (0/1)	7,800

== Regular season ==
=== Ladder ===
2023 NRL season
Pos	Team	Pld	W	D	L	B	PF	PA	PD	Pts
1	Penrith Panthers (P)	24	18	0	6	3	645	312	+333	42
2	Brisbane Broncos	24	18	0	6	3	639	425	+214	42
3	Melbourne Storm	24	16	0	8	3	627	459	+168	38
4	New Zealand Warriors	24	16	0	8	3	572	448	+124	38
5	Newcastle Knights	24	14	1	9	3	626	451	+175	35
6	Cronulla-Sutherland Sharks	24	14	0	10	3	619	497	+122	34
7	Sydney Roosters	24	13	0	11	3	472	496	−24	32
8	Canberra Raiders	24	13	0	11	3	486	623	−137	32
9	South Sydney Rabbitohs	24	12	0	12	3	564	505	+59	30
10	Parramatta Eels	24	12	0	12	3	587	574	+13	30
11	North Queensland Cowboys	24	12	0	12	3	546	542	+4	30
12	Manly Warringah Sea Eagles	24	11	1	12	3	545	539	+6	29
13	Dolphins	24	9	0	15	3	520	631	−111	24
14	Gold Coast Titans	24	9	0	15	3	527	653	−126	24
15	Canterbury-Bankstown Bulldogs	24	7	0	17	3	438	769	−331	20
16	St. George Illawarra Dragons	24	5	0	19	3	474	673	−199	16
17	Wests Tigers	24	4	0	20	3	385	675	−290	14

=== Matches ===
Date	Round	Opponent	Venue	Score	Tries	Goals	Attendance
Saturday, 4 March	1	North Queensland Cowboys	Queensland Country Bank Stadium	19 - 18	Emre Guler 37'; Tom Starling 53'; Jack Wighton 57'	Jamal Fogarty (3/3)	19,855
Saturday, 11 March	2	Dolphins	Kayo Stadium	20 - 14	Jack Wighton 13' Nick Cotric 28'	Jamal Fogarty (1/2); PG:Jamal Fogarty (2/2)	10,023
Sunday, 19 March	3	Cronulla-Sutherland Sharks	GIO Stadium	24 - 20	Albert Hopoate 15'; Matt Timoko 43'; Corey Horsburgh (2) 30' 51'	Jamal Fogarty (4/4)	14,134
Sunday, 26 March	4	Newcastle Knights	McDonald Jones Stadium	24 - 14	Hudson Young 3' Jack Wighton 23'	Corey Harawira-Naera (2/2) 2P FG:Matt Frawley	15,106
Friday, 31 March	5	Penrith Panthers	GIO Stadium	53 - 12	Elliott Whitehead 31' Hudson Young 56'	Jamal Fogarty (2/2)	15,334
Saturday, 8 April	6	Brisbane Broncos	Lang Park	20 - 14	Jordan Rapana (2) 4' 29' Albert Hopoate 50'	Jarrod Croker (3/3) PG: Jarrod Croker (1/1)	31,962
Sunday, 16 April	7	St. George Illawarra Dragons	GIO Stadium	20 - 14	Sebastian Kris 45' Matthew Timoko 62'; Hudson Young 72'	Jarrod Croker (3/3) PG: Jarrod Croker (1/1)	13,817
	8	BYE					
Saturday, 29 April	9	Dolphins	McDonald's Park	31 - 30	Jarrod Croker 1' Jack Wighton 5'; Jordan Rapana 20'; Sebastian Kris 35'; Jamal Fogarty 66'	Jarrod Croker (3/5) PG: Jarrod Croker (2/2); 1P FG: Jamal Fogarty	10,445
Friday, 5 May	10	Canterbury-Bankstown Bulldogs	Lang Park	34 -30	Jordan Rapana (2) 1' 44' Xavier Savage 16'; Matthew Timoko 19'; Hudson Young 22'; Jarrod Croker 57'	Jarrod Croker (4/6) PG: Jarrod Croker (1/1)	41,462
Saturday, 13 May	11	Parramatta Eels	GIO Stadium	26 - 18	Albert Hopoate 36' Hudson Young 42'; Sebastian Kris 45'; Matthew Timoko 74'	Jarrod Croker (3/4) PG: Jarrod Croker (2/2)	17,414
Sunday, 21 May	12	Manly Warringah Sea Eagles	GIO Stadium	42 - 14	Elliott Whitehead 5' Ata Mariota 68'	Jarrod Croker (2/2) PG: Jarrod Croker (1/1)	14,730
Saturday, 27 May	13	South Sydney Rabbitohs	Accor Stadium	33 - 26	Corey Horsburgh 13' Albert Hopoate (3) 17' 22' 73'; Tom Starling 58'	Jarrod Croker (4/5) PG: Jarrod Croker (2/2); 1P FG: Jamal Fogarty	12,382
Friday, 2 June	14	Wests Tigers	Campbelltown Sports Stadium	20 - 19	Jamal Fogarty (2) 6' 48' Jordan Rapana 32'	Jamal Fogarty (3/3); PG:Jamal Fogarty (1/1)	11,201
Friday, 9 June	15	New Zealand Warriors	GIO Stadium	36 - 14	Jack Wighton 21' Josh Papali'i 77'	Jarrod Croker (2/2) PG: Jarrod Croker (1/1)	21,082
	16	BYE					
Sunday, 25 June	17	Sydney Roosters	Allianz Stadium	20 - 18	Jack Wighton 16' Albert Hopoate 21'; Matthew Timoko 28'	Jarrod Croker (2/3) PG: Jarrod Croker (2/2)	13,326
Saturday, 1 July	18	Gold Coast Titans	GIO Stadium	26 - 22	Albert Hopoate 1' Sebastian Kris 16'; Matthew Timoko 49'; Hudson Young 73'	Jarrod Croker (4/4) PG: Jarrod Croker (1/1)	11,659
Friday, 7 July	19	St. George Illawarra Dragons	WIN Stadium	36 - 26	Jordan Rapana 8' Joseph Tapine 16'; Matthew Timoko (2) 25' 48'; Matt Frawley 39'; Sebastian Kris 71'	Jarrod Croker (6/6)	9,319
	20	BYE					
Friday, 21 July	21	New Zealand Warriors	Mt Smart Stadium	21 - 20	Hudson Young 18' Jordan Rapana 63'; Elliott Whitehead 78'; Jack Wighton 79'	Jarrod Croker (2/4)	19,112
Saturday, 29 July	22	Newcastle Knights	GIO Stadium	28 - 6	Jordan Rapana 51'	Jarrod Croker (1/1)	15,487
Sunday, 6 August	23	Wests Tigers	GIO Stadium	22 - 18	Sebastian Kris (2) 25' 44' Hudson Young 28'; Matthew Timoko 63'	Jamal Fogarty (3/4)	12,841
Sunday, 13 August	24	Melbourne Storm	AAMI Park	48 - 2		PG: Jamal Fogarty (1/1)	17,369
Sunday, 20 August	25	Canterbury-Bankstown Bulldogs	GIO Stadium	36 - 24	Matthew Timoko (2) 11' 49' Jarrod Croker 31'; Nick Cotric 60'; Jordan Rapana 67'; Josh Papali'i 72'	Jarrod Croker (6/6)	12,402
Saturday, 26 August	26	Brisbane Broncos	GIO Stadium	29 - 18	Matt Frawley 17' Nick Cotric 31'; Hudson Young 37'	Jamal Fogarty (2/3); PG:Jamal Fogarty (1/1)	19,400
Sunday, 3 September	27	Cronulla-Sutherland Sharks	PointsBet Stadium	24 - 6	Jordan Rapana 4'	Jamal Fogarty (1/1)	12,750
Sunday, 10 September	Elimination Finals	Newcastle Knights	McDonald Jones Stadium	30 - 28	James Schiller (2) 18' 39' Trey Mooney 31'; Matt Frawley 64'; Tom Starling 77'	Jamal Fogarty (4/5)	29,548

== 2023 squad ==
Canberra Raiders 2023 squad
Top 30 squad - 2023 NRL season		Development list	Coaching staff
Nick Cotric – WG; Jarrod Croker (c) – CE; Jamal Fogarty – HB; Matt Frawley – FE, HB; Emre Guler – PR; Corey Harawira-Naera – LK, SR; Peter Hola – PR; Albert Hopoate – WG; Corey Horsburgh – LK, SR; Sebastian Kris – FB, CE, WG; Danny Levi – HK; Ata Mariota – PR; Trey Mooney – PR	Jordan Rapana – WG, FB; Pasami Saulo – PR; Xavier Savage – WG; James Schiller – WG; Harley Smith-Shields – CE; Tom Starling – HK; Joseph Tapine – PR, LK; Matthew Timoko – CE; Adrian Trevilyan – HK; Clay Webb – SR; Elliott Whitehead (c) – SR; Jack Wighton – FE, CE; Zac Woolford – HK	Michael Asomua – WG; Jayden Clarkson – PR; Brad Morkos – CE; Ethan Strange – CE; Extended Squad: Hohepa Puru – LK	Head coach: Ricky Stuart; Assistant coaches: Mick Crawley; Michael Maguire (Senior NRL Consultant); Justin Giteau (NSW Cup Coach); Ash Barnes (Jersey Flegg Coach); Chris Hitchison (Elite Pathways Coach); Josh Miller (Contact Coach); Medical professionals: Greg MacLeod (Club Doctor); Travis Ronaldson (NRL Strength & Power Coach/Club Dietitian); Leigh Woodbridge (NRL Rehabilitation Coach); Tom Christian (NRL Sports Scientist); Konrad Schultz (Head Physiotherapist); Isaac Priddis (Physiotherapist); Managers: Josh Strahorn (NRL High Performance Manager); Joel Carbone (NRL Recruitment Manager); Dean Souter (Pathways & Performance); Dave Warwick (Elite Recruitment); Legend: (c) Captain(s); (vc) Vice-captain(s); Updated: 26 March 2024; Source(s): Raiders 2023 Squad Tracker, Raiders - Staff

=== Year End Player Movement ===
The following players departed the Canberra Raiders following the 2023 NRL Season.

Player	New Club
Jarrod Croker	Retirement
Matt Frawley	Leeds Rhinos
Harley Smith-Shields	Gold Coast Titans
Jack Wighton	South Sydney Rabbitohs

== Player Milestones ==
Round	Player	Milestone
Round 1	Danny Levi	Club debut
Round 1	Pasami Saulo	Club debut
Round 6	Peter Hola	Club debut
Round 15	Jarrod Croker	300th game
Round 24	Ethan Strange	NRL debut
Round 27	Hohepa Puru	NRL debut
Finals 1	Jordan Rapana	200th NRL game

== Statistics ==
Name	Appearances	Tries	Goals	Field goals	Points
Nick Cotric	13	3	0	0	12
Jarrod Croker	15	3	59	0	130
Jamal Fogarty	24	3	28	2	70
Matt Frawley	8	3	0	1 (Note: 1x 2 point field goal)	14
Emre Guler	25	1	0	0	4
Corey Harawira-Naera	9	0	2	0	4
Peter Hola	2	0	0	0	0
Albert Hopoate	20	8	0	0	32
Corey Horsburgh	22	3	0	0	12
Sebastian Kris	21	7	0	0	28
Danny Levi	4	0	0	0	0
Ata Mariota	17	1	0	0	4
Trey Mooney	4	1	0	0	4
Josh Papali'i	18	2	0	0	8
Hohepa Puru	2	0	0	0	0
Jordan Rapana	21	11	0	0	44
Pasami Saulo	22	0	0	0	0
Xavier Savage	1	1	0	0	4
James Schiller	4	2	0	0	8
Brad Schneider	1	0	0	0	0
Harley Smith-Shields	6	0	0	0	0
Tom Starling	23	3	0	0	12
Ethan Strange	1	0	0	0	0
Joseph Tapine	24	1	0	0	4
Matthew Timoko	25	11	0	0	44
Adrian Trevilyan	2	0	0	0	0
Elliott Whitehead	23	3	0	0	12
Jack Wighton	22	7	0	0	28
Zac Woolford	21	0	0	0	0
Hudson Young	24	9	0	0	36
30 players used	—	83	89	2/1	514

== Representative honours ==
This table lists all players who have played a representative match in 2023.

Player	All Stars match	State of Origin 1	State of Origin 2	State of Origin 3	Prime Minister's XIII	Pacific Cup/Bowl	Tonga in England
Emre Guler					Australia		
Corey Harawira-Naera	Māori						
Corey Horsburgh				Queensland			
Jordan Rapana	Māori						
Joseph Tapine	Māori (c)					New Zealand	
Matthew Timoko						New Zealand	
Jack Wighton	Indigenous						
Elliott Whitehead							England
Hudson Young		New South Wales	New South Wales		Australia		
