= 2021 Canberra Raiders season =

- NRL rank: 10th
- 2021 record: Wins: 10; losses: 14
- Points scored: For: 481; against: 578

Team information
- CEO Chairman: Don Furner Jr. Allan Hawke
- Coach: Ricky Stuart
- Captain: Jarrod Croker & Elliott Whitehead
- Stadium: Canberra Stadium
- Avg. attendance: 10,538

Top scorers
- Goals: 38 - Jarrod Croker
- Points: 24 - Jordan Rapana
← 2020	List of seasons	2022 →

The 2021 Canberra Raiders season was the 41st in the club's history. Coached by Ricky Stuart and captained jointly by Jarrod Croker, Josh Hodgson (Note: Until his step-down from captaincy on May 5th.) and Elliott Whitehead, they competed in the 2021 NRL season, placing 10th out of 16 teams and thus failing to make the finals.

== Season summary ==
Canberra looked to capitalise on their successful 2020 campaign, however they fell apart mid-season from heavy losses to other teams such as the Penrith Panthers and South Sydney Rabbitohs, losing five games in a row and being demolished by underdogs the Gold Coast Titans. Rumours of a player-coach riff between Stuart and a certain number of players led to the stand-down of Josh Hodgson as captain and the departure of English import George Williams. Due to the COVID-19 pandemic, the NRL relocated to Queensland to play the rest of the season. This was further setback with the lockdown in Brisbane and 11 other LGAs in June. Multiple injuries to players such as youngster Xavier Savage and hooker Tom Starling threatened to derail their season, but they were successful in gaining wins in the second half of the year, with defeats of Manly, Cronulla and Parramatta successively. They came close to reaching the top eight, however a loss to the Roosters in Round 25 sealed their fate.

== Results ==
Round	Home	Score	Away	Match Information
Round	Home	Score	Away	Date and Time	Venue	Crowd
1	Canberra Raiders	30 - 12	Wests Tigers	Sun 14 Mar, 4:05pm AEDT	Canberra Stadium	15,680
2	Cronulla-Sutherland Sharks	10 - 12	Canberra Raiders	Sun 21 Mar, 6:15pm AEDT	Netstrata Jubilee Stadium	3,145
3	Canberra Raiders	31 - 34	New Zealand Warriors	Sat 27 Mar, 3:00pm AEDT	Canberra Stadium	13,456
4	Canberra Raiders	20 - 4	Gold Coast Titans	Sat 3 Mar, 7:45pm AEDT	Netstrata Jubilee Stadium	5,117
5	Penrith Panthers	30 - 10	Canberra Raiders	Fri 9 Apr, 7:55pm AEDT	Netstrata Jubilee Stadium	20,890
6	Canberra Raiders	10 - 35	Parramatta Eels	Sat 17 Apr, 7:35pm AEDT	Canberra Stadium	20,089
7	North Queensland Cowboys	26 - 24	Canberra Raiders	Sat 24 Apr, 7:35pm AEDT	Queensland Country Bank Stadium	13,791
8	Canberra Raiders	10 - 35	South Sydney Rabbitohs	Thu 29 Apr, 7:50pm AEDT	Canberra Stadium	14,260
9	Newcastle Knights	24 - 16	Canberra Raiders	Sat 8 May, 3:00pm AEDT	McDonald Jones Stadium	6,642
10	Canberra Raiders	20 - 18	Canterbury-Bankstown Bulldogs	Sat 15 May, 3:00pm AEDT	Suncorp Stadium	45,115
11	Canberra Raiders	10 - 34	Melbourne Storm	Sat 22 May, 7:35pm AEDT	Canberra Stadium	14,120
12	Sydney Roosters	44 - 16	Canberra Raiders	Sat 29 May, 7:35pm AEDT	Central Coast Stadium	10,113
13		BYE
14	Canberra Raiders	38 - 16	Brisbane Broncos	Sat 12 Jun, 7:35pm AEDT	Canberra Stadium	9,608
15	St. George Illawarra Dragons	22 - 20	Canberra Raiders	Sat 19 Jun, 5:30pm AEDT	WIN Stadium	9,239
16	Canberra Raiders	6 - 44	Gold Coast Titans	Sat 3 Jul, 5:30pm AEDT	Canberra Stadium	7,646
17	Manly-Warringah Sea Eagles	16 - 30	Canberra Raiders	Thu 8 Jul, 7:50pm AEDT	Brookvale Oval	0
18	Canberra Raiders	34 - 18	Cronulla-Sutherland Sharks	Sat 17 Jul, 5:30pm AEDT	CBUS Super Stadium	3,874
19	Canberra Raiders	12 - 10	Parramatta Eels	Thu 22 Jul, 7:50pm AEDT	CBUS Super Stadium	2,566
20	Canberra Raiders	24 - 34	Newcastle Knights	Sun 1 Aug, 1:50pm AEDT	Suncorp Stadium	0
21	Canberra Raiders	20 - 12	St. George-Illawarra Dragons	Fri 6 Aug, 6:00pm AEDT	CBUS Super Stadium	0
22	Canberra Raiders	16 - 26	Melbourne Storm	Thu 12 Aug, 7:50pm AEDT	Sunshine Coast Stadium	2,523
23	Canberra Raiders	18 - 19	Manly-Warringah Sea Eagles	Fri 20 Aug, 6:00pm AEDT	Suncorp Stadium	6,181
24	Canberra Raiders	28 - 16	New Zealand Warriors	Fri 27 Aug, 6:00pm AEDT	BB Print Stadium	4,079
25	Canberra Raiders	16 - 40	Sydney Roosters	Thu 2 Sept, 7:50pm AEDT	BB Print Stadium	3,473

== Ladder ==
Pos	Team	Pld	W	D	L	B	PF	PA	PD	Pts	
1	Melbourne Storm (M)	24	21	0	3	1	815	316	+499	44	Advance to finals series
2	Penrith Panthers (P)	24	21	0	3	1	676	286	+390	44	Advance to finals series
3	South Sydney Rabbitohs	24	20	0	4	1	775	453	+322	42	Advance to finals series
4	Manly-Warringah Sea Eagles	24	16	0	8	1	744	492	+252	34	Advance to finals series
5	Sydney Roosters	24	16	0	8	1	630	489	+141	34	Advance to finals series
6	Parramatta Eels	24	15	0	9	1	566	457	+109	32	Advance to finals series
7	Newcastle Knights	24	12	0	12	1	428	571	−143	26	Advance to finals series
8	Gold Coast Titans	24	10	0	14	1	580	583	−3	22	Advance to finals series
9	Cronulla-Sutherland Sharks	24	10	0	14	1	520	556	−36	22	
10	Canberra Raiders	24	10	0	14	1	481	578	−97	22	
11	St. George Illawarra Dragons	24	8	0	16	1	474	616	−142	18	
12	New Zealand Warriors	24	8	0	16	1	453	624	−171	18	
13	Wests Tigers	24	8	0	16	1	500	714	−214	18	
14	Brisbane Broncos	24	7	0	17	1	446	695	−249	16	
15	North Queensland Cowboys	24	7	0	17	1	460	748	−288	16	
16	Canterbury-Bankstown Bulldogs (W)	24	3	0	21	1	340	710	−370	8	

Updated to match(es) played on 5 September 2021. Source: 2021 NRL Ladder
(M) Minor premiers; (P) Premiers; (W) Wooden spoon

== 2021 Squad ==
Canberra Raiders 2021 Squad
Top 30 Squad - 2021 Season			Development Players	Coaching staff
Caleb Aekins – FB, CE; Jarrod Croker (c) – CE (gk); Matt Frawley – FE, HB; Emre Guler – PR; Corey Harawira-Naera – SR, LK; Siliva Havili – HK, LK; Josh Hodgson (vc) – HK; Corey Horsburgh – PR, SR, LK; Ryan James – PR; Sebastian Kris – CE	Dunamis Lui – PR; Trey Mooney – LK; Charnze Nicoll-Klokstad – FB; Josh Papalii – PR; Jordan Rapana – WG, CE, FB; Harry Rushton – SR; Xavier Savage – FB, WG; Bailey Simonsson – WG, FB; Harley Smith-Shields – CE; Iosia Soliola – PR, LK	Tom Starling – HK; Ryan Sutton – PR, LK; Joseph Tapine – LK, SR; Matthew Timoko – CE; Semi Valemei – WG; Elliott Whitehead (c) – SR; Jack Wighton – FE; Sam Williams (gk) – HB; Hudson Young – SR, LK	Ata Mariota – PR; Darby Medlyn – LK, PR; Clay Webb – SR; Extended squad: Elijah Anderson – WG, FB; Brad Schneider – HB, HK	Head coach: Ricky Stuart; Assistant coaches: Brett White (assistant coach); Andrew McFadden (assistant coach); Legend: (c) Captain(s); (vc) Vice-captain(s); (gk) Goal kicker(s); Updated: 23 August 2021; Source(s): Raiders Team Profiles

== Transfers ==
Losses:

Player	Signed from	Signed To	Notes
John Bateman	Canberra Raiders	Wigan Warriors	
Nick Cotric	Canberra Raiders	Canterbury-Bankstown Bulldogs	
Michael Oldfield	Canberra Raiders	Parramatta Eels	
Corey Horsburgh	Canberra Raiders	Canterbury-Bankstown Bulldogs (mid-season loan)	
Ryan James	Canberra Raiders	Canterbury-Bankstown Bulldogs (mid-season loan)	

Gains:

Player	Signed from	Notes
Ryan James	Gold Coast Titans	
Harry Rushton	Wigan Warriors	
Caleb Aekins	Penrith Panthers	

== 2021 Meninga Medal Award Winners ==
NSW Cup Player of the Year – Kai O’Donnell

NSW Cup Coaches Award – Matt Frawley

Geoff Caldwell Welfare & Education Award – Elliott Whitehead

Gordon McLucas Memorial Junior Representative Player of the Year - Trey Mooney

Fred Daly Memorial Club Person of the Year – Grant Hogan

NRL Rookie of the Year – Harley Smith-Shields & Matt Timoko

NRL Coaches Award – Tom Starling

Meninga Medal – Jordan Rapana
