= Vena Patuki-Case =

Australian rugby league footballer (born 2004)

Personal information
- Full name: Venasiotangifetaua Patuki-Case
- Born: 15 July 2004 (age 22) Sydney, New South Wales, Australia
- Height: 194 cm (6 ft 4 in)
- Weight: 110 kg (17 st 5 lb)

Playing information
- Position: Prop
Club
Years	Team	Pld	T	G	FG	P
2026–	Canberra Raiders	2	0	0	0	0
- Source: RLP

Venasiotangifetaua Patuki-Case (born 15 July 2004), known as Vena Patuki-Case, is an Australian rugby league footballer for the Canberra Raiders in the National Rugby League (NRL).

== Early life ==
Patuki-Case was born in Sydney and attended The Hills Sports High School.

A prop, Patuki-Case played his junior rugby league with Penrith club Cambridge Park and was initially attached to the Sydney Roosters, coming through their under-age sides with future Raiders teammate Ethan Strange.

== Career ==
Patuki-Case joined the Raiders in 2023 and has been developed as a possible successor to Josh Papalii. He had significant injury difficulties in his first few years in Canberra beginning with a Lisfranc fracture. This was followed by a broken leg for which he had a titanium plate inserted that ended up snapping.

During the 2026 NRL season, Patuki-Case made two appearances off the bench for the Raiders, debuting against the Parramatta Eels at Western Sydney Stadium in round 15.

== Personal life ==
Patuki-Case is an Indigenous Australian from the Wiradjuri nation.
