= John Strange (rugby league) =

Australian rugby league footballer (born 1975

Personal information
- Full name: John Strange
- Born: 22 January 1975 (age 51)

Playing information
- Position: Five-eighth, Fullback
Club
Years	Team	Pld	T	G	FG	P
1997	Featherstone Rovers	23	7	0	0	28
1998–99	York Wasps	40	14	0	6	62
2000	Sheffield Eagles	22	6	0	1	25
	Total	85	27	0	7	115

Coaching information
Club
Years	Team	Gms	W	D	L	W%
1999	York Wasps (interim)	4	2	0	2	50
2021–	Sydney Roosters Women	60	50	0	10	83
	Total	64	52	0	12	81
Representative
Years	Team	Gms	W	D	L	W%
2025–26	New South Wales	6	5	0	1	83
- Source: As of 14 November 2026
- Relatives: Ethan Strange (son); Jasmin Strange (daughter)

John Strange (born 22 January 1975) is a former Australian professional rugby league footballer who currently coaches the Sydney Roosters Women in the NRL Women's Premiership and the New South Wales women's rugby league team in the Women's State of Origin.

== Coaching career ==
On 25 February 2021, Strange was appointed as the coach of the Sydney Roosters, having previously acted as an assistant coach at the club. He led the side to its maiden NRLW premiership in 2021, (Note: The 2021 season was delayed to Autumn 2022 due to the COVID-19 pandemic.) and again in 2024 and 2026.

On 2 December 2024, Strange was appointed as the coach of the New South Wales Women's State of Origin team. He led the state to consecutive State of Origin series victories, in 2025 and 2026.

== Personal life ==
Strange is the father of professional rugby league footballers Ethan Strange, who plays for the Canberra Raiders in the National Rugby League (NRL), and Jasmin Strange, whom he coaches at the Roosters.
