= Hohepa Puru =

Australian rugby league footballer

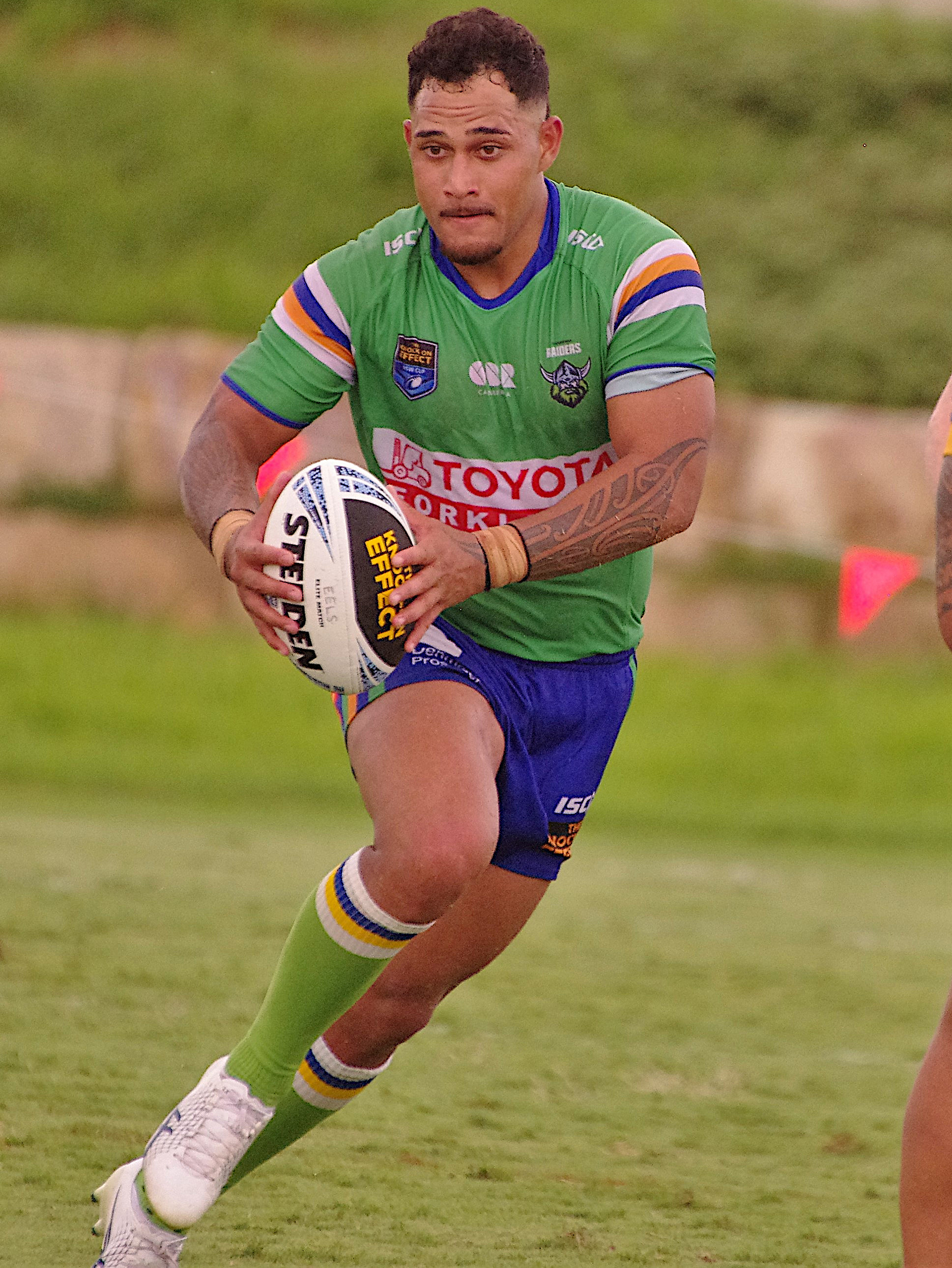

Personal information
- Full name: Hohepa Puru
- Born: 2 July 2002 (age 24) Blacktown, New South Wales, Australia
- Height: 177 cm (5 ft 10 in)
- Weight: 92 kg (14 st 7 lb)

Playing information
- Position: Lock
Club
Years	Team	Pld	T	G	FG	P
2023	Canberra Raiders	2	0	0	0	0
2025–	Cronulla Sharks	17	1	0	0	4
	Total	19	1	0	0	4
- Source: As of 5 September 2026

Hohepa Puru (born 2 July 2002) is an Australian rugby league footballer who plays as a lock for the Cronulla Sharks in the National Rugby League.

== Background ==
Puru is of Māori and Aboriginal Australian descent

Played for the Lalor Park kookaburras

== Playing career ==
In 2022, Puru was the captain of the Penrith Panthers' Jersey Flegg Cup (under-21s) grand final winning team.

In 2023, Puru joined the Canberra Raiders. In round 27 of the 2023 NRL season, Puru made his NRL debut for Canberra against the Cronulla-Sutherland Sharks at Pointsbet Stadium in a 24-6 loss. He re-signed with Canberra for the 2024 season, with an option for the 2025 season.

Puru signed with the Cronulla-Sutherland Sharks ahead of the 2025 season.

In September 2026, the Cronulla club announced that Puru had re-signed with the club for a further two years. He played 12 matches for Cronulla in the 2026 NRL season as the club finished 5th on the table and qualified for the finals.
