= Adrian Trevilyan =

Australian rugby league footballer

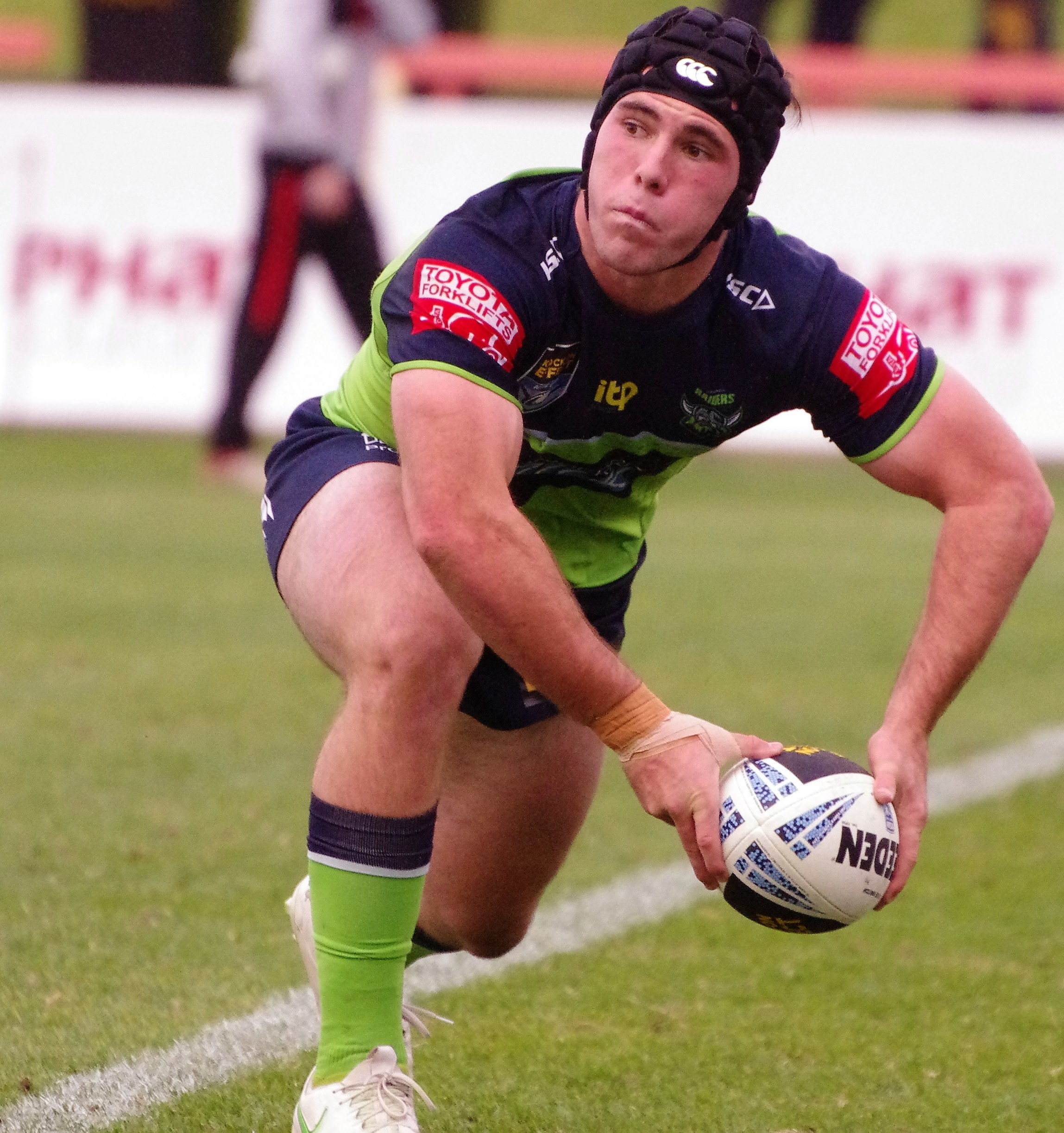

Personal information
- Born: 7 July 2001 (age 23); Townsville, Queensland, Australia
- Height: 177 cm (5 ft 10 in)
- Weight: 89 kg (14 st 0 lb)

Playing information
- Position: Hooker
Club
Years	Team	Pld	T	G	FG	P
2022–23	Canberra Raiders	3	0	0	0	0
- Source: As of 6 August 2023

Adrian Trevilyan (born 7 July 2001) is an Australian rugby league footballer who plays as a hooker for the Northern Pride RLFC in the Queensland Cup and previously played for the Canberra Raiders in the National Rugby League (NRL).

== Background ==
Trevilyan was born in Townsville, Queensland. He attended Kirwan State High School before being signed by the Canberra Raiders.

== Playing career ==
In 2019, Trevilyan played with Kirwan State High School in their NRL Schoolboy Cup final win over Westfields Sports High School. In October 2019, Trevilyan signed with the Canberra Raiders.

In 2020, Trevilyan was set to play for the Raiders' Jersey Flegg Cup team before the season was canceled due to the COVID-19 pandemic.

Trevilyan played the 2021 season in Canberra's NSW Cup team.

Trevilyan made his first grade debut in round 2 of the 2022 NRL season for Canberra against the North Queensland Cowboys.

On 30 October 2024, Trevilyan departed the Raiders and signed to play with Northern Pride in the Queensland Cup competition.
