= Tom Starling =

Australian rugby league footballer (b.1998)

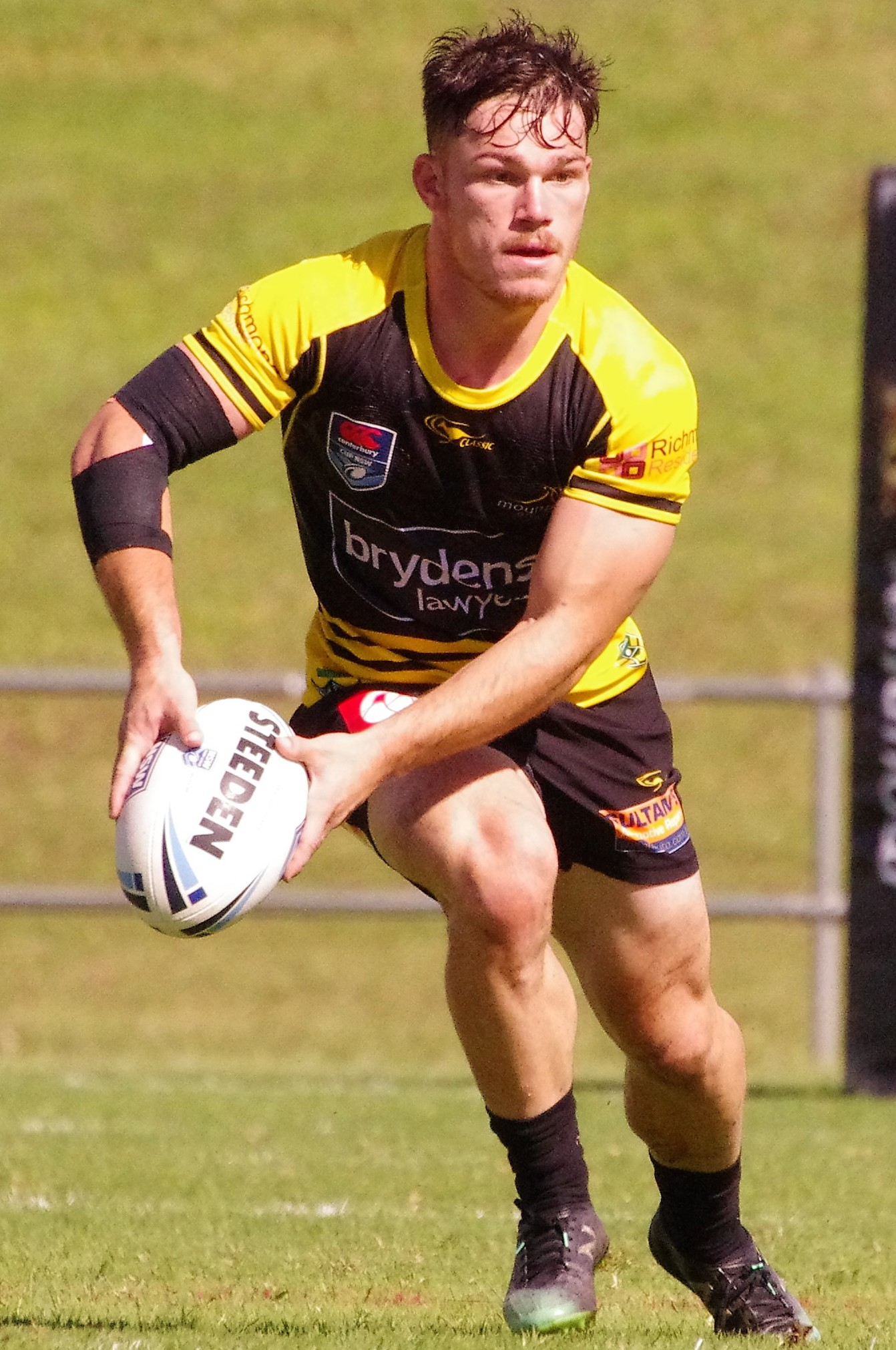

Personal information
- Full name: Thomas Starling
- Born: 4 June 1998 (age 28) Windsor, New South Wales, Australia
- Height: 170 cm (5 ft 7 in)
- Weight: 82 kg (12 st 13 lb)

Playing information
- Position: Hooker
Club
Years	Team	Pld	T	G	FG	P
2018	Newcastle Knights	1	0	0	0	0
2019–26	Canberra Raiders	155	17	0	0	68
2027–	St Helens	0	0	0	0	0
	Total	156	17	0	0	68
Representative
Years	Team	Pld	T	G	FG	P
2025	Prime Minister's XIII	1	0	0	0	0
- Source: As of 12 November 2026

Tom Starling (born 4 June 1998) is an Australian professional rugby league footballer who will play as a hooker for St Helens RFC in the Super League in 2027.

He previously played for the Newcastle Knights and the Canberra Raiders in the NRL.

== Background ==
Starling was born in Windsor, New South Wales, Australia. Starling is of Irish heritage.

He played his junior rugby league for the Kincumber Colts, before being signed by the Newcastle Knights.

== Playing career ==
=== Early years ===
In June 2015, Starling won the Newcastle Knights Carlson Club-Andrew Johns Medal for best under-18s player. In September 2015, he won the S. G. Ball Cup Player of the Year award for best under-18s player. From 2015 to 2017, he played for the Newcastle Knights' National Youth Competition team. In September 2017, he re-signed with Newcastle on a one-year contract until the end of 2018.

=== 2018 ===
In 2018, Starling alternated between the new Jersey Flegg Cup competition and Intrust Super Premiership NSW competition for the Knights. In round 25 of the 2018 NRL season, he made his NRL debut for the Newcastle Knights against the St. George Illawarra Dragons. He parted ways with the Newcastle club at the end of the season.

=== 2019 ===
In 2019, Starling joined the Canberra Raiders as a development player. In round 12, he was granted an exemption by the NRL to join the top squad as a player outside of the top 30 due to the Raiders' injury toll and players missing to State of Origin. He made his debut for Canberra off the interchange bench against the Canterbury-Bankstown Bulldogs, with Canberra winning 12–10.

Starling spent most of the year playing for Canberra's feeder club side Mounties in the Canterbury Cup NSW competition. Starling played in Mounties elimination final loss against Newtown at Campbelltown Stadium.

=== 2020 ===
Starling had a breakout year in 2020 after starting hooker Josh Hodgson went down with a season ending ACL injury. Starling entered the first grade side from round 10 onwards, rotating as the starting hooker with Siliva Havili and was instrumental in Canberra's run to the finals. Starling played in all three finals games for Canberra including the preliminary final loss to Melbourne.

Starling was rewarded for his stellar season with a two-year extension to keep him at the Canberra club until the end of 2022.

=== 2021 ===
In round 22 of the 2021 NRL season, Starling suffered a broken jaw in Canberra's loss against Melbourne. He was later ruled out for an indefinite period.

He played a total of 19 games for Canberra in the 2021 NRL season which saw the club finish 10th on the table and miss out on the finals.

=== 2022 ===
Starling featured in every game for Canberra in the 2022 NRL season as the club finished 8th on the table and qualified for the finals. Starling played in both finals matches as Canberra were eliminated in the second week by Parramatta.

=== 2023 ===
Starling played a total of 23 matches for Canberra in the 2023 NRL season as the club finished 8th on the table and qualified for the finals. Starling played in Canberra's 30-28 elimination finals loss against Newcastle.

=== 2024 ===
Starling played 23 games for Canberra in the 2024 NRL season as the club finished 9th on the table.

=== 2025 ===
On 7 May, Starling had re-signed with the Canberra outfit until the end of 2027. Starling played 24 matches for Canberra in the 2025 NRL season as the club claimed the Minor Premiership. He played in both finals matches as Canberra went out in straight sets losing to both Brisbane and Cronulla.

On 12 October 2025 he made his debut for the Prime Minister's XIII in the 28-10 win over PNG Prime Minister's XIII in Port Moresby

=== 2026 ===
Starling played 23 games for Canberra in the 2026 NRL season as the club finished 11th on the table and missed the finals. In October it was reported that Starling was released from the Raiders to pursue a three year deal in the Super League with Saint Helens. On the 14th October he annouced his department from the Canberra Raiders on his social media.

On 23 October 2026 it was reported that he had signed for St Helens RFC in the Super League on a three-year deal

== Statistics ==
Year	Team	Games	Tries	Pts
2018	Newcastle Knights	1		
2019	Canberra Raiders	3		
2020	Canberra Raiders	14	4	16
2021	Canberra Raiders	19	2	8
2022	Canberra Raiders	26	2	8
2023	Canberra Raiders	23	3	12
2024	Canberra Raiders	23		
2025	Canberra Raiders	24	4	16
2026	Canberra Raiders	23	2	8
2027	St Helens			
	Totals	156	17	68

*denotes season competing

== Controversy ==
On 5 December 2020, Starling was arrested and charged with assaulting police after a fight broke out at the Shady Palms Bar Restaurant in Kincumber on the Central Coast. Starling was reportedly charged with five counts of assaulting an officer in the execution of duty, affray and resisting arrest.

On 21 January 2021, Starling had six of the seven charges against him dropped.

On 20 October 2021, it was reported by the media that Starling had been arrested by NSW Police after an altercation at a Central Coast Bar. Starling was charged with threatening or causing injury to potential juror or witness and behaving in offensive manner in or near public place or school. Starling was granted conditional bail to appear at Gosford Local Court on 11 January 2022.

In 2023, Starling's charges were dropped as the police who arrested him and his brothers were charged with assault. In 2024 Starling and his lawyers later sued NSW Police in a civil suit.
