= Elijah Anderson (rugby league) =

Australian rugby league footballer (b.1999)

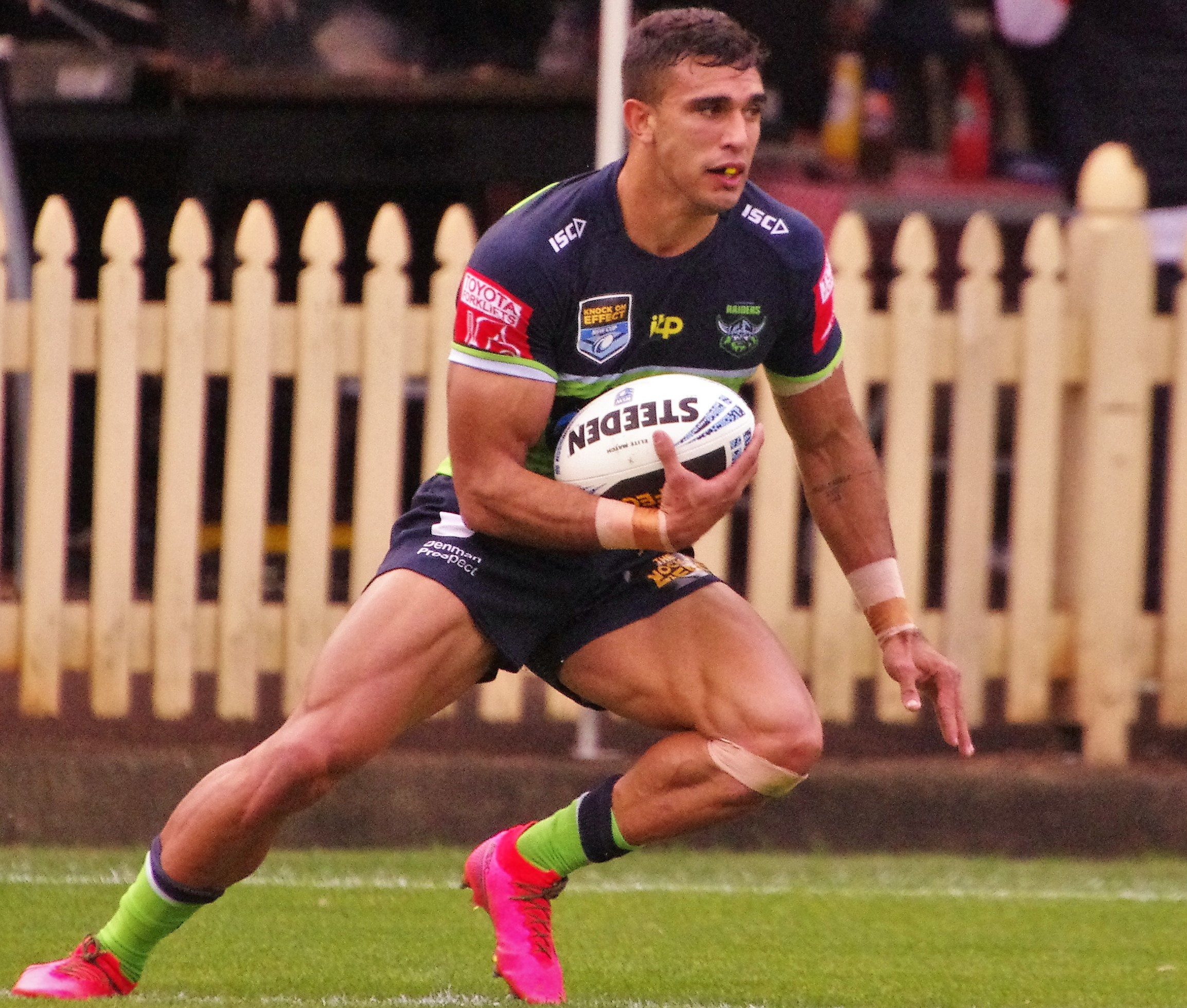

Personal information
- Full name: Elijah Anderson
- Born: 3 January 1999 (age 26)
- Height: 185 cm (6 ft 1 in)
- Weight: 89 kg (14 st 0 lb)

Playing information
- Position: Wing
Club
Years	Team	Pld	T	G	FG	P
2021	Canberra Raiders	1	0	0	0	0
- Source: As of 7 August 2021

Elijah Anderson (born 3 January 1999) is a professional rugby league footballer who plays as a winger for the Redcliffe Dolphins in the Queensland Cup. Anderson previously played for the Canberra Raiders in the NRL.

== Playing career ==
In round 21 of the 2021 NRL season, Anderson made his first grade debut for Canberra against the St. George Illawarra Dragons.
