= Jarrod Croker =

Australian rugby league footballer

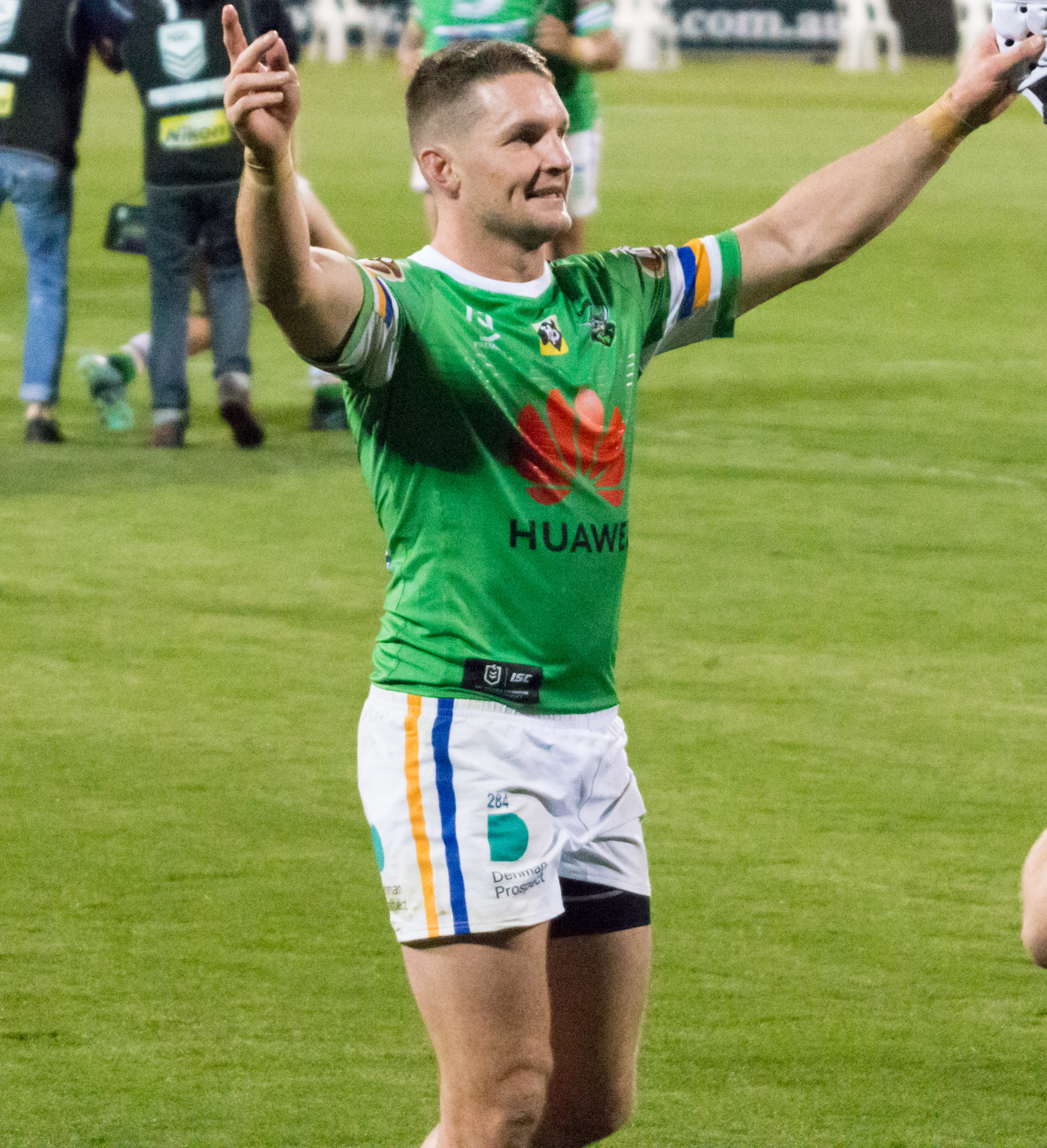
- Croker in 2019

Personal information
- Full name: Jarrod Keith Croker
- Born: 11 September 1990 (age 36) Goulburn, New South Wales, Australia
- Height: 183 cm (6 ft 0 in)
- Weight: 94 kg (14 st 11 lb)

Playing information
- Position: Centre
Club
Years	Team	Pld	T	G	FG	P
2009–23	Canberra Raiders	307	136	915	0	2374
Representative
Years	Team	Pld	T	G	FG	P
2014–15	Prime Minister's XIII	2	1	2	0	8
2015	NRL All Stars	1	0	1	0	2
2015–16	NSW Country	2	1	5	0	14
2016–17	World All Stars	2	0	0	0	0
- Source: As of 26 August 2023

Jarrod Keith Croker (born 11 September 1990) is an Australian former professional rugby league footballer who played as a centre and captained the Canberra Raiders in the National Rugby League.

Croker spent his entire career with Canberra, with whom he became the 2012, 2015 and 2016 top point-scorer in the NRL. Croker is a Country Origin, Prime Minister's XIII, NRL All Stars and World All Stars representative. In 2016, Croker won the Dally M Captain of the year award. Croker is the top try scorer and highest point-scorer in Canberra Raiders history. With 2374 career points, he is also the fourth highest points-scorer of all time behind only Adam Reynolds, Hazem El Masri and Cameron Smith .

== Background ==
Croker was born in Goulburn, New South Wales, Australia.

Croker played his junior football for the Goulburn Stockmen before signing with the Canberra Raiders.

== Playing career ==
He played for the New South Wales Schoolboys and Australian Schoolboys representative teams in 2007 before being selected for the New South Wales under-18s in 2008. Croker was part of the Canberra team that won the inaugural National Youth Competition in 2008. He played at centre and was involved in the try that won the Raiders the match 28-24 in golden point extra time.

=== 2009 ===
Croker broke into Canberra's first-grade side in 2009, making his debut in round 2 against the Sydney Roosters. In round 3, against the Parramatta Eels, Croker scored his first NRL try in the Raiders 16-18 loss at Parramatta Stadium. He went on to make 21 appearances in his rookie season, and was the Raiders highest try scorer with 12 tries. On 3 September, Croker re-signed with the Raiders to the end of the 2012 season.

=== 2010 ===
Croker was again a regular in Canberra's 2010 side, making 25 appearances as Canberra finished 7th and made the NRL finals. However, it was a missed penalty goal from Croker that ended the Raiders' season. In a sudden-death finals match against the Wests Tigers, in front of a home crowd of 26,476, he pushed wide a 30-metre kick that would have tied the match at 26-26. Canberra's coach David Furner—himself a former Raiders goalkicker—defended Croker, arguing his goalkicking form had won a number of matches for the team during the season. Days later, Croker was selected for Australia's train-on squad for the Four Nations tournament. Croker played in all of Canberra's 26 matches and was the club's highest point scorer with 5 tries and 53 goals.

=== 2011 ===
On 6 August, Croker re-signed with the capital club until the end of the 2013 season. He finished the season as Canberra's highest point scorer with nine tries and 53 goals in 23 matches.

=== 2012 ===
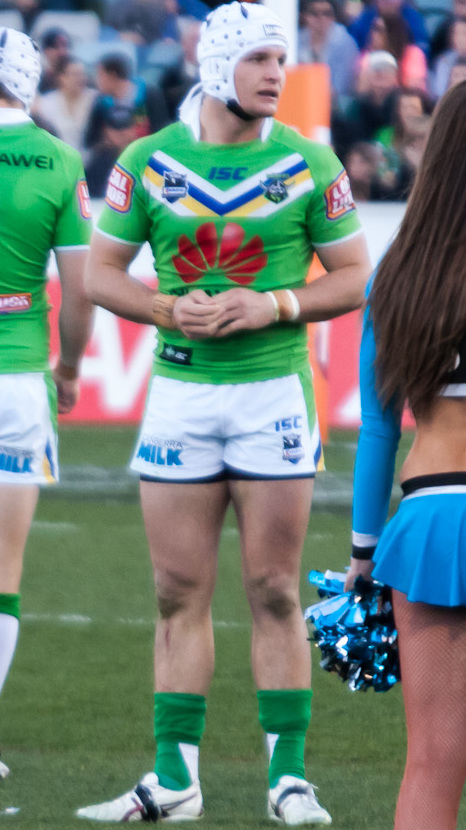
Croker playing for the Raiders in 2012

Croker was the NRL's leading points scorer in 2012 with a total of 226 points, scoring 16 tries and kicking 81 goals in 25 matches.

=== 2013 ===
In round 5, against the Sydney Roosters, Croker played his 100th NRL match in Canberra's 24-22 win, kicking the winning goal after scoring a try in the final minutes of the match at Canberra Stadium. On 13 April, he re-signed with the Canberra club to the end of the 2015 season. In round 25, against the New Zealand Warriors, Croker scored his first hat-trick of tries and also scored all of the club's points in the Canberra clubs 50-16 loss at Mt Smart Stadium. He finished the season as Canberra's highest point with nine tries and 52 goals.

=== 2014 ===
In February, Croker played in the Raiders Auckland Nines team. In round 24, against the Cronulla-Sutherland Sharks, Croker surpassed club legend Mal Meninga's 864 club career points, taking him to third highest point scorer for Canberra. He finished the year as the highest point scorer and try scorer for the Canberra side, scoring 18 tries and scoring 202 points. On 5 September, Croker re-signed with the Raiders until the end of the 2018 season. He was named as the 2014 Meninga Medallist for Raiders' best and fairest player.

On 12 October, Croker played for the Prime Minister's XIII team against Papua New Guinea, filling in for Raiders teammate Jack Wighton on the interchange bench after he was a late scratching. On 19 December, Croker was named by coach Ricky Stuart as the new captain for the Canberra Raiders following the departure of Terry Campese to Hull Kingston Rovers in the Super League.

=== 2015 ===
In the pre-season, Croker was captain of the Raiders Auckland Nines squad. On 13 February 2015, Croker played at centre for NRL All Stars against the Indigenous All Stars, kicking a goal in the 20-6 loss at Robina Stadium.

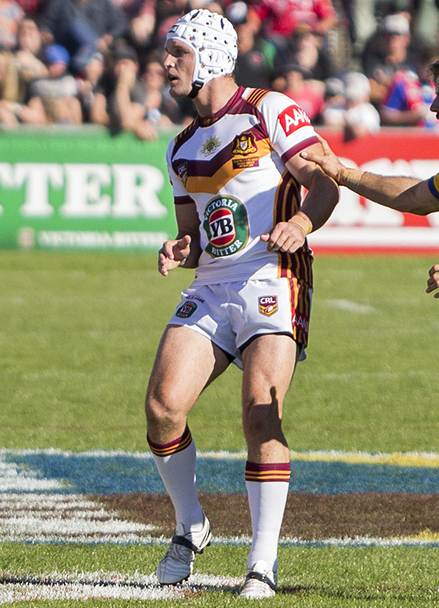
Croker playing for Country in 2015

On 3 May 2015, Croker played for Country Origin against City Origin, scoring a try in the 34-22 win at Wagga Wagga. In round 10, against the St George Illawarra Dragons, Croker played in 150th NRL match in Canberra's 32-18 loss at WIN Stadium. In round 13, against the Newcastle Knights, Croker notched a 1000 career points in Canberra's 44-22 win at Hunter Stadium. At the end of the season, Croker was the NRL's top point scorer with 236 points. On 26 September, Croker played for the Prime Minister's XIII against Papua New Guinea.

=== 2016 ===
In February 2016, Croker was named in the Raiders 2016 NRL Auckland Nines squad. On 13 February 2016, Croker played for the World All Stars against the Indigenous All Stars, playing at centre in the 12-8 win at Suncorp Stadium. On 8 May 2016, Croker again represented Country Origin against City Origin, kicking five goals in the 44-30 loss in Tamworth. In round 10 against the St. George Illawarra Dragons, Croker became the highest ever point scorer for Canberra in the 16-12 golden point loss at Jubilee Oval. At the end of the season, Croker picked up the Provan Summons award as well as Dally M Captain of the Year and season's leading point scorer in a year were the capital club fell one game short of the Grand Final. Croker played in all of the Canberra clubs 27 matches, scoring 18 tries and kicking 112 goals in the 2016 NRL season. After the season ended, Croker was named the Australia Four Nations train-on squad but later dropped out due to a knee injury.

=== 2017 ===
On 10 February 2017, Croker played for the World All Stars against the Indigenous All Stars in the 2017 All Stars match, playing at centre in the 34-8 loss at Hunter Stadium. In round 5 against the Parramatta Eels in the 30-18 win at Canberra Stadium, Croker became the third player to score 100 tries for Canberra, after Jason Croker and Brett Mullins, and the fifth player to score 100 tries and kick 500 goals in Australian first grade rugby league. He also became only the seventh player after Terry Lamb (Canterbury-Bankstown), Greg Alexander (Penrith), Ryan Girdler (Penrith), Hazem El Masri (Canterbury-Bankstown), Darren Lockyer (Brisbane) and Luke Burt (Parramatta) to score 100 tries and over 1,000 points for a single club. In Round 11 against the Parramatta Eels, Croker played his 200th NRL career match in the Raiders 22-16 win at ANZ Stadium. On 10 August 2017, Croker extended his contract with the capital club to the end of the 2020 season. Croker finished the 2017 NRL season with him scoring nine tries and kicking 77 goals for Canberra.

=== 2018 ===
In round 18 against the North Queensland Cowboys, Croker suffered a season ending knee injury in the Raiders 38-12 win at Canberra Stadium. Croker finished the 2018 NRL season with him playing in 17 matches, scoring seven and kicking 63 goals for the Canberra side.

=== 2019 ===
On 13 February 2019, after being the solo captain for the Canberra club for the past four years, coach Ricky Stuart appointed hooker Josh Hodgson as co-captain alongside Croker for the season. Croker made his return from injury in round 1 against the Gold Coast Titans, kicking four goals in the 21-0 win at Robina Stadium.

In round 17 against St. George, Croker became Canberra's all-time leading try scorer with 120 tries surpassing Jason Croker in a 36-14 victory at WIN Stadium. In round 22 against Melbourne, Croker scored two tries as Canberra came from 18-0 down at halftime to win the match 22-18 at AAMI Park. It was the first time since 2015 that Melbourne had lost two games in a row at their home stadium.

Canberra finished the 2019 regular season in 4th place on the table and qualified for the finals. The club would then go on to qualify for their first grand final in 25 years. Croker captained Canberra in the 2019 NRL Grand Final as they were defeated 14-8 by the Sydney Roosters at ANZ Stadium.

=== 2020 ===
Croker played 22 games for Canberra in the 2020 NRL season as the club finished 5th on the table and qualified for the finals. Croker played in all three finals matches including the preliminary final loss to Melbourne.

=== 2021 ===
Croker was limited to only 12 appearances for Canberra in the 2021 NRL season due to injury and poor form. Despite this, he still managed to be the club's top point scorer for the year. Canberra would finish the campaign in 10th place on the table and miss out on the finals.

=== 2022 ===
After being left out of the Canberra side for the opening eight rounds, Croker made his return in round 9 of the 2022 NRL season against Canterbury. Croker was taken from the field towards the end of the match with a shoulder injury during the clubs 14-4 victory. On 9 June, Croker was ruled out for the rest of the 2022 NRL season after aggravating his shoulder injury in a freak accident at home.

=== 2023 ===
In round 6 of the 2023 NRL season, Croker made his return to the Canberra side in their 20-14 upset victory over Brisbane. In round 15, Croker made his 300th first grade appearance in Canberra's 36-14 loss against the New Zealand Warriors.

On 13 August, Croker announced he would retire at the end of the season. Croker's last game was Canberra's 18-29 loss to the Brisbane Broncos in round 26, in which he played just three minutes.

== Post playing ==
Prior to the kick off of the 2024 NRL season, the Raiders announced that Croker would stay at the club as a goal-kicking coach across all of the clubs junior and senior teams.

On 15 September 2025, Croker was inducted as a life member of the Raiders.

On 16 January 2026, the Manly Warringah Sea Eagles announced that Croker had joined the team as a goal kicking coach and would also share duel kicking coach duties at the Canberra Raiders.

== Career statistics ==
=== Domestic ===
Year	Team	Games	Tries	Goals	Pts
2009	Canberra Raiders	21	12		48
2010	Canberra Raiders	26	5	53	126
2011	Canberra Raiders	23	9	59	154
2012	Canberra Raiders	25	16	81	226
2013	Canberra Raiders	21	8	52	136
2014	Canberra Raiders	24	18	65	202
2015	Canberra Raiders	24	12	94	236
2016	Canberra Raiders	27	18	112	296
2017	Canberra Raiders	22	9	77	190
2018	Canberra Raiders	17	7	63	154
2019	Canberra Raiders	27	13	88	228
2020	Canberra Raiders	22	5	71	162
2021	Canberra Raiders	12	1	38	80
2022	Canberra Raiders	1		3	6
2023	Canberra Raiders	15	3	59	130
	Totals	307	136	915	2374

=== Representative ===
Year	Team	App	T	G	FG	Pts
2014	Prime Minister's XIII	1	-	-	-	-
2015	Prime Minister's XIII	1	1	2	-	8
2015	NRL All Stars	1	-	1	-	2
2015	Country	1	1	-	-	4
2016	Country	1	-	5	-	10
2016	World All Stars	1	-	-	-	-
2017	World All Stars	1	-	-	-	-
Totals	Total	7	2	8	-	24
