= Matthew Timoko =

New Zealand international rugby league footballer

Matt Timoko
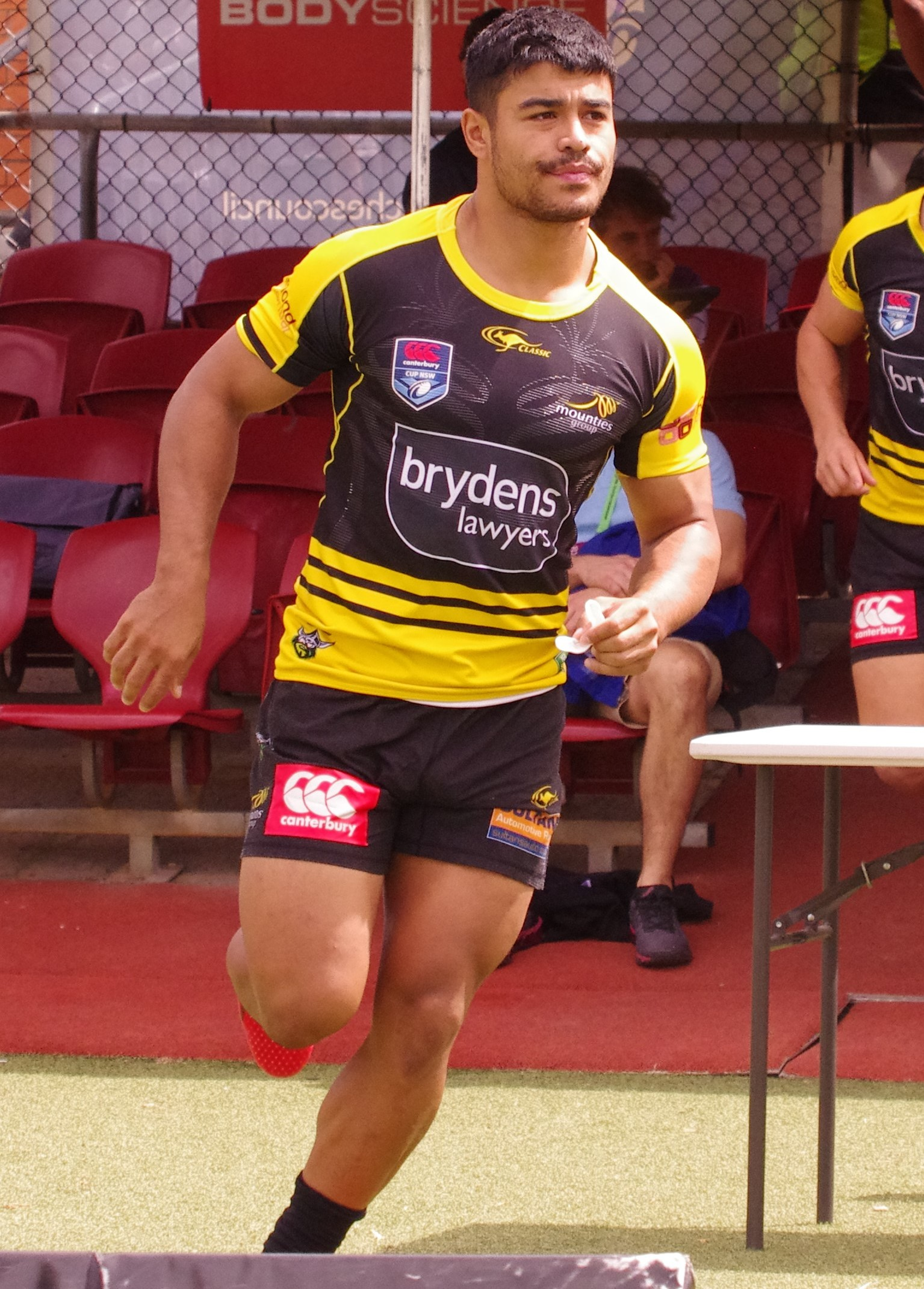

Personal information
- Full name: Matthew Timoko
- Born: 18 January 2000 (age 26) Auckland, New Zealand
- Height: 183 cm (6 ft 0 in)
- Weight: 97 kg (15 st 4 lb)

Playing information
- Position: Centre
Club
Years	Team	Pld	T	G	FG	P
2020–	Canberra Raiders	130	40	0	0	160
Representative
Years	Team	Pld	T	G	FG	P
2023–25	New Zealand	9	3	0	0	12
2024	Māori All Stars	1	0	0	0	0
- Source: As of 6 November 2026

Matthew Timoko (born 18 January 2000) is a New Zealand professional rugby league footballer who plays as a centre for the Canberra Raiders in the National Rugby League and New Zealand and New Zealand Māori at international level.

== Background ==
Timoko was born in Auckland, New Zealand, and is of Samoan and Māori descent. Timoko attended Auckland Grammar School.

== Career ==
=== 2020 ===
Timoko made his NRL debut in round 16 of the 2020 NRL season for Canberra against the Canterbury-Bankstown Bulldogs; he replaced an injured Curtis Scott in the 47th minute as the Canberra club won the game 34–20.

=== 2021 ===
Timoko played nine games for Canberra in the 2021 NRL season as the club finished 10th on the table.

=== 2022 ===
In round 3 of the 2022 NRL season, Timoko scored two tries for Canberra in their 24-22 victory over the Gold Coast. Timoko played 26 games for the club in the 2022 NRL season including both of their finals matches as Canberra were eliminated in the second week by Parramatta.

=== 2023 ===
In round 25 of the 2023 NRL season, Timoko scored two tries for Canberra in their 36-24 victory over Canterbury. Timoko played a total of 25 matches for Canberra in the 2023 NRL season and scored eleven tries as the club finished 8th on the table and qualified for the finals. Timoko played in the clubs elimination finals loss against Newcastle.

=== 2024 ===
In round 5 of the 2024 NRL season, Timoko scored two tries in Canberra's 41-8 victory over Parramatta. He played a total of 24 games for Canberra in the 2024 NRL season as the club finished 9th on the table.

=== 2025 ===
In round 11 of the 2025 NRL season, Timoko scored two tries in Canberra's 40-24 victory over the Gold Coast. Timoko played 25 matches for Canberra in the 2025 NRL season as the club claimed the Minor Premiership. He played in both finals matches as Canberra went out in straight sets losing to both Brisbane and Cronulla.

=== 2026 ===
On 31 August, the capital club announced that Timoko had re-signed until 2027 with a player option for 2028. Timoko featured in 19 games for Canberra in the 2026 NRL season as the club finished 11th on the table and missed the finals.

== Statistics ==
Year	Team	Games	Tries	Pts
2020	Canberra Raiders	2		
2021	Canberra Raiders	9		
2022	Canberra Raiders	26	9	36
2023	Canberra Raiders	25	11	44
2024	Canberra Raiders	24	4	16
2025	Canberra Raiders	25	10	40
2026	Canberra Raiders	17	6	24
	Totals	129	40	160

source;
