= Ethan Strange =

Australia international rugby league footballer

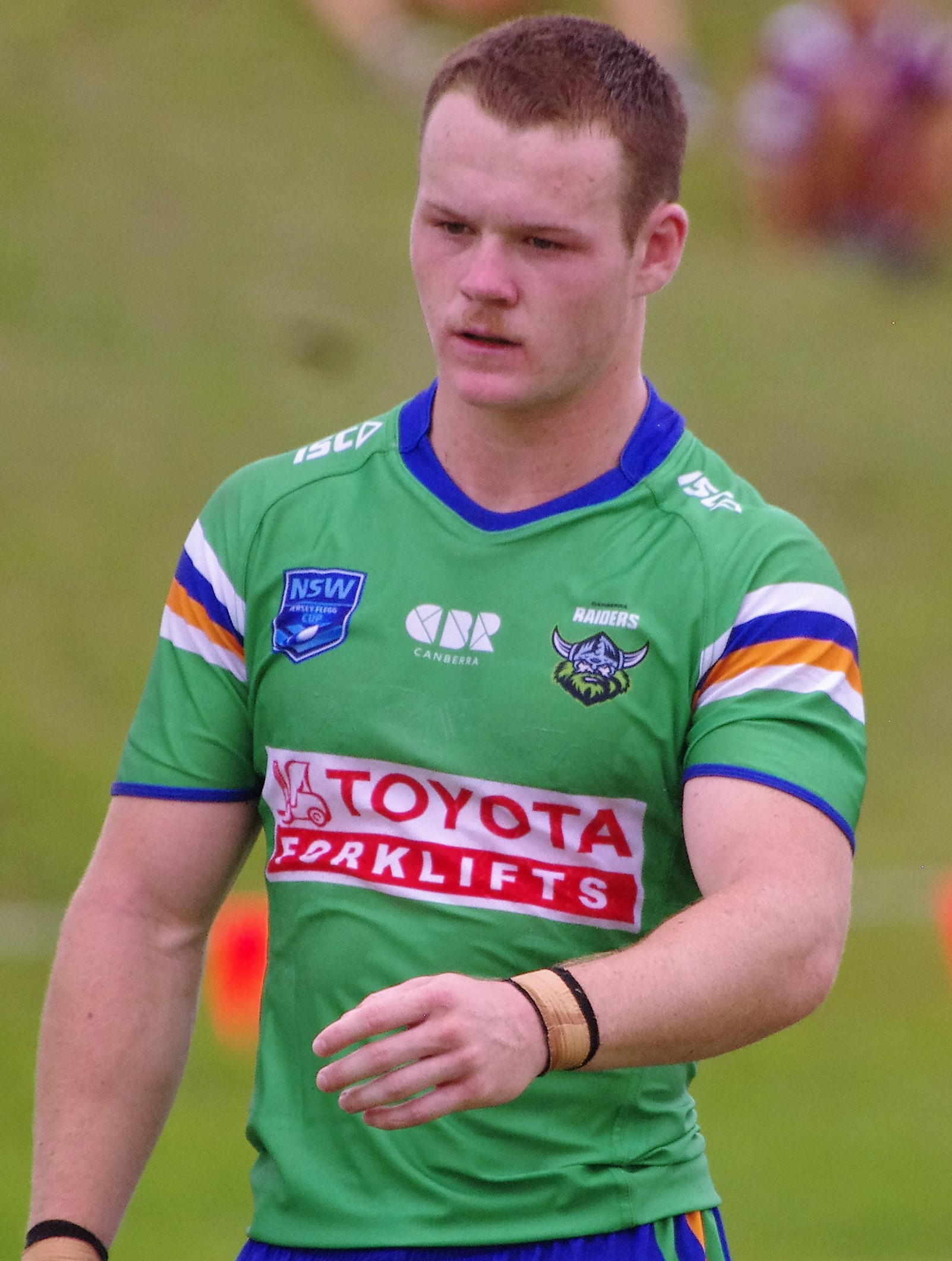

Personal information
- Full name: Ethan Strange
- Born: 16 August 2004 (age 22) Gosford, New South Wales, Australia
- Height: 186 cm (6 ft 1 in)
- Weight: 92 kg (14 st 7 lb)

Playing information
- Position: Five-eighth, Centre
Club
Years	Team	Pld	T	G	FG	P
2023–	Canberra Raiders	67	23	5	0	102
Representative
Years	Team	Pld	T	G	FG	P
2025	Prime Minister's XIII	1	0	0	0	0
2026	New South Wales	3	1	0	0	4
2026	Australia	2	0	1	0	2
- Source: As of 16 November 2026
- Father: John Strange
- Relatives: Jasmin Strange (sister)

Ethan Strange (born 16 August 2004) is an Australian professional rugby league footballer who plays as five-eighth or centre for the Canberra Raiders in the National Rugby League.

He has played for the Prime Minister's XIII at representative level and more recently starred in New South Wales' 22-20 defeat of Queensland in State of Origin Game 1, 2026.

== Playing career ==
Strange was born in Gosford from the Central Coast of New South Wales.

=== 2010 to 2022 ===
Ethan Strange played junior rugby league for The Entrance Tigers finishing up with a stint in their Denton Cup team. Strange started his early football playing full-back but moved to five-eighth for most of his junior football career.

=== 2020 - 2021 ===
Strange played for the Central Coast Roosters Harold Matthews team in 2020 (Under 16s) and 2021 (Under 17s).

=== 2022 ===
In 2022, Strange played for the Sydney Roosters in their SG Ball team. Following the conclusion of the SG Ball competition, he moved to Canberra to play from Round 19 in the Canberra Raiders Jersey Flegg team. Strange played the last 4 games of the season.

=== 2023 ===
Strange started 2023 in the Canberra Raiders Jersey Flegg Team. From Round 6, he moved to the Knock on Effect NSW Cup Team playing 16 games during the season.

In July 2023, Strange was selected to play Under 19s Men's State of Origin for NSWRL where he scored a hat-trick and was named Player of the Match. Strange played as a centre, a position he had only played a couple of times in his football career.

Strange made his NRL debut as a centre in Round 24 against the Melbourne Storm in a 48–2 loss.

=== 2024 ===
After a long preseason battling for the five-eighth jersey, Strange was selected to play in the number six jersey for Canberra Raiders in their opening round of the 2024 season against the Newcastle Knights where they won 28-12. The following week in a match against the Wests Tigers, Strange scored his first career try. Canberra would win 32-12. Strange played 21 games for Canberra in the 2024 NRL season as the club finished 9th on the table. In April, Strange extended his contract with the Raiders until the end of 2028.

=== 2025 ===
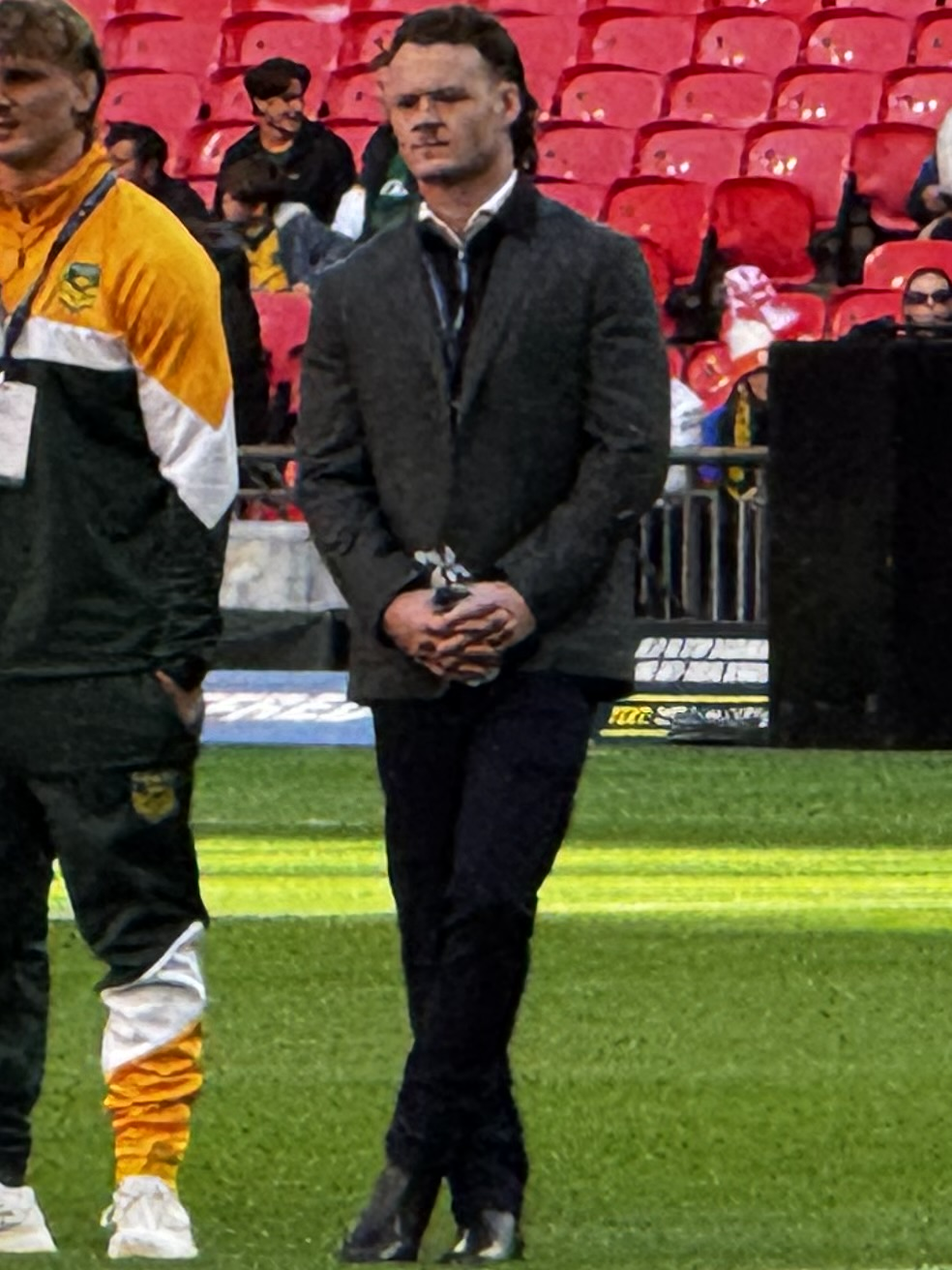
Strange on international duty for Australia in 2025

In round 23, Strange scored a hat-trick in Canberra's victory over Manly. In Round 25, Strange's 70 metre run was instrumental in the Canberra Raiders' match-winning try to beat the four-time Premiers Penrith in golden point. Strange would miss the Raiders semi-final clash against the Sharks due to illness.

He made his debut for the Prime Minister's XIII on 12 October 2025 in Port Moresby, where Australia beat PNG Prime Minister's XIII 28-10.

=== 2026 ===
Following a pre-match injury to Mitchell Moses, Strange was selected to start at five-eighth in Game 1 of the 2026 State of Origin series. He would go on to score a try in the match as New South Wales won 22-20. Strange played 21 matches for Canberra in the 2026 NRL season as the club finished 11th on the table and missed the finals.

He made his Australia international début in the 2026 Rugby League World Cup 66-6 win over Cook Islands on 31 October 2026.

== Statistics ==
Year	Team	Games	Tries	Goals	Pts
2023	Canberra Raiders	1			
2024	Canberra Raiders	21	2		8
2025	Canberra Raiders	24	14	5	66
2026	Canberra Raiders	21	7		28
2027	Canberra Raiders				
	Totals	67	23	5	102

== Honours ==
Representative

- Rugby League World Cup Champion: 2026
