= Harley Smith-Shields =

Australian rugby league footballer

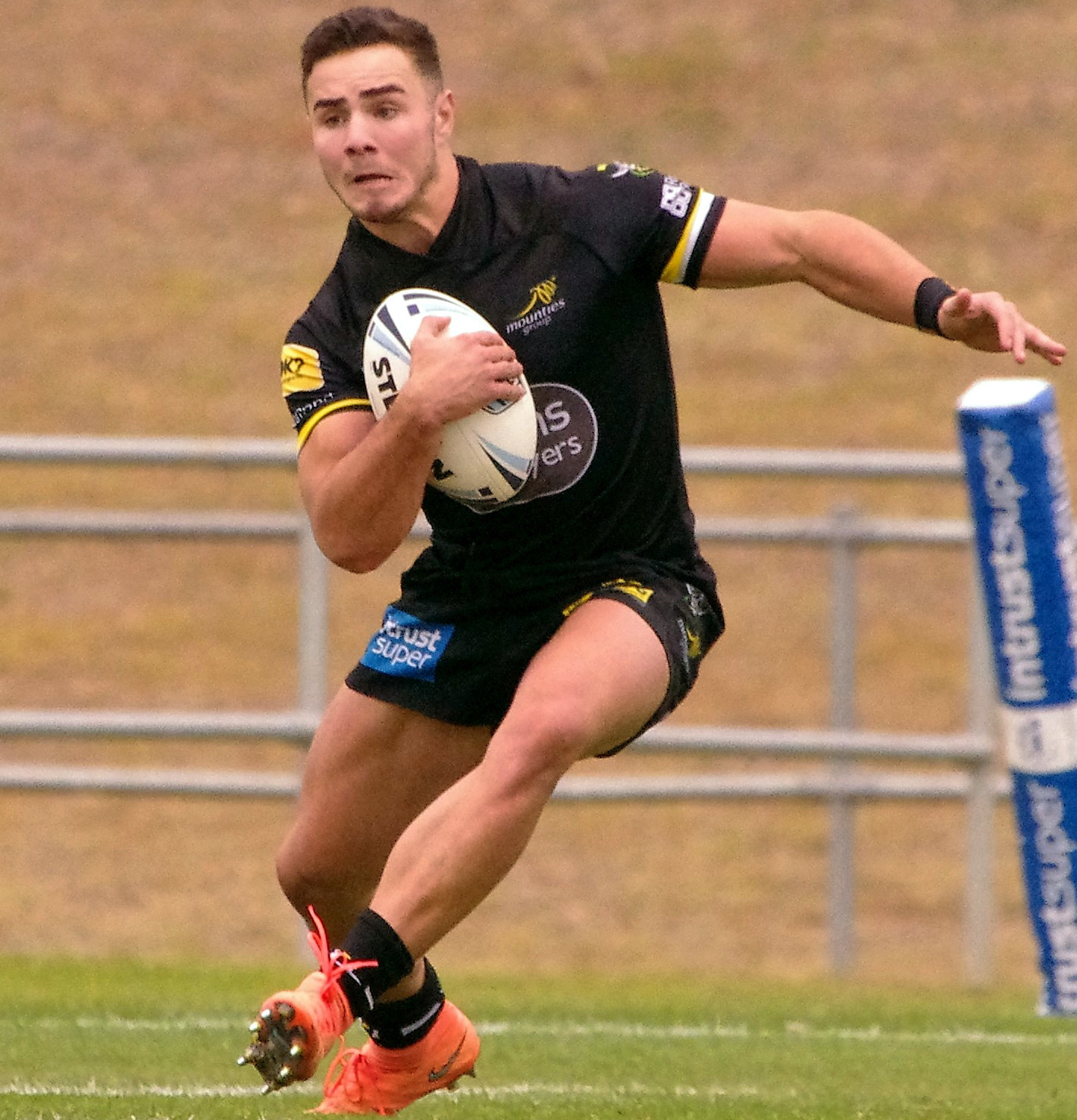

Personal information
- Born: 13 January 2000 (age 26) Canberra, Australian Capital Territory, Australia
- Height: 183 cm (6 ft 0 in)
- Weight: 94 kg (14 st 11 lb)

Playing information
- Position: Wing, Centre
Club
Years	Team	Pld	T	G	FG	P
2020–23	Canberra Raiders	15	4	0	0	16
2024	Gold Coast Titans	5	1	0	0	4
	Total	20	5	0	0	20
- Source: As of 12 May 2024

Harley Smith-Shields (born 13 January 2000) is a professional rugby league footballer who last played as a winger or centre for the Gold Coast Titans in the National Rugby League (NRL).

== Early career ==
=== 2020 ===
Smith-Shields made his first grade debut in round 11 of the 2020 NRL season for the Raiders against the South Sydney Rabbitohs.

In round 20, he scored his first try in the top grade in a 38-28 victory over Cronulla-Sutherland at Kogarah Oval.

=== 2021 ===
Smith-Shields played seven games for Canberra in the 2021 NRL season which saw the club finish a disappointing 10th on the table.

=== 2022 ===
In February, Smith-Shields was ruled out for the entire 2022 NRL season after rupturing his ACL.

=== 2023 ===
On 8 August, it was reported that Smith-Shields was to join Parramatta on loan for the remainder of the 2023 NRL season but the move was blocked by Parramatta's retention and recruitment team at the 11th hour. On 26 November, Smith-Shields signed a contract to join the Gold Coast ahead of the 2024 NRL season.

=== 2024 ===
In round 5 of the 2024 NRL season, Smith-Shields made his club debut for the Gold Coast in their 35-22 loss against North Queensland. Smith-Shields was ruled out for the remainder of the season after he injured his pec in the Gold Coast's round 10 win against North Queensland.

=== 2025 ===
Smith-Shields was one of eight players who was farewelled by the Gold Coast Titans at the end of the season.
