= Ata Mariota =

Samoa international rugby league footballer

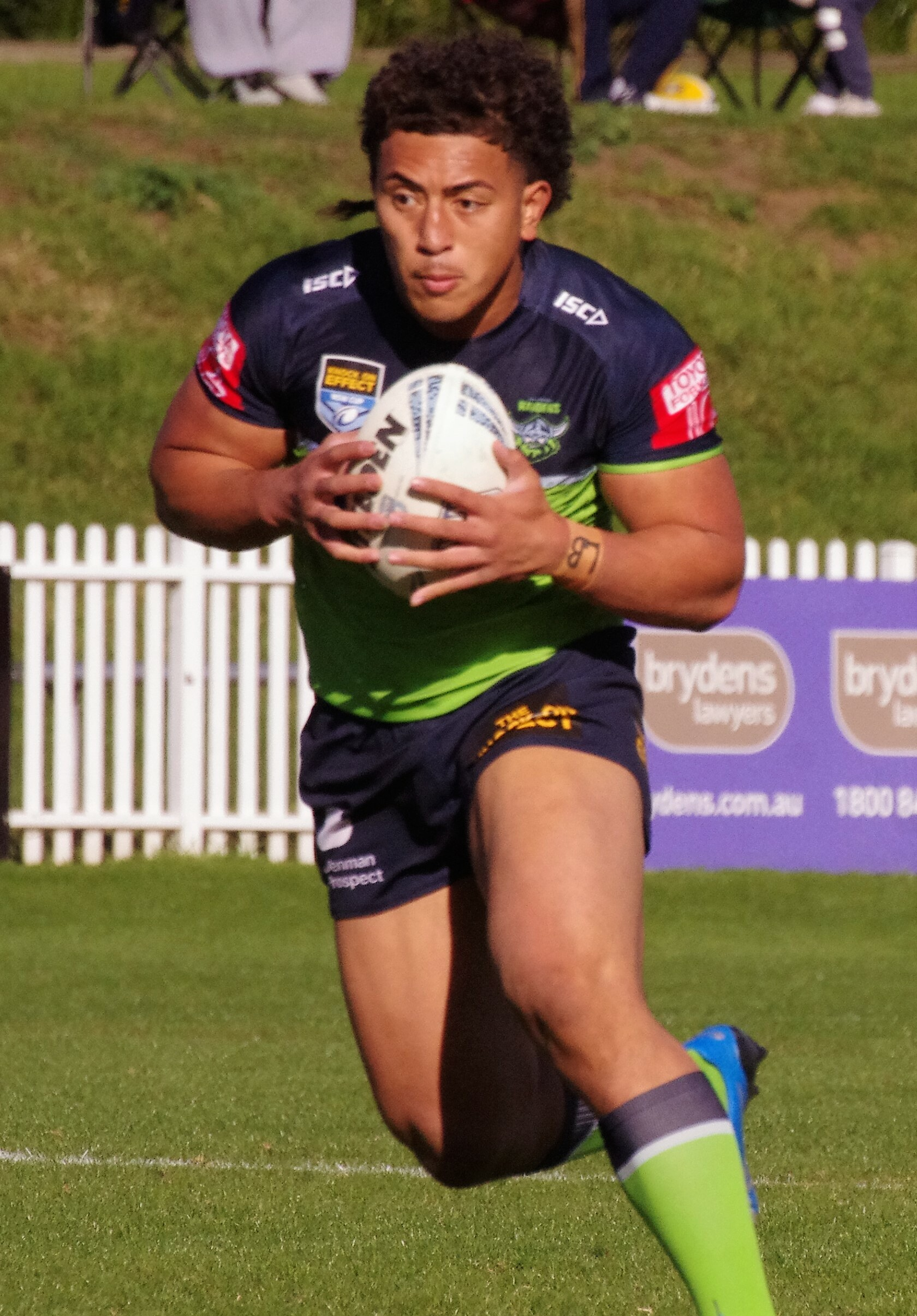

Personal information
- Born: 28 December 2001 (age 24) Apia, Samoa
- Height: 184 cm (6 ft 0 in)
- Weight: 106 kg (16 st 10 lb)

Playing information
- Position: Prop, Second-row
Club
Years	Team	Pld	T	G	FG	P
2022–	Canberra Raiders	90	4	0	0	16
Representative
Years	Team	Pld	T	G	FG	P
2025–	Samoa	4	1	0	0	4
- Source: As of 8 November 2026

Ata Mariota (born 28 December 2001) is a Samoan professional rugby league footballer who plays as a prop or second-row for the Canberra Raiders in the NRL and Samoa at international level.

== Background ==
Mariota was born in Apia, Samoa.

He played his junior rugby league for the Manurewa Marlins and attended Manurewa High School where he also played rugby union.

== Career ==
=== 2022 ===
In round 21 of the 2022 NRL season, Mariota made his first grade debut for Canberra against the Penrith Panthers. He entered the game as a concussion replacement (18th man) for Ryan Sutton after he failed his HIA.

=== 2023 ===
Mariota played a total of 17 matches for Canberra in the 2023 NRL season as the club finished 8th on the table and qualified for the finals. He played in the clubs elimination final loss to Newcastle.

=== 2024 ===
Mariota played 23 matches for Canberra in the 2024 NRL season as the club finished 9th on the table.

=== 2025 ===
Mariota played 26 matches for Canberra in the 2025 NRL season as the club claimed the Minor Premiership. He played in both finals matches as Canberra went out in straight sets losing to both Brisbane and Cronulla.

=== 2026 ===
On 13 August 2026, the capital club announced that Mariota had re-signed with the club for the further two years. Mariota played 24 games with Canberra 2026 NRL season as the club finished 11th on the table and missed the finals.

== Statistics ==
Year	Team	Games	Tries	Pts
2022	Canberra Raiders	1		
2023	Canberra Raiders	17	1	4
2024	Canberra Raiders	23	2	8
2025	Canberra Raiders	23		
2026	Canberra Raiders	21		
2027	Canberra Raiders			
	Totals	87	3	12
