= Elliott Whitehead =

Great Britain and England international rugby league footballer

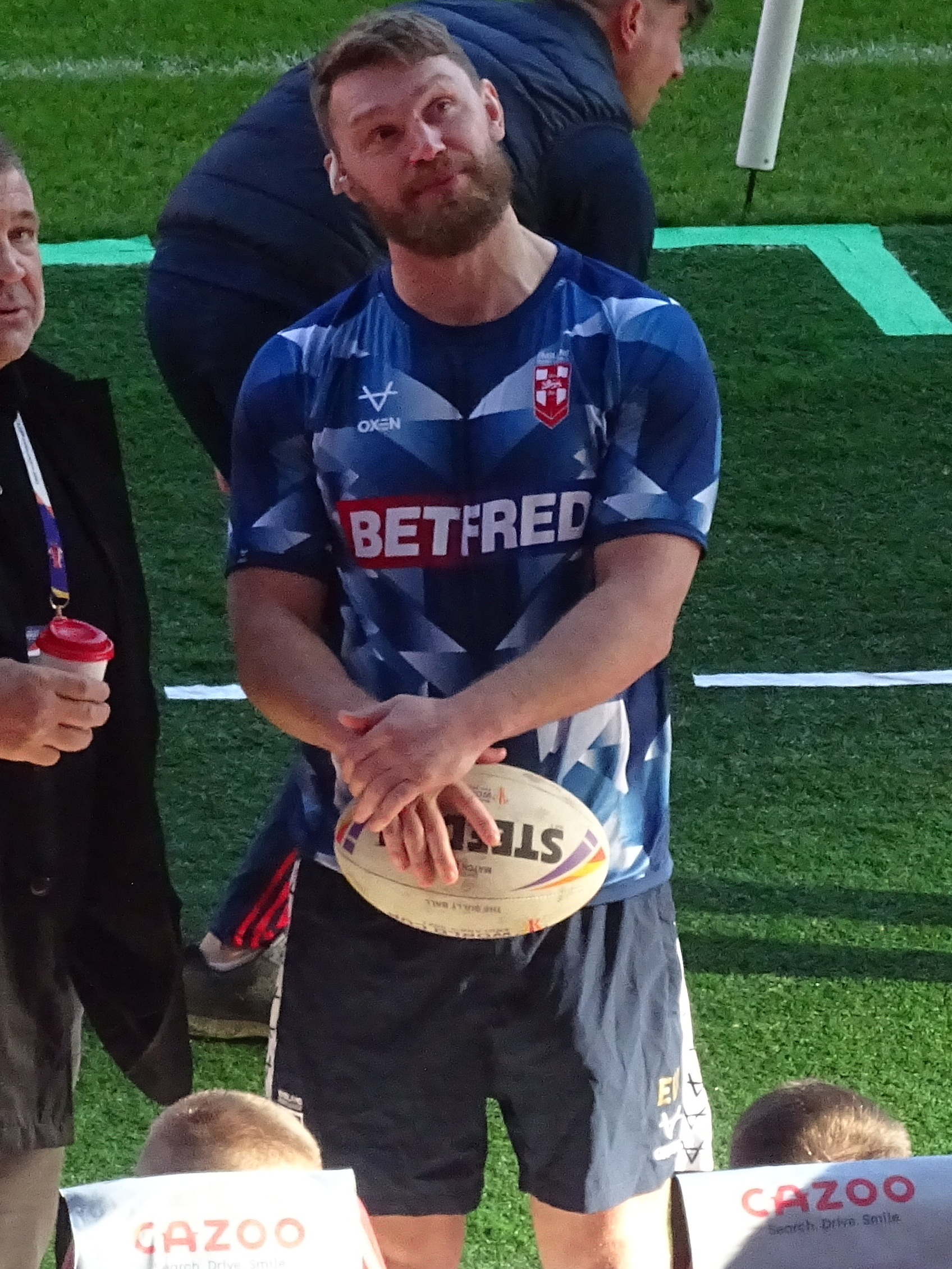

Personal information
- Full name: Elliott James Whitehead
- Born: 4 September 1989 (age 37) Bradford, England
- Height: 189 cm (6 ft 2 in)
- Weight: 105 kg (16 st 7 lb)

Playing information
- Position: Second-row
Club
Years	Team	Pld	T	G	FG	P
2009–13	Bradford Bulls	109	39	0	0	156
2013–15	Catalans Dragons	68	32	0	0	128
2016–24	Canberra Raiders	205	44	0	0	176
2025	Catalans Dragons	13	1	0	0	4
	Total	395	116	0	0	464
Representative
Years	Team	Pld	T	G	FG	P
2014–23	England	27	12	0	0	48
2019	Great Britain	4	0	0	0	0
- Source: As of 31 October 2025

Elliott Whitehead (born 4 September 1989) is an English former professional rugby league footballer who last played as a second-row forward for the Catalans Dragons in the Super League, and also appeared for England and Great Britain at international level.

He previously played for the Bradford Bulls in the Super League and the Canberra Raiders in the NRL.

== Background ==
Whitehead was born in Bradford, West Yorkshire, England].

== Club career ==
=== Bradford ===
Whitehead played junior rugby league for West Bowling before being signed by his hometown professional club Bradford Bulls in 2005.

Whitehead made his Super League début in June 2009 against Wakefield Trinity, and went on to make seven appearances in the final ten games of the season. He scored his first try for Bradford in July 2009 against Crusaders, and was rewarded with an improved contract with the club.

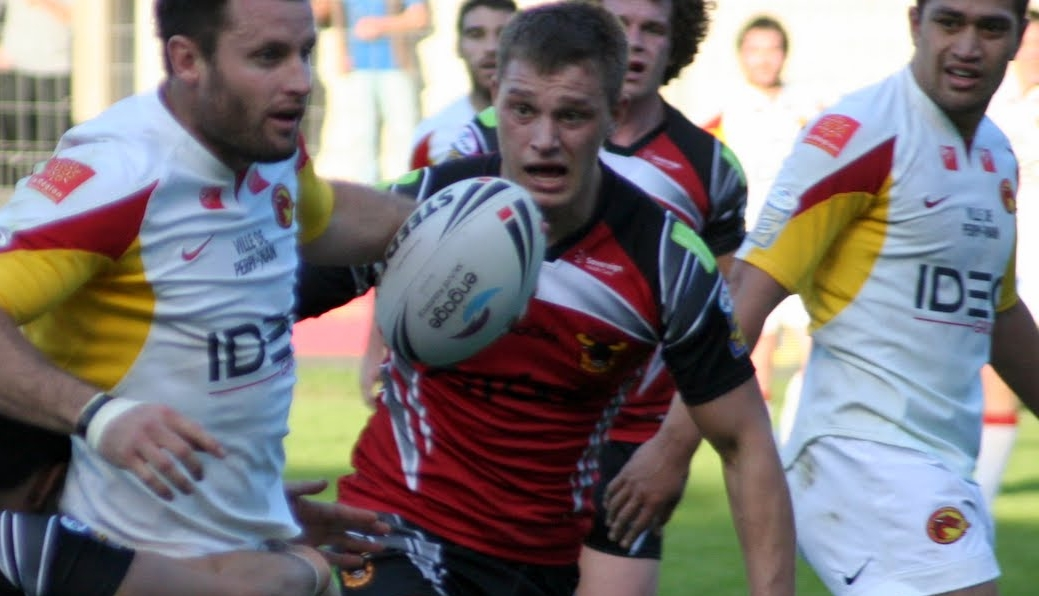
Whitehead playing for the Bradford Bulls in 2010

In the 2010 season, Whitehead featured in 26 consecutive games from Round 2 (St. Helens) to Round 27 (Wigan). He also played in the Challenge Cup games against Dewsbury, Leigh and Warrington. Whitehead scored against Castleford (2 tries), Hull Kingston Rovers (1 try), Leeds (1 try), Crusaders (1 try), Harlequins RL (1 try), Salford (1 try), Wakefield Trinity (1 try) and Dewsbury (1 try).

In the 2011 season, Whitehead featured in 24 consecutive games from Round 1 (Leeds) to Round 24 (Hull Kingston Rovers). He has also featured in the Challenge Cup games against Halifax and Wigan. He scored tries against Leeds (3 tries), Wigan (2 tries), Warrington (1 try), Harlequins RL (1 try) and Halifax (1 try). In August 2011, Whitehead received a five-game suspension after being charged with biting Hull Kingston Rovers forward Jordan Cox.

In the 2012 season, Whitehead missed Round 1 due to suspension. Whitehead featured in 26 consecutive games from Round 2 (Castleford) to Round 27 (Catalans Dragons). He also featured in the Challenge Cup against Doncaster and Warrington. Whitehead scored tries against Wakefield Trinity (4 tries), St. Helens (1 try), Salford (1 try), Doncaster (3 tries), Leeds (2 tries), Wigan (1 try), London Broncos (1 try), Warrington (1 try) and Hull Kingston Rovers (1 try). In March 2012, Whitehead signed a new five-year contract with the club.

In the 2013 season, Whitehead featured in 17 consecutive games from Round 1 (Wakefield Trinity) to Round 17 (Hull Kingston Rovers). Whitehead featured in the Challenge Cup against Rochdale Hornets and London Broncos. Elliott scored against Widnes (1 try), London Broncos (2 tries) and Rochdale Hornets (3 tries). In June 2013, Whitehead handed in a transfer request, and was placed on indefinite leave by head coach Francis Cummins. After turning down an offer from Salford, he was signed by Catalans Dragons for an undisclosed fee.

=== Catalans Dragons ===
Whitehead signed a two-and-a-half-year deal with Catalans, and he made his début for the club in July 2013 against London Broncos. He played eight games for the club during the season, and featured in the playoffs against Hull FC. He scored his first try for the club against Salford.

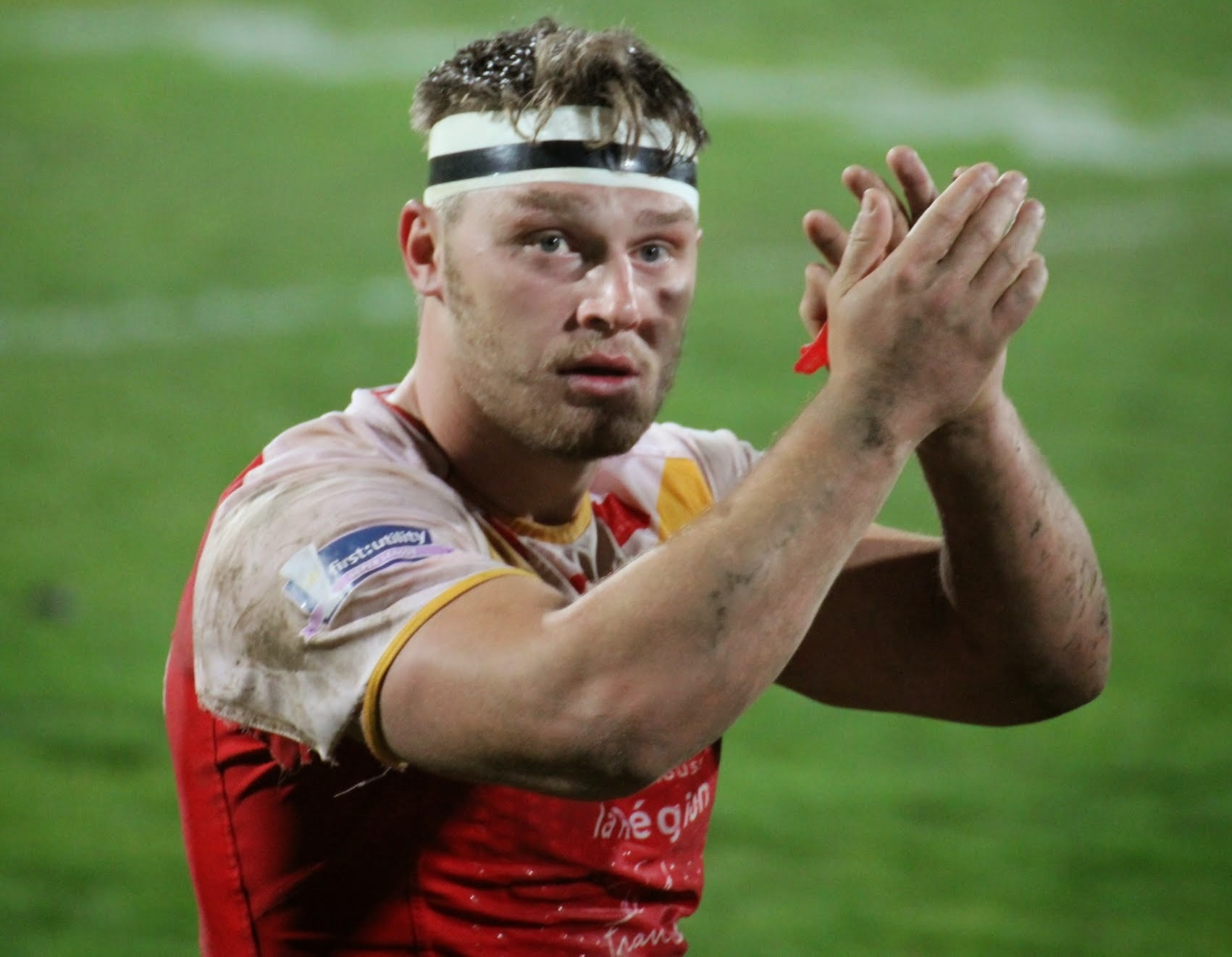
Whitehead playing for Catalans in 2014

In the 2014 season, Whitehead featured in Round 1 (Hull F.C.) to Round 6 (Huddersfield). Elliot featured in Round 8 (Widnes) to Round 10 (Hull Kingston Rovers) and then in Round 13 (London Broncos) to Round 25 (London Broncos). Elliott next played in Round 27 (Castleford). He played in the Elimination Playoff (Leeds). Whitehead also featured in Round 5 (Bradford Bulls) of the Challenge Cup. He scored against Hull F.C. (1 try), Wakefield Trinity (5 tries), Huddersfield (1 try), Widnes (3 tries), Hull Kingston Rovers (2 tries), London Broncos (2 tries), Bradford Bulls (2 tries), Wigan (1 try) and Castleford (1 try).

In the 2015 season, Whitehead featured in Round 1 (St. Helens) to Super Eight 7 (Hull F.C.). Elliott played in the Challenge Cup in Round 6 (Featherstone Rovers) and the Quarter Final (Hull Kingston Rovers). He scored against Castleford (1 try), Salford (1 try), Leeds (3 tries), Wakefield Trinity (1 try), Hull Kingston Rovers (2 tries), Warrington (1 try), Widnes (2 tries) and Hull F.C. (1 try).

=== Canberra Raiders ===
On 8 April 2015, Whitehead signed a two-year contract with National Rugby League side Canberra Raiders starting in 2016. He made his début against Penrith Panthers, and went on to play 27 games and score 6 tries in his first season in the NRL.

In August 2016, he was given a contract extension until the end of 2018. Whitehead credits his ability to adapt to the Australian style of play on personal fitness guru Chris Anderson.

At the end of the 2017 season, Whitehead extended his contract with Canberra until the end of the 2020 season.

Whitehead made 27 appearances for Canberra in the 2019 NRL season as the club qualified for their first grand final in 25 years.

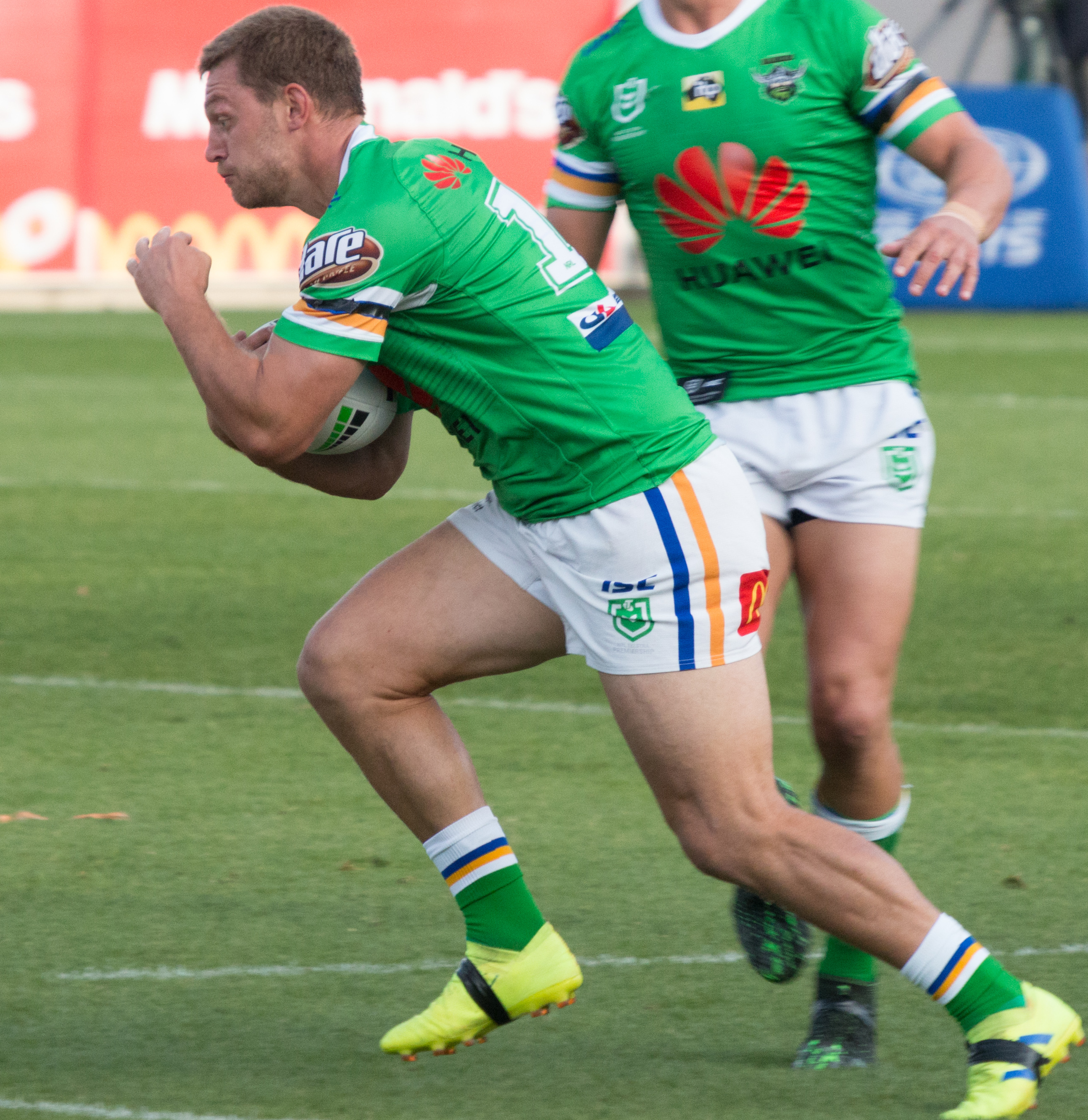
Whitehead playing for Canberra in 2019

Whitehead played in the 2019 NRL Grand Final at second-row as they were defeated 14-8 by the Sydney Roosters at ANZ Stadium.

Whitehead played 22 games for Canberra in the 2020 NRL season as the club fell one game short of another grand final appearance.

Whitehead played 21 games for Canberra in the 2021 NRL season which saw the club finish 10th on the table.

Whitehead played a total of 22 games for Canberra in the 2022 NRL season as the club finished 8th on the table and qualified for the finals. Whitehead played in both finals matches as Canberra were eliminated in the second week by Parramatta.

Whitehead played a total of 23 matches for Canberra in the 2023 NRL season as the club finished 8th on the table and qualified for the finals. Whitehead played in the clubs elimination finals loss against Newcastle. In round 9 of the 2024 NRL season, Whitehead came back into the Canberra team after a lengthy injury and scored two tries for the club in their comeback victory over Manly. Whitehead played a total of 16 matches for Canberra in his last season at the club as they finished 9th on the table.

=== Catalans Dragons (re-join) ===
On 11 Jul 2024 it was reported he had re-joined Catalans Dragons on a 1-year deal

On 29 Aug 2025 he announced his retirement from rugby league

== International career ==
In 2014, Whitehead was selected in England's 2014 Four Nations squad. He was selected in the 3rd game against New Zealand.

In 2015, Whitehead was selected in the England team again for the end-of-year test series against New Zealand. Before the series, Whitehead was part of the England team that took on France in a test match held in Leigh.

In 2016, Whitehead was selected in the 24-man England squad for the 2016 Four Nations. Before the tournament began, he featured in a test match against France.

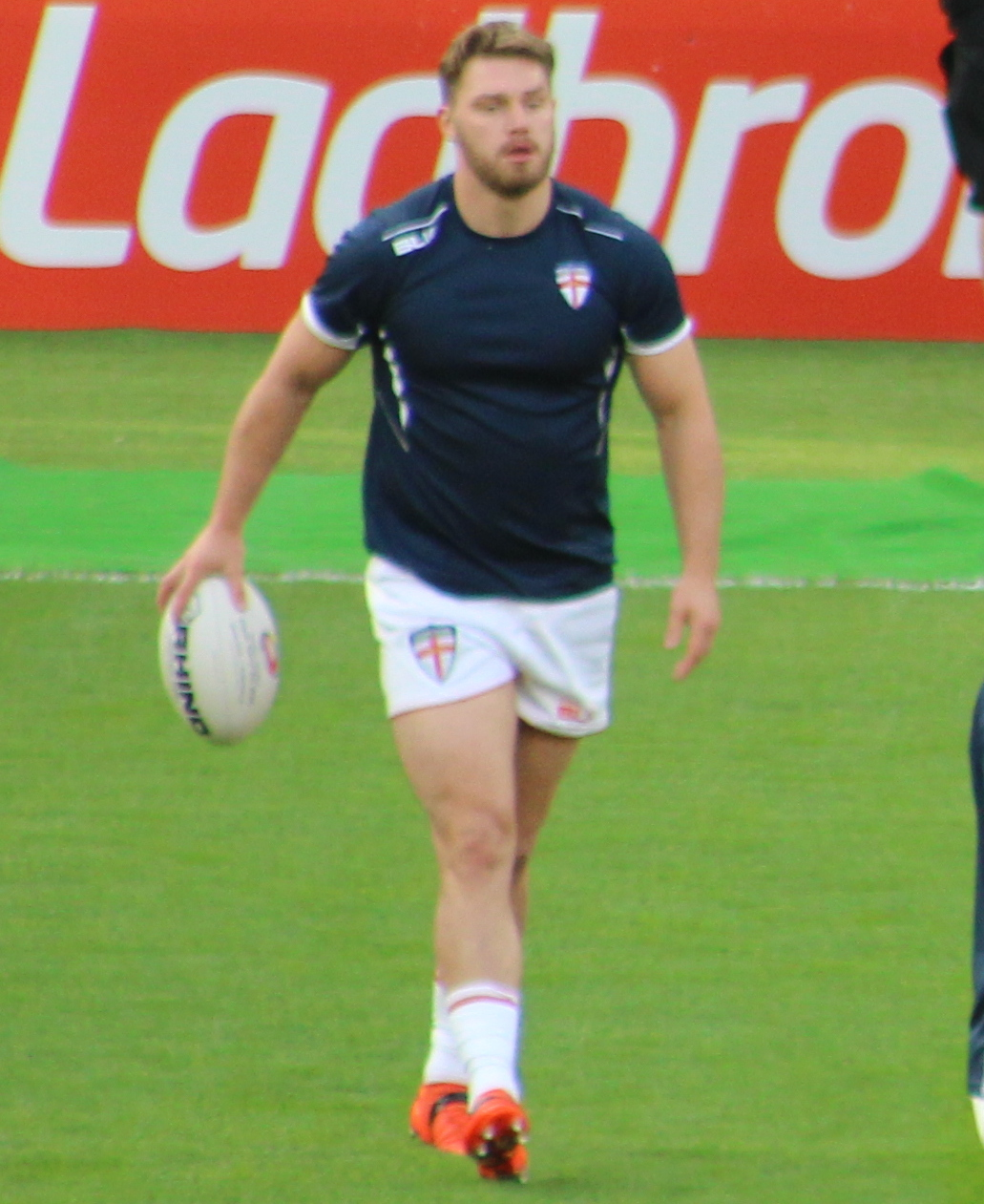
Whitehead warming up for England in 2016

In October 2017 he was selected in the England squad for the 2017 Rugby League World Cup.

In 2018 he was selected for England against France at the Leigh Sports Village.

He was selected in England 9s squad for the 2019 Rugby League World Cup 9s.

He was selected in squad for the 2019 Great Britain Lions tour of the Southern Hemisphere. He made his Great Britain test debut in the defeat by Tonga.

In October 2022 Whitehead was named in the England squad for the 2021 Rugby League World Cup. On 15 October 2022 he scored two tries for England in their opening match of the 2021 Rugby League World Cup against Samoa as England won the game 60-6.

== Statistics ==
Year	Team	Appearance	Tries	Goals	F/G	Points
2009	Bradford Bulls	7	1	0	0	4
2010	Bradford Bulls	29	9	0	0	36
2011	Bradford Bulls	26	8	0	0	32
2012	Bradford Bulls	28	15	0	0	60
2013	Bradford Bulls	19	6	0	0	24
2013	Catalans Dragons	8	1	0	0	4
2014	Catalans Dragons	25	18	0	0	72
2015	Catalans Dragons	32	12	0	0	48
2016	Canberra Raiders	27	6	0	0	24
2017	Canberra Raiders	23	5	0	0	20
2018	Canberra Raiders	24	10	0	0	40
2019	Canberra Raiders	27	3	0	0	12
2020	Canberra Raiders	22	5	0	0	20
2021	Canberra Raiders	21	4	0	0	16
2022	Canberra Raiders	22	3	0	0	12
2023	Canberra Raiders	23	3	0	0	12
2024	Canberra Raiders	16	5			20
2025	Catalans Dragons					
	Total	382	115	0	0	460

*denotes season still competing
