= Corey Horsburgh =

Australian rugby league footballer (born 1998)

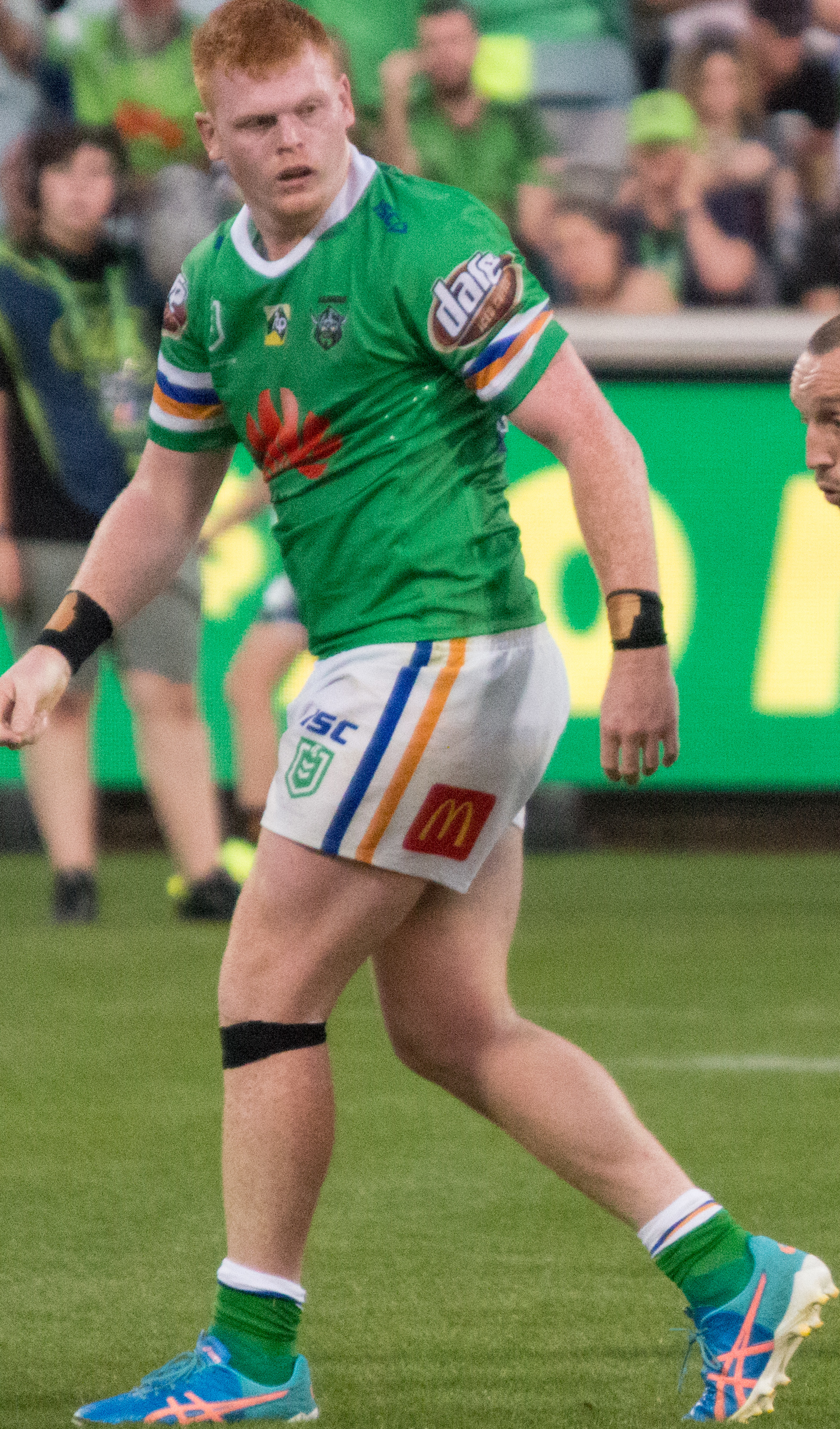

Personal information
- Born: 5 January 1998 (age 28) Caboolture, Queensland, Australia
- Height: 189 cm (6 ft 2 in)
- Weight: 105 kg (16 st 7 lb)

Playing information
- Position: Lock, Prop
Club
Years	Team	Pld	T	G	FG	P
2019–26	Canberra Raiders	132	10	0	0	40
2021(loan)	→ Canterbury Bulldogs	2	0	0	0	0
2027–	Perth Bears	0	0	0	0	0
	Total	134	10	0	0	40
Representative
Years	Team	Pld	T	G	FG	P
2023	Queensland	1	0	0	0	0
2025	Prime Minister's XIII	1	0	0	0	0
- Source: As of 16 November 2026

Corey Horsburgh (born 5 January 1998) is an Australian rugby league footballer who primarily plays as a lock or prop for the Perth Bears in the National Rugby League (NRL).

Horsburgh played for Queensland Maroons at State of Origin level in 2023.

== Background ==
Horsburgh was born in Caboolture, Queensland, Australia. Raised in Caboolture South he played Australian rules football and was a 2014 junior premiership player for the Caboolture Lions and was a member of the Brisbane Lions Academy from age 14 to 16. At age 16 he began also playing rugby league with the Caboolture Snakes before moving to the Redcliffe Dolphins where he won a 2014 junior premiership. He represented the QLD Maroons at junior level, playing in the U20s side in 2018. Whilst playing for the North Queensland NYC team in 2016, he represented Queensland in their U18s game playing Lock, losing 0-26. He also played local league in Townsville for Norths Devils.

== Playing career ==
=== 2018–2019 ===
After previously being under development at North Queensland, he signed a contract to play for the Canberra Raiders and spent his first year, 2018, under development. After being upgraded to a top 30 contract, he made his debut in round 1 of the 2019 NRL season against the Gold Coast Titans.

Horsburgh made 22 appearances for Canberra in the 2019 NRL season as the club reached the grand final for the first time in 25 years. Horsburgh played from the bench in the club's 2019 NRL Grand Final defeat against the Sydney Roosters at Stadium Australia.

On 7 October 2019, Horsburgh was named at prop for the U23 Junior Australian side.

=== 2020 ===
In round 7 of the 2020 NRL season, Horsburgh was taken from the field after twisting his knee in a tackle made by Parramatta Eels player Ryan Matterson. An emotional Horsburgh walked to the sideline in tears and raised his middle fingers to the empty stand at Western Sydney Stadium. Canberra would go on to lose the match 25-24 in golden point extra-time.

On 29 June 2020, Horsburgh missed the rest of the season with a Lisfranc foot injury sustained during Canberra's loss to Parramatta. He finished his second season of NRL playing in 6 matches, starting in all of them.

=== 2021 ===
Horsburgh scored his first NRL try against the Sydney Roosters in round 12 of the 2021 NRL season. On 10 August 2021, Horsburgh signed a two-week loan deal to join bottom placed Canterbury Bulldogs to help their injury and suspension crisis.

Horsburgh made his club debut for Canterbury in round 22 against the New Zealand Warriors which ended in a 24-10 defeat.

=== 2022 ===
Horsburgh returned to the Canberra club at the start of the 2022 NRL season. Horsburgh played 22 games for Canberra in the 2022 NRL season including both of the clubs finals matches.

=== 2023 ===
In round 3 of the 2023 NRL season, Horsburgh scored two tries for Canberra in a 24-20 victory over Cronulla. Following Canberra's round 26 loss to Brisbane, Horsburgh was placed on report for a shoulder charge during the clubs loss. On 30 August, Horsburgh was suspended for a total of four matches. Horsburgh played a total of 22 matches for Canberra in the 2023 NRL season as the club finished 8th on the table and qualified for the finals.

=== 2024 ===
In round 17 of the 2024 NSW Cup season, Horsburgh was sent off after he was seen headbutting and then punching New Zealand Warriors player Jacob Laban. In round 27 of the 2024 NRL season, Horsburgh scored the winning try for Canberra with two minutes remaining as they defeated St. George Illawarra 26-24.

=== 2025 ===
Horsburgh played 25 matches for Canberra in the 2025 NRL season as the club claimed the Minor Premiership. Horsburgh played in both finals matches as Canberra went out in straight sets losing to both Brisbane and Cronulla.

On 12 October 2025 he made his debut for the Prime Minister's XIII in the 28-10 win over PNG Prime Minister's XIII in Port Moresby

=== 2026 ===
In round 23 of the 2026 NRL season, Horsburgh was sin binned for striking Newcastle's Dane Gagai after Canberra were awarded a penalty. The decision was reversed in Newcastle's favour and due to it being late in the match it cost Canberra the chance to potentially win the game which would have kept their chance of making the finals alive. In the post match press conference, Canberra head coach said of the incident "“It should have been 28-all, and there’s a brain explosion when we got a penalty, It was a f--king brain explosion and (we) lost the opportunity". The following week, Horsburgh was left out of the Canberra team to face Cronulla. On 22 August 2026, Horsburgh was one of six Canberra Raiders that would depart at the end of the season. On 23 August 2026, the Perth Bears announced that Horsburgh had signed a three-year deal starting in 2027.

== Statistics ==
Year	Team	Games	Tries	Pts
2019	Canberra Raiders	22		
2020	Canberra Raiders	6		
2021	Canberra Raiders	8	1	4
2021	→ Canterbury-Bankstown Bulldogs (loan)	2		
2022	Canberra Raiders	22	1	4
2023	Canberra Raiders	24	3	12
2024	Canberra Raiders	5	1	4
2025	Canberra Raiders	25	2	8
2026	Canberra Raiders	9	1	4
2027	Perth Bears			
	Totals	134	10	40

== Controversy ==
On 2 February 2021, it was revealed that Horsburgh had been pulled over by police on 3 January 2021 and charged with low-range drink driving. The matter was later passed onto the NRL Integrity Unit.
