= Matt Frawley =

Australian rugby league footballer

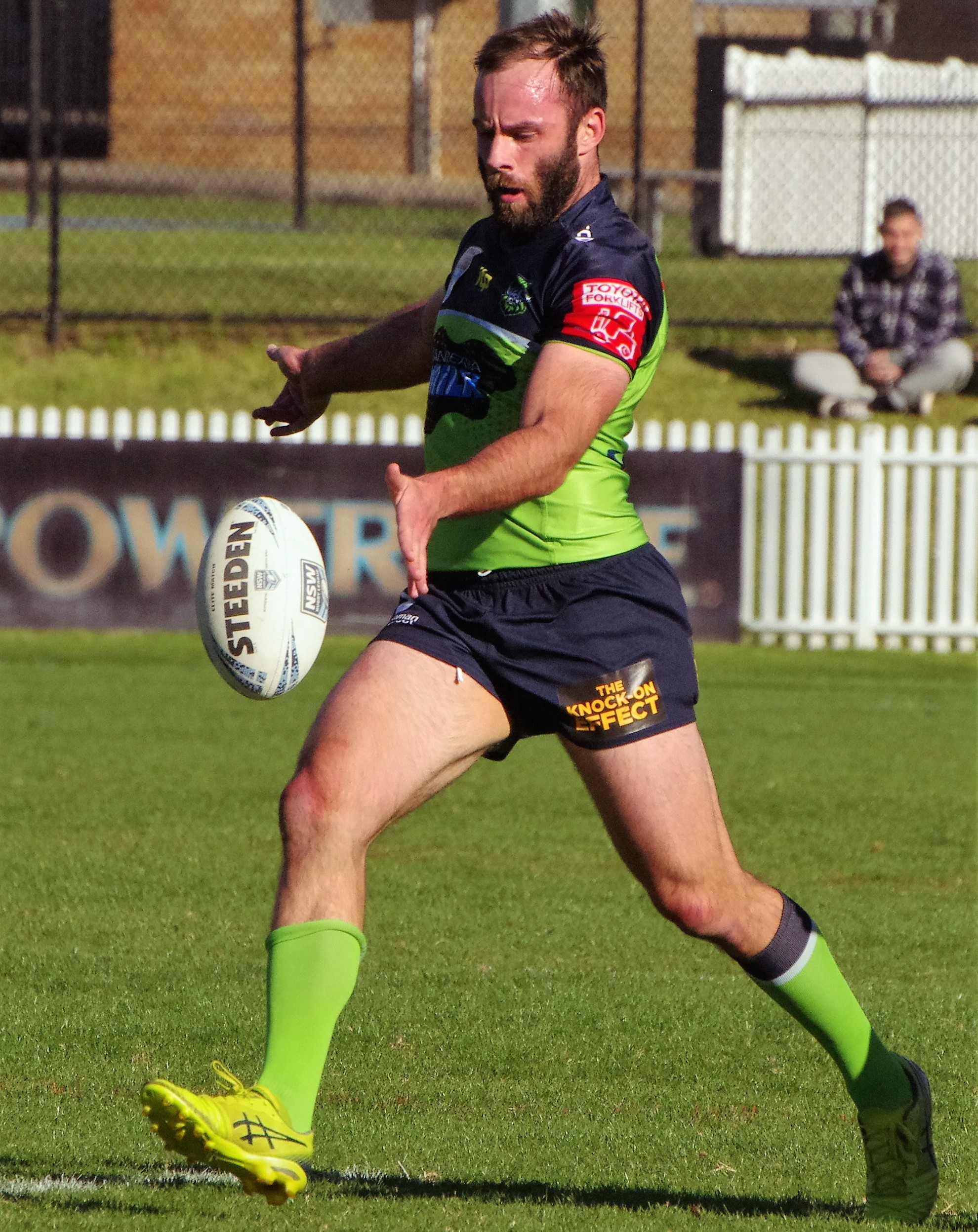

Personal information
- Full name: Matthew Frawley
- Born: 24 December 1994 (age 31) Canberra, Australian Capital Territory, Australia
- Height: 185 cm (6 ft 1 in)
- Weight: 91 kg (14 st 5 lb)

Playing information
- Position: Scrum-half, Stand-off, Hooker
Club
Years	Team	Pld	T	G	FG	P
2017–18	Canterbury Bulldogs	31	6	0	0	24
2019	Huddersfield Giants	22	4	0	0	16
2020–23	Canberra Raiders	22	5	0	1	22
2024–25	Leeds Rhinos	32	7	0	0	28
2025(loan)	→ Huddersfield Giants	8	0	0	0	0
	Total	115	22	0	1	90
- Source: As of 29 October 2026

Matthew Frawley (born 24 December 1994) is an Australian rugby league footballer who currently plays as a Stand-off, Scrum-half or hooker for RC Albi in the Super XIII.

Frawley previously played for the Canterbury-Bankstown Bulldogs in the NRL and the Huddersfield Giants and Leeds Rhinos in the Super League.

== Background ==
Frawley was born in Canberra, ACT, Australia. Frawley is of Irish heritage.

Frawley played his junior rugby league for the Belconnen United Sharks and West Belconnen Warriors, before being signed by the Canberra Raiders.

== Playing career ==
=== Early career ===
In 2013 and 2014, Frawley played for the Canberra Raiders' NYC team, captaining the side in 2014. Frawley had doubts about ever making the NRL as Canberra signed Blake Austin.

Frawley started selling retail clothes in Canberra before signing a 2-year contract with the Canterbury-Bankstown Bulldogs that began in 2015.

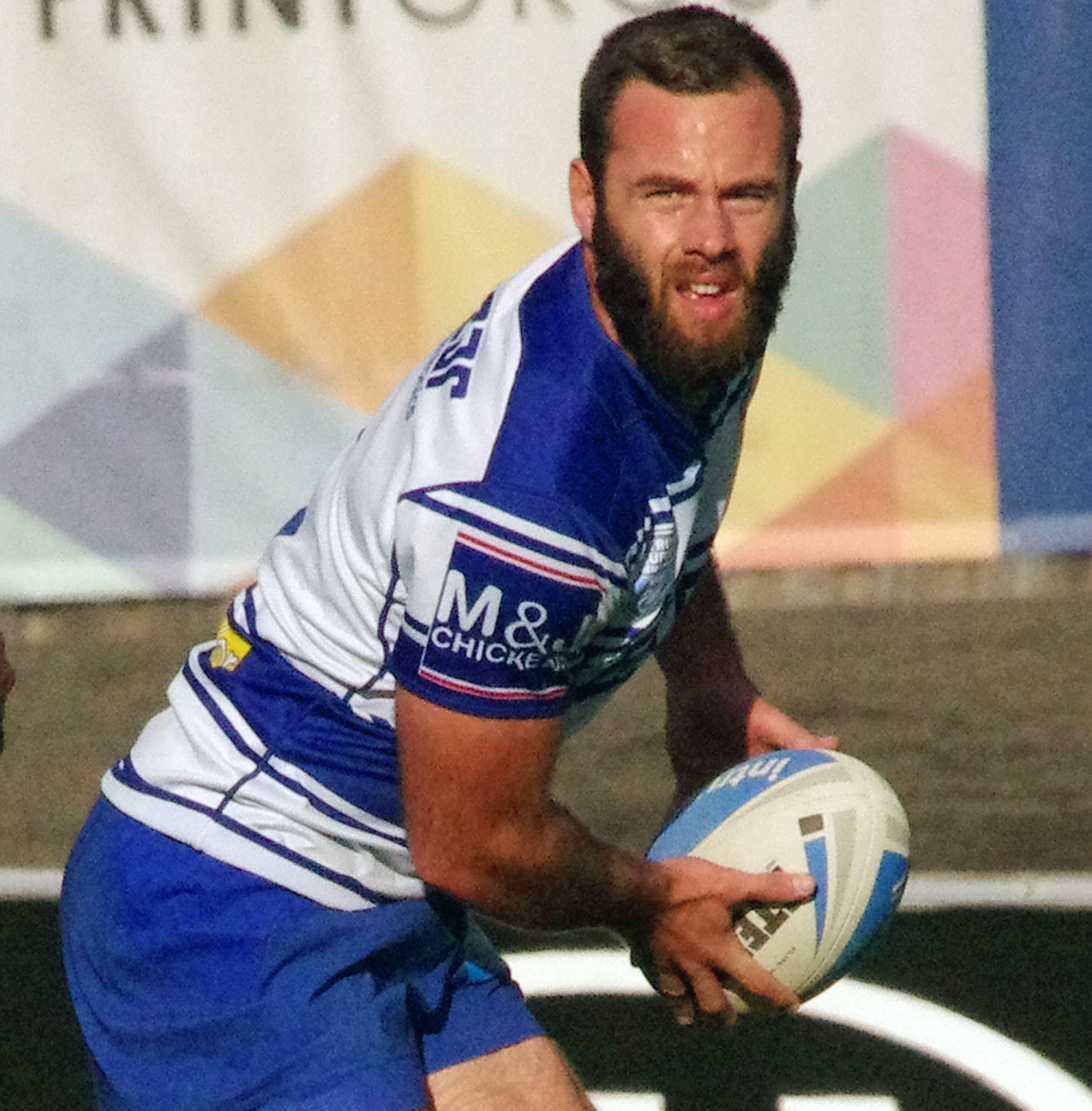
Frawley playing for the Canterbury Bulldogs in 2016

=== 2017 ===
In round 5 of the 2017 NRL season, Frawley got the call up from coach Des Hasler and made his NRL debut for Canterbury against the Brisbane Broncos, due to incumbent half Moses Mbye being suspended for one-match. Frawley was named in the number 6 jersey.

In his second game in the NRL, he was originally named in the number 20 jersey, coach Des Hasler moved him onto the bench in place of Raymond Faitala-Mariner. He came on late in the first half in place of injured Brad Abbey, and in the first set of the second half scored a try, his first in the NRL. He also came up with a try assist, with a cut out pass to send Josh Morris over in the corner.

In round 6 against Newcastle Knights, Frawley was named in the number 20 jersey, he was later named on the bench in place of Raymond Faitala-Mariner. Frawley didn't get on the field in the first half, though when Brad Abbey fell down with injury, Frawley came on to the field in the second half. He scored a try. He dummied multiple times and put the Bulldogs in the lead. The Bulldogs went on to win 22-12.

In round 9, Frawley played his former side, Canberra with Canterbury winning the game 16-10. He had to take control as Josh Reynolds got injured, and was ruled out until round 14.

Frawley scored his second career try in Round 11 against the Sydney Roosters, almost completing his team's comeback.

=== 2018 ===
Frawley started the 2018 season as Canterbury's first choice five-eighth, but was demoted to reserve grade by coach Dean Pay after 2 games. After spending 7 weeks in reserve grade, Frawley was recalled to Canterbury's NRL side for their round 9 game against Brisbane. On 27 August, Frawley was one of the players announced to be departing the club at the end of the season after his contract was not renewed. It was announced on 28 October 2018 that Frawley had signed for Huddersfield in the Super League.

=== 2019 ===
On 10 December, it was announced that Frawley had signed a one-year development contract with NRL side Canberra for the 2020 NRL season.

=== 2020 ===
In round 20 of the 2020 NRL season, Frawley made and scored a try on his debut for the Canberra Raiders in the role of five-eighth, against Cronulla-Sutherland in their final game of the 2020 regular season.

=== 2021 ===
Frawley made only five appearances for Canberra in the 2021 NRL season which saw the club finish a disappointing 10th on the table.

=== 2022 ===
Frawley made eight appearances for Canberra in the 2022 NRL season as the club finished 8th on the table and qualified for the finals. Frawley did not play in either of Canberra's finals matches.

=== 2023 ===
Frawley kicked his first two-point field goal (a field goal kicked from outside the opposition's 40-metre zone) in the round 4 match against Newcastle. Frawley played a total of eight games for Canberra in the 2023 NRL season including the clubs elimination finals loss to Newcastle. On 10 September, it was announced that Frawley would be joining English side Leeds on a two-year deal starting in 2024.

=== 2024 ===
Frawley played 25 games for Leeds in the 2024 Super League which saw the club finish 8th on the table.

=== 2025 ===
On 18 June 2025 it was reported that he had signed for Huddersfield Giants in the Super League on one-month loan On 12 September, Frawley announced his retirement .

=== 2026 ===
On 25 October 2026 it was reported that he had signed for RC Albi in the Super XIII for the 2026/27 season

== Career statistics ==
Season	Team	Games	Tries	G	FG	Pts
2017	Canterbury-Bankstown Bulldogs	18	3	0	0	12
2018	Canterbury-Bankstown Bulldogs	13	3	0	0	12
2019	Huddersfield Giants	22	4	0	0	16
2020	Canberra Raiders	1	1	0	0	4
2021	Canberra Raiders	5	0	0	0	0
2022	Canberra Raiders	8	1	0	0	4
2023	Canberra Raiders	8	3	0	1 (Note: Includes 1 two point field goal.)	14
2024	Leeds Rhinos	25	6	0	0	24
2025	Leeds Rhinos	3	1	0	0	4
2025	→ Huddersfield Giants (loan)	8				
	Totals:	115	22	0	1	90
