= 2018 Canberra Raiders season =

- NRL Rank: 10th
- 2018 record: Wins: 10; draws: 0; losses: 14
- Points scored: For: 563; against: 540

Team information
- CEO: Don Furner Jr.
- Coach: Ricky Stuart (5th season)
- Captain: Jarrod Croker (4th season)
- Stadium: GIO Stadium - 25,011

Top scorers
- Tries: Joseph Leilua (14)
- Goals: Jarrod Croker (63)
- Points: Jarrod Croker (154)
Home colours	Away colours
← 2017	List of seasons	2019 →

The 2018 Canberra Raiders season was the 37th in the club's history. Coached by Ricky Stuart and captained by Jarrod Croker, the Raiders completed the NRL's 2018 Telstra Premiership in 10th place and did not qualify for the finals.

== Squad ==
Canberra Raiders 2018 Squad
First team squad			Coaching staff
Brad Abbey – FB; Blake Austin – FE, HB, FB; Luke Bateman – LK; Shannon Boyd – PR; Nick Cotric – WG, CE, FB; Jarrod Croker (c) – CE (gk); Craig Garvey – HK; Charlie Gubb – PR; Emre Guler – PR, LK; Setefano Hala – PR; Siliva Havili – HK, LK	Ata Hingano – FE, HB; Josh Hodgson (vc) – HK; Corey Horsburgh – LK, PR, SR; Royce Hunt – PR; Liam Knight – SR, LK; Sebastian Kris – CE; Joseph Leilua – CE; Dunamis Lui – LK, PR, SR; Makahesi Makatoa – SR, LK, PR; Jack Murchie – SR, LK; Michael Oldfield – WG, FB	Josh Papalii – SR, LK; Junior Paulo – PR; Jordan Rapana – WG, FB; Mikaele Ravalawa – WG, CE; Paul Roache – FE, HB; Aidan Sezer (gk) – HB, FE; Iosia Soliola – LK, SR, PR; Joseph Tapine – SR, LK; Elliott Whitehead – SR, LK, CE; Jack Wighton – FB, CE, WG; Sam Williams – HB, FE	Head coach: Ricky Stuart; Assistant coaches: Brett White (assistant coach); Mick Crawley (assistant coach); Legend: (c) Captain(s); (vc) Vice-captain(s); Injured; (gk) Goal kicker; Updated: 16 July 2018; Source(s): Raiders Squad

=== Player Transfers ===
==== Gains ====
Player	Signed from	Until End Of	Ref
Brad Abbey	Canterbury-Bankstown Bulldogs	2019	
Bill Cullen	Central Queensland Capras (Mid Season)	2018	
Masivesi Dakuwaqa	Rugby Union (Mid Season)	2018	
Craig Garvey	Canterbury-Bankstown Bulldogs	2018	
Charlie Gubb	New Zealand Warriors	2019	
Stefano Hala	Penrith Panthers	2019	
Siliva Havili	St George Illawarra Dragons	2018	
Ata Hingano	New Zealand Warriors	2019	
Liam Knight	Sydney Roosters (Mid Season)	2019	
Sitiveni Moceidreke	South Sydney Rabbitohs	2018	
Michael Oldfield	Penrith Panthers (Mid Season)	2019	
Sam Williams	Wakefield Trinity	2019	

==== Loses ====
Player	Signed To	Until End Of	Ref
Kurt Baptiste	Leigh Centurions	2018	
Adam Clydsdale	Retirement		
Lachlan Croker	Manly Warringah Sea Eagles	2018	
Jeff Lima	Retirement		
Kato Ottio	Widnes Vikings		
Clay Priest	Canterbury-Bankstown Bulldogs	2019	
Zac Santo	New Zealand Warriors (Mid Season)	2018	
Scott Sorensen	Cronulla-Sutherland Sharks	2019	
David Taylor	Toronto Wolfpack	2020	
Jordan Turner	Huddersfield Giants (Mid Season)	2020	

== Fixtures ==
=== Trial Matches ===
Saturday, 17 February
5:00pm

Canterbury-Bankstown Bulldogs	16 – 12	Canberra Raiders
Tries: Michael Lichaa 1 Greg Eastwood 1 Asipeli Fine 1 Goals: Moses Mbye 2/2	1st: 12 – 0; 2nd: 4 – 12	Tries: 1 Sia Soliola; 1 Makahesi Makatoa; Goals: 1/1 Aidan Sezer; 1/1 Blake Austin

Sunshine Coast Stadium, Kawana Waters
Referee: Gavin Badger, Chris Butler

Team lists:

FB	1	Moses Mbye
WG	2	Brett Morris
CE	3	Josh Morris
CE	4	William Hopoate
WG	5	Marcelo Montoya
FE	6	Matt Frawley
HB	7	Kieran Foran
PR	8	Lachlan Burr
HK	9	Michael Lichaa
PR	10	David Klemmer
SR	11	Josh Jackson (c)
SR	12	Raymond Faitala-Mariner
LK	13	Danny Fualalo
Substitutes:
IC	14	Jack Nelson
IC	15	Greg Eastwood
IC	16	Adam Elliott
IC	17	Jeremy Marshall-King
IC	19	Francis Tualau
IC	20	Tom Carr
IC	21	Josh Cleeland
IC	22	Jarred Anderson
IC	23	Asipeli Fine
IC	24	Josh Bergamin
IC	25	Lachlan Lewis
IC	26	Kerrod Holland
IC	27	Zac Woolford
IC	28	Rhyse Martin
IC	29	Jayden Okunbor
IC	30	Ofahiki Ogden
IC	31	Renouf To'omaga
IC	32	John Olive
Coach:
Dean Pay

FB	1	Jack Wighton
WG	2	Nick Cotric
CE	3	Jarrod Croker (c)
CE	4	Joseph Leilua
WG	5	Jordan Rapana
FE	6	Blake Austin
HB	7	Aidan Sezer
PR	8	Junior Paulo
HK	9	Siliva Havili
PR	10	Shannon Boyd
SR	11	Josh Papalii
SR	12	Joseph Tapine
LK	13	Elliott Whitehead
Substitutes:
IC	14	Sam Williams, Craig Garvey
IC	15	Luke Bateman
IC	16	Royce Hunt, Charlie Gubb
IC	17	Sia Soliola, Dunamis Lui
IC	18	Brad Abbey, Liam Knight
IC	19	Makahesi Makatoa
IC	20	Jack Murchie, Paul Roache, Mikaele Ravalawa, Sitiveni Moceidreke
IC	21	Sebastian Kris
IC	22	Emre Guler, Ed Murphy
Coach:
Ricky Stuart

=== NRL ===
==== Round 1 ====
Sunday, 11 March
6:30pm

Gold Coast Titans	30 – 28	Canberra Raiders
Tries: Kevin Proctor (14') 1 Kane Elgey (35') 1 Phillip Sami (46') 1 Dale Copley (54') 1 Konrad Hurrell (79') 1 Goals: Michael Gordon 5/6 (16', 37', 48', 62' pen, 80')	1st: 12 – 24; 2nd: 18 – 4	Tries: 1 (3') Siliva Havili; 1 (8') Jack Wighton; 1 (11') Elliott Whitehead; 1 (26') Junior Paulo; 1 (67') Joseph Leilua; Goals: 3/4 Jarrod Croker (5', 9', 12'); 1/1 Aidan Sezer (27')

Cbus Super Stadium, Gold Coast
Attendance: 10,238
Referee: Henry Perenara, Dave Munro
Player of the Match: Ashley Taylor

Team lists:

FB	1	Michael Gordon
WG	2	Anthony Don
CE	3	Dale Copley
CE	4	Konrad Hurrell
WG	5	Phillip Sami
FE	6	Kane Elgey
HB	7	Ashley Taylor
PR	8	Jai Arrow
HK	9	Nathan Peats
PR	10	Leilani Latu
SR	11	Kevin Proctor
SR	12	Ryan James (c)
LK	13	Bryce Cartwright
Substitutes:
IC	14	Mitch Rein
IC	15	Max King
IC	16	Will Matthews
IC	17	Morgan Boyle
Coach:
Garth Brennan

FB	1	Jack Wighton
WG	2	Nick Cotric
CE	3	Jarrod Croker (c)
CE	4	Joseph Leilua
WG	5	Jordan Rapana
FE	14	Blake Austin
HB	7	Sam Williams
PR	17	Sia Soliola
HK	9	Siliva Havili
PR	10	Shannon Boyd
SR	11	Josh Papalii
SR	12	Joseph Tapine
LK	13	Elliott Whitehead
Substitutes:
IC	6	Aidan Sezer
IC	8	Junior Paulo
IC	15	Luke Bateman
IC	16	Dunamis Lui
Coach:
Ricky Stuart

==== Round 2 ====
Sunday, 18 March
6:30pm

Canberra Raiders	28 – 30	Newcastle Knights
Tries: Elliott Whitehead (31', 44') 2 Jordan Rapana (15') 1 Jarrod Croker (60') 1 Goals: Jarrod Croker 6/7 (17', 20' pen, 40' pen, 46', 56' pen, 62')	1st: 14 – 14; 2nd: 14 – 16	Tries: 1 (10') Aidan Guerra; 1 (25') Lachlan Fitzgibbon; 1 (48') Tautau Moga; 1 (64') Connor Watson; 1 (73') Sione Mata'utia; Goals: 5/6 Kalyn Ponga (12', 27', 37' pen, 49', 65')

GIO Stadium, Canberra
Attendance: 12,626
Referee: Ashley Klein, Matt Noyen
Player of the Match: Kalyn Ponga

Team lists:

FB	1	Jack Wighton
WG	2	Nick Cotric
CE	3	Jarrod Croker (c)
CE	4	Joseph Leilua
WG	5	Jordan Rapana
FE	6	Blake Austin
HB	7	Sam Williams
PR	8	Sia Soliola
HK	9	Siliva Havili
PR	10	Shannon Boyd
SR	11	Josh Papalii
SR	12	Elliott Whitehead
LK	13	Luke Bateman
Substitutes:
IC	14	Aidan Sezer
IC	15	Junior Paulo
IC	16	Dunamis Lui
IC	17	Charlie Gubb
Coach:
Ricky Stuart

FB	1	Kalyn Ponga
WG	2	Shaun Kenny-Dowall
CE	3	Sione Mata'utia
CE	4	Tautau Moga
WG	5	Nathan Ross
FE	6	Connor Watson
HB	7	Mitchell Pearce (c)
PR	8	Herman Ese'ese
HK	9	Slade Griffin
PR	10	Jacob Lillyman
SR	11	Lachlan Fitzgibbon
SR	12	Aidan Guerra
LK	13	Mitchell Barnett
Substitutes:
IC	14	Brock Lamb
IC	15	Chris Heighington
IC	17	Daniel Saifiti
IC	19	Jacob Saifiti
Coach:
Nathan Brown

==== Round 3 ====
Saturday, 24 March
3:00pm

Canberra Raiders	19 – 20	New Zealand Warriors
Tries: Siliva Havili (7') 1 Elliott Whitehead (9') 1 Nick Cotric (43') 1 Goals: Jarrod Croker 3/4 (8', 11', 48' pen); Field Goals: Sam Williams (40') 1	1st: 13 – 6; 2nd: 6 – 14	Tries: 1 (14') Peta Hiku; 1 (47') Tohu Harris; 1 (76') Issac Luke; Goals: 3/3 Shaun Johnson (15', 59', 77'); Field Goals: 2 (79', 80') Shaun Johnson; Sin Bin: (7') Adam Blair

GIO Stadium, Canberra
Attendance: 11,963
Referee: Grant Atkins, Jon Stone
Player of the Match: Shaun Johnson

Team lists:

FB	1	Jack Wighton
WG	2	Nick Cotric
CE	3	Jarrod Croker (c)
CE	4	Joseph Leilua
WG	5	Jordan Rapana
FE	6	Aidan Sezer
HB	7	Sam Williams
PR	8	Sia Soliola
HK	9	Siliva Havili
PR	10	Shannon Boyd
SR	11	Josh Papalii
SR	12	Elliott Whitehead
LK	13	Luke Bateman
Substitutes:
IC	14	Blake Austin
IC	15	Junior Paulo
IC	16	Dunamis Lui
IC	17	Liam Knight
Coach:
Ricky Stuart

FB	1	Roger Tuivasa-Sheck (c)
WG	2	David Fusitu'a
CE	3	Peta Hiku
CE	4	Solomone Kata
WG	5	Ken Maumalo
FE	6	Blake Green
HB	7	Shaun Johnson
PR	8	James Gavet
HK	9	Issac Luke
PR	10	Adam Blair
SR	11	Leivaha Pulu
SR	12	Tohu Harris
LK	15	Agnatius Paasi
Substitutes:
IC	13	Ligi Sao
IC	14	Jazz Tevaga
IC	16	Sam Lisone
IC	17	Bunty Afoa
Coach:
Stephen Kearney

==== Round 4 ====
Saturday, 31 March
7:30pm

Manly Warringah Sea Eagles	32 – 16	Canberra Raiders
Tries: Matthew Wright (23', 63') 2 Jake Trbojevic (8') 1 Tom Trbojevic (11') 1 Daly Cherry-Evans (14') 1 Goals: Daly Cherry-Evans 6/8 (10', 13', 15', 18' pen, 33' pen, 50' pen)	1st: 26 – 6; 2nd: 6 – 10	Tries: 1 (4') Sia Soliola; 1 (53') Jarrod Croker; 1 (56') Jack Wighton; Goals: 2/3 Jarrod Croker (5', 57')

Lottoland, Sydney
Attendance: 9,362
Referee: Adam Gee, Tim Roby
Player of the Match: Tom Trbojevic

Team lists:

FB	1	Tom Trbojevic
WG	2	Matthew Wright
CE	3	Brad Parker
CE	4	Brian Kelly
WG	5	Akuila Uate
FE	6	Lachlan Croker
HB	7	Daly Cherry-Evans (c)
PR	8	Addin Fonua-Blake
HK	9	Apisai Koroisau
PR	10	Martin Taupau
SR	11	Joel Thompson
SR	12	Curtis Sironen
LK	13	Jake Trbojevic
Substitutes:
IC	14	Jackson Hastings
IC	15	Shaun Lane
IC	16	Lloyd Perrett
IC	17	Kelepi Tanginoa
Coach:
Trent Barrett

FB	1	Jack Wighton
WG	2	Nick Cotric
CE	3	Jarrod Croker (c)
CE	4	Joseph Leilua
WG	5	Jordan Rapana
FE	6	Aidan Sezer
HB	7	Sam Williams
PR	8	Sia Soliola
HK	9	Siliva Havili
PR	10	Shannon Boyd
SR	11	Josh Papalii
SR	17	Joseph Tapine
LK	12	Elliott Whitehead
Substitutes:
IC	13	Luke Bateman
IC	14	Ata Hingano
IC	15	Junior Paulo
IC	16	Dunamis Lui
Coach:
Ricky Stuart

==== Round 5 ====
Thursday, 5 April
7:50pm

Canberra Raiders	26 – 10	Canterbury-Bankstown Bulldogs
Tries: Joseph Leilua (10', 15') 2 Jarrod Croker (57', 64') 2 Goals: Jarrod Croker 5/6 (11', 17', 59', 72' pen, 79' pen)	1st: 12 – 0; 2nd: 14 – 10	Tries: 1 (52') Kieran Foran; 1 (80') Josh Morris; Goals: 1/2 Moses Mbye (54')

GIO Stadium, Canberra
Attendance: 11,800
Referee: Grant Atkins, Alan Shortall
Player of the Match: Aidan Sezer

Team lists:

FB	2	Nick Cotric
WG	19	Michael Oldfield
CE	3	Jarrod Croker (c)
CE	4	Joseph Leilua
WG	5	Jordan Rapana
FE	6	Aidan Sezer
HB	7	Sam Williams
PR	8	Sia Soliola
HK	9	Siliva Havili
PR	10	Junior Paulo
SR	11	Joseph Tapine
SR	12	Elliott Whitehead
LK	13	Luke Bateman
Substitutes:
IC	14	Ata Hingano
IC	15	Shannon Boyd
IC	16	Dunamis Lui
IC	17	Liam Knight
Coach:
Ricky Stuart

FB	1	Moses Mbye
WG	2	Brett Morris
CE	3	Josh Morris
CE	4	Will Hopoate
WG	5	Marcelo Montoya
FE	6	Jeremy Marshall-King
HB	7	Kieran Foran
PR	8	Aaron Woods
HK	9	Michael Lichaa
PR	10	David Klemmer
SR	11	Josh Jackson (c)
SR	12	Raymond Faitala-Mariner
LK	13	Adam Elliott
Substitutes:
IC	15	Danny Fualalo
IC	17	Kerrod Holland
IC	19	Greg Eastwood
IC	20	Asipeli Fine
Coach:
Dean Pay

==== Round 6 ====
Saturday, 14 April
7:30pm

Canberra Raiders	18 – 2	Parramatta Eels
Tries: Jordan Rapana (9') 1 Blake Austin (17') 1 Josh Papalii (52') 1 Goals: Jarrod Croker 3/4 (19', 45' pen, 53'); Sin Bin: Luke Bateman (69')	1st: 10 – 2; 2nd: 8 – 0	Goals: 1/1 Mitchell Moses (40' pen); Sin Bin: (55') Daniel Alvaro

GIO Stadium, Canberra
Attendance: 12,328
Referee: Matt Cecchin, Phil Henderson
Player of the Match: Siliva Havili

Team lists:

FB	1	Jack Wighton
WG	2	Nick Cotric
CE	3	Jarrod Croker (c)
CE	4	Joseph Leilua
WG	5	Jordan Rapana
FE	6	Blake Austin
HB	7	Aidan Sezer
PR	8	Sia Soliola
HK	9	Siliva Havili
PR	10	Junior Paulo
SR	11	Joseph Tapine
SR	12	Elliott Whitehead
LK	13	Luke Bateman
Substitutes:
IC	14	Ata Hingano
IC	15	Shannon Boyd
IC	16	Josh Papalii
IC	17	Dunamis Lui
Coach:
Ricky Stuart

FB	1	Clint Gutherson
WG	2	George Jennings
CE	3	Michael Jennings
CE	4	Kirisome Auva'a
WG	5	Bevan French
FE	6	Corey Norman
HB	7	Mitchell Moses
PR	8	Peni Terepo
HK	9	Kaysa Pritchard
PR	10	Tim Mannah (c)
SR	11	Manu Ma'u
SR	12	Tony Williams
LK	13	Tepai Moeroa
Substitutes:
IC	14	Beau Scott
IC	15	Kenny Edwards
IC	16	Daniel Alvaro
IC	17	Kane Evans
Coach:
Brad Arthur

==== Round 7 ====
Saturday, 21 April
3:00pm

South Sydney Rabbitohs	42 – 22	Canberra Raiders
Tries: Robert Jennings (14', 55') 2 Alex Johnston (3') 1 Cody Walker (7') 1 Greg Inglis (30') 1 Richard Kennar (52') 1 Jason Clark (62') 1 Goals: Adam Reynolds 7/9 (9', 16' 19' pen, 32', 48' pen, 53', 64')	1st: 24 – 12; 2nd: 18 – 10	Tries: 2 (40', 75') Elliott Whitehead; 1 (24') Nick Cotric; 1 (66') Jarrod Croker; Goals: 3/3 Jarrod Croker (25', 40', 76'); 0/1 Aidan Sezer; Sin Bin: (47') Jarrod Croker

Central Coast Stadium, Gosford
Attendance: 15,134
Referee: Adam Gee, Ziggy Przeklasa-Adamski
Player of the Match: Sam Burgess

Team lists:

FB	1	Alex Johnston
WG	2	Richard Kennar
CE	3	Greg Inglis (c)
CE	4	Dane Gagai
WG	5	Robert Jennings
FE	6	Cody Walker
HB	7	Adam Reynolds
PR	8	Thomas Burgess
HK	9	Damien Cook
PR	10	George Burgess
SR	11	John Sutton
SR	12	Angus Crichton
LK	13	Sam Burgess
Substitutes:
IC	15	Mark Nicholls
IC	16	Jason Clark
IC	17	Tevita Tatola
IC	19	Hymel Hunt
Coach:
Anthony Seibold

FB	1	Jack Wighton
WG	2	Nick Cotric
CE	3	Jarrod Croker (c)
CE	4	Joseph Leilua
WG	5	Jordan Rapana
FE	6	Blake Austin
HB	7	Aidan Sezer
PR	8	Sia Soliola
HK	9	Siliva Havili
PR	10	Junior Paulo
SR	11	Joseph Tapine
SR	12	Elliott Whitehead
LK	13	Luke Bateman
Substitutes:
IC	14	Ata Hingano
IC	15	Shannon Boyd
IC	16	Josh Papalii
IC	17	Dunamis Lui
Coach:
Ricky Stuart

==== Round 8 ====
Saturday, 28 April
7:30pm

North Queensland Cowboys	8 – 18	Canberra Raiders
Tries: Gavin Cooper (16') 1 Goals: Johnathan Thurston 2/2 (18', 49' pen)	1st: 6 – 6; 2nd: 2 – 12	Tries: 1 (26') Josh Papalii; 1 (51') Aidan Sezer; 1 (74') Siliva Havili; Goals: 3/3 Jarrod Croker (27', 53', 75')

1300SMILES Stadium, Townsville
Attendance: 14,004
Referee: Henry Perenara, Jon Stone
Player of the Match: Joseph Tapine

Team lists:

FB	1	Lachlan Coote
WG	2	Kyle Feldt
CE	3	Justin O'Neill
CE	4	Ben Hampton
WG	5	Antonio Winterstein
FE	6	Michael Morgan
HB	7	Johnathan Thurston (c)
PR	8	Matthew Scott (c)
HK	9	Jake Granville
PR	10	Scott Bolton
SR	11	Gavin Cooper
SR	12	Coen Hess
LK	13	Jason Taumalolo
Substitutes:
IC	14	Te Maire Martin
IC	15	Shaun Fensom
IC	16	Corey Jensen
IC	17	Ethan Lowe
Coach:
Paul Green

FB	1	Jack Wighton
WG	2	Nick Cotric
CE	3	Jarrod Croker (c)
CE	4	Joseph Leilua
WG	5	Jordan Rapana
FE	6	Blake Austin
HB	7	Aidan Sezer
PR	8	Sia Soliola
HK	9	Siliva Havili
PR	10	Junior Paulo
SR	11	Joseph Tapine
SR	12	Elliott Whitehead
LK	13	Josh Papalii
Substitutes:
IC	14	Ata Hingano
IC	15	Shannon Boyd
IC	16	Luke Bateman
IC	17	Dunamis Lui
Coach:
Ricky Stuart

==== Round 9 ====
Saturday, 5 May
3:00pm

Canberra Raiders	32 – 18	Gold Coast Titans
Tries: Sia Soliola (2') 1 Joseph Tapine (13') 1 Jarrod Croker (16') 1 Nick Cotric (24') 1 Shannon Boyd (54') 1 Jordan Rapana (58') 1 Goals: Jarrod Croker 4/6 (4', 17', 56', 59')	1st: 20 – 0; 2nd: 12 – 18	Tries: 1 (45') Ryan James; 1 (49') Kevin Proctor; 1 (76') Max King; Goals: 3/3 Michael Gordon (46', 50', 77')

GIO Stadium, Canberra
Attendance: 11,170
Referee: Gavin Reynolds, Alan Shortall
Player of the Match: Shannon Boyd

Team lists:

FB	1	Jack Wighton
WG	2	Nick Cotric
CE	3	Jarrod Croker (c)
CE	4	Joseph Leilua
WG	5	Jordan Rapana
FE	6	Blake Austin
HB	7	Aidan Sezer
PR	8	Sia Soliola
HK	9	Siliva Havili
PR	10	Junior Paulo
SR	11	Joseph Tapine
SR	12	Elliott Whitehead
LK	13	Josh Papalii
Substitutes:
IC	14	Ata Hingano
IC	15	Shannon Boyd
IC	16	Luke Bateman
IC	17	Dunamis Lui
Coach:
Ricky Stuart

FB	1	Michael Gordon
WG	2	Anthony Don
CE	3	Brendan Elliot
CE	4	Konrad Hurrell
WG	5	Phillip Sami
FE	6	Bryce Cartwright
HB	7	Ashley Taylor
PR	8	Jarrod Wallace
HK	9	Mitch Rein
PR	14	Max King
SR	11	Kevin Proctor
SR	10	Ryan James (c)
LK	13	Jai Arrow
Substitutes:
IC	15	Jack Stockwell
IC	16	Keegan Hipgrave
IC	17	Ryan Simpkins
IC	19	Moeaki Fotuaika
Coach:
Garth Brennan

==== Round 10 ====
Sunday, 13 May
4:10pm

Canberra Raiders	16 – 24	Cronulla-Sutherland Sharks
Tries: Nick Cotric (8') 1 Blake Austin (28') 1 Goals: Jarrod Croker 4/4 (9', 30', 35' pen, 40' pen)	1st: 16 – 8; 2nd: 0 – 16	Tries: 2 (10', 79') Valentine Holmes; 1 (56') Jack Williams; 1 (67') Sosaia Feki; Goals: 3/4 Chad Townsend (12', 24' pen, 57', 80')

GIO Stadium, Canberra
Attendance: 11,047
Referee: Ben Cummins, Henry Perenara
Player of the Match: Andrew Fifita

Team lists:

FB	1	Jack Wighton
WG	2	Nick Cotric
CE	3	Jarrod Croker (c)
CE	4	Joseph Leilua
WG	5	Jordan Rapana
FE	6	Blake Austin
HB	7	Aidan Sezer
PR	8	Sia Soliola
HK	9	Siliva Havili
PR	10	Shannon Boyd
SR	11	Joseph Tapine
SR	12	Elliott Whitehead
LK	13	Josh Papalii
Substitutes:
IC	14	Ata Hingano
IC	15	Luke Bateman
IC	16	Charlie Gubb
IC	17	Dunamis Lui
Coach:
Ricky Stuart

FB	1	Valentine Holmes
WG	2	Sosaia Feki
CE	3	Jesse Ramien
CE	4	Ricky Leutele
WG	5	Edrick Lee
FE	6	Matt Moylan
HB	7	Chad Townsend
PR	8	Andrew Fifita (c)
HK	9	Jayden Brailey
PR	10	Matt Prior
SR	11	Kurt Capewell
SR	14	Joseph Paulo
LK	16	Ava Seumanufagi
Substitutes:
IC	15	James Segeyaro
IC	17	Jack Williams
IC	18	Kurt Dillon
IC	19	Braden Uele
Coach:
Shane Flanagan

==== Round 11 ====
Sunday, 20 May
2:00pm

St George Illawarra Dragons	25 – 18	Canberra Raiders
Tries: Jack de Belin (19') 1 Gareth Widdop (49') 1 Matthew Dufty (70') 1 Goals: Gareth Widdop 6/6 (21', 38' pen, 40' pen, 51', 63' pen, 71'); Field Goals: Gareth Widdop (77')	1st: 10 – 10; 2nd: 15 – 8	Tries: 1 (5') Nick Cotric; 1 (23') Joseph Leilua; 1 (56') Jordan Rapana; Goals: 3/4 Jarrod Croker (25', 43' pen, 58'); Sin Bin: (61') Jordan Rapana

Glen Willow Oval, Mudgee
Attendance: 8,962
Referee: Ashley Klein, Peter Gough
Player of the Match: Gareth Widdop

Team lists:

FB	1	Matthew Dufty
WG	2	Nene Macdonald
CE	3	Euan Aitken
CE	4	Timoteo Lafai
WG	5	Jason Nightingale
FE	6	Gareth Widdop (c)
HB	7	Ben Hunt
PR	8	James Graham
HK	9	Cameron McInnes
PR	10	Paul Vaughan
SR	11	Tyson Frizell
SR	12	Tariq Sims
LK	13	Jack de Belin
Substitutes:
IC	14	Jeremy Latimore
IC	15	Kurt Mann
IC	16	Leeson Ah Mau
IC	17	Blake Lawrie
Coach:
Paul McGregor

FB	1	Jack Wighton
WG	2	Nick Cotric
CE	3	Jarrod Croker (c)
CE	4	Joseph Leilua
WG	5	Jordan Rapana
FE	6	Blake Austin
HB	7	Aidan Sezer
PR	8	Sia Soliola
HK	9	Siliva Havili
PR	16	Charlie Gubb
SR	11	Joseph Tapine
SR	12	Elliott Whitehead
LK	13	Josh Papalii
Substitutes:
IC	10	Shannon Boyd
IC	14	Ata Hingano
IC	15	Luke Bateman
IC	17	Dunamis Lui
Coach:
Ricky Stuart

==== Round 12 ====
Friday, 25 May
6:00pm

Canberra Raiders	21 – 20	Manly Warringah Sea Eagles
Tries: Nick Cotric (23', 28') 2 Jack Wighton (76') 1 Goals: Jarrod Croker 4/6 (4' pen, 40' pen, 46' pen, 78'); Field Goals: Aidan Sezer (80')	1st: 12 – 14; 2nd: 9 – 6	Tries: 1 (8') Daly Cherry-Evans; 1 (19') Joel Thompson; 1 (64') Brian Kelly; Goals: 4/4 Trent Hodkinson (9', 14' pen, 20', 50' pen); 0/1 Daly Cherry-Evans; Sin Bin: (59') Trent Hodkinson

GIO Stadium, Canberra
Attendance: 11,105
Referee: Chris Butler, Alan Shortall
Player of the Match: Nick Cotric

Team lists:

FB	1	Jack Wighton
WG	2	Nick Cotric
CE	3	Jarrod Croker (c)
CE	4	Joseph Leilua
WG	5	Jordan Rapana
FE	6	Blake Austin
HB	7	Aidan Sezer
PR	8	Dunamis Lui
HK	9	Siliva Havili
PR	10	Shannon Boyd
SR	11	Josh Papalii
SR	12	Elliott Whitehead
LK	13	Sia Soliola
Substitutes:
IC	14	Ata Hingano
IC	15	Luke Bateman
IC	16	Charlie Gubb
IC	17	Liam Knight
Coach:
Ricky Stuart

FB	1	Tom Trbojevic
WG	2	Jorge Taufua
CE	3	Moses Suli
CE	4	Brian Kelly
WG	5	Akuila Uate
FE	6	Trent Hodkinson
HB	7	Daly Cherry-Evans (c)
PR	8	Addin Fonua-Blake
HK	9	Lewis Brown
PR	10	Martin Taupau
SR	11	Joel Thompson
SR	12	Shaun Lane
LK	13	Jake Trbojevic
Substitutes:
IC	14	Matthew Wright
IC	15	Frank Winterstein
IC	16	Lloyd Perrett
IC	17	Toafofoa Sipley
Coach:
Trent Barrett

==== Round 13 ====
Canberra Raiders	v	Bye

==== Round 14 ====
Friday, 8 June
6:00pm

Canberra Raiders	22 – 23	Penrith Panthers
Tries: Nick Cotric (15') 1 Jordan Rapana (49') 1 Elliott Whitehead (62') 1 Goals: Jarrod Croker 5/5 (16', 38' pen, 49', 63', 69' pen)	1st: 8 – 8; 2nd: 14 – 15	Tries: 2 (4', 66') Tyrone Peachey; 1 (75') Dean Whare; Goals: 5/6 James Maloney (8' pen, 11' pen, 43' pen, 67', 76'); Field Goals: 1 (79') Nathan Cleary; Sin Bin: (34') Kaide Ellis

GIO Stadium, Canberra
Attendance: 7,662
Referee: Henry Perenara, Chris Butler
Player of the Match: Josh Papalii

Team lists:

FB	1	Jack Wighton
WG	2	Nick Cotric
CE	3	Jarrod Croker (c)
CE	4	Joseph Leilua
WG	5	Jordan Rapana
FE	6	Blake Austin
HB	7	Aidan Sezer
PR	8	Dunamis Lui
HK	9	Siliva Havili
PR	10	Shannon Boyd
SR	11	Sia Soliola
SR	12	Elliott Whitehead
LK	13	Josh Papalii
Substitutes:
IC	14	Ata Hingano
IC	15	Luke Bateman
IC	16	Charlie Gubb
IC	17	Liam Knight
Coach:
Ricky Stuart

FB	1	Dallin Watene-Zelezniak
WG	2	Christian Crichton
CE	3	Tyrone Peachey
CE	4	Dean Whare
WG	5	Tyrone Phillips
FE	6	James Maloney (c)
HB	7	Nathan Cleary
PR	8	Trent Merrin
HK	9	Sione Katoa
PR	10	Reagan Campbell-Gillard
SR	11	Corey Harawira-Naera
SR	12	Isaah Yeo
LK	13	James Fisher-Harris
Substitutes:
IC	14	Wayde Egan
IC	15	Kaide Ellis
IC	16	Viliame Kikau
IC	17	James Tamou
Coach:
Anthony Griffin

==== Round 15 ====
Sunday, 17 June
4:10pm

Wests Tigers	12 – 48	Canberra Raiders
Tries: Chris Lawrence (11') 1 Corey Thompson (14') 1 Goals: Esan Marsters 2/2 (12', 15')	1st: 12 – 10; 2nd: 0 – 38	Tries: 2 (43', 59') Joseph Tapine; 2 (5', 73') Joseph Leilua; 1 (27') Josh Papalii; 1 (54') Nick Cotric; 1 (64') Blake Austin; 1 (70') Michael Oldfield; 1 (78') Liam Knight; Goals: 6/9 Jarrod Croker (29', 45', 55', 66', 75', 79'); Sin Bin: (23') Blake Austin

Campbelltown Stadium, Sydney
Attendance: 10,237
Referee: Grant Atkins, Gavin Badger
Player of the Match: Josh Hodgson

Team lists:

FB	1	Corey Thompson
WG	2	Malakai Watene-Zelezniak
CE	3	Esan Marsters
CE	4	Mahe Fonua
WG	5	Kevin Naiqama
FE	19	Tyson Gamble
HB	7	Luke Brooks
PR	8	Russell Packer (c)
HK	15	Matt McIlwrick
PR	10	Ben Matulino
SR	11	Chris Lawrence (c)
SR	12	Robbie Rochow
LK	13	Matthew Eisenhuth
Substitutes:
IC	15	Elijah Taylor (c)
IC	14	Alex Twal
IC	16	Josh Aloiai
IC	17	Tim Grant
Coach:
Ivan Cleary

FB	1	Jack Wighton
WG	2	Nick Cotric
CE	3	Jarrod Croker (c)
CE	4	Joseph Leilua
WG	5	Michael Oldfield
FE	6	Blake Austin
HB	7	Aidan Sezer
PR	16	Dunamis Lui
HK	14	Siliva Havili
PR	10	Shannon Boyd
SR	11	Joseph Tapine
SR	12	Elliott Whitehead
LK	13	Josh Papalii
Substitutes:
IC	8	Sia Soliola
IC	9	Josh Hodgson
IC	15	Luke Bateman
IC	17	Liam Knight
Coach:
Ricky Stuart

==== Round 16 ====
Saturday, 30 June
7:30pm

Brisbane Broncos	26 – 22	Canberra Raiders
Tries: Corey Oates (47') 1 Alex Glenn (53') 1 Jordan Kahu (67') 1 Anthony Milford (72') 1 Goals: Jamayne Isaako 5/5 (48', 54', 69', 73', 79' pen)	1st: 0 – 16; 2nd: 26 – 6	Tries: 1 (3') Elliott Whitehead; 1 (32') Nick Cotric; 1 (60') Josh Hodgson; Goals: 5/6 Jarrod Croker (5', 13' pen, 34', 40' pen, 61')

Suncorp Stadium, Brisbane
Attendance: 30,495
Referee: Chris Sutton, Alan Shortall
Player of the Match: Anthony Milford

Team lists:

FB	1	Darius Boyd (c)
WG	2	Corey Oates
CE	3	James Roberts
CE	4	Jordan Kahu
WG	5	Jamayne Isaako
FE	6	Anthony Milford
HB	7	Kodi Nikorima
PR	8	Matthew Lodge
HK	9	Andrew McCullough
PR	10	Sam Thaiday
SR	17	Alex Glenn
SR	12	Jaydn Su'A
LK	13	Josh McGuire
Substitutes:
IC	14	Patrick Mago
IC	16	Tom Opacic
IC	18	Korbin Sims
IC	21	David Fifita
Coach:
Wayne Bennett

FB	21	Brad Abbey
WG	2	Nick Cotric
CE	3	Jarrod Croker (c)
CE	4	Joseph Leilua
WG	5	Michael Oldfield
FE	6	Blake Austin
HB	7	Aidan Sezer
PR	16	Dunamis Lui
HK	9	Josh Hodgson
PR	10	Shannon Boyd
SR	11	Joseph Tapine
SR	12	Elliott Whitehead
LK	13	Josh Papalii
Substitutes:
IC	8	Sia Soliola
IC	14	Siliva Havili
IC	15	Junior Paulo
IC	17	Liam Knight
Coach:
Ricky Stuart

==== Round 17 ====
Saturday, 7 July
7:30pm

Canterbury-Bankstown Bulldogs	28 – 32	Canberra Raiders
Tries: Rhyse Martin (42', 59', 63') 3 Jeremy Marshall-King (7') 1 Goals: Rhyse Martin 6/6 (9', 27' pen, 43', 61', 65', 73' pen)	1st: 8 – 10; 2nd: 20 – 22	Tries: 1 (20') Sam Williams; 1 (30') Jarrod Croker; 1 (54') Nick Cotric; 1 (75') Blake Austin; 1 (78') Joseph Tapine; 1 (79') Joseph Leilua; Goals: 4/6 Jarrod Croker (21', 75', 78', 80')

Belmore Sports Ground, Sydney
Attendance: 10,145
Referee: Grant Atkins, Gavin Badger
Player of the Match: Blake Austin

Team lists:

FB	1	Will Hopoate
WG	2	Brett Morris
CE	3	Kerrod Holland
CE	23	Josh Morris
WG	5	Reimis Smith
FE	6	Lachlan Lewis
HB	7	Jeremy Marshall-King
PR	8	Aiden Tolman
HK	9	Michael Lichaa
PR	10	Danny Fualalo
SR	11	Josh Jackson (c)
SR	12	Rhyse Martin
LK	13	Adam Elliott
Substitutes:
IC	14	Fa'amanu Brown
IC	15	Clay Priest
IC	16	Ofahiki Ogden
IC	17	Greg Eastwood
Coach:
Dean Pay

FB	1	Brad Abbey
WG	2	Nick Cotric
CE	3	Jarrod Croker (c)
CE	4	Joseph Leilua
WG	5	Michael Oldfield
FE	6	Sam Williams
HB	7	Aidan Sezer
PR	8	Dunamis Lui
HK	9	Josh Hodgson
PR	10	Shannon Boyd
SR	11	Joseph Tapine
SR	12	Elliott Whitehead
LK	13	Siliva Havili
Substitutes:
IC	14	Blake Austin
IC	15	Junior Paulo
IC	16	Liam Knight
IC	17	Sia Soliola
Coach:
Ricky Stuart

==== Round 18 ====
Saturday, 14 July
7:30pm

Canberra Raiders	38 – 12	North Queensland Cowboys
Tries: Michael Oldfield (11', 65', 70') 3 Jordan Rapana (4', 73') 2 Blake Austin (32') 1 Aidan Sezer (79') 1 Goals: Aidan Sezer 5/6 (33', 66', 71', 75', 80'); Jarrod Croker 0/1	1st: 14 – 12; 2nd: 24 – 0	Tries: 1 (20') Lachlan Coote; 1 (35') Gavin Cooper; Goals: 2/2 Johnathan Thurston (22', 36')

GIO Stadium, Canberra
Attendance: 11,471
Referee: Henry Perenara, Liam Kennedy
Player of the Match: Michael Oldfield

Team lists:

FB	1	Nick Cotric
WG	2	Michael Oldfield
CE	3	Jarrod Croker (c)
CE	4	Joseph Leilua
WG	5	Jordan Rapana
FE	6	Sam Williams
HB	7	Aidan Sezer
PR	8	Dunamis Lui
HK	9	Josh Hodgson
PR	10	Junior Paulo
SR	17	Sia Soliola
SR	12	Elliott Whitehead
LK	13	Josh Papalii
Substitutes:
IC	14	Blake Austin
IC	15	Luke Bateman
IC	16	Siliva Havili
IC	18	Liam Knight
Coach:
Ricky Stuart

FB	1	Lachlan Coote
WG	2	Kyle Feldt
CE	3	Enari Tuala
CE	4	Kane Linnett
WG	5	Antonio Winterstein
FE	6	Te Maire Martin
HB	7	Johnathan Thurston (c)
PR	8	John Asiata
HK	9	Jake Granville
PR	10	Scott Bolton
SR	11	Gavin Cooper
SR	16	Shane Wright
LK	13	Jason Taumalolo
Substitutes:
IC	12	Coen Hess
IC	14	Ben Hampton
IC	15	Shaun Fensom
IC	17	Corey Jensen
Coach:
Paul Green

==== Round 19 ====
Friday, 20 July
6:00pm

Cronulla-Sutherland Sharks	28 – 24	Canberra Raiders
Tries: Andrew Fifita (10') 1 Ricky Leutele (16') 1 Valentine Holmes (35') 1 Wade Graham (40') 1 Sione Katoa (58') 1 Goals: Chad Townsend 4/6 (11', 18', 37', 59')	1st: 22 – 6; 2nd: 6 – 18	Tries: 2 (42', 49') Joseph Leilua; 1 (21') Brad Abbey; 1 (76') Jordan Rapana; Goals: 4/4 Sam Williams (24', 43', 50', 78'); Sin Bin: (4') Jordan Rapana

Southern Cross Group Stadium, Sydney
Attendance: 10,016
Referee: Gerard Sutton, Gavin Reynolds
Player of the Match: Andrew Fifita

Team lists:

FB	1	Valentine Holmes
WG	2	Sione Katoa
CE	3	Jesse Ramien
CE	4	Ricky Leutele
WG	5	Edrick Lee
FE	6	Matt Moylan
HB	7	Chad Townsend
PR	8	Andrew Fifita
HK	9	Jayden Brailey
PR	10	Matt Prior
SR	11	Scott Sorensen
SR	12	Wade Graham
LK	13	Paul Gallen (c)
Substitutes:
IC	14	Joseph Paulo
IC	15	James Segeyaro
IC	16	Aaron Woods
IC	17	Jayson Bukuya
Coach:
Shane Flanagan

FB	3	Brad Abbey
WG	2	Nick Cotric
CE	3	Michael Oldfield
CE	4	Joseph Leilua
WG	5	Jordan Rapana
FE	6	Sam Williams
HB	14	Blake Austin
PR	8	Dunamis Lui
HK	9	Josh Hodgson (c)
PR	10	Junior Paulo
SR	11	Sia Soliola
SR	12	Elliott Whitehead
LK	13	Josh Papalii
Substitutes:
IC	15	Luke Bateman
IC	16	Siliva Havili
IC	17	Liam Knight
IC	19	Jack Murchie
Coach:
Ricky Stuart

==== Round 20 ====
Saturday, 28 July
7:30pm

Melbourne Storm	44 – 10	Canberra Raiders
Tries: Curtis Scott (40', 64') 2 Felise Kaufusi (7') 1 Cameron Munster (16') 1 Suliasi Vunivalu (32') 1 Josh Addo-Carr (44') 1 Nelson Asofa-Solomona (61') 1 Goals: Cameron Smith 8/9 (3' pen, 8', 18', 40', 45', 63', 65', 70' pen)	1st: 24 – 4; 2nd: 20 – 6	Tries: 1 (28') Sia Soliola; 1 (56') Joseph Leilua; Goals: 1/2 Sam Williams (57')

AAMI Park, Melbourne
Attendance: 15,298
Referee: Adam Gee, Ziggy Przeklasa-Adamski
Player of the Match: Cameron Munster

==== Round 21 ====
Sunday, 5 August
4:10pm

Penrith Panthers	v	Canberra Raiders

Panthers Stadium, Sydney

==== Round 22 ====
Sunday, 12 August
2:00pm

Canberra Raiders	v	Wests Tigers

GIO Stadium, Canberra

==== Round 23 ====
Sunday, 19 August
4:10pm

Canberra Raiders	v	Sydney Roosters

GIO Stadium, Canberra

==== Round 24 ====
Saturday, 25 August
3:00pm

Canberra Raiders	v	South Sydney Rabbitohs

GIO Stadium, Canberra

==== Round 25 ====
Friday, 31 August
6:00pm

New Zealand Warriors	v	Canberra Raiders

Mount Smart Stadium, Auckland

- Green = Win, Red = Loss, Blue = Bye.

== Ladder ==
Pos	Team	Pld	W	D	L	B	PF	PA	PD	Pts	
1	Sydney Roosters (M, P)	24	16	0	8	1	542	361	+181	34	Advance to finals series
2	Melbourne Storm	24	16	0	8	1	536	363	+173	34	Advance to finals series
3	South Sydney Rabbitohs	24	16	0	8	1	582	437	+145	34	Advance to finals series
4	Cronulla-Sutherland Sharks	24	16	0	8	1	519	423	+96	34	Advance to finals series
5	Penrith Panthers	24	15	0	9	1	517	461	+56	32	Advance to finals series
6	Brisbane Broncos	24	15	0	9	1	556	500	+56	32	Advance to finals series
7	St. George Illawarra Dragons	24	15	0	9	1	519	472	+47	32	Advance to finals series
8	New Zealand Warriors	24	15	0	9	1	472	447	+25	32	Advance to finals series
9	Wests Tigers	24	12	0	12	1	377	460	−83	26	
10	Canberra Raiders	24	10	0	14	1	563	540	+23	22	
11	Newcastle Knights	24	9	0	15	1	414	607	−193	20	
12	Canterbury-Bankstown Bulldogs	24	8	0	16	1	428	474	−46	18	
13	North Queensland Cowboys	24	8	0	16	1	449	521	−72	18	
14	Gold Coast Titans	24	8	0	16	1	472	582	−110	18	
15	Manly-Warringah Sea Eagles	24	7	0	17	1	500	622	−122	16	
16	Parramatta Eels (W)	24	6	0	18	1	374	550	−176	14	

Updated to match(es) played on 2 September 2018. Source: 2018 NRL Ladder
(M) Minor premiers; (P) Premiers; (W) Wooden spoon

== 2018 Meninga Medal Award Winners ==
NSW Cup Player of the Year –

NSW Cup Coaches Award –

Geoff Caldwell Welfare & Education Award – Joseph Tapine

Gordon McLucas Memorial Junior Representative Player of the Year - Jack Murchie

Fred Daly Memorial Club Person of the Year – Michael Oldfield

NRL Rookie of the Year – Emre Guler

NRL Coaches Award – Nick Cotric

Meninga Medal – Josh Papalii
