= List of Canberra Raiders representatives =

Including players from the Canberra Raiders that have represented while at the club and the years they achieved their honours, if known.

== International ==
=== Australia ===
- (Australia) Mal Meninga (1986, 1988–94)
- (Australia) Gary Belcher (1988–91)
- (Australia) Sam Backo (1988)
- (Australia) Peter Jackson (1988)
- (Australia) Bradley Clyde (1989, 1991–94)
- (Australia) Laurie Daley (1990–94, 1998–99)
- (Australia) Glenn Lazarus (1990–91)
- (Australia) Ricky Stuart (1990, 1994)
- (Australia) Steve Walters (1991–94)
- (Australia) Gary Coyne (1991)
- (Australia) Brett Mullins (1994)
- (Australia) David Furner (1994)
- (Australia) Jason Croker (2000)
- (Australia) Terry Campese (2008)
- (Australia) Joel Monaghan (2008)
- (Australia) David Shillington (2009–12)
- (Australia) Tom Learoyd-Lahrs (2010)
- (Australia) Josh Papalii (2013–19)
- (Australia) Shannon Boyd (2016)
- (Australia) Nick Cotric (2019)
- (Australia) Jack Wighton (2019–22)
- (Australia) Hudson Young (2024-25)

=== Australia (SL) ===
- (Australia) Bradley Clyde (1997)
- (Australia) Laurie Daley (1997)
- (Australia) Brett Mullins (1997)
- (Australia) David Furner (1997)
- (Australia) Ken Nagas (1997)
- (Australia) Luke Priddis (1997)

=== Great Britain ===
- (United Kingdom) John Bateman (2019)
- (United Kingdom) Josh Hodgson (2019)
- (United Kingdom) Elliott Whitehead (2019)

=== England ===
- (England) Josh Hodgson (2015–18)
- (England) Elliott Whitehead (2016–18, 2022-23)
- (England) Morgan Smithies (2025)

=== Fiji ===
- (Fiji) Noa Nadruku (1994–97)
- (Fiji) Tabua Cakacaka (2000)
- (Fiji) Mikaele Ravalawa (2017)
- (Fiji) Semi Valemei (2022)

=== New Zealand ===
- (New Zealand) Brent Todd (1987, 1989–91)
- (New Zealand) Sean Hoppe (1992–93)
- (New Zealand) Quentin Pongia (1993, 1995–97)
- (New Zealand) John Lomax (1993–95)
- (New Zealand) Ruben Wiki (1994-04)
- (New Zealand) Lesley Vainikolo (1999-00)
- (New Zealand) Bronson Harrison (2009–10)
- (New Zealand) Joseph Tapine (2016-19, 2022-25)
- (New Zealand) Jordan Rapana (2016–18, 2022)
- (New Zealand) Charnze Nicoll-Klokstad (2019, 2022)
- (New Zealand) Sebastian Kris (2022, 2025)
- (New Zealand) Matthew Timoko (2023-25)

=== South Africa ===
- (South Africa) Sean Rutgerson (2000)

=== Papua New Guinea ===
- (Papua New Guinea) David Westley (1995–96)
- (Papua New Guinea) Bruce Mamando (1995)
- (Papua New Guinea) Neville Costigan (2008)
- (Papua New Guinea) Luke Page (2015)
- (Papua New Guinea) Kato Ottio (2016-17)
- (Papua New Guinea) Kurt Baptiste (2016-17)

=== Cook Island ===
- (Cook Islands) Sam Mataora (2013)
- (Cook Islands) Ezra Howe (2015)
- (Cook Islands) Jordan Rapana (2015)
- (Cook Islands) Makahesi Makatoa (2017)

=== Samoa ===
- (Samoa) Anthony Swann (2000)
- (Samoa) Alby Talipeau (2008)
- (Samoa) Anthony Milford (2013)
- (Samoa) Junior Paulo (2016-17)
- (Samoa) Joseph Leilua (2017-19)
- (Samoa) Josh Papalii (2017, 2022, 2025)
- (Samoa) Dunamis Lui (2018-19)
- (Samoa) Simi Sasagi (2024-25)
- (Samoa) Ata Mariota (2025)

=== Tonga ===
- (Tonga) Una Taufa (1995)
- (Tonga) Greg Wolfgramm (2000)
- (Tonga) Brent Kite (2000)
- (Tonga) Sam Huihahau (2009)
- (Tonga) Bill Tupou (2014)
- (Tonga) Siliva Havili (2018–19)
- (Tonga) Ata Hingano (2018)

=== Turkey ===
- (Turkey) Aidan Sezer (2018)
- (Turkey) Emre Guler (2018)

=== Lebanon ===
- (Lebanon) Reece Robinson (2014)
- (Lebanon) Jamal Nchouk (2014)

=== Italy ===
- (Italy) Paul Vaughan (2013)

=== Scotland ===
- (Scotland) Scott Logan (2008)

=== Ireland ===
- (Republic of Ireland) Brett White (2013)

=== Wales ===
- (Wales) Justin Morgan (2000)

== State Of Origin ==
=== New South Wales ===
- (New South Wales) John Ferguson (1988–89)
- (New South Wales) Bradley Clyde (1989–92, 1994)
- (New South Wales) Laurie Daley (1989–94, 1996, 1998–99)
- (New South Wales) Glenn Lazarus (1989–91)
- (New South Wales) Ricky Stuart (1990–94)
- (New South Wales) Jason Croker (1993, 1996, 2001)
- (New South Wales) Brett Mullins (1994, 1996)
- (New South Wales) Ken Nagas (1994)
- (New South Wales) David Furner (1996, 1998–00)
- (New South Wales) Ben Kennedy (1999)
- (New South Wales) Ryan O'Hara (2004)
- (New South Wales) Joel Monaghan (2008–10)
- (New South Wales) Terry Campese (2009)
- (New South Wales) Tom Learoyd-Lahrs (2009–10)
- (New South Wales) Josh Dugan (2011)
- (New South Wales) Blake Ferguson (2013)
- (New South Wales) Nick Cotric (2019)
- (New South Wales) Jack Wighton (2019–22)
- (New South Wales) Hudson Young (2023-24)

=== New South Wales (SL) ===
- (New South Wales) Bradley Clyde (1997)
- (New South Wales) Laurie Daley (1997)
- (New South Wales) Brett Mullins (1997)
- (New South Wales) David Furner (1997)
- (New South Wales) Ken Nagas (1997)
- (New South Wales) Luke Priddis (1997)

=== Queensland ===
- (Queensland) Mal Meninga (1986, 1989–94)
- (Queensland) Gary Belcher (1986–90, 1993)
- (Queensland) Peter Jackson (1987–88)
- (Queensland) Sam Backo (1988)
- (Queensland) Gary Coyne (1989–92)
- (Queensland) Kevin Walters (1989)
- (Queensland) Steve Walters (1990–94, 1996)
- (Queensland) Clinton Schifcofske (2002, 2006)
- (Queensland) Adam Mogg (2006)
- (Queensland) Neville Costigan (2007)
- (Queensland) David Shillington (2009–13)
- (Queensland) Josh Papalii (2013–22)
- (Queensland) Dunamis Lui (2020)
- (Queensland) Corey Horsburgh (2023)

== All Stars Game ==
=== Indigenous All Stars ===
- Tom Learoyd-Lahrs (2010, 2011, 2012)
- Joel Thompson (2010, 2011, 2012, 2013)
- Travis Waddell (2010, 2011, 2012)
- Reece Robinson (2013)
- Blake Ferguson (2013)
- Jake Foster (2013)
- Jack Wighton (2013, 2015, 2016)
- Edrick Lee (2016)

=== NRL All Stars ===
- (Australia) David Shillington (2010, 2013)
- (Australia) Josh Dugan (2011, 2012)
- (Australia) Jarrod Croker (2015)

== City Vs Country Origin ==
=== NSW Country ===
- (New South Wales) Ashley Gilbert (1988)
- (New South Wales) Chris O'Sullivan (1988)
- (New South Wales) Ivan Henjak (1989)
- (New South Wales) Dean Lance (1990)
- (New South Wales) Paul Martin (1991)
- (New South Wales) Jason Croker (2001)
- (New South Wales) Mark McLinden (2001)
- (New South Wales) Simon Woolford (2002)
- (New South Wales) Ryan O'Hara (2003–04)
- (New South Wales) Phil Graham (2007)
- (New South Wales) Joel Monaghan (2008–09)
- (New South Wales) Todd Carney (2008)
- (New South Wales) Terry Campese (2009)
- (New South Wales) Alan Tongue (2009)
- (New South Wales) Tom Learoyd-Lahrs (2010–12)
- (New South Wales) Josh Dugan (2010–11)
- (New South Wales) Joel Thompson (2011)
- (New South Wales) Blake Ferguson (2012)
- (New South Wales) Josh McCrone (2012–13)
- (New South Wales) Jack Wighton (2013–16)
- (New South Wales) Sam Williams (2013)
- (New South Wales) Paul Vaughan (2014–16)
- (New South Wales) Jarrod Croker (2015–16)
- (New South Wales) Shannon Boyd (2016)

=== NSW City ===
- (New South Wales) Bradley Clyde (1989)
- (New South Wales) Glenn Lazarus (1989)
- (New South Wales) Ricky Stuart (1990)
- (New South Wales) Brad Drew (2004)
- (New South Wales) Blake Austin (2015)
- (New South Wales) Aiden Sezer (2016)

== Other honours ==
=== Prime Minister's XIII ===
- (Australia) Tom Learoyd-Lahrs (2005, 2009)
- (Australia) Joel Monaghan (2007–09)
- (Australia) David Shillington (2007, 2009, 2011, 2013)
- (Australia) Terry Campese (2008, 2009)
- (Australia) Alan Tongue (2008)
- (Australia) Joe Picker (2008)
- (Australia) Josh Dugan (2009)
- (Australia) Blake Ferguson (2010, 2011)
- (Australia) Josh Papalii (2013, 2014)
- (Australia) Anthony Milford (2014)
- (Australia) Jarrod Croker (2014)

=== Indigenous Dreamtime Team ===
- Justin Carney (2008)

=== New Zealand Māori ===
- (Māori people) Bronx Goodwin (2008)

== Representative Captains ==
=== World Cup Captains ===
Australia

- (Australia) Mal Meninga (1990–92)

=== Test Captains ===
Australia

- (Australia) Mal Meninga (1990–94)
- (Australia) Laurie Daley (1993, 1997 (SL), 1998)

== Representative Coaching Staff ==
=== International ===
Australia

- (Australia) Don Furner (Coach - 1986–87)

Tim Sheen's 20??

=== State Of Origin ===
New South Wales

- (New South Wales) Tim Sheens (Coach - 1991)

Queensland

- (Queensland) Wayne Bennett (Coach - 1987)
- (Queensland) Neil Henry (Assistant Coach - 2007–08)

=== City Vs Country Origin ===
NSW City

- (New South Wales) Tim Sheens (Coach - 1991)

=== Other honours ===
Indigenous Dreamtime Team

- (Australia) Neil Henry (Coach - 2008)
