= Kerrod =

Kerrod is a given name and a surname.

Notable people with the given name include:

- Kerrod Gray (born 1990), Australian golfer
- Kerrod Hall (born 1990), Australian international touch football referee
- Kerrod Holland (born 1992), Australian professional rugby league footballer
- Kerrod McGregor (born 1962), Australian Paralympic athlete
- Kerrod Walters (born 1967), Australian former rugby league footballer
- Kerrod Williams (born 1990), Australian director/producer

Notable people with the surname include:

- Simon Kerrod (born 1992), South African rugby union player
