= Clay Priest =

Australian rugby league footballer (born 1989)

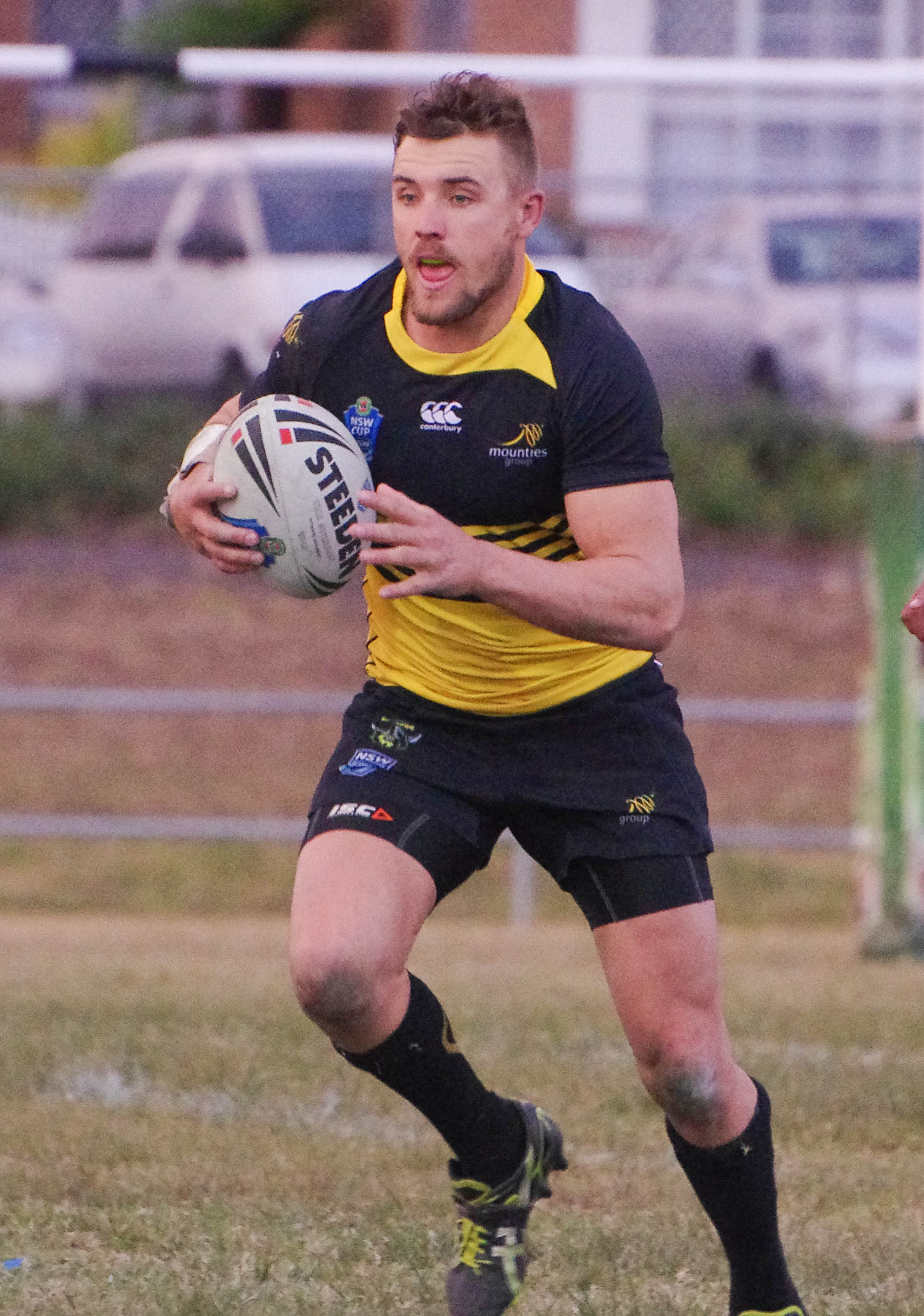
- Priest playing for the Mount Pritchard Mounties in 2014.

Personal information
- Born: 5 February 1989 (age 37) Penrith, New South Wales, Australia
- Height: 183 cm (6 ft 0 in)
- Weight: 97 kg (15 st 4 lb)

Playing information
- Position: Prop, Lock
Club
Years	Team	Pld	T	G	FG	P
2016–17	Canberra Raiders	31	0	0	0	0
2018	Canterbury Bulldogs	8	0	0	0	0
	Total	39	0	0	0	0
- Source: As of 4 March 2018

Clay Priest (born 5 February 1989) is an Australian rugby league footballer who last played for the Canterbury-Bankstown Bulldogs in the National Rugby League. He plays as a lock and prop. He has previously played for the Canberra Raiders. He currently plays for the Mudgee Dragons in the Western Premiership

== Background ==
Born in Penrith, New South Wales, Priest played his junior rugby league for Brothers Penrith, before being signed by the Mount Pritchard Mounties.

== Playing career ==
=== Early career ===
In 2014, Priest joined the Mount Pritchard Mounties in the New South Wales Cup, while training with NRL side Canberra Raiders during the pre-season.

=== 2016 ===
After impressing for the Mounties, Priest was handed a second-tier contract with the Raiders and made his NRL debut for them against the Wests Tigers in round 8 of the 2016 NRL season. On 18 August, he re-signed with the Raiders on a 2-year contract until the end of 2018. He finished his debut season with 14 NRL matches.

=== 2017 ===
Priest played 17 NRL matches for the Raiders during the 2017 season. In November, he signed a contract with the Canterbury-Bankstown Bulldogs for the 2018 season, in a swap deal with Bulldogs player Brad Abbey joining the Raiders.

=== 2018 ===
On 27 August, Priest was one of the players announced by Canterbury to be leaving at the end of the season after his contract was not renewed by the club.
