= Danny Fualalo =

Australian rugby league footballer

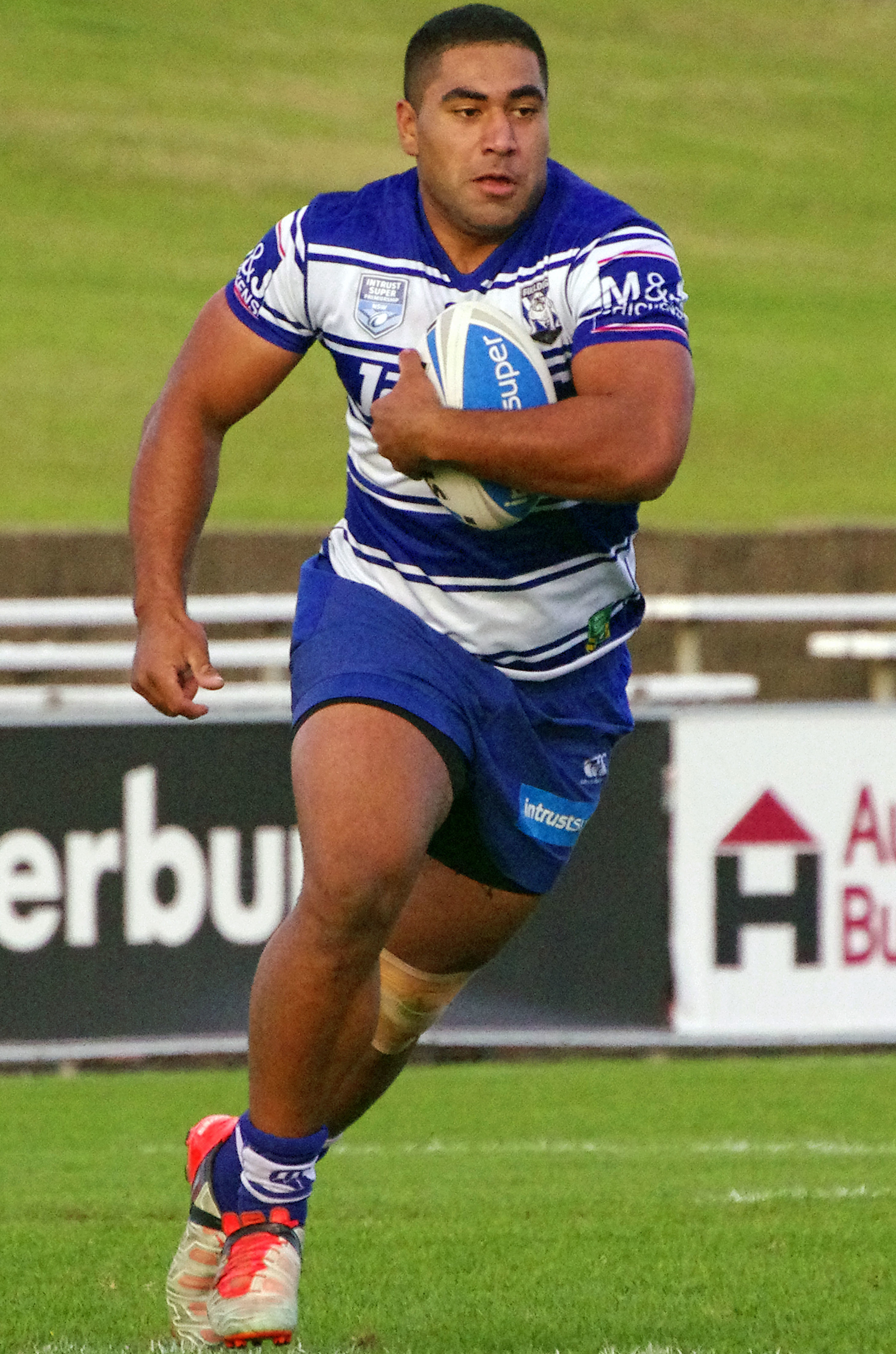

Personal information
- Full name: Daniel Fualalo
- Born: 20 October 1994 (age 32) Sydney, New South Wales, Australia
- Height: 187 cm (6 ft 2 in)
- Weight: 115 kg (18 st 2 lb)

Playing information
- Position: Lock, Prop
Club
Years	Team	Pld	T	G	FG	P
2015–19	Canterbury Bulldogs	73	1	0	0	4
Representative
Years	Team	Pld	T	G	FG	P
2015	NSW Residents	1	0	0	0	0
- Source: As of 9 January 2024

Danny Fualalo (born 20 October 1994) is an Australian professional rugby league footballer who last played for the Canterbury-Bankstown Bulldogs in the NRL.

== Background ==
Fualalo was born in Sydney, New South Wales, Australia. He is of Tongan and Portuguese descent.

He played his junior football for the Cabramatta Two Blues, before being signed by the Canterbury-Bankstown Bulldogs.

== Playing career ==
=== Early career ===
From 2012 to 2014, Fualalo played for the Canterbury-Bankstown Bulldogs' NYC team.

=== 2015 ===
In 2015, Fualalo moved on to the Bulldogs' New South Wales Cup team. In Round 7 of the 2015 NRL season, he made his NRL debut for the Bulldogs against the Manly Warringah Sea Eagles. On 3 May, he played for the New South Wales Residents against the Queensland Residents. On 11 September, he was named in the 58-man Tonga squad to play the Cook Islands on 17 October.

=== 2016 ===
Fualalo made 11 appearances for Canterbury in 2016 as the club qualified for the finals. Fualalo played in Canterbury's elimination final defeat against the Penrith Panthers.

=== 2017 ===
Fualalo made 24 appearances for Canterbury-Bankstown in 2017 as the club missed the finals for the first time since 2012. At the end of 2017, Des Hasler was terminated as head coach.

=== 2018 ===
Fualalo made 20 appearances for Canterbury as the club endured one of their worst seasons on the field. At one stage, Canterbury were running second last on the table until upset victories over Brisbane Broncos, New Zealand Warriors and St. George saved them from claiming the wooden spoon.

=== 2019 ===
Fualalo started the first two games for Canterbury in 2019 but after suffering heavy defeats against New Zealand Warriors and arch-rivals the Parramatta Eels, Fualalo was demoted to reserve grade by coach Dean Pay.

On 16 September, it was revealed that Fualalo would be released at the end of the season after not being offered a new contract for the 2020 season.
