= Brad Abbey =

New Zealand rugby league footballer

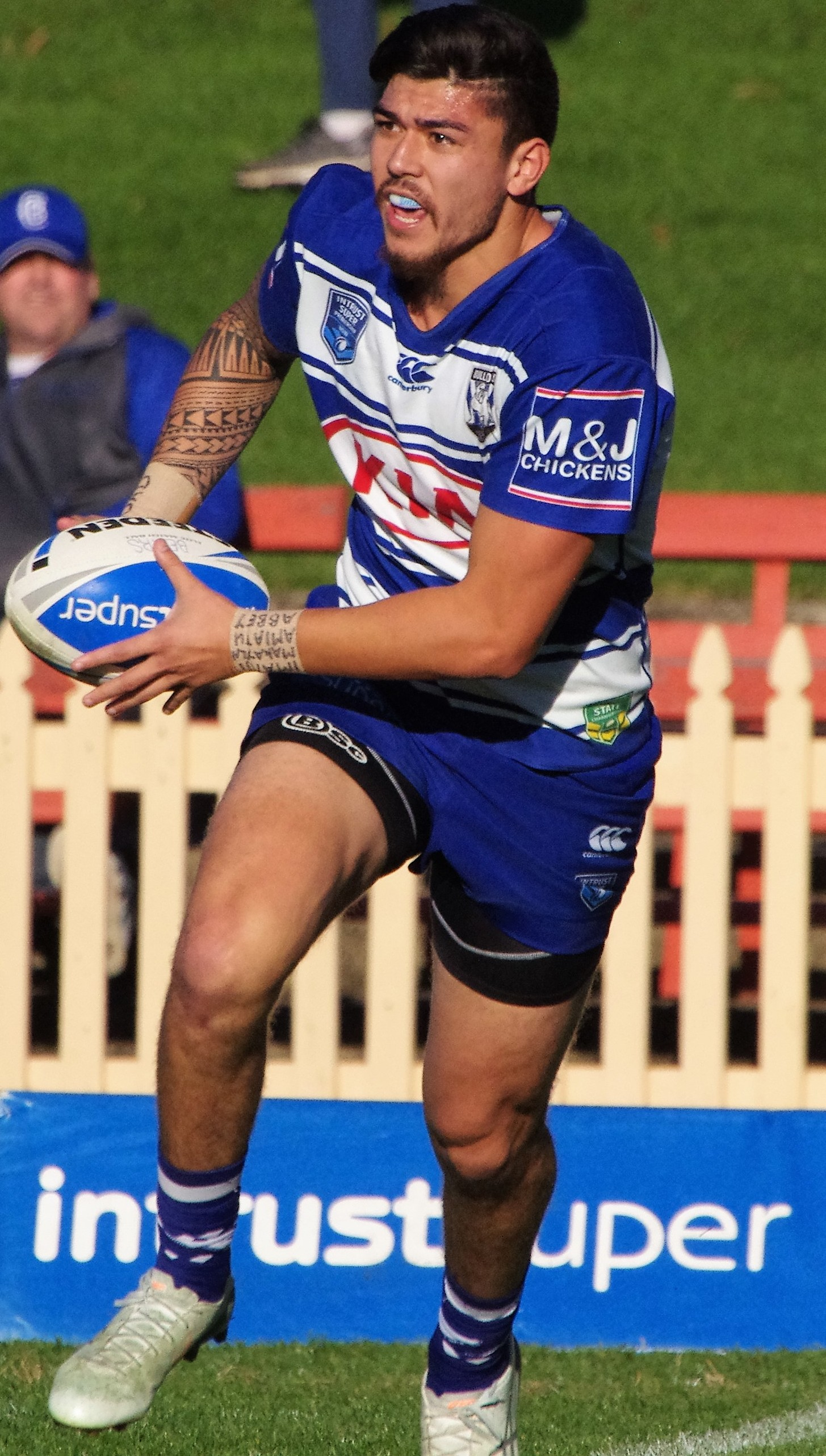

Personal information
- Full name: Bradley Abbey
- Born: 30 December 1996 (age 29) Auckland, New Zealand
- Height: 183 cm (6 ft 0 in)
- Weight: 92 kg (14 st 7 lb)

Playing information
- Position: Fullback, Centre
Club
Years	Team	Pld	T	G	FG	P
2017	Canterbury Bulldogs	4	1	1	0	6
2018	Canberra Raiders	9	1	0	0	4
2021	Sydney Roosters	1	0	0	0	0
	Total	14	2	1	0	10
- Source: As of 17 November 2020

Brad Abbey (born 30 December 1996) is a New Zealand professional rugby league footballer who plays fullback for the Blacktown Workers Sea Eagles in the NSW Cup.

Abbey previously played for the Canterbury-Bankstown Bulldogs, Canberra Raiders and Sydney Roosters in the National Rugby League.

== Background ==
Abbey was born in Auckland, New Zealand, and is of Samoan descent and Irish descent .

== Playing career ==
=== Early career ===
Abbey played his junior rugby league for the Pakuranga Jaguars and Richmond Rovers. He was then signed by the New Zealand Warriors.

In 2014 and 2015, Abbey played for the New Zealand Warriors' NYC team. In October 2015, he played for the Warriors in their 2014 NYC Grand Final win over the Brisbane Broncos. In November 2015, he signed a 3-year contract with the Canterbury-Bankstown Bulldogs starting in 2016. In May 2016, he played for the Junior Kiwis against the Junior Kangaroos.

=== 2017 ===
In round 3 of the 2017 NRL season, Abbey made his NRL debut for Canterbury against his former club, the Warriors. He went on to play 4 NRL matches in his debut season, scoring 1 try and kicking 1 goal. On 10 November, it was announced that Abbey had signed a two-year contract with the Canberra Raiders starting in 2018, after being released from his Canterbury contract in a player swap for Canberra player Clay Priest.

=== 2018 ===
Abbey came into the starting side to play fullback at short notice for the round 16 match against the Brisbane Broncos, that followed the suspension of Jack Wighton for an off-field incident. He faced his former club Canterbury-Bankstown Bulldogs in round 17. Abbey scored his only try of the season the in a controversial round 19 loss to the Cronulla-Sutherland Sharks.

=== 2019 ===
Abbey made no appearances for Canberra in the 2019 NRL season. Abbey spent his time playing for Mounties, Canberra's feeder club side in the Canterbury Cup NSW. Abbey was later ruled out for the season with an anterior cruciate ligament (ACL) knee injury.

On 13 October, it was announced that Abbey had been released by Canberra. On 26 November, it was revealed that Abbey was on a train and trial contract with the Wests Tigers.

=== 2021 ===
In February 2021, Abbey signed a train and trial contract with the Sydney Roosters. In round 1 of the NSW Cup competition, Abbey made his first appearance for Sydney Roosters feeder club North Sydney in a 48–20 loss against Blacktown Workers.

In round 24 of the 2021 NRL season, Abbey made his first appearance in the NRL for three years in the Sydney Roosters 54–12 loss against arch rivals South Sydney.
