= Michael Oldfield (rugby league) =

Tonga international rugby league footballer

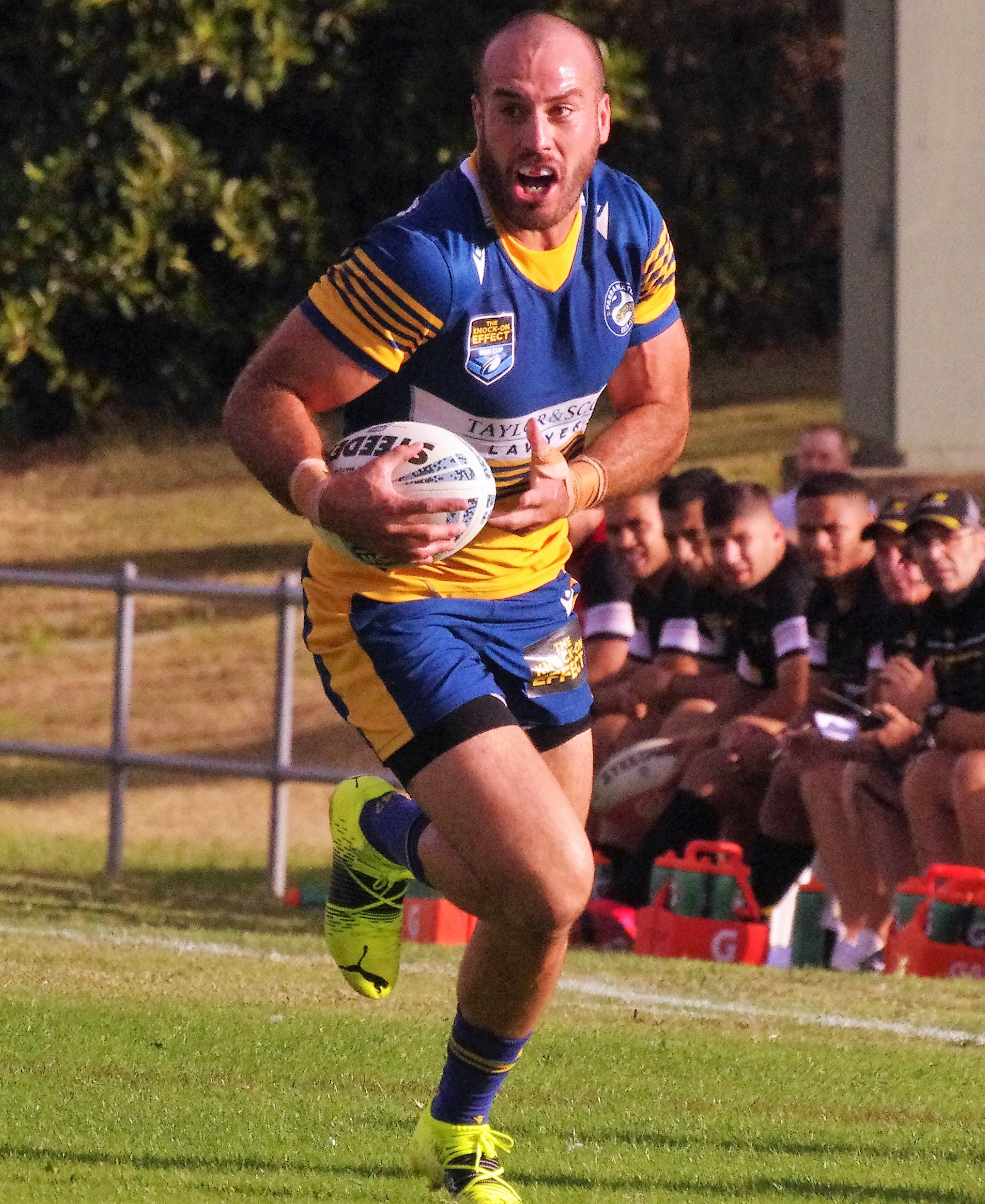

Personal information
- Born: 24 November 1990 (age 35) Manly, New South Wales, Australia
- Height: 186 cm (6 ft 1 in)
- Weight: 92 kg (14 st 7 lb)

Playing information
- Position: Wing, Centre
Club
Years	Team	Pld	T	G	FG	P
2010–12	Manly Sea Eagles	25	14	0	0	56
2013	Sydney Roosters	1	1	0	0	4
2014–15	Catalans Dragons	45	30	0	0	116
2016	South Sydney	4	2	0	0	8
2017	Penrith Panthers	1	1	0	0	4
2017–20	Canberra Raiders	24	12	0	0	48
2021	Parramatta Eels	2	0	0	0	0
	Total	102	60	0	0	236
Representative
Years	Team	Pld	T	G	FG	P
2013–16	Tonga	2	1	0	0	0
- Source: As of 17 March 2021

Michael Oldfield (born 24 November 1990) is a Tongan international rugby league footballer who last played as a winger and centre for the Parramatta Eels in the NRL.

He previously played for the Penrith Panthers, South Sydney Rabbitohs, Canberra Raiders, Sydney Roosters and the Manly-Warringah Sea Eagles in the National Rugby League, and the Catalans Dragons in the Super League.

== Background ==
Oldfield was born in Manly, New South Wales, Australia. He is of Tongan and European descent.

== Early years ==
He attended Harbord Public School as a junior and later attended Cromer High School. For years 11 and 12, Oldfield was offered a sport scholarship to The Scots College. During his time at Scots, Oldfield predominantly played rugby union.

== Playing career ==
=== Club career ===
==== Manly-Warringah Sea Eagles ====
Oldfield played 34 games for the Manly-Warringah Sea Eagles National Youth Competition team over the 2009 and 2010 seasons, scoring 23 tries.

Oldfield made his debut for Manly-Warringah in round 23 of the 2010 NRL season against the St George Illawarra Dragons.

In 2011, in each of the games he played, he scored a try. Along with fullback Brett Stewart, Oldfield was regarded as one of the fastest runners not only at Manly but in the NRL.

Oldfield traveled with the Sea Eagles to England and played in their 2012 World Club Challenge loss to the Leeds Rhinos before the start of the 2012 NRL season.

It was hoped that the flying winger would be the club's permanent replacement for long-time left winger Michael Robertson, who had left the club following the 2011 NRL Grand Final victory. Despite scoring 6 tries for the Sea Eagles in 2012, Oldfield struggled to cement his place in Manly's first grade team and was soon replaced by powerhouse rookie Jorge Taufua. This saw Oldfield only playing in 7 games for the 2012 season.

On 19 June 2012, it was announced that Oldfield had signed a two-year contract with the Sydney Roosters from 2013. Since the announcement, Oldfield was not selected in Manly's first grade team until called up due to an injury to David Williams just before the 2012 NRL Finals. Instead, finding himself in the Sea Eagles New South Wales Cup squad for most of the season.

==== Sydney Roosters ====
Oldfield signed with the Sydney Roosters for 2013. After making his club debut in a 22–24 loss to the Canberra Raiders at Canberra Stadium in round 5 of the 2013 NRL season in which he scored a try, Oldfield found himself playing in the NSW Cup for the Newtown Jets.

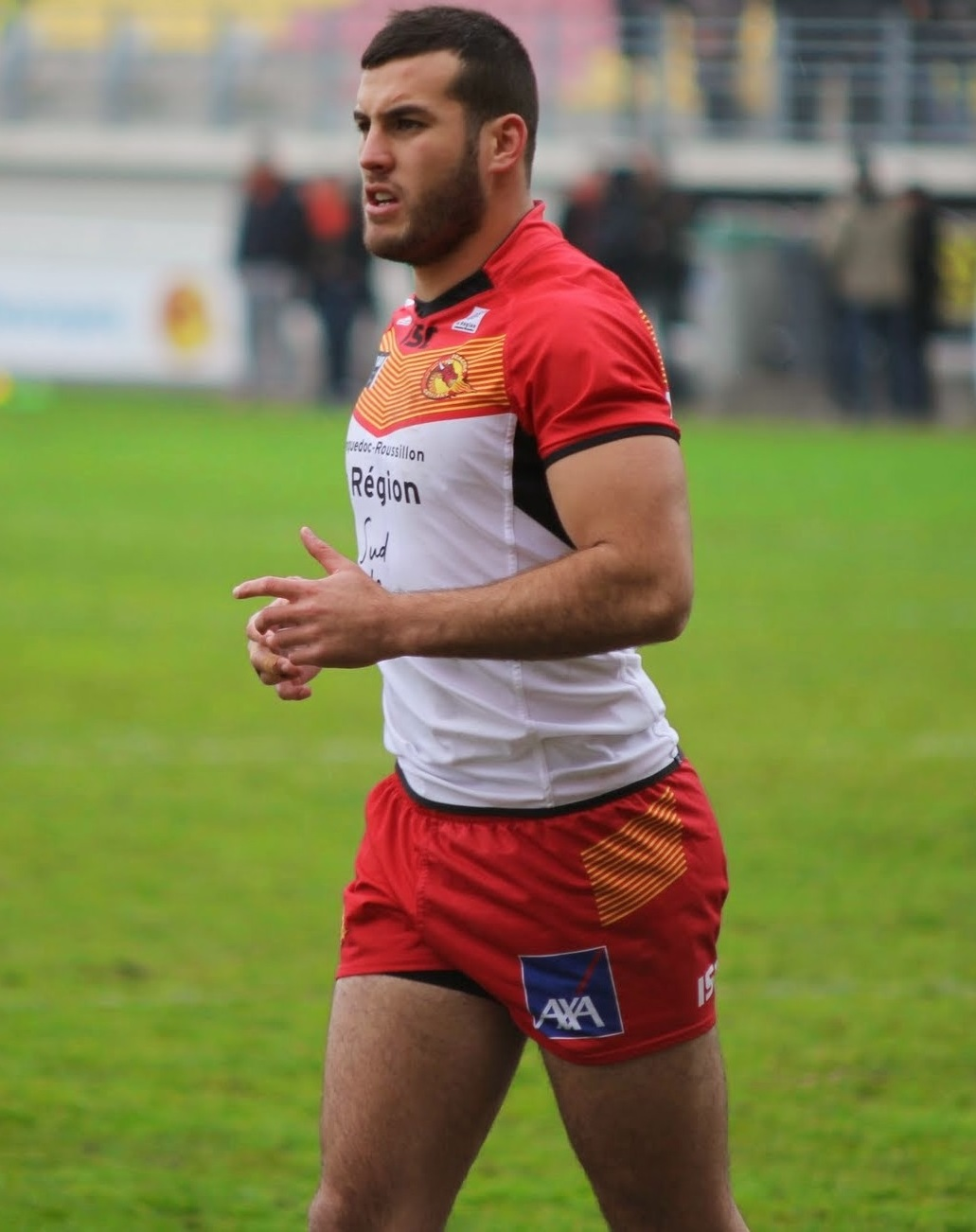
Oldfield playing for the Catalans Dragons in 2014

==== Catalans Dragons ====
In December 2013, Oldfield signed a two-year contract with the Catalans Dragons.

In the 2014 season, Oldfield scored 12 tries in just 17 games. On 14 June 2014 against St Helens R.F.C., he scored a hat trick during Catalans Dragons' 42–0 home win.

==== South Sydney ====
On 6 October 2015, it was announced that Oldfield had signed a one-year contract with the South Sydney Rabbitohs.

In 2016, he made his debut for South Sydney from which he scored two tries in his last three games. Oldfield also spent time playing for Souths feeder club side the North Sydney Bears in the Intrust Super Premiership NSW making 5 appearances and scoring 5 tries.

==== Penrith Panthers ====
Oldfield then signed to the Penrith Panthers signing a one-year deal.

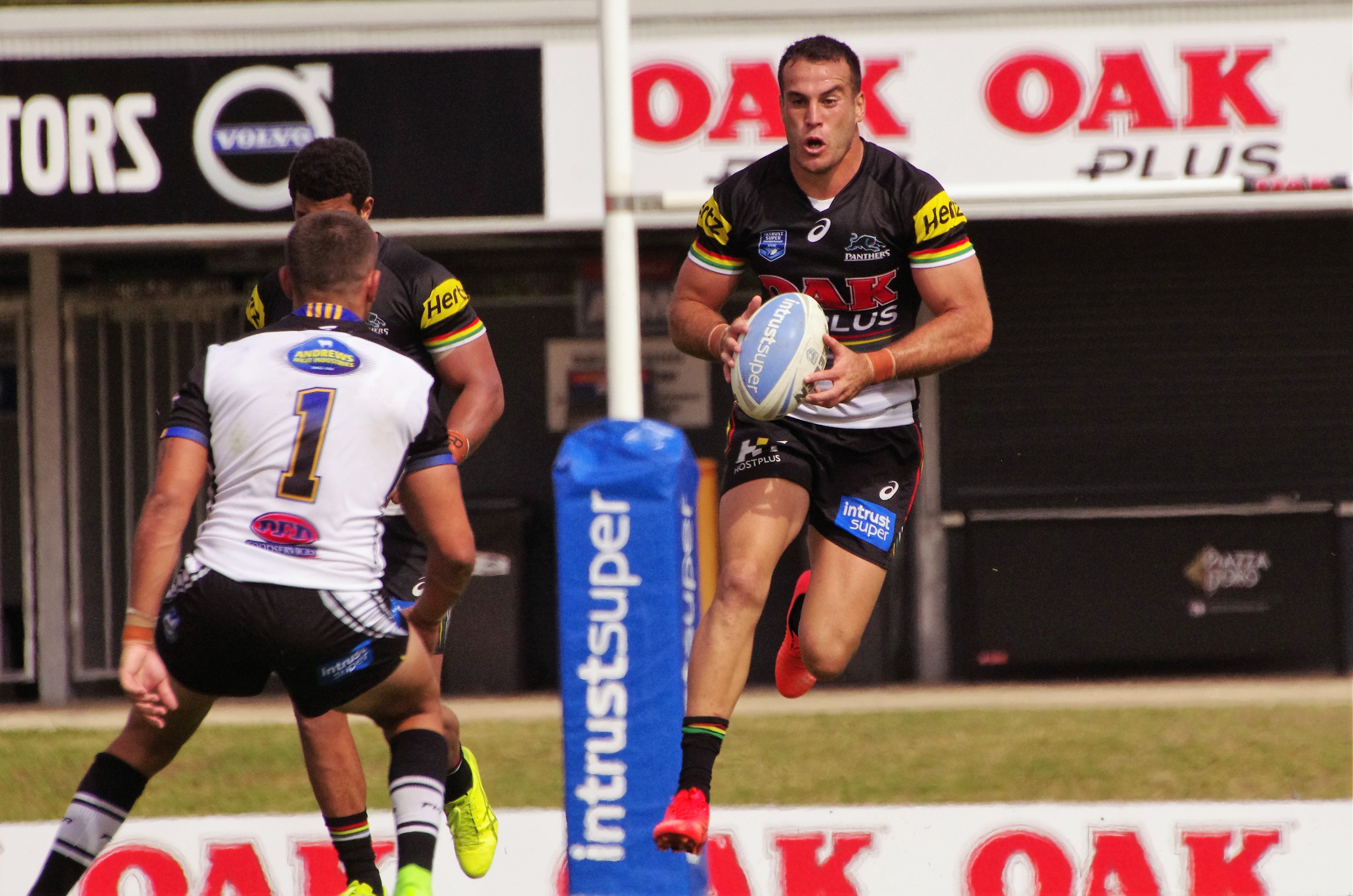
Oldfield playing for the Panthers in 2017

In the same year, he was granted a release to join the Canberra Raiders on a two-year deal.

==== Canberra Raiders ====
Oldfield made 8 appearances for Canberra in the 2018 NRL season and scored 6 tries including a hat-trick against North Queensland.

Oldfield made 9 appearances for Canberra in the 2019 NRL season and scored 5 tries.

Oldfield played six games for Canberra in the 2020 NRL season scoring no tries as the club reached the preliminary final but were defeated by Melbourne.

==== Parramatta Eels ====
In November 2020, he signed a contract to join Parramatta for the 2021 NRL season.

In round 22 of the 2021 NRL season, he made his club debut against one of his former sides, Manly. Oldfield played on the wing in Parramatta's 56–10 loss where he was caught out of position on several occasions leading to Manly tries. On 22 September 2021, Oldfield was released by the Parramatta club.

=== International career ===
On 20 April 2013, Oldfield, who is of Tongan heritage from his mother, made his international debut for Tonga in the Pacific Rugby League International against Samoa at Centrebet Stadium Penrith.

Oldfield earned a second cap in 2016, featuring on the wing against rivals Samoa in the 2016 Pacific Rugby League test match at Pirtek Stadium.
