= Kerrod Holland =

Australian rugby league footballer

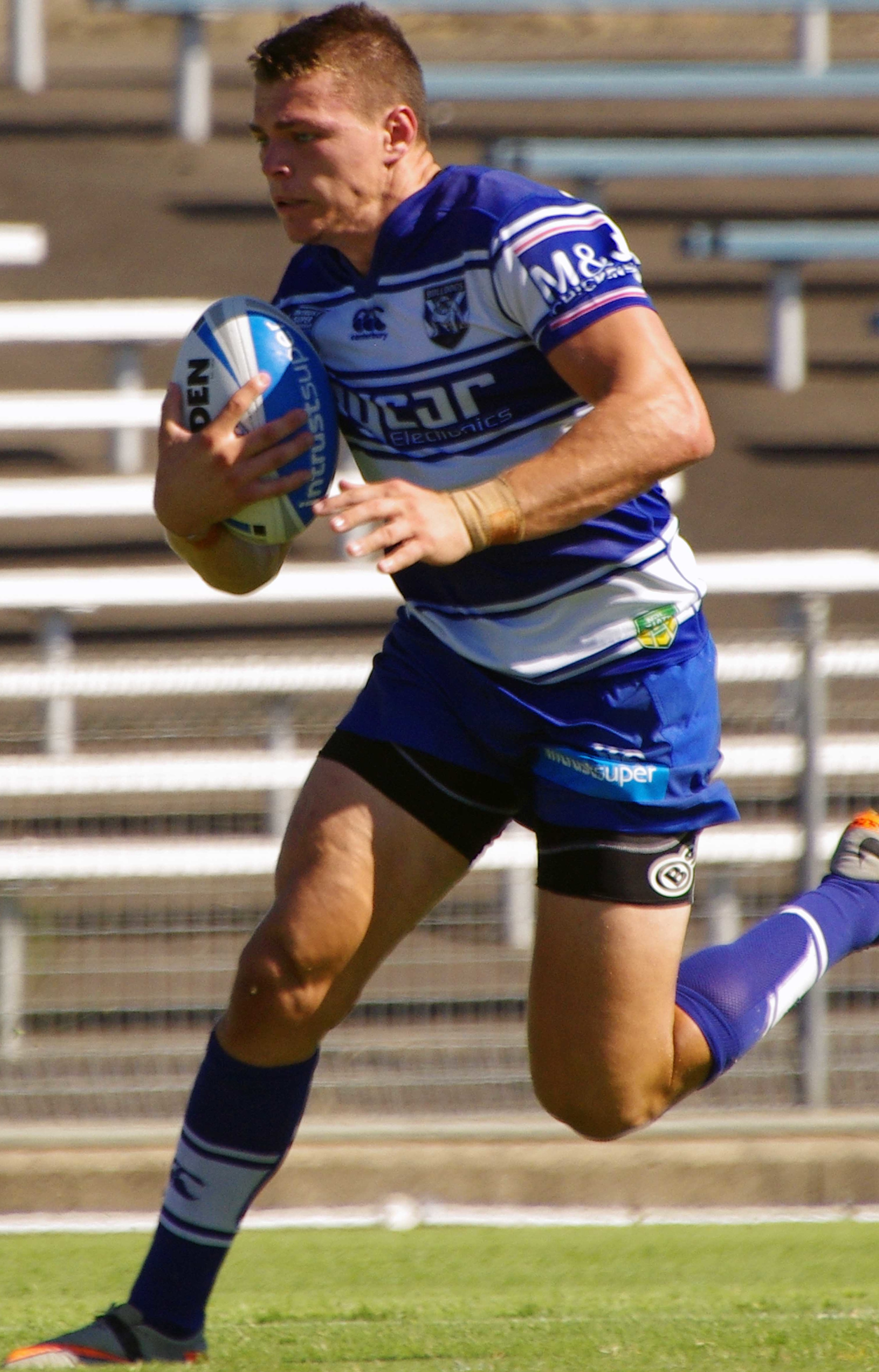

Personal information
- Born: 25 September 1992 (age 34) Singleton, New South Wales, Australia
- Height: 182 cm (6 ft 0 in)
- Weight: 94 kg (14 st 11 lb)

Playing information
- Position: Centre, Wing
Club
Years	Team	Pld	T	G	FG	P
2016–20	Canterbury Bulldogs	71	20	80	0	240
- Source: As of 19 November 2020

Kerrod Holland (born 25 September 1998) is a Former Australian professional rugby league footballer who played as a centre, winger and hooker for the Canterbury-Bankstown Bulldogs in the NRL.

== Background ==
Holland was born in Singleton, New South Wales, Australia.

He played his junior rugby league for the Singleton Greyhounds, before joining the Cessnock Goannas in the Newcastle Rugby League.

== Playing career ==
=== Early career ===
As a 16-year-old, Holland trained with the Newcastle Knights' S. G. Ball Cup team, but decided to finish his electrical apprenticeship instead. After making his name with the Singleton Greyhounds as a halfback, he joined the Cessnock Goannas of the Newcastle Rugby League in 2014, transitioning to fullback and playing in the 2014 Grand Final against the Western Suburbs Rosellas. At the end of the season, he received a call from the new coach of the Newcastle Knights' New South Wales Cup team, Matt Lantry, asking him to train with the side for the 2015 season. Holland went on to play for the Knights in the New South Wales Cup, scoring 18 tries in 16 games, and played at centre in their 2015 New South Wales Cup Grand Final win over the Wyong Roos on 27 September 2015. On the same day, he was named at centre in the 2015 New South Wales Cup Team of the Year. On 3 November 2015, he signed a 2-year contract with the Canterbury-Bankstown Bulldogs starting in 2016.

=== 2016 ===
In round 2 of the 2016 NRL season, Holland made his NRL debut for Canterbury against the Penrith Panthers. After the scores were locked up at 16-all in the last minute of the game from a Moses Mbye try, Holland kicked the conversion after the full-time siren to win the match.

=== 2017 ===
In June, Holland re-signed with Canterbury on a 3-year contract until the end of 2020.

=== 2018 ===
Holland made 20 appearances for Canterbury in 2018 as the club finished in 12th place on the table. At one point, the club were coming last until a late season surge including upset wins over Brisbane, New Zealand and a 38-0 victory over St George saved them from the wooden spoon.

=== 2019 ===
Holland played 14 games for Canterbury in the 2019 NRL season as they finished in 12th position. By the midway point in the year, Canterbury-Bankstown found themselves sitting last on the table and in real danger of finishing with the wooden spoon. However, for the third straight season, Canterbury achieved four upset victories in a row over Penrith, the Wests Tigers, South Sydney and Parramatta who were all competing for a place in the finals series and were higher on the table.

=== 2020 ===
On 1 September, Holland announced he was retiring from rugby league at the end of the 2020 NRL season after not being offered a new contract by Canterbury-Bankstown.

== Post playing ==
After retiring Holland began a coaching career in Group 21 rugby league for the Singleton Greyhounds.
