= Shannon Boyd =

Australia international rugby league footballer

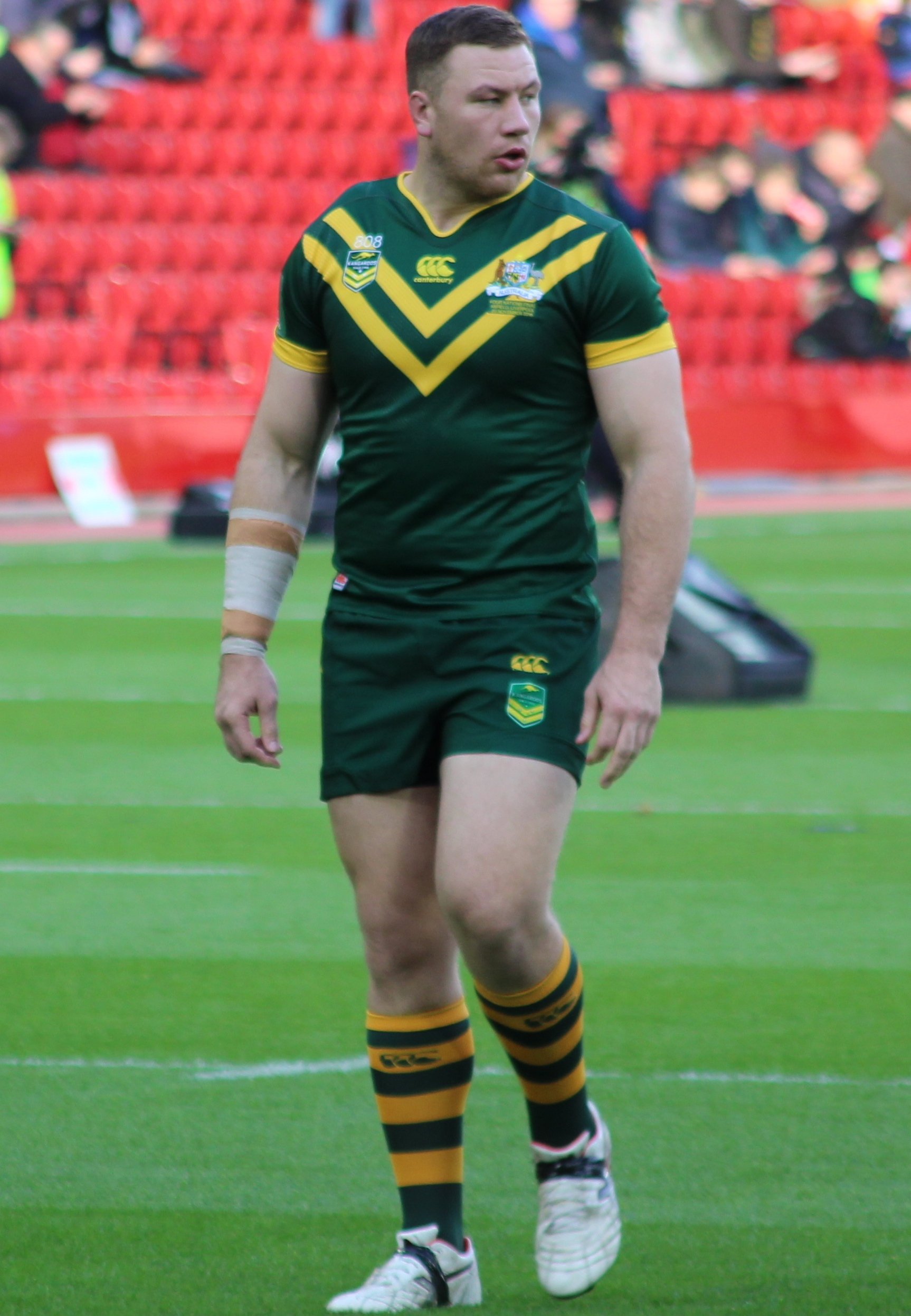

Personal information
- Born: 9 September 1992 (age 34) Goulburn, New South Wales, Australia
- Height: 194 cm (6 ft 4 in)
- Weight: 122 kg (19 st 3 lb)

Playing information
- Position: Prop, Second-row
Club
Years	Team	Pld	T	G	FG	P
2014–18	Canberra Raiders	111	9	0	0	36
2019–20	Gold Coast Titans	14	0	0	0	0
	Total	125	9	0	0	36
Representative
Years	Team	Pld	T	G	FG	P
2016	NSW Country	1	0	0	0	0
2016	Australia	5	0	0	0	0
- Source: As of 18 November 2020

Shannon Boyd (born 9 September 1992) is a former Australian professional rugby league footballer who last played as a prop for the Gold Coast Titans in the NRL, and has played for Australia at international level.

Boyd played for the Canberra Raiders and the Gold Coast Titans in the National Rugby League. He played for NSW Country in 2016.

== Playing career ==
Boyd was born in Goulburn, New South Wales, Australia.

He played his junior football for the Cowra Magpies before being signed by the Canberra Raiders. He played for their NYC team from 2010 to 2012. Boyd played for the New South Wales Under 18s team and, in 2012, the Under 20s team.

=== 2014 ===
In Round 1, Boyd made his NRL debut for the Raiders off the interchange bench against the North Queensland Cowboys in a 28–22 loss at 1300SMILES Stadium. In Round 6 against the Newcastle Knights, Boyd scored his first NRL try in a 26–12 loss at Canberra Stadium. On 23 April, Boyd re-signed with the Raiders, keeping him at the club till the end of the 2017 season. He scored one try from his 24 appearances in his debut season and was named the Raiders Rookie of the Year at the Meninga Medal presentation night.

=== 2015 ===
In May, Boyd was selected as 18th man for New South Wales Country. In Round 22 against the Wests Tigers, he scored his first career double in the first half of the match in the Raiders' 20–18 loss at Canberra Stadium. He finished the season with 20 matches and 5 tries. He was named in the Prime Minister's XIII train-on squad but was later ruled out due to injury. On 27 October, he re-signed with the Raiders on a 3-year contract.

=== 2016 ===
In the pre-season, Boyd was named in the Raiders' Auckland Nines squad. On 8 May, Boyd started at prop for New South Wales Country against New South Wales City. During the season, Boyd was being recognised as being one of the in-form props of the competition, showing some great performances up front to lead the Raiders to a 10-match winning streak towards the finals. Boyd played in 26 matches and scored 2 tries for the Raiders. He was rewarded for his big season by being selected in the 24-man Australian Kangaroos squad for the Four Nations. On 15 October, Boyd made his international debut for Australia against New Zealand, where he started at prop in the 26–6 win at nib Stadium in Perth. Boyd played in 4 matches of the tournament including playing off the interchange bench in the Kangaroos 34-8 Final win against New Zealand at Anfield.

=== 2017 ===
In April 2017, Boyd was selected to fill in the interchange bench for the Kangaroos after Raiders teammate Josh Papalii was axed for drink-driving but later was selected as 18th man after coach Mal Meninga opted to select Jake Trbojevic for the void bench spot in their 2017 ANZAC Test clash against New Zealand. Boyd had a consistent 2017 NRL season, playing in 23 matches for the Raiders.

=== 2018 ===
On 16 May, Boyd has signed a 4-year deal with the Gold Coast Titans starting at 2019.

=== 2019 ===
On 5 August, Boyd was ruled out for the rest of the 2019 NRL season after suffering a shoulder injury which required surgery. Boyd made a total of 13 appearances for the Gold Coast in his first season at the club.

=== 2020 ===
Boyd announced his retirement from the NRL due to injuries.

== Post playing ==
In December 2024, Boyd had signed on to play as coach-player of the Canowindra Tigers who played in the Woodbridge Cup competition.
