= Nick Cotric =

Australia & Serbia international rugby league footballer

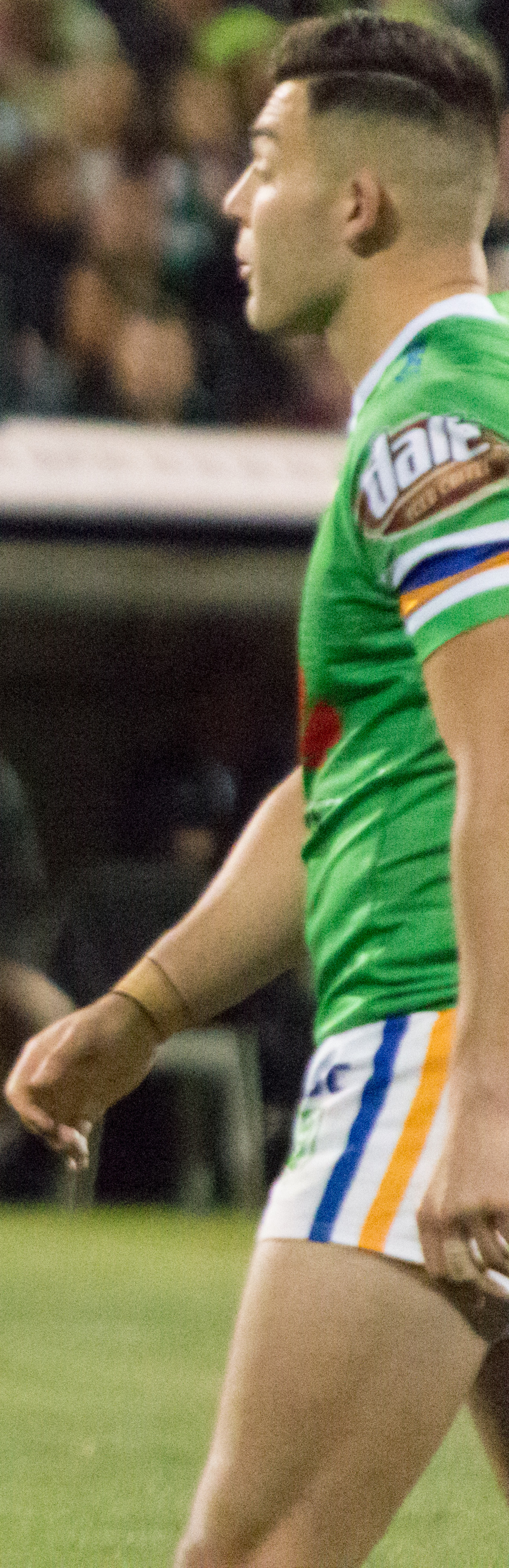

Personal information
- Full name: Nikola Čotrić
- Born: 18 November 1998 (age 28) Cooma, New South Wales, Australia
- Height: 6 ft 1 in (1.85 m)
- Weight: 15 st 6 lb (98 kg)

Playing information
- Position: Wing, Centre
Club
Years	Team	Pld	T	G	FG	P
2017–20	Canberra Raiders	93	46	0	0	184
2021	Canterbury Bulldogs	14	3	0	0	12
2022–24	Canberra Raiders	42	14	0	0	56
2025–26	Catalans Dragons	50	10	0	0	40
2027–	Leeds Rhinos	0	0	0	0	0
	Total	199	73	0	0	292
Representative
Years	Team	Pld	T	G	FG	P
2018	Prime Minister's XIII	1	1	0	0	4
2019	New South Wales	1	0	0	0	0
2019	Australia	2	0	0	0	0
2024	Serbia	2	2	0	0	8
- Source: As of 22 November 2026

Nikola Čotrić (Serbian: Никола Чотрић, romanized: Nikola Čotrić; born 18 November 1998) is a professional rugby league footballer who plays as a winger for the Leeds Rhinos in the Super League, and has played for both Australia and Serbia at international level

He previously played for the Canterbury-Bankstown Bulldogs in the NRL and has played for at representative level for New South Wales in the State of Origin series as well as one game for the Prime Minister's XIII in 2018.

== Background ==
Cotric was born in Cooma, New South Wales, and is of Serbian descent.

He played his junior rugby league for the Valley Dragons.

== Playing career ==
=== Early years ===
In 2016, Cotric was a member of the Canberra Raiders' NYC team, playing 21 games primarily at centre. In August 2016, Cotric re-signed with the Canberra outfit on a two-year contract until the end of 2018, In 2016, Cotric played for the Australian Schoolboys. On 5 September 2016, Cotric was named at centre in the 2016 NYC Team of the Year.

=== 2017 ===
Before the season started, Cotric was groomed to fill in the right-wing flank to fill the void made by the departure of Edrick Lee. In February 2017, Cotric was named in the Raiders 2017 NRL Auckland Nines squad. In Round 1 of the 2017 NRL season, Cotric made his NRL debut for the Canberra Raiders against the North Queensland Cowboys, playing on the wing in the 20-16 Golden Point loss at 1300SMILES Stadium. In Round 3 against the Wests Tigers, Cotric scored his first NRL career try in the 46-6 win at Canberra Stadium. On 13 September 2017, Cotric was awarded with Canberra's Rookie of the year at the Mal Meninga Medal Awards night. On 27 September 2017, Cotric received the Rookie of the Year award at the 2017 Dally M Awards night. Even though the Raiders didn’t make the top 8 into the finals, Cotric capped off a great debut season with him playing in all of the Canberra clubs 24 matches and scoring 16 tries in the 2017 NRL season. On 3 November 2017, Cotric extended his contract with the capital club to the end of the 2020 season. On 19 December 2017, Cotric was selected in Brad Fittler’s emerging New South Wales squad.

=== 2018 ===
On 28 May 2018, Cotric was named as 18th man for New South Wales for Game 1 of the 2018 State of Origin series. Cotric would play some matches at fullback towards the end of the season, filling in for the suspended Jack Wighton. Cotric finished the 2018 NRL season with him playing in all of Canberra's 24 matches and scoring 12 tries. On 6 October 2018, Cotric played for the Prime Minister’s XIII against Papua New Guinea, playing on the wing and scoring a try in the 34-18 win at Port Moresby. At the end of the season, statistics showed that Cotric was on top of tackle break count with 149, pipping the Sydney Roosters Grand Final winning fullback James Tedesco by two.

=== 2019 ===
After a good start to the season, Cotric was selected to represent New South Wales in the 2019 State of Origin series. He played in game 1, which Queensland won 18-14, but was ruled out for Game 2 with an ankle injury.

In Round 17, Cotric was sent off for a dangerous lifting tackle on St George centre Tim Lafai, and suspended for three matches.

Cotric played a total of 22 games for Canberra in the 2019 NRL season as the club reached their first grand final in 25 years. He played on the wing in the 2019 NRL Grand Final as they were defeated by the Sydney Roosters.

On 7 October, Cotric was named in the Australian side for the Oceania Cup fixtures. He made his Test debut in Australia’s win over New Zealand at WIN Stadium, Wollongong, and also played in Australia’s following match, an unexpected loss to Tonga at Eden Park in Auckland.

=== 2020 ===
In round 15 of the 2020 NRL season, Cotric scored two tries for Canberra in a 36-16 victory over the Gold Coast at Cbus Super Stadium. This followed on from the prior in round 14 where he scored two tries against Brisbane.

On 22 July 2020, the Canterbury-Bankstown Bulldogs announced the signing of Cotric on a three-year deal starting in the 2021 season and rumoured to be worth around $600,000 per season.

Cotric played 23 games for Canberra scoring 14 tries, finishing as the club's top try scorer. In his final game for Canberra which was the preliminary final, he scored two tries in a 30-10 loss against Melbourne.

=== 2021 ===
Cotric made his debut for Canterbury-Bankstown in round 1 of the 2021 NRL season against Newcastle which ended in a 32-16 defeat.

On 30 June, it was announced that Cotric would miss the remainder of the 2021 NRL season with a toe injury.

On 15 December, it was announced he would return to Canberra on a three-year deal starting in 2022.

=== 2022 ===
In round 20 of the 2022 NRL season, Cotric scored two tries for Canberra in a 36-24 victory over the Gold Coast. In round 21, Cotric was sent to the sin bin for a dangerous high tackle during Canberra's loss to Penrith. Cotric played a total of 21 games for the club in the 2022 NRL season including both of their finals matches against Melbourne and Parramatta.

=== 2023 ===
Cotric played a total of 13 matches for Canberra in the 2023 NRL season as the club finished 8th on the table and qualified for the finals. Cotric played in Canberra's golden point extra-time elimination final loss to Newcastle.

=== 2024 ===
In June 2024, it was reported that he had signed for Catalans Dragons in the Super League on a three-year deal. Cotric was limited to only eight appearances with Canberra in the 2024 NRL season where he scored four tries.

=== 2025 ===
In round 1 of the 2025 Super League season, Cotric made his club debut for Catalans in their upset loss against Hull F.C..

=== 2026 ===
On 3 September 2026, it was reported that he had signed for Leeds Rhinos on a four-year deal.

== Statistics ==
Season	Club	Games	Tries	Pts
2017	Canberra Raiders	24	16	64
2018	Canberra Raiders	24	12	48
2019	Canberra Raiders	22	4	16
2020	Canberra Raiders	23	14	56
2021	Canterbury-Bankstown Bulldogs	14	3	12
2022	Canberra Raiders	21	7	28
2023	Canberra Raiders	13	3	12
2024	Canberra Raiders	8	4	16
2025	Catalans Dragons	25	5	20
2026	Catalans Dragons	23	5	20
2027	Leeds Rhinos	0	0	0
	Totals	183	70	280

*denotes season still competing
