= Dunamis Lui =

Samoa international rugby league footballer

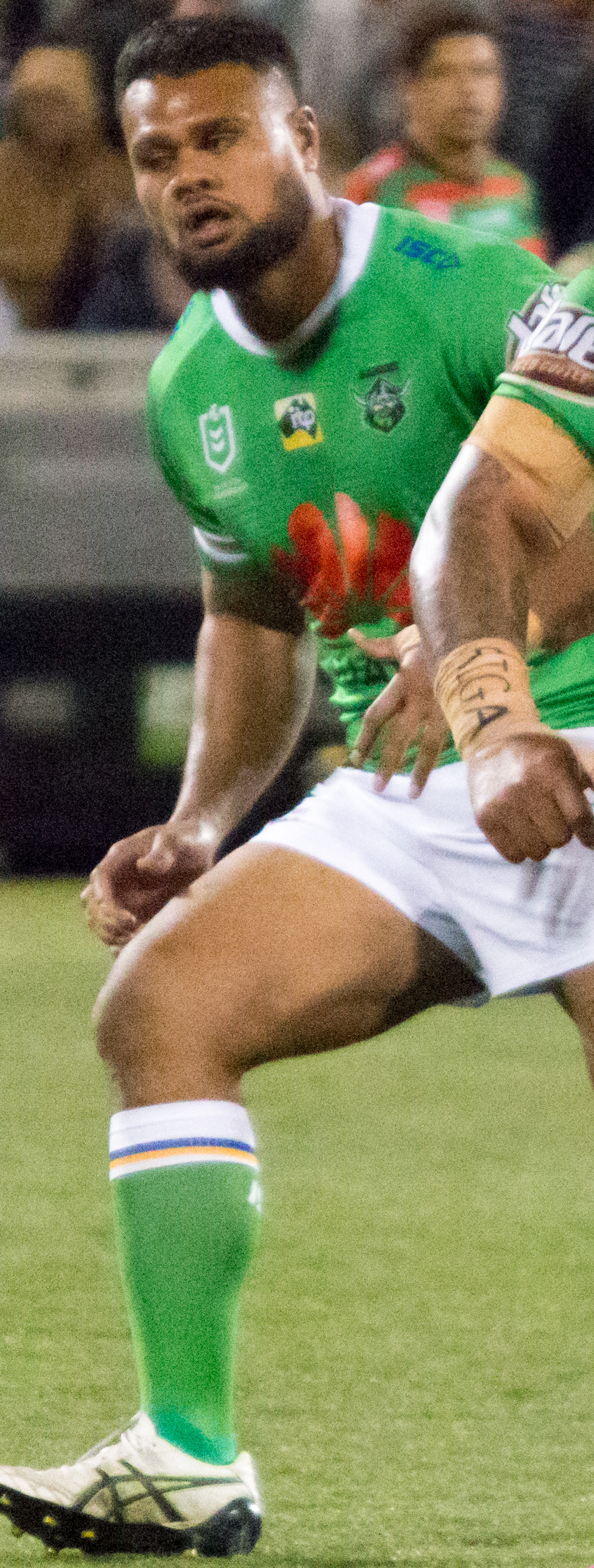

Personal information
- Full name: Dunamis Lui
- Born: 16 February 1990 (age 36) Brisbane, Queensland, Australia
- Height: 180 cm (5 ft 11 in)
- Weight: 110 kg (17 st 5 lb)

Playing information
- Position: Prop, Lock
Club
Years	Team	Pld	T	G	FG	P
2010–13	Brisbane Broncos	32	1	0	0	4
2014–15	Manly Sea Eagles	38	1	0	0	4
2016	St. George Illawarra	10	0	0	0	0
2017–21	Canberra Raiders	89	3	0	0	12
2022	New Zealand Warriors	4	0	0	0	0
	Total	173	5	0	0	20
Representative
Years	Team	Pld	T	G	FG	P
2014–19	Samoa	6	0	0	0	0
2020	Queensland	1	0	0	0	0
- Source: As of 4 June 2021

Dunamis Lui (born 16 February 1990) is a Samoa international rugby league footballer plays as a prop and lock for the Redcliffe Dolphins in the Hostplus Cup.

Lui previously played for the Brisbane Broncos, Manly Warringah Sea Eagles, St. George Illawarra Dragons, Canberra Raiders and the New Zealand Warriors in the National Rugby League, and at representative level for Queensland in the State of Origin series.

== Background ==
Lui was born in Brisbane, Queensland, Australia. He is of Samoan descent.

Lui played his junior football for the Aspley Devils and Brisbane Brothers before being signed by the Brisbane Broncos.

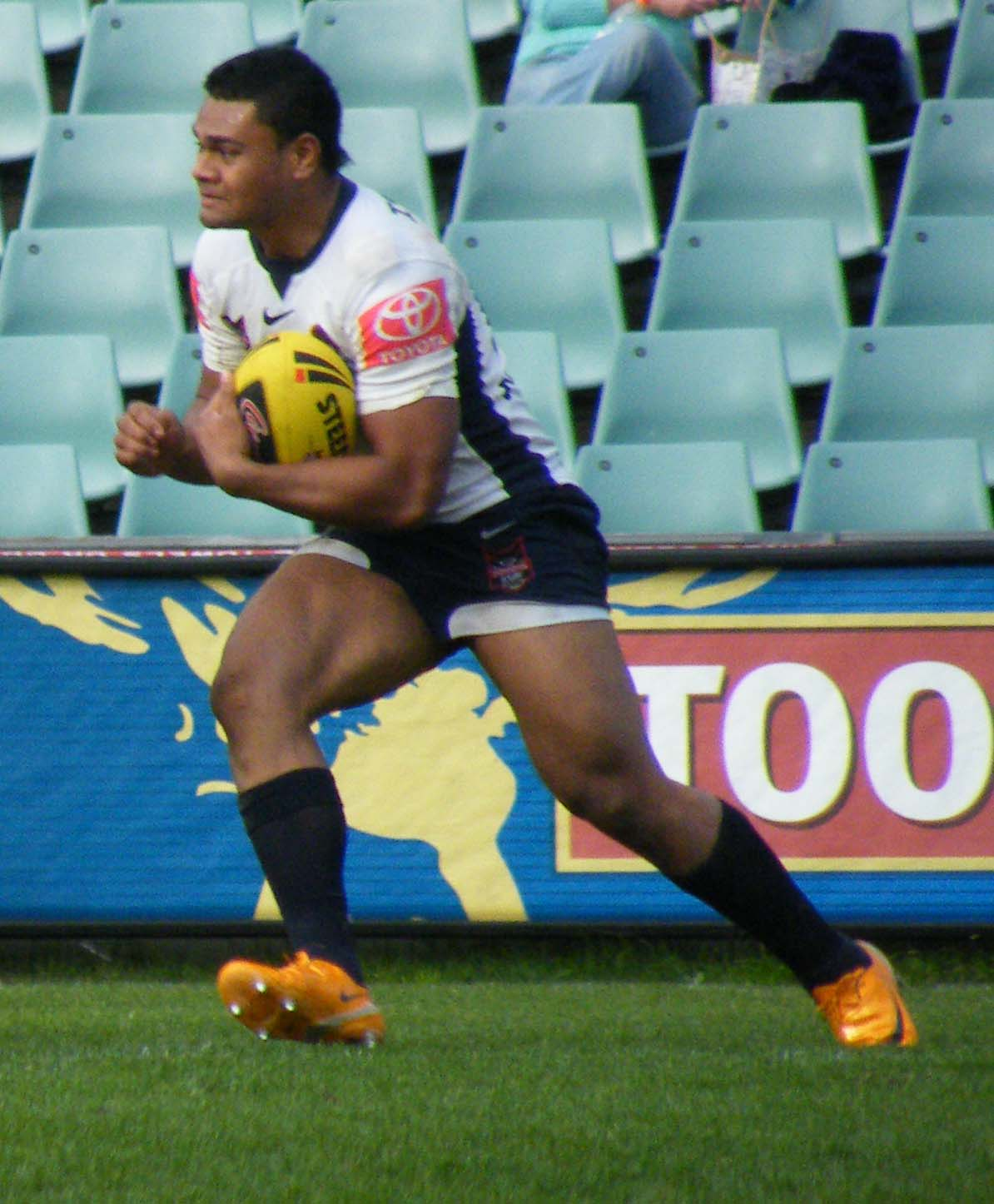
Lui playing for the Broncos in 2009

Lui played for the Broncos NYC team from 2008 to 2010. Lui has played for the Queensland Schoolboys team. Lui has played for the AIS team.

== Playing career ==
=== 2010 ===
In round 5 of the 2010 NRL season, Lui made his NRL debut for the Brisbane Broncos against the St. George Illawarra Dragons off the interchange bench in the Broncos 34–16 loss at WIN Stadium. In round 6 against the Cronulla-Sutherland Sharks, Lui scored his first NRL career try in the Broncos 44–16 win at Suncorp Stadium. Lui finished his debut year in the NRL with him playing in 4 matches and scoring a try for the Brisbane Broncos.

=== 2011 ===
On 12 May 2011, Lui re-signed with Brisbane on a two-year contract to the end of the 2013 season. Lui finished the 2011 NRL season with him playing in 6 matches for the Broncos.

=== 2012 ===
Lui finished the 2012 NRL season with him played in 9 matches for Brisbane.

=== 2013 ===
On 28 August 2013, Lui signed a one-year contract with the Manly-Warringah Sea Eagles starting in 2014. Lui played in 13 matches in his last year for the Brisbane Broncos in the 2013 NRL season.

=== 2014 ===
In round 1 of the 2014 NRL season, Lui made his club debut for the Manly-Warringah Sea Eagles against the Melbourne Storm off the interchange bench in the club's 23–22 loss at Brookvale Oval.

In May 2014, Lui played for Samoa in the 2014 Pacific Rugby League International against Fiji off the interchange bench in Samoa's 32–16 win at Penrith Stadium. In round 17 against the Canterbury-Bankstown Bulldogs, Lui scored his first club try for Manly-Warringah in the 23–16 loss at ANZ Stadium, Lui scoring his first try since round 6 of the 2010 NRL season for the Brisbane Broncos. Lui finished off his first year with the Manly-Warringah Sea Eagles with him playing in 21 matches and scoring a try in the 2014 NRL season. On 7 October 2014, Lui was selected in Samoa 24-man squad for the 2014 Rugby League Four Nations. Lui played in 2 matches in the tournament.

=== 2015 ===
On 23 January, Lui was named in Manly's 2015 Auckland Nines squad. On 2 May, Lui played for Samoa in the 2015 Polynesian Cup battle against Tonga, playing off the interchange bench in Samoa's 18–16 win at Cbus Super Stadium. On 16 September, Lui signed a two-year contract with St. George Illawarra starting in 2016. Lui finished his last year with the Manly-Warringah Sea Eagles with him playing in 17 matches in the 2015 NRL season.

=== 2016 ===
In February, Lui played for St. George Illawarra in the 2016 NRL Auckland Nines. In round 1 of the 2016 NRL season, Lui made his club debut for St. George Illawarra against the Melbourne Storm, playing off the interchange bench in St. George's 18–16 loss at AAMI Park.

On 9 November 2016, Lui signed a two-year deal with the Canberra Raiders commencing in 2017.

=== 2018 ===
Lui signed a further three-year extension on 8 August 2018, keeping him at the Canberra Raiders until the end of the 2021 season.

=== 2019 ===
Lui made 27 appearances for Canberra in the 2019 NRL season as the club reached their first grand final in 25 years. Lui played from the bench in the 2019 NRL Grand Final in which Canberra were defeated by the Sydney Roosters at ANZ Stadium.

=== 2020 ===
Lui played 20 games for Canberra in the 2020 NRL season, including all three of Canberra's finals matches. At the end of the season, he made a long-awaited State of Origin debut for Queensland in the second match of the series, replacing the injured Christian Welch in a 34-10 loss to New South Wales.

=== 2021 ===
Lui made a total of 11 appearances for Canberra in the 2021 NRL season which saw the club miss the finals. Following the end of the season, Lui was released by Canberra.

=== 2022 ===
In 2022, Lui joined the New Zealand Warriors. Lui made a total only four appearances for the New Zealand club as they finished 15th on the table. On 6 September, the club announced Lui was one of 15 players who were being released.
