= Sam Williams (rugby league) =

Australian rugby league player (born 1991)

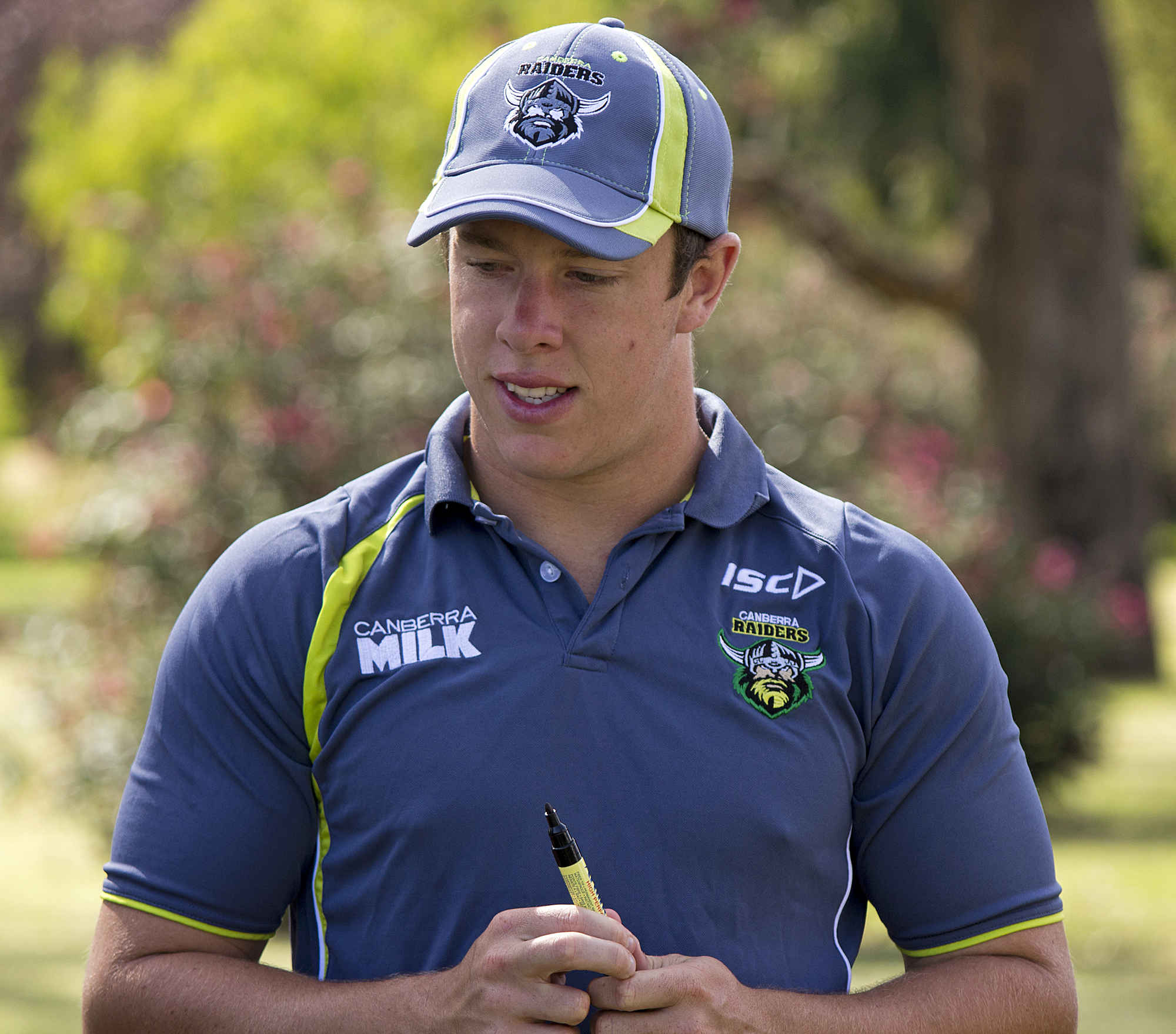

Personal information
- Born: 18 March 1991 (age 35) Cooma, New South Wales, Australia
- Height: 180 cm (5 ft 11 in)
- Weight: 87 kg (13 st 10 lb)

Playing information
- Position: Halfback, Five-eighth
Club
Years	Team	Pld	T	G	FG	P
2011–13	Canberra Raiders	42	8	0	0	32
2014	St. George Illawarra	4	0	0	0	0
2014	Catalans Dragons	12	4	21	0	58
2015–16	Canberra Raiders	24	4	0	2	18
2017	Wakefield Trinity	24	6	26	0	76
2018–21	Canberra Raiders	37	8	45	4	126
	Total	143	30	92	6	310
Representative
Years	Team	Pld	T	G	FG	P
2013	NSW Country	1	0	0	0	0
2013	NSW Residents	1	1	0	0	4
- Source: As of 9 January 2024

Sam Williams (born 18 March 1991) is an Australian professional rugby league coach who is the head coach of the Northern Pride in the Queensland Cup and a former professional rugby league footballer who last played as a halfback or five-eighth for the Canberra Raiders in the NRL.

In September 2025 Williams was announced as the new coach of the Northern Pride RLFC in the Queensland Cup after a poor season from the team.

He previously played for Canberra in two separate spells and the St. George Illawarra Dragons in the National Rugby League, and for the Catalans Dragons and Wakefield Trinity in the Super League.

== Background ==
Williams was born in Cooma, New South Wales, Australia.

== National Youth Competition ==
A Cooma Colts junior, Williams boarded at St Gregory's College for his secondary schooling and played for the Junior Kangaroos in 2010.

Williams debuted for the Canberra Raiders in the National Youth Competition in 2009 and was selected in the team of the year in 2010, he was also previously the National Youth Competition Captain.

== NRL career ==
Williams has played 65 first grade matches for the Canberra Raiders and 4 for the St. George Illawarra Dragons. He has scored 12 first grade tries. Sam made his NRL début for the Canberra Raiders against the Cronulla-Sutherland Sharks in round 1 of the 2011 NRL season due to an injury sustained by then Canberra Raiders first choice halfback Matt Orford. Williams impressed on his début with a strong all round performance that earned him the man of the match award. In round 6 of the season Orford was again ruled out through injury, giving Williams another opportunity in first grade, in this game against the North Queensland Cowboys Williams was sent to the sin bin for a professional foul. Later in the season Williams managed to cement his spot as the first choice number of seven.

In July 2013, Williams signed a one-year contract with the St. George Illawarra Dragons starting in 2014.

In June 2014, after only being selected for 4 games in 13 rounds for the St. George Illawarra Dragons, Williams joined the Catalans Dragons in the Super League on a 1-year contract effective immediately.

He returned to the Canberra in 2015 on a two-year deal.

In round 2 of the 2016 NRL season, Williams wore a special James Bond themed jersey with the number 007 on the back. He would kick the match winning field goal in that game with the Canberra club winning 21–20.

In September 2016, Williams was named at halfback in the 2016 Intrust Super Premiership NSW Team of the Year.

Later in 2016, Sam rejected a new contract offer with the Canberra and signed a one-year contract with English Super League club Wakefield Trinity for the 2017 season, after which he re-joined Canberra on a 2-year deal.

Williams made 10 appearances for Canberra in the 2019 NRL season but spent most of the year playing for Canberra's feeder club side Mounties in the Canterbury Cup NSW competition. Williams played in Mounties elimination final loss against Newtown at Campbelltown Stadium.

On 5 November 2019, Williams signed a two-year contract extension with Canberra.

In the 2020 NRL season he made a larger impact on Canberra, captaining them to a win in the final game of the regular season against the Cronulla-Sutherland Sharks.

In round 17 of the 2021 NRL season, he scored two tries for Canberra in a 30–16 victory over an Origin depleted Manly side.

In round 15 of the 2022 NRL season, it was announced Williams would leave the Canberra Raiders having been unable to make it back into the top grade side. Williams played 8 games, scored 3 tries and kicked 15 goals for the Raiders NSW Cup side that year.

== Post Playing ==
Williams retired from playing in 2022 and went on to become the captain-coach of the Queanbeyan Kangaroos in the Canberra Raiders Cup. On 25 September 2025, Northern Pride RLFC announced that Williams would become their coach for the 2026-27 seasons.

== Statistics ==
Year	Team	Games	Tries	Goals	FGs	Pts
2011	Canberra Raiders	18	2			8
2012	Canberra Raiders	15	4			16
2013	Canberra Raiders	9	2			8
2014	St. George Illawarra Dragons	4				
2014	Catalans Dragons	12	4	21		58
2015	Canberra Raiders	16	3		1	13
2016	Canberra Raiders	8	1		1	5
2017	Wakefield Trinity	24	6	26		76
2018	Canberra Raiders	14	1	25	2	56
2019	Canberra Raiders	10	2		2	10
2020	Canberra Raiders	1	1	5		14
2021	Canberra Raiders	12	4	15		46
	Totals	143	30	92	6	310

Stats correct to the end of the 2021 season
