= Ata Hingano =

Tonga international rugby league footballer

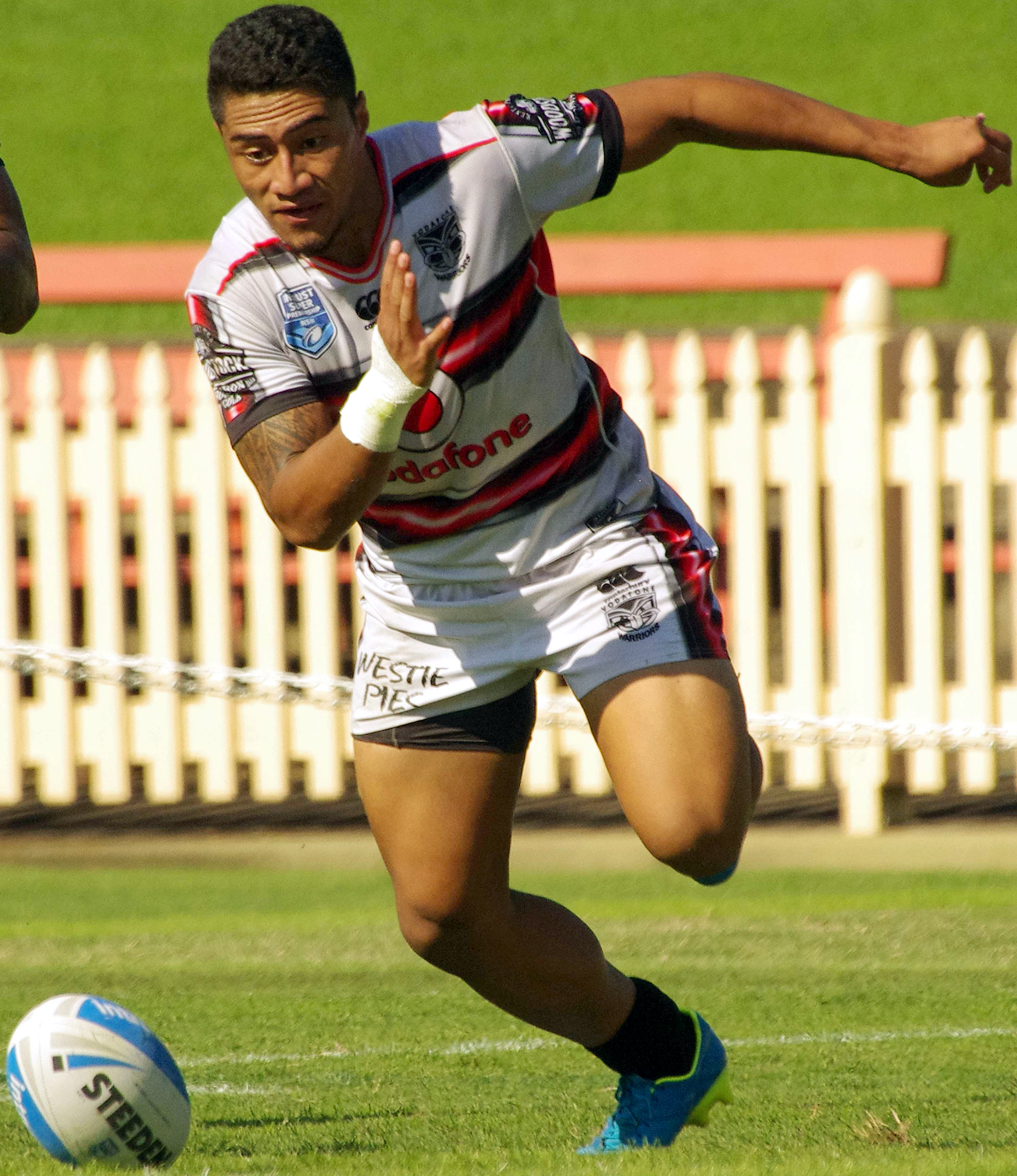

Personal information
- Full name: Mafoa'aeata Hingano
- Born: 11 March 1997 (age 29) Auckland, New Zealand
- Height: 6 ft 0 in (1.83 m)
- Weight: 14 st 7 lb (92 kg)

Playing information
- Position: Five-eighth, Halfback, Hooker
Club
Years	Team	Pld	T	G	FG	P
2016–17	New Zealand Warriors	15	1	1	0	6
2018	Canberra Raiders	9	0	0	0	0
2021	Salford Red Devils	5	1	0	0	4
2022	Leigh Centurions	18	4	0	0	16
2022(loan)	→ York City Knights	4	1	0	0	4
2023–26	York Knights	92	21	14	1	104
2027–	Oldham RLFC	0	0	0	0	0
	Total	143	28	15	1	134
Representative
Years	Team	Pld	T	G	FG	P
2017–18	Tonga	8	2	9	0	26
- Source: As of 17 November 2026

Mafoa'aeata "Ata" Hingano (born 11 March 1997) is a Tonga international rugby league footballer who plays as a scrum-half, stand-off or hooker for Oldham RLFC in the RFL Championship.

He has played for the New Zealand Warriors and the Canberra Raiders in the NRL. Hingano also played for the Mackay Cutters in the Queensland Cup, trained with the North Queensland Cowboys in the National Rugby League, and played for Salford Red Devils in the Super League.

== Background ==
Hingano was born in Auckland, New Zealand, and is of Tongan descent. He attended Pakūranga College.

== Playing career ==
=== Early career ===
He played his junior rugby league for the Pakuranga Jaguars, before being signed by the New Zealand Warriors.

From 2014 to 2016, Hingano played for the New Zealand Warriors' NYC team. On 12 December 2014, he re-signed with the Warriors on a 2-year contract until the end of 2016. In 2015 he also spent some time with the Warriors' NSW Cup team.

=== 2016 ===
In 2016, Hingano played for the Warriors at the 2016 Auckland Nines. He also spent some time with the Warriors' Under-20's and Intrust Super Premiership NSW teams.

On 7 May, Hingano played at halfback for the Junior Kiwis against the Junior Kangaroos, scoring two tries in the Kiwis' 20–34 loss. In round 24 of the 2016 NRL season, he made his NRL debut for the Warriors against the North Queensland Cowboys, coming on at five eighth from the interchange bench.

=== 2017 ===
Hingano signed a three-year contract with the Warriors, until the end of the 2020 season.

At the end of the year, he was selected to play for Tonga in the 2017 Rugby League World Cup. He was the starting halfback in every match of the tournament including their semi-final loss to England.

=== 2018 ===
On 28 February 2018, Hingano was released by the New Zealand Warriors to join the Canberra Raiders.

He also retained his place in the Tonga squad as halfback for their historic first Test match against the Australian Kangaroos on October 20, but left the field with a dislocated shoulder early in the match.

=== 2019 ===
Hingano made no appearances for Canberra in the 2019 NRL season. Hingano instead played for Canberra's feeder club Mounties in the Canterbury Cup NSW competition. Hingano played for Mounties in their elimination final loss against Newtown at Campbelltown Stadium.

On 13 October, it was announced that Hingano had been released by Canberra. However, it was later revealed that Hingano would remain with the club as part of the development squad in 2020, before his release was once again confirmed two weeks later.

On 16 December, he signed with the Mackay Cutters for the 2020 Queensland Cup season.

=== 2020 ===
Hingano played just one game for the Cutters in 2020 before the season was canceled due to the COVID-19 pandemic. In November, Hingano joined the North Queensland Cowboys for pre-season training on a train-and-trial deal ahead of the 2021 NRL season.

=== 2021 ===
On 15 June 2021 it was reported that he had signed for Salford in the Super League. On 19 November 2021 it was announced that Hingano had signed for Leigh in the Betfred Championship for the 2022 season.

=== 2022 ===
On 10 July, Hingano scored two tries for Leigh in a 66–0 victory over Workington Town. In July, Hingano joined RFL Championship side York RLFC on loan for the remainder of the season. This was later upgraded into a three-year permanent deal.

=== 2025 ===
On 7 June, Hingano played in York's 1895 Cup final victory over Featherstone in a season where York earned promotion to English Super League.

=== 2026 ===
Hingano started as stand off and starred for York RLFC in the first match of the English Super League season as they defeated the 2025 championship winners Hull Kingston Rovers 19–18 with a 30-metre left footed drop goal,it was the first drop goal of his career.

On 6 October 2026 it was reported that he had signed for Oldham RLFC in the RFL Championship
