= List of National Rugby League records =

This page details first-grade rugby league records from the National Rugby League (1998–) and its predecessors, the New South Wales Rugby Football League (1908–1994), the Australian Rugby League (1995–1997), and the Super League (1997). First-grade games played between premiership teams are included, but not mid-week competitions, pre-season warm-up games or NRL Nines games.

== Team records ==
=== Premierships ===
| Titles | Club | Seasons |
|---|---|---|
| 21 | South Sydney Rabbitohs | 1908, 1909, 1914, 1918, 1925, 1926, 1927, 1928, 1929, 1931, 1932, 1950, 1951, 1953, 1954, 1955, 1967, 1968, 1970, 1971, 2014 |
| 16 | Sydney Roosters | 1911, 1912, 1913, 1923, 1935, 1936, 1937, 1940, 1945, 1974, 1975, 2002, 2013, 2018, 2019, 2026 |
| 15 | St. George Dragons | 1941, 1949, 1956, 1957, 1958, 1959, 1960, 1961, 1962, 1963, 1964, 1965, 1966, 1977, 1979 |
| 11 | Balmain Tigers | 1915, 1916, 1917, 1919, 1920, 1924, 1939, 1944, 1946, 1947, 1969 |
| 8 | Canterbury-Bankstown Bulldogs | 1938, 1942, 1980, 1984, 1985, 1988, 1995, 2004 |
| 8 | Manly Warringah Sea Eagles | 1972, 1973, 1976, 1978, 1987, 1996, 2008, 2011 |
| 7 | Brisbane Broncos | 1992, 1993, 1997^{SL}, 1998, 2000, 2006, 2025 |
| 6 | Penrith Panthers | 1991, 2003, 2021, 2022, 2023, 2024 |
| 4 | Western Suburbs Magpies | 1930, 1934, 1948, 1952 |
| 4 | Parramatta Eels | 1981, 1982, 1983, 1986 |
| 4 | Melbourne Storm | 1999, ~~2007~~*, ~~2009~~*, 2012, 2017, 2020 |
| 3 | Newtown Jets | 1910, 1933, 1943 |
| 3 | Canberra Raiders | 1989, 1990, 1994 |
| 2 | North Sydney Bears | 1921, 1922 |
| 2 | Newcastle Knights | 1997^{ARL}, 2001 |
| 1 | Wests Tigers | 2005 |
| 1 | St. George Illawarra Dragons | 2010 |
| 1 | North Queensland Cowboys | 2015 |
| 1 | Cronulla-Sutherland Sharks | 2016 |

- Due to salary cap breaches, Melbourne were stripped of their 2007 and 2009 premierships in 2010.

==== Most consecutive ====
- 11 – St. George (1956–66)

=== Minor premierships ===
| Tally | Club | Seasons |
|---|---|---|
| 20 | Sydney Roosters | 1912, 1913, 1923, 1931, 1934, 1935, 1936, 1937, 1940, 1941, 1945, 1974, 1975, 1980, 1981, 2004, 2013, 2014, 2015, 2018 |
| 17 | South Sydney Rabbitohs | 1908, 1909, 1914, 1918, 1925, 1926, 1927, 1929, 1932, 1949, 1950, 1951, 1953, 1968, 1969, 1970, 1989 |
| 15 | St. George Dragons | 1928, 1946, 1956, 1957, 1958, 1959, 1960, 1962, 1963, 1964, 1965, 1966, 1967, 1979, 1985 |
| 9 | Manly Warringah Sea Eagles | 1971, 1972, 1973, 1976, 1983, 1987, 1995, 1996, 1997^{ARL} |
| 7 | Balmain Tigers | 1915, 1916, 1917, 1919, 1920, 1924, 1939 |
| 7 | Canterbury-Bankstown Bulldogs | 1938, 1942, 1947, 1984, 1993, 1994, 2012 |
| 6 | Newtown Jets | 1910, 1933, 1943, 1944, 1954, 1955 |
| 6 | Melbourne Storm | ~~2006~~*, ~~2007~~*, ~~2008~~*, 2011, 2016, 2017, 2019, 2021, 2024 |
| 6 | Penrith Panthers | 1991, 2003, 2020, 2022, 2023, 2026 |
| 5 | Western Suburbs Magpies | 1930, 1948, 1952, 1961, 1978 |
| 5 | Parramatta Eels | 1977, 1982, 1986, 2001, 2005 |
| 4 | Brisbane Broncos | 1992, 1997^{SL}, 1998, 2000 |
| 2 | North Sydney Bears | 1921, 1922 |
| 2 | Cronulla-Sutherland Sharks | 1988, 1999 |
| 2 | St. George Illawarra Dragons | 2009, 2010 |
| 2 | Canberra Raiders | 1990, 2025 |
| 1 | Glebe | 1911 |
| 1 | New Zealand Warriors | 2002 |

- Due to salary cap breaches, Melbourne were stripped of their 2006, 2007, and 2008 minor premierships in 2010.

==== Most consecutive ====
- 6 – St. George (1962–67)

=== Runners-up ===
| Tally | Club | Seasons |
|---|---|---|
| 15 | Sydney Roosters | 1908, 1919, 1921, 1928, 1931, 1934, 1938, 1941, 1960, 1972, 1980, 2000, 2003, 2004, 2010 |
| 14 | South Sydney Rabbitohs | 1910, 1916, 1917, 1920, 1923, 1924, 1935, 1937, 1939, 1949, 1952, 1965, 1969, 2021 |
| 12 | St. George Dragons | 1927, 1930, 1933, 1942, 1946, 1953, 1971, 1975, 1985, 1992, 1993, 1996 |
| 11 | Manly Warringah Sea Eagles | 1951, 1957, 1959, 1968, 1970, 1982, 1983, 1995, 1997^{ARL}, 2007, 2013 |
| 10 | Canterbury-Bankstown Bulldogs | 1940, 1947, 1967, 1974, 1979, 1986, 1994, 1998, 2012, 2014 |
| 9 | Balmain Tigers | 1909, 1936, 1945, 1948, 1956, 1964, 1966, 1988, 1989 |
| 8 | Western Suburbs Magpies | 1918, 1925, 1932, 1950, 1958, 1961, 1962, 1963 |
| 7 | Newtown Jets | 1913, 1914, 1929, 1944, 1954, 1955, 1981 |
| 6 | Parramatta Eels | 1976, 1977, 1984, 2001, 2009, 2022 |
| 6 | Melbourne Storm | 2006, 2008, 2016, 2018, 2024, 2025 |
| 4 | Glebe | 1911, 1912, 1915, 1922 |
| 3 | Cronulla-Sutherland Sharks | 1973, 1978, 1997^{SL} |
| 3 | Canberra Raiders | 1987, 1991, 2019 |
| 2 | New Zealand Warriors | 2002, 2011 |
| 2 | North Queensland Cowboys | 2005, 2017 |
| 2 | Penrith Panthers | 1990, 2020 |
| 2 | Brisbane Broncos | 2015, 2023 |
| 1 | University | 1926 |
| 1 | North Sydney Bears | 1943 |
| 1 | St. George Illawarra Dragons | 1999 |
| 1 | Newcastle Knights | 2026 |

==== Most consecutive ====
- 3 – Western Suburbs Magpies (1961–63)

=== Wooden spoons ===
| Tally | Club | Seasons |
|---|---|---|
| 17 | Western Suburbs Magpies | 1909, 1910, 1912, 1913, 1916, 1933, 1940, 1942, 1953, 1955, 1971, 1983, 1984, 1987, 1988, 1998, 1999 |
| 14 | Parramatta Eels | 1947, 1952, 1954, 1956, 1957, 1958, 1959, 1960, 1961, 1970, 1972, 2012, 2013, 2018 |
| 10 | University | 1921, 1923, 1927, 1929, 1930, 1931, 1934, 1935, 1936, 1937 |
| 9 | North Sydney Bears | 1915, 1917, 1919, 1932, 1941, 1948, 1950, 1951, 1979 |
| 8 | Newtown Jets | 1924, 1925, 1928, 1939, 1968, 1976, 1977, 1978 |
| 8 | South Sydney Rabbitohs | 1945, 1946, 1962, 1975, 1990, 2003, 2004, 2006 |
| 6 | Canterbury-Bankstown Bulldogs | 1943, 1944, 1964, 2002*, 2008, 2021 |
| 5 | Sydney Roosters | 1949, 1963, 1965, 1966, 2009 |
| 5 | Newcastle Knights | 2005, 2015, 2016, 2017, 2025 |
| 4 | Balmain Tigers | 1911, 1974, 1981, 1994 |
| 4 | Penrith Panthers | 1973, 1980, 2001, 2007 |
| 3 | Annandale | 1914, 1918, 1920 |
| 3 | St. George Dragons | 1922, 1926, 1938 |
| 3 | Illawarra Steelers | 1985, 1986, 1989 |
| 3 | Gold Coast Seagulls | 1991, 1992, 1993 |
| 3 | North Queensland Cowboys | 1995, 1997^{SL}, 2000 |
| 3 | Cronulla-Sutherland Sharks | 1967, 1969, 2014 |
| 3 | Wests Tigers | 2022, 2023, 2024 |
| 2 | South Queensland Crushers | 1996, 1997^{ARL} |
| 2 | Gold Coast Titans | 2011, 2019 |
| 1 | Cumberland | 1908* |
| 1 | Canberra Raiders | 1982 |
| 1 | Melbourne Storm | 2010* |
| 1 | Brisbane Broncos | 2020 |
| 1 | St. George Illawarra Dragons | 2026 |

- The 1908 Wooden Spoon is disputed, as Cumberland finished on the same wins as Wests with a worse points differential, but did not play the first round of the competition. Cumberland are listed as the official holders of the wooden spoon by the NRL, but a commonly held view is that they received an extra bye due to missing the first round, which would place Western Suburbs last on the ladder.
- Due to salary cap breaches, Canterbury were deducted 37 competition points and relegated to the bottom of the ladder for the 2002 season. South Sydney won the fewest games that season.
- Due to salary cap breaches, Melbourne were not able to receive any points in the 2010 season, guaranteeing them the wooden spoon. North Queensland won the fewest games that season.

==== Most consecutive ====
- 6 – Parramatta Eels (1956–61)

=== Premierships ===
| Tally | Club | Seasons |
|---|---|---|
| 5 | Penrith Panthers | 2003, 2021, 2022, 2023, 2024 |
| 5 | Sydney Roosters | 2002, 2013, 2018, 2019, 2026 |
| 4 | Melbourne Storm | 1999, ~~2007~~*, ~~2009~~*, 2012, 2017, 2020 |
| 4 | Brisbane Broncos | 1998, 2000, 2006, 2025 |
| 2 | Manly Warringah Sea Eagles | 2008, 2011 |
| 1 | Newcastle Knights | 2001 |
| 1 | Canterbury-Bankstown Bulldogs | 2004 |
| 1 | Wests Tigers | 2005 |
| 1 | St. George Illawarra Dragons | 2010 |
| 1 | South Sydney Rabbitohs | 2014 |
| 1 | North Queensland Cowboys | 2015 |
| 1 | Cronulla-Sutherland Sharks | 2016 |

Due to salary cap breaches, Melbourne were stripped of their 2007 and 2009 premierships in 2010.

==== Most consecutive ====
- 4 – Penrith Panthers (2021-24)

=== Minor Premierships ===
| Tally | Club | Seasons |
|---|---|---|
| 6 | Melbourne Storm | ~~2006~~*, ~~2007~~*, ~~2008~~*, 2011, 2016, 2017, 2019, 2021, 2024 |
| 5 | Sydney Roosters | 2004, 2013, 2014, 2015, 2018 |
| 5 | Penrith Panthers | 2003, 2020, 2022, 2023, 2026 |
| 2 | Brisbane Broncos | 1998, 2000 |
| 2 | Parramatta Eels | 2001, 2005 |
| 2 | St. George Illawarra Dragons | 2009, 2010 |
| 1 | Cronulla-Sutherland Sharks | 1999 |
| 1 | New Zealand Warriors | 2002 |
| 1 | Canterbury-Bankstown Bulldogs | 2012 |
| 1 | Canberra Raiders | 2025 |

Due to salary cap breaches, Melbourne were stripped of their 2006, 2007 and 2008 minor premierships in 2010.

==== Most consecutive ====
- 3 – Sydney Roosters (2013-15)

=== Runners-up ===
| Tally | Club | Seasons |
|---|---|---|
| 6 | Melbourne Storm | 2006, 2008, 2016, 2018, 2024, 2025 |
| 4 | Sydney Roosters | 2000, 2003, 2004, 2010 |
| 3 | Canterbury-Bankstown Bulldogs | 1998, 2012, 2014 |
| 3 | Parramatta Eels | 2001, 2009, 2022 |
| 2 | New Zealand Warriors | 2002, 2011 |
| 2 | Manly Warringah Sea Eagles | 2007, 2013 |
| 2 | North Queensland Cowboys | 2005, 2017 |
| 2 | Brisbane Broncos | 2015, 2023 |
| 1 | St. George Illawarra Dragons | 1999 |
| 1 | Canberra Raiders | 2019 |
| 1 | Penrith Panthers | 2020 |
| 1 | South Sydney Rabbitohs | 2021 |
| 1 | Newcastle Knights | 2026 |

==== Most consecutive ====
- 2 – Melbourne Storm (2024-25
- 2 – Sydney Roosters (2003-04)

=== Wooden spoons ===
| Tally | Club | Seasons |
|---|---|---|
| 5 | Newcastle Knights | 2005, 2015, 2016, 2017, 2025 |
| 3 | South Sydney Rabbitohs | 2003, 2004, 2006 |
| 3 | Parramatta Eels | 2012, 2013, 2018 |
| 3 | Canterbury-Bankstown Bulldogs | 2002*, 2008, 2021 |
| 3 | Wests Tigers | 2022, 2023, 2024 |
| 2 | Western Suburbs Magpies | 1998, 1999 |
| 2 | Penrith Panthers | 2001, 2007 |
| 2 | Gold Coast Titans | 2011, 2019 |
| 1 | North Queensland Cowboys | 2000 |
| 1 | Sydney Roosters | 2009 |
| 1 | Melbourne Storm | 2010* |
| 1 | Cronulla-Sutherland Sharks | 2014 |
| 1 | Brisbane Broncos | 2020 |
| 1 | St. George Illawarra Dragons | 2026 |

Due to salary cap breaches, Canterbury were deducted 37 competition points and relegated to the bottom of the ladder for the 2002 season. South Sydney won the fewest games that season.

Due to salary cap breaches, Melbourne were not able to receive any points in the 2010 season, guaranteeing them the wooden spoon. North Queensland won the fewest games that season.

==== Most consecutive ====
- 3 – Wests Tigers (2022-24)
- 3 – Newcastle Knights (2015-17)

=== Team wins, losses, win percentage and draws ===
==== Matches played ====
All time ladder
| Pos | Team | First game | Last game | Pld | W | L | D | W% |
|---|---|---|---|---|---|---|---|---|
| 1 | Melbourne Storm | 14 March 1998 | 5 September 2026 | 760 | 503 | 251 | 6 | 66.18% |
| 2 | St. George Dragons | 23 April 1921 | 29 August 1998 | 1,545 | 910 | 579 | 56 | 58.90% |
| 3 | Brisbane Broncos | 6 March 1988 | 3 September 2026 | 978 | 573 | 391 | 14 | 58.59% |
| 4 | Manly Warringah Sea Eagles | 12 April 1947 | 5 September 2026 | 1,780 | 1,001 | 742 | 38 | 56.24% |
| 5 | Glebe | 20 April 1908 | 31 August 1929 | 297 | 163 | 128 | 6 | 54.88% |
| 6 | Sydney Roosters | 20 April 1908 | 4 October 2026 | 2,409 | 1,293 | 1,047 | 69 | 53.67% |
| 7 | South Sydney Rabbitohs | 20 April 1908 | 11 September 2026 | 2,330 | 1,209 | 1,075 | 46 | 51.89% |
| 8 | Canberra Raiders | 27 February 1982 | 5 September 2026 | 1,117 | 577 | 530 | 10 | 51.66% |
| 9 | Balmain Tigers | 20 April 1908 | 29 August 1999 | 1,705 | 871 | 766 | 68 | 51.09% |
| 10 | Dolphins | 5 March 2023 | 25 September 2026 | 98 | 50 | 48 | 0 | 51.02% |
| 11 | Canterbury-Bankstown Bulldogs | 25 April 1935 | 3 September 2026 | 2,013 | 1,013 | 947 | 53 | 50.32% |
| 12 | Cronulla-Sutherland Sharks | 2 April 1967 | 19 September 2026 | 1,450 | 719 | 707 | 24 | 49.59% |
| 13 | Penrith Panthers | 2 April 1967 | 27 September 2026 | 1,439 | 680 | 729 | 30 | 47.26% |
| 14 | St. George Illawarra Dragons | 6 March 1999 | 6 September 2026 | 697 | 327 | 364 | 6 | 46.92% |
| 15 | Newcastle Knights | 5 March 1988 | 4 October 2026 | 952 | 444 | 490 | 18 | 46.64% |
| 16 | Parramatta Eels | 12 April 1947 | 6 September 2026 | 1,832 | 844 | 948 | 40 | 46.07% |
| 17 | New Zealand Warriors | 10 March 1995 | 20 September 2026 | 781 | 359 | 413 | 9 | 45.97% |
| 18 | Newcastle | 20 April 1908 | 14 August 1909 | 20 | 9 | 11 | 0 | 45.00% |
| 19 | Newtown Jets | 20 April 1908 | 27 August 1983 | 1,305 | 583 | 663 | 59 | 44.67% |
| 20 | Western Suburbs Magpies | 20 April 1908 | 29 August 1999 | 1,691 | 734 | 908 | 49 | 43.41% |
| 21 | North Queensland Cowboys | 11 March 1995 | 12 September 2026 | 789 | 342 | 440 | 7 | 43.35% |
| 22 | North Sydney Bears | 20 April 1908 | 28 August 1999 | 1,665 | 678 | 916 | 71 | 40.72% |
| 23 | Wests Tigers | 6 February 2000 | 6 September 2026 | 657 | 261 | 393 | 3 | 39.73% |
| 24 | Northern Eagles | 6 February 2000 | 8 September 2002 | 76 | 30 | 45 | 1 | 39.47% |
| 25 | Perth Reds | 12 March 1995 | 23 August 1997 | 61 | 24 | 36 | 1 | 39.34% |
| 26 | Hunter Mariners | 2 March 1997 | 24 August 1997 | 18 | 7 | 11 | 0 | 38.89% |
| 27 | Illawarra Steelers | 28 February 1982 | 23 August 1998 | 396 | 153 | 230 | 13 | 38.64% |
| 28 | Gold Coast Titans | 18 March 2007 | 4 September 2026 | 482 | 181 | 300 | 1 | 37.55% |
| 29 | Adelaide Rams | 1 March 1997 | 22 August 1998 | 42 | 13 | 28 | 1 | 30.95% |
| 30 | Gold Coast Chargers | 5 March 1988 | 22 August 1998 | 246 | 53 | 184 | 9 | 21.54% |
| 31 | South Queensland Crushers | 11 March 1995 | 31 August 1997 | 65 | 13 | 51 | 1 | 20.00% |
| 32 | University | 8 May 1920 | 19 June 1937 | 242 | 47 | 190 | 5 | 19.42% |
| 33 | Annandale | 30 April 1910 | 1 September 1920 | 153 | 25 | 122 | 6 | 16.34% |
| 34 | Cumberland | 9 May 1908 | 25 July 1908 | 8 | 1 | 7 | 0 | 12.50% |

Source: Rugby League Tables & Statistics. Last updated: 23 May 2024

==== Most consecutive wins ====
| Rank | Wins | Team | Period |
|---|---|---|---|
| =1 | 19 matches | Eastern Suburbs Roosters | from Manly-Warringah Sea Eagles, 13 April 1975 to Newtown Jets, 23 August 1975 |
| =1 | 19 matches | Melbourne Storm | from Brisbane Broncos, 2 April 2021 to Gold Coast Titans, 19 August 2021 |
| =3 | 17 matches | Bulldogs | from St. George Illawarra Dragons, 31 March 2002 to North Queensland Cowboys, 3 August 2002 |
| =3 | 17 matches | Penrith Panthers | from Melbourne Storm, 19 June 2020 to South Sydney Rabbitohs, 17 October 2020 |
| =5 | 16 matches | South Sydney | from Newtown, 30 May 1908 to Glebe, 17 July 1909 |
| =5 | 16 matches | Eastern Suburbs | from North Sydney, 15 June 1912 to Glebe, 28 June 1913 |
| =7 | 15 matches | South Sydney | from Balmain, 2 May 1925 to North Sydney, 8 May 1926 |
| =7 | 15 matches | Manly Warringah Sea Eagles | from South Sydney Rabbitohs, 12 March 1995 to Parramatta Eels, 9 July 1995 |
| =7 | 15 matches | Melbourne Storm | from Penrith Panthers, 4 August 2012 to New Zealand Warriors, 25 April 2013 |
| =7 | 15 matches | Cronulla-Sutherland Sharks | from Melbourne Storm, 28 March 2016 to Newcastle Knights, 24 July 2016 |
Source: Rugby League Tables & Statistics. Last updated: 19 August 2021.

==== Most consecutive losses ====
| Rank | Losses | Team | Period |
|---|---|---|---|
| 1 | 42 matches | University | from Balmain, 28 April 1934 to Eastern Suburbs, 22 August 1936 |
| 2 | 25 matches | Eastern Suburbs | from North Sydney, 25 July 1965 to Canterbury-Bankstown, 9 April 1967 |
| =3 | 22 matches | South Sydney | from St. George, 23 June 1945 to St. George, 12 April 1947 |
| =3 | 22 matches | Western Suburbs Magpies | from Eastern Suburbs Roosters, 25 April 1984 to St. George Dragons, 14 April 1985 |
| 5 | 20 matches | Newtown Jets | from Penrith Panthers, 27 March 1977 to Manly-Warringah Sea Eagles, 14 August 1977 |
| =6 | 19 matches | Parramatta | from North Sydney, 24 May 1959 to St. George, 13 June 1960 |
| =6 | 19 matches | Newcastle Knights | from Brisbane Broncos, 16 April 2016 to New Zealand Warriors, 5 March 2017 |
| =8 | 16 matches | Annandale | from Eastern Suburbs, 28 July 1917 to Glebe, 10 May 1919 |
| =8 | 16 matches | Eastern Suburbs | from South Sydney, 21 June 1964 to South Sydney, 5 June 1965 |
| =8 | 16 matches | Gold Coast Seagulls | from Eastern Suburbs Roosters, 25 April 1993 to Eastern Suburbs Roosters, 28 August 1993 |
Source: Rugby League Tables & Statistics. Last updated: 5 March 2017.

=== Result records ===
==== Greatest winning margin ====
| Rank | Margin | Winning team | Defeated team | Score | Venue | Date |
|---|---|---|---|---|---|---|
| 1 | 85 | St. George | Canterbury-Bankstown | 91–6 | Earl Park | 11 May 1935 |
| 2 | 80 | Eastern Suburbs | Canterbury-Bankstown | 87–7 | Sydney Sports Ground | 18 May 1935 |
| 3 | 74 | North Queensland Cowboys | Wests Tigers | 74–0 | Queensland Country Bank Stadium | 1 July 2023 |
| =4 | 70 | Parramatta Eels | Cronulla-Sutherland Sharks | 74–4 | Parramatta Stadium | 23 August 2003 |
| =4 | 70 | Sydney Roosters | North Queensland Cowboys | 82–12 | Queensland Country Bank Stadium | 30 July 2026 |
Source: Rugby League Tables & Statistics. Last updated: 30 June 2026.

===== Greatest winning margin in a grand final =====
| Rank | Margin | Winning team | Defeated team | Score | Venue | Date |
|---|---|---|---|---|---|---|
| 1 | 40 | Manly Warringah Sea Eagles | Melbourne Storm | 40–0 | ANZ Stadium | 5 October 2008 |
| 2 | 38 | Eastern Suburbs Roosters | St George Dragons | 38–0 | Sydney Cricket Ground | 20 September 1975 |
| 3 | 32 | North Sydney | Glebe | 35–3 | Sydney Cricket Ground | 6 September 1922 |
| 4 | 29 | Balmain | South Sydney | 33–4 | Sydney Cricket Ground | 2 September 1939 |
| =5 | 28 | South Sydney | Manly Warringah | 42–14 | Sydney Sports Ground | 23 September 1951 |
| =5 | 28 | Melbourne Storm | North Queensland Cowboys | 34–6 | ANZ Stadium | 1 October 2017 |
Source: Rugby League Tables & Statistics. Last updated: 31 October 2024.

Greatest win to nil

| Rank | Score | Winning team | Defeated team | Venue | Date |
|---|---|---|---|---|---|
| 1 | 74–0 | North Queensland Cowboys | Wests Tigers | Queensland Country Bank Stadium | 1 July 2023 |
| =2 | 68–0 | Canberra Raiders | Parramatta Eels | Bruce Stadium | 22 August 1993 |
| =2 | 68–0 | Penrith Panthers | Wests Tigers | Commbank Stadium | 7 June 2026 |
| 4 | 67–0 | South Sydney | Western Suburbs | RAS Showground | 23 July 1910 |
| =5 | 66–0 | New Zealand Warriors | South Sydney Rabbitohs | Telstra Stadium | 25 June 2006 |
| =5 | 66–0 | Manly Warringah Sea Eagles | Canterbury-Bankstown Bulldogs | Bankwest Stadium | 3 July 2021 |
| =5 | 66–0 | Newcastle Knights | Canterbury-Bankstown Bulldogs | Accor Stadium | 2 July 2023 |
| =5 | 66–0 | Cronulla-Sutherland Sharks | Dolphins | Kayo Stadium | 11 July 2026 |

=== Most points scored in a game ===
| Rank | Points | Winning team | Defeated team | Score | Venue | Date |
|---|---|---|---|---|---|---|
| 1 | 102 | Newcastle Knights | Canberra Raiders | 70–32 | Canberra Stadium | 19 March 2006 |
| 2 | 97 | St. George | Canterbury-Bankstown | 91–6 | Earl Park | 11 May 1935 |
| 3 | 96 | Penrith Panthers | Northern Eagles | 68–28 | Brookvale Oval | 8 September 2002 |
| =4 | 94 | Eastern Suburbs | Canterbury-Bankstown | 87–7 | Sydney Sports Ground | 18 May 1935 |
| =4 | 94 | Sydney Roosters | North Queensland Cowboys | 64–30 | Aussie Stadium | 9 June 2007 |
| =4 | 94 | Sydney Roosters | North Queensland Cowboys | 82–12 | Queensland Country Bank Stadium | 30 July 2026 |
Source: Rugby League Tables & Statistics. Last updated: 30 July 2026.

==== Most points scored in a grand final ====
| Rank | Points | Winning team | Defeated team | Score | Venue | Date |
|---|---|---|---|---|---|---|
| 1 | 56 | South Sydney | Manly Warringah | 42–14 | Sydney Sports Ground | 23 September 1951 |
| 2 | 54 | Newcastle Knights | Parramatta Eels | 30–24 | Stadium Australia | 30 September 2001 |
| =3 | 50 | Brisbane Broncos | Canterbury-Bankstown Bulldogs | 38–12 | Sydney Football Stadium | 27 September 1998 |
| =3 | 50 | Penrith Panthers | Brisbane Broncos | 26–24 | Accor Stadium | 1 October 2023 |
| =5 | 48 | Canberra Raiders | Canterbury-Bankstown Bulldogs | 36–12 | Sydney Football Stadium | 25 September 1994 |
| =5 | 48 | Brisbane Broncos | Melbourne Storm | 26–22 | Accor Stadium | 5 October 2025 |
Source: Rugby League Tables & Statistics. Last updated: 31 October 2024.

==== Fewest points scored in a game ====
| Rank | Points | Winning team | Defeated team | Score | Venue | Date |
|---|---|---|---|---|---|---|
| 1 | 0 | Newtown Jets drew with Canterbury-Bankstown Bulldogs | – | 0–0 | Henson Park | 28 March 1982 |
| 2 | 1 | Newtown Jets | St. George Dragons | 1–0 | Sydney Cricket Ground | 12 May 1973 |
| =3 | 2 | Newtown | Eastern Suburbs | 2–0 | Sydney Cricket Ground | 16 May 1914 |
| =3 | 2 | Balmain | North Sydney | 2–0 | North Sydney Oval | 25 April 1931 |
| =3 | 2 | South Sydney | Parramatta | 2–0 | Sydney Sports Ground | 18 July 1965 |
Source: Rugby League Tables & Statistics. Last updated: 8 February 2007.

===== Fewest points scored in a grand final =====
| Rank | Points | Winning team | Defeated team | Score | Venue | Date |
|---|---|---|---|---|---|---|
| 1 | 3 | Balmain | South Sydney | 3–0 | Sydney Cricket Ground | 29 July 1924 |
| 2 | 6 | Parramatta Eels | Canterbury-Bankstown Bulldogs | 4–2 | Sydney Cricket Ground | 28 September 1986 |
| =3 | 8 | Newtown | South Sydney | 4–4 | Sydney Showground | 17 September 1910 |
| =3 | 8 | Balmain | South Sydney | 5–3 | Sydney Cricket Ground | July 26, 1916 |
| 5 | 10 | Canterbury-Bankstown Bulldogs | Parramatta Eels | 6–4 | Sydney Cricket Ground | 16 September 1984 |
Source: Rugby League Tables & Statistics. Last updated: 31 October 2024.

==== Most points scored by one team in a game ====
| Rank | Points | Winning team | Defeated team | Score | Venue | Date |
|---|---|---|---|---|---|---|
| 1 | 91 | St. George | Canterbury-Bankstown | 91–6 | Earl Park | 11 May 1935 |
| 2 | 87 | Eastern Suburbs | Canterbury-Bankstown | 87–7 | Sydney Sports Ground | 18 May 1935 |
| 3 | 82 | Sydney Roosters | North Queensland Cowboys | 82–12 | Queensland Country Bank Stadium | 30 July 2026 |
| =4 | 74 | Parramatta Eels | Cronulla-Sutherland Sharks | 74–4 | Parramatta Stadium | 23 August 2003 |
| =4 | 74 | Canberra Raiders | Penrith Panthers | 74–12 | Canberra Stadium | 10 August 2008 |
| =4 | 74 | North Queensland Cowboys | Wests Tigers | 74–0 | Queensland Country Bank Stadium | 1 July 2023 |
Source: Rugby League Tables & Statistics. Last updated: 1 July 2023.

===== Most points scored by one team in a grand final =====
| Rank | Points | Winning team | Defeated team | Score | Venue | Date |
|---|---|---|---|---|---|---|
| 1 | 42 | South Sydney | Manly Warringah | 42–14 | Sydney Sports Ground | 23 September 1951 |
| 2 | 40 | Manly Warringah Sea Eagles | Melbourne Storm | 40–0 | ANZ Stadium | 5 October 2008 |
| =3 | 38 | Eastern Suburbs Roosters | St George Dragons | 38–0 | Sydney Cricket Ground | 20 September 1975 |
| =3 | 38 | Brisbane Broncos | Canterbury-Bankstown Bulldogs | 38–12 | Sydney Football Stadium | 27 September 1998 |
| 5 | 36 | Canberra Raiders | Canterbury-Bankstown Bulldogs | 36–12 | Sydney Football Stadium | 25 September 1994 |
Source: Rugby League Tables & Statistics. Last updated: 31 October 2024.

==== Highest scores by a losing side ====
| Points | Winning team | Defeated team | Score | Venue | Date |
|---|---|---|---|---|---|
| 40 | Parramatta Eels | St. George Illawarra Dragons | 44–40 | CommBank Stadium | 31 August 2024 |
| 38 | Newcastle Knights | South Sydney Rabbitohs | 42–38 | McDonald Jones Stadium | 3 May 2026 |
| 36 | Canterbury Bulldogs | Hunter Mariners | 48–36 | Belmore Sports Ground | 12 May 1997 |
| 36 | Wests Tigers | Bulldogs | 37–36 | Telstra Stadium | 27 March 2005 |
| 36 | Gold Coast Titans | Newcastle Knights | 38–36 | Energy Australia Stadium | 9 May 2010 |
| 36 | Gold Coast Titans | Melbourne Storm | 38–36 | Suncorp Stadium | 13 May 2017 |

===== Highest scores by a losing side in a grand final =====
| Rank | Points | Team | Opponent | Score | Venue | Date |
|---|---|---|---|---|---|---|
| =1 | 24 | Parramatta Eels | Newcastle Knights | 30–24 | Stadium Australia | 30 September 2001 |
| =1 | 24 | Brisbane Broncos | Penrith Panthers | 26–24 | Accor Stadium | 1 October 2023 |
| 3 | 22 | Melbourne Storm | Brisbane Broncos | 26–22 | Accor Stadium | 5 October 2025 |
| 4 | 20 | Penrith Panthers | Melbourne Storm | 26–20 | ANZ Stadium | 25 October 2020 |
| =5 | 18 | St George Illawarra Dragons | Melbourne Storm | 20–18 | Stadium Australia | 26 September 1999 |
| =5 | 18 | Manly Warringah Sea Eagles | Sydney Roosters | 26–18 | ANZ Stadium | 6 October 2013 |
| =5 | 18 | Newcastle Knights | Sydney Roosters | 19–18 | Accor Stadium | 4 October 2026 |
Source: Rugby League Tables & Statistics. Last updated: 31 October 2024.

==== Highest drawn games scores ====
| Score | Teams | Venue | Date |
|---|---|---|---|
| 34–34 | Parramatta vs. North Sydney | Cumberland Oval | 25 June 1949 |
| 34–34 | Illawarra Steelers vs. Manly Warringah Sea Eagles | WIN Stadium | 4 May 1997 |
| 34–34 | South Sydney Rabbitohs vs. Brisbane Broncos | Aussie Stadium | 28 August 2004 |
| 32–32 | Penrith Panthers vs. New Zealand Warriors | CUA Stadium | 1 August 2009 |
| 32–32 | Manly Warringah Sea Eagles vs. Newcastle Knights | Glen Willow Oval | 1 April 2023 |

=== Best start to a season ===
| Wins | Team | Season |
|---|---|---|
| 15 | Manly Warringah Sea Eagles | 1995 ARL season |
| 12 | South Sydney | 1925 NSWRFL season |
| 12 | Penrith Panthers | 2021 NRL season |
| 11 | Western Suburbs Magpies | 1934 NSWRFL season |
| 11 | Balmain | 1966 NSWRFL season |
| 10 | St. George | 1959 NSWRFL season |
| 10 | Sydney City Roosters | 1996 ARL season |

=== Undefeated in a season ===
| Year | Team |
|---|---|
| 1915 | Balmain |
| 1921 | North Sydney |
| 1925 | South Sydney† |
| 1936 | Eastern Suburbs |
| 1937 | Eastern Suburbs |
| 1959 | St. George |

† – Won every game

=== Failed to win a match in a season ===
| Year | Team |
|---|---|
| 1935 | University |
| 1946 | South Sydney |
| 1966 | Eastern Suburbs |

=== Most points scored by a team in a season ===
- 943 points by the Parramatta Eels in 2001

=== Fewest points scored by a team in a season ===
- 38 points by Cumberland in 1908

=== Most points conceded by a team in a season ===
- 944 points by the Western Suburbs Magpies in 1999

=== Fewest points conceded by a team in a season ===
- 41 points by South Sydney in 1909

=== Keeping opposition scoreless: most games in a season ===
- 6 matches by the Sydney Roosters in 2013

=== Biggest comebacks ===
| Points | Biggest comebacks |
|---|---|
| 26 points | North Queensland Cowboys came from 0–26 down at halftime to win 36–28 against the Penrith Panthers on 29 May 1998 at Penrith Stadium. Dolphins came from 0–26 down after 33 minutes to win 28–26 against the Gold Coast Titans on 23 April 2023 at Suncorp Stadium. Penrith Panthers came from 6–32 down after 53 minutes to draw 32–32 against the New Zealand Warriors on 1 August 2009 at CUA Stadium. |
| 24 points | Wests Tigers came from 0–24 down after 26 minutes to win 36–32 against the Newcastle Knights on 11 August 2001 at Campbelltown Stadium. St. George Illawarra Dragons came from 10–34 down after 56 minutes to win 36–34 against the Manly Warringah Sea Eagles on 29 August 2004 at OKI Jubilee Stadium. South Sydney Rabbitohs came from 4–28 down after 52 minutes to win 29–28 against the North Queensland Cowboys on 28 June 2008 at Dairy Farmers Stadium. Cronulla-Sutherland Sharks came from 0–24 down after 37 minutes to win 30–28 against the Sydney Roosters on 5 July 2014 at Allianz Stadium. North Queensland Cowboys came from 6–30 down after 57 minutes to win 36–30 against the Parramatta Eels on 8 June 2015 at Pirtek Stadium. Dolphins came from 0–24 down after 24 minutes to win 40–32 against the Brisbane Broncos on 8 August 2026 at Suncorp Stadium. |
| 23 points | Penrith Panthers came from 8–31 down after 57 minutes to win 32–31 against the Wests Tigers on 4 June 2000 at Penrith Stadium. |
| 22 points | Parramatta Eels came from 0–22 down at halftime to win 30–22 against the Canberra Raiders on 26 April 1987 at Parramatta Stadium. Melbourne Storm came from 0–22 down after 20 minutes to win 36–32 against the Cronulla-Sutherland Sharks on 16 March 2003 at Toyota Stadium. Parramatta Eels came from 0–22 down at halftime to win 34–28 against the Penrith Panthers on 17 July 2010 at CUA Stadium. North Queensland Cowboys came from 0–22 down after 30 minutes to win 40–24 against the Canberra Raiders on 5 June 2011 at GIO Stadium Canberra. Cronulla-Sutherland Sharks came from 0–22 down after 53 minutes to win 24–22 against the Brisbane Broncos on 28 June 2014 at Suncorp Stadium. Canberra Raiders came from 0–22 down after 28 minutes to win 30–22 against the Wests Tigers on 19 April 2015 at Leichhardt Oval. Canberra Raiders came from 0–22 down after 39 minutes to win 29–25 against the Newcastle Knights on 3 July 2016 at GIO Stadium Canberra. Penrith Panthers came from 6–28 down after 46 minutes to win 36–28 against the New Zealand Warriors on 13 May 2017 at Pepper Stadium. Brisbane Broncos came from 0–22 down after 18 minutes to win 36–28 against the Gold Coast Titans on 30 April 2021 at Suncorp Stadium. Canberra Raiders came from 0–22 down after 39 minutes to win 24–22 against Gold Coast Titans on 26 March 2022 at GIO Stadium Canberra. |
| 21 points | North Sydney Bears came from 2–23 down after 28 minutes to defeat St. George Dragons 26–23 on 19 July 1987 at North Sydney Oval. New Zealand Warriors came from 10–31 down after 51 minutes to win 34–31 against the Canberra Raiders on 27 March 2021 at GIO Stadium Canberra. |
| 20 points | New Zealand Warriors came from 0–20 down after 39 minutes to win 30–26 against the Newcastle Knights on 17 April 2005 at EnergyAustralia Stadium. Manly Warringah Sea Eagles came from 6–26 down after 50 minutes to win 36–26 against the Penrith Panthers on 29 May 2005 at Brookvale Oval. Brisbane Broncos came from 4–24 down after 52 minutes to win 35–24 against the Gold Coast Titans on 27 May 2022 at Suncorp Stadium. New Zealand Warriors came from 6–26 down after 29 minutes to win 32–30 against the Cronulla-Sutherland Sharks on 2 April 2023 at PointsBet Stadium. Canberra Raiders came from 0–20 down after 31 minutes to win 26–24 against the Manly Warringah Sea Eagles on 3 May 2024 at 4 Pines Park. Gold Coast Titans came from 20–0 down after 34 minutes to win 24–20 against the Newcastle Knights on 9 May 2025 at McDonald Jones Stadium. Canterbury-Bankstown Bulldogs came from 20–0 down after 44 minutes to win 32–20 against the Canberra Raiders on 10 May 2025 at GIO Stadium Canberra. |

==== In a grand final ====
- 16 points: Penrith Panthers came from 8–24 down after 62 minutes to defeat Brisbane Broncos 26–24 in 2023.

== Individual records ==
Note: Figures in bold are currently playing in the NRL.

=== Most games played ===
| Rank | Games | Player | Clubs | Years |
|---|---|---|---|---|
| 1 | 430 | Cameron Smith | Melbourne Storm | 2002–2020 |
| 2 | 379 | Daly Cherry-Evans | Manly Warringah Sea Eagles, Sydney Roosters | 2011–2026 |
| 3 | 373 | **Ben Hunt** | **Brisbane Broncos**, St. George Illawarra Dragons | 2009– |
| 4 | 372 | Cooper Cronk | Melbourne Storm, Sydney Roosters | 2004–2019 |
| 5 | 355 | Darren Lockyer | Brisbane Broncos | 1995–2011 |
| 6 | 350 | Terry Lamb | Western Suburbs Magpies, Canterbury Bulldogs | 1980–1996 |
| 7 | 349 | Steve Menzies | Manly Warringah Sea Eagles, Northern Eagles | 1993–2008 |
| 8 | 348 | Paul Gallen | Cronulla-Sutherland Sharks | 2001–2019 |
| 9 | 347 | Corey Parker | Brisbane Broncos | 2001–2016 |
| 10 | 346 | Benji Marshall | Wests Tigers, St. George Illawarra Dragons, Brisbane Broncos, South Sydney Rabbitohs | 2003–2021 |

==== At one club ====
| Games | Player | Club | Years |
|---|---|---|---|
| 430 | Cameron Smith | Melbourne Storm | 2002–2020 |
| 355 | Darren Lockyer | Brisbane Broncos | 1995–2011 |
| 352 | Daly Cherry-Evans | Manly Warringah Sea Eagles | 2011–2025 |
| 348 | Paul Gallen | Cronulla-Sutherland Sharks | 2001–2019 |
| 347 | Corey Parker | Brisbane Broncos | 2001–2016 |
| 342 | Josh Papali'i | Canberra Raiders | 2011–2026 |
| 336 | John Sutton | South Sydney Rabbitohs | 2004–2019 |
| 330 | Nathan Hindmarsh | Parramatta Eels | 1998–2012 |
| 328 | Andrew Ettingshausen | Cronulla-Sutherland Sharks | 1983–2000 |
| 323 | Cooper Cronk | Melbourne Storm | 2004–2017 |
| 319 | Billy Slater | Melbourne Storm | 2003–2018 |
| 318 | Jason Croker | Canberra Raiders | 1991–2006 |
| 317 | Hazem El Masri | Bulldogs | 1996–2009 |
| 310 | Jared Waerea-Hargreaves | Sydney Roosters | 2010–2024 |
| 309 | Cliff Lyons | Manly Warringah Sea Eagles | 1986–1999 |
| 309 | **Jason Taumalolo** | North Queensland Cowboys | 2010– |
| 307 | Jarrod Croker | Canberra Raiders | 2009–2023 |
| 307 | Daniel Tupou | Sydney Roosters | 2012–2026 |
| 306 | Mitchell Aubusson | Sydney Roosters | 2007–2020 |
| 304 | Sam Thaiday | Brisbane Broncos | 2003–2018 |
| 302 | Anthony Minichiello | Sydney Roosters | 2000–2014 |
| 301 | Luke Ricketson | Sydney Roosters | 1991–2005 |
| 301 | Simon Mannering | New Zealand Warriors | 2005–2018 |
Source: Eels NRL Player Stats. Retrieved 3 February 2012.

==== Per club ====
| Club | Games | Player |
|---|---|---|
| Brisbane Broncos | 355 | Darren Lockyer |
| Canberra Raiders | 342 | Josh Papali'i |
| Canterbury-Bankstown Bulldogs | 317 | Hazem El Masri |
| Cronulla-Sutherland Sharks | 348 | Paul Gallen |
| Dolphins | 98 | Jamayne Isaako |
| Gold Coast Titans | 187 | **Moeaki Fotuaika** |
| Manly Warringah Sea Eagles | 352 | Daly Cherry-Evans |
| Melbourne Storm | 430 | Cameron Smith |
| Newcastle Knights | 257 | Danny Buderus |
| New Zealand Warriors | 301 | Simon Mannering |
| North Queensland Cowboys | 309 | **Jason Taumalolo** |
| Parramatta Eels | 330 | Nathan Hindmarsh |
| Penrith Panthers | 286 | **Isaah Yeo** |
| South Sydney Rabbitohs | 336 | John Sutton |
| St. George Illawarra Dragons | 273 | Ben Hornby |
| Sydney Roosters | 310 | Jared Waerea-Hargreaves |
| Wests Tigers | 277 | Robbie Farah |

=== Most tries scored ===
==== In a career ====
| Rank | Tries | Player | Clubs | Years |
|---|---|---|---|---|
| 1 | 240 | **Alex Johnston** | South Sydney Rabbitohs | 2014– |
| 2 | 212 | Ken Irvine | North Sydney, Manly Warringah | 1958–1973 |
| 3 | 198 | Daniel Tupou | Sydney Roosters | 2012–2026 |
| 4 | 190 | Billy Slater | Melbourne Storm | 2003–2018 |
| 5 | 180 | Steve Menzies | Manly Warringah Sea Eagles, Northern Eagles | 1993–2008 |
| 6 | 176 | Brett Morris | St. George Illawarra Dragons, Canterbury-Bankstown Bulldogs, Sydney Roosters | 2006–2021 |
| 7 | 167 | **Josh Addo-Carr** | Wests Tigers, Melbourne Storm, Canterbury-Bankstown Bulldogs, **Parramatta Eels** | 2016– |
| 8 | 166 | Andrew Ettingshausen | Cronulla-Sutherland Sharks | 1983–2000 |
| 9 | 164 | Terry Lamb | Western Suburbs Magpies, Canterbury Bulldogs | 1980–1996 |
| 10 | 163 | Brett Stewart | Manly Warringah Sea Eagles | 2003–2016 |
Source: Rugby League Tables. Last updated: 25 September 2026.

==== In a season ====
| Tries | Player | Club | Season |
|---|---|---|---|
| 38 | Dave Brown | Eastern Suburbs | 1935 |
| 34 | Ray Preston | Newtown | 1954 |
| 30 | **Alex Johnston** | South Sydney Rabbitohs | 2021 |
| 30 | **Alex Johnston** | South Sydney Rabbitohs | 2022 |
| 30 | **Alex Johnston** | South Sydney Rabbitohs | 2026 |
| 30 | **Thomas Jenkins** | Penrith Panthers | 2026 |
| 29 | Les Brennan | South Sydney | 1954 |
| 28 | Bob Lulham | Balmain | 1947 |
| 28 | Johnny Graves | South Sydney | 1951 |
| 28 | **Tom Trbojevic** | Manly Warringah Sea Eagles | 2021 |

==== In a game ====
- 8 – Frank Burge, Glebe vs. University, Round 7, 1920

==== Per club ====
| Club | Tries | Player |
|---|---|---|
| Brisbane Broncos | 142 | Steve Renouf |
| Canberra Raiders | 136 | Jarrod Croker |
| Canterbury-Bankstown Bulldogs | 159 | Hazem El Masri |
| Cronulla-Sutherland Sharks | 166 | Andrew Ettingshausen |
| Dolphins | 70 | Jamayne Isaako |
| Gold Coast Titans | 86 | Phillip Sami |
| Manly Warringah Sea Eagles | 163 | Brett Stewart |
| Melbourne Storm | 190 | Billy Slater |
| Newcastle Knights | 110 | Akuila Uate |
| New Zealand Warriors | 152 | Manu Vatuvei |
| North Queensland Cowboys | 151 | Kyle Feldt |
| Parramatta Eels | 124 | Luke Burt |
| Penrith Panthers | 113 | Rhys Wesser |
| South Sydney Rabbitohs | 240 | **Alex Johnston** |
| St. George Illawarra Dragons | 124 | Matt Cooper |
| Sydney Roosters | 198 | Daniel Tupou |
| Wests Tigers | 100 | David Nofoaluma |

=== Most points scored ===
==== In a career ====
| Rank | Points | Player | Clubs | Period |
|---|---|---|---|---|
| 1 | 2,786 | Cameron Smith | Melbourne Storm | 430 games (2002–2020) |
| 2 | 2,598 | Adam Reynolds | South Sydney Rabbitohs, Brisbane Broncos | 323 games (2012–2026) |
| 3 | 2,418 | Hazem El Masri | Canterbury-Bankstown Bulldogs | 317 games (1996–2009) |
| 4 | 2,374 | Jarrod Croker | Canberra Raiders | 307 games (2009–2023) |
| 5 | 2,222 | Johnathan Thurston | Bulldogs, North Queensland Cowboys | 323 games (2002–2018) |
| 6 | 2,176 | Andrew Johns | Newcastle Knights | 249 games (1993–2007) |
| 7 | 2,107 | Jason Taylor | Western Suburbs Magpies, North Sydney Bears, Northern Eagles, Parramatta Eels | 276 games (1990–2001) |
| 8 | 2,034 | Daryl Halligan | North Sydney Bears, Bulldogs | 230 games (1991–2000) |
| 9 | 1,971 | Mick Cronin | Parramatta Eels | 216 games (1977–1986) |
| 10 | 1,941 | **Nathan Cleary** | Penrith Panthers | 216 games (2016–) |
Source: Rugby League Tables & Statistics. Last updated: 13 September 2026.

==== In a season ====
| Points | Player | Club | Year |
|---|---|---|---|
| 342 (16t, 139g) | Hazem El Masri | Canterbury-Bankstown Bulldogs | 2004 |
| 334 (23t, 121g) | **Reuben Garrick** | Manly Warringah Sea Eagles | 2021 |
| 310 (23t, 109g) | **Jamayne Isaako** | Dolphins | 2026 |
| 308 (15t, 124g) | Brett Hodgson | Wests Tigers | 2005 |
| 296 (18t, 112g) | Hazem El Masri | Canterbury-Bankstown Bulldogs | 2006 |
| 296 (16t, 129g) | Jarrod Croker | Canberra Raiders | 2016 |

==== In a game ====
| Rank | Points | Player | Club | Opposition | Date |
|---|---|---|---|---|---|
| 1 | 45 (5t, 15g) | Dave Brown | Eastern Suburbs | Canterbury-Bankstown | 18 May 1935 |
| =2 | 38 (6t, 10g) | Dave Brown | Eastern Suburbs | Canterbury-Bankstown | 10 August 1935 |
| =2 | 38 (5t, 9g) | Mal Meninga | Canberra Raiders | Eastern Suburbs | 15 April 1990 |
| =4 | 36 (2t, 15g) | Les Griffin | St. George | Canterbury-Bankstown | 11 May 1935 |
| =4 | 36 (6t, 9g) | Jack Lindwall | St. George | Manly Warringah Sea Eagles | 3 May 1947 |
| =4 | 36 (4t, 10g) | Terry Campese | Canberra Raiders | Penrith Panthers | 10 August 2008 |
| =4 | 36 (4t, 10g) | Ryan Papenhuyzen | Melbourne Storm | Wests Tigers | 11 May 2025 |
| =4 | 36 (3t, 12g) | **Sam Walker** | Sydney Roosters | North Queensland Cowboys | 30 July 2026 |

==== Per club ====
| Club | Points | Player |
|---|---|---|
| Brisbane Broncos | 1,328 | Corey Parker |
| Canberra Raiders | 2,374 | Jarrod Croker |
| Canterbury-Bankstown Bulldogs | 2,418 | Hazem El Masri |
| Cronulla-Sutherland Sharks | 1,255 | Steve Rogers |
| Dolphins | 1,055 | Jamayne Isaako |
| Gold Coast Titans | 719 | Scott Prince |
| Manly Warringah Sea Eagles | 1,917 | Graham Eadie |
| Melbourne Storm | 2,786 | Cameron Smith |
| Newcastle Knights | 2,176 | Andrew Johns |
| New Zealand Warriors | 1,476 | Shaun Johnson |
| North Queensland Cowboys | 2,182 | Johnathan Thurston |
| Parramatta Eels | 1,971 | Mick Cronin |
| Penrith Panthers | 1,941 | **Nathan Cleary** |
| South Sydney Rabbitohs | 1,896 | Adam Reynolds |
| St. George Illawarra Dragons | 977 | Jamie Soward |
| Sydney Roosters | 1,469 | Craig Fitzgibbon |
| Wests Tigers | 1,181 | Benji Marshall |

=== Oldest players ===
| Age | Player | Club | Year |
|---|---|---|---|
| 40 years, 5 days | Billy Wilson | North Sydney | 1967 |
| 39 years, 311 days | Tedda Courtney | Western Suburbs | 1924 |
| 38 years, 263 days | George Green | North Sydney | 1922 |
| 38 years, 134 days | Roy Kirkaldy | Canterbury-Bankstown | 1948 |
| 38 years, 31 days | Paul Gallen | Cronulla-Sutherland Sharks | 2019 |
| 38 years, 28 days | Henry Porter | Canterbury-Bankstown | 1948 |
| 38 years, 25 days | Sandy Pearce | Eastern Suburbs | 1921 |
| 37 years, 363 days | Robert Craig | Balmain | 1919 |
| 37 years, 313 days | Cliff Lyons | Manly Warringah Sea Eagles | 1999 |
| 37 years, 226 days | Daly Cherry-Evans | Sydney Roosters | 2026 |

=== Oldest premiership winners ===
| Age | Player | Club | Year |
|---|---|---|---|
| 38 years, 263 days | George Green | North Sydney | 1922 |
| 37 years, 226 days | Daly Cherry-Evans | Sydney Roosters | 2026 |
| 37 years, 129 days | Cameron Smith | Melbourne Storm | 2020 |
| 36 years, 123 days | Ken Kearney | St. George | 1960 |
| 36 years, 70 days | John Ferguson | Canberra Raiders | 1990 |
| 36 years, 12 days | Lote Tuqiri | South Sydney Rabbitohs | 2014 |
| 35 years, 330 days | Robert Craig | Balmain | 1917 |
| 35 years, 305 days | Cooper Cronk | Sydney Roosters | 2019 |
| 35 years, 226 days | Des Hasler | Manly Warringah Sea Eagles | 1996 |
| 35 years, 192 days | **Ben Hunt** | Brisbane Broncos | 2025 |

=== Oldest players on debut (since 1998) ===
| Age | Player | Club | Year |
|---|---|---|---|
| 29 years, 231 days | Brian Carney (Note: Brian Carney and Rémi Casty are often excluded or caveated on the list of oldest debutants in the NRL era, as both players had distinguished careers in the Super League prior to debuting in the NRL.) | Newcastle Knights | 2006 |
| 29 years, 107 days | Rémi Casty | Sydney Roosters | 2014 |
| 29 years, 92 days | Jonathon Reuben | St. George Illawarra Dragons | 2022 |
| 29 years, 81 days | Darren Nicholls | St. George Illawarra Dragons | 2018 |
| 29 years, 43 days | Jayden Berrell | Cronulla-Sutherland Sharks | 2024 |

=== Youngest players ===
| Age | Player | Club | Year |
|---|---|---|---|
| 16 years, 86 days | Ray Stehr | Eastern Suburbs | 1929 |
| 16 years, 208 days | Jack Arnold | Western Suburbs | 1936 |
| 16 years, 238 days | Jordan Rankin | Gold Coast Titans | 2008 |
| 16 years, 258 days | Frank Burge | Glebe | 1911 |
| 16 years, 292 days | Charlie Montgomery | St. George | 1941 |
| 16 years, 299 days | Andrew Dunemann | Gold Coast Seagulls | 1993 |
| 16 years, 303 days | Adam Ritson | Cronulla-Sutherland Sharks | 1993 |
| 16 years, 313 days | Paul Mellor | South Sydney Rabbitohs | 1991 |
| 17 years, 2 days | Arthur Beed | Newtown | 1912 |
| 17 years, 32 days | Nathan Barnes | Penrith Panthers | 1992 |

=== Youngest premiership winners ===
| Age | Player | Club | Year |
|---|---|---|---|
| 17 years, 60 days | Charlie Montgomery | St. George | 1941 |
| 18 years, 63 days | Johnny King | St. George | 1960 |
| 18 years, 136 days | Greg Hawick | South Sydney | 1950 |
| 18 years, 206 days | Vince Sheehan | Western Suburbs | 1934 |
| 18 years, 227 days | Bruce Pollard | St. George | 1963 |
| 18 years, 296 days | Graham Eadie | Manly-Warringah | 1972 |
| 18 years, 336 days | Frank Stanmore | Western Suburbs | 1948 |
| 19 years, 29 days | Ian Schubert | Eastern Suburbs Roosters | 1975 |
| 19 years, 61 days | Sonny Bill Williams | Canterbury-Bankstown Bulldogs | 2004 |
| 19 years, 76 days | Darius Boyd | Brisbane Broncos | 2006 |

=== Most games coached ===
| Rank | Games | Coach | Clubs | Years |
|---|---|---|---|---|
| 1 | 987 (Note: Includes 2 games in 2020 considered to have been "coached remotely," despite not being physically present due to the NRL's COVID-19 protocols, and 1 in 2024.) | **Wayne Bennett** | Canberra Raiders, Brisbane Broncos, St. George Illawarra Dragons, Newcastle Knights, **South Sydney Rabbitohs**, Dolphins | 1987–2021, 2023– |
| 2 | 693 | Tim Sheens | Penrith Panthers, Canberra Raiders, North Queensland Cowboys, Wests Tigers | 1984–2001, 2003–2012, 2023 |
| 3 | 630 | **Craig Bellamy** | Brisbane Broncos, **Melbourne Storm** | 2002– |
| 4 | 601 | Brian Smith | Illawarra Steelers, St. George Dragons, Parramatta Eels, Newcastle Knights, Sydney Roosters | 1984–1987, 1991–1995, 1997–2012 |
| 5 | 566 | **Ricky Stuart** | Sydney Roosters, Cronulla-Sutherland Sharks, Parramatta Eels, **Canberra Raiders** | 2002–2010, 2013– |
| 6 | 506 | Des Hasler | Manly Warringah Sea Eagles, Canterbury-Bankstown Bulldogs, Gold Coast Titans | 2004–2017, 2019–2022, 2024–2025 |
| 7 | 504 (Note: Includes 4 games in 2022 considered to have been "coached remotely," despite not being physically present.) | **Ivan Cleary** | New Zealand Warriors, **Penrith Panthers**, Wests Tigers | 2006–2015, 2017– |
| 8 | 415 | Warren Ryan | Newtown Jets, Canterbury-Bankstown Bulldogs, Balmain Tigers, Western Suburbs Magpies, Newcastle Knights | 1979–1982, 1984–1994, 1999–2000 |
| 9 | 405 | Bob Fulton | Eastern Suburbs, Manly Warringah Sea Eagles | 1979–1988, 1993–1999 |
| 10 | 403 | Ron Willey | Manly Warringah Sea Eagles, Balmain Tigers, North Sydney Bears, South Sydney Rabbitohs, Penrith Panthers | 1962, 1970–1974, 1977–1985, 1988–1989 |
Source: Rugby League Project. As of 11 August 2024.

=== Most premierships won as a coach ===
| Rank | Premierships | Coach | Clubs | Years |
|---|---|---|---|---|
| 1 | 8 | Arthur Halloway | Balmain, Eastern Suburbs | 1916*, 1917*, 1919*, 1920*, 1935, 1936, 1937, 1945 |
| 2 | 7 | **Wayne Bennett** | Brisbane Broncos, St. George Illawarra Dragons | 1992, 1993, 1997^{SL}, 1998, 2000, 2006, 2010 |
| =3 | 5 | Jack Rayner | South Sydney | 1950*, 1951*, 1953*, 1954*, 1955* |
| =3 | 5 | Ken Kearney | St. George | 1957*, 1958*, 1959*, 1960*, 1961 |
| =3 | 5 | Jack Gibson | Eastern Suburbs Roosters, Parramatta Eels | 1974, 1975, 1981, 1982, 1983 |
| =6 | 4 | Charlie Lynch | South Sydney | 1928, 1929, 1931, 1932 |
| =6 | 4 | Norm Provan | St. George | 1962*, 1963*, 1964*, 1965* |
| =6 | 4 | Clive Churchill | South Sydney | 1967, 1968, 1970, 1971 |
| =6 | 4 | Tim Sheens | Canberra Raiders, Wests Tigers | 1989, 1990, 1994, 2005 |
| =6 | 4 | **Ivan Cleary** | Penrith Panthers | 2021, 2022, 2023, 2024 |
| =6 | 4 | **Trent Robinson** | Sydney Roosters | 2013, 2018, 2019, 2026 |

* – As a captain-coach

=== Oldest coaches ===
| Age | Coach | Club | Year |
|---|---|---|---|
| 76 years, 253 days | **Wayne Bennett** | South Sydney Rabbitohs | 2026 |
| 72 years, 306 days | Tim Sheens | Wests Tigers | 2023 |
| 69 years, 327 days | Arthur Hennessy | South Sydney | 1946 |
| 67 years, 337 days | **Craig Bellamy** | Melbourne Storm | 2026 |
| 65 years, 264 days | Ray Norman | Manly-Warringah | 1954 |

=== Youngest coaches ===
| Age | Coach | Club | Year |
|---|---|---|---|
| 20 years, 249 days | Gordon Favell* | University | 1933 |
| 21 years, 288 days | Johnny Slade* | Parramatta | 1955 |
| 23 years, 130 days | Neville Smith* | St. George | 1939 |
| 23 years, 131 days | Vic Bulgin* | Canterbury-Bankstown | 1951 |
| 23 years, 174 days | Bill Kelly* | Balmain | 1914 |

* All as a player-coach

== Attendance records ==
=== Largest regular season crowds ===
| Crowd | Home | Away | Venue | Year |
|---|---|---|---|---|
| 65,305 | Canterbury-Bankstown Bulldogs | South Sydney Rabbitohs | Accor Stadium | 2025 |
| 59,878 | Canterbury-Bankstown Bulldogs | Parramatta Eels | Accor Stadium | 2025 |
| 59,708 | South Sydney Rabbitohs | Sydney Roosters | ANZ Stadium | 2013 |
| 58,593 | Brisbane Broncos | St. George Dragons | ANZ Stadium | 1993 |
| 57,212 | Brisbane Broncos | Gold Coast Seagulls | ANZ Stadium | 1993 |
Source: Rugby League Tables & Statistics.

Note: Does not include double-headers

=== Largest regular season double-header crowds ===
| Crowd | Home | Away | Venue | Year |
|---|---|---|---|---|
| 104,583 | Manly Warringah Sea Eagles St. George Illawarra Dragons | Newcastle Knights Parramatta Eels | Stadium Australia | 1999 |
| 62,255 | St. George Illawarra Dragons Sydney Roosters | Cronulla-Sutherland Sharks Parramatta Eels | Stadium Australia | 2000 |
| 54,833 | Parramatta Eels Wests Tigers | Penrith Panthers Sydney Roosters | Stadium Australia | 2001 |
| 52,347 | Manly Warringah Sea Eagles Melbourne Storm | Brisbane Broncos North Queensland Cowboys | Suncorp Stadium | 2017 |
| 50,109 | Brisbane Broncos Canterbury-Bankstown Bulldogs | South Sydney Rabbitohs Gold Coast Titans | Suncorp Stadium | 2009 |

Note: Does not include Magic Round

=== Highest season average crowds ===
| Average | Team | Year |
|---|---|---|
| 43,200 | Brisbane Broncos | 1993 |
| 41,185 | Brisbane Broncos | 2025 |
| 41,161 | Brisbane Broncos | 2026 |
| 39,873 | Brisbane Broncos | 2024 |
| 37,705 | Brisbane Broncos | 1994 |
Source: Rugby League Tables & Statistics.

== See also ==
- List of players who have played 300 NRL games
- List of players with 1,000 NRL points
- List of players with 20 NRL field goals
- List of players with 100 NRL tries
- List of players with 100 NRL tries and 500 NRL goals
- List of players with 500 NRL goals
- State of Origin results and statistics
- List of NRL Under-20s records
- List of NRL Women's records

=== Current team-specific records ===
- List of Brisbane Broncos records
- List of Canberra Raiders records
- List of Canterbury-Bankstown Bulldogs records
- List of Cronulla-Sutherland Sharks records
- List of Dolphins records
- List of Gold Coast Titans records
- List of Manly Warringah Sea Eagles records
- List of Melbourne Storm records
- List of Newcastle Knights records
- List of New Zealand Warriors records
- List of North Queensland Cowboys records
- List of Parramatta Eels records
- List of Penrith Panthers records
- List of South Sydney Rabbitohs records
- List of St. George Illawarra Dragons records
- List of Sydney Roosters records
- List of Wests Tigers records
