= List of Canberra Raiders records =

Records for the Canberra Raiders have been maintained since their inception in 1982.

== Team records ==
=== Biggest wins ===
Margin	Opponent	Score	Venue	Date
68	Parramatta Eels	68-0	Bruce Stadium	22 August 1993
62	Easts	66-4	Bruce Stadium	15 April 1990
62	Penrith Panthers	74-12	Bruce Stadium	10 August 2008
56	Brisbane Broncos	56-0	Bruce Stadium	1 August 2009
56	North Queensland Cowboys	66-10	Bruce Stadium	14 April 1996
54	South Queensland Crushers	58-4	Bruce Stadium	27 August 1995
54	Wests Tigers	60-6	Bruce Stadium	23 April 2016

=== Biggest losses ===
Margin	Opponent	Score	Venue	Date
64	Melbourne Storm	4-68	Canberra Stadium	4 August 2013
51	Parramatta Eels	3-54	Belmore Oval	11 April 1982
48	Canterbury-Bankstown Bulldogs	4-52	Stadium Australia	12 August 2007
46	Newcastle Knights	6-52	Hunter Stadium	7 April 2002
46	Melbourne Storm	2-48	Melbourne Rectangular Stadium	13 August 2023
45	Illawarra Steelers	0-45	Wollongong Showground	25 April 1982
44	St George Dragons	6-50	Seiffert Oval	25 August 1985
42	St George Illawarra Dragons	2-44	Kogarah Oval	18 April 1999
42	St George Illawarra Dragons	16-58	Wollongong Showground	8 July 2007
41	Penrith Panthers	12-53	Canberra Stadium	31 March 2023

=== Most consecutive wins ===
- 11, 30 July 1989 – 25 March 1990
- 11, 18 September 1994 – 7 May 1995

=== Most consecutive losses ===
- 8, 28 July 1985 – 23 March 1986
- 8, 18 March 2011 – 14 May 2011

=== Biggest comeback ===
Trailed 22-0 against Wests Tigers to win 30-22 at Leichhardt Oval (19-4-2015). Trailed 22-0 against Newcastle Knights to win 29-25 at GIO Stadium (03-07-2016). Trailed 22-0 against Gold Coast Titans to win 24-22 at GIO Stadium (26-03-2022).

=== Attendances ===
- Seiffert Oval: 18,272 vs Brisbane Broncos, 18 June 1989
- GIO Stadium: 26,567 vs South Sydney Rabbitohs, 27 September 2019
- NRL Grand Final – 82,922 vs Sydney Roosters, 6 October 2019 at ANZ Stadium
- World Club Challenge – 30,786 vs Widnes, 4 October 1989 at Old Trafford

=== Canberra Raiders win–loss records ===
==== Active teams ====
Win–loss rates against all active teams
Teams	Played	Wins	Draws	Losses	Points for (tries–goals–field goals)	Average points for	Against points (tries–goals–field goals)	Average points against	Win%
St George Illawarra	29	17	1	11	614 (104-96-6)	21.17	626 (109-93-4)	21.59	60.34%
South Sydney Rabbitohs	54	32	0	22	1385 (247-198-7)	25.65	978 (171-144-17)	18.11	59.25%
Newcastle Knights	48	26	2	20	1187 (201-187-9)	24.73	1120 (191-175-6)	23.33	56.25%
North Queensland Cowboys	41	23	0	18	1046 (183-154-6)	25.51	825 (143-125-3)	20.12	56.09%
Parramatta Eels	56	30	0	26	1158 (204-169-6)	20.68	1171 (204-186-2)	20.91	53.57%
New Zealand Warriors	40	21	0	19	902 (158-132-6)	22.55	871 (150-132-7)	21.77	52.50%
Penrith Panthers	74	35	1	38	1567 (272-241-4)	21.18	1574 (269-251-9)	21.27	47.97%
Sydney Roosters	60	28	0	32	1174 (204-178-6)	19.57	1327 (238-195-5)	22.12	46.66%
Wests Tigers	35	16	0	19	804 (144-112-4)	22.97	749 (130-112-5)	21.40	45.71%
Gold Coast Titans	22	10	0	12	556 (99-80-0)	25.27	499 (89-71-1)	22.68	45.45%
Cronulla Sharks	71	32	0	39	1511 (262-231-3)	21.28	1490 (258-236-2)	20.99	45.07%
Canterbury Bulldogs	67	30	0	37	1347 (237-200-4)	20.10	1397 (241-218-9)	20.85	44.77%
Manly Sea Eagles	55	21	1	33	1084 (188-165-9)	19.71	1254 (215-203-6)	22.80	39.09%
Brisbane Broncos	50	19	1	30	954 (168-138-6)	19.08	1013 (175-155-3)	20.26	39.00%
Melbourne Storm	41	11	0	30	624 (110-91-2)	15.22	998 (176-146-2)	24.34	26.82%

==== Discontinued teams ====
Win–loss rates against all discontinued teams
Teams	Played	Wins	Draws	Losses	Points for (tries–goals–field goals)	Average points for	Against points (tries–goals–field goals)	Average points against	Win%
Perth	4	4	0	0	126 (23-16-2)	31.50	59 (11-7-1)	14.75	100.00%
Adelaide	3	3	0	0	116 (20-18-0)	38.67	52 (9-8-0)	17.33	100.00%
South Queensland	3	3	0	0	118 (23-13-0)	39.33	20 (4-2-0)	6.67	100.00%
Gold Coast	16	14	0	2	439 (75-69-1)	27.44	136 (25-18-0)	8.50	87.50%
Wests	27	20	1	6	773 (137-113-1)	28.63	445 (79-72-2)	16.48	75.92%
Illawarra	27	19	1	7	602 (100-102-4)	22.30	449 (74-81-3)	16.63	72.22%
St George	29	19	1	9	620 (105-102-1)	21.38	462 (79-74-7)	15.93	67.24%
Norths	38	16	0	12	598 (108-83-4)	21.36	465 (81-73-7)	16.61	57.14%
Newtown	4	2	0	2	54 (9-10-1)	13.50	74 (17-9-1)	18.50	50.00%
Hunter	2	1	0	1	30 (5-5-0)	15.00	28 (5-4-0)	14.00	50.00%
Balmain Tigers	26	10	1	15	489 (86-73-3)	18.81	535 (91-90-5)	20.58	40.38%
Northern Eagles	6	2	0	4	116 (19-20-0)	19.33	138 (24-21-0)	23.00	33.33%

== Individual records ==
=== Most first-grade games ===
- 342, Josh Papali'i (2011–2026)
- 318, Jason Croker (1991–2006)
- 307, Jarrod Croker (2009–2023)
- 244, Laurie Daley (1987–2000)
- 242, Jack Wighton (2012–2023)
- 240, Joseph Tapine (2016–)
- 234, Simon Woolford (1994–2006)
- 228, Steve Walters (1986–1996)
- 224, Ruben Wiki (1993–2004)
- 220, Alan Tongue (2000–2011)
- 214, Jordan Rapana (2014–2024)
- 205, Elliott Whitehead (2016–2024)
- 203, Ricky Stuart (1988–1998)
- 202, Chris O'Sullivan (1982–1990, 1992)

=== Most tries in a match ===
- 5 - Mal Meninga against Eastern Suburbs Roosters at Bruce Stadium (15 April 1990)

=== Most goals in a match ===
- 10, David Furner against Parramatta Eels at Bruce Stadium (22 August 1993)
- 10, Terry Campese against Penrith Panthers at Bruce Stadium (10 August 2008)

=== Most points in a match ===
- 38, (5 tries, 9 goals), Mal Meninga against Easts at Bruce Stadium (15 April 1990)
- 36, (4 tries, 10 goals), Terry Campese against Penrith Panthers at Canberra Stadium (10 August 2008)

=== Most tries in a season ===
- 23, Jordan Rapana in 2016
- 22, Noa Nadruku in 1993
- 22, Jason Croker in 1994
- 22, Brett Mullins in 1994
- 21, Noa Nadruku in 1996
- 21, Joel Monaghan in 2003
- 20, John Ferguson in 1988

=== Most tries for club ===
- 136, Jarrod Croker (2009–2023)
- 120, Jason Croker (1991–2006)
- 106, Jordan Rapana (2014–2024)
- 105, Brett Mullins (1990–2000)
- 87, Laurie Daley (1987–2000)
- 75, Jack Wighton (2012–2023)
- 74, Mal Meninga (1986–1994)
- 73, Noa Nadruku (1993–1997)
- 69, Gary Belcher (1986–1993)
- 69, Joel Monaghan (2001–2004, 2008–2010)

=== Most points in a season ===
- 296 (18 tries, 112 goals), Jarrod Croker in 2016
- 245 (10 tries, 102 goals, 1 field goal), Clinton Schifcofske in 2001
- 236 (12 tries, 94 goals), Jarrod Croker in 2015
- 228 (13 tries, 88 goals), Jarrod Croker in 2019
- 226 (16 tries, 81, goals), Jarrod Croker in 2012
- 222 (8 tries, 94 goals, 2 field goals), Clinton Schifcofske in 2003
- 218 (10 tries, 89 goals) Gary Belcher in 1988
- 212 (17 tries, 72 goals) Mal Meninga in 1990
- 202 (18 tries, 65 goals), Jarrod Croker in 2014
- 198 (10 tries, 79 goals) David Furner in 1995
- 196 (6 tries, 86 goals) David Furner in 1994
- 193 (5 tries, 86 goals, 1 field goal), Ron Giteau in 1983

=== Most points for club ===
- 2,374 (136 tries, 915 goals), Jarrod Croker (2009–2023)
- 1,218 (49 tries, 511 goals), David Furner (1992–2000)
- 1,052 (44 tries, 432 goals, 12 field goals), Clinton Schifcofske (2001–2006)
- 864 (74 tries, 283 goals, 2 field goals), Mal Meninga (1986–1994)
- 572 (69 tries, 148 goals), Gary Belcher (1986–1993)
- 527 (14 tries, 234 goals, 3 field goals), Ron Giteau (1983–1986)
- 496 (106 tries, 35 goals, 2 field goals), Jordan Rapana (2014–2024)

Updated August 24, 2024

== Individual competition honours ==
=== Clive Churchill Medal ===
Awarded to NRL Grand Final Player of the Match

- 1989 – Bradley Clyde
- 1990 – Ricky Stuart
- 1991 – Bradley Clyde
- 1994 – David Furner
- 2019 – Jack Wighton

=== Dally M Medal ===
Awarded to NRL Season Player of the Year

- 1993 – Ricky Stuart
- 1995 – Laurie Daley
- 2020 – Jack Wighton

=== Golden Boot Award ===
Awarded to World's Best Rugby League Player of the Year

- 1989 – Mal Meninga

=== Jack Gibson Medal ===
Awarded to National Youth Competition Grand Final Player of the Match

- 2008 - Josh Dugan

=== Preston Campbell Medal ===
Awarded to the All Star Player of the Match

- 2011- Josh Dugan
- 2022- Joseph Tapine

== Mal Meninga Medal ==
Awarded to Canberra Raiders NRL Player of the Season.

Season	Winner
1982	Jon Hardy
1983	Steve O'Callaghan
1984	Chris O'Sullivan
1985	Chris O'Sullivan
1986	Gary Belcher
1987	Gary Belcher
1988	Ricky Stuart
1989	Bradley Clyde
1990	Laurie Daley
1991	Steve Walters
1992	Ricky Stuart
1993	Ricky Stuart
1994	John Lomax
1995	Laurie Daley
1996	Laurie Daley
1997	Laurie Daley
1998	Mark McLinden
1999	Laurie Daley
2000	Laurie Daley
2001	Clinton Schifcofske
2002	Ruben Wiki
2003	Ruben Wiki
2004	Clinton Schifcofske
2005	Troy Thompson; Josh Miller
2006	Alan Tongue
2007	Scott Logan
2008	Joel Monaghan
2009	Josh Dugan; Josh Miller
2010	David Shillington
2011	Shaun Fensom
2012	Shaun Fensom
2013	Anthony Milford
2014	Jarrod Croker
2015	Sia Soliola
2016	Josh Hodgson; Josh Papalii
2017	Junior Paulo
2018	Josh Papalii
2019	Josh Papalii
2020	Jack Wighton; Josh Papalii
2021	Jordan Rapana
2022	Joseph Tapine
2023	Joseph Tapine
2024	Joseph Tapine
2025	Joseph Tapine

Players who have received the medal more than once:

- Laurie Daley = 6
- Josh Papali'i = 4
- Joseph Tapine = 4
- Ricky Stuart = 3
- Chris O'Sullivan = 2
- Gary Belcher = 2
- Ruben Wiki = 2
- Clinton Schifcofske = 2
- Josh Miller = 2
- Shaun Fensom = 2

== Season summaries ==
Season	Pos	Pld	W	D	L	B	F	A	+/-	Pts	Notes	Crowd*
1982	14th	26	4	0	22	N/A	269	862	−593	8	Wooden Spoon	10,825
1983	10th	26	9	0	17	N/A	495	614	−119	18		9,798
1984	6th	24	13	0	11	2	379	394	−15	30	Lost in Play Off for 5th	10,639
1985	10th	24	8	2	14	2	432	534	−102	22		7,833
1986	11th	24	8	1	15	2	391	413	−22	21		6,851
1987	3rd	24	15	0	9	2	441	325	116	34	Runners-Up	6,918
1988	3rd	22	15	0	7	N/A	596	346	250	30	Lost in Minor Semi	9,988
1989	4th	22	14	0	8	N/A	457	287	170	28	Premiers	9,241
1990	1st	22	16	1	5	N/A	532	245	287	33	Premiers	13,542
1991	4th	22	14	0	8	N/A	452	327	125	28	Runners-Up	14,587
1992	12th	22	10	0	12	N/A	435	409	26	20		11,103
1993	3rd	22	16	1	5	N/A	587	272	315	33	Lost in Minor Semi	14,569
1994	3rd	22	17	0	5	N/A	677	298	379	34	Premiers	17,392
1995	2nd	22	20	0	2	N/A	634	255	379	40	Lost in Preliminary Final	15,683
1996	6th	21	13	1	7	N/A	538	384	154	27	Lost in Elimination Final	10,440
1997	3rd	18	11	0	7	N/A	436	337	99	22	Lost in Preliminary Final	11,622
1998	7th	24	15	0	9	N/A	564	429	135	30	Lost in Minor Semi	10,135
1999	9th	24	13	1	10	2	618	439	179	31		12,057
2000	4th	26	15	0	11	N/A	506	479	27	30	Lost in Semi Final	12,186
2001	11th	26	9	1	16	N/A	600	623	−23	19		9,780
2002	8th	24	10	1	13	2	471	641	−170	25	Lost in Qualifying Final	10,348
2003	4th	24	16	0	8	2	620	463	157	36	Lost in Semi Final	13,422
2004	8th	24	11	0	13	2	554	613	−59	26	Lost in Qualifying Final	11,116
2005	14th	24	9	0	15	2	465	606	−141	22		12,404
2006	7th	24	13	0	11	2	525	573	−48	30	Lost in Qualifying Final	11,489
2007	14th	24	9	0	15	1	522	652	−150	20		11,512
2008	6th	24	13	0	11	2	640	527	113	30	Lost in Qualifying Final	11,913
2009	13th	24	9	0	15	2	489	510	−31	22		11,027
2010	7th	24	13	0	11	2	499	493	6	30	Lost in Semi Final	12,373
2011	15th	24	6	0	18	2	423	623	−200	16		12,313
2012	6th	24	13	0	11	2	545	536	9	30	Lost in Semi Final	11,925
2013	13th	24	10	0	14	2	434	624	-190	24		10,226
2014	15th	24	8	0	16	2	466	623	-157	20		9,608
2015	10th	24	10	0	14	2	577	569	8	24		9,629
2016	2nd	24	17	1	6	2	688	456	232	39	Lost in Preliminary Final	12,183
2017	10th	24	11	0	13	2	558	497	61	26		13,934
2018	10th	24	10	0	14	1	563	540	23	22		11,862
2019	4th	24	15	0	9	1	524	374	150	32	Runners-Up	14,864
2020	5th	20	14	0	6	0	445	317	128	28	Lost in Preliminary Final	4,013
2021	10th	24	10	0	14	1	481	578	-97	22		13,551
2022	8th	24	14	0	10	1	524	461	63	30	Lost in Semi Final	13,028
2023	8th	24	13	0	11	3	486	623	-137	32	Lost in Elimination Final	14,403
2024	9th	24	12	0	12	3	474	601	-127	30		13,958 (Note: Excluding Magic round home game)
Season	Pos	Pld	W	D	L	B	F	A	+/-	Pts	Notes	Crowd*

Colour	Result
Yellow	Premiers
Dark Green	Runners-up
Light Green	Qualified for finals
Red	Wooden spoon

* Average home crowd

== See also ==
- List of NRL records
