= List of NRL Under-20s records =

These are the records of the National Youth Competition, which is a rugby league competition in Australia, beginning in 2008.

== Biggest wins ==
Margin	Score	Winning team	Losing team	Venue	Date
78	84–6	Cronulla-Sutherland Sharks	Wests Tigers	Southern Cross Group Stadium	17 June 2017 (Round 15)
78	78–0	Penrith Panthers	Gold Coast Titans	CUA Stadium	25 August 2012 (Round 25)
68	78–10	Cronulla-Sutherland Sharks	Manly Warringah Sea Eagles	Toyota Park	19 March 2012 (Round 3)
68	74–6	Brisbane Broncos	Melbourne Storm	AAMI Park	21 June 2015 (Round 15)
66	78–12	North Queensland Cowboys	Canberra Raiders	1300SMILES Stadium	1 August 2015 (Round 21)
64	74–10	Penrith Panthers	Canberra Raiders	Carrington Park	30 April 2016 (Round 9)
64	74–10	Penrith Panthers	New Zealand Warriors	Pepper Stadium	14 May 2016 (Round 10)

== Highest scoring matches ==
Total	Score	Winning team	Losing team	Venue	Date
96	64–32	Penrith Panthers	Newcastle Knights	CUA Stadium	5 June 2010 (Round 13)
90	78–12	North Queensland Cowboys	Canberra Raiders	1300SMILES Stadium	1 August 2015 (Round 21)
90	52–38	Canberra Raiders	Manly Warringah Sea Eagles	GIO Stadium	25 August 2013 (Round 24)
90	84–6	Cronulla-Sutherland Sharks	Wests Tigers	Southern Cross Group Stadium	17 June 2017 (Round 15)
88	78–10	Cronulla-Sutherland Sharks	Manly Warringah Sea Eagles	Toyota Park	1 9 March 2012 (Round 23)
88	56–32	Wests Tigers	Sydney Roosters	Sydney Football Stadium	9 August 2009 (round 22)
88	52–36	Bulldogs	Canberra Raiders	Canberra Stadium	2 6 April 2009 (round 7)

== Lowest scoring matches ==
Total	Score	Winning team	Losing team	Venue	Date
10	6–4	St George Illawarra Dragons	Cronulla-Sutherland Sharks	ANZ Stadium	5 April 2008 (round 4)
17	9–8	Cronulla Sharks	Manly Warringah Sea Eagles	Toyota Park	12 July 2008 (round 18)
18	18–0	South Sydney Rabbitohs	Wests Tigers	ANZ Stadium	12 May 2017 (round 10)
19	19–0	New Zealand Warriors	St George Illawarra Dragons	Mt Smart Stadium	6 June 2010 (round 13)
22	14–8	Brisbane Broncos	Parramatta Eels	Suncorp Stadium	24 August 2017 (round 25)
24	14–10	Sydney Roosters	South Sydney Rabbitohs	ANZ Stadium	14 March 2008 (round 1)
24	14–10	North Queensland Cowboys	Melbourne Storm	Olympic Park	21 June 2008 (round 15)

== Winning streaks ==
Wins	Team	Start of streak	Date	End of streak	Date
15	Cronulla Sharks	52–16 vs Gold Coast Titans	22 April 2017	36–12 vs North Queensland Cowboys	19 August 2017
13	Penrith Panthers	46–6 vs Canterbury-Bankstown Bulldogs	10 March 2016	24–16 vs Wests Tigers	2 July 2016
10	St George Illawarra Dragons	28–4 vs Gold Coast Titans	24 March 2008	30–28 vs South Sydney Rabbitohs	1 June 2008
7	Gold Coast Titans	24–18 vs Cronulla-Sutherland Sharks	1 June 2008	44–22 vs Penrith Panthers	19 July 2008
7	Brisbane Broncos	32–12 vs New Zealand Warriors	9 August 2008	28–26 vs New Zealand Warriors	27 September 2008
6	Canberra Raiders	38–28 vs St. George Illawarra Dragons	13 July 2008	56–20 vs Newcastle Knights	17 August 2008

== Losing streaks ==
Losses	Team	Start of streak	Date	End of streak	Date
13	Sydney Roosters	10–38 vs Bulldogs (round 4)	4 April 2008	24–37 vs Canberra Raiders (round 19)	20 July 2008
7	Cronulla-Sutherland Sharks	8–40 vs Brisbane Broncos (round 10)	17 May 2008	10–24 vs Canberra Raiders (round 16)	30 June 2008
6	North Queensland Cowboys	18–36 vs Melbourne Storm (round 7)	26 April 2008	22–42 vs Wests Tigers (round 13)	7 June 2008
6	Melbourne Storm	18–42 vs Manly Warringah Sea Eagles (round 6)	16 April 2010	16–46 vs Canterbury-Bankstown Bulldogs (round 12)	30 May 2010

New Zealand Warriors have been involved in two consecutive drawn matches. The first match was a 26–26 draw against the Bulldogs in round 5 on 13 April 2008 at Mt Smart Stadium, Auckland. This was followed with a 24–24 draw against the North Queensland Cowboys in round 6 on 19 April 2008 at Dairy Farmers Stadium, Townsville.

== Biggest comeback ==
- 28 points by Brisbane Broncos. Trailed 28–0 at halftime to win 34–32 against the South Sydney Rabbitohs on 22 June 2012 at Suncorp Stadium.
- 28 points by Cronulla-Sutherland Sharks. Trailed 34–6 at halftime against the Melbourne Storm before winning 48–40 at Southern Cross Group Stadium in round 4, 2016.

=== Biggest finals comeback ===
- 22 points when the Sydney Roosters trailed the Penrith Panthers 28–6 at halftime in the 2016 Grand Final, before winning 30–28.

== See also ==
- State of Origin results and statistics
- List of NRL records
