= List of Parramatta Eels records =

== Club records ==
=== Biggest wins ===
Margin	Opponent	Score	Venue	Date
70	Cronulla-Sutherland Sharks	74-4	Parramatta Stadium	23 August 2003
62	North Queensland Cowboys	62-0	Parramatta Stadium	29 July 2001
58	Western Suburbs Magpies	68-10	Campbelltown Stadium	18 July 1999
58	Penrith Panthers	64-6	Parramatta Stadium	17 March 2002
58	Brisbane Broncos	58-0	Bankwest Stadium	15 September 2019

=== Eels' biggest losses ===
Margin	Opponent	Score	Venue	Date
68	Canberra Raiders	0-68	Bruce Stadium	22 August 1993
60	Melbourne Storm	4-64	AAMI Park	25 August 2013
57	St. George Dragons	4-61	Cumberland Oval	7 June 1959
54	Melbourne Storm	10-64	Suncorp Stadium	11 May 2019
54	Manly Warringah Sea Eagles	0-54	Brookvale Oval	18 March 2018

=== Biggest wins vs current NRL clubs ===
Margin	Score	Opposition	Venue	Date
70	74–4	Cronulla-Sutherland Sharks	Parramatta Stadium	23 August 2003
62	62–0	North Queensland Cowboys	Parramatta Stadium	29 July 2001
58	64–6	Penrith Panthers	Parramatta Stadium	17 March 2002
58	58–0	Brisbane Broncos	Bankwest Stadium	15 September 2019
54	66–12	Wests Tigers	Leichhardt Oval	29 April 2001
54	54–0	South Sydney Rabbitohs	Parramatta Stadium	10 August 2002
52	56–4	Canterbury-Bankstown Bulldogs	Parramatta Stadium	12 August 2005
51	54–3	Canberra Raiders	Belmore Sports Ground	11 April 1982
56	66–10	Newcastle Knights	CommBank Stadium	7 September 2025
44	54–10	Melbourne Storm	Colonial Stadium	20 July 2001
44	56–12	New Zealand Warriors	Parramatta Stadium	9 September 2001
40	52–12	Manly Warringah Sea Eagles	Parramatta Stadium	13 June 2004
40	46–6	Gold Coast Titans	Cbus Super Stadium	22 March 2020
36	36–0; 40–4	St. George Illawarra Dragons	Pirtek Stadium; ANZ Stadium	17 May 2014; 11 August 2018
33	33–0	Eastern Suburbs Roosters	Sydney Cricket Ground	19 September 1982
28	48–20	Dolphins	Sunshine Coast Stadium	24 June 2023

=== Biggest losses vs current NRL clubs ===
Margin	Score	Opposition	Venue	Date
68	0–68	Canberra Raiders	Bruce Stadium	22 August 1993
60	4–64	Melbourne Storm	AAMI Park	25 August 2013
54	0–54	Manly Warringah Sea Eagles	Lottoland	18 March 2018
52	4–56	Sydney Roosters	Sydney Football Stadium	15 March 2014
50	6–56	South Sydney Rabbitohs	ANZ Stadium	8 August 2011
48	6–54	Newcastle Knights	Hunter Stadium	8 September 2013
48	0–48	New Zealand Warriors	Mt. Smart Stadium	12 July 2014
46	14–60	Brisbane Broncos	Parramatta Stadium	25 June 1995
42	4–46	North Queensland Cowboys	1300SMILES Stadium	27 July 2015
42	10—52	Gold Coast Titans	CommBank Stadium	12 April 2026
37	0–37	St. George Illawarra Dragons	WIN Jubilee Oval	4 September 2009
36	6–42	Canterbury-Bankstown Bulldogs	Belmore Sports Ground	12 April 1993
34	6–40	Penrith Panthers	Cbus Super Stadium	3 September 2021
30	18–48	Cronulla-Sutherland Sharks	Parramatta Stadium	13 August 1995
28	16–44	Dolphins	TIO Stadium	19 April 2024
27	6–33	Wests Tigers	Leichhardt Oval	30 May 2004

=== Biggest wins vs former clubs ===
Margin	Score	Opposition	Venue	Date
58	68–10	Western Suburbs Magpies	Campbelltown Stadium	18 July 1999
50	55–5	Illawarra Steelers	Belmore Sports Ground	30 May 1982
50	54–4	Newtown Jets	Belmore Sports Ground	5 June 1983
42	52–10	South Queensland Crushers	Parramatta Stadium	8 June 1997
40	40–0	Gold Coast Seagulls	Parramatta Stadium	8 July 1990
40	44–4	North Sydney Bears	North Sydney Oval	25 July 1999
36	38–2	Balmain Tigers	Belmore Sports Ground	13 June 1982
30	36–6	St. George Dragons	Parramatta Stadium	16 March 1986
12	18–6	Western Reds	Parramatta Stadium	28 July 1996
8	10–2	Adelaide Rams	Pioneer Oval	16 May 1998

=== Biggest losses vs former clubs ===
Margin	Score	Opposition	Venue	Date
57	4–61	St. George	Cumberland Oval	7 June 1959
42	10–52	Western Suburbs	Lidcombe Oval	11 June 1972
40	12–52	Illawarra Steelers	Steelers Stadium	16 July 1995
35	7–42	Newtown	Cumberland Oval	13 April 1957
34	0–34	North Sydney Bears	North Sydney Oval	9 June 1974
33	14–47	Balmain	Leichhardt Oval	2 August 1947
20	6–26	Gold Coast Seagulls	Seagulls Stadium	23 May 1992
19	14–33	South Queensland Crushers	Suncorp Stadium	30 April 1995
10	14–24	Western Reds	WACA Ground	21 July 1995
–	–	Adelaide Rams	–	–

=== Streaks ===
Most consecutive wins

- 12 matches, 18 April - 24 July 1964
- 12 matches, 2 April - 26 June 1977

Most consecutive losses

- 19 matches, 24 May 1959 - 13 June 1960

=== Comebacks ===
Biggest comeback

Recovered from a 22-point deficit.

- Trailed Canberra 22-0 at halftime to win 30-22 at Parramatta Stadium (26 April 1987)

Worst collapse

Surrendered a 24-point lead.

- Led North Queensland Cowboys 24-6 at halftime to lose 36-30 at Pirtek Stadium, Sydney (8 June 2015)

Tigers up 31-0 with not much time on the clock and Parramatta Eels managed to get 5 converted tries to make the game 30-31.

== Individual records ==
=== Most first grade games ===
- 330, Nathan Hindmarsh (1998–2012)
- 265, Brett Kenny (1980–1993)
- 264, Luke Burt (1999–2012)
- 259, Ray Price (1976–1986)
- 259, Nathan Cayless (1997–2010)
- 233, Tim Mannah (2009–2019)
- 228, Peter Sterling (1978–1992)
- 223, Junior Paulo (2013–2016, 2019–)
- 217, Bob O'Reilly (1967–1975, 1980–1982)
- 216, Mick Cronin (1977–1986)
- 206, Clinton Gutherson (2016–2024)
- 205, Mark Laurie (1982–1992)
- 204, Daniel Wagon (1999–2008)
- 201, Fuifui Moimoi (2004–2014)

=== Most tries in a match ===
- 5, Jamie Lyon against Cronulla-Sutherland Sharks at Parramatta Stadium (August 23, 2003), Parramatta won 74-4.
- 4, Mitchell Wallace against Balmain Tigers at Parramatta Stadium (April 23, 1949), Parramatta won 20-6.
- 4, Dick Thornett against Canterbury at Cumberland Oval (July 21, 1968), Parramatta won 48-9.
- 4, Owen Stephens against South Sydney Rabbitohs at Redfern Oval (May 24, 1975), Parramatta lost 28-35.
- 4, Ray Price against South Sydney Rabbitohs at Redfern Oval (August 13, 1978), Parramatta won 50-10.
- 4, Eric Grothe Sr. against Canberra Raiders at Belmore Sports Ground (April 11, 1982), Parramatta won 54-3.
- 4, Eric Grothe Sr. against Western Suburbs Magpies at Belmore Sport Ground (July 1, 1984), Parramatta won 46-12.
- 4, Paul Taylor against Canberra Raiders at Parramatta Stadium (April 24, 1988), Parramatta won 40-12.
- 4, Matt Petersen against South Sydney Rabbitohs at Parramatta Stadium (May 31, 2003), Parramatta won 28-4.
- 4, Jarryd Hayne against Newcastle Knights at Parramatta Stadium (July 8, 2006), Parramatta won 46-12.
- 4, Semi Radradra against St George Illawarra Dragons at WIN Stadium (March 12, 2017), Parramatta won 34-16.
- 4, Semi Radradra against Brisbane Broncos at Suncorp Stadium (August 24, 2017), Parramatta won 52-34.
- 4, Maika Sivo against North Queensland Cowboys at Bankwest Stadium (July 3, 2020), Parramatta won 42-4.

=== Most goals in a match ===
- 11, Mick Cronin against Illawarra Steelers at Belmore Sports Ground (May 30, 1982)
- 11, Jason Taylor against Wests Tigers at Leichhardt Oval (April 29, 2001)
- 10, Brian Jones against Canterbury at Cumberland Oval (August 20, 1955)
- 10, Mick Cronin against Newtown Jets at Henson Park (August 20, 1978)
- 10, Clinton Schifcofske against Western Suburbs Magpies at Campbelltown Stadium (July 18, 1999)
- 10, Luke Burt against Penrith Panthers at Parramatta Stadium (March 17, 2002)

=== Most points in a match ===
- 28 (2 tries, 10 goals), Luke Burt against Penrith Panthers at Parramatta Stadium (March 17, 2002), Parramatta won 64-6.
- 28 (3 tries, 8 goals), Luke Burt against Canberra Raiders at Parramatta Stadium (August 28, 2005), Parramatta won 48-10.
- 27 (3 tries, 9 goals), Mick Cronin against North Sydney Bears at North Sydney Oval (May 13, 1979), Parramatta won 48-17.
- 27 (3 tries, 9 goals), Mick Cronin against Canberra Raiders at Belmore Sports Ground (April 11, 1982), Parramatta won 54-3.

(Mick Cronins' tallies in today's game would be 30 points in a game, as the value of a try was worth 3 points until the 1983 season.)

=== Most tries in a season ===
- 24, Semi Radradra in 2015
- 23, Steve Ella in 1982
- 22, Semi Radradra in 2017
- 22, Maika Sivo in 2019
- 21, Brett Kenny in 1983
- 20, Neil Hunt in 1983
- 19, Josh Addo-Carr in 2025
- 19, Semi Radradra in 2014
- 19, Bevan French in 2016

=== Most tries for club ===
- 124, Luke Burt (1999–2012)
- 113, Jarryd Hayne (2006–2014, 2018)
- 110, Brett Kenny (1980–1993)
- 104, Maika Sivo (2019–2024)
- 96, Clint Gutherson (2016–2024)
- 94, Steve Ella (1979–1988)
- 82, Semi Radradra (2013–2017)
- 78, Ray Price (1976–1986)
- 78, Eric Grothe Sr. (1979–1989)
- 75, Mick Cronin (1977–1986)

=== Most points in a season ===
- 282 (16 tries, 117 goals) Mick Cronin in 1978
- 279 (11 tries, 123 goals) Mick Cronin in 1982
- 265 (8 tries, 116 goals, 1 field goal) Jason Taylor in 2001
- 253 (15 tries, 104 goals) Mick Cronin in 1979
- 226 (4 tries, 105 goals) Mick Cronin in 1983
- 225 (7 tries, 101 goals, 2 field goals) Mick Cronin in 1977
- 220 (7 tries, 95 goals, 2 field goals) Mitchell Moses in 2022
- 217 (15 tries, 77 goals, 3 field goals) Luke Burt in 2009
- 214 (11 tries, 85 goals) Luke Burt in 2005
- 204 (6 tries, 90 goals) Mick Cronin in 1985

=== Most points for club ===
- 1,971 (75 tries, 865 goals, 2 field goals), Mick Cronin (1977–1986)
- 1,793 (124 tries, 646 goals, 5 field goals), Luke Burt (1999–2012)
- 1,198 (41 tries, 511 goals, 12 field goals), Mitchell Moses (2017– )
- 643 (90 tries, 141 goals, 1 field goal), Clinton Gutherson (2016–2024)
- 548 (93 tries, 104 goals, 6 field goals), Steve Ella (1979–1988)
- 460 (24 tries, 194 goals), Arch Brown (1965–1969)
- 459 (113 tries, 2 goals, 3 field goals), Jarryd Hayne (2006–2014, 2018)
- 444 (21 tries, 180 goals) Clinton Schifcofske (1998–2000)
- 410 (110 tries) Brett Kenny (1980–1993)

== Honours ==
=== Premierships ===
Year	Opponent	Score
1981	Newtown Jets	20-11
1982	Manly Warringah Sea Eagles	21-8
1983	Manly Warringah Sea Eagles	18-6
1986	Canterbury-Bankstown	4-2

=== Runners-up ===
Year	Opponent	Score
1976	Manly Warringah Sea Eagles	10-13
1977	St. George Dragons	9-9
1977 Replay	St. George Dragons	0-22
1984	Canterbury-Bankstown	4-6
2001	Newcastle Knights	24-30
2009	Melbourne Storm (premiership stripped for salary cap breach)	16-23
2022	Penrith Panthers	12-28

=== Minor premierships (5) ===
1977, 1982, 1986, 2001, 2005

=== Finals appearances (31) ===
1962, 1963, 1964, 1965, 1971, 1975, 1976, 1977, 1978, 1979, 1981, 1982, 1983, 1984, 1985, 1986, 1997 {ARL}, 1998, 1999, 2000, 2001, 2002, 2005, 2006, 2007, 2009, 2017, 2019, 2020, 2021, 2022

=== Rothmans Medal winners ===
- Ray Higgs (1976)
- Mick Cronin (1977, 1978)
- Ray Price (1979)
- Peter Sterling (1987, 1990)

=== Clive Churchill Medal ===
- Peter Sterling (1986)

=== Player of the Year (Ken Thornett Medal) ===
- Jason Smith (1998)
- Michael Vella (1999)
- Nathan Hindmarsh (2000)
- Nathan Hindmarsh (2000)
- Nathan Hindmarsh (2001)
- Nathan Hindmarsh (2002)
- Daniel Wagon (2003)
- Nathan Hindmarsh (2004)
- Nathan Cayless & Timana Tahu (2005)
- Nathan Hindmarsh (2006)
- Nathan Hindmarsh (2007)
- Nathan Hindmarsh (2008)
- Jarryd Hayne (2009)
- Jarryd Hayne (2010)
- Fuifui Moimoi (2011)
- Nathan Hindmarsh (2012)
- Darcy Lussick (2013)
- Chris Sandow (2014)
- Tim Mannah (2015)
- Manu Ma'u (2016)
- Nathan Brown (2017)
- Daniel Alvaro (2018)
- Mitchell Moses (2019)
- Clinton Gutherson (2020)
- Isaiah Papali'i (2021)
- Shaun Lane (2022)
- Clinton Gutherson (2023)
- Reagan Campbell-Gillard (2024)
- Jack Williams (2025)
- Brian Kelly & Jack Williams (2026)

== Dally M Awards ==
=== Dally M Medal winners ===
- Ray Price (1982)
- Peter Sterling (1986, 1987)
- Jarryd Hayne (2009, 2014*) - *co-winner

=== Dally M Fullback of the Year ===
- Jarryd Hayne (2009, 2014)
- Clinton Gutherson (2020)

=== Dally M Winger of the Year ===
- Eric Grothe Jr (2005)
- Jarryd Hayne (2007)
- Semi Radradra (2014, 2015)

=== Dally M Centre of the Year ===
- Mick Cronin (1980, 1981, 1983)
- Steve Ella (1982, 1984, 1985)

=== Dally M Halfback of the Year ===
- Peter Sterling (1983, 1984, 1986, 1987)
- Mitchell Moses (2019)

=== Dally M Prop of the Year ===
- Dean Pay (1998)

=== Dally M Hooker of the Year ===
- Brad Drew (2001)

=== Dally M Second-Rower of the Year ===
- Peter Wynn (1985)
- Nathan Hindmarsh (2000, 2001, 2004, 2005, 2006)
- Isaiah Papali'i (2021)

=== Dally M Lock of the Year ===
- Ray Price (1982, 1983, 1984, 1985, 1986)
- Jim Dymock (1996)
- Jason Smith (1999)
- Daniel Wagon (2001)

=== Dally M Rookie of the Year ===
- David Liddiard (1983)
- Michael Vella (1999)
- Tim Smith (2005)
- Jarryd Hayne (2006)

=== Dally M Coach of the Year ===
- Jack Gibson (1982)
- Brian Smith (2001)

=== Provan-Summons Medal ===
- Nathan Hindmarsh (2005, 2006, 2007, 2008, 2011)
- Clinton Gutherson (2017)

== See also ==
- List of NRL records
