= List of Sydney Roosters records =

Below is a list of the records that the Sydney Roosters have achieved since 1908.

== Sydney Roosters win–loss record ==
=== Active teams ===
Win–loss rates against all active teams (2021)
Teams	Played	Wins	Draws	Losses	Points for (tries-goals-field goals)	Average points for	Against points (tries-goals-field goals)	Average points against	Win%
Wests Tigers	35	26	0	9	995 (173–149–5)	28.43	573 (100–85–3)	16.37	74.28%
North Queensland Cowboys	39	27	0	12	1031 (178–158–3)	26.44	799 (139–120–3)	20.49	69.23%
Cronulla-Sutherland Sharks	97	61	2	34	1869 (338–308–13)	19.27	1652 (277–301–6)	17.03	63.91%
Newcastle Knights	55	33	2	20	1218 (210–188–2)	22.15	964 (160–160–4)	17.53	61.81%
Penrith Panthers	93	56	1	36	1932 (340–342–7)	20.77	1496 (255–258–14)	16.09	60.75%
Gold Coast Titans	20	12	0	8	469 (81–72–1)	23.45	375 (64–59–1)	18.75	60.00%
Canberra Raiders	66	36	0	30	1449 (258–216–5)	21.95	1276 (221–195–6)	19.33	54.54%
Canterbury-Bankstown Bulldogs	176	91	5	80	3144 (567–595–17)	17.86	2801 (477–559–11)	15.91	53.12%
St George Illawarra Dragons	43	22	1	20	850 (145–133–4)	19.77	808 (137–129–2)	18.79	52.32%
Parramatta Eels	133	66	5	62	2416 (425–463–9)	18.17	2116 (368–411–8)	15.91	51.50%
South Sydney Rabbitohs	224	103	5	116	3516 (639–651–19)	15.70	3515 (653–650–29)	15.69	47.09%
New Zealand Warriors	42	19	1	22	975 (172–141–5)	23.21	758 (131–114–6)	18.05	46.42%
Melbourne Storm	41	18	0	23	752 (126–120–8)	18.34	848 (147–128–4)	20.68	43.90%
Brisbane Broncos	52	22	0	30	1004 (172–156–4)	19.31	1145 (200–171–3)	22.02	43.30%
Manly Warringah Sea Eagles	134	47	2	85	2048 (339–419–10)	15.28	2642 (464–499–19)	19.72	35.82%

=== Defunct teams ===
Win–loss rates against all discontinued teams (2021)
Teams	Played	Wins	Draws	Losses	Points for (tries-goals-field goals)	Average points for	Against points (tries-goals-field goals)	Average points against	Win%
Newcastle (1908–09)	2	2	0	0	52 (10–11–0)	26.00	33 (7–6–0)	16.50	100.00%
Perth	2	2	0	0	47 (8–7–1)	23.50	16 (3–2–0)	8.00	100.00%
Cumberland	1	1	0	0	26 (6–4–0)	26.00	5 (1–1–0)	5.00	100.00%
Adelaide	1	1	0	0	50 (9–7–0)	50.00	12 (2–2–0)	12.00	100.00%
Annandale	22	20	1	1	415 (89–74–0)	18.86	146 (30–27–1)	6.64	93.18%
Gold Coast	18	16	0	2	471 (83–69–1)	26.17	256 (44–39–2)	14.22	88.88%
University	31	25	0	6	840 (190–135–0)	27.10	310 (64–58–1)	10.00	80.64%
South Queensland	4	3	0	1	103 (18–15–1)	25.75	56 (10–8–0)	14.00	75.00%
North Sydney	176	117	9	50	3083 (595–589–25)	17.52	2402 (436–500–14)	13.65	69.03%
Western Suburbs	182	106	6	70	3009 (562–597–17)	16.53	2493 (472–498–13)	13.70	59.89%
Newtown	147	82	9	56	2402 (457–498–13)	16.34	1938 (375–394–11)	13.18	58.84%
Glebe	42	23	3	16	569 (103–127–3)	13.55	450 (96–80–1)	10.71	58.33%
Northern Eagles	6	3	0	3	159 (28–23–1)	26.50	139 (22–25–1)	23.17	50.00%
Illawarra	30	14	1	15	556 (93–97–1)	18.53	517 (89–81–3)	17.23	48.33%
Balmain	177	82	7	88	2654 (492–533–13)	14.99	2446 (457–500–9)	13.82	48.30%
St George	161	62	9	90	2184 (393–449–20)	13.57	2522 (467–493–30)	15.66	41.30%
Totals	1002	559	45	488	16620 (4163–4111–112)				73.2325%

== Individual records ==
=== Most first grade games ===
Name	Seasons	Games
Jared Waerea-Hargreaves	2010–2024	310
Mitchell Aubusson	2007–2020	306
Daniel Tupou	2012–2026	307
Anthony Minichiello	2000–2014	302
Luke Ricketson	1991–2005	301
Jake Friend	2007–2021	264
Mitchell Pearce	2007–2017	238
Kevin Hastings	1976–1987	232
Craig Fitzgibbon	2000–2009	228
Shaun Kenny-Dowall	2007–2017	224
Brad Fittler	1996–2004	217
James Tedesco	2018–	205
Isaac Liu	2013–2021	203

=== Most points ===
Name	Seasons	Points
Craig Fitzgibbon	2000–2009	1,454 (36 T, 655 G)
Allan Flipper McKean	1967–1973	903 (18 T, 422 G, 3 FG)
Sam Walker	2021-	806 (34T, 331G, 8 FG)
Daniel Tupou	2012–2026	780 (195T)
James Maloney	2013–2015	736 (23 T, 320 G, 4 FG)
Ivan Cleary	1996–1999	722 (29 T, 303 G)
John Brass	1969–1976	715 (33 T, 295 G, 17 FG)
Latrell Mitchell	2016–2019	679 (65 T, 209 G, 1 FG)

=== Most points in a season ===
Name	Season	Points
Ivan Cleary	1998	284
Latrell Mitchell	2019	273
Michael Eden	1983	256
Todd Carney	2010	255
James Maloney	2013	252

=== Most points in a game ===
Name	Date	Points
Dave Brown	Round 6, 1935	45
Dave Brown	Round 15, 1935	38
Sam Walker	Round 22, 2026	36
Dave Brown	Round 18, 1935	32
Dave Brown	Round 16, 1935	26
Michael Eden	Round 21, 1983	26
Latrell Mitchell	Round 8, 2019	26
Sam Walker	Round 8, 2026	26

=== Most tries ===
Name	Seasons	Tries
Daniel Tupou	2012–2026	195
Anthony Minichiello	2000–2014	139
Shaun Kenny-Dowall	2007–2017	121
James Tedesco	2018–	110
Bill Mullins	1968–1978	104
Dave Brown	1930–1936, 1939–1941	93
Brad Fittler	1996–2004	91
Mark Harris	1970–1979	88
Ryan Cross	1998–2006	85
Fred Tottey	1930–1937	77

=== Most tries in a season ===
Name	Season	Tries
Dave Brown	1935	38
Rod O'Loan	1935	27
Fred Tottey	1936	25
Mark Nawaqanitawase	2025	25
Bill Mullins	1974	23

=== Most tries in a match ===
Name	Date	Tries
Rod O'Loan	Round 5, 1935	7
Dave Brown	Round 15, 1935	6
Dave Brown	Round 18, 1935	6
Gordon Wright	Round 10, 1920	5
Dave Brown	Round 6, 1935	5
Brian Allsop	Round 10, 1955	5
Matt Ikuvalu	Round 9, 2020	5

=== Most goals ===
Name	Seasons	Goals
Craig Fitzgibbon	2000–2009	655
Allan McKean	1967–1973	422
Sam Walker	2021-	331
James Maloney	2013–2015	320
Ivan Cleary	1996–1999	303

=== Most goals in a season ===
Name	Season	Goals
Ivan Cleary	1998	116
James Maloney	2013	108
James Maloney	2014	106
James Maloney	2015	106
Michael Eden	1983	103

=== Most goals in a match ===
Name	Date	Goals
Dave Brown	Round 6, 1935	15
Sam Walker	Round 23, 2022	12
Sam Walker	Round 22, 2026	12
Michael Eden	Round 21, 1983	11
Wally Messenger	Round 12, 1916	10
Dave Brown	Round 15, 1935	10
Allan McKean	Round 4, 1972	10
James Maloney	Round 23, 2013	10
Sam Walker	Round 8, 2024	10
Sam Walker	Round 23, 2025	10

=== Most field goals ===
Name	Seasons	Field goals
Kevin Ashley	1963–1969	25
John Brass	1969–1976	17
Kevin Hastings	1976–1987	17
Tony Melrose	1986-89	17
John Peard	1966, 1968–1971, 1974–1975	10

=== Rothmans Medal winners ===
Name	Season
Kevin Junee	1970
Kevin Hastings	1981
Michael Eden	1983
Brad Fittler	1997

=== Dally M Medal winners ===
Name	Season
Gary Freeman	1992
Todd Carney	2010
James Tedesco	2019, 2025

=== Most first grade games as coach ===
Name	Seasons	Games
Trent Robinson	2013–	336
Arthur Halloway	1930–1931, 1933–1938, 1945, 1947	168
Arthur Beetson	1977–1978, 1985–1988, 1994	158
Ricky Stuart	2002–2006	141
Phil Gould	1995–1999	134

=== Most wins as coach ===
Name	Seasons	Games
Trent Robinson	2013–	210
Arthur Halloway	1930–1931, 1933–1938, 1945, 1947	113
Jack Gibson	1967–1968, 1974–1976	89
Ricky Stuart	2002–2006	87
Phil Gould	1995–1999	80
Arthur Beetson	1977–1978, 1985–1988, 1994	76

== Team records ==
=== Biggest wins vs active teams ===
Margin	Score	Opposition	Venue	Date
80	87–7	Canterbury-Bankstown	Sydney Sports Ground	18 May 1935
70	82–12	North Queensland Cowboys	Queensalnd Country Bank Stadium	30 July 2026
66	72–6	Wests Tigers	Sydney Cricket Ground	20 August 2022
62	62–0	South Sydney Rabbitohs	Sydney Football Stadium	25 April 1996
59	59–0	Brisbane Broncos	Suncorp Stadium	4 June 2020
52	58–6	New Zealand Warriors	Sydney Football Stadium	30 May 2004
52	56–4	Parramatta Eels	Sydney Football Stadium	15 March 2014
52	58–6	Gold Coast Titans	Sydney Cricket Ground	4 August 2019
52	64–12	Dolphins	Suncorp Stadium	9 August 2025
46	46–0	Manly Warringah Sea Eagles	Sydney Football Stadium	14 March 1999
46	62–16	St. George Illawarra Dragons	Allianz Stadium	25 April 2026
44	48–4	Newcastle Knights	Sydney Football Stadium	18 June 2004
40	55–15	Canberra Raiders	Sydney Sports Ground	23 May 1982
40	40–0	Cronulla-Sutherland Sharks	Allianz Stadium	20 July 2013
36	42–6	Penrith Panthers	Centrebet Stadium	2 August 2013
35	41–6	Melbourne Storm	Sydney Football Stadium	11 June 2000

=== Biggest losses vs active teams ===
Margin	Score	Opposition	Venue	Date
62	4–66	Canberra Raiders	Bruce Stadium	15 April 1990
56	0–56	Manly Warringah Sea Eagles	Brookvale Oval	7 July 2007
52	8–60	South Sydney Rabbitohs	ANZ Stadium	25 September 2020
46	14–60	Canterbury-Bankstown Bulldogs	ANZ Stadium	28 March 2010
46	0–46; 0–46	Melbourne Storm	Allianz Stadium; McDonald Jones Stadium	11 June 2016; 1 July 2021
44	4–48	Penrith Panthers	BlueBet Stadium	12 May 2023
40	0–40	North Queensland Cowboys	1300SMILES Stadium	17 March 2016
38	6–44	St. George Illawarra Dragons	WIN Stadium	29 July 2005
38	10–48	Dolphins	Suncorp Stadium	12 June 2026
36	14–50	Brisbane Broncos	Allianz Stadium	6 March 2025
34	14–48	Cronulla-Sutherland Sharks	Caltex Field	28 July 1991
34	12–46; 6–40	Newcastle Knights	Marathon Stadium; Marathon Stadium	30 June 2000; 8 September 2001
33	0–33	Parramatta Eels	Sydney Cricket Ground	19 September 1982
26	16–42	New Zealand Warriors	Mt. Smart Stadium	27 August 2006
24	18–42	New Zealand Warriors	Mt. Smart Stadium	6 March 2026
20	16–36; 6–26	Gold Coast Titans	Allianz Stadium; Cbus Super Stadium	27 July 2012; 16 May 2016
16	24–40	Wests Tigers	Sydney Football Stadium	27 March 2009

=== Biggest wins vs defunct teams ===
Margin	Score	Opposition	Venue	Date
58	62–4	Western Suburbs Magpies	Sydney Football Stadium	19 July 1998
56	61–5	University	Sydney Sports Ground	11 May 1935
48	52–4; 57–9	North Sydney	Sydney Sports Ground; Sydney Cricket Ground	15 August 1931; 15 June 1935
45	47–2	Illawarra Steelers	Sydney Sports Ground	11 March 1983
42	44–2	St. George Dragons	Sydney Cricket Ground	20 March 1987
40	40–0	Newtown	Marrickville Oval	30 July 1932
40	53–13	Balmain	Sydney Cricket Ground	31 August 1935
38	50–12	Adelaide Rams	Sydney Football Stadium	17 April 1998
36	36–0	Glebe	Royal Agricultural Society Showground	10 September 1910
32	42–10	Annandale	Sydney Cricket Ground No. 2	17 June 1920
30	38–8	Gold Coast-Tweed Giants	Sydney Football Stadium	27 August 1989
27	45–18	Northern Eagles	Sydney Football Stadium	16 June 2002
26	38–12	South Queensland Crushers	Suncorp Stadium	25 May 1996
21	26–5	Cumberland	Royal Agricultural Society Showground	27 June 1908
19	25–6	Western Reds	WACA Ground	4 August 1995
17	34–17	Newcastle	Royal Agricultural Society Showground	25 July 1908

=== Biggest losses vs defunct teams ===
Margin	Score	Opposition	Venue	Date
51	8–59	Balmain	Leichhardt Oval	23 August 1952
46	0–46	St. George Dragons	Jubilee Oval	20 June 1993
41	10–51	North Sydney	North Sydney Oval	8 July 1944
36	9–45	Newtown	Henson Park	22 August 1954
34	0–34	Illawarra Steelers	Wollongong Showground	18 August 1991
31	2–33	Western Suburbs	Sydney Sports Ground	13 August 1966
22	18–40	Northern Eagles	Sydney Football Stadium	8 July 2001
20	7–27	Glebe	Sydney Cricket Ground	12 July 1924
19	16–35	University	Wentworth Park	6 July 1929
16	12–28	Gold Coast Seagulls	Seagulls Stadium	21 July 1990
14	14–28	South Queensland Crushers	Suncorp Stadium	23 May 1997
2	14–16	Annandale	Wentworth Park	15 August 1914
–	–	Adelaide Rams	–	–
–	–	Cumberland	–	–
–	–	Newcastle	–	–
–	–	Western Reds	–	–

=== Longest winning streak ===
Games	Start	End
19	Round 4, 1975	Round 22, 1975
16	Round 6, 1912	Round 7, 1913
13	Round 9, 1935	Round 2, 1936
12	Round 14, 2015	Qualifying finals, 2015
11	Round 11, 1911	Round 4, 1912
11	Round 5, 1923	Round 17, 1923
11	Round 11, 1940	Round 5, 1941
11	Round 22, 1995	Round 10, 1996
11	Round 22, 2002	Round 2, 2003

=== Longest losing streak ===
Games	Start	End
25	Round 14, 1965	Round 2, 1967
16	Round 10, 1964	Round 7, 1965
12	Round 7, 1954	Round 18, 1954
11	Round 4, 1949	Round 14, 1949
10	Round 8, 1963	Round 16, 1963

== Attendance records ==
=== Highest home attendances ===
Attendance	Opponent	Venue	Date
62,255	Parramatta Eels	Stadium Australia	Round 1, 2000
50,130	Manly-Warringah Sea Eagles	Sydney Cricket Ground	Round 6, 1974
48,476	North Sydney Bears	Sydney Cricket Ground	Round 5, 1921
41,906	South Sydney Rabbitohs	Sydney Football Stadium (2022)	Round 25, 2022
40,864	St. George Illawarra Dragons	Sydney Football Stadium	Round 8, 2017
40,752	St. George Illawarra Dragons	Sydney Football Stadium	Round 7, 2013

=== Highest finals attendances ===
Attendance	Opponent	Venue	Date
94,277	Brisbane Broncos	Stadium Australia	Grand Final, 2000
82,922	Canberra Raiders	Stadium Australia	Grand Final, 2019
82,688	Melbourne Storm	Stadium Australia	Grand Final, 2018
82,334	St. George Illawarra Dragons	Stadium Australia	Grand Final, 2010
82,127	Canterbury-Bankstown Bulldogs	Stadium Australia	Grand Final, 2004
81,491	Manly-Warringah Sea Eagles	Stadium Australia	Grand Final, 2013

=== Highest away attendances ===
Attendance	Opponent	Venue	Date
59,708	South Sydney Rabbitohs	Stadium Australia	Round 26, 2013
54,833	Wests Tigers	Stadium Australia	Round 1, 2001
43,469	South Sydney Rabbitohs	Sydney Cricket Ground	Round 21, 1967
41,211	Brisbane Broncos	QE II Stadium	Round 19, 1994
41,142	St. George Illawarra Dragons	Sydney Football Stadium	Round 8, 2018
40,164	St. George Illawarra Dragons	Sydney Football Stadium	Round 8, 2012
