= 1997 Canberra Raiders season =

Team information
- Coach: Mal Meninga
- Captain: Ricky Stuart
- Stadium: Bruce Stadium
← 1996	List of seasons	1998 →

The 1997 Canberra Raiders season was the 16th in the club's history. They competed in the Super League's Telstra Cup and World Club Championship. Coached by Mal Meninga and captained by Ricky Stuart, the Raiders finished third in the Telstra Cup regular season, and were eliminated in the Preliminary Final. The club did not make the finals of the World Club Championship, despite winning five of their six matches.

== Telstra Cup ==
Pos	Team	Pld	W	D	L	PF	PA	PD	Pts
1	Brisbane Broncos (P)	18	14	1	3	481	283	+198	29
2	Cronulla Sharks	18	12	0	6	403	230	+173	24
3	Canberra Raiders	18	11	0	7	436	337	+99	22
4	Canterbury Bulldogs	18	10	0	8	453	447	+6	20
5	Penrith Panthers	18	9	0	9	431	462	-31	18
6	Hunter Mariners	18	7	0	11	350	363	-13	14
7	Auckland Warriors	18	7	0	11	332	406	-74	14
8	Perth Reds	18	7	0	11	321	456	-135	14
9	Adelaide Rams	18	6	1	11	303	402	-99	13
10	North Queensland Cowboys	18	5	2	11	328	452	-124	12

- (P) - Premiers

=== Ladder progression ===
- Numbers highlighted in green indicate that the team finished the round inside the top 5.
- Numbers highlighted in blue indicates the team finished first on the ladder in that round.
- Numbers highlighted in red indicates the team finished in last place on the ladder in that round

	Team	1	2	3	4	5	6	7	8	9	10	11	12	13	14	15	16	17	18
1	Brisbane	2	4	6	8	10	12	14	14	16	18	19	19	19	21	23	25	27	29
2	Cronulla	2	4	6	6	6	8	8	8	10	10	12	14	16	16	18	20	22	24
3	Canberra	0	0	0	0	2	2	4	6	8	10	12	14	14	16	16	18	20	22
4	Canterbury	2	2	4	4	4	6	8	10	10	12	14	14	16	16	18	20	20	20
5	Penrith	2	4	6	8	8	10	10	12	12	12	12	14	16	16	16	16	18	18
6	Hunter	0	0	0	2	2	2	4	6	6	6	8	10	12	14	14	14	14	14
7	Auckland	0	2	2	2	4	6	6	6	6	6	6	6	6	8	10	10	12	14
8	Perth	0	2	2	4	6	6	8	8	8	10	10	12	12	12	12	14	14	14
9	Adelaide	0	0	2	4	4	4	4	6	8	9	9	9	11	11	11	11	11	13
10	North Queensland	2	2	2	2	4	4	4	4	6	7	8	8	8	10	12	12	12	12

=== Finals ===
Qualifying/Elimination Final
2	Cronulla	22
3	Canberra	18
4	Canterbury	14
5	Penrith	15

Major/Minor Semi Final
1	Brisbane	34
Cronulla	2
Canberra	32
Penrith	12

Preliminary Final
Cronulla	10
Canberra	4

Grand Final
Brisbane	26
Cronulla	8

== World Club Championship ==
Pool A

Club	Played	Won	Lost	Drawn	For	Against	Diff.	Points
Brisbane Broncos	6	6	0	0	270	52	218	12
Auckland Warriors	6	6	0	0	268	82	186	12
Cronulla Sharks	6	6	0	0	230	54	176	12
Penrith Panthers	6	6	0	0	256	120	136	12
Canberra Raiders	6	5	1	0	302	108	194	10
Canterbury Bulldogs	6	4	2	0	218	121	97	8
