= List of Canterbury-Bankstown Bulldogs records =

The Canterbury-Bankstown Bulldogs are a professional rugby league club in the National Rugby League (NRL), the premier rugby league football competition in Australasia.

Based in Belmore, a suburb of Sydney, in 1935 the Bulldogs were admitted to the New South Wales Rugby League (NSWRL) competition, a predecessor of the current NRL competition.

The Bulldogs won their first premiership in just their fourth season (1938). At the time it made them the quickest club (barring the founding clubs) to win a premiership after admission to the competition, a record which was only recently beaten in 1999 by the Melbourne Storm. They won a second premiership in 1942 but then had to wait another 38 years before breaking through for a third title in 1980. During the 80s, the Bulldogs were a dominant force in the competition appearing in five grand finals, 1980, 1984, 1985, 1986 and 1988, winning four of them, in 1980 (18-4 against Eastern Suburbs), 1984 (6-4 against Parramatta Eels), 1985 (7-6 against St. George Dragons) and 1988 (24-12 against Balmain Tigers), only to lose in 1986 (4-2 against Parramatta Eels). In the 90s they featured in the 1994, 1995 and 1998 grand finals, winning in 1995 (17-4 against Manly Sea Eagles), but losing in 1994 (36-12 against Canberra Raiders) and in 1998 (38-12 against Brisbane Broncos). Their most recent success was in 2004, when they beat the Sydney Roosters 16-13. The tryscorers were Hazem El Masri and Matt Utai, and the Clive Churchill Medal winner was Willie Mason.

== Club records ==
=== Biggest wins vs current NRL clubs ===
Margin	Score	Opposition	Venue	Date
62	66–4	North Queensland Cowboys	Belmore Sports Ground	27 August 1995
50	62–12	South Sydney Rabbitohs	Sydney Football Stadium	3 August 2003
48	52–4	Canberra Raiders	Telstra Stadium	12 August 2007
46	50–4	Melbourne Storm	Sydney Showground	10 August 2003
46	52–6	Newcastle Knights	Telstra Stadium	27 August 2004
46	60–14	Sydney Roosters	ANZ Stadium	28 March 2010
44	54–10	New Zealand Warriors	Ericsson Stadium	5 September 2004
38	42–4	Cronulla-Sutherland Sharks	ANZ Stadium	17 March 2014
38	42–4	Manly Warringah Sea Eagles	Allianz Stadium	27 July 2025
38	38–0	St. George Illawarra Dragons	UOW Jubilee Oval	26 August 2018
38	38–0	Wests Tigers	Moreton Daily Stadium	5 September 2021
36	42–6	Parramatta Eels	Belmore Sports Ground	12 April 1993
36	40–4	Brisbane Broncos	Suncorp Stadium	11 July 2003
32	56–24	Manly Warringah Sea Eagles	Brookvale Oval	17 August 2003
32	32–0	Gold Coast Titans	Belmore Sports Ground	23 March 2024
26	40–14; 40–14; 46–20	Penrith Panthers	Penrith Stadium; Sydney Showground; Telstra Stadium	13 April 1980; 8 July 2001; 30 July 2004

=== Biggest losses vs current NRL clubs ===
Margin	Score	Opposition	Venue	Date
80	7–87	Eastern Suburbs	Sydney Sports Ground	18 May 1935
66	0–66	Manly Warringah Sea Eagles	Bankwest Stadium	3 July 2021
66	0–66	Newcastle Knights	Accor Stadium	2 July 2023
52	4–56	Parramatta Eels	Parramatta Stadium	12 August 2005
52	2–54; 4–56	Wests Tigers	Telstra Stadium; ANZ Stadium	19 August 2005; 3 August 2008
46	0–46	Melbourne Storm	Olympic Park	31 May 2008
42	10–52	Cronulla-Sutherland Sharks	Sydney Football Stadium	16 September 2001
42	0–42	Penrith Panthers	ANZ Stadium	26 September 2020
40	18–58	Canberra Raiders	ANZ Stadium	21 June 2008
38	0–38	South Sydney Rabbitohs	Stadium Australia	2 April 2021
36	12–48; 0–36	North Queensland Cowboys	Carrara Stadium; 1300SMILES Stadium	27 May 2005; 21 July 2016
36	4–40	St. George Illawarra Dragons	Netstrata Jubilee Stadium	14 April 2019
34	6–40	New Zealand Warriors	Mt. Smart Stadium	16 March 2019
31	10–41	Brisbane Broncos	Suncorp Stadium	8 August 2014
28	6–34	Gold Coast Titans	Suncorp Stadium	2 August 2021

=== Biggest wins vs former clubs ===
Margin	Score	Opposition	Venue	Date
52	52–0	Western Suburbs Magpies	Lidcombe Oval	2 June 1985
46	56–10	Gold Coast Chargers	Belmore Sports Ground	19 April 1998
44	50–6	North Sydney Bears	North Sydney Oval	18 May 1975
42	42–0	Western Reds	Parramatta Stadium	9 April 1995
41	41–0	University	Belmore Sports Ground	1 August 1936
39	52–13	Balmain Tigers	Leichhardt Oval	20 April 1981
32	38–6	Newtown Jets	Belmore Sports Ground	12 August 1979
26	26–0	St. George Dragons	Belmore Sports Ground	5 August 1988
26	30–4	Adelaide Rams	Belmore Sports Ground	3 May 1998
25	25–0	Illawarra Steelers	Belmore Sports Ground	1 June 1986
20	38–18; 42–22	Northern Eagles	Sydney Showground; Sydney Showground	10 March 2001; 6 July 2002
12	48–36	Hunter Mariners	Belmore Sports Ground	12 May 1997
7	25–18	South Queensland Crushers	Suncorp Stadium	20 August 1995

=== Biggest losses vs former clubs ===
Margin	Score	Opposition	Venue	Date
85	6–91	St. George	Earl Park	11 May 1935
54	11–65	Western Suburbs	Pratten Park	31 August 1935
43	2–45	North Sydney	Belmore Sports Ground	17 April 1954
40	9–49	Newtown	Marrickville Oval	27 July 1935
40	4–44	Illawarra Steelers	Wollongong Showground	31 March 1991
39	5–44	Balmain	Leichhardt Oval	4 May 1935
28	6–34	Perth Reds	Perth Oval	23 March 1997
8	22–30	Northern Eagles	Brookvale Oval	2 July 2000
2	20–22	Adelaide Rams	Adelaide Oval	27 March 1998
–	–	Gold Coast Chargers	–	–
–	–	Hunter Mariners	–	–
–	–	South Queensland Crushers	–	–
–	–	University	–	–

=== Biggest comeback ===
Recovered from a 20-point deficit.

- Trailed Northern Eagles 20-0 after 23 minutes to win 32-30 at NorthPower Stadium on 24 June 2001.
- Trailed Canberra Raiders 20-0 after 44 minutes to win 32-20 at Canberra Stadium on 10 May 2025.

=== Worst collapse ===
Surrendered a 20-point lead.

- Led Parramatta Eels 20–0 after 45 minutes to lose 28-20 at ANZ Stadium on 15 March 2008.

== Scoring records ==
Most points in a match

- 66 points, Canterbury beat North Queensland 66–4 (27 August 1995)+

Most points in a match (Lose)

- 36 points, Wests Tigers beat Canterbury 37–36 (27 March 2005)

Highest score conceded

- 91 points, St George beat Canterbury 91–6 (11 May 1935)^

Most points in a season

- 342 (16 tries, 139 goals), Hazem El Masri in 2004

Most tries in a match

- 5, Edgar Newham against Balmain (15 August 1942), Canterbury won 26–20 - NRL
- 5, Nigel Vagana against Souths (19 April 2002), Canterbury won 32–6 - NRL

Most goals in a match

- 11, Hazem El Masri against Souths (3 August 2003), Canterbury won 62–12

^ denotes premiership record

+ denotes club record for biggest win and most points in a match

== Streak records ==
Longest winning streak

- 17 matches, 31 March – 3 August 2002

Longest losing streak

- 11 matches, 25 June 1955 – 14 April 1956
- 11 matches, 6 July 1965 – 17 April 1966

== Player records ==
Current to Round 15, 2025

=== Most first grade games ===
- 317, Hazem El Masri (1996–2009)
- 273, Steve Mortimer (1976–1988)
- 262, Terry Lamb (1984–1996)
- 245, Steve Folkes (1978–1989, 1991)
- 241, Josh Jackson (2012–2022)
- 232, Chris Anderson (1971–1984)
- 225, Luke Patten (2001–2010)
- 222, Steve Price (1994–2004)
- 222, Aiden Tolman (2011–2020)
- 218, Andrew Ryan (2003–2011)
- 217, Josh Morris (2009–2018)

=== Most tries for club ===
- 159, Hazem El Masri (1996–2009)
- 123, Terry Lamb (1984–1996)
- 103, Josh Morris (2009–2018)
- 94, Chris Anderson (1971–1984)
- 82, Luke Patten (2001–2010)
- 79, Steve Mortimer (1976–1988)
- 78, Peter Mortimer (1977–1987)
- 72, Ben Barba (2008–2013)
- 71, Matt Utai (2002–2009)
- 63, Steve Gearin (1976–1982, 1985)

=== Most goals for club ===
- 891, Hazem El Masri (1996–2009)
- 630, Daryl Halligan (1994–2000)
- 405, Steve Gearin (1976–1982, 1985)
- 375, Terry Lamb (1984–1996)
- 233, Les Johns (1963–1971)

=== Most field goals for club ===
- 37, Terry Lamb (1984–1996)
- 19, Les Johns (1963–1971)
- 11, Trent Hodkinson (2011–2015)
- 10, Ron Raper (1966–1972)
- 10, Braith Anasta (2000–2005)

=== Most points for club ===
- 2,418 (159 tries, 891 goals), Hazem El Masri (1996–2009)
- 1,490 (57 tries, 630 goals, 2 field goals), Daryl Halligan (1994–2000)
- 1,279 (123 tries, 375 goals, 37 field goals), Terry Lamb (1984–1996)
- 1,006 (63 tries, 405 goals), Steve Gearin (1976–1982, 1985)
- 545 (14 tries, 233 goals, 19 field goals), Les Johns (1963–1971)
- 484 (21 tries, 197 goals, 6 field goals), Matt Burton (2020–)
- 417 (12 tries, 179 goals, 11 field goals), Trent Hodkinson (2011–2015)

=== Rothmans Medal winners ===
- Greg Brentnall (1982)
- Terry Lamb (1984)
- Ewan McGrady (1991)

=== Dally M Medal winners ===
- Ben Barba (2012)

=== Player of the Year (Dr George Peponis Medal) ===
Year	Player
2013	James Graham
2014	James Graham
2014	Sam Perrett
2015	Brett Morris
2015	Aiden Tolman
2016	David Klemmer
2017	Josh Jackson
2018	David Klemmer
2019	Will Hopoate
2020	Kieran Foran
2021	Josh Jackson
2022	Jeremy Marshall-King
2023	Jacob Preston
2024	Viliame Kikau
2025	Stephen Crichton

== Footnotes ==
- Woods B (2007). El Magic - The Life of Hazem El Masri. Harper Collins Publishing. ISBN 0-7322-8402-3
- Andrews M (2006). The ABC of Rugby League. ABC Publishing. ISBN 0-7333-1946-7
- Whiticker A & Hudson G (2005). Canterbury Bulldogs - The Encyclopedia of Rugby League Players. Bas Publishing. ISBN 1-920910-50-6
- Whittaker A & Collis I (2004). The History of Rugby League Clubs. ISBN 978-1-74110-470-7
- Lane D (1996). A Family Betrayal - One Man's Super League War - Jarred McCracken. Ironbark Publishing. ISBN 0-330-35839-1
- Chesterton R (1996). Good as Gould - Phil Gould's Stormy Life in Football. Ironbark Publishing. ISBN 0-330-35873-1
- Lester G (1991). The Bulldog Story. Playright Publishing. ISBN 0-646-04447-8
- Whiticker A (1992). The Terry Lamb Story. Gary Allen Publishing. ISBN 1-875169-14-8
- Tasker N (1988). Top-Dog - The Steve Mortimer Story. Century Hutchinson Publishing. ISBN 0-09-169231-8
- Lester G (1985). Berries to Bulldogs. Lester - Townsend Publishing. ISBN 0-949853-06-2
- NRL Official Information Handbook (2001–2007). Season Guide.
- Middleton D (1987–2006). The Official NSWRL, ARL, NRL Yearbook / Annual.
- Christensen EE (1946–1977). NSWRL Yearbook.
- Rugby League Review (2003–2007)
- Big League (1974–2007)
- Rugby League Week (1970–2007)
- The Rugby League News
